= List of World Table Tennis Championships medalists =

== Results of individual events ==
The tables below are medalists of individual events (men's and women's singles, men's and women's doubles and mixed).

=== Men's singles ===
Year	Host City	Gold	Silver	Bronze
1926	London	(Kingdom of Hungary) Roland Jacobi	(Kingdom of Hungary) Zoltán Mechlovits	(Austria) Munio Pillinger
1926	London	(Kingdom of Hungary) Roland Jacobi	(Kingdom of Hungary) Zoltán Mechlovits	(India) S.R.G. Suppiah
1928	Stockholm	(Kingdom of Hungary) Zoltán Mechlovits	(Kingdom of Hungary) Laszlo Bellak	(Austria) Paul Flussmann
1928	Stockholm	(Kingdom of Hungary) Zoltán Mechlovits	(Kingdom of Hungary) Laszlo Bellak	(Austria) Alfred Liebster
1929	Budapest	(England) Fred Perry	(Kingdom of Hungary) Miklós Szabados	(England) Adrian Haydon
1929	Budapest	(England) Fred Perry	(Kingdom of Hungary) Miklós Szabados	(Kingdom of Hungary) Zoltán Mechlovits
1930	Berlin	(Kingdom of Hungary) Viktor Barna	(Kingdom of Hungary) Laszlo Bellak	(Kingdom of Hungary) Lajos Dávid
1930	Berlin	(Kingdom of Hungary) Viktor Barna	(Kingdom of Hungary) Laszlo Bellak	(Kingdom of Hungary) Stephen Kelen
1931	Budapest	(Kingdom of Hungary) Miklós Szabados	(Kingdom of Hungary) Viktor Barna	(Kingdom of Hungary) Ferenc Kovács
1931	Budapest	(Kingdom of Hungary) Miklós Szabados	(Kingdom of Hungary) Viktor Barna	(Weimar Republic) Nikita Madjaroglou
1932	Prague	(Kingdom of Hungary) Viktor Barna	(Kingdom of Hungary) Miklós Szabados	(Kingdom of Hungary) István Boros
1932	Prague	(Kingdom of Hungary) Viktor Barna	(Kingdom of Hungary) Miklós Szabados	(Austria) Erwin Kohn
1933	Baden bei Wien	(Kingdom of Hungary) Viktor Barna	(Czechoslovakia) Stanislav Kolář	(Kingdom of Hungary) Sándor Glancz
1933	Baden bei Wien	(Kingdom of Hungary) Viktor Barna	(Czechoslovakia) Stanislav Kolář	(England) Adrian Haydon
1934	Paris	(Kingdom of Hungary) Viktor Barna	(Kingdom of Hungary) Laszlo Bellak	(Kingdom of Hungary) Tibor Házi
1934	Paris	(Kingdom of Hungary) Viktor Barna	(Kingdom of Hungary) Laszlo Bellak	(Kingdom of Hungary) Miklós Szabados
1935	Wembley	(Kingdom of Hungary) Viktor Barna	(Kingdom of Hungary) Miklós Szabados	(Poland) Alojzy Ehrlich
1935	Wembley	(Kingdom of Hungary) Viktor Barna	(Kingdom of Hungary) Miklós Szabados	(Austria) Erwin Kohn
1936	Prague	(Czechoslovakia) Stanislav Kolář	(Poland) Alojzy Ehrlich	(Austria) Richard Bergmann
1936	Prague	(Czechoslovakia) Stanislav Kolář	(Poland) Alojzy Ehrlich	(Kingdom of Hungary) Ferenc Soos
1937	Baden bei Wien	(Austria) Richard Bergmann	(Poland) Alojzy Ehrlich	(Austria) Hans Hartinger
1937	Baden bei Wien	(Austria) Richard Bergmann	(Poland) Alojzy Ehrlich	(Kingdom of Hungary) Ferenc Soos
1938	Wembley	(Czechoslovakia) Bohumil Váňa	(Austria) Richard Bergmann	(Kingdom of Hungary) Viktor Barna
1938	Wembley	(Czechoslovakia) Bohumil Váňa	(Austria) Richard Bergmann	(Kingdom of Hungary) Tibor Házi
1939	Cairo	(England) Richard Bergmann	(Poland) Alojzy Ehrlich	(Socialist Federal Republic of Yugoslavia) Žarko Dolinar
1939	Cairo	(England) Richard Bergmann	(Poland) Alojzy Ehrlich	(Czechoslovakia) Bohumil Váňa
1947	Paris	(Czechoslovakia) Bohumil Váňa	(Hungary) Ferenc Sidó	(England) Johnny Leach
1947	Paris	(Czechoslovakia) Bohumil Váňa	(Hungary) Ferenc Sidó	(United States) Lou Pagliaro
1948	Wembley	(England) Richard Bergmann	(Czechoslovakia) Bohumil Váňa	(France) Guy Amouretti
1948	Wembley	(England) Richard Bergmann	(Czechoslovakia) Bohumil Váňa	(Czechoslovakia) Ivan Andreadis
1949	Stockholm	(England) Johnny Leach	(Czechoslovakia) Bohumil Váňa	(United States) Marty Reisman
1949	Stockholm	(England) Johnny Leach	(Czechoslovakia) Bohumil Váňa	(Hungary) Ferenc Soos
1950	Budapest	(England) Richard Bergmann	(Hungary) Ferenc Soos	(Czechoslovakia) Ivan Andreadis
1950	Budapest	(England) Richard Bergmann	(Hungary) Ferenc Soos	(Hungary) Ferenc Sidó
1951	Vienna	(England) Johnny Leach	(Czechoslovakia) Ivan Andreadis	(Hungary) Ferenc Sidó
1951	Vienna	(England) Johnny Leach	(Czechoslovakia) Ivan Andreadis	(Czechoslovakia) Václav Tereba
1952	Bombay	(Japan) Hiroji Sato	(Hungary) József Kóczián	(France) Guy Amouretti
1952	Bombay	(Japan) Hiroji Sato	(Hungary) József Kóczián	(France) René Roothooft
1953	Bucharest	(Hungary) Ferenc Sidó	(Czechoslovakia) Ivan Andreadis	(Hungary) József Kóczián
1953	Bucharest	(Hungary) Ferenc Sidó	(Czechoslovakia) Ivan Andreadis	(Czechoslovakia) Ladislav Štípek
1954	Wembley	(Japan) Ichiro Ogimura	(Sweden) Tage Flisberg	(Czechoslovakia) Ivan Andreadis
1954	Wembley	(Japan) Ichiro Ogimura	(Sweden) Tage Flisberg	(England) Richard Bergmann
1955	Utrecht	(Japan) Toshiaki Tanaka	(Socialist Federal Republic of Yugoslavia) Žarko Dolinar	(France) Stephen Cafiero
1955	Utrecht	(Japan) Toshiaki Tanaka	(Socialist Federal Republic of Yugoslavia) Žarko Dolinar	(Hungary) Ferenc Sidó
1956	Tokyo	(Japan) Ichiro Ogimura	(Japan) Toshiaki Tanaka	(Japan) Akio Nohira
1956	Tokyo	(Japan) Ichiro Ogimura	(Japan) Toshiaki Tanaka	(Japan) Yoshio Tomita
1957	Stockholm	(Japan) Toshiaki Tanaka	(Japan) Ichiro Ogimura	(Czechoslovakia) Ivan Andreadis
1957	Stockholm	(Japan) Toshiaki Tanaka	(Japan) Ichiro Ogimura	(East Germany) Heinz Schneider
1959	Dortmund	(China) Rong Guotuan	(Hungary) Ferenc Sidó	(United States) Dick Miles
1959	Dortmund	(China) Rong Guotuan	(Hungary) Ferenc Sidó	(Japan) Ichiro Ogimura
1961	Beijing	(China) Zhuang Zedong	(China) Li Furong	(China) Xu Yinsheng
1961	Beijing	(China) Zhuang Zedong	(China) Li Furong	(China) Zhang Xielin
1963	Prague	(China) Zhuang Zedong	(China) Li Furong	(China) Wang Zhiliang
1963	Prague	(China) Zhuang Zedong	(China) Li Furong	(China) Zhang Xielin
1965	Ljubljana	(China) Zhuang Zedong	(China) Li Furong	(West Germany) Eberhard Schöler
1965	Ljubljana	(China) Zhuang Zedong	(China) Li Furong	(China) Zhou Lansun
1967	Stockholm	(Japan) Nobuhiko Hasegawa	(Japan) Mitsuru Kohno	(Japan) Koji Kimura
1967	Stockholm	(Japan) Nobuhiko Hasegawa	(Japan) Mitsuru Kohno	(West Germany) Eberhard Schöler
1969	Munich	(Japan) Shigeo Itoh	(West Germany) Eberhard Schöler	(Japan) Kenji Kasai
1969	Munich	(Japan) Shigeo Itoh	(West Germany) Eberhard Schöler	(Japan) Tokio Tasaka
1971	Nagoya	(Sweden) Stellan Bengtsson	(Japan) Shigeo Itoh	(Socialist Federal Republic of Yugoslavia) Dragutin Šurbek
1971	Nagoya	(Sweden) Stellan Bengtsson	(Japan) Shigeo Itoh	(China) Xi Enting
1973	Sarajevo	(China) Xi Enting	(Sweden) Kjell Johansson	(Socialist Federal Republic of Yugoslavia) Antun Stipančić
1973	Sarajevo	(China) Xi Enting	(Sweden) Kjell Johansson	(Socialist Federal Republic of Yugoslavia) Dragutin Šurbek
1975	Calcutta	(Hungary) István Jónyer	(Socialist Federal Republic of Yugoslavia) Antun Stipančić	(Japan) Mitsuru Kono
1975	Calcutta	(Hungary) István Jónyer	(Socialist Federal Republic of Yugoslavia) Antun Stipančić	(Japan) Norio Takashima
1977	Birmingham	(Japan) Mitsuru Kohno	(China) Guo Yuehua	(China) Huang Liang
1977	Birmingham	(Japan) Mitsuru Kohno	(China) Guo Yuehua	(China) Liang Geliang
1979	Pyongyang	(Japan) Seiji Ono	(China) Guo Yuehua	(China) Li Zhenshi
1979	Pyongyang	(Japan) Seiji Ono	(China) Guo Yuehua	(China) Liang Geliang
1981	Novi Sad	(China) Guo Yuehua	(China) Cai Zhenhua	(Sweden) Stellan Bengtsson
1981	Novi Sad	(China) Guo Yuehua	(China) Cai Zhenhua	(Socialist Federal Republic of Yugoslavia) Dragutin Šurbek
1983	Tokyo	(China) Guo Yuehua	(China) Cai Zhenhua	(China) Jiang Jialiang
1983	Tokyo	(China) Guo Yuehua	(China) Cai Zhenhua	(China) Wang Huiyuan
1985	Gothenburg	(China) Jiang Jialiang	(China) Chen Longcan	(Hong Kong) Lo Chuen Tsung
1985	Gothenburg	(China) Jiang Jialiang	(China) Chen Longcan	(China) Teng Yi
1987	New Delhi	(China) Jiang Jialiang	(Sweden) Jan-Ove Waldner	(China) Chen Xinhua
1987	New Delhi	(China) Jiang Jialiang	(Sweden) Jan-Ove Waldner	(China) Teng Yi
1989	Dortmund	(Sweden) Jan-Ove Waldner	(Sweden) Jörgen Persson	(Poland) Andrzej Grubba
1989	Dortmund	(Sweden) Jan-Ove Waldner	(Sweden) Jörgen Persson	(China) Yu Shentong
1991	Chiba City	(Sweden) Jörgen Persson	(Sweden) Jan-Ove Waldner	(Korea) Kim Taek-soo
1991	Chiba City	(Sweden) Jörgen Persson	(Sweden) Jan-Ove Waldner	(China) Ma Wenge
1993	Gothenburg	(France) Jean-Philippe Gatien	(Belgium) Jean-Michel Saive	(Croatia) Zoran Primorac
1993	Gothenburg	(France) Jean-Philippe Gatien	(Belgium) Jean-Michel Saive	(Sweden) Jan-Ove Waldner
1995	Tianjin	(China) Kong Linghui	(China) Liu Guoliang	(China) Ding Song
1995	Tianjin	(China) Kong Linghui	(China) Liu Guoliang	(China) Wang Tao
1997	Manchester	(Sweden) Jan-Ove Waldner	(Belarus) Vladimir Samsonov	(China) Kong Linghui
1997	Manchester	(Sweden) Jan-Ove Waldner	(Belarus) Vladimir Samsonov	(China) Yan Sen
1999	Eindhoven	(China) Liu Guoliang	(China) Ma Lin	(Austria) Werner Schlager
1999	Eindhoven	(China) Liu Guoliang	(China) Ma Lin	(Sweden) Jan-Ove Waldner
2001	Osaka	(China) Wang Liqin	(China) Kong Linghui	(Chinese Taipei) Chiang Peng-lung
2001	Osaka	(China) Wang Liqin	(China) Kong Linghui	(China) Ma Lin
2003	Paris	(Austria) Werner Schlager	(South Korea) Joo Se-hyuk	(China) Kong Linghui
2003	Paris	(Austria) Werner Schlager	(South Korea) Joo Se-hyuk	(Greece) Kalinikos Kreanga
2005	Shanghai	(China) Wang Liqin	(China) Ma Lin	(Denmark) Michael Maze
2005	Shanghai	(China) Wang Liqin	(China) Ma Lin	(South Korea) Oh Sang-eun
2007	Zagreb	(China) Wang Liqin	(China) Ma Lin	(South Korea) Ryu Seung-min
2007	Zagreb	(China) Wang Liqin	(China) Ma Lin	(China) Wang Hao
2009	Yokohama	(China) Wang Hao	(China) Wang Liqin	(China) Ma Lin
2009	Yokohama	(China) Wang Hao	(China) Wang Liqin	(China) Ma Long
2011	Rotterdam	(China) Zhang Jike	(China) Wang Hao	(Germany) Timo Boll
2011	Rotterdam	(China) Zhang Jike	(China) Wang Hao	(China) Ma Long
2013	Paris	(China) Zhang Jike	(China) Wang Hao	(China) Ma Long
2013	Paris	(China) Zhang Jike	(China) Wang Hao	(China) Xu Xin
2015	Suzhou	(China) Ma Long	(China) Fang Bo	(China) Fan Zhendong
2015	Suzhou	(China) Ma Long	(China) Fang Bo	(China) Zhang Jike
2017	Düsseldorf	(China) Ma Long	(China) Fan Zhendong	(South Korea) Lee Sang-su
2017	Düsseldorf	(China) Ma Long	(China) Fan Zhendong	(China) Xu Xin
2019	Budapest	(China) Ma Long	(Sweden) Mattias Falck	(South Korea) An Jae-hyun
2019	Budapest	(China) Ma Long	(Sweden) Mattias Falck	(China) Liang Jingkun
2021	Houston	(China) Fan Zhendong	(Sweden) Truls Möregårdh	(Germany) Timo Boll
2021	Houston	(China) Fan Zhendong	(Sweden) Truls Möregårdh	(China) Liang Jingkun
2023	Durban	(China) Fan Zhendong	(China) Wang Chuqin	(China) Liang Jingkun
2023	Durban	(China) Fan Zhendong	(China) Wang Chuqin	(China) Ma Long
2025	Doha	(China) Wang Chuqin	(Brazil) Hugo Calderano	(China) Liang Jingkun
2025	Doha	(China) Wang Chuqin	(Brazil) Hugo Calderano	(Sweden) Truls Möregårdh

==== Medal table ====
Rank	Nation	Gold	Silver	Bronze	Total
1	China	23	19	37	79
2	Hungary	10	12	17	39
3	Japan	9	4	8	21
4	England	6	0	4	10
5	Sweden	4	7	4	15
6	Czechoslovakia	3	5	7	15
7	Austria	2	1	8	11
8	France	1	0	4	5
9	Poland	0	3	2	5
10	Yugoslavia	0	2	5	7
11	South Korea	0	1	4	5
12	West Germany	0	1	2	3
13	Belarus	0	1	0	1
13	Belgium	0	1	0	1
13	Brazil	0	1	0	1
16	Germany	0	0	3	3
16	United States	0	0	3	3
18	Chinese Taipei	0	0	1	1
18	Croatia	0	0	1	1
18	Denmark	0	0	1	1
18	East Germany	0	0	1	1
18	Greece	0	0	1	1
18	Hong Kong	0	0	1	1
18	India	0	0	1	1
18	Korea	0	0	1	1
Totals (25 entries)		58	58	116	232

=== Women's singles ===
Year	Host City	Gold	Silver	Bronze
1926	London	(Kingdom of Hungary) Mária Mednyánszky	(Wales) Doris Gubbins	(Austria) Anastasia Flussmann
1926	London	(Kingdom of Hungary) Mária Mednyánszky	(Wales) Doris Gubbins	(England) Winifred Land
1928	Stockholm	(Kingdom of Hungary) Mária Mednyánszky	(Weimar Republic) Erika Metzger	(Wales) Doris Gubbins
1928	Stockholm	(Kingdom of Hungary) Mária Mednyánszky	(Weimar Republic) Erika Metzger	(England) Joan Ingram
1929	Budapest	(Kingdom of Hungary) Mária Mednyánszky	(Austria) Gertrude Wildam	(Kingdom of Hungary) Magda Gál
1929	Budapest	(Kingdom of Hungary) Mária Mednyánszky	(Austria) Gertrude Wildam	(Kingdom of Hungary) Anna Sipos
1930	Berlin	(Kingdom of Hungary) Mária Mednyánszky	(Kingdom of Hungary) Anna Sipos	(Austria) Josefine Kolbe
1930	Berlin	(Kingdom of Hungary) Mária Mednyánszky	(Kingdom of Hungary) Anna Sipos	(Austria) Gertrude Wildam
1931	Budapest	(Kingdom of Hungary) Mária Mednyánszky	(Weimar Republic) Mona Muller-Rüster	(Kingdom of Hungary) Magda Gál
1931	Budapest	(Kingdom of Hungary) Mária Mednyánszky	(Weimar Republic) Mona Muller-Rüster	(Kingdom of Hungary) Anna Sipos
1932	Prague	(Kingdom of Hungary) Anna Sipos	(Kingdom of Hungary) Mária Mednyánszky	(Kingdom of Hungary) Magda Gál
1932	Prague	(Kingdom of Hungary) Anna Sipos	(Kingdom of Hungary) Mária Mednyánszky	(Czechoslovakia) Marie Šmídová
1933	Baden bei Wien	(Kingdom of Hungary) Anna Sipos	(Kingdom of Hungary) Mária Mednyánszky	(Kingdom of Hungary) Magda Gál
1933	Baden bei Wien	(Kingdom of Hungary) Anna Sipos	(Kingdom of Hungary) Mária Mednyánszky	(Weimar Republic) Astrid Krebsbach
1934	Paris	(Czechoslovakia) Marie Kettnerová	(Nazi Germany) Astrid Krebsbach	(England) Dora Emdin
1934	Paris	(Czechoslovakia) Marie Kettnerová	(Nazi Germany) Astrid Krebsbach	(Kingdom of Hungary) Magda Gál
1935	Wembley	(Czechoslovakia) Marie Kettnerová	(Kingdom of Hungary) Magda Gál	(France) Marcelle Delacour
1935	Wembley	(Czechoslovakia) Marie Kettnerová	(Kingdom of Hungary) Magda Gál	(Czechoslovakia) Marie Šmídová
1936	Prague	(United States) Ruth Aarons	(Nazi Germany) Astrid Krebsbach	(Czechoslovakia) Marie Kettnerová
1936	Prague	(United States) Ruth Aarons	(Nazi Germany) Astrid Krebsbach	(Czechoslovakia) Marie Šmídová
1937	Baden bei Wien	(United States) Ruth Aarons (Austria) Gertrude Pritzi	Not awarded, as there was a tie for gold.	(Nazi Germany) Hilde Bussmann
1937	Baden bei Wien	(United States) Ruth Aarons (Austria) Gertrude Pritzi	Not awarded, as there was a tie for gold.	(Czechoslovakia) Marie Kettnerová
1938	Wembley	(Austria) Gertrude Pritzi	(Czechoslovakia) Vlasta Depetrisová	(United States) Betty Henry
1938	Wembley	(Austria) Gertrude Pritzi	(Czechoslovakia) Vlasta Depetrisová	(Czechoslovakia) Věra Votrubcová
1939	Cairo	(Czechoslovakia) Vlasta Depetrisová	(Nazi Germany) Gertrude Pritzi	(Czechoslovakia) Marie Kettnerová
1939	Cairo	(Czechoslovakia) Vlasta Depetrisová	(Nazi Germany) Gertrude Pritzi	(Egypt) Samiha Naili
1947	Paris	(Hungary) Gizella Farkas	(England) Elizabeth Blackbourn	(England) Vera Dace
1947	Paris	(Hungary) Gizella Farkas	(England) Elizabeth Blackbourn	(Austria) Gertrude Pritzi
1948	Wembley	(Hungary) Gizella Farkas	(England) Vera Thomas	(Czechoslovakia) Vlasta Depetrisová-Pokorna
1948	Wembley	(Hungary) Gizella Farkas	(England) Vera Thomas	(Romania) Angelica Rozeanu
1949	Stockholm	(Hungary) Gizella Farkas	(Czechoslovakia) Kveta Hrusakova	(Austria) Gertrude Pritzi
1949	Stockholm	(Hungary) Gizella Farkas	(Czechoslovakia) Kveta Hrusakova	(United States) Thelma Thall
1950	Budapest	(Romania) Angelica Rozeanu	(Hungary) Gizella Farkas	(Hungary) Rozsi Karpati
1950	Budapest	(Romania) Angelica Rozeanu	(Hungary) Gizella Farkas	(Romania) Sari Szasz
1951	Vienna	(Romania) Angelica Rozeanu	(Hungary) Gizella Farkas	(Austria) Gertrude Pritzi
1951	Vienna	(Romania) Angelica Rozeanu	(Hungary) Gizella Farkas	(United States) Leah Thall
1952	Bombay	(Romania) Angelica Rozeanu	(Hungary) Gizella Farkas	(England) Rosalind Rowe
1952	Bombay	(Romania) Angelica Rozeanu	(Hungary) Gizella Farkas	(Austria) Ermelinde Wertl
1953	Bucharest	(Romania) Angelica Rozeanu	(Hungary) Gizella Farkas	(England) Diane Rowe
1953	Bucharest	(Romania) Angelica Rozeanu	(Hungary) Gizella Farkas	(England) Rosalind Rowe
1954	Wembley	(Romania) Angelica Rozeanu	(Japan) Yoshiko Tanaka	(Japan) Fujie Eguchi
1954	Wembley	(Romania) Angelica Rozeanu	(Japan) Yoshiko Tanaka	(Hungary) Éva Kóczián
1955	Utrecht	(Romania) Angelica Rozeanu	(Austria) Ermelinde Wertl	(Hungary) Éva Kóczián
1955	Utrecht	(Romania) Angelica Rozeanu	(Austria) Ermelinde Wertl	(Japan) Kiiko Watanabe
1956	Tokyo	(Japan) Tomi Okawa	(Japan) Kiiko Watanabe	(Japan) Fujie Eguchi
1956	Tokyo	(Japan) Tomi Okawa	(Japan) Kiiko Watanabe	(Romania) Ella Zeller
1957	Stockholm	(Japan) Fujie Eguchi	(England) Ann Haydon	(Japan) Kiiko Watanabe
1957	Stockholm	(Japan) Fujie Eguchi	(England) Ann Haydon	(Romania) Ella Zeller
1959	Dortmund	(Japan) Kimiyo Matsuzaki	(Japan) Fujie Eguchi	(Hungary) Éva Kóczián
1959	Dortmund	(Japan) Kimiyo Matsuzaki	(Japan) Fujie Eguchi	(China) Qiu Zhonghui
1961	Beijing	(China) Qiu Zhonghui	(Hungary) Éva Kóczián	(Japan) Kimiyo Matsuzaki
1961	Beijing	(China) Qiu Zhonghui	(Hungary) Éva Kóczián	(China) Wang Jian
1963	Prague	(Japan) Kimiyo Matsuzaki	(Romania) Maria Alexandru	(Romania) Ella Constantinescu
1963	Prague	(Japan) Kimiyo Matsuzaki	(Romania) Maria Alexandru	(China) Sun Meiying
1965	Ljubljana	(Japan) Naoko Fukatsu	(China) Lin Huiqing	(China) Li Li
1965	Ljubljana	(Japan) Naoko Fukatsu	(China) Lin Huiqing	(Japan) Noriko Yamanaka
1967	Stockholm	(Japan) Sachiko Morisawa	(Japan) Naoko Fukatsu	(Soviet Union) Zoja Rudnova
1967	Stockholm	(Japan) Sachiko Morisawa	(Japan) Naoko Fukatsu	(Japan) Noriko Yamanaka
1969	Munich	(Japan) Toshiko Kowada	(East Germany) Gabriele Geißler	(Romania) Maria Alexandru
1969	Munich	(Japan) Toshiko Kowada	(East Germany) Gabriele Geißler	(Japan) Miho Hamada
1971	Nagoya	(China) Lin Huiqing	(China) Zheng Minzhi	(China) Li Li
1971	Nagoya	(China) Lin Huiqing	(China) Zheng Minzhi	(Czechoslovakia) Ilona Voštová
1973	Sarajevo	(China) Hu Yulan	(Czechoslovakia) Alica Grofová	(South Korea) Park Mi-ra
1973	Sarajevo	(China) Hu Yulan	(Czechoslovakia) Alica Grofová	(China) Zhang Li
1975	Calcutta	(North Korea) Pak Yung-sun	(China) Zhang Li	(Soviet Union) Tatiana Ferdman
1975	Calcutta	(North Korea) Pak Yung-sun	(China) Zhang Li	(China) Ge Xinai
1977	Birmingham	(North Korea) Pak Yung-sun	(China) Zhang Li	(China) Ge Xinai
1977	Birmingham	(North Korea) Pak Yung-sun	(China) Zhang Li	(China) Zhang Deying
1979	Pyongyang	(China) Ge Xinai	(North Korea) Li Song-suk	(China) Tong Ling
1979	Pyongyang	(China) Ge Xinai	(North Korea) Li Song-suk	(China) Zhang Deying
1981	Novi Sad	(China) Tong Ling	(China) Cao Yanhua	(South Korea) Lee Soo-ja
1981	Novi Sad	(China) Tong Ling	(China) Cao Yanhua	(China) Zhang Deying
1983	Tokyo	(China) Cao Yanhua	(South Korea) Yang Young-ja	(China) Huang Junqun
1983	Tokyo	(China) Cao Yanhua	(South Korea) Yang Young-ja	(China) Qi Baoxiang
1985	Gothenburg	(China) Cao Yanhua	(China) Geng Lijuan	(China) Dai Lili
1985	Gothenburg	(China) Cao Yanhua	(China) Geng Lijuan	(China) Qi Baoxiang
1987	New Delhi	(China) He Zhili	(South Korea) Yang Young-ja	(China) Dai Lili
1987	New Delhi	(China) He Zhili	(South Korea) Yang Young-ja	(China) Guan Jianhua
1989	Dortmund	(China) Qiao Hong	(North Korea) Li Bun-hui	(China) Chen Jing
1989	Dortmund	(China) Qiao Hong	(North Korea) Li Bun-hui	(South Korea) Hyun Jung-hwa
1991	Chiba City	(China) Deng Yaping	(Korea) Li Bun-hui	(Hong Kong) Chan Tan Lui
1991	Chiba City	(China) Deng Yaping	(Korea) Li Bun-hui	(China) Qiao Hong
1993	Gothenburg	(South Korea) Hyun Jung-hwa	(Chinese Taipei) Chen Jing	(Romania) Otilia Badescu
1993	Gothenburg	(South Korea) Hyun Jung-hwa	(Chinese Taipei) Chen Jing	(China) Gao Jun
1995	Tianjin	(China) Deng Yaping	(China) Qiao Hong	(China) Liu Wei
1995	Tianjin	(China) Deng Yaping	(China) Qiao Hong	(China) Qiao Yunping
1997	Manchester	(China) Deng Yaping	(China) Wang Nan	(China) Li Ju
1997	Manchester	(China) Deng Yaping	(China) Wang Nan	(China) Wu Na
1999	Eindhoven	(China) Wang Nan	(China) Zhang Yining	(China) Li Nan
1999	Eindhoven	(China) Wang Nan	(China) Zhang Yining	(South Korea) Ryu Ji-hye
2001	Osaka	(China) Wang Nan	(China) Lin Ling	(North Korea) Kim Yun-mi
2001	Osaka	(China) Wang Nan	(China) Lin Ling	(China) Zhang Yining
2003	Paris	(China) Wang Nan	(China) Zhang Yining	(Croatia) Tamara Boroš
2003	Paris	(China) Wang Nan	(China) Zhang Yining	(China) Li Ju
2005	Shanghai	(China) Zhang Yining	(China) Guo Yan	(China) Guo Yue
2005	Shanghai	(China) Zhang Yining	(China) Guo Yan	(Hong Kong) Lin Ling
2007	Zagreb	(China) Guo Yue	(China) Li Xiaoxia	(China) Guo Yan
2007	Zagreb	(China) Guo Yue	(China) Li Xiaoxia	(China) Zhang Yining
2009	Yokohama	(China) Zhang Yining	(China) Guo Yue	(China) Li Xiaoxia
2009	Yokohama	(China) Zhang Yining	(China) Guo Yue	(China) Liu Shiwen
2011	Rotterdam	(China) Ding Ning	(China) Li Xiaoxia	(China) Guo Yue
2011	Rotterdam	(China) Ding Ning	(China) Li Xiaoxia	(China) Liu Shiwen
2013	Paris	(China) Li Xiaoxia	(China) Liu Shiwen	(China) Ding Ning
2013	Paris	(China) Li Xiaoxia	(China) Liu Shiwen	(China) Zhu Yuling
2015	Suzhou	(China) Ding Ning	(China) Liu Shiwen	(China) Li Xiaoxia
2015	Suzhou	(China) Ding Ning	(China) Liu Shiwen	(China) Mu Zi
2017	Düsseldorf	(China) Ding Ning	(China) Zhu Yuling	(Japan) Miu Hirano
2017	Düsseldorf	(China) Ding Ning	(China) Zhu Yuling	(China) Liu Shiwen
2019	Budapest	(China) Liu Shiwen	(China) Chen Meng	(China) Ding Ning
2019	Budapest	(China) Liu Shiwen	(China) Chen Meng	(China) Wang Manyu
2021	Houston	(China) Wang Manyu	(China) Sun Yingsha	(China) Chen Meng
2021	Houston	(China) Wang Manyu	(China) Sun Yingsha	(China) Wang Yidi
2023	Durban	(China) Sun Yingsha	(China) Chen Meng	(China) Chen Xingtong
2023	Durban	(China) Sun Yingsha	(China) Chen Meng	(Japan) Hina Hayata
2025	Doha	(China) Sun Yingsha	(China) Wang Manyu	(China) Chen Xingtong
2025	Doha	(China) Sun Yingsha	(China) Wang Manyu	(Japan) Mima Ito

The champion of women's singles in 1937 was declared vacant due to time limit rule in force at the time. In 2001, it was decided to declare the two finalists co-champions.

==== Medal table ====
Rank	Nation	Gold	Silver	Bronze	Total
1	China	26	22	46	94
2	Hungary	10	9	11	30
3	Japan	7	4	11	22
4	Romania	6	1	7	14
5	Czechoslovakia	3	3	9	15
6	Austria	2	2	7	11
7	North Korea	2	2	1	5
8	United States	2	0	3	5
9	South Korea	1	2	4	7
10	Germany	0	5	2	7
11	England	0	3	7	10
12	Wales	0	1	1	2
13	Chinese Taipei	0	1	0	1
13	East Germany	0	1	0	1
13	Korea	0	1	0	1
16	Hong Kong	0	0	2	2
16	Soviet Union	0	0	2	2
18	Croatia	0	0	1	1
18	Egypt	0	0	1	1
18	France	0	0	1	1
Totals (20 entries)		59	57	116	232

=== Men's doubles ===
Year	Host City	Gold	Silver	Bronze
1926	London	(Kingdom of Hungary) Roland Jacobi (Kingdom of Hungary) Daniel Pecsi	(Kingdom of Hungary) Béla von Kehrling (Kingdom of Hungary) Zoltán Mechlovits	(Austria) Paul Flussmann (Austria) Munio Pillinger
1926	London	(Kingdom of Hungary) Roland Jacobi (Kingdom of Hungary) Daniel Pecsi	(Kingdom of Hungary) Béla von Kehrling (Kingdom of Hungary) Zoltán Mechlovits	(Wales) Cyril Mossford (Wales) Hedley Penny
1928	Stockholm	(Austria) Alfred Liebster (Austria) Robert Thum	(England) Charlie Bull (England) Fred Perry	(Kingdom of Hungary) Laszlo Bellak (Kingdom of Hungary) Sándor Glancz
1928	Stockholm	(Austria) Alfred Liebster (Austria) Robert Thum	(England) Charlie Bull (England) Fred Perry	(Kingdom of Hungary) Roland Jacobi (Kingdom of Hungary) Zoltán Mechlovits
1929	Budapest	(Kingdom of Hungary) Viktor Barna (Kingdom of Hungary) Miklós Szabados	(Kingdom of Hungary) Laszlo Bellak (Kingdom of Hungary) Sándor Glancz	(England) Charlie Bull (England) Fred Perry
1929	Budapest	(Kingdom of Hungary) Viktor Barna (Kingdom of Hungary) Miklós Szabados	(Kingdom of Hungary) Laszlo Bellak (Kingdom of Hungary) Sándor Glancz	(Kingdom of Hungary) István Reti (Kingdom of Hungary) György Szegedi
1930	Berlin	(Kingdom of Hungary) Viktor Barna (Kingdom of Hungary) Miklós Szabados	(Austria) Alfred Liebster (Austria) Robert Thum	(Kingdom of Hungary) Laszlo Bellak (Kingdom of Hungary) Sándor Glancz
1930	Berlin	(Kingdom of Hungary) Viktor Barna (Kingdom of Hungary) Miklós Szabados	(Austria) Alfred Liebster (Austria) Robert Thum	(Sweden) Valter Kolmodin (Sweden) Hille Nilsson
1931	Budapest	(Kingdom of Hungary) Viktor Barna (Kingdom of Hungary) Miklós Szabados	(Kingdom of Hungary) Lajos Dávid (Kingdom of Hungary) Stephen Kelen	(Austria) Manfred Feher (Austria) Alfred Liebster
1931	Budapest	(Kingdom of Hungary) Viktor Barna (Kingdom of Hungary) Miklós Szabados	(Kingdom of Hungary) Lajos Dávid (Kingdom of Hungary) Stephen Kelen	(Czechoslovakia) Jindřich Lauterbach (Czechoslovakia) Karel Svoboda
1932	Prague	(Kingdom of Hungary) Viktor Barna (Kingdom of Hungary) Miklós Szabados	(Kingdom of Hungary) Laszlo Bellak (Kingdom of Hungary) Sándor Glancz	(Kingdom of Hungary) István Boros (Kingdom of Hungary) Tibor Házi
1932	Prague	(Kingdom of Hungary) Viktor Barna (Kingdom of Hungary) Miklós Szabados	(Kingdom of Hungary) Laszlo Bellak (Kingdom of Hungary) Sándor Glancz	(England) Charlie Bull (England) David Jones
1933	Baden bei Wien	(Kingdom of Hungary) Viktor Barna (Kingdom of Hungary) Sándor Glancz	(Kingdom of Hungary) Lajos Dávid (Kingdom of Hungary) Stephen Kelen	(Austria) Manfred Feher (Austria) Alfred Liebster
1933	Baden bei Wien	(Kingdom of Hungary) Viktor Barna (Kingdom of Hungary) Sándor Glancz	(Kingdom of Hungary) Lajos Dávid (Kingdom of Hungary) Stephen Kelen	(Austria) Paul Flussmann (Austria) Erwin Kohn
1934	Paris	(Kingdom of Hungary) Viktor Barna (Kingdom of Hungary) Miklós Szabados	(Kingdom of Hungary) Sándor Glancz (Kingdom of Hungary) Tibor Házi	(Kingdom of Hungary) István Boros (Kingdom of Hungary) Béla Nyitrai
1934	Paris	(Kingdom of Hungary) Viktor Barna (Kingdom of Hungary) Miklós Szabados	(Kingdom of Hungary) Sándor Glancz (Kingdom of Hungary) Tibor Házi	(Czechoslovakia) Miloslav Hamr (Czechoslovakia) Erwin Koln-Korda
1935	Wembley	(Kingdom of Hungary) Viktor Barna (Kingdom of Hungary) Miklós Szabados	(England) Adrian Haydon (Austria) Alfred Liebster	(France) Raoul Bedoc (France) Daniel Guérin
1935	Wembley	(Kingdom of Hungary) Viktor Barna (Kingdom of Hungary) Miklós Szabados	(England) Adrian Haydon (Austria) Alfred Liebster	(Kingdom of Hungary) Laszlo Bellak (Kingdom of Hungary) Stephen Kelen
1936	Prague	(United States) Robert Blattner (United States) James McClure	(Czechoslovakia) Stanislav Kolář (Czechoslovakia) Okter Petrisek	(Czechoslovakia) Karel Fleischner (Czechoslovakia) Adolf Šlár
1936	Prague	(United States) Robert Blattner (United States) James McClure	(Czechoslovakia) Stanislav Kolář (Czechoslovakia) Okter Petrisek	(Kingdom of Hungary) Tibor Házi (Kingdom of Hungary) Ferenc Soos
1937	Baden bei Wien	(United States) Robert Blattner (United States) James McClure	(Austria) Richard Bergmann (Austria) Helmut Goebel	(Czechoslovakia) Miloslav Hamr (Czechoslovakia) František Hanec Pivec
1937	Baden bei Wien	(United States) Robert Blattner (United States) James McClure	(Austria) Richard Bergmann (Austria) Helmut Goebel	(Czechoslovakia) Adolf Šlár (Czechoslovakia) Václav Tereba
1938	Wembley	(United States) James McClure (United States) Sol Schiff	(Kingdom of Hungary) Viktor Barna (Kingdom of Hungary) Laszlo Bellak	(England) Eric Filby (England) Hyman Lurie
1938	Wembley	(United States) James McClure (United States) Sol Schiff	(Kingdom of Hungary) Viktor Barna (Kingdom of Hungary) Laszlo Bellak	(Czechoslovakia) Stanislav Kolář (Czechoslovakia) Václav Tereba
1939	Cairo	(England) Viktor Barna (England) Richard Bergmann	(Czechoslovakia) Miloslav Hamr (Luxembourg) Josef Tartakower	(France) Raoul Bedoc (France) Michel Haguenauer
1939	Cairo	(England) Viktor Barna (England) Richard Bergmann	(Czechoslovakia) Miloslav Hamr (Luxembourg) Josef Tartakower	(England) Ken Hyde (England) Hyman Lurie
1947	Paris	(Czechoslovakia) Adolf Šlár (Czechoslovakia) Bohumil Váňa	(England) Jack Carrington (England) Johnny Leach	(England) Viktor Barna (England) Adrian Haydon
1947	Paris	(Czechoslovakia) Adolf Šlár (Czechoslovakia) Bohumil Váňa	(England) Jack Carrington (England) Johnny Leach	(Czechoslovakia) Ladislav Štípek (Czechoslovakia) Václav Tereba
1948	Wembley	(Czechoslovakia) Ladislav Štípek (Czechoslovakia) Bohumil Váňa	(England) Adrian Haydon (Hungary) Ferenc Soos	(England) Viktor Barna (England) Richard Bergmann
1948	Wembley	(Czechoslovakia) Ladislav Štípek (Czechoslovakia) Bohumil Váňa	(England) Adrian Haydon (Hungary) Ferenc Soos	(Austria) Heinrich Bednar (Austria) Herbert Wunsch
1949	Stockholm	(Czechoslovakia) Ivan Andreadis (Czechoslovakia) František Tokár	(Czechoslovakia) Ladislav Štípek (Czechoslovakia) Bohumil Váňa	(England) Richard Bergmann (Sweden) Tage Flisberg
1949	Stockholm	(Czechoslovakia) Ivan Andreadis (Czechoslovakia) František Tokár	(Czechoslovakia) Ladislav Štípek (Czechoslovakia) Bohumil Váňa	(United States) Douglas Cartland (United States) Dick Miles
1950	Budapest	(Hungary) Ferenc Sidó (Hungary) Ferenc Soos	(Czechoslovakia) Ivan Andreadis (Czechoslovakia) František Tokár	(Czechoslovakia) Ladislav Štípek (Czechoslovakia) Bohumil Váňa
1950	Budapest	(Hungary) Ferenc Sidó (Hungary) Ferenc Soos	(Czechoslovakia) Ivan Andreadis (Czechoslovakia) František Tokár	(Czechoslovakia) Václav Tereba (Czechoslovakia) Josef Turnovský
1951	Vienna	(Czechoslovakia) Ivan Andreadis (Czechoslovakia) Bohumil Váňa	(Hungary) József Kóczián (Hungary) Ferenc Sidó	(England) Jack Carrington (England) Johnny Leach
1951	Vienna	(Czechoslovakia) Ivan Andreadis (Czechoslovakia) Bohumil Váňa	(Hungary) József Kóczián (Hungary) Ferenc Sidó	(Czechoslovakia) Ladislav Štípek (Czechoslovakia) František Tokár
1952	Bombay	(Japan) Norikazu Fujii (Japan) Tadaki Hayashi	(England) Richard Bergmann (England) Johnny Leach	(England) Viktor Barna (England) Adrian Haydon
1952	Bombay	(Japan) Norikazu Fujii (Japan) Tadaki Hayashi	(England) Richard Bergmann (England) Johnny Leach	(United States) Douglas Cartland (United States) Marty Reisman
1953	Bucharest	(Hungary) József Kóczián (Hungary) Ferenc Sidó	(England) Richard Bergmann (England) Johnny Leach	(Czechoslovakia) Ivan Andreadis (Czechoslovakia) Bohumil Váňa
1953	Bucharest	(Hungary) József Kóczián (Hungary) Ferenc Sidó	(England) Richard Bergmann (England) Johnny Leach	(England) Viktor Barna (England) Adrian Haydon
1954	Wembley	(Socialist Federal Republic of Yugoslavia) Žarko Dolinar (Socialist Federal Republic of Yugoslavia) Vilim Harangozo	(England) Viktor Barna (France) Michel Haguenauer	(Japan) Ichiro Ogimura (Japan) Yoshio Tomita
1954	Wembley	(Socialist Federal Republic of Yugoslavia) Žarko Dolinar (Socialist Federal Republic of Yugoslavia) Vilim Harangozo	(England) Viktor Barna (France) Michel Haguenauer	(Czechoslovakia) Adolf Šlár (Czechoslovakia) Václav Tereba
1955	Utrecht	(Czechoslovakia) Ivan Andreadis (Czechoslovakia) Ladislav Štípek	(Socialist Federal Republic of Yugoslavia) Žarko Dolinar (Socialist Federal Republic of Yugoslavia) Vilim Harangozo	(Hungary) József Kóczián (Hungary) Ferenc Sidó
1955	Utrecht	(Czechoslovakia) Ivan Andreadis (Czechoslovakia) Ladislav Štípek	(Socialist Federal Republic of Yugoslavia) Žarko Dolinar (Socialist Federal Republic of Yugoslavia) Vilim Harangozo	(Japan) Ichiro Ogimura (Japan) Yoshio Tomita
1956	Tokyo	(Japan) Ichiro Ogimura (Japan) Yoshio Tomita	(Czechoslovakia) Ivan Andreadis (Czechoslovakia) Ladislav Štípek	(Japan) Toshiaki Tanaka (Japan) Keisuke Tsunoda
1956	Tokyo	(Japan) Ichiro Ogimura (Japan) Yoshio Tomita	(Czechoslovakia) Ivan Andreadis (Czechoslovakia) Ladislav Štípek	(Czechoslovakia) Václav Tereba (Czechoslovakia) Ludvík Vyhnanovský
1957	Stockholm	(Czechoslovakia) Ivan Andreadis (Czechoslovakia) Ladislav Štípek	(Japan) Ichiro Ogimura (Japan) Toshiaki Tanaka	(Hungary) Elemér Gyetvai (Hungary) Ferenc Sidó
1957	Stockholm	(Czechoslovakia) Ivan Andreadis (Czechoslovakia) Ladislav Štípek	(Japan) Ichiro Ogimura (Japan) Toshiaki Tanaka	(Japan) Toshihiko Miyata (Japan) Keisuke Tsunoda
1959	Dortmund	(Japan) Teruo Murakami (Japan) Ichiro Ogimura	(Czechoslovakia) Ladislav Štípek (Czechoslovakia) Ludvík Vyhnanovský	(Sweden) Hans Alsér (Sweden) Åke Rakell
1959	Dortmund	(Japan) Teruo Murakami (Japan) Ichiro Ogimura	(Czechoslovakia) Ladislav Štípek (Czechoslovakia) Ludvík Vyhnanovský	(Hungary) Zoltán Berczik (Hungary) László Földy
1961	Beijing	(Japan) Nobuya Hoshino (Japan) Koji Kimura	(Hungary) Zoltán Berczik (Hungary) Ferenc Sidó	(China) Li Furong (China) Zhuang Zedong
1961	Beijing	(Japan) Nobuya Hoshino (Japan) Koji Kimura	(Hungary) Zoltán Berczik (Hungary) Ferenc Sidó	(China) Wang Jiasheng (China) Zhou Lansun
1963	Prague	(China) Wang Zhiliang (China) Zhang Xielin	(China) Xu Yinsheng (China) Zhuang Zedong	(Japan) Ken Konaka (Japan) Keiichi Miki
1963	Prague	(China) Wang Zhiliang (China) Zhang Xielin	(China) Xu Yinsheng (China) Zhuang Zedong	(China) Li Furong (China) Wang Jiasheng
1965	Ljubljana	(China) Xu Yinsheng (China) Zhuang Zedong	(China) Wang Zhiliang (China) Zhang Xielin	(China) Li Furong (China) Wang Jiasheng
1965	Ljubljana	(China) Xu Yinsheng (China) Zhuang Zedong	(China) Wang Zhiliang (China) Zhang Xielin	(China) Yu Changchun (China) Zhou Lansun
1967	Stockholm	(Sweden) Hans Alsér (Sweden) Kjell Johansson	(Soviet Union) Anatoly Amelin (Soviet Union) Stanislav Gomozkov	(Japan) Nobuhiko Hasegawa (Japan) Mitsuru Kono
1967	Stockholm	(Sweden) Hans Alsér (Sweden) Kjell Johansson	(Soviet Union) Anatoly Amelin (Soviet Union) Stanislav Gomozkov	(Czechoslovakia) Vladimír Miko (Czechoslovakia) Jaroslav Staněk
1969	Munich	(Sweden) Hans Alsér (Sweden) Kjell Johansson	(Japan) Nobuhiko Hasegawa (Japan) Tokio Tasaka	(Soviet Union) Anatoly Amelin (Soviet Union) Stanislav Gomozkov
1969	Munich	(Sweden) Hans Alsér (Sweden) Kjell Johansson	(Japan) Nobuhiko Hasegawa (Japan) Tokio Tasaka	(Japan) Shigeo Itoh (Japan) Mitsuru Kono
1971	Nagoya	(Hungary) István Jónyer (Hungary) Tibor Klampár	(China) Liang Geliang (China) Zhuang Zedong	(Japan) Katsuyuki Abe (Japan) Yujiro Imano
1971	Nagoya	(Hungary) István Jónyer (Hungary) Tibor Klampár	(China) Liang Geliang (China) Zhuang Zedong	(Japan) Nobuhiko Hasegawa (Japan) Tokio Tasaka
1973	Sarajevo	(Sweden) Stellan Bengtsson (Sweden) Kjell Johansson	(Hungary) István Jónyer (Hungary) Tibor Klampár	(France) Jean-Denis Constant (France) Jacques Secrétin
1973	Sarajevo	(Sweden) Stellan Bengtsson (Sweden) Kjell Johansson	(Hungary) István Jónyer (Hungary) Tibor Klampár	(Socialist Federal Republic of Yugoslavia) Antun Stipančić (Socialist Federal Republic of Yugoslavia) Dragutin Šurbek
1975	Calcutta	(Hungary) Gábor Gergely (Hungary) István Jónyer	(Socialist Federal Republic of Yugoslavia) Antun Stipančić (Socialist Federal Republic of Yugoslavia) Dragutin Šurbek	(Japan) Katsuyuki Abe (Japan) Shigeo Itoh
1975	Calcutta	(Hungary) Gábor Gergely (Hungary) István Jónyer	(Socialist Federal Republic of Yugoslavia) Antun Stipančić (Socialist Federal Republic of Yugoslavia) Dragutin Šurbek	(France) Jean-Denis Constant (France) Jacques Secrétin
1977	Birmingham	(China) Li Zhenshi (China) Liang Geliang	(China) Huang Liang (China) Lu Yuansheng	(Sweden) Stellan Bengtsson (Sweden) Kjell Johansson
1977	Birmingham	(China) Li Zhenshi (China) Liang Geliang	(China) Huang Liang (China) Lu Yuansheng	(Socialist Federal Republic of Yugoslavia) Antun Stipančić (Socialist Federal Republic of Yugoslavia) Dragutin Šurbek
1979	Pyongyang	(Socialist Federal Republic of Yugoslavia) Antun Stipančić (Socialist Federal Republic of Yugoslavia) Dragutin Šurbek	(Hungary) István Jónyer (Hungary) Tibor Klampár	(China) Guo Yuehua (China) Liang Geliang
1979	Pyongyang	(Socialist Federal Republic of Yugoslavia) Antun Stipančić (Socialist Federal Republic of Yugoslavia) Dragutin Šurbek	(Hungary) István Jónyer (Hungary) Tibor Klampár	(China) Li Zhenshi (China) Wang Huiyuan
1981	Novi Sad	(China) Cai Zhenhua (China) Li Zhenshi	(China) Guo Yuehua (China) Xie Saike	(France) Patrick Birocheau (France) Jacques Secrétin
1981	Novi Sad	(China) Cai Zhenhua (China) Li Zhenshi	(China) Guo Yuehua (China) Xie Saike	(Socialist Federal Republic of Yugoslavia) Antun Stipančić (Socialist Federal Republic of Yugoslavia) Dragutin Šurbek
1983	Tokyo	(Socialist Federal Republic of Yugoslavia) Zoran Kalinić (Socialist Federal Republic of Yugoslavia) Dragutin Šurbek	(China) Jiang Jialiang (China) Xie Saike	(Japan) Hiroyuki Abe (Japan) Seiji Ono
1983	Tokyo	(Socialist Federal Republic of Yugoslavia) Zoran Kalinić (Socialist Federal Republic of Yugoslavia) Dragutin Šurbek	(China) Jiang Jialiang (China) Xie Saike	(China) Wang Huiyuan (China) Yang Yuhua
1985	Gothenburg	(Sweden) Mikael Appelgren (Sweden) Ulf Carlsson	(Czechoslovakia) Milan Orlowski (Czechoslovakia) Jindřich Panský	(China) Cai Zhenhua (China) Jiang Jialiang
1985	Gothenburg	(Sweden) Mikael Appelgren (Sweden) Ulf Carlsson	(Czechoslovakia) Milan Orlowski (Czechoslovakia) Jindřich Panský	(China) Fan Changmao (China) He Zhiwen
1987	New Delhi	(China) Chen Longcan (China) Wei Qingguang	(Socialist Federal Republic of Yugoslavia) Ilija Lupulesku (Socialist Federal Republic of Yugoslavia) Zoran Primorac	(South Korea) Ahn Jae-hyung (South Korea) Yoo Nam-kyu
1987	New Delhi	(China) Chen Longcan (China) Wei Qingguang	(Socialist Federal Republic of Yugoslavia) Ilija Lupulesku (Socialist Federal Republic of Yugoslavia) Zoran Primorac	(Poland) Andrzej Grubba (Poland) Leszek Kucharski
1989	Dortmund	(West Germany) Steffen Fetzner (West Germany) Jörg Roßkopf	(Socialist Federal Republic of Yugoslavia) Zoran Kalinić (Poland) Leszek Kucharski	(China) Chen Longcan (China) Wei Qingguang
1989	Dortmund	(West Germany) Steffen Fetzner (West Germany) Jörg Roßkopf	(Socialist Federal Republic of Yugoslavia) Zoran Kalinić (Poland) Leszek Kucharski	(China) Hui Jun (China) Teng Yi
1991	Chiba City	(Sweden) Peter Karlsson (Sweden) Thomas von Scheele	(China) Lü Lin (China) Wang Tao	(Sweden) Erik Lindh (Sweden) Jörgen Persson
1991	Chiba City	(Sweden) Peter Karlsson (Sweden) Thomas von Scheele	(China) Lü Lin (China) Wang Tao	(Soviet Union) Andrei Mazunov (Soviet Union) Dmitry Mazunov
1993	Gothenburg	(China) Lü Lin (China) Wang Tao	(China) Ma Wenge (China) Zhang Lei	(South Korea) Kim Taek-soo (South Korea) Yoo Nam-kyu
1993	Gothenburg	(China) Lü Lin (China) Wang Tao	(China) Ma Wenge (China) Zhang Lei	(China) Lin Zhigang (China) Liu Guoliang
1995	Tianjin	(China) Lü Lin (China) Wang Tao	(Croatia) Zoran Primorac (Belarus) Vladimir Samsonov	(France) Damien Eloi (France) Jean-Philippe Gatien
1995	Tianjin	(China) Lü Lin (China) Wang Tao	(Croatia) Zoran Primorac (Belarus) Vladimir Samsonov	(China) Lin Zhigang (China) Liu Guoliang
1997	Manchester	(China) Kong Linghui (China) Liu Guoliang	(Sweden) Jörgen Persson (Sweden) Jan-Ove Waldner	(France) Damien Eloi (France) Jean-Philippe Gatien
1997	Manchester	(China) Kong Linghui (China) Liu Guoliang	(Sweden) Jörgen Persson (Sweden) Jan-Ove Waldner	(Japan) Kōji Matsushita (Japan) Hiroshi Shibutani
1999	Eindhoven	(China) Kong Linghui (China) Liu Guoliang	(China) Wang Liqin (China) Yan Sen	(South Korea) Kim Taek-soo (South Korea) Park Sang-joon
1999	Eindhoven	(China) Kong Linghui (China) Liu Guoliang	(China) Wang Liqin (China) Yan Sen	(Croatia) Zoran Primorac (Belarus) Vladimir Samsonov
2001	Osaka	(China) Wang Liqin (China) Yan Sen	(China) Kong Linghui (China) Liu Guoliang	(Chinese Taipei) Chang Yen-shu (Chinese Taipei) Chiang Peng-lung
2001	Osaka	(China) Wang Liqin (China) Yan Sen	(China) Kong Linghui (China) Liu Guoliang	(South Korea) Kim Taek-soo (South Korea) Oh Sang-eun
2003	Paris	(China) Wang Liqin (China) Yan Sen	(China) Kong Linghui (China) Wang Hao	(South Korea) Kim Taek-soo (South Korea) Oh Sang-eun
2003	Paris	(China) Wang Liqin (China) Yan Sen	(China) Kong Linghui (China) Wang Hao	(China) Ma Lin (China) Qin Zhijian
2005	Shanghai	(China) Kong Linghui (China) Wang Hao	(Germany) Timo Boll (Germany) Christian Süß	(China) Chen Qi (China) Ma Lin
2005	Shanghai	(China) Kong Linghui (China) Wang Hao	(Germany) Timo Boll (Germany) Christian Süß	(China) Wang Liqin (China) Yan Sen
2007	Zagreb	(China) Chen Qi (China) Ma Lin	(China) Wang Hao (China) Wang Liqin	(Chinese Taipei) Chang Yen-shu (Chinese Taipei) Chiang Peng-lung
2007	Zagreb	(China) Chen Qi (China) Ma Lin	(China) Wang Hao (China) Wang Liqin	(Hong Kong) Ko Lai Chak (Hong Kong) Li Ching
2009	Yokohama	(China) Chen Qi (China) Wang Hao	(China) Ma Long (China) Xu Xin	(China) Hao Shuai (China) Zhang Jike
2009	Yokohama	(China) Chen Qi (China) Wang Hao	(China) Ma Long (China) Xu Xin	(Japan) Seiya Kishikawa (Japan) Jun Mizutani
2011	Rotterdam	(China) Ma Long (China) Xu Xin	(China) Chen Qi (China) Ma Lin	(South Korea) Jung Young-sik (South Korea) Kim Min-seok
2011	Rotterdam	(China) Ma Long (China) Xu Xin	(China) Chen Qi (China) Ma Lin	(China) Wang Hao (China) Zhang Jike
2013	Paris	(Chinese Taipei) Chen Chien-an (Chinese Taipei) Chuang Chih-yuan	(China) Hao Shuai (China) Ma Lin	(Japan) Seiya Kishikawa (Japan) Jun Mizutani
2013	Paris	(Chinese Taipei) Chen Chien-an (Chinese Taipei) Chuang Chih-yuan	(China) Hao Shuai (China) Ma Lin	(China) Wang Liqin (China) Zhou Yu
2015	Suzhou	(China) Xu Xin (China) Zhang Jike	(China) Fan Zhendong (China) Zhou Yu	(South Korea) Lee Sang-su (South Korea) Seo Hyun-deok
2015	Suzhou	(China) Xu Xin (China) Zhang Jike	(China) Fan Zhendong (China) Zhou Yu	(Japan) Kenta Matsudaira (Japan) Koki Niwa
2017	Düsseldorf	(China) Fan Zhendong (China) Xu Xin	(Japan) Masataka Morizono (Japan) Yuya Oshima	(South Korea) Jung Young-sik (South Korea) Lee Sang-su
2017	Düsseldorf	(China) Fan Zhendong (China) Xu Xin	(Japan) Masataka Morizono (Japan) Yuya Oshima	(Japan) Koki Niwa (Japan) Maharu Yoshimura
2019	Budapest	(China) Ma Long (China) Wang Chuqin	(Romania) Ovidiu Ionescu (Spain) Álvaro Robles	(Portugal) Tiago Apolónia (Portugal) João Monteiro
2019	Budapest	(China) Ma Long (China) Wang Chuqin	(Romania) Ovidiu Ionescu (Spain) Álvaro Robles	(China) Liang Jingkun (China) Lin Gaoyuan
2021	Houston	(Sweden) Mattias Falck (Sweden) Kristian Karlsson	(South Korea) Jang Woo-jin (South Korea) Lim Jong-hoon	(China) Liang Jingkun (China) Lin Gaoyuan
2021	Houston	(Sweden) Mattias Falck (Sweden) Kristian Karlsson	(South Korea) Jang Woo-jin (South Korea) Lim Jong-hoon	(Japan) Shunsuke Togami (Japan) Yukiya Uda
2023	Durban	(China) Fan Zhendong (China) Wang Chuqin	(South Korea) Jang Woo-jin (South Korea) Lim Jong-hoon	(South Korea) Cho Dae-seong (South Korea) Lee Sang-su
2023	Durban	(China) Fan Zhendong (China) Wang Chuqin	(South Korea) Jang Woo-jin (South Korea) Lim Jong-hoon	(Germany) Patrick Franziska (Germany) Dimitrij Ovtcharov
2025	Doha	(Japan) Hiroto Shinozuka (Japan) Shunsuke Togami	(Chinese Taipei) Kao Cheng-jui (Chinese Taipei) Lin Yun-ju	(France) Florian Bourrassaud (France) Esteban Dorr
2025	Doha	(Japan) Hiroto Shinozuka (Japan) Shunsuke Togami	(Chinese Taipei) Kao Cheng-jui (Chinese Taipei) Lin Yun-ju	(France) Alexis Lebrun (France) Félix Lebrun

==== Medal table ====
Rank	Nation	Gold	Silver	Bronze	Total
1	China	19	16	22	57
2	Hungary	12	11.5	11	34.5
3	Czechoslovakia	6	6.5	14	26.5
4	Sweden	6	1	4.5	11.5
5	Japan	5	3	17	25
6	Yugoslavia	3	3.5	3	9.5
7	United States	3	0	2	5
8	England	1	5.5	9.5	16
9	Austria	1	2.5	5	8.5
10	Chinese Taipei	1	1	2	4
11	West Germany	1	0	0	1
12	South Korea	0	2	9	11
13	Soviet Union	0	1	2	3
14	Germany	0	1	1	2
15	France	0	0.5	9	9.5
16	Poland	0	0.5	1	1.5
17	Belarus	0	0.5	0.5	1
17	Croatia	0	0.5	0.5	1
19	Luxembourg	0	0.5	0	0.5
19	Romania	0	0.5	0	0.5
19	Spain	0	0.5	0	0.5
22	Hong Kong	0	0	1	1
22	Portugal	0	0	1	1
22	Wales	0	0	1	1
Totals (24 entries)		58	58	116	232

=== Women's doubles ===
Year	Host city	Gold	Silver	Bronze
1928	Stockholm	(Austria) Fanchette Flamm (Kingdom of Hungary) Mária Mednyánszky	(Wales) Doris Gubbins (England) Brenda Sommerville	(England) Joan Ingram (England) Winifred Land
1929	Budapest	(Weimar Republic) Erika Metzger (Weimar Republic) Mona Rüster	(Austria) Fanchette Flamm (Austria) Gertrude Wildam	(Kingdom of Hungary) Magda Gál (Kingdom of Hungary) IIona Zádor
1929	Budapest	(Weimar Republic) Erika Metzger (Weimar Republic) Mona Rüster	(Austria) Fanchette Flamm (Austria) Gertrude Wildam	(Kingdom of Hungary) Mária Mednyánszky (Kingdom of Hungary) Anna Sipos
1930	Berlin	(Kingdom of Hungary) Mária Mednyánszky (Kingdom of Hungary) Anna Sipos	(Kingdom of Hungary) Magda Gál (Kingdom of Hungary) Márta Komáromi	(Austria) Josefine Kolbe (Austria) Etta Neumann
1930	Berlin	(Kingdom of Hungary) Mária Mednyánszky (Kingdom of Hungary) Anna Sipos	(Kingdom of Hungary) Magda Gál (Kingdom of Hungary) Márta Komáromi	(Austria) Helly Reitzer (Austria) Gertrude Wildam
1931	Budapest	(Kingdom of Hungary) Mária Mednyánszky (Kingdom of Hungary) Anna Sipos	(Kingdom of Hungary) Magda Gál (Kingdom of Hungary) Lili Tiszai	(Austria) Lili Forbath (Austria) Helly Reitzer
1931	Budapest	(Kingdom of Hungary) Mária Mednyánszky (Kingdom of Hungary) Anna Sipos	(Kingdom of Hungary) Magda Gál (Kingdom of Hungary) Lili Tiszai	(Weimar Republic) Mona Muller-Rüster (Czechoslovakia) Marie Šmídová
1932	Prague	(Kingdom of Hungary) Mária Mednyánszky (Kingdom of Hungary) Anna Sipos	(Czechoslovakia) Anna Braunová (Czechoslovakia) Marie Šmídová	(Weimar Republic) Anita Felguth (Kingdom of Hungary) Magda Gál
1932	Prague	(Kingdom of Hungary) Mária Mednyánszky (Kingdom of Hungary) Anna Sipos	(Czechoslovakia) Anna Braunová (Czechoslovakia) Marie Šmídová	(Czechoslovakia) Věra Pavlásková (Czechoslovakia) Berta Zdobnická
1933	Baden bei Wien	(Kingdom of Hungary) Mária Mednyánszky (Kingdom of Hungary) Anna Sipos	(Kingdom of Hungary) Magda Gál (Kingdom of Hungary) Emilné Rácz	(Weimar Republic) Anita Felguth (Weimar Republic) Annemarie Schulz
1933	Baden bei Wien	(Kingdom of Hungary) Mária Mednyánszky (Kingdom of Hungary) Anna Sipos	(Kingdom of Hungary) Magda Gál (Kingdom of Hungary) Emilné Rácz	(Czechoslovakia) Jozka Veselska (Czechoslovakia) Marie Walterová
1934	Paris	(Kingdom of Hungary) Mária Mednyánszky (Kingdom of Hungary) Anna Sipos	(Nazi Germany) Anita Felguth (Nazi Germany) Astrid Krebsbach	(Nazi Germany) Hilde Bussmann (Kingdom of Hungary) Magda Gál
1934	Paris	(Kingdom of Hungary) Mária Mednyánszky (Kingdom of Hungary) Anna Sipos	(Nazi Germany) Anita Felguth (Nazi Germany) Astrid Krebsbach	(Czechoslovakia) Marie Kettnerová (Czechoslovakia) Marie Šmídová
1935	Wembley	(Kingdom of Hungary) Mária Mednyánszky (Kingdom of Hungary) Anna Sipos	(Czechoslovakia) Marie Kettnerová (Czechoslovakia) Marie Šmídová	(England) L. Booker (Nazi Germany) Hilde Bussmann
1935	Wembley	(Kingdom of Hungary) Mária Mednyánszky (Kingdom of Hungary) Anna Sipos	(Czechoslovakia) Marie Kettnerová (Czechoslovakia) Marie Šmídová	(Nazi Germany) Anita Felguth (Nazi Germany) Astrid Krebsbach
1936	Prague	(Czechoslovakia) Marie Kettnerová (Czechoslovakia) Marie Šmídová	(Czechoslovakia) Vlasta Depetrisová (Czechoslovakia) Věra Votrubcová	(United States) Ruth Aarons (United States) Jessie Purves
1936	Prague	(Czechoslovakia) Marie Kettnerová (Czechoslovakia) Marie Šmídová	(Czechoslovakia) Vlasta Depetrisová (Czechoslovakia) Věra Votrubcová	(Kingdom of Hungary) Magda Gál (Kingdom of Hungary) Mária Mednyánszky
1937	Baden bei Wien	(Czechoslovakia) Vlasta Depetrisová (Czechoslovakia) Věra Votrubcová	(England) Margaret Osborne (England) Wendy Woodhead	(England) Lillian Hutchings (Austria) Stefanie Werle
1937	Baden bei Wien	(Czechoslovakia) Vlasta Depetrisová (Czechoslovakia) Věra Votrubcová	(England) Margaret Osborne (England) Wendy Woodhead	(Czechoslovakia) Marie Kettnerová (Nazi Germany) Annemarie Schulz
1938	Wembley	(Czechoslovakia) Vlasta Depetrisová (Czechoslovakia) Věra Votrubcová	(Kingdom of Hungary) Dora Beregi (Kingdom of Hungary) Ida Ferenczy	(England) Dora Emdin (England) Margaret Osborne
1938	Wembley	(Czechoslovakia) Vlasta Depetrisová (Czechoslovakia) Věra Votrubcová	(Kingdom of Hungary) Dora Beregi (Kingdom of Hungary) Ida Ferenczy	(England) Phyllis Hodgkinson (England) Doris Jordan
1939	Cairo	(Nazi Germany) Hilde Bussmann (Nazi Germany) Gertrude Pritzi	(Romania) Angelica Adelstein (Romania) Sari Kolozsvári	(Czechoslovakia) Vlasta Depetrisová (Czechoslovakia) Věra Votrubcová
1939	Cairo	(Nazi Germany) Hilde Bussmann (Nazi Germany) Gertrude Pritzi	(Romania) Angelica Adelstein (Romania) Sari Kolozsvári	(Czechoslovakia) Marie Kettnerová (Egypt) Samiha Naili
1947	Paris	(Hungary) Gizella Farkas (Austria) Gertrude Pritzi	(United States) Mae Clouther (United States) Reba Monness	(Belgium) Mary Detournay (Belgium) Josee Wouters
1947	Paris	(Hungary) Gizella Farkas (Austria) Gertrude Pritzi	(United States) Mae Clouther (United States) Reba Monness	(United States) Davida Hawthorn (United States) Leah Thall
1948	Wembley	(England) Margaret Franks (England) Vera Thomas	(England) Dora Beregi (Scotland) Helen Elliot	(England) Audrey Fowler (England) Irene Lentle
1948	Wembley	(England) Margaret Franks (England) Vera Thomas	(England) Dora Beregi (Scotland) Helen Elliot	(United States) Leah Thall (United States) Thelma Thall
1949	Stockholm	(Scotland) Helen Elliott (Hungary) Gizella Farkas	(England) Pinkie Barnes (England) Joan Crosby	(Czechoslovakia) Eliška Fürstová (Czechoslovakia) Ida Koťátková
1949	Stockholm	(Scotland) Helen Elliott (Hungary) Gizella Farkas	(England) Pinkie Barnes (England) Joan Crosby	(Hungary) Rozsi Karpati (Hungary) Erzsébet Mezei
1950	Budapest	(England) Dora Beregi (Scotland) Helen Elliot	(Hungary) Gizella Farkas (Romania) Angelica Rozeanu	(England) Vera Dace (England) Margaret Franks
1950	Budapest	(England) Dora Beregi (Scotland) Helen Elliot	(Hungary) Gizella Farkas (Romania) Angelica Rozeanu	(Czechoslovakia) Eliška Fürstová (Czechoslovakia) Květa Hrušková
1951	Vienna	(England) Diane Rowe (England) Rosalind Rowe	(Romania) Angelica Rozeanu (Romania) Sári Szász	(Hungary) Gizella Farkas (Hungary) Rozsi Karpati
1951	Vienna	(England) Diane Rowe (England) Rosalind Rowe	(Romania) Angelica Rozeanu (Romania) Sári Szász	(United States) Peggy Ichkoff (United States) Leah Thall
1952	Bombay	(Japan) Shizuki Narahara (Japan) Tomie Nishimura	(England) Diane Rowe (England) Rosalind Rowe	(Scotland) Helen Elliott (Austria) Ermelinde Wertl
1952	Bombay	(Japan) Shizuki Narahara (Japan) Tomie Nishimura	(England) Diane Rowe (England) Rosalind Rowe	(Hungary) Gizella Farkas (Hungary) Edit Sági
1953	Bucharest	(Hungary) Gizella Gervai (Romania) Angelica Rozeanu	(England) Diane Rowe (England) Rosalind Rowe	(England) Kathleen Best (Austria) Ermelinde Wertl
1953	Bucharest	(Hungary) Gizella Gervai (Romania) Angelica Rozeanu	(England) Diane Rowe (England) Rosalind Rowe	(Hungary) Zsuzsa Fantusz (Hungary) Edit Sági
1954	Wembley	(England) Diane Rowe (England) Rosalind Rowe	(England) Kathleen Best (England) Ann Haydon	(Japan) Fujie Eguchi (Japan) Kiiko Watanabe
1954	Wembley	(England) Diane Rowe (England) Rosalind Rowe	(England) Kathleen Best (England) Ann Haydon	(Hungary) Gizella Gervai (Romania) Angelica Rozeanu
1955	Utrecht	(Romania) Angelica Rozeanu (Romania) Ella Zeller	(England) Diane Rowe (England) Rosalind Rowe	(Japan) Fujie Eguchi (Japan) Kiiko Watanabe
1955	Utrecht	(Romania) Angelica Rozeanu (Romania) Ella Zeller	(England) Diane Rowe (England) Rosalind Rowe	(Japan) Shizuki Narahara (Japan) Yoshiko Tanaka
1956	Tokyo	(Romania) Angelica Rozeanu (Romania) Ella Zeller	(Japan) Fujie Eguchi (Japan) Kiiko Watanabe	(England) Ann Haydon (England) Diane Rowe
1956	Tokyo	(Romania) Angelica Rozeanu (Romania) Ella Zeller	(Japan) Fujie Eguchi (Japan) Kiiko Watanabe	(Japan) Tomie Okawa (Japan) Yoshiko Tanaka
1957	Stockholm	(Hungary) Lívia Mossóczy (Hungary) Agnes Simon	(England) Ann Haydon (England) Diane Rowe	(Scotland) Helen Elliot (Romania) Maria Golopenta
1957	Stockholm	(Hungary) Lívia Mossóczy (Hungary) Agnes Simon	(England) Ann Haydon (England) Diane Rowe	(Romania) Angelica Rozeanu (Romania) Ella Zeller
1959	Dortmund	(Japan) Taeko Namba (Japan) Kazuko Yamaizumi	(Japan) Fujie Eguchi (Japan) Kimiyo Matsuzaki	(England) Ann Haydon (England) Diane Rowe
1959	Dortmund	(Japan) Taeko Namba (Japan) Kazuko Yamaizumi	(Japan) Fujie Eguchi (Japan) Kimiyo Matsuzaki	(China) Qiu Zhonghui (China) Sun Meiying
1961	Beijing	(Romania) Maria Alexandru (Romania) Georgeta Pitică	(China) Qiu Zhonghui (China) Sun Meiying	(China) Han Yuzhen (China) Liang Lizhen
1961	Beijing	(Romania) Maria Alexandru (Romania) Georgeta Pitică	(China) Qiu Zhonghui (China) Sun Meiying	(China) Hu Keming (China) Wang Jian
1963	Prague	(Japan) Kimiyo Matsuzaki (Japan) Masako Seki	(England) Diane Rowe (England) Mary Shannon	(Japan) Kazuko Ito-Yamaizumi (Japan) Noriko Yamanaka
1963	Prague	(Japan) Kimiyo Matsuzaki (Japan) Masako Seki	(England) Diane Rowe (England) Mary Shannon	(China) Qiu Zhonghui (China) Wang Jian
1965	Ljubljana	(China) Lin Huiqing (China) Zheng Minzhi	(Japan) Masako Seki (Japan) Noriko Yamanaka	(China) Feng Mengya (China) Li Li
1965	Ljubljana	(China) Lin Huiqing (China) Zheng Minzhi	(Japan) Masako Seki (Japan) Noriko Yamanaka	(China) Li Henan (China) Liang Lizhen
1967	Stockholm	(Japan) Saeko Hirota (Japan) Sachiko Morisawa	(Japan) Naoko Fukatsu (Japan) Noriko Yamanaka	(Soviet Union) Svetlana Grinberg (Soviet Union) Zoja Rudnova
1967	Stockholm	(Japan) Saeko Hirota (Japan) Sachiko Morisawa	(Japan) Naoko Fukatsu (Japan) Noriko Yamanaka	(Hungary) Erzsebet Jurik (Hungary) Éva Kóczián
1969	Munich	(Soviet Union) Svetlana Grinberg (Soviet Union) Zoja Rudnova	(Romania) Maria Alexandru (Romania) Eleonora Mihalca	(South Korea) Choi Hwan-hwan (South Korea) Choi Jung-sook
1969	Munich	(Soviet Union) Svetlana Grinberg (Soviet Union) Zoja Rudnova	(Romania) Maria Alexandru (Romania) Eleonora Mihalca	(Czechoslovakia) Jitka Karlíková (Czechoslovakia) Ilona Voštová
1971	Nagoya	(China) Lin Huiqing (China) Zheng Minzhi	(Japan) Mieko Hirano (Japan) Reiko Sakamoto	(Japan) Miho Hamada (Japan) Yukie Ozeki
1971	Nagoya	(China) Lin Huiqing (China) Zheng Minzhi	(Japan) Mieko Hirano (Japan) Reiko Sakamoto	(Japan) Yukiko Kawamorita (Japan) Setsuko Kobori
1973	Sarajevo	(Romania) Maria Alexandru (Japan) Miho Hamada	(China) Lin Meiqun (China) Qiu Baoqin	(Japan) Tazuko Abe (Japan) Tomie Edano
1973	Sarajevo	(Romania) Maria Alexandru (Japan) Miho Hamada	(China) Lin Meiqun (China) Qiu Baoqin	(England) Jill Hammersley (Hungary) Beatrix Kisházi
1975	Calcutta	(Romania) Maria Alexandru (Japan) Shoko Takahashi	(China) Lin Meiqun (China) Zhu Xiangyun	(Soviet Union) Elmira Antonyan (Soviet Union) Tatiana Ferdman
1975	Calcutta	(Romania) Maria Alexandru (Japan) Shoko Takahashi	(China) Lin Meiqun (China) Zhu Xiangyun	(Japan) Yukie Ozeki (Japan) Sachiko Yokota
1977	Birmingham	(North Korea) Pak Yong-ok (China) Yang Ying (born 1953)	(China) Wei Lijie (China) Zhu Xiangyun	(China) Ge Xin'ai (China) Zhang Li
1977	Birmingham	(North Korea) Pak Yong-ok (China) Yang Ying (born 1953)	(China) Wei Lijie (China) Zhu Xiangyun	(South Korea) Kim Soon-ok (South Korea) Lee Ki-won
1979	Pyongyang	(China) Zhang Deying (China) Zhang Li	(China) Ge Xin'ai (China) Yan Guili	(North Korea) Li Song-suk (North Korea) Ro Jong-suk
1979	Pyongyang	(China) Zhang Deying (China) Zhang Li	(China) Ge Xin'ai (China) Yan Guili	(Socialist Federal Republic of Yugoslavia) Erzsebet Palatinus (Socialist Federal Republic of Yugoslavia) Gordana Perkučin
1981	Novi Sad	(China) Cao Yanhua (China) Zhang Deying	(China) Pu Qijuan (China) Tong Ling	(South Korea) An Hae-sook (South Korea) Hwang Nam-sook
1981	Novi Sad	(China) Cao Yanhua (China) Zhang Deying	(China) Pu Qijuan (China) Tong Ling	(China) Huang Junqun (China) Yan Guili
1983	Tokyo	(China) Dai Lili (China) Shen Jianping	(China) Geng Lijuan (China) Huang Junqun	(China) Cao Yanhua (China) Ni Xialian
1983	Tokyo	(China) Dai Lili (China) Shen Jianping	(China) Geng Lijuan (China) Huang Junqun	(China) Pu Qijuan (China) Tong Ling
1985	Gothenburg	(China) Dai Lili (China) Geng Lijuan	(China) Cao Yanhua (China) Ni Xialian	(China) Guan Jianhua (China) Tong Ling
1985	Gothenburg	(China) Dai Lili (China) Geng Lijuan	(China) Cao Yanhua (China) Ni Xialian	(China) Jiao Zhimin (China) Qi Baoxiang
1987	New Delhi	(South Korea) Hyun Jung-hwa (South Korea) Yang Young-ja	(China) Dai Lili (China) Li Huifen	(North Korea) Cho Jong-hui (North Korea) Li Bun-hui
1987	New Delhi	(South Korea) Hyun Jung-hwa (South Korea) Yang Young-ja	(China) Dai Lili (China) Li Huifen	(China) He Zhili (China) Jiao Zhimin
1989	Dortmund	(China) Deng Yaping (China) Qiao Hong	(China) Chen Jing (China) Hu Xiaoxin	(China) Ding Yaping (China) Li Jun
1989	Dortmund	(China) Deng Yaping (China) Qiao Hong	(China) Chen Jing (China) Hu Xiaoxin	(China) Gao Jun (China) Liu Wei
1991	Chiba City	(China) Chen Zihe (China) Gao Jun	(China) Deng Yaping (China) Qiao Hong	(China) Ding Yaping (China) Li Jun
1991	Chiba City	(China) Chen Zihe (China) Gao Jun	(China) Deng Yaping (China) Qiao Hong	(China) Hu Xiaoxin (China) Liu Wei
1993	Gothenburg	(China) Liu Wei (China) Qiao Yunping	(China) Deng Yaping (China) Qiao Hong	(Hong Kong) Chai Po Wa (Hong Kong) Chan Tan Lui
1993	Gothenburg	(China) Liu Wei (China) Qiao Yunping	(China) Deng Yaping (China) Qiao Hong	(China) Chen Zihe (China) Gao Jun
1995	Tianjin	(China) Deng Yaping (China) Qiao Hong	(China) Liu Wei (China) Qiao Yunping	(Hungary) Csilla Bátorfi (Hungary) Krisztina Tóth
1995	Tianjin	(China) Deng Yaping (China) Qiao Hong	(China) Liu Wei (China) Qiao Yunping	(China) Wang Chen (China) Wu Na
1997	Manchester	(China) Deng Yaping (China) Yang Ying (born 1977)	(China) Li Ju (China) Wang Nan	(Hong Kong) Chai Po Wa (China) Qiao Yunping
1997	Manchester	(China) Deng Yaping (China) Yang Ying (born 1977)	(China) Li Ju (China) Wang Nan	(China) Cheng Hongxia (China) Wang Hui
1999	Eindhoven	(China) Li Ju (China) Wang Nan	(China) Sun Jin (China) Yang Ying (born 1977)	(South Korea) Kim Moo-kyo (South Korea) Park Hae-jung
1999	Eindhoven	(China) Li Ju (China) Wang Nan	(China) Sun Jin (China) Yang Ying (born 1977)	(China) Zhang Yingying (China) Zhang Yining
2001	Osaka	(China) Li Ju (China) Wang Nan	(China) Sun Jin (China) Yang Ying (born 1977)	(Japan) Mayu Kishi-Kawagoe (Japan) Akiko Takeda
2001	Osaka	(China) Li Ju (China) Wang Nan	(China) Sun Jin (China) Yang Ying (born 1977)	(China) Zhang Yingying (China) Zhang Yining
2003	Paris	(China) Wang Nan (China) Zhang Yining	(China) Guo Yue (China) Niu Jianfeng	(South Korea) Lee Eun-sil (South Korea) Seok Eun-mi
2003	Paris	(China) Wang Nan (China) Zhang Yining	(China) Guo Yue (China) Niu Jianfeng	(China) Li Jia (China) Li Ju
2005	Shanghai	(China) Wang Nan (China) Zhang Yining	(China) Guo Yue (China) Niu Jianfeng	(China) Bai Yang (China) Guo Yan
2005	Shanghai	(China) Wang Nan (China) Zhang Yining	(China) Guo Yue (China) Niu Jianfeng	(Hong Kong) Tie Ya Na (Hong Kong) Zhang Rui
2007	Zagreb	(China) Wang Nan (China) Zhang Yining	(China) Guo Yue (China) Li Xiaoxia	(South Korea) Kim Kyung-ah (South Korea) Park Mi-young
2007	Zagreb	(China) Wang Nan (China) Zhang Yining	(China) Guo Yue (China) Li Xiaoxia	(Singapore) Li Jiawei (Singapore) Wang Yuegu
2009	Yokohama	(China) Guo Yue (China) Li Xiaoxia	(China) Ding Ning (China) Guo Yan	(Hong Kong) Jiang Huajun (Hong Kong) Tie Ya Na
2009	Yokohama	(China) Guo Yue (China) Li Xiaoxia	(China) Ding Ning (China) Guo Yan	(South Korea) Kim Kyung-ah (South Korea) Park Mi-young
2011	Rotterdam	(China) Guo Yue (China) Li Xiaoxia	(China) Ding Ning (China) Guo Yan	(Hong Kong) Jiang Huajun (Hong Kong) Tie Ya Na
2011	Rotterdam	(China) Guo Yue (China) Li Xiaoxia	(China) Ding Ning (China) Guo Yan	(South Korea) Kim Kyung-ah (South Korea) Park Mi-young
2013	Paris	(China) Guo Yue (China) Li Xiaoxia	(China) Ding Ning (China) Liu Shiwen	(China) Chen Meng (China) Zhu Yuling
2013	Paris	(China) Guo Yue (China) Li Xiaoxia	(China) Ding Ning (China) Liu Shiwen	(Singapore) Feng Tianwei (Singapore) Yu Mengyu
2015	Suzhou	(China) Liu Shiwen (China) Zhu Yuling	(China) Ding Ning (China) Li Xiaoxia	(Singapore) Feng Tianwei (Singapore) Yu Mengyu
2015	Suzhou	(China) Liu Shiwen (China) Zhu Yuling	(China) Ding Ning (China) Li Xiaoxia	(Netherlands) Li Jie (Poland) Li Qian
2017	Düsseldorf	(China) Ding Ning (China) Liu Shiwen	(China) Chen Meng (China) Zhu Yuling	(Singapore) Feng Tianwei (Singapore) Yu Mengyu
2017	Düsseldorf	(China) Ding Ning (China) Liu Shiwen	(China) Chen Meng (China) Zhu Yuling	(Japan) Hina Hayata (Japan) Mima Ito
2019	Budapest	(China) Sun Yingsha (China) Wang Manyu	(Japan) Hina Hayata (Japan) Mima Ito	(China) Chen Meng (China) Zhu Yuling
2019	Budapest	(China) Sun Yingsha (China) Wang Manyu	(Japan) Hina Hayata (Japan) Mima Ito	(Japan) Honoka Hashimoto (Japan) Hitomi Sato
2021	Houston	(China) Sun Yingsha (China) Wang Manyu	(Japan) Hina Hayata (Japan) Mima Ito	(China) Chen Meng (China) Qian Tianyi
2021	Houston	(China) Sun Yingsha (China) Wang Manyu	(Japan) Hina Hayata (Japan) Mima Ito	(Luxembourg) Sarah de Nutte (Luxembourg) Ni Xialian
2023	Durban	(China) Chen Meng (China) Wang Yidi	(South Korea) Jeon Ji-hee (South Korea) Shin Yu-bin	(Japan) Miyuu Kihara (Japan) Miyu Nagasaki
2023	Durban	(China) Chen Meng (China) Wang Yidi	(South Korea) Jeon Ji-hee (South Korea) Shin Yu-bin	(China) Sun Yingsha (China) Wang Manyu
2025	Doha	(China) Kuai Man (China) Wang Manyu	(Austria) Sofia Polcanova (Romania) Bernadette Szőcs	(Japan) Miwa Harimoto (Japan) Miyuu Kihara
2025	Doha	(China) Kuai Man (China) Wang Manyu	(Austria) Sofia Polcanova (Romania) Bernadette Szőcs	(South Korea) Ryu Han-na (South Korea) Shin Yu-bin

==== Medal table ====
Rank	Nation	Gold	Silver	Bronze	Total
1	China	25.5	24	28.5	78
2	Hungary	9	4.5	11	24.5
3	Japan	5	7	14	26
4	Romania	4.5	4	2	10.5
5	England	3.5	9	9	21.5
6	Czechoslovakia	3	3	8.5	14.5
7	Germany	2	1	4.5	7.5
8	Austria	1	1.5	4.5	7
9	South Korea	1	1	9	11
10	Scotland	1	0.5	1	2.5
11	Soviet Union	1	0	2	3
12	North Korea	0.5	0	2	2.5
13	United States	0	1	4	5
14	Wales	0	0.5	0	0.5
15	Hong Kong	0	0	4.5	4.5
16	Singapore	0	0	4	4
17	Belgium	0	0	1	1
17	Luxembourg	0	0	1	1
17	Yugoslavia	0	0	1	1
20	Egypt	0	0	0.5	0.5
20	Netherlands	0	0	0.5	0.5
20	Poland	0	0	0.5	0.5
Totals (22 entries)		57	57	113	227

=== Mixed doubles ===
Year	Host city	Gold	Silver	Bronze
1926	London	(Kingdom of Hungary) Zoltán Mechlovits (Kingdom of Hungary) Mária Mednyánszky	(Kingdom of Hungary) Roland Jacobi (England) Linda Gleeson	(England) H.A. Bennett (England) Winifred Land
1926	London	(Kingdom of Hungary) Zoltán Mechlovits (Kingdom of Hungary) Mária Mednyánszky	(Kingdom of Hungary) Roland Jacobi (England) Linda Gleeson	(Austria) Eduard Freudenheim (Austria) Gertrude Wildam
1928	Stockholm	(Kingdom of Hungary) Zoltán Mechlovits (Kingdom of Hungary) Mária Mednyánszky	(Kingdom of Hungary) Daniel Pecsi (Weimar Republic) Erika Metzger	(England) Charles Bull (England) Joan Ingram
1928	Stockholm	(Kingdom of Hungary) Zoltán Mechlovits (Kingdom of Hungary) Mária Mednyánszky	(Kingdom of Hungary) Daniel Pecsi (Weimar Republic) Erika Metzger	(England) Fred Perry (England) Winifred Land
1929	Budapest	(Kingdom of Hungary) Stephen Kelen (Kingdom of Hungary) Anna Sipos	(Kingdom of Hungary) Laszlo Bellak (Kingdom of Hungary) Magda Gál	(Austria) Alfred Liebster (Austria) Gertrude Wildam
1929	Budapest	(Kingdom of Hungary) Stephen Kelen (Kingdom of Hungary) Anna Sipos	(Kingdom of Hungary) Laszlo Bellak (Kingdom of Hungary) Magda Gál	(Kingdom of Hungary) Zoltán Mechlovits (Kingdom of Hungary) Mária Mednyánszky
1930	Berlin	(Kingdom of Hungary) Miklós Szabados (Kingdom of Hungary) Mária Mednyánszky	(Kingdom of Hungary) Stephen Kelen (Kingdom of Hungary) Anna Sipos	(Kingdom of Hungary) Viktor Barna (Kingdom of Hungary) Magda Gál
1930	Berlin	(Kingdom of Hungary) Miklós Szabados (Kingdom of Hungary) Mária Mednyánszky	(Kingdom of Hungary) Stephen Kelen (Kingdom of Hungary) Anna Sipos	(Kingdom of Hungary) Sándor Glancz (Weimar Republic) Ingeborg Carnatz
1931	Budapest	(Kingdom of Hungary) Miklós Szabados (Kingdom of Hungary) Mária Mednyánszky	(Kingdom of Hungary) Viktor Barna (Kingdom of Hungary) Anna Sipos	(Kingdom of Hungary) Laszlo Bellak (Kingdom of Hungary) Márta Komáromi
1931	Budapest	(Kingdom of Hungary) Miklós Szabados (Kingdom of Hungary) Mária Mednyánszky	(Kingdom of Hungary) Viktor Barna (Kingdom of Hungary) Anna Sipos	(Kingdom of Hungary) Sándor Glancz (Kingdom of Hungary) Magda Gál
1932	Prague	(Kingdom of Hungary) Viktor Barna (Kingdom of Hungary) Anna Sipos	(Kingdom of Hungary) Miklós Szabados (Kingdom of Hungary) Mária Mednyánszky	(Kingdom of Hungary) Sándor Glancz (Kingdom of Hungary) Magda Gál
1932	Prague	(Kingdom of Hungary) Viktor Barna (Kingdom of Hungary) Anna Sipos	(Kingdom of Hungary) Miklós Szabados (Kingdom of Hungary) Mária Mednyánszky	(Czechoslovakia) Jaroslav Jílek (Czechoslovakia) Marie Šmídová
1933	Baden bei Wien	(Kingdom of Hungary) Stephen Kelen (Kingdom of Hungary) Mária Mednyánszky	(Kingdom of Hungary) Sándor Glancz (Kingdom of Hungary) Magda Gál	(Kingdom of Hungary) Viktor Barna (Kingdom of Hungary) Anna Sipos
1933	Baden bei Wien	(Kingdom of Hungary) Stephen Kelen (Kingdom of Hungary) Mária Mednyánszky	(Kingdom of Hungary) Sándor Glancz (Kingdom of Hungary) Magda Gál	(Weimar Republic) Nikita Madjaroglou (Weimar Republic) Annemarie Schulz
1934	Paris	(Kingdom of Hungary) Miklós Szabados (Kingdom of Hungary) Mária Mednyánszky	(Kingdom of Hungary) Viktor Barna (Kingdom of Hungary) Anna Sipos	(Kingdom of Hungary) Laszlo Bellak (England) Kathleen Berry
1934	Paris	(Kingdom of Hungary) Miklós Szabados (Kingdom of Hungary) Mária Mednyánszky	(Kingdom of Hungary) Viktor Barna (Kingdom of Hungary) Anna Sipos	(Czechoslovakia) Stanislav Kolář (Czechoslovakia) Marie Šmídová
1935	Wembley	(Kingdom of Hungary) Viktor Barna (Kingdom of Hungary) Anna Sipos	(Czechoslovakia) Stanislav Kolář (Czechoslovakia) Marie Kettnerová	(England) Adrian Haydon (England) Margaret Osborne
1935	Wembley	(Kingdom of Hungary) Viktor Barna (Kingdom of Hungary) Anna Sipos	(Czechoslovakia) Stanislav Kolář (Czechoslovakia) Marie Kettnerová	(Kingdom of Hungary) Miklós Szabados (Kingdom of Hungary) Mária Mednyánszky
1936	Prague	(Czechoslovakia) Miloslav Hamr (Czechoslovakia) Gertrude Kleinová	(Kingdom of Hungary) Stephen Kelen (Kingdom of Hungary) Mária Mednyánszky	(Czechoslovakia) Stanislav Kolář (Czechoslovakia) Marie Šmídová
1936	Prague	(Czechoslovakia) Miloslav Hamr (Czechoslovakia) Gertrude Kleinová	(Kingdom of Hungary) Stephen Kelen (Kingdom of Hungary) Mária Mednyánszky	(Nazi Germany) Helmut Ullrich (Nazi Germany) Annemarie Schulz
1937	Baden bei Wien	(Czechoslovakia) Bohumil Váňa (Czechoslovakia) Věra Votrubcová	(Czechoslovakia) Stanislav Kolář (Czechoslovakia) Marie Kettnerová	(United States) Abe Berenbaum (United States) Emily Fuller
1937	Baden bei Wien	(Czechoslovakia) Bohumil Váňa (Czechoslovakia) Věra Votrubcová	(Czechoslovakia) Stanislav Kolář (Czechoslovakia) Marie Kettnerová	(Romania) Geza Eros (Romania) Angelica Adelstein
1938	Wembley	(Kingdom of Hungary) Laszlo Bellak (England) Wendy Woodhead	(Czechoslovakia) Bohumil Váňa (Czechoslovakia) Věra Votrubcová	(Austria) Alfred Liebster (Austria) Gertrude Pritzi
1938	Wembley	(Kingdom of Hungary) Laszlo Bellak (England) Wendy Woodhead	(Czechoslovakia) Bohumil Váňa (Czechoslovakia) Věra Votrubcová	(Czechoslovakia) Václav Tereba (Czechoslovakia) Marie Kettnerová
1939	Cairo	(Czechoslovakia) Bohumil Váňa (Czechoslovakia) Věra Votrubcová	(Czechoslovakia) Václav Tereba (Czechoslovakia) Marie Kettnerová	(Egypt) Marcel Geargoura (Nazi Germany) Hilde Bussmann
1939	Cairo	(Czechoslovakia) Bohumil Váňa (Czechoslovakia) Věra Votrubcová	(Czechoslovakia) Václav Tereba (Czechoslovakia) Marie Kettnerová	(Egypt) Mansour Helmy (Nazi Germany) Gertrude Pritzi
1947	Paris	(Hungary) Ferenc Soos (Hungary) Gizella Farkas	(Czechoslovakia) Adolf Šlár (Czechoslovakia) Vlasta Depetrisová	(England) Viktor Barna (England) Margaret Franks
1947	Paris	(Hungary) Ferenc Soos (Hungary) Gizella Farkas	(Czechoslovakia) Adolf Šlár (Czechoslovakia) Vlasta Depetrisová	(United States) William Holzrichter (United States) Davida Hawthorn
1948	Wembley	(United States) Dick Miles (United States) Thelma Thall	(Czechoslovakia) Bohumil Váňa (Czechoslovakia) Vlasta Pokorna	(England) Richard Bergmann (England) Dora Beregi
1948	Wembley	(United States) Dick Miles (United States) Thelma Thall	(Czechoslovakia) Bohumil Váňa (Czechoslovakia) Vlasta Pokorna	(Hungary) Ferenc Sidó (Romania) Angelica Rozeanu
1949	Stockholm	(Hungary) Ferenc Sidó (Hungary) Gizella Farkas	(Czechoslovakia) Bohumil Váňa (Czechoslovakia) Kveta Hrusakova	(England) Johnny Leach (England) Margaret Franks
1949	Stockholm	(Hungary) Ferenc Sidó (Hungary) Gizella Farkas	(Czechoslovakia) Bohumil Váňa (Czechoslovakia) Kveta Hrusakova	(United States) Marty Reisman (United States) Peggy McLean
1950	Budapest	(Hungary) Ferenc Sidó (Hungary) Gizella Farkas	(Czechoslovakia) Bohumil Váňa (Czechoslovakia) Kveta Hrusakova	(Czechoslovakia) Ivan Andreadis (Czechoslovakia) Eliška Fürstová
1950	Budapest	(Hungary) Ferenc Sidó (Hungary) Gizella Farkas	(Czechoslovakia) Bohumil Váňa (Czechoslovakia) Kveta Hrusakova	(Czechoslovakia) Ladislav Štípek (Romania) Angelica Rozeanu
1951	Vienna	(Czechoslovakia) Bohumil Váňa (Romania) Angelica Rozeanu	(Socialist Federal Republic of Yugoslavia) Vilim Harangozo (Austria) Ermelinde Wertl	(Hungary) József Kóczián (Hungary) Rozsi Karpati
1951	Vienna	(Czechoslovakia) Bohumil Váňa (Romania) Angelica Rozeanu	(Socialist Federal Republic of Yugoslavia) Vilim Harangozo (Austria) Ermelinde Wertl	(England) Johnny Leach (England) Diane Rowe
1952	Bombay	(Hungary) Ferenc Sidó (Romania) Angelica Rozeanu	(England) Johnny Leach (England) Diane Rowe	(England) Viktor Barna (England) Rosalind Rowe
1952	Bombay	(Hungary) Ferenc Sidó (Romania) Angelica Rozeanu	(England) Johnny Leach (England) Diane Rowe	(Hungary) József Kóczián (Hungary) Gizella Farkas
1953	Bucharest	(Hungary) Ferenc Sidó (Romania) Angelica Rozeanu	(Socialist Federal Republic of Yugoslavia) Žarko Dolinar (Austria) Ermelinde Wertl	(Hungary) László Földy (Hungary) Éva Kóczián
1953	Bucharest	(Hungary) Ferenc Sidó (Romania) Angelica Rozeanu	(Socialist Federal Republic of Yugoslavia) Žarko Dolinar (Austria) Ermelinde Wertl	(Hungary) József Kóczián (Hungary) Gizella Gervai
1954	Wembley	(Czechoslovakia) Ivan Andreadis (Hungary) Gizella Gervai	(Japan) Yoshio Tomita (Japan) Fujie Eguchi	(England) Viktor Barna (England) Rosalind Rowe
1954	Wembley	(Czechoslovakia) Ivan Andreadis (Hungary) Gizella Gervai	(Japan) Yoshio Tomita (Japan) Fujie Eguchi	(Socialist Federal Republic of Yugoslavia) Žarko Dolinar (Austria) Ermelinde Wertl
1955	Utrecht	(Hungary) Kálmán Szepesi (Hungary) Éva Kóczián	(England) Aubrey Simons (Scotland) Helen Elliot	(Czechoslovakia) Ladislav Štípek (Czechoslovakia) Eliška Krejčová
1955	Utrecht	(Hungary) Kálmán Szepesi (Hungary) Éva Kóczián	(England) Aubrey Simons (Scotland) Helen Elliot	(Japan) Toshiaki Tanaka (Japan) Shizuki Narahara
1956	Tokyo	(United States) Erwin Klein (United States) Leah Neuberger	(Czechoslovakia) Ivan Andreadis (England) Ann Haydon	(Japan) Motoo Fujii (Japan) Yoshiko Tanaka
1956	Tokyo	(United States) Erwin Klein (United States) Leah Neuberger	(Czechoslovakia) Ivan Andreadis (England) Ann Haydon	(Romania) Toma Reiter (Romania) Ella Zeller
1957	Stockholm	(Japan) Ichiro Ogimura (Japan) Fujie Eguchi	(Czechoslovakia) Ivan Andreadis (England) Ann Haydon	(Japan) Keisuke Tsunoda (Japan) Taeko Namba
1957	Stockholm	(Japan) Ichiro Ogimura (Japan) Fujie Eguchi	(Czechoslovakia) Ivan Andreadis (England) Ann Haydon	(Czechoslovakia) Ludvík Vyhnanovský (Scotland) Helen Elliot
1959	Dortmund	(Japan) Ichiro Ogimura (Japan) Fujie Eguchi	(Japan) Teruo Murakami (Japan) Kimiyo Matsuzaki	(Hungary) Zoltán Berczik (Hungary) Gizella Lantos
1959	Dortmund	(Japan) Ichiro Ogimura (Japan) Fujie Eguchi	(Japan) Teruo Murakami (Japan) Kimiyo Matsuzaki	(China) Wang Chuanyao (China) Sun Meiying
1961	Beijing	(Japan) Ichiro Ogimura (Japan) Kimiyo Matsuzaki	(China) Li Furong (China) Han Yuzhen	(Japan) Nobuya Hoshino (Japan) Masako Seki
1961	Beijing	(Japan) Ichiro Ogimura (Japan) Kimiyo Matsuzaki	(China) Li Furong (China) Han Yuzhen	(China) Wang Chuanyao (China) Sun Meiying
1963	Prague	(Japan) Koji Kimura (Japan) Kazuko Ito-Yamaizumi	(Japan) Keiichi Miki (Japan) Masako Seki	(Hungary) János Faházi (Hungary) Éva Kóczián-Földy
1963	Prague	(Japan) Koji Kimura (Japan) Kazuko Ito-Yamaizumi	(Japan) Keiichi Miki (Japan) Masako Seki	(China) Zhuang Zedong (China) Qiu Zhonghui
1965	Ljubljana	(Japan) Koji Kimura (Japan) Masako Seki	(China) Zhang Xielin (China) Lin Huiqing	(Japan) Ken Konaka (Japan) Naoko Fukatsu
1965	Ljubljana	(Japan) Koji Kimura (Japan) Masako Seki	(China) Zhang Xielin (China) Lin Huiqing	(China) Zhuang Zedong (China) Liang Lizhen
1967	Stockholm	(Japan) Nobuhiko Hasegawa (Japan) Noriko Yamanaka	(Japan) Koji Kimura (Japan) Naoko Fukatsu	(Soviet Union) Anatoly Amelin (Soviet Union) Zoja Rudnova
1967	Stockholm	(Japan) Nobuhiko Hasegawa (Japan) Noriko Yamanaka	(Japan) Koji Kimura (Japan) Naoko Fukatsu	(Romania) Dorin Giurgiuca (Romania) Maria Alexandru
1969	Munich	(Japan) Nobuhiko Hasegawa (Japan) Yasuko Konno	(Japan) Mitsuru Kono (Japan) Saeko Hirota	(Japan) Shigeo Itoh (Japan) Toshiko Kowada
1969	Munich	(Japan) Nobuhiko Hasegawa (Japan) Yasuko Konno	(Japan) Mitsuru Kono (Japan) Saeko Hirota	(England) Denis Neale (England) Mary Wright
1971	Nagoya	(China) Zhang Xielin (China) Lin Huiqing	(Socialist Federal Republic of Yugoslavia) Antun Stipančić (Romania) Maria Alexandru	(Japan) Tokuyasu Nishii (Japan) Mieko Fukuno
1971	Nagoya	(China) Zhang Xielin (China) Lin Huiqing	(Socialist Federal Republic of Yugoslavia) Antun Stipančić (Romania) Maria Alexandru	(West Germany) Eberhard Schöler (West Germany) Diane Schöler
1973	Sarajevo	(China) Liang Geliang (China) Li Li	(Soviet Union) Anatoli Strokatov (Soviet Union) Asta Gedraitite	(Czechoslovakia) Josef Dvořáček (Czechoslovakia) Alica Grofová
1973	Sarajevo	(China) Liang Geliang (China) Li Li	(Soviet Union) Anatoli Strokatov (Soviet Union) Asta Gedraitite	(China) Yu Changchun (China) Zheng Huaiying
1975	Calcutta	(Soviet Union) Stanislav Gomozkov (Soviet Union) Tatiana Ferdman	(Soviet Union) Sarkis Sarchayan (Soviet Union) Elmira Antonyan	(Japan) Shigeo Itoh (Japan) Yukie Ozeki
1975	Calcutta	(Soviet Union) Stanislav Gomozkov (Soviet Union) Tatiana Ferdman	(Soviet Union) Sarkis Sarchayan (Soviet Union) Elmira Antonyan	(China) Liang Geliang (China) Zhang Li
1977	Birmingham	(France) Jacques Secrétin (France) Claude Bergeret	(Japan) Tokio Tasaka (Japan) Sachiko Yokota	(South Korea) Lee Sang-kuk (South Korea) Lee Ki-won
1977	Birmingham	(France) Jacques Secrétin (France) Claude Bergeret	(Japan) Tokio Tasaka (Japan) Sachiko Yokota	(China) Li Zhenshi (China) Yan Guili
1979	Pyongyang	(China) Liang Geliang (China) Ge Xin'ai	(China) Li Zhenshi (China) Yan Guili	(France) Jacques Secrétin (France) Claude Bergeret
1979	Pyongyang	(China) Liang Geliang (China) Ge Xin'ai	(China) Li Zhenshi (China) Yan Guili	(China) Wang Huiyuan (China) Zhang Deying
1981	Novi Sad	(China) Xie Saike (China) Huang Junqun	(China) Chen Xinhua (China) Tong Ling	(China) Huang Liang (China) Pu Qijuan
1981	Novi Sad	(China) Xie Saike (China) Huang Junqun	(China) Chen Xinhua (China) Tong Ling	(Socialist Federal Republic of Yugoslavia) Dragutin Šurbek (Socialist Federal Republic of Yugoslavia) Branka Batinić
1983	Tokyo	(China) Guo Yuehua (China) Ni Xialian	(China) Chen Xinhua (China) Tong Ling	(China) Cai Zhenhua (China) Cao Yanhua
1983	Tokyo	(China) Guo Yuehua (China) Ni Xialian	(China) Chen Xinhua (China) Tong Ling	(China) Xie Saike (China) Huang Junqun
1985	Gothenburg	(China) Cai Zhenhua (China) Cao Yanhua	(Czechoslovakia) Jindřich Panský (Czechoslovakia) Marie Hrachová	(China) Chen Xinhua (China) Tong Ling
1985	Gothenburg	(China) Cai Zhenhua (China) Cao Yanhua	(Czechoslovakia) Jindřich Panský (Czechoslovakia) Marie Hrachová	(China) Fan Changmao (China) Jiao Zhimin
1987	New Delhi	(China) Hui Jun (China) Geng Lijuan	(China) Jiang Jialiang (China) Jiao Zhimin	(South Korea) Ahn Jae-hyung (South Korea) Yang Young-ja
1987	New Delhi	(China) Hui Jun (China) Geng Lijuan	(China) Jiang Jialiang (China) Jiao Zhimin	(China) Wang Hao (China) Guan Jianhua
1989	Dortmund	(South Korea) Yoo Nam-kyu (South Korea) Hyun Jung-hwa	(Socialist Federal Republic of Yugoslavia) Zoran Kalinić (Socialist Federal Republic of Yugoslavia) Gordana Perkučin	(China) Chen Longcan (China) Chen Jing
1989	Dortmund	(South Korea) Yoo Nam-kyu (South Korea) Hyun Jung-hwa	(Socialist Federal Republic of Yugoslavia) Zoran Kalinić (Socialist Federal Republic of Yugoslavia) Gordana Perkučin	(China) Chen Zhibin (China) Gao Jun
1991	Chiba City	(China) Wang Tao (China) Liu Wei	(China) Xie Chaojie (China) Chen Zihe	(Korea) Kim Song-hui (Korea) Li Bun-hui
1991	Chiba City	(China) Wang Tao (China) Liu Wei	(China) Xie Chaojie (China) Chen Zihe	(Greece) Kalinikos Kreanga (Romania) Otilia Badescu
1993	Gothenburg	(China) Wang Tao (China) Liu Wei	(South Korea) Yoo Nam-kyu (South Korea) Hyun Jung-hwa	(North Korea) Li Sung-il (North Korea) Yu Sun-bok
1993	Gothenburg	(China) Wang Tao (China) Liu Wei	(South Korea) Yoo Nam-kyu (South Korea) Hyun Jung-hwa	(China) Ma Wenge (China) Qiao Yunping
1995	Tianjin	(China) Wang Tao (China) Liu Wei	(China) Kong Linghui (China) Deng Yaping	(South Korea) Lee Chul-seung (South Korea) Ryu Ji-hye
1995	Tianjin	(China) Wang Tao (China) Liu Wei	(China) Kong Linghui (China) Deng Yaping	(Sweden) Erik Lindh (Sweden) Marie Svensson
1997	Manchester	(China) Liu Guoliang (China) Wu Na	(China) Kong Linghui (China) Deng Yaping	(Chinese Taipei) Chiang Peng-lung (Chinese Taipei) Chen Jing
1997	Manchester	(China) Liu Guoliang (China) Wu Na	(China) Kong Linghui (China) Deng Yaping	(China) Wang Liqin (China) Wang Nan
1999	Eindhoven	(China) Ma Lin (China) Zhang Yingying	(China) Feng Zhe (China) Sun Jin	(China) Qin Zhijian (China) Yang Ying
1999	Eindhoven	(China) Ma Lin (China) Zhang Yingying	(China) Feng Zhe (China) Sun Jin	(China) Wang Liqin (China) Wang Nan
2001	Osaka	(China) Qin Zhijian (China) Yang Ying	(South Korea) Oh Sang-eun (South Korea) Kim Moo-kyo	(China) Liu Guoliang (China) Sun Jin
2001	Osaka	(China) Qin Zhijian (China) Yang Ying	(South Korea) Oh Sang-eun (South Korea) Kim Moo-kyo	(China) Zhan Jian (China) Bai Yang
2003	Paris	(China) Ma Lin (China) Wang Nan	(China) Liu Guozheng (China) Bai Yang	(China) Qin Zhijian (China) Niu Jianfeng
2003	Paris	(China) Ma Lin (China) Wang Nan	(China) Liu Guozheng (China) Bai Yang	(China) Wang Hao (China) Li Nan
2005	Shanghai	(China) Wang Liqin (China) Guo Yue	(China) Liu Guozheng (China) Bai Yang	(China) Qiu Yike (China) Cao Zhen
2005	Shanghai	(China) Wang Liqin (China) Guo Yue	(China) Liu Guozheng (China) Bai Yang	(China) Yan Sen (China) Guo Yan
2007	Zagreb	(China) Wang Liqin (China) Guo Yue	(China) Ma Lin (China) Wang Nan	(Hong Kong) Ko Lai Chak (Hong Kong) Tie Ya Na
2007	Zagreb	(China) Wang Liqin (China) Guo Yue	(China) Ma Lin (China) Wang Nan	(China) Qiu Yike (China) Cao Zhen
2009	Yokohama	(China) Li Ping (China) Cao Zhen	(China) Zhang Jike (China) Mu Zi	(China) Hao Shuai (China) Chang Chenchen
2009	Yokohama	(China) Li Ping (China) Cao Zhen	(China) Zhang Jike (China) Mu Zi	(China) Zhang Chao (China) Yao Yan
2011	Rotterdam	(China) Zhang Chao (China) Cao Zhen	(China) Hao Shuai (China) Mu Zi	(Hong Kong) Cheung Yuk (Hong Kong) Jiang Huajun
2011	Rotterdam	(China) Zhang Chao (China) Cao Zhen	(China) Hao Shuai (China) Mu Zi	(Japan) Seiya Kishikawa (Japan) Ai Fukuhara
2013	Paris	(North Korea) Kim Hyok-bong (North Korea) Kim Jong	(South Korea) Lee Sang-su (South Korea) Park Young-sook	(Hong Kong) Cheung Yuk (Hong Kong) Jiang Huajun
2013	Paris	(North Korea) Kim Hyok-bong (North Korea) Kim Jong	(South Korea) Lee Sang-su (South Korea) Park Young-sook	(China) Wang Liqin (China) Rao Jingwen
2015	Suzhou	(China) Xu Xin (South Korea) Yang Ha-eun	(Japan) Maharu Yoshimura (Japan) Kasumi Ishikawa	(North Korea) Kim Hyok-bong (North Korea) Kim Jong
2015	Suzhou	(China) Xu Xin (South Korea) Yang Ha-eun	(Japan) Maharu Yoshimura (Japan) Kasumi Ishikawa	(Hong Kong) Wong Chun-ting (Hong Kong) Doo Hoi Kem
2017	Düsseldorf	(Japan) Maharu Yoshimura (Japan) Kasumi Ishikawa	(Chinese Taipei) Chen Chien-an (Chinese Taipei) Cheng I-ching	(China) Fang Bo (Germany) Petrissa Solja
2017	Düsseldorf	(Japan) Maharu Yoshimura (Japan) Kasumi Ishikawa	(Chinese Taipei) Chen Chien-an (Chinese Taipei) Cheng I-ching	(Hong Kong) Wong Chun-ting (Hong Kong) Doo Hoi Kem
2019	Budapest	(China) Xu Xin (China) Liu Shiwen	(Japan) Maharu Yoshimura (Japan) Kasumi Ishikawa	(China) Fan Zhendong (China) Ding Ning
2019	Budapest	(China) Xu Xin (China) Liu Shiwen	(Japan) Maharu Yoshimura (Japan) Kasumi Ishikawa	(Germany) Patrick Franziska (Germany) Petrissa Solja
2021	Houston	(China) Wang Chuqin (China) Sun Yingsha	(Japan) Tomokazu Harimoto (Japan) Hina Hayata	(China) Lin Gaoyuan (United States) Lily Zhang
2021	Houston	(China) Wang Chuqin (China) Sun Yingsha	(Japan) Tomokazu Harimoto (Japan) Hina Hayata	(Chinese Taipei) Lin Yun-ju (Chinese Taipei) Cheng I-ching
2023	Durban	(China) Wang Chuqin (China) Sun Yingsha	(Japan) Tomokazu Harimoto (Japan) Hina Hayata	(China) Lin Shidong (China) Kuai Man
2023	Durban	(China) Wang Chuqin (China) Sun Yingsha	(Japan) Tomokazu Harimoto (Japan) Hina Hayata	(Hong Kong) Wong Chun-ting (Hong Kong) Doo Hoi Kem
2025	Doha	(China) Wang Chuqin (China) Sun Yingsha	(Japan) Maharu Yoshimura (Japan) Satsuki Odo	(South Korea) Lim Jong-hoon (South Korea) Shin Yu-bin
2025	Doha	(China) Wang Chuqin (China) Sun Yingsha	(Japan) Maharu Yoshimura (Japan) Satsuki Odo	(Hong Kong) Wong Chun-ting (Hong Kong) Doo Hoi Kem

==== Medal table ====
Rank	Nation	Gold	Silver	Bronze	Total
1	China	22.5	15	33	70.5
2	Hungary	15	8	14.5	37.5
3	Japan	8	11	9	28
4	Czechoslovakia	4	10	8	22
5	United States	2	0	3.5	5.5
6	South Korea	1.5	3	4	8.5
7	Romania	1.5	0.5	4.5	6.5
8	Soviet Union	1	2	1	4
9	North Korea	1	0	2	3
10	France	1	0	1	2
11	England	0.5	3	11.5	15
12	Yugoslavia	0	2.5	1.5	4
13	Austria	0	1	3.5	4.5
14	Chinese Taipei	0	1	2	3
15	Germany	0	0.5	5	5.5
16	Scotland	0	0.5	0.5	1
17	Hong Kong	0	0	7	7
18	Egypt	0	0	1	1
18	Korea	0	0	1	1
18	Sweden	0	0	1	1
18	West Germany	0	0	1	1
22	Greece	0	0	0.5	0.5
Totals (22 entries)		58	58	116	232

== Results of team events ==
The tables below are medalists of team events.

=== Men's team ===
Year	Host City	Gold	Silver	Bronze
1926	London	(Kingdom of Hungary) Hungary; Roland Jacobi; Béla von Kehrling; Zoltán Mechlovits; Daniel Pecsi	(Austria) Austria; Paul Flussmann; Eduard Freudenheim; Munio Pillinger	(England) England; Charles Allwright; Bernard Bernstein; Percival Bromfield; Frank Burls; James Thompson
1926	London	(Kingdom of Hungary) Hungary; Roland Jacobi; Béla von Kehrling; Zoltán Mechlovits; Daniel Pecsi	(Austria) Austria; Paul Flussmann; Eduard Freudenheim; Munio Pillinger	(India) British India; Athar-Ali Fyzee; Hassan Ali Fyzee; A.M. Peermahomed; B.C. Singh; S.R.G. Suppiah
1928	Stockholm	(Kingdom of Hungary) Hungary; Laszlo Bellak; Sándor Glancz; Roland Jacobi; Zoltán Mechlovits; Daniel Pecsi	(Austria) Austria; Paul Flussmann; Alfred Liebster; Munio Pillinger; Robert Thum	(England) England; Charles Allwright; Charlie Bull; Adrian Haydon; Charles Mase; Fred Perry
1929	Budapest	(Kingdom of Hungary) Hungary; Viktor Barna; Sándor Glancz; Stephen Kelen; Zoltán Mechlovits; Miklós Szabados	(Austria) Austria; Manfred Feher; Paul Flussmann; Erwin Kohn; Alfred Liebster; Robert Thum	(England) England; Charlie Bull; Frank Burls; Adrian Haydon; Fred Perry; Frank Wilde
1930	Berlin	(Kingdom of Hungary) Hungary; Viktor Barna; Laszlo Bellak; Lajos Dávid; Stephen Kelen; Miklós Szabados	(Sweden) Sweden; Carl-Eric Bulow; Valter Kolmodin; Hille Nilsson; Folke Pettersson; Henry Wilbert	(Czechoslovakia) Czechoslovakia; Mikuláš Fried; Bohumil Hájek; Zdeněk Heydušek; Antonín Maleček; Bedřich Nikodém
1931	Budapest	(Kingdom of Hungary) Hungary; Viktor Barna; Laszlo Bellak; Lajos Dávid; Stephen Kelen; Miklós Szabados	(Czechoslovakia) Czechoslovakia; Stanislav Kolář; Jindřich Lauterbach; Antonín Maleček; Bedřich Nikodém; Karel Svoboda (England) England; Charlie Bull; Adrian Haydon; David Jones; Stanley Proffitt; Tommy Sears	Not awarded, as there was a tie for silver.
1932	Prague	(Czechoslovakia) Czechoslovakia; Michael Grobauer; Stanislav Kolář; Jindřich Lauterbach; Antonín Maleček; Bedřich Nikodém	(Kingdom of Hungary) Hungary; Viktor Barna; Laszlo Bellak; Lajos Dávid; Stephen Kelen; Miklós Szabados	(Austria) Austria; Manfred Feher; Paul Flussmann; Erwin Kohn; Alfred Liebster; Robert Thum
1933	Baden bei Wien	(Kingdom of Hungary) Hungary; Viktor Barna; István Boros; Lajos Dávid; Sándor Glancz; Stephen Kelen	(Czechoslovakia) Czechoslovakia; Oldřich Blecha; Miloslav Hamr; Stanislav Kolář; Erwin Koln-Korda; Karel Svoboda	(Austria) Austria; Manfred Feher; Paul Flussmann; Erwin Kohn; Alfred Liebster; Ferry Weiss
1933	Baden bei Wien	(Kingdom of Hungary) Hungary; Viktor Barna; István Boros; Lajos Dávid; Sándor Glancz; Stephen Kelen	(Czechoslovakia) Czechoslovakia; Oldřich Blecha; Miloslav Hamr; Stanislav Kolář; Erwin Koln-Korda; Karel Svoboda	(England) England; Alec Brook; Adrian Haydon; David Jones; Andrew Millar; Edward Rimer
1934	Paris	(Kingdom of Hungary) Hungary; Viktor Barna; Laszlo Bellak; Lajos Dávid; Tibor Házi; Miklós Szabados	(Austria) Austria; Erwin Kohn; Alfred Liebster; Karl Schediwy (Czechoslovakia) Czechoslovakia; Oldřich Blecha; Miloslav Hamr; Stanislav Kolář; Erwin Koln-Korda; Karel Svoboda	Not awarded, as there was a tie for silver.
1935	Wembley	(Kingdom of Hungary) Hungary; Viktor Barna; Laszlo Bellak; Tibor Házi; Stephen Kelen; Miklós Szabados	(Czechoslovakia) Czechoslovakia; Miloslav Hamr; Stanislav Kolář; Karel Svoboda; Viktor Tobiasch; Bohumil Váňa	(Austria) Austria; Erwin Kohn; Alfred Liebster; Karl Schediwy; Ferry Weiss
1935	Wembley	(Kingdom of Hungary) Hungary; Viktor Barna; Laszlo Bellak; Tibor Házi; Stephen Kelen; Miklós Szabados	(Czechoslovakia) Czechoslovakia; Miloslav Hamr; Stanislav Kolář; Karel Svoboda; Viktor Tobiasch; Bohumil Váňa	(Poland) Poland; Alojzy Ehrlich; Władysław Loewenhertz; Simon Pohoryles
1936	Prague	(Austria) Austria; Richard Bergmann; Helmut Goebel; Hans Hartinger; Erwin Kohn; Alfred Liebster	(Romania) Romania; Farkas Paneth; Marin Vasile-Goldberger; Viktor Vladone	(Czechoslovakia) Czechoslovakia; Miloslav Hamr; Stanislav Kolář; František Hanec Pivec; Václav Tereba; Bohumil Váňa
1936	Prague	(Austria) Austria; Richard Bergmann; Helmut Goebel; Hans Hartinger; Erwin Kohn; Alfred Liebster	(Romania) Romania; Farkas Paneth; Marin Vasile-Goldberger; Viktor Vladone	(France) France; Raoul Bedoc; Charles Dubouillé; Daniel Guérin; Michel Haguenauer; Paul Wolschoefer
1936	Prague	(Austria) Austria; Richard Bergmann; Helmut Goebel; Hans Hartinger; Erwin Kohn; Alfred Liebster	(Romania) Romania; Farkas Paneth; Marin Vasile-Goldberger; Viktor Vladone	(Kingdom of Hungary) Hungary; Viktor Barna; Laszlo Bellak; Tibor Házi; Stephen Kelen; Miklós Szabados
1936	Prague	(Austria) Austria; Richard Bergmann; Helmut Goebel; Hans Hartinger; Erwin Kohn; Alfred Liebster	(Romania) Romania; Farkas Paneth; Marin Vasile-Goldberger; Viktor Vladone	(Poland) Poland; Alojzy Ehrlich; Shimcha Finkelstein; Jezierski; Samuel Schieff
1937	Baden bei Wien	(United States) United States; Abe Berenbaum; Robert Blattner; James McClure; Sol Schiff	(Kingdom of Hungary) Hungary; Viktor Barna; Laszlo Bellak; Istvan Lovaszy; Ferenc Soos; Miklós Szabados	(Czechoslovakia) Czechoslovakia; Miloslav Hamr; Stanislav Kolář; Pavel Löwy; Adolf Šlár; Bohumil Váňa
1938	Wembley	(Kingdom of Hungary) Hungary; Viktor Barna; Laszlo Bellak; Ernő Földi; Tibor Házi; Ferenc Soos	(Austria) Austria; Richard Bergmann; Helmut Goebel; Erich Kaspar; Alfred Liebster; Karl Schediwy	(Czechoslovakia) Czechoslovakia; Miloslav Hamr; Stanislav Kolář; Adolf Šlár; Václav Tereba; Bohumil Váňa
1938	Wembley	(Kingdom of Hungary) Hungary; Viktor Barna; Laszlo Bellak; Ernő Földi; Tibor Házi; Ferenc Soos	(Austria) Austria; Richard Bergmann; Helmut Goebel; Erich Kaspar; Alfred Liebster; Karl Schediwy	(United States) United States; Bernard Grimes; George Hendry; James McClure; Lou Pagliaro; Sol Schiff
1939	Cairo	(Czechoslovakia) Czechoslovakia; Miloslav Hamr; Rudolf Karleček; Václav Tereba; Bohumil Váňa	(Kingdom of Yugoslavia) Yugoslavia; Žarko Dolinar; Tibor Harangozo; Adolf Herskovic; Ladislav Hexner; Max Marinko	(England) England; Ernest Bubley; Ken Hyde; Hyman Lurie; Ken Stanley; Arthur Wilmott
1947	Paris	(Czechoslovakia) Czechoslovakia; Ivan Andreadis; Adolf Šlár; Václav Tereba; František Tokár; Bohumil Váňa	(United States) United States; William Holzrichter; Dick Miles; Lou Pagliaro; Sol Schiff	(Austria) Austria; Heinrich Bednar; Otto Eckl; Johann Hartwich; Heribert Just; Ferdinand Schuech
1947	Paris	(Czechoslovakia) Czechoslovakia; Ivan Andreadis; Adolf Šlár; Václav Tereba; František Tokár; Bohumil Váňa	(United States) United States; William Holzrichter; Dick Miles; Lou Pagliaro; Sol Schiff	(France) France; Alex Agopoff; Guy Amouretti; Maurice Bordrez; Michel Haguenauer; Michel Lanskoy
1948	Wembley	(Czechoslovakia) Czechoslovakia; Ivan Andreadis; Max Marinko; Ladislav Štípek; František Tokár; Bohumil Váňa	(France) France; Guy Amouretti; Maurice Bordrez; Charles Dubouillé; Michel Haguenauer; Eugène Manchiska	(Austria) Austria; Heinrich Bednar; Rudolf Diwald; Otto Eckl; Heribert Just; Herbert Wunsch
1948	Wembley	(Czechoslovakia) Czechoslovakia; Ivan Andreadis; Max Marinko; Ladislav Štípek; František Tokár; Bohumil Váňa	(France) France; Guy Amouretti; Maurice Bordrez; Charles Dubouillé; Michel Haguenauer; Eugène Manchiska	(United States) United States; Dick Miles; Garrett Nash; William Price; Marty Reisman
1949	Stockholm	(Hungary) Hungary; József Kóczián; Ferenc Sidó; Ferenc Soos; László Várkonyi	(Czechoslovakia) Czechoslovakia; Ivan Andreadis; Max Marinko; Ladislav Štípek; František Tokár; Bohumil Váňa	(England) England; Viktor Barna; Richard Bergmann; Johnny Leach; Ronald Sharman; Aubrey Simons
1949	Stockholm	(Hungary) Hungary; József Kóczián; Ferenc Sidó; Ferenc Soos; László Várkonyi	(Czechoslovakia) Czechoslovakia; Ivan Andreadis; Max Marinko; Ladislav Štípek; František Tokár; Bohumil Váňa	(United States) United States; Douglas Cartland; James McClure; Dick Miles; Marty Reisman
1950	Budapest	(Czechoslovakia) Czechoslovakia; Ivan Andreadis; Max Marinko; Václav Tereba; František Tokár; Bohumil Váňa	(Hungary) Hungary; József Farkas; József Kóczián; Ferenc Sidó; Ferenc Soos; László Várkonyi	(England) England; Richard Bergmann; Bernard Crouch; Johnny Leach; Aubrey Simons; Harry Venner
1950	Budapest	(Czechoslovakia) Czechoslovakia; Ivan Andreadis; Max Marinko; Václav Tereba; František Tokár; Bohumil Váňa	(Hungary) Hungary; József Farkas; József Kóczián; Ferenc Sidó; Ferenc Soos; László Várkonyi	(France) France; Alex Agopoff; Michel Haguenauer; Michel Lanskoy; René Roothooft
1951	Vienna	(Czechoslovakia) Czechoslovakia; Ivan Andreadis; Ladislav Štípek; Václav Tereba; František Tokár; Bohumil Váňa	(Hungary) Hungary; Jozsef Farkas; Elemér Gyetvai; József Kóczián; Ferenc Sidó; Kálmán Szepesi	(Socialist Federal Republic of Yugoslavia) Yugoslavia; Žarko Dolinar; Josip Gabric; Vilim Harangozo; Zdenko Uzorinac; Josip Vogrinc
1952	Bombay	(Hungary) Hungary; Elemér Gyetvai; József Kóczián; Ferenc Sidó; Kálmán Szepesi; László Várkonyi	(England) England; Richard Bergmann; Adrian Haydon; Johnny Leach; Aubrey Simons; Harry Venner	(Hong Kong) Hong Kong; Cheng Kwok Wing; Chung Chin Sing; Fu Chi Fong; Keung Wing Ning; Suh Sui Cho
1952	Bombay	(Hungary) Hungary; Elemér Gyetvai; József Kóczián; Ferenc Sidó; Kálmán Szepesi; László Várkonyi	(England) England; Richard Bergmann; Adrian Haydon; Johnny Leach; Aubrey Simons; Harry Venner	(Japan) Japan; Daisuke Daimon; Norikazu Fujii; Tadaaki Hayashi; Hiroji Satoh
1953	Bucharest	(England) England; Richard Bergmann; Adrian Haydon; Brian Kennedy; Johnny Leach; Aubrey Simons	(Hungary) Hungary; Elemér Gyetvai; József Kóczián; Miklós Sebők; Ferenc Sidó; Kálmán Szepesi	(Czechoslovakia) Czechoslovakia; Ivan Andreadis; Václav Tereba; František Tokár; Bohumil Váňa; Ludvík Vyhnanovský
1953	Bucharest	(England) England; Richard Bergmann; Adrian Haydon; Brian Kennedy; Johnny Leach; Aubrey Simons	(Hungary) Hungary; Elemér Gyetvai; József Kóczián; Miklós Sebők; Ferenc Sidó; Kálmán Szepesi	(France) France; Guy Amouretti; Michel Haguenauer; Michel Lanskoy; René Roothooft; Jean-Claude Sala
1954	Wembley	(Japan) Japan; Kazuo Kawai; Ichiro Ogimura; Kichiji Tamasu; Yoshio Tomita	(Czechoslovakia) Czechoslovakia; Ivan Andreadis; Josef Posejpal; Adolf Šlár; Ladislav Štípek; Václav Tereba	(England) England; Richard Bergmann; Kenneth Craigie; Johnny Leach; Aubrey Simons; Harry Venner
1955	Utrecht	(Japan) Japan; Ichiro Ogimura; Kichiji Tamasu; Toshiaki Tanaka; Yoshio Tomita	(Czechoslovakia) Czechoslovakia; Ivan Andreadis; Ladislav Štípek; Václav Tereba; Bohumil Váňa; Ludvík Vyhnanovský	(England) England; Richard Bergmann; Brian Kennedy; Johnny Leach; Bryan Merrett; Alan Rhodes
1955	Utrecht	(Japan) Japan; Ichiro Ogimura; Kichiji Tamasu; Toshiaki Tanaka; Yoshio Tomita	(Czechoslovakia) Czechoslovakia; Ivan Andreadis; Ladislav Štípek; Václav Tereba; Bohumil Váňa; Ludvík Vyhnanovský	(Hungary) Hungary; László Földy; József Kóczián; Ferenc Sidó; Josef Somogyi; Kálmán Szepesi
1956	Tokyo	(Japan) Japan; Ichiro Ogimura; Toshiaki Tanaka; Yoshio Tomita; Keisuke Tsunoda	(Czechoslovakia) Czechoslovakia; Ivan Andreadis; Ladislav Štípek; Václav Tereba; Ludvík Vyhnanovský	(China) China; Cen Huaiguang; Hu Bingquan; Jiang Yongning; Wang Chuanyao; Yang Ruihua
1956	Tokyo	(Japan) Japan; Ichiro Ogimura; Toshiaki Tanaka; Yoshio Tomita; Keisuke Tsunoda	(Czechoslovakia) Czechoslovakia; Ivan Andreadis; Ladislav Štípek; Václav Tereba; Ludvík Vyhnanovský	(Romania) Romania; Matei Gantner; Tiberiu Harasztosi; Paul Pesch; Mircea Popescu; Toma Reiter
1957	Stockholm	(Japan) Japan; Toshihiko Miyata; Ichiro Ogimura; Toshiaki Tanaka; Keisuke Tsunoda	(Hungary) Hungary; Zoltán Berczik; László Földy; Elemér Gyetvai; Miklós Péterfy; Ferenc Sidó	(China) China; Fu Qifang; Hu Bingquan; Jiang Yongning; Wang Chuanyao; Zhuang Jiafu
1957	Stockholm	(Japan) Japan; Toshihiko Miyata; Ichiro Ogimura; Toshiaki Tanaka; Keisuke Tsunoda	(Hungary) Hungary; Zoltán Berczik; László Földy; Elemér Gyetvai; Miklós Péterfy; Ferenc Sidó	(Czechoslovakia) Czechoslovakia; Ivan Andreadis; Ladislav Štípek; Václav Tereba; František Tokár; Ludvík Vyhnanovský
1959	Dortmund	(Japan) Japan; Nobuya Hoshino; Teruo Murakami; Seiji Narita; Ichiro Ogimura	(Hungary) Hungary; Zoltán Berczik; Zoltán Bubonyi; László Földy; László Pigniczki; Ferenc Sidó	(China) China; Jiang Yongning; Rong Guotuan; Wang Chuanyao; Xu Yinsheng; Yang Ruihua
1959	Dortmund	(Japan) Japan; Nobuya Hoshino; Teruo Murakami; Seiji Narita; Ichiro Ogimura	(Hungary) Hungary; Zoltán Berczik; Zoltán Bubonyi; László Földy; László Pigniczki; Ferenc Sidó	(South Vietnam) South Vietnam; Lê Văn Tiết; Mai Văn Hòa; Trần Cảnh Được; Trần Văn Liễu
1961	Beijing	(China) China; Li Furong; Rong Guotuan; Wang Chuanyao; Xu Yinsheng; Zhuang Zedong	(Japan) Japan; Nobuya Hoshino; Koji Kimura; Teruo Murakami; Ichiro Ogimura; Goro Shibutani	(Hungary) Hungary; Zoltán Berczik; László Földy; Miklós Péterfy; Péter Rózsás; Ferenc Sidó
1963	Prague	(China) China; Li Furong; Wang Jiasheng; Xu Yinsheng; Zhang Xielin; Zhuang Zedong	(Japan) Japan; Koji Kimura; Ken Konaka; Keiichi Miki; Ichiro Ogimura	(Sweden) Sweden; Hans Alsér; Stellan Bengtsson; Carl-Johan Bernhardt; Kjell Johansson
1963	Prague	(China) China; Li Furong; Wang Jiasheng; Xu Yinsheng; Zhang Xielin; Zhuang Zedong	(Japan) Japan; Koji Kimura; Ken Konaka; Keiichi Miki; Ichiro Ogimura	(West Germany) West Germany; Erich Arndt; Ernst Gomolla; Dieter Michalek; Eberhard Schöler; Elmar Stegmann
1965	Ljubljana	(China) China; Li Furong; Xu Yinsheng; Zhang Xielin; Zhou Lansun; Zhuang Zedong	(Japan) Japan; Koji Kimura; Ken Konaka; Takao Nohira; Ichiro Ogimura; Hiroshi Takahashi	(North Korea) North Korea; Jung Kil-hwa; Jung Ryang-woong; Kim Chang-ho; Kim Jung-sam; Pak Sin-il
1967	Stockholm	(Japan) Japan; Nobuhiko Hasegawa; Hajime Kagimoto; Satoru Kawahara; Koji Kimura; Mitsuru Kono	(North Korea) North Korea; Jung Ryang-woong; Kang Neung-hwa; Kim Chang-ho; Kim Jung-sam; Pak Sin-il	(Sweden) Sweden; Hans Alsér; Carl-Johan Bernhardt; Christer Johansson; Kjell Johansson; Bo Persson
1969	Munich	(Japan) Japan; Nobuhiko Hasegawa; Tetsuo Inoue; Shigeo Itoh; Kenji Kasai; Mitsuru Kono	(West Germany) West Germany; Bernt Jansen; Wilfried Lieck; Martin Ness; Eberhard Schöler	(Socialist Federal Republic of Yugoslavia) Yugoslavia; Zlatko Cordas; Istvan Korpa; Antun Stipančić; Dragutin Šurbek; Edvard Vecko
1971	Nagoya	(China) China; Li Furong; Li Jingguang; Liang Geliang; Xi Enting; Zhuang Zedong	(Japan) Japan; Nobuhiko Hasegawa; Tetsuo Inoue; Shigeo Itoh; Mitsuru Kono; Tokio Tasaka	(Socialist Federal Republic of Yugoslavia) Yugoslavia; Zlatko Cordas; Milivoj Karakašević; Istvan Korpa; Antun Stipančić; Dragutin Šurbek
1973	Sarajevo	(Sweden) Sweden; Stellan Bengtsson; Anders Johansson; Kjell Johansson; Bo Persson; Ingemar Wikström	(China) China; Diao Wenyuan; Li Jingguang; Liang Geliang; Xi Enting; Xu Shaofa	(Japan) Japan; Nobuhiko Hasegawa; Yujiro Imano; Mitsuru Kono; Norio Takashima; Tokio Tasaka
1975	Calcutta	(China) China; Li Peng; Li Zhenshi; Liang Geliang; Lu Yuansheng; Xu Shaofa	(Socialist Federal Republic of Yugoslavia) Yugoslavia; Milivoj Karakašević; Zoran Kosanović; Miran Savnić; Antun Stipančić; Dragutin Šurbek	(Sweden) Sweden; Stellan Bengtsson; Kjell Johansson; Bo Persson; Ulf Thorsell; Ingemar Wikström
1977	Birmingham	(China) China; Guo Yuehua; Huang Liang; Li Zhenshi; Liang Geliang; Wang Jun	(Japan) Japan; Tetsuo Inoue; Mitsuru Kono; Masahiro Maehara; Norio Takashima; Tokio Tasaka	(Sweden) Sweden; Stellan Bengtsson; Åke Grönlund; Kjell Johansson; Roger Lagerfeldt; Ulf Thorsell
1979	Pyongyang	(Hungary) Hungary; Gábor Gergely; István Jónyer; Tibor Klampár; Tibor Kreisz; János Takács	(China) China; Guo Yuehua; Huang Liang; Li Zhenshi; Liang Geliang; Lu Qiwei	(Japan) Japan; Hiroyuki Abe; Hideo Gotoh; Masahiro Maehara; Seiji Ono; Norio Takashima
1981	Novi Sad	(China) China; Cai Zhenhua; Guo Yuehua; Shi Zhihao; Wang Huiyuan; Xie Saike	(Hungary) Hungary; Gábor Gergely; István Jónyer; Tibor Klampár; Tibor Kreisz; Zsolt Kriston	(Japan) Japan; Hiroyuki Abe; Hideo Gotoh; Masahiro Maehara; Seiji Ono; Norio Takashima
1983	Tokyo	(China) China; Cai Zhenhua; Fan Changmao; Guo Yuehua; Jiang Jialiang; Xie Saike	(Sweden) Sweden; Mikael Appelgren; Stellan Bengtsson; Ulf Bengtsson; Erik Lindh; Jan-Ove Waldner	(Hungary) Hungary; Gábor Gergely; István Jónyer; Zoltán Káposztás; Zsolt Kriston; János Molnár
1985	Gothenburg	(China) China; Chen Longcan; Chen Xinhua; Jiang Jialiang; Wang Huiyuan; Xie Saike	(Sweden) Sweden; Mikael Appelgren; Ulf Bengtsson; Ulf Carlsson; Erik Lindh; Jan-Ove Waldner	(Poland) Poland; Stefan Dryszel; Andrzej Grubba; Andrzej Jakubowicz; Leszek Kucharski; Norbert Mnich
1987	New Delhi	(China) China; Chen Longcan; Chen Xinhua; Jiang Jialiang; Teng Yi; Wang Hao (born 1966)	(Sweden) Sweden; Mikael Appelgren; Ulf Carlsson; Erik Lindh; Jörgen Persson; Jan-Ove Waldner	(North Korea) North Korea; Chu Jong-chol; Hong Chol; Hong Sun; Kim Song-hui; Ri Gun-sang
1989	Dortmund	(Sweden) Sweden; Mikael Appelgren; Peter Karlsson; Erik Lindh; Jörgen Persson; Jan-Ove Waldner	(China) China; Chen Longcan; Jiang Jialiang; Ma Wenge; Teng Yi; Yu Shentong	(North Korea) North Korea; Chu Jong-chol; Kim Song-hui; Ri Gun-sang; Yun Mun-song
1991	Chiba City	(Sweden) Sweden; Mikael Appelgren; Peter Karlsson; Erik Lindh; Jörgen Persson; Jan-Ove Waldner	(Socialist Federal Republic of Yugoslavia) Yugoslavia; Zoran Kalinić; Ilija Lupulesku; Zoran Primorac; Robert Smrekar	(Czechoslovakia) Czechoslovakia; Milan Grman; Tomáš Jančí; Petr Javůrek; Petr Korbel; Roland Vími
1993	Gothenburg	(Sweden) Sweden; Mikael Appelgren; Peter Karlsson; Erik Lindh; Jörgen Persson; Jan-Ove Waldner	(China) China; Liu Guoliang; Lü Lin; Ma Wenge; Wang Hao (born 1966); Wang Tao; Zhang Lei	(Germany) Germany; Oliver Alke; Steffen Fetzner; Peter Franz; Richard Prause; Jörg Roßkopf
1995	Tianjin	(China) China; Ding Song; Kong Linghui; Liu Guoliang; Ma Wenge; Wang Tao	(Sweden) Sweden; Mikael Appelgren; Peter Karlsson; Erik Lindh; Jörgen Persson; Jan-Ove Waldner	(South Korea) South Korea; Chu Kyo-sung; Kim Bong-chul; Kim Taek-soo; Lee Chul-seung; Yoo Nam-kyu
1997	Manchester	(China) China; Ding Song; Kong Linghui; Liu Guoliang; Ma Wenge; Wang Tao	(France) France; Nicolas Chatelain; Patrick Chila; Damien Éloi; Jean-Philippe Gatien; Christophe Legoût	(South Korea) South Korea; Chu Kyo-sung; Kim Taek-soo; Lee Chul-seung; Oh Sang-eun; Yoo Nam-kyu
2000	Kuala Lumpur	(Sweden) Sweden; Fredrik Håkansson; Peter Karlsson; Jörgen Persson; Jan-Ove Waldner	(China) China; Kong Linghui; Liu Guoliang; Liu Guozheng; Ma Lin; Wang Liqin	(Italy) Italy; Umberto Giardina; Massimiliano Mondello; Valentino Piacentini; Yang Min
2000	Kuala Lumpur	(Sweden) Sweden; Fredrik Håkansson; Peter Karlsson; Jörgen Persson; Jan-Ove Waldner	(China) China; Kong Linghui; Liu Guoliang; Liu Guozheng; Ma Lin; Wang Liqin	(Japan) Japan; Seiko Iseki; Kōji Matsushita; Hiroshi Shibutani; Toshio Tasaki; Ryo Yuzawa
2001	Osaka	(China) China; Kong Linghui; Liu Guoliang; Liu Guozheng; Ma Lin; Wang Liqin	(Belgium) Belgium; Martin Bratanov; Marc Closset; Andras Podpinka; Jean-Michel Saive; Philippe Saive	(South Korea) South Korea; Joo Se-hyuk; Kim Taek-soo; Lee Chul-seung; Oh Sang-eun; Ryu Seung-min
2001	Osaka	(China) China; Kong Linghui; Liu Guoliang; Liu Guozheng; Ma Lin; Wang Liqin	(Belgium) Belgium; Martin Bratanov; Marc Closset; Andras Podpinka; Jean-Michel Saive; Philippe Saive	(Sweden) Sweden; Fredrik Håkansson; Peter Karlsson; Magnus Molin; Jörgen Persson; Jan-Ove Waldner
2004	Doha	(China) China; Kong Linghui; Liu Guozheng; Ma Lin; Wang Hao (born 1983); Wang Liqin	(Germany) Germany; Timo Boll; Zoltan Fejer-Konnerth; Jörg Roßkopf; Torben Wosik; Christian Süß	(South Korea) South Korea; Joo Se-hyuk; Kim Jung-hoon; Kim Taek-soo; Oh Sang-eun; Ryu Seung-min
2006	Bremen	(China) China; Chen Qi; Ma Lin; Ma Long; Wang Hao (born 1983); Wang Liqin	(South Korea) South Korea; Joo Se-hyuk; Lee Jung-woo; Lim Jae-hyun; Oh Sang-eun; Ryu Seung-min	(Germany) Germany; Timo Boll; Zoltan Fejer-Konnerth; Jörg Roßkopf; Bastian Steger; Christian Süß
2006	Bremen	(China) China; Chen Qi; Ma Lin; Ma Long; Wang Hao (born 1983); Wang Liqin	(South Korea) South Korea; Joo Se-hyuk; Lee Jung-woo; Lim Jae-hyun; Oh Sang-eun; Ryu Seung-min	(Hong Kong) Hong Kong; Cheung Yuk; Ko Lai Chak; Leung Chu Yan; Li Ching; Tse Ka Chun
2008	Guangzhou	(China) China; Chen Qi; Ma Lin; Ma Long; Wang Hao (born 1983); Wang Liqin	(South Korea) South Korea; Joo Se-hyuk; Kim Jung-hoon; Lee Jin-kwon; Lee Jung-woo; Ryu Seung-min	(Hong Kong) Hong Kong; Cheung Yuk; Ko Lai Chak; Leung Chu Yan; Li Ching; Tang Peng
2008	Guangzhou	(China) China; Chen Qi; Ma Lin; Ma Long; Wang Hao (born 1983); Wang Liqin	(South Korea) South Korea; Joo Se-hyuk; Kim Jung-hoon; Lee Jin-kwon; Lee Jung-woo; Ryu Seung-min	(Japan) Japan; Yo Kan; Seiya Kishikawa; Jun Mizutani; Hidetoshi Oya; Kaii Yoshida
2010	Moscow	(China) China; Ma Lin; Ma Long; Wang Hao (born 1983); Xu Xin; Zhang Jike	(Germany) Germany; Patrick Baum; Timo Boll; Dimitrij Ovtcharov; Bastian Steger; Christian Süß	(Japan) Japan; Kazuhiro Chan; Seiya Kishikawa; Kenta Matsudaira; Jun Mizutani; Kaii Yoshida
2010	Moscow	(China) China; Ma Lin; Ma Long; Wang Hao (born 1983); Xu Xin; Zhang Jike	(Germany) Germany; Patrick Baum; Timo Boll; Dimitrij Ovtcharov; Bastian Steger; Christian Süß	(South Korea) South Korea; Cho Eon-rae; Jeoung Young-sik; Joo Se-hyuk; Oh Sang-eun; Ryu Seung-min
2012	Dortmund	(China) China; Ma Lin; Ma Long; Wang Hao (born 1983); Xu Xin; Zhang Jike	(Germany) Germany; Patrick Baum; Timo Boll; Dimitrij Ovtcharov; Bastian Steger; Christian Süß	(Japan) Japan; Seiya Kishikawa; Kenji Matsudaira; Jun Mizutani; Koki Niwa; Maharu Yoshimura
2012	Dortmund	(China) China; Ma Lin; Ma Long; Wang Hao (born 1983); Xu Xin; Zhang Jike	(Germany) Germany; Patrick Baum; Timo Boll; Dimitrij Ovtcharov; Bastian Steger; Christian Süß	(South Korea) South Korea; Jeoung Young-sik; Joo Se-hyuk; Kim Min-seok; Oh Sang-eun; Ryu Seung-min
2014	Tokyo	(China) China; Fan Zhendong; Ma Long; Wang Hao (born 1983); Xu Xin; Zhang Jike	(Germany) Germany; Timo Boll; Patrick Franziska; Steffen Mengel; Dimitrij Ovtcharov	(Chinese Taipei) Chinese Taipei; Chen Chien-an; Chiang Hung-chieh; Chuang Chih-yuan; Huang Sheng-sheng; Wu Chih-chi
2014	Tokyo	(China) China; Fan Zhendong; Ma Long; Wang Hao (born 1983); Xu Xin; Zhang Jike	(Germany) Germany; Timo Boll; Patrick Franziska; Steffen Mengel; Dimitrij Ovtcharov	(Japan) Japan; Seiya Kishikawa; Kenta Matsudaira; Jun Mizutani; Koki Niwa; Masato Shiono
2016	Kuala Lumpur	(China) China; Fan Zhendong; Fang Bo; Ma Long; Xu Xin; Zhang Jike	(Japan) Japan; Kenta Matsudaira; Jun Mizutani; Koki Niwa; Yuya Oshima; Maharu Yoshimura	(England) England; Alan Cooke; Paul Drinkhall; Liam Pitchford; Sam Walker
2016	Kuala Lumpur	(China) China; Fan Zhendong; Fang Bo; Ma Long; Xu Xin; Zhang Jike	(Japan) Japan; Kenta Matsudaira; Jun Mizutani; Koki Niwa; Yuya Oshima; Maharu Yoshimura	(South Korea) South Korea; Jang Woo-jin; Jeong Sang-eun; Jeoung Young-sik; Joo Sae-hyuk; Lee Sang-su
2018	Halmstad	(China) China; Fan Zhendong; Lin Gaoyuan; Ma Long; Wang Chuqin; Xu Xin	(Germany) Germany; Timo Boll; Ruwen Filus; Patrick Franziska; Dimitrij Ovtcharov; Bastian Steger	(South Korea) South Korea; Jang Woo-jin; Jeoung Young-sik; Kim Dong-hyun; Lee Sang-su; Lim Jong-hoon
2018	Halmstad	(China) China; Fan Zhendong; Lin Gaoyuan; Ma Long; Wang Chuqin; Xu Xin	(Germany) Germany; Timo Boll; Ruwen Filus; Patrick Franziska; Dimitrij Ovtcharov; Bastian Steger	(Sweden) Sweden; Anton Källberg; Kristian Karlsson; Mattias Karlsson; Truls Möregårdh; Jon Persson
2022	Chengdu	China; Fan Zhendong; Liang Jingkun; Lin Gaoyuan; Ma Long; Wang Chuqin	Germany; Benedikt Duda; Fanbo Meng; Dang Qiu; Kay Stumper; Ricardo Walther	(Japan) Japan; Tomokazu Harimoto; Mizuki Oikawa; Shunsuke Togami; Jo Yokotani
2022	Chengdu	China; Fan Zhendong; Liang Jingkun; Lin Gaoyuan; Ma Long; Wang Chuqin	Germany; Benedikt Duda; Fanbo Meng; Dang Qiu; Kay Stumper; Ricardo Walther	(South Korea) South Korea; An Jae-hyun; Cho Dae-seong; Cho Seung-min; Hwang Min-ha; Jang Woo-jin
2024	Busan	China; Fan Zhendong; Liang Jingkun; Lin Gaoyuan; Ma Long; Wang Chuqin	France; Lilian Bardet; Simon Gauzy; Alexis Lebrun; Félix Lebrun; Jules Rolland	(Chinese Taipei) Chinese Taipei; Chuang Chih-yuan; Feng Yi-hsin; Huang Yan-cheng; Kao Cheng-jui; Lin Yun-ju
2024	Busan	China; Fan Zhendong; Liang Jingkun; Lin Gaoyuan; Ma Long; Wang Chuqin	France; Lilian Bardet; Simon Gauzy; Alexis Lebrun; Félix Lebrun; Jules Rolland	(South Korea) South Korea; An Jae-hyun; Jang Woo-jin; Lee Sang-su; Lim Jong-hoon; Park Gyu-hyeon
2026	London	(China) China; Liang Jingkun; Lin Shidong; Wang Chuqin; Xiang Peng; Zhou Qihao	(Japan) Japan; Tomokazu Harimoto; Sora Matsushima; Hiroto Shinozuka; Shunsuke Togami; Yukiya Uda	(Chinese Taipei) Chinese Taipei; Feng Yi-hsin; Hsu Hsien-chia; Hung Jing-kai; Kuo Guan-hong; Lin Yun-ju
2026	London	(China) China; Liang Jingkun; Lin Shidong; Wang Chuqin; Xiang Peng; Zhou Qihao	(Japan) Japan; Tomokazu Harimoto; Sora Matsushima; Hiroto Shinozuka; Shunsuke Togami; Yukiya Uda	(France) France; Flavien Coton; Simon Gauzy; Alexis Lebrun; Félix Lebrun; Thibault Poret

==== Performance by nations in men's team ====
Team	Winners	Runners-up	Third place
China	24 (1961, '63, '65, '71, '75, '77, '81, '83, '85, '87, '95, '97, 2001, '04, '06, '08, '10, '12, '14, '16, '18, '22, '24, '26)	5 (1973, '79, '89, '93, 2000)	3 (1956, '57, '59)
Hungary	12 (1926, '28, '29, '30, '31, '33x2, '35, '38, '49, '52, '79)	8 (1932, '37, '50, '51, '53, 57, '59, '81)	4 (1936, '55, '61, '83)
Japan	7 (1954, '55, '56, '57, '59, '67, '69)	7 (1961, '63, '65, '71, '77, 2016, '26)	10 (1952, '73, '79, '81, 2000, '08, '10, '12, '14, '22)
Czechoslovakia	6 (1932, '39, '47, '48, '50, '51)	8 (1931, '33x2, '35, '49, '54, '55, '56)	7 (1930, '36, '37, '38, '53, '57, '91)
Sweden	5 (1973, '89, '91, '93, 2000)	5 (1930, '83, '85, '87, '95)	6 (1963, '67, '75, '77, 2001, '18)
Austria	1 (1936)	5 (1926, '28, '29, '33, '38)	5 (1932, '33, '35, '47, '48)
England	1 (1953)	2 (1931, '52)	10 (1926, '28, '29, '33, '39, '49, '50, '54, '55, 2016)
United States	1 (1937)	1 (1947)	3 (1938, '48, '49)
Germany	0	6 (2004, '10, '12, '14, '18, '22)	2 (1993, 2006)
France	0	3 (1948, '97, 2024)	5 (1936, '47, '50, '53, 2026)
Yugoslavia	0	3 (1939, '75, '91)	3 (1951, '69, '71)
South Korea	0	2 (2006, '08)	10 (1995, '97, 2001, '04, '10, '12, '16, '18, '22, '24)
North Korea	0	1 (1967)	3 (1965, '87, '89)
Romania	0	1 (1936)	1 (1956)
West Germany	0	1 (1969)	1 (1963)
Belgium	0	1 (2001)	0
Poland	0	0	3 (1935, '36, '85)
Hong Kong	0	0	3 (1952, 2006, '08)
Chinese Taipei	0	0	3 (2014, '24, '26)
India	0	0	1 (1926)
Vietnam	0	0	1 (1959)
Italy	0	0	1 (2000)

=== Women's team ===
Year	Host City	Gold	Silver	Bronze
1934	Paris	(Nazi Germany) Germany; Anita Felguth; Annemarie Haensch; Astrid Krebsbach; Mona Müller-Rüster	(Kingdom of Hungary) Hungary; Magda Gál; Mária Mednyánszky; Anna Sipos	(Czechoslovakia) Czechoslovakia; Marie Kettnerová; Marie Šmídová; Jozka Veselska
1935	Wembley	(Czechoslovakia) Czechoslovakia; Marie Kettnerová; Gertrude Kleinová; Marie Šmídová	(Kingdom of Hungary) Hungary; Magda Gál; Mária Mednyánszky; Anna Sipos	(Nazi Germany) Germany; Hilde Bussmann; Anita Felguth; Astrid Krebsbach
1936	Prague	(Czechoslovakia) Czechoslovakia; Marie Kettnerová; Gertrude Kleinová; Marie Šmídová; Věra Votrubcová	(Nazi Germany) Germany; Hilde Bussmann; Anita Felguth; Astrid Krebsbach (United States) United States; Ruth Aarons; Corinne Migneco; Jessie Purves	Not awarded, as there was a tie for silver.
1937	Baden bei Wien	(United States) United States; Ruth Aarons; Emily Fuller; Dolores Kuenz; Jessie Purves	(Nazi Germany) Germany; Hilde Bussmann; Astrid Hobohm-Krebsbach; Annemarie Schulz	(Czechoslovakia) Czechoslovakia; Vlasta Depetrisová; Marie Kettnerová; Podhajecka; Věra Votrubcová
1938	Wembley	(Czechoslovakia) Czechoslovakia; Vlasta Depetrisová; Jindriska Holubkova; Marie Kettnerová; Věra Votrubcová	(England) England; Dora Emdin; Phyllis Hodgkinson; Doris Jordan; Margaret Osborne	(Austria) Austria; Zita Lemo; Gertrude Pritzi
1939	Cairo	(Nazi Germany) Germany; Hilde Bussmann; Gertrude Pritzi	(Czechoslovakia) Czechoslovakia; Vlasta Depetrisová; Marie Kettnerová; Věra Votrubcová	(Romania) Romania; Angelica Adelstein; Sari Kolozsvári
1947	Paris	(England) England; Elizabeth Blackbourn; Vera Dace; Margaret Franks; Margaret Osborne-Knott	(Hungary) Hungary; Éva Anderlik; Gizella Farkas; Rozsi Karpati; Béláné Vermes	(Czechoslovakia) Czechoslovakia; Vlasta Depetrisová; Eliška Fürstová; Marie Kettnerová; Věra Votrubcová
1947	Paris	(England) England; Elizabeth Blackbourn; Vera Dace; Margaret Franks; Margaret Osborne-Knott	(Hungary) Hungary; Éva Anderlik; Gizella Farkas; Rozsi Karpati; Béláné Vermes	(United States) United States; Mae Clouther; Davida Hawthorn; Reba Monness; Leah Thall
1948	Wembley	(England) England; Dora Beregi; Margaret Franks; Elizabeth Steventon; Vera Thomas	(Hungary) Hungary; Gizella Farkas; Loretta Gyorgy; Rozsi Karpati	(Czechoslovakia) Czechoslovakia; Eliška Fürstová; Marie Kettnerová; Vlasta Depetrisová-Pokorna; Marie Zelenková
1948	Wembley	(England) England; Dora Beregi; Margaret Franks; Elizabeth Steventon; Vera Thomas	(Hungary) Hungary; Gizella Farkas; Loretta Gyorgy; Rozsi Karpati	(Romania) Romania; G Beca; Sari Kolozsvári; Despina Mavrocordat; Angelica Rozeanu
1949	Stockholm	(United States) United States; Peggy McLean; Mildred Shahian; Thelma Thall	(England) England; Pinkie Barnes; Joan Crosby; Margaret Franks; Adele Wood	(France) France; Huguette Béolet; Jeanne Delay; Yolande Vannoni
1949	Stockholm	(United States) United States; Peggy McLean; Mildred Shahian; Thelma Thall	(England) England; Pinkie Barnes; Joan Crosby; Margaret Franks; Adele Wood	(Hungary) Hungary; Gizella Farkas; Rozsi Karpati; Erzsébet Mezei
1950	Budapest	(Romania) Romania; Sari Kolozsvári; Angelica Rozeanu; Luci Slavescu	(Hungary) Hungary; Gizella Farkas; Rozsi Karpati; Ilona Király; Ilona Solyom	(England) England; Pinkie Barnes; Dora Devenney; Margaret Franks; Vera Thomas
1950	Budapest	(Romania) Romania; Sari Kolozsvári; Angelica Rozeanu; Luci Slavescu	(Hungary) Hungary; Gizella Farkas; Rozsi Karpati; Ilona Király; Ilona Solyom	(Czechoslovakia) Czechoslovakia; Eliška Fürstová; Květa Hrušková; Marie Kettnerová; Ida Koťátková
1951	Vienna	(Romania) Romania; Paraschiva Patulea; Angelica Rozeanu; Sari Szasz; Ella Zeller	(Austria) Austria; Gertrude Pritzi; Ermelinde Wertl; Gertrude Wutzl	(England) England; Margaret Franks; Joyce Roberts; Diane Rowe; Rosalind Rowe
1951	Vienna	(Romania) Romania; Paraschiva Patulea; Angelica Rozeanu; Sari Szasz; Ella Zeller	(Austria) Austria; Gertrude Pritzi; Ermelinde Wertl; Gertrude Wutzl	(Wales) Wales; Audrey Bates; Audrey Coombs; Betty Gray
1952	Bombay	(Japan) Japan; Shizuka Narahara; Tomie Nishimura	(Romania) Romania; Angelica Rozeanu; Sari Szasz; Ella Zeller	(England) England; Kathleen Best; Margaret Franks; Diane Rowe; Rosalind Rowe
1953	Bucharest	(Romania) Romania; Angelica Rozeanu; Sari Szasz; Ella Zeller	(England) England; Kathleen Best; Diane Rowe; Rosalind Rowe	(Austria) Austria; Friederike Lauber; Gertrude Pritzi; Ermelinde Wertl
1953	Bucharest	(Romania) Romania; Angelica Rozeanu; Sari Szasz; Ella Zeller	(England) England; Kathleen Best; Diane Rowe; Rosalind Rowe	(Hungary) Hungary; Zsuzsa Fantusz; Gizella Gervai; Éva Kóczián; Agnes Simon
1954	Wembley	(Japan) Japan; Fujie Eguchi; Hideko Goto; Yoshiko Tanaka; Kiiko Watanabe	(Hungary) Hungary; Gizella Gervai; Ilona Kerekes; Éva Kóczián; Agnes Simon	(England) England; Kathleen Best; Ann Haydon; Diane Rowe; Rosalind Rowe
1955	Utrecht	(Romania) Romania; Angelica Rozeanu; Sari Szasz; Ella Zeller	(Japan) Japan; Fujie Eguchi; Shizuka Narahara; Yoshiko Tanaka; Kiiko Watanabe	(England) England; Ann Haydon; Diane Rowe; Rosalind Rowe; Jean Winn
1956	Tokyo	(Romania) Romania; Angelica Rozeanu; Ella Zeller	(England) England; Ann Haydon; Jill Rook; Diane Rowe	(Japan) Japan; Fujie Eguchi; Tomi Okawa; Yoshiko Tanaka; Kiiko Watanabe
1957	Stockholm	(Japan) Japan; Fujie Eguchi; Taeko Namba; Tomi Okawa; Kiiko Watanabe	(Romania) Romania; Maria Golopenta; Angelica Rozeanu; Ella Zeller	(China) China; Qiu Zhonghui; Sun Meiying; Ye Peiqiong
1959	Dortmund	(Japan) Japan; Fujie Eguchi; Kimiyo Matsuzaki; Taeko Namba; Kazuko Yamaizumi	(South Korea) South Korea; Cho Kyung-ja; Choi Kyung-ja; Hwang Yool-ja; Lee Chong-hi	(China) China; Qiu Zhonghui; Sun Meiying; Ye Peiqiong
1961	Beijing	(Japan) Japan; Kazuko Ito-Yamaizumi; Kimiyo Matsuzaki; Tomi Okawa; Masako Seki	(China) China; Han Yuzhen; Hu Keming; Qiu Zhonghui; Sun Meiying	(Romania) Romania; Maria Alexandru; Maria Catrinel Folea; Georgeta Pitică
1963	Prague	(Japan) Japan; Kazuko Ito-Yamaizumi; Kimiyo Matsuzaki; Masako Seki; Noriko Yamanaka	(Romania) Romania; Maria Alexandru; Ella Constantinescu; Maria Catrinel Folea; Georgeta Pitică	(China) China; Liang Lizhen; Qiu Zhonghui; Sun Meiying; Wang Jian
1963	Prague	(Japan) Japan; Kazuko Ito-Yamaizumi; Kimiyo Matsuzaki; Masako Seki; Noriko Yamanaka	(Romania) Romania; Maria Alexandru; Ella Constantinescu; Maria Catrinel Folea; Georgeta Pitică	(Hungary) Hungary; Éva Kóczián-Földy; Erzsebet Heirits; Sarolta Lukacs; Eva Poor
1965	Ljubljana	(China) China; Li Henan; Liang Lizhen; Lin Huiqing; Zheng Minzhi	(Japan) Japan; Naoko Fukatsu; Tsunao Isomura; Masako Seki; Noriko Yamanaka	(England) England; Lesley Bell; Irene Ogus; Diane Rowe; Mary Shannon
1967	Stockholm	(Japan) Japan; Naoko Fukatsu; Saeko Hirota; Sachiko Morisawa; Noriko Yamanaka	(Soviet Union) Soviet Union; Laima Balaišytė; Svetlana Grinberg; Signe Paisjärv; Zoja Rudnova	(Hungary) Hungary; Erzsebet Jurik; Beatrix Kisházi; Éva Kóczián; Sarolta Lukacs
1969	Munich	(Soviet Union) Soviet Union; Laima Amelina; Svetlana Grinberg; Rita Pogosova; Zoja Rudnova	(Romania) Romania; Maria Alexandru; Carmen Crișan; Eleonora Mihalca	(Japan) Japan; Saeko Hirota; Yasuko Konno; Toshiko Kowada; Sachiko Morisawa
1971	Nagoya	(Japan) Japan; Yasuko Konno; Toshiko Kowada; Emiko Ohba; Yukie Ozeki	(China) China; Li Li; Lin Huiqing; Lin Meiqun; Zheng Minzhi	(South Korea) South Korea; Choi Jung-sook; Chung Hyun-sook; Lee Ailesa; Na In-sook
1973	Sarajevo	(South Korea) South Korea; Chung Hyun-sook; Kim Soon-ok; Lee Ailesa; Park Mi-ra	(China) China; Hu Yulan; Zhang Li; Zheng Huaiying; Zheng Minzhi	(Japan) Japan; Tomie Edano; Miho Hamada; Yukie Ohzeki; Sachiko Yokota
1975	Calcutta	(China) China; Ge Xin'ai; Hu Yulan; Zhang Li; Zheng Huaiying	(South Korea) South Korea; Chung Hyun-sook; Kim Soon-ok; Lee Ailesa; Sung Nak-so	(Japan) Japan; Tomie Edano; Yukie Ozeki; Shoko Takahashi; Sachiko Yokota
1977	Birmingham	(China) China; Ge Xin'ai; Zhang Deying; Zhang Li; Zhu Xiangyun	(South Korea) South Korea; Chung Hyun-sook; Kim Soon-ok; Lee Ailesa; Lee Ki-won	(North Korea) North Korea; Kim Chang-ae; Pak Yong-ok; Pak Yung-sun; Li Song-suk
1979	Pyongyang	(China) China; Cao Yanhua; Ge Xin'ai; Zhang Deying; Zhang Li	(North Korea) North Korea; Hong Gil-soon; Pak Yong-ok; Pak Yung-sun; Li Song-suk	(Japan) Japan; Kayoko Kawahigashi; Yoshiko Shimauchi; Kayo Sugaya; Shoko Takahashi
1981	Novi Sad	(China) China; Cao Yanhua; Qi Baoxiang; Tong Ling; Zhang Deying	(South Korea) South Korea; An Hae-sook; Hwang Nam-sook; Kim Kyung-ja; Lee Soo-ja	(North Korea) North Korea; Kim Gyong-sun; Pak Yung-sun; Li Song-suk
1983	Tokyo	(China) China; Cao Yanhua; Geng Lijuan; Ni Xialian; Tong Ling	(Japan) Japan; Mika Hoshino; Emiko Kanda; Fumiko Shinpo; Tomoko Tamura	(North Korea) North Korea; Chang Yong-ok; Kim Gyong-sun; Li Bun-hui; Li Song-suk
1985	Gothenburg	(China) China; Dai Lili; Geng Lijuan; He Zhili; Tong Ling	(North Korea) North Korea; Cho Jong-hui; Han Hye-song; Li Bun-hui; Pang Chun-dok	(South Korea) South Korea; Lee Soo-ja; Lee Sun; Yang Young-ja; Yoon Kyung-mi
1987	New Delhi	(China) China; Chen Jing; Dai Lili; Jiao Zhimin; Li Huifen	(South Korea) South Korea; Baek Soon-ae; Hong Soon-hwa; Hyun Jung-hwa; Yang Young-ja	(Hungary) Hungary; Csilla Bátorfi; Szilvia Káhn; Krisztina Nagy; Edit Urban
1989	Dortmund	(China) China; Chen Jing; Chen Zihe; Hu Xiaoxin; Li Huifen	(South Korea) South Korea; Hong Soon-hwa; Hyun Jung-hwa; Kim Young-mi; Kwon Mi-sook	(Hong Kong) Hong Kong; Chai Po Wa; Chan Tan Lui; Hui So Hung; Mok Ka Sha
1991	Chiba City	Korea; Hong Cha-ok; Hyun Jung-hwa; Li Bun-hui; Yu Sun-bok	(China) China; Chen Zihe; Deng Yaping; Gao Jun; Qiao Hong	(France) France; Emmanuelle Coubat; Sandrine Derrien; Xiaoming Wang-Dréchou; Agnès Le Lannic
1993	Gothenburg	(China) China; Chen Zihe; Deng Yaping; Gao Jun; Qiao Hong	(North Korea) North Korea; An Hui-suk; Li Bun-hui; Wi Bok-sun; Yu Sun-bok	(South Korea) South Korea; Hong Cha-ok; Hong Soon-hwa; Hyun Jung-hwa; Park Hae-jung
1995	Tianjin	(China) China; Deng Yaping; Liu Wei; Qiao Hong; Qiao Yunping	(South Korea) South Korea; Kim Moo-kyo; Park Hae-jung; Park Kyung-ae; Ryu Ji-hye	(Hong Kong) Hong Kong; Chai Po Wa; Chan Tan Lui; Tong Wun; Wan Shuk Kwan
1997	Manchester	(China) China; Deng Yaping; Li Ju; Wang Chen; Wang Nan; Yang Ying	(North Korea) North Korea; Kim Hyon-hui; Tu Jong-sil; Wi Bok-sun	(Germany) Germany; Christina Fischer; Olga Nemeș; Elke Schall; Jie Schöpp; Nicole Struse
2000	Kuala Lumpur	(China) China; Li Ju; Sun Jin; Wang Hui; Wang Nan; Zhang Yining	(Chinese Taipei) Chinese Taipei; Chen Jing; Lu Yun-feng; Pan Li-chun; Tsui Hsiu-li; Xu Jing	(Romania) Romania; Otilia Bădescu; Ana Gogorita; Antonela Manac; Mihaela Steff
2000	Kuala Lumpur	(China) China; Li Ju; Sun Jin; Wang Hui; Wang Nan; Zhang Yining	(Chinese Taipei) Chinese Taipei; Chen Jing; Lu Yun-feng; Pan Li-chun; Tsui Hsiu-li; Xu Jing	(South Korea) South Korea; Kim Moo-kyo; Lee Eun-sil; Park Hae-jung; Ryu Ji-hye; Seok Eun-mi
2001	Osaka	(China) China; Li Ju; Sun Jin; Wang Nan; Yang Ying; Zhang Yining	(North Korea) North Korea; Kim Hyang-mi; Kim Hyon-hui; Kim Mi-yong; Kim Yun-mi; Tu Jong-sil	(Japan) Japan; Junko Haneyoshi; An Konishi; Yuka Nishii; Keiko Okazaki; Yoshie Takada
2001	Osaka	(China) China; Li Ju; Sun Jin; Wang Nan; Yang Ying; Zhang Yining	(North Korea) North Korea; Kim Hyang-mi; Kim Hyon-hui; Kim Mi-yong; Kim Yun-mi; Tu Jong-sil	(South Korea) South Korea; Jun Hye-kyung; Kim Moo-kyo; Lee Eun-sil; Ryu Ji-hye; Seok Eun-mi
2004	Doha	(China) China; Guo Yue; Li Ju; Niu Jianfeng; Wang Nan; Zhang Yining	(Hong Kong) Hong Kong; Lau Sui Fei; Song Ah Sim; Tie Ya Na; Yu Kwok See; Zhang Rui	(Japan) Japan; Ai Fujinuma; Ai Fukuhara; Sayaka Hirano; Naoko Taniguchi; Aya Umemura
2006	Bremen	(China) China; Guo Yan; Guo Yue; Li Xiaoxia; Wang Nan; Zhang Yining	(Hong Kong) Hong Kong; Lau Sui Fei; Lin Ling; Tie Ya Na; Yu Kwok See; Zhang Rui	(Belarus) Belarus; Tatsiana Kostromina; Veronika Pavlovich; Viktoria Pavlovich; Aleksandra Privalova
2006	Bremen	(China) China; Guo Yan; Guo Yue; Li Xiaoxia; Wang Nan; Zhang Yining	(Hong Kong) Hong Kong; Lau Sui Fei; Lin Ling; Tie Ya Na; Yu Kwok See; Zhang Rui	(Japan) Japan; Ai Fujinuma; Ai Fukuhara; Haruna Fukuoka; Sayaka Hirano; Saki Kanazawa
2008	Guangzhou	(China) China; Guo Yan; Guo Yue; Li Xiaoxia; Wang Nan; Zhang Yining	(Singapore) Singapore; Feng Tianwei; Li Jiawei; Sun Beibei; Wang Yuegu; Yu Mengyu	(Hong Kong) Hong Kong; Jiang Huajun; Lau Sui Fei; Lin Ling; Tie Ya Na; Zhang Rui
2008	Guangzhou	(China) China; Guo Yan; Guo Yue; Li Xiaoxia; Wang Nan; Zhang Yining	(Singapore) Singapore; Feng Tianwei; Li Jiawei; Sun Beibei; Wang Yuegu; Yu Mengyu	(Japan) Japan; Hiroko Fujii; Ai Fukuhara; Haruna Fukuoka; Sayaka Hirano; Kasumi Ishikawa
2010	Moscow	(Singapore) Singapore; Feng Tianwei; Li Jiawei; Sun Beibei; Wang Yuegu; Yu Mengyu	(China) China; Ding Ning; Guo Yan; Guo Yue; Li Xiaoxia; Liu Shiwen	(Germany) Germany; Elke Schall; Kristin Silbereisen; Sabine Winter; Wu Jiaduo
2010	Moscow	(Singapore) Singapore; Feng Tianwei; Li Jiawei; Sun Beibei; Wang Yuegu; Yu Mengyu	(China) China; Ding Ning; Guo Yan; Guo Yue; Li Xiaoxia; Liu Shiwen	(Japan) Japan; Hiroko Fujii; Ai Fujinuma; Ai Fukuhara; Sayaka Hirano; Kasumi Ishikawa
2012	Dortmund	(China) China; Ding Ning; Guo Yan; Guo Yue; Li Xiaoxia; Liu Shiwen	(Singapore) Singapore; Feng Tianwei; Li Jiawei; Sun Beibei; Wang Yuegu; Yu Mengyu	(Hong Kong) Hong Kong; Jiang Huajun; Lee Ho Ching; Ng Wing Nam; Tie Ya Na; Yu Kwok See
2012	Dortmund	(China) China; Ding Ning; Guo Yan; Guo Yue; Li Xiaoxia; Liu Shiwen	(Singapore) Singapore; Feng Tianwei; Li Jiawei; Sun Beibei; Wang Yuegu; Yu Mengyu	(South Korea) South Korea; Dang Ye-seo; Kim Kyung-ah; Park Mi-young; Seok Ha-jung; Yang Ha-eun
2014	Tokyo	(China) China; Chen Meng; Ding Ning; Li Xiaoxia; Liu Shiwen; Zhu Yuling	(Japan) Japan; Sayaka Hirano; Yuka Ishigaki; Kasumi Ishikawa; Sakura Mori; Saki Tashiro	(Hong Kong) Hong Kong; Doo Hoi Kem; Jiang Huajun; Lee Ho Ching; Ng Wing Nam; Tie Ya Na
2014	Tokyo	(China) China; Chen Meng; Ding Ning; Li Xiaoxia; Liu Shiwen; Zhu Yuling	(Japan) Japan; Sayaka Hirano; Yuka Ishigaki; Kasumi Ishikawa; Sakura Mori; Saki Tashiro	(Singapore) Singapore; Feng Tianwei; Isabelle Li; Yee Herng Hwee; Yu Mengyu
2016	Kuala Lumpur	(China) China; Chen Meng; Ding Ning; Li Xiaoxia; Liu Shiwen; Zhu Yuling	(Japan) Japan; Ai Fukuhara; Yui Hamamoto; Kasumi Ishikawa; Mima Ito; Misako Wakamiya	(Chinese Taipei) Chinese Taipei; Chen Szu-yu; Cheng Hsien-tzu; Cheng I-ching; Lin Chia-hui; Liu Hsing-yin
2016	Kuala Lumpur	(China) China; Chen Meng; Ding Ning; Li Xiaoxia; Liu Shiwen; Zhu Yuling	(Japan) Japan; Ai Fukuhara; Yui Hamamoto; Kasumi Ishikawa; Mima Ito; Misako Wakamiya	(North Korea) North Korea; Cha Hyo-sim; Kim Song-i; Ri Mi-gyong; Ri Myong-sun
2018	Halmstad	(China) China; Chen Meng; Ding Ning; Liu Shiwen; Wang Manyu; Zhu Yuling	(Japan) Japan; Hina Hayata; Miu Hirano; Kasumi Ishikawa; Mima Ito; Miyu Nagasaki	(Hong Kong) Hong Kong; Doo Hoi Kem; Lee Ho Ching; Mak Tze Wing; Ng Wing Nam; Minnie Soo
2018	Halmstad	(China) China; Chen Meng; Ding Ning; Liu Shiwen; Wang Manyu; Zhu Yuling	(Japan) Japan; Hina Hayata; Miu Hirano; Kasumi Ishikawa; Mima Ito; Miyu Nagasaki	Korea; Cha Hyo-sim; Choe Hyon-hwa; Jeon Ji-hee; Kim Ji-ho; Kim Nam-hae; Kim Song-i; Suh Hyo-won; Yang Ha-eun; Yoo Eun-chong
2022	Chengdu	(China) China; Chen Meng; Chen Xingtong; Sun Yingsha; Wang Manyu; Wang Yidi	(Japan) Japan; Hina Hayata; Mima Ito; Miyuu Kihara; Miyu Nagasaki; Hitomi Sato	(Chinese Taipei) Chinese Taipei; Chen Szu-yu; Cheng I-ching; Huang Yi-hua; Li Yu-jhun; Liu Hsing-yin
2022	Chengdu	(China) China; Chen Meng; Chen Xingtong; Sun Yingsha; Wang Manyu; Wang Yidi	(Japan) Japan; Hina Hayata; Mima Ito; Miyuu Kihara; Miyu Nagasaki; Hitomi Sato	(Germany) Germany; Han Ying; Annett Kaufmann; Nina Mittelham; Shan Xiaona; Sabine Winter
2024	Busan	(China) China; Chen Meng; Chen Xingtong; Sun Yingsha; Wang Manyu; Wang Yidi	(Japan) Japan; Miwa Harimoto; Hina Hayata; Miu Hirano; Mima Ito; Miyuu Kihara	(France) France; Camille Lutz; Charlotte Lutz; Prithika Pavade; Jia Nan Yuan; Audrey Zarif
2024	Busan	(China) China; Chen Meng; Chen Xingtong; Sun Yingsha; Wang Manyu; Wang Yidi	(Japan) Japan; Miwa Harimoto; Hina Hayata; Miu Hirano; Mima Ito; Miyuu Kihara	(Hong Kong) Hong Kong; Doo Hoi Kem; Lam Yee Lok; Lee Ho Ching; Ng Wing Lam; Zhu Chengzhu
2026	London	(China) China; Chen Xingtong; Kuai Man; Sun Yingsha; Wang Manyu; Wang Yidi	(Japan) Japan; Miwa Harimoto; Honoka Hashimoto; Hina Hayata; Rin Mende; Miyu Nagasaki	(Germany) Germany; Han Ying; Annett Kaufmann; Nina Mittelham; Yuan Wan; Sabine Winter
2026	London	(China) China; Chen Xingtong; Kuai Man; Sun Yingsha; Wang Manyu; Wang Yidi	(Japan) Japan; Miwa Harimoto; Honoka Hashimoto; Hina Hayata; Rin Mende; Miyu Nagasaki	(Romania) Romania; Adina Diaconu; Andreea Dragoman; Elizabeta Samara; Bernadette Szőcs; Elena Zaharia

==== Performance by nations in women's team ====
Team	Winners	Runners-up	Third place
China	24 (1965, '75, '77, '79, '81, '83, '85, '87, '89, '93, '95, '97, 2000, '01, '04, '06, '08, '12, '14, '16, '18, '22, '24, '26)	5 (1961, '71, '73, '91, 2010)	3 (1957, '59, '63)
Japan	8 (1952, '54, '57, '59, '61, '63, '67, '71)	9 (1955, '65, '83, 2014, '16, '18, '22, '24, '26)	10 (1956, '69, '73, '75, '79, 2001, '04, '06, '08, '10)
Romania	5 (1950, '51, '53, '55, '56)	4 (1952, '57, '63, '69)	5 (1939, '48, '61, 2000, '26)
Czechoslovakia	3 (1935, '36, '38)	1 (1939)	5 (1933, '37, '47, '48, '50)
England	2 (1947, '48)	4 (1938, '49, '53, '56)	6 (1950, '51, '52, '54, '55, '65)
Germany	2 (1933, '39)	2 (1936, '37)	5 (1935, '97, 2010, '22, '26
United States	2 (1937, '49)	1 (1936)	1 (1947)
South Korea	1 (1973)	7 (1959, '75, '77, '81, '87, '89, '95)	6 (1971, '85, '93, 2000, '01, '12)
Singapore	1 (2010)	2 (2008, '12)	1 (2014)
Soviet Union	1 (1969)	1 (1967)	0
Korea	1 (1991)	0	1 (2018)
Hungary	0	6 (1933, '35, '47, '48, '50, '54)	5 (1949, '53, '63, '67, '87)
North Korea	0	5 (1979, '85, '93, '97, 2001)	4 (1977, '81, '83, 2016)
Hong Kong	0	2 (2004, '06)	7 (1989, '95, 2008, '12, '14, '18, '24)
Austria	0	1 (1951)	2 (1938, '53)
Chinese Taipei	0	1 (2000)	2 (2016, '22)
France	0	0	3 (1949, '91, 2024)
Wales	0	0	1 (1951)
Belarus	0	0	1 (2006)
