= 1947 World Table Tennis Championships – Men's team =

1947 Swaythling Cup (men's team)
- Location: Paris

The 1947 World Table Tennis Championships – Swaythling Cup (men's team) was the 14th edition of the men's team championship.

Czechoslovakia won the gold medal defeating the United States 5–2 in the final. Austria and France won bronze medals by virtue of finishing second in their groups.

== Swaythling Cup table ==
=== Pool A ===
Pos	Team	P	W	L	Squad
1	Czechoslovakia	8	8	0	Ivan Andreadis, Adolf Šlár, Václav Tereba, František Tokár, Bohumil Váňa
2	Austria	8	7	1	Heinrich Bednar, Otto Eckl, Johann Hartwich, Heribert Just, Ferdinand Schuech
3	Sweden	8	6	2	Tage Flisberg, Olsson, Arne Andersson, Per-Olof Croneryd, Ollen
4	Egypt	8	5	3	Moustapha, Hassan, Yehya, Hussein, Mansour
5	(Republic of Ireland) Ireland	8	4	4	Victor Mercer, Ivan Martin, Harry Thuillier, Harry O'Prey
6	(United Kingdom) Jewish Palestine	8	3	5	Samuel Schieff, Izio Rojzen, M. Goloub
7	Denmark	8	2	6	Christian Juhl, Leif Skovgård, Emil Moeller, Helmuth Jespersen, Willy Scott Nissen
8	Luxembourg	8	1	7	Metty Steimetz, Paul Oster, Fred Wirtz, Marcel Willmes, Nic Wiltzius
9	Scotland +	0	0	0	John Brown, Sidney Gillies, Peter Coia

+ withdrew

=== Pool B ===
Pos	Team	P	W	L	Squad
1	United States	8	8	0	William Holzrichter, Richard Miles, Lou Pagliaro, Sol Schiff
2	France	8	7	1	Alex Agopoff, Guy Amouretti, Maurice Bordrez, Michel Haguenauer, Michel Lanskoy
3	Hungary	8	6	2	Ferenc Soos, Ferenc Sidó, Geza Eros, József Kóczián, László Várkonyi
4	England	8	5	3	Ernest Bubley, Benny Casofsky, Eric Filby, George 'Eli' Goodman, Johnny Leach
5	India	8	3	5	Sinaraman, Uttam Chandrana, Arun Kumar Ghosh, Vithal, Godrej
5	Belgium	8	3	5	Roger Lejeune, Jean Buyens, Raymond Evalenko, André Staf, Pierre De Kemper
7	Switzerland	8	2	6	Hugo Urchetti, Lucien Portal, Marcel Meyer de Stadelhofen, Frei
7	Wales	8	2	6	Walter Sweetland, S. Jones, Gerald Chugg, Peter Burrows, Roy Evans
9	Netherlands	8	0	8	Cor Du Buy, André Thunnissen, Bep Van Ham, Wim Stoop, Will van Zoelen

== Final ==
Czechoslovakia 5		United States 2
Andreadis	lost to	Pagliaro
Váňa	bt	Pagliaro
Tereba	lost to	Schiff
Andreadis	bt	Schiff
Andreadis	bt	Miles
Tereba	bt	Miles
Váňa	bt	Miles

== See also ==
- List of World Table Tennis Championships medalists
