= 1948 World Table Tennis Championships – Men's team =

1948 Swaythling Cup (men's team)
- Location: Wembley, London

The 1948 World Table Tennis Championships – Swaythling Cup (men's team) was the 15th edition of the men's team championship.

Czechoslovakia won the gold medal defeating France 5–2 in the final.

== Medalists ==
=== Team ===
Event	Gold	Silver	Bronze
Swaythling Cup	Czechoslovakia; Ivan Andreadis; Max Marinko; Ladislav Štípek; František Tokár; Bohumil Váňa	France; Guy Amouretti; Maurice Bordrez; Charles Dubouillé; Michel Haguenauer; Eugène Manchiska	Austria; Heinrich Bednar; Rudolf Diwald; Otto Eckl; Heribert Just; Herbert Wunsch
Swaythling Cup	Czechoslovakia; Ivan Andreadis; Max Marinko; Ladislav Štípek; František Tokár; Bohumil Váňa	France; Guy Amouretti; Maurice Bordrez; Charles Dubouillé; Michel Haguenauer; Eugène Manchiska	United States; Richard Miles; Garrett Nash; William Price; Marty Reisman

== Swaythling Cup tables ==
=== Pool A ===
Pos	Team	P	W	L	Pts
1	United States	4	4	0	4
2	England	4	3	1	3
3	Hungary	4	2	2	2
4	Sweden	4	1	3	1
5	Jersey	4	0	4	0
6	India +	0	0	0	0

+withdrew

=== Pool B ===
Pos	Team	P	W	L	Pts
1	Czechoslovakia	5	5	0	5
2	Egypt	5	4	1	4
3	Wales	5	3	2	3
4	Scotland	5	2	3	2
5	Greece	5	1	4	1
6	Norway	5	0	5	0

=== Pool C ===
Pos	Team	P	W	L	Pts
1	Austria	5	5	0	5
2	(Socialist Federal Republic of Yugoslavia) Yugoslavia	5	4	1	4
3	Belgium	5	3	2	3
4	Netherlands	5	2	3	2
5	Luxembourg	5	1	4	1
6	Italy	5	0	5	0
7	(United Kingdom) Jewish Palestine +	0	0	0	0

+ withdrew

=== Pool D ===
Pos	Team	P	W	L	Pts
1	France	3	3	0	3
2	(Republic of Ireland) Ireland	3	2	1	2
3	Denmark	3	1	2	1
4	Trinidad and Tobago	3	0	3	0
5	Portugal +	0	0	0	0
6	Argentina +	0	0	0	0

+ withdrew

== Semifinals ==
Team One	Team Two	Score
Czechoslovakia	United States	5-2
France	Austria	5-1

== Final ==
Czechoslovakia 5		France 2	Score
Andreadis	bt	Amouretti	17-21 21-9 21-13
Andreadis	bt	Haguenauer	21-18 21-15
Štípek	lost to	Bordrez	18-21 16-21
Štípek	lost to	Haguenauer	19-21 17-21
Váňa	bt	Amouretti	21-6 21-16
Váňa	bt	Bordrez	21-9 21-5
Váňa	bt	Haguenauer	21-13 21-12

== See also ==
List of World Table Tennis Championships medalists
