= 1949 World Table Tennis Championships – Women's team =

1949 Corbillon Cup (women's team)

The 1949 World Table Tennis Championships – Corbillon Cup (women's team) was the ninth edition of the women's team championship.

United States won the gold medal defeating England 3–1 in the final. France and Hungary both won bronze medals after finishing second in their respective groups.

== Medalists ==
| Event | Gold | Silver | Bronze |
|---|---|---|---|
| | United States; Peggy McLean; Mildred Shahian; Thelma Thall | England; Pinkie Barnes; Joan Crosby; Peggy Franks; Adele Wood | France; Huguette Béolet; Jeanne Delay; Yolande Vannoni |
| | United States; Peggy McLean; Mildred Shahian; Thelma Thall | England; Pinkie Barnes; Joan Crosby; Peggy Franks; Adele Wood | Hungary; Gizi Farkas; Rozsi Karpati; Erzsébet Mezei |

== Final tables ==
=== Group A ===
| Pos | Team | P | W | L |
|---|---|---|---|---|
| 1 | United States | 7 | 7 | 0 |
| 2 | Hungary | 7 | 6 | 1 |
| 3 | Czechoslovakia | 7 | 5 | 2 |
| 4 | Scotland | 7 | 4 | 3 |
| 5 | (Socialist Federal Republic of Yugoslavia) Yugoslavia | 7 | 3 | 4 |
| 6 | Netherlands | 7 | 2 | 5 |
| 7 | Denmark | 7 | 1 | 6 |
| 8 | Norway | 7 | 0 | 7 |

- Egypt scratched from Group A

=== Group B ===
| Pos | Team | P | W | L |
|---|---|---|---|---|
| 1 | England | 6 | 6 | 0 |
| 2 | France | 6 | 5 | 1 |
| 3 | Austria | 6 | 4 | 2 |
| 4 | Wales | 6 | 3 | 3 |
| 5 | Sweden | 6 | 2 | 4 |
| 6 | Italy | 6 | 1 | 5 |
| 7 | Finland | 6 | 0 | 6 |

- Romania and Switzerland scratched from Group B

== Final ==
| United States 3 | | England 1 | Score |
|---|---|---|---|
| Shahian | lost to | Franks | 0-2 |
| McLean | bt | Barnes | 2-0 |
| Thall & McLean | bt | Franks & Barnes | 2-1 |
| McLean | bt | Franks | 2-0 |

== See also ==
List of World Table Tennis Championships medalists
