= 1948 World Table Tennis Championships – Women's doubles =

1948 Women's doubles
- Location: Wembley, London

The 1948 World Table Tennis Championships women's doubles was the 14th edition of the women's doubles championship. Vera Thomas-Dace and Peggy Franks defeated Dora Beregi and Helen Elliot in the final by three sets to one.

== Results ==
Round of 16
(England) Doris Atherton (England) E. Griffiths	22	13	11	11
(United States) Mae Clouther (England) Pinkie Barnes	20	21	21	21
(England) Dora Beregi (Scotland) Helen Elliot	21	21	21
(Egypt) Doreya Kharim Fahmy (Egypt) Kadiga Abou Heif Rifaat	15	14	12
(England) Audrey Fowler (England) Irene Lentle	21	22	23
(Czechoslovakia) E. Vanova (Czechoslovakia) Marie Zelenková	19	20	21
(England) Elizabeth Steventon (England) Molly Jones	21	21	21
(Sweden) Maya Halling (Sweden) Eina Eriksson	12	15	12
(England) Vera Thomas-Dace (England) Peggy Franks	21	21	21
(Scotland) Norrie Cowie (Scotland) Elisabeth Pithie	14	9	16
(Hungary) Gizi Farkas (Czechoslovakia) Marie Kettnerová	21	21	21
(France) Sophie Betling (France) Louise Giraud	11	8	13
(United States) Leah Thall (United States) Thelma Thall	21	21	12	21
(Belgium) Mary Detournay (Belgium) Ghisaline Roland	10	6	21	14
(Czechoslovakia) Vlasta Pokorna-Depetrisová (Czechoslovakia) Eliška Fürstová	17	13	22	12
(Austria) Gertrude Pritzi (Romania) Angelica Adelstein-Rozeanu	21	21	20	21

Quarterfinals
(United States) Clouther (England) Barnes	10	16	13
(England) Beregi (Scotland) Elliot	21	21	21
(England) Fowler (England) Lentle	14	21	22	13	21
(England) Steventon (England) Jones	21	10	20	21	16
(England) Thomas-Dace (England) Franks	21	22	21
(Hungary) Farkas (Czechoslovakia) Kettnerová	17	20	16
(United States) Thall (United States) Thall	21	23	21	13	21
(Austria) Pritzi (Romania) Adelstein-Rozeanu	23	21	16	21	16

Semifinals
(England) Beregi (Scotland) Elliot	21	21	21
(England) Fowler (England) Lentle	13	17	4
(England) Thomas-Dace (England) Franks	21	21	21
(United States) Thall (United States) Thall	14	14	17

Final
(England) Beregi (Scotland) Elliot	21	12	19	8
(England) Thomas-Dace (England) Franks	17	21	21	21

== See also ==
List of World Table Tennis Championships medalists
