= 1947 World Table Tennis Championships – Mixed doubles =

1947 Mixed doubles
- Location: Paris

The 1947 World Table Tennis Championships mixed doubles was the 14th edition of the mixed doubles championship.

Ferenc Soos and Gizi Farkas defeated Adolf Šlár and Vlasta Depetrisová in the final by three sets to one.

== Results ==
Round of 16
(England) Viktor Barna (England) Margaret Franks
(England) Jack Carrington (England) Violet Patterson
(Hungary) Geza Eros (Hungary) Rozsi Karpati
(England) Eric Filby (England) Elizabeth Blackbourn
(Hungary) Ferenc Soos (Hungary) Gizi Farkas
(Czechoslovakia) Josef Turnovský (Czechoslovakia) Marie Zelenková
(Czechoslovakia) Ivan Andreadis (Czechoslovakia) Eliška Fürstová
(Austria) Otto Eckl (Austria) Gertrude Pritzi
(Hungary) Ferenc Sidó (United States) Reba Monness
(Czechoslovakia) Ladislav Štípek (Czechoslovakia) Květa Hrušková
(Czechoslovakia) Adolf Šlár (Czechoslovakia) Vlasta Depetrisová
(France) Trouve (France) Trouve
(Netherlands) Will van Zoelen (Netherlands) Ina Kiek
(Switzerland) Hugo Urchetti (Switzerland) Alice Grandchamp
(England) Hayes (England) Margaret Osborne
(United States) William Holzrichter (United States) Davida Hawthorn

Quarterfinals
(England) Barna (England) Franks	3
(England) Filby (England) Blackbourn	0
(Hungary) Soos (Hungary) Farkas	21	21	21
(Czechoslovakia) Andreadis (Czechoslovakia) Fürstová	17	16	16
(Czechoslovakia) Štípek (Czechoslovakia) Hrušková	0
(Czechoslovakia) Šlár (Czechoslovakia) Depetrisová	3
(Switzerland) Urchetti (Switzerland) Grandchamp	2
(United States) Holzrichter (United States) Hawthorn	3

Semifinals
(England) Barna (England) Franks	21	18	21	21
(Hungary) Soos (Hungary) Farkas	17	21	17	13
(Czechoslovakia) Šlár (Czechoslovakia) Depetrisová	21	21	21
(United States) Holzrichter (United States) Hawthorne	9	6	12

Final
(Hungary) Soos (Hungary) Farkas	18	21	21	21
(Czechoslovakia) Šlár (Czechoslovakia) Depetrisová	21	13	15	18

== See also ==
- List of World Table Tennis Championships medalists
