= 1948 World Table Tennis Championships =

The 1948 World Table Tennis Championships were held in Wembley from February 4 to February 11, 1948.

== Medalists ==
=== Team ===
Event	Gold	Silver	Bronze
Swaythling Cup; Men's Team	Czechoslovakia; Ivan Andreadis; Max Marinko; Ladislav Štípek; František Tokár; Bohumil Váňa	France; Guy Amouretti; Maurice Bordrez; Charles Dubouillé; Michel Haguenauer; Eugène Manchiska	Austria; Heinrich Bednar; Rudolf Diwald; Otto Eckl; Heribert Just; Herbert Wunsch
Swaythling Cup; Men's Team	Czechoslovakia; Ivan Andreadis; Max Marinko; Ladislav Štípek; František Tokár; Bohumil Váňa	France; Guy Amouretti; Maurice Bordrez; Charles Dubouillé; Michel Haguenauer; Eugène Manchiska	United States; Richard Miles; Garrett Nash; William Price; Marty Reisman
Corbillon Cup; Women's team	England; Dora Beregi; Peggy Franks; Betty Steventon; Vera Dace-Thomas	Hungary; Gizi Farkas; Loretta Gyorgy; Rozsi Karpati	Romania; Sari Szász-Kolozsvári; Angelica Rozeanu; Gabriela Beca; Despina Mavrocordat
Corbillon Cup; Women's team	England; Dora Beregi; Peggy Franks; Betty Steventon; Vera Dace-Thomas	Hungary; Gizi Farkas; Loretta Gyorgy; Rozsi Karpati	Czechoslovakia; Eliska Fürstova; Marie Kettnerová; Vlasta Pokorna; Marie Zelenková

=== Individual ===
Event	Gold	Silver	Bronze
Men's singles	(England) Richard Bergmann	(Czechoslovakia) Bohumil Váňa	(Czechoslovakia) Ivan Andreadis
Men's singles	(England) Richard Bergmann	(Czechoslovakia) Bohumil Váňa	(France) Guy Amouretti
Women's singles	(Hungary) Gizella Farkas	(England) Vera Thomas	(Romania) Angelica Rozeanu
Women's singles	(Hungary) Gizella Farkas	(England) Vera Thomas	(Czechoslovakia) Vlasta Pokorna
Men's Doubles	(Czechoslovakia) Ladislav Štípek (Czechoslovakia) Bohumil Váňa	(England) Adrian Haydon (Hungary) Ferenc Soos	(England) Viktor Barna (England) Richard Bergmann
Men's Doubles	(Czechoslovakia) Ladislav Štípek (Czechoslovakia) Bohumil Váňa	(England) Adrian Haydon (Hungary) Ferenc Soos	(Austria) Heinrich Bednar (Austria) Herbert Wunsch
Women's doubles	(England) Margaret Franks (England) Vera Thomas	(England) Dora Beregi (Scotland) Helen Elliot	(United States) Leah Thall (United States) Thelma Thall
Women's doubles	(England) Margaret Franks (England) Vera Thomas	(England) Dora Beregi (Scotland) Helen Elliot	(England) Audrey Fowler (England) Irene Lentle
Mixed doubles	(United States) Richard Miles (United States) Thelma Thall	(Czechoslovakia) Bohumil Váňa (Czechoslovakia) Vlasta Pokorna	(England) Richard Bergmann (England) Dora Beregi
Mixed doubles	(United States) Richard Miles (United States) Thelma Thall	(Czechoslovakia) Bohumil Váňa (Czechoslovakia) Vlasta Pokorna	(Hungary) Ferenc Sidó (Romania) Angelica Rozeanu
