= 1949 World Table Tennis Championships – Women's doubles =

1949 Women's doubles

The 1949 World Table Tennis Championships women's doubles was the 15th edition of the women's doubles championship. Gizi Farkas and Helen Elliot defeated Pinkie Barnes and Joan Crosby in the final by three sets to nil.

== Results ==
Round of 16
(Hungary) Gizi Farkas (Scotland) Helen Elliot	21	21	21
(United States) Mildred Shahian (Austria) Gertrude Pritzi	11	11	14
(England) Margaret Osborne-Knott (Wales) Vera Rowe	21	21	20	18
(Scotland) Rena Tolan (Scotland) Elisabeth Pithie	23	11	22	21
(Czechoslovakia) Ida Koťátková (Czechoslovakia) Eliška Fürstová	21	21	21
(Sweden) Kerstin Olssen (Sweden) Mejt Levin	6	4	11
(England) Peggy Franks (England) Adele Wood	21	15	21	16	21
(France) Huguette Béolet (France) Jeanne Delay	14	21	15	21	10
(Sweden) Eina Eriksson (Sweden) Jris Persson	21	22	21
(Sweden) Gunilla Stockenberg (Sweden) Maya Helling	16	20	19
(England) Pinkie Barnes (England) Joan Crosby	17	21	10	21	24
(Czechoslovakia) Květa Hrušková (Czechoslovakia) Marie Zelenková	21	17	21	15	22
(Sweden) Sonja Ljungberg (Sweden) Gerd Kristiansson	21	19	21	21
(Sweden) Inga Klasson (Sweden) Ulla Rudbeck	14	21	15	13
(Hungary) Rózsi Kárpáti (Hungary) Erzsébet Mezei	21	21	21
(Wales) Audrey Bates (Wales) Nancy Evans-Roy	13	18	16

Quarterfinals
(Scotland) Elliot (Hungary) Farkas	21	21	21
(Scotland) Pithie (Scotland) Tolan	14	15	6
(Czechoslovakia) Koťátková (Czechoslovakia) Fürstová	21	18	11	21	21
(England) Franks (England) Wood	15	21	21	16	19
(Sweden) Eriksson (Sweden) Persson	21	10	8	21	12
(England) Barnes (England) Crosby	17	21	21	18	21
(Sweden) Ljungberg (Sweden) Kristiansson	3	10	9
(Hungary) Kárpáti (Hungary) Mezei	21	21	21

Semifinals
(Hungary) Farkas (Scotland) Elliot	21	21	21
(Czechoslovakia) Koťátková (Czechoslovakia) Fürstová	8	5	5
(England) Barnes (England) Crosby	21	21	21
(Hungary) Karpati (Hungary) Mezei	19	16	11

Final
(Hungary) Farkas (Scotland) Elliot	21	21	21
(England) Barnes (England) Crosby	10	11	13

== See also ==
List of World Table Tennis Championships medalists
