= 1949 World Table Tennis Championships – Mixed doubles =

1949 Mixed doubles

The 1949 World Table Tennis Championships mixed doubles was the 16th edition of the mixed doubles championship.

Ferenc Sidó and Gizi Farkas defeated Bohumil Váňa and Květa Hrušková in the final by three sets to nil.

== Results ==
Round of 16
(England) Johnny Leach (England) Peggy Franks	21	21	19	25
(Czechoslovakia) Adolf Šlár (Czechoslovakia) Eliška Fürstová	14	17	21	23
(Socialist Federal Republic of Yugoslavia) Tibor Harangozo (Socialist Federal Republic of Yugoslavia) Jelisaveta Pauk	3
(England) Brian Kennedy (England) Adele Wood	0
(Sweden) Arne Neidenmark (Sweden) Gunilla Stockenberg	3
(Czechoslovakia) František Tokár (Czechoslovakia) Ida Koťátková	0
(Hungary) Ferenc Sidó (Hungary) Gizi Farkas	3
(Netherlands) Cor de Buy (Netherlands) Tineke Mostert De Zeeuw	0
(United States) Marty Reisman (United States) Peggy McLean	3
(France) Alexandre Agopoff (France) Yolande Vannoni	1
(Sweden) Tage Flisberg (Scotland) Helen Elliot	21	21	21
(France) Michel Lanskoy (France) Huguette Béolet	13	8	13
(Socialist Federal Republic of Yugoslavia) Vilim Harangozo (Socialist Federal Republic of Yugoslavia) Margita Covic	21	21	21
(Netherlands) Cor Pelser (Netherlands) Margo van Wijk	12	14	13
(Czechoslovakia) Bohumil Váňa (Czechoslovakia) Květa Hrušková	3
(Sweden) Weine Fredriksson (Sweden) Eina Ericson	1

Quarterfinals
(England) Leach (England) Franks	3
(Socialist Federal Republic of Yugoslavia) Harangozo T (Socialist Federal Republic of Yugoslavia) Pauk	2
(Sweden) Neidenmark (Sweden) Stockenberg	11	13	12
(Hungary) Sidó (Hungary) Farkas	21	21	21
(United States) Reisman (United States) Mclean	21	21	23	21
(Sweden) Flisberg (Scotland) Elliot	16	19	25	5
(Socialist Federal Republic of Yugoslavia) Harangozo V (Socialist Federal Republic of Yugoslavia) Covic	14	11	22	13
(Czechoslovakia) Váňa (Czechoslovakia) Hrušková	21	21	20	21

Semifinals
(England) Leach (England) Franks	15	12	16
(Hungary) Sidó (Hungary) Farkas	21	21	21
(United States) Reisman (United States) McLean	11	11	15
(Czechoslovakia) Váňa (Czechoslovakia) Hrušková	21	21	21

Final
(Hungary) Sidó (Hungary) Farkas	21	21	21
(Czechoslovakia) Váňa (Czechoslovakia) Hrušková	13	15	17

== See also ==
List of World Table Tennis Championships medalists
