= 1947 World Table Tennis Championships – Women's doubles =

1947 Women's doubles
- Location: Paris

The 1947 World Table Tennis Championships women's doubles was the 13th edition of the women's doubles championship. Gizi Farkas and Gertrude Pritzi defeated Mae Clouther and Reba Monness in the final by three sets to nil.

== Results ==
Round of 16
(England) Vera Dace (England) Elizabeth Blackbourn
(Kingdom of Hungary) Gizi Farkas (Austria) Gertrude Pritzi
(Czechoslovakia) Věra Votrubcová (Czechoslovakia) Vlasta Depetrisová	w/o
(United States) Davida Hawthorn (United States) Leah Thall
(Czechoslovakia) Eliška Fürstová (Czechoslovakia) Marie Zelenková
(Wales) Nancy Evans-Roy (Wales) Audrey Bates
(Egypt) Kadiga Abou Heif Rifaat (Egypt) Fahury
(Czechoslovakia) Marie Kettnerová (Czechoslovakia) Květa Hrušková
(England) Peggy Franks (Scotland) Helen Elliot
(England) Bennett (England) Wright
(United States) Reba Monness (United States) Mae Clouther
(Switzerland) Alice Grandchamp (Switzerland) Alice Siegrist
(Belgium) Mary Detournay (Belgium) Josee Wouters
(France) Huguette Beolet (Netherlands) Niesten
(England) Margaret Osborne (England) Violet Patterson

Quarterfinals
(Austria) Pritzi (Hungary) Farkas	3
(Czechoslovakia) Votrubcová (Czechoslovakia) Depetrisová	0
(United States) Hawthorn (United States) Thall	3
(Egypt) Abou Heif (Egypt) Fahury	0
(Czechoslovakia) Kettnerová (Czechoslovakia) Hrušková	2
(United States) Monness (United States) Clouther	3
(Belgium) Detournay (Belgium) Wouters	3
(England) Osborne (England) Patterson	2

Semifinals
(Austria) Pritzi (Hungary) Farkas
(United States) Hawthorn (United States) Thall
(United States) Monness (United States) Clouther
(Belgium) Detournay (Belgium) Wouters

Final
(Austria) Pritzi (Hungary) Farkas	22	21	21
(United States) Monness (United States) Clouther	20	14	9

== See also ==
List of World Table Tennis Championships medalists
