= 1949 World Table Tennis Championships =

The 1949 World Table Tennis Championships were held in Stockholm from February 4 to February 10, 1949.

== Medalists ==
=== Team ===
Event	Gold	Silver	Bronze
Swaythling Cup; Men's Team	Hungary; József Kóczián; Ferenc Sidó; Ferenc Soos; László Várkonyi	Czechoslovakia; Ivan Andreadis; Max Marinko; Ladislav Štípek; František Tokár; Bohumil Váňa	England; Viktor Barna; Richard Bergmann; Johnny Leach; Ronald Sharman; Aubrey Simons
Swaythling Cup; Men's Team	Hungary; József Kóczián; Ferenc Sidó; Ferenc Soos; László Várkonyi	Czechoslovakia; Ivan Andreadis; Max Marinko; Ladislav Štípek; František Tokár; Bohumil Váňa	United States; Douglas Cartland; James McClure; Richard Miles; Marty Reisman
Corbillon Cup; Women's team	United States; Peggy McLean; Mildred Shahian; Thelma Thall	England; Pinkie Barnes; Joan Crosby; Peggy Franks; Adele Wood	France; Huguette Béolet; Jeanne Delay; Yolande Vannoni
Corbillon Cup; Women's team	United States; Peggy McLean; Mildred Shahian; Thelma Thall	England; Pinkie Barnes; Joan Crosby; Peggy Franks; Adele Wood	Hungary; Gizi Farkas; Rozsi Karpati; Erzsébet Mezei

=== Individual ===
Event	Gold	Silver	Bronze
Men's singles	(England) Johnny Leach	(Czechoslovakia) Bohumil Váňa	(Hungary) Ferenc Soos
Men's singles	(England) Johnny Leach	(Czechoslovakia) Bohumil Váňa	(United States) Marty Reisman
Women's singles	(Hungary) Gizi Farkas	(Czechoslovakia) Kveta Hrusakova	(Austria) Gertrude Pritzi
Women's singles	(Hungary) Gizi Farkas	(Czechoslovakia) Kveta Hrusakova	(United States) Thelma Thall
Men's Doubles	(Czechoslovakia) Ivan Andreadis (Czechoslovakia) František Tokár	(Czechoslovakia) Ladislav Štípek (Czechoslovakia) Bohumil Váňa	(United States) Douglas Cartland (United States) Richard Miles
Men's Doubles	(Czechoslovakia) Ivan Andreadis (Czechoslovakia) František Tokár	(Czechoslovakia) Ladislav Štípek (Czechoslovakia) Bohumil Váňa	(England) Richard Bergmann (Sweden) Tage Flisberg
Women's doubles	(Scotland) Helen Elliott (Hungary) Gizi Farkas	(England) Pinkie Barnes (England) Joan Crosby	(Czechoslovakia) Eliska Fürstova (Czechoslovakia) Ida Kotátkova
Women's doubles	(Scotland) Helen Elliott (Hungary) Gizi Farkas	(England) Pinkie Barnes (England) Joan Crosby	(Hungary) Rozsi Karpati (Hungary) Erzsébet Mezei
Mixed doubles	(Hungary) Ferenc Sidó (Hungary) Gizi Farkas	(Czechoslovakia) Bohumil Váňa (Czechoslovakia) Kveta Hrusakova	(England) Johnny Leach (England) Peggy Franks
Mixed doubles	(Hungary) Ferenc Sidó (Hungary) Gizi Farkas	(Czechoslovakia) Bohumil Váňa (Czechoslovakia) Kveta Hrusakova	(United States) Marty Reisman (United States) Peggy McLean
