= 1947 World Table Tennis Championships – Men's doubles =

1947 Men's doubles
- Location: Paris

The 1947 World Table Tennis Championships men's doubles was the 14th edition of the men's doubles championship. Bohumil Váňa and Adolf Šlár won the title after defeating Johnny Leach and Jack Carrington in the final by three sets to nil.

== Results ==
Round of 16
(United States) Sol Schiff (United States) William Holzrichter
(Hungary) Ferenc Soos (Hungary) Ferenc Sidó
(England) Les Cohen (England) Kay
(Czechoslovakia) Bohumil Váňa (Czechoslovakia) Adolf Šlár
(France) Robert Bailleul (France) René Bailleul
(Czechoslovakia) Max Marinko (Czechoslovakia) František Tokár
(Denmark) Christian Juhl (Denmark) Emil Moeller
(England) Viktor Barna (England) Adrian Haydon
(Czechoslovakia) Václav Tereba (Czechoslovakia) Ladislav Štípek
(Austria) Otto Eckl (Austria) Ferdinand Schuech
(Czechoslovakia) Josef Turnovský (Czechoslovakia) Rudolph Vlk
(Sweden) Tage Flisberg (Sweden) Arne Andersson
(France) Alex Agopoff (France) Charles Dubouillé
(England) Johnny Leach (England) Jack Carrington
(Hungary) Geza Eros (Hungary) József Farkas
(France) Guy Collier (France) Raoul Bedoc

Quarterfinals
(Hungary) Soos (Hungary) Sidó
(Czechoslovakia) Váňa (Czechoslovakia) Šlár
(Czechoslovakia) Marinko (Czechoslovakia) Tokár
(England) Barna (England) Haydon
(Czechoslovakia) Tereba (Czechoslovakia) Štípek
(Czechoslovakia) Turnovský (Czechoslovakia) Vlk
(England) Leach (England) Carrington
(Hungary) Eros (Hungary) Farkas

Semifinals
(Czechoslovakia) Váňa (Czechoslovakia) Šlár	3
(England) Barna (England) Haydon	2
(Czechoslovakia) Tereba (Czechoslovakia) Štípek	1
(England) Leach (England) Carrington	3

Final
(Czechoslovakia) Váňa (Czechoslovakia) Šlár	21	21	21
(England) Leach (England) Carrington	8	14	15

== See also ==
List of World Table Tennis Championships medalists
