= 1948 World Table Tennis Championships – Mixed doubles =

1948 Mixed doubles
- Location: Wembley, London

The 1948 World Table Tennis Championships mixed doubles was the 15th edition of the mixed doubles championship.

Dick Miles and Thelma Thall defeated Bohumil Váňa and Vlasta Pokorna-Depetrisová in the final by three sets to two.

== Results ==
Round of 16
(Czechoslovakia) Bohumil Váňa (Czechoslovakia) Vlasta Pokorna-Depetrisová	21	21	21
(England) Ron Litten (England) Violet Patterson	8	16	18
(England) Viktor Barna (England) Margaret Franks	21	22	21
(Sweden) Bengt Grieve (Sweden) Margareta Winqvist	17	20	15
(Czechoslovakia) Ladislav Štípek (Czechoslovakia) Marie Zelenková	21	21	18	21
(England) Aubrey Simons (England) Molly Jones	11	12	21	17
(England) Richard Bergmann (England) Dora Beregi	26	21	21
(United States) Marty Reisman (United States) Mae Clouther	24	14	17
(Hungary) Ferenc Soos (Hungary) Gizi Farkas	21	21	21
(Republic of Ireland) Victor Mercer (Republic of Ireland) Mina Minshull	14	19	13
(Hungary) Ferenc Sidó (Romania) Angelica Rozeanu	21	18	21	21
(Austria) Otto Eckl (Austria) Gertrude Pritzi	15	21	17	18
(England) Johnny Leach (England) Vera Thomas	21	21	21
(Sweden) Weine Fredriksson (Sweden) Maya Halling	12	16	15
(United States) Dick Miles (United States) Thelma Thall	21	22	21	21
(France) Eugène Manchiska (France) Catherine Mesiki	19	24	11	16

Quarterfinals
(Czechoslovakia) Váňa (Czechoslovakia) Pokorna-Depetrisová	18	21	21	14	21
(England) Barna (England) Franks	21	15	12	21	12
(Czechoslovakia) Štípek (Czechoslovakia) Zelenková	9	9	14
(England) Bergmann (England) Beregi	21	21	21
(Hungary) Soos (Hungary) Farkas	14	20	15
(Hungary) Sidó (Romania) Rozeanu	21	22	21
(England) Leach (England) Thomas	16	21	21	24	19
(United States) Miles (United States) Thall	21	11	16	26	21

Semifinals
(Czechoslovakia) Váňa (Czechoslovakia) Pokorna-Depetrisová	16	21	5	21	21
(England) Bergmann (England) Beregi	21	14	21	14	18
(Hungary) Sidó (Romania) Rozeanu	18	20	21	16
(United States) Miles (United States) Thall	21	22	18	21

Final
(Czechoslovakia) Váňa (Czechoslovakia) Pokorna-Depetrisová	21	21	18	19	12
(United States) Miles (United States) Thall	13	14	21	21	21

== See also ==
List of World Table Tennis Championships medalists
