= 1947 World Table Tennis Championships – Women's team =

1947 Corbillon Cup (women's team)
- Location: Paris

The 1947 World Table Tennis Championships – Corbillon Cup (women's team) was the seventh edition of the women's team championship.

England won the gold medal defeating Hungary 3–0 in the final. Czechoslovakia and the United States won bronze medals after finishing second in their respective groups. The actual trophy had been lost during the war so a replica trophy was awarded.

== Medalists ==
=== Team ===
Event	Gold	Silver	Bronze
	England; Elizabeth Blackbourn; Vera Dace; Peggy Franks; Margaret Osborne-Knott	Hungary; Éva Anderlik; Gizi Farkas; Rozsi Karpati; Béláné Vermes	Czechoslovakia; Vlasta Depetrisová; Eliška Fürstová; Marie Kettnerová; Věra Votrubcová
	England; Elizabeth Blackbourn; Vera Dace; Peggy Franks; Margaret Osborne-Knott	Hungary; Éva Anderlik; Gizi Farkas; Rozsi Karpati; Béláné Vermes	United States; Mae Clouther; Davida Hawthorn; Reba Monness; Leah Thall

== Final tables ==
=== Group A ===
Pos	Team	P	W	L
1	Hungary	3	3	0
2	Czechoslovakia	3	2	1
3	Wales	4	2	2
4	Netherlands	4	1	3
5	Austria *	2	0	2
6	Romania +	0	0	0
6	Egypt +	0	0	0
6	Luxembourg +	0	0	0

+ withdrew / * withdrew after 2 games

=== Group B ===
Pos	Team	P	W	L
1	England	6	6	0
2	United States	6	5	1
3	Belgium	6	3	3
3	Switzerland	6	3	3
5	Scotland	6	2	4
5	France	6	2	4
7	Sweden	6	0	6

=== Final ===
Team One	Team Two	Score
England	Hungary	3-0

== See also ==
List of World Table Tennis Championships medalists
