= 1949 World Table Tennis Championships – Women's singles =

1949 Women's singles

The 1949 World Table Tennis Championships women's singles was the 16th edition of the women's singles championship. Gizi Farkas defeated Květa Hrušková in the final by three sets to one, to win claim a third consecutive title.

== Results ==
Round of 16
(France) Jeanne Delay	3
(France) Yolande Vannoni	1
(United States) Thelma Thall	3
(Czechoslovakia) Marie Zelenková	0
(Scotland) Helen Elliot	3
(Italy) Imperia Marchionne	0
(Czechoslovakia) Květa Hrušková	w/o
(Sweden) Jris Persson
(Austria) Gertrude Pritzi	3
(France) Huguette Béolet	0
(Czechoslovakia) Eliška Fürstová	3
(United States) Mildred Shahian	2
(England) Margaret Franks	3
(Czechoslovakia) Ida Koťátková	1
(Netherlands) Margo Van Wijk	0
(Hungary) Gizi Farkas	3

Quarterfinals
(France) Delay	13	21	16	21	12
(United States) Thall	21	11	21	19	21
(Scotland) Elliot	10	8	15
(Czechoslovakia) Hrušková	21	21	21
(Austria) Pritzi	21	21	21
(Czechoslovakia) Fürstová	8	16	14
(England) Franks	11	23	21	15
(Hungary) Farkas	21	25	18	21

Semifinals
(United States) Thall	10	15	21	21	18
(Czechoslovakia) Hrušková	21	21	15	18	21
(Austria) Pritzi	21	21	1+	3+	0+
(Hungary) Farkas	12	13	8+	4+	3+

Final
(Czechoslovakia) Hrušková	21	18	8	9
(Hungary) Farkas	19	21	21	21

+ Time limit rule applied

== See also ==
List of World Table Tennis Championships medalists
