= 1947 World Table Tennis Championships =

The 1947 World Table Tennis Championships were held in Paris from February 25 to March 7, 1947.

== Medalists ==
=== Team ===
Event	Gold	Silver	Bronze
Swaythling Cup; Men's Team	Czechoslovakia; Ivan Andreadis; Adolf Šlár; Václav Tereba; František Tokár; Bohumil Váňa	United States; William Holzrichter; Richard Miles; Lou Pagliaro; Sol Schiff	Austria; Heinrich Bednar; Otto Eckl; Johann Hartwich; Heribert Just; Ferdinand Schuech
Swaythling Cup; Men's Team	Czechoslovakia; Ivan Andreadis; Adolf Šlár; Václav Tereba; František Tokár; Bohumil Váňa	United States; William Holzrichter; Richard Miles; Lou Pagliaro; Sol Schiff	France; Alex Agopoff; Guy Amouretti; Maurice Bordrez; Michel Haguenauer; Michel Lanskoy
Corbillon Cup; Women's team	England; Elizabeth Blackbourn; Vera Dace; Peggy Franks; Margaret Osborne-Knott	Hungary; Éva Anderlik; Gizi Farkas; Rozsi Karpati; Béláné Vermes	Czechoslovakia; Vlasta Depetrisová; Eliška Fürstová; Marie Kettnerová; Věra Votrubcová
Corbillon Cup; Women's team	England; Elizabeth Blackbourn; Vera Dace; Peggy Franks; Margaret Osborne-Knott	Hungary; Éva Anderlik; Gizi Farkas; Rozsi Karpati; Béláné Vermes	United States; Mae Clouther; Davida Hawthorn; Reba Monness; Leah Thall

=== Individual ===
Event	Gold	Silver	Bronze
Men's singles	(Czechoslovakia) Bohumil Váňa	(Hungary) Ferenc Sidó	(England) Johnny Leach
Men's singles	(Czechoslovakia) Bohumil Váňa	(Hungary) Ferenc Sidó	(United States) Lou Pagliaro
Women's singles	(Hungary) Gizi Farkas	(England) Elizabeth Blackbourn	(England) Vera Dace
Women's singles	(Hungary) Gizi Farkas	(England) Elizabeth Blackbourn	(Austria) Gertrude Pritzi
Men's Doubles	(Czechoslovakia) Adolf Šlár (Czechoslovakia) Bohumil Váňa	(England) Jack Carrington (England) Johnny Leach	(England) Viktor Barna (England) Adrian Haydon
Men's Doubles	(Czechoslovakia) Adolf Šlár (Czechoslovakia) Bohumil Váňa	(England) Jack Carrington (England) Johnny Leach	(Czechoslovakia) Ladislav Štípek (Czechoslovakia) Václav Tereba
Women's doubles	(Hungary) Gizi Farkas (Austria) Gertrude Pritzi	(United States) Mae Clouther (United States) Reba Monness	(United States) Davida Hawthorn (United States) Leah Thall
Women's doubles	(Hungary) Gizi Farkas (Austria) Gertrude Pritzi	(United States) Mae Clouther (United States) Reba Monness	(Belgium) Mary Detournay (Belgium) Josee Wouters
Mixed doubles	(Hungary) Ferenc Soos (Hungary) Gizi Farkas	(Czechoslovakia) Adolf Šlár (Czechoslovakia) Vlasta Depetrisová	(England) Viktor Barna (England) Margaret Franks
Mixed doubles	(Hungary) Ferenc Soos (Hungary) Gizi Farkas	(Czechoslovakia) Adolf Šlár (Czechoslovakia) Vlasta Depetrisová	(United States) William Holzrichter (United States) Davida Hawthorn
