= 1948 World Table Tennis Championships – Men's doubles =

1948 Men's doubles
- Location: Wembley, London

The 1948 World Table Tennis Championships men's doubles was the 15th edition of the men's doubles championship. Bohumil Váňa and Ladislav Štípek won the title after defeating Adrian Haydon and Ferenc Soos in the final by three sets to nil.

== Results ==
Round of 16
(Sweden) Weine Fredriksson (Sweden) Sven Cederholm	20	20	21	18
(Socialist Federal Republic of Yugoslavia) Vilim Harangozo (Socialist Federal Republic of Yugoslavia) Žarko Dolinar	22	22	19	21
(Austria) Heinrich Bednar (Austria) Herbert Wunsch	18	19	21	21	21
(United States) Dick Miles (United States) Marty Reisman	21	21	13	19	15
(England) Adrian Haydon (Hungary) Ferenc Soos	16	14	21	21	21
(Hungary) Ferenc Sidó (Hungary) József Kóczián	21	21	9	19	18
(Czechoslovakia) Ivan Andreadis (Czechoslovakia) Jozef Turk	21	21	21
(Czechoslovakia) Max Marinko (Czechoslovakia) František Tokár	13	15	16
(Czechoslovakia) Bohumil Váňa (Czechoslovakia) Ladislav Štípek	21	21	21
(England) Howard Walton (England) Robert MacKay	10	10	5
(Sweden) Tage Flisberg (Sweden) Arne Niedenmark	21	21	21
(Egypt) Mansour Helmy (Egypt) Hassan Abou Heif	11	17	18
(England) Richard Bergmann (England) Viktor Barna	21	21	21
(England) Geoff Harrower (England) Ken Stanley	9	14	16
(United States) William Price (United States) Garrett Nash	21	21	21
(England) Ron Langner (England) Roy Markwell	19	18	16

Quarterfinals
(Socialist Federal Republic of Yugoslavia) Harangozo (Socialist Federal Republic of Yugoslavia) Dolinar	15	21	16	21	18
(Austria) Bednar (Austria) Wunsch	21	19	21	11	21
(England) Haydon (Hungary) Soos	13	21	21	18	21
(Czechoslovakia) Andreadis (Czechoslovakia) Tuerk	21	19	13	21	15
(Czechoslovakia) Váňa (Czechoslovakia) Štípek	21	21	21
(Sweden) Flisberg (Sweden) Niedenmark	19	13	15
(England) Bergmann (England) Barna	22	16	21	21
(United States) Price (United States) Nash	20	21	12	17

Semifinals
(Austria) Bednar (Austria) Wunsch	7	20	18
(England) Haydon (Hungary) Soos	21	22	21
(Czechoslovakia) Váňa (Czechoslovakia) Štípek	21	21	21
(England) Bergmann (England) Barna	10	15	16

Final
(England) Haydon (Hungary) Soos	18	15	13
(Czechoslovakia) Váňa (Czechoslovakia) Štípek	21	21	21

== See also ==
List of World Table Tennis Championships medalists
