= 1948 World Table Tennis Championships – Women's singles =

1948 Women's singles
- Location: Wembley, London

The 1948 World Table Tennis Championships women's singles was the 15th edition of the women's singles championship. Gizi Farkas defeated Vera Thomas-Dace in the final by three sets to two, to win the title.

== Results ==
Round of 16
(Austria) Gertrude Pritzi	21	24	21
(France) Yolande Vannoni	15	22	9
(England) Vera Thomas-Dace	21	21	21
(Romania) Sári Kolozsvári	6	14	17
(Czechoslovakia) Vlasta Pokorna-Depetrisová	21	19	21	15	21
(England) Margaret Franks	16	21	13	21	18
(Hungary) Rozsi Karpati	21	21	18	20	21
(United States) Thelma Thall	14	19	21	22	16
(Hungary) Gizi Farkas	22	21	16	21
(Czechoslovakia) Eliska Furstova	20	13	21	14
(United States) Lea Thall	21	21	21
(Scotland) Elisabeth Pithie	13	8	12
(Romania) Angelica-Adelstein Rozeanu	21	21	21
(France) Huguette Beolet	10	12	10
(England) Elizabeth Steventon	17	17	11
(Scotland) Helen Elliot	21	21	21

Quarterfinals
(Austria) Pritzi	10	12	9
(England) Thomas-Dace	21	21	21
(Czechoslovakia) Pokorna-Depetrisová	21	21	21
(Hungary) Karpati	11	11	18
(Hungary) Farkas	21	21	21
(United States) Thall	14	16	10
(Romania) Rozeanu	21	21	21
(Scotland) Elliot	10	12	9

Semifinals
(England) Thomas-Dace	21	21	21
(Czechoslovakia) Pokorna-Depetrisová	11	8	17
(Hungary) Farkas+	23	21	21
(Romania) Rozeanu+	21	10	14

Final
(England) Thomas-Dace	21	16	18	21	12
(Hungary) Farkas	18	21	21	16	21

+ Match replayed after time limit rule inconsistencies (original score was Farkas winning 13-21 9-21 21-9 21-18 29-27)

== See also ==
List of World Table Tennis Championships medalists
