= 1948 World Table Tennis Championships – Women's team =

1948 Corbillon Cup (women's team)
- Location: Wembley, London

The 1948 World Table Tennis Championships – Corbillon Cup (women's team) was the eighth edition of the women's team championship.

England won the gold medal defeating Hungary 3–1 in the final. Czechoslovakia and Romania won bronze medals after finishing second in their respective groups.

== Medalists ==
=== Team ===
Event	Gold	Silver	Bronze
	England; Dora Beregi; Peggy Franks; Betty Steventon; Vera Dace-Thomas	Hungary; Gizi Farkas; Loretta Gyorgy; Rozsi Karpati	Romania; Sari Szász-Kolozsvári; Angelica Rozeanu; G Beca; Despina Mavrocordat
	England; Dora Beregi; Peggy Franks; Betty Steventon; Vera Dace-Thomas	Hungary; Gizi Farkas; Loretta Gyorgy; Rozsi Karpati	Czechoslovakia; Eliska Fürstova; Marie Kettnerová; Vlasta Pokorna; Marie Zelenková

== Final tables ==
=== Group A ===
Pos	Team	P	W	L
1	England	7	7	0
2	Romania	7	6	1
3	United States	7	5	2
4	Belgium	7	4	3
5	Scotland	7	3	4
6	Austria	7	2	5
7	Wales	7	1	6
8	Jersey	7	0	7

=== Group B ===
Pos	Team	P	W	L
1	Hungary	7	7	0
2	Czechoslovakia	7	6	1
3	France	7	5	2
4	Egypt	7	4	3
5	(Republic of Ireland) Ireland	7	3	4
6	Netherlands	7	2	5
7	Sweden	7	1	6
8	Luxembourg	7	0	7

=== Final ===
England 3		Hungary 1	Score
Beregi	bt	Farkas	21-19 21-15
Beregi	bt	Karpati	21-10 21-13
Dace-Thomas	lost to	Farkas	16-21 14-21
Beregi & Dace-Thomas	bt	Farkas & Karpati	18-21 21-14 21-13

== See also ==
List of World Table Tennis Championships medalists
