= 1949 World Table Tennis Championships – Men's doubles =

1949 Men's doubles

The 1949 World Table Tennis Championships men's doubles was the 16th edition of the men's doubles championship. Ivan Andreadis and František Tokár won the title after defeating Bohumil Váňa and Ladislav Štípek in the final by three sets to nil.

== Results ==
Round of 16
(England) Richard Bergmann (Sweden) Tage Flisberg	3
(Scotland) Victor Garland (Scotland) Jack Hillan	0
(United States) Jimmy McClure (United States) Marty Reisman	3
(Socialist Federal Republic of Yugoslavia) Vilim Harangozo (Socialist Federal Republic of Yugoslavia) Tibor Harangozo	1
(Sweden) Liss Larsson (Sweden) Bengt Grive	3
(England) Tommy Sears (England) Brian Kennedy	1
(Czechoslovakia) Bohumil Váňa (Czechoslovakia) Ladislav Štípek	3
(Sweden) Arne Niedenmark (Sweden) Olle Blomqvist	1
(England) Viktor Barna (England) Johnny Leach	3
(Finland) Rolf Biese (Finland) Leif Malmborg	0
(Czechoslovakia) Ivan Andreadis (Czechoslovakia) František Tokár	3
(Sweden) Weine Fredriksson (Sweden) Sven Cederholm	1
(France) Michel Haguenauer (France) Guy Amouretti	3
(Socialist Federal Republic of Yugoslavia) Žarko Dolinar (Socialist Federal Republic of Yugoslavia) Nandor Roza	0
(Poland) Alojzy Ehrlich (Czechoslovakia) Adolf Šlár	0
(United States) Dick Miles (United States) Douglas Cartland	3

Quarterfinals
(England) Bergmann (Sweden) Flisberg	3
(Socialist Federal Republic of Yugoslavia) Harangozo (Socialist Federal Republic of Yugoslavia) Harangozo	1
(Sweden) Larsson (Sweden) Grice	0
(Czechoslovakia) Váňa (Czechoslovakia) Štípek	3
(England) Barna (England) Leach	0
(Czechoslovakia) Andreadis (Czechoslovakia) Tokár	3
(France) Haguenauer (France) Amouretti
(United States) Miles (United States) Cartland	3

Semifinals
(England) Bergmann (Sweden) Flisberg	1
(Czechoslovakia) Váňa (Czechoslovakia) Štípek	3
(Czechoslovakia) Andreadis (Czechoslovakia) Tokár	3
(United States) Miles (United States) Cartland	1

Final
(Czechoslovakia) Váňa (Czechoslovakia) Štípek	18	8	21
(Czechoslovakia) Andreadis (Czechoslovakia) Tokár	21	21	23

== See also ==
- List of World Table Tennis Championships medalists
