= 1948 World Table Tennis Championships – Men's singles =

1948 Men's singles
- Location: Wembley, London

The 1948 World Table Tennis Championships men's singles was the 15th edition of the men's singles championship.

Richard Bergmann defeated Bohumil Váňa in the final, winning three sets to two to secure the title.

== Results ==
Round of 16
(England) Richard Bergmann	21	21	18	21
(Hungary) Ferenc Soos	15	12	21	12
(Austria) Heribert Just	21	21	21	13	21
(France) Eugène Manchiska	16	23	11	21	19
(England) Viktor Barna	17	21	21	15	23
(United States) Garrett Nash	21	11	16	21	21
(Czechoslovakia) Ivan Andreadis	21	15	21	21
(Czechoslovakia) Ladislav Štípek	10	21	10	12
(Czechoslovakia) Bohumil Váňa	21	21	21
(Sweden) Weine Fredriksson	11	15	13
(United States) Dick Miles	21	21	19	21
(Hungary) Ferenc Sidó	17	10	21	19
(England) Johnny Leach	13	22	15	21	12
(France) Guy Amouretti	21	20	21	13	21
(Czechoslovakia) František Tokár	21	11	21	21
(England) Aubrey Simons	13	21	17	15

Quarterfinals
(England) Bergmann	22	21	21
(Austria) Just	20	13	14
(England) Barna	21	21	19	21
(Czechoslovakia) Andreadis	9	17	21	13
(Czechoslovakia) Váňa	21	17	14	21	21
(United States) Miles	15	21	21	12	18
(France) Amouretti	22	21	21
(Czechoslovakia) Tokár	20	14	14

Semifinals
(England) Bergmann	17	18	21	25	21
(Czechoslovakia) Andreadis	21	21	7	23	16
(Czechoslovakia) Váňa	21	17	14	21	21
(France) Amouretti	15	21	21	12	18

Final
(England) Bergmann	21	18	21	14	21
(Czechoslovakia) Váňa	12	21	19	21	10

== See also ==
List of World Table Tennis Championships medalists
