= 1947 World Table Tennis Championships – Women's singles =

1947 Women's singles
- Location: Paris

The 1947 World Table Tennis Championships women's singles was the 14th edition of the women's singles championship. Gizi Farkas defeated Elizabeth Blackbourn in the final by three sets to nil, to win the title.

== Results ==
Round of 16
(Czechoslovakia) Vlasta Depetrisová	2
(Czechoslovakia) Květa Hrušková	3
(England) Vera Dace	3
(United States) Davida Hawthorn	2
(Czechoslovakia) Marie Kettnerová	0
(Hungary) Gizi Farkas	3
(England) Violet Patterson
(Switzerland) Alice Siegrist
(Scotland) Helen Elliot	3
(United States) Mae Clouther	0
(England) Elizabeth Blackbourn
(Czechoslovakia) Věra Votrubcová
(Egypt) Kadiga Abou Heif
(France) Sophie Betling
(Austria) Gertrude Pritzi	3
(Czechoslovakia) Eliska Furstova	0

Quarterfinals
(Czechoslovakia) Hrušková	0
(England) Dace	3
(Hungary) Farkas	3
(England) Patterson	0
(Scotland) Elliot	2
(England) Blackbourn	3
(Egypt) Abou Heif	0
(Austria) Pritzi	3

Semifinals
(England) Dace	3
(Hungary) Farkas	1
(England) Blackbourn	3
(Austria) Pritzi	2

Final
(Hungary) Farkas	21	21	21
(England) Blackbourn	16	19	12

== See also ==
- List of World Table Tennis Championships medalists
