= U.S. Open (table tennis) =

The annual U.S. Open is the oldest currently running table tennis tournament in the United States. It attracts over 1000 athletes annually. The first events were actually run by either the New York Table Tennis Club or the American Ping Pong Association. The first USA Table Tennis (USTTA) tournament was held in 1934.

The U.S. Open has been previously held in various locations, including Anaheim, California; Charlotte, North Carolina; Chicago, Illinois; Las Vegas, Nevada; Fort Lauderdale, Florida; Grand Rapids, Michigan; and Milwaukee, Wisconsin.

Due to its international nature, most events are played under International Table Tennis Federation (ITTF) rules and at times the tournament has been included as an ITTF Pro Tour / World Tour event.

== List of champions ==
Year	Men's singles	Women's singles	Men's doubles	Women's doubles	Mixed doubles
1931	(United States) Marcus Schussheim				
1932 (Note: New York Table Tennis Club tournament)	(United States) Marcus Schussheim				
1932 (Note: American Ping Pong Association tournament)	(United States) Coleman Clark				
1933	(United States) Sidney Heitner	(United States) Fan Pockrose			
1933	(United States) James Jacobson	(United States) Jay Purves			
1934	(United States) Sol Schiff	(United States) Iris Little			
1934	(United States) Jimmy McClure	(United States) Ruth Aarons			
1935	(United States) Abe Berenbaum	(United States) Ruth Aarons			
1936	(Kingdom of Hungary (1920–1946)) Victor Barna	(United States) Ruth Aarons			
1937	(Kingdom of Hungary (1920–1946)) Laszlo Bellak	(United States) Ruth Aarons			
1938	(Kingdom of Hungary (1920–1946)) Laszlo Bellak	(United States) Emily Fuller			
1939	(United States) Jimmy McClure	(United States) Emily Fuller			
1940	(United States) Lou Pagliaro	(United States) Sally Green			
1941	(United States) Lou Pagliaro	(United States) Sally Green			
1942	(United States) Lou Pagliaro	(United States) Sally Green			
1943	(United States) W. Holzrichter	(United States) Sally Green			
1944	(United States) John Somael	(United States) Sally Green			
1945	(United States) Dick Miles	(United States) D. Hawthorne			
1946	(United States) Dick Miles	(United States) Bernice Charney			
1947	(United States) Dick Miles	(United States) Leah Thall			
1948	(United States) Dick Miles	(United States) Peggy McLean			
1949	(United States) Dick Miles	(United States) Leah Neuberger			
1950	(England) Johnny Leach	(United States) Reba Moness			
1951	(United States) Dick Miles	(United States) Leah Neuberger			
1952	(United States) Lou Pagliaro	(United States) Leah Neuberger			
1953	(United States) Dick Miles	(United States) Leah Neuberger			
1954	(United States) Dick Miles	(United States) Mildred Shahian			
1955	(United States) Dick Miles	(United States) Leah Neuberger			
1956	(United States) Erwin Klein	(United States) Leah Neuberger			
1957	(United States) Bernie Bukiet	(United States) Leah Neuberger			
1958	(United States) Marty Reisman	(United States) Susie Hoshi			
1959	(United States) Bob Gusikoff	(United States) Susie Hoshi			
1960	(United States) Marty Reisman	(United States) Sharon Acton			
1961	(United States) Erwin Klein	(United States) Leah Neuberger			
1962	(United States) Dick Miles	(United States) Mildred Shahian			
1963	(United States) Bernie Bukiet	(United States) Bernice Chotras			
1964	(United States) Erwin Klein	(United States) Valeri Bellini			
1965	(United States) Erwin Klein	(United States) Patty Martinez			
1966	(United States) Bernie Bukiet	(Canada) Violetta Nesukaitis			
1967	(Japan) Manji Fukushima	(United States) Patty Martinez			
1968	(United States) Lee Dal Joon	(Canada) Violetta Nesukaitis			
1969	(United States) Lee Dal Joon	(United States) Patty Martinez			
1970	(United States) Lee Dal Joon	(Canada) Violetta Nesukaitis			
1971	(United States) Lee Dal Joon	(United States) Connie Sweeris			
1972	(United States) Lee Dal Joon	(United States) Wendy Hicks			
1973	(United States) Lee Dal Joon	(Canada) Violetta Nesukaitis			
1974	(Sweden) Kjell Johansson	(Japan) Yukie Ohzeki			
1975	(Sweden) Kjell Johansson	(South Korea) Chung Hyun-Sook			
1976	(Socialist Federal Republic of Yugoslavia) Dragutin Surbek	(South Korea) Kim Soon-Ok			
1977	(Germany) Jochen Leiss	(United States) Insook Bhushan			
1978	(Japan) Norio Takashima	(South Korea) Hong Ja-Park			
1979	(Czechoslovakia) Milan Orlowski	(South Korea) Lee Ki-Won			
1980	(Sweden) Mikael Appelgren	(Japan) Kayoko Kawahigashi			
1981	(China) Xie Saike	(China) Tong Ling			
1982	(Canada) Zoran Kosanovic	(Japan) Kayoko Kawahigashi			
1983	(United States) Jeff Darwish	(United States) Lee Soo-Ja			
1984	(Chinese Taipei) Wu Wen-Chia	(Japan) Kayoko Kawahigashi			
1985	(China) Cheng Yinghua	(China) Li Huifen			
1986	(China) Teng Yi	(China) Xu Wanhua			
1987	(Sweden) Mikael Appelgren	(South Korea) Yang Young-Ja			
1988	(France) Jean-Philippe Gatien	(China) Xu Jin			
1989	(Belgium) Jean-Michel Saive	(China) Xu Jin			
1990	(Sweden) Jan-Ove Waldner	(China) Deng Yaping			
1991	(Socialist Federal Republic of Yugoslavia) Zoran Primorac	(China) Qiao Hong			
1992	(Canada) Wenguan Johnny Huang	(Hungary) Csilla Batorfi			
1993	(United States) Cheng Yinghua	(Chinese Taipei) Chen Jing			
1994	(China) Kong Linghui	(China) Gao Jun			
1995	(China) Liu Guoliang	(Canada) Geng Lijuan			
1996	(Romania) Vasile Florea	(South Korea) Lee Eun-Sil	(Austria) Karl Jindrak (Austria) Werner Schlager	(Canada) Chiu-Chen Xiaowen Barbara (Canada) Geng Lijuan	
1997	(China) Kong Linghui	(China) Wang Nan	(South Korea) Lee Chul-Seung (South Korea) Oh Sang-Eun	(South Korea) Lee Eun-Sil (South Korea) Ryu Ji-Hae	
1998	(Belgium) Jean-Michel Saive	(Luxembourg) Ni Xialian	(United States) Cheng Yinghua (Belgium) Jean-Michel Saive	(Japan) Keiko Okazaki (Japan) Aya Umemura	
1999	(Chinese Taipei) Chiang Peng-Lung	(Luxembourg) Ni Xialian	(Chinese Taipei) Chang Yen-shu (Chinese Taipei) Chiang Peng-lung	(Luxembourg) Ni Xialian (Luxembourg) Peggy Regenwetter	
2000 (Note: Also an ITTF Pro Tour Event in these years.)	(China) Wang Liqin	(China) Wang Nan	(China) Kong Linghui (China) Liu Guoliang	(Chinese Taipei) Chen Jing (Chinese Taipei) Xu Jin	
2001	(China) Liu Guozheng	(China) Niu Jianfeng	(Chinese Taipei) Chang Yen-shu (Chinese Taipei) Chiang Peng-lung	(China) Bai Yang (China) Niu Jianfeng	
2002	(China) Ma Lin	(China) Zhang Yining	(China) Kong Linghui (China) Ma Lin	(China) Li Nan (China) Zhang Yining	
2003	(Serbia and Montenegro) Aleksandar Karakašević	(Japan) Aya Umemura	(Canada) Wenguan Johnny Huang (Federal Republic of Yugoslavia) Aleksandar Karakašević	(Japan) Naoko Taniguchi (United States) Wang Chen	
2004	(South Korea) Ryu Seung-Min	(Singapore) Li Jiawei	(South Korea) Lee Chul-Seung (South Korea) Ryu Seung-Min	(Austria) Liu Jia (United States) Wang Chen	
2005	(South Korea) Oh Sang-Eun	(Singapore) Li Jiawei	(South Korea) Lee Jung-Woo (South Korea) Oh Sang-Eun	(Hong Kong) Tie Yana (Hong Kong) Zhang Rui	
2006	(Serbia) Aleksandar Karakašević	(Canada) Zhang Mo	(Federal Republic of Yugoslavia) Saša Drinić (Federal Republic of Yugoslavia) Aleksandar Karakašević	(United States) Judy Hugh (United States) Lily Yip	
2007	(Serbia) Aleksandar Karakašević	(Japan) Yuka Shiosara	(Japan) Takahiro Omori (Japan) Katsuhito Tanaka	(Japan) Satoko Kishida (Japan) Sachie Shigemoto	
2008	(Austria) Weixing Chen	(United States) Gao Jun	(Serbia) Aleksandar Karakašević (Serbia) Žolt Sel	(Japan) Sayuri Shimadaa (Japan) Miwako Ishizuka	
2009	(Slovakia) Thomas Keinath	(United States) Gao Jun	(Austria) Weixing Chen (Germany) Jörg Roßkopf	(Romania) Elizabeta Samara (Romania) Daniela Dodean	
2010	(India) Sharath Kamal	(Hungary) Georgina Pota	(China) Hao Chen (China) Xin Zhou	(Japan) Megumi Abe (Japan) Midori Ito	
2011	(Slovakia) Thomas Keinath	(United States) Liu Nai Hui	(Japan) Ryuzo Kubota (Japan) Shinya Ito	(Japan) Sayaka Nogami (Japan) Shiho Sugimoto	
2012	(Canada) Wang Zhen	(United States) Juan Liu	(South Korea) Dae Keuiv Yang (South Korea) Junhyung Ko	(United States) Liu Nai Hui (United States) Jenny Zhao	
2013 (Note: Also an ITTF World Tour Event (singles only).)	(Canada) Wang Zhen	(Japan) Megumi Abe	(Poland) Filip Szymanski (Mexico) Marcos Madrid	(Japan) Mika Tsuchida (Japan) Miki Tsuchida	(Germany) Petrissa Solja (Poland) Filip Szymanski
2014	(China) Tao Wenzhang	(Japan) Yuko Fujii	(Japan) Hidetoshi Oya (Japan) Yuya Mizuno	(Japan) Eriko Kitaoka (Japan) Riyo Nemoto	(Japan) Jin Ueda (Japan) Yuko Fujii
2015	(China) Jinxin Wang	(Japan) Miyu Maeda	(Japan) Hiromitsu Kasahara (Japan) Kohei Morimoto	(Japan) Sakura Mori (Japan) Miyu Maeda	(Japan) Takuya Jin (Japan) Yuki Matumoto
2016	(China) Wei Wang	(Puerto Rico) Adriana Díaz	(China) Bob Chen (China) Wenzhang Tao	(Japan) Takako Nagao (Japan) Yui Odono	(Japan) Ryohei Kanoya (Japan) Yui Odono
2017	(Japan) Arinobu Taimu	(Japan) Shoji Yuki			
2018	(Canada) Eugene Wang	(United States) Juan Liu			
2019	(Japan) Kentaro Miuchi	(United States) Lily Zhang			
2021	(Ukraine) Kou Lei	(United States) Lily Zhang			
2022	(Ukraine) Kou Lei	(United States) Amy Wang			
2023	(United States) Ma Jinbao	(United States) Amy Wang			
2024	(United States) Kanak Jha	(China) Guo Yan			

gray = Not Played
white = results not known or yet researched
∗ The Mixed Doubles played at the 2003 U.S. Open was a delayed closed event. See the 2002 U.S. Nationals results below.
