= 1947 World Table Tennis Championships – Men's singles =

1947 Men's singles
- Location: Paris

The 1947 World Table Tennis Championships men's singles was the 14th edition of the men's singles championship.

Bohumil Váňa defeated Ferenc Sidó in the final, winning three sets to nil to secure the title.

== Results ==
Round of 16
(Czechoslovakia) Alojzy Ehrlich	3
(France) Robert Bailleul	0
(United States) Lou Pagliaro	3
(France) Guy Amouretti	1
(Hungary) Ferenc Sidó	3
(Czechoslovakia) Ladislav Štípek	0
(France) Michel Haguenauer	3
(England) Ernest Bubley	1
(Czechoslovakia) Bohumil Váňa	3
(Czechoslovakia) Josef Turnovský	0
(Hungary) Ferenc Soos	3
(United States) William Holzrichter	1
(England) Johnny Leach	3
(Czechoslovakia) Václav Tereba	1
(England) Jack Carrington	3
(Hungary) Geza Eros	1

Quarterfinals
(Poland) Erlich	3
(United States) Pagliaro	0
(Hungary) Sidó	3
(France) Haguenauer	1
(Czechoslovakia) Váňa	3
(Hungary) Soos	0
(England) Leach	3
(England) Carrington	0

Semifinals
(United States) Pagliaro	13	21	7	20
(Hungary) Sidó	21	17	21	22
(Czechoslovakia) Váňa	21	19	22	21
(England) Leach	10	21	20	16

Final
(Hungary) Sidó	20	14	9
(Czechoslovakia) Váňa	21+	21	21

+ Time limit rule

== See also ==
List of World Table Tennis Championships medalists
