= 1949 World Table Tennis Championships – Men's singles =

1949 Men's singles

The 1949 World Table Tennis Championships men's singles was the 16th edition of the men's singles championship.

Johnny Leach defeated Bohumil Váňa in the final, winning three sets to two to secure the title.

== Results ==
Round of 16
(England) Richard Bergmann	0
(Hungary) Ferenc Soos	3
(Austria) Heribert Just	1
(Socialist Federal Republic of Yugoslavia) Tibor Harangozo	3
(England) Johnny Leach	3
(Hungary) Ferenc Sidó	1
(United States) Dick Miles	3
(Czechoslovakia) František Tokár	0
(Czechoslovakia) Bohumil Váňa	3
(Socialist Federal Republic of Yugoslavia) Vilim Harangozo	0
(France) Guy Amouretti	3
(Poland) Alojzy Ehrlich	2
(United States) Marty Reisman	3
(Czechoslovakia) Max Marinko	1
(Czechoslovakia) Ivan Andreadis	3
(Hungary) László Várkonyi	0

Quarterfinals
(Hungary) Soos	21	21	16	21
(Socialist Federal Republic of Yugoslavia) Harangozo	12	15	21	14
(England) Leach	22	13	21	12	24
(United States) Miles	20	21	18	21	22
(Czechoslovakia) Váňa	21	14	12	21	21
(France) Amouretti	19	21	21	15	8
(United States) Reisman	21	21	21
(Czechoslovakia) Andreadis	16	13	17

Semifinals
(Hungary) Soos	12	20	21	21	18
(England) Leach	21	22	18	11	20+
(Czechoslovakia) Váňa	23	21	21
(United States) Reisman	21	18	10

Final
(England) Leach	21	11	17	21	21
(Czechoslovakia) Váňa	19	21	21	14	16

+ Time limit rule applied

== See also ==
List of World Table Tennis Championships medalists
