= Rudolf Diwald =

Austrian table tennis player

Personal information
- Nationality: Austria
- Born: 22 July 1921
- Died: October 1952 (aged 31)
Medal record
Representing Austria
World Table Tennis Championships
Bronze medal – third place	1948	Men's team

Rudolf Diwald was a male Austrian international table tennis player.

He won a bronze medal at the 1948 World Table Tennis Championships in the Swaythling Cup with Heinrich Bednar, Otto Eckl, Heribert Just and Herbert Wunsch.

== See also ==
- List of table tennis players
- List of World Table Tennis Championships medalists
