= Adoni Maropis =

Greek-American actor

- Born: July 20, 1963 (age 63); Pittsburgh, Pennsylvania, U.S.
- Occupation: Actor
- Years active: 1996–present

Adoni Maropis /əˈdɒni məˈroʊpɪs/ (born July 20, 1963) is an American actor.

== Personal life ==
Maropis was born in Pittsburgh, Pennsylvania, the middle of three sons. He is a table tennis player, preferring the "orthodox styles" of hardbat and sandpaper table tennis. As of July 2012 he holds titles as world and US champion for sandpaper table tennis and also won the hardbat class of the US championship in 2011. Maropis is currently working on a feature film project entitled The Last Palikari written by himself and his father, Petro Maropis. A short version of the project was completed in 2012 with Vertex Media in Los Angeles, CA.

== Career ==
Maropis is best known for playing Quan Chi in Mortal Kombat: Conquest and the antagonist Abu Fayed in the sixth season of 24.

In film, he appeared as a recalcitrant general in 2002's The Scorpion King, an officer in service to Brian Cox's Agamemnon in 2004's Troy and the falconer Sakr in Hidalgo, released the same year. On television, in addition to his appearances on 24, Maropis played an assassin in the season three premiere of Chuck and had an uncredited role as Captain Maroudis on The Last Ship. In addition to his role as Quan Chi in a Mortal Kombat adaptation, his other video game performances include the doomed General Hassan in Command and Conquer: Tiberian Sun and background voice work for multiple other Command and Conquer games.

== Filmography ==
Year	Title	Role	Notes
1997	I'm Watching You	Warren	
1997	A Doll in the Dark	Salvatore	
1998	Sheer Passion	Paolo	
1999	Mortal Kombat: Conquest	Quan Chi	4 episodes
1999	American Born	Revolutionary	
2000	Walker Texas Ranger	Gazal	Episode: "Vision Quest"
2000	Escape Under Pressure	First Mate	
2000	Passion Cove	Matt	Episode: "The Getaway"
2000	Surrender	Bernie	
2001	Angel	Rebel Leader	2 episodes
2001	The Gristle	Louis	
2002	The Scorpion King	Doubting General	
2002	Bad Company	Jarma / Dragan henchman #1	
2004	Hidalgo	Sakr	
2004	Close Call	Pimp	
2004	Troy	Agamemnon's Officer	
2004	The Deviants	Amir	
2005	Venus On The Halfshell	Bones	
2006	Francis Hamper	Epic the cab driver	
2007	24	Abu Fayed	15 episodes
2008	Criminal Minds	Ben Abner	Episode: "Mayhem"
2008-2009	CSI: NY	Sebastian Diakos	2 episodes
2010	Chuck	Javier	Episode: "Chuck Versus the Pink Slip"
2010	Beautysleep Symphony	EuroMan	
2010	Pair of Kings	The Oracle	Episode: "Journey to the Center of Mt. Spew"
2015	Lazarus Rising	Mr. Gray	
2016	Dream of a Shadow	Yianni	
2016	King Saud	Prince Usef	
