= 1949 World Table Tennis Championships – Men's team =

1949 Swaythling Cup (men's team)

The 1949 World Table Tennis Championships – Swaythling Cup (men's team) was the 16th edition of the men's team championship.

Hungary won the gold medal defeating Czechoslovakia 5–4 in the final. England and the United States both won bronze medals by virtue of finishing second in their groups.

== Medalists ==
=== Team ===
Event	Gold	Silver	Bronze
Men's team	Hungary; József Kóczián; Ferenc Sidó; Ferenc Soos; László Várkonyi	Czechoslovakia; Ivan Andreadis; Max Marinko; Ladislav Štípek; František Tokár; Bohumil Váňa	England; Viktor Barna; Richard Bergmann; Johnny Leach; Ronald Sharman; Aubrey Simons
Men's team	Hungary; József Kóczián; Ferenc Sidó; Ferenc Soos; László Várkonyi	Czechoslovakia; Ivan Andreadis; Max Marinko; Ladislav Štípek; František Tokár; Bohumil Váňa	United States; Douglas Cartland; James McClure; Richard Miles; Marty Reisman

== Swaythling Cup tables ==
=== Group 1 ===
Pos	Team	P	W	L	Pts
1	Hungary	7	7	0	7
2	United States	7	6	1	6
3	France	7	5	2	5
4	(Sweden) Yugoslavia	7	4	3	4
5	Wales	7	3	4	3
6	Luxembourg	7	2	5	2
7	Norway	7	1	6	1
8	Finland	7	0	7	0

+ Poland and Egypt both withdrew from Group 1

=== Group 2 ===
Pos	Team	P	W	L	Pts
1	Czechoslovakia	9	9	0	9
2	England	9	8	1	8
3	Sweden	9	7	2	7
4	Austria	9	6	3	6
5	Netherlands	9	5	4	5
6	Italy	9	4	5	4
7	Switzerland	9	3	6	3
8	Brazil	9	2	7	2
9	Denmark	9	1	8	1
10	Scotland	9	0	9	0

== Final ==
Hungary 5		Czechoslovakia 4	Score
Kóczián	bt	Štípek	21 -13 15-21 21–16
Kóczián	bt	Andreadis	21-18 21–16
Kóczián	lost to	Váňa	21-19 9-21 19–21
Soos	lost to	Andreadis	15-21 7-21
Soos	lost to	Váňa	12-21 11–21
Soos	bt	Štípek	16-21 21-12 21–17
Sidó	lost to	Váňa	19-21 21-16 20–22
Sidó	bt	Štípek	20-22 21-18 21–18
Sidó	bt	Andreadis	21-16 18-21 21–11

== See also ==
- List of World Table Tennis Championships medalists
