= Loretta Gyorgy =

Hungarian table tennis player

Personal information
- Nationality: Hungary
Medal record
Representing Hungary
World Table Tennis Championships
| Silver medal – second place | 1948 | Women's team |

Loretta Gyorgy is a female former Hungarian international table tennis player.

She won a silver medal during the 1948 World Table Tennis Championships in the Corbillon Cup for Hungary. The team consisted of Gizi Farkas, Béláné Vermes and Rozsi Karpati.

== See also ==
- List of World Table Tennis Championships medalists
