= Iván Martín =

Iván Martín or Ivan Martin may refer to:

- Iván Martín (footballer, born 1995), Spanish football forward
- Iván Martín (footballer, born 1999), Spanish football midfielder
- Ivan Martin (actor), American actor; co-writer and star of Loitering with Intent
- Ivan Martin (table tennis), Irish table tennis player; see 1947 World Table Tennis Championships – Men's team
