= Douglas Cartland =

Douglas Cartland may refer to:

- Douglas Cartland (Silent Hill), a video game character
- Douglas Cartland (table tennis) (1914–?), American table tennis player
