= Dal Joon Lee =

Dal Joon Lee (May 30, 1939 in Wonju, South Korea – September 19, 2010) was an American table tennis player. He participated in four world championships in the 1960s and 1970s and won six consecutive U.S. Open Table Tennis Championships.

== Career ==
Dal Joon Lee began playing table tennis at the age of 8, after watching his older brothers and sisters. During the Korean War, his father, two brothers and a sister were killed. He continued playing table tennis soon after and, through intensive training, became a skilled player. He won the Korean Championship consecutively between 1960 and 1964.

He began playing professionally under the flag of South Korea. In 1960, he competed in the Asian Championships, where he came second in the men's singles tournament, losing to the Japanese player, Ichiro Ogimura. Previously in the competition, he had won victories against Japan's Nobuya Hoshino (then 16th in the world rankings) and Teruo Murakami (WRL 4th place).

At the Asian Games in 1962, he reached the final in the team competition. In 1964, he became the national South Korean champion. He then emigrated to the US.

In the mid-1960s, he performed in exhibition games along with Richard Bergmann for the Harlem Globetrotters.

From 1968 to 1973, Lee won the U.S. Open Table Tennis Championships six times in a row. Between 1969 and 1975, he was nominated for all four World Championships, but never came close to medal ranks.

In the season of 1977/78 he was an active player in Germany for the sports team TSV Selk.

In 1983, he was inducted into the Table Tennis Hall of Fame of the USA.

== Personal life ==
Dal Joon Lee married Linda Williams in 1967. They had a son together in 1968. In 1975, he entered into a second marriage with the South Korean table tennis player, He-Ja, who played in the mid-1970s at the German Bundesliga club TSV Kronshagen and participated in the 1979 World Table Tennis Championships. From this marriage, Lee had three children.

On September 19, 2010, Lee died of bile duct cancer at the age of 71.

== Statistics from ITTF database ==
Association	event	year	place	country	singles	doubles	Mixed	team
United States	Asian Championship TTFA	1960	Bombay	IND	silver			
United States	Asian Games	1962	Jakarta	INA		5		2
United States	World Championships	1975	Calcutta	IND	last 128	torment	torment	19
United States	World Championships	1973	Sarajevo	YUG	last 128	last 32	torment	17
United States	World Championships	1971	Nagoya	JPN	last 64	last 32	last 64	28
United States	World Championships	1969	Munich	FRG	last 128	last 32	torment	18

== Literature ==
Olaf Brockmann: Guests from South Korea, DTS Magazine, 1977/21 Issue North-East Page 6
