= George Goodman (table tennis) =

British table tennis player

George 'Eli' Goodman
Personal information
- Nationality: England

George 'Eli' Goodman is a former male English international table tennis player.

He was part of the England team that competed at the 1947 World Table Tennis Championships in the Swaythling Cup (men's team event) with Ernest Bubley, Eric Filby, Benny Casofsky and Johnny Leach.

He was first capped against Wales in 1946 and represented Manchester in national competitions.

He was of Jewish descent and won a gold medal for England at the Jewish Maccabiah Games in 1950 with Benny Casofsky.

== See also ==
- List of England players at the World Team Table Tennis Championships
- List of World Table Tennis Championships medalists
