= Benny Casofsky =

British table tennis player

Personal information
- Nationality: England
- Born: 19 June 1919
- Died: 15 April 1987 (aged 67)

Bernard "Benny" Casofsky (19 June 1919 – 15 April 1987), was a former male English international table tennis player.

“Benny” was part of the England team that competed at the 1947 World Table Tennis Championships in the Swaythling Cup (men's team event) with Ernest Bubley, Eric Filby, George 'Eli' Goodman and Johnny Leach.

He was of Jewish descent and was part of the Manchester team along with Leslie Cohen and Hyman Lurie who won the Wilmott Cup (National Team Championship) on three occasions. He was also later ranked as Manchester’s number one player.

Later, he was named the president of the Manchester and District League.

== See also ==
- List of England players at the World Team Table Tennis Championships
- List of World Table Tennis Championships medalists
