= Pinkie Barnes =

British table tennis player

Personal information
- Nationality: England
- Born: Lavender Rosamund Marguerite Barnes; 18 April 1915
- Died: 14 September 2012 (aged 97)
- Spouse: Sam Kydd (m. 1952; died 1982)
- Children: Jonathan Kydd
Medal record
Representing England
World Table Tennis Championships
Silver medal – second place	1949	Women's Team
Silver medal – second place	1949	Women's Doubles

Lavender Rosamund Marguerite "Pinkie" Barnes (18 April 1915 – 14 September 2012) was an English international table tennis champion.

Barnes did not like the short forms of any of her three Christian names and was keen to be called by a nickname; "Pinkie" apparently derived from her babyhood complexion.

She played for England eleven times between 1946 and 1950 and won various trophies, including the Championship of the Netherlands. She was doubles finalist winning a silver medal at the 1949 World Table Tennis Championships with Joan Crosby; they lost in the final to the then World Champion, Hungary's Gizi Farkas and Scot Helen Elliot. She won another silver medal as part of the women's team consisting of Joan Crosby, Margaret Franks, and Adele Wood.

Barnes was considered particularly glamorous among sports personalities of the late 1940s.

In 1952, she married the actor Sam Kydd; their son is the actor Jonathan Kydd. Following her marriage, Pinkie became an advertising copywriter, working for Masius & Ferguson. She was one of the first women in the UK to hold such a position.

== See also ==
- List of England players at the World Team Table Tennis Championships
- List of World Table Tennis Championships medalists
