= Éva Anderlik =

Hungarian table tennis player

Personal information
- Nationality: Hungary
Medal record
Representing Hungary
World Table Tennis Championships
Silver medal – second place	1947	Women's team

Éva Anderlik is a former female Hungarian international table tennis player.

She won a silver medal during the 1947 World Table Tennis Championships in the Corbillon Cup for Hungary. The team consisted of Gizi Farkas, Béláné Vermes and Rozsi Karpati.

She was the singles runner-up during the 1946 Hungarian Table Tennis Championships.

== See also ==
- List of World Table Tennis Championships medalists
