= Irene Lentle =

British table tennis player

'Rene' Lentle
Personal information
- Nationality: England
- Born: 24 March 1912
- Died: 2003 (aged 90–91)
Medal record
Representing England
World Table Tennis Championships
Bronze medal – third place	1948	Women's Doubles

Irene Mary 'Rene' Lentle (née Cox) (24 March 1912 – 2003) was a female English international table tennis player.

== Table tennis career ==
She won a bronze medal at the 1948 World Table Tennis Championships in the women's doubles with Audrey Fowler.

== Personal life ==
She married in 1938.

== See also ==
- List of table tennis players
- List of World Table Tennis Championships medalists
