= Josee Wouters =

Belgian table tennis player

Personal information
- Nationality: Belgium
Medal record
Representing Belgium
World Table Tennis Championships
Bronze medal – third place	1947	Women's doubles

Josee Wouters was an international table tennis player from Belgium.

Wouters won a bronze medal at the 1947 World Table Tennis Championships in the women's doubles with Mary Detournay.

== See also ==
- List of table tennis players
- List of World Table Tennis Championships medalists
