= Hardbat =

Table tennis playing style

Hardbat table tennis is the classical table tennis playing style that existed before the advent of sponge rubber in the 1950s. The primary difference between hardbat and modern table tennis lies in the racket used, which significantly impacts the game's dynamics and strategy. Hardbat rackets use short outward "pips" with no sponge, resulting in decreased speeds and reduced spin compared to rackets using sponge rubber. This results in slower shots and a more strategic game rather than the fast-paced, heavy topspin attacking style that dominates modern table tennis. Although the older term 'ping-pong' is often used as a synonym for table tennis in general, hardbat is sometimes referred to specifically as 'ping-pong' in contradistinction to modern 'soft-bat' (i.e., sponge bat) table tennis.

Hardbat play has been resurgent, with national championships contested yearly in the United States, and a World Championship of Ping Pong since 2011. A table tennis tournament using standardised hardbats was promoted by Matchroom Sport at Alexandra Palace in January 2013. It was won by Maxim Shmyrev.

The American Marty Reisman became the oldest person ever to win an open national competition in a racquet sport when he won the 1997 United States National Hardbat championship at age 67.

== See also ==
- Table tennis terminology
