= Adele Wood =

British table tennis player (1932–2024)

Personal information
- Nationality: England
- Born: 1932 Manchester, England
- Died: 30 May 2024 (aged 92)
Medal record
Representing England
World Table Tennis Championships
Silver medal – second place	1949	Women's Team

Adele Wood (1932 – 30 May 2024) was an English international table tennis player.

== Biography ==
Wood was born in Manchester, England in 1932. She won a silver medal at the 1949 World Table Tennis Championships in the Corbillon Cup (women's team event) with Pinkie Barnes, Joan Crosby and Peggy Franks for England.

She played her last representative match in 1958, after marrying Len Pettifer. Wood died on 30 May 2024, at the age of 92.

== See also ==
- List of England players at the World Team Table Tennis Championships
- List of World Table Tennis Championships medalists
