= Passion Cove =

- Genre: Comedy; Erotic anthology drama
- Written by: Christopher Byrne; David Keith Miller; Karen O'Hara; John Quinn; Scarlett Rowe; Leland Zaitz
- Directed by: Robert Kubilos; Carlton McRae; Leland Price; John Quinn; Carrington Stark
- Starring: Caroline Ambrose; Jason Stark; Anthony Auriemma
- Composers: John Boegehold; Chris Carlson
- Country of origin: United States
- Original language: English
- No. of seasons: 2
- No. of episodes: 26

Production
- Executive producers: Richard Bencivengo; John Quinn
- Producer: Brian Glazen
- Cinematography: Andrea V. Rossotto; Harris Done
- Editors: Mo David; Ira Garden; Dan Tivi; Eric Torres
- Running time: 28 minutes
- Production companies: Alta Loma Entertainment; HBO Entertainment

Original release
- Network: Cinemax
- Release: March 3, 2000 – April 27, 2001

Passion Cove is an erotic anthology drama series which featured softcore sexual encounters and aired from March 2000 to April 2001 on Cinemax.

== Summary ==
In each episode, guest stars rent the beach house in a fictional seaside resort Passion Cove, usually for a weekend and magically find love where they were looking for lust. The beach house has a backyard swimming pool and adjacent beach that provide continuity to the 26 episodes.

Series star Caroline Ambrose appears periodically as Samantha, the property's rental agent, but plays no role in the individual stories.

== Episodes ==
=== Season 1 ===
1. "The Vibe" – March 3, 2000
2. "In Too Deep" – March 10, 2000
3. "Lights! Camera! Action!" – March 17, 2000
4. "Blind Date" – March 24, 2000
5. "Payday" – March 31, 2000
6. "Behind the Scenes" – April 7, 2000
7. "The Gift" – April 14, 2000
8. "The Getaway" – April 21, 2000
9. "Lost Cowboy" – April 28, 2000
10. "Music of Lust" – May 5, 2000
11. "Rising Stars" – May 12, 2000
12. "Sorority Reunion" – May 19, 2000
13. "Watching Linda" – May 26, 2000

=== Season 2 ===
1. "Ten Years Later" – February 2, 2001
2. "Enchanted Weekend" – February 9, 2001
3. "The Bet" – February 16, 2001
4. "Practice What You Preach" – February 23, 2001
5. "House Call" – March 2, 2001
6. "Over By Sunday" – March 9, 2001
7. "Where Have You Been All My Life?" – March 16, 2001
8. "The Surrogate" – March 23, 2001
9. "Silent Night" – March 30, 2001
10. "Best Friends" – April 6, 2001
11. "Ghostly Passion" – April 13, 2001
12. "Discreet Affair" – April 20, 2001
13. "The Best Revenge" – April 27, 2001

== In popular culture ==
In the 2007 episode "Chuck Versus the Alma Mater" of the comedy spy programme Chuck, the possibility of playing Passion Cove on every TV in an electronics store is uttered as a threat.
