= Eugène Manchiska =

French table tennis player

Personal information
- Nationality: France
Medal record
Representing France
World Table Tennis Championships
Silver medal – second place	1948	Men's team

Eugène Manchiska is a French former international table tennis player.

Manchiska won a silver medal at the 1948 World Table Tennis Championships in the Swaythling Cup with Guy Amouretti, Maurice Bordrez, Charles Dubouillé and Michel Haguenauer.

== See also ==
- List of table tennis players
- List of World Table Tennis Championships medalists
