= Johann Hartwich =

Austrian table tennis player

Personal information
- Nationality: Austria
Medal record
Representing Austria
World Table Tennis Championships
Bronze medal – third place	1947	Men's team

Johann Hartwich was a male Austrian international table tennis player.

He won a bronze medal at the 1947 World Table Tennis Championships in the Swaythling Cup (men's team event).

== See also ==
- List of table tennis players
- List of World Table Tennis Championships medalists
