= Despina Mavrocordat =

Romanian table tennis player

Personal information
- Nationality: Romania
- Born: 30 November 1917 Iași
- Died: 2014 (aged 96–97)
Medal record
Representing Romania
World Table Tennis Championships
| Bronze medal – third place | 1948 | Women's team |

Maria 'Despina' Mavrocordat (1917–2014), married name Sayn-Wittgenstein, was a female Romanian international table tennis, volleyball and basketball player.

== Table tennis career ==
She won a bronze medal during the 1948 World Table Tennis Championships in the Corbillon Cup for Romania. The team consisted of Sari Szász-Kolozsvári, Angelica Rozeanu and G Beca.

== Personal life ==
Born into an old noble Mavrokordato family, she graduated from the Faculty of Law and Science. She was chairman of the Romanian Tennis Table Federation and emigrated to Germany. Despina married into the House of Sayn-Wittgenstein.

== See also ==
- List of World Table Tennis Championships medalists
