= Audrey Fowler =

English table tennis player

Personal information
- Nationality: England
Medal record
Representing England
World Table Tennis Championships
Bronze medal – third place	1948	Women's doubles

Audrey Fowler was a female English international table tennis player.

She won a bronze medal at the 1948 World Table Tennis Championships in the women's doubles with Irene Lentle.

== See also ==
- List of table tennis players
- List of World Table Tennis Championships medalists
