= Erzsébet Mezei =

Hungarian table tennis player

Personal information
- Nationality: Hungary
Medal record
Representing Hungary
World Table Tennis Championships
Bronze medal – third place	1949	Women's doubles
Bronze medal – third place	1949	Women's team

Erzsébet Mezei was a female Hungarian international table tennis player.

== Table tennis career ==
She won two bronze medals at the 1949 World Table Tennis Championships in the women's doubles with Rozsi Karpati and in the women's team.

== See also ==
- List of table tennis players
- List of World Table Tennis Championships medalists
