= Mary Detournay =

Belgian table tennis player

Personal information
- Nationality: Belgium
Medal record
Representing Belgium
World Table Tennis Championships
Bronze medal – third place	1947	Women's doubles

Mary Detournay (married name Stevens), was a female international table tennis player from Belgium.

She won a bronze medal at the 1947 World Table Tennis Championships in the women's doubles with Josee Wouters.

She won six Belgian titles between 1937 and 1952.

== See also ==
- List of table tennis players
- List of World Table Tennis Championships medalists
