= Douglas Cartland (table tennis) =

American table tennis player (1914–2002)

Personal information
- Nationality: United States
- Born: 20 July 1914 Greensboro, North Carolina
- Died: 29 July 2002 (aged 88)
Medal record
Representing United States
World Table Tennis Championships
Bronze medal – third place	1949	Men's Doubles
Bronze medal – third place	1949	Men's Team
Bronze medal – third place	1952	Men's Doubles

Edwin Douglas Cartland (July 20, 1914 - July 29, 2002) was a male United States international table tennis player.

He won three bronze medals at the World Table Tennis Championships; two at the 1949 World Table Tennis Championships in the men's team and in the men's doubles with Dick Miles. His third bronze came in 1952 at the 1952 World Table Tennis Championships in the men's doubles with Marty Reisman.

After Cartland and Reisman received a bronze medal, they spent months playing matches in Asia in order to raise funds to travel back to Japan and get a rematch.

He was inducted into the US Table Tennis Hall of Fame in 1984 and in 1953 the Barnes Sports Library published his book called 'Table Tennis Illustrated'.

== See also ==
- List of table tennis players
- List of World Table Tennis Championships medalists
