= Alex Agopoff =

French table tennis player

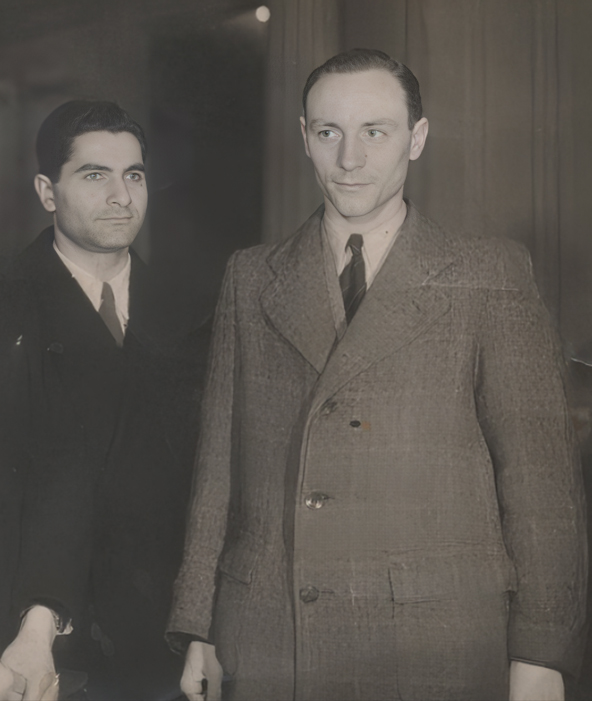
- Alex Agopoff (on the left) and Eugène Bouchard

Personal information
- Nationality: France
- Born: 25 May 1918 Istanbul
- Died: 25 August 2009 (aged 91) Paris
Medal record
Representing France
World Table Tennis Championships
Bronze medal – third place	1947	Men's team
Bronze medal – third place	1950	Men's team

Alexandre Agopoff (1918-2009), was a male French international table tennis player.

== Career ==
At the beginning of his table tennis career, he won the French Championship during the German occupation, defeating the Lille-born player Eugène Bouchard, Champion of Flanders, in the final.

He won a bronze medal at the 1947 World Table Tennis Championships in the Swaythling Cup (men's team event). Three years later he won a second bronze at the 1950 World Table Tennis Championships in the Swaythling Cup.

Agopoff won eleven titles at national French championships, 1945 in singles, 1939, 1939, 1945 and 1947 in doubles and 1939, 1946, 1949-1951 and 1957 in mixed.

== See also ==
- List of table tennis players
- List of World Table Tennis Championships medalists
