= William Price (table tennis) =

American table tennis player

Bill Price
Personal information
- Nationality: United States
- Born: 1915 St. Louis
Medal record
Representing United States
World Table Tennis Championships
Bronze medal – third place	1948	Men's Team

William Price was a male United States international table tennis player.

He won a bronze medal at the 1948 World Table Tennis Championships in the men's team event.

He was inducted into the USA Table Tennis Hall of Fame in 1980.

== See also ==
- List of table tennis players
- List of World Table Tennis Championships medalists
