= Herbert Wunsch =

Austrian table tennis player

Personal information
- Nationality: Austria
- Born: 23 February 1917 Vienna
- Died: 24 December 1970 (aged 53) Vienna
Medal record
Representing Austria
World Table Tennis Championships
Bronze medal – third place	1948	Men's doubles
Bronze medal – third place	1948	Men's team

Herbert Wunsch (1917-1970), was a male Austrian international table tennis player.

He won two bronze medals at the 1948 World Table Tennis Championships in the men's team event and in the men's doubles with Heinrich Bednar.

== See also ==
- List of table tennis players
- List of World Table Tennis Championships medalists
