= Maurice Bordrez =

French table tennis player

Personal information
- Nationality: France
Medal record
Representing France
World Table Tennis Championships
Bronze medal – third place	1947	Men's team
Silver medal – second place	1948	Men's team

Maurice Bordrez is a French former international table tennis player.

Bordrez won a bronze medal at the 1947 World Table Tennis Championships in the Swaythling Cup (men's team event). The following year he won a silver medal at the 1948 World Table Tennis Championships in the Swaythling Cup.

Bordrez was the French National champion in 1939 and 1946.

== See also ==
- List of table tennis players
- List of World Table Tennis Championships medalists
