= Jeanne Delay =

French table tennis player (1920–2012)

Personal information
- Nationality: France
- Born: 18 May 1920
- Died: 6 October 2012 (aged 92)
Medal record
Representing France
World Table Tennis Championships
| Bronze medal – third place | 1949 | Women's Team |

Jeanne Delay (18 May 1920 – 6 October 2012) was a French female international table tennis player.

Delay won a bronze medal at the 1949 World Table Tennis Championships in the Corbillon Cup (women's team event) with Huguette Béolet and Yolande Vannoni for France.

Delay also won five French national titles from 1937 to 1949 which included four singles titles.

== See also ==
- List of table tennis players
- List of World Table Tennis Championships medalists
