= Reba Monness =

American table tennis player

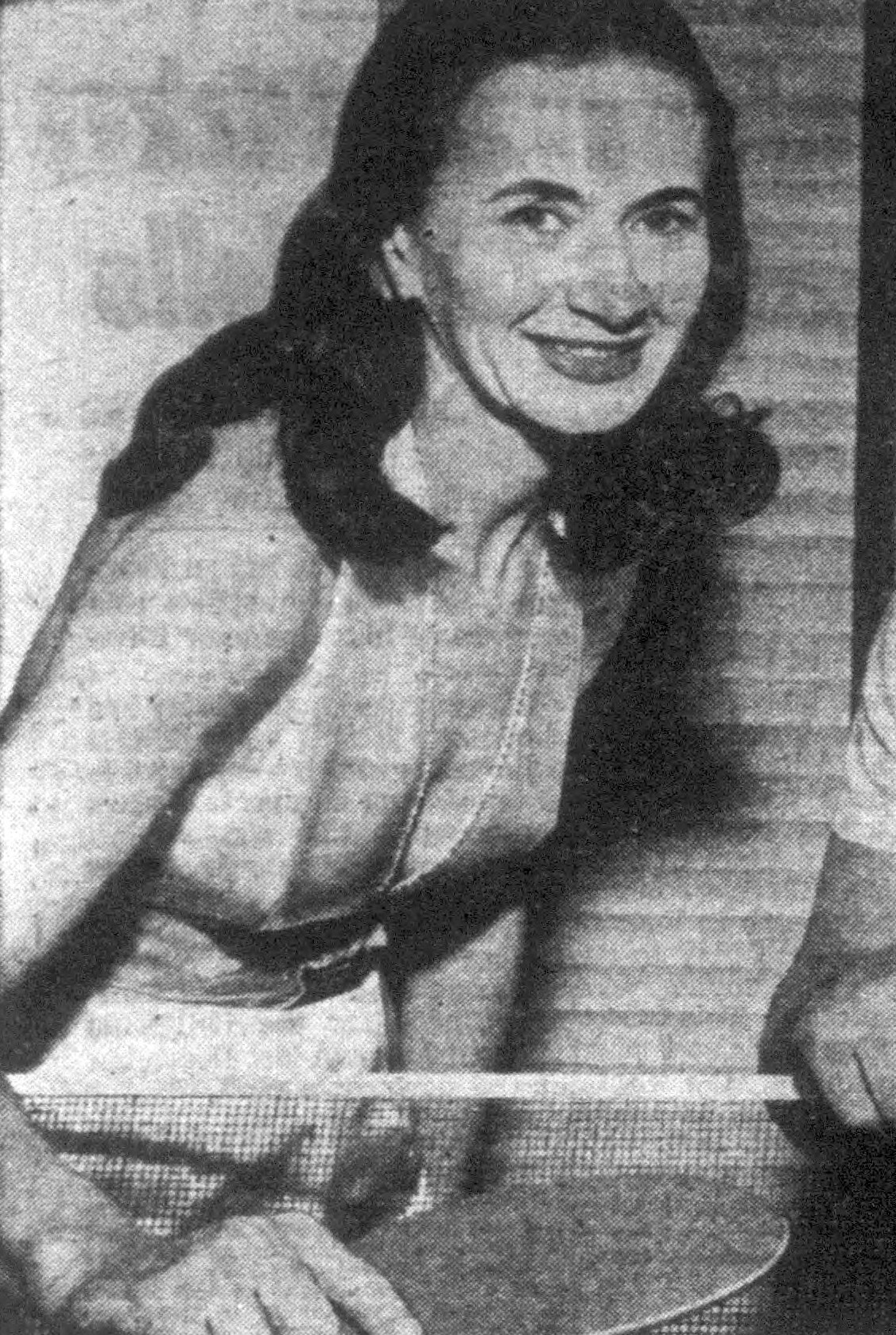
- Monness in 1953

Personal information
- Nationality: United States
- Born: 3 February 1911
- Died: 10 May 1980 (aged 69) New York
Medal record
Representing United States
World Table Tennis Championships
Bronze medal – third place	1947	Team
Silver medal – second place	1947	Doubles

Reba Kirson Monness was a female United States international table tennis player.

She won a bronze medal at the 1947 World Table Tennis Championships in the women's team and a silver medal in the women's doubles with Mae Clouther.

She competed in the 1950 Maccabiah Games in Israel.

She was inducted into the USA Table Tennis Hall of Fame in 1981.

== See also ==
- List of table tennis players
- List of World Table Tennis Championships medalists
