= Elizabeth Steventon =

British table tennis player

Betty Steventon
Personal information
- Nationality: England
- Born: 1912
Medal record
Representing England
World Table Tennis Championships
Gold medal – first place	1948	team

Elizabeth Steventon was a former female international table tennis player from England.

== Table tennis career ==
She was a member of the English winning team in the 1948 World Table Tennis Championships known as the Corbillon Cup.

== See also ==
- List of England players at the World Team Table Tennis Championships
- List of table tennis players
- List of World Table Tennis Championships medalists
