= Joan Crosby =

English table tennis player (1920–2013)

Personal information
- Nationality: England
- Born: Joan Sophie Brock; 1920 Exeter, Devon, England
- Died: 2013 (aged 92–93) Devon, England
Medal record
Representing England
World Table Tennis Championships
Silver medal – second place	1949	Women's Team
Silver medal – second place	1949	Women's Doubles

Joan Sophie Crosby (née Brock; 1920–2013) was an English international table tennis player.

== Table tennis career ==
Crosby won double silver at the 1949 World Table Tennis Championships in the women's team event and the women's doubles with Pinkie Barnes.

== Personal life ==
Joan Brock married Donald "Driver" Peter Crosby in Exeter in September 1940. She died in Devon in 2013.

== See also ==
- List of England players at the World Team Table Tennis Championships
- List of World Table Tennis Championships medalists
