= Josef Turnovský =

Czech table tennis player (born 1922)

Personal information
- Nationality: Czech Republic
- Born: 1922 (age 103–104)
Medal record
Representing Czechoslovakia
World Table Tennis Championships
Bronze medal – third place	1950	Men's Doubles

Josef Turnovský (born 1922) was a Czech international table tennis player.

Turnovský won a bronze medal at the 1950 World Table Tennis Championships in the men's doubles with Václav Tereba.

Turnovský was a worker at the Stalin Works at Horni Litvínov.

== See also ==
- List of table tennis players
- List of World Table Tennis Championships medalists
