= Jack Carrington =

English table tennis player

Personal information
- Nationality: England
- Born: 1909
- Died: 1984 (aged 74–75)
Medal record
Representing England
World Table Tennis Championships
Silver medal – second place	1947	Men's Doubles
Bronze medal – third place	1951	Men's Doubles

Jack Carrington (1909–1984) was a male English international table tennis player.

== Table tennis career ==
He won a silver medal at the 1947 World Table Tennis Championships in the men's doubles with Johnny Leach. Four years later he won a bronze medal at the 1951 World Table Tennis Championships in the men's doubles with Leach.

He also won an English Open title.

== Personal life ==
He married fellow international Elsie Weaver.

After retiring from playing he worked as head coach of the English Table Tennis Association ETTA and Director of Coaching. He organized national and international tournament events and ensured especially in the schools for the promotion of table tennis. In 1959 he coached the Germany national team.

== See also ==
- List of table tennis players
- List of World Table Tennis Championships medalists
