= Davida Hawthorn =

American table tennis player

Personal information
- Nationality: United States
- Born: 1918 (age 107–108)
Medal record
Representing United States
World Table Tennis Championships
Bronze medal – third place	1947	Doubles
Bronze medal – third place	1947	Team
Bronze medal – third place	1947	Mixed Doubles

Davida Hawthorn was a United States international table tennis player. She was from New York.

She won a three bronze medals at the 1947 World Table Tennis Championships in the women's team, women's doubles with Lea Thall-Neuberger and mixed doubles with William Holzrichter.

She was inducted into the USA Table Tennis Hall of Fame in 1994 and was the 1945 US champion.

== See also ==
- List of table tennis players
- List of World Table Tennis Championships medalists
