= Yolande Vannoni =

French table tennis player (1923–2016)

Yolande Vannoni (née Logelin)
Personal information
- Nationality: France
- Born: 11 June 1923 Château-Renault, France
- Died: September 2016 (aged 93)
Medal record
Representing France
World Table Tennis Championships
Bronze medal – third place	1949	Women's Team

Yolande Vannoni (née Logelin, 11 June 1923 – September 2016) was a French female international table tennis player.

Vannoni won a bronze medal at the 1949 World Table Tennis Championships in the Corbillon Cup (women's team event) with Huguette Béolet and Jeanne Delay for France.

Vannoni also won six French national titles from 1943 to 1953 which included four singles titles.

== See also ==
- List of table tennis players
- List of World Table Tennis Championships medalists
