= Elizabeth Blackbourn =

British table tennis player

Personal information
- Full name: Blackbourn Elizabeth
- Nationality: England
- Born: 1924
- Died: 27 August 1999 (aged 74–75)

Sport
- Sport: Table tennis
Medal record
Women's table tennis
Representing England
World Championships
| Silver medal – second place | 1947 Wembley | Singles |
| Gold medal – first place | 1947 Wembley | Team |

Elizabeth Blackbourn was a female international table tennis player from England.

== Table tennis career ==
She was a member of the winning team in the 1947 World Table Tennis Championships. In addition she won a silver medal in the singles. She also won an English Open title.

== Personal life ==
In 1948 she lived in South Africa and later won their National Championships.

== See also ==
- List of England players at the World Team Table Tennis Championships
- List of table tennis players
- List of World Table Tennis Championships medalists
