= William Holzrichter =

American table tennis player

Billy Holzrichter
Personal information
- Nationality: United States
- Born: 1 January 1922
- Died: 23 March 2005 (aged 83)
Medal record
Representing United States
World Table Tennis Championships
Bronze medal – third place	1947	Mixed Doubles
Silver medal – second place	1947	Men's Team

William Clarence 'Billy' Holzrichter (January 1, 1922 - March 23, 2005) was an American international table tennis player.

He won a silver medal at the 1947 World Table Tennis Championships in the men's team event and a bronze medal in the mixed doubles with Davida Hawthorn.

He was inducted into the USA Table Tennis Hall of Fame in 1980.

Holzrichter died on March 23, 2005, at the age of 83.

== See also ==
- List of table tennis players
- List of World Table Tennis Championships medalists
