= Peggy McLean =

American table tennis player (1926–2013)

Personal information
- Full name: Margaret Rinn McLean
- Nationality: United States
- Born: 8 July 1926 Queens, New York, U.S.
- Died: 30 March 2013 (aged 86) Westport, Connecticut, U.S.
- Height: 5 ft 2 in (157 cm)
- Weight: 110 lb (50 kg)

Sport
- Sport: Table tennis
- Playing style: Aggressive
Medal record
Women's table tennis
Representing United States
World Championships
Bronze medal – third place	1949 Stockholm	Mixed
Gold medal – first place	1949 Stockholm	Team

Margaret Rinn McLean (later Folke; July 8, 1926 – March 30, 2013) was an American international table tennis player.

== Table tennis career ==
McLean won two World Championship medals including a gold medal in the women's team event at the 1949 World Table Tennis Championships.

In addition she won a mixed doubles bronze medal with Marty Reisman in 1949. She also won two English Open titles.

== Later life and death ==
McLean was inducted into the USA Hall of Fame in 1980.

McLean died in Westport, Connecticut on March 30, 2013, at the age of 86.

== See also ==
- List of table tennis players
- List of World Table Tennis Championships medalists
