= Geza Eros =

Romanian table tennis player

Personal information
- Nationality: Romania Hungary
Medal record
Representing Romania
World Table Tennis Championships
Bronze medal – third place	1937	Mixed Doubles

Geza Eros is a male former international table tennis and tennis player from Romania and later Hungary.

== Career ==
Table Tennis

He won a bronze medal at the 1937 World Table Tennis Championships in the mixed doubles with Angelica Rozeanu.

Tennis

He was also a notable tennis player active between 1947 and 1958. He competed at the Wimbledon Championships in 1947 and 1948. He won singles titles at the West Sussex Championships in 1947 and the Scottish Championships in 1948. Additionally he was also a finalist at the Paignton Open. He played his final singles tournament at the Hungarian International Championships in Budapest in 1958.

== See also ==
- List of table tennis players
- List of World Table Tennis Championships medalists
