= Huguette Béolet =

French table tennis player

Personal information
- Nationality: France
- Born: 13 December 1919
Medal record
Representing France
World Table Tennis Championships
Bronze medal – third place	1949	Women's Team

Huguette Béolet (born 13 December 1919) is a French former international table tennis player.

Béolet won a bronze medal at the 1949 World Table Tennis Championships in the Corbillon Cup (women's team event) with Yolande Vannoni and Jeanne Delay for France.

In the early 1950s she was ranked number one in France and won six French national titles from 1937 to 1952.

== See also ==
- List of table tennis players
- List of World Table Tennis Championships medalists
