= Heinrich Bednar =

Austrian table tennis player (1922–2000)

Personal information
- Nationality: Austria
- Born: 30 June 1922
- Died: 17 December 2000 (aged 78)
Medal record
Representing Austria
World Table Tennis Championships
Bronze medal – third place	1947	Men's team
Bronze medal – third place	1948	Men's doubles
Bronze medal – third place	1948	Men's team

Heinrich Bednar was a male Austrian international table tennis player.

He won a bronze medal at the 1947 World Table Tennis Championships in the team event. He then secured a double bronze at the 1948 World Table Tennis Championships in the men's doubles with Herbert Wunsch and the men's team event.

== See also ==
- List of table tennis players
- List of World Table Tennis Championships medalists
