= Tage Flisberg =

Swedish table tennis player

Personal information
- Nationality: Sweden
- Born: 12 October 1917
- Died: 13 May 1989 (aged 71)
Medal record
Representing Sweden
World Table Tennis Championships
Bronze medal – third place	1949	Men's Doubles
Silver medal – second place	1954	Men's Singles

Tage Valfrid Flisberg (12 October 1917 – 13 May 1989) was a male Swedish international table tennis player.

He won a bronze medal at the 1949 World Table Tennis Championships in the men's doubles with Richard Bergmann. Five years later he won a silver medal at the 1954 World Table Tennis Championships in the men's singles.

== See also ==
- List of table tennis players
- List of World Table Tennis Championships medalists
