= Heribert Just =

Austrian table tennis player

Personal information
- Nationality: Austria
Medal record
Representing Austria
World Table Tennis Championships
Bronze medal – third place	1947	Men's team
Bronze medal – third place	1948	Men's team

Heribert Just was an Austrian international table tennis player.

Just won a bronze medal at the 1947 World Table Tennis Championships in the Swaythling Cup (men's team event). He then secured a second bronze at the 1948 World Table Tennis Championships in the Swaythling Cup.

== See also ==
- List of table tennis players
- List of World Table Tennis Championships medalists
