= Adolf Šlár =

Czech table tennis player

Personal information
- Nationality: Czech Republic
- Born: 14 February 1919 Prague, Czechoslovakia
- Died: 7 April 1987 (aged 68)
Medal record
Representing Czechoslovakia
World Table Tennis Championships
Bronze medal – third place	1936	Men's Doubles
Bronze medal – third place	1937	Men's Doubles
Bronze medal – third place	1937	Men's Team
Bronze medal – third place	1938	Men's Team
Silver medal – second place	1947	Men's Team
Gold medal – first place	1947	Mixed Doubles
Gold medal – first place	1947	Men's Doubles
Silver medal – second place	1954	Men's Team
Bronze medal – third place	1954	Men's Doubles

Adolf Šlár (14 February 1919 – 7 April 1987) was a Czech international table tennis player.

== Table tennis career ==
He won nine medals at the World Table Tennis Championships from 1935 to 1954. This included two gold medals at the 1947 World Table Tennis Championships in the team event and in the men's doubles with Václav Tereba respectively.

He also won an English Open title.

== Personal life ==
He was a Ministry of Foreign Trade official in Prague.

== See also ==
- List of table tennis players
- List of World Table Tennis Championships medalists
