= Thelma Thall =

American table tennis player (born 1924)

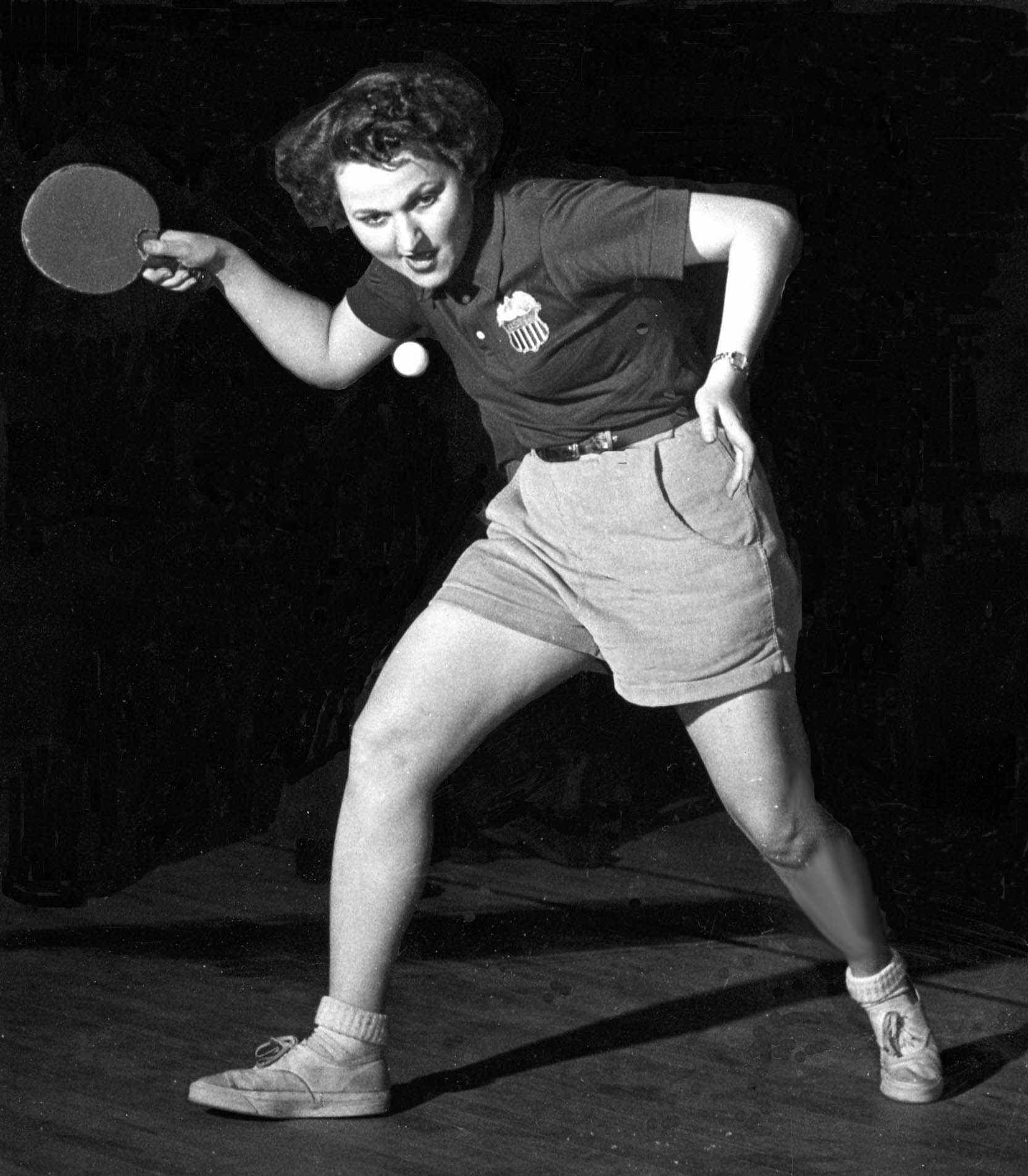
- Thall in 1948

Personal information
- Full name: Thelma Thall "Tybie" Sommer
- Born: March 12, 1924 (age 102) Columbus, Ohio, US
- Height: 5 ft 6 in (1.68 m)
- Weight: 70 kg (154 lb)

Sport
- Sport: Table tennis
Medal record
Women's table tennis
Representing United States
World Championships
Bronze medal – third place	1949 Stockholm	Singles
Gold medal – first place	1949 Stockholm	Team
Bronze medal – third place	1948 Wembley	Doubles
Gold medal – first place	1948 Wembley	Mixed

Thelma Thall "Tybie" Sommer (born March 12, 1924) is the only living American woman to have won two World Table Tennis Championships.

Thall received the USA Table Tennis Lifetime Achievement Award, and is in the Table Tennis Hall of Fame. She says that she excelled "because of her natural athleticism and her ability to analyze and remain objective".

== Early career ==
Thelma Thall was born on March 12, 1924 in Columbus, Ohio, and is Jewish. A tomboy as a little girl, she played much football and softball. When she was 13, she won a tennis racket in a Bingo game. Never having had any lessons, and yet seeing the similarities with softball, she represented Livingston Park and won the City Junior Tennis Championship. At the age of 15, she was the Captain of the Varsity Boys' Tennis Team at East High School, the only girl ever to play on the boys' team, let alone be Captain. She graduated 1st in a class of 550 students.

== 1940s achievements ==
In 1947, Thall won her first U.S. Open Women's Doubles Championship with her sister Leah. They also won the Canadian Nationals that year.

In 1948, Thall and Richard Miles were the first Americans to win the World's Mixed Doubles Title, in Wembley, London, England.

In 1949, Thall, as a member of the USA Team, won Singles and Doubles in the Corbillon Cup, a World Championship Event, in Stockholm, Sweden. That year, Thall and Miles won the English Open Mixed Doubles and Thall, with Peggy McLean, won the English Open Women’s Doubles.

Thall and her sister Leah won three U.S. National Women's Doubles, in 1947, 1948, and 1949. The Thall sisters also won the Canadian National Doubles in 1947 and 1948.

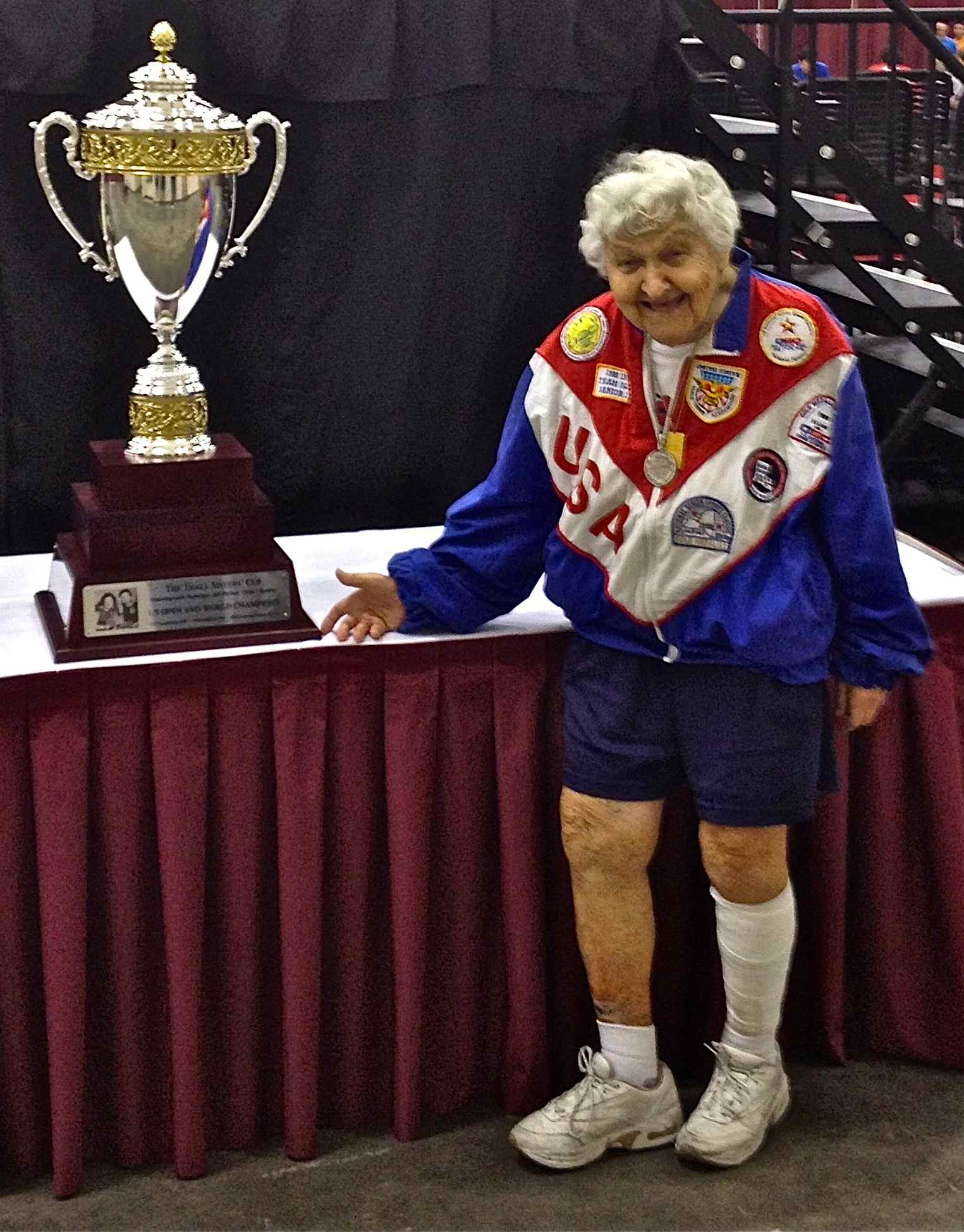
Thall standing next to "The Thall Sisters Loving Cup Trophy" 2012

== Later years ==
Thall was inducted into the United States Table Tennis Association Hall of Fame in 1980.

Married with children, she won several Singles Tennis titles in the Northeastern United States. In 1962, she was on the founding board that created the North Shore Women's Tennis League on Long Island, New York. In 2003, she was honored by that league at the Babe Zaharias Luncheon in New York, for creating the flourishing league, which now has over 2,000 participants. She won Mother/Daughter Tennis Titles in the state of Arizona, as well as the city of Phoenix, with daughter Marilyn, now a USPTA Tennis Pro.

In 2005, Thall and her sister received the USA Table Tennis Mark Mathews Lifetime Achievement Award.

In 2012, she presented "The Thall Sisters Cup", a newly-created trophy to the winner of the Women's Singles in the U.S. Open Table Tennis Championships. This perpetual trophy lists the winners from 1933 to the present (sister Leah won the US Open 9 times and the World's once; Thelma won the World's twice); while the winner each year gets a small replica, the original sits at the Olympic Training Center in Colorado Springs, Colorado.

Thall won the first of many Gold Medals in 1987, the inaugural year of the National Senior Olympics. She continues to compete and win Gold Medals, having attended and won the Arizona Senior Olympics, Rocky Mountain Senior Games, the Huntsman Games in Utah, and the National Senior Games with Marilyn.

== Honors ==
Thall received the USA Table Tennis Lifetime Achievement Award, and is in the Table Tennis Hall of Fame. Thall was inducted into the International Jewish Sports Hall of Fame in 2017.

== See also ==
- List of select Jewish table tennis players
- List of table tennis players
- List of World Table Tennis Championships medalists

== Sources ==
- Boggan, Tim (USATT Historian) (2003). History of US Table Tennis: The War Years. (Vol. II: 1940-1952). The Outer Office, Lime Kiln Road, Fulton MD: Tim Boggan. ISBN 0-9707657-1-1.
