= Mae Clouther =

American table tennis player

Personal information
- Nationality: United States
- Born: 1917
- Died: 1 February 1997 (aged 79–80)
Medal record
Representing United States
World Table Tennis Championships
Bronze medal – third place	1947	Team
Silver medal – second place	1947	Doubles

Mae Clouther (1917 – February 1, 1997) was a female United States international table tennis player.

She won a bronze medal at the 1947 World Table Tennis Championships in the women's team and a silver medal in the women's doubles with Reba Monness.

She was inducted into the USA Table Tennis Hall of Fame in 1984.

== See also ==
- List of table tennis players
- List of World Table Tennis Championships medalists
