= Dick Miles =

American singer-songwriter

Personal information
- Nationality: United States
- Born: 12 June 1925
- Died: 12 October 2010 (aged 85)

Sport
- Sport: Table tennis
Medal record
Men's table tennis
Representing United States
World Championships
Gold medal – first place	1948 Wembley	Mixed doubles
Silver medal – second place	1947 Paris	Team
Bronze medal – third place	1948 Wembley	Team
Bronze medal – third place	1949 Stockholm	Doubles
Bronze medal – third place	1949 Stockholm	Team
Bronze medal – third place	1959 Dortmund	Singles

Richard Theodore Miles (June 12, 1925 – October 12, 2010) was an American table tennis player who won 10 national championships between 1945 and 1962, more than any other player. After his playing career ended, Miles wrote an instructional guide and continued in his sport by playing match games and doing trick shot performances. In its obituary The New York Times called him "perhaps the greatest table tennis player the United States has ever produced".

== Early life ==
Miles was born on June 12, 1925, in Manhattan and was raised Jewish by his mother on the Upper West Side after his father left the family when Miles was two years old.

== Table tennis career ==
He started playing table tennis as a child after receiving a miniature table tennis set as a birthday gift around the time he was 10 and started playing on full-sized tables at PS 166. By the time he was a teenager he was devoting half his day to playing and practicing at the different clubs that lined Broadway, at times dropping out of DeWitt Clinton High School to focus on playing table tennis. Other sports he played in his youth included golf, stickball and Chinese handball, which helped him develop his abilities hitting a forehand shot. He enrolled at New York University, but dropped out to focus on his game. A heart murmur kept him from serving in the United States Army during World War II. Despite being the best American in the sport by the late 1940s, Miles could barely eke out an income of $1,000 a year by playing table tennis, which he supplemented by making bets on games, saying it was "unthinkable to play a match without a wager".

In addition to his strong defensive abilities, Miles was known for the powerful forehand shot he generated with topspin using an underhand grip on his paddle, which he tended to play directly down the middle of the table at his opponents. Tim Boggan, a table tennis player who became historian for USA Table Tennis, described how Miles would "go for the gut again and again" instead of trying to hit to the sides of the table. He used these skills to win U.S. national championships 10 times and making him competitive with the world's best players, reaching as far as the semifinals of the World Table Tennis Championships held in Dortmund, Germany in 1959 by defeating two of China's best players. Only two other American male table tennis players have reached that far in world competition and none has advanced any further.

After his competitive playing career was over, Miles wrote about the sport for Sports Illustrated in addition to his 1968 book The Game of Table Tennis. He traveled widely, playing matches and performing trick shots for the USO. He also started an import company that brought table tennis equipment from Asia for distribution in the U.S.

Miles accompanied the U.S. national team at the world championships held in Nagoya, Japan in 1971 when the team was invited to visit the People's Republic of China in what became known as Ping Pong Diplomacy, becoming what Time magazine described as being part of "most improbable — and most naïve — group of diplomats". There, Miles played an exhibition match against one of the Chinese players he had beaten in the 1959 championships. With the score tied late in the match, Miles sensed that his opponent had conceded him a point. Unwilling to win the game in that matter, Miles gave up a point himself. With each player refusing to allow himself to be the winner, the match ended in a draw.

== Personal life and death ==
Miles died in Manhattan at the age of 85 due to natural causes on October 12, 2010. He was survived by his wife, Mary Detsch. They had met each other in Central Park in 1970 and been companions for decades before they were married in 1993.

== See also ==
- List of select Jewish table tennis players
- List of World Table Tennis Championships medalists
