= Otto Eckl =

Austrian table tennis player

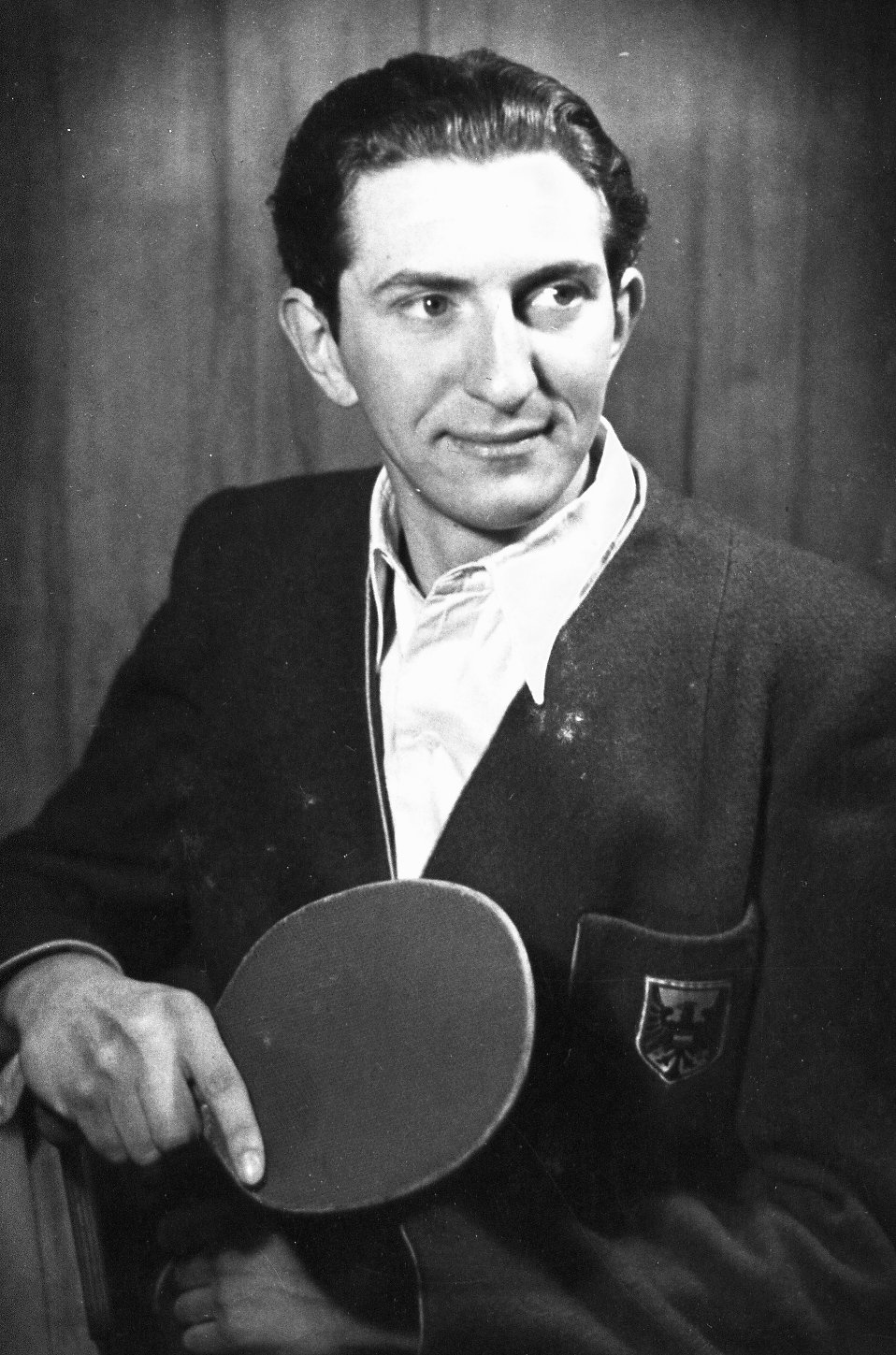

Personal information
- Nationality: Austria
- Born: 28 December 1922
- Died: 3 January 1993 (aged 70)
Medal record
Representing Austria
World Table Tennis Championships
Bronze medal – third place	1947	Men's team
Bronze medal – third place	1948	Men's team

Otto Eckl (1922–1993), was a male Austrian international table tennis player.

He won a bronze medal at the 1947 World Table Tennis Championships in the Swaythling Cup (men's team event). He then secured a second bronze at the 1948 World Table Tennis Championships in the Swaythling Cup.

== See also ==
- List of table tennis players
- List of World Table Tennis Championships medalists
