= Guy Amouretti =

French table tennis player

Personal information
- Nationality: France
- Born: 27 February 1925
- Died: 15 June 2011 (aged 86)
Medal record
Representing France
World Table Tennis Championships
Bronze medal – third place	1947	Men's Team
Bronze medal – third place	1948	Men's Singles
Silver medal – second place	1948	Men's Team
Bronze medal – third place	1952	Men's Singles
Bronze medal – third place	1953	Men's Team

Guy Amouretti (1925-2011), was a male French international table tennis player.

He won a bronze medal at the 1947 World Table Tennis Championships in the men's team event and the following year won a silver medal and another bronze at the 1948 World Table Tennis Championships in the men's team event and men's singles respectively.

In 1952 he won a bronze at the 1952 World Table Tennis Championships in the men's singles and the following year collected his fifth world championship medal after winning a bronze at the 1953 World Table Tennis Championships in the men's team event.

He was seven times champion of France in the singles, in 1944, 1948, 1953, 1954, 1955, 1957 and 1959. He died in 2011.

== See also ==
- List of table tennis players
- List of World Table Tennis Championships medalists
