= Marie Zelenková =

Czech table tennis player

Personal information
- Nationality: Czechoslovakia
Medal record
Representing Czechoslovakia
World Table Tennis Championships
Bronze medal – third place	1948	Women's team

Marie Zelenková is a Czech former international table tennis player who competed for Czechoslovakia.

She won a bronze medal during the 1948 World Table Tennis Championships in the Corbillon Cup for Czechoslovakia. The team consisted of Eliska Fürstova, Marie Kettnerová and Vlasta Depetrisová.

== See also ==
- List of World Table Tennis Championships medalists
