= Marty Reisman =

American table tennis player (1930–2012)

- Reisman in c. the early 2010s

Personal information
- Nationality: United States
- Born: February 1, 1930 New York City, U.S.
- Died: December 7, 2012 (aged 82) New York City, U.S.
Medal record
Table tennis
Representing United States
World Championships
Bronze medal – third place	1948 Wembley	Men's Team
Bronze medal – third place	1949 Stockholm	Men's Singles
Bronze medal – third place	1949 Stockholm	Men's Team
Bronze medal – third place	1949 Stockholm	Mixed Doubles
Bronze medal – third place	1952 Bombay	Men's Doubles

Martin Reisman (February 1, 1930 – December 7, 2012) was an American table tennis player and author. He won the U.S. Men's Singles Championship in 1958 and 1960 and the U.S. Hardbat Championship in 1997. He advocated the traditional hardbat style of table tennis.

Reisman was active in New York City's table tennis community for decades. He was nicknamed "the Needle" for his quick wit and slender build. In his 1974 memoir The Money Player, he wrote that top table tennis players had to be "gamblers or smugglers."

== Early life ==
Reisman was born on February 1, 1930, in Manhattan, New York City, to Sarah (Sally Nemorosky) and Morris, an Ashkenazi Jewish couple. He grew up on East Broadway with his older brother, David. His father worked as a cab driver.

He started playing table tennis after experiencing a nervous breakdown at the age of nine and found it soothing. He went on to become the city junior champion at the age of 13.

== Table tennis career ==
=== As a hustler and showman ===
He began playing for bets and hustling for money at Lawrence's Broadway Table Tennis Club on 54th and Broadway. He would lure in challengers, intentionally lose the first few games, then suggest doubling the stakes before showing his true skill level and winning.

If a bet was large enough, he would play sitting down or blindfolded. Sometimes, he would pull a $100 bill from a roll in his pocket and measure the height of the net.

At the age of 15, he placed a $500 bet on himself at a national tournament in Detroit with a man he thought was a bookie. The man turned out to be the head of the United States Table Tennis Association. Police officers escorted Reisman out of the tournament.

From 1949 to 1951, Reisman and Douglas Cartland toured the world performing a table tennis comedy routine for the opening act of the Harlem Globetrotters. They hit balls with frying pans and the soles of their sneakers.

=== Competitive play ===
Reisman won five bronze medals at the World Table Tennis Championships, starting with a men's team event bronze at 1948 World Table Tennis Championships, followed by three medals at the 1949 World Table Tennis Championships in the men's singles, the men's team and the mixed doubles with Peggy McLean. His fifth medal came in 1952 in the men's doubles with Douglas Cartland at the 1952 World Table Tennis Championships.

In 1952 Reisman was a favorite to win the World Championships in Bombay, India. He lost, however, in an early round to the Japanese player Hiroji Satoh, who was one of the first players to use an improved paddle with a rubberized foam sponge layer. Satoh went on to win the Men's Singles title.

Reisman won 22 major table tennis titles from 1946 to 2002, including two United States Opens and a British Open.

During the late 1950s and early 1960s, he ran the Riverside Table Tennis Club on 96th Street, just off Broadway. The club had many well-known patrons, including actor Dustin Hoffman, chess prodigy Bobby Fischer, and author Kurt Vonnegut.

=== Later life ===
Reisman became the oldest player to win an open national competition in a racket sport by winning the 1997 United States National Hardbat Championship at the age of 67.

He was a flamboyant figure, known for regularly wearing fashionable, bright clothing, accompanied by his signature fedora and Panama hats.

In 2008, he appeared on the Late Show with David Letterman. Fellow guest Matthew Broderick mentioned Reisman while talking about his ping-pong hobby. Letterman then revealed Reisman was in the studio, emerging to perform his signature trick of attempting to split a cigarette with a ping-pong ball live on stage.

Reisman was president of Table Tennis Nation at the time of his death in December 2012.

== Personal life ==
Reisman was married twice, and had a daughter, Debbie, with his first wife, Geri Falk. His second wife was Yoshiko Koshino.

== Death ==
Reisman died on December 7, 2012, at the age of 82, in New York City. The cause of death was heart and lung complications.

== Autobiography ==
Reisman's autobiography, The Money Player: The Confessions of America's Greatest Table Tennis Player and Hustler was published in 1974 by Morrow, ISBN 0-688-00273-0.

== In popular culture ==
The 2025 movie Marty Supreme directed by Josh Safdie, although not a biographical film, features the fictional lead character "Marty Mauser" (Timothée Chalamet). Mauser is a Jewish table tennis hustler from the Lower East Side who was loosely based on Reisman.

== See also ==
- List of Jewish table tennis players
- List of table tennis players
- List of World Table Tennis Championships medalists
