= Vera Thomas =

British tennis and table tennis player

Vera Thomas (Dace)
Personal information
- Full name: Vera Thomas (Dace)
- Nationality: England
- Born: 3 December 1921
- Died: 9 July 1995 (aged 73)

Sport
- Sport: Table tennis
Medal record
Women's table tennis
Representing England
World Championships
Bronze medal – third place	1950 Budapest	Doubles
Bronze medal – third place	1950 Budapest	Team
Silver medal – second place	1948 Wembley	Singles
Gold medal – first place	1948 Wembley	Doubles
Gold medal – first place	1948 Wembley	Team
Bronze medal – third place	1947 Paris	Singles
Gold medal – first place	1947 Paris	Team

Vera Thomas (Dace)
- Country (sports): United Kingdom

Grand Slam singles results
- French Open: 2R (1946)
- Wimbledon: 4R (1948)

Grand Slam doubles results
- Wimbledon: QF (1946, 1954)

Grand Slam mixed doubles results
- Wimbledon: QF (1946)

Vera Sybil Thomas (née Dace; 3 December 1921 – 9 July 1995) was an English international table tennis and tennis player.

== Table tennis career ==
She won seven medals at the World Table Tennis Championships including three gold medals; two in the team events and one as a member of the winning doubles team in the 1948 World Table Tennis Championships with Peggy Franks. She also won three English Open titles.

== Tennis career ==
As a tennis player she competed in 15 editions of the Wimbledon Championships between 1946 and 1961. Her best result in the singles was reaching the fourth round in 1948 in which she lost to Nelly Landry.

== Personal life ==
She married Arthur Thomas in 1947 and became Vera Thomas-Dace.

== See also ==
- List of table tennis players
- List of World Table Tennis Championships medalists
- List of England players at the World Team Table Tennis Championships
