= Helen Elliot =

Scottish table tennis player

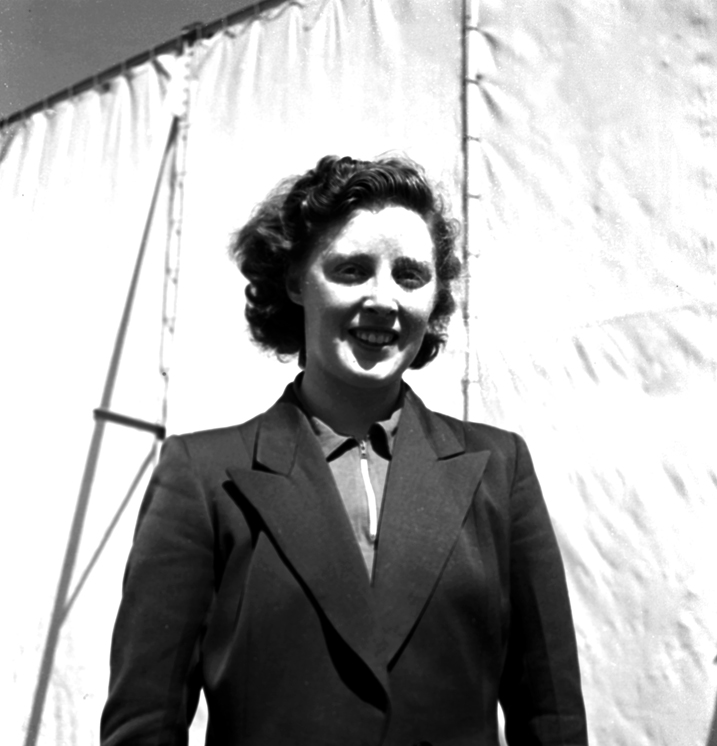
- Helen Elliott at the 1952 World Table Tennis Championships, Bombay, India. She won the Bronze in Women's doubles.

Personal information
- Full name: Helen Elliotti
- Nationality: Scotland
- Born: 20 January 1927 Edinburgh, Scotland
- Died: 12 January 2013 (aged 85)
Medal record
Women's table tennis
Representing Scotland
World Championships
Bronze medal – third place	1957 Stockholm	Doubles
Bronze medal – third place	1957 Stockholm	Mixed Doubles
Silver medal – second place	1955 Utrecht	Mixed Doubles
Bronze medal – third place	1952 Bombay	Doubles
Gold medal – first place	1950 Budapest	Doubles
Gold medal – first place	1949 Stockholm	Doubles
Silver medal – second place	1948 Wembley	Doubles

Helen Elliot (20 January 1927 – 12 January 2013) was an international table tennis player from Scotland.

== Table tennis career ==
Helen started playing table tennis aged 16. In 1946 she won the first of 13 consecutive Scottish Open women's singles titles and was capped by Scotland the following year. From 1948 to 1957 she won seven medals in the World Table Tennis Championships.

The seven medals included two golds at the 1949 World Table Tennis Championships and 1950 World Table Tennis Championships in the women's doubles where she partnered Gizi Farkas and Dora Beregi respectively.

She also won two English Open titles.

== Personal life ==
She coached at Butlins Holiday Camps with Johnny Leach. She married and became Helen Hamilton-Elliot and was President of the Commonwealth Table Tennis Federation.

== See also ==
- List of table tennis players
- List of World Table Tennis Championships medalists
