= František Tokár =

Slovak table tennis player

Personal information
- Nationality: Czechoslovakia
- Born: 25 May 1925 Veľké Chrašťany, Czechoslovakia
- Died: 29 October 1993 (aged 68) Bratislava, Slovakia

Sport
- Sport: Table tennis
Medal record
Men's table tennis
Representing Czechoslovakia
World Championships
Bronze medal – third place	1957 Stockholm	Team
Bronze medal – third place	1953 Bucharest	Team
Bronze medal – third place	1951 Vienna	Doubles
Gold medal – first place	1951 Vienna	Team
Silver medal – second place	1950 Budapest	Doubles
Gold medal – first place	1950 Budapest	Team
Gold medal – first place	1949 Stockholm	Doubles
Silver medal – second place	1949 Stockholm	Team
Gold medal – first place	1948 Wembley	Team
Gold medal – first place	1947 Paris	Team

František Tokár (25 May 1925 – 29 October 1993) was a Slovak table tennis player who represented Czechoslovakia.

== Personal life ==
Tokár was born on 25 May 1925 in Veľké Chrašťany. He worked at the Slovak Institute of Physical Training in Bratislava. He died in Bratislava on 29 October 1993.

== Table tennis career ==
From 1947 to 1957, he won ten medals in singles, doubles, and team events in the World Table Tennis Championships.

The ten World Championship medals included five gold medals; four in the men's team event and one in the doubles with Ivan Andreadis at the 1949 World Table Tennis Championships.

== Hall of Fame ==
He was inducted into the Hall of Fame of the International Table Tennis Federation in 1995.

== See also ==
- List of table tennis players
- List of World Table Tennis Championships medalists
