= Margaret Franks =

British table tennis player

Margaret 'Peggy' Franks
Personal information
- Nationality: England
- Born: c. 1925

Sport
- Sport: Table tennis
Medal record
Women's table tennis
Representing England
World Championships
Bronze medal – third place	1952 Bombay	Team
Bronze medal – third place	1951 Vienna	Team
Bronze medal – third place	1950 Budapest	Doubles
Bronze medal – third place	1950 Budapest	Team
Bronze medal – third place	1949 Stockholm	Mixed
Silver medal – second place	1949 Stockholm	Team
Gold medal – first place	1948 Wembley	Doubles
Gold medal – first place	1948 Wembley	Team
Bronze medal – third place	1947 Paris	Mixed
Gold medal – first place	1947 Paris	Team

Margaret 'Peggy' Franks (born c. 1925) is a former table tennis player from England.

== Table tennis career ==
From 1947 to 1952 she won ten medals in singles, doubles, and team events in the World Table Tennis Championships.

The ten medals included three gold medals; two in team events with England at the 1947 World Table Tennis Championships and 1948 World Table Tennis Championships and one in the women's doubles with Vera Thomas in 1948.

She also won an English Open title.

== Personal life ==
She married Kent and Essex county player Ronnie Hook on 12 January 1950.

== See also ==
- List of table tennis players
- List of World Table Tennis Championships medalists
- List of England players at the World Team Table Tennis Championships
