= Gizella Farkas =

Hungarian table tennis player

Gizi Farkas
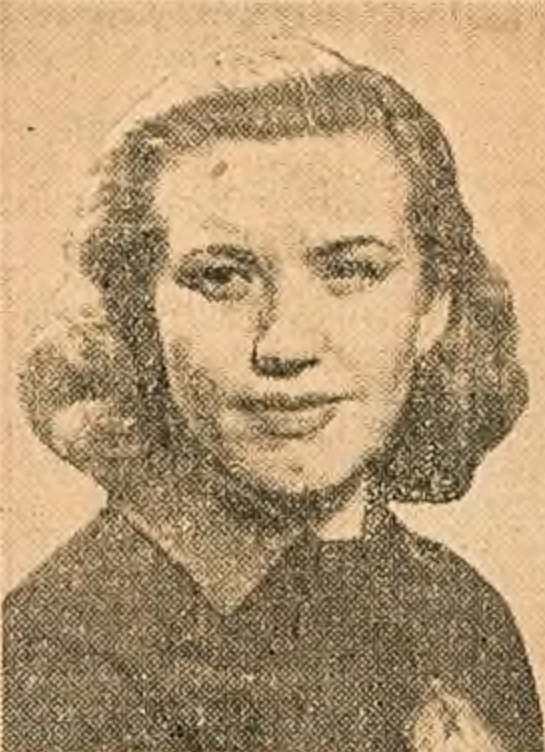
- Farkas in 1953

Personal information
- Full name: LANTOS-GERVAI-FARKAS Gizella
- Nationality: Hungary
- Born: 18 November 1925
- Died: 17 June 1996 (aged 70)

Sport
- Sport: Table tennis
Medal record
Women's table tennis
Representing Hungary
World Championships
Bronze medal – third place	1959 Dortmund	Mixed Doubles
Bronze medal – third place	1954 Wembley	Doubles
Gold medal – first place	1954 Wembley	Mixed Doubles
Silver medal – second place	1954 Wembley	Team
Silver medal – second place	1953 Bucharest	Singles
Gold medal – first place	1953 Bucharest	Doubles
Bronze medal – third place	1953 Bucharest	Mixed Doubles
Bronze medal – third place	1953 Bucharest	Team
Silver medal – second place	1952 Bombay	Singles
Bronze medal – third place	1952 Bombay	Doubles
Bronze medal – third place	1952 Bombay	Mixed Doubles
Silver medal – second place	1951 Vienna	Singles
Bronze medal – third place	1951 Vienna	Doubles
Silver medal – second place	1950 Budapest	Singles
Silver medal – second place	1950 Budapest	Doubles
Gold medal – first place	1950 Budapest	Mixed Doubles
Silver medal – second place	1950 Budapest	Team
Gold medal – first place	1949 Stockholm	Singles
Gold medal – first place	1949 Stockholm	Doubles
Gold medal – first place	1949 Stockholm	Mixed Doubles
Bronze medal – third place	1949 Stockholm	Team
Gold medal – first place	1948 Wembley	Singles
Silver medal – second place	1948 Wembley	Team
Gold medal – first place	1947 Paris	Singles
Gold medal – first place	1947 Paris	Doubles
Gold medal – first place	1947 Paris	Mixed Doubles
Silver medal – second place	1947 Paris	Team
European Championships
Bronze medal – third place	1960 Zagreb	Doubles
Gold medal – first place	1960 Zagreb	Team
Bronze medal – third place	1958 Budapest	Doubles
Gold medal – first place	1958 Budapest	Mixed Doubles

Gizella 'Gizi' Farkas (18 November 1925 in Miskolc – 17 June 1996 in Vienna) was a female international table tennis player from Hungary.

== Table tennis career ==
From 1947 to 1960 she won many medals in singles, doubles, and team events in the Table Tennis European Championships and in the World Table Tennis Championships.

Farkas is recognised as one of the leading female players in the history of the sport. Of the 27 World Championship medals that she won they included ten gold medals; three in the singles at the 1947 World Table Tennis Championships, 1948 World Table Tennis Championships and 1949 World Table Tennis Championships, three in the doubles and four in the mixed doubles.

== Personal life ==
She married three times to László Fekete, Andorné Gervai and Mihály Lantos. From 1974 until her death, she lived in Austria.

== See also ==
- List of table tennis players
- List of World Table Tennis Championships medalists
