= 1956 World Table Tennis Championships – Men's team =

1956 Swaythling Cup (men's team)

The 1956 World Table Tennis Championships – Swaythling Cup (men's team) was the 23rd edition of the men's team championship.

Japan won the gold medal defeating Czechoslovakia 5–1 in the final. China and Romania won bronze medals after finishing second in their respective groups.

== Medalists ==
Event	Gold	Silver	Bronze
Men's team	Japan; Ichiro Ogimura; Toshiaki Tanaka; Yoshio Tomita; Keisuke Tsunoda	Czechoslovakia; Ivan Andreadis; Ladislav Štípek; Václav Tereba; Ludvík Vyhnanovský	China; Hu Ping-chuan; Chiang Yung-Ning; Tsen Huai-Kuang; Wang Chuanyao; Yang Jai-Hua
Men's team	Japan; Ichiro Ogimura; Toshiaki Tanaka; Yoshio Tomita; Keisuke Tsunoda	Czechoslovakia; Ivan Andreadis; Ladislav Štípek; Václav Tereba; Ludvík Vyhnanovský	Romania; Matei Gantner; Tiberiu Harasztosi; Paul Pesch; Mircea Popescu; Toma Reiter

== Swaythling Cup tables ==
=== Group A ===
Pos	Team	P	W	L	Pts
1	Japan	7	7	0	14
2	Romania	7	6	1	12
3	Germany	7	5	2	10
4	Hong Kong	7	4	3	8
5	Sweden	7	3	4	6
6	Philippines	7	1	6	2
7	Australia	7	1	6	2
8	Singapore	7	1	6	2

=== Group B ===
Pos	Team	P	W	L	Pts
1	Czechoslovakia	7	7	0	14
2	China	7	5	2	10
3	England	7	5	2	10
4	South Vietnam	7	5	2	10
5	India	7	3	4	6
6	United States	7	2	5	4
7	(South Korea) Korea	7	1	6	2
8	Portugal	7	0	6	0

== Final ==
Japan 5		Czechoslovakia 1	Score
Ogimura	bt	Andreadis	26–28 21–19 21–13
Ogimura	bt	Štípek	21–6 21–18
Tanaka	bt	Vyhnanovský	21–11 18–21 21–16
Tanaka	bt	Štípek	21–12 21–13
Tsunoda	lost to	Andreadis	22–24 21–16 16–21
Tsunoda	bt	Vyhnanovský	21–11 21–19

== See also ==
List of World Table Tennis Championships medalists
