= 1957 World Table Tennis Championships – Men's singles =

1957 Men's singles

The 1957 World Table Tennis Championships men's singles was the 24th edition of the men's singles championship.

Toshiaki Tanaka defeated Ichiro Ogimura in the final, winning three sets to nil to secure the title.

== Seeds ==
1. (Japan) Ichiro Ogimura
2. (Japan) Toshiaki Tanaka
3. (Czechoslovakia) Ivan Andreadis
4. (England) Richard Bergmann
5. (Hungary) Ferenc Sidó
6. (Romania) Matei Gantner
7. (Japan) Yoshio Tomita
8. (Hungary) Elemér Gyetvai
9. (Czechoslovakia) Ladislav Štípek
10. (Hungary) Kálmán Szepesi
11. (China) Chiang Yung-Ning
12. (Romania) Tiberiu Harasztosi

== Results ==
Round of 16
(Japan) Ichiro Ogimura	21	13	21	21
(China) Chiang Yung-Ning	14	21	19	9
(Poland) Alojzy Ehrlich	22	15	21	20	21
(England) Brian Kennedy	20	21	18	22	18
(Japan) Keisuke Tsunoda	21	20	21	21
(Hungary) László Földy	19	22	15	16
(Czechoslovakia) Ivan Andreadis	21	21	21
(England) Michael Thornhill	10	13	14
(East Germany) Heinz Schneider	21	21	21
(Romania) Toma Reiter	14	11	16
(Japan) Toshihiko Miyata	16	21	21	16	21
(Czechoslovakia) Václav Tereba	21	19	16	21	17
(Hungary) Zoltán Berczik	21	21	21
(Romania) Tiberiu Harasztosi	15	9	6
(Japan) Toshiaki Tanaka	21	21	21
(Iran) Amir Ehteshamzadeh	13	18	18

Quarterfinals
(Japan) Ogimura	21	21	21
(Poland) Erlich	10	17	16
(Japan) Tsunoda	14	21	12	21	21
(Czechoslovakia) Andreadis	21	14	21	17	23
(East Germany) Schneider	14	11	21	21	21
(Japan) Miyata	21	21	19	8	17
(Hungary) Berczik	11	21	19	21	15
(Japan) Tanaka	21	17	21	15	21

Semifinals
(Japan) Ogimura	21	17	21	21
(Czechoslovakia) Andreadis	11	21	10	17
(East Germany) Schneider	19	18	20
(Japan) Tanaka	21	21	22

Final
(Japan) Ogimura	11	18	19
(Japan) Tanaka	21	21	21

== See also ==
List of World Table Tennis Championships medalists
