= 1956 World Table Tennis Championships – Men's doubles =

1956 Men's doubles

The 1956 World Table Tennis Championships men's doubles was the 23rd edition of the men's doubles championship. Ichiro Ogimura and Yoshio Tomita won the title after defeating Ivan Andreadis and Ladislav Štípek in the final by three sets to nil.

== Results ==
Round of 16
(Czechoslovakia) Ladislav Štípek (Czechoslovakia) Ivan Andreadis	21	16	21	21
(Japan) Tatsuo Tsuno (Japan) Akio Nohira	9	21	16	16
(Hong Kong) Chung Chin Sing (Hong Kong) Tsui Cheung Ling	21	21	19	22
(United States) Bernie Bukiet (United States) Erwin Klein	9	12	21	20
(South Vietnam) Lê Văn Tiết (South Vietnam) Nguyen Kim Hang	6	17	10
(Japan) Toshiaki Tanaka (Japan) Keisuke Tsunoda	21	21	21
(South Korea) Lee Kyung Ho (South Korea) Cheng Young Suk	scr
(England) Richard Bergmann (England) Johnny Leach	w/o
(Czechoslovakia) Václav Tereba (Czechoslovakia) Ludvík Vyhnanovský	21	21	22
(India) Sudhir Thackersey (India) K Ramakrishna	19	15	20
(Sweden) Tage Flisberg (Sweden) Bjorne Mellstrom	20	21	21	21
(China) Wang Chuan-Yao (China) Tsen Huai-Kuang	22	19	13	19
(Romania) Toma Reiter (Romania) Matei Gantner	w/o
(West Germany) Leopold Holusek (West Germany) Josef Seiz	scr
(India) Uttam Chandarana (India) Yatin Vyas	9	8	13
(Japan) Ichiro Ogimura (Japan) Yoshio Tomita	21	21	21

Quarterfinals
(Czechoslovakia) Štípek (Czechoslovakia) Andreadis	13	21	21	22
(Hong Kong) Chung Chin Sing (Hong Kong) Tsui Cheung Ling	21	19	3	20
(Japan) Tanako (Japan) Tsunoda	19	21	21	21	21
(England) Bergmann (England) Leach	21	23	11	15	11
(Czechoslovakia) Tereba (Czechoslovakia) Vyhnanovský	21	21	19	21
(Sweden) Flisberg (Sweden) Mellstrom	14	10	21	10
(Romania) Reiter (Romania) Gantner	14	12	21
(Japan) Ogimura (Japan) Tomita	21	21	23

Semifinals
(Czechoslovakia) Štípek (Czechoslovakia) Andreadis	22	21	19	21
(Japan) Tanaka (Japan) Tsunoda	20	18	21	17
(Czechoslovakia) Tereba (Czechoslovakia) Vyhnanovský	13	13	21	14
(Japan) Ogimura (Japan) Tomita	21	21	19	21

Final
(Czechoslovakia) Štípek (Czechoslovakia) Andreadis	13	10	11
(Japan) Ogimura (Japan) Tomita	21	21	21

== See also ==
List of World Table Tennis Championships medalists
