= 1957 World Table Tennis Championships – Men's doubles =

1957 Men's doubles

The 1957 World Table Tennis Championships men's doubles was the 24th edition of the men's doubles championship. Ivan Andreadis and Ladislav Štípek won the title after defeating Ichiro Ogimura and Toshiaki Tanaka in the final by three sets to one.

== Results ==
Round of 16
(Japan) Ichiro Ogimura (Japan) Toshiaki Tanaka	21	14	21	21
(Romania) Toma Reiter (Romania) Matei Gantner	11	21	17	9
(Sweden) Ake Rakell (Sweden) Georg Karlsson	21	22	23
(Socialist Federal Republic of Yugoslavia) Josip Vogrinc (Socialist Federal Republic of Yugoslavia) Željko Hrbud	23	24	25
(Czechoslovakia) František Tokár (Hungary) Miklós Péterfy	12	21	23	21
(Australia) Phil Anderson (Australia) Arden Robinson	21	12	21	15
(Hungary) Elemér Gyetvai (Hungary) Ferenc Sidó	21	21	21
(West Germany) Bernie Vossebein (West Germany) Josef Wenninghoff	13	17	16
(Czechoslovakia) Václav Tereba (Czechoslovakia) Ludvík Vyhnanovský	18	21	21	18	21
(Socialist Federal Republic of Yugoslavia) Vilim Harangozo (Socialist Federal Republic of Yugoslavia) Žarko Dolinar	21	13	17	21	11
(Japan) Keisuke Tsunoda (Japan) Toshihiko Miyata	21	21	13	21
(England) Brian Kennedy (England) Ian Harrison	19	18	21	15
(China) Wang Chuang-Yao (China) Fu Chi Fong	14	21	13	21	21
(Sweden) Per-Olof Croneryd (Sweden) Lennart Rogersten	21	15	21	16	16
(England) Richard Bergmann (England) Johnny Leach	8	21	9	13
(Czechoslovakia) Ladislav Štípek (Czechoslovakia) Ivan Andreadis	21	19	21	21

Quarterfinals
(Japan) Ogimura (Japan) Tanaka	21	21	21
(Socialist Federal Republic of Yugoslavia) Vogrinc (Socialist Federal Republic of Yugoslavia) Hrbud	14	11	11
(Czechoslovakia) Tokár (Hungary) Peterfy	21	19	21	21
(Hungary) Gyetvai (Hungary) Sidó	13	21	19	19
(Czechoslovakia) Tereba (Czechoslovakia) Vyhnanovský	16	14	19
(Japan) Tsunoda (Japan) Miyata	21	21	21
(China) Wang Chuang-Yao (China) Fu Chi-Fong	21	24	12	19	19
(Czechoslovakia) Štípek (Czechoslovakia) Andreadis	18	22	21	21	21

Semifinals
(Japan) Ogimura (Japan) Tanaka	21	21	21
(Hungary) Gyetvai (Hungary) Sidó	13	11	11
(Japan) Tsunoda (Japan) Miyata	18	21	18	16
(Czechoslovakia) Štípek (Czechoslovakia) Andreadis	21	9	21	21

Final
(Japan) Ogimura (Japan) Tanaka	13	21	19	17
(Czechoslovakia) Štípek (Czechoslovakia) Andreadis	21	18	21	21

== See also ==
- List of World Table Tennis Championships medalists
