= 1956 World Table Tennis Championships =

1956 edition of the World Table Tennis Championships

The 1956 World Table Tennis Championships were held in Tokyo from April 2 to April 11, 1956.

== Medalists ==
=== Team ===
Event	Gold	Silver	Bronze
Swaythling Cup; Men's Team	Japan; Ichiro Ogimura; Toshiaki Tanaka; Yoshio Tomita; Keisuke Tsunoda	Czechoslovakia; Ivan Andreadis; Ladislav Štípek; Václav Tereba; Ludvík Vyhnanovský	China; Hu Ping-chuan; Chiang Yung-Ning; Tsen Huai-Kuang; Wang Chuanyao; Yang Jai-Hua
Swaythling Cup; Men's Team	Japan; Ichiro Ogimura; Toshiaki Tanaka; Yoshio Tomita; Keisuke Tsunoda	Czechoslovakia; Ivan Andreadis; Ladislav Štípek; Václav Tereba; Ludvík Vyhnanovský	Romania; Matei Gantner; Tiberiu Harasztosi; Paul Pesch; Mircea Popescu; Toma Reiter
Corbillon Cup; Women's Team	Romania; Angelica Rozeanu; Ella Zeller	England; Ann Haydon; Diane Rowe; Jill Rook	Japan; Fujie Eguchi; Tomi Okawa; Yoshiko Tanaka; Kiiko Watanabe

=== Individual ===
Event	Gold	Silver	Bronze
Men's singles	(Japan) Ichiro Ogimura	(Japan) Toshiaki Tanaka	(Japan) Yoshio Tomita
Men's singles	(Japan) Ichiro Ogimura	(Japan) Toshiaki Tanaka	(Japan) Akio Nohira
Women's singles	(Japan) Tomie Okawa	(Japan) Kiiko Watanabe	(Japan) Fujie Eguchi
Women's singles	(Japan) Tomie Okawa	(Japan) Kiiko Watanabe	(Romania) Ella Zeller
Men's doubles	(Japan) Ichiro Ogimura (Japan) Yoshio Tomita	(Czechoslovakia) Ivan Andreadis (Czechoslovakia) Ladislav Štípek	(Czechoslovakia) Václav Tereba (Czechoslovakia) Ludvik Vyhnanovsky
Men's doubles	(Japan) Ichiro Ogimura (Japan) Yoshio Tomita	(Czechoslovakia) Ivan Andreadis (Czechoslovakia) Ladislav Štípek	(Japan) Toshiaki Tanaka (Japan) Keisuke Tsunoda
Women's doubles	(Romania) Angelica Rozeanu (Romania) Ella Zeller	(Japan) Fujie Eguchi (Japan) Kiiko Watanabe	(Japan) Tomi Okawa (Japan) Yoshiko Tanaka
Women's doubles	(Romania) Angelica Rozeanu (Romania) Ella Zeller	(Japan) Fujie Eguchi (Japan) Kiiko Watanabe	(England) Ann Haydon (England) Diane Rowe
Mixed doubles	(United States) Erwin Klein (United States) Leah Neuberger	(Czechoslovakia) Ivan Andreadis (England) Ann Haydon	(Japan) Motoo Fujii (Japan) Yoshiko Tanaka
Mixed doubles	(United States) Erwin Klein (United States) Leah Neuberger	(Czechoslovakia) Ivan Andreadis (England) Ann Haydon	(Romania) Toma Reiter (Romania) Ella Zeller
