= 1957 World Table Tennis Championships – Men's team =

1957 Swaythling Cup (men's team)

The 1957 World Table Tennis Championships – Swaythling Cup (men's team) was the 24th edition of the men's team championship.

Japan won the gold medal defeating Hungary 5–2 in the final. China and Czechoslovakia won bronze medals after elimination from the semi-final round.

== Medalists ==
Event	Gold	Silver	Bronze
	Japan; Toshihiko Miyata; Ichiro Ogimura; Toshiaki Tanaka; Keisuke Tsunoda	Hungary; Zoltán Berczik; László Földy; Elemér Gyetvai; Miklós Péterfy; Ferenc Sidó	China; Fu Chi Fong; Hu Ping-chuan; Chiang Yung-Ning; Wang Chuanyao; Chuang Chia-Fu
	Japan; Toshihiko Miyata; Ichiro Ogimura; Toshiaki Tanaka; Keisuke Tsunoda	Hungary; Zoltán Berczik; László Földy; Elemér Gyetvai; Miklós Péterfy; Ferenc Sidó	Czechoslovakia; Ivan Andreadis; Ladislav Štípek; Václav Tereba; František Tokár; Ludvík Vyhnanovský

== Swaythling Cup tables ==
=== Group 1 ===
Pos	Team	P	W	L	Pts
1	China	7	7	0	14
2	Romania	7	6	1	12
3	India	7	5	2	10
4	Belgium	7	4	3	8
5	Scotland	7	2	5	4
5	Switzerland	7	2	5	4
5	Portugal	7	2	5	4
8	Luxembourg	7	0	7	0

=== Group 2 ===
Pos	Team	P	W	L	Pts
1	Japan	8	8	0	16
2	South Vietnam	8	7	1	14
3	Sweden	8	6	2	12
4	Poland	8	5	3	10
5	Iran	8	4	4	8
6	France	8	3	5	6
7	Finland	8	2	6	4
8	Canada	8	1	7	2
9	South Africa	8	0	8	0

=== Group 3 ===
Pos	Team	P	W	L	Pts
1	Czechoslovakia	7	7	0	14
2	United States	7	5	2	10
2	Brazil	7	5	2	10
2	West Germany	7	5	2	10
5	Australia	7	3	4	6
6	Italy	7	2	5	4
7	Norway	7	1	6	2
8	Denmark	7	0	7	0

=== Group 4 ===
Pos	Team	P	W	L	Pts
1	Hungary	7	7	0	14
2	(Socialist Federal Republic of Yugoslavia) Yugoslavia	7	6	1	12
3	England	7	4	3	8
3	Austria	7	4	3	8
5	Netherlands	7	3	4	6
6	Wales	7	2	5	4
6	Spain	7	2	5	4
8	Lebanon	7	0	7	0

== Semifinals ==
Team One	Team Two	Score
Japan	China	5–1
Hungary	Czechoslovakia	5–0

== Final ==
Japan 5		Hungary 2	Score
Ogimura	bt	Sidó	21–17 22–20
Ogimura	bt	Berczik	21–14 21–11
Tanaka	bt	Földy	21–19 22–20
Tanaka	lost to	Sidó	17–21 12–21
Tanaka	bt	Berczik	20–22 21–19 21–19
Tsunoda	lost to	Berczik	14–21 16–21
Tsunoda	bt	Földy	21–13 11–21 26–24

== See also ==
List of World Table Tennis Championships medalists
