= 1957 World Table Tennis Championships =

1957 edition of the World Table Tennis Championships

The 1957 World Table Tennis Championships were held in Stockholm from March 7 to March 15, 1957.

== Medalists ==
=== Team ===
| Event | Gold | Silver | Bronze |
|---|---|---|---|
| Swaythling Cup; Men's Team | Japan; Toshihiko Miyata; Ichiro Ogimura; Toshiaki Tanaka; Keisuke Tsunoda | Hungary; Zoltán Berczik; László Földy; Elemér Gyetvai; Miklós Péterfy; Ferenc Sidó | China; Fu Chi Fong; Hu Ping-chuan; Chiang Yung-Ning; Wang Chuanyao; Chuang Chia-Fu |
| Swaythling Cup; Men's Team | Japan; Toshihiko Miyata; Ichiro Ogimura; Toshiaki Tanaka; Keisuke Tsunoda | Hungary; Zoltán Berczik; László Földy; Elemér Gyetvai; Miklós Péterfy; Ferenc Sidó | Czechoslovakia; Ivan Andreadis; Ladislav Štípek; Václav Tereba; František Tokár; Ludvík Vyhnanovský |
| Corbillon Cup; Women's Team | Japan; Fujie Eguchi; Taeko Namba; Tomie Okawa; Kiiko Watanabe | Romania; Maria Golopenta; Angelica Rozeanu; Ella Zeller | China; Qiu Zhonghui; Sun Meiying; Ye Peiqiong |

=== Individual ===
| Event | Gold | Silver | Bronze |
|---|---|---|---|
| Men's Singles | (Japan) Toshiaki Tanaka | (Japan) Ichiro Ogimura | (East Germany) Heinz Schneider |
| Men's Singles | (Japan) Toshiaki Tanaka | (Japan) Ichiro Ogimura | (Czechoslovakia) Ivan Andreadis |
| Women's singles | (Japan) Fujie Eguchi | (England) Ann Haydon | (Japan) Kiiko Watanabe |
| Women's singles | (Japan) Fujie Eguchi | (England) Ann Haydon | (Romania) Ella Zeller |
| Men's doubles | (Czechoslovakia) Ivan Andreadis (Czechoslovakia) Ladislav Štípek | (Japan) Ichiro Ogimura (Japan) Toshiaki Tanaka | (Japan) Toshihiko Miyata (Japan) Keisuke Tsunoda |
| Men's doubles | (Czechoslovakia) Ivan Andreadis (Czechoslovakia) Ladislav Štípek | (Japan) Ichiro Ogimura (Japan) Toshiaki Tanaka | (Hungary) Elemér Gyetvai (Hungary) Ferenc Sidó |
| Women's doubles | (Hungary) Lívia Mossóczy (Hungary) Ágnes Simon | (England) Ann Haydon (England) Diane Rowe | (Romania) Angelica Rozeanu (Romania) Ella Zeller |
| Women's doubles | (Hungary) Lívia Mossóczy (Hungary) Ágnes Simon | (England) Ann Haydon (England) Diane Rowe | (Scotland) Helen Elliot (Romania) Maria Golopenta |
| Mixed doubles | (Japan) Ichiro Ogimura (Japan) Fujie Eguchi | (Czechoslovakia) Ivan Andreadis (England) Ann Haydon | (Japan) Keisuke Tsunoda (Japan) Taeko Namba |
| Mixed doubles | (Japan) Ichiro Ogimura (Japan) Fujie Eguchi | (Czechoslovakia) Ivan Andreadis (England) Ann Haydon | (Czechoslovakia) Ludvík Vyhnanovský (Scotland) Helen Elliot |
