= 1957 World Table Tennis Championships – Mixed doubles =

1957 Mixed doubles

The 1957 World Table Tennis Championships mixed doubles was the 24th edition of the mixed doubles championship. Ichiro Ogimura and Fujie Eguchi won the title after defeating Ivan Andreadis and Ann Haydon in the final by three sets to two.

== Results ==
Round of 16
(Czechoslovakia) Ladislav Štípek (Romania) Angelica Rozeanu	3
(West Germany) Bernhard Vossebein (West Germany) Annegret Thole	0
(United States) Bernard Bukiet (United States) Mildred Shahian	1
(Czechoslovakia) Ludvík Vyhnanovský (Scotland) Helen Elliot	3
(Sweden) Bjorne Mellstroem (Sweden) Elisabeth Thorsson	18	17	13
(England) Johnny Leach (England) Diane Rowe	21	21	21
(Japan) Ichiro Ogimura (Japan) Fujie Eguchi	3
(Hungary) Ferenc Sidó (Hungary) Éva Kóczián	1
(Japan) Keisuke Tsunoda (Japan) Taeko Namba	3
(France) Maurice Granier (France) Monique Alber	0
(West Germany) Heinz Reimann (Czechoslovakia) Vendula Schwarzova	0
(Hungary) Elemér Gyetvai (Hungary) Ilona Kerekes	3
(Romania) Matei Gantner (Romania) Ella Zeller	2
(Japan) Toshiaki Tanaka (Japan) Kiiko Watanabe	3
(Hungary) Miklós Péterfy (Hungary) Lívia Mossóczy	17	19	19
(Czechoslovakia) Ivan Andreadis (England) Ann Haydon	21	21	21

Quarterfinals
(Czechoslovakia) Štípek (Romania) Rozeanu	9	16	18
(Czechoslovakia) Vyhnanovský (Scotland) Elliot	21	21	21
(England) Leach (England) Rowe	13	13	16
(Japan) Ogimura (Japan) Eguchi	21	21	21
(Japan) Tsunoda (Japan) Namba	21	21	22
(Hungary) Gyetvai (Hungary) Kerekes	15	19	20
(Japan) Tanaka (Japan) Watanabe	21	17	21	13	14
(Czechoslovakia) Andreadis (England) Haydon	18	21	15	21	21

Semifinals
(Czechoslovakia) Vyhnanovský (Scotland) Elliot	21	21	16	16	18
(Japan) Ogimura (Japan) Tanaka	15	15	21	21	21
(Japan) Tsunoda (Japan) Namba	16	21	21	8	13
(Czechoslovakia) Andreadis (England) Haydon	21	18	14	21	21

Final
(Japan) Ogimura (Japan) Eguchi	21	19	21	10	21
(Czechoslovakia) Andreadis (England) Haydon	16	21	18	21	19

== See also ==
List of World Table Tennis Championships medalists
