= 1955 World Table Tennis Championships – Men's doubles =

1955 Men's doubles

The 1955 World Table Tennis Championships men's doubles was the 22nd edition of the men's doubles championship. Ivan Andreadis and Ladislav Štípek won the title after defeating Žarko Dolinar and Vilim Harangozo in the final by three sets to nil.

== Results ==
Round of 16
(Czechoslovakia) Ladislav Štípek (Czechoslovakia) Ivan Andreadis	3
(Hungary) Kálmán Szepesi (Romania) Tiberiu Harasztosi	0
(West Germany) Conny Freundorfer (West Germany) Hans Rockmeier	3
(United States) Bernie Bukiet (United States) Erwin Klein	0
(France) Stephen Cafiero (France) Jean-Claude Sala	3
(Netherlands) Cor Du Buy (Netherlands) Willy Van Zoelen	0
(Japan) Ichiro Ogimura (Japan) Yoshio Tomita	3
(West Germany) Kurt Seifert (West Germany) Horst Jung	0
(Hungary) Ferenc Sidó (Hungary) József Kóczián	3
(England) Ivor Jones (England) Peter Pudney	0
(England) Richard Bergmann (England) Johnny Leach	3
(Romania) Toma Reiter (Romania) Matei Gantner	0
(United States) Dick Miles (United States) Johnny Somael	3
(Netherlands) Wim Stoop (Netherlands) Bert Onnes	0
(France) Alojzy Ehrlich (France) Raoul Bedoc	3
(Socialist Federal Republic of Yugoslavia) Žarko Dolinar (Socialist Federal Republic of Yugoslavia) Vilim Harangozo	0

Quarterfinals
(Czechoslovakia) Štípek (Czechoslovakia) Andreadis	3
(West Germany) Freundorfer (West Germany) Rockmeier	0
(France) Cafiero (France) Sala	1	9	12
(Japan) Ogimura (Japan) Tomita	21	21	21
(Hungary) Sidó (Hungary) Kóczián	19	22	21	21
(England) Bergmann (England) Leach	21	20	17	18
(United States) Miles (United States) Somael	21	21	13	14	21
(Socialist Federal Republic of Yugoslavia) Dolinar (Socialist Federal Republic of Yugoslavia) Harangozo	11	16	21	21	23

Semifinals
(Czechoslovakia) Štípek (Czechoslovakia) Andreadis	21	14	23	15	33
(Japan) Ogimura (Japan) Tomita	16	21	21	21	31
(Hungary) Sidó (Hungary) Kóczián	14	11	21	16
(Socialist Federal Republic of Yugoslavia) Dolinar (Socialist Federal Republic of Yugoslavia) Harangozo	21	21	14	21

Final
(Czechoslovakia) Štípek (Czechoslovakia) Andreadis	21	21	21
(Socialist Federal Republic of Yugoslavia) Dolinar (Socialist Federal Republic of Yugoslavia) Harangozo	10	7	18

== See also ==
List of World Table Tennis Championships medalists
