= 1956 World Table Tennis Championships – Men's singles =

1956 Men's singles

The 1956 World Table Tennis Championships men's singles was the 23rd edition of the men's singles championship.

Ichiro Ogimura defeated Toshiaki Tanaka in the final, winning three sets to two to secure the title.

== Results ==
Round of 16
(Czechoslovakia) Ivan Andreadis	16	17	11
(United States) Dick Miles	21	21	21
(Japan) Ichiro Ogimura	21	21	21
(Hong Kong) Chung Chin-Sing	7	15	12
(England) Richard Bergmann	21	18	21	13	21
(Romania) Matei Gantner	19	21	11	21	13
(Japan) Yoshio Tomita	21	17	21	14	22
(China) Chiang Yung-Ning	17	21	16	21	20
(Japan) Akio Nohira	21	21	21
(United States) Erwin Klein	16	13	15
(India) Krishna Nagaraj	21	22	21
(Japan) Seiji Yamada	17	20	16
(Japan) Kazuo Kawai	21	21	21
(Czechoslovakia) Václav Tereba	13	18	17
(Japan) Toshiaki Tanaka	21	21	21
(Japan) Keijii Kodama	11	12	16

Quarterfinals
(United States) Miles	16	14	13
(Japan) Ogimura	21	21	21
(England) Bergmann	15	21	13	19
(Japan) Tomita	21	18	21	21
(Japan) Nohira	15	24	16	21	22
(India) Nagaraj	21	22	21	14	20
(Japan) Kawai	21	8	13	19
(Japan) Tanaka	18	21	21	21

Semifinals
(Japan) Ogimura	21	21	17	24
(Japan) Tomita	19	9	21	22
(Japan) Nohira	21	17	21	21
(Japan) Tanaka	13	21	6	18

Final
(Japan) Ogimura	21	22	21	18	21
(Japan) Tanaka	13	24	18	21	13

== See also ==
List of World Table Tennis Championships medalists
