= 1956 World Table Tennis Championships – Mixed doubles =

1956 Mixed doubles

The 1956 World Table Tennis Championships mixed doubles was the 23rd edition of the mixed doubles championship.

Erwin Klein and Leah Neuberger defeated Ivan Andreadis and Ann Haydon in the final by three sets to two.

== Results ==
Round of 16
(Czechoslovakia) Ivan Andreadis (England) Ann Haydon	21	21	21
(Japan) Keisuke Tsunoda (Japan) Shizuki Narahara	14	19	19
(Japan) Koichii Hirose (Japan) Chiyoko Yamamoto	21	21	21
(Australia) Geoff Jennings (Japan) Chieko Ikuno	17	12	14
(Romania) Toma Reiter (Romania) Ella Zeller	23	21	21	21
(Australia) Phil Anderson (Japan) Kazuko Ito-Yamaizumi	21	23	17	10
(Japan) Ichiro Ogimura (Japan) Kiiko Watanabe	21	21	21
(Japan) Kazuo Kawai (Japan) Kiyoko Tasaka	9	12	9
(Japan) Toshiaki Tanaka (Japan) Tomi Okawa	21	20	20	21	21
(Romania) Matei Gantner (Romania) Angelica Rozeanu	17	22	22	13	14
(United States) Erwin Klein (United States) Leah Neuberger	21	21	21
(Japan) Seiji Yamada (Japan) Taeko Namba	19	18	17
(Japan) Yoshio Tomita (Japan) Fujie Eguchi	21	21	17	21
(Hong Kong) Lau Sik Fong (Hong Kong) Lau Wai Lim	15	14	21	14
(Japan) Motoo Fujii (Japan) Yoshiko Tanaka	21	21	20	21
(England) Johnny Leach (England) Diane Rowe	18	11	22	14

Quarterfinals
(Czechoslovakia) Andreadis (England) Haydon	21	21	21
(Japan) Hirose (Japan) Yamamoto	18	18	16
(Romania) Reiter (Romania) Zeller	11	21	17	21	21
(Japan) Ogimura (Japan) Watanabe	21	10	21	9	14
(Japan) Tanaka (Japan) Okawa	19	16	21	4
(United States) Klein (United States) Neuberger	21	21	13	21
(Japan) Tomita (Japan) Eguchi	11	21	16	21	21
(Japan) Fujii (Japan) Tanaka	21	18	21	16	23

Semifinals
(Czechoslovakia) Andreadis (England) Haydon	21	22	21
(Romania) Reiter (Romania) Zeller	13	20	14
(United States) Klein (United States) Neuberger	21	15	22	21
(Japan) Fujii (Japan) Tanaka	16	21	20	18

Final
(Czechoslovakia) Andreadis (England) Haydon	18	21	18	21	14
(United States) Klein (United States) Neuberger	21	17	21	17	21

== See also ==
List of World Table Tennis Championships medalists
