= 1957 World Table Tennis Championships – Women's doubles =

1957 Women's doubles

The 1957 World Table Tennis Championships women's doubles was the 23rd edition of the women's doubles championship. Lívia Mossóczy and Agnes Simon defeated Diane Rowe and Ann Haydon in the final by three sets to two.

== Results ==
Round of 16
(Romania) Ella Zeller (Romania) Angelica Rozeanu	21	21	21
(Netherlands) Did Heederik (Netherlands) Ursula Artz	8	8	12
(West Germany) Hanne Schlaf (West Germany) Uschi Fiedler	21	21	21
(England) Molly Jones (Netherlands) Anneke Lahey	15	18	12
(Hungary) Lívia Mossóczy (Hungary) Agnes Simon	21	21	21
(Scotland) Helen Houliston (Scotland) Alison Lindsay	12	10	9
(Japan) Taeko Namba (Japan) Tomi Okawa	21	21	21
(England) Joy Owens (England) Deidre Fearon	6	11	6
(England) Ann Haydon-Jones (England) Diane Rowe	21	21	21
(France) Christiane Watel-Mathieu (France) Claude Rougagnou	15	6	15
(South Korea) Wie Sang Sook (South Korea) Choi Kyung-ja	21	21	21
(Austria) Gertrude Hubl (Austria) Hilde Scheiner	17	7	11
(Sweden) Siv Pettersson (Sweden) Ing-Britt Molin	21	21	21
(Romania) Maria Golopenta (Scotland) Helen Elliot	7	17	8
(Japan) Kiiko Watanabe (Japan) Fujie Eguchi	18	21	22	21
(Hungary) Éva Kóczián (Hungary) Ilona Kerekes	21	13	20	16

Quarterfinals
(Romania) Zeller (Romania) Rozeanu	21	21	21
(West Germany) Schlaf (West Germany) Fiedler	19	15	14
(Hungary) Mossóczy (Hungary) Simon	21	22	11	21
(Japan) Namba (Japan) Okawa	16	20	21	19
(England) Haydon-Jones (England) Rowe	17	15	21	21	21
(South Korea) Wie Sang Sook (South Korea) Choi Kyung-ja	21	21	9	19	15
(Romania) Golopenta (Scotland) Elliot	21	15	21	21
(Japan) Watanabe (Japan) Eguchi	12	21	19	16

Semifinals
(Romania) Zeller (Romania) Rozeanu	19	21	21	22	14
(Hungary) Mossóczy (Hungary) Simon	21	10	19	24	21
(England) Haydon-Jones (England) Rowe	21	21	21
(Romania) Golopenta (Scotland) Elliot	14	15	11

Final
(Hungary) Mossóczy (Hungary) Simon	14	23	21	13	21
(England) Haydon-Jones (England) Rowe	21	21	18	21	13

== See also ==
List of World Table Tennis Championships medalists
