= Tereba =

Tereba, female Terebová, is a Czech surname. Notable people with the surname include:

- Stanislav Tereba (1938–2023), Czech photojournalist
- Tere Tereba, American fashion designer, writer, and actress
- Václav Tereba (1918–1990), Czech table tennis player
