= 1957 World Table Tennis Championships – Women's singles =

1957 Women's singles

The 1957 World Table Tennis Championships women's singles was the 24th edition of the women's singles championship. Fujie Eguchi defeated Ann Haydon in the final by three sets to two, to win the title.

== Seeds ==
1. (Japan) Tomi Okawa
2. (Romania) Angelica Rozeanu
3. (Japan) Fujie Eguchi
4. (England) Ann Haydon
5. (Hungary) Gizi Farkas
6. (Japan) Kiiko Watanabe
7. (Romania) Ella Zeller
8. (Hungary) Éva Kóczián
9. (Austria) Ermelinde Wertl
10. (England) Diane Rowe
11. (Japan) Yoshio Tanaka
12. (Scotland) Helen Elliot
13. (France) Christiane Watel

== Results ==
Round of 16
(Romania) Angelica Rozeanu	21	20	21	21
(South Korea) Wie Sang Sook	11	22	14	15
(Japan) Kiiko Watanabe	21	21	21
(Hungary) Ilona Kerekes-Sólyom	16	19	12
(Hungary) Lívia Mossóczy	21	21	21
(England) Diane Rowe	6	14	16
(Japan) Fujie Eguchi	21	21	21
(Romania) Maria Golopenta	12	10	16
(England) Ann Haydon	22	21	21
(Czechoslovakia) Eliška Krejčová-Fürstová	20	12	18
(Hungary) Éva Kóczián	21	21	21
(Australia) Norma Buckland	14	18	15
(Romania) Ella Zeller	21	21	21
(Czechoslovakia) Vendula Schwarzová	17	12	10
(Austria) Gertrude Hubl	21	19	13	12
(Japan) Tomi Okawa	13	21	21	21

Quarterfinals
(Romania) Rozeanu	18	25	17	15
(Japan) Watanabe	21	23	21	21
(Hungary) Mossóczy	15	10	17
(Japan) Eguchi	21	21	21
(England) Haydon	21	16	21	18	21
(Hungary) Kóczián	10	21	14	21	12
(Romania) Zeller	21	17	21	8	21
(Japan) Okawa	14	21	19	21	13

Semifinals
(Japan) Watanabe	6	14	21	22	19
(Japan) Eguchi	21	21	15	20	21
(England) Haydon	21	21	21
(Romania) Zeller	9	14	11

Final
(Japan) Eguchi	21	24	19	21	21
(England) Haydon	14	22	21	23	19

== See also ==
List of World Table Tennis Championships medalists
