= Chuang Chia-Fu =

Chinese table tennis player (1934–2025)

Chuang Chia-Fu (Zhuang Jiafu)
Personal information
- Nationality: China
- Born: December 1934
- Died: 8 September 2025 (aged 90)
Medal record
Men's table tennis
Representing China
Bronze medal – third place	1957	Men's team

Chuang Chia-Fu (Chinese: 庄家富; December 1934 – 8 September 2025), also known as Zhuang Jiafu, was a Chinese international table tennis player.

== Table tennis career ==
Chuang won a bronze medal at the 1957 World Table Tennis Championships in the Swaythling Cup (men's team event) with Hu Ping-chuan, Chiang Yung-Ning, Wang Chuanyao and Fu Chi Fong for China.

He later became a coach and worked for the All China Sports Federation.

== Death ==
Chuang died on 8 September 2025, at the age of 90.

== See also ==
- List of table tennis players
- List of World Table Tennis Championships medalists
