= Tsen Huai-Kuang =

Chinese table tennis player (1934–2022)

Personal information
- Nationality: China
- Born: 1934
- Died: 23 December 2022 (aged 87–88)
Medal record
Men's table tennis
Representing China
Bronze medal – third place	1956	Men's Team

Tsen Huai-Kuang (Chinese: 岑淮光; 1934 – 23 December 2022) was a Chinese international table tennis player.

== Table tennis career ==
Tsen won a bronze medal at the 1956 World Table Tennis Championships in the Swaythling Cup (men's team event) with Hu Ping-chuan, Chiang Yung-Ning, Wang Chuanyao and Yang Jai-Hua for China.

== Death ==
Tsen died from COVID-19 on 23 December 2022.

== See also ==
- List of table tennis players
- List of World Table Tennis Championships medalists
