= 1956 World Table Tennis Championships – Women's team =

1956 Corbillon Cup (women's team)

The 1956 World Table Tennis Championships – Corbillon Cup (women's team) was the 16th edition of the women's team championship.

Romania won the gold medal with a perfect 7–0 match record, England won the silver medal and Japan won the bronze medal.

== Medalists ==
Event	Gold	Silver	Bronze
	Romania; Angelica Rozeanu; Ella Zeller	England; Ann Haydon; Diane Rowe; Jill Rook	Japan; Fujie Eguchi; Tomi Okawa; Yoshiko Tanaka; Kiiko Watanabe

== Final table ==
Pos	Team	P	W	L	Pts
1	Romania	7	7	0	7
2	England	7	6	1	6
3	Japan	7	5	2	5
4	United States	7	4	3	4
5	South Korea	7	3	4	3
6	China	7	2	5	2
7	Hong Kong	7	1	6	1
8	India	7	0	7	0

== Decisive Group Match ==
Romania 3		England 1	Score
Zeller	lost to	Haydon	9–21 21–23
Rozeanu	bt	Haydon	19–21 21–18 21–18
Rozeanu	bt	Rowe D	21–11 21–18
Rozeanu & Zeller	bt	Haydon & Rowe D	21–19 21–14

== See also ==
List of World Table Tennis Championships medalists
