= 1957 World Table Tennis Championships – Women's team =

17th edition of the Women's World Table Tennis Championships

1957 Corbillon Cup (women's team)

The 1957 World Table Tennis Championships – Corbillon Cup (women's team) was the 17th edition of the women's team championship.

Japan won the gold medal, Romania won the silver medal and China won the bronze medal.

== Medalists ==
Event	Gold	Silver	Bronze
	Japan; Fujie Eguchi; Taeko Namba; Tomie Okawa; Kiiko Watanabe	Romania; Maria Golopenta; Angelica Rozeanu; Ella Zeller	China; Chiu Chung-Hui; Sun Mei-ying; Yei Pei-chun

== Final tables ==
=== Group 1 ===
Pos	Team	P	W	L	Pts
1	Romania	8	8	0	8
2	South Korea	8	7	1	7
3	(Socialist Federal Republic of Yugoslavia) Yugoslavia	8	5	3	5
3	Sweden	8	5	3	5
3	France	8	5	3	5
6	Poland	8	3	5	3
7	(Republic of Ireland) Ireland	8	2	6	2
8	Austria	8	1	7	1
8	Finland	8	0	8	0

=== Group 2 ===
Pos	Team	P	W	L	Pts
1	Japan	5	5	0	5
2	Hungary	5	4	1	4
3	Scotland	5	3	2	3
4	Czechoslovakia	5	2	3	2
5	West Germany	5	1	4	1
6	Italy	5	0	5	0

=== Group 3 ===
Pos	Team	P	W	L	Pts
1	China	8	8	0	8
2	England	8	7	1	7
3	Wales	8	6	2	6
4	United States	8	5	3	5
5	Belgium	8	4	4	4
6	Denmark	8	3	5	3
7	Switzerland	8	2	6	2
8	Netherlands	8	1	7	1
8	Norway	8	0	8	0

=== Final Group ===
Pos	Team	P	W	L	Pts
1	Japan	2	2	0	2
2	Romania	2	1	1	1
3	China	2	0	2	0

== Final Group Matches ==
Romania 3		China 2	Score
Rozeanu	bt	Yei Pei-chun	21–10 17–21 21–9
Rozeanu	bt	Sun Mei-ying	21–10 21–18
Zeller	lost to	Sun Mei-ying	7–21 21–17 17–21
Zeller	lost to	Yei Pei-chun	21–13 16–21 15–21
Rozeanu & Zeller	bt	Sun Mei-ying & Chiu Chung-Hui	21–16 21–13

Japan 5		China 0	Score
Eguchi	bt	Chiu Chung-Hui	21–11 21–14
Okawa	bt	Sun Mei-ying	21–14 21–18
Okawa	bt	Chiu Chung-Hui	13–21 21–19 22–20
Eguchi	bt	Sun Mei-ying	21–9 15–21 21–17
Eguchi & Watanabe	bt	Sun Mei-ying & Chiu Chung-Hui	21–12 21–13

Japan 3		Romania 0	Score
Watanabe	bt	Zeller	21–12 21–18
Eguchi	bt	Rozeanu	21–14 21–16
Eguchi & Watanabe	bt	Rozeanu & Zeller	19–21 21–19 21–19

== See also ==
List of World Table Tennis Championships medalists
