= 1956 World Table Tennis Championships – Women's singles =

1956 Women's singles

The 1956 World Table Tennis Championships women's singles was the 23rd edition of the women's singles championship. Tomi Okawa defeated Kiiko Watanabe in the final by three sets to two, to win the title.

== Results ==
Round of 16
(Japan) Tomi Okawa	21	21	20	21
(Japan) Kiyoko Tasaka	14	10	22	13
(South Korea) Wie Sang Sook	21	21	21
(Japan) Chizuko Suda	16	13	6
(England) Ann Haydon	21	21	21
(Japan) Kikuko Yamakawa	7	6	6
(Japan) Fujie Eguchi	21	21	21
(Japan) Chicko Ikuno	18	16	8
(Romania) Ella Zeller	18	21	21	21
(Japan) Shizuyo Narahara	21	13	16	13
(England) Diane Rowe	21	21	23
(Japan) Taeko Namba	12	9	21
(Hong Kong) Baguio Wong	21	21	21
(Japan) Hideko Nakayama	15	14	9
(China) Chiu Chung-Hui	14	22	23	13
(Japan) Kiiko Watanabe	21	20	25	21

Quarterfinals
(Japan) Okawa	21	21	21
(South Korea) Wie Sang Sook	16	17	10
(Japan) Eguchi	21	22	21
(England) Haydon	13	20	16
(Romania) Zeller	21	21	21
(England) Rowe D	8	8	17
(Hong Kong) Baguio Wong	12	21	22	21	19
(Japan) Watanabe	21	17	24	12	21

Semifinals
(Japan) Okawa	21	16	21	17	21
(Japan) Eguchi	17	21	15	21	13
(Romania) Zeller	21	21	21	16	15
(Japan) Watanabe	16	14	23	21	21

Final
(Japan) Okawa	21	13	23	9	21
(Japan) Watanabe	15	21	21	21	16

== See also ==
List of World Table Tennis Championships medalists
