= Koyo Bear =

Japanese sports shoe company

- Industry: Footwear
- Founded: 1952; 74 years ago
- Headquarters: Kobe, Japan
- Products: Sneakers
- Website: www.koyobear.com

Koyo Bear (コーヨーベアー, Kōyō Beā) is a Japanese sports shoe company.

== Table tennis shoes ==
The Koyo Bear brand is credited with having created the first purpose built table tennis shoe called the Sharpman. The Sharpman was introduced to the market in cooperation with Japanese table tennis player and world champion Ichiro Ogimura who also designed the shoe. As a table tennis expert Ogimura customized the Sharpman for the special needs of table tennis players focusing on features like grip, lightness and comfort. The white canvas shoe had two parallel running blue lines bordering the lace eyelets as well as the upper edge of the ankle- and heel-part.

Wearers of the Sharpman included Shigeo Itoh, Stellan Bengstsson, Hans Alser, Kjell Johansson, George Braithwaite and Pak Yung Sun. Koyo Bear was the footwear outfitter of the U.S. Table Tennis National Team during the 1969 World Table Tennis Championships in Munich. In addition, the Sharpman was worn by Glenn Cowan who was one of the key figures in an event that was triggered during the 1971 World Table Tennis Championships in Nagoya and became historically known as the “Ping-pong Diplomacy”.

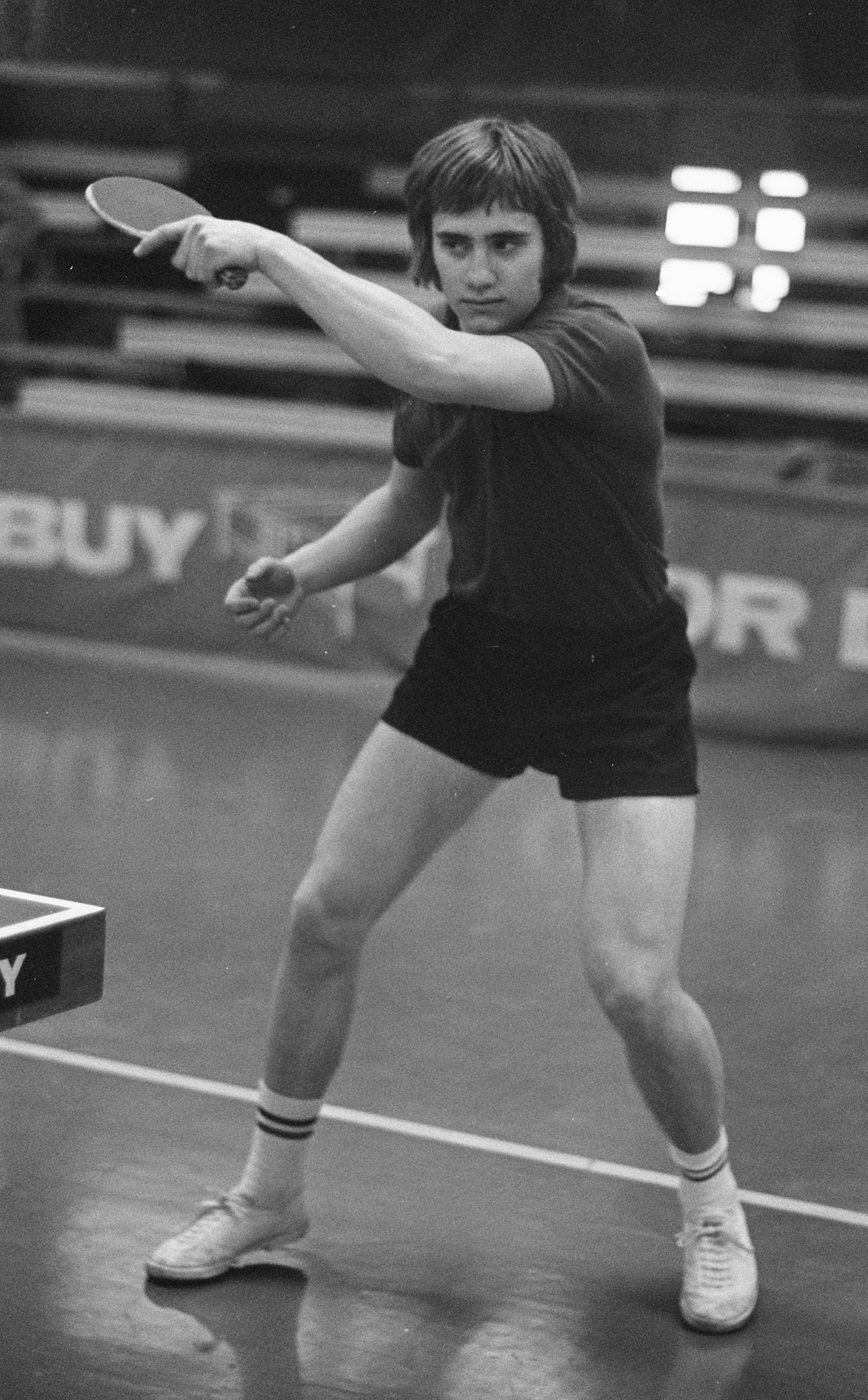
Stellan Bengtsson with Sharpman Shoe

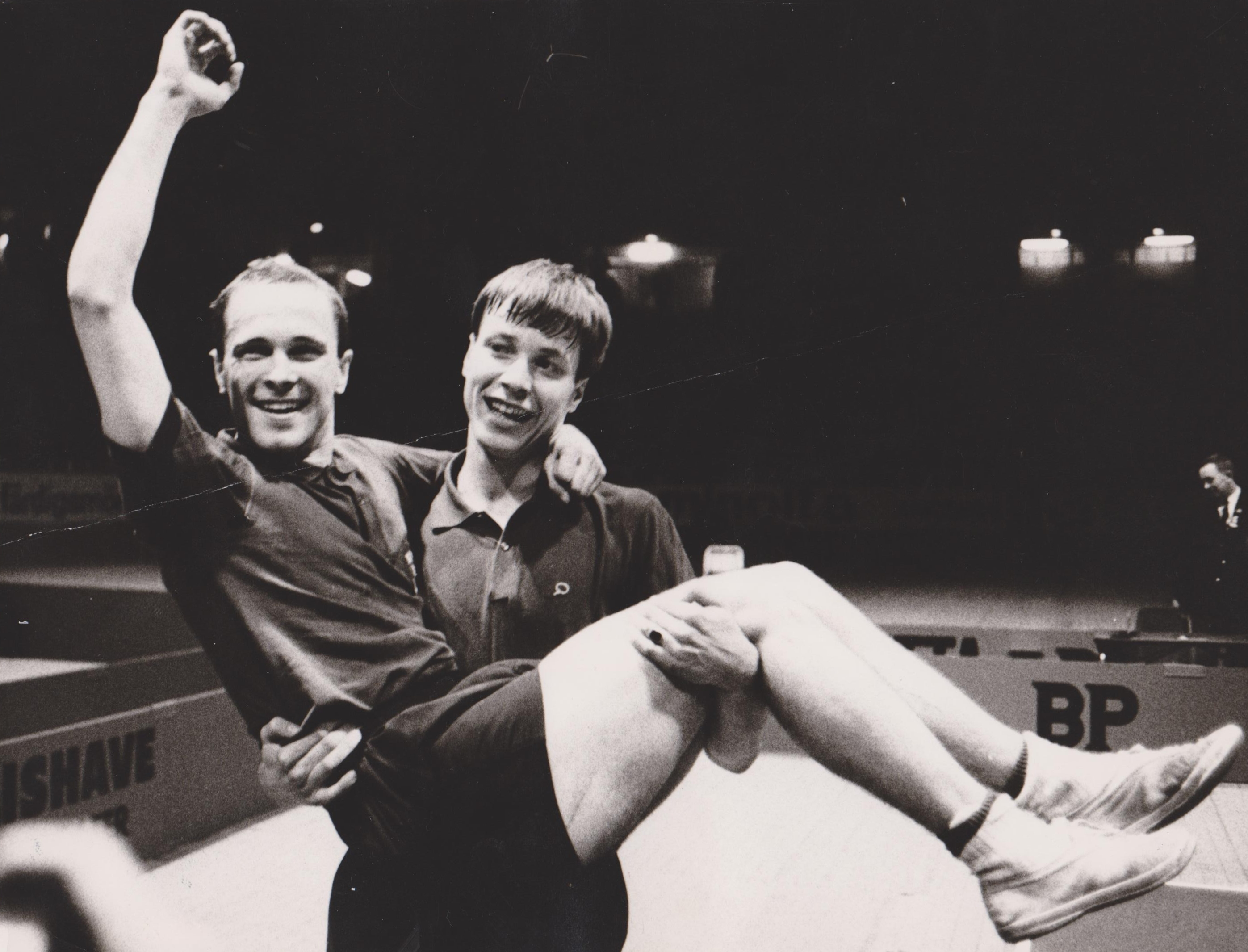
Hans Alser wearing Koyo Bear Sharpman and Kjell Johansson

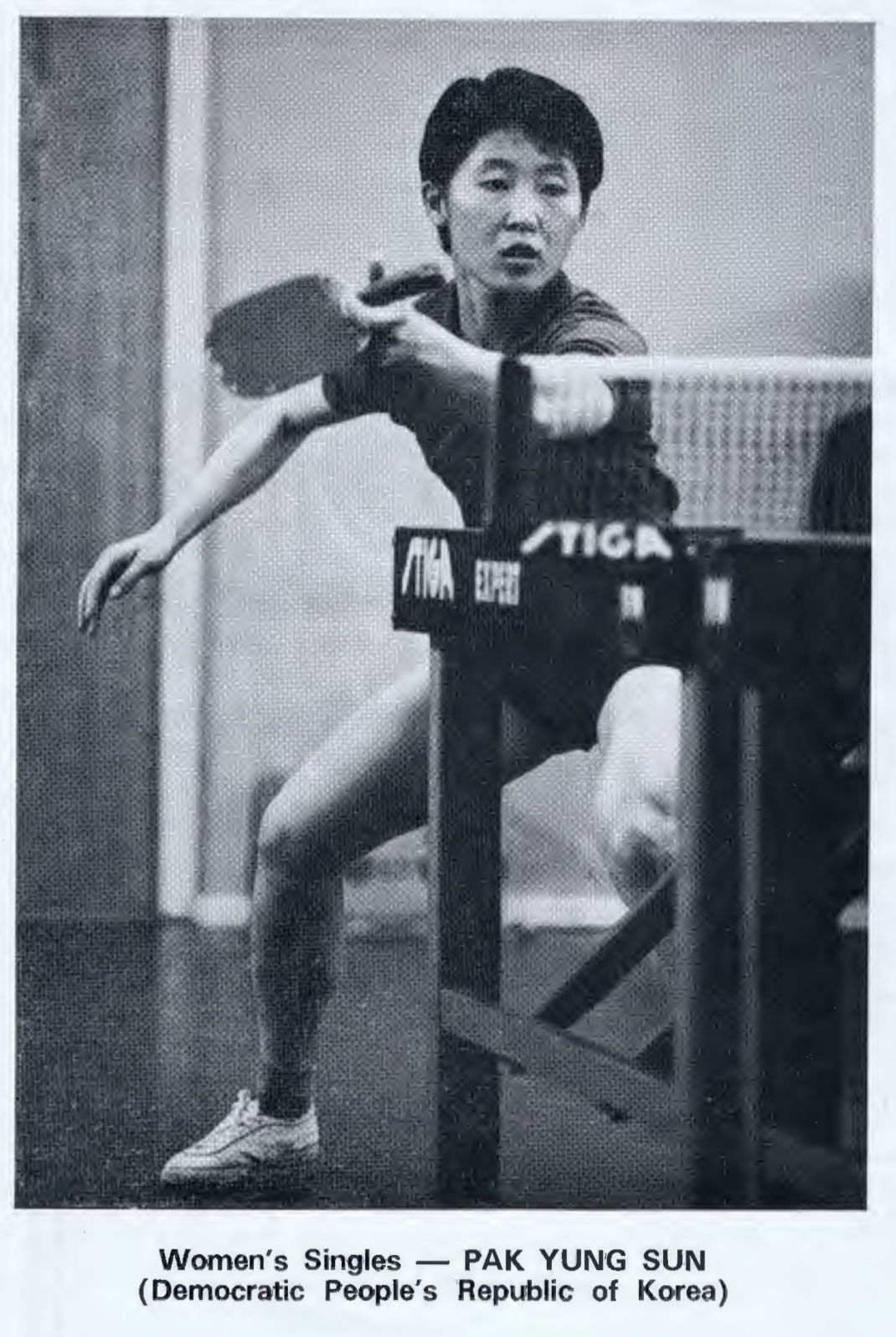
Pak Yung Sun wearing Koyo Bear Sharpman Table Tennis Shoe

Ogimura wore the shoes when he was a touring champion.

In Britain the Koyo Bear Sharpman was also marketed in cooperation with the table tennis equipment brand Joola. The shoes that were released with Joola were simply called “Koyo Bear Shoes” and were in addition to the Koyo Bear logo also branded with the Joola-logo.

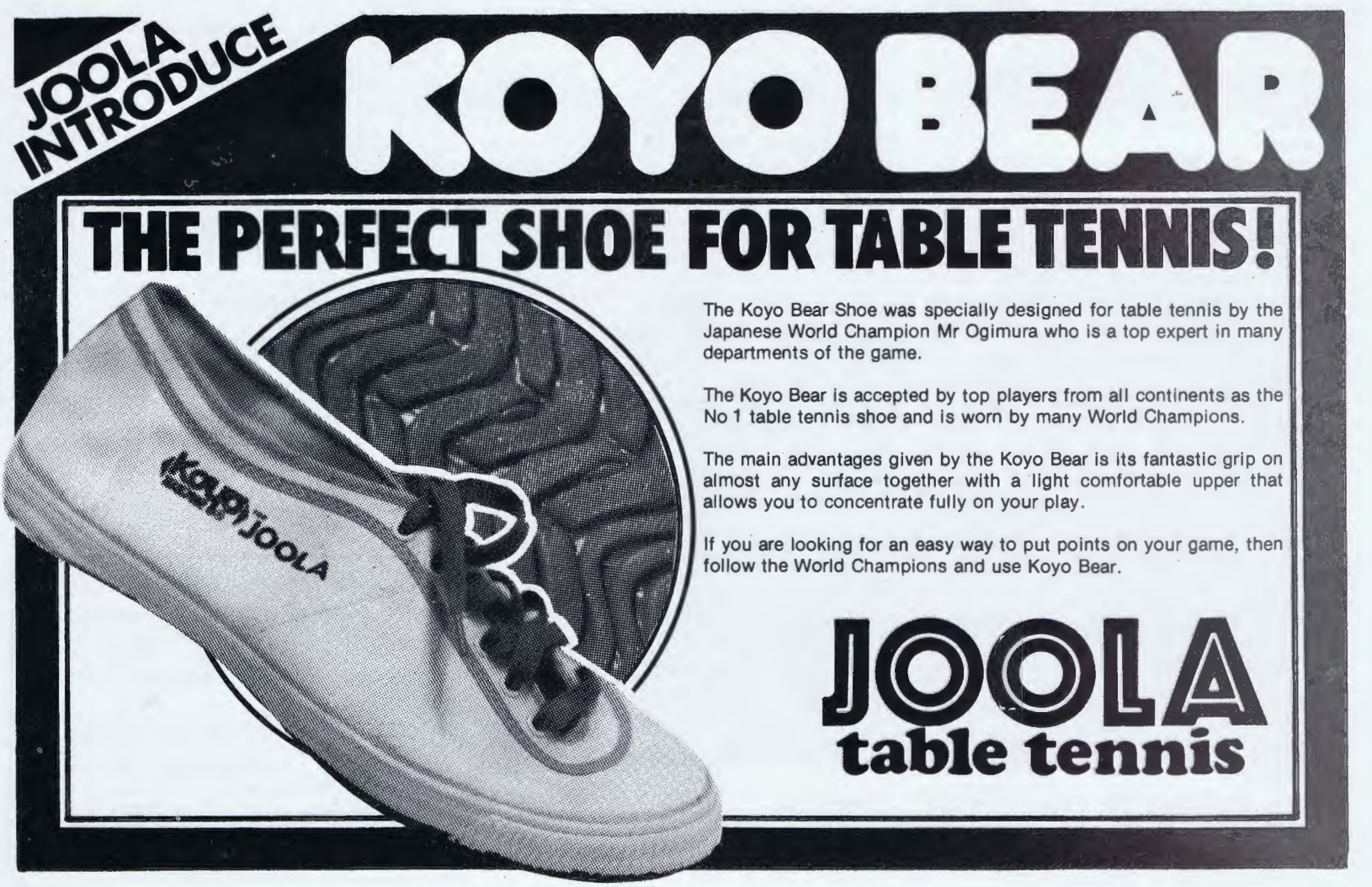
Koyo Bear Sharpman designed by Ichiro Ogimura old advertisement

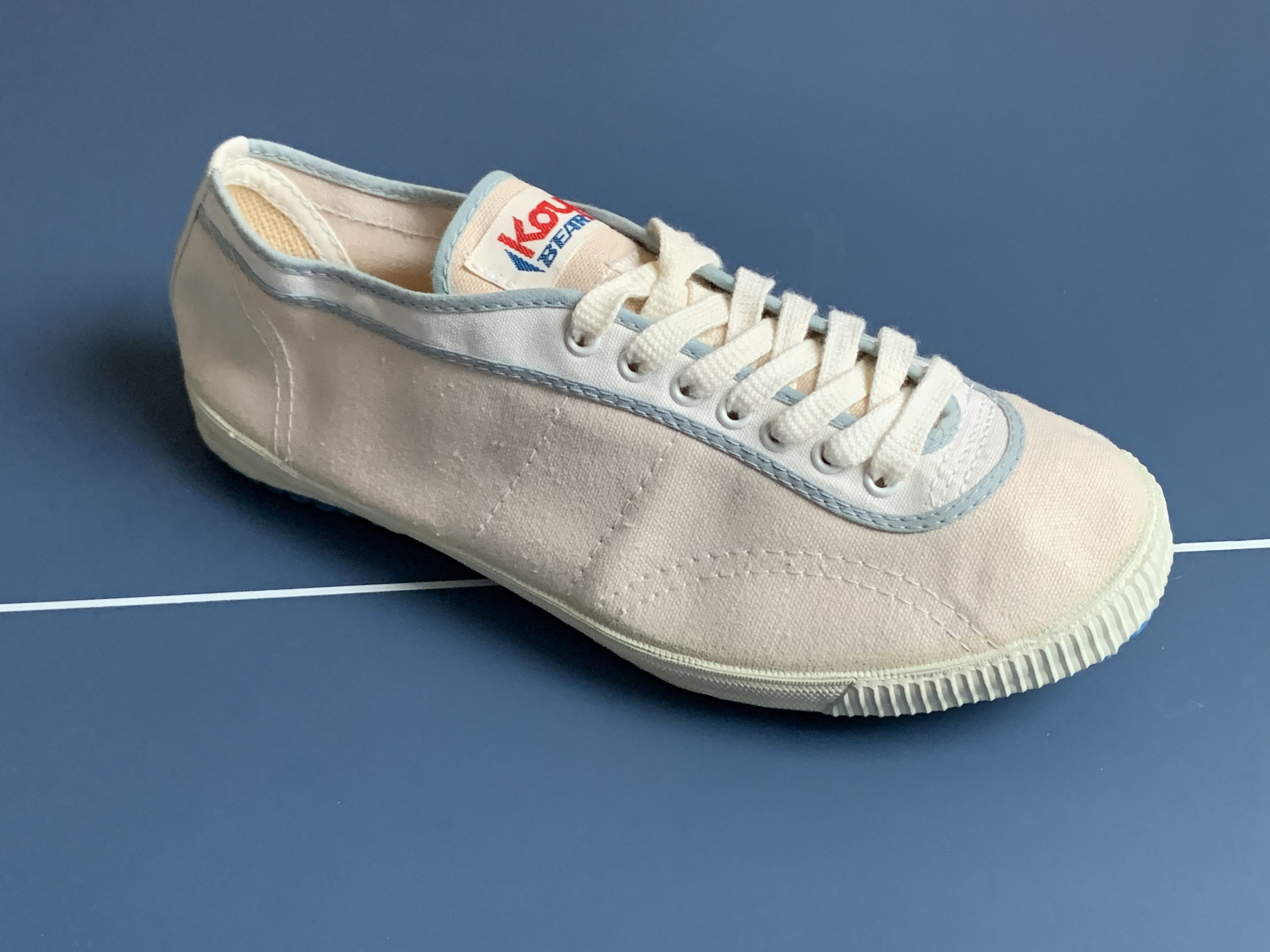
Vintage Koyo Bear Sharpman Table Tennis Shoe

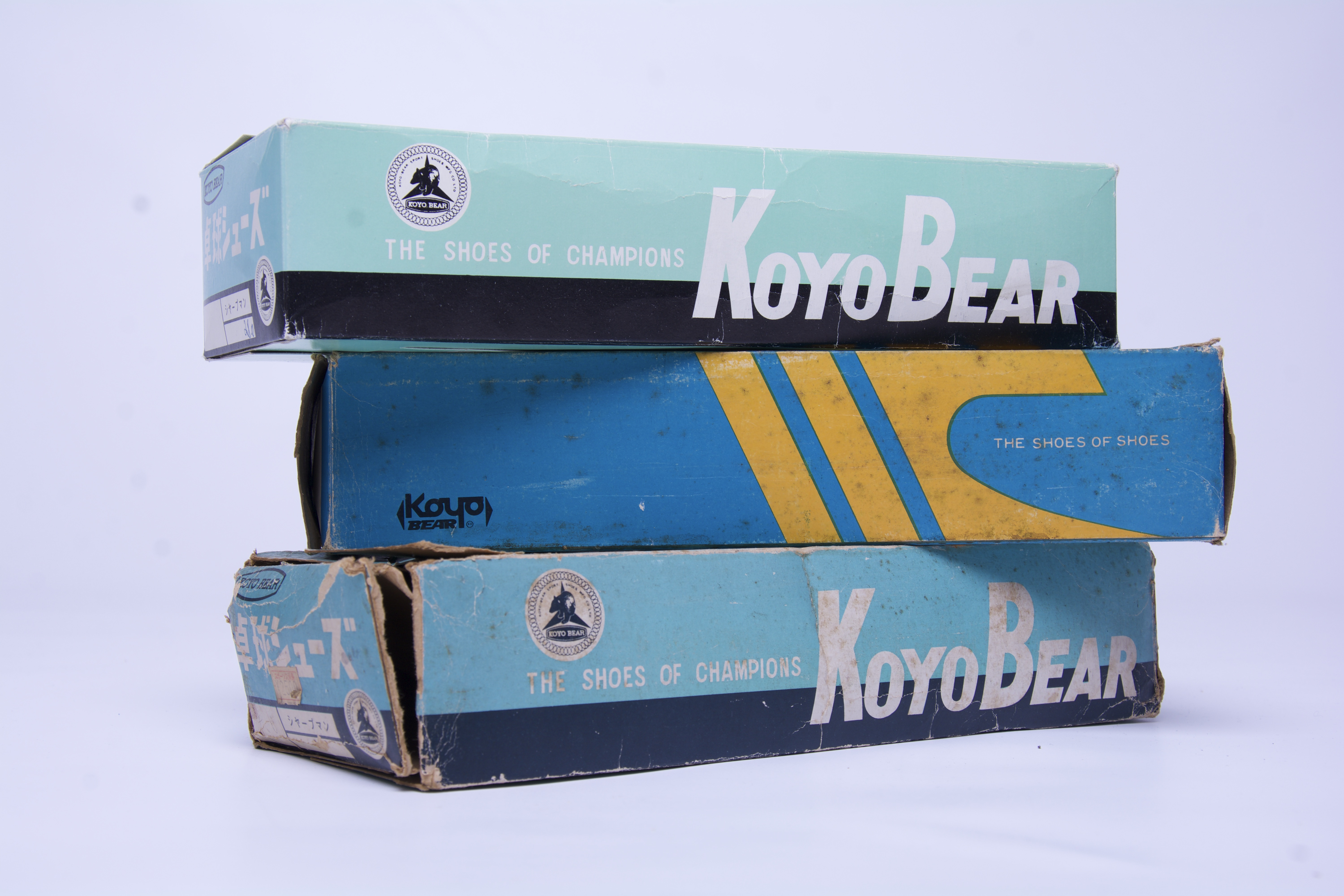
Vintage Koyo Bear Shoe Boxes

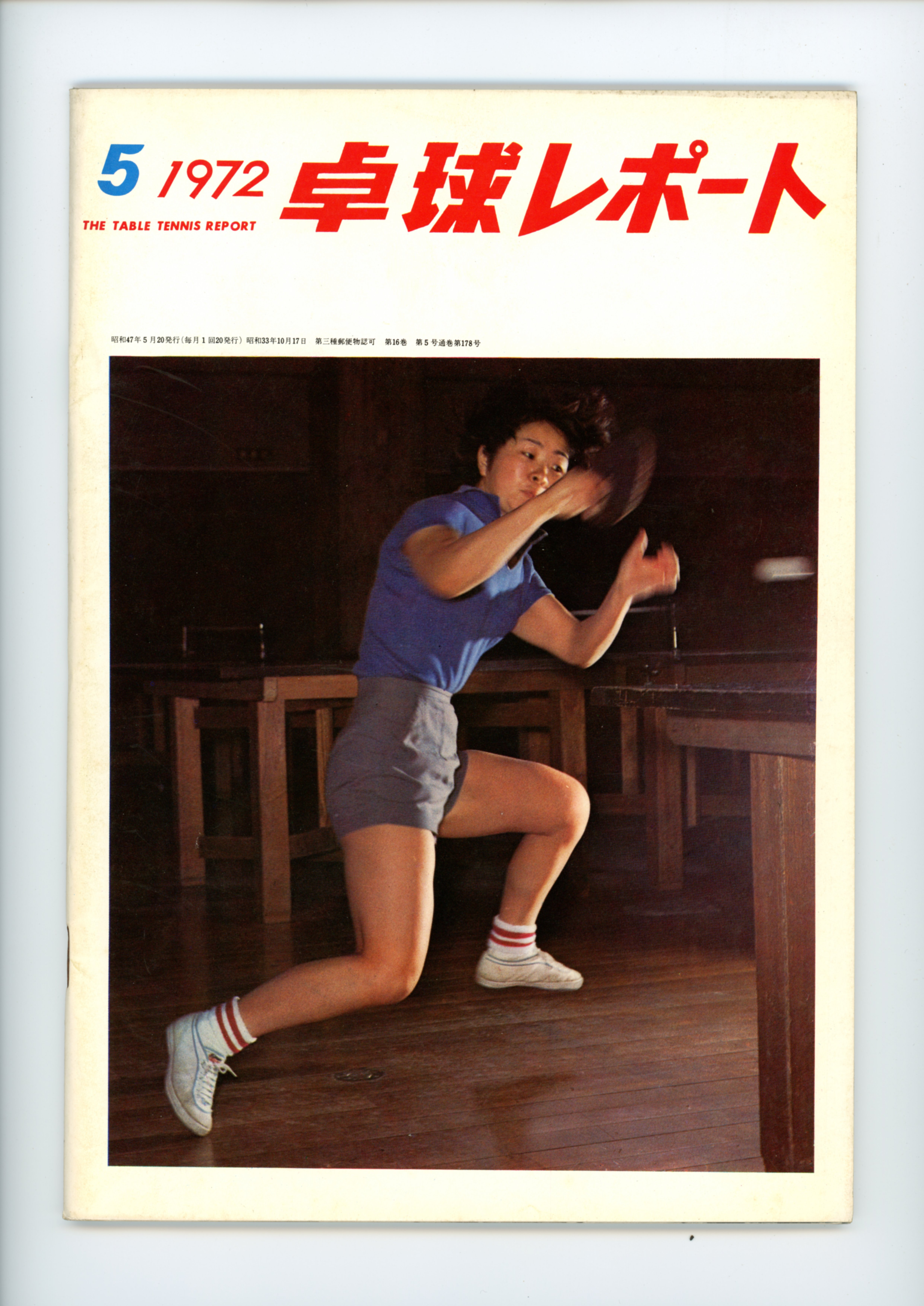
Cover Table Tennis Report 1972 Issue 5 Sharpman Koyo Bear Shoe

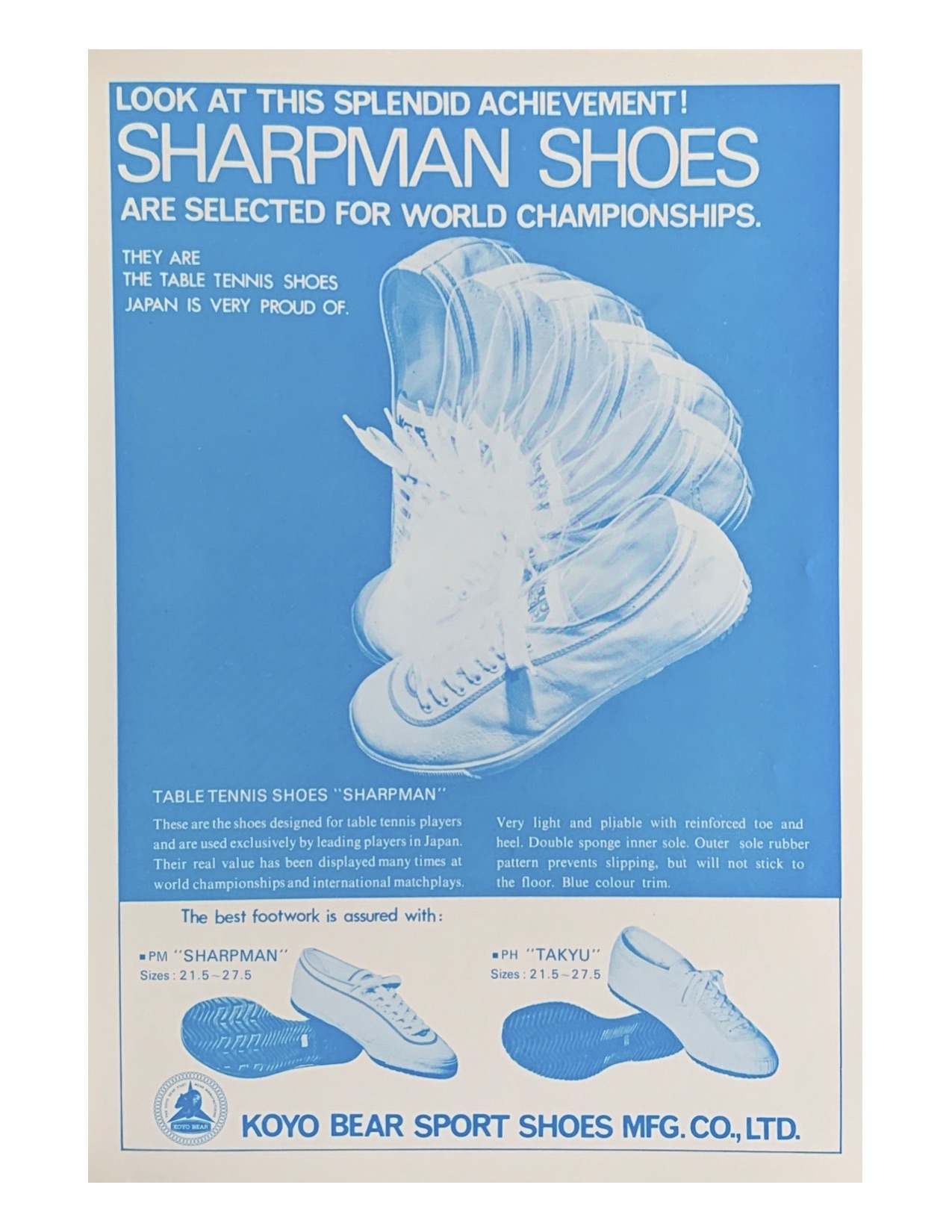
Koyo Bear Sharpman Advertisement Table Tennis Journal Issue 10 1972

== Other sports ==
Beyond table tennis shoes the brand also produced athletic shoes for a range of other sports like basketball.

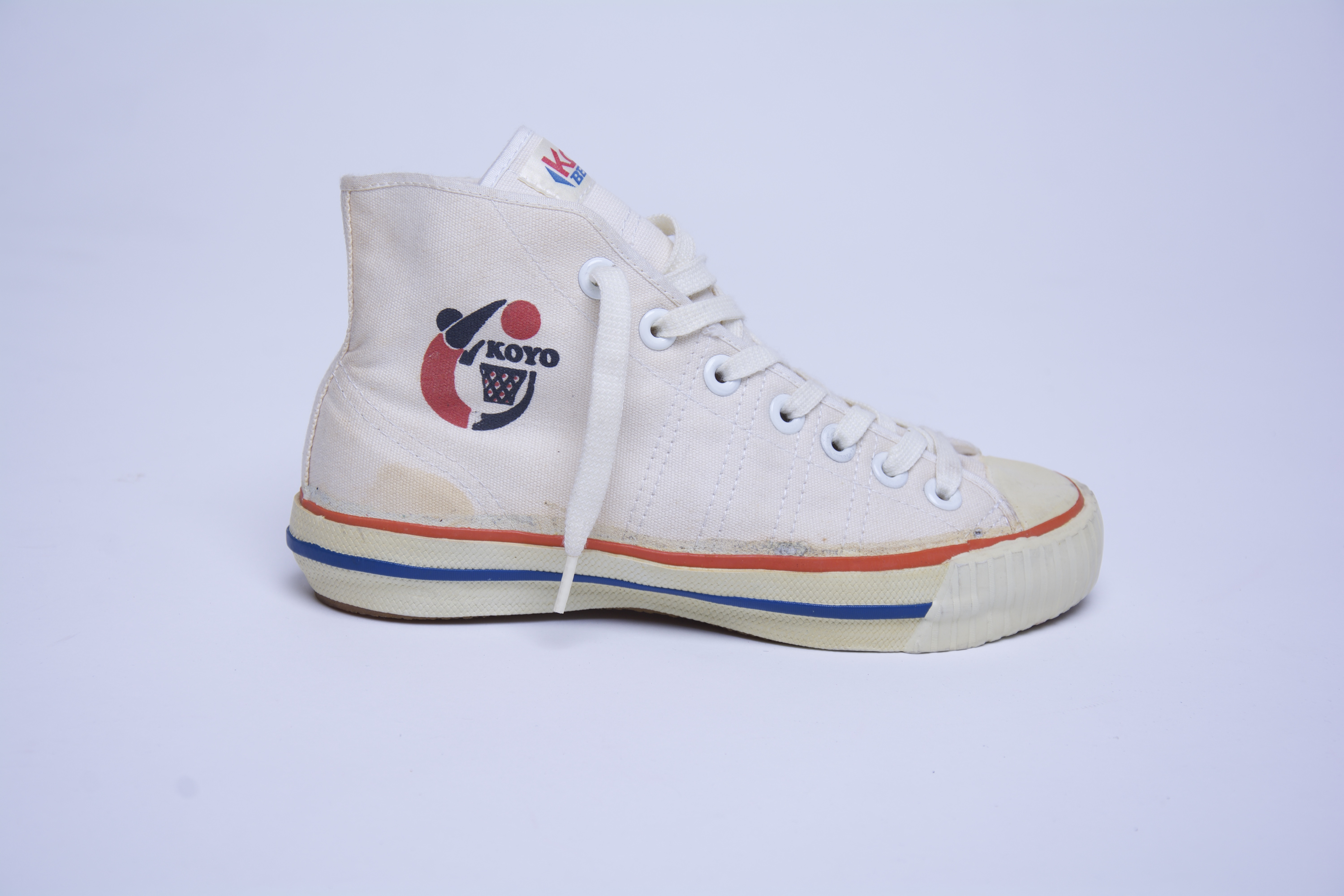
Koyo Bear Basketball Shoe

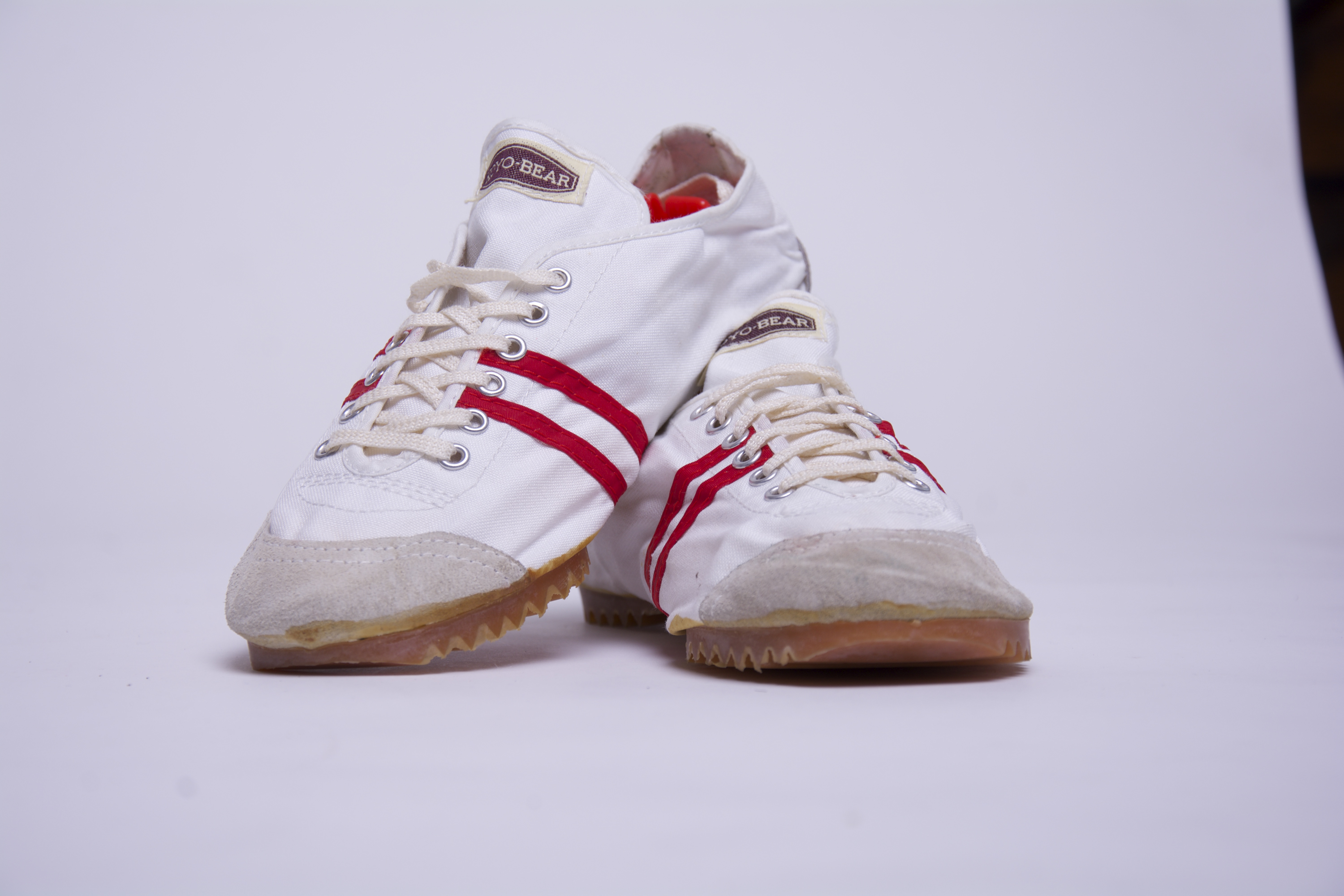
Koyo Bear Running Shoe
