= Jill Rook =

British table tennis player

Jill Rook (Mills)
Personal information
- Nationality: England
- Born: 1936
- Died: 2019 (aged 82–83)
- Education: Wimbledon High School
Medal record
Representing England
World Table Tennis Championships
| Silver medal – second place | 1956 | Women's Team |

Jill Rook (married name Mills) is a former international table tennis and tennis player from England.

== Table tennis career ==
Rook won a silver medal at the 1956 World Table Tennis Championships in the Corbillon Cup (women's team event) with Diane Rowe and Ann Haydon for England.

Rook also won a gold medal in the team event at the European Table Tennis Championships and won two English National Table Tennis Championships titles.

== Tennis career ==
Rook appeared at the Wimbledon tennis championships from 1955 to 1965.

== Personal life ==
Rook married Alan Mills in 1960.

== See also ==
- List of England players at the World Team Table Tennis Championships
- List of World Table Tennis Championships medalists
