= Stanislav Tereba =

Czech photojournalist (1938–2023)

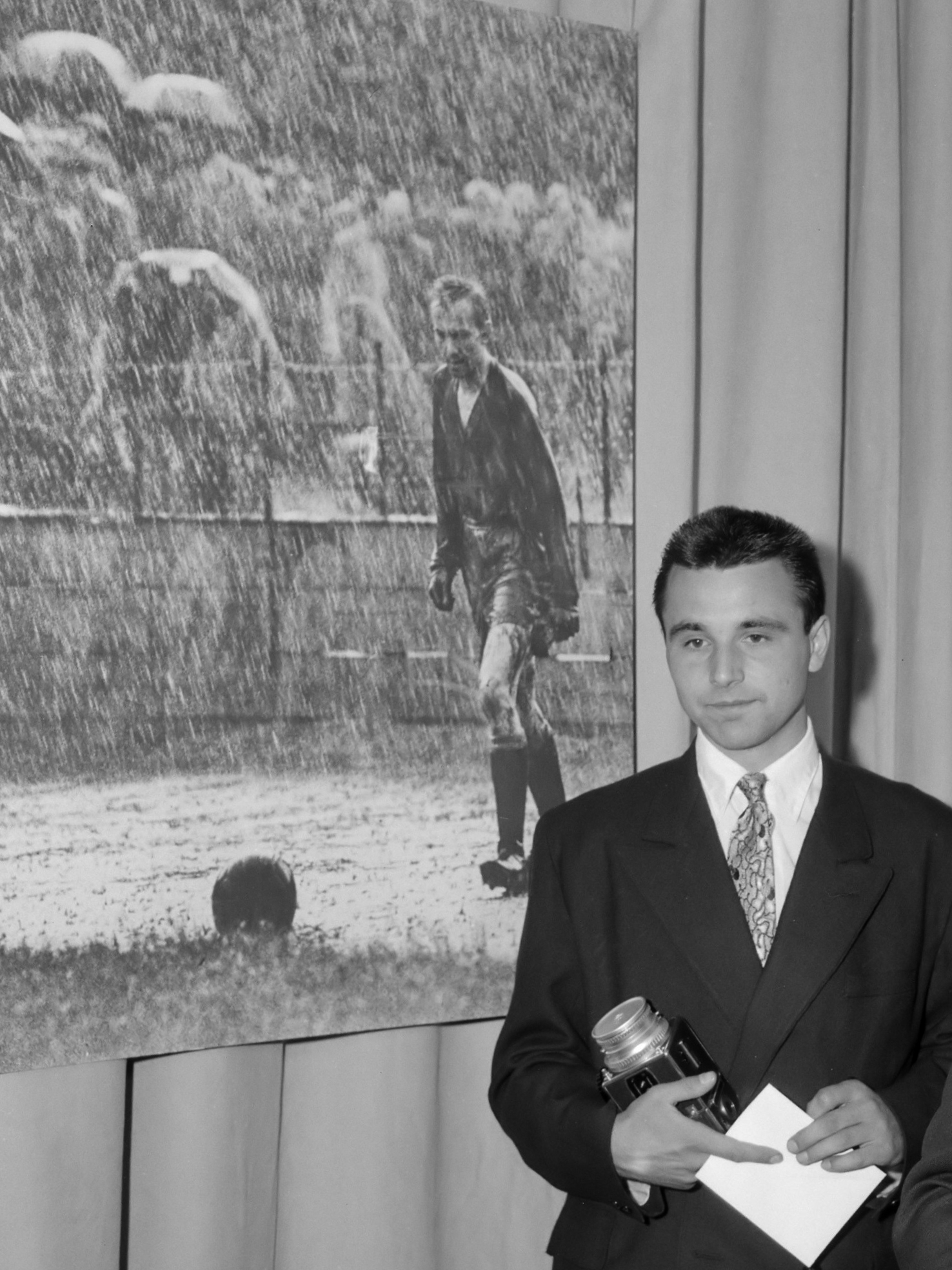
Tereba in 1959

Stanislav Tereba (2 January 1938 – 17 January 2023) was a Czech photojournalist.

== Life ==
Tereba was born in Prague on 2 January 1938. His father, Václav Tereba, was an international table tennis player.

Tereba won the World Press Photo of the Year award in 1958. During that year, on a rainy day, he captured an image of Miroslav Čtvrtníček, a Czech goalkeeper, who was either due to the weather or to the loss of his team miserable at that time.

From 1960 to 1990 Tereba worked for the newspaper Večerní Praha. In 1968 he began participating in the Prague Spring. In 1976 he took photos of the Czechoslovakia’s victory in the European Championships, especially of Antonín Panenka. Since 1990 he worked as photojournalist for publications such as Večerník Praha, Občanský denník, Dobrý večerník and Magazin Sport plus. From 1997 until 2003 he was a freelancing photojournalist.

Tereba died on 17 January 2023, at the age of 85.
