= Fu Chi Fong =

Chinese table tennis player

Fu Chi Fong (Fu Qifang)
Personal information
- Nationality: Hong Kong China
- Born: 1923
- Died: 16 April 1968 (aged 44–45)

Sport
- Sport: Table tennis
Medal record
Men's table tennis
Representing Hong Kong
World Championships
Bronze medal – third place	1952 Bombay	Team
Asian Championships
Bronze medal – third place	1952 Singapore	Singles
Gold medal – first place	1952 Singapore	Doubles
Gold medal – first place	1952 Singapore	Team
Representing China
World Championships
Bronze medal – third place	1957 Stockholm	Team

Fu Chi Fong (also Fu Qifang; 傅其芳; 1923 – 16 April 1968) was a Chinese international table tennis player.

== Table tennis career ==
He won a bronze medal at the 1952 World Table Tennis Championships in the Swaythling Cup (men's team event) when representing Hong Kong. Five years later he won another bronze at the 1957 World Table Tennis Championships in the Swaythling Cup (men's team event) with Hu Ping-chuan, Chiang Yung-Ning, Wang Chuanyao and Zhuang Jiafu for China.

== Personal life ==
He was born in Yin County, Zhejiang, and lived in Hong Kong for some time before returning to mainland China. During the Cultural Revolution he, along with fellow table tennis players Jiang Yongning and Yong Guotang, was accused of being a spy simply for the fact that he was originally from Hong Kong. Due to the public humiliation and physical torture inflicted upon him, he was driven to suicide by hanging in Beijing in 1968. Chiang Yung-Ning and Yong Guaotang were also forced into suicide by the same public harassment and torture. He was politically rehabilitated in 1978.

== See also ==
- List of table tennis players
- List of World Table Tennis Championships medalists
