= Agnes Simon =

Hungarian table tennis player (1935–2020)

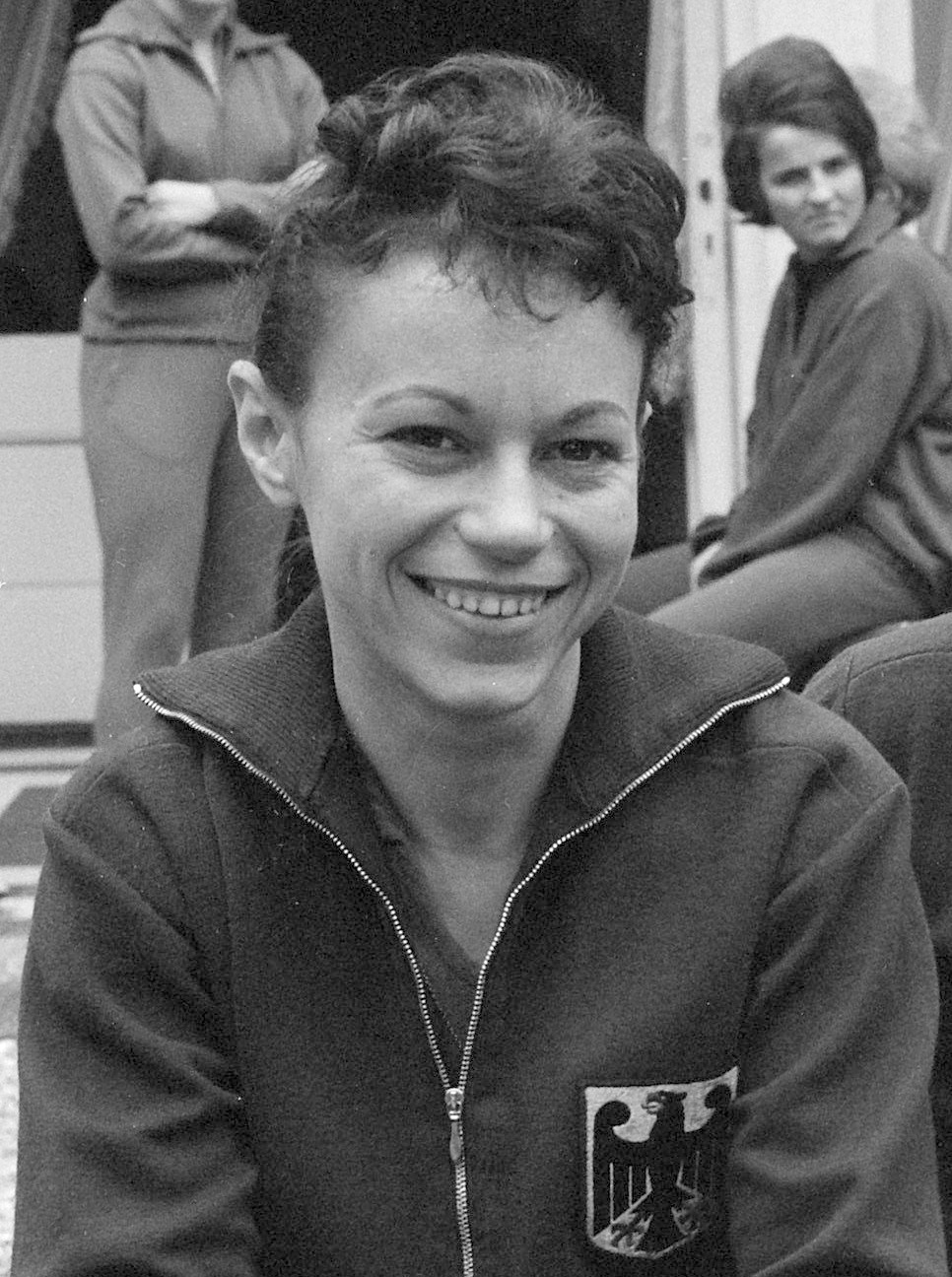
- Agnes Simon in 1962

Personal information
- Full name: Ágnes Simon-Almási
- Nationality: Hungary Netherlands West Germany
- Born: 21 June 1935 Budapest
- Died: 19 August 2020 (aged 85)

Sport
- Sport: Table tennis
Medal record
Table tennis
Representing West Germany
European Championships
| Bronze medal – third place | 1976 Prague | Doubles |
| Silver medal – second place | 1972 Rotterdam | Team |
| Silver medal – second place | 1970 Moscow | Doubles |
| Gold medal – first place | 1968 Lyon | Team |
| Bronze medal – third place | 1966 London | Doubles |
| Gold medal – first place | 1962 Berlin | Singles |
| Silver medal – second place | 1962 Berlin | Doubles |
| Silver medal – second place | 1962 Berlin | Mixed doubles |
| Gold medal – first place | 1962 Berlin | Team |
Representing Hungary
World Championships
| Gold medal – first place | 1957 Stockholm | Doubles |
| Silver medal – second place | 1954 Wembley | Team |
| Bronze medal – third place | 1953 Bucharest | Team |

Agnes Simon (née Almási; 21 June 1935 – 19 August 2020) was an international table tennis player from Hungary.

== Personal life ==
After the Hungarian Revolution of 1956, she fled to Sweden to seek political asylum, together with her husband and coach Béla Simon. They were accepted in the Netherlands and then in West Germany; thus Simon competed for the Netherlands in 1959–1960 and for West Germany since 1962.

== Table tennis career ==
From 1953 to 1976, she won several medals in singles, doubles, and team events in the Table Tennis European Championships and in the World Table Tennis Championships.

Her three World Championship medals included a gold medal in the doubles at the 1957 World Table Tennis Championships with Lívia Mossóczy.

She also won three English Open titles.

== See also ==
- List of table tennis players
- List of World Table Tennis Championships medalists
