= Motoo Fujii =

Japanese table tennis player

Personal information
- Nationality: Japan
Medal record
Representing Japan
World Table Tennis Championships
Bronze medal – third place	1956	Mixed Doubles

Motoo Fujii (藤井 基男, Fujii Motoo) is a former international table tennis player from Japan.

He won a bronze medal at the 1956 World Table Tennis Championships in the mixed doubles with Yoshiko Tanaka.

== See also ==
- List of table tennis players
- List of World Table Tennis Championships medalists
