= Akio Nohira =

Japanese table tennis player

Personal information
- Nationality: Japan
- Born: 1937
- Died: 4 February 2015 (aged 77–78)
Medal record
Representing Japan
World Table Tennis Championships
Bronze medal – third place	1956	Men's Singles

Akio Nohira (野平 明雄, Nohira Akio) (1937 - February 4, 2015) was a former Japanese international table tennis player.

He won a bronze medal at the 1956 World Table Tennis Championships in the men's singles.

== See also ==
- List of table tennis players
- List of World Table Tennis Championships medalists
