= Yang Jai-Hua =

Chinese table tennis player (born 1937)

Yang Jai-Hua (Yang Ruihua)
Personal information
- Nationality: China
- Born: 1937 (age 88–89)
Medal record
Men's table tennis
Representing China
| Bronze medal – third place | 1956 | Men's Team |
| Bronze medal – third place | 1959 | Men's Team |

Yang Jai-Hua (born 1937, also known as Yang Ruihua), is a male former international table tennis player from China.

== Table tennis career ==
He won two bronze medals at the 1956 World Table Tennis Championships and the 1959 World Table Tennis Championships in the Swaythling Cup (men's team event) for China.

== See also ==
- List of table tennis players
- List of World Table Tennis Championships medalists
