= Tiberiu Harasztosi =

Romanian table tennis player

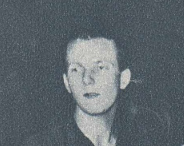

Personal information
- Nationality: Romania
Medal record
Representing Romania
World Table Tennis Championships
Bronze medal – third place	1956	Men's Team

Tiberiu Harasztosi is a former international table tennis player from Romania.

Harasztosi won a bronze medal at the 1956 World Table Tennis Championships in the Swaythling Cup (men's team event) with Toma Reiter, Matei Gantner, Paul Pesch and Mircea Popescu for Romania.

Harasztosi also won two bronze medals in the 1958 European Championships.

== See also ==
- List of table tennis players
- List of World Table Tennis Championships medalists
