= Lívia Mossóczy =

Hungarian table tennis player

Livia Mossóczy
Personal information
- Nationality: Hungary
- Born: 9 May 1936
- Died: 18 August 2017 (aged 81)

Sport
- Sport: Table tennis
Medal record
Women's table tennis
Representing Hungary
World Championships
Gold medal – first place	1957 Stockholm	Doubles
European Championships
Gold medal – first place	1960 Zagreb	Team
Bronze medal – third place	1958 Budapest	Singles
Silver medal – second place	1958 Budapest	Doubles
Bronze medal – third place	1958 Budapest	Mixed Doubles

Lívia Mossóczy (May 9, 1936 – August 18, 2017) was a female international table tennis player from Hungary.

== Table tennis career ==
From 1957 to 1960 she won several medals in single, double, and team events in the Table Tennis European Championships, three medals with the Hungarian team in the World Table Tennis Championships.

The World Championship medal was a gold medal won in the doubles at the 1957 World Table Tennis Championships with Agnes Simon.

== See also ==
- List of table tennis players
- List of World Table Tennis Championships medalists
