= Miklós Péterfy =

Hungarian table tennis player

Personal information
- Nationality: Hungary
- Born: 1936 Bekescsaba, Hungary
- Died: 2004 (aged 67–68) Budapest
Medal record
Representing Hungary
World Table Tennis Championships
Silver medal – second place	1957	Men's team
Bronze medal – third place	1961	Men's team

Miklós Péterfy is a male former international table tennis player from Hungary.

== Table tennis career ==
He won two medals at the World Table Tennis Championships from 1957 to 1961.

He won a silver medal in the Swaythling Cup (team event) at the 1957 World Table Tennis Championships and a bronze medal at the 1961 World Table Tennis Championships in the Swaythling Cup (men's team event) for Hungary.

== See also ==
- List of table tennis players
- List of World Table Tennis Championships medalists
