= Toshihiko Miyata =

Japanese table tennis player

Personal information
- Nationality: Japan
Medal record
Representing Japan
World Table Tennis Championships
Gold medal – first place	1957	team
Bronze medal – third place	1957	doubles

Toshihiko Miyata (宮田 俊彦, Miyata Toshihiko) is a Japanese former international table tennis player.

== Table tennis career ==
He won a bronze medal in the men's doubles with Keisuke Tsunoda at the 1957 World Table Tennis Championships.

He won a gold medal in the team event for Japan.

== See also ==
- List of table tennis players
- List of World Table Tennis Championships medalists
