= Hu Ping-chuan =

Chinese table tennis player (1936–2024)

Personal information
- Nationality: China
- Born: 1936
- Died: 24 August 2024 (aged 87–88)
Medal record
Men's table tennis
Representing China
World Championships
Bronze medal – third place	1956 Tokyo	Men's Team
Bronze medal – third place	1957 Stockholm	Men's Team

Hu Ping-chuan (Chinese: 胡炳权; 1936 – 24 August 2024), also known as Hu Bingquan, was an international table tennis player from the People's Republic of China. Hu died on 24 August 2024.

== Table tennis career ==
Hu won two bronze medals at the 1956 World Table Tennis Championships and 1957 World Table Tennis Championships in the Swaythling Cup (men's team event).

== See also ==
- List of table tennis players
- List of World Table Tennis Championships medalists
