= Ludvík Vyhnanovský =

Czech table tennis player

Personal information
- Nationality: Czech Republic
- Born: 20 January 1927
- Died: 24 August 2010 (aged 83)
Medal record
Representing Czechoslovakia
World Table Tennis Championships
Bronze medal – third place	1953	team
Silver medal – second place	1955	team
Silver medal – second place	1956	team
Bronze medal – third place	1956	doubles
Bronze medal – third place	1957	team
Bronze medal – third place	1957	mixed doubles
Silver medal – second place	1959	doubles

Ludvík Vyhnanovský (1927-2010) was a male Czech international table tennis player.

== Table tennis career ==
He won seven World Table Tennis Championship medals from 1953 to 1959. He won four team event medals, two men's doubles titles with Václav Tereba and Ladislav Štípek and one mixed doubles title with Helen Elliot. Ludvik was 10 times Champion of Czechoslovakia.

== Personal life ==
In 2005 he received the Czech S.C.I. Award.

== See also ==
- List of table tennis players
- List of World Table Tennis Championships medalists
