= Erwin Klein =

American table tennis player (1938–1992)

Personal information
- Full name: Erwin Klein
- Nationality: American
- Born: 6 June 1938
- Died: 30 September 1992 (aged 54) Los Angeles, California

Sport
- Sport: Table tennis
Medal record
Men's table tennis
Representing United States
World Championships
Gold medal – first place	1956 Tokyo	Mixed

Erwin Klein (June 6, 1938 - September 30, 1992) was a male table tennis player from the United States, who four times US Open Table Tennis Singles Champion. His nickname was Chubby. He won a gold medal in the Mixed Doubles event at the World Table Tennis Championships in 1956.

== Biography ==
Klein lived in Los Angeles and was Jewish. He attended Fairfax High School, UCLA and Cal-Berkeley.

He was Southern California men's champion at the age of 11. Klein won the U.S. National Boys 15-under Championship (at age 13) and the respective age groups at age 16, 17, and 18. At age 18, he also won the National Juniors title, and the National Men's Singles and Doubles Championships. In 1955, he and Richard Bergmann won the U.S. Open Table Tennis Men's Doubles Championship.

In 1956, he, 17 years old, and Leah Neuberger won the World Table Tennis Mixed Doubles Championship in Tokyo. was a four-time US Open Table Tennis Singles Champion. In 1956 and 1961, he was the U.S. singles champion. In both 1964 and 1965, he won the U.S. Open Table Tennis Men's Singles Championship, and he and Bernard Bukiet won the U.S. Open Table Tennis Men's Doubles Championship.

In 1973, he was a member of the United States table tennis team that competed against China.

In 1990, Klein was inducted into the Southern California Jewish Sports Hall of Fame.

He was shot to death in Los Angeles by a business partner in an argument on September 30, 1992. The shooter then killed himself.
