= Elemér Gyetvai =

Hungarian table tennis player

Personal information
- Nationality: Hungary
- Born: 12 July 1927
- Died: 18 March 1993 (aged 65)
Medal record
Representing Hungary
World Table Tennis Championships
Silver medal – second place	1951	Men's team
Gold medal – first place	1952	Men's team
Silver medal – second place	1953	Men's team
Silver medal – second place	1957	Men's team
Bronze medal – third place	1957	Men's doubles

Elemér Gyetvai (12 July 1927 – 18 March 1993) was an international table tennis player from Hungary.

== Table tennis career ==
He won five medals at the World Table Tennis Championships from 1951 to 1957.

His five World Championship medals included a gold medal in the Swaythling Cup (team event) at the 1952 World Table Tennis Championships.

In addition he won a bronze medal at the 1957 World Table Tennis Championships in the men's doubles with Ferenc Sidó. He also won two English Open titles.

== Coaching and Inspector ==
After retiring from playing he coached in Indonesia. In 1964 he was recruited by the Hungarian Table Tennis Federation as an international inspector to investigate the decline of Hungarian table tennis and regain European superiority.

== See also ==
- List of table tennis players
- List of World Table Tennis Championships medalists
