= Yoshio Tomita =

Japanese table tennis player

Personal information
- Nationality: Japan
- Born: 1933 (age 92–93)

Sport
- Sport: Table tennis
Medal record
Men's table tennis
Representing Japan
World Championships
| Bronze medal – third place | 1956 Tokyo | Singles |
| Gold medal – first place | 1956 Tokyo | Doubles |
| Gold medal – first place | 1956 Tokyo | Team |
| Bronze medal – third place | 1955 Utrecht | Doubles |
| Gold medal – first place | 1955 Utrecht | Team |
| Bronze medal – third place | 1954 Wembley | Doubles |
| Silver medal – second place | 1954 Wembley | Mixed |
| Gold medal – first place | 1954 Wembley | Team |

Yoshio Tomita (富田 芳雄, Tomita Yoshio) is a male former international table tennis player from Japan.

== Table tennis career ==
From 1955 to 1957 he won eight medals in singles, doubles, and team events in the World Table Tennis Championships.

The eight World Championship medals included four gold medals; one in the doubles at the 1956 World Table Tennis Championships with Ichiro Ogimura and three in the team event.

== See also ==
- List of table tennis players
- List of World Table Tennis Championships medalists
