= Chiang Yung-Ning =

Hong Kong table tennis player

Chiang Yung-Ning (Jiang Yongning)
Personal information
- Nationality: Hong Kong China
- Born: 1927
- Died: 16 May 1968 (aged 40–41)
Medal record
Men's table tennis
Representing Hong Kong
World Championships
| Bronze medal – third place | 1952 | Men's Team |
Representing China
World Championships
| Bronze medal – third place | 1956 | Men's Team |
| Bronze medal – third place | 1957 | Men's Team |
| Bronze medal – third place | 1959 | Men's Team |

Chiang Yung-Ning (1927 – 16 May 1968, also known as Keung Wing Ning or Jiang Yongning), was a Hong Kong international table tennis player who represented Hong Kong and China.

== Table tennis career ==
He won a bronze medal at the 1952 World Table Tennis Championships in the Swaythling Cup (men's team event) when representing Hong Kong. The team consisted of Cheng Kwok Wing, Chung Chin Sing, Fu Chi Fong and Suh Sui Cho. He also reached the fourth round of the singles.

The PRC recruited Chiang and in the 1950s he helped the country develop its table tennis program.

Four years later he won three bronze medals at the 1956 World Table Tennis Championships, 1957 World Table Tennis Championships and 1959 World Table Tennis Championships in the Swaythling Cup (men's team event) for China.

He was also the first National table tennis champion of China in 1952 and in 1953 defeated the defending World Champion Johnny Leach.

== Death ==
Chiang was the victim of harassment and torture during the Cultural Revolution in China. He and fellow table tennis stars Fu Chi Fong and Yong Guotang were accused of being capitalist spies simply because of their Hong Kong origin. Chiang liked to read newspapers in his spare time, which led to accusations by the rebels that he was collecting information for the capitalists and Japanese. After being forced into a confession, he killed himself on May 16 1968; Fu and Yong were also killed themselves after the same public harassment and torture.

== See also ==
- List of table tennis players
- List of World Table Tennis Championships medalists
