= Matei Gantner =

Romanian table tennis player (1934–2023)

Personal information
- Nationality: Romania
- Born: 1934
- Died: 2023 (aged 89)
Medal record
Representing Romania
World Table Tennis Championships
Bronze medal – third place	1956	Men's Team

Matei Gantner (1934–2023) was a Romanian international table tennis player.

Gantner won a bronze medal at the 1956 World Table Tennis Championships in the Swaythling Cup (men's team event) with Toma Reiter, Tiberiu Harasztosi, Paul Pesch and Mircea Popescu for Romania.

He also won the national Championships seven times, three in singles (1954, 1958, 1960), two in doubles (1955, 1957 with Toma Reiter) and two in mixed (1957 and 1958 with Ella Zeller in addition to a bronze medal in the 1958 European Championships.

Gantner died in 2023, at the age of 89.

== See also ==
- List of table tennis players
- List of World Table Tennis Championships medalists
