= Keisuke Tsunoda =

Japanese table tennis player (1933–2024)

Personal information
- Nationality: Japan
- Born: 19 January 1933
- Died: 1 September 2024 (aged 91)
Medal record
Representing Japan
World Table Tennis Championships
Gold medal – first place	1956	team
Bronze medal – third place	1956	doubles
Gold medal – first place	1957	team
Bronze medal – third place	1957	doubles
Bronze medal – third place	1957	mixed doubles

Keisuke Tsunoda (角田 啓輔, Tsunoda Keisuke; 19 January 1933 – 1 September 2024) was a Japanese international table tennis player.

== Table tennis career ==
Tsunoda won five medals in doubles, and team events in the World Table Tennis Championships.

The five World Championship medals included two gold medals in the team event for Japan.

The other three medals consisted of all bronze medals won in the doubles with Toshiaki Tanaka and Toshihiko Miyata respectively and the mixed doubles with Taeko Namba.

He also won an English Open title.

Tsunoda died on 1 September 2024, at the age of 91.

== See also ==
- List of table tennis players
- List of World Table Tennis Championships medalists
