= Václav Tereba =

Czech table tennis player

Personal information
- Nationality: Czech Republic
- Born: 21 August 1918
- Died: 22 February 1990 (aged 71)
Medal record
Representing Czechoslovakia
World Table Tennis Championships
Bronze medal – third place	1936	Men's Team
Bronze medal – third place	1937	Men's Doubles
Bronze medal – third place	1938	Men's Team
Bronze medal – third place	1938	Men's Doubles
Bronze medal – third place	1938	Mixed Doubles
Gold medal – first place	1939	Men's Team
Silver medal – second place	1939	Mixed Doubles
Gold medal – first place	1947	Men's Team
Bronze medal – third place	1947	Men's Doubles
Gold medal – first place	1950	Men's Team
Bronze medal – third place	1950	Men's Doubles
Gold medal – first place	1951	Men's Team
Bronze medal – third place	1951	Men's Singles
Bronze medal – third place	1953	Men's Team
Silver medal – second place	1954	Men's Team
Bronze medal – third place	1954	Men's Doubles
Silver medal – second place	1955	Men's Team
Silver medal – second place	1956	Men's Team
Bronze medal – third place	1956	Men's Doubles
Bronze medal – third place	1957	Men's Team

Václav Tereba (21 August 1918 – 22 February 1990), was a Czechoslovak international table tennis player.

He won twenty World Table Tennis Championship medals including four gold medals as part of the Czechoslovakia men's team event.

In addition he won four silver medals, three in the men's team event and one in the mixed doubles with Marie Kettnerová and twelve bronze medals, three in the men's team, one in the men's singles, one in the mixed doubles and six in the men's doubles with four different partners, Adolf Slar, Stanislav Kolář, Josef Turnovsky and Ludvik Vyhnanovsky.

Other achievements included victory in the open English Championships in 1947. He died in 1990 and his son is Stanislav Tereba.

== See also ==
- List of table tennis players
- List of World Table Tennis Championships medalists
