= Toma Reiter =

Romanian table tennis player

Personal information
- Nationality: Romania
Medal record
Representing Romania
World Table Tennis Championships
Bronze medal – third place	1956	Mixed Doubles
Bronze medal – third place	1956	Men's Team

Toma Reiter is a male former international table tennis player from Romania.

He won a bronze medal at the 1956 World Table Tennis Championships in the mixed doubles with Ella Zeller.

In addition he was also part of the Romanian team that won a bronze in the Swaythling Cup (men's team event).

== See also ==
- List of table tennis players
- List of World Table Tennis Championships medalists
