= Ladislav Štípek =

Czechoslovak table tennis player

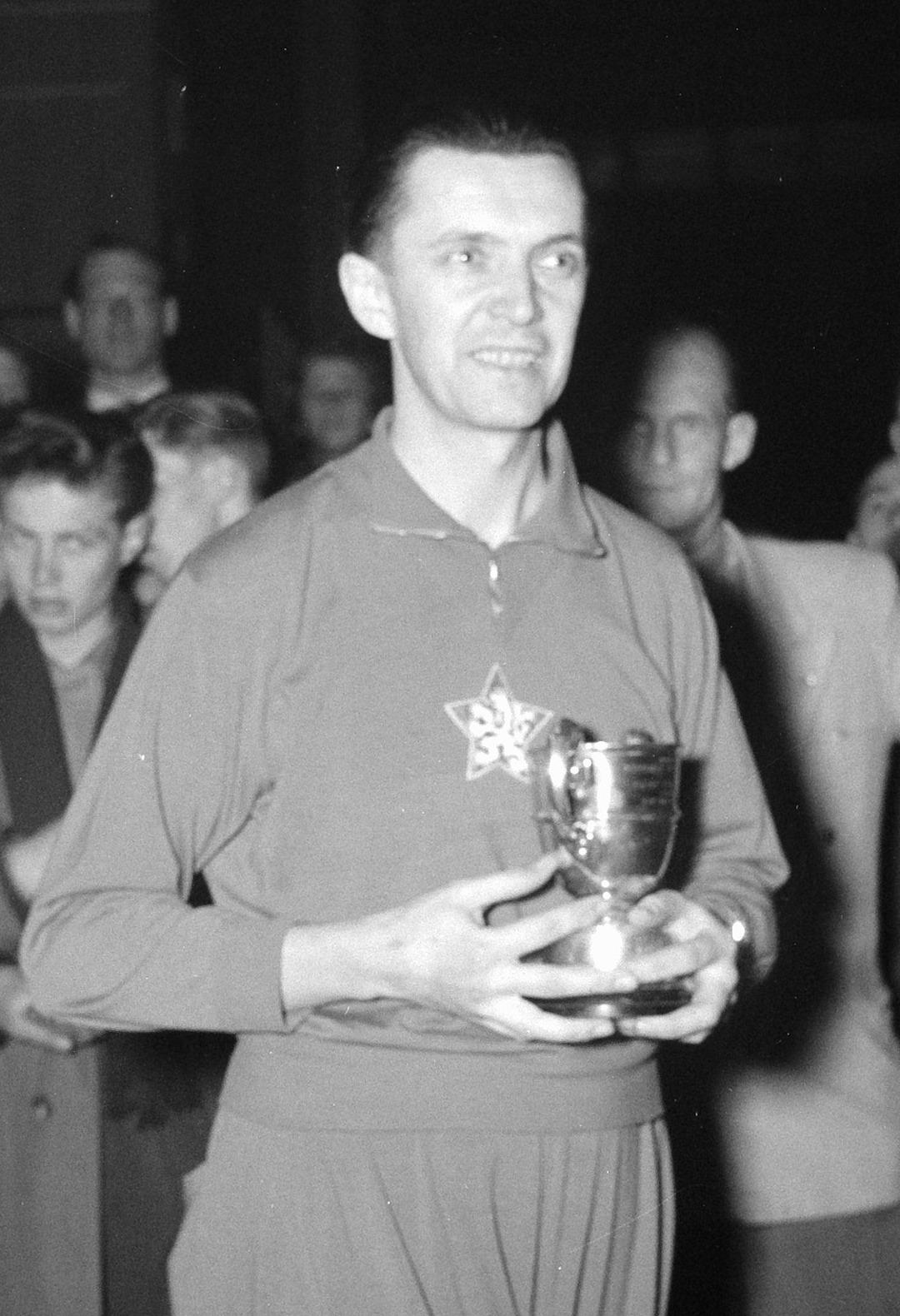
- Štípek (1955)

Personal information
- Nationality: Czechoslovakia
- Born: 10 June 1925 Prague, Czechoslovakia
- Died: 13 February 1998 (aged 72) Barcelona, Spain

Sport
- Sport: Table tennis
Medal record
Men's table tennis
Representing Czechoslovakia
World Championships
Silver medal – second place	1959 Dortmund	Doubles
Gold medal – first place	1957 Stockholm	Doubles
Bronze medal – third place	1957 Stockholm	Team
Silver medal – second place	1956 Tokyo	Doubles
Silver medal – second place	1956 Tokyo	Team
Gold medal – first place	1955 Utrecht	Doubles
Bronze medal – third place	1955 Utrecht	Mixed Doubles
Silver medal – second place	1955 Utrecht	Team
Silver medal – second place	1954 Wembley	Team
Bronze medal – third place	1953 Bucharest	Singles
Bronze medal – third place	1951 Vienna	Doubles
Gold medal – first place	1951 Vienna	Team
Bronze medal – third place	1950 Budapest	Doubles
Bronze medal – third place	1950 Budapest	Mixed Doubles
Silver medal – second place	1949 Stockholm	Doubles
Silver medal – second place	1949 Stockholm	Team
Gold medal – first place	1948 Wembley	Doubles
Gold medal – first place	1948 Wembley	Team
Bronze medal – third place	1947 Paris	Doubles
European Championships
Gold medal – first place	1958 Budapest	Doubles
Silver medal – second place	1958 Budapest	Team

Ladislav Štípek (10 June 1925 – 13 February 1998) was a Czech male international table tennis player, representing Czechoslovakia.

== Table tennis career ==
From 1947 to 1959 he won some medals in team events in the Table Tennis European Championships and in the World Table Tennis Championships.

His 19 World Championship medals included five gold medals; two in the team event and three in the doubles with Bohumil Váňa and Ivan Andreadis respectively.

He also won an English Open title.

== Personal life ==
He worked as an official for the Ninth of May Jawa motorcycle works.

== See also ==
- List of table tennis players
- List of World Table Tennis Championships medalists
