= Toshiaki Tanaka =

Japanese table tennis player

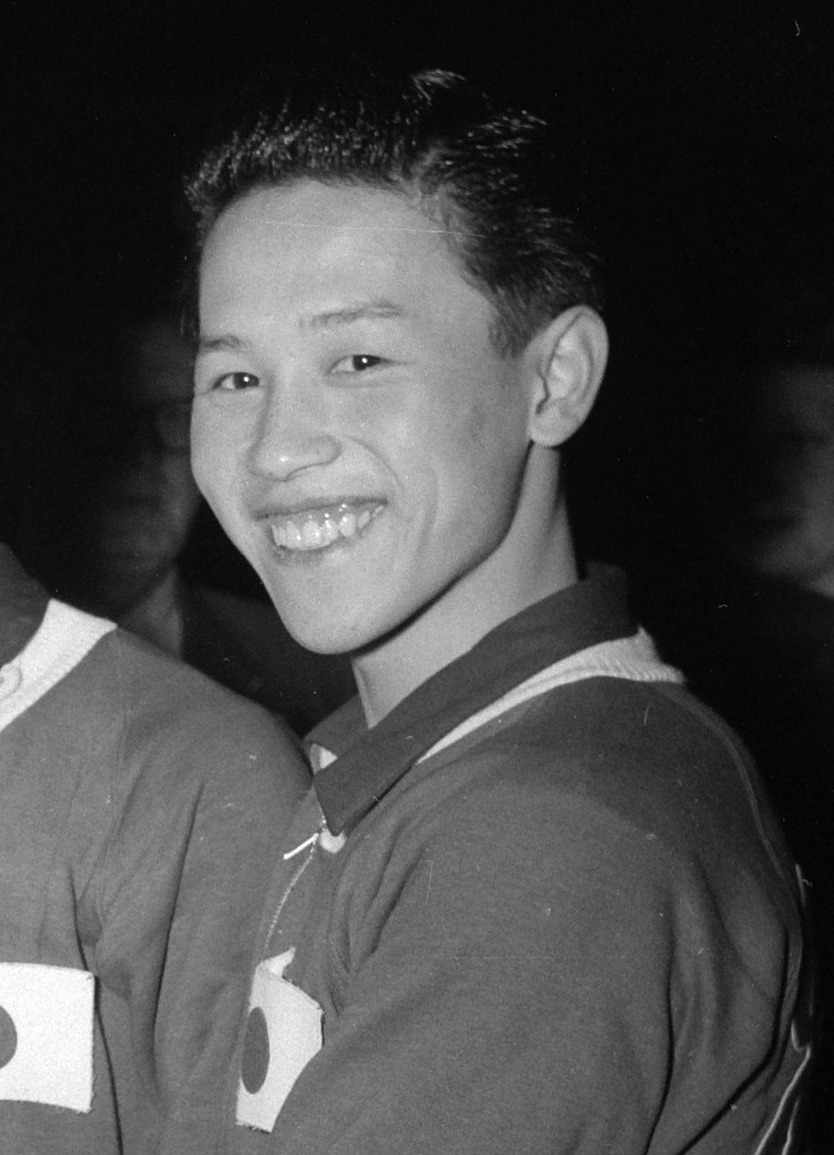
- Toshiaki Tanaka at the 1955 World Championships

Personal information
- Nationality: Japan
- Born: 24 February 1935 Hokkaido, Japan
- Died: 6 February 1998 (aged 62)

Sport
- Sport: Table tennis
Medal record
Table tennis
Representing Japan
World Championships
Gold medal – first place	1957 Stockholm	Singles
Silver medal – second place	1957 Stockholm	Doubles
Gold medal – first place	1957 Stockholm	Team
Silver medal – second place	1956 Tokyo	Singles
Bronze medal – third place	1956 Tokyo	Doubles
Gold medal – first place	1956 Tokyo	Team
Gold medal – first place	1955 Utrecht	Singles
Bronze medal – third place	1955 Utrecht	Mixed doubles
Gold medal – first place	1955 Utrecht	Team

Toshiaki Tanaka (田中 利明, Tanaka Toshiaki; 24 February 1935 – 6 February 1998) was a Japanese international table tennis player.

== Table tennis career ==
From 1955 to 1957 he won several medals in singles, doubles, and team events in the World Table Tennis Championships.

He also won an English Open title.

The nine World Championship medals included five gold medals; two in the singles at the 1955 World Table Tennis Championships and 1957 World Table Tennis Championships and three in the team event for Japan.

== Legacy ==
After the 1955 World Championships Tanaka became popular in the Netherlands, where on 30 May 1969 Rien van Thoor and Marius van Rijckevorsel established the table tennis club TTV Tanaka in Etten-Leur. The club still exists and has never changed its name.

In 1997 Tanaka was inducted into the ITTF Hall of Fame.

== See also ==
- List of table tennis players
- List of World Table Tennis Championships medalists
