= Ella Zeller =

Romanian table tennis player (1933–2025)

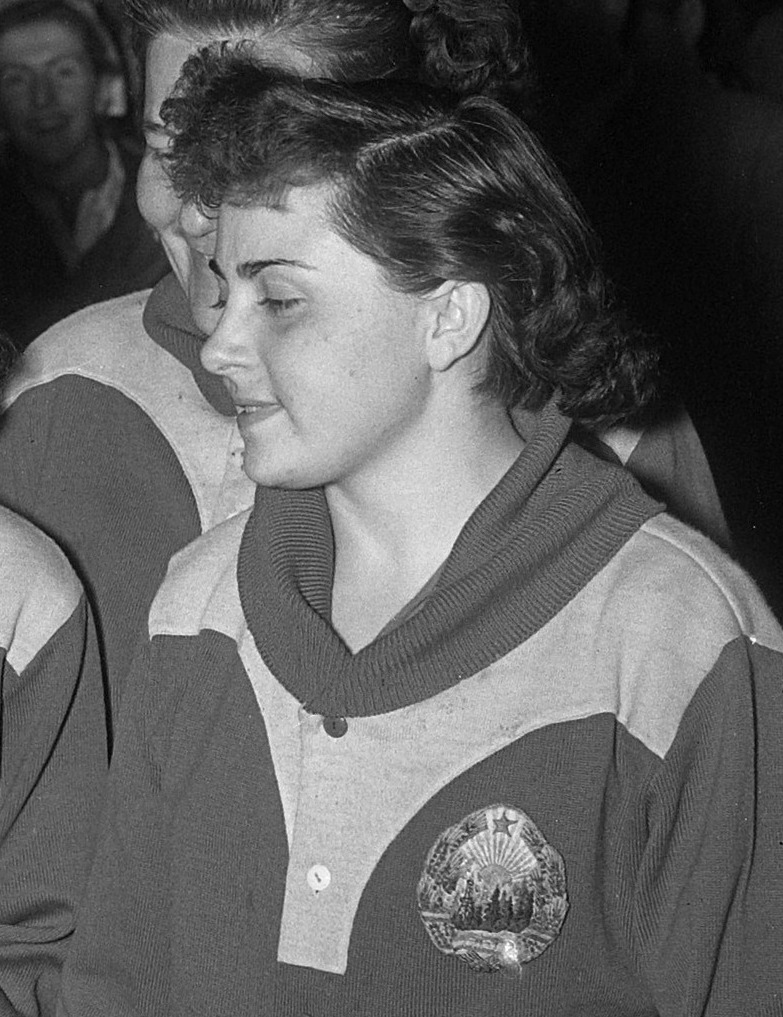
- Zeller at the 1955 World Championships

Personal information
- Full name: Ella Constantinescu-Zeller
- Nationality: Romania
- Born: 26 November 1933 Moldova Nouă, Romania
- Died: 8 March 2025 (aged 91)

Sport
- Sport: Table tennis
Medal record
Table tennis
Representing Romania
World Championships
Bronze medal – third place	1963 Prague	Singles
Silver medal – second place	1963 Prague	Team
Bronze medal – third place	1957 Stockholm	Singles
Bronze medal – third place	1957 Stockholm	Doubles
Silver medal – second place	1957 Stockholm	Team
Bronze medal – third place	1956 Tokyo	Singles
Gold medal – first place	1956 Tokyo	Doubles
Bronze medal – third place	1956 Tokyo	Mixed doubles
Gold medal – first place	1956 Tokyo	Team
Gold medal – first place	1955 Utrecht	Doubles
Gold medal – first place	1955 Utrecht	Team
Gold medal – first place	1953 Bucharest	Team
Silver medal – second place	1952 Bombay	Team
Gold medal – first place	1951 Vienna	Team
European Championships
Gold medal – first place	1958 Budapest	Doubles
Silver medal – second place	1958 Budapest	Team
Silver medal – second place	1964 Malmo	Doubles

Ella Zeller (married name Ella Constantinescu; 26 November 1933 – 8 March 2025) was a Romanian table tennis player, coach and administrator. Between 1952 and 1964, she won several medals in singles, doubles, and team events in the Table Tennis European Championships and in the World Table Tennis Championships. In 1995, she was inducted to the ITTF Hall of Fame.

Zeller began training in table tennis in Timișoara and then moved to Bucharest. She graduated from an institute of physical education, and after retiring from competitions, she worked as a table tennis coach with the national team (1967–1989). She also took leading positions in the national and European tennis table federations and served as President of the National Commission for Women sport. In 1989, Zeller moved to Germany where in 1990–1994, she worked for the German Table Tennis Federation.

In 2000, she was awarded the Cross of Faithful Service (3rd class) by then President of Romania – Emil Constantinescu. She died on 8 March 2025, at the age of 91.

== See also ==
- List of table tennis players
- List of World Table Tennis Championships medalists
