= Ivan Andreadis =

Czech table tennis player

Personal information
- Nationality: Czechoslovakia
- Born: 3 April 1924 Prague, Czechoslovakia
- Died: 27 October 1992 (aged 68) Prague, Czechoslovakia

Sport
- Sport: Table tennis
- Playing style: Shakehand grip
Medal record
Men's table tennis
Representing Czechoslovakia
World Championships
Bronze medal – third place	1957 Stockholm	Singles
Gold medal – first place	1957 Stockholm	Doubles
Silver medal – second place	1957 Stockholm	Mixed Doubles
Bronze medal – third place	1957 Stockholm	Men's Team
Silver medal – second place	1956 Tokyo	Doubles
Silver medal – second place	1956 Tokyo	Mixed Doubles
Silver medal – second place	1956 Tokyo	Men's Team
Gold medal – first place	1955 Utrecht	Doubles
Silver medal – second place	1955 Utrecht	Men's Team
Bronze medal – third place	1954 Wembley	Singles
Gold medal – first place	1954 Wembley	Doubles
Silver medal – second place	1954 Wembley	Men's Team
Silver medal – second place	1953 Bucharest	Singles
Bronze medal – third place	1953 Bucharest	Doubles
Bronze medal – third place	1953 Bucharest	Men's Team
Silver medal – second place	1951 Vienna	Singles
Gold medal – first place	1951 Vienna	Doubles
Gold medal – first place	1951 Vienna	Men's Team
Bronze medal – third place	1950 Budapest	Singles
Silver medal – second place	1950 Budapest	Doubles
Bronze medal – third place	1950 Budapest	Mixed Doubles
Gold medal – first place	1950 Budapest	Men's Team
Gold medal – first place	1949 Stockholm	Doubles
Silver medal – second place	1949 Stockholm	Men's Team
Bronze medal – third place	1948 Wembley	Singles
Gold medal – first place	1948 Wembley	Men's Team
Gold medal – first place	1947 Paris	Men's Team

Ivan Andreadis (3 April 1924 – 27 October 1992) was a Czech table tennis player.

== Table tennis career ==
He won several medals in singles, doubles, and team events in the World Table Tennis Championships from 1947 to 1957.

His 27 World Championship medals included nine gold medals; four in the team event, four in the doubles with František Tokár, Bohumil Váňa and Ladislav Štípek respectively and one in the mixed doubles with Gizi Farkas.

He also won three English Open titles.

He was of Greek-Jewish origin.

== Hall of Fame ==
He was inducted into the Hall of Fame of the International Table Tennis Federation in 1995.

He worked as a railway planning official in the ČKD Sokolovo works in Prague.

== See also ==
- List of table tennis players
- List of World Table Tennis Championships medalists
