= Ichiro Ogimura =

Japanese table tennis player

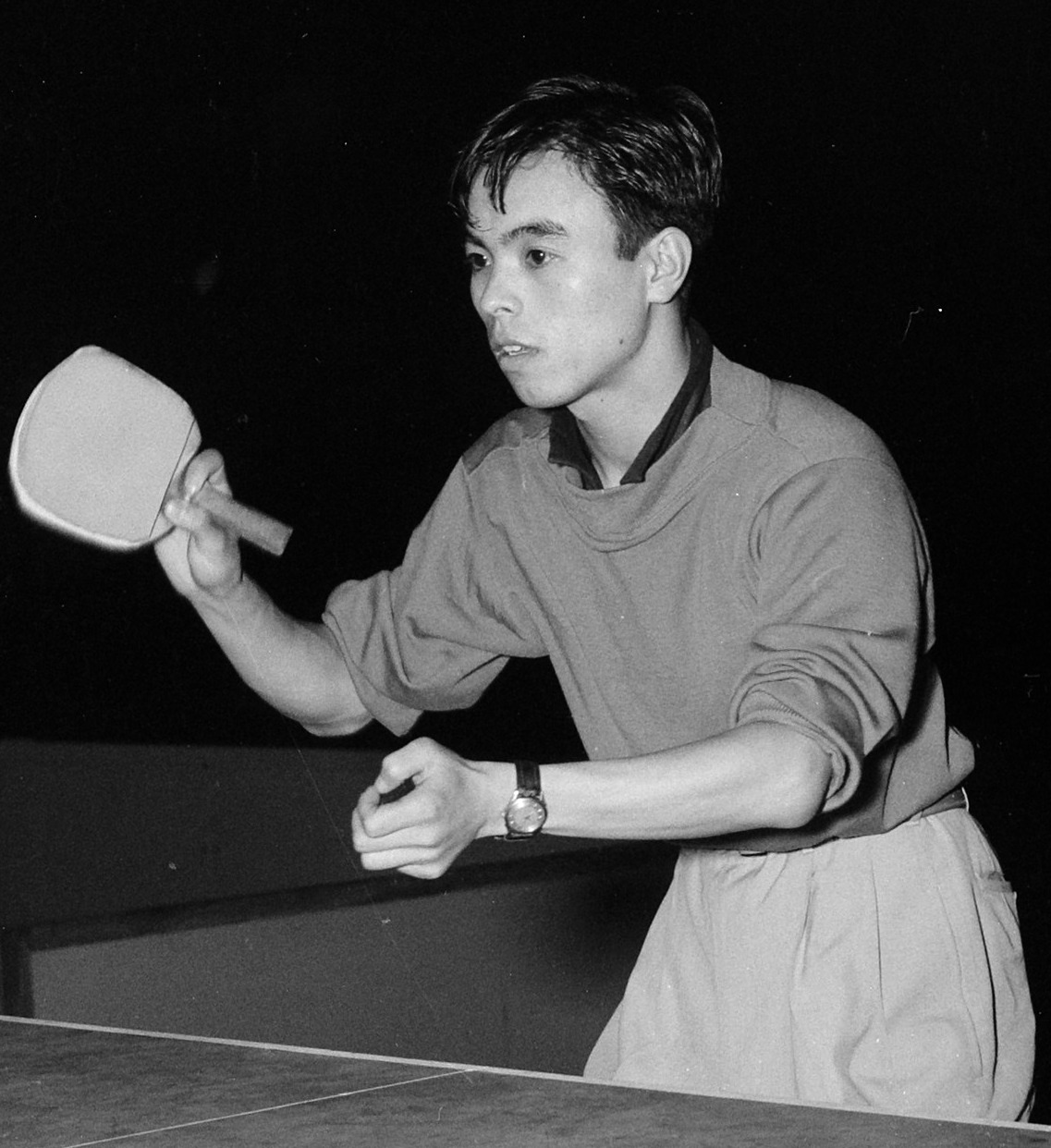
- Ogimura at the 1955 World Championships

Personal information
- Nationality: Japan
- Born: June 25, 1932 Itō, Shizuoka, Japan
- Died: December 4, 1994 (aged 62) Tokyo, Japan

Sport
- Sport: Table tennis
- Playing style: Traditional Japanese Penhold
- Highest ranking: 1 (September 1954)
Medal record
Men's table tennis
Representing Japan
World Championships
Silver medal – second place	1965 Ljubljana	Team
Silver medal – second place	1963 Prague	Team
Gold medal – first place	1961 Beijing	Mixed doubles
Silver medal – second place	1961 Beijing	Team
Bronze medal – third place	1959 Dortmund	Singles
Gold medal – first place	1959 Dortmund	Doubles
Gold medal – first place	1959 Dortmund	Mixed doubles
Gold medal – first place	1959 Dortmund	Team
Silver medal – second place	1957 Stockholm	Singles
Silver medal – second place	1957 Stockholm	Doubles
Gold medal – first place	1957 Stockholm	Mixed doubles
Gold medal – first place	1957 Stockholm	Team
Gold medal – first place	1956 Tokyo	Singles
Gold medal – first place	1956 Tokyo	Doubles
Gold medal – first place	1956 Tokyo	Team
Bronze medal – third place	1955 Utrecht	Doubles
Gold medal – first place	1955 Utrecht	Team
Gold medal – first place	1954 Wembley	Singles
Bronze medal – third place	1954 Wembley	Doubles
Gold medal – first place	1954 Wembley	Team
Asian Games
Silver medal – second place	1962 Jakarta	Singles
Silver medal – second place	1962 Jakarta	Doubles
Gold medal – first place	1962 Jakarta	Mixed doubles
Gold medal – first place	1962 Jakarta	Team
Bronze medal – third place	1958 Tokyo	Singles
Gold medal – first place	1958 Tokyo	Mixed doubles
Silver medal – second place	1958 Tokyo	Team
Asian Championships
Gold medal – first place	1960 Bombay	Singles
Gold medal – first place	1960 Bombay	Doubles
Gold medal – first place	1960 Bombay	Mixed doubles
Gold medal – first place	1960 Bombay	Team
Gold medal – first place	1953 Tokyo	Team

Ichiro Ogimura (荻村 伊智朗, Ogimura Ichirō; June 25, 1932 – December 4, 1994) was a Japanese table tennis player, coach, president of the ITTF and former World No. 1 who won 12 World championship titles during his career. Ogimura was also a key figure in the Ping Pong Diplomacy events of the early 1970s, as well as being instrumental in Korea playing as a unified team at the 1991 World Table Tennis Championships.

== Early life ==
Ogimura was born in Itō, Shizuoka, in 1932. His father died when Ogimura was two years old, and his mother often worked too late to take care of him.

Ogimura began playing table tennis in April 1948 as a student at Metropolitan Tenth Junior High School, where he was a student. At the age of 16, Ogimura started practicing the sport at the Musashino table tennis hall, run by Hisae Uehara, in Kichijoji, Tokyo.

He later enrolled in the Tokyo Metropolitan University and, in 1953 he transferred on a scholarship to Tengaku Nihon University's Faculty of Arts, Department of Films.

== Table tennis career ==
He won the All-Japan National Championships and represented Japan at the World Championships. He won 12 world titles at the Championships including men's singles in 1954 and 1956, together with 5 consecutive titles in the team competitions.

He also won three English Open titles.

== Retirement ==
After his retirement, Ogimura coached overseas in Sweden, China and USA. He got involved in the Japanese Olympic Committee and Japan Table Tennis Association. He became an executive member of the International Table Tennis Federation in 1973 and president in 1987. In 1994, Ogimura died of lung cancer; he was survived by his wife, a son and two daughters. He was inducted into the ITTF Hall of Fame in 1997.

== The "Ping-pong Diplomat" ==
Ichiro Ogimura was a key figure in the "Ping-pong diplomacy" of the early 1970s, and has been called "a giant of sports diplomacy" and garnered the nickname, the "Ping-pong Diplomat.”

While the meeting of Glenn Cowan and Zhuang Zedong is often used as the catalyst for the "Ping Pong Diplomacy" movement, Ogimura had already been working behind the scenes to arrange for China's return to the international table tennis scene. On Ogimura's insistence, Chinese Premier, Zhou Enlai, allowed the Chinese national team to take part in the 1971 World Table Tennis Championships in Nagoya, Japan. It was at this tournament where Cowen and Zedong had their chance meeting, an event which led to the meeting of President Nixon and Chairman Mao.

The "highlight of Ogimura’s table tennis diplomacy" was his work in leading North Korea and South Korea to play as a unified Korean team at the 1991 World Table Tennis Championships in Chiba, Japan. Prior to the championships, Ogimura "visited South Korea 20 times and traveled to North Korea 15 times to plead for a unified team from the Korean peninsula. Ogimura worked with local Japanese government heads to create joint training camps in the cities of Nagano, Nagaoka in Niigata Prefecture, and Chiba, and secured agreement from the ITTF for North Korea and South Korea to compete under the unified name of “Korea" – the first such occurrence since the Korean War.

The unified Korean team played under a white flag depicting the Korean Peninsula in blue, and used the Korean folksong, Arirang, rather than a national anthem of the North or the South. The competition saw the Korean team win one gold medal, one silver and two bronze medals.

Ichiro Ogimura also served as the Japanese goodwill ambassador to the United Kingdom in 1954.

== Playing style ==
The "Fifty-One Percent Doctrine" was a playing style invented and popularised by Ogimura. It encouraged an aggressive playing style whereby a smash shot would be risked by a player if they believed they had a 51% or higher chance of defeating the opponent with it. This style was later adopted by world champions such as Zhuang Zedong and Stellan Bengtsson, to both of whom Ogimura served as a coach and mentor.

== Equipment ==
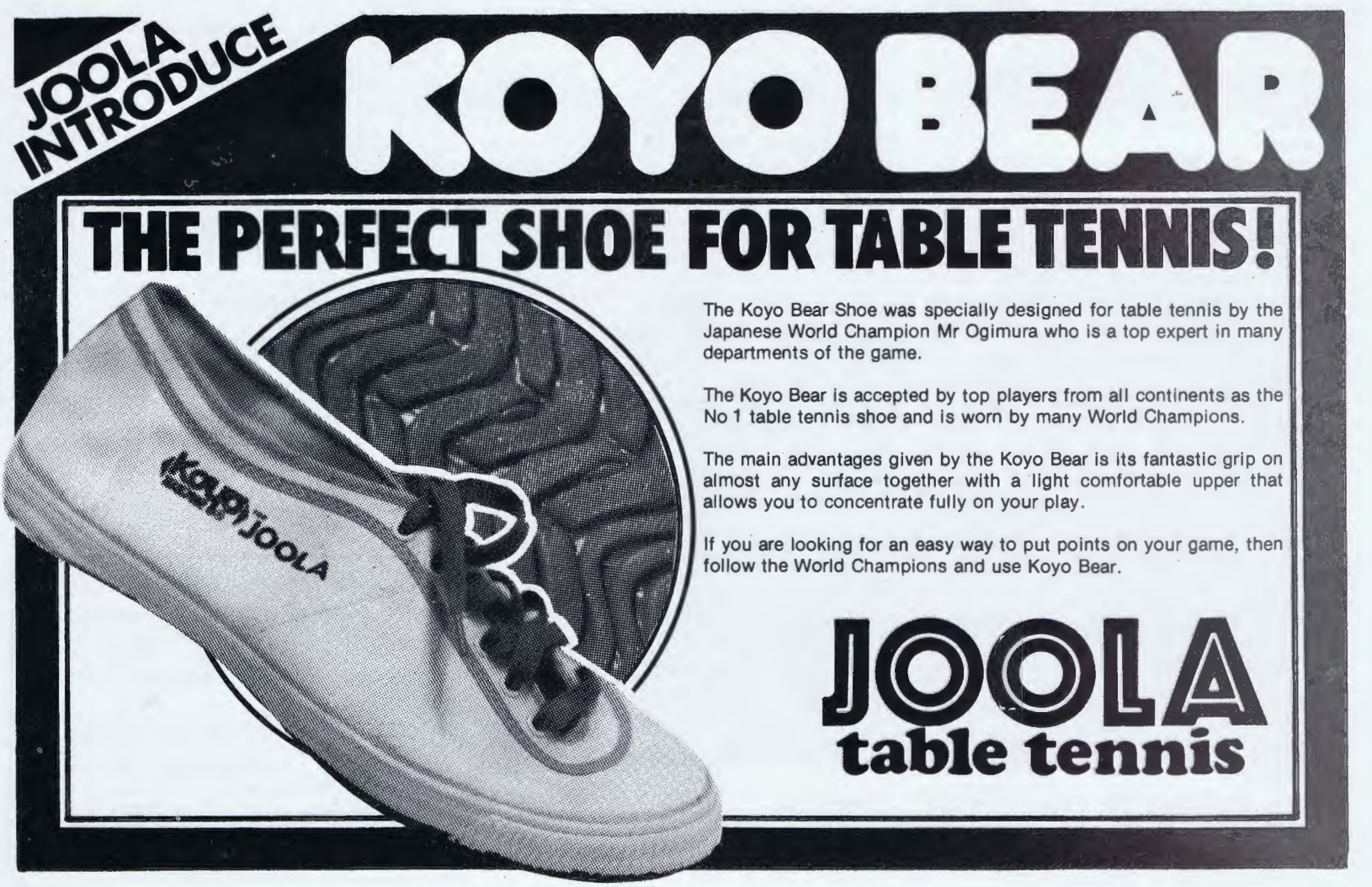
Old advertisement of shoe designed by Ichiro Ogimura for table tennis for Japanese footwear brand, Koyo Bear.

Ogimura was active in the development of table tennis equipment, designing a shoe especially designed for table tennis for Japanese footwear brand, Koyo Bear. In Britain, the shoes were marketed in cooperation with the table tennis equipment brand Joola and co-branded with the Joola logo.

== See also ==
- List of table tennis players
- List of World Table Tennis Championships medalists
