= 1985 World Table Tennis Championships =

1985 edition of the World Table Tennis Championships

The 1985 World Table Tennis Championships were held in Gothenburg from March 28 to April 7, 1985.

== Results ==
=== Team ===
Event	Gold	Silver	Bronze
Swaythling Cup; Men's Team	China; Chen Longcan; Chen Xinhua; Jiang Jialiang; Wang Huiyuan; Xie Saike	Sweden; Mikael Appelgren; Ulf Bengtsson; Ulf Carlsson; Erik Lindh; Jan-Ove Waldner	Poland; Stefan Dryszel; Andrzej Grubba; Andrzej Jakubowicz; Leszek Kucharski; Norbert Mnich
Corbillon Cup; Women's Team	China; Dai Lili; Geng Lijuan; He Zhili; Tong Ling	North Korea; Cho Jung-hui; Han Hye-Song; Li Bun-Hui; Pang Chun-Dok	South Korea; Lee Soo-ja; Lee Sun; Yang Young-Ja; Yoon Kyung-mi

=== Individual ===
Event	Gold	Silver	Bronze
Men's singles	(China) Jiang Jialiang	(China) Chen Longcan	(Hong Kong) Lo Chuen Tsung
Men's singles	(China) Jiang Jialiang	(China) Chen Longcan	(China) Teng Yi
Women's singles	(China) Cao Yanhua	(China) Geng Lijuan	(China) Qi Baoxiang
Women's singles	(China) Cao Yanhua	(China) Geng Lijuan	(China) Dai Lili
Men's doubles	(Sweden) Mikael Appelgren (Sweden) Ulf Carlsson	(Czechoslovakia) Milan Orlowski (Czechoslovakia) Jindřich Panský	(China) Fan Changmao (China) He Zhiwen
Men's doubles	(Sweden) Mikael Appelgren (Sweden) Ulf Carlsson	(Czechoslovakia) Milan Orlowski (Czechoslovakia) Jindřich Panský	(China) Cai Zhenhua (China) Jiang Jialiang
Women's doubles	(China) Dai Lili (China) Geng Lijuan	(China) Cao Yanhua (China) Ni Xialian	(China) Jiao Zhimin (China) Qi Baoxiang
Women's doubles	(China) Dai Lili (China) Geng Lijuan	(China) Cao Yanhua (China) Ni Xialian	(China) Guan Jianhua (China) Tong Ling
Mixed doubles	(China) Cai Zhenhua (China) Cao Yanhua	(Czechoslovakia) Jindřich Panský (Czechoslovakia) Marie Hrachová	(China) Chen Xinhua (China) Tong Ling
Mixed doubles	(China) Cai Zhenhua (China) Cao Yanhua	(Czechoslovakia) Jindřich Panský (Czechoslovakia) Marie Hrachová	(China) Fan Changmao (China) Jiao Zhimin
