= 1983 World Table Tennis Championships – Mixed doubles =

1983 Mixed doubles

The 1983 World Table Tennis Championships mixed doubles was the 37th edition of the mixed doubles championship.

Guo Yuehua and Ni Xialian defeated Chen Xinhua and Tong Ling in the final by three sets to two.

== Results ==
Round of 16
(China) Xie Saike (China) Huang Junqun	21	19	21	21
(Hungary) István Jónyer (Hungary) Gabrielle Szabo	7	21	11	7
(China) Fan Changmao (China) Shen Jianping	21	21	21
(Sweden) Jan-Ove Waldner (Sweden) Pia Eliasson	9	9	11
(China) Chen Xinhua (China) Tong Ling	21	21	21
(France) Jacques Secrétin (Soviet Union) Valentina Popova	13	9	17
(Poland) Andrzej Grubba (Netherlands) Bettine Vriesekoop	21	20	21	22
(China) Chen Jian (China) Dai Lili	10	22	19	20
(China) Cai Zhenhua (China) Cao Yanhua	21	21	21
(Soviet Union) Igor Solopov (Soviet Union) Fliura Bulatova	13	11	15
(China) Wang Huiyuan (China) Qi Baoxiang	21	17	21	21
(Czechoslovakia) Jindřich Panský (Czechoslovakia) Marie Hrachová	19	21	14	14
(China) Diao Ming (China) Pu Qijuan	11	12	21	21	21
(Socialist Federal Republic of Yugoslavia) Dragutin Šurbek (Socialist Federal Republic of Yugoslavia) Branka Batinić	21	21	14	19	15
(China) Guo Yuehua (China) Ni Xialian	21	18	21	23
(Sweden) Erik Lindh (Sweden) Marie Lindblad	15	21	17	21

Quarterfinals
(China) Xie Saike (China) Huang Junqun	21	21	21
(China) Fan Changmao (China) Shen Jianping	17	14	17
(China) Chen Xinhua (China) Tong Ling	22	21	21
(Poland) Grubba (Netherlands) Vriesekoop	20	10	7
(China) Cai Zhenhua (China) Cao Yanhua	21	14	21	22
(China) Wang Huiyuan (China) Qi Baoxiang	17	21	17	20
(China) Diao Ming (China) Pu Qijuan	19	21	21	10	13
(China) Guo Yuehua (China) Ni Xialian	21	16	13	21	21

Semifinals
(China) Xie Saike (China) Huang Junqun	15	15	21	21	19
(China) Chen Xinhua (China) Tong Ling	21	21	18	8	21
(China) Cai Zhenhua (China) Cao Yanhua	15	21	15	18
(China) Guo Yuehua (China) Ni Xialian	21	14	21	21

Final
(China) Chen Xinhua (China) Tong Ling	13	21	19	21	12
(China) Guo Yuehua (China) Ni Xialian	21	17	21	18	21

== See also ==
List of World Table Tennis Championships medalists
