= 1983 World Table Tennis Championships – Men's doubles =

1983 Men's doubles

The 1983 World Table Tennis Championships men's doubles was the 37th edition of the men's doubles championship. Dragutin Šurbek and Zoran Kalinić won the title after defeating Xie Saike and Jiang Jialiang in the final by three sets to two.

== Results ==
Round of 16
(China) Xie Saike (China) Jiang Jialiang	21	21	21
(Poland) Andrzej Grubba (Poland) Leszek Kucharski	16	17	12
(Soviet Union) Mikhail Ovtcharov (Soviet Union) Ivan Minkevich	14	21	9	16
(Hungary) Gábor Gergely (Hungary) István Jónyer	21	18	21	21
(Japan) Kiyoshi Saito (Japan) Masahiro Maehara	21	17	21	21
(France) Jacques Secrétin (France) Patrick Birocheau	17	21	16	9
(China) Wang Huiyuan (China) Yang Yuhua	21	21	17	15	21
(Sweden) Erik Lindh (Sweden) Jan-Ove Waldner	17	18	21	21	19
(Japan) Seiji Ono (Japan) Hiroyuki Abe
(Hungary) János Molnár (Hungary) Zsolt Kriston
(China) Cai Zhenhua (China) Fan Changmao
(Sweden) Mikael Appelgren (Sweden) Ulf "Tickan" Carlsson
(China) Chen Xinhua (China) Diao Ming	21	21	21
(Czechoslovakia) Milan Orlowski (Czechoslovakia) Jindřich Panský	16	19	18
(Sweden) Stellan Bengtsson (Sweden) Ulf Bengtsson	11	11	11
(Socialist Federal Republic of Yugoslavia) Dragutin Šurbek (Socialist Federal Republic of Yugoslavia) Zoran Kalinić	21	21	21

Quarterfinals
(China) Xie Saike (China) Jiang Jialiang	23	18	21	21
(Hungary) Gergely (Hungary) Jónyer	21	21	11	19
(Japan) Saito (Japan) Maehara	21	21	23	16	16
(China) Wang Huiyuan (China) Yang Yuhua	12	14	25	21	21
(Japan) Ono (Japan) Abe	12	21	21	21
(China) Cai Zhenhua (China) Fan Changmao	21	18	17	15
(China) Chen Xinhua (China) Diao Ming	8	17	19
(Socialist Federal Republic of Yugoslavia) Šurbek (Socialist Federal Republic of Yugoslavia) Kalinić	21	21	21

Semifinals
(China) Xie Saike (China) Jiang Jialiang	21	21	21
(China) Wang Huiyan (China) Yang Yuhua	13	10	16
(Japan) Ono (Japan) Abe	16	9	9
(Socialist Federal Republic of Yugoslavia) Šurbek (Socialist Federal Republic of Yugoslavia) Kalinić	21	21	21

Final
(China) Xie Saike (China) Jiang Jialiang	15	21	22	17	20
(Socialist Federal Republic of Yugoslavia) Šurbek (Socialist Federal Republic of Yugoslavia) Kalinić	21	19	20	21	22

== See also ==
List of World Table Tennis Championships medalists
