= 1983 World Table Tennis Championships – Women's doubles =

1983 Women's doubles

The 1983 World Table Tennis Championships women's doubles was the 36th edition of the women's doubles championship. Shen Jianping and Dai Lili defeated Geng Lijuan and Huang Junqun in the final by three sets to two.

== Results ==
Round of 16
(China) Cao Yanhua (China) Ni Xialian	21	21	21
(Czechoslovakia) Marie Hrachová (Netherlands) Bettine Vriesekoop	16	15	4
(Soviet Union) Anita Zakharian (Socialist Federal Republic of Yugoslavia) Gordana Perkučin	21	12	21	19	19
(Japan) Emiko Kanda (Japan) Mika Hoshino	19	21	13	21	21
(China) Shen Jianping (China) Dai Lili	21	21	21
(Soviet Union) Valentina Popova (Soviet Union) Jolanta Daniliavichute	18	11	12
(South Korea) Yang Young-ja (South Korea) Yoon Kyung-mi	21	21	21
(France) Brigitte Thiriet (France) Patricia Germain	11	18	18
(China) Tong Ling (China) Pu Qijuan	22	14	21	21
(Hungary) Edit Urbán (Hungary) Gabriella Szabó	20	21	17	12
(Japan) Fumiko Shinpo (Japan) Tomoko Tamura	21	21	18	21
(Soviet Union) Flura Bulatova (Soviet Union) Inna Kovalenko	19	15	21	16
(South Korea) Li Mi-woo (South Korea) Shin Deuk-hwa	21	21	13	21
(Finland) Sonja Grefberg (West Germany) Andrea Gutknecht	13	11	12
(China) Geng Lijuan (China) Huang Junqun	21	21	21
(Belgium) Barbara Lippens (Netherlands) Ellen Bakker	17	15	12

Quarterfinals
(China) Cao Yanhua (China) Ni Xialian	21	18	21	21
(Japan) Kanda (Japan) Hoshino	11	21	14	9
(China) Shen Jiaping (China) Dai Lili	21	21	13	21
(South Korea) Yang Young-ja (South Korea) Yoon Kyung-mi	12	16	21	12
(China) Tong Ling (China) Pu Qijuan	11	21	21	16	26
(Japan) Shinpo (Japan) Tamura	21	19	11	21	24
(South Korea) Li Mi-woo (South Korea) Shin Deuk-hwa	13	20	21	8
(China) Geng Lijuan (China) Huang Junqun	21	22	10	21

Semifinals
(China) Cao Yanhua (China) Ni Xialian	21	14	17	21	17
(China) Shen Jiaping (China) Dai Lili	18	21	21	11	21
(China) Tong Ling (China) Pu Qijuan	21	14	20	18
(China) Geng Lijuan (China) Huang Junqun	9	21	22	21

Final
(China) Shen Jiaping (China) Dai Lili	23	21	15	10	21
(China) Geng Lijuan (China) Huang Junqun	21	12	21	21	16

== See also ==
List of World Table Tennis Championships medalists
