= 1983 World Table Tennis Championships =

1983 edition of the World Table Tennis Championships

The 1983 World Table Tennis Championships were held in Tokyo between 28 April–9 May 1983.

== Results ==
=== Team ===
Event	Gold	Silver	Bronze
Swaythling Cup; Men's Team	China; Cai Zhenhua; Fan Changmao; Guo Yuehua; Jiang Jialiang; Xie Saike	Sweden; Mikael Appelgren; Stellan Bengtsson; Ulf Bengtsson; Erik Lindh; Jan-Ove Waldner	Hungary; Gábor Gergely; István Jónyer; Zoltán Káposztás; Zsolt Kriston; János Molnár
Corbillon Cup; Women's team	China; Cao Yanhua; Geng Lijuan; Ni Xialian; Tong Ling	Japan; Mika Hoshino; Emiko Kanda; Fumiko Shinpo; Tomoko Tamura	North Korea; Chang Yong-ok; Kim Gyong-sun; Li Bun-Hui; Li Song Suk

=== Individual ===
Event	Gold	Silver	Bronze
Men's singles	(China) Guo Yuehua	(China) Cai Zhenhua	(China) Jiang Jialiang
Men's singles	(China) Guo Yuehua	(China) Cai Zhenhua	(China) Wang Huiyuan
Women's singles	(China) Cao Yanhua	(South Korea) Yang Young-ja	(China) Qi Baoxiang
Women's singles	(China) Cao Yanhua	(South Korea) Yang Young-ja	(China) Huang Junqun
Men's doubles	(Socialist Federal Republic of Yugoslavia) Zoran Kalinić (Socialist Federal Republic of Yugoslavia) Dragutin Šurbek	(China) Jiang Jialiang (China) Xie Saike	(Japan) Hiroyuki Abe (Japan) Seiji Ono
Men's doubles	(Socialist Federal Republic of Yugoslavia) Zoran Kalinić (Socialist Federal Republic of Yugoslavia) Dragutin Šurbek	(China) Jiang Jialiang (China) Xie Saike	(China) Wang Huiyuan (China) Yang Yuhua
Women's doubles	(China) Dai Lili (China) Shen Jianping	(China) Geng Lijuan (China) Huang Junqun	(China) Cao Yanhua (China) Ni Xialian
Women's doubles	(China) Dai Lili (China) Shen Jianping	(China) Geng Lijuan (China) Huang Junqun	(China) Pu Qijuan (China) Tong Ling
Mixed doubles	(China) Guo Yuehua (China) Ni Xialian	(China) Chen Xinhua (China) Tong Ling	(China) Cai Zhenhua (China) Cao Yanhua
Mixed doubles	(China) Guo Yuehua (China) Ni Xialian	(China) Chen Xinhua (China) Tong Ling	(China) Xie Saike (China) Huang Junqun
