= 1985 World Table Tennis Championships – Mixed doubles =

1985 Mixed doubles

The 1985 World Table Tennis Championships mixed doubles was the 38th edition of the mixed doubles championship.

Cai Zhenhua and Cao Yanhua defeated Jindřich Panský and Marie Hrachová in the final by two sets to one.

== Results ==
Round of 16
(Czechoslovakia) Jindřich Panský (Czechoslovakia) Marie Hrachová	21	15	21
(Hungary) Zsolt Kriston (Hungary) Csilla Bátorfi	8	21	15
(China) Wang Huiyuan (China) Qi Baoxiang	21	21
(Czechoslovakia) Ilija Lupulesku (Czechoslovakia) Gordana Perkučin	12	17
(China) Wu Wen-chia (China) Chang Shiu-y	21	21
(Belgium) Remo De Prohetis (Belgium) Karine Bogaerts	11	10
(China) Chen Xinhua (China) Tong Ling	21	21
(England) Carl Prean (England) Lisa Bellinger	15	7
(China) Chen Longcan (China) He Zhili	21	21
(China) Xie Saike (China) Geng Lijuan	16	12
(China) Fan Changmao (China) Jiao Zhimin	11	21	21
(Japan) Yoshihito Miyazaki (Japan) Mika Hoshino	21	12	16
(China) Teng Yi (China) Ni Xialian	21	21
(Socialist Federal Republic of Yugoslavia) Dragutin Šurbek (Socialist Federal Republic of Yugoslavia) Branka Batinić	15	15
(China) Cai Zhenhua (China) Cao Yanhua	21	21
(Socialist Federal Republic of Yugoslavia) Vladislav Broda (Czechoslovakia) Alice Pelikánová	13	19

Quarterfinals
(Czechoslovakia) Panský (Czechoslovakia) Hrachová	12	21	21
(China) Wang Huiyuan (China) Qi Baoxiang	21	17	10
(China) Wu Wen-chia (China) Chang Shiu-y	7	13
(China) Chen Xinhua (China) Tong Ling	21	21
(China) Chen Longcan (China) He Zhili	15	18
(China) Fan Changmao (China) Jiao Zhimin	21	21
(China) Teng Yi (China) Ni Xialian	23	19
(China) Cai Zhenhua (China) Cao Yanhua	25	21

Semifinals
(Czechoslovakia) Panský (Czechoslovakia) Hrachová	18	21	24
(China) Chen Xinhua (China) Tong Ling	21	19	22
(China) Fan Changmao (China) Jiao Zhimin	15	19
(China) Cai Zhenhua (China) Cao Yanhua	21	21

Final
(Czechoslovakia) Panský (Czechoslovakia) Hrachová	21	12	8
(China) Cai Zhenhua (China) Cao Yanhua	9	21	21

== See also ==
List of World Table Tennis Championships medalists
