= 1981 World Table Tennis Championships – Mixed doubles =

1981 World Table Tennis Championships - Mixed Doubles

1981 Mixed doubles

The 1981 World Table Tennis Championships mixed doubles was the 36th edition of the mixed doubles championship.

Xie Saike and Huang Junqun defeated Chen Xinhua and Tong Ling in the final by three sets to nil.

== Results ==
Round of 16
(China) Xie Saike (China) Huang Junqun	21	21	21
(China) Wang Huiyuan (China) Geng Lijuan	15	13	15
(France) Jacques Secrétin (France) Claude Bergeret	24	21	12	21
(Japan) Hideo Goto (Japan) Rie Wada	22	16	21	17
(China) Huang Liang (China) Pu Qijuan	21	16	21	20	21
(Japan) Seiji Ono (Japan) Emiko Kanda	16	21	13	22	13
(China) Guo Yuehua (China) Zhang Deying	21	15	21	21
(Soviet Union) Igor Solopov (Soviet Union) Fliura Bulatova	18	21	18	17
(China) Li Zhenshi (China) Yan Guili	21	21	21
(Sweden) Tommy Danielsson (Sweden) Anneli Hernvall	19	7	14
(Socialist Federal Republic of Yugoslavia) Dragutin Šurbek (Socialist Federal Republic of Yugoslavia) Branka Batinić	17	21	21	21
(Japan) Hitoshi Kaihoko (Japan) Hiroko Umeda	21	13	14	11
(China) Cai Zhenhua (China) Cao Yanhua	21	21	21
(Czechoslovakia) Jindřich Panský (Czechoslovakia) Marie Hrachová	17	16	14
(China) Chen Xinhua (China) Tong Ling	21	21	21
(Japan) Norio Takashima (Japan) Kayoko Kawakhigshi	9	12	14

Quarterfinals
(China) Xie Saike (China) Huang Junqun	21	21	21
(France) Secrétin (France) Bergeret	5	14	11
(China) Huang Liang (China) Pu Qijuan	21	21	21
(China) Guo Yuehua (China) Zhang Deying	15	8	14
(China) Li Zhenshi (China) Yan Guili	21	12	17	21	18
(Socialist Federal Republic of Yugoslavia) Šurbek (Socialist Federal Republic of Yugoslavia) Batinić	14	21	21	14	21
(China) Cai Zhenhua (China) Cao Yanhua	14	12	10
(China) Chen Xinhua (China) Tong Ling	21	21	21

Semifinals
(China) Xie Saike (China) Huang Junqun	21	21	21
(China) Huang Liang (China) Pu Qijuan	15	11	8
(Socialist Federal Republic of Yugoslavia) Šurbek (Socialist Federal Republic of Yugoslavia) Batinić	9	21	14	18
(China) Chen Xinhua (China) Tong Ling	21	11	21	21

Final
(China) Xie Saike (China) Huang Junqun	21	21	21
(China) Chen Xinhua (China) Tong Ling	12	11	15

== See also ==
List of World Table Tennis Championships medalists
