= 1981 World Table Tennis Championships – Women's doubles =

1981 Women's doubles

The 1981 World Table Tennis Championships women's doubles was the 35th edition of the women's doubles championship. Zhang Deying and Cao Yanhua defeated Tong Ling and Pu Qijuan in the final by three sets to nil.

== Results ==
Round of 16
(Soviet Union) Valentina Popova (Soviet Union) Narine Antonjan	21	21	21
(China) Liu Yang (China) Shen Jianping	7	19	13
(England) Jill Hammersley (England) Linda Jarvis	15	22	14	22	15
(China) Huang Junqun (China) Yan Guili	21	20	21	20	21
(China) Tong Ling (China) Pu Qijuan	15	21	21	21
(Hungary) Judit Magos (Hungary) Edit Urban	21	12	12	14
(South Korea) Lee Soo-ja (South Korea) Kim Kung Ja	21	21	21
(Romania) Eva Ferenczi (Romania) Olga Nemeș	15	8	16
(China) Zhang Deying (China) Cao Yanhua	21	21	25
(Soviet Union) Jolanta Daniliavichute (Soviet Union) Anita Zakharian	17	15	23
(Japan) Kayoko Kawahigashi (Japan) Rie Wada	21	21	21
(West Germany) Ursula Hirschmuller-Kamizuru (West Germany) Kirsten Kruger	16	13	18
(North Korea) Li Song-suk (North Korea) Kim Gyong-sun	21	21	13	21
(Sweden) Ann-Christin Hellman (Sweden) Marie Lindblad	13	14	21	13
(South Korea) Hwang Nam Sook (South Korea) An Hae Sook	21	20	21	20	21
(Belgium) Barbara Lippens (Belgium) Nathalie Higuet	15	22	14	22	15

Quarterfinals
(China) Liu Yang (China) Shen Jiaping	17	20	12
(China) Huang Yunqun (China) Yan Guili	21	22	21
(China) Tong Ling (China) Pu Qijuan	21	21	21
(South Korea) Lee Soo-ja (South Korea) Kim Kung Ja	18	15	10
(China) Zhang Deying (China) Cao Yanhua	21	21	21
(Japan) Kawahigashi (Japan) Wada	12	16	18
(North Korea) Li Song-suk (North Korea) Kim Gyong Sun	21	27	21	16	11
(South Korea) Hwang Nam Sook (South Korea) An Hae Sook	19	29	14	21	21

Semifinals
(China) Huang Yunqun (China) Yan Guili	10	15	16
(China) Tong Ling (China) Pu Qijuan	21	21	21
(China) Zhang Deying (China) Cao Yanhua	18	21	21	21
(South Korea) Hwang Nam Sook (South Korea) An Hae Sook	21	19	17	16

Final
(China) Tong Ling (China) Pu Qijuan	15	12	18
(China) Zhang Deying (China) Cao Yanhua	21	21	21

== See also ==
List of World Table Tennis Championships medalists
