= 1985 World Table Tennis Championships – Women's doubles =

Sports competition

1985 Women's doubles

The 1985 World Table Tennis Championships women's doubles was the 37th edition of the women's doubles championship. Geng Lijuan and Dai Lili defeated Cao Yanhua and Ni Xialian in the final by two sets to nil.

The championships matches were best of three sets.

== Results ==
Round of 16
(China) Dai Lili (China) Geng Lijuan | 21 | 21
(Czechoslovakia) Marie Hrachová (Netherlands) Bettine Vriesekoop | 17 | 15
(Soviet Union) Narine Antonjan (Soviet Union) Valentina Popova | 21 | 21
(Turkey) Selda Dogan (Turkey) Fylya Turgut | 5 | 11
(North Korea) Han Hye-Song (North Korea) Pang Chun-Dok | 21 | 21
(Sweden) Annika Laeth (Sweden) Marie Svensson | 14 | 15
(China) Jiao Zhimin (China) Qi Baoxiang | 21 | 21
(Chinese Taipei) Chuang Shu-Hwa (Chinese Taipei) Huang Mei-Jen | 13 | 17
(China) Tong Ling (China) Guan Jianhua | 21 | 21
(Belgium) Karine Bogaerts (Belgium) Nathalie Higuet | 6 | 12
(Hungary) Györgyi Fazekas (Hungary) Krisztina Nagy | 19 | 21 | 21
(Sweden) Camilla Bjoerk (Czechoslovakia) Alice Pelikánová | 21 | 15 | 15
(North Korea) Cho Jung-hui (North Korea) Li Bun Hui | 21 | 21
(Canada) Mariann Domonkos (Canada) Gloria Hsu | 16 | 16
(China) Cao Yanhua (China) Ni Xialian | 21 | 21 | 21
(France) Nadine Daviaud (France) Brigitte Thiriet | 17 | 15 | 12

Quarterfinals
(China) Dai Lili (China) Geng Lijuan | 21 | 21
(Soviet Union) AntonJan (Soviet Union) Popova | 8 | 17
(North Korea) Han Hye Song (North Korea) Pang Chun Dok | 19 | 11
(China) Jiao Zhimin (China) Qi Baoxiang | 21 | 21
(China) Tong Ling (China) Guan Jianhua | 21 | 21
(Hungary) Fazekas (Hungary) Nagy | 14 | 15
(North Korea) Cho Jong Hui (North Korea) Li Bun Hui | 14 | 15
(China) Cao Yanhua (China) Ni Xialian | 21 | 21

Semifinals
(China) Dai Lili (China) Geng Lijuan | 12 | 21 | 21
(China) Jiao Zhimin (China) Qi Baoxiang | 21 | 10 | 8
(China) Tong Ling (China) Guan Jianhua | 14 | 16
(China) Cao Yanhua (China) Ni Xialian | 21 | 21

Final
(China) Dai Lili (China) Geng Lijuan | 21 | 21
(China) Cao Yanhua (China) Ni Xialian | 8 | 17

== See also ==
List of World Table Tennis Championships medalists
