= 1983 World Table Tennis Championships – Women's singles =

1983 Women's singles

The 1983 World Table Tennis Championships women's singles was the 37th edition of the women's singles championship. Cao Yanhua defeated Yang Young-ja in the final by three sets to one, to win the title.

== Results ==
Round of 16
(China) Tong Ling	23	21	21
(North Korea) Kim Gyong-sun	21	16	13
(South Korea) Yang Young-ja	14	21	21	21
(China) Geng Lijuan	21	19	17	16
(China) Huang Junqun	21	21	21
(Czechoslovakia) Marie Hrachová	16	18	14
(China) Tian Jing	16	15	23	17
(Japan) Fumiko Shinpo	21	21	21	21
(China) Qi Baoxiang	17	21	21	21
(Japan) Rie Wada	21	10	15	4
(China) Dai Lili	21	21	21
(Hong Kong) Hui Sohung	14	19	18
(China) Ni Xialian	21	21	21
(Netherlands) Bettine Vriesekoop	15	3	12
(China) Cao Yanhua	22	21	21
(Romania) Olga Nemeș	20	17	16

Quarterfinals
(China) Tong Ling	10	16	9
(South Korea) Yang Young-ja	21	21	21
(China) Huang Junqun	16	17	21	21	21
(Japan) Shinpo	21	21	18	15	10
(China) Qi Baoxiang	21	21	21
(China) Dai Lili	17	12	7
(China) Ni Xialian	17	16	21	15
(China) Cao Yanhua	21	21	15	21

Semifinals
(South Korea) Yang Young-ja	19	21	21	21	23
(China) Huang Junqun	21	23	16	19	21
(China) Qi Baoxiang	18	15	19
(China) Cao Yanhua	21	21	21

Final
(South Korea) Yang Young-ja	9	21	9	13
(China) Cao Yanhua	21	10	21	21

== See also ==
List of World Table Tennis Championships medalists
