= 1983 World Table Tennis Championships – Women's team =

1983 Corbillon Cup (women's team)

The 1983 World Table Tennis Championships – Corbillon Cup (women's team) was the 30th edition of the women's team championship.

China won the gold medal defeating Japan 3–0 in the final, North Korea won the bronze medal.

== Medalists ==
Event	Gold	Silver	Bronze
	China; Cao Yanhua; Geng Lijuan; Ni Xialian; Tong Ling	Japan; Mika Hoshino; Emiko Kanda; Fumiko Shinpo; Tomoko Tamura	North Korea; Chang Yong-ok; Kim Gyong-sun; Li Bun-Hui; Li Song Suk

== Final tables ==
=== Group A ===
Pos	Team	P	W	L	Pts
1	China	7	7	0	7
2	North Korea	7	6	1	6
3	Czechoslovakia	7	5	2	5
4	Netherlands	7	4	3	4
5	West Germany	7	2	5	2
6	Hungary	7	2	5	2
7	(Socialist Federal Republic of Yugoslavia) Yugoslavia	7	1	6	1
8	France	7	1	6	1

=== Group B ===
Pos	Team	P	W	L	Pts
1	Japan	7	6	1	6
2	Soviet Union	7	6	1	6
3	South Korea	7	6	1	6
4	England	7	4	3	4
5	Romania	7	3	4	3
6	Sweden	7	2	5	2
7	Finland	7	1	6	1
8	Austria	7	0	7	0

== Semifinals ==
Team One	Team Two	Score
Japan	North Korea	3–1
China	Soviet Union	3–0

== Third-place playoff ==
Team One	Team Two	Score
North Korea	Soviet Union	3–1

== Final ==
China 3		Japan 0	Score
Cao Yanhua	bt	Hoshino	21–13 21–17
Geng Lijuan	bt	Kanda	21–8 21–12
Cao Yanhua & Ni Xialian	bt	Shinpo & Tamura	21–16 21–8

== See also ==
List of World Table Tennis Championships medalists
