= 1982 Asian Table Tennis Championships =

- Date: 24 May – 3 June 1982
- Edition: 6th
- Location: Jakarta, Indonesia

Champions

Men's singles
- (China) Cai Zhenhua

Women's singles
- (China) Cao Yanhua

Men's doubles
- (China) Guo Yuehua / (China) Xie Saike

Women's doubles
- (China) Cao Yanhua / (China) Huang Junqun

Mixed doubles
- (China) Jiang Jialiang / (China) Tong Ling

Men's team
- China

Women's team
- China
← 1980 ·	Asian Table Tennis Championships	· 1984 →

The 6th Asian Table Tennis Championships 1982 were held in Jakarta, Indonesia, from 24 May to 3 June 1982. It was organised by the Indonesian Table Tennis Association under the authority of Asian Table Tennis Union (ATTU) and International Table Tennis Federation (ITTF).

== Medal summary ==
=== Medal table ===
Rank	Nation	Gold	Silver	Bronze	Total
1	China	7	5	4	16
2	Japan	0	2	3	5
3	North Korea	0	0	4	4
4	Hong Kong	0	0	1	1
Totals (4 entries)		7	7	12	26

=== Events ===
Event	Gold	Silver	Bronze
Men's singles	(China) Cai Zhenhua	(China) Xie Saike	(China) Guo Yuehua
Men's singles	(China) Cai Zhenhua	(China) Xie Saike	(Japan) Kiyoshi Saito
Women's singles	(China) Cao Yanhua	(China) Tong Ling	(China) Huang Junqun
Women's singles	(China) Cao Yanhua	(China) Tong Ling	(North Korea) Kim Gyong-sun
Men's doubles	(China) Guo Yuehua (China) Xie Saike	(China) Cai Zhenhua (China) Jiang Jialiang	(Hong Kong) Chiu Man Kuen (Hong Kong) Vong Iu Veng
Men's doubles	(China) Guo Yuehua (China) Xie Saike	(China) Cai Zhenhua (China) Jiang Jialiang	(Japan) Hiroyuki Abe (Japan) Masahiro Maehara
Women's doubles	(China) Cao Yanhua (China) Huang Junqun	(China) Li Chunli (China) Tong Ling	(Japan) Yoshiko Shimauchi (Japan) Keiko Yamashita
Women's doubles	(China) Cao Yanhua (China) Huang Junqun	(China) Li Chunli (China) Tong Ling	(North Korea) Kim Gyong-sun (North Korea) Pang Chun-dok
Mixed doubles	(China) Jiang Jialiang (China) Tong Ling	(China) Guo Yuehua (China) Li Chunli	(China) Cai Zhenhua (China) Cao Yanhua
Mixed doubles	(China) Jiang Jialiang (China) Tong Ling	(China) Guo Yuehua (China) Li Chunli	(China) Xie Saike (China) Huang Junqun
Men's team	China	Japan	North Korea
Women's team	China	Japan	North Korea

== See also ==
- World Table Tennis Championships
- Asian Cup
