= 1981 World Table Tennis Championships – Women's team =

1981 Corbillon Cup (women's team)

The 1981 World Table Tennis Championships – Corbillon Cup (women's team) was the 29th edition of the women's team championship.

China won the gold medal defeating South Korea 3–0 in the final, North Korea won the bronze medal.

== Medalists ==
Event	Gold	Silver	Bronze
	China; Cao Yanhua; Qi Baoxiang; Tong Ling; Zhang Deying	South Korea; An Hae-sook; Hwang Nam-sook; Kim Kyung-ja; Lee Soo-ja	North Korea; Kim Gyong-sun; Li Song Suk; Pak Yung-Sun

== Final tables ==
=== Group A ===
Pos	Team	P	W	L	Pts
1	China	7	7	0	7
2	South Korea	7	5	2	5
3	Hungary	7	5	2	5
4	West Germany	7	4	3	4
5	Czechoslovakia	7	3	4	3
6	Japan	7	3	4	3
7	Finland	7	1	6	1
8	Hong Kong	7	0	7	0

=== Group B ===
Pos	Team	P	W	L	Pts
1	North Korea	7	7	0	7
2	Soviet Union	7	6	1	6
3	Sweden	7	4	3	4
4	Romania	7	3	4	3
5	(Socialist Federal Republic of Yugoslavia) Yugoslavia	7	3	4	3
6	England	7	3	4	3
7	France	7	2	5	2
8	India	7	0	7	0

== Semifinals ==
Team One	Team Two	Score
South Korea	North Korea	3–1
China	Soviet Union	3–0

== Third Place Play Off ==
Team One	Team Two	Score
North Korea	Soviet Union	3–0

== Final ==
China 3		South Korea 0	Score
Qi Baoxiang	bt	Lee Soo-ja	21–16 21–18
Cao Yanhua	bt	Hwang Nam-sook	21–13 21–15
Cao Yanhua & Zhang Deying	bt	Hwang Nam-sook & Lee Soo-ja	21–13 21–18

== See also ==
List of World Table Tennis Championships medalists
