= 1985 World Table Tennis Championships – Men's team =

1985 Swaythling Cup (men's team)

The 1985 World Table Tennis Championships – Swaythling Cup (men's team) was the 38th edition of the men's team championship.

China won the gold medal defeating Sweden 5–0 in the final. Poland won the bronze medal.

== Medalists ==
Event	Gold	Silver	Bronze
	China; Chen Longcan; Chen Xinhua; Jiang Jialiang; Wang Huiyuan; Xie Saike	Sweden; Mikael Appelgren; Ulf Bengtsson; Ulf Carlsson; Erik Lindh; Jan-Ove Waldner	Poland; Stefan Dryszel; Andrzej Grubba; Andrzej Jakubowicz; Leszek Kucharski; Norbert Mnich

== Swaythling Cup tables ==
=== Group A ===
Pos	Team	P	W	L	Pts
1	China	7	7	0	7
2	Poland	7	5	2	5
3	Czechoslovakia	7	4	3	4
4	North Korea	7	4	3	4
5	South Korea	7	3	4	3
6	Hong Kong	7	2	5	2
7	Hungary	7	2	5	2
8	United States	7	1	6	1

=== Group B ===
Pos	Team	P	W	L	Pts
1	Sweden	7	7	0	7
2	Japan	7	6	1	6
3	France	7	5	2	5
4	(Socialist Federal Republic of Yugoslavia) Yugoslavia	7	4	3	4
5	England	7	3	4	3
6	India	7	2	5	2
7	Italy	7	1	6	1
8	Denmark	7	0	7	0

== Semifinals ==
Team One	Team Two	Score
Sweden	Poland	5–3
China	Japan	5–0

== Third-place playoff ==
Team One	Team Two	Score
Poland	Japan	5–3

== Final ==
China 5		Sweden 0	Score
Chen Xinhua	bt	Lindh	21–16 21–16
Jiang Jialiang	bt	Appelgren	21–18 20–22 21–15
Chen Longcan	bt	Waldner	21–11 11–21 21–19
Jiang Jialiang	bt	Lindh	21–18 21–19
Chen Xinhua	bt	Waldner	21–17 14–21 21–14

== See also ==
- List of World Table Tennis Championships medalists
