= 1983 World Table Tennis Championships – Men's team =

1983 Swaythling Cup (men's team)

The 1983 World Table Tennis Championships – Swaythling Cup (men's team) was the 37th edition of the men's team championship.

China won the gold medal defeating Sweden 5–1 in the final. Hungary won the bronze medal.

== Medalists ==
Event	Gold	Silver	Bronze
	China; Cai Zhenhua; Fan Changmao; Guo Yuehua; Jiang Jialiang; Xie Saike	Sweden; Mikael Appelgren; Stellan Bengtsson; Ulf Bengtsson; Erik Lindh; Jan-Ove Waldner	Hungary; Gábor Gergely; István Jónyer; Zoltán Káposztás; Zsolt Kriston; János Molnár

== Swaythling Cup tables ==
=== Group A ===
Pos	Team	P	W	L	Pts
1	China	7	7	0	7
2	Sweden	7	6	1	6
3	France	7	4	3	4
4	South Korea	7	4	3	4
5	(Socialist Federal Republic of Yugoslavia) Yugoslavia	7	3	4	3
6	Czechoslovakia	7	2	5	2
7	West Germany	7	2	5	2
8	United States	7	0	7	0

=== Group B ===
Pos	Team	P	W	L	Pts
1	England	7	6	1	6
2	Hungary	7	6	1	6
3	Japan	7	6	1	6
4	North Korea	7	4	3	4
5	Poland	7	3	4	3
6	Italy	7	2	5	2
7	Soviet Union	7	1	6	1
8	Denmark	7	0	7	0

== Semifinals ==
Team One	Team Two	Score
Sweden	England	5–0
China	Hungary	5–0

== Third-place playoff ==
Team One	Team Two	Score
Hungary	England	5–2

== Final ==
China 5		Sweden 1	Score
Jiang Jialiang	bt	Waldner	18–21 21–17 21–14
Xie Saike	lost to	Appelgren	18–21 21–6 14–21
Cai Zhenhua	bt	Lindh	21–14 21–14
Jiang Jialiang	bt	Appelgren	21–10 21–13
Cai Zhenhua	bt	Waldner	30–28 21–16
Xie Saike	bt	Lindh	17–21 21–13 21–9

== See also ==
- List of World Table Tennis Championships medalists
