= 1985 World Table Tennis Championships – Women's team =

1985 Corbillon Cup (women's team)

The 1985 World Table Tennis Championships – Corbillon Cup (women's team) was the 31st edition of the women's team championship.

China won the gold medal defeating North Korea 3–0 in the final, South Korea won the bronze medal.

== Medalists ==
Event	Gold	Silver	Bronze
	China; Dai Lili; Geng Lijuan; He Zhili; Tong Ling	North Korea; Cho Jung-hui; Han Hye-Song; Li Bun-Hui; Pang Chun-Dok	South Korea; Lee Soo-ja; Lee Sun; Yang Young-Ja; Yoon Kyung-mi

== Final tables ==
=== Group A ===
Pos	Team	P	W	L	Pts
1	North Korea	7	7	0	7
2	Netherlands	7	5	2	5
3	Czechoslovakia	7	5	2	5
4	Japan	7	4	3	4
5	France	7	3	4	3
6	Romania	7	2	5	2
7	Hong Kong	7	2	5	2
8	West Germany	7	0	7	0

=== Group B ===
Pos	Team	P	W	L	Pts
1	China	7	7	0	7
2	South Korea	7	6	1	6
3	Hungary	7	5	2	5
4	Soviet Union	7	4	3	4
5	England	7	3	4	3
6	Sweden	7	2	5	2
7	(Socialist Federal Republic of Yugoslavia) Yugoslavia	7	1	6	1
8	Belgium	7	0	7	0

== Semifinals ==
Team One	Team Two	Score
North Korea	South Korea	3–1
China	Netherlands	3–0

== Third-place playoff ==
Team One	Team Two	Score
South Korea	Netherlands	3–1

== Final ==
Team One	Team Two	Score
China	North Korea	3–0

== See also ==
List of World Table Tennis Championships medalists
