= 1985 World Table Tennis Championships – Men's doubles =

1985 Men's doubles

The 1985 World Table Tennis Championships men's doubles was the 38th edition of the men's doubles championship. Mikael Appelgren and Ulf "Tickan" Carlsson won the title after defeating Milan Orlowski and Jindřich Panský in the final by two sets to nil. The event was changed from best of five sets to best of three sets.

== Results ==
Round of 16
(Sweden) Mikael Appelgren (Sweden) Ulf "Tickan" Carlsson	21	21
(Poland) Andrzej Grubba (England) Desmond Douglas	18	18
(West Germany) Engelbert Hüging (Austria) Ditmar Palmi	4	10
(China) Wang Huiyuan (China) Chen Longcan	21	21
(Hungary) Tibor Klampár (Hungary) Zsolt Kriston	21	21
(Nigeria) Atanda Musa (Nigeria) Francis Sule	16	16
(China) Fan Changmao (China) He Zhiwen	21	21
(South Korea) Ahn Jae-hyung (South Korea) Lee Jung-hak	10	10
(Czechoslovakia) Milan Orlowski (Czechoslovakia) Jindřich Panský	20	21	21
(North Korea) Cho Yong-Ho (North Korea) Hong Chol	22	17	17
(China) Xie Saike (China) Teng Yi	14	17
(Japan) Masao Shimizu (Japan) Yoshihito Miyazaki	21	21
(South Korea) Kim Wan (South Korea) Kim Ki-taik	21	21
(Chinese Taipei) Wu Wen-chia (Chinese Taipei) Huang Huei-Chien	12	15
(Italy) Massimo Constantini (Italy) Giovanni Bisi	21	8	17
(China) Cai Zhenhua (China) Jiang Jialiang	18	21	21

Quarterfinals
(Sweden) Appelgren (Sweden) Carlsson	21	16	21
(China) Wang Huiyuan (China) Chen Longcan	17	21	19
(Hungary) Klampár (Hungary) Kriston	19	22
(China) Fan Changmao (China) He Zhiwen	21	24
(Czechoslovakia) Orlowski (Czechoslovakia) Panský	17	21	21
(Japan) Shimizu (Japan) Miyazaki	21	17	17
(South Korea) Kim Wan (South Korea) Kim Ki-taik	17	18
(China) Cai Zhenhua (China) Jiang Jialiang	21	21

Semifinals
(Sweden) Appelgren (Sweden) Carlsson	21	21	21
(China) Fan Changmao (China) He Zhiwen	15	23	17
(Czechoslovakia) Orlowski (Czechoslovakia) Panský	21	16	21
(China) Cai Zhenhua (China) Jiang Jialiang	12	21	16

Final
(Sweden) Appelgren (Sweden) Carlsson	21	22
(Czechoslovakia) Orlowski (Czechoslovakia) Panský	15	20

== See also ==
List of World Table Tennis Championships medalists
