= 1981 World Table Tennis Championships – Women's singles =

1981 Women's singles

The 1981 World Table Tennis Championships women's singles was the 36th edition of the women's singles championship. Tong Ling defeated Cao Yanhua in the final by three sets to two, to win the title.

== Results ==
Round of 16
(China) Zhang Deying	21	21	21
(Netherlands) Bettine Vriesekoop	16	18	15
(China) Pu Qijuan	21	21	21
(Czechoslovakia) Ilona Uhlíková	12	12	19
(North Korea) Pak Yung-sun	22	21	8	21
(China) Geng Lijuan	20	11	21	15
(China) Tong Ling	21	21	21
(Soviet Union) Fliura Bulatova	19	16	11
(China) Qi Baoxiang	21	21	21
(Japan) Kayoko Kawahigashi	6	7	8
(South Korea) Lee Soo-ja	23	21	21
(North Korea) Li Song Suk	21	17	10
(China) Huang Junqun	21	21	21
(South Korea) Kim Kyung Ja	11	11	8
(China) Cao Yanhua	21	21	21
(Soviet Union) Valentina Popova	15	15	16

Quarterfinals
(China) Zhang Deying	21	21	21
(China) Pu Qijuan	11	9	13
(North Korea) Pak Yung Sun	21	22	12	12
(China) Tong Ling	19	24	21	21
(China) Qi Baoxiang	18	9	21	21	17
(South Korea) Lee Soo-ja	21	21	10	19	21
(China) Huang Junqun	13	11	10
(China) Cao Yanhua	21	21	21

Semifinals
(China) Zhang Deying	15	14	13
(China) Tong Ling	21	21	21
(South Korea) Lee Soo Ja	13	11	10
(China) Cao Yanhua	21	21	21

Final
(China) Tong Ling	21	16	21	18	21
(China) Cao Yanhua	19	21	17	21	15

== See also ==
- List of World Table Tennis Championships medalists
