= 1981 World Table Tennis Championships =

1981 edition of the World Table Tennis Championships

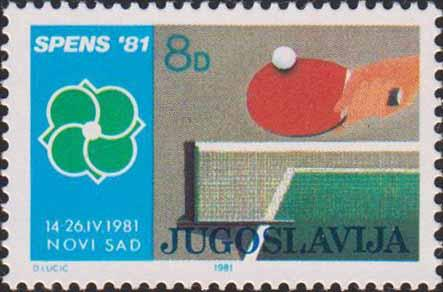
Yugoslav stamp dedicated to the 1981 World Table Tennis Championships

The 1981 World Table Tennis Championships were held in Novi Sad (Yugoslavia) from April 14 to April 26, 1981.

== Results ==
=== Team ===
Event	Gold	Silver	Bronze
Swaythling Cup; Men's Team	China; Cai Zhenhua; Guo Yuehua; Shi Zhihao; Wang Huiyuan; Xie Saike	Hungary; Gábor Gergely; István Jónyer; Tibor Klampár; Tibor Kreisz; Zsolt Kriston	Japan; Hiroyuki Abe; Hideo Gotoh; Masahiro Maehara; Seiji Ono; Norio Takashima
Corbillon Cup; Women's team	China; Cao Yanhua; Qi Baoxiang; Tong Ling; Zhang Deying	South Korea; An Hae-sook; Hwang Nam-sook; Kim Kyung-ja; Lee Soo-ja	North Korea; Kim Gyong-sun; Li Song Suk; Pak Yung-Sun

=== Individual ===
Event	Gold	Silver	Bronze
Men's singles	(China) Guo Yuehua	(China) Cai Zhenhua	(Socialist Federal Republic of Yugoslavia) Dragutin Šurbek
Men's singles	(China) Guo Yuehua	(China) Cai Zhenhua	(Sweden) Stellan Bengtsson
Women's singles	(China) Tong Ling	(China) Cao Yanhua	(China) Zhang Deying
Women's singles	(China) Tong Ling	(China) Cao Yanhua	(South Korea) Lee Soo-ja
Men's doubles	(China) Cai Zhenhua (China) Li Zhenshi	(China) Guo Yuehua (China) Xie Saike	(Socialist Federal Republic of Yugoslavia) Antun Stipančić (Socialist Federal Republic of Yugoslavia) Dragutin Šurbek
Men's doubles	(China) Cai Zhenhua (China) Li Zhenshi	(China) Guo Yuehua (China) Xie Saike	(France) Patrick Birocheau (France) Jacques Secrétin
Women's doubles	(China) Cao Yanhua (China) Zhang Deying	(China) Pu Qijuan (China) Tong Ling	(South Korea) An Hae-sook (South Korea) Hwang Nam-sook
Women's doubles	(China) Cao Yanhua (China) Zhang Deying	(China) Pu Qijuan (China) Tong Ling	(China) Huang Junqun (China) Yan Guili
Mixed doubles	(China) Xie Saike (China) Huang Junqun	(China) Chen Xinhua (China) Tong Ling	(China) Huang Liang (China) Pu Qijuan
Mixed doubles	(China) Xie Saike (China) Huang Junqun	(China) Chen Xinhua (China) Tong Ling	(Socialist Federal Republic of Yugoslavia) Dragutin Šurbek (Socialist Federal Republic of Yugoslavia) Branka Batinić
