= 1985 World Table Tennis Championships – Men's singles =

1985 Men's singles

The 1985 World Table Tennis Championships men's singles was the 38th edition of the men's singles championship.

Jiang Jialiang defeated Chen Longcan in the final, winning three sets to nil to secure the title.

== Results ==
Round of 16
(China) Jiang Jialiang	21	22	21
(Socialist Federal Republic of Yugoslavia) Dragutin Šurbek	14	20	16
(China) He Zhiwen	21	19	16	11
(South Korea) Kim Ki-taik	12	21	21	21
(China) Fan Changmao	20	20	8
(Hong Kong) Lo Chuen Chung	22	22	21
(China) Chen Xinhua	11	16	16
(Japan) Yoshihito Miyazaki	21	21	21
(China) Wang Huiyuan	21	10	17	21	21
(Sweden) Erik Lindh	19	21	21	13	15
(China) Chen Longcan	21	21	21
(Bulgaria) Mariano Loukov	19	18	12
(Sweden) Mikael Appelgren	15	14	21	12
(China) Teng Yi	21	21	19	21
(China) Xie Saike	16	19	21	21	21
(South Korea) Park Ji Hyun	21	21	9	19	15

Quarterfinals
(China) Jiang Jialiang	21	21	21
(South Korea) Kim Ki-taik	13	14	11
(Hong Kong) Lo Chuen Chung	24	18	21	21
(Japan) Miyazaki	22	21	19	15
(China) Wang Huiyuan	21	14	17	18
(China) Chen Longcan	17	21	21	21
(China) Teng Yi	21	19	21	22
(China) Xie Saike	12	21	12	20

Semifinals
(China) Jiang Jialiang	21	21	18	21
(Hong Kong) Lo Chuen Chung	17	18	21	11
(China) Chen Longcan	21	21	21
(China) Teng Yi	16	17	15

Final
(China) Jiang Jialiang	21	23	21
(China) Chen Longcan	14	21	18

== See also ==
List of World Table Tennis Championships medalists
