= 1980 Asian Table Tennis Championships =

- Date: 10–18 May 1980
- Edition: 5th
- Location: Calcutta, India

Champions

Men's singles
- (China) Shi Zhihao

Women's singles
- (China) Qi Baoxiang

Men's doubles
- (China) Guo Yuehua / (China) Xie Saike

Women's doubles
- (China) Liu Yang / (China) Zhang Deying

Mixed doubles
- (China) Xie Saike / (China) Zhang Deying

Men's team
- China

Women's team
- China
← 1978 ·	Asian Table Tennis Championships	· 1982 →

The 5th Asian Table Tennis Championships 1980 were held in Calcutta, India, from 10 to 18 May 1980. It was organised by the Table Tennis Federation of India under the authority of Asian Table Tennis Union (ATTU) and International Table Tennis Federation (ITTF).

== Medal summary ==
=== Medal table ===
Rank	Nation	Gold	Silver	Bronze	Total
1	China	7	4	5	16
2	North Korea	0	2	1	3
3	Japan	0	1	5	6
4	Hong Kong	0	0	1	1
Totals (4 entries)		7	7	12	26

=== Events ===
Event	Gold	Silver	Bronze
Men's singles	(China) Shi Zhihao	(China) Xie Saike	(China) Guo Yuehua
Men's singles	(China) Shi Zhihao	(China) Xie Saike	(China) Huang Liang
Women's singles	(China) Qi Baoxiang	(China) Liu Yang	(China) Tong Ling
Women's singles	(China) Qi Baoxiang	(China) Liu Yang	(Hong Kong) Hui So Hung
Men's doubles	(China) Guo Yuehua (China) Xie Saike	(China) Cai Zhenhua (China) Shi Zhihao	(Japan) Kaku Chida (Japan) Hideo Gotoh
Men's doubles	(China) Guo Yuehua (China) Xie Saike	(China) Cai Zhenhua (China) Shi Zhihao	(Japan) Shigero Fukue (Japan) Satsuki Horime
Women's doubles	(China) Liu Yang (China) Zhang Deying	(North Korea) Hong Gil-soon (North Korea) Pak Yong-ok	(China) Qi Baoxiang (China) Tong Ling
Women's doubles	(China) Liu Yang (China) Zhang Deying	(North Korea) Hong Gil-soon (North Korea) Pak Yong-ok	(Japan) Mana Shigetake (Japan) Rie Wada
Mixed doubles	(China) Xie Saike (China) Zhang Deying	(China) Guo Yuehua (China) Liu Yang	(China) Cai Zhenhua (China) Qi Baoxiang
Mixed doubles	(China) Xie Saike (China) Zhang Deying	(China) Guo Yuehua (China) Liu Yang	(Japan) Shigero Fukue (Japan) Yoshiko Shimauchi
Men's team	China	Japan	North Korea
Women's team	China	North Korea	Japan

== See also ==
- World Table Tennis Championships
- Asian Cup
