= 1985 World Table Tennis Championships – Women's singles =

1985 Women's singles

The 1985 World Table Tennis Championships women's singles was the 38th edition of the women's singles championship. Cao Yanhua defeated Geng Lijuan in the final by three sets to one, to win the title.

== Results ==
Round of 16
(China) Cao Yanhua	21	19	21	21
(South Korea) Yoon Kyung-mi	11	21	9	12
(China) Tong Ling	21	21	21
(Czechoslovakia) Alice Pelikanova	12	15	12
(China) Ni Xialian	21	21	22
(Netherlands) Bettine Vriesekoop	11	16	20
(China) Qi Baoxiang	21	21	21
(Hong Kong) Mok Ka Sha	8	14	16
(China) Geng Lijuan	21	21	21
(Romania) Maria Alboiu	5	19	15
(China) Jiao Zhimin	21	23	21
(South Korea) Yang Young-ja	13	21	14
(North Korea) Pang Chun-Dok	21	21	21
(Romania) Olga Nemeș	14	18	18
(China) Dai Lili	21	21	21
(Soviet Union) Fliura Bulatova	9	12	11

Quarterfinals
(China) Cao Yanhua	20	21	21	21
(China) Tong Ling	22	16	19	15
(China) Ni Xialian	13	21	13	18
(China) Qi Baoxiang	21	16	21	21
(China) Geng Lijuan	16	19	21	21	21
(China) Jiao Zhimin	21	21	12	17	17
(North Korea) Pang Chun Dok	10	12	8
(China) Dai Lili	21	21	21

Semifinals
(China) Cao Yanhua	21	21	16	19	21
(China) Qi Baoxiang	13	7	21	21	15
(China) Geng Lijuan	19	21	20	21	21
(China) Dai Lili	21	19	22	19	17

Final
(China) Cao Yanhua	21	21	10	21
(China) Geng Lijuan	12	16	21	16

== See also ==
List of World Table Tennis Championships medalists
