= 1955 Mitropa Cup =

Tournament details
- Dates: 29 June – 4 August 1955
- Teams: 10

Final positions
- Champions: (Hungary) Vörös Lobogó (1st title)
- Runners-up: (Czechoslovakia) ÚDA Praha

Tournament statistics
- Matches played: 20
- Goals scored: 98 (4.9 per match)

The 1955 Mitropa Cup was the 15th season of the Mitropa football club tournament. It was won by Vörös Lobogó who beat ÚDA Praha in the two-legged final 8–1 on aggregate.

== Preliminary round ==
Matches played between 29 June and 5 July 1955.

Team 1	Agg.	Team 2	1st leg	2nd leg
Vörös Lobogó (Hungary)	5–5^{1}	(Austria) Wacker Wien	3–3	2–2
Vojvodina (Socialist Federal Republic of Yugoslavia)	9–5	(Italy) Roma	4–1	5–4

^{1} Vörös Lobogó beat Wacker Wien 5–1 in a play-off to qualify for the Quarter-finals.

=== First leg ===
29 June 1955

Vörös Lobogó (Hungary)	3 – 3	(Austria) Wacker Wien
Arató 8'; Kárász 53', 58'	Report	Kaubek 10', 66'; Haummer 17'

Népstadion, Budapest
Attendance: 45,000

=== Second leg ===
2 July 1955

Wacker Wien (Austria)	2 – 2	(Hungary) Vörös Lobogó
Kovács 20' (o.g.); Kaubek 40'	Report	Chalupetzky 1' (o.g.); Hidegkuti 42'

Praterstadion, Vienna
Attendance: 22,000

Play-off

5 July 1955

Wacker Wien (Austria)	1 – 5	(Hungary) Vörös Lobogó
Brousek 20' (pen.)	Report	Hidegkuti 13', 70'; Molnár 14', 39', 50'

Praterstadion, Vienna
Attendance: 15,000

== Quarter-finals ==
Matches played between 6 and 13 July 1955.

Team 1	Agg.	Team 2	1st leg	2nd leg
Honvéd Budapest (Hungary)	10–6	(Austria) Wiener Sport-Club	5–2	5–4
Bologna (Italy)	2–7	(Czechoslovakia) ÚDA Praha	2–4	0–3
Vojvodina (Socialist Federal Republic of Yugoslavia)	0–3	(Czechoslovakia) Slovan Bratislava	0–0	0–3
Vörös Lobogó (Hungary)	8–3	(Socialist Federal Republic of Yugoslavia) Hajduk Split	6–0	2–3

=== First leg ===
6 July 1955

Honvéd Budapest (Hungary)	5 – 2	(Austria) Wiener Sport-Club
Tichy 11'; Kocsis 13', 72', 81'; Puskás 23' (pen.)	Report	Miessler 3', 18'

Népstadion, Budapest
Attendance: 50,000

6 July 1955

Bologna (Italy)	2 – 4	(Czechoslovakia) ÚDA Praha
		Přáda; Masopust

Stadio Littoriale, Bologna
Attendance: 12,000

6 July 1955

Vojvodina (Socialist Federal Republic of Yugoslavia)	0 – 0	(Czechoslovakia) Slovan Bratislava

Vojvodina Stadium, Novy Sad
Attendance: 20,000
Referee: Pribyl (Austria)

9 July 1955

Vörös Lobogó (Hungary)	6 – 0	(Socialist Federal Republic of Yugoslavia) Hajduk Split
Molnár 4'; Szimcsák 12'; Sándor 32', 51'; Kárász 37'; Hidegkuti 70'	Report

Népstadion, Budapest
Attendance: 15,000

=== Second leg ===
9 July 1955

Wiener Sport-Club (Austria)	4 – 5	(Hungary) Honvéd Budapest
Horak 22'; Szokol 60'; Miessler 63' (pen.); Hof 90'	Report	Czibor 24', 78'; Kocsis 26'; Puskás 54'; Bozsik 61'

Wiener Sportclub-Platz, Vienna
Attendance: 13,000

Honvéd Budapest won 10–6 on aggregate.

10 July 1955

ÚDA Praha (Czechoslovakia)	3 – 0	(Italy) Bologna
Kraus; Přáda

Stadion čs. armády, Prague
Attendance: 50,000
Referee: Harangozo (Hungary)

ÚDA Praha won 7–2 on aggregate.

10 July 1955

Slovan Bratislava (Czechoslovakia)	3 – 0	(Socialist Federal Republic of Yugoslavia) Vojvodina
Pažický 17'; Bílý 51', 78'

Tehelné pole, Bratislava
Attendance: 40,000
Referee: Pósa (Hungary)

Slovan Bratislava won 3–0 on aggregate.

13 July 1955

Hajduk Split (Socialist Federal Republic of Yugoslavia)	3 – 2	(Hungary) Vörös Lobogó
Matošić 49'; Vukas 70'; Vidošević 79'	Report	Hidegkuti 64'; Sándor 66'

Stari plac, Split
Attendance: 20,000

Vörös Lobogó won 8–3 on aggregate.

== Semi-finals ==
Matches played between 18 and 23 July 1955.

Team 1	Agg.	Team 2	1st leg	2nd leg	Play-off
Honvéd Budapest (Hungary)	6–7	(Hungary) Vörös Lobogó	5–2	1–5	
ÚDA Praha (Czechoslovakia)	2–2	(Czechoslovakia) Slovan Bratislava	0–0	2–2	2–1

=== First leg ===
17 July 1955

ÚDA Praha (Czechoslovakia)	0 – 0	(Czechoslovakia) Slovan Bratislava

Stadion čs. armády, Prague
Attendance: 25,000
Referee: János Pósa (Hungary)
18 July 1955

Honvéd Budapest (Hungary)	5 – 2	(Hungary) Vörös Lobogó
Machos 10', 79'; Czibor 12'; Kocsis 14', 53'	Report	Molnár 16'; Kárász 40'

Népstadion, Budapest
Attendance: 75,000

=== Second leg ===
22 July 1955

Slovan Bratislava (Czechoslovakia)	2 – 2	(Czechoslovakia) ÚDA Praha
Vičan; Jajcaj 88'		Kraus; Pazdera

Tehelné pole, Bratislava
Attendance: 10,000
Referee: Pribyl (Austria)

ÚDA Praha 2–2 Slovan Bratislava on aggregate; play-off needed.

23 July 1955

Vörös Lobogó (Hungary)	5 – 1	(Hungary) Honvéd Budapest
Molnár 4', 37', 42'; Kovács 22' (pen.), 66'	Report	Puskás 44'

Népstadion, Budapest
Attendance: 50,000

Vörös Lobogó won 7–6 on aggregate.

=== Play-off ===
25 July 1955

ÚDA Praha (Czechoslovakia)	2 – 1	(Czechoslovakia) Slovan Bratislava
Pluskal 52'; Hlaváček 59'		Tegelhoff 66'

Stadion Za Lužánkami, Brno
Attendance: 50,000
Referee: Friedrich Mayer (Austria)

== Final ==
Team 1	Agg.	Team 2	1st leg	2nd leg
Vörös Lobogó (Hungary)	8–1	(Czechoslovakia) ÚDA Praha	6–0	2–1

=== First leg ===
30 July 1955

Vörös Lobogó (Hungary)	6 – 0	(Czechoslovakia) ÚDA Praha
Hidegkuti 4', 14', 43'; Kárász 12'; Novák 71' (o.g.); Molnár 76'	Report

Népstadion, Budapest
Attendance: 70,000

=== Second leg ===
4 August 1955

ÚDA Praha (Czechoslovakia)	1 – 2	(Hungary) Vörös Lobogó
Přáda 31'	Report	Hidegkuti 55'; Palotás 88'

Československé armády-Strahov, Prague
Attendance: 50,000

== See also ==
- 1955–56 European Cup
