= 1981 World Table Tennis Championships – Men's singles =

1981 Men's singles

The 1981 World Table Tennis Championships men's singles was the 36th edition of the men's singles championship.

Guo Yuehua defeated Cai Zhenhua in the final, winning three sets to one to secure the title.

== Results ==
Round of 16
(South Korea) Park Lee hee	21	11	21	20
(China) Lu Yaohua	23	21	19	22
(Hungary) István Jónyer	12	15	15
(China) Cai Zhenhua	21	21	21
(Sweden) Stellan Bengtsson	21	20	21	17	21
(China) Huang Liang	14	22	13	21	10
(England) Desmond Douglas	16	19	14
(China) Shi Zhihao	21	21	21
(China) Wang Huiyuan	18	11	21	21	21
(Czechoslovakia) Milan Orlowski	21	21	14	17	11
(Socialist Federal Republic of Yugoslavia) Dragutin Šurbek	16	21	21	21
(Sweden) Erik Lindh	21	17	19	17
(Hungary) Tibor Klampár	21	21	21
(Sweden) Mikael Appelgren	18	19	15
(China) Guo Yuehua	21	21	21
(Poland) Andrzej Grubba	14	16	11

Quarterfinals
(China) Lu Yaohua	20	19	19
(China) Cai Zhenhua	22	21	21
(Sweden) Bengtsson	24	10	21	21
(China) Shi Zhihao	22	21	18	18
(China) Wang Huiyuan	19	17	11
(Socialist Federal Republic of Yugoslavia) Šurbek	21	21	21
(Hungary) Klampár	21	15	13	18
(China) Guo Yuehua	19	21	21	21

Semifinals
(China) Cai Zhenhua	21	21	13	17	21
(Sweden) Bengtsson	14	9	21	21	16
(Socialist Federal Republic of Yugoslavia) Šurbek	18	15	11
(China) Guo Yuehua	21	21	21

Final
(China) Cai Zhenhua	14	21	14	16
(China) Guo Yuehua	21	17	21	21

== See also ==
List of World Table Tennis Championships medalists
