= Kim Kyung-ja =

South Korean table tennis player

Personal information
- Nationality: South Korea
Medal record
Representing South Korea
World Table Tennis Championships
Silver medal – second place	1981	women's team

Kim Kyung-ja is a female former international table tennis player from South Korea.

== Table tennis career ==
She won a silver medal at the 1981 World Table Tennis Championships in the Corbillon Cup (women's team event) with An Hae-sook, Hwang Nam-sook and Lee Soo-ja for South Korea.

== See also ==
- List of World Table Tennis Championships medalists
