= Table tennis at the Friendship Games =

Table tennis at the Friendship Games took place in Pyongyang, North Korea between 7 and 20 July 1984. 7 events (3 men's, 3 women's, and mixed play) were contested.

== Medal summary ==
=== Men's events ===
Event	Gold	Silver	Bronze
Men's singles	(North Korea) Cho Yong-ho	(North Korea) Chu Jong-Chol	(China) Jia Ning
Men's singles	(North Korea) Cho Yong-ho	(North Korea) Chu Jong-Chol	(North Korea) Li Gun-Sang
Men's doubles	(Japan) Hiroyuki Abe (Japan) Seiji Ono	(North Korea) Cho Yong-ho (North Korea) Hong Chol	(Czechoslovakia) Tomas Demek (Czechoslovakia) Jiri Javurek
Men's doubles	(Japan) Hiroyuki Abe (Japan) Seiji Ono	(North Korea) Cho Yong-ho (North Korea) Hong Chol	(China) Gu Wanyan (China) Jia Ning
Men's team	North Korea	Soviet Union	China

=== Women's events ===
Event	Gold	Silver	Bronze
Women's singles	(China) Qi Baohua	(Czechoslovakia) Marie Hrachová	(North Korea) Cho Jong-Hui
Women's singles	(China) Qi Baohua	(Czechoslovakia) Marie Hrachová	(North Korea) Han Hye-Song
Women's doubles	(North Korea) Cho Jong-Hui (North Korea) Li Bun-Hui	(China) Gao Jun (China) Qi Baohua	(Soviet Union) Narine Antonian (Soviet Union) Valentina Popova
Women's doubles	(North Korea) Cho Jong-Hui (North Korea) Li Bun-Hui	(China) Gao Jun (China) Qi Baohua	(Soviet Union) Fliura Bulatova (Soviet Union) Anita Zakharian
Women's team	China	North Korea	Czechoslovakia

=== Mixed events ===
Event	Gold	Silver	Bronze
Mixed doubles	(North Korea) Hong Chol (North Korea) Kim Yong-Hi	(North Korea) Cho Yong-ho (North Korea) Li Bun-Hui	(China) Jia Ning (China) Fan Jianxin

== Medal table ==
* Host nation (North Korea)

Rank	Nation	Gold	Silver	Bronze	Total
1	North Korea (PRK)*	4	4	3	11
2	China (CHN)	2	1	4	7
3	Japan (JPN)	1	0	0	1
4	Czechoslovakia (TCH)	0	1	2	3
4	Soviet Union (URS)	0	1	2	3
Totals (5 entries)		7	7	11	25
