= Simon Gerada =

Australian table tennis player

Medal record

Men's Table tennis

Representing Malta

Games of the Small States of Europe
Silver medal – second place	2011 Liechtenstein	Doubles
Bronze medal – third place	2013 Luxembourg	Team

Simon Gerada (born 20 March 1981) is a right-handed Australian/Maltese Table Tennis Player. His father, Joe Gerada was born in Malta and emigrated to Australia in the 1980s. Simon Gerada was born and brought up in Melbourne, Australia and began playing at the age of 9 after he witnessed his father win a shopping centre tournament. He represented Victoria in national junior tournaments. He also competed at the 2000 Summer Olympics.

After transitioned from a player to a coach, Simon established his own table tennis club, Loops.

Simon is currently employed by Table Tennis Australia in a full time capacity as the Performance and Pathways Lead (able bodied program).
