= Table tennis at the 2013 Games of the Small States of Europe =

Table tennis at the 2013 Games of the Small States of Europe was held from 28 May – 1 June 2013 at d'Coque, Luxembourg.

== Medal summary ==
=== Medal table ===
* Host nation (Luxembourg)

Rank	Nation	Gold	Silver	Bronze	Total
1	Luxembourg*	5	1	1	7
2	Montenegro	1	0	1	2
3	Monaco	0	2	3	5
4	Malta	0	2	1	3
5	San Marino	0	1	0	1
6	Cyprus	0	0	2	2
Totals (6 entries)		6	6	8	20

=== Men ===
Event	Gold	Silver	Bronze
Singles	Irfan Ćekić (MNE)	Traian Ciociu (LUX)	Marios Yiangou (CYP)
Singles	Irfan Ćekić (MNE)	Traian Ciociu (LUX)	Anthony Peretti (MON)
Doubles	Luxembourg; Mike Bast; Gilles Michely	Monaco; Anthony Peretti; David Samson	Montenegro; Irfan Ćekić; Viktor Rogić
Team	Luxembourg; Mike Bast; Traian Ciociu; Gilles Michely	Monaco; Anthony Peretti; David Samson; Martin Tiso	Malta; Daniel Bajada; Simon Gerada

=== Women ===
Event	Gold	Silver	Bronze
Singles	Sarah de Nutte (LUX)	Letizia Giardi (SMR)	Kouiza Kourea (CYP)
Singles	Sarah de Nutte (LUX)	Letizia Giardi (SMR)	Tessy Gonderinger (LUX)
Doubles	Luxembourg; Ni Xialian; Sarah de Nutte	Malta; Viktoria Lucenkova; Lu Pengfei	Monaco; Ulrika Quist; Lauren Riley
Team	Luxembourg; Ni Xialian; Sarah de Nutte; Tessy Gonderinger	Malta; Viktoria Lucenkova; Lu Pengfei; Jessica Pace	Monaco; Ulrika Quist; Lauren Riley
