= Table tennis at the 2011 Games of the Small States of Europe =

Tennis competition

Table tennis at the 2011 Games of the Small States of Europe will be held from 31 May – 4 June 2011.

== Medal summary ==
=== Men ===
Event	Gold	Silver	Bronze
Singles	Traian Ciociu (LUX)	Irfan Čekić (MNE)	Gilles Michely (LUX)
Singles	Traian Ciociu (LUX)	Irfan Čekić (MNE)	Marios Yiangou (CYP)
Doubles	Cyprus; Marios Yiangou; Onjan Serafimov	Malta; Simon Gerada; Daniel Bajada	Montenegro; Irfan Cekic; Luka Bakic
Doubles	Cyprus; Marios Yiangou; Onjan Serafimov	Malta; Simon Gerada; Daniel Bajada	Luxembourg; Gilles Michely; Mike Bast
Team	Cyprus; Marios Yiangou; Onjan Serafimov	Luxembourg; Gilles Michely; Traian Ciociu; Mike Bast	San Marino; Wang Daqi; Marco Vannucci
Team	Cyprus; Marios Yiangou; Onjan Serafimov	Luxembourg; Gilles Michely; Traian Ciociu; Mike Bast	Montenegro; Irfan Cekic; Luka Bakic

=== Women ===
Event	Gold	Silver	Bronze
Singles	Ni Xialian (LUX)	Sarah De Nutte (LUX)	Louiza Kourea (CYP)
Singles	Ni Xialian (LUX)	Sarah De Nutte (LUX)	Letizia Giardi (SMR)
Doubles	Luxembourg; Ni Xialian; Vinita Schlink	Cyprus; Louiza Kourea; Ana Mikova	San Marino; Letizia Giardi; Chiara Boffa
Team	Luxembourg; Ni Xialian; Sarah De Nutte; Vinita Schlink	San Marino; Chiara Boffa; Letizia Giardi	Cyprus; Louiza Kourea; Ana Mikova

=== Medal table ===
Rank	Nation	Gold	Silver	Bronze	Total
1	Luxembourg	4	2	2	8
2	Cyprus	2	1	3	6
3	San Marino	0	1	3	4
4	Montenegro	0	1	2	3
5	Malta	0	1	0	1
Totals (5 entries)		6	6	10	22
