= Ängby SK =

Sports club in Ängby, Sweden

- Full name: Ängby sportklubb
- Sport: table tennis
- Founded: 1956
- Based in: Vällingby, Sweden
- Arena: Vällingbyhallen

Ängby SK is a sports club in Vällingby, Sweden. Established in 1956, the club won the Swedish national men's table tennis team championship in 1992 and 1995. Jan-Ove Waldner and Mikael Appelgren have played for the club.

During the 2014-2015 season, the women's team won the Swedish national championship.
