= Lo Chuen Tsung =

Hong Kong table tennis player

Lo Chuen Tsung (Lo Chuen Chung)
Personal information
- Nationality: Hong Kong
- Born: 盧傳淞, Jyutping: Lou4 Cyun4 Sung1; Pinyin: Lú Chuán-sōng; 8 October 1963 (age 62)
Medal record
Representing Hong Kong
World Table Tennis Championships
Bronze medal – third place	1985	Men's Singles

Lo Chuen Tsung (born 8 October 1963), also known as Lo Chuen Chung, is a Hong Kong former table tennis player.

== Career ==
In table tennis, Lo was one of the top players in the world in the 1980s, reaching a No. 7 ranking in 1985.

Lo played at the 1988, 1992, and 1996 Summer Olympics. He was originally from mainland China.

Lo won a bronze medal at the 1985 World Table Tennis Championships in the men's singles.

== See also ==
- List of table tennis players
- List of World Table Tennis Championships medalists
