= Stefan Dryszel =

Polish table tennis player

Personal information
- Nationality: Poland
- Born: 25 December 1958 (age 67) Stanica
Medal record
Representing Poland
World Table Tennis Championships
Bronze medal – third place	1985	Men's Team

Stefan Dryszel (born 1958) is a male Polish former international table tennis player.

He won a bronze medal at the 1985 World Table Tennis Championships in the Swaythling Cup (men's team event) with Andrzej Grubba, Andrzej Jakubowicz, Leszek Kucharski and Norbert Mnich for Poland.

He also won two European Table Tennis Championships medals in 1984 and 1986.

== See also ==
- List of table tennis players
- List of World Table Tennis Championships medalists
