= Norbert Mnich =

Polish table tennis player

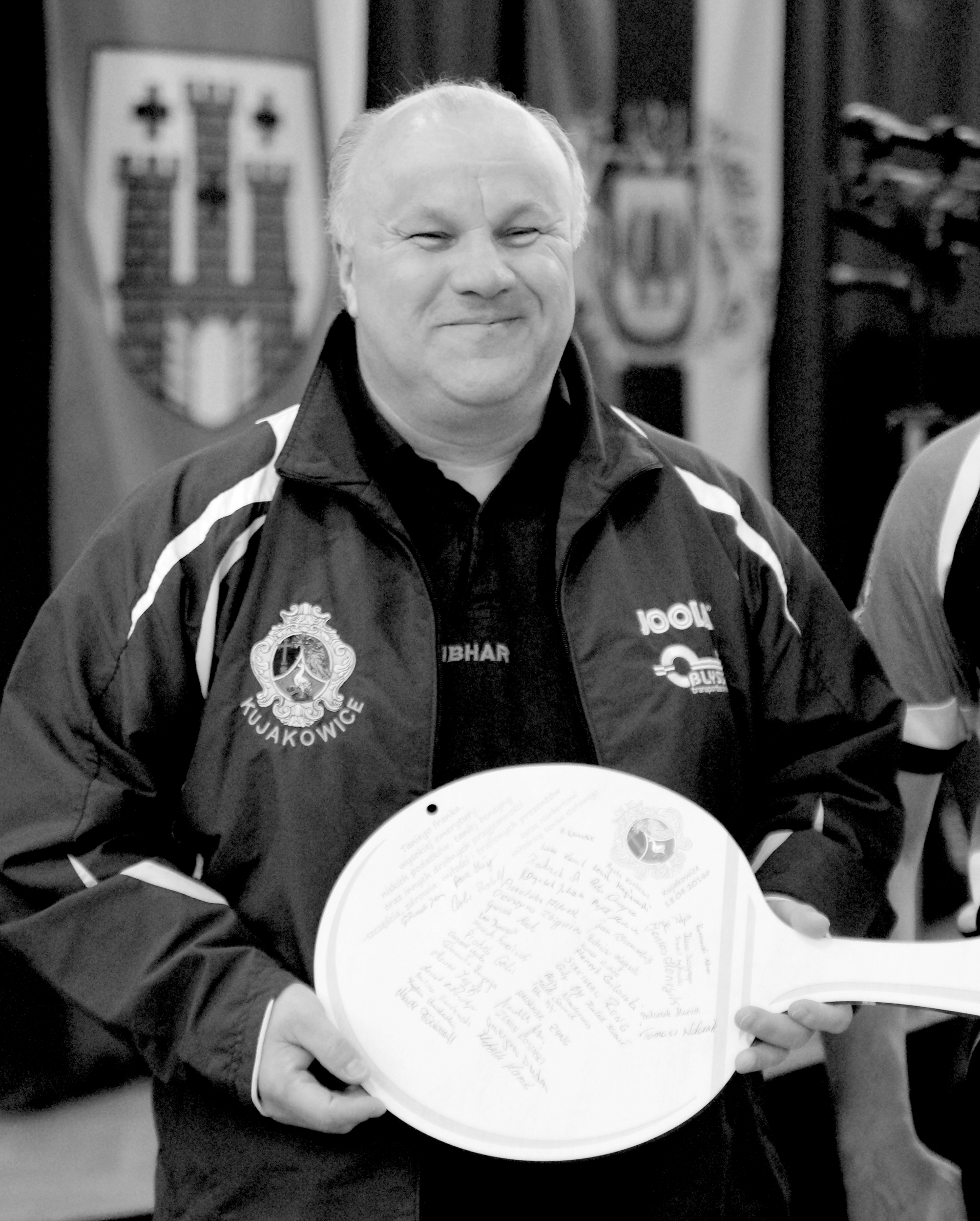

Personal information
- Nationality: Poland
- Born: 18 April 1966 Kluczbork
- Died: 30 September 2016 (aged 50) Chocianowice
Medal record
Representing Poland
World Table Tennis Championships
Bronze medal – third place	1985	Men's Team

Norbert Mnich (born 1966–2016) was a male Polish international table tennis player.

He won a bronze medal at the 1985 World Table Tennis Championships in the Swaythling Cup (men's team event) with Andrzej Grubba, Andrzej Jakubowicz, Leszek Kucharski and Stefan Dryszel for Poland.

He also won a European Table Tennis Championships medal in 1986.

== See also ==
- List of table tennis players
- List of World Table Tennis Championships medalists
