= Adalbert Kaubek =

Austrian footballer

Personal information
- Date of birth: 7 April 1926
- Date of death: 31 December 2011 (aged 85)

International career
Years	Team	Apps	(Gls)
1955–1956	Austria	2	(0)

Adalbert Kaubek (7 April 1926 – 31 December 2011) was an Austrian footballer. He played in two matches for the Austria national football team from 1955 to 1956.
