= Yang Yuhua =

Chinese table tennis player

Personal information
- Nationality: China
Medal record
Representing China
World Table Tennis Championships
Bronze medal – third place	1983	Men's Doubles

Yang Yuhua is a male former Chinese international table tennis player.

He won a bronze medal at the 1983 World Table Tennis Championships in the men's doubles with Wang Huiyuan.

== See also ==
- List of table tennis players
- List of World Table Tennis Championships medalists
