= Zoltán Káposztás =

Hungarian table tennis player

Personal information
- Nationality: Hungary
Medal record
Representing Hungary
World Table Tennis Championships
Bronze medal – third place	1983	Men's Team

Zoltan Kaposztas is a male former international table tennis player from Hungary.

He won a bronze medal at the 1983 World Table Tennis Championships in the Swaythling Cup (men's team event) with Gábor Gergely, István Jónyer, Zsolt Kriston and János Molnár for Hungary.

== See also ==
- List of table tennis players
- List of World Table Tennis Championships medalists
