= Andrzej Jakubowicz =

Polish table tennis player

Personal information
- Nationality: Poland
- Born: 28 January 1958 (age 68) Rymanów
Medal record
Representing Poland
World Table Tennis Championships
Bronze medal – third place	1985	Men's Team

Andrzej Jakubowicz (born 1958) is a Polish former international table tennis player.

He won a bronze medal at the 1985 World Table Tennis Championships in the Swaythling Cup (men's team event) with Andrzej Grubba, Stefan Dryszel, Leszek Kucharski and Norbert Mnich for Poland.

He also won two European Table Tennis Championships medals in 1984 and 1986.

== See also ==
- List of table tennis players
- List of World Table Tennis Championships medalists
