= Yoon Kyung-mi =

South Korean table tennis player

Personal information
- Nationality: South Korea
Medal record
Representing South Korea
World Table Tennis Championships
Bronze medal – third place	1985	women's team

Yoon Kyung-mi is a female former international table tennis player from South Korea.

== Table tennis career ==
She won a bronze medal for South Korea at the 1985 World Table Tennis Championships in the Corbillon Cup (women's team event) with Lee Soo-ja, Lee Sun and Yang Young-Ja.

She also won three Asian Games medals.

== See also ==
- List of World Table Tennis Championships medalists
