= Chen Xinhua =

Chinese table tennis player

Personal information
- Full name: CHEN Xinhua
- Nationality: China Great Britain
- Born: 30 January 1960 (age 66)

Sport
- Sport: Table tennis
Medal record
Men's table tennis
Representing China
World Championships
Gold medal – first place	1985 Gothenburg	Men's team
Gold medal – first place	1987 New Delhi	Men's team
Silver medal – second place	1981 Novi Sad	Mixed doubles
Silver medal – second place	1983 Tokyo	Mixed doubles
Bronze medal – third place	1985 Gothenburg	Mixed Doubles
Bronze medal – third place	1987 New Delhi	Singles
World Cup
Gold medal – first place	1985 Foshan	Singles
Asian Championships
Gold medal – first place	1978 Kuala Lumpur	Men's Team
Bronze medal – third place	1978 Kuala Lumpur	Singles
Representing England
World Cup
Bronze medal – third place	1990 Chiba City	Men's Team
European Championships
Silver medal – second place	1992 Stuttgart	Men's Team

Chen Xinhua (born 30 January 1960) is a former international table tennis player. He competed for Great Britain at the 1996 Summer Olympics.

== Table tennis career ==
He is from China, but obtained the British citizenship in 1990. From 1978 to 1992 he won several medals in singles, doubles, and team events in the World Table Tennis Championships. He is also the winner of Table Tennis World Cup in 1985.

He also won an English Open title.

== See also ==
- List of table tennis players
- List of World Table Tennis Championships medalists
