= Han Hye-song =

North Korean table tennis player

Personal information
- Nationality: North Korea
Medal record
Representing North Korea
World Table Tennis Championships
| Silver medal – second place | 1985 | women's team |

Han Hye-Song is a former international table tennis player from North Korea.

== Table tennis career ==
She won a silver medal for North Korea at the 1985 World Table Tennis Championships in the Corbillon Cup (women's team event) with Cho Jung-hui, Li Bun-Hui and Pang Chun-Dok.

== See also ==
- List of World Table Tennis Championships medalists
