= Mika Hoshino =

Japanese table tennis player

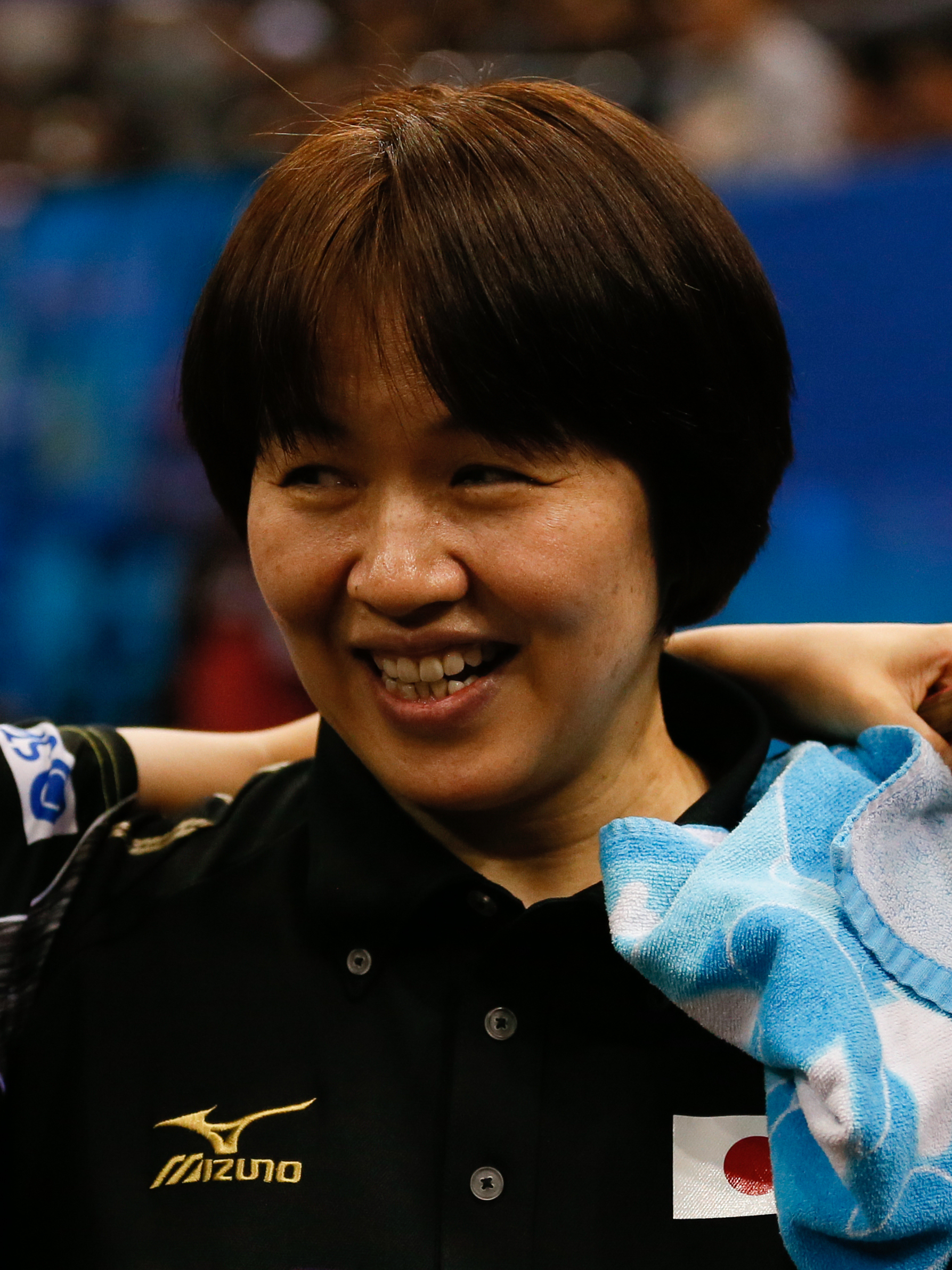
- Portrait of Mika Hoshino

Personal information
- Nationality: Japan
- Born: July 10, 1965 (age 60) Katashina, Gunma
Medal record
Representing Japan
World Table Tennis Championships
Silver medal – second place	1983	women's team

Mika Hoshino (born 10 July 1965) is a former international table tennis player from Japan.

== Table tennis career ==
She won a silver medal for Japan at the 1983 World Table Tennis Championships in the Corbillon Cup (women's team event) with Emiko Kanda, Fumiko Shinpo and Tomoko Tamura.

Mika participated in two Olympic Games in 1988 and 1992.

== See also ==
- List of World Table Tennis Championships medalists
