= Fumiko Shinpo =

Japanese table tennis player

Personal information
- Nationality: Japan
Medal record
Representing Japan
World Table Tennis Championships
Silver medal – second place	1983	women's team

Fumiko Shinpo is a former international table tennis player from Japan.

== Table tennis career ==
She won a silver medal for Japan at the 1983 World Table Tennis Championships in the Corbillon Cup (women's team event) with Mika Hoshino, Tomoko Tamura and Emiko Kanda.

She won two Asian Games medals in 1974 and 1978.

== See also ==
- List of World Table Tennis Championships medalists
