= Fan Changmao =

Chinese table tennis player

Personal information
- Nationality: China
- Born: 8 April 1963 (age 63)
Medal record
Men's table tennis
Representing China
World Table Tennis Championships
Gold medal – first place	1983 Tokyo	Men's team
Bronze medal – third place	1985 Göteborg	Men's doubles
Bronze medal – third place	1985 Göteborg	Mixed doubles

Fan Changmao (born April 8, 1963) is a male former Chinese international table tennis player.

He won a gold medal at the 1983 World Table Tennis Championships in the team event.

He also won two bronze medals in the men's doubles with He Zhiwen and the mixed doubles with Jiao Zhimin at the 1985 World Table Tennis Championships.

He also won an English Open title.

== See also ==
- List of table tennis players
- List of World Table Tennis Championships medalists
