= Branka Batinić =

Croatian table tennis player

Personal information
- Nationality: Croatia
- Born: May 8, 1958 Vinkovci, SR Croatia; SFR Yugoslavia

Sport
- Sport: Table tennis
Medal record
Women's table tennis
Representing Yugoslavia
European Championships
Bronze medal – third place	1981 Novi Sad	Doubles

Branka Batinić is a Croatian and former Yugoslav international table tennis player, who participated in six world championships and represented Yugoslavia over 250 times in tournaments in the 1970s and 1980s.

== Table tennis career ==
She won a bronze medal at the 1981 World Table Tennis Championships in the mixed doubles with Dragutin Šurbek.

She is active in the Veteran's Championships in Europe and coach.

== See also ==
- List of table tennis players
- List of World Table Tennis Championships medalists

Awards
Preceded by Nataša Urbančič	Yugoslav Sportswoman of the Year; 1975	Succeeded by Mima Jaušovec
