= Pang Chun-dok =

North Korean table tennis player

Pang Chun-Dok
Personal information
- Nationality: North Korea
Medal record
Representing North Korea
World Table Tennis Championships
Silver medal – second place	1985	women's team

Pang Chun-Dok is a former international table tennis player from North Korea.

== Table tennis career ==
She won a silver medal for North Korea at the 1985 World Table Tennis Championships in the Corbillon Cup (women's team event) with Cho Jung-hui, Li Bun-Hui and Han Hye-Song.

She also reached the quarter-finals of the women's singles and doubles during the 1985 World Championships.

== See also ==
- List of World Table Tennis Championships medalists
