= Shen Jianping =

Chinese table tennis player

Personal information
- Nationality: China
- Born: 1961 (age 64–65)
Medal record
Representing China
World Table Tennis Championships
Gold medal – first place	1983	doubles

Shen Jianping (born 1961) is a former female Chinese international table tennis player.

== Table tennis career ==
She won a gold medal at the 1983 World Table Tennis Championships in the women's doubles with Dai Lili.

== See also ==
- List of table tennis players
- List of World Table Tennis Championships medalists
