= Emiko Kanda =

Japanese table tennis player

Personal information
- Nationality: Japan
Medal record
Representing Japan
World Table Tennis Championships
| Silver medal – second place | 1983 | women's team |

Emiko Kanda is a former international table tennis player from Japan.

== Table tennis career ==
She won a silver medal for Japan at the 1984 World Table Tennis Championships in the Corbillon Cup (women's team event) with Mika Hoshino, Fumiko Shinpo and Tomoko Tamura.

== See also ==
- List of World Table Tennis Championships medalists
