= János Molnár =

Hungarian table tennis player

Personal information
- Nationality: Hungary
Medal record
Representing Hungary
World Table Tennis Championships
Bronze medal – third place	1983	Men's Team

János Molnár is a former international table tennis player from Hungary, who won a European Table Tennis Championships gold medal in 1982. He also won a bronze medal at the 1983 World Table Tennis Championships in the Swaythling Cup (men's team event) with Gábor Gergely, István Jónyer, Zsolt Kriston and Zoltán Káposztás for Hungary.

== See also ==
- List of table tennis players
- List of World Table Tennis Championships medalists
