= Hwang Nam-sook =

South Korean table tennis player

Personal information
- Nationality: South Korea
Medal record
Representing South Korea
World Table Tennis Championships
Silver medal – second place	1981 Novi Sad	Team
Bronze medal – third place	1981 Novi Sad	Doubles

- Korean name
- Hangul: 황남숙
- RR: Hwang Namsuk
- MR: Hwang Namsuk

Hwang Nam-sook is a female former South Korean international table tennis player.

== Table tennis career ==
She won a bronze medal in the women's doubles with An Hae-sook at the 1981 World Table Tennis Championships and a silver medal in the Corbillon Cup (women's team event) for South Korea.

== See also ==
- List of table tennis players
- List of World Table Tennis Championships medalists
