= Milan Orlowski =

Czechoslovak table tennis player

Personal information
- Nationality: Czechoslovakia
- Born: 7 September 1952 (age 73) Prague, Czechoslovakia

Sport
- Sport: Table tennis
Medal record
Men's table tennis
Representing Czechoslovakia
World Championships
Silver medal – second place	1985 Gothenburg	Doubles
European Championships
Bronze medal – third place	1986 Prague	Mixed Doubles
Silver medal – second place	1982 Budapest	Team
Bronze medal – third place	1980 Berne	Doubles
Gold medal – first place	1980 Berne	Mixed Doubles
Gold medal – first place	1978 Duisburg	Doubles
Bronze medal – third place	1976 Prague	Singles
Silver medal – second place	1976 Prague	Doubles
Silver medal – second place	1976 Prague	Mixed Doubles
Gold medal – first place	1974 Novi Sad	Singles
Silver medal – second place	1974 Novi Sad	Mixed Doubles
Bronze medal – third place	1972 Rotterdam	Doubles
Bronze medal – third place	1972 Rotterdam	Mixed Doubles

Milan Orlowski (born 7 September 1952 in Prague) is a former Czech table tennis player. He is a former representative of Czechoslovakia. vice-champion of the world, champion of Europe, meritorious master of sports and member of the Hall of Fame of Czech table tennis.

== Table tennis career ==
From 1972 to 1986, Orlowski won several medals in singles, doubles, and team events in the Table Tennis European Championships and in the World Table Tennis Championships

He won a silver medal at the 1985 World Table Tennis Championships in the men's doubles with Jindřich Panský.

He also won two English Open titles.

== See also ==
- List of table tennis players
- List of World Table Tennis Championships medalists
