= Ulf "Tickan" Carlsson =

Swedish table tennis player

Ulf Carlsson
Personal information
- Full name: Ulf Carlsson
- Nickname: Tickan
- Nationality: Sweden
- Born: 2 April 1961 (age 65) Falkenberg, Sweden

Sport
- Sport: Table tennis

Ulf "Tickan" Carlsson (born 2 April 1961) is a Swedish former table tennis player, active at international level during the 1980s. His best achievement was gold at the 1985 World Championships.

== World championships ==
Carlsson competed at all championships from 1979 to 1989. His best result was in the doubles where he won gold together with Mikael Appelgren in 1985.

== European Championships ==
He took part at all European championships between 1980 and 1988. He won the team tournament in 1980 and 1986 as part of the Swedish team. He took silver in the Double together with Mikael Appelgren in 1986.

== Other International Tournaments ==
His best places in Europe Top-12 were 4th (1986) and 6th (1987). He won the European League in 1986 as part of the Swedish team.

== Club play ==
Carlsson played with Swedish team Falkenbergs BTK until 1980, when he joined German Bundesliga team TTC Simex Jülich, with which he won the 1984 European Club Championships. He returned to Falkenberg in 1985, later he would play for its Swedish competitors, BTK Lyckeby and BTK Halmstad.

== Sources ==
- Christian Heyerdahl: Will noch hoch hinaus: Ulf Carlsson, Zeitschrift DTS, 1986/10 S.42-44
- Eintrag in ITTF-Datenbank
