= Cho Jong-hui =

North Korean table tennis player

Cho Jung-hui
Personal information
- Nationality: North Korea

Korean name
- Hangul: 조정희
- RR: Jo Jeonghui
- MR: Cho Chŏnghŭi
Medal record
Representing North Korea
World Table Tennis Championships
Bronze medal – third place	1981	Women's Team
Silver medal – second place	1985	Women's Team
Bronze medal – third place	1987	Women's Doubles

Cho Jung-hui is a former international table tennis player from North Korea.

== Table tennis career ==
She won three World Table Tennis Championship medals. She won a bronze medal at the 1981 World Table Tennis Championships in the Corbillon Cup (women's team event). Four years later she won a silver medal in the women's team and during the 1987 World Table Tennis Championships she won a bronze in the women's doubles with Ri Pun-hui.
