= Zsolt Kriston =

Hungarian table tennis player

Personal information
- Nationality: Hungary
- Born: 12 February 1961 (age 65) Miskolc
- Height: 185 cm (6 ft 1 in)

Achievements and titles
- Highest world ranking: 28 (June 1983)
Medal record
Representing Hungary
World Table Tennis Championships
Silver medal – second place	1981	Men's Team
Bronze medal – third place	1983	Men's Team

Zsolt Kriston (born 12 February 1961) is a male former international table tennis player from Hungary.

He won a silver medal at the 1981 World Table Tennis Championships in the Swaythling Cup (men's team event) with Gábor Gergely, István Jónyer, Tibor Klampár and Tibor Kreisz for Hungary. Two years later he won a bronze medal at the 1983 World Table Tennis Championships in the Swaythling Cup (men's team event) with Gergely, Jónyer, Zoltán Káposztás and János Molnár.

He also won a European Table Tennis Championships gold medal in 1982, and competed in the men's doubles event at the 1988 Summer Olympics.

== See also ==
- List of table tennis players
- List of World Table Tennis Championships medalists
