= Pu Qijuan =

Chinese table tennis player

Personal information
- Nationality: China
- Born: 1960 (age 65–66)
Medal record
Representing China
World Table Tennis Championships
Silver medal – second place	1981	Women's Doubles
Bronze medal – third place	1981	Mixed Doubles
Bronze medal – third place	1983	Women's Doubles

Pu Qijuan (born 1960) is a female Chinese former international table tennis player.

She won two medals at the 1981 World Table Tennis Championships in the women's doubles (silver medal) with Tong Ling and mixed doubles (bronze medal) with Huang Liang. Two years later she won a bronze at the 1983 World Table Tennis Championships with Tong Ling.

== See also ==
- List of table tennis players
- List of World Table Tennis Championships medalists
