= Jindřich Panský =

Czech table tennis player

Personal information
- Nationality: Czechoslovakia
- Born: 29 July 1960 (age 65) Plzeň, Czechoslovakia
Medal record
Representing Czechoslovakia
World Table Tennis Championships
Silver medal – second place	1985	Men's Doubles
Silver medal – second place	1985	Mixed Doubles

Jindřich Panský (born 29 July 1960) is a male former Czech international table tennis player.

He won two silver medals at the 1985 World Table Tennis Championships in the men's doubles with Milan Orlowski and in the mixed doubles with Marie Hrachová. He also competed in the men's singles event at the 1988 Summer Olympics.

== See also ==
- List of table tennis players
- List of World Table Tennis Championships medalists
