= Ulf Bengtsson =

Swedish table tennis player (1960–2019)

Personal information
- Nationality: Sweden
- Born: 26 January 1960 Höganäs, Sweden
- Died: 17 March 2019 (aged 59) Halmstad, Sweden

Sport
- Sport: Table tennis
Medal record
Men's table tennis
Representing Sweden
World Championships
Silver medal – second place	1983 Tokyo	Men's Team
Silver medal – second place	1985 Gothenburg	Men's Team
World Cup
Bronze medal – third place	1984 Kuala Lumpur	Singles
European Championships
Gold medal – first place	1984 Moscow	Singles
Gold medal – first place	1988 Paris	Men's Team
Bronze medal – third place	1982 Budapest	Doubles
Bronze medal – third place	1984 Moscow	Doubles

Ulf Bengtsson (26 January 1960 – 17 March 2019) was a Swedish table tennis player and coach.

From 1983 to 1988 he won several medals in singles, doubles, and team events at the European Championships, two silver medals with the Swedish team in the World Table Tennis Championships, he also achieved the third place at the Table Tennis World Cup in 1984.

== See also ==
- List of table tennis players
