= Valentina Popova (table tennis) =

Soviet-Slovak table tennis player

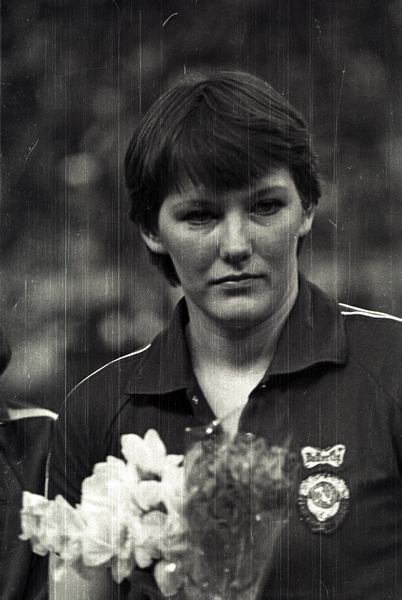

Personal information
- Nationality: Soviet Union Slovakia
- Born: 21 November 1960 (age 65) Sumgait

Sport
- Sport: Table tennis
Medal record
Women's table tennis
European Championships
Representing Soviet Union
Gold medal – first place	1976 Prague	Team
Bronze medal – third place	1978 Duisburg	Doubles
Bronze medal – third place	1978 Duisburg	Mixed Doubles
Gold medal – first place	1980 Berne	Singles
Gold medal – first place	1980 Berne	Doubles
Gold medal – first place	1980 Berne	Team
Bronze medal – third place	1982 Budapest	Singles
Bronze medal – third place	1982 Budapest	Mixed Doubles
Gold medal – first place	1984 Moscow	Singles
Gold medal – first place	1984 Moscow	Doubles
Gold medal – first place	1984 Moscow	Mixed Doubles
Gold medal – first place	1984 Moscow	Team
Silver medal – second place	1986 Prague	Team
Bronze medal – third place	1988 Paris	Singles
Gold medal – first place	1988 Paris	Team
Bronze medal – third place	1990 Gothenburg	Doubles
Representing Unified Team
Bronze medal – third place	1992 Stuttgart	Team
Representing Slovakia
Bronze medal – third place	1994 Birmingham	Mixed Doubles
Friendship Games
Bronze medal – third place	1984 Moscow	Women's doubles

Valentina Ivanovna Popova (Russian: Валентина Ивановна Попова) (born 21 November 1960 in Sumgait) is a former Soviet, and then Slovak, international table tennis player.

== Table tennis career ==
From 1976 to 1994, she won 18 medals at the Table Tennis European Championships. At the European Championships in 1984, she won all four possible gold medals (singles, team (USSR), doubles (with Narine Antonyan), and mixed doubles (with Jacques Secretin), becoming the second ever absolute European women table tennis champion (Zoja Rudnova was the first one to do that in 1970).

She is a multiple USSR National champion - six times in singles, five times in doubles, and three times in mixed doubles.

== See also ==
- List of table tennis players
