= Kim Gyong-sun =

North Korean table tennis player

Personal information
- Nationality: North Korea
Medal record
Women's table tennis
Representing North Korea
World Table Tennis Championships
Bronze medal – third place	1981	women's team
Bronze medal – third place	1983	women's team

Kim Gyong-sun is a former international table tennis player from North Korea.

== Table tennis career ==
She won two world Championship bronze medals for North Korea; one at the 1981 World Table Tennis Championships in the Corbillon Cup (women's team event) with Ri Song-suk and Pak Yung-sun and one at the 1983 World Table Tennis Championships in the Corbillon Cup (women's team event) with Ri Song-suk, Chang Yong-ok and Li Bun-hui.

She also won two Asian Games medals.

== See also ==
- List of World Table Tennis Championships medalists
