= Huang Junqun =

Chinese table tennis player

Personal information
- Nationality: China
- Born: 1962 (age 63–64)

Sport
- Sport: Table tennis
Medal record
Women's table tennis
Representing China
World Championships
| Bronze medal – third place | 1983 Tokyo | Singles |
| Silver medal – second place | 1983 Tokyo | Doubles |
| Bronze medal – third place | 1983 Tokyo | Mixed |
| Bronze medal – third place | 1981 Pyongyang | Mixed |
| Gold medal – first place | 1981 Pyongyang | Team |

Huang Junqun (Chinese: 黄俊群) is a former international table tennis player from China.

== Table tennis career ==
She won five World Championship medals. During the 1981 World Table Tennis Championships she claimed a bronze medal in the women's doubles with Yan Guili and a gold medal in the mixed doubles with Xie Saike.

Two years later at the 1983 World Table Tennis Championships she won a bronze in the singles, bronze in the mixed doubles with Xie Saike and a silver medal in the women's doubles with Geng Lijuan.

== See also ==
- List of table tennis players
- List of World Table Tennis Championships medalists
