= Marie Hrachová =

Czech table tennis player

Personal information
- Nationality: Czech Republic
- Born: 12 November 1963 (age 62) Ostrava
Medal record
Representing Czechoslovakia
World Table Tennis Championships
| Silver medal – second place | 1985 | Mixed Doubles |
Friendship Games
| Silver medal – second place | 1984 Moscow | Women's singles |
| Silver medal – second place | 1984 Moscow | Women's doubles |

Marie Hrachová (born 12 November 1963) is a female former Czech international table tennis player.

== Table tennis career ==
She won a silver medal at the 1985 World Table Tennis Championships in the mixed doubles with Jindřich Panský.

She competed in the 1988 Summer Olympics and 1992 Summer Olympics.

== See also ==
- List of table tennis players
- List of World Table Tennis Championships medalists
