= Ni Xialian =

Chinese-born Luxembourgish table tennis player

Xia Lian Ni
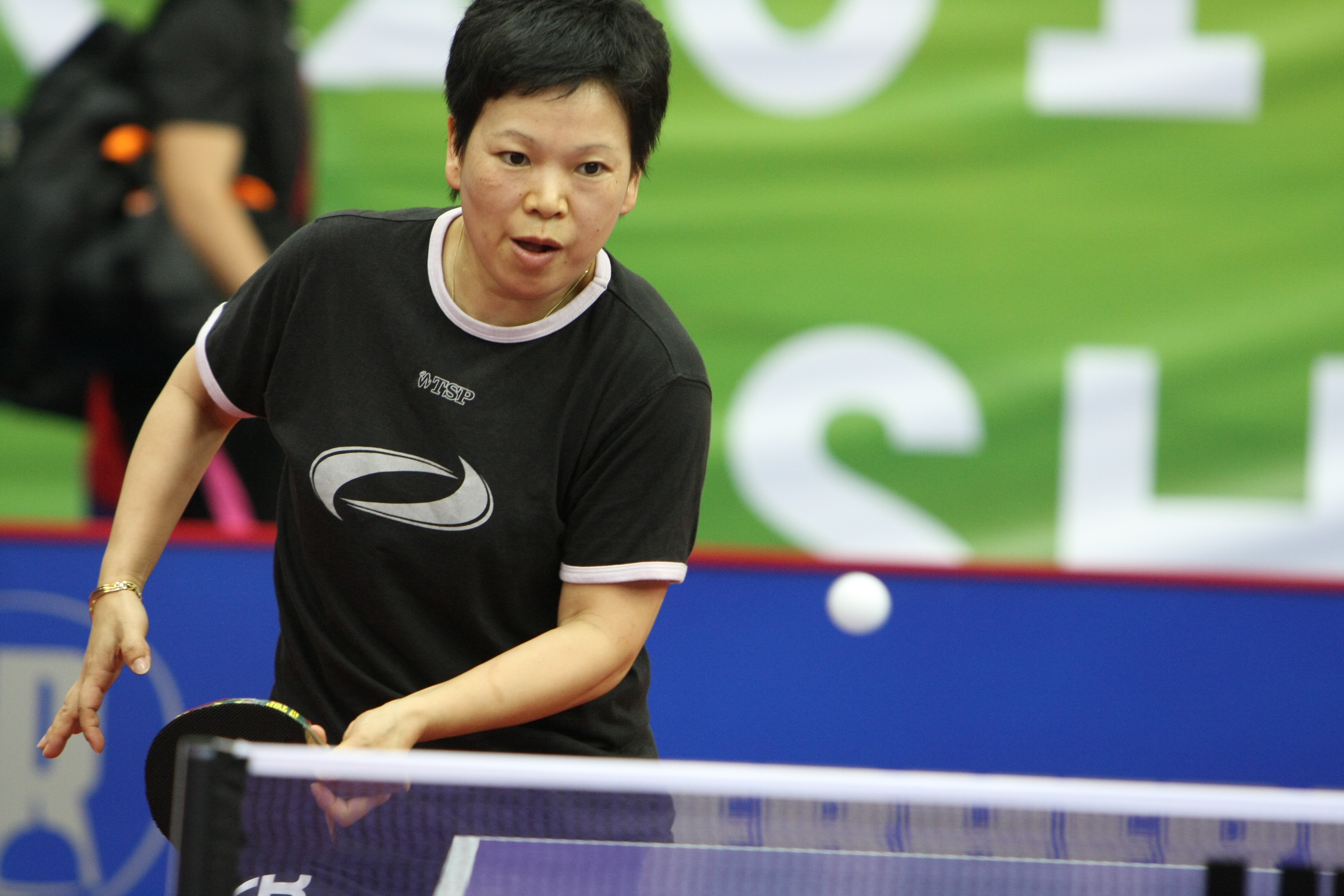
- Ni in 2010

Personal information
- Nationality: Luxembourgish
- Born: 4 July 1963 (age 63) Shanghai, China
- Height: 1.57 m (5 ft 2 in)
- Weight: 58 kg (128 lb)

Sport
- Sport: Table tennis
- Playing style: Left-handed, penhold
- Highest ranking: 6 (25 May 1985)
- Current ranking: 116 (28 September 2026)
Medal record
Women's table tennis
Representing Luxembourg
World Championships
Bronze medal – third place	2021 Houston	Doubles
European Games
Bronze medal – third place	2019 Minsk	Singles
European Championships
Gold medal – first place	1998 Eindhoven	Singles
Gold medal – first place	2002 Zagreb	Singles
Gold medal – first place	2002 Zagreb	Mixed doubles
Silver medal – second place	2000 Bremen	Doubles
Silver medal – second place	2007 Belgrade	Singles
Bronze medal – third place	2018 Alicante	Doubles
Bronze medal – third place	2022 Munich	Doubles
Games of the Small States of Europe
Gold medal – first place	2009 Cyprus	Singles
Gold medal – first place	2009 Cyprus	Doubles
Gold medal – first place	2009 Cyprus	Team
Gold medal – first place	2011 Liechtenstein	Singles
Gold medal – first place	2011 Liechtenstein	Doubles
Gold medal – first place	2011 Liechtenstein	Team
Gold medal – first place	2013 Luxembourg	Doubles
Gold medal – first place	2013 Luxembourg	Team
Gold medal – first place	2015 Iceland	Team
Representing China
World Championships
Gold medal – first place	1983 Tokyo	Team
Gold medal – first place	1983 Tokyo	Mixed doubles
Silver medal – second place	1985 Gothenburg	Doubles
Bronze medal – third place	1983 Tokyo	Doubles

Ni Xia Lian (Chinese: 倪夏連; born 4 July 1963) is a Chinese-born Luxembourgish table tennis player who has represented Luxembourg in international competitions since 1991. Born in Shanghai, China, she currently lives with her husband, Tommy Danielsson, in Ettelbruck, Luxembourg.

== Personal ==
Ni began playing table tennis at age 7, and she joined the Chinese national team when she was a teenager.

== Career ==
Ni won team and mixed doubles gold medals for China in the 1983 World Table Tennis Championships. She moved to Germany in 1989 and settled in Luxembourg two years later. Her husband, Tommy Danielsson, is her coach and training partner. She competed at the 2008 Summer Olympics, reaching the third round of the singles competition. She qualified for competition at the 2012 Summer Olympics in the Women's singles competition. She lost 4–2 to 16-year-old Ariel Hsing from the US in the 2nd round in the London games.

She competed for Luxembourg at the 2016 Summer Olympics in Rio de Janeiro in the women's singles competition. She lost 4–2 to Feng Tianwei of Singapore in the 3rd round. She was the flag bearer for Luxembourg during the closing ceremony.

When she qualified for the 2020 Summer Olympics at the age of 58, Ni became the oldest Olympian table tennis player.

During the Seamaster 2017 ITTF World Tour Hybiome Austrian Open, Ni won the longest match in table tennis history which lasted 1 hour, 32 minutes, and 44 seconds.

In 2021, Ni, 58 years old, won the women's doubles bronze medal for Luxembourg (LUX) in 2021 World Table Tennis Championships alongside Sarah de Nutte. At the age of 60, Ni was ranked the 46th worldwide.

She competed in table tennis for Luxembourg at the 2024 Summer Olympics in Paris where she was also one of the country's flag bearers during the opening ceremony. She beat Sibel Altinkaya 4-2 in the first round, but lost 4-0 to the current world No. 1 Sun Yingsha.

Ni is noted to be one of "the most beloved athletes" in Luxembourg, where she was honored twice as that country's Sportswoman of the Year.

== See also ==
- List of table tennis players
- List of World Table Tennis Championships medalists
