= Lee Soo-ja =

South Korean table tennis player

Personal information
- Nationality: South Korea
- Born: 1961 (age 64–65)
Medal record
Women's table tennis
Representing South Korea
World Table Tennis Championships
Silver medal – second place	1981 Novi Sad	Team
Bronze medal – third place	1981 Novi Sad	Singles
Bronze medal – third place	1985 Gothenburg	Team

Korean name
- Hangul: 이수자
- RR: I Suja
- MR: I Suja

Lee Soo-ja (born 1961) is a female former South Korean international table tennis player.

== Table tennis career ==
She won a bronze medal in the women's singles and a silver medal in the Corbillon Cup (women's team event) at the 1981 World Table Tennis Championships. Four years later she won another bronze in the women's team event.

== See also ==
- List of table tennis players
- List of World Table Tennis Championships medalists
