= Mikael Appelgren =

Swedish table tennis player

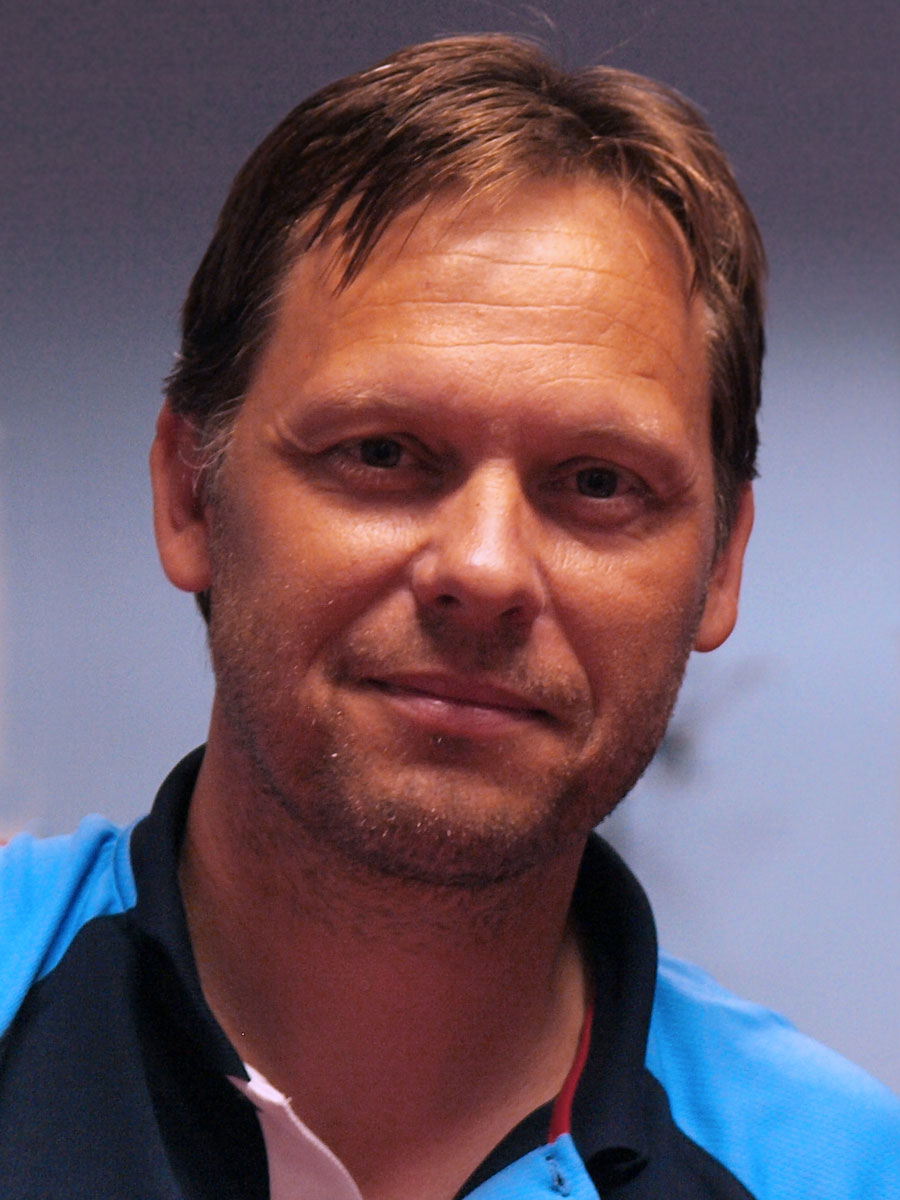
- Mikael Appelgren in 2009

Personal information
- Full name: Kent Mikael Appelgren
- Nationality: Sweden
- Born: 15 October 1961 (age 64) Stockholm, Sweden

Sport
- Sport: Table tennis
- Highest ranking: 1 (1982, 1990)
Medal record
Men's table tennis
Representing Sweden
World Championships
Gold medal – first place	1985 Gothenburg	Doubles
Gold medal – first place	1989 Dortmund	Men's Team
Gold medal – first place	1991 Chiba City	Men's Team
Gold medal – first place	1993 Gothenburg	Men's Team
Silver medal – second place	1983 Tokyo	Men's Team
Silver medal – second place	1985 Gothenburg	Men's Team
Silver medal – second place	1987 New Delhi	Men's Team
Silver medal – second place	1995 Tianjin	Men's Team
World Cup
Gold medal – first place	1983 Barbados	Singles
Gold medal – first place	1990 Ciba city	Men's Team
Silver medal – second place	1982 Hong Kong	Singles
Silver medal – second place	1994 Nimes	Men's Team
Bronze medal – third place	1989 Nairobi	Singles
European Championships
Gold medal – first place	1980 Berne	Men's Team
Gold medal – first place	1982 Budapest	Singles
Gold medal – first place	1986 Prague	Men's Team
Gold medal – first place	1988 Paris	Singles
Gold medal – first place	1988 Paris	Doubles
Gold medal – first place	1988 Paris	Men's Team
Gold medal – first place	1990 Gothenburg	Singles
Gold medal – first place	1990 Gothenburg	Men's Team
Gold medal – first place	1992 Stuttgart	Men's Team
Silver medal – second place	1986 Prague	Doubles
Silver medal – second place	1992 Stuttgart	Doubles

Kent Mikael Appelgren (born 15 October 1961) is a Swedish former table tennis player.

== Table tennis career ==
He was 4-times World Champion, 9-times European Champion, 2-times Europe Top-12 winner, and World Cup winner. He also won an English Open title.

He is left-handed and is known for his ability to play well far away from the table. This particular style became known over the years as 'appleing'.

Applegren coaches Swedish first league team Ängby/Spårvägen and was present when Jan-Ove Waldner ended his career on 11 February 2016.

== Career ==
- Wermlandsföreningen (??-1974)
- Stockholms Spårvägars GoIF (1974–1980)
- Reutlingen, Germany (1980–1986)
- Ängby SK (1986–1996)
- Bad Honnef, Germany (1996–1997)
- TTK Würzburger Hofbräu, Germany (1997–1998, 1998–1999)
- Ängby SK (1999–2008)
- Stockholms Spårvägars GoIF (2008-??)

== See also ==
- List of table tennis players
- List of World Table Tennis Championships medalists
