= Qi Baoxiang =

Chinese table tennis player

Personal information
- Nationality: China
- Born: 1961 (age 64–65)

Sport
- Sport: Table tennis
Medal record
Women's table tennis
Representing China
World Championships
Bronze medal – third place	1985 Gothenburg	Singles
Bronze medal – third place	1985 Gothenburg	Doubles
Bronze medal – third place	1983 Tokyo	Singles
Gold medal – first place	1981 Novi Sad	Team
Asian Championships
Gold medal – first place	1980 Calcutta	Singles
Bronze medal – third place	1980 Calcutta	Doubles
Bronze medal – third place	1980 Calcutta	Mixed Doubles
Gold medal – first place	1980 Calcutta	Team

Qi Baoxiang is a female former international table tennis player from China.

== Table tennis career ==
From 1981 to 1985 she won several medals in singles, doubles, and team events in the Asian Table Tennis Championships and four medals in the World Table Tennis Championships.

The four World Championship medals included a gold medal in the Corbillon Cup (team event) at the 1981 World Table Tennis Championships for China.

== Personal life ==
She is the sister of Chai Po Wa (pronounced Qi Baohua in Mandarin), also a table tennis player.

== See also ==
- List of table tennis players
- List of World Table Tennis Championships medalists
