= Xie Saike =

Chinese table tennis player

Personal information
- Full name: XIE Saike
- Nationality: China
- Born: 31 August 1961 (age 64)

Sport
- Sport: Table tennis
Medal record
Men's Table tennis
Representing China
Asian Games
Gold medal – first place	1982 New Delhi	Singles
Gold medal – first place	1982 New Delhi	Double (Mixed)
World Championships
Gold medal – first place	1981 Novi Sad	Team (Men)
Gold medal – first place	1981 Novi Sad	Doubles (Mixed)
Gold medal – first place	1983 Tokyo	Team (Men)
Gold medal – first place	1985 Gothenburg	Team (Men)
Silver medal – second place	1981 Novi Sad	Doubles (Men)
Silver medal – second place	1983 Tokyo	Doubles (Men)
Bronze medal – third place	1983 Tokyo	Doubles (Mixed)

Xie Saike (born 31 August 1961) is a male former table tennis player from China. He was the 1981 World Champion in mixed doubles.

== Career ==
Xie won the 1982 Asian Games singles title in New Delhi, India.

Xie was twice runner-up at these Championships in 1982 (Jakarta) and 1980 (Calcutta, now Kolkata). He finally won gold in three categories (single, doubles (men and mixed)) at the 1984 Asian Table Tennis Championships held in Islamabad, Pakistan.

Xie was twice runner-up in doubles (men) at the 1981 World Championships in Novi Sad and 1983 World Championships in Tokyo.

He was the runner-up at the World Cup held in Kuala Lumpur, Malaysia in 1981.

== Beijing Olympics ==
Xie was one of the torch runners in Nanning for the 2008 Summer Olympics in Beijing.
