= Cai Zhenhua =

Chinese table tennis player

Personal information
- Full name: Cai Zhenhua
- Nationality: China
- Born: 3 September 1961 (age 64) Wuxi, Jiangsu, China
- Height: 1.76 m (5 ft 9 in)

Sport
- Sport: Table tennis
Medal record
Men's table tennis
Representing China
World Championships
Bronze medal – third place	1985 Gothenburg	Doubles
Gold medal – first place	1985 Gothenburg	Mixed Doubles
Silver medal – second place	1983 Tokyo	Singles
Bronze medal – third place	1983 Tokyo	Mixed Doubles
Gold medal – first place	1983 Tokyo	Men's Team
Silver medal – second place	1981 Novi Sad	Singles
Gold medal – first place	1981 Novi Sad	Doubles
Gold medal – first place	1981 Novi Sad	Men's Team
Asian Championships
Gold medal – first place	1982 Jakarta	Singles
Silver medal – second place	1982 Jakarta	Doubles
Bronze medal – third place	1982 Jakarta	Mixed Doubles
Gold medal – first place	1982 Jakarta	Men's Team
Silver medal – second place	1980 Calcutta	Doubles
Bronze medal – third place	1980 Calcutta	Mixed Doubles
Gold medal – first place	1980 Calcutta	Men's Team

Cai Zhenhua
- Simplified Chinese: 蔡振华
- Traditional Chinese: 蔡振華
Transcriptions
Standard Mandarin
- Hanyu Pinyin: Cài Zhènhuá
- IPA: [tsʰâɪ ʈʂə̂n xwǎ]

Cai Zhenhua (Chinese: 蔡振华; pinyin: Cài Zhènhuá; Mandarin pronunciation: [tsʰâɪ ʈʂə̂n xwǎ]; born 3 September 1961 in Wuxi, Jiangsu) is a former table tennis player from China. He is the vice Chairman and the Secretary of the Secretariat of the All-China Federation of Trade Unions, the former deputy Director of State General Administration of Sports, and was the president of the Chinese Football Association from 2014 to 2019 and was replaced by Chen Xuyuan, the Chinese Badminton Association and the Chinese Table Tennis Association.

== Career ==
From 1980 to 1985 he won several medals in singles, doubles, and team events in the Asian Table Tennis Championships and in the World Table Tennis Championships.

He worked as the lead coach of the Chinese men's team from 1991 to 2004, playing an important role in leading the Chinese team to its comeback.

In April 2007, Cai became the deputy Director of State General Administration of Sports. He was elected as the president of the Chinese Badminton Association on 18 February 2009 and the president of the Chinese Table Tennis Association on 27 February 2009. On 21 January 2014, he was elected as the president of the Chinese Football Association.

In September 2018, Cai was appointed as the vice Chairman and the Secretary of the Secretariat of the All-China Federation of Trade Unions.
