= Tong Ling =

Chinese table tennis player

Personal information
- Full name: TONG Ling
- Nationality: China
- Born: 13 July 1962 (age 64)

Sport
- Sport: Table tennis
Medal record
Women's table tennis
Representing China
World Championships
Bronze medal – third place	1985 Gothenburg	Doubles
Bronze medal – third place	1985 Gothenburg	Mixed Doubles
Gold medal – first place	1985 Gothenburg	Team
Bronze medal – third place	1983 Tokyo	Doubles
Silver medal – second place	1983 Tokyo	Mixed Doubles
Gold medal – first place	1983 Tokyo	Team
Gold medal – first place	1981 Novi Sad	Singles
Silver medal – second place	1981 Novi Sad	Doubles
Silver medal – second place	1981 Novi Sad	Mixed Doubles
Gold medal – first place	1981 Novi Sad	Team
Bronze medal – third place	1979 Pyongyang	Singles
Asian Championships
Silver medal – second place	1982 Jakarta	Singles
Silver medal – second place	1982 Jakarta	Doubles
Gold medal – first place	1982 Jakarta	Mixed Doubles
Gold medal – first place	1982 Jakarta	Team
Bronze medal – third place	1980 Calcutta	Singles
Bronze medal – third place	1980 Calcutta	Doubles
Gold medal – first place	1980 Calcutta	Team

Tong Ling (童玲) is a female former international table tennis player from China.

== Table tennis career ==
From 1980 to 1985 she won many medals in singles, doubles, and team events in the Asian Table Tennis Championships and the World Table Tennis Championships.

The eleven World Championship medals included four gold medals; one in the singles at the 1981 World Table Tennis Championships and three in the team event.

== See also ==
- List of table tennis players
- List of World Table Tennis Championships medalists
