= 1967 World Table Tennis Championships – Men's doubles =

1967 Men's doubles

The 1967 World Table Tennis Championships men's doubles was the 29th edition of the men's doubles championship. Hans Alsér and Kjell Johansson won the title after defeating Anatoly Amelin and Stanislav Gomozkov in the final by three sets to two.

== Results ==
Round of 16
(North Korea) Pak Sin Il (North Korea) Kim Chang-Ho	21	17	22	15	21
(England) Chester Barnes (England) Denis Neale	13	21	20	21	23
(Romania) Radu Negulescu (Romania) Adalbert Rethi	15	21	15	17
(Soviet Union) Anatoly Amelin (Soviet Union) Stanislav Gomozkov	21	17	21	21
(Japan) Hajime Kagimoto (Japan) Satoru Kawahara	17	18	23
(Socialist Federal Republic of Yugoslavia) Istvan Korpa (Socialist Federal Republic of Yugoslavia) Edvard Vecko	21	21	25
(Soviet Union) Sarkis Sarchayan (Soviet Union) David Brodski	21	21	18	10
(Czechoslovakia) Vladimir Miko (Czechoslovakia) Jaroslav Staněk	23	19	21	21
(Sweden) Hans Alsér (Sweden) Kjell Johansson	21	21	21
(Cambodia) Yang Chhor Nam (Cambodia) Tan Serey	3	16	14
(North Korea) Jun Duk Chi (North Korea) Jung Ryang-Woong	21	21	21
(Denmark) Niels Ramberg (Denmark) Brian Petersen	15	13	12
(East Germany) Siegfried Lemke (East Germany) Wolfgang Vater	21	21	17	21
(Republic of Ireland) Jim Langan (Republic of Ireland) Tommy Caffrey	17	12	21	11
(Japan) Nobuhiko Hasegawa (Japan) Mitsuru Kono	21	21	21
(North Korea) Kim Jung-Sam (North Korea) Kang Neung-Hwa	15	14	19

Quarterfinals
(England) Barnes (England) Neale	15	17	17
(Soviet Union) Amelin (Soviet Union) Gomozkov	21	21	21
(Socialist Federal Republic of Yugoslavia) Korpa (Socialist Federal Republic of Yugoslavia) Vecko	21	17	19	16
(Czechoslovakia) Miko (Czechoslovakia) Stanek	16	21	21	21
(Sweden) Alsér (Sweden) Johansson	21	21	12	19	21
(North Korea) Jun Duk Chi (North Korea) Jung Ryang Woong	18	10	21	21	16
(East Germany) Lemke (East Germany) Vater	10	16	22
(Japan) Hasegawa (Japan) Kono	21	21	24

Semifinals
(Soviet Union) Amelin (Soviet Union) Gomozkov	20	21	21	18	22
(Czechoslovakia) Miko (Czechoslovakia) Stanek	22	19	19	21	20
(Sweden) Alsér (Sweden) Johansson	21	21	17	21
(Japan) Hasegawa (Japan) Kono	17	15	21	19

Final
(Soviet Union) Amelin (Soviet Union) Gomozkov	16	21	13	21	20
(Sweden) Alsér (Sweden) Johansson	21	19	21	12	22

== See also ==
List of World Table Tennis Championships medalists
