= German Open (table tennis) =

Tournament information
- Event name: German Open
- Tour: ITTF World Tour
- Founded: 1925
- Location: Bremen (2018)
- Venue: ÖVB Arena (2018)
- Category: World Tour Platinum
- Draw: 32S / 16D
- Prize money: US$235,000 (2018)

The German Open is an annual table tennis tournament in Germany, run by the International Table Tennis Federation (ITTF). It is currently part of the ITTF World Tour.

== History ==
The tournament was first held in 1925, and has featured on the ITTF World Tour's schedule in 1999, and then every year since 2001.

China's Ma Long holds the record for most men's singles tournament wins, with five, while in the women's singles event, Mária Mednyánszky, Astrid Krebsbach, Trude Pritzi, Agnes Simon and Maria Alexandru all share the record with three wins each. Since the tournament became part of the ITTF World Tour in 1999, Chen Meng is the only player wins the women's singles event more than once.

In August 2016, it was announced by the ITTF that Magdeburg has been chosen as one of six cities to host a "World Tour Platinum" event in 2017. These events will replace the Super Series as the top tier of the ITTF World Tour. The German Table Tennis Association has confirmed that the "German Open" name will continue to be used.

== Champions ==
=== Individual Events ===
==== 1925–1988 ====
Year	Men's singles	Women's singles	Men's doubles	Women's doubles	Mixed doubles
1925	(India) Prashant N. Nanda	(Weimar Republic) Richter-Schwerdtfeger			
1926	(Kingdom of Hungary) Zoltán Mechlovits	(Austria) Josephine Wiesenthal			
1927	(Kingdom of Hungary) Sándor Glancz	(Weimar Republic) Erika Metzger	(Kingdom of Hungary) Béla von Kehrling (Kingdom of Hungary) Zoltán Mechlovits	(Austria) Josephine Wiesenthal (Austria) Gertrude Wildhamn	(Kingdom of Hungary) Laszlo Bellak (Weimar Republic) Mona Rüster
1928	(Austria) Alfred Liebster	(Kingdom of Hungary) Mária Mednyánszky	(Kingdom of Hungary) Laszlo Bellak (Kingdom of Hungary) Sándor Glancz		(Kingdom of Hungary) Daniel Pecsi (Weimar Republic) Erika Metzger
1929	(Czechoslovakia) Antonin Malecek	(Weimar Republic) Ingeborg Carnatz	(Latvia) Mordecai Finberg (Latvia) Arnold Oschin		(Sweden) Valter Kolomodin (Weimar Republic) Ingeborg Carnatz
1930	(Kingdom of Hungary) Viktor Barna	(Kingdom of Hungary) Mária Mednyánszky	(Kingdom of Hungary) Lajos Dávid (Kingdom of Hungary) István Kelen		(Kingdom of Hungary) Miklós Szabados (Kingdom of Hungary) Mária Mednyánszky
1931	(Kingdom of Hungary) Viktor Barna	(Kingdom of Hungary) Magda Gál	(Kingdom of Hungary) Viktor Barna (Kingdom of Hungary) Miklós Szabados		(Kingdom of Hungary) Viktor Barna (Kingdom of Hungary) Magda Gál
1932	(Kingdom of Hungary) Viktor Barna	(Kingdom of Hungary) Mária Mednyánszky	(Kingdom of Hungary) Viktor Barna (Kingdom of Hungary) Miklós Szabados	(Kingdom of Hungary) Lefeld (Kingdom of Hungary) Mária Mednyánszky	(Kingdom of Hungary) Miklós Szabados (Kingdom of Hungary) Mária Mednyánszky
1933	(Latvia) Mordecai Finberg	(Nazi Germany) Astrid Krebsbach	(Austria) Manfred Feher (Austria) Alfred Liebster		(England) David Jones (Nazi Germany) Astrid Krebsbach
1935	(Czechoslovakia) Miloslav Hamr	(Nazi Germany) Astrid Krebsbach	(Czechoslovakia) Stanislav Kolář (Czechoslovakia) Karel Svoboda	(Czechoslovakia) Marie Kettnerová (Czechoslovakia) Marie Šmídová	(Czechoslovakia) Miloslav Hamr (Czechoslovakia) Gertrude Kleinová
1936	(Czechoslovakia) Stanislav Kolář	(Nazi Germany) Astrid Krebsbach	(Kingdom of Hungary) István Boros (Kingdom of Hungary) Tibor Házi	(Nazi Germany) Hilde Bussmann (Nazi Germany) Astrid Krebsbach	(Czechoslovakia) Stanislav Kolář (Nazi Germany) Hilde Bussmann
1937	(Czechoslovakia) Bohumil Váňa	(Austria) Gertrude Pritzi	(Nazi Germany) Götz Meschede (Czechoslovakia) Bohumil Váňa	(Nazi Germany) Hilde Bussmann (Nazi Germany) Astrid Krebsbach	(Czechoslovakia) Bohumil Váňa (Czechoslovakia) Věra Votrubcová
1938	(Czechoslovakia) Miloslav Hamr	(Nazi Germany) Gertrude Pritzi	(Czechoslovakia) Miloslav Hamr (Czechoslovakia) Bohumil Váňa	(Czechoslovakia) Vlasta Depetrisová (Czechoslovakia) Věra Votrubcová	(Czechoslovakia) Bohumil Váňa (Czechoslovakia) Věra Votrubcová
1939	(Czechoslovakia) Miloslav Hamr	(Nazi Germany) Gertrude Pritzi	(Czechoslovakia) Ivan Andreadis (Czechoslovakia) Miloslav Hamr	(Nazi Germany) Hilde Bussmann (Nazi Germany) Gertrude Pritzi	(Czechoslovakia) Miloslav Hamr (Czechoslovakia) Marie Kettnerová
1954	(Socialist Federal Republic of Yugoslavia) Vilim Harangozo	(Japan) Fujie Eguchi	(Socialist Federal Republic of Yugoslavia) Vilim Harangozo (Socialist Federal Republic of Yugoslavia) Josip Vogrinc	(Japan) Fujie Eguchi (Japan) Kiiko Watanabe	(Japan) Ichiro Ogimura (Japan) Kiiko Watanabe
1955	(France) Alojzy Ehrlich	(Scotland) Helen Elliot	(United States) Bernhard Bukiet (United States) Erwin Klein	(West Germany) Ursula Paulsen (West Germany) Annegret Thöle	(Socialist Federal Republic of Yugoslavia) Josip Vogrinc (Scotland) Helen Elliot
1960	(Sweden) Tony Larsson	(Netherlands) Agnes Simon	(Socialist Federal Republic of Yugoslavia) Vilim Harangozo (Socialist Federal Republic of Yugoslavia) Josip Vogrinc	(England) Diane Rowe (England) Kathleen Best	(Netherlands) Bert Onnes (Netherlands) Agnes Simon
1961	(Sweden) Hans Alsér	(Netherlands) Agnes Simon	(Sweden) Hans Alsér (Sweden) Tony Larsson	(West Germany) Heide Dauphin (West Germany) Rosemarie Seidel	(Sweden) Tony Larsson (Sweden) Lena Guntsch
1962	(West Germany) Eberhard Schöler	(West Germany) Agnes Simon	(Socialist Federal Republic of Yugoslavia) Vojislav Markovic (Socialist Federal Republic of Yugoslavia) Janez Teran	(West Germany) Inge Harst-Muser (West Germany) Agnes Simon	(West Germany) Eberhard Schöler (West Germany) Agnes Simon
1963	(West Germany) Eberhard Schöler	(Romania) Maria Alexandru	(Socialist Federal Republic of Yugoslavia) Istvan Korpa (Socialist Federal Republic of Yugoslavia) Josip Vogrinc	(Romania) Maria Alexandru (Romania) Georgita Pitica	(Hungary) Zoltán Berczik (Hungary) Erzsebet Heirits
1964	(West Germany) Eberhard Schöler	(Romania) Maria Alexandru	(Socialist Federal Republic of Yugoslavia) Istvan Korpa (Socialist Federal Republic of Yugoslavia) Edvard Vecko	(Romania) Maria Alexandru (Romania) Ella Zeller	(Romania) Dorin Giurgiuca (Romania) Ella Zeller
1965	(Romania) Dorin Giurgiuca	(England) Mary Shannon	(West Germany) Ernst Gomolla (West Germany) Eberhard Schöler	(England) Diane Rowe (England) Mary Shannon	(Czechoslovakia) Vladimir Miko (Czechoslovakia) Marta Luzova
1966	(Czechoslovakia) Jaroslav Stanek	(Romania) Maria Alexandru	(Czechoslovakia) Vladimir Miko (Czechoslovakia) Jaroslav Stanek	(West Germany) Diane Schöler (England) Mary Shannon	(Romania) Dorin Giurgiuca (Romania) Maria Alexandru
1968	(Socialist Federal Republic of Yugoslavia) Istvan Korpa	(Czechoslovakia) Marta Luzova	(Czechoslovakia) Vladimir Miko (Czechoslovakia) Jaroslav Stanek	(Czechoslovakia) Jitka Karlikova (Czechoslovakia) Marta Luzova	(Czechoslovakia) Vladimir Miko (Czechoslovakia) Marta Luzova
1970	(West Germany) Eberhard Schöler	(Soviet Union) Zoja Rudnova	(Sweden) Hans Alsér (Sweden) Kjell Johansson	(Soviet Union) Svetlana Grinberg (Soviet Union) Zoja Rudnova	(Soviet Union) Stanislav Gomozkov (Soviet Union) Zoja Rudnova
1972	(Sweden) Kjell Johansson	(Soviet Union) Zoja Rudnova	(Sweden) Stellan Bengtsson (Sweden) Kjell Johansson	(Romania) Maria Alexandru (Romania) Carmen Crișan	(France) Jacques Secrétin (France) Claude Bergeret
1974	(Sweden) Kjell Johansson	(South Korea) Chung Hyun-sook	(Socialist Federal Republic of Yugoslavia) Antun Stipančić (Socialist Federal Republic of Yugoslavia) Dragutin Šurbek	(Romania) Maria Alexandru (Japan) Miho Hamada	(France) Jacques Secrétin (France) Claude Bergeret
1976	(Sweden) Kjell Johansson	(South Korea) Lee Ailesa	(France) Patrick Birocheau (France) Jacques Secrétin	(China) Yang Ying (China) Zhang Li	(France) Jacques Secrétin (France) Claude Bergeret
1980	(China) Shi Zhihao	(China) Cao Yanhua	(France) Patrick Birocheau (France) Jacques Secrétin	(China) Cao Yanhua (China) Zhang Deying	(China) Li Zhenshi (China) Zhang Deying
1982	(Czechoslovakia) Josef Dvoracek	(South Korea) An Hae-sook	(England) Paul Day (England) Desmond Douglas	(South Korea) An Hae-sook (South Korea) Hwang Nam-sook	(Czechoslovakia) Jindrich Pansky (Czechoslovakia) Marie Hrachova
1984	(Poland) Andrzej Grubba	(Hungary) Zsuzsa Oláh	(Sweden) Mikael Appelgren (Sweden) Ulf Carlsson	(Soviet Union) Fliura Abbate-Bulatova (Soviet Union) Anita Zakharjan	(Hungary) János Molnár (Hungary) Zsuzsa Oláh
1986	(Sweden) Jan-Ove Waldner	(Soviet Union) Fliura Abbate-Bulatova	(Sweden) Ulf Carlsson (Sweden) Jörgen Persson	(Romania) Olga Nemes (West Germany) Katja Nolten	(Socialist Federal Republic of Yugoslavia) Zoran Kalinić (Bulgaria) Daniela Guergueltcheva
1988	(Poland) Andrzej Grubba	(Bulgaria) Daniela Guergueltcheva	(West Germany) Steffen Fetzner (West Germany) Jörg Roßkopf	(Romania) Olga Nemes (West Germany) Katja Nolten	(Socialist Federal Republic of Yugoslavia) Zoran Kalinić (Bulgaria) Daniela Guergueltcheva

==== 1990–2018 ====
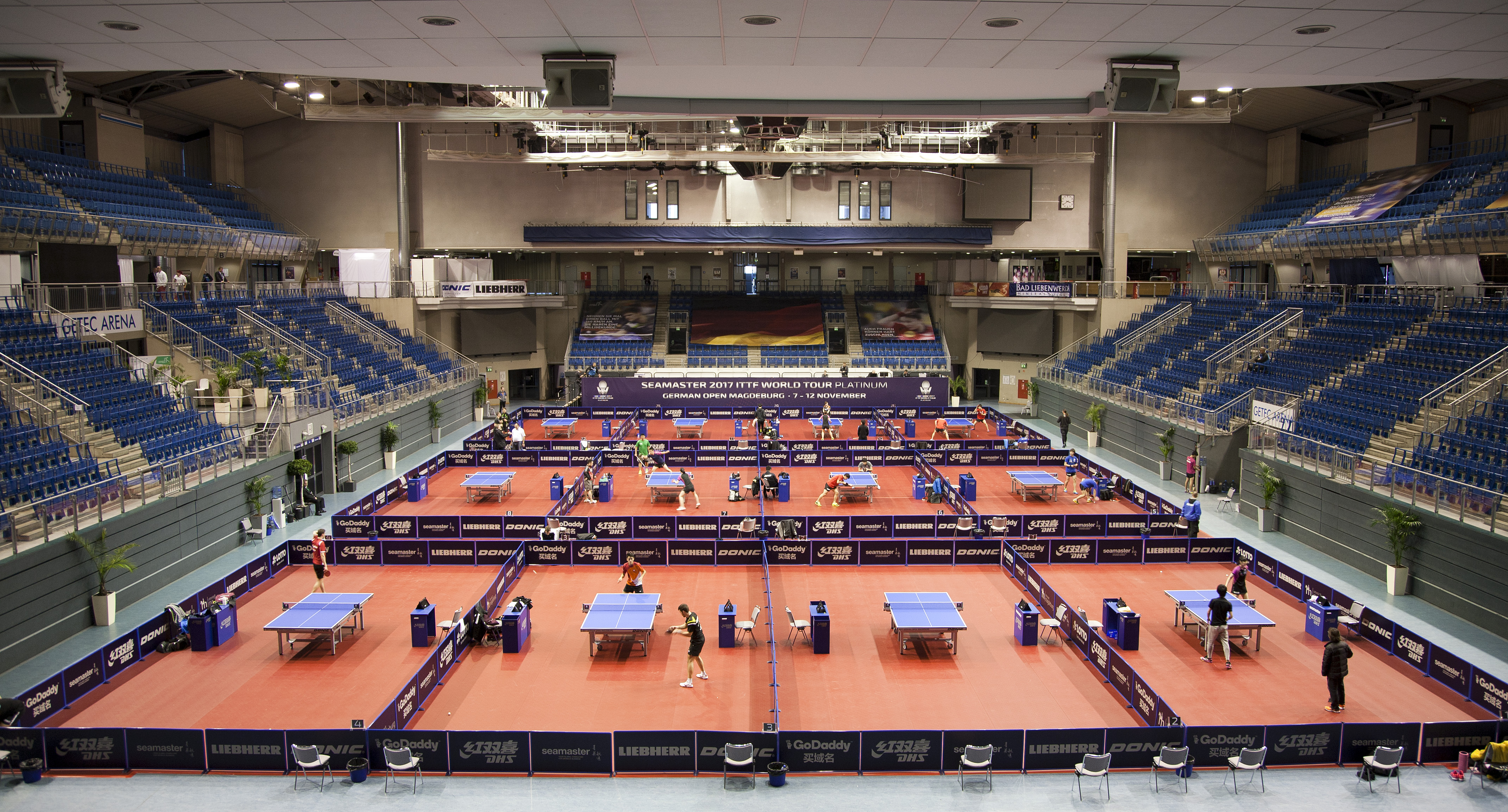
ITTF World Tour 2017 German Open, Magdeburg, GETEC Arena

Year	Men's singles	Women's singles	Men's doubles	Women's doubles
1990	(France) Jean-Philippe Gatien	(Canada) Geng Lijuan	(West Germany) Steffen Fetzner (West Germany) Jörg Roßkopf	(Hungary) Csilla Bátorfi (Hungary) Gabriella Wirth
1999	(China) Liu Guoliang	(China) Wang Nan	(Chinese Taipei) Chang Yen-shu (Chinese Taipei) Chiang Peng-lung	(Hungary) Csilla Bátorfi (Hungary) Krisztina Tóth
2001	(Belarus) Vladimir Samsonov	(South Korea) Ryu Ji-hae	(Federal Republic of Yugoslavia) Slobodan Grujić (Federal Republic of Yugoslavia) Aleksandar Karakašević	(South Korea) Kim Bok-rae (South Korea) Kim Kyung-ah
2002	(China) Ma Lin	(Croatia) Tamara Boroš	(China) Kong Linghui (China) Ma Lin	(China) Li Jia (China) Niu Jianfeng
2003	(China) Wang Liqin	(China) Zhang Yining	(Hong Kong) Ko Lai Chak (Hong Kong) Li Ching	(China) Wang Nan (China) Zhang Yining
2004	(Germany) Timo Boll	(China) Niu Jianfeng	(Germany) Timo Boll (Germany) Christian Süß	(China) Guo Yue (China) Niu Jianfeng
2005	(Belarus) Vladimir Samsonov	(China) Cao Zhen	(South Korea) Lee Jung-woo (South Korea) Oh Sang-eun	(Hong Kong) Tie Ya Na (Hong Kong) Zhang Rui
2006	(Germany) Timo Boll	(Singapore) Wang Yuegu	(France) Patrick Chila (Austria) Werner Schlager	(Singapore) Li Jiawei (Singapore) Sun Beibei
2007	(China) Ma Long	(China) Li Xiaoxia	(China) Wang Hao (China) Wang Liqin	(China) Guo Yue (China) Li Xiaoxia
2008	(Germany) Timo Boll	(Austria) Liu Jia		
2009	(Germany) Timo Boll	(Japan) Sayaka Hirano	(Germany) Timo Boll (Germany) Christian Süß	(China) Li Xiaodan (China) Mu Zi
2010	(China) Ma Long	(China) Feng Yalan	(China) Chen Qi (China) Ma Long	(Japan) Ai Fukuhara (Japan) Kasumi Ishikawa
2011	(China) Zhang Jike	(China) Guo Yan	(China) Hao Shuai (China) Zhang Jike	(China) Guo Yue (China) Li Xiaoxia
2012	(Germany) Dimitrij Ovtcharov	(Spain) Shen Yanfei	(Hong Kong) Jiang Tianyi (Hong Kong) Wong Chun Ting	(Germany) Petrissa Solja (Germany) Sabine Winter
2013	(China) Fan Zhendong	(China) Wen Jia	(Germany) Timo Boll (Germany) Patrick Franziska	(China) Wen Jia (China) Zhao Yan
2014	(Germany) Dimitrij Ovtcharov	(Germany) Shan Xiaona	(China) Lyu Xiang (China) Wang Hao	(Japan) Miu Hirano (Japan) Mima Ito
2015	(China) Ma Long	(Japan) Mima Ito	(Germany) Timo Boll (Germany) Patrick Franziska	(Germany) Shan Xiaona (Germany) Petrissa Solja
2016	(China) Ma Long	(China) Wu Yang	(Japan) Masataka Morizono (Japan) Yuya Oshima	(South Korea) Jeon Ji-hee (South Korea) Yang Ha-eun
2017	(Germany) Dimitrij Ovtcharov	(China) Chen Meng	(South Korea) Jung Young-sik (South Korea) Lee Sang-su	(Japan) Hina Hayata (Japan) Miu Hirano
2018	(China) Ma Long	(Japan) Kasumi Ishikawa	(China) Ma Long (China) Xu Xin	(Japan) Hina Hayata (Japan) Mima Ito

==== 2019–present ====
Year	Men's singles	Women's singles	Men's doubles	Women's doubles	Mixed doubles
2019	(China) Fan Zhendong	(China) Sun Yingsha	(China) Liang Jingkun (China) Xu Xin	(South Korea) Jeon Ji-hee (South Korea) Yang Ha-eun	(China) Xu Xin (China) Sun Yingsha
2020	(China) Xu Xin	(China) Chen Meng	(South Korea) Cho Dae-seong (South Korea) Jang Woo-jin	(China) Chen Meng (China) Wang Manyu	(China) Xu Xin (China) Liu Shiwen

=== Team Events ===
Year	Men's Team	Women's Team
1972	Sweden	Hungary
1974	Hungary	South Korea
1976	Sweden	China
1980	China Second Team	China First Team
1982	(Socialist Federal Republic of Yugoslavia) Yugoslavia	South Korea
1984	Sweden	(Socialist Federal Republic of Yugoslavia) Yugoslavia
1986	Poland	West Germany First Team
1988	Poland	Czechoslovakia
1990	Belgium	Hungary
2008	Poland	Singapore

== See also ==
- European Table Tennis Union
