= 1967 World Table Tennis Championships – Men's team =

1967 Swaythling Cup (men's team)

The 1967 World Table Tennis Championships – Swaythling Cup (men's team) was the 29th edition of the men's team championship.

Japan won the gold medal defeating North Korea 5–3 in the final. Sweden won the bronze medal after winning third place play off.

The Chinese team were unable to defend their title because of the Cultural Revolution.

== Medalists ==
=== Team ===
Event	Gold	Silver	Bronze
	Japan; Nobuhiko Hasegawa; Hajime Kagimoto; Satoru Kawahara; Koji Kimura; Mitsuru Kono	North Korea; Jung Ryang-Woong; Kang Neung-Hwa; Kim Chang-Ho; Kim Jung-Sam; Pak Sin Il	Sweden; Hans Alsér; Carl-Johan Bernhardt; Christer Johansson; Kjell Johansson; Bo Persson

== Semifinal round ==
=== Group 1 ===
Pos	Team	P	W	L	Pts
1	North Korea	3	3	0	6
2	Sweden	3	2	1	4
3	Czechoslovakia	3	1	2	2
4	England	3	0	3	0

=== Group 2 ===
Pos	Team	P	W	L	Pts
1	Japan	3	3	0	6
2	West Germany	3	2	1	4
3	Soviet Union	3	1	2	2
4	(Socialist Federal Republic of Yugoslavia) Yugoslavia	3	0	3	0

== Third-place playoff ==
Team One	Team Two	Score
Sweden	West Germany	5–2

== Final ==
Japan 5		North Korea 3	Score
Kono	lost to	Kim Chang-Ho	20–22 10–21
Hasegawa	bt	Jung Ryang-Woong	21–16 20–22 21–16
Kagimoto	bt	Pak Sin Il	21–19 21–15
Hasegawa	lost to	Kim Chang-Ho	21–18 18–21 14–21
Kono	bt	Pak Sin Il	21–17 21–7
Kagimoto	lost to	Jung Ryang-Woong	18–21 16–21
Hasegawa	bt	Pak Sin Il	21–16 21–16
Kagimoto	bt	Kim Chang-Ho	21–18 21–18

== See also ==
List of World Table Tennis Championships medalists
