= 1967 World Table Tennis Championships =

1967 edition of the World Table Tennis Championships

The 1967 World Table Tennis Championships were held at the Johanneshovs Isstadion in Stockholm from April 11 to April 21, 1967.

During the Cultural Revolution, Chinese sports professionals were denounced as 'Sprouts of Revisionism' and were denied places at the 1967 World Table Tennis Championships and 1969 World Table Tennis Championships. Players such as Jung Kuo-tuan were persecuted and he committed suicide in 1968. Had China competed in those championships and not lost the impetus gained in the previous decade they would surely have continued to dominate the World Championships.

== Medalists ==
=== Team ===
Event	Gold	Silver	Bronze
Swaythling Cup; Men's Team	Japan; Nobuhiko Hasegawa; Hajime Kagimoto; Satoru Kawahara; Koji Kimura; Mitsuru Kono	North Korea; Jung Ryang-Woong; Kang Neung-Hwa; Kim Chang-Ho; Kim Jung-Sam; Pak Sin Il	Sweden; Hans Alsér; Carl-Johan Bernhardt; Christer Johansson; Kjell Johansson; Bo Persson
Corbillon Cup; Women's team	Japan; Naoko Fukatsu; Saeko Hirota; Sachiko Morisawa; Noriko Yamanaka	Soviet Union; Laima Balaišytė; Svetlana Grinberg; Signe Paisjärv; Zoja Rudnova	Hungary; Erzsebet Jurik; Beatrix Kisházi; Éva Kóczián; Sarolta Lukacs

=== Individual ===
Event	Gold	Silver	Bronze
Men's singles	(Japan) Nobuhiko Hasegawa	(Japan) Mitsuru Kono	(West Germany) Eberhard Schöler
Men's singles	(Japan) Nobuhiko Hasegawa	(Japan) Mitsuru Kono	(Japan) Koji Kimura
Women's singles	(Japan) Sachiko Morisawa	(Japan) Naoko Fukazu	(Japan) Noriko Yamanaka
Women's singles	(Japan) Sachiko Morisawa	(Japan) Naoko Fukazu	(Soviet Union) Zoja Rudnova
Men's doubles	(Sweden) Hans Alsér (Sweden) Kjell Johansson	(Soviet Union) Anatoly Amelin (Soviet Union) Stanislav Gomozkov	(Japan) Nobuhiko Hasegawa (Japan) Mitsuru Kono
Men's doubles	(Sweden) Hans Alsér (Sweden) Kjell Johansson	(Soviet Union) Anatoly Amelin (Soviet Union) Stanislav Gomozkov	(Czechoslovakia) Vladimir Miko (Czechoslovakia) Jaroslav Staněk
Women's doubles	(Japan) Saeko Hirota (Japan) Sachiko Morisawa	(Japan) Naoko Fukazu (Japan) Noriko Yamanaka	(Soviet Union) Svetlana Grinberg (Soviet Union) Zoja Rudnova
Women's doubles	(Japan) Saeko Hirota (Japan) Sachiko Morisawa	(Japan) Naoko Fukazu (Japan) Noriko Yamanaka	(Hungary) Erzsebet Jurik (Hungary) Éva Kóczián
Mixed doubles	(Japan) Nobuhiko Hasegawa (Japan) Noriko Yamanaka	(Japan) Koji Kimura (Japan) Naoko Fukazu	(Romania) Dorin Giurgiuca (Romania) Maria Alexandru
Mixed doubles	(Japan) Nobuhiko Hasegawa (Japan) Noriko Yamanaka	(Japan) Koji Kimura (Japan) Naoko Fukazu	(Soviet Union) Anatoly Amelin (Soviet Union) Zoja Rudnova
