= 1967 World Table Tennis Championships – Mixed doubles =

1967 Mixed doubles

The 1967 World Table Tennis Championships mixed doubles was the 29th edition of the mixed doubles championship.

Nobuhiko Hasegawa and Noriko Yamanaka defeated Koji Kimura and Naoko Fukazu in the final by three sets to one.

== Results ==
Round of 16
(Japan) Nobuhiko Hasegawa (Japan) Noriko Yamanaka	21	21	21
(West Germany) Erich Arndt (West Germany) Edit Buchholz	10	17	17
(Sweden) Hans Alsér (Sweden) Eva Johansson	21	17	21	21
(England) Chester Barnes (England) Mary Wright	12	21	16	19
(Soviet Union) Anatoly Amelin (Soviet Union) Zoja Rudnova	21	21	10	19	21
(Japan) Mitsuru Kono (Japan) Sachiko Morisawa	18	16	21	21	12
(Czechoslovakia) Vladimír Miko (Czechoslovakia) Marta Lužová	21	21	21
(Hungary) Péter Rózsás (Hungary) Sarolta Lukacs	16	14	13
(West Germany) Eberhard Schöler (West Germany) Diane Schöler	21	21	21
(Sweden) Bjorne Mellstroem (Soviet Union) Laima Balaišytė	11	12	14
(Romania) Dorin Giurgiuca (Romania) Maria Alexandru	21	21	21
(Hungary) Jozsef Papp (Hungary) Éva Földy	18	9	17
(England) Denis Neale (England) Karenza Smith	18	21	21	21
(Czechoslovakia) Jaroslav Kunz (Czechoslovakia) Jitka Karlíková	21	19	12	17
(Japan) Koji Kimura (Japan) Naoko Fukazu	21	21	14	21
(Soviet Union) Sarkis Sarchayan (Soviet Union) Rita Pogosova	16	18	21	12

Quarterfinals
(Japan) Hasegawa (Japan) Yamanaka	21	21	21
(Sweden) Alsér (Sweden) Johansson	16	16	9
(Soviet Union) Amelin (Soviet Union) Rudnova	21	7	22	23	21
(Czechoslovakia) Miko (Czechoslovakia) Luzova	18	21	20	21	18
(West Germany) Schöler (West Germany) Schöler	13	10	21	13
(Romania) Giurgiuca (Romania) Alexandru	21	21	16	21
(England) Neale (England) Smith	15	19	19
(Japan) Kimura (Japan) Fukazu	21	21	21

Semifinals
(Japan) Hasegawa (Japan) Yamanaka	14	21	21	23
(Soviet Union) Amelin (Soviet Union) Rudnova	21	16	17	21
(Romania) Giurgiuca (Romania) Alexandru	9	12	17
(Japan) Kimura (Japan) Fukazu	21	21	21

Final
(Japan) Hasegawa (Japan) Yamanaka	21	22	19	21
(Japan) Kimura (Japan) Fukazu	15	20	21	14

== See also ==
List of World Table Tennis Championships medalists
