= Uldis Eglītis =

Personal information
- Full name: Uldis Eglītis
- Nationality: Soviet Union Latvia
- Born: 16 December 1950 Rīga, Latvian SSR, Soviet Union
- Died: 10 February 2020 (aged 69)
- Height: 184 cm (6 ft 0 in)

Sport
- Sport: Table tennis
- Playing style: Right-handed, shakehand grip
- Highest ranking: 27 (1970)
Medal record
Men's table tennis
Representing Soviet Union
Event	1st	2nd	3rd
European Championships	0	1	1
Total	0	1	1
Representing Soviet Union
table tennis
European Table Tennis Championships
Silver medal – second place	1968 Lyon	Team
Bronze medal – third place	1970 Moscow	Team
European Youth Championships
Gold medal – first place	1968 Leningrad	Doubles
Gold medal – first place	1967 Vejle	Singles
Gold medal – first place	1967 Vejle	Doubles
Gold medal – first place	1967 Vejle	Team
Silver medal – second place	1968 Leningrad	Team
Bronze medal – third place	1968 Leningrad	Singles

Uldis Eglītis (16 December 1950 - 10 February 2020) was a male former international table tennis player from Soviet Union and Latvia. He was a member of the Soviet Union national team that reached the final of the 1968 European Table Tennis Championships in Lyon.

== Career ==
=== Junior career ===
At the age of 14, Eglītis became the Latvian champion in singles and doubles events.

In 1967, Eglītis won three gold medals at the European Youth Championships in Vejle as a member of the Soviet national youth squad, including a singles title. A year later in Leningrad, Eglītis won another gold in the doubles event.

=== International career ===
After success on the junior level, Eglītis became a regular Soviet Union national team member, participating in the World and European Championships together with Soviet internationals, such as Stanislav Gomozkov, Anatoly Amelin and Sarkis Sarchayan.

Eglītis helped the Soviet team win silver medal at the 1968 European Championships. In the singles event, Eglītis reached the Round of 32 and lost to the Swedish international Hans Alser 1-3. In the mixed doubles event, together with Signe Paisjärv, Eglītis reached Round of 16.

In 1969, he made a debut at the World Championships in Munich. In the singles event, Eglītis was eliminated in Round of 128. He had more success in doubles (with Trevor Taylor) and mixed doubles events (with Doris Hovestädt), reaching Round of 16 in both.

The following year, Eglītis won another major accolade, helping the Soviet team win bronze medal at the 1970 European Championships. In the singles event, he lost to Kjell Johansson in the Round of 32. Eglītis also reached the Round of 16 in doubles event, again being eliminated by Swedish players - Hans Alser and Kjell Johansson.

After 1970, Eglītis was not selected anymore to the Soviet team roster for the participation at the World and European Championships. He continued to play locally, winning his final Latvian title in 1983.

=== Death ===
Eglītis died on 10 February 2020 at the age of 69.

== Accolades ==
Eglītis was one of the most accomplished Latvian table tennis players of all time with 24 gold medals won at the national championships, including 7 singles titles. On the professional circuit, Eglītis won two singles and doubles titles in his career.

He remains the only Latvian table tennis male player to win the medals on the international arena.

== See also ==
- List of table tennis players
