= Carl-Johan Bernhardt =

Swedish table tennis player

Personal information
- Nationality: Sweden
- Born: 8 March 1946
- Died: 16 March 2016 (aged 70) Falkenberg, Sweden
Medal record
Representing Sweden
World Table Tennis Championships
Bronze medal – third place	1963	Men's Team
Bronze medal – third place	1967	Men's Team

Carl-Johan Bernhardt (8 March 1946 – 16 March 2016) was a Swedish international table tennis player.

He won two bronze medals at the 1963 World Table Tennis Championships and 1967 World Table Tennis Championships in the Swaythling Cup (men's team event).

The 1963 team consisted of Hans Alsér, Stellan Bengtsson and Kjell Johansson, and the 1967 team consisted of Alsér, Christer Johansson, Kjell Johansson and Bo Persson.

He was a five times gold medal winner in the team event at the European Table Tennis Championships and played 90 times for the Swedish national team.

== See also ==
- List of table tennis players
- List of World Table Tennis Championships medalists
