= 1967 World Table Tennis Championships – Men's singles =

1967 Men's singles

The 1967 World Table Tennis Championships men's singles was the 29th edition of the men's singles championship.

Nobuhiko Hasegawa defeated Mitsuru Kono in the final, winning three sets to two to secure the title.

== Results ==
Round of 16
(Japan) Mitsuru Kono	21	21	16	18	21
(Soviet Union) Stanislav Gomozkov	17	17	21	21	18
(East Germany) Siegfried Lemke	13	12	21	13
(North Korea) Pak Sin Il	21	21	14	21
(Czechoslovakia) Vladimir Miko	21	21	14	15	21
(Hungary) Matyas Beleznai	16	8	21	21	18
(Japan) Koji Kimura	21	21	21
(Soviet Union) Sarkis Sarchayan	18	11	15
(West Germany) Eberhard Schöler	21	21	21
(Romania) Radu Negulescu	13	13	9
(North Korea) Kim Chang-Ho	21	21	21
(Soviet Union) Anatoly Amelin	14	10	17
(Socialist Federal Republic of Yugoslavia) Istvan Korpa	21	21	11	21
(Japan) Kenji Kasai	13	14	21	13
(Japan) Nobuhiko Hasegawa	21	21	21
(Romania) Gheorge Cobirzan	19	9	12

Quarterfinals
(Japan) Kohno	21	21	21
(North Korea) Sin Il	15	19	12
(Czechoslovakia) Miko	16	21	18	21	15
(Japan) Kimura	21	14	21	17	21
(West Germany) Schöler	20	18	21	21	23
(North Korea) Chang Ho	22	21	19	15	21
(Socialist Federal Republic of Yugoslavia) Korpa	14	14	17
(Japan) Hasegawa	21	21	21

Semifinals
(Japan) Kohno	21	19	21	21
(Japan) Kimura	17	21	19	13
(West Germany) Schöler	20	14	9
(Japan) Hasegawa	22	21	21

Final
(Japan) Kohno	8	21	22	14	16
(Japan) Hasegawa	21	19	20	21	21

== See also ==
- List of World Table Tennis Championships medalists
