= English Open (table tennis) =

Tournament information
- Event name: English Open
- Founded: 1927
- Abolished: 2011
- Location: Sheffield (2011)
- Venue: English Institute of Sport (2011)
- Prize money: US$172,000 (2011)

The English Open was a table tennis tournament in England, last staged by the International Table Tennis Federation (ITTF) in Sheffield in 2011.

== History ==
The tournament was first held as the English Open in 1927 by the English Table Tennis Association. Apart from a wartime break in the early 1940s, the tournament was held every year until 1980, and then every two years until the early 1990s.

In 1996, the ITTF decided to include that year's English Open in Kettering as the very first event of the first ever ITTF Pro Tour. The tournament went on to feature in the ITTF Pro Tour five more times, in 1997, 1999, 2001, 2009 and in 2011, when it was held for the last time.

The record for the most men's singles tournament wins is held by Richard Bergmann, who won six titles between 1939 and 1954, including two while representing Austria and four while representing England. Maria Alexandru of Romania holds the record for the most women's singles tournaments wins, having won six titles between 1963 and 1974.

== Champions ==
=== English National Championships, 1921-1926 ===
From 1921 to 1926 the tournament was called the English National Championships and was organised by the Table Tennis Association.

Season	Men's Singles	Women's Singles
1921/22	(England) Andrew Donaldson	(England) F Scott
1922/23	(England) Mike Cohen	(England) Kathleen Berry
1923/24	(England) Percy Bromfield	(England) Kathleen Berry
1924/25	(India) P.N. Nanda	(England) Kathleen Berry
1925/26	(India) S.R.G Suppiah	(England) Greta Vasey

=== English Open Championships, 1927-1995 ===
In April 1927 the Table Tennis Association was dissolved and re-formed as the English Table Tennis Association. The first English Open Championships were held that year.

==== Senior events ====
Season	Men's Singles	Women's Singles	Men's Doubles	Women's Doubles	Mixed Doubles
1926/27	(India) S.R.G. Suppiah	(Wales) Dolly Gubbins	(England) Percy Bromfield (England) Lionel Farris	(Wales) Dolly Gubbins (England) Joan Ingram	(England) Lionel Farris (England) Joan Ingram
1927/28	(Hungary) Daniel Pecsi	(Germany) Erika Metzger	(England) Charlie Bull (England) Fred Perry	(England) Winifred Land (England) Brenda Sommerville	(Hungary) Daniel Pecsi (Germany) Erika Metzger
1928/29	(Czechoslovakia) Antonín Malecek	(Czechoslovakia) Marie Šmídová	(England) Charlie Bull (England) Fred Perry	(England) Phyllis Moser (Czechoslovakia) Marie Šmídová	(England) Fred Perry (England) Winifred Land
1929/30	(Hungary) Sándor Glancz	(Wales) Dolly Gubbins	(England) Charlie Bull (England) Fred Perry	(Hungary) Magda Gál (England) Winifred Land	(Hungary) Sándor Glancz (Hungary) Magda Gál
1930/31	(Hungary) Miklós Szabados	(England) Valerie Bromfield	(Hungary) Viktor Barna (Hungary) Miklós Szabados	(England) Mary Holt (England) N Wood	(Hungary) Sándor Glancz (England) Valerie Bromfield
1931/32	(Hungary) Miklós Szabados	(Hungary) Mária Mednyánszky	(Czechoslovakia) Stanislav Kolár (Czechoslovakia) Antonín Malecek	(England) H Martin (Hungary) Mária Mednyánszky	(Hungary) Miklós Szabados (Hungary) Mária Mednyánszky
1932/33	(Hungary) Viktor Barna	(England) Dora Emdin	(Hungary) Viktor Barna (Hungary) Sándor Glancz	(England) N Wood (England) Wendy Woodhead	(Hungary) Viktor Barna (England) Dora Emdin
1933/34	(Hungary) Viktor Barna	(England) Margaret Osborne	(Hungary) Viktor Barna (England) Tommy Sears	(England) Dora Emdin (England) Phyllis Moser	(Hungary) Viktor Barna (England) Dora Emdin
1934/35	(Hungary) Viktor Barna	(England) Margaret Osborne	(Hungary) Viktor Barna (England) Tommy Sears	(England) Margaret Osborne (England) Wendy Woodhead	(Hungary) Viktor Barna (England) Margaret Osborne
1935/36	(Poland) Alojzy Ehrlich	(Czechoslovakia) Marie Kettnerová	(Hungary) Laszlo Bellak (Hungary) Miklós Szabados	(England) Dora Emdin (Germany) Astrid Krebsbach	(Hungary) Viktor Barna (England) Margaret Osborne
1936/37	(Hungary) Viktor Barna	(United States) Ruth Aarons	(United States) Abe Berenbaum (United States) Sol Schiff	(England) Margaret Osborne (England) Wendy Woodhead	(United States) Buddy Blattner (United States) Ruth Aarons
1937/38	(Hungary) Viktor Barna	(Hungary) Dora Beregi	(Hungary) Viktor Barna (Hungary) Laszlo Bellak	(England) Margaret Osborne (England) Wendy Woodhead	(Hungary) Viktor Barna (England) Margaret Osborne
1938/39	(Austria) Richard Bergmann	(England) Jean Nicoll	(Hungary) Viktor Barna (Hungary) Laszlo Bellak	(Czechoslovakia) Vlasta Depetrisová (Czechoslovakia) Vera Votrubcová	(Czechoslovakia) Bohumil Váňa (Czechoslovakia) Vera Votrubcová
1939/40	(Austria) Richard Bergmann	(England) Vera Dace	(Austria) Richard Bergmann (Austria) Alfred Liebster	(England) Dora Beregi (England) Jean Nicoll	(Hungary) Viktor Barna (Hungary) Dora Beregi
1945/46	(Czechoslovakia) Bohumil Váňa	(England) Dora Beregi	(Czechoslovakia) Adolf Šlár (Czechoslovakia) Bohumil Váňa	(England) Dora Beregi (England) Vera Dace	(England) Eric Filby (England) Dora Beregi
1946/47	(Czechoslovakia) Václav Tereba	(Hungary) Gizi Farkas	(Czechoslovakia) Abe Berenbaum (Czechoslovakia) Bohumil Váňa	(England) Elizabeth Blackbourn (England) Vera Dace	(Czechoslovakia) Bohumil Váňa (Czechoslovakia) Vera Votrubcová
1947/48	(England) Richard Bergmann	(Hungary) Gizi Farkas	(England) Richard Bergmann (Sweden) Tage Flisberg	(England) Pinkie Barnes (Hungary) Gizi Farkas	(Hungary) Ferenc Sidó (Hungary) Gizi Farkas
1948/49	(United States) Marty Reisman	(United States) Peggy McLean	(England) Viktor Barna (England) Richard Bergmann	(United States) Peggy McLean (United States) Leah Thall	(United States) Dick Miles (United States) Leah Thall
1949/50	(England) Richard Bergmann	(United States) Mildred Shahian	(Socialist Federal Republic of Yugoslavia) Žarko Dolinar (Socialist Federal Republic of Yugoslavia) Vilim Harangozo	(England) Diane Rowe (England) Rosalind Rowe	(England) Johnny Leach (England) Peggy Franks
1950/51	(France) Alojzy Ehrlich	(Austria) Trude Pritzi	(England) Jack Carrington (England) Johnny Leach	(England) Diane Rowe (England) Rosalind Rowe	(England) Viktor Barna (Scotland) Helen Elliot
1951/52	(England) Richard Bergmann	(Austria) Linde Wertl	(Socialist Federal Republic of Yugoslavia) Žarko Dolinar (Socialist Federal Republic of Yugoslavia) Vilim Harangozo	(England) Diane Rowe (England) Rosalind Rowe	(England) Johnny Leach (England) Diane Rowe
1952/53	(France) Michel Haguenauer	(England) Rosalind Rowe	(England) Richard Bergmann (England) Johnny Leach	(England) Diane Rowe (England) Rosalind Rowe	(England) Viktor Barna (England) Rosalind Rowe
1953/54	(England) Richard Bergmann	(Austria) Linde Wertl	(England) Brian Kennedy (England) Aubrey Simons	(England) Diane Rowe (England) Rosalind Rowe	(England) Johnny Leach (England) Diane Rowe
1954/55	(Socialist Federal Republic of Yugoslavia) Žarko Dolinar	(England) Rosalind Rowe	(Czechoslovakia) Ivan Andreadis (Czechoslovakia) Ladislav Štípek	(England) Diane Rowe (England) Rosalind Rowe	(England) Aubrey Simons (Scotland) Helen Elliot
1955/56	(Hungary) Elemér Gyetvai	(Hungary) Gizi Farkas	(Hungary) Elemér Gyetvai (Hungary) Kálmán Szepesi	(England) Ann Haydon (England) Diane Rowe	(England) Johnny Leach (England) Diane Rowe
1956/57	(Hungary) Zoltán Berczik	(Japan) Fujie Eguchi	(Japan) Ichiro Ogimura (Japan) Toshiaki Tanaka	(Japan) Taeko Namba (Japan) Tomi Okawa	(Japan) Keisuke Tsunoda (Japan) Taeko Namba
1957/58	(Hungary) Ferenc Sidó	(Netherlands) Agnes Simon	(Hungary) Zoltán Berczik (Hungary) Ferenc Sidó	(England) Ann Haydon (England) Pamela Mortimer	(Hungary) Ferenc Sidó (Hungary) Éva Kóczián
1958/59	(Japan) Ichiro Ogimura	(Japan) Fujie Eguchi	(Japan) Teruo Murakami (Japan) Ichiro Ogimura	(Japan) Fujie Eguchi (Japan) Kimiyo Matsuzaki	(Japan) Teruo Murakami (Japan) Kimiyo Matsuzaki
1959/60	(England) Ian Harrison	(Netherlands) Agnes Simon	(England) Johnny Leach (England) Michael Thornhill	(England) Kathy Best (England) Diane Rowe	(England) Ian Harrison (England) Diane Rowe
1960/61	(Socialist Federal Republic of Yugoslavia) Victor Markovic	(Hungary) Eva Kóczián-Földy	(Sweden) Hans Alsér (Sweden) Tony Larsson	(England) Kathy Best (Netherlands) Agnes Simon	(Hungary) Zoltán Berczik (Hungary) Eva Kóczián-Földy
1961/62	(Hungary) Zoltán Berczik	(England) Diane Rowe	(Czechoslovakia) Ivan Andreadis (Czechoslovakia) Vladimír Miko	(England) Diane Rowe (England) Mary Shannon	(Hungary) Zoltán Berczik (Hungary) Sarolta Lukacs
1962/63	(Hungary) Zoltán Berczik	(Romania) Maria Alexandru	(Czechoslovakia) Ivan Andreadis (Czechoslovakia) Vilim Harangozo	(England) Diane Rowe (England) Mary Shannon	(Hungary) János Faházi (Hungary) Eva Kóczián-Földy
1963/64	(Romania) Dorin Giurgiuca	(Romania) Maria Alexandru	(Hungary) János Faházi (Hungary) Péter Rózsás	(England) Diane Rowe (England) Mary Shannon	(Hungary) Péter Rózsás (Hungary) Sarolta Lukacs
1964/65	(West Germany) Eberhard Schöler	(Czechoslovakia) Marta Luzova	(Czechoslovakia) Vladimír Miko (Czechoslovakia) Jaroslav Stanek	(England) Diane Rowe (England) Mary Shannon	(Czechoslovakia) Vladimír Miko (Czechoslovakia) Marta Luzova
1966/67	(Czechoslovakia) Jaroslav Stanek	(England) Mary Shannon-Wright	(Czechoslovakia) Vladimír Miko (Czechoslovakia) Jaroslav Stanek	(Romania) Maria Alexandru (Romania) Eleonora Mihalca	(Czechoslovakia) Vladimír Miko (Czechoslovakia) Marta Luzova
1967/68	(Soviet Union) Stanislav Gomozkov	(Romania) Eleonora Mihalca	(Socialist Federal Republic of Yugoslavia) Istvan Korpa (Socialist Federal Republic of Yugoslavia) Dragutin Šurbek	(Soviet Union) Svetlana Grinberg (Soviet Union) Zoja Rudnova	(Soviet Union) Stanislav Gomozkov (Soviet Union) Zoja Rudnova
1968/69	(Soviet Union) Stanislav Gomozkov	(Soviet Union) Zoja Rudnova	(Soviet Union) Anatoly Amelin (Soviet Union) Stanislav Gomozkov	(Soviet Union) Svetlana Grinberg (Soviet Union) Zoja Rudnova	(West Germany) Eberhard Schöler (West Germany) Diane Schöler
1969/70	(Czechoslovakia) Štefan Kollárovits	(Romania) Maria Alexandru	(Hungary) István Jónyer (Hungary) Tibor Klampár	(England) Karenza Mathews (England) Mary Shannon-Wright	(England) Denis Neale (England) Mary Shannon-Wright
1970/71	(Hungary) Tibor Klampár	(Romania) Maria Alexandru	(Sweden) Stellan Bengtsson (Sweden) Bo Persson	(Romania) Maria Alexandru (Romania) Eleonora Mihalca	(Socialist Federal Republic of Yugoslavia) Antun Stipancic (Romania) Maria Alexandru
1971/72	(Sweden) Stellan Bengtsson	(Romania) Maria Alexandru	(Socialist Federal Republic of Yugoslavia) Antun Stipancic (Socialist Federal Republic of Yugoslavia) Dragutin Šurbek	(Romania) Maria Alexandru (Romania) Eleanora Vlaicov	(Czechoslovakia) Milan Orlowski (Czechoslovakia) Ilona Uhlíková-Voštová
1972/73	(Sweden) Stellan Bengtsson	(Sweden) Brigitta Radberg	(Sweden) Stellan Bengtsson (Sweden) Kjell Johansson	(Czechoslovakia) Miloslava Polackova (Czechoslovakia) Ilona Uhlíková-Voštová	(Czechoslovakia) Milan Orlowski (Czechoslovakia) Ilona Uhlíková-Voštová
1973/74	(Sweden) Kjell Johansson	(Romania) Maria Alexandru	(Sweden) Stellan Bengtsson (Sweden) Kjell Johansson	(Romania) Maria Alexandru (Czechoslovakia) Alica Grofová	(Sweden) Bo Persson (Sweden) Brigitta Radberg
1974/75	(Soviet Union) Anatoli Strokatov	(Soviet Union) Elmira Antonyan	(Soviet Union) Stanislav Gomozkov (Soviet Union) Anatoli Strokatov	(China) Yen Kuei-li (China) Yu Ching Chia	(China) Li Ching-Kwang (China) Yen Kuei-li
1975/76	(Sweden) Stellan Bengtsson	(England) Jill Hammersley	(England) Desmond Douglas (England) Denis Neale	(Czechoslovakia) Blanka Silhanova (Czechoslovakia) Ilona Uhlíková-Voštová	(Sweden) Stellan Bengtsson (Sweden) Ann Hellman
1976/77	(Soviet Union) Stanislav Gomozkov	(England) Carole Knight	(Soviet Union) Stanislav Gomozkov (Soviet Union) Anatoli Strokatov	(England) Jill Hammersley (England) Linda Howard	(Soviet Union) Bagrat Burnazian (Soviet Union) Tatiana Ferdman
1977/78	(China) Li Chen-Shih	(China) Chu Hsiang-Yun	(China) Li Chen-Shih (China) Wang Huiyuan	(China) Chu Hsiang-Yun (China) Wei Li Chieh	(England) Desmond Douglas (England) Linda Howard
1978/79	(China) Kou Yao-Hua	(England) Jill Hammersley	(China) Kou Yao-Hua (China) Liang Ko-liang	(Hungary) Judit Magos (Hungary) Gabriela Szabo	(England) Desmond Douglas (England) Linda Howard
1979/80	(England) Desmond Douglas	(England) Jill Hammersley	(Poland) Andrzej Grubba (Poland) Leszek Kucharski	(Czechoslovakia) Blanka Silhanova (Czechoslovakia) Ilona Uhlíková-Voštová	(Sweden) Erik Lindh (Sweden) Marie Lindblad
1981/82	(China) Teng Yi	(China) Chen Lili	(China) Teng Yi (China) Fan Changmao	(China) Dai Lili (China) Chen Jieling	(China) Chen Xinhua (China) Chen Lili
1983/84	(England) Desmond Douglas	(Soviet Union) Anita Zakharjan	(Sweden) Jonny Akesson (Sweden) Jörgen Persson	(France) Patricia Germain (France) Brigitte Thiriet	(Japan) Seiji Ono (Japan) Yoshiko Shimauchi
1985/86	(Socialist Federal Republic of Yugoslavia) Zoran Kalinic	(Soviet Union) Ellen Kovtun	(Socialist Federal Republic of Yugoslavia) Zoran Kalinic (Japan) Masahiro Maehara	(England) Alison Gordon (England) Joy Grundy	(England) Desmond Douglas (England) Alison Gordon
1987/88	(Sweden) Jörgen Persson	(China) Li Huifen	(Poland) Andrzej Grubba (Poland) Leszek Kucharski	(Bulgaria) Daniela Guergueltcheva (Soviet Union) Valentina Popova	(China) Wei Qingguang (China) Li Huifen
1989/90	(China) Yu Shentong	(Japan) Mika Hoshino	(China) Wei Qingguang (China) Chen Longcan	(South Korea) Kim Youn Sook (South Korea) Lee Jung Ae	(France) Jean-Philippe Gatien (France) Xiaoming Wang-Dréchou
1991/92	(France) Jean-Philippe Gatien	(Netherlands) Mirjam Hooman	(Sweden) Mikael Appelgren (Sweden) Jan-Ove Waldner	(Commonwealth of Independent States) Irina Palina (Commonwealth of Independent States) Elena Timina	(France) Jean-Philippe Gatien (France) Xiaoming Wang-Dréchou
1994/95	(France) Damien Éloi	(Netherlands) Bettine Vriesekoop	(France) Damien Éloi (France) Christophe Legoût	(Sweden) Åsa Svensson (Sweden) Marie Svensson	n/a

==== Veteran events ====
Season	Veteran men's singles	Veteran women's singles
1932/33	(Hungary) Zoltán Mechlovits	
1933/34	(England) J Thompson	
1934/35	(England) A J Wilmott	
1935/36	(England) E C Gunn	
1936/37	(England) A Melnick	
1937/38	(England) H Knibbs	
1938/39	(Hungary) Zoltán Mechlovits	
1939/40	(England) A J Wilmott	
1945/46	(England) R V Bryant	
1946/47	(England) J Taylor	
1947/48	(England) Edgar Reay	
1948/49	(England) S Sugarhood	
1949/50	(England) S Sugarhood	(Wales) N Evans
1950/51	(England) Leo Thompson	(France) S Betling
1951/52	(England) Alex Brook	(France) S Betling
1952/53	(England) L C Kerslake	(England) I B Bell
1953/54	(England) L C Kerslake	(England) C Cook
1954/55	(England) Alex Brook	(England) I Huntner
1955/56	(England) H Spears	(England) G Davies
1956/57	(England) L C Kerslake	(England) I B Bell
1957/58	(England) L C Kerslake	(England) V Cherriman
1958/59	(England) Ronald Sharman	(England) I B Bell
1959/60	(England) Ronald Sharman	(England) I B Bell
1960/61	(England) Ronald Craydon	(England) C Whitehouse
1961/62	(England) Ronald Craydon	(England) C Whitehouse
1962/63	(England) Ronald Craydon	(England) D Crosby
1963/64	(England) Harry Venner	(England) D Crosby
1964/65	(England) Harry Venner	(England) Gladys Horn
1966/67	(England) Harry Venner	(England) Majorie Cumberbatch
1967/68	(England) Lou Hoffman	(England) Majorie Cumberbatch
1968/69	(England) S Norton	(England) Judy Williams
1969/70	(England) Jack Clayton	(England) Judy Williams
1970/71	(England) Gordon Chapman	(England) Molly Prowen
1971/72	(England) Ron Ethridge	(England) Daphne Gray
1972/73	(England) Derek Schofield	(England) Daphne Gray
1973/74	(England) K Beamish	(England) Daphne Gray
1974/75	(England) Peter D\'Arcy	(England) Daphne Gray
1975/76	(England) Henry Buist	(England) Daphne Gray
1976/77	(England) Derek Schofield	n/a
1977/78	(England) Derek Schofield	n/a
1978/79	(Austria) H Bolena	n/a
1991/92	(England) John Hilton	(Netherlands) Judy Williams
1995/96	(England) John Hilton	(England) Pauline Perry

Season	Veteran men's doubles	Veteran women's doubles
1991/92	(England) John Hilton (England) Malcolm Corking	(England) D Dawson (England) L Radford

==== Team events ====
Men's and women's team events were held as part of the English Open from 1963 to 1992.

Season	Men's Team	Women's Team
1962/63	Czechoslovakia	Hungary
1963/64	Yugoslavia	Hungary
1964/65	Romania	England
1966/67	Czechoslovakia	Hungary
1967/68	Yugoslavia	Czechoslovakia
1968/69	Sweden	Soviet Union
1969/70	England	Romania
1970/71	England	West Germany
1971/72	Sweden	Czechoslovakia
1972/73	Sweden	Sweden
1973/74	Sweden	Sweden
1974/75	England	China
1975/76	England	Sweden
1976/77	England	England
1977/78	China	China
1978/79	China	Czechoslovakia
1979/80	England	Czechoslovakia
1981/82	China	China
1983/84	Japan	Soviet Union
1985/86	Yugoslavia	Czechoslovakia
1987/88	China	China
1989/90	China	South Korea
1991/92	Germany	Sweden

=== ITTF Pro Tour English Open, 1996-2011 ===
The ITTF Pro Tour included the English Open in its schedule on six occasions from 1996 to 2011.

Season	Host	Men's Singles	Women's Singles	Men's Doubles	Women's Doubles	U21 Men's Singles	U21 Women's Singles
1996	Kettering	(China); Kong Linghui	(China); Yang Ying	(Austria) Werner Schlager (Austria) Karl Jindrak	(China) Yang Ying (China) Wang Hui	(Japan); Ryo Yuzawa	(Japan); Keiko Okazaki
1997	Kettering	(Belgium); Jean-Michel Saive	(Chinese Taipei); Tong Fei-ming	(France) Christophe Legout (France) Patrick Chila	(Hong Kong) Chai Po Wa (China) Qiao Yunping	(Denmark); Martin Monrad	(Japan); Fumie Kawano
1999	Hopton-on-Sea	(China); Ma Wenge	(Germany); Jie Schöpp	(Netherlands) Trinko Keen (Netherlands) Danny Heister	(South Korea) Lee Eun-sil (South Korea) Ryu Ji-hae	(China); Cheng Yuan Su	(Japan); An Konishi
2001	Chatham	(China); Wang Liqin	(Japan); Yoshie Takada	(Germany) Timo Boll (Germany) Zoltan Fejer-Konnerth	(North Korea) Kim Hyang-mi (North Korea) Kim Hyon-hui	(Germany); Bastian Steger	(South Korea); Kim Yun-mi
2009	Sheffield	(China); Ma Long	(China); Guo Yan	(China) Ma Long (China) Wang Liqin	(South Korea) Kim Kyungah (South Korea) Park Mi-young	(South Korea); Seo Hyun-deok	(Romania); Daniela Dodean
2011	Sheffield	(China); Chen Qi	(China); Ding Ning	(China) Xu Xin (China) Zhang Jike	(China) Guo Yan (China) Guo Yue	(South Korea); Seo Hyun-deok	(Japan); Kasumi Ishikawa

== See also ==
- English National Table Tennis Championships
- Table Tennis England
