= 1967 World Table Tennis Championships – Women's team =

1967 Corbillon Cup (women's team)

The 1967 World Table Tennis Championships – Corbillon Cup (women's team) was the 22nd edition of the women's team championship.

Japan won the gold medal, the Soviet Union won the silver medal and Hungary won the bronze medal.

== Medalists ==
Event	Gold	Silver	Bronze
	Japan; Naoko Fukatsu; Saeko Hirota; Sachiko Morisawa; Noriko Yamanaka	Soviet Union; Laima Balaišytė; Svetlana Grinberg; Signe Paisjärv; Zoja Rudnova	Hungary; Erzsebet Jurik; Beatrix Kisházi; Éva Kóczián; Sarolta Lukacs

== Second stage ==
=== Final tables ===
==== Group A ====
Pos	Team	P	W	L	Pts
1	Japan	3	3	0	6
2	Czechoslovakia	3	2	1	4
3	England	3	1	2	2
4	East Germany	3	0	3	0

==== Group B ====
Pos	Team	P	W	L	Pts
1	Soviet Union	3	3	0	6
2	Hungary	3	2	1	4
3	Romania	3	1	2	2
4	West Germany	3	0	3	0

== Third-place playoff ==
Team One	Team Two	Score
Hungary	Czechoslovakia	3–2

== Final ==
Japan 3		Soviet Union 0	Score
Yamanaka	bt	Rudnova	21–17 22–20
Fukatsu	bt	Grinberg	21–18 21–17
Fukatsu & Yamanaka	bt	Balaišytė & Rudnova	20–22 21–19 21–14

== See also ==
List of World Table Tennis Championships medalists
