= Kagimoto =

Kagimoto (written: 鍵本) is a Japanese surname.

Notable people with the surname include:

- Akira Kagimoto (鍵本 輝; born 1988), Japanese singer and member of hip-hop group Lead
- Hajime Kagimoto (鍵本 肇), Japanese table tennis player
