= Balaišis =

- Lithuanian surname
- m.: Balaišis
- f.: (unmarried): Balaišytė
- f.: (married): Balaišienė

Balaišis is a Lithuanian surname. Notable people with this surname include:

- Brone Balaišienė (1921–1983), Lithuanian table tennis player and coach
- Laima Balaišytė (born 1948) former Lithuanian table tennis player,
- Pranciskus Balaišis (born 1942) Lithuanian radio engineer
