= Christer Johansson (table tennis) =

Swedish table tennis player (born 1944)

Personal information
- Nationality: Sweden
- Born: 10 December 1944 (age 81)
Medal record
Representing Sweden
World Table Tennis Championships
Bronze medal – third place	1967	Men's Team

Christer Johansson (born 10 December 1944) is a Swedish former international table tennis player.

He won a bronze medal at the 1967 World Table Tennis Championships in the Swaythling Cup (men's team event) with Hans Alsér, Kjell Johansson (his brother) and Bo Persson.

He was a two times gold medal winner in the team event at the European Table Tennis Championships and later became national coach of Sweden.

== See also ==
- List of table tennis players
- List of World Table Tennis Championships medalists
