= János Faházi =

Hungarian table tennis player

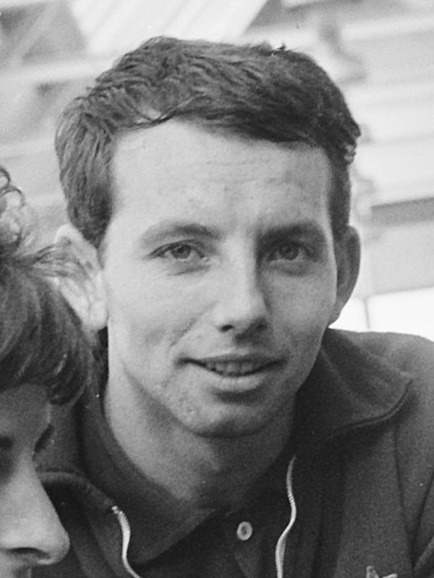
- János Faházi in 1964

Personal information
- Nationality: Hungary
- Born: 23 April 1942 (age 84) Budapest

Sport
- Sport: Table tennis
Medal record
Table tennis
Representing Hungary
World Championships
Bronze medal – third place	1963 Prague	Mixed doubles
European Championships
Bronze medal – third place	1964 Malmo	Doubles
Bronze medal – third place	1964 Malmo	Mixed doubles

János Faházi (born 23 April 1942) is a retired Hungarian international table tennis player.

== Table tennis career ==
He won a bronze medal in the mixed doubles with Éva Kóczián at the 1963 World Table Tennis Championships. The same years he won doubles and mixed doubles events at the English Open.

== See also ==
- List of table tennis players
- List of World Table Tennis Championships medalists
