= Jung Kil-hwa =

North Korean table tennis player

Jung Kil-Hwa
Personal information
- Nationality: North Korea
Medal record
Representing North Korea
World Table Tennis Championships
Bronze medal – third place	1965	Men's Team

Jung Kil-Hwa is a male former international table tennis player from North Korea.

He won a bronze medal at the 1965 World Table Tennis Championships in the Swaythling Cup (men's team event) with Jung Ryang-Woong, Kim Chang-Ho, Kim Jung-Sam and Pak Sin Il.

He was world ranked 10 in the 1965 men's singles event but failed to progress to the round of 16.

== See also ==
- List of table tennis players
- List of World Table Tennis Championships medalists
