= Péter Rózsás =

Hungarian table tennis player (1943–2024)

Personal information
- Nationality: Hungary
- Born: 1943 Budapest, Hungary
- Died: 4 December 2024 (aged 81) Budapest, Hungary
Medal record
Representing Hungary
World Table Tennis Championships
Bronze medal – third place	1961	Men's team

Péter Rózsás (1943 – 4 December 2024) was a Hungarian international table tennis player.

== Table tennis career ==
Rózsás won a bronze medal in the Swaythling Cup (team event) at the 1961 World Table Tennis Championships for Hungary with Zoltán Berczik, László Földy, Miklós Péterfy and Ferenc Sidó.

He also won three European Table Tennis Championships medals including two golds and two English Open titles.

== Death ==
Rózsás died in Budapest on 4 December 2024, at the age of 81.

== See also ==
- List of table tennis players
- List of World Table Tennis Championships medalists
