= Zoran Kalinić =

Yugoslav Croatian table tennis player

Zoran
Personal information
- Full name: Kalinić Zoran
- Nationality: Yugoslavia
- Born: 20 July 1958 (age 68) Subotica, PR Serbia, FPR Yugoslavia

Sport
- Sport: Table tennis
Medal record
Men's table tennis
Representing Yugoslavia
World Championships
Gold medal – first place	1983 Tokyo	Doubles
Silver medal – second place	1989 Dortmund	Doubles
Silver medal – second place	1989 Dortmund	Mixed Doubles
Silver medal – second place	1991 Chiba City	Team
European Championships
Gold medal – first place	1982 Budapest	Doubles
Gold medal – first place	1984 Moscow	Doubles
Gold medal – first place	1994 Birmingham	Doubles
Bronze medal – third place	1986 Prague	Doubles
Bronze medal – third place	1996 Bratislava	Doubles

Zoran Kalinić (born 20 July 1958) is a Serbian retired table tennis player who represented SFR Yugoslavia (1976–1991) and FR Yugoslavia (1991–1998).

== Table tennis career ==
He began playing table tennis in 1969. He turned pro in 1976. He won 15 medals in European and World championships.

His four World Championship medals included a gold medal in the doubles at the 1983 World Table Tennis Championships with Dragutin Šurbek.

He also won two English Open titles.

He was nominated for the Sportsperson of Yugoslavia in 1994. He is the current national association president.

== Biography ==
He is the father of basketball player Nikola Kalinić (b. 1991).

== See also ==
- List of table tennis players
- List of World Table Tennis Championships medalists
