= European Table Tennis Championships =

International table tennis competition

- Most recent season or competition: 2026 European Table Tennis Championships
- Sport: Table tennis
- First season: 1958
- Confederation: Europe (ETTU)
- Sponsor: Liebherr
- Website: ettu.org

The European Table Tennis Championships is an international table tennis competition for the national teams of the member associations of the European Table Tennis Union (ETTU). First held in 1958, the ETTU organised the European Championships every two years in even-numbered years until 2002, when they changed to odd-numbered years. Since 2007, the competition has been contested annually.

== Editions ==
=== European Table Tennis Championships ===
The Championships include seven events: men's singles, doubles and team; women's singles, doubles and team, and mixed doubles. From 2009 until 2013, the mixed doubles tournament was organised separately from the other events.

In 2015, the ETTU announced that from 2016 the Championships would feature only individual events (men's singles and doubles, women's singles and doubles, and mixed doubles) in even-numbered years, with only team events taking place in odd-numbered years.

Edition	Year	Host City	Host Country	Events
1	1958	Budapest	Hungarian People's Republic	7
2	1960	Zagreb	Yugoslavia	7
3	1962	Berlin	West Germany	7
4	1964	Malmö	Sweden	7
5	1966	London	England	7
6	1968	Lyon	France	7
7	1970	Moscow	Soviet Union	7
8	1972	Rotterdam	Netherlands	7
9	1974	Novi Sad	Yugoslavia	7
10	1976	Prague	Czechoslovakia	7
11	1978	Duisburg	West Germany	7
12	1980	Bern	Switzerland	7
13	1982	Budapest	Hungary	7
14	1984	Moscow	Soviet Union	7
15	1986	Prague	Czechoslovakia	7
16	1988	Paris	France	7
17	1990	Gothenburg	Sweden	7
18	1992	Stuttgart	Germany	7
19	1994	Birmingham	England	7
20	1996	Bratislava	Slovakia	7
21	1998	Eindhoven	Netherlands	7
22	2000	Bremen	Germany	7
23	2002	Zagreb	Croatia	7
24	2003	Courmayeur	Italy	7
25	2005	Aarhus	Denmark	7
26	2007	Belgrade	Serbia	7
27	2008	Saint Petersburg	Russia	6
28	2009	Stuttgart - Subotica	Germany - Serbia	7
29	2010	Ostrava - Subotica	Czech Republic - Serbia	7
30	2011	Gdańsk - Sopot - Istanbul	Poland - Turkey	7
31	2012	Herning - Buzău	Denmark - Romania	5
32	2013	Schwechat - Buzău	Austria - Romania	7
33	2014	Lisbon	Portugal	2
34	2015	Yekaterinburg	Russia	6
35	2016	Budapest	Hungary	5
36	2017	Luxembourg	Luxembourg	2
37	2018	Alicante	Spain	5
38	2019	Nantes	France	2
39	2020	Warsaw	Poland	5
40	2021	Cluj Napoca	Romania	2
41	2022	Munich	Germany	5
42	2023	Malmö	Sweden	2
43	2024	Linz	Austria	5
44	2025	Zadar	Croatia	2
45	2026	Ljubljana	Slovenia	5

=== European Under-21 Table Tennis Championships ===
Edition	Year	Host City	Host Country	Events
1	2017	Sochi	Russia	4
2	2018	Minsk	Belarus	4
3	2019	Gondomar	Portugal	4
4	2020	Varaždin	Croatia	4
5	2021	Spa	Belgium	5
6	2022	Cluj-Napoca	Romania	5
7	2023	Sarajevo	Bosnia and Herzegovina	5
8	2024	Skopje	North Macedonia	5
9	2025	Bratislava	Slovakia	5

=== European Youth Table Tennis Championships ===
The European Youth Table Tennis Championships were first held in 1955 in Stuttgart. The tournament has been held yearly (except 1960, 1963, 1964). Juniors (under 18) and Cadets (under 15).

Edition	Year	Host City	Host Country	Events (J+C)	Ref
1	1955	Stuttgart	West Germany	5+0	
2	1956	Opatija	Yugoslavia	6+0	
3	1957	Donaueschingen	West Germany	7+0	
4	1958	Falkenberg	Sweden	7+0	
5	1959	Constanta	Romanian People's Republic	7+0	
6	1961	Bad Blankenburg	East Germany	7+0	
7	1962	Bled	Yugoslavia	7+0	
8	1965	Prague	Czechoslovakia	7+0	
9	1966	Szombathely	Hungarian People's Republic	7+2	
10	1967	Vejle	Denmark	7+0	
11	1968	Leningrad	Soviet Union	7+2	
12	1969	Obertraun	Austria	7+4	
13	1970	Teesside	England	7+2	
14	1971	Ostend	Belgium	6+4	
15	1972	Vejle	Denmark	7+0	
16	1973	Athens	Greece	7+0	
17	1974	Göppingen	West Germany	7+4	
18	1975	Zagreb	Yugoslavia	7+4	
19	1976	Mödling	Austria	7+4	
20	1977	Vichy	France	7+4	
21	1978	Barcelona	Spain	7+4	
22	1979	Rome	Italy	7+4	
23	1980	Poland	Polish People's Republic	7+4	
24	1981	Topolcany	Czechoslovakia	7+4	
25	1982	Hollabrunn	Austria	7+4	
26	1983	Malmö	Sweden	7+6	
27	1984	Linz	Austria	7+6	
28	1985	The Hague	Netherlands	7+6	
29	1986	Louvain-la-Neuve	Belgium	7+6	
30	1987	Athens	Greece	7+7	
31	1988	Novi Sad	Yugoslavia	7+7	
32	1989	Luxembourg	Luxembourg	7+7	
33	1990	Hollabrunn	Austria	7+7	
34	1991	Granada	Spain	7+7	
35	1992	Topolcany	Czechoslovakia	7+7	
36	1993	Ljubljana	Slovenia	7+7	
37	1994	Paris	France	7+7	
38	1995	The Hague	Netherlands	7+7	
39	1996	Frýdek-Místek	Czech Republic	7+7	
40	1997	Topolcany	Slovakia	7+7	
41	1998	Norcia	Italy	7+7	
42	1999	Frýdek-Místek	Czech Republic	7+7	
43	2000	Bratislava	Slovakia	7+7	
44	2001	Terni	Italy	7+7	
45	2002	Moscow	Russia	7+7	
46	2003	Novi Sad	Serbia	7+7	
47	2004	Budapest	Hungary	7+7	
48	2005	Prague	Czech Republic	7+7	
49	2006	Sarajevo	BIH	7+7	
50	2007	Bratislava	Slovakia	7+7	
51	2008	Terni	Italy	7+7	
52	2009	Prague	Czech Republic	7+7	
53	2010	Istanbul	Turkey	7+7	
54	2011	Kazan	Russia	7+7	
55	2012	Schwechat	Austria	7+7	
56	2013	Ostrava	Czech Republic	7+7	
57	2014	Riva del Garda	Italy	7+7	
58	2015	Bratislava	Slovakia	7+7	
59	2016	Zagreb	Croatia	7+7	
60	2017	Guimarães	Portugal	7+7	
61	2018	Cluj Napoca	Romania	7+7	
62	2019	Ostrava	Czech Republic	7+7	
63	2022	Belgrade	Serbia	7+7	

=== European Veterans Table Tennis Championships ===
- Because of lack of participants in some of events from 1995 to 2005, some of events were not held.
- Events (4) : MS/WS/MD/WD
- Age groups (8) (40 to 90 years old) : 40+/50+/60+/65+/70+/75+/80+/85+

Edition	Year	Host City	Host Country	Events
1	1995	Vienna	Austria	20
2	1997	Prague	Czech Republic	26
3	1999	Gothenburg	Sweden	27
4	2001	Aarhus	Denmark	28
5	2003	Courmayeur	Italy	29
6	2005	Bratislava	Slovakia	31
7	2007	Rotterdam	Netherlands	32
8	2009	Poreč	Croatia	32
9	2011	Liberec	Czech Republic	32
10	2013	Bremen	Germany	32
11	2015	Tampere	Finland	32
12	2017	Helsingborg	Sweden	32
13	2019	Budapest	Hungary	32
14	2021	Cardiff	Wales	32

== Winners ==
=== European Championships (1958–present) ===
Year	City	Team		Singles		Doubles		
Year	City	Men	Women	Men	Women	Men	Women	Mixed
1958	(Hungary) Budapest	Hungary	England	(Hungary) Zoltán Berczik	(Hungary) Éva Kóczián	(Czechoslovakia) Ladislav Štípek (Czechoslovakia) Ludvik Vyhnanovsky	(Romania) Angelica Rozeanu (Romania) Ella Zeller	(Hungary) Zoltán Berczik (Hungary) Gizi Farkas-Lantos
1960	(Socialist Federal Republic of Yugoslavia) Zagreb	Hungary (2)	Hungary	(Hungary) Zoltán Berczik (2)	(Hungary) Éva Kóczián (2)	(Hungary) Zoltán Berczik (Hungary) Ferenc Sido	(Romania) Angelica Rozeanu (2) (Romania) Maria Alexandru	(Romania) Gheorghe Cobirzan (Romania) Maria Alexandru
1962	(West Germany) Berlin	Yugoslavia	West Germany	(Sweden) Hans Alsér	(West Germany) Agnes Simon	(Socialist Federal Republic of Yugoslavia) Vojislav Marković (Socialist Federal Republic of Yugoslavia) Janez Teran	(England) Mary Shannon (England) Diane Rowe	(Sweden) Hans Alsér (West Germany) Inge Harst
1964	(Sweden) Malmö	Sweden	England (2)	(Sweden) Kjell Johansson	(Hungary) Eva Koczian	(Czechoslovakia) Jaroslav Stanek (Czechoslovakia) Vladimir Miko	(England) Mary Shannon (2) (England) Diane Rowe (2)	(Hungary) Péter Rózsás (Hungary) Sarolta Lukacs
1966	(England) London	Sweden (2)	Hungary (2)	(Sweden) Kjell Johansson (2)	(Romania) Maria Alexandru	(Sweden) Hans Alsér (Sweden) Kjell Johansson	(Hungary) Éva Kóczián (Hungary) Erzsebet Jurik-Heirits	(Czechoslovakia) Vladimir Miko (Czechoslovakia) Marta Luzová
1968	(France) Lyon	Sweden (3)	West Germany (2)	(Socialist Federal Republic of Yugoslavia) Dragutin Šurbek	(Czechoslovakia) Ilona Uhlikova-Vostova	(Socialist Federal Republic of Yugoslavia) Antun Stipančić (Socialist Federal Republic of Yugoslavia) Edvard Vecko	(Czechoslovakia) Marta Luzová (Czechoslovakia) Jitka Karliková	(Soviet Union) Stanislav Gomozkov (Soviet Union) Zoja Rudnova
1970	(Soviet Union) Moscow	Sweden (4)	Soviet Union	(Sweden) Hans Alsér (2)	(Soviet Union) Zoja Rudnova	(Socialist Federal Republic of Yugoslavia) Dragutin Šurbek (Socialist Federal Republic of Yugoslavia) Antun Stipančić (2)	(Soviet Union) Zoja Rudnova (Soviet Union) Svetlana Grinberg	(Soviet Union) Stanislav Gomozkov (2) (Soviet Union) Zoja Rudnova (2)
1972	(Netherlands) Rotterdam	Sweden (5)	Hungary (3)	(Sweden) Stellan Bengtsson	(Soviet Union) Zoja Rudnova (2)	(Hungary) István Jónyer (Hungary) Péter Rózsás	(Hungary) Judit Magos-Havas (Hungary) Henriette Lotaller	(Soviet Union) Stanislav Gomozkov (3) (Soviet Union) Zoja Rudnova (3)
1974	(Socialist Federal Republic of Yugoslavia) Novi Sad	Sweden (6)	Soviet Union (2)	(Czechoslovakia) Milan Orlowski	(Hungary) Judit Magos-Havas	(Hungary) István Jónyer (2) (Hungary) Tibor Klampár	(Hungary) Judit Magos-Havas(2) (Hungary) Henriette Lotaller (2)	(Soviet Union) Stanislav Gomozkov (4) (Soviet Union) Zoja Rudnova (4)
1976	(Czechoslovakia) Prague	Yugoslavia (2)	Soviet Union (3)	(France) Jacques Secrétin	(England) Jill Parker-Hammersley-Shirley	(Sweden) Stellan Bengtsson (Sweden) Kjell Johansson (2)	(England) Jill Parker-Hammersley-Shirley (England) Linda Jarvis-Howard	(Socialist Federal Republic of Yugoslavia) Antun Stipančić (Socialist Federal Republic of Yugoslavia) Erzebet Palatinus
1978	(West Germany) Duisburg	Hungary (3)	Hungary (4)	(Hungary) Gábor Gergely	(Hungary) Judit Magos-Havas (2)	(Czechoslovakia) Milan Orlowski (Hungary) Gábor Gergely	(Romania) Maria Alexandru (Romania) Liana Mihut	(West Germany) Wilfried Lieck (West Germany) Wiebke Hendriksen
1980	(Switzerland) Bern	Sweden (7)	Soviet Union (4)	(England) John Hilton	(Soviet Union) Valentina Popova	(France) Jacques Secrétin (France) Patrick Birocheau	(Soviet Union) Valentina Popova (Soviet Union) Narine Antonian	(Czechoslovakia) Milan Orlowski (Czechoslovakia) Ilona Uhlíková
1982	(Hungary) Budapest	Hungary (4)	Hungary (5)	(Sweden) Mikael Appelgren	(Netherlands) Bettine Vriesekoop	(Socialist Federal Republic of Yugoslavia) Zoran Kalinić (Socialist Federal Republic of Yugoslavia) Dragutin Šurbek	(Soviet Union) Fliura Abbate-Bulatova (Soviet Union) Inna Kovalenko	(Poland) Andrzej Grubba (Netherlands) Bettine Vriesekoop
1984	(Soviet Union) Moscow	France	Soviet Union (5)	(Sweden) Ulf Bengtsson	(Soviet Union) Valentina Popova (2)	(Socialist Federal Republic of Yugoslavia) Zoran Kalinić (2) (Socialist Federal Republic of Yugoslavia) Dragutin Šurbek (2)	(Soviet Union) Valentina Popova (2) (Soviet Union) Narine Antonian (2)	(France) Jacques Secrétin (Soviet Union) Valentina Popova
1986	(Czechoslovakia) Prague	Sweden (8)	Hungary (6)	(Sweden) Jörgen Persson	(Hungary) Csilla Bátorfi	(Sweden) Erik Lindh (Sweden) Jan-Ove Waldner	(Soviet Union) Fliura Abbate-Bulatova (2) (Soviet Union) Elena Kovtun	(Czechoslovakia) Jindřich Panský (Czechoslovakia) Marie Hrachová
1988	(France) Paris	Sweden (9)	Soviet Union (6)	(Sweden) Mikael Appelgren (2)	(Soviet Union) Fliura Abbate-Bulatova	(Sweden) Mikael Appelgren (Sweden) Jan-Ove Waldner (2)	(Hungary) Csilla Bátorfi (Hungary) Edit Urban	(Socialist Federal Republic of Yugoslavia) Ilija Lupulesku (Socialist Federal Republic of Yugoslavia) Jasna Fazlić (2)
1990	(Sweden) Gothenburg	Sweden (10)	Hungary (7)	(Sweden) Mikael Appelgren (3)	(Bulgaria) Daniela Guergueltcheva	(Socialist Federal Republic of Yugoslavia) Ilija Lupulesku (Socialist Federal Republic of Yugoslavia) Zoran Primorac	(Hungary) Csilla Bátorfi (2) (Hungary) Gabriella Wirth	(France) Jean-Philippe Gatien (France) Xiaoming Wang-Dréchou
1992	(Germany) Stuttgart	Sweden (11)	Romania	(Germany) Jörg Roßkopf	(Netherlands) Bettine Vriesekoop	(Sweden) Jörgen Persson (Sweden) Erik Lindh (2)	(Socialist Federal Republic of Yugoslavia) Jasna Fazlic (Socialist Federal Republic of Yugoslavia) Gordana Perkucin	(Greece) Kalinikos Kreanga (Romania) Otilia Badescu
1994	(England) Birmingham	France (2)	Russia (7)	(Belgium) Jean-Michel Saive	(Sweden) Marie Svensson	(Greece) Kalinikos Kreanga (Socialist Federal Republic of Yugoslavia) Zoran Kalinić (3)	(Hungary) Csilla Bátorfi (3) (Hungary) Krisztina Tóth	(Croatia) Zoran Primorac (Hungary) Csilla Bátorfi
1996	(Slovakia) Bratislava	Sweden (12)	Germany (3)	(Sweden) Jan-Ove Waldner	(Germany) Nicole Struse	(Sweden) Jan-Ove Waldner (3) (Sweden) Jörgen Persson (2)	(Germany) Nicole Struse (Germany) Elke Schall	(Belarus) Vladimir Samsonov (Hungary) Krisztina Tóth
1998	(Netherlands) Eindhoven	France (3)	Germany (4)	(Belarus) Vladimir Samsonov	(Luxembourg) Ni Xialian	(Belarus) Vladimir Samsonov (Germany) Jörg Roßkopf	(Germany) Nicole Struse (2) (Germany) Elke Schall (2)	(Serbia and Montenegro) Ilija Lupulesku (Romania) Otilia Badescu
2000	(Germany) Bremen	Sweden (13)	Hungary (8)	(Sweden) Peter Karlsson	(Germany) Qianhong Gotsch-He	(France) Patrick Chila (France) Jean-Philippe Gatien	(Hungary) Csilla Bátorfi (Hungary) Krisztina Tóth (2)	(Serbia and Montenegro) Aleksandar Karakašević (Lithuania) Rūta Paškauskienė
2002	(Croatia) Zagreb	Sweden (14)	Romania (2)	(Germany) Timo Boll	(Luxembourg) Ni Xialian (2)	(Germany) Zoltan Fejer-Konnerth (Germany) Timo Boll	(Croatia) Tamara Boroš (Romania) Mihaela Steff	(Poland) Lucjan Blaszczyk (Luxembourg) Ni Xialian
2003	(Italy) Courmayeur	Belarus	Italy	(Belarus) Vladimir Samsonov (2)	(Romania) Otilia Badescu (2)	(Austria) Chen Weixing (Belarus) Evgueni Chtchetinine (2)	(Croatia) Tamara Boroš (2) (Romania) Mihaela Steff (2)	(Austria) Werner Schlager (Hungary) Krisztina Tóth
2005	(Denmark) Aarhus	Denmark	Romania (3)	(Belarus) Vladimir Samsonov (3)	(Austria) Liu Jia	(Austria) Werner Schlager (Austria) Karl Jindrak	(Croatia) Tamara Boroš (3) (Romania) Mihaela Steff (3)	(Serbia and Montenegro) Aleksandar Karakašević (2) (Lithuania) Rūta Paškauskienė (2)
2007	(Serbia) Belgrade	Germany (1)	Hungary (9)	(Germany) Timo Boll (2)	(Netherlands) Li Jiao	(Germany) Timo Boll (2) (Germany) Christian Süß	(Belarus) Viktoria Pavlovich (Russia) Svetlana Ganina	(Serbia) Aleksandar Karakašević (3) (Lithuania) Rūta Paškauskienė (3)
2008	(Russia) Saint Petersburg	Germany (2)	Netherlands	(Germany) Timo Boll (3)	(Lithuania) Rūta Paškauskienė	(Germany) Timo Boll (3) (Germany) Christian Süß (2)	(Hungary) Krisztina Tóth (3) (Hungary) Georgina Póta	Not held
2009	(Germany) Stuttgart	Germany (3)	Netherlands (2)	(Denmark) Michael Maze	(Germany) Wu Jiaduo	(Germany) Timo Boll (4) (Germany) Christian Süß (3)	(Romania) Elizabeta Samara (Romania) Daniela Dodean	Held in separate championships
2010	(Czech Republic) Ostrava	Germany (4)	Netherlands (3)	(Germany) Timo Boll (4)	(Belarus) Viktoria Pavlovich	(Germany) Timo Boll(5) (Germany) Christian Süß(4)	(Lithuania) Rūta Paškauskienė (Russia) Oksana Fadeyeva	Held in separate championships
2011	(Poland) Gdańsk–Sopot	Germany (5)	Netherlands (4)	(Germany) Timo Boll (5)	(Netherlands) Li Jiao (2)	(Portugal) Marcos Freitas (Croatia) Andrej Gacina	(Lithuania) Rūta Paškauskienė (2) (Russia) Oksana Fadeyeva (2)	Held in separate championships
2012	(Denmark) Herning	Not held		(Germany) Timo Boll (6)	(Belarus) Viktoria Pavlovich (2)	(Austria) Robert Gardos (Austria) Daniel Habesohn	(Romania) Elizabeta Samara (2) (Romania) Daniela Dodean (2)	Held in separate championships
2013	(Austria) Schwechat	Germany (6)	Germany (5)	(Germany) Dimitrij Ovtcharov	(Sweden) Li Fen	(Poland) Wang Zengyi (Croatia) Tan Ruiwu	(Germany) Petrissa Solja (Germany) Sabine Winter	Held in separate championships
2014	(Portugal) Lisbon	Portugal	Germany (6)	Not held				
2015	(Russia) Yekaterinburg	Austria	Germany (7)	(Germany) Dimitrij Ovtcharov (2)	(Romania) Elizabeta Samara	(Austria) Stefan Fegerl (Portugal) João Monteiro	(Turkey) Melek Hu (Spain) Shen Yanfei	Not held
2016	(Hungary) Budapest	—		(France) Emmanuel Lebesson	(Turkey) Melek Hu	(Denmark) Jonathan Groth (Germany) Patrick Franziska	(Germany) Kristin Silbereisen (Germany) Sabine Winter (2)	(Portugal) João Monteiro (Romania) Daniela Monteiro Dodean
2017	Luxembourg	Germany (7)	Romania (3)	—				
2018	(Spain) Alicante	—		(Germany) Timo Boll (7)	(Poland) Li Qian	(Austria) Robert Gardos (2) (Austria) Daniel Habesohn (2)	(Germany) Nina Mittelham (Germany) Kristin Lang	(Germany) Han Ying (Germany) Ruwen Filus
2019	(France) Nantes	Germany (8)	Romania (4)	—				
2020	(Poland) Warsaw	—		(Germany) Timo Boll (8)	(Germany) Petrissa Solja	(Russia) Lev Katsman (Russia) Maksim Grebnev	(Germany) Petrissa Solja (2) (Germany) Shan Xiaona	(Germany) Dang Qiu (Germany) Nina Mittelham
2021	(Romania) Cluj Napoca	Germany (9)	Germany (8)	—				
2022	(Germany) Munich	—		(Germany) Dang Qiu	(Austria) Sofia Polcanova	(Sweden) Mattias Falck (Sweden) Kristian Karlsson	(Austria) Sofia Polcanova (Romania) Bernadette Szőcs	(France) Emmanuel Lebesson (France) Jia Nan Yuan
2023	(Sweden) Malmö	Sweden (15)	Germany (9)	—				
2024	(Austria) Linz	—		(France) Alexis Lebrun	(Austria) Sofia Polcanova (2)	(France) Alexis Lebrun (France) Félix Lebrun	(Czech Republic) Hana Matelová (Slovakia) Barbora Balážová	(Spain) María Xiao (Spain) Álvaro Robles
2025	(Croatia) Zagreb	France (4)	Germany (10)	—				

=== European Mixed Doubles Championships (2009–2013) ===
Year	City	Doubles
2009	(Serbia) Subotica	(Serbia) Aleksandar Karakašević (4) (Lithuania) Rūta Paškauskienė (4)
2010	(Serbia) Subotica	(Turkey) Bora Vang (Turkey) Şirin He
2011	(Turkey) Istanbul	(Romania) Andrei Filimon (Romania) Elizabeta Samara
2012	(Romania) Buzău	(Romania) Andrei Filimon (2) (Romania) Elizabeta Samara (2)
2013	(Romania) Buzău	(Czech Republic) Antonín Gavlas (Czech Republic) Renáta Štrbíková

== Performance by nations in team competition (1958–2023) ==
https://it.wikipedia.org/wiki/Campionati_europei_a_squadre_di_tennistavolo

bronze medals not complete

=== Men ===
Rank	Nation	Gold	Silver	Bronze	Total
1	Sweden	15	5	3	23
2	Germany	9	8	0	17
3	France	4	2	4	10
4	Hungary	4	1	0	5
5	Yugoslavia	2	3	3	8
6	Belarus	1	2	2	5
6	Portugal	1	2	2	5
8	Austria	1	1	3	5
9	Denmark	1	0	1	2
10	Poland	0	3	3	6
11	Russia	0	3	1	4
12	England	0	3	0	3
13	Czechoslovakia	0	2	0	2
14	Croatia	0	1	1	2
15	Greece	0	1	0	1
16	Belgium	0	0	1	1
16	Czech Republic	0	0	1	1
16	Romania	0	0	1	1
16	Slovenia	0	0	1	1
Totals (19 entries)		38	37	27	102

=== Women ===
Rank	Nation	Gold	Silver	Bronze	Total
1	Germany	9	6	2	17
1	Hungary	9	6	2	17
3	Russia	7	4	3	14
4	Romania	5	7	2	14
5	Netherlands	4	1	1	6
6	England	2	3	0	5
7	Italy	1	0	0	1
8	Czechoslovakia	0	4	0	4
9	Croatia	0	2	3	5
10	Poland	0	1	3	4
11	Portugal	0	1	2	3
12	Yugoslavia	0	1	1	2
13	Austria	0	1	0	1
14	Czech Republic	0	0	3	3
15	Belarus	0	0	2	2
15	France	0	0	2	2
17	Sweden	0	0	1	1
17	Ukraine	0	0	1	1
Totals (18 entries)		37	37	28	102

== Medals ==
=== Seniors ===
Source:

== See also ==
- World Table Tennis Championships
- Europe Top-16
- European Under-21 Table Tennis Championships
- European Youth Table Tennis Championships
- European Para Table Tennis Championships

== Results ==
- https://results.ettu.site/
- https://tt-wiki.info/
- https://tt-wiki.info/jugend-em/
- https://tt-wiki.info/u21-em/
- https://tt-wiki.info/senioren-em/
- https://tt-wiki.info/europa-meisterschaften/
- https://www.tt-kharkiv.com/en/tags/mediterranean-games/news
- https://www.ittf.com/2024/01/18/para-european-table-tennis-championship-to-return-to-helsingborg-in-2025/
- https://www.ettu.org/en/events/european-youth-championships/history---results---archive/2023/
- https://www.ettu.org/en/events/european-youth-championships/history---results---archive/
- https://www.ettu.org/en/n/news/2023/january/new-europe-youth-series-starts-/
- https://www.ettu.org/en/events/europe-youth-series/general-information/
- https://www.ettu.org/en/events/europe-youth-series/tuerkiye-open/
- https://www.ettu.org/en/events/europe-youth-series/history---archive/
- https://www.ettu.org/en/events/europe-youth-series/history---archive/2023/
