= Daniela Guergueltcheva =

Bulgarian table tennis player

Personal information
- Nationality: Bulgaria
- Born: 20 May 1964 (age 62) Momchilgrad, Bulgaria

Sport
- Sport: Table tennis
Medal record
Women's table tennis
Representing Bulgaria
European Championships
Gold medal – first place	1990 Gothenburg	Singles
Bronze medal – third place	1990 Gothenburg	Mixed Doubles

Daniela Guergueltcheva (Bulgarian: Даниела Гергелчева) (born 20 May 1964) is a former female table tennis player from Bulgaria. In 1990 she won two medals in singles and mixed double events in the Table Tennis European Championships. She has also been involved in coaching.

== Biography ==
Guergueltcheva began playing table tennis at the age of 7. She has been champion of Bulgaria on 11 occasions. Guergueltcheva participated in the 1988 (reaching the Round of 16) and 1992 (not advancing past the group stage in spite of winning 2 out of her 3 matches) Olympics. She has won three French championship titles with Montpellier TT and is also an honorary citizen of Montpellier.

She also won an English Open title.

Guergueltcheva is married and has a daughter studying law, named Inna. She is a cousin of Zdravko Zhelyazkov from the "Riton" duo.

== See also ==
- List of table tennis players
- List of World Table Tennis Championships medalists
