= Laima Balaišytė =

Lithuanian table tennis player (born 1948)

Laima Balaišytė (Amelin)
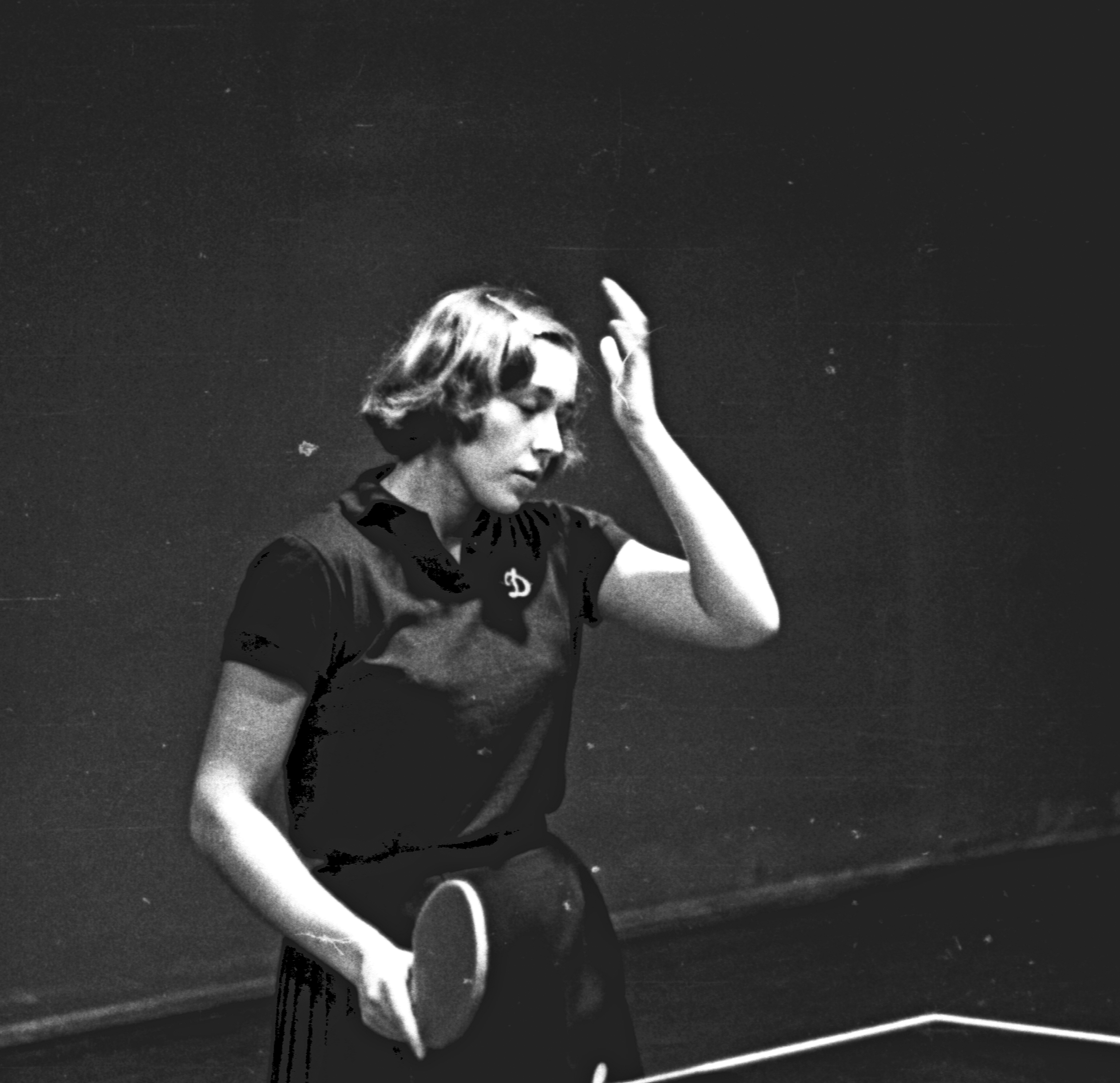
- Balaišytė-Amelina in 1971

Personal information
- Born: 3 January 1948 (age 78) Vilnius
- Spouse: Anatoly Amelin
Medal record
Women's table tennis
Representing Soviet Union
World Table Tennis Championships
Silver medal – second place	1967 Stockholm	Women's team
Gold medal – first place	1969 Munich	Women's team

Laima Balaišytė (married name Laima Amelin; born 3 January 1948) is a former international table tennis player from Lithuania.

== Table tennis career ==
She won a silver medal at the 1967 World Table Tennis Championships in the Corbillon Cup (women's team event) with Svetlana Grinberg, Signe Paisjärv and Zoja Rudnova for the Soviet Union.

Two years later she won the gold medal at the 1969 World Table Tennis Championships in the Corbillon Cup (women's team event) with Grinberg, Rudnova and Rita Pogosova for the Soviet Union.

She was the Soviet Union National Champion in 1962 and 1964.

== Personal life ==
She married fellow table tennis international Anatoly Amelin, living in Moscow.

== See also ==
- List of World Table Tennis Championships medalists
