= Satoru Kawahara =

Japanese table tennis player

Personal information
- Nationality: Japan
Medal record
Representing Japan
World Table Tennis Championships
Gold medal – first place	1967	Men's Team

Satoru Kawahara (河原 智, Kawahara Satoru) is a former international table tennis player from Japan.

He won a gold medal at the 1967 World Table Tennis Championships in the Swaythling Cup (men's team event) with Nobuhiko Hasegawa, Hajime Kagimoto, Koji Kimura and Mitsuru Kono for Japan.

== See also ==
- List of table tennis players
- List of World Table Tennis Championships medalists
