= Signe Paisjärv =

Estonian Soviet table tennis player

Personal information
- Nationality: Estonia
- Born: 31 May 1940 Tallinn
- Died: 10 June 2016 (aged 76) Tallinn
Medal record
Representing Soviet Union
World Table Tennis Championships
Silver medal – second place	1967	Women's Team

Signe Paisjärv (31 May 1940 – 10 June 2016) was a female former international table tennis player from Estonia.

== Table tennis career ==
She won a silver medal at the 1967 World Table Tennis Championships in the Corbillon Cup (women's team event) with Svetlana Grinberg, Laima Balaišytė and Zoja Rudnova for the Soviet Union.

She won 18 Estonian National titles: 10 gold (including the 1964 and 1967 singles), 3 silver and 5 bronze.

== Personal life ==
She married Jüri Talu in 1968.

== See also ==
- List of World Table Tennis Championships medalists
