= John Hilton (table tennis) =

British table tennis player

Personal information
- Full name: HILTON John
- Nationality: England
- Born: 25 June 1947 (age 79)

Sport
- Sport: Table tennis
Medal record
Men's table tennis
Representing England
European Championships
Gold medal – first place	1980 Berne	Singles
Silver medal – second place	1978 Duisburg	Team

John Hilton (born 25 June 1947) is a retired table tennis player best known for winning the singles event at the Table Tennis European Championships in 1980 despite being a relatively unknown amateur player. His use of a revolutionary combination bat with different rubbers on either side, coupled with his aggressive allround play, always turning the bat in his hand, led to one of sport's greatest upsets. At the time of his victory John trained at the Manchester YMCA, where he was only ranked at number 4, despite being ranked at number 1 in Europe and number 5 in the world. His odds of winning the tournament were rated at 1,000–1.

Ultimately, the table tennis authorities did change the rules because of Hilton, so that either side of a bat had different coloured rubbers. So the opposing player can very early spot which rubber their opponent was using and play hard attacks against the defensive opponent. Hilton used a bat which had black rubbers (one side joola antitopspin 2,5 mm with no grip and low speed, the other side very spinny and medium speed(Joola Stratos 1,5 mm)) on both sides, meaning that opponents generally had no clue which rubber he was using when he 'twiddled' his bat in mid-rally, especially when he played several balls backspin defense and then with the other side of the bat a high speed counter attack, so that the opponent couldn't reach the ball. Also he coupled the service with trampling the soles of his shoes on the floor at the moment of bat on ball impact to mask the slight difference in sound between the antispin and spinny surfaces. He also plays a lot of counter and topspin attacks with both hands and had the best leg action of the european players.

== Material and playing style ==
John Hilton used a custom table tennis blade produced by Joola, fitted with a high-spin rubber (Joola Stratos, 1.5 mm) on one side and an anti-topspin rubber on the other. During play, he frequently rotated the racket to vary between offensive and defensive styles. His approach included attacking serves and returns, while also demonstrating strong defensive capabilities, including the ability to return powerful topspin shots with low net clearance. He was also noted for executing effective smashes on forehand and backhand.

Hilton still plays table tennis in the Bolton league, which his team won in the 2012–13 season. John has won many Veteran titles; To date, he is the only British player to have won the gold medal in the Men's Singles event at the Table Tennis European Championships.

== See also ==
- List of England players at the World Team Table Tennis Championships
