= Bo Persson (table tennis) =

Swedish table tennis player

Personal information
- Nationality: Sweden
- Born: 1 January 1948 (age 78)
Medal record
Representing Sweden
World Table Tennis Championships
Bronze medal – third place	1967	Men's Team
Gold medal – first place	1973	Men's Team
Bronze medal – third place	1975	Men's Team

Bo Persson (born 1 January 1948) is a Swedish former international table tennis player.

== Table tennis career ==
He won a bronze medal at the 1967 World Table Tennis Championships in the Swaythling Cup (men's team event), a feat which he repeated eight years later at the 1975 World Table Tennis Championships.

In between the two bronze medals he recorded his greatest achievement by winning a gold medal in the Swaythling Cup (men's team event) at the 1973 World Table Tennis Championships as part of the Sweden team that contained Anders Johansson, Kjell Johansson, Stellan Bengtsson and Ingemar Wikström.

He also won four gold medals in the team event at the European Table Tennis Championships and played wearing spectacles. He later became a coach.

== See also ==
- List of table tennis players
- List of World Table Tennis Championships medalists
