= Kim Jung-sam =

North Korean table tennis player

Kim Jung-Sam
Personal information
- Native name: 김중삼
- Nationality: North Korea
Medal record
Representing North Korea
World Table Tennis Championships
Bronze medal – third place	1965	Men's Team
Silver medal – second place	1967	Men's Team

Kim Jung-Sam is a male former international table tennis player from North Korea.

He won a bronze medal at the 1965 World Table Tennis Championships in the Swaythling Cup (men's team event) with Jung Kil-Hwa, Jung Ryang-Woong, Kim Chang-Ho and Pak Sin Il.

Two years later he won a silver medal at the 1967 World Table Tennis Championships in the Swaythling Cup (men's team event) with Kang Neung-Hwa, Jung Ryang-Woong, Kim Chang-Ho and Pak Sin Il.

== See also ==
- List of table tennis players
- List of World Table Tennis Championships medalists
