= Dorin Giurgiuca =

Romanian table tennis player

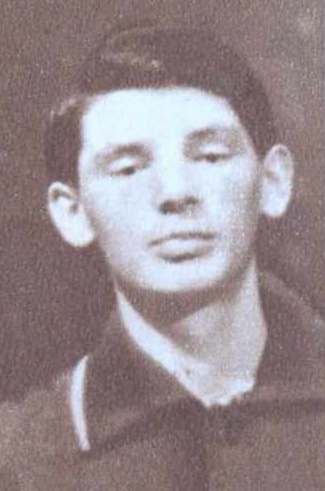
- Dorin Giurgiuca in 1965

Personal information
- Nationality: Romania
- Born: December 8, 1944
- Died: June 4, 2013
Medal record
Representing Romania
World Table Tennis Championships
Bronze medal – third place	1967	Mixed Doubles

Dorin Giurgiuca (December 8, 1944, Mihalț, Alba County, Romania - June 4, 2013) was a Romanian international table tennis player and coach.

== Table tennis career ==
Moving at a very young age with his family to Dej, he started playing table tennis when he was 14.

After he was discovered by Farkas Paneth, he joined CSM Cluj, where he stayed during all his active career, and with which he would win eleven national championships and five European Club Cup of Champions.

At the European Youth Championship in Bled, Yugoslavia, in 1962, he won a gold medal. In 1964, after winning the singles competition of the German, Austrian, and English Open tournaments, he was ranked second in Europe by the European Table Tennis Union.

A lefty and a master of the topspin, he became Romanian singles champion in 1967 and 1970.

A graduate of the Sports Academy in Cluj, after he retired from active play he became a coach.

He died of cirrhosis.

== Achievements ==
- national champion every year of his career in different competitions (1961-1974)
- twice national champion in the singles competition (1967, 1970)
- European youth champion (1962)
- Balkan Games champion in the singles, doubles and mixed competitions (1965)
- bronze medalist in the mixed competition (with Maria Alexandru, 1967 World Table Tennis Championships
- silver medalist at the European Championship, (with Maria Alexandru), France, 1968
- Winner of the English Open title.

== Awards ==
- Master of Sport, 1962
- Honored Master of Sport, 1994
