= Fliura Abbate-Bulatova =

Soviet-Italian table tennis player (born 1963)

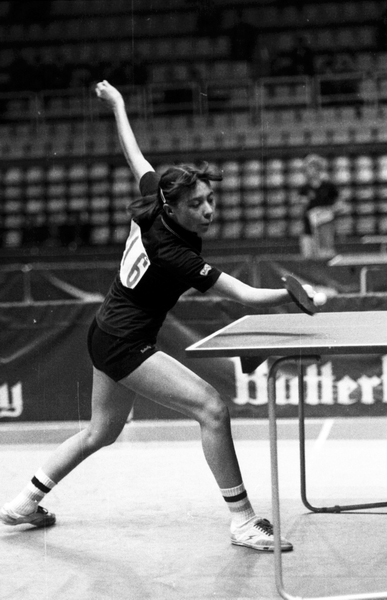

Personal information
- Full name: ABBATE-BULATOVA Fliura
- Nationality: Soviet Union Italy
- Born: 9 September 1963 (age 62) Oqtosh, Uzbek SSR, Soviet Union

Sport
- Sport: Table tennis
- Playing style: Shakehand grip
Medal record
Women's table tennis
European Championships
Representing Soviet Union
Gold medal – first place	1980 Berne	Team
Gold medal – first place	1982 Budapest	Doubles
Gold medal – first place	1984 Moscow	Women's Team
Gold medal – first place	1986 Prague	Doubles
Gold medal – first place	1988 Paris	Singles
Gold medal – first place	1988 Paris	Women's Team
Silver medal – second place	1984 Moscow	Singles
Silver medal – second place	1986 Prague	Singles
Silver medal – second place	1986 Prague	Women's Team
Silver medal – second place	1988 Paris	Doubles
Friendship Games
Bronze medal – third place	1984 Moscow	Women's doubles

Fliura Askarovna Abbate-Bulatova (Russian: Флюра Аскаровна Аббате-Булатова, born 9 September 1963) is a former Soviet and then Italian table tennis player. Born in 1963 in Uzbekistan, then part of USSR, her main achievement has been the gold medal in the single competition at the Table Tennis European Championships in 1988. She won several other medals in international competitions. She is also a multiple USSR National champion - twice in singles, three times in doubles and once in mixed doubles.

== See also ==
- List of table tennis players
