= Hajime Kagimoto =

Japanese table tennis player

Personal information
- Nationality: Japan
- Born: 1945 (age 80–81)
Medal record
Representing Japan
World Table Tennis Championships
Gold medal – first place	1967	Men's Team

Hajime Kagimoto (鍵本 肇, Kagimoto Hajime) is a former international table tennis player from Japan.

He won a gold medal at the 1967 World Table Tennis Championships in the Swaythling Cup (men's team event) with Nobuhiko Hasegawa, Satoru Kawahara, Koji Kimura and Mitsuru Kono for Japan.

== See also ==
- List of table tennis players
- List of World Table Tennis Championships medalists
