= Kang Neung-hwa =

North Korean table tennis player

Kang Neung-Hwa
Personal information
- Nationality: North Korea
Medal record
Representing North Korea
World Table Tennis Championships
Silver medal – second place	1967	Men's Team

Kang Neung-Hwa is a male former international table tennis player from North Korea.

He won a silver medal at the 1967 World Table Tennis Championships in the Swaythling Cup (men's team event) with Kim Jung-Sam, Jung Ryang-Woong, Kim Chang-Ho and Pak Sin Il.

== See also ==
- List of table tennis players
- List of World Table Tennis Championships medalists
