= Stanislav Gomozkov =

Soviet table tennis player

Personal information
- Full name: Stanislav Gomozkov
- Nationality: Soviet Union
- Born: 3 August 1948 (age 77) Asipovichy, Byelorussian SSR, Soviet Union
- Height: 183 cm (6 ft 0 in)

Sport
- Sport: Table tennis
- Playing style: Right-handed, shakehand grip
- Highest ranking: 5 (1967)
Medal record
Men's table tennis
Representing Soviet Union
Event	1st	2nd	3rd
World Championships	1	1	1
European Championships	4	2	7
Total	5	3	8
World Championships
Gold medal – first place	1975 Calcutta	Mixed
Silver medal – second place	1967 Stockholm	Doubles
Bronze medal – third place	1969 Munich	Doubles
European Championships
Gold medal – first place	1968 Lyon	Mixed
Gold medal – first place	1970 Moscow	Mixed
Gold medal – first place	1972 Rotterdam	Mixed
Gold medal – first place	1974 Novi Sad	Mixed
Silver medal – second place	1966 London	Team
Silver medal – second place	1970 Moscow	Team
Bronze medal – third place	1966 London	Doubles
Bronze medal – third place	1968 Lyon	Doubles
Bronze medal – third place	1970 Moscow	Doubles
Bronze medal – third place	1970 Moscow	Team
Bronze medal – third place	1974 Novi Sad	Doubles
Bronze medal – third place	1976 Prague	Mixed Doubles
Bronze medal – third place	1976 Prague	Team
European Youth Championships
Gold medal – first place	1965 Prague	Doubles
Gold medal – first place	1965 Prague	Team
Gold medal – first place	1966 Szombately	Singles
Gold medal – first place	1966 Szombately	Doubles
Gold medal – first place	1966 Szombately	Team
Bronze medal – third place	1965 Prague	Mixed Doubles

Stanislav Gomozkov (Russian: Станислав Николаевич Гомозков; born 3 August 1948) is a former male international table tennis player from the Soviet Union. At his peak, he was ranked 5th in the World Rankings.

== Career ==
=== Junior success ===
Gomozkov began playing table tennis at the age of 11. In 1965, he won his first USSR champion's title at the age of 17. The same year, Gomozkov became the European Youth champion in Prague. A year later, he repeated his success in the Szombathely.

=== International career ===
In 1966, Gomozkov made his debut in the major tournaments and was a part of the Soviet Union team that won the silver medal at the European Championships team event. He also won a medal in the doubles event together with Anatoly Amelin. Since 1966, Gomozkov was a regular member of the Soviet team up until 1977 World Championships in Birmingham.

In total, Gomozkov won four World Championships medals including a gold medal in the Mixed Doubles event with Tatiana Ferdman at the World Table Tennis Championships in 1975. Gomozkov also was a 4-time European champion in mixed doubles event, winning four consecutive titles from 1968 to 1974. He competed in Europe Top-16 competition three times, with his best achievement being 5th place in 1972.

Gomozkov retired from the international arena after 1977 World Championships in Birmingham, where he finished a tournament in the Round of 32 after a loss to Czechoslovak star Milan Orlowski. The following year, he won his final medals at the Soviet Championships, reaching the singles finals, and then he switched to coaching career.

=== Accolades ===
On the professional tour circuit, Gomozkov won 5 singles and 16 doubles event titles, including seven English Open titles from 1967/68 to 1976/77, three men's singles, three men's double and one mixed double titles.

Gomozkov is one of the most successful players in the Soviet Championships history with a total of 16 gold medals. Only Sarkis Sarchayan has won more (26) medals.

== Personal life ==
In 1997, Gomozkov married the Soviet table tennis player Fliura Abbate-Bulatova. For many years, Gomozkov was her coach. He has two sons - Alexander and Dmitriy.

== See also ==
- List of table tennis players
- List of World Table Tennis Championships medalists
- List of European Table Tennis Championships medalists
