= Erzsebet Jurik =

Hungarian table tennis player

Personal information
- Nationality: Hungary
- Born: 7 November 1938 (age 87)
Medal record
Representing Hungary
World Table Tennis Championships
| Bronze medal – third place | 1963 | Women's team |
| Bronze medal – third place | 1967 | Women's doubles |
| Bronze medal – third place | 1967 | Women's team |

Erzsebet Jurik is a female Hungarian former international table tennis player.

== Table tennis career ==
She won three bronze medals at the World Table Tennis Championships; two in the Corbillon Cup (women's team event) and one in the women's doubles with Éva Kóczián.

== See also ==
- List of table tennis players
- List of World Table Tennis Championships medalists
