= Stellan Bengtsson =

Swedish table tennis player

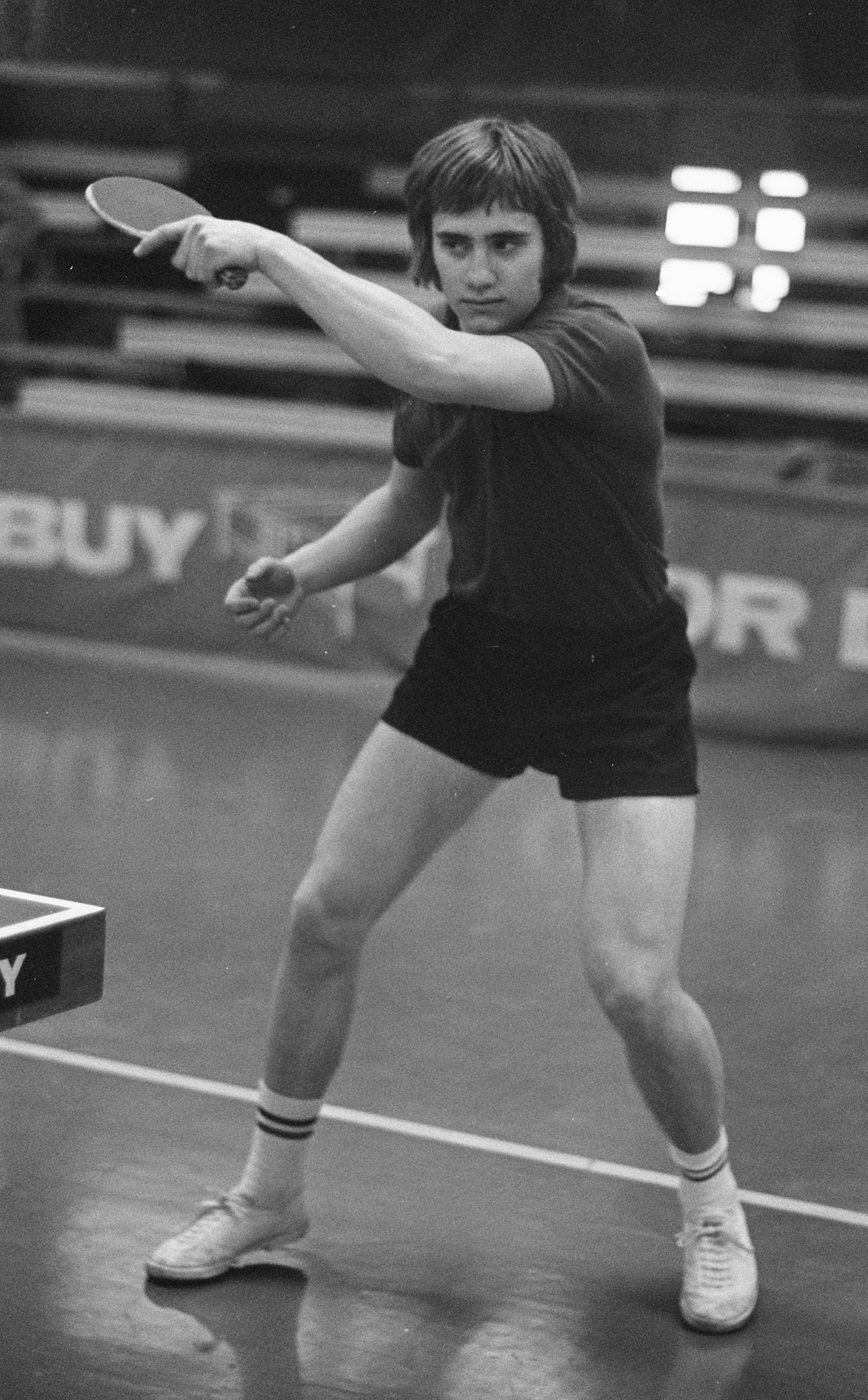
- Stellan Bengtsson (1972)

Personal information
- Full name: Stellan Bengtsson
- Nationality: Sweden
- Born: 26 July 1952 (age 74) Falkenberg, Sweden

Sport
- Sport: Table tennis
- Playing style: Shake hand grip
- Highest ranking: 1. 1, 1971
Medal record
Men's table tennis
Representing Sweden
World Championships
Silver medal – second place	1983 Tokyo	Team
Bronze medal – third place	1981 Novi Sad	Singles
Bronze medal – third place	1977 Birmingham	Doubles
Bronze medal – third place	1977 Birmingham	Team
Bronze medal – third place	1975 Calcutta	Team
Gold medal – first place	1973 Sarajevo	Doubles
Gold medal – first place	1973 Sarajevo	Team
Gold medal – first place	1971 Nagoya	Singles
European Championships
Bronze medal – third place	1980 Berne	Singles
Gold medal – first place	1980 Berne	Team
Gold medal – first place	1976 Prague	Doubles
Silver medal – second place	1976 Prague	Team
Silver medal – second place	1974 Novi Sad	Doubles
Gold medal – first place	1974 Novi Sad	Team
Gold medal – first place	1972 Rotterdam	Singles
Silver medal – second place	1972 Rotterdam	Doubles
Silver medal – second place	1972 Rotterdam	Mixed Doubles
Gold medal – first place	1972 Rotterdam	Team
Bronze medal – third place	1970 Moscow	Singles
Gold medal – first place	1970 Moscow	Team
Gold medal – first place	1968 Lyon	Team

Stellan Bengtsson (born 26 July 1952) is a Swedish former table tennis player. He became the first Swede to win the men's singles at the 1971 World Table Tennis Championships. He has won three World championships, seven European championships and 65 International championships.

He also won seven English Open titles.

== Notable events ==
First Swede to win World Championships

Bengtsson was born in Falkenberg, on the West coast of Sweden in 1952 and began to play table tennis at the age of eight. His small stature (167 cm tall, weighing 60 kg) helped him match the Chinese and he became the first Swede to win the individual World Championships in 1971. In total, Bengtsson has no less than 10 World Championship - and 13 European Championship medals to his credit. Because of his world championship, Bengtsson earned the Svenska Dagbladet Gold Medal.

Statue Raised in Bengtsson's Honor

It was three Rotary clubs, Falkenbergs Rotaryclub, Falkenberg-Herting Rotaryclub and Falkenberg-Kattegatt Rotaryclub, who originally launched the proposal in autumn 2003 and Bengtsson naturally gladly accepted. Stellan Bengtsson's contribution to the world of table tennis was immortalized when a bronze statue of the legendary Swede was raised in his hometown, Falkenberg, in 2006. Half a million Swedish kronor was raised from various sponsors and a local artist, Martina Falkehag Finn, was chosen amongst a number of qualified candidates to complete the project. The statue is located in the Falkenberg city hall and will be moved to Falkenberg's new athletic arena when the new indoor stadium is completed in a couple of years. Stellan Bengtsson currently teaches in After School Learning Tree in San Diego, California. He coaches kids and others to play.

Preceded by Gunnar Larsson	Svenska Dagbladet Gold Medal; 1971	Succeeded by Ulrika Knape
