= Anatoly Amelin =

Soviet table tennis player (born 1946)

Personal information
- Nationality: Soviet Union
- Born: 8 June 1946 (age 80)
Medal record
Representing Soviet Union
World Table Tennis Championships
Bronze medal – third place	1967	mixed doubles
Silver medal – second place	1967	men's doubles
Bronze medal – third place	1969	men's doubles

Anatoly Nikolayevich Amelin is a former international table tennis player from the Soviet Union.

== Table tennis career ==
He won three World Championship medals at the World Table Tennis Championships. A mixed doubles bronze medal with Zoja Rudnova and a silver medal and bronze with Stanislav Gomozkov in the men's doubles.

He also won an English Open title.

== Personal life ==
He married fellow table tennis international Laima Balaišytė.

== See also ==
- List of World Table Tennis Championships medalists
