= Sarolta Lukacs =

Hungarian table tennis player

Sarolta Lukacs (née Mathe)
Personal information
- Nationality: Hungary
Medal record
Representing Hungary
World Table Tennis Championships
Bronze medal – third place	1963	Women's team
Bronze medal – third place	1967	Women's team

Sarolta Lukacs (née Mathe) is a female Hungarian former international table tennis player.

== Table tennis career ==
She won two bronze medals at the World Table Tennis Championships, in the Corbillon Cup (women's team event).

== See also ==
- List of table tennis players
- List of World Table Tennis Championships medalists
