= Jaroslav Staněk =

Czech table tennis player

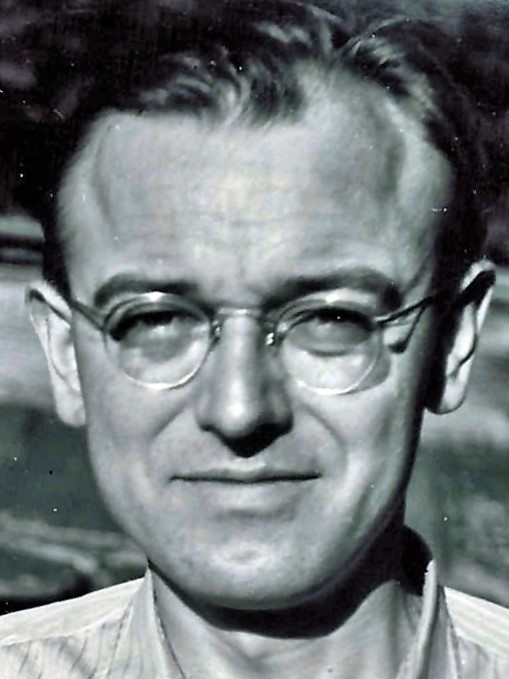

Personal information
- Nationality: Czechoslovakia
- Born: 24 February 1940 (age 86)
Medal record
Representing Czechoslovakia
World Table Tennis Championships
Bronze medal – third place	1967	doubles

Jaroslav Staněk (born 24 February 1940 in Opava-Podvihov) is a former male international table tennis player from Czechoslovakia.

== Table tennis career ==
He won a bronze medal at the 1967 World Table Tennis Championships in the Men's doubles event with Vladimir Miko.

== See also ==
- List of table tennis players
- List of World Table Tennis Championships medalists
