= Vladimír Miko =

Slovak table tennis player

Personal information
- Nationality: Slovakia
- Born: 22 March 1943 Krupina, Slovakia
- Died: 30 December 2017 (aged 74) Prague, Czech Republic
Medal record
Representing Czechoslovakia
World Table Tennis Championships
Bronze medal – third place	1967	doubles

Vladimír Miko (22 March 1943 – 30 December 2017) was a Slovak table tennis player.

== Table tennis career ==
He won a bronze medal at the 1967 World Table Tennis Championships with Jaroslav Staněk.

He started playing in 1951 and was coached by Ladislav Štípek and Ludvík Vyhnanovský. He played in five European Championships, reached a world ranking of 9 and retired in 1970.

He also won five English Open titles.

== Coaching ==
He was the national coach of Luxembourg from 1971 to 1973, and then the national coach for Czechoslovakia until 1990.

== See also ==
- List of table tennis players
- List of World Table Tennis Championships medalists
