= Kjell Johansson (table tennis) =

Swedish table tennis player

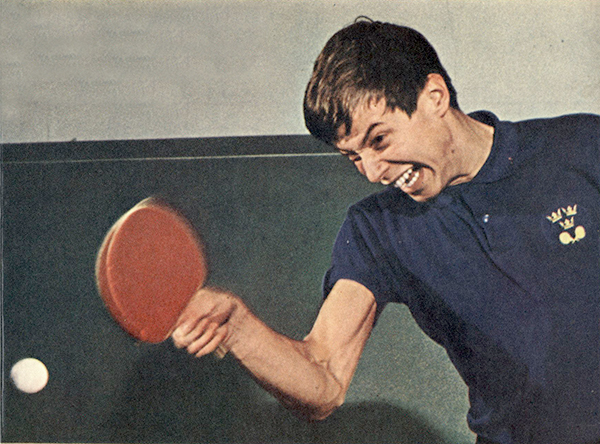
- Kjell Johansson 1966

Personal information
- Nationality: Sweden
- Born: 5 October 1946 Eskilstuna, Sweden
- Died: 24 October 2011 (aged 65) Eksjö, Sweden

Sport
- Sport: Table tennis
Medal record
Men's table tennis
Representing Sweden
World Championships
Bronze medal – third place	1977 Birmingham	Doubles
Bronze medal – third place	1977 Birmingham	Team
Bronze medal – third place	1975 Calcutta	Team
Silver medal – second place	1973 Sarajevo	Singles
Gold medal – first place	1973 Sarajevo	Doubles
Gold medal – first place	1973 Sarajevo	Team
Gold medal – first place	1969 Munich	Doubles
Gold medal – first place	1967 Stockholm	Doubles
Bronze medal – third place	1967 Stockholm	Team
Bronze medal – third place	1963 Prague	Team
European Championships
Gold medal – first place	1976 Prague	Doubles
Silver medal – second place	1976 Prague	Team
Bronze medal – third place	1974 Novi Sad	Singles
Silver medal – second place	1974 Novi Sad	Doubles
Gold medal – first place	1974 Novi Sad	Team
Silver medal – second place	1972 Rotterdam	Doubles
Gold medal – first place	1972 Rotterdam	Team
Bronze medal – third place	1970 Moscow	Singles
Silver medal – second place	1970 Moscow	Doubles
Gold medal – first place	1970 Moscow	Team
Bronze medal – third place	1968 Lyon	Singles
Silver medal – second place	1968 Lyon	Doubles
Gold medal – first place	1968 Lyon	Team
Gold medal – first place	1966 London	Singles
Gold medal – first place	1966 London	Doubles
Gold medal – first place	1966 London	Team
Gold medal – first place	1964 Malmo	Singles
Silver medal – second place	1964 Malmo	Doubles
Gold medal – first place	1964 Malmo	Team

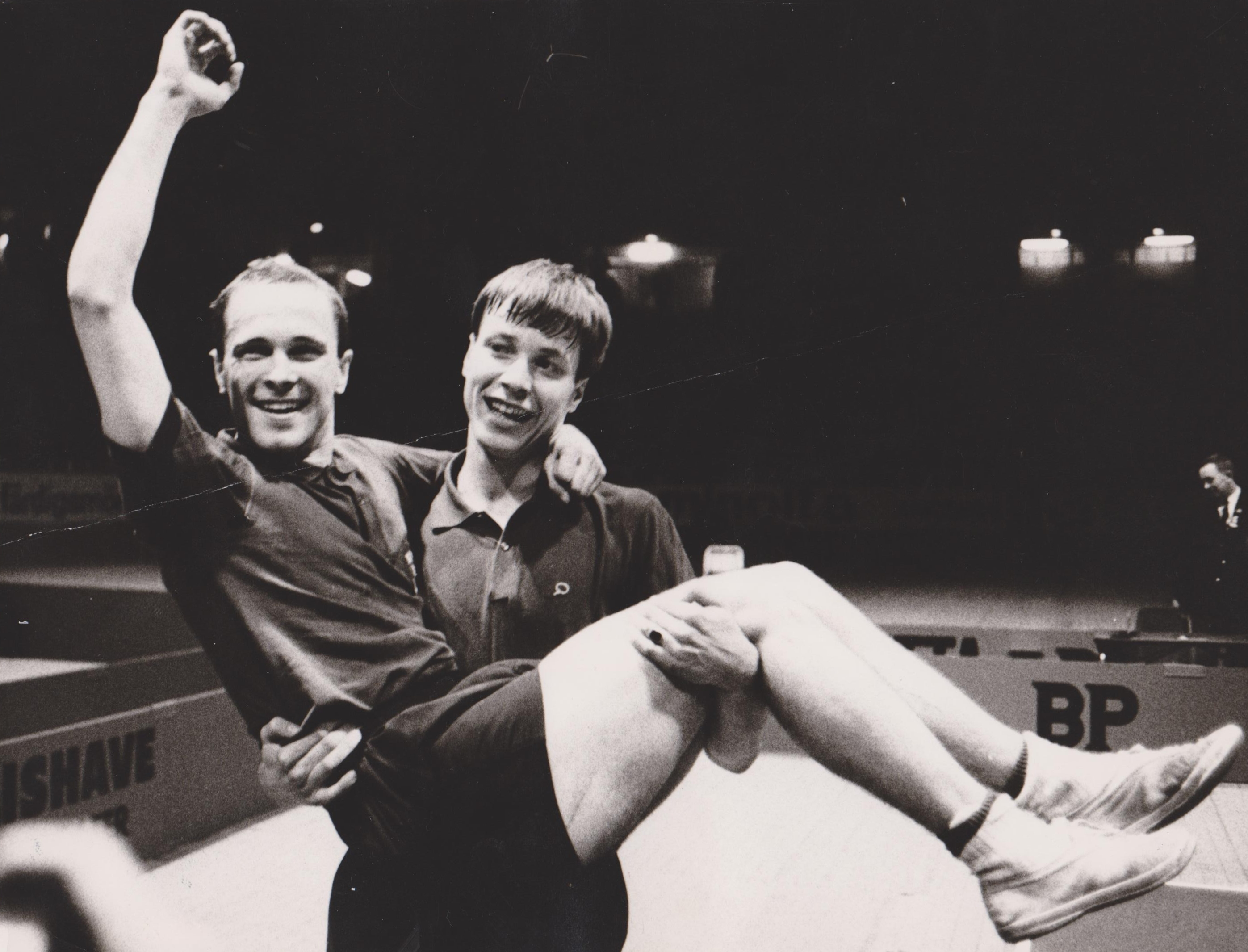
Kjell Johansson carrying his doubles partner Hans Alsér

Kjell Johansson (5 October 1946 – 24 October 2011) was a Swedish table tennis player.

From 1963 to 1977, he won several medals in singles, doubles, and team events in the European Table Tennis Championships and in the World Table Tennis Championships. He won the 1965 Svenska Dagbladet Gold Medal. He was a native of Eskilstuna.

He also won three English Open titles.

Johansson was called Hammaren, which means "The Hammer" in Swedish, because of his hard forehand. His brother Christer Johansson was also an international table tennis player.

Johansson died in Eksjö on 24 October 2011, aged 65, following a long illness.

== See also ==
- List of table tennis players
- List of World Table Tennis Championships medalists
