= Mitsuru Kono =

Japanese table tennis player

Mitsuru Kohno
Personal information
- Full name: KOHNO Mitsuru
- Nationality: Japan
- Born: 13 September 1946 (age 79)

Sport
- Sport: Table tennis
Medal record
Men's table tennis
Representing Japan
World Championships
| Gold medal – first place | 1977 Birmingham | Singles |
| Silver medal – second place | 1977 Birmingham | Team |
| Bronze medal – third place | 1975 Calcutta | Singles |
| Bronze medal – third place | 1973 Sarajevo | Team |
| Silver medal – second place | 1971 Nagoya | Team |
| Bronze medal – third place | 1969 Munich | Doubles |
| Silver medal – second place | 1969 Munich | Mixed Doubles |
| Gold medal – first place | 1969 Munich | Team |
| Silver medal – second place | 1967 Stockholm | Singles |
| Bronze medal – third place | 1967 Stockholm | Doubles |
| Gold medal – first place | 1967 Stockholm | Team |
Asian Championships
| Gold medal – first place | 1976 Pyongyang | Doubles |
| Silver medal – second place | 1976 Pyongyang | Team |
| Bronze medal – third place | 1974 Yokohama | Singles |
| Gold medal – first place | 1974 Yokohama | Doubles |
| Gold medal – first place | 1974 Yokohama | Mixed Doubles |
| Silver medal – second place | 1974 Yokohama | Team |
| Gold medal – first place | 1972 Beijing | Doubles |
| Silver medal – second place | 1972 Beijing | Mixed Doubles |
| Gold medal – first place | 1972 Beijing | Team |
| Bronze medal – third place | 1970 Nagoya | Doubles |
| Gold medal – first place | 1970 Nagoya | Team |
| Gold medal – first place | 1968 Jakarta | Singles |
| Silver medal – second place | 1968 Jakarta | Doubles |
| Gold medal – first place | 1968 Jakarta | Mixed Doubles |
| Gold medal – first place | 1968 Jakarta | Team |
| Silver medal – second place | 1967 Singapore | Singles |
| Gold medal – first place | 1967 Singapore | Doubles |
| Gold medal – first place | 1967 Singapore | Team |

Mitsuru Kohno (河野 満, Kōno Mitsuru; born September 13, 1946) is a former international table tennis player from Japan.

== Table tennis career ==
From 1967 to 1977 he won many medals in singles, doubles, and team events in the World Table Tennis Championships and in the Asian Table Tennis Championships.

The eleven World Championship medals included three gold medals in the men's singles at the 1977 World Table Tennis Championships and the men's team events at the 1967 World Table Tennis Championships and 1969 World Table Tennis Championships.

== See also ==
- List of table tennis players
- List of World Table Tennis Championships medalists
