= Zoja Rudnova =

Soviet table tennis player

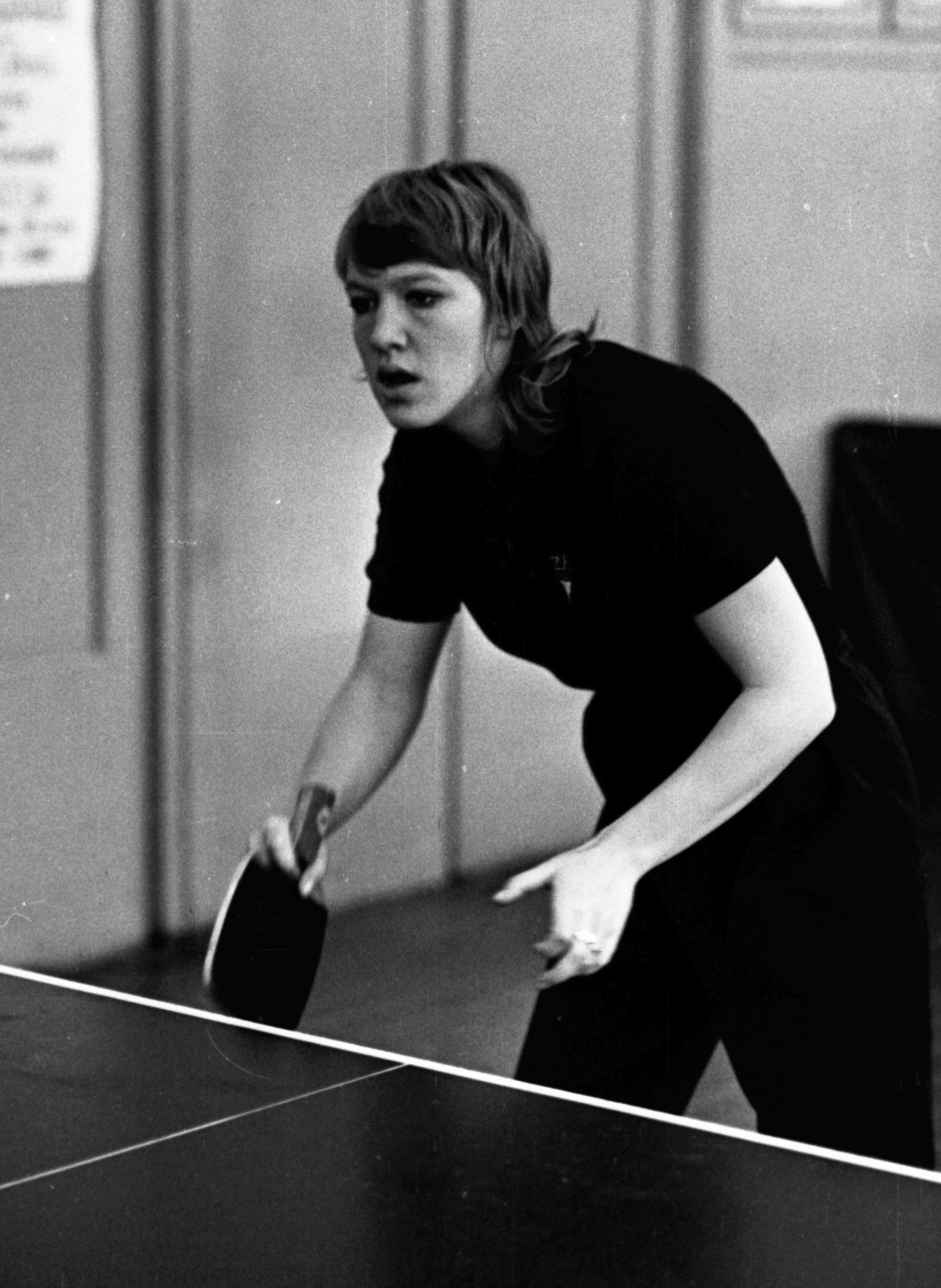

Personal information
- Full name: RUDNOVA Zoja
- Nationality: Soviet Union
- Born: 19 August 1946 Moscow
- Died: 12 March 2014 (aged 67) Moscow

Sport
- Sport: Table tennis
Medal record
Women's table tennis
Representing Soviet Union
World Championships
Gold medal – first place	1969 Munich	Doubles
Gold medal – first place	1969 Munich	Team
Bronze medal – third place	1967 Stockholm	Singles
Bronze medal – third place	1967 Stockholm	Doubles
Bronze medal – third place	1967 Stockholm	Mixed Doubles
Silver medal – second place	1967 Stockholm	Team
European Championships
Bronze medal – third place	1976 Prague	Mixed Doubles
Gold medal – first place	1976 Prague	Team
Bronze medal – third place	1974 Novi Sad	Singles
Bronze medal – third place	1974 Novi Sad	Doubles
Gold medal – first place	1974 Novi Sad	Mixed Doubles
Gold medal – first place	1974 Novi Sad	Team
Gold medal – first place	1972 Rotterdam	Singles
Bronze medal – third place	1972 Rotterdam	Doubles
Gold medal – first place	1972 Rotterdam	Mixed Doubles
Gold medal – first place	1970 Moscow	Singles
Gold medal – first place	1970 Moscow	Doubles
Gold medal – first place	1970 Moscow	Mixed Doubles
Gold medal – first place	1970 Moscow	Team
Silver medal – second place	1968 Lyon	Singles
Silver medal – second place	1968 Lyon	Doubles
Gold medal – first place	1968 Lyon	Mixed Doubles
Silver medal – second place	1968 Lyon	Team
Bronze medal – third place	1964 Malmo	Singles

Zoja Rudnova (19 August 1946 – 12 March 2014) was an international table tennis player from the former Soviet Union.

== Table tennis career ==
From 1964 to 1976 she won several medals in singles, doubles, and team events in the Table Tennis European Championships and in the World Table Tennis Championships. She was twice European champion in women singles, three time European champion with the USSR team, once in women doubles and four times in mixed doubles. She was the first woman ever to become an absolute European champion in 1970 winning all four possible gold medals (singles, team, doubles, mixed doubles) - great feat which has only been repeated once since.

She was a member of USSR women team who won gold medal at 1969 World Championships which was the only time USSR or Russia ever won gold medal as a team (she also has team silver medal from 1967 Worlds). She also has one of only two non-team world championship gold medals in table tennis ever won by USSR or Russia - in doubles in 1969 with Svetlana Grinberg.

She also won four English Open titles.

Zoja Rudnova died on 12 March 2014, at the age of 67.

== See also ==
- List of table tennis players
- List of World Table Tennis Championships medalists
