= Hans Alsér =

Swedish table tennis player (1942–1977)

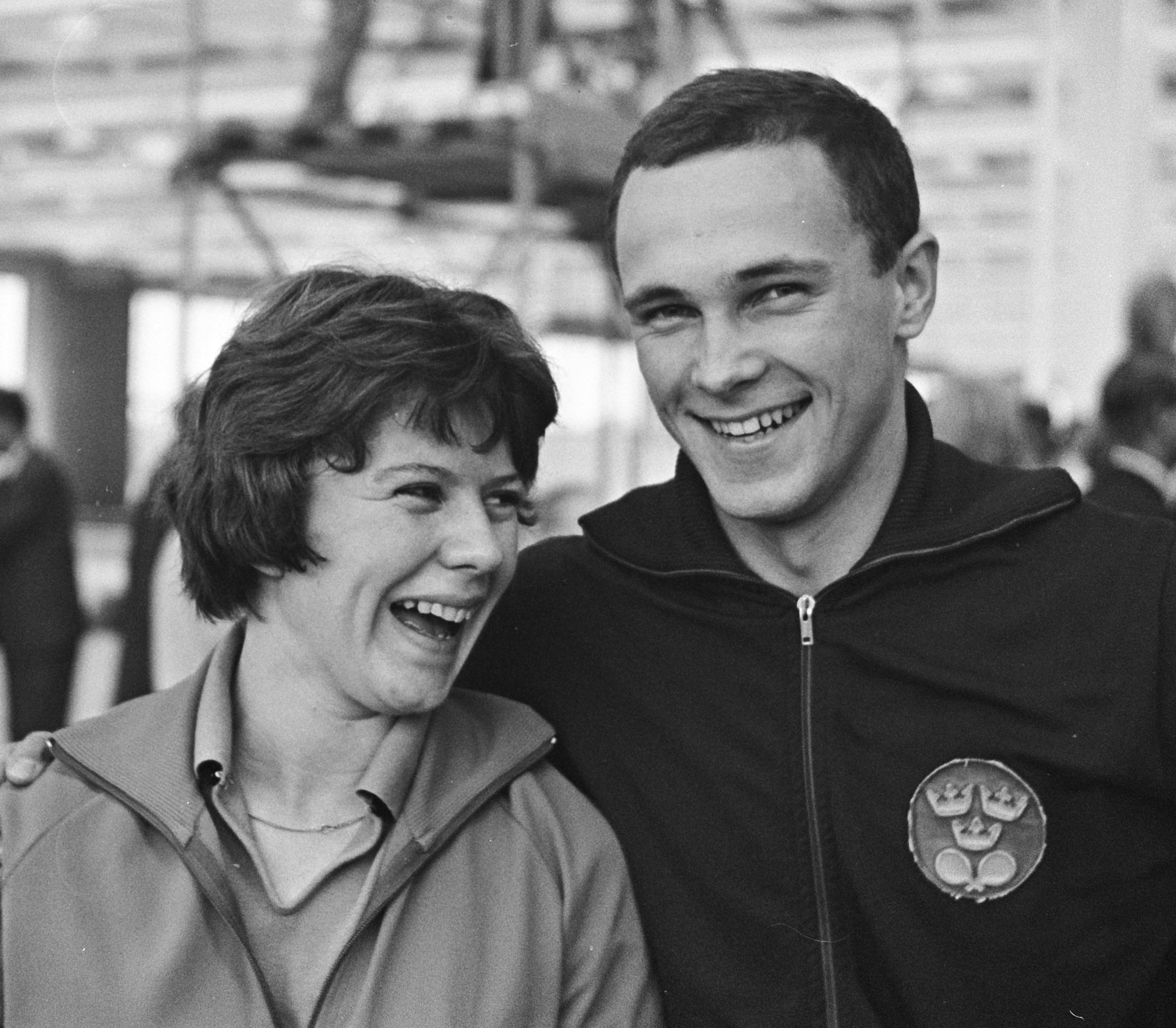
- Mary Shannon and Hans Alsér in Utrecht, the Netherlands, 1963

Personal information
- Full name: Hans Edward Alsér
- Born: 23 January 1942 Borås, Sweden
- Died: 15 January 1977 (aged 34) Stockholm, Sweden
- Height: 173 cm (5 ft 8 in)

Sport
- Sport: Table tennis
- Playing style: Shakehand, all-round attacker
- Highest ranking: 3 (1970)
Medal record
Men's table tennis
Representing Sweden
Event	1st	2nd	3rd
World Championships	2	0	3
European Championships	8	5	1
Total	10	5	4
World Championships
Gold medal – first place	1969 Munich	Doubles
Gold medal – first place	1967 Stockholm	Doubles
Bronze medal – third place	1967 Stockholm	Team
Bronze medal – third place	1963 Prague	Team
Bronze medal – third place	1959 Dortmund	Doubles
European Championships
Gold medal – first place	1970 Moscow	Singles
Gold medal – first place	1970 Moscow	Team
Gold medal – first place	1968 Lyon	Team
Gold medal – first place	1966 London	Doubles
Gold medal – first place	1966 London	Team
Gold medal – first place	1964 Malmö	Team
Gold medal – first place	1962 Berlin	Singles
Gold medal – first place	1962 Berlin	Mixed doubles
Silver medal – second place	1970 Moscow	Doubles
Silver medal – second place	1968 Lyon	Doubles
Silver medal – second place	1964 Malmö	Doubles
Silver medal – second place	1962 Berlin	Team
Silver medal – second place	1960 Zagreb	Team
Bronze medal – third place	1968 Lyon	Singles

Hans "Hasse" Alsér (23 January 1942 – 15 January 1977) was a Swedish international table tennis player and later the head coach of West German (1971–1974) and Swedish (1974–1977) national teams. At the peak of his career, Alser was ranked 3rd in the World Ranking.

== Table tennis career ==
Hans Alsér was an international top level player. He was the European champion (singles) 1962 and 1970, world champion (doubles) 1967 and 1969, and European champion (doubles) 1966.

Hans Alsér was Swedish singles champion six times. During the years 1960–1971 he played in the Swedish singles championship final every year. The years when he did not become the Swedish singles champion he was second placed. In 1967 he also became Swedish mixed-double champion with Eva Johansson.

He also won an English Open title.

His playing style was more all-round than most other players in the 1960s. He could attack close to the table but also defend far from the table. He mastered top-spin, chopping, looping and all other types of play.

Stiga (manufacturer of table tennis tables, rackets, rubber and balls) made a very popular racket with the Alsér-grip. It was thicker towards the end of the grip, decreasing the risk of the racket slipping out of the player's grip.

He died in 1977 at the age of 34 in the Linjeflyg Flight 618 plane crash at Kälvesta in Stockholm.

== See also ==
- List of table tennis players
- List of World Table Tennis Championships medalists
