= Beijing International Table Tennis Tournament =

Beijing International Table Tennis Tournament was a friendly table tennis tournament in Beijing (usually Peking at the time), China in 1964, 1965, and 1966 which was organized by Chinese Table Tennis Association.

== Medalists ==
=== Men's singles ===
Year	Gold	Silver	Bronze
1964	(China) Li Furong	(China) Xu Yinsheng	(Japan) Koji Kimura
1964	(China) Li Furong	(China) Xu Yinsheng	(China) Zhuang Zedong
1965	(China) Zhou Lansun	(Japan) Hajime Kagimoto	(Cambodia) Yang Chhor Nam
1965	(China) Zhou Lansun	(Japan) Hajime Kagimoto	(China) Yu Yize
1966	(China) Zhuang Zedong	(China) Li Furong	(China) Su Guoxi
1966	(China) Zhuang Zedong	(China) Li Furong	(China) Zhou Lansun

=== Women's singles ===
Year	Gold	Silver	Bronze
1964	(Japan) Naoko Fukatsu	(China) Han Yuzhen	(China) Di Qianghua
1964	(Japan) Naoko Fukatsu	(China) Han Yuzhen	(China) Zheng Minzhi
1965	(China) Li Li	(Japan) Sachiko Morisawa	(China) Li Henan
1965	(China) Li Li	(Japan) Sachiko Morisawa	(China) Liu Yaqin
1966	(China) Lin Huiqing	(China) Li Li	(Japan) Noriko Yamanaka
1966	(China) Lin Huiqing	(China) Li Li	(China) Zheng Minzhi

=== Men's doubles ===
Year	Gold	Silver	Bronze
1964	(China) Xu Yinsheng (China) Zhuang Zedong	(Japan) Koji Kimura (Japan) Ken Konaka	(North Korea) Jung Kil-hwa (North Korea) Jung Ryang-woong
1964	(China) Xu Yinsheng (China) Zhuang Zedong	(Japan) Koji Kimura (Japan) Ken Konaka	(China) Li Furong (China) Wang Jiasheng
1965	(China) Wang Jiasheng (China) Zhou Lansun	(China) Lu Jufang (China) Yu Yize	(Japan) Nobuhiko Hasegawa (Japan) Hajime Kagimoto
1965	(China) Wang Jiasheng (China) Zhou Lansun	(China) Lu Jufang (China) Yu Yize	(China) Li Jingguang (China) Wu Xiaoming
1966	(China) Li Furong (China) Lu Jufang	(China) Li Jingguang (China) Zhuang Zedong	(Japan) Manji Fukushima (Japan) Nobuhiko Hasegawa
1966	(China) Li Furong (China) Lu Jufang	(China) Li Jingguang (China) Zhuang Zedong	(China) Su Guoxi (China) Zhou Lansun

=== Women's doubles ===
Year	Gold	Silver	Bronze
1964	(Japan) Masako Seki (Japan) Noriko Yamanaka	(China) Han Yuzhen (China) Liang Lizhen	(China) Di Qianghua (China) Zheng Minzhi
1964	(Japan) Masako Seki (Japan) Noriko Yamanaka	(China) Han Yuzhen (China) Liang Lizhen	(Japan) Naoko Fukatsu (Japan) Chizuko Nakayama
1965	(China) Li Henan (China) Li Li	(Japan) Etsuko Kashiai (Japan) Sachiko Morisawa	(Indonesia) Ambar Maladi Lestari (China) Hu Yulan
1965	(China) Li Henan (China) Li Li	(Japan) Etsuko Kashiai (Japan) Sachiko Morisawa	(China) Lin Xiuying (China) Liu Yaqin
1966	(Japan) Naoko Fukatsu (Japan) Noriko Yamanaka	(China) Lin Huiqing (China) Zheng Minzhi	(Japan) Saeko Hirota (Japan) Sachiko Morisawa
1966	(Japan) Naoko Fukatsu (Japan) Noriko Yamanaka	(China) Lin Huiqing (China) Zheng Minzhi	(China) Li Henan (China) Li Li

=== Mixed doubles ===
Year	Gold	Silver	Bronze
1964	(Japan) Koji Kimura (Japan) Masako Seki	(China) Li Furong (China) Han Yuzhen	(Japan) Ken Konaka (Japan) Noriko Yamanaka
1964	(Japan) Koji Kimura (Japan) Masako Seki	(China) Li Furong (China) Han Yuzhen	(China) Zhuang Zedong (China) Liang Lizhen
1965	(China) Lu Jufang (China) Liu Yaqin	(Japan) Nobuhiko Hasegawa (Japan) Toku Masuyama	(China) Li Jingguang (China) Lin Xiuying
1965	(China) Lu Jufang (China) Liu Yaqin	(Japan) Nobuhiko Hasegawa (Japan) Toku Masuyama	(Japan) Kiyoharu Sugawara (Japan) Sachiko Morisawa
1966	(China) Li Jingguang (China) Li Henan	(China) Li Furong (China) Li Li	(Japan) Manji Fukushima (Japan) Sachiko Morisawa
1966	(China) Li Jingguang (China) Li Henan	(China) Li Furong (China) Li Li	(North Korea) Pak Sin-il (North Korea) Kim Jong-sil

=== Men's team ===
Year	Gold	Silver	Bronze
1965	China	North Korea	Japan
1966	China	Japan	North Korea

=== Women's team ===
Year	Gold	Silver	Bronze
1965	China	Japan	North Vietnam
1966	China	Japan	North Korea
