= All China Table Tennis Championships =

Biennial table tennis tournament

The All China Table Tennis Championships is a biennial table tennis tournament regarded as continental championships by China.

== Winners ==
| Year | Singles | | Doubles | | | Team | |
| Year | Men's | Women's | Men's | Women's | Mixed | Men's | Women's |
|---|---|---|---|---|---|---|---|
| 1952 | Jiang Yongning | Sun Meiying | | | | | |
| 1956 | Wang Chuanyao | Sun Meiying | | | | | |
| 1957 | Wang Chuanyao | Ye Peiqiong | Hu Bingquan; Wang Chuanyao | Deng Zhujun; Li Linshu | Zhuang Zedong; Zhang Baodi | Beijing; First Team | Beijing; First Team |
| 1958 | Rong Guotuan | Ye Peiqiong | Fu Qifang; Wang Chuanyao | Chi Huifang; Zhu Peimin | Wang Chuanyao; Sun Meiying | Shanghai; First Team | Shanghai; First Team |
| 1959* | Wang Chuanyao | Hu Keming | Jiang Yongning; Zhuang Jiafu | Qiu Zhonghui; Ye Peiqiong | Zhuang Zedong; Qiu Zhonghui | Shanghai | Beijing |
| 1960 | Wang Chuanyao | Qiu Zhonghui | Li Furong; Zhuang Zedong | Sun Meiying; Wang Jian | Zhuang Zedong; Qiu Zhonghui | | |
| 1961 | Li Furong | Qiu Zhonghui | Li Furong; Zhuang Zedong | Qiu Zhonghui; Wang Jian | Li Furong; Han Yuzhen | Shanghai; First Team | Heilongjiang; First Team |
| 1962 | Yang Ruihua | Qiu Zhonghui | Li Furong; Wang Jiasheng | Lin Ximeng; Zheng Minzhi | Hu Daoben; Liang Lizhen | | |
| 1963 | Zhang Xielin | Lin Huiqing | Xu Dawan; Wang Xuekun | Lin Huiqing; Zheng Minzhi | Yu Changchun; Zhou Yiling | Beijing | Beijing |
| 1964 | Zhuang Zedong | Han Yuzhen | Yu Changchun; Zhou Lansun | Han Yuzhen; Li Henan | Zhang Xielin; Lin Huiqing | | |
| 1965* | Zhuang Zedong | Lin Huiqing | Li Furong; Xu Yinsheng | Huang Yuhuan; Liang Lizhen | Lu Jufang; Liang Lizhen | Shanghai | Shanghai |
| 1966 | Zhuang Zedong | Qiu Baoqin | Li Jingguang; Zhuang Zedong | Li Henan; Li Li | Wang Jiasheng; Li Henan | Shanghai; First Team | Shanghai; First Team |
| 1972 | Diao Wenyuan | Hu Yulan | Diao Wenyuan; Li Jingguang | Feng Mengya; Zhu Naizhen | Li Deze; Hu Yulan | Hebei; First Team | Shanxi; First Team |
| 1973 | Li Zhenshi | Huang Xiping | Li Zhuomin; Liang Geliang | Hu Yulan; Liu Xinyan | Li Zhenshi; Wu Shibao | Liaoning; First Team | Shanghai; First Team |
| 1974 | Wang Wenrong | Lin Meiqun | | | | Beijing; First Team | Heilongjiang |
| 1975* | Wang Wenrong | Yan Guili | Li Zhuomin; Liang Geliang | Li Ming; Liu Xinyan | Li Peng; Li Ming | Liaoning | Beijing |
| 1977 | Guo Yuehua | Huang Xiping | Li Yuxiang; Wang Jianqiang | Chou Chenyan; Huang Xiping | Guo Yuehua; Zhang Li | Beijing; First Team | Shanghai; First Team |
| 1978 | Shi Zhihao | Huang Xiping | Lu Yaohua; Teng Yi | Huang Xiping; Li Ming | Li Zhenshi; Zhang Deying | Bayi | Shanghai; First Team |
| 1979* | Wang Huiyuan | Qi Baoxiang | Liao Fumin; Huang Jianguo | Dai Lili; Shen Jianping | Wang Huiyuan; Liu Xinyan | PLA | Tianjin |
| 1980 | Teng Yi | Chen Lili | | | | Bayi | Zhejiang |
| 1981 | Chen Xinhua | Dai Lili | Chen Xinhua; Xu Zengcai | Dai Lili; Shen Jianping | Liang Meng; Shen Jianping | Beijing | Shanghai |
| 1982 | Guo Yuehua | Geng Lijuan | Chen Longcan; Cheng Yinghua | Dai Lili; Shen Jianping | Gu Wanyun; Geng Lijuan | Beijing | Shanghai |
| 1983* | Hui Jun | Jiao Zhimin | Huang Wenguan; Jiang Jialiang | Dai Lili; Shen Jianping | Teng Yi; Zhao Xiaoyun | PLA | Shanghai |
| 1984 | Wei Qingguang | Jiao Zhimin | Xie Saike; Zhou Hong | Dai Lili; Shen Jianping | Wei Qingguang; Li Chunli | Sichuan | Hebei |
| 1985 | Ma Wenge | Li Huifen | Wei Qingguang; Zhou Hong | Geng Lijuan; Li Huifen | Wei Qingguang; Li Chunli | Beijing | Hebei |
| 1986 | Zhou Hong | Liu Wei | Li Yong; Zhao Di | Xie Xiaoyan; Chen Hong | Tang Cheng; Liu Wei | Beijing | Henan |
| 1987* | Wang Tao | Jiao Zhimin | Chen Longcan; Cheng Yinghua | Geng Lijuan; Li Huifen | Wang Zhenyi; Liu Wei | PLA | Shandong |
| 1988 | Wang Tao | Yao Jiayin | Dong Jianli; Zhang Guanglong | Deng Yaping; Ying Ronghui | Zhao Weiguo; Li Jun | Beijing | Hubei |
| 1989 | Chen Zhibin | Deng Yaping | Chen Zhibin; Yu Shentong | Chen Jing; Hu Xiaoxin | Ma Wenge; Deng Yaping | Bayi | Hubei |
| 1990 | Zhang Lei | Ying Ronghui | Lü Lin; Wang Tao | Fan Jianxin; Qiao Yunping | Lin Zhigang; Liu Wei | Liaoning | Hebei |
| 1991 | Ma Wenge | Deng Yaping | Ma Wenge; Yu Shentong | Deng Yaping; Qiao Hong | Ma Wenge; Qiao Yunping | Heilongjiang | Shandong |
| 1992 | Ma Wenge | Qiao Yunping | Lü Lin; Wang Tao | Deng Yaping; Qiao Hong | Lin Zhigang; Deng Yaping | Tianjin | Henan |
| 1993* | Lü Lin | Deng Yaping | Liu Guoliang; Wang Tao | Li Ju; Wu Na | Wang Zhenyi; Qiao Yunping | Beijing | Hebei |
| 1994 | Wang Tao | Deng Yaping | Lin Zhigang; Liu Guoliang | Deng Yaping; Qiao Hong | Wang Tao; Liu Wei | Bayi; First Team | Shandong; First Team |
| 1995 | Ding Song | Deng Yaping | Wang Tao; Zhang Lei | Deng Yaping; Qiao Hong | Wang Tao; Liu Wei | Bayi | Jiangsu; First Team |
| 1996 | Zhang Yong | Wang Hui | Kong Linghui; Wang Fei | Cao Dongmei; Zhu Fang | Xiong Ke; Wang Chen | Guangdong | Jiangsu |
| 1997* | Wang Tao | Deng Yaping | Liu Guoliang; Wang Tao | Deng Yaping; Zhang Hui | Qin Zhijian; Yang Ying | Guangdong | Jiangsu |
| 1998 | Kong Linghui | Li Ju | Feng Zhe; Zhang Yong | Li Ju; Wang Nan | Ma Lin; Sun Jin | Shantou | Jiangsu |
| 1999 | Ma Lin | Wang Nan | Ma Lin; Qin Zhijian | Li Ju; Wang Nan | Liu Guozheng; Li Nan | Shanghai | Beijing |
| 2000 | Hou Yingchao | Bai Yang | Dan Mingjie; Tan Ruiwu | Jiang Huajun; Li Jia | | Liaoning | Hebei |
| 2001* | Ma Lin | Wang Nan | Liu Guozheng; Ma Lin | Wang Nan; Zhang Rui | Qin Zhijian; Yang Ying | PLA | Beijing |
| 2002 | Tang Peng | Li Xiaoxia | Qin Zhijian; Zhan Jian | Guo Yue; Li Xiaoxia | Zhan Jian; Bai yang | Jiangsu; First Team | Liaoning; First Team |
| 2003 | Wang Hao | Zhang Yining | Kong Linghui; Wang Hao | Wang Nan; Zhang Yining | Ma Lin; Wang Nan | Shantou | Beijing; First Team |
| 2004 | Wang Liqin | Guo Yan | Ceng Jia; Yu Shiqin | Chen Qing; Zhang Xiaowu | Xu Hui; Guo Yue | Jiangsu | Beijing |
| 2005* | Wang Liqin | Zhang Yining | Liu Shan; Wang Liqin | Li Xiaoxia; Peng Luyang | Xu Hui; Guo Yue | Jiangsu | Beijing |
| 2006 | Ma Lin | Peng Luyang | Chen Qi; Ma Lin | Ding Ning; Liu Shiwen | Ma Lin; Wang Nan | Bayi | Liaoning |
| 2007 | Wang Hao | Liu Shiwen | Ma Lin; Wang Liqin | Guo Yue; Li Xiaoxia | Hao Shuai; Liu Shiwen | Bayi | Liaoning |
| 2008 | Zhang Jike | Wen Jia | Wang Liqin; Xu Xin | Ding Ning; Guo Yan | Chen Qi; Chen Qing | Bayi | Beijing |
| 2009* | Wang Hao | Zhang Yining | Wang Liqin; Xu Xin | Guo Yue; Hou Xiaoxu | Wang Hao; Wen Jia | PLA | Beijing |
| 2010 | Zhang Jike | Ding Ning | Ma Long; Wang Hao | Guo Yue; Li Xiaoxia | Wu Hao; Mu Zi | Guangdong | Beijing |
| 2011 | Ma Long | Liu Shiwen | Ma Lin; Wang Hao | Guo Yan; Guo Yue | Zhang Chao; Cao Zhen | Beijing | Shandong |
| 2012 | Zhou Yu | Cao Zhen | Wang Liqin; Xu Xin | Cao Zhen; Mu Zi | Ma Long; Ding Ning | Beijing | Liaoning |
| 2013* | Ma Long | Li Xiaoxia | Fan Zhendong; Zhou Yu | Cao Zhen; Mu Zi | Ma Long; Ding Ning | PLA | Shandong |
| 2014 | Fan Zhendong | Zhu Yuling | Fan Zhendong; Xu Xin | Ding Ning; Liu Shiwen | Yan An; Sheng Dandan | Shanghai | Heilongjiang |
| 2015 | Xu Xin | Zhu Yuling | Ma Long; Xu Xin | Liu Shiwen; Zhu Yuling | Fan Zhendong; Mu Zi | Shanghai | Shanxi |
| 2016 | Fan Zhendong | Zhu Yuling | Fan Zhendong; Zhou Yu | Chen Xingtong; Wen Jia | Lin Gaoyuan; Liu Shiwen | Shanghai | Sichuan |
| 2017* | Ma Long | Ding Ning | Fan Zhendong; Zhou Yu | Gu Yuting; Mu Zi | Yu Ziyang; Wang Manyu | Shanghai | Sichuan |
| 2018 | Liang Jingkun | Wang Manyu | Shang Kun; Zhang Chao | Chen Meng; Zhu Yuling | Wang Chuqin; Sun Yingsha | Beijing | Liaoning |
| 2019 | Hou Yingchao | Sun Yingsha | | | Lin Gaoyuan; Wang Manyu | Bayi Nanchang | Shandong |
| 2020 | Fan Zhendong | Chen Meng | Ma Long; Xu Xin | Chen Meng; Wang Manyu | Wang Chuqin; Wang Manyu | Guangdong | Hebei |
| 2021* | Fan Zhendong | Wang Manyu | Ma Long; Wang Chuqin | Che Xiaoxi; Wang Manyu | Xu Xin; Liu Shiwen | Guangdong | Liaoning |
| 2022 | Fan Zhendong | Wang Yidi | Lin Gaoyuan; Zhou Qihao | Chen Xingtong; Qian Tianyi | Lin Gaoyuan; Wang Manyu | Shanghai | Liaoning |
| 2023 | Lin Shidong | Wang Yidi | | | Lin Shidong; Kuai Man | Shanghai | Jiangsu |
| 2024 | Huang Youzheng | Liu Weishan | | | Lin Gaoyuan; Liu Shiwen | Shanghai | Jiangsu |
| 2025* | Fan Zhendong | Wang Manyu | | | Lin Gaoyuan; Liu Shiwen | Beijing | Shandong |
| 2026 | | | Ma Long; Xu Xin | Kuai Man; Qin Yuxuan | Lin Shidong; Kuai Man | | |

* As table tennis at the National Games of China.
