= 1965 World Table Tennis Championships =

1965 edition of the World Table Tennis Championships

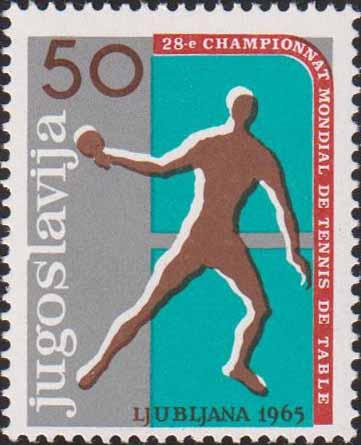
A stamp of Yugoslavia dedicated to the 1965 World Table Tennis Championships

The 1965 World Table Tennis Championships were held in Hala Tivoli, Ljubljana, SR Slovenia, SFR Yugoslavia from April 15 to April 25, 1965.

== Medalists ==
=== Team ===
Event	Gold	Silver	Bronze
Swaythling Cup; Men's team	China; Li Furong; Xu Yinsheng; Zhang Xielin; Zhou Lansun; Zhuang Zedong	Japan; Koji Kimura; Ken Konaka; Takao Nohira; Ichiro Ogimura; Hiroshi Takahashi	North Korea; Jung Kil-Hwa; Jung Ryang-Woong; Kim Chang-Ho; Kim Jung-Sam; Pak Sin Il
Corbillon Cup; Women's team	China; Li Henan; Liang Lizhen; Lin Huiqing; Zheng Minzhi	Japan; Naoko Fukatsu; Tsunao Isomura; Masako Seki; Noriko Yamanaka	England; Lesley Bell; Irene Ogus; Diane Rowe; Mary Shannon

=== Individual ===
Event	Gold	Silver	Bronze
Men's singles	(China) Zhuang Zedong	(China) Li Furong	(West Germany) Eberhard Schöler
Men's singles	(China) Zhuang Zedong	(China) Li Furong	(China) Zhou Lansun
Women's singles	(Japan) Naoko Fukatsu	(China) Lin Huiqing	(Japan) Noriko Yamanaka
Women's singles	(Japan) Naoko Fukatsu	(China) Lin Huiqing	(China) Li Li
Men's doubles	(China) Xu Yinsheng (China) Zhuang Zedong	(China) Wang Zhiliang (China) Zhang Xielin	(China) Li Furong (China) Wang Jiasheng
Men's doubles	(China) Xu Yinsheng (China) Zhuang Zedong	(China) Wang Zhiliang (China) Zhang Xielin	(China) Yu Changchun (China) Zhou Lansun
Women's doubles	(China) Lin Huiqing (China) Zheng Minzhi	(Japan) Masako Seki (Japan) Noriko Yamanaka	(China) Feng Mengya (China) Li Li
Women's doubles	(China) Lin Huiqing (China) Zheng Minzhi	(Japan) Masako Seki (Japan) Noriko Yamanaka	(China) Li Henan (China) Liang Lizhen
Mixed doubles	(Japan) Koji Kimura (Japan) Masako Seki	(China) Zhang Xielin (China) Lin Huiqing	(China) Zhuang Zedong (China) Liang Lizhen
Mixed doubles	(Japan) Koji Kimura (Japan) Masako Seki	(China) Zhang Xielin (China) Lin Huiqing	(Japan) Ken Konaka (Japan) Naoko Fukatsu
