= 1965 World Table Tennis Championships – Mixed doubles =

1965 Mixed doubles

The 1965 World Table Tennis Championships mixed doubles was the 28th edition of the mixed doubles championship.

Koji Kimura and Masako Seki defeated Chuang Shih-lin and Lin Hui-ching in the final by three sets to two.

== Results ==
Round of 16
(Japan) Koji Kimura (Japan) Masako Seki	21	21	21
(China) Li Fu-jung (China) Li Ho-nan	16	14	16
(Czechoslovakia) Vladimír Miko (Czechoslovakia) Marta Lužová	19	21	21	21
(West Germany) Eberhard Schöler (Hungary) Agnes Simon	21	10	17	13
(Japan) Ken Konaka (Japan) Naoko Fukazu	18	21	21	18	21
(Romania) Dorin Giurgiuca (Romania) Ella Constantinescu	21	17	9	21	19
(China) Wang Chia-sheng (China) Ti Chiang-hua	21	11	21	21
(Hungary) Péter Rózsás (Hungary) Sarolta Lukacs	7	21	16	14
(Japan) Hiroshi Takahashi (Japan) Noriko Yamanaka	18	21	21	21
(Socialist Federal Republic of Yugoslavia) Edvard Vecko (Socialist Federal Republic of Yugoslavia) Cirila Pirc	21	14	12	15
(China) Chuang Shih-lin (China) Lin Hui-ching	18	21	21	21	21
(Romania) Radu Negulescu (Romania) Maria Alexandru	21	6	23	16	16
(Sweden) Hans Alsér (Sweden) Eva Johansson	21	21	21	20	21
(West Germany) Ernst Gomolla (West Germany) Edit Buchholz	19	23	18	22	5
(China) Chuang Tse-tung (China) Liang Li-chen	21	21	21
(China) Su Kuo-hsi (China) Cheng Min-chin	13	9	10

Quarterfinals
(Japan) Kimura (Japan) Seki	17	21	21	21
(Czechoslovakia) Miko (Czechoslovakia) Lužová	21	19	14	16
(Japan) Konaka (Japan) Fukazu	21	21	17	21	21
(China) Wang Chia-sheng (China) Ti Chiang-hua	15	17	21	23	17
(Japan) Takahashi (Japan) Yamanaka	10	18	19
(China) Chuang Shih-lin (China) Lin Hui-ching	21	21	21
(Sweden) Alsér (Sweden) Johansson	16	16	19
(China) Chuang Tse-tung (China) Chiu Chung-hui	21	21	21

Semifinals
(Japan) Kimura (Japan) Seki	21	21	19	22
(Japan) Konaka (Japan) Fukazu	16	10	21	20
(China) Chuang Shih-lin (China) Lin Hui-ching	21	16	21	21
(China) Chuang Tse-tung (China) Liang Li-chen	8	21	14	11

Final
(Japan) Kimura (Japan) Seki	21	18	21	21	21
(China) Chuang Shih-lin (China) Lin Hui-ching	13	21	23	12	18

== See also ==
List of World Table Tennis Championships medalists
