= 1965 World Table Tennis Championships – Men's singles =

1965 Men's singles

The 1965 World Table Tennis Championships men's singles was the 28th edition of the men's singles championship.

Chuang Tse-Tung defeated Li Fu-Jung in the final, winning three sets to two to secure the title. It was the third consecutive win for Tse-Tung over Fu-Jung in World Championship finals.

== Seeds ==
1. (China) Chuang Tse-tung
2. (China) Li Fu-Jung
3. (China) Chang Shih-lin
4. (Japan) Koji Kimura
5. (China) Hsu Yin-Sheng
6. (China) Wang Chih-liang
7. (Japan) Ichiro Ogimura
8. (Sweden) Hans Alsér
9. (China) Wang Chia-Sheng
10. (North Korea) Jung Kil-Hwa
11. (Japan) Ken Konaka
12. (Sweden) Kjell Johansson
13. (Socialist Federal Republic of Yugoslavia) Vajislav Markovic
14. (China) Hu Tao-pen
15. (Romania) Dorin Giurgiuca
16. (China) Chou Lan-sun
17. (West Germany) Eberhard Schöler
18. (China) Yu Chang-chun
19. (Hungary) Zoltán Berczik

== Results ==
Round of 16
(China) Li Fu-Jung	15	21	21	21
(Japan) Takao Nohira	21	13	16	19
(China) Hu Tao-pen	31	21	21
(North Korea) Pak Sin Il	29	9	14
(China) Chou Lan-Sun	21	21	20	18	23
(Japan) Koji Kimura	15	9	22	21	21
(China) Hsu Ying-Sheng	21	21	21
(North Korea) Kim Jung Sam	15	13	12
(West Germany) Eberhard Schöler	10	21	18	21	21
(Socialist Federal Republic of Yugoslavia) Edvard Vecko	21	15	21	14	12
(China) Chang Shih-Lin	21	21	21
(China) Yu Chang-Chun	13	8	11
(Japan) Hiroshi Takahashi	19	21	18	21	21
(Socialist Federal Republic of Yugoslavia) Vajislav Markovic	21	19	21	18	15
(China) Chuang Tse-Tung	22	21	22
(China) Yu Yi-Tse	20	17	20

Quarterfinals
(China) Fu-Jung	21	19	21	21
(China) Tao-Pen	18	21	19	18
(China) Lan-Sun	21	21	21
(China) Ying-Sheng	10	13	18
(West Germany) Schöler	21	21	16	21	27
(China) Shih-Lin	15	14	21	23	25
(Japan) Takashashi	0
(China) Tse-Tung	3

Semifinals
(China) Fu-Jung	21	21	16	21
(China) Lan-Sun	11	16	21	19
(West Germany) Schöler	15	15	10
(China) Tse-Tung	21	21	21

Final
(China) Fu-Jung	18	21	21	21	15
(China) Tse-Tung	21	14	23	19	21

== See also ==
List of World Table Tennis Championships medalists
