= 1965 World Table Tennis Championships – Men's doubles =

1965 Men's doubles

The 1965 World Table Tennis Championships men's doubles was the 28th edition of the men's doubles championship. Chuang Tse-Tung and Hsu Yin-Sheng won the title after defeating Chang Shih-Lin and Wang Chih-Liang in the final by three sets to nil.

== Results ==
Round of 16
(China) Hsu Yin-Sheng (China) Chuang Tse-Tung	21	21	22
(North Korea) Duk Chi Jun (North Korea) Jung Ryang-Woong	14	19	17
(Japan) Ichiro Ogimura (Japan) Hiroshi Takahashi	17	21	18	22	21
(Hungary) László Pigniczki (Hungary) János Faházi	21	18	21	20	17
(Socialist Federal Republic of Yugoslavia) Dragutin Šurbek (Socialist Federal Republic of Yugoslavia) Zeljko Hrbud	21	21	21
(East Germany) Bernd Pornack (East Germany) Peter Fähnrich	9	15	19
(China) Wang Chia-Sheng (China) Li Fu-Jung	21	21	21
(Czechoslovakia) Vladimir Miko (Czechoslovakia) Jaroslav Staněk	16	14	9
(China) Chang Shih-Lin (China) Wang Chih-Liang	21	21	21
(Soviet Union) Anatoly Amelin (Soviet Union) Nikolai Novikov	10	13	9
(China) Yu Yi-Tse (China) Chen Sheng-Hing	21	21	17	21
(Socialist Federal Republic of Yugoslavia) Istvan Korpa (Socialist Federal Republic of Yugoslavia) Edvard Vecko	19	17	21	19
(Japan) Koji Kimura (Japan) Ken Konaka	21	24	21
(Sweden) Christer Johansson (Sweden) Carl-Johan Bernhardt	15	22	13
(Romania) Dorin Giurgiuca (Romania) Radu Negulescu	22	5	15	17
(China) Chou Len-Sun (China) Yu Chang-Chun	20	21	21	21

Quarterfinals
(China) Hsu Yin-Sheng (China) Chuang Tse-Tung	16	21	22	21
(Japan) Ogimura (Japan) Takahashi	21	16	20	10
(Socialist Federal Republic of Yugoslavia) Surbek (Socialist Federal Republic of Yugoslavia) Hrbud	4	14	16
(China) Wang Chia-Sheng (China) Li Fu-Jung	21	21	21
(China) Chang Shih-Lin (China) Wang Chih-Liang	21	22	21
(Socialist Federal Republic of Yugoslavia) Korpa (Socialist Federal Republic of Yugoslavia) Vecko	11	20	19
(Japan) Kimura (Japan) Konaka	21	15	21	19	14
(China) Chou Len-Sun (China) Yu Chang-Chun	16	21	19	21	21

Semifinals
(China) Hsu Yin-Sheng (China) Chuang Tse-Tung	21	21	14	21
(China) Li Fu-Jung (China) Wang Chia-Sheng	19	15	21	17
(China) Chang Shih-Lin (China) Wang Chih-Liang	21	21	21
(China) Chou Len-Sun (China) Yu Chang-Chun	15	19	17

Final
(China) Hsu Yin-Sheng (China) Chuang Tse-Tung	21	21	21
(China) Chang Shih-Lin (China) Wang Chih-Liang	15	13	13

== See also ==
List of World Table Tennis Championships medalists
