= 1965 World Table Tennis Championships – Women's team =

1965 Corbillon Cup (women's team)

The 1965 World Table Tennis Championships – Corbillon Cup (women's team) was the 21st edition of the women's team championship.

China won the gold medal defeating Japan in the final 3–0. England won the bronze medal after beating Romania in the third place play off.

== Medalists ==
=== Team ===
Event	Gold	Silver	Bronze
	China; Li Henan; Liang Lizhen; Lin Hui-ching; Cheng min-chih	Japan; Naoko Fukatsu; Tsunao Isomura; Masako Seki; Noriko Yamanaka	England; Lesley Bell; Irene Ogus; Diane Rowe; Mary Shannon

== Semifinal round ==
=== Group 1 ===
Team One	Team Two	Score
Japan	Czechoslovakia	3–0
England	Hungary	3–1
Japan	England	3–1
Hungary	Czechoslovakia	3–1
Japan	Hungary	3–1
England	Czechoslovakia	3–1

Pos	Team	P	W	L	Pts
1	Japan	3	3	0	6
2	England	3	2	1	4
3	Hungary	3	1	2	2
4	Czechoslovakia	3	0	3	0

=== Group 2 ===
Team One	Team Two	Score
Romania	Yugoslavia	3–0
China	West Germany	3–0
China	Yugoslavia	3–0
Romania	West Germany	3–0
West Germany	Yugoslavia	3–2
China	Romania	3–0

Pos	Team	P	W	L	Pts
1	China	3	3	0	6
2	Romania	3	2	1	4
3	West Germany	3	1	2	2
4	(Socialist Federal Republic of Yugoslavia) Yugoslavia	3	0	3	0

=== Third-place playoff ===
Team One	Team Two	Score
England	Romania	3–0

== Final ==
China 3		Japan 0	Score
Cheng Min-chih	bt	Seki	
Lin Hui-cheng	bt	Fukatsu	
Cheng Min-chih & Lin Hui-cheng	bt	?	

== See also ==
- List of World Table Tennis Championships medalists
