= 1965 World Table Tennis Championships – Women's doubles =

1965 Women's doubles

The 1965 World Table Tennis Championships women's doubles was the 27th edition of the women's doubles championship. Cheng Min-chih and Lin Hui-ching defeated Noriko Yamanaka and Masako Seki in the final by three sets to nil.

== Results ==
Round of 16
(Japan) Masako Seki (Japan) Noriko Yamanaka	22	21	21
(China) Ti Chiang-hua (China) Liu Mai-ying	20	19	12
(Hungary) Sarolta Lukács-Mathe (Hungary) Angela Papp	21	21	21
(Socialist Federal Republic of Yugoslavia) Cirila Piric (Socialist Federal Republic of Yugoslavia) Ruzica Anic	15	13	19
(Romania) Maria Alexandru (Romania) Ella Constantinescu	21	13	7	21	21
(East Germany) Doris Hovestädt (East Germany) Gabriele Geissler	18	21	21	18	9
(Socialist Federal Republic of Yugoslavia) Tatjana Zrimac (Socialist Federal Republic of Yugoslavia) Nina Lučić
(China) Li Ho-nan (China) Liang Li-chen	21	21	21
(Japan) Naoko Fukatsu (Japan) Tsunao Isomura	21	18	21	18	11
(China) L'i Li-fen (China) Feng Mengya	18	21	15	21	21
(China) Chou Il-ling (China) Chou Pao-chin	21	16	19	21	21
(East Germany) Elke Richter (East Germany) Carla Strauss	18	21	21	16	19
(Czechoslovakia) Marta Luzová (Czechoslovakia) Irena Bosa	21	13	18	21	16
(China) Lin Hui-ching (China) Cheng Min-chih	13	21	21	16	21
(England) Diane Rowe (England) Mary Shannon	17	21	21	18
(Poland) Dabuta Szmidt-Calinska (Poland) Czeslawa Nowaryla	21	9	23	21

Quarterfinals
(Japan) Seki (Japan) Yamanaka	21	21	21
(Hungary) Lukács-Mathe (Hungary) Papp	12	8	11
(Romania) Alexandru (Romania) Constantinescu	14	18	15
(China) Li Ho-nan (China) Liang Li-chen	21	21	21
(China) L'i Li-fen (China) Feng Mengya	21	21	21
(China) Chou I-ling (China) Chou Pao-chin	14	14	19
(China) Lin Hui-ching (China) Cheng Min-chih	19	21	19	22	21
(Poland) Szmidt-Calinska (Poland) Nowaryla	21	12	21	20	12

Semifinals
(Japan) Seki (Japan) Yamanaka	14	21	17	21	21
(China) Li Ho-nan (China) Liang Li-chen	21	16	21	11	11
(China) L'i Li-fen (China) Feng Mengya	16	16	18
(China) Lin Hui-ching (China) Cheng Min-chih	21	21	21

Final
(Japan) Seki (Japan) Yamanaka	19	17	20
(China) Lin Hui-ching (China) Cheng Min-chih	21	21	22

== See also ==
List of World Table Tennis Championships medalists
