= 1965 World Table Tennis Championships – Men's team =

1965 Swaythling Cup (men's team)

The 1965 World Table Tennis Championships – Swaythling Cup (men's team) was the 28th edition of the men's team championship.

China won the gold medal defeating Japan 5–2 in the final. North Korea won the bronze medal after defeating Yugoslavia in the third place play off.

== Medalists ==
=== Team ===
Event	Gold	Silver	Bronze
	China; Li Fu-jung; Chang Shih-Lin; Hsu Yin-Sheng; Chou Lan-sun; Chuang Tse-tung	Japan; Koji Kimura; Ken Konaka; Takao Nohira; Ichiro Ogimura; Hiroshi Takahashi	North Korea; Jung Kil-Hwa; Jung Ryang-Woong; Kim Chang-Ho; Kim Jung-Sam; Pak Sin Il

== Semifinal round ==
=== Group 1 ===
Team One	Team Two	Score
China	Soviet Union	5–0
West Germany	Romania	5–4
Yugoslavia	Czechoslovakia	5–2
China	West Germany	5–1
Czechoslovakia	Soviet Union	5–3
Yugoslavia	Romania	5-1
China	Yugoslavia	5–0
Soviet Union	West Germany	5–4
Romania	Czechoslovakia	5–3
Yugoslavia	West Germany	5–3
China	Czechoslovakia	5–0
Soviet Union	Romania	5–3
Czechoslovakia	West Germany	5–1
Yugoslavia	Soviet Union	5-3
China	Romania	5–0

Pos	Team	P	W	L	Pts
1	China	5	5	0	10
2	(Socialist Federal Republic of Yugoslavia) Yugoslavia	5	4	1	8
3	Czechoslovakia	5	2	3	4
4	Soviet Union	5	2	3	4
5	West Germany	5	1	4	2
6	Romania	5	1	4	2

=== Group 2 ===
Team One	Team Two	Score
Japan	England	5–0
Sweden	Iran	5–1
North Korea	Hungary	5–1
England	Hungary	5–4
North Korea	Iran	5–3
Japan	Sweden	5-0
Sweden	England	5–2
Hungary	Iran	5–1
Japan	North Korea	5–2
England	Iran	5–1
Japan	Hungary	5–1
North Korea	Sweden	5–1
Sweden	Hungary	5-1
North Korea	England	5–1
Japan	Iran	5–0

Pos	Team	P	W	L	Pts
1	Japan	5	5	0	10
2	North Korea	5	4	1	8
3	Sweden	5	3	2	6
4	England	5	2	3	4
5	Hungary	5	1	4	2
6	Iran	5	0	5	0

== Third-place playoff ==
Team One	Team Two	Score
North Korea	Yugoslavia	5–2

== Final ==
China 5		Japan 2	Score
?	bt	?	
Li Fu-jung	bt	Kimura	
Chuang Tse-tung	bt	Kimura	
Chang Shih-lin	lost to	Takahashi	
Chuang Tse-tung	lost to	Takahashi	18–21 20–22
?	bt	?	
Chuang Tse-tung	bt	Konaka	19–21 21–12 21–16

== See also ==
List of World Table Tennis Championships medalists
