= 1963 World Table Tennis Championships – Men's doubles =

1963 Men's doubles

The 1963 World Table Tennis Championships men's doubles was the 27th edition of the men's doubles championship. Chang Shih-Lin and Wang Chih-Liang won the title after defeating Hsu Yin-Sheng and Chuang Tse-Tung in the final by three sets to nil.

== Results ==
Round of 16
(China) Hsu Yin-Sheng (China) Chuang Tse-Tung | 21 | 21 | 22
(England) Johnny Leach (Czechoslovakia) Ladislav Štípek | 19 | 17 | 20
(China) Ma Chin-Pao (China) Liao Wen-Ting | 21 | 21 | 21
(Czechoslovakia) Jaroslav Staněk (Czechoslovakia) Vilim Polakovic | 18 | 12 | 19
(China) Yang Jai-Hua (China) Chou Lan-Sun | 21 | 21 | 19 | 21
(Socialist Federal Republic of Yugoslavia) Vojislav Markovic (Socialist Federal Republic of Yugoslavia) Janez Teran | 13 | 8 | 21 | 9
(Japan) Keiichi Miki (Japan) Ken Konaka | 21 | 21 | 8 | 21
(China) Kuo Chung-Kung (China) Chen Hsieh-Chung | 15 | 16 | 21 | 18
(China) Wang Chia-Sheng (China) Li Fu-Jung | 21 | 21 | 21
(China) Jung Kuo-Tuan (China) Yu Chang-Chun | 13 | 14 | 15
(Czechoslovakia) Ivan Andreadis (Czechoslovakia) Vladimir Miko | 21 | 21 | 18 | 21
(North Korea) Kim Jung-Sam (North Korea) Pak Sin Il | 18 | 13 | 21 | 19
(China) Hu Tao-pen (China) Su Kuo-Hsi | 14 | 17 | 21 | 21 | 21
(Romania) Gheorge Cobirzan (Romania) Dorin Giurgiuca | 21 | 21 | 10 | 18 | 11
(United States) Dick Miles (United States) Erwin Klein | 18 | 21 | 12
(China) Chang Shih-Lin (China) Wang Chih-Liang | 21 | 23 | 21

Quarterfinals
(China) Hsu Yin-Sheng (China) Chuang Tse-Tung | 21 | 19 | 21 | 21
(Czechoslovakia) Stanek (Czechoslovakia) Polakovic | 18 | 21 | 14 | 14
(China) Yang Jui-Hua (China) Chou Lan-Sun | 17 | 16 | 21 | 10
(Japan) Miki (Japan) Konaka | 21 | 21 | 16 | 21
(China) Wang Chia-Sheng (China) Li Fu-Jung | 16 | 17 | 21 | 22 | 21
(Czechoslovakia) Andreadis (Czechoslovakia) Miko | 21 | 21 | 17 | 20 | 18
(China) Hu Tao-Pen (China) Su Kuo-Hsi | 8 | 15 | 16
(China) Chang Shih-Lin (China) Wang Chih-Liang | 21 | 21 | 21

Semifinals
(China) Hsu Yin-Sheng (China) Chuang Tse-Tung | 21 | 21 | 21
(Japan) Miki (Japan) Konaka | 13 | 19 | 15
(China) Wang Chia-Sheng (China) Li Fu-Jung | 20 | 18 | 12
(China) Chang Shih-Lin (China) Wang Chih-Liang | 22 | 21 | 21

Final
(China) Hsu Yin-Sheng (China) Chuang Tse-Tung | 18 | 15 | 17
(China) Chang Shih-Lin (China) Wang Chih-Liang | 21 | 21 | 21

== See also ==
List of World Table Tennis Championships medalists
