= 1963 World Table Tennis Championships =

1963 edition of the World Table Tennis Championships

The 1963 World Table Tennis Championships were held in Prague from April 5 to April 14, 1963.

== Medalists ==
=== Team ===
Event	Gold	Silver	Bronze
Swaythling Cup; Men's Team	China; Li Furong; Wang Jiasheng; Xu Yinsheng; Zhang Xielin; Zhuang Zedong	Japan; Koji Kimura; Ken Konaka; Keiichi Miki; Ichiro Ogimura	West Germany; Erich Arndt; Ernst Gomolla; Dieter Michalek; Eberhard Schöler; Elmar Stegmann
Swaythling Cup; Men's Team	China; Li Furong; Wang Jiasheng; Xu Yinsheng; Zhang Xielin; Zhuang Zedong	Japan; Koji Kimura; Ken Konaka; Keiichi Miki; Ichiro Ogimura	Sweden; Hans Alsér; Stellan Bengtsson; Carl-Johan Bernhardt; Kjell Johansson
Corbillon Cup; Women's Team	Japan; Kazuko Ito; Kimiyo Matsuzaki; Masako Seki; Noriko Yamanaka	Romania; Maria Alexandru; Ella Constantinescu; Maria Catrinel Folea; Georgita Pitica	China; Liang Lizhen; Qiu Zhonghui; Sun Meiying; Wang Jian
Corbillon Cup; Women's Team	Japan; Kazuko Ito; Kimiyo Matsuzaki; Masako Seki; Noriko Yamanaka	Romania; Maria Alexandru; Ella Constantinescu; Maria Catrinel Folea; Georgita Pitica	Hungary; Éva Kóczián-Foldi; Erzsebet Heirits; Sarolta Lukacs; Eva Poor

=== Individual ===
Event	Gold	Silver	Bronze
Men's singles	(China) Zhuang Zedong	(China) Li Furong	(China) Zhang Xielin
Men's singles	(China) Zhuang Zedong	(China) Li Furong	(China) Wang Zhiliang
Women's singles	(Japan) Kimiyo Matsuzaki	(Romania) Maria Alexandru	(Romania) Ella Constantinescu
Women's singles	(Japan) Kimiyo Matsuzaki	(Romania) Maria Alexandru	(China) Sun Meiying
Men's doubles	(China) Wang Zhiliang (China) Zhang Xielin	(China) Xu Yinsheng (China) Zhuang Zedong	(China) Li Furong (China) Wang Jiasheng
Men's doubles	(China) Wang Zhiliang (China) Zhang Xielin	(China) Xu Yinsheng (China) Zhuang Zedong	(Japan) Ken Konaka (Japan) Keiichi Miki
Women's doubles	(Japan) Kimiyo Matsuzaki (Japan) Masako Seki	(England) Diane Rowe (England) Mary Shannon	(China) Qiu Zhonghui (China) Wang Jian
Women's doubles	(Japan) Kimiyo Matsuzaki (Japan) Masako Seki	(England) Diane Rowe (England) Mary Shannon	(Japan) Kazuko Ito (Japan) Noriko Yamanaka
Mixed doubles	(Japan) Koji Kimura (Japan) Kazuko Ito	(Japan) Keiichi Miki (Japan) Masako Seki	(China) Zhuang Zedong (China) Qiu Zhonghui
Mixed doubles	(Japan) Koji Kimura (Japan) Kazuko Ito	(Japan) Keiichi Miki (Japan) Masako Seki	(Hungary) János Faházi (Hungary) Éva Kóczián-Foldi
