= 1963 World Table Tennis Championships – Men's singles =

1963 Men's singles

The 1963 World Table Tennis Championships men's singles was the 27th edition of the men's singles championship.

Chuang Tse-Tung defeated Li Fu-Jung in the final, winning three sets to one to secure the title.

== Results ==
Round of 16
(North Korea) Jung Kil-Hwa	17	21	18	21	19
(China) Yu Chang-Chun	21	15	21	8	21
(China) Wang Chi-Liang	21	19	21	9	21
(Japan) Koji Kimura	19	21	12	21	19
(China) Hu Tao-Pen	21	21	21
(China) Yang Jai-Hua	15	18	13
(China) Li Fu-Jung	21	21	21
(China) Chou Lan-Sun	11	16	11
(Japan) Ichiro Ogimura	12	15	21	21	12
(Hungary) Zoltán Berczik	21	21	17	17	16
(China) Chang Shih-Lin	21	21	21	20	21
(Socialist Federal Republic of Yugoslavia) Sojislav Markovic	19	13	12	22	15
(Sweden) Hans Alsér	21	21	21
(Czech Republic) Zdenek Svab	16	2	5
(China) Chuang Tse-Tung	21	21	15	21
(Japan) Ken Konaka	13	16	21	16

Quarterfinals
(China) Chang-Chun	13	12	19
(China) Chi-Liang	21	21	21
(China) Tao-Pen	16	12	17
(China) Fu-Jung	21	21	21
(Japan) Ogimura	18	22	16	21	14
(China) Shih-Lin	21	20	21	18	21
(Sweden) Alser	18	18	21	18
(China) Tse-Tung	21	21	19	21

Semifinals
(China) Chi-Liang	18	10	15
(China) Fu-Jung	21	21	21
(China) Shih-Lin	18	13	22
(China) Tse-Tung	21	21	24

Final
(China) Fu-Jung	16	15	21	18
(China) Tse-Tung	21	21	10	21

== See also ==
List of World Table Tennis Championships medalists
