= 1965 World Table Tennis Championships – Women's singles =

1965 Women's singles

The 1965 World Table Tennis Championships women's singles was the 28th edition of the women's singles championship. Naoko Fukatsu defeated Lin Hui-ching in the final by three sets to two, to win the title.

== Seeds ==
1. (Romania) Maria Alexandru
2. (Romania) Ella Constantinescu
3. (Japan) Masako Seki
4. (Japan) Noriko Yamanaka
5. (China) Han Ju-chen
6. (Japan) Naoko Fukatsu
7. (China) Lin Hui-ching
8. (Hungary) Éva Kóczián-Földy
9. (China) Liang Li-chen
10. (England) Mary Shannon
11. (China) Li Ho-nan
12. (China) Ti Chiang-hua
13. (Hungary) Erzsebet Jurik
14. (England) Diane Rowe
15. (China) L'i Li-fen
16. (China) Cheng Min-chih
17. (Soviet Union) Zoja Rudnova
18. (West Germany) Edit Buchholz
19. (Soviet Union) Svetlana Grinberg

== Results ==
Round of 16
(Japan) Naoko Fukatsu	21	21	21
(West Germany) Edit Buchholz	8	7	6
(China) Cheng Min-chih	21	21	21
(Czechoslovakia) Marta Luzova	16	14	8
(China) Liang Li-chen	21	21	21
(Poland) Danuta Calinska-Szmidt	11	13	12
(Japan) Noriko Yamanaka	15	21	9	21	21
(Soviet Union) Svetlana Grinberg	21	18	21	19	15
(China) Lin Hui-ching	21	21	21
(England) Diane Rowe	16	14	18
(Romania) Maria Alexandru	13	21	21	21
(China) Chou Il-ling	21	17	7	11
(Japan) Masako Seki	21	21	22
(Hungary) Agnes Simon-Almási	12	15	20
(China) L'i Li-fen	21	21	21
(Socialist Federal Republic of Yugoslavia) Cirila Pirc	14	9	18

Quarterfinals
(Japan) Fukatsu	11	14	21	21	21
(China) Cheng Min-Chih	21	21	19	16	11
(China) Liang Li-Chen	21	14	15	16
(Japan) Yamanaka	16	21	21	21
(China) Lin Hui-ching	21	14	21	21
(Romania) Alexandru	12	21	17	17
(Japan) Seki	16	17	15
(China) L'i Li-fen	21	21	21

Semifinals
(Japan) Fukatsu	14	13	21	21	22
(Japan) Yamanaka	21	21	13	17	20
(China) Lin Hui-ching	21	21	19	21
(China) L'i Li-fen	7	10	21	15

Final
(Japan) Fukatsu	21	21	15	13	21
(China) Lin Hui-ching	12	17	21	21	16

== See also ==
List of World Table Tennis Championships medalists
