= 1963 World Table Tennis Championships – Men's team =

1963 Swaythling Cup (men's team)

The 1963 World Table Tennis Championships – Swaythling Cup (men's team) was the 27th edition of the men's team championship.

China won the gold medal defeating Japan 5–1 in the final. West Germany and Sweden both won a bronze medal after being eliminated at the semi-final stage.

== Medalists ==
=== Team ===
Event	Gold	Silver	Bronze
	China; Li Furong; Wang Jiasheng; Xu Yinsheng; Zhang Xielin; Zhuang Zedong	Japan; Koji Kimura; Ken Konaka; Keiichi Miki; Ichiro Ogimura	West Germany; Erich Arndt; Ernst Gomolla; Dieter Michalek; Eberhard Schöler; Elmar Stegmann
	China; Li Furong; Wang Jiasheng; Xu Yinsheng; Zhang Xielin; Zhuang Zedong	Japan; Koji Kimura; Ken Konaka; Keiichi Miki; Ichiro Ogimura	Sweden; Hans Alsér; Stellan Bengtsson; Carl-Johan Bernhardt; Kjell Johansson

== Swaythling Cup tables ==
=== Group A ===
Pos	Team	P	W	L	Pts
1	China	6	6	0	12
2	(Socialist Federal Republic of Yugoslavia) Yugoslavia	6	5	1	10
3	Iran	6	4	2	8
4	Soviet Union	6	3	3	6
5	Denmark	6	2	4	4
6	Israel	6	1	5	2
7	Greece	6	0	6	0

=== Group B ===
Pos	Team	P	W	L	Pts
1	West Germany	7	7	0	14
2	(South Korea) Korea	7	6	1	12
3	Hungary	7	5	2	10
4	Romania	7	4	3	8
5	France	7	2	5	4
5	Brazil	7	2	5	4
5	Australia	7	2	5	4
8	Indonesia	7	0	7	0

=== Group C ===
Pos	Team	P	W	L	Pts
1	Sweden	7	7	0	14
2	Soviet Union	7	6	1	12
3	East Germany	7	5	2	10
4	Portugal	7	4	3	8
5	Austria	7	3	4	6
6	(Egypt) UAR	7	2	5	4
7	Switzerland	7	1	6	2
8	Wales	7	0	7	0

=== Group D ===
Pos	Team	P	W	L	Pts
1	Japan	6	6	0	12
2	United States	6	5	1	10
3	England	6	4	2	8
4	India	6	3	3	6
5	Poland	6	2	4	4
6	Netherlands	6	1	5	2
7	North Vietnam	6	0	6	0

== Semifinals ==
Team One	Team Two	Score
China	West Germany	5–1
Japan	Sweden	5–0

== Final ==
China 5		Japan 1	Score
Chuang Tse-tung	lost to	Kimura	20–22 21–13 13–21
Chuang Tse-tung	bt	Ogimura	21–19 21–19
Chang Shih-lin	bt	Kimura	21–5 21–11
Chang Shih-lin	bt	Miki	21–9 21–8
Hsu Yin-sheng	bt	Ogiumra	21–11 21–17
Hsu Yin-sheng	bt	Miki	21–12 23–21

== See also ==
List of World Table Tennis Championships medalists
