= 1961 World Table Tennis Championships – Men's singles =

1961 Men's singles

The 1961 World Table Tennis Championships men's singles was the 26th edition of the men's singles championship.

Chuang Tse-Tung defeated Li Fu-Jung in the final, winning three sets to one to secure the title.

== Results ==
Round of 16
(China) Li Fu-Jung	21	21	21
(China) Hsueh Wei-chu	14	10	11
(China) Hu Tao-Pen	21	21	21
(Brazil) Biriba da Costa	18	14	16
(China) Chang Shih-Lin	w/o
(China) Yang Jai-Hua	scr
(Japan) Keiichi Miki	19	13	16	21	21
(Hungary) Ferenc Sidó	21	21	21	16	8
(China) Chuang Tse-Tung	21	21	21
(West Germany) Conny Freundorfer	15	14	15
(Japan) Ichiro Ogimura	22	21	21
(Soviet Union) Gennadi Averin	20	15	10
(China) Hsu Yin-Sheng	21	21	21
(Japan) Teruo Murakami	16	11	16
(China) Tan Cho-Lin	21	21	21
(China) Wang Chia-Sheng	8	18	17

Quarterfinals
(China) Fu-Jung	21	21	21
(China) Tao-Pen	11	14	12
(China) Shih-Lin	21	21	21
(Japan) Miki	9	5	11
(China) Tse-Tung	21	23	21
(Japan) Ogimura	9	21	10
(China) Yin-Sheng	21	21	21
(China) Cho-Lin	8	14	11

Semifinals
(China) Fu-Jung	21	21	21
(China) Shih-Lin	15	11	10
(China) Tse-Tung	21	21	21
(China) Yin-Sheng	8	14	11

Final
(China) Tse-Tung	21	21	19	21
(China) Fu-Jung	15	15	21	17

== See also ==
- List of World Table Tennis Championships medalists
