= China national table tennis team =

- Abbreviation: CTTT
- Formation: 1952; 74 years ago
- Type: National team
- Headquarters: Beijing, China
- Head coach: Li Sun
- Website: www.ctta.cn

The China national table tennis team is the national representative team of the People's Republic of China, and was founded in 1952.

== Players ==
=== Men's team ===
WR	Name	Official birthdate	Provincial team	Hand	Grip
1	Wang Chuqin	11 May 2000 (age 26)	Beijing	Left	Shakehand
3	Lin Shidong	18 April 2005 (age 21)	Hainan	Right	Shakehand
5	Liang Jingkun	20 October 1996 (age 30)	Hebei	Right	Shakehand
22	Zhou Qihao	12 January 1997 (age 29)	Guangdong	Right	Shakehand
29	Lin Gaoyuan	19 March 1995 (age 31)	Guangdong	Left	Shakehand
40	Xiang Peng	7 March 2003 (age 23)	Zhejiang	Right	Shakehand
71	Yuan Licen	28 May 2000 (age 26)	Liaoning	Left	Shakehand
82	Liang Yanning	2 March 2001 (age 25)		Right	Shakehand
83	Sun Wen	1997		Right	Shakehand
95	Wen Ruibo				
99	Huang Youzheng				
110	Liu Dingshuo	13 January 1998 (age 28)	Shandong	Right	Shakehand
128	Chen Yuanyu				
129	Xu Yingbin	12 March 2001 (age 25)	Heilongjiang	Right	Shakehand
132	Xue Fei	10 February 1999 (age 27)	Hubei	Right	Penhold
136	Sun Yang				
143	Zhou Kai	1 March 1996 (age 30)	PLA	Right	Shakehand
148	Zeng Beixun				
196	Cao Wei	8 September 1999 (age 27)	Beijing	Left	Shakehand
212	Zhao Zihao	6 January 1997 (age 29)	Shanghai	Right	Penhold
236	Niu Guankai	2002			
263	Zhai Jiale				
275	Chen Hengda				

=== Women's team ===
WR	Name	Official birthdate	Pr	Hand	Grip
1	Sun Yingsha	4 November 2000 (age 25)	Hebei	Right	Shakehand
2	Wang Manyu	9 February 1999 (age 27)	Heilongjiang	Right	Shakehand
3	Wang Yidi	14 February 1997 (age 29)	Yunnan	Right	Shakehand
5	Chen Xingtong	27 May 1997 (age 29)	Liaoning	Right	Shakehand
22	Kuai Man	7 February 2004 (age 22)	Jiangsu	Left	Shakehand
25	Qian Tianyi	23 January 2000 (age 26)	Jiangsu	Left	Shakehand
44	He Zhuojia	25 October 1998 (age 28)	Hebei	Right	Shakehand
46	Li Yake	2002		Right	Shakehand
47	Shi Xunyao	16 July 2001 (age 25)	Jiangsu	Left	Shakehand
57	Chen Yi	2004		Right	Shakehand
59	Zhang Rui	23 January 1997 (age 29)	Hubei	Right	Shakehand
73	Fan Siqi	28 February 1998 (age 28)	Shandong	Right	Shakehand
77	Liu Weishan	4 October 1999 (age 27)	Tianjin	Right	Shakehand
81	Wang Xiaoting	2000		Right	Shakehand
93	Wu Yangchen	2002		Right	Penhold
96	Yang Yiyun	2003		Right	Shakehand
128	Han Feier	2003		Left	Shakehand
140	Zhu Sibing			Right	Shakehand
141	Guo Yuhan	18 February 2000 (age 26)	Beijing	Right	Shakehand
143	Qin Yuxuan	2006		Right	Shakehand
154	Xu Yi	2005		Right	Shakehand
160	Qi Fei	2000		Right	Penhold
212	Fan Shuhan	2004		Right	Shakehand
239	Zhang Xiangyu	2005		Left	Shakehand
260	Yang Huize	2010		Right	Shakehand
268	Jin Mengyan	2004		Right	Shakehand
280	Wang Tianyi	2 March 2002 (age 24)	Shandong	Right	Shakehand

== Staffs ==
=== Team manager and Head coaches ===
Position	Name	Birthdate
Team manager	(China) Huang Biao	24 April 1965 (age 61)
Head coach	(China) Li Sun	12 July 1963 (age 63)
Men's team head coach	(China) Wang Hao	15 December 1983 (age 42)
Women's team head coach	(China) Ma Lin	19 February 1980 (age 46)
Men's second team coach	(China) Liu Zhiqiang	15 June 1981 (age 45)
Women's second team coach	(China) Yan Sen	16 August 1975 (age 51)

=== Men's first team ===
Name	Birthdate
(China) Wang Hao	15 December 1983 (age 42)
(China) Liu Heng	
(China) Ma Junfeng	

=== Women's first team ===
Name	Birthdate
(China) Ma Lin	19 February 1980 (age 46)
(China) Xiao Zhan	22 May 1968 (age 58)
(China) Chen Bin	19 February 1966 (age 60)
(China) Zhang Qin	1971 (age 54–55)
(China) Huang Haicheng	1973 (age 52–53)

=== Men's second team ===
Name	Birthdate
(China) Liu Bin	
(China) Yu Yang	
(China) Chen Zhenjiang	

=== Women's second team ===
Name	Birthdate
(China) Li Dacheng	
(China) Zhu Wentao	
(China) Wang Xiang	

=== Fitness coaches ===
Name	Birthdate
(China) Wang Qiaozhi	1992 (age 33–34)
(China) Lu Aifa	1958 (age 67–68)
(China) Ji Chabin	
(China) Zhou Kangkang	

== Historical staffs ==
=== Team Managers ===
	Term	Name	Lifespan
1	1958-1974	(China) Zhang Junhan	1927-2008
2	1974-1985	(China) Shen Jichang	
3	1985-1994	(China) Yao Zhenxu	1947-
4	1994-present	(China) Huang Biao	1965-

=== Head coaches ===
	Term	Name	Lifespan
1	1970-1976	(China) Xu Yinsheng	1938-
2	1976-1983	(China) Li Furong	1942-
3	1983-1989	(China) Xu Shaofa	1945-
4	1997-2005	(China) Cai Zhenhua	1961-
5	2013-2017	(China) Liu Guoliang	1976-

=== Men's team head coaches ===
	Term	Name	Lifespan
1	1952-1958	(China) Liang Zhaohui	1921-
2	1958-1968	(China) Fu Qifang	1923-1968
3	1970-1976	(China) Xu Yinsheng	1938-
4	1976-1983	(China) Li Furong	1942-
5	1983-1989	(China) Xu Shaofa	1945-
6	1989-1991	(China) Xi Enting	1946-
7	1991-2000	(China) Cai Zhenhua	1961-
8	2000-2003	(China) Yin Xiao	1953-
9	2003-2017	(China) Liu Guoliang	1976-
10	2017-2018; 2019-2022	(China) Qin Zhijian	1976-
11	2018-2019	(China) Liu Guozheng	1980-

=== Women's team head coaches ===
	Term	Name	Lifespan
1	1961-1965	(China) Zhuang Jiafu	1934-
2	1965-1968	(China) Rong Guotuan	1938-1968
3	1969-1971	(China) Wang Zhiliang	1941-
4	1971-1975	(China) Lin Huiqing	1941-
5	1975-1995	(China) Zhang Xielin	1940-
6	1995-2005	(China) Lu Yuansheng	1954-
7	2005-2012	(China) Shi Zhihao	1959-
8	2012-2017	(China) Kong Linghui	1975-
9	2017-2022	(China) Li Sun	1963-

== Qualifying competitions ==
- Road to Düsseldorf 2017

== Records of the youngest ==
=== Men's in Major Three ===
Events	Name	Birthdate	Debut competition	Debut date	Debut Age
Singles	Fan Zhendong	22 January 1997	2013 World Table Tennis Championships	15 May 2013	16 years, 113 days
Doubles	Liu Guoliang	10 January 1976	1993 World Table Tennis Championships	May 1993	17 years, 4 months
Team	Fan Zhendong	22 January 1997	2014 World Table Tennis Championships	29 April 2014	17 years, 97 days

=== Women's in Major Three ===
Events	Name	Birthdate	Debut competition	Debut date	Debut Age
Singles	Guo Yue	17 July 1988	2003 World Table Tennis Championships	21 May 2003	14 years, 308 days
Doubles	Guo Yue	17 July 1988	2003 World Table Tennis Championships	21 May 2003	14 years, 308 days
Team	Guo Yue	17 July 1988	2004 World Table Tennis Championships	2 March 2004	15 years, 229 days

Notes: Major Three (三大赛) is the abbreviation of the most important three table tennis competitions including World Championships, Olympics and World Cups.

=== Singles champions in World Tours ===
Gender	Name	Birthdate	Competitions	Date	Age
Male	Yu Ziyang	23 May 1998	2014 Japan Open	22 June 2014	16 years, 30 days
Female	Guo Yue	17 July 1988	2002 Austria Open	21 September 2003	15 years, 66 days

== Notable players ==
=== Grand Slams ===
A Grand Slam is earned by a player who wins singles crowns at Olympic Games, World Championships, and World Cup.

Name	Gender	Time won firstly			Age of Grand Slam
Name	Gender	Olympics	World Championships	World Cup	Age of Grand Slam
Deng Yaping	Female	1992	1991	1996	23 years, 237 days
Liu Guoliang	Male	1996	1999	1996	23 years, 210 days
Kong Linghui	Male	2000	1995	1995	24 years, 343 days
Wang Nan	Female	2000	1999	1997	21 years, 337 days
Zhang Yining	Female	2004	2005	2001	23 years, 212 days
Zhang Jike	Male	2012	2011	2011	24 years, 168 days
Li Xiaoxia	Female	2012	2013	2008	24 years, 41 days
Ding Ning	Female	2016	2011	2011	26 years, 52 days
Ma Long	Male	2016	2015	2012	27 years, 297 days
Fan Zhendong	Male	2024	2021	2016	27 years, 195 days

=== Junior Grand Slams ===
A Junior Grand Slam is earned by a player who wins singles crowns at Summer Youth Olympics and World Youth Championships.

Name	Gender	Time won firstly		Age of Junior Grand Slam
Name	Gender	Summer Youth Olympics	World Youth Championships	Age of Junior Grand Slam
Gu Yuting	Female	2010	2013	18 years, 328 days
Fan Zhendong	Male	2014	2012	17 years, 210 days
Sun Yingsha	Female	2018	2017	17 years, 29 days

=== Hall of Fame ===
This page lists the players of China table tennis team inducted in the ITTF Hall of Fame – founded in 1993 – in the order as they appear in the official hall of fame maintained by the International Table Tennis Federation. The ITTF Hall of Fame includes both table tennis players and officers.

Name	Gender	Lifespan	Enshrined
Zhuang Zedong	Male	25 August 1940 - 10 February 2013 (aged 72)	1999
Lin Huiqing	Female	1941 (age 84–85)	1999
Li Furong	Male	1942 (age 83–84)	1999
Guo Yuehua	Male	1956 (age 69–70)	2001
Jiang Jialiang	Male	3 March 1964 (age 62)	2001
Zhang Xielin	Male	1940 (age 85–86)	2001
Liang Geliang	Male	1950 (age 75–76)	2001
Cao Yanhua	Female	1962 (age 63–64)	2001
Wang Tao	Male	13 December 1967 (age 58)	2003
Deng Yaping	Female	6 February 1973 (age 53)	2003
Wang Nan	Female	23 October 1978 (age 48)	2003
Ge Xin'ai	Female	1953 (age 72–73)	2003
Liu Wei	Female	27 November 1969 (age 56)	2003
Liu Guoliang	Male	10 January 1976 (age 50)	2005
Wang Liqin	Male	18 June 1978 (age 48)	2005
Li Ju	Female	22 January 1976 (age 50)	2005
Qiao Hong	Female	21 November 1968 (age 57)	2005
Zhang Yining	Female	5 October 1981 (age 45)	2005
Xu Yinsheng	Male	12 May 1938 (age 88)	2010
Cai Zhenhua	Male	3 September 1961 (age 65)	2010
Zhang Deying	Female	1 July 1953 (age 73)	2010
Kong Linghui	Male	18 October 1975 (age 51)	2010
Ma Lin	Male	19 February 1980 (age 46)	2010
Chen Qi	Male	15 April 1983 (age 43)	2010
Wang Hao	Male	1 December 1983 (age 42)	2010
Guo Yue	Female	17 July 1988 (age 38)	2010
Li Xiaoxia	Female	21 June 1988 (age 38)	2013
Ma Long	Male	20 October 1988 (age 38)	2013
Zhang Jike	Male	16 February 1988 (age 38)	2013
Ding Ning	Female	20 June 1990 (age 36)	2016
Xu Xin	Male	8 January 1990 (age 36)	2016
Liu Shiwen	Female	12 April 1991 (age 35)	2016

== Record of world champions ==
Active player

	Name	Sex	World Championships				Olympics				World Cup			Total
	Name	Sex	Singles	Doubles	Mixed Doubles	Teams	Singles	Doubles	Mixed Doubles	Teams	Singles	Doubles	Teams	Total
1	Ma Long (born 1988)	Men	2015, 2017, 2019	2011, 2019		2006, 2008, 2010, 2012, 2014, 2016, 2018, 2022, 2024	2016, 2020			2012, 2016, 2020, 2024	2012, 2015, 2024		2009, 2010, 2011, 2013, 2015, 2018, 2019, 2023	31
2	Wang Nan (born 1978)	Women	1999, 2001, 2003	1999, 2001, 2003, 2005, 2007	2003	1997, 2000, 2001, 2004, 2006, 2008	2000	2000, 2004		2008	1997, 1998, 2003, 2007		2007	24
3	Liu Shiwen (born 1991)	Women	2019	2015, 2017	2019	2012, 2014, 2016, 2018				2016	2009, 2012, 2013, 2015, 2019		2009, 2010, 2013, 2015, 2018, 2019	20
3	Ding Ning (born 1990)	Women	2011, 2015, 2017	2017		2012, 2014, 2016, 2018	2016			2012, 2016	2011, 2014		2009, 2010, 2011, 2013, 2015, 2018, 2019	20
3	Fan Zhendong (born 1997)	Men	2021, 2023	2017, 2023		2014, 2016, 2018, 2022, 2024	2024			2020, 2024	2016, 2018, 2019, 2020		2015, 2018, 2019, 2023	20
6	Zhang Yining (born 1981)	Women	2005, 2009	2003, 2005, 2007		2000, 2001, 2004, 2006, 2008	2004, 2008	2004		2008	2001, 2002, 2004, 2005		2007	19
6	Li Xiaoxia (born 1988)	Women	2013	2009, 2011, 2013		2006, 2008, 2012, 2014, 2016	2012			2012, 2016	2008		2007, 2009, 2010, 2011, 2013, 2015	19
6	Xu Xin (born 1990)	Men		2011, 2015	2015, 2019	2010, 2012, 2014, 2016, 2018				2016, 2020	2013		2009, 2010, 2011, 2013, 2015, 2018, 2019	19
9	Deng Yaping (born 1973)	Women	1991, 1995, 1997	1989, 1995, 1997		1993, 1995, 1997	1992, 1996	1992, 1996			1996	1992	1990, 1991, 1995	18
9	Wang Hao (born 1983)	Men	2009	2005, 2009		2004, 2006, 2008, 2010, 2012, 2014				2008, 2012	2007, 2008, 2010		2007, 2010, 2011, 2013	18
9	Ma Lin (born 1980)	Men		2007	1999, 2003	2001, 2004, 2006, 2008, 2010, 2012	2008	2004		2008	2000, 2003, 2004, 2006		2007, 2011	18
12	Zhang Jike (born 1988)	Men	2011, 2013	2015		2010, 2012, 2014, 2016	2012			2012, 2016	2011, 2014		2009, 2010, 2013, 2015	16
12	Wang Liqin (born 1978)	Men	2001, 2005, 2007	2001, 2003	2005, 2007	2001, 2004, 2006, 2008		2000		2008			2007, 2011, 2013	16
12	Guo Yue (born 1988)	Women	2007	2009, 2011, 2013	2005, 2007	2004, 2006, 2008, 2012				2008, 2012			2007, 2009, 2010, 2011	16
15	Chen Meng (born 1994)	Women		2023		2014, 2016, 2018, 2022, 2024	2020, 2024			2020, 2024	2020		2015, 2019, 2023	14
16	Sun Yingsha (born 2000)	Women	2023	2019, 2021	2021, 2023	2022, 2024			2024	2020, 2024	2024		2019, 2023	13
17	Kong Linghui (born 1975)	Men	1995	1997, 1999, 2005		1995, 1997, 2001, 2004	2000	1996			1995			11
17	Liu Guoliang (born 1976)	Men	1999	1997, 1999	1997	1995, 1997, 2001	1996	1996			1996		1994	11
17	Qiao Hong (born 1968)	Women	1989	1989, 1995		1993, 1995		1992, 1996				1992	1990, 1991, 1995	11
17	Wang Manyu (born 1999)	Women	2021	2019, 2021		2018, 2022, 2024				2020, 2024			2018, 2019, 2023	11
21	Wang Chuqin (born 2000)	Men	2025	2019, 2023	2021, 2023	2018, 2022, 2024			2024	2024			2023	10

== Advisory Group ==
Advisors	Birthdate	Details
(China) Zhang Lei	1968 (age 57–58)	World champion Head coach of Beijing team
(China) Yin Xiao	1953 (age 72–73)	Head coach of Shandong Luneng Table Tennis Club
(China) Wang Tao	13 December 1967 (age 58)	World champion Leader of People's Liberation Army team
(China) Jin Huchen	1951 (age 74–75)	Coach from Henan
(China) Ma Wenge	27 March 1968 (age 58)	World champion Head coach of Tianjin team
(China) Yu Shentong	1968 (age 57–58)	Coach of Liaoning team
(China) Cao Yanhua	1962 (age 63–64)	World champion Principal of Shanghai Cao Yanhua Table Tennis School
(China) Wang Liqin	18 June 1978 (age 48)	World champion Head of Table Tennis & Badminton Center of Shanghai Sports Bureau
(China) Ma Lin	19 February 1980 (age 46)	World champion Head of Table Tennis & Badminton Center of Guangdong Sports Bureau; Head coach of Guangdong team
(China) Qiao Yunping	3 September 1968 (age 58)	World champion Deputy director of Shandong Sports Bureau
(China) Jin Lufang	1960 (age 65–66)	Coach from Jiangsu team
(China) Dai Tianyun		Head of Table Tennis & Badminton Center of Sichuan Sports Bureau
(China) Wang Fei	1975 (age 50–51)	Head coach of Heilongjiang team
(China) Liu Yanbin		From Beijing
(China) Li Xiaodong	20 August 1952 (age 74)	Former Coach of China (1988-2003)
(China) Ren Guoqiang	1954 (age 71–72)	Former Coach of China (1985-2015)

== Medal count ==
Event	Gold	Silver	Bronze	Total
World Table Tennis Championships	133	98	151.5	382.5
Asian Table Tennis Championships	121	74	103.5	298.5
Asian Junior & Cadet Championships	118	82	73	273
ITTF World Youth Championships	80	42	57	179
ITTF World Tour Grand Finals	59	42	51	152
Asian Games	61	34	26	121
Table Tennis World Cup	60	33	23	116
Asian Cup Table Tennis Tournament	48	43	15	106
Summer Universiade	36	12	16	64
Summer Olympics	28	17	8	53
East Asian Games	11	6	1	18
Asian Youth Games	6	5	0	11
Summer Youth Olympics	4	0	0	4
Total	765	482	525	1,778

== See also ==
- List of China table tennis squads at the Olympics
