= ITTF Hall of Fame =

This page lists the members inducted in the ITTF Hall of Fame – founded in 1993 – in the order as they appear in the official hall of fame maintained by the International Table Tennis Federation. The ITTF Hall of Fame includes both table tennis players and officers.

To qualify for the ITTF Hall of Fame, an athlete must have won a minimum of five gold medals in Table Tennis World Championships, Olympic Games, and Paralympic Games. For more detailed information, see the page of each player.

== Inducted in 1993 ==
- (Hungary) (England) Viktor Barna
- (Austria) (England) Richard Bergmann
- (Hungary) (United States) Laszlo Bellak
- (Hungary) István Kelen
- (United States) James McClure: inducted as officer.
- (Hungary) Zoltán Mechlovits
- (Hungary) Miklós Szabados
- (Czechoslovakia) Bohumil Váňa
- (Hungary) Mária Mednyánszky
- (Czechoslovakia) Marie Kettnerová
- (Hungary) Anna Sipos
- (Czechoslovakia) Věra Votrubcová

== Inducted in 1995 ==
- (Czechoslovakia) Ivan Andreadis
- (England) Ivor Montagu: inducted as officer.
- (Hungary) Ferenc Sidó
- (Czechoslovakia) Ladislav Štípek
- (Czechoslovakia) František Tokár
- (Romania) Angelica Rozeanu
- (Hungary) Gizella Farkas
- (Romania) Ella Zeller

== Inducted in 1997 ==
- (Japan) Ichiro Ogimura
- (England) Johnny Leach
- (Japan) Toshiaki Tanaka
- (Wales) Roy Evans: inducted as officer.
- (England) A.K. Vint: inducted as officer.
- (Japan) Fujie Eguchi
- (Japan) Kimiyo Matsuzaki

== Inducted in 1999 ==
- (China) Zhuang Zedong
- (China) Lin Huiqing
- (China) Li Furong

== Inducted in 2001 ==
- (China) Guo Yuehua
- (China) Jiang Jialiang
- (China) Zhang Xielin
- (China) Liang Geliang
- (China) Cao Yanhua
- (Japan) Nobuhiko Hasegawa

== Inducted in 2003 ==
- (Sweden) Jan-Ove Waldner
- (Sweden) Jörgen Persson
- (Sweden) Peter Karlsson
- (China) Wang Tao
- (China) Deng Yaping
- (China) Wang Nan
- (China) Ge Xinai
- (China) Liu Wei

== Inducted in 2005 ==
- (China) Liu Guoliang
- (China) Wang Liqin
- (China) Li Ju
- (China) Qiao Hong
- (China) Zhang Yining

== Inducted in 2010 ==
- (China) Xu Yinsheng: inducted as officer.
- (China) Cai Zhenhua
- (Japan) Kazuko Ito
- (Austria) Trude Pritzi
- (South Korea) Hyun Jung-Hwa
- (China) Zhang Deying
- (China) Kong Linghui
- (China) Ma Lin
- (China) Chen Qi
- (China) Wang Hao
- (China) Guo Yue

== Inducted in 2013 ==
- (China) Li Xiaoxia
- (China) Ma Long
- (China) Zhang Jike

== Inducted in 2016 ==
- (China) Ding Ning
- (China) Liu Shiwen
- (China) Xu Xin

== See also ==
- List of table tennis players
