= Takao Nohira =

Japanese table tennis player

Personal information
- Nationality: Japan
- Born: 1943 or 1944
- Died: 12 May 2013 (aged 69)
Medal record
Representing Japan
World Table Tennis Championships
Silver medal – second place	1965	Men's Team

Takao Nohira (野平 孝雄, Nohira Takao) is a former international table tennis player from Japan.

He won a silver medal at the 1965 World Table Tennis Championships in the Swaythling Cup (men's team event) with Koji Kimura, Ken Konaka, Ichiro Ogimura and Hiroshi Takahashi.

== See also ==
- List of table tennis players
- List of World Table Tennis Championships medalists
