= Pisen =

Chinese consumer electronics company

- Native name: 品胜
- Industry: Consumer electronics
- Founded: 2003
- Founder: Will Zhao
- Headquarters: Shenzhen
- Products: Power banks; Charging cables; Portable power stations; Earbuds; Headphones
- Brands: Pisen
- Website: www.pisengroup.com

Pisen is a Chinese consumer electronics company headquartered in Shenzhen, Guangdong. Founded in 2003, Pisen is one of the first companies to develop and commercialize power banks. The company's current product lineup includes power support for smart products, audio equipment, electronic accessories, smart household appliances, and portable power stations. Pisen also manufactures batteries for mobile devices, camera batteries and chargers, as well as alkaline batteries and nickel–metal hydride (NiMH) rechargeable batteries.

== History ==
In 2003, Pisen was founded in Shenzhen, Guangdong.

In 2004, Pisen developed the prototype of "power bank", which was later selected as the designated equipment for China's "7+2" Antarctic Expedition Team.

In 2016, Pisen became an official sponsor of the CBA Sichuan men's basketball team for three consecutive seasons.

In 2019, Pisen established a strategic partnership with the China national table tennis team. In the same year, the company initiated the "PISEN MORE" ecosystem, with the aim of establishing an interconnected network of products and services.

In 2020, Pisen entered the renewable energy market, introducing products such as portable power stations, electric vehicle (EV) chargers, and C&I energy storage systems.

On August 27, 2025, Pisen opened its first U.S. retail store in Los Angeles, California.

On October 15, 2025, Pisen opened its first flagship store in Bangkok, Thailand.

== Awards and recognition ==
2020 iF Design Award — Ultra-thin Wireless Charging Pad

2016 iF Design Award — USB Multifunctional Socket

2015 Red Dot Award Honorable Mention — Charger for Warming Hands
