= Tsunao Isomura =

Japanese table tennis player

Personal information
- Nationality: Japan
Medal record
Representing Japan
World Table Tennis Championships
Silver medal – second place	1965	Women's Team

Tsunao Isomura is a former international table tennis player from Japan.

== Table tennis career ==
She won a silver medal in the 1965 World Table Tennis Championships in the Corbillon Cup (women's team event) with Naoko Fukatsu, Masako Seki and Noriko Yamanaka for Japan.

She also won two Asian Games medals.

== See also ==
- List of table tennis players
- List of World Table Tennis Championships medalists
