= Glenn Cowan =

American table tennis player (1952–2004)

- Glenn Cowan receiving a silk print from Zhuang Zedong, 1971

Personal information
- Nationality: American
- Born: 25 August 1952 New Rochelle, New York
- Died: 6 April 2004 (aged 51) Los Angeles County, California

Sport
- Sport: Table tennis

Glenn L. Cowan (August 25, 1952 – April 6, 2004) was an American table tennis player.

== Biography ==
Cowan was from New Rochelle, New York, and was Jewish. His parents were Phil (a television executive, who died at age 48) and Fran Cowan. The family later moved to Bel Air, California. He attended University High School.

In 1964, at age 12, Cowan won the singles for his age under-13s group in the Eastern regional junior championships. He won the 1967 U.S. Open junior under-17s table tennis championships. Two years later he won another U.S. Open.

One day during the 31st World Table Tennis Championship in Nagoya, Japan, American team member Cowan missed his own bus and in his haste got onto the bus of the Chinese team. Unlike his team mates, who ignored Cowan, player Zhuang Zedong greeted him and presented him with a silk-screen portrait of the Huangshan Mountains, thus starting the so-called ping-pong diplomacy.

Cowan was arguably one of two critical personalities, the other being Zhuang Zedong, in the 1971 ping-pong diplomacy which helped paved the way for President Richard Nixon's visit to Beijing in 1972. He was the youngest player on the first U.S. table tennis team to compete in 1971's “Ping-pong diplomacy” tour to China.

Cowan studied at UCLA and Santa Monica College (1969 to 1972). He became a junior high school teacher. He was diagnosed, variously, as being bipolar and schizophrenic. He was married briefly. He lived in Culver City.

He died on April 6, 2004 at 51 years of age of complications during heart surgery.

== Accolades ==
In 2008 he was inducted into the Southern California Jewish Sports Hall of Fame. He was posthumously inducted into the California Table Tennis Hall of Fame in 2014.

On October 10, 2024 he was inducted into the United States Table Tennis Hall of Fame
