= Lesley Bell =

British table tennis player

Personal information
- Nationality: England
- Born: 1946 (age 79–80)
Medal record
Representing England
World Table Tennis Championships
Bronze medal – third place	1965	Women's Team

Lesley Bell is a former international table tennis player from England.

== Table tennis career ==
She represented England at the 1963 World Table Tennis Championships in the Corbillon Cup (women's team event) alongside Diane Rowe and Mary Shannon.

Two years later, she won a bronze medal at the 1965 World Table Tennis Championships in the Corbillon Cup (women's team event) alongside Irene Ogus, Rowe and Shannon.

She represented Essex at the county level and, in 1962, became the youngest female representative for England at the senior level, alongside Ann Haydon, at the age of 15. Her mother, Brenda Bell, was a three-time England Veteran champion.

== Personal life ==
She married Peter Radford in 1966. Her mother, Brenda Bell, was a three-time England Veteran champion. Her husband, Peter Radford, has also won the England Veteran Championships. She has two children, Allan and Linda Radford, who competed at the county and international levels respectively.

== See also ==
- List of England players at the World Team Table Tennis Championships
