= Ping-pong diplomacy =

1970s exchange of American and Chinese table tennis players

Ping-pong diplomacy (Chinese: 乒乓外交; pinyin: Pīngpāng wàijiāo) refers to the exchange of table tennis (ping-pong) players between the United States and the People's Republic of China in the early 1970s. Considered a turning point in relations between the United States and the People's Republic of China, it began during the 1971 World Table Tennis Championships in Nagoya, Japan, as a result of an encounter between players Glenn Cowan (of the US) and Zhuang Zedong (of the PRC). These interactions sparked diplomatic breakthrough, by signaling that both sides were willing to interact and engage in dialogue. The exchange and its promotion helped people in each country to recognize the humanity in the people of the other country, and it paved the way for President Richard Nixon's visit to Beijing in 1972 and the Shanghai Communiqué. The Shanghai Communiqué was a pivotal diplomatic document issued on February 28, 1972, during President Richard Nixon's visit to China. It marked a significant shift in U.S.-China relations, as both countries acknowledged their differences while committing to improving their relationship, ultimately setting the stage for détente between the two nations. Ping-Pong diplomacy occurred during a period of tension between the United States, the Soviet Union, and China, and it helped create an opportunity for the United States and China to begin improving diplomatic relations after decades of hostility.

== History ==
=== Background ===
The United States viewed the People's Republic of China as an aggressor nation and enforced an economic containment policy including an embargo on the PRC, following its entry into the Korean War in 1950. The exchange of table tennis players helped create a symbolic moment of goodwill that eventually contributed to President Richard Nixon's historic visit to China in 1972. After approximately 20 years of neither diplomatic nor economic relations, both countries finally saw an advantage in opening up to each other: China viewed closer relations with the United States as a beneficial counter to its increasingly tense relationship with the Soviet Union, which had seen the outbreak of a series of bloody border incidents, while the U.S. sought closer relations with China as leverage in its peace negotiations with North Vietnam. "However, when Mao wanted to improve relations with the United States, he needed to prepare the Chinese public psychologically and politically."

From the early years of the People's Republic, sports had played an important role in diplomacy, incorporating the slogan "Friendship First, Competition Second". Xu Yinsheng, the coach for the Chinese national team, stated "The Premier [Zhou Enlai] constantly reminded us that we were going out not just to compete, but to make friends...to further the peace of humanity" During the isolationist years, athletes were among the few PRC nationals who were allowed to travel overseas.

=== 1971 World Table Tennis Championships ===
The more radical among China's leadership opposed sending a team to the 1971 World Table Tennis Championships in Nagoya, Japan, and many of the players believed that China should not send a team due to political considerations. Ultimately, Mao Zedong reviewed and approved the plan submitted by the team. Zhou Enlai instructed its members not to conduct propaganda to foreigners and that while they should not initiate conversations with the American team, they could shake the hands of their American counterparts at matches. Once in Japan, the Chinese players engaged in conversations after they were greeted by their American counterparts. On March 30, 1971, American player Graham Steenhoven and the head of the Chinese delegation Song Zhong had two short conversations. Steenhoven told Song that the United States had just lifted its ban on travel to China. He also expressed his regret that the ban meant that the American team did not attend the 1961 World Table Tennis Championships (which were held in China) and stated that he hoped the U.S. team could compete in China in the future.

The Chinese delegation relayed this interaction to the Ministry of Foreign Affairs and the National Sports Commission, requesting instructions on how to respond. The MFA and the Commission did not respond positively, viewing it as inappropriate to invite American athletes to China before inviting American leftists. Zhou Enlai agreed, but requested that Chinese officials with the team in Japan obtain the American delegation's address and inform them of China's position on the Taiwan issue. Mao Zedong initially approved the resulting report, but two days later instructed the MFA to invite the American team to visit China.

Tim Boggan, who went to China along with the U.S. Table Tennis Team, wrote that three incidents may have triggered their invitation from China. Welshman H. Roy Evans, then President of the International Table Tennis Federation, claimed that he visited China prior to the 31st World Table Tennis Championship and suggested to non-Chinese sports authorities and Premier Zhou Enlai that China should take steps to get in contact with the world through international sport events after the Cultural Revolution. Evans' suggestion aligned with China's interest in using sports as a tool for spreading their socialist internationalism, a strategy that became more prominent in the following decades. Furthermore, the American player Leah "Miss Ping" Neuberger, the 1956 World Mixed Doubles Champion and nine-time U.S. Open Women's Singles Champion, was traveling at the time with the Canadian Table Tennis Team that had been invited by China to visit the country. China diplomatically extended its approval of Leah Neuberger's application for a visa to the entire American team.

The third incident, perhaps the most likely trigger, was the unexpected but dramatic meeting between the American player Glenn Cowan and the Chinese team captain Zhuang Zedong, a three-time world champion and winner of many table tennis events. On the morning of the championships, Cowan over-slept and missed U.S. national team's bus, so he hopped on the next bus to the stadium, which happened to belong to China's national team. Many of the Chinese players were initially suspicious of Cowan, but Zhuang Zedong had read that Mao Zedong had given an interview to an American reporter, so he decided he could also talk to an American. Zhuang approached Cowan on the bus, shook his hand, and spoke to him through an interpreter. He presented him with a silk-screen portrait of Huangshan Mountains, a famous product of Hangzhou. Cowan wanted to give something back, but all he could find from his bag was a comb. The American hesitantly replied, "I can't give you a comb. I wish I could give you something, but I can't." The next day, Cowan, as a self-described hippie, presented Zhuang with a T-shirt with a red, white and blue peace emblem flag and the words "Let It Be". Zhuang Zedong described the incident in a 2007 talk at the USC U.S.–China Institute. When they exited the bus, journalists snapped photos of the two together. Two days later, the U.S. team received an official invitation to travel to China and play exhibition matches against the Chinese team. The United States accepted the invitation, and both sides rushed to make arrangements.

This World Table Tennis Championships marked the return of China's participation after a six-year absence. When the Chinese team and Cowan walked off the bus, journalists who were following the Chinese team took photographs. In the political climate of the 1960s, the sight of an athlete of Communist China with an athlete of the United States was sure to garner attention.

When a journalist asked Cowan, "Mr. Cowan, would you like to visit China?", he answered, "Well, I'd like to see any country I haven't seen before--Argentina, Australia, China, ... Any country I haven't seen before." "But what about China in particular? Would you like to go there?" "Of course," said Glenn Cowan.

During an interview in 2002 with the TV personality Chen Luyu, Zhuang Zedong told more of the story: "The trip on the bus took 15 minutes, and I hesitated for 10 minutes. I grew up with the slogan 'Down with the American imperialism!' And during the Cultural Revolution, the string of class struggle was tightened unprecedentedly, and I was asking myself, 'Is it okay to have anything to do with your No. 1 enemy?'" Zhuang recalled remembering that Chairman Mao Zedong met Edgar Snow on the Rostrum of Tiananmen on the National Day in 1970 and said to Snow that China should now place its hope on American people. Zhuang looked in his bag and first went through some pins, badges with Mao's head, silk handkerchiefs, and fans. But he felt these were not decent enough to be a good gift. He finally picked the silk portrait of Huangshan Mountains. On the following day, many Japanese newspapers carried photographs of Zhuang Zedong and Glenn Cowan. In the days following the tournament, Zedong once again surprised the world by inviting the American table tennis team to visit China and participate in a regional table tennis competition.

=== American team visits China ===
On April 10, 1971, the American team, consisting of men and woman of all ages from high-schoolers to professors, and accompanying journalists became the first official American delegation to set foot in the Chinese capital since 1949. The U.S. team spent 10-days traveling to Tianjin, Guangzhou, Beijing, and Shanghai, visiting national monuments, attending banquets, playing exhibition matches, and observing the drastic cultural differences. Upon arrival, the U.S. team was greeted by Premier Zhou Enlai and in the proceeding days, several exhibition matches took place, and those in Beijing hosted 20,000 in attendance. The American team was initially shocked by how different everything was in China. A member of the team, Tim Boggan, said "Everything is different from anything I'd ever seen. The streets were different, the food was different."

The trip also marked the return of American journalism to China, American reporters having been ousted shortly after the founding of the PRC and a prior effort to invite American reporters having been rebuffed by U.S. President Dwight D. Eisenhower. Nonetheless, cracks in the Chinese facade showed as "during one stopover, team president Graham Steenhoven noticed that a "Welcome American Team" banner had been hung over a wall painted with the words "Down With the Yankee Oppressors and Their Running Dogs!""

The meeting was facilitated by the National Committee on United States – China Relations. Prior to the visit by the American table tennis players, eleven Americans were admitted into the PRC for one week because they all professed affiliation with the Black Panther Party, which followed a Maoist political line.

On the first day of the American team's visit, Zhou arranged for them to watch a performance of The Red Detachment of Women, a popular model play. The American and Chinese teams played exhibition matches on the second day. Based on the principle of "friendship first, competition second," Zhou instructed that the Chinese team should not win all the games. It won four of the seven matches.

The American team visited significant sites, including Tsinghua University, an industrial museum, a people's commune, the Great Wall, Tiananmen Square, and the Summer Palace.

On April 14, Zhou met with the American team. During the brief meeting, Zhou told the team that they were friends of China and that their visit was just the beginning of more Americans visiting China. He concluded the meeting by stating that the Chinese and American peoples used to have frequent exchanges and praising the American players for "opening the door for the friendly exchange between the two nations."

During the visit, Nixon made an official statement regarding the ban on travel between U.S.-China and the currency controls in place. Nixon had revoked the travel ban from those who are from the People's Republic of China. Those from the PRC who wanted to travel to the United States had visas expedited after Nixon's actions regarding United States and Chinese relations. Nixon's decision of modifying the currency controls allowed for people of the PRC to use United States currency. Other actions Nixon took, such as lifting the restriction on American oil companies providing fuel for ships and or aircraft travelling to and from China and the importation and deportation of Chinese and American goods, were also listed in the official statement made.

=== Chinese team visits the United States ===
During their April 1971 visit, the American team invited the Chinese team to visit the United States. In early 1972, Zhou told White House press secretary Ron Ziegler (who was in China preparing for President Richard Nixon's visit) that the Chinese team could visit that spring. In February 1972, Nixon visited the People's Republic, the first time in history that an American president had traveled to mainland China.

The Chinese team came to the United States on April 12, 1972. They were the first group of official Chinese visitors to the United States since 1949. The Chinese team toured cities in Michigan, Williamsburg, Washington D.C., Memphis, and Los Angeles. During these visits, the team played ping-pong with students at schools and colleges. The Chinese believed an alliance with the United States would mitigate any threat from Soviet Union; Nixon sought to increase the divide between China and the Soviet Union. Nixon met the team on April 18, telling them that "the big winner, because of this people-to-people contact you are initiating between our two peoples, will be friendship between the people of the United States and the people of the People's Republic of China."

The meeting with Nixon had nearly been canceled following the United States bombing of Hanoi and Haiphong on April 16. Although Zhou sought to cancel the meeting between the team and Nixon, Mao concluded that the visit was unofficial and to cancel the meeting would be undiplomatic given that the previous year the American team had met with Chinese leaders.

== Reactions ==
Upon his return to the United States, one of the American players, Glenn Cowan, told reporters that the Chinese were very similar to people in the U.S. He said:

The people are just like us. They are real, they're genuine, they got feeling. I made friends, I made genuine friends, you see. The country is similar to America, but still very different. It's beautiful. They got the Great Wall, they got plains over there. They got an ancient palace, the parks, there's streams, and they got ghosts that haunt; there's all kinds of, you know, animals. The country changes from the south to the north. The people, they have a, a unity. They really believe in their Maoism.

After the American team's visit, China welcomed Americans from diverse backgrounds to visit China, beginning with biologists Arthur Galston (Yale University) and Ethan Singer (Massachusetts Institute of Technology).They became the first American scientists to visit China since 1949. Galston and Singer sent their visa applications to the Embassy of China in Ottawa, Canada, and their applications were approved while they were visiting North Vietnam. Galston and Singer immediately traveled to China, where they met with Zhou on May 19, 1971. Zhou sought to address American concerns about China by telling them that while the Pacific Ocean was a small pond for the United States, it "was still a huge ocean for the Chinese to cross." Zhou stated that China had no desire to be a superpower or send soldiers abroad. Galston and Singer conveyed these messages to the American public through a report written by The New York Times a few days after their meeting with Zhou.

On February 28, 1972, during President Nixon and Henry Kissinger's visit to Shanghai, the Shanghai Communiqué was issued between the U.S. and the PRC. The Communiqué noted that both nations would work towards the normalization of their relations regarding economic and cultural contacts.

== The response to Nixon's visit ==
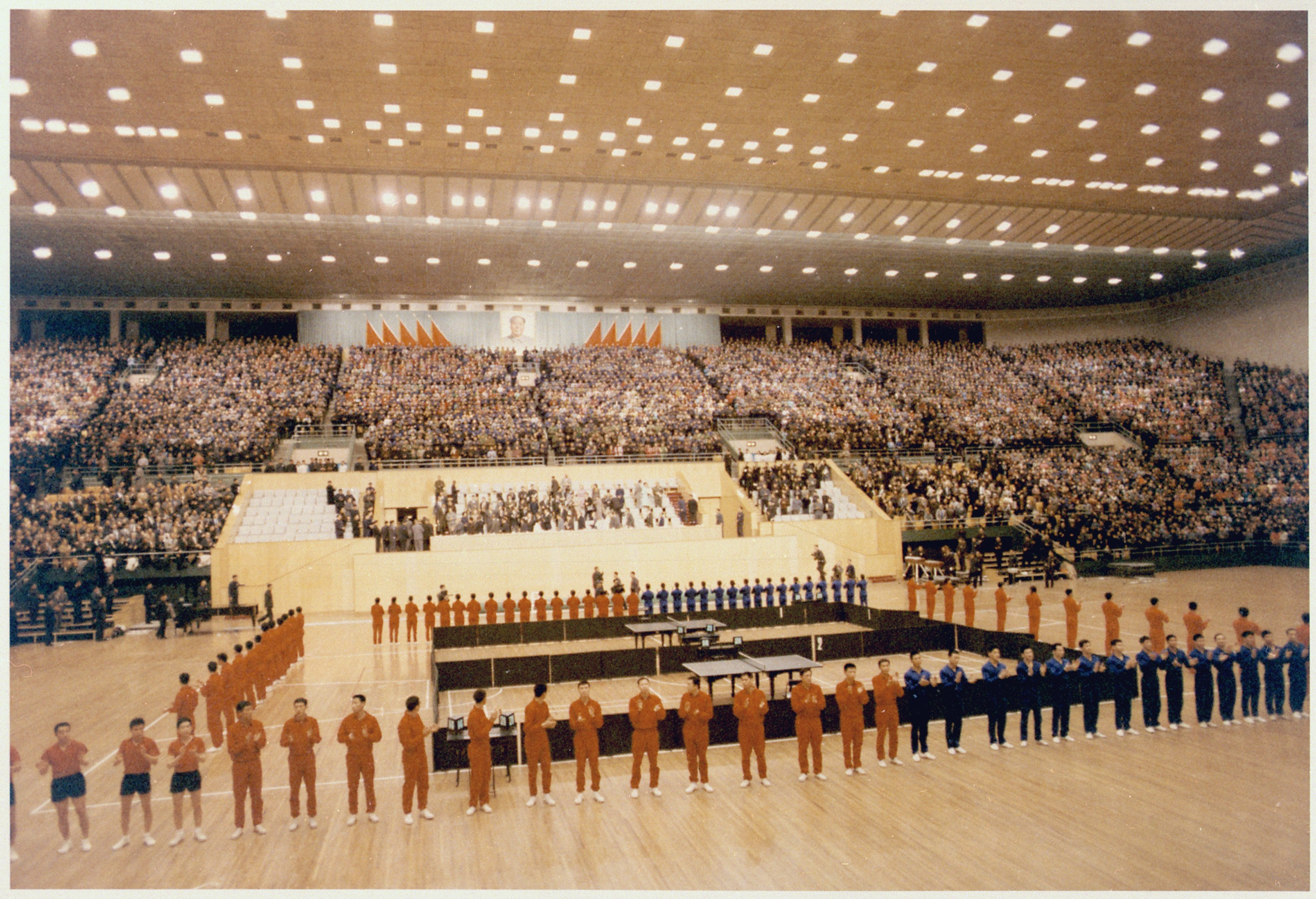
Nixon attending a ping-pong exhibition in Beijing

Two months after Richard Nixon's visit, Zhuang Zedong visited the U.S. as the head of a Chinese table-tennis delegation, April 12–30, 1972. Notably, the Chinese delegation played a team of University of Maryland, College Park students at the university's Cole Field House on April 17, 1972. The president's daughter Tricia Nixon Cox was in the stands. Also on the itinerary were Canada, Mexico and Peru. Efforts to employ "ping-pong diplomacy" were not always successful, such as when the All Indonesia Table Tennis Association (PTMSI) refused China's invitation in October 1971, claiming that accepting the PRC's offer would improve the PRC's reputation. Because neither Soviet athletes nor journalists appeared in China following the appearance of the American players and journalists, one speculation is that the act showed the equal scorn of both countries towards the USSR.

== Korean ping-pong diplomacy ==
=== 1991 United Korean team ===
Another example of Ping Pong Diplomacy occurred during the 1991 World Table Tennis Championships in Chiba, Japan, where a unified Korean team played together for the first time since the Korean War.

The diplomatic efforts leading to the formation of this unified team were led by then-International Table Tennis Federation President, Ichiro Ogimura.

Prior to the championships, Ogimura visited South Korea 20 times and traveled to North Korea 15 times to plead for a unified team from the Korean peninsula. Ogimura also worked with local Japanese government heads to create joint training camps in the cities of Nagano, Nagaoka and Chiba, and secured agreement from the ITTF for North Korea and South Korea to compete under the unified name of "Korea".

The Korean team played under a white flag depicting the Korean peninsula in blue and used the Korean folksong, Arirang, rather than the national anthem of either the North or the South.

The competition saw the Korean team win one gold medal, one silver and two bronze medals.

=== Further examples ===
This action has since been repeated. At the 2018 World Team Table Tennis Championships, the two Koreas entered separate teams in the competition but, when they were paired against each other at the quarter-final of the women's event, they negotiated instead to field a joint team for the semi-final.

In the 2024 Summer Olympics, the North and South Korean mixed ping-pong teams took a selfie together along with the Chinese team after the table tennis finals.

== Legacy ==
Ping-pong diplomacy became one of the most prominent examples of people's diplomacy in the context of China-United States relations.

- In 1988, table tennis became an Olympic sport.
- Ping-pong diplomacy was referenced in the 1994 film Forrest Gump. After suffering injuries in battle, Forrest develops an aptitude for the sport and joins the U.S. Army team—eventually competing against Chinese teams on a goodwill tour.
- During the week of July 8, 2011, a three-day ping-pong diplomacy event was held at the Richard Nixon Presidential Library and Museum in Yorba Linda, California. Original members of both the Chinese and American ping-pong teams from 1971 were present and competed again.
- The effect from this event not only simplified relations of US-China, but also set the standard for future breakthroughs for international relations in the world.
- This even demonstrated how cultural and people to people exchanges can help de- escalate political tensions and open new channels for dialogue and engagement between nations.

== See also ==
- Politics and sports
- 1999 Baltimore Orioles – Cuban national baseball team exhibition series
- 2008 New York Philharmonic visit to North Korea
- Summit Series
- Panda diplomacy
- History of foreign relations of China
