= Wang Jiasheng (table tennis) =

Chinese table tennis player

Personal information
- Nationality: China
- Born: 23 December 1943 (age 82)

Sport
- Sport: Table tennis
Medal record
Men's table tennis
Representing China
World Championships
Gold medal – first place	1963 Prague	Team
Bronze medal – third place	1961 Beijing	Doubles
Bronze medal – third place	1963 Prague	Doubles
Bronze medal – third place	1965 Ljubljana	Doubles

Wang Jiasheng (Chinese: 王家声; Wade–Giles: Wang Chia-sheng; born 23 December 1943) is a former Chinese table tennis player and coach. He was a member of the Chinese team that won the men's team gold medal at the 1963 World Table Tennis Championships in Prague.

== Biography ==
Wang was born in Bijie, Guizhou Province, and became a table tennis player in 1958. A year later, he was chosen into the Chinese national team. At the 1963 World Table Tennis Championships in Prague, 19-year-old Wang Jiasheng was a member of the Chinese team (along with Zhuang Zedong, Li Furong, Xu Yinsheng, and Zhang Xielin) that defeated Japan to win the men's team championship, for the second time in Chinese history. Wang also won the bronze medal three times in men's doubles of the 1961, 1963, and 1965 world championships, with partners Zhou Lansun and Li Furong.

After retiring from his playing career, Wang worked at two factories in Guiyang, before returning to the national team as a coach in June 1972. In 1975, he returned to Guizhou and served as deputy director of the Guizhou provincial sports committee. He retired in 2007. He was a torch-bearer during the torch relay of the 2008 Beijing Olympics.

== See also ==
- List of table tennis players
- List of World Table Tennis Championships medalists
