= Irene Ogus =

English table tennis player

Personal information
- Nationality: England
- Born: 1944 (age 81–82) Brentford, England
Medal record
Representing England
World Table Tennis Championships
Bronze medal – third place	1965	Women's Team

Irene Ogus is a female former international table tennis player from England.

== Table tennis career ==
She won a bronze medal at the 1965 World Table Tennis Championships in the Corbillon Cup (women's team event) with Diane Rowe, Lesley Bell and Mary Shannon.

She also won a gold medal in the team event at the 1964 European Table Tennis Championships.

At the 1969 Maccabiah Games in Israel, she won a silver medal in singles, and with Leah Neuberger won a gold medal in doubles, and with Jeff Ingber won a gold medal in mixed doubles.

== See also ==
- List of England players at the World Team Table Tennis Championships
