= Feng Mengya =

Chinese table tennis player

Personal information
- Nationality: China
- Born: 1947 (age 78–79)
Medal record
Representing China
World Table Tennis Championships
Bronze medal – third place	1965	women's doubles

Feng Mengya (Chinese: 冯梦雅, born 1947) is a female Chinese former international table tennis player.

== Table tennis career ==
She won a bronze medal at the 1965 World Table Tennis Championships in the women's doubles with Li Li.

== See also ==
- List of table tennis players
- List of World Table Tennis Championships medalists
