= Li Jingguang =

Chinese table tennis player

Li Jingguang (Li Ching-kuang)
Personal information
- Nationality: China
- Born: November 1947
- Died: 16 June 2000 (aged 52)
Medal record
Representing China
World Table Tennis Championships
Gold medal – first place	1971	Men's Team
Silver medal – second place	1973	Men's Team

Li Jingguang also known as Li Ching-kuang, (November 1947 – 16 June 2000) was a male former international table tennis player from China.

== Table tennis career ==
He won two medals at the World Table Tennis Championships; a gold medal in the Swaythling Cup (men's team event) at the 1971 and a silver medal two years later in the Swaythling Cup.

== See also ==
- List of table tennis players
- List of World Table Tennis Championships medalists
