= Zhou Lansun =

Chinese table tennis player

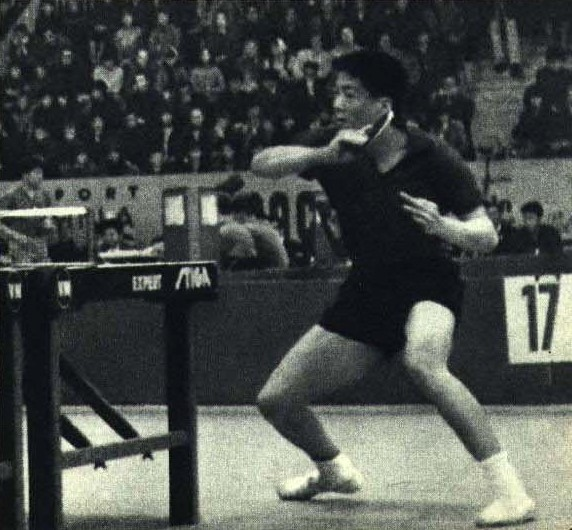
- Zhou Lansun at the 1965 World Table Tennis Championships

Personal information
- Nationality: China
- Born: 23 January 1939 Hangzhou, Zhejiang, China
- Died: 23 December 2000 (aged 61) Beijing, China

Sport
- Sport: Table tennis
Medal record
Men's table tennis
Representing China
World Championships
Gold medal – first place	1965 Ljubljana	Team
Bronze medal – third place	1965 Ljubljana	Singles
Bronze medal – third place	1965 Ljubljana	Doubles
Bronze medal – third place	1961 Beijing	Doubles

Zhou Lansun (Chinese: 周兰荪; Wade–Giles: Chou Lan-sun; 23 January 1939 – 23 October 2000) was a Chinese table tennis player and coach. He was a member of the Chinese team that won the men's team gold medal at the 1965 World Table Tennis Championships in Ljubljana. As coach he trained several world champions and won the national honorary sports medal four times.

== Biography ==
Zhou was born in Hangzhou, Zhejiang Province on 23 January 1939, with ancestry in Shangrao, Jiangxi. He was chosen for the Shanxi provincial table tennis team in 1957, and the Chinese national team the following year. He won a bronze medal in the men's doubles at the 1961 World Table Tennis Championships in Beijing, with partner Wang Jiasheng. At the 1965 World Table Tennis Championships in Ljubljana, Yugoslavia, he was a member (with Li Furong, Xu Yinsheng, Zhang Xielin, and Zhuang Zedong) of the Chinese team that won the men's team gold medal. At the same event, he also won bronze medals in the men's singles and in the men's doubles (with Yu Changchun).

Zhou became a coach of the Chinese national team in 1973, and trained several male and female world champions, including Cao Yanhua, Guo Yuehua, Chen Xinhua, Zhang Deying, and Qi Baoxiang. In Cao Yanhua's memoirs, she called Zhou almost a "devil", and recalled that though she fainted several times during training, he made her continue practicing after she regained consciousness. His training regimen was highly effective though, and Cao won her first national championship after only two months of training under Zhou, which she called miraculous. She went on to win multiple gold medals in world championships, and after winning two gold medals at the 1985 World Championships, she hung one of them around Zhou's neck. Zhou won the national honorary sports medal four times.

Zhou also coached Chiang Peng-lung, who became one of the best players in Taiwan, and later he coached the Australian national table tennis team.

Zhou's daughter Shirley Zhou is a former member of the Australian national Table Tennis team, who competed at the 1996 and 2000 Olympic Games.

In late 2000, Zhou died of an illness in Beijing, at the age of 61.
