= Liang Lizhen =

Chinese table tennis player

Liang Lizhen (Liang Li-chen)
Personal information
- Nationality: China
- Born: 1945
- Died: 27 January 2017 (aged 71–72)

Sport
- Sport: Table tennis
Medal record
Women's table tennis
Representing China
World Championships
Bronze medal – third place	1965 Ljubljana	Doubles
Bronze medal – third place	1965 Ljubljana	Mixed
Gold medal – first place	1965 Ljubljana	Team
Bronze medal – third place	1963 Prague	Team
Bronze medal – third place	1961 Beijing	Doubles

Liang Lizhen (Chinese: 梁丽珍; 1945 – 27 January 2017), also known as Liang Li-chen, was a table tennis player from China.

== Table tennis career ==
From 1961 to 1965, she won five medals in doubles, and team events in the World Table Tennis Championships.

In the 1961 World Table Tennis Championships, she won a doubles bronze medal with Han Yuzhen. Two years later she won another bronze at the 1963 World Table Tennis Championships in the Corbillon Cup (women's team event) for China.

Her finest moment came when during the 1965 World Table Tennis Championships where she won three medals; a bronze in the mixed doubles with Zhuang Zedong, another bronze in the doubles with Li Henan and a gold medal in the Corbillon Cup with Li Henan, Lin Huiqing and Zheng Minzhi.
