= Li Henan =

Chinese table tennis player and coach

Li Henan (Li Ho-nan)
Personal information
- Nationality: China
- Born: 1943 (age 82–83)
Medal record
Representing China
World Table Tennis Championships
Gold medal – first place	1965	Women's Team
Bronze medal – third place	1965	Women's Doubles

Li Henan (Chinese: 李赫男; Wade–Giles: Li Ho-nan; born 1943) is a former Chinese table tennis player and coach. She was one of the four members of the Chinese team that won China's first women's team gold medal at the 1965 World Table Tennis Championships in Ljubljana.

== Biography ==
Li was born in Shanghai, and was chosen into the Chinese national table tennis team in 1960. At the 1965 World Table Tennis Championships in Ljubljana, Yugoslavia, she was a member of the Chinese teams (together with Lin Huiqing, Zheng Minzhi, and Liang Lizhen; coach Rong Guotuan) that defeated Japan to win the women's team championship for the first time in the history of Chinese table tennis.

She also won the bronze in women's doubles with partner Liang Lizhen. In the 1966 Chinese National Table Tennis Championships, Li won the gold medals in both women's doubles and mixed doubles. After retiring from her playing career, she became the head coach of the national women's team and trained future world champions Zhang Deying and Jiao Zhimin. She later moved to the United States.

== See also ==
- List of table tennis players
- List of World Table Tennis Championships medalists
