= Yu Changchun =

Chinese table tennis player

Yu Changchun (Yu Chang-chun)
Personal information
- Nationality: China
- Born: 1941 (age 84–85)
Medal record
Representing China
World Table Tennis Championships
Bronze medal – third place	1965	men's doubles
Silver medal – second place	1973	mixed doubles

Yu Changchun (Chinese: 余长春, also (Yu Chang-chun), (born 1941) is a male Chinese former international table tennis player.

He won a bronze medal at the 1965 World Table Tennis Championships in the men's doubles with Zhou Lansun and a silver medal at the 1973 World Table Tennis Championships in the mixed doubles with Zheng Huaiying.

== See also ==
- List of table tennis players
- List of World Table Tennis Championships medalists
