= Wang Zhiliang =

Chinese table tennis player (1941–2020)

Personal information
- Nationality: China
- Born: 1941
- Died: 15 September 2020 (aged 78–79)
Medal record
Representing China
World Table Tennis Championships
Gold medal – first place	1963	doubles
Bronze medal – third place	1963	singles
Silver medal – second place	1965	doubles

Wang Zhiliang (Chinese: 王志良; 1941 – 15 September 2020) was a Chinese table tennis player and coach. At the 1963 World Table Tennis Championships, he and partner Zhang Xielin became the first Chinese duo to win the men's doubles gold medal in world championships.

== Biography ==
Wang was born in Xushui, Hebei Province in 1941. He studied at Tianjin University of Sport, and joined the Tianjin table tennis team in 1958. He was chosen into the Chinese national team in 1961. At the 1963 World Table Tennis Championships in Prague, he and partner Zhang Xielin became the first Chinese duo to win the men's doubles gold medal in world championships. They won the silver in the following 1965 championships in Ljubljana.

After retiring from his playing career, Wang became the head coach of the national women's table tennis team in 1970, and the Chinese women's team won three gold medals at the 1971 World Table Tennis Championships. After leaving the national team, he served as deputy director of the Tianjin municipal sports committee.

Wang married Huang Yuhuan (黄玉环), a member of the national women's table tennis team, in 1968. They have two children. Because of the political turmoil of the Cultural Revolution, the couple moved to Hong Kong to join Huang's father. They both worked as table tennis coaches in Hong Kong.

== See also ==
- List of table tennis players
- List of World Table Tennis Championships medalists
