= Hiroshi Takahashi (table tennis) =

Japanese table tennis player

Personal information
- Native name: 高橋 浩
- Nationality: Japan
- Born: 1942 (age 83–84)

Sport
- Sport: Table tennis
Medal record
Men's table tennis
Representing Japan
World Championships
Silver medal – second place	1965 Ljubljana	Team
Asian Championships
Bronze medal – third place	1964 Seoul	Singles
Silver medal – second place	1964 Seoul	Doubles
Gold medal – first place	1964 Seoul	Team
Gold medal – first place	1963 Manila	Singles
Gold medal – first place	1963 Manila	Doubles
Gold medal – first place	1963 Manila	Team

Hiroshi Takahashi (高橋 浩, Takahashi Hiroshi) is a former international table tennis player from Japan.

From 1967 to 1975 he won several medals in singles, doubles, and team events in the Asian Table Tennis Championships. He also won a silver medal in the team event at the World Table Tennis Championships in 1965.
