= Li Li (table tennis) =

Chinese table tennis player

Li Li (L'i Li-fen)
Personal information
- Nationality: China
- Born: 1947 (age 78–79)

Sport
- Sport: Table tennis
Medal record
Women's table tennis
Representing China
World Championships
Gold medal – first place	1973 Sarajevo	Mixed Doubles
Bronze medal – third place	1971 Nagoya	Singles
Silver medal – second place	1971 Nagoya	Team
Bronze medal – third place	1965 Ljubljana	Singles
Bronze medal – third place	1965 Ljubljana	Doubles
Asian Championships
Gold medal – first place	1972 Beijing	Singles
Bronze medal – third place	1972 Beijing	Mixed Doubles
Gold medal – first place	1972 Beijing	Team

Li Li (Chinese: 李莉) also known as L'i Li-fen is a former international table tennis player from China.

== Table tennis career ==
From 1965 to 1972 she won several medals in singles, doubles, and team events in the Asian Table Tennis Championships and in the World Table Tennis Championships.

Her five World Championship medals included one gold medal in the mixed doubles with Liang Geliang at the 1973 World Table Tennis Championships.

== See also ==
- List of table tennis players
- List of World Table Tennis Championships medalists
