= Masako Seki =

Japanese table tennis player (died 2019)

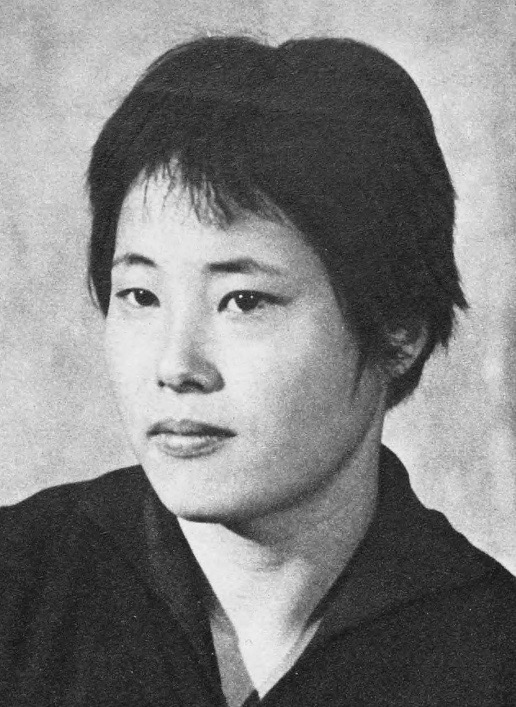

Personal information
- Full name: SEKI Masako
- Nationality: Japan
- Born: 1941 or 1942
- Died: 18 September 2019 (aged 77)

Sport
- Sport: Table tennis
Medal record
Women's table tennis
Representing Japan
World Championships
Silver medal – second place	1965 Ljubljana	Doubles
Gold medal – first place	1965 Ljubljana	Mixed Doubles
Silver medal – second place	1965 Ljubljana	Team
Gold medal – first place	1963 Prague	Doubles
Silver medal – second place	1963 Prague	Mixed Doubles
Gold medal – first place	1963 Prague	Team
Bronze medal – third place	1961 Beijing	Mixed Doubles
Gold medal – first place	1961 Beijing	Team
Asian Championships
Gold medal – first place	1964 Seoul	Singles
Gold medal – first place	1964 Seoul	Doubles
Silver medal – second place	1964 Seoul	Mixed Doubles
Gold medal – first place	1964 Seoul	Team
Gold medal – first place	1963 Manila	Doubles
Gold medal – first place	1963 Manila	Team

Masako Seki (関 正子, Seki Masako; 1941 or 1942 – September 18, 2019) was an international table tennis player from Japan.

== Table tennis career ==
From 1961 to 1965 she won several medals in singles, doubles, and team events in the World Table Tennis Championships and in the Asian Table Tennis Championships.

Her eight World Championship medals included four gold medals; two in team event, one in the doubles with Kimiyo Matsuzaki at the 1963 World Table Tennis Championships and one in the mixed doubles with Koji Kimura at the 1965 World Table Tennis Championships.

She died at the age of 77 on September 18, 2019.

== See also ==
- List of table tennis players
- List of World Table Tennis Championships medalists
