= Zheng Minzhi =

Chinese table tennis player

Zheng Minzhi (Cheng Min-chih)
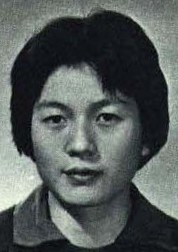
- Zheng Minzhi, 1965.

Personal information
- Nationality: China
- Born: 1945 (age 80–81)

Sport
- Sport: Table tennis
Medal record
Women's table tennis
Representing China
World Championships
Silver medal – second place	1973 Sarajevo	Corbillon Cup Team
Silver medal – second place	1971 Nagoya	Singles
Gold medal – first place	1971 Nagoya	Doubles
Silver medal – second place	1971 Nagoya	Corbillon Cup Team
Gold medal – first place	1965 Ljubljana	Doubles
Gold medal – first place	1965 Ljubljana	Corbillon Cup Team

Zheng Minzhi also known as Cheng Min-chih is a former international table tennis player from China.

== Table tennis career ==
Between 1965 and 1973 she won six medals in singles, doubles, and team events in the World Table Tennis Championships. She later became a table tennis referee and coach.

Zheng Minzhi started playing table tennis when she was 12. She was selected for a sports school at 14, she and later attended a national sports institute. In 1965, she and her doubles partner Lin Huiqing won the gold medal at the 1965 World Table Tennis Championships in the women's doubles in Yugoslavia. She was also part of the Chinese women's team that won the Corbillon Cup (team event) gold medal.

Competition was banned for four years during the Cultural Revolution, and while training was banned, Zheng practised on her own in secret.

She and Lin returned to the 1971 World Table Tennis Championships in Japan, again winning the women's doubles and gaining a silver medal in the singles.

Following her successes at the World Table Tennis Championships, Zheng participated in ping-pong diplomacy, visiting the United States in 1972. One year later she won her sixth and final medal at the 1973 World Table Tennis Championships, a silver medal in the Corbillon Cup (team event).

== Personal life ==
She met her husband, a specialist in shogi, at a Shanghai sports school. They have a son.

== See also ==
- List of table tennis players
- List of World Table Tennis Championships medalists
