= Naoko Fukatsu =

Japanese table tennis player

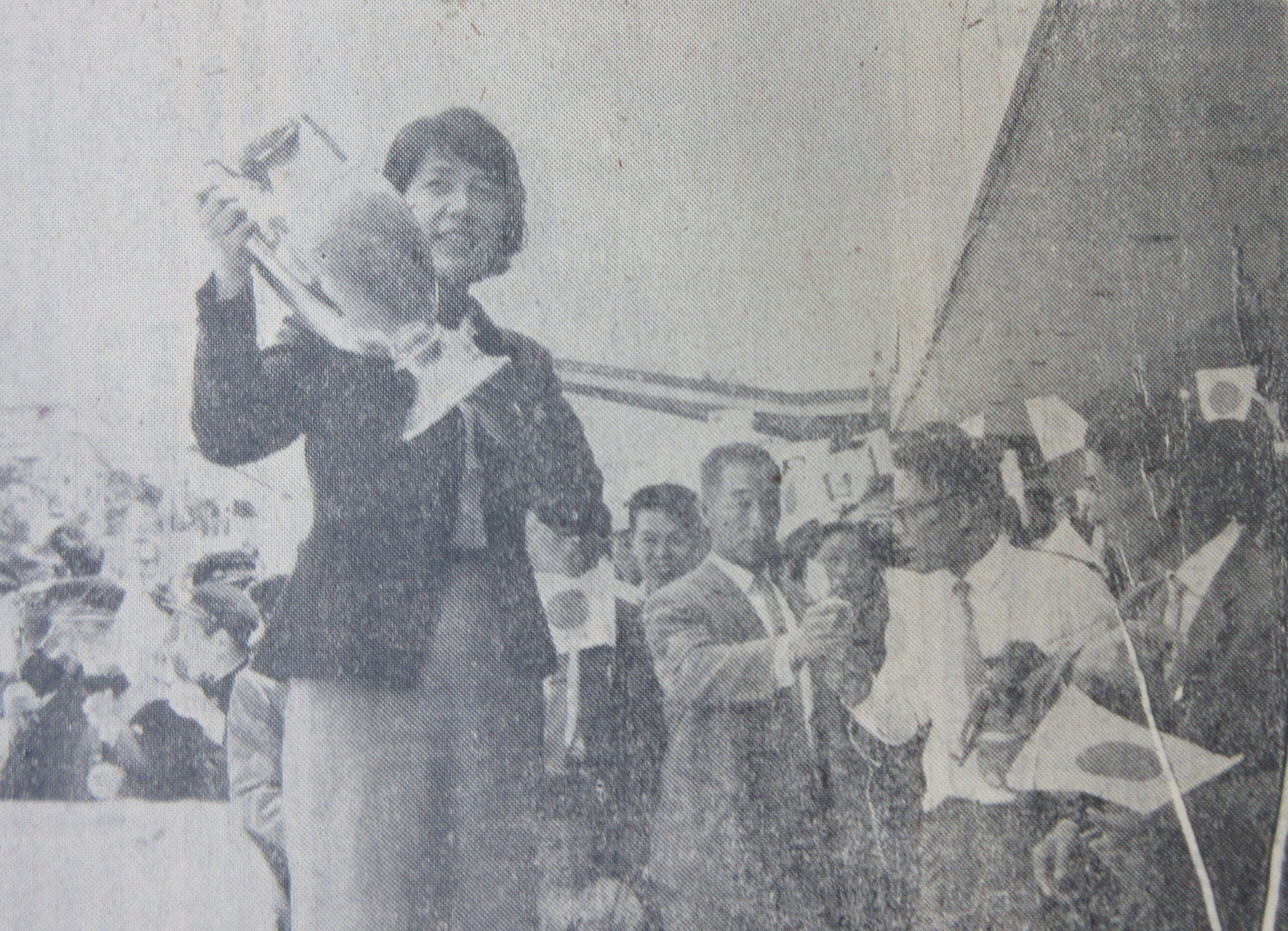

Personal information
- Full name: Naoko Fukatsu
- Nationality: Japan
- Born: 23 December 1944 (age 81) Okazaki, Aichi

Sport
- Sport: Table tennis
Medal record
Women's table tennis
Representing Japan
World Championships
Silver medal – second place	1967 Stockholm	Singles
Silver medal – second place	1967 Stockholm	Doubles
Silver medal – second place	1967 Stockholm	Mixed Doubles
Gold medal – first place	1967 Stockholm	Women's Team
Gold medal – first place	1965 Ljubljana	Singles
Bronze medal – third place	1965 Ljubljana	Mixed Doubles
Silver medal – second place	1965 Ljubljana	Women's Team
Asian Championships
Gold medal – first place	1964 Seoul	Doubles
Gold medal – first place	1964 Seoul	Mixed Doubles
Gold medal – first place	1964 Seoul	Women's Team

Naoko Fukatsu (深津 尚子, Fukatsu Naoko; born 23 December 1944 in Okazaki, Aichi) is a former international table tennis player from Japan.

== Table tennis career ==
From 1964 to 1967 she won several medals in singles, doubles, and team events in the World Table Tennis Championships and in the Asian Table Tennis Championships.

The seven World Championship medals included two gold medals in the singles at the 1965 World Table Tennis Championships and team event at the 1967 World Table Tennis Championships.

== See also ==
- List of table tennis players
- List of World Table Tennis Championships medalists
