= Noriko Yamanaka =

Japanese table tennis player

Personal information
- Full name: Yamanaka Noriko
- Nationality: Japan
- Born: 1941 (age 84–85)

Sport
- Sport: Table tennis
Medal record
Women's table tennis
Representing Japan
World Championships
Bronze medal – third place	1967 Stockholm	Singles
Silver medal – second place	1967 Stockholm	Doubles
Gold medal – first place	1967 Stockholm	Mixed
Gold medal – first place	1967 Stockholm	Team
Bronze medal – third place	1965 Ljubljana	Singles
Silver medal – second place	1965 Ljubljana	Doubles
Silver medal – second place	1965 Ljubljana	Team
Bronze medal – third place	1963 Prague	Doubles
Gold medal – first place	1963 Prague	Team

Noriko Yamanaka (山中 教子, Yamanaka Noriko) is a former international table tennis player from Japan.

== Table tennis career ==
From 1963 to 1967 she won nine medals in singles, doubles, and team events in the World Table Tennis Championships.

The nine World Championship medals included three gold medals; one in the mixed doubles at the 1967 World Table Tennis Championships with Nobuhiko Hasegawa and two in the team event for Japan.

== See also ==
- List of table tennis players
- List of World Table Tennis Championships medalists
