= Koji Kimura =

Japanese table tennis player

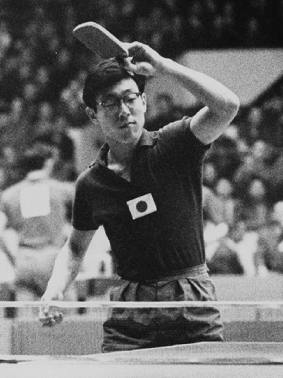

Personal information
- Full name: KIMURA Koji
- Nationality: Japan
- Born: 11 December 1940 (age 85)

Sport
- Sport: Table tennis
Medal record
Table tennis
Representing Japan
World Championships
Bronze medal – third place	1967 Stockholm	Singles
Silver medal – second place	1967 Stockholm	Mixed Doubles
Gold medal – first place	1967 Stockholm	Team
Gold medal – first place	1965 Ljubljana	Mixed doubles
Silver medal – second place	1965 Ljubljana	Team
Gold medal – first place	1963 Prague	Mixed doubles
Silver medal – second place	1963 Prague	Team
Gold medal – first place	1961 Beijing	Doubles
Silver medal – second place	1961 Beijing	Team
Asian Championships
Gold medal – first place	1964 Seoul	Singles
Gold medal – first place	1964 Seoul	Doubles
Silver medal – second place	1964 Seoul	Mixed doubles
Gold medal – first place	1964 Seoul	Team

Koji Kimura (木村 興治, Kimura Kōji; born 11 December 1940) is a retired Japanese table tennis player and coach who won four world titles between 1961 and 1967. He is left-handed.

== Table tennis career ==
He won nine World Championship medals included four gold medals; one in the doubles with Nobuya Hoshino; two in the mixed doubles with Kazuko Ito-Yamaizumi and Masako Seki respectively and one in the team event for Japan.

== Retirement ==
After retiring from competitions Kimura worked as a sports functionary. He is a senior member of the Japanese Olympic Committee and vice president of the Japanese Table Tennis Association. In 2014 he was elected to the Advisory Council of the International Table Tennis Federation.
