= Lin Huiqing =

Chinese table tennis player

Lin Huiqing (Lin Hui-ching)
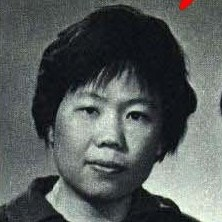

Personal information
- Nationality: China
- Born: 16 July 1941 (age 85) Batavia, Dutch East Indies

Sport
- Sport: Table tennis
Medal record
Women's table tennis
Representing China
World Championships
Gold medal – first place	1971 Nagoya	Singles
Gold medal – first place	1971 Nagoya	Doubles
Gold medal – first place	1971 Nagoya	Mixed Doubles
Silver medal – second place	1971 Nagoya	Team
Silver medal – second place	1965 Ljubljana	Singles
Gold medal – first place	1965 Ljubljana	Doubles
Silver medal – second place	1965 Ljubljana	Mixed Doubles
Gold medal – first place	1965 Ljubljana	Team

Lin Huiqing (Chinese: 林慧卿; born 16 July 1941) also known as Lin Hui-ching is a former female international table tennis player from China.

== Table tennis career ==
From 1965 to 1971 she won eight medals in singles, doubles, and team events in the World Table Tennis Championships.

The eight World Championship medals included five gold medals in the singles at the 1971 World Table Tennis Championships, the team event at the 1965 World Table Tennis Championships, the mixed doubles in 1971 with Zhang Xielin and two women's doubles title in 1965 and 1971 with Zheng Minzhi.

== See also ==
- List of table tennis players
- List of World Table Tennis Championships medalists
