= Ken Konaka =

Japanese table tennis player

Personal information
- Nationality: Japan

Sport
- Sport: Table tennis

Ken Konaka is a former international table tennis player from Japan.

== Table tennis career ==
In 1964 he won several medals in team events in the Asian Table Tennis Championships.

He won four World Championship medals; two silver medals in the team event, one bronze medal in the doubles with Keiichi Miki and another bronze in the mixed doubles with Naoko Fukatsu.

== See also ==
- List of table tennis players
- List of World Table Tennis Championships medalists
