= Xu Yinsheng =

Chinese table tennis player

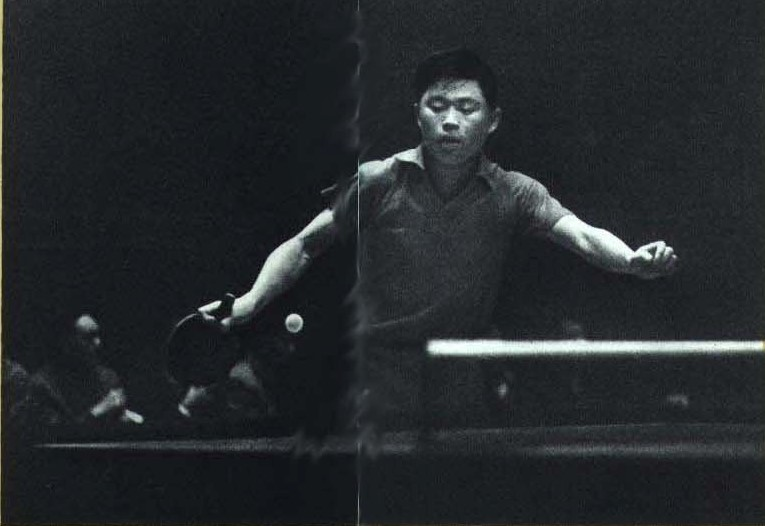
- Xu in 1965

Personal information
- Nationality: China
- Born: 12 May 1938 (age 88) Shanghai, Republic of China

Sport
- Sport: Table tennis
Medal record
Men's table tennis
Representing China
World Championships
Gold medal – first place	1965 Ljubljana	Doubles
Gold medal – first place	1965 Ljubljana	Team
Silver medal – second place	1963 Prague	Doubles
Gold medal – first place	1963 Prague	Team
Bronze medal – third place	1961 Beijing	Singles
Gold medal – first place	1961 Beijing	Team
Bronze medal – third place	1959 Dortmund	Team

Xu Yinsheng (Chinese: 徐寅生; Wade–Giles: Hsü Yin-sheng; born 12 May 1938) is a male former table tennis player from China. He was born in Shanghai.

== Table tennis career ==
From 1959 to 1965, he won seven medals in singles, doubles, and team events in the World Table Tennis Championships.

His seven World Championship medals included four gold medals; three in the team event and one in the doubles with Zhuang Zedong at the 1965 World Table Tennis Championships. He was the coach of the national team in Nagoya 1971 World Championship.Davis, Kenrick (June 10, 2021). "How Ping-Pong Turned the Tables of the Cold War". Sixth Tone. Archived from the original on 23 September 2023.

== Professional achievements ==
He was president of the International Table Tennis Federation from 1995, following the sudden death of Sven-Olof Hammarlund, till 1999, when he was succeeded by the Canadian Adham Sharara.

He has been inducted in the ITTF Hall of Fame in 2010.

== Other significance ==
On the eve of the Cultural Revolution, Xu's advice for playing ping pong was viewed as informative also in the context of commerce, and as endorsed by People's Daily, it was promoted as relevant inspiration for retail workers.

== See also ==
- List of table tennis players
- ITTF Hall of Fame
- List of table tennis players
- List of World Table Tennis Championships medalists
