= Zhang Xielin =

Chinese table tennis player

Zhang Xielin (Chang Shih-Lin)
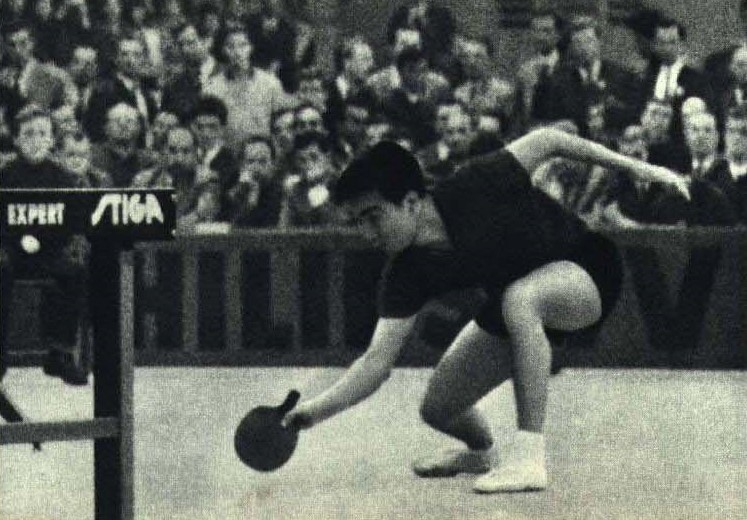
- Zhang Xielin in 1965.

Personal information
- Nationality: China
- Born: July 1940 (age 85)
Medal record
Representing China
World Table Tennis Championships
Bronze medal – third place	1961	singles
Bronze medal – third place	1963	singles
Gold medal – first place	1963	doubles
Gold medal – first place	1963	team
Gold medal – first place	1965	team
Silver medal – second place	1965	doubles
Silver medal – second place	1965	mixed doubles
Gold medal – first place	1971	mixed doubles

Zhang Xielin (born July 1940) is a Chinese table-tennis player who carried the Olympic flag in 2008 Summer Olympics Opening Ceremony.

== Table tennis career ==
He used a distinctive pen-grip chopping technique and was active in the 1960s. Utilizing steady chops and unpredictable spins, He is one of the earliest successful long-pimple rubber players, and the first Chinese player to win a men's doubles champion (with Wang Zhiliang, at the 1963 World Table Tennis Championships).

His eight World Championship medals included four gold medals; in addition to the men's doubles he won a mixed doubles with Lin Huiqing and two in the team event.

== See also ==
- List of table tennis players
- List of World Table Tennis Championships medalists
