= Li Furong =

Chinese male table tennis player (born 1942)

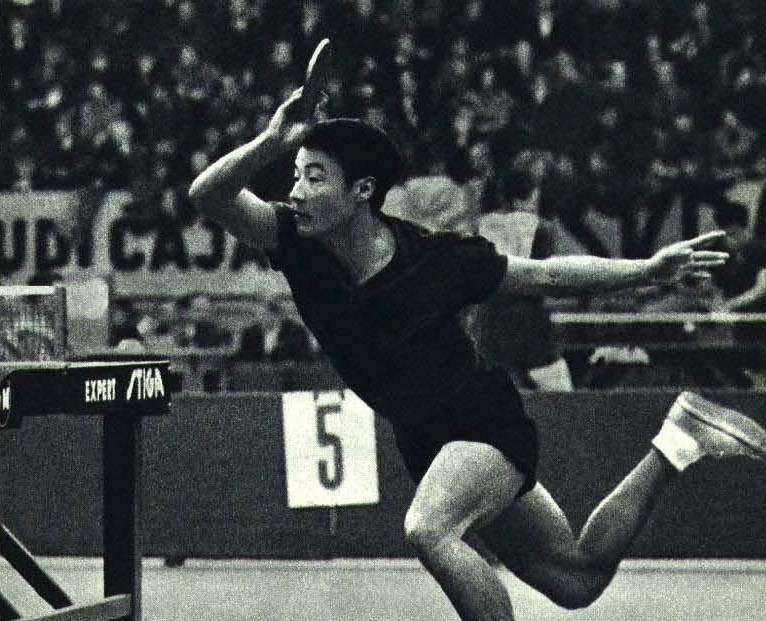
- 1965 28th World Championship Li Furong

Personal information
- Native name: 李富荣
- Full name: LI Furong/LI Fu-Jung
- Nationality: China
- Born: 1942 (age 83–84) Shanghai, China

Sport
- Sport: Table tennis
Medal record
Men's table tennis
Representing China
World Championships
Gold medal – first place	1971 Nagoya	Team
Silver medal – second place	1965 Ljubljana	Singles
Bronze medal – third place	1965 Ljubljana	Doubles
Gold medal – first place	1965 Ljubljana	Team
Silver medal – second place	1963 Prague	Singles
Bronze medal – third place	1963 Prague	Doubles
Gold medal – first place	1963 Prague	Team
Silver medal – second place	1961 Beijing	Singles
Bronze medal – third place	1961 Beijing	Doubles
Silver medal – second place	1961 Beijing	Mixed Doubles
Gold medal – first place	1961 Beijing	Team

Li Furong (simplified Chinese: 李富荣; traditional Chinese: 李富榮; pinyin: Lǐ Fùróng; Wade–Giles: Li Fu-jung; born 1942 in Shanghai, China) is a Chinese male table tennis player. He was a native of Zhejiang province starting to play table tennis at 15 and joined the national team in 1959. Li helped the Chinese men's team win four team titles at the World Table Tennis Championships in 1961, 1963, 1965 and 1971. In men's singles competitions, he made 3 consecutive appearances at the finals of the World Championships in 1961, 1963, and 1965. However, Li lost to compatriot Zhuang Zedong in all of the three finals, making himself become one of four players who played in three finals without winning (together with Hungarian Laszlo Bellak, Polish Alojzy Ehrlich and countryman Ma Lin). Rumor had it that Li's losses at the finals were prearranged. The 1961 Championships was referred as the commencement of match fixing in history of Chinese table tennis.

In 1999, Li was inducted into the ITTF Hall of Fame. Li became the president of Asian Table Tennis Union (ATTU) in 2001. The post was succeeded by Cai Zhenhua in 2009 and Li was awarded the ATTU Honorary Life President in 2010.
