= Zhuang Zedong =

Chinese table tennis player

Zhuang Zedong 庄则栋
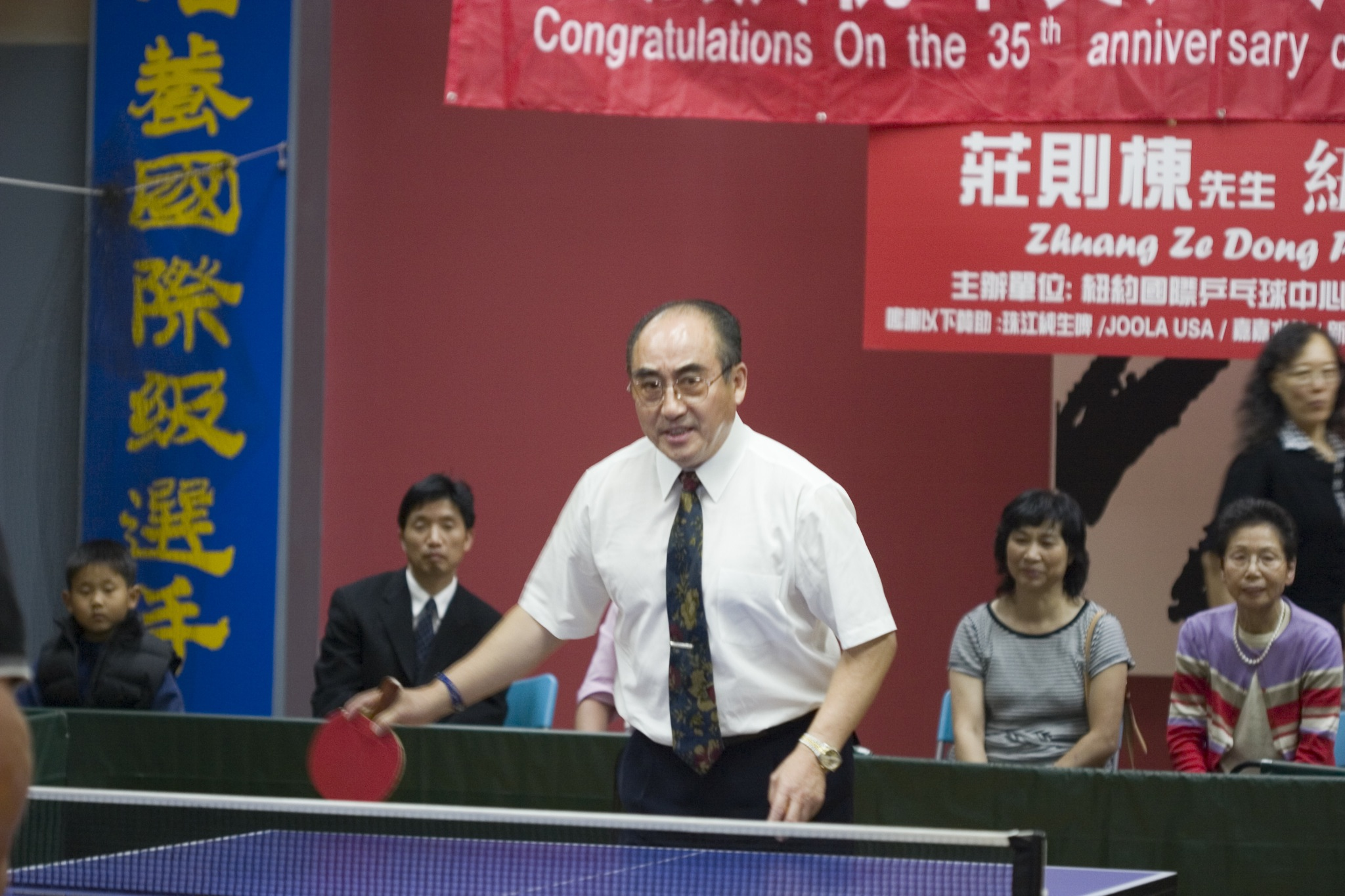
- Zhuang Zedong in 2007 (photo: Tom Nguyen)

Personal information
- Nationality: Chinese
- Born: 25 August 1940 Yangzhou, Jiangsu, China
- Died: 10 February 2013 (aged 72) Beijing, China

Sport
- Sport: Table tennis
Medal record
Men's table tennis
Representing China
World Championships
Gold medal – first place	1971 Nagoya	Team
Gold medal – first place	1965 Ljubljana	Singles
Gold medal – first place	1965 Ljubljana	Doubles
Gold medal – first place	1965 Ljubljana	Team
Gold medal – first place	1963 Prague	Singles
Gold medal – first place	1963 Prague	Team
Gold medal – first place	1961 Beijing	Singles
Gold medal – first place	1961 Beijing	Team
Silver medal – second place	1971 Nagoya	Doubles
Silver medal – second place	1963 Prague	Doubles
Bronze medal – third place	1965 Ljubljana	Mixed
Bronze medal – third place	1963 Prague	Mixed
Bronze medal – third place	1961 Beijing	Doubles

Zhuang Zedong
- Traditional Chinese: 莊則棟
- Simplified Chinese: 庄则栋
Transcriptions
Standard Mandarin
- Hanyu Pinyin: Zhuāng Zédòng
- Wade–Giles: Chuang^{1} Tse^{2}-tung^{4}

Zhuang Zedong (Chuang Tse-tung; August 25, 1940 – February 10, 2013) was a Chinese table tennis player, three-time world men's singles champion and champion at numerous other table tennis events. These accomplishments lead Zhuang as one of the greatest table tennis players of all time and a well-known political personality during the tumult of the Cultural Revolution. His chance meeting with American table tennis player, Glenn Cowan, during the 31st World Table Tennis Championship, later referred to as ping-pong diplomacy, triggered the first thawing of the ice in Sino-American relations since 1949. Zhuang was once married to the pianist Bao Huiqiao, and his second wife was the Chinese-born Japanese Atsuko Sasaki.

== Table tennis career ==
Zhuang was born in August 1940 and he joined the Chinese National Table Tennis team as a teenager. His coach was Fu Qifang. In 1961, at the 26th World Table Tennis Championship, he won his first men's singles championship, and at the next two World Table Tennis Championships, the 27th and 28th in 1963 and 1965 respectively, he again won the men's singles championship.

On January 20, 1968, two years into the Cultural Revolution, he married Bao Huiqiao in her dormitory room at the National Music Conservatory in Beijing. During the Cultural Revolution which began in 1966, Zhuang was not able to pursue his career as a table tennis player as usual, nor was Bao for hers as a pianist.

== Unique style among penholders ==
Influenced by a veteran national team member and national champion Wang Chuanyao, and encouraged by his coach, Zhuang picked up the "Dual-sided Offense" style in the 1950s when he was a teenager.

During the 50s to 60s, the majority of the pen-holding style players lacked attacking or counter-attack capabilities on the backhand side, and relied solely on push-blocking. Wang is believed to be among the pioneers of the "Penholding Dual-sided Offense" style that emphasize on offensive backhand strokes and drives.

Zhuang adopted but modified Wang's style by:

1. Shortening the strokes of backhand drives – sometimes even by simply using wrist or finger actions to flick the racket (referred to by himself in his book as to "knock" or "snap" the ball).
2. Standing closer to the table than Wang – but still two to three feet away from the table, which is farther away than most push-blocking penholders who are normally within two feet.

He did so as a result of his meticulous analysis of the physical differences between him and Wang – Wang was much taller and had a longer arm-coverage which enabled bigger, more powerful swings and strokes.

Zhuang had to streamline his strokes and instead attempted to generate a sudden burst of explosive power via a smaller motion, similar to the "one-inch punch" in the Wing Chun Kung Fu style.

He won and dominated three World Championships with this unique style, and encountered almost no competition from the Japanese, European and his fellow Chinese players. Table tennis observers generally believe that he could have won one to two more world championships if the Cultural Revolution had not occurred. This is evidenced by the fact the next two champions both had lopsided losing records against Zhuang during the time when the Chinese team did not participate during the Cultural Revolution.

== Political career ==
=== Ping-pong diplomacy ===
In late 1969, the training of the National Table Tennis Team resumed as a result of the intervention of Premier Zhou Enlai, and in 1971, Zhuang Zedong and the Chinese team attended the 31st World Table Tennis Championship. One day during the championship in Nagoya, Japan, American team member Glenn Cowan missed his own bus and in his haste got onto the bus of the Chinese team. Unlike his team mates, who ignored Cowan due to the political disagreements between their countries, Zhuang Zedong greeted him and presented him with a silk-screen portrait of the Huangshan Mountains, thus starting the so-called ping-pong diplomacy. The ping-pong diplomacy was a great example of man-man during this time to prove that groups from opposing countries could come together and be civil. Ten months after Zhuang's chance meeting with Cowan, Richard Nixon, then president of the United States, visited China in February, 1972 to show faith in the Chinese government. Only two months later, Zhuang led the Chinese table tennis delegation to the United States from April 18 to 30, as part of an 18-day trip including Canada, Mexico and Peru. American media during Zhuang's trip highlighted friendly encounters between the Chinese players and Americans.

This brought the two countries together and started to help China's revolution by creating allies.The ping-pong diplomacy eventually led to the normalization of Sino-American relationships in 1979.

=== Cultural Revolution and consequences ===
In 1973, Zhuang Zedong became a favorite of Jiang Qing, wife of Mao Zedong. Following Mao Zedong's death in 1976, Zhuang was investigated because of his links to the Gang of Four, which Jiang Qing was a member of. After the downfall in October, 1976 of the Gang of Four, Zhuang Zedong was jailed and investigated. In 1980, the investigation ended and he was sent to Taiyuan, Shanxi to work as a coach of the provincial table tennis team.

== Personal life ==
=== New life in Beijing ===
In 1985, Zhuang was allowed to return to Beijing again, and it was arranged that he would coach the young table tennis players at the Palace of Youth in Beijing. Zhuang's relationship with Bao Huiqiao had been reportedly deteriorating during the tumultuous years of the Cultural Revolution and was not to be repaired. On February 2, 1985, he and Bao Huiqiao were officially divorced. They had one daughter and one son before their divorce.

About this time, Zhuang Zedong published his book Chuang Yu Chuang (闯与创, "Adventure and Creation").

=== Marriage to Atsuko Sasaki ===
Later in 1985, the Chinese-born Japanese Atsuko Sasaki (佐々木敦子) (Chinese: 佐佐木敦子; pinyin: Zuǒzuǒmù Dūnzǐ) met Zhuang in Beijing. Sasaki was born in 1944 in Zhangye, Gansu, China (a settlement at no point occupied by Japanese forces) to Japanese parents. Her family did not move back to Japan until 1976. By this time, Sasaki had finished her high-school education in China and her father had died of cancer in Lanzhou. Sasaki Atsuko had met Zhuang Zedong previously in Japan in 1971 and 1972 and was a fan of Zhuang.

When Zhuang and Sasaki decided to get married, both had to go through a difficult political process due to the political environment in China. Zhuang had to write to Li Ruihuan and Deng Xiaoping about the matter, and Sasaki had to give up her Japanese citizenship and apply for Chinese citizenship. Eventually, Zhuang and Sasaki got married in 1987.

Zhuang and Sasaki lived together for 26 years. Zhuang wrote a book about their story, entitled Deng Xiaoping approved our marriage. Zhuang opened an international table tennis club in Beijing. He visited the United States in 2007, speaking at USC and other universities about his role in fostering better relations between China and the United States.

== Cancer and death ==
In 2008, Zhuang Zedong was diagnosed with late-stage colon cancer. Although he sought treatment in various hospitals around China, the tumour metastasized to his liver and lungs. Five months before his death, he only had one eighth of his liver left. He requested euthanasia, but this request was denied by his doctors. On 10 February 2013, the first day of the Chinese New Year, Zhuang died at You'an Hospital in Beijing, at the age of 72. Within a day there were 300,000 messages about his death on Chinese microblogging sites.
