= 1959 World Table Tennis Championships – Mixed doubles =

1959 Mixed doubles

The 1959 World Table Tennis Championships mixed doubles was the 25th edition of the mixed doubles championship.

Ichiro Ogimura and Fujie Eguchi defeated Teruo Murakami and Kimiyo Matsuzaki in the final by three sets to nil.

== Results ==
Round of 16
(Hungary) Zoltán Berczik (Hungary) Gizi Lantos-Farkas	3
(Poland) Janusz Kusiński (Poland) Danuta Szmidt	0
(Japan) Nobuya Hoshino (Japan) Taeko Namba	21	21	21
(England) Jeff Ingber (England) Elsie Carrington	12	16	19
(Czechoslovakia) Josef Posejpal (Czechoslovakia) Emilie Rabasová	20	21	15	21	21
(South Korea) Gautam Divan (South Korea) Lee Chong-Hi	22	17	21	18	11
(Japan) Teruo Murakami (Japan) Kimiyo Matsuzaki	3
(Hungary) Ferenc Sidó (Hungary) Lívia Mossóczy	0
(China) Wang Chuan-yao (China) Sun Mei-ying	3
(Hungary) László Földy (Hungary) Éva Kóczián	1
(Socialist Federal Republic of Yugoslavia) Željko Hrbud (England) Ann Haydon	20	21	15	21	21
(Japan) Seiji Narita (Japan) Kazuko Ito-Yamaizumi	22	17	21	18	11
(South Korea) Sung In Park (South Korea) Choi Kyong-ja	3
(Austria) Karl Wegrath (Austria) Hildegard Hintner	1
(Japan) Ichiro Ogimura (Japan) Fujie Eguchi	21	21	20	21
(China) Chiang Yung-Ning (China) Yeh Pei-chun	18	11	22	14

Quarterfinals
(Hungary) Berczik (Hungary) Lantos	18	21	21	21
(Japan) Hoshino (Japan) Namba	21	15	11	19
(Czechoslovakia) Posejpal (Czechoslovakia) Rabasová	14	14	11
(Japan) Murakami (Japan) Matsuzaki	21	21	21
(China) Wang Chuan-yao (China) Sun Mei-ying	20	21	25	21	23
(Socialist Federal Republic of Yugoslavia) Hrbud (England) Haydon	22	17	27	14	21
(South Korea) Sung in Park (South Korea) Choi Kyong-ja	17	21	22	21
(Japan) Ogimura (Japan) Eguchi	21	11	20	19

Semifinals
(Hungary) Berczik (Hungary) Lantos	19	13	15
(Japan) Murakami (Japan) Matsuzaki	21	21	21
(China) Wang Chuan-yao (China) Sun Mei-ying	18	18	21	17
(Japan) Ogimura (Japan) Eguchi	21	21	18	21

Final
(Japan) Murakami (Japan) Matsuzaki	14	17	14
(Japan) Ogimura (Japan) Eguchi	21	21	21

== See also ==
- List of World Table Tennis Championships medalists
