= 1959 World Table Tennis Championships =

1959 edition of the World Table Tennis Championships

The 1959 World Table Tennis Championships were held in Dortmund from March 27 to April 5, 1959.

== Medalists ==
=== Team ===
Event	Gold	Silver	Bronze
Swaythling Cup; Men's Team	Japan; Nobuya Hoshino; Teruo Murakami; Seiji Narita; Ichiro Ogimura	Hungary; Zoltán Berczik; Zoltán Bubonyi; László Földy; László Pigniczki; Ferenc Sidó	China; Chiang Yung-Ning; Rong Guotuan; Wang Chuanyao; Xu Yinsheng; Yang Jai-Hua
Swaythling Cup; Men's Team	Japan; Nobuya Hoshino; Teruo Murakami; Seiji Narita; Ichiro Ogimura	Hungary; Zoltán Berczik; Zoltán Bubonyi; László Földy; László Pigniczki; Ferenc Sidó	South Vietnam; Lê Văn Tiết; Mai Văn Hòa; Trần Cảnh Được; Trần Văn Liễu
Corbillon Cup; Women's Team	Japan; Fujie Eguchi; Kimiyo Matsuzaki; Taeko Namba; Kazuko Yamaizumi	South Korea; Cho Kyung-Cha; Choi Kyung-ja; Hwang Yool-ja; Lee Chong-Hi	China; Qiu Zhonghui; Sun Meiying; Ye Peiqiong

=== Individual ===
Event	Gold	Silver	Bronze
Men's Singles	(China) Rong Guotuan	(Hungary) Ferenc Sidó	(United States) Richard Miles
Men's Singles	(China) Rong Guotuan	(Hungary) Ferenc Sidó	(Japan) Ichiro Ogimura
Women's Singles	(Japan) Kimiyo Matsuzaki	(Japan) Fujie Eguchi	(China) Qiu Zhonghui
Women's Singles	(Japan) Kimiyo Matsuzaki	(Japan) Fujie Eguchi	(Hungary) Éva Kóczián
Men's doubles	(Japan) Teruo Murakami (Japan) Ichiro Ogimura	(Czechoslovakia) Ladislav Štípek (Czechoslovakia) Ludvik Vyhnanovsky	(Hungary) Zoltán Berczik (Hungary) László Földy
Men's doubles	(Japan) Teruo Murakami (Japan) Ichiro Ogimura	(Czechoslovakia) Ladislav Štípek (Czechoslovakia) Ludvik Vyhnanovsky	(Sweden) Hans Alsér (Sweden) Ake Rakell
Women's doubles	(Japan) Taeko Namba (Japan) Kazuko Yamaizumi	(Japan) Fujie Eguchi (Japan) Kimiyo Matsuzaki	(England) Ann Haydon (England) Diane Rowe
Women's doubles	(Japan) Taeko Namba (Japan) Kazuko Yamaizumi	(Japan) Fujie Eguchi (Japan) Kimiyo Matsuzaki	(China) Qiu Zhonghui (China) Sun Meiying
Mixed doubles	(Japan) Ichiro Ogimura (Japan) Fujie Eguchi	(Japan) Teruo Murakami (Japan) Kimiyo Matsuzaki	(China) Wang Chuanyao (China) Sun Meiying
Mixed doubles	(Japan) Ichiro Ogimura (Japan) Fujie Eguchi	(Japan) Teruo Murakami (Japan) Kimiyo Matsuzaki	(Hungary) Zoltán Berczik (Hungary) Gizi Lantos-Farkas
