= Table tennis at the 1958 Asian Games – Women's singles =

Women's singles at the 1958 Asian Games
- Venue: Waseda University Gymnasium
- Date: 29–31 May 1958
- Competitors: 18 from 5 nations

Medalists
gold medal	Taeko Namba	Japan
silver medal	Kazuko Yamaizumi	Japan
bronze medal	Cho Kyung-ja	South Korea
bronze medal	Fujie Eguchi	Japan

The women's singles table tennis event was part of the table tennis programme and took place between 29 and 31 May, at the Waseda University Gymnasium.

== Schedule ==
All times are Japan Standard Time (UTC+09:00)

Date	Time	Event
Thursday, 29 May 1958	13:00	1st round
Thursday, 29 May 1958	13:00	2nd round
Friday, 30 May 1958	15:00	Quarterfinals
Friday, 30 May 1958	15:00	Semifinals
Saturday, 31 May 1958	18:30	Final

== Results ==
=== Final ===
Final
Taeko Namba (JPN)	3
Kazuko Yamaizumi (JPN)	0

=== Top half ===
1st round
Azam Khatib (IRN)	0
Chiang Tsai-yun (ROC)	3

2nd round
Choi Kyung-ja (KOR)	3
Chiang Tsai-yun (ROC)	1
Taeko Namba (JPN)	3
Baguio Wong (HKG)	1
Yao Tsu (ROC)	0
Lau Wai Lim (HKG)	3
Cho Kyung-ja (KOR)	3
Tomi Okawa (JPN)	0

Quarterfinals
Choi Kyung-ja (KOR)	1
Taeko Namba (JPN)	3
Lau Wai Lim (HKG)	2
Cho Kyung-ja (KOR)	3

Semifinals
Taeko Namba (JPN)	3
Cho Kyung-ja (KOR)	0

=== Bottom half ===
1st round
Park Chung-ja (KOR)	1
Atieh Derakhshan (IRN)	3

2nd round
Fujie Eguchi (JPN)	3
Atieh Derakhshan (IRN)	0
Ching Yui (ROC)	3
Fan Sin Kwan (HKG)	2
Chen Pao-pei (ROC)	2
Kazuko Yamaizumi (JPN)	3
Ng Yuk Chun (HKG)	0
Wie Sang-sook (KOR)	3

Quarterfinals
Fujie Eguchi (JPN)	3
Ching Yui (ROC)	1
Kazuko Yamaizumi (JPN)	3
Wie Sang-sook (KOR)	0

Semifinals
Fujie Eguchi (JPN)	0
Kazuko Yamaizumi (JPN)	3
