= Table tennis at the 1958 Asian Games – Women's team =

Women's team at the 1958 Asian Games
- Venue: Waseda University Gymnasium
- Dates: 25–27 May 1958
- Competitors: 18 from 5 nations

Medalists
gold medal	Japan; Fujie Eguchi, Taeko Namba, Tomi Okawa, Kazuko Yamaizumi
silver medal	South Korea; Cho Kyung-ja, Choi Kyung-ja, Park Chung-ja, Wie Sang-sook
bronze medal	Republic of China; Chen Pao-pei, Chiang Tsai-yun, Ching Yui, Yao Tsu

The women's team table tennis event was part of the table tennis programme and took place between 25 and 27 May, at the Waseda University Gymnasium.

== Schedule ==
All times are Japan Standard Time (UTC+09:00)

Date	Time	Event
Sunday, 25 May 1958	10:00	Round robin
Monday, 26 May 1958	10:00	Round robin
Tuesday, 27 May 1958	10:00	Round robin

== Results ==
Pos	Team	Pld	W	L	MF	MA
1	Japan	4	4	0	12	0
2	South Korea	4	3	1	9	7
3	Republic of China	4	2	2	8	8
4	Hong Kong	4	1	3	7	9
5	Iran	4	0	4	0	12

Source: Official report

25 May	Republic of China	3–0	Iran

Chen Pao-pei	2–0	Atieh Derakhshan
Chiang Tsai-yun	2–0	Azam Khatib
Chen Pao-pei / Chiang Tsai-yun	2–0	Atieh Derakhshan / Azam Khatib

25 May	South Korea	3–2	Hong Kong

Wie Sang-sook	1–2	Baguio Wong
Choi Kyung-ja	2–0	Fan Sin Kwan
Wie Sang-sook / Choi Kyung-ja	1–2	Baguio Wong / Ng Yuk Chun
Wie Sang-sook	2–1	Fan Sin Kwan
Choi Kyung-ja	2–0	Baguio Wong

25 May	Japan	3–0	Iran

Tomi Okawa	2–0	Atieh Derakhshan
Fujie Eguchi	2–0	Azam Khatib
Tomi Okawa / Taeko Namba	2–0	Atieh Derakhshan / Azam Khatib

26 May	Republic of China	3–2	Hong Kong

Chen Pao-pei	0–2	Ng Yuk Chun
Chiang Tsai-yun	1–2	Baguio Wong
Chen Pao-pei / Chiang Tsai-yun	2–1	Baguio Wong / Ng Yuk Chun
Chen Pao-pei	2–0	Baguio Wong
Chiang Tsai-yun	2–0	Ng Yuk Chun

26 May	Iran	0–3	South Korea

Atieh Derakhshan	0–2	Cho Kyung-ja
Azam Khatib	0–2	Choi Kyung-ja
Atieh Derakhshan / Azam Khatib	0–2	Wie Sang-sook / Choi Kyung-ja

26 May	Republic of China	2–3	South Korea

Chiang Tsai-yun	2–0	Cho Kyung-ja
Chen Pao-pei	0–2	Choi Kyung-ja
Chen Pao-pei / Chiang Tsai-yun	2–0	Wie Sang-sook / Choi Kyung-ja
Chiang Tsai-yun	1–2	Choi Kyung-ja
Chen Pao-pei	1–2	Cho Kyung-ja

26 May	Hong Kong	0–3	Japan

Fan Sin Kwan	0–2	Fujie Eguchi
Lau Wai Lim	0–2	Kazuko Yamaizumi
Baguio Wong / Ng Yuk Chun	0–2	Fujie Eguchi / Kazuko Yamaizumi

27 May	South Korea	0–3	Japan

Wie Sang-sook	0–2	Tomi Okawa
Choi Kyung-ja	0–2	Fujie Eguchi
Wie Sang-sook / Choi Kyung-ja	0–2	Tomi Okawa / Taeko Namba

27 May	Iran	0–3	Hong Kong

Atieh Derakhshan	1–2	Ng Yuk Chun
Azam Khatib	0–2	Baguio Wong
Atieh Derakhshan / Azam Khatib	0–2	Ng Yuk Chun / Baguio Wong

27 May	Republic of China	0–3	Japan

Chen Pao-pei	0–2	Fujie Eguchi
Chiang Tsai-yun	1–2	Tomi Okawa
Chen Pao-pei / Chiang Tsai-yun	0–2	Tomi Okawa / Taeko Namba

== Non-participating athletes ==
- Park Chung-ja (KOR)
- Ching Yui (ROC)
- Yao Tsu (ROC)
