= Table tennis at the 1958 Asian Games – Women's doubles =

Women's doubles at the 1958 Asian Games
- Venue: Waseda University Gymnasium
- Date: 28–31 May 1958
- Competitors: 18 from 5 nations

Medalists
gold medal	Fujie Eguchi; Kazuko Yamaizumi	Japan
silver medal	Baguio Wong; Ng Yuk Chun	Hong Kong
bronze medal	Wie Sang-sook; Choi Kyung-ja	South Korea
bronze medal	Chen Pao-pei; Chiang Tsai-yun	Republic of China

The women's doubles table tennis event was part of the table tennis programme and took place between 28 and 31 May, at the Waseda University Gymnasium. 9 teams from 5 nations entered for the tournament, teams from the same NOC would not face each other before the final.

The Japanese duo of Fujie Eguchi and Kazuko Yamaizumi won the gold medal after beating Baguio Wong and Ng Yuk Chun from Hong Kong 21–13, 21–12, 21–3 in the final.

== Schedule ==
All times are Japan Standard Time (UTC+09:00)

Date	Time	Event
Wednesday, 28 May 1958	13:00	1st round
Wednesday, 28 May 1958	13:00	Quarterfinals
Wednesday, 28 May 1958	13:00	Semifinals
Saturday, 31 May 1958	15:30	Final

== Results ==
1st round
Park Chung-ja (KOR); Cho Kyung-ja (KOR)	3
Azam Khatib (IRN); Atieh Derakhshan (IRN)	0

Quarterfinals
Fujie Eguchi (JPN); Kazuko Yamaizumi (JPN)	3
Yao Tsu (ROC); Ching Yui (ROC)	0
Fan Sin Kwan (HKG); Lau Wai Lim (HKG)	0
Wie Sang-sook (KOR); Choi Kyung-ja (KOR)	3
Chen Pao-pei (ROC); Chiang Tsai-yun (ROC)	3
Park Chung-ja (KOR); Cho Kyung-ja (KOR)	0
Baguio Wong (HKG); Ng Yuk Chun (HKG)	3
Tomi Okawa (JPN); Taeko Namba (JPN)	1

Semifinals
Fujie Eguchi (JPN); Kazuko Yamaizumi (JPN)	3
Wie Sang-sook (KOR); Choi Kyung-ja (KOR)	0
Chen Pao-pei (ROC); Chiang Tsai-yun (ROC)	2
Baguio Wong (HKG); Ng Yuk Chun (HKG)	3

Final
Fujie Eguchi (JPN); Kazuko Yamaizumi (JPN)	3
Baguio Wong (HKG); Ng Yuk Chun (HKG)	0
