= Table tennis at the 1958 Asian Games – Mixed doubles =

Mixed doubles at the 1958 Asian Games
- Venue: Waseda University Gymnasium
- Date: 28–31 May 1958
- Competitors: 36 from 5 nations

Medalists
| gold medal | Ichiro Ogimura; Fujie Eguchi | Japan |
| silver medal | Toshiaki Tanaka; Kazuko Yamaizumi | Japan |
| bronze medal | Seiji Narita; Tomi Okawa | Japan |
| bronze medal | Keisuke Tsunoda; Taeko Namba | Japan |

The mixed doubles table tennis event was part of the table tennis programme and took place between 28 and 31 May, at the Waseda University Gymnasium.

== Schedule ==
All times are Japan Standard Time (UTC+09:00)

| Date | Time | Event |
|---|---|---|
| Wednesday, 28 May 1958 | 13:00 | 1st round |
| Wednesday, 28 May 1958 | 13:00 | 2nd round |
| Wednesday, 28 May 1958 | 13:00 | Quarterfinals |
| Wednesday, 28 May 1958 | 13:00 | Semifinals |
| Saturday, 31 May 1958 | 14:00 | Final |

== Results ==
=== Final ===
| Final |
| Ichiro Ogimura (JPN); Fujie Eguchi (JPN) | 3 |
| Toshiaki Tanaka (JPN); Kazuko Yamaizumi (JPN) | 2 |

=== Top half ===
1st round
Hsieh Chin-ho (ROC); Chiang Tsai-yun (ROC) | 3
Houshang Bozorgzadeh (IRN); Azam Khatib (IRN) | 1

2nd round
Ichiro Ogimura (JPN); Fujie Eguchi (JPN) | 3
Hsieh Chin-ho (ROC); Chiang Tsai-yun (ROC) | 0
Lee Dal-joon (KOR); Choi Kyung-ja (KOR) | 3
Tang Hung Bor (HKG); Fan Sin Kwan (HKG) | 2
Li Kou-tin (ROC); Chen Pao-pei (ROC) | 3
Lau Suk Fong (HKG); Lau Wai Lim (HKG) | 0
Seiji Narita (JPN); Tomi Okawa (JPN) | 3
Choo Chang-bok (KOR); Wie Sang-sook (KOR) | 0

Quarterfinals
Ichiro Ogimura (JPN); Fujie Eguchi (JPN) | 3
Lee Dal-joon (KOR); Choi Kyung-ja (KOR) | 0
Li Kou-tin (ROC); Chen Pao-pei (ROC) | 2
Seiji Narita (JPN); Tomi Okawa (JPN) | 3

Semifinals
Ichiro Ogimura (JPN); Fujie Eguchi (JPN) | 3
Seiji Narita (JPN); Tomi Okawa (JPN) | 2

=== Bottom half ===
1st round
Edmond Beitkhoda (IRN); Atieh Derakhshan (IRN) | 3
Kim Kyung-jun (KOR); Park Chung-ja (KOR) | 1

2nd round
Sih Su Chu (HKG); Baguio Wong (HKG) | 3
Sou Ying-chen (ROC); Yao Tsu (ROC) | 2
Park Sung-in (KOR); Cho Kyung-ja (KOR) | 1
Toshiaki Tanaka (JPN); Kazuko Yamaizumi (JPN) | 3
Chen Kao-shan (ROC); Ching Yui (ROC) | 0
Li Ping (HKG); Ng Yuk Chun (HKG) | 3
Edmond Beitkhoda (IRN); Atieh Derakhshan (IRN) | 0
Keisuke Tsunoda (JPN); Taeko Namba (JPN) | 3

Quarterfinals
Sih Su Chu (HKG); Baguio Wong (HKG) | 0
Toshiaki Tanaka (JPN); Kazuko Yamaizumi (JPN) | 3
Li Ping (HKG); Ng Yuk Chun (HKG) | 0
Keisuke Tsunoda (JPN); Taeko Namba (JPN) | 3

Semifinals
Toshiaki Tanaka (JPN); Kazuko Yamaizumi (JPN) | 3
Keisuke Tsunoda (JPN); Taeko Namba (JPN) | 2
