= 1959 World Table Tennis Championships – Women's team =

1959 Corbillon Cup (women's team)

The 1959 World Table Tennis Championships – Corbillon Cup (women's team) was the 18th edition of the women's team championship.

Japan won the gold medal, South Korea won the silver medal and China won the bronze medal.

== Medalists ==
Event	Gold	Silver	Bronze
	Japan; Fujie Eguchi; Kimiyo Matsuzaki; Taeko Namba; Kazuko Yamaizumi	South Korea; Cho Kyung-Cha; Choi Kyung-ja; Hwang Yool-ja; Lee Chong-Hi	China; Chiu Chung-Hui; Sun Mei-ying; Yei Pei-chun

== Final tables ==
=== Group 1 ===
Pos	Team	P	W	L	Pts
1	China	8	8	0	8
2	England	8	7	1	7
3	Sweden	8	5	3	5
4	East Germany	8	4	4	4
4	Netherlands	8	4	4	4
6	Denmark	8	2	6	2
6	Switzerland	8	2	6	2
6	Spain	8	2	6	2
8	United States	8	1	7	1

=== Group 2 ===
Pos	Team	P	W	L	Pts
1	South Korea	7	7	0	7
2	Czechoslovakia	7	6	1	6
3	Romania	7	5	2	5
4	Poland	7	4	3	4
5	(Republic of Ireland) Ireland	7	3	4	3
6	Wales	7	2	5	2
7	Greece	7	1	6	1
8	Norway	7	0	7	0

=== Group 3 ===
Pos	Team	P	W	L	Pts
1	Japan	8	8	0	8
2	Hungary	8	7	1	7
3	France	8	6	2	6
4	West Germany	8	5	3	5
5	Belgium	8	4	4	4
6	New Zealand	8	3	5	3
7	Austria	8	2	6	2
8	Italy	8	1	7	1
8	Canada	8	0	8	0

=== Final group ===
Pos	Team	P	W	L	Pts
1	Japan	2	2	0	2
2	South Korea	2	1	1	1
3	China	2	0	2	0

== Final Group Matches ==
Japan 3		China 0	Score
Namba	bt	Yei Pei-chun	21–9 21–18
Matsuzaki	bt	Sun Mei-ying	21–13 21–13
Matsuzaki & Eguchi	bt	Sun Mei-ying & Chiu Chung-Hui	21–11 21–8

South Korea 3		China 0	Score
Choe Kyong Ja	bt	Yei Pei Chun	13–21 21–18 22–20
Cho Kyung-Cha	bt	Chiu Chung-Hui	21–13 21–14
Cho Kyung-Cha & Choe Kyong Ja	bt	Sun Mei-ying & Chiu Chung-Hui	21–23 21–10 21–16

Japan 3		South Korea 2	Score
Namba	lost to	Cho Kyung-Cha	18–21 16–21
Namba	bt	Choe Kyong Ja	19–21 21–16 21–15
Matsuzaki	bt	Choe Kyong Ja	21–9 21–11
Matsuzaki	lost to	Cho Kyung-Cha	21–18 19–21 16–21
Matsuzaki & Eguchi	bt	Cho Kyung-Cha & Choe Kyong Ja	21–10 21–17

== See also ==
List of World Table Tennis Championships medalists
