= 1961 World Table Tennis Championships =

1961 edition of the World Table Tennis Championships

The 1961 World Table Tennis Championships were held in Beijing from April 5 to April 14, 1961.

== Medalists ==
=== Team ===
Event	Gold	Silver	Bronze
Swaythling Cup; Men's Team	China; Li Furong; Rong Guotuan; Wang Chuanyao; Xu Yinsheng; Zhuang Zedong	Japan; Nobuya Hoshino; Koji Kimura; Teruo Murakami; Ichiro Ogimura; Goro Shibutani	Hungary; Zoltán Berczik; László Földy; Miklós Péterfy; Péter Rózsás; Ferenc Sidó
Corbillon Cup; Women's Team	Japan; Kazuko Ito; Kimiyo Matsuzaki; Tomi Okawa; Masako Seki	China; Han Yuzhen; Hu Keming; Sun Meiying; Qiu Zhonghui	Romania; Maria Alexandru; Maria Catrinel Folea; Georgita Pitica

=== Individual ===
Event	Gold	Silver	Bronze
Men's singles	(China) Zhuang Zedong	(China) Li Furong	(China) Xu Yinsheng
Men's singles	(China) Zhuang Zedong	(China) Li Furong	(China) Zhang Xielin
Women's singles	(China) Qiu Zhonghui	(Hungary) Éva Kóczián	(China) Wang Jian
Women's singles	(China) Qiu Zhonghui	(Hungary) Éva Kóczián	(Japan) Kimiyo Matsuzaki
Men's doubles	(Japan) Nobuya Hoshino (Japan) Koji Kimura	(Hungary) Zoltán Berczik (Hungary) Ferenc Sidó	(China) Li Furong (China) Zhuang Zedong
Men's doubles	(Japan) Nobuya Hoshino (Japan) Koji Kimura	(Hungary) Zoltán Berczik (Hungary) Ferenc Sidó	(China) Zhou Lansun (China) Wang Jiasheng
Women's doubles	(Romania) Maria Alexandru (Romania) Georgita Pitica	(China) Qiu Zhonghui (China) Sun Meiying	(China) Hu Keming (China) Wang Jian
Women's doubles	(Romania) Maria Alexandru (Romania) Georgita Pitica	(China) Qiu Zhonghui (China) Sun Meiying	(China) Han Yuzhen (China) Liang Lizhen
Mixed doubles	(Japan) Ichiro Ogimura (Japan) Kimiyo Matsuzaki	(China) Li Furong (China) Han Yuzhen	(China) Wang Chuanyao (China) Sun Meiying
Mixed doubles	(Japan) Ichiro Ogimura (Japan) Kimiyo Matsuzaki	(China) Li Furong (China) Han Yuzhen	(Japan) Nobuya Hoshino (Japan) Masako Seki
