= 1961 World Table Tennis Championships – Mixed doubles =

1961 Mixed doubles

The 1961 World Table Tennis Championships mixed doubles was the 26th edition of the mixed doubles championship.

Ichiro Ogimura and Kimiyo Matsuzaki defeated Li-Fu-jung and Han Yu-chen in the final by three sets to one.

== Results ==
Round of 16
(Japan) Ichiro Ogimura (Japan) Kimiyo Matsuzaki	21	11	21	21
(China) Wang Chia-sheng (China) Wang Chien	19	21	18	12
(China) Chuang Tse-tung (China) Chui Chung-hui	21	21	21
(Hungary) László Földy (Hungary) Sarolta Mathe	9	13	12
(Japan) Nobuya Hoshino (Japan) Masako Seki	21	21	17	21
(China) Yang Jui-hua (China) Ti Chiang-hua	19	10	21	18
(Romania) Adalbert Rethi (Romania) Maria Catrinel Folea	21	20	20	21	21
(China) Liang Yu-hai (China) Shih Kuel-ming	12	22	22	16	14
(China) Wang Chuan-yao (China) Sun Mei-ying	3
(China) Su Kuo-hsi (China) Yeh Pei-chun	0
(China) Hu Too-pen (China) Chang Hsiu-ying	3
(China) Chou Lan-sun (China) Ma Kuang-hung	0
(China) Tan Cho-lin (China) Liang Li-chen	21	21	17	22
(Soviet Union) Alguimantas Saunoris (Soviet Union) Signe Paisjarv	10	14	21	20
(China) Li Fu-jung (China) Han Yu-chen	21	21	21
(Japan) Teruo Murakami (Japan) Kazuko Itoh	19	14	17

Quarterfinals
(Japan) Ogimura (Japan) Matsuzaki	25	21	21
(China) Chuang Tse-tung (China) Chui Chung-hui	23	16	16
(Japan) Hoshino (Japan) Seki	21	21	20	21
(Romania) Rethi (Romania) Folea	17	14	22	12
(China) Wang Chuan-yao (China) Sun Mei-ying	3
(China) Hu Too-pen (China) Chang Hsiu-ying	0
(China) Tan Cho-lin (China) Liang Li-chen	4	6	10
(China) Li Fu-jung (China) Han Yu-chen	21	21	21

Semifinals
(Japan) Ogimura (Japan) Matsuzaki	23	15	21	21
(Japan) Hoshino (Japan) Seki	21	21	19	14
(China) Wang Chuan-yao (China) Sun Mei-ying	21	21	21
(China) Li Fu-jung (China) Han Yu-chen	13	4	7

Final
(Japan) Ogimura (Japan) Matsuzaki	21	21	16	21
(China) Li Fu-jung (China) Han Yu-chen	17	14	21	9

== See also ==
List of World Table Tennis Championships medalists
