= 1959 World Table Tennis Championships – Women's doubles =

1959 Women's doubles

The 1959 World Table Tennis Championships women's doubles was the 24th edition of the women's doubles championship. Taeko Namba and Kazuko Ito-Yamaizumi defeated Fujie Eguchi and Kimiyo Matsuzaki in the final by three sets to nil.

== Results ==
Round of 16
(England) Ann Haydon-Jones (England) Diane Rowe	3
(Romania) Maria Biro (Romania) Georgita Pitica	0
(South Korea) Cho Kyung-Cha (South Korea) Choi Kyung-ja	0
(France) Claude Rougagnou (Sweden) Birgitta Tegner	3
(Czechoslovakia) Eva Kroupová (Czechoslovakia) Libuše Grafková	3
(West Germany) Oda Mielenhausen (West Germany) Rosemarie Gomolla	0
(Japan) Taeko Namba (Japan) Kazuko Ito-Yamaizumi	3
(Hungary) Éva Kóczián (Hungary) Lívia Mossóczy	1
(China) Sun Mei-ying (China) Chiu Chung-hui	3
(Canada) Joan Jessop (Canada) Muriel Whait	0
(South Korea) Lee Chong-Hi (South Korea) Hwang Yool-ja	3
(Sweden) Annika Guntsch (Sweden) Lena Guntsch	1
(Hungary) Agnes Simon (United States) Leah Neuberger	3
(England) Pamela Mortimer (England) Kathleen Best	0
(Japan) Fujie Eguchi (Japan) Kimiyo Matsuzaki	3
(England) Elsie Carrington (Czechoslovakia) Emilie Rabasová	0

Quarterfinals
(England) Haydon (England) Rowe	23	21	21
(South Korea) Cho Kyung Cha (South Korea) Choi Kyong-ja	21	9	12
(Czechoslovakia) Kroupová (Czechoslovakia) Grafková	11	13	15
(Japan) Namba (Japan) Ito-Yamaizumi	21	21	21
(China) Sun Mei-ying (China) Chiu Chung-hui	21	15	21	22
(South Korea) Chong Hi Lee (South Korea) Hwang Yool-ja	11	21	9	20
(Hungary) Simon (United States) Neuberger	6	7	11
(Japan) Eguchi (Japan) Matsuzaki	21	21	21

Semifinals
(England) Haydon (England) Rowe	15	22	21	11
(Japan) Namba (Japan) Ito-Yamaizumi	21	24	16	21
(China) Sun Mei-ying (China) Chiu Chung-hui	13	18	12
(Japan) Eguchi (Japan) Matsuzaki	21	21	21

Final
(Japan) Namba (Japan) Ito-Yamaizumi	21	21	21
(Japan) Eguchi (Japan) Matsuzaki	19	15	14

== See also ==
List of World Table Tennis Championships medalists
