= 1959 World Table Tennis Championships – Men's doubles =

1959 Men's doubles

The 1959 World Table Tennis Championships men's doubles was the 25th edition of the men's doubles championship. Ichiro Ogimura and Teruo Murakami won the title after defeating Ladislav Štípek and Ludvík Vyhnanovský in the final by three sets to two.

== Results ==
Round of 16
(Czechoslovakia) Ladislav Štípek (Czechoslovakia) Ludvík Vyhnanovský	3
(Hungary) Zoltán Bubonyi (Hungary) László Pigniczki	0
(Japan) Seiji Narita (Japan) Nobuya Hoshino	3
(France) Marcel Barouh (France) Maurice Granier	1
(Sweden) Hans Alsér (Sweden) Ake Rakell	3
(United Arab Republic) Fawzi El Abrashy (United Arab Republic) Mohamed Safaa	2
(China) Wang Chuanyao (China) Yang Jui-Hua	3
(Poland) Zbigniew Calinski (Poland) Janusz Kusinski	2
(Hungary) Zoltán Berczik (Hungary) László Földy	3
(Czechoslovakia) Jaroslav Staněk (Czechoslovakia) Josef Posejpal	1
(Bulgaria) Alexander Sladkarov (Bulgaria) Vladimir Popov	0
(China) Hu Ping-chuan (China) Hsu Yin-sheng	3
(China) Jung Kuo-tuan (Hungary) Ferenc Sidó	3
(West Germany) Dieter Kohler (West Germany) Heinz Harst	0
(South Vietnam) Trần Văn Liễu (South Vietnam) Lê Văn Tiết	0
(Japan) Ichiro Ogimura (Japan) Teruo Murakami	3

Quarterfinals
(Czechoslovakia) Štípek (Czechoslovakia) Vyhnanovský	18	16	21	21	22
(Japan) Narita (Japan) Hoshino	21	21	12	16	20
(Sweden) Alsér (Sweden) Rakell	9	14	21	22	21
(China) Wang Chuan-Yao (China) Yang Jui-Hua	21	21	17	20	12
(Hungary) Berczik (Hungary) Földy	21	20	21	10	21
(China) Hu Ping-chuan (China) Hsu Yin-sheng	18	22	11	21	19
(China) Jung Kuo-Tuan (Hungary) Sidó	11	12	24	18
(Japan) Ogimura (Japan) Murakami	21	21	22	21

Semifinals
(Czechoslovakia) Štípek (Czechoslovakia) Vyhnanovský	21	22	19	21
(Sweden) Alsér (Sweden) Rakell	10	20	21	13
(Hungary) Berczik (Hungary) Földy	13	21	15	12
(Japan) Ogimura (Japan) Murakami	21	13	21	21

Final
(Czechoslovakia) Štípek (Czechoslovakia) Vyhnanovský	21	21	19	19	14
(Japan) Ogimura (Japan) Murakami	17	19	21	21	21

== See also ==
List of World Table Tennis Championships medalists
