= 1963 World Table Tennis Championships – Women's team =

1963 Corbillon Cup (women's team)

The 1963 World Table Tennis Championships – Corbillon Cup (women's team) was the 20th edition of the women's team championship.

Japan won the gold medal and Romania won the silver medal. China and Hungary won bronze medals after reaching the semi-finals.

== Medalists ==
Event	Gold	Silver	Bronze
	Japan; Kazuko Ito; Kimiyo Matsuzaki; Masako Seki; Noriko Yamanaka	Romania; Maria Alexandru; Ella Constantinescu; Maria Catrinel Folea; Georgita Pitica	China; Liang Lizhen; Qiu Zhonghui; Sun Meiying; Wang Jian
	Japan; Kazuko Ito; Kimiyo Matsuzaki; Masako Seki; Noriko Yamanaka	Romania; Maria Alexandru; Ella Constantinescu; Maria Catrinel Folea; Georgita Pitica	Hungary; Éva Kóczián-Foldi; Erzsebet Heirits; Sarolta Lukacs; Eva Poor

== Final tables ==
=== Group A ===
Pos	Team	P	W	L	Pts
1	Romania	6	6	0	6
2	Poland	6	5	1	5
3	Czechoslovakia	6	4	2	4
4	Austria	6	3	3	3
5	United States	6	2	4	2
6	Denmark	6	1	5	1
7	Scotland	6	0	6	0

=== Group B ===
Pos	Team	P	W	L	Pts
1	China	7	7	0	7
2	East Germany	7	6	1	6
3	Soviet Union	7	5	2	5
4	New Zealand	7	4	3	4
5	Switzerland	7	3	4	3
6	Wales	7	2	5	2
7	Canada	7	1	6	1
8	Luxembourg	7	0	7	0

=== Group C ===
Pos	Team	P	W	L	Pts
1	Japan	8	8	0	8
2	(Socialist Federal Republic of Yugoslavia) Yugoslavia	8	5	3	5
3	Sweden	8	5	3	5
4	Australia	8	5	3	5
5	Bulgaria	8	5	3	5
6	Portugal	8	4	4	4
7	Netherlands	8	3	5	3
8	Brazil	8	1	7	1
9	Norway	8	0	8	0

=== Group D ===
Pos	Team	P	W	L	Pts
1	Hungary	8	7	1	7
2	England	8	7	1	7
3	West Germany	8	7	1	7
4	North Korea	8	4	4	4
5	France	8	4	4	4
6	Indonesia	8	3	5	3
7	Belgium	8	3	5	3
8	North Vietnam	8	1	7	1
9	Italy	8	0	8	0

== Semifinals ==
Team One	Team Two	Score
Romania	China	3–2
Japan	Hungary	3–0

== Final ==
Japan 3		Romania 0	Score
Matsuzaki	bt	Constantinescu	21–17 21–19
Seki	bt	Alexandru	21–16 21–17
Matsuzaki & Seki	bt	Pitica & Alexandru	21–17 21–12

== See also ==
List of World Table Tennis Championships medalists
