= 1956 World Table Tennis Championships – Women's doubles =

1956 Women's doubles

The 1956 World Table Tennis Championships women's doubles was the 22nd edition of the women's doubles championship. Ella Zeller and Angelica Rozeanu defeated Kiiko Watanabe and Fujie Eguchi in the final by three sets to two.

== Results ==
Round of 16
(Romania) Ella Zeller (Romania) Angelica Rozeanu | 21 | 21 | 21
(Japan) Chieko Ikuno (Japan) Hideko Nakayama | 17 | 13 | 18
(India) Nunes Prisca (United States) Pauline Robinson | 17 | 10 | 21 | 21 | 22
(Japan) Chiyoko Yamamoto (Japan) Fujiko Sato | 21 | 21 | 15 | 14 | 20
(Japan) Shizuki Narahara (Japan) Kikuko Yamakawa | 21 | 23 | 21 | 21
(China) Sun Mei-Ying (China) Chiu Chung-Hui | 13 | 25 | 18 | 10
(Japan) Yoshiko Tanaka (Japan) Tomi Okawa | 21 | 21 | 21
(Hong Kong) Lau Wai Lim (Hong Kong) Fan Sin Kwan | 16 | 18 | 4
(England) Ann Haydon-Jones (England) Diane Rowe | 21 | 21 | 21 | 21
(Japan) Chizuko Suda (Japan) Yoshiko Shidara | 12 | 23 | 16 | 16
(Japan) Taeko Namba (Japan) Kiyoko Tasaka | 21 | 21 | 21
(Hong Kong) Baguio Wong (Hong Kong) Chan Yee Ching | 18 | 13 | 8
(United States) Leah Neuberger (United States) Lona Flam | 21 | 17 | 21 | 20 | 21
(Japan) Kazuko Ito-Yamaizumi (Japan) Masako Shirae | 18 | 21 | 19 | 22 | 17
(Japan) Kiiko Watanabe (Japan) Fujie Eguchi
bye

Quarterfinals
(Romania) Zeller (Romania) Rozeanu | 21 | 21 | 21
(India) Prisca (United States) Robinson | 10 | 8 | 13
(Japan) Narahara (Japan) Yamakawa | 9 | 16 | 21 | 21 | 16
(Japan) Tanaka (Japan) Okawa | 21 | 21 | 16 | 18 | 21
(England) Haydon-Jones (England) Rowe | 23 | 18 | 21 | 21
(Japan) Namba (Japan) Tasaka | 20 | 21 | 18 | 16
(United States) Neuberger (United States) Flam | 10 | 9 | 11
(Japan) Watanabe (Japan) Eguchi | 21 | 21 | 21

Semifinals
(Romania) Zeller (Romania) Rozeanu | 21 | 21 | 21
(Japan) Tanaka (Japan) Okawa | 13 | 14 | 15
(England) Haydon-Jones (England) Rowe | 21 | 21 | 13 | 21 | 16
(Japan) Watanabe (Japan) Eguchi | 23 | 14 | 21 | 18 | 21

Final
(Romania) Zeller (Romania) Rozeanu | 21 | 14 | 15 | 21 | 21
(Japan) Watanabe (Japan) Eguchi | 14 | 21 | 21 | 19 | 9

== See also ==
List of World Table Tennis Championships medalists
