= 1961 World Table Tennis Championships – Women's team =

1961 Corbillon Cup (women's team)

The 1961 World Table Tennis Championships – Corbillon Cup (women's team) was the 19th edition of the women's team championship.

Japan won the gold medal, China won the silver medal and Romania won the bronze medal.

== Medalists ==
Event	Gold	Silver	Bronze
	Japan; Kazuko Ito; Kimiyo Matsuzaki; Tomi Okawa; Masako Seki	China; Han Yuzhen; Hu Ke-ming; Sun Mei-ying; Chui Chung-hui	Romania; Maria Alexandru; Maria Catrinel Folea; Georgita Pitica

== Final tables ==
=== Group 1 ===
Pos	Team	P	W	L	Pts
1	Romania	5	5	0	5
2	Hungary	5	4	1	4
3	East Germany	5	3	2	3
4	West Germany	5	2	3	2
5	Poland	5	1	4	1
6	Mongolia	5	0	5	0

=== Group 2 ===
Pos	Team	P	W	L	Pts
1	China	5	5	0	5
2	Czechoslovakia	5	4	1	4
3	Australia	5	2	3	2
3	France	5	2	3	2
3	Bulgaria	5	2	3	2
6	Nepal	5	0	5	0

=== Group 3 ===
Pos	Team	P	W	L	Pts
1	Japan	6	6	0	6
2	Soviet Union	6	5	1	5
3	England	6	4	2	4
4	Sweden	6	3	3	3
5	New Zealand	6	2	4	2
6	North Vietnam	6	1	5	1
7	Ghana	6	0	6	0

=== Final group ===
Pos	Team	P	W	L	Pts
1	Japan	2	2	0	2
2	China	2	1	1	1
3	Romania	2	0	2	0

== Final group matches ==
Japan 5		Romania 0	Score
Itoh	bt	Alexandru	17–21 21–15 21–13
Matsuzaki	bt	Pitica	21–13 21–9
Matsuzaki	bt	Alexandru	21–12 21–10
Itoh	bt	Pitica	21–13 21–13
Matsuzaki & Itoh	bt	Pitica & Alexandru	19–21 23–21 21–10

China 3		Romania 2	Score
Sun Mei-ying	lost to	Alexandru	14–21 17–21
Sun Mei-ying	bt	Pitica	21–17 21–12
Chiu Chung-Hui	bt	Pitica	21–16 18–21 21–18
Chiu Chung-Hui	bt	Alexandru	21–23 21–14 21–16
Hu Ke-ming & Chiu Chung-Hui	lost to	Alexandru & Pitica	13–21 14–21

Japan 3		China 2	Score
Matsuzaki	bt	Sun Mei-ying	20–22 21–12 21–12
Matsuzaki	bt	Chui Chung-hui	21–18 21–8
Itoh	lost to	Chui Chung-hui	16–21 21–17 19–21
Itoh	bt	Sun Mei-ying	21–9 21–18
Matsuzaki & Itoh	lost to	Sun Mei-ying & Chui Chung-hui	21–12 14–21 17–21

== See also ==
List of World Table Tennis Championships medalists
