= 1961 World Table Tennis Championships – Women's doubles =

1961 Women's doubles

The 1961 World Table Tennis Championships women's doubles was the 25th edition of the women's doubles championship. Maria Alexandru and Georgita Pitica defeated Chiu Chung-hui and Sun Mei-ying in the final by three sets to two.

== Results ==
Round of 16
(Japan) Kazuko Ito-Yamaizumi (Japan) Kimiyo Matsuzaki	21	21	21
(China) Tai Lung-chu (China) Chih Hui-fang	11	13	11
(China) Shih Kuoi-ming (China) Ho Yun-fu	10	17	13
(Romania) Maria Alexandru (Romania) Georgita Pitica	21	21	21
(China) Hu Ko-ming (China) Wang Chien	21	21	21
(China) Hsiao Chieh-wen (China) Tu Kuo-jui	17	17	19
(Hungary) Éva Kóczián (Hungary) Sarolta Mathe	13	21	21	21
(Czechoslovakia) Eva Kroupová (Czechoslovakia) Libuše Grafková-Uhrová	21	15	17	13
(China) Sun Mei-ying (China) Chiu Chung-hui	21	21	21
(China) Tai Pei-mei (China) Teng Chu-chun	17	14	5
(China) Liu Mei-ying (China) Wang Hsiu-lan	19	19	18
(China) Chang Hsiu-ying (China) Yang Chiao-lai	21	21	21
(China) Ma Kuang-hung (China) Ti Chiang-hua	21	21	21
(China) Shoo Lan-fang (China) Tung Shu-ying	14	13	9
(Japan) Tomi Okawa (Japan) Masako Seki	16	18	16
(China) Han Yu-chen (China) Liang Li-chen	21	21	21

Quarterfinals
(Japan) Ito-Yamaizumi (Japan) Matsuzaki	22	21	15	16
(Romania) Alexandru (Romania) Pitica	24	18	21	21
(China) Hu Ko-ming (China) Wang Chien	21	21	15	22
(Hungary) Kóczián (Hungary) Mathe	13	12	21	20
(China) Sun Mei-ying (China) Chiu Chung-hui	21	21	21
(China) Chang Hsiu-ying (China) Yang Chiao-lai	11	8	10
(China) Ma Kuang-hung (China) Ti Chiang-hua	13	14	16
(China) Han Yu-chen (China) Liang Li-chen	21	21	21

Semifinals
(Romania) Alexandru (Romania) Pitica	18	21	21	21
(China) Hu Ko-ming (China) Wang Chien	21	17	15	18
(China) Sun Mei-ying (China) Chiu Chung-hui	21	21	21
(China) Han Yu-chen (China) Liang Li-chen	9	5	8

Final
(Romania) Alexandru (Romania) Pitica	21	12	21	17	21
(China) Sun Mei-ying (China) Chiu Chung-hui	14	21	18	21	13

== See also ==
- List of World Table Tennis Championships medalists
