= Table tennis at the 1958 Asian Games =

- Venue: Waseda University Gymnasium
- Dates: 25–31 May 1958
- Competitors: 46 from 7 nations

Table tennis was contested at the 1958 Asian Games in Waseda University Gymnasium, Tokyo, Japan from May 25 to 31 May 1958.

Table tennis had team, doubles and singles events for men and women, as well as a mixed doubles competition.

== Schedule ==
●	Round	●	Last round	P	Preliminary rounds	¼	Quarterfinals	½	Semifinals	F	Final

Event↓/Date →	25th Sun	26th Mon	27th Tue	28th Wed			29th Thu			30th Fri			31st Sat
Men's singles							P			P	¼	½	F
Men's doubles							P	¼	½				F
Men's team	●	●	●	●									
Women's singles							P			¼		½	F
Women's doubles				P	¼	½							F
Women's team	●	●	●										
Mixed doubles				P	¼	½							F

== Medalists ==
Event	Gold	Silver	Bronze
Men's singles	Li Kou-tin; Republic of China	Keisuke Tsunoda; Japan	Seiji Narita; Japan
Men's singles	Li Kou-tin; Republic of China	Keisuke Tsunoda; Japan	Ichiro Ogimura; Japan
Men's doubles	South Vietnam; Mai Văn Hòa; Trần Cảnh Được	Republic of China; Li Kou-tin; Sou Ying-chen	Republic of China; Chen Kao-shan; Hsieh Chin-ho
Men's doubles	South Vietnam; Mai Văn Hòa; Trần Cảnh Được	Republic of China; Li Kou-tin; Sou Ying-chen	South Vietnam; Lê Văn Tiết; Trần Văn Liễu
Men's team	South Vietnam; Lê Văn Tiết; Mai Văn Hòa; Trần Cảnh Được; Trần Văn Liễu	Japan; Seiji Narita; Ichiro Ogimura; Toshiaki Tanaka; Keisuke Tsunoda	Iran; Edmond Beitkhoda; Houshang Bozorgzadeh; Amir Ehteshamzadeh; Hamid Korloo
Women's singles	Taeko Namba; Japan	Kazuko Yamaizumi; Japan	Cho Kyung-ja; South Korea
Women's singles	Taeko Namba; Japan	Kazuko Yamaizumi; Japan	Fujie Eguchi; Japan
Women's doubles	Japan; Fujie Eguchi; Kazuko Yamaizumi	Hong Kong; Baguio Wong; Ng Yuk Chun	South Korea; Wie Sang-sook; Choi Kyung-ja
Women's doubles	Japan; Fujie Eguchi; Kazuko Yamaizumi	Hong Kong; Baguio Wong; Ng Yuk Chun	Republic of China; Chen Pao-pei; Chiang Tsai-yun
Women's team	Japan; Fujie Eguchi; Taeko Namba; Tomi Okawa; Kazuko Yamaizumi	South Korea; Cho Kyung-ja; Choi Kyung-ja; Park Chung-ja; Wie Sang-sook	Republic of China; Chen Pao-pei; Chiang Tsai-yun; Ching Yui; Yao Tsu
Mixed doubles	Japan; Ichiro Ogimura; Fujie Eguchi	Japan; Toshiaki Tanaka; Kazuko Yamaizumi	Japan; Seiji Narita; Tomi Okawa
Mixed doubles	Japan; Ichiro Ogimura; Fujie Eguchi	Japan; Toshiaki Tanaka; Kazuko Yamaizumi	Japan; Keisuke Tsunoda; Taeko Namba

== Medal table ==
Rank	Nation	Gold	Silver	Bronze	Total
1	Japan (JPN)	4	4	5	13
2	South Vietnam (VNM)	2	0	1	3
3	Republic of China (ROC)	1	1	3	5
4	South Korea (KOR)	0	1	2	3
5	Hong Kong (HKG)	0	1	0	1
6	Iran (IRN)	0	0	1	1
Totals (6 entries)		7	7	12	26

== Participating nations ==
A total of 46 athletes from 7 nations competed in table tennis at the 1958 Asian Games:

- Hong Kong (8)
- Iran (6)
- Japan (8)
- Philippines (4)
- Republic of China (8)
- South Korea (8)
- South Vietnam (4)
