= 1963 World Table Tennis Championships – Women's doubles =

1963 Women's doubles

The 1963 World Table Tennis Championships women's doubles was the 26th edition of the women's doubles championship. Kimiyo Matsuzaki and Masako Seki defeated Diane Rowe and Mary Shannon in the final by three sets to one.

== Results ==
Round of 16
(China) Chin Chung-hui (China) Wang Chien	21	21	21
(Romania) Ella Constantinescu (Romania) Maria Catrinel Folea	17	9	6
(China) Hsiao Chieh-wen (China) Shih Feng-liang	17	13	13
(West Germany) Agnes Simon (West Germany) Inge Harst	21	21	21
(Hungary) Éva Foldi-Kóczián (Hungary) Erzsebet Heirits	21	21	21
(Czechoslovakia) Vendula Schwarzová (Czechoslovakia) Libuše Grafková-Uhrová	13	15	16
(North Korea) Jung Sil Kim (North Korea) Kang Ja Yoon	5	13	18
(Japan) Masako Seki (Japan) Kimiyo Matsuzaki	21	21	21
(China) Ti Chuang-hua (China) Liang Li-chen	21	21	21
(West Germany) Edit Buchholz (West Germany) Ingrid Kriegelstein	6	12	16
(Brazil) Nakma Cruz D'Elia (East Germany) Carla Stiebner	11	7	8
(Japan) Kazuko Ito-Yamaizumi (Japan) Noriko Yamanaka	21	21	21
(England) Diane Rowe (England) Mary Shannon	21	21	21
(Hungary) Sarolta Lukács-Mathe (Hungary) Eva Poor	11	14	15
(Czechoslovakia) Irena Bosa (Czechoslovakia) Marta Luzová	21	23	20	21	14
(Romania) Maria Alexandru (Romania) Georgita Pitica	18	25	22	17	21

Quarterfinals
(China) Chin Chung-hui (China) Wang Chien	22	21	21
(West Germany) Simon (West Germany) Harst	13	18	13
(Hungary) Foldi-Kóczián (Hungary) Hierits	12	21	14	18
(Japan) Seki (Japan) Matsuzaki	21	16	21	21
(China) Liang Li-chen (China) Ti Chuang-hua	18	18	15
(Japan) Ito-Yamaizumi (Japan) Yamanaka	21	21	21
(England) Rowe (England) Shannon	22	16	21	21
(Romania) Alexandru (Romania) Pitica	20	21	17	16

Semifinals
(China) Chin Chung-hui (China) Wang Chien	21	13	13	21	16
(Japan) Seki (Japan) Matsuzaki	16	21	21	19	21
(Japan) Ito-Yamaizumi (Japan) Yamanaka	8	23	10	19
(England) Rowe (England) Shannon	21	21	21	21

Final
(Japan) Seki (Japan) Matsuzaki	21	15	21	21
(England) Rowe (England) Shannon	16	21	15	16

== See also ==
List of World Table Tennis Championships medalists
