= 1959 World Table Tennis Championships – Men's team =

1959 Swaythling Cup (men's team)

The 1959 World Table Tennis Championships – Swaythling Cup (men's team) was the 25th edition of the men's team championship.

Japan won the gold medal defeating Hungary 5–1 in the final. China and South Vietnam won bronze medals after elimination from the semi-final round.

== Medalists ==
Event	Gold	Silver	Bronze
Men's team	Japan; Nobuya Hoshino; Teruo Murakami; Seiji Narita; Ichiro Ogimura	Hungary; Zoltán Berczik; Zoltán Bubonyi; László Földy; László Pigniczki; Ferenc Sidó	China; Chiang Yung-Ning; Rong Guotuan; Wang Chuanyao; Xu Yinsheng; Yang Jai-Hua
Men's team	Japan; Nobuya Hoshino; Teruo Murakami; Seiji Narita; Ichiro Ogimura	Hungary; Zoltán Berczik; Zoltán Bubonyi; László Földy; László Pigniczki; Ferenc Sidó	South Vietnam; Lê Văn Tiết; Mai Văn Hòa; Trần Cảnh Được; Trần Văn Liễu

== Swaythling Cup tables ==
=== Group A ===
Pos	Team	P	W	L	Pts
1	Hungary	7	7	0	14
2	Brazil	7	6	1	12
3	Romania	7	5	2	10
4	Poland	7	4	3	8
5	United States	7	3	4	6
6	Switzerland	7	2	5	4
7	Norway	7	1	6	2
8	Venezuela	7	0	7	0

=== Group B ===
Pos	Team	P	W	L	Pts
1	China	8	8	0	16
2	Sweden	8	7	1	14
3	West Germany	8	6	2	12
4	(Egypt) UAR	8	5	3	10
5	Portugal	8	3	5	6
5	Belgium	8	3	5	6
7	Australia	8	2	6	4
8	(Republic of Ireland) Ireland	8	1	7	2
8	Jamaica	8	1	7	0

=== Group C ===
Pos	Team	P	W	L	Pts
1	Japan	9	9	0	18
2	(Socialist Federal Republic of Yugoslavia) Yugoslavia	9	8	1	16
3	India	9	6	3	12
3	Austria	9	6	3	12
5	Netherlands	9	5	4	10
5	East Germany	9	5	4	10
7	Denmark	9	3	6	6
8	Italy	9	1	8	2
8	Luxembourg	9	1	8	2
8	Canada	9	1	8	2

=== Group D ===
Pos	Team	P	W	L	Pts
1	South Vietnam	9	9	0	18
2	Czechoslovakia	9	8	1	16
3	England	9	7	2	14
4	France	9	6	3	12
5	Iran	9	5	4	10
6	Spain	9	4	5	8
7	Lebanon	9	3	6	6
8	Wales	9	2	7	4
9	Greece	9	1	8	2
10	Malta	9	0	9	0

== Semifinals ==
Team One	Team Two	Score
Japan	South Vietnam	5–3
Hungary	China	5–3

== Final ==
Japan 5		Hungary 1	Score
Murakami	bt	Sidó	14–21 21–10 21–17
Ogimura	bt	Bubonyi	21–18 17–21 21–13
Hoshino	bt	Berczik	21–17 21–12
Ogimura	lost to	Sidó	17–21 21–10 14–21
Murakami	bt	Berczik	21–23 21–18 21–17
Hoshino	bt	Burbonyi	21–13 21–13

== See also ==
- List of World Table Tennis Championships medalists
