= 1963 World Table Tennis Championships – Mixed doubles =

1963 Mixed doubles

The 1963 World Table Tennis Championships mixed doubles was the 27th edition of the mixed doubles championship.

Koji Kimura and Kazuko Ito-Yamaizumi defeated Keiichi Miki and Masako Seki in the final by three sets to nil.

== Results ==
Round of 16
(Japan) Ichiro Ogimura (Japan) Kimiyo Matsuzaki	24	21	23	21
(China) Chang Chih-lin (China) Cheng Min-chih	26	14	21	10
(Hungary) János Faházi (Hungary) Éva Földy	21	21	21
(Poland) Janusz Kusiński (Poland) Danuta Szmidt	10	18	16
(China) Hu Tao-pen (China) Ti-Chiang-hua	21	21	21
(Portugal) Luis Choi (Portugal) Emilia Tong	9	9	13
(Japan) Koji Kimura (Japan) Kazuko Ito-Yamaizumi	21	21	21
(Romania) Adalbert Rethi (Romania) Maria Catrinel Folea	9	17	7
(Japan) Keiichi Miki (Japan) Masako Seki	21	21	21
(China) Wang Chia-sheng (China) Wang Chien	9	12	9
(Sweden) Hans Alsér (West Germany) Inge Harst	21	21	13	21
(China) Chou Lan-sun (China) Hu Ke-ming	18	15	21	17
(Japan) Ken Konaka (Japan) Noriko Yamanaka	16	20	21	21	21
(China) Yu Chang-chun (China) Li Ho-nan	21	22	5	19	14
(China) Chuang Tse-tung (China) Chiu Chung-hui	21	21	21
(Czechoslovakia) Vilim Polakovic (Czechoslovakia) Libuše Uhrová	12	13	8

Quarterfinals
(China) Chang Chih-lin (China) Cheng Min-chih	21	21	10	16
(Hungary) Faházi (Hungary) Földy	14	23	21	21
(China) Hu Tao-pen (China) Ti-Chiang-hua	17	21	22	24
(Japan) Kimura (Japan) Ito-Yamaizumi	21	9	20	26
(Japan) Miki (Japan) Seki	21	21	22
(Sweden) Alser (West Germany) Harst	17	15	20
(Japan) Konaka (Japan) Yamanaka	19	12	10
(China) Chuang Tse-tung (China) Chiu Chung-hui	21	21	21

Semifinals
(Hungary) Faházi (Hungary) Földy	21	10	19	10
(Japan) Kimura (Japan) Ito-Yamaizumi	9	21	21	21
(Japan) Miki (Japan) Seki	21	19	21	21
(China) Chuang Tse-tung (China) Chiu Chung-hui	11	21	19	14

Final
(Japan) Kimura (Japan) Ito-Yamaizumi	21	21	21
(Japan) Miki (Japan) Seki	18	14	18

== See also ==
List of World Table Tennis Championships medalists
