= 1961 World Table Tennis Championships – Men's team =

1961 Swaythling Cup (men's team)

The 1961 World Table Tennis Championships – Swaythling Cup (men's team) was the 26th edition of the men's team championship.

China won the gold medal defeating Japan 5–3 in the decisive final group match. Hungary won the bronze medal after finishing third in the final group.

== Medalists ==
=== Team ===
Event	Gold	Silver	Bronze
Men's team	China; Li Fu-jung; Jung Kuo-tuan; Wang Chuanyao; Hsu Yin-sheng; Chuang Tse-tung	Japan; Nobuya Hoshino; Koji Kimura; Teruo Murakami; Ichiro Ogimura; Goro Shibutani	Hungary; Zoltán Berczik; László Földy; Miklós Péterfy; Péter Rózsás; Ferenc Sidó

== Swaythling Cup tables ==
=== Group A ===
Pos	Team	P	W	L	Pts
1	China	8	8	0	16
2	East Germany	8	7	1	14
3	West Germany	8	6	2	12
4	Czechoslovakia	8	5	3	10
5	(Myanmar) Burma	8	4	4	8
6	Ecuador	8	3	5	6
7	Ghana	8	2	6	4
8	Nepal	8	1	7	2
9	Mongolia	8	0	8	0

=== Group B ===
Pos	Team	P	W	L	Pts
1	Hungary	7	7	0	14
2	Sweden	7	6	1	12
3	Romania	7	5	2	10
4	Poland	7	4	3	8
5	Denmark	7	3	4	6
6	Australia	7	1	6	2
6	North Vietnam	7	1	6	2
6	Nigeria	7	1	6	2

=== Group C ===
Pos	Team	P	W	L	Pts
1	Japan	8	9	0	18
2	(Socialist Federal Republic of Yugoslavia) Yugoslavia	8	6	2	12
2	England	8	6	2	12
4	Russia	8	6	3	12
5	North Korea	8	5	4	10
6	Brazil	8	5	4	10
7	Singapore	8	3	6	6
8	New Zealand	8	1	8	2
9	Cuba	8	1	8	2

== Final group results ==
Team One	Team Two	Score
Japan	Hungary	5–2
China	Hungary	7–2
China	Japan	5–3

=== Final standings ===
Pos	Team	P	W	L	Pts
1	China	2	2	0	4
2	Japan	2	1	1	2
3	Hungary	3	0	2	0

=== Decisive final group match ===
China 5		Japan 3	Score
Chuang Tse-tung	bt	Hoshino	21–14 24–22
Chuang Tse-tung	bt	Ogimura	21–13 21–13
Hsu Yin-sheng	lost to	Kimura	21–17 17–21 17–21
Hsu Yin-sheng	bt	Ogimura	21–7 210-8
Hsu Yin-sheng	bt	Hoshino	21–23 21–18 21–17
Jung Kuo-tuan	lost to	Ogimura	19–21 19–21
Jung Kuo-tuan	lost to	Kimura	11–21 21–15 17–21
Jung Kuo-tuan	bt	Hoshino	21–15 20–22 21–18

== See also ==
List of World Table Tennis Championships medalists
