= 1961 World Table Tennis Championships – Women's singles =

1961 Women's singles

The 1961 World Table Tennis Championships women's singles was the 26th edition of the women's singles championship. Chiu Chung-Hui defeated Éva Kóczián in the final by three sets to two, to win the title.

== Results ==
Round of 16
(China) Chiu Chung-Hui	21	21	8	24
(Romania) Maria Alexandru	17	11	21	22
(China) Han Yu-chen	21	18	21	21
(China) Tai Lung-chu	19	21	17	14
(Hungary) Sarolta Mathe	17	21	15	21	21
(China) Hu Ko-ming	21	18	21	17	17
(China) Wang Chien	w/o
(China) Wang Hsui-lan
(Hungary) Éva Kóczián	19	21	21	21
(West Germany) Jutta Kruse	21	19	6	13
(China) Sun Mei-Ying	16	21	21	15	21
(Japan) Masako Seki	21	18	10	21	15
(England) Diane Rowe	19	21	17	21	21
(Hungary) Ilona Kerekes	21	12	21	9	17
(China) Liang Li-chen	21	17	17	12
(Japan) Kimiyo Matsuzaki	19	21	21	21

Quarterfinals
(China) Chiu Chung-Hui	w/o
(China) Han Yu-chen
(Hungary) Mathe	22	16	10	14
(China) Wang Chien	20	21	21	21
(Hungary) Kóczián	19	21	21	21
(China) Sun Mei-Ying	21	18	18	19
(England) Rowe	11	12	10
(Japan) Matsuzaki	21	21	21

Semifinals
(China) Chiu Chung-Hui	21	21	21
(China) Wang Chien	7	13	13
(Hungary) Kóczián	17	22	22	21
(Japan) Matsuzaki	21	20	20	16

Final
(China) Chiu Chung-Hui	19	21	14	21	21
(Hungary) Kóczián	21	19	21	18	19

== See also ==
List of World Table Tennis Championships medalists
