= 1961 World Table Tennis Championships – Men's doubles =

1961 Men's doubles

The 1961 World Table Tennis Championships men's doubles was the 26th edition of the men's doubles championship. Koji Kimura and Nobuya Hoshino won the title after defeating Zoltán Berczik and Ferenc Sidó in the final by three sets to one.

== Results ==
Round of 16
(Hungary) Zoltán Berczik (Hungary) Ferenc Sidó	21	19	21	21
(China) Hu Tao-Pen (China) Tan Cho-Lin	17	21	13	17
(China) Wu Hung (China) Wang Hung-Chi	w/o
(China) Wang Chuan-Yao (China) Hsu Yin-Sheng	scr
(Japan) Ichiro Ogimura (Japan) Teruo Murakami	21	21	21
(West Germany) Conny Freundorfer (West Germany) Martin Ness	14	12	19
(Sweden) Hans Alsér (Sweden) Tony Larsson	21	21	13	18	13
(China) Chou Lan-Sun (China) Wang Chia-Sheng	23	17	21	21	21
(Japan) Koji Kimura (Japan) Nobuya Hoshino	21	21	21
(China) Tsai Ming-Shu (China) Tu Han-Kong	15	19	16
(China) Jung Kuo-Tuan (China) Yang Jui-Hua	w/o
(China) Chu Jen-Ling (China) Ma Chin-Pao	scr
(Hungary) Péter Rózsás (Hungary) Miklós Péterfy	20	21	22	21
(Romania) Radu Negulescu (Romania) Adalbert Rethi	22	17	20	8
(China) Chuang Tse-Tung (China) Li Fu-Jung	21	21	21
(Japan) Goro Shibutani (Japan) Keiichi Miki	6	18	19

Quarterfinals
(Hungary) Berczik (Hungary) Sidó	18	21	18	24	21
(China) Wang Chuan-Yao (China) Hsu Yin-Sheng	21	10	21	22	18
(Japan) Ogimura (Japan) Murakami	21	14	19	18
(China) Chou Lan-Sun (China) Wang Chia-Sheng	19	21	21	21
(Japan) Kimura (Japan) Hoshino	w/o
(China) Jung Kuo-Tuan (China) Yang Jui-Hua	scr
(Hungary) Rózsás (Hungary) Péterfy	17	19	14
(China) Chuang Tse-Tung (China) Li Fu-Jung	21	21	21

Semifinals
(Hungary) Berczik (Hungary) Sidó	21	21	21
(China) Chou Lan-Sun (China) Wang Chia-Sheng	13	15	19
(Japan) Kimura (Japan) Hoshino	21	12	21	21
(China) Chuang Tse-Tung (China) Li Fu-Jung	14	21	11	15

Final
(Hungary) Berczik (Hungary) Sidó	18	27	19	13
(Japan) Kimura (Japan) Hoshino	21	25	21	21

== See also ==
List of World Table Tennis Championships medalists
