= 1959 World Table Tennis Championships – Men's singles =

1959 Men's singles

The 1959 World Table Tennis Championships men's singles was the 25th edition of the men's singles championship.

Jung Kuo-tuan defeated Ferenc Sidó in the final, winning three sets to one to secure the title, became the first ever Chinese player to win a gold medal in the competition.

== Results ==
Round of 16
(Hungary) Zoltán Berczik	21	21	21
(China) Li Jen Su	5	12	12
(China) Jung Kuo-tuan	21	17	21	21
(Japan) Nobuya Hoshino	18	21	16	14
(China) Yang Jai-Hua	21	21	21
(South Vietnam) Trần Văn Liễu	17	19	8
(United States) Dick Miles	11	26	21	21
(China) Hsu Yin-Sheng	21	24	13	13
(China) Wang Chuan-Yao	19	21	21	26	22
(Hungary) Zoltán Bubonyi	21	5	13	28	20
(Hungary) Ferenc Sidó	19	21	19	21	21
(Japan) Teruo Murakami	21	15	21	7	15
(China) Chuang Chia-Fu	14+	8+	9+	7+	13+
(South Vietnam) Mai Văn Hòa	13	6	15	10	8
(Japan) Ichiro Ogimura	21	21	16	21
(Sweden) Tony Larsson	17	11	21	16

Quarterfinals
(Hungary) Berczik	21	15	19	21	5
(China) Kuo-tuan	17	21	21	18	21
(China) Jai-Hua	19	18	17
(United States) Miles	21	21	21
(China) Chuan-Yao	13	21	16
(Hungary) Sidó	21	23	21
(China) Chia-Fu	19	18	20
(Japan) Ogimura	21	21	22

Semifinals
(China) Kuo-tuan	22	23	12	21	21
(United States) Miles	20	25	21	18	8
(Hungary) Sidó	21	21	11	12	21
(Japan) Ogimura	16	13	21	21	18

Final
(China) Kuo-tuan	19	21	21	21
(Hungary) Sidó	21	12	15	14

+ Time limit rule applies

== See also ==
List of World Table Tennis Championships medalists
