= 1963 World Table Tennis Championships – Women's singles =

1963 Women's singles

The 1963 World Table Tennis Championships women's singles was the 27th edition of the women's singles championship. Kimiyo Matsuzaki defeated Maria Alexandru in the final by three sets to two, to win the title.

== Results ==
Round of 16
(Japan) Kimiyo Matsuzaki | 21 | 21 | 21
(Romania) Georgita Pitica | 8 | 16 | 15
(Hungary) Agnes Simon-Almási | 20 | 17 | 21 | 8
(China) Liang Li-chen | 22 | 21 | 15 | 21
(Romania) Ella Constantinescu-Zeller | 13 | 24 | 21 | 21
(Japan) Kazuko Ito-Yamaizumi | 21 | 22 | 17 | 12
(China) Li Ho-nan | 21 | 21 | 21
(Soviet Union) Laima Balaishite | 15 | 13 | 18
(China) Sun Mei-Ying | 21 | 21 | 21
(China) Lin Hui-ching | 10 | 11 | 13
(England) Diane Rowe | 12 | 210 | 7
(Hungary) Erzsebet Heirits | 21 | 21 | 21
(Romania) Maria Alexandru | 14 | 21 | 17 | 20 | 21
(Hungary) Sarolta Lukacs-Mathe | 21 | 18 | 9 | 22 | 14
(Japan) Noriko Yamanaka | 21 | 21 | 21
(China) Chiu Chung-Hui | 18 | 19 | 17

Quarterfinals
(Japan) Matsuzaki | 23 | 21 | 21
(China) Liang Li-chen | 21 | 18 | 18
(Romania) Constantinescu-Zeller | 21 | 21 | 17 | 21
(China) Li Ho-nan | 17 | 19 | 21 | 10
(China) Sun Mei-Ying | 21 | 21 | 21
(Hungary) Heirets | 18 | 19 | 18
(Romania) Alexandru | 21 | 20 | 21 | 11 | 21
(Japan) Yamanaka | 16 | 22 | 18 | 21 | 19

Semifinals
(Japan) Matsuzaki | 16 | 21 | 21 | 21
(Romania) Constantinescu-Zeller | 21 | 15 | 10 | 10
(China) Sun Mei-ying | 10 | 22 | 12
(Romania) Alexandru | 21 | 21 | 21

Final
(Japan) Matsuzaki | 21 | 21 | 20 | 15 | 21
(Romania) Alexandru | 14 | 13 | 22 | 21 | 17

== See also ==
List of World Table Tennis Championships medalists
