= 1959 World Table Tennis Championships – Women's singles =

1959 Women's singles

The 1959 World Table Tennis Championships women's singles was the 25th edition of the women's singles championship. Kimiyo Matsuzaki defeated Fujie Eguchi in the final by three sets to one, to win the title.

== Results ==
Round of 16
(England) Ann Haydon	18	21	16	21	21
(South Korea) Choi Kyung-ja	21	8	21	17	10
(China) Chiu Chung-Hui	21	21	21
(Poland) Eliza Lida	12	10	6
(Hungary) Agnes Almási-Simon	21	21	21
(Hungary) Sarolta Mathe	19	11	11
(Romania) Maria Biro	12	18	9
(Japan) Kimiyo Matsuzaki	21	21	21
(Hungary) Éva Kóczián	21	15	21	21
(England) Kathleen Best	16	21	11	16
(Poland) Danuto Szmidt	5	14	8
(Japan) Taeko Namba	21	21	21
(Hungary) Gizi Lantos-Farkas	21	21	21
(West Germany) Sigrun Kunz	5	11	16
(South Korea) Cho Kyung-Cha	15	21	16
(Japan) Fujie Eguchi	21	23	21

Quarterfinals
(England) Haydon	16	13	17
(China) Chiu Chung-Hui	21	21	21
(Hungary) Almási-Simon	14	11	20
(Japan) Matsuzaki	21	21	21
(Hungary) Kóczián	21	21	15	21
(Japan) Namba	17	18	21	12
(Hungary) Lantos-Farkas	8	20	15
(Japan) Eguchi	21	22	21

Semifinals
(China) Chiu Chung-Hui	17	14	14
(Japan) Matsuzaki	21	21	21
(Hungary) Kóczián	17	11	21	20
(Japan) Eguchi	21	21	8	22

Final
(Japan) Matsuzaki	21	21	18	21
(Japan) Eguchi	13	7	21	18

== See also ==
List of World Table Tennis Championships medalists
