= Rakell =

Rakell is a Swedish surname. Notable people with the surname include:

- Åke Rakell (born 1935), Swedish table tennis player
- Rickard Rakell (born 1993), Swedish ice hockey player
