= Barouh =

Barouh is a French surname. It can also rarely appear as an anglicised form of the masculine given name Baruch. Notable people with the name include:

== Surname ==
- François Barouh (born 1955), French sprint canoer
- Marcel Barouh (1934–2025), French table tennis player
- Maxence Barouh (born 1995), French canoeist
- Pierre Barouh (1934–2016), French writer-composer-singer

== Given name ==
- Barouh Berkovits (born Baruch Berkowitz; 1926–2012), Slovak-born American bioengineer
