= László Pigniczki =

Hungarian table tennis player and coach

Personal information
- Nationality: Hungary
- Born: 9 August 1937 (age 88) Budapest
Medal record
Representing Hungary
World Championships
Silver medal – second place	1959	Men's Team

László Pigniczki is a male former international table tennis player from Hungary. His granddaughter is Fanni Pigniczki, who competed in rhythmic gymnastics at Tokyo 2020 Olympics.

== Table tennis career ==
He won a silver medal at the 1959 World Table Tennis Championships in the Swaythling Cup (men's team event) for Hungary with Zoltán Berczik, László Földy, Zoltán Bubonyi and Ferenc Sidó.

He was part of the Hungarian national team from 1957 to 1967 and was national doubles champion in 1964 with János Faházi and singles champion in 1965 and ranked Hungarian number one in 1966. At the European Table Tennis Championships he won a double bronze in 1964.

After retiring he was a table tennis coach.

== See also ==
- List of table tennis players
- List of World Table Tennis Championships medalists
