= Zoltán Bubonyi =

Hungarian table tennis player

Personal information
- Nationality: Hungary
- Born: 1935
- Died: 2017 (aged 81–82)
Medal record
Representing Hungary
World Championships
Silver medal – second place	1959	Men's Team

Zoltán Bubonyi (1935-2017), was a male international table tennis player from Hungary.

== Table tennis career ==
He won a silver medal at the 1959 World Table Tennis Championships in the Swaythling Cup (men's team event) for Hungary with Zoltán Berczik, László Földy, László Pigniczki and Ferenc Sidó.

He also won three European Table Tennis Championships medals (two of which were gold). He represented Hungary on 18 occasions from 1957 to 1960.

== See also ==
- List of table tennis players
- List of World Table Tennis Championships medalists
