= Rickard Rakell =

Swedish ice hockey player (born 1993)

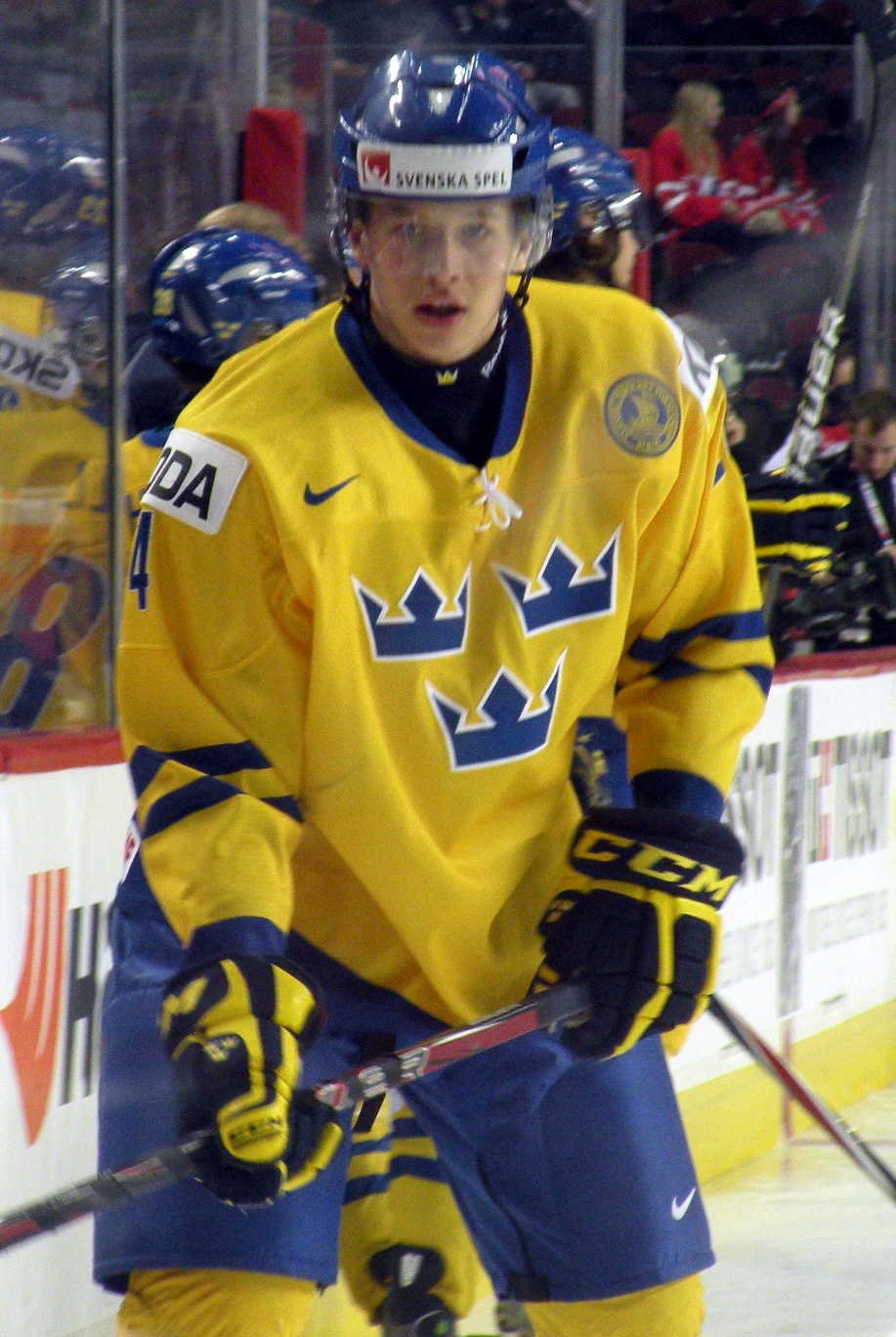
- Rakell with Sweden in 2012
- Born: 5 May 1993 (age 33) Sollentuna, Sweden
- Height: 6 ft 1 in (185 cm)
- Weight: 194 lb (88 kg; 13 st 12 lb)
- Position: Forward
- Shoots: Right
- NHL team Former teams: Pittsburgh Penguins; Anaheim Ducks
- National team: Sweden
- NHL draft: 30th overall, 2011; Anaheim Ducks
- Playing career: 2013–present

Rickard Lars Gunnar Roland Rakell (born 5 May 1993) is a Swedish professional ice hockey player who is a forward for the Pittsburgh Penguins of the National Hockey League (NHL).

While playing for the AIK IF in Sweden, Rakell was drafted 41st overall by the Plymouth Whalers in the Ontario Hockey League's (OHL) 2010 Import Draft. Upon finishing his rookie season with the Whalers, Rakell was drafted in the first round, 30th overall, by the Anaheim Ducks in the 2011 NHL entry draft. He remained with the Whalers for two more seasons before joining the Ducks for four games at the start of their 2012–13 season. Upon making his NHL debut on 19 January 2013, Rakell became the sixth youngest player to appear in a game for the Ducks at 19 years, eight months and 14 days. To avoid burning the first year of his entry-level contract, Rakell was reassigned to the Whalers for the remainder of the 2012–13 regular season.

Rakell played within the Ducks organization for nine seasons, during which he set numerous person and franchise records. His on-ice success also helped the Ducks qualify for the Stanley Cup playoffs five times during his tenure with the team. During the 2014 Stanley Cup playoffs, Rakell became the first player in franchise history to score their first career goal in the playoffs. He also helped the Ducks set a franchise record for most playoff power play goals with four during Game 5 of the team's first-round series against the Dallas Stars. Two years later, he became the fourth-youngest Duck to eclipse 30 goals in a season and the first NHL player under the age of 24 with 10 game-winning goals since Steven Stamkos in 2011–12.

Internationally, Rakell has represented Sweden at both the junior and senior levels. He made his debut for Sweden as the youngest player on the 2011 World Junior Ice Hockey Championships roster. Rakell helped Team Sweden win gold at the 2018 IIHF World Championship while making his senior team debut at the international level.

== Early life ==
Rakell was born on 5 May 1993 in Sollentuna, Sweden, to parents Roland and Annika. He grew up in Stockholm alongside his brother Robin and sister Rebecka. As his grandfather Åke Rakell was a professional table tennis player, Rakell played the sport until he was 14, when he dedicated his focus to ice hockey. Growing up in Stockholm, Rakell idolized Toronto Maple Leafs forward Mats Sundin and, later Patric Hornqvist. Rakell's cousin Mathias also plays ice hockey.

== Playing career ==
=== Major junior ===
While growing up in Sweden, Rakell played for the AIK IF in both the J18 Elit and J20 Elit. He played in a defensive role until he was 14 when he switched to forward to score more. After recording 25 points in the J18 Allsv and four points in the J20, Rakell was drafted 41st overall by the Plymouth Whalers in the Ontario Hockey League's (OHL) 2010 Import Draft. Rakell later stated that fellow Swede Gabriel Landeskog was a major influence in encouraging him to move to North America. As he was a year older, Landeskog had already begun playing in North America and was proving to be very successful in the OHL. Upon moving to North America, Rakell began his rookie season with the Whalers during the 2010–11 season. He originally enrolled in a local high school but eventually dropped out due to his lack of North American-based knowledge. He would eventually earn the equivalent of a high school diploma online. Rakell began the season strong by tallying 23 points through his first 25 OHL games and thus earned a spot in the CHL/NHL Top Prospects Game. Following the Top Prospects Game, Rakell was ranked 34th among all OHL players eligible for the 2011 NHL entry draft in the NHL Central Scouting Bureau's Midterm Rankings list. He finished his rookie season with 20 goals and 43 points in 49 games and was ranked 30th among all OHL draft players eligible. After attending the NHL Combine, Rakell was drafted in the first round, 30th overall, by the Anaheim Ducks in the 2011 NHL entry draft.

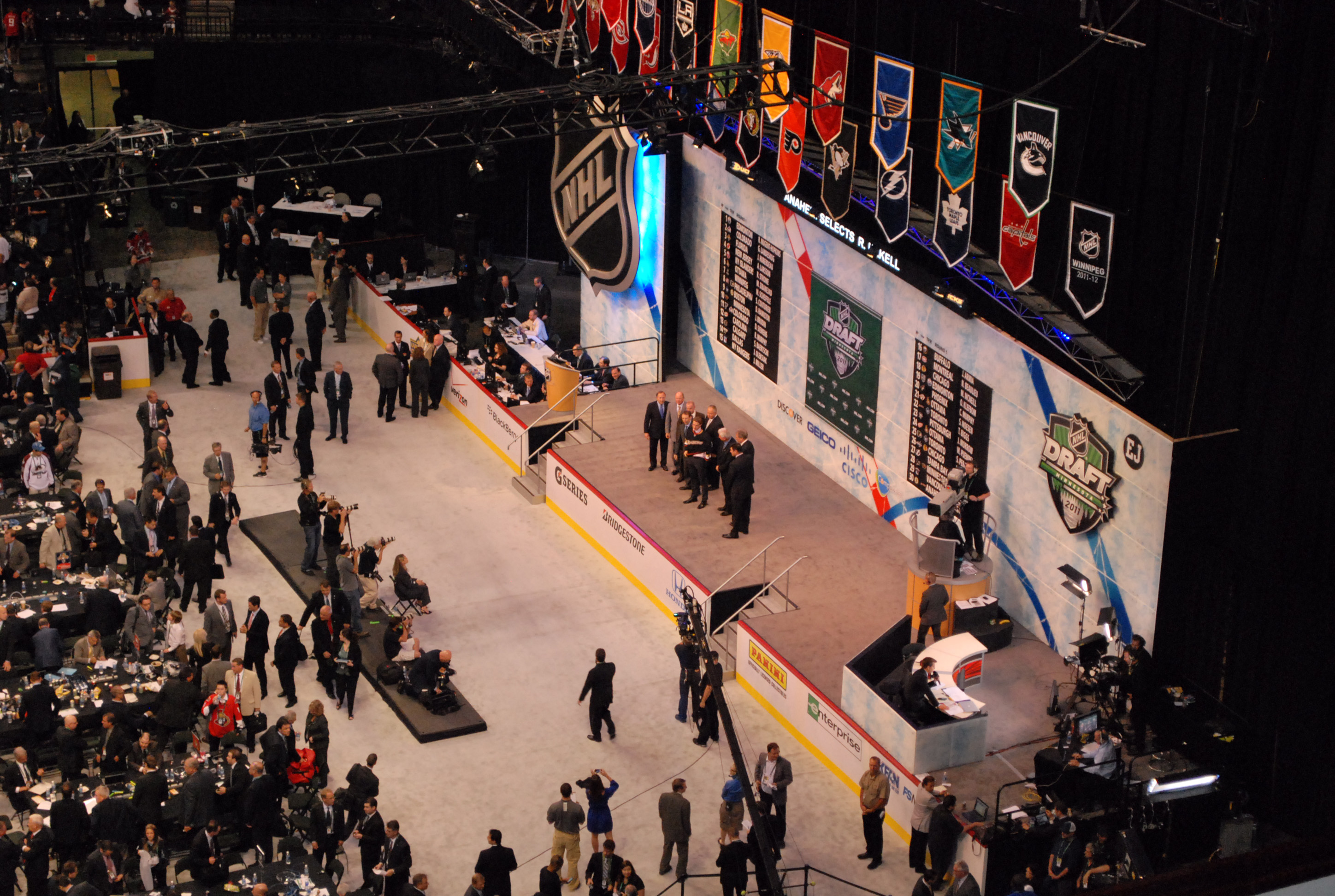
Rakell on stage during the 2011 NHL entry draft

Following the draft, Rakell participated in the Ducks' training camp but was returned to the Whalers to start the 2011–12 season. This would prove to be a breakout season for Rakell, who surpassed his previous season's totals in goals, assists, and points. By 12 December 2011, Rakell co-led his team with 16 goals and ranked second with 20 assists for 36 points through 31 games. By late January, this had improved to 22 goals and 23 assists for 45 points through 39 games. As the Whalers qualified for the OHL playoffs, Rakell continued to build on his solid rookie campaign with an even better second year. He finished the regular season with 28 goals, including eight on the power play, with 34 assists over 60 games. Leading up to their playoff run, Rakell was voted Best Defensive Forward in the Western Conference Coaches Poll. Rakell and the Whalers eliminated the Guelph Storm in six games and met with the Kitchener Rangers in the Quarterfinals. He finished the postseason leading the Whalers with 10 assists while ranking third in points with 12.

During the offseason, Rakell signed a three-year entry-level contract with the Ducks on 3 July 2012. He again participated in their training camp before being returned to the OHL for the 2012–13 season, his final year of major junior hockey. While the 2012–13 NHL lockout was occurring, Rakell began his third year with the Whalers by accumulating 13 goals and 17 assists through 32 games. Once the lockout concluded, he participated in their training camp and made their opening night roster. He subsequently made his NHL debut on 19 January 2013, against the Vancouver Canucks. Following his debut, Rakel became the sixth youngest player to appear in a game for the Ducks at 19 years, eight months and 14 days. He remained in the Ducks' lineup and played on the team's "First-Round Line" alongside fellow first-round picks Kyle Palmieri and Emerson Etem. To avoid burning the first year of his entry-level contract, Rakell was reassigned to the Whalers on 13 February, after going scoreless with a minus-2 rating in four games. Upon rejoining the Whalers, Rakell was named the OHL Player of the Week ending on 24 February, after he accumulated six goals and three assists for nine points through four games. He finished the 2012–13 regular season with 21 goals and 23 assists for 44 points through 40 games.

=== Professional ===
==== Anaheim Ducks ====
After attending the Ducks' 2013 training camp and preseason, Rakell was reassigned to their American Hockey League (AHL) affiliate, the Norfolk Admirals, to begin the 2013–14 season. Rakell began his first season with the Admirals by recording five points and six penalty minutes through his first nine games. He co-led the team in scoring, goals and appearances and ranked second in power-play goals. He was called up to the NHL level on 28 October 2013, but did not appear in a game before being returned to the Admirals on 31 October. In his following three games with the Admirals, Rakell added one more point before being recalled back to the NHL level on 3 November. He shortly thereafter made his season debut and eventually tallied his first career NHL point, an assist, on 8 November 2013 in a game against the Buffalo Sabres. Despite missing a few games, Rakell continued his scoring prowess upon returning to the Admirals and ranked second on the team with six goals and four assists for 10 points through 16 games. By the end of February 2014, Rakell had accumulated 11 points with the Anaheim Ducks and shared the Admirals team lead in points with 34 through 31 games. When he earned his final recall to the NHL level on 20 March, he had collected 14 goals and 23 assists for 37 points through 46 games. He left the Admirals while ranked third on the team in points, second in assists and power-play goals, and tied for third in goals. Rakell finished the 2013–14 season with the Ducks by tallying four assists through 18 games.

As the Ducks qualified for the 2014 Stanley Cup playoffs, Rakell made his postseason debut on 23 April in game 4 of the first-round series against the Dallas Stars. As he was a replacement for an injured Ryan Getzlaf, Rakell played on the Ducks' top line alongside Corey Perry and Emerson Etem. He scored his first career NHL goal on the power play during game 5 to help lift the Ducks to a 6–2 win. Rakell thus became the first player in franchise history to score their first career goal in the playoffs. In same game Rakell also helped set another franchise record for most playoff power play goals as four Ducks' players scored on the power play during the game.

As Rakell was still officially a rookie by the NHL's standards, he participated in the Ducks' rookie camp before the start of the 2014–15 season. Due to injuries across the Ducks' lineup, Rakell made the teams' opening night roster for his first full rookie season at the NHL level. However, Rakell spent the majority of the season battling with fellow Swede William Karlsson for Anaheim's fourth-line centre spot. His play would also be marred with inconsistency and long scoring droughts as he was made a healthy scratch six times through the Ducks' first 16 games. By 2 December 2014, Rakell had earned three assists and accumulated four penalty minutes through 17 games. He was reassigned to the Admirals for two games, where he collected four points, before rejoining the Ducks on 6 December. Between 10 December 2014 and 7 January 2015, Rakell scored four points. One of those points included his first regular-season NHL goal on 23 December in a game against the San Jose Sharks. On 11 January, Rakell tied a franchise record for most points by a rookie in a single game after he tallied two goals and two assists in a 5–4 shootout win over the Winnipeg Jets. As his production continued to increase, he won the Ducks' third-line centre position, and the Ducks traded Karlsson to the Columbus Blue Jackets. The Ducks and Rakell continued to find success, and they set a new franchise record in March for the all-time longest winning streak. As Rakell helped the Ducks qualify for the 2015 Stanley Cup playoffs, he finished the regular season with nine goals and 22 assists in 71 games. During the Ducks' first-round matchup against the Winnipeg Jets, Rakell played on the third line alongside Andrew Cogliano and Kyle Palmieri. On this line, he tallied the game-winning overtime goal in game 3 over the Winnipeg Jets. This would prove to be his only point of the playoffs as he remained pointless through the next 13 games.

Rakell returned to the Ducks for the 2015–16 season, the final year of his entry-level contract. As the Ducks began the season with a 1–7–2 record, Rakell originally started the season centring the Ducks’ third line. However, as the season progressed, he began to see time on the Ducks' top line alongside Corey Perry and Ryan Getzlaf. In late November 2015, Rakell was moved to the left wing of Getzlaf and Perry, and the trio immediately developed chemistry. In his first few games on the line, Rakell accumulated four goals and four assists while also playing an instrumental role in the Ducks' offense. On 24 November, Rakell and Perry scored two goals apiece and the trio combined for 10 points total in their 5–3 win over the Calgary Flames. Following the acquisition of David Perron in January 2016, coach Bruce Boudreau chose to split up Getzlaf and Perry and reinvent the Ducks' top line. In the first nine games following the Perron trade, Getzlaf had accumulated 11 points, Perry 10, Rakell nine, and Perron eight. By 24 February, Rakell ranked second on the team with 15 goals and third on the team with 33 points. The Ducks maintained a 21–5–2 record following the trade before Perron suffered a shoulder injury in late March. As such, Rakell began playing on the Ducks' second line with Jamie McGinn and Mike Santorelli while Brandon Pirri, played left wing on the top line with Getzlaf and Perry. This was short-lived, as Rakell was soon sidelined due to appendicitis. Rakell subsequently missed the remainder of the regular season following his appendectomy, but returned to the lineup for game 1 of the first-round series against the Nashville Predators. However, it was later revealed that he had pushed himself to return in time for the playoffs and "never felt like himself" during their first-round elimination.

Once the Ducks were eliminated from the 2016 playoffs, Rakell was named as a replacement of Alexander Steen for Sweden at the 2016 World Cup of Hockey. He tallied one assist in 13:47 of ice time in a pretournament game before being forced to undergo further surgery to remove scar tissue from his stomach as a result of his appendectomy. While recovering from the surgery in Sweden, Rakell began his contract negotiations with the Ducks. As he was unable to train with the team while negotiating, Rakell skated with his cousin's junior team in Sweden. He eventually signed a six-year contract with an average annual value of $3.8 million on 14 October 2016. Visa issues further delayed Rakell's return and he made his season debut 10 games into the 2016–17 season. He tallied one goal and two assists in his season debut as the Ducks shutout the Los Angeles Kings 4–0 on 1 November. He continued to produce points and quickly accumulated three goals and six points in his first three games of the season. Despite missing two games in early December with a lower-body injury, Rakell tallied 10 goals and four assists for 14 points through his first 16 games. Throughout December, Rakell was moved between the Ducks' lines and alternated between playing wing and centre. On 15 January 2017, Rakell scored his 18th goal of the 2016–17 season in his 200th career NHL game as the Ducks fell to the St. Louis Blues in overtime. Leading up to the 2017 NHL All-Star Game, Rakell led the Ducks with 20 goals and tied for second in the NHL in goals per game. In the Ducks' first game back following the break, Rakell scored his team-leading and career-high 21st goal of the season as the Ducks beat the Colorado Avalanche 5–1. Rakell continued to lead the team through February and March while playing on a line with Patrick Eaves and Getzlaf. Rakell finished the regular season with a career-high 33 goals, including a league-leading 10 game-winning goals, and 51 points through 71 games. He became he fourth-youngest Ducks' player to eclipse 30 goals in a season and the first NHL player under the age of 24 with 10 game-winning goals since Steven Stamkos.

Rakell continued to lead the Ducks during the 2017 Stanley Cup playoffs as he tallied seven goals and 13 points through 15 playoff games. In the first-round series against the Calgary Flames, Ducks coach Randy Carlyle placed Nate Thompson on Rakell's line with Corey Perry in game 3. The trio combined for three goals and seven assists in the final two games of the series. Rakell tallied two goals and five points as the Ducks swept the Flames in four games. When the Ducks met with the Edmonton Oilers in the second round, Rakell was reunited with Getzlaf on the Ducks' top line. During game 5, Rakell, Getzlaf, and Cam Fowler scored for Anaheim in the final 3:16 of regulation to lead them to an eventual win. They became the only team in NHL history to win a playoff game in overtime after trailing by three or more goals with less than four minutes to play. By the time the Ducks eliminated the Oilers, Rakell had added four more goals to his points total. Rakell continued to excel for the Ducks as they met the Nashville Predators in the conference finals. He recorded three points in four games before suffering an injury in game 4. He finished the postseason with career highs in goals, assists, and points. Following their postseason elimination, the Ducks listed Rakell as one of their seven forwards to protect ahead of the 2017 NHL expansion draft.

Although the Ducks began the 2017–18 season without Getzlaf, Rakell continued his momentum from the previous season and tallied seven points through his first 11 games. By mid-November 2017, Rakell was playing left wing on the Ducks' top line with centre Derek Grant and right wing Corey Perry. Although he experienced a short scoring drought in early November, he quickly amassed six points over four games, including three power-play assists in a win over the Vancouver Canucks on 9 November. This success would prove to be short-lived as he then missed five games while recovering from an upper-body injury. He returned to the Ducks' lineup on 5 December, with one shot on goal in 19:33 minutes of ice time in their 4–3 shootout loss to the Vegas Golden Knights. Following his return, Rakell would pick up momentum and hit numerous personal milestones and franchise records through December and January. He tallied his 20th career game-winning goal on 29 December, while also matching his career-best four-game goal streak. He subsequently became the fourth player in the league to reach that mark. The following game, Rakell extended his career-high goal streak to five consecutive games with his second multi-goal game of the season. His five-game goal streak marked Anaheim's longest since Corey Perry scored in seven straight in 2013. On 2 January 2018, Rakell pushed his goal streak to a career-best six consecutive games. His goal streak would end the following game with seven goals over six games. By 22 January, Rakell had accumulated 17 goals and 18 assists for 35 points through 43 games. As a result of his overall play, he received a spot on the Pacific Division team for the 2018 NHL All-Star Game. Upon returning from the All-Star Game, Rakell extended his assist/point streak to four games, tying his career high for assists in consecutive games. He later recorded his first career NHL hat-trick on 25 February, in a 6–5 shootout loss to the Edmonton Oilers. Rakell became the second player since the 1967 NHL expansion draft to tie a game with two goals in the last minute of regulation to force overtime and the first to score a hat trick with two or more goals in the final 30 seconds. On 2 March, Rakell scored his fourth goal in two games to reach a new career-high 53 points. By 4 April, Rakell ranked first on the team with 32 goals as the Ducks qualified for the 2018 Stanley Cup playoffs. Rakell finished the 2017–18 season with new career-highs in goals, assists, and points through 77 games. He became the first player to lead the Ducks in points other than Getzlaf, Perry or Teemu Selänne since Sergei Fedorov in 2003–04.

After struggling to score throughout the season, Rakell found success and chemistry with rookies Sam Steel and Jakob Silfverberg instead of his usual linemates Getzlaf and Perry. After scoring in the first game of the 2018–19 season, Rakell experienced an eight-game goalless drought that was snapped on 23 October 2018. Along with his second goal of the season, Rakell also collected four assists for five points over seven games. By 14 November, Rakell had tallied three goals and 10 assists for 13 points over 19 games to be on pace for 56 points through 82 games. Later in the month, Rakell tallied his fourth goal of the season, 22nd game-winner, and the 100th of his career in 2–1 win over the Oilers. A few weeks later, Rakell was placed on injured reserve with a sprained ankle. At the time of the injury, he had tallied five goals through 30 games. Rakell missed 13 games to recover from the injury and returned to the lineup on 9 January 2019, for their 2–1 overtime loss to the Ottawa Senators. He also helped the Ducks snap their 12 games losing streak by tallying one goal in their 3–0 win over the Minnesota Wild on 17 January. Rakell experienced long stretches without goals throughout the season including ones as long as 14 games. He began to see his production pick up once he was paired with Silfverberg in March. In their first 12 games together, Silfverberg and Rakell combined for 12 goals and 25 points. Rakell tallied 17 points over his final 17 games and ended the regular season with 18 goals and 43 points.

Upon returning to the Ducks for the 2019–20 season, Rakell was reunited with Silfverberg and teammate Adam Henrique on an offensive line. Although Rakell proved to still be a productive player, he was unable to match the significant impact he had during previous seasons. He began the season strong, maintaining a five-game point streak through 22 October 2019. By 2 November, Rakell had collected two goals and six assists for eight points and a plus-10 rating over 11 games. Later that month, he played in his 400th career NHL game during a loss to the Oilers on 11 November. Following a 4–1 loss to the Philadelphia Flyers on 17 December, Rakell moved into ninth on the franchise's all-time power-play goals list with 27. Although he would miss six games with a sprained wrist, Rakell returned to the lineup on 7 January 2020, ranked third on the Ducks in goals, points, and assists. However, he soon experienced a 15-game goalless drought before being reunited with Silfverberg and Henrique. Upon reuniting, Rakell tallied one goal and four assists over three consecutive games. When the NHL paused play due to the COVID-19 pandemic, Rakell had tallied 15 goals and 27 assists for 42 points while also recording a team-leading 186 shots on goal and 81 hits through 65 games.

Rakell returned for the shortened 2020–21 season on the cusp of various milestones, including his 500th career NHL game. He began the season on the Ducks' top line alongside Getzlaf and rookie Sonny Milano, although they only combined for one point through the first four games. The Ducks continued to lack scoring as the season continued, and by 17 February 2021, Rakell and Max Comtois were the only skaters who had scored at least seven points. Although he would then experience a scoring drought that was snapped on 27 February, Rakell still led the team with 61 shots on goal. On 8 March, Rakell recorded his second straight three-point game and his first multi-goal contest of the season. He became the fourth Ducks player since 2009–10 to post consecutive games with three or more points and the eighth player in franchise history to record three points in consecutive games. He continued to find success in March and experienced a six-game point streak with five goals and seven assists. Although he missed four games in April with an upper-body injury, Rakell continued to put up points and became the second Duck to tally 20 points on the season. By 16 April, he had accumulated eight goals and 15 assists for 23 points. Rakell finished the season tied with Trevor Zegras for second on the team with 0.54 points per game.

Rakell returned to the Ducks for the 2021–22 season and was reunited with Zegras and Adam Henrique. He appeared in his 500th career NHL game when he made his season debut against the Winnipeg Jets on 13 October 2021. Rakell quickly led the Ducks with four goals in six games while also leading with 24 shots on goal and averaging 19:02 of ice time. However, he suffered an upper-body injury in a 4–3 overtime loss to the Buffalo Sabres at the end of October and was subsequently placed on injured reserve. Rakell missed 10 games to recover from the upper-body injury and he scored in his return to the lineup on 22 November.

==== Pittsburgh Penguins ====
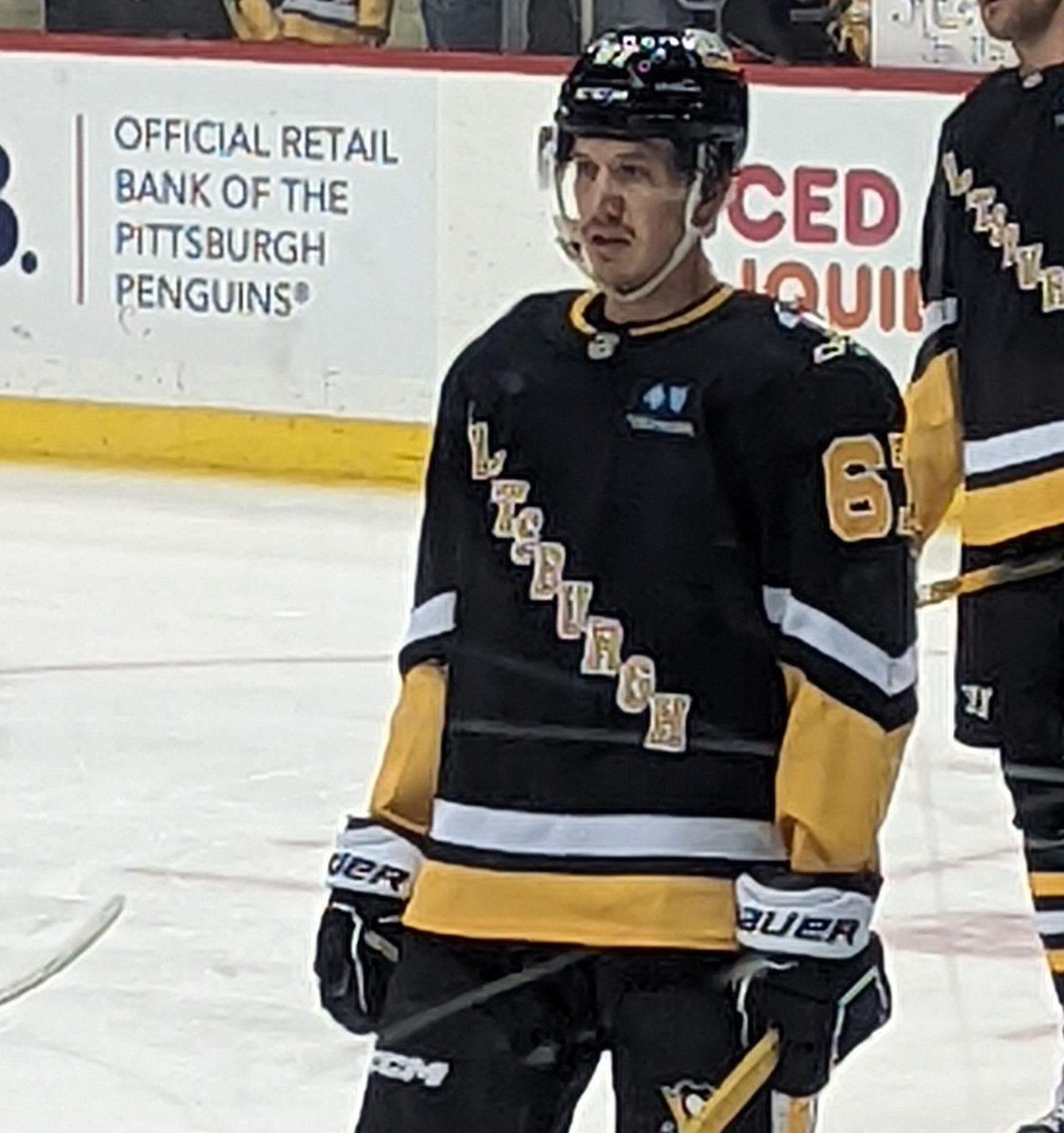
Rakell with the Penguins in 2023

On 21 March 2022, with Anaheim out of a playoff spot and with Rakell set to become an unrestricted free agent, the Ducks traded Rakell to the Pittsburgh Penguins in exchange for a 2022 second-round pick, Dominik Simon, Zach Aston-Reese, and Calle Clang. Upon joining the Penguins, Rakell moved in with fellow Swede Marcus Pettersson until his wife could join him in Pittsburgh. He made his debut with the team on 22 March, in a 5–1 win over the Columbus Blue Jackets. Rakell played 14:08 minutes of ice time on 17 shifts while playing mostly on the team's third line. The Penguins experimented with Rakell on various lines, including a short try out on their top line with Sidney Crosby and Jake Guentzel. The trio's Corsi showed that they combined for 58.46 five-on-five and generated 75 shot attempts per 60 minutes. However, he spent the majority of the season on their second line alongside Evgeni Malkin. In his first 13 games with the Penguins, most of which were spent alongside Malkin, Rakell scored three goals and seven assists for 10 points. He finished the season with four goals and nine assists for 13 points through 19 regular-season games with the Penguins. As the Penguins met with the New York Rangers in the first round, Rakell played one period of game 1 before leaving the game with an injury. He missed the following five games before being cleared to play for game 7 against Rangers. He recorded four shots on goal and one hit as the Rangers eliminated the Penguins from the playoffs.

During the 2022 off-season, Rakell signed a six-year, $30 million contract extension with the Penguins. General manager Ron Hextall praised Rakell for being a versatile and offensively impactful player for the team. He returned to the Penguins as a right winger on their first line beside Crosby and Guentzel. However, he was moved between the first and second lines as the 2022–23 season progressed and alternated between winger and centre positions. Despite the lack of stability, Rakell had accumulated 18 goals and 15 assists for 33 points through 49 games by the start of February 2023. He continued to improve during February and amassed seven points through four games. He subsequently earned praise from head coach Mike Sullivan who said that "He [Rakell] brings a skill element to that line [with Crosby and Guentzel] and an ability to create something out of nothing because of his talent level." Following a 10-game goalless drought through late February and early March, Sullivan moved Rakell into a third line with Drew O'Connor and Mikael Granlund. In their first few games together, the Penguins generated twice as many high-danger scoring chances as their opponents when the trio played 20 minutes together.

== International play ==
Medal record

Men's ice hockey

Representing Sweden

World Championships
Gold medal – first place	2018 Denmark	

World Junior Championships
Gold medal – first place	2012 Calgary	
Silver medal – second place	2013 Ufa	

As a native of Sweden, Rakell has represented his home country at both the junior and senior levels. He made his debut for Sweden junuor team at the 2011 World Junior Championships. As the youngest member of Sweden, he helped them finish fourth in the tournament. He then played in the 2012 World Junior Championships, where he recorded two goals and three assists en route to a gold medal. Rakell represented Sweden at the junior level for the final time at the 2013 World Junior Championships, where he helped them win a silver medal.

Rakell made his senior team debut at the 2018 World Championship, where he led Team Sweden to a gold medal. He accumulated six goals, including two game-winners, and eight assists for 14 points through 10 games. As a result of his outstanding play, Rakell was named to the tournament's All-Star Team.

On 4 February 2025, Rakell was selected to replace William Karlsson on Sweden's roster for the 4 Nations Face-Off.

On 2 Jan 2026, Rakell was named to his first Swedish Olympic roster, at the Milano Cortina 2026 games.

== Personal life ==
While playing for the Ducks, Rakell and his then-fiancé Emmeli created a charitable program called 67 Assists, referencing Rakell's jersey number. The purpose of the charity was to provide opportunities for training service dogs in a live sporting event environment.

Rakell and Emmeli married in August 2021, and their daughter was born in June 2022. Their son was born in April 2025.

== Career statistics ==
=== Regular season and playoffs ===
			Regular season					Playoffs
Season	Team	League	GP	G	A	Pts	PIM	GP	G	A	Pts	PIM
2009–10	AIK	J18	18	12	4	16	8	—	—	—	—	—
2009–10	AIK	J18 Allsv	12	13	12	25	10	3	2	2	4	0
2009–10	AIK	J20	8	3	1	4	2	2	1	0	1	0
2010–11	Plymouth Whalers	OHL	49	20	25	45	12	1	0	0	0	0
2011–12	Plymouth Whalers	OHL	60	28	34	62	12	13	2	10	12	0
2012–13	Plymouth Whalers	OHL	40	21	23	44	12	15	6	9	15	10
2012–13	Anaheim Ducks	NHL	4	0	0	0	0	—	—	—	—	—
2013–14	Norfolk Admirals	AHL	46	14	23	37	12	1	0	1	1	0
2013–14	Anaheim Ducks	NHL	18	0	4	4	2	4	1	1	2	0
2014–15	Anaheim Ducks	NHL	71	9	22	31	10	16	1	0	1	2
2014–15	Norfolk Admirals	AHL	2	1	3	4	0	—	—	—	—	—
2015–16	Anaheim Ducks	NHL	72	20	23	43	19	7	1	1	2	0
2016–17	Anaheim Ducks	NHL	71	33	18	51	12	15	7	6	13	0
2017–18	Anaheim Ducks	NHL	77	34	35	69	14	4	1	0	1	0
2018–19	Anaheim Ducks	NHL	69	18	25	43	27	—	—	—	—	—
2019–20	Anaheim Ducks	NHL	65	15	27	42	12	—	—	—	—	—
2020–21	Anaheim Ducks	NHL	52	9	19	28	12	—	—	—	—	—
2021–22	Anaheim Ducks	NHL	51	16	12	28	8	—	—	—	—	—
2021–22	Pittsburgh Penguins	NHL	19	4	9	13	4	2	0	0	0	0
2022–23	Pittsburgh Penguins	NHL	82	28	32	60	16	—	—	—	—	—
2023–24	Pittsburgh Penguins	NHL	70	15	22	37	22	—	—	—	—	—
2024–25	Pittsburgh Penguins	NHL	81	35	35	70	14	—	—	—	—	—
2025–26	Pittsburgh Penguins	NHL	60	24	24	48	8	6	1	3	4	0
NHL totals			862	260	307	567	180	54	12	11	23	2

=== International ===
Year	Team	Event	Result	GP	G	A	Pts	PIM
2010	Sweden	U17	3rd place, bronze medalist(s)	6	1	1	2	2
2010	Sweden	IH18	3rd place, bronze medalist(s)	5	0	2	2	4
2011	Sweden	WJC	4th	5	0	3	3	2
2012	Sweden	WJC	1st place, gold medalist(s)	6	2	3	5	4
2013	Sweden	WJC	2nd place, silver medalist(s)	6	0	6	6	16
2018	Sweden	WC	1st place, gold medalist(s)	10	6	8	14	6
2021	Sweden	WC	9th	7	1	1	2	0
2025	Sweden	4NF	3rd	2	0	0	0	2
2026	Sweden	OG	7th	5	0	1	1	0
Junior totals				28	3	15	18	28
Senior totals				24	7	10	17	8

== Awards and honours ==
Award	Year	Ref
NHL
NHL All-Star Game	2018	
International
WC All-Star Team	2018	

Awards and achievements
Preceded by Emerson Etem	Anaheim Ducks first-round draft pick 2011	Succeeded by Hampus Lindholm
