= Marcel Barouh =

French table tennis player (1934–2025)

- Born: 16 January 1934; Paris, France
- Died: 7 January 2025 (aged 90)
- Occupation: Table tennis player

Marcel Barouh (16 January 1934 – 7 January 2025) was a French table tennis player. He won multiple French Table Tennis Championships between 1958 and 1962. He was a participant in the 1959 World Table Tennis Championships.
