= Åke Rakell =

Swedish table tennis player (1935–2012)

Personal information
- Nationality: Sweden
- Born: 10 March 1935
- Died: 29 December 2012 (aged 77)
Medal record
Representing Sweden
World Table Tennis Championships
Bronze medal – third place	1959	doubles

Åke Gunnar Rakell (March 10, 1935 – November 29, 2012) was a Swedish international table tennis player.

== Table tennis career ==
He won a bronze medal in doubles with Hans Alsér at the a 1959 World Table Tennis Championships.

== Personal life ==
His grandson is Rickard Rakell, an ice hockey player in the National Hockey League. Rakell died on November 29, 2012, at the age of 77.

== See also ==
- List of table tennis players
- List of World Table Tennis Championships medalists
