= Eva Poor =

Hungarian table tennis player

Personal information
- Nationality: Hungary
Medal record
Representing Hungary
World Table Tennis Championships
Bronze medal – third place	1963	Women's team

Eva Poor is a female Hungarian former international table tennis player.

== Table tennis career ==
She won a bronze medal at the 1963 World Table Tennis Championships, in the Corbillon Cup (women's team event) for Hungary with Éva Kóczián, Erzsebet Heirits and Sarolta Lukacs.

== See also ==
- List of World Table Tennis Championships medalists
