= Goro Shibutani =

Japanese table tennis player (1937–2020)

Personal information
- Nationality: Japan
- Born: 30 September 1937
- Died: 25 October 2020 (aged 83)
Medal record
Representing Japan
World Table Tennis Championships
Silver medal – second place	1959	team

Goro Shibutani (渋谷 五郎, Shibutani Gorō; 30 September 1937 – 25 October 2020) was a Japanese international table tennis player.

== Table tennis career ==
He won a silver medal in the Swaythling Cup (men's team event) at the a 1961 World Table Tennis Championships.

== Personal life ==
His son is Hiroshi Shibutani and they became the first father and son to win the All-Japan Singles title.

Shibutani died on 25 October 2020 at the age of 83.

== See also ==
- List of table tennis players
- List of World Table Tennis Championships medalists
