= Hong Kong at the 1958 Asian Games =

- IOC code: HKG
- NOC: Sports Federation and Olympic Committee of Hong Kong, China

in Tokyo
- Medals Ranked 13th: Gold 0 Silver 1 Bronze 1 Total 2

Asian Games appearances (overview)
- 1954; 1958; 1962; 1966; 1970; 1974; 1978; 1982; 1986; 1990; 1994; 1998; 2002; 2006; 2010; 2014; 2018; 2022; 2026

Hong Kong participated in the 1958 Asian Games held in Tokyo, Japan from May 24 to June 1, 1958. The country ranked 13th with a silver and bronze medal.

== Medalists ==
Medal	Name	Sport	Event
Silver	Baguio Wong; Ng Yuk Chun	Table tennis	Women's doubles
Bronze	Henry Souza	Shooting	Men's 50 m rifle prone

== Medal summary ==
=== Medal table ===
Sport	Gold	Silver	Bronze	Total
Table tennis	0	1	0	1
Shooting	0	0	1	1
Totals (2 entries)	0	1	1	2
