= Lee Chong-hi =

South Korean table tennis player

Lee Chong-Hi
Personal information
- Nationality: South Korea
Medal record
Representing South Korea
World Championships
Silver medal – second place	1959	Women's Team

Lee Chong-Hi is a female former international table tennis player from South Korea.

== Table tennis career ==
She won a silver medal at the 1959 World Table Tennis Championships, in the Corbillon Cup (women's team event) for South Korea with Cho Kyung-Cha, Choi Kyung-ja and Hwang Yool-ja. She also made the women's doubles quarter final during the same championships.

== See also ==
- List of World Table Tennis Championships medalists
