= Ye Peiqiong =

Chinese table tennis player

Ye Peiqiong (Yei Pei-chun)
Personal information
- Nationality: China
- Born: 1937 (age 88–89)
Medal record
Women's table tennis
Representing China
Bronze medal – third place	1957	Women's Team
Bronze medal – third place	1959	Women's Team

Ye Peiqiong (Chinese: 叶佩琼; born 1937), also known as Yei Pei-chun, is a female former international table tennis player from China.

== Table tennis career ==
She won two bronze medals at the 1957 World Table Tennis Championships and the 1959 World Table Tennis Championships in the Corbillon Cup (women's team event) for China.

She also won a national title in 1959.

== See also ==
- List of table tennis players
- List of World Table Tennis Championships medalists
