= Maria Catrinel Folea =

Romanian table tennis player

Personal information
- Nationality: Romania
Medal record
Representing Romania
World Championships
Bronze medal – third place	1961	Women's Team

Maria Catrinel Folea is a former international table tennis player from Romania.

== Table tennis career ==
She won a bronze medal at the 1961 World Table Tennis Championships, in the Corbillon Cup (women's team event) for Romania with Maria Alexandru and Georgita Pitica.

== See also ==
- List of World Table Tennis Championships medalists
