= Hu Keming =

Chinese table tennis player

Hu Keming (Hu Ko-ming)
Personal information
- Nationality: China
- Born: 1940 (age 85–86)
Medal record
Representing China
World Table Tennis Championships
Silver medal – second place	1961	Women's Team
Bronze medal – third place	1961	Women's Doubles

Hu Keming (Chinese: 胡克明, born 1940), also known as Hu Ko-ming, is a female Chinese former international table tennis player.

== Table tennis career ==
She won a bronze medal at the 1961 World Table Tennis Championships in the women's doubles with Wang Jian and a silver medal in the Corbillon Cup (women's team) for China.

== See also ==
- List of table tennis players
- List of World Table Tennis Championships medalists
