= Rong Guotuan =

Chinese table tennis player

Rong Guotuan Jung Kuo-t'uan
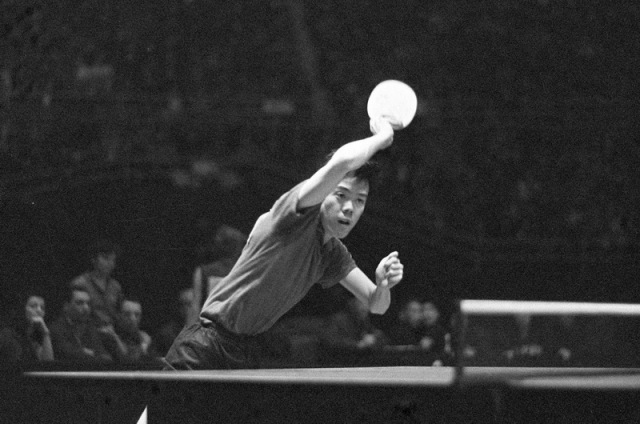
- Rong in 1959

Personal information
- Native name: 容国团
- Nationality: British Hong Kong (before 1957); China (after 1957)
- Born: Yung Kwok-tuen; 10 August 1937 Shau Kei Wan, British Hong Kong
- Died: 20 June 1968 (aged 30) Beijing, China

Sport
- Sport: Table tennis
Medal record
Men's table tennis
Representing China
World Championships
Gold medal – first place	1961 Beijing	Team
Gold medal – first place	1959 Dortmund	Singles
Bronze medal – third place	1959 Dortmund	Team

Rong Guotuan
- Traditional Chinese: 容國團
- Simplified Chinese: 容国团
Transcriptions
Standard Mandarin
- Hanyu Pinyin: Róng Guótuán
- Wade–Giles: Jung Kuo-t'uan
Yue: Cantonese
- Jyutping: jung^{4} gwok^{3} tyun^{4}

Rong Guotuan (Chinese: 容国团; Wade–Giles: Jung Kuo-t'uan; August 10, 1937 – June 20, 1968) was a Chinese table tennis player. He won the men's singles title at the 1959 World Table Tennis Championships in Dortmund, the first world championship winner representing the People's Republic of China. During the Cultural Revolution, Rong was persecuted as a "spy suspect". He committed suicide on June 20, 1968.

== Early years ==
Rong Guotuan was born in British Hong Kong in 1937, with family roots from Zhuhai, Guangdong Province, China. He started playing table tennis in his childhood and participated in competitions in Hong Kong as a junior. In 1957, Rong decided to move to China. He won national champion in the following year and was later selected as a member of the national team.

== Playing career ==
Rong's participation in the World Table Tennis Championships began in Dortmund, 1959. Chinese men's team faced Hungary at the semifinals of the team competition. Rong lost to Zoltán Berczik, the 1958 European champion, in three games. He defeated Laszlo Foldy but lost to the 1953 World Championships winner Ferenc Sidó at the eighth team match. The Chinese team was defeated by Hungary, 3–5.

In men's singles competition, Rong recorded seven straight wins (including defeated Berczik in quarter-final and Sidó in final) to clinch the men's world championship. He became the first world championship winner after the foundation of the People's Republic of China (PRC), having been recruited to the PRC by Chen Yi and He Long. The first table tennis ball Double Happiness (DHS, Chinese: 红双喜) made in China for international competitions was named after Rong's victory at the Championships and the tenth anniversary of the PRC's establishment in 1959.

At the 1961 World Table Tennis Championships in Beijing, Rong helped Chinese men's team win the first team title by defeating Japan and Hungary in the finals. After 1964, he worked as the coach of Chinese women's team. The women's team won their first champion at the 1965 World Championships.

== Cultural Revolution and suicide ==
The Cultural Revolution initiated in 1966 caused professional sportsmen to be denounced as "sprouts of revisionism" and the Chinese team were absent from the 1967 World Championships. Rong Guotuan and other members of the national team, Fu Qifang and Jiang Yongning, were placed under house arrest by Red Guards. They were each condemned on trumped-up charges of spying and subjected to torture and public humiliation. Fu and Jiang killed themselves after sustained periods of detention and torture in 1968. Rong also killed himself. His suicide note read, "I am not a spy; please do not suspect me. I have let you down. I treasure my reputation more than my life."

In 1978, the State Physical Culture and Sports Commission rehabilitated Rong Guotuan's honor. In 1987, a bronze statue of Rong was built in his ancestral home, Zhuhai.

== See also ==
- List of table tennis players
