= Han Yuzhen =

Chinese table tennis player

Han Yuzhen (Han Yu-chen)
Personal information
- Nationality: China
- Born: 1942
- Died: 1979 (aged 36–37)
Medal record
Representing China
World Table Tennis Championships
Silver medal – second place	1961	mixed doubles
Silver medal – second place	1961	women's team
Bronze medal – third place	1961	women's doubles

Han Yuzhen (Chinese: 韩玉珍; 1942–1979), also romanized as Han Yu-chen, was a female Chinese former international table tennis player.

== Table tennis career ==
She won three medals at the 1961 World Table Tennis Championships; two silver medals in the women's team and mixed doubles with Li Furong and a bronze medal in the women's doubles with Liang Lizhen.

== See also ==
- List of table tennis players
- List of World Table Tennis Championships medalists
