= Lau Wai Lim =

Hong Kong table tennis player

Personal information
- Full name: Lau Wai Lim
- Nationality: Hong Kong

Sport
- Sport: Table tennis

Lau Wai Lim is a former international table tennis player from Hong Kong.

== Table tennis career ==
In 1954 she won two gold medals in women's doubles and women's team events in the Asian Table Tennis Championships.

She also competed in the World Table Tennis Championships.
