= Wang Jian (table tennis) =

Chinese table tennis player

Wang Jian (Wang Chien)
Personal information
- Nationality: China
Medal record
Representing China
World Table Tennis Championships
| Bronze medal – third place | 1961 | Women's Singles |
| Bronze medal – third place | 1961 | Women's Doubles |
| Bronze medal – third place | 1963 | Women's Doubles |
| Bronze medal – third place | 1963 | Women's Team |

Wang Jian (Chinese: 王健), also known as Wang Chien, is a female Chinese former international table tennis player.

== Table tennis career ==
She won two bronze medals at the 1961 World Table Tennis Championships in the women's doubles with Hu Keming and women's singles. Two years later she won two more bronze medals at the 1963 World Table Tennis Championships in the Corbillon Cup (women's team) and women's doubles with Qiu Zhonghui.

== See also ==
- List of table tennis players
- List of World Table Tennis Championships medalists
