= Chiang Tsai-yun =

Taiwanese table tennis player

Personal information
- Nationality: Taiwan
- Born: 1934 (age 91–92)

Sport
- Sport: Table tennis
Medal record
Women's table tennis
Representing Republic of China
Asian Championships
Gold medal – first place	1957 Manila	Doubles
Gold medal – first place	1957 Manila	Women's Team

Chiang Tsai-yun (Chinese: 江彩雲; pinyin: Jiāng Cǎiyún; born 1934) is a former table tennis player from Taiwan. She won two gold medals in women's doubles and women's team events in the Asian Table Tennis Championships in 1957.
