= Chen Pao-pei =

Taiwanese table tennis player

Personal information
- Full name: Chen Pao-pei
- Nationality: Republic of China
- Born: 1934
- Died: 23 December 1975 (aged 40–41)

Sport
- Sport: Table tennis
Medal record
Women's table tennis
Representing Taiwan
Asian Championships
Gold medal – first place	1957 Manila	Doubles
Gold medal – first place	1957 Manila	Women's Team
Gold medal – first place	1953 Tokyo	Singles
Silver medal – second place	1953 Tokyo	Women's Team

Chen Pao-pei (Chinese: 陳寶貝; pinyin: Chén Bǎobèi) is a former table tennis player from Taiwan. She won several medals in singles, doubles, and team events in the Asian Table Tennis Championships in 1953 and 1957.
