= László Földy =

Hungarian table tennis player

Personal information
- Nationality: Hungary Switzerland
- Born: 30 September 1934
- Died: 17 February 2015 (aged 80)
- Height: 168 cm (5 ft 6 in)

Achievements and titles
- Highest world ranking: 9 (1960)
Medal record
Representing Hungary
World Table Tennis Championships
Bronze medal – third place	1953	Mixed doubles
Bronze medal – third place	1955	Men's team
Silver medal – second place	1957	Men's team
Silver medal – second place	1959	Men's team
Bronze medal – third place	1959	Men's doubles
Bronze medal – third place	1961	Men's team

László Földy (30 September 1934 in Budapest – 17 February 2015 in Basel) was a male former Hungarian and Swiss international table tennis player.

He won six World Table Tennis Championship medals from 1953 to 1961. This consisted of four medals in the team event, a bronze medal in the doubles with Zoltán Berczik and another bronze in the mixed doubles with Éva Kóczián.

In the early 1970s, Földy emigrated to Switzerland and since 1971, he represented this country on the international arena.

He married fellow Hungarian international and his mixed doubles partner Éva Kóczián.

== See also ==
- List of table tennis players
- List of World Table Tennis Championships medalists
