= Baguio Wong =

Hong Kong table tennis player

Baguio Wong Bik Yiu
Personal information
- Full name: BAO GUIO WONG Bik Yiu
- Nationality: Hong Kong

Sport
- Sport: Table tennis
Medal record
Women's table tennis
Representing Hong Kong
Asian Championships
Gold medal – first place	1956 Manila	Mixed Doubles
Gold medal – first place	1954 Singapore	Singles
Gold medal – first place	1954 Singapore	Doubles
Gold medal – first place	1954 Singapore	Women's Team
Silver medal – second place	1952 Singapore	Singles
Silver medal – second place	1952 Singapore	Doubles
Silver medal – second place	1952 Singapore	Mixed Doubles
Gold medal – first place	1952 Singapore	Women's Team

Baguio Wong Bik Yiu (Chinese: 黃碧瑤; Jyutping: wong^{4} bik^{1} jiu^{4}) is a former table tennis player from Hong Kong. From 1952 to 1956 she won several medals in singles, doubles, and team events in the Asian Table Tennis Championships.

== See also ==
- List of table tennis players
