= Georgeta Pitică =

Romanian table tennis player

Georgeta Pitică (Strugaru)
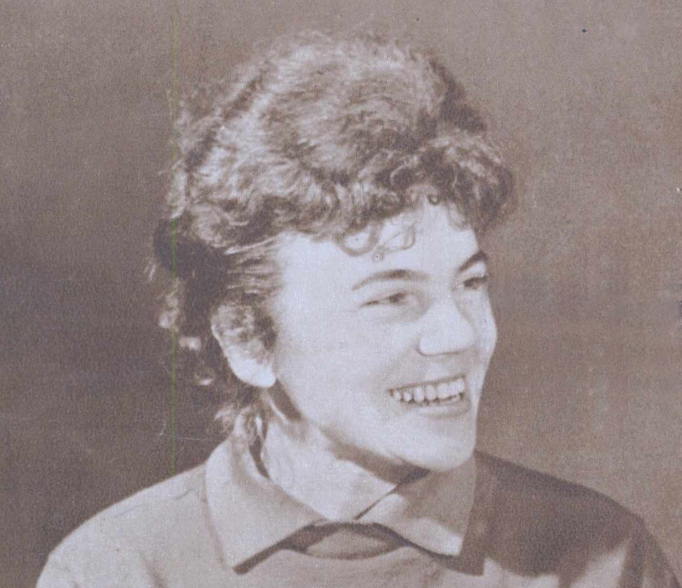
- Pitică in 1963

Personal information
- Nationality: Romania
- Born: 5 July 1930 Fetești
- Died: 13 October 2018 (age 88) Bucharest
Medal record
Representing Romania
World Table Tennis Championships
Gold medal – first place	1961	doubles
Bronze medal – third place	1961	team
Silver medal – second place	1963	team

Georgeta Pitică (married name Strugaru, 5 July 1930 – 13 October 2018), was a former Romanian international table tennis player.

== Table tennis career ==
She won three World Championship medals; a gold medal in the doubles with Maria Alexandru and a bronze medal at the 1961 World Table Tennis Championships followed by a silver medal in the team event at the 1963 World Table Tennis Championships.

== See also ==
- List of table tennis players
- List of World Table Tennis Championships medalists
