= Wang Chuanyao =

Chinese table tennis player (1931–2007)

Wang Chuanyao (Wang Chuan-Yao)
Personal information
- Nationality: China
- Born: March 1931 Yangzhou, Jiangsu, China
- Died: 19 November 2007 (aged 76) Beijing, China

Sport
- Sport: Table tennis
Medal record
Men's table tennis
Representing China
World Championships
Bronze medal – third place	1961 Beijing	Mixed
Gold medal – first place	1961 Beijing	Team
Bronze medal – third place	1959 Dortmund	Mixed
Bronze medal – third place	1959 Dortmund	Team
Bronze medal – third place	1957 Stockholm	Team
Bronze medal – third place	1956 Tokyo	Team

Wang Chuanyao (simplified Chinese: 王传耀; traditional Chinese: 王傳耀, March, 1931 – November 19, 2007) was a male table tennis player from China. From 1956 to 1961 he won several medals in singles, doubles, and team events in the World Table Tennis Championships.

== Major results ==
- Gold – team event at the 1961 World Table Tennis Championships.
- Bronze – team event at the 1956 World Table Table Tennis Championships.
- Bronze – team event at the 1957 World Table Tennis Championships.
- Bronze – team event at the 1959 World Table Tennis Championships.
- Bronze – mixed doubles event at the 1959 World Table Tennis Championships with Sun Meiying.
- Bronze – mixed doubles event at the 1961 World Table Tennis Championships with Sun Meiying.
