= Tomi Okawa =

Japanese table tennis player

Tomie Okawa
Personal information
- Full name: OKADA-OKAWA Tomi
- Nationality: Japan
- Born: 26 February 1932 (age 94)

Sport
- Sport: Table tennis
Medal record
Women's table tennis
Representing Japan
World Championships
Gold medal – first place	1961 Beijing	Team
Gold medal – first place	1957 Stockholm	Team
Gold medal – first place	1956 Tokyo	Singles
Bronze medal – third place	1956 Tokyo	Doubles
Bronze medal – third place	1956 Tokyo	Team

Tomi Okawa (born 26 February 1932) is a former international table tennis player from Japan.

== Career ==
From 1953 to 1961 Okawa won five medals in singles, doubles, and team events in the World Table Tennis Championships. The five World Championship medals included three gold medals in the singles at the 1956 World Table Tennis Championships and two in the team event at the 1957 World Table Tennis Championships and 1961 World Table Tennis Championships. Okawa also won an English Open title.

== See also ==
- List of table tennis players
- List of World Table Tennis Championships medalists
