= Nobuya Hoshino =

Japanese table tennis player (1937–2020)

Personal information
- Nationality: Japan
- Born: 1 February 1937 Osaka, Japan
- Died: 22 February 2020 (aged 83)

Sport
- Sport: Table tennis
Medal record
Men's table tennis
Representing Japan
World Championships
Gold medal – first place	1961 Beijing	Doubles
Bronze medal – third place	1961 Beijing	Mixed
Silver medal – second place	1961 Beijing	Team
Gold medal – first place	1959 Dortmund	Team

Nobuya Hoshino (星野 展弥, Hoshino Nobuya) (February 1, 1937 – February 22, 2020) was an international table tennis player from Japan.

== Table tennis career ==
From 1959 to 1961 he won several medals in singles, doubles, and team events in the World Table Tennis Championships and in the Asian Table Tennis Championships.

His four World Championship medals included two gold medals in the doubles with Koji Kimura at the 1961 World Table Tennis Championships and in the team event for Japan in 1959.

== See also ==
- List of table tennis players
- List of World Table Tennis Championships medalists
