= Cho Kyung-ja =

South Korean table tennis player (born 1940)

Personal information
- Nationality: South Korea
- Born: 29 July 1940 (age 85)
Medal record
Representing South Korea
World Championships
Silver medal – second place	1959	Women's Team

Cho Kyung-ja (born 29 July 1940) is a South Korean former international table tennis player.

== Table tennis career ==
Cho won a silver medal at the 1959 World Table Tennis Championships, in the Corbillon Cup (women's team event) for South Korea with Lee Chong-Hi, Choi Kyung-ja and Hwang Yool-ja.

She reached a world ranking of 10 in 1961.

== See also ==
- List of World Table Tennis Championships medalists
