= Teruo Murakami =

Japanese table tennis player

Personal information
- Full name: Teruo Murakami
- Nationality: Japan
- Born: 1938
- Died: 17 December 2013 (aged 74–75)

Sport
- Sport: Table tennis
Medal record
Men's table tennis
Representing Japan
World Championships
Silver medal – second place	1961 Beijing	Team
Gold medal – first place	1959 Dortmund	Doubles
Silver medal – second place	1959 Dortmund	Mixed
Gold medal – first place	1959 Dortmund	Team

Teruo Murakami (村上 輝夫, Murakami Teruo; 1938 – 17 December 2013) was an international table tennis player from Japan.

== Table tennis career ==
From 1959 to 1961, he won several medals in singles, doubles, and team events at both the World Table Tennis Championships and the Asian Table Tennis Championships.

His four World Championship medals included two gold medals in the doubles with Ichiro Ogimura at the 1959 World Table Tennis Championships and team event at the 1959 World Table Tennis Championships.

He also won two English Open titles.

== See also ==
- List of table tennis players
- List of World Table Tennis Championships medalists
