= Choi Kyung-ja =

South Korean table tennis player

Choi Kyung-Ja (Choi Kyong-ja)
Personal information
- Nationality: South Korea

Sport
- Sport: Table tennis
Medal record
Women's table tennis
Representing South Korea
World Championships
Silver medal – second place	1959 Dortmund	Team
Asian Championships
Gold medal – first place	1957 Manila	Singles
Silver medal – second place	1957 Manila	Team
Silver medal – second place	1960 Bombay	Doubles
Silver medal – second place	1960 Bombay	Team
Silver medal – second place	1964 Seoul	Team
Bronze medal – third place	1964 Seoul	Singles
Bronze medal – third place	1964 Seoul	Doubles
Asian Games
Silver medal – second place	1958 Tokyo	Team
Bronze medal – third place	1958 Tokyo	Doubles
Bronze medal – third place	1962 Jakarta	Team

Choi Kyung-Ja also Choi Kyong-ja is a former international table tennis player from South Korea.

== Table tennis career ==
From 1957 to 1964 she won several medals in singles, doubles, and team events in the Asian Table Tennis Championships. She also won a silver medal in the Corbillon Cup (women's team event) at the 1959 World Table Tennis Championships with Cho Kyung-Cha, Hwang Yool-ja and Lee Chong-Hi.

== See also ==
- List of table tennis players
- List of World Table Tennis Championships medalists
