= Sun Meiying =

Chinese table tennis player

Sun Meiying (Sun Mei-ying)
Personal information
- Nationality: China
- Born: 1931
- Died: 22 March 1993 (aged 61–62)
Medal record
Representing China
World Table Tennis Championships
Bronze medal – third place	1957	women's team
Bronze medal – third place	1959	women's doubles
Bronze medal – third place	1959	mixed doubles
Bronze medal – third place	1959	women's teams
Silver medal – second place	1961	women's doubles
Silver medal – second place	1961	women's team
Bronze medal – third place	1961	mixed doubles
Bronze medal – third place	1963	women's team
Bronze medal – third place	1963	women's singles

Sun Meiying (1931 – 22 March 1993), also known as Sun Mei-ying, was a female Chinese former international table tennis player.

== Table tennis career ==
She was a prolific medalist winning nine medals at the World Table Tennis Championships consisting of two silver medals and seven bronze medals.

Her doubles partners were Qiu Zhonghui (mixed) and Wang Chuanyao (women's).

== See also ==
- List of table tennis players
- List of World Table Tennis Championships medalists
