= Fujie Eguchi =

Japanese table tennis player (1932–2021)

Personal information
- Full name: Fujie Eguchi
- Nationality: Japan
- Born: 18 November 1932
- Died: 28 May 2021 (aged 88)

Sport
- Sport: Table tennis
Medal record
Women's table tennis
Representing Japan
World Championships
Silver medal – second place	1959 Dortmund	Singles
Silver medal – second place	1959 Dortmund	Doubles
Gold medal – first place	1959 Dortmund	Mixed Doubles
Gold medal – first place	1959 Dortmund	Team
Gold medal – first place	1957 Stockholm	Singles
Gold medal – first place	1957 Stockholm	Mixed Doubles
Gold medal – first place	1957 Stockholm	Team
Bronze medal – third place	1956 Tokyo	Singles
Silver medal – second place	1956 Tokyo	Doubles
Bronze medal – third place	1956 Tokyo	Team
Bronze medal – third place	1955 Utrecht	Doubles
Silver medal – second place	1955 Utrecht	Team
Bronze medal – third place	1954 Wembley	Singles
Bronze medal – third place	1954 Wembley	Doubles
Silver medal – second place	1954 Wembley	Mixed Doubles
Gold medal – first place	1954 Wembley	Team
Asian Championships
Silver medal – second place	1953 Tokyo	Doubles

Fujie Eguchi (江口 冨士枝, Eguchi Fujie; 18 November 1932 in Nagasaki – 28 May 2021) was an international table tennis player from Japan.

== Table tennis career ==
From 1954 to 1959 she won many medals in singles, doubles, and team events in the Asian Table Tennis Championships, and in the World Table Tennis Championships.

The sixteen World Championship medals included six gold medals; one in the singles at the 1957 World Table Tennis Championships, three in the team event and two in the mixed doubles with Ichiro Ogimura.

She also won three English Open titles.

== See also ==
- List of table tennis players
- List of World Table Tennis Championships medalists
