= Taeko Namba =

Japanese table tennis player

Personal information
- Full name: Taeko Namba
- Nationality: Japan
- Born: 1936 (age 89–90)

Sport
- Sport: Table tennis
Medal record
Women's table tennis
Representing Japan
World Championships
| Gold medal – first place | 1959 Dortmund | Doubles |
| Gold medal – first place | 1959 Dortmund | Team |
| Bronze medal – third place | 1957 Stockholm | Mixed |
| Gold medal – first place | 1957 Stockholm | Team |

Taeko Namba is a former international table tennis player from Japan.

== Table tennis career ==
From 1957 to 1959 she won several medals in doubles, and in team events in the World Table Tennis Championships.

The four World Championship medals included three gold medals; two in the team event and one in the doubles with Kazuko Yamaizumi.

She also won two English Open titles.

== See also ==
- List of table tennis players
- List of World Table Tennis Championships medalists
