= Zoltán Berczik =

Hungarian table tennis player

Personal information
- Full name: BERCZIK Zoltan
- Nationality: Hungary
- Born: 7 August 1937
- Died: 11 January 2011 (aged 73)

Sport
- Sport: Table tennis
Medal record
Men's table tennis
Representing Hungary
World Championships
Silver medal – second place	1961 Beijing	Doubles
Bronze medal – third place	1961 Beijing	Team
Bronze medal – third place	1959 Dortmund	Doubles
Bronze medal – third place	1959 Dortmund	Mixed Doubles
Silver medal – second place	1959 Dortmund	Team
Silver medal – second place	1957 Stockholm	Team
European Championships
Silver medal – second place	1964 Malmo	Singles
Bronze medal – third place	1964 Malmo	Doubles
Gold medal – first place	1960 Zagreb	Singles
Gold medal – first place	1960 Zagreb	Doubles
Gold medal – first place	1960 Zagreb	Team
Gold medal – first place	1958 Budapest	Singles
Gold medal – first place	1958 Budapest	Mixed Doubles
Gold medal – first place	1958 Budapest	Team

Zoltán Berczik (7 August 1937 – 11 January 2011) was a Hungarian table tennis player. In the late fifties he was ranked among the best European table tennis players and won, with his athletic play, the first two titles at the Table Tennis European Championships.

Berczik was born in Novi Sad. He began his career as a defensive player. With the advent of topspin in the late 1950s he turned his game around to attack. He died in Budapest.

== National success ==
He won the Hungarian championship in single continuously from 1959 to 1964. He won the double competition in 1959 with László Földy, in 1960 and 1961 with Ferenc Sido, in 1962 Miklós Péterfy, in 1963 with János Faházi and 1967 with István Jony. In mixed doubles he won in 1960 with Gizella Farkas and Éva Kóczián in 1967.

He won the team championships in 1957, 1958, 1959, 1962 and 1964 with the club Vasútépítő Törekvés and in 1965, 1966, 1967 and 1969 with Bp. Vasutas SC.

== World Championships ==
Berczik took part in World Championships five times: in 1957 he secured the silver medal with the Hungarian team. This happened again at the World Championship in 1959, where he also won the bronze medal in doubles with László Földy and mixed with Gizi Farkas. At the World Cup in 1961, he was third with the team and runner-up in doubles with Ferenc Sido. In 1963 and 1965 he won no medals.

== European Championships ==
At the Youth European Championship in 1955 in Stuttgart, he arrived in final in doubles, where he lost.

He achieved his greatest success at the European Championships in 1958 and 1960. Here he became European champion both in single and with the Hungarian team. In 1958 he won the Mixed with Gizi Farkas-Lantos, in 1960 the double competition with Ferenc Sidó. In 1964 he reached the final of the individual, which he lost to Kjell Johansson, and semi-finals in doubles.

== Trainer and author ==
From 1969 he served as coach for the Hungarian national team. After a stay in Japan in 1985, he coached Budapest Vasutas SC. In the 1990s he wrote a series of articles for coaches on the table tennis tactics:

- 1992: Tactics (2): establishment of tactics for a match
- 1992: Tactics (3): The tactics of the offensive player
- 1993: Tactics (5): Exercises for offensive players
- 1993: Tactics (6): Exercises for offensive players
- 1994: Tactics (7)
- 1994: Tactics (8)

Berczik ended his coaching career in 1996.

== See also ==
- List of table tennis players
- List of World Table Tennis Championships medalists
