= Kimiyo Matsuzaki =

Japanese table tennis player

Personal information
- Full name: MATSUZAKI Kimiyo
- Nationality: Japan
- Born: 18 June 1938 (age 88) Takase, Kagawa Prefecture

Sport
- Sport: Table tennis
Medal record
Women's table tennis
Representing Japan
World Championships
Gold medal – first place	1963 Prague	Singles
Gold medal – first place	1963 Prague	Doubles
Gold medal – first place	1963 Prague	Team
Bronze medal – third place	1961 Beijing	Singles
Gold medal – first place	1961 Beijing	Mixed Doubles
Gold medal – first place	1961 Beijing	Team
Gold medal – first place	1959 Dortmund	Singles
Silver medal – second place	1959 Dortmund	Doubles
Silver medal – second place	1959 Dortmund	Mixed Doubles
Gold medal – first place	1959 Dortmund	Team
Asian Championships
Gold medal – first place	1963 Manila	Singles
Gold medal – first place	1963 Manila	Doubles
Gold medal – first place	1963 Manila	Team
Gold medal – first place	1960 Bombay	Doubles
Gold medal – first place	1960 Bombay	Mixed Doubles
Gold medal – first place	1960 Bombay	Team

Kimiyo Matsuzaki (Japanese: 松崎キミ代, born June 18, 1938 in Takase, Kagawa Prefecture, Japan) is a former international table tennis player from Japan.

== Table tennis career ==
From 1959 to 1963 she won many medals in singles, doubles, and team events in the Asian Table Tennis Championships, and in the World Table Tennis Championships.

The ten World Championship medals included seven gold medals; two in the singles at the 1959 World Table Tennis Championships and 1963 World Table Tennis Championships, three in the team event and one in the doubles at the 1963 World Table Tennis Championships with Masako Seki.

== See also ==
- List of table tennis players
- List of World Table Tennis Championships medalists
