= Qiu Zhonghui =

Chinese table tennis player

Personal information
- Full name: QIU Zhonghui/CHIU Chung-Hui/丘钟惠
- Nationality: China
- Born: 22 December 1935 (age 90) Tengchong, Yunnan, China

Sport
- Sport: Table tennis
Medal record
Women's table tennis
Representing China
World Championships
Bronze medal – third place	1963 Prague	Doubles
Bronze medal – third place	1963 Prague	Mixed Doubles
Bronze medal – third place	1963 Prague	Team
Gold medal – first place	1961 Beijing	Singles
Silver medal – second place	1961 Beijing	Doubles
Silver medal – second place	1961 Beijing	Team
Bronze medal – third place	1959 Dortmund	Singles
Bronze medal – third place	1959 Dortmund	Doubles
Bronze medal – third place	1959 Dortmund	Team
Bronze medal – third place	1957 Stockholm	Team

Qiu Zhonghui also known as Chiu Chung-Hui is a former international table-tennis player from China and won China's first women's world title in the World Table Tennis Championships of 1961.

== Table tennis career ==
From 1956 to 1963 she won ten medals in singles, doubles, and team events in the World Table Tennis Championships.

The ten World Championship medals included a gold medal in the singles at the 1961 World Table Tennis Championships.

== See also ==
- List of table tennis players
- List of World Table Tennis Championships medalists
