= Kazuko Ito-Yamaizumi =

Japanese table tennis player (1935–2024)

Personal information
- Full name: ITO-YAMAIZUMI Kazuko
- Nationality: Japan
- Born: 17 January 1935 Osaka Prefecture, Japan
- Died: 27 August 2024 (aged 89)

Sport
- Sport: Table tennis
Medal record
Women's table tennis
Representing Japan
World Championships
Gold medal – first place	1959 Dortmund	Doubles
Gold medal – first place	1959 Dortmund	Team
Gold medal – first place	1961 Beijing	Team
Gold medal – first place	1963 Prague	Mixed Doubles
Gold medal – first place	1963 Prague	Team
Bronze medal – third place	1963 Prague	Doubles
Asian Championships
Gold medal – first place	1960 Bombay	Team
Gold medal – first place	1960 Bombay	Singles
Gold medal – first place	1960 Bombay	Doubles
Gold medal – first place	1963 Manila	Mixed Doubles
Gold medal – first place	1963 Manila	Team
Silver medal – second place	1960 Bombay	Mixed Doubles

Kazuko Ito-Yamaizumi (山泉 和子, Yamaizumi Kazuko; January 17, 1935 – August 27, 2024) was an international table tennis player from Japan.

== Table tennis career ==
From 1959 to 1963 Ito-Yamaizumi won several medals in singles, doubles, and team events in the World Table Tennis Championships and in the Asian Table Tennis Championships.

The six World Championship medals included five gold medals; one in the women's doubles with Taeko Namba in 1959, one in the mixed doubles with Koji Kimura in 1963 and three in the team event.

== Death ==
Ito-Yamaizumi died on August 27, 2024, at the age of 89.

== See also ==
- List of table tennis players
- List of World Table Tennis Championships medalists
