= English National Table Tennis Championships =

English table tennis competition

- Frequency: annual
- Country: England
- Inaugurated: 1959/60
- Organiser: Table Tennis England

The English National Table Tennis Championships are run by the English Table Tennis Association. The first championships were held in 1960. Lester Miles has won the most singles titles with 11, whilst the leading women are Jill Parker-Hammersley-Shirley and Tin-Tin Ho, each with seven singles titles.

== Senior Events ==
Season	Men's singles	Women's singles	Men's doubles	Women's doubles	Mixed doubles	Ref
1959/60	Bryan Merrett	Diane Rowe	Johnny Leach; Michael Thornhill	Jill Mills-Rook; Diane Rowe	Johnny Leach; Diane Rowe	
1960/61	Ian Harrison	Diane Rowe	Ian Harrison; Bryan Merrett	Elsie Carrington-Weaver; Jean McCree	Michael Maclaren; Margaret Piper	
1961/62	Robert Stevens	Diane Rowe	Bobbie Raybould; Robert Stevens	Jill Mills-Rook; Diane Rowe	Johnny Leach; Diane Rowe	
1962/63	Chester Barnes	Mary Wright-Shannon	Bobbie Raybould; Robert Stevens	Diane Rowe; Mary Wright-Shannon	Brian Wright; Mary Wright-Shannon	
1963/64	Chester Barnes	Diane Rowe	David Creamer; Johnny Leach	Diane Rowe; Mary Wright-Shannon	Ian Harrison; Diane Rowe	
1964/65	Chester Barnes	Mary Wright-Shannon	Chester Barnes; Ian Harrison	Diane Rowe; Mary Wright-Shannon	Chester Barnes; Diane Rowe	
1965/66	Denis Neale	Mary Wright-Shannon	Chester Barnes; Ian Harrison	Karenza Mathews-Smith; Mary Wright-Shannon	Brian Wright; Mary Wright-Shannon	
1966/67	Ian Harrison	Mary Wright-Shannon	Chester Barnes; Ian Harrison	Karenza Mathews-Smith; Mary Wright-Shannon	Stuart Gibbs; Mary Wright-Shannon	
1967/68	Denis Neale	Mary Wright-Shannon	Chester Barnes; Ian Harrison	Jackie Billington; Elsie Carrington-Weaver	Denis Neale; Karenza Mathews-Smith	
1968/69	Denis Neale	Judy Williams	Alan Hydes; Denis Neale	Judy Heaps; Pauline Piddock	Denis Neale; Karenza Mathews-Smith	
1969/70	Denis Neale	Mary Wright-Shannon	Alan Hydes; Denis Neale	Karenza Mathews-Smith; Mary Wright-Shannon	Denis Neale; Mary Wright-Shannon	
1970/71	Chester Barnes	Karenza Mathews-Smith	Chester Barnes; Trevor Taylor	Karenza Mathews-Smith; Jill Hammersley	Chester Barnes; Karenza Mathews-Smith	
1971/72	Trevor Taylor	Karenza Mathews-Smith	Alan Hydes; Denis Neale	Jill Hammersley; Karenza Mathews-Smith	Denis Neale; Karenza Mathews-Smith	
1972/73	Trevor Taylor	Jill Hammersley	Denis Neale; Trevor Taylor	Linda Jarvis-Howard; Karenza Mathews-Smith	Alan Hydes; Linda Jarvis-Howard	
1973/74	Chester Barnes	Jill Hammersley	Alan Hydes; Denis Neale	Linda Jarvis-Howard; Karenza Mathews-Smith	Denis Neale; Karenza Mathews-Smith	
1974/75	Denis Neale	Jill Hammersley	Andy Barden; Paul Day	Carole Knight; Karenza Mathews-Smith	Nicky Jarvis; Jill Hammersley	
1975/76	Desmond Douglas	Jill Hammersley	Desmond Douglas; Denis Neale	Jill Hammersley; Linda Jarvis-Howard	Desmond Douglas; Linda Jarvis-Howard	
1976/77	Denis Neale	Carole Knight	Desmond Douglas; Denis Neale	Jill Hammersley; Linda Jarvis-Howard	Paul Day; Melody Ludi	
1977/78	Paul Day	Jill Hammersley	Andy Barden; Paul Day	Jill Hammersley; Linda Jarvis-Howard	Nigel Eckersley; Karen Witt	
1978/79	Desmond Douglas	Jill Hammersley	Desmond Douglas; Jimmy Walker	Jill Hammersley; Linda Jarvis-Howard	Desmond Douglas; Linda Jarvis-Howard	
1979/80	Desmond Douglas	Carole Knight	Paul Day; Nicky Jarvis	Carole Knight; Anita Stevenson	John Hilton; Jill Hammersley	
1980/81	Desmond Douglas	Jill Hammersley	Desmond Douglas; Paul Day	Jill Hammersley; Linda Jarvis-Howard	Desmond Douglas; Linda Jarvis-Howard	
1981/82	Desmond Douglas	Carole Knight	Desmond Douglas; Paul Day	Carole Knight; Anita Stevenson	Desmond Douglas; Linda Jarvis-Howard	
1982/83	Desmond Douglas	Karen Witt	Desmond Douglas; Paul Day	Jill Hammersley; Karen Witt	Nigel Eckersley; Joy Grundy	
1983/84	Desmond Douglas	Alison Gordon	Desmond Douglas; Paul Day	Alison Gordon; Mandy Sainsbury	Sky Andrew; Carole Moore	
1984/85	Desmond Douglas	Lisa Lomas-Bellinger	Desmond Douglas; Carl Prean	Jackie Bellinger; Lisa Lomas-Bellinger	Graham Sandley; Alison Gordon	
1985/86	Desmond Douglas	Joy Grundy	Desmond Douglas; Carl Prean	Jill Hammersley; Joy Grundy	Sky Andrew; Fiona Elliot	
1986/87	Desmond Douglas	Fiona Elliot	Sky Andrew; Nicky Mason	Jackie Bellinger; Lisa Lomas-Bellinger	Sky Andrew; Fiona Elliot	
1987/88	Alan Cooke	Alison Gordon	Sky Andrew; Nicky Mason	Fiona Elliot; Lisa Lomas-Bellinger	Sky Andrew; Fiona Elliot	
1988/89	Alan Cooke	Lisa Lomas-Bellinger	Sky Andrew; Nicky Mason	Fiona Elliot; Lisa Lomas-Bellinger	John Holland; Jackie Billington	
1989/90	Desmond Douglas	Fiona Elliot	Alan Cooke; Desmond Douglas	Fiona Elliot; Lisa Lomas-Bellinger	Sky Andrew; Fiona Elliot	
1990/91	Carl Prean	Andrea Holt	Sky Andrew; Nicky Mason	Fiona Elliot; Lisa Lomas-Bellinger	Chen Xinhua; Nicola Deaton	
1991/92	Chen Xinhua	Alison Gordon	Alan Cooke; Desmond Douglas	Fiona Elliot; Lisa Lomas-Bellinger	Sky Andrew; Fiona Elliot	
1992/93	Carl Prean	Andrea Holt	Sky Andrew; Nicky Mason	Katy Goodall; Andrea Holt	Sky Andrew; Fiona Mommessin	
1993/94	Chen Xinhua	Lisa Lomas-Bellinger	Sky Andrew; Nicky Mason	Lisa Lomas-Bellinger; Fiona Mommessin	Sky Andrew; Fiona Mommessin	
1994/95	Carl Prean	Andrea Holt	Alan Cooke; Desmond Douglas	Katy Goodall; Andrea Holt	Damian Holland; Linda Radford	
1995/96	Alan Cooke	Alison Gordon	Alan Cooke; Desmond Douglas	Alison Gordon; Nicola Deaton	Alan Cooke; Nicola Deaton	
1996/97	Matthew Syed	Nicola Deaton	Alan Cooke; Desmond Douglas	Andrea Holt; Kubrat Owolabi	Alex Perry; Andrea Holt	
1997/98	Matthew Syed	Lisa Lomas-Bellinger	Alan Cooke; Desmond Douglas	Andrea Holt; Lisa Lomas-Bellinger	Alan Cooke; Nicola Deaton	
1998/99	Alex Perry	Nicola Deaton	Gareth Herbert; Alex Perry	Nicola Deaton; Helen Lower	Alex Perry; Nicola Deaton	
1999/00	Matthew Syed	Nicola Deaton	Gareth Herbert; Alex Perry	Nicola Deaton; Helen Lower	Alex Perry; Helen Lower	
2000/01	Matthew Syed	Nicola Deaton	Bradley Billington; Alan Cooke	Nicola Deaton; Helen Lower	Alan Cooke; Nicola Deaton	
2001/02	Andrew Baggaley	Nicola Deaton	Andrew Baggaley; Gareth Herbert	Nicola Deaton; Helen Lower	Alex Perry; Helen Lower	
2002/03	Alan Cooke	Andrea Holt	Alex Perry; Terry Young	Nicola Deaton; Kubrat Owolabi	Alex Perry; Helen Lower	
2003/04	Alan Cooke	Andrea Holt	Bradley Billington; Alan Cooke	Helen Lower; Georgina Walker	Alex Perry; Helen Lower	
2004/05	Alan Cooke	Helen Lower	Alex Perry; Terry Young	Natalie Bawden; Helen Lower	Alex Perry; Helen Lower	
2005/06	Alex Perry	Helen Lower	Alan Cooke; Paul Drinkhall	Helen Lower; Georgina Walker	Alex Perry; Helen Lower	
2006/07	Paul Drinkhall	Helen Lower	Paul Drinkhall; Darius Knight	Natalie Bawden; Helen Lower	Darius Knight; Kelly Sibley	
2007/08	Andrew Baggaley	Kelly Sibley	Paul Drinkhall; Darius Knight	Kelly Sibley; Joanna Parker	Paul Drinkhall; Joanna Parker	
2008/09	Paul Drinkhall	Joanna Parker	Paul Drinkhall; Darius Knight	Emily Bates; Mary Fuller	Paul Drinkhall; Joanna Parker	
2009/10	Andrew Baggaley	Joanna Parker	Gavin Evans; Liam Pitchford	Joanna Parker; Kelly Sibley	Paul Drinkhall; Joanna Parker	
2010/11	Paul Drinkhall	Kelly Sibley	Daniel Reed; Chris Doran	Joanna Parker; Kelly Sibley	Paul Drinkhall; Joanna Parker	
2011/12	Paul Drinkhall	Kelly Sibley	Daniel Reed; Darius Knight	Joanna Parker; Kelly Sibley	Darius Knight; Ajay Patel	
2012/13	Liam Pitchford	Kelly Sibley	Liam Pitchford; Paul Drinkhall	Joanna Parker; Kelly Sibley	Darius Knight; Kelly Sibley	
2013/14	Liam Pitchford	Joanna Parker	Liam Pitchford; Paul Drinkhall	Joanna Parker; Kelly Sibley	Sam Walker; Tin-Tin Ho	
2014/15	Liam Pitchford	Kelly Sibley	Liam Pitchford; Paul Drinkhall	Tin-Tin Ho; Maria Tsaptsinos	Sam Walker; Tin-Tin Ho	
2015/16	Paul Drinkhall	Tin-Tin Ho	Liam Pitchford; Paul Drinkhall	Tin-Tin Ho; Maria Tsaptsinos	Sam Walker; Tin-Tin Ho	
2016/17	Paul Drinkhall	Tin-Tin Ho	Liam Pitchford; Paul Drinkhall	Tin-Tin Ho; Maria Tsaptsinos	Paul Drinkhall; Joanna Drinkhall	
2017/18	Liam Pitchford	Tin-Tin Ho	Paul Drinkhall; David McBeath	Kelly Sibley; Maria Tsaptsinos	Liam Pitchford; Tin-Tin Ho	
2018/19	Liam Pitchford	Maria Tsaptsinos	Liam Pitchford; Paul Drinkhall	Tin-Tin Ho; Maria Tsaptsinos	Josh Bennett; Tin-Tin Ho	
2019/20	Liam Pitchford	Tin-Tin Ho	Liam Pitchford; Paul Drinkhall	Denise Payet; Emily Bolton	Sam Walker; Tin-Tin Ho	
2021/22	Tom Jarvis	Maria Tsaptsinos	Sam Walker; Tom Jarvis	Tin-Tin Ho; Maria Tsaptsinos	Sam Walker; Maria Tsaptsinos	
2022/23	Tom Jarvis	Tin-Tin Ho	Liam Pitchford; Paul Drinkhall	Tin-Tin Ho; Emily Bolton	Ismaila Akindiya; Mollie Patterson	
2023/24	Paul Drinkhall	Tin-Tin Ho	Sam Walker; Paul Drinkhall	Tin-Tin Ho; Emily Bolton	Sam Walker; Tin-Tin Ho	
2024/25	Liam Pitchford	Tin-Tin Ho	Paul Drinkhall; Sam Walker	Tianer Yu; Mari Baldwin	Connor Green; Anna Green	
2025/26	Tom Jarvis	Tin-Tin Ho	Tom Jarvis; Connor Green	Tin-Tin Ho; Sophie Earley	Sam Walker; Tin-Tin Ho	

== Under-21 Events ==
Season	Men's Under-21	Women's Under-21
1997/98	Darren Blake	Shelly Ruocco
1998/99	Ian Smith	Shelly Ruocco
1999/00	Andrew Baggaley	Georgina Walker
2000/01	Andrew Rushton	Louise Durrant
2001/02	Dale Barham	Amber Theobalds
2002/03	Dale Barham	Georgina Walker
2003/04	Andrew Rushton	Natalie Bawden
2004/05	Paul Drinkhall	Georgina Walker
2005/06	Darius Knight	Joanna Parker
2006/07	Darius Knight	Kelly Sibley
2007/08	Darius Knight	Kelly Sibley
2008/09	Paul Drinkhall	Emma Vickers
2009/10	Paul Drinkhall	Emma Vickers
2010/11	Liam Pitchford	Hannah Hicks
2011/12	Gavin Evans	Emma Vickers
2012/13	Sam Walker	Tin-Tin Ho
2013/14	Gavin Evans	Maria Tsaptsinos
2014/15	Sam Walker	Tin-Tin Ho
2015/16	Tom Jarvis	Maria Tsaptsinos
2016/17	Tom Jarvis	Tin-Tin Ho
2017/18	Helshan Weerasinghe	Tin-Tin Ho
2018/19	Tom Jarvis	Tin-Tin Ho
2019/20	Luke Savill	Denise Payet
2021/22	Shayan Siraj	Charlotte Bardsley
2022/23	Connor Green	Jasmin Wong
2023/24	Connor Green	Tianer Yu
2024/25	Larry Trumpauskas	Ella Pashley
2025/26	Isaac Kingham	Tianer Yu

== Multiple titles ==
No.	Name	Gender	Singles	Doubles	Mixed Doubles	Total
1	Desmond Douglas	Male	11	15	4	30
2	Paul Drinkhall	Male	7	15	5	27
3	Tin-Tin Ho	Female	8	8	8	24
4	Alan Cooke	Male	6	9	3	18
4	Denis Neale	Male	6	7	5	18
4	Jill Parker-Hammersley-Shirley	Female	7	9	2	18
7	Helen Lower	Female	3	8	6	17
8	Liam Pitchford	Male	7	9	1	17
8	Nicola Deaton	Female	5	6	5	16
8	Mary Wright-Shannon	Female	6	6	4	16
11	Karenza Mathews-Smith	Female	2	8	5	15
11	Kelly Sibley	Female	5	7	3	15
11	Fiona Elliot-Mommessin	Female	2	6	7	15
14	Lisa Lomas-Bellinger	Female	5	9	0	14
14	Joanna Parker	Female	3	6	5	14
14	Sky Andrew	Male	0	6	8	14
17	Alex Perry	Male	1	4	8	13
18	Chester Barnes	Male	5	5	2	12
18	Linda Jarvis-Howard	Female	0	7	5	12
20	Diane Rowe	Female	4	4	3	11
21	Sam Walker	Male	0	3	7	10
22	Andrea Holt	Female	4	4	1	9
22	Maria Tsaptsinos	Female	2	6	1	9
24	Ian Harrison	Male	2	5	1	8
25	Darius Knight	Male	0	4	3	7
26	Nicky Mason	Male	0	6	0	6
26	Carole Knight	Female	3	3	0	6
26	Alison Gordon	Female	3	2	1	6
29	Alan Hydes	Male	0	4	1	5
29	Carl Prean	Male	3	2	0	5
29	Trevor Taylor	Male	2	3	0	5
32	Tom Jarvis	Male	3	2	0	5
33	Johnny Leach	Male	0	2	2	4
33	Matthew Syed	Male	4	0	0	4
33	Andrew Baggaley	Male	3	1	0	4
36	Robert Stevens	Male	1	2	0	3
36	Karen Witt	Female	1	1	1	3
36	Gareth Herbert	Male	0	3	0	3
36	Chen Xinhua	Male	2	0	1	3
40	Bradley Billington	Male	0	2	0	2
40	Daniel Reed	Male	0	2	0	2
40	Bryan Merrett	Male	1	1	0	2
40	Joy Grundy	Female	1	0	1	2
40	Andy Barden	Male	0	2	0	2
40	Anita Stevenson	Female	0	2	0	2
40	Jackie Bellinger	Female	0	2	0	2
40	Elsie Carrington-Weaver	Female	0	2	0	2
40	Georgina Walker	Female	0	2	0	2
40	Nicky Jarvis	Male	0	1	1	2
40	Katy Goodall	Female	0	2	0	2
40	Kubrat Owolabi	Female	0	2	0	2
40	Natalie Bawden	Female	0	2	0	2
40	Bobbie Raybould	Male	0	2	0	2
40	Jackie Billington	Female	0	1	1	2
40	Connor Green	Male	0	1	1	2
40	Brian Wright	Male	0	0	2	2
40	Nigel Eckersley	Male	0	0	2	2
40	Jill Mills-Rook	Female	0	2	0	2
