= Table Tennis England =

Sports governing body

- Sport: Table Tennis
- Founded: 1927; 98 years ago
- Location: Milton Keynes
- Chairman: Clare Briegal
- CEO: Sally Lockyer
- (England)

Table Tennis England, formerly the English Table Tennis Association, is the national governing body for table tennis in England, responsible for representing, coordinating, administering, marketing and developing the sport. Most of its annual income comes from government grants and Sport England funding. Table Tennis England runs three separate national championships every year – for U10-U13 players; cadets and juniors; and seniors – as well as operating the British League, a Grand Prix series and other irregularly held tournaments, including the English Open.

== History ==
It was founded as the Table Tennis Association in 1921. The organisation was known as the English Table Tennis Association between 1927 and 2014 and has been affiliated to the ITTF (International Table Tennis Federation) since 1927. Table Tennis England is based at Milton Keynes, having moved from Hastings in March 2014. It rebranded as Table Tennis England in May 2014.

The organisation was scheduled to move into a purpose-built headquarters near the National Bowl, Milton Keynes, to be shared with Badminton England, but the project has now been shelved.

== Events/tournaments ==
- English National Championships
- British League
- Grand Prix Circuit
- English Open

== English major senior titles ==
=== Men's singles ===
Year	Player	Event	Location
2019	(England) Paul Drinkhall	ITTF World Tour – Serbia Open	Belgrade
2014	(England) Paul Drinkhall	ITTF World Tour – Spanish Open	Almeria
2001	(England) Matthew Syed	Commonwealth Championships	New Delhi
2000	(England) Matthew Syed	Commonwealth Championships	Singapore
1997	(England) Matthew Syed	Commonwealth Championships	Glasgow
1996	(England) Carl Prean	ITTF Pro Tour Brazil Open	Rio de Janeiro
1989	(England) Alan Cooke	Commonwealth Championships	Cardiff
1987	(England) Desmond Douglas	European Master Top 12	Basel
1985	(England) Desmond Douglas	Commonwealth Championships	Douglas
1984	(England) Desmond Douglas	English Open	
1980	(England) Desmond Douglas	English Open	
1980	(England) John Hilton	European Championship	Berne
1975	(England) Trevor Taylor	Commonwealth Championships	Melbourne
1973	(England) Trevor Taylor	Commonwealth Championships	Cardiff
1971	(England) Trevor Taylor	Commonwealth Championships	COMW
1960	(England) Ian Harrison	English Open	
1954	(England) Richard Bergmann	English Open	
1952	(England) Richard Bergmann	English Open	
1951	(England) Johnny Leach	World Championships	Vienna
1950	(England) Richard Bergmann	English Open	
1950	(England) Richard Bergmann	World Championships	Budapest
1949	(England) Johnny Leach	World Championships	Stockholm
1948	(England) Richard Bergmann	English Open	
1948	(England) Richard Bergmann	World Championships	Wembley
1939	(England) Richard Bergmann	World Championships	Cairo
1929	(England) Fred Perry	World Championships	Budapest
1924	(England) Percival Bromfield	English Open	
1923	(England) Mike Cohen	English Open	
1922	(England) Andrew Donaldson	English Open	

=== Women's singles ===
Year	Player	Player	Event	Location
	Winner	Runner-up		
1996		Lisa Lomas-Bellinger	ITTF Pro Tour Brazil Open	Rio de Janeiro
1992		Lisa Lomas-Bellinger	European Championships	Stuttgart
1985	Karen Witt		Commonwealth Championships	Douglas
1982	Carole Knight	Alison Gordon	Commonwealth Championships	Bombay
1982		Jill Hammersley	European Championships	Budapest
1982		Jill Hammersley	European Master Top 12	Nantes
1981	Jill Hammersley		European Master Top 12	Prague
1980	Jill Hammersley		European Master Top 12	Prague
1979		Carole Knight	Commonwealth Championships	Edinburgh
1978	Jill Hammersley		European Master Top 12	Prague
1978		Jill Hammersley	European Championships	Dulsburg
1977		Jill Hammersley	European Master Top 12	Sarajevo
1976	Jill Hammersley		European Championships	Prague
1975	Jill Hammersley	Linda Jarvis-Howard	Commonwealth Championships	Melbourne
1973	Jill Hammersley	Karenza Matthews-Smith	Commonwealth Championships	Cardiff
1971	Jill Hammersley	Karenza Matthews-Smith	Commonwealth Championships	COMW
1958		Ann Haydon	European Championships	Budapest
1957		Ann Haydon	World Championships	Stockholm
1948		Vera Thomas-Dace	World Championships	Wembley
1947		Elizabeth Blackbourn	World Championships	Paris

== Coaches ==
- Alan Cooke (Head Coach)
- Kelly Sibley
