= Bradley Billington =

British table tennis player

Personal information
- Nationality: England
- Born: 1970 (age 54–55)

Bradley Billington (born 1970) is a male former international table tennis player from England.

== Table tennis career ==
He represented England at the 1997 World Table Tennis Championships in the Swaythling Cup (men's team event) with Alan Cooke, Carl Prean, Matthew Syed and Alex Perry.

He also won two English National Table Tennis Championships titles.

== See also ==
- List of England players at the World Team Table Tennis Championships
