= Kubrat Owolabi =

Nigerian table tennis player

Personal information
- Nationality: Nigeria England
- Born: 21 January 1967 (age 58)

Kubrat Owolabi (born 21 January 1967) is a female former international table tennis player from Nigeria and England.

== Table tennis career ==
She represented England at the 2000 World Team Table Tennis Championships (Corbillon Cup women's team event) with Helen Lower and Linda Radford. She was formerly the 1988 African Table Tennis Championships singles champion, twice a doubles winner when representing Nigeria and the winner of gold in the mixed doubles while representing Nigeria at the 1987 All-Africa Games.

She was twice English national doubles champion with Andrea Holt and Nicola Deaton at the English National Table Tennis Championships. She also competed in the women's singles event at the 1988 Summer Olympics.

== See also ==
- List of England players at the World Team Table Tennis Championships
