= 1991 World Table Tennis Championships – Women's team =

1991 Corbillon Cup (women's team)

The 1991 World Table Tennis Championships – Corbillon Cup (women's team) was the 34th edition of the women's team championship.

The Unified Korean team won the gold medal defeating China in the final 3–2. France won the bronze medal.

== Medalists ==
Event	Gold	Silver	Bronze
	Korea; Hong Cha-ok; Hyun Jung-hwa; Li Bun-hui; Yu Sun-bok	China; Chen Zihe; Deng Yaping; Gao Jun; Qiao Hong	France; Emmanuelle Coubat; Sandrine Derrien; Xiaoming Wang-Dréchou; Agnès Le Lannic

== Final stage knockout phase ==
=== Last 16 ===
Team One	Team Two	Score
Unified Korean Team	Denmark	3–0
Czechoslovakia	Japan	3–2
Hungary	Germany	3–1
China	Finland	3–0
Hong Kong	New Zealand	3–0
Romania	Yugoslavia	3–2
France	England	3–1
Soviet Union	Sweden	3–2

=== Quarter finals ===
Team One	Team Two	Score
China	Czechoslovakia	3–0
Unified Korean Team	Soviet Union	3–0
France	Hong Kong	3–1
Hungary	Romania	3–1

=== Semifinals ===
Team One	Team Two	Score
Unified Korean Team	Hungary	3–1
China	France	3–0

=== Third-place playoff ===
Team One	Team Two	Score
France	Hungary	3–2

=== Final ===
Unified Korean Team 3		China 2	Score
Yu Sun-bok	bt	Deng Yaping	21–7 17–21 21–18
Hyun Jung-hwa	bt	Gao Jun	21–11 21–15
Hyun Jung-hwa & Li Bun-hui	lost to	Deng Yaping & Gao Jun	21–16 19–21 13–21
Hyun Jung-hwa	lost to	Deng Yaping	14–21 16–21
Yu Sun-bok	bt	Gao Jun	21–19 21–19

== See also ==
List of World Table Tennis Championships medalists
