= Judy Williams =

British table tennis player (1944–2024)

Personal information
- Nationality: British (English)
- Born: 25 February 1944 Colney Heath Hertfordshire, England
- Died: 16 August 2024 (aged 80) Amsterdam, Netherlands

Judith Yvonne Williams (25 February 1944 – 16 August 2024) was a British international table tennis player from England who also played in the Netherlands. She played in several World Table Tennis Championships and Veterans World Championships and won the English National Table Tennis Championships in 1969.

== Early life ==
Judy was born in Colney Heath near St Albans in Hertfordshire, England in 1944. Shortly after World War II her parents Bill and Marjorie bought and began running the Dagmar House Hotel in Hatfield, Hertfordshire. Her father built a pre-fabricated games room in the hotel garden which was just large enough to meet international table tennis standards, and it was there that Judy and her brother Peter, also later an international player, learned to play table tennis. Teams were formed at the hotel and allowed to play in the Welwyn Hatfield league, and Williams started playing junior matches for Hertfordshire at the age of 13. She went on to win the U15 national girls championship in 1959.

Judy attended St Albans Girls Grammar School and later went to Birmingham University, and whilst there she played county matches for Warwickshire.

== Table tennis career ==
Williams made her international debut for England in January 1960 and won the Sussex Championships nine times. In 1961 she won the junior girls doubles at the English Open. She played in her first world championships at the 1963 World Table Tennis Championships, and won the singles title at the Universities' Championship in 1964.

Williams represented England at the 1969 World Table Tennis Championships in the Corbillon Cup (women's team event) with Karenza Mathews, Jill Shirley and Mary Shannon-Wright.

She was also the 1969 English National Table Tennis Championships singles champion.

In 1988 she was runner up in the Over 40s women's singles and doubles events at the World Veterans Championships in Zagreb, and in 2001, won a bronze medal in the Over 50s European Veterans Championships in Denmark. Judy continued to play and coach table tennis at the Amsterdam 78 club well into her 70s.

== Personal life ==
Williams worked as a translator for Shell Oil and moved to Amsterdam in the mid-1970s. She married Kemal Çelik in 1981, but they divorced in 1999.

She died at the nursing home Eben Haezer, Wisseloord, Amsterdam.

== See also ==
- List of England players at the World Team Table Tennis Championships
