= Andy Barden =

British table tennis player

Personal information
- Full name: Andrew Alan John Barden
- Nickname: The Bat
- Nationality: England
- Citizenship: British
- Born: Andrew Barden Barnet, London
- Died: 2002 Tenerife
- Occupation: Director

Sport
- Sport: Table Tennis

Andrew Barden is a male former international table tennis player from England.

== Table tennis career ==
He represented England at the 1977 World Table Tennis Championships in the Swaythling Cup (men's team event) with Paul Day, Desmond Douglas and Denis Neale.

He won two English National Table Tennis Championships titles.

== See also ==
- List of England players at the World Team Table Tennis Championships
