= Anita Stevenson =

British table tennis player

Personal information
- Nationality: England

Anita Stevenson is a female former international table tennis player from England.

== Table tennis career ==
She represented England at the 1979 World Table Tennis Championships in the Corbillon Cup (women's team event) with Jill Hammersley, and Karen Witt.

She won a bronze medal at the European Table Tennis Championships and won two English National Table Tennis Championships in the doubles with Carole Knight. Her representative county was Leicestershire.

== See also ==
- List of England players at the World Team Table Tennis Championships
