= Katy Parker (table tennis) =

English table tennis player

Personal information
- Nationality: England
- Born: 1985; Preston, Lancashire, England

Katy Parker is a female former international table tennis player from England.

== Table tennis career ==
Parker represented England aged just 12 and in 2001 represented England at the 2001 World Team Table Tennis Championships (Corbillon Cup women's team event) with Helen Lower, Natalie Bawden and Louise Durrant. The following year she was selected by England for the 2002 Commonwealth Games in Manchester.

She became a coach in 2008.

== Personal life ==
She is the daughter of former international players Jill Hammersley and Donald Parker.

== See also ==
- List of England players at the World Team Table Tennis Championships
