= Fielder (surname) =

Fielder is a surname, and may refer to:

- Albert Fielder (1889–1947), English cricketer
- Alvin Fielder (1935–2019), American jazz drummer
- Angie Fielder, Australian film producer
- Arthur Fielder (1877–1949), English cricket fast bowler
- Aubrey Fielder (1929–2005), British cross-country skier
- Bruce Fielder (born 1992), English DJ, record producer, and remixer
- Cecil Fielder (born 1963), American professional baseball player
- Colin Fielder (born 1964), English footballer
- George Bragg Fielder (1842–1906), former congressman from New Jersey
- Goodman Fielder, food product distributor in Australia and New Zealand
- Guyle Fielder (1930–2026), American-born Canadian ice hockey player
- Harry Fielder (1940–2021), English actor
- Jackie Fielder, American politician
- James Fairman Fielder (1867–1954), American lawyer and Democratic governor of New Jersey
- Jennifer Fielder, politician
- Jim Fielder (born 1947), former bassist for Blood, Sweat, and Tears
- John Fielder (1950–2023), American landscape photographer and nature writer
- Joyce Fielder (born 1938), table tennis player from England
- Kendall J. Fielder (1893–1981), officer in the United States Army
- Mary Beth Fielder, American filmmaker
- Nathan Fielder (born 1983), Canadian writer, comedian, and film maker
- Pat Fielder (1929–2018), American screenwriter
- Prince Fielder (born 1984), major league baseball player
- Richard Fielder (1925–2020), American screenwriter
- Richard Fielder (1758–1826), English professional cricketer
- Ross Fielder (1926–1995), Australian rugby league footballer
- Walter Fielder (1899–1968), English cricketer

== See also ==
- Fielder (disambiguation)
