= Jimmy Walker (table tennis) =

English table tennis player

Personal information
- Nationality: England
- Born: 1953 (age 72–73) Middlesbrough, England

Achievements and titles
- Highest world ranking: 3 in England

Jimmy Walker is a male former international table tennis player from England. He started playing at Ormesby table tennis club and was a member of the European Club Championship winning team in 1972.

As a junior he reached the final of the English Junior Open beating the top seed Ingemar Vikstrom in the semi-final, only to lose in the final to Manfred Baum of Germany. He was also a member of the bronze medal winning team in the European Junior Championships in Ostend, Belgium in 1971. Career highlights:- Commonwealth Championships - Gold medal in team event in Melbourne, Australia 1975, Siver medal in team event Guernsey 1977, 1 gold and 3 silver medals in Scotland 1979 - gold in the mixed doubles and silver in the men's team event, men's singles and men's doubles Winner of men's singles Lisbon Open 1973 Twice winner of men's singles Scottish Open Winner of Irish Open men's singles 1979 and twice winner of Irish Open mixed doubles with his wife, Irish International Karen Walker (nee Senior)

== Table tennis career ==
He represented England at the 1975 World Table Tennis Championships in the Swaythling Cup (men's team event) with Desmond Douglas, Nicky Jarvis, Denis Neale and Trevor Taylor.

He won the English National Table Tennis Championships men's doubles title in 1979 with Desmond Douglas.

== Personal life ==
He married Karen Senior, a table tennis player formerly ranked number one in Ireland.

== See also ==
- List of England players at the World Team Table Tennis Championships
