= Stuart Gibbs (table tennis) =

English table tennis player

Personal information
- Nationality: England

Stuart Gibbs is a male former international table tennis player from England.

== Table tennis career ==
He represented England at the 1967 World Table Tennis Championships in the Swaythling Cup (men's team event) with Chester Barnes, Denis Neale and Ian Harrison.

He won an English National Table Tennis Championships mixed doubles title in 1967.

== See also ==
- List of England players at the World Team Table Tennis Championships
