= Nicky Mason =

British table tennis player

Personal information
- Nationality: England
- Born: 1965

Nicky Mason is a male former international table tennis player from England.

== Table tennis career ==
He represented England during the 1988 European Table Tennis Championships, where he won a silver medal in the team event. He was also six times National doubles champion partnering Sky Andrew from 1987-1994.

== See also ==
- List of England players at the World Team Table Tennis Championships
