= Pauline Piddock =

British table tennis player

Personal information
- Nationality: England
- Born: 1949
- Died: 19 June 2007

Suzanne Pauline Piddock (née Hemmings) was a female international table tennis player from England.

== Table tennis career ==
She represented England at the 1971 World Table Tennis Championships in the Corbillon Cup (women's team event) with Karenza Mathews and Jill Shirley.

She was also the 1969 English National Table Tennis Championships doubles champion and represented Hertfordshire and Kent at county level.

== Personal life ==
She married Kent county player and England ranked number ten Anthony Piddock in 1967. After marrying she switched allegiance from Hertfordshire to Kent.

== See also ==
- List of England players at the World Team Table Tennis Championships
