= Liu Jia-Yi =

Chinese table tennis player

Liu Jia-Yi (Chinese: 刘加诒) is the current English Men's senior table tennis coach. He is originally from China, where he was both a national team player and coach before moving to Dubai to work for the National Association. After this he moved to work for the ETTA (English Table Tennis Association) and coach in England. Liu Jia-Yi is very well respected around the world for his vast knowledge of the sport, and for coaching Paul Drinkhall from the age of 11 to number 3 in the world Under 18 rankings.
