= Andrew Rushton =

British table tennis player

Personal information
- Nationality: England
- Born: 18 June 1983 Walkden, England

Sport
- Sport: Table Tennis
Medal record
Commonwealth Games
Silver medal – second place	2006 Melbourne	Men's Doubles

Andrew Rushton is a male international table tennis player from England.

== Table tennis career ==
He represented England in the 2006 World Table Tennis Championships in the Swaythling Cup (men's team event) with Darius Knight, Paul Drinkhall and Andrew Baggaley.

He won three Under 21 national titles English National Table Tennis Championships in 2001 and 2003 and 2004.

== See also ==
- List of England players at the World Team Table Tennis Championships
