= Jessica Dawson =

English table tennis player

Personal information
- Nationality: England

Jessica Dawson is a female international table tennis player from England.

== Table tennis career ==
Dawson from Thornaby-on-Tees represented England at the 2012 World Team Table Tennis Championships (Corbillon Cup women's team event) with Joanna Parker Kelly Sibley and Hannah Hicks. The following year she was crowned National Junior champion.

== See also ==
- List of England players at the World Team Table Tennis Championships
