= Douggie Johnson =

British table tennis player

Personal information
- Nationality: England

Douggie Johnson is a male international table tennis player from England.

== Table tennis career ==
He represented England in the 1981 World Table Tennis Championships in the Swaythling Cup (men's team event) with Paul Day, Desmond Douglas and John Hilton.

== See also ==
- List of England players at the World Team Table Tennis Championships
