= Fielder =

Fielder may refer to:

== Sports ==
- Fielding (cricket), the action of fielders in collecting the ball after it is struck by the batsman
- Fielders, any of various baseball positions including:
  - Infielder, a player positioned near first, second or third base
  - Outfielder, a player positioned beyond the infield, including the left fielder, center fielder, and right fielder
- Lake County Fielders, baseball team based in Zion, Illinois

== Places ==
- Fielder Creek, a stream in the U.S. state of Oregon
- Fielder House, a historic house in Fordyce, Arkansas
- Fielder Mountain, a summit in the U.S. state of Oregon
- Fielder railway station, Melbourne
- Fielders Sports Ground, a cricket ground in Hornchurch, England
- Fielders Stadium, an unfinished baseball park in Zion, Illinois

== Names ==
- Fielder (surname)
- Fielder Cook (1923–2003), American television and film director, producer, and writer
- Fielder Jones (1871–1934), American center fielder and manager

== Other uses ==
- Toyota Fielder, a car model

== See also ==
- Fielder's choice, a baseball play
- Fielding (disambiguation)
