= Emma Vickers =

English table tennis player (born 1991)

Personal information
- Nationality: England
- Born: 6 February 1991 (age 34)

Emma Vickers is a female international table tennis player from England.

== Table tennis career ==
She represented England at the 2008 World Table Tennis Championships in the Corbillon Cup (women's team event) with Joanna Parker and Kelly Sibley.

She won three Under 21 English National Table Tennis Championships titles. Her representative county is Derbyshire.

== See also ==
- List of England players at the World Team Table Tennis Championships
