= Michael Thornhill (table tennis) =

British table tennis player

Personal information
- Nationality: England
- Born: 26 January 1931; Croydon, England
- Died: 2018 (aged 86–87)

Michael 'Mickey' Thornhill (26 January 1931 – 2018) was a male international table tennis player from England.

He competed at the 1951 World Table Tennis Championships with Ron Crayden, Brian Kennedy, Johnny Leach and Aubrey Simons and 1959 World Table Tennis Championships in the Swaythling Cup (men's team event) with Ian Harrison, Jeff Ingber, Kennedy and Leach for England.

He represented Middlesex at county level and won an English Open title. He was Junior Champion of England in 1948.

== See also ==
- List of England players at the World Team Table Tennis Championships
