= Louise Durrant =

British table tennis player

Personal information
- Nationality: England
- Born: 1984

Louise Durrant is a female former international table tennis player from England.

== Table tennis career ==
She represented England at the 2001 World Table Tennis Championships, in the Corbillon Cup (women's team event) with Helen Lower, Katy Parker and Natalie Bawden.

She won an English National Table Tennis Championships junior title in 2001. Her representative county was Nottinghamshire.

== See also ==
- List of England players at the World Team Table Tennis Championships
