= Xiaoming Wang =

Xiaoming Wang is the name of:

- Xiaoming Wang (paleontologist) (born 1957), Chinese-born vertebrate paleontologist based in the U.S.
- Xiaoming Wang-Dréchou (born 1963), Chinese-born French table tennis player
