= Fielding =

Fielding may refer to:

- Fielding (cricket), the action of fielders collecting the ball in cricket at various positions
- Fielding (baseball), the action of fielders collecting the ball at any of the nine positions
- Fielding (surname)
- Fielding, Iowa, an unincorporated community, United States
- Fielding, Queensland, a locality in the Shire of Carpentaria, Queensland, Australia
- Fielding, Saskatchewan, an unincorporated area, Canada
- Fielding, Utah, a town, United States
- Fielding Bradford House, Kentucky, United States
- Fielding Graduate University, a graduate institution in Santa Barbara, California, United States
- Fielding Mellish, played by Woody Allen in the movie Bananas

== See also ==
- Fielding percentage and fielding error
- Affair of Fielding and Bylandt
- Fielder (disambiguation)
- Feilding, town in New Zealand
