= Maureen Heppell =

British table tennis player

Personal information
- Nationality: England
- Born: 1949 (age 76–77) Northumberland, England

Maureen Heppell is a female former international table tennis player from England.

== Table tennis career ==
She represented England at the 1967 World Table Tennis Championships in the Corbillon Cup (women's team event) with Karenza Smith and Mary Shannon-Wright.

== Personal life ==
Her father Len Heppell (a ballroom dancer) helped train Pop Robson after Robson had met Maureen on the table tennis circuit. Len went on to help many leading football players and managers and Maureen married Robson.

== See also ==
- List of England players at the World Team Table Tennis Championships
