= Richard Fielder =

Richard Fielder may refer to:

- Richard Fielder (cricketer) (1758–1826), English cricketer
- Richard Fielder (writer) (1925–2020), American screenwriter
