= Emily Bolton (table tennis) =

English table tennis player

Personal information
- Nationality: British (English)
- Born: 10 February 1998 (age 28) Askam, Cumbria, England

Sport
- Sport: Table tennis
- Club: St Quentinois (France)

Emily Bolton (born 10 February 1998) is an English international table tennis player. She is a doubles national champion and has represented England at the Commonwealth Games.

== Biography ==
Bolton won the national women's doubles title in 2020, alongside Denise Payet, and also claimed a singles bronze medal in the same year at the English National Table Tennis Championships. At the 2022 edition she and Charlotte Bardsley were beaten by Tin-Tin Ho & Maria Tsaptsinos in the women's doubles final.

In 2022, she was selected for the 2022 Commonwealth Games in Birmingham where she competed in two events; the women's doubles and the women's team events. England reached the quarter-finals in the latter event. Bolton had replaced the injured Mollie Patterson in the England squad.

In 2024, she won a 3rd women's doubles title at the English National Championships, held at the David Ross Sports Village in Nottingham.
