= Trevor Taylor =

Trevor Taylor may refer to:

- Trevor Taylor (racing driver) (1936–2010), British motor racing driver
- Trevor Taylor (politician), Canadian politician
- Trevor Taylor (singer) (1958–2008), Jamaican-German singer, musician, music producer, and songwriter
- Trevor Taylor (table tennis), English table tennis player
