= Terry Young (table tennis) =

British table tennis player

Personal information
- Nationality: England
- Born: 5 December 1978 (age 47)

Terry Young is a male international table tennis player from England.

== Table tennis career ==
He represented England in the 2000 World Table Tennis Championships and 2001 World Table Tennis Championships in the Swaythling Cup (men's team event).

He won a Commonwealth Games team gold in 2002 and has won two English National Table Tennis Championships doubles titles in 2003 and 2005.

== See also ==
- List of England players at the World Team Table Tennis Championships
