= Paul Drinkhall =

British table tennis player

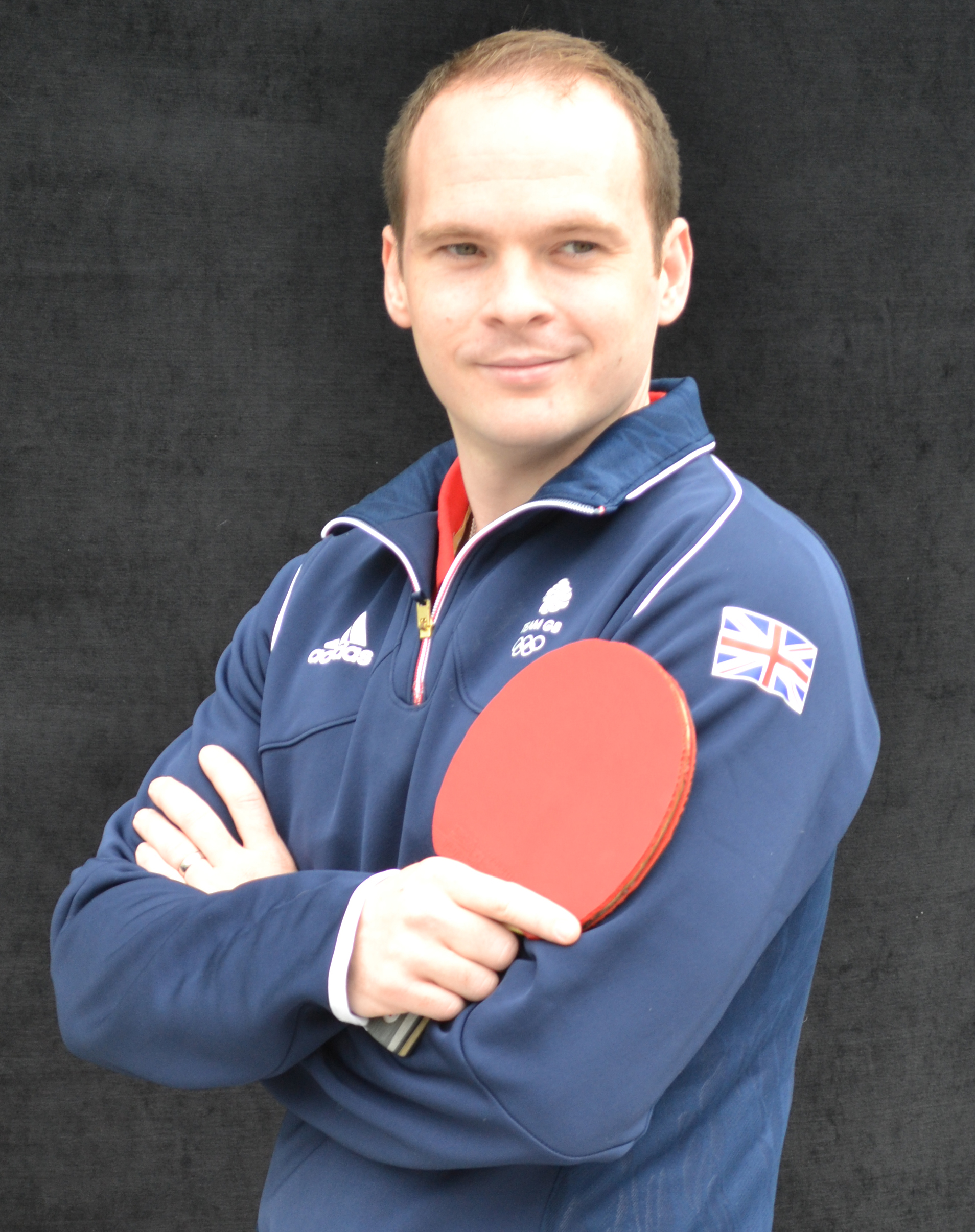

Personal information
- Full name: Paul Andrew Drinkhall
- Born: 16 January 1990 (age 36) Middlesbrough, England
- Height: 1.76 m (5 ft 9 1/2 in)
- Weight: 80 kg (13 st; 180 lb)

Sport
- Sport: Table tennis
- Highest ranking: 32 (September 2016)
- Current ranking: 743 (5 October 2026)
Medal record
Men's table tennis
Representing England
World Championships
Bronze medal – third place	2016 Kuala Lumpur	Team
World Cup
Bronze medal – third place	2018 London	Team
Commonwealth Games
Gold medal – first place	2014 Glasgow	Mixed doubles
Gold medal – first place	2018 Gold Coast	Doubles
Gold medal – first place	2022 Birmingham	Doubles
Silver medal – second place	2010 Delhi	Team
Silver medal – second place	2014 Glasgow	Team
Bronze medal – third place	2010 Delhi	Mixed doubles
Bronze medal – third place	2018 Gold Coast	Team
Bronze medal – third place	2022 Birmingham	Team

Paul Andrew Drinkhall (born 16 January 1990) is a British table tennis player. He won the English Championship seven times in 2007, 2009, 2011, 2012, 2016, 2017 and 2024. Additionally, he competed at three Olympic Games for Team GB at London 2012, Rio 2016 and Tokyo 2020.

== Career ==
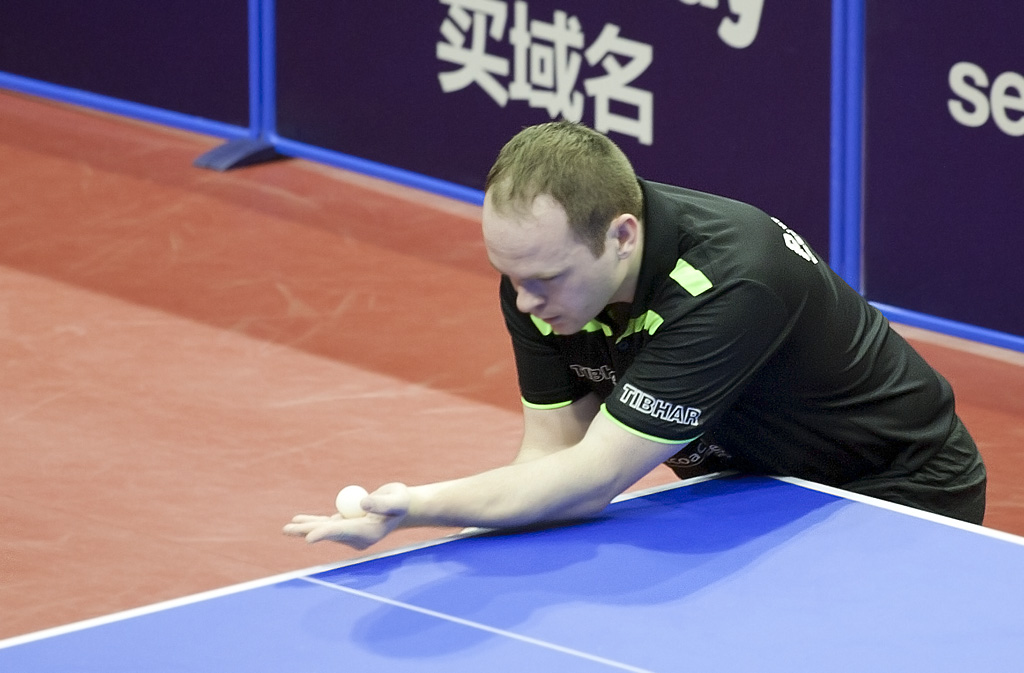
ITTF World Tour 2017 German Open

Drinkhall was born in Middlesbrough. His career in table tennis started in 1997 when he went along to watch his grandfather Ray play in a local league near his home. He enjoyed much success as a youngster, winning numerous national championships at his age level, and at levels above his own age. This success did not go unnoticed, as he was shortlisted for BBC Young Sports Personality of the Year in 2005, and finished in second place after Theo Walcott in 2006. He was again shortlisted for this award in 2007. He once again finished in 2nd place in 2007.

In April 2008 Drinkhall signed with the German team TTC Indeland Jülich for the 2008–09 season, having previously played for another German club, Goennern. In December 2008 he was runner-up at the World Junior Table Tennis Championships in Madrid, losing to Chen Chien-an in the final. In 2010 Drinkhall signed with the Belgian Super Division club Nodo TTC Ekeren.

At the 2010 Commonwealth Games in Delhi he won a silver medal in the Men's Team event and a bronze medal in the Mixed Doubles events.

Drinkhall has been National Champion in every age group so far eligible to compete in - Under 10, Under 11, Under 12, Under 14, Under 17, and Senior Men. Paul became the youngest player since Chester Barnes to win the English Senior Men's title in Sheffield in March 2007 when he overcame the much more experienced former champion Alex Perry from Devon in the 4 - 1 contest.

Drinkhall moved to Italy in September 2011, joining the Sterilgarda club with the intention of raising his performances in the run-up to the 2012 Summer Olympics in London.

=== 2012 Olympic Games ===
Paul Drinkhall qualified for the 2012 Olympic games through a host nation place. In the singles event, Paul defeated Kuwait's Ibrahim Alhasan 4–0 in the preliminary round then beat world ranked 52, Yang Zi from Singapore. In the last 32 stage, Paul lost to Germany's Dimitrij Ovtcharov.

=== Post-2012 Olympics ===
In 2012 Drinkhall joined Werder Bremen's table tennis team and returned to the table tennis Bundesliga after previous spells with Goennern, TTC Indeland Jülich and SV Plüderhausen. Paul was part of the Werder Bremen team that won the Bundesliga that season.

Paul Drinkhall married Joanna Parker, also a professional table tennis player and a multiple English champion, in August 2013.

Drinkhall became only the second English player (after Carl Prean) to win a tournament on the ITTF World Tour Open circuit when he won the Spanish Open in April 2014. This was the first win for a British player in a World Tour singles event in 18 years.

The following month he was part of the England men's team which clinched promotion to the top level of world table tennis at the World Team Championships in Japan.

In June 2014 it was announced that he would be leaving Werder Bremen and rejoining TTC Nodo for the 2014–15 season in order to obtain more playing time, although Werder said that Drinkhall would continue to train with the German club when he was not playing for Nodo or the English national team. Paul won the Belgian League that same season with Nodo.

Drinkhall represented England at the 2014 Commonwealth Games in Glasgow, winning a silver medal in the team competition as Singapore took gold in a repeat of the 2010 result. Paul and Joanna Drinkhall subsequently won a gold in the mixed doubles competition, defeating fellow English pairing Liam Pitchford and Tin-Tin Ho in the final.

In November 2014, Drinkhall reached the final of the Russian Open, beating several top-25 players along the way, including top seed Dimitrij Ovtcharov and third seed Marcos Freitas. His results on the ITTF World Tour meant he qualified for the Grand Finals to be played in Bangkok in December, becoming the first Englishman to compete at the event since 1996. His performances also lifted him to a new career high of No 33 in the ITTF world rankings.

At the inaugural European Games in Baku in June 2015, Drinkhall was seeded 16 and reached the semi-finals, losing to top seed Dimitrij Ovtcharov. He was then beaten in the bronze medal play-off by Lei Kou.

In November 2015, Drinkhall won the men's singles at the Aquece Rio International Tournament - the test event for the Rio Olympics.

In March 2016, Drinkhall was part of the England team, alongside Liam Pitchford and Sam Walker, which won bronze medals at the World Team Championships in Malaysia, England's first medal at that level since 1983 and the first time a newly promoted team had earned a podium place at the event. The same month, he won the national men's singles title for the fifth time in his career.

Drinkhall represented Team GB in singles and team event at the Rio 2016 Olympics, becoming only the third Brit in history to reach the last 16 stage of the singles. In the team event, alongside Liam Pitchford and Sam Walker, he helped GB beat France in the first round, before GB were knocked out by China. After the 2016 Summer Olympics, Drinkhall reached his career-high No 32 spot of the world ranking in September.

In March 2017, Paul became the English Senior National Champion for the 6th time with a 4–2 victory over Sam Walker in the final.

In February 2018, Drinkhall was part of the England squad alongside Liam Pitchford, Sam Walker, David McBeath and Tom Jarvis which won bronze medals by reaching the semi-finals of the ITTF Team World Cup in front of a home crowd at the Copper Box Arena in London.

At the Commonwealth Games in Australia in 2018, Drinkhall won the gold medal in the men's doubles alongside Liam Pitchford and was part of the England squad which won men's team bronze, alongside Pitchford, Sam Walker and David McBeath.

In 2019, Drinkhall became the first English player to win two ITTF World Tour events when he won the Serbia Open.

In 2021, Drinkhall qualified for the Tokyo Olympics at the last minute following Samsonov's abrupt withdrawal from the event.

At the Birmingham 2022 Commonwealth Games, Drinkhall and Liam Pitchford successfully defended their men's doubles title. Drinkkall also reached the men's singles bronze medal play-off, where he was beaten by Sathiyan Gnanasekaran of India. Drinkhall, Pitchford Sam Walker and Tom Jarvis won bronze in the men's team event.

In 2024, he won a 7th men's singles and 14th men's doubles title at the English National Table Tennis Championships, held at the David Ross Sports Village in Nottingham.

In April 2025, Drinkhall & Sam Walker won the Men's Doubles at WTT Feeder Manchester, becoming the first English pair to win a WTT doubles title.

== See also ==
- List of England players at the World Team Table Tennis Championships
