= Graham Sandley =

British table tennis player

Personal information
- Nationality: England
- Born: 1963 (age 62–63)

Graham Sandley is a male former international table tennis player from England.

== Table tennis career ==
He represented England at two World Table Tennis Championships in the Swaythling Cup (men's team event) from 1983 to 1985.

He also won an English National Table Tennis Championships title.

== See also ==
- List of England players at the World Team Table Tennis Championships
