= Table tennis at the 2022 Commonwealth Games – Women's doubles =

Table tennis – Women's doubles at the 2022 Commonwealth Games
- Venue: National Exhibition Centre
- Dates: 4 - 8 August 2022

Medalists
gold medal	Feng Tianwei; Zeng Jian	Singapore
silver medal	Jee Minhyung; Jian Fang Lay	Australia
bronze medal	Charlotte Carey; Anna Hursey	Wales

Table tennis women's doubles at the 2022 Commonwealth Games will be held at the National Exhibition Centre at Birmingham, England from 4 to 8 August 2022.

== Finals ==
Semifinals
Charlotte Carey (WAL); Anna Hursey (WAL)	5	11	11	7	3
Feng Tianwei (SGP); Zeng Jian (SGP)	11	8	9	11	11
Jee Minhyung (AUS); Jian Fang Lay (AUS)	11	11	11
Wong Xin Ru (SGP); Zhou Jingyi (SGP)	9	9	3

Gold medal match
Feng Tianwei (SGP); Zeng Jian (SGP)	11	11	11
Jee Minhyung (AUS); Jian Fang Lay (AUS)	1	8	8
Bronze medal match
Charlotte Carey (WAL); Anna Hursey (WAL)	16	14	9	12
Wong Xin Ru (SGP); Zhou Jingyi (SGP)	14	12	11	10

== Top half ==
=== Section 1 ===
Round of 64

Round of 32
Manika Batra (IND); Diya Chitale (IND)	11	11	11
Rheann Chung (TTO); Catherine Spicer (TTO)	5	7	2
Muizzu Malaak (MDV); Fathimath Nimal (MDV)	6	7	9
Oumehani Hosenally (MRI); Nandeshwaree Jalim (MRI)	11	11	11
Charlotte Carey (WAL); Anna Hursey (WAL)	11	11	11
Christy Bristol (SEY); Laura Sinon (SEY)	2	4	5
Chang Li Sian Alice (MAS); Tee Ai Xin (MAS)	11	11	6	2	7
Fu Ching Nam (CAN); Zhang Mo (CAN)	9	4	11	11	11

Round of 16
Manika Batra (IND); Diya Chitale (IND)	11	11	11
Oumehani Hosenally (MRI); Nandeshwaree Jalim (MRI)	5	5	3
Charlotte Carey (WAL); Anna Hursey (WAL)	12	11	11
Fu Ching Nam (CAN); Zhang Mo (CAN)	10	6	9

Quarterfinals
Manika Batra (IND); Diya Chitale (IND)	7	6	13	10
Charlotte Carey (WAL); Anna Hursey (WAL)	11	11	11	12

=== Section 2 ===
Round of 64
Natalie Cummings (GUY); Chelsea Edghill (GUY)	11	11	5	12
Carolyn Li (FIJ); Grace Rosi Yee (FIJ)	5	6	11	10

Round of 32
Feng Chunyi (AUS); Liu Yangzi (AUS)	11	11	11
Shanecia Delpesche (SVG); Jessica Mc Carter (SVG)	1	1	1
Natalie Cummings (GUY); Chelsea Edghill (GUY)	11	11	9	11
Zodwa Maphanga (RSA); Danisha Patel (RSA)	3	7	11	8
Charlotte Bardsley (ENG); Emily Bolton (ENG)	11	11	11
Jemimah Nakawala (UGA); Judith Nangonzi (UGA)	3	3	4
Ajoke Ojomu (NGR); Esther Oribamise (NGR)	6	5	3
Feng Tianwei (SGP); Zeng Jian (SGP)	11	11	11

Round of 16
Feng Chunyi (AUS); Liu Yangzi (AUS)	11	11	11
Natalie Cummings (GUY); Chelsea Edghill (GUY)	2	6	4
Charlotte Bardsley (ENG); Emily Bolton (ENG)	5	5	2
Feng Tianwei (SGP); Zeng Jian (SGP)	11	11	11

Quarterfinals
Feng Chunyi (AUS); Liu Yangzi (AUS)	11	7	7	3
Feng Tianwei (SGP); Zeng Jian (SGP)	9	11	11	11

== Bottom half ==
=== Section 3 ===
Round of 64
Millicent Ankude (GHA); Cynthia Kwabi (GHA)	5	5	7
Ho Ying (MAS); Karen Lyne (MAS)	11	11	11

Round of 32
Fatima Atinuke Bello (NGR); Offiong Edem (NGR)	11	11	11
Priscilla Greaves (GUY); Thuraia Thomas (GUY)	3	3	5
Lailaa Edwards (RSA); Musfiquh Kalam (RSA)	11	11	6	11
Rita Nakhumitsa (UGA); Florence Seera (UGA)	6	6	11	7
Jee Minhyung (AUS); Jian Fang Lay (AUS)	7	11	6	11	11
Ho Ying (MAS); Karen Lyne (MAS)	11	8	11	7	9
Sadia Mou (BAN); Sonam Sultana (BAN)
Tin-Tin Ho (ENG); Maria Tsaptsinos (ENG)	w	/	o

Round of 16
Fatima Atinuke Bello (NGR); Offiong Edem (NGR)	11	11	11
Lailaa Edwards (RSA); Musfiquh Kalam (RSA)	8	8	2
Jee Minhyung (AUS); Jian Fang Lay (AUS)	5	11	11	14
Tin-Tin Ho (ENG); Maria Tsaptsinos (ENG)	11	8	3	12

Quarterfinals
Fatima Atinuke Bello (NGR); Offiong Edem (NGR)	5	5	6
Jee Minhyung (AUS); Jian Fang Lay (AUS)	11	11	11

=== Section 4 ===
Round of 64

Round of 32
Sreeja Akula (IND); Reeth Tennison (IND)	11	11	11
Lucy Elliott (SCO); Rebecca Plaistow (SCO)	4	5	2
Chloe Thomas Wu Zhang (WAL); Lara Whitton (WAL)	11	7	10	11	13
Sophie Gauthier (CAN); Katherine Morin (CAN)	6	11	12	9	11
Fathimath Dheema Ali (MDV); Aishath Rafa Nazim (MDV)
Leah Cumberbatch (SVG); Unica Velox (SVG)	w	/	o
Sandhana Desscann (MRI); Ruqayyah Kinoo (MRI)	4	3	3
Wong Xin Ru (SGP); Zhou Jingyi (SGP)	11	11	11

Round of 16
Sreeja Akula (IND); Reeth Tennison (IND)	11	11	11
Chloe Thomas Wu Zhang (WAL); Lara Whitton (WAL)	7	4	3
Leah Cumberbatch (SVG); Unica Velox (SVG)	3	2	5
Wong Xin Ru (SGP); Zhou Jingyi (SGP)	11	11	11

Quarterfinals
Sreeja Akula (IND); Reeth Tennison (IND)	14	11	11	8
Wong Xin Ru (SGP); Zhou Jingyi (SGP)	16	13	6	11
