= Ron Crayden =

British table tennis player

Personal information
- Nationality: England
- Born: 8 July 1920 Lambeth, England
- Died: 9 December 2007 (aged 87) Sutton, England

Ronald John Crayden (8 July 1920 – 9 December 2007), was a male international table tennis player from England.

== Table tennis career ==
He made his England debut in 1948 against Wales. He competed at the 1951 World Table Tennis Championships, in the Swaythling Cup with Michael Thornhill, Brian Kennedy, Johnny Leach for England.

He was the non playing captain for the England men's team during the 1961 and 1963 Swaythling Cup and the women's team for the Corbillon Cup, from 1961 to 1969. He was captain of England 225 times.

== Personal life ==
He wrote many books on table tennis including a book called 'The Story of Table Tennis - the First 100 Years'. He married Jean Mae Ricketts on 9th July 1949.

== See also ==
- List of England players at the World Team Table Tennis Championships
