= Ronald Sharman =

British table tennis player

Ronald L Sharman
Personal information
- Nationality: England
Medal record
Representing England
World Table Tennis Championships
Bronze medal – third place	1949	Men's Team

Ronald L Sharman is a male former international table tennis player from England.

== Table tennis career ==
Sharman won a bronze medal at the 1949 World Table Tennis Championships in the Swaythling Cup (men's team) event with Richard Bergmann, Johnny Leach, Aubrey Simons and Viktor Barna for England.

== See also ==
- List of England players at the World Team Table Tennis Championships
- List of World Table Tennis Championships medalists
