= Hannah Hicks =

British table tennis player

Personal information
- Full name: Hannah Charlotte Hicks
- Nationality: England
- Born: 29 April 1991 (age 35)

Sport
- Club: Storfors BTK (Sweden)

Hannah Charlotte Hicks (born 29 April 1991) is a female international table tennis player from England.

== Table tennis career ==
She represented England at three successive World Table Tennis Championships, from 2010 and 2014, in the Corbillon Cup (women's team event).

She competed in the 2010 Commonwealth Games and won a Junior English National Table Tennis Championships title. Her coach is Nicky Jarvis.

== See also ==
- List of England players at the World Team Table Tennis Championships
