= Jean Harrower =

British table tennis player

Personal information
- Nationality: England
- Born: 1943 (age 81–82) Barnet, England

Jean Harrower is a female former international table tennis player from England.

== Table tennis career ==
She represented England at the 1961 World Table Tennis Championships in the Corbillon Cup (women's team event) with Diane Rowe.

She represented Middlesex at county level.

== Personal life ==
Her father was the England international and Table Tennis England magazine editor Geoff Harrower.

== See also ==
- List of England players at the World Team Table Tennis Championships
