= List of England players at the World Team Table Tennis Championships =

== List of England players at the World Team Table Tennis Championships ==
The tables below are the English representatives for the men's and women's teams during the World Table Tennis Championships also known as the Swaythling Cup and Corbillon Cup.

=== Men's team (Swaythling Cup) ===
Year	Host city	Team members
1926	London	Charles Allwright, Bernard Bernstein, Percival Bromfield, Frank Burls, James Thompson
1928	Stockholm	Charles Allwright, Charles Bull, Adrian Haydon, Charles Mase, Fred Perry
1929	Budapest	Charles Bull, Frank Burls, Adrian Haydon, Fred Perry, Frank Wilde
1930	Berlin	Vincent Blatchford, H.C. Cooke, Bernard Hookins, Stanley Proffitt, Tommy Sears
1931	Budapest	Charles Bull, Adrian Haydon, David Jones, Stanley Proffitt, Tommy Sears
1932	Prague	Charles Bull, Adrian Haydon, David Jones, Andrew Millar, Edward Rimer
1933	Baden bei Wien	Alec Brook, Adrian Haydon, David Jones, Andrew Millar, Edward Rimer
1934	Paris	Eric Findon, Don Foulis, Herbert 'Willie' Hales, Ken Hyde, Andrew Millar
1935	Wembley	Maurice Bergl, Adrian Haydon, David Jones, Andrew Millar
1936	Prague	Maurice Bergl, Adrian Haydon, Ken Hyde, Hyman Lurie, Stanley Proffitt
1937	Baden bei Wien	Maurice Bergl, Adrian Haydon (pc), Ken Hyde, Andrew Millar, Stanley Proffitt
1938	Wembley	Ivor Montagu (npc), Maurice Bergl, Ernest Bubley, Eric Filby, Ken Hyde, Hyman Lurie,
1939	Cairo	Ernest Bubley, Ken Hyde, Hyman Lurie, Ken Stanley, Arthur Wilmott
1947	Paris	Adrian Haydon (npc), Ernest Bubley, Benny Casofsky, Eric Filby, George 'Eli' Goodman, Johnny Leach
1948	Wembley	Adrian Haydon (npc), Viktor Barna, Richard Bergmann, Ernest Bubley, Johnny Leach, Ronald Sharman
1949	Stockholm	Adrian Haydon (npc), Viktor Barna, Richard Bergmann, Johnny Leach, Ronald Sharman, Aubrey Simons
1950	Budapest	Adrian Haydon (npc), Richard Bergmann, Bernard Crouch, Johnny Leach, Aubrey Simons, Harry Venner
1951	Vienna	Adrian Haydon (npc), Ron Crayden, Brian Kennedy, Johnny Leach, Aubrey Simons, Michael Thornhill
1952	Bombay	Adrian Haydon (npc), Richard Bergmann, Johnny Leach, Aubrey Simons, Harry Venner
1953	Bucharest	Adrian Haydon (npc), Richard Bergmann, Brian Kennedy, Johnny Leach, Aubrey Simons
1954	Wembley	Adrian Haydon (npc), Richard Bergmann, Kenneth Craigie, Johnny Leach, Aubrey Simons, Harry Venner
1955	Utrecht	Adrian Haydon (npc), Richard Bergmann, Brian Kennedy, Johnny Leach, Bryan Merrett, Alan Rhodes
1956	Tokyo	Ivor Montagu (npc), Viktor Barna, Richard Bergmann, Brian Kennedy, Johnny Leach, Aubrey Simons
1957	Stockholm	Viktor Barna (npc), Richard Bergmann, Ian Harrison, Brian Kennedy, Johnny Leach, Alan Rhodes
1959	Dortmund	Viktor Barna (npc), Ian Harrison, Jeff Ingber, Brian Kennedy, Johnny Leach, Michael Thornhill
1961	Beijing	Ron Crayden (npc), Ian Harrison, Jeff Ingber, Johnny Leach, Bryan Merrett
1963	Prague	Ron Crayden (npc), Chester Barnes, David Creamer, Ian Harrison, Bryan Merrett
1965	Ljubljana	Johnny Leach (npc), Chester Barnes, Denis Neale, Ian Harrison, Brian Wright
1967	Stockholm	Johnny Leach (npc), Chester Barnes, Denis Neale, Stuart Gibbs, Ian Harrison
1969	Munich	Chester Barnes, Denis Neale, Alan Hydes, Trevor Taylor, Brian Wright
1971	Nagoya	Alan Hydes, Trevor Taylor, Tony Clayton
1973	Sarajevo	Desmond Douglas, Alan Hydes, Nicky Jarvis, Denis Neale, Trevor Taylor
1975	Calcutta	Desmond Douglas, Nicky Jarvis, Denis Neale, Trevor Taylor, Jimmy Walker
1977	Birmingham	Andy Barden, Paul Day, Desmond Douglas, Denis Neale
1979	Pyongyang	Paul Day, Desmond Douglas, John Hilton, Nicky Jarvis
1981	Novi Sad	Paul Day, Desmond Douglas, John Hilton, Douggie Johnson
1983	Tokyo	Desmond Douglas, John Hilton, Carl Prean, Graham Sandley
1985	Gothenburg	Sky Andrew, Alan Cooke, Desmond Douglas, Carl Prean, Graham Sandley
1987	New Delhi	Sky Andrew, Alan Cooke, Desmond Douglas, Carl Prean
1989	Dortmund	Sky Andrew, Alan Cooke, Desmond Douglas, Carl Prean
1991	Chiba City	Alan Cooke, Carl Prean, Matthew Syed, Chen Xinhua
1993	Gothenburg	Alan Cooke, Carl Prean, Matthew Syed, Chen Xinhua, Alex Perry
1995	Tianjin	Alan Cooke, Carl Prean, Chen Xinhua, Desmond Douglas
1997	Manchester	Alan Cooke, Carl Prean, Matthew Syed, Alex Perry, Bradley Billington
2000	Kuala Lumpur	Andrew Baggaley, Matthew Syed, Terry Young, Alex Perry, Gareth Herbert
2001	Osaka	Andrew Baggaley, Terry Young, Gareth Herbert
2004	Doha	Not contested
2006	Bremen	Darius Knight, Paul Drinkhall, Andrew Baggaley, Andrew Rushton
2008	Guangzhou	Darius Knight, Paul Drinkhall, Danny Reed
2010	Moscow	Andrew Baggaley, Liam Pitchford, Paul Drinkhall, Danny Reed
2012	Dortmund	Andrew Baggaley, Liam Pitchford, Paul Drinkhall, Danny Reed
2014	Tokyo	Paul Drinkhall, Liam Pitchford, Sam Walker, Danny Reed
2016	Kuala Lumpur	Paul Drinkhall, Liam Pitchford, Sam Walker, Alan Cooke
2018	Halmstad	Paul Drinkhall, Liam Pitchford, Sam Walker
2020	Busan	Not held

- npc = non playing captain
- pc = playing captain

=== Women's team (Corbillon Cup) ===
Year	Host city	Team members
1934	Paris	Dora Emdin, Nora Norrish, Margaret Osborne, Wendy Woodhead
1935	Wembley	Ivor Montagu (npc), Valerie Bromfield, Dora Emdin, Margaret Osborne, Wendy Woodhead
1936	Prague	Lillian Hutchings, Dinah Newey, Margaret Osborne, Wendy Woodhead
1937	Baden bei Wien	Doris Jordan, Margaret Osborne (pc), Constance Wheaton, Wendy Woodhead
1938	Wembley	Daisy Bunbury (npc), Dora Emdin, Phyllis Hodgkinson, Doris Jordan, Margaret Osborne
1939	Cairo	Not contested
1947	Paris	Margaret Osborne-Knott (pc), Elizabeth Blackbourn, Vera Dace, Peggy Franks
1948	Wembley	Margaret Osborne-Knott (npc), Dora Beregi, Peggy Franks, Betty Steventon, Vera Dace-Thomas
1949	Stockholm	Pinkie Barnes, Joan Crosby, Peggy Franks, Adele Wood
1950	Budapest	Dora Beregi Devenney, Vera Dace-Thomas, Peggy Franks, Pinkie Barnes
1951	Vienna	Peggy Franks, Joyce Roberts, Diane Rowe, Rosalind Rowe
1952	Bombay	Kathleen Best, Peggy Franks, Diane Rowe, Rosalind Rowe
1953	Bucharest	Adrian Haydon (npc), Kathleen Best, Diane Rowe, Rosalind Rowe
1954	Wembley	Tommy Sears (npc), Kathleen Best, Ann Haydon, Diane Rowe, Rosalind Rowe
1955	Utrecht	Tommy Sears (npc), Ann Haydon, Diane Rowe, Rosalind Rowe, Jean Winn
1956	Tokyo	Viktor Barna (npc), Ann Haydon, Diane Rowe, Jill Rook
1957	Stockholm	Tommy Sears (npc), Ann Haydon, Joyce Fielder, Jill Rook, Diane Rowe,
1959	Dortmund	Viktor Barna (npc), Ann Haydon, Diane Rowe, Kathleen Best, Pamela Mortimer
1961	Beijing	Ron Crayden (npc), Jean Harrower, Diane Rowe
1963	Prague	Ron Crayden (npc), Lesley Bell, Diane Rowe, Mary Shannon
1965	Ljubljana	Ron Crayden (npc), Lesley Bell, Irene Ogus, Diane Rowe, Mary Shannon
1967	Stockholm	Ron Crayden (npc), Maureen Heppell, Karenza Smith, Mary Shannon-Wright
1969	Munich	Ron Crayden (npc), Karenza Mathews, Judy Williams, Jill Shirley, Mary Shannon-Wright
1971	Nagoya	Karenza Mathews, Pauline Piddock, Jill Shirley
1973	Sarajevo	Karenza Mathews, Linda Howard, Jill Shirley-Hammersley
1975	Calcutta	Karenza Mathews, Linda Howard, Jill Hammersley, Carole Knight
1977	Birmingham	Linda Howard, Jill Hammersley, Carole Knight
1979	Pyongyang	Jill Hammersley, Anita Stevenson, Karen Witt
1981	Novi Sad	Jill Hammersley, Alison Gordon, Linda Jarvis, Karen Witt
1983	Tokyo	Jackie Bellinger, Lisa Bellinger, Karen Witt
1985	Gothenburg	Jackie Bellinger, Lisa Bellinger, Alison Gordon, Karen Witt
1987	New Delhi	Lisa Bellinger, Alison Gordon, Fiona Elliot
1989	Dortmund	Lisa Lomas, Alison Gordon, Fiona Elliot
1991	Chiba City	Lisa Lomas, Fiona Elliot, Andrea Holt
1993	Gothenburg	Lisa Lomas, Nicola Deaton, Fiona Mommessin, Andrea Holt
1995	Tianjin	Lisa Lomas, Nicola Deaton, Alison Gordon, Andrea Holt
1997	Manchester	Lisa Lomas, Nicola Deaton, Andrea Holt, Linda Radford, Helen Lower
2000	Kuala Lumpur	Helen Lower, Kubrat Owolabi, Linda Radford
2001	Osaka	Helen Lower, Natalie Bawden, Katy Parker, Louise Durrant
2004	Doha	Helen Lower, Georgina Walker, Joanna Parker, Kelly Sibley
2006	Bremen	Natalie Bawden, Georgina Walker, Joanna Parker, Kelly Sibley
2008	Guangzhou	Emma Vickers, Joanna Parker, Kelly Sibley
2010	Moscow	Joanna Parker Kelly Sibley, Hannah Hicks, Karina Le Fevre
2012	Dortmund	Joanna Parker Kelly Sibley, Hannah Hicks, Jessica Dawson
2014	Tokyo	Joanna Drinkhall Kelly Sibley, Hannah Hicks, Tin-Tin Ho
2016	Kuala Lumpur	Tin-Tin Ho, Kelly Sibley, Karina Le Fevre
2018	London	Maria Tsaptsinos, Tin-Tin Ho, Denise Payet
2020	Busan	Not held
