= Jackie Bellinger =

British table tennis player

Personal information
- Nationality: England
- Born: 1964; Hackney, England

Jacqueline Bellinger is a female former international table tennis player from England.

== Table tennis career ==
She represented England at two successive World Table Tennis Championships, from 1983 to 1985, in the Corbillon Cup (women's team event).

She won two English National Table Tennis Championships in the doubles, in 1985 and 1987, with her younger sister Lisa Lomas-Bellinger. Her representative county was Bedfordshire.

== See also ==
- List of England players at the World Team Table Tennis Championships
