= Brian Wright (table tennis) =

British table tennis player

Personal information
- Nationality: England
- Born: 1943 (age 81–82)

Brian Wright (born 1943) is a male former international table tennis player from England.

== Table tennis career ==
He represented England at two World Table Tennis Championships in the Swaythling Cup (men's team event) from 1965 to 1969.

He won two English National Table Tennis Championships mixed doubles titles.

== Personal life ==
On 4 September 1965, he married fellow table tennis international Mary Shannon, his frequent partner in mixed doubles competitions. They had at least three children.

== See also ==
- List of England players at the World Team Table Tennis Championships
