= Georgina Walker =

British table tennis player

Personal information
- Nationality: England
- Born: 28 July 1985 (age 40)

Georgina Walker (born 28 July 1985) is a female former international table tennis player from England.

== Table tennis career ==
She represented England at two World Table Tennis Championships, in 2004 and 2006, in the Corbillon Cup (women's team event).

She competed in the 2002 and 2006 Commonwealth Games and won five English National Table Tennis Championships, (two senior and three junior). Her representative county was Nottinghamshire.

== See also ==
- List of England players at the World Team Table Tennis Championships
