= Alan Hydes =

British table tennis player

Personal information
- Nationality: England
- Born: 1947 (age 78–79)

Alan Hydes (born 1947 in Barnsley) is a male former international table tennis player from England.

== Table tennis career ==
He represented England at three World Table Tennis Championships in the Swaythling Cup (men's team event) from 1969-1973.

He won five English National Table Tennis Championships titles and represented Yorkshire at county level and Barnsley.

== See also ==
- List of England players at the World Team Table Tennis Championships
