= Alison Gordon (table tennis) =

British table tennis player

Personal information
- Nationality: England
- Born: 31 December 1962 (age 62); Reading, England
- Height: 1.75 m (5 ft 9 in)

Alison Helen Gordon (married name Broe) is an English former international table tennis player.

== Table tennis career ==
Gordon represented England at five World Table Tennis Championships, in 1981, 1985, 1987, 1989 and 1997, in the Corbillon Cup (women's team event).

Gordon competed in the 1992 Summer Olympics.

Gordon made over 500 international appearances and won seven English National Table Tennis Championships including four singles in 1984, 1988, 1992 and 1996 and also won two English Open titles. Her representative county was Berkshire and she reached a ranking of England number one.

== Personal life ==
Gordon married John Broe.

== See also ==
- List of England players at the World Team Table Tennis Championships
