= You Are Awesome =

Young adult non-fiction book

You Are Awesome: Find Your Confidence and Dare to be Brilliant at (Almost) Anything
- Author: Matthew Syed
- Publication date: April 2018

You Are Awesome: Find Your Confidence and Dare to be Brilliant at (Almost) Anything, is a young adult non-fiction book written by the British author Matthew Syed and first published by Wren & Rook, an imprint of the Hachette Book Group, in April 2018. The book deals with themes such as growth mindset, resilience and building confidence. It was awarded the title Children's Illustrated Non-Fiction Book of the Year by the British Book Awards in 2019 and was listed on The Sunday Times Bestseller list in July 2018. The title was closely followed by the publication of The You Are Awesome Journal in September 2018.

You Are Awesome has been translated into a number of languages including Catalan, Spanish, Italian, German and Polish. It was released in The United States and Canada by the publisher Sourcebooks in July 2019.

In August 2019, a further follow up title to the series, Dare to Be You, was announced for 2020.
