= Fiona Elliot =

British table tennis player

Personal information
- Nationality: England

Fiona Elliot is a female former international table tennis player from England.

== Table tennis career ==
She represented England at four successive World Table Tennis Championships, from 1987 until 1993, in the Corbillon Cup (women's team event).

She won 15 English National Table Tennis Championships including two singles titles in 1987 and 1990.

== Personal life ==
She married French international Didier Mommessin and then competed as Fiona Mommessin.

== See also ==
- List of England players at the World Team Table Tennis Championships
