= Fielder Mountain =

Mountain peak in Oregon, United States

Coordinates: 42.445579°N 123.216593°W

Fielder Mountain is a summit in the U.S. state of Oregon. The elevation is 3,750 feet (1,140 m). It is located in Jackson Country near the city of Rogue River.

Fielder Mountain was named after Thomas Fielder, a pioneer settler.
