= Chester Barnes =

English table tennis player (1947–2021)

- Born: George Barnes; 27 January 1947; Forest Gate, Essex, England, UK
- Died: 18 March 2021 (aged 74)
- Occupation: Racehorse Assistant Trainer

George "Chester" Barnes (27 January 1947 – 18 March 2021) was an English table tennis champion, who was England No. 1 player for many years during the 1960s and 1970s.

When he retired from professional table tennis he took up a post with the Martin Pipe racing stables as an assistant to the racehorse trainer.

== Early life ==
Barnes was born in a maternity home in Forest Gate, Greater London, on 27 January 1947. When he was about a year old his family moved to live on a farm near Basingstoke, Hampshire. Barnes' family also lived for a short period on a farm in Whitley Wood near Reading.

In his autobiography, More Than A Match, Barnes sets out the details of how he came to be known as 'Chester'. His father was listening to the radio at the time of his birth when he was asked by the matron of the maternity home what Christian name he was going to be called by. The programme playing on the radio at the time was the Charlie Chester Show, and his father replied: "We'll call him Chester." The book then goes on to say that Barnes was never actually christened with the name Chester although he was called by this name by both family and friends and has never been known as George.

== Early career ==
At the age of 10 he joined Len Hoffman's Youth Club, close to Godwin Road School, which he attended. Whilst at the school he was selected for the swimming, athletics and cricket teams, and at first had no interest in table tennis. In his autobiography, he states that he first picked up a table tennis bat when visiting a snooker hall with an uncle. He was stopped from playing snooker because the manager at the club felt he was too short and he couldn't see over the table. His uncle, rather than disappoint him, said they could play a game of table tennis instead. It was on this occasion that he picked up a table tennis bat for the first time and realised that there was a lot of skill required to play it well.

At the age of 11 he started his secondary education at the Forest Gate County High School. Because of his interest in cricket, he was invited to attend the Essex County Cricket Club Training School in Ilford where Barry Knight was the resident cricket coach. It was the experience of having a very fast ball bowled to him by Barry Knight that led him to realise that his sporting future did not lie in cricket, because he felt that it was too dangerous. In his autobiography he says he was never really a 'team' player, so table tennis was more suited to his personal sporting ambitions.

During the school summer holidays in 1959, at the age of 12, he took his first step towards becoming a serious table tennis player, when the Len Hoffman Youth Club took a group of boys to Butlin's holiday camp in Clacton. While the other boys in the group tried other activities, he stayed in the table tennis hall, where that he received coaching from Harry Venner, who was the resident coach and an England international at the time. Because he showed a lot of enthusiasm for the game and because of his rapid progress in learning how to play, Venner nominated him for 'Boy of the week' prize, a competition that was sponsored by the News of the World newspaper. Winning this prize meant that he could return later in the summer season for a free week's holiday to receive more coaching. This also gave him the opportunity to be coached by the England No. 1 at the time, Ian Harrison of Gloucestershire. The following year, Barnes again went on holiday with his family to Butlin's, at their Bognor Regis holiday camp. Despite having to compete with the two top England junior boys at the time, Maurice Billington of Warwickshire and Brian Hill from Lincolnshire, he was once again awarded the coveted News of the World 'Boy of the Week' prize, presented by Johnny Leach, the former table tennis World champion.

In 1963, aged 16, Barnes became the youngest ever winner of the English Closed Table Tennis Championships. He retained the title for three consecutive years, by winning the competition in 1964 and 1965. At the start of the season of 1963/64 in September, Barnes was ranked at No. 3 in the English senior rankings and at No. 1 in the junior rankings. The top two positions in the English rankings were occupied by Harrison and Bryan Merrett, both of Gloucestershire. Harrison had been the England No. 1 for the previous four seasons. Barnes successfully defended the English Closed title that he had won the previous year in 1963 and, in early January 1964, when the ETTA published the new English rankings, his reward was to be promoted to the No. 1 spot for the first time in his career. At this time Barnes was still three weeks short of his 17th birthday.

Harrison and Barnes became good friends and fierce competitors. They teamed up on many occasions for exhibition matches, the most notable of which was on the BBC live Saturday afternoon flagship sports programme, Grandstand, when they were due to play an international match against the East Germany national team. Because the German team were delayed in reaching the venue the two top England players put on an exhibition match instead. This match was watched by millions of viewers and did a great deal to lift the profile of English table tennis at the time.

== Later career ==
In the course of his table tennis career, Barnes won many tournaments at junior and senior levels of the game around the UK, and also at national and international level. He was a top-ranked player in the world rankings at a time when the men's game was dominated by the Japanese, Chinese, and top European countries, notably Sweden, Yugoslavia and Germany. He was also an exceptional doubles player and played with many of the top men and women players of his day, winning numerous men's and mixed doubles titles. He played on numerous occasions for his county of Essex at the top level of the game, helping them to win the national English county table tennis league on several occasions. He represented England as an international on many occasions and played regularly in the Swaythling Cup, the table tennis equivalent of the Davis Cup. Barnes won the English Closed five times, and turned professional in 1975.

Early in his career, Barnes was involved in several clashes with officialdom. In a short time he became one of the best known sports personalities in England and demands for interviews, television appearances and exhibitions poured in. At the age of 16 he became the first English table tennis player in the history of the game to have a personal manager (Peter Madge) to handle his business interests, and the publicity that surrounded his success is well documented. His fame and success was such that he was approached by a leading publisher at the time (Stanley Paul & Co. Ltd., part of the Hutchinson Publishing Group) to write his autobiography.

The footballer, George Best, was a notable sportsman who had business and work interests outside his sport and, despite his amateur status as a table tennis player, Barnes too was making money from modelling and having sports equipment branded with his name. During his amateur career he both attracted and courted controversy. He used a unique square racket, which also catered for his preference for a bat that was heavier than a normal bat. He was one of the earliest British players to adopt the topspin attack style used by the best European and Asian players, along with the smooth reverse rubber used on the new rackets. Because of an old rule forbidding the use of reflective surfaces, this occasionally resulted in disqualification if the rubber became shiny in use.

Barnes was regarded as an anti-establishment figure in the world of table tennis, in keeping with the trends of the time, and was frequently in trouble with the English Table Tennis Association, whom he saw as too conservative and even a clique that did not look after the best interests of the players. In his autobiography he described an incident where he issued a public ultimatum to the association to name him the No. 1 English player, having already been told behind the scenes that this would happen. The resulting publicity only helped to further his career and bring him more notoriety.

== Horse Racing career ==
Barnes later became assistant trainer to Martin Pipe, the British National Hunt trainer who modernised training methods, in much the same way - and sometimes courting the same controversy - as Barnes had in table tennis. He was a key player in helping the handler win the UK Trainers' title on fifteen occasions between 1988 and 2005, running Pipe's telephone tipster line and later producing a daily blog, 'Chester's Chat'. Pipe described him as "the heart and soul of our team".

== Death ==
He died on 18 March 2021 from a heart attack. Barnes is survived by his wife Jane, son Lester and daughter Joanne.

== Works ==
- More Than a Match (Stanley Paul & Co. Ltd., 1969)
- Modern Table Tennis Tactics (1973)
- Table Tennis (1975)
- Advanced Table Tennis Tactics (1975)

== See also ==
- List of England players at the World Team Table Tennis Championships
