= Lisa Lomas =

British table tennis player

Personal information
- National team: United Kingdom
- Born: 9 March 1967 (age 58)
- Occupation: Table tennis player
- Height: 168 cm (5 ft 6 in)
- Weight: 63 kg (139 lb)

Achievements and titles
- Olympic finals: 1992, 1996
- Regional finals: 1992
- Updated on 16 September 2017

Lisa Jane Lomas-Bellinger (née Bellinger, born 9 March 1967) is a British former table tennis player. She competed in the 1992 and 1996 Summer Olympics.

== Career ==
Lomas won a silver medal at the 1992 European Table Tennis Championships, losing to Bettine Vriesekoop in the final. She was eliminated in the group stages of the women's singles competition at the 1996 Summer Olympics. Lomas won the women's singles event at the English National Table Tennis Championships four times, and the women's doubles event nine times. Lomas and Jackie Bellinger hold the record for most balls hit back and forth in 60 seconds; they set the record of 173 in 1993.

== See also ==
- List of England players at the World Team Table Tennis Championships
