= Agnès Le Lannic =

French table tennis player

Personal information
- Nationality: France
Medal record
Representing France
World Table Tennis Championships
| Bronze medal – third place | 1991 | women's team |

Agnès Le Lannic is a female former international table tennis player from France.

== Table tennis career ==
She won a bronze medal for France at the 1991 World Table Tennis Championships in the Corbillon Cup (women's team event) with Emmanuelle Coubat, Sandrine Derrien and Xiaoming Drechou.

== See also ==
- List of World Table Tennis Championships medalists
