= Alex Perry (table tennis) =

English table tennis player

Personal information
- Nationality: England
- Born: 30 July 1975

Alex Perry is a male former international table tennis player from England.

== Table tennis career ==
He represented England at three World Table Tennis Championships in the Swaythling Cup (men's team event) from 1993-2000.

He won 14 English National Table Tennis Championships titles.

== Personal life ==
He married fellow English international Nicola Deaton.

== See also ==
- List of England players at the World Team Table Tennis Championships
