= Emmanuelle Coubat =

French table tennis player

Personal information
- Nationality: France
- Born: April 1, 1970 Besançon
Medal record
Representing France
World Table Tennis Championships
Bronze medal – third place	1991	women's team

Emmanuelle Coubat (born 1 April 1970) is a female former international table tennis player from France.

== Table tennis career ==
She won a bronze medal for France at the 1991 World Table Tennis Championships in the Corbillon Cup (women's team event) with Sandrine Derrien, Xiaoming Drechou and Agnès Le Lannic.

She represented France at two Olympic Games in 1992 and 1996.

She also won a European Table Tennis Championships bronze medal and is four times singles champion of France in 1988, 1992, 1993 and 1996. In addition she won seven national doubles titles (six with Sylvie Plaisant), and four national mixed doubles with Olivier Marmurek.

== See also ==
- List of World Table Tennis Championships medalists
