= Andrea Holt =

British table tennis player

Personal information
- Nationality: England
- Born: 11 November 1970 (age 54); Radcliffe, Greater Manchester, England

Andrea Holt is a former female international table tennis player from England.

== Table tennis career ==
She represented England at four successive World Table Tennis Championships, from 1991 until 1997, in the Corbillon Cup (women's team event).

She competed in the 1992 Summer Olympics and 1996 Summer Olympics.

She won 10 English National Table Tennis Championships, including five singles titles spanning from 1991 until 2004.

== See also ==
- List of England players at the World Team Table Tennis Championships
