= Fielding, Iowa =

- Unincorporated community
- Location within Iowa
- Coordinates: 42°39′47″N 95°48′01″W
- Country: United States
- State: Iowa
- County: Cherokee
- Elevation: 1,394 ft (425 m)
- Time zone: UTC-6 (Central (CST))
  - Summer (DST): UTC-5 (CDT)
- Area code: 712
- GNIS feature ID: 464541

Fielding is an unincorporated community in Tilden Township, Cherokee County, Iowa, United States. Fielding is located along County Highway L36, 14 miles (23 km) west-southwest of Cherokee.

== History ==
Fielding's population was 12 in 1925. The population was just 3 in 1940.
