= Linda Jarvis-Howard =

British table tennis player

Linda Jarvis (née Howard)
Personal information
- Nationality: English

Linda Jarvis (née Howard) is a female former international table tennis player from England.

== Table tennis career ==
She represented England at four World Table Tennis Championships in the Corbillon Cup (women's team event) from 1973 to 1981.

She won 12 English National Table Tennis Championships titles.

== Personal life ==
Linda married Nicky Jarvis in 1979 and their son is professional footballer Matt Jarvis. Her sister Susan Howard was also an English international.

== See also ==
- List of England players at the World Team Table Tennis Championships
