= Fielder Creek =

Stream in Oregon, U.S.

Coordinates: 42°28′20″N 123°11′04″W

Fielder Creek is a stream in the U.S. state of Oregon. It is a tributary to Evans Creek.

Fielder Creek was named after Thomas Fielder, a pioneer citizen.
