= David Ross Sports Village =

Multi-sport facility in Nottingham, England

- Interactive map of David Ross Sports Village
- Address: Beeston Lane, Lenton Abbey, Nottingham NG9 2RZ; Nottingham; England
- Coordinates: (52°56′22″N 1°12′29″W)
- Owner: University of Nottingham

Construction
- Opened: October 2016
- Cost: £40 million

Website
- Official website

The David Ross Sports Village is a multi-sport facility in Nottingham, England. The facility is owned and operated by the University of Nottingham and was opened in 2016 at a cost of £40 million. The village includes an indoor area, which features a large sports hall, fencing, archery, martial arts and table tennis rooms and four glass squash courts. Additionally, there is a sports injury clinic and a high-performance zone. The outdoor area features two artificial pitches, netball courts, tennis courts, a basketball court and the University of Nottingham Swimming pool.

== History ==
The site opened in October 2016 and is named after the university's benefactor David Ross, who had donated more than £10 million to the university.

The squash courts have been used for the British National Squash Championships in 2019, 2020 and 2022.

The sports hall was used as the venue for the English National Badminton Championships in 2023 and 2024.

The Table tennis rooms were used as the venue for the English National Table Tennis Championships in 2023 and 2024.
