= Darius Knight =

British table tennis player

Personal information
- Nationality: England
- Born: 22 February 1990 (age 36)

Sport
- Club: York Gardens and Barrow Table Tennis Club

Darius Knight (born 22 February 1990) is an international table tennis player from England.

== Table tennis career ==
Knight represented England at two World Table Tennis Championships in the Swaythling Cup (men's team event) from 2006 to 2008.

Knight has won seven English National Table Tennis Championships titles (four in the singles and three in the mixed doubles).

== See also ==
- List of England players at the World Team Table Tennis Championships
