= Walter Fielder =

English cricketer

Personal information
- Full name: Walter George Fielder
- Born: 6 March 1899; Fareham, Hampshire, England
- Died: 7 January 1968 (aged 68); Sarisbury Green, Hampshire, England
- Batting: Right-handed

Domestic team information
- Years: Team
- 1923: Hampshire

Career statistics
Competition	First-class
Matches	1
Runs scored	2
Batting average	–
100s/50s	0/0
Top score	2*
Balls bowled	42
Wickets	0
Bowling average	–
5 wickets in innings	–
10 wickets in match	–
Best bowling	–
Catches/stumpings	2/–
- Source: Cricinfo, 13 September 2023

Walter George Fielder (6 March 1899 — 7 January 1968) was an English first-class cricketer.

Fielder was born at Fareham in March 1899. A club cricketer who played as a bowler for Sarisbury Green Cricket Club, Fielder made a single appearance in first-class cricket for Hampshire against Leicestershire at Leicester in the 1923 County Championship. Batting in Hampshire's first innings, he remained not out on 2, whilst with the ball he bowled seven wicketless overs in Leicestershire's only innings. Outside of cricket, he played football for Sarisbury F.C. Fielder died at Sarisbury Green in January 1968.
