= Nicky Jarvis =

English table tennis player

Personal information
- Nationality: English

Nicholas 'Nicky' Jarvis is a male former international table tennis player from England.

== Table tennis career ==
He represented England at three World Table Tennis Championships in the Swaythling Cup (men's team event) from 1973-1979.

He won two English National Table Tennis Championships titles. He later became the head coach of the National team and Head Performance coach & Technical Manager at the English Table Tennis Association.

== Personal life ==
He married Linda Howard in 1979 and their son is professional footballer Matt Jarvis.

== See also ==
- List of England players at the World Team Table Tennis Championships
