= Nicola Deaton =

British table tennis player

Personal information
- Nationality: England
- Born: 29 October 1976 Chesterfield, England

Nicola Deaton is a female former international table tennis player from England.

== Table tennis career ==
She represented England at three successive World Table Tennis Championships, from 1993 until 1997, in the Corbillon Cup (women's team event).

She won 16 English National Table Tennis Championships including five singles titles. Deaton reached the ranking of England number one.

== Personal life ==
She married fellow English international Alex Perry.

== See also ==
- List of England players at the World Team Table Tennis Championships
