= Joyce Fielder =

British table tennis player

Personal information
- Nationality: England
- Born: 1938

Joyce Fielder is a female former international table tennis player from England.

== Table tennis career ==
She won the 1953 National girls singles title aged 15. She was ranked number one in Kent.

She represented England at the 1957 World Table Tennis Championships in the Corbillon Cup (women's team event) with Ann Haydon, Jill Rook and Diane Rowe for England.

== Personal life ==
During her childhood she lived with her family at the New Eltham Sportsground where her father was a groundsman. Her great uncle was England cricket international Arthur Fielder.

== See also ==
- List of England players at the World Team Table Tennis Championships
