= Sandrine Derrien =

French table tennis player

Personal information
- Nationality: France
Medal record
Representing France
World Table Tennis Championships
Bronze medal – third place	1991	women's team

Sandrine Derrien is a female former international table tennis player from France.

== Table tennis career ==
She won a bronze medal for France at the 1991 World Table Tennis Championships in the Corbillon Cup (women's team event) with Emmanuelle Coubat, Xiaoming Drechou and Agnès Le Lannic.

She also won a women's doubles and mixed doubles National title.

== See also ==
- List of World Table Tennis Championships medalists
