= Karenza Mathews =

English table tennis player

Karenza Mathews (née Smith)
Personal information
- Nationality: England
- Born: Karenza Smith; 1950 (age 75–76) Bristol, England

Sport
- Sport: Table Tennis

Karenza Mathews (née Smith) is a female former international table tennis player from England.

== Table tennis career ==
She represented England at five World Table Tennis Championships in the Corbillon Cup (women's team event) from 1967 to 1975. She also reached the quarter-finals of the Women's Doubles with Mary Shannon-Wright and the Mixed Doubles with Denis Neale in 1967.

Karenza was England number one and won 231 senior caps and won a bronze medal in the team event at the European Table Tennis Championships in 1970.

She won an English Open title and 15 English National Table Tennis Championships titles.

== Personal life ==
She married Kenneth Mathews on 18 May 1968. She then had two daughters who both married and have had a daughter and a son each.

== See also ==
- List of England players at the World Team Table Tennis Championships
