= Jeff Ingber =

English table tennis player (1935–2019)

Personal information
- Nationality: England
- Born: 17 September 1935; Manchester, England
- Died: 7 July 2019 (aged 83)

Jeff Ingber (17 September 1935 – 7 July 2019) was an English international table tennis player.

== Table tennis career ==
He first played in the Junior singles at the 1947 English Open.

He competed at the World Table Tennis Championships, in the Swaythling Cup during 1959 and 1961 for England.

He won several gold medals at the Maccabiah Games, and at the 1969 Maccabiah Games won a silver medal in men's singles and a gold medal in mixed doubles with Irene Ogus. He reached the 1961 English Open final of the mixed doubles.

== Personal life ==
He was born in Manchester and was Jewish.

He died on 7 July 2019.

== See also ==
- List of England players at the World Team Table Tennis Championships
