= Linda Radford =

English table tennis player (born 1976)

Personal information
- Nationality: England
- Born: 1975 (age 49–50) Dagenham, England

Linda Radford (married name March), is a female former international table tennis player from England.

== Table tennis career ==
She represented England at two World Table Tennis Championships, in 1997 and 2000, in the Corbillon Cup (women's team event).

Linda won a Commonwealth Table Tennis Championships silver medal in the women's team event in Glasgow 1997.

She won an English National Table Tennis Championships in 1995. Her representative county was Essex.

== Personal life ==
After marrying James March in 2001, she competed as Linda Radford-March. Her mother is Lesley Bell, who also represented England at the World Table Tennis Championships. Her father Peter Radford and grandmother Brenda Bell both have been England Veteran Champions, and her brother Allan represented Essex. She now has two daughters.

== See also ==
- List of England players at the World Team Table Tennis Championships
