= Karen Witt =

English table tennis player

Personal information
- Nationality: England

Karen Witt is a female former international table tennis player from England.

== Table tennis career ==
She represented England at four successive World Table Tennis Championships, from 1979 to 1985, in the Corbillon Cup (women's team event).

She was the Commonwealth Individual Ladies' Singles Champion in 1985.

She won a European Table Tennis Championships medal and won three English National Table Tennis Championships including the singles in 1983. Her representative county was Berkshire.

== See also ==
- List of England players at the World Team Table Tennis Championships
