= Alan Cooke (table tennis) =

British table tennis player

Personal information
- Nationality: England
- Born: 23 March 1966 (age 58); Chesterfield, Derbyshire, England
- Height: 170 cm (5 ft 7 in)
- Weight: 64 kg (141 lb)

Alan Cooke (born 23 March 1966 in Chesterfield, Derbyshire) is an English former international table tennis player and current coach. He is a six-time National Singles Champion and has won 18 National titles.

He made his senior England debut in the Israeli Open just before his 17th birthday and played in the 1988 Summer Olympics.

In 2016 he coached the England team to a bronze medal at the 2016 World Table Tennis Championships.

== See also ==
- List of England players at the World Team Table Tennis Championships
