= Xiaoming Wang-Dréchou =

Chinese-French table tennis player

Personal information
- Nationality: France
- Born: June 14, 1963 Yibin, China
Medal record
Representing France
World Table Tennis Championships
Bronze medal – third place	1991	women's team

Xiaoming Wang-Dréchou (Chinese: 王晓明; pinyin: Wáng Xiǎomíng, born 14 June 1963) is a Chinese-born French female former international table tennis player.

== Table Tennis career ==
She won a bronze medal for France at the 1991 World Table Tennis Championships in the Corbillon Cup (women's team event) with Emmanuelle Coubat, Sandrine Derrien, and Agnès Le Lannic.

She represented France at the 1992 and 1996 Summer Olympics.

== See also ==
- List of World Table Tennis Championships medalists
