= Natalie Bawden =

British table tennis player

Personal information
- Nationality: England
- Born: 1 September 1984 (age 40)

Natalie Bawden is a female former international table tennis player from England.

== Table tennis career ==
She represented England at two World Table Tennis Championships, in 2001 and 2006, in the Corbillon Cup (women's team event).

She won two English National Table Tennis Championships doubles titles in 2005 and 2007. Her representative county is Essex.

Natalie Bawden is currently assistant coach at Grantham College and coaches one of the future English stars Raquel Sao Pedro

== See also ==
- List of England players at the World Team Table Tennis Championships
