= Carole Knight =

British table tennis player

Personal information
- Nationality: England
- Born: 9 June 1957; Middlesbrough, England

Carole Knight, married name Moore, is a female former international table tennis player from England.

== Table tennis career ==
She represented England at the 1975 World Table Tennis Championships and 1977 World Table Tennis Championships in the Corbillon Cup (women's team event).

She won seven English National Table Tennis Championships, (three singles, three doubles and one mixed doubles as Carole Moore) and two European Table Tennis Championships medals.

== See also ==
- List of England players at the World Team Table Tennis Championships
