= Paul Day (table tennis) =

British table tennis player

Personal information
- Nationality: England
- Born: 1958

Paul Day is a male former international table tennis player from England.

== Table tennis career ==
He represented England at three World Table Tennis Championships in the Swaythling Cup (men's team event) from 1977 to 1981.

He won nine English National Table Tennis Championships titles.

== Personal life ==
His parents Eric and Winnie hosted home premier division matches for the Soham team in their grounds.

== See also ==
- List of England players at the World Team Table Tennis Championships
