= Richard Fielder (cricketer) =

English cricketer

Personal information
- Born: 1758; East Malling, Kent
- Died: 1826 (aged 67–68); Gravesend, Kent

Domestic team information
- Years: Team
- 1792–1796: Kent

Richard Fielder (1758–1826) was an English cricketer who played in 20 matches between 1790 and 1801.

== Career ==
Fielder was born at East Malling in Kent in 1758. He is first known to have played in 1790, playing in an important match for East Kent against West Kent at Bishopsbourne Paddock near Canterbury. He played regularly for Kent and for England (i.e., the "rest" of England) between 1792 and 1796. A total of 18 of his 20 matches were played during these seasons, 11 for Kent, six for England as well as one for a team organised by Richard Leigh, an influential organiser of matches who lived in the Dartford area of Kent.

From 1801 to 1803 Fielder played for Surrey. Writing in 1862, Arthur Haygarth said he was "a very fine field and catch". In his 20 known matches, Fielder scored 281 runs with a highest score of 35. He took at least one wicket. (Note: In the period Fielder played, wickets taken by bowlers were normally only recorded if they were bowled. Other means of dismissal were not credited to any bowler.)

Fielder worked as a horse trainer and is thought to have eloped with one of his riding pupils. Afterwards they kept the Woolpack Inn at Tenterden. He died at Gravesend in 1826.

== Bibliography ==
- Birley, Derek (1999). A Social History of English Cricket. London: Aurum Press. ISBN 978-18-54107-10-7 – via Internet Archive.
- Carlaw, Derek (2020). Kent County Cricketers, A to Z: Part One (1806–1914) (PDF). Cardiff: ACS.
- Lewis, Paul (2014). For Kent and Country. Eastbourne: Reveille Press. ISBN 978-19-08336-63-7.
