= Helen Lower =

English table tennis player

Personal information
- Nationality: England
- Born: 9 May 1970 (age 55) Wolverhampton, England

Helen Lower is a female former international table tennis player from England.

== Table tennis career ==
She represented England at four successive World Table Tennis Championships, from 1997 until 2004, in the Corbillon Cup (women's team event).

She won 16 English National Table Tennis Championships including five singles titles. (16 constitutes the second best women's record behind Jill Hammersley). Lower also played professional club tennis in France.

== See also ==
- List of England players at the World Team Table Tennis Championships
