= Matthew Syed =

English writer and former table tennis player

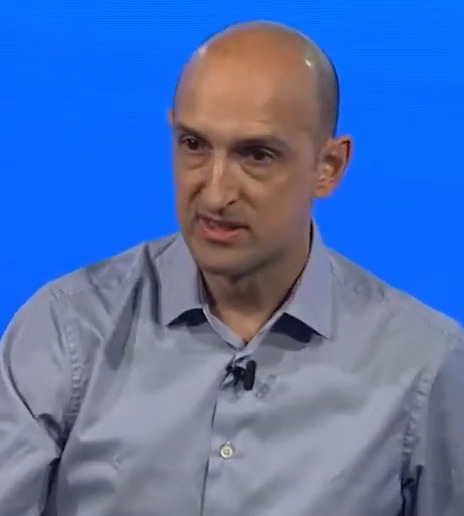
- Syed in 2018
- Born: Matthew Philip Syed; 2 November 1970 (age 55); Reading, Berkshire, England
- Education: Balliol College, Oxford (BA)
- Occupation: Writer
- Employer: The Times; The Sunday Times
- Political party: Conservative
- Spouse: Kathy Weeks
- Children: 2
- Sports career
Medal record
Men's Table Tennis
Representing England
Gold medal – first place	2002 Manchester	Men's – Team
- Website: www.matthewsyed.co.uk

Matthew Philip Syed (born 2 November 1970) is an English writer, radio presenter and former table tennis player.

Syed competed as an England table tennis international, and was the English number one. He is a three-time men's singles champion at the Commonwealth Table Tennis Championships (in 1997, 2000 and 2001), and also competed for Great Britain in two Olympic Games: at Barcelona in 1992 and at Sydney in 2000.

Syed entered journalism, and later became a writer. He has worked for The Times newspaper since 1999, and has published several books.

== Early life ==
Syed was born in Reading, Berkshire, England. His father, Abbas Syed, was a Pakistani immigrant to Britain who converted from Islam to Christianity, and his mother is Welsh.

Syed attended the Maiden Erlegh School in Earley near Reading, then studied at Balliol College, Oxford, where he graduated with first-class honours in Philosophy, Politics and Economics in 1995.

== Sporting career ==
A right-handed table-tennis player, Syed was the top-ranked player in England for nearly 10 years. He reached his top world ranking of 25 at the end of 1998.

He reached the final of the European Youth Championships in 1985, losing to Dmitry Mazunov. Syed was a member of the England team that won the European title in 1986.

He represented Great Britain in the men's singles at the 1992 Olympics in Barcelona and the 2000 Olympic Games in Sydney, but failed to reach the second knockout stage each time. He says that he "choked" at the Sydney Olympics: "when I walked out into the mega-watt light of the competition arena, I could hardly hit the ball."

He was English champion four times: in 1997, 1998, 2000 and 2001. He also won the men's singles event at three consecutive Commonwealth Table Tennis Championships (in 1997 in Glasgow, 2000 in Singapore and 2001 in Delhi), and also won three titles as a member of the English men's team in 1994, 1997 and 2000. He was a member of the England men's team that won the gold medal at the 2002 Commonwealth Games in Manchester.

== Author and commentator ==
Syed has worked as a commentator for the BBC and Eurosport, and as a journalist for The Times since 1999. He is a regular radio and television commentator on sporting, cultural and political issues. His film China and Table Tennis, made for the BBC, won bronze medal at the Olympic Golden Rings ceremony in Lausanne in 2008.

Syed's style has been mocked by satirical magazine Private Eye.

In his second book, Black Box Thinking, which was published by John Murray in 2015, he argues that the key to success is a positive attitude to failure.

Syed is the co-founder of Matthew Syed Consulting. He was one of the co-founders of TTK Greenhouse, a sports-related charity.

Syed hosts a BBC Radio 5 Live podcast called Flintoff, Savage & The Ping Pong Guy with ex-England cricketer Andrew Flintoff and former Blackburn Rovers captain Robbie Savage. Current sporting topics are discussed on the podcast.

In 2016, Syed was awarded an honorary doctorate in Liberal Arts by Abertay University in Dundee.

His book You Are Awesome was published in 2018. The publisher describes it as "a positive and empowering guide to help children build resilience". A follow-up, Dare to be You, was released in 2020.

In 2021, Syed began presenting a new programme on BBC Radio 4, Sideways, about "the ideas that shape our lives". In 2022, he published his third children's book, What Do You Think? (2022).

== Politics ==
Syed stood as the Labour Party candidate in the 2001 UK General Election in Wokingham, coming third in a safe Conservative seat. He won a place on the Labour shortlist to succeed Ashok Kumar for the Middlesbrough South and East Cleveland constituency in the 2010 UK General Election, but the party selected Tom Blenkinsop, who had worked in Kumar's constituency office for six years.

In the 2019 Conservative Party leadership election, Syed endorsed Jeremy Hunt. In 2025, Syed formally joined the Conservative Party.

== Personal life ==
Syed is married to Kathy Weeks. They have a son and a daughter.

== Books ==
- Bounce: Mozart, Federer, Picasso, Beckham, and the Science of Success (HarperCollins, 2010), ISBN 978-0-06-172375-9
- Black Box Thinking: Why Most People Never Learn from Their Mistakes – But Some Do (Portfolio, 2015), ISBN 978-1591848226
- The Greatest: What Sport Teaches Us About Achieving Success (John Murray, 2017), ISBN 978-1473653665
- You Are Awesome: Find Your Confidence and Dare to be Brilliant at (Almost) Anything (John Murray, 2018), ISBN 978-1492687535
- Rebel Ideas: The Power of Diverse Thinking (John Murray, 2019), ISBN 978-1473613942
- Dare to Be You: Defy Self-Doubt, Fearlessly Follow Your Own Path and Be Confidently You! (Hachette Children's Group, 2020), ISBN 978-1526362377
- What Do YOU Think?: How to agree to disagree and still be friends (Hachette Children's Group, 2022), ISBN 978-1526364937

== See also ==
- List of England players at the World Team Table Tennis Championships
