= Sky Andrew =

British table tennis player

Personal information
- Full name: Skylet Andrew
- Nationality: England United Kingdom
- Born: 31 March 1962 (age 64) Upton Park, London, England
- Height: 6 ft 3 in (191 cm)

Sport
- Sport: Table tennis
Medal record
Men's table tennis
Representing England
European Championships
Silver medal – second place	1988 Paris	Team

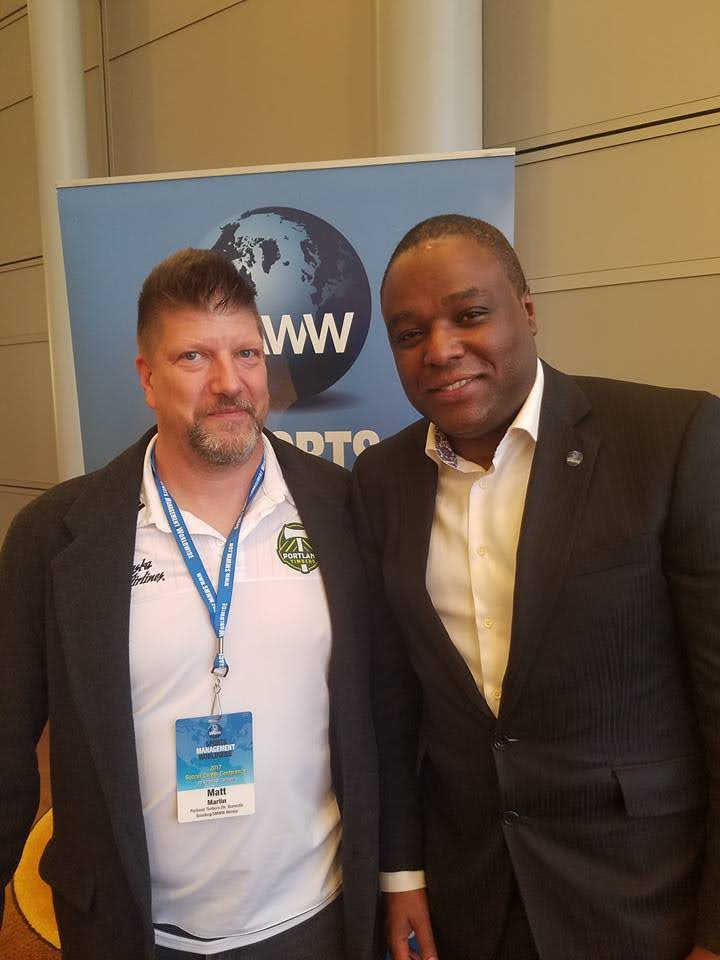
SMWW Soccer conference speakers and Faculty Matt Martin (left) and Sky Andrew (right) in 2020.

Skylet Andrew (born 31 March 1962), often known as Sky Andrew, is an English former Olympian who won three gold medals at the 1989 Commonwealth Table Tennis Championships and was the first Black British sports agent.

== Biography ==
Andrew was born in Upton Park, London, to a London Transport bus driver father, and a mother who worked in an East End pie factory.

=== Table tennis ===
He represented Great Britain at the 1988 Seoul Olympics in the doubles event with Des Douglas and won 3 Commonwealth Table Tennis Championship gold medals in 1989 . Andrew retired from competitive table tennis after the 1994 European Championships.

=== Sports agent ===
While training at Lilleshall Hall in his youth, Andrew met young footballer Sol Campbell, with whom he struck up a friendship.

After retiring from table tennis, Andrew wanted to get into show business, but ended up becoming an agent, representing acting clients including Martine McCutcheon.

In the mid-1990s at Campbell's suggestion, he became the first licensed Black British football agent, engineering Campbell's move from Tottenham Hotspur to Arsenal. Andrew has since represented Jermaine Pennant, David Ginola, Frank Bruno, Jay Bothroyd and Jermain Defoe. His TV and film clients include Nathalie Emmanuel, Sarah-Jane Mee, and Natalie Sawyer.

In September 2016, in a deal with football agency Platinum One Group, Sky Andrew moved his football business across.

Currently he is also a "Soccer Agent" instructor for the online sports-career training school Sports Management Worldwide.

== Honors ==
Andrew won a Barclays Bank "Man of Merit Award" in 2002, and was named the BEA Entrepreneur of The Year in 2003.

== See also ==
- List of England players at the World Team Table Tennis Championships
