= Denis Neale =

British table tennis player

Personal information
- Nationality: England
- Born: 9 December 1944 (age 81) Middlesbrough, England
Medal record
Representing England
World Table Tennis Championships
Bronze medal – third place	1969	Mixed Doubles

Denis Neale is a male former English international table tennis player.

He won a bronze medal at the 1969 World Table Tennis Championships in the mixed doubles with Mary Wright.

He was six times National Singles Champion and also won two English Open titles.

== See also ==
- List of England players at the World Team Table Tennis Championships
- List of World Table Tennis Championships medalists
