= Joanna Drinkhall =

British table tennis player

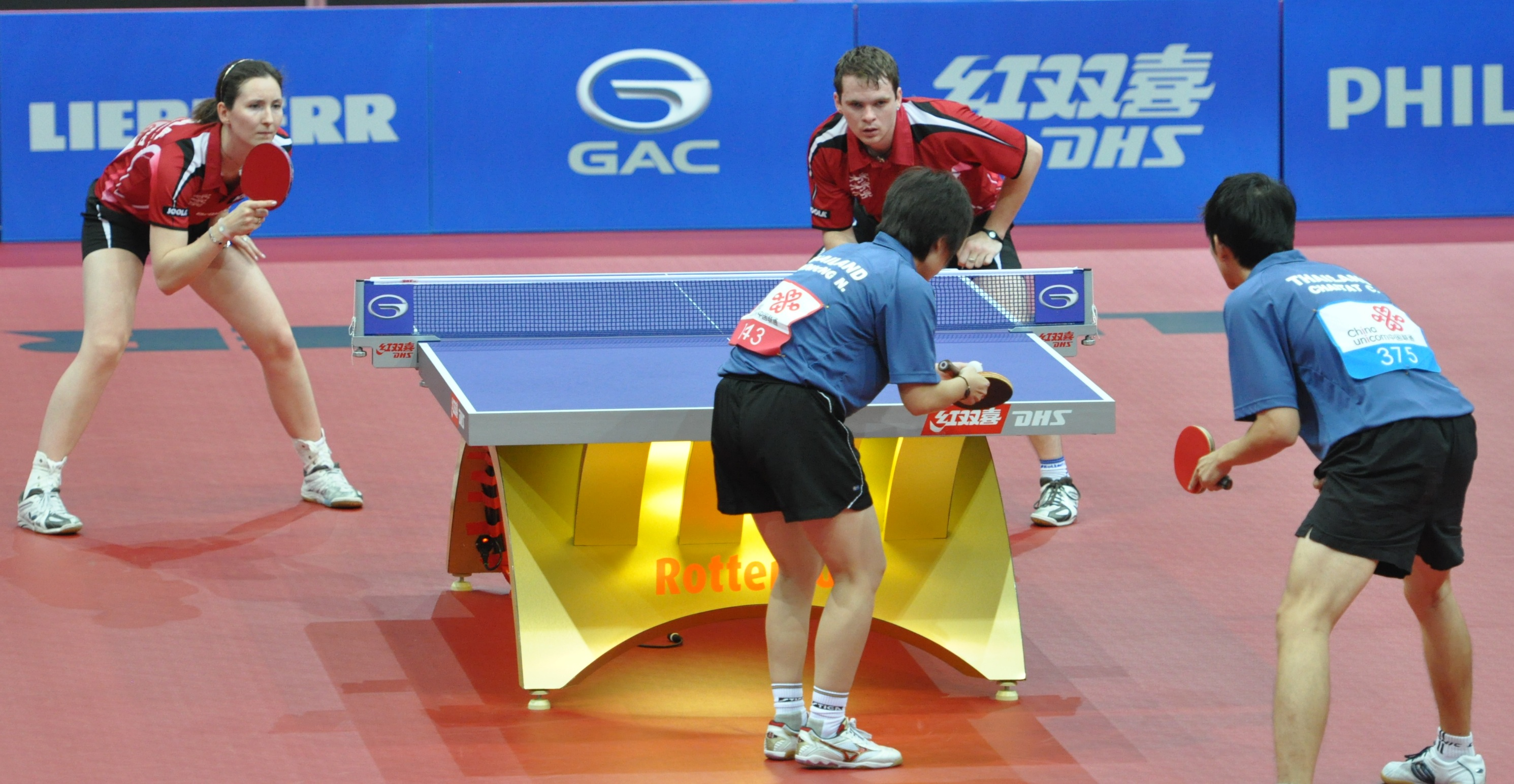
- Joanna Parker and Paul Drinkhall playing in the Mixed Doubles at the 2011 World Table Tennis Championships in Rotterdam

Personal information
- Born: Joanna Kate Parker; 10 June 1987 (age 39) Chertsey, England
- Height: 178 cm (5 ft 10 in)
- Spouse: Paul Drinkhall (m. 2013)

Joanna Kate Drinkhall (née Parker, born 10 June 1987) is a British table tennis player.

== Career ==
She grew up in Chertsey. She trained at the national academy in Nottingham, from 1999 to 2003. Then she played for a Berlin club. She is currently playing in France for TT Saint Quentin.

Joanna has won national singles titles at U12, Cadet, Junior, U21 and Senior levels, girls’ doubles titles at U12, Cadet and Junior and both women's and mixed doubles at the Senior level.

She won a bronze medal at the 2009 Commonwealth Table Tennis Championships in the women's doubles.

She won a bronze medal at the 2010 Commonwealth Games in the mixed doubles with Paul Drinkhall. This was the first Commonwealth table tennis medal won by an English woman.

She competed for Great Britain at the 2012 Summer Olympics. In Women's singles, in round 1, she defeated Caroline Kumahara, but in the second round, she lost to Kristin Silbereisen. In Women's team, the team lost to Korea in their first match.

In June 2014, she was ranked No. 1 in England and 109th in the world.

Joanna and Paul Drinkhall won gold in the mixed doubles competition at the 2014 Commonwealth Games in Glasgow, defeating fellow English pairing Liam Pitchford and Tin-Tin Ho in the final.

== Personal life ==
Parker married Paul Drinkhall, a British table tennis player, in August 2013.

== See also ==
- List of England players at the World Team Table Tennis Championships
