= Ian Harrison (table tennis) =

British table tennis player

Personal information
- Nationality: England
- Born: 28 June 1939 (age 86) Tunbridge Wells, England

Ian Harrison is a male former international table tennis player from England.

== Table tennis career ==
He began playing table tennis at the age of 12 after asking for a table tennis set for Christmas, and soon after joined Cheltenham Spa T.T.C. Only a few years later, aged 15 he won the English Open Junior Boys Singles. That same season he was picked to play for England for the first time, in a friendly match against France.

The following year, 1957, he was picked for the higher level Swaythling Cup team to play at the World Championship in Stockholm. He competed at the World Table Tennis Championships, in the Swaythling Cup at six consecutive tournaments from 1957 to 1967.

In 1960 he won the English Open, the first English born men's winner for 36 years. That year Harrison also won the English Closed title, becoming the first player to win both the "Open" and "Closed" singles titles.

Throughout his career Harrison had some notable international victories, including against Ichiro Ogimura from Japan in the World Championships of 1961 and three times World Champion, China’s Chuang Tse-Tung (Zhuang Zedong).

In 1959 a major change in table tennis came in the form of new bat technology: from pimpled rubber to sandwich rubber. This new material enabled more, sometimes excessive, spin to be used and completely changed the game, greatly favoring more attacking styles. Harrison who had excelled as a defensive player tried hard to adapt but never fully succeeded in making the change. In addition, an increasingly busy personal life (he now had a young son) meant he wasn't able to put in the required practice and so Ian Harrison decided, whilst still at the top, to retire from table tennis saying "'Why did you retire? is a much nicer question than 'Why don't you retire?'"

Despite the issue of the game change, Harrison remained in the English team for another six years and won the English Closed Singles one more time in 1967. He won the English Closed Men's Doubles five times in 1960, 1965, 1966, 1967 and 1968. He also won at mixed doubles, once in the English Open (1960) and once in the English Closed (1964).

Before he retired it was well recognized that Harrison had dominated English table tennis for years. Harrison was, and still is, the only player ever to have won all three of the English Open Men's singles, Junior Boys and the English Closed Men's singles. Throughout his entire career from 1957 to 1967 he played each year for England in every major championship: The World Table Tennis Championships and the Europeans. In total he played 178 times for England, won eight English National Table Tennis Championships, won over 100 Open titles around the world, and was England number one for 7 years.

== See also ==
- List of England players at the World Team Table Tennis Championships
- English National Table Tennis Championships
- English Open (table tennis)
- Table Tennis England
