= Desmond Douglas =

British table tennis player

Desmond Douglas MBE
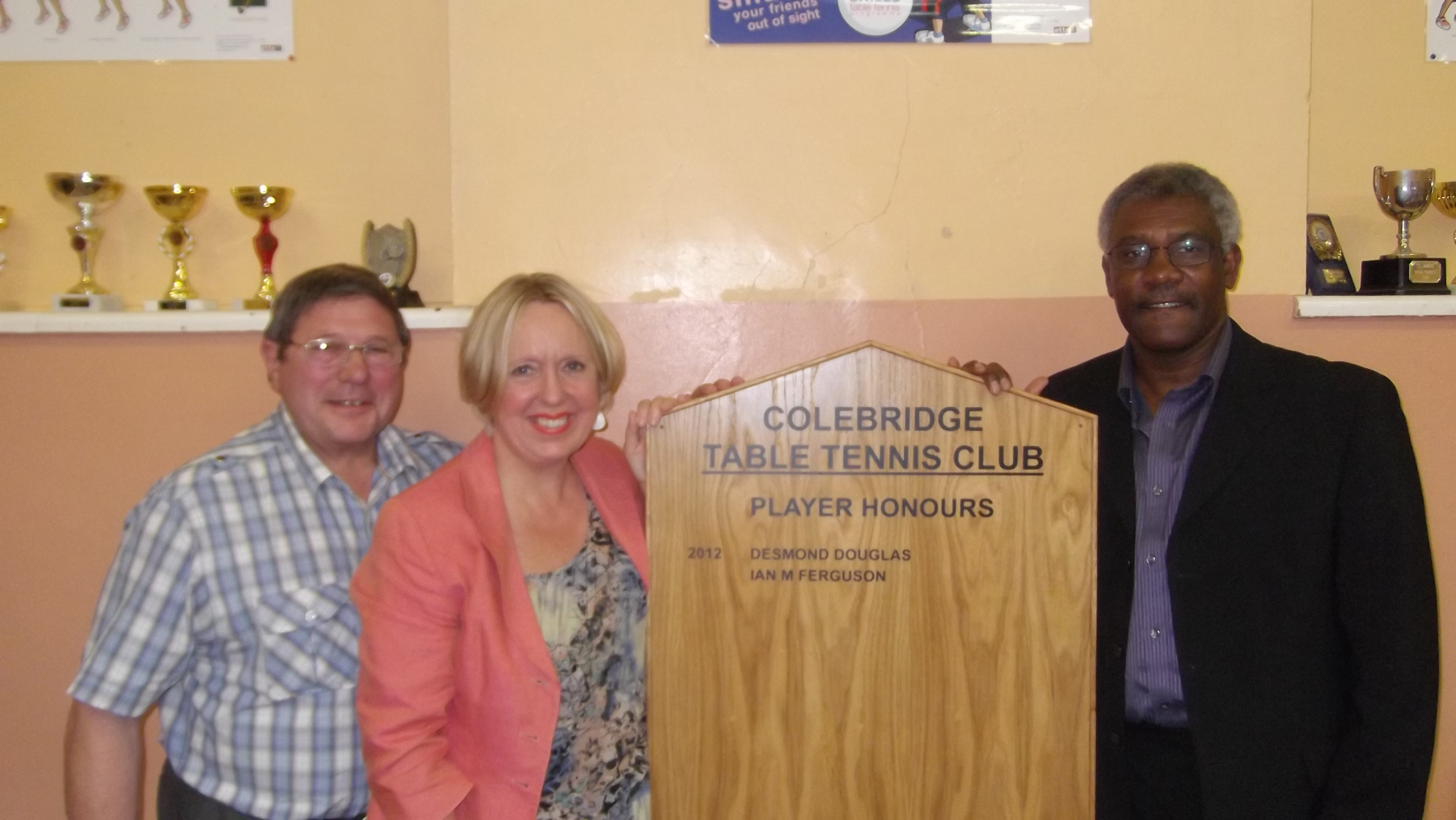
- Douglas (right) in 2013

Personal information
- Nationality: English; British
- Born: 20 July 1955 (age 71) Jamaica

Sport
- Sport: Table tennis
Medal record
Men's table tennis
Representing England
World Cup
Bronze medal – third place	1990 Chiba City	Team
European Championships
Silver medal – second place	1978 Duisburg	Team
Silver medal – second place	1980 Berne	Mixed Doubles
Silver medal – second place	1988 Paris	Team
Bronze medal – third place	1978 Duisburg	Singles

Desmond Douglas MBE (born 20 July 1955 in Jamaica) is a British table tennis player. He lived and was brought up in the area of Handsworth, Birmingham, West Midlands. He was an attacking, left-handed, player, notable for his scissor jump smash. He was famous for his use of close to the table blocks on the backhand side, mixing pace with powerful topspin from his forehand side.

Douglas was 11 times English Table Tennis champion, who peaked at equal World No. 7 and European No. 3. He represented Great Britain at the 1988 Seoul Olympics, in both the singles and the doubles, where he was partnered by Sky Andrew. Douglas played professionally in The West German Bundesliga for eight years, between 1977 and 1985.

Douglas is still actively involved in table tennis, coaching throughout the country, including training some of the top young British prospects at the Youth Development Squad. He also coaches at Sutton Coldfield College and Woodfield Table Tennis Club, Wolverhampton, Albrighton table tennis club, Albrighton

Douglas was appointed Member of the Order of the British Empire (MBE) in the 1987 Birthday Honours, for services to table tennis. He lives in Walsall, West Midlands.

== See also ==
- List of England players at the World Team Table Tennis Championships
- List of table tennis players
