= Trevor Taylor (table tennis) =

British table tennis player

Personal information
- Nationality: England

Trevor Taylor is a male former international table tennis player from England.

== Table tennis career ==
He represented England at four World Table Tennis Championships in the Swaythling Cup (men's team event) from 1969-1975.

He won four English National Table Tennis Championships - twice singles champion titles and represented Hertfordshire at county level and Ormesby at club level. Won Commonwealth Singles Championship 3 times: 1971/1973/1975. Won eight gold medals at Commonwealth Championships. European Club Champion with Ormesby; the only time an English Club has been successful.

Retired from international table tennis at 22.

Highest World Ranking: 20

== Personal life ==
His brother Peter Taylor was also an international player.

Married to Karen 1977-

2 daughters Lois and Lana (Miss England Intercontinental 2023)

== See also ==
- List of England players at the World Team Table Tennis Championships
