= Carl Prean =

English table tennis player

Personal information
- Nationality: England
- Born: 20 August 1967 (age 58) Ryde, Isle of Wight

Sport
- Sport: Table tennis
Medal record
Men's table tennis
Representing England
European Championships
Silver medal – second place	1988 Paris	Team
Silver medal – second place	1992 Stuttgart	Team

Carl Lustig Prean (born 20 August 1967 in Ryde, Isle of Wight) is a former international table tennis player. He competed at the three Olympic Games.

== Table tennis career ==
He is former England senior no.1 table tennis player, a feat he first achieved when he was only 15. He is a three time English Men's Champion and won the European Youth Championships (Under 17 age group) in 1985 and (Under 14) in 1982. He is a winner of both the prestigious Belgian and Brazilian Opens, and represented Great Britain at three Olympics (Seoul, Barcelona and Atlanta).

At the Barcelona Olympics in 1992, Prean progressed from his group in first place following victories against Baboor (India), Casares (ESP) and Choi (PRK). In the last 16, Prean faced eventual winner Jan-Ove Waldner losing out 3 sets to nil.

Prean was known for his unorthodox style using combination bats and his strong forehand topspin.

He spent the majority of his career playing professionally in the German Bundesliga.

== Material and playing style ==
Prean was sponsored by Juic. So he played a juic offensive blade with a driva smash rubber 2,5 mm on the forehand and a juic leggy long pimples rubber 1,5 mm on the backhand. He turned the bat while playing and so changes speed and spin of the ball suddenly. On passive returns he smashed with his very good forehand and controlled the match.

== See also ==
- List of England players at the World Team Table Tennis Championships
- List of World Table Tennis Championships medalists
