= Mary Shannon =

English table tennis player

Mary Shannon (Wright)
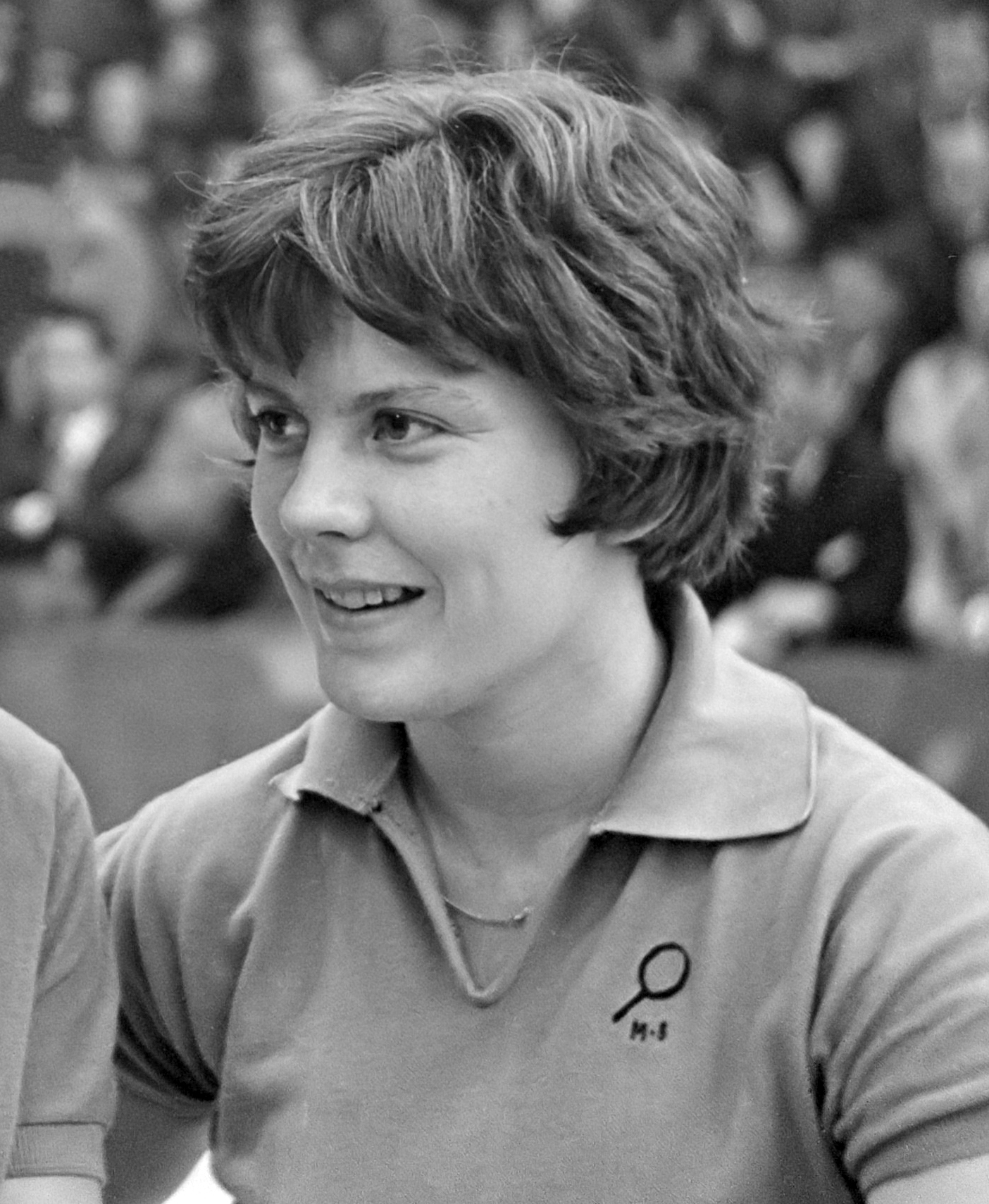
- Mary Shannon in 1963

Personal information
- Nationality: United Kingdom
- Born: 12 February 1944 (age 82)

Sport
- Sport: Table tennis
Medal record
Table tennis
Representing United Kingdom
World Championships
Bronze medal – third place	1969 Munich	Mixed doubles
Bronze medal – third place	1965 Hala Tivoli	Team
Silver medal – second place	1963 Prague	Doubles
European Championships
Bronze medal – third place	1970 Moscow	Mixed doubles
Bronze medal – third place	1968 Lyon	Singles
Bronze medal – third place	1968 Lyon	Doubles
Bronze medal – third place	1968 Lyon	Mixed doubles
Bronze medal – third place	1966 London	Doubles
Silver medal – second place	1966 London	Mixed doubles
Gold medal – first place	1964 Malmo	Doubles
Gold medal – first place	1964 Malmo	Team
Gold medal – first place	1962 Berlin	Doubles
Silver medal – second place	1962 Berlin	Team

Mary Shannon (married name Mary Wright), (born 12 February 1944) is a retired English table tennis player.

== Table tennis career ==
She won several medals at the world and European championships between 1962 and 1970, including three gold medals in 1962–1964.

She also won seven English Open titles.

== Personal life ==
Shannon worked as a radiographer. On 4 September 1965, she married Brian Wright, her frequent partner in mixed doubles competitions. They had three children.

== See also ==
- List of England players at the World Team Table Tennis Championships
