= Jill Parker-Hammersley-Shirley =

British table tennis player

Personal information
- Full name: Jill Shirley-Parker
- Nationality: England
- Born: 6 December 1951 (age 74)

Sport
- Sport: Table tennis
Medal record
Women's table tennis
Representing England
World Championships
Bronze medal – third place	1973 Sarajevo	Doubles
European Championships
Silver medal – second place	1982 Budapest	Singles
Bronze medal – third place	1982 Budapest	Doubles
Bronze medal – third place	1980 Berne	Doubles
Silver medal – second place	1978 Duisburg	Singles
Gold medal – first place	1976 Prague	Singles
Gold medal – first place	1976 Prague	Doubles
Silver medal – second place	1976 Prague	Team
Silver medal – second place	1972 Rotterdam	Doubles

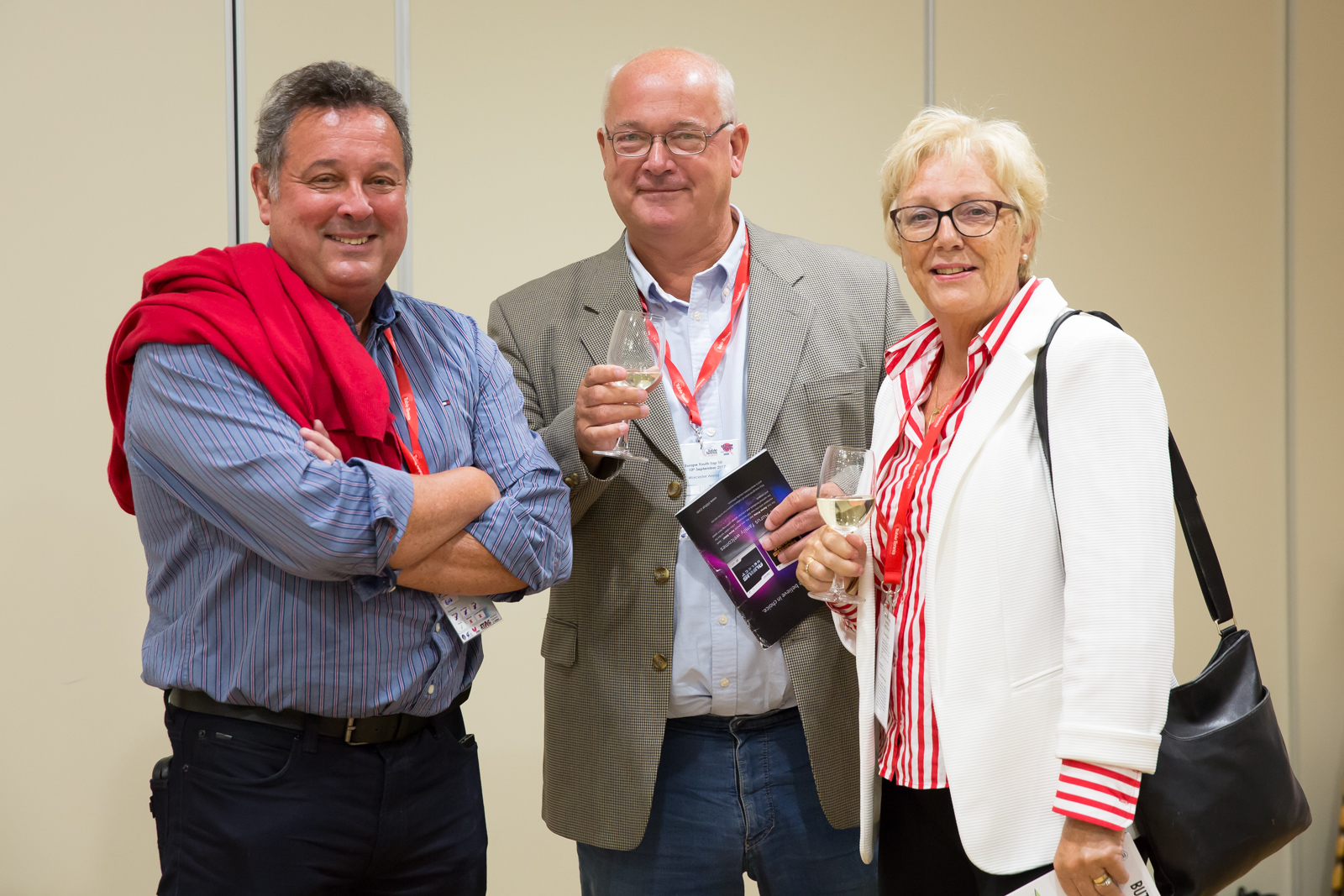
Jill Hammersley-Parker with former England internationals Nicky Jarvis (left) and husband Donald Parker (centre)

Jill Parker-Hammersley-Shirley (born 1951) is a former female table tennis player from England.

== Table tennis ==
From 1972 to 1982 she won several medals in singles, doubles, and team events in the Table Tennis European Championships and in the World Table Tennis Championships She was ranked number one in England during the early 1970s.

She also won four English Open titles.

== Personal life ==
She changed her name from Jill Shirley to Jill Hammersley after marrying Nicky Hammersley on 3 July 1970. She later married fellow England international Donald Parker and they had two children. Their daughter Katy Parker represented England at the 2002 Commonwealth Games in the table tennis mixed doubles and their son Adam was a semi-professional cricketer.

== See also ==
- List of table tennis players
- List of England players at the World Team Table Tennis Championships
