= Japan Open (table tennis) =

Tournament information
- Tour: ITTF World Tour
- Sponsor: LION (from 2017)
- Founded: 1989
- Location: Kitakyushu (2018)
- Venue: Kitakyushu City General Gymnasium (2018)
- Category: World Tour
- Draw: 32S / 16D
- Prize money: US$170,000 (2018)

Current champions (2018)
- Men's singles: (Japan) Tomokazu Harimoto
- Women's singles: (Japan) Mima Ito
- Men's doubles: (South Korea) Jung Young-sik (South Korea) Lee Sang-su
- Women's doubles: (China) Gu Yuting (China) Mu Zi

The Japan Open was an annual table tennis tournament in Japan, run by the International Table Tennis Federation (ITTF). It was part of the ITTF World Tour.

== History ==
The tournament was first held in 1989, and was featured on the ITTF World Tour's schedule every year since the Tour's inception in 1996.

Sweden's Jan-Ove Waldner and Germany's Timo Boll jointly hold the record for most men's singles tournament wins, with three each, while Wang Nan of China holds the record for most women's singles tournament wins, with four.

In August 2016, it was announced by the ITTF that Tokyo has been chosen as one of six cities to host a "World Tour Platinum" event in 2017. These events will replace the Super Series as the top tier of the ITTF World Tour.

== Champions ==
=== Individual Events ===
==== 1989–2017 ====
| Year | Men's singles | Women's singles | Men's doubles | Women's doubles |
|---|---|---|---|---|
| 1989 | (China) Ma Wenge | (Hong Kong) Chan Tan Lui | (Japan) Kiyoshi Saito (Japan) Yuji Matsushita | (China) Hu Xiaoxin (China) Qiao Hong |
| 1990 | (Sweden) Jan-Ove Waldner | (China) Chen Zihe | (Sweden) Erik Lindh (Sweden) Jörgen Persson | (China) Ding Yaping (China) Li Jun |
| 1991 | (Sweden) Jan-Ove Waldner | (China) Deng Yaping | (China) Wang Yonggan (China) Yu Shentong | (China) Deng Yaping (China) Qiao Hong |
| 1992 | (China) Wang Tao | (China) Deng Yaping | (China) Ma Wenge (China) Yu Shentong | (South Korea) Hong Cha-ok (South Korea) Hyun Jung-hwa |
| 1993 | (China) Wang Tao | (Hong Kong) Chai Po Wa | (China) Lü Lin (China) Wang Tao | (South Korea) Kim Boon-sik (South Korea) Park Hae-jung |
| 1994 | (Canada) Wenguan Johnny Huang | (China) Tang Weiyi | | |
| 1995 | (China) Ding Song | (South Korea) Park Hae-jung | | |
| 1996 | (China) Ding Song | (China) Qiao Hong | (South Korea) Kang Hee-chan (South Korea) Kim Taek-soo | (South Korea) Park Hae-jung (South Korea) Ryu Ji-hae |
| 1997 | (Sweden) Jan-Ove Waldner | (China) Wang Chen | (China) Wang Liqin (China) Yan Sen | (South Korea) Lee Eun-sil (South Korea) Ryu Ji-hae |
| 1998 | (China) Kong Linghui | (China) Li Ju | (China) Ma Lin (China) Wang Tao | (China) Li Ju (China) Wang Nan |
| 1999 | (Belarus) Vladimir Samsonov | (China) Wang Nan | (China) Ma Lin (China) Qin Zhijian | (China) Sun Jin (China) Yang Ying |
| 2000 | (China) Wang Liqin | (China) Wang Nan | (China) Kong Linghui (China) Liu Guoliang | (China) Sun Jin (China) Yang Ying |
| 2001 | (Chinese Taipei) Chiang Peng-lung | (China) Wang Nan | (China) Ma Lin (China) Wang Hao | (South Korea) Kim Bok-rae (South Korea) Kim Kyung-ah |
| 2002 | (Greece) Kalinikos Kreanga | (South Korea) Kim Kyung-ah | (Japan) Akira Kito (Japan) Toshio Tasaki | (Singapore) Jing Junhong (Singapore) Li Jiawei |
| 2003 | (Germany) Timo Boll | (China) Guo Yue | (China) Chen Qi (China) Ma Lin | (China) Guo Yue (China) Niu Jianfeng |
| 2004 | (China) Chen Qi | (China) Zhang Yining | (China) Wang Liqin (China) Yan Sen | (China) Guo Yue (China) Niu Jianfeng |
| 2005 | (Germany) Timo Boll | (China) Zhang Yining | (Germany) Timo Boll (Germany) Christian Süß | (China) Bai Yang (China) Cao Zhen |
| 2006 | (China) Wang Liqin | (Singapore) Wang Yuegu | (China) Ma Lin (China) Wang Hao | (Hong Kong) Tie Ya Na (Hong Kong) Zhang Rui |
| 2007 | (China) Wang Hao | (China) Wang Nan | (China) Chen Qi (China) Wang Liqin | (China) Guo Yue (China) Li Xiaoxia |
| 2008 | (China) Ma Lin | (China) Zhang Yining | | |
| 2009 | (South Korea) Oh Sang-eun | (South Korea) Park Mi-young | (Japan) Seiya Kishikawa (Japan) Jun Mizutani | (Japan) Sayaka Hirano (Japan) Reiko Hiura |
| 2010 | (Germany) Timo Boll | (Singapore) Wang Yuegu | (Japan) Kenta Matsudaira (Japan) Koki Niwa | (Japan) Yuka Ishigaki (Japan) Yuri Yamanashi |
| 2011 | (Japan) Seiya Kishikawa | (Singapore) Feng Tianwei | (China) Lin Gaoyuan (China) Wu Jiaji | (Japan) Hiroko Fujii (Japan) Misako Wakamiya |
| 2012 | (Japan) Jun Mizutani | (Spain) Shen Yanfei | (South Korea) Kim Min-seok (South Korea) Seo Hyun-deok | (Japan) Hiroko Fujii (Japan) Misako Wakamiya |
| 2013 | (Japan) Masato Shiono | (Japan) Ai Fukuhara | (Japan) Jin Ueda (Japan) Maharu Yoshimura | (China) Gu Yuting (China) Zhou Xintong |
| 2014 | (China) Yu Ziyang | (Singapore) Feng Tianwei | (Japan) Seiya Kishikawa (Japan) Jun Mizutani | (Japan) Ai Fukuhara (Japan) Misako Wakamiya |
| 2015 | (China) Xu Xin | (China) Chen Meng | (China) Ma Long (China) Xu Xin | (China) Liu Fei (China) Wu Yang |
| 2016 | (China) Fan Zhendong | (China) Liu Shiwen | (China) Ma Long (China) Xu Xin | (China) Ding Ning (China) Li Xiaoxia |
| 2017 | (China) Ma Long | (China) Sun Yingsha | (China) Ma Long (China) Xu Xin | (China) Chen Xingtong (China) Sun Yingsha |

==== 2018–present ====
| Year | Men's singles | Women's singles | Men's doubles | Women's doubles | Mixed doubles |
|---|---|---|---|---|---|
| 2018 | (Japan) Tomokazu Harimoto | (Japan) Mima Ito | (South Korea) Jung Young-sik (South Korea) Lee Sang-su | (China) Gu Yuting (China) Mu Zi | (China) Liang Jingkun (China) Chen Xingtong |
| 2019 | (China) Xu Xin | (China) Sun Yingsha | (China) Fan Zhendong (China) Xu Xin | (China) Chen Meng (China) Liu Shiwen | (China) Xu Xin (China) Zhu Yuling |

=== Team Events ===
| Year | Men's Team | Women's Team |
|---|---|---|
| 1989 | Czechoslovakia | China |
| 1990 | Sweden | China |
| 1991 | Sweden | China |
| 1992 | China | China |
| 1994 | China | China |
| 1995 | South Korea | South Korea |
| 2008 | China | China |

== See also ==
- Asian Table Tennis Union
