= Table Tennis World Cup =

Annual table tennis tournament

ITTF World Cup
- Status: Active
- Genre: World Cup
- Frequency: Singles: every year Mixed team: every year
- Location: Various
- Inaugurated: 1980
- Organiser: ITTF
- Website: ITTF

The Table Tennis World Cup has been held annually since 1980. There had only been men's singles until the start of women's singles in 1996 and team competitions in 1990. The competitions are sanctioned by the International Table Tennis Federation.

In the years 2021–2023, the event was suspended. A new WTT event, WTT Cup Finals, began in 2021, which is the season-ending championship of the WTT. WTT stated that the winners of the WTT Cup Finals would win the prestigious ITTF World Cup trophies in March 2021, but the winners have been actually presented with WTT Cup Finals specific trophies since the inaugural edition, and the event has been renamed to simply WTT Finals since 2023, making it a pure season-ending event.

ITTF World Cup returned with an innovative mixed team format in 2023 in Chengdu, and ITTF Singles World Cup returned in 2024, in Macao, China.

== Competitions ==
=== Men's and women's world cups ===
For 2024 singles world cup, participants of the competition composed of:

- The World Champion.
- The U19 World Champion.
- The top 4 player from each of the 5 continents' (Africa, Asia, Europe, Americas and Oceania) Continental Cup. If a continent does not have this tournament scheduled in 2024 prior to the World Cup, player selection will be based on the World Ranking.
- 24 additional players shall be selected from the World Ranking.
- There shall be no more 4 players from an association, except an association with players qualified from items World Champion and U19 World Champion may compete with up to 6 players.

For previous editions, participants of the competition are composed of:

- The current holder of the World Cup.
- The World Champion.
- The champion player or the strongest current player from each of the 6 continents (Africa, Asia, Europe, Latin America, North America and Oceania).
- 1 player from the host association.
- The top 8 players from the world ranking list.
- 2 wild card selections.
  - No more than 2 players from an association unless a third is invited as a wild card.
  - If the World Champion and the World Cup title holder is the same player, or the host association has a player qualified as title holder or from the world ranking, the vacancy goes to the next highest eligible player on the world ranking list.

=== Team World Cup ===
- Top 7 associations at the preceding World Team Championships.
- If the team of the host association is not on the top 7 list, the team of the host association and 4 teams from continental federations would be represented at the event.

=== Mixed Team World Cup ===
- 16 teams comprising a minimum of three and maximum of four players per gender.
- Each team shall be accompanied by a non-playing coach.
- Maximum 10 teams, the winners of either the men's or women's competitions at the last continental team championship.
- 1 host team if not already qualified.
- Minimum of 7 teams will be determined based on the qualification and seeding list.

== Playing system ==
=== Men's and women's world cups ===
The 2024 World Cup was divided into 2 stages:

1. The 1st stage, Group stage: The 48 players are divided into 16 equal groups, with all the members of a group playing each other, and the group winners advance towards the 2nd stage.
  1. The highest-ranked player will be placed in Group 1, the 2nd highest in Group 2, the 3rd highest in Group 3 and the 4th highest in Group 4; the remaining players will be drawn into the other groups using a modified snake system 4 at a time in ranking order. Players from the same association will be drawn into separate groups.
  2. Matches of 1st stage shall be 4 games (result 4-0, 3-1 or 2-2). Final ranking will be determined in terms of Regulation 3.7.5, excluding match points, and based solely on the ratios of wins to losses first in games and then points, as far as is necessary to resolve the order.
2. The 2nd Stage- Knockout:
  1. The draw for players will be as follows:
    1. First-place finisher of Group 1 will be placed in position 1.
    2. First-place finisher of Group 2 will be placed in position 16.
    3. First-place finishers of Groups 3 and 4 will be drawn into positions 8 and 9.
    4. First-place finishers of Groups 5 to 16 will be drawn randomly into the remaining positions.
  2. Matches of stage 2 shall be the best of 7 games.

=== Mixed Team World Cup ===
There will be a total of 56 matches (32 in Stage 1 + 24 in Stage 2). In stage 1 the teams will be divided into 4 groups (2 groups of 4 and 2 groups of 5), with all the members of a group playing each other.

For stage 1, the highest-ranked team will be placed in Group 1, the 2nd highest in Group 2, the 3rd highest in Group 3 and the 4th highest in Group 4; the remaining teams will be drawn into the groups 2 at a time in seeding order, with the exception teams 17 and 18 will be drawn into groups 3 and 4.

In stage 2, the group winners and runners-up from Stage 1 will compete in a single group with all the members of a group playing each other, with the exception that teams having played each other in stage 1 will not play again, but the results will carry forward.

== Former playing system ==
=== Men's and Women's World Cups ===
The playing system is determined by the executive committee on recommendation by the competition department. The 2009 World Cup was divided into 3 stages. All matches were the best of 7 games.

1. The preliminary stage, Intercontinental Cup: The 4 continental representatives from Africa, Latin America, North America and Oceania compete on a group basis. The winner joins the remaining 15 players in the 1st stage.
2. The 1st stage, Group stage: The 16 players are divided into 4 equal groups, with all the members of a group playing each other, and the group winners and runners-up advance towards the 2nd stage.
  1. The highest-ranked player is placed in Group A, the 2nd highest in Group B, the 3rd highest in Group C and the 4th highest in Group D. The remaining players are drawn into the 4 groups at a time in ranking order.
  2. If there are 2 players from the same association, they will be drawn into separate groups, but the 3rd player from the same association may be drawn into any group.
3. The 2nd stage, Knockout:
  1. Quarter-finals: 4 quarter finals (Q1-Q4) are arranged according to both the groups and the rankings in the 1st stage. Q1-Q4 are as follows: A1 vs. B2, C1 vs. D2, D1 vs. C2, and B1 vs. A2.
  2. Semi-finals: the matches are winner of Q1 vs. winner of Q2, and winner of Q3 vs. winner of Q4.
  3. Winners of semi-finals enter the final, with the losers competing for the third place.

=== Team World Cup ===
All team matches are played as the Olympic system with a maximum of 4 singles and 1 doubles. All individual matches of a team match are the best of 5 games.

1. Intercontinental Cup: The 4 teams from continental federations not qualified by their ranking at the preceding World Team Championships shall compete in an Intercontinental Cup played in round-robin.
2. Knockout: 7 teams qualified from World Team Championships and the host are seeded, based on latest ITTF World Team Ranking. The winner of the Intercontinental Cup play a match against the lowest seeded of the other 8 teams, other than the host association's team. The winner of this match shall promote to final knockout. The top 4 seeds are separated in different matches in quarter-finals.

== Winners ==
=== Men's singles ===
Year	Host city	Gold	Silver	Bronze
1980	Hong Kong	(China) Guo Yuehua	(China) Li Zhenshi	(Czechoslovakia) Josef Dvoracek
1981	Kuala Lumpur	(Hungary) Tibor Klampár	(China) Xie Saike	(China) Guo Yuehua
1982	Hong Kong	(China) Guo Yuehua	(Sweden) Mikael Appelgren	(China) Xie Saike
1983	Barbados	(Sweden) Mikael Appelgren	(Sweden) Jan-Ove Waldner	(Sweden) Erik Lindh
1984	Kuala Lumpur	(China) Jiang Jialiang	(South Korea) Kim Wan	(Sweden) Ulf Bengtsson
1985	Foshan	(China) Chen Xinhua	(Poland) Andrzej Grubba	(China) Jiang Jialiang
1986	Port of Spain	(China) Chen Longcan	(China) Jiang Jialiang	(South Korea) Kim Wan
1987	Macao	(China) Teng Yi	(China) Jiang Jialiang	(Poland) Andrzej Grubba
1988	Guangzhou & Wuhan	(Poland) Andrzej Grubba	(China) Chen Longcan	(China) Jiang Jialiang
1989	Nairobi	(China) Ma Wenge	(Poland) Andrzej Grubba	(Sweden) Mikael Appelgren
1990	Chiba	(Sweden) Jan-Ove Waldner	(China) Ma Wenge	(China) Chen Longcan
1991	Kuala Lumpur	(Sweden) Jörgen Persson	(France) Jean-Philippe Gatien	(Sweden) Jan-Ove Waldner
1992	Ho Chi Minh City	(China) Ma Wenge	(South Korea) Kim Taek-soo	(South Korea) Yoo Nam-kyu
1993	Guangzhou	(Croatia) Zoran Primorac	(China) Wang Tao	(Canada) Wenguan Johnny Huang
1994	Taipei	(France) Jean-Philippe Gatien	(Belgium) Jean-Michel Saive	(Croatia) Zoran Primorac
1995	Nimes	(China) Kong Linghui	(Germany) Jörg Roßkopf	(China) Liu Guoliang
1996	Nimes	(China) Liu Guoliang	(Sweden) Jan-Ove Waldner	(Belarus) Vladimir Samsonov
1997	Nimes	(Croatia) Zoran Primorac	(China) Kong Linghui	(Belarus) Vladimir Samsonov
1998	Shantou	(Germany) Jörg Roßkopf	(South Korea) Kim Taek-soo	(Croatia) Zoran Primorac
1999	Xiaolan	(Belarus) Vladimir Samsonov	(Austria) Werner Schlager	(Croatia) Zoran Primorac
2000	Yangzhou	(China) Ma Lin	(South Korea) Kim Taek-soo	(China) Wang Liqin
2001	Courmayeur	(Belarus) Vladimir Samsonov	(China) Wang Liqin	(Germany) Jörg Roßkopf
2002	Jinan	(Germany) Timo Boll	(China) Kong Linghui	(Croatia) Zoran Primorac
2003	Jiangyin	(China) Ma Lin	(Greece) Kalinikos Kreanga	(China) Wang Liqin
2004	Hangzhou	(China) Ma Lin	(Greece) Kalinikos Kreanga	(China) Wang Hao
2005	Liège	(Germany) Timo Boll	(China) Wang Hao	(China) Ma Lin
2006	Paris	(China) Ma Lin	(China) Wang Hao	(China) Wang Liqin
2007	Barcelona	(China) Wang Hao	(South Korea) Ryu Seung-min	(China) Wang Liqin
2008	Liège	(China) Wang Hao	(Germany) Timo Boll	(China) Ma Long
2009	Moscow	(Belarus) Vladimir Samsonov	(China) Chen Qi	(China) Ma Long
2010	Magdeburg	(China) Wang Hao	(China) Zhang Jike	(Germany) Timo Boll
2011	Paris	(China) Zhang Jike	(China) Wang Hao	(South Korea) Joo Se-hyuk
2012	Liverpool	(China) Ma Long	(Germany) Timo Boll	(Belarus) Vladimir Samsonov
2013	Verviers	(China) Xu Xin	(Belarus) Vladimir Samsonov	(Germany) Dimitrij Ovtcharov
2014	Düsseldorf	(China) Zhang Jike	(China) Ma Long	(Germany) Timo Boll
2015	Halmstad	(China) Ma Long	(China) Fan Zhendong	(Germany) Dimitrij Ovtcharov
2016	Saarbrücken	(China) Fan Zhendong	(China) Xu Xin	(Hong Kong) Wong Chun-ting
2017	Liège	(Germany) Dimitrij Ovtcharov	(Germany) Timo Boll	(China) Ma Long
2018	Paris	(China) Fan Zhendong	(Germany) Timo Boll	(China) Lin Gaoyuan
2019	Chengdu	(China) Fan Zhendong	(Japan) Tomokazu Harimoto	(Chinese Taipei) Lin Yun-ju
2020	Weihai	(China) Fan Zhendong	(China) Ma Long	(Japan) Tomokazu Harimoto
2024	Macau	(China) Ma Long	(China) Lin Gaoyuan	(Japan) Tomokazu Harimoto
2024	Macau	(China) Ma Long	(China) Lin Gaoyuan	(China) Wang Chuqin
2025	Macau	(Brazil) Hugo Calderano	(China) Lin Shidong	(China) Liang Jingkun
2025	Macau	(Brazil) Hugo Calderano	(China) Lin Shidong	(China) Wang Chuqin
2026	Macau	(China) Wang Chuqin	(Japan) Sora Matsushima	(Brazil) Hugo Calderano
2026	Macau	(China) Wang Chuqin	(Japan) Sora Matsushima	(Chinese Taipei) Lin Yun-ju

=== Women's singles ===
Year	Host city	Gold	Silver	Bronze
1996	Hong Kong	(China) Deng Yaping	(China) Yang Ying	(China) Wang Chen
1997	Shanghai	(China) Wang Nan	(China) Li Ju	(New Zealand) Li Chunli
1998	Taipei	(China) Wang Nan	(China) Li Ju	(Chinese Taipei) Chen-Tong Fei-Ming
2000	Phnom Penh	(China) Li Ju	(China) Wang Nan	(China) Sun Jin
2001	Wuhu	(China) Zhang Yining	(North Korea) Kim Hyon-hui	(Romania) Mihaela Steff
2002	Singapore	(China) Zhang Yining	(China) Li Nan	(Hong Kong) Tie Ya Na
2003	Hong Kong	(China) Wang Nan	(China) Niu Jianfeng	(China) Zhang Yining
2004	Hangzhou	(China) Zhang Yining	(China) Wang Nan	(Hong Kong) Tie Ya Na
2005	Guangzhou	(China) Zhang Yining	(China) Guo Yan	(Japan) Ai Fukuhara
2006	Urumqi	(China) Guo Yan	(China) Zhang Yining	(Singapore) Li Jiawei
2007	Chengdu	(China) Wang Nan	(China) Zhang Yining	(China) Guo Yue
2008	Kuala Lumpur	(China) Li Xiaoxia	(Hong Kong) Tie Ya Na	(Singapore) Feng Tianwei
2009	Guangzhou	(China) Liu Shiwen	(China) Guo Yue	(China) Li Xiaoxia
2010	Kuala Lumpur	(China) Guo Yan	(Hong Kong) Jiang Huajun	(China) Guo Yue
2011	Singapore	(China) Ding Ning	(China) Li Xiaoxia	(Hong Kong) Tie Ya Na
2012	Huangshi	(China) Liu Shiwen	(Romania) Elizabeta Samara	(Spain) Shen Yanfei
2013	Kobe	(China) Liu Shiwen	(China) Wu Yang	(Singapore) Feng Tianwei
2014	Linz	(China) Ding Ning	(China) Li Xiaoxia	(Japan) Kasumi Ishikawa
2015	Sendai	(China) Liu Shiwen	(Japan) Kasumi Ishikawa	(Germany) Petrissa Solja
2016	Philadelphia	(Japan) Miu Hirano	(Chinese Taipei) Cheng I-ching	(Singapore) Feng Tianwei
2017	Markham	(China) Zhu Yuling	(China) Liu Shiwen	(Chinese Taipei) Cheng I-ching
2018	Chengdu	(China) Ding Ning	(China) Zhu Yuling	(Chinese Taipei) Cheng I-ching
2019	Chengdu	(China) Liu Shiwen	(China) Zhu Yuling	(Singapore) Feng Tianwei
2020	Weihai	(China) Chen Meng	(China) Sun Yingsha	(Japan) Mima Ito
2024	Macau	(China) Sun Yingsha	(China) Wang Manyu	(China) Chen Meng
2024	Macau	(China) Sun Yingsha	(China) Wang Manyu	(Japan) Miwa Harimoto
2025	Macau	(China) Sun Yingsha	(China) Kuai Man	(China) Chen Xingtong
2025	Macau	(China) Sun Yingsha	(China) Kuai Man	(Japan) Mima Ito
2026	Macau	(China) Sun Yingsha	(China) Wang Manyu	(South Korea) Shin Yu-bin
2026	Macau	(China) Sun Yingsha	(China) Wang Manyu	(Germany) Sabine Winter

=== Men's doubles ===
Year	Host city	Gold	Silver	Bronze
1990	Seoul	(South Korea) Kim Taek-soo (South Korea) Yoo Nam-kyu	(Germany) Steffen Fetzner (Germany) Jörg Roßkopf	(Poland) Andrzej Grubba (Poland) Leszek Kucharski
1990	Seoul	(South Korea) Kim Taek-soo (South Korea) Yoo Nam-kyu	(Germany) Steffen Fetzner (Germany) Jörg Roßkopf	(Socialist Federal Republic of Yugoslavia) Ilija Lupulesku (Socialist Federal Republic of Yugoslavia) Zoran Primorac
1992	Las Vegas	(South Korea) Kim Taek-soo (South Korea) Yoo Nam-kyu	(Russia) Andrei Mazunov (Russia) Dmitrij Mazunov	(Germany) Steffen Fetzner (Germany) Jörg Roßkopf
1992	Las Vegas	(South Korea) Kim Taek-soo (South Korea) Yoo Nam-kyu	(Russia) Andrei Mazunov (Russia) Dmitrij Mazunov	(South Korea) Kang Hee-chan (South Korea) Lee Chul-seung

=== Women's doubles ===
Year	Host City	Gold	Silver	Bronze
1990	Seoul	(South Korea) Hong Cha-ok (South Korea) Hyun Jung-hwa	(Hong Kong) Chai Po Wa (Hong Kong) Chan Tan Lui	(China) Deng Yaping (China) Hu Xiaoxin
1990	Seoul	(South Korea) Hong Cha-ok (South Korea) Hyun Jung-hwa	(Hong Kong) Chai Po Wa (Hong Kong) Chan Tan Lui	(South Korea) Hong Soon-hwa (South Korea) Lee Tae-joo
1992	Las Vegas	(China) Deng Yaping (China) Qiao Hong	(South Korea) Hong Cha-ok (South Korea) Hyun Jung-hwa	(Hong Kong) Chai Po Wa (Hong Kong) Chan Tan Lui
1992	Las Vegas	(China) Deng Yaping (China) Qiao Hong	(South Korea) Hong Cha-ok (South Korea) Hyun Jung-hwa	(China) Chen Zihe (China) Gao Jun

=== Men's team ===
Year	Host city	Gold	Silver	Bronze
1990	Chiba City	(Sweden) Sweden; Mikael Appelgren; Erik Lindh; Jörgen Persson; Jan-Ove Waldner	(China) China; Chen Longcan; Chen Zhibin; Ma Wenge; Wei Qingguang; Yu Shentong	(England) England; Sky Andrew; Chen Xinhua; Alan Cooke; Desmond Douglas
1990	Chiba City	(Sweden) Sweden; Mikael Appelgren; Erik Lindh; Jörgen Persson; Jan-Ove Waldner	(China) China; Chen Longcan; Chen Zhibin; Ma Wenge; Wei Qingguang; Yu Shentong	(North Korea) North Korea; Kim Guk-chol; Kim Song-hui; Ri Gun-sang
1991	Barcelona	(China) China; Ma Wenge; Wang Hao (born 1966); Wang Tao; Xie Chaojie; Zhang Lei	(Sweden) Sweden; Peter Karlsson; Erik Lindh; Jörgen Persson; Jan-Ove Waldner	(France) France; Nicolas Chatelain; Damien Éloi; Jean-Philippe Gatien; Olivier Marmurek
1991	Barcelona	(China) China; Ma Wenge; Wang Hao (born 1966); Wang Tao; Xie Chaojie; Zhang Lei	(Sweden) Sweden; Peter Karlsson; Erik Lindh; Jörgen Persson; Jan-Ove Waldner	(North Korea) North Korea; Choi Kyong-sob; Kim Guk-chol; Kim Song-hui; Ri Gun-sang
1994	Nimes	(China) China; Ding Song; Lin Zhigang; Liu Guoliang; Wang Hao (born 1966)	(Sweden) Sweden; Mikael Appelgren; Peter Karlsson; Jörgen Persson; Jan-Ove Waldner	(Belgium) Belgium; Thierry Cabrera; Andras Podpinka; Philippe Saive; Frederic Sonnet
1994	Nimes	(China) China; Ding Song; Lin Zhigang; Liu Guoliang; Wang Hao (born 1966)	(Sweden) Sweden; Mikael Appelgren; Peter Karlsson; Jörgen Persson; Jan-Ove Waldner	(France) France; Patrick Chila; Damien Éloi; Jean-Philippe Gatien; Christophe Legoût
1995	Atlanta	(South Korea) South Korea; Chu Kyo-sung; Kim Bong-chul; Kim Taek-soo; Lee Chul-seung; Yoo Nam-kyu	(Germany) Germany; Steffen Fetzner; Peter Franz; Richard Prause; Jörg Roßkopf	(Japan) Japan; Ichiro Imaeda; Kōji Matsushita; Toshio Tasaki; Ryo Yuzawa
1995	Atlanta	(South Korea) South Korea; Chu Kyo-sung; Kim Bong-chul; Kim Taek-soo; Lee Chul-seung; Yoo Nam-kyu	(Germany) Germany; Steffen Fetzner; Peter Franz; Richard Prause; Jörg Roßkopf	(United States) United States; Jim Butler; Cheng Yinghua; David Zhuang
2007	Magdeburg	(China) China; Chen Qi; Ma Lin; Wang Hao (born 1983); Wang Liqin	(Hong Kong) Hong Kong; Cheung Yuk; Leung Chu Yan; Li Ching	(Austria) Austria; Chen Weixing; Robert Gardos; Bernhard Presslmayer; Werner Schlager
2007	Magdeburg	(China) China; Chen Qi; Ma Lin; Wang Hao (born 1983); Wang Liqin	(Hong Kong) Hong Kong; Cheung Yuk; Leung Chu Yan; Li Ching	(South Korea) South Korea; Joo Sae-hyuk; Lee Jung-sam; Oh Sang-eun; Ryu Seung-min
2009	Linz	(China) China; Ma Long; Qiu Yike; Xu Xin; Zhang Jike	(South Korea) South Korea; Joo Sae-hyuk; Oh Sang-eun; Ryu Seung-min; Yoon Jae-young	(Germany) Germany; Patrick Baum; Dimitrij Ovtcharov; Bastian Steger; Christian Süß
2009	Linz	(China) China; Ma Long; Qiu Yike; Xu Xin; Zhang Jike	(South Korea) South Korea; Joo Sae-hyuk; Oh Sang-eun; Ryu Seung-min; Yoon Jae-young	(Hong Kong) Hong Kong; Cheung Yuk; Jiang Tianyi; Leung Chu Yan; Tang Peng; Tse Ka Chun
2010	Dubai	(China) China; Hao Shuai; Ma Long; Wang Hao (born 1983); Xu Xin; Zhang Jike	(South Korea) South Korea; Jeoung Young-sik; Joo Sae-hyuk; Lee Jung-woo; Oh Sang-eun	(Austria) Austria; Chen Weixing; Stefan Fegerl; Robert Gardos; Daniel Habesohn; Werner Schlager
2010	Dubai	(China) China; Hao Shuai; Ma Long; Wang Hao (born 1983); Xu Xin; Zhang Jike	(South Korea) South Korea; Jeoung Young-sik; Joo Sae-hyuk; Lee Jung-woo; Oh Sang-eun	(Germany) Germany; Patrick Baum; Zoltan Fejer-Konnerth; Steffen Mengel
2011	Magdeburg	(China) China; Ma Lin; Ma Long; Wang Hao (born 1983); Wang Liqin; Xu Xin	(South Korea) South Korea; Joo Sae-hyuk; Kim Min-seok; Oh Sang-eun; Ryu Seung-min	(Germany) Germany; Patrick Baum; Ruwen Filus; Dimitrij Ovtcharov; Bastian Steger
2011	Magdeburg	(China) China; Ma Lin; Ma Long; Wang Hao (born 1983); Wang Liqin; Xu Xin	(South Korea) South Korea; Joo Sae-hyuk; Kim Min-seok; Oh Sang-eun; Ryu Seung-min	(Japan) Japan; Kenta Matsudaira; Koki Niwa; Kaii Yoshida
2013	Guangzhou	(China) China; Ma Long; Wang Hao (born 1983); Wang Liqin; Xu Xin; Zhang Jike	(Chinese Taipei) Chinese Taipei; Chen Chien-an; Chiang Hung-chieh; Chuang Chih-yuan; Huang Sheng-sheng; Wu Chih-chi	(Egypt) Egypt; Khalid Assar; Omar Assar; Mohamed El-beiali; El-sayed Lashin; Ahmed Saleh
2013	Guangzhou	(China) China; Ma Long; Wang Hao (born 1983); Wang Liqin; Xu Xin; Zhang Jike	(Chinese Taipei) Chinese Taipei; Chen Chien-an; Chiang Hung-chieh; Chuang Chih-yuan; Huang Sheng-sheng; Wu Chih-chi	(Japan) Japan; Kenta Matsudaira; Jun Mizutani; Koki Niwa
2015	Dubai	(China) China; Fan Zhendong; Fang Bo; Ma Long; Xu Xin; Zhang Jike	(Austria) Austria; Chen Weixing; Stefan Fegerl; Robert Gardos; Daniel Habesohn	(Chinese Taipei) Chinese Taipei; Chen Chien-an; Chiang Hung-chieh; Huang Sheng-sheng; Wu Chih-chi
2015	Dubai	(China) China; Fan Zhendong; Fang Bo; Ma Long; Xu Xin; Zhang Jike	(Austria) Austria; Chen Weixing; Stefan Fegerl; Robert Gardos; Daniel Habesohn	(Portugal) Portugal; Tiago Apolónia; Marcos Freitas; João Geraldo; João Monteiro
2018	London	(China) China; Fan Zhendong; Lin Gaoyuan; Ma Long; Xu Xin; Yu Ziyang	(Japan) Japan; Tomokazu Harimoto; Koki Niwa; Yuya Oshima; Jin Ueda	(England) England; Paul Drinkhall; Tom Jarvis; David McBeath; Liam Pitchford; Sam Walker
2018	London	(China) China; Fan Zhendong; Lin Gaoyuan; Ma Long; Xu Xin; Yu Ziyang	(Japan) Japan; Tomokazu Harimoto; Koki Niwa; Yuya Oshima; Jin Ueda	(South Korea) South Korea; Jeong Sang-eun; Jeoung Young-sik; Lee Sang-su; Lim Jong-hoon
2019	Tokyo	(China) China; Fan Zhendong; Liang Jingkun; Lin Gaoyuan; Ma Long; Xu Xin	(South Korea) South Korea; Cho Dae-seong; Jang Woo-jin; Jeoung Young-sik; Lee Sang-su; Lim Jong-hoon	(Chinese Taipei) Chinese Taipei; Chen Chien-an; Liao Chen-ting; Lin Yun-ju; Peng Wang-wei; Wang Tai-wei
2019	Tokyo	(China) China; Fan Zhendong; Liang Jingkun; Lin Gaoyuan; Ma Long; Xu Xin	(South Korea) South Korea; Cho Dae-seong; Jang Woo-jin; Jeoung Young-sik; Lee Sang-su; Lim Jong-hoon	(Japan) Japan; Tomokazu Harimoto; Takuya Jin; Koki Niwa; Maharu Yoshimura

==== Performance by nations in men's world team ====
Team	Winners	Runners-up	Third place
China	10 (1991, '94, 2007, '09, '10, '11, '13, '15, '18, '19)	1 (1990)	0
South Korea	1 (1995)	4 (2009, '10, '11, '19)	2 (2007, '18)
Sweden	1 (1990)	2 (1991, '94)	0
Japan	0	1 (2018)	4 (1995, 2011, '13, '19)
Germany	0	1 (1995)	3 (2009, '10, '11)
Austria	0	1 (2015)	2 (2007, '10)
Chinese Taipei	0	1 (2013)	2 (2015, '19)
Hong Kong	0	1 (2007)	1 (2009)
North Korea	0	0	2 (1990, '91)
England	0	0	2 (1990, 2018)
France	0	0	2 (1991, '94)
Belgium	0	0	1 (1994)
United States	0	0	1 (1995)
Egypt	0	0	1 (2013)
Portugal	0	0	1 (2015)

=== Women's team ===
Year	Host city	Gold	Silver	Bronze
1990	Chiba City	(China) China; Chen Zihe; Deng Yaping; Gao Jun; Qiao Hong	(North Korea) North Korea; Li Bun-hui; Li Mi-suk; Yu Sun-bok	(Japan) Japan; Mika Hoshino; Miki Kitsukawa; Rika Sato; Tomoko Shimonaga
1990	Chiba City	(China) China; Chen Zihe; Deng Yaping; Gao Jun; Qiao Hong	(North Korea) North Korea; Li Bun-hui; Li Mi-suk; Yu Sun-bok	(South Korea) South Korea; Hong Cha-ok; Hong Soon-hwa; Hyun Jung-hwa
1991	Barcelona	(China) China; Chen Zihe; Deng Yaping; Gao Jun; Liu Wei; Qiao Hong	(South Korea) South Korea; Hong Cha-ok; Hong Soon-hwa; Hyun Jung-hwa	(Japan) Japan; Mika Hoshino; Fumiyo Yamashita-Kaizu; Rika Sato
1991	Barcelona	(China) China; Chen Zihe; Deng Yaping; Gao Jun; Liu Wei; Qiao Hong	(South Korea) South Korea; Hong Cha-ok; Hong Soon-hwa; Hyun Jung-hwa	(North Korea) North Korea; Li Bun-hui; Li Mi-suk; Yu Sun-bok
1994	Nimes	(Russia) Russia; Galina Melnik; Irina Palina; Elena Timina	(Germany) Germany; Christina Fischer; Elke Schall; Jie Schöpp; Nicole Struse	(China) China; Wang Chen; Wu Na; Zhang Ling
1994	Nimes	(Russia) Russia; Galina Melnik; Irina Palina; Elena Timina	(Germany) Germany; Christina Fischer; Elke Schall; Jie Schöpp; Nicole Struse	(Netherlands) Netherlands; Gerdie Keen; Mirjam Hooman-Kloppenburg; Emily Noor; Bettine Vriesekoop
1995	Atlanta	(China) China; Deng Yaping; Liu Wei; Qiao Hong; Qiao Yunping; Yang Ying	(Romania) Romania; Otilia Bădescu; Emilia Elena Ciosu; Georgeta Cojocaru	(Hungary) Hungary; Csilla Bátorfi; Vivien Ello; Krisztina Tóth
1995	Atlanta	(China) China; Deng Yaping; Liu Wei; Qiao Hong; Qiao Yunping; Yang Ying	(Romania) Romania; Otilia Bădescu; Emilia Elena Ciosu; Georgeta Cojocaru	(South Korea) South Korea; Kim Moo-kyo; Park Hae-jung; Park Kyung-ae; Ryu Ji-hye
2007	Magdeburg	(China) China; Guo Yue; Li Xiaoxia; Wang Nan; Zhang Yining	(South Korea) South Korea; Kim Kyung-ah; Kwak Bang-bang; Lee Eun-hee; Park Mi-young	(Hong Kong) Hong Kong; Lau Sui Fei; Lin Ling; Tie Ya Na; Zhang Rui
2007	Magdeburg	(China) China; Guo Yue; Li Xiaoxia; Wang Nan; Zhang Yining	(South Korea) South Korea; Kim Kyung-ah; Kwak Bang-bang; Lee Eun-hee; Park Mi-young	(Hungary) Hungary; Li Bin; Petra Lovas; Georgina Póta; Krisztina Tóth
2009	Linz	(China) China; Ding Ning; Guo Yue; Li Xiaoxia; Liu Shiwen	(Singapore) Singapore; Feng Tianwei; Zena Sim Kai Xin; Sun Beibei; Wang Yuegu; Yu Mengyu	(Hong Kong) Hong Kong; Jiang Huajun; Lau Sui Fei; Lin Ling; Tie Ya Na; Zhang Rui
2009	Linz	(China) China; Ding Ning; Guo Yue; Li Xiaoxia; Liu Shiwen	(Singapore) Singapore; Feng Tianwei; Zena Sim Kai Xin; Sun Beibei; Wang Yuegu; Yu Mengyu	(Japan) Japan; Ai Fukuhara; Sayaka Hirano; Kasumi Ishikawa
2010	Dubai	(China) China; Ding Ning; Guo Yan; Guo Yue; Li Xiaoxia; Liu Shiwen	(Singapore) Singapore; Feng Tianwei; Li Jiawei; Sun Beibei; Wang Yuegu; Yu Mengyu	(South Korea) South Korea; Kim Kyung-ah; Park Mi-young; Seok Ha-jung; Yang Ha-eun
2010	Dubai	(China) China; Ding Ning; Guo Yan; Guo Yue; Li Xiaoxia; Liu Shiwen	(Singapore) Singapore; Feng Tianwei; Li Jiawei; Sun Beibei; Wang Yuegu; Yu Mengyu	(Japan) Japan; Hiroko Fujii; Ai Fukuhara; Kasumi Ishikawa
2011	Magdeburg	(China) China; Ding Ning; Fan Ying; Guo Yan; Guo Yue; Li Xiaoxia	(Japan) Japan; Ai Fukuhara; Sayaka Hirano; Kasumi Ishikawa	(Hong Kong) Hong Kong; Jiang Huajun; Lee Ho Ching; Ng Wing Nam; Tie Ya Na; Yu Kwok See
2011	Magdeburg	(China) China; Ding Ning; Fan Ying; Guo Yan; Guo Yue; Li Xiaoxia	(Japan) Japan; Ai Fukuhara; Sayaka Hirano; Kasumi Ishikawa	(Singapore) Singapore; Feng Tianwei; Li Jiawei; Sun Beibei; Wang Yuegu; Yu Mengyu
2013	Guangzhou	(China) China; Chang Chenchen; Ding Ning; Li Xiaoxia; Liu Shiwen; Wu Yang	(Japan) Japan; Ai Fukuhara; Sayaka Hirano; Kasumi Ishikawa	(Hong Kong) Hong Kong; Guan Mengyuan; Jiang Huajun; Lee Ho Ching; Ng Wing Nam; Tie Ya Na
2013	Guangzhou	(China) China; Chang Chenchen; Ding Ning; Li Xiaoxia; Liu Shiwen; Wu Yang	(Japan) Japan; Ai Fukuhara; Sayaka Hirano; Kasumi Ishikawa	(Singapore) Singapore; Feng Tianwei; Isabelle Li; Yee Herng Hwee; Yu Mengyu
2015	Dubai	(China) China; Chen Meng; Ding Ning; Li Xiaoxia; Liu Shiwen; Zhu Yuling	(North Korea) North Korea; Kim Hye-yong; Kim Jong; Ri Mi-gyong; Ri Myong-sun	(Japan) Japan; Sayaka Hirano; Yuka Ishigaki; Misaki Morizono
2015	Dubai	(China) China; Chen Meng; Ding Ning; Li Xiaoxia; Liu Shiwen; Zhu Yuling	(North Korea) North Korea; Kim Hye-yong; Kim Jong; Ri Mi-gyong; Ri Myong-sun	(Singapore) Singapore; Feng Tianwei; Isabelle Li; Lim Eunice; Yu Mengyu; Zhang Wanling
2018	London	(China) China; Chen Xingtong; Ding Ning; Liu Shiwen; Wang Manyu; Zhu Yuling	(Japan) Japan; Hina Hayata; Miu Hirano; Kasumi Ishikawa; Mima Ito	(Hong Kong) Hong Kong; Doo Hoi Kem; Lee Ho Ching; Mak Tze Wing; Ng Wing Nam; Minnie Soo
2018	London	(China) China; Chen Xingtong; Ding Ning; Liu Shiwen; Wang Manyu; Zhu Yuling	(Japan) Japan; Hina Hayata; Miu Hirano; Kasumi Ishikawa; Mima Ito	(North Korea) North Korea; Cha Hyo-sim; Choe Hyon-hwa; Kim Nam-hee; Kim Song-i
2019	Tokyo	(China) China; Chen Meng; Ding Ning; Liu Shiwen; Sun Yingsha; Wang Manyu	(Japan) Japan; Miu Hirano; Kasumi Ishikawa; Mima Ito; Hitomi Sato	(Chinese Taipei) Chinese Taipei; Chen Szu-yu; Cheng Hsien-tzu; Cheng I-ching; Liu Hsing-yin; Su Pei-ling
2019	Tokyo	(China) China; Chen Meng; Ding Ning; Liu Shiwen; Sun Yingsha; Wang Manyu	(Japan) Japan; Miu Hirano; Kasumi Ishikawa; Mima Ito; Hitomi Sato	(South Korea) South Korea; Choi Hyo-joo; Jeon Ji-hee; Shin Yu-bin; Suh Hyo-won; Yang Ha-eun

==== Performance by nations in women's world team ====
Team	Winners	Runners-up	Third place
China	11 (1990, '91, '95, 2007, '09, '10, '11, '13, '15, '18, '19)	0	1 (1994)
Russia	1 (1994)	0	0
Singapore	0	2 (2009, '10)	3 (2011, '13, '15)
Japan	0	4 (2011, '13, '18, '19)	4 (1991, 2009, '10, '15)
South Korea	0	2 (1991, 2007)	3 (1995, 2010, '19)
North Korea	0	2 (1990, 2015)	2 (1991, 2018)
Romania	0	1 (1995)	0
Germany	0	1 (1994)	0
Hong Kong	0	0	5 (2007, '09, '11, '13, '18)
Hungary	0	0	3 (1990, '95, 2007)
France	0	0	1 (1990)
Netherlands	0	0	1 (1994)
Chinese Taipei	0	0	1 (2019)

=== Mixed team ===
Year	Host City	Gold	Silver	Bronze
2023	Chengdu	(China) China; Chen Meng; Fan Zhendong; Lin Gaoyuan; Ma Long; Sun Yingsha; Wang Chuqin; Wang Manyu; Wang Yidi	(South Korea) South Korea; An Jae-hyun; Jang Woo-jin; Jeon Ji-hee; Kim Na-yeong; Lee Sang-su; Lee Zi-on; Lim Jong-hoon; Shin Yu-bin	(Japan) Japan; Miwa Harimoto; Tomokazu Harimoto; Hina Hayata; Miu Hirano; Miyuu Kihara; Kakeru Sone; Shunsuke Togami; Ryoichi Yoshiyama
2024	Chengdu	(China) China; Kuai Man; Liang Jingkun; Lin Gaoyuan; Lin Shidong; Sun Yingsha; Wang Chuqin; Wang Manyu; Wang Yidi	(South Korea) South Korea; An Jae-hyun; Cho Dae-seong; Jang Woo-jin; Jeon Ji-hee; Kim Na-yeong; Oh Jun-sung; Shin Yu-bin; Suh Hyo-won	(Hong Kong) Hong Kong; Chan Baldwin; Doo Hoi Kem; Lam Siu-hang; Lee Hoi Man Karen; Ng Wing Lam; Wong Chun-ting; Wong Hoi Tung; Yiu Kwan To
2025	Chengdu	China; Kuai Man; Liang Jingkun; Lin Shidong; Sun Yingsha; Wang Chuqin; Wang Manyu; Wang Yidi; Xu Yingbin	Japan; Miwa Harimoto; Tomokazu Harimoto; Hina Hayata; Mima Ito; Sora Matsushima; Satsuki Odo; Hiroto Shinozuka; Shunsuke Togami	Germany; Benedikt Duda; Patrick Franziska; Annett Kaufmann; Nina Mittelham; Dang Qiu; Sabine Winter
2026	Chengdu			
2027	Chengdu			
