= 1991 World Table Tennis Championships – Women's doubles =

1991 Women's doubles

The 1991 World Table Tennis Championships women's doubles was the 40th edition of the women's doubles championship. Chen Zihe and Gao Jun defeated Deng Yaping and Qiao Hong in the final by three sets to one.

== Results ==
Round of 16
(China) Deng Yaping (China) Qiao Hong	21	16	21
(Chinese Taipei) Lin Li-Zu (Chinese Taipei) Xu Jing	18	21	17
Li Bun Hui; Hyun Jung-hwa	21	21
(France) Xiaoming Wang-Dréchou (France) Emmanuelle Coubat	12	13
(China) Hu Xiaoxin (China) Liu Wei	21	21
(Germany) Olga Nemeș (Germany) Cornelia Faltermaier	18	19
Hong Soon-hwa; Han Hye-Song	12	7
(Hong Kong) Chai Po Wa (Hong Kong) Chan Tan Lui	21	21
(Hungary) Csilla Bátorfi (Hungary) Gabriella Wirth	14	21	21
(Socialist Federal Republic of Yugoslavia) Gordana Perkučin (Socialist Federal Republic of Yugoslavia) Jasna Fazlić	21	13	18
(China) Chen Zihe (China) Gao Jun	14	21	21
(Canada) Geng Lijuan (Czechoslovakia) Marie Hrachová	21	12	19
Yu Sun-bok; Hong Cha-ok	21	21
(Japan) Fumiyo Yamashita (Japan) Mika Hoshino	15	14
(Netherlands) Gerdie Keen (Netherlands) Emily Noor	23	10	11
(China) Li Jun (China) Ding Yaping	21	21	21

Quarterfinals
(China) Deng Yaping (China) Qiao Hong	19	21	21	15	21
Li Bun Hui; Hyun Jung-hwa	21	16	16	21	11
(China) Hu Xiaoxin (China) Liu Wei	21	21	21
(Hong Kong) Chai Po Wa (Hong Kong) Chan Tan Lui	16	11	12
(Hungary) Batorfi (Hungary) Wirth	15	9	15
(China) Chen Zihe (China) Gao Jun	21	21	21
Yu Sun-bok; Hong Cha-ok	18	21	16	17
(China) Li Jun (China) Ding Yaping	21	17	21	21

Semifinals
(China) Deng Yaping (China) Qiao Hong	22	21	21
(China) Hu Xiaoxin (China) Liu Wei	20	18	17
(China) Chen Zihe (China) Gao Jun	21	21	21
(China) Li Jun (China) Ding Yaping	10	14	123

Final
(China) Deng Yaping (China) Qiao Hong	20	22	18	17
(China) Chen Zihe (China) Gao Jun	22	20	21	21

== See also ==
List of World Table Tennis Championships medalists
