= 1989 World Table Tennis Championships =

1989 edition of the World Table Tennis Championships

The 1989 World Table Tennis Championships were held in Dortmund from March 29 to April 9, 1989.

== Results ==
=== Team ===
Event	Gold	Silver	Bronze
Swaythling Cup; Men's Team	Sweden; Mikael Appelgren; Peter Karlsson; Erik Lindh; Jörgen Persson; Jan-Ove Waldner	China; Chen Longcan; Jiang Jialiang; Ma Wenge; Teng Yi; Yu Shentong	North Korea; Chu Jong-Chol; Hong Chol; Kim Song-hui; Li Gun-Sang; Yun Mun-Song
Corbillon Cup; Women's Team	China; Chen Jing; Chen Zihe; Hu Xiaoxin; Li Huifen	South Korea; Hong Soon-hwa; Hyun Jung-hwa; Kim Young-mi; Kwon Mi-sook	Hong Kong; Chai Po Wa; Chan Tan Lui; Hui So Hung; Mok Ka Sha

=== Individual ===
Event	Gold	Silver	Bronze
Men's singles	(Sweden) Jan-Ove Waldner	(Sweden) Jörgen Persson	(Poland) Andrzej Grubba
Men's singles	(Sweden) Jan-Ove Waldner	(Sweden) Jörgen Persson	(China) Yu Shentong
Women's singles	(China) Qiao Hong	(North Korea) Li Bun-Hui	(South Korea) Hyun Jung-Hwa
Women's singles	(China) Qiao Hong	(North Korea) Li Bun-Hui	(China) Chen Jing
Men's doubles	(West Germany) Steffen Fetzner (West Germany) Jörg Roßkopf	(Socialist Federal Republic of Yugoslavia) Zoran Kalinić (Poland) Leszek Kucharski	(China) Chen Longcan (China) Wei Qingguang
Men's doubles	(West Germany) Steffen Fetzner (West Germany) Jörg Roßkopf	(Socialist Federal Republic of Yugoslavia) Zoran Kalinić (Poland) Leszek Kucharski	(China) Hui Jun (China) Teng Yi
Women's doubles	(China) Deng Yaping (China) Qiao Hong	(China) Chen Jing (China) Hu Xiaoxin	(China) Gao Jun (China) Liu Wei
Women's doubles	(China) Deng Yaping (China) Qiao Hong	(China) Chen Jing (China) Hu Xiaoxin	(China) Ding Yaping (China) Li Jun
Mixed doubles	(South Korea) Yoo Nam-Kyu (South Korea) Hyun Jung-Hwa	(Socialist Federal Republic of Yugoslavia) Zoran Kalinić (Socialist Federal Republic of Yugoslavia) Gordana Perkučin	(China) Chen Longcan (China) Chen Jing
Mixed doubles	(South Korea) Yoo Nam-Kyu (South Korea) Hyun Jung-Hwa	(Socialist Federal Republic of Yugoslavia) Zoran Kalinić (Socialist Federal Republic of Yugoslavia) Gordana Perkučin	(China) Chen Zhibin (China) Gao Jun
