= 1989 World Table Tennis Championships – Women's doubles =

1989 Women's doubles

The 1989 World Table Tennis Championships women's doubles was the 39th edition of the women's doubles championship. Qiao Hong and Deng Yaping defeated Chen Jing and Hu Xiaoxin in the final by two sets to nil.

== Results ==
Round of 16
(China) Chen Jing (China) Hu Xiaoxin	21	21
(North Korea) An Hui-Suk (North Korea) Yu Sun-bok	14	13
(Bulgaria) Daniela Guergueltcheva (France) Xiaoming Wang	21	21
(Hungary) Csilla Bátorfi (Hungary) Edit Urban	19	8
(China) Li Jun (China) Ding Yaping	21	21
(Romania) Otilia Bădescu (Romania) Maria Bogoslov	14	9
(South Korea) Kwon Mi-sook (South Korea) Hyun Jung-hwa	21	21
(Soviet Union) Irina Palina (Soviet Union) Elena Timina	14	10
(China) Li Huifen (China) Chen Zihe	21	21
(Soviet Union) Valentina Popova (Soviet Union) Galina Melnik	8	7
(China) Liu Wei (China) Gao Jun	21	21
(Bulgaria) Katalina Vitcheva (Soviet Union) Olga Laposhina	13	16
(China) Qiao Hong (China) Deng Yaping	21	21
(Japan) Rika Sato (Japan) Mika Hoshino	16	11
(Hong Kong) Chan Tan Lui (Hong Kong) Chai Po Wa	21	21
(Hungary) Gabriella Wirth (Hungary) Agnes Hegedüs	13	14

Quarterfinals
(China) Chen Jing (China) Hu Xiaoxin	21	21
(Bulgaria) Guergueitcheva (France) Wang Xiaoming	6	17
(China) Li Jun (China) Ding Yaping	22	21
(South Korea) Kwon Mi Sook (South Korea) Hyun Jung-hwa	20	15
(China) Li Huifen (China) Chen Zihe	21	17	16
(China) Liu Wei (China) Gao Jun	15	21	21
(China) Qiao Hong (China) Deng Yaping	21	21
(Hong Kong) Chan Tan Lui (Hong Kong) Chai Po Wa	14	11

Semifinals
(China) Chen Jing (China) Hu Xiaoxin	21	22	21
(China) Li Jun (China) Ding Yaping	14	24	10
(China) Liu Wei (China) Gao Jun	25	13	21
(China) Qiao Hong (China) Deng Yaping	23	21	23

Final
(China) Chen Jing (China) Hu Xiaoxin	18	19
(China) Qiao Hong (China) Deng Yaping	21	21

== See also ==
List of World Table Tennis Championships medalists
