= 1991 World Table Tennis Championships =

1991 edition of the World Table Tennis Championships

The 1991 World Table Tennis Championships were held in Chiba from April 24 to May 6, 1991.

North Korea and South Korea fielded a unified team under the name Korea (コリア Koria), the first of all Unified Korean sporting teams. The women's Korean team captured the gold medal by topping China, winners of eight consecutive titles since 1975, 3–2 in the final.

== Results ==
=== Team ===
Event	Gold	Silver	Bronze
Swaythling Cup; Men's Team	Sweden; Mikael Appelgren; Peter Karlsson; Erik Lindh; Jörgen Persson; Jan-Ove Waldner	Yugoslavia; Zoran Kalinić; Ilija Lupulesku; Zoran Primorac; Robert Smrekar	Czechoslovakia; Milan Grman; Tomáš Jančí; Petr Javůrek; Petr Korbel; Roland Vími
Corbillon Cup; Women's Team	Korea; Hong Cha-ok; Hyun Jung-hwa; Li Bun-hui; Yu Sun-bok	China; Chen Zihe; Deng Yaping; Gao Jun; Qiao Hong	France; Emmanuelle Coubat; Sandrine Derrien; Xiaoming Wang-Dréchou; Agnès Le Lannic

=== Individual ===
Event	Gold	Silver	Bronze
Men's singles	(Sweden) Jörgen Persson	(Sweden) Jan-Ove Waldner	Kim Taek-Soo
Men's singles	(Sweden) Jörgen Persson	(Sweden) Jan-Ove Waldner	(China) Ma Wenge
Women's singles	(China) Deng Yaping	Li Bun-Hui	(Hong Kong) Chan Tan Lui
Women's singles	(China) Deng Yaping	Li Bun-Hui	(China) Qiao Hong
Men's doubles	(Sweden) Peter Karlsson (Sweden) Thomas von Scheele	(China) Lü Lin (China) Wang Tao	(Sweden) Erik Lindh (Sweden) Jörgen Persson
Men's doubles	(Sweden) Peter Karlsson (Sweden) Thomas von Scheele	(China) Lü Lin (China) Wang Tao	(Soviet Union) Andrei Mazunov (Soviet Union) Dmitry Mazunov
Women's doubles	(China) Chen Zihe (China) Gao Jun	(China) Deng Yaping (China) Qiao Hong	(China) Ding Yaping (China) Li Jun
Women's doubles	(China) Chen Zihe (China) Gao Jun	(China) Deng Yaping (China) Qiao Hong	(China) Hu Xiaoxin (China) Liu Wei
Mixed doubles	(China) Wang Tao (China) Liu Wei	(China) Xie Chaojie (China) Chen Zihe	Kim Song-hui; Li Bun-Hui
Mixed doubles	(China) Wang Tao (China) Liu Wei	(China) Xie Chaojie (China) Chen Zihe	(Greece) Kalinikos Kreanga (Romania) Otilia Bădescu

== Unified team of Korea ==
Prior to the competition, North and South Korea discussed the possibility of the first unified football and table tennis teams since Korea's division. In February 1991, they agreed to the creation of the unified table tennis team to compete at the 1991 World Table Tennis Championships. According to Chang Ung, International Olympic Committee member from North Korea, the decision took 22 rounds of talks between the Koreas and five months.

The team used "Korea" (Korean hangul: 코리아, McCune–Reischauer: K'oria, Revised Romanization: Koria, Japanese: コリア Koria) as the country name avoiding Hanguk (한국) or Chosŏn (조선). It also used the Korean Unification Flag as the national flag and Arirang as the national anthem. Upon defeating the supposedly "unbeatable" Chinese team, the women's team caused a big sensation in Korea.

A South Korean movie Korea (코리아) ("As one") was released on May 3, 2012, and describes the story of the women's team. Hyun Jung-Hwa was portrayed by Ha Ji-won and Li Bun-Hui by Bae Doona.
