= 1989 World Table Tennis Championships – Mixed doubles =

1989 Mixed doubles

The 1989 World Table Tennis Championships mixed doubles was the 40th edition of the mixed doubles championship.

Yoo Nam-kyu and Hyun Jung-hwa defeated Zoran Kalinić and Gordana Perkučin in the final by two sets to nil.

== Results ==
Round of 16
(South Korea) Yoo Nam-kyu (South Korea) Hyun Jung-hwa	24	21
(Austria) Ding Yi (Bulgaria) Daniela Guergueltcheva	22	9
(China) Lin Zhigang (China) Liu Wei	15	4
(China) Teng Yi (China) Hu Xiaoxin	21	21
(North Korea) Chu Jong-chol (North Korea) Yu Sun-bok	21	9	21
(China) Hui Jun (China) Qiao Hong	17	21	17
(China) Chen Longcan (China) Chen Jing	21	21
(North Korea) Yun Mun-Song (North Korea) Cho Jung-hui	9	15
(North Korea) Kim Song-hui (North Korea) Li Bun-hui	16	21	21
(China) Yu Shentong (China) Chen Zihe	21	17	8
(Socialist Federal Republic of Yugoslavia) Zoran Kalinić (Socialist Federal Republic of Yugoslavia) Gordana Perkučin	21	21
(China) Xu Zengcai (China) Li Jun	19	17
(China) Chen Zhibin (China) Gao Jun	21	21
(Bulgaria) Mariano Loukov (England) Andrea Holt	10	13
(China) Wei Qingguang (China) Li Huifen	21	21
(Netherlands) Henk Van Spanje (Netherlands) Mirjam Hooman	15	16

Quarterfinals
(South Korea) Yoo Nam-kyu (South Korea) Hyun Jung-hwa	21	21
(China) Teng Yi (China) Hu Xiaoxin	15	9
(North Korea) Chu Jong Chol (North Korea) Yu Sun-bok	12	21	20
(China) Chen Longcan (China) Chen Jing	21	19	22
(North Korea) Kim Song-hui (North Korea) Li Bun-hui	21	15	19
(Socialist Federal Republic of Yugoslavia) Kalinić (Socialist Federal Republic of Yugoslavia) Perkučin	13	21	21
(China) Chen Zhibin (China) Gao Jun	23	18	21
(China) Wei Qingguang (China) Li Huifen	21	21	12

Semifinals
(South Korea) Yoo Nam-kyu (South Korea) Hyun Jung-hwa	16	21	21
(China) Chen Longcan (China) Chen Jing	21	18	12
(Socialist Federal Republic of Yugoslavia) Kalinić (Socialist Federal Republic of Yugoslavia) Perkučin	21	21
(China) Chen Zhibin (China) Gao Jun	12	14

Final
(South Korea) Yoo Nam-kyu (South Korea) Hyun Jung-hwa	21	21
(Socialist Federal Republic of Yugoslavia) Kalinić (Socialist Federal Republic of Yugoslavia) Perkučin	7	13

== See also ==
List of World Table Tennis Championships medalists
