= 1989 World Table Tennis Championships – Women's team =

1989 Corbillon Cup (women's team)

The 1989 World Table Tennis Championships – Corbillon Cup (women's team) was the 33rd edition of the women's team championship.

China won the gold medal defeating South Korea in the final 3–0. Hong Kong won the bronze medal.

== Medalists ==
Event	Gold	Silver	Bronze
	China; Chen Jing; Chen Zihe; Hu Xiaoxin; Li Huifen	South Korea; Hong Soon-hwa; Hyun Jung-hwa; Kim Young-mi; Kwon Mi-sook	Hong Kong; Chai Po Wa; Chan Tan Lui; Hui So Hung; Mok Ka Sha

== Second stage ==
=== Group A ===
Pos	Team	P	W	L	Pts
1	China	3	3	0	3
2	Czechoslovakia	3	2	1	2
3	Romania	3	1	2	1
4	(Socialist Federal Republic of Yugoslavia) Yugoslavia	3	0	3	0

=== Group B ===
Pos	Team	P	W	L	Pts
1	South Korea	3	3	0	3
2	Japan	3	2	1	2
3	Taiwan	3	1	2	1
4	United States	3	0	3	0

=== Group C ===
Pos	Team	P	W	L	Pts
1	Hong Kong	3	3	0	3
2	Hungary	3	2	1	2
3	Soviet Union	3	1	2	1
4	England	3	0	3	0

=== Group D ===
Pos	Team	P	W	L	Pts
1	North Korea	3	3	0	3
2	Sweden	3	2	1	2
3	Netherlands	3	1	2	1
4	Bulgaria	3	0	3	0

== Quarter finals ==
Team One	Team Two	Score
Hungary	North Korea	3–1
China	Sweden	3–0
South Korea	Czechoslovakia	3–0
Hong Kong	Japan	3–0

== Semifinals ==
Team One	Team Two	Score
South Korea	Hungary	3–1
China	Hong Kong	3–0

== Third-place playoff ==
Team One	Team Two	Score
Hong Kong	Hungary	3–0

== Final ==
China 3		South Korea 0	Score
Li Huifen	bt	Hyun Jung-Hwa	
Chen Jing	bt	Hong Soon-Hwa	
?	bt	?	

== See also ==
- List of World Table Tennis Championships medalists
