= 1987 World Table Tennis Championships – Men's team =

1987 Swaythling Cup (men's team)

The 1987 World Table Tennis Championships – Swaythling Cup (men's team) was the 39th edition of the men's team championship.

China won the gold medal defeating Sweden 5–0 in the final. Swedish stars Jan-Ove Waldner and Mikael Appelgren were notably absent from the final due to stomach issues. North Korea won the bronze medal.

== Medalists ==
Event	Gold	Silver	Bronze
	China; Chen Longcan; Chen Xinhua; Jiang Jialiang; Teng Yi; Wang Hao	Sweden; Mikael Appelgren; Ulf Carlsson; Erik Lindh; Jörgen Persson; Jan-Ove Waldner	North Korea; Chu Jong-Chol; Hong Chol; Hong Sun; Kim Song-hui; Li Gun-Sang

== Swaythling Cup tables ==
=== Group A ===
Pos	Team	P	W	L	Pts
1	China	3	3	0	3
2	West Germany	3	2	1	2
3	England	3	1	2	1
4	France	3	0	3	0

=== Group B ===
Pos	Team	P	W	L	Pts
1	Sweden	3	3	0	3
2	(Taiwan) Chinese Taipei	3	2	1	2
3	South Korea	3	1	2	1
4	Czechoslovakia	3	0	3	0

=== Group C ===
Pos	Team	P	W	L	Pts
1	(Socialist Federal Republic of Yugoslavia) Yugoslavia	3	3	0	3
2	Poland	3	2	1	2
3	Soviet Union	3	1	2	1
4	Austria	3	0	3	0

=== Group D ===
Pos	Team	P	W	L	Pts
1	North Korea	3	3	0	3
2	Japan	3	2	1	2
3	Hungary	3	1	2	1
4	India	3	0	3	0

== Quarter finals ==
Team One	Team Two	Score
Poland	North Korea	4–5
China	Japan	5–0
Sweden	West Germany	5–4
Chinese Taipei	Yugoslavia	2–5

== Semifinals ==
Team One	Team Two	Score
Sweden	North Korea	5-2
China	Yugoslavia	5–0

== Third-place playoff ==
Team One	Team Two	Score
North Korea	Yugoslavia	5-1

== Final ==
China 5		Sweden 0	Score
Jiang Jialiang	bt	Carlsson	21–12 19–21 21–12
Teng Yi	bt	Lindh	21–15 21–15
Chen Longcan	bt	Persson	21–19 21–14
Jiang Jialiang	bt	Lindh	19–21 21–7 21–13
Chen Longcan	bt	Carlsson	22–20 21–10

== See also ==
List of World Table Tennis Championships medalists
