= 1989 World Table Tennis Championships – Men's team =

1989 Swaythling Cup (men's team)

The 1989 World Table Tennis Championships – Swaythling Cup (men's team) was the 40th edition of the men's team championship.

Sweden won the gold medal defeating China 5–0 in the final. The final was interrupted during the fourth game when Jiang Jialiang refused to play on against Jan-Ove Waldner after being called for a service foul. After a delay the match continued but Jiang was booed for the remainder of the match. North Korea won the bronze medal defeating the Soviet Union 5–3 in the bronze medal play off.

== Medalists ==
Event	Gold	Silver	Bronze
	Sweden; Mikael Appelgren; Peter Karlsson; Erik Lindh; Jörgen Persson; Jan-Ove Waldner	China; Chen Longcan; Jiang Jialiang; Ma Wenge; Teng Yi; Yu Shentong	North Korea; Chu Jong-Chol; Kim Song-hui; Li Gun-Sang; Yun Mun-Song

== Swaythling Cup tables ==
=== Group A ===
Pos	Team	P	W	L	Pts
1	China	3	3	0	3
2	West Germany	3	1	2	1
3	Belgium	3	1	2	1
4	Hungary	3	1	2	1

=== Group B ===
Pos	Team	P	W	L	Pts
1	Sweden	3	3	0	3
2	South Korea	3	2	1	2
3	Nigeria	3	1	2	1
4	Taiwan	3	0	3	0

=== Group C ===
Pos	Team	P	W	L	Pts
1	North Korea	3	3	0	3
2	Poland	3	2	1	2
3	England	3	1	2	1
4	Netherlands	3	0	3	0

=== Group D ===
Pos	Team	P	W	L	Pts
1	Soviet Union	3	2	1	2
2	Japan	3	2	1	2
3	Czechoslovakia	3	2	1	2
4	(Socialist Federal Republic of Yugoslavia) Yugoslavia	3	0	3	0

== Quarter finals ==
Team One	Team Two	Score
Sweden	West Germany	5–2
China	Poland	5–0
Soviet Union	South Korea	5–3
North Korea	Japan	5–1

== Semifinals ==
Team One	Team Two	Score
Sweden	North Korea	5–0
China	Soviet Union	5–1

== Third-place playoff ==
Team One	Team Two	Score
North Korea	Soviet Union	5–3

== Final ==
Sweden 5		China 0	Score
Appelgren	bt	Jiang Jialiang	21–10 18–21 21–15
Waldner	bt	Teng Yi	22–24 21–19 21–17
Persson	bt	Chen Longcan	22–24 21–16 21–13
Waldner	bt	Jiang Jialiang	21–16 17–21 21–16
Appelgren	bt	Chen Longcan	21–17 21–16

== See also ==
List of World Table Tennis Championships medalists
