= 1991 World Table Tennis Championships – Women's singles =

1991 Women's singles

The 1991 World Table Tennis Championships women's singles was the 41st edition of the women's singles championship. Deng Yaping defeated Ri Pun-hui in the final by three sets to nil, to win the title.

== Results ==
Round of 16
(China) Qiao Hong	21	21	16	21
Hong Soon-hwa	11	16	21	10
(Hong Kong) Chai Po Wa	27	19	21	21
(China) Hu Xiaoxin	25	21	19	14
(China) Gao Jun	16	22	21	17
(Canada) Geng Lijuan	21	24	16	21
(China) Ding Yaping	21	17	17	20
Li Bun-hui	18	21	21	22
Hyun Jung-hwa	14	21	17	21	17
(China) Liu Wei	21	13	21	13	21
(Hong Kong) Chan Tan Lui	22	21	21
(Japan) Mika Hoshino	20	15	16
(Hungary) Csilla Bátorfi	21	21	21
(Czechoslovakia) Marie Hrachová	19	16	15
(China) Deng Yaping	18	21	21	21
Yu Sun-bok	21	16	15	13

Quarterfinals
(China) Qiao Hong	23	21	21	21
(Hong Kong) Chai Po Wa	25	12	14	9
(Canada) Geng Lijuan	16	13	21	21	10
Li Bun-hui	21	21	18	17	21
(China) Liu Wei	21	19	17	21	13
(Hong Kong) Chan Tan Lui	19	21	21	13	21
(Hungary) Bátorfi	21	16	17	15
(China) Deng Yaping	15	21	21	21

Semifinals
(China) Qiao Hong	26	20	20	21	20
Li Bun-hui	24	22	22	16	22
(Hong Kong) Chan Tan Lui	16	9	14
(China) Deng Yaping	21	21	21

Final
Li Bun-hui	13	18	14
(China) Deng Yaping	21	21	21

== See also ==
List of World Table Tennis Championships medalists
