= 1989 World Table Tennis Championships – Women's singles =

1989 Women's singles

The 1989 World Table Tennis Championships women's singles was the 40th edition of the women's singles championship. Qiao Hong defeated Ri Pun-hui in the final by three sets to one, to win the title.

== Results ==
Round of 16
(China) Chen Jing	21	15	21	21
(Romania) Otilia Bădescu	16	21	5	16
(Japan) Kyoko Uchiyama	20	21	21	19	23
(China) Gao Jun	22	19	17	21	21
(China) Li Huifen	22	21	21	21
(Bulgaria) Daniela Guergueltcheva	24	13	18	16
(China) Deng Yaping	17	13	24	21	15
(North Korea) Ri Pun-hui	21	21	22	14	21
(South Korea) Hyun Jung-hwa	19	17	21	21	22
(China) Ding Yaping	21	21	10	12	20
(China) Chen Zihe	17	21	21	22
(Japan) Fumio Yamashita	21	11	5	20
(China) Qiao Hong	21	20	21	21
(Czechoslovakia) Alena Šafářová	9	22	9	17
(France) Xiaoming Wang-Dréchou	21	9	21	21
(Japan) Mika Hoshino	19	21	12	19

Quarterfinals
(China) Chen Jing	21	21	21
(Japan) Uchiyama	10	9	16
(China) Li Huifen	21	19	12	13
(North Korea) Ri Pun-hui	12	21	21	21
(South Korea) Hyun Jung-hwa	21	17	21	21
(China) Chen Zihe	18	21	14	16
(China) Qiao Hong	21	21	21
(France) Wang-Dréchou	16	12	14

Semifinals
(China) Chen Jing	17	20	13
(North Korea) Ri Pun-hui	21	22	21
(South Korea) Hyun Jung-hwa	13	15	17
(China) Qiao Hong	21	21	21

Final
(North Korea) Ri Pun-hui	15	12	21	16
(China) Qiao Hong	21	21	11	21

== See also ==
- List of World Table Tennis Championships medalists
