= 1989 World Table Tennis Championships – Men's singles =

1989 Men's singles

The 1989 World Table Tennis Championships men's singles was the 40th edition of the men's singles championship.

Jan-Ove Waldner defeated Jörgen Persson in the final, winning three sets to two to secure the title.

== Results ==
Round of 16
(China) Jiang Jialiang	21	22	18	21
(North Korea) Chu Jong Cho	12	20	21	18
(China) Yu Shentong	21	18	25	22
(Sweden) Erik Lindh	13	21	23	20
(Sweden) Jörgen Persson	21	18	21	16	21
(China) Xie Chaojie	17	21	16	21	14
(China) Xu Zengcai	17	21	21	21
(South Korea) Yoo Nam-kyu	21	10	17	19
(South Korea) Kim Taek-soo	21	20	21	21
(North Korea) Kim Song Hui	13	22	13	17
(China) Ma Wenge	18	20	12
(Poland) Andrzej Grubba	21	22	21
(Socialist Federal Republic of Yugoslavia) Zoran Primorac	21	16	11	19
(Hungary) Tibor Klampár	18	21	21	21
(Sweden) Jan-Ove Waldner	21	21	21
(Japan) Kiyoshi Saito	17	8	15

Quarterfinals
(China) Jiang Jialiang	20	21	16	18
(China) Yu Shentong	22	18	21	21
(Sweden) Persson	21	21	17	15	21
(China) Xu Zengcai	11	16	21	21	18
(South Korea) Kim Taek-soo	18	19	15
(Poland) Grubba	21	21	21
(Hungary) Klampár	19	21	18	20
(Sweden) Waldner	21	11	21	22

Semifinals
(China) Yu Shentong	21	10	9	11
(Sweden) Persson	11	21	21	21
(Poland) Grubba	21	16	19	17
(Sweden) Waldner	16	21	21	21

Final
(Sweden) Persson	17	18	22	21	10
(Sweden) Waldner	21	21	20	18	21

== See also ==
List of World Table Tennis Championships medalists
