= 1991 World Table Tennis Championships – Men's team =

1991 Swaythling Cup (men's team)

The 1991 World Table Tennis Championships – Swaythling Cup (men's team) was the 41st edition of the men's team championship.

Sweden won the gold medal defeating Yugoslavia 3–2 in the final. Czechoslovakia won the bronze medal defeating the Belgium 3–1 in the bronze medal play off.

The Swaythling Cup used the a new format during 1991. The new format had been voted in by 56 votes to 32 in 1989 and included a knockout phase for the final 16 teams.

== Medalists ==
Event	Gold	Silver	Bronze
	Sweden; Mikael Appelgren; Peter Karlsson; Erik Lindh; Jörgen Persson; Jan-Ove Waldner	Yugoslavia; Zoran Kalinić; Ilija Lupulesku; Zoran Primorac; Robert Smrekar	Czechoslovakia; Milan Grman; Tomáš Jančí; Petr Javůrek; Petr Korbel; Roland Vími

== Final stage knockout phase ==
=== Last 16 ===
Team One	Team Two	Score
Unified Korean Team	United States	3–0
Czechoslovakia	England	3–1
Belgium	Soviet Union	3–1
China	Japan	3–0
Sweden	France	3–1
Yugoslavia	Austria	3–0
Germany	Italy	3–1
Canada	Poland	3–2

=== Quarter finals ===
Team One	Team Two	Score
Sweden	Unified Korean Team	3–1
Czechoslovakia	China	3–2
Yugoslavia	Germany	3–2
Belgium	Canada	3–2

=== Semifinals ===
Team One	Team Two	Score
Sweden	Czechoslovakia	3–0
Yugoslavia	Belgium	3–0

=== Third-place playoff ===
Team One	Team Two	Score
Czechoslovakia	Belgium	3–1

=== Final ===
Sweden 3		(Socialist Federal Republic of Yugoslavia) Yugoslavia 2	Score
Appelgren	bt	Kalinić	21–13 18–21 21–10
Waldner	lost to	Primorac	14–21 11–21
Appelgren & Persson	lost to	Lupulesku & Primorac	16–21 19–21
Waldner	bt	Kalinić	21–9 21–8
Persson	bt	Lupulesku	21–18 23–21

== See also ==
List of World Table Tennis Championships medalists
