= 1993 World Table Tennis Championships – Men's singles =

1993 Men's singles

The 1993 World Table Tennis Championships men's singles was the 42nd edition of the men's singles championship.

Jean-Philippe Gatien defeated Jean-Michel Saive in the final, winning three sets to two to secure the title.

== Results ==
Round of 16
(Sweden) Jan-Ove Waldner	19	21	21	13	21
(Russia) Dmitry Mazunov	21	16	16	21	17
(Canada) Johnny Huang	20	18	19
(South Korea) Kim Taek-soo	22	21	21
(Belgium) Jean-Michel Saive	21	21	21
(Poland) Andrzej Grubba	17	15	19
(North Korea) Ri Gun-sang	13	21	13	20
(China) Ma Wenge	21	16	21	22
(Belgium) Philippe Saive	12	11	12
(China) Wang Yonggang	21	21	21
(Croatia) Zoran Primorac	21	14	21	16	21
(Germany) Jörg Roßkopf	15	21	16	21	16
(China) Wang Hao	21	21	19	14	20
(Belgium) Andras Podpinka	15	17	21	21	22
(France) Jean-Philippe Gatien	21	20	21	22
(Belarus) Vladimir Samsonov	17	22	15	20

Quarterfinals
(Sweden) Waldner	21	21	21
(South Korea) Kim Taek-soo	10	9	18
(Belgium) Saive	12	21	21	13	21
(China) Ma Wenge	21	19	17	21	13
(China) Yonggang	20	10	21	13
(Croatia) Primorac	22	21	19	21
(Belgium) Podpinka	12	26	21	21	17
(France) Gatien	21	28	17	10	21

Semifinals
(Sweden) Waldner	17	23	16
(Belgium) Saive	21	25	21
(Croatia) Primorac	21	16	21	16	11
(France) Gatien	12	21	17	21	21

Final
(Belgium) Saive	19	21	14	21	18
(France) Gatien	21	17	21	17	21

== See also ==
List of World Table Tennis Championships medalists
