= 1999 World Table Tennis Championships – Men's singles =

1999 Men's singles

The 1999 World Table Tennis Championships men's singles was the 45th edition of the men's singles championship.

Liu Guoliang defeated Ma Lin in the final, winning three sets to two to secure the title.

== Results ==
Round of 16
(China) Ma Lin	15	21	21	21
(Belarus) Vladimir Samsonov	21	13	18	16
(South Korea) Kim Taek-soo	17	21	11	21	21
(Belgium) Jean-Michel Saive	21	17	21	14	10
(Sweden) Jan-Ove Waldner	21	18	21	16	21
(France) Christophe Legoût	13	21	19	21	14
(Poland) Lucjan Błaszczyk	21	8	10	14
(China) Kong Linghui	13	21	21	21
(Croatia) Zoran Primorac	21	11	21	21
(Sweden) Peter Karlsson	15	21	19	5
(Austria) Werner Schlager	21	21	21
(France) Damien Éloi	19	18	12
(Sweden) Jörgen Persson	16	21	21	17	21
(China) Yan Sen	21	13	17	21	14
(France) Jean-Philippe Gatien	21	21	17	14
(China) Liu Guoliang	15	23	21	21

Quarterfinals
(China) Ma Lin	21	21	21
(South Korea) Kim Taek-soo	13	18	8
(Sweden) Waldner	22	13	21	19	21
(China) Kong Linghui	20	21	18	21	15
(Croatia) Primorac	18	21	21	11	14
(Austria) Schlager	21	19	17	21	21
(Sweden) Persson	7	10	15
(China) Liu Guoliang	21	21	21

Semifinals
(China) Ma Lin	18	14	21	21	21
(Sweden) Waldner	21	21	19	19	17
(Austria) Schlager	10	18	21	16
(China) Liu Guoliang	21	21	18	21

Final
(China) Ma Lin	16	21	21	16	22
(China) Liu Guoliang	21	19	19	21	24

== See also ==
- List of World Table Tennis Championships medalists
