= 1997 World Table Tennis Championships – Men's singles =

1997 Men's singles

The 1997 World Table Tennis Championships men's singles was the 44th edition of the men's singles championship.

Jan-Ove Waldner defeated Vladimir Samsonov in the final, winning three sets to nil to secure the title.

== Results ==
Round of 16
(China) Kong Linghui	21	22	17	21
(Austria) Werner Schlager	16	20	21	18
(China) Ma Wenge	21	21	17	21
(Japan) Hiroshi Shibutani	19	17	21	17
(China) Ding Song	21	21	21
(Slovakia) Milan Grman	19	14	9
(China) Wang Liqin	16	21	22	19
(Belarus) Vladimir Samsonov	21	10	24	21
(Spain) He Zhiwen	21	21	21
(Poland) Lucjan Błaszczyk	12	18	16
(Canada) Johnny Huang	17	22	21	18	18
(China) Yan Sen	21	20	16	21	21
(China) Wang Tao	19	17	17
(France) Jean-Philippe Gatien	21	21	21
(Croatia) Zoran Primorac	16	13	13
(Sweden) Jan-Ove Waldner	21	21	21

Quarterfinals
(China) Kong Linghui	16	22	14	21	21
(China) Ma Wenge	21	20	21	15	12
(China) Ding Song	13	9	10
(Belarus) Samsonov	21	21	21
(Spain) He Zhiwen	19	21	13	19
(China) Yan Sen	21	19	21	21
(France) Gatien	7	20	14
(Sweden) Waldner	21	22	21

Semifinals
(China) Kong Linghui	15	18	21	17
(Belarus) Samsonov	21	21	17	21
(China) Yan Sen	17	14	12
(Sweden) Waldner	21	21	21

Final
(Belarus) Samsonov	12	17	13
(Sweden) Waldner	21	21	21

== See also ==
List of World Table Tennis Championships medalists
