= Jan-Ove Waldner =

Swedish table tennis player

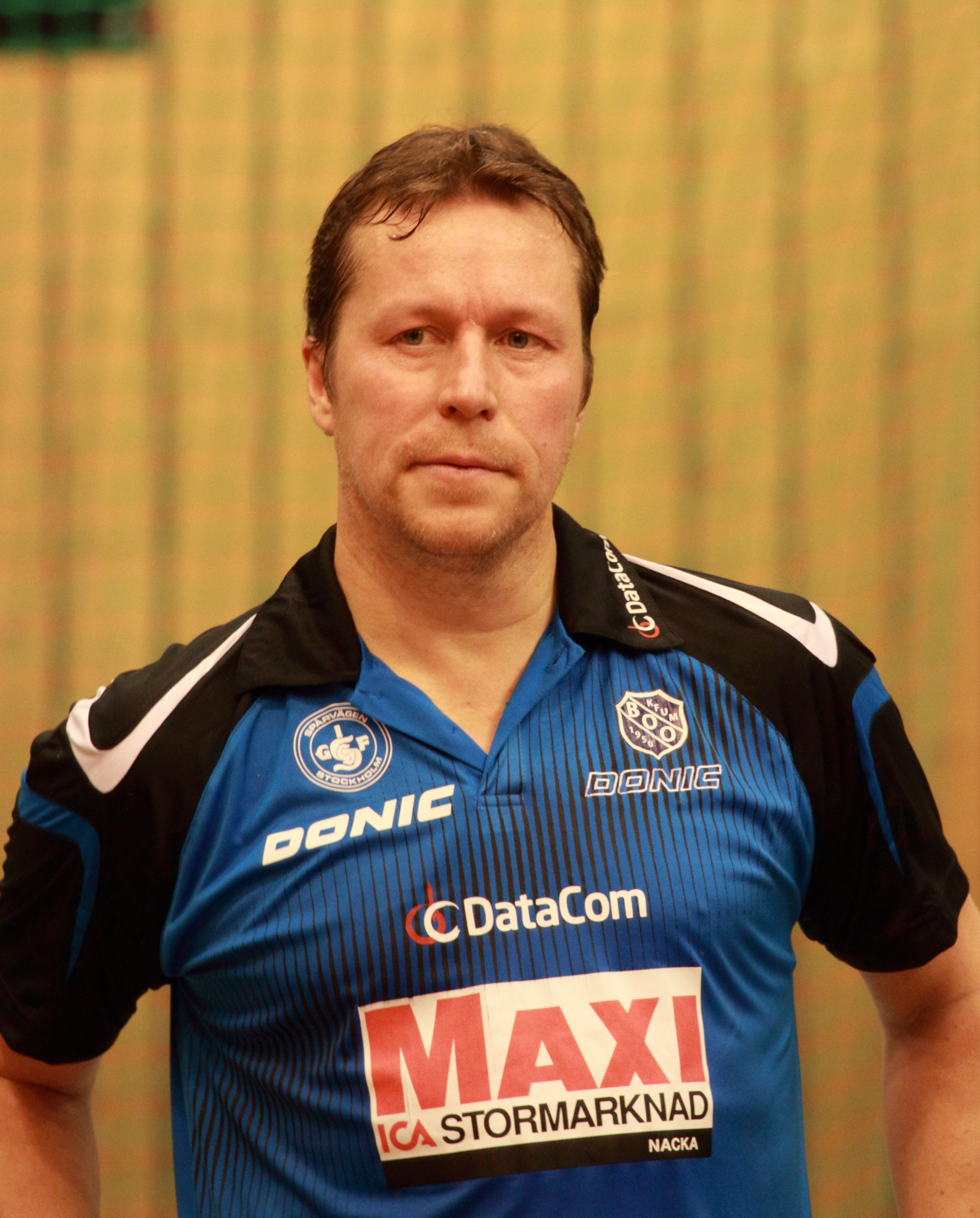
- Jan-Ove Waldner in 2012

Personal information
- Full name: Jan-Ove Waldner
- Nicknames: J-O 老瓦 (Lǎo Wǎ, 'Old Wa')
- Nationality: Swedish
- Born: 3 October 1965 (age 60) Stockholm, Sweden

Sport
- Sport: Table tennis
- Playing style: Shakehand grip
Medal record
Men's table tennis
Representing Sweden
Olympic Games
Gold medal – first place	1992 Barcelona	Singles
Silver medal – second place	2000 Sydney	Singles
World Championships
Gold medal – first place	1989 Dortmund	Singles
Gold medal – first place	1989 Dortmund	Team
Gold medal – first place	1991 Chiba	Team
Gold medal – first place	1993 Gothenburg	Team
Gold medal – first place	1997 Manchester	Singles
Gold medal – first place	2000 Kuala Lumpur	Team
Silver medal – second place	1983 Tokyo	Team
Silver medal – second place	1985 Gothenburg	Team
Silver medal – second place	1987 New Delhi	Singles
Silver medal – second place	1987 New Delhi	Team
Silver medal – second place	1991 Chiba	Singles
Silver medal – second place	1995 Tianjin	Team
Silver medal – second place	1997 Manchester	Doubles
Bronze medal – third place	1993 Gothenburg	Singles
Bronze medal – third place	1999 Eindhoven	Singles
Bronze medal – third place	2001 Osaka	Team
World Cup
Gold medal – first place	1990 Chiba City	Singles
Gold medal – first place	1990 Chiba City	Team
Silver medal – second place	1983 Barbados	Singles
Silver medal – second place	1991 Barcelona	Team
Silver medal – second place	1994 Nimes	Team
Silver medal – second place	1996 Nimes	Singles
Bronze medal – third place	1991 Barcelona	Singles
European Championships
Gold medal – first place	1986 Prague	Doubles
Gold medal – first place	1986 Prague	Team
Gold medal – first place	1988 Paris	Doubles
Gold medal – first place	1988 Paris	Team
Gold medal – first place	1990 Gothenburg	Team
Gold medal – first place	1992 Stuttgart	Team
Gold medal – first place	1996 Bratislava	Singles
Gold medal – first place	1996 Bratislava	Doubles
Gold medal – first place	1996 Bratislava	Team
Gold medal – first place	2000 Bremen	Team
Gold medal – first place	2002 Zagreb	Team
Silver medal – second place	1982 Budapest	Singles
Silver medal – second place	1984 Moscow	Doubles
Silver medal – second place	1992 Stuttgart	Doubles
Silver medal – second place	1994 Birmingham	Singles
Silver medal – second place	1994 Birmingham	Team
Bronze medal – third place	1984 Moscow	Team
Bronze medal – third place	1988 Paris	Singles
Bronze medal – third place	1998 Eindhoven	Doubles
Bronze medal – third place	1998 Eindhoven	Team
Bronze medal – third place	2000 Bremen	Singles

Jan-Ove Waldner (Note: Officially spelled Valdner in the Swedish civil records.) (Swedish: [ˈjɑːn uːvɛ ˈvǎldnɛr]; born 3 October 1965), in Sweden commonly J-O Waldner or simply mononymously as J-O (Swedish: [ˈjîː.(j)uː]), is a Swedish former professional table tennis player. He is often referred to as "the Mozart of table tennis." A sporting legend in his native Sweden as well as in China, he is known in China as 老瓦 Lǎo Wǎ 'Old Wa' or 常青树 Cháng Qīng Shù 'Evergreen Tree', because of his extraordinary longevity and competitiveness.

== Biography ==
Jan-Ove Waldner was born in Stockholm on 3 October 1965. His athletic potential was recognised at an early age and was displayed in 1982 when, as a 16-year-old, he reached the final of the European Championships, losing to distinguished left-handed teammate Mikael Appelgren, who was perceived then as the logical successor to the first Swedish World Champion, Stellan Bengtsson. While still developing his game, Waldner, along with several other Swedish players, traveled to a national-level training camp held in China, and was reportedly amazed by the dedication and solidarity of the Chinese players. He has claimed ever since that he learned much during his stay, and thereafter first began to regard his opportunity to succeed in table tennis as paramount.

Waldner won the gold medal in the men's singles at 1992 Summer Olympics, becoming the first and to date only player not from China, Japan, or South Korea to win an Olympic table tennis title. Eight years later, he won silver in the same event at the 2000 Summer Olympics, narrowly losing to Kong Linghui.

Along with Mikael Appelgren, Erik Lindh, Jörgen Persson, Peter Karlsson and Fredrik Håkansson (in Kuala Lumpur in 2000), he never finished worse than second in the World Team Championship discipline except on a single occasion. In fact, the team (Waldner with the former 4) consecutively won the Swaythling Cup in 1989-1993 for 3 times and won it again in 2000 with the latter 3.

In China, he is considered the best-known Swedish person. In the 1990s, he was more recognisable in China than then-President of the United States Bill Clinton. His long career has led to his being nicknamed "the Evergreen Tree" (Changqing Shu 常青树) in Mandarin.

In 2010 Waldner won his ninth Swedish championship, defeating Pär Gerell, who was born the same year Waldner became Swedish national champion for the first time.

He played for TTC Rhön-Sprudel Fulda-Maberzell in the German Bundesliga until May 2012. In May 2012 Stefan Frauenholz, Fulda-Maberzell's President, confirmed that Jan-Ove Waldner had finished his contract with the club. Timo Boll: "Was yesterday's match against us the last one for Jan-Ove Waldner?", referring to the Bundesliga semifinal between Borussia Düsseldorf and Fulda-Maberzell. This ended his career at the international elite level, at the age of 46 years.

In 2012 he began playing for Spårvägens BTK.

On 11 February 2016, Waldner played his last game in the Swedish first league for Ängby/Spårvägen and officially announced his retirement as a player.

When he retired, Waldner had been playing international elite level table tennis for more than thirty years, which is somewhat unusual in the table tennis world given that hand–eye coordination and quick reactions are essential. Some young Chinese players whom he has recently played against were trained by those he played against in the 1990s, who were in turn trained by others he played in the 1980s.

He is one of the seven table tennis players who competed at the first five Olympic Games table tennis tournaments since the sport's introduction at the Games in 1988. The others are Swede Jörgen Persson, Croatian Zoran Primorac, Belgian Jean-Michel Saive, Hungarian Csilla Bátorfi, Serbian-American Ilija Lupulesku, and German Jörg Roßkopf.

He was also the first of only six male players in the history of table tennis to achieve a career grand slam (World Champion, World Cup and Olympic gold medal winner in singles) (in 1992). The others are: Liu Guoliang, China (in 1999), Kong Linghui, China (in 2000), Zhang Jike, China (in 2012), Ma Long, China (in 2016), and Fan Zhendong, China (in 2024).

== Olympic Games ==
- 1988 Final 8 in single, final 8 in double
- 1992 Gold medal in single, first round in double
- 1996 Final 16 in single, final 8 in double
- 2000 Silver medal in single, final 16 in double
- 2004 Fourth in single, final 8 in double

== World championships ==
- 1983 Silver medal in team competition
- 1985 Silver medal in team competition
- 1987 Silver medal in single, silver medal in team competition
- 1989 Gold medal in single, gold medal in team competition
- 1991 Silver medal in single, gold medal in team competition
- 1993 Bronze medal in single, gold medal in team competition
- 1995 Silver medal in team competition
- 1997 Gold medal in single (21-0 in games), silver medal in double
- 1999 Bronze medal in single
- 2000 Gold medal in team competition
- 2001 Bronze medal in team competition

== European Championships ==
- 1982 Silver medal in single
- 1984 Silver medal in double, bronze medal in team competition
- 1986 Gold medal in double, gold medal in team competition
- 1988 Gold medal in double, gold medal in team competition
- 1990 Gold medal in team competition
- 1992 Silver medal in double, gold medal in team competition
- 1994 Silver medal in single, silver medal in team competition
- 1996 Gold medal in single, gold medal in double, gold medal in team competition
- 1998 Bronze medal in double, bronze medal in team competition
- 2000 Bronze medal in single, gold medal in team competition
- 2002 Gold medal in team competition

== Swedish Championships ==
- 1981 Gold medal in double
- 1982 Gold medal in double
- 1983 Gold medal in single
- 1984 Gold medal in single
- 1986 Gold medal in single, gold medal in double
- 1987 Silver medal in double
- 1989 Gold medal in single, silver medal in double
- 1991 Gold medal in single, gold medal in double
- 1992 Gold medal in double
- 1993 Silver medal in double
- 1994 Silver medal in single, gold medal in double
- 1996 Gold medal in single
- 1997 Gold medal in single, silver medal in double
- 1999 Gold medal in double
- 2006 Gold medal in single
- 2010 Gold medal in single
- 2011 Gold in inter branch tournament

== See also ==
- List of athletes with the most appearances at Olympic Games

== Notes ==
Preceded by Pernilla Wiberg	Svenska Dagbladet Gold Medal; 1992	Succeeded by Torgny Mogren
