= 1997 World Table Tennis Championships – Men's doubles =

1997 Men's doubles

The 1997 World Table Tennis Championships men's doubles was the 44th edition of the men's doubles championship. Kong Linghui and Liu Guoliang won the title after defeating Jörgen Persson and Jan-Ove Waldner in the final by three sets to two.

== Results ==
Round of 16
(China) Kong Linghui (China) Liu Guoliang	22	21
(Canada) Wenguan Johnny Huang (Serbia) Ilija Lupulesku	20	19
(Sweden) Peter Karlsson (Sweden) Thomas von Scheele	13	21	10
(Germany) Jörg Roßkopf (Belarus) Vladimir Samsonov	21	17	21
(France) Jean-Philippe Gatien (France) Damien Éloi	21	21
(Netherlands) Trinko Keen (Netherlands) Danny Heister	14	19
(Russia) Dmitry Mazunov (Russia) Andrei Mazunov	21	19	13
(China) Yan Sen (China) Wang Liqin	15	21	21
(China) Wang Tao (China) Ma Lin	21	21
(Serbia) Slobodan Grujić (Serbia) Aleksandar Karakašević	17	18
(France) Patrick Chila (France) Christophe Legoût	21	15	15
(Japan) Kōji Matsushita (Japan) Hiroshi Shibutani	19	21	21
(Austria) Werner Schlager (Austria) Karl Jindrak	14	21	21
(China) Lin Zhigang (China) Wang Fei	21	11	19
(Greece) Kalinikos Kreanga (Croatia) Zoran Primorac	15	14
(Sweden) Jan-Ove Waldner (Sweden) Jörgen Persson	21	21

Quarterfinals
(China) Kong Linghui (China) Liu Guoliang	17	21	21	21
(Belarus) Samsonov (Germany) Roßkopf	21	12	13	10
(France) Gatien (France) Éloi	21	21	12	22
(China) Yan Sen (China) Wang Liqin	10	10	21	20
(China) Wang Tao (China) Ma Lin	15	19	15
(Japan) Matsushita (Japan) Shibutani	21	21	21
(Austria) Schlager (Austria) Jindrak	21	19	25	16
(Sweden) Waldner (Sweden) Persson	19	21	27	21

Semifinals
(China) Kong Linghui (China) Liu Guoliang	22	21	21
(France) Gatien (France) Éloi	20	7	9
(Japan) Matsushita (Japan) Shibutani	19	21	18	21	18
(Sweden) Waldner (Sweden) Persson	21	13	21	18	21

Final
(China) Kong Linghui (China) Liu Guoliang	19	21	18	21	21
(Sweden) Waldner (Sweden) Persson	21	15	21	13	17

== See also ==
List of World Table Tennis Championships medalists
