= Kim Young-mi (table tennis) =

South Korean table tennis player

Personal information
- Nationality: South Korea
- Born: 1967 (age 58–59)
Medal record
Representing South Korea
World Table Tennis Championships
Silver medal – second place	1989	women's team

Kim Young-mi is a female former international table tennis player from South Korea.

== Table tennis career ==
She won a silver medal for South Korea at the 1989 World Table Tennis Championships in the Corbillon Cup (women's team event) with Hong Soon-hwa, Hyun Jung-hwa and Kwon Mi-sook.

== See also ==
- List of World Table Tennis Championships medalists
