= Kwon Mi-sook =

South Korean table tennis player

Personal information
- Nationality: South Korea
- Born: 1972 (age 53–54)
Medal record
Representing South Korea
World Table Tennis Championships
Silver medal – second place	1989	women's team

Kwon Mi-sook is a female former international table tennis player from South Korea.

== Table tennis career ==
She won a silver medal for South Korea at the 1989 World Table Tennis Championships in the Corbillon Cup (women's team event) with Hong Soon-hwa, Hyun Jung-hwa and Kim Young-mi.

She retired from playing at the age of 22 and later became the head coach of the Philippines women's table tennis team in February 2014.

== See also ==
- List of World Table Tennis Championships medalists
