= 1991 World Table Tennis Championships – Men's singles =

1991 Men's singles

The 1991 World Table Tennis Championships men's singles was the 41st edition of the men's singles championship.

Jörgen Persson defeated Jan-Ove Waldner in the final, winning three sets to nil to secure the title.

== Results ==
Round of 16
(Sweden) Jan-Ove Waldner	21	21	21
(West Germany) Jörg Roßkopf	18	17	18
(China) Wang Hao	9	18	15
(France) Jean-Philippe Gatien	21	21	21
Yoo Nam-kyu	21	21	21
(Japan) Hiroshi Shibutani	9	10	16
(China) Chen Xinhua	15	21	16	4
(China) Ma Wenge	21	14	21	21
(Poland) Andrzej Grubba	21	21	21
(China) Chen Zhibin	16	19	6
(Sweden) Jörgen Persson	21	18	12	21	21
(Belgium) Jean-Michel Saive	17	21	21	14	18
(China) Xie Chaojie	10	22	13	13
Kim Taek-soo	21	20	21	21
(China) Yu Shentong	19	15	21	19
Lee Chul-seung	21	21	19	21

Quarterfinals
(Sweden) Waldner	16	21	17	21	21
(France) Gatien	21	15	21	15	14
Yoo Nam-kyu	23	15	18	21	11
(China) Ma Wenge	21	21	21	18	21
(Poland) Grubba	21	19	21	18	16
(Sweden) Persson	15	21	19	21	21
Kim Taek-soo	18	21	9	21	21
Lee Chul-seung	21	12	21	16	13

Semifinals
(Sweden) Waldner	21	18	21	21
(China) Ma Wenge	18	21	7	15
(Sweden) Persson	21	24	21
Kim Taek-soo	12	22	18

Final
(Sweden) Waldner	19	18	18
(Sweden) Persson	21	21	21

== See also ==
List of World Table Tennis Championships medalists
