= Robert Smrekar =

Slovene table tennis player

Personal information
- Nationality: Slovenia
Medal record
Representing Yugoslavia
World Table Tennis Championships
Silver medal – second place	1991	Men's Team

Robert Smrekar is a male former international table tennis player from Slovenia.

He won a silver medal at the 1991 World Table Tennis Championships in the Swaythling Cup (men's team event) with Zoran Kalinić, Ilija Lupulesku and Zoran Primorac for Yugoslavia.

== See also ==
- List of table tennis players
- List of World Table Tennis Championships medalists
