= Hong Chol =

North Korean table tennis player

Personal information
- Native name: 홍철
- Nationality: North Korea
Medal record
Representing North Korea
World Table Tennis Championships
Bronze medal – third place	1987	Men's Team

Hong Chol is a male former international table tennis player from North Korea.

He won a bronze medal at the 1987 World Table Tennis Championships in the Swaythling Cup (men's team event) with Chu Jong-Chol, Kim Song-hui and Li Gun-Sang for North Korea.

He also won a bronze medal at the Asian Games in 1978.

== See also ==
- List of table tennis players
- List of World Table Tennis Championships medalists
