= Galina Melnik =

Russian table tennis player

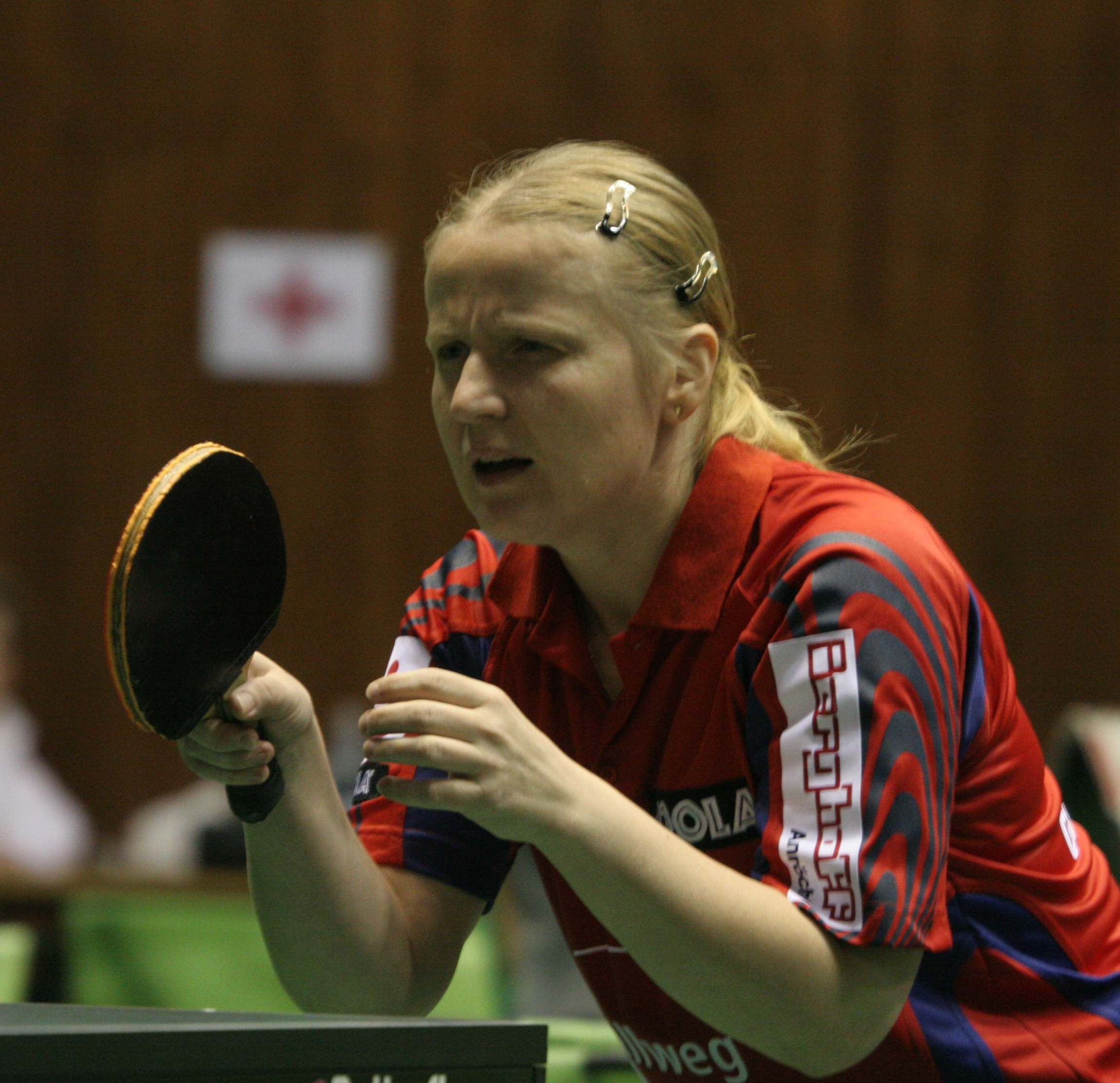

Personal information
- Full name: Melnik Galina
- Nationality: Russia Soviet Union
- Born: 27 April 1970 (age 56)

Sport
- Sport: Table tennis
Medal record
Women's table tennis
World Cup
Representing Russia
Gold medal – first place	1994 Nîmes	Team
European Championships
Representing Soviet Union
Bronze medal – third place	1990 Gothenburg	Doubles
Representing Unified Team
Bronze medal – third place	1992 Stuttgart	Team
Representing Russia
Gold medal – first place	1994 Birmingham	Team
Bronze medal – third place	1996 Bratislava	Mixed

Galina Melnik (born 27 April 1970) is a former female table tennis player from Russia. She won a gold medal in the Women's Team event at the Table Tennis World Cup in 1994.
