= Gerdie Keen =

Dutch table tennis player

Personal information
- Full name: KEEN Gerdie
- Nationality: Netherlands

Sport
- Sport: Table tennis
Medal record
Women's table tennis
Representing Netherlands
World Cup
Bronze medal – third place	1994 Nimes	Team
European Championships
Silver medal – second place	1994 Birmingham	Singles

Gerdie Keen (born 29 September 1969, Wageningen) is a Dutch professional table tennis player. She competed at the 1996 Summer Olympics. She is the older sister of Trinko Keen.

== Career highlights ==
Summer Olympic Games
1996, Atlanta, women's singles, 1st round
1996, Atlanta, women's doubles, 1st round
World Championships
1985, Gothenburg, team competition, 4th
1987, New Delhi, women's doubles, last 32
1987, New Delhi, team competition, 4th
1991, Chiba, women's doubles, last 16
1995, Tianjin, mixed doubles, last 16
World Team Cup:
1994, Nîmes, 3rd (bronze)
Pro Tour Meetings
1997, Kettering, women's singles, quarter final
1997, Kettering, women's doubles, quarter final
1998, Houston, women's singles, quarter final
1998, Houston, women's doubles, quarter final
1998, Beirut, women's doubles, quarter final
European Championships
1988, Paris, women's singles, last 16
1990, Gothenburg, women's singles, quarter final
1992, Stuttgart, women's singles, quarter final
1992, Stuttgart, mixed doubles, quarter final
1994, Birmingham, women's singles, runner-up (silver)
1998, Eindhoven, women's singles, last 16
1998, Eindhoven, women's doubles, quarter final

== See also ==
- List of table tennis players
