= Yun Mun-song =

North Korean table tennis player

Yun Mun-Song
Personal information
- Nationality: North Korea
Medal record
Representing North Korea
World Table Tennis Championships
Bronze medal – third place	1989	Men's Team

Yun Mun-Song (Korean: 윤문성) is a former international table tennis player from North Korea.

== Career ==
As a table tennis player, Yun won a bronze medal at the 1989 World Table Tennis Championships in the Swaythling Cup (men's team event) with Chu Jong-Chol, Kim Song-hui and Li Gun-Sang for North Korea.

== See also ==
- List of table tennis players
- List of World Table Tennis Championships medalists
