= Emily Noor =

Dutch table tennis player

Emily Noor (born 5 March 1971 in Someren) is a Dutch professional table tennis player.

== Career highlights ==
Summer Olympic Games
1996, Atlanta, women's doubles, 1st round
World Championships
1987, New Delhi, women's doubles, last 32
1987, New Delhi, team competition, 4th
1989, Dortmund, mixed doubles, last 32
1991, Chiba, women's doubles, last 16
1991, Chiba, mixed doubles, last 32
World Team Cup:
1994, Nîmes, 3rd (bronze)
Pro Tour Meetings
1996, Kitaku-Shu, women's doubles, quarter final
1996, Fort Lauderdale, women's singles, quarter final
1997, Luon, women's doubles, quarter final
European Championships
1990, Gothenburg, women's singles, last 16
1996, Bratislava, women's doubles, runner-up (silver)
