= Fumiyo Yamashita-Kaizu =

Japanese table tennis player

Personal information
- Nationality: Japanese
- Born: 1 April 1967 (age 57)

Sport
- Sport: Table tennis

Fumiyo Yamashita-Kaizu (born 1 April 1967) is a Japanese table tennis player. She competed at the 1992 Summer Olympics and the 1996 Summer Olympics.
