= Jörgen Persson =

Swedish table tennis player (born 1966)

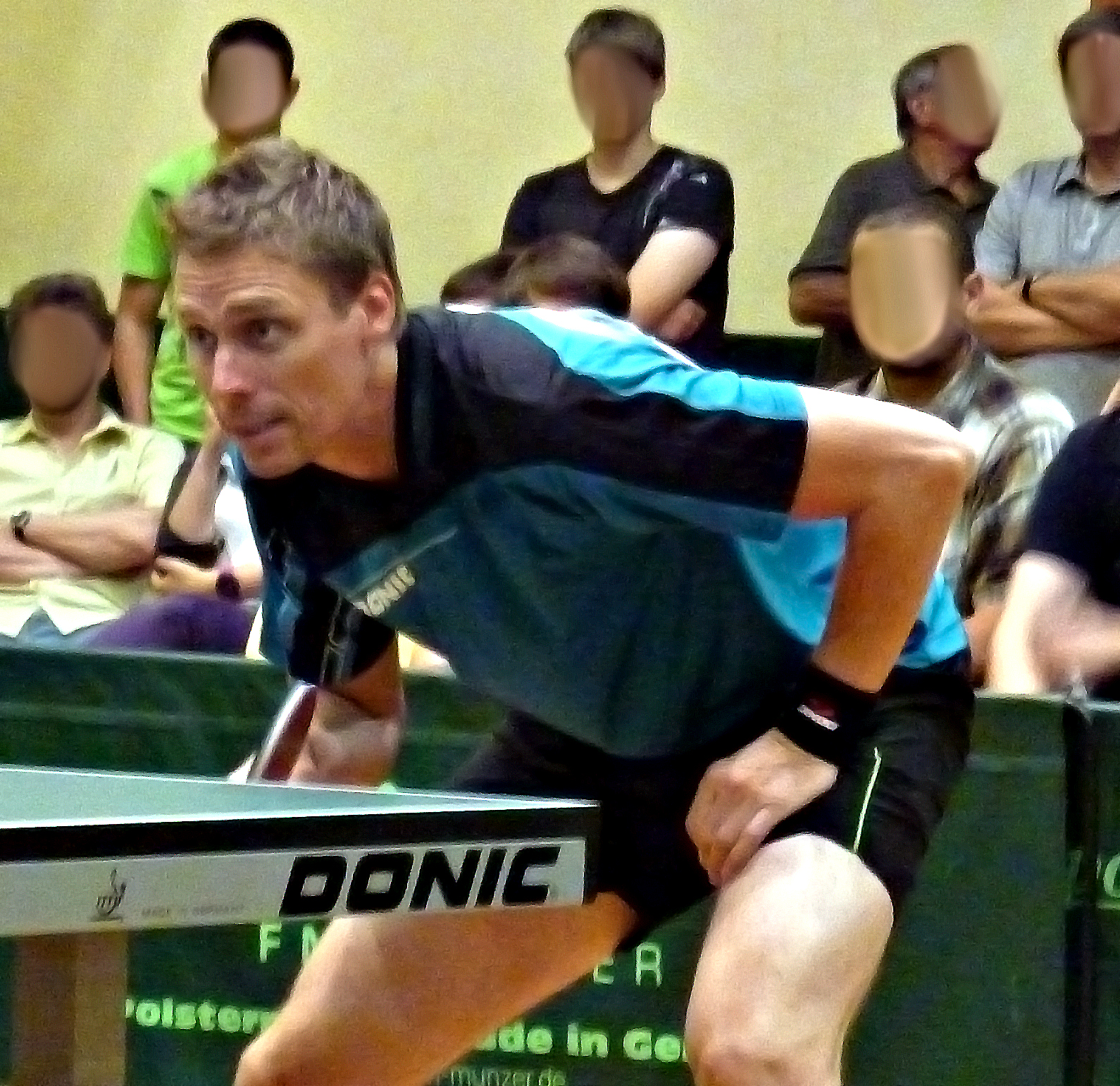
- Jörgen Persson

Personal information
- Full name: Lars-Erik Jörgen Persson
- Nationality: Sweden
- Born: 22 April 1966 (age 60) Halmstad, Sweden

Sport
- Sport: Table tennis
- Playing style: Shakehands grip
- Highest ranking: 1 (May 1991 - March 1992)
Medal record
Men's table tennis
Representing Sweden
World Championships
Gold medal – first place	1989 Dortmund	Team
Gold medal – first place	1991 Chiba	Singles
Gold medal – first place	1991 Chiba	Team
Gold medal – first place	1993 Gothenburg	Team
Gold medal – first place	2000 Kuala Lumpur	Team
Silver medal – second place	1987 New Delhi	Team
Silver medal – second place	1989 Dortmund	Singles
Silver medal – second place	1995 Tianjin	Team
Silver medal – second place	1997 Manchester	Doubles
Bronze medal – third place	1991 Chiba	Doubles
Bronze medal – third place	2001 Osaka	Team
World Cup
Gold medal – first place	1990 Chiba	Team
Gold medal – first place	1991 Kuala Lumpur	Singles
Silver medal – second place	1991 Barcelona	Team
Silver medal – second place	1994 Nimes	Team
European Championships
Gold medal – first place	1986 Prague	Singles
Gold medal – first place	1986 Prague	Team
Gold medal – first place	1988 Paris	Team
Gold medal – first place	1990 Gothenburg	Team
Gold medal – first place	1992 Stuttgart	Doubles
Gold medal – first place	1992 Stuttgart	Team
Gold medal – first place	1996 Bratislava	Doubles
Gold medal – first place	1996 Bratislava	Team
Gold medal – first place	2000 Bremen	Team
Silver medal – second place	1996 Bratislava	Singles
Bronze medal – third place	1988 Paris	Doubles
Bronze medal – third place	1998 Eindhoven	Doubles
Bronze medal – third place	1998 Eindhoven	Team
Bronze medal – third place	2003 Courmayeur	Team

Jörgen Persson (born 22 April 1966) is a Swedish former table tennis player.

== Career ==
In two memorable World Table Tennis Championships finals he faced fellow Swede Jan-Ove Waldner in 1989 and 1991, losing the former and winning the latter. He also won four World Championship titles in Team.

Persson represented Sweden in every Olympic Games from when table tennis was introduced into the Olympic program in 1988 until 2012. After the 2012 Olympics he officially retired. Along with Croatian Zoran Primorac and Belgian Jean-Michel Saive, he was the first table tennis player to have competed at seven Olympic Games. His game is based on a powerful backhand stroke and a regular forehand.

His best Olympic result is a fourth place at the 2000 Summer Olympics and 2008 Summer Olympics. At the latter, he was the best non-Chinese in the entire event.

== Post-retirement ==
Persson is the national table tennis team coach for Sweden, which was the winning team at the 2023 European Championships in Malmö . It was the first time in a whole 21 years that Sweden stood as winners in a team event in table tennis. The players in the Swedish team consisted of Truls Möregårdh, Mattias Falck, Anton Källberg, Kristian Karlsson, and Jon Persson.

On 20 September 2023, Persson announced that he would make a comeback as a player in Kosta SK in the coming season.

== See also ==
- List of table tennis players
- List of athletes with the most appearances at Olympic Games
