= Chu Jong-chol =

North Korean table tennis player

Chu Jong-Chol
Personal information
- Nationality: North Korea
Medal record
Representing North Korea
World Table Tennis Championships
Bronze medal – third place	1987	Men's Team
Bronze medal – third place	1989	Men's Team

Chu Jong-Chol is a male former international table tennis player from North Korea.

He won a bronze medal at the 1987 World Table Tennis Championships in the Swaythling Cup (men's team event) with Hong Chol, Kim Song-hui and Li Gun-Sang for North Korea.

Two years later he won another bronze at the 1989 World Table Tennis Championships with Kim Song-hui, Li Gun-Sang and Yun Mun-Song.

== See also ==
- List of table tennis players
- List of World Table Tennis Championships medalists
