= Ding Song =

Chinese table tennis player

Personal information
- Full name: DING Song
- Nationality: China
- Born: 5 September 1971 (age 54)

Sport
- Sport: Table tennis
Medal record
Men's table tennis
Representing China
World Championships
Gold medal – first place	1997 Manchester	Team
Bronze medal – third place	1995 Tianjin	Singles
Gold medal – first place	1995 Tianjin	Team
World Cup
Gold medal – first place	1994 Nimes	Team

Ding Song (Chinese: 丁松; pinyin: Dīng Sōng; born 1971) is a former male Chinese table tennis player, he is famous due to his eccentric "modern defensive" style. He is best known for defeating Swedish former world champion Peter Karlsson in the men's team final of the World Table Tennis Championships in 1995, thereby securing China's final victory. He also made it to the men's singles semifinals before eventually losing to teammate Kong Linghui, who is skilled in defeating defensive players.

Ding Song is distinguished from other "traditional" defensive players by his unreasonably frequent and powerful counterattacks, almost as aggressive as offensive players', although sometimes he also confuses his opponents with oddly spinning chops just like other choppers.

He retired from the Chinese team after the 1997 WTTC.

After playing in German leagues for a few years, Ding Song returned to China in 2003 and played in the China Table Tennis Super League till 2007. He enrolled in Shanghai Jiao Tong University in 2006, majoring in human resource management. In June 2009 he received a bachelor's degree, and started working in SJTU as the coach of the university's team.

He is not to be confused with Ding Sǒng 丁悚 (1891–1972), the famous Chinese cartoonist: see zh:丁悚.

== See also ==
- List of table tennis players
