= Rika Sato =

Japanese table tennis player

Personal information
- Nationality: Japanese
- Born: 12 November 1971 (age 53); Sendai, Japan

Sport
- Sport: Table tennis

Rika Sato (佐藤 利香, Satō Rika; born 12 November 1971) is a Japanese table tennis player. She competed at the 1992 Summer Olympics and the 1996 Summer Olympics.
