= Ri Gun-sang =

North Korean table tennis player

Personal information
- Nationality: North Korea
- Born: 5 February 1966 (age 60)
Medal record
Representing North Korea
World Table Tennis Championships
Bronze medal – third place	1987 New Dehli	Men's Team
Bronze medal – third place	1989 Dortmund	Men's Team

Ri Gun-sang (born February 5, 1966) is a former international table tennis player from North Korea.

He won a bronze medal at the 1987 World Table Tennis Championships in the Swaythling Cup (men's team event) with Hong Chol, Kim Song-hui and Chu Jong-Chol for North Korea.

Two years later he won another bronze at the 1989 World Table Tennis Championships with Kim Song-hui, Chu Jong-Chol and Yun Mun-Song.

He competed in the 1992 Olympics and 1996 Olympics.

== See also ==
- List of table tennis players
- List of World Table Tennis Championships medalists
