= Li Jun (table tennis) =

Chinese table tennis player

Medal record
Representing China
World Table Tennis Championships
Bronze medal – third place	1989	Women's Doubles
Bronze medal – third place	1991	Women's Doubles
Representing Japan
World Table Tennis Championships
Bronze medal – third place	2001	Women's Team

Li Jun (born 30 June 1967) is a female Chinese former international table tennis player. She later represented Japan under the name Junko Haneyoshi.

She won bronze medal's at the 1989 World Table Tennis Championships and the 1991 World Table Tennis Championships in the women's doubles with Ding Yaping.

== See also ==
- List of table tennis players
- List of World Table Tennis Championships medalists
