= Ding Yaping =

German table tennis player

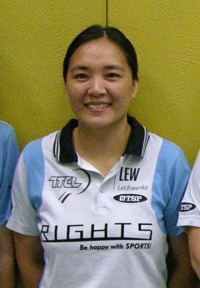

Personal information
- Nationality: China Germany
- Born: 13 April 1967 (age 59)
Medal record
Representing China
World Table Tennis Championships
Bronze medal – third place	1989	Women's Doubles
Bronze medal – third place	1991	Women's Doubles

Ding Yaping (born in 1967), not to be confused with Deng Yaping, is a female Chinese and German former international table tennis player.

She won bronze medal's at the 1989 World Table Tennis Championships and the 1991 World Table Tennis Championships in the women's doubles with Li Jun.

She later represented Germany.

== See also ==
- List of table tennis players
- List of World Table Tennis Championships medalists
