= Yu Shentong =

Chinese table tennis player

Personal information
- Nationality: China
- Born: 8 June 1968 (age 58)
Medal record
Representing China
World Table Tennis Championships
Bronze medal – third place	1989	singles
Silver medal – second place	1989	team

Yu Shentong (Chinese: 于沈潼, born 8 June 1968) is a Chinese former table tennis player who played at the 1992 Summer Olympics.

== Table tennis career ==
He won two World Championship medals; a bronze medal in the men's singles at the 1989 World Table Tennis Championships and a silver medal in the men's team event.

== See also ==
- List of table tennis players
- List of World Table Tennis Championships medalists
