= Hu Xiaoxin =

Chinese table tennis player

Personal information
- Full name: Hu Xiaoxin
- Nationality: China
- Born: 1966 (age 59–60)

Sport
- Sport: Table tennis
Medal record
Women's table tennis
Representing China
World Championships
Bronze medal – third place	1991 Chiba City	Doubles
Silver medal – second place	1989 Dortmund	Doubles
Gold medal – first place	1989 Dortmund	Team

Hu Xiaoxin is a former female international table tennis player from China.

== Table tennis career ==
She won a gold medal at the 1989 World Table Tennis Championships in the Corbillon Cup (women's team event) with Chen Jing, Chen Zihe and Li Huifen for China.

In addition she won a silver medal in the women's doubles in 1989 with Chen Jing and a bronze medal in the women's doubles with Liu Wei at the 1991 World Table Tennis Championships.

== See also ==
- List of table tennis players
- List of World Table Tennis Championships medalists
