= Hong Soon-hwa =

South Korean table tennis player

Personal information
- Nationality: South Korea
- Born: 3 June 1968 (age 58)
Medal record
Table tennis
Representing South Korea
World Championships
Silver medal – second place	1987 New Delhi	Women's team
Silver medal – second place	1989 Dortmund	Women's team
Bronze medal – third place	1993 Göteborg	Women's team

Hong Soon-hwa (born 3 June 1968) is a former international table tennis player from South Korea.

== Table tennis career ==
She won three medals for South Korea at the World Table Tennis Championships in the Corbillon Cup (women's team event).

She represented South Korea during the 1992 Olympic Games.

== See also ==
- List of World Table Tennis Championships medalists
