= Erik Lindh (table tennis) =

Swedish table tennis player (born 1964)

Personal information
- Full name: Erik Gunnar Lindh
- Nationality: Sweden
- Born: 24 May 1964 (age 62) Kungälv, Sweden

Sport
- Sport: Table tennis
- Playing style: Shake hands grip
Medal record
Men's table tennis
Representing Sweden
Olympic Games
Bronze medal – third place	1988 Seoul	Singles
World Championships
Gold medal – first place	1989 Dortmund	Team
Gold medal – first place	1991 Chiba City	Team
Gold medal – first place	1993 Gothenburg	Team
Silver medal – second place	1983 Tokyo	Team
Silver medal – second place	1985 Gothenburg	Team
Silver medal – second place	1987 New Delhi	Team
Silver medal – second place	1995 Tianjin	Team
Bronze medal – third place	1991 Chiba City	Doubles
Bronze medal – third place	1995 Tianjin	Mixed Doubles
World Cup
Gold medal – first place	1990 Hokkaido,Aomori,Niig	Team
Silver medal – second place	1991 Barcelona	Team
European Championships
Gold medal – first place	1980 Berne	Team
Gold medal – first place	1986 Prague	Doubles
Gold medal – first place	1986 Prague	Team
Gold medal – first place	1988 Paris	Team
Gold medal – first place	1990 Gothenburg	Team
Gold medal – first place	1992 Stuttgart	Doubles
Gold medal – first place	1992 Stuttgart	Team
Gold medal – first place	1996 Bratislava	Team
Silver medal – second place	1984 Moscow	Doubles
Silver medal – second place	1994 Birmingham	Team
Silver medal – second place	1998 Eindhoven	Mixed Doubles
Bronze medal – third place	1982 Budapest	Doubles
Bronze medal – third place	1988 Paris	Doubles
Bronze medal – third place	1998 Eindhoven	Team

Erik Lindh (born 24 May 1964) is a Swedish former table tennis player who competed in the 1988 Summer Olympics and in the 1992 Summer Olympics.

In the 1988 Summer Olympics in Seoul, he finished in third place and won the bronze medal.

He was a member of the winning Swedish teams in the 1989, 1991, and 1993 World Table Tennis Team Championships.

He also won an English Open title.

Lindh was a pioneer of the style of looping the ball very early – often straight after the bounce.

== See also ==
- List of table tennis players
- List of World Table Tennis Championships medalists
