= Deng Yaping =

Chinese table tennis player (born 1973)

Deng Yaping OLY
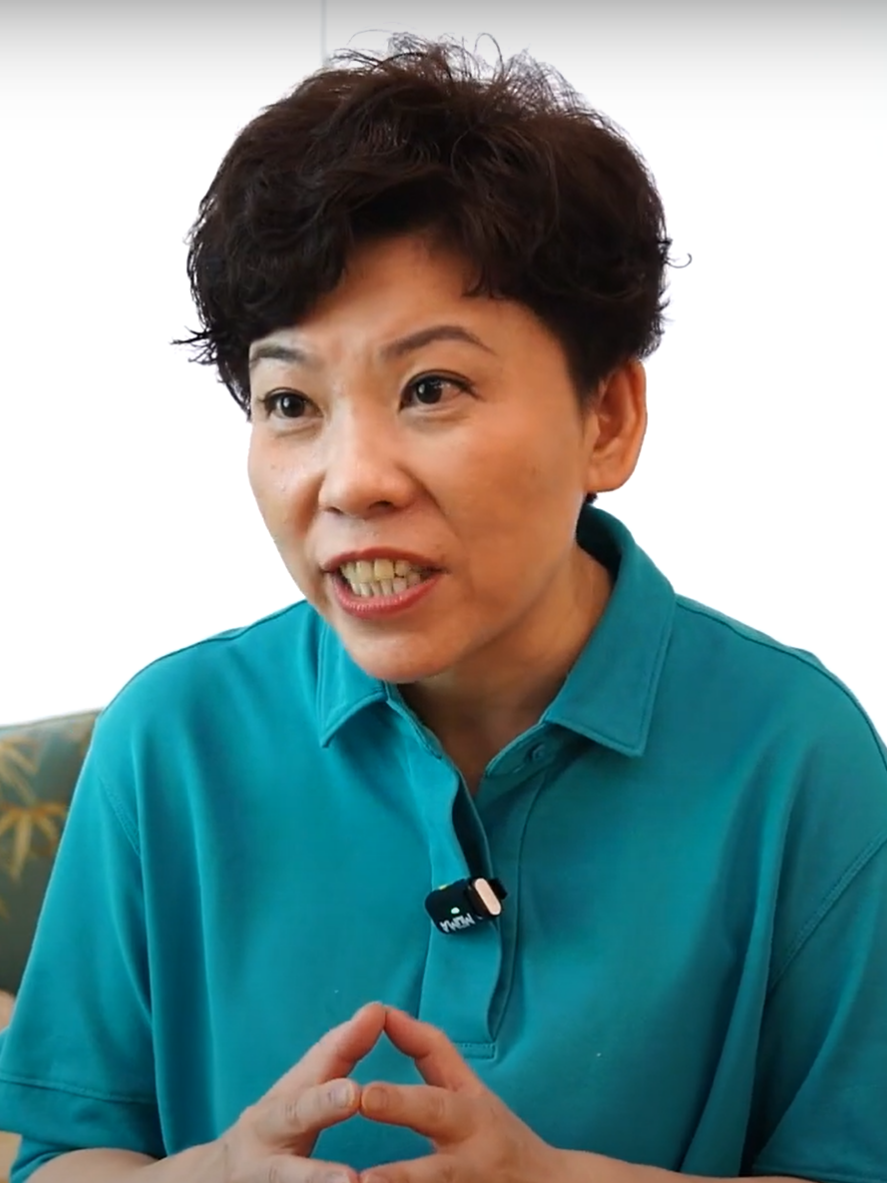
- Deng Yaping in 2023

Personal information
- Native name: 邓亚萍
- Nationality: Chinese
- Born: 5 February 1973 (age 53) Zhengzhou, Henan, China
- Height: 1.5 m (4 ft 11 in)

Sport
- Sport: Table tennis
Medal record
Women's table tennis
Representing China
Event	1st	2nd	3rd
Olympic Games	4	0	0
World Championships	9	5	0
World Cup	5	0	1
Total	18	5	1
Olympic Games
Gold medal – first place	1992 Barcelona	Singles
Gold medal – first place	1992 Barcelona	Doubles
Gold medal – first place	1996 Atlanta	Singles
Gold medal – first place	1996 Atlanta	Doubles
World Championships
Gold medal – first place	1989 Dortmund	Doubles
Gold medal – first place	1991 Chiba City	Singles
Gold medal – first place	1993 Gothenburg	Team
Gold medal – first place	1995 Tianjin	Singles
Gold medal – first place	1995 Tianjin	Doubles
Gold medal – first place	1995 Tianjin	Team
Gold medal – first place	1997 Manchester	Singles
Gold medal – first place	1997 Manchester	Doubles
Gold medal – first place	1997 Manchester	Team
Silver medal – second place	1991 Chiba City	Doubles
Silver medal – second place	1991 Chiba City	Team
Silver medal – second place	1993 Gothenburg	Doubles
Silver medal – second place	1995 Tianjin	Mixed doubles
Silver medal – second place	1997 Manchester	Mixed doubles
World Cup
Gold medal – first place	1990 Hokkaido, Aomori, Niig	Team
Gold medal – first place	1991 Barcelona	Team
Gold medal – first place	1995 Atlanta	Team
Gold medal – first place	1992 Las Vegas	Doubles
Gold medal – first place	1996 Hong Kong	Singles
Bronze medal – third place	1990 Seoul	Doubles
Asian Championships
Gold medal – first place	1994 Tianjin	Singles
Gold medal – first place	1994 Tianjin	Mixed doubles
Gold medal – first place	1994 Tianjin	Team
Silver medal – second place	1994 Tianjin	Doubles

Deng Yaping (Chinese: 邓亚萍; pinyin: Dèng Yàpíng; born February 5, 1973) is a Chinese table tennis player who won eighteen world championships including four Olympic championships between 1989 and 1997. She is regarded as one of the greatest players in the history of the sport.

== Early life and education ==
Deng was born in Zhengzhou, Henan, on February 5, 1973.

== Career ==
Deng began playing table tennis at age five, and four years later she won the provincial junior championship. She was age 13 when she won her first national championship.

Despite her success, she was initially denied a spot on the national team because she was so short (she stood only 1.5 metres [4 feet 11 inches] tall). She was finally included on the national team in 1988. She teamed with Qiao Hong to win her first world championship title in the women's doubles competition in 1989. Two years later in 1991, Deng won her first singles world championship.

At the 1992 Olympics in Barcelona, Spain, she won a gold medal in both the singles and doubles competitions and repeated the feat at the 1996 Olympics in Atlanta, USA. She also earned singles and doubles titles at the 1995 and 1997 world championships.

When she retired at the age of 24, she had won more titles than any other player in this sport, including four Olympic gold medals, and had been World Champion 18 times. From 1990 to 1997, she retained the title of world No. 1 ranked female table tennis player for eight years. She was voted Chinese female athlete of the century, and joined the International Table Tennis Federation Hall of Fame in 2003.

=== Successes ===
- 40th World Table Tennis Championship (1989) - women's double gold
- 1st Table Tennis World Cup (1990) - women's team gold
- 41st World Table Tennis Championship (1991) - women's single gold, women's team silver, women's double silver
- 2nd Table Tennis World Cup (1991–1992) - women's team gold, women's double gold
- 25th Olympic Games (1992) - table tennis women's single gold, women's double gold
- 42nd World Table Tennis Championship (1993) - women's team gold, women's double silver
- 43rd World Table Tennis Championship (1995) - women's team gold, women's single gold, women's double gold, mixed double silver
- 4th Table Tennis World Cup (1995) - women's team gold
- 26th Olympic Games (1996) - table tennis women's single gold, women's double gold
- 5th Table Tennis World Cup (1996) - women's single gold
- 44th World Table Tennis Championship (1997) - women's team gold, women's single gold, women's double gold, mixed double silver

== Post-playing career ==
Deng is still deeply involved with the national Chinese table tennis scene and frequently speaks to the media. She also was a color-commentator for the Women's World Cup in 2020.

In June 2021, Deng claimed that Mima Ito was not a serious threat to the Chinese women's Olympic hopes.

Deng was the CEO of Jike Search, a state-run search engine. Jike Search failed in 2013.

== Personal and political life ==
After retiring at the end of the 1997 season, Deng served on the International Olympic Committee's ethics and athletes commissions. She is also a member of the elite Laureus World Sports Academy, and a member of the Chinese People's Political Consultative Conference.

She gained a bachelor's degree from Tsinghua University, an MRes degree in Contemporary Chinese Studies from the University of Nottingham in 2002, and a PhD degree in Land Economy from the University of Cambridge (Jesus College) in 2008. Her thesis title is: "Olympic branding and global competition: the case of the Beijing 2008 Olympic Games". Her research work coincides with her professional focus on the marketing, management and development of the 2008 Beijing Olympics as a member of the Beijing Organizing Committee for the Olympic Games.

In 2007, she married Lin Zhigang, also a table tennis player, and later gave birth to a baby boy.

In 2010, she attracted controversy due to comments she made. A student asked her, "how can one get promoted quickly?" She answered, "when your personal value overlaps with the interests of the state, your value will be enlarged without limit." Later, she said, "In the 62 years since the establishment of the People's Republic of China, the People's Daily have not published a single piece of fake news."

In 2013, she was awarded an honorary DLitt degree from the University of Nottingham Ningbo China.
