= Kim Song-hui (table tennis) =

North Korean table tennis player (born 1968)

Personal information
- Nationality: North Korea
- Born: 25 November 1968 (age 57)
Medal record
Representing North Korea
World Table Tennis Championships
Bronze medal – third place	1987	Men's Team
Bronze medal – third place	1989	Men's Team
Representing Unified Korea
World Table Tennis Championships
Bronze medal – third place	1991	Mixed Doubles

- Kim Song-hui
- Hangul: 김성희
- RR: Gim Seonghui
- MR: Kim Sŏnghŭi

Kim Song-hui (Korean: 김성희; born 25 November 1968) is a male North Korean former international table tennis player.

He won a bronze medal at the 1987 World Table Tennis Championships and 1989 World Table Tennis Championships in the men's team event. Two years later he won another bronze medal at the 1991 in the mixed doubles with Ri Pun-hui as part of the unified Korean team. He also competed at the 1992 Summer Olympics and the 1996 Summer Olympics.

He married Ri on 27 September 1992 in a ceremony in Pyongyang after getting engaged to her in June that year.

== See also ==
- List of table tennis players
