= Hyun Jung-hwa =

South Korean table tennis player (born 1969)

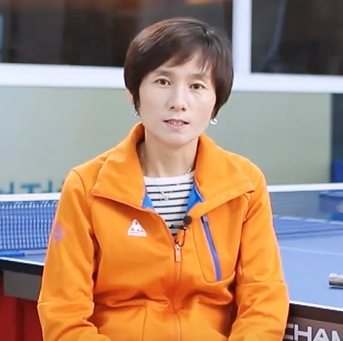
- Hyun Jung-hwa in 2018

Personal information
- Full name: Hyun Jung-Hwa
- Nationality: South Korea
- Born: 6 October 1969 (age 56) Busan, South Korea
- Height: 1.66 m (5 ft 5 in)
- Weight: 52 kg (115 lb)

Sport
- Sport: Table tennis
- Playing style: Right-handed, penhold grip
Medal record
Women's table tennis
Representing South Korea
Olympic Games
Gold medal – first place	1988 Seoul	Doubles
Bronze medal – third place	1992 Barcelona	Singles
Bronze medal – third place	1992 Barcelona	Doubles
World Championships
Gold medal – first place	1987 New Delhi	Doubles
Gold medal – first place	1989 Dortmund	Mixed Doubles
Gold medal – first place	1993 Gothenburg	Singles
Silver medal – second place	1987 New Delhi	Team
Silver medal – second place	1989 Dortmund	Team
Silver medal – second place	1993 Gothenburg	Mixed Doubles
Bronze medal – third place	1989 Dortmund	Singles
Bronze medal – third place	1993 Gothenburg	Team
World Cup
Gold medal – first place	1990 Seoul	Doubles
Silver medal – second place	1991 Barcelona	Team
Silver medal – second place	1992 Las Vegas	Doubles
Bronze medal – third place	1990 Chiba City	Team
Asian Games
Gold medal – first place	1986 Seoul	Team
Gold medal – first place	1990 Beijing	Doubles
Silver medal – second place	1990 Beijing	Mixed Doubles
Silver medal – second place	1990 Beijing	Team
Bronze medal – third place	1986 Seoul	Doubles
Bronze medal – third place	1986 Seoul	Mixed Doubles
Asian Championships
Gold medal – first place	1988 Niigata	Doubles
Gold medal – first place	1988 Niigata	Mixed Doubles
Gold medal – first place	1988 Niigata	Team
Gold medal – first place	1990 Kuala Lumpur	Mixed Doubles
Gold medal – first place	1990 Kuala Lumpur	Team
Silver medal – second place	1986 Shenzhen	Mixed Doubles
Bronze medal – third place	1988 Niigata	Singles
Bronze medal – third place	1990 Kuala Lumpur	Doubles
Representing Korea
World Championships
Gold medal – first place	1991 Chiba City	Team

Korean name
- Hangul: 현정화
- Hanja: 玄静和
- RR: Hyeon Jeonghwa
- MR: Hyŏn Chŏnghwa

Hyun Jung-hwa (Korean: 현정화; born October 6, 1969, in Busan, South Korea) is a retired table tennis player from South Korea who competed in the 1988 Summer Olympics, and in the 1992 Summer Olympics.

== Career ==
National South Korean table tennis player Hyun Jung-Hwa brought about the golden age of table tennis to Korea. She is one of an elite group of players who have won at least one gold medal in every discipline they were eligible to compete in at the World Table Tennis Championships. Her first gold medal came in the women's doubles (partnering Yang Young-Ja) at the 1987 World Table Tennis Championships in New Delhi. She followed it up by winning the mixed doubles title with Yoo Nam-Kyu at the 1989 World Table Tennis Championships in Dortmund. During 1988 Seoul Olympics, she led the South Korean team to victory against the unbeatable Chinese team. She was again part of the first ever Unified Korean team that stunned China to win the women's team event at the 1991 World Table Tennis Championships in Chiba. Her final World title was an unexpected win in the women's singles event at the 1993 World Table Tennis Championships in Gothenburg, where she also brought home medals in the mixed doubles and team event, making her the only Korean to achieve a Grand Slam. In 2011, she became the first Korean table tennis player to be inducted into the International Table Tennis Federation's Hall of Fame.

== Notable achievements ==
- Hall of Fame Inductee, International Table Tennis Federation
- Executive Director, Korea Table Tennis Association
- Table Tennis Director, Korean Racing Authority
- Head Coach, South Korean national team

== In popular culture ==
=== Film ===
The story of the Unified Korean team in the 1991 World Championships and its victory over the Chinese in the women's team event is told by the movie As One starring actress Ha Ji-won as Hyun Jung-Hwa.

== Television appearances ==
- 2020: King of Mask Singer (MBC), contestant as "Libra" (episode 251)
- 2021: Hospital Playlist Season 2 (tvN), cameo. Yulje hospital hosts a departmental table tennis tournament every year. Hyun appears as one of the Department of Nuclear Medicine doctors, and easily wins the championship with her partner, Joo Sae-hyuk. (episode 9)
- 2022: National University is National University (MBN, 2022); Participant

== See also ==
- List of table tennis players
