= Zoran Primorac =

Croatian table tennis player

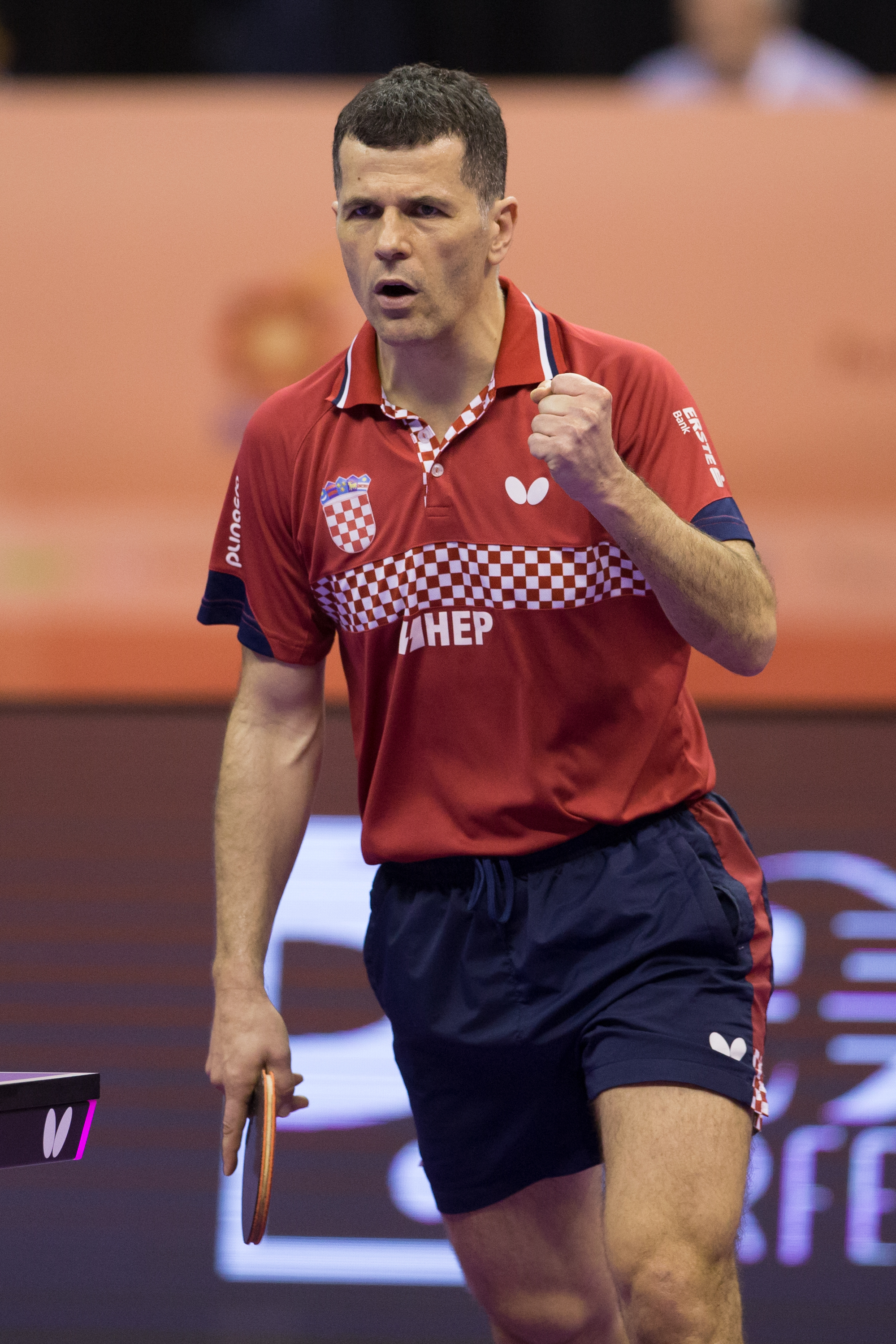
- Primorac at the 2016 World Team Table Tennis Championships

Personal information
- Nationality: Croatia
- Born: 10 May 1969 (age 57) Zadar, SR Croatia, Yugoslavia
- Height: 186 cm (6 ft 1 in)
- Weight: 80 kg (176 lb)

Sport
- Sport: Table tennis
- Playing style: Shakehand looper
- Equipment: Butterfly (Arylate Carbon) Custom blade; Butterfly Tenergy 05 (Red, FH); Butterfly Tenergy 05 (Black, BH)
- Highest ranking: 2nd place (1998) in ITTF World ranking
Medal record
Men's table tennis
Representing Yugoslavia
Olympic Games
Silver medal – second place	1988 Seoul	Men's doubles
World Championships
Silver medal – second place	1987 New Delhi	Men's doubles
Silver medal – second place	1991 Chiba	Men's team
Bronze medal – third place	1987 New Delhi	Men's team
European Championships
Gold medal – first place	1990 Göteborg	Men's doubles
Silver medal – second place	1988 Paris	Men's doubles
Bronze medal – third place	1986 Praha	Men's doubles
Bronze medal – third place	1990 Göteborg	Men's team
Mediterranean Games
Gold medal – first place	1987 Latakia	Men's doubles
Gold medal – first place	1987 Latakia	Men's singles
Gold medal – first place	1991 Athens	Men's doubles
Bronze medal – third place	1991 Athens	Men's singles
Representing Croatia
Table Tennis World Cup
Gold medal – first place	1993 Guangzhou	Men's singles
Gold medal – first place	1997 Nimes	Men's singles
Bronze medal – third place	1994 Taipei	Men's singles
Bronze medal – third place	1998 Shantou	Men's singles
Bronze medal – third place	1999 Xiaolan	Men's singles
Bronze medal – third place	2002 Jinan	Men's singles
World Championships
Silver medal – second place	1995 Tianjin	Men's doubles
Bronze medal – third place	1993 Göteborg	Men's singles
Bronze medal – third place	1999 Eindhoven	Men's doubles
European Championships
Gold medal – first place	1994 Birmingham	Mixed doubles
Silver medal – second place	1994 Birmingham	Men's doubles
Silver medal – second place	1998 Eindhoven	Men's singles
Silver medal – second place	2000 Bremen	Men's singles
Silver medal – second place	2007 Belgrade	Men's team
Bronze medal – third place	1992 Stuttgart	Men's singles
Bronze medal – third place	1992 Stuttgart	Mixed doubles
Bronze medal – third place	1994 Birmingham	Men's singles
Bronze medal – third place	2002 Zagreb	Men's singles
Bronze medal – third place	2005 Århus	Men's singles
Mediterranean Games
Silver medal – second place	1993 Languedoc	Men's singles
Silver medal – second place	1993 Languedoc	Men's doubles
Silver medal – second place	1997 Bari	Men's singles
Bronze medal – third place	1997 Bari	Men's doubles

Zoran Primorac /ˈzoʊrən ˈpriːməˌræts/ (born 10 May 1969) is a retired Croatian table tennis player. He is a two-time winner of the World Cup and one of only three table tennis players to have competed at seven Olympic Games. His highest ITTF world ranking was number 2, in 1998.

== Biography ==
Primorac was born in Zadar and started playing table tennis at the club STK "Bagat" in his home town. As a junior, he won seven medals at European championships. In 1985 he moved to the Zagreb club "Vjesnik", Caja Granada and UMMC Verkhnaya Pyshma. At the 1987 World Championship in New Delhi he won the silver medal together with Ilija Lupulesku, and repeated the success by winning the silver at the 1988 Summer Olympics in Seoul. Together with Lupulesku he also won the 1990 European Championship in Gothenburg.

Primorac competed for Croatia at the 1992 Summer Olympics in Barcelona where he reached last 16 in singles and doubles. He repeated the same at the 1996 Summer Olympics. At the 2004 Summer Olympics he was eliminated in the third round. At 2008 Summer Olympics Primorac lost in the quarter-final of the men's singles event to Jörgen Persson.

Primorac, Belgian Jean-Michel Saive, and Swede Jörgen Persson are the first table tennis players to have competed at seven Olympics, having competed in all Games since the sport was introduced in 1988.

In 1993 he won a bronze medal in Men's singles at World Table Tennis Championships. He won silver medal in 1995 and bronze in 1999 at World Championships in Men's doubles event.

At the 1998 and 2000 European Championships Primorac won silver medal in men's singles. In 1998 final he lost against Vladimir Samsonov and in 2000 he lost against Peter Karlsson. At the 1992, 1994, 2002 and 2005 European Championship he won the bronze medal in men's singles. At the 2007 European Championship in Belgrade he won the silver medal in the team event with Croatia (with Roko Tošić, Andrej Gaćina and Tan Ruiwu).

At the Mediterranean Games in the men's singles event he won gold medal in 1987, silver in 1993 and 1997 and bronze in 1991. In the men's doubles event he won gold medals in 1987 and 1991, silver in 1993 and bronze in 1997.

He currently uses specially designed equipment made by Butterfly Table Tennis. He uses the Timo Boll spirit blade, while using Tenergy 05 rubber on both sides of his racket.

In the TV comedy The Office, the character Dwight Schrute names Zoran Primorac as one of his heroes, but pronounces his name incorrectly.

In 2018, Primorac was elected Chair of the ITTF Athletes Commission.

== Achievements ==
Year	Competition	Venue	Placed	Event
1988	Olympic Games	(South Korea) Seoul	Silver	Men's doubles
1993	World Cup	(China) Guangzhou	Gold	Men's singles
1997	World Cup	(France) Nimes	Gold	Men's singles
1994	World Cup	(Chinese Taipei) Taipei	Bronze	Men's singles
1998	World Cup	(China) Shantou	Bronze	Men's singles
1999	World Cup	(China) Xiaolan	Bronze	Men's singles
2002	World Cup	(China) Jinan	Bronze	Men's singles
1987	World Championships	(India) New Delhi	Bronze	Men's team
1987	World Championships	(India) New Delhi	Silver	Men's doubles
1991	World Championships	(Japan) Chiba	Silver	Men's team
1993	World Championships	(Sweden) Gothenburg	Bronze	Men's singles
1995	World Championships	(China) Tianjin	Silver	Men's doubles
1999	World Championships	(Netherlands) Eindhoven	Bronze	Men's doubles
1986	European Championships	(Czechoslovakia) Prague	Bronze	Men's doubles
1988	European Championships	(France) Paris	Silver	Men's doubles
1990	European Championships	(Sweden) Gothenburg	Bronze	Men's team
1990	European Championships	(Sweden) Gothenburg	Gold	Men's doubles
1992	European Championships	(Germany) Stuttgart	Bronze	Men's singles
1992	European Championships	(Germany) Stuttgart	Bronze	Mixed doubles
1994	European Championships	(United Kingdom) Birmingham	Bronze	Men's singles
1994	European Championships	(United Kingdom) Birmingham	Silver	Men's doubles
1994	European Championships	(United Kingdom) Birmingham	Gold	Mixed doubles
1998	European Championships	(Netherlands) Eindhoven	Silver	Men's singles
2000	European Championships	(Germany) Bremen	Silver	Men's singles
2002	European Championships	(Croatia) Zagreb	Bronze	Men's singles
2005	European Championships	(Denmark) Aarhus	Bronze	Men's singles
2007	European Championships	(Serbia) Belgrade	Silver	Men's team

== See also ==
- List of athletes with the most appearances at Olympic Games
- List of flag bearers for Croatia at the Olympics

Olympic Games
Preceded by Perica Bukić	Flagbearer for Croatia; Sydney 2000	Succeeded by Dubravko Šimenc
