= Qiao Hong =

Chinese table tennis player

Personal information
- Full name: Qiao Hong
- Nationality: China
- Born: 21 November 1968 (age 57) Wuhan, Hubei, China

Sport
- Sport: Table tennis
Medal record
Women's table tennis
Representing China
Olympic Games
Gold medal – first place	1992 Barcelona	Doubles
Gold medal – first place	1996 Atlanta	Doubles
Silver medal – second place	1992 Barcelona	Singles
Bronze medal – third place	1996 Atlanta	Singles

Qiao Hong (simplified Chinese: 乔红; traditional Chinese: 喬紅; pinyin: Qiáo Hóng; born November 21, 1968, in Wuhan, Hubei) is a former female Chinese table tennis player. She is now the coach of the women's national table tennis team and a member of the Chinese Olympic Committee.

== Table tennis career ==
She won four Olympic medals including two gold medals. Her ten World Championship medals included five gold medals.

She was ranked second by the International Table Tennis Federation (ITTF) for a long time, Qiao Hong and long-time world No. 1 Deng Yaping formed one of the most feared double combos. She joined ITTF Hall of Fame in 2005.

== See also ==
- List of table tennis players
- List of World Table Tennis Championships medalists
