= Chen Zihe =

Chinese table tennis player

Personal information
- Nationality: China
- Born: 29 February 1968 (age 58)

Sport
- Sport: Table tennis
Medal record
Women's table tennis
Representing China
Silver medal – second place	1992 Barcelona	Doubles

Chen Zihe (Chinese: 陈子荷; born 29 February 1968) is a Chinese international table tennis player.

== Table tennis career ==
She won a silver medal at the 1992 Summer Olympics in the women's double event with Gao Jun.

She has won six World Championship medals including three gold medals; two in the team event and one in the doubles with Gao Jun.

== See also ==
- List of table tennis players
- List of World Table Tennis Championships medalists
