= 1993 World Table Tennis Championships =

1993 edition of the World Table Tennis Championships

The 1993 World Table Tennis Championships were held in Gothenburg from May 11 to May 23, 1993.

== Results ==
=== Team ===
Event	Gold	Silver	Bronze
Swaythling Cup; Men's Team	Sweden; Mikael Appelgren; Peter Karlsson; Erik Lindh; Jörgen Persson; Jan-Ove Waldner	China; Liu Guoliang; Lü Lin; Ma Wenge; Wang Hao; Wang Tao; Zhang Lei	Germany; Oliver Alke; Steffen Fetzner; Peter Franz; Richard Prause; Jörg Roßkopf
Corbillon Cup; Women's Team	China; Chen Zihe; Deng Yaping; Gao Jun; Qiao Hong	North Korea; An Hui-Suk; Li Bun-Hui; Wi Bok-Sun; Yu Sun-bok	South Korea; Hong Cha-Ok; Hong Soon-hwa; Hyun Jung-Hwa; Park Hae-Jung

=== Individual ===
Event	Gold	Silver	Bronze
Men's singles	(France) Jean-Philippe Gatien	(Belgium) Jean-Michel Saive	(Croatia) Zoran Primorac
Men's singles	(France) Jean-Philippe Gatien	(Belgium) Jean-Michel Saive	(Sweden) Jan-Ove Waldner
Women's singles	(South Korea) Hyun Jung-Hwa	(Chinese Taipei) Chen Jing	(Romania) Otilia Bădescu
Women's singles	(South Korea) Hyun Jung-Hwa	(Chinese Taipei) Chen Jing	(China) Gao Jun
Men's doubles	(China) Lü Lin (China) Wang Tao	(China) Ma Wenge (China) Zhang Lei	(South Korea) Kim Taek-Soo (South Korea) Yoo Nam-Kyu
Men's doubles	(China) Lü Lin (China) Wang Tao	(China) Ma Wenge (China) Zhang Lei	(China) Lin Zhigang (China) Liu Guoliang
Women's doubles	(China) Liu Wei (China) Qiao Yunping	(China) Deng Yaping (China) Qiao Hong	(China) Chen Zihe (China) Gao Jun
Women's doubles	(China) Liu Wei (China) Qiao Yunping	(China) Deng Yaping (China) Qiao Hong	(Hong Kong) Chai Po Wa (Hong Kong) Chan Tan Lui
Mixed doubles	(China) Wang Tao (China) Liu Wei	(South Korea) Yoo Nam-Kyu (South Korea) Hyun Jung-Hwa	(China) Ma Wenge (China) Qiao Yunping
Mixed doubles	(China) Wang Tao (China) Liu Wei	(South Korea) Yoo Nam-Kyu (South Korea) Hyun Jung-Hwa	(North Korea) Li Sung Il (North Korea) Yu Sun-Bok
