= List of Olympic medalists in table tennis =

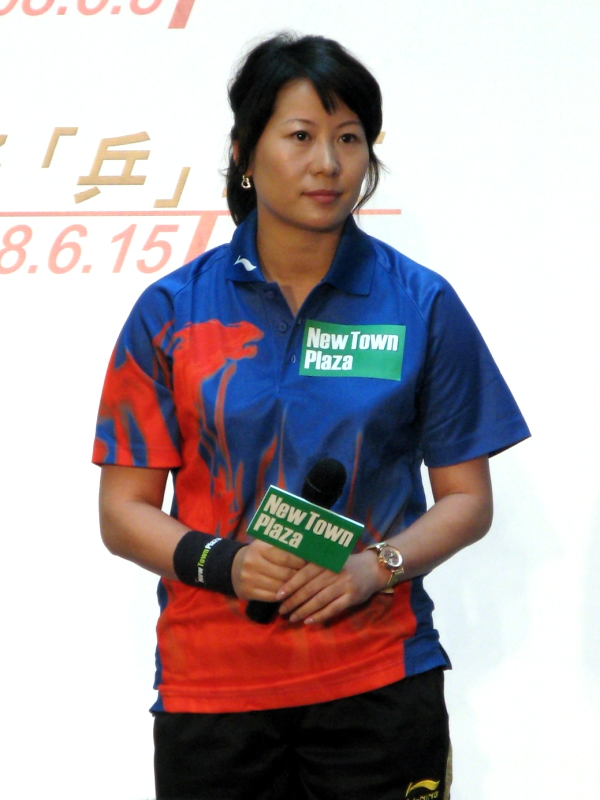
Chinese Li Ju, Olympic doubles champion and singles runner-up in 2000

Table tennis is among the sports contested at the Summer Olympic Games. It was introduced at the 1988 Summer Olympics in Seoul, South Korea, where singles and doubles tournaments were held for both genders. The men's and women's doubles events were dropped from the 2008 Summer Olympics program and replaced by team events. The competitions are conducted in accordance with the rules established by the International Table Tennis Federation (ITTF).

Ma Long (China) is the all-time Olympic medal leader, having won six golds. Dimitrij Ovtcharov (Germany) have won six medals in the men's competitions, while Ma Lin, Zhang Jike and Fan Zhendong (China) are the males with three gold medals. Wang Nan (China) is the best-performing athlete in the women's competitions, having won four golds—a figure shared with fellow Chinese players Deng Yaping, Zhang Yining and Chen Meng—and one silver medal. Twenty-one players have won at least four medals and six have won three. Chen Jing competed for China when she won her first two medals in 1988, and for Chinese Taipei when she gained her most recent two medals at the 1996 and 2000 Summer Olympics. Since 1992, the winner of the women's singles has also won the doubles or team event: Deng Yaping, in 1992 and 1996; Wang Nan, in 2000; Zhang Yining, in 2004 and 2008; Li Xiaoxia, in 2012; Ding Ning, in 2016; and Chen Meng, in 2020 and 2024. In the men's competition, Liu Guoliang (1996), Ma Lin (2008), Zhang Jike (2012), Ma Long (2016 and 2020) and Fan Zhendong (2024) have achieved this feat. Besides Deng Yaping, Zhang Yining, Chen Meng and Ma Long, no other female or male player has successfully defended their singles title, while in the doubles, back-to-back victories were achieved by Deng Yaping and Qiao Hong (1992, 1996), and Wang Nan (with Li Ju in 2000, and Zhang Yining in 2004).

China has been the most successful nation in Olympic table tennis, winning 66 medals (37 gold, 21 silver, and 8 bronze). Since 1992, Chinese players have won at least one medal in every event. At the 2008 Games, China achieved an unprecedented medal sweep in both the men's and women's singles tournaments, and won both team tournaments. With 20 medals, South Korea is second to China in the overall medal count. Japan is the third nation to have won double-digit medals. As of the 2024 Summer Olympics, 130 medals (42 gold, 42 silver, and 46 bronze) have been awarded to 118 players selected from 12 National Olympic Committees (NOC). Third-place matches were not held at the 1992 Summer Olympics, so all losing semifinalists were given bronze medals, resulting in four additional bronze medalists.

== Men ==
=== Men's singles ===
| Games | Gold | Silver | Bronze |
|---|---|---|---|
| 1988 Seoul | Yoo Nam-kyu; South Korea | Kim Ki-taik; South Korea | Erik Lindh; Sweden |
| 1992 Barcelona | Jan-Ove Waldner; Sweden | Jean-Philippe Gatien; France | Kim Taek-soo; South Korea; Ma Wenge; China |
| 1996 Atlanta | Liu Guoliang; China | Wang Tao; China | Jörg Roßkopf; Germany |
| 2000 Sydney | Kong Linghui; China | Jan-Ove Waldner; Sweden | Liu Guoliang; China |
| 2004 Athens | Ryu Seung-min; South Korea | Wang Hao; China | Wang Liqin; China |
| 2008 Beijing | Ma Lin; China | Wang Hao; China | Wang Liqin; China |
| 2012 London | Zhang Jike; China | Wang Hao; China | Dimitrij Ovtcharov; Germany |
| 2016 Rio de Janeiro | Ma Long; China | Zhang Jike; China | Jun Mizutani; Japan |
| 2020 Tokyo | Ma Long; China | Fan Zhendong; China | Dimitrij Ovtcharov; Germany |
| 2024 Paris | Fan Zhendong; China | Truls Möregårdh; Sweden | Félix Lebrun; France |
| 2028 Los Angeles | | | |

| Rank | Nation | Gold | Silver | Bronze | Total |
|---|---|---|---|---|---|
| 1 | China | 7 | 6 | 4 | 17 |
| 2 | South Korea | 2 | 1 | 1 | 4 |
| 3 | Sweden | 1 | 2 | 1 | 4 |
| 4 | France | 0 | 1 | 1 | 2 |
| 5 | Germany | 0 | 0 | 3 | 3 |
| 6 | Japan | 0 | 0 | 1 | 1 |
| Totals (6 entries) | | 10 | 10 | 11 | 31 |

=== Men's doubles ===
| Games | Gold | Silver | Bronze |
|---|---|---|---|
| 1988 Seoul | Chen Longcan and Wei Qingguang (CHN) | Ilija Lupulesku and Zoran Primorac (YUG) | Ahn Jae-hyung and Yoo Nam-kyu (KOR) |
| 1992 Barcelona | Lü Lin and Wang Tao (CHN) | Steffen Fetzner and Jörg Roßkopf (GER) | Kang Hee-chan and Lee Chul-seung (KOR) |
| 1992 Barcelona | Lü Lin and Wang Tao (CHN) | Steffen Fetzner and Jörg Roßkopf (GER) | Kim Taek-soo and Yoo Nam-kyu (KOR) |
| 1996 Atlanta | Liu Guoliang and Kong Linghui (CHN) | Lü Lin and Wang Tao (CHN) | Lee Chul-seung and Yoo Nam-kyu (KOR) |
| 2000 Sydney | Wang Liqin and Yan Sen (CHN) | Liu Guoliang and Kong Linghui (CHN) | Jean-Philippe Gatien and Patrick Chila (FRA) |
| 2004 Athens | Chen Qi and Ma Lin (CHN) | Ko Lai Chak and Li Ching (HKG) | Michael Maze and Finn Tugwell (DEN) |
| 2008-2024 | not included in the Olympic program | | |
| 2028 Los Angeles | | | |

| Rank | Nation | Gold | Silver | Bronze | Total |
|---|---|---|---|---|---|
| 1 | China | 5 | 2 | 0 | 7 |
| 2 | Germany | 0 | 1 | 0 | 1 |
| 2 | Hong Kong | 0 | 1 | 0 | 1 |
| 2 | Yugoslavia | 0 | 1 | 0 | 1 |
| 5 | South Korea | 0 | 0 | 4 | 4 |
| 6 | Denmark | 0 | 0 | 1 | 1 |
| 6 | France | 0 | 0 | 1 | 1 |
| Totals (7 entries) | | 5 | 5 | 6 | 16 |

== Women ==
=== Women's singles ===
| Games | Gold | Silver | Bronze |
|---|---|---|---|
| 1988 Seoul | Chen Jing; China | Li Huifen; China | Jiao Zhimin; China |
| 1992 Barcelona | Deng Yaping; China | Qiao Hong; China | Ri Pun-hui; North Korea; Hyun Jung-hwa; South Korea |
| 1996 Atlanta | Deng Yaping; China | Chen Jing; Chinese Taipei | Qiao Hong; China |
| 2000 Sydney | Wang Nan; China | Li Ju; China | Chen Jing; Chinese Taipei |
| 2004 Athens | Zhang Yining; China | Kim Hyang-mi; North Korea | Kim Kyung-ah; South Korea |
| 2008 Beijing | Zhang Yining; China | Wang Nan; China | Guo Yue; China |
| 2012 London | Li Xiaoxia; China | Ding Ning; China | Feng Tianwei; Singapore |
| 2016 Rio de Janeiro | Ding Ning; China | Li Xiaoxia; China | Kim Song-i; North Korea |
| 2020 Tokyo | Chen Meng; China | Sun Yingsha; China | Mima Ito; Japan |
| 2024 Paris | Chen Meng; China | Sun Yingsha; China | Hina Hayata; Japan |
| 2028 Los Angeles | | | |

| Rank | Nation | Gold | Silver | Bronze | Total |
|---|---|---|---|---|---|
| 1 | China | 10 | 8 | 3 | 21 |
| 2 | North Korea | 0 | 1 | 2 | 3 |
| 3 | Chinese Taipei | 0 | 1 | 1 | 2 |
| 4 | Japan | 0 | 0 | 2 | 2 |
| 4 | South Korea | 0 | 0 | 2 | 2 |
| 6 | Singapore | 0 | 0 | 1 | 1 |
| Totals (6 entries) | | 10 | 10 | 11 | 31 |

=== Women's doubles ===
| Games | Gold | Silver | Bronze |
|---|---|---|---|
| 1988 Seoul | Hyun Jung-hwa and Yang Young-ja (KOR) | Chen Jing and Jiao Zhimin (CHN) | Jasna Fazlić and Gordana Perkučin (YUG) |
| 1992 Barcelona | Deng Yaping and Qiao Hong (CHN) | Chen Zihe and Gao Jun (CHN) | Li Bun-Hui and Yu Sun-bok (PRK) |
| 1992 Barcelona | Deng Yaping and Qiao Hong (CHN) | Chen Zihe and Gao Jun (CHN) | Hyun Jung-hwa and Hong Cha-ok (KOR) |
| 1996 Atlanta | Deng Yaping and Qiao Hong (CHN) | Liu Wei and Qiao Yunping (CHN) | Park Hae-jung and Ryu Ji-hae (KOR) |
| 2000 Sydney | Li Ju and Wang Nan (CHN) | Sun Jin and Yang Ying (CHN) | Kim Moo-kyo and Ryu Ji-hae (KOR) |
| 2004 Athens | Wang Nan and Zhang Yining (CHN) | Lee Eun-sil and Seok Eun-mi (KOR) | Guo Yue and Niu Jianfeng (CHN) |
| 2008-2024 | not included in the Olympic program | | |
| 2028 Los Angeles | | | |

| Rank | Nation | Gold | Silver | Bronze | Total |
|---|---|---|---|---|---|
| 1 | China | 4 | 4 | 1 | 9 |
| 2 | South Korea | 1 | 1 | 3 | 5 |
| 3 | North Korea | 0 | 0 | 1 | 1 |
| 3 | Yugoslavia | 0 | 0 | 1 | 1 |
| Totals (4 entries) | | 5 | 5 | 6 | 16 |

== Mixed ==
=== Mixed doubles ===
| Games | Gold | Silver | Bronze |
|---|---|---|---|
| 2020 Tokyo | Jun Mizutani and Mima Ito (JPN) | Xu Xin and Liu Shiwen (CHN) | Lin Yun-ju and Cheng I-ching (TPE) |
| 2024 Paris | Wang Chuqin and Sun Yingsha (CHN) | Ri Jong-sik and Kim Kum-yong (PRK) | Lim Jong-hoon and Shin Yu-bin (KOR) |
| 2028 Los Angeles | | | |

| Rank | Nation | Gold | Silver | Bronze | Total |
|---|---|---|---|---|---|
| 1 | China | 1 | 1 | 0 | 2 |
| 2 | Japan | 1 | 0 | 0 | 1 |
| 3 | North Korea | 0 | 1 | 0 | 1 |
| 4 | Chinese Taipei | 0 | 0 | 1 | 1 |
| 4 | South Korea | 0 | 0 | 1 | 1 |
| Totals (5 entries) | | 2 | 2 | 2 | 6 |

=== Mixed teams ===
| Games | Gold | Silver | Bronze |
|---|---|---|---|
| 2028 Los Angeles | | | |

| Rank | Nation | Gold | Silver | Bronze | Total |
|---|---|---|---|---|---|
| Totals (0 entries) | | 0 | 0 | 0 | 0 |

== Discontinued ==
=== Men’s team ===
| Games | Gold | Silver | Bronze |
|---|---|---|---|
| 2008 Beijing | China; Ma Lin; Wang Hao; Wang Liqin | Germany; Timo Boll; Dimitrij Ovtcharov; Christian Süß | South Korea; Oh Sang-eun; Ryu Seung-min; Yoon Jae-young |
| 2012 London | China; Wang Hao; Zhang Jike; Ma Long | South Korea; Oh Sang-eun; Joo Se-hyuk; Ryu Seung-min | Germany; Timo Boll; Dimitrij Ovtcharov; Bastian Steger |
| 2016 Rio de Janeiro | China; Ma Long; Xu Xin; Zhang Jike | Japan; Koki Niwa; Jun Mizutani; Maharu Yoshimura | Germany; Bastian Steger; Dimitrij Ovtcharov; Timo Boll |
| 2020 Tokyo | China; Fan Zhendong; Ma Long; Xu Xin | Germany; Dimitrij Ovtcharov; Patrick Franziska; Timo Boll | Japan; Jun Mizutani; Koki Niwa; Tomokazu Harimoto |
| 2024 Paris | China; Wang Chuqin; Ma Long; Fan Zhendong | Sweden; Anton Källberg; Truls Möregårdh; Kristian Karlsson | France; Félix Lebrun; Alexis Lebrun; Simon Gauzy |

| Rank | Nation | Gold | Silver | Bronze | Total |
|---|---|---|---|---|---|
| 1 | China | 5 | 0 | 0 | 5 |
| 2 | Germany | 0 | 2 | 2 | 4 |
| 3 | Japan | 0 | 1 | 1 | 2 |
| 3 | South Korea | 0 | 1 | 1 | 2 |
| 5 | Sweden | 0 | 1 | 0 | 1 |
| 6 | France | 0 | 0 | 1 | 1 |
| Totals (6 entries) | | 5 | 5 | 5 | 15 |

=== Women's team ===
| Games | Gold | Silver | Bronze |
|---|---|---|---|
| 2008 Beijing | China; Guo Yue; Wang Nan; Zhang Yining | Singapore; Feng Tianwei; Li Jiawei; Wang Yuegu | South Korea; Dang Ye-seo; Kim Kyung-ah; Park Mi-young |
| 2012 London | China; Ding Ning; Guo Yue; Li Xiaoxia | Japan; Ai Fukuhara; Kasumi Ishikawa; Sayaka Hirano | Singapore; Feng Tianwei; Li Jiawei; Wang Yuegu |
| 2016 Rio de Janeiro | China; Liu Shiwen; Ding Ning; Li Xiaoxia | Germany; Han Ying; Petrissa Solja; Shan Xiaona | Japan; Ai Fukuhara; Kasumi Ishikawa; Mima Ito |
| 2020 Tokyo | China; Chen Meng; Sun Yingsha; Wang Manyu | Japan; Mima Ito; Kasumi Ishikawa; Miu Hirano | Hong Kong; Doo Hoi Kem; Lee Ho Ching; Minnie Soo |
| 2024 Paris | China; Sun Yingsha; Wang Manyu; Chen Meng | Japan; Hina Hayata; Miwa Harimoto; Miu Hirano | South Korea; Shin Yu-bin; Jeon Ji-hee; Lee Eun-hye |

| Rank | Nation | Gold | Silver | Bronze | Total |
|---|---|---|---|---|---|
| 1 | China | 5 | 0 | 0 | 5 |
| 2 | Japan | 0 | 3 | 1 | 4 |
| 3 | Singapore | 0 | 1 | 1 | 2 |
| 4 | Germany | 0 | 1 | 0 | 1 |
| 5 | South Korea | 0 | 0 | 2 | 2 |
| 6 | Hong Kong | 0 | 0 | 1 | 1 |
| Totals (6 entries) | | 5 | 5 | 5 | 15 |

== Statistics ==
=== Athlete medal leaders ===
| Athlete | Nation | Gender | Olympics^{[a]} | Gold | Silver | Bronze | Total |
|---|---|---|---|---|---|---|---|
| Ma Long | China | Male | 2012–2024 | 6 | 0 | 0 | 6 |
| Wang Nan | China | Female | 2000–2008 | 4 | 1 | 0 | 5 |
| Deng Yaping | China | Female | 1992–1996 | 4 | 0 | 0 | 4 |
| Zhang Yining | China | Female | 2004–2008 | 4 | 0 | 0 | 4 |
| Chen Meng | China | Female | 2020–2024 | 4 | 0 | 0 | 4 |
| Sun Yingsha | China | Female | 2020–2024 | 3 | 2 | 0 | 5 |
| Ding Ning | China | Female | 2012–2016 | 3 | 1 | 0 | 4 |
| Li Xiaoxia | China | Female | 2012–2016 | 3 | 1 | 0 | 4 |
| Zhang Jike | China | Male | 2012–2016 | 3 | 1 | 0 | 4 |
| Fan Zhendong | China | Male | 2020–2024 | 3 | 1 | 0 | 4 |
| Ma Lin | China | Male | 2004–2008 | 3 | 0 | 0 | 3 |
| Wang Hao | China | Male | 2004–2012 | 2 | 3 | 0 | 5 |
| Liu Guoliang | China | Male | 1996–2000 | 2 | 1 | 1 | 4 |
| Qiao Hong | China | Female | 1992–1996 | 2 | 1 | 1 | 4 |
| Kong Linghui | China | Male | 1996–2000 | 2 | 1 | 0 | 3 |
| Xu Xin | China | Male | 2016–2020 | 2 | 1 | 0 | 3 |
| Guo Yue | China | Female | 2004–2012 | 2 | 0 | 2 | 4 |
| Wang Liqin | China | Male | 2000–2008 | 2 | 0 | 2 | 4 |
| Wang Chuqin | China | Male | 2024 | 2 | 0 | 0 | 2 |
| Wang Manyu | China | Female | 2020–2024 | 2 | 0 | 0 | 2 |
| Chen Jing | China; Chinese Taipei | Female | 1988; 1996–2000 | 1 | 2 | 1 | 4 |
| Wang Tao | China | Male | 1992–1996 | 1 | 2 | 0 | 3 |
| Mima Ito | Japan | Female | 2016–2020 | 1 | 1 | 2 | 4 |
| Jun Mizutani | Japan | Male | 2016–2020 | 1 | 1 | 2 | 4 |
| Ryu Seung-min | South Korea | Male | 2004–2012 | 1 | 1 | 1 | 3 |
| Li Ju | China | Female | 2000 | 1 | 1 | 0 | 2 |
| Liu Shiwen | China | Female | 2016–2020 | 1 | 1 | 0 | 2 |
| Lü Lin | China | Male | 1992, 1996 | 1 | 1 | 0 | 2 |
| Jan-Ove Waldner | Sweden | Male | 1992, 2000 | 1 | 1 | 0 | 2 |
| Yoo Nam-kyu | South Korea | Male | 1988–1996 | 1 | 0 | 3 | 4 |
| Hyun Jung-hwa | South Korea | Female | 1988–1992 | 1 | 0 | 2 | 3 |
| Chen Longcan | China | Male | 1988 | 1 | 0 | 0 | 1 |
| Chen Qi | China | Male | 2004 | 1 | 0 | 0 | 1 |
| Wei Qingguang | China | Male | 1988 | 1 | 0 | 0 | 1 |
| Yan Sen | China | Male | 2000 | 1 | 0 | 0 | 1 |
| Yang Young-ja | South Korea | Female | 1988 | 1 | 0 | 0 | 1 |
| Dimitrij Ovtcharov | Germany | Male | 2008–2020 | 0 | 2 | 4 | 6 |
| Timo Boll | Germany | Male | 2008–2020 | 0 | 2 | 2 | 4 |
| Kasumi Ishikawa | Japan | Female | 2012–2020 | 0 | 2 | 1 | 3 |
| Truls Möregårdh | Sweden | Male | 2024 | 0 | 2 | 0 | 2 |
| Miu Hirano | Japan | Female | 2020–2024 | 0 | 2 | 0 | 2 |
| Feng Tianwei | Singapore | Female | 2008–2012 | 0 | 1 | 2 | 3 |
| Jiao Zhimin | China | Female | 1988 | 0 | 1 | 1 | 2 |
| Jean-Philippe Gatien | France | Male | 1992, 2000 | 0 | 1 | 1 | 2 |
| Jörg Roßkopf | Germany | Male | 1992–1996 | 0 | 1 | 1 | 2 |
| Oh Sang-eun | South Korea | Male | 2008–2012 | 0 | 1 | 1 | 2 |
| Li Jiawei | Singapore | Female | 2008–2012 | 0 | 1 | 1 | 2 |
| Wang Yuegu | Singapore | Female | 2008–2012 | 0 | 1 | 1 | 2 |
| Ai Fukuhara | Japan | Female | 2012–2016 | 0 | 1 | 1 | 2 |
| Koki Niwa | Japan | Male | 2016–2020 | 0 | 1 | 1 | 2 |
| Hina Hayata | Japan | Female | 2024 | 0 | 1 | 1 | 2 |
| Kim Ki-taik | South Korea | Male | 1988 | 0 | 1 | 0 | 1 |
| Li Huifen | China | Female | 1988 | 0 | 1 | 0 | 1 |
| Ilija Lupulesku | Yugoslavia | Male | 1988 | 0 | 1 | 0 | 1 |
| Zoran Primorac | Yugoslavia | Male | 1988 | 0 | 1 | 0 | 1 |
| Steffen Fetzner | Germany | Male | 1992 | 0 | 1 | 0 | 1 |
| Chen Zihe | China | Female | 1992 | 0 | 1 | 0 | 1 |
| Gao Jun | China | Female | 1992 | 0 | 1 | 0 | 1 |
| Liu Wei | China | Female | 1996 | 0 | 1 | 0 | 1 |
| Qiao Yunping | China | Female | 1996 | 0 | 1 | 0 | 1 |
| Sun Jin | China | Female | 2000 | 0 | 1 | 0 | 1 |
| Yang Ying | China | Female | 2000 | 0 | 1 | 0 | 1 |
| Kim Hyang-mi | North Korea | Female | 2004 | 0 | 1 | 0 | 1 |
| Ko Lai Chak | Hong Kong | Male | 2004 | 0 | 1 | 0 | 1 |
| Li Ching | Hong Kong | Male | 2004 | 0 | 1 | 0 | 1 |
| Lee Eun-sil | South Korea | Female | 2004 | 0 | 1 | 0 | 1 |
| Seok Eun-mi | South Korea | Female | 2004 | 0 | 1 | 0 | 1 |
| Christian Süß | Germany | Male | 2008 | 0 | 1 | 0 | 1 |
| Joo Se-hyuk | South Korea | Male | 2012 | 0 | 1 | 0 | 1 |
| Sayaka Hirano | Japan | Female | 2012 | 0 | 1 | 0 | 1 |
| Maharu Yoshimura | Japan | Male | 2016 | 0 | 1 | 0 | 1 |
| Han Ying | Germany | Female | 2016 | 0 | 1 | 0 | 1 |
| Petrissa Solja | Germany | Female | 2016 | 0 | 1 | 0 | 1 |
| Shan Xiaona | Germany | Female | 2016 | 0 | 1 | 0 | 1 |
| Patrick Franziska | Germany | Male | 2020 | 0 | 1 | 0 | 1 |
| Anton Källberg | Sweden | Male | 2024 | 0 | 1 | 0 | 1 |
| Kristian Karlsson | Sweden | Male | 2024 | 0 | 1 | 0 | 1 |
| Miwa Harimoto | Japan | Female | 2024 | 0 | 1 | 0 | 1 |
| Ri Jong-sik | North Korea | Male | 2024 | 0 | 1 | 0 | 1 |
| Kim Kum-yong | North Korea | Female | 2024 | 0 | 1 | 0 | 1 |
| Kim Taek-soo | South Korea | Male | 1992 | 0 | 0 | 2 | 2 |
| Lee Chul-seung | South Korea | Male | 1992–1996 | 0 | 0 | 2 | 2 |
| Ryu Ji-hae | South Korea | Female | 1996–2000 | 0 | 0 | 2 | 2 |
| Kim Kyung-ah | South Korea | Female | 2004–2008 | 0 | 0 | 2 | 2 |
| Bastian Steger | Germany | Male | 2012–2016 | 0 | 0 | 2 | 2 |
| Félix Lebrun | France | Male | 2024 | 0 | 0 | 2 | 2 |
| Shin Yu-bin | South Korea | Female | 2024 | 0 | 0 | 2 | 2 |
| Erik Lindh | Sweden | Male | 1988 | 0 | 0 | 1 | 1 |
| Ahn Jae-hyung | South Korea | Male | 1988 | 0 | 0 | 1 | 1 |
| Jasna Fazlić | Yugoslavia | Female | 1988 | 0 | 0 | 1 | 1 |
| Gordana Perkučin | Yugoslavia | Female | 1988 | 0 | 0 | 1 | 1 |
| Ma Wenge | China | Male | 1992 | 0 | 0 | 1 | 1 |
| Ri Pun-hui | North Korea | Female | 1992 | 0 | 0 | 1 | 1 |
| Kang Hee-chan | South Korea | Male | 1992 | 0 | 0 | 1 | 1 |
| Li Bun-Hui | North Korea | Female | 1992 | 0 | 0 | 1 | 1 |
| Yu Sun-bok | North Korea | Female | 1992 | 0 | 0 | 1 | 1 |
| Hong Cha-ok | South Korea | Female | 1992 | 0 | 0 | 1 | 1 |
| Park Hae-jung | South Korea | Female | 1996 | 0 | 0 | 1 | 1 |
| Patrick Chila | France | Male | 2000 | 0 | 0 | 1 | 1 |
| Kim Moo-kyo | South Korea | Female | 2000 | 0 | 0 | 1 | 1 |
| Michael Maze | Denmark | Male | 2004 | 0 | 0 | 1 | 1 |
| Finn Tugwell | Denmark | Male | 2004 | 0 | 0 | 1 | 1 |
| Niu Jianfeng | China | Female | 2004 | 0 | 0 | 1 | 1 |
| Yoon Jae-young | South Korea | Male | 2008 | 0 | 0 | 1 | 1 |
| Dang Ye-seo | South Korea | Female | 2008 | 0 | 0 | 1 | 1 |
| Park Mi-young | South Korea | Female | 2008 | 0 | 0 | 1 | 1 |
| Kim Song-i | North Korea | Female | 2016 | 0 | 0 | 1 | 1 |
| Tomokazu Harimoto | Japan | Male | 2020 | 0 | 0 | 1 | 1 |
| Doo Hoi Kem | Hong Kong | Female | 2020 | 0 | 0 | 1 | 1 |
| Lee Ho Ching | Hong Kong | Female | 2020 | 0 | 0 | 1 | 1 |
| Minnie Soo | Hong Kong | Female | 2020 | 0 | 0 | 1 | 1 |
| Lin Yun-ju | Chinese Taipei | Male | 2020 | 0 | 0 | 1 | 1 |
| Cheng I-ching | Chinese Taipei | Female | 2020 | 0 | 0 | 1 | 1 |
| Alexis Lebrun | France | Male | 2024 | 0 | 0 | 1 | 1 |
| Simon Gauzy | France | Male | 2024 | 0 | 0 | 1 | 1 |
| Jeon Ji-hee | South Korea | Female | 2024 | 0 | 0 | 1 | 1 |
| Lee Eun-hye | South Korea | Female | 2024 | 0 | 0 | 1 | 1 |
| Lim Jong-hoon | South Korea | Male | 2024 | 0 | 0 | 1 | 1 |

^{a} The years indicate the Olympics at which the medals were won.

=== Medals per year ===
| Nation | 1896–1984 | 88 | 92 | 96 | 00 | 04 | 08 | 12 | 16 | 20 | 24 | Total |
|---|---|---|---|---|---|---|---|---|---|---|---|---|
| China | | 5 | 6 | 8 | 8 | 6 | 8 | 6 | 6 | 7 | 6 | 66 |
| Chinese Taipei | | – | – | 1 | 1 | – | – | – | – | 1 | – | 3 |
| Denmark | | – | – | – | – | 1 | – | – | – | – | – | 1 |
| France | | – | 1 | – | 1 | – | – | – | – | – | 2 | 4 |
| Germany | | – | 1 | 1 | – | – | 1 | 2 | 2 | 2 | – | 9 |
| Hong Kong | | – | – | – | – | 1 | – | – | – | 1 | – | 2 |
| Japan | | – | – | – | – | – | – | 1 | 3 | 4 | 2 | 10 |
| North Korea | | – | 2 | – | – | 1 | – | – | 1 | – | 1 | 5 |
| Singapore | | – | – | – | – | – | 1 | 2 | – | – | – | 3 |
| South Korea | | 4 | 5 | 2 | 1 | 3 | 2 | 1 | – | – | 2 | 20 |
| Sweden | | 1 | 1 | – | 1 | – | – | – | – | – | 2 | 5 |
| Yugoslavia | | 2 | – | – | – | – | – | – | – | – | – | 2 |

=== Podium sweeps ===
There have been three podium sweeps in Olympic table tennis history. This is when athletes from one NOC win all three medals in a single event. This has not been possible since the conclusion of the 2008 Olympic games, since following China's podium sweeps, the ITTF has limited each country at the Olympics to a maximum of two contestants per gender.

| Games | Event | NOC | Gold | Silver | Bronze |
| 2008 Beijing | Men's singles | China | Ma Lin | Wang Hao | Wang Liqin |
| 1988 Seoul | Women's singles | China | Chen Jing | Li Huifen | Jiao Zhimin |
| 2008 Beijing | Women's singles | China | Zhang Yining | Wang Nan | Guo Yue |

== See also ==
- World Table Tennis Championships
- Table Tennis World Cup
