= 1993 World Table Tennis Championships – Mixed doubles =

1993 Mixed doubles

The 1993 World Table Tennis Championships mixed doubles was the 42nd edition of the mixed doubles championship.

Wang Tao and Liu Wei defeated Yoo Nam-kyu and Hyun Jung-hwa in the final by three sets to nil.

== Results ==
Round of 16
(China) Wang Tao (China) Liu Wei	20	25	21
(South Korea) Kang Hee-chan (South Korea) Hong Cha-ok	22	23	17
(China) Zhang Lei (China) Gao Jun	21	21
(Japan) Hirozaku Murakami (Japan) Kiyomi Ishida	20	16
(China) Ma Wenge (China) Qiao Yunping	23	21
(Hungary) Zsolt Harcsi (Hungary) Krisztina Tóth	21	9
(China) Wang Hao (China) Zheng Yuan	11	21	21
(North Korea) Kim Song-hui (North Korea) Li Bun-hui	21	16	18
(North Korea) Li Sung-il (North Korea) Yu Sun-bok	16	21	21
(Romania) Ignat Cristian (Romania) Adriana Nastase	21	16	12
(China) Lin Zhigang (China) Deng Yaping	21	21
(Canada) Ilija Lupulesku (Romania) Emilia Elena Ciosu	14	17
(South Korea) Yoo Nam-kyu (South Korea) Hyun Jung-hwa	18	22	21
(China) Lü Lin (China) Wu Na	21	20	16
(Canada) Johnny Huang (Canada) Geng Lijuan	19	21	21
(China) Xie Chaojie (China) Chen Zihe	21	19	7

Quarterfinals
(China) Wang Tao (China) Liu Wei	21	21	21
(China) Zhang Lei (China) Gao Jun	11	17	16
(China) Ma Wenge (China) Qiao Yunping	8	21	18	21	21
(China) Wang Hao (China) Zheng Yuan	21	19	21	8	19
(North Korea) Li Sung-il (North Korea) Yu Sun-bok	10	23	17	21	21
(China) Lin Zhigang (China) Deng Yaping	21	21	21	19	18
(South Korea) Yoo Nam-kyu (South Korea) Hyun Jung-hwa	21	18	22	21
(Canada) Huang (Canada) Geng Lijuan	18	21	20	13

Semifinals
(China) Wang Tao (China) Liu Wei	21	21	21
(China) Ma Wenge (China) Qiao Yunping	18	11	12
(North Korea) Li Sung-il (North Korea) Yu Sun-bok	14	14	14
(South Korea) Yoo Nam-kyu (South Korea) Hyun Jung-hwa	21	21	21

Final
(China) Wang Tao (China) Liu Wei	22	13	21	21
(South Korea) Yoo Nam-kyu (South Korea) Hyun Jung-hwa	20	21	9	13

== See also ==
List of World Table Tennis Championships medalists
