= 1991 World Table Tennis Championships – Mixed doubles =

1991 Mixed doubles

The 1991 World Table Tennis Championships mixed doubles was the 41st edition of the mixed doubles championship.

Wang Tao and Liu Wei defeated Xie Chaojie and Chen Zihe in the final by three sets to nil.

== Results ==
Round of 16
Yoo Nam-kyu; Hyun Jung-hwa	22	16
(China) Xie Chaojie (China) Chen Zihe	24	21
(Germany) Jörg Roßkopf (Germany) Nicole Struse	21	21
(China) Zhang Lei (China) Qiao Yunping	19	18
(Greece) Kalinikos Kreanga (Romania) Otilia Bădescu	17	21	21
(Hong Kong) Lo Chuen Tsung (Hong Kong) Chai Po Wa	21	13	16
Chu Kyo Sung; Kim Hye Yong	21	21
(China) Chen Zhibin (China) Gao Jun	16	16
(France) Jean-Philippe Gatien (France) Xiaoming Wang-Dréchou	21	21
Li Sung-il; Hong Cha-ok	16	14
(China) Wang Tao (China) Liu Wei	21	21
Choi Gyong Sop; Park Kyung Ae	12	13
Kim Song-hui; Li Bun-hui	21	21
Kang Hee Chan; An Hui-Suk	17	12
(China) Wei Qingguang (China) Deng Yaping	17	21	21
(France) Damien Éloi (France) Sandrine Derrien	21	11	13

Quarterfinals
(China) Xie Chaojie (China) Chen Zihe	21	21	24
(Germany) Roßkopf (Germany) Struse	14	15	22
(Greece) Kreanga (Romania) Bădescu	21	21	21
Chu Kyo Sung; Kim Hye Yong	8	12	13
(France) Gatien (France) Wang-Dréchou	11	13	21	12
(China) Wang Tao (China) Liu Wei	21	21	19	21
Kim Song-hui; Li Bun-hui	21	21	21
(China) Wei Qingguang (China) Deng Yaping	18	15	11

Semifinals
(China) Xie Chaojie (China) Chen Zihe	21	21	21
(Greece) Kreanga (Romania) Bădescu	15	19	14
(China) Wang Tao (China) Liu Wei	21	10	21	23
Kim Song-hui; Li Bun-hui	18	21	17	21

Final
(China) Xie Chaojie (China) Chen Zihe	14	19	14
(China) Wang Tao (China) Liu Wei	21	21	21

== See also ==
List of World Table Tennis Championships medalists
