= 1993 World Table Tennis Championships – Women's doubles =

1993 Women's doubles

Medalists
gold medal	Liu Wei; Qiao Yunping	China
silver medal	Deng Yaping; Qiao Hong	China
bronze medal	Gao Jun; Chen Zihe	China
bronze medal	Chai Po Wa; Chan Tan Lui	Hong Kong

The 1993 World Table Tennis Championships women's doubles was the 41st edition of the women's doubles championship. Liu Wei and Qiao Yunping defeated Deng Yaping and Qiao Hong in the final by three sets to one.

== Results ==
Round of 16
(China) Deng Yaping (China) Qiao Hong	21	22
(Romania) Otilia Bădescu (Romania) Emilia Elena Ciosu	6	20
(Hungary) Krisztina Tóth (Hungary) Vivien Ello	18	22	21
(Luxembourg) Ni Xialian (Luxembourg) Michele Paler	21	20	15
(Hong Kong) Chai Po Wa (Hong Kong) Chan Tan Lui	21	19	21
(China) Zhang Qin (China) Wu Na	16	21	16
(North Korea) Wi Bok-Sun (North Korea) An Hui-Suk	21	9	21
(South Korea) Hyun Jung-hwa (South Korea) Park Hae-jung	18	21	19
(North Korea) Li Bun Hui (North Korea) Yu Sun-bok	21	21
(Lithuania) Ruta Garkauskaite (Lithuania) Jolanta Prūsienė	12	14
(China) Liu Wei (China) Qiao Yunping	21	21
(South Korea) Hong Cha-ok (South Korea) Hong Soon-hwa	16	7
(Chinese Taipei) Chen Jing (Chinese Taipei) Xu Jing	21	21
(Russia) Galina Melnik (Italy) Alessia Arisi	6	13
(Hungary) Eva Braun (Russia) Tatiana Medvedeva	6	21	15
(China) Gao Jun (China) Chen Zihe	21	15	21

Quarterfinals
(China) Deng Yaping (China) Qiao Hong	21	21	21
(Hungary) Tóth (Hungary) Ello	15	15	3
(Hong Kong) Chai Po Wa (Hong Kong) Chan Tan Lui	21	21	21
(North Korea) Wi Bok-Sun (North Korea) An Hui-Suk	19	15	15
(North Korea) Li Bun Hui (North Korea) Yu Sun-bok	22	22	21	21	14
(China) Liu Wei (China) Qiao Yunping	24	20	23	18	21
(Chinese Taipei) Chen Jing (Chinese Taipei) Xu Jing	19	21	20	14
(China) Gao Jun (China) Chen Zihe	21	17	22	21

Semifinals
(China) Deng Yaping (China) Qiao Hong	21	21	21
(Hong Kong) Chai Po Wa (Hong Kong) Chan Tan Lui	12	8	14
(China) Liu Wei (China) Qiao Yunping	21	21	21
(China) Gao Jun (China) Chen Zihe	9	16	11

Final
(China) Deng Yaping (China) Qiao Hong	19	21	17	21
(China) Liu Wei (China) Qiao Yunping	21	14	21	23

== See also ==
List of World Table Tennis Championships medalists
