= 1993 World Table Tennis Championships – Men's team =

1993 Swaythling Cup (men's team)

The 1993 World Table Tennis Championships – Swaythling Cup (men's team) was the 42nd edition of the men's team championship.

Sweden won the gold medal defeating China 3–1 in the final. Germany won the bronze medal defeating the North Korea 3–0 in the bronze medal play off.

== Medalists ==
Event	Gold	Silver	Bronze
	Sweden; Mikael Appelgren; Peter Karlsson; Erik Lindh; Jörgen Persson; Jan-Ove Waldner	China; Liu Guoliang; Lü Lin; Ma Wenge; Wang Hao; Wang Tao; Zhang Lei	Germany; Oliver Alke; Steffen Fetzner; Peter Franz; Richard Prause; Jörg Roßkopf

== Final Stage knockout phase ==
=== Quarter finals ===
Team One	Team Two	Score
Sweden	Belgium	3–0
China	Japan	3–0
Germany	South Korea	3–2
North Korea	France	3–2

=== Semifinals ===
Team One	Team Two	Score
Sweden	North Korea	3–1
China	Germany	3–1

=== Third-place playoff ===
Team One	Team Two	Score
Germany	North Korea	3–0

=== Final ===
Sweden 3		China 1	Score
Karlsson	bt	Wang Hao	13–21 21–19 21–16
Waldner	lost to	Ma Wenge	14–21 21–14 20–22
Persson	bt	Wang Tao	26–24 16–21 21–16
Waldner	bt	Wang Hao	21–16 17–21 21–13

== See also ==
List of World Table Tennis Championships medalists
