= 1995 World Table Tennis Championships – Men's doubles =

1995 Men's doubles

The 1995 World Table Tennis Championships men's doubles was the 43rd edition of the men's doubles championship. Wang Tao and Lü Lin won the title after defeating Zoran Primorac and Vladimir Samsonov in the final by three sets to one.

== Results ==
Round of 16
(China) Wang Tao (China) Lü Lin	16	22	22
(Netherlands) Danny Heister (Netherlands) Trinko Keen	21	20	20
(Sweden) Peter Karlsson (Sweden) Mikael Appelgren	21	21
(Slovenia) Robert Smrekar (Slovenia) Gregor Komac	11	19
(Greece) Kalinikos Kreanga (Federal Republic of Yugoslavia) Zoran Kalinić	17	10
(Belgium) Jean-Michel Saive (Belgium) Philippe Saive	21	21
(Russia) Dmitry Mazunov (Russia) Andrei Mazunov	21	9	16
(China) Liu Guoliang (China) Lin Zhigang	17	21	21
(France) Jean-Philippe Gatien (France) Damien Éloi	21	16	21
(Indonesia) Muhammad Al Arkam (Indonesia) Deddy Da Costa	17	21	14
(Sweden) Jan-Ove Waldner (Sweden) Jörgen Persson	21	21
(Greece) Ioannis Vlotinos (Greece) Thefoanis Avradinis	15	18
(Croatia) Zoran Primorac (Belarus) Vladimir Samsonov	21	21
(Germany) Jörg Roßkopf (Germany) Steffen Fetzner	17	12
(China) Ma Wenge (China) Zhang Lei	21	21
(Japan) Hiroshi Shibutani (Japan) Kōji Matsushita	18	14

Quarterfinals
(China) Wang Tao (China) Lü Lin	21	21	21
(Sweden) Karlsson (Sweden) Appelgren	13	18	10
(Belgium) Saive (Belgium) Saive	11	10	10
(China) Liu Guoliang (China) Lin Zhigang	21	21	21
(France) Gatien (France) Éloi	25	15	21	21
(Sweden) Waldner (Sweden) Persson	23	21	18	16
(Croatia) Primorac (Belarus) Samsonov	24	21	19	21
(Japan) Shibutani (Japan) Matsushita	22	13	21	17

Semifinals
(China) Wang Tao (China) Lü Lin	10	21	14	21	21
(China) Liu Guoliang (China) Lin Zhigang	21	14	21	14	13
(France) Gatien (France) Éloi	21	15	15	17
(Croatia) Primorac (Belarus) Samsonov	17	21	21	21

Final
(China) Wang Tao (China) Lü Lin	18	21	21	21
(Croatia) Primorac (Belarus) Samsonov	21	15	14	17

== See also ==
- List of World Table Tennis Championships medalists
