= 1990 Asian Table Tennis Championships =

- Date: 9–17 December 1990
- Edition: 10th
- Location: Kuala Lumpur, Malaysia

Champions

Men's singles
- (China) Wang Tao

Women's singles
- (China) Qiao Hong

Men's doubles
- (North Korea) Kim Guk-chol / (North Korea) Kim Song-hui

Women's doubles
- (China) Hu Xiaoxin / (China) Qiao Hong

Mixed doubles
- (South Korea) Yoo Nam-kyu / (South Korea) Hyun Jung-hwa

Men's team
- China

Women's team
- South Korea
← 1988 ·	Asian Table Tennis Championships	· 1992 →

The 10th Asian Table Tennis Championships 1990 were held in Kuala Lumpur, Malaysia from 9 to 17 December 1990. It was organised by the Table Tennis Association of Malaysia under the authority of Asian Table Tennis Union (ATTU) and International Table Tennis Federation (ITTF).

== Medal summary ==
=== Medal table ===
Rank	Nation	Gold	Silver	Bronze	Total
1	China	4	3	4	11
2	South Korea	2	1	5	8
3	North Korea	1	2	2	5
4	Chinese Taipei	0	1	0	1
5	Japan	0	0	1	1
Totals (5 entries)		7	7	12	26

=== Events ===
Event	Gold	Silver	Bronze
Men's singles	(China) Wang Tao	(China) Ma Wenge	(China) Xie Chaojie
Men's singles	(China) Wang Tao	(China) Ma Wenge	(South Korea) Kim Taek-soo
Women's singles	(China) Qiao Hong	(China) Liu Wei	(North Korea) Ri Pun-hui
Women's singles	(China) Qiao Hong	(China) Liu Wei	(South Korea) Hong Soon-hwa
Men's doubles	(North Korea) Kim Guk-chol (North Korea) Kim Song-hui	(Chinese Taipei) Feng Sheng-chin (Chinese Taipei) Wu Wen-chia	(China) Lü Lin (China) Wang Tao
Men's doubles	(North Korea) Kim Guk-chol (North Korea) Kim Song-hui	(Chinese Taipei) Feng Sheng-chin (Chinese Taipei) Wu Wen-chia	(Japan) Yoji Morimoto (Japan) Hiroshi Shibutani
Women's doubles	(China) Hu Xiaoxin (China) Qiao Hong	(China) Jing Junhong (China) Liu Wei	(South Korea) Hong Cha-ok (South Korea) Hyun Jung-hwa
Women's doubles	(China) Hu Xiaoxin (China) Qiao Hong	(China) Jing Junhong (China) Liu Wei	(South Korea) Hong Soon-hwa (South Korea) Lee Tae-joo
Mixed doubles	(South Korea) Yoo Nam-kyu (South Korea) Hyun Jung-hwa	(South Korea) Kim Taek-soo (South Korea) Hong Cha-ok	(China) Ma Wenge (China) Hu Xiaoxin
Mixed doubles	(South Korea) Yoo Nam-kyu (South Korea) Hyun Jung-hwa	(South Korea) Kim Taek-soo (South Korea) Hong Cha-ok	(North Korea) Kim Guk-chol (North Korea) Yu Sun-bok
Men's team	China	North Korea	South Korea
Women's team	South Korea	North Korea	China

== See also ==
- World Table Tennis Championships
- Asian Cup
