= 1991 World Table Tennis Championships – Men's doubles =

1991 Men's doubles

The 1991 World Table Tennis Championships men's doubles was the 41st edition of the men's doubles championship. Thomas von Scheele and Peter Karlsson won the title after defeating Wang Tao and Lü Lin in the final by three sets to two. The matches were best of five sets from the quarter-final stage.

== Results ==
Round of 16
(Germany) Jörg Roßkopf (Germany) Steffen Fetzner	21	25
(China) Zhang Lei (China) Yu Shentong	12	23
(Soviet Union) Andrei Mazunov (Soviet Union) Dmitry Mazunov
Kim Myong-jun; Lee Chul-seung
(Poland) Andrzej Grubba (Poland) Leszek Kucharski	21	21	21
(Japan) Kiyoshi Saito (Japan) Yuji Matsushita	19	23	18
(China) Wang Tao (China) Lü Lin	19	21	21
(Sweden) Jan-Ove Waldner (Sweden) Mikael Appelgren	21	16	17
Yoo Nam-kyu; Kim Song-hui	21	21
(Japan) Hiroshi Shibutani (Japan) Kōji Matsushita	19	17
(China) Wei Qingguang (China) Xie Chaojie	18	21	21
(Sweden) Jörgen Persson (Sweden) Erik Lindh	21	17	15
(Norway) Wang Yansheng (Norway) Frode Grini	21	21
(Hungary) Károly Németh (Hungary) Sándor Varga	18	12
(Socialist Federal Republic of Yugoslavia) Zoran Primorac (Socialist Federal Republic of Yugoslavia) Ilija Lupulesku	19	21	19
(Sweden) Peter Karlsson (Sweden) Thomas von Scheele	21	12	21

Quarterfinals
(Germany) Roßkopf (Germany) Fetzner	17	21	14	19
(Soviet Union) Mazunov A (Soviet Union) Mazunov D	21	18	21	21
(Poland) Grubba (Poland) Kucharski	21	23	11	18	19
(China) Wang Tao (China) Lü Lin	15	21	21	21	21
Yoo Nam-kyu; Kim Song-hui	21	10	21	18	17
(Sweden) Persson (Sweden) Lindh	16	21	18	21	21
(Norway) Wang Yangsheng (Norway) Grini	15	14	10
(Sweden) Karlsson (Sweden) von Scheele	21	21	21

Semifinals
(Soviet Union) Mazunov A (Soviet Union) Mazunov D	17	16	10
(China) Wang Tao (China) Lü Lin	21	21	21
(Sweden) Persson (Sweden) Lindh	21	19	19	12
(Sweden) Karlsson (Sweden) von Scheele	13	21	21	21

Final
(China) Wang Tao (China) Lü Lin	21	16	14	21	18
(Sweden) Karlsson (Sweden) von Scheele	16	21	21	18	21

== See also ==
List of World Table Tennis Championships medalists
