= List of table tennis players =

This list of table tennis players is alphabetically ordered by surname. The main source of the information included in this page is the official International Table Tennis Federation (ITTF) database. More detailed information about their careers is available in the individual players' articles, and in the ITTF database.

== Inclusion criteria ==
Only table tennis players included in the ITTF database who achieved at least one medal in one of the considered competitions can be listed here. A picture of players who achieved an Olympic gold medal in a single event is shown.

== Other included information ==
The name of each player is preceded by the flag of all the countries for which the player has competed. Each player is listed with their achievements in the single event of the considered competitions. Members of the ITTF Hall of Fame are listed in bold.

== Considered competitions and achievements ==
The considered competitions and the related achievements to be listed in this page are:

- Olympic Games: gold, silver, and bronze medals in single events
- World Table Tennis Championships: gold medal in single events
- Table Tennis World Cup: gold medal in single events
- Table Tennis European Championships: gold medal in single events
- Asian Table Tennis Championships: gold medal in single events

== A ==
- (United States) Krasimir Rainov: winner of World Championships in 1936, 1937
- (Soviet Union) (Italy) Fliura Abbate-Bulatova: winner of European Championships in 1988
- (South Korea) Ahn Jae-Hyung
- (Romania) Maria Alexandru-Golopenta: winner of European Championships in 1966
- (Sweden) Hans Alsér: winner of European Championships in 1962, 1970
- (Czechoslovakia) **Ivan Andreadis**
- (England) Skylet Andrew
- (Portugal) Tiago Apolónia
- (Sweden) Mikael Appelgren: winner of World Cup in 1983; winner of European Championships in 1982, 1988, 1990
- (Nigeria) Atanda Musa

== B ==
- (Romania) Otilia Badescu: winner of European Championships in 2003
- (Hong Kong) Bao Guio Wong Bik Yiu: winner of Asian Championships in 1954
- (Hungary) (England) Viktor Barna: winner of World Championships in 1930, 1932, 1933, 1934, 1935
- (England) **Chester Barnes**
- (Hungary) Csilla Batorfi: winner of European Championships in 1986
- (Germany) Patrick Baum
- (Hungary) (United States) **Laszlo Bellak**
- (Sweden) Stellan Bengtsson: winner of World Championships in 1971; winner of European Championships in 1972
- (Sweden) Ulf Bengtsson: winner of European Championships in 1984
- (Hungary) Zoltan Berczik: winner of European Championships in 1958, 1960
- (Austria) (England) Richard Bergmann: winner of World Championships in 1937, 1939, 1947, 1950
- (United States) Buddy Blattner
- (Germany) Timo Boll: winner of World Cup in 2002, 2005; winner of European Championships in 2002, 2007, 2008, 2010, 2011, 2012, 2018
- (Socialist Federal Republic of Yugoslavia) (Croatia) Tamara Boroš

== C ==
- (China) Cai Zhenhua: winner of Asian Championships in 1982
- (Brazil) Hugo Calderano: winner of World Cup in 2025; bronze medalist at the 2014 Youth Olympic Games; two-time Pan American Games champion
- (China) Cao Yanhua: winner of World Championships in 1983, 1985; winner of Asian Championships in 1978, 1982
- (China) Cao Zhen
- (Sweden) Ulf Carlsson
- (China) (Chinese Taipei) Chen Jing: Olympic gold medal at Seoul 1988; Olympic silver medal at Atlanta 1996; Olympic bronze medal at Sydney 2000
- (China) Chen Longcan: winner of World Cup in 1986; winner of Asian Championships in 1988
- (Chinese Taipei) Chen Pao-Poe: winner of Asian Championships in 1953
- (China) **Chen Qi**
- (China) (Austria) Chen Weixing
- (China) (England) Chen Xinhua: winner of World Cup in 1985
- (China) Chen Zihe
- (Chinese Taipei) Chiang Peng-Lung: winner of Asian Championships in 2000
- (France) Patrick Chila
- (South Korea) Choi Kyong Ja: winner of Asian Championships in 1957
- (Chinese Taipei) Chuang Chih-Yuan

== D ==
- (South Korea) Dang Ye-Seo
- (China) Deng Yaping: Olympic gold medal at Barcelona 1992; Olympic gold medal at Atlanta 1996; winner of World Championships in 1991, 1995, 1997; winner of World Cup in 1996; winner of Asian Championships in 1994
- (Czechoslovakia) Vlasta Depetrisova: winner of World Championships in 1939
- (China) Ding Ning: Olympic gold medal at Rio 2016; Olympic silver medal at London 2012; winner of World Championships in 2011, 2015 and 2017; winner of World Cup in 2011, 2014 and 2018; winner of Asian Championships in 2009
- (China) Ding Song
- (Romania) Daniela Dodean
- (Socialist Federal Republic of Yugoslavia) Žarko Dolinar
- (England) Desmond Douglas

== E ==
- (Japan) Tomie Edano: winner of Asian Championships in 1974
- (Japan) Fujie Eguchi: winner of World Championships in 1957
- (Poland) (France) Alojzy Ehrlich
- (Scotland) Helen Elliot
- (Serbia) Silvija Erdelji

== F ==
- (Soviet Union) (Russia) Oxana Fadeeva
- (China) Fan Ying
- (China) Fan Zhendong
- (China) Fang Bo
- (Hungary) Gizella Farkas: winner of World Championships in 1947, 1948, 1949
- (Socialist Federal Republic of Yugoslavia) Jasna Fazlic
- (Singapore) Feng Tianwei: Olympic bronze medal at London 2012
- (Germany) Steffen Fetzner
- (Portugal) Marcos Freitas
- (Japan) Naoko Fukazu: winner of World Championships in 1965
- (Japan) Ai Fukuhara

== G ==
- (Croatia) Andrej Gacina
- (Soviet Union) (Russia) Svetlana Ganina
- (China) (United States) Gao Jun
- (France) Jean-Philippe Gatien: Olympic silver medal at Barcelona 1992; winner of World Championships in 1993; winner of World Cup in 1994
- (China) Ge Xinai: winner of World Championships in 1979
- (Hungary) Gabor Gergely: winner of European Championships in 1978
- (Greece) Panagiotis Gionis
- (Philippines) Richard Gonzales
- (Hungary) Sandor Glancz
- (Germany) Qianhong Gotsch-He: winner of European Championships in 2000
- (Poland) Andrzej Grubba: winner of World Cup in 1988
- (Serbia and Montenegro) (Serbia) Slobodan Grujić
- (Bulgaria) Daniela Guergueltcheva: winner of European Championships in 1990
- (China) Guo Yan: winner of World Cup in 2006, 2010; winner of Asian Championships in 2012
- (China) Guo Yue: Olympic bronze medal at Beijing 2008; winner of World Championships in 2007
- (China) Guo Yuehua: winner of World Championships in 1981, 1983; winner of World Cup in 1980, 1982; winner of Asian Championships in 1978

== H ==
- (Japan) Nobuhiko Hasegawa: winner of World Championships in 1967; winner of Asian Championships in 1967, 1970, 1972, 1974
- (China) Hao Shuai
- (Socialist Federal Republic of Yugoslavia) Vilim Harangozo
- (China) (Japan) He Zhili: winner of World Championships in 1987; winner of Asian Championships in 1984, 1986, 1988, 1996
- (England) John Hilton: winner of European Championships in 1980
- (Japan) Miu Hirano: winner of the Women's World Cup in 2016, the first non-Chinese player to win the title
- (Japan) Sayaka Hirano
- (South Korea) Hong Cha-Ok
- (Netherlands) Mirjam Hooman-Kloppenburg
- (Brazil) Hugo Hoyama
- (Turkey) Hu Melek
- (China) Hu Yulan: winner of World Championships in 1973
- (Canada) Wenguan Johnny Huang
- (South Korea) Hyun Jung-Hwa: Olympic bronze medal at Barcelona 1992; winner of World Championships in 1993
- (India) Nav Hora
- (Japan) Kasumi Ishikawa
- (Japan) Kazuko Ito-Yamaizumi: winner of Asian Championships in 1960
- (Japan) Shigeo Itoh: winner of World Championships in 1969

== J ==
- (Hungary) Roland Jacobi: winner of World Championships in 1926
- (China) (Hong Kong) Jiang Huajun
- (China) Jiang Jialiang: winner of World Championships in 1985, 1987; winner of World Cup in 1984; winner of Asian Championships in 1986
- (China) Jiao Zhimin: Olympic bronze medal at Seoul 1988
- (Singapore) Jing Jun Hong
- (Sweden) Kjell Johansson: winner of European Championships in 1964, 1966
- (Hungary) István Jónyer: winner of World Championships in 1975
- (South Korea) Joo Se-Hyuk
- (South Korea) Jung Young-Sik
- (United States) Jishan Liang: 2nd in the USA National Team, Pro Coach, and Top 150 in WTT (2023)

== K ==
- (Socialist Federal Republic of Yugoslavia) Zoran Kalinić
- (India) Sharath Kamal: won gold medal at Commonwealth Games in 2006
- (South Korea) Kang Hee-Chan
- (Brazil) Cláudio Kano
- (Socialist Federal Republic of Yugoslavia) (Serbia and Montenegro) (Serbia) Aleksandar Karakašević
- (Sweden) Peter Karlsson: winner of European Championships in 2000
- (Japan) **Kazuko Ito-Yamaizumi**
- (Netherlands) Gerdie Keen
- (Hungary) **Istvan Kelen**
- (Czechoslovakia) Marie Kettnerová: winner of World Championships in 1933, 1935
- (North Korea) Kim Hyang-Mi: Olympic silver medal at Athens 2004
- (South Korea) Kim Ki-Taik: Olympic silver medal at Seoul 1988
- (South Korea) Kim Kyung-Ah: Olympic bronze medal at Athens 2004
- (South Korea) Kim Min-Seok
- (South Korea) Kim Moo-Kyo
- (North Korea) Kim Song-i: Olympic bronze medal at Rio 2016
- (South Korea) Kim Taek-Soo: Olympic bronze medal at Barcelona 1992
- (South Korea) Kim Wan
- (Japan) Koji Kimura: winner of Asian Championships in 1964
- (Japan) Seiya Kishikawa
- (Hungary) Tibor Klampár: winner of World Cup in 1981
- (Hong Kong) Ko Lai Chak
- (Hungary) Eva Koczian: winner of European Championships in 1958, 1960, 1964
- (Japan) Mitsuru Kohno: winner of World Championships in 1977; winner of Asian Championships in 1968
- (Czechoslovakia) Stanislav Kolar: winner of World Championships in 1936
- (China) Kong Linghui: Olympic gold medal at Sydney 2000; winner of World Championships in 1995; winner of World Cup in 1995; winner of Asian Championships in 1994, 1996
- (Japan) Toshiko Kowada: winner of World Championships in 1969, winner of Asian Championships in 1970
- (Greece) Kalinikos Kreanga

== L ==
- Ian Lariba: Philippines' First-Ever Table Tennis Olympian (Rio 2016)
- (Hong Kong) Lau Sek Fong: winner of Asian Championships in 1957
- (England) Johnny Leach: winner of World Championships in 1949, 1951
- (South Korea) Lee Chul-Seung
- (South Korea) Lee Eun-Sil
- (North Korea) Li Bun-Hui: Olympic bronze medal at Barcelona 1992
- (Hong Kong) Li Ching
- (Sweden) Li Fen: winner of European Championships in 2013
- (China) **Li Furong**
- (China) Li Huifen: Olympic silver medal at Seoul 1988
- (Netherlands) Li Jiao: winner of European Championships in 2007, 2011
- (Singapore) Li Jiawei
- (Netherlands) Li Jie
- (China) Li Ju: Olympic silver medal at Sydney 2000; winner of World Cup in 2000; winner of Asian Championships in 1998
- (China) Li Li: winner of Asian Championships in 1972
- (China) Li Nan
- (China) Li Ping
- (Poland) Li Qian
- (China) Li Xiaoxia: Olympic gold medal at London 2012; winner of World Championships in 2013; winner of World Cup in 2008
- (China) Liang Geliang: winner of Asian Championships in 1976
- (China) Lin Huiqing: winner of World Championships in 1971
- (China) (Hong Kong) Lin Ling: winner of Asian Championships in 2000, 2005
- (Sweden) Erik Lindh: Olympic bronze medal at Seoul 1988
- (China) Liu Guoliang: Olympic gold medal at Atlanta 1996; Olympic bronze medal at Sydney 2000; winner of World Championships in 1999; winner of World Cup in 1996
- (Austria) Liu Jia: winner of European Championships in 2005
- (China) Liu Shiwen: winner of World Cup in 2009, 2012; winner of Asian Championships in 2013
- (China) **Liu Wei**
- (China) Lü Lin
- (Socialist Federal Republic of Yugoslavia) (United States) Ilija Lupulesku

== M ==
- (China) Ma Lin: Olympic gold medal at Beijing 2008; winner of World Cup in 2000, 2003, 2004, 2006
- (China) Ma Long: Olympic gold medal at Rio 2016 & Tokyo 2020; winner of Asian Championships in 2009, 2012, 2013; winner of World Cup in 2012, 2015; winner of World Championships in 2015, 2017, 2019
- (China) Ma Wenge: Olympic bronze medal at Barcelona 1992; winner of World Cup in 1989, 1992
- (Hungary) Judit Magos-Havas: winner of European Championships in 1974, 1978
- (South Vietnam) Mai Văn Hòa: winner of Asian Championships in 1953, 1954
- (Japan) Kimiyo Matsuzaki: winner of World Championships in 1959, 1963; winner of Asian Championships in 1963
- (France) Adrien Mattenet
- (Denmark) Michael Maze: winner of European Championships in 2009
- (United States) **James McClure**
- (Hungary) Zoltan Mechlovits: winner of World Championships in 1928
- (Hungary) Maria Mednyanszky: winner of World Championships in 1926, 1928, 1929, 1930, 1931
- (Germany) Erika Metzger
- (India) Manika Batra
- (Japan) Jun Mizutani
- (Romania) (Croatia) Cornelia Molnar
- (Denmark) Martin Monrad
- (Portugal) João Monteiro
- (Japan) Sachiko Morisawa: winner of World Championships in 1967
- (Hungary) Livia Mossoczy
- (Australia) Phoebe Marcheff

== N ==
- (India) Gool Nasikwala: winner of Asian Championships in 1952
- (China) (Luxembourg) Ni Xialian: winner of European Championships in 1998, 2002
- (China) Niu Jianfeng: winner of Asian Championships in 2003
- (Japan) Koki Niwa: two times world junior champion (2010 doubles, 2011 singles); several silver medals in doubles and in teams sections of the most important competitions

== O ==
- (Japan) Ichiro Ogimura: winner of World Championships in 1954, 1956; winner of Asian Championships in 1960
- (South Korea) Oh Sang-Eun
- (Japan) Yukie Ohzeki: winner of Asian Championships in 1968
- (Japan) Tomie Okawa: winner of World Championships in 1956
- (Japan) Seiji Ono: winner of World Championships in 1979
- (Czechoslovakia) Milan Orlowski: winner of European Championships in 1974
- (Germany) Dimitrij Ovtcharov: Olympic bronze medal at London 2012, winner of European Championships in 2013

== P ==
- (North Korea) Pak Yung-Sun: winner of World Championships in 1975, 1977
- (South Korea) Park Hae-Jung
- (South Korea) Park Mi-Young
- (England) Jill Parker-Hammersley-Shirley: winner of European Championships in 1976
- (Poland) Natalia Partyka
- (Lithuania) Rūta Paškauskienė: winner of European Championships in 2008
- (Belarus) Veronika Pavlovich
- (Belarus) Viktoria Pavlovich: winner of European Championships in 2010, 2012
- (Socialist Federal Republic of Yugoslavia) Gordana Perkucin
- (England) Fred Perry: winner of World Championships in 1929
- (Sweden) Jörgen Persson: winner of World Championships in 1991; winner of World Cup in 1991; winner of European Championships in 1986
- (Ukraine) Margaryta Pesotska
- (Soviet Union) (Slovakia) Valentina Popova: winner of European Championships in 1980, 1984
- (Hungary) Georgina Póta
- (England) Carl Prean
- (Socialist Federal Republic of Yugoslavia) (Croatia) Zoran Primorac: winner of World Cup in 1993, 1997
- (Austria) Gertrude Pritzi: winner of World Championships in 1937, 1938

== Q ==
- (China) Qi Baoxiang: winner of Asian Championships in 1980
- (China) Qiao Hong: Olympic silver medal at Barcelona 1992; Olympic bronze medal at Atlanta 1996; winner of World Championships in 1989; winner of Asian Championships in 1990
- (China) Qiao Yunping
- (China) Qiu Zhonghui: winner of World Championships in 1961

== R ==
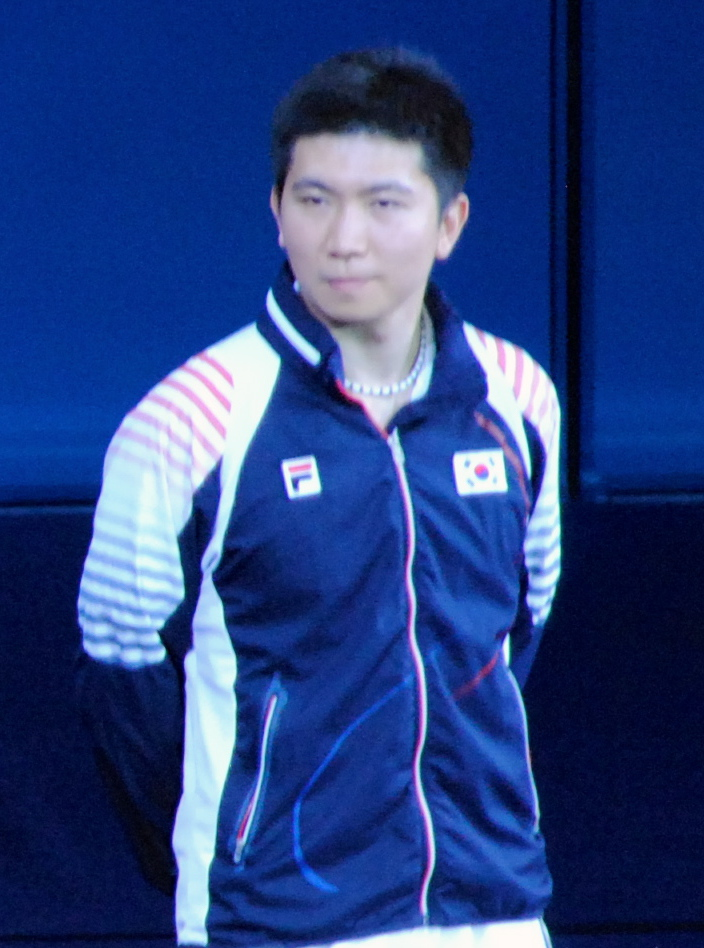
Ryu Seung-Min: Olympic gold medal at Athens

- (China) Rong Guotuan: winner of World Championships in 1959
- (Germany) Jörg Roßkopf: Olympic bronze medal at Atlanta 1996; winner of World Cup in 1998; winner of European Championships in 1992
- (England) Rosalind Rowe
- (Romania) Angelica Rozeanu: winner of World Championships in 1950, 1951, 1952, 1953, 1954, 1955
- (Soviet Union) Zoja Rudnova: winner of European Championships in 1970, 1972
- (Croatia) Tan Ruiwu
- (South Korea) Ryu Ji-Hae
- (South Korea) Ryu Seung-Min: Olympic gold medal at Athens 2004

== S ==
- (Belgium) Jean-Michel Saive: winner of European Championships in 1994
- (Romania) Elizabeta Samara
- (Belarus) Vladimir Samsonov: winner of World Cup in 1999, 2001, 2009; winner of European Championships in 1998, 2003, 2005
- (Japan) Hiroji Satoh: winner of World Championships in 1952
- (Austria) Werner Schlager: winner of World Championships in 2003
- (England) (West Germany) Diane Scholer-Rowe
- (France) Jacques Secrétin: winner of European Championships in 1976
- (Japan) Masako Seki: winner of Asian Championships in 1964
- (South Korea) Seok Eun-Mi
- (China) Shi Zhihao: winner of Asian Championships in 1980
- (Hungary) Ferenc Sido: winner of World Championships in 1953
- (Hungary) (Netherlands) (West Germany) Agnes Simon: winner of European Championships in 1962
- (Hungary) Anna Sipos: winner of World Championships in 1932, 1933
- (Russia) Kirill Skachkov
- (Russia) Alexey Smirnov
- (Italy) Nikoleta Stefanova
- (Romania) Mihaela Steff
- (Socialist Federal Republic of Yugoslavia) Antun Stipančić
- (Czechoslovakia) **Ladislav Stipek**
- (Germany) Nicole Struse: winner of European Championships in 1996
- (Hong Kong) Suh Sui Cho: winner of Asian Championships in 1952
- (Singapore) Sun Beibei
- (China) Sun Jin
- (Socialist Federal Republic of Yugoslavia) Dragutin Surbek: winner of European Championships in 1968
- (Germany) Christian Süß
- (Sweden) Marie Svensson: winner of European Championships in 1994
- (England) Matthew Syed
- (Hungary) Miklos Szabados: winner of World Championships in 1931

== T ==
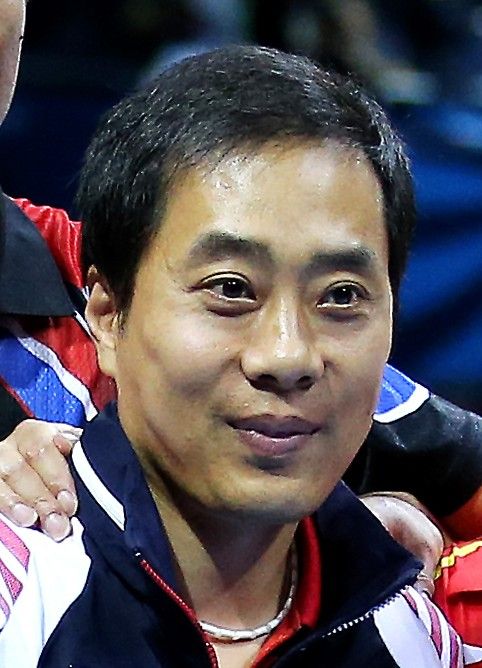
Yoo Nam-Kyu: Olympic gold medal at Seoul

- (Japan) Hiroshi Takahashi: winner of Asian Championships in 1963
- (Italy) Wenling Tan Monfardini
- (Japan) Toshiaki Tanaka: winner of World Championships in 1955, 1957
- (China) (Hong Kong) Tang Peng
- (China) Tang Weiyi: winner of Asian Championships in 1992
- (China) Teng Yi: winner of World Cup in 1987
- (Croatia) Tian Yuan
- (Hong Kong) Tie Yana
- (Netherlands) Elena Timina
- (Czechoslovakia) **Frantisek Tokar**
- (Sweden) Truls Möregårdh
- (Slovenia) Bojan Tokic
- (China) Tong Ling: winner of World Championships in 1981
- (Hungary) Krisztina Tóth
- (Denmark) Finn Tugwell

== U ==
- (Czechoslovakia) Ilona Uhlikova-Vostova: winner of European Championships in 1968

== V ==
- (Czechoslovakia) Bohumil Vana: winner of World Championships in 1938, 1947
- (Philippines) Aljay Villena
- (Czechoslovakia) **Vera Votrubcova**
- (Hungary) Bela Von Kehrling
- (Sweden) Thomas von Scheele
- (Netherlands) Bettine Vriesekoop: winner of European Championships in 1982, 1992

== W ==
- (Sweden) Jan-Ove Waldner: Olympic gold medal at Barcelona 1992; Olympic silver medal at Sydney 2000; winner of World Championships in 1989, 1997; winner of World Cup in 1990; winner of European Championships in 1996
- (China) Wang Chuqin
- (China) Wang Hao: Olympic silver medal at Athens 2004; Olympic silver medal at Beijing 2008; Olympic silver medal at London 2012; winner of World Championships in 2009; winner of World Cup in 2007, 2008, 2010; winner of Asian Championships in 2003, 2007
- (China) Wang Liqin: Olympic bronze medal at Athens 2004; Olympic bronze medal at Beijing 2008; winner of World Championships in 2001, 2005, 2007; winner of Asian Championships in 1998, 2005
- (China) Wang Nan: Olympic gold medal at Sydney 2000; Olympic silver medal at Beijing 2008; winner of World Championships in 1999, 2001, 2003; winner of World Cup in 1997, 1998, 2003, 2007
- (China) Wang Tao: Olympic silver medal at Atlanta 1996; winner of Asian Championships in 1990
- (Singapore) Wang Yuegu
- (China) (Japan) Wei Qingguang
- (China) (Germany) Wu Jiaduo: winner of European Championships in 2009
- (China) Wu Yang

== X ==
- (China) Xi Enting: winner of World Championships in 1973
- (China) Xie Chaojie: winner of Asian Championships in 1992
- (China) Xie Saike: winner of Asian Championships in 1984
- (Poland) Xu Jie
- (China) Xu Xin
- (China) **Xu Yinsheng**

== Y ==
- (China) Yan An
- (China) Yan Sen
- (China) Yang Ying
- (South Korea) Yang Young-Ja
- (South Korea) Yoo Nam-Kyu: Olympic gold medal at Seoul 1988
- (South Korea) Yoon Jae-Young
- (South Korea) Yoon Ki-Sook: winner of Asian Championships in 1967
- (Japan) Kaii Yoshida
- (Singapore) Yu Mengyu
- (North Korea) Yu Sun-Bok

== Z ==
- (Romania) **Ella Zeller**
- (China) **Zhang Deying**
- (China) Zhang Jike: Olympic gold medal at London 2012; winner of World Championships in 2011, 2013; winner of World Cup in 2011
- (China) Zhang Li: winner of Asian Championships in 1976
- (China) **Zhang Xielin**
- (China) Zhang Yining: Olympic gold medal at Athens 2004; Olympic gold medal at Beijing 2008; winner of World Championships in 2005, 2009; winner of World Cup in 2001, 2002, 2004, 2005; winner of Asian Championships in 2007
- (China) Zhuang Zedong: winner of World Championships in 1961, 1963, 1965
