= 1993 World Table Tennis Championships – Men's doubles =

1993 Men's doubles

The 1993 World Table Tennis Championships men's doubles was the 42nd edition of the men's doubles championship. Wang Tao and Lü Lin won the title after defeating Ma Wenge and Zhang Lei in the final by three sets to one. The matches were best of five sets from the quarter-final stage.

== Results ==
Round of 16
(China) Wang Tao (China) Lü Lin	21	21
(Denmark) Allan Bentsen (Denmark) Kim Høgsberg	8	15
(Canada) Wenguan Johnny Huang (England) Carl Prean	14	19
(Sweden) Jörgen Persson (Sweden) Erik Lindh	21	21
(Sweden) Jan-Ove Waldner (Sweden) Mikael Appelgren	22	21
(North Korea) Kim Song Hui (North Korea) Li Sung-il	20	19
(Chinese Taipei) Chiang Peng-lung (Chinese Taipei) Feng Sheng-Chin	13	12
(South Korea) Yoo Nam-kyu (South Korea) Kim Taek-soo	21	21
(Hungary) Zoltan Harczi (Hungary) Zoltan Bátorfi	18	14
(China) Liu Guoliang (China) Lin Zhigang	21	21
(North Korea) Kim Myong Jun (North Korea) Choi Gyong Sop	21	21
(France) Jean-Philippe Gatien (France) Damien Éloi	19	9
(South Korea) Kang Hee-chan (South Korea) Lee Chul-seung	21	21
(Poland) Andrzej Grubba (Socialist Federal Republic of Yugoslavia) Zoran Kalinić	16	14
(China) Ma Wenge (China) Zhang Lei	21	21
(Netherlands) Trinko Keen (Netherlands) Danny Heister	8	15

Quarterfinals
(China) Wang Tao (China) Lü Lin	14	21	21	21
(Sweden) Persson (Sweden) Lindh	21	13	15	10
(Sweden) Waldner (Sweden) Appelgren	16	21	13	21	15
(South Korea) Yoo Nam-kyu (South Korea) Kim Taek-soo	21	17	21	15	21
(China) Liu Guoliang (China) Lin Zhigang	21	21	21
(North Korea) Kim Myong Jun (North Korea) Choi Gyong Sop	12	8	15
(South Korea) Kang Hee-chan (South Korea) Lee Chul-seung	15	9	21	19
(China) Ma Wenge (China) Zhang Lei	21	21	15	21

Semifinals
(China) Wang Tao (China) Lü Lin	22	26	21	22
(South Korea) Yoo Nam-kyu (South Korea) Kim Taek-soo	20	28	16	20
(China) Liu Guoliang (China) Lin Zhigang	11	12	18
(China) Ma Wenge (China) Zhang Lei	21	21	21

Final
(China) Wang Tao (China) Lü Lin	18	21	21	21
(China) Ma Wenge (China) Zhang Lei	21	12	13	15

== See also ==
List of World Table Tennis Championships medalists
