= 1995 World Table Tennis Championships =

1995 edition of the World Table Tennis Championships

The 1995 World Table Tennis Championships were held in Tianjin from May 1 to May 14, 1995.

== Results ==
=== Team ===
Event	Gold	Silver	Bronze
Swaythling Cup; Men's Team	China; Ding Song; Kong Linghui; Liu Guoliang; Ma Wenge; Wang Tao	Sweden; Mikael Appelgren; Peter Karlsson; Erik Lindh; Jörgen Persson; Jan-Ove Waldner	South Korea; Chu Kyo-sung; Kim Bong-chul; Kim Taek-soo; Lee Chul-seung; Yoo Nam-kyu
Corbillon Cup; Women's Team	China; Deng Yaping; Liu Wei; Qiao Hong; Qiao Yunping	South Korea; Kim Moo-kyo; Park Hae-jung; Park Kyung-Ae; Ryu Ji-hae	Hong Kong; Chai Po Wa; Chan Tan Lui; Tong Wun; Wan Shuk Kwan

=== Individual ===
Event	Gold	Silver	Bronze
Men's singles	(China) Kong Linghui	(China) Liu Guoliang	(China) Ding Song
Men's singles	(China) Kong Linghui	(China) Liu Guoliang	(China) Wang Tao
Women's singles	(China) Deng Yaping	(China) Qiao Hong	(China) Liu Wei
Women's singles	(China) Deng Yaping	(China) Qiao Hong	(China) Qiao Yunping
Men's doubles	(China) Lü Lin (China) Wang Tao	(Croatia) Zoran Primorac (Belarus) Vladimir Samsonov	(China) Lin Zhigang (China) Liu Guoliang
Men's doubles	(China) Lü Lin (China) Wang Tao	(Croatia) Zoran Primorac (Belarus) Vladimir Samsonov	(France) Damien Eloi (France) Jean-Philippe Gatien
Women's doubles	(China) Deng Yaping (China) Qiao Hong	(China) Liu Wei (China) Qiao Yunping	(China) Wang Chen (China) Wu Na
Women's doubles	(China) Deng Yaping (China) Qiao Hong	(China) Liu Wei (China) Qiao Yunping	(Hungary) Csilla Bátorfi (Hungary) Krisztina Tóth
Mixed doubles	(China) Wang Tao (China) Liu Wei	(China) Kong Linghui (China) Deng Yaping	(South Korea) Lee Chul-seung (South Korea) Ryu Ji-hae
Mixed doubles	(China) Wang Tao (China) Liu Wei	(China) Kong Linghui (China) Deng Yaping	(Sweden) Erik Lindh (Sweden) Marie Svensson
