= 1993 World Table Tennis Championships – Women's team =

1993 Corbillon Cup (women's team)

The 1993 World Table Tennis Championships – Corbillon Cup (women's team) was the 35th edition of the women's team championship.

China won the gold medal defeating North Korea in the final 3–0. South Korea won the bronze medal.

== Medalists ==
Event	Gold	Silver	Bronze
	China; Chen Zihe; Deng Yaping; Gao Jun; Qiao Hong	North Korea; An Hui-Suk; Li Bun-Hui; Wi Bok-Sun; Yu Sun-bok	South Korea; Hong Cha-Ok; Hong Soon-hwa; Hyun Jung-Hwa; Park Hae-Jung

== Final stage knockout phase ==
=== Quarter finals ===
Team One	Team Two	Score
China	Chinese Taipei	3–0
North Korea	Japan	3–1
South Korea	Germany	3–1
Hong Kong	Russia	3–1

=== Semifinals ===
Team One	Team Two	Score
North Korea	South Korea	3–1
China	Hong Kong	3–0

=== Third-place playoff ===
Team One	Team Two	Score
South Korea	Hong Kong	3–0

=== Final ===
Team One	Team Two	Score
China	North Korea	3–0

== See also ==
List of World Table Tennis Championships medalists
