= 1993 World Table Tennis Championships – Women's singles =

1993 World Table Tennis Championships - Women's singles

The 1993 World Table Tennis Championships women's singles was the 42nd edition of the women's singles championship. Hyun Jung-hwa defeated Chen Jing in the final by three sets to none to win the title.

== Results ==
Round of 16
(Romania) Otilia Bădescu	21	22	19	13	21
(Singapore) Jun Hong Jing	17	20	21	21	19
(North Korea) Ri Pun-hui	21	21	21
(China) Wu Na	16	19	11
(China) Chen Zihe	22	13	21	21
(Japan) He Zhili-Chire Koyama	20	21	10	13
(South Korea) Hyun Jung-hwa	21	21	25
(China) Tang Weiyi	12	18	23
(China) Gao Jun	21	21	21
(Belarus) Tatyana Kostromina	12	19	17
(Germany) Nicole Struse	21	21	21
(North Korea) Yu Sun-bok	15	12	13
(China) Zheng Yuan	21	18	21	21
(Hong Kong) Chai Po Wa	16	21	11	10
(Chinese Taipei) Chen Jing	19	21	21	21
(Germany) Jie Schöpp	21	12	18	19

Quarterfinals
(Romania) Bădescu	21	21	20	21
(North Korea) Ri Pun-hui	13	13	22	19
(China) Chen Zihe	17	19	8
(South Korea) Hyun Jung-hwa	21	21	21
(China) Gao Jun	21	21	21
(Germany) Struse	17	17	10
(China) Zheng Yuan	17	23	22	17
(Chinese Taipei) Chen Jing	21	25	20	21

Semifinals
(Romania) Bădescu	21	17	20	21	20
(South Korea) Hyun Jung-hwa	17	21	22	11	22
(China) Gao Jun	9	15	14
(Chinese Taipei) Chen Jing	21	21	21

Final
(South Korea) Hyun Jung-hwa	21	21	21
(Chinese Taipei) Chen Jing	16	15	14

== See also ==
1993 World Table Tennis Championships

List of World Table Tennis Championships medalists
