= Oliver Alke =

German table tennis player

Personal information
- Nationality: Germany
- Born: 2 November 1970 (age 55) Hamburg
Medal record
Representing Germany
World Table Tennis Championships
Bronze medal – third place	1993	Men's Team

Oliver Alke is a male former international table tennis player from Germany.

He won a bronze medal at the 1993 World Table Tennis Championships in the Swaythling Cup (men's team event) with Steffen Fetzner, Peter Franz, Richard Prause and Jörg Roßkopf for Germany.

== See also ==
- List of table tennis players
- List of World Table Tennis Championships medalists
