= Peter Franz =

German table tennis player

Personal information
- Nationality: Germany
- Born: 25 April 1971 (age 55) Stolzenau, West Germany
Medal record
Representing Germany
World Table Tennis Championships
Bronze medal – third place	1993	Men's Team

Peter Franz (born 25 April 1971) is a male former international table tennis player from Germany. He competed at the 1996 Summer Olympics and the 2000 Summer Olympics.

He won a bronze medal at the 1993 World Table Tennis Championships in the Swaythling Cup (men's team event) with Steffen Fetzner, Richard Prause, Oliver Alke and Jörg Roßkopf for Germany.

== See also ==
- List of table tennis players
- List of World Table Tennis Championships medalists
