= Richard Prause =

German table tennis player

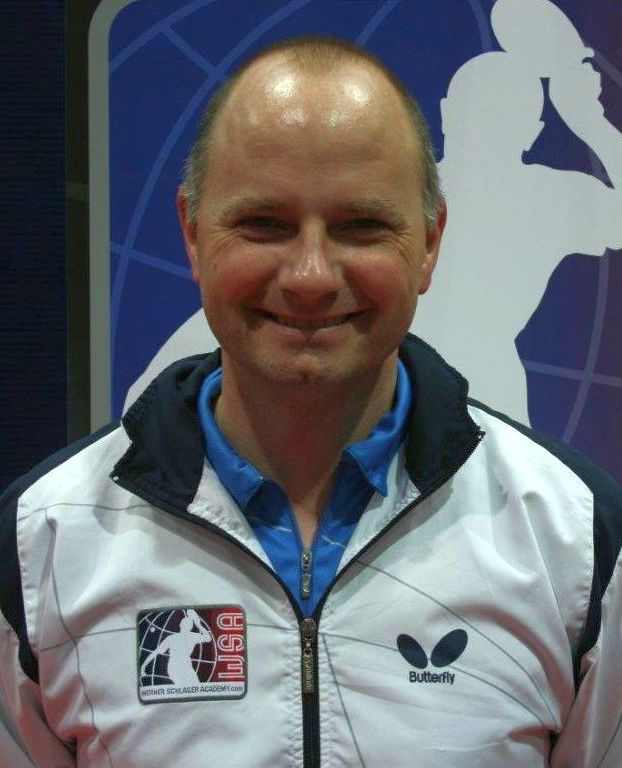

Personal information
- Nationality: Germany
- Born: 9 March 1968 (age 58) Oberhausen
Medal record
Representing Germany
World Table Tennis Championships
Bronze medal – third place	1993	Men's Team

Richard Prause is a German former international table tennis player.

He won a bronze medal at the 1993 World Table Tennis Championships in the Swaythling Cup (men's team event) with Steffen Fetzner, Peter Franz, Oliver Alke and Jörg Roßkopf for Germany.

From 1999 to 2010 he was the national coach of the men's team and since August 2015 has been the sporting director of the German Table Tennis Association.

== See also ==
- List of table tennis players
- List of World Table Tennis Championships medalists
