= Sejal Nagjee =

Indian Business Women and Table Tennis player

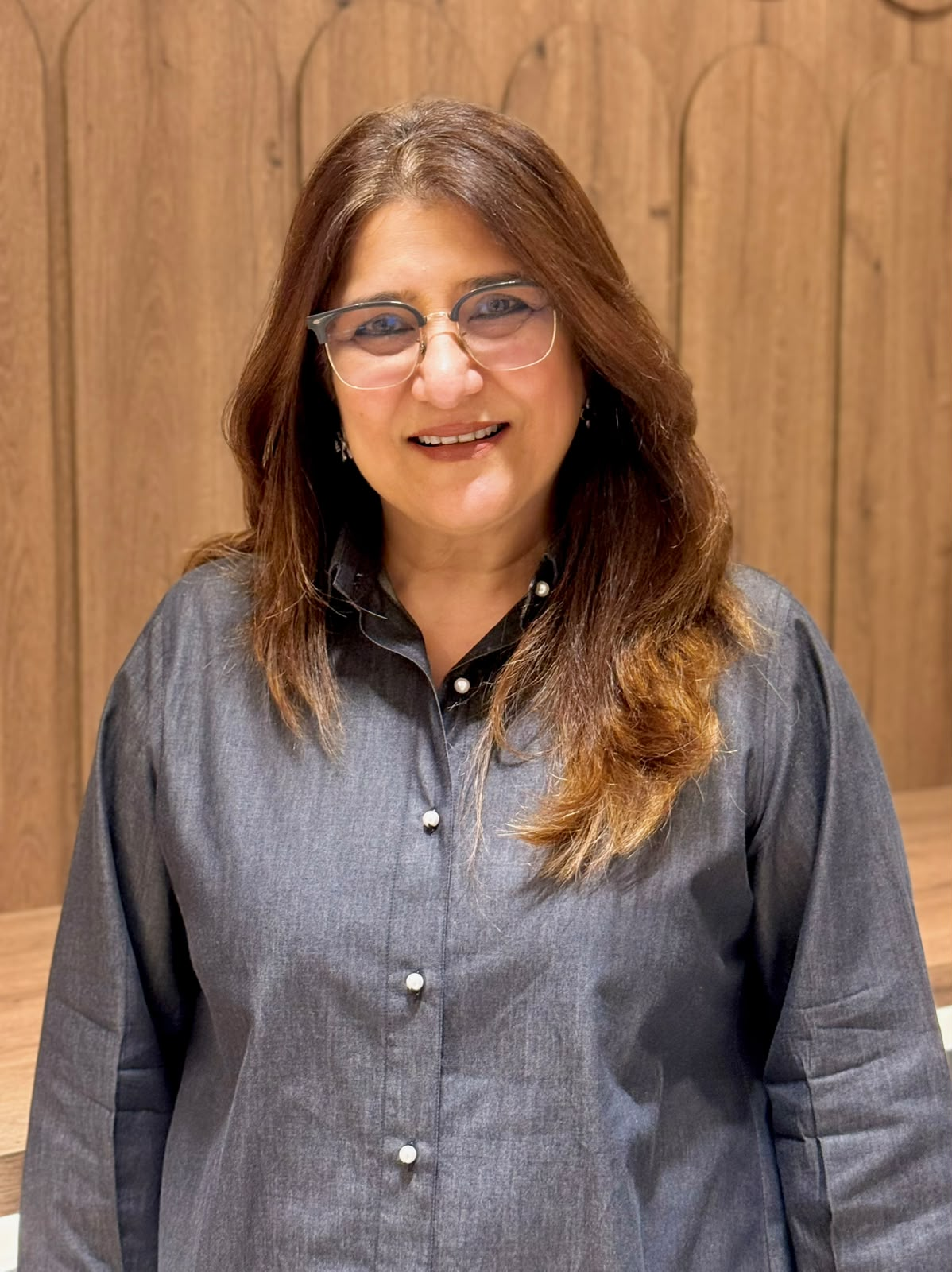
- Born: Sejal Shah; June 30, 1967 (age 59); Mumbai, India
- Occupations: Interior/Landscape Designer, table tennis player
- Known for: table tennis, Designing

Sejal Nagjee is an Indian businesswoman, designer, and former professional table tennis player.

She is the founder and Creative Director of Milestone Dubai, a design and build company based in the United Arab Emirates (UAE).

Prior to her business career, she represented India in Table tennis at multiple international championships.

== Early life & Education ==
Sejal Shah was born on 30 June 1967 in Mumbai, Maharashtra, India, to Shirish Shah and Aruna Shah. Her father, an electrical engineer and serial entrepreneur, is a sitar player for over 77 years and significantly contributed as her coach and mentor during her athletic career. Her mother possessed a master's degree in sociology and psychology and was an accomplished artist specializing in Batik. She instructed at SNDT College in Mumbai and fostered her daughters' creative growth.

She did her schooling from New Era School in Mumbai and then got a Bachelor of Commerce degree in accounting and finance from Mumbai University. Along with her studies, she learned Bharatanatyam dance, Indian classical music, Painting, Ikebana and Bonsai.

== Career ==
=== Sports career ===
Nagjee was active in professional table tennis from the early 1980s through the mid-1990s.

Sejal Nagjee represented India at the 1983 Asian Junior Table Tennis Championships in Bahrain. She also won gold with the Indian women's team and women's double at the 3rd South Asian Federation (SAF) Games in 1987.

Nagjee also won bronze in women's doubles at the 4th SAF Games in 1989.

She also represented India at the 1990 10th Asian Table Tennis Championships and the 41st World Table Tennis Championships in 1991.

=== Design career ===
In 2000, Sejal Nagjee launched Pure Joy, her first design company, which began by producing and selling more than 25,000 floral artifacts through lifestyle stores in Mumbai.

Nagjee moved to Dubai in 2003, where she established her second floral design studio. Her work quickly attracted recognition from hotels and event clients, leading to the expansion of services into interior design, landscaping, and pool design within a year.

Sejal Nagjee founded Milestone Dubai, which has since completed over a thousand residential and commercial projects in the UAE. The company provides services in villa renovations, interior fit-outs, landscaping, swimming pools, and carpentry.

== Personal life ==
Sejal has been married for over 25 years to the Indian businessman Rajesh Nagjee. Together, they have a son named Jay.

== Awards & honors ==
- Luxury Lifestyle Awards, 2025
- Top 10 Best Women Founders in the Middle East 2024
- Greatest Leaders 2023-24
- Shiv Chhatrapati Award (1991–92) for her contributions to Indian sports in 1994.
