= Table tennis at the 1992 Summer Olympics =

Table tennis at the Games of the XXV Olympiad
- Venue: Estació del Nord Sports Hall
- Dates: 28 July to 6 August 1992
- Competitors: 159 from 48 nations

The table tennis competition at the 1992 Summer Olympics consisted of four events. Bronze medal match was dropped with both losing semi-finalists receiving bronze medals, but it was brought back in Atlanta 1996.

== Participating nations ==
A total of 159 athletes (80 men and 79 women), representing 48 NOCs, competed in four events.

- Argentina (2)
- Australia (2)
- Austria (2)
- Belgium (2)
- Brazil (4)
- Bulgaria (1)
- Canada (2)
- Chile (3)
- China (8)
- Croatia (2)
- Cuba (4)
- Czechoslovakia (5)
- Ecuador (1)
- Egypt (2)
- Estonia (1)
- France (6)
- Germany (5)
- Ghana (2)
- Great Britain (6)
- Hong Kong (4)
- Hungary (1)
- India (4)
- Independent Olympic Athletes (5)
- Indonesia (3)
- Iran (1)
- Italy (1)
- Jamaica (1)
- Japan (8)
- Jordan (1)
- Libya (1)
- Morocco (1)
- Netherlands (3)
- New Zealand (3)
- Nigeria (6)
- North Korea (8)
- Peru (4)
- Poland (3)
- Romania (4)
- Saudi Arabia (1)
- Slovenia (1)
- South Africa (2)
- South Korea (8)
- Spain (4)
- Sweden (6)
- Tunisia (3)
- Uganda (1)
- Unified Team (6)
- United States (5)

== Medal summary ==
Event	Gold	Silver	Bronze
Men's singles	Jan-Ove Waldner; Sweden	Jean-Philippe Gatien; France	Kim Taek-soo; South Korea
Men's singles	Jan-Ove Waldner; Sweden	Jean-Philippe Gatien; France	Ma Wenge; China
Men's doubles	Lü Lin / Wang Tao (CHN)	Steffen Fetzner / Jörg Roßkopf (GER)	Kang Hee-chan / Lee Chul-seung (KOR)
Men's doubles	Lü Lin / Wang Tao (CHN)	Steffen Fetzner / Jörg Roßkopf (GER)	Kim Taek-soo / Yoo Nam-kyu (KOR)
Women's singles	Deng Yaping; China	Qiao Hong; China	Li Bun-hui; North Korea
Women's singles	Deng Yaping; China	Qiao Hong; China	Hyun Jung-hwa; South Korea
Women's doubles	Deng Yaping / Qiao Hong (CHN)	Chen Zihe / Gao Jun (CHN)	Li Bun-hui / Yu Sun-bok (PRK)
Women's doubles	Deng Yaping / Qiao Hong (CHN)	Chen Zihe / Gao Jun (CHN)	Hyun Jung-hwa / Hong Cha-ok (KOR)

== Medal table ==
Rank	Nation	Gold	Silver	Bronze	Total
1	China	3	2	1	6
2	Sweden	1	0	0	1
3	France	0	1	0	1
3	Germany	0	1	0	1
5	South Korea	0	0	5	5
6	North Korea	0	0	2	2
Totals (6 entries)		4	4	8	16

== Sources ==
- Official Olympic Report
- International Table Tennis Federation (ITTF)
- "Table Tennis at the 1992 Barcelona Summer Games". www.sports-reference.com. Archived from the original on 17 April 2020.
