= Wi Bok-sun =

North Korean table tennis player

Wi Bok-Sun
Personal information
- Nationality: North Korea
Medal record
Representing North Korea
World Table Tennis Championships
Silver medal – second place	1993	women's team

Wi Bok-Sun (Korean: 위복순, born 8 July 1974) is a former international table tennis player from North Korea.

== Table tennis career ==
She won a silver medal for North Korea at the 1993 World Table Tennis Championships in the Corbillon Cup (women's team event) with Li Bun-Hui, An Hui-Suk and Yu Sun-bok.

She also competed at the 1992 Summer Olympics, and reached the women's doubles quarter finals during the 1993 World Championships.

== See also ==
- List of World Table Tennis Championships medalists
