= Vivien Ello =

Hungarian table tennis player (born 1974)

Personal information
- Nationality: Hungarian
- Born: 1974 (age 51–52)

Sport
- Sport: Table tennis

Vivien Ello (born 1974) is a Hungarian table tennis player. Her highest career ITTF ranking was 67.
