= Thomas von Scheele =

Swedish table tennis player

Personal information
- Full name: Thomas von Scheele
- Nationality: Sweden
- Born: 13 March 1969 (age 57)

Sport
- Sport: Table tennis
Medal record
Men's table tennis
Representing Sweden
World Championships
| Gold medal – first place | 1991 Chiba City | Doubles |
European Championships
| Gold medal – first place | 1996 Bratislava | Team |
| Silver medal – second place | 1994 Birmingham | Team |
| Bronze medal – third place | 1992 Stuttgart | Doubles |
| Bronze medal – third place | 1992 Stuttgart | Mixed Doubles |
| Bronze medal – third place | 1990 Gothenburg | Doubles |

Thomas von Scheele (born 13 March 1969) is a left-handed Swedish table tennis player. He competed in the men's doubles event at the 1996 Summer Olympics.

He won a gold medal in the double event of the World Table Tennis Championships in 1991 with Peter Karlsson. He also won several medals in the European Table Tennis Championships. He later became a coach of Sweden's women table tennis team.

== See also ==
- List of table tennis players
