= Lin Zhigang =

Chinese table tennis player

Personal information
- Nationality: China
- Born: 1970 (age 55–56)
Medal record
Representing China
World Table Tennis Championships
Bronze medal – third place	1993	Men's Doubles
Bronze medal – third place	1995	Men's Doubles

Lin Zhigang (born 1970) is a Chinese former international table tennis player.

He won a bronze medal at the 1993 World Table Tennis Championships and 1995 World Table Tennis Championships in the men's doubles with Liu Guoliang.

Lin Zhigang is married to table tennis legend Deng Yaping.

== See also ==
- List of table tennis players
