= Table tennis at the 1996 Summer Olympics =

Table tennis at the Games of the XXVI Olympiad
- Venue: Georgia World Congress Center
- Dates: 20 July to 4 August 1996
- Competitors: 166 from 51 nations

The table tennis competition at the 1996 Summer Olympics consisted of four events.

== Participating nations ==
A total of 166 athletes (85 men and 81 women), representing 51 NOCs, competed in four events.

- Australia (5)
- Austria (4)
- Belarus (2)
- Belgium (2)
- Bosnia and Herzegovina (1)
- Brazil (4)
- Canada (5)
- Chile (4)
- China (8)
- Croatia (4)
- Czech Republic (3)
- Dominican Republic (1)
- France (6)
- Germany (7)
- Ghana (2)
- Great Britain (4)
- Greece (2)
- Hong Kong (4)
- Hungary (4)
- India (2)
- Indonesia (2)
- Italy (3)
- Jamaica (2)
- Japan (8)
- Kuwait (1)
- Lebanon (1)
- Lithuania (1)
- Mexico (1)
- Netherlands (6)
- New Zealand (1)
- Nigeria (4)
- North Korea (7)
- Peru (2)
- Poland (2)
- Qatar (1)
- Romania (5)
- Russia (4)
- Singapore (1)
- Slovakia (1)
- South Korea (8)
- Sudan (1)
- Sweden (7)
- Switzerland (1)
- Chinese Taipei (6)
- Trinidad and Tobago (1)
- Tunisia (1)
- Turkmenistan (1)
- Uganda (3)
- United States (6)
- Venezuela (1)
- FR Yugoslavia (3)

== Medal table ==
Rank	Nation	Gold	Silver	Bronze	Total
1	China	4	3	1	8
2	Chinese Taipei	0	1	0	1
3	South Korea	0	0	2	2
4	Germany	0	0	1	1
Totals (4 entries)		4	4	4	12

== Medal summary ==
Event	Gold	Silver	Bronze
Men's singles	Liu Guoliang; China	Wang Tao; China	Jörg Roßkopf; Germany
Men's doubles	Liu Guoliang / Kong Linghui (CHN)	Lü Lin / Wang Tao (CHN)	Lee Chul-seung / Yoo Nam-kyu (KOR)
Women's singles	Deng Yaping; China	Chen Jing; Chinese Taipei	Qiao Hong; China
Women's doubles	Deng Yaping / Qiao Hong (CHN)	Liu Wei / Qiao Yunping (CHN)	Park Hae-jung / Ryu Ji-hae (KOR)

== Sources ==
- Official Olympic Report
- International Table Tennis Federation (ITTF)
- "Table Tennis at the 1996 Atlanta Summer Games". www.sports-reference.com. Archived from the original on 17 April 2020.
