= Wu Na =

Chinese table tennis player

Personal information
- Nationality: China
- Born: 14 January 1974 (age 52)
Medal record
Representing China
World Table Tennis Championships
Bronze medal – third place	1995	Women's Doubles
Gold medal – first place	1997	Mixed Doubles
Bronze medal – third place	1997	Women's Singles

Wu Na (born 1974) is a Chinese former international table tennis player.

== Career ==
She won a bronze medal at the 1995 World Table Tennis Championships in the women's doubles with Wang Chen. Two years later she won a gold medal in the mixed doubles with Liu Guoliang and bronze in the singles at the 1997 World Table Tennis Championships.

== Personal life ==
She is married to footballer Shang Yi and their son Shang Juncheng is a professional tennis player.

== See also ==
- List of table tennis players
