= Li Sung-il =

North Korean table tennis player

Li Sung Il
Personal information
- Nationality: North Korea
Medal record
Representing North Korea
World Table Tennis Championships
Bronze medal – third place	1993	Mixed Doubles

- Korean name
- Hangul: 리승일
- RR: Ri Seungil
- MR: Ri Sŭngil

Li Sung-Il is a male North Korean former international table tennis player.

He won a bronze medal at the 1993 World Table Tennis Championships in the mixed doubles with Yu Sun-bok.

== See also ==
- List of table tennis players
