= An Hui-suk =

North Korean table tennis player

An Hui-Suk
Personal information
- Native name: 안희숙
- Nationality: North Korea
Medal record
Representing North Korea
World Table Tennis Championships
Silver medal – second place	1993	women's team

An Hui-Suk is a former international table tennis player from North Korea.

== Table tennis career ==
She won a silver medal for North Korea at the 1993 World Table Tennis Championships in the Corbillon Cup (women's team event) with Li Bun-Hui, Wi Bok-Sun and Yu Sun-bok.

She also reached the women's doubles quarter finals during the 1993 World Championships.

== See also ==
- List of World Table Tennis Championships medalists
