= Table tennis at the 2004 Summer Olympics =

Table tennis at the Games of the XXVIII Olympiad
- Venue: Galatsi Olympic Hall
- Dates: 14–23 August 2004
- Competitors: 172 from 50 nations

Table tennis at the 2004 Summer Olympics took place in the Galatsi Olympic Hall with 172 competitors in 4 events.

== Participating nations ==
A total of 172 athletes (86 men and 86 women), representing 50 NOCs, competed in four events.

- Algeria (5)
- Argentina (3)
- Australia (6)
- Austria (4)
- Belarus (5)
- Belgium (1)
- Bosnia and Herzegovina (1)
- Brazil (5)
- Canada (4)
- Chile (4)
- China (9)
- Croatia (3)
- Czech Republic (4)
- Denmark (2)
- Dominican Republic (2)
- Democratic Republic of the Congo (2)
- France (1)
- Germany (8)
- Greece (4)
- Honduras (1)
- Hong Kong (8)
- Hungary (3)
- India (2)
- Iran (1)
- Israel (1)
- Italy (5)
- Japan (8)
- Jordan (1)
- Netherlands (2)
- New Zealand (2)
- Nigeria (8)
- North Korea (4)
- Peru (1)
- Poland (2)
- Romania (4)
- Russia (6)
- Saudi Arabia (1)
- Senegal (1)
- Serbia and Montenegro (3)
- Singapore (4)
- South Korea (9)
- Spain (1)
- Sweden (3)
- Chinese Taipei (4)
- Thailand (1)
- Tunisia (2)
- United States (7)
- Uzbekistan (1)
- Venezuela (2)
- Vietnam (1)

== Medal summary ==
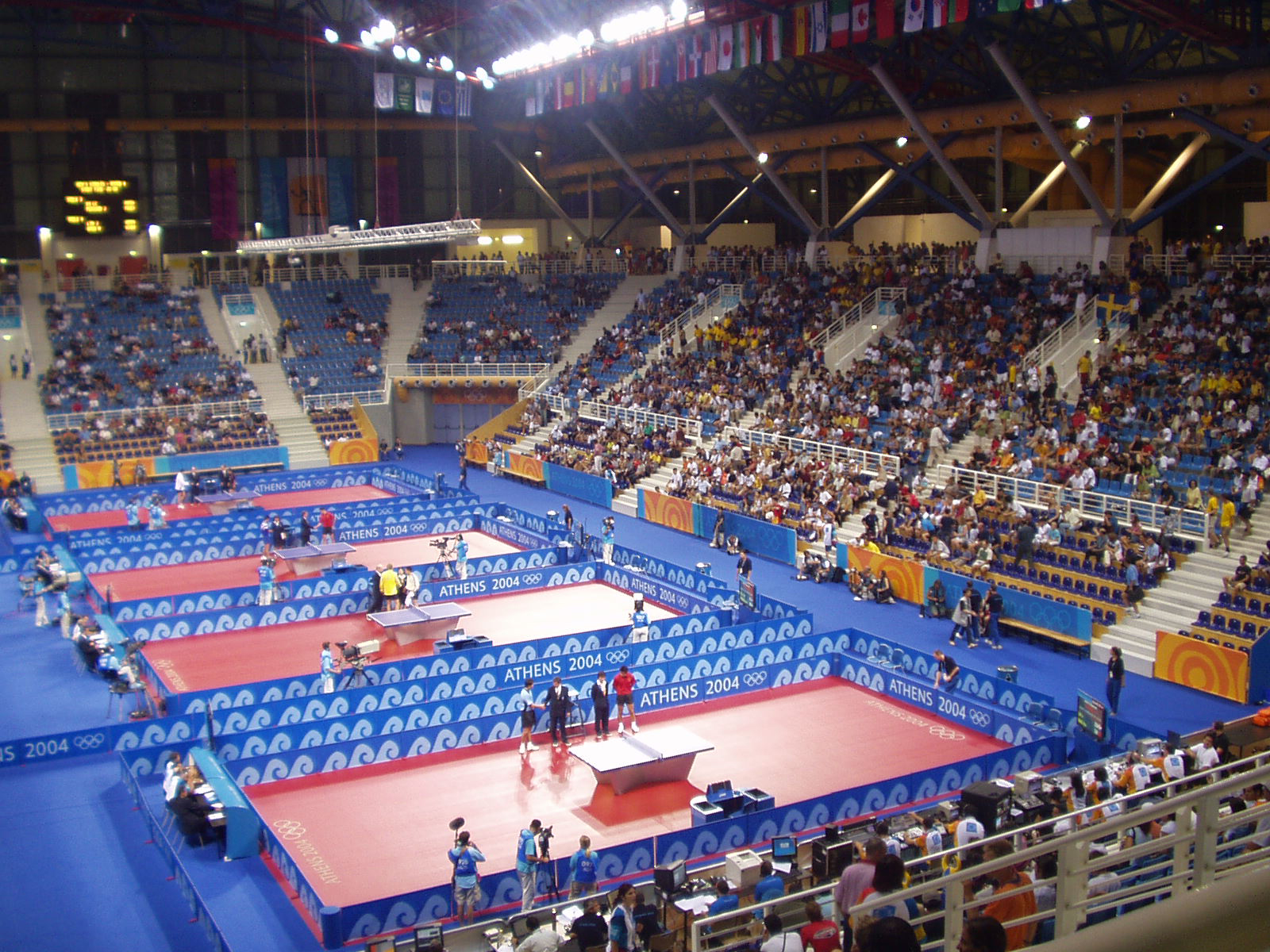
Interior view of the Galatsi Olympic Hall, during the 2004 Summer Olympics

| Event | Gold | Silver | Bronze |
|---|---|---|---|
| Men's singles | Ryu Seung-min; South Korea | Wang Hao; China | Wang Liqin; China |
| Men's doubles | Chen Qi / Ma Lin; China | Ko Lai Chak / Li Ching; Hong Kong | Michael Maze / Finn Tugwell; Denmark |
| Women's singles | Zhang Yining; China | Kim Hyang-mi; North Korea | Kim Kyung-ah; South Korea |
| Women's doubles | Wang Nan / Zhang Yining; China | Lee Eun-sil / Seok Eun-mi; South Korea | Guo Yue / Niu Jianfeng; China |

== Medal table ==
| Rank | Nation | Gold | Silver | Bronze | Total |
|---|---|---|---|---|---|
| 1 | China | 3 | 1 | 2 | 6 |
| 2 | South Korea | 1 | 1 | 1 | 3 |
| 3 | Hong Kong | 0 | 1 | 0 | 1 |
| 3 | North Korea | 0 | 1 | 0 | 1 |
| 5 | Denmark | 0 | 0 | 1 | 1 |
| Totals (5 entries) | | 4 | 4 | 4 | 12 |
