= Peter Karlsson (table tennis) =

Swedish table tennis player

Personal information
- Full name: Karl Peter Karlsson
- Nationality: Sweden
- Born: 29 May 1969 (age 57) Falköping, Sweden
- Height: 1.89 m (6 ft 2 in)
- Weight: 83 kg (183 lb; 13.1 st)

Sport
- Sport: Table tennis
- Highest ranking: 11 (April 2003)
Medal record
Men's table tennis
Representing Sweden
World Championships
Gold medal – first place	1989 Dortmund	Team
Gold medal – first place	1991 Chiba	Doubles
Gold medal – first place	1991 Chiba	Team
Gold medal – first place	1993 Gothenburg	Team
Gold medal – first place	2000 Kuala Lumpur	Team
Silver medal – second place	1995 Tianjin	Team
Bronze medal – third place	2001 Osaka	Team

Karl Peter Karlsson (born 29 May 1969) is a Swedish table tennis player and coach. He was 1991 World Champion in men's doubles (with Thomas von Scheele), and 2000 European Champion in men's singles. He is married to Åsa Karlsson.

== Commitment ==
Peter Karlsson is today a member of the ‘Champions for Peace’ club, a group of 54 famous elite athletes committed to serving peace in the world through sport, created by Peace and Sport, a Monaco-based international organization.

In October 2010, Peter Karlsson visited Dili in East Timor to launch 'Ping Pong Ba Dame' (Ping Pong for Peace), an initiative from Peace and Sport and the International Table Tennis Federation (ITTF).

== Career records ==
Singles

- Olympics: round of 32 (2000, 04).
- World Championships: QF (1995, 2005).
- World Cup appearances: 6. Record: 4th (1993).
- Pro Tour winner (×1): 2002 Italian Open.
  Runner-up (×3): 1997 Austrian Open; 2003 Croatian Open; 2004 Russian Open.
- Pro Tour Grand Finals appearances: 3. Record: round of 16 (2002, 03, 04).
- European Championships: winner (2000); SF (1996).
- Europe Top-12: 2nd (1993, 98, 2001); 3rd (1994).

Men's doubles

- Olympics: round of 16 (2000).
- World Championships: winner (1991).
- Pro Tour Grand Finals appearances: 2. Record: QF (2002, 03).
- European Championships: SF (1990, 92).

Mixed doubles

- World Championships: round of 128 (1989).

Team

- World Championships: 1st (1989, 91, 93, 2000); 2nd (1995); 3rd (2001).
- World Team Cup: 2nd (1991, 94).
- European Championships: 1st (1990, 92, 96, 2000, 02); 2nd (1994).
