= Xie Chaojie =

Chinese table tennis player

Personal information
- Full name: XIE Chaojie
- Nationality: China
- Born: 10 October 1965 (age 60)

Sport
- Sport: Table tennis
Medal record
Men's table tennis
Representing China
World Championships
Silver medal – second place	1991 Chiba City	Mixed Doubles
World Cup
Gold medal – first place	1991 Barcelona	Team
Asian Championships
Gold medal – first place	1992 New Delhi	Singles
Bronze medal – third place	1992 New Delhi	Doubles
Bronze medal – third place	1992 New Delhi	Mixed Doubles
Gold medal – first place	1992 New Delhi	Team
Bronze medal – third place	1990 Kuala Lumpur	Singles
Gold medal – first place	1990 Kuala Lumpur	Team

Xie Chaojie is a male former table tennis player from China. From 1989 to 1993 he won several medals in singles, doubles, and team events in the Asian Table Tennis Championships, in the Table Tennis World Cup, and in the World Table Tennis Championships.

== See also ==
- List of table tennis players
