= Zhang Lei (table tennis) =

Chinese table tennis player

Personal information
- Nationality: China
- Born: 1968 (age 57–58)
Medal record
Representing China
World Table Tennis Championships
Silver medal – second place	1993	Men's Doubles
Silver medal – second place	1993	Men's Team

Zhang Lei is a Chinese former international table tennis player.

He won two silver medal's at the 1993 World Table Tennis Championships in the team event and in the men's doubles with Ma Wenge.

== See also ==
- List of table tennis players
