= Qiao Yunping =

Chinese table tennis player

Personal information
- Nationality: China
- Born: 13 September 1968 (age 57) Qingdao, Shandong, China

Sport
- Sport: Table tennis
Medal record
Women's table tennis
Representing China
Olympic Games
Silver medal – second place	1996 Atlanta	Doubles
World Championships
Gold medal – first place	1993 Gothenburg	Doubles
Gold medal – first place	1995 Tianjin	Team
Silver medal – second place	1995 Tianjin	Doubles
Bronze medal – third place	1993 Gothenburg	Mixed doubles
Bronze medal – third place	1995 Tianjin	Singles
Bronze medal – third place	1997 Manchester	Doubles
Asian Games
Gold medal – first place	1994 Hiroshima	Doubles
Gold medal – first place	1994 Hiroshima	Team

Qiao Yunping (Chinese: 乔云萍; born 13 September 1968) is a Chinese international table tennis player.

== Table tennis career ==
She won a silver medal in 1996 Atlanta Olympics Games in women's doubles.

Her six World Championship medals included two gold medals; one in the doubles with Liu Wei at the 1993 World Table Tennis Championships and one in the team event at the 1995 World Table Tennis Championships.

== See also ==
- List of table tennis players
- List of World Table Tennis Championships medalists
