= Liu Wei (table tennis) =

Chinese table tennis player

Personal information
- Nationality: China
- Born: October 27, 1969 (age 56)

Sport
- Sport: Table tennis
Medal record
Women's table tennis
Representing China
Olympic Games
Silver medal – second place	1996 Atlanta	Doubles
World Championships
Gold medal – first place	1991 Chiba City	Mixed Doubles
Gold medal – first place	1993 Gothenburg	Doubles
Gold medal – first place	1993 Gothenburg	Mixed Doubles
Gold medal – first place	1995 Tianjin	Mixed Doubles
Gold medal – first place	1995 Tianjin	Team
Silver medal – second place	1995 Tianjin	Doubles
Bronze medal – third place	1989 Dortmund	Doubles
Bronze medal – third place	1991 Chiba City	Doubles
Bronze medal – third place	1995 Tianjin	Singles
World Cup
Gold medal – first place	1991 Barcelona	Team
Gold medal – first place	1995 Atlanta	Team
Asian Championships
Gold medal – first place	1994 Tianjin	Doubles
Gold medal – first place	1994 Tianjin	Team
Silver medal – second place	1990 Kuala Lumpur	Singles
Silver medal – second place	1990 Kuala Lumpur	Doubles
Silver medal – second place	1994 Tianjin	Mixed Doubles
Bronze medal – third place	1994 Tianjin	Singles

Liu Wei (Chinese: 刘伟; born October 27, 1969) is a former female table tennis player from China. From 1989 to 1996 she won several medals in singles, doubles, and team events in the Asian Table Tennis Championships, in the Table Tennis World Cup, and in the World Table Tennis Championships. She also achieved a silver Olympic medal in the double event at Atlanta 1996.

== Hall of Fame ==
She is inducted in the ITTF hall of fame.

== See also ==
- List of table tennis players
- List of World Table Tennis Championships medalists
