= Park Hae-jung (table tennis) =

South Korean table tennis player

Personal information
- Nationality: South Korea
- Born: 29 July 1972 (age 53)

Sport
- Sport: Table tennis
Medal record
Women's table tennis
Representing South Korea
Olympic Games
Bronze medal – third place	1996 Atlanta	Doubles
World Championships
Silver medal – second place	1995 Tianjin	Team
Bronze medal – third place	1993 Gothenburg	Team
Bronze medal – third place	1999 Eindhoven	Doubles
Bronze medal – third place	2000 Kuala Lumpur	Team

Park Hae-Jung (Korean: 박해정; Hanja: 朴海晶; born July 29, 1972 in Iksan, North Jeolla Province, South Korea) is a former female table tennis player from South Korea.

Park is currently serving as a television table tennis commentator, running her own table tennis academy in Ilsan, South Korea.
