= Li Bun-hui =

North Korean table tennis player (born 1968)

Personal information
- Nationality: North Korea
- Born: 29 December 1968 (age 57)

Sport
- Sport: Table tennis
Medal record
Women's table tennis
Representing North Korea
Olympic Games
Bronze medal – third place	1992 Barcelona	Singles
Bronze medal – third place	1992 Barcelona	Doubles
World Championships
Silver medal – second place	1985 Gothenburg	Team
Silver medal – second place	1989 Dortmund	Singles
Silver medal – second place	1993 Gothenburg	Team
Bronze medal – third place	1983 Tokyo	Team
Bronze medal – third place	1987 New Delhi	Doubles
Asian Games
Bronze medal – third place	1990 Beijing	Doubles
Representing Unified Korea
World Championships
Gold medal – first place	1991 Chiba City	Team
Silver medal – second place	1991 Chiba City	Singles
Bronze medal – third place	1991 Chiba City	Mixed doubles

- Li Bun-hui
- Hangul: 리분희
- Hanja: 李粉姬
- RR: Ri Bunhui
- MR: Ri Punhŭi

Li Bun-hui (Korean: 리분희; born December 29, 1968) is a former table tennis player from North Korea who competed in the 1992 Summer Olympics.

== Table tennis career ==
She won eight World Table Tennis Championship medals. She won a bronze medal at the 1983 World Table Tennis Championships in the Corbillon Cup (women's team event).

Two years later she won a silver medal in the women's team and during the 1987 World Table Tennis Championships she won a bronze in the women's doubles with Cho Jung-hui.

Her next medals came in the singles at the 1989 and 1991 and also in 1991 she won a mixed doubles bronze with Kim Song-hui and a gold medal in the team event with Hong Cha-ok, Hyun Jung-hwa and Yu Sun-bok in a unified Korean team. Her final medal was a silver in 1993 in the team event.

== Personal life ==
She is married to Kim Song-hui, also a former table tennis player who represented North Korea, and has a son.

== In popular culture ==
=== Film ===
The story of the Unified Korean team in the 1991 World Championships and its victory over the Chinese in the women's team event is told by the movie As One starring actress Bae Doona as Li Bun-hui.

== See also ==
- List of table tennis players
- List of World Table Tennis Championships medalists
