= Ma Wenge =

Chinese table tennis player

Personal information
- Full name: Ma Wenge
- Nationality: China
- Born: 27 March 1968 (age 58) Tianjin, China

Sport
- Sport: Table tennis
Medal record
Men's table tennis
Representing China
Olympic Games
Bronze medal – third place	1992 Barcelona	Singles
World Championships
Gold medal – first place	1995 Tianjin	Team
Gold medal – first place	1997 Manchester	Team
Silver medal – second place	1989 Dortmund	Team
Silver medal – second place	1993 Gothenburg	Doubles
Silver medal – second place	1993 Gothenburg	Team
Bronze medal – third place	1991 Chiba City	Singles
Bronze medal – third place	1993 Gothenburg	Mixed Doubles
World Cup
Gold medal – first place	1989 Nairobi	Singles
Gold medal – first place	1991 Barcelona	Team
Gold medal – first place	1992 Ho Chi Minh City	Singles
Silver medal – second place	1990 Chiba City	Singles
Silver medal – second place	1990 Hokkaido, Aomori, Niig	Team
Asian Games
Gold medal – first place	1990 Beijing	Singles
Gold medal – first place	1990 Beijing	Doubles
Gold medal – first place	1994 Hiroshima	Team
Bronze medal – third place	1990 Beijing	Team
Asian Championships
Gold medal – first place	1990 Kuala Lumpur	Team
Silver medal – second place	1990 Kuala Lumpur	Singles
Bronze medal – third place	1990 Kuala Lumpur	Mixed Doubles

Ma Wenge (Chinese: 马文革; born March 27, 1968) is a table tennis player from China. He won a bronze medal in 1992 Barcelona Olympics Games in men's single, as well as men's team champion of 1995 and 1997 world table tennis championship (together with Wang Tao, Ding Song, Kong Linghui and Liu Guoliang). He won the Men's singles in the Table Tennis World Cup in 1989 and 1992 and was a silver medalist in 1990.
