= Jörg Roßkopf =

German table tennis player and coach

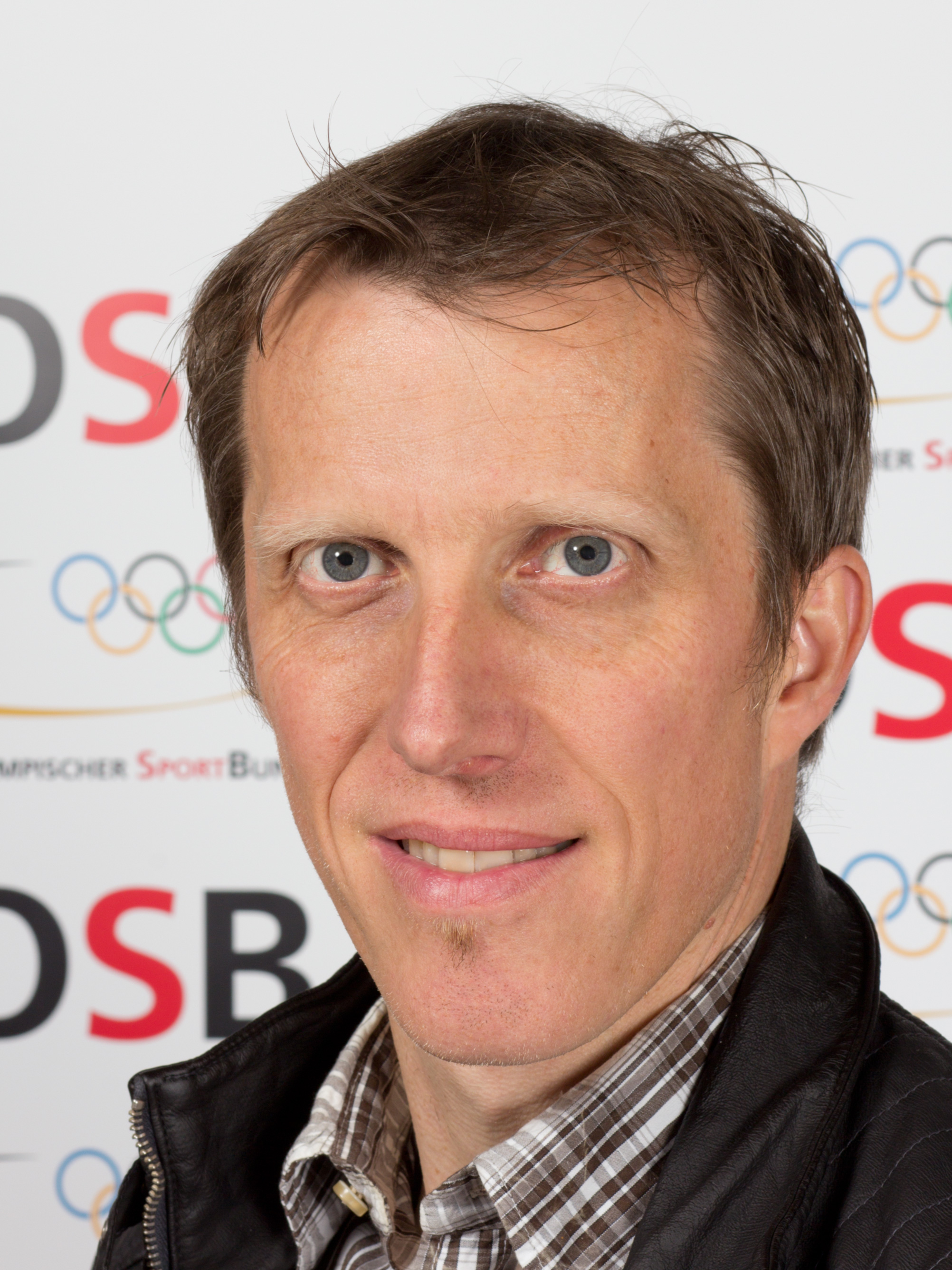
- Jörg Roßkopf 2012

Personal information
- Full name: Jorg Rosskopf
- Nationality: Germany
- Born: 22 May 1969 (age 57) Dieburg, Hessen, West Germany

Sport
- Sport: Table tennis
Medal record
Men's table tennis
Representing West Germany/Germany
Olympic Games
Silver medal – second place	1992 Barcelona	Doubles
Bronze medal – third place	1996 Atlanta	Singles
World Championships
Gold medal – first place	1989 Dortmund	Doubles
Silver medal – second place	2004 Doha	Men's Team
Bronze medal – third place	1993 Gothenburg	Men's Team
Bronze medal – third place	2006 Bremen	Men's Team
World Cup
Gold medal – first place	1998 Shantou	Singles
Silver medal – second place	1995 Nimes	Singles
Bronze medal – third place	2001 Courmayeur	Singles
European Championships

Jörg Roßkopf (born May 22, 1969 in Dieburg, Hesse) is a former professional German table tennis player who is currently the head coach of the German Men's National Table Tennis Team. As a player, he won the title in Men's Doubles at the 1989 World Table Tennis Championships and the silver medal at the 1992 Summer Olympics in Barcelona, with Steffen Fetzner as his partner. In men's singles, he won the bronze medal at the 1996 Summer Olympics in Atlanta and the gold medal at the Table Tennis World Cup in 1998. As a coach, he was awarded the ITTF Star Coach award in 2017.

Jan-Ove Waldner considered him to have the best backhand in the world, particularly against backspin.

He is one of seven table tennis players to have competed in the first five Olympics since the sport was introduced to the Games in 1988. The others are Swede Jörgen Persson, Croatian Zoran Primorac, Belgian Jean-Michel Saive, Hungarian Csilla Bátorfi, Serbian-American Ilija Lupulesku, and Swede Jan-Ove Waldner.

He is sponsored by JOOLA Table Tennis.

== Outstanding career stages ==
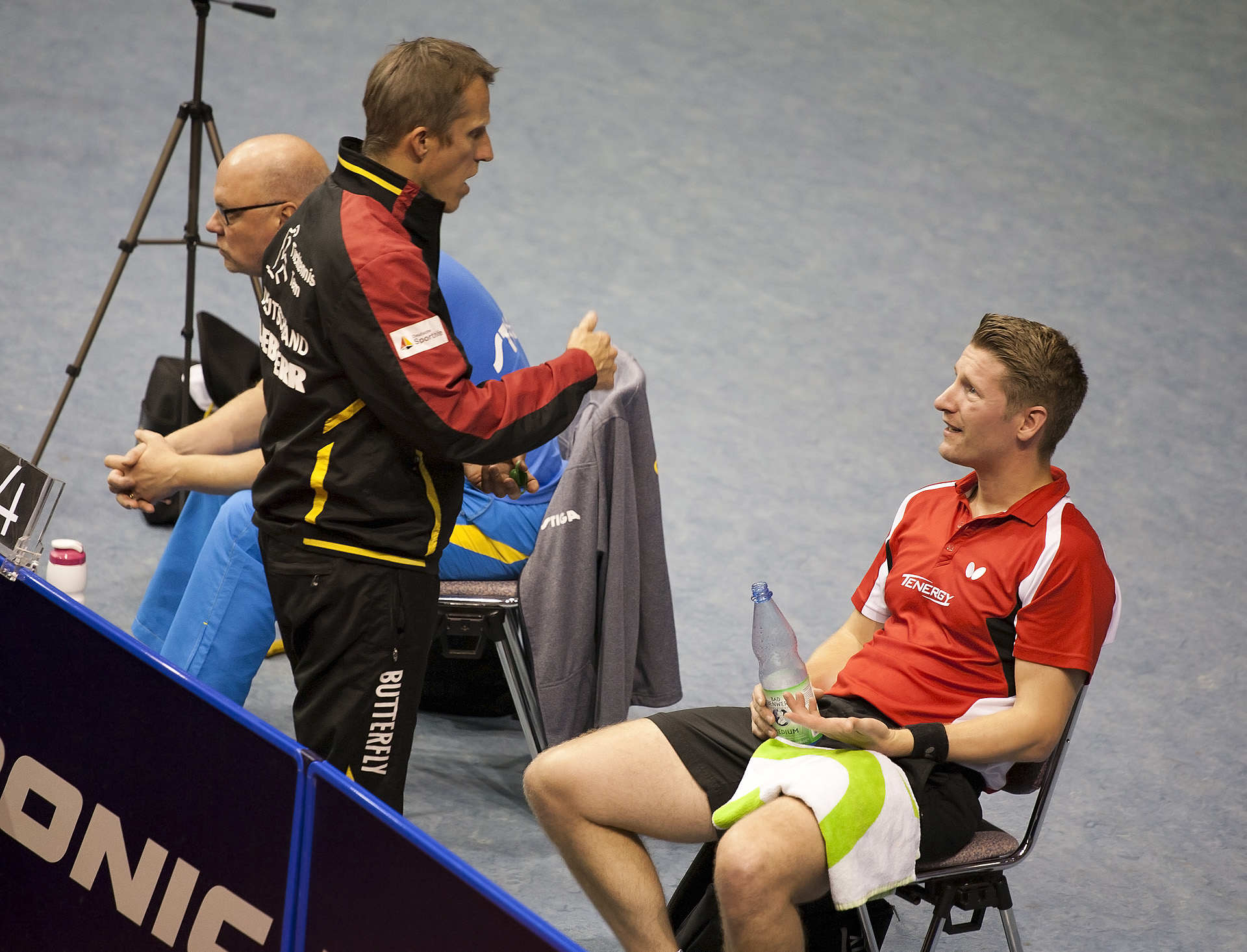
ITTF World Tour 2017 German Open, Jorg Rosskopf as a coach of Ruwen Filus

- 1998 – European Champion doubles Eindhoven
- 1998 – Winner of the World Cup singles Shantou
- 1996 – 3rd singles Olympic Games Atlanta
- 1992 – European Champion singles Stuttgart
- 1992 – 2nd doubles Olympic Games Barcelona
- 1989 – World Champion doubles with Steffen Fetzner Dortmund

== See also ==
- List of athletes with the most appearances at Olympic Games
