= Hong Cha-ok =

South Korean table tennis player (born 1970)

Personal information
- Born: 10 March 1970 (age 56)

Sport
- Sport: Table tennis
Medal record
Women's table tennis
Representing South Korea
Olympic Games
Bronze medal – third place	1992 Barcelona	Doubles
World Championships
Bronze medal – third place	1993 Gothenburg	Team
Asian Games
Gold medal – first place	1990 Beijing	Doubles
Silver medal – second place	1990 Beijing	Team
Bronze medal – third place	1990 Beijing	Mixed doubles
Representing Unified Korea
World Championships
Gold medal – first place	1991 Chiba City	Team

Hong Cha-ok (Korean: 홍차옥; Hanja: 洪次玉; born March 10, 1970) is a former female table tennis player from South Korea who competed in the 1988 Summer Olympics and the 1992 Summer Olympics. She was a member of the Korea Unified team for the 1991 World Table Tennis Championships in Chiba City, Japan.

She was born in Gunwi County, Gyeongsangbuk-do, South Korea.
