= Lü Lin (table tennis) =

Chinese table tennis player (born 1969)

Personal information
- Nationality: China
- Born: 6 April 1969 (age 57)

Sport
- Sport: Table tennis
Medal record
Representing China
Men's Table tennis
Olympic Games
| Gold medal – first place | 1992 Barcelona | Doubles |
| Silver medal – second place | 1996 Atlanta | Doubles |

Lü Lin (Chinese: 吕林; born April 6, 1969, in Wenling) is a Chinese table tennis player and Olympic champion. He uses a pen-grip topspin style, and is best known for the combination of him and Wang Tao in men's doubles championships.

He won a gold medal in men's doubles at the 1992 Summer Olympics in Barcelona with Wang Tao.

They took part in the 1996 Summer Olympics in Atlanta again, where they won a silver medal.

The combo also won the men's doubles title at 1993 and 1995 World Table Tennis Championships.

Lü Lin's son, Lü Xiang (born 1996), is also a table tennis player. He won the Men's Doubles title at the 2014 German Open.
