= Liu Guoliang =

Chinese table tennis player

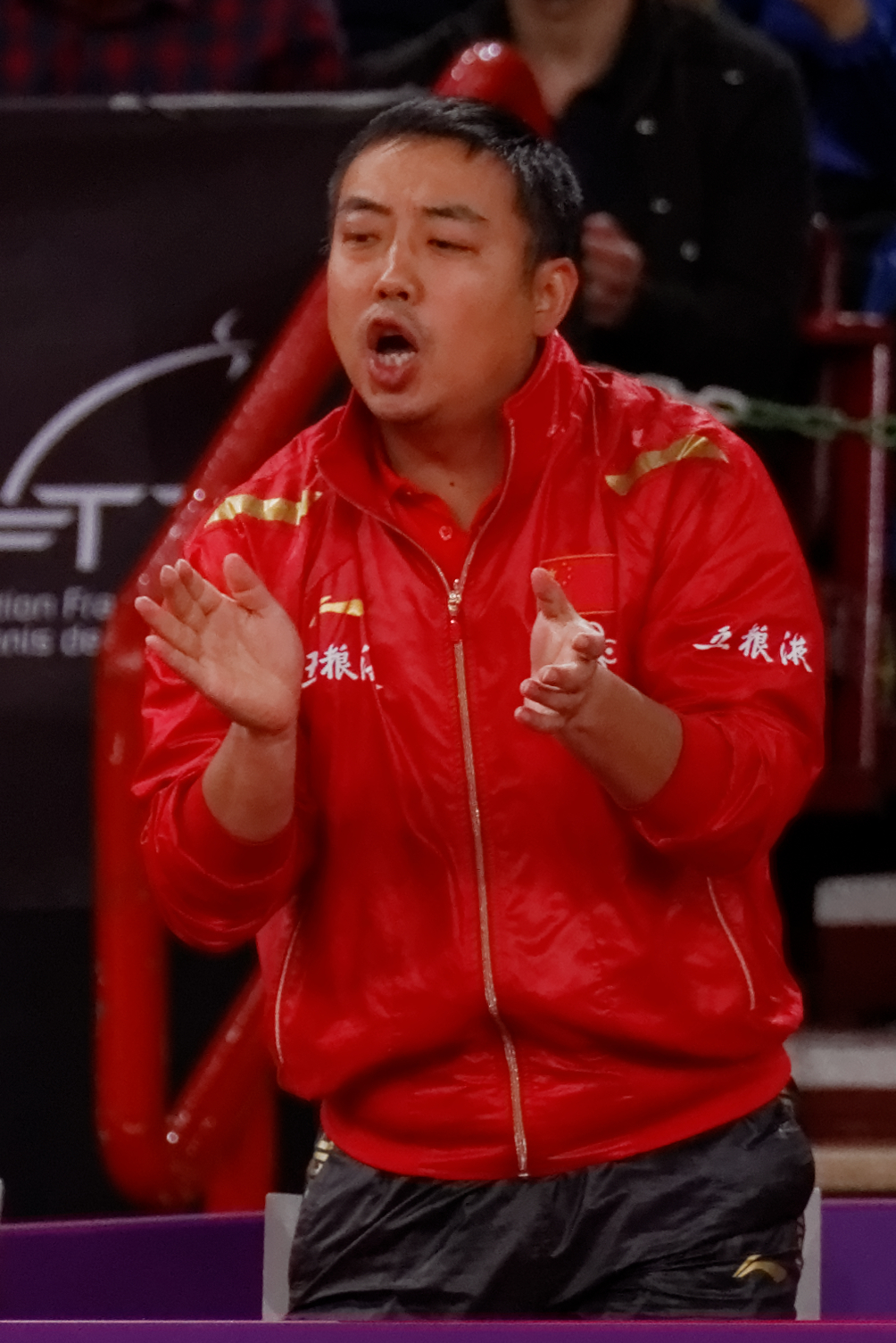
- Liu Guoliang at the 2013 World Table Tennis Championships – Men's Singles

Personal information
- Full name: Liu Guoliang
- Nickname: Legend Liu
- Nationality: Chinese
- Born: 10 January 1976 (age 50) Xinxiang, Henan, China

Sport
- Sport: Table tennis
Medal record
Men's table tennis
Representing China
Olympic Games
Gold medal – first place	1996 Atlanta	Singles
Gold medal – first place	1996 Atlanta	Doubles
Silver medal – second place	2000 Sydney	Doubles
Bronze medal – third place	2000 Sydney	Singles
World Championships
Gold medal – first place	1995 Tianjin	Team
Gold medal – first place	1997 Manchester	Doubles
Gold medal – first place	1997 Manchester	Mixed Doubles
Gold medal – first place	1997 Manchester	Team
Gold medal – first place	1999 Eindhoven	Singles
Gold medal – first place	1999 Eindhoven	Doubles
Gold medal – first place	2001 Osaka	Team
Silver medal – second place	1993 Gothenburg	Team
Silver medal – second place	1995 Tianjin	Singles
Silver medal – second place	2000 Kuala Lumpur	Team
Silver medal – second place	2001 Osaka	Doubles
Bronze medal – third place	1993 Gothenburg	Doubles
Bronze medal – third place	1995 Tianjin	Doubles
Bronze medal – third place	2001 Osaka	Mixed Doubles
World Cup
Gold medal – first place	1996 Nimes	Singles
Bronze medal – third place	1995 Nimes	Singles

Liu Guoliang (simplified Chinese: 刘国梁; traditional Chinese: 劉國梁; pinyin: Liú Guóliáng; born January 10, 1976) is a retired Chinese table tennis player. He is the first Chinese male player to achieve a career grand slam of three majors (Olympic Games, World Cup, World Championships). He is considered by many to be one of the greatest players and coaches of all time. He has also played with Kong Linghui in doubles.

== Biography ==
Liu Guoliang was born in Xinxiang, Henan. He won two gold medals in the 1996 Summer Olympics, the men's singles and the men's doubles (with Kong Linghui), he won the men's singles in the 1996 World Cup, the World Doubles Championships in 1997 and 1999 with doubles partner Kong Linghui, and the 1999 World Singles Championships in Eindhoven. He was a member of the winning Chinese team in both the 1995 and 1997 World Table Tennis Team Championships.

Liu retired after the 2001 season and was appointed as the head coach of China's National Men's Team at the age of 27. As the head coach of the Chinese Men's National Table Tennis Team he is the most successful coach in history with a team gold medal at the 2008 Summer Olympics in addition to the medal sweep by Ma Lin, Wang Hao, and Wang Liqin. At the 2012 Summer Olympics the team won gold and Zhang Jike and Wang Hao won gold and silver medals respectively in the men's singles. At the 2016 Summer Olympics the team again won gold and Ma Long and Zhang Jike won the gold and silver medals in the men's singles.

The Chinese team has also won every men's singles teams championships in the World Table Tennis Championships since Liu became head coach; a period spanning from 2001 to 2018.

On December 1, 2018, Liu was elected as president of the Chinese Table Tennis Association, replacing Cai Zhenhua.

=== 2021 ===
In June, Liu stated that unlike in previous Olympic games, he did not want to place pressure on the Chinese players and coaches to sweep all the gold medals at the Tokyo Olympics.

=== ITTF and WTT Leadership ===
Liu Guoliang was selected to the ITTF Executive Committee in 2021. He was appointed as ITTF Deputy President and WTT board chairman in October 2022. On April 23, 2025, he resigned as CTTA president, with Wang Liqin being his successor.

== Equipment ==
His playing style is based on the use of short pimple-out rubber and he uses a penholder grip. He is the forerunner of the backhand reverse topspin. His blade is Stiga Clipper, his forehand rubber is Stiga Clippa and his reverse backhand rubber is Stiga Mendo Energy.

During his prime (1996–1999) Liu played with TSP Spinpips on his forehand and Mark V on his backhand, yet still on the Stiga Clipper blade. The Spinpip rubbers was banned in the late 2000 and their counterpart Spinpip Md the year after. Both times because of the aspect ratio (ratio of pips height to width) and its structure of the pip and the arrangement of the pips that made the rubber extremely spinny and unpredictable; and therefore judged to be too advantageous. It is therefore uncertain if Liu actually ever played with Stiga rubbers in competition.

== Family ==
Liu Guoliang's older brother, Liu Guodong, was the head coach of the Indonesia table tennis national team.

Sporting positions
Previous: Cai Zhenhua	President of the Chinese Table Tennis Association; 2018	Incumbent
