= Steffen Fetzner =

German table tennis player

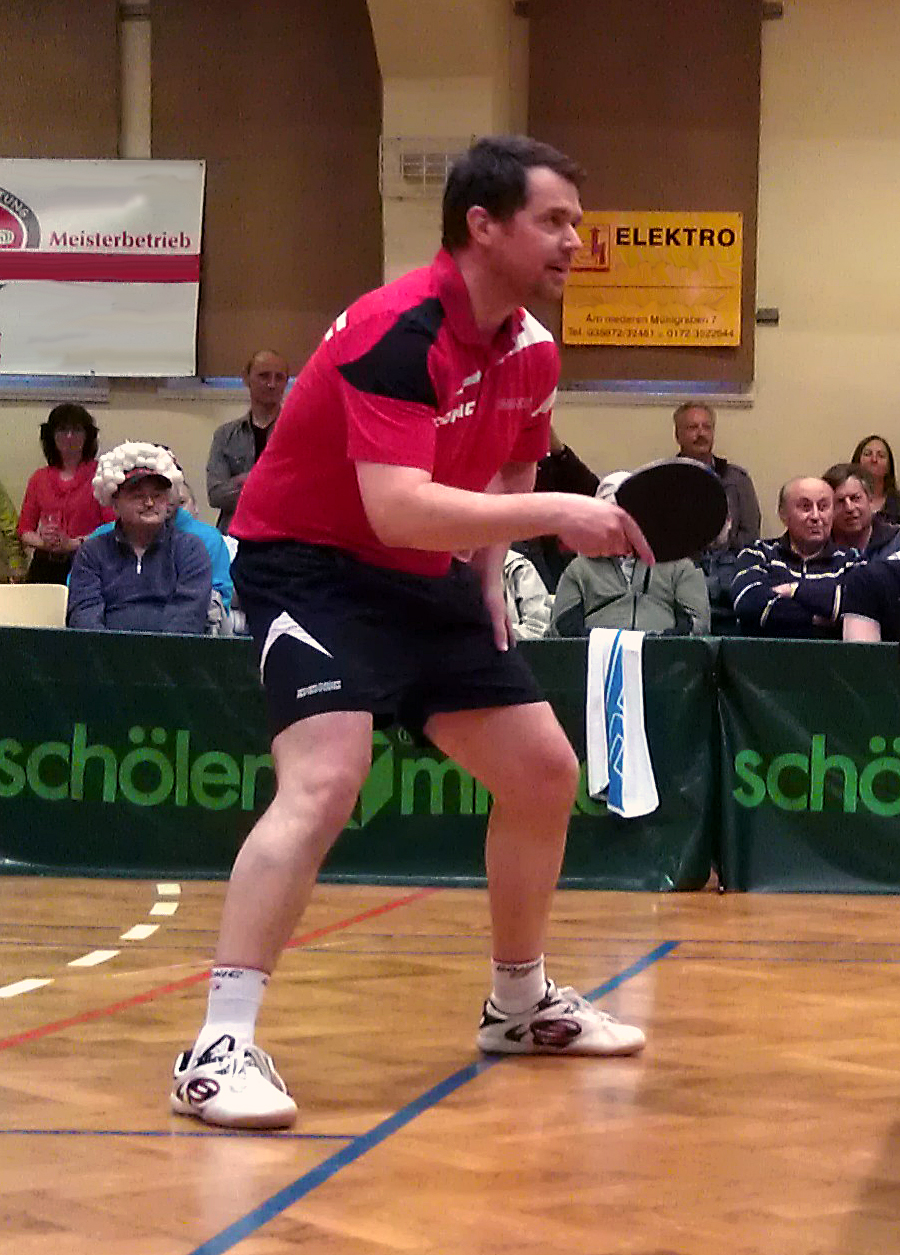

Personal information
- Full name: Steffen Fetzner
- Nationality: Germany
- Born: 17 August 1968 (age 57) Karlsruhe, West Germany

Sport
- Sport: Table tennis
Medal record
Men's table tennis
Representing West Germany
World Championships
Gold medal – first place	1989 Dortmund	Doubles
World Cup
Silver medal – second place	1990 Seoul	Doubles
Bronze medal – third place	1990 Las Vegas	Doubles
Representing Germany
Olympic Games
Silver medal – second place	1992 Barcelona	Doubles
World Championships
Bronze medal – third place	1993 Gothenburg	Men's Team
World Cup
Silver medal – second place	1995 Atlanta	Men's Team
European Championships
Silver medal – second place	2000 Bremen	Men's Team
Bronze medal – third place	1994 Birmingham	Doubles
Bronze medal – third place	1996 Bratislava	Doubles

Steffen Fetzner is a male former table tennis player from Germany. From 1989 to 2000 he won several medals in doubles, and team events in the Table Tennis European Championships, in the World Table Tennis Championships, and in the Table Tennis World Cup. He also won a silver medal in the Olympic Games at Barcelona 1992.

== Career ==
Fetzner represented Germany a total of 206 times during his playing career. He took part in three Olympic Games and seven World and European Championships.

After retirement, he took up a head coach role at Aspire Academy in May 2007.
