= Yu Sun-bok =

North Korean table tennis player

Personal information
- Nationality: North Korea
- Born: 2 August 1970 (age 55)

Sport
- Sport: Table tennis
Medal record
Women's table tennis
Representing North Korea
Olympic Games
Bronze medal – third place	1992 Barcelona	Doubles
World Championships
Silver medal – second place	1993 Gothenburg	Team
Bronze medal – third place	1993 Gothenburg	Mixed doubles
Asian Games
Bronze medal – third place	1990 Beijing	Doubles
Representing Unified Korea
World Championships
Gold medal – first place	1991 Chiba City	Team

- Yu Sun-bok
- Hangul: 유순복
- RR: Yu Sunbok
- MR: Yu Sunbok

Yu Sun-bok (Korean: 유순복; born August 2, 1970) is a former table tennis player from North Korea who competed in the 1992 Summer Olympics.
