= Wang Tao (table tennis) =

Chinese table tennis player

Personal information
- Native name: 王涛
- Nationality: China
- Born: 13 December 1967 (age 58) Beijing, China

Sport
- Sport: Table tennis
Medal record
Men's table tennis
Representing China
Olympic Games
Gold medal – first place	1992 Barcelona	Doubles
Silver medal – second place	1996 Atlanta	Singles
Silver medal – second place	1996 Atlanta	Doubles
World Table Tennis Championships
Gold medal – first place	1991 Chiba City	Mixed Doubles
Gold medal – first place	1993 Gothenburg	Doubles
Gold medal – first place	1993 Gothenburg	Mixed Doubles
Gold medal – first place	1995 Tianjin	Doubles
Gold medal – first place	1995 Tianjin	Mixed Doubles
Gold medal – first place	1995 Tianjin	Team
Gold medal – first place	1997 Manchester	Team
Silver medal – second place	1991 Chiba City	Doubles
Silver medal – second place	1993 Gothenburg	Team
Bronze medal – third place	1995 Tianjin	Singles
Table Tennis World Cup
Gold medal – first place	1991 Barcelona	Team
Silver medal – second place	1993 Guangzhou	Singles

Wang Tao (Chinese: 王涛; born December 13, 1967, in Beijing) is a retired Chinese table tennis player, the current head coach of the Bayi Gongshang club in the China Table Tennis Super League, and a member of the Chinese Olympic Committee. Wang Tao is a left-handed player who utilizes the Shakehand grip, known for using short pimpled rubber on his backhand and regular inverted rubber on his forehand. Due to the special characteristics of short pimpled rubber being able to hit through and resist spin, Wang Tao's play style is unique, as he was able to rely on the quick hitting motion on his backhand to directly attack serves with heavy spin or make controlled shots at wide angles against his opponents. Wang Tao positions himself close to the table, attacking with great speed and surprising his opponents with unexpected shots.

Wang Tao was an influential figure, making great contributions to the revival of Chinese dominance in the sport of table tennis in a time when European countries like Sweden and Austria dominated the world stage (winning the men's team event during the 1995 table tennis world championships).

Wang Tao was mentioned in season 4, episode 8 of the American television series The Office. In the episode, entitled "The Deposition", the character Dwight Schrute mentions Wang Tao as one of his table tennis heroes.
