= China at the 1996 Summer Olympics =

- IOC code: CHN
- NOC: Chinese Olympic Committee
- Website: www.olympic.cn (in Chinese and English)

in Atlanta
- Competitors: 294 (111 men and 183 women) in 25 sports
- Flag bearer: Liu Yudong
- Medals Ranked 4th: Gold 16 Silver 22 Bronze 12 Total 50

Summer Olympics appearances (overview)
- 1952; 1956–1980; 1984; 1988; 1992; 1996; 2000; 2004; 2008; 2012; 2016; 2020; 2024; 2028

Other related appearances
- Republic of China (1924–1948)

The People's Republic of China competed at the 1996 Summer Olympics in Atlanta, United States. 294 competitors, 111 men and 183 women, took part in 155 events in 25 sports. The Chinese swim team reportedly had widespread doping throughout the 1990s.

== Medalists ==
Medals by sport
Sport	1st place, gold medalist(s)	2nd place, silver medalist(s)	3rd place, bronze medalist(s)	Total
Table Tennis	4	3	1	8
Diving	3	1	1	5
Shooting	2	2	1	5
Weightlifting	2	1	1	4
Gymnastics	1	4	1	6
Swimming	1	3	2	6
Athletics	1	2	1	4
Badminton	1	1	2	4
Judo	1	0	1	2
Archery	0	1	0	1
Football	0	1	0	1
Rowing	0	1	0	1
Softball	0	1	0	1
Volleyball	0	1	0	1
Wrestling	0	0	1	1
Total	16	22	12	50

Medal	Name	Sport	Event	Date
Gold	Sun Fuming	Judo	Women's +72 kg	20 July
Gold	Le Jingyi	Swimming	Women's 100 metre freestyle	20 July
Gold	Tang Lingsheng	Weightlifting	Men's –59 kg	21 July
Gold	Zhan Xugang	Weightlifting	Men's –70 kg	23 July
Gold	Li Xiaoshuang	Gymnastics	Men's artistic individual all-around	24 July
Gold	Li Duihong	Shooting	Women's 25 metre pistol	26 July
Gold	Yang Ling	Shooting	Men's 10 metre running target	26 July
Gold	Fu Mingxia	Diving	Women's 10 metre platform	27 July
Gold	Wang Junxia	Athletics	Women's 5000 metres	28 July
Gold	Deng Yaping; Qiao Hong	Table tennis	Women's doubles	29 July
Gold	Xiong Ni	Diving	Men's 3 metre springboard	29 July
Gold	Kong Linghui; Liu Guoliang	Table tennis	Men's doubles	30 July
Gold	Ge Fei; Gu Jun	Badminton	Women's doubles	31 July
Gold	Deng Yaping	Table tennis	Women's singles	31 July
Gold	Fu Mingxia	Diving	Women's 3 metre springboard	31 July
Gold	Liu Guoliang	Table tennis	Men's singles	1 August
Silver	Wang Yifu	Shooting	Men's 10 metre air pistol	20 July
Silver	Zhang Xiangsen	Weightlifting	Men's –54 kg	20 July
Silver	Li Xiaoshuang; Zhang Jinjing; Shen Jian; Fan Bin; Huang Huadong; Huang Liping; Fan Hongbin	Gymnastics	Men's artistic team all-around	22 July
Silver	Le Jingyi; Chao Na; Nian Yun; Shan Ying	Swimming	Women's 4 × 100 metre freestyle relay	22 July
Silver	Liu Limin	Swimming	Women's 100 metre butterfly	23 July
Silver	Xiao Jun	Shooting	Men's 10 metre running target	26 July
Silver	Le Jingyi	Swimming	Women's 50 metre freestyle	26 July
Silver	Cao Mianying; Zhang Xiuyun	Rowing	Women's double sculls	27 July
Silver	Li Xiaoshuang	Gymnastics	Men's floor	28 July
Silver	Liu Wei; Qiao Yunping	Table tennis	Women's doubles	29 July
Silver	Mo Huilan	Gymnastics	Women's vault	29 July
Silver	Bi Wenjing	Gymnastics	Women's uneven bars	29 July
Silver	Yu Zhuocheng	Diving	Men's 3 metre springboard	29 July
Silver	Lu Lin; Wang Tao	Table tennis	Men's doubles	30 July
Silver	China women's national softball team: An Zhongxin; Chen Hong; He Liping; Lei Li; Liu Xuqing; Liu Yaju; Ma Ying; Ou JIngbai; Tao Hua; Wang Lihong; Wang Ying; Wei Qiang; Xu Jian; Yan Fang; Zhang Chunfang	Softball	Women's tournament	30 July
Silver	He Ying	Archery	Women's individual	31 July
Silver	Dong Jiong	Badminton	Men's singles	1 August
Silver	Wang Tao	Table tennis	Men's singles	1 August
Silver	China women's national football team: Wang Liping; Fan Yunjie; Yu Hongqi; Chen Yufeng; Wei Haiying; Zhao Lihong; Shi Guihong; Shui Qingxia; Sun Wen; Xie Huilin; Wen Lirong; Gao Hong; Sun Qingmei; Liu Ying; Liu Ailing	Football	Women's tournament	1 August
Silver	Sui Xinmei	Athletics	Women's shot put	2 August
Silver	Wang Junxia	Athletics	Women's 10,000 metres	2 August
Silver	China women's national volleyball team: Lai Yawen; Li Yan; Cui Yongmei; Wu Yongmei; Wang Yi; He Qi; Wang Ziling; Sun Yue; Wang Lina	Volleyball	Women's tournament	3 August
Bronze	Sheng Zetian	Wrestling	Men's Greco-Roman –57 kg	21 July
Bronze	Wang Xianbo	Judo	Women's –66 kg	22 July
Bronze	Xiao Jiangang	Weightlifting	Men's –64 kg	22 July
Bronze	Zhang Bing	Shooting	Men's double trap	24 July
Bronze	Lin Li	Swimming	Women's 200 metre individual medley	24 July
Bronze	Chen Yan; Han Xue; Cai Huijue; Shan Ying	Swimming	Women's 4 × 100 metre medley relay	24 July
Bronze	Wang Yan	Athletics	Women's 10 kilometres walk	29 July
Bronze	Fan Bin	Gymnastics	Men's horizontal bar	29 July
Bronze	Qin Yiyuan; Tang Yongshu	Badminton	Women's doubles	30 July
Bronze	Qiao Hong	Table tennis	Women's singles	31 July
Bronze	Sun Man; Liu Jianjun	Badminton	Mixed doubles	31 July
Bronze	Xiao Hailiang	Diving	Men's 10 metre platform	2 August

== Competitors ==
The following is the list of number of competitors in the Games.

Sport	Men	Women	Total
Archery	3	3	6
Athletics	14	17	31
Badminton	9	11	20
Basketball	12	12	24
Boxing	3	–	3
Canoeing	2	6	8
Cycling	0	5	5
Diving	4	3	7
Fencing	5	4	9
Football	0	15	15
Gymnastics	7	14	21
Handball	0	12	12
Judo	4	7	11
Rowing	4	9	13
Sailing	2	3	5
Shooting	16	8	24
Softball	–	15	15
Swimming	5	16	21
Synchronized swimming	–	8	8
Table tennis	4	4	8
Tennis	2	2	4
Volleyball	0	9	9
Weightlifting	10	–	10
Wrestling	5	–	5
Total	111	183	294

== Archery ==
The People's Republic of China sent three men and three women to Atlanta for archery. As usual, the Chinese women were the more successful squad, with He Ying winning a silver medal. They went a combined 9–3 in individual competition as opposed the men's 1–3 record. They also won their first team match before being defeated.

Men

Athlete	Event	Ranking round		Round of 64	Round of 32	Round of 16	Quarterfinals	Semifinals	Final / BM	
Athlete	Event	Score	Seed	Opposition Score	Opposition Score	Opposition Score	Opposition Score	Opposition Score	Opposition Score	Rank
Luo Hengyu	Individual	627	58	Petersson (SWE); L 161–167	Did not advance					
Shen Jun	Individual	644	47	Gray (AUS); L 158–162	Did not advance					
Tang Hua	Individual	664	14	Podlazov (RUS); W 157–154	Grov (NOR); L 159–161	Did not advance				
Luo Hengyu; Shen Jun; Tang Hua	Team	1935	13	—N/a		Australia; L 240–243	Did not advance			

Women

Athlete	Event	Ranking round		Round of 64	Round of 32	Round of 16	Quarterfinals	Semifinals	Final / BM	
Athlete	Event	Score	Seed	Opposition Score	Opposition Score	Opposition Score	Opposition Score	Opposition Score	Opposition Score	Rank
He Ying	Individual	669	2	Reyes (PUR); W 158–123	Hess (NOR); W 163–163	Williamson (GBR); W 165–159	Mensing (GER); W 103–93	Altınkaynak (TUR); W 101–100	Kim (KOR); L 107–113	2nd place, silver medalist(s)
Wang Xiaozhu	Individual	636	32	Fantato (ITA); W 152–143	Herasymenko (UKR); W 156–152	Dykman (USA); W 156–149	Kim (KOR); L 103–106	Did not advance		
Yang Jianping	Individual	648	16	Matthews (AUS); W 159–150	Dykman (USA); L 148–154	Did not advance				
He Ying; Wang Xiaozhu; Yang Jianping	Team	1953	3	—N/a		Japan; W 222–217	Germany; L 231–232	Did not advance		

== Athletics ==
Men
Track and road events

Athlete	Event	Heats		Quarterfinal		Semifinal		Final	
Athlete	Event	Result	Rank	Result	Rank	Result	Rank	Result	Rank
Chen Wenzhong	100 metres	10.37	33 Q	10.29	23	Did not advance			
Chen Wenzhong	200 metres	21.05	55	Did not advance					
Chen Yanhao	110 metres hurdles	13.76	33	Did not advance					
Li Tong	110 metres hurdles	13.57	13 Q	13.43	9 Q	13.60	15	Did not advance	
Li Mingcai	20 kilometres walk	—N/a						DQ	
Li Zewen	20 kilometres walk	—N/a						1:25:28	27
Yu Guohui	20 kilometres walk	—N/a						1:24:30	20
Mao Xinyuan	50 kilometres walk	—N/a						DQ	
Zhang Huiqiang	50 kilometres walk	—N/a						3:53:10	14
Zhao Yongsheng	50 kilometres walk	—N/a						DQ	

Field events

Athlete	Event	Qualification		Final	
Athlete	Event	Distance	Position	Distance	Position
Chen Jing	Long jump	7.70	29	Did not advance	
Huang Geng	Long jump	8.12	6 Q	7.99	9
Zou Sixin	Triple jump	16.53	21	Did not advance	
Li Shaojie	Discus throw	60.20	18	Did not advance	
Zhang Lianbiao	Javelin throw	79.88	12 q	80.96	11

Women
Track and road events

Athlete	Event	Heats		Quarterfinal		Semifinal		Final	
Athlete	Event	Result	Rank	Result	Rank	Result	Rank	Result	Rank
Yan Jiankui	100 metres	11.46	33	Did not advance					
Du Xiujie	200 metres	23.69	38	Did not advance					
Yan Jiankui	200 metres	23.21	23 q	23.30	22	Did not advance			
Du Xiujie	400 metres	53.95	41	Did not advance					
Zhang Jian	800 metres	2:04.17	27	—N/a		Did not advance			
Wang Junxia	5000 metres	15:24.28	13 Q	—N/a				14:59.88 OR	1st place, gold medalist(s)
Wei Li	5000 metres	15:33.49	17	—N/a				Did not advance	
Yang Siju	5000 metres	15:40.41	20	—N/a				Did not advance	
Wang Junxia	10,000 metres	32:36.53	19 Q	—N/a				31:02.58	2nd place, silver medalist(s)
Wang Mingxia	10,000 metres	32:10.26	10 q	—N/a				32:38.98	15
Yang Siju	10,000 metres	32:22.27	13 q	—N/a				33:15.29	19
Ren Xiujuan	Marathon	—N/a						2:31:21	9
Gao Hongmiao	10 kilometres walk	—N/a						DQ	
Gu Yan	10 kilometres walk	—N/a						42:34	4
Wang Yan	10 kilometres walk	—N/a						42:19	3rd place, bronze medalist(s)

Field events

Athlete	Event	Qualification		Final	
Athlete	Event	Distance	Position	Distance	Position
Ren Ruiping	Triple jump	14.56	4 Q	14.30	6
Wang Xiangrong	Triple jump	13.32	22	Did not advance	
Li Meisu	Shot put	18.39	14	Did not advance	
Sui Xinmei	Shot put	19.36	2 Q	19.88	2nd place, silver medalist(s)
Xiao Yanling	Discus throw	65.10	2 Q	64.72	5
Li Lei	Javelin throw	61.48	7 q	60.74	8

== Badminton ==
Men

Athlete	Event	Round of 64	Round of 32	Round of 16	Quarterfinals	Semifinals	Final	
Athlete	Event	Opposition Result	Opposition Result	Opposition Result	Opposition Result	Opposition Result	Opposition Result	Rank
Dong Jiong	Singles	Bye	van Soerland (NED); W 15–9, 15–4	Stuer-Lauridsen (DEN); W 15–6, 18–15	Park (KOR); W 15–6, 15–6	Sidek (MAS); W 15–6, 18–16	Høyer Larsen (DEN); L 12–15, 10–15	2nd place, silver medalist(s)
Sun Jun	Singles	Thobois (FRA); W 15–5, 15–6	Kim (KOR); W 15–5, 17–4	Budikusuma (INA); L 5–15, 6–15	Did not advance			
Yu Lizhi	Singles	Pongratz (GER); W 15–5, 12–15, 15–1	Dawson (CAN); W 15–10, 15–11	Sidek (MAS); L 5–15, 2–15	Did not advance			
Ge Cheng; Tao Xiaoqiang	Doubles	—N/a	Hall / Knowles (GBR); W 15–2, 15–3	Cheah / Yap (MAS); L 8–15, 2–15	Did not advance			
Huang Zhanzhong; Jiang Xin	Doubles	—N/a	Bye	Blackburn / Staight (AUS); W 15–7, 15–9	Mainaky / Subagja (INA); L 7–15, 7–15	Did not advance		

Women

Athlete	Event	Round of 64	Round of 32	Round of 16	Quarterfinals	Semifinals	Final	
Athlete	Event	Opposition Result	Opposition Result	Opposition Result	Opposition Result	Opposition Result	Opposition Result	Rank
Han Jingna	Singles	Bye	Ódor (HUN); W 11–0, 11–1	Plungwech (THA); W 11–3, 11–6	Susanti (INA); L 11–3, 4–11, 8–11	Did not advance		
Yao Yan	Singles	Bye	Yakusheva (RUS); W 11–4, 11–4	Santosa (INA); W 11–6, 11–5	Bang (KOR); L 3–11, 2–11	Did not advance		
Ye Zhaoying	Singles	Bye	Chan (MAS); W 11–4, 11–1	Borg (SWE); W 11–4, 11–4	Kim (KOR); L 5–11, 11–12	Did not advance		
Chen Ying; Peng Xingyong	Doubles	—N/a	Evtoushenko / Nozdran (UKR); W 15–2, 11–15, 15–1	Coene / van den Heuvel (NED); W 15–8, 15–13	Kirkegaard / Olsen (DEN); L 6–15, 15–8, 5–15	Did not advance		
Ge Fei; Gu Jun	Doubles	—N/a	Bye	Schmidt / Ubben (GER) 'W 15–3, 15–6	Nathanael / Resiana (INA); W 15–7, 15–3	Kirkegaard / Olsen (DEN); W 15–8, 15–2	Gil / Jang (KOR); W 15–5, 15–5	1st place, gold medalist(s)
Qin Yiyuan; Tang Yongshu	Doubles	—N/a	Bye	Finarsih / Tampi (INA); W 15–1, 4–15, 15–6	Stuer-Lauridsen / Thomsen (DEN); W 15–8, 15–3	Gil / Jang (KOR); L 12–15, 15–10, 16–18	Kirkegaard / Olsen (DEN); W 7–15, 15–4, 15–8	3rd place, bronze medalist(s)

Mixed

Athlete	Event	Round of 32	Round of 16	Quarterfinals	Semifinals	Final	
Athlete	Event	Opposition Result	Opposition Result	Opposition Result	Opposition Result	Opposition Result	Rank
Peng Xingyong; Chen Xingdong	Doubles	Wibowo / Wapp (SUI); W 15–5, 15–2	Julien / Yung (CAN); W 15–11, 15–6	Olsen / Søgaard (DEN); W 15–10, 6–15, 18–15	Gil / Kim (KOR); L 6–15, 8–15	Sun / Liu (CHN); L 15–13, 15–17, 4–15	4
Sun Man; Liu Jianjun	Doubles	Deng / Kaul (CAN); W 15–12, 15–3	Cator / Blackburn (AUS); W 15–4, 7–15, 15–4	Riseu / Limpele (INA); W 15–2, 5–15, 15–7	Ra / Park (KOR); L 10–15, 4–15	Peng / Chen (CHN); W 13–15, 17–15, 15–4	3rd place, bronze medalist(s)
Wang Xiaoyuan; Tao Xiaoqiang	Doubles	Campbell / Hocking (AUS); W 15–5, 15–4	Olsen / Jakobsen (DEN); W 16–17, 15–6, 15–5	Ra / Park (KOR); L 7–15, 9–15	Did not advance		

== Basketball ==
Summary

Team	Event	Group stage						Quarterfinal	Semifinal	Final	
Team	Event	Opposition Result	Opposition Result	Opposition Result	Opposition Result	Opposition Result	Rank	Opposition Result	Opposition Result	Opposition Result	Rank
China men's	Men's tournament	Angola; W 70–67	Croatia; L 78–109	Argentina; W 87–77	United States; L 70–133	Lithuania; L 55–116	4 Q	FR Yugoslavia; L 61–128	Greece; L 75–115	Croatia; L 85–99	8
China women's	Women's tournament	Italy; L 56–69	Japan; L 72–75	Canada; W 61–49	Brazil; L 83–98	Russia; L 78–94	5	—N/a	Zaire; W 91–67	South Korea; W 85–71	9

=== Men's tournament ===
Team roster

- Mengke Bateer
- Gong Xiaobin
- Hu Weidong
- Li Nan
- Li Xiaoyong
- Liu Yudong
- Shan Tao
- Sun Jun
- Wang Zhizhi
- Wu Naiqun
- Wu Qinglong
- Zheng Wu

Preliminary round

Pos	Team	Pld	W	L	PF	PA	PD	Pts	Qualification
1	United States (H)	5	5	0	522	345	+177	10	Quarterfinals
2	Lithuania	5	3	2	427	354	+73	8 (Note: Head-to-head record: Lithuania 1–0 Croatia)	Quarterfinals
3	Croatia	5	3	2	422	386	+36	8	Quarterfinals
4	China	5	2	3	360	502	−142	7 (Note: Head-to-head record: China 1–0 Argentina)	Quarterfinals
5	Argentina	5	2	3	351	396	−45	7	9th place playoff
6	Angola	5	0	5	280	379	−99	5	11th place playoff

Source: FIBA archive
Rules for classification: 1) points; 2) head-to-head points; 3) head-to-head goal average; 4) head-to-head number of points scored.
(H) Hosts
Notes:

20 July 1996

Report

China	70–67	Angola
Scoring by half: 36–36, 34–31
Pts: Wang 17; Rebs: Wang 11; Asts: Hu 3		Pts: Â. Victoriano, Carvalho 13; Rebs: Â. Victoriano 6 Asts: Avô 5

Atlanta
Referees: Jose Piovesan Neto (BRA), Juan Brea Diaz (CUB)

22 July 1996

Report

Croatia	109–78	China
Scoring by half: 56–44, 53–34
Pts: Komazec 36; Rebs: Vranković 9 Asts: Kukoč 12		Pts: Wang, Zheng 15; Rebs: Gong 8 Asts: Sun 6

Atlanta
Referees: Jose Pelissari (BRA), Kim Chul-Hwan (KOR)

24 July 1996

Report

China	87–77	Argentina
Scoring by half: 51–38, 36–39
Pts: Zheng, Hu 22; Rebs: Zheng 9 Asts: Li 5		Pts: Espil 25; Rebs: Pérez 7 Asts: Milanesio 8

Atlanta
Referees: Robert Barnett (AUS), Roman Ryzhyk (UKR)

26 July 1996

Report

United States	133–70	China
Scoring by half: 65–28, 68–42
Pts: Pippen 24; Rebs: O'Neal 10; Asts: Hardaway 10		Pts: Liu 18; Rebs: Bateer 6 Asts: Li 5

Atlanta
Referees: Donald Cline (CAN), Hidetoshi Ishida (JPN)

28 July 1996

Report

China	55–116	Lithuania
Scoring by half: 23–53, 32–63
Pts: Wang 18; Rebs: Wang 5 Asts: Li 4		Pts: Štombergas 19; Rebs: Einikis 9 Asts: Marčiulionis 7

Atlanta
Referees: Jose Reyes Ronfini (MEX), Juan Figueroa (PUR)

Quarterfinals

30 July 1996
12:00

Report

FR Yugoslavia	128–61	China
Scoring by half: 63–29, 65–32
Pts: Rebrača 22; Rebs: Topić 8 Asts: Berić, Đorđević 6		Pts: Wang 13; Rebs: Wang, Wu 4 Asts: Li 3

Atlanta
Referees: Hidetoshi Ishida (JPN), Gennaro Colucci ITA

Classification Round 5–8th Place

1 August 1996
10:00

Report

China	75–115	Greece
Scoring by half: 24–50, 51–65
Pts: Wu 20; Rebs: Liu 8 Asts: Li 7		Pts: Fasoulas 19; Rebs: Christodoulou 12; Asts: Christodoulou 8

Atlanta
Referees: Joseph Derosa (USA), Tomislav Jovancic (YUG)

7th Place match

2 August 1996
20:00

Report

China	85–99	Croatia
Scoring by half: 39–49, 46–50
Pts: Hu 22; Rebs: Gong 9 Asts: Li, Sun 5		Pts: Kukoč 26; Rebs: Kukoč 10; Asts: Kukoč 8

Atlanta
Referees: Robert Barnett (AUS), Raul Chaves Sagel (ARG)

=== Women's tournament ===
Team roster

- Zheng Dongmei
- Liang Xin
- Zheng Haixia
- He Jun
- Ma Zongqing
- Miao Bo
- Li Xin
- Liu Jun
- Shen Li
- Chu Hui
- Li Dongmei
- Ma Chengqing

Preliminary round

Pos	Team	Pld	W	L	PF	PA	PD	Pts	Qualification
1	Brazil	5	5	0	424	360	+64	10	Quarterfinals
2	Russia	5	4	1	378	342	+36	9	Quarterfinals
3	Italy	5	3	2	330	309	+21	8	Quarterfinals
4	Japan	5	2	3	365	396	−31	7	Quarterfinals
5	China	5	1	4	347	378	−31	6	
6	Canada	5	0	5	293	352	−59	5	

Source: FIBA archive
Rules for classification: 1) points; 2) head-to-head points; 3) head-to-head goal average; 4) head-to-head number of points scored.

21 July 1996

Boxscore

Italy	62–53	China
Pts: Caselin 16; Rebs: Schiesaro 5 Asts: Caselin, Ballabio 3		Pts: Li X, Liu J 15; Rebs: three players 5 Asts: Li X, Li D 4

Morehouse College Gymnasium, Atlanta

23 July 1996

Boxscore

China	72–75	Japan
Pts: Zheng H 31; Rebs: Zheng H 16; Asts: Li X 6		Pts: Hagiwara 23; Rebs: Kato 10; Asts: Murakami 4

Morehouse College Gymnasium, Atlanta

25 July 1996

Boxscore

Canada	49–61	China
Pts: three players 8 Rebs: Norman 9 Asts: Evans 5		Pts: Zheng H 19; Rebs: Zheng H 16; Asts: Zheng D 4

Morehouse College Gymnasium, Atlanta

27 July 1996

Boxscore

China	83–98	Brazil
Pts: He J 22; Rebs: Liang X 5 Asts: Zheng D, Liu J 6		Pts: Janeth 26; Rebs: three players 9 Asts: Paula 8

Morehouse College Gymnasium, Atlanta

29 July 1996

Boxscore

Russia	94–78	China
Pts: Baranova 26; Rebs: Baranova 18; Asts: Sumnikova 10		Pts: Zheng D, Ma Z 14; Rebs: Liang X 6 Asts: Zheng D 5

Morehouse College Gymnasium, Atlanta

Classification Round 9th−12th place

31 July 1996
10:00

Boxscore

Zaire	67–91	China
Scoring by half: 36–47, 31–44
Pts: Mabika 30; Rebs: Lobela 9 Asts: Ngalula 3		Pts: Zheng H 26; Rebs: Zheng H 10; Asts: Ma Z 6

Georgia Dome, Atlanta

9th place match

3 August 1996
12:00

Boxscore

China	85–71	South Korea
Scoring by half: 48–39, 37–32
Pts: Zheng H 29; Rebs: Zheng H 10; Asts: Zheng D 10		Pts: Chun J-w 20; Rebs: Yoo Y-j 6 Asts: Han H-s 5

Georgia Dome, Atlanta

== Boxing ==
Athlete	Event	Round of 32	Round of 16	Quarterfinals	Semifinals	Final	
Athlete	Event	Opposition Result	Opposition Result	Opposition Result	Opposition Result	Opposition Result	Rank
Yang Xiangzhong	Light flyweight	Rossel (PER); W 16–7	Berhili (MAR); L 9–14	Did not advance			
Chen Tao	Middleweight	Moto (JPN); L 10–15	Did not advance				
Jiang Tao	Heavyweight	Bye	Kizza (UGA); W 10–7	Jones (USA); L 4–21	Did not advance		

== Canoeing ==
Men

Athlete	Event	Heats		Repechage		Semifinals		Final	
Athlete	Event	Time	Rank	Time	Rank	Time	Rank	Time	Rank
Xu Haifeng; Wu Yubiao	K-2 500 metres	1:37.677	7 R	1:41.035	7	Did not advance			
Xu Haifeng; Wu Yubiao	K-2 1000 metres	3:50.978	8 R	3:41.196	7	Did not advance			

Women

Athlete	Event	Heats		Repechage		Semifinals		Final	
Athlete	Event	Time	Rank	Time	Rank	Time	Rank	Time	Rank
Gao Beibei	K-1 500 metres	1:59.543	7 R	1:59.095	4 SF	1:57.498	9	Did not advance	
Ning Menghua; Hu Dongmei	K-2 500 metres	1:50.721	5 R	1:53.544	2 SF	1:49.189	8	Did not advance	
Xian Bangdi; Gao Beibei; Dong Ying; Zhang Qin	K-4 500 metres	1:40.145	1 F	—N/a		Bye		1:33.089	4

== Cycling ==
=== Road ===
Women

Athlete	Event	Time	Rank
Guo Xinghong	Road race	2:49:47	41
Zhao Haijuan	Road race	DNF	

=== Track ===
Sprint

Athlete	Event	Qualification		Round 1	Repechage	Round 2	Repechage 2	Round of 16	rRepechage 3	Quarterfinals	Semifinals	Final	
Athlete	Event	Time Speed (km/h)	Rank	Opposition Time Speed (km/h)	Opposition Time Speed (km/h)	Opposition Time Speed (km/h)	Opposition Time Speed (km/h)	Opposition Time Speed (km/h)	Opposition Time Speed (km/h)	Opposition Time Speed (km/h)	Opposition Time Speed (km/h)	Opposition Time Speed (km/h)	Rank
Wang Yan	Women's sprint	11.519	5 Q	Dubnicoff (CAN); L	Larreal (VEN), Kasslin (FIN); W 12.067	—N/a				Ferris (AUS); L, L	Did not advance	Grishina (RUS), Salumäe (EST), Dubnicoff (CAN); L	7

Pursuit

Athlete	Event	Qualification		Quarterfinals	Semifinals	Final	
Athlete	Event	Time	Rank	Opposition Time	Opposition Time	Opposition Time	Rank
Wang Qingzhi	Women's individual pursuit	3:49.823	11	Did not advance			

Points race

Athlete	Event	Laps	Points	Rank
Wang Yan	Women's points race	DNF		

=== Mountain biking ===
Athlete	Event	Time	Rank
Gao Hongying	Women's cross-country	2:09:08	25

== Diving ==
Men

Athlete	Event	Preliminary		Semifinal		Final	
Athlete	Event	Points	Rank	Points	Rank	Points	Rank
Xiong Ni	3 metre springboard	463.02	1 Q	694.47	1 Q	701.46	1st place, gold medalist(s)
Yu Zhuocheng	3 metre springboard	438.93	2 Q	662.34	2 Q	690.93	2nd place, silver medalist(s)
Tian Liang	10 metre platform	425.73	3 Q	611.49	3 Q	648.18	4
Xiao Hailiang	10 metre platform	445.86	2 Q	625.41	2 Q	658.20	3rd place, bronze medalist(s)

Women

Athlete	Event	Preliminary		Semifinal		Final	
Athlete	Event	Points	Rank	Points	Rank	Points	Rank
Fu Mingxia	3 metre springboard	284.28	4 Q	505.77	4 Q	547.68	1st place, gold medalist(s)
Tan Shuping	3 metre springboard	212.49	23	Did not advance			
Fu Mingxia	10 metre platform	329.25	1 Q	509.19	1 Q	521.58	1st place, gold medalist(s)
Guo Jingjing	10 metre platform	315.39	4 Q	492.69	2 Q	447.21	5

== Fencing ==
Nine fencers, five men and four women, represented China in 1996.

Men

Athlete	Event	Round of 64	Round of 32	Round of 16	Quarterfinals	Semifinals	Final	
Athlete	Event	Opposition Result	Opposition Result	Opposition Result	Opposition Result	Opposition Result	Opposition Result	Rank
Dong Zhaozhi	Foil	Kim (KOR); L 12–15	Did not advance					
Wang Haibin	Foil	Devine (USA); W 15–12	Tucker (CUB); L 11–15	Did not advance				
Ye Chong	Foil	Ruziyev (UZB); W 15–4	Koch (GER); W 15–13	Holubytskyi (UKR); L 14–15	Did not advance			
Dong Zhaozhi; Wang Haibin; Ye Chong	Team foil	—N/a		South Korea; L 42–45	—N/a	Bye	United States; W 45–42	9
Zhao Gang	Épée	Mechkov (BUL); W 15–12	Kaaberma (EST); L 6–15	Did not advance				
Yan Xiandong	Sabre	Plourde (CAN); L 9–15	Did not advance					

Women

Athlete	Event	Round of 64	Round of 32	Round of 16	Quarterfinals	Semifinals	Final	
Athlete	Event	Opposition Result	Opposition Result	Opposition Result	Opposition Result	Opposition Result	Opposition Result	Rank
Liang Jun	Foil	Salhi (ALG); W 15–7	Fichtel-Mauritz (GER); L 10–15	Did not advance				
Wang Huifeng	Foil	Carbone (ARG); W 15–4	Bianchedi (ITA); L 10–15	Did not advance				
Xiao Aihua	Foil	Bye	Angelova (BUL); W 15–4	Jánosi-Németh (HUN); W 15–7	Trillini (ITA); L 7–15	Did not advance		
Liang Jun; Wang Huifeng; Xiao Aihua	Team foil	—N/a		Israel; W 45–29	Italy; L 24–45	France; L 44–45	Poland; W 45–32	7
Yan Jing	Épée	Kubo (JPN); W 15–10	Moressée-Pichot (FRA); L 14–15	Did not advance				

== Football ==
=== Summary ===
Key:

- A.E.T – After extra time.
- P – Match decided by penalty-shootout.

Team	Event	Group stage				Semifinal	Final / BM	
Team	Event	Opposition Score	Opposition Score	Opposition Score	Rank	Opposition Score	Opposition Score	Rank
China women's	Women's tournament	Sweden; W 2–0	Denmark; W 5–1	United States; D 0–0	1 Q	Brazil; W 3–2	United States; L 1–2	2nd place, silver medalist(s)

=== Women's tournament ===
Team roster

Head coach: Ma Yuanan

No.	Pos.	Player	Date of birth (age)	Caps	Goals	Club
1	GK	Zhong Honglian	27 October 1967 (aged 28)			
2	DF	Wang Liping	12 November 1973 (aged 22)			
3	DF	Fan Yunjie	29 April 1972 (aged 24)			
4	DF	Yu Hongqi	2 February 1973 (aged 23)			
5	DF	Xie Huilin	17 January 1975 (aged 21)			
6	MF	Zhao Lihong	25 December 1972 (aged 23)			
7	FW	Wei Haiying	1 May 1971 (aged 25)			
8	MF	Shui Qingxia	18 December 1966 (aged 29)			
9	MF	Sun Wen (captain)	6 April 1973 (aged 23)			
10	MF	Liu Ailing	2 May 1967 (aged 29)			
11	FW	Sun Qingmei	19 June 1966 (aged 30)			
12	DF	Wen Lirong	2 October 1969 (aged 26)			(Japan Football Association) Prima Ham FC Ku-No-Ichi
13	MF	Liu Ying	11 June 1974 (aged 22)			
14	MF	Chen Yufeng	17 January 1970 (aged 26)			
15	FW	Shi Guihong	13 February 1968 (aged 28)			
16	GK	Gao Hong	27 November 1967 (aged 28)			

Unenrolled alternate players
No.	Pos.	Player	Date of birth (age)	Caps	Goals	Club
17		Li Yating				
18	FW	Zhang Yan	6 August 1972 (aged 23)			
19	GK	Zhao Yan	7 May 1972 (aged 24)			
20	DF	Niu Lijie	12 April 1969 (aged 27)			

Group play

Pos	Team	Pld	W	D	L	GF	GA	GD	Pts	Qualification
1	China	3	2	1	0	7	1	+6	7	Semi-finals
2	United States (H)	3	2	1	0	5	1	+4	7	Semi-finals
3	Sweden	3	1	0	2	4	5	−1	3	
4	Denmark	3	0	0	3	2	11	−9	0	

Source: FIFA
Rules for classification: Tiebreakers
(H) Hosts
21 July 1996
16:00

Sweden	0–2	China
	Report (FIFA)	Shi Guihong 31'; Zhao Lihong 32'

Orange Bowl, Miami, Florida
Attendance: 46,724
Referee: Gamal Al-Ghandour (Egypt)

23 July 1996
16:00

Denmark	1–5	China
Madsen 55'	Report (FIFA)	Shi Guihong 10'; Liu Ailing 49'; Sun Qingmei 29', 59'; Fan Yunjie 36'

Orange Bowl, Miami, Florida
Attendance: 34,871
Referee: Benito Archundia (Mexico)

25 July 1996
18:30

United States	0–0	China
	Report (FIFA)

Orange Bowl, Miami, Florida
Attendance: 55,650
Referee: Pierluigi Collina (Italy)

Semi-final

28 July 1996

China	3–2	Brazil
Qingmei 5'; Haiying 83', 90'	Report	Roseli 67'; Pretinha 72'

Sanford Stadium, Athens, Georgia
Attendance: 64,196
Referee: Ingrid Jonsson (Sweden)

Gold medal match

1 August 1996

China	1–2	United States
Sun 32'	Report	MacMillan 19'; Milbrett 68'

Sanford Stadium, Athens, Georgia
Attendance: 76,489
Referee: Bente Ovedie Skogvang (Norway)

== Gymnastics ==
=== Artistic ===
==== Men ====
Team

Athlete	Event	Qualification							
Athlete	Event	Apparatus						Total	Rank
Athlete	Event	F	PH	R	V	PB	HB	Total	Rank
Fan Bin	Team	9.625	19.549 Q	18.987	18.675	19.012	19.375 Q	105.223	64
Fan Hongbin	Team	19.187	—N/a	19.287 Q	9.650	—N/a		48.124	109
Huang Huadong	Team	18.962	19.425 Q	18.500	9.537	18.912	18.200	103.536	71
Huang Liping	Team	9.400	18.875	—N/a	19.250	19.387 Q	18.925	85.837	90
Li Xiaoshuang	Team	19.350 Q	19.400	18.150	19.337 Q	19.262	19.287	114.786	6 Q
Shen Jian	Team	18.775	19.187	19.162	19.249	19.200	18.650	114.223	13 Q
Zhang Jinjing	Team	18.849	19.099	18.900	19.212	19.299 Q	19.237	114.596	8 Q
Total	Team	95.561	96.685	95.336	96.273	96.210	95.474	575.539	2nd place, silver medalist(s)

Individual finals

Athlete	Event	Apparatus						Total	Rank
Athlete	Event	F	PH	R	V	PB	HB	Total	Rank
Fan Bin	Pommel horse	—N/a	9.300	—N/a				9.300	8
Fan Bin	Horizontal bar	—N/a					9.800	9.800	3rd place, bronze medalist(s)
Fan Hongbin	Rings	—N/a		9.762	—N/a			9.762	5
Huang Huadong	Pommel horse	—N/a	9.712	—N/a				9.712	5
Huang Liping	Parallel bars	—N/a				9.737	—N/a	9.737	6
Li Xiaoshuang	All-around	9.687	9.712	9.775	9.812	9.650	9.787	58.423	1st place, gold medalist(s)
Li Xiaoshuang	Floor	9.837	—N/a					9.837	2nd place, silver medalist(s)
Li Xiaoshuang	Vault	—N/a			9.643	—N/a		9.643	5
Shen Jian	All-around	9.537	9.650	9.637	9.662	9.700	9.675	57.861	5
Zhang Jinjing	All-around	9.637	9.750	9.562	9.650	9.762	9.787	58.148	4
Zhang Jinjing	Parallel bars	—N/a				9.750	—N/a	9.750	4

==== Women ====
Team

Athlete	Event	Qualification					
Athlete	Event	Apparatus				Total	Rank
Athlete	Event	V	UB	BB	F	Total	Rank
Bi Wenjing	Team	9.625	19.575 Q	18.912	—N/a	48.112	91
Ji Liya	Team	19.400	19.299	—N/a	19.587 Q	58.286	81
Kui Yuanyuan	Team	19.150	—N/a	18.800	19.449	57.399	84
Liu Xuan	Team	9.650	18.987	18.825	19.125	66.587	75
Mao Yanling	Team	18.974	19.287	19.150	19.287	76.698	18 Q
Mo Huilan	Team	19.537 Q	19.237	18.962	19.525 Q	77.261	13 Q
Qiao Ya	Team	19.112	18.550	19.049	19.124	75.835	29 Q
Total	Team	96.474	96.785	95.498	97.110	385.867	4

Individual finals

Athlete	Event						
Athlete	Event	Apparatus				Total	Rank
Athlete	Event	V	UB	BB	F	Total	Rank
Bi Wenjing	Uneven bars	—N/a	9.837	—N/a		9.837	2nd place, silver medalist(s)
Ji Liya	Floor	—N/a			9.637	9.637	8
Mao Yanling	All-around	9.693	9.700	9.200	9.650	38.243	19
Mo Huilan	All-around	9.799	9.800	9.800	9.650	39.049	5
Mo Huilan	Vault	9.768	—N/a			9.768	2nd place, silver medalist(s)
Mo Huilan	Floor	—N/a			9.700	9.700	6
Qiao Ya	All-around	9.718	9.600	9.725	9.675	38.718	11

=== Rhythmic ===
Group all-around

Athlete	Event	Qualification				Final			
Athlete	Event	Hoop	Ball + Ribbon	Total	Rank	Hoop	Ball + Ribbon	Total	Rank
Cai Yingying; Huang Ting; Huang Ying; Zheng Ni; Zhong Li	Group	19.133	18.999	38.132	6 Q	19.199	18.800	37.999	5

Individual all-around

Athlete	Event	Qualification						Semifinal						Final					
Athlete	Event	Hoop	Ball	Clubs	Ribbon	Total	Rank	Hoop	Ball	Clubs	Ribbon	Total	Rank	Hoop	Ball	Clubs	Ribbon	Total	Rank
Wu Bei	Individual	9.216	9.249	8.933	8.899	36.297	35	Did not advance											
Zhou Xiaojing	Individual	9.333	9.416	9.416	9.383	37.548	16 Q	9.200	9.266	9.250	9.400	37.116	17	Did not advance					

== Handball ==
=== Summary ===
Key:

- A.E.T – After extra time.
- P – Match decided by penalty-shootout.

Team	Event	Group stage				Semifinal	Final / BM	
Team	Event	Opposition Score	Opposition Score	Opposition Score	Rank	Opposition Score	Opposition Score	Rank
China women's	Women's tournament	Hungary; L 19–29	Denmark; L 22–31	United States; W 31–21	3	—N/a	5th Place Match; Germany; W 28–26	5

=== Women's tournament ===
Team roster

- Che Zhihong
- Chen Bangping
- Chen Haiyun
- Cong Yanxia
- Li Jianfang
- Shi Wei
- Wang Tao
- Yu Geli
- Zhai Chao
- Zhang Li
- Zhang Limei
- Zhao Ying

Group play

Pos	Team	Pld	W	D	L	GF	GA	GD	Pts	Qualification
1	Denmark	3	3	0	0	89	62	+27	6	Semifinals
2	Hungary	3	2	0	1	81	70	+11	4	Semifinals
3	China	3	1	0	2	71	83	−12	2	Fifth place game
4	United States (H)	3	0	0	3	64	90	−26	0	Seventh place game

Rules for classification: 1) points; 2) head-to-head points; 3) head-to-head goal difference; 4) head-to-head number of goals scored; 5) goal difference.
(H) Hosts

26 July 1996; 10:00	Hungary	29–19	China	Georgia World Congress Center; Referees: Øie, Høgsnes (NOR)
26 July 1996; 10:00	Mátéfi 11	(14–11)	Shi 5	Georgia World Congress Center; Referees: Øie, Høgsnes (NOR)

28 July 1996; 12:00	China	21–33	Denmark	Georgia World Congress Center; Referees: Moelle Mabounda, Mvoula (CGO)
28 July 1996; 12:00	Shi 6	(9–19)	Madsen 7	Georgia World Congress Center; Referees: Moelle Mabounda, Mvoula (CGO)

30 July 1996; 16:30	China	31–21	United States	Georgia World Congress Center; Referees: Guterman, Gedvilas (LTU)
30 July 1996; 16:30	Zhai 11	(16–11)	Hires 6	Georgia World Congress Center; Referees: Guterman, Gedvilas (LTU)

5th place match

1 August 1996; 14:30	Germany	26–28	China	Georgia World Congress Center; Referees: Vujnović, Mladinić (CRO)
1 August 1996; 14:30	Heinz 7	(12–16)	Shi 12	Georgia World Congress Center; Referees: Vujnović, Mladinić (CRO)

== Judo ==
Men

Athlete	Event	Round of 64	Round of 32	Round of 16	Quarterfinals	Semifinals	Repechage			Final	
Athlete	Event	Round of 64	Round of 32	Round of 16	Quarterfinals	Semifinals	Round 1	Round 2	Round 3	Final	
Athlete	Event	Opposition Result	Opposition Result	Opposition Result	Opposition Result	Opposition Result	Opposition Result	Opposition Result	Opposition Result	Opposition Result	Rank
Zhang Guangjun	–65 kg	Bye	Tan (CAN); L	Did not advance							
Yuan Chao	–78 kg	Bye	Gevorgyan (ARM); W	Bouras (FRA); L	Did not advance		Savchishkin (RUS); L	Did not advance			
Ao Tegen	–86 kg	Pisula (POL); W	Maltsev (RUS); L	Did not advance							
Liu Shenggang	+95 kg	Bye	Lungu (ROU); W	Sergeyev (KGZ); W	Kosorotov (RUS); W	Pérez (ESP); L	—N/a			Van Barneveld (BEL); L	5

Women

Athlete	Event	Round of 32	Round of 16	Quarterfinals	Semifinals	Repechage			Final	
Athlete	Event	Round of 32	Round of 16	Quarterfinals	Semifinals	Round 1	Round 2	Round 3	Final	
Athlete	Event	Opposition Result	Opposition Result	Opposition Result	Opposition Result	Opposition Result	Opposition Result	Opposition Result	Opposition Result	Rank
Li Aiyue	–48 kg	Nichilo (FRA); L	Did not advance							
Wang Jin	–52 kg	Sugawara (JPN); L	Did not advance							
Liu Chuang	–56 kg	Garipova (RUS); W	West (USA); W	Huang (TPE); W	González (CUB); L	—N/a			Lomba (BEL); L	5
Liu Lizhe	–61 kg	Bye	Kobaş (TUR); L	Did not advance						
Wang Xianbo	–66 kg	Bye	Cho (KOR); L	Did not advance		Campos (BRA); W	Piña (DOM); W	Ogasawara (USA); W	Dubois (FRA); W	3rd place, bronze medalist(s)
Leng Chunhui	–72 kg	Chen (TPE); W	Scapin (ITA); L	Did not advance						
Sun Fuming	+72 kg	Bye	Rogers (GBR); W	Hagn (GER); W	Gundarenko (RUS); W	—N/a			Rodríguez (CUB); W	1st place, gold medalist(s)

== Rowing ==
Men

Athlete	Event	Heats		Repechage		Semifinals		Final	
Athlete	Event	Time	Rank	Time	Rank	Time	Rank	Time	Rank
Huang Xiaoping; Sun Jun; Liang Hongming; Liu Xianbin	Coxless four	6:30.16	5 R	6:29.95	2 SA/B	6:25.79	6 FB	5:58.22	10

Women

Athlete	Event	Heats		Repechage		Semifinals		Final	
Athlete	Event	Time	Rank	Time	Rank	Time	Rank	Time	Rank
Liu Xiaochun	Single sculls	8:12.82	3 R	8:37.01	3 SA/B	8:15.83	6 FB	7:33.67	11
Cao Mianying; Zhang Xiuyun	Double sculls	7:26.47	2 SA/B	Bye		7:15.47	1 FA	6:58.35	2nd place, silver medalist(s)
Li Fei; Ou Shaoyan	Lightweight double sculls	7:36.71	4 R	7:10.96	3 SA/B	7:23.46	4 FB	7:07.81	9
Cao Mianying; Zhang Xiuyun; Liu Xirong; Gu Xiaoli	Quadruple sculls	6:46.00	3 R	6:21.23	2 FA	—N/a		6:31.10	5
Liang Xiling; Jing Yanhua	Coxless pair	7:46.80	3 SA/B	Bye		7:36.40	4 FB	7:15.41	7

== Sailing ==
Men

Athlete	Event	Race									Net points	Final rank
Athlete	Event	1	2	3	4	5	6	7	8	9	Net points	Final rank
Qian Hong	Mistral One Design	~~27~~	12	~~19~~	10	11	13	10	6	12	74	12

Women

Athlete	Event	Race											Net points	Final rank
Athlete	Event	1	2	3	4	5	6	7	8	9	10	11	Net points	Final rank
Li Ke	Mistral One Design	4	~~14~~	5	~~9~~	2	7	6	2	3	—N/a		29	4
Liu Haimei; Ji Fengqin	470	15	14	~~23~~	21	21	22	21	15	20	~~23~~	20.5	169.5	21

Open
Fleet racing

Athlete	Event	Race											Net points	Final rank
Athlete	Event	1	2	3	4	5	6	7	8	9	10	11	Net points	Final rank
Cao Xiaobo	Laser	30	24	~~32~~	28	28	29	30	27	~~38~~	32	13	241	32

== Shooting ==
Men

Athlete	Event	Qualification		Final	
Athlete	Event	Points	Rank	Points	Rank
Chen Dongjie	Skeet	121	9	Did not advance	
Chen Xianjun	50 m rifle three positions	1148	42	Did not advance	
Chen Xianjun	50 m rifle prone	594	20	Did not advance	
Li Bo	Double trap	138	7	Did not advance	
Li Haicong	10 m air rifle	587	22	Did not advance	
Li Wenjie	50 m rifle prone	595	11	Did not advance	
Meng Gang	25 m rapid fire pistol	587	5 Q	687.1	5
Ning Lijia	50 m rifle three positions	1165	10	Did not advance	
Ning Lijia	10 m air rifle	588	18	Did not advance	
Tan Zongliang	10 m air pistol	581	8 Q	682.0	6
Wang Yifu	50 m pistol	564	5 Q	659.3	6
Wang Yifu	10 m air pistol	587	1 Q	684.1	2nd place, silver medalist(s)
Xiao Jun	10 m running target	577	6 Q	679.8	2nd place, silver medalist(s)
Xu Dan	50 m pistol	552	30	Did not advance	
Yang Ling	10 m running target	585	1 Q	685.8	1st place, gold medalist(s)
Zhang Bing	Trap	122	6 Q	146	5
Zhang Bing	Double trap	140	3 Q	183	3rd place, bronze medalist(s)
Zhang Yongjie	Trap	121	9	Did not advance	
Zhang Xindong	Skeet	121	9	Did not advance	
Zhao Guisheng	Trap	118	31	Did not advance	

Women

Athlete	Event	Qualification		Final	
Athlete	Event	Points	Rank	Points	Rank
Chen Muhua	50 m rifle three positions	576	20	Did not advance	
Chen Muhua	10 m air rifle	390	20	Did not advance	
Gao E	Double trap	103	8	Did not advance	
Li Duihong	25 m pistol	589	1 Q	687.9	1st place, gold medalist(s)
Li Duihong	10 m air pistol	379	15	Did not advance	
Lu Fang	10 m air pistol	380	14	Did not advance	
Ma Ge	25 m pistol	578	9	Did not advance	
Xu Xiang	Double trap	100	11	Did not advance	
Xu Yanhua	10 m air rifle	393	9	Did not advance	
Zhang Qiuping	50 m rifle three positions	577	17	Did not advance	

== Softball ==
Summary

Team	Event	Round robin								Semi-final	Bronze medal game	Gold medal game	
Team	Event	Opposition Result	Opposition Result	Opposition Result	Opposition Result	Opposition Result	Opposition Result	Opposition Result	Rank	Opposition Result	Opposition Result	Opposition Result	Rank
China women's	Women's tournament	Australia; W 6–0	Japan; L 0–3	Canada; W 2–1	Puerto Rico; W 10–0	Netherlands; W 8–0	Chinese Taipei; W 1–0	United States; L 2–3	2 Q	United States; L 0–1	Australia; W 4–2	United States; L 1–3	2nd place, silver medalist(s)

Team roster

- Wei Qiang
- Tao Hua
- Xu Jian
- Zhang Chunfang
- Yan Fang
- Wang Ying
- An Zhongxin
- Wang Lihong
- Chen Hong
- He Liping
- Lei Li
- Liu Xuqing
- Liu Yaju
- Ma Ying
- Ou Jingbai
- Head coach: Li Minkuan

Group play

Team	W	L	RS	RA	WIN%	GB	Tiebreaker
United States	6	1	37	7	.857	-	-
China	5	2	29	9	.714	1	3 RA vs. AUS/JPN
Australia	5	2	22	11	.714	1	6 RA vs. CHN/JPN
Japan	5	2	24	18	.714	1	10 RA vs. CHN/AUS
Canada	3	4	15	17	.429	3	-
Chinese Taipei	2	5	19	19	.286	4	-
Netherlands	1	6	4	32	.143	5	1–0 vs. PUR
Puerto Rico	1	6	5	44	.143	5	0–1 vs. NED

Team	1	2	3	4	5	6	7	R	H	E
China	2	0	0	1	0	0	3	6	6	0
Australia	0	0	0	0	0	0	0	0	2	0
WP: Wang L (1–0) LP: Roche (0–1)

Team	1	2	3	4	5	6	7	R	H	E
China	0	0	0	0	0	0	0	0	6	0
Japan	0	0	0	0	0	3	–	3	5	1
WP: T Watanabe (1–0) LP: Wang L (1–1)

Team	1	2	3	4	5	6	7	R	H	E
China	2	0	0	0	0	0	0	2	5	1
Canada	0	0	1	0	0	0	0	1	5	2
WP: Wang L (2–1) LP: Sippel (1–1)

Team	1	2	3	4	5	R	H	E
China	0	5	1	4	0	10	11	0
Puerto Rico	0	0	0	0	0	0	1	5
WP: Ma (1–0) LP: Mize (0–1)

Team	1	2	3	4	5	6	7	R	H	E
Netherlands	0	0	0	0	0	0	0	0	0	3
China	2	0	0	3	2	1	–	8	13	1
WP: He (1–0) LP: Pannen (0–1)

Team	1	2	3	4	5	6	7	R	H	E
China	0	0	1	0	0	0	0	1	5	2
Chinese Taipei	0	0	0	0	0	0	0	0	1	0
WP: Wang L (3–1) LP: Tu HM (1–2)

Team	1	2	3	4	5	6	7	R	H	E
China	0	0	0	0	0	2	0	2	5	0
United States	0	1	0	0	0	2	–	3	8	1
WP: M Smith (2–0) LP: Wang L (3–2)

Semi-final

Team	1	2	3	4	5	6	7	8	9	10	R	H	E
China	0	0	0	0	0	0	0	0	0	0	0	3	2
United States	0	0	0	0	0	0	0	0	0	1	1	10	0
WP: Fernandez (1-1) LP: Wang L (3-2)

Bronze medal game

Team	1	2	3	4	5	6	7	R	H	E
China	0	1	0	1	1	0	1	4	5	2
Australia	0	2	0	2	0	0	0	2	2	2
WP: Wang L (4-2) LP: Roche (2-2)

Gold medal game

Team	1	2	3	4	5	6	7	R	H	E
China	0	0	0	0	0	1	0	1	4	2
United States	0	0	3	0	0	0	0	3	4	0
WP: Michele Granger (2-0) LP: Liu Y (0-1) Sv: Fernandez (1)

== Swimming ==
Men

Athlete	Event	Heats		Final A/B	
Athlete	Event	Time	Rank	Time	Rank
Jiang Chengji	50 m freestyle	22.55	3 FA	22.33	4
Jiang Chengji	100 m butterfly	53.40	4 FA	53.20	4
Wang Yiwu	200 m breaststroke	2:19.13	24	Did not advance	
Zeng Qiliang	100 m breaststroke	1:02.26	8 FA	1:02.01	7
Zhao Lifeng	100 m freestyle	51.70	39	Did not advance	
Zhao Yi	100 m backstroke	57.17	26	Did not advance	
Zhao Yi	200 m backstroke	2:13.31	39	Did not advance	
Jiang Chengji; Zeng Qiliang; Zhao Yi; Zhao Lifeng	4 × 100 m medley relay	3:43.50	13	Did not advance	

Women

Athlete	Event	Heats		Final A/B	
Athlete	Event	Time	Rank	Time	Rank
Cai Huijue	100 m butterfly	1:00.89	7 FA	1:00.46	7
Chen Yan	100 m backstroke	1:02.62	6 FA	1:02.50	5
Chen Yan	200 m backstroke	2:14.74	12 FB	2:14.37	11
Chen Yan	200 m freestyle	2:03.32	16 FB	Withdrew	
Chen Yan	400 m freestyle	4:22.55	29	Did not advance	
Chen Yan	400 m individual medley	4:53.87	17	Did not advance	
Han Xue	100 m breaststroke	1:10.40	13 FB	1:09.90	9
He Cihong	100 m backstroke	1:05.87	26	Did not advance	
Le Jingyi	50 m freestyle	25.10	1 FA	24.90	2nd place, silver medalist(s)
Le Jingyi	100 m freestyle	54.90	1 FA	54.50	1st place, gold medalist(s)
Lin Li	200 m breaststroke	2:30.64	9 FB	2:33.45	16
Lin Li	200 m individual medley	2:16.31	4 FA	2:14.74	3rd place, bronze medalist(s)
Liu Limin	100 m butterfly	1:00.18	3 FA	59.14	2nd place, silver medalist(s)
Liu Limin	200 m butterfly	2:13.12	8 FA	2:10.70	5
Pu Yiqi	800 m freestyle	8:45.32	12	Did not advance	
Qu Yun	200 m butterfly	2:11.35	4 FA	2:10.26	4
Shan Ying	50 m freestyle	25.71	5 FA	25.70	7
Shan Ying	100 m freestyle	56.10	9 FB	55.74	9
Shan Ying	200 m freestyle	2:04.29	23	Did not advance	
Wu Yanyan	200 m backstroke	2:20.89	28	Did not advance	
Wu Yanyan	200 m individual medley	2:16.55	10 FB	2:16.61	10
Wu Yanyan	400 m individual medley	4:54.07	18	Did not advance	
Yuan Yuan	100 m breaststroke	1:11.65	24	Did not advance	
Yuan Yuan	200 m breaststroke	2:33.89	24	Did not advance	
Le Jingyi; Chao Na; Nian Yun; Shan Ying	4 × 100 m freestyle relay	3:44.06	3 FA	3:40.48	2nd place, silver medalist(s)
Nian Yun; Wang Luna; Chen Yan; Shan Ying; Pu Yiqi (*)	4 × 200 m freestyle relay	8:13.29	8 FA	8:15.38	8
Chen Yan; Han Xue; Cai Huijue; Shan Ying	4 × 100 m medley relay	4:09.23	4 FA	4:07.34	3rd place, bronze medalist(s)

== Synchronized swimming ==
Athlete	Event	Technical routine		Free routine		Total	
Athlete	Event	Points	Rank	Points	Rank	Points	Rank
Long Yan; Li Min; Li Yuanyuan; Wu Chunlan; Chen Xuan; Guo Cui; Fu Yuling; Pan Yan	Team	94.600	6	93.867	7	94.124	7

== Table tennis ==
Men

Athlete	Event	Group Stage				Round of 16	Quarterfinal	Semifinal	Final	
Athlete	Event	Opposition Result	Opposition Result	Opposition Result	Rank	Opposition Result	Opposition Result	Opposition Result	Opposition Result	Rank
Kong Linghui	Singles	Osama (SUD); W 2–0	Tasaki (JPN); W 2–0	Chiang (TPE); W 2–0	1 Q	Kim (KOR); L 1–3	Did not advance			
Liu Guoliang	Singles	Smythe (AUS); W 2–0	Saive (BEL); W 2–0	Grujić (YUG); W 2–1	1 Q	Matsushita (JPN); W 3–0	Huang (CAN); W 3–1	Roßkopf (GER); W 3–1	Wang (CHN); W 3–2	1st place, gold medalist(s)
Wang Tao	Singles	Mutambuze (UGA); W 2–0	Heister (NED); W 2–1	Tsiokas (GRE); W 2–0	1 Q	Yoo (KOR); W 3–0	Samsonov (BLR); W 3–2	Korbel (CZE); W 3–0	Liu (CHN); L 2–3	2nd place, silver medalist(s)
Kong Linghui; Liu Guoliang	Doubles	Opoku / Addy (GHA); W 2–0	von Scheele / Karlsson (SWE); W 2–0	Legoût / Chila (FRA); W 2–0	1 Q	—N/a	Matsushita / Shibutani (JPN); W 3–0	Lee / Yoo (KOR); W 3–0	Lu / Wang (CHN); W 3–1	1st place, gold medalist(s)
Lu Lin; Wang Tao	Doubles	Langley / Lavale (AUS); W 2–0	Atiković / Primorac (CRO); W 2–0	Qian / Ding (AUT); W 2–0	1 Q	—N/a	Kang / Kim (KOR); W 3–2	Roßkopf / Fetzner (GER); W 3–0	Kong / Liu (CHN); L 1–3	2nd place, silver medalist(s)

Women

Athlete	Event	Group Stage				Round of 16	Quarterfinal	Semifinal	Final	
Athlete	Event	Opposition Result	Opposition Result	Opposition Result	Rank	Opposition Result	Opposition Result	Opposition Result	Opposition Result	Rank
Deng Yaping	Singles	Kyakobye (UGA); W 2–0	Lomas (GBR); W 2–0	Svensson (SWE); W 2–0	1 Q	Park (KOR); W 3–0	Struse (GER); W 3–0	Liu (CHN); W 3–1	Chen (TPE); W 3–2	1st place, gold medalist(s)
Liu Wei	Singles	Rodríguez (CHI); W 2–0	Popovová (SVK); W 2–1	Feng (USA); W 2–1	1 Q	Bădescu (ROU); W3–0	Kim (PRK); W 3–0	Deng (CHN); L 1–3	Qiao (CHN); L 1–3	4
Qiao Hong	Singles	Musoke (UGA); W 2–0	Wang-Dréchou (FRA); W 2–0	Sato (JPN); W 2–0	1 Q	Jing (SGP); W 3–0	Koyama (JPN); W 3–0	Chen (TPE); L 0–3	Liu (CHN); W 3–1	3rd place, bronze medalist(s)
Deng Yaping; Qiao Hong	Doubles	Coubat / Wang-Dréchou (FRA); W 2–0	Geng Lijuan / Chiu (CAN); W 2–0	—N/a	1 Q	—N/a	Chen / Chen (TPE); W 3–2	Kim / Park (KOR); W 3–1	Liu / Qiao (CHN); W 3–1	1st place, gold medalist(s)
Liu Wei; Qiao Yunping	Doubles	Rodríguez / Tepes (CHI); W 2–0	Holt / Lomas (GBR); W 2–0	Nemeș / Schöpp (GER); W 2–1	1 Q	—N/a	Koyama / Todo (JPN); W 3–0	Park / Ryu (KOR); W 3–1	Deng / Qiao (CHN); L 1–3	2nd place, silver medalist(s)

== Tennis ==
Men

Athlete	Event	Round of 64	Round of 32	Round of 16	Quarterfinals	Semifinals	Final	
Athlete	Event	Opposition Result	Opposition Result	Opposition Result	Opposition Result	Opposition Result	Opposition Result	Rank
Pan Bing; Xia Jiaping	Doubles	—N/a	Bhupathi / Paes (IND); L 6–4, 4–6, 4–6	Did not advance				

Women

Athlete	Event	Round of 64	Round of 32	Round of 16	Quarterfinals	Semifinals	Final	
Athlete	Event	Opposition Result	Opposition Result	Opposition Result	Opposition Result	Opposition Result	Opposition Result	Rank
Chen Li	Singles	Seles (USA); L 0–6, 4–6	Did not advance					
Yi Jingqian	Singles	Gorrochategui (ARG); L 2–6, 6–1, 1–6	Did not advance					
Chen Li; Yi Jingqian	Doubles	—N/a	Bradtke / Stubbs (AUS); W walkover	Sangaram / Tanasugarn (THA); L 6–2, 4–6, 4–6	Did not advance			

== Volleyball ==
=== Indoor ===
Summary

Team	Event	Group stage						Quarterfinal	Semifinal	Final / BM	
Team	Event	Opposition Score	Opposition Score	Opposition Score	Opposition Score	Opposition Score	Rank	Opposition Score	Opposition Score	Opposition Score	Rank
China women's	Women's tournament	Netherlands; W 3–0	South Korea; W 3–2	United States; W 3–1	Ukraine; W 3–0	Japan; W 3–0	1 Q	Germany; W 3–0	Russia; W 3–1	Cuba; L 1–3	2nd place, silver medalist(s)

=== Women's tournament ===
Team roster

- Cui Yongmei
- He Qi
- Lai Yawen
- Li Yan
- Liu Xiaoning
- Pan Wenli
- Sun Yue
- Wang Lina
- Wang Yi
- Wang Ziling
- Wu Yongmei
- Zhu Yunying
- Head coach: Lang Ping

Group play

Pos	Team	Pld	W	L	Pts	SW	SL	SR	SPW	SPL	SPR	Qualification
1	China	5	5	0	10	15	3	5.000	256	181	1.414	Quarterfinals
2	United States	5	4	1	9	13	5	2.600	241	198	1.217	Quarterfinals
3	Netherlands	5	3	2	8	10	7	1.429	211	179	1.179	Quarterfinals
4	South Korea	5	2	3	7	10	9	1.111	249	222	1.122	Quarterfinals
5	Japan	5	1	4	6	3	12	0.250	158	199	0.794	
6	Ukraine	5	0	5	5	0	15	0.000	89	225	0.396	

20 July 1996	Netherlands	0–3	China
20 July 1996	(10–15 ,5–15, 7–15); Report

22 July 1996	China	3–2	South Korea
22 July 1996	(17–16, 16–14, 2–15, 13–15, 15–13); Report

24 July 1996	United States	1–3	China
24 July 1996	(8–15, 2–15, 15–12, 12–15); Report

26 July 1996	China	3–0	Ukraine
26 July 1996	(15–4, 15–4, 15–6); Report

28 July 1996	Japan	0–3	China
28 July 1996	(14–16, 11–15, 10–15); Report

Quarterfinal

30 July 1996	China	3–0	Germany
30 July 1996	(15–12 ,15–8 ,15–8); Report

Semifinal

1 August 1996	China	3–1	Russia
1 August 1996	(12–15, 15–5, 15–8, 15–12); Report

Gold medal match

3 August 1996	China	1–3	Cuba
3 August 1996	(16–14, 12–15, 16–17, 6–15); Report

== Weightlifting ==
Athlete	Event	Snatch		Clean & jerk		Total	Rank
Athlete	Event	Result	Rank	Result	Rank	Total	Rank
Lan Shizhang	–54 kg	125.0	3	150.0	3	275.0	4
Zhang Xiangsen	–54 kg	130.0	2	150.0	3	280.0	2nd place, silver medalist(s)
Tang Lingsheng	–59 kg	137.5 OR	1	170.0 OR	1	307.5 WR	1st place, gold medalist(s)
Xu Dong	–59 kg	132.5	7	162.5	5	295.0	6
Wang Guohua	–64 kg	NVL		DNF			
Xiao Jiangang	–64 kg	145.0	2	177.5	3	322.5	3rd place, bronze medalist(s)
Wan Jianhui	–70 kg	152.5	4	180.0	7	332.5	7
Zhan Xugang	–70 kg	162.5 WR	1	195.0 WR	1	357.5 WR	1st place, gold medalist(s)
Lin Shoufeng	–76 kg	157.5	9	195.0	3	352.5	5
Cui Wenhua	–108 kg	190.0	4	215.0	6	405.0	5

== Wrestling ==
Greco-Roman

Athlete	Event	Round of 32	Round of 16	Quarterfinals	Semifinals	Repechage					Final	
Athlete	Event	Round of 32	Round of 16	Quarterfinals	Semifinals	Round 1	Round 2	Round 3	Round 4	Round 5	Final	
Athlete	Event	Opposition Result	Opposition Result	Opposition Result	Opposition Result	Opposition Result	Opposition Result	Opposition Result	Opposition Result	Opposition Result	Opposition Result	Rank
Sheng Zetian	–57 kg	Aghayev (AZE); W 5–4	Jansons (LAT); W 7–1	Bye	Hall (USA); L 0–1	—N/a				Sarmiento (CUB); W 8–2	Khakymov (UKR); W 4–0	3rd place, bronze medalist(s)
Hu Guohong	–62 kg	Manukyan (ARM); L 0–11	Did not advance			Sánchez (PUR); W 8–3	Pirim (TUR); L 1–3	Did not advance				
Ba Yanchuan	–100 kg	Gleasman (USA); L 2–15	Did not advance			Manov (BUL); L 0–4	Did not advance					
Liu Guoke	–130 kg	Schiekel (GER); L 0–3	Did not advance			Kuziev (UZB); L 1–6	Did not advance					

Freestyle

Athlete	Event	Round of 32	Round of 16	Quarterfinals	Semifinals	Repechage					Final	
Athlete	Event	Round of 32	Round of 16	Quarterfinals	Semifinals	Round 1	Round 2	Round 3	Round 4	Round 5	Final	
Athlete	Event	Opposition Result	Opposition Result	Opposition Result	Opposition Result	Opposition Result	Opposition Result	Opposition Result	Opposition Result	Opposition Result	Opposition Result	Rank
Feng Aigang	–130 kg	Far (PAN); W 11–0	Thiele (GER); L 1–1	Did not advance		—N/a	Bye	Valiyev (UKR); L 1–3	Did not advance			
