= Table tennis at the 1996 Summer Olympics – Women's singles =

Table tennis at the Olympics

Table tennis – Women's singles at the Games of the XXVI Olympiad
- Venue: Georgia World Congress Center
- Date: 24 to 31 July 1996
- Competitors: 63 from 37 nations

Medalists
1st place, gold medalist(s)		Deng Yaping	China
2nd place, silver medalist(s)		Chen Jing	Chinese Taipei
3rd place, bronze medalist(s)		Qiao Hong	China

These are the results of the women's singles competition, one of two events for female competitors in table tennis at the 1996 Summer Olympics in Atlanta.

== Group stage ==
=== Group A ===
Rank	Athlete	W	L	GW	GL	PW	PL	CHN	SWE	GBR	UGA
1	Deng Yaping (CHN)	3	0	6	0	126	53	X	2–0	2–0	2–0
2	Marie Svensson (SWE)	2	1	4	2	103	81	0–2	X	2–0	2–0
3	Lisa Lomas (GBR)	1	2	2	4	90	101	0–2	0–2	X	2–0
4	June Kyakobye (UGA)	0	3	0	6	42	126	0–2	0–2	0–2	X

=== Group B ===
Rank	Athlete	W	L	GW	GL	PW	PL	CHN	JPN	FRA	UGA
1	Qiao Hong (CHN)	3	0	6	0	126	71	X	2–0	2–0	2–0
2	Rika Sato (JPN)	2	1	4	2	118	89	0–2	X	2–0	2–0
3	Xiaoming Wang-Dréchou (FRA)	1	2	2	4	103	97	0–2	0–2	X	2–0
4	Mary Musoke (UGA)	0	3	0	6	36	126	0–2	0–2	0–2	X

=== Group C ===
Rank	Athlete	W	L	GW	GL	PW	PL	TPE	NZL	ITA	LIB
1	Chen Jing (TPE)	3	0	6	1	145	88	X	2–0	2–1	2–0
2	Chunli Li (NZL)	2	1	4	2	109	76	0–2	X	2–0	2–0
3	Alessia Arisi (ITA)	1	2	3	4	116	120	1–2	0–2	X	2–0
4	Larissa Chouaib (LIB)	0	3	0	6	40	126	0–2	0–2	0–2	X

=== Group D ===
Rank	Athlete	W	L	GW	GL	PW	PL	CHN	USA	SVK	CHI
1	Liu Wei (CHN)	3	0	6	2	161	112	X	2–1	2–1	2–0
2	Amy Feng (USA)	2	1	5	2	129	112	1–2	X	2–0	2–0
3	Valentina Popova (SVK)	1	2	3	4	126	119	1–2	0–2	X	2–0
4	Berta Rodríguez (CHI)	0	3	0	6	53	126	0–2	0–2	0–2	X

=== Group E ===
Rank	Athlete	W	L	GW	GL	PW	PL	HKG	ROU	NED	VEN
1	Chai Po Wa (HKG)	3	0	6	1	144	78	X	2–1	2–0	2–0
2	Adriana Simion (ROU)	2	1	5	2	126	106	1–2	X	2–0	2–0
3	Mirjam Hooman-Kloppenburg (NED)	1	2	2	4	100	114	0–2	0–2	X	2–0
4	Fabiola Ramos (VEN)	0	3	0	6	54	126	0–2	0–2	0–2	X

=== Group F ===
Rank	Athlete	W	L	GW	GL	PW	PL	CAN	KOR	NED
1	Lijuan Geng (CAN)	2	0	4	0	84	58	X	2–0	2–0
2	Park Gyeong-ae (KOR)	1	1	2	2	71	74	0–2	X	2–0
3	Gerdie Keen (NED)	0	2	0	4	61	84	0–2	0–2	X

=== Group G ===
Rank	Athlete	W	L	GW	GL	PW	PL	GER	JPN	CRO	TUN
1	Nicole Struse (GER)	3	0	6	1	144	80	X	2–1	2–0	2–0
2	Taeko Todo (JPN)	2	1	3	2	93	95	1–2	X	2–0	2–0
3	Tamara Boroš (CRO)	1	2	2	4	92	110	0–2	0–2	X	2–0
4	Sonia Touati (TUN)	0	3	0	4	40	84	0–2	0–2	0–2	X

=== Group H ===
Rank	Athlete	W	L	GW	GL	PW	PL	JPN	RUS	CZE	DOM
1	Chire Koyama (JPN)	3	0	6	1	141	110	X	2–1	2–0	2–0
2	Irina Palina (RUS)	2	1	5	2	134	104	1–2	X	2–0	2–0
3	Jana Dobešová (CZE)	1	2	2	4	108	102	0–2	0–2	X	2–0
4	Blanca Alejo (DOM)	0	3	0	6	59	126	0–2	0–2	0–2	X

=== Group I ===
Rank	Athlete	W	L	GW	GL	PW	PL	PRK	GER	RUS	NGR
1	Kim Hyon-hui (PRK)	3	0	6	0	128	100	X	2–0	2–0	2–0
2	Jie Schöpp (GER)	2	1	4	2	120	88	0–2	X	2–0	2–0
3	Elena Timina (RUS)	1	2	2	4	108	113	0–2	0–2	X	2–0
4	Olufunke Oshonaike (NGR)	0	3	0	6	71	126	0–2	0–2	0–2	X

=== Group J ===
Rank	Athlete	W	L	GW	GL	PW	PL	SIN	PRK	TPE	CAN
1	Jing Junhong (SIN)	3	0	6	1	146	105	X	2–1	2–0	2–0
2	Kim Hyang-mi (PRK)	2	1	5	3	159	135	1–2	X	2–1	2–0
3	Xu Jing (TPE)	1	2	3	4	120	123	0–2	1–2	X	2–0
4	Petra Cada (CAN)	0	3	0	6	64	126	0–2	0–2	0–2	X

=== Group K ===
Rank	Athlete	W	L	GW	GL	PW	PL	KOR	GER	TPE	TKM
1	Park Hae-Jeong (KOR)	3	0	6	0	128	86	X	2–0	2–0	2–0
2	Olga Nemes (GER)	2	1	4	2	120	100	0–2	X	2–0	2–0
3	Chen Chiu-tan (TPE)	1	2	2	4	104	103	0–2	0–2	X	2–0
4	Aida Steshenko (TKM)	0	3	0	6	63	126	0–2	0–2	0–2	X

=== Group L ===
Rank	Athlete	W	L	GW	GL	PW	PL	PRK	KOR	SWE	PER
1	Tu Jong-sil (PRK)	3	0	6	0	126	78	X	2–0	2–0	2–0
2	Yu Ji-Hye (KOR)	2	1	4	3	135	105	0–2	X	2–1	2–0
3	Åsa Svensson (SWE)	1	2	3	4	116	131	0–2	1–2	X	2–0
4	Eliana González (PER)	0	3	0	6	63	126	0–2	0–2	0–2	X

=== Group M ===
Rank	Athlete	W	L	GW	GL	PW	PL	HUN	ITA	AUS	INA
1	Csilla Bátorfi (HUN)	3	0	6	0	126	95	X	2–0	2–0	2–0
2	Fliura Abbate-Bulatova (ITA)	2	1	4	2	119	97	0–2	X	2–0	2–0
3	Shirley Zhou (AUS)	1	2	2	4	106	97	0–2	0–2	X	2–0
4	Rossy Pratiwi Dipoyanti (INA)	0	3	0	6	64	126	0–2	0–2	0–2	X

=== Group N ===
Rank	Athlete	W	L	GW	GL	PW	PL	ROU	LTU	NED	IND
1	Otilia Badescu (ROU)	3	0	6	1	144	82	X	2–1	2–0	2–0
2	Rūta Paškauskienė (LTU)	2	1	5	3	132	136	1–2	X	2–1	2–0
3	Bettine Vriesekoop (NED)	1	2	3	4	124	116	0–2	1–2	X	2–0
4	Ambika Radhika (IND)	0	3	0	6	60	126	0–2	0–2	0–2	X

=== Group O ===
Rank	Athlete	W	L	GW	GL	PW	PL	HKG	USA	HUN	BRA
1	Chan Tan Lui (HKG)	3	0	6	1	144	108	X	2–0	2–1	2–0
2	Lily Hugh-Yip (USA)	2	1	4	2	106	97	0–2	X	2–0	2–0
3	Krisztina Tóth (HUN)	1	2	3	4	134	121	1–2	0–2	X	2–0
4	Monica Doti (BRA)	0	3	0	6	68	126	0–2	0–2	0–2	X

=== Group P ===
Rank	Athlete	W	L	GW	GL	PW	PL	SUI	BRA	ROU	NGR
1	Dai-Yong Tu (SUI)	3	0	6	1	148	95	X	2–0	2–1	2–0
2	Lyanne Kosaka (BRA)	2	1	4	2	99	105	0–2	X	2–0	2–0
3	Emilia Ciosu (ROU)	1	2	3	5	151	157	1–2	0–2	X	2–1
4	Bose Kaffo (NGR)	0	3	1	6	103	144	0–2	0–2	1–2	X

== Knockout stage ==
First round
A1	Deng Yaping (CHN)	21	21	24
K1	Park Hae-jung (KOR)	14	19	22
P1	Dai-Yong Tu (SUI)	21	9	16	17
G1	Nicole Struse (GER)	18	21	21	21
E1	Chai Po Wa (HKG)	16	20	21	20
I1	Kim Hyon-hui (PRK)	21	22	14	22
N1	Otilia Badescu (ROU)	18	16	13
D1	Liu Wei (CHN)	21	21	21
C1	Chen Jing (TPE)	21	21	15	21
M1	Csilla Bátorfi (HUN)	13	14	21	14
O1	Chan Tan Lui (HKG)	14	21	21	21
F1	Lijuan Geng (CAN)	21	17	11	14
H1	Chire Koyama (JPN)	21	22	16	17	21
L1	Tu Jong-sil (PRK)	12	20	21	21	16
J1	Jing Junhong (SIN)	9	12	14
B1	Qiao Hong (CHN)	21	21	21

Quarterfinals
A1	Deng Yaping (CHN)	21	21	21
G1	Nicole Struse (GER)	16	9	13
I1	Kim Hyon-hui (PRK)	12	20	14
D1	Liu Wei (CHN)	21	22	21
C1	Chen Jing (TPE)	21	21	21
O1	Chan Tan Lui (HKG)	12	15	19
H1	Chire Koyama (JPN)	18	19	16
B1	Qiao Hong (CHN)	21	21	21

Semifinals
A1	Deng Yaping (CHN)	21	21	21	21
D1	Liu Wei (CHN)	23	17	19	9
C1	Chen Jing (TPE)	21	23	21
B1	Qiao Hong (CHN)	9	21	17

Gold medal match
A1	Deng Yaping (CHN)	21	21	20	17	21
C1	Chen Jing (TPE)	14	17	22	21	5
Bronze medal match
D1	Liu Wei (CHN)	17	21	19	11
B1	Qiao Hong (CHN)	21	15	21	21
