= Basketball at the 1996 Summer Olympics – Men's tournament =

Tournament details
- Host country: United States
- City: Atlanta
- Dates: July 20 – August 3, 1996
- Teams: 12 (from 5 confederations)
- Venues: 2 (in 1 host city)

Final positions
- Champions: United States (11th title)
- Runners-up: Yugoslavia
- Third place: Lithuania
- Fourth place: Australia

Tournament statistics
- Games played: 46
- Top scorer: (Brazil) Oscar Schmidt (27.4 points per game)

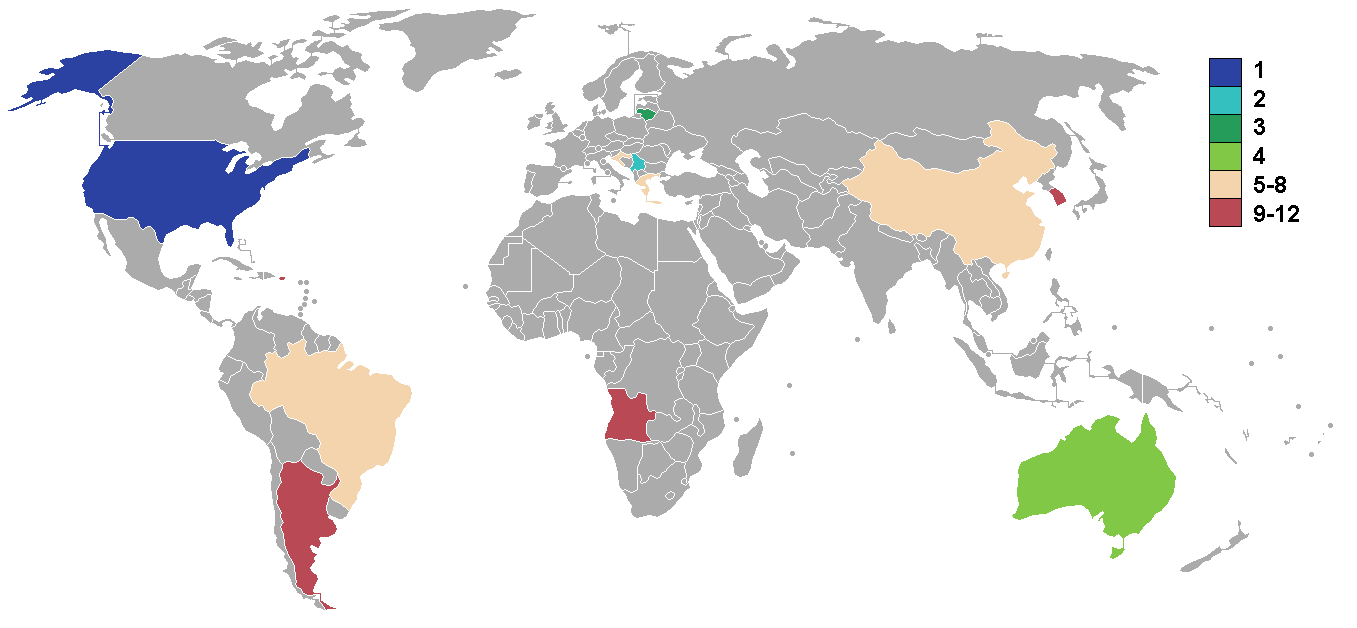
Competing teams

The men's tournament of basketball at the 1996 Olympics at Atlanta, United States, began on July 20 and ended on August 4, when the United States defeated FR Yugoslavia 95–69 for the gold medal.

== Participants ==
- Angola
- Argentina
- Australia
- Brazil
- China
- Croatia
- Greece
- Lithuania
- Puerto Rico
- South Korea
- United States (host)
- FR Yugoslavia

== Format ==
- Twelve teams are split into 2 preliminary round groups of 6 teams each. The top 4 teams from each group qualify for the knockout stage.
- Fifth and sixth-placed teams from each group are ranked 9th–12th in two additional matches.
- In the quarterfinals, the matchups are as follows: A1 vs. B4, A2 vs. B3, A3 vs. B2 and A4 vs. B1.
  - The eliminated teams at the quarterfinals are ranked 5th–8th in two additional matches.
- The winning teams from the quarterfinals meet in the semifinals as follows: A3/B2 vs. A1/B4 and A2/B3 vs. A4/B1.
- The winning teams from the semifinals dispute the gold medal. The losing teams dispute the bronze.

Ties are broken via the following the criteria, with the first option used first, all the way down to the last option:

1. Head to head results
2. Goal average (not the goal difference) between the tied teams
3. Goal average of the tied teams for all teams in its group

== Preliminary round ==
=== Group A ===
Pos	Team	Pld	W	L	PF	PA	PD	Pts	Qualification
1	United States (H)	5	5	0	522	345	+177	10	Quarterfinals
2	Lithuania	5	3	2	427	354	+73	8 (Note: Head-to-head record: Lithuania 1–0 Croatia)	Quarterfinals
3	Croatia	5	3	2	422	386	+36	8	Quarterfinals
4	China	5	2	3	360	502	−142	7 (Note: Head-to-head record: China 1–0 Argentina)	Quarterfinals
5	Argentina	5	2	3	351	396	−45	7	9th place playoff
6	Angola	5	0	5	280	379	−99	5	11th place playoff

Source: FIBA archive
Rules for classification: 1) points; 2) head-to-head points; 3) head-to-head goal average; 4) head-to-head number of points scored.
(H) Hosts
Notes:

20 July 1996

Report

China	70–67	Angola
Scoring by half: 36–36, 34–31
Pts: Wang 17; Rebs: Wang 11; Asts: Hu 3		Pts: Â. Victoriano, Carvalho 13; Rebs: Â. Victoriano 6 Asts: Avô 5

Atlanta
Referees: Jose Piovesan Neto (BRA), Juan Brea Diaz (CUB)

20 July 1996

Report

United States	96–68	Argentina
Scoring by half: 46–44, 50–24
Pts: Robinson 18; Rebs: Robinson 7 Asts: Hill, Hardaway 5		Pts: Espil 27; Rebs: Nicola 4 Asts: Milanesio 7

Atlanta
Referees: Gennaro Colucci (ITA), Stylianos Koukoulekidis (GRE)

20 July 1996

Report

Lithuania	83–81 (OT)	Croatia
Scoring by half: 37–31, 29–35 Overtime: 6–6, 11–9
Pts: Sabonis 20; Rebs: Sabonis 14; Asts: Vaišvila 6		Pts: Kukoč 33; Rebs: Rađa 12; Asts: Kukoč 6

Atlanta
Referees: Miguel Betancor Leon (ESP), Jose Lapaix Guance (DOM)

22 July 1996

Report

Angola	54–87	United States
Scoring by half: 31–44, 23–43
Pts: Carvalho 16; Rebs: Dias 5 Asts: Avô 5		Pts: Malone 12; Rebs: Barkley 9 Asts: Barkley 7

Atlanta
Referees: Michael Butler (AUS), Tomislav Jovancic (YUG)

22 July 1996

Report

Croatia	109–78	China
Scoring by half: 56–44, 53–34
Pts: Komazec 36; Rebs: Vranković 9 Asts: Kukoč 12		Pts: Wang, Zheng 15; Rebs: Gong 8 Asts: Sun 6

Atlanta
Referees: Jose Pelissari (BRA), Kim Chul-Hwan (KOR)

22 July 1996

Report

Argentina	65–61	Lithuania
Scoring by half: 31–25, 34–36
Pts: Espil 25; Rebs: Espil 6 Asts: Milanesio 6		Pts: Sabonis 30; Rebs: Sabonis 11; Asts: Marčiulionis 8

Atlanta
Referees: Carl Jungebrand (FIN), Juan Figueroa (PUR)

24 July 1996

Report

Croatia	71–48	Angola
Scoring by half: 26–23, 45–25
Pts: Rađa 20; Rebs: Rađa 9 Asts: Kukoč 6		Pts: Â. Victoriano, Dias 10; Rebs: Dias 12; Asts: Avô 2

Atlanta
Referees: Hidetoshi Ishida (JPN), Serguei Boulanov (RUS)

24 July 1996

Report

Lithuania	82–104	United States
Scoring by half: 42–50, 40–54
Pts: Einikis 21; Rebs: Karnišovas, Einikis 7 Asts: Pačėsas 5		Pts: Barkley 16; Rebs: Barkley 5 Asts: Stockton, Payton 7

Atlanta
Referees: Wieslaw Zych (POL), Jose Reyes Ronfini (MEX)

24 July 1996

Report

China	87–77	Argentina
Scoring by half: 51–38, 36–39
Pts: Zheng, Hu 22; Rebs: Zheng 9 Asts: Li 5		Pts: Espil 25; Rebs: Pérez 7 Asts: Milanesio 8

Atlanta
Referees: Robert Barnett (AUS), Roman Ryzhyk (UKR)

26 July 1996

Report

Angola	49–85	Lithuania
Scoring by half: 21–37, 28–48
Pts: Â. Victoriano 18; Rebs: Moreira Dias 6 Asts: Carvalho 4		Pts: Karnišovas 20; Rebs: Sabonis 10; Asts: Sabonis 8

Atlanta
Referees: Jose Pelissari (BRA), Robert Barnett (AUS)

26 July 1996

Report

Argentina	75–90	Croatia
Scoring by half: 29–43, 46–47
Pts: Espil 17; Rebs: Osella 6 Asts: Milanesio 5		Pts: Komazec 28; Rebs: Kukoč 8 Asts: Komazec, Mulaomerović 3

Atlanta
Referees: Jose Piovesan Neto (BRA), Pascal Noel Dorizon (FRA)

26 July 1996

Report

United States	133–70	China
Scoring by half: 65–28, 68–42
Pts: Pippen 24; Rebs: O'Neal 10; Asts: Hardaway 10		Pts: Liu 18; Rebs: Bateer 6 Asts: Li 5

Atlanta
Referees: Donald Cline (CAN), Hidetoshi Ishida (JPN)

28 July 1996

Report

Argentina	66–62	Angola
Scoring by half: 27–32, 39–30
Pts: Espil 21; Rebs: Villar 6 Asts: Osella 5		Pts: Dias 17; Rebs: Moreira Dias 7 Asts: Avô 4

Atlanta
Referees: Wieslaw Zych (POL), Chong Kyoung (KOR)

28 July 1996

Report

China	55–116	Lithuania
Scoring by half: 23–53, 32–63
Pts: Wang 18; Rebs: Wang 5 Asts: Li 4		Pts: Štombergas 19; Rebs: Einikis 9 Asts: Marčiulionis 7

Atlanta
Referees: Jose Reyes Ronfini (MEX), Juan Figueroa (PUR)

28 July 1996

Report

Croatia	71–102	United States
Scoring by half: 38–57, 33–45
Pts: Tabak 19; Rebs: Tabak 7 Asts: Kukoč 10		Pts: Richmond 16; Rebs: Barkley 12; Asts: Payton 7

Atlanta
Referees: Robert Barnett (AUS), Carl Jungebrand (FIN)

=== Group B ===
Pos	Team	Pld	W	L	PF	PA	PD	Pts	Qualification
1	FR Yugoslavia	5	5	0	478	364	+114	10	Quarterfinals
2	Australia	5	4	1	492	438	+54	9	Quarterfinals
3	Greece	5	3	2	402	416	−14	8	Quarterfinals
4	Brazil	5	2	3	498	494	+4	7	Quarterfinals
5	Puerto Rico	5	1	4	447	465	−18	6	9th place playoff
6	South Korea	5	0	5	422	562	−140	5	11th place playoff

Source: FIBA archive
Rules for classification: 1) points; 2) head-to-head points; 3) head-to-head goal average; 4) head-to-head number of points scored.

20 July 1996

Report

Australia	111–88	South Korea
Scoring by half: 64–37, 47–51
Pts: Gaze 26; Rebs: Dorge 10; Asts: Heal 11		Pts: J. K. Jung 23; Rebs: J. K. Jung 8 Asts: D. H. Kang 8

Atlanta
Referees: Davorin Nakic (CRO), Hidetoshi Ishida (JPN)

20 July 1996

Report

Puerto Rico	98–101	Brazil
Scoring by half: 54–58, 44–43
Pts: Ortiz 35; Rebs: Ortiz 11; Asts: Mincy 7		Pts: Schmidt 45; Rebs: Vianna 8 Asts: Ratto 10

Atlanta
Referees: Pascal Noel Dorizon (FRA), Romualdas Brazauskas (LTU)

20 July 1996

Report

Greece	63–71	FR Yugoslavia
Scoring by half: 30–30, 33–41
Pts: Fasoulas 21; Rebs: Fasoulas 10; Asts: Sigalas 4		Pts: Savić 21; Rebs: Divac 8 Asts: Đorđević 6

Atlanta
Referees: Donald Cline (CAN), Carl Jungebrand (FIN)

22 July 1996

Report

South Korea	86–98	Puerto Rico
Scoring by half: 52–51, 34–47
Pts: K. E. Moon 20; Rebs: J. Y. Hyun 11; Asts: Hur Jae 12		Pts: Ortiz 37; Rebs: Ortiz 14; Asts: Alicea 10

Atlanta
Referees: Roman Ryzhyk (UKR), Antonio Soares De Campos (ANG)

22 July 1996

Report

FR Yugoslavia	91–68	Australia
Scoring by half: 54–28, 37–40
Pts: Obradović 18; Rebs: Rebrača, Savić 5 Asts: Danilović 6		Pts: Bradtke 18; Rebs: Gaze 7 Asts: Gaze 8

Atlanta
Referees: Wieslaw Zych (POL), Jose Reyes Ronfini (MEX)

22 July 1996

Report

Brazil	87–89	Greece
Scoring by half: 54–54, 33–35
Pts: Schmidt 32; Rebs: dos Santos 10; Asts: Minuci 6		Pts: Oikonomou 36; Rebs: Fasoulas 6 Asts: Bakatsias 5

Atlanta
Referees: Joseph Derosa (USA), Miguel Betancor Leon (ESP)

24 July 1996

Report

FR Yugoslavia	118–65	South Korea
Scoring by half: 57–28, 61–37
Pts: Danilović 19; Rebs: Divac 8 Asts: Đorđević 10		Pts: J. Y. Hyun 20; Rebs: D. H. Kang 4 Asts: Hur Jae 5

Atlanta
Referees: Joseph Derosa (USA), Virun Thongpila (THA)

24 July 1996

Report

Greece	80–69	Puerto Rico
Scoring by half: 51–33, 29–36
Pts: Oikonomou 19; Rebs: Oikonomou 8 Asts: Oikonomou, Christodoulou 3		Pts: Mincy 20; Rebs: Mincy 8 Asts: Ortíz 4

Atlanta
Referees: Gennaro Colucci ITA, Raul Chaves Sagel (ARG)

24 July 1996

Report

Australia	109–101 (OT)	Brazil
Scoring by half: 41–46, 41–36 Overtime: 27–19
Pts: Heal 35; Rebs: Bradtke 15; Asts: Bradtke 4		Pts: Schmidt 24; Rebs: dos Santos 13; Asts: Minuci 6

Atlanta
Referees: Donald Cline (CAN), Carl Jungebrand (FIN)

26 July 1996

Report

South Korea	86–108	Greece
Scoring by half: 44–56, 42–52
Pts: J. Y. Hyun 24; Rebs: J. Y. Hyun 6 Asts: D. H. Kang 10		Pts: Sigalas 22; Rebs: Rentzias 8 Asts: Bakatsias, Sigalas 6

Atlanta
Referees: Romualdas Brazauskas (LTU), Yi Cui (CHN)

26 July 1996

Report

Brazil	82–101	FR Yugoslavia
Scoring by half: 31–55, 51–46
Pts: de Mello 19; Rebs: Janjao 6 Asts: Ratto, Klafke 4		Pts: Danilović 21; Rebs: Divac, Tomašević 6 Asts: Obradović 6

Atlanta
Referees: Gennaro Colucci ITA, Raul Chaves Sagel (ARG)

26 July 1996

Report

Puerto Rico	96–101	Australia
Scoring by half: 53–51, 43–50
Pts: Ortíz 30; Rebs: Ortíz 11; Asts: Rivera 7		Pts: Gaze 29; Rebs: Fisher, Bradtke 6 Asts: Heal 7

Atlanta
Referees: Miguel Betancor Leon (ESP), Jose Lapaix Guance (DOM)

28 July 1996

Report

Brazil	127–97	South Korea
Scoring by half: 66–49, 61–48
Pts: Schmidt 25; Rebs: dos Santos 8 Asts: Minuci 9		Pts: D. H. Kang 24; Rebs: J. Y. Hyun 6 Asts: D. H. Kang 7

Atlanta
Referees: Jiazhong Zhu (CHN), Tomislav Jovancic (YUG)

28 July 1996

Report

Australia	103–62	Greece
Scoring by half: 52–30, 51–32
Pts: Gaze 17; Rebs: Bradtke 8 Asts: Heal 5		Pts: Oikonomou 22; Rebs: Papanikolaou 6 Asts: Giannakis 4

Atlanta
Referees: Pascal Noel Dorizon (FRA), Jose Lapaix Guance (DOM)

28 July 1996

Report

FR Yugoslavia	97–86	Puerto Rico
Scoring by half: 45–34, 52–52
Pts: Danilović 22; Rebs: Divac 10; Asts: Đorđević 7		Pts: Ortiz 20; Rebs: Ortiz 11; Asts: Rivera 9

Atlanta
Referees: Donald Cline (CAN), Serguei Boulanov (RUS)

== Tournament bracket ==
Quarterfinals
B1	FR Yugoslavia	128
A4	China	61
A2	Lithuania	99
B3	Greece	66
A1	United States	98
B4	Brazil	75
B2	Australia	73
A3	Croatia	71

Semifinals
B1	FR Yugoslavia	66
A2	Lithuania	58
A1	United States	101
B2	Australia	73

Gold medal game
B1	FR Yugoslavia	69
A1	United States	95
Bronze medal game
A2	Lithuania	80
B2	Australia	74

== Quarterfinals ==
All times are local (UTC−5)

30 July 1996
10:00

Report

Lithuania	99–66	Greece
Scoring by half: 45–19, 54–47
Pts: Marčiulionis 16; Rebs: Sabonis 11; Asts: Marčiulionis 7		Pts: Sigalas 18; Rebs: Rentzias 4 Asts: Sigalas 5

Atlanta
Referees: Miguel Betancor Leon (ESP), Raul Chaves Sagel (ARG)

30 July 1996
12:00

Report

FR Yugoslavia	128–61	China
Scoring by half: 63–29, 65–32
Pts: Rebrača 22; Rebs: Topić 8 Asts: Berić, Đorđević 6		Pts: Wang 13; Rebs: Wang, Wu 4 Asts: Li 3

Atlanta
Referees: Hidetoshi Ishida (JPN), Gennaro Colucci ITA

30 July 1996
20:00

Report

Australia	73–71	Croatia
Scoring by half: 41–33, 32–38
Pts: Gaze 26; Rebs: Heal, Bradtke 5 Asts: Heal 7		Pts: Alanović 18; Rebs: Vranković 11; Asts: Kukoč 8

Atlanta
Referees: Wieslaw Zych (POL), Juan Figueroa (PUR)

30 July 1996
22:00

Report

United States	98–75	Brazil
Scoring by half: 52–36, 46–39
Pts: Hardaway 14; Rebs: O'Neal 11; Asts: Payton 7		Pts: Schmidt 26; Rebs: Janjao 10; Asts: Minuci 5

Atlanta
Referees: Pascal Noel Dorizon (FRA), Jose Lapaix Guance (DOM)

== Classification round ==
=== Placement Matches (9–12th Place) ===
30 July 1996
15:00

Report

Argentina	97–79	South Korea
Scoring by half: 44–41, 53–38
Pts: Espil 26; Rebs: Pérez 9 Asts: Espil 8		Pts: J. K. Jung 17; Rebs: H. C. Chun 8 Asts: D. H. Kang 8

Atlanta
Referees: Joseph Derosa (USA), Zhu Jiazhong (CHN)

30 July 1996
17:00

Report

Puerto Rico	76–67	Angola
Scoring by half: 38–36, 38–31
Pts: Ortiz 19; Rebs: Rivas 7 Asts: Alicea 5		Pts: Moreira 15; Rebs: Dias 11; Asts: Moreira 6

Atlanta
Referees: Roman Ryzhyk (UKR), Jose Reyes Ronfini (MEX)

==== 11th–12th ====
2 August 1996
10:00

Report

South Korea	61–99	Angola
Scoring by half: 33–48, 28–51
Pts: D. H. Kang 17; Rebs: H. C. Chun 5 Asts: S. M. Lee, D. H. Kang 6		Pts: Dias 27; Rebs: Dias 11; Asts: Moreira 5

Atlanta
Referees: Jose Reyes Ronfini (MEX), Juan Brea Diaz (CUB)

==== 9th–10th ====
2 August 1996
12:00

Report

Argentina	87–77	Puerto Rico
Scoring by half: 43–38, 44–39
Pts: Espil, Osella 17; Rebs: Milanesio, Oberto 7 Asts: Milanesio, Espil 7		Pts: Ortiz 21; Rebs: Ortiz 11; Asts: Travieso 5

Atlanta
Referees: Davorin Nakic (CRO), Antonio Soares De Campos (ANG)

=== Placement Matches (5–8th Place) ===
1 August 1996
10:00

Report

China	75–115	Greece
Scoring by half: 24–50, 51–65
Pts: Wu 20; Rebs: Liu 8 Asts: Li 7		Pts: Fasoulas 19; Rebs: Christodoulou 12; Asts: Christodoulou 8

Atlanta
Referees: Joseph Derosa (USA), Tomislav Jovancic (YUG)

1 August 1996
12:00

Report

Brazil	80–74	Croatia
Scoring by half: 39–27, 41–47
Pts: Schmidt 32; Rebs: dos Santos, Janjao 7 Asts: Ratto 7		Pts: Tabak 18; Rebs: Tabak 8 Asts: Kukoč 5

Atlanta
Referees: Romualdas Brazauskas (LTU), Jose Reyes Ronfini (MEX)

==== 7th–8th ====
2 August 1996
20:00

Report

China	85–99	Croatia
Scoring by half: 39–49, 46–50
Pts: Hu 22; Rebs: Gong 9 Asts: Li, Sun 5		Pts: Kukoč 26; Rebs: Kukoč 10; Asts: Kukoč 8

Atlanta
Referees: Robert Barnett (AUS), Raul Chaves Sagel (ARG)

==== 5th–6th ====
2 August 1996
22:00

Report

Greece	91–72	Brazil
Scoring by half: 45–49, 46–23
Pts: Sigalas 35; Rebs: Fasoulas, Christodoulou 7 Asts: Patavoukas 7		Pts: Minuci 23; Rebs: Vianna 11; Asts: Ratto 7

Atlanta
Referees: Roman Ryzhyk (UKR), Juan Figueroa (PUR)

== Semifinals ==
1 August 1996
20:00

Report

FR Yugoslavia	66–58	Lithuania
Scoring by half: 35–31, 31–27
Pts: Danilović 19; Rebs: Divac 8 Asts: Bodiroga 4		Pts: Kurtinaitis 22; Rebs: Sabonis 13; Asts: Marčiulionis 6

Atlanta
Referees: Wieslaw Zych (POL), Jose Lapaix Guance (DOM)

1 August 1996
22:00

Report

United States	101–73	Australia
Scoring by half: 51–41, 50–32
Pts: Barkley 24; Rebs: Barkley 11; Asts: Pippen 5		Pts: Gaze 25; Rebs: Bradtke 11; Asts: Heal 5

Atlanta
Referees: Raul Chaves Sagel (ARG), Stylianos Koukoulekidis (GRE)

== Finals ==
=== Bronze Medal match ===
3 August 1996
20:00

Report

Lithuania	80–74	Australia
Scoring by half: 36–34, 44–40
Pts: Sabonis 30; Rebs: Sabonis 13; Asts: Marčiulionis 9		Pts: Gaze 25; Rebs: Bradtke 5 Asts: Heal 5

Atlanta
Referees: Joseph Derosa (USA), Juan Figueroa (PUR)

=== Gold Medal match ===
3 August 1996
22:00

Report

FR Yugoslavia	69–95	United States
Scoring by half: 38–43, 31–52
Pts: Paspalj 19; Rebs: Bodiroga, Đorđević 5 Asts: Đorđević 6		Pts: Robinson 28; Rebs: Robinson 7 Asts: Stockton 7

Atlanta
Referees: Miguel Betancor León (ESP), José Reyes Ronfini (MEX)

== Awards ==
1996 Olympic Basketball Champions

United States
Eleventh title

== Final standings ==
Rank	Team	Pld	W	L	PF	PA	PD
1st place, gold medalist(s)	United States	8	8	0	816	562	+254
2nd place, silver medalist(s)	FR Yugoslavia	8	7	1	741	578	+163
3rd place, bronze medalist(s)	Lithuania	8	5	3	664	560	+104
4th	Australia	8	5	3	712	690	+22
Eliminated at the quarterfinals
5th	Greece	8	5	3	674	662	+12
6th	Brazil	8	3	5	725	757	-32
7th	Croatia	8	4	4	666	624	+42
8th	China	8	2	6	581	844	-263
Preliminary round 5-6th placers
9th	Argentina	7	4	3	535	552	-17
10th	Puerto Rico	7	2	5	600	619	-19
11th	Angola	7	1	6	446	516	-70
12th	South Korea	7	0	7	562	758	-196

== See also ==
- Women's Tournament
