= Yi Qi =

Yi Qi or Yiqi may refer to:

== People ==
- Yiqi (伊祁; Yīqí), the ancestral name of Emperor Yao, a legendary Chinese ruler
- Chen Yiqi (Chinese: 陈奕齐), Taiwanese politician
- Guo Yiqi (born 1997), Chinese fencer
- Yiqi Luo (Chinese: 骆亦其), ecologist at Cornell University
- Mei Yiqi (Chinese: 梅貽琦; 1889–1962), Chinese politician, physicist, and academic administrator
- Pu Yiqi (born 1981), Chinese swimmer
- Zhang Yiqi, Chinese snowboard cross participant at the 2022 Winter Paralympics

== Other uses ==
- Yi (dinosaur), a monotypic genus whose sole species is Yi qi
- Yiqi, Anhui, town in Huangshan, Anhui, China
- FAW Group Corporation, Chinese automobile manufacturer, also known in Chinese as Yi Qi (一汽; Yī Qì)
