= Yury Rodnov =

Kazakhstani sports shooter

Personal information
- Nationality: Kazakhstani
- Born: 18 January 1961 (age 65)

Sport
- Sport: Sports shooting

Yury Rodnov (Юрий Александрович Роднов, born 18 January 1961) is a Kazakhstani sports shooter. He competed in the men's 10 metre running target event at the 1996 Summer Olympics.
