= Yevhen Hekht =

Ukrainian sports shooter

Personal information
- Nationality: Ukrainian
- Born: 17 July 1966 (age 58)

Sport
- Sport: Sports shooting

Yevhen Hekht (born 17 July 1966) is a Ukrainian sports shooter. He competed in the men's 10 metre running target event at the 1996 Summer Olympics.
