= Tamás Burkus =

Hungarian sports shooter

Personal information
- Nationality: Hungarian
- Born: 14 November 1972; Budapest, Hungary
- Died: 11 May 1999 (aged 26); Budapest, Hungary

Sport
- Sport: Sports shooting

Tamás Burkus (14 November 1972 – 11 May 1999) was a Hungarian sports shooter. He competed in the men's 10 metre running target event at the 1996 Summer Olympics.
