= Károly Németh (table tennis) =

Hungarian table tennis player

Personal information
- Nationality: Hungarian
- Born: 31 August 1970 (age 54); Budapest, Hungary

Sport
- Sport: Table tennis

Károly Németh (born 31 August 1970) is a Hungarian table tennis player. He placed 17th in the men's singles event at the 1996 Summer Olympics.
