= André Luís Guimarães Fonseca =

Brazilian basketball player (born 1969)

Personal information
- Born: 4 March 1969 (age 56); Salvador, Brazil
- Listed height: 5 ft 11.25 in (1.81 m)
- Listed weight: 190 lb (86 kg)
- Position: Point guard

Career highlights
- 2× Brazilian champion (2005, 2007)

André Luís Guimarães Fonseca (born 4 March 1969), also commonly known as Ratto, is a Brazilian former professional basketball player and coach.

== Career ==
With the senior Brazilian national basketball team, Ratto He at the 1994 FIBA World Cup, the 1996 Summer Olympics, and the 1998 FIBA World Cup. After his basketball playing career ended, Ratto began a career working as a basketball coach.
