= Yury Yermolenko =

Russian sports shooter

Personal information
- Nationality: Russian
- Born: 13 April 1967 (age 57); Belgorod, Russia

Sport
- Sport: Sports shooting

Yury Yermolenko (born 13 April 1967) is a Russian sports shooter. He competed in the men's 10 metre running target event at the 1996 Summer Olympics.
