= Jana Dobešová =

Czech table tennis player

Personal information
- Nationality: Czech
- Born: 6 August 1968 (age 57) Přerov, Czechoslovakia

Sport
- Sport: Table tennis

Jana Dobešová (born 6 August 1968) is a Czech table tennis player. She competed in the women's singles event at the 1996 Summer Olympics.
