= Shooting at the 1996 Summer Olympics – Men's 10 metre running target =

Sports shooting at the Olympics

Men's 10 metre running target at the Games of the XXVI Olympiad
- Venue: Wolf Creek Shooting Complex
- Date: 26 July 1996
- Competitors: 20 from 14 nations
- Winning score: 685.8 (OR)

Medalists
1st place, gold medalist(s)		Yang Ling	China
2nd place, silver medalist(s)		Xiao Jun	China
3rd place, bronze medalist(s)		Miroslav Januš	Czech Republic

Men's 10 metre running target was one of the fifteen shooting events at the 1996 Summer Olympics. Yang Ling won, setting two new Olympic records.

== Qualification round ==
Rank	Athlete	Country	Slow	Fast	Total	Notes
1	Yang Ling	China	294	291	585	Q OR
2	Dimitri Lykin	Russia	298	283	581	Q
3	Miroslav Januš	Czech Republic	292	288	580	Q
4	Jozsef Sike	Hungary	293	286	579	Q
5	Krister Holmberg	Finland	294	284	578	Q
6	Xiao Jun	China	289	288	577	Q
7	Jens Zimmermann	Germany	290	284	574	Q
8	Attila Solti	Guatemala	286	284	570	Q
9	Yury Yermolenko	Russia	287	282	569	
9	Oleg Moldovan	Moldova	284	285	569	
11	Michael Jakosits	Germany	286	282	568	
12	Yury Rodnov	Kazakhstan	290	277	567	
13	Luboš Račanský	Czech Republic	287	278	565	
14	Tamás Burkus	Hungary	285	279	564	
15	Ghennadi Avramenko	Ukraine	287	276	563	
15	Yevhen Hekht	Ukraine	282	281	563	
17	Carlo Colombo	Italy	288	274	562	
18	Kim Man-chol	North Korea	286	274	560	
18	Bryan Wilson	Australia	283	277	560	
20	Adam Saathoff	United States	276	279	555	

OR Olympic record – Q Qualified for final

== Final ==
Rank	Athlete	Qual	Final	Total	Notes
1st place, gold medalist(s)	Yang Ling (CHN)	585	100.8	685.8	OR
2nd place, silver medalist(s)	Xiao Jun (CHN)	577	102.8	679.8	
3rd place, bronze medalist(s)	Miroslav Januš (CZE)	580	98.4	678.4	
4	Jozsef Sike (HUN)	579	98.1	677.1	
5	Dimitri Lykin (RUS)	581	95.7	676.7	
6	Krister Holmberg (FIN)	578	94.4	672.4	
7	Jens Zimmermann (GER)	574	98.2	672.2	
8	Attila Solti (GUA)	570	97.0	667.0	

OR Olympic record

== Sources ==
- Olympic Report Atlanta 1996 Volume III: The Competition Results (PDF).
