= June Kyakobye =

Ugandan table tennis player

Personal information
- Nationality: Ugandan
- Born: 25 June 1967 (age 58)

Sport
- Sport: Table tennis

Nadunga "June" Kyakobye (born 25 June 1967) is a Ugandan table tennis player. She competed in the women's singles event at the 1996 Summer Olympics.

In Atlanta 1996, June Kyakobye partnered with Mary Musoke for the doubles but lost all pool matches to Taiwanese, South Korean and Romanian pairings.

In 2000, June won the Celtel Open Table Tennis championship that took place at Lugogo Indoor Stadium.
