= Ali Kavuma =

Ugandan weightlifter

The Most Reverend Erica Sabiti
- Archbishop of Uganda, Rwanda, Burundi, and Boga-Zaire
- Church: Anglican Communion
- Province: Church of Uganda
- Diocese: Kampala (Archbishop & Bishop)
- In office: 1966–1974
- Predecessor: Leslie Brown
- Successor: Janani Luwum
- Previous posts: Bishop of Rwenzori (1960–1972); Dean

Orders
- Ordination: Deacon, 1933; Priest, 1934
- Consecration: 1960 (Bishop of Rwenzori)

Personal details
- Born: c. 1903–1908 Nkore (later Ankole), Uganda
- Died: 15 May 1988 Kinoni, Uganda
- Denomination: Anglicanism
- Spouse: Georgina Kachandra (m. 1925; d. 1925), Geraldine (m. 1930)
- Children: 7
- Education: King's College Budo; Makerere College; Bishop Tucker Theological College

Ali Kavuma (born 30 May 1967) is a Ugandan weightlifter. He competed at the 1988 Summer Olympics and the 1996 Summer Olympics.
