= Table tennis at the 1996 Summer Olympics – Men's singles =

Table tennis at the Olympics

Table tennis – Men's singles at the Games of the XXVI Olympiad
- Venue: Georgia World Congress Center
- Date: 25 July to 1 August 1996
- Competitors: 64 from 39 nations

Medalists
| 1st place, gold medalist(s) | | Liu Guoliang | China |
| 2nd place, silver medalist(s) | | Wang Tao | China |
| 3rd place, bronze medalist(s) | | Jörg Roßkopf | Germany |

These are the results of the men's singles competition, one of two events for male competitors in table tennis at the 1996 Summer Olympics in Atlanta.

== Group stage ==
=== Group A ===
| Rank | Athlete | W | L | GW | GL | PW | PL | CHN | TPE | JPN | SUD |
|---|---|---|---|---|---|---|---|---|---|---|---|
| 1 | Kong Linghui (CHN) | 3 | 0 | 6 | 0 | 126 | 75 | X | 2–0 | 2–0 | 2–0 |
| 2 | Chiang Peng-lung (TPE) | 2 | 1 | 4 | 2 | 118 | 89 | 0–2 | X | 2–0 | 2–0 |
| 3 | Toshio Tasaki (JPN) | 1 | 2 | 2 | 4 | 96 | 107 | 0–2 | 0–2 | X | 2–0 |
| 4 | Ahmed Mohamed Osama (SUD) | 0 | 3 | 0 | 6 | 57 | 126 | 0–2 | 0–2 | 0–2 | X |

=== Group B ===
| Rank | Athlete | W | L | GW | GL | PW | PL | CHN | GRE | NED | UGA |
|---|---|---|---|---|---|---|---|---|---|---|---|
| 1 | Wang Tao (CHN) | 3 | 0 | 6 | 1 | 148 | 111 | X | 2–0 | 2–1 | 2–0 |
| 2 | Ntaniel Tsiokas (GRE) | 2 | 1 | 4 | 2 | 114 | 98 | 0–2 | X | 2–0 | 2–0 |
| 3 | Danny Heister (NED) | 1 | 2 | 3 | 4 | 129 | 120 | 1–2 | 0–2 | X | 2–0 |
| 4 | Paul Mutambuze (UGA) | 0 | 3 | 0 | 6 | 64 | 126 | 0–2 | 0–2 | 0–2 | X |

=== Group C ===
| Rank | Athlete | W | L | GW | GL | PW | PL | BEL | ROU | GER | KUW |
|---|---|---|---|---|---|---|---|---|---|---|---|
| 1 | Jean-Michel Saive (BEL) | 3 | 0 | 6 | 0 | 126 | 94 | X | 2–0 | 2–0 | 2–0 |
| 2 | Vasile Florea (ROU) | 2 | 1 | 4 | 2 | 121 | 93 | 0–2 | X | 2–0 | 2–0 |
| 3 | Peter Franz (GER) | 1 | 2 | 2 | 4 | 107 | 102 | 0–2 | 0–2 | X | 2–0 |
| 4 | Dukhail Al-Habashi (KUW) | 0 | 3 | 0 | 6 | 61 | 126 | 0–2 | 0–2 | 0–2 | X |

=== Group D ===
| Rank | Athlete | W | L | GW | GL | PW | PL | SWE | SCG | KOR | GHA |
|---|---|---|---|---|---|---|---|---|---|---|---|
| 1 | Jan-Ove Waldner (SWE) | 3 | 0 | 6 | 0 | 126 | 85 | X | 2–0 | 2–0 | 2–0 |
| 2 | Lee Chul-Seung (KOR) | 2 | 1 | 4 | 4 | 148 | 145 | 0–2 | 2-1 | X | 2–1 |
| 3 | Ilija Lupulesku (SCG) | 1 | 2 | 3 | 4 | 132 | 123 | 0–2 | X | 1-2 | 2–0 |
| 4 | Isaac Opoku (GHA) | 0 | 3 | 1 | 6 | 88 | 141 | 0–2 | 0–2 | 1–2 | X |

=== Group E ===
| Rank | Athlete | W | L | GW | GL | PW | PL | GER | JPN | HKG | MEX |
|---|---|---|---|---|---|---|---|---|---|---|---|
| 1 | Jörg Roßkopf (GER) | 3 | 0 | 6 | 0 | 126 | 81 | X | 2–0 | 2–0 | 2–0 |
| 2 | Hiroshi Shibutani (JPN) | 2 | 1 | 4 | 2 | 111 | 98 | 0–2 | X | 2–0 | 2–0 |
| 3 | Lo Chuen Tsung (HKG) | 1 | 2 | 2 | 4 | 99 | 112 | 0–2 | 0–2 | X | 2–0 |
| 4 | Guillermo Muñoz (MEX) | 0 | 3 | 0 | 6 | 81 | 126 | 0–2 | 0–2 | 0–2 | X |

=== Group F ===
| Rank | Athlete | W | L | GW | GL | PW | PL | CHN | SCG | BEL | AUS |
|---|---|---|---|---|---|---|---|---|---|---|---|
| 1 | Liu Guoliang (CHN) | 3 | 0 | 6 | 1 | 147 | 100 | X | 2–1 | 2–0 | 2–0 |
| 2 | Slobodan Grujić (SCG) | 2 | 1 | 5 | 4 | 162 | 163 | 1–2 | X | 2–1 | 2–1 |
| 3 | Philippe Saive (BEL) | 1 | 2 | 3 | 4 | 133 | 125 | 0–2 | 1–2 | X | 2–0 |
| 4 | Mark Smythe (AUS) | 0 | 3 | 1 | 6 | 88 | 142 | 0–2 | 1–2 | 0–2 | X |

=== Group G ===
| Rank | Athlete | W | L | GW | GL | PW | PL | CZE | FRA | PRK | CHI |
|---|---|---|---|---|---|---|---|---|---|---|---|
| 1 | Petr Korbel (CZE) | 3 | 0 | 6 | 1 | 141 | 102 | X | 2–0 | 2–1 | 2–0 |
| 2 | Jean-Philippe Gatien (FRA) | 2 | 1 | 4 | 2 | 116 | 75 | 0–2 | X | 2–0 | 2–0 |
| 3 | Choi Kyong-Sob (PRK) | 1 | 2 | 3 | 4 | 115 | 131 | 1–2 | 0–2 | X | 2–0 |
| 4 | Augusto Morales (CHI) | 0 | 3 | 0 | 6 | 62 | 126 | 0–2 | 0–2 | 0–2 | X |

=== Group H ===
| Rank | Athlete | W | L | GW | GL | PW | PL | BLR | RUS | GBR | JAM |
|---|---|---|---|---|---|---|---|---|---|---|---|
| 1 | Vladimir Samsonov (BLR) | 3 | 0 | 6 | 1 | 143 | 74 | X | 2–1 | 2–0 | 2–0 |
| 2 | Andrei Mazunov (RUS) | 2 | 1 | 5 | 3 | 147 | 143 | 1–2 | X | 2–1 | 2–0 |
| 3 | Carl Prean (GBR) | 1 | 2 | 3 | 4 | 110 | 117 | 0–2 | 1–2 | X | 2–0 |
| 4 | Stephen Hylton (JAM) | 0 | 3 | 0 | 6 | 60 | 126 | 0–2 | 0–2 | 0–2 | X |

=== Group I ===
| Rank | Athlete | W | L | GW | GL | PW | PL | KOR | HUN | AUT | AUS |
|---|---|---|---|---|---|---|---|---|---|---|---|
| 1 | Kim Taek-Soo (KOR) | 3 | 0 | 6 | 0 | 127 | 80 | X | 2–0 | 2–0 | 2–0 |
| 2 | Károly Németh (HUN) | 2 | 1 | 4 | 3 | 123 | 122 | 0–2 | X | 2–1 | 2–0 |
| 3 | Ding Yi (AUT) | 1 | 2 | 3 | 5 | 148 | 147 | 0–2 | 1–2 | X | 2–1 |
| 4 | Paul Langley (AUS) | 0 | 3 | 1 | 6 | 93 | 142 | 0–2 | 0–2 | 1–2 | X |

=== Group J ===
| Rank | Athlete | W | L | GW | GL | PW | PL | CRO | AUT | HUN | QAT |
|---|---|---|---|---|---|---|---|---|---|---|---|
| 1 | Zoran Primorac (CRO) | 3 | 0 | 6 | 1 | 143 | 95 | X | 2–0 | 2–1 | 2–0 |
| 2 | Werner Schlager (AUT) | 2 | 1 | 4 | 2 | 118 | 99 | 0–2 | X | 2–0 | 2–0 |
| 3 | Zoltán Bátorfi (HUN) | 1 | 2 | 3 | 4 | 122 | 123 | 1–2 | 0–2 | X | 2–0 |
| 4 | Hamad Al-Hammadi (QAT) | 0 | 3 | 0 | 6 | 60 | 126 | 0–2 | 0–2 | 0–2 | X |

=== Group K ===
| Rank | Athlete | W | L | GW | GL | PW | PL | BRA | SWE | PRK | TRI |
|---|---|---|---|---|---|---|---|---|---|---|---|
| 1 | Hugo Hoyama (BRA) | 3 | 0 | 6 | 1 | 151 | 131 | X | 2–1 | 2–0 | 2–0 |
| 2 | Jörgen Persson (SWE) | 2 | 1 | 5 | 2 | 135 | 115 | 1–2 | X | 2–0 | 2–0 |
| 3 | Kim Song-hui (PRK) | 1 | 2 | 2 | 4 | 121 | 116 | 0–2 | 0–2 | X | 2–0 |
| 4 | Dexter St. Louis (TRI) | 0 | 3 | 0 | 6 | 82 | 127 | 0–2 | 0–2 | 0–2 | X |

=== Group L ===
| Rank | Athlete | W | L | GW | GL | PW | PL | RUS | SWE | USA | BIH |
|---|---|---|---|---|---|---|---|---|---|---|---|
| 1 | Dmitry Mazunov (RUS) | 3 | 0 | 6 | 0 | 128 | 95 | X | 2–0 | 2–0 | 2–0 |
| 2 | Peter Karlsson (SWE) | 2 | 1 | 4 | 3 | 123 | 124 | 0–2 | X | 2–1 | 2–0 |
| 3 | Jim Butler (USA) | 1 | 2 | 3 | 4 | 133 | 136 | 0–2 | 1–2 | X | 2–0 |
| 4 | Tarik Hodžić (BIH) | 0 | 3 | 0 | 6 | 97 | 126 | 0–2 | 0–2 | 0–2 | X |

=== Group M ===
| Rank | Athlete | W | L | GW | GL | PW | PL | CAN | GBR | USA | NGR |
|---|---|---|---|---|---|---|---|---|---|---|---|
| 1 | Johnny Huang (CAN) | 3 | 0 | 6 | 0 | 126 | 76 | X | 2–0 | 2–0 | 2–0 |
| 2 | Chen Xinhua (GBR) | 2 | 1 | 4 | 4 | 142 | 145 | 0–2 | X | 2–1 | 2–1 |
| 3 | David Zhuang (USA) | 1 | 2 | 3 | 4 | 122 | 126 | 0–2 | 1–2 | X | 2–0 |
| 4 | Sule Olaleye (NGR) | 0 | 3 | 1 | 6 | 102 | 145 | 0–2 | 1–2 | 0–2 | X |

=== Group N ===
| Rank | Athlete | W | L | GW | GL | PW | PL | KOR | PRK | SCG | JAM |
|---|---|---|---|---|---|---|---|---|---|---|---|
| 1 | Yoo Nam-Kyu (KOR) | 3 | 0 | 6 | 1 | 126 | 85 | X | 2–0 | 2–1 | 2–0 |
| 2 | Ri Gun-sang (PRK) | 2 | 1 | 4 | 2 | 134 | 116 | 0–2 | X | 2–0 | 2–0 |
| 3 | Aleksandar Karakašević (SCG) | 1 | 2 | 3 | 4 | 120 | 128 | 1–2 | 0–2 | X | 2–0 |
| 4 | Michael Hyatt (JAM) | 0 | 3 | 0 | 6 | 75 | 126 | 0–2 | 0–2 | 0–2 | X |

=== Group O ===
| Rank | Athlete | W | L | GW | GL | PW | PL | JPN | POL | INA | CAN |
|---|---|---|---|---|---|---|---|---|---|---|---|
| 1 | Kōji Matsushita (JPN) | 3 | 0 | 6 | 1 | 143 | 124 | X | 2–1 | 2–0 | 2–0 |
| 2 | Andrzej Grubba (POL) | 2 | 1 | 5 | 2 | 146 | 116 | 1–2 | X | 2–0 | 2–0 |
| 3 | Anton Suseno (INA) | 1 | 2 | 2 | 4 | 100 | 105 | 0–2 | 0–2 | X | 2–0 |
| 4 | Joe Ng (CAN) | 0 | 3 | 0 | 6 | 82 | 126 | 0–2 | 0–2 | 0–2 | X |

=== Group P ===
| Rank | Athlete | W | L | GW | GL | PW | PL | FRA | GRE | NGR | IND |
|---|---|---|---|---|---|---|---|---|---|---|---|
| 1 | Patrick Chila (FRA) | 3 | 0 | 6 | 2 | 158 | 120 | X | 2–1 | 2–0 | 2–1 |
| 2 | Kalinikos Kreanga (GRE) | 2 | 1 | 5 | 2 | 133 | 114 | 1–2 | X | 2–0 | 2–0 |
| 3 | Segun Toriola (NGR) | 1 | 2 | 2 | 5 | 98 | 133 | 0–2 | 0–2 | X | 2–1 |
| 4 | Chetan Baboor (IND) | 0 | 3 | 2 | 6 | 132 | 154 | 1–2 | 0–2 | 1–2 | X |

== Knockout stage ==
First round
A1 | Kong Linghui (CHN) | 17 | 18 | 22 | 12
I1 | Kim Taek-Soo (KOR) | 21 | 21 | 20 | 21
P1 | Patrick Chila (FRA) | 16 | 16 | 21
E1 | Jörg Roßkopf (GER) | 21 | 21 | 23
F1 | Liu Guoliang (CHN) | 21 | 21 | 21
O1 | Koji Matsushita (JPN) | 18 | 10 | 17
M1 | Johnny Huang (CAN) | 21 | 17 | 21 | 21
D1 | Jan-Ove Waldner (SWE) | 15 | 21 | 16 | 17
C1 | Jean-Michel Saive (BEL) | 21 | 21 | 21
J1 | Zoran Primorac (CRO) | 13 | 16 | 8
K1 | Hugo Hoyama (BRA) | 21 | 21 | 17 | 14 | 13
G1 | Petr Korbel (CZE) | 17 | 19 | 21 | 21 | 21
H1 | Vladimir Samsonov (BLR) | 21 | 21 | 21
L1 | Dmitry Mazunov (RUS) | 14 | 15 | 13
N1 | Yoo Nam-Kyu (KOR) | 15 | 16 | 9
B1 | Wang Tao (CHN) | 21 | 21 | 21

Quarterfinals
I1 | Kim Taek-Soo (KOR) | 21 | 24 | 12 | 21 | 24
E1 | Jörg Roßkopf (GER) | 12 | 26 | 21 | 16 | 26
F1 | Liu Guoliang (CHN) | 9 | 21 | 21 | 21
M1 | Johnny Huang (CAN) | 21 | 19 | 16 | 16
C1 | Jean-Michel Saive (BEL) | 10 | 13 | 19
G1 | Petr Korbel (CZE) | 21 | 21 | 21
H1 | Vladimir Samsonov (BLR) | 21 | 21 | 10 | 15 | 15
B1 | Wang Tao (CHN) | 16 | 16 | 21 | 21 | 21

Semifinals
E1 | Jörg Roßkopf (GER) | 17 | 21 | 18 | 18
F1 | Liu Guoliang (CHN) | 21 | 18 | 21 | 21
G1 | Petr Korbel (CZE) | 21 | 7 | 16
B1 | Wang Tao (CHN) | 23 | 21 | 21

Gold medal match
F1 | Liu Guoliang (CHN) | 21 | 22 | 21 | 15 | 21
B1 | Wang Tao (CHN) | 12 | 24 | 19 | 21 | 6
Bronze medal match
E1 | Jörg Roßkopf (GER) | 21 | 19 | 21 | 21
G1 | Petr Korbel (CZE) | 17 | 21 | 18 | 19
