= Bryan Wilson (sport shooter) =

Australian sport shooter (born 1962)

Personal information
- Full name: Bryan Kenneth Wilson
- Nationality: Australia
- Born: 26 September 1962 (age 64) Melbourne, Australia
- Height: 1.83 m (6 ft 0 in)
- Weight: 100 kg (220 lb)

Sport
- Sport: Shooting
- Events: 10 m running target (10RT); 50 m running target (50RT)
- Club: Sporting Shooters Association
Medal record
Men's shooting
Representing Australia
Commonwealth Games
Gold medal – first place	1994 Victoria	10RT

Bryan Kenneth Wilson (born 26 September 1962 in Melbourne) is an Australian sport shooter. He has competed for Australia in running target shooting at four Olympics (1984, 1988, 1996, and 2004), and has produced a phenomenal record of eleven medals in a major international competition: spanning the Commonwealth Games and the Oceanian Championships. Wilson is a full-fledged member of the Sporting Shooters Association of Australia.

== Career ==
Wilson made his first ever Australian team at the 1984 Summer Olympics in Los Angeles, finishing seventeenth in the 50 m running target with a score of 564 points.

In 1988, Wilson won his first ever gold medal at the Oceanian Championships that culminated in his selection to the Australian team at his succeeding Games in Seoul 1988, but slumped to a distant twenty-second in a 23-shooter field of his pet event after faring poorly with 282 on the fast run, posting a qualifying score of 573.

Despite missing his 1992 Olympic bid, Wilson cracked a new meet record of 657.9 to successfully claim his first and only short-distance running target title at the 1994 Commonwealth Games in Victoria, British Columbia, Canada, mounting a charge in the final with a superb 1.9-point lead over the crowd favourite Mark Bedlington. On his third Olympic appearance in Atlanta two years later, Wilson tied for eighteenth with North Korea's Kim Man-chol in the 10 m running target, outwitting the young US shooter Adam Saathoff, who finished dead last in the field, by five points.

Although Wilson was not selected to the Australian squad in Sydney 2000, he had capped off a remarkable eight-year comeback for his fourth Games by beating Adam Gitsman at the national trials to fill in the Olympic quota place for his country that the latter had won from the Oceanian Championships a year earlier. At the 2004 Summer Olympics in Athens, Wilson marked 275 on the slow and a 269 on the fast run to round out the 19-shooter field of the men's 10 m running target in last place, finishing with a total score of 544 points.

== Olympic results ==
Event	1984	1988	1996	2004
50-metre running target	17th 564	21st 573	Not held	
10 metre running target	Not held		18th 560	19th 544
