= Tarik Hodžić (table tennis) =

Bosnian table tennis player

Personal information
- Nationality: Bosnian
- Born: 16 October 1972 (age 52)

Sport
- Sport: Table tennis

Tarik Hodžić (born 16 October 1972) is a Bosnian table tennis player. He competed in the men's singles event at the 1996 Summer Olympics.
