= Zhao Guisheng =

Chinese sports shooter

Zhao Guisheng (born 1 January 1961) is a Chinese sport shooter who competed in the 1996 Summer Olympics.
