= Emilia Elena Ciosu =

Romanian table tennis player

Personal information
- Nationality: Romanian
- Born: 7 February 1971 (age 54); Bucharest, Romania

Sport
- Sport: Table tennis

Emilia Elena Ciosu (born 7 February 1971) is a Romanian table tennis player. She competed at the 1992 Summer Olympics and the 1996 Summer Olympics.
