= Yu Hongqi =

Chinese footballer

Yu Honggi
Personal information
- Date of birth: 2 February 1973 (age 53)
- Position: Defender

International career^{‡}
Years	Team	Apps	(Gls)
- China
Medal record
Women's football
Representing China
Olympic Games
Silver medal – second place	1996 Atlanta	Team
Asian Games
Gold medal – first place	1994 Hiroshima	Team
- ‡ National team caps and goals as of 5 June 1995 (before the 1995 FIFA Women's World Cup)

Yu Hongqi (Chinese: 于红旗, born 2 February 1973) is a female Chinese football (soccer) player who competed in the 1996 Summer Olympics.

In 1996 she won the silver medal with the Chinese team. She played four matches.
