= Liang Xin =

Chinese basketball player (born 1975)

Personal information
- Nationality: Chinese
- Born: 7 March 1975 (age 50); Beijing, China

Sport
- Sport: Basketball

Liang Xin (Chinese: 梁馨; pinyin: Liáng Xīn; born 7 March 1975) is a Chinese basketball player. She competed in the women's tournament at the 1996 Summer Olympics.
