= Dai-Yong Tu =

Swiss table tennis player

Tu Dai Yong or Dai-Yong Tu (born 17 January 1968), born Dai Yong (Chinese: 戴勇; pinyin: Dài Yǒng), is a Chinese-born table tennis player who represented Switzerland at the 1996 Summer Olympics.

== Sources ==
- "Dai-Yong Tu Bio, Stats, and Results". Sports Reference. Archived from the original on 2020-04-18.
