= Chen Xuan =

Chinese synchronized swimmer

Personal information
- Born: February 10, 1978 (age 48) Changsha, Hunan, China

Sport
- Sport: Synchronised swimming

Chen Xuan (Chinese: 陈绚, born 10 February 1978) is a Chinese former synchronized swimmer who competed in the 1996 Summer Olympics.

She is the older sister of swimmer Chen Yanyan.
