= Li Haicong =

Chinese sport shooter (born 1971)

Li Haicong (born 2 February 1971) is a Chinese sport shooter who competed in the 1996 Summer Olympics.
