= Pablo Alicea =

Puerto Rican basketball player

Personal information
- Nationality: Puerto Rican
- Born: 7 July 1963 (age 62) Santurce, Puerto Rico

Sport
- Sport: Basketball

Pablo Alicea (born 7 July 1963) is a Puerto Rican basketball player. He competed in the men's tournament at the 1996 Summer Olympics.

== Professional career ==
Alicea played for four franchises in the Baloncesto Superior Nacional. He began in 1988 with Gigantes de Carolina. After three seasons there he took a break from the league. He returned in 1999 with Cangrejeros de Santurce. He was traded for the 2000 season to Hatillo (now defunct). He took another break before returning to play with his final team, Capitanes de Arecibo, in 2004–2005. He retired from professional basketball at the conclusion of the 2005 season. Alicea was a police officer in the Puerto Rico Police Department, then in 2007 he went on to join the Baltimore Police Department.
