= Paul Mutambuze =

Ugandan table tennis player

Personal information
- Nationality: Ugandan
- Born: 11 November 1964 (age 61)

Sport
- Sport: Table tennis

Paul Mutambuze (born 11 November 1964) is a Ugandan table tennis player. He competed in the men's singles event at the 1996 Summer Olympics.
