= Chen Dongjie =

Chinese sport shooter (born 1970)

Chen Dongjie (born 18 April 1970) is a Chinese sport shooter who competed in the 1996 Summer Olympics.
