= Pan Yan =

Chinese synchronized swimmer

Personal information
- Born: September 22, 1973 (age 52) Tianjin, China

Sport
- Sport: Synchronised swimming

Pan Yan (Chinese: 潘岩, born 22 September 1973) is a Chinese former synchronized swimmer who competed in the 1996 Summer Olympics.
