= Winifred Addy =

Ghanaian table tennis player

Winfred Addy
Personal information
- Nationality: Ghanaian
- Born: 17 March 1973 (age 52)

Sport
- Sport: Table tennis

Winfred Addy (born 17 March 1973) is a Ghanaian table tennis player. He competed in the 1996 Summer Olympics.
