= Tu Hui-mei =

Taiwanese softball player

Personal information
- Nationality: Taiwanese
- Born: 25 April 1977 (age 48)

Sport
- Sport: Softball

Tu Hui-mei (born 25 April 1977) is a Taiwanese softball player. She competed in the women's tournament at the 1996 Summer Olympics.
