= Yiqi, Anhui =

Yiqi 奕棋镇
- Town
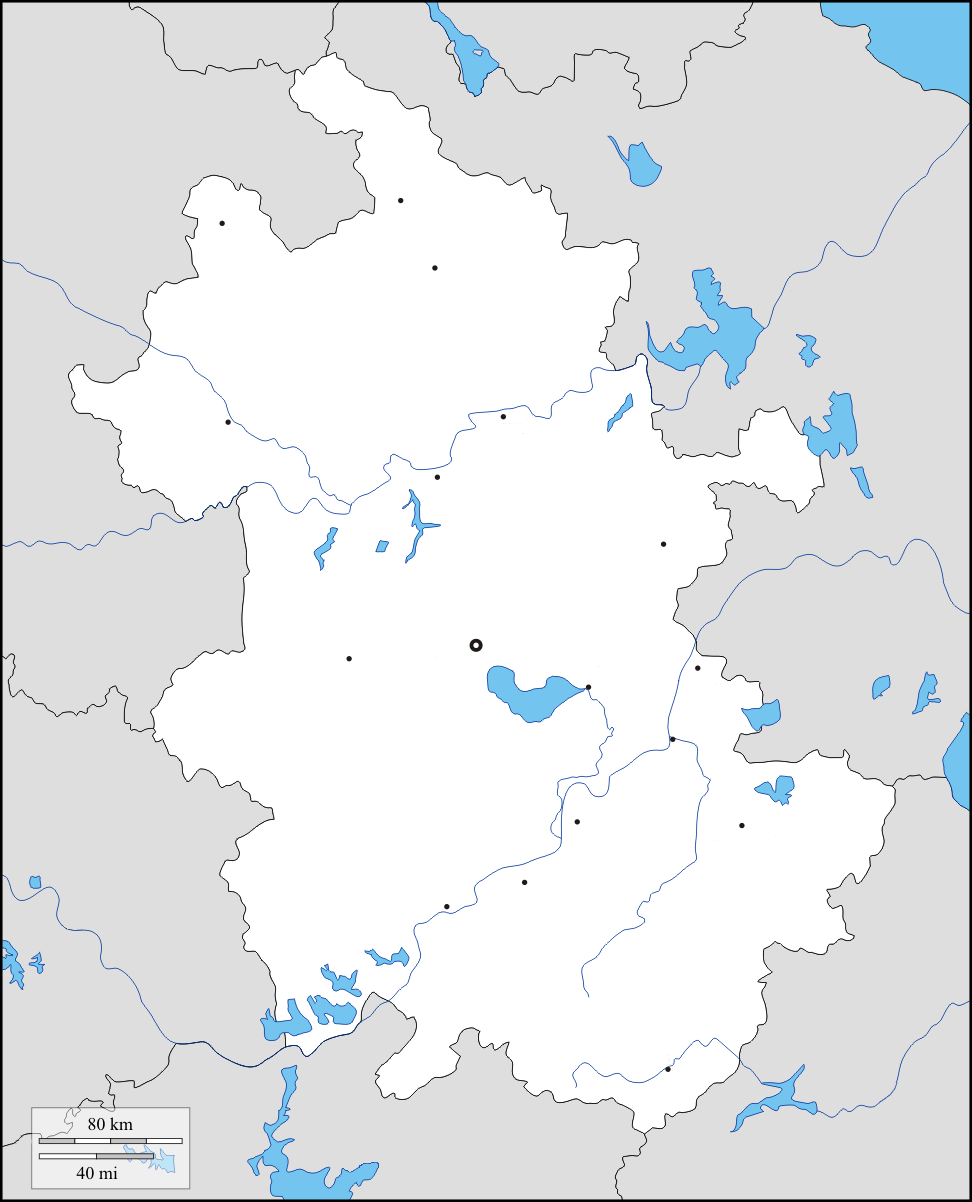
- Location in Anhui
- Coordinates: 29°43′39″N 118°15′28″E
- Country: People's Republic of China
- Province: Anhui
- Prefecture-level city: Huangshan City
- District: Tunxi District
- Time zone: UTC+8 (China Standard)

Yiqi (Chinese: 奕棋; pinyin: Yìqí) is a town under the administration of Tunxi District, Huangshan City, Anhui, China. As of 2023, it administers Longjing Residential Community (龙井社区) and the following nine villages:

- Yiqi Village
- Xu Village (徐村)
- Lintang Village (林塘村)
- Chatang Village (查塘村)
- Bo Village (博村)
- Jiang Village (江村)
- Zhanchuan Village (占川村)
- Yaogan Village (瑶干村)
- Zhu Village (朱村)
