= Xiao Jun (sport shooter) =

Chinese sport shooter (born 1972)

Medal record

Men's shooting

Representing China
Silver medal – second place	1996 Atlanta	10 m running target

Xiao Jun (Chinese: 肖俊; born 31 August 1972) is a male Chinese sport shooter. He competed at the 1996 Atlanta Olympic Games, and won a silver medal in Men's 10 m Running Target.
