= Liu Haimei =

Chinese sailor (born 1971)

Liu Haimei (born 23 January 1971) is a Chinese sailor who competed in the 1996 Summer Olympics.
