= Ma Zongqing =

Chinese basketball player

Personal information
- Nationality: Chinese
- Born: 22 July 1975 (age 49); Heilongjiang, China

Sport
- Sport: Basketball

Ma Zongqing (simplified Chinese: 马宗青; traditional Chinese: 馬宗青; pinyin: Mǎ Zōngqīng; born 22 July 1975) is a Chinese basketball player. She competed in the women's tournament at the 1996 Summer Olympics.
