= Ahmed Mohamed Osama =

Sudanese table tennis player

Personal information
- Nationality: Sudanese
- Born: 17 July 1963 (age 61)

Sport
- Sport: Table tennis

Ahmed Mohamed Osama (born 17 July 1963) is a Sudanese table tennis player. He competed in the men's singles event at the 1996 Summer Olympics.
