= He Liping =

Chinese softball player

Olympic medal record

Women's softball
| Silver medal – second place | 1996 Atlanta | Team |

He Liping (simplified Chinese: 何丽萍; traditional Chinese: 何麗萍; pinyin: Hé Lìpíng; born November 13, 1972) is a female Chinese softball player who competed in the 1996 Summer Olympics.

In 1996 she won the silver medal as part of the Chinese team. She played one game as a pitcher.
