= Chen Xianjun =

Chinese sport shooter (born 1974)

Chen Xianjun (born 14 July 1974) is a Chinese sport shooter who competed in the 1996 Summer Olympics.
