= Guo Cui =

Chinese synchronized swimmer

Personal information
- Born: February 26, 1975 (age 51) Jinan, Shandong, China

Sport
- Sport: Synchronised swimming

Guo Cui (Chinese: 郭毳, born 26 February 1975) is a Chinese former synchronized swimmer who competed in the 1996 Summer Olympics.
