= Zheng Wu =

Chinese basketball player

Zheng Wu 郑武
Personal information
- Born: 7 August 1967 (age 59) Jinhua, Zhejiang, China
- Listed height: 6.46 ft 0 in (1.97 m)

Career information
- Playing career: 1982–2004

Career history

Coaching
- 2004: China U19
- 2004–2008: Zhejiang Golden Bulls (assistant)
- 2010–2013: Zhejiang Golden Bulls Women
- 2013–2015: Anhui Wenyi
- 2017: Anhui Wenyi
- 2018–2019: Wuhan Dangdai
- 2023–2024: Anhui Wenyi
Medals
Men's basketball
Representing China
FIBA Asia Cup
Gold medal – first place	1993 Jakarta
Gold medal – first place	1995 Seoul
Asian Games
Gold medal – first place	1994 Hiroshima
Universiade Games
Bronze medal – third place	1993 Buffalo

Zheng Wu (Chinese: 郑武; born 7 August 1967) is a Chinese former basketball player who competed in the 1996 Summer Olympics and in the 2000 Summer Olympics.
