= Pu Yiqi =

Chinese swimmer

Personal information
- Born: January 25, 1981 (age 45)

Sport
- Sport: Swimming

Pu Yiqi (born 25 January 1981) is a Chinese former swimmer who competed in the 1996 Summer Olympics.
