= Li Xiaoyong =

Chinese basketball player

Li Xiaoyong 李晓勇
Personal information
- Born: 28 November 1969 (age 56) Dandong, Liaoning, China
- Listed height: 6.2 ft 0 in (1.89 m)

Career information
- Playing career: 1988–2006
- Position: Point guard

Career history

Playing
- 1988–2003: Liaoning Flying Leopards
- 2003–2005: Shaanxi Kylins
- 2005–2006: Yunnan Honghe

Coaching
- 2004: China Women (assistant)
- 2010–2011: Liaoning Women
- 2020–2022: Beijing Royal Fighters (assistant)
- 2022: China Men U18
Medals
Men's basketball
Representing China
Asian Games
Gold medal – first place	1998 Bangkok	Team competition

Li Xiaoyong (born 28 November 1969) is a Chinese former basketball player who competed in the 1996 Summer Olympics and in the 2000 Summer Olympics.
