= Mary Musoke =

Ugandan table tennis player

Personal information
- Nationality: Ugandan

Sport
- Sport: Table tennis

Mary Musoke is a Ugandan table tennis player and a three-time Olympian. She competed at the 1992 Summer Olympics in Barcelona, the 1996 Summer Olympics in Atlanta, and the 2000 Summer Olympics that where held in Sydney . She is a legendary character figure in Ugandan table tennis and has transitioned into coaching since her retirement. She won Uganda's first individual bronze medal at the Africa Senior Table Tennis Championship in 2004, she had previously finished fifth in 2002. She participated in three Pan African Games (1991, 1995, and 1999), winning a bronze medal in the 1999 edition.
