= 1987 World Table Tennis Championships =

1987 edition of the World Table Tennis Championships

The 1987 World Table Tennis Championships were held in New Delhi, India from 19 February to 1 March 1987.

== Results ==
=== Team ===
Event	Gold	Silver	Bronze
Swaythling Cup; Men's Team	China; Chen Longcan; Chen Xinhua; Jiang Jialiang; Teng Yi; Wang Hao	Sweden; Mikael Appelgren; Ulf Carlsson; Erik Lindh; Jörgen Persson; Jan-Ove Waldner	North Korea; Chu Jong-Chol; Hong Chol; Kim Song-hui; Li Gun-Sang
Corbillon Cup; Women's Team	China; Chen Jing; Dai Lili; Jiao Zhimin; Li Huifen; He Zhili	South Korea; Baek Soon-Ae; Hong Soon-hwa; Hyun Jung-Hwa; Yang Young-Ja	Hungary; Csilla Bátorfi; Szilvia Káhn; Krisztina Nagy; Edit Urban

=== Individual ===
Event	Gold	Silver	Bronze
Men's singles	(China) Jiang Jialiang	(Sweden) Jan-Ove Waldner	(China) Chen Xinhua
Men's singles	(China) Jiang Jialiang	(Sweden) Jan-Ove Waldner	(China) Teng Yi
Women's singles	(China) He Zhili	(South Korea) Yang Young-Ja	(China) Guan Jianhua
Women's singles	(China) He Zhili	(South Korea) Yang Young-Ja	(China) Dai Lili
Men's doubles	(China) Chen Longcan (China) Wei Qingguang	(Socialist Federal Republic of Yugoslavia) Ilija Lupulesku (Socialist Federal Republic of Yugoslavia) Zoran Primorac	(Poland) Andrzej Grubba (Poland) Leszek Kucharski
Men's doubles	(China) Chen Longcan (China) Wei Qingguang	(Socialist Federal Republic of Yugoslavia) Ilija Lupulesku (Socialist Federal Republic of Yugoslavia) Zoran Primorac	(South Korea) Ahn Jae-Hyung (South Korea) Yoo Nam-Kyu
Women's doubles	(South Korea) Hyun Jung-hwa (South Korea) Yang Young-ja	(China) Dai Lili (China) Li Huifen	(China) He Zhili (China) Jiao Zhimin
Women's doubles	(South Korea) Hyun Jung-hwa (South Korea) Yang Young-ja	(China) Dai Lili (China) Li Huifen	(North Korea) Cho Jung-hui (North Korea) Li Bun-Hui
Mixed doubles	(China) Hui Jun (China) Geng Lijuan	(China) Jiang Jialiang (China) Jiao Zhimin	(China) Wang Hao (China) Guan Jianhua
Mixed doubles	(China) Hui Jun (China) Geng Lijuan	(China) Jiang Jialiang (China) Jiao Zhimin	(South Korea) Ahn Jae-Hyung (South Korea) Yang Young-Ja
