= 1987 World Table Tennis Championships – Mixed doubles =

1987 Mixed doubles

Medalists
gold medal	Hui Jun; Geng Lijuan	China
silver medal	Jiang Jialiang; Jiao Zhimin	China
bronze medal	Wang Hao; Guan Jianhua	China
bronze medal	Ahn Jae-hyung; Yang Young-ja	South Korea

The 1987 World Table Tennis Championships mixed doubles was the 39th edition of the mixed doubles championship.

Hui Jun and Geng Lijuan defeated Jiang Jialiang and Jiao Zhimin in the final by two sets to one.

== Results ==
Round of 16
(Czechoslovakia) Jindřich Panský (Czechoslovakia) Marie Hrachová
(China) Xu Zengcai (China) Chen Zihe
(China) Wang Hao (China) Guan Jianhua
(South Korea) Kim Wan (South Korea) Hong Cha-ok
(China) He Zhiwen (China) He Zhili
(South Korea) Kim Ki-taik (South Korea) Hyun Jung-hwa
(China) Hui Jun (China) Geng Lijuan
(Japan) Yoshihito Miyazaki (Japan) Kiyomi Ishida
(China) Jiang Jialiang (China) Jiao Zhimin	17	22	21
(Czechoslovakia) Milan Grman (Czechoslovakia) Renata Kasalová	21	20	13
(China) Chen Longcan (China) Chen Jing
(South Korea) Yoo Nam-kyu (South Korea) Baek Soon-Ae
(South Korea) Ahn Jae-hyung (South Korea) Yang Young-ja	21	21
(Czechoslovakia) Jiri Javurek (Czechoslovakia) Alena Safarova	14	12
(North Korea) Kim Song-hui (North Korea) Li Bun-hui	21	10	21
(China) Teng Yi (China) Dai Lili	12	21	18

Quarterfinals
(Czechoslovakia) Panský (Czechoslovakia) Hrachová	22	23	20
(China) Wang Hao (China) Guan Jianhua	20	25	22
(China) He Zhiwen (China) He Zhili	18	9
(China) Hui Jun (China) Geng Lijuan	21	21
(China) Jiang Jialiang (China) Jiao Zhimin
(South Korea) Yoo Nam-kyu (South Korea) Baek Soon Ae
(South Korea) Ahn Jae-hyung (South Korea) Yang Young-ja	17	21	21
(North Korea) Kim Song-hui (North Korea) Li Bun-hui	21	16	18

Semifinals
(China) Wang Hao (China) Guan Jianhua	16	20
(China) Hui Jun (China) Geng Lijuan	21	22
(China) Jiang Jialiang (China) Jiao Zhimin	21	18	21
(South Korea) Ahn Jae-hyung (South Korea) Yang Young-ja	15	21	10

Final
(China) Hui Jun (China) Geng Lijuan	21	15	21
(China) Jiang Jialiang (China) Jiao Zhimin	14	21	10

== See also ==
List of World Table Tennis Championships medalists
