= 1987 World Table Tennis Championships – Women's team =

1987 Corbillon Cup (women's team)

The 1987 World Table Tennis Championships – Corbillon Cup (women's team) was the 32nd edition of the women's team championship.

China won the gold medal defeating South Korea in the final 3–0. Hungary won the bronze medal.

== Medalists ==
=== Team ===
Event	Gold	Silver	Bronze
	China; Chen Jing; Dai Lili; Jiao Zhimin; Li Huifen; He Zhili	South Korea; Baek Soon-Ae; Hong Soon-hwa; Hyun Jung-Hwa; Yang Young-Ja	Hungary; Csilla Bátorfi; Szilvia Káhn; Krisztina Nagy; Edit Urban

== Second stage ==
=== Group A ===
Pos	Team	P	W	L	Pts
1	China	3	3	0	3
2	Japan	3	2	1	2
3	Poland	3	1	2	1
4	France	3	0	3	0

=== Group B ===
Pos	Team	P	W	L	Pts
1	North Korea	3	2	1	2
2	(Socialist Federal Republic of Yugoslavia) Yugoslavia	3	2	1	2
3	Czechoslovakia	3	2	1	2
4	England	3	0	3	0

=== Group C ===
Pos	Team	P	W	L	Pts
1	South Korea	3	3	0	3
2	Hungary	3	2	1	2
3	Sweden	3	1	2	1
4	Taiwan	3	0	3	0

=== Group D ===
Pos	Team	P	W	L	Pts
1	Soviet Union	3	3	0	3
2	Netherlands	3	2	1	2
3	Hong Kong	3	1	2	1
4	West Germany	3	0	3	0

== Quarter finals ==
Team One	Team Two	Score
Hungary	Soviet Union	3–0
China	Yugoslavia	3–1
Netherlands	North Korea	3–1
South Korea	Japan	3–0

== Semifinals ==
Team One	Team Two	Score
South Korea	Netherlands	3–0
China	Hungary	3–0

== Third-place playoff ==
Team One	Team Two	Score
Hungary	Netherlands	3-1

== Final ==
China 3		South Korea 0	Score
Dai Lili	bt	Yang Young-Ja	23–21 21–17
Jiao Zhimin	bt	Hyun Jung-Hwa	18–21 21–9 21–13
Dai Lili & Li Huifen	bt	Yang Young-Ja & Hyun Jung-Hwa	21–16 21–15

== See also ==
List of World Table Tennis Championships medalists
