= Euro-Asia Cup =

Table tennis competition

2010 Euro-Asia Cup logo.

The Euro-Asia Cup, more recently known as the Asia-Euro Cup or Asia-Europe All Stars Challenge, is a table tennis team competition currently held annually in China between teams of professional players representing Asia and Europe.

== History ==
First held in 1986 to 1989 with singles and team events, then re-held in 2009 with only team events, in 2009 to 2013 the competition featured two events each year: one held in China and the other held in a European city. Since 2013, there has just been one event held annually in China, currently organised by the Chinese Table Tennis Association.

Asia has won the competition nine times, compared to Europe's three wins. The European team's first two wins came in Turkey and France, and in 2015 they earned their first competition win on Asian soil, with victory in Zhangjiagang.

== Winners ==
=== Individual events (1986–1989) ===
==== Men's singles ====
Year	Gold	Silver	Bronze
1986	(Poland) Andrzej Grubba	(Czechoslovakia) Jindřich Panský	(China) Chen Longcan
1986	(Poland) Andrzej Grubba	(Czechoslovakia) Jindřich Panský	(Poland) Leszek Kucharski
1987	(China) Chen Longcan	(China) Jiang Jialiang	(Japan) Yoshihito Miyazaki
1987	(China) Chen Longcan	(China) Jiang Jialiang	(Sweden) Jan-Ove Waldner
1988	(Sweden) Jan-Ove Waldner	(South Korea) Yoo Nam-kyu	(North Korea) Ri Gun-sang
1988	(Sweden) Jan-Ove Waldner	(South Korea) Yoo Nam-kyu	(China) Teng Yi
1989	(South Korea) Kim Taek-soo	(South Korea) Kim Ki-taik	(Poland) Andrzej Grubba

==== Women's singles ====
Year	Gold	Silver	Bronze
1986	(China) Jiao Zhimin	(China) Dai Lili	(China) Geng Lijuan
1986	(China) Jiao Zhimin	(China) Dai Lili	(Netherlands) Bettine Vriesekoop
1987	(China) Dai Lili	(China) Jiao Zhimin	(North Korea) Li Bun-hui
1987	(China) Dai Lili	(China) Jiao Zhimin	(China) Li Huifen
1988	(North Korea) Li Bun-hui	(China) Dai Lili	(Japan) Mika Hoshino
1988	(North Korea) Li Bun-hui	(China) Dai Lili	(South Korea) Yang Young-ja
1989	(China) Chen Jing	(China) Li Huifen	(South Korea) Hyun Jung-hwa

=== Team events (2009–present) ===
Year	Location	Winning Team	Losing Team	Score	Ref.
2009	(China) Beijing	Asia (Hong Kong) Cheung Yuk (Chinese Taipei) Chuang Chih-yuan (South Korea) Joo Sae-hyuk (China) Ma Lin (China) Ma Long	Europe (Greece) Kalinikos Kreanga (Denmark) Michael Maze (Germany) Dimitrij Ovtcharov (Sweden) Jörgen Persson (Belarus) Vladimir Samsonov	6–4	
2009	(Turkey) Istanbul	Europe (Germany) Timo Boll (Greece) Kalinikos Kreanga (Denmark) Michael Maze (Belarus) Vladimir Samsonov (Austria) Werner Schlager	Asia (Chinese Taipei) Chuang Chih-yuan (Singapore) Gao Ning (South Korea) Joo Sae-hyuk (Hong Kong) Li Ching (China) Wang Hao	6–5	
2010	(China) Beijing	Asia (Hong Kong) Cheung Yuk (South Korea) Joo Sae-hyuk (Japan) Jun Mizutani (China) Wang Liqin (Singapore) Yang Zi	Europe (Denmark) Michael Maze (Germany) Dimitrij Ovtcharov (Sweden) Jörgen Persson (Belarus) Vladimir Samsonov (Austria) Werner Schlager	6–5	
2010	(Belgium) Mons	Asia (Chinese Taipei) Chuang Chih-yuan (South Korea) Joo Sae-hyuk (China) Ma Long (Japan) Jun Mizutani (Hong Kong) Tang Peng	Europe (Germany) Timo Boll (Austria) Chen Weixing (Greece) Kalinikos Kreanga (Belgium) Jean-Michel Saive (Belarus) Vladimir Samsonov	6–4	
2011	(China) Beijing	Asia (Chinese Taipei) Chuang Chih-yuan (South Korea) Joo Sae-hyuk (Japan) Jun Mizutani (Hong Kong) Tang Peng (China) Zhang Jike	Europe (Portugal) Tiago Apolónia (Germany) Timo Boll (Romania) Adrian Crişan (Belarus) Vladimir Samsonov (Austria) Werner Schlager	6–4	
2011	(Belarus) Minsk	Asia (Chinese Taipei) Chuang Chih-yuan (Singapore) Gao Ning (South Korea) Joo Sae-hyuk (Hong Kong) Tang Peng (China) Xu Xin	Europe (France) Adrien Mattenet (Denmark) Michael Maze (Germany) Dimitrij Ovtcharov (Belarus) Vladimir Samsonov (Russia) Alexey Smirnov	7–3	
2012	(China) Tianjin	Asia (Chinese Taipei) Chuang Chih-yuan (Singapore) Gao Ning (China) Hao Shuai (Hong Kong) Leung Chu Yan (Japan) Jun Mizutani	Europe (Romania) Adrian Crişan (Germany) Dimitrij Ovtcharov (Belarus) Vladimir Samsonov (Russia) Alexey Smirnov (Slovenia) Bojan Tokič	7–3	
2012	(France) La Roche-sur-Yon	Europe (Romania) Adrian Crişan (France) Adrien Mattenet (Denmark) Michael Maze (Germany) Dimitrij Ovtcharov (Belarus) Vladimir Samsonov	Asia (Hong Kong) Jiang Tianyi (India) Sharath Kamal (Japan) Chan Kazuhiro (China) Li Ping (South Korea) Ryu Seung-min	6–4	
2013	(China) Qingdao	Asia (Chinese Taipei) Chuang Chih-yuan (Hong Kong) Jiang Tianyi (South Korea) Joo Sae-hyuk (Japan) Jun Mizutani (China) Zhang Jike	Europe (Austria) Chen Weixing (Romania) Adrian Crişan (Portugal) Marcos Freitas (Germany) Dimitrij Ovtcharov (Belarus) Vladimir Samsonov	7–3	
2014	(China) Zhangjiagang	Asia (Chinese Taipei) Chuang Chih-yuan (Singapore) Gao Ning (Japan) Jun Mizutani (Hong Kong) Tang Peng (China) Xu Xin	Europe (Romania) Adrian Crişan (Austria) Robert Gardos (Greece) Panagiotis Gionis (Germany) Bastian Steger (Croatia) Tan Ruiwu	6–4	
2015	(China) Zhangjiagang	Europe (Portugal) Marcos Freitas (Croatia) Andrej Gaćina (Austria) Robert Gardos (Belarus) Vladimir Samsonov (Germany) Bastian Steger	Asia (Iran) Noshad Alamian (Chinese Taipei) Chuang Chih-yuan (Singapore) Gao Ning (China) Ma Long (Hong Kong) Tang Peng	6–4	
2016	(China) Dongguan	Asia (Chinese Taipei) Chuang Chih-yuan (China) Fan Zhendong (Singapore) Gao Ning (South Korea) Joo Sae-hyuk (Hong Kong) Wong Chun Ting	Europe (Portugal) Tiago Apolónia (Austria) Chen Weixing (Croatia) Andrej Gaćina (Belarus) Vladimir Samsonov (Russia) Alexander Shibaev	6–4	
2018	(China) Nantong	Asia (Chinese Taipei) Chuang Chih-yuan (South Korea) Lee Sang-su (Japan) Koki Niwa (Hong Kong) Wong Chun Ting (China) Zhang Jike	Europe (Portugal) Marcos Freitas (Denmark) Jonathan Groth (Sweden) Kristian Karlsson (Belarus) Vladimir Samsonov (Germany) Bastian Steger	7–3	

== Results ==
=== 2009 – Asia ===
Asia defeated Europe 6–4 on aggregate

25 August 2009	Asia	3–2	Europe	(China) Beijing

	Individual matches
Cheung Yuk (Hong Kong)	1–3	(Germany) Dimitrij Ovtcharov	8–11, 11–4, 9–11, 10–12
Ma Long (China)	3–0	(Greece) Kalinikos Kreanga	11–8, 11–7, 11–8
Chuang Chih-yuan (Chinese Taipei)	2–3	(Denmark) Michael Maze	11–8, 3–11, 8–11, 11–8, 3–11
Ma Lin (China)	3–1	(Belarus) Vladimir Samsonov	11–7, 9–11, 13–11, 11–4
Joo Sae-hyuk (South Korea)	3–1	(Sweden) Jörgen Persson	6–11, 11–8, 15–13, 11–8

26 August 2009	Asia	3–2	Europe	(China) Beijing

	Individual matches
Chuang Chih-yuan (Chinese Taipei)	3–0	(Sweden) Jörgen Persson	11–7, 11–5, 11–6
Ma Lin (China)	3–2	(Greece) Kalinikos Kreanga	7–11, 11–5, 11–7, 7–11, 11–8
Joo Sae-hyuk (South Korea)	1–3	(Germany) Dimitrij Ovtcharov	6–11, 7–11, 16–14, 8–11
Ma Long (China)	3–0	(Belarus) Vladimir Samsonov	11–9, 11–5, 11–6
Cheung Yuk (Hong Kong)	2–3	(Denmark) Michael Maze	11–13, 11–6, 11–7, 14–16, 4–11

=== 2009 – Europe ===
Europe defeated Asia 6–5 on aggregate

10 November 2009	Europe	2–3	Asia	(Turkey) Istanbul

	Individual matches
Kalinikos Kreanga (Greece)	1–3	(Singapore) Gao Ning	11–8, 8–11, 10–12, 6–11
Michael Maze (Denmark)	3–1	(Hong Kong) Li Ching	11–9, 11–9, 9–11, 11–9
Vladimir Samsonov (Belarus)	1–3	(China) Wang Hao	5–11, 11–4, 9–11, 10–12
Timo Boll (Germany)	3–2	(South Korea) Joo Sae-hyuk	11–6, 11–4, 4–11, 10–12, 11–4
Werner Schlager (Austria)	0–3	(Chinese Taipei) Chuang Chih-yuan	9–11, 6–11, 10–12

11 November 2009	Europe	4 (Note: Vladimir Samsonov defeated Li Ching 3–1 (11–8, 4–11, 11–9, 12–10) in an additional match to win the competition for Europe)–2	Asia	(Turkey) Istanbul

	Individual matches
Werner Schlager (Austria)	3–1	(Hong Kong) Li Ching	9–11, 11–5, 11–5, 11–7
Kalinikos Kreanga (Greece)	1–3	(Chinese Taipei) Chuang Chih-yuan	11–7, 7–11, 11–13, 5–11
Vladimir Samsonov (Belarus)	3–1	(South Korea) Joo Sae-hyuk	11–8, 8–11, 11–7, 11–9
Timo Boll (Germany)	3–0	(China) Wang Hao	11–6, 11–7, 11–6
Michael Maze (Denmark)	1–3	(Singapore) Gao Ning	9–11, 11–3, 13–15, 9–11

=== 2010 – Asia ===
Asia defeated Europe 6–5 on aggregate

13 April 2010	Asia	1–4	Europe	(China) Beijing

	Individual matches
Joo Sae-hyuk (South Korea)	3–2	(Austria) Werner Schlager	8–11, 6–11, 11–6, 11–9, 11–9
Cheung Yuk (Hong Kong)	0–3	(Germany) Dimitrij Ovtcharov	2–11, 9–11, 8–11
Wang Liqin (China)	2–3	(Denmark) Michael Maze	11–9, 8–11, 9–11, 12–10, 10–12
Jun Mizutani (Japan)	2–3	(Belarus) Vladimir Samsonov	15–13, 7–11, 5–11, 11–8, 5–11
Yang Zi (Singapore)	2–3	(Sweden) Jörgen Persson	11–6, 11–7, 8–11, 8–11, 7–11

15 April 2010	Asia	5 (Note: Jun Mizutani defeated Jörgen Persson 3–2 (11–7, 8–11, 11–9, 9–11, 11–8) in an additional match to win the competition for Asia)–1	Europe	(China) Beijing

	Individual matches
Joo Sae-hyuk (South Korea)	1–3	(Sweden) Jörgen Persson	6–11, 11–9, 5–11, 7–11
Yang Zi (Singapore)	3–0	(Germany) Dimitrij Ovtcharov	11–8, 13–11, 11–9
Jun Mizutani (Japan)	3–1	(Denmark) Michael Maze	11–8, 10–12, 12–10, 11–9
Wang Liqin (China)	3–1	(Belarus) Vladimir Samsonov	13–15, 11–6, 11–9, 11–8
Cheung Yuk (Hong Kong)	3–2	(Austria) Werner Schlager	9–11, 11–4, 10–12, 11–7, 11–7

=== 2010 – Europe ===
Asia defeated Europe 6–4 on aggregate

12 October 2010	Europe	2–3	Asia	(Belgium) Mons

	Individual matches
Chen Weixing (Austria)	1–3	(Chinese Taipei) Chuang Chih-yuan	6–11, 11–5, 9–11, 3–11
Kalinikos Kreanga (Greece)	3–0	(South Korea) Joo Sae-hyuk	12–10, 11–8, 11–3
Vladimir Samsonov (Belarus)	2–3	(China) Ma Long	9–11, 11–6, 12–10, 7–11, 7–11
Timo Boll (Germany)	3–0	(Japan) Jun Mizutani	11–4, 11–8, 11–9
Jean-Michel Saive (Belgium)	2–3	(Hong Kong) Tang Peng	11–8, 7–11, 11–6, 7–11, 12–14

13 October 2010	Europe	2–3	Asia	(Belgium) Mons

	Individual matches
Chen Weixing (Austria)	1–3	(Hong Kong) Tang Peng	11–4, 10–12, 6–11, 8–11
Jean-Michel Saive (Belgium)	0–3	(South Korea) Joo Sae-hyuk	8–11, 8–11, 8–11
Vladimir Samsonov (Belarus)	3–2	(Japan) Jun Mizutani	11–8, 10–12, 12–10, 6–11, 11–9
Timo Boll (Germany)	0–3	(China) Ma Long	4–11, 10–12, 10–12
Kalinikos Kreanga (Greece)	3–1	(Chinese Taipei) Chuang Chih-yuan	11–6, 3–11, 11–7, 11–9

== See also ==
- Asian Table Tennis Union
- European Table Tennis Union
