= 1986 Asian Table Tennis Championships =

1988 Asian Table Tennis Championships
- Date: 7–14 October 1986
- Edition: 8th
- Location: Shenzhen, China

Champions

Men's singles
- (China) Jiang Jialiang

Women's singles
- (China) He Zhili

Men's doubles
- (China) Hui Jun / (China) Teng Yi

Women's doubles
- (China) He Zhili / (China) Dai Lili

Mixed doubles
- (China) Hui Jun / (China) Geng Lijuan

Men's team
- China

Women's team
- China
← 1984 ·	Asian Table Tennis Championships	· 1988 →

The 8th Asian Table Tennis Championships 1986 were held in Shenzhen, China, from 7 to 14 October 1986. It was organised by the Chinese Table Tennis Association under the authority of Asian Table Tennis Union (ATTU) and International Table Tennis Federation (ITTF).

== Medal summary ==
=== Medal table ===
* Host nation (China)

Rank	Nation	Gold	Silver	Bronze	Total
1	China*	7	3	8	18
2	North Korea	0	3	1	4
3	South Korea	0	1	2	3
4	Japan	0	0	1	1
Totals (4 entries)		7	7	12	26

=== Events ===
Event	Gold	Silver	Bronze
Men's singles	(China) Jiang Jialiang	(China) Teng Yi	(China) Chen Longcan
Men's singles	(China) Jiang Jialiang	(China) Teng Yi	(China) Wang Hao
Women's singles	(China) He Zhili	(China) Jiao Zhimin	(China) Dai Lili
Women's singles	(China) He Zhili	(China) Jiao Zhimin	(China) Geng Lijuan
Men's doubles	(China) Hui Jun (China) Teng Yi	(China) Chen Longcan (China) Wei Qingguang	(China) Jiang Jialiang (China) Sun Jianwei
Men's doubles	(China) Hui Jun (China) Teng Yi	(China) Chen Longcan (China) Wei Qingguang	(Japan) Yuji Matsushita (Japan) Seiji Ono
Women's doubles	(China) Dai Lili (China) He Zhili	(North Korea) Cho Jong-hui (North Korea) Ri Pun-hui	(China) Chen Jing (China) Li Huifen
Women's doubles	(China) Dai Lili (China) He Zhili	(North Korea) Cho Jong-hui (North Korea) Ri Pun-hui	(China) Geng Lijuan (China) Jiao Zhimin
Mixed doubles	(China) Hui Jun (China) Geng Lijuan	(South Korea) Kim Wan (South Korea) Hyun Jung-hwa	(China) Teng Yi (China) Dai Lili
Mixed doubles	(China) Hui Jun (China) Geng Lijuan	(South Korea) Kim Wan (South Korea) Hyun Jung-hwa	(North Korea) Kim Song-hui (North Korea) Ri Pun-hui
Men's team	China	North Korea	South Korea
Women's team	China	North Korea	South Korea

== See also ==
- World Table Tennis Championships
- Asian Cup
