= 1987 World Table Tennis Championships – Women's singles =

1987 Women's singles

The 1987 World Table Tennis Championships women's singles was the 39th edition of the women's singles championship. He Zhili defeated Yang Young-ja in the final by three sets to nil, to win the title.

== Results ==
Round of 16
(China) Geng Lijuan	21	10	21	13	17
(North Korea) Ri Pun-hui	13	21	18	21	21
(China) Guan Jianhua	21	21	21
(Hungary) Csilla Bátorfi	9	8	16
(China) Chen Jing	21	21	21	21
(South Korea) Hyun Jung-hwa	23	17	17	15
(China) He Zhili	18	21	21	21
(Bulgaria) Daniela Guergueltcheva	21	12	6	16
(China) Dai Lili	21	21	21
(Soviet Union) Fliura Bulatova	7	16	11
(China) Li Huifen	21	21	21
(Japan) Kiyomi Ishida	13	15	6
(South Korea) Yang Young-ja	21	21	21
(Hungary) Edit Urban	11	17	9
(Czechoslovakia) Marie Hrachová	14	17	21	21	21
(China) Jiao Zhimin	21	21	14	19	19

Quarterfinals
(North Korea) Ri Pun-hui	7	19	21	21	11
(China) Guan Jianhua	21	21	12	16	21
(China) Chen Jing	21	15	14	15
(China) He Zhili	19	21	21	21
(China) Dai Lili	21	21	21
(China) Li Huifen	18	16	18
(South Korea) Yang Young-ja	21	15	22	21
(Czechoslovakia) Hrachova	18	21	20	17

Semifinals
(China) Guan Jianhua	7	7	18
(China) He Zhili	21	21	21
(China) Dai Lili	16	14	21	21	18
(South Korea) Yang Young-ja	21	21	13	19	21

Final
(China) He Zhili	21	21	21
(South Korea) Yang Young-ja	17	19	18

== See also ==
- List of World Table Tennis Championships medalists
