= 1988 Asian Table Tennis Championships =

- Date: 15–22 May 1988
- Edition: 9th
- Location: Niigata, Japan

Champions

Men's singles
- (China) Chen Longcan

Women's singles
- (China) He Zhili

Men's doubles
- (China) Chen Longcan / (China) Wei Qingguang

Women's doubles
- (South Korea) Hyun Jung-hwa / (South Korea) Yang Young-ja

Mixed doubles
- (South Korea) Yoo Nam-kyu / (South Korea) Hyun Jung-hwa

Men's team
- China

Women's team
- South Korea
← 1986 ·	Asian Table Tennis Championships	· 1990 →

The 9th Asian Table Tennis Championships 1988 were held in Niigata, Japan, from 15 to 22 May 1988. It was organised by the Japan Table Tennis Association under the authority of Asian Table Tennis Union (ATTU) and International Table Tennis Federation (ITTF).

== Medal summary ==
=== Medal table ===
* Host nation (Japan)

Rank	Nation	Gold	Silver	Bronze	Total
1	China	4	2	6	12
2	South Korea	3	1	4	8
3	Chinese Taipei	0	2	1	3
4	North Korea	0	2	0	2
5	Japan*	0	0	1	1
Totals (5 entries)		7	7	12	26

=== Events ===
Event	Gold	Silver	Bronze
Men's singles	(China) Chen Longcan	(South Korea) Yoo Nam-kyu	(China) Jiang Jialiang
Men's singles	(China) Chen Longcan	(South Korea) Yoo Nam-kyu	(China) Wei Qingguang
Women's singles	(China) He Zhili	(China) Jiao Zhimin	(China) Li Huifen
Women's singles	(China) He Zhili	(China) Jiao Zhimin	(South Korea) Hyun Jung-hwa
Men's doubles	(China) Chen Longcan (China) Wei Qingguang	(Chinese Taipei) Chih Chin-long (Chinese Taipei) Chih Chin-shui	(South Korea) Ahn Jae-hyung (South Korea) Yoo Nam-kyu
Men's doubles	(China) Chen Longcan (China) Wei Qingguang	(Chinese Taipei) Chih Chin-long (Chinese Taipei) Chih Chin-shui	(South Korea) Kim Ki-taik (South Korea) Kim Wan
Women's doubles	(South Korea) Hyun Jung-hwa (South Korea) Yang Young-ja	(Chinese Taipei) Chang Hsiu-yu (Chinese Taipei) Huang Mei-jen	(China) He Zhili (China) Li Huifen
Women's doubles	(South Korea) Hyun Jung-hwa (South Korea) Yang Young-ja	(Chinese Taipei) Chang Hsiu-yu (Chinese Taipei) Huang Mei-jen	(Japan) Katsuko Tominaga (Japan) Kyoko Uchiyama
Mixed doubles	(South Korea) Yoo Nam-kyu (South Korea) Hyun Jung-hwa	(China) Jiang Jialiang (China) Jiao Zhimin	(China) Wei Qingguang (China) Li Huifen
Mixed doubles	(South Korea) Yoo Nam-kyu (South Korea) Hyun Jung-hwa	(China) Jiang Jialiang (China) Jiao Zhimin	(Chinese Taipei) Liu Wei-chung (Chinese Taipei) Chang Hsiu-yu
Men's team	China	North Korea	South Korea
Women's team	South Korea	North Korea	China

== See also ==
- World Table Tennis Championships
- Asian Cup
