= 1987 World Table Tennis Championships – Women's doubles =

1987 Women's doubles

The 1987 World Table Tennis Championships women's doubles was the 38th edition of the women's doubles championship. Hyun Jung-hwa and Yang Young-ja defeated Dai Lili and Li Huifen in the final by two sets to one.

== Results ==
Round of 16
(China) Dai Lili (China) Li Huifen	2
(South Korea) Baek Soon-Ae (South Korea) Hong Soon-hwa	0
(Japan) Mika Hoshino (Japan) Miki Kitsukawa	2
(West Germany) Nicole Dekein (West Germany) Katja Nolten	1
(China) Chen Zihe (China) Zhu Juan	2
(Hungary) Csilla Bátorfi (Hungary) Edit Urbán	0
(Soviet Union) Raisa Timofeeva (Soviet Union) Valentina Popova	0
(North Korea) Cho Jung-hui (North Korea) Li Bun Hui	2
(Czechoslovakia) Marie Hrachová (Czechoslovakia) Renata Kasalová	2
(China) Chen Jing (China) Geng Lijuan	1
(South Korea) Hyun Jung-hwa (South Korea) Yang Young-ja	2
(Bulgaria) Daniela Guergeultcheva (Socialist Federal Republic of Yugoslavia) Gordana Perkučin	0
(North Korea) Pang Chun-Dok (North Korea) Kim Gyong-sun	2
(Soviet Union) Fliura Bulatova (Soviet Union) Elena Kovtun	0
(China) He Zhili (China) Jiao Zhimin	2
(Japan) Kiyomi Ishida (Japan) Kyoko Uchiyama	0

Quarterfinals
(China) Dai Lili (China) Li Huifen	2
(Japan) Hoshino (Japan) Kitsukawa	1
(China) Chen Zihe (China) Zhu Juan	0
(North Korea) Cho Jong Hui (North Korea) Li Bun Hui	2
(Czechoslovakia) Hrachová (Czechoslovakia) Kasalová	0
(South Korea) Hyun Jung-hwa (South Korea) Yang Young-ja	2
(North Korea) Pang Chun Dok (North Korea) Kim Gyoung Son	0
(China) He Zhili (China) Jiao Zhimin	2

Semifinals
(China) Dai Lili (China) Li Huifen	21	21
(North Korea) Cho Jung Hui (North Korea) Li Bun Hui	19	10
(South Korea) Hyun Jung-hwa (South Korea) Yang Young-ja	21	21
(China) He Zhili (China) Jiao Zhimin	11	19

Final
(China) Dai Lili (China) Li Huifen	23	13	19
(South Korea) Hyun Jung-hwa (South Korea) Yang Young-ja	21	21	21

== See also ==
- List of World Table Tennis Championships medalists
