= 1984 Asian Table Tennis Championships =

- Date: 20 – 28 October 1984
- Edition: 7th
- Location: Islamabad, Pakistan

Champions

Men's singles
- (China) Xie Saike

Women's singles
- (China) He Zhili

Men's doubles
- (China) Teng Yi / (China) Xie Saike

Women's doubles
- (China) Dai Lili / (China) Geng Lijuan

Mixed doubles
- (China) Xie Saike / (China) Dai Lili

Men's team
- China

Women's team
- China
← 1982 ·	Asian Table Tennis Championships	· 1986 →

The 7th Asian Table Tennis Championships 1984 were held in Islamabad, Pakistan, from 20 to 28 October 1984. It was organised by the Pakistan Table Tennis Federation under the authority of Asian Table Tennis Union (ATTU) and International Table Tennis Federation (ITTF).

== Medal summary ==
=== Medal table ===
Rank	Nation	Gold	Silver	Bronze	Total
1	China	7	4	4	15
2	North Korea	0	2	3	5
3	South Korea	0	1	2	3
4	Japan	0	0	3	3
Totals (4 entries)		7	7	12	26

=== Events ===
Event	Gold	Silver	Bronze
Men's singles	(China) Xie Saike	(China) Chen Longcan	(China) Wang Huiyuan
Men's singles	(China) Xie Saike	(China) Chen Longcan	(North Korea) Ri Gun-sang
Women's singles	(China) He Zhili	(China) Dai Lili	(China) Geng Lijuan
Women's singles	(China) He Zhili	(China) Dai Lili	(China) Jiao Zhimin
Men's doubles	(China) Teng Yi (China) Xie Saike	(China) Chen Longcan (China) Wang Huiyuan	(North Korea) Cho Yong-ho (North Korea) Hong Chol
Men's doubles	(China) Teng Yi (China) Xie Saike	(China) Chen Longcan (China) Wang Huiyuan	(South Korea) Kim Ki-taik (South Korea) Kim Wan
Women's doubles	(China) Dai Lili (China) Geng Lijuan	(South Korea) Yang Young-ja (South Korea) Yoon Kyung-mi	(North Korea) Cho Jong-hui (North Korea) Ri Pun-hui
Women's doubles	(China) Dai Lili (China) Geng Lijuan	(South Korea) Yang Young-ja (South Korea) Yoon Kyung-mi	(Japan) Mika Hoshino (Japan) Yoshiko Shimauchi
Mixed doubles	(China) Xie Saike (China) Dai Lili	(China) Wang Huiyuan (China) He Zhili	(China) Chen Longcan (China) Jiao Zhimin
Mixed doubles	(China) Xie Saike (China) Dai Lili	(China) Wang Huiyuan (China) He Zhili	(Japan) Kiyoshi Saito (Japan) Yoshiko Shimauchi
Men's team	China	North Korea	Japan
Women's team	China	North Korea	South Korea

== See also ==
- World Table Tennis Championships
- Asian Cup
