= 1987 World Table Tennis Championships – Men's singles =

1987 Men's singles

The 1987 World Table Tennis Championships men's singles was the 39th edition of the men's singles championship.

Jiang Jialiang defeated Jan-Ove Waldner in the final, winning three sets to one to secure the title.

== Results ==
Round of 16
(China) Jiang Jialiang | 21 | 20 | 21 | 21
(France) Patrick Rénverse | 11 | 22 | 17 | 17
(China) Hui Jun | 21 | 21 | 22
(Brazil) Cláudio Kano | 14 | 15 | 20
(China) Wang Hao | 21 | 21 | 14 | 21
(England) Alan Cooke | 10 | 14 | 21 | 11
(China) Chen Xinhua | 10 | 18 | 21 | 21 | 21
(Poland) Leszek Kucharski | 21 | 21 | 12 | 18 | 18
(China) Teng Yi | 21 | 21 | 21
(North Korea) Chu Jong-Chol | 13 | 17 | 17
(Soviet Union) Andrei Mazunov | 19 | 19 | 21 | 13
(Poland) Andrzej Grubba | 21 | 21 | 15 | 21
(Sweden) Jan-Ove Waldner | 14 | 21 | 21 | 21
(England) Desmond Douglas | 21 | 19 | 18 | 19
(China) Chen Longcan | 21 | 21 | 21
(Japan) Yoshihito Miyazaki | 13 | 16 | 12

Quarterfinals
(China) Jiang Jialiang | 21 | 23 | 21
(China) Hui Jun | 13 | 21 | 14
(China) Wang Hao | 21 | 21 | 21
(China) Chen Xinhua | 13 | 12 | 13
(China) Teng Yi | 21 | 17 | 21 | 21
(Poland) Grubba | 15 | 21 | 19 | 12
(Sweden) Waldner | 21 | 21 | 21
(China) Chen Longcan | 17 | 15 | 11

Semifinals
(China) Jiang Jialiang | 21 | 21 | 21
(China) Chen Xinhua | 18 | 14 | 10
(China) Teng Yi | 17 | 20 | 9
(Sweden) Waldner | 21 | 22 | 21

Final
(China) Jiang Jialiang | 14 | 21 | 21 | 24
(Sweden) Waldner | 21 | 18 | 11 | 22

== See also ==
List of World Table Tennis Championships medalists
