= 1989 World Table Tennis Championships – Men's doubles =

1989 Men's doubles

The 1989 World Table Tennis Championships men's doubles was the 40th edition of the men's doubles championship. Jörg Rosskopf and Steffen Fetzner won the title after defeating Leszek Kucharski and Zoran Kalinić in the final by two sets to one.

== Results ==
Round of 16
(China) Chen Longcan (China) Wei Qingguang	21	21
(Chinese Taipei) Wu Wen-Chia (Chinese Taipei) Huang Huei-Chien	9	12
(Czechoslovakia) Tomas Janci (Czechoslovakia) Miroslav Cecava	21	10	21
(Sweden) Erik Lindh (Sweden) Jörgen Persson	13	21	19
(West Germany) Jörg Roßkopf (West Germany) Steffen Fetzner	21	14	21
(Sweden) Ulf "Tickan" Carlsson (Sweden) Ulf Bengtsson	14	21	14
(Poland) Andrzej Grubba (France) Jean-Philippe Gatien	16	21	21
(South Korea) Yoo Nam-kyu (South Korea) Kim Taek-soo	21	11	17
(Sweden) Jan-Ove Waldner (Sweden) Mikael Appelgren	16	18
(China) Teng Yi (China) Hui Jun	21	21
(Japan) Hiroshi Shibutani (Japan) Kōji Matsushita	15	21	22
(South Korea) Kim Ki-taik (South Korea) Ahn Jae-hyung	21	17	20
(England) Alan Cooke (England) Carl Prean	17	21	21
(Hungary) Tibor Klampár (Austria) Ding Yi	21	18	17
(Poland) Leszek Kucharski (Socialist Federal Republic of Yugoslavia) Zoran Kalinić	21	21
(China) Xie Chaojie (China) Lü Lin	16	14

Quarterfinals
(China) Chen Longcan (China) Wei Qingguang	21	21
(Czechoslovakia) Janci (Czechoslovakia) Cecava	10	10
(West Germany) Roßkopf (West Germany) Fetzner	21	19	21
(Poland) Grubba (France) Gatien	16	21	18
(China) Teng Yi (China) Hui Jun	21	13	21
(Japan) Shibutani (Japan) Matsushita	19	21	10
(England) Cooke (England) Prean	15	17
(Poland) Kucharski (Socialist Federal Republic of Yugoslavia) Kalinić	21	21

Semifinals
(China) Chen Longcan (China) Wei Qingguang	21	12	17
(West Germany) Roßkopf (West Germany) Fetzner	11	21	21
(China) Teng Yi (China) Hui Jun	15	17
(Poland) Kucharski (Socialist Federal Republic of Yugoslavia) Kalinić	21	21

Final
(West Germany) Roßkopf (West Germany) Fetzner	18	21	21
(Poland) Kucharski (Socialist Federal Republic of Yugoslavia) Kalinić	21	17	19

== See also ==
List of World Table Tennis Championships medalists
