= Team Asia =

The term Team Asia is used in a number of sports to designate a unified team of Asian countries in several sports competitions and sports tournaments.

== Competitions featuring an Asia team ==
Competition	Sport	Contributing regions	Notes
2016 ISU Team Challenge Cup	Figure skating		The inaugural ISU Team Challenge Cup features Team Asia against Team Europe and Team North America
2015 Kings Cup	Pool (cue sport)		The inaugural Kings Cup featured Team Asia versus European and US players on Team West.
Queens Cup	Billiards		Team Asia plays against Team West
2015 Peachtree Cup	Road running		The inaugural Peachtree Cup, part of the Peachtree Road Race 2015 competition, featured Team Asia against Team USA, Team Europe, Team Africa.
2014 World Ladies Championship Goodwill Cup	Golf		The inaugural World Ladies Championship Goodwill Cup featured Team Asia versus Team Europe. The Goodwill Cup large team championship was played as part of the World Ladies Championship.
EurAsia Cup	Golf		The EurAsia Cup features Team Asia versus Team Europe.
Euro-Asia Cup	Table tennis		The Euro-Asia Cup features Team Asia versus Team Europe.
Basketbol Süper Ligi All-Star Game	Basketball		The Turkish Basketball Super League's game features Team Asia versus Team Europe, with the teams consisting of players representing clubs based in the Asian (Anatolia) and European (East Thrace) portions of Turkey.

Note that in the above sports there also exist national teams taking part in other competitions

== See also ==
- Team North America
- Team Europe
- Team World
- Team Africa
- Team Latin America
