= Table tennis at the 1988 Summer Olympics =

Table tennis at the Games of the XXIV Olympiad
- Venue: Seoul National University Gymnasium
- Dates: 23 September to 1 October 1988
- Competitors: 129 from 41 nations

Table tennis was first included in the Olympic program at the 1988 Summer Olympics in Seoul, with four events contested. Prior to the 1988 Summer Olympics, Table tennis has been held at the Summer Paralympic Games since they were first held in 1960.

== Participating nations ==
A total of 129 athletes (81 men and 48 women), representing 41 NOCs, competed in four events.

- Argentina (1)
- Australia (3)
- Austria (2)
- Belgium (2)
- Brazil (2)
- Bulgaria (2)
- Canada (3)
- Chile (3)
- China (7)
- Czechoslovakia (4)
- Dominican Republic (3)
- Egypt (3)
- France (2)
- Ghana (1)
- Great Britain (4)
- Hong Kong (6)
- Hungary (5)
- India (3)
- Indonesia (1)
- Iraq (1)
- Italy (1)
- Jamaica (1)
- Japan (7)
- Jordan (1)
- Malaysia (2)
- Mauritius (2)
- Netherlands (2)
- New Zealand (2)
- Nigeria (6)
- Pakistan (1)
- Peru (1)
- Poland (3)
- South Korea (7)
- Soviet Union (5)
- Sweden (4)
- Chinese Taipei (6)
- Tunisia (4)
- United States (3)
- Venezuela (2)
- Yugoslavia (5)
- West Germany (6)

== Medal summary ==
Event	Gold	Silver	Bronze
Men's singles	Yoo Nam-kyu; South Korea	Kim Ki-taik; South Korea	Erik Lindh; Sweden
Men's doubles	Chen Longcan / Wei Qingguang (CHN)	Ilija Lupulesku / Zoran Primorac (YUG)	Ahn Jae-hyung / Yoo Nam-kyu (KOR)
Women's singles	Chen Jing; China	Li Huifen; China	Jiao Zhimin; China
Women's doubles	Hyun Jung-hwa / Yang Young-ja (KOR)	Chen Jing / Jiao Zhimin (CHN)	Jasna Fazlić / Gordana Perkučin (YUG)

== Medal table ==
Rank	Nation	Gold	Silver	Bronze	Total
1	China	2	2	1	5
2	South Korea	2	1	1	4
3	Yugoslavia	0	1	1	2
4	Sweden	0	0	1	1
Totals (4 entries)		4	4	4	12

== Sources ==
- "Olympic Medal Winners". International Olympic Committee.
- International Table Tennis Federation (ITTF)
- "Table Tennis at the 1988 Seoul Summer Games". www.sports-reference.com. Archived from the original on 17 April 2020.
