= Shenzhen Arena =

Sports venue in Shenzhen, China

Shenzhen Arena 深圳体育馆
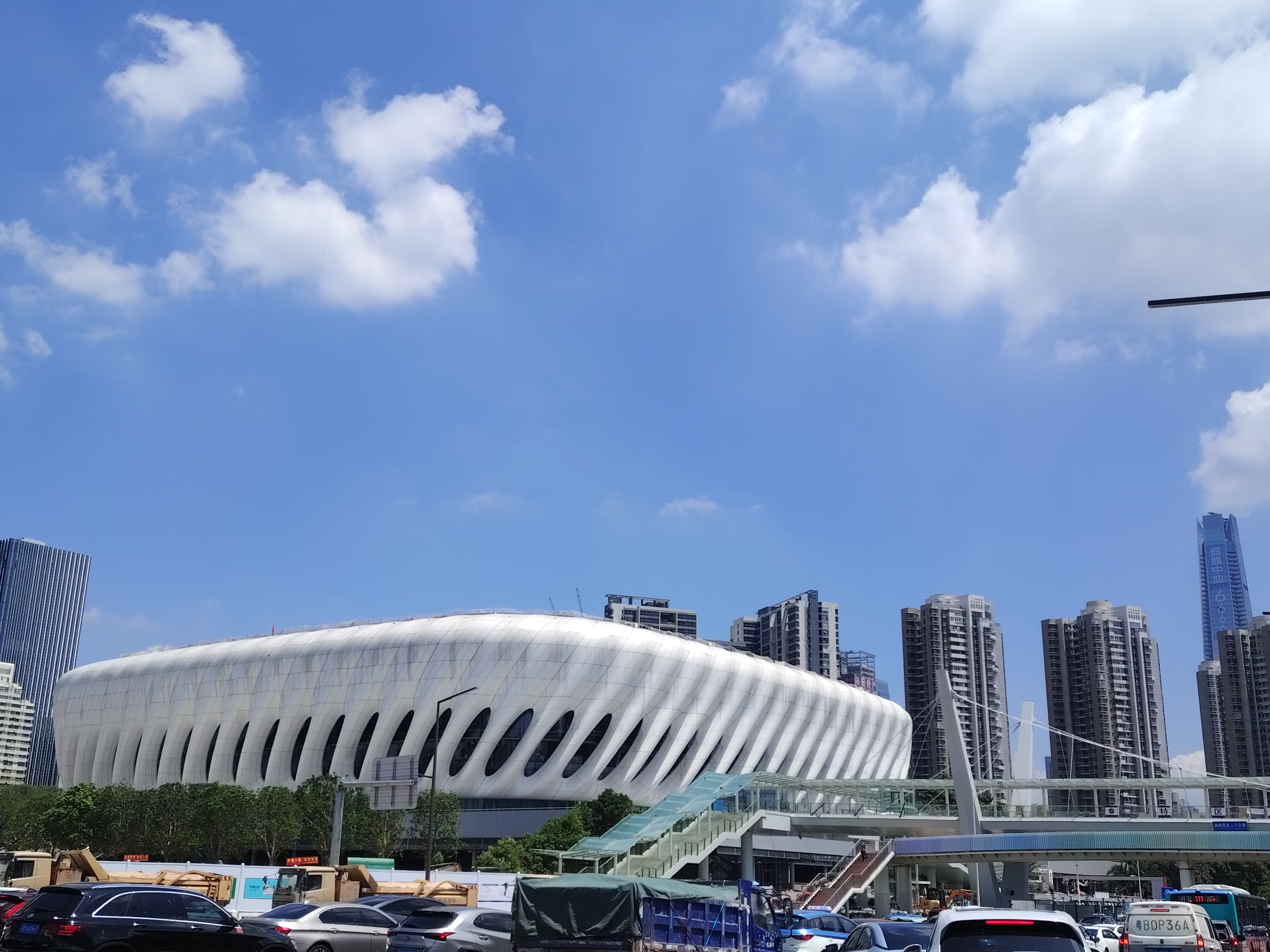
- Interactive map of Shenzhen Arena 深圳体育馆
- Location: Futian, Shenzhen, Guangdong, China
- Coordinates: 22°33′35.8″N 114°05′18.8″E
- Owner: Shenzhen Municipal People's Government
- Operator: Culture, Media, Tourism and Sports Bureau of Shenzhen Municipality
- Capacity: 6,000 (before renovation); 16,000 (after renovation)
- Public transit: 6 Sports Center

Construction
- Opened: December 22, 1985; 40 years ago
- Closed: 2018
- Reopened: 2024
- Demolished: 2019

Tenant
- Shenzhen Leopards (CBA)

Chinese name
- Simplified Chinese: 深圳体育馆
- Traditional Chinese: 深圳體育館
Transcriptions
Standard Mandarin
- Hanyu Pinyin: Shēnzhèn Tǐyùguǎn
- Wade–Giles: Shenchen T'iyükuan
Yue: Cantonese
- Yale Romanization: Sāmjan Táiyuhkgún

Shenzhen Arena (also known as Shenzhen Gymnasium) is an indoor arena located in Futian, Shenzhen, Guangdong, China. Built in 1985 as part of Shenzhen Sports Center, the original building was closed in 2018 and was subsequently demolished. A new arena was constructed on the original site and opened in 2024.

== History ==
The arena is the first indoor arena in Shenzhen, which was built as one of the eight major facilities for the newly designated special economic zone. Aside from sport events, it also hosted important political events such as the tenth and twentieth anniversary of the founding of Shenzhen.

In 2018, it was decided that Shenzhen Sports Center would undergo a renovation due to aging facilities and the arena will be rebuilt. The renovation project was started in 2020 and the new arena was finished in 2024. The first event to be held in the new arena was a Chinese Basketball League match between Shenzhen Leopards against Jiangsu Kentier.

== Events ==
- 1986 Asian Table Tennis Championships
- 1987 and 2025 National Games of China
- 2011 Summer Universiade volleyball tournament
- 2024 China Masters
- Division A games of the 2025 FIBA Women's Asia Cup
