= Fightmaster Cup =

Team golf tournament

The Fightmaster Cup is a match play golf tournament involving players from North America and Europe. It is an event which involves golfers with the use of one arm only, with it being the first international tournament in history for one-armed golfers. The Cup is named after Don Fightmaster, described by Time magazine as "an Arnold Palmer of the one-armed-golf world".

The tournament is played between one-armed golfers from the North American One-Armed Golfer Association, formed in 2000, and the Society of One-Armed Golfers, formed in 1932 and based in Glasgow. As a team event, the winner will be one of the two continental organisations and not individual players.

The inaugural meeting in 2008 was held just prior to the Ryder Cup, at The Cardinal Club in Simpsonville, Kentucky, near Louisville. The new tournament's requirements on participants are still being debated and discussed, with the exclusion of "assisted players" being a prominent issue.

== Format ==
The 2008 Fightmaster Cup comprised two teams, selected by each of the two competing associations. Both teams consisted of twelve competitors, selected primarily from annually-held and end-of-season championships within their continental associations.

The tournament took place over three days, from September 11 through to September 13. The match play format follows that of the Ryder Cup, with the tournament consisting of eight foursomes matches, eight fourball matches and twelve singles matches.

The winner of each match scores a point for their team, with ½ a point each for any match that is tied after 18 holes. The winner of the Fightmaster Cup will be the association who scores the most points following the twenty-four matches over the three days.

== Rules ==
According to the rules of the tournament, only players who just use one arm to play and do not use the second during golfing in any way are allowed to compete. The exclusion of "assisted players" from the event is currently being debated; that is, players who use a second arm (or prosthetic substitute) to support the club despite the arm not being functional and responsive. The North American association has a division to accommodate assisted players, while the European association does not.

== Results ==
Fightmaster Cup
Year	Winners	Score		Runners-up	Host country	Venue	Ref.
2025					Ireland	Roganstown Golf Club, Ireland	
2018	Europe	17	11	(United States) North America	England	Walmer & Kingsdown GC, Kent	
2016	Europe	15	13	(United States) North America	United States	Indiana Wells Resort and Spa, Palm Springs, CA	
2014	Europe	21	7	(United States) North America	Scotland	Stirling Golf Club	
2012	Europe	20½	7½	(United States) North America	United States	The Hilton Indian Lakes Resort, Chicago	
2010	Europe	16	12	(United States) North America	Wales	Marriott St Pierre Hotel & Country Club	
2008	(United States) North America	19½	8½	Europe	United States	The Cardinal Club, Kentucky	

== Venues ==
Maps of Fightmaster Cup venues.

Fightmaster Cups held in the USA
Fightmaster Cups held in the British isles
