= Team Europe =

Multinational sports team

- European Flag
- Sport: Various
- Jurisdiction: Europe
- Abbreviation: TE
- Affiliation: 7 sporting competitions

Team Europe may refer to a number of sports team using the designate to represent a unified team of European countries in sporting competitions. Whilst neither the European Union nor the Council of Europe are countries themselves, European teams have been formed to compete in several international competitions. The most famous of these is the Ryder Cup in golf which sees a European team play against a team from the US in even-numbered years. In association football, a selection of European footballers play occasionally for charity games and anniversary games in the Europe XI team.

Team Europe may also refer to cooperative efforts between the European Union, its Member States, the European Investment Bank, and the European Bank for Reconstruction and Development. Team Europe was created in response to the COVID-19 pandemic to improve coherence and coordination between its members.

== Examples of competitions featuring a European team ==
"Team Europe" is the official designation of the team representing Europe in several international competitions

=== Europe vs. USA ===
- Ryder Cup – Biennial men's professional golf event
- Solheim Cup – Biennial women's professional golf event
- Arnold Palmer Cup – Annual men's amateur golf event featuring college/university players. "Team Europe" was replaced by an "International Team", representing all non-US nationalities, starting in 2018.
- Mosconi Cup – Annual Nine-ball pool competition
- Weber Cup – Annual Ten-pin bowling competition

=== Europe vs. Asia ===
- EurAsia Cup – Biennial men's professional golf event
- Royal Trophy – Defunct men's professional golf event from 2006 to 2013, replaced by the EurAsia Cup.
- Bonallack Trophy – Biennial men's amateur golf event (Team Europe vs. Team Asia/Pacific)
- Euro-Asia Cup – Table tennis

=== Other ===
- Fightmaster Cup – Biennial golf event involving players with the use of one arm only (Team Europe vs. Team North America)
- Continental Cup of Curling – Curling
- IAAF World Cup – Athletics
- Laver Cup – Tennis (Team Europe vs Team World)
- NFL Global Junior Championship – American football
- 2016 World Cup of Hockey (team) – Ice hockey
- International Cybersecurity Challenge

Note that in the above sports there also exist national teams taking part in other competitions.

=== Junior Events ===
- Junior Ryder Cup – Biennial golf event based on the Ryder Cup
- Junior Solheim Cup – Biennial golf event for girls aged 12 to 18, based on the Solheim Cup

== Competitions featuring a Europe team ==
Competition	Team	Sport	Contributing regions	Notes	References
2020 Bandy Y17 World Championship	Team Europe	Bandy	The United States and all of Europe except: Finland; Norway; Russia; Sweden	A Team Europe was set up to allow youth players from a number of "developing" bandy countries to come together and form a team which would hopefully be more competitive and which could serve as ambassadors for the sport in the countries from which the team had collected its players.	
2016 World Cup of Hockey	WCH2016	Ice hockey	All of Europe except: Czech Republic; Finland; Sweden; Russia	The 2016 World Cup of Hockey included eight teams: the so-called "Big Six" nations of (Canada, the Czech Republic, Finland, Russia, Sweden, and the United States), a team of 23-and-under North American players, and Team Europe which is made up of European players from non-represented countries, with representation from Austria, Denmark, France, Germany, Norway, Slovakia, Slovenia and Switzerland.	
2016 ISU Team Challenge Cup		Figure skating		The inaugural ISU Team Challenge Cup features Team Europe against Team North America and Team Asia	
2015 Peachtree Cup		Road running		The inaugural Peachtree Cup, part of the Peachtree Road Race 2015 competition, featured Team Europe against Team USA, Team Africa, Team Asia.	
2014 World Ladies Championship Goodwill Cup		Golf		The inaugural World Ladies Championship Goodwill Cup featured Team Europe versus Team Asia. The Goodwill Cup large team championship was played as part of the World Ladies Championship.	
EurAsia Cup		Golf		The EurAsia Cup features Team Europe versus Team Asia.	
Euro-Asia Cup		Table tennis		The Euro-Asia Cup features Team Europe versus Team Asia.	
Continental Cup of Curling		Curling	all Europe	Team Europe or Team World against Team North America	

Note that in the above sports there also exist national teams taking part in other competitions

== Other examples of "Team Europe" ==
Competition	Sport	Contributing regions	Notes	References
BSL All-Star Game	Basketball	Basketball Super League member clubs based in East Thrace, the European portion of Turkey	The All-Star Game currently features a game between Team Asia and Team Europe, with "Team Asia" consisting of players for BSL clubs based in Anatolia, the Asian portion of Turkey.	

== See also ==
- Team North America
- World team
