= An Jaehyeon =

An Jaehyeon (Korean: 안재현) may refer to:

- Ahn Jae-hyun (born 1987), South Korean actor
- An Jae-hyun (born 1999), South Korean table tennis player

== See also ==
- Ahn Jae-hyung (born 1965), South Korean table tennis player and coach
