= 2024 China Masters =

Badminton tournament in China

Tournament details
- Dates: 19–24 November
- Edition: 17th
- Level: Super 750
- Total prize money: US$1,150,000
- Venue: Shenzhen Arena
- Location: Shenzhen, China

Champions
- Men's singles: (Denmark) Anders Antonsen
- Women's singles: (South Korea) An Se-young
- Men's doubles: (South Korea) Jin Yong (South Korea) Seo Seung-jae
- Women's doubles: (China) Liu Shengshu (China) Tan Ning
- Mixed doubles: (China) Feng Yanzhe (China) Huang Dongping

The 2024 China Masters (officially known as the Li-Ning China Masters 2024 for sponsorship reasons) was a badminton tournament that took place at Shenzhen Arena in Shenzhen, China, from 19 to 24 November 2024, and featured a total prize pool of $1,150,000.

== Tournament ==
The 2024 China Masters was the thirty-sixth tournament of the 2024 BWF World Tour and was also part of the China Masters championships, which have been held since 2005. This tournament was organized by the Chinese Badminton Association and was sanctioned by the BWF.

=== Venue ===
This international tournament was held at Shenzhen Arena in Shenzhen, China.

=== Point distribution ===
Below is the point distribution table for each phase of the tournament based on the BWF points system for the BWF World Tour Super 750 event.

Winner	Runner-up	3/4	5/8	9/16	17/32
11,000	9,350	7,700	6,050	4,320	2,660

=== Prize pool ===
The total prize money was US$1,150,000 with the distribution of the prize money in accordance with BWF regulations.

Event	Winner	Finalist	Semi-finals	Quarter-finals	Last 16	Last 32
Singles	$80,500	$39,100	$16,100	$6,325	$3,450	$1,150
Doubles	$85,100	$40,250	$16,100	$7,187.5	$3,737.5	$1,150

== Men's singles ==
=== Seeds ===
1. (China) Shi Yuqi (semi-finals)
2. (Denmark) Viktor Axelsen (semi-finals)
3. (Denmark) Anders Antonsen (champion)
4. (Japan) Kodai Naraoka (withdrew)
5. (Thailand) Kunlavut Vitidsarn (quarter-finals)
6. (Indonesia) Jonatan Christie (final)
7. (Malaysia) Lee Zii Jia (first round)
8. (Chinese Taipei) Chou Tien-chen (first round)

=== Finals ===
Semi-finals
1	(China) Shi Yuqi	17	16
6	(Indonesia) Jonatan Christie	21	21
3	(Denmark) Anders Antonsen	16	21	22
2	(Denmark) Viktor Axelsen	21	9	20

Final
6	(Indonesia) Jonatan Christie	15	13
3	(Denmark) Anders Antonsen	21	21

=== Top half ===
==== Section 1 ====
First round
1	(China) Shi YQ	21	21
(Chinese Taipei) Lee C-h	17	16
PFR	(India) P Rajawat	24	13	18
(Indonesia) C A Dwi Wardoyo	22	21	21
5	(Thailand) K Vitidsarn	16	21	21
(Chinese Taipei) Chi Y-j	21	18	19
(Chinese Taipei) Wang T-w	19	21	21
(Canada) B Yang	21	10	16

Second round
1	(China) Shi YQ	21	21
(Indonesia) C A Dwi Wardoyo	18	10
5	(Thailand) K Vitidsarn	21	21
(Chinese Taipei) Wang T-w	16	17

Quarter-finals
1	(China) Shi YQ	21	21
5	(Thailand) K Vitidsarn	18	8

==== Section 2 ====
First round
6	(Indonesia) J Christie	21	19	21
(Singapore) Loh K Y	17	21	11
(Japan) Y Tanaka	15	17
(China) Lu GZ	21	21
SWM	(China) Li SF	14	19
(Chinese Taipei) Lin C-y	21	21
(China) Lei LX	21	10	23
(France) C Popov	10	21	21

Second round
6	(Indonesia) J Christie	21	21
(China) Lu GZ	8	19
(Chinese Taipei) Lin C-y	16	20
(China) Lei LX	21	22

Quarter-finals
6	(Indonesia) J Christie	21	21
(China) Lei LX	17	17

=== Bottom half ===
==== Section 3 ====
First round
(Japan) K Nishimoto	15	21	24
(Denmark) R Gemke	21	12	26
(India) L Sen	21	13	21
7	(Malaysia) Lee Z J	14	21	13
(Japan) T Obayashi	21	21
(Malaysia) Leong J H	12	11
(Hong Kong) Lee C Y	17	12
3	(Denmark) A Antonsen	21	21

Second round
(Denmark) R Gemke	16	18
(India) L Sen	21	21
(Japan) T Obayashi	15	18
3	(Denmark) A Antonsen	21	21

Quarter-finals
(India) L Sen	18	15
3	(Denmark) A Antonsen	21	21

==== Section 4 ====
First round
(France) T J Popov	17	19
(Hong Kong) Ng K L	21	21
(France) A Lanier	21	18	21
8	(Chinese Taipei) Chou T-c	17	21	13
PFR	(Chinese Taipei) Su L-y	21	15	9
(China) Weng HY	19	21	21
(Japan) K Watanabe	17	21	12
2	(Denmark) V Axelsen	21	16	21

Second round
(Hong Kong) Ng K L	21	18	21
(France) A Lanier	15	21	13
(China) Weng HY	16	11
2	(Denmark) V Axelsen	21	21

Quarter-finals
(Hong Kong) Ng K L	18	11
2	(Denmark) V Axelsen	21	21

== Women's singles ==
=== Seeds ===
1. (South Korea) An Se-young (champion)
2. (China) Wang Zhiyi (second round)
3. (Japan) Akane Yamaguchi (first round)
4. (Chinese Taipei) Tai Tzu-ying (withdrew)
5. (China) Han Yue (first round)
6. (Indonesia) Gregoria Mariska Tunjung (first round)
7. (Japan) Aya Ohori (first round)
8. (Thailand) Supanida Katethong (semi-finals)

=== Finals ===
Semi-finals
1	(South Korea) An Se-young	21	22
(Japan) Tomoka Miyazaki	5	20
8	(Thailand) Supanida Katethong	16	15
(China) Gao Fangjie	21	21

Final
1	(South Korea) An Se-young	21	21
(China) Gao Fangjie	12	8

=== Top half ===
==== Section 1 ====
First round
1	(South Korea) An S-y	24	15	21
(Thailand) R Intanon	22	21	19
PFR	(United States) L Lam	10	18
(Chinese Taipei) Sung S-y	21	21
5	(China) Han Y	18	17
(China) Zhang YM	21	21
(Canada) M Li	21	21
(Malaysia) Goh J W	18	16

Second round
1	(South Korea) An S-y	21	21	21
(Chinese Taipei) Sung S-y	23	12	12
(China) Zhang YM	21	21	21
(Canada) M Li	19	23	15

Quarter-finals
1	(South Korea) An S-y	21	21
(China) Zhang YM	11	11

==== Section 2 ====
First round
3	(Japan) A Yamaguchi	21	17	17
(Denmark) M Blichfeldt	14	21	21
(India) A Kashyap	10	18
(Japan) T Miyazaki	21	21
7	(Japan) A Ohori	21	12	18
(Japan) N Nidaira	15	21	21
PFR	(India) A Upadhyaya	21	8	22
(United States) BW Zhang	17	21	20

Second round
(Denmark) M Blichfeldt	21	21	10
(Japan) T Miyazaki	17	23	21
(Japan) N Nidaira	21	21
PFR	(India) A Upadhyaya	7	14

Quarter-finals
(Japan) T Miyazaki	21	21
(Japan) N Nidaira	12	17

=== Bottom half ===
==== Section 3 ====
First round
(Singapore) Yeo J M	21	21
(Hong Kong) Lo S Y	7	18
(India) P. V. Sindhu	21	21
SWM	(Thailand) B Ongbamrungphan	17	19
(India) M Bansod	20	23	21
(Denmark) L Kjærsfeldt	22	21	16
(Germany) Y Li	14	12
8	(Thailand) S Katethong	21	21

Second round
(Singapore) Yeo J M	21	17	23
(India) P. V. Sindhu	16	21	21
(India) M Bansod	9	9
8	(Thailand) S Katethong	21	21

Quarter-finals
(Singapore) Yeo J M	14	17
8	(Thailand) S Katethong	21	21

==== Section 4 ====
First round
(South Korea) Sim Y-j	23	15
(Chinese Taipei) Lin H-t	25	21
(Thailand) P Chochuwong	21	21
6	(Indonesia) G M Tunjung	13	14
(China) Gao FJ	21	13	21
(Denmark) L Christophersen	8	21	11
(Chinese Taipei) Pai Y-p	10	7
2	(China) Wang ZY	21	21

Second round
(Chinese Taipei) Lin H-t	17	9
(Thailand) P Chochuwong	21	21
(China) Gao FJ	21	21
2	(China) Wang ZY	16	18

Quarter-finals
(Thailand) P Chochuwong	14	18
(China) Gao FJ	21	21

== Men's doubles ==
=== Seeds ===
1. (China) Liang Weikeng / Wang Chang (second round)
2. (Denmark) Kim Astrup / Anders Skaarup Rasmussen (quarter-finals)
3. (China) He Jiting / Ren Xiangyu (semi-finals)
4. (Indonesia) Fajar Alfian / Muhammad Rian Ardianto (second round)
5. (Malaysia) Aaron Chia / Soh Wooi Yik (quarter-finals)
6. (India) Satwiksairaj Rankireddy / Chirag Shetty (semi-finals)
7. (Malaysia) Goh Sze Fei / Nur Izzuddin (quarter-finals)
8. (Japan) Takuro Hoki / Yugo Kobayashi (quarter-finals)

=== Finals ===
Semi-finals
(Indonesia) Sabar Karyaman Gutama (Indonesia) Muhammad Reza Pahlevi Isfahani	21	21
3	(China) He Jiting (China) Ren Xiangyu	16	18
(South Korea) Jin Yong (South Korea) Seo Seung-jae	21	14	21
6	(India) Satwiksairaj Rankireddy (India) Chirag Shetty	18	21	16

Final
(Indonesia) Sabar Karyaman Gutama (Indonesia) Muhammad Reza Pahlevi Isfahani	16	16
(South Korea) Jin Yong (South Korea) Seo Seung-jae	21	21

=== Top half ===
==== Section 1 ====
First round
1	(China) Liang WK (China) Wang C	21	21
(China) Xie HN (China) Zeng WH	17	19
(Indonesia) S K Gutama (Indonesia) M R P Isfahani	21	21
(Indonesia) M Ahsan (Indonesia) H Setiawan	16	17
7	(Malaysia) Goh S F (Malaysia) N Izzuddin	21	21	21
(Japan) K Mitsuhashi (Japan) H Okamura	23	14	13
(Chinese Taipei) Chiu H-c (Chinese Taipei) Wang C-l	21	21
(Chinese Taipei) Lee F-c (Chinese Taipei) Lee F-j	16	17

Second round
1	(China) Liang WK (China) Wang C	10	16
(Indonesia) S K Gutama (Indonesia) M R P Isfahani	21	21
7	(Malaysia) Goh S F (Malaysia) N Izzuddin	21	21
(Chinese Taipei) Chiu H-c (Chinese Taipei) Wang C-l	18	16

Quarter-finals
(Indonesia) S K Gutama (Indonesia) M R P Isfahani	18	21	23
7	(Malaysia) Goh S F (Malaysia) N Izzuddin	21	19	21

==== Section 2 ====
First round
3	(China) He JT (China) Ren XY	21	21
(Malaysia) Choong H J (Malaysia) M Haikal	12	15
(Malaysia) J Arif (Malaysia) Yap R K	21	18	21
(China) Chen BY (China) Liu Y	17	21	16
5	(Malaysia) A Chia (Malaysia) Soh W Y	21	21
(Indonesia) M S Fikri (Indonesia) D Marthin	12	18
(Malaysia) N M Azriyn A (Malaysia) Tan W K	21	21
(Thailand) P Sukphun (Thailand) P Teeraratsakul	19	15

Second round
3	(China) He JT (China) Ren XY	21	21
(Malaysia) J Arif (Malaysia) Yap R K	10	19
5	(Malaysia) A Chia (Malaysia) Soh W Y	21	21
(Malaysia) N M Azriyn A (Malaysia) Tan W K	13	19

Quarter-finals
3	(China) He JT (China) Ren XY	25	17	21
5	(Malaysia) A Chia (Malaysia) Soh W Y	23	21	12

=== Bottom half ===
==== Section 3 ====
First round
(Malaysia) Man W C (Malaysia) Tee K W	21	19	17
(Denmark) D Lundgaard (Denmark) M Vestergaard	19	21	21
PFR	(Chinese Taipei) Chen Z-r (Chinese Taipei) Lin Y-c	18	22
8	(Japan) T Hoki (Japan) Y Kobayashi	21	24
(South Korea) Jin Y (South Korea) Seo S-j	21	21
(Chinese Taipei) Chang K-c (Chinese Taipei) Chen X-y	16	17
(Indonesia) L R Carnando (Indonesia) B Maulana	17	22	14
4	(Indonesia) F Alfian (Indonesia) M R Ardianto	21	20	21

Second round
(Denmark) D Lundgaard (Denmark) M Vestergaard	17	22	19
8	(Japan) T Hoki (Japan) Y Kobayashi	21	20	21
(South Korea) Jin Y (South Korea) Seo S-j	22	21
4	(Indonesia) F Alfian (Indonesia) M R Ardianto	20	7

Quarter-finals
8	(Japan) T Hoki (Japan) Y Kobayashi	22	15	14
(South Korea) Jin Y (South Korea) Seo S-j	20	21	21

==== Section 4 ====
First round
(Chinese Taipei) Lin B-w (Chinese Taipei) Su C-h	12	19
(Denmark) R Kjær (Denmark) F Søgaard	21	21
(Chinese Taipei) Lee J-h (Chinese Taipei) Yang P-hs	21	19	18
6	(India) S Rankireddy (India) C Shetty	12	21	21
(France) C Popov (France) T J Popov	21	17	21
(Chinese Taipei) Liu K-h (Chinese Taipei) Yang P-ha	19	21	18
(Malaysia) Ong Y S (Malaysia) Teo E Y	24	18	15
2	(Denmark) K Astrup (Denmark) A S Rasmussen	22	21	21

Second round
(Denmark) R Kjær (Denmark) F Søgaard	19	15
6	(India) S Rankireddy (India) C Shetty	21	21
(France) C Popov (France) T J Popov	16	13
2	(Denmark) K Astrup (Denmark) A S Rasmussen	21	21

Quarter-finals
6	(India) S Rankireddy (India) C Shetty	21	21
2	(Denmark) K Astrup (Denmark) A S Rasmussen	16	19

== Women's doubles ==
=== Seeds ===
1. (South Korea) Baek Ha-na / Lee So-hee (withdrew)
2. (China) Liu Shengshu / Tan Ning (champions)
3. (Japan) Nami Matsuyama / Chiharu Shida (semi-finals)
4. (Japan) Rin Iwanaga / Kie Nakanishi (second round)
5. (Malaysia) Pearly Tan / Thinaah Muralitharan (quarter-finals)
6. (China) Jia Yifan / Zhang Shuxian (quarter-finals)
7. (China) Li Yijing / Luo Xumin (final)
8. (Indonesia) Febriana Dwipuji Kusuma / Amallia Cahaya Pratiwi (quarter-finals)

=== Finals ===
Semi-finals
(Japan) Yuki Fukushima (Japan) Mayu Matsumoto	16	13
7	(China) Li Yijing (China) Luo Xumin	21	21
3	(Japan) Nami Matsuyama (Japan) Chiharu Shida	12	17
2	(China) Liu Shengshu (China) Tan Ning	21	21

Final
7	(China) Li Yijing (China) Luo Xumin	10	10
2	(China) Liu Shengshu (China) Tan Ning	21	21

=== Top half ===
==== Section 1 ====
First round
4	(Japan) R Iwanaga (Japan) K Nakanishi	25	21
(France) M Lambert (France) C Pognante	23	18
(South Korea) Jeong N-e (South Korea) Shin S-c	11	21	20
(Japan) Y Fukushima (Japan) M Matsumoto	21	16	22
6	(China) Jia YF (China) Zhang SX	21	21
(South Korea) Lee Y-w (South Korea) Lee Y-l	16	9
PFR	(Chinese Taipei) N G Chan (Chinese Taipei) Lin C-c	16	21	18
(Chinese Taipei) Chang C-h (Chinese Taipei) Yang C-t	21	14	21

Second round
4	(Japan) R Iwanaga (Japan) K Nakanishi	18	21	15
(Japan) Y Fukushima (Japan) M Matsumoto	21	15	21
6	(China) Jia YF (China) Zhang SX	21	21
(Chinese Taipei) Chang C-h (Chinese Taipei) Yang C-t	11	11

Quarter-finals
(Japan) Y Fukushima (Japan) M Matsumoto	21	22
6	(China) Jia YF (China) Zhang SX	15	20

==== Section 2 ====
First round
7	(China) Li YJ (China) Luo XM	21	21
(Chinese Taipei) Lee C-c (Chinese Taipei) Lin Y-y	14	12
(Chinese Taipei) Sung S-y (Chinese Taipei) Yu C-h	21	21
(Chinese Taipei) Cheng Y-p (Chinese Taipei) Sun Y-h	9	10
SWM	(Hong Kong) Yeung N T (Hong Kong) Yeung P L	22	10	17
(China) Li WM (China) Zheng Y	20	21	21
(South Korea) Kim H-j (South Korea) Kong H-y	21	21
(Thailand) O Jongsathapornparn (Thailand) S Suwachai	17	19

Second round
7	(China) Li YJ (China) Luo XM	16	21	21
(Chinese Taipei) Sung S-y (Chinese Taipei) Yu C-h	21	7	14
(China) Li WM (China) Zheng Y	21	13	12
(South Korea) Kim H-j (South Korea) Kong H-y	19	21	21

Quarter-finals
7	(China) Li YJ (China) Luo XM	19	21	22
(South Korea) Kim H-j (South Korea) Kong H-y	21	18	20

=== Bottom half ===
==== Section 3 ====
First round
(Japan) K Ishikawa (Japan) M Konegawa	11	21	21
(Malaysia) V Hoo (Malaysia) Lim C S	21	8	12
(Indonesia) L T Mayasari (Indonesia) S F S Ramadhanti	17	4^{r}
8	(Indonesia) F D Kusuma (Indonesia) A C Pratiwi	21	6
(Chinese Taipei) Hsieh P-s (Chinese Taipei) Hung E-t	21	21
(Chinese Taipei) Lin X-m (Chinese Taipei) Wang Y-q	19	9
(Chinese Taipei) Teng C-h (Chinese Taipei) Yang C-y	21	20	16
3	(Japan) N Matsuyama (Japan) C Shida	18	22	21

Second round
(Japan) K Ishikawa (Japan) M Konegawa	19	19
8	(Indonesia) F D Kusuma (Indonesia) A C Pratiwi	21	21
(Chinese Taipei) Hsieh P-s (Chinese Taipei) Hung E-t	10	19
3	(Japan) N Matsuyama (Japan) C Shida	21	21

Quarter-finals
8	(Indonesia) F D Kusuma (Indonesia) A C Pratiwi	12	18
3	(Japan) N Matsuyama (Japan) C Shida	21	21

==== Section 4 ====
First round
(Chinese Taipei) Hsu Y-h (Chinese Taipei) Lin J-y	21	18	18
(Japan) A Higashino (Japan) A Sakuramoto	18	21	21
(China) Ding KY (China) Wang YD	16	14
5	(Malaysia) P Tan (Malaysia) Thinaah M	21	21
(Chinese Taipei) Hu L-f (Chinese Taipei) Jheng Y-c	15	14
(India) T Jolly (India) G Gopichand	21	21
(South Korea) Kim B-r (South Korea) Kim S-y	15	7
2	(China) Liu SS (China) Tan N	21	21

Second round
(Japan) A Higashino (Japan) A Sakuramoto	18	21	13
5	(Malaysia) P Tan (Malaysia) Thinaah M	21	18	21
(India) T Jolly (India) G Gopichand	16	11
2	(China) Liu SS (China) Tan N	21	21

Quarter-finals
5	(Malaysia) P Tan (Malaysia) Thinaah M	16	17
2	(China) Liu SS (China) Tan N	21	21

== Mixed doubles ==
=== Seeds ===
1. (China) Feng Yanzhe / Huang Dongping (champions)
2. (China) Jiang Zhenbang / Wei Yaxin (second round)
3. (Hong Kong) Tang Chun Man / Tse Ying Suet (semi-finals)
4. (Malaysia) Chen Tang Jie / Toh Ee Wei (semi-finals)
5. (Malaysia) Goh Soon Huat / Shevon Jemie Lai (first round)
6. (Indonesia) Dejan Ferdinansyah / Gloria Emanuelle Widjaja (quarter-finals)
7. (China) Cheng Xing / Zhang Chi (second round)
8. (Chinese Taipei) Yang Po-hsuan / Hu Ling-fang (quarter-finals)

=== Finals ===
Semi-finals
1	(China) Feng Yanzhe (China) Huang Dongping	21	21
4	(Malaysia) Chen Tang Jie (Malaysia) Toh Ee Wei	18	13
3	(Hong Kong) Tang Chun Man (Hong Kong) Tse Ying Suet	14	21	19
(Malaysia) Hoo Pang Ron (Malaysia) Cheng Su Yin	21	17	21

Final
1	(China) Feng Yanzhe (China) Huang Dongping	21	25	21
(Malaysia) Hoo Pang Ron (Malaysia) Cheng Su Yin	23	23	16

=== Top half ===
==== Section 1 ====
First round
1	(China) Feng YZ (China) Huang DP	21	21
(Japan) H Midorikawa (Japan) N Saito	14	13
(India) B S Reddy (India) N S Reddy	23	17	21
(United States) P Smith (United States) J Gai	21	21	17
8	(Chinese Taipei) Yang P-h (Chinese Taipei) Hu L-f	21	21
(Japan) H Nishi (Japan) A Sato	12	8
(Denmark) M Vestergaard (Denmark) C Busch	22	21	16
(Thailand) S Jomkoh (Thailand) S Taerattanachai	24	16	21

Second round
1	(China) Feng YZ (China) Huang DP	w	/	o
(India) B S Reddy (India) N S Reddy
8	(Chinese Taipei) Yang P-h (Chinese Taipei) Hu L-f	21	21	21
(Thailand) S Jomkoh (Thailand) S Taerattanachai	23	12	18

Quarter-finals
1	(China) Feng YZ (China) Huang DP	21	21
8	(Chinese Taipei) Yang P-h (Chinese Taipei) Hu L-f	13	13

==== Section 2 ====
First round
4	(Malaysia) Chen T J (Malaysia) Toh E W	21	21	21
(Chinese Taipei) Ye H-w (Chinese Taipei) N G Chan	23	9	12
(France) T Gicquel (France) D Delrue	13	21	21
(China) Zhou ZH (China) Bao LJ	21	19	17
5	(Malaysia) Goh S H (Malaysia) S J Lai	9	9
(China) Guo XW (China) Chen FH	21	21
(Japan) Y Watanabe (Japan) M Taguchi	21	21
(England) G Mairs (England) J Mairs	16	16

Second round
4	(Malaysia) Chen T J (Malaysia) Toh E W	14	23	21
(France) T Gicquel (France) D Delrue	21	21	8
(China) Guo XW (China) Chen FH	21	21
(Japan) Y Watanabe (Japan) M Taguchi	12	9

Quarter-finals
4	(Malaysia) Chen T J (Malaysia) Toh E W	14	23	21
(China) Guo XW (China) Chen FH	21	21	16

=== Bottom half ===
==== Section 3 ====
First round
(Denmark) J Toft (Denmark) A Magelund	21	21
(Chinese Taipei) Wu H-y (Chinese Taipei) Yang C-y	17	15
(China) Zhang HY (China) Yang JY	17	12
6	(Indonesia) D Ferdinansyah (Indonesia) G E Widjaja	21	21
(Malaysia) Wong T C (Malaysia) Lim C S	21	21
(Algeria) K Mammeri (Algeria) T Mammeri	15	13
(Thailand) D Puavaranukroh (Thailand) S Paewsampran	13	21	17
3	(Hong Kong) Tang C M (Hong Kong) Tse Y S	21	17	21

Second round
(Denmark) J Toft (Denmark) A Magelund	15	11
6	(Indonesia) D Ferdinansyah (Indonesia) G E Widjaja	21	21
(Malaysia) Wong T C (Malaysia) Lim C S	21	15	9
3	(Hong Kong) Tang C M (Hong Kong) Tse Y S	17	21	21

Quarter-finals
6	(Indonesia) D Ferdinansyah (Indonesia) G E Widjaja	13	17
3	(Hong Kong) Tang C M (Hong Kong) Tse Y S	21	21

==== Section 4 ====
First round
(Chinese Taipei) Lin B-w (Chinese Taipei) Lin C-c	21	10	11
(Chinese Taipei) Chen C-k (Chinese Taipei) Hsu Y-h	16	21	21
(Netherlands) R Tabeling (Denmark) A Bøje	19	13
7	(China) Cheng X (China) Zhang C	21	21
(Chinese Taipei) Liu K-h (Chinese Taipei) Jheng Y-c	17	12
(Malaysia) Hoo P R (Malaysia) Cheng S Y	21	21
(Malaysia) Tan K M (Malaysia) Lai P J	18	11
2	(China) Jiang ZB (China) Wei YX	21	21

Second round
(Chinese Taipei) Chen C-k (Chinese Taipei) Hsu Y-h	22	22
7	(China) Cheng X (China) Zhang C	20	20
(Malaysia) Hoo P R (Malaysia) Cheng S Y	16	21	21
2	(China) Jiang ZB (China) Wei YX	21	14	19

Quarter-finals
(Chinese Taipei) Chen C-k (Chinese Taipei) Hsu Y-h	10	16
(Malaysia) Hoo P R (Malaysia) Cheng S Y	21	21

Preceded by 2024 Japan Masters	BWF World Tour; 2024 BWF season	Succeeded by 2024 Syed Modi International
