= Szilvia Káhn =

Hungarian table tennis player

Szilvia Kahn
Personal information
- Nationality: Hungary
- Born: December 31, 1969 (age 56)
Medal record
Representing Hungary
World Table Tennis Championships
Bronze medal – third place	1987	women's team

Szilvia Káhn (born 1969) is a female former international table tennis player from Hungary.

== Table tennis career ==
She won a bronze medal for Hungary at the 1987 World Table Tennis Championships in the Corbillon Cup (women's team event) with Csilla Bátorfi, Edit Urban, Krisztina Nagy.

== See also ==
- List of World Table Tennis Championships medalists
