= Team World =

Designation for a sports team in many competitions

World Team or Team World is a designation for a sports team in many competitions. It is usually equivalent to a "rest of the world" team, which is pitted against a particular territory.

== Competitions featuring a world team ==
Competition	Sport	Contributing regions	Notes
National Hockey League All-Star Game	Ice hockey	non-North American	1998; 1999; 2000; 2001; 2002; From 1998 to 2002, the game featured a Team World versus Team North America
Laver Cup	Tennis	non-Europe	Team Europe vs Team World
2013 CrossFit Games	CrossFit	non-USA	The 2013 edition of the CrossFit Games competition features a Team USA vs Team World
MLB All-Star Futures Game	Baseball	non-USA	Held since 1999
NBA Rising Stars Challenge	Basketball	non-USA	Format between 2015 and 2021.
NBA Africa Game 2015; NBA Africa Game 2017; NBA Africa Game 2018	Basketball	non-African	The inaugural NBA Africa Game (2015) featured Team Africa facing Team World
Continental Cup of Curling	Curling	outside of North America	Team World or Team Europe against Team North America
NBB All-Star Game	Basketball	non-Brazilian	Equipe Mundo (Team World) against Equipe Brasil (Team Brazil), based on player nationality
Arnold Palmer Cup	Golf	non-USA	Format since 2018: Team USA vs International Team; originally Team USA vs. Team Europe. All individual players are college/university golfers, with teams based on player nationalities and not the locations of the players' institutions.

Note that in the above sports there also exist national teams taking part in other competitions

== All-World's Team ==
Some "Team World" or "World Team" teams are all-star teams with rosters drawn up from the world's players as an honors project.

Team	Sport	Contributing		Era	Notes
Team	Sport	regions	leagues	Era	Notes
World Team of the 20th Century	Soccer	World	FIFA	20th century	soccer (association football) all-star team of stars of all eras of the 20th century

== See also ==
- Team North America
- Team Europe
- World XI
