= Krisztina Nagy =

Hungarian table tennis player

Personal information
- Nationality: Hungary
Medal record
Representing Hungary
World Table Tennis Championships
Bronze medal – third place	1987	women's team

Krisztina Nagy is a female former international table tennis player from Hungary.

== Table tennis career ==
She won a bronze medal for Hungary at the 1987 World Table Tennis Championships in the Corbillon Cup (women's team event) with Csilla Bátorfi, Szilvia Káhn and Edit Urban.

== See also ==
- List of World Table Tennis Championships medalists
