= Team North America (disambiguation) =

Team North America was an ice hockey team created for the 2016 World Cup of Hockey.

Team North America may also refer to:

- Team North America, a team in the 2016 Team Challenge Cup figure skating event
- Team North America, a team in the Continental Cup of Curling
- Team North America, a team in the 1998 to 2002 National Hockey League All-Star Games

== See also ==
- Team Europe
- Team World
