= Baek Soon-ae =

South Korean table tennis player

Baek Soon-Ae
Personal information
- Nationality: South Korea
Medal record
Representing South Korea
World Table Tennis Championships
Silver medal – second place	1987	women's team

Baek Soon-Ae is a female former international table tennis player from South Korea.

== Table tennis career ==
She won a silver medal for South Korea at the 1987 World Table Tennis Championships in the Corbillon Cup (women's team event) with Hong Soon-hwa, Hyun Jung-hwa, Yang Young-ja.

She also reached the quarter-finals of the mixed doubles during the 1987 World Championships.

== See also ==
- List of World Table Tennis Championships medalists
