= Hui Jun =

Chinese table tennis player

Personal information
- Full name: Hui Jun
- Nationality: China
- Born: 1963 (age 62–63)

Sport
- Sport: Table tennis
Medal record
Men's table tennis
Representing China
World Championships
Bronze medal – third place	1989 Dortmund	Doubles
Gold medal – first place	1987 New Delhi	Mixed doubles

Hui Jun (惠钧; born 1963) is a former international table tennis player from China.

== Table tennis career ==
His two World Championship medals included a gold medal in the mixed doubles with Geng Lijuan at the 1987 World Table Tennis Championships.

== Personal life ==
Hui was born in Jiangsu in 1963. His wife Li Huifen is also a table tennis player-coach. The couple later moved to Hong Kong. By 2003 Hui had become head coach of the Hong Kong table tennis team.

== See also ==
- List of table tennis players
- List of World Table Tennis Championships medalists
