= Guan Jianhua =

Chinese table tennis player

Personal information
- Nationality: China
- Born: 1962 (age 63–64)
Medal record
Representing China
World Table Tennis Championships
Bronze medal – third place	1985	Women's Doubles
Bronze medal – third place	1987	Mixed Doubles
Bronze medal – third place	1987	Women's Singles

Guan Jianhua (born 1962) is a female Chinese former international table tennis player.

== Table tennis career ==
She won three World Championship medals. She won a bronze medal at the 1985 World Table Tennis Championships in the women's doubles with Tong Ling and two more bronze medals at the 1987 World Table Tennis Championships in the mixed doubles with Wang Hao and the women's singles.

== See also ==
- List of table tennis players
- List of World Table Tennis Championships medalists
