= Edit Urban =

Hungarian table tennis player

Personal information
- Nationality: Hungary
Medal record
Representing Hungary
World Table Tennis Championships
Bronze medal – third place	1987	women's team

Edit Urban (born 27 March 1961) is a female former international table tennis player from Hungary.

== Table tennis career ==
She won a bronze medal for Hungary at the 1987 World Table Tennis Championships in the Corbillon Cup (women's team event) with Csilla Bátorfi, Szilvia Káhn and Krisztina Nagy.

She also won seven European Table Tennis Championships medals, four of which were gold, and competed in the women's singles event at the 1988 Summer Olympics.

== See also ==
- List of World Table Tennis Championships medalists
