= Wang Hao (table tennis, born 1966) =

Chinese table tennis player

Personal information
- Nationality: China
- Born: 28 November 1966 (age 59)
Medal record
Representing China
World Table Tennis Championships
Gold medal – first place	1987	Men's Team
Bronze medal – third place	1987	Mixed Doubles
Silver medal – second place	1993	Men's Team

Wang Hao (Chinese: 王浩, born 28 November 1966) is a male Chinese former international table tennis player.

He won a gold medal at the 1987 World Table Tennis Championships in the men's team, a bronze medal at the 1987 World Table Tennis Championships in the mixed doubles with Guan Jianhua and a silver medal at the 1993 World Table Tennis Championships in the men's team.

== See also ==
- List of table tennis players
- List of World Table Tennis Championships medalists
