= Leszek Kucharski =

Polish table tennis player

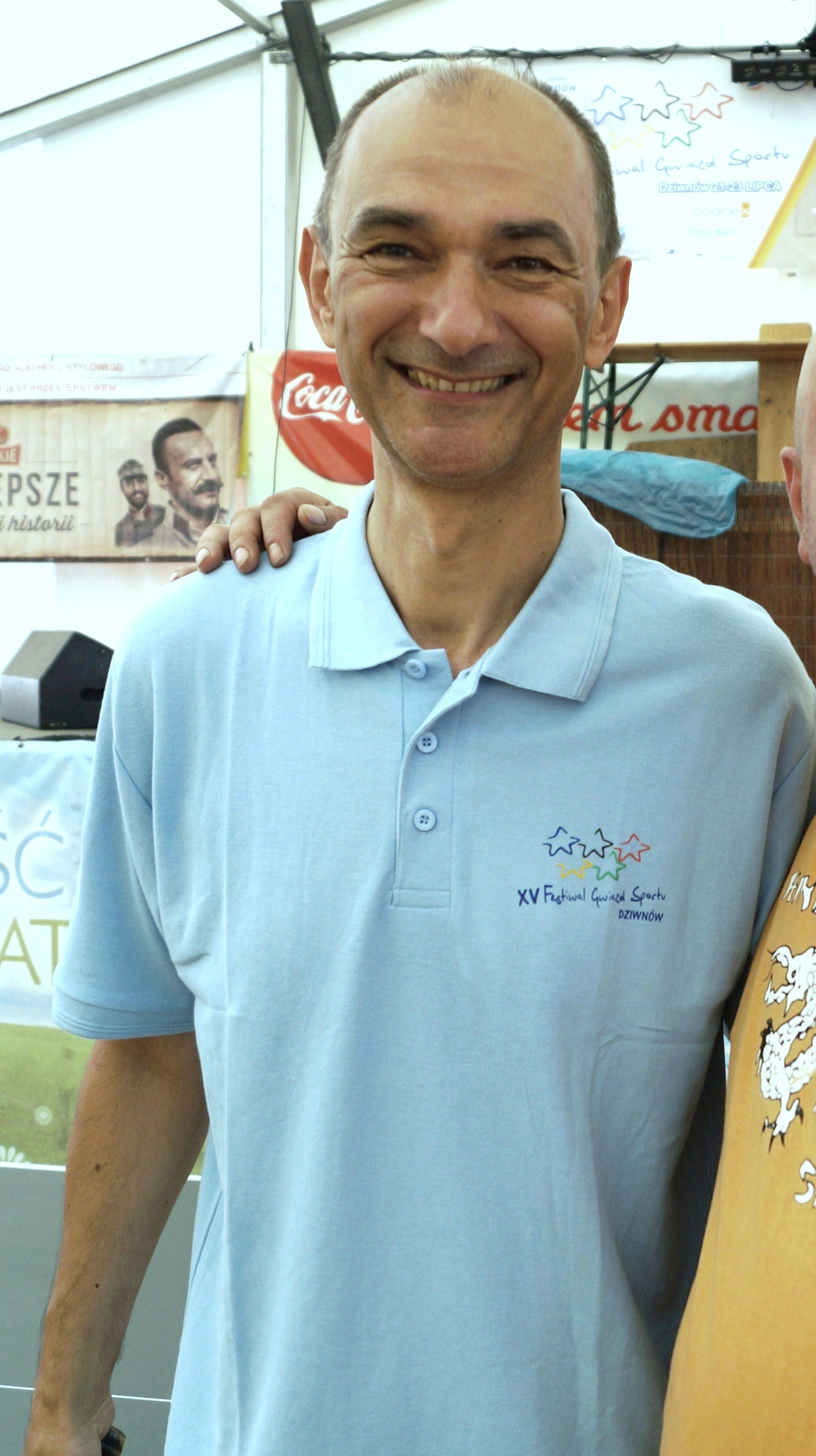
- Leszek Kucharski in 2016

Personal information
- Nationality: Poland
- Born: 8 July 1959 (age 66) Gdańsk

Achievements and titles
- Highest world ranking: 11 (end-1986–mid-1987)
Medal record
Representing Poland
World Championships
Silver medal – second place	1989 Dortmund	Doubles
Bronze medal – third place	1985 Göteborg	Team
Bronze medal – third place	1987 New Delhi	Doubles
World Cup
Bronze medal – third place	1990 Seoul	Doubles
European Championships
Silver medal – second place	1984 Moscow	Team
Silver medal – second place	1986 Prague	Singles
Bronze medal – third place	1986 Prague	Team
Bronze medal – third place	1988 Paris	Doubles

Leszek Roman Kucharski (born 8 July 1959) is a male Polish former international table tennis player.

He won a bronze medal at the 1985 World Table Tennis Championships in the Swaythling Cup (men's team event), a bronze medal at the 1987 World Table Tennis Championships in the men's doubles with Andrzej Grubba and a silver medal at the 1989 World Table Tennis Championships in the men's doubles with Zoran Kalinić. He also won two English Open titles. Kucharski was ranked world No. 11 at the end of 1986 and in mid-1987.

== See also ==
- List of table tennis players
- List of World Table Tennis Championships medalists
