= Andrzej Grubba =

Polish table tennis player (1958–2005)

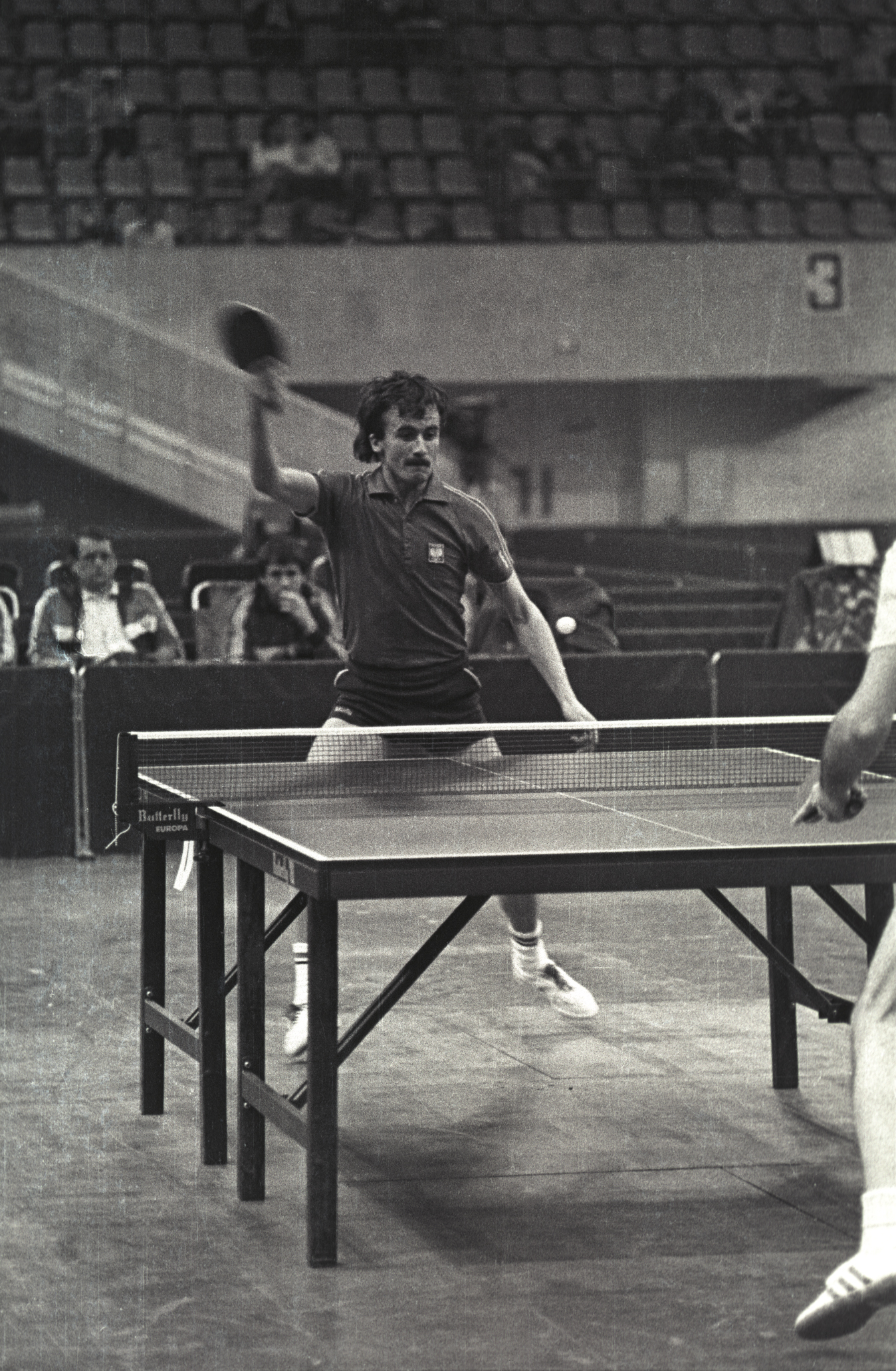

Personal information
- Full name: Andrzej Stanisław Grubba
- Nationality: Poland
- Born: 14 May 1958 Brzeźno Wielkie, Poland
- Died: 21 July 2005 (aged 47) Sopot, Poland

Sport
- Sport: Table tennis
- Highest ranking: 3 (Jun 1989–19 Dec 1991)
Medal record
Men's table tennis
Representing Poland
Event	1st	2nd	3rd
Olympic Games	0	0	0
World Championships	0	0	3
World Cup	1	2	2
European Championships	1	4	6
Total	2	8	11
World Championships
Bronze medal – third place	1985 Gothenburg	team
Bronze medal – third place	1987 New Delhi	doubles
Bronze medal – third place	1989 Dortmund	singles
World Cup
Gold medal – first place	1988 Guangzhou	singles
Silver medal – second place	1985 Foshan	singles
Silver medal – second place	1989 Nairobi	singles
Bronze medal – third place	1987 Macao	singles
Bronze medal – third place	1990 Seoul	doubles
European Championships
Gold medal – first place	1982 Budapest	mixed doubles
Silver medal – second place	1984 Moscow	singles
Silver medal – second place	1984 Moscow	team
Silver medal – second place	1988 Paris	mixed doubles
Silver medal – second place	1990 Gothenburg	singles
Silver medal – second place	1996 Bratislava	doubles
Bronze medal – third place	1984 Moscow	mixed doubles
Bronze medal – third place	1986 Prague	singles
Bronze medal – third place	1986 Prague	team
Bronze medal – third place	1988 Paris	doubles
Bronze medal – third place	1992 Stuttgart	singles
Bronze medal – third place	1996 Bratislava	team

Andrzej Stanisław Grubba (14 May 1958 – 21 July 2005) was a Polish table tennis player.

== Profile ==
Grubba was born in Brzeźno Wielkie near Starogard Gdański. He was the recipient of numerous medals for the world competition in table tennis as well as for the European competition.

He was one of the best players in this field of sport in Polish history, together with Alojzy Ehrlich. Three times he was awarded bronze medals during the World Competition - in 1989 for single play, in 1985 for team tournament, in 1987 for double play with Leszek Kucharski. Three times Grubba took part in the Olympic Games. In 1988 he won World Cup, in 1985 and 1989 he had 2nd place and in 1987 he was 3rd, in singles. In doubles Cup, with Leszek Kucharski had 3rd place. One of the things Grubba was best known for was his ability to change playing hands mid-rally. He also won two English Open titles.

Grubba was ranked world No. 3 successively for more than two and a half years from mid-1989 to the end of 1991.

== See also ==
- List of table tennis players
- List of World Table Tennis Championships medalists

Awards
Preceded by (Poland) Zdzisław Hoffmann	Polish Sportspersonality of the Year; 1984	Succeeded by (Poland) Lech Piasecki
