= Jiao Zhimin =

Chinese-South Korean table tennis player

Personal information
- Native name: 焦志敏
- Nationality: Chinese
- Born: 1 December 1963 (age 62) Yichun, Heilongjiang, China
Medal record
Women's table tennis
Representing China
Olympic Games
Silver medal – second place	1988 Seoul	Doubles
Bronze medal – third place	1988 Seoul	Singles
World Championships
Gold medal – first place	1987 New Delhi	Team
Silver medal – second place	1987 New Delhi	Mixed Doubles
Bronze medal – third place	1985 Gothenburg	Doubles
Bronze medal – third place	1985 Gothenburg	Mixed Doubles
Bronze medal – third place	1987 New Delhi	Doubles

Jiao Zhimin (Chinese: 焦志敏; pinyin: Jiāo Zhìmǐn, Korean: 자오즈민; RR: Jao Jeumin, born December 1, 1963) is a Chinese-South Korean former table tennis player. A left-handed player, she was the leading member of the Chinese women's team in the late 1980s.She won a bronze medal in women's singles and a silver medal in women's doubles at the 1988 Seoul Olympic Games. At the World Championships, she won a gold medal with China's team in 1987 and bronze medals in women's doubles in 1985 and 1987.

Jiao's romance with the South Korean player Ahn Jae-hyung, whom she married in Sweden in 1989 before China and South Korea established diplomatic relations, attracted wide attention in both countries. After her marriage, she acquired South Korean nationality, worked in Korean media and briefly acted in television dramas before founding businesses in China.

== Early life ==
Jiao was born on December 1, 1963, in Yichun, Heilongjiang.

== Sports career ==
Jiao played table tennis left-handed and became the leading player of the Chinese women's team after the retirement of Cao Yanhua. In 1984, she competed at the Asian Table Tennis Championships in Islamabad, Pakistan, where she met Ahn Jae-hyung.

At the 1985 World Championships in Gothenburg, Jiao won bronze medals in women's doubles and mixed doubles. At the 1986 Asian Games in Seoul, China's men's and women's teams both lost, and rumors circulated that Jiao had passed information to the South Koreans, according to The Paper. A 2015 article in the same publication stated that she won the women's singles title at the Games, defeating South Korea's Yang Young-ja in the final. At the 1987 World Championships in New Delhi, she was a member of China's winning women's team and was runner-up in the mixed doubles. She also won a second bronze medal in women's doubles.

At the 1988 Summer Olympics in Seoul, Jiao won all five of her group matches in the women's singles and finished first in her group. She then defeated Japan's Mika Hoshino 3–2 and North Korea's Hong Cha-ok 3–0, before losing 0–3 to her teammate Li Huifen in the semi-finals. She beat Marie Hrachová 3–0 to take the bronze medal. The Paper later wrote that she finished with only a bronze medal because of an incident in which she conceded a match. In the women's doubles, she and Chen Jing won all six of their group matches and beat Hungary and Yugoslavia in the knockout rounds. They lost the final 1–2 to the South Korean pair of Hyun Jung-hwa and Yang Young-ja and took the silver medal.

== Personal life ==
After the Olympics, Jiao retired from table tennis at the age of 26 and moved to Sweden, where Ahn joined her. The couple married in Sweden in 1989, three years before China and South Korea established diplomatic relations. Asiaweek dated the wedding to December 1989. Their marriage generated intense coverage in the South Korean media. The Paper wrote that the wedding became a political event and that the South Korean government provided major support for it. Some accounts state that the couple first met at the 1986 Asian Games rather than at the 1984 Asian Championships. Jiao and Ahn have one son, An Byeong-hun, who was born on September 17, 1991. He became a professional golfer and won the U.S. Amateur in 2009 at the age of 17, the youngest winner in the event's history. He has said that he speaks mainly Chinese with his mother.

== Later life ==
By 1996, Jiao had also appeared as an actress in a South Korean television mini-series. She told Asiaweek that acting was "very hard, especially since my Korean isn't that good yet", and that she would like to become a coach. In September 2002, she made a surprise appearance in Ling Ling, a two-part MBC special drama marking the tenth anniversary of diplomatic relations between South Korea and China. The drama aired on September 11 and 12, with Han Xiao in the title role and Lee Dong-gun as a singer-songwriter, and Jiao played Ling Ling's older sister.

Jiao ran a trading company, Zhao International Trade, in the early 2000s. In a September 2000 interview with the South China Morning Post, Jiao was reported as saying that Korean men were chauvinists, and she posted an apology on her website on September 16, saying that the article had distorted her words. When KBS appointed her as a table tennis commentator for the 2002 Asian Games in Busan, viewers protested over the remarks, and she withdrew from the role, citing her business commitments in China. In 2002, she founded an information consulting company in Beijing, which The Paper described as the first company to bring Korean ringtone services to China. She later served as the company's chairman. She also opened a Korean restaurant and a fashion store in Harbin. In 2005, Ahn moved with their son to the United States so that he could train at a golf academy in Florida, while Jiao stayed in China and took a corporate job.

Jiao acquired South Korean nationality, and in 2002 she stated that this had happened when the marriage was registered. After settling in Seoul, she stopped playing table tennis, saying that she had played for 18 years in China. She worked as a television and newspaper reporter and as a model.

In 2010, Jiao was appointed a public relations ambassador for Jeju Island. She has hosted a sports talk show on Chinese television. Following the outbreak of the COVID-19 pandemic in 2020, she returned to South Korea. In July 2026, the couple's story was featured on the SBS programme Kkokkomu, in which Jiao said that she had staked her life on the marriage like a gamble. In September 2026, she visited the Korean International School in Beijing, where she coached students in table tennis and gave a lecture.
