= Ahn Jae-hyung =

South Korean table tennis player (born 1965)

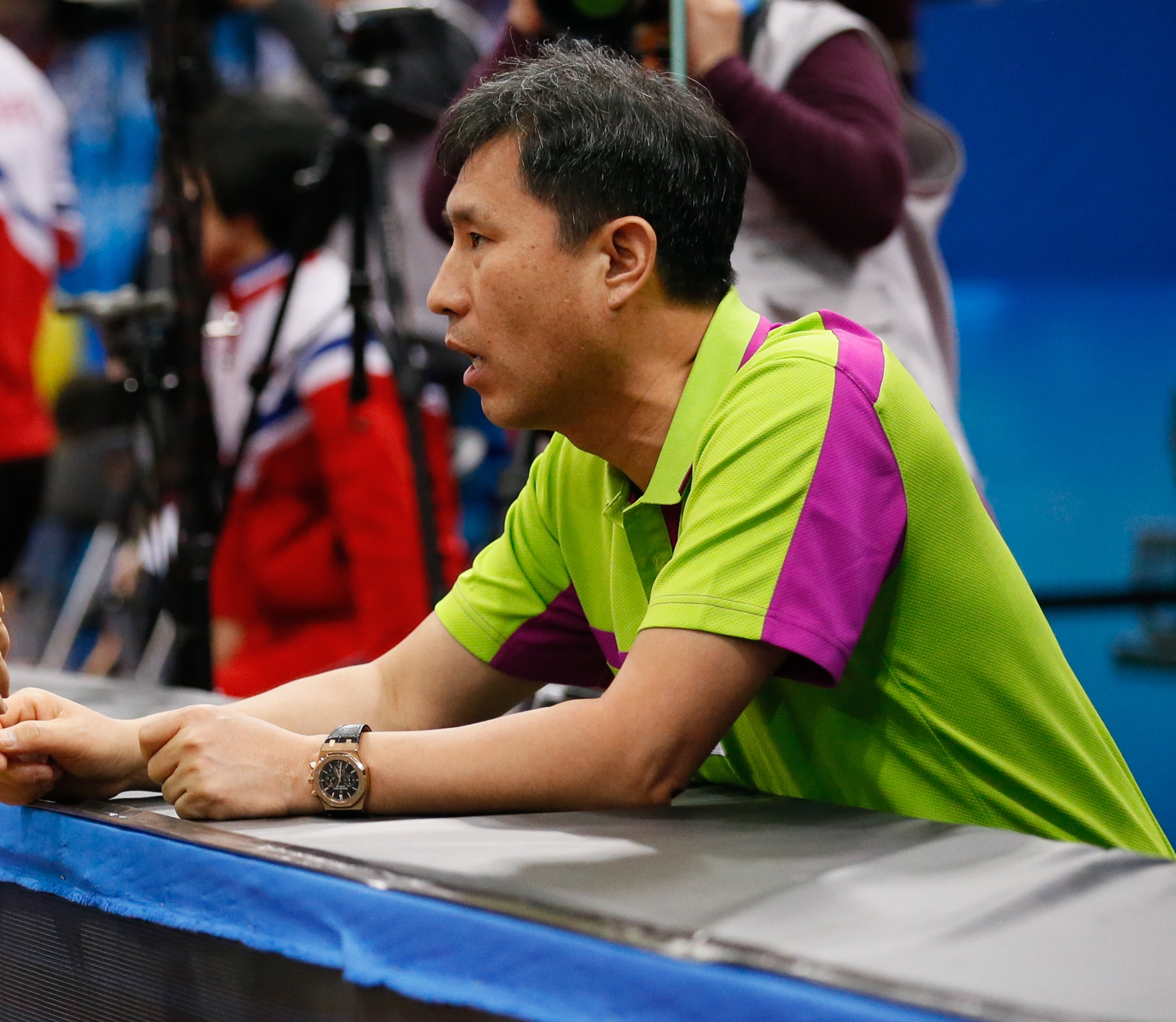

Personal information
- Nationality: South Korea
- Born: 8 January 1965 (age 61)

Sport
- Sport: Table tennis
Medal record
Men's table tennis
Representing South Korea
Olympic Games
Bronze medal – third place	1988 Seoul	Doubles
World Championships
Bronze medal – third place	1987 New Delhi	Doubles
Bronze medal – third place	1987 New Delhi	Mixed Doubles
Asian Championships
Bronze medal – third place	1988 Niigata	Doubles

- Ahn Jae-hyung
- Hangul: 안재형
- Hanja: 安宰亨
- RR: An Jaehyeong
- MR: An Chaehyŏng

Ahn Jae-hyung (Korean: 안재형; Hanja: 安宰亨; born January 8, 1965) is a male former table tennis player from South Korea who competed in the 1988 Summer Olympics.

Since 2017 he has been the head coach of South Korea's women's national team.

He married Chinese table tennis player Jiao Zhimin in 1989. The couple's son, golfer An Byeong-hun, became the youngest champion in United States Amateur Championship history, winning the 2009 event at the age of 17.

== See also ==
- List of table tennis players
