= Jiang Jialiang =

Chinese table tennis player

Personal information
- Nationality: China
- Born: 3 March 1964 (age 62) Zhongshan, Guangdong, China

Sport
- Sport: Table tennis
Medal record
Men's table tennis
Representing China
World Championships
Gold medal – first place	1983 Tokyo	Team
Gold medal – first place	1985 Gothenburg	Singles
Gold medal – first place	1985 Gothenburg	Team
Gold medal – first place	1987 New Delhi	Singles
Gold medal – first place	1987 New Delhi	Team
Silver medal – second place	1983 Tokyo	Doubles
Silver medal – second place	1987 New Delhi	Mixed Doubles
Silver medal – second place	1989 Dortmund	Team
Bronze medal – third place	1983 Tokyo	Singles
Bronze medal – third place	1985 Gothenburg	Doubles
World Cup
Gold medal – first place	1984 Kuala Lumpur	Singles
Silver medal – second place	1986 Port of Spain	Singles
Silver medal – second place	1987 Macao	Singles
Bronze medal – third place	1985 Foshan	Singles
Bronze medal – third place	1988 Canton & Wuhan	Singles
Asian Championships
Gold medal – first place	1982 Jakarta	Mixed Doubles
Gold medal – first place	1982 Jakarta	Team
Gold medal – first place	1986 Shenzhen	Singles
Gold medal – first place	1986 Shenzhen	Team
Gold medal – first place	1988 Niigata	Team
Silver medal – second place	1982 Jakarta	Doubles
Silver medal – second place	1988 Niigata	Mixed Doubles
Bronze medal – third place	1986 Shenzhen	Doubles
Bronze medal – third place	1988 Niigata	Singles

Jiang Jialiang (Chinese: 江嘉良; born 3 March 1964) is a male former international table tennis player from China. He competed at the 1988 Summer Olympics.

== Table tennis career ==
From 1982 to 1989 he won many medals in singles, doubles, and team events in the Asian Table Tennis Championships, in the Table Tennis World Cup, and in the World Table Tennis Championships. Since his retirement, Jiang has served as a color commentator for table tennis sporting events on Hong Kong television station TVB.

The ten World Championship medals included five gold medals; two in the men's singles at the 1985 World Table Tennis Championships and 1987 World Table Tennis Championships and three in the men's team event.

== ITTF Legends Tour ==
In 2014 and 2015, Jiang participated in the ITTF Legend Tour which featured table tennis legends such as Jan-Ove Waldner, Jean-Michel Saive and Jean-Philippe Gatien.

== See also ==
- List of table tennis players
- List of World Table Tennis Championships medalists
