= Kim Ki-taik =

South Korean table tennis player (born 1962)

Personal information
- Full name: Kim Ki-taik
- Nationality: South Korea
- Born: 3 October 1962 (age 63)

Sport
- Sport: Table tennis
Medal record
Men's table tennis
Representing South Korea
Olympic Games
Silver medal – second place	1988 Seoul	Singles
Asian Championships
Bronze medal – third place	1984 Islamabad	Doubles
Bronze medal – third place	1988 Niigata	Doubles

Kim Ki-taik (Korean: 김기택; Hanja: 金琦澤; born October 3, 1962) is a former table tennis player from South Korea who competed in the 1988 Summer Olympics. In 1988 he won the silver medal in the men's singles.

== See also ==
- List of table tennis players
