= Teng Yi =

Chinese table tennis player

Personal information
- Full name: Teng Yi
- Nationality: China
- Born: 1964 (age 61–62)

Sport
- Sport: Table tennis
Medal record
Men's table tennis
Representing China
World Championships
Bronze medal – third place	1989 Dortmund	Doubles
Silver medal – second place	1989 Dortmund	Team
Bronze medal – third place	1987 New Delhi	Singles
Gold medal – first place	1987 New Delhi	Team
Bronze medal – third place	1985 Gothenburg	Singles
World Cup
Gold medal – first place	1987 Macao	Singles
Asian Championships
Silver medal – second place	1986 Shenzhen	Singles
Gold medal – first place	1986 Shenzhen	Doubles
Bronze medal – third place	1986 Shenzhen	Mixed Doubles
Gold medal – first place	1986 Shenzhen	Team
Gold medal – first place	1984 Islamabad	Doubles
Gold medal – first place	1984 Islamabad	Team

Teng Yi (Chinese: 滕義) is a male former international table tennis player from China.

== Table tennis career ==
From 1985 to 1989 he won several medals in singles, doubles, and team events in the Asian Table Tennis Championships and five medals in the World Table Tennis Championships. He also won the gold medal in the Table Tennis World Cup of 1987 in Macao.

The five World Championship medals included a gold medal in the team event for China.

He also won two English Open titles.

== See also ==
- List of table tennis players
- List of World Table Tennis Championships medalists
