= Chen Jing (table tennis) =

Taiwanese table tennis player

Personal information
- Nationality: China; Republic of China
- Born: 20 September 1968 (age 57) Wuhan, China
- Education: South China Normal University
- Height: 5 ft 7 in (170 cm)

Sport
- Sport: Table tennis
Medal record
Women's table tennis
Representing Chinese Taipei
Olympic Games
Silver medal – second place	1996 Atlanta	Singles
Bronze medal – third place	2000 Sydney	Singles
World Championships
Silver medal – second place	1993 Gothenburg	Singles
Silver medal – second place	2000 Kuala Lumpur	Team
Bronze medal – third place	1997 Manchester	Mixed Doubles
Asian Championships
Bronze medal – third place	1998 Osaka	Singles
Representing China
Olympic Games
Gold medal – first place	1988 Seoul	Singles
Silver medal – second place	1988 Seoul	Doubles
World Championships
Gold medal – first place	1987 New Delhi	Team
Gold medal – first place	1989 Dortmund	Team
Silver medal – second place	1989 Dortmund	Doubles
Bronze medal – third place	1989 Dortmund	Singles
Bronze medal – third place	1989 Dortmund	Mixed Doubles
Asian Championships
Bronze medal – third place	1986 Shenzhen	Doubles

Chen Jing (Chinese: 陈静; pinyin: Chén Jìng; born 20 September 1968 in Wuhan, Hubei) is a retired table tennis player and Olympic champion for China, and later Olympic medalist for Chinese Taipei.

== Early life ==
Chen Jing was born on September 20, 1968, in Wuhan, Hubei Province. At the age of 11, she was the champion of the youth bracket in a table tennis tournament hosted by the Children's Palace in Wuhan, and was selected for the Hubei Province team. At the age of 18, she was selected for the Chinese national team.

== Professional career ==
She received a golden medal in singles and a silver medal in doubles at the 1988 Summer Olympics in Seoul.

In 1991, she defected to Taiwan after failing to make the national team in 1990, where she won the Taiwanese national table tennis competition and joined the Taiwanese national team. Competing for Chinese Taipei, she received a silver medal at the 1996 Summer Olympics in Atlanta, the first medal for Taiwan in the table tennis category. She received a bronze medal at the 2000 Summer Olympics in Sydney.

== Personal life ==
In 1992, she started studying at Princeton University, where she assumed a position as the coach of the Princeton table tennis team and studied English. After the 1996 Olympics, she returned to Taipei Physical Education College to obtain her master's degree. In 2003, she started studying at South China Normal University to obtain her doctorate in sports psychology.

== See also ==
- List of table tennis players
- List of World Table Tennis Championships medalists
- Chire Koyama
