= He Zhili =

Chinese-Japanese table tennis player

He Zhili (Chire Koyama)
Personal information
- Native name: 何智丽
- Nationality: China, then Japan
- Born: 30 September 1964 (age 62) Shanghai, China

Sport
- Sport: Table tennis
Medal record
Women's table tennis
Representing Japan
Asian Games
Gold medal – first place	1994 Hiroshima	Singles
Asian Championships
Gold medal – first place	1996 Kallang	Singles
Bronze medal – third place	1998 Osaka	Singles
Representing China
World Championships
Gold medal – first place	1985 Gothenburg	Team
Gold medal – first place	1987 New Delhi	Singles
Gold medal – first place	1987 New Delhi	Team
Bronze medal – third place	1987 New Delhi	Doubles
Asian Games
Silver medal – second place	1986 Seoul	Singles
Silver medal – second place	1986 Seoul	Doubles
Silver medal – second place	1986 Seoul	Team
Asian Championships
Gold medal – first place	1984 Islamabad	Singles
Gold medal – first place	1984 Islamabad	Team
Gold medal – first place	1986 Shenzhen	Singles
Gold medal – first place	1986 Shenzhen	Doubles
Gold medal – first place	1986 Shenzhen	Team
Gold medal – first place	1988 Niigata	Singles
Silver medal – second place	1984 Islamabad	Mixed Doubles
Bronze medal – third place	1988 Niigata	Doubles

He Zhili (simplified Chinese: 何智丽; traditional Chinese: 何智麗; pinyin: Hé Zhìlì; born 30 September 1964 in Shanghai), also known by her married name Chire Koyama (小山 ちれ, Koyama Chire), is a former table tennis world champion from China who later naturalized as a Japanese citizen and represented Japan under her married name.

== Career ==
=== Asian Games ===
Representing China as He Zhili, she was the runner-up in both singles and doubles at the Seoul Games in 1986. Koyama won the 1994 Asian Games singles title in Hiroshima, Japan playing for her adopted country.

=== Asian Championships ===
She won gold in singles and silver in mixed doubles at the 7th Asian Championships held in 1983 in Islamabad, Pakistan.

=== World Championships ===
Representing China, she won the singles and team gold during the 1987 World Championships in New Delhi, India. However, she left the national team soon after as a result of her decision to not throw away matches to her teammates. The 1987 world championship semi-finals featured 3 Chinese women and the Korean Yang Young-Ja. In the first semi-final, China's Dai Lily led 18–12 in the final set but she blew the lead and lost 21–18 to Yang Young-Ja. It is alleged that the Chinese coaches (Zhang, Xielin) thought that Guan Jianhua had a better chance of beating Yang Young-Ja in the final, and ordered He Zhili to lose the semi-final. She refused to obey the order and won the match. The Chinese coaches had no option but to support her in the final to increase the country's tally of medals. Though He Zhili beat Yang Young-Ja, she left the team because of the incident and migrated to Japan.

=== Olympic Games ===
Koyama represented Japan at the 1996 Atlanta Games and 2000 Sydney Games. She reached the quarter final stage (singles) in both games.

== Marriage ==
He Zhili married and later divorced, Hideyuki Koyama, a Japanese national and settled in Japan. She adopted her husband's surname (her given name “Chire” is the Japanese pronunciation of the same Chinese characters of “Zhili”).
