= Li Huifen =

Chinese table tennis player

Personal information
- Nationality: Chinese
- Born: 14 October 1963 (age 62)
Medal record
Women's table tennis
Representing China
Olympic Games
Silver medal – second place	1988 Seoul	Single

Li Huifen (Chinese: 李惠芬; born October 14, 1963) is a Chinese table tennis player. She won a silver medal in the 1988 Seoul Olympic Games in women's singles.

She also won two English Open titles.

In her 15-year athletic career, she won a total of 37 gold medals, 16 silver and 16 bronze.

She is now the Hong Kong women's table tennis team coach. Her husband Hui Jun is also a table tennis player-coach.
