= Dai Lili =

Chinese table tennis player

Personal information
- Full name: Dai Lili
- Nationality: China
- Born: 1964 (age 61–62)

Sport
- Sport: Table tennis
Medal record
Women's table tennis
Representing China
World Championships
Gold medal – first place	1983 Tokyo	Doubles
Gold medal – first place	1985 Gothenburg	Doubles
Gold medal – first place	1985 Gothenburg	Team
Gold medal – first place	1987 New Delhi	Team
Silver medal – second place	1987 New Delhi	Doubles
Bronze medal – third place	1985 Gothenburg	Singles
Bronze medal – third place	1987 New Delhi	Singles

Dai Lili (Chinese: 戴丽丽) is a former international table tennis player from China.

== Table tennis career ==
From 1982 to 1988 she won several medals in singles, doubles, and team events in the Asian Table Tennis Championships and in the World Table Tennis Championships.

Her seven World Championship medals included four gold medals; two in the team event and two in the doubles with Geng Lijuan and Shen Jianping.

She also won an English Open title.

== See also ==
- List of table tennis players
- List of World Table Tennis Championships medalists
