= Yang Young-ja =

South Korean table tennis player

Personal information
- Born: 6 July 1964 (age 61) Iksan, Jeollabuk-do, South Korea
- Height: 1.66 m (5 ft 5 in)
- Weight: 59 kg (130 lb)

Korean name
- Hangul: 양영자
- Hanja: 梁英子
- RR: Yang Yeongja
- MR: Yang Yŏngja

Sport
- Sport: Table tennis
Medal record
Representing South Korea
Olympic Games
Gold medal – first place	1988 Seoul	Doubles
World Championships
Gold medal – first place	1987 New Delhi	Doubles
Silver medal – second place	1983 Tokyo	Singles
Silver medal – second place	1987 New Delhi	Singles
Silver medal – second place	1987 New Delhi	Team
Bronze medal – third place	1985 Gothenburg	Team
Bronze medal – third place	1987 New Delhi	Mixed doubles
Asian Games
Gold medal – first place	1986 Seoul	Team
Silver medal – second place	1982 New Delhi	Team
Bronze medal – third place	1982 New Delhi	Singles
Bronze medal – third place	1986 Seoul	Singles
Bronze medal – third place	1986 Seoul	Doubles
Bronze medal – third place	1986 Seoul	Mixed Doubles

Yang Young-ja (Korean: 양영자; born July 6, 1964) is a retired female table tennis player from South Korea.

== Table tennis career ==
She won gold medals in women's doubles at the 1987 ITTF World Championships and the 1988 Summer Olympics, together with Hyun Jung-Hwa. She is also a two-time women's singles world champion runner-up in 1983 and 1987.

She retired right after the 1988 Summer Olympics, and currently resides in Seoul working as a table tennis coach responsible for the junior team of South Korea.

== See also ==
- List of table tennis players
- List of World Table Tennis Championships medalists
