= List of Asian Table Tennis Championships medalists =

== Results of TTFA Events ==
=== Winners of TTFA Asian Championships (1952 - 1970) ===
| Year | Team | | Singles | | Doubles | | |
| Year | Men's | Women's | Men's | Women's | Men's | Women's | Mixed |
|---|---|---|---|---|---|---|---|
| 1952; Singapore | Hong Kong | Hong Kong; Macau | (Hong Kong) Suh Sui Cho | (India) Gool Nasikwala | (Hong Kong) Fu Chi Fong (Hong Kong) Suh Sui Cho | (India) Gool Nasikwala (Japan) Yoshiko Tanaka | (India) Kalyanpur Jayant (India) Gool Nasikwala |
| 1953; Tokyo | Japan | Japan | (South Vietnam) Mai Văn Hòa | (Taiwan) Chen Pao-Poe | (South Vietnam) Mai Văn Hòa (South Vietnam) Trần Cảnh Được | (Japan) Reiko Ishihara (Japan) Tomie Nishimura | (Japan) Kichii Tamasu (Japan) Yoshiko Tanaka |
| 1954; Singapore | Hong Kong | Hong Kong | (South Vietnam) Mai Văn Hòa | (Hong Kong) Bao Guio Wong Bik Yiu | (Singapore) Loh Heng Chew (Singapore) Poon Weng Hoe | (Hong Kong) Bao Guio Wong Bik Yiu (Hong Kong) Lau Wai Lim | (South Korea) Rhee Kyong-Ho (South Korea) Wie Sang-Sook |
| 1957; Manila | South Vietnam | Taiwan | (Hong Kong) Lau Sek Fong | (South Korea) Choi Kyong Ja | (South Vietnam) Mai Văn Hòa (South Vietnam) Trần Cảnh Được | (Taiwan) Chen Pao-Poe (Taiwan) Shei Chang Chai-Wung | (Hong Kong) Suh Sui Cho (Hong Kong) Bao Guio Wong Bik Yiu |
| 1960; Bombay | Japan | Japan | (Japan) Ichiro Ogimura | (Japan) Kazuko Ito-Yamaizumi | (Japan) Teruo Murakami (Japan) Ichiro Ogimura | (Japan) Kazuko Ito-Yamaizumi (Japan) Kimiyo Matsuzaki | (Japan) Ichiro Ogimura (Japan) Kimiyo Matsuzaki |
| 1963; Manila | Japan | Japan | (Japan) Hiroshi Takahashi | (Japan) Kimiyo Matsuzaki | (Japan) Manji Fukushima (Japan) Hiroshi Takahashi | (Japan) Kimiyo Matsuzaki (Japan) Masako Seki | (Japan) Manji Fukushima (Japan) Kazuko Ito-Yamaizumi |
| 1964; Seoul | Japan | Japan | (Japan) Koji Kimura | (Japan) Masako Seki | (Japan) Koji Kimura (Japan) Ken Konaka | (Japan) Naoko Fukazu (Japan) Masako Seki | (Japan) Ken Konaka (Japan) Naoko Fukazu |
| 1967; Singapore | Japan | Japan | (Japan) Nobuhiko Hasegawa | (South Korea) Yoon Ki-Sook | (Japan) Shigeo Itoh (Japan) Mitsuru Kohno | (Japan) Saeko Hirota (Japan) Sachiko Morisawa | (Japan) Tetsuo Inoue (Japan) Mieko Hirano |
| 1968; Jakarta | Japan | South Korea | (Japan) Mitsuru Kohno | (Japan) Yukie Ohzeki | (Japan) Nobuhiko Hasegawa (Japan) Tokio Tasaka | (Japan) Mieko Fukuno (Japan) Yukie Ohzeki | (Japan) Shigeo Itoh (M) (Japan) Mitsuru Kohno (M) (Japan) Mieko Fukuno (F) |
| 1970; Nagoya | Japan | South Korea | (Japan) Nobuhiko Hasegawa | (Japan) Toshiko Kowada | (Japan) Nobuhiko Hasegawa (Japan) Shigeo Itoh | (Japan) Setsuko Kobori (Japan) Yukiko Onuma | (Japan) Nobuhiko Hasegawa (Japan) Toshiko Kowada |

=== Results of Individual Events ===
The tables below are Asian Table Tennis Champions lists of individual events (Men's and Women's Singles, Men's and Women's Doubles and Mixed).

=== Men's singles ===
| Year | Host City | Gold | Silver | Bronze |
|---|---|---|---|---|
| 1952 | Singapore | (Hong Kong) Suh Sui Cho | (Japan) Hiroji Satoh | (Hong Kong) Chung Chin Sing |
| 1952 | Singapore | (Hong Kong) Suh Sui Cho | (Japan) Hiroji Satoh | (Hong Kong) Fu Chi Fong |
| 1953 | Tokyo | (South Vietnam) Mai Văn Hòa | (Japan) Ichiro Ogimura | (Japan) Kazuo Kawai |
| 1953 | Tokyo | (South Vietnam) Mai Văn Hòa | (Japan) Ichiro Ogimura | (Japan) Yoshio Tomita |
| 1954 | Singapore | (South Vietnam) Mai Văn Hòa | (Philippines) D. Aguesin | |
| 1957 | Manila | (Hong Kong) Lau Sek Fong | (Taiwan) Shu Long-shung | |
| 1960 | Bombay | (Japan) Ichiro Ogimura | (South Korea) Lee Dal Joon | |
| 1963 | Manila | (Japan) Hiroshi Takahashi | | |
| 1964 | Seoul | (Japan) Koji Kimura | (Japan) Ken Konaka | (Japan) Hiroaki Ohhashi |
| 1964 | Seoul | (Japan) Koji Kimura | (Japan) Ken Konaka | (Japan) Hiroshi Takahashi |
| 1967 | Singapore | (Japan) Nobuhiko Hasegawa | (Japan) Mitsuru Kono | |
| 1968 | Jakarta | (Japan) Mitsuru Kono | (Japan) Shigeo Itoh | (Japan) Nobuhiko Hasegawa |
| 1968 | Jakarta | (Japan) Mitsuru Kono | (Japan) Shigeo Itoh | (Japan) Tokio Tasaka |
| 1970 | Nagoya | (Japan) Nobuhiko Hasegawa | (Japan) Tokio Tasaka | (Japan) Katsuyuki Abe |
| 1970 | Nagoya | (Japan) Nobuhiko Hasegawa | (Japan) Tokio Tasaka | (Japan) Shigeo Itoh |

=== Women's singles ===
| Year | Host City | Gold | Silver | Bronze |
|---|---|---|---|---|
| 1952 | Singapore | (India) Gool Nasikwala | (Hong Kong) Baguio Wong | (Japan) Yoshiko Tanaka |
| 1952 | Singapore | (India) Gool Nasikwala | (Hong Kong) Baguio Wong | (Hong Kong) M. Hayes |
| 1953 | Tokyo | (Taiwan) Chen Pao-pei | (Japan) Kiiko Watanabe | (Japan) Sae Kama |
| 1953 | Tokyo | (Taiwan) Chen Pao-pei | (Japan) Kiiko Watanabe | (Taiwan) Yao Chu |
| 1954 | Singapore | (Hong Kong) Baguio Wong | (South Korea) Hwang Yool-ja | |
| 1957 | Manila | (South Korea) Choi Kyung-ja | (South Korea) Wie Sang-sook | |
| 1960 | Bombay | (Japan) Kazuko Ito-Yamaizumi | (Japan) Yoshiko Murakami | |
| 1963 | Manila | (Japan) Kimiyo Matsuzaki | | |
| 1964 | Seoul | (Japan) Masako Seki | (Japan) Tsunao Isomura | (South Korea) Choi Kyung-ja |
| 1964 | Seoul | (Japan) Masako Seki | (Japan) Tsunao Isomura | (Japan) Masako Ohta |
| 1967 | Singapore | (South Korea) Yoon Ki-sook | (South Korea) Choi Jung-sook | |
| 1968 | Jakarta | (Japan) Yukie Ozeki | (South Korea) Choi Jung-sook | (Japan) Toshiko Kowada |
| 1968 | Jakarta | (Japan) Yukie Ozeki | (South Korea) Choi Jung-sook | (Japan) Sachiko Morisawa |
| 1970 | Nagoya | (Japan) Toshiko Kowada | (Japan) Yasuko Konno | (Japan) Miho Hamada |
| 1970 | Nagoya | (Japan) Toshiko Kowada | (Japan) Yasuko Konno | (Japan) Emiko Ohba |

=== Men's doubles ===
| Year | Host City | Gold | Silver | Bronze |
|---|---|---|---|---|
| 1952 | Singapore | (Hong Kong) Fu Chi Fong (Hong Kong) Suh Sui Cho | (India) Randir Bhandari (India) Kalyanpur Jayant | (Japan) Tadaki Hayashi (Japan) Keisuke Tsunoda |
| 1952 | Singapore | (Hong Kong) Fu Chi Fong (Hong Kong) Suh Sui Cho | (India) Randir Bhandari (India) Kalyanpur Jayant | (India) D.P. Sampat (India) Thangsvelu Thiruvangadam |
| 1953 | Tokyo | (South Vietnam) Mai Văn Hòa (South Vietnam) Trần Cảnh Được | (Japan) K. Furusawa (Japan) Tsuneo Naka | |
| 1954 | Singapore | (Singapore) Loh Heng Chew (Singapore) Poon Weng Hoe | (South Vietnam) Mai Văn Hòa (South Vietnam) Trần Cảnh Được | |
| 1957 | Manila | (South Vietnam) Mai Văn Hòa (South Vietnam) Trần Cảnh Được | (South Vietnam) Nguyen Kim Hang (South Vietnam) Trần Văn Liễu | |
| 1960 | Bombay | (Japan) Teruo Murakami (Japan) Ichiro Ogimura | (Japan) Nobuya Hoshino (Japan) Goro Shibutani | |
| 1963 | Manila | (Japan) Manji Fukushima (Japan) Hiroshi Takahashi | | |
| 1964 | Seoul | (Japan) Koji Kimura (Japan) Ken Konaka | (Japan) Hiroaki Ohhashi (Japan) Hiroshi Takahashi | (Taiwan) Chuang Ching-ye (Taiwan) Sheh Ching-po |
| 1964 | Seoul | (Japan) Koji Kimura (Japan) Ken Konaka | (Japan) Hiroaki Ohhashi (Japan) Hiroshi Takahashi | (South Korea) Kim Chung-yong (South Korea) Yoo Chin-kyu |
| 1967 | Singapore | (Japan) Shigeo Itoh (Japan) Mitsuru Kono | (Japan) Nobuhiko Hasegawa (Japan) Hajime Kagimoto | |
| 1968 | Jakarta | (Japan) Nobuhiko Hasegawa (Japan) Tokio Tasaka | (Japan) Shigeo Itoh (Japan) Mitsuru Kono | |
| 1970 | Nagoya | (Japan) Nobuhiko Hasegawa (Japan) Shigeo Itoh | (Japan) Katsuyuki Abe (Japan) Tokio Tasaka | |

=== Women's doubles ===
| Year | Host City | Gold | Silver | Bronze |
|---|---|---|---|---|
| 1952 | Singapore | (India) Gool Nasikwala (Japan) Yoshiko Tanaka | (Hong Kong) Baguio Wong (Hong Kong) Wong Oi Lau | |
| 1953 | Tokyo | (Japan) Reiko Ishihara (Japan) Tomie Nishimura | (Japan) Fujie Eguchi (Japan) Kiiko Watanabe | |
| 1954 | Singapore | (Hong Kong) Lau Wai Lim (Hong Kong) Baguio Wong | (South Korea) Hwang Yool-ja (South Korea) Wie Sang-sook | |
| 1957 | Manila | (Taiwan) Chen Pao-pei (Taiwan) Chiang Tsai-yun | (Taiwan) Yao Chu (Taiwan) Yao Lee-Lien | |
| 1960 | Bombay | (Japan) Kazuko Ito-Yamaizumi (Japan) Kimiyo Matsuzaki | (South Korea) Choi Kyung-ja (South Korea) Hwang Yool-ja | |
| 1963 | Manila | (Japan) Kimiyo Matsuzaki (Japan) Masako Seki | | |
| 1964 | Seoul | (Japan) Naoko Fukatsu (Japan) Masako Seki | (Japan) Tsunao Isomura (Japan) Masako Ohta | |
| 1967 | Singapore | (Japan) Saeko Hirota (Japan) Sachiko Morisawa | (Japan) Nagata (Japan) Yukie Ozeki | |
| 1968 | Jakarta | (Japan) Mieko Fukuno (Japan) Yukie Ozeki | (Japan) Toshiko Kowada (Japan) Sachiko Morisawa | |
| 1970 | Nagoya | (Japan) Setsuko Kobori (Japan) Yukiko Onuma | (Japan) Mieko Fukuno (Japan) Mieko Hirano | (Japan) Harumi Ito (Japan) Tomoko Sakakibara |
| 1970 | Nagoya | (Japan) Setsuko Kobori (Japan) Yukiko Onuma | (Japan) Mieko Fukuno (Japan) Mieko Hirano | (South Korea) Lee Ailesa (South Korea) Ro Hwa-ja |

=== Mixed doubles ===
| Year | Host City | Gold | Silver | Bronze |
|---|---|---|---|---|
| 1952 | Singapore | (India) Kalyanpur Jayant (India) Gool Nasikwala | (Hong Kong) Suh Sui Cho (Hong Kong) Baguio Wong | (Singapore) Cha Kim Hearn (Singapore) M. Hayes |
| 1952 | Singapore | (India) Kalyanpur Jayant (India) Gool Nasikwala | (Hong Kong) Suh Sui Cho (Hong Kong) Baguio Wong | (Japan) Hiroji Satoh (Japan) Yoshiko Tanaka |
| 1953 | Tokyo | (Japan) Kichii Tamasu (Japan) Yoshiko Tanaka | (Japan) Tadaki Hayashi (Japan) Tomie Nishimura | |
| 1954 | Singapore | (South Korea) Rhee Kyong-ho (South Korea) Wie Sang-sook | (India) Yatin Vyas (India) Meena Parande | |
| 1957 | Manila | (Hong Kong) Suh Sui Cho (Hong Kong) Baguio Wong | | |
| 1960 | Bombay | (Japan) Ichiro Ogimura (Japan) Kimiyo Matsuzaki | (Japan) Teruo Murakami (Japan) Kazuko Ito-Yamaizumi | |
| 1963 | Manila | (Japan) Manji Fukushima (Japan) Kazuko Ito-Yamaizumi | | |
| 1964 | Seoul | (Japan) Ken Konaka (Japan) Naoko Fukatsu | (Japan) Koji Kimura (Japan) Masako Seki | |
| 1967 | Singapore | (Japan) Tetsuo Inoue (Japan) Mieko Hirano | (Japan) Nobuhiko Hasegawa (Japan) Nagata | |
| 1968 | Jakarta | (Japan) Shigeo Itoh (Japan) Mieko Fukuno | (Japan) Mitsuru Kono (Japan) Toshiko Kowada | |
| 1970 | Nagoya | (Japan) Nobuhiko Hasegawa (Japan) Toshiko Kowada | (Japan) Tokuyasu Nishii (Japan) Yoshiko Takase | |

=== Results of Team Events ===
The tables below are Asian Table Tennis Champions lists of teams events.

=== Men's team ===
| Year | Host City | Gold | Silver | Bronze |
|---|---|---|---|---|
| 1952 | Singapore | Hong Kong | Japan | (Portugal) Macau |
| 1953 | Tokyo | Japan | South Vietnam | (Taiwan) Republic of China |
| 1954 | Singapore | Hong Kong | Singapore | Philippines |
| 1957 | Manila | South Vietnam | India | (Taiwan) Republic of China |
| 1960 | Bombay | Japan | India | South Korea |
| 1963 | Manila | Japan | | |
| 1964 | Seoul | Japan | South Korea | (Taiwan) Republic of China |
| 1967 | Singapore | Japan | South Korea | |
| 1968 | Jakarta | Japan | Indonesia | Philippines |
| 1968 | Jakarta | Japan | Indonesia | South Korea |
| 1970 | Nagoya | Japan | South Korea | Malaysia |
| 1970 | Nagoya | Japan | South Korea | (Taiwan) Republic of China |

=== Women's team ===
| Year | Host City | Gold | Silver | Bronze |
|---|---|---|---|---|
| 1952 | Singapore | Hong Kong (Portugal) Macau | Not awarded, as there was a tie for gold. | Singapore |
| 1953 | Tokyo | Japan | (Taiwan) Republic of China | Hong Kong |
| 1954 | Singapore | Hong Kong | South Korea | Singapore |
| 1957 | Manila | (Taiwan) Republic of China | South Korea | Hong Kong |
| 1960 | Bombay | Japan | South Korea | India |
| 1963 | Manila | Japan | | |
| 1964 | Seoul | Japan | South Korea | (Taiwan) Republic of China |
| 1967 | Singapore | Japan | South Korea | |
| 1968 | Jakarta | South Korea | Japan | Malaysia |
| 1968 | Jakarta | South Korea | Japan | Thailand |
| 1970 | Nagoya | South Korea | Japan | Indonesia |
| 1970 | Nagoya | South Korea | Japan | (Taiwan) Republic of China |

== Results of ATTU Events ==
=== Winners of ATTU Asian Championships (1972 - Now) ===
| Year | Team | | Singles | | Doubles | | |
| Year | Men's | Women's | Men's | Women's | Men's | Women's | Mixed |
|---|---|---|---|---|---|---|---|
| 1972; Beijing，China | Japan | China | (Japan) Nobuhiko Hasegawa | (China) Li Li | (Japan) Tetsuo Inoue (Japan) Mitsuru Kohno | (North Korea) Kim Chang-Ae (North Korea) O Yong-Suk | (Japan) Nobuhiko Hasegawa (Japan) Yasuko Konno |
| 1974; Yokohama，Japan | China | Japan | (Japan) Nobuhiko Hasegawa | (Japan) Tomie Edano | (Japan) Nobuhiko Hasegawa (Japan) Mitsuru Kohno | (China) Zheng Huaiying (China) Zhang Li | (Japan) Mitsuru Kohno (Japan) Tomie Edano |
| 1976; Pyongyang，North Korea | China | North Korea | (China) Liang Geliang | (China) Zhang Li | (Japan) Tetsuo Inoue (Japan) Mitsuru Kohno | (North Korea) Kim Chang-Ae (North Korea) Pak Yung-Sun | (Japan) Tetsuo Inoue (Japan) Mitsuko Shimamoto |
| 1978; Kuala Lumpur，Malaysia | China | China | (China) Guo Yuehua | (China) Cao Yanhua | (North Korea) Cho Yong-ho (North Korea) Yun Chol | (North Korea) Kim Chang-Ae (North Korea) Pak Yong-Ok | (Japan) Seiji Ono (Japan) Kayo Sugaya |
| 1980; Calcutta，India | China | China | (China) Shi Zhihao | (China) Qi Baoxiang | (China) Guo Yuehua (China) Xie Saike | (China) Liu Yang (China) Zhang Deying | (China) Xie Saike (China) Zhang Deying |
| 1982; Jakarta，Indonesia | China | China | (China) Cai Zhenhua | (China) Cao Yanhua | (China) Guo Yuehua (China) Xie Saike | (China) Cao Yanhua (China) Huang Junqun | (China) Jiang Jialiang (China) Tong Ling |
| 1984; Islamabad，Pakistan | China | China | (China) Xie Saike | (China) He Zhili | (China) Teng Yi (China) Xie Saike | (China) Dai Lili (China) Geng Lijuan | (China) Xie Saike (China) Dai Lili |
| 1986; Shenzhen，China | China | China | (China) Jiang Jialiang | (China) He Zhili | (China) Hui Jun (China) Teng Yi | (China) Dai Lili (China) He Zhili | (China) Hui Jun (China) Geng Lijuan |
| 1988; Niigata，Japan | China | South Korea | (China) Chen Longcan | (China) He Zhili | (China) Chen Longcan (China) Wei Qingguang | (South Korea) Hyun Jung-Hwa (South Korea) Yang Young-Ja | (South Korea) Yoo Nam-Kyu (South Korea) Hyun Jung-Hwa |
| 1990; Kuala Lumpur，Malaysia | China | South Korea | (China) Wang Tao | (China) Qiao Hong | (North Korea) Kim Guk-Chol (North Korea) Kim Song-Hui | (China) Hu Xiaoxin (China) Qiao Hong | (South Korea) Yoo Nam-Kyu (South Korea) Hyun Jung-Hwa |
| 1992; New Delhi，India | China | Hong Kong | (China) Xie Chaojie | (China) Tang Weiyi | (South Korea) Kang Hee-Chan (South Korea) Lee Chul-Seung | (China) Tang Weiyi (China) Ying Ronghui | (China) Liu Guoliang (China) Wu Na |
| 1994; Tianjin，China | China | China | (China) Kong Linghui | (China) Deng Yaping | (China) Lin Zhigang (China) Liu Guoliang | (China) Liu Wei (China) Qiao Yunping | (China) Kong Linghui (China) Deng Yaping |
| 1996; Kallang，Singapore | South Korea | China | (China) Kong Linghui | (Japan) Chire Koyama | (China) Kong Linghui (China) Liu Guoliang | (China) Li Ju (China) Wang Nan | (China) Ma Lin (China) Wu Na |
| 1998; Osaka，Japan | China | China | (China) Wang Liqin | (China) Li Ju | (China) Liu Guoliang (China) Ma Lin | (South Korea) Lee Eun-Sil (South Korea) Ryu Ji-Hae | (China) Wang Liqin (China) Wang Nan |
| 2000; Doha，Qatar | China | China | (Chinese Taipei) Chiang Peng-lung | (China) Lin Ling | (Chinese Taipei) Chang Yen-shu (Chinese Taipei) Chiang Peng-lung | (South Korea) Lee Eun-Sil (South Korea) Seok Eun-Mi | (China) Yan Sen (China) Yang Ying |
| 2003; Bangkok，Thailand | China | China | (China) Wang Hao | (China) Niu Jianfeng | (Hong Kong) Ko Lai Chak (Hong Kong) Li Ching | (China) Guo Yan (China) Li Nan | (China) Liu Guozheng (China) Li Nan |
| 2005; Jejudo，South Korea | China | Hong Kong | (China) Wang Liqin | (Hong Kong) Lin Ling | (Hong Kong) Ko Lai Chak (Hong Kong) Li Ching | (China) Guo Yan (China) Liu Shiwen | (China) Wang Liqin (China) Guo Yue |
| 2007; Yangzhou，China | China | China | (China) Wang Hao | (China) Zhang Yining | (China) Hao Shuai (China) Ma Long | (China) Guo Yue (China) Li Xiaoxia | (South Korea) Oh Sang-Eun (South Korea) Kwak Bang-Bang |
| 2009; Lucknow，India | China | China | (China) Ma Long | (China) Ding Ning | (China) Ma Long (China) Xu Xin | (China) Ding Ning (China) Li Xiaoxia | (China) Ma Long (China) Li Xiaoxia |
| 2011 ^{[a]} Macau，China | China | China | (China) Ma Long | (China) Guo Yan | (Singapore) Gao Ning (Singapore) Yang Zi | (China) Ding Ning (China) Guo Yan | (China) Xu Xin (China) Guo Yan |
| 2013; Busan，South Korea | China | China | (China) Ma Long | (China) Liu Shiwen | (China) Yan An (China) Zhou Yu | (China) Chen Meng (China) Zhu Yuling | (South Korea) Lee Sang-Su (South Korea) Park Young-Sook |
| 2015; Pattaya，Thailand | China | China | (China) Fan Zhendong | (China) Zhu Yuling | (China) Fan Zhendong (China) Xu Xin | (North Korea) Kim Hye-song (North Korea) Ri Mi-Gyong | (China) Fan Zhendong (China) Chen Meng |
| 2017; Wuxi，China | China | China | (China) Fan Zhendong | (Japan) Miu Hirano | (China) Fan Zhendong (China) Lin Gaoyuan | (China) Zhu Yuling (China) Chen Meng | (China) Zhou Yu (China) Chen Xingtong |
| 2019; Yogyakarta，Indonesia | China | China | (China) Xu Xin | (China) Sun Yingsha | (China) Liang Jingkun (China) Lin Gaoyuan | (China) Ding Ning (China) Zhu Yuling | (China) Xu Xin (China) Liu Shiwen |
| 2021; Doha，Qatar | South Korea | Japan | (South Korea) Lee Sang-su | (Japan) Hina Hayata | (Japan) Shunsuke Togami (Japan) Yukiya Uda | (South Korea) Jeon Ji-hee (South Korea) Shin Yu-bin | (Japan) Shunsuke Togami (Japan) Hina Hayata |
| 2023; Pyeongchang，Korea | China | China | (China) Ma Long | (China) Wang Manyu | (China) Fan Zhendong (China) Lin Gaoyuan | (China) Chen Meng (China) Wang Manyu | (China) Lin Gaoyuan (China) Wang Yidi |
| 2024; Astana，Kazakhstan | China | Japan | (Japan) Tomokazu Harimoto | (North Korea) Kim Kum Yong | (South Korea) An Jae-hyun (South Korea) Lim Jong-hoon | (Japan) Satsuki Odo (Japan) Sakura Yokoi | (China) Lin Shidong (China) Kuai Man |
| 2025; Bhubaneswar，India | China | China | NA | NA | NA | NA | NA |
| 2026; Tashkent，Uzbekistan | China | Japan | (Japan) Tomokazu Harimoto | (China) Chen Yi | (China) Huang Youzheng (China) Lin Shidong | (China) Kuai Man (China) Wang Yidi | (Japan) Sora Matsushima (Japan) Miwa Harimoto |
a. The 20th ATTU Asian Championships was scheduled in Beirut, Lebanon. From September 12 to 18, 2011. Due to security deterioration in the region, the tournament is postponed. It was later announced to be held in Macau from February 23 to March 1, 2012.

=== Results of Individual Events ===
The tables below are Asian Table Tennis Champions lists of individual events (Men's and Women's Singles, Men's and Women's Doubles and Mixed).

=== Men's singles ===
| Year | Host City | Gold | Silver | Bronze |
|---|---|---|---|---|
| 1972 | Beijing | (Japan) Nobuhiko Hasegawa | (China) Xi Enting | (China) Liang Geliang |
| 1972 | Beijing | (Japan) Nobuhiko Hasegawa | (China) Xi Enting | (China) Wang Wenrong |
| 1974 | Yokohama | (Japan) Nobuhiko Hasegawa | (China) Xi Enting | (Japan) Mitsuru Kono |
| 1974 | Yokohama | (Japan) Nobuhiko Hasegawa | (China) Xi Enting | (China) Li Zhenshi |
| 1976 | Pyongyang | (China) Liang Geliang | (China) Guo Yuehua | (China) Li Peng |
| 1976 | Pyongyang | (China) Liang Geliang | (China) Guo Yuehua | (Japan) Norio Takashima |
| 1978 | Kuala Lumpur | (China) Guo Yuehua | (China) Liang Geliang | (China) Chen Xinhua |
| 1978 | Kuala Lumpur | (China) Guo Yuehua | (China) Liang Geliang | (North Korea) Cho Yong-ho |
| 1980 | Calcutta | (China) Shi Zhihao | (China) Xie Saike | (China) Guo Yuehua |
| 1980 | Calcutta | (China) Shi Zhihao | (China) Xie Saike | (China) Huang Liang |
| 1982 | Jakarta | (China) Cai Zhenhua | (China) Xie Saike | (China) Guo Yuehua |
| 1982 | Jakarta | (China) Cai Zhenhua | (China) Xie Saike | (Japan) Kiyoshi Saito |
| 1984 | Islamabad | (China) Xie Saike | (China) Chen Longcan | (North Korea) Ri Gun-sang |
| 1984 | Islamabad | (China) Xie Saike | (China) Chen Longcan | (China) Wang Huiyuan |
| 1986 | Shenzhen | (China) Jiang Jialiang | (China) Teng Yi | (China) Chen Longcan |
| 1986 | Shenzhen | (China) Jiang Jialiang | (China) Teng Yi | (China) Wang Hao |
| 1988 | Niigata | (China) Chen Longcan | (South Korea) Yoo Nam-kyu | (China) Jiang Jialiang |
| 1988 | Niigata | (China) Chen Longcan | (South Korea) Yoo Nam-kyu | (China) Wei Qingguang |
| 1990 | Kuala Lumpur | (China) Wang Tao | (China) Ma Wenge | (South Korea) Kim Taek-soo |
| 1990 | Kuala Lumpur | (China) Wang Tao | (China) Ma Wenge | (China) Xie Chaojie |
| 1992 | New Delhi | (China) Xie Chaojie | (South Korea) Kang Hee-chan | (North Korea) Kim Guk-chol |
| 1992 | New Delhi | (China) Xie Chaojie | (South Korea) Kang Hee-chan | (North Korea) Li Sung |
| 1994 | Tianjin | (China) Kong Linghui | (China) Liu Guoliang | (China) Lin Zhigang |
| 1994 | Tianjin | (China) Kong Linghui | (China) Liu Guoliang | (China) Lü Lin |
| 1996 | Kallang | (China) Kong Linghui | (China) Liu Guoliang | (South Korea) Kim Taek-soo |
| 1996 | Kallang | (China) Kong Linghui | (China) Liu Guoliang | (China) Ma Lin |
| 1998 | Osaka | (China) Wang Liqin | (Japan) Iseki Seiko | (China) Liu Guoliang |
| 1998 | Osaka | (China) Wang Liqin | (Japan) Iseki Seiko | (China) Yan Sen |
| 2000 | Doha | (Chinese Taipei) Chiang Peng-lung | (South Korea) Kim Taek-soo | (China) Ma Lin |
| 2000 | Doha | (Chinese Taipei) Chiang Peng-lung | (South Korea) Kim Taek-soo | (China) Wang Liqin |
| 2003 | Bangkok | (China) Wang Hao | (China) Tang Peng | (Hong Kong) Ko Lai Chak |
| 2003 | Bangkok | (China) Wang Hao | (China) Tang Peng | (South Korea) Ryu Seung-min |
| 2005 | Jeju-do | (China) Wang Liqin | (Hong Kong) Li Ching | (South Korea) Choi Hyun-jin |
| 2005 | Jeju-do | (China) Wang Liqin | (Hong Kong) Li Ching | (China) Hao Shuai |
| 2007 | Yangzhou | (China) Wang Hao | (China) Ma Long | (Hong Kong) Ko Lai Chak |
| 2007 | Yangzhou | (China) Wang Hao | (China) Ma Long | (South Korea) Oh Sang-eun |
| 2009 | Lucknow | (China) Ma Long | (China) Zhang Jike | (China) Wang Liqin |
| 2009 | Lucknow | (China) Ma Long | (China) Zhang Jike | (China) Xu Xin |
| 2011 | Macau | (China) Ma Long | (China) Zhang Jike | (China) Wang Hao |
| 2011 | Macau | (China) Ma Long | (China) Zhang Jike | (China) Xu Xin |
| 2013 | Busan | (China) Ma Long | (China) Yan An | (Japan) Kenta Matsudaira |
| 2013 | Busan | (China) Ma Long | (China) Yan An | (China) Xu Xin |
| 2015 | Pattaya | (China) Fan Zhendong | (China) Xu Xin | (Chinese Taipei) Chuang Chih-yuan |
| 2015 | Pattaya | (China) Fan Zhendong | (China) Xu Xin | (Hong Kong) Wong Chun-ting |
| 2017 | Wuxi | (China) Fan Zhendong | (South Korea) Jeong Sang-eun | (Japan) Koki Niwa |
| 2017 | Wuxi | (China) Fan Zhendong | (South Korea) Jeong Sang-eun | (China) Zhang Jike |
| 2019 | Yogyakarta | (China) Xu Xin | (China) Lin Gaoyuan | (China) Fan Zhendong |
| 2019 | Yogyakarta | (China) Xu Xin | (China) Lin Gaoyuan | (Japan) Tomokazu Harimoto |
| 2021 | Doha | (South Korea) Lee Sang-su | (Chinese Taipei) Chuang Chih-yuan | (South Korea) Jang Woo-jin |
| 2021 | Doha | (South Korea) Lee Sang-su | (Chinese Taipei) Chuang Chih-yuan | (Japan) Shunsuke Togami |
| 2023 | Pyeongchang | (China) Ma Long | (China) Fan Zhendong | (China) Liang Jingkun |
| 2023 | Pyeongchang | (China) Ma Long | (China) Fan Zhendong | (Chinese Taipei) Lin Yun-ju |
| 2024 | Astana | (Japan) Tomokazu Harimoto | (China) Lin Shidong | (South Korea) Oh Jun-sung |
| 2024 | Astana | (Japan) Tomokazu Harimoto | (China) Lin Shidong | (Japan) Hiroto Shinozuka |
| 2026 | Tashkent | (Japan) Tomokazu Harimoto | (China) Li Tianyang | (Chinese Taipei) Kuo Guan-Hong |
| 2026 | Tashkent | (Japan) Tomokazu Harimoto | (China) Li Tianyang | (China) Wen Ruibo |

=== Women's singles ===
| Year | Host City | Gold | Silver | Bronze |
|---|---|---|---|---|
| 1972 | Beijing | (China) Li Li | (Japan) Yukie Ozeki | (North Korea) Cha Kyung-mi |
| 1972 | Beijing | (China) Li Li | (Japan) Yukie Ozeki | (China) Qiu Baoqin |
| 1974 | Yokohama | (Japan) Tomie Edano | (Japan) Yukie Ozeki | (Japan) Tazuko Abe |
| 1974 | Yokohama | (Japan) Tomie Edano | (Japan) Yukie Ozeki | (Japan) Sachiko Yokota |
| 1976 | Pyongyang | (China) Zhang Li | (China) Zhang Deying | (China) Ge Xin'ai |
| 1976 | Pyongyang | (China) Zhang Li | (China) Zhang Deying | (North Korea) Pak Yung-sun |
| 1978 | Kuala Lumpur | (China) Cao Yanhua | (China) Yang Ying | (China) Zhang Deying |
| 1978 | Kuala Lumpur | (China) Cao Yanhua | (China) Yang Ying | (China) Zhang Li |
| 1980 | Calcutta | (China) Qi Baoxiang | (China) Liu Yang | (Hong Kong) Hui So Hung |
| 1980 | Calcutta | (China) Qi Baoxiang | (China) Liu Yang | (China) Tong Ling |
| 1982 | Jakarta | (China) Cao Yanhua | (China) Tong Ling | (China) Huang Junqun |
| 1982 | Jakarta | (China) Cao Yanhua | (China) Tong Ling | (North Korea) Kim Gyong-sun |
| 1984 | Islamabad | (China) He Zhili | (China) Dai Lili | (China) Geng Lijuan |
| 1984 | Islamabad | (China) He Zhili | (China) Dai Lili | (China) Jiao Zhimin |
| 1986 | Shenzhen | (China) He Zhili | (China) Jiao Zhimin | (China) Dai Lili |
| 1986 | Shenzhen | (China) He Zhili | (China) Jiao Zhimin | (China) Geng Lijuan |
| 1988 | Niigata | (China) He Zhili | (China) Jiao Zhimin | (South Korea) Hyun Jung-hwa |
| 1988 | Niigata | (China) He Zhili | (China) Jiao Zhimin | (China) Li Huifen |
| 1990 | Kuala Lumpur | (China) Qiao Hong | (China) Liu Wei | (South Korea) Hong Soon-hwa |
| 1990 | Kuala Lumpur | (China) Qiao Hong | (China) Liu Wei | (North Korea) Li Bun-hui |
| 1992 | New Delhi | (China) Tang Weiyi | (China) Wu Na | (China) Wang Chen |
| 1992 | New Delhi | (China) Tang Weiyi | (China) Wu Na | (China) Ying Ronghui |
| 1994 | Tianjin | (China) Deng Yaping | (China) Qiao Hong | (China) Liu Wei |
| 1994 | Tianjin | (China) Deng Yaping | (China) Qiao Hong | (China) Qiao Yunping |
| 1996 | Kallang | (Japan) Chire Koyama | (China) Wang Chen | (Hong Kong) Chan Tan Lui |
| 1996 | Kallang | (Japan) Chire Koyama | (China) Wang Chen | (China) Wu Na |
| 1998 | Osaka | (China) Li Ju | (China) Wang Nan | (Chinese Taipei) Chen Jing |
| 1998 | Osaka | (China) Li Ju | (China) Wang Nan | (Japan) Chire Koyama |
| 2000 | Doha | (China) Lin Ling | (China) Li Nan | (South Korea) Kim Moo-kyo |
| 2000 | Doha | (China) Lin Ling | (China) Li Nan | (South Korea) Seok Eun-mi |
| 2003 | Bangkok | (China) Niu Jianfeng | (China) Li Nan | (China) Guo Yue |
| 2003 | Bangkok | (China) Niu Jianfeng | (China) Li Nan | (Hong Kong) Tie Ya Na |
| 2005 | Jeju-do | (Hong Kong) Lin Ling | (Hong Kong) Lau Sui-fei | (Singapore) Li Jiawei |
| 2005 | Jeju-do | (Hong Kong) Lin Ling | (Hong Kong) Lau Sui-fei | (China) Niu Jianfeng |
| 2007 | Yangzhou | (China) Zhang Yining | (China) Li Xiaoxia | (China) Guo Yan |
| 2007 | Yangzhou | (China) Zhang Yining | (China) Li Xiaoxia | (China) Wang Nan |
| 2009 | Lucknow | (China) Ding Ning | (China) Li Xiaoxia | (China) Fan Ying |
| 2009 | Lucknow | (China) Ding Ning | (China) Li Xiaoxia | (China) Liu Shiwen |
| 2011 | Macau | (China) Guo Yan | (China) Li Xiaoxia | (China) Ding Ning |
| 2011 | Macau | (China) Guo Yan | (China) Li Xiaoxia | (China) Liu Shiwen |
| 2013 | Busan | (China) Liu Shiwen | (China) Ding Ning | (China) Chen Meng |
| 2013 | Busan | (China) Liu Shiwen | (China) Ding Ning | (China) Zhu Yuling |
| 2015 | Pattaya | (China) Zhu Yuling | (China) Chen Meng | (Singapore) Feng Tianwei |
| 2015 | Pattaya | (China) Zhu Yuling | (China) Chen Meng | (China) Mu Zi |
| 2017 | Wuxi | (Japan) Miu Hirano | (China) Chen Meng | (China) Liu Shiwen |
| 2017 | Wuxi | (Japan) Miu Hirano | (China) Chen Meng | (China) Zhu Yuling |
| 2019 | Yogyakarta | (China) Sun Yingsha | (China) Liu Shiwen | (China) Chen Meng |
| 2019 | Yogyakarta | (China) Sun Yingsha | (China) Liu Shiwen | (China) Ding Ning |
| 2021 | Doha | (Japan) Hina Hayata | (South Korea) Shin Yu-bin | (Japan) Minami Ando |
| 2021 | Doha | (Japan) Hina Hayata | (South Korea) Shin Yu-bin | (Japan) Saki Shibata |
| 2023 | Pyeongchang | (China) Wang Manyu | (China) Sun Yingsha | (China) Chen Xingtong |
| 2023 | Pyeongchang | (China) Wang Manyu | (China) Sun Yingsha | (China) Wang Yidi |
| 2024 | Astana | (North Korea) Kim Kum Yong | (Japan) Miwa Harimoto | (Hong Kong) Doo Hoi Kem |
| 2024 | Astana | (North Korea) Kim Kum Yong | (Japan) Miwa Harimoto | (Japan) Mima Ito |
| 2026 | Tashkent | (China) Chen Yi | (Japan) Miwa Harimoto | (China) Kuai Man |
| 2026 | Tashkent | (China) Chen Yi | (Japan) Miwa Harimoto | (China) Wang Yidi |

=== Men's doubles ===
| Year | Host City | Gold | Silver | Bronze |
|---|---|---|---|---|
| 1972 | Beijing | (Japan) Tetsuo Inoue (Japan) Mitsuru Kono | (Japan) Nobuhiko Hasegawa (Japan) Tokio Tasaka | (North Korea) Kim Chang-ho (North Korea) Pak Sin-il |
| 1972 | Beijing | (Japan) Tetsuo Inoue (Japan) Mitsuru Kono | (Japan) Nobuhiko Hasegawa (Japan) Tokio Tasaka | (China) Liang Geliang (China) Xi Enting |
| 1974 | Yokohama | (Japan) Nobuhiko Hasegawa (Japan) Mitsuru Kono | (China) Diao Wenyuan (China) Li Zhenshi | (Japan) Yujiro Imano (Japan) Tokio Tasaka |
| 1974 | Yokohama | (Japan) Nobuhiko Hasegawa (Japan) Mitsuru Kono | (China) Diao Wenyuan (China) Li Zhenshi | (China) Xi Enting (China) Xu Shaofa |
| 1976 | Pyongyang | (Japan) Tetsuo Inoue (Japan) Mitsuru Kono | (China) Li Zhenshi (China) Liang Geliang | (North Korea) Cho Yong-ho (North Korea) Yun Chol |
| 1976 | Pyongyang | (Japan) Tetsuo Inoue (Japan) Mitsuru Kono | (China) Li Zhenshi (China) Liang Geliang | (India) Manjit Singh Dua (India) Vilas Menon |
| 1978 | Kuala Lumpur | (North Korea) Cho Yong-ho (North Korea) Yun Chol | (China) Guo Yuehua (China) Lu Yaohua | (China) Huang Dongsheng (China) Liang Geliang |
| 1978 | Kuala Lumpur | (North Korea) Cho Yong-ho (North Korea) Yun Chol | (China) Guo Yuehua (China) Lu Yaohua | (Japan) Seiji Ono (Japan) Masanori Uchida |
| 1980 | Calcutta | (China) Guo Yuehua (China) Xie Saike | (China) Cai Zhenhua (China) Shi Zhihao | (Japan) Kaku Chida (Japan) Hideo Gotoh |
| 1980 | Calcutta | (China) Guo Yuehua (China) Xie Saike | (China) Cai Zhenhua (China) Shi Zhihao | (Japan) Shigero Fukue (Japan) Satsuki Horime |
| 1982 | Jakarta | (China) Guo Yuehua (China) Xie Saike | (China) Cai Zhenhua (China) Jiang Jialiang | (Japan) Hiroyuki Abe (Japan) Masahiro Maehara |
| 1982 | Jakarta | (China) Guo Yuehua (China) Xie Saike | (China) Cai Zhenhua (China) Jiang Jialiang | (Hong Kong) Chiu Man Kuen (Hong Kong) Vong Iu Veng |
| 1984 | Islamabad | (China) Teng Yi (China) Xie Saike | (China) Chen Longcan (China) Wang Huiyuan | (North Korea) Cho Yong-ho (North Korea) Hong Chol |
| 1984 | Islamabad | (China) Teng Yi (China) Xie Saike | (China) Chen Longcan (China) Wang Huiyuan | (South Korea) Kim Ki-taik (South Korea) Kim Wan |
| 1986 | Shenzhen | (China) Hui Jun (China) Teng Yi | (China) Chen Longcan (China) Wei Qingguang | (China) Jiang Jialiang (China) Sun Jianwei |
| 1986 | Shenzhen | (China) Hui Jun (China) Teng Yi | (China) Chen Longcan (China) Wei Qingguang | (Japan) Yuji Matsushita (Japan) Seiji Ono |
| 1988 | Niigata | (China) Chen Longcan (China) Wei Qingguang | (Chinese Taipei) Chih Chin-long (Chinese Taipei) Chih Chin-shui | (South Korea) Ahn Jae-hyung (South Korea) Yoo Nam-kyu |
| 1988 | Niigata | (China) Chen Longcan (China) Wei Qingguang | (Chinese Taipei) Chih Chin-long (Chinese Taipei) Chih Chin-shui | (South Korea) Kim Ki-taik (South Korea) Kim Wan |
| 1990 | Kuala Lumpur | (North Korea) Kim Guk-chol (North Korea) Kim Song-hui | (Chinese Taipei) Feng Sheng-chin (Chinese Taipei) Wu Wen-chia | (China) Lü Lin (China) Wang Tao |
| 1990 | Kuala Lumpur | (North Korea) Kim Guk-chol (North Korea) Kim Song-hui | (Chinese Taipei) Feng Sheng-chin (Chinese Taipei) Wu Wen-chia | (Japan) Yoji Morimoto (Japan) Hiroshi Shibutani |
| 1992 | New Delhi | (South Korea) Kang Hee-chan (South Korea) Lee Chul-seung | (North Korea) Li Sung-il (North Korea) Ri Gun-sang | (China) Li Yi (China) Liu Guoliang |
| 1992 | New Delhi | (South Korea) Kang Hee-chan (South Korea) Lee Chul-seung | (North Korea) Li Sung-il (North Korea) Ri Gun-sang | (China) Wang Yonggang (China) Xie Chaojie |
| 1994 | Tianjin | (China) Lin Zhigang (China) Liu Guoliang | (China) Lü Lin (China) Wang Tao | (Chinese Taipei) Chiang Peng-lung (Chinese Taipei) Wu Wen-chia |
| 1994 | Tianjin | (China) Lin Zhigang (China) Liu Guoliang | (China) Lü Lin (China) Wang Tao | (South Korea) Kim Bong-chul (South Korea) Oh Sang-eun |
| 1996 | Kallang | (China) Kong Linghui (China) Liu Guoliang | (South Korea) Kang Hee-chan (South Korea) Kim Taek-soo | (Japan) Kōji Matsushita (Japan) Yoji Morimoto |
| 1996 | Kallang | (China) Kong Linghui (China) Liu Guoliang | (South Korea) Kang Hee-chan (South Korea) Kim Taek-soo | (Japan) Kinjiro Nakamura (Japan) Akira Takashi |
| 1998 | Osaka | (China) Liu Guoliang (China) Ma Lin | (South Korea) Oh Sang-eun (South Korea) Yoo Nam-kyu | (South Korea) Kim Taek-soo (South Korea) Lee Chul-seung |
| 1998 | Osaka | (China) Liu Guoliang (China) Ma Lin | (South Korea) Oh Sang-eun (South Korea) Yoo Nam-kyu | (China) Wang Liqin (China) Yan Sen |
| 2000 | Doha | (Chinese Taipei) Chang Yen-shu (Chinese Taipei) Chiang Peng-lung | (Hong Kong) Cheung Yuk (Hong Kong) Leung Chu Yan | (Japan) Shinnosuke Kiho (Japan) Iseki Seiko |
| 2000 | Doha | (Chinese Taipei) Chang Yen-shu (Chinese Taipei) Chiang Peng-lung | (Hong Kong) Cheung Yuk (Hong Kong) Leung Chu Yan | (China) Wang Liqin (China) Yan Sen |
| 2003 | Bangkok | (Hong Kong) Ko Lai Chak (Hong Kong) Li Ching | (Hong Kong) Cheung Yuk (Hong Kong) Leung Chu Yan | (China) Liu Guozheng (China) Wang Hao |
| 2003 | Bangkok | (Hong Kong) Ko Lai Chak (Hong Kong) Li Ching | (Hong Kong) Cheung Yuk (Hong Kong) Leung Chu Yan | (China) Tang Peng (China) Wang Jianjun |
| 2005 | Jeju-do | (Hong Kong) Ko Lai Chak (Hong Kong) Li Ching | (China) Chen Qi (China) Wang Liqin | (South Korea) Choi Hyun-jin (South Korea) Ryu Seung-min |
| 2005 | Jeju-do | (Hong Kong) Ko Lai Chak (Hong Kong) Li Ching | (China) Chen Qi (China) Wang Liqin | (South Korea) Lee Jung-woo (South Korea) Oh Sang-eun |
| 2007 | Yangzhou | (China) Hao Shuai (China) Ma Long | (China) Chen Qi (China) Wang Hao | (Chinese Taipei) Chuang Chih-yuan (Chinese Taipei) Wu Chih-chi |
| 2007 | Yangzhou | (China) Hao Shuai (China) Ma Long | (China) Chen Qi (China) Wang Hao | (Japan) Seiya Kishikawa (Japan) Jun Mizutani |
| 2009 | Lucknow | (China) Ma Long (China) Xu Xin | (China) Wang Liqin (China) Zhang Jike | (Hong Kong) Cheung Yuk (Hong Kong) Li Ching |
| 2009 | Lucknow | (China) Ma Long (China) Xu Xin | (China) Wang Liqin (China) Zhang Jike | (Japan) Kenta Matsudaira (Japan) Koki Niwa |
| 2011 | Macau | (Singapore) Gao Ning (Singapore) Yang Zi | (South Korea) Jung Young-sik (South Korea) Kim Min-seok | (Hong Kong) Cheung Yuk (Hong Kong) Leung Chu Yan |
| 2011 | Macau | (Singapore) Gao Ning (Singapore) Yang Zi | (South Korea) Jung Young-sik (South Korea) Kim Min-seok | (China) Ma Long (China) Wang Hao |
| 2013 | Busan | (China) Yan An (China) Zhou Yu | (China) Ma Long (China) Xu Xin | (Singapore) Gao Ning (Singapore) Yang Zi |
| 2013 | Busan | (China) Yan An (China) Zhou Yu | (China) Ma Long (China) Xu Xin | (Japan) Kenta Matsudaira (Japan) Koki Niwa |
| 2015 | Pattaya | (China) Fan Zhendong (China) Xu Xin | (South Korea) Jung Young-sik (South Korea) Lee Sang-su | (Japan) Masataka Morizono (Japan) Yuya Oshima |
| 2015 | Pattaya | (China) Fan Zhendong (China) Xu Xin | (South Korea) Jung Young-sik (South Korea) Lee Sang-su | (Japan) Koki Niwa (Japan) Maharu Yoshimura |
| 2017 | Wuxi | (China) Fan Zhendong (China) Lin Gaoyuan | (China) Fang Bo (China) Zhou Yu | (Hong Kong) Ho Kwan-kit (Hong Kong) Wong Chun-ting |
| 2017 | Wuxi | (China) Fan Zhendong (China) Lin Gaoyuan | (China) Fang Bo (China) Zhou Yu | (Japan) Koki Niwa (Japan) Maharu Yoshimura |
| 2019 | Yogyakarta | (China) Liang Jingkun (China) Lin Gaoyuan | (China) Fan Zhendong (China) Xu Xin | (Hong Kong) Lam Siu-hang (Hong Kong) Ng Pak Nam |
| 2019 | Yogyakarta | (China) Liang Jingkun (China) Lin Gaoyuan | (China) Fan Zhendong (China) Xu Xin | (Japan) Shunsuke Togami (Japan) Maharu Yoshimura |
| 2021 | Doha | (Japan) Shunsuke Togami (Japan) Yukiya Uda | (South Korea) Jang Woo-jin (South Korea) Lim Jong-hoon | (India) Harmeet Desai (India) Manav Thakkar |
| 2021 | Doha | (Japan) Shunsuke Togami (Japan) Yukiya Uda | (South Korea) Jang Woo-jin (South Korea) Lim Jong-hoon | (India) Sathiyan Gnanasekaran (India) Sharath Kamal |
| 2023 | Pyeongchang | (China) Fan Zhendong (China) Lin Gaoyuan | (China) Ma Long (China) Wang Chuqin | (South Korea) An Jae-hyun (South Korea) Park Gang-hyeon |
| 2023 | Pyeongchang | (China) Fan Zhendong (China) Lin Gaoyuan | (China) Ma Long (China) Wang Chuqin | (South Korea) Jang Woo-jin (South Korea) Lim Jong-hoon |
| 2024 | Astana | (South Korea) An Jae-hyun (South Korea) Lim Jong-hoon | (Singapore) Koen Pang (Singapore) Izaac Quek | (Malaysia) Choong Javen (Malaysia) Wong Qi Shen |
| 2024 | Astana | (South Korea) An Jae-hyun (South Korea) Lim Jong-hoon | (Singapore) Koen Pang (Singapore) Izaac Quek | (Japan) Hiroto Shinozuka (Japan) Shunsuke Togami |
| 2026 | Tashkent | (China) Huang Youzheng (China) Lin Shidong | (China) Wen Ruibo (China) Yuan Licen | (Hong Kong) Chan Baldwin (Hong Kong) Wong Chun-ting |
| 2026 | Tashkent | (China) Huang Youzheng (China) Lin Shidong | (China) Wen Ruibo (China) Yuan Licen | (Singapore) Koen Pang (Singapore) Izaac Quek |

=== Women's doubles ===
| Year | Host City | Gold | Silver | Bronze |
|---|---|---|---|---|
| 1972 | Beijing | (North Korea) Kim Chang-ae (North Korea) O Yong-suk | (North Korea) Cha Kyung-mi (North Korea) Pak Yong-ok | (North Vietnam) Do Thuy Nga (North Vietnam) Nguyen Thi Mai |
| 1972 | Beijing | (North Korea) Kim Chang-ae (North Korea) O Yong-suk | (North Korea) Cha Kyung-mi (North Korea) Pak Yong-ok | (China) Hu Yulan (China) Qiu Baoqin |
| 1974 | Yokohama | (China) Zhang Li (China) Zheng Huaiying | (Japan) Yukie Ozeki (Japan) Sachiko Yokota | (Japan) Tazuko Abe (Japan) Tomie Edano |
| 1974 | Yokohama | (China) Zhang Li (China) Zheng Huaiying | (Japan) Yukie Ozeki (Japan) Sachiko Yokota | (North Korea) Cha Kyung-mi (North Korea) Kim Chang-ae |
| 1976 | Pyongyang | (North Korea) Kim Chang-ae (North Korea) Pak Yung-sun | (China) Zhang Deying (China) Zhang Li | (Japan) Tomie Edano (Japan) Teruko Kuroko |
| 1976 | Pyongyang | (North Korea) Kim Chang-ae (North Korea) Pak Yung-sun | (China) Zhang Deying (China) Zhang Li | (Japan) Mitsuko Shimamoto (Japan) Sachiko Yokota |
| 1978 | Kuala Lumpur | (North Korea) Kim Chang-ae (North Korea) Pak Yong-ok | (North Korea) Cho Jong-hui (North Korea) Ri Song-suk | (China) Cao Yanhua (China) Yang Ying |
| 1978 | Kuala Lumpur | (North Korea) Kim Chang-ae (North Korea) Pak Yong-ok | (North Korea) Cho Jong-hui (North Korea) Ri Song-suk | (China) Zhang Deying (China) Zhang Li |
| 1980 | Calcutta | (China) Liu Yang (China) Zhang Deying | (North Korea) Hong Gil-soon (North Korea) Pak Yong-ok | (China) Qi Baoxiang (China) Tong Ling |
| 1980 | Calcutta | (China) Liu Yang (China) Zhang Deying | (North Korea) Hong Gil-soon (North Korea) Pak Yong-ok | (Japan) Mana Shigetake (Japan) Rie Wada |
| 1982 | Jakarta | (China) Cao Yanhua (China) Huang Junqun | (China) Li Chunli (China) Tong Ling | (North Korea) Kim Gyong-sun (North Korea) Pang Chun-dok |
| 1982 | Jakarta | (China) Cao Yanhua (China) Huang Junqun | (China) Li Chunli (China) Tong Ling | (Japan) Yoshiko Shimauchi (Japan) Keiko Yamashita |
| 1984 | Islamabad | (China) Dai Lili (China) Geng Lijuan | (South Korea) Yang Young-ja (South Korea) Yoon Kyung-mi | (North Korea) Cho Jong-hui (North Korea) Li Bun-hui |
| 1984 | Islamabad | (China) Dai Lili (China) Geng Lijuan | (South Korea) Yang Young-ja (South Korea) Yoon Kyung-mi | (Japan) Mika Hoshino (Japan) Yoshiko Shimauchi |
| 1986 | Shenzhen | (China) Dai Lili (China) He Zhili | (North Korea) Cho Jong-hui (North Korea) Li Bun-hui | (China) Chen Jing (China) Li Huifen |
| 1986 | Shenzhen | (China) Dai Lili (China) He Zhili | (North Korea) Cho Jong-hui (North Korea) Li Bun-hui | (China) Geng Lijuan (China) Jiao Zhimin |
| 1988 | Niigata | (South Korea) Hyun Jung-hwa (South Korea) Yang Young-ja | (Chinese Taipei) Chang Hsiu-yu (Chinese Taipei) Huang Mei-jen | (China) He Zhili (China) Li Huifen |
| 1988 | Niigata | (South Korea) Hyun Jung-hwa (South Korea) Yang Young-ja | (Chinese Taipei) Chang Hsiu-yu (Chinese Taipei) Huang Mei-jen | (Japan) Katsuko Tominaga (Japan) Kyoko Uchiyama |
| 1990 | Kuala Lumpur | (China) Hu Xiaoxin (China) Qiao Hong | (China) Jing Junhong (China) Liu Wei | (South Korea) Hong Cha-ok (South Korea) Hyun Jung-hwa |
| 1990 | Kuala Lumpur | (China) Hu Xiaoxin (China) Qiao Hong | (China) Jing Junhong (China) Liu Wei | (South Korea) Hong Soon-hwa (South Korea) Lee Tae-joo |
| 1992 | New Delhi | (China) Tang Weiyi (China) Ying Ronghui | (Singapore) Gao Dong Ping (Singapore) Jing Junhong | (North Korea) Kim Hyon-ae (North Korea) Wi Bok-sun |
| 1992 | New Delhi | (China) Tang Weiyi (China) Ying Ronghui | (Singapore) Gao Dong Ping (Singapore) Jing Junhong | (North Korea) Li Mi-suk (North Korea) Yu Sun-bok |
| 1994 | Tianjin | (China) Liu Wei (China) Qiao Yunping | (China) Deng Yaping (China) Qiao Hong | (Hong Kong) Chai Po Wa (Hong Kong) Chan Tan Lui |
| 1994 | Tianjin | (China) Liu Wei (China) Qiao Yunping | (China) Deng Yaping (China) Qiao Hong | (Chinese Taipei) Chen Chiu-tan (Chinese Taipei) Tsui Hsiu-li |
| 1996 | Kallang | (China) Li Ju (China) Wang Nan | (China) Wang Chen (China) Wu Na | (Hong Kong) Chai Po Wa (Hong Kong) Chan Tan Lui |
| 1996 | Kallang | (China) Li Ju (China) Wang Nan | (China) Wang Chen (China) Wu Na | (Chinese Taipei) Tsui Hsiu-li (Chinese Taipei) Yu Feng-yin |
| 1998 | Osaka | (South Korea) Lee Eun-sil (South Korea) Ryu Ji-hye | (South Korea) Kim Moo-kyo (South Korea) Park Hae-jung | (Japan) Mayu Kishi-Kawagoe (Japan) Akiko Takeda |
| 1998 | Osaka | (South Korea) Lee Eun-sil (South Korea) Ryu Ji-hye | (South Korea) Kim Moo-kyo (South Korea) Park Hae-jung | (China) Wang Hui (Hong Kong) Wong Ching |
| 2000 | Doha | (South Korea) Lee Eun-sil (South Korea) Seok Eun-mi | (South Korea) Kim Moo-kyo (South Korea) Ryu Ji-hye | (Hong Kong) Kwok Fong Fong (Hong Kong) Song Ah Sim |
| 2000 | Doha | (South Korea) Lee Eun-sil (South Korea) Seok Eun-mi | (South Korea) Kim Moo-kyo (South Korea) Ryu Ji-hye | (China) Sun Jin (China) Yang Ying |
| 2003 | Bangkok | (China) Guo Yan (China) Li Nan | (Japan) Ai Fukuhara (Japan) An Konishi | (South Korea) Kim Kyung-ha (South Korea) Lee Eun-sil |
| 2003 | Bangkok | (China) Guo Yan (China) Li Nan | (Japan) Ai Fukuhara (Japan) An Konishi | (Hong Kong) Song Ah Sim (Hong Kong) Tie Ya Na |
| 2005 | Jeju-do | (China) Guo Yan (China) Liu Shiwen | (China) Guo Yue (China) Niu Jianfeng | (Japan) Ai Fujinuma (Japan) Ai Fukuhara |
| 2005 | Jeju-do | (China) Guo Yan (China) Liu Shiwen | (China) Guo Yue (China) Niu Jianfeng | (Hong Kong) Tie Ya Na (Hong Kong) Zhang Rui |
| 2007 | Yangzhou | (China) Guo Yue (China) Li Xiaoxia | (China) Wang Nan (China) Zhang Yining | (Singapore) Sun Beibei (Singapore) Yu Mengyu |
| 2007 | Yangzhou | (China) Guo Yue (China) Li Xiaoxia | (China) Wang Nan (China) Zhang Yining | (Hong Kong) Tie Ya Na (Hong Kong) Zhang Rui |
| 2009 | Lucknow | (China) Ding Ning (China) Li Xiaoxia | (South Korea) Kim Kyung-ah (South Korea) Park Mi-young | (South Korea) Dang Ye-seo (South Korea) Park Young-sook |
| 2009 | Lucknow | (China) Ding Ning (China) Li Xiaoxia | (South Korea) Kim Kyung-ah (South Korea) Park Mi-young | (Singapore) Feng Tianwei (Singapore) Yu Mengyu |
| 2011 | Macau | (China) Ding Ning (China) Guo Yan | (Singapore) Li Jiawei (Singapore) Sun Beibei | (Hong Kong) Jiang Huajun (Hong Kong) Ng Wing Nam |
| 2011 | Macau | (China) Ding Ning (China) Guo Yan | (Singapore) Li Jiawei (Singapore) Sun Beibei | (South Korea) Lee Eun-hee (South Korea) Park Young-sook |
| 2013 | Busan | (China) Chen Meng (China) Zhu Yuling | (China) Ding Ning (China) Liu Shiwen | (Hong Kong) Doo Hoi Kem (Hong Kong) Li Ching Wan |
| 2013 | Busan | (China) Chen Meng (China) Zhu Yuling | (China) Ding Ning (China) Liu Shiwen | (South Korea) Park Young-sook (South Korea) Yang Ha-eun |
| 2015 | Pattaya | (North Korea) Kim Hye-song (North Korea) Ri Mi-gyong | (Japan) Miu Hirano (Japan) Mima Ito | (China) Chen Meng (China) Zhu Yuling |
| 2015 | Pattaya | (North Korea) Kim Hye-song (North Korea) Ri Mi-gyong | (Japan) Miu Hirano (Japan) Mima Ito | (Hong Kong) Jiang Huajun (Hong Kong) Tie Ya Na |
| 2017 | Wuxi | (China) Chen Meng (China) Zhu Yuling | (China) Chen Ke (China) Wang Manyu | (Japan) Honoka Hashimoto (Japan) Hitomi Sato |
| 2017 | Wuxi | (China) Chen Meng (China) Zhu Yuling | (China) Chen Ke (China) Wang Manyu | (Japan) Hina Hayata (Japan) Mima Ito |
| 2019 | Yogyakarta | (China) Ding Ning (China) Zhu Yuling | (China) Chen Meng (China) Wang Manyu | (Japan) Miu Hirano (Japan) Kasumi Ishikawa |
| 2019 | Yogyakarta | (China) Ding Ning (China) Zhu Yuling | (China) Chen Meng (China) Wang Manyu | (Japan) Hitomi Sato (Japan) Saki Shibata |
| 2021 | Doha | (South Korea) Jeon Ji-hee (South Korea) Shin Yu-bin | (Hong Kong) Doo Hoi Kem (Hong Kong) Lee Ho Ching | (Japan) Minami Ando (Japan) Miyu Nagasaki |
| 2021 | Doha | (South Korea) Jeon Ji-hee (South Korea) Shin Yu-bin | (Hong Kong) Doo Hoi Kem (Hong Kong) Lee Ho Ching | (Chinese Taipei) Cheng Hsien-tzu (Chinese Taipei) Liu Hsing-yin |
| 2023 | Pyeongchang | (China) Chen Meng (China) Wang Manyu | (China) Sun Yingsha (China) Wang Yidi | (South Korea) Jeon Ji-hee (South Korea) Shin Yu-bin |
| 2023 | Pyeongchang | (China) Chen Meng (China) Wang Manyu | (China) Sun Yingsha (China) Wang Yidi | (Japan) Miyuu Kihara (Japan) Miyu Nagasaki |
| 2024 | Astana | (Japan) Satsuki Odo (Japan) Sakura Yokoi | (Japan) Miwa Harimoto (Japan) Miyuu Kihara | (China) Chen Xingtong (China) Kuai Man |
| 2024 | Astana | (Japan) Satsuki Odo (Japan) Sakura Yokoi | (Japan) Miwa Harimoto (Japan) Miyuu Kihara | (India) Ayhika Mukherjee (India) Sutirtha Mukherjee |
| 2026 | Tashkent | (China) Kuai Man (China) Wang Yidi | (Japan) Miwa Harimoto (Japan) Hina Hayata | (China) Chen Yi (China) Jiang Yiyi |
| 2026 | Tashkent | (China) Kuai Man (China) Wang Yidi | (Japan) Miwa Harimoto (Japan) Hina Hayata | (Japan) Miyu Nagasaki (Japan) Satsuki Odo |

=== Mixed doubles ===
| Year | Host City | Gold | Silver | Bronze |
|---|---|---|---|---|
| 1972 | Beijing | (Japan) Nobuhiko Hasegawa (Japan) Yasuko Konno | (Japan) Mitsuru Kono (Japan) Sachiko Yokota | (China) Liang Geliang (China) Li Li |
| 1972 | Beijing | (Japan) Nobuhiko Hasegawa (Japan) Yasuko Konno | (Japan) Mitsuru Kono (Japan) Sachiko Yokota | (Japan) Tokio Tasaka (Japan) Yukie Ozeki |
| 1974 | Yokohama | (Japan) Mitsuru Kono (Japan) Tomie Edano | (China) Li Zhenshi (China) Zhang Li | (Japan) Nobuhiko Hasegawa (Japan) Tazuko Abe |
| 1974 | Yokohama | (Japan) Mitsuru Kono (Japan) Tomie Edano | (China) Li Zhenshi (China) Zhang Li | (Japan) Tetsuo Inoue (Japan) Sachiko Yokota |
| 1976 | Pyongyang | (Japan) Tetsuo Inoue (Japan) Mitsuko Shimamoto | (China) Liang Geliang (China) Ge Xin'ai | (China) Li Peng (China) Zhang Kangmei |
| 1976 | Pyongyang | (Japan) Tetsuo Inoue (Japan) Mitsuko Shimamoto | (China) Liang Geliang (China) Ge Xin'ai | (China) Li Zhenshi (China) Zhang Deying |
| 1978 | Kuala Lumpur | (Japan) Seiji Ono (Japan) Kayo Sugaya | (China) Guo Yuehua (China) Zhang Li | (China) Huang Dongsheng (China) Yang Ying |
| 1978 | Kuala Lumpur | (Japan) Seiji Ono (Japan) Kayo Sugaya | (China) Guo Yuehua (China) Zhang Li | (China) Liang Geliang (China) Zhang Deying |
| 1980 | Calcutta | (China) Xie Saike (China) Zhang Deying | (China) Guo Yuehua (China) Liu Yang | (China) Cai Zhenhua (China) Qi Baoxiang |
| 1980 | Calcutta | (China) Xie Saike (China) Zhang Deying | (China) Guo Yuehua (China) Liu Yang | (Japan) Shigero Fukue (Japan) Yoshiko Shimauchi |
| 1982 | Jakarta | (China) Jiang Jialiang (China) Tong Ling | (China) Guo Yuehua (China) Li Chunli | (China) Cai Zhenhua (China) Cao Yanhua |
| 1982 | Jakarta | (China) Jiang Jialiang (China) Tong Ling | (China) Guo Yuehua (China) Li Chunli | (China) Xie Saike (China) Huang Junqun |
| 1984 | Islamabad | (China) Xie Saike (China) Dai Lili | (China) Wang Huiyuan (China) He Zhili | (China) Chen Longcan (China) Jiao Zhimin |
| 1984 | Islamabad | (China) Xie Saike (China) Dai Lili | (China) Wang Huiyuan (China) He Zhili | (Japan) Kiyoshi Saito (Japan) Yoshiko Shimauchi |
| 1986 | Shenzhen | (China) Hui Jun (China) Geng Lijuan | (South Korea) Kim Wan (South Korea) Hyun Jung-hwa | (North Korea) Kim Song-hui (North Korea) Li Bun-hui |
| 1986 | Shenzhen | (China) Hui Jun (China) Geng Lijuan | (South Korea) Kim Wan (South Korea) Hyun Jung-hwa | (China) Teng Yi (China) Dai Lili |
| 1988 | Niigata | (South Korea) Yoo Nam-kyu (South Korea) Hyun Jung-hwa | (China) Jiang Jialiang (China) Jiao Zhimin | (Chinese Taipei) Liu Wei-chung (Chinese Taipei) Chang Hsiu-yu |
| 1988 | Niigata | (South Korea) Yoo Nam-kyu (South Korea) Hyun Jung-hwa | (China) Jiang Jialiang (China) Jiao Zhimin | (China) Wei Qingguang (China) Li Huifen |
| 1990 | Kuala Lumpur | (South Korea) Yoo Nam-kyu (South Korea) Hyun Jung-hwa | (South Korea) Kim Taek-soo (South Korea) Hong Cha-ok | (North Korea) Kim Guk-chol (North Korea) Yu Sun-bok |
| 1990 | Kuala Lumpur | (South Korea) Yoo Nam-kyu (South Korea) Hyun Jung-hwa | (South Korea) Kim Taek-soo (South Korea) Hong Cha-ok | (China) Ma Wenge (China) Hu Xiaoxin |
| 1992 | New Delhi | (China) Liu Guoliang (China) Wu Na | (South Korea) Lee Chul-seung (South Korea) Ryu Ji-hye | (Chinese Taipei) Chih Chin-shui (Chinese Taipei) Chen Chiu-tan |
| 1992 | New Delhi | (China) Liu Guoliang (China) Wu Na | (South Korea) Lee Chul-seung (South Korea) Ryu Ji-hye | (China) Xie Chaojie (China) Tang Weiyi |
| 1994 | Tianjin | (China) Kong Linghui (China) Deng Yaping | (China) Wang Tao (China) Liu Wei | (China) Liu Guoliang (China) Qiao Hong |
| 1994 | Tianjin | (China) Kong Linghui (China) Deng Yaping | (China) Wang Tao (China) Liu Wei | (China) Lü Lin (China) Qiao Yunping |
| 1996 | Kallang | (China) Ma Lin (China) Wu Na | (China) Liu Guoliang (China) Wang Nan | (South Korea) Kim Taek-soo (South Korea) Park Hae-jung |
| 1996 | Kallang | (China) Ma Lin (China) Wu Na | (China) Liu Guoliang (China) Wang Nan | (South Korea) Oh Sang-eun (South Korea) Ryu Ji-hye |
| 1998 | Osaka | (China) Wang Liqin (China) Wang Nan | (South Korea) Lee Chul-seung (South Korea) Ryu Ji-hye | (South Korea) Oh Sang-eun (South Korea) Kim Moo-kyo |
| 1998 | Osaka | (China) Wang Liqin (China) Wang Nan | (South Korea) Lee Chul-seung (South Korea) Ryu Ji-hye | (South Korea) Park Sang-joon (South Korea) Park Hae-jung |
| 2000 | Doha | (China) Yan Sen (China) Yang Ying | (South Korea) Kim Taek-soo (South Korea) Lee Eun-sil | (Chinese Taipei) Chang Yen-shu (Chinese Taipei) Tsui Hsiu-li |
| 2000 | Doha | (China) Yan Sen (China) Yang Ying | (South Korea) Kim Taek-soo (South Korea) Lee Eun-sil | (South Korea) Lee Chul-seung (South Korea) Ryu Ji-hye |
| 2003 | Bangkok | (China) Liu Guozheng (China) Li Nan | (Japan) Akira Kito (Japan) An Konishi | (Hong Kong) Cheung Yuk (Hong Kong) Tie Ya Na |
| 2003 | Bangkok | (China) Liu Guozheng (China) Li Nan | (Japan) Akira Kito (Japan) An Konishi | (China) Tang Peng (China) Guo Yan |
| 2005 | Jeju-do | (China) Wang Liqin (China) Guo Yue | (Hong Kong) Ko Lai Chak (Hong Kong) Zhang Rui | (China) Ma Long (China) Li Xiaoxia |
| 2005 | Jeju-do | (China) Wang Liqin (China) Guo Yue | (Hong Kong) Ko Lai Chak (Hong Kong) Zhang Rui | (Japan) Kaii Yoshida (Japan) Haruna Fukuoka |
| 2007 | Yangzhou | (South Korea) Oh Sang-eun (South Korea) Kwak Bang-bang | (Hong Kong) Ko Lai Chak (Hong Kong) Tie Ya Na | (South Korea) Choi Hyun-jin (South Korea) Shim Se-rom |
| 2007 | Yangzhou | (South Korea) Oh Sang-eun (South Korea) Kwak Bang-bang | (Hong Kong) Ko Lai Chak (Hong Kong) Tie Ya Na | (North Korea) Kim Hyok-bong (North Korea) Kim Jong |
| 2009 | Lucknow | (China) Ma Long (China) Li Xiaoxia | (China) Zhang Jike (China) Ding Ning | (Japan) Seiya Kishikawa (Japan) Ai Fukuhara |
| 2009 | Lucknow | (China) Ma Long (China) Li Xiaoxia | (China) Zhang Jike (China) Ding Ning | (China) Xu Xin (China) Liu Shiwen |
| 2011 | Macau | (China) Xu Xin (China) Guo Yan | (Singapore) Gao Ning (Singapore) Li Jiawei | (North Korea) Kim Hyok-bong (North Korea) Kim Jong |
| 2011 | Macau | (China) Xu Xin (China) Guo Yan | (Singapore) Gao Ning (Singapore) Li Jiawei | (Japan) Kenji Matsudaira (Japan) Misako Wakamiya |
| 2013 | Busan | (South Korea) Lee Sang-su (South Korea) Park Young-sook | (Japan) Koki Niwa (Japan) Sayaka Hirano | (China) Fan Zhendong (China) Chen Meng |
| 2013 | Busan | (South Korea) Lee Sang-su (South Korea) Park Young-sook | (Japan) Koki Niwa (Japan) Sayaka Hirano | (China) Yan An (China) Zhu Yuling |
| 2015 | Pattaya | (China) Fan Zhendong (China) Chen Meng | (Singapore) Yang Zi (Singapore) Yu Mengyu | (North Korea) Choe Il (North Korea) Ri Mi-gyong |
| 2015 | Pattaya | (China) Fan Zhendong (China) Chen Meng | (Singapore) Yang Zi (Singapore) Yu Mengyu | (Japan) Yuya Oshima (Japan) Misako Wakamiya |
| 2017 | Wuxi | (China) Zhou Yu (China) Chen Xingtong | (Japan) Masataka Morizono (Japan) Mima Ito | (China) Fang Bo (China) Wang Manyu |
| 2017 | Wuxi | (China) Zhou Yu (China) Chen Xingtong | (Japan) Masataka Morizono (Japan) Mima Ito | (Japan) Kenta Tazoe (Japan) Miyu Maeda |
| 2019 | Yogyakarta | (China) Xu Xin (China) Liu Shiwen | (China) Wang Chuqin (China) Sun Yingsha | (South Korea) Lee Sang-su (South Korea) Jeon Ji-hee |
| 2019 | Yogyakarta | (China) Xu Xin (China) Liu Shiwen | (China) Wang Chuqin (China) Sun Yingsha | (Hong Kong) Wong Chun-ting (Hong Kong) Doo Hoi Kem |
| 2021 | Doha | (Japan) Shunsuke Togami (Japan) Hina Hayata | (South Korea) Jang Woo-jin (South Korea) Jeon Ji-hee | (Hong Kong) Ho Kwan-kit (Hong Kong) Lee Ho Ching |
| 2021 | Doha | (Japan) Shunsuke Togami (Japan) Hina Hayata | (South Korea) Jang Woo-jin (South Korea) Jeon Ji-hee | (Hong Kong) Wong Chun-ting (Hong Kong) Doo Hoi Kem |
| 2023 | Pyeongchang | (China) Lin Gaoyuan (China) Wang Yidi | (China) Liang Jingkun (China) Qian Tianyi | (South Korea) Lim Jong-hoon (South Korea) Shin Yu-bin |
| 2023 | Pyeongchang | (China) Lin Gaoyuan (China) Wang Yidi | (China) Liang Jingkun (China) Qian Tianyi | (Chinese Taipei) Lin Yun-ju (Chinese Taipei) Chen Szu-yu |
| 2024 | Astana | (China) Lin Shidong (China) Kuai Man | (North Korea) Ri Jong-sik (North Korea) Kim Kum Yong | (North Korea) Ham Yu-song (North Korea) Pyon Song-gyong |
| 2024 | Astana | (China) Lin Shidong (China) Kuai Man | (North Korea) Ri Jong-sik (North Korea) Kim Kum Yong | (South Korea) Lim Jong-hoon (South Korea) Shin Yu-bin |
| 2026 | Tashkent | (Japan) Sora Matsushima (Japan) Miwa Harimoto | (China) Huang Youzheng (China) Chen Yi | (India) Harmeet Desai (India) Yashaswini Ghorpade |
| 2026 | Tashkent | (Japan) Sora Matsushima (Japan) Miwa Harimoto | (China) Huang Youzheng (China) Chen Yi | (South Korea) Park Gyuhyeon (South Korea) Park Gahyeon |

=== Results of Team Events ===
The tables below are Asian Table Tennis Champions lists of teams events.

=== Men's team ===
| Year | Host City | Gold | Silver | Bronze |
|---|---|---|---|---|
| 1972 | Beijing | (Japan) Japan; Toshiaki Furukawa; Nobuhiko Hasegawa; Tetsuo Inoue; Mitsuru Kono; Tokio Tasaka | China | North Korea |
| 1974 | Yokohama | (China) China; Diao Wenyuan; Li Zhenshi; Wang Jialin; Xi Enting; Xu Shaofa | Japan | Hong Kong |
| 1976 | Pyongyang | (China) China; Guo Yuehua; Guo Zhonggong; Li Peng; Li Zhenshi; Liang Geliang | Japan | North Korea |
| 1978 | Kuala Lumpur | (China) China; Chen Xinhua; Guo Yuehua; Huang Dongsheng; Liang Geliang; Lu Yaohua | North Korea | Japan |
| 1980 | Calcutta | (China) China; Cai Zhenhua; Guo Yuehua; Huang Liang; Shi Zhihao; Xie Saike | Japan | North Korea |
| 1982 | Jakarta | (China) China; Cai Zhenhua; Guo Yuehua; Jiang Jialiang; Xie Saike | Japan | North Korea |
| 1984 | Islamabad | (China) China; Chen Longcan; Teng Yi; Wang Huiyuan; Xie Saike | North Korea | Japan |
| 1986 | Shenzhen | (China) China; Chen Pingxi; Jiang Jialiang; Sun Jianwei; Teng Yi; Wang Hao (born 1966) | North Korea | South Korea |
| 1988 | Niigata | (China) China; Chen Longcan; Geng Zhen; Jiang Jialiang; Wei Qingguang; Xu Zengcai | North Korea | South Korea |
| 1990 | Kuala Lumpur | (China) China; Lin Zhigang; Lü Lin; Ma Wenge; Wang Tao; Xie Chaojie | North Korea | South Korea |
| 1992 | New Delhi | (China) China; Li Yi; Liu Guoliang; Wei Qingguang; Xie Chaojie | North Korea | South Korea |
| 1994 | Tianjin | (China) China; Kong Linghui; Lin Zhigang; Liu Guoliang; Lü Lin; Wang Tao | South Korea | Japan |
| 1996 | Kallang | (South Korea) South Korea; Kang Hee-chan; Kim Dae-yun; Kim Taek-soo; Oh Sang-eun | China | Chinese Taipei |
| 1998 | Osaka | (China) China; Liu Guoliang; Liu Guozheng; Ma Lin; Wang Liqin; Yan Sen | South Korea | Chinese Taipei |
| 2000 | Doha | (China) China; Liu Guozheng; Ma Lin; Wang Liqin; Xu Hui; Yan Sen | Chinese Taipei | Japan |
| 2000 | Doha | (China) China; Liu Guozheng; Ma Lin; Wang Liqin; Xu Hui; Yan Sen | Chinese Taipei | South Korea |
| 2003 | Bangkok | (China) China; Hou Yingchao; Liu Guozheng; Tang Peng; Wang Hao (born 1983); Wang Jianjun | Chinese Taipei | Hong Kong |
| 2003 | Bangkok | (China) China; Hou Yingchao; Liu Guozheng; Tang Peng; Wang Hao (born 1983); Wang Jianjun | Chinese Taipei | South Korea |
| 2005 | Jeju-do | (China) China; Chen Qi; Hao Shuai; Ma Long; Wang Hao (born 1983); Wang Liqin | South Korea | Hong Kong |
| 2007 | Yangzhou | (China) China; Chen Qi; Hao Shuai; Ma Lin; Ma Long; Wang Hao (born 1983) | Japan | Chinese Taipei |
| 2007 | Yangzhou | (China) China; Chen Qi; Hao Shuai; Ma Lin; Ma Long; Wang Hao (born 1983) | Japan | Hong Kong |
| 2009 | Lucknow | (China) China; Ma Long; Wang Liqin; Wu Hao; Xu Xin; Zhang Jike | Japan | Hong Kong |
| 2011 | Macau | (China) China; Ma Lin; Ma Long; Wang Hao (born 1983); Xu Xin; Zhang Jike | Japan | Chinese Taipei |
| 2011 | Macau | (China) China; Ma Lin; Ma Long; Wang Hao (born 1983); Xu Xin; Zhang Jike | Japan | South Korea |
| 2013 | Busan | (China) China; Fan Zhendong; Ma Long; Xu Xin; Yan An; Zhou Yu | Japan | Chinese Taipei |
| 2013 | Busan | (China) China; Fan Zhendong; Ma Long; Xu Xin; Yan An; Zhou Yu | Japan | South Korea |
| 2015 | Pattaya | (China) China; Fan Zhendong; Fang Bo; Ma Long; Xu Xin; Zhang Jike | Japan | Chinese Taipei |
| 2015 | Pattaya | (China) China; Fan Zhendong; Fang Bo; Ma Long; Xu Xin; Zhang Jike | Japan | South Korea |
| 2017 | Wuxi | (China) China; Cui Qinglei; Fan Zhendong; Ma Long; Xu Xin; Zhang Jike | South Korea | Chinese Taipei |
| 2017 | Wuxi | (China) China; Cui Qinglei; Fan Zhendong; Ma Long; Xu Xin; Zhang Jike | South Korea | Japan |
| 2019 | Yogyakarta | (China) China; Fan Zhendong; Liang Jingkun; Lin Gaoyuan; Wang Chuqin; Xu Xin | South Korea | Chinese Taipei |
| 2019 | Yogyakarta | (China) China; Fan Zhendong; Liang Jingkun; Lin Gaoyuan; Wang Chuqin; Xu Xin | South Korea | Japan |
| 2021 | Doha | (South Korea) South Korea; An Jae-hyun; Cho Seung-min; Jang Woo-jin; Lee Sang-su; Lim Jong-hoon | Chinese Taipei | India |
| 2021 | Doha | (South Korea) South Korea; An Jae-hyun; Cho Seung-min; Jang Woo-jin; Lee Sang-su; Lim Jong-hoon | Chinese Taipei | Japan |
| 2023 | Pyeongchang | (China) China; Fan Zhendong; Liang Jingkun; Lin Gaoyuan; Ma Long; Wang Chuqin | Chinese Taipei | India |
| 2023 | Pyeongchang | (China) China; Fan Zhendong; Liang Jingkun; Lin Gaoyuan; Ma Long; Wang Chuqin | Chinese Taipei | South Korea |
| 2024 | Astana | (China) China; Liang Jingkun; Lin Gaoyuan; Lin Shidong; Wang Chuqin; Zhou Qihao | Chinese Taipei | North Korea |
| 2024 | Astana | (China) China; Liang Jingkun; Lin Gaoyuan; Lin Shidong; Wang Chuqin; Zhou Qihao | Chinese Taipei | South Korea |
| 2025 | Bhubaneswar | (China) China; Liang Jingkun; Lin Shidong; Wang Chuqin; Xiang Peng; Zhou Qihao | Hong Kong | Chinese Taipei |
| 2025 | Bhubaneswar | (China) China; Liang Jingkun; Lin Shidong; Wang Chuqin; Xiang Peng; Zhou Qihao | Hong Kong | Japan |
| 2026 | Tashkent | (China) China; Huang Youzheng; Lin Shidong; Wen Ruibo; Xiang Peng; Zhou Qihao | South Korea | Chinese Taipei |
| 2026 | Tashkent | (China) China; Huang Youzheng; Lin Shidong; Wen Ruibo; Xiang Peng; Zhou Qihao | South Korea | Japan |

=== Women's team ===
| Year | Host City | Gold | Silver | Bronze |
|---|---|---|---|---|
| 1972 | Beijing | (China) China; Hu Yulan; Li Li; Liu Xinyan; Qiu Baoqin | Japan | North Korea |
| 1974 | Yokohama | (Japan) Japan; Tazuko Abe; Tomie Edano; Yukie Ozeki; Sachiko Yokota | China | Malaysia |
| 1976 | Pyongyang | (North Korea) North Korea; Hong Gil-soon; Kim Chang-ae; Pak Yong-ok; Pak Yung-sun | China | Japan |
| 1978 | Kuala Lumpur | (China) China; Cao Yanhua; Yang Ying (born 1953); Zhang Deying; Zhang Li | North Korea | Japan |
| 1980 | Calcutta | (China) China; Liu Yang; Qi Baoxiang; Tong Ling; Zhang Deying | North Korea | Japan |
| 1982 | Jakarta | (China) China; Cao Yanhua; Huang Junqun; Li Chunli; Tong Ling | Japan | North Korea |
| 1984 | Islamabad | (China) China; Dai Lili; Geng Lijuan; He Zhili; Jiao Zhimin | North Korea | South Korea |
| 1986 | Shenzhen | (China) China; Dai Lili; He Zhili; Jiao Zhimin; Li Huifen | North Korea | South Korea |
| 1988 | Niigata | (South Korea) South Korea; Hong Cha-ok; Hyun Jung-hwa; Yang Young-ja | North Korea | China |
| 1990 | Kuala Lumpur | (South Korea) South Korea; Hong Cha-ok; Hong Soon-hwa; Hyun Jung-hwa; Lee Tae-joo | North Korea | China |
| 1992 | New Delhi | (Hong Kong) Hong Kong; Chai Po Wa; Chan Suk Yuen; Chan Tan Lui; Cheng To | China | North Korea |
| 1994 | Tianjin | (China) China; Deng Yaping; Liu Wei; Qiao Hong; Qiao Yunping | Hong Kong | South Korea |
| 1996 | Kallang | (China) China; Li Ju; Wang Chen; Wang Hui; Wang Nan; Wu Na | Hong Kong | South Korea |
| 1998 | Osaka | (China) China; Li Ju; Sun Jin; Wang Hui; Wang Nan; Zhang Yining | North Korea | Hong Kong |
| 2000 | Doha | (China) China; Cheng Hongxia; Li Nan; Lin Ling; Sun Jin; Yang Ying (born 1977) | Chinese Taipei | Hong Kong |
| 2000 | Doha | (China) China; Cheng Hongxia; Li Nan; Lin Ling; Sun Jin; Yang Ying (born 1977) | Chinese Taipei | South Korea |
| 2003 | Bangkok | (China) China; Guo Yan; Guo Yue; Li Nan; Li Xiaoxia; Niu Jianfeng | Hong Kong | Japan |
| 2003 | Bangkok | (China) China; Guo Yan; Guo Yue; Li Nan; Li Xiaoxia; Niu Jianfeng | Hong Kong | Singapore |
| 2005 | Jeju-do | (Hong Kong) Hong Kong; Lau Sui Fei; Lin Ling; Song Ah Sim; Tie Ya Na; Zhang Rui | South Korea | China |
| 2007 | Yangzhou | (China) China; Guo Yan; Guo Yue; Li Xiaoxia; Wang Nan; Zhang Yining | Singapore | Hong Kong |
| 2007 | Yangzhou | (China) China; Guo Yan; Guo Yue; Li Xiaoxia; Wang Nan; Zhang Yining | Singapore | Japan |
| 2009 | Lucknow | (China) China; Ding Ning; Fan Ying; Li Xiaoxia; Liu Shiwen; Wu Yang | Singapore | South Korea |
| 2011 | Macau | (China) China; Ding Ning; Guo Yan; Guo Yue; Li Xiaoxia; Liu Shiwen | Singapore | Japan |
| 2011 | Macau | (China) China; Ding Ning; Guo Yan; Guo Yue; Li Xiaoxia; Liu Shiwen | Singapore | South Korea |
| 2013 | Busan | (China) China; Chen Meng; Ding Ning; Guo Yue; Liu Shiwen; Zhu Yuling | Hong Kong | Japan |
| 2013 | Busan | (China) China; Chen Meng; Ding Ning; Guo Yue; Liu Shiwen; Zhu Yuling | Hong Kong | Singapore |
| 2015 | Pattaya | (China) China; Chen Meng; Ding Ning; Liu Shiwen; Mu Zi; Zhu Yuling | Japan | Hong Kong |
| 2015 | Pattaya | (China) China; Chen Meng; Ding Ning; Liu Shiwen; Mu Zi; Zhu Yuling | Japan | South Korea |
| 2017 | Wuxi | (China) China; Chen Meng; Ding Ning; Liu Shiwen; Wu Yang; Zhu Yuling | Japan | Hong Kong |
| 2017 | Wuxi | (China) China; Chen Meng; Ding Ning; Liu Shiwen; Wu Yang; Zhu Yuling | Japan | South Korea |
| 2019 | Yogyakarta | (China) China; Chen Meng; Ding Ning; Liu Shiwen; Sun Yingsha; Wang Manyu | Japan | Chinese Taipei |
| 2019 | Yogyakarta | (China) China; Chen Meng; Ding Ning; Liu Shiwen; Sun Yingsha; Wang Manyu | Japan | Singapore |
| 2021 | Doha | (Japan) Japan; Minami Ando; Hina Hayata; Miyu Nagasaki; Hitomi Sato; Saki Shibata | South Korea | Hong Kong |
| 2021 | Doha | (Japan) Japan; Minami Ando; Hina Hayata; Miyu Nagasaki; Hitomi Sato; Saki Shibata | South Korea | Singapore |
| 2023 | Pyeongchang | (China) China; Chen Meng; Chen Xingtong; Sun Yingsha; Wang Manyu; Wang Yidi | South Korea | Hong Kong |
| 2023 | Pyeongchang | (China) China; Chen Meng; Chen Xingtong; Sun Yingsha; Wang Manyu; Wang Yidi | South Korea | Japan |
| 2024 | Astana | (Japan) Japan; Hina Hayata; Miwa Harimoto; Mima Ito; Miu Hirano; Satsuki Odo | China | Hong Kong |
| 2024 | Astana | (Japan) Japan; Hina Hayata; Miwa Harimoto; Mima Ito; Miu Hirano; Satsuki Odo | China | India |
| 2025 | Bhubaneswar | (China) China; Chen Xingtong; Kuai Man; Sun Yingsha; Wang Manyu; Wang Yidi | Japan | Singapore |
| 2025 | Bhubaneswar | (China) China; Chen Xingtong; Kuai Man; Sun Yingsha; Wang Manyu; Wang Yidi | Japan | South Korea |
| 2026 | Tashkent | (Japan) Japan; Miwa Harimoto; Honoka Hashimoto; Hina Hayata; Miyu Nagasaki; Satsuki Odo | China | Chinese Taipei |
| 2026 | Tashkent | (Japan) Japan; Miwa Harimoto; Honoka Hashimoto; Hina Hayata; Miyu Nagasaki; Satsuki Odo | China | South Korea |

== See also ==
- Asian Table Tennis Championships
