= 1974 Asian Table Tennis Championships =

- Date: 2–15 April 1974
- Edition: 2nd
- Location: Yokohama, Japan

Champions

Men's singles
- (Japan) Nobuhiko Hasegawa

Women's singles
- (Japan) Tomie Edano

Men's doubles
- (Japan) Nobuhiko Hasegawa / (Japan) Mitsuru Kohno

Women's doubles
- (China) Zhang Li / (China) Zheng Huaiying

Mixed doubles
- (Japan) Mitsuru Kohno / (Japan) Tomie Edano

Men's team
- China

Women's team
- Japan
← 1972 ·	Asian Table Tennis Championships	· 1976 →

The 2nd Asian Table Tennis Championships 1974 were held in Yokohama, Japan, from 2 to 15 April 1974. It was organised by the Japan Table Tennis Association under the authority of Asian Table Tennis Union (ATTU) and International Table Tennis Federation (ITTF).

== Medal summary ==
=== Medal table ===
* Host nation (Japan)

Rank	Nation	Gold	Silver	Bronze	Total
1	Japan*	5	3	7	15
2	China	2	4	2	8
3	Hong Kong	0	0	1	1
3	Malaysia	0	0	1	1
3	North Korea	0	0	1	1
Totals (5 entries)		7	7	12	26

=== Events ===
Event	Gold	Silver	Bronze
Men's singles	(Japan) Nobuhiko Hasegawa	(China) Xi Enting	(China) Li Zhenshi
Men's singles	(Japan) Nobuhiko Hasegawa	(China) Xi Enting	(Japan) Mitsuru Kohno
Women's singles	(Japan) Tomie Edano	(Japan) Yukie Ozeki	(Japan) Tazuko Abe
Women's singles	(Japan) Tomie Edano	(Japan) Yukie Ozeki	(Japan) Sachiko Yokota
Men's doubles	(Japan) Nobuhiko Hasegawa (Japan) Mitsuru Kohno	(China) Diao Wenyuan (China) Li Zhenshi	(China) Xi Enting (China) Xu Shaofa
Men's doubles	(Japan) Nobuhiko Hasegawa (Japan) Mitsuru Kohno	(China) Diao Wenyuan (China) Li Zhenshi	(Japan) Yujiro Imano (Japan) Tokio Tasaka
Women's doubles	(China) Zhang Li (China) Zheng Huaiying	(Japan) Yukie Ozeki (Japan) Sachiko Yokota	(Japan) Tazuko Abe (Japan) Tomie Edano
Women's doubles	(China) Zhang Li (China) Zheng Huaiying	(Japan) Yukie Ozeki (Japan) Sachiko Yokota	(North Korea) Cha Kyung-mi (North Korea) Kim Chang-ae
Mixed doubles	(Japan) Mitsuru Kohno (Japan) Tomie Edano	(China) Li Zhenshi (China) Zhang Li	(Japan) Nobuhiko Hasegawa (Japan) Tazuko Abe
Mixed doubles	(Japan) Mitsuru Kohno (Japan) Tomie Edano	(China) Li Zhenshi (China) Zhang Li	(Japan) Tetsuo Inoue (Japan) Sachiko Yokota
Men's team	China	Japan	Hong Kong
Women's team	Japan	China	Malaysia

== See also ==
- World Table Tennis Championships
- Asian Cup
