= 1971 World Table Tennis Championships – Women's doubles =

Tennis tournament

1971 Women's doubles

The 1971 World Table Tennis Championships women's doubles was the 30th edition of the women's doubles championship. Lin Huiqing and Zheng Minzhi defeated Mieko Hirano and Reiko Sakamoto in the final by three sets to nil.

== Results ==
Round of 16
(Soviet Union) Zoja Rudnova (Soviet Union) Svetlana Grinberg	22	21	19	19	21
(Czechoslovakia) Ilona Voštová (Czechoslovakia) Alica Grofová	20	7	21	21	8
(Japan) Yukie Ozeki (Japan) Miho Hamada	19	21	21	21
(France) Claude Bergeret (France) Sonia Moriceau	21	15	16	16
(Japan) Mieko Fukuno (Japan) Asako Yamaguchi	21	21	15	21
(Hungary) Beatrix Kisházi (England) Jill Shirley	8	16	21	16
(China) Lin Huiqing (China) Zheng Minzhi	21	21	21
(Japan) Kazuko Ito (Japan) Emiko Ohba	19	15	14
(Japan) Naoko Motohashi (Japan) Michiko Sakakibura	17	21	21	21
(Romania) Maria Alexandru (Romania) Eleonora Mihalca	21	13	19	17
(Japan) Setsuko Kobori (Japan) Yukiko Kawamorita	19	21	22	21
(West Germany) Diane Schöler (West Germany) Agnes Simon	21	15	20	17
(Japan) Mieko Hirano (Japan) Reiko Sakamoto	21	21	17	21
(Sweden) Lena Andersson (Sweden) Marita Neidert	18	13	21	17
(Japan) Toshiko Kowada (Japan) Yasuko Konno
(Indonesia) Carla Tedjasukmana (Indonesia) Diana Tedjasukmana

Quarterfinals
(Soviet Union) Rudnova (Soviet Union) Grinberg	22	21	12	14
(Japan) Ozeki (Japan) Hamada	24	13	21	21
(Japan) Fukuno (Japan) Yamagauchi	10	9	21	17
(China) Lin Huiqing (China) Zheng Minzhi	21	21	18	21
(Japan) Motohashi (Japan) Sakakibura	21	19	10	24	18
(Japan) Kobori (Japan) Kawamorita	14	21	21	22	21
(Japan) Hirano (Japan) Sakamoto	13	18	21	24	25
(Japan) Kowada (Japan) Konno	21	21	15	22	23

Semifinals
(Japan) Ozeki (Japan) Hamada	19	20	14
(China) Lin Huiqing (China) Zheng Minzhi	21	22	21
(Japan) Kobori (Japan) Kawamorita	12	14	16
(Japan) Hirano (Japan) Sakamoto	21	21	21

Final
(China) Lin Huiqing (China) Zheng Minzhi	21	21	21
(Japan) Hirano (Japan) Sakamoto	11	16	10

== See also ==
List of World Table Tennis Championships medalists
