= Table tennis at the 1958 Asian Games – Men's team =

Men's team at the 1958 Asian Games
- Venue: Waseda University Gymnasium
- Dates: 25–28 May 1958
- Competitors: 28 from 7 nations

Medalists
gold medal	South Vietnam; Lê Văn Tiết, Mai Văn Hòa, Trần Cảnh Được, Trần Văn Liễu
silver medal	Japan; Seiji Narita, Ichiro Ogimura, Toshiaki Tanaka, Keisuke Tsunoda
bronze medal	Iran; Edmond Beitkhoda, Houshang Bozorgzadeh, Amir Ehteshamzadeh, Hamid Korloo

The men's team table tennis event was part of the table tennis programme and took place between 25 and 28 May, at the Waseda University Gymnasium.

== Schedule ==
All times are Japan Standard Time (UTC+09:00)

Date	Time	Event
Sunday, 25 May 1958	10:00	Round robin
Monday, 26 May 1958	10:00	Round robin
Tuesday, 27 May 1958	10:00	Round robin
Wednesday, 28 May 1958	10:00	Third place playoff

== Results ==
Pos	Team	Pld	W	L	MF	MA
1	South Vietnam	6	6	0	30	10
2	Japan	6	5	1	28	9
3	Iran	6	3 (Note: Third place play-off match: IRN 5–3 ROC)	3	22	20
4	Republic of China	6	3	3	21	20
5	Hong Kong	6	2	4	16	24
6	Philippines	6	1	5	9	28
6	South Korea	6	1	5	13	28

Source: Official report
Notes:

25 May	South Vietnam	5–1	Philippines

Trần Văn Liễu	2–1	Teofilo Ybanez
Lê Văn Tiết	2–0	Deogracias Aguasin
Trần Cảnh Được	1–2	Bienvenido Alcantara
Lê Văn Tiết	2–0	Teofilo Ybanez
Trần Văn Liễu	2–0	Bienvenido Alcantara
Trần Cảnh Được	2–0	Deogracias Aguasin

25 May	Japan	5–1	Republic of China

Keisuke Tsunoda	2–0	Hsieh Chin-ho
Ichiro Ogimura	2–0	Sou Ying-chen
Toshiaki Tanaka	1–2	Li Kou-tin
Ichiro Ogimura	2–0	Hsieh Chin-ho
Keisuke Tsunoda	2–0	Li Kou-tin
Toshiaki Tanaka	2–1	Sou Ying-chen

25 May	South Korea	3–5	Philippines

Choo Chang-bok	0–2	Bienvenido Alcantara
Lee Dal-joon	2–0	Teofilo Ybanez
Park Sung-in	2–0	Ernesto Pingol
Choo Chang-bok	0–2	Teofilo Ybanez
Park Sung-in	1–2	Bienvenido Alcantara
Lee Dal-joon	1–2	Ernesto Pingol
Park Sung-in	2–1	Teofilo Ybanez
Choo Chang-bok	0–2	Ernesto Pingol

25 May	Iran	5–1	Hong Kong

Amir Ehteshamzadeh	2–0	Lau Suk Fong
Houshang Bozorgzadeh	2–0	Sih Su Chu
Edmond Beitkhoda	1–2	Tang Hung Bor
Houshang Bozorgzadeh	2–0	Lau Suk Fong
Amir Ehteshamzadeh	2–1	Tang Hung Bor
Edmond Beitkhoda	2–1	Sih Su Chu

25 May	Japan	5–0	Philippines

Ichiro Ogimura	2–0	Deogracias Aguasin
Seiji Narita	2–0	Bienvenido Alcantara
Toshiaki Tanaka	2–0	Ernesto Pingol
Seiji Narita	2–0	Deogracias Aguasin
Ichiro Ogimura	2–0	Ernesto Pingol

25 May	South Korea	5–3	Hong Kong

Kim Kyung-jun	0–2	Sih Su Chu
Lee Dal-joon	2–0	Li Ping
Park Sung-in	2–0	Tang Hung Bor
Lee Dal-joon	1–2	Sih Su Chu
Kim Kyung-jun	0–2	Tang Hung Bor
Park Sung-in	2–0	Li Ping
Lee Dal-joon	2–1	Tang Hung Bor
Park Sung-in	2–0	Sih Su Chu

25 May	Republic of China	5–3	Iran

Hsieh Chin-ho	0–2	Amir Ehteshamzadeh
Li Kou-tin	2–0	Houshang Bozorgzadeh
Sou Ying-chen	2–1	Hamid Korloo
Li Kou-tin	2–0	Amir Ehteshamzadeh
Hsieh Chin-ho	0–2	Hamid Korloo
Sou Ying-chen	0–2	Houshang Bozorgzadeh
Li Kou-tin	2–0	Hamid Korloo
Sou Ying-chen	2–0	Amir Ehteshamzadeh

26 May	Iran	2–5	South Vietnam

Hamid Korloo	1–2	Trần Văn Liễu
Amir Ehteshamzadeh	0–2	Mai Văn Hòa
Houshang Bozorgzadeh	0–2	Lê Văn Tiết
Amir Ehteshamzadeh	2–0	Trần Văn Liễu
Hamid Korloo	0–2	Lê Văn Tiết
Houshang Bozorgzadeh	2–1	Mai Văn Hòa
Amir Ehteshamzadeh	0–2	Lê Văn Tiết

26 May	Philippines	0–5	Hong Kong

Ernesto Pingol	0–2	Tang Hung Bor
Bienvenido Alcantara	0–2	Sih Su Chu
Teofilo Ybanez	0–2	Lau Suk Fong
Bienvenido Alcantara	0–2	Tang Hung Bor
Ernesto Pingol	0–2	Lau Suk Fong

26 May	South Korea	0–5	Republic of China

Choo Chang-bok	1–2	Chen Kao-shan
Park Sung-in	0–2	Hsieh Chin-ho
Lee Dal-joon	0–2	Li Kou-tin
Park Sung-in	0–2	Chen Kao-shan
Choo Chang-bok	0–2	Li Kou-tin

26 May	Republic of China	1–5	South Vietnam

Sou Ying-chen	1–2	Trần Cảnh Được
Li Kou-tin	1–2	Mai Văn Hòa
Hsieh Chin-ho	0–2	Lê Văn Tiết
Li Kou-tin	2–0	Trần Cảnh Được
Sou Ying-chen	1–2	Lê Văn Tiết
Hsieh Chin-ho	0–2	Mai Văn Hòa

26 May	Japan	5–2	Iran

Toshiaki Tanaka	2–1	Edmond Beitkhoda
Keisuke Tsunoda	0–2	Houshang Bozorgzadeh
Ichiro Ogimura	2–0	Amir Ehteshamzadeh
Keisuke Tsunoda	2–1	Edmond Beitkhoda
Toshiaki Tanaka	1–2	Amir Ehteshamzadeh
Ichiro Ogimura	2–0	Houshang Bozorgzadeh
Keisuke Tsunoda	2–0	Amir Ehteshamzadeh

26 May	South Vietnam	5–1	Hong Kong

Mai Văn Hòa	2–0	Sih Su Chu
Lê Văn Tiết	2–0	Tang Hung Bor
Trần Cảnh Được	2–1	Lau Suk Fong
Lê Văn Tiết	2–0	Sih Su Chu
Mai Văn Hòa	0–2	Lau Suk Fong
Trần Cảnh Được	2–0	Tang Hung Bor

26 May	South Korea	0–5	Japan

Lee Dal-joon	0–2	Keisuke Tsunoda
Park Sung-in	0–2	Seiji Narita
Choo Chang-bok	0–2	Ichiro Ogimura
Park Sung-in	1–2	Keisuke Tsunoda
Lee Dal-joon	0–2	Ichiro Ogimura

27 May	Republic of China	5–2	Philippines

Sou Ying-chen	2–0	Teofilo Ybanez
Li Kou-tin	2–0	Deogracias Aguasin
Chen Kao-shan	1–2	Bienvenido Alcantara
Li Kou-tin	2–0	Teofilo Ybanez
Sou Ying-chen	0–2	Bienvenido Alcantara
Chen Kao-shan	2–1	Deogracias Aguasin
Li Kou-tin	2–0	Bienvenido Alcantara

27 May	South Korea	3–5	Iran

Lee Dal-joon	1–2	Amir Ehteshamzadeh
Park Sung-in	2–0	Edmond Beitkhoda
Choo Chang-bok	0–2	Houshang Bozorgzadeh
Park Sung-in	2–1	Amir Ehteshamzadeh
Lee Dal-joon	0–2	Houshang Bozorgzadeh
Choo Chang-bok	2–0	Edmond Beitkhoda
Park Sung-in	0–2	Houshang Bozorgzadeh
Choo Chang-bok	1–2	Amir Ehteshamzadeh

27 May	Japan	5–1	Hong Kong

Keisuke Tsunoda	2–0	Sih Su Chu
Ichiro Ogimura	2–0	Tang Hung Bor
Seiji Narita	1–2	Lau Suk Fong
Ichiro Ogimura	2–1	Sih Su Chu
Keisuke Tsunoda	2–1	Lau Suk Fong
Seiji Narita	2–0	Tang Hung Bor

27 May	South Korea	2–5	South Vietnam

Lee Dal-joon	0–2	Mai Văn Hòa
Park Sung-in	2–1	Trần Cảnh Được
Choo Chang-bok	0–2	Lê Văn Tiết
Park Sung-in	2–0	Mai Văn Hòa
Lee Dal-joon	1–2	Lê Văn Tiết
Choo Chang-bok	1–2	Trần Cảnh Được
Park Sung-in	0–2	Lê Văn Tiết

27 May	Japan	3–5	South Vietnam

Keisuke Tsunoda	1–2	Mai Văn Hòa
Ichiro Ogimura	2–0	Trần Cảnh Được
Toshiaki Tanaka	0–2	Lê Văn Tiết
Ichiro Ogimura	2–1	Mai Văn Hòa
Keisuke Tsunoda	0–2	Lê Văn Tiết
Toshiaki Tanaka	0–2	Trần Cảnh Được
Ichiro Ogimura	2–1	Lê Văn Tiết
Toshiaki Tanaka	0–2	Trần Cảnh Được

27 May	Hong Kong	5–4	Republic of China

Tang Hung Bor	2–0	Sou Ying-chen
Lau Suk Fong	2–0	Hsieh Chin-ho
Sih Su Chu	0–2	Li Kou-tin
Lau Suk Fong	2–1	Sou Ying-chen
Tang Hung Bor	1–2	Li Kou-tin
Sih Su Chu	1–2	Hsieh Chin-ho
Lau Suk Fong	1–2	Li Kou-tin
Sih Su Chu	2–0	Sou Ying-chen
Tang Hung Bor	2–1	Hsieh Chin-ho

27 May	Iran	5–1	Philippines

Hamid Korloo	2–1	Bienvenido Alcantara
Houshang Bozorgzadeh	2–0	Ernesto Pingol
Amir Ehteshamzadeh	2–0	Deogracias Aguasin
Houshang Bozorgzadeh	2–0	Bienvenido Alcantara
Hamid Korloo	1–2	Deogracias Aguasin
Amir Ehteshamzadeh	2–0	Ernesto Pingol

- Since both Republic of China and Iran were tied on points, a play-off match was played to decide the 3rd team.

28 May	Republic of China	3–5	Iran

Sou Ying-chen	2–0	Amir Ehteshamzadeh
Li Kou-tin	2–0	Hamid Korloo
Hsieh Chin-ho	1–2	Houshang Bozorgzadeh
Li Kou-tin	2–1	Amir Ehteshamzadeh
Sou Ying-chen	1–2	Houshang Bozorgzadeh
Hsieh Chin-ho	0–2	Hamid Korloo
Li Kou-tin	0–2	Houshang Bozorgzadeh
Hsieh Chin-ho	1–2	Amir Ehteshamzadeh
