= Table tennis at the 1958 Asian Games – Men's doubles =

Men's doubles at the 1958 Asian Games
- Venue: Waseda University Gymnasium
- Date: 29–31 May 1958
- Competitors: 28 from 7 nations

Medalists
gold medal	Mai Văn Hòa; Trần Cảnh Được	South Vietnam
silver medal	Li Kou-tin; Sou Ying-chen	Republic of China
bronze medal	Chen Kao-shan; Hsieh Chin-ho	Republic of China
bronze medal	Lê Văn Tiết; Trần Văn Liễu	South Vietnam

The men's doubles table tennis event was part of the table tennis programme and took place between 29 and 31 May, at the Waseda University Gymnasium. 14 teams from 7 nations entered for the tournament, teams from the same NOC would not face each other before the final.

South Vietnam won the gold medal after beating Republic of China (Taiwan) 21–23, 21–17, 21–19, 21–16 in the final.

== Schedule ==
All times are Japan Standard Time (UTC+09:00)

Date	Time	Event
Thursday, 29 May 1958	13:00	1st round
Thursday, 29 May 1958	13:00	Quarterfinals
Thursday, 29 May 1958	13:00	Semifinals
Saturday, 31 May 1958	17:00	Final

== Results ==
Legend

- WO — Won by walkover

1st round
Sih Su Chu (HKG); Tang Hung Bor (HKG)	3
Choo Chang-bok (KOR); Park Sung-in (KOR)	0
Deogracias Aguasin (PHI); Bienvenido Alcantara (PHI)	2
Chen Kao-shan (ROC); Hsieh Chin-ho (ROC)	3
Keisuke Tsunoda (JPN); Seiji Narita (JPN)	3
Amir Ehteshamzadeh (IRN); Houshang Bozorgzadeh (IRN)	2
Li Kou-tin (ROC); Sou Ying-chen (ROC)	3
Hamid Korloo (IRN); Edmond Beitkhoda (IRN)	0
Teofilo Ybanez (PHI); Ernesto Pingol (PHI)	1
Lê Văn Tiết (VNM); Trần Văn Liễu (VNM)	3
Lau Suk Fong (HKG); Li Ping (HKG)	3
Kim Kyung-jun (KOR); Lee Dal-joon (KOR)	2

Quarterfinals
Sih Su Chu (HKG); Tang Hung Bor (HKG)	1
Chen Kao-shan (ROC); Hsieh Chin-ho (ROC)	3
Keisuke Tsunoda (JPN); Seiji Narita (JPN)
Mai Văn Hòa (VNM); Trần Cảnh Được (VNM)	WO
Ichiro Ogimura (JPN); Toshiaki Tanaka (JPN)	2
Li Kou-tin (ROC); Sou Ying-chen (ROC)	3
Lê Văn Tiết (VNM); Trần Văn Liễu (VNM)	3
Lau Suk Fong (HKG); Li Ping (HKG)	1

Semifinals
Chen Kao-shan (ROC); Hsieh Chin-ho (ROC)	0
Mai Văn Hòa (VNM); Trần Cảnh Được (VNM)	3
Li Kou-tin (ROC); Sou Ying-chen (ROC)	3
Lê Văn Tiết (VNM); Trần Văn Liễu (VNM)	1

Final
Mai Văn Hòa (VNM); Trần Cảnh Được (VNM)	3
Li Kou-tin (ROC); Sou Ying-chen (ROC)	1
