= Table tennis at the 1958 Asian Games – Men's singles =

Men's singles at the 1958 Asian Games
- Venue: Waseda University Gymnasium
- Date: 29–31 May 1958
- Competitors: 25 from 7 nations

Medalists
gold medal	Li Kou-tin	Republic of China
silver medal	Keisuke Tsunoda	Japan
bronze medal	Seiji Narita	Japan
bronze medal	Ichiro Ogimura	Japan

The men's singles table tennis event was part of the table tennis programme and took place between 29 and 31 May, at the Waseda University Gymnasium.

== Schedule ==
All times are Japan Standard Time (UTC+09:00)

Date	Time	Event
Thursday, 29 May 1958	13:00	1st round
Friday, 30 May 1958	15:00	2nd round
Friday, 30 May 1958	15:00	Quarterfinals
Friday, 30 May 1958	15:00	Semifinals
Saturday, 31 May 1958	20:00	Final

== Results ==
=== Final ===
Final
Li Kou-tin (ROC)	3
Keisuke Tsunoda (JPN)	0

=== Top half ===
1st round
Hamid Korloo (IRN)	2
Trần Văn Liễu (VNM)	3
Bienvenido Alcantara (PHI)	1
Park Sung-in (KOR)	3
Seiji Narita (JPN)	3
Amir Ehteshamzadeh (IRN)	1
Chen Kao-shan (ROC)	2
Deogracias Aguasin (PHI)	3
Lee Dal-joon (KOR)	2
Lau Suk Fong (HKG)	3

2nd round
Toshiaki Tanaka (JPN)	3
Trần Văn Liễu (VNM)	0
Li Kou-tin (ROC)	3
Park Sung-in (KOR)	1
Bye
Seiji Narita (JPN)
Deogracias Aguasin (PHI)	0
Lau Suk Fong (HKG)	3

Quarterfinals
Toshiaki Tanaka (JPN)	2
Li Kou-tin (ROC)	3
Seiji Narita (JPN)	3
Lau Suk Fong (HKG)	2

Semifinals
Li Kou-tin (ROC)	3
Seiji Narita (JPN)	2

=== Bottom half ===
1st round
Keisuke Tsunoda (JPN)	3
Ernesto Pingol (PHI)	0
Lê Văn Tiết (VNM)	3
Edmond Beitkhoda (IRN)	0
Sou Ying-chen (ROC)	2
Tang Hung Bor (HKG)	3
Trần Cảnh Được (VNM)	2
Teofilo Ybanez (PHI)	3
Li Ping (HKG)	0
Houshang Bozorgzadeh (IRN)	3

2nd round
Keisuke Tsunoda (JPN)	3
Kim Kyung-jun (KOR)	1
Lê Văn Tiết (VNM)	3
Tang Hung Bor (HKG)	0
Teofilo Ybanez (PHI)	0
Houshang Bozorgzadeh (IRN)	3
Hsieh Chin-ho (ROC)	2
Ichiro Ogimura (JPN)	3

Quarterfinals
Keisuke Tsunoda (JPN)	3
Lê Văn Tiết (VNM)	0
Houshang Bozorgzadeh (IRN)	0
Ichiro Ogimura (JPN)	3

Semifinals
Keisuke Tsunoda (JPN)	3
Ichiro Ogimura (JPN)	1
