= 1971 World Table Tennis Championships – Mixed doubles =

1971 Mixed doubles

The 1971 World Table Tennis Championships mixed doubles was the 31st edition of the mixed doubles championship.

Zhang Xielin and Lin Huiqing defeated Antun Stipančić and Maria Alexandru in the final by three sets to one.

== Results ==
Round of 16
(Japan) Nobuhiko Hasegawa (Japan) Yasuko Konno	15	21	17	21	21
(Socialist Federal Republic of Yugoslavia) Antun Stipančić (Romania) Maria Alexandru	21	12	21	19	19
(Sweden) Hans Alsér (Soviet Union) Rita Pogosova	22	21	21
(China) Hsi En-ting (China) L'i Li-fen	20	10	13
(Hungary) Mátyás Beleznay (Hungary) Beatrix Kisházi
(Japan) Keitaro Tanaka (Japan) Emiko Ohba
(West Germany) Eberhard Schöler (West Germany) Diane Schöler	21	21	21
(Hungary) Milan Orlowski (Czechoslovakia) Ilona Voštová	9	17	11
(China) Zhang Xielin (China) Lin Huiqing	21	21	21
(Japan) Shigeo Itoh (Japan) Reiko Sakamoto	15	18	17
(Soviet Union) Stanislav Gomozkov (Soviet Union) Zoja Rudnova	12	21	14	21	21
(China) Liang Geliang (China) Zhang Li	21	15	21	18	11
(Japan) Tokuyasu Nishii (Japan) Mieko Fukuno	21	21	21
(Japan) Toshiaki Furukawa (Japan) Kasuko Inoue	10	18	8
(Japan) Mitsuru Kono (Japan) Toshiko Kowada	21	16	21	21
(West Germany) Klaus Schmittinger (West Germany) Marta Hejma-Lužová	17	21	6	18

Quarterfinals
(Socialist Federal Republic of Yugoslavia) Stipančić (Romania) Alexandru	21	22	21
(Sweden) Alsér (Soviet Union) Pogosova	19	20	14
(Hungary) Beleznay (Hungary) Kisházi	17	21	16	21
(West Germany) Schöler (West Germany) Schöler	21	19	21	23
(China) Zhang Xielin (China) Lin Huiqing	12	21	14	21	21
(Soviet Union) Gomozkov (Soviet Union) Rudnova	21	15	21	18	11
(Japan) Nishii (Japan) Fukuno	21	17	21	16	21
(Japan) Kono (Japan) Kowada	19	21	16	21	11

Semifinals
(Socialist Federal Republic of Yugoslavia) Stipančić (Romania) Alexandru	21	21	21
(West Germany) Schöler (West Germany) Schöler	19	11	17
(China) Zhang Xielin (China) Lin Huiqing	19	21	21	21
(Japan) Nishii (Japan) Fukuno	21	15	12	12

Final
(Socialist Federal Republic of Yugoslavia) Stipančić (Romania) Alexandru	19	21	16	18
(China) Zhang Xielin (China) Lin Huiqing	21	15	21	21

== See also ==
List of World Table Tennis Championships medalists
