= 1972 Asian Table Tennis Championships =

- Date: 2–13 September 1972
- Edition: 1st
- Location: Beijing, China

Champions

Men's singles
- (Japan) Nobuhiko Hasegawa

Women's singles
- (China) Li Li

Men's doubles
- (Japan) Tetsuo Inoue / (Japan) Mitsuru Kohno

Women's doubles
- (North Korea) Kim Chang-ae / (North Korea) O Yong-suk

Mixed doubles
- (Japan) Nobuhiko Hasegawa / (Japan) Yasuko Konno

Men's team
- Japan

Women's team
- China
- Asian Table Tennis Championships

The 1st Asian Table Tennis Championships 1972 were held in Beijing, China, from 2 to 13 September 1972. It was organised by the Chinese Table Tennis Association under the authority of Asian Table Tennis Union (ATTU) and International Table Tennis Federation (ITTF).

== Medal summary ==
=== Medal table ===
* Host nation (China)

Rank	Nation	Gold	Silver	Bronze	Total
1	Japan	4	4	1	9
2	China*	2	2	6	10
3	North Korea	1	1	4	6
4	Vietnam	0	0	1	1
Totals (4 entries)		7	7	12	26

=== Events ===
Event	Gold	Silver	Bronze
Men's singles	(Japan) Nobuhiko Hasegawa	(China) Xi Enting	(China) Liang Geliang
Men's singles	(Japan) Nobuhiko Hasegawa	(China) Xi Enting	(China) Wang Wenrong
Women's singles	(China) Li Li	(Japan) Yukie Ozeki	(China) Qiu Baoqin
Women's singles	(China) Li Li	(Japan) Yukie Ozeki	(North Korea) Cha Kyung-mi
Men's doubles	(Japan) Tetsuo Inoue (Japan) Mitsuru Kohno	(Japan) Nobuhiko Hasegawa (Japan) Tokio Tasaka	(China) Liang Geliang (China) Xi Enting
Men's doubles	(Japan) Tetsuo Inoue (Japan) Mitsuru Kohno	(Japan) Nobuhiko Hasegawa (Japan) Tokio Tasaka	(North Korea) Kim Chang-ho (North Korea) Pak Sin-il
Women's doubles	(North Korea) Kim Chang-ae (North Korea) O Yong-suk	(North Korea) Cha Kyung-mi (North Korea) Pak Yong-ok	(China) Hu Yulan (China) Qiu Baoqin
Women's doubles	(North Korea) Kim Chang-ae (North Korea) O Yong-suk	(North Korea) Cha Kyung-mi (North Korea) Pak Yong-ok	(Vietnam) Do Thuy Nga (Vietnam) Nguyen Thi Mai
Mixed doubles	(Japan) Nobuhiko Hasegawa (Japan) Yasuko Konno	(Japan) Mitsuru Kohno (Japan) Sachiko Yokota	(China) Liang Geliang (China) Li Li
Mixed doubles	(Japan) Nobuhiko Hasegawa (Japan) Yasuko Konno	(Japan) Mitsuru Kohno (Japan) Sachiko Yokota	(Japan) Tokio Tasaka (Japan) Yukie Ozeki
Men's team	Japan	China	North Korea
Women's team	China	Japan	North Korea

== See also ==
- World Table Tennis Championships
- Asian Cup
