= 1973 World Table Tennis Championships – Women's doubles =

1973 Women's doubles

The 1973 World Table Tennis Championships women's doubles was the 31st edition of the women's doubles championship. Maria Alexandru and Miho Hamada defeated Chou Pao Chin and Lin Mei Chun in the final by three sets to nil.

== Results ==
Round of 16
(China) Chou Pao Chin (China) Lin Mei Chun	21	21	21
(Poland) Danuta Calinska (Poland) Czeslawa Noworyta	16	14	13
(South Korea) Park Mi-ra (South Korea) Lee Ailesa	21	21	23
(Soviet Union) Narine Antonian (Soviet Union) Asta Gedraitite	18	18	21
(China) Chang Li (China) Cheng Huai Ying	21	21	21
(Sweden) Ann Christin Helman (Sweden) Birgitta Olsson	14	9	13
(Socialist Federal Republic of Yugoslavia) Mirjana Resler (Socialist Federal Republic of Yugoslavia) Erzsébet Palatinus	9	18	10
(Hungary) Beatrix Kisházi (England) Jill Hammersley	21	21	21
(Japan) Yoshiko Takase (Japan) Yasuko Konno	14	16	21	12
(Soviet Union) Zoja Rudnova (Hungary) Judit Magos	21	21	19	21
(West Germany) Wiebke Hendriksen (West Germany) Diane Schöler	9	25	13
(Romania) Maria Alexandru (Japan) Miho Hamada	21	27	21
(Czechoslovakia) Ludmila Smidova (Czechoslovakia) Hana Riedlová	21	17	17	23	21
(Bulgaria) Emilia Neikova (Bulgaria) Albertina Rangelova	14	21	21	21	18
(Japan) Tazuko Abe (Japan) Tomie Edano	23	21	24
(Hungary) Anna Molnar (Hungary) Henriette Lotaller	21	14	22

Quarterfinals
(China) Chou Pao Chin (China) Lin Mei Chun	19	21	21	22
(South Korea) Park Mi-ra (South Korea) Ailesa	21	19	15	20
(China) Chang Li (China) Cheng Huai Ying	12	17	21	19
(Hungary) Kisházi (England) Hammersley	21	21	14	21
(Soviet Union) Rudnova (Hungary) Magos	18	17	21	15
(Romania) Alexandru (Japan) Hamada	21	21	19	21
(Czechoslovakia) Smidova (Czechoslovakia) Riedlová	21	21	16	19	15
(Japan) Abe (Japan) Edano	10	17	21	21	21

Semifinals
(China) Chou Pao Chin (China) Lin Mei Chun	21	18	19	21	21
(Hungary) Kisházi (England) Hammersley	18	21	21	18	19
(Romania) Alexandru (Japan) Hamada	19	21	23	21
(Japan) Abe (Japan) Edano	21	8	21	13

Final
(China) Chou Pao Chin (China) Lin Mei Chun	11	18	14
(Romania) Alexandru (Japan) Hamada	21	21	21

== See also ==
List of World Table Tennis Championships medalists
