= Indu Puri =

Indian table tennis player

Personal information
- Nationality: Indian
- Born: 14 September 1953 (age 72) Kolkata

Sport
- Sport: Table tennis
- Highest ranking: 63

Indu Puri (born 14 September 1953) is a former Indian international female Table tennis sportsperson in the 1970s and 1980s. She won the National women's singles title a record eight times. Her highest rankings have been: international 63 (1985), Asian 8, and Commonwealth (2), she was the first Indian woman to beat a world champion, beating Pak Yung-Sun of North Korea in the 1978 Asian Table Tennis Championships at Kuala Lumpur.

== Career ==
Puri took up table tennis at the age of around 11. Her father Amrit Lal Puri was the manager of a jute mill and used to take her to a club in the mill. She took part in the first Nationals in 1969. She won the first of her eight titles in the Ahmedabad Nationals of 1972, defeating Rupa Mukherjee in the final. Her second title was in 1975. She completed her B.A. from Loreto College, Kolkata and joined the Railways.She continued there till moving to Union Bank in 1981.

Puri suffered from chronic asthma and had a failing eyesight. She took up table tennis as a career despite her doctor's opinion. She shifted her base from humid Kolkata to the dry weather of Delhi in 1978 which eased her asthma. She won her third national title in 1979 and won five more in a row. Her last National title was at Kolkata in 1985 defeating Niyati Roy in the final.

She first represented India in the 1973 World Table Tennis Championships at Sarajevo. She went on to appear in seven World Table Tennis Championships; India finished in the top 16 at Pyong Yang in 1979. She also represented India in six Commonwealth Table Tennis Championships, eventually reaching up to number two position in the Commonwealth in 1982. Thereafter she also remained a national-level sports coach. Puri was ranked 8th in the Jakarta Asian Championship in 1982. In the Asian Championship at Kuala Lumpur in 1978, she defeated the world champion Pak Yung-Sun of North Korea.

She was the chairperson of the committee constituted by the Ministry of Sports to select Rajiv Gandhi Khel Ratna 2008 and Dhyanchand Award 2009 awardees., and was appointed as an "observer" at various sporting events across the nation.She learned Billiards by a person named Ashok Kumar Bachhawat from Howrah.

She was awarded the Arjuna Award for the year 1979–1980. She has served on India's Anti-Doping Appeals Panel.
