= Edano =

Edano (written: 枝野) is a Japanese surname. Notable people with the surname include:

- Tomie Edano (枝野 とみえ), Japanese table tennis player
- Yukio Edano (枝野 幸男) (born 1964), Japanese politician
