= 1978 Asian Table Tennis Championships =

- Date: 22 November – 2 December 1978
- Edition: 4th
- Location: Kuala Lumpur, Malaysia

Champions

Men's singles
- (China) Guo Yuehua

Women's singles
- (China) Cao Yanhua

Men's doubles
- (North Korea) Cho Yong-ho / (North Korea) Yun Chol

Women's doubles
- (North Korea) Kim Chang-ae / (North Korea) Pak Yong-ok

Mixed doubles
- (Japan) Seiji Ono / (Japan) Kayo Sugaya

Men's team
- China

Women's team
- China
- Asian Table Tennis Championships

The 4th Asian Table Tennis Championships 1978 were held in Kuala Lumpur, Malaysia, from 22 November to 2 December 1978. It was organised by the Table Tennis Association of Malaysia under the authority of Asian Table Tennis Union (ATTU) and International Table Tennis Federation (ITTF).

== Medal summary ==
=== Medal table ===
Rank	Nation	Gold	Silver	Bronze	Total
1	China	4	4	8	16
2	North Korea	2	3	1	6
3	Japan	1	0	3	4
Totals (3 entries)		7	7	12	26

=== Events ===
Event	Gold	Silver	Bronze
Men's singles	(China) Guo Yuehua	(China) Liang Geliang	(China) Chen Xinhua
Men's singles	(China) Guo Yuehua	(China) Liang Geliang	(North Korea) Cho Yong-ho
Women's singles	(China) Cao Yanhua	(China) Yang Ying	(China) Zhang Deying
Women's singles	(China) Cao Yanhua	(China) Yang Ying	(China) Zhang Li
Men's doubles	(North Korea) Cho Yong-ho (North Korea) Yun Chol	(China) Guo Yuehua (China) Lu Yaohua	(China) Huang Dongsheng (China) Liang Geliang
Men's doubles	(North Korea) Cho Yong-ho (North Korea) Yun Chol	(China) Guo Yuehua (China) Lu Yaohua	(Japan) Seiji Ono (Japan) Masanori Uchida
Women's doubles	(North Korea) Kim Chang-ae (North Korea) Pak Yong-ok	(North Korea) Cho Jong-hui (North Korea) Li Song-suk	(China) Cao Yanhua (China) Yang Ying
Women's doubles	(North Korea) Kim Chang-ae (North Korea) Pak Yong-ok	(North Korea) Cho Jong-hui (North Korea) Li Song-suk	(China) Zhang Deying (China) Zhang Li
Mixed doubles	(Japan) Seiji Ono (Japan) Kayo Sugaya	(China) Guo Yuehua (China) Zhang Li	(China) Huang Dongsheng (China) Yang Ying
Mixed doubles	(Japan) Seiji Ono (Japan) Kayo Sugaya	(China) Guo Yuehua (China) Zhang Li	(China) Liang Geliang (China) Zhang Deying
Men's team	China	North Korea	Japan
Women's team	China	North Korea	Japan

== See also ==
- World Table Tennis Championships
- Asian Cup
