= Diao Wenyuan =

Chinese table tennis player

Diao Wenyuan (Tiao Wen-yuan)
Personal information
- Nationality: China
- Born: 1943 (age 82–83)
Medal record
Representing China
World Table Tennis Championships
Silver medal – second place	1973	Men's Team

Diao Wenyuan (Chinese: 刁文元; Wade–Giles: Tiao Wen-yuan) is a former international table tennis player and coach from China.

He won a silver medal at the 1973 World Table Tennis Championships in the Swaythling Cup (men's team event) with Li Ching-kuang, Liang Ko-liang, Hsi En-ting and Hsu Shao-Fa for China.

He was the Chinese national singles and doubles champion in 1972.

== See also ==
- List of table tennis players
- List of World Table Tennis Championships medalists
