= Yukiko Kawamorita =

Japanese table tennis player

Personal information
- Nationality: Japan
Medal record
Representing Japan
World Table Tennis Championships
Bronze medal – third place	1971	Women's doubles

Yukiko Kawamorita is a former international table tennis player from Japan.

== Table tennis career ==
She won a bronze medal at the 1971 World Table Tennis Championships in the women's doubles with Setsuko Kobori.

== See also ==
- List of table tennis players
- List of World Table Tennis Championships medalists
