= Chih Chin-shui =

Taiwanese table tennis player

Personal information
- Nationality: Taiwanese
- Born: 2 April 1963 (age 62)

Sport
- Sport: Table tennis

Chih Chin-shui (born 2 April 1963) is a Taiwanese table tennis player. He competed in the men's doubles event at the 1988 Summer Olympics.
