= Kayo Sugaya =

Japanese table tennis player

Personal information
- Nationality: Japan
Medal record
Representing Japan
World Table Tennis Championships
Bronze medal – third place	1979	women's team

Kayo Sugaya (菅谷 佳代) is a former Japanese international table tennis player.

== Table tennis career ==
She won a bronze medal at the 1979 World Table Tennis Championships in the Corbillon Cup (women's team event) with Kayoko Kawahigashi, Yoshiko Shimauchi and Shoko Takahashi for Japan.

She also won an Asian Table Tennis Championships mixed doubles medal.

== See also ==
- List of World Table Tennis Championships medalists
