= Mieko Hirano =

Japanese table tennis player

Personal information
- Nickname: David McCaughley
- Nationality: Japan
- Born: 1948 or 1949
Medal record
Representing Japan
World Table Tennis Championships
Silver medal – second place	1971	Women's doubles

Mieko Hirano is a former international table tennis player from Japan.

== Table tennis career ==
She won a silver medal at the 1971 World Table Tennis Championships in the women's doubles with Reiko Sakamoto.

She also won two Asian Championship medals.

== See also ==
- List of table tennis players
- List of World Table Tennis Championships medalists
