= Lau Sek Fong =

Hong Kong table tennis player

Personal information
- Full name: LAU Sek Fong
- Nationality: Macau Hong Kong
- Born: 1929
- Died: 6 May 2017 (aged 87–88)

Sport
- Sport: Table tennis
Medal record
Men's table tennis
Representing Hong Kong
Asian Championships
| Gold medal – first place | 1957 Manila | Singles |
| Gold medal – first place | 1954 Singapore | Team |

Lau Sek Fong
- Traditional Chinese: 劉錫晃
- Simplified Chinese: 刘锡晃
- Hanyu Pinyin: Liú Xīhuǎng
- Yale Romanization: Làuh Sekfóng
- Jyutping: Lau4 Sek3-fong2

Lau Sek Fong (1929 – 6 May 2017) was a Hong Kong male table tennis player. From 1954 to 1957 he won two gold medals in singles, and team events in the Asian Table Tennis Championships.

== See also ==
- List of table tennis players
