= Lin Meiqun =

Chinese table tennis player

Lin Meiqun (Lin Mei Chun)
Personal information
- Nationality: China
- Born: 1948 (age 77–78)
Medal record
World Table Tennis Championships
Silver medal – second place	1971	Women's Team
Silver medal – second place	1973	Women's Doubles
Silver medal – second place	1975	Women's Doubles

Lin Meiqun (born 1948 in Indonesia) also known as Lin Mei Chun is a former international table tennis player from China.

== Table tennis career ==
She won three silver medals in the World Table Tennis Championships.

During the 1971 World Table Tennis Championships she won a silver for China in the Corbillon Cup (women's team event).

Two further silver medals were won in 1973 and 1975 in the women's doubles with Qiu Baoqin and Zhu Xiangyun respectively.

== See also ==
- List of table tennis players
- List of World Table Tennis Championships medalists
