= Li Peng (table tennis) =

Chinese table tennis player

Personal information
- Nationality: China
- Born: 1955 (age 70–71)
Medal record
Representing China
World Table Tennis Championships
Gold medal – first place	1975	team

Li Peng (born 1955) is a male former international table tennis player from China.

== Table tennis career ==
He won a gold medal at the 1975 World Table Tennis Championships with Li Zhenshi, Liang Geliang, Lu Yuansheng and Xu Shaofa as part of the Chinese team.

== See also ==
- List of table tennis players
- List of World Table Tennis Championships medalists
