= Gool Nasikwala =

Indian table tennis player

Personal information
- Full name: Gool Nasikwala
- Nationality: India

Sport
- Sport: Table tennis
Medal record
Women's table tennis
Representing India
Asian Championships
Gold medal – first place	1952 Singapore	Singles
Gold medal – first place	1952 Singapore	Doubles
Gold medal – first place	1952 Singapore	Mixed Doubles

Gool Nasikwala was a former table tennis player from India. She was the first Indian woman to win medals in international table tennis competitions in 1952.

== Career ==
She was the national champion in 1945 and 1946 which was held at Bombay and Madras.

In 1952, she won gold medals in singles, and doubles events in the Asian Table Tennis Championships in Singapore.

== See also ==
- List of table tennis players
