= Reiko Sakamoto (table tennis) =

Japanese table tennis player

Rieko Sakamoto
Personal information
- Nationality: Japan
- Born: 1950 or 1951
Medal record
Representing Japan
World Table Tennis Championships
| Silver medal – second place | 1971 | Women's doubles |

Reiko Sakamoto is a former international table tennis player from Japan.

== Table tennis career ==
She won a silver medal at the 1971 World Table Tennis Championships in the women's doubles with Mieko Hirano.

She also won an Asian Championship medal.

== See also ==
- List of table tennis players
- List of World Table Tennis Championships medalists
