= Shi Zhihao =

Chinese table tennis player

Personal information
- Full name: SHI Zhihao
- Nationality: China
- Born: 26 September 1959 (age 66)

Sport
- Sport: Table tennis
Medal record
Men's table tennis
Representing China
World Championships
Gold medal – first place	1981 Novi Sad	Team
Asian Championships
Gold medal – first place	1980 Calcutta	Singles
Silver medal – second place	1980 Calcutta	Doubles
Gold medal – first place	1980 Calcutta	Team

Shi Zhihao (Chinese: 施之皓; born September 26, 1959) is a male former table tennis player from China. He won several medals in singles, doubles, and team events at the 1980 Asian Table Tennis Championships. He also won a gold medal in the men's team event at the 1981 World Table Tennis Championships.

He was the head coach of the Chinese women's national team. In 2013, he was elected as the vice president of the International Table Tennis Federation.
