= Manji Fukushima =

Japanese table tennis player

Personal information
- Full name: Fukushima Manji
- Nationality: Japan

Sport
- Sport: Table tennis

Manji Fukushima is a male former table tennis player from Japan. In 1963 he won three gold medals in singles, doubles, and team events in the Asian Table Tennis Championships.
