= Emiko Ohba =

Japanese table tennis player

Personal information
- Nationality: Japan
Medal record
Representing Japan
World Table Tennis Championships
| Gold medal – first place | 1971 | Women's team |

Emiko Ohba (大場 恵美子, Ōba Emiko) is a former international table tennis player from Japan.

== Table tennis career ==
She won a gold medal at the 1971 World Table Tennis Championships in the Corbillon Cup (women's team event) with Yasuko Konno, Toshiko Kowada and Yukie Ohzeki.

She also won an Asian Championship medal.

== See also ==
- List of table tennis players
- List of World Table Tennis Championships medalists
