= Trần Cảnh Được =

Vietnamese table tennis player

Personal information
- Nationality: Vietnam
- Born: 1933 (age 92–93)
Medal record
Representing South Vietnam
World Championships
| Bronze medal – third place | 1959 | Men's Team |

Trần Cảnh Được is a former international table tennis player from Vietnam.

== Table tennis career ==
He won a bronze medal at the 1959 World Table Tennis Championships in the Swaythling Cup (men's team event) for South Vietnam with Mai Văn Hòa, Lê Văn Tiết and Trần Văn Liễu.

He won five Asian Championship medals and two Asian Games medals.

== See also ==
- List of table tennis players
- List of World Table Tennis Championships medalists
