= Sachiko Yokota =

Japanese table tennis player

Personal information
- Nationality: Japan
- Born: 19 May 1952 (age 74)
Medal record
Representing Japan
World Table Tennis Championships
Bronze medal – third place	1973	Women's team
Bronze medal – third place	1975	Women's team
Bronze medal – third place	1975	Women's doubles
Silver medal – second place	1977	Mixed doubles

Sachiko Yokota (横田 幸子, Yokota Sachiko) is a former Japanese international table tennis player.

== Table tennis career ==
She won a three bronze medals at the 1973 World Table Tennis Championships and 1975 World Table Tennis Championships; two in the Corbillon Cup (women's team event) and one in the women's doubles with Yukie Ozeki. Two years later she won a silver medal at the 1977 World Table Tennis Championships in the mixed doubles with Tokio Tasaka.

She is now a representative of the Japanese Table Tennis Association.

== See also ==
- List of table tennis players
- List of World Table Tennis Championships medalists
