= Tokuyasu Nishii =

Japanese table tennis player (1944–2021)

Personal information
- Nationality: Japan
- Born: November 19, 1944
- Died: February 8, 2021 (aged 76)
Medal record
Representing Japan
World Table Tennis Championships
Bronze medal – third place	1971	Mixed Doubles

Tokuyasu Nishii (西飯 徳康, Nishii Tokuyasu) (November 19, 1944 – February 8, 2021) was an international table tennis player from Japan.

He won a bronze medal at the 1971 World Table Tennis Championships in the mixed doubles with Mieko Fukuno.

== See also ==
- List of table tennis players
- List of World Table Tennis Championships medalists
