= Lê Văn Tiết =

Vietnamese table tennis player (1939–2025)

Personal information
- Nationality: Vietnam
- Born: 13 July 1939 Gia Định Province, Cochinchina, French Indochina
- Died: 2 June 2025 (aged 85)
Medal record
Representing South Vietnam
World Championships
| Bronze medal – third place | 1959 | Men's Team |

Lê Văn Tiết (13 July 1939 – 2 June 2025) was an international table tennis player from Vietnam.

== Table tennis career ==
Le won a bronze medal at the 1959 World Table Tennis Championships in the Swaythling Cup (men's team event) for South Vietnam with Mai Văn Hòa, Trần Cảnh Được, and Trần Văn Liễu.

He started playing table tennis aged 8 in Saigon. He won the 1954–55 national title and won three Asian Games medals. He retired in 1975.

== Death ==
Le died on 2 June 2025, at the age of 85.

== See also ==
- List of table tennis players
- List of World Table Tennis Championships medalists
