= Trần Văn Liễu =

Vietnamese table tennis player

Personal information
- Nationality: Vietnam
Medal record
Representing South Vietnam
World Championships
Bronze medal – third place	1959	Men's Team

Trần Văn Liễu is a former international table tennis player from Vietnam.

== Table tennis career ==
He won a bronze medal at the 1959 World Table Tennis Championships in the Swaythling Cup (men's team event) for South Vietnam with Mai Văn Hòa, Lê Văn Tiết and Trần Cảnh Được.

He won an Asian Championship medal and two Asian Games medals.

== See also ==
- List of table tennis players
- List of World Table Tennis Championships medalists
