= Tazuko Abe =

Japanese table tennis player

Personal information
- Nationality: Japanese
Medal record
Representing Japan
World Table Tennis Championships
Bronze medal – third place	1973	Women's doubles

Tazuko Abe (阿部 多津子, Abe Tazuko) is a former international table tennis player from Japan.

== Table tennis career ==
She won a bronze medal at the 1973 World Table Tennis Championships in the women's doubles with Tomie Edano.

She also won three Asian Championship medals.

== See also ==
- List of table tennis players
- List of World Table Tennis Championships medalists
