= Seiji Narita =

Japanese table tennis player

Personal information
- Nationality: Japan
Medal record
Representing Japan
World Championships
Gold medal – first place	1959	Men's Team

Seiji Narita (Japanese: 成田 静司, Hepburn: Narita Seiji) is a former international table tennis player from Japan.

== Table tennis career ==
Narita won a gold medal at the 1959 World Table Tennis Championships in the Swaythling Cup (men's team event) for Japan with Nobuya Hoshino, Teruo Murakami and Ichiro Ogimura.

He won an individual bronze medal during the 1958 Asian Games and at one stage held the number one ranking in Japan.

== See also ==
- List of table tennis players
- List of World Table Tennis Championships medalists
