= Li Kou-tin =

Taiwanese table tennis player (1938–2026)

Personal information
- Full name: Li Kou-tin
- Nationality: Republic of China
- Born: 16 November 1938
- Died: 16 October 2026 (aged 87) Brazil

Sport
- Sport: Table tennis
Medal record
Men's table tennis
Representing Republic of China
Asian Game
Gold medal – first place	1958 Tokyo	Singles
Silver medal – second place	1958 Tokyo	Doubles
Silver medal – second place	1966 Bangkok	Team
Bronze medal – third place	1966 Bangkok	Doubles

Li Kou-tin (Chinese: 李國定; 16 November 1938 – 16 October 2026) was a Taiwanese table tennis player. He won a gold medal in the Men's Singles event at the Asian Games in 1958. Li died in Brazil on 16 October 2026, at the age of 87.
