= Xu Shaofa =

Chinese table tennis player

Xu Shaofa (Hsu Shao-Fa)
Personal information
- Nationality: China
- Born: 1947 (age 78–79)
Medal record
Representing China
World Table Tennis Championships
| Silver medal – second place | 1973 | team |
| Gold medal – first place | 1975 | team |

Xu Shaofa (Hsu Shao-Fa) (born 1947), is a male former international table tennis player from China.

== Table tennis career ==
He won a gold medal at the 1975 World Table Tennis Championships with Li Zhenshi, Liang Geliang, Lu Yuansheng and Li Peng as part of the Chinese team. In addition he won a silver medal in 1973.

== See also ==
- List of table tennis players
- List of World Table Tennis Championships medalists
