= Qiu Baoqin =

Chinese table tennis player

Qiu Baoqin (Chou Pao-Chin)
Personal information
- Nationality: China
- Born: 1944 (age 81–82)
Medal record
World Table Tennis Championships
Silver medal – second place	1973	Women's Doubles

Qiu Baoqin (born 1944) also known as Chou Pao-Chin is a former international table tennis player from China.

== Table tennis career ==
She won a silver medal in the 1973 World Table Tennis Championships with Lin Meiqun.

== See also ==
- List of table tennis players
- List of World Table Tennis Championships medalists
