= Tomie Edano =

Japanese table tennis player

Personal information
- Nationality: Japan

Sport
- Sport: Table tennis
Medal record
Women's table tennis
Representing Japan
World Championships
| Bronze medal – third place | 1975 Calcutta | Women's Team |
| Bronze medal – third place | 1973 Sarajevo | Doubles |
| Bronze medal – third place | 1973 Sarajevo | Women's Team |
Asian Championships
| Bronze medal – third place | 1976 Pyongyang | Doubles |
| Gold medal – first place | 1974 Yokohama | Singles |
| Bronze medal – third place | 1974 Yokohama | Doubles |
| Gold medal – first place | 1974 Yokohama | Mixed Doubles |
| Gold medal – first place | 1974 Yokohama | Women's Team |

Tomie Edano (枝野 とみえ, Edano Tomie) is a former international table tennis player from Japan.

== Table tennis career ==
From 1973 to 1976 she won several medals in singles, doubles, and team events in the World Table Tennis Championships and in the Asian Table Tennis Championships.

Shew on three World Championship bronze medals; two in the Corbillon Cup (team event) in 1973 and 1975 and one in the doubles with Tazuko Abe at the 1973 World Table Tennis Championships.

== See also ==
- List of table tennis players
- List of World Table Tennis Championships medalists
