= Kim Chang-ae =

North Korean table tennis player

Kim Chang-Ae
Personal information
- Full name: Kim Chang-Ae
- Nationality: North Korea

Sport
- Sport: Table tennis

- Kim Chang-ae
- Hangul: 김창애
- RR: Gim Changae
- MR: Kim Ch'angae

Kim Chang-Ae (Korean: 김창애) is a former table tennis player from North Korea. From 1972 to 1978, she won several medals in doubles and team events in the Asian Table Tennis Championships and in the World Table Tennis Championships.
