= Yukie Ozeki =

Japanese table tennis player

Personal information
- Nationality: Japan
- Born: 6 February 1949 (age 77)

Sport
- Sport: Table tennis
Medal record
Women's table tennis
Representing Japan
World Championships
Bronze medal – third place	1975 Calcutta	Doubles
Bronze medal – third place	1975 Calcutta	Mixed Doubles
Bronze medal – third place	1975 Calcutta	Team
Bronze medal – third place	1973 Sarajevo	Team
Bronze medal – third place	1971 Nagoya	Doubles
Gold medal – first place	1971 Nagoya	Team
Asian Championships
Silver medal – second place	1974 Yokohama	Singles
Silver medal – second place	1974 Yokohama	Doubles
Gold medal – first place	1974 Yokohama	Team
Silver medal – second place	1972 Beijing	Singles
Bronze medal – third place	1972 Beijing	Mixed Doubles
Silver medal – second place	1972 Beijing	Team
Gold medal – first place	1968 Jakarta	Singles
Gold medal – first place	1968 Jakarta	Doubles
Silver medal – second place	1968 Jakarta	Team
Silver medal – second place	1967 Singapore	Doubles

Yukie Ozeki (大関 行江, Ōzeki Yukie) is a former international table tennis player from Japan.

== Table tennis career ==
From 1971 to 1975 she won six medals in singles, doubles, and team events in the World Table Tennis Championships and seven medals in the Asian Table Tennis Championships.

Her six World Championship medals included a gold medal at the 1971 World Table Tennis Championships in the Corbillon Cup (women's team event) with Yasuko Konno, Toshiko Kowada and Emiko Ohba.

== See also ==
- List of table tennis players
- List of World Table Tennis Championships medalists
