= Xi Enting =

Chinese table tennis player (1946–2019)

Xi Enting (Hsi En-ting)
Personal information
- Nationality: China
- Born: 3 January 1946
- Died: 27 October 2019 (aged 73)

Sport
- Sport: Table tennis
Medal record
Men's table tennis
Representing China
World Championships
| Gold medal – first place | 1973 Sarajevo | Singles |
| Silver medal – second place | 1973 Sarajevo | Team |
| Bronze medal – third place | 1971 Nagoya | Singles |
| Gold medal – first place | 1971 Nagoya | Team |
Asian Championships
| Silver medal – second place | 1974 Yokohama | Singles |
| Bronze medal – third place | 1974 Yokohama | Doubles |
| Gold medal – first place | 1974 Yokohama | Team |
| Silver medal – second place | 1972 Beijing | Singles |
| Bronze medal – third place | 1972 Beijing | Doubles |
| Silver medal – second place | 1972 Beijing | Team |

Xi Enting (Chinese: 郗恩庭; Wade–Giles: Hsi En-t'ing 3 January 1946 – 27 October 2019) was a male table tennis player from China.

Xi was born in 1946 in Tangshan, Hebei, Republic of China. He trained at Baoding Amateur Sports School and entered the Chinese National Table Tennis Team at age 19.

From 1971 to 1975, Xi won four medals in singles, doubles, and team events in the World Table Tennis Championships and several medals in the Asian Table Tennis Championships.

The four world medals included two gold medals in the men's team event at the 1971 World Table Tennis Championships and the men's singles at the 1973 World Table Tennis Championships.

Xi died from thoracic aortic rupture on 27 October 2019, aged 73.

== See also ==
- List of table tennis players
- List of World Table Tennis Championships medalists
