= Mai Văn Hòa =

Vietnamese table tennis player

Mai Van Hoa
Personal information
- Full name: Mai Văn Hòa
- Nationality: South Vietnam
- Born: 1 June 1927
- Died: 14 May 1971 (aged 43)

Sport
- Sport: Table tennis
Medal record
Men's table tennis
Representing South Vietnam
World Championships
Bronze medal – third place	1959 Dortmund	Team
Asian Championships
Gold medal – first place	1957 Manila	Doubles
Gold medal – first place	1957 Manila	Team
Gold medal – first place	1954 Singapore	Singles
Silver medal – second place	1954 Singapore	Doubles
Gold medal – first place	1953 Tokyo	Singles
Gold medal – first place	1953 Tokyo	Doubles
Silver medal – second place	1953 Tokyo	Team

Mai Văn Hòa (Hanoi, 1 June 1927 – Saigon, 14 May 1971) was a table tennis player from South Vietnam.

From 1953 to 1957 he won several medals in singles, doubles, and team events in the Asian Table Tennis Championships and in the World Table Tennis Championships.

== Results from the ITTF database ==
VAssoc.	Competition	Year	Location	Country	Singles	Doubles	Mixed	Team
VIE R.	Asian Championship TTFA	1957	Manila	PHI		Gold		1
VIE R.	Asian Championship TTFA	1954	Singapur	SIN	Gold	Silver		
VIE R.	Asian Championship TTFA	1953	Tokyo	JPN	Gold	Gold		2
VIE R.	Asian Games	1958	Tokyo	JPN		Gold		1
VIE R.	World Championship	1959	Dortmund	FRG	Rd of 16	Rd of 128	dnp	3
VIE R.	World Championship	1957	Stockholm	SWE	Rd of 32	Rd of 64	Scratched	5
VIE R.	World Championship	1956	Tokyo	JPN	Rd of 32	Rd of 64	dnp	7
VIE R.	World Championship	1955	Utrecht	NED	Rd of 64	Rd of 128	dnp	9
VIE R.	World Championship	1952	Bombay	IND	Rd of 16	Rd of 32	dnp	5
VIE R.	World Championship	1951	Wien	AUT	Rd of 64	Rd of 16	dnp	7
FRA	World Championship	1950	Budapest	HUN	Rd of 64	Rd of 32	dnp	

== See also ==
- List of table tennis players
- Table tennis at the 1958 Asian Games
