= 1969 World Table Tennis Championships – Women's doubles =

1969 Women's doubles

The 1969 World Table Tennis Championships women's doubles was the 29th edition of the women's doubles championship. Svetlana Grinberg and Zoja Rudnova defeated Maria Alexandru and Eleonora Mihalca in the final by three sets to two.

== Results ==
Round of 16
(Japan) Saeko Hirota (Japan) Sachiko Morisawa	21	21	23	21
(South Korea) Kim Soo-kyung (South Korea) Ro Hwa Ja	6	17	25	18
(West Germany) Diane Schöler (Denmark) Wiebke Hendriksen	20	17	21
(Romania) Maria Alexandru (Romania) Eleonora Mihalca	22	21	23
(Hungary) Erzsebet Jurik (Hungary) Beatrix Kisházi	12	21	23	21
(Poland) Dabuta Szmidt-Calinska (Poland) Czeslawa Nowaryla	21	11	21	19
(Czechoslovakia) Ilona Voštová (Czechoslovakia) Jitka Karlíková	21	12	21	21
(Japan) Kazuko Ito-Yamaizumi (Japan) Miho Hamada	21	11	13
(South Korea) Choi Hwan-hwan (South Korea) Choi Jung-sook	21	20	21	18	21
(England) Pauline Piddock (Romania) Carmen Crișan	17	22	18	21	15
(Soviet Union) Asta Gedraitite (East Germany) Petra Stephan	21	21	21
(Japan) Toshiko Kowada (Japan) Yasuko Konno	17	19	15
(England) Mary Wright (England) Karenza Matthews	9	21	21	21	21
(East Germany) Gabriele Geissler (East Germany) Doris Hovestädt	21	18	23	16	10
(Soviet Union) Svetlana Grinberg (Soviet Union) Zoja Rudnova	21	21	21
(Bulgaria) Emilia Neykova (Bulgaria) Albertina Rangelova	13	15	14

Quarterfinals
(Japan) Morisawa (Japan) Hirota	16	21	18	18
(Romania) Alexandru (Romania) Mihalca	21	15	21	21
(Hungary) Jurik (Hungary) Kisházi	22	15	16	12
(Czechoslovakia) Voštová (Czechoslovakia) Karlíková	20	21	21	21
(South Korea) Choi Hwan-hwan (South Korea) Choi Jung-sook	21	21	21
(Soviet Union) Gedraitite (East Germany) Stephan	11	12	15
(England) Wright (England) Matthews	19	18	19
(Soviet Union) Grinberg (Soviet Union) Rudnova	21	21	21

Semifinals
(Romania) Alexandru (Romania) Mihalca	21	18	21	21
(Czechoslovakia) Voštová (Czechoslovakia) Karlíková	17	21	17	15
(South Korea) Choi Hwan-hwan (South Korea) Choi Jung-sook	21	26	21	19	17
(Soviet Union) Rudnova (Soviet Union) Grinberg	15	28	19	21	21

Final
(Romania) Alexandru (Romania) Mihalca	21	17	15	21	14
(Soviet Union) Rudnova (Soviet Union) Grinberg	17	21	21	16	21

== See also ==
- List of World Table Tennis Championships medalists
