= 1969 World Table Tennis Championships =

1969 edition of the World Table Tennis Championships

The 1969 World Table Tennis Championships were held in Munich from April 17 to April 27, 1969, marking the 30th edition of the contest.

During the Cultural Revolution, Chinese sports professionals were denounced as 'Sprouts of Revisionism' and were denied places at the 1967 World Table Tennis Championships and 1969 World Table Tennis Championships. Players such as Jung Kuo-tuan were persecuted and he committed suicide in 1968. Had China competed in both championships and not lost the impetus gained in the previous decade they would surely have dominated the World Championships.

== Medalists ==
=== Team ===
Event	Gold	Silver	Bronze
Swaythling Cup; Men's Team	Japan; Nobuhiko Hasegawa; Tetsuo Inoue; Shigeo Itoh; Kenji Kasai; Mitsuru Kono	West Germany; Bernt Jansen; Wilfried Lieck; Martin Ness; Eberhard Schöler	Yugoslavia; Zlatko Cordas; Istvan Korpa; Antun Stipančić; Dragutin Šurbek; Edvard Vecko
Corbillon Cup; Women's team	Soviet Union; Laima Amelina; Svetlana Grinberg; Rita Pogosova; Zoja Rudnova	Romania; Maria Alexandru; Carmen Crișan; Eleonora Mihalca	Japan; Saeko Hirota; Yasuko Konno; Toshiko Kowada; Sachiko Morisawa

=== Individual ===
Event	Gold	Silver	Bronze
Men's singles	(Japan) Shigeo Itoh	(West Germany) Eberhard Schöler	(Japan) Kenji Kasai
Men's singles	(Japan) Shigeo Itoh	(West Germany) Eberhard Schöler	(Japan) Tokio Tasaka
Women's singles	(Japan) Toshiko Kowada	(East Germany) Gabriele Geissler	(Romania) Maria Alexandru
Women's singles	(Japan) Toshiko Kowada	(East Germany) Gabriele Geissler	(Japan) Miho Hamada
Men's doubles	(Sweden) Hans Alsér (Sweden) Kjell Johansson	(Japan) Nobuhiko Hasegawa (Japan) Tokio Tasaka	(Japan) Shigeo Itoh (Japan) Mitsuru Kono
Men's doubles	(Sweden) Hans Alsér (Sweden) Kjell Johansson	(Japan) Nobuhiko Hasegawa (Japan) Tokio Tasaka	(Soviet Union) Anatoly Amelin (Soviet Union) Stanislav Gomozkov
Women's doubles	(Soviet Union) Svetlana Grinberg (Soviet Union) Zoja Rudnova	(Romania) Maria Alexandru (Romania) Eleonora Mihalca	(South Korea) Choi Hwan-Hwan (South Korea) Choi Jung-Sook
Women's doubles	(Soviet Union) Svetlana Grinberg (Soviet Union) Zoja Rudnova	(Romania) Maria Alexandru (Romania) Eleonora Mihalca	(Czechoslovakia) Jitka Karlíková (Czechoslovakia) Ilona Voštová
Mixed doubles	(Japan) Nobuhiko Hasegawa (Japan) Yasuko Konno	(Japan) Mitsuru Kono (Japan) Saeko Hirota	(Japan) Shigeo Itoh (Japan) Toshiko Kowada
Mixed doubles	(Japan) Nobuhiko Hasegawa (Japan) Yasuko Konno	(Japan) Mitsuru Kono (Japan) Saeko Hirota	(England) Denis Neale (England) Mary Shannon-Wright
