= List of European Table Tennis Championships medalists =

The following is the List of European Table Tennis Championships medalists.

== Results of Individual Events ==
The tables below are European Table Tennis Champions lists of individual events (Men's and Women's Singles, Men's and Women's Doubles and Mixed).

=== Men's singles ===
Year	Host City	Gold	Silver	Bronze
1958	Budapest	(Hungary) Zoltán Berczik	(Hungary) Elemér Gyetvai	(Socialist Federal Republic of Yugoslavia) Vilim Harangozo
1958	Budapest	(Hungary) Zoltán Berczik	(Hungary) Elemér Gyetvai	(Czechoslovakia) Ludvík Vyhnanovský
1960	Zagreb	(Hungary) Zoltán Berczik	(Romania) Radu Negulescu	(Hungary) László Földy
1960	Zagreb	(Hungary) Zoltán Berczik	(Romania) Radu Negulescu	(West Germany) Konrad Freundorfer
1962	Berlin	(Sweden) Hans Alsér	(West Germany) Erich Arndt	(Sweden) Björne Mellström
1962	Berlin	(Sweden) Hans Alsér	(West Germany) Erich Arndt	(West Germany) Eberhard Schöler
1964	Malmö	(Sweden) Kjell Johansson	(Hungary) Zoltán Berczik	(West Germany) Eberhard Schöler
1964	Malmö	(Sweden) Kjell Johansson	(Hungary) Zoltán Berczik	(Czechoslovakia) Jaroslav Staněk
1966	London	(Sweden) Kjell Johansson	(Czechoslovakia) Vladimír Miko	(Soviet Union) Anatoly Amelin
1966	London	(Sweden) Kjell Johansson	(Czechoslovakia) Vladimír Miko	(Czechoslovakia) Štefan Kollárovits
1968	Lyon	(Socialist Federal Republic of Yugoslavia) Dragutin Šurbek	(Hungary) János Börzsei	(Sweden) Hans Alsér
1968	Lyon	(Socialist Federal Republic of Yugoslavia) Dragutin Šurbek	(Hungary) János Börzsei	(Sweden) Kjell Johansson
1970	Moscow	(Sweden) Hans Alsér	(Socialist Federal Republic of Yugoslavia) Istvan Korpa	(Sweden) Stellan Bengtsson
1970	Moscow	(Sweden) Hans Alsér	(Socialist Federal Republic of Yugoslavia) Istvan Korpa	(Sweden) Kjell Johansson
1972	Rotterdam	(Sweden) Stellan Bengtsson	(Hungary) István Jónyer	(Socialist Federal Republic of Yugoslavia) Istvan Korpa
1972	Rotterdam	(Sweden) Stellan Bengtsson	(Hungary) István Jónyer	(Socialist Federal Republic of Yugoslavia) Antun Stipančić
1974	Novi Sad	(Czechoslovakia) Milan Orlowski	(Hungary) Gábor Gergely	(Sweden) Kjell Johansson
1974	Novi Sad	(Czechoslovakia) Milan Orlowski	(Hungary) Gábor Gergely	(Socialist Federal Republic of Yugoslavia) Dragutin Šurbek
1976	Prague	(France) Jacques Secrétin	(Soviet Union) Anatoli Strokatov	(France) Christian Martin
1976	Prague	(France) Jacques Secrétin	(Soviet Union) Anatoli Strokatov	(Czechoslovakia) Milan Orlowski
1978	Duisburg	(Hungary) Gábor Gergely	(Hungary) István Jónyer	(England) Desmond Douglas
1978	Duisburg	(Hungary) Gábor Gergely	(Hungary) István Jónyer	(Hungary) Tibor Kreisz
1980	Bern	(England) John Hilton	(Czechoslovakia) Josef Dvořáček	(Sweden) Stellan Bengtsson
1980	Bern	(England) John Hilton	(Czechoslovakia) Josef Dvořáček	(France) Jacques Secrétin
1982	Budapest	(Sweden) Mikael Appelgren	(Sweden) Jan-Ove Waldner	(Hungary) Gábor Gergely
1982	Budapest	(Sweden) Mikael Appelgren	(Sweden) Jan-Ove Waldner	(Hungary) Tibor Klampár
1984	Moscow	(Sweden) Ulf Bengtsson	(Poland) Andrzej Grubba	(Soviet Union) Andrei Mazunov
1984	Moscow	(Sweden) Ulf Bengtsson	(Poland) Andrzej Grubba	(Socialist Federal Republic of Yugoslavia) Dragutin Šurbek
1986	Prague	(Sweden) Jörgen Persson	(Poland) Leszek Kucharski	(Sweden) Ulf Carlsson
1986	Prague	(Sweden) Jörgen Persson	(Poland) Leszek Kucharski	(Poland) Andrzej Grubba
1988	Paris	(Sweden) Mikael Appelgren	(Soviet Union) Andrei Mazunov	(West Germany) Jörg Roßkopf
1988	Paris	(Sweden) Mikael Appelgren	(Soviet Union) Andrei Mazunov	(Sweden) Jan-Ove Waldner
1990	Gothenburg	(Sweden) Mikael Appelgren	(Poland) Andrzej Grubba	(France) Jean-Philippe Gatien
1990	Gothenburg	(Sweden) Mikael Appelgren	(Poland) Andrzej Grubba	(West Germany) Jörg Roßkopf
1992	Stuttgart	(Germany) Jörg Roßkopf	(Belgium) Jean-Michel Saive	(Poland) Andrzej Grubba
1992	Stuttgart	(Germany) Jörg Roßkopf	(Belgium) Jean-Michel Saive	(Croatia) Zoran Primorac
1994	Birmingham	(Belgium) Jean-Michel Saive	(Sweden) Jan-Ove Waldner	(France) Patrick Chila
1994	Birmingham	(Belgium) Jean-Michel Saive	(Sweden) Jan-Ove Waldner	(Croatia) Zoran Primorac
1996	Bratislava	(Sweden) Jan-Ove Waldner	(Sweden) Jörgen Persson	(France) Jean-Philippe Gatien
1996	Bratislava	(Sweden) Jan-Ove Waldner	(Sweden) Jörgen Persson	(Sweden) Peter Karlsson
1998	Eindhoven	(Belarus) Vladimir Samsonov	(Croatia) Zoran Primorac	(France) Jean-Philippe Gatien
1998	Eindhoven	(Belarus) Vladimir Samsonov	(Croatia) Zoran Primorac	(Netherlands) Trinko Keen
2000	Bremen	(Sweden) Peter Karlsson	(Croatia) Zoran Primorac	(Czech Republic) Petr Korbel
2000	Bremen	(Sweden) Peter Karlsson	(Croatia) Zoran Primorac	(Sweden) Jan-Ove Waldner
2002	Zagreb	(Germany) Timo Boll	(Greece) Kalinikos Kreanga	(Croatia) Zoran Primorac
2002	Zagreb	(Germany) Timo Boll	(Greece) Kalinikos Kreanga	(Austria) Werner Schlager
2003	Courmayeur	(Belarus) Vladimir Samsonov	(Germany) Torben Wosik	(Germany) Timo Boll
2003	Courmayeur	(Belarus) Vladimir Samsonov	(Germany) Torben Wosik	(Germany) Jörg Roßkopf
2005	Aarhus	(Belarus) Vladimir Samsonov	(Belgium) Jean-Michel Saive	(Greece) Kalinikos Kreanga
2005	Aarhus	(Belarus) Vladimir Samsonov	(Belgium) Jean-Michel Saive	(Croatia) Zoran Primorac
2007	Belgrade	(Germany) Timo Boll	(Belarus) Vladimir Samsonov	(Denmark) Michael Maze
2007	Belgrade	(Germany) Timo Boll	(Belarus) Vladimir Samsonov	(Germany) Dimitrij Ovtcharov
2008	Saint Petersburg	(Germany) Timo Boll	(Belarus) Vladimir Samsonov	(Austria) Robert Gardos
2008	Saint Petersburg	(Germany) Timo Boll	(Belarus) Vladimir Samsonov	(Austria) Werner Schlager
2009	Stuttgart	(Denmark) Michael Maze	(Austria) Werner Schlager	(Germany) Timo Boll
2009	Stuttgart	(Denmark) Michael Maze	(Austria) Werner Schlager	(Russia) Fedor Kuzmin
2010	Ostrava	(Germany) Timo Boll	(Germany) Patrick Baum	(Austria) Werner Schlager
2010	Ostrava	(Germany) Timo Boll	(Germany) Patrick Baum	(Germany) Christian Süß
2011	Gdańsk	(Germany) Timo Boll	(Germany) Patrick Baum	(Serbia) Aleksandar Karakašević
2011	Gdańsk	(Germany) Timo Boll	(Germany) Patrick Baum	(Slovenia) Bojan Tokić
2012	Herning	(Germany) Timo Boll	(Croatia) Tan Ruiwu	(Romania) Adrian Crișan
2012	Herning	(Germany) Timo Boll	(Croatia) Tan Ruiwu	(Germany) Bastian Steger
2013	Schwechat	(Germany) Dimitrij Ovtcharov	(Belarus) Vladimir Samsonov	(Greece) Panagiotis Gionis
2013	Schwechat	(Germany) Dimitrij Ovtcharov	(Belarus) Vladimir Samsonov	(Germany) Bastian Steger
2015	Yekaterinburg	(Germany) Dimitrij Ovtcharov	(Portugal) Marcos Freitas	(Portugal) Tiago Apolónia
2015	Yekaterinburg	(Germany) Dimitrij Ovtcharov	(Portugal) Marcos Freitas	(Sweden) Pär Gerell
2016	Budapest	(France) Emmanuel Lebesson	(France) Simon Gauzy	(Germany) Timo Boll
2016	Budapest	(France) Emmanuel Lebesson	(France) Simon Gauzy	(Poland) Jakub Dyjas
2018	Alicante	(Germany) Timo Boll	(Romania) Ovidiu Ionescu	(Germany) Patrick Franziska
2018	Alicante	(Germany) Timo Boll	(Romania) Ovidiu Ionescu	(Sweden) Kristian Karlsson
2020	Warsaw	(Germany) Timo Boll	(Germany) Dimitrij Ovtcharov	(Sweden) Mattias Falck
2020	Warsaw	(Germany) Timo Boll	(Germany) Dimitrij Ovtcharov	(Portugal) Marcos Freitas
2022	Munich	(Germany) Dang Qiu	(Slovenia) Darko Jorgić	(Sweden) Mattias Falck
2022	Munich	(Germany) Dang Qiu	(Slovenia) Darko Jorgić	(Sweden) Kristian Karlsson
2024	Linz	(France) Alexis Lebrun	(Germany) Benedikt Duda	(Germany) Dimitrij Ovtcharov
2024	Linz	(France) Alexis Lebrun	(Germany) Benedikt Duda	(Sweden) Truls Möregårdh

=== Women's singles ===
Year	Host City	Gold	Silver	Bronze
1958	Budapest	(Hungary) Éva Kóczián	(England) Ann Haydon	(Hungary) Lívia Mossóczy
1958	Budapest	(Hungary) Éva Kóczián	(England) Ann Haydon	(Romania) Angelica Rozeanu
1960	Zagreb	(Hungary) Éva Kóczián	(Hungary) Ilona Kerekes	(Hungary) Sarolta Mathe
1960	Zagreb	(Hungary) Éva Kóczián	(Hungary) Ilona Kerekes	(England) Diane Rowe
1962	Berlin	(West Germany) Agnes Simon	(England) Diane Rowe	(West Germany) Inge Harst-Muser
1962	Berlin	(West Germany) Agnes Simon	(England) Diane Rowe	(West Germany) Uschi Matthias-Firdler
1964	Malmö	(Hungary) Éva Kóczián-Földy	(Hungary) Erzsebet Jurik	(Soviet Union) Svetlana Grinberg
1964	Malmö	(Hungary) Éva Kóczián-Földy	(Hungary) Erzsebet Jurik	(Soviet Union) Zoja Rudnova
1966	London	(Romania) Maria Alexandru	(Soviet Union) Svetlana Grinberg	(Hungary) Éva Kóczián-Földy
1966	London	(Romania) Maria Alexandru	(Soviet Union) Svetlana Grinberg	(Czechoslovakia) Marta Lužová
1968	Lyon	(Czechoslovakia) Ilona Voštová	(Soviet Union) Zoja Rudnova	(Soviet Union) Svetlana Grinberg
1968	Lyon	(Czechoslovakia) Ilona Voštová	(Soviet Union) Zoja Rudnova	(England) Mary Wright
1970	Moscow	(Soviet Union) Zoja Rudnova	(Czechoslovakia) Ilona Voštová	(Romania) Maria Alexandru
1970	Moscow	(Soviet Union) Zoja Rudnova	(Czechoslovakia) Ilona Voštová	(Soviet Union) Rita Pogosova
1972	Rotterdam	(Soviet Union) Zoja Rudnova	(Hungary) Beatrix Kisházi	(Romania) Maria Alexandru
1972	Rotterdam	(Soviet Union) Zoja Rudnova	(Hungary) Beatrix Kisházi	(Czechoslovakia) Ilona Voštová
1974	Novi Sad	(Hungary) Judit Magos-Havas	(Sweden) Ann-Christin Hellman	(Soviet Union) Svetlana Fedorova
1974	Novi Sad	(Hungary) Judit Magos-Havas	(Sweden) Ann-Christin Hellman	(Soviet Union) Zoja Rudnova
1976	Prague	(England) Jill Hammersley	(Romania) Maria Alexandru	(Sweden) Ann-Christin Hellman
1976	Prague	(England) Jill Hammersley	(Romania) Maria Alexandru	(West Germany) Wiebke Hendriksen
1978	Duisburg	(Hungary) Judit Magos-Havas	(England) Jill Hammersley	(Sweden) Ann-Christin Hellman
1978	Duisburg	(Hungary) Judit Magos-Havas	(England) Jill Hammersley	(Hungary) Gabriella Szabó
1980	Bern	(Soviet Union) Valentina Popova	(Socialist Federal Republic of Yugoslavia) Gordana Perkučin	(Czechoslovakia) Ilona Uhlíková-Voštová
1980	Bern	(Soviet Union) Valentina Popova	(Socialist Federal Republic of Yugoslavia) Gordana Perkučin	(Netherlands) Bettine Vriesekoop
1982	Budapest	(Netherlands) Bettine Vriesekoop	(England) Jill Hammersley	(West Germany) Ursula Kamizuru
1982	Budapest	(Netherlands) Bettine Vriesekoop	(England) Jill Hammersley	(Soviet Union) Valentina Popova
1984	Moscow	(Soviet Union) Valentina Popova	(Soviet Union) Fliura Bulatova	(Czechoslovakia) Marie Hrachová
1984	Moscow	(Soviet Union) Valentina Popova	(Soviet Union) Fliura Bulatova	(Hungary) Gabriella Szabó
1986	Prague	(Hungary) Csilla Bátorfi	(Soviet Union) Fliura Bulatova	(Romania) Otilia Bădescu
1986	Prague	(Hungary) Csilla Bátorfi	(Soviet Union) Fliura Bulatova	(England) Lisa Bellinger
1988	Paris	(Soviet Union) Fliura Bulatova	(Romania) Otilia Bădescu	(Czechoslovakia) Renata Kasalová
1988	Paris	(Soviet Union) Fliura Bulatova	(Romania) Otilia Bădescu	(Soviet Union) Valentina Popova
1990	Gothenburg	(Bulgaria) Daniela Guergueltcheva	(Switzerland) Dai-Yong Tu	(Romania) Otilia Bădescu
1990	Gothenburg	(Bulgaria) Daniela Guergueltcheva	(Switzerland) Dai-Yong Tu	(Hungary) Gabriella Wirth
1992	Stuttgart	(Netherlands) Bettine Vriesekoop	(England) Lisa Lomas	(Czechoslovakia) Marie Hrachová
1992	Stuttgart	(Netherlands) Bettine Vriesekoop	(England) Lisa Lomas	(Netherlands) Mirjam Hooman-Kloppenburg
1994	Birmingham	(Sweden) Marie Svensson	(Netherlands) Gerdie Keen	(Germany) Jie Schöpp
1994	Birmingham	(Sweden) Marie Svensson	(Netherlands) Gerdie Keen	(Germany) Nicole Struse
1996	Bratislava	(Germany) Nicole Struse	(Hungary) Krisztina Tóth	(Germany) Elke Schall
1996	Bratislava	(Germany) Nicole Struse	(Hungary) Krisztina Tóth	(Germany) Jie Schöpp
1998	Eindhoven	(Luxembourg) Ni Xialian	(Croatia) Tamara Boroš	(Germany) Nicole Struse
1998	Eindhoven	(Luxembourg) Ni Xialian	(Croatia) Tamara Boroš	(Hungary) Krisztina Tóth
2000	Bremen	(Germany) Qianhong Gotsch	(Romania) Mihaela Steff	(Croatia) Tamara Boroš
2000	Bremen	(Germany) Qianhong Gotsch	(Romania) Mihaela Steff	(Germany) Jie Schöpp
2002	Zagreb	(Luxembourg) Ni Xialian	(Hungary) Krisztina Tóth	(Hungary) Csilla Bátorfi
2002	Zagreb	(Luxembourg) Ni Xialian	(Hungary) Krisztina Tóth	(Croatia) Tamara Boroš
2003	Courmayeur	(Romania) Otilia Bădescu	(Italy) Wenling Tan Monfardini	(Serbia and Montenegro) Silvija Erdelji
2003	Courmayeur	(Romania) Otilia Bădescu	(Italy) Wenling Tan Monfardini	(Bulgaria) Nikoleta Stefanova
2005	Aarhus	(Austria) Liu Jia	(Romania) Mihaela Steff	(Croatia) Tamara Boroš
2005	Aarhus	(Austria) Liu Jia	(Romania) Mihaela Steff	(Netherlands) Li Jiao
2007	Belgrade	(Netherlands) Li Jiao	(Luxembourg) Ni Xialian	(Russia) Irina Kotikhina
2007	Belgrade	(Netherlands) Li Jiao	(Luxembourg) Ni Xialian	(Belarus) Viktoria Pavlovich
2008	Saint Petersburg	(Lithuania) Rūta Paškauskienė	(Austria) Liu Jia	(Italy) Wenling Tan Monfardini
2008	Saint Petersburg	(Lithuania) Rūta Paškauskienė	(Austria) Liu Jia	(Hungary) Krisztina Tóth
2009	Stuttgart	(Germany) Wu Jiaduo	(Ukraine) Margaryta Pesotska	(Lithuania) Rūta Paškauskienė
2009	Stuttgart	(Germany) Wu Jiaduo	(Ukraine) Margaryta Pesotska	(Belarus) Viktoria Pavlovich
2010	Ostrava	(Belarus) Viktoria Pavlovich	(Austria) Liu Jia	(Turkey) Melek Hu
2010	Ostrava	(Belarus) Viktoria Pavlovich	(Austria) Liu Jia	(Lithuania) Rūta Paškauskienė
2011	Gdańsk	(Netherlands) Li Jiao	(Germany) Irene Ivancan	(Poland) Li Qian
2011	Gdańsk	(Netherlands) Li Jiao	(Germany) Irene Ivancan	(Ukraine) Margaryta Pesotska
2012	Herning	(Belarus) Viktoria Pavlovich	(France) Xian Yi Fang	(France) Li Xue
2012	Herning	(Belarus) Viktoria Pavlovich	(France) Xian Yi Fang	(Austria) Liu Jia
2013	Schwechat	(Sweden) Li Fen	(Germany) Shan Xiaona	(Portugal) Fu Yu
2013	Schwechat	(Sweden) Li Fen	(Germany) Shan Xiaona	(Germany) Han Ying
2015	Yekaterinburg	(Romania) Elizabeta Samara	(Netherlands) Li Jie	(Portugal) Fu Yu
2015	Yekaterinburg	(Romania) Elizabeta Samara	(Netherlands) Li Jie	(Russia) Polina Mikhaylova
2016	Budapest	(Turkey) Melek Hu	(Portugal) Fu Yu	(Netherlands) Li Jie
2016	Budapest	(Turkey) Melek Hu	(Portugal) Fu Yu	(Romania) Elizabeta Samara
2018	Alicante	(Poland) Li Qian	(Ukraine) Margaryta Pesotska	(Poland) Katarzyna Grzybowska-Franc
2018	Alicante	(Poland) Li Qian	(Ukraine) Margaryta Pesotska	(Austria) Sofia Polcanova
2020	Warsaw	(Germany) Petrissa Solja	(Germany) Shan Xiaona	(Ukraine) Margaryta Pesotska
2020	Warsaw	(Germany) Petrissa Solja	(Germany) Shan Xiaona	(Romania) Elizabeta Samara
2022	Munich	(Austria) Sofia Polcanova	(Germany) Nina Mittelham	(Germany) Shan Xiaona
2022	Munich	(Austria) Sofia Polcanova	(Germany) Nina Mittelham	(Germany) Sabine Winter
2024	Linz	(Austria) Sofia Polcanova	(Romania) Bernadette Szőcs	(Spain) María Xiao
2024	Linz	(Austria) Sofia Polcanova	(Romania) Bernadette Szőcs	(Germany) Nina Mittelham

=== Men's doubles ===
Year	Host City	Gold	Silver	Bronze
1958	Budapest	(Czechoslovakia) Ladislav Štípek (Czechoslovakia) Ludvík Vyhnanovský	(Romania) Otto Bottner (Romania) Toma Reiter	(Romania) Matei Gantner (Romania) Tiberiu Harasztosi
1958	Budapest	(Czechoslovakia) Ladislav Štípek (Czechoslovakia) Ludvík Vyhnanovský	(Romania) Otto Bottner (Romania) Toma Reiter	(West Germany) Helmut Hanschmann (West Germany) Heinz Haupt
1960	Zagreb	(Hungary) Zoltán Berczik (Hungary) Ferenc Sidó	(Soviet Union) Rimas Paskevicius (Soviet Union) Alguimantas Saunoris	(Belgium) Walter Dugardin (Belgium) Georges Roland
1960	Zagreb	(Hungary) Zoltán Berczik (Hungary) Ferenc Sidó	(Soviet Union) Rimas Paskevicius (Soviet Union) Alguimantas Saunoris	(Sweden) Tony Larsson (Socialist Federal Republic of Yugoslavia) Josip Vogrinc
1962	Berlin	(Socialist Federal Republic of Yugoslavia) Vojislav Marković (Socialist Federal Republic of Yugoslavia) Janez Teran	(Socialist Federal Republic of Yugoslavia) Istvan Korpa (Socialist Federal Republic of Yugoslavia) Edvard Vecko	(West Germany) Dieter Forster (West Germany) Eberhard Schöler
1962	Berlin	(Socialist Federal Republic of Yugoslavia) Vojislav Marković (Socialist Federal Republic of Yugoslavia) Janez Teran	(Socialist Federal Republic of Yugoslavia) Istvan Korpa (Socialist Federal Republic of Yugoslavia) Edvard Vecko	(Austria) Hans Jell (Austria) Karl Wegrath
1964	Malmö	(Czechoslovakia) Vladimír Miko (Czechoslovakia) Jaroslav Staněk	(Sweden) Hans Alsér (Sweden) Kjell Johansson	(Hungary) Zoltán Berczik (Hungary) Péter Rózsás
1964	Malmö	(Czechoslovakia) Vladimír Miko (Czechoslovakia) Jaroslav Staněk	(Sweden) Hans Alsér (Sweden) Kjell Johansson	(Hungary) János Faházi (Hungary) Laszlo Pignitsky
1966	London	(Sweden) Hans Alsér (Sweden) Kjell Johansson	(Czechoslovakia) Vladimír Miko (Czechoslovakia) Jaroslav Staněk	(Soviet Union) Anatoly Amelin (Soviet Union) Stanislav Gomozkov
1966	London	(Sweden) Hans Alsér (Sweden) Kjell Johansson	(Czechoslovakia) Vladimír Miko (Czechoslovakia) Jaroslav Staněk	(Socialist Federal Republic of Yugoslavia) Istvan Korpa (Socialist Federal Republic of Yugoslavia) Edvard Vecko
1968	Lyon	(Socialist Federal Republic of Yugoslavia) Antun Stipančić (Socialist Federal Republic of Yugoslavia) Edvard Vecko	(Sweden) Hans Alsér (Sweden) Kjell Johansson	(Soviet Union) Anatoly Amelin (Soviet Union) Stanislav Gomozkov
1968	Lyon	(Socialist Federal Republic of Yugoslavia) Antun Stipančić (Socialist Federal Republic of Yugoslavia) Edvard Vecko	(Sweden) Hans Alsér (Sweden) Kjell Johansson	(Hungary) Matyas Beleznai (Hungary) István Jónyer
1970	Moscow	(Socialist Federal Republic of Yugoslavia) Antun Stipančić (Socialist Federal Republic of Yugoslavia) Dragutin Šurbek	(Sweden) Hans Alsér (Sweden) Kjell Johansson	(Soviet Union) Anatoly Amelin (Soviet Union) Stanislav Gomozkov
1970	Moscow	(Socialist Federal Republic of Yugoslavia) Antun Stipančić (Socialist Federal Republic of Yugoslavia) Dragutin Šurbek	(Sweden) Hans Alsér (Sweden) Kjell Johansson	(Hungary) István Jónyer (Hungary) Tibor Klampár
1972	Rotterdam	(Hungary) István Jónyer (Hungary) Péter Rózsás	(Sweden) Stellan Bengtsson (Sweden) Kjell Johansson	(Hungary) János Börzsei (West Germany) Eberhard Schöler
1972	Rotterdam	(Hungary) István Jónyer (Hungary) Péter Rózsás	(Sweden) Stellan Bengtsson (Sweden) Kjell Johansson	(Czechoslovakia) Milan Orlowski (Czechoslovakia) Jiri Turai
1974	Novi Sad	(Hungary) István Jónyer (Hungary) Tibor Klampár	(Sweden) Stellan Bengtsson (Sweden) Kjell Johansson	(Soviet Union) Stanislav Gomozkov (Soviet Union) Sarkis Sarkhojan
1974	Novi Sad	(Hungary) István Jónyer (Hungary) Tibor Klampár	(Sweden) Stellan Bengtsson (Sweden) Kjell Johansson	(Socialist Federal Republic of Yugoslavia) Antun Stipančić (Socialist Federal Republic of Yugoslavia) Dragutin Šurbek
1976	Prague	(Sweden) Stellan Bengtsson (Sweden) Kjell Johansson	(Czechoslovakia) Jaroslav Kunz (Czechoslovakia) Milan Orlowski	(Hungary) Bela Frank (Sweden) Ingemar Wikström
1976	Prague	(Sweden) Stellan Bengtsson (Sweden) Kjell Johansson	(Czechoslovakia) Jaroslav Kunz (Czechoslovakia) Milan Orlowski	(Socialist Federal Republic of Yugoslavia) Antun Stipančić (Socialist Federal Republic of Yugoslavia) Dragutin Šurbek
1978	Duisburg	(Hungary) Gábor Gergely (Czechoslovakia) Milan Orlowski	(West Germany) Jochen Leiss (West Germany) Peter Stellwag	(Socialist Federal Republic of Yugoslavia) Milivoj Karakašević (Socialist Federal Republic of Yugoslavia) Zoran Kosanović
1978	Duisburg	(Hungary) Gábor Gergely (Czechoslovakia) Milan Orlowski	(West Germany) Jochen Leiss (West Germany) Peter Stellwag	(Socialist Federal Republic of Yugoslavia) Antun Stipančić (Socialist Federal Republic of Yugoslavia) Dragutin Šurbek
1980	Bern	(France) Patrick Birocheau (France) Jacques Secrétin	(Socialist Federal Republic of Yugoslavia) Antun Stipančić (Socialist Federal Republic of Yugoslavia) Dragutin Šurbek	(Hungary) Gábor Gergely (Czechoslovakia) Milan Orlowski
1980	Bern	(France) Patrick Birocheau (France) Jacques Secrétin	(Socialist Federal Republic of Yugoslavia) Antun Stipančić (Socialist Federal Republic of Yugoslavia) Dragutin Šurbek	(Hungary) István Jónyer (Hungary) Tibor Klampár
1982	Budapest	(Socialist Federal Republic of Yugoslavia) Zoran Kalinić (Socialist Federal Republic of Yugoslavia) Dragutin Šurbek	(Hungary) Gábor Gergely (Hungary) István Jónyer	(Sweden) Ulf Bengtsson (Sweden) Erik Lindh
1982	Budapest	(Socialist Federal Republic of Yugoslavia) Zoran Kalinić (Socialist Federal Republic of Yugoslavia) Dragutin Šurbek	(Hungary) Gábor Gergely (Hungary) István Jónyer	(France) Patrick Birocheau (France) Jacques Secrétin
1984	Moscow	(Socialist Federal Republic of Yugoslavia) Zoran Kalinić (Socialist Federal Republic of Yugoslavia) Dragutin Šurbek	(Sweden) Erik Lindh (Sweden) Jan-Ove Waldner	(Sweden) Ulf Bengtsson (Sweden) Ulf Carlsson
1984	Moscow	(Socialist Federal Republic of Yugoslavia) Zoran Kalinić (Socialist Federal Republic of Yugoslavia) Dragutin Šurbek	(Sweden) Erik Lindh (Sweden) Jan-Ove Waldner	(France) Patrick Birocheau (France) Jacques Secrétin
1986	Prague	(Sweden) Erik Lindh (Sweden) Jan-Ove Waldner	(Sweden) Mikael Appelgren (Sweden) Ulf Carlsson	(Socialist Federal Republic of Yugoslavia) Zoran Kalinić (Socialist Federal Republic of Yugoslavia) Dragutin Šurbek
1986	Prague	(Sweden) Erik Lindh (Sweden) Jan-Ove Waldner	(Sweden) Mikael Appelgren (Sweden) Ulf Carlsson	(Socialist Federal Republic of Yugoslavia) Ilija Lupulesku (Socialist Federal Republic of Yugoslavia) Zoran Primorac
1988	Paris	(Sweden) Mikael Appelgren (Sweden) Jan-Ove Waldner	(Socialist Federal Republic of Yugoslavia) Ilija Lupulesku (Socialist Federal Republic of Yugoslavia) Zoran Primorac	(Poland) Andrzej Grubba (Poland) Leszek Kucharski
1988	Paris	(Sweden) Mikael Appelgren (Sweden) Jan-Ove Waldner	(Socialist Federal Republic of Yugoslavia) Ilija Lupulesku (Socialist Federal Republic of Yugoslavia) Zoran Primorac	(Sweden) Erik Lindh (Sweden) Jörgen Persson
1990	Gothenburg	(Socialist Federal Republic of Yugoslavia) Ilija Lupulesku (Socialist Federal Republic of Yugoslavia) Zoran Primorac	(West Germany) Steffen Fetzner (West Germany) Jörg Roßkopf	(Sweden) Peter Karlsson (Sweden) Thomas von Scheele
1990	Gothenburg	(Socialist Federal Republic of Yugoslavia) Ilija Lupulesku (Socialist Federal Republic of Yugoslavia) Zoran Primorac	(West Germany) Steffen Fetzner (West Germany) Jörg Roßkopf	(Soviet Union) Andrei Mazunov (Soviet Union) Dmitry Mazunov
1992	Stuttgart	(Sweden) Erik Lindh (Sweden) Jörgen Persson	(Sweden) Mikael Appelgren (Sweden) Jan-Ove Waldner	(Socialist Federal Republic of Yugoslavia) Slobodan Grujić (Socialist Federal Republic of Yugoslavia) Ilija Lupulesku
1992	Stuttgart	(Sweden) Erik Lindh (Sweden) Jörgen Persson	(Sweden) Mikael Appelgren (Sweden) Jan-Ove Waldner	(Sweden) Peter Karlsson (Sweden) Thomas von Scheele
1994	Birmingham	(Federal Republic of Yugoslavia) Zoran Kalinić (Greece) Kalinikos Kreanga	(Croatia) Zoran Primorac (Belgium) Jean-Michel Saive	(Germany) Christian Dreher (Belarus) Vladimir Samsonov
1994	Birmingham	(Federal Republic of Yugoslavia) Zoran Kalinić (Greece) Kalinikos Kreanga	(Croatia) Zoran Primorac (Belgium) Jean-Michel Saive	(Germany) Steffen Fetzner (Germany) Jörg Roßkopf
1996	Bratislava	(Sweden) Jörgen Persson (Sweden) Jan-Ove Waldner	(Poland) Lucjan Błaszczyk (Poland) Andrzej Grubba	(Germany) Steffen Fetzner (Germany) Jörg Roßkopf
1996	Bratislava	(Sweden) Jörgen Persson (Sweden) Jan-Ove Waldner	(Poland) Lucjan Błaszczyk (Poland) Andrzej Grubba	(Federal Republic of Yugoslavia) Zoran Kalinić (Greece) Kalinikos Kreanga
1998	Eindhoven	(Germany) Jörg Roßkopf (Belarus) Vladimir Samsonov	(Greece) Kalinikos Kreanga (Federal Republic of Yugoslavia) Ilija Lupulesku	(Austria) Karl Jindrak (Austria) Werner Schlager
1998	Eindhoven	(Germany) Jörg Roßkopf (Belarus) Vladimir Samsonov	(Greece) Kalinikos Kreanga (Federal Republic of Yugoslavia) Ilija Lupulesku	(Sweden) Jörgen Persson (Sweden) Jan-Ove Waldner
2000	Bremen	(France) Patrick Chila (France) Jean-Philippe Gatien	(Greece) Kalinikos Kreanga (Federal Republic of Yugoslavia) Ilija Lupulesku	(Germany) Lars Hielscher (Germany) Thomas Keinath
2000	Bremen	(France) Patrick Chila (France) Jean-Philippe Gatien	(Greece) Kalinikos Kreanga (Federal Republic of Yugoslavia) Ilija Lupulesku	(Austria) Karl Jindrak (Austria) Werner Schlager
2002	Zagreb	(Germany) Timo Boll (Germany) Zoltan Fejer-Konnerth	(Poland) Lucjan Błaszczyk (Poland) Tomasz Krzeszewski	(France) Patrick Chila (France) Damien Éloi
2002	Zagreb	(Germany) Timo Boll (Germany) Zoltan Fejer-Konnerth	(Poland) Lucjan Błaszczyk (Poland) Tomasz Krzeszewski	(Netherlands) Danny Heister (Netherlands) Trinko Keen
2003	Courmayeur	(Austria) Chen Weixing (Belarus) Evgueni Chtchetinine	(Russia) Dmitry Mazunov (Russia) Alexey Smirnov	(Serbia and Montenegro) Slobodan Grujić (Serbia and Montenegro) Aleksandar Karakašević
2003	Courmayeur	(Austria) Chen Weixing (Belarus) Evgueni Chtchetinine	(Russia) Dmitry Mazunov (Russia) Alexey Smirnov	(Austria) Karl Jindrak (Austria) Werner Schlager
2005	Aarhus	(Austria) Karl Jindrak (Austria) Werner Schlager	(Greece) Kalinikos Kreanga (Belarus) Vladimir Samsonov	(Germany) Timo Boll (Germany) Christian Süß
2005	Aarhus	(Austria) Karl Jindrak (Austria) Werner Schlager	(Greece) Kalinikos Kreanga (Belarus) Vladimir Samsonov	(Russia) Dmitry Mazunov (Russia) Alexey Smirnov
2007	Belgrade	(Germany) Timo Boll (Germany) Christian Süß	(Poland) Lucjan Błaszczyk (Croatia) Tan Ruiwu	(France) Patrick Chila (Austria) Werner Schlager
2007	Belgrade	(Germany) Timo Boll (Germany) Christian Süß	(Poland) Lucjan Błaszczyk (Croatia) Tan Ruiwu	(Russia) Dmitry Mazunov (Russia) Alexey Smirnov
2008	Saint Petersburg	(Germany) Timo Boll (Germany) Christian Süß	(Netherlands) Trinko Keen (Austria) Werner Schlager	(Portugal) Tiago Apolónia (Portugal) Marcos Freitas
2008	Saint Petersburg	(Germany) Timo Boll (Germany) Christian Süß	(Netherlands) Trinko Keen (Austria) Werner Schlager	(Sweden) Jon Persson (Sweden) Robert Svensson
2009	Stuttgart	(Germany) Timo Boll (Germany) Christian Süß	(Poland) Lucjan Błaszczyk (Poland) Wang Zengyi	(France) Damien Éloi (France) Emmanuel Lebesson
2009	Stuttgart	(Germany) Timo Boll (Germany) Christian Süß	(Poland) Lucjan Błaszczyk (Poland) Wang Zengyi	(Serbia) Aleksandar Karakašević (Slovenia) Bojan Tokić
2010	Ostrava	(Germany) Timo Boll (Germany) Christian Süß	(Denmark) Jonathan Groth (Denmark) Kasper Sternberg	(Sweden) Pär Gerell (Sweden) Jens Lundqvist
2010	Ostrava	(Germany) Timo Boll (Germany) Christian Süß	(Denmark) Jonathan Groth (Denmark) Kasper Sternberg	(Ukraine) Kou Lei (Ukraine) Yevhen Pryshchepa
2011	Gdańsk	(Portugal) Marcos Freitas (Croatia) Andrej Gaćina	(Russia) Alexander Shibaev (Russia) Kirill Skachkov	(Serbia) Aleksandar Karakašević (Slovenia) Bojan Tokić
2011	Gdańsk	(Portugal) Marcos Freitas (Croatia) Andrej Gaćina	(Russia) Alexander Shibaev (Russia) Kirill Skachkov	(Russia) Alexey Liventsov (Russia) Mikhail Paikov
2012	Herning	(Austria) Robert Gardos (Austria) Daniel Habesohn	(Sweden) Kristian Karlsson (Sweden) Mattias Karlsson	(Russia) Alexey Liventsov (Russia) Mikhail Palkov
2012	Herning	(Austria) Robert Gardos (Austria) Daniel Habesohn	(Sweden) Kristian Karlsson (Sweden) Mattias Karlsson	(Germany) Dimitrij Ovtcharov (Belarus) Vladimir Samsonov
2013	Schwechat	(Croatia) Tan Ruiwu (Poland) Wang Zengyi	(Austria) Robert Gardos (Austria) Daniel Habesohn	(Portugal) Tiago Apolónia (Portugal) João Monteiro
2013	Schwechat	(Croatia) Tan Ruiwu (Poland) Wang Zengyi	(Austria) Robert Gardos (Austria) Daniel Habesohn	(Spain) He Zhiwen (Spain) Carlos Machado
2015	Yekaterinburg	(Austria) Stefan Fegerl (Portugal) João Monteiro	(Austria) Robert Gardos (Austria) Daniel Habesohn	(Sweden) Kristian Karlsson (Sweden) Mattias Karlsson
2015	Yekaterinburg	(Austria) Stefan Fegerl (Portugal) João Monteiro	(Austria) Robert Gardos (Austria) Daniel Habesohn	(Russia) Alexander Shibaev (Russia) Kirill Skachkov
2016	Budapest	(Germany) Patrick Franziska (Denmark) Jonathan Groth	(Poland) Jakub Dyjas (Poland) Daniel Górak	(Portugal) Tiago Apolónia (Portugal) João Geraldo
2016	Budapest	(Germany) Patrick Franziska (Denmark) Jonathan Groth	(Poland) Jakub Dyjas (Poland) Daniel Górak	(Sweden) Kristian Karlsson (Sweden) Mattias Karlsson
2018	Alicante	(Austria) Robert Gardos (Austria) Daniel Habesohn	(Sweden) Mattias Falck (Sweden) Kristian Karlsson	(Germany) Ruwen Filus (Germany) Ricardo Walther
2018	Alicante	(Austria) Robert Gardos (Austria) Daniel Habesohn	(Sweden) Mattias Falck (Sweden) Kristian Karlsson	(Germany) Patrick Franziska (Denmark) Jonathan Groth
2020	Warsaw	(Russia) Maksim Grebnev (Russia) Lev Katsman	(Poland) Jakub Dyjas (Belgium) Cédric Nuytinck	(Portugal) Tiago Apolónia (Portugal) João Monteiro
2020	Warsaw	(Russia) Maksim Grebnev (Russia) Lev Katsman	(Poland) Jakub Dyjas (Belgium) Cédric Nuytinck	(Hungary) Nandor Ecseki (Hungary) Ádám Szudi
2022	Munich	(Sweden) Mattias Falck (Sweden) Kristian Karlsson	(Austria) Robert Gardos (Austria) Daniel Habesohn	(Sweden) Anton Källberg (Sweden) Jon Persson
2022	Munich	(Sweden) Mattias Falck (Sweden) Kristian Karlsson	(Austria) Robert Gardos (Austria) Daniel Habesohn	(France) Alexis Lebrun (France) Félix Lebrun
2024	Linz	(France) Alexis Lebrun (France) Félix Lebrun	(Sweden) Anton Källberg (Sweden) Truls Möregårdh	(Austria) Maciej Kolodziejczyk (Moldova) Vladislav Ursu
2024	Linz	(France) Alexis Lebrun (France) Félix Lebrun	(Sweden) Anton Källberg (Sweden) Truls Möregårdh	(Sweden) Mattias Falck (Sweden) Kristian Karlsson

=== Women's doubles ===
Year	Host City	Gold	Silver	Bronze
1958	Budapest	(Romania) Angelica Rozeanu (Romania) Ella Zeller	(Hungary) Éva Kóczián (Hungary) Lívia Mossóczy	(England) Ann Haydon (England) Diane Rowe
1958	Budapest	(Romania) Angelica Rozeanu (Romania) Ella Zeller	(Hungary) Éva Kóczián (Hungary) Lívia Mossóczy	(Hungary) Ilona Kerekes (Hungary) Gizella Lantos
1960	Zagreb	(Romania) Maria Alexandru (Romania) Angelica Rozeanu	(Hungary) Éva Kóczián (Hungary) Sarolta Mathe	(Hungary) Ilona Kerekes (Hungary) Gizella Lantos
1960	Zagreb	(Romania) Maria Alexandru (Romania) Angelica Rozeanu	(Hungary) Éva Kóczián (Hungary) Sarolta Mathe	(England) Diane Rowe (England) Kathleen Thompson
1962	Berlin	(England) Diane Rowe (England) Mary Shannon	(West Germany) Inge Harst-Muser (West Germany) Agnes Simon	(Sweden) Britt Andersson (Sweden) Birgitta Tegner
1962	Berlin	(England) Diane Rowe (England) Mary Shannon	(West Germany) Inge Harst-Muser (West Germany) Agnes Simon	(West Germany) Ilse Lantermann (West Germany) Oda Mielenhausen
1964	Malmö	(England) Diane Rowe (England) Mary Shannon	(Romania) Maria Alexandru (Romania) Ella Constantinescu	(Soviet Union) Svetlana Grinberg (Soviet Union) Dzintra Lukina
1964	Malmö	(England) Diane Rowe (England) Mary Shannon	(Romania) Maria Alexandru (Romania) Ella Constantinescu	(Hungary) Sarolta Lukacs (Hungary) Angela Papp
1966	London	(Hungary) Erzsebet Jurik (Hungary) Éva Kóczián	(Czechoslovakia) Marta Lužová (Czechoslovakia) Irena Mikocsiova	(West Germany) Edit Buchholz (West Germany) Agnes Simon
1966	London	(Hungary) Erzsebet Jurik (Hungary) Éva Kóczián	(Czechoslovakia) Marta Lužová (Czechoslovakia) Irena Mikocsiova	(England) Diane Schöler (England) Mary Wright
1968	Lyon	(Czechoslovakia) Jitka Karlíková (Czechoslovakia) Marta Lužová	(Soviet Union) Svetlana Grinberg (Soviet Union) Zoja Rudnova	(Romania) Maria Alexandru (Romania) Eleonora Mihalca
1968	Lyon	(Czechoslovakia) Jitka Karlíková (Czechoslovakia) Marta Lužová	(Soviet Union) Svetlana Grinberg (Soviet Union) Zoja Rudnova	(England) Karenza Smith (England) Mary Wright
1970	Moscow	(Soviet Union) Svetlana Grinberg (Soviet Union) Zoja Rudnova	(West Germany) Diane Schöler (West Germany) Agnes Simon	(Romania) Maria Alexandru (Romania) Carmen Crișan
1970	Moscow	(Soviet Union) Svetlana Grinberg (Soviet Union) Zoja Rudnova	(West Germany) Diane Schöler (West Germany) Agnes Simon	(Poland) Danuta Calinska (Poland) Czeslawa Noworyta
1972	Rotterdam	(Hungary) Judit Magos-Havas (Hungary) Henriette Lotaller	(England) Jill Hammersley (Hungary) Beatrix Kisházi	(Romania) Maria Alexandru (Romania) Carmen Crișan
1972	Rotterdam	(Hungary) Judit Magos-Havas (Hungary) Henriette Lotaller	(England) Jill Hammersley (Hungary) Beatrix Kisházi	(Soviet Union) Svetlana Fedorova (Soviet Union) Zoja Rudnova
1974	Novi Sad	(Hungary) Judit Magos-Havas (Hungary) Henriette Lotaller	(Romania) Maria Alexandru (Czechoslovakia) Alica Grofová	(Soviet Union) Asta Gedraitite (Soviet Union) Zoja Rudnova
1974	Novi Sad	(Hungary) Judit Magos-Havas (Hungary) Henriette Lotaller	(Romania) Maria Alexandru (Czechoslovakia) Alica Grofová	(Romania) Magalena Leszay (Romania) Eleonora Vlaicov
1976	Prague	(England) Jill Hammersley (England) Linda Howard	(Czechoslovakia) Dana Dubinova (Czechoslovakia) Alica Grofová	(France) Claude Bergeret (France) Brigitte Thiriet
1976	Prague	(England) Jill Hammersley (England) Linda Howard	(Czechoslovakia) Dana Dubinova (Czechoslovakia) Alica Grofová	(West Germany) Monika Kneip (West Germany) Agnes Simon
1978	Duisburg	(Romania) Maria Alexandru (Romania) Liana Mihut	(Hungary) Judit Magos-Havas (Hungary) Gabriella Szabó	(Soviet Union) Narine Antonjan (Soviet Union) Valentina Popova
1978	Duisburg	(Romania) Maria Alexandru (Romania) Liana Mihut	(Hungary) Judit Magos-Havas (Hungary) Gabriella Szabó	(Czechoslovakia) Blanka Silhanova (Czechoslovakia) Ilona Uhlíková-Voštová
1980	Bern	(Soviet Union) Narine Antonjan (Soviet Union) Valentina Popova	(Romania) Maria Alexandru (Romania) Liana Macean	(England) Jill Hammersley (England) Linda Jarvis
1980	Bern	(Soviet Union) Narine Antonjan (Soviet Union) Valentina Popova	(Romania) Maria Alexandru (Romania) Liana Macean	(Poland) Jolanta Saztko (Poland) Malgorzata Urbanska
1982	Budapest	(Soviet Union) Fliura Bulatova (Soviet Union) Inna Kovalenko	(Netherlands) Sandra De Kruiff (Netherlands) Bettine Vriesekoop	(England) Jill Hammersley (England) Linda Jarvis
1982	Budapest	(Soviet Union) Fliura Bulatova (Soviet Union) Inna Kovalenko	(Netherlands) Sandra De Kruiff (Netherlands) Bettine Vriesekoop	(Hungary) Judit Magos-Havas (Hungary) Gabriella Szabó
1984	Moscow	(Soviet Union) Narine Antonjan (Soviet Union) Valentina Popova	(Socialist Federal Republic of Yugoslavia) Branka Batinić (Socialist Federal Republic of Yugoslavia) Gordana Perkučin	(Czechoslovakia) Marie Hrachová (Netherlands) Bettine Vriesekoop
1984	Moscow	(Soviet Union) Narine Antonjan (Soviet Union) Valentina Popova	(Socialist Federal Republic of Yugoslavia) Branka Batinić (Socialist Federal Republic of Yugoslavia) Gordana Perkučin	(Hungary) Gabriella Szabó (Hungary) Edit Urban
1986	Prague	(Soviet Union) Fliura Bulatova (Soviet Union) Elena Kovtun	(Czechoslovakia) Marie Hrachová (Netherlands) Bettine Vriesekoop	(Romania) Maria Alboiu (Romania) Otilia Bădescu
1986	Prague	(Soviet Union) Fliura Bulatova (Soviet Union) Elena Kovtun	(Czechoslovakia) Marie Hrachová (Netherlands) Bettine Vriesekoop	(Sweden) Marie Svensson (Sweden) Barbro Wiktorsson
1988	Paris	(Hungary) Csilla Bátorfi (Hungary) Edit Urban	(Soviet Union) Fliura Bulatova (Soviet Union) Elena Kovtun	(Romania) Otilia Bădescu (Romania) Maria Lunescu
1988	Paris	(Hungary) Csilla Bátorfi (Hungary) Edit Urban	(Soviet Union) Fliura Bulatova (Soviet Union) Elena Kovtun	(Czechoslovakia) Marie Hrachová (Czechoslovakia) Renata Kasalová
1990	Gothenburg	(Hungary) Csilla Bátorfi (Hungary) Gabriella Wirth	(Soviet Union) Irina Palina (Soviet Union) Elena Timina	(France) Emmanuelle Coubat (France) Xiaoming Wang-Dréchou
1990	Gothenburg	(Hungary) Csilla Bátorfi (Hungary) Gabriella Wirth	(Soviet Union) Irina Palina (Soviet Union) Elena Timina	(Soviet Union) Galina Melnik (Soviet Union) Valentina Popova
1992	Stuttgart	(Socialist Federal Republic of Yugoslavia) Jasna Fazlić (Socialist Federal Republic of Yugoslavia) Gordana Perkučin	(Hungary) Csilla Bátorfi (Hungary) Gabriella Wirth	(Netherlands) Mirjam Hooman-Kloppenburg (Netherlands) Bettine Vriesekoop
1992	Stuttgart	(Socialist Federal Republic of Yugoslavia) Jasna Fazlić (Socialist Federal Republic of Yugoslavia) Gordana Perkučin	(Hungary) Csilla Bátorfi (Hungary) Gabriella Wirth	(Russia) Irina Palina (Russia) Elena Timina
1994	Birmingham	(Hungary) Csilla Bátorfi (Hungary) Krisztina Tóth	(Russia) Irina Palina (Russia) Elena Timina	(France) Anne Boileau (France) Sylvie Plaisant
1994	Birmingham	(Hungary) Csilla Bátorfi (Hungary) Krisztina Tóth	(Russia) Irina Palina (Russia) Elena Timina	(Lithuania) Rūta Garkauskaitė (Lithuania) Jolanta Prūsienė
1996	Bratislava	(Germany) Elke Schall (Germany) Nicole Struse	(Netherlands) Emily Noor (Netherlands) Bettine Vriesekoop	(Romania) Otilia Bădescu (Romania) Emilia Elena Ciosu
1996	Bratislava	(Germany) Elke Schall (Germany) Nicole Struse	(Netherlands) Emily Noor (Netherlands) Bettine Vriesekoop	(Lithuania) Rūta Garkauskaitė (Lithuania) Jolanta Prūsienė
1998	Eindhoven	(Germany) Elke Schall (Germany) Nicole Struse	(Romania) Otilia Bădescu (Sweden) Marie Svensson	(Croatia) Tamara Boroš (Romania) Mihaela Steff
1998	Eindhoven	(Germany) Elke Schall (Germany) Nicole Struse	(Romania) Otilia Bădescu (Sweden) Marie Svensson	(Sweden) Pernilla Pettersson (Sweden) Åsa Svensson
2000	Bremen	(Hungary) Csilla Bátorfi (Hungary) Krisztina Tóth	(Luxembourg) Ni Xialian (Luxembourg) Peggy Regenwetter	(Germany) Elke Schall (Germany) Nicole Struse
2000	Bremen	(Hungary) Csilla Bátorfi (Hungary) Krisztina Tóth	(Luxembourg) Ni Xialian (Luxembourg) Peggy Regenwetter	(Sweden) Åsa Svensson (Sweden) Marie Svensson
2002	Zagreb	(Croatia) Tamara Boroš (Romania) Mihaela Steff	(Belarus) Tatyana Kostromina (Belarus) Viktoria Pavlovich	(Lithuania) Rūta Būdienė (Lithuania) Jolanta Prūsienė
2002	Zagreb	(Croatia) Tamara Boroš (Romania) Mihaela Steff	(Belarus) Tatyana Kostromina (Belarus) Viktoria Pavlovich	(Russia) Svetlana Ganina (Russia) Irina Palina
2003	Courmayeur	(Croatia) Tamara Boroš (Romania) Mihaela Steff	(Hungary) Csilla Bátorfi (Hungary) Krisztina Tóth	(Serbia and Montenegro) Anamaria Erdelji (Serbia and Montenegro) Silvija Erdelji
2003	Courmayeur	(Croatia) Tamara Boroš (Romania) Mihaela Steff	(Hungary) Csilla Bátorfi (Hungary) Krisztina Tóth	(Russia) Svetlana Ganina (Russia) Irina Palina
2005	Aarhus	(Croatia) Tamara Boroš (Romania) Mihaela Steff	(Hungary) Csilla Bátorfi (Hungary) Krisztina Tóth	(Russia) Svetlana Ganina (Russia) Irina Palina
2005	Aarhus	(Croatia) Tamara Boroš (Romania) Mihaela Steff	(Hungary) Csilla Bátorfi (Hungary) Krisztina Tóth	(Italy) Wenling Tan Monfardini (Italy) Nikoleta Stefanova
2007	Belgrade	(Russia) Svetlana Ganina (Belarus) Viktoria Pavlovich	(Hungary) Georgina Póta (Hungary) Krisztina Tóth	(Italy) Wenling Tan Monfardini (Italy) Nikoleta Stefanova
2007	Belgrade	(Russia) Svetlana Ganina (Belarus) Viktoria Pavlovich	(Hungary) Georgina Póta (Hungary) Krisztina Tóth	(Germany) Elke Wosik (Germany) Wu Jiaduo
2008	Saint Petersburg	(Hungary) Georgina Póta (Hungary) Krisztina Tóth	(Italy) Wenling Tan Monfardini (Italy) Nikoleta Stefanova	(Russia) Oksana Fadeyeva (Belarus) Veronika Pavlovich
2008	Saint Petersburg	(Hungary) Georgina Póta (Hungary) Krisztina Tóth	(Italy) Wenling Tan Monfardini (Italy) Nikoleta Stefanova	(Poland) Natalia Partyka (Poland) Xu Jie
2009	Stuttgart	(Romania) Daniela Dodean (Romania) Elizabeta Samara	(Italy) Wenling Tan Monfardini (Italy) Nikoleta Stefanova	(Germany) Zhenqi Barthel (Germany) Kristin Silbereisen
2009	Stuttgart	(Romania) Daniela Dodean (Romania) Elizabeta Samara	(Italy) Wenling Tan Monfardini (Italy) Nikoleta Stefanova	(Russia) Oksana Fadeyeva (Lithuania) Rūta Paškauskienė
2010	Ostrava	(Russia) Oksana Fadeyeva (Lithuania) Rūta Paškauskienė	(Netherlands) Li Jie (Netherlands) Elena Timina	(Romania) Daniela Dodean (Romania) Elizabeta Samara
2010	Ostrava	(Russia) Oksana Fadeyeva (Lithuania) Rūta Paškauskienė	(Netherlands) Li Jie (Netherlands) Elena Timina	(Hungary) Georgina Póta (Hungary) Krisztina Tóth
2011	Gdańsk	(Russia) Oksana Fadeyeva (Lithuania) Rūta Paškauskienė	(Romania) Daniela Dodean (Romania) Elizabeta Samara	(Netherlands) Li Jie (Netherlands) Elena Timina
2011	Gdańsk	(Russia) Oksana Fadeyeva (Lithuania) Rūta Paškauskienė	(Romania) Daniela Dodean (Romania) Elizabeta Samara	(Hungary) Georgina Póta (Hungary) Krisztina Tóth
2012	Herning	(Romania) Daniela Dodean (Romania) Elizabeta Samara	(Hungary) Georgina Póta (Hungary) Krisztina Tóth	(Netherlands) Britt Eerland (Hungary) Dóra Madarász
2012	Herning	(Romania) Daniela Dodean (Romania) Elizabeta Samara	(Hungary) Georgina Póta (Hungary) Krisztina Tóth	(Germany) Kristin Silbereisen (Germany) Wu Jiaduo
2013	Schwechat	(Germany) Petrissa Solja (Germany) Sabine Winter	(Germany) Zhenqi Barthel (Germany) Shan Xiaona	(Spain) Galia Dvorak (Sweden) Matilda Ekholm
2013	Schwechat	(Germany) Petrissa Solja (Germany) Sabine Winter	(Germany) Zhenqi Barthel (Germany) Shan Xiaona	(Spain) Sara Ramírez (Spain) Shen Yanfei
2015	Yekaterinburg	(Turkey) Melek Hu (Spain) Shen Yanfei	(Hungary) Georgina Póta (Romania) Elizabeta Samara	(Germany) Han Ying (Germany) Irene Ivancan
2015	Yekaterinburg	(Turkey) Melek Hu (Spain) Shen Yanfei	(Hungary) Georgina Póta (Romania) Elizabeta Samara	(Netherlands) Li Jie (Poland) Li Qian
2016	Budapest	(Germany) Kristin Silbereisen (Germany) Sabine Winter	(Germany) Shan Xiaona (Germany) Petrissa Solja	(Hungary) Dóra Madarász (Hungary) Szandra Pergel
2016	Budapest	(Germany) Kristin Silbereisen (Germany) Sabine Winter	(Germany) Shan Xiaona (Germany) Petrissa Solja	(Romania) Daniela Monteiro (Romania) Elizabeta Samara
2018	Alicante	(Germany) Kristin Lang (Germany) Nina Mittelham	(Russia) Yana Noskova (Austria) Sofia Polcanova	(Luxembourg) Sarah de Nutte (Luxembourg) Ni Xialian
2018	Alicante	(Germany) Kristin Lang (Germany) Nina Mittelham	(Russia) Yana Noskova (Austria) Sofia Polcanova	(Sweden) Matilda Ekholm (Hungary) Georgina Póta
2020	Warsaw	(Germany) Shan Xiaona (Germany) Petrissa Solja	(Germany) Nina Mittelham (Germany) Sabine Winter	(Ukraine) Tetyana Bilenko (Ukraine) Hanna Haponova
2020	Warsaw	(Germany) Shan Xiaona (Germany) Petrissa Solja	(Germany) Nina Mittelham (Germany) Sabine Winter	(France) Stéphanie Loeuillette (France) Jia Nan Yuan
2022	Munich	(Austria) Sofia Polcanova (Romania) Bernadette Szőcs	(Romania) Andreea Dragoman (Romania) Elizabeta Samara	(Luxembourg) Sarah De Nutte (Luxembourg) Ni Xialian
2022	Munich	(Austria) Sofia Polcanova (Romania) Bernadette Szőcs	(Romania) Andreea Dragoman (Romania) Elizabeta Samara	(Romania) Adina Diaconu (Spain) María Xiao
2024	Linz	(Czech Republic) Hana Matelová (Slovakia) Barbora Balážová	(Austria) Sofia Polcanova (Romania) Bernadette Szőcs	(Serbia) Izabela Lupulesku (Serbia) Sabina Surjan
2024	Linz	(Czech Republic) Hana Matelová (Slovakia) Barbora Balážová	(Austria) Sofia Polcanova (Romania) Bernadette Szőcs	(Poland) Natalia Bajor (Slovakia) Tatiana Kukulkova

=== Mixed doubles ===
Year	Host City	Gold	Silver	Bronze
1958	Budapest	(Hungary) Zoltan Berczik (Hungary) Gizella Lantos	(Hungary) Ferenc Sido (Hungary) Éva Kóczián	
1960	Zagreb	(Romania) Gheorge Cobirzan (Romania) Maria Alexandru	(Romania) Radu Negulescu (Romania) Angelica Rozeanu	
1962	Berlin	(Sweden) Hans Alser (West Germany) Inge Harst	(West Germany) Eberhard Scholer (West Germany) Agnes Simon	
1964	Malmö	(Hungary) Peter Rozsas (Hungary) Sarolta Lukacs	(Czechoslovakia) Vladimir Miko (Czechoslovakia) Marta Luzova	
1966	London	(Czechoslovakia) Vladimir Miko (Czechoslovakia) Marta Luzova	(England) Chester Barnes (England) Mary Shannon	
1968	Lyon	(Soviet Union) Stanislav Gomozkov (Soviet Union) Zoja Rudnova	(Romania) D. Giurgiuca (Romania) Maria Alexandru	
1970	Moscow	(Soviet Union) Stanislav Gomozkov (Soviet Union) Zoja Rudnova	(Soviet Union) Sarkis Sarkhojan (Soviet Union) R. Pogosova	
1972	Rotterdam	(Soviet Union) Stanislav Gomozkov (Soviet Union) Zoja Rudnova	(Sweden) Stellan Bengtsson (Sweden) L. Andersson	
1974	Novi Sad	(Soviet Union) Stanislav Gomozkov (Soviet Union) Zoja Rudnova	(Czechoslovakia) Milan Orlowski (Czechoslovakia) Alica Grofová	
1976	Prague	(Socialist Federal Republic of Yugoslavia) Antun Stipancic (Socialist Federal Republic of Yugoslavia) Erzsebet Palatinus	(Czechoslovakia) Milan Orlowski (Czechoslovakia) Ilona Uhlikova	
1978	Duisburg	(West Germany) Wilfried Lieck (West Germany) Wiebke Hendriksen	(Hungary) Tibor Klampar (Hungary) Gabriella Szabó	
1980	Bern	(Czechoslovakia) Milan Orlowski (Czechoslovakia) Ilona Uhlikova	(England) Desmond Douglas (England) Linda Jarvis	
1982	Budapest	(Poland) Andrzej Grubba (Netherlands) Bettine Vrieskoop	(Socialist Federal Republic of Yugoslavia) Dragutin Surbek (Socialist Federal Republic of Yugoslavia) Branka Batinic	
1984	Moscow	(France) Jacques Secretin (Soviet Union) Valentina Popova	(Czechoslovakia) Jindrich Pansky (Czechoslovakia) Marie Hrachova	
1986	Prague	(Czechoslovakia) Jindrich Pansky (Czechoslovakia) Marie Hrachova	(Socialist Federal Republic of Yugoslavia) Ilija Lupulesku (Socialist Federal Republic of Yugoslavia) Gordana Perkucin	
1988	Paris	(Socialist Federal Republic of Yugoslavia) Ilija Lupulesku (Socialist Federal Republic of Yugoslavia) Jasna Fazlic	(Poland) Andrzej Grubba (Netherlands) Bettine Vrieskoop	
1990	Gothenburg	(France) Jean-Philippe Gatien (France) Xiaoming Wang-Drechou	(Belgium) Jean-Michel Saive (Hungary) C. Wirth	
1992	Stuttgart	(Greece) Kalinikos Kreanga (Romania) Otilia Badescu	(France) Jean-Philippe Gatien (France) Xiaoming Wang-Drechou	
1994	Birmingham	(Croatia) Zoran Primorac (Hungary) Csilla Batorfi	(Greece) Kalinikos Kreanga (Romania) Otilia Badescu	
1996	Bratislava	(Belarus) Vladimir Samsonov (Hungary) Krisztina Toth	(Greece) Kalinikos Kreanga (Romania) Otilia Badescu	
1998	Eindhoven	(Socialist Federal Republic of Yugoslavia) Ilija Lupulescu (Romania) Otilia Badescu	(Sweden) Erik Lindh (Sweden) Marie Svensson	
2000	Bremen	(Socialist Federal Republic of Yugoslavia) Aleksandar Karakasevic (Lithuania) Ruta Paskauskiene	(Socialist Federal Republic of Yugoslavia) Ilija Lupulescu (Sweden) Marie Svensson	
2002	Zagreb	(Poland) Lucjan Blaszczyk (Luxembourg) Xia Lian Ni	(Socialist Federal Republic of Yugoslavia) Aleksandar Karakasevic (Lithuania) Ruta Garkauskaite	
2003	Courmayeur	(Austria) Werner Schlager (Hungary) Krisztina Tóth	(Austria) Weixing Chen (Belarus) Viktoria Pavlovitch	
2005	Aarhus	(Serbia) Aleksandar Karakasevic (Lithuania) Ruta Paskauskiene	(Austria) Weixing Chen (Belarus) Viktoria Pavlovitch	
2007	Belgrade	(Serbia) Aleksandar Karakasevic (Lithuania) Ruta Paskauskiene	(Russia) Fedor Kuzmin (Russia) Oksana Fadeeva	
2009	Subotica	(Serbia) Aleksandar Karakasevic (Lithuania) Ruta Paskauskiene	(Belarus) Evgenyi Chtchatinine (Belarus) Viktoria Pavlovich	
2010	Subotica	(Turkey) Bora Vang (Turkey) Sirin He	(Serbia) Marko Jevtovic (Turkey) Hu Melek	
2011	Istanbul	(Romania) Andrei Filimon (Romania) Elizabeta Samara	(Serbia) Aleksandar Karakasevic (Lithuania) Ruta Paskauskiene	
2012	Buzau	(Romania) Andrei Filimon (Romania) Elizabeta Samara	(Turkey) Bora Vang (Turkey) Hu Melek	
2013	Buzau	(Czech Republic) Antonin Gavlas (Czech Republic) Renata Strbikova	(Slovakia) Lubomir Pistej (Slovakia) Barbora Balazova	
2016	Budapest	(Portugal) Joao Monteiro (Portugal) Daniela Monteiro Dodean	(Sweden) Mattias Karlsson (Sweden) Matilda Ekholm	
2018	Alicante	(Germany) Ruwen Filus (Germany) Han Ying	(Austria) Stefan Fegerl (Austria) Sofia Polcanova	
2020	Warsaw	(Germany) Dang Qiu (Germany) Nina Mittelham	(Slovakia) Lubomir Pistej (Slovakia) Barbora Balazova	
2022	Munich	(France) Emmanuel Lebesson (France) Yuan Jia Nan	(Romania) Ovidiu Ionescu (Romania) Bernadette Szocs	
2024	Linz	(Spain) Alvaro Robles (Spain) Maria Xiao	(Austria) Robert Gardos (Austria) Sofia Polcanova	(France) Simon Gauzy (France) Prithika Pavade
2024	Linz	(Spain) Alvaro Robles (Spain) Maria Xiao	(Austria) Robert Gardos (Austria) Sofia Polcanova	(Germany) Patrick Franziska (Germany) Annett Kaufmann

=== Results of Team Events ===
The tables below are European Table Tennis Champions lists of teams events.

== See also ==
- European Table Tennis Championships
