= 1969 World Table Tennis Championships – Mixed doubles =

1969 Mixed doubles

The 1969 World Table Tennis Championships mixed doubles was the 30th edition of the mixed doubles championship.

Nobuhiko Hasegawa and Yasuko Konno defeated Mitsuru Kono and Saeko Hirota in the final by three sets to nil.

== Results ==
Round ok 10
(Japan) Nobuhiko Hasegawa (Japan) Yasuko Konno	12	21	21	21
(Soviet Union) Sarkis Sarchayan (Soviet Union) Rita Pogosova	21	13	13	16
(Czechoslovakia) Jaroslav Staněk (Czechoslovakia) Ilona Voštová	21	21	21
(Soviet Union) Gegam Vardanian (Soviet Union) Laima Amelina	11	18	17
(England) Denis Neale (England) Mary Wright	21	18	21	21
(Japan) Tetsuo Inoue (Japan) Sachiko Morisawa	13	21	18	12
(Japan) Tokio Tasaka (Japan) Kazuko Ito-Yamaizumi	21	18	21	21
(Soviet Union) Anatoly Amelin (Soviet Union) Svetlana Grinberg	17	21	14	19
(West Germany) Eberhard Schöler (West Germany) Diane Schöler	21	21	21
(Soviet Union) Uldis Eglitis (East Germany) Doris Hovestädt	8	18	14
(Japan) Mitsuru Kono (Japan) Saeko Hirota	21	21	17	21
(Czechoslovakia) Jiri Turai (Czechoslovakia) Alica Grofová	17	19	21	16
(Soviet Union) Stanislav Gomozkov (Soviet Union) Zoja Rudnova	21	21	21
(Czechoslovakia) Vladimír Miko (Czechoslovakia) Jitka Karlíková	9	18	10
(Japan) Shigeo Itoh (Japan) Toshiko Kowada	21	21	21
(Romania) Rolf Andersson (Romania) Carmen Crisan	18	12	16

Quarterfinals
(Japan) Hasegawa (Japan) Konno	21	23	21
(Czechoslovakia) Staněk (Czechoslovakia) Voštová	18	21	12
(England) Neale (England) Wright	20	21	21	21
(Japan) Tasaka (Japan) Ito	22	13	14	19
(West Germany) Schöler (West Germany) Schöler	11	16	19
(Japan) Kono (Japan) Hirota	21	21	21
(Soviet Union) Gomozkov (Soviet Union) Rudnova	21	18	9	19
(Japan) Itoh (Japan) Kowada	13	21	21	21

Semifinals
(Japan) Hasegawa (Japan) Konno	21	21	21
(England) Neale (England) Wright	17	18	14
(Japan) Kono (Japan) Hirota	21	15	22	21
(Japan) Itoh (Japan) Kowada	18	21	20	9

Final
(Japan) Hasegawa (Japan) Konno	21	21	21
(Japan) Kono (Japan) Hirota	17	19	19

== See also ==
- List of World Table Tennis Championships medalists
