= 1969 World Table Tennis Championships – Men's team =

1969 Swaythling Cup (men's team)

The 1969 World Table Tennis Championships – Swaythling Cup (men's team) was the 30th edition of the men's team championship.

Japan won the gold medal defeating West Germany 5–3 in the final. Yugoslavia won the bronze medal after winning the third place play off. The Chinese team were again absent.

== Medalists ==
Event	Gold	Silver	Bronze
	Japan; Nobuhiko Hasegawa; Tetsuo Inoue; Shigeo Itoh; Kenji Kasai; Mitsuru Kono	West Germany; Bernt Jansen; Wilfried Lieck; Martin Ness; Eberhard Schöler	Yugoslavia; Zlatko Cordas; Istvan Korpa; Antun Stipančić; Dragutin Šurbek; Edvard Vecko

== Second stage round ==
=== Group 1 ===
Pos	Team	P	W	L	Pts
1	Japan	5	5	0	10
2	(Socialist Federal Republic of Yugoslavia) Yugoslavia	5	4	1	8
3	England	5	3	2	6
4	Soviet Union	5	2	3	4
5	Hungary	5	1	4	2
6	Denmark	5	0	5	0

=== Group 2 ===
Pos	Team	P	W	L	Pts
1	West Germany	5	5	0	10
2	South Korea	5	3	3	6
3	Sweden	5	3	2	6
4	Czechoslovakia	5	3	2	6
5	France	5	1	4	2
6	(Republic of Ireland) Ireland	5	0	5	0

== Third-place playoff ==
Team One	Team Two	Score
Yugoslavia	South Korea	5–0

== Final ==
Japan 5		West Germany 3	Score
Kono	bt	Jansen	15–21 21–16 12–21
Hasegawa	bt	Lieck	22–20 21–13
Itoh	lost to	Schöler	17–21 21–8 12–21
Kono	bt	Schöler	23–21 14–21 21–17
Hasegawa	lost to	Jansen	18–21 17–21
Itoh	bt	Lieck	21–16 21–17
Hasegawa	lost to	Schöler	21–15 13–21 17–21
Kono	bt	Lieck	21–13 21–16

== See also ==
List of World Table Tennis Championships medalists
