= 1971 World Table Tennis Championships =

1971 edition of the World Table Tennis Championships

The 1971 World Table Tennis Championships (31st) were held in Nagoya from March 28 to April 7, 1971. The Chinese players returned following a lengthy absence.

The nations represented were Austria, Czechoslovakia, the People's Republic of China, England, West Germany, Hungary, India, Japan, North Korea, South Korea, Romania, the Soviet Union, Sweden and Yugoslavia.

== Medalists ==
=== Team ===
| Event | Gold | Silver | Bronze |
|---|---|---|---|
| Swaythling Cup; Men's Team | China; Li Furong; Li Jingguang; Liang Geliang; Xi Enting; Zhuang Zedong | Japan; Nobuhiko Hasegawa; Tetsuo Inoue; Shigeo Itoh; Mitsuru Kono; Tokio Tasaka | Yugoslavia; Zlatko Cordas; Milivoj Karakašević; Istvan Korpa; Antun Stipančić; Dragutin Šurbek |
| Corbillon Cup; Women's team | Japan; Yasuko Konno; Toshiko Kowada; Emiko Ohba; Yukie Ohzeki | China; Li Li; Lin Huiqing; Lin Meiqun; Zheng Minzhi | South Korea; Choi Jung-Sook; Chung Hyun-sook; Lee Ailesa; Na In-Sook |

=== Individual ===
| Event | Gold | Silver | Bronze |
|---|---|---|---|
| Men's singles | (Sweden) Stellan Bengtsson | (Japan) Shigeo Itoh | (China) Xi Enting |
| Men's singles | (Sweden) Stellan Bengtsson | (Japan) Shigeo Itoh | (Socialist Federal Republic of Yugoslavia) Dragutin Šurbek |
| Women's singles | (China) Lin Huiqing | (China) Zheng Minzhi | (Czechoslovakia) Ilona Vostova |
| Women's singles | (China) Lin Huiqing | (China) Zheng Minzhi | (China) Li Li |
| Men's doubles | (Hungary) István Jónyer (Hungary) Tibor Klampár | (China) Liang Geliang (China) Zhuang Zedong | (Japan) Nobuhiko Hasegawa (Japan) Tokio Tasaka |
| Men's doubles | (Hungary) István Jónyer (Hungary) Tibor Klampár | (China) Liang Geliang (China) Zhuang Zedong | (Japan) Katsuyuki Abe (Japan) Yujiro Imano |
| Women's doubles | (China) Lin Huiqing (China) Zheng Minzhi | (Japan) Mieko Hirano (Japan) Reiko Sakamoto | (Japan) Miho Hamada (Japan) Yukie Ohzeki |
| Women's doubles | (China) Lin Huiqing (China) Zheng Minzhi | (Japan) Mieko Hirano (Japan) Reiko Sakamoto | (Japan) Yukiko Kawamorita (Japan) Setsuko Kobori |
| Mixed doubles | (China) Zhang Xielin (China) Lin Huiqing | (Socialist Federal Republic of Yugoslavia) Antun Stipančić (Romania) Maria Alexandru | (West Germany) Eberhard Schöler (West Germany) Diane Schöler |
| Mixed doubles | (China) Zhang Xielin (China) Lin Huiqing | (Socialist Federal Republic of Yugoslavia) Antun Stipančić (Romania) Maria Alexandru | (Japan) Tokuyasu Nishii (Japan) Mieko Fukuno |

== See also ==
- Ping-pong diplomacy
