= 1969 World Table Tennis Championships – Women's team =

1969 Corbillon Cup (women's team)

The 1969 World Table Tennis Championships – Corbillon Cup (women's team) was the 23rd edition of the women's team championship.

The Soviet Union won the gold medal, Romania won the silver medal and Japan won the bronze medal.

== Medalists ==
Event	Gold	Silver	Bronze
	Soviet Union; Laima Amelina; Svetlana Grinberg; Rita Pogosova; Zoja Rudnova	Romania; Maria Alexandru; Carmen Crișan; Eleonora Mihalca	Japan; Saeko Hirota; Yasuko Konno; Toshiko Kowada; Sachiko Morisawa

== Second stage ==
=== Group A ===
Pos	Team	P	W	L	Pts
1	Romania	5	5	0	10
2	Japan	5	4	1	8
3	West Germany	5	3	2	6
4	East Germany	5	2	3	4
5	Sweden	5	1	4	2
6	Hungary	5	0	5	0

=== Group B ===
Pos	Team	P	W	L	Pts
1	Soviet Union	5	5	0	10
2	Czechoslovakia	5	4	1	8
3	South Korea	5	3	2	6
4	Poland	5	2	3	4
5	England	5	1	4	2
6	(Socialist Federal Republic of Yugoslavia) Yugoslavia	5	0	5	0

== Third-place playoff ==
Team One	Team Two	Score
Japan	Czechoslovakia	3–2

== Final ==
Soviet Union 3		Romania 0	Score
Rudnova	bt	Alexandru	25–23 21–17
Grinberg	bt	Crisan	21–17 21–13
Grinberg & Rudnova	bt	Alexandru & Crisan	21–18 21–18

== See also ==
List of World Table Tennis Championships medalists
