= 1967 World Table Tennis Championships – Women's doubles =

1967 Women's doubles

The 1967 World Table Tennis Championships women's doubles was the 28th edition of the women's doubles championship. Saeko Hirota and Sachiko Morisawa defeated Noriko Yamanaka and Naoko Fukatsu in the final by three sets to nil.

== Results ==
Round of 16
(Japan) Naoko Fukatsu (Japan) Noriko Yamanaka	21	21	21
(Romania) Maria Alexandru (Romania) Eleonora Mihalca	17	5	8
(Soviet Union) Signe Paisjärv (Soviet Union) Laima Balaišytė	7	21	21	17	21
(Sweden) Marita Neidert (Sweden) Eva Johansson	21	19	17	21	9
(Socialist Federal Republic of Yugoslavia) Cirila Piric (Socialist Federal Republic of Yugoslavia) Radmila Stojsic	23	21	21
(Netherlands) Ursula Stulemeyert (Netherlands) Ria Bogmans	21	18	11
(West Germany) Inge Harst (West Germany) Diane Schöler	11	21	15	19
(Hungary) Éva Foldi-Kóczián (Hungary) Erzsebet Jurik	21	13	21	21
(Soviet Union) Zoja Rudnova (Soviet Union) Svetlana Grinberg	21	21	21
(East Germany) Gabriele Geissler (East Germany) Doris Hovestädt	17	13	9
(England) Mary Wright-Shannon (England) Karenza Smith	18	21	21	21
(Poland) Dabuta Szmidt-Calinska (Poland) Czeslawa Nowaryla	21	16	13	8
(West Germany) Agnes Simon (West Germany) Edit Buchholz	17	21	21	18	21
(Hungary) Sarolta Lukacs (Hungary) Beatrix Kisházi	21	12	13	21	15
(Czechoslovakia) Marta Luzová (Czechoslovakia) Jitka Karlíková	16	12	17
(Japan) Saeko Hirota (Japan) Sachiko Morisawa	21	21	21

Quarterfinals
(Japan) Fukatsu (Japan) Yamanaka	16	21	21	21
(Soviet Union) Paisjärv (Soviet Union) Balaišytė	21	14	14	6
(Socialist Federal Republic of Yugoslavia) Piric (Socialist Federal Republic of Yugoslavia) Stojsic	18	21	21	16	11
(Hungary) Foldi-Kóczián (Hungary) Jurik	21	10	16	21	21
(Soviet Union) Rudnova (Soviet Union) Grinberg	21	21	21
(England) Wright (England) Smith	14	16	16
(West Germany) Simon (West Germany) Buchholz	10	16	12
(Japan) Hirota (Japan) Morisawa	21	21	21

Semifinals
(Japan) Fukatsu (Japan) Yamanaka	21	21	16	21
(Hungary) Foldi-Kóczián (Hungary) Jurik	18	16	21	8
(Soviet Union) Rudnova (Soviet Union) Grinberg	13	19	21	21	19
(Japan) Hirota (Japan) Morisawa	21	21	16	15	21

Final
(Japan) Fukatsu (Japan) Yamanaka	19	17	20
(Japan) Hirota (Japan) Morisawa	21	21	22

== See also ==
List of World Table Tennis Championships medalists
