= 1969 World Table Tennis Championships – Women's singles =

1969 Women's singles

The 1969 World Table Tennis Championships women's singles was the 30th edition of the women's singles championship. Toshiko Kowada defeated Gabriele Geissler in the final by three sets to one, to win the title.

== Results ==
Round of 16
(England) Pauline Piddock	17	17	17
(West Germany) Edit Buchholz	21	21	21
(East Germany) Gabriele Geissler	22	15	21	21
(Soviet Union) Svetlana Grinberg	20	21	17	12
(Japan) Miho Hamada	21	17	21	21
(West Germany) Rosemarie Seidel	15	21	10	13
(Romania) Eleonora Mihalca	27	21	21
(Hungary) Beatrix Kisházi	25	10	10
(Romania) Carmen Crișan	21	21	21
(South Korea) Ro Hwa Ja	12	15	13
(Japan) Toshiko Kowada	19	21	23	21
(Socialist Federal Republic of Yugoslavia) Mirjana Resler	21	10	21	18
(Romania) Maria Alexandru	21	21	13	21
(East Germany) Doris Hovestädt	12	12	21	14
(England) Diane Schöler-Rowe	21	21	21
(Japan) Kazuko Ito-Yamaizumi	14	12	9

Quarterfinals
(West Germany) Buchholz	21	21	19	15	18
(East Germany) Geissler	18	18	21	21	21
(Japan) Hamada	21	14	21	21
(Romania) Mihalca	11	21	17	12
(Romania) Crisan	18	21	19	21	19
(Japan) Kowada	21	16	21	19	21
(Romania) Alexandru	21	21	21
(England) Schöler-Rowe	19	17	15

Semifinals
(East Germany) Geissler	14	19	24	21	22
(Japan) Hamada	21	21	22	14	20
(Japan) Kowada	21	21	20	21
(Romania) Alexandru	16	15	22	13

Final
(East Germany) Geissler	22	14	17	8
(Japan) Kowada	20	21	21	21

== See also ==
List of World Table Tennis Championships medalists
