= 1971 World Table Tennis Championships – Men's doubles =

1971 Men's doubles

The 1971 World Table Tennis Championships men's doubles was the 31st edition of the men's doubles championship.

István Jónyer and Tibor Klampár won the title after defeating Chuang Tse-tung and Liang Ko-liang in the final by three sets to one.

== Results ==
Round of 16
(Hungary) István Jónyer (Hungary) Tibor Klampár	15	21	21	22
(Japan) Tetsuo Inoue (Japan) Yukio Shibata	21	16	19	20
(Czechoslovakia) Jiri Turai (Czechoslovakia) Milan Orlowski	21	12	21	18	14
(China) Chon Lan-sun (China) Yu Chang-chun	9	21	16	21	21
(West Germany) Bernt Jansen (West Germany) Klaus Schmittinger	11	17	14
(Socialist Federal Republic of Yugoslavia) Antun Stipančić (Socialist Federal Republic of Yugoslavia) Dragutin Šurbek	21	21	21
(Japan) Nobuhiko Hasegawa (Japan) Tokio Tasaka	21	21	21
(North Korea) Kim Chang-Ho (North Korea) Pak Sin Il	16	15	17
(Japan) Katsuyuki Abe (Japan) Yujiro Imano	21	21	16	21
(Socialist Federal Republic of Yugoslavia) Milivoj Karakašević (Socialist Federal Republic of Yugoslavia) Istvan Korpa	17	18	21	15
(Japan) Tokuyasu Nishii (Japan) Masahiko Ohya	21	21	23	21
(Czechoslovakia) Stefan Kollarovits (Czechoslovakia) Jaroslav Kunz	17	18	25	16
(China) Chuang Tse-tung (China) Liang Ko-liang	16	21	21	21
(South Korea) Choi Seung-Kuk (South Korea) Whang Sang-Wan	21	12	12	9
(West Germany) Wilfried Lieck (West Germany) Martin Ness	5	21	19	15
(Japan) Shigeo Itoh (Japan) Mitsuru Kono	21	17	21	21

Quarterfinals
(Hungary) Jónyer (Hungary) Klampár	23	21	21
(China) Chon Lan-sun (China) Yu Chang-chun	21	18	15
(Socialist Federal Republic of Yugoslavia) Stipancic (Socialist Federal Republic of Yugoslavia) Šurbek	17	21	18	21	12
(Japan) Hasegawa (Japan) Tasaka	21	10	21	15	21
(Japan) Abe (Japan) Imano	22	21	18	21
(Japan) Nishii (Japan) Ohya	20	12	21	11
(China) Chuang Tse-tung (China) Liang Ko-liang	21	21	20	21
(Japan) Itoh (Japan) Kono	16	18	22	16

Semifinals
(Hungary) Jónyer (Hungary) Klampár	21	21	21
(Japan) Hasegawa (Japan) Tasaka	15	16	14
(Japan) Abe (Japan) Imano	18	19	18
(China) Chuang Tse-tung (China) Liang Ko-liang	21	21	21

Final
(Hungary) Jónyer (Hungary) Klampár	11	21	21	21
(China) Chuang Tse-tung (China) Liang Ko-liang	21	16	10	16

== See also ==
List of World Table Tennis Championships medalists
