= 1967 World Table Tennis Championships – Women's singles =

1967 Women's singles

The 1967 World Table Tennis Championships women's singles was the 29th edition of the women's singles championship. Sachiko Morisawa defeated Naoko Fukatsu in the final by three sets to one, to win the title.

== Results ==
Round of 16
(Japan) Naoko Fukatsu	21	21	21
(England) Diane Scholer-Rowe	8	18	14
(England) Mary Wright Shannon	21	22	21
(Czechoslovakia) Jitka Karlíková	19	20	18
(Soviet Union) Zoja Rudnova	21	13	21	21
(Hungary) Éva Foldi-Kóczián	18	21	13	14
(Japan) Saeko Hirota	21	17	21	12	10
(Romania) Maria Alexandru	14	21	16	21	21
(Japan) Sachiko Morisawa	21	21	21
(Poland) Danuta Calinska-Szmidt	6	12	10
(East Germany) Gabriele Geissler	21	21	19	21
(Romania) Eleonora Mihalca	15	19	21	14
(Czechoslovakia) Marta Luzova	21	20	21	21
(Hungary) Agnes Simon-Almási	11	22	10	14
(Netherlands) Ursula Stulemeyer	11	14	12
(Japan) Noriko Yamanaka	21	21	21

Quarterfinals
(Japan) Fukatsu	21	21	21
(England) Shannon-Wright	14	19	19
(Soviet Union) Rudnova	23	21	21
(Romania) Alexandru	21	12	15
(Japan) Morisawa	21	21	21
(East Germany) Geissler	19	16	17
(Czechoslovakia) Luzova	16	18	17
(Japan) Yamanaka	21	21	21

Semifinals
(Japan) Fukatsu	21	21	21
(Soviet Union) Rudnova	14	15	14
(Japan) Morisawa	21	17	21	21	21
(Japan) Yamanaka	19	21	23	6	18

Final
(Japan) Fukatsu	18	21	18	17
(Japan) Morisawa	21	15	21	21

== See also ==
- List of World Table Tennis Championships medalists
