= 1969 World Table Tennis Championships – Men's doubles =

1969 Men's doubles

The 1969 World Table Tennis Championships men's doubles was the 30th edition of the men's doubles championship. Hans Alsér and Kjell Johansson won the title after defeating Nobuhiko Hasegawa and Tokio Tasaka in the final by three sets to one.

== Results ==
Round of 16
(Sweden) Hans Alsér (Sweden) Kjell Johansson	18	21	16	21	21
(Soviet Union) Sarkis Sarchayan (Soviet Union) Gegam Vardanian	21	8	21	13	13
(Socialist Federal Republic of Yugoslavia) Istvan Korpa (Socialist Federal Republic of Yugoslavia) Dragutin Šurbek	12	21	23	21	23
(Hungary) Matyas Beleznai (Hungary) István Jónyer	21	9	25	10	21
(Japan) Shigeo Itoh (Japan) Mitsuru Kono	21	21	21
(Soviet Union) Uldis Eglitis (England) Trevor Taylor	18	15	14
(Czechoslovakia) Jiri Turai (Czechoslovakia) Milan Orlowski	18	14	12
(West Germany) Bernt Jansen (West Germany) Hans Micheiloff	21	21	21
(Japan) Nobuhiko Hasegawa (Japan) Tokio Tasaka	21	21	21
(Sweden) Bo Persson (Sweden) Carl-Johan Bernhardt	13	15	10
(West Germany) Conny Freundorfer (West Germany) Ernst Gomolla	19	21	15	4
(Czechoslovakia) Vladimir Miko (Czechoslovakia) Jaroslav Staněk	21	19	21	21
(Japan) Kenji Kasai (Japan) Tetsuo Inoue	21	22	22
(West Germany) Karl-Heinz Scholl (West Germany) Jochen Leiss	16	20	20
(Soviet Union) Anatoly Amelin (Soviet Union) Stanislav Gomozkov	17	21	21	21
(Poland) Andrzej Domicz (Poland) Witold Woznica	21	11	13	18

Quarterfinals
(Sweden) Alsér (Sweden) Johansson	21	21	21
(Socialist Federal Republic of Yugoslavia) Korpa (Socialist Federal Republic of Yugoslavia) Šurbek	9	10	11
(Japan) Itoh (Japan) Kono	21	21	21
(West Germany) Jansen (West Germany) Micheiloff	13	18	16
(Japan) Hasegawa (Japan) Tasaka	21	21	21	21
(Czechoslovakia) Miko (Czechoslovakia) Stanek	23	16	17	18
(Japan) Kasai (Japan) Inoue	15	21	21	17	12
(Soviet Union) Amelin (Soviet Union) Gomozkov	21	15	12	21	21

Semifinals
(Sweden) Alsér (Sweden) Johansson	20	21	21	21
(Japan) Itoh (Japan) Kono	22	13	18	9
(Japan) Hasegawa (Japan) Tasaka	21	21	21
(Soviet Union) Amelin (Soviet Union) Gomozkov	19	19	18

Final
(Sweden) Alsér (Sweden) Johansson	21	17	21	21
(Japan) Hasegawa (Japan) Tasaka	19	21	8	12

== See also ==
List of World Table Tennis Championships medalists
