= 1969 World Table Tennis Championships – Men's singles =

1969 Men's singles

The 1969 World Table Tennis Championships men's singles was the 30th edition of the men's singles championship.

Shigeo Itoh defeated Eberhard Schöler in the final, winning three sets to two to secure the title.

== Results ==
Round of 16
(Japan) Nobuhiko Hasegawa	21	9	17	21	17
(Socialist Federal Republic of Yugoslavia) Antun Stipančić	18	21	21	12	21
(Japan) Kenji Kasai	21	21	25
(Indonesia) Sugeng Soewindo	9	15	23
(Japan) Shigeo Itoh	21	21	21
(Hungary) Istvan Korpa	19	19	17
(Soviet Union) Stanislav Gomozkov	21	21	21
(South Korea) Chung Cha Hyun	17	8	12
(Japan) Tetsuo Inoue	21	11	21	19	21
(Socialist Federal Republic of Yugoslavia) Dragutin Šurbek	17	21	14	21	12
(Japan) Tokio Tasaka	21	21	21	21
(South Korea) Chu Chang Sul	23	16	15	12
(Czechoslovakia) Jaroslav Staněk	21	21	11	21
(Hungary) István Jónyer	13	14	21	13
(West Germany) Eberhard Schöler	15	24	21	18	21
(Soviet Union) Anatoly Amelin	21	22	8	21	16

Quarterfinals
(Socialist Federal Republic of Yugoslavia) Stipanic	20	21	16	21	17
(Japan) Kasai	22	15	21	15	21
(Japan) Itoh	21	21	21
(Soviet Union) Gomozkov	18	16	15
(Japan) Inoue	18	22	14
(Japan) Tasaka	21	24	21
(Czechoslovakia) Stanek	19	21	14	14
(West Germany) Schöler	21	17	21	21

Semifinals
(Japan) Kasai	14	15	14
(Japan) Itoh	21	21	21
(Japan) Tasaka	14	16	21	21	12
(West Germany) Schöler	21	21	18	18	21

Final
(Japan) Itoh	19	14	21	21	21
(West Germany) Schöler	21	21	19	15	9

== See also ==
List of World Table Tennis Championships medalists
