= 1971 World Table Tennis Championships – Men's team =

1971 Swaythling Cup (men's team)

The 1971 World Table Tennis Championships – Swaythling Cup (men's team) was the 31st edition of the men's team championship.

China won the gold medal defeating Japan 5–2 in the final. Yugoslavia won the bronze medal after winning the third place play off.

== Medalists ==
Event	Gold	Silver	Bronze
	China; Li Fu-jung; Li Ching-kuang; Liang Ko-liang; Hsi En-ting; Chuang Tse-tung	Japan; Nobuhiko Hasegawa; Tetsuo Inoue; Shigeo Itoh; Mitsuru Kono; Tokio Tasaka	Yugoslavia; Zlatko Cordas; Milivoj Karakašević; Istvan Korpa; Antun Stipančić; Dragutin Šurbek

== Second stage round ==
=== Group 1 ===
Pos	Team	P	W	L	Pts
1	Japan	5	5	0	10
2	(Socialist Federal Republic of Yugoslavia) Yugoslavia	5	4	1	8
3	West Germany	5	3	2	6
4	South Korea	5	2	3	4
5	England	5	1	4	2
6	Indonesia	5	0	5	0

=== Group 2 ===
Pos	Team	P	W	L	Pts
1	China	5	5	0	10
2	Sweden	5	4	1	8
3	Hungary	5	3	2	6
4	France	5	2	3	4
5	North Korea	5	1	4	2
6	Czechoslovakia	5	0	5	0

== Third-place playoff ==
Team One	Team Two	Score
Yugoslavia	Sweden	5–3

== Final ==
China 5		Japan 2	Score
Liang Ko-liang	lost to	Hasegawa	21–15 8–21 19–21
Liang Ko-liang	bt	Itoh	21–11 21–15
Chuang Tse-tung	bt	Itoh	21–19 17–21 21–15
Chuang Tse-tung	lost to	Kono	12–21 16–21
Li Ching-kuang	bt	Kono	21–13 21–18
Li Ching-kuang	bt	Hasegawa	15–21 21–19 21–18
Li Ching-kuang	bt	Itoh	21–3 21–6

== See also ==
List of World Table Tennis Championships medalists
