= 1971 World Table Tennis Championships – Women's singles =

1971 Women's singles

The 1971 World Table Tennis Championships women's singles was the 31st edition of the women's singles championship. Lin Hui-ching defeated Cheng Min-chih in the final by three sets to one, to win the title.

== Results ==
Round of 16
(Japan) Toshiko Kowada	21	23	21	16	11
(China) Cheng Huai-ying	12	25	17	21	21
(China) Li Li	19	21	21	13	21
(Romania) Maria Alexandru	21	12	12	21	17
(Czechoslovakia) Alica Grofová	21	21	23
(Japan) Emiko Ohba	17	16	21
(China) Cheng Min-chih	21	21	21
(Japan) Reiko Sakamoto	10	15	9
(Czechoslovakia) Ilona Uhlíková-Voštová	21	21	19	21
(Japan) Yasuko Konno	11	15	21	10
(Japan) Kasuko Inoue	21	21	21	21
(Soviet Union) Elmira Antonyan	23	14	16	13
(China) Lin Hui-ching	21	21	15	21
(Japan) Miho Hamada	9	6	21	15
(Japan) Yukie Ozeki	21	21	22
(Soviet Union) Zoja Rudnova	15	11	20

Quarterfinals
(China) Cheng Huai-ying	11	10	13
(China) Li Li	21	21	21
(Czechoslovakia) Grófová	10	15	9
(China) Cheng Min-chih	21	21	21
(Czechoslovakia) Uhlíková-Voštová	21	17	21	21
(Japan) Inoue	18	21	12	13
(China) Lin Hui-ching	18	21	21	16	21
(Japan) Ozeki	21	10	9	21	10

Semifinals
(China) Li Li	11	10	13
(China) Cheng Min-chih	21	21	21
(Czechoslovakia) Uhlíková-Voštová	9	5	14
(China) Lin Hui-ching	21	21	21

Final
(China) Cheng Min-chih	17	15	21	19
(China) Lin Hui-ching	21	21	13	21

== See also ==
List of World Table Tennis Championships medalists
