= 1971 World Table Tennis Championships – Men's singles =

1971 Men's singles

The 1971 World Table Tennis Championships men's singles was the 31st edition of the men's singles championship.

Stellan Bengtsson defeated Shigeo Itoh in the final, winning three sets to one to secure the title.

== Results ==
Round of 16
(Japan) Shigeo Itoh	16	17	21	21	22
(Japan) Masahiko Ohya	21	21	18	14	20
(China) Li Fu-Jung	11	21	21	21	22
(Hungary) István Jónyer	21	16	23	11	20
(Czechoslovakia) Milan Orlowski	21	7	21	12	24
(Japan) Tokio Tasaka	16	21	7	21	22
(Socialist Federal Republic of Yugoslavia) Dragutin Šurbek	21	21	21
(Japan) Yujiro Imano	16	13	16
(Hungary) Tibor Klampár	21	15	14	21	21
(Socialist Federal Republic of Yugoslavia) Antun Stipančić	15	21	21	19	14
(China) Hsi En-ting	21	22	21
(Japan) Mitsuru Kono	14	20	18
(Czechoslovakia) Jaroslav Kunz	24	21	21
(West Germany) Wilfried Lieck	22	11	8
(Sweden) Stellan Bengtsson	21	7	18	21	21
(Japan) Nobuhiko Hasegawa	13	21	21	12	19

Quarterfinals
(Japan) Itoh	17	21	21	21
(China) Fu-jung	21	12	16	11
(Czechoslovakia) Orlowski	21	12	15	19
(Socialist Federal Republic of Yugoslavia) Šurbek	19	21	21	21
(Hungary) Klampar	21	17	21	18
(China) En-ting	23	21	14	21
(Czechoslovakia) Kuynz	14	19	17
(Sweden) Bengtsson	21	21	21

Semifinals
(Japan) Itoh	21	19	21	21
(Socialist Federal Republic of Yugoslavia) Šurbek	12	21	16	18
(China) En-ting	19	19	19
(Sweden) Bengtsson	21	21	21

Final
(Japan) Itoh	17	21	13	10
(Sweden) Bengtsson	21	19	21	21

== See also ==
List of World Table Tennis Championships medalists
