= 1971 World Table Tennis Championships – Women's team =

1971 Corbillon Cup (women's team)

The 1971 World Table Tennis Championships – Corbillon Cup (women's team) was the 24th edition of the women's team championship.

Japan won the gold medal, China won the silver medal and South Korea won the bronze medal.

== Medalists ==
Event	Gold	Silver	Bronze
	Japan; Yasuko Konno; Toshiko Kowada; Emiko Ohba; Yukie Ozeki	China; L'i Li-fen; Lin Hui-ching; Lin Mei Chun; Cheng Min-chih	South Korea; Choi Jung-Sook; Chung Hyun-sook; Lee Ailesa; Na In-Sook

== Second stage ==
=== Group A ===
Pos	Team	P	W	L	Pts
1	China	5	5	0	10
2	Czechoslovakia	5	3	2	6
3	Soviet Union	5	3	2	6
4	England	5	3	2	6
5	Sweden	5	1	4	2
6	France	5	0	5	0

=== Group B ===
Pos	Team	P	W	L	Pts
1	Japan	5	5	0	10
2	South Korea	5	4	1	8
3	Romania	5	3	2	6
4	West Germany	5	2	3	4
5	Hungary	5	1	4	2
6	Cambodia	5	0	5	0

== Third-place playoff ==
Team One	Team Two	Score
South Korea	Czechoslovakia	3–2

== Final ==
Japan 3		China 1	Score
Kowada	bt	Cheng Min-chih	21–17 21–9
Kowada	bt	Lin Hui-ching	21–18 17–21 21–19
Ohzeki	bt	Lin Hui-ching	18–21 21–16 25–23
Kowada & Ohba	lost to	Lin Hui-ching & Cheng Min-chih	9–21 21–15 15–21

== See also ==
List of World Table Tennis Championships medalists
