= Martin Ness =

German table tennis player

Personal information
- Nationality: Germany
- Born: 18 February 1942 Augsburg, Bavaria, Germany
- Died: 12 October 1987 (aged 45)
Medal record
Representing West Germany
World Table Tennis Championships
Silver medal – second place	1969	Men's Team

Martin Ness was a male international table tennis player from Germany.

He won a silver medal at the 1969 World Table Tennis Championships in the Swaythling Cup (men's team event) with Wilfried Lieck, Bernt Jansen and Eberhard Schöler for West Germany.

== See also ==
- List of table tennis players
- List of World Table Tennis Championships medalists
