= Choi Hwan-hwan =

South Korean table tennis player

Personal information
- Nationality: South Korea
- Born: 1951 (age 74–75)

Korean name
- Hangul: 최환환
- Hanja: 崔丸煥
- RR: Choe Hwanhwan
- MR: Ch'oe Hwanhwan
Medal record
Representing South Korea
World Table Tennis Championships
Bronze medal – third place	1969	Women's doubles

Choi Hwan-hwan is a female former international table tennis player from South Korea.

== Early life ==
Choi's parents were both table tennis players. She attended Shinkwang Girls' High School in Seoul.

== Table tennis career ==
She won a bronze medal at the 1969 World Table Tennis Championships in the women's doubles with Choi Jung-sook.

She played in the 1968 Asian Championships as a 17 year old.

== See also ==
- List of table tennis players
- List of World Table Tennis Championships medalists
