= Bernt Jansen =

German table tennis player

Personal information
- Nationality: Germany
- Born: 27 July 1949 (age 76) Meppen, West Germany
Medal record
Representing West Germany
World Table Tennis Championships
Silver medal – second place	1969	Men's Team

Bernt Jansen is a male former international table tennis player from Germany.

He won a silver medal at the 1969 World Table Tennis Championships in the Swaythling Cup (men's team event) with Wilfried Lieck, Martin Ness and Eberhard Schöler for West Germany.

== See also ==
- List of table tennis players
- List of World Table Tennis Championships medalists
