= Carmen Crișan =

Romanian table tennis player

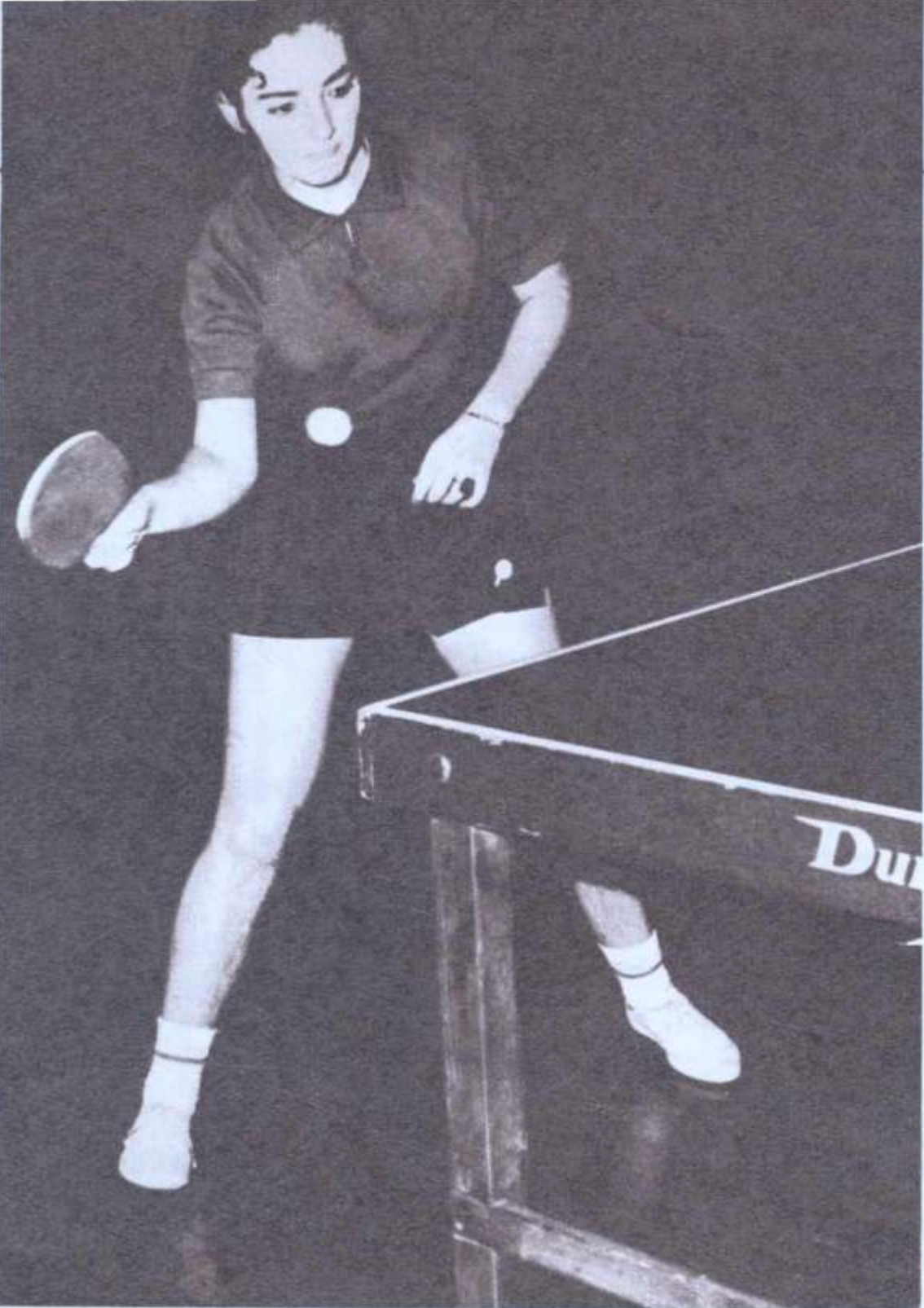
- Crișan in 1970

Personal information
- Nationality: Romania
Medal record
Representing Romania
World Table Tennis Championships
Silver medal – second place	1969	Women's team

Carmen Crișan is a female former international table tennis player from Romania. She was born on December 28, 1951, the only child of Tiberiu and Elisabeta Crișan in Homorod, Romania, while the family was in internal exile due to her father's political affiliations.

In 1967 and 1968 she won the Girls' Singles at the European Table Tennis Championships. In 1975 she graduated as a Chemical Engineer from the Bucharest Polytechnic University. The same year she married Romanian Davis Cup player Toma Ovici.

== Table tennis career ==
She won a silver medal at the 1969 World Table Tennis Championships in the Corbillon Cup (women's team event) with Maria Alexandru and Eleonora Mihalca.

She was ranked world number 13 in 1969 and also won two European Table Tennis Championships medals.

== See also ==
- List of World Table Tennis Championships medalists
