= Choi Jung-sook =

South Korean table tennis player

Personal information
- Nationality: South Korea
- Born: 1947 (age 78–79)
Medal record
Representing South Korea
World Table Tennis Championships
Bronze medal – third place	1969	Women's doubles
Bronze medal – third place	1971	Women's team

Choi Jung-sook is a female former international table tennis player from South Korea.

== Table tennis career ==
She won a bronze medal at the 1969 World Table Tennis Championships in the women's doubles with Choi Hwan-hwan and won a second bronze two years later in the Corbillon Cup (women's team event) at the 1971 World Table Tennis Championships.

She also won four medals in the Asian Championships.

== See also ==
- List of table tennis players
- List of World Table Tennis Championships medalists
