= Edvard Vecko =

Yugoslav table tennis player

Personal information
- Nationality: Slovenia
- Born: 29 October 1944 (age 81) Hrastnik, Slovenia
Medal record
Men's table tennis
Representing Yugoslavia
World Championships
Bronze medal – third place	1969 Munich	Men's team

Edvard Vecko (born 29 October 1944) is a male former international table tennis player from Slovenia.

He won a bronze medal at the 1969 World Table Tennis Championships in the Swaythling Cup (men's team event) with Zlatko Cordas, Antun Stipančić, Dragutin Šurbek and Istvan Korpa for Yugoslavia.

He also won five European Table Tennis Championships medals.

== See also ==
- List of table tennis players
- List of World Table Tennis Championships medalists
