= Miho Hamada =

Japanese table tennis player

Personal information
- Nationality: Japan
- Born: 1947 (age 78–79)
Medal record
Representing Japan
World Table Tennis Championships
Bronze medal – third place	1969	Women's singles
Bronze medal – third place	1971	Women's doubles
Gold medal – first place	1973	Women's doubles
Bronze medal – third place	1973	Women's team

Miho Hamada (濱田 美穂, Hamada Miho) is a former Japanese international table tennis player.

== Table tennis career ==
She won a bronze medal at the 1969 World Table Tennis Championships in the women's singles. Two years later she won another bronze at the 1971 World Table Tennis Championships in the women's doubles with Yukie Ozeki.

She won a gold medal in the women's doubles with Maria Alexandru, and another bronze in the team event at the 1973 World Table Tennis Championships.

== See also ==
- List of table tennis players
- List of World Table Tennis Championships medalists
