= Zlatko Čordaš =

Serbo-Croatian table tennis player

Personal information
- Nationality: Serbia; Croatia
- Born: 26 September 1948 (age 77) Kragujevac
Medal record
Representing Yugoslavia
World Table Tennis Championships
Bronze medal – third place	1969	Men's Team
Bronze medal – third place	1971	Men's Team

Zlatko Čordaš is a male former international table tennis player and coach from Serbia and Croatia.

He won a bronze medal at the 1969 World Table Tennis Championships in the Swaythling Cup (men's team event) with Istvan Korpa, Antun Stipančić, Dragutin Šurbek and Edvard Vecko for Yugoslavia.

Two years later he won a bronze medal at the 1971 World Table Tennis Championships in the Swaythling Cup (men's team event) with Milivoj Karakašević, Korpa, Stipančić and Šurbek.

He also won two European Table Tennis Championships medals. In 2004 he was appointed a Competition Manager at the 2004 World Team Table Tennis Championships in Doha.

== See also ==
- List of table tennis players
- List of World Table Tennis Championships medalists
