= Kenji Kasai =

Japanese table tennis player

Personal information
- Nationality: Japan
Medal record
Representing Japan
World Table Tennis Championships
| Gold medal – first place | 1969 | Men's Team |
| Bronze medal – third place | 1969 | Men's Singles |

Kenji Kasai (笠井 賢二, Kasai Kenji) is a Japanese former international table tennis player.

He won a gold medal and bronze medal at the 1969 World Table Tennis Championships in the men's team event and men's singles, respectively.

== See also ==
- List of table tennis players
- List of World Table Tennis Championships medalists
