= Wilfried Lieck =

German table tennis player

Personal information
- Nationality: Germany
- Born: 29 October 1945 (age 80) Aalborg, Denmark
Medal record
Representing West Germany
World Table Tennis Championships
Silver medal – second place	1969	Men's Team

Wilfried Lieck is a male former international table tennis player from Germany.

He won a silver medal at the 1969 World Table Tennis Championships in the Swaythling Cup (men's team event) with Martin Ness, Bernt Jansen and Eberhard Schöler for West Germany.

He also won two European Table Tennis Championships medals.

== Material and playing style ==
Lieck played according to the sponsor butterfly an offensive blade with both sides sriver 2,0 mm. He played nearly every ball as a counter ball, attacks with very low spin and playing counterballs to win points standing close to the table.

== See also ==
- List of table tennis players
- List of World Table Tennis Championships medalists
