= Gabriele Geißler =

German table tennis player

Personal information
- Born: 1 November 1944 Dresden
- Died: 14 June 2006 (aged 61) Berlin
Medal record
Representing East Germany
World Table Tennis Championships
Silver medal – second place	1969	Women's singles

Gabriele Geißler (later Orgis; 1 November 1944 – 14 June 2006), was a female East German international table tennis player.

She won a silver medal at the 1969 World Table Tennis Championships in the women's singles. Between 1963 and 1980 she was nine times East German national champion.

== See also ==
- List of table tennis players
- List of World Table Tennis Championships medalists
