= Rita Pogosova =

Soviet table tennis player

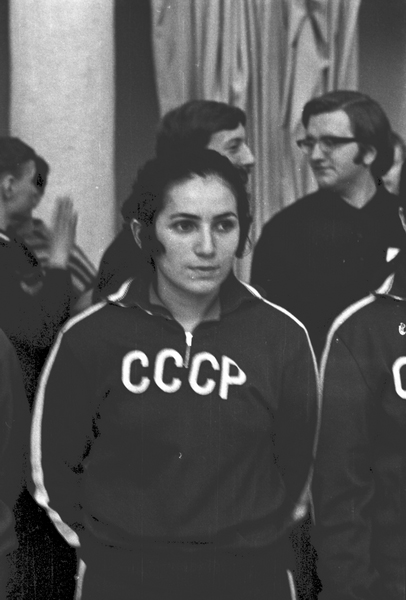

Personal information
- Full name: Pogosova Rita
- Nationality: Soviet Union
- Born: 6 December 1948 (age 77) Baku, Azerbaijani SSR, Soviet Union

Sport
- Sport: Table tennis
Medal record
Women's table tennis
Representing Soviet Union
World Championships
Gold medal – first place	1969 Munich	Team

Rita Pogosova is a former Soviet Union table tennis player. She won a gold medal in the Women's event at the 1969 World Table Tennis Championships.
