= Ilona Uhlíková-Voštová =

Czechoslovak table tennis player

Personal information
- Nationality: Czechoslovakia
- Born: 9 April 1954 (age 72) Stod, Czechoslovakia

Sport
- Sport: Table tennis
Medal record
Women's table tennis
Representing Czechoslovakia
World Championships
Bronze medal – third place	1971 Nagoya	Singles
Bronze medal – third place	1969 Munich	Doubles
European Championships
Bronze medal – third place	1980 Berne	Singles
Gold medal – first place	1980 Berne	Mixed Doubles
Bronze medal – third place	1978 Duisburg	Doubles
Silver medal – second place	1978 Duisburg	Team
Silver medal – second place	1976 Prague	Mixed Doubles
Bronze medal – third place	1972 Rotterdam	Singles
Bronze medal – third place	1972 Rotterdam	Mixed Doubles
Silver medal – second place	1970 Moscow	Singles
Silver medal – second place	1970 Moscow	Team
Gold medal – first place	1968 Lyon	Singles

Ilona Uhlíková-Voštová (born 9 April 1954) is a Czechoslovak female former international table tennis player.

== Table tennis career ==
From 1968 to 1980 she won several medals in singles, doubles, and team events in the Table Tennis European Championships and in the World Table Tennis Championships

She won a bronze medal at the 1969 World Table Tennis Championships in the women's doubles with Jitka Karlíková and two years later won a second bronze at the 1971 World Table Tennis Championships in the women's singles.

She also won five English Open titles.

== See also ==
- List of table tennis players
- List of World Table Tennis Championships medalists
