= Jitka Karlíková =

Czech table tennis player

Personal information
- Nationality: Czechoslovakia
- Born: 9 February 1947 (age 79) Litomyšl
Medal record
Representing Czechoslovakia
World Table Tennis Championships
Bronze medal – third place	1969	Women's doubles

Jitka Karlíková is a female former international table tennis player from Czechoslovakia.

== Table tennis career ==
She won a bronze medal at the 1969 World Table Tennis Championships in the women's doubles with Ilona Uhlíková-Voštová.

She also won three European Championship medals including a gold medal in 1968.

== See also ==
- List of table tennis players
- List of World Table Tennis Championships medalists
