= Tokio Tasaka =

Japanese table tennis player

Personal information
- Nationality: Japan
- Born: 4 September 1947 (age 78)
Medal record
Representing Japan
World Table Tennis Championships
Silver medal – second place	1969	Men's Doubles
Bronze medal – third place	1969	Men's Singles
Silver medal – second place	1971	Men's Team
Bronze medal – third place	1971	Men's Doubles
Bronze medal – third place	1973	Men's Team
Silver medal – second place	1977	Men's Team
Silver medal – second place	1977	Mixed Doubles

Tokio Tasaka (田阪 登紀夫, Tasaka Tokio; born September 4, 1947) is a Japanese former international table tennis player.

He won seven World Table Tennis Championships medals; fours silver medals and three bronze medals. His doubles partners were Nobuhiko Hasegawa and Sachiko Yokota.

After retiring from table tennis he studied sports science at the Osaka Sports University and became a noted sports scientist.

== See also ==
- List of table tennis players
- List of World Table Tennis Championships medalists
