= Svetlana Grinberg =

Soviet table tennis player

Svetlana Grinberg (Fedorova)
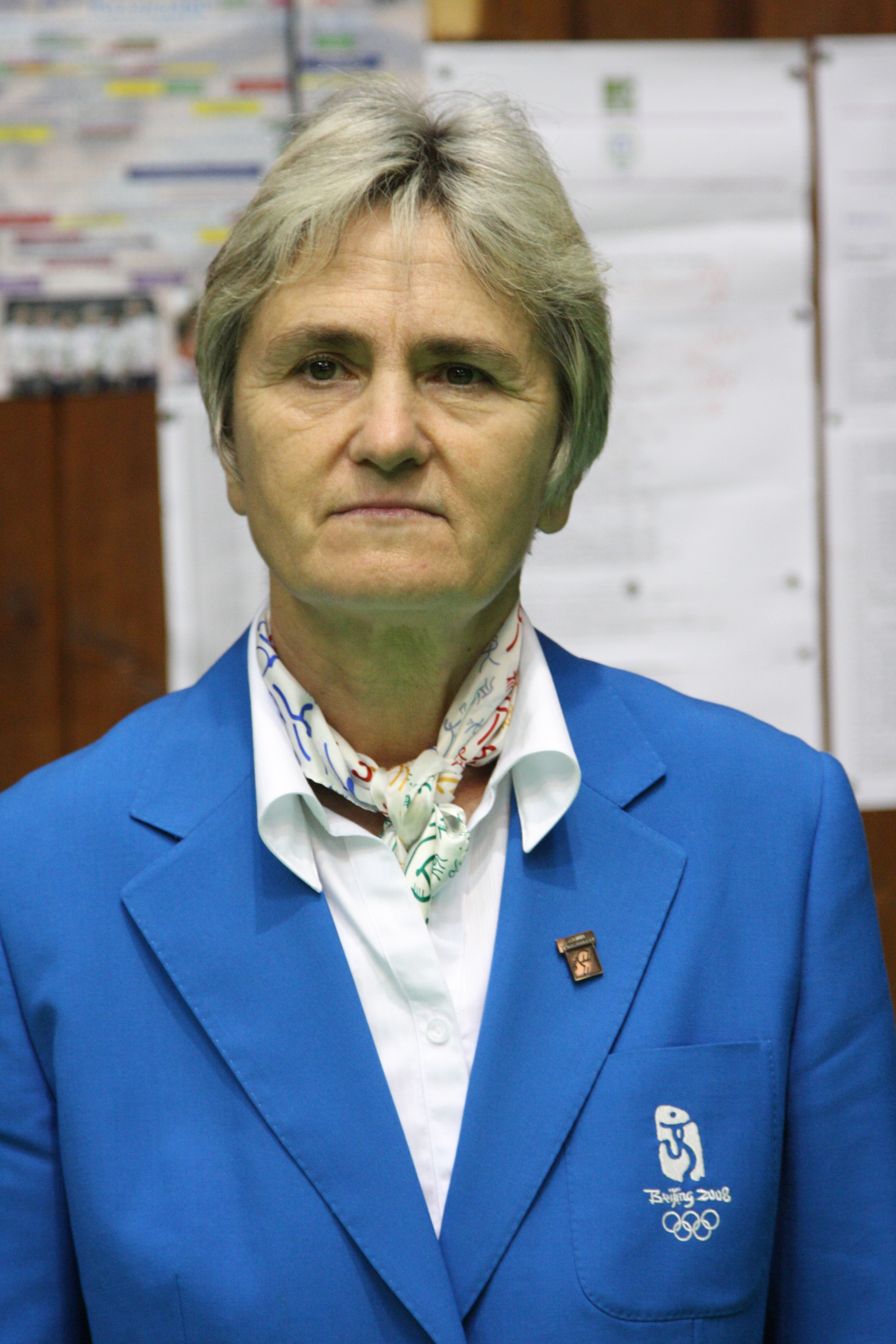

Personal information
- Full name: Grinberg Svetlana
- Nationality: Soviet Union
- Born: 10 October 1944 (age 81) Moscow

Sport
- Sport: Table tennis
Medal record
Women's table tennis
Representing Soviet Union
World Championships
Gold medal – first place	1969 Munich	Doubles
Gold medal – first place	1969 Munich	Team
Bronze medal – third place	1967 Stockholm	Doubles
Silver medal – second place	1967 Stockholm	Team

Svetlana Grinberg (married name Fedorova), is a former female international table tennis player from Soviet Union.

== Table tennis career ==
From 1967 to 1970 she won several medals in singles, doubles, and team events in the Table Tennis European Championships and in the World Table Tennis Championships.

Her four World Championship medals included two gold medals in the doubles with Zoja Rudnova and the team event at the 1969 World Table Tennis Championships.

She also won two English Open titles.

== See also ==
- List of table tennis players
- List of World Table Tennis Championships medalists

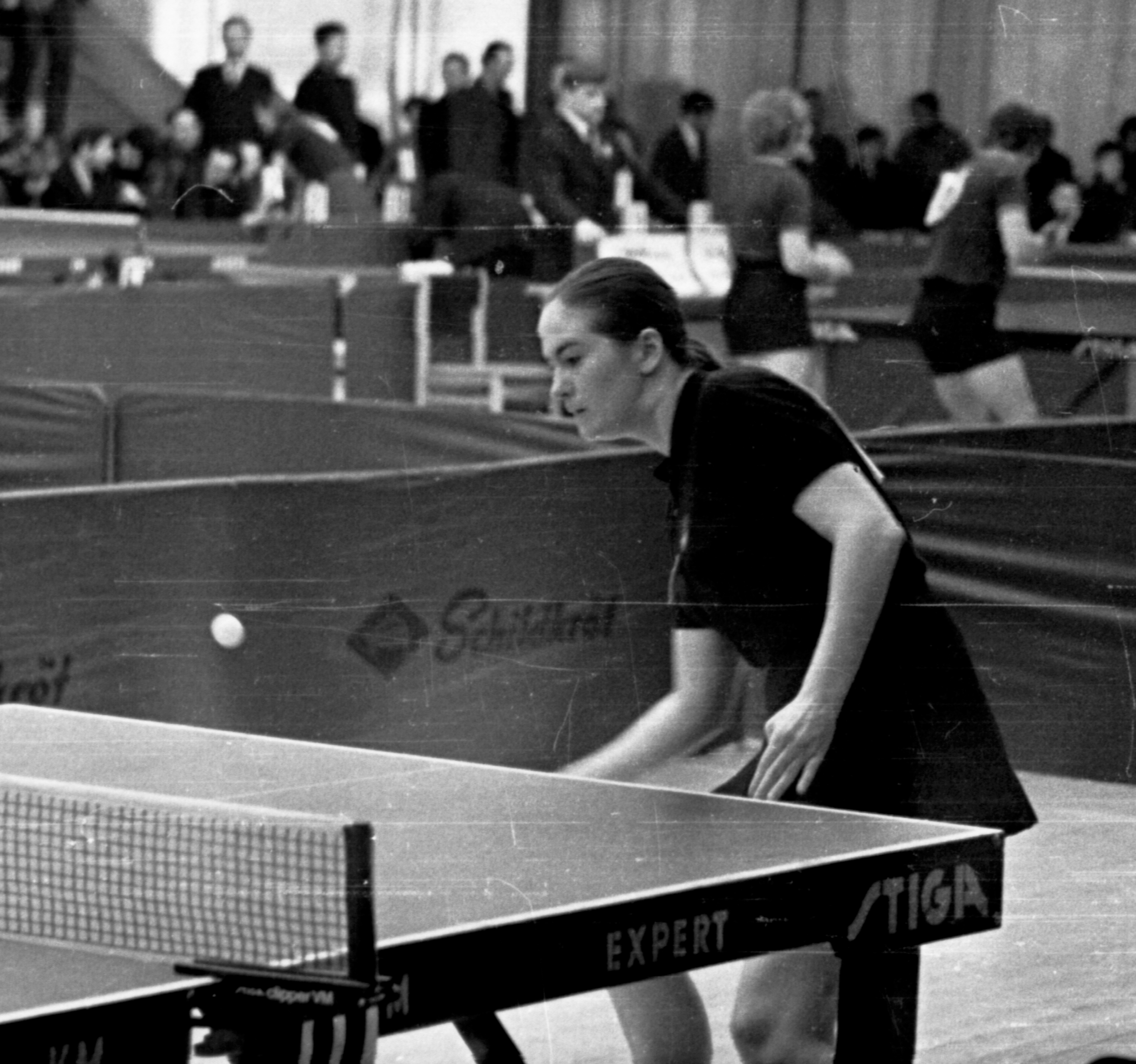
Svetlana Grinberg in 1972
