= Yasuko Konno =

Japanese table tennis player

Personal information
- Nationality: Japan
- Born: 1950 (age 75–76)

Sport
- Sport: Table tennis
Medal record
Women's table tennis
Representing Japan
World Championships
Gold medal – first place	1971 Nagoya	Team
Gold medal – first place	1969 Munich	Mixed
Bronze medal – third place	1969 Munich	Team

Yasuko Konno (今野 安子, Konno Yasuko) is a former table tennis player from Japan.

== Table tennis career ==
In 1969 and 1971 she won three medals in doubles, and team events in the World Table Tennis Championships.

The three World Championship medals included two gold medals; one in the Corbillon Cup (women's team event) and one in the doubles with Nobuhiko Hasegawa at the 1969 World Table Tennis Championships.

== See also ==
- List of table tennis players
- List of World Table Tennis Championships medalists
