= Ištvan Korpa =

Serbian table tennis player

Istvan Korpa
Personal information
- Born: 24 December 1945 (age 80) Senta, Yugoslavia
Medal record
Representing Yugoslavia
World Table Tennis Championships
Bronze medal – third place	1969	Men's Team
Bronze medal – third place	1971	Men's Team

Ištvan Korpa (born 24 December 1945) is a male former international table tennis player from SFR Yugoslavia.

He won a bronze medal at the 1969 World Table Tennis Championships in the Swaythling Cup (men's team event) with teammates Zlatko Čordaš, Antun Stipančić, Dragutin Šurbek and Edvard Vecko for Yugoslavia.

Two years later he won a bronze medal at the 1971 World Table Tennis Championships in the Swaythling Cup (men's team event) with Čordaš, Stipančić, Šurbek, and Milivoj Karakašević.

He also won nine European Table Tennis Championships medals. He was later a very successful coach.

== See also ==
- List of table tennis players
- List of World Table Tennis Championships medalists
