= Saeko Hirota =

Japanese table tennis player

Personal information
- Full name: Hirota Saeko
- Nationality: Japan
- Born: 1944 (age 81–82)

Sport
- Sport: Table tennis
Medal record
Women's table tennis
Representing Japan
World Championships
Silver medal – second place	1969 Munich	Mixed
Bronze medal – third place	1969 Munich	Team
Gold medal – first place	1967 Stockholm	Doubles
Gold medal – first place	1967 Stockholm	Team

Saeko Hirota (Japanese: 広田 佐枝子) is a former international table tennis player from Japan.

== Table tennis career ==
From 1967 to 1969, she won several medals in doubles, and team events in the World Table Tennis Championships and in the Asian Table Tennis Championships.

Her four World Championship medals included two gold medals in the doubles with Sachiko Morisawa and the team event at the 1967 World Table Tennis Championships.

== See also ==
- List of table tennis players
- List of World Table Tennis Championships medalists
