= Sachiko Morisawa =

Japanese table tennis player

Personal information
- Full name: MORISAWA Sachiko
- Nationality: Japan
- Born: 1943 (age 82–83)

Sport
- Sport: Table tennis
Medal record
Women's table tennis
Representing Japan
World Championships
Bronze medal – third place	1969 Munich	Team
Gold medal – first place	1967 Stockholm	Singles
Gold medal – first place	1967 Stockholm	Doubles
Gold medal – first place	1967 Stockholm	Team
Asian Championships
Bronze medal – third place	1968 Jakarta	Singles
Silver medal – second place	1968 Jakarta	Doubles
Silver medal – second place	1968 Jakarta	Team
Gold medal – first place	1967 Singapore	Doubles
Gold medal – first place	1967 Singapore	Team

Sachiko Morisawa (森沢 幸子 (Morisawa Sachiko); born 1943) is a former international table tennis player from Japan.

== Table tennis career ==
From 1967 to 1969, she won several medals in singles, doubles, and team events in the World Table Tennis Championships and in the Asian Table Tennis Championships.

The four World Championship medals included treble gold in the singles, doubles and team at the 1967 World Table Tennis Championships. Her doubles partner was Saeko Hirota.

== See also ==
- List of table tennis players
- List of World Table Tennis Championships medalists
