= Eleonora Mihalca =

Romanian table tennis player

Eleonora Mihalca (Vlaicov)
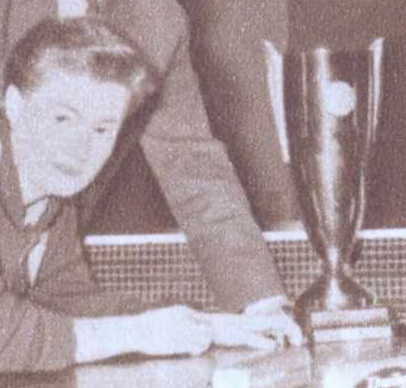
- Eleonora Mihalca in 1965

Personal information
- Nationality: Romania
- Born: 1945 (age 80–81)
Medal record
Representing Romania
World Table Tennis Championships
Silver medal – second place	1969	Women's team
Silver medal – second place	1969	Women's doubles

Eleonora Mihalca (married name Vlaicov; born 1945), is a female former international table tennis player from Romania.

== Table tennis career ==
She won two silver medals at the World Table Tennis Championships; one in the Corbillon Cup (women's team event) and one in the women's doubles with Maria Alexandru.

She married and later played as Eleonora Vlaicov.

== See also ==
- List of table tennis players
- List of World Table Tennis Championships medalists
