= Toshiko Kowada =

Japanese table tennis player

Personal information
- Nationality: Japan
- Born: 17 November 1947 (age 78)

Sport
- Sport: Table tennis
Medal record
Women's table tennis
Representing Japan
World Championships
Gold medal – first place	1971 Nagoya	Team
Gold medal – first place	1969 Munich	Singles
Bronze medal – third place	1969 Munich	Mixed Doubles
Bronze medal – third place	1969 Munich	Team
Asian Championships
Gold medal – first place	1970 Nagoya	Singles
Gold medal – first place	1970 Nagoya	Mixed Doubles
Silver medal – second place	1970 Nagoya	Team
Bronze medal – third place	1968 Jakarta	Singles
Silver medal – second place	1968 Jakarta	Doubles
Silver medal – second place	1968 Jakarta	Mixed Doubles
Silver medal – second place	1968 Jakarta	Team

Toshiko Kowada (小和田 敏子, Kowada Toshiko; born 17 November 1947) is a former international table tennis player from Japan.

== Table tennis career ==
From 1968 to 1971 she won several medals in singles, doubles, and team events in the World Table Tennis Championships and in the Asian Table Tennis Championships.

The four World Championship medals included two gold medals in the singles at the 1969 World Table Tennis Championships and the Corbillon Cup (women's team event) at the 1971 World Table Tennis Championships.

== See also ==
- List of table tennis players
- List of World Table Tennis Championships medalists
