= Eberhard Schöler =

German table tennis player

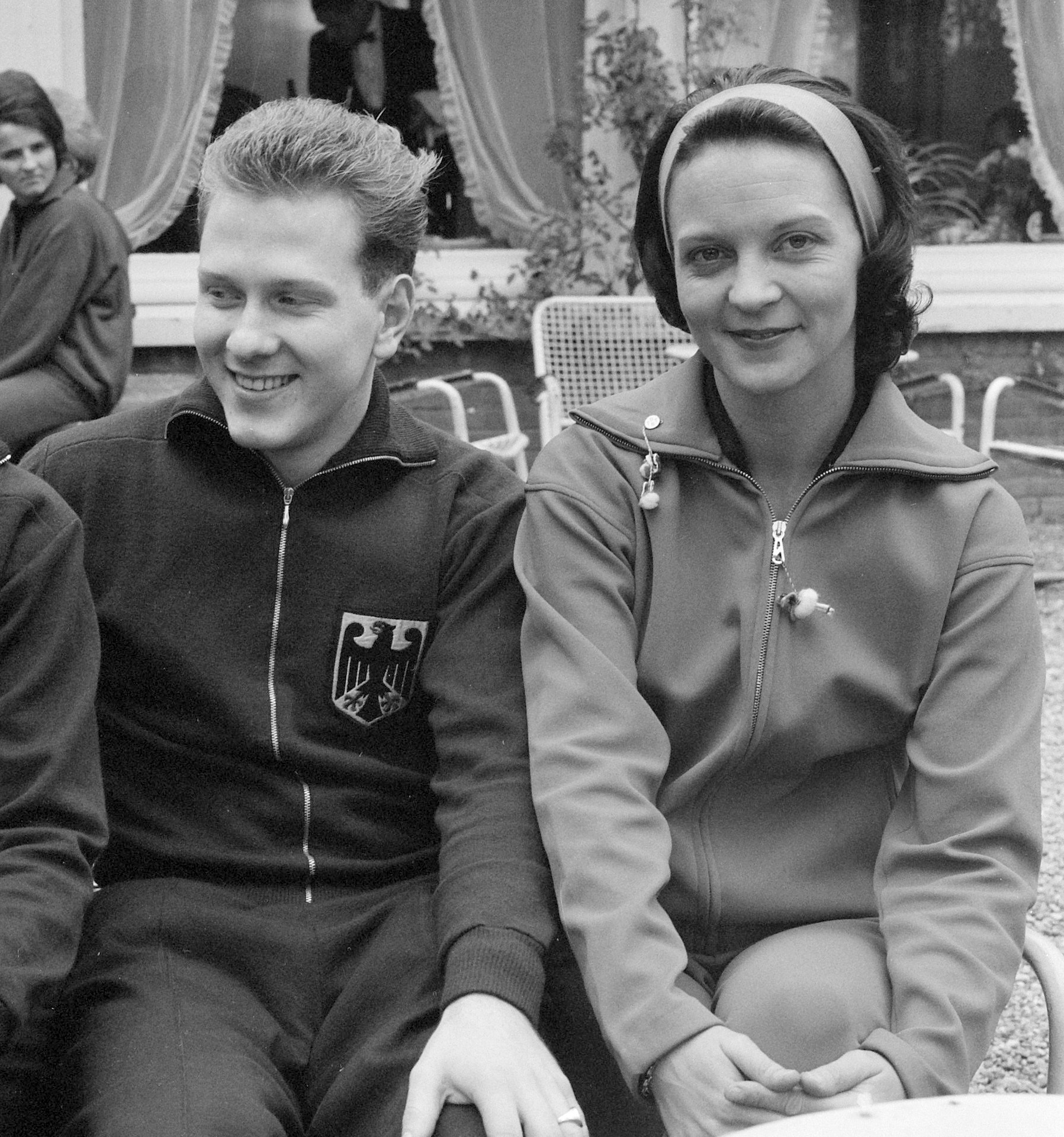
- Schöler and Diane Rowe in 1962

Personal information
- Nickname: Mr.Pokerface
- Nationality: German
- Born: 22 December 1940 (age 85) Flatow, Germany (modern Złotów, Poland)

Sport
- Sport: Table tennis
Medal record
Table tennis
Representing West Germany
World Championships
Silver medal – second place	1986 Rimini	Singles (Masters)
Bronze medal – third place	1971 Nagoya	Mixed doubles
Silver medal – second place	1969 Munich	Singles
Silver medal – second place	1969 Munich	Team
Bronze medal – third place	1967 Stockholm	Singles
Bronze medal – third place	1965 Hala Tivoli	Singles
Bronze medal – third place	1963 Prague	Team
European Championships
Silver medal – second place	1972 Rotterdam	Doubles
Bronze medal – third place	1964 Malmo	Singles
Silver medal – second place	1962 Berlin	Mixed doubles
Bronze medal – third place	1962 Berlin	Singles
Bronze medal – third place	1962 Berlin	Doubles
Bronze medal – third place	1962 Berlin	Team

Eberhard Schöler (born 22 December 1940) is a retired table tennis competitor from West Germany who won several medals at the world and European championships between 1962 and 1972. He was a defensive player known for his calm demeanor, for which he received a nickname "Mr. Poker Face".

Schöler has a degree in business administration. In early 1966, he married Diane Rowe, a table tennis player from England who later competed for Germany; they often competed in mixed doubles together. Schöler and Rowe have a daughter Cindy (born 1968) and son Christian (born 1974). Schöler retired from competitions in the 1970s, but came back in the 1980s and won a silver medal at the 1986 World Championships in the masters category. Since 1990s he held leading positions at the national, European and International Table Tennis Federations.

== Material and playing style ==
Schöler played a defensive blade with different rubbers. On the forehand he played a studs-in surface, with which you can play defensive or offensive, on the backhand a surface with pimples out to play defensive with a lot of backspin. He normally played a defensive style, but was able to attack with the forehand and had a very good smash (Schöler-Peitsche).
