= Tetsuo Inoue =

Japanese table tennis player

Personal information
- Nationality: Japan

Sport
- Sport: Table tennis
Medal record
Men's table tennis
Representing Japan
World Championships
Gold medal – first place	1969 Nagoya	Team
Silver medal – second place	1971 Nagoya	Team
Silver medal – second place	1977 Birmingham	Team

Tetsuo Inoue (井上 哲夫, Inoue Tetsuo) is a male former international table tennis player from Japan.

== Table tennis career ==
In 1969, 1971 and 1977 he won three medals in team events in the World Table Tennis Championships.

His three medals at the World Championship included a gold medal in the Swaythling Cup (men's team) at the 1969 World Table Tennis Championships for Japan.

== See also ==
- List of table tennis players
- List of World Table Tennis Championships medalists
