= Shigeo Itoh =

Japanese table tennis player

Personal information
- Nationality: Japan
- Born: 21 January 1945 (age 81)

Sport
- Sport: Table tennis
Medal record
Men's table tennis
Representing Japan
World Championships
Bronze medal – third place	1975 Calcutta	Doubles
Bronze medal – third place	1975 Calcutta	Mixed Doubles
Silver medal – second place	1971 Nagoya	Singles
Silver medal – second place	1971 Nagoya	Team
Gold medal – first place	1969 Munich	Singles
Bronze medal – third place	1969 Munich	Doubles
Bronze medal – third place	1969 Munich	Mixed Doubles
Gold medal – first place	1969 Munich	Team
Asian Championships
Bronze medal – third place	1970 Nagoya	Singles
Gold medal – first place	1970 Nagoya	Doubles
Bronze medal – third place	1970 Nagoya	Mixed Doubles
Gold medal – first place	1970 Nagoya	Team
Silver medal – second place	1968 Jakarta	Singles
Silver medal – second place	1968 Jakarta	Doubles
Gold medal – first place	1968 Jakarta	Mixed Doubles
Gold medal – first place	1968 Jakarta	Team
Gold medal – first place	1967 Singapore	Doubles
Gold medal – first place	1967 Singapore	Team

Shigeo Itoh (伊藤 繁雄, Itō Shigeo; born January 21, 1945) is a male former table tennis player from Japan.

== Table tennis career ==
From 1967 to 1975 he won eight medals in singles, doubles, and team events in the World Table Tennis Championships and in the Asian Table Tennis Championships.

The eight medals included two gold medals in the men's singles at the 1969 World Table Tennis Championships and men's team event at the 1969 World Table Tennis Championships.

== See also ==
- List of table tennis players
- List of World Table Tennis Championships medalists
