= Maria Alexandru =

Romanian table tennis player (1939–2024)

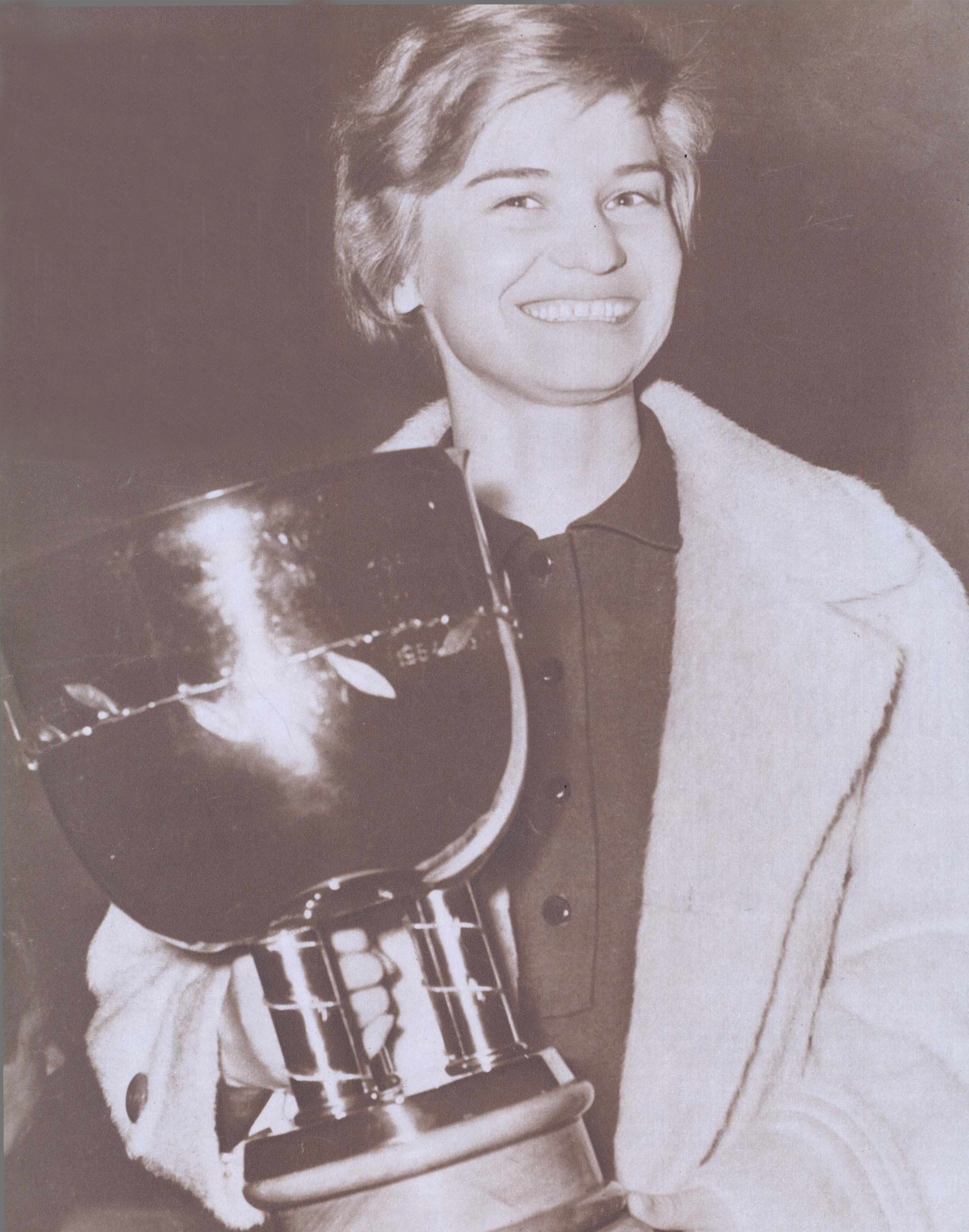
- Alexandru in 1966

Personal information
- Full name: Maria Alexandru
- Nationality: Romania
- Born: 30 December 1939 Plugova, Romania
- Died: 27 November 2024 (aged 84) Băile Herculane, Romania

Sport
- Sport: Table tennis
- Playing style: Shakehand grip
Medal record
Women's table tennis
Representing Romania
World Championships
Gold medal – first place	1975 Calcutta	Doubles
Gold medal – first place	1973 Sarajevo	Doubles
Silver medal – second place	1971 Nagoya	Mixed Doubles
Bronze medal – third place	1969 Munich	Singles
Silver medal – second place	1969 Munich	Doubles
Silver medal – second place	1969 Munich	Women's Team
Bronze medal – third place	1967 Stockholm	Mixed Doubles
Silver medal – second place	1963 Prague	Singles
Silver medal – second place	1963 Prague	Women's Team
Gold medal – first place	1961 Beijing	Doubles
Bronze medal – third place	1961 Beijing	Women's Team
Bronze medal – third place	1957 Stockholm	Doubles
Silver medal – second place	1957 Stockholm	Women's Team
European Championships
Silver medal – second place	1980 Berne	Doubles
Gold medal – first place	1978 Duisburg	Doubles
Silver medal – second place	1976 Prague	Singles
Silver medal – second place	1974 Novi Sad	Doubles
Bronze medal – third place	1974 Novi Sad	Mixed Doubles
Bronze medal – third place	1972 Rotterdam	Singles
Bronze medal – third place	1972 Rotterdam	Doubles
Bronze medal – third place	1972 Moscow	Singles
Bronze medal – third place	1972 Moscow	Doubles
Bronze medal – third place	1968 Lyon	Doubles
Silver medal – second place	1968 Lyon	Mixed Doubles
Gold medal – first place	1966 London	Singles
Bronze medal – third place	1966 London	Mixed Doubles
Silver medal – second place	1964 Malmo	Doubles
Gold medal – first place	1960 Zagreb	Doubles
Gold medal – first place	1960 Zagreb	Mixed Doubles

Maria Alexandru (née Golopența; 30 December 1939 – 27 November 2024) was a Romanian table tennis player.

== Table tennis career ==
From 1957 to 1980 she won several medals in singles, doubles, and team events in the Table Tennis European Championships and in the World Table Tennis Championships.

Between 1953 and 1979, she played in 12 World Championships, winning three gold medals in the doubles competition.

During her active career she played for Progresul Bucharest. She also won eleven English Open titles including six in the singles.

== Death ==
Alexandru died on 27 November 2024, at the age of 84.

== See also ==
- List of table tennis players
- List of World Table Tennis Championships medalists
