= Swedish Open (table tennis) =

Tournament information
- Event name: Swedish Open
- Tour: ITTF World Tour
- Founded: 1954
- Location: Stockholm (since 2013)
- Venue: Eriksdalshallen (since 2013)
- Category: Major Series
- Draw: 32S / 16D
- Prize money: US$170,000 (2019)

The Swedish Open, also known as the Swedish Open Championships (SOC), is an annual table tennis tournament in Sweden, run by the International Table Tennis Federation (ITTF). It is currently part of the ITTF World Tour.

== History ==
The tournament was first held in 1954, and has featured on the ITTF World Tour's schedule frequently since the tour's inception in 1996, including every year since 2011.

China's Fan Zhendong and Wang Liqin jointly hold the record for most men's singles tournament wins, with three. Agnes Simon holds the record for the most women's singles tournament wins, with four, representing the Netherlands for her first title and West Germany for the other three.

In August 2016, it was announced by the ITTF that Stockholm has been chosen as one of six cities to host a regular World Tour event in the revamped 2017 schedule. This is the equivalent of the Major Series status that the tournament currently holds, with "Platinum" events replacing the Super Series as the tour's top tier.

== Champions ==
=== Individual events ===
==== 1954-1987 ====
Year	Men's singles	Women's singles	Men's doubles	Women's doubles	Mixed doubles
1954	(Socialist Federal Republic of Yugoslavia) Žarko Dolinar	(Romania) Angelica Rozeanu	(Czechoslovakia) Ivan Andreadis (Czechoslovakia) Ladislav Štípek	(Romania) Angelica Rozeanu (Romania) Ella Zeller	(Czechoslovakia) Ivan Andreadis (England) Diane Rowe
1955	(Hungary) Kálmán Szepesi	(Romania) Angelica Rozeanu	(Sweden) Tage Flisberg (England) Johnny Leach	(Romania) Angelica Rozeanu (Romania) Ella Zeller	(Hungary) Kálmán Szepesi (Hungary) Éva Kóczián
1957	(Hungary) Zoltán Berczik	(England) Ann Haydon	(Hungary) Zoltán Berczik (Hungary) Ferenc Sidó	(England) Ann Haydon (Hungary) Éva Kóczián	(Romania) Matei Gantner (Romania) Ella Zeller
1958	(Socialist Federal Republic of Yugoslavia) Vojislav Markovic	(Netherlands) Agnes Simon	(Hungary) Zoltán Berczik (Hungary) László Földy	(Netherlands) Agnes Simon (Sweden) Birgitta Tegner	(Romania) Gheorghe Cobirzan (Romania) Maria Alexandru
1959	(China) Zhuang Zedong	(Hungary) Éva Kóczián	(China) Li Furong (China) Zhuang Zedong	(Hungary) Éva Kóczián (Hungary) Sarolta Lukacs-Mathe	(Romania) Gheorghe Cobirzan (Romania) Maria Alexandru
1960	(China) Yang Ruihua	(Germany) Agnes Simon	(China) Yang Ruihua (China) Zhou Lansun	(China) Hu Keming (China) Ma Guanghong	(China) Zhou Lansun (China) Ma Guanghong
1961	(Hungary) Peter Rozsas	(Germany) Agnes Simon	(Czechoslovakia) Ivan Andreadis (Czechoslovakia) Vladimir Miko	(Hungary) Éva Kóczián (England) Diane Rowe	(Hungary) Miklos Peterfy (Hungary) Éva Kóczián
1962	(Socialist Federal Republic of Yugoslavia) Vojislav Markovic	(Hungary) Éva Kóczián	(West Germany) Erich Arndt (West Germany) Dieter Michalek	(Sweden) Britt Andersson (Hungary) Éva Kóczián	(Sweden) Hans Alsér (West Germany) Inge Harst-Muser
1963	(Sweden) Hans Alsér	(Hungary) Éva Kóczián	(Sweden) Hans Alsér (Sweden) Kjell Johansson	(England) Diane Rowe (England) Mary Shannon	(Soviet Union) Anatoly Amelin (Soviet Union) Zoja Rudnova
1965	(China) Wang Jiasheng	(China) Li Henan	(China) Wang Jiasheng (China) Yu Yize	(China) Li Henan (China) Lin Huiqing	(China) Wang Jiasheng (China) Li Henan
1967	(Czechoslovakia) Stefan Kollarowitz	(Soviet Union) Zoja Rudnova	(Soviet Union) Anatoly Amelin (Soviet Union) Stanislav Gomozkov	(Soviet Union) Svetlana Fedorova (Soviet Union) Zoja Rudnova	(Romania) Dorin Giurgiuca (Romania) Maria Alexandru
1969	(Hungary) Tibor Klampár	(Germany) Agnes Simon	(Soviet Union) Anatoly Amelin (Soviet Union) Stanislav Gomozkov	(Romania) Maria Alexandru (Romania) Eleonora Mihalca	(Soviet Union) Stanislav Gomozkov (Soviet Union) Zoja Rudnova
1970	(Sweden) Hans Alsér	(China) Zheng Minzhi	(China) Li Jingguang (China) Zhuang Zedong	(China) Li Li (China) Liang Lizhen	(China) Zhang Xielin (China) Lin Huiqing
1971	(Sweden) Kjell Johansson	(Sweden) Birgitta Rådberg	(Sweden) Stellan Bengtsson (Sweden) Bo Persson	(China) Li Li (China) Zheng Huaiying	(China) Yu Changchun (China) Zheng Huaiying
1972	(Sweden) Kjell Johansson	(South Korea) Lee Ailesa	(Soviet Union) Stanislav Gomozkov (Soviet Union) Sarkis Sarkhojan	(South Korea) Lee Ailesa (South Korea) Park Mi-ra	(Hungary) István Jónyer (Hungary) Judit Magos-Havas
1973	(Socialist Federal Republic of Yugoslavia) Dragutin Šurbek	(China) Yu Jinjia	(Sweden) Stellan Bengtsson (Sweden) Kjell Johanssonn	(England) Jill Hammersley (Hungary) Beatrix Kisházi	(China) Lu Yuansheng (China) Liu Xinyan
1974	(Socialist Federal Republic of Yugoslavia) Dragutin Šurbek	(China) Huang Xiping	(Sweden) Stellan Bengtsson (Sweden) Kjell Johanssonn	(China) Ge Xin'ai (China) Hu Yulan	(Socialist Federal Republic of Yugoslavia) Antun Stipančić (Socialist Federal Republic of Yugoslavia) Erzsebet Palatinus
1975	(Sweden) Stellan Bengtsson	(China) Liu Xinyan	(Socialist Federal Republic of Yugoslavia) Antun Stipančić (Socialist Federal Republic of Yugoslavia) Dragutin Šurbek	(China) Xie Chunying (China) Zhang Deying	(China) Li Peng (China) Li Ming
1976	(China) Guo Yuehua	(North Korea) Pak Yung-sun	(China) Guo Yuehua (China) Liang Geliang	(North Korea) Kim Chang-ae (North Korea) Pak Yung-sun	(China) Liang Geliang (China) Ge Xin'ai
1977	(China) Lu Qiwei	(China) Yang Ying	(France) Patrick Birocheau (France) Jacques Secrétin	(China) Cao Yanhua (China) Tong Ling	(France) Jacques Secrétin (France) Claude Bergeret
1978	(China) Li Zhenshi	(China) Tong Ling	(Hungary) Gábor Gergely (Czechoslovakia) Milan Orlowski	(China) Li Ming (China) Yan Guili	(China) Huang Liang (China) Tong Ling
1979	(Sweden) Stellan Bengtsson	(Sweden) Ann-Christine Hellman	(China) Liao Fumin (China) Wang Huiyuan	(China) Liu Yang (China) Xie Chunying	(Sweden) Stellan Bengtsson (Sweden) Eva Strömvall
1980	(Sweden) Ulf Carlsson	(China) Cao Yanhua	(France) Patrick Birocheau (France) Jacques Secrétin	(South Korea) An Hae-sook (South Korea) Hwang Nam-sook	(China) Guo Yuehua (China) Zhang Deying
1981	(China) Jiang Jialiang	(China) Chen Lili	(Socialist Federal Republic of Yugoslavia) Zoran Kalinić (Socialist Federal Republic of Yugoslavia) Dragutin Šurbek	(Hungary) Judit Magos-Havas (Hungary) Gabriella Szabó	(Poland) Andrzej Grubba (Netherlands) Bettine Vriesekoop
1983	(Sweden) Jan-Ove Waldner	(China) Dai Lili	(Hungary) Tibor Klampár (Hungary) Zsolt Kriston	(China) Jiao Zhimin (China) Li Huifen	(Socialist Federal Republic of Yugoslavia) Dragutin Šurbek (Socialist Federal Republic of Yugoslavia) Branka Batinic
1985	(Poland) Andrzej Grubba	(China) He Zhili	(Socialist Federal Republic of Yugoslavia) Ilija Lupulesku (Socialist Federal Republic of Yugoslavia) Zoran Primorac	(China) Chen Zihe (China) Zhu Juan	(China) Huang Wenguan (China) Zhu Juan
1987	(China) Chen Zhibin	(North Korea) Cho Jung-hui	(France) Patrick Birocheau (France) Jean-Philippe Gatien	(China) Chen Jing (China) Liu Wei	(China) Chen Zhibin (China) Chen Jing

==== 1989-2018 ====
Year	Men's singles	Women's singles	Men's doubles	Women's doubles
1989	(North Korea) Ri Gun-sang	(China) Chen Jing	(France) Jean-Philippe Gatien (Poland) Andrzej Grubba	(North Korea) Ri Pun-hui (North Korea) Yu Sun-bok
1991	(Sweden) Mikael Appelgren	(China) Deng Yaping	(Germany) Steffen Fetzner (Germany) Jörg Roßkopf	(China) Deng Yaping (China) Qiao Hong
1993	(Poland) Andrzej Grubba	(Hungary) Csilla Bátorfi	(China) Lin Zhigang (China) Liu Guoliang	(China) Li Ju (China) Wu Na
1994	(China) Ding Song	(China) Wang Nan		
1995	(Belarus) Vladimir Samsonov	(Chinese Taipei) Chen Jing		
1996	(Sweden) Jörgen Persson	(China) Deng Yaping	(China) Ma Wenge (China) Wang Tao	(China) Deng Yaping (China) Yang Ying
1997	(Belarus) Vladimir Samsonov	(China) Wang Hui	(Poland) Lucjan Blaszczyk (Poland) Tomasz Krzeszewski	(South Korea) Kim Moo-kyo (South Korea) Park Hae-jung
1998	(France) Damien Eloi	(Germany) Qianhong Gotsch-He	(China) Ma Lin (China) Qin Zhijian	(China) Lin Ling (China) Sun Jin
1999	(China) Wang Liqin	(China) Sun Jin	(France) Patrick Chila (France) Jean-Philippe Gatien	(China) Sun Jin (China) Yang Ying
2000	(China) Liu Guozheng	(China) Zhang Yining	(China) Liu Guozheng (China) Ma Lin	(China) Bai Yang (China) Niu Jianfeng
2001	(China) Wang Liqin	(China) Guo Yan	(China) Wang Liqin (China) Yan Sen	(China) Bai Yang (China) Yang Ying
2003	(China) Wang Liqin	(China) Zhang Yining	(China) Ma Lin (China) Wang Hao	(China) Guo Yue (China) Niu Jianfeng
2005	(Germany) Timo Boll	(China) Cao Zhen	(South Korea) Lee Jung-woo (South Korea) Oh Sang-eun	(Hong Kong) Tie Ya Na (Hong Kong) Zhang Rui
2007	(China) Wang Hao	(China) Li Xiaoxia	(China) Ma Long (China) Wang Hao	(South Korea) Kim Kyung-ah (South Korea) Park Mi-young
2011	(China) Ma Long	(China) Guo Yan	(China) Wang Liqin (China) Yan An	(China) Guo Yan (China) Guo Yue
2012	(Sweden) Hampus Nordberg	(North Korea) Kim Song-i		
2013	(China) Yan An	(China) Chen Meng	(Sweden) Jens Lundqvist (China) Xu Xin	(China) Li Xiaodan (China) Mu Zi
2014	(China) Fan Zhendong	(China) Zhu Yuling	(China) Wang Hao (China) Yan An	(China) Liu Shiwen (China) Zhu Yuling
2015	(China) Fan Zhendong	(China) Mu Zi	(China) Fang Bo (China) Xu Xin	(China) Chen Meng (China) Mu Zi
2016	(Japan) Yuya Oshima	(Japan) Kasumi Ishikawa	(Brazil) Hugo Calderano (Brazil) Gustavo Tsuboi	(Chinese Taipei) Cheng I-ching (Chinese Taipei) Lee I-chen
2017	(China) Xu Xin	(China) Chen Xingtong	(China) Fan Zhendong (China) Xu Xin	(Japan) Hina Hayata (Japan) Mima Ito
2018	(China) Fan Zhendong	(Japan) Mima Ito	(Chinese Taipei) Liao Cheng-ting (Chinese Taipei) Lin Yun-Ju	(China) Chen Xingtong (China) Sun Yingsha

==== 2019–present ====
Year	Men's singles	Women's singles	Men's doubles	Women's doubles	Mixed doubles
2019	(China) Wang Chuqin	(China) Chen Meng	(China) Fan Zhendong (China) Xu Xin	(China) Chen Meng (China) Ding Ning	(China) Xu Xin (China) Liu Shiwen

=== Team events ===
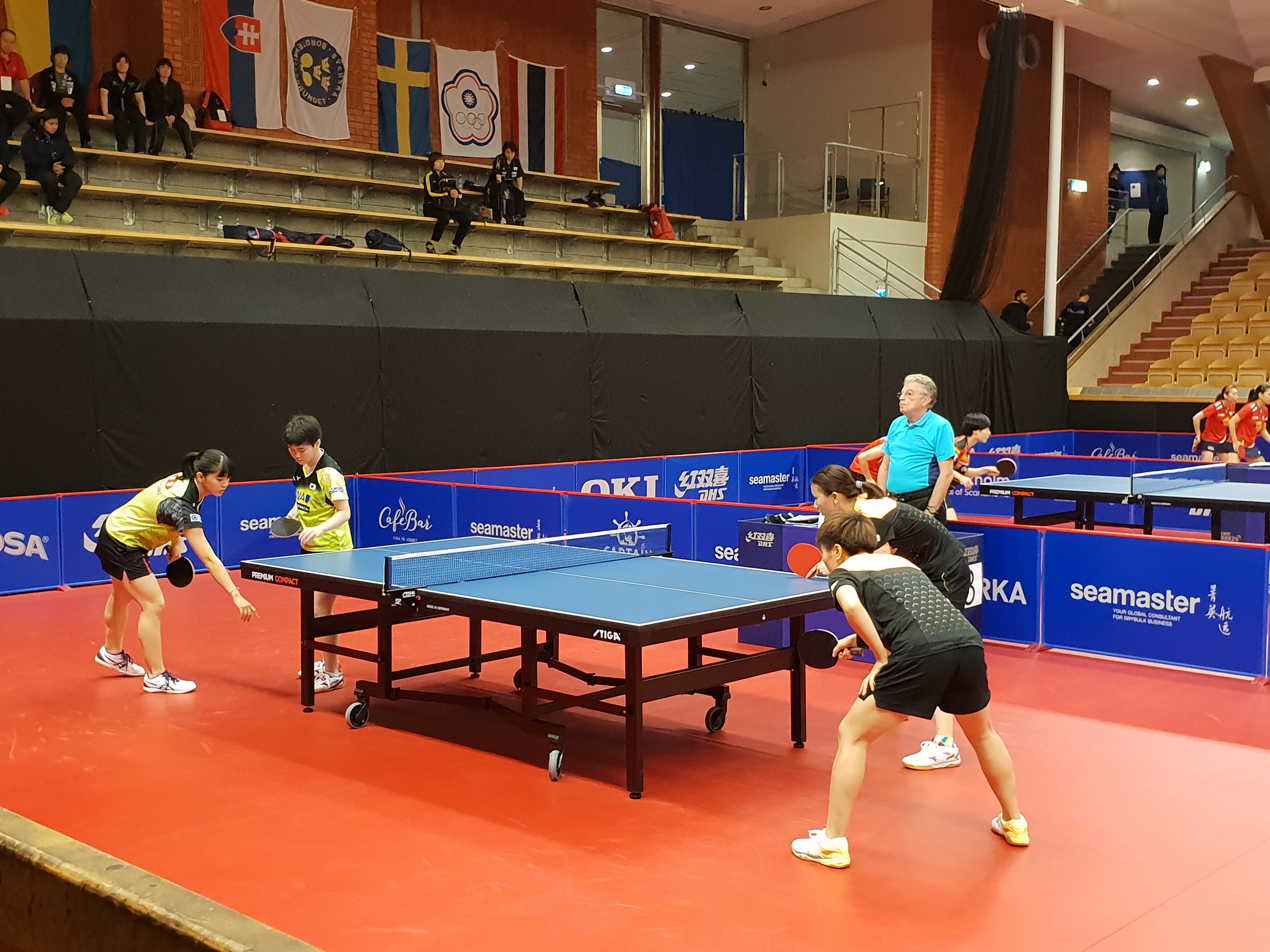
Women's double 2018, Miyu Nagasaki/Satsuki Odo (Japan) vs Liu Gaoyang/Zhang Rui (China)

Year	Men's team	Women's team
1957	Hungary	
1958	Sweden	
1959	China	
1960	(Socialist Federal Republic of Yugoslavia) Yugoslavia	
1961	Hungary	
1962		
1963	Sweden	
1965	China	
1967		
1969	Sweden	Soviet Union
1970	Hungary	China
1971	Sweden	China
1972	(Socialist Federal Republic of Yugoslavia) Yugoslavia	China
1973	Hungary	Sweden
1974	China	Japan
1975	China	China
1976	Hungary	China
1977	China	China
1978	Hungary	China
1979	China Second Team	China Second Team
1980	China	China
1981	(Socialist Federal Republic of Yugoslavia) Yugoslavia	China First Team
1983	China	China
1985	China	China
1987	Sweden First Team	North Korea
1989	North Korea	Hong Kong
1991	Sweden Second Team	China
1993	China	China
1994	Sweden	China
1995	Sweden	China
2012	Sweden First Team	Belarus

== See also ==
- European Table Tennis Union
