= Shanghai International Table Tennis Tournament =

The Shanghai International Table Tennis Tournaments were two friendly table tennis tournaments that took place in Shanghai in 1976 and 1980. They were organized by the Chinese Table Tennis Association.

== Medalists ==
=== Men's singles ===
Year	Gold	Silver	Bronze
1976	(China) Li Zhenshi	(China) Liang Geliang	(China) Guo Yuehua
1976	(China) Li Zhenshi	(China) Liang Geliang	(China) Huang Liang
1980	(China) Wang Huiyuan	(China) Xie Saike	(China) Guo Yuehua
1980	(China) Wang Huiyuan	(China) Xie Saike	(China) Huang Liang

=== Women's singles ===
Year	Gold	Silver	Bronze
1976	(China) Zhang Li	(China) Ge Xin'ai	(China) Yang Ying
1976	(China) Zhang Li	(China) Ge Xin'ai	(China) Zhang Deying
1980	(China) Cao Yanhua	(China) Zhang Deying	(North Korea) Ri Song-suk
1980	(China) Cao Yanhua	(China) Zhang Deying	(China) Qi Baoxiang

=== Men's doubles ===
Year	Gold	Silver	Bronze
1976	(France) Patrick Birocheau (France) Jacques Secrétin	(Socialist Federal Republic of Yugoslavia) Antun Stipančić (Socialist Federal Republic of Yugoslavia) Dragutin Šurbek	(China) Guo Yuehua (China) Huang Liang
1976	(France) Patrick Birocheau (France) Jacques Secrétin	(Socialist Federal Republic of Yugoslavia) Antun Stipančić (Socialist Federal Republic of Yugoslavia) Dragutin Šurbek	(China) Li Zhenshi (China) Liang Geliang
1980	(China) Li Zhenshi (China) Wang Huiyuan	(China) Guo Yuehua (China) Xie Saike	(Japan) Hiroyuki Abe (Japan) Masahiro Maehara
1980	(China) Li Zhenshi (China) Wang Huiyuan	(China) Guo Yuehua (China) Xie Saike	(Japan) Norio Takashima (Japan) Katsuyuki Yochida

=== Women's doubles ===
Year	Gold	Silver	Bronze
1976	(Japan) Fumiko Shinpo (Japan) Sachiko Yokota	(China) Zhang Deying (China) Zhang Li	(China) Ge Xin'ai (China) Yang Ying
1976	(Japan) Fumiko Shinpo (Japan) Sachiko Yokota	(China) Zhang Deying (China) Zhang Li	(West Germany) Ursula Hirschmüller (West Germany) Monika Stumpe
1980	(China) Geng Lijuan (China) Qi Baoxiang	(Japan) Kayoko Kawahigashi (Japan) Rie Wada	(Sweden) Marie Lindblad (Sweden) K. Nilsson
1980	(China) Geng Lijuan (China) Qi Baoxiang	(Japan) Kayoko Kawahigashi (Japan) Rie Wada	(China) Liu Yang (China) Zhang Deying

=== Mixed doubles ===
Year	Gold	Silver	Bronze
1976	(Socialist Federal Republic of Yugoslavia) Dragutin Šurbek (Socialist Federal Republic of Yugoslavia) Gordana Perkučin	(Japan) Mizoko Nakamura (Japan) Sachiko Yokota	(China) Guo Yuehua (China) Zhang Li
1976	(Socialist Federal Republic of Yugoslavia) Dragutin Šurbek (Socialist Federal Republic of Yugoslavia) Gordana Perkučin	(Japan) Mizoko Nakamura (Japan) Sachiko Yokota	(Japan) Norio Takashima (Japan) Fumiko Shinpo
1980	(China) Wang Huiyuan (China) Cao Yanhua	(France) Jacques Secrétin (France) Claude Bergeret	(China) Shi Zhihao (China) Liu Yang
1980	(China) Wang Huiyuan (China) Cao Yanhua	(France) Jacques Secrétin (France) Claude Bergeret	(China) Xie Saike (China) Zhang Deying

=== Men's team ===
Year	Gold	Silver	Bronze
1976	Japan	China	Sweden
1980	China	France	Japan

=== Women's team ===
Year	Gold	Silver	Bronze
1976	China	Japan	Sweden
1980	China	Japan	North Korea
