= 1979 World Table Tennis Championships =

1979 edition of the World Table Tennis Championships

The 1979 World Table Tennis Championships were held in Pyongyang from April 25 to May 6, 1979.

== Results ==
=== Team ===
Event	Gold	Silver	Bronze
Swaythling Cup; Men's Team	Hungary; Gábor Gergely; István Jónyer; Tibor Klampár; Tibor Kreisz; János Takács	China; Guo Yuehua; Huang Liang; Li Zhenshi; Liang Geliang; Lu Qiwei	Japan; Hiroyuki Abe; Hideo Gotoh; Masahiro Maehara; Seiji Ono; Norio Takashima
Corbillon Cup; Women's team	China; Cao Yanhua; Ge Xin'ai; Zhang Deying; Zhang Li	North Korea; Hong Gil-Soon; Li Song Suk; Pak Yong-Ok; Pak Yung-Sun	Japan; Kayoko Kawahigashi; Yoshiko Shimauchi; Kayo Sugaya; Shoko Takahashi

=== Individual ===
Event	Gold	Silver	Bronze
Men's singles	(Japan) Seiji Ono	(China) Guo Yuehua	(China) Liang Geliang
Men's singles	(Japan) Seiji Ono	(China) Guo Yuehua	(China) Li Zhenshi
Women's singles	(China) Ge Xin'ai	(North Korea) Li Song Suk	(China) Tong Ling
Women's singles	(China) Ge Xin'ai	(North Korea) Li Song Suk	(China) Zhang Deying
Men's doubles	(Socialist Federal Republic of Yugoslavia) Antun Stipančić (Socialist Federal Republic of Yugoslavia) Dragutin Šurbek	(Hungary) István Jónyer (Hungary) Tibor Klampár	(China) Li Zhenshi (China) Wang Huiyuan
Men's doubles	(Socialist Federal Republic of Yugoslavia) Antun Stipančić (Socialist Federal Republic of Yugoslavia) Dragutin Šurbek	(Hungary) István Jónyer (Hungary) Tibor Klampár	(China) Guo Yuehua (China) Liang Geliang
Women's doubles	(China) Zhang Deying (China) Zhang Li	(China) Ge Xin'ai (China) Yan Guili	(North Korea) Li Song-suk (North Korea) Ro Jong-suk
Women's doubles	(China) Zhang Deying (China) Zhang Li	(China) Ge Xin'ai (China) Yan Guili	(Socialist Federal Republic of Yugoslavia) Erzsebet Palatinus (Socialist Federal Republic of Yugoslavia) Gordana Perkučin
Mixed doubles	(China) Liang Geliang (China) Ge Xin'ai	(China) Li Zhenshi (China) Yan Guili	(China) Wang Huiyuan (China) Zhang Deying
Mixed doubles	(China) Liang Geliang (China) Ge Xin'ai	(China) Li Zhenshi (China) Yan Guili	(France) Jacques Secrétin (France) Claude Bergeret
