= 1979 World Table Tennis Championships – Mixed doubles =

1979 Mixed doubles

The 1979 World Table Tennis Championships mixed doubles was the 35th edition of the mixed doubles championship.

Liang Geliang and Ge Xin'ai defeated Li Zhenshi and Yan Guili in the final by three sets to nil.

== Results ==
Round of 16
(France) Jacques Secrétin (France) Claude Bergeret	3
(Socialist Federal Republic of Yugoslavia) Zoran Kosanović (Socialist Federal Republic of Yugoslavia) Branka Batinić	0
(China) Huang Liang (China) Tong Ling	1
(Japan) Norio Takashima (Japan) Kayoko Kawahigashi	3
(Hungary) István Jónyer (Hungary) Gabriella Szabó	3
(Czechoslovakia) Jindřich Panský (Czechoslovakia) Marie Hrachová	1
(China) Liang Geliang (China) Ge Xin'ai	3
(Netherlands) Bert Van der Helm (Netherlands) Bettine Vriesekoop	0
(China) Li Zhenshi (China) Yan Guili	3
(England) John Hilton (England) Jill Hammersley	1
(North Korea) Cho Yong Ho (North Korea) Pak Yong-ok	3
(Czechoslovakia) Milan Orlowski (Czechoslovakia) Ilona Uhlíková	0
(China) Wang Huiyuan (China) Zhang Deying	3
(Socialist Federal Republic of Yugoslavia) Antun Stipančić (Socialist Federal Republic of Yugoslavia) Erzsebet Palatinus	0
(China) Guo Yuehua (China) Zhang Li	3
(France) Patrick Renverse (France) Nadine Daviaud	0

Quarterfinals
(France) Secrétin (France) Bergeret	3
(Japan) Takashima (Japan) Kawahigashi	2
(Hungary) Jónyer (Hungary) Szabó	9	8	17
(China) Liang Geliang (China) Ge Xin'ai	21	21	21
(China) Liz Zhenshi (China) Yan Guili	13	21	21	21
(North Korea) Cho Yong Ho (North Korea) Pak Yong-ok	21	14	15	16
(China) Wang Huiyuan (China) Zhang Deying	3
(China) Guo Yuehua (China) Zhang Li	1

Semifinals
(France) Secrétin (France) Bergeret	14	11	10
(China) Liang Geliang (China) Ge Xin'ai	21	21	21
(China) Li Zhenshi (China) Yan Guili	21	21	21
(China) Wang Huiyuan (China) Zhang Deying	7	12	13

Final
(China) Liang Geliang (China) Ge Xin'ai	21	21	21
(China) Li Zhenshi (China) Yan Guili	16	16	18

== See also ==
- List of World Table Tennis Championships medalists
