= 1977 World Table Tennis Championships – Men's doubles =

1977 Men's doubles

The 1977 World Table Tennis Championships men's doubles was the 34th edition of the men's doubles championship. Li Chen-shih and Liang Ke-liang won the title after defeating Huang Liang and Lu Yuan-Sheng in the final by three sets to nil.

== Results ==
Round of 16
(China) Lu Yuan-Sheng (China) Huang Liang	13	21	19	21	23
(Hungary) Tibor Klampár (Hungary) István Jónyer	21	16	21	18	21
(England) Desmond Douglas (England) Denis Neale	20	21	21	21
(Japan) Mitsuru Kono (Japan) Tokio Tasaka	22	16	11	19
(China) Kuo Yao-Hua (China) Liao Fu-Min	19	19	21
(United States) Danny Seemiller (United States) Ricky Seemiller	21	21	23
(France) Christian Martin (Japan) Norio Takashima	11	17	13
(Socialist Federal Republic of Yugoslavia) Dragutin Šurbek (Socialist Federal Republic of Yugoslavia) Antun Stipančić	21	21	21
(China) Liang Ke-liang (China) Li Chen-shih	21	21	21
(Czechoslovakia) Josef Dvořáček (Czechoslovakia) Jindřich Panský	10	12	7
(France) Jacques Secrétin (France) Patrick Birocheau	18	21	21	21
(Japan) Katsuyuki Abe (Japan) Masahiro Maehara	21	10	13	17
(Czechoslovakia) Milan Orlowski (Hungary) Gábor Gergely	22	21	17	17	21
(Japan) Tetsuo Inoue (Japan) Isao Nakandare	20	18	21	21	18
(Sweden) Stellan Bengtsson (Sweden) Kjell Johansson	21	22	21	14	21
(Italy) Stefano Bosi (Italy) Roberto Giontella	15	24	13	21	7

Quarterfinals
(China) Lu Yuan-Sheng (China) Huang Liang	21	21	21
(England) Douglas (England) Neale	4	18	10
(United States) Seemiller D (United States) Seemiller R	19	12	8
(Socialist Federal Republic of Yugoslavia) Šurbek (Socialist Federal Republic of Yugoslavia) Stipančić	21	21	21
(China) Liang Ke-liang (China) Li Chen-shih	21	16	18	21	21
(France) Secrétin (France) Birocheau	19	21	21	18	14
(Czechoslovakia) Orlowski (Hungary) Gergely	18	21	20	20
(Sweden) Bengtsson (Sweden) Johansson	21	16	22	22

Semifinals
(China) Lu Yuan-Sheng (China) Huang Liang	21	21	21
(Socialist Federal Republic of Yugoslavia) Stipančić (Socialist Federal Republic of Yugoslavia) Šurbek	16	14	16
(China) Liang Ke-liang (China) Li Chen-shih	13	21	21	21
(Sweden) Bengtsson (Sweden) Johansson	21	17	18	17

Final
(China) Lu Yuan-Sheng (China) Huang Liang	20	18	11
(China) Liang Ke-liang (China) Li Chen-shih	22	21	21

== See also ==
List of World Table Tennis Championships medalists
