= 1979 World Table Tennis Championships – Men's team =

1979 Swaythling Cup (men's team)

The 1979 World Table Tennis Championships – Swaythling Cup (men's team) was the 35th edition of the men's team championship.

Hungary won the gold medal defeating China 5–1 in the final. Japan won the bronze medal.

== Medalists ==
Event	Gold	Silver	Bronze
	Hungary; Gábor Gergely; István Jónyer; Tibor Klampár; Tibor Kreisz; János Takács	China; Guo Yuehua; Huang Liang; Li Zhenshi; Liang Geliang; Lu Qiwei	Japan; Hiroyuki Abe; Hideo Gotoh; Masahiro Maehara; Seiji Ono; Norio Takashima

== Swaythling Cup tables ==
=== Group A ===
Pos	Team	P	W	L	Pts
1	Hungary	8	8	0	8
2	China	8	7	1	7
3	France	8	5	3	5
4	South Korea	8	5	3	5
5	(Socialist Federal Republic of Yugoslavia) Yugoslavia	8	4	4	4
6	West Germany	8	4	4	4
7	Poland	8	2	6	1
8	United States	8	1	7	0
9	Romania	8	0	8	0

=== Group B ===
Pos	Team	P	W	L	Pts
1	Czechoslovakia	7	7	0	7
2	Japan	7	6	1	6
3	Soviet Union	7	4	3	4
4	Sweden	7	4	3	4
5	England	7	3	4	3
6	Australia	7	2	5	2
7	Denmark	7	2	5	2
8	Hong Kong	7	0	7	0

== Semifinals ==
Team One	Team Two	Score
Japan	Hungary	1–5
China	Czechoslovakia	5–2

== Third-place play off ==
Team One	Team Two	Score
Japan	Czechoslovakia	5–3

== Final ==
Hungary 5		China 1	Score
Gergely	bt	Guo Yuehua	21–10 21–18
Jónyer	bt	Lu Qiwei	21–12 21–19
Klampár	bt	Li Zhenshi	21–17 21–11
Jónyer	lost to	Guo Yuehua	21–17 19–21 19–21
Gergely	bt	Li Zhenshi	13–21 21–9 21–17
Klampár	bt	Lu Qiwei	17–21 21–10 21–11

== See also ==
List of World Table Tennis Championships medalists
