= 1981 World Table Tennis Championships – Men's team =

1981 Swaythling Cup (men's team)

The 1981 World Table Tennis Championships – Swaythling Cup (men's team) was the 36th edition of the men's team championship.

China won the gold medal defeating Hungary 5–2 in the final. Japan won the bronze medal.

== Medalists ==
Event	Gold	Silver	Bronze
	China; Cai Zhenhua; Guo Yuehua; Shi Zhihao; Wang Huiyuan; Xie Saike	Hungary; Gábor Gergely; István Jónyer; Tibor Klampár; Tibor Kreisz; Zsolt Kriston	Japan; Hiroyuki Abe; Hideo Gotoh; Masahiro Maehara; Seiji Ono; Norio Takashima

== Swaythling Cup tables ==
=== Group A ===
Pos	Team	P	W	L	Pts
1	China	7	7	0	7
2	Japan	7	5	2	5
3	England	7	4	3	4
4	South Korea	7	4	3	4
5	France	7	4	3	4
6	Sweden	7	3	4	3
7	West Germany	7	1	6	1
8	Indonesia	7	0	7	0

=== Group B ===
Pos	Team	P	W	L	Pts
1	Hungary	7	7	0	7
2	Czechoslovakia	7	5	2	5
3	(Socialist Federal Republic of Yugoslavia) Yugoslavia	7	5	2	5
4	Poland	7	5	2	5
5	North Korea	7	3	4	3
6	Italy	7	2	5	2
7	Soviet Union	7	1	6	1
8	Australia	7	0	7	0

== Semifinals ==
Team One	Team Two	Score
Japan	Hungary	1–5
China	Czechoslovakia	5–0

== Third-place playoff ==
Team One	Team Two	Score
Japan	Czechoslovakia	5–1

== Final ==
China 5		Hungary 2	Score
Shi Zhihao	lost to	Jónyer	17–21 21–23
Xie Saike	bt	Jónyer	21–15 21–19
Cai Zhenhua	bt	Klampár	21–17 22–24 22–20
Shi Zhihao	lost to	Klampár	21–13 17–21 19–21
Xie Saike	bt	Klampár	15–21 21–16 21–15
Xie Saike	bt	Gergely	21–17 22–24 22–20
Cai Zhenhua	bt	Gergely	21–16 14–21 21–15

== See also ==
- List of World Table Tennis Championships medalists
