= 1981 World Table Tennis Championships – Men's doubles =

1981 Men's doubles

The 1981 World Table Tennis Championships men's doubles was the 36th edition of the men's doubles championship. Li Zhenshi and Cai Zhenhua won the title after defeating Xie Saike and Guo Yuehua in the final by three sets to one.

== Results ==
Round of 16
(Socialist Federal Republic of Yugoslavia) Dragutin Šurbek (Socialist Federal Republic of Yugoslavia) Antun Stipancic	21	21	21
(United States) Danny Seemiller (United States) Ricky Seemiller	12	9	9
(Japan) Norio Takashima (Japan) Hideo Gotoh	21	20	21	21	21
(Hungary) Gábor Gergely (Czechoslovakia) Milan Orlowski	14	22	13	11	18
(Poland) Andrzej Grubba (Poland) Leszek Kucharski	21	21	22
(Nigeria) Sunday Eboh (Nigeria) Francis Sule	17	17	20
(West Germany) Peter Stellwag (West Germany) Jurgen Rebel	17	14	12
(China) Li Zhenshi (China) Cai Zhenhua	21	21	21
(France) Jacques Secrétin (France) Patrick Birocheau	21	21	13	24
(Poland) Stefan Dryszel (Poland) Andrzej Jakubowicz	9	12	21	22
(Romania) Șerban Doboși (Romania) Simion Crisan	18	16	21	11
(Sweden) Stellan Bengtsson (Sweden) Ulf "Tickan" Carlsson	21	21	15	21
(China) Xie Saike (China) Guo Yuehua	21	21	21
(England) Desmond Douglas (England) Paul Day	11	15	17
(Japan) Naoki Hayashi (Japan) Hitoshi Kaihoko	16	21	21	20	21
(Hungary) Tibor Klampár (Hungary) István Jónyer	21	19	18	22	19

Quarterfinals
(Socialist Federal Republic of Yugoslavia) Stipancic (Socialist Federal Republic of Yugoslavia) Šurbek	21	21	21
(Japan) Takashima (Japan) Gotoh	19	13	14
(Poland) Grubba (Poland) Kucharski	12	17	25	19
(China) Li Zhenshi (China) Cai Zhenhua	21	21	23	21
(France) Secrétin (France) Birocheau	21	21	21
(Sweden) Bengtsson (Sweden) Carlsson	15	14	19
(China) Xi Saike (China) Guo Yuehua	22	21	21	21
(Japan) Hayashi (Japan) Kaihoko	24	11	7	18

Semifinals
(Socialist Federal Republic of Yugoslavia) Stipancic (Socialist Federal Republic of Yugoslavia) Šurbek	21	14	15	13
(China) Li Zhenshi (China) Cai Zhenhua	13	21	21	21
(France) Secrétin (France) Birocheau	10	21	18	21	8
(China) Xi Saike (China) Guo Yuehua	21	18	21	15	21

Final
(China) Li Zhenshi (China) Cai Zhenhua	21	21	19	21
(China) Xi Saike (China) Guo Yuehua	17	16	21	11

== See also ==
List of World Table Tennis Championships medalists
