= 1979 World Table Tennis Championships – Women's doubles =

1979 Women's doubles

The 1979 World Table Tennis Championships women's doubles was the 34th edition of the women's doubles championship. Zhang Li and Zhang Deying defeated Ge Xin'ai and Yan Guili in the final by three sets to nil.

== Results ==
Round of 16
(North Korea) Pak Yong-ok (China) Yang Ying	0
(Japan) Kayo Sugaya (Japan) Yoshiko Shimauchi	3
(Netherlands) Bettine Vriesekoop (Netherlands) Marianne Der Vliet	2
(Socialist Federal Republic of Yugoslavia) Gordana Perkučin (Socialist Federal Republic of Yugoslavia) Erzsébet Palatinus	3
(Sweden) Ann-Christin Hellman (Sweden) Marie Lindblad	2
(Czechoslovakia) Marie Hrachová (Czechoslovakia) Dana Dubinova	3
(Soviet Union) Valentina Popova (Soviet Union) Narine Antonjan	1
(China) Ge Xin'ai (China) Yan Guili	3
(Hungary) Judit Magos (Hungary) Gabriella Szabó	3
(Republic of Ireland) Karen Senior (Republic of Ireland) Alice Leonard	0
(North Korea) Ro Jong-suk (North Korea) Li Song-suk	3
(Romania) Maria Alexandru (China) Wei Lijie	2
(Czechoslovakia) Ilona Uhlíková (Czechoslovakia) Blanka Silhanova	2
(China) Tong Ling (China) Cao Yanhua	3
(United States) Alice Green (United States) Kasia Davidowicz	0
(China) Zhang Li (China) Zhang Deying	3

Quarterfinals
(Japan) Sugaya (Japan) Shimauchi	2
(Socialist Federal Republic of Yugoslavia) Perkučin (Socialist Federal Republic of Yugoslavia) Palatinus	3
(Sweden) Hellman (Sweden) Lindblad	1
(China) Ge Xin'ai (China) Yan Guili	3
(Hungary) Magos (Hungary) Szabó	1
(North Korea) Ro Jong-suk (North Korea) Li Song-suk	3
(China) Tong Ling (China) Cao Yanhua	0
(China) Zhang Li (China) Zhang Deying	3

Semifinals
(Socialist Federal Republic of Yugoslavia) Perkučin (Socialist Federal Republic of Yugoslavia) Palatinus	2
(China) Ge Xin'ai (China) Yan Guili	3
(North Korea) Ro Jong-suk (North Korea) Li Song-suk	1
(China) Zhang Li (China) Zhang Deying	3

Final
(China) Ge Xin'ai (China) Yan Guili	13	14	16
(China) Zhang Li (China) Zhang Deying	21	21	21

== See also ==
List of World Table Tennis Championships medalists
