= 1979 World Table Tennis Championships – Men's doubles =

1979 Men's doubles

The 1979 World Table Tennis Championships men's doubles was the 35th edition of the men's doubles championship. Dragutin Šurbek and Antun Stipančić won the title after defeating István Jónyer and Tibor Klampár in the final by three sets to nil.

== Results ==
Round of 16
(China) Guo Yuehua (China) Liang Geliang	21	21	21
(United States) Danny Seemiller (United States) Ricky Seemiller	6	17	7
(France) Jacques Secrétin (France) Patrick Birocheau	19	21	21	21
(Czechoslovakia) Josef Dvořáček (Czechoslovakia) Jindřich Panský	21	9	11	7
(West Germany) Jochen Leiss (West Germany) Peter Stellwag	17	21	21	21
(Romania) Simion Crișan (Romania) Șerban Doboși	21	10	12	15
(Hungary) Tibor Klampár (Hungary) István Jónyer	21	21	21	24
(England) Desmond Douglas (England) Nicky Jarvis	18	17	16	22
(Socialist Federal Republic of Yugoslavia) Dragutin Šurbek (Socialist Federal Republic of Yugoslavia) Antun Stipančić	21	21	21
(North Korea) Kim Do Won (North Korea) U Yong Chol	17	9	3
(France) Christian Martin (Hungary) Tibor Kreisz	21	18	21	23
(Japan) Hideo Goto (Japan) Norio Takashima	13	21	18	21
(Czechoslovakia) Milan Orlowski (Hungary) Gábor Gergely	22	19	25	8	21
(Poland) Ryszard Czochanski (Poland) Andrzej Grubba	20	21	23	21	23
(China) Li Zhenshi (China) Wang Huiyuan	21	21	21
(West Germany) Engelbert Hüging (Soviet Union) Igor Solopov	12	13	11

Quarterfinals
(China) Guo Yuehua (China) Liang Geliang	19	21	21	19	21
(France) Secrétin (France) Birocheau	21	17	18	21	16
(West Germany) Leiss (West Germany) Stellwag	21	11	17	18
(Hungary) Klampár (Hungary) Jónyer	17	21	21	21
(Socialist Federal Republic of Yugoslavia) Stipančić (Socialist Federal Republic of Yugoslavia) Šurbek	21	21	21
(Hungary) Kreisz (France) Martin	16	13	12
(Poland) Czochanski (Poland) Grubba	21	12	8	10
(China) Li Zhenshi (China) Wang Huiyuan	14	21	21	21

Semifinals
(China) Guo Yuehua (China) Liang Geliang	14	21	12	12
(Hungary) Klampár (Hungary) Jónyer	21	18	21	21
(Socialist Federal Republic of Yugoslavia) Stipančić (Socialist Federal Republic of Yugoslavia) Šurbek	21	30	22
(China) Li Zhenshi (China) Wang Huiyuan	18	28	20

Final
(Hungary) Klampár (Hungary) Jónyer	18	20	16
(Socialist Federal Republic of Yugoslavia) Stipančić (Socialist Federal Republic of Yugoslavia) Šurbek	21	22	21

== See also ==
List of World Table Tennis Championships medalists
