= Asian-African-Latin American Table Tennis Invitational Tournament =

Five table tennis tournaments held in 1971–1980

The Asian-African-Latin American Table Tennis Invitational Tournament (formerly named Asian-African Table Tennis Invitational Tournament in 1971, renamed Asian-African-Latin American Table Tennis Invitational Tournament since 1973) were five table tennis tournaments held in 1971, 1973, 1975, 1976 and 1980.

== Winners ==
| Year | Team | | Singles | | Doubles | | |
| Year | Men's | Women's | Men's | Women's | Men's | Women's | Mixed |
|---|---|---|---|---|---|---|---|
| 1971; Beijing | Japan | China | (Japan) Nobuhiko Hasegawa | (China) Zheng Huaiying | (China) Diao Wenyuan (China) Li Jingguang | (Japan) Yasuko Konno (Japan) Yukie Ozeki | (North Korea) Pak Sin-il (North Korea) Pak Yong-ok |
| 1973; Beijing | China | China | (Japan) Yujiro Imano | (North Korea) Pak Yong-ok | (Japan) Yujiro Imano (Japan) Tokio Tasaka | (North Korea) Kim Chang-ae (North Korea) Pak Yung-sun | (China) Xi Enting (China) Zhang Li |
| 1975; Lagos | China | China | (China) Liang Geliang | (China) Zhang Li | (Japan) Katsuyuki Abe (Japan) Mitsuru Kono | (North Korea) Cha Kyung-mi (North Korea) Pak Yong-ok | (Japan) Mitsuru Kono (Japan) Yukie Ozeki |
| 1976; Mexico City | China | China | (China) Guo Yuehua | (China) Zhang Li | (Japan) Katsuyuki Abe (Japan) Mitsuru Kono | (Japan) Yukie Ozeki (Japan) Sachiko Yokota | (Japan) Kinji Koyama (Japan) Teruko Kuroko |
| 1980; Tokyo | China | China | (China) Li Zhenshi | (China) Cao Yanhua | (Japan) Hiroyuki Abe (Japan) Seiji Ono | (China) Geng Lijuan (China) Qi Baoxiang | (Japan) Norio Takashima (Japan) Kayoko Kawahigashi |
