= 1979 World Table Tennis Championships – Men's singles =

1979 Men's singles

The 1979 World Table Tennis Championships men's singles was the 35th edition of the men's singles championship.

Seiji Ono defeated Guo Yuehua in the final after Yuehua was forced to retire during the fourth set due to leg cramps.

== Results ==
Round of 16
(China) Guo Yuehua	25	23	21
(Socialist Federal Republic of Yugoslavia) Dragutin Šurbek	23	21	19
(Japan) Norio Takashima	13	22	23	21
(Hungary) János Takács	21	20	21	17
(China) Li Zhenshi	21	15	29	21
(Japan) Hideo Gotoh	11	21	27	17
(Hungary) Gábor Gergely	19	21	24	18	22
(China) Shi Zhihao	21	9	22	21	20
(China) Lu Yaohua	21	21	13	21
(Hungary) Tibor Klampár	15	16	21	12
(Japan) Seiji Ono	21	21	13	25
(China) Huang Liang	16	16	21	23
(Czech Republic) Josef Dvoracek	17	23	21	21
(England) Desmond Douglas	21	21	10	7
(China) Liang Geliang	21	21	21
(Hungary) István Jónyer	18	18	17

Quarterfinals
(China) Yuehua	21	21	21
(Japan) Takashima	15	14	17
(China) Zhenshi	22	21	21	21
(Hungary) Gergely	20	10	14	17
(China) Lu Yaohua	18	21	18	21	16
(Japan) Ono	21	13	21	18	21
(Czechoslovakia) Dvoracek	9	18	17
(China) Liang Geliang	21	21	21

Semifinals
(China) Guo Yuehua	21	21	17	21
(China) Li Zhenshi	17	16	21	15
(Japan) Ono	13	21	21	12	21
(China) Liang Geliang	21	19	15	21	15

Final
(China) Guo Yuehua	23	17	21	1+
(Japan) Ono	25	21	18	2

+ retired injured

== See also ==
- List of World Table Tennis Championships medalists
