= Table tennis at the 1978 Asian Games =

- Dates: 10–19 December 1978

Table tennis was contested at the 1978 Asian Games in Bangkok, Thailand.

Table tennis had team, doubles and singles events for men and women, as well as a mixed doubles competition.

== Medalists ==
Event	Gold	Silver	Bronze
Men's singles	Liang Geliang; China	Guo Yuehua; China	Jo Yong-ho; North Korea
Men's singles	Liang Geliang; China	Guo Yuehua; China	Norio Takashima; Japan
Men's doubles	China; Guo Yuehua; Huang Tongsheng	Indonesia; Empie Wuisan; Sinyo Supit	China; Liang Geliang; Chen Xinhua
Men's doubles	China; Guo Yuehua; Huang Tongsheng	Indonesia; Empie Wuisan; Sinyo Supit	South Korea; Yoon Kil-jung; Park Lee-hee
Men's team	China; Chen Xinhua; Guo Yuehua; Huang Tongsheng; Liang Geliang	Japan; Hiroyuki Abe; Ichiro Hoshino; Masahiro Maehara; Norio Takashima	North Korea; Hong Chol; Jo Yong-ho; Ri Song-taek; Yun Chol
Women's singles	Zhang Li; China	Zhang Deying; China	Kim Soon-ok; South Korea
Women's singles	Zhang Li; China	Zhang Deying; China	Kumiko Nagahara; Japan
Women's doubles	China; Zhang Li; Zhang Deying	Hong Kong; Hui So Hung; Chang Siu Ying	Japan; Kumiko Nagahara; Keiko Komuro
Women's doubles	China; Zhang Li; Zhang Deying	Hong Kong; Hui So Hung; Chang Siu Ying	China; Cao Yanhua; Yang Ying
Women's team	China; Cao Yanhua; Yang Ying; Zhang Deying; Zhang Li	South Korea; Kim Soon-ok; Lee Ki-won; Lee Soo-ja; Park Hong-ja	Japan; Ryoko Chiba; Keiko Komuro; Kumiko Nagahara; Fumiko Shinpo
Mixed doubles	China; Guo Yuehua; Zhang Li	China; Liang Geliang; Zhang Deying	South Korea; Lee Sang-kuk; Lee Ki-won
Mixed doubles	China; Guo Yuehua; Zhang Li	China; Liang Geliang; Zhang Deying	South Korea; Yoon Kil-jung; Kim Soon-ok

== Medal table ==
Rank	Nation	Gold	Silver	Bronze	Total
1	China (CHN)	7	3	2	12
2	Japan (JPN)	0	1	4	5
2	South Korea (KOR)	0	1	4	5
4	Hong Kong (HKG)	0	1	0	1
4	Indonesia (INA)	0	1	0	1
6	North Korea (PRK)	0	0	2	2
Totals (6 entries)		7	7	12	26
