= 1976 Asian Table Tennis Championships =

- Date: 26 April – 7 May 1976
- Edition: 3rd
- Location: Pyongyang, North Korea

Champions

Men's singles
- (China) Liang Geliang

Women's singles
- (China) Zhang Li

Men's doubles
- (Japan) Tetsuo Inoue / (Japan) Mitsuru Kohno

Women's doubles
- (North Korea) Kim Chang-ae / (North Korea) Pak Yong-ok

Mixed doubles
- (Japan) Tetsuo Inoue / (Japan) Mitsuko Shimamoto

Men's team
- North Korea

Women's team
- China
- Asian Table Tennis Championships

The 3rd Asian Table Tennis Championships 1976 were held in Pyongyang, North Korea, from 26 April to 7 May 1976. It was organised by the Table Tennis Association of the Democratic People's Republic of Korea under the authority of Asian Table Tennis Union (ATTU) and International Table Tennis Federation (ITTF).

== Medal summary ==
=== Medal table ===
* Host nation (North Korea)

Rank	Nation	Gold	Silver	Bronze	Total
1	China	3	6	4	13
2	North Korea*	2	1	2	5
3	Japan	2	0	5	7
4	India	0	0	1	1
Totals (4 entries)		7	7	12	26

=== Events ===
Event	Gold	Silver	Bronze
Men's singles	(China) Liang Geliang	(China) Guo Yuehua	(China) Li Peng
Men's singles	(China) Liang Geliang	(China) Guo Yuehua	(Japan) Norio Takashima
Women's singles	(China) Zhang Li	(China) Zhang Deying	(China) Ge Xin'ai
Women's singles	(China) Zhang Li	(China) Zhang Deying	(North Korea) Pak Yung-sun
Men's doubles	(Japan) Tetsuo Inoue (Japan) Mitsuru Kohno	(China) Li Zhenshi (China) Liang Geliang	(India) Manjit Singh Dua (India) Vilas Menon
Men's doubles	(Japan) Tetsuo Inoue (Japan) Mitsuru Kohno	(China) Li Zhenshi (China) Liang Geliang	(North Korea) Cho Yong-ho (North Korea) Yun Chol
Women's doubles	(North Korea) Kim Chang-ae (North Korea) Pak Yong-ok	(China) Zhang Deying (China) Zhang Li	(Japan) Tomie Edano (Japan) Teruko Kuroko
Women's doubles	(North Korea) Kim Chang-ae (North Korea) Pak Yong-ok	(China) Zhang Deying (China) Zhang Li	(Japan) Mitsuko Shimamoto (Japan) Sachiko Yokota
Mixed doubles	(Japan) Tetsuo Inoue (Japan) Mitsuko Shimamoto	(China) Liang Geliang (China) Ge Xin'ai	(China) Li Peng (China) Zhang Kangmei
Mixed doubles	(Japan) Tetsuo Inoue (Japan) Mitsuko Shimamoto	(China) Liang Geliang (China) Ge Xin'ai	(China) Li Zhenshi (China) Zhang Deying
Men's team	North Korea	China	Japan
Women's team	China	North Korea	Japan

== See also ==
- World Table Tennis Championships
- Asian Cup
