= 1979 World Table Tennis Championships – Women's team =

1979 Corbillon Cup (women's team)

The 1979 World Table Tennis Championships – Corbillon Cup (women's team) was the 28th edition of the women's team championship.

China won the gold medal defeating North Korea 3–0 in the final, Japan won the bronze medal.

== Medalists ==
Event	Gold	Silver	Bronze
	China; Cao Yanhua; Ge Xin'ai; Zhang Deying; Zhang Li	North Korea; Hong Gil-Soon; Li Song Suk; Pak Yong-Ok; Pak Yung-Sun	Japan; Kayoko Kawahigashi; Yoshiko Shimauchi; Kayo Sugaya; Shoko Takahashi

== Final tables ==
=== Group A ===
Pos	Team	P	W	L	Pts
1	China	8	8	0	8
2	Japan	8	7	1	7
3	Hungary	8	6	2	6
4	Sweden	8	5	3	5
5	Hong Kong	8	4	4	3
6	Romania	8	3	5	3
7	France	8	2	6	3
8	Netherlands	8	1	7	1
9	Poland	8	0	8	0

=== Group B ===
Pos	Team	P	W	L	Pts
1	North Korea	7	6	1	6
2	Soviet Union	7	6	1	6
3	Czechoslovakia	7	5	2	5
4	(Socialist Federal Republic of Yugoslavia) Yugoslavia	7	4	3	4
5	England	7	3	4	3
6	West Germany	7	3	4	3
7	United States	7	2	5	2
8	Bulgaria	7	1	6	1

== Third Place Play Off ==
Team One	Team Two	Score
Japan	Soviet Union	3–1

== Final ==
China 3		North Korea 1	Score
Ge Xin'ai	lost to	Pak Yung-Sun	21–18 21–18
Zhang Deying	bt	Pak Yong-Ok	21–13 21–19
Zhang Deying & Zhang Li	bt	Hong Gil-Soon & Pak Yung-Sun	21–17 21–17
Zhang Deying	bt	Pak Yung-Sun	21–10 16–21 21–18

== See also ==
List of World Table Tennis Championships medalists
