= Table Tennis World Masters =

The Table Tennis World Masters or Table Tennis Norwich Union Masters was held annually between 1979 and 1984. The competitions were sanctioned by Norwich Union. Like the early years of the Table Tennis World Cup, There had been only men's singles competition in the tournament.

== Winners ==
=== Men's singles ===
Year	Host City	Gold	Silver	Bronze
1979	Milton Keynes	(Socialist Federal Republic of Yugoslavia) Dragutin Šurbek	(China) Li Zhenshi	(China) Shi Zhihao
1980	Preston	(Hungary) Tibor Klampár	(Czechoslovakia) Milan Orlowski	(England) Desmond Douglas
1981	Hong Kong	(China) Guo Yuehua	(Hungary) István Jónyer	(Czechoslovakia) Milan Orlowski
1982	Toronto	(Japan) Seiji Ono	(South Korea) Park Lee-hee	(Sweden) Mikael Appelgren
1983	Kingston	(China) Wang Huiyuan	(Hong Kong) Chiu Man Kuen	(China) Jiang Jialiang
1984	Hong Kong	(China) He Zhiwen	(China) Xie Saike	(Sweden) Ulf Bengtsson
1985	United States of America	(United States) Chris Whiting	(China) Xie Saike	(Sweden) Ulf Bengtsson
