= 1975 World Table Tennis Championships – Men's singles =

1975 Men's singles

The 1975 World Table Tennis Championships men's singles was the 33rd edition of the men's singles championship.

István Jónyer defeated Antun Stipančić in the final, winning three sets to two to secure the title.

== Results ==
Round of 16
(China) Hsi En-ting	21	21	21
(Hungary) Gábor Gergely	11	9	18
(Socialist Federal Republic of Yugoslavia) Antun Stipančić	21	21	21
(England) Trevor Taylor	19	17	18
(Japan) Norio Takashima	23	21	19	21
(France) Jacques Secrétin	21	6	21	18
(Sweden) Kjell Johansson	21	21	12	21
(China) Liang Ko-Liang	17	17	21	17
(Soviet Union) Sarkis Sarchayan	21	21	24
(East Germany) Jochen Liess	7	13	22
(Hungary) István Jónyer	21	14	21	21
(China) Li Peng	12	21	16	10
(Sweden) Stellan Bengtsson	21	19	21	16	10
(Japan) Mitsuru Kono	18	21	18	21	21
(China) Hsu Shao-Fa	21	19	16	21	19
(Socialist Federal Republic of Yugoslavia) Dragutin Šurbek	16	21	21	18	21

Quarterfinals
(China) En-ting	8	23	23	7	17
(Socialist Federal Republic of Yugoslavia) Stipančić	21	21	21	21	21
(Japan) Takashima	21	25	21	21
(Sweden) Johansson	18	23	23	12
(Soviet Union) Sarkhayan	19	16	21	20
(Hungary) Jónyer	21	21	16	22
(Japan) Kono	21	21	21
(Socialist Federal Republic of Yugoslavia) Šurbek	7	10	18

Semifinals
(Socialist Federal Republic of Yugoslavia) Stipančić	21	21	20	19	21
(Japan) Takashima	10	6	22	21	13
(Hungary) Jónyer	21	21	25
(Japan) Kono	13	15	23

Final
(Socialist Federal Republic of Yugoslavia) Stipančić	21	21	14	15	19
(Hungary) Jónyer	17	12	21	21	21

== See also ==
List of World Table Tennis Championships medalists
