= 1979 World Table Tennis Championships – Women's singles =

1979 Women's singles

The 1979 World Table Tennis Championships women's singles was the 35th edition of the women's singles championship. Ge Xin'ai defeated Li Song Suk in the final by three sets to nil, to win the title.

== Results ==
Round of 16
(North Korea) Pak Yung-sun	21	21	21
(Japan) Shoko Takahashi	8	17	14
(China) Tong Ling	21	21	21
(Japan) Yoshiko Shimauchi	13	15	15
(Hungary) Gabriella Szabo	16	21	21	21
(England) Jill Hammersley	21	15	16	16
(China) Ge Xin'ai	21	21	20	21
(Sweden) Ann-Christin Hellman	17	6	22	15
(China) Zhang Deying	21	21	21
(Japan) Kayoko Kawahigashi	10	9	11
(Soviet Union) Valentina Popova	21	16	21	9	21
(Netherlands) Bettine Vriesekoop	9	21	8	21	17
(North Korea) Li Song Suk	21	21	21
(Hungary) Judit Magos	10	9	11
(China) Zhang Li	21	21	21
(Czechoslovakia) Ilona Uhlíková	19	7	17

Quarterfinals
(North Korea) Pak Yung-sun	21	22	15	16	15
(China) Tong Ling	8	20	21	21	21
(Hungary) Szabo	12	19	17
(China) Ge Xinai	21	21	21
(China) Zhang Deying	21	21	18	21
(Soviet Union) Popova	18	14	21	13
(North Korea) Li Song Suk	21	17	21	21
(China) Zhang Li	13	21	11	13

Semifinals
(China) Tong Ling	16	16	14
(China) Ge Xinai	21	21	21
(China) Zhang Deying	21	21	14	14	16
(North Korea) Li Song Suk	13	13	21	21	21

Final
(China) Ge Xinai	21	21	21
(North Korea) Li Song Suk	10	16	19

== See also ==
- List of World Table Tennis Championships medalists
