= 1983 World Table Tennis Championships – Men's singles =

1983 Men's singles

The 1983 World Table Tennis Championships men's singles was the 37th edition of the men's singles championship.

Guo Yuehua defeated Cai Zhenhua in the final, winning three sets to one to secure the title.

== Results ==
Round of 16
(China) Guo Yuehua	21	21	21
(United States) Eric Boggan	19	14	16
(China) Fan Changmao	21	21	21
(South Korea) Park Leehee	19	8	6
(China) Jiang Jialiang	21	21	21	21
(Socialist Federal Republic of Yugoslavia) Zoran Kalinić	23	7	11	17
(China) Chen Xinhua	21	21	21
(Hungary) István Jónyer	14	17	18
(South Korea) Kim Ki-taik	21	21	21	17	21
(Socialist Federal Republic of Yugoslavia) Dragutin Šurbek	17	23	10	21	16
(China) Wang Huiyuan	21	21	22
(Sweden) Jan-Ove Waldner	18	13	20
(Sweden) Ulf Carlsson	16	14	16
(Japan) Kiyoshi Saito	21	21	21
(China) Cai Zhenhua	16	25	16	26	23
(Sweden) Erik Lindh	21	23	21	24	21

Quarterfinals
(China) Guo Yuehua	21	22	16	21
(China) Fan Changmao	17	20	21	10
(China) Jiang Jialiang	21	21	21	21	21
(China) Chen Xinhua	23	15	23	19	17
(South Korea) Kim Ki-taik	9	12	12
(China) Wang Huiyuan	21	21	21
(Japan) Saito	21	18	13	15
(China) Cai Zhenhua	23	21	21	21

Semifinals
(China) Guo Yuehua	21	17	25	17	21
(China) Jiang Jialiang	17	21	23	21	17
(China) Wang Huiyuan	21	12	11	23
(China) Cai Zhenhua	16	21	21	25

Final
(China) Guo Yuehua	21	19	21	21
(China) Cai Zhenhua	15	21	18	18

== See also ==
- List of World Table Tennis Championships medalists
