= Lu Qiwei =

Chinese table tennis player

Lu Qiwei (Lu Chi-wei)
Personal information
- Nationality: China
- Born: 1957 (age 68–69)
Medal record
Representing China
World Table Tennis Championships
Silver medal – second place	1979	Men's Team

Lu Qiwei (born 1957) also Lu Chi-wei is a male former international table tennis player from China.

He won a silver medal at the 1979 World Table Tennis Championships in the Swaythling Cup (men's team event) with Guo Yuehua, Huang Liang, Li Zhenshi and Liang Geliang for China.

He represented China in the final of the Swaythling Cup when playing in Pyongyang on 30 April 1979, but was defeated by Hungarians Istvan Jonyer and Tibor Klampár in his two matches during the team's 5–1 defeat.

== See also ==
- List of table tennis players
- List of World Table Tennis Championships medalists
