= János Takács =

Hungarian table tennis player (1954–2025)

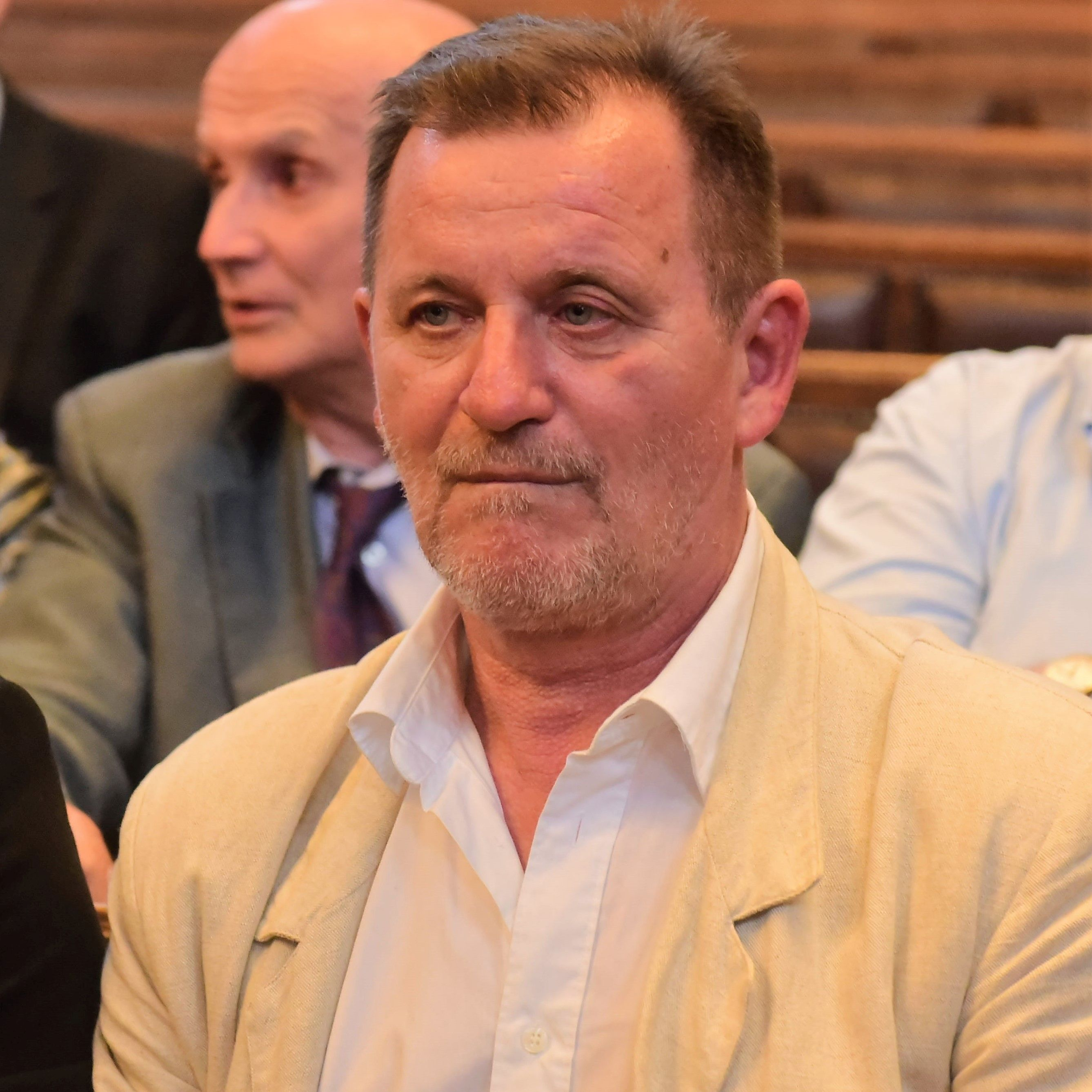

Personal information
- Nationality: Hungary
- Born: 5 December 1954 Budapest, Hungary
- Died: 2 September 2025 (aged 70) Budapest, Hungary
Medal record
Men's table tennis
Representing Hungary
World Table Tennis Championships
Gold medal – first place	1979 Pyongyang	Men's team

János Takács (5 December 1954 – 2 September 2025) was a Hungarian international table tennis player.

Takács won a gold medal at the 1979 World Table Tennis Championships in the Swaythling Cup (men's team event) with Gábor Gergely, István Jónyer, Tibor Klampár, and Tibor Kreisz for Hungary.

Takács died in Budapest, Hungary on 2 September 2025, at the age of 70.

== See also ==
- List of table tennis players
- List of World Table Tennis Championships medalists
