= Hong Gil-soon =

North Korean table tennis player

Hong Gil-Soon
Personal information
- Nationality: North Korea
- Born: 홍길순
Medal record
Representing North Korea
World Table Tennis Championships
Silver medal – second place	1979	women's team

Hong Gil-Soon is a former international table tennis player from North Korea.

== Table tennis career ==
She won a silver medal at the 1979 World Table Tennis Championships in the Corbillon Cup (women's team event) with Li Song Suk, Pak Yong-Ok and Pak Yung-Sun for North Korea.

== See also ==
- List of World Table Tennis Championships medalists
