= Welcome March =

Song by Central Military Band of the People's Liberation Army of China
- Released: 1971
- Songwriter: Wei Qun

"Welcome March" (Chinese: 欢迎进行曲) is the entrance music of Chinese leaders created by the Central Military Band of the People's Liberation Army of China and written by Wei Qun.

== History ==
The march, composed in 1971 by Wu Guangrui and Jia Shuang, was used for the 1971 Asian-African Table Tennis Invitational Tournament held in Beijing. The music often appears in Chinese diplomatic activities and various welcoming occasions. "Welcome March" was played at the opening and closing ceremonies of the 2008 Beijing Olympic Games and the anniversary celebrations of the People's Republic of China.
