= Yang Ying =

Yang Ying may refer to:

- Yang Longyan (897–920), born Yang Ying (楊瀛), ruler of the Five Dynasties and Ten Kingdoms period state Wu
- Yang Ying (curler) (born 1994), Chinese female curler
- Yang Ying (table tennis, born 1953), retired Chinese women's table tennis player
- Yang Ying (table tennis, born 1977), retired Chinese women's table tennis player
- Angelababy (Yang Ying, born 1989), Hong Kong-Chinese actress, model and singer
