= Ernst Gomolla =

German table tennis player

Personal information
- Nationality: Germany
- Born: 7 April 1935 (age 91) Bytom, Poland
Medal record
Representing West Germany
World Table Tennis Championships
Bronze medal – third place	1963	Men's Team

Ernst Gomolla is a male former international table tennis player from Germany.

He won a bronze medal at the 1963 World Table Tennis Championships in the Swaythling Cup (men's team event) with Eric Arndt, Dieter Michalek, Eberhard Schöler and Elmar Stegmann.

His twin brother Herbert Gomolla also represented Germany at table tennis.

== See also ==
- List of table tennis players
- List of World Table Tennis Championships medalists
