= Hideo Gotoh =

Japanese table tennis player

Personal information
- Nationality: Japan
Medal record
Representing Japan
World Table Tennis Championships
Bronze medal – third place	1979	Men's Team
Bronze medal – third place	1981	Men's Team

Hideo Gotoh is a Japanese former international table tennis player.

He won a bronze medal at the 1979 World Table Tennis Championships in the Swaythling Cup (men's team event) with Hiroyuki Abe, Masahiro Maehara, Seiji Ono and Norio Takashima for Japan.

He then won another bronze medal at the 1981 World Table Tennis Championships.

== See also ==
- List of table tennis players
- List of World Table Tennis Championships medalists
