= Tibor Kreisz =

Hungarian table tennis player

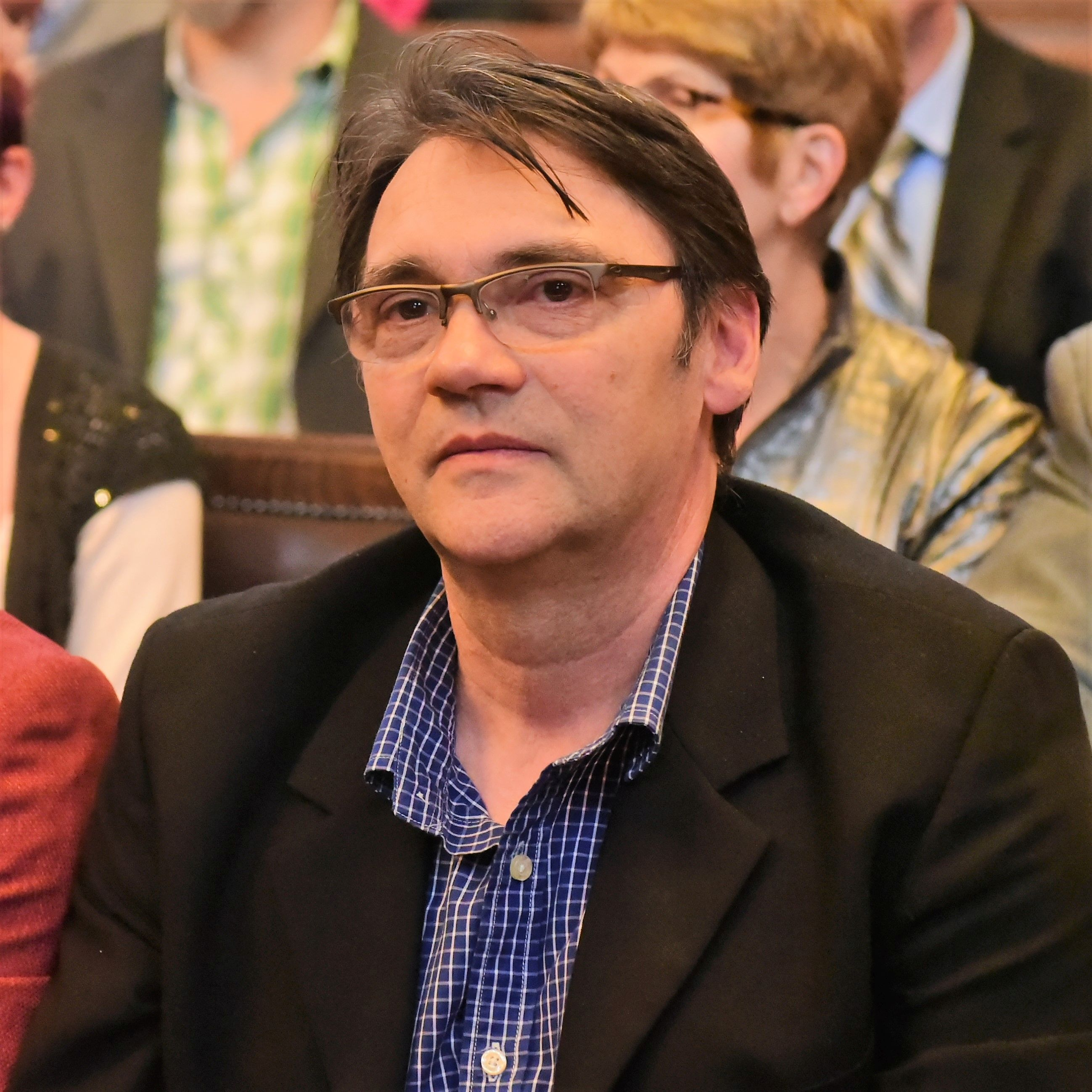

Personal information
- Nationality: Hungary
- Born: 16 April 1958 (age 68)
- Height: 175 cm (5 ft 9 in)

Achievements and titles
- Highest world ranking: 20 (January 1979)
Medal record
Men's table tennis
Representing Hungary
World Table Tennis Championships
Gold medal – first place	1979 Pyongyang	Team
Silver medal – second place	1981 Novi Sad	Team

Tibor Kreisz (born 16 April 1958) is a male former international table tennis player from Hungary.

He won a gold medal at the 1979 World Table Tennis Championships in the Swaythling Cup (men's team event) with Gábor Gergely, István Jónyer, Tibor Klampár and János Takács for Hungary.

Two years later he won a silver medal at the 1981 World Table Tennis Championships in the Swaythling Cup (men's team event) with Gergely, Jónyer, Klampár and Zsolt Kriston.

He also won a European Table Tennis Championships medal in 1978.

== See also ==
- List of table tennis players
- List of World Table Tennis Championships medalists
