= Elmar Stegmann =

German table tennis player

Personal information
- Nationality: Germany
- Born: 30 September 1935 (age 90) Vöhringen, Bavaria
Medal record
Representing West Germany
World Table Tennis Championships
Bronze medal – third place	1963	Men's Team

Elmar Stegmann is a male former international table tennis player from Germany.

He won a bronze medal at the 1963 World Table Tennis Championships in the Swaythling Cup (men's team event) with Eric Arndt, Dieter Michalek, Eberhard Schöler and Ernst Gomolla.

== See also ==
- List of table tennis players
- List of World Table Tennis Championships medalists
