= Yan Guili =

Chinese table tennis player

Yan Guili (Yen Kuei-li)
Personal information
- Nationality: China
- Born: 16 February 1955 (age 71)
Medal record
World Table Tennis Championships
Bronze medal – third place	1977	Mixed Doubles
Silver medal – second place	1979	Women's Doubles
Silver medal – second place	1979	Mixed Doubles
Bronze medal – third place	1981	Women's Doubles

Yan Guili (born 16 February 1955) also known as Yen Kuei-li is a former international table tennis player from China.

== Table tennis career ==
She won four medals in the World Table Tennis Championships.

During the 1977 World Table Tennis Championships she won a bronze medal in the mixed doubles with Li Zhenshi.

Two years later she won double silver in the mixed doubles with Li Zhenshi again and the women's doubles with Ge Xin'ai.

== See also ==
- List of table tennis players
- List of World Table Tennis Championships medalists
