= Erich Arndt (table tennis) =

German table tennis player (1938–2026)

Personal information
- Nationality: Germany
- Born: 18 May 1938 Frankfurt, Gau Hesse-Nassau, Germany
- Died: 24 April 2026 (aged 87)
Medal record
Representing West Germany
World Table Tennis Championships
Bronze medal – third place	1963	Men's Team

Erich Arndt (18 May 1938 – 24 April 2026) was a German international table tennis player.

== Biography ==
Arndt won a bronze medal at the 1963 World Table Tennis Championships in the Swaythling Cup (men's team event) with Ernst Gomolla, Dieter Michalek, Eberhard Schöler and Elmar Stegmann.

He also won two medals at the European Table Tennis Championships.

Arndt died on 24 April 2026, at the age of 87.

== See also ==
- List of table tennis players
- List of World Table Tennis Championships medalists
