= Dieter Michalek =

German table tennis player

Personal information
- Nationality: Germany
- Born: 23 June 1937 (age 89) Berlin
Medal record
Representing West Germany
World Table Tennis Championships
Bronze medal – third place	1963	Men's Team

Dieter Michalek is a male former international table tennis player from Germany.

He won a bronze medal at the 1963 World Table Tennis Championships in the Swaythling Cup (men's team event) with Ernst Gomolla, Erich Arndt, Eberhard Schöler and Elmar Stegmann.

He also won a medal at the European Table Tennis Championships.

== See also ==
- List of table tennis players
- List of World Table Tennis Championships medalists
