= Ro Jong-suk =

North Korean table tennis player

Personal information
- Nationality: North Korea
Medal record
Women's table tennis
Representing North Korea
World Table Tennis Championships
Bronze medal – third place	1979	women's doubles

Ro Jong-suk is a female former North Korean international table tennis player.

== Table tennis career ==
She won a bronze medal in the women's doubles with Li Song-suk at the 1979 World Table Tennis Championships.

== See also ==
- List of table tennis players
- List of World Table Tennis Championships medalists
