= Gordana Perkučin =

Yugoslav and Serbian table tennis player

Personal information
- Nationality: Yugoslavia, Serbia
- Born: 7 May 1962 (age 64) Novi Kneževac, PR Serbia; FPR Yugoslavia

Sport
- Sport: Table tennis
Medal record
Women's table tennis
Representing Yugoslavia
Olympic Games
Bronze medal – third place	1988 Seoul	Doubles
World Championships
Silver medal – second place	1989 Dortmund	Mixed Doubles
Bronze medal – third place	1979 Pyongyang	Doubles
European Championships
Gold medal – first place	1992 Stuttgart	Doubles
Silver medal – second place	1980 Berne	Singles
Silver medal – second place	1984 Moscow	Doubles
Silver medal – second place	1984 Moscow	Team
Silver medal – second place	1986 Prague	Mixed Doubles

Gordana Perkučin (born 7 May 1962 in Novi Kneževac) is a Yugoslav and Serbian table tennis player who competed in the 1988 Summer Olympics and in the 1992 Summer Olympics.

== Table tennis career ==
In 1988, she won the bronze medal in the women's doubles together with Jasna Fazlić at the 1988 Summer Olympics. Four years later, she competed as an Independent Olympic Participant but was eliminated in the first round.

She has won two World Championship medals; a bronze at the 1979 World Table Tennis Championships in the doubles with Erzsebet Palatinus, and a silver medal at the 1989 World Table Tennis Championships in the mixed doubles with Zoran Kalinić.

== See also ==
- List of table tennis players
- List of World Table Tennis Championships medalists

Awards
Preceded by Bojana Šumonja	Yugoslav Sportswoman of the Year; 1979	Succeeded by Štefica Krištof
