= Erzsebet Palatinus =

Yugoslav table tennis player (1959–2026)

Erzsébet Palatinus
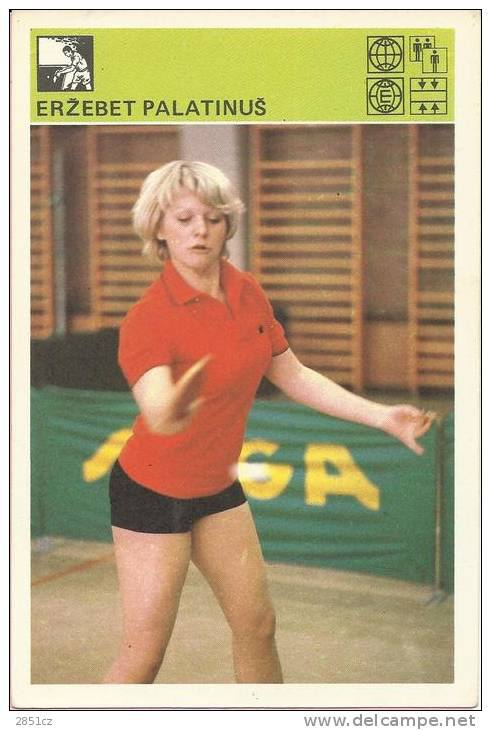

Personal information
- Full name: Erzsébet Palatinus
- Nationality: Yugoslavia
- Born: 1959 Čoka, AP Vojvodina, PR Serbia, FPR Yugoslavia (present day Serbia)
- Died: 16 January 2026 (aged 66)

Sport
- Sport: Table tennis
Medal record
Women's table tennis
Representing Yugoslavia
World Championships
Bronze medal – third place	1979 Pyongyang	Doubles
European Championships
Gold medal – first place	1976 Prague	Doubles
Bronze medal – third place	1980 Berne	Doubles

Erzsebet Palatinus (1959 – 16 January 2026) was a Yugoslav table tennis player who competed in the 1979 World Table Tennis Championships in Pyongyang, where she won the bronze medal in women's doubles, together with Gordana Perkučin. Palatinus died on 16 January 2026, at the age of 66.
