= Antun Stipančić =

Croatian table tennis player

Personal information
- Nickname: Tova
- Nationality: Yugoslavia
- Born: 18 May 1949 Duga Resa, SFR Yugoslavia
- Died: 20 November 1991 (aged 42) Zagreb, Croatia
- Height: 176 cm (5 ft 9 in)

Sport
- Sport: Table tennis
- Playing style: Left-handed, shakehand grip
- Highest ranking: 2 (June 1975)
Medal record
Men's table tennis
Representing Yugoslavia
World Championships
Bronze medal – third place	1981 Novi Sad	Doubles
Gold medal – first place	1979 Pyongyang	Doubles
Bronze medal – third place	1977 Birmingham	Doubles
Silver medal – second place	1975 Calcutta	Singles
Silver medal – second place	1975 Calcutta	Doubles
Silver medal – second place	1975 Calcutta	Team
Bronze medal – third place	1973 Sarajevo	Singles
Bronze medal – third place	1973 Sarajevo	Doubles
Silver medal – second place	1971 Nagoya	Mixed Doubles
Bronze medal – third place	1971 Nagoya	Team
Bronze medal – third place	1969 Munich	Team
European Championships
Silver medal – second place	1980 Berne	Doubles
Bronze medal – third place	1980 Berne	Mixed Doubles
Bronze medal – third place	1978 Duisburg	Doubles
Bronze medal – third place	1976 Prague	Doubles
Gold medal – first place	1976 Prague	Mixed Doubles
Gold medal – first place	1976 Prague	Team
Bronze medal – third place	1974 Novi Sad	Doubles
Bronze medal – third place	1974 Novi Sad	Mixed Doubles
Bronze medal – third place	1972 Rotterdam	Singles
Silver medal – second place	1972 Rotterdam	Team
Gold medal – first place	1970 Moscow	Doubles
Silver medal – second place	1970 Moscow	Team
Gold medal – first place	1968 Lyon	Doubles

Antun "Tova" Stipančić (May 18, 1949 — November 20, 1991) was a Croatian and Yugoslav professional table tennis player.

He was named Croatia’s Best Sportsman in 1975 and won the national championship on multiple occasions. He also became a three-time European doubles champion, won the men’s doubles title at the 1979 World Table Tennis Championships with Dragutin Šurbek, and was the men’s singles silver medalist at the 1975 World Championships. He was also known by the nickname “the golden left hand of Croatian sport”.

== Early life ==
Antun Stipančić was born in Duga Resa, a town in Karlovac County, Croatia, one of the six constituent republics of Yugoslavia. He was the eldest of three sons born to Ivan and Franca Stipančić. The family lived near the local football ground, which also housed the premises of the Duga Resa table tennis club.

In the late 1950s, local sports enthusiasts established the table tennis club Pamučna industrija, where Stipančić began training as a child.

== Professional career ==
=== Early career (1961-1969) ===
Stipančić won his first tournament in 1961, at the age of 12, in the Karlovac League cadet competition. A few months later, he won the Ribnjak tournament in Zagreb.

In 1965, Stipančić played against world champion Zhuang Zedong at the World Championships in Ljubljana and recorded his first major international victory by defeating European champion Kjell Johnson in the second round of the Polish Open Championship in Kraków.

At the 1968 European Championships in Lyon, Stipančić and Edvard Vecko won the men’s doubles title by defeating Johnson and Hans Alser in the final. After graduating from textile high school, Stipančić focused on his table tennis career.

=== Rise to prominence (1970-1974) ===
In the summer of 1970, Stipančić left Table Tennis Club (TTC) Pamučna industrija and joined TTC Vjesnik. According to contemporary reports, one reason for the move was the opportunity to train with stronger teammates, including Dragutin Šurbek and Zlatko Čordaš, and to compete in the European Cup. Reflecting on the transition, he later described it as a period of adjustment and change.

Later that year, Stipančić won the Zagreb International Tournament, defeating Zhou Lansun and Li Furong, Šurbek in the semi-finals, and Zhuang Zedong in the final by 16-21, 21-12, 21-12. The victory received extensive coverage in the Yugoslav press, with newspapers publishing headlines highlighting his wins over leading Chinese players.

In 1972, Zagreb hosted the Europe’s Top Twelve tournament, featuring many of Europe’s leading table tennis players. Stipančić won the tournament and received the trophy from Sportske Novosti editor Reno Vinek.

=== World Championship success (1975-1980) ===
At the 1975 World Table Tennis Championships in Kolkata, held at the newly built Netaji Indoor Stadium, Stipančić reached the men’s singles final. He defeated defending champion Xi Enting in the quarter-finals and Norio Takashima in the semi-finals before facing István Jónyer in the final. Stipančić won the first two sets, but Jónyer recovered to win the match in five sets, leaving Stipančić with the silver medal.

At the 1979 World Championships in Pyongyang, Stipančić returned with the Yugoslav national team. He later said, “Why not try again? I always fought more with my hand and heart than with my legs.” In the men’s double event, he and Šurbek defeated Jónyer and Tibor Klampár in the final in straight sets (3-0) to win the world title. After the victory, Stipančić said that he had finally achieved his goal of becoming a world champion.

At the 1980 European Championships in Bern, Stipančić won two medals in the doubles events. During one match, at 19-19 in the deciding set, he conceded a point to England’s Paul Day despite the referee having ruled in his favor. In recognition of this act of sportsmanship, he received the R. Bergmann Fair Play Trophy.

== Personal life ==
Shortly after joining TTC Vjesnik, Stipančić married and moved to Zagreb in early 1971. He died in Zagreb at the age of 42 on November 20, 1991.

== Legacy ==
Tova Stipančić was recognized within the international table tennis community for his playing career. He competed against players from many countries and is remembered for his contributions to the sport. His achievements also made him a notable sports figure in Croatia and his hometown of Duga Resa.

In his career, he won 27 medals, with 11 medals coming from world championships. Additionally, he won 16 medals from the European Championships.

== See also ==
- List of table tennis players
- List of World Table Tennis Championships medalists
