= Yoshiko Shimauchi =

Japanese table tennis player

Personal information
- Nationality: Japan
- Born: 1958 (age 67–68)
Medal record
Representing Japan
World Table Tennis Championships
Bronze medal – third place	1979	women's team

Yoshiko Shimauchi is a former Japanese international table tennis player.

== Table tennis career ==
She won a bronze medal at the 1979 World Table Tennis Championships in the Corbillon Cup (women's team event) with Kayoko Kawahigashi, Kayo Sugaya and Shoko Takahashi for Japan.

She also won four Asian Table Tennis Championships medals.

== See also ==
- List of World Table Tennis Championships medalists
