= Yang Ying (table tennis, born 1953) =

Chinese table tennis player

Personal information
- Nationality: China
- Born: 1953 (age 72–73) Dazu District, Sichuan (now Chongqing), China

Sport
- Sport: Table tennis
Medal record
Women's table tennis
World Championships
Gold medal – first place	1977 Birmingham	Doubles
Asian Championships
Silver medal – second place	1978 Kuala Lumpur	Singles
Gold medal – first place	1978 Kuala Lumpur	Team
Asian Games
Bronze medal – third place	1978 Bangkok	Doubles
Gold medal – first place	1978 Bangkok	Team

Yang Ying
- Simplified Chinese: 杨莹
Transcriptions
Standard Mandarin
- Hanyu Pinyin: Yáng Yíng

Yang Ying (born 1953) is a retired Chinese international table tennis player.

== Table tennis career ==
She won the 1977 World Table Tennis Championships in women's doubles, partnering with North Korean player Pak Yong-ok. In the 1978 Asian Table Tennis Championships, she won a silver in women's singles and a gold in team competition. In the 1978 Asian Games, she won a bronze in women's doubles (partnering with Cao Yanhua) and a gold in team competition.

Later she played in Germany's Bundesliga for DSC Kaiserberg, helping the club win the 1980–1981 season as well as the 1981 ETTU Cup.

== Retirement ==
After retirement she coached the German club ATSV Saarbrücken, and is currently the head coach of the Saarland Table Tennis Association.

== See also ==
- List of table tennis players
- List of World Table Tennis Championships medalists
