= Judit Magos-Havas =

Hungarian table tennis player (1951–2018)

Personal information
- Nationality: Hungary
- Born: 19 February 1951 Budapest, Hungary
- Died: 18 October 2018 (aged 67)

Sport
- Sport: Table tennis
Medal record
Women's table tennis
Representing Hungary
European Championships
Bronze medal – third place	1982 Budapest	Doubles
Silver medal – second place	1980 Berne	Team
Gold medal – first place	1978 Duisburg	Singles
Silver medal – second place	1978 Duisburg	Doubles
Gold medal – first place	1978 Duisburg	Team
Gold medal – first place	1974 Novi Sad	Singles
Gold medal – first place	1974 Novi Sad	Doubles
Silver medal – second place	1974 Novi Sad	Team
Gold medal – first place	1972 Rotterdam	Doubles
Bronze medal – third place	1972 Rotterdam	Mixed Doubles
Gold medal – first place	1972 Rotterdam	Team

Judit Magos-Havas (19 February 1951 — 18 October 2018), was a female international table tennis player from Hungary.

== Table tennis career ==
From 1972 to 1982, she won eleven medals in singles, doubles, and team events in the Table Tennis European Championships. This included six gold medals.

She was named Hungarian Sportswoman of the year in 1978 after winning two gold medals at that year's European Championships.

== See also ==
- List of table tennis players

Awards
Preceded by Mariann Ambrus	Hungarian Sportswoman of The Year; 1978	Succeeded by Andrea Mátay
