= Cao Yanhua =

Chinese table tennis player

Cao Yanhua (Tsao Yen-hua)
Personal information
- Nationality: China
- Born: 1 December 1962 (age 63)

Sport
- Sport: Table tennis
Medal record
Women's table tennis
Representing China
World Championships
Gold medal – first place	1985 Gothenburg	Singles
Silver medal – second place	1985 Gothenburg	Doubles
Gold medal – first place	1985 Gothenburg	Mixed Doubles
Gold medal – first place	1983 Tokyo	Singles
Bronze medal – third place	1983 Tokyo	Doubles
Bronze medal – third place	1983 Tokyo	Mixed Doubles
Gold medal – first place	1983 Tokyo	Women's Team
Silver medal – second place	1981 Novi Sad	Singles
Gold medal – first place	1981 Novi Sad	Doubles
Gold medal – first place	1981 Novi Sad	Women's Team
Gold medal – first place	1979 Pyongyang	Women's Team
Asian Championships
Gold medal – first place	1982 Jakarta	Singles
Gold medal – first place	1982 Jakarta	Doubles
Bronze medal – third place	1982 Jakarta	Mixed Doubles
Gold medal – first place	1982 Jakarta	Women's Team
Gold medal – first place	1978 Kuala Lumpur	Singles
Bronze medal – third place	1978 Kuala Lumpur	Doubles
Gold medal – first place	1978 Kuala Lumpur	Women's Team

Cao Yanhua (Chinese: 曹燕华; pinyin: Cáo Yànhuá) also Tsao Yen-hua is a Chinese former international table tennis player.

== Career ==
From 1978 to 1985, Yanhua won many medals in singles, doubles, and team events in the Asian Table Tennis Championships and in the World Table Tennis Championships. However, in 1979, after winning Corbillon Cup as a member of Chinese team for her first time, she lost to Judit Magos in second round.

The eleven World Championship medals included seven gold medals; two in the singles at the 1983 World Table Tennis Championships and 1985 World Table Tennis Championships, three in the team, one in the mixed doubles with Cai Zhenhua and one in the women's doubles with Zhang Deying.

== See also ==
- List of table tennis players
- List of World Table Tennis Championships medalists
