= Kayoko Kawahigashi =

Japanese table tennis player

Personal information
- Nationality: Japan
- Born: 1958 (age 67–68)
Medal record
Representing Japan
World Table Tennis Championships
Bronze medal – third place	1979	women's team

Kayoko Kawahigashi is a former Japanese international table tennis player.

== Table tennis career ==
She won a bronze medal at the 1979 World Table Tennis Championships in the Corbillon Cup (women's team event) with Yoshiko Shimauchi, Kayo Sugaya and Shoko Takahashi for Japan.

She also won the 1985 US Open singles and doubles titles.

== See also ==
- List of World Table Tennis Championships medalists
