= Masahiro Maehara =

Japanese table tennis player

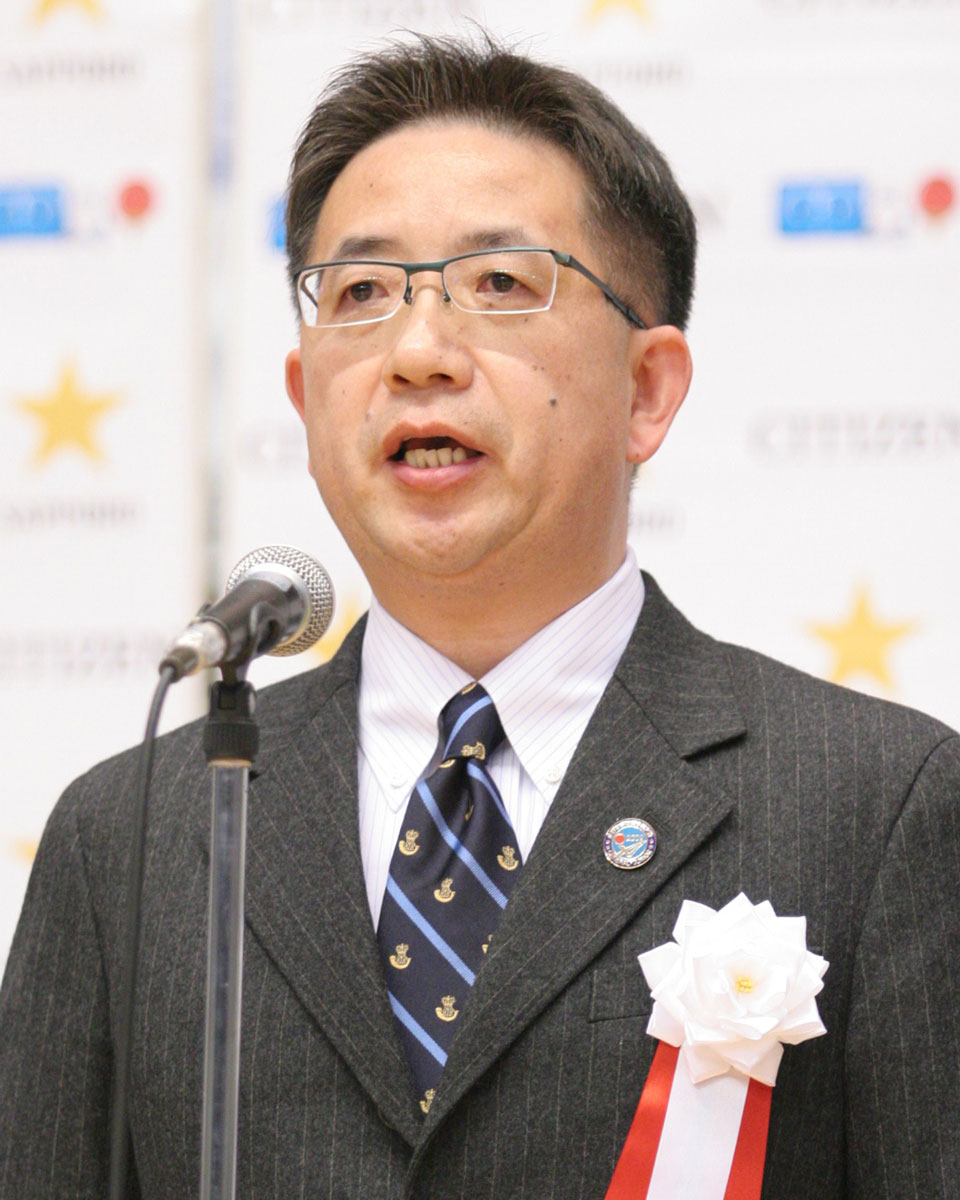

Personal information
- Nationality: Japan
- Born: 24 November 1953 (age 72)
Medal record
Representing Japan
World Table Tennis Championships
Silver medal – second place	1977	Men's Team
Bronze medal – third place	1979	Men's Team
Bronze medal – third place	1981	Men's Team

Masahiro Maehara is a Japanese former international table tennis player.

He won a silver medal at the 1977 World Table Tennis Championships in the Swaythling Cup (men's team event) with Tetsuo Inoue, Mitsuru Kono, Norio Takashima and Tokio Tasaka for Japan.

He then won two bronze medals at the 1979 World Table Tennis Championships and 1981 World Table Tennis Championships.

He was later the Director of the Japanese Table Tennis Association.

== See also ==
- List of table tennis players
- List of World Table Tennis Championships medalists
