= Ri Song-suk =

North Korean table tennis player

Personal information
- Nationality: North Korea
Medal record
Women's table tennis
Representing North Korea
World Table Tennis Championships
Bronze medal – third place	1977 Birmingham	Team
Silver medal – second place	1979 Pyongyang	Team
Bronze medal – third place	1979 Pyongyang	Doubles
Silver medal – second place	1979 Pyongyang	Singles
Bronze medal – third place	1981 Novi Sad	Team
Bronze medal – third place	1983 Tokyo	Team

Korean name
- Hangul: 리성숙
- RR: Ri Seongsuk
- MR: Ri Sŏngsuk

Ri Song-suk is a female former North Korean international table tennis player.

== Table tennis career ==
She won a silver medal in the women's singles and a bronze medal in the women's doubles with Ro Jong-suk at the 1979 World Table Tennis Championships.

She also won four team medals from 1977 to 1983.

== See also ==
- List of table tennis players
- List of World Table Tennis Championships medalists
