= Hiroyuki Abe (table tennis) =

Japanese table tennis player

Personal information
- Nationality: Japan
- Born: Yamaguchi, Japan
Medal record
Representing Japan
World Table Tennis Championships
Bronze medal – third place	1979	Men's Team
Bronze medal – third place	1981	Men's Team
Bronze medal – third place	1983	Men's Doubles
Friendship Games
Gold medal – first place	1984 Moscow	Men's doubles

Hiroyuki Abe (阿部 博幸) is a former Japanese international table tennis player.

He won a bronze medal at the 1983 World Table Tennis Championships in the men's doubles with Seiji Ono. He also won two bronze medals in the men's team event.

== See also ==
- List of table tennis players
- List of World Table Tennis Championships medalists
