= Patrick Birocheau =

French table tennis player

Personal information
- Nationality: France
- Born: 23 September 1955 (age 70) Béjaïa, Algeria
- Height: 1.877 m (6 ft 2 in)
- Weight: 72 kg (159 lb)

Sport
- Sport: Table tennis
- Club: SAG Cestas
Medal record
World Championships
Bronze medal – third place	1981 Novi Sad	Doubles
European Championships
Gold medal – first place	1980 Bern	Doubles
Gold medal – first place	1984 Moscow	Team
Silver medal – second place	1986 Prague	Team
Bronze medal – third place	1982 Budapest	Doubles
Bronze medal – third place	1984 Moscow	Doubles

Patrick Birocheau (born 23 September 1955) is a French former table tennis player. He won a bronze medal at the 1981 World Championships in doubles, as well as several medals at the European Championships throughout the 1980s.

He represented his country at the 1988 Summer Olympics in Seoul. In the singles competition, Birocheau was eliminated in the group phase after winning three of his seven matches. He teamed up with future World Champion Jean-Philippe Gatien in the doubles competition, but they were similarly eliminated after winning four of their seven matches.

In addition to his international success, Birocheau won eleven gold medals at the French National Championships: one in singles (1976), nine in doubles (1973–76, 1978, 1979, 1982, 1987, 1988), and one in mixed doubles (1983).

He later served as head coach of the French national team.

== See also ==
- List of table tennis players
- List of World Table Tennis Championships medalists
