= Pak Yung-sun =

North Korean table tennis player

Personal information
- Nationality: North Korea
- Born: 22 August 1956 Sakchu County, North Pyongan
- Died: 14 July 1987 (aged 30)

Sport
- Sport: Table tennis
- Club: February 8 Sports Club
Medal record
Women's table tennis
World Championships
Bronze medal – third place	1981 Novi Sad	Team
Silver medal – second place	1979 Pyongyang	Team
Gold medal – first place	1977 Birmingham	Singles
Bronze medal – third place	1977 Birmingham	Team
Gold medal – first place	1975 Calcutta	Singles
Asian Championships
Bronze medal – third place	1976 Pyongyang	Singles
Gold medal – first place	1976 Pyongyang	Doubles
Gold medal – first place	1976 Pyongyang	Team

- Pak Yung-sun
- Hangul: 박영순
- Hanja: 朴英順
- RR: Bak Yeongsun
- MR: Pak Yŏngsun

Pak Yung-sun (Korean: 박영순; 22 August 1956 – 14 July 1987), People's Athlete and Labor Hero, was an international table tennis player from North Korea. She represented the Korean People's Army's February 8 Sports Club.

== Table tennis career ==
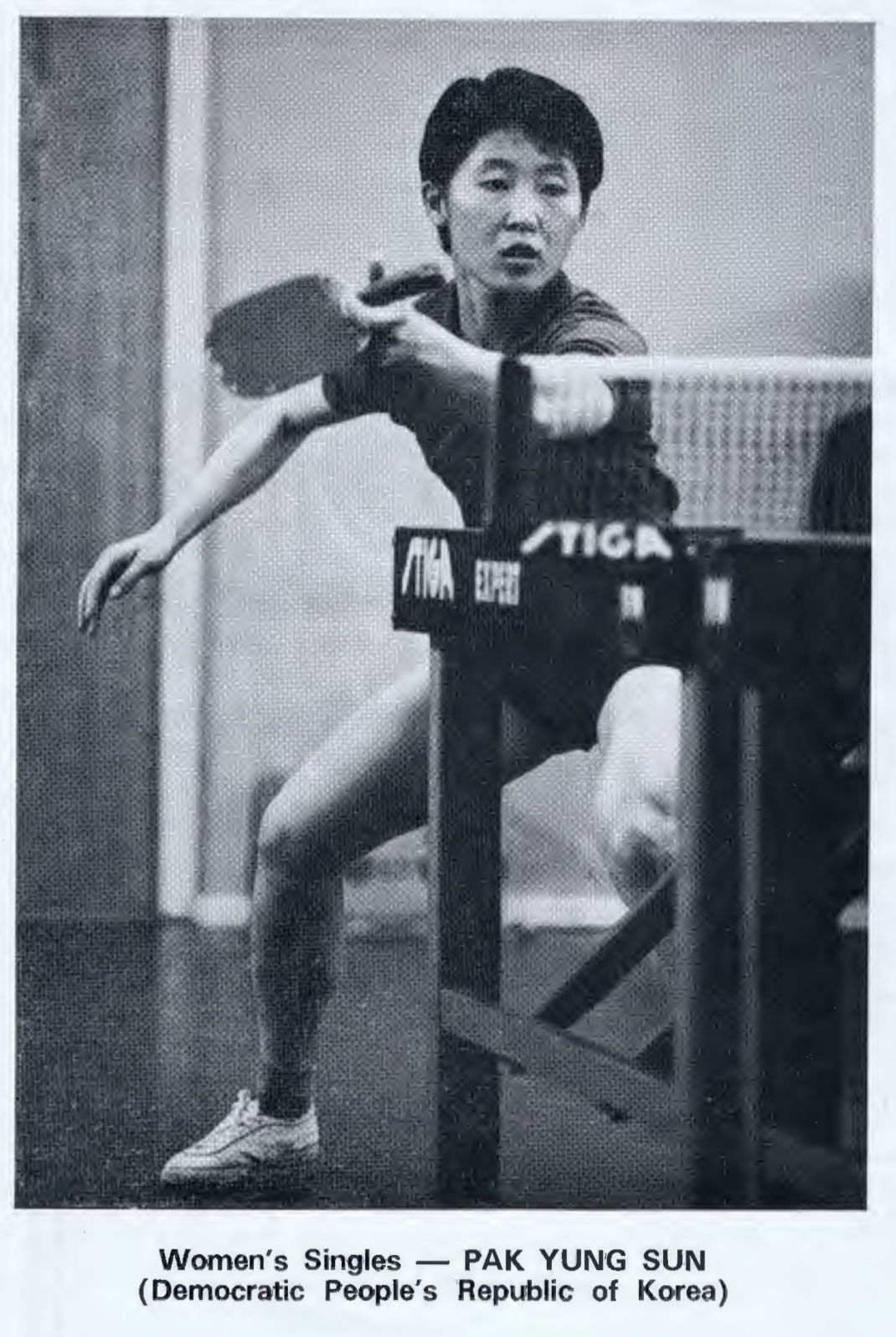
Pak Yung Sun 1977

From 1974 to 1981 she won several medals in singles, doubles, and team events in the Asian Table Tennis Championships and in the World Table Tennis Championships.

The five World Championship medals included two gold medals in the singles at the 1975 World Table Tennis Championships and 1977 World Table Tennis Championships.

She is buried at the Patriotic Martyrs' Cemetery.

== See also ==
- List of table tennis players
- List of World Table Tennis Championships medalists
