= Seiji Ono =

Japanese table tennis player

Personal information
- Full name: Seiji Ono
- Nationality: Japan
- Born: 18 June 1956 (age 70) Seiyo, Ehime

Sport
- Sport: Table tennis
Medal record
Men's table tennis
Representing Japan
World Championships
Gold medal – first place	1979 Pyongyang	Singles
Bronze medal – third place	1979 Pyongyang	Team
Bronze medal – third place	1981 Novi Sad	Team
Bronze medal – third place	1983 Tokyo	Doubles
Friendship Games
Gold medal – first place	1984 Moscow	Men's doubles
Asian Championships
Gold medal – first place	1978 Kuala Lumpur	Mixed Doubles
Bronze medal – third place	1978 Kuala Lumpur	Doubles
Bronze medal – third place	1986 Shenzhen	Doubles

Seiji Ono (小野 誠治, Ono Seiji; born June 18, 1956) is a former international table tennis player from Japan.

== Table tennis career ==
From 1978 to 1983 he won several medals in singles, doubles, and team events in the World Table Tennis Championships and in the Asian Table Tennis Championships.

The four World Championship medals included a gold medal in the men's singles at the 1979 World Table Tennis Championships. He also competed at the 1988 Summer Olympics.

== See also ==
- List of table tennis players
- List of World Table Tennis Championships medalists
