= Ge Xin'ai =

Chinese table tennis player

Ge Xin'ai (Ke Hsin-ai)
Personal information
- Nationality: China
- Born: 30 June 1953 (age 73)

Sport
- Sport: Table tennis
Medal record
Women's table tennis
Representing China
World Championships
Gold medal – first place	1979 Pyongyang	Singles
Silver medal – second place	1979 Pyongyang	Doubles
Gold medal – first place	1979 Pyongyang	Mixed Doubles
Gold medal – first place	1979 Pyongyang	Team
Bronze medal – third place	1977 Birmingham	Singles
Bronze medal – third place	1977 Birmingham	Doubles
Gold medal – first place	1977 Birmingham	Team
Bronze medal – third place	1975 Calcutta	Singles
Gold medal – first place	1975 Calcutta	Team
Asian Championships
Bronze medal – third place	1976 Pyongyang	Singles
Silver medal – second place	1976 Pyongyang	Mixed Doubles
Silver medal – second place	1976 Pyongyang	Team

Ge Xin'ai (Chinese: 葛新爱; Wade–Giles: Ke Hsin-ai; born 1953) is a former international table tennis player from China.

== Table tennis career ==
From 1975 to 1979 she won several medals in singles, doubles, and team events in the Asian Table Tennis Championships, and in the World Table Tennis Championships.

The nine World Championship medals included five gold medals; one in the singles at the 1979 World Table Tennis Championships, three in the team event and one in the mixed doubles at the 1979 World Table Tennis Championships with Liang Geliang.

== See also ==
- List of table tennis players
- List of World Table Tennis Championships medalists
