= Pak Yong-ok =

North Korean table tennis player

Personal information
- Nationality: North Korea
- Born: 1956 (age 69–70)

Sport
- Sport: Table tennis
Medal record
Women's table tennis
World Championships
Silver medal – second place	1979 Pyongyang	Team
Gold medal – first place	1977 Birmingham	Doubles
Bronze medal – third place	1977 Birmingham	Team

- Pak Yong-ok
- Hangul: 박영옥
- RR: Bak Yeongok
- MR: Pak Yŏngok

Pak Yong-ok is a former women's international table tennis player from North Korea.

== Table tennis career ==
From 1976 to 1980 she won several medals in doubles, and team events in the Asian Table Tennis Championships and in the World Table Tennis Championships.

Her three World Championship medals included a gold medal in the doubles at the 1977 World Table Tennis Championships.

== See also ==
- List of table tennis players
- List of World Table Tennis Championships medalists
