= Wang Huiyuan =

Chinese table tennis player

Personal information
- Nationality: China
- Born: 11 October 1960 (age 65)

Sport
- Sport: Table tennis
Medal record
Men's table tennis
Representing China
World Championships
Gold medal – first place	1981 Novi Sad	Team
Gold medal – first place	1985 Gothenburg	Team
Bronze medal – third place	1979 Pyongyang	Doubles
Bronze medal – third place	1979 Pyongyang	Mixed
Bronze medal – third place	1983 Tokyo	Singles
Bronze medal – third place	1983 Tokyo	Doubles

Wang Huiyuan (Chinese: 王会元) is a male former international table tennis player from China.

== Table tennis career ==
From 1979 to 1985, he won several medals in singles, doubles, and team events in the Asian Table Tennis Championships and six medals in the World Table Tennis Championships.

The six World Championship medals included two gold medals in the team event for China.

He also won an English Open title.

== See also ==
- List of table tennis players
- List of World Table Tennis Championships medalists
