= Zhang Li (table tennis) =

Chinese table tennis player (1951–2019)

Zhang Li (Chang Li)
Personal information
- Nationality: China
- Born: 3 May 1951
- Died: 13 February 2019 (aged 67)

Sport
- Sport: Table tennis
Medal record
Women's table tennis
Representing China
World Championships
Gold medal – first place	1979 Pyongyang	Doubles
Gold medal – first place	1979 Pyongyang	Team
Silver medal – second place	1977 Birmingham	Singles
Bronze medal – third place	1977 Birmingham	Doubles
Gold medal – first place	1977 Birmingham	Team
Silver medal – second place	1975 Calcutta	Singles
Bronze medal – third place	1975 Calcutta	Mixed Doubles
Gold medal – first place	1975 Calcutta	Team
Bronze medal – third place	1973 Sarajevo	Singles
Silver medal – second place	1973 Sarajevo	Team
Asian Championships
Bronze medal – third place	1978 Kuala Lumpur	Singles
Bronze medal – third place	1978 Kuala Lumpur	Doubles
Silver medal – second place	1978 Kuala Lumpur	Mixed Doubles
Gold medal – first place	1978 Kuala Lumpur	Team
Gold medal – first place	1976 Pyongyang	Singles
Silver medal – second place	1976 Pyongyang	Doubles
Silver medal – second place	1976 Pyongyang	Team
Gold medal – first place	1974 Yokohama	Doubles
Silver medal – second place	1974 Yokohama	Mixed Doubles
Silver medal – second place	1974 Yokohama	Team

Zhang Li (Chinese: 张立; pinyin: Zhāng Lì; Wade–Giles: Chang Li; 3 May 1951 – 13 February 2019) was a female international table tennis player from China.

== Table tennis career ==
From 1973 to 1979 she won ten medals in the World Table Tennis Championships and several medals in the Asian Table Tennis Championships.

The ten World Championship medals included four gold medals; one in the singles at the 1979 World Table Tennis Championships with Zhang Deying and three more in the Corbillon Cup (team event) for China.

== Personal life ==
After retiring from competition, Zhang and her husband Li Zhenshi moved to the US, where they directed the World Champions Table Tennis Academy in San Jose, California. She died on 13 February 2019.
