= Zhang Deying =

Chinese table tennis player

Zhang Deying (Chang Te-ying)
Personal information
- Nationality: China
- Born: 1 July 1953 (age 73)

Sport
- Sport: Table tennis
Medal record
Women's table tennis
Representing China
World Championships
Bronze medal – third place	1981 Novi Sad	Singles
Gold medal – first place	1981 Novi Sad	Doubles
Gold medal – first place	1981 Novi Sad	Team
Bronze medal – third place	1979 Pyongyang	Singles
Gold medal – first place	1979 Pyongyang	Doubles
Bronze medal – third place	1979 Pyongyang	Mixed Doubles
Gold medal – first place	1979 Pyongyang	Team
Bronze medal – third place	1977 Birmingham	Singles
Gold medal – first place	1977 Birmingham	Team
Asian Championships
Gold medal – first place	1980 Calcutta	Doubles
Gold medal – first place	1980 Calcutta	Mixed Doubles
Gold medal – first place	1980 Calcutta	Team
Bronze medal – third place	1978 Kuala Lumpur	Singles
Bronze medal – third place	1978 Kuala Lumpur	Doubles
Bronze medal – third place	1978 Kuala Lumpur	Mixed Doubles
Gold medal – first place	1978 Kuala Lumpur	Team
Silver medal – second place	1976 Pyongyang	Singles
Silver medal – second place	1976 Pyongyang	Doubles
Bronze medal – third place	1976 Pyongyang	Mixed Doubles
Silver medal – second place	1976 Pyongyang	Team

Zhang Deying (Chinese: 張徳英, born July 1, 1953) also Chang Te-ying, is a former international table tennis player from China.

== Table tennis career ==
From 1977 to 1981 she won several medals in singles, doubles, and team events in the Asian Table Tennis Championships and in the World Table Tennis Championships.

Her nine World Championship medals included five gold medals; three in the team and two in the doubles with Zhang Li and Cao Yanhua.

She was inducted into the ITTF Hall of Fame in 2010.

== See also ==
- List of table tennis players
- ITTF Hall of Fame
- List of table tennis players
- List of World Table Tennis Championships medalists
