= Dragutin Šurbek =

Croatian table tennis player

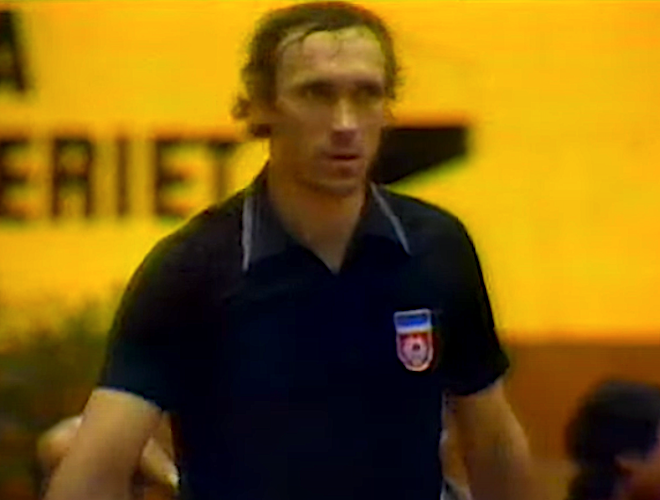

Personal information
- Born: 8 August 1946 Zagreb, SR Croatia, Yugoslavia
- Died: 15 July 2018 (aged 71)
- Height: 180 cm (5 ft 11 in)

Sport
- Sport: Table tennis
- Playing style: Right-handed, shakehand grip
- Highest ranking: 2 (December 1974)
Medal record
Men's table tennis
Representing Yugoslavia
World Championships
| Gold medal – first place | 1979 Pyongyang | Doubles |
| Gold medal – first place | 1983 Tokyo | Doubles |
| Silver medal – second place | 1975 Calcutta | Doubles |
| Silver medal – second place | 1975 Calcutta | Team |
| Bronze medal – third place | 1969 Munich | Team |
| Bronze medal – third place | 1971 Nagoya | Singles |
| Bronze medal – third place | 1971 Nagoya | Team |
| Bronze medal – third place | 1973 Sarajevo | Singles |
| Bronze medal – third place | 1973 Sarajevo | Doubles |
| Bronze medal – third place | 1977 Birmingham | Doubles |
| Bronze medal – third place | 1981 Novi Sad | Singles |
| Bronze medal – third place | 1981 Novi Sad | Doubles |
| Bronze medal – third place | 1981 Novi Sad | Mixed Doubles |
European Championships
| Gold medal – first place | 1968 Lyon | Singles |
| Gold medal – first place | 1970 Moscow | Doubles |
| Gold medal – first place | 1976 Prague | Team |
| Gold medal – first place | 1982 Budapest | Doubles |
| Gold medal – first place | 1984 Moscow | Doubles |
| Silver medal – second place | 1964 Malmo | Team |
| Silver medal – second place | 1970 Moscow | Team |
| Silver medal – second place | 1972 Rotterdam | Team |
| Silver medal – second place | 1980 Berne | Doubles |
| Silver medal – second place | 1982 Budapest | Mixed Doubles |
| Bronze medal – third place | 1974 Novi Sad | Singles |
| Bronze medal – third place | 1974 Novi Sad | Doubles |
| Bronze medal – third place | 1976 Prague | Doubles |
| Bronze medal – third place | 1978 Duisburg | Doubles |
| Bronze medal – third place | 1984 Moscow | Singles |
| Bronze medal – third place | 1984 Moscow | Mixed Doubles |
| Bronze medal – third place | 1986 Prague | Doubles |
| Bronze medal – third place | 1986 Prague | Mixed Doubles |

Dragutin Šurbek (8 August 1946 – 15 July 2018) was a Croatian and Yugoslav table tennis player and coach.

== Career ==
Šurbek won two World Championship titles in the men's doubles event. He won gold medals in 1979 (with Antun Stipančić) and in 1983 (with Zoran Kalinić). In the men's singles event, he won the bronze medal three times (in 1971, 1973 and 1981).

== See also ==
- List of table tennis players
- List of World Table Tennis Championships medalists

Awards
| Preceded by Dragan Kićanović | (Socialist Federal Republic of Yugoslavia) The Best Athlete of Yugoslavia; 1983 | Succeeded by Šaban Trstena |
| Preceded by Bojan Križaj | Yugoslav Sportsman of the Year; 1983 | Succeeded by Jure Franko |
