= Gábor Gergely =

Hungarian table tennis player

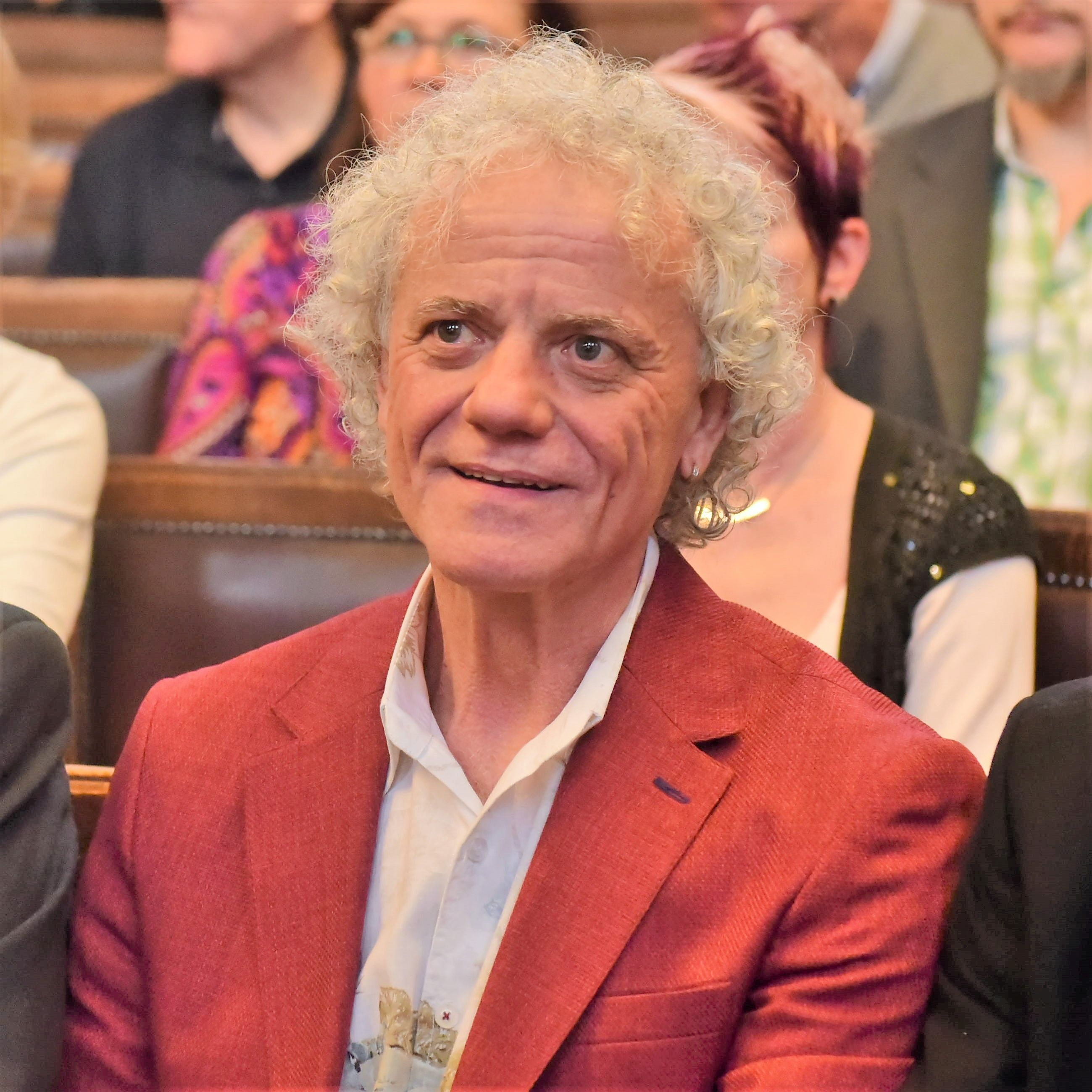
- Gábor Gergely, 2019

Personal information
- Full name: GERGELY Gábor
- Nationality: Hungary
- Born: 21 June 1953 (age 73)

Sport
- Sport: Table tennis
Medal record
Men's table tennis
Representing Hungary
World Championships
Bronze medal – third place	1983 Tokyo	Men's Team
Silver medal – second place	1981 Novi Sad	Men's Team
Gold medal – first place	1979 Pyongyang	Men's Team
Gold medal – first place	1975 Kolkata	Men's Doubles
European Championships
Bronze medal – third place	1982 Budapest	Singles
Silver medal – second place	1982 Budapest	Doubles
Gold medal – first place	1982 Budapest	Men's Team
Bronze medal – third place	1980 Berne	Doubles
Gold medal – first place	1978 Duisburg	Singles
Gold medal – first place	1978 Duisburg	Doubles
Gold medal – first place	1978 Duisburg	Men's Team
Silver medal – second place	1974 Novi Sad	Singles
Silver medal – second place	1974 Novi Sad	Men's Team

Gábor Gergely (born 21 June 1953, in Budapest) is a former international table tennis player from Hungary.

== Table tennis career ==
From 1974 to 1983 he won several medals in singles, doubles, and team events in the Table Tennis European Championships, including three medals with the Hungarian team in the World Table Tennis Championships.

== Material and playing style ==
Gergely plays a butterfly offensive wood with both sides 2,5 mm super river. He tries to attack close to the table and especially with the forehand hard topspins, but was also able to play successful from the half-distance with a lot of spin from both sides.

His four World Championship medals included a gold medal in the doubles with István Jónyer at the 1975 World Table Tennis Championships and the team event at the 1979 World Table Tennis Championships.

== See also ==
- List of table tennis players
- List of World Table Tennis Championships medalists
