= Tibor Klampár =

Hungarian table tennis player

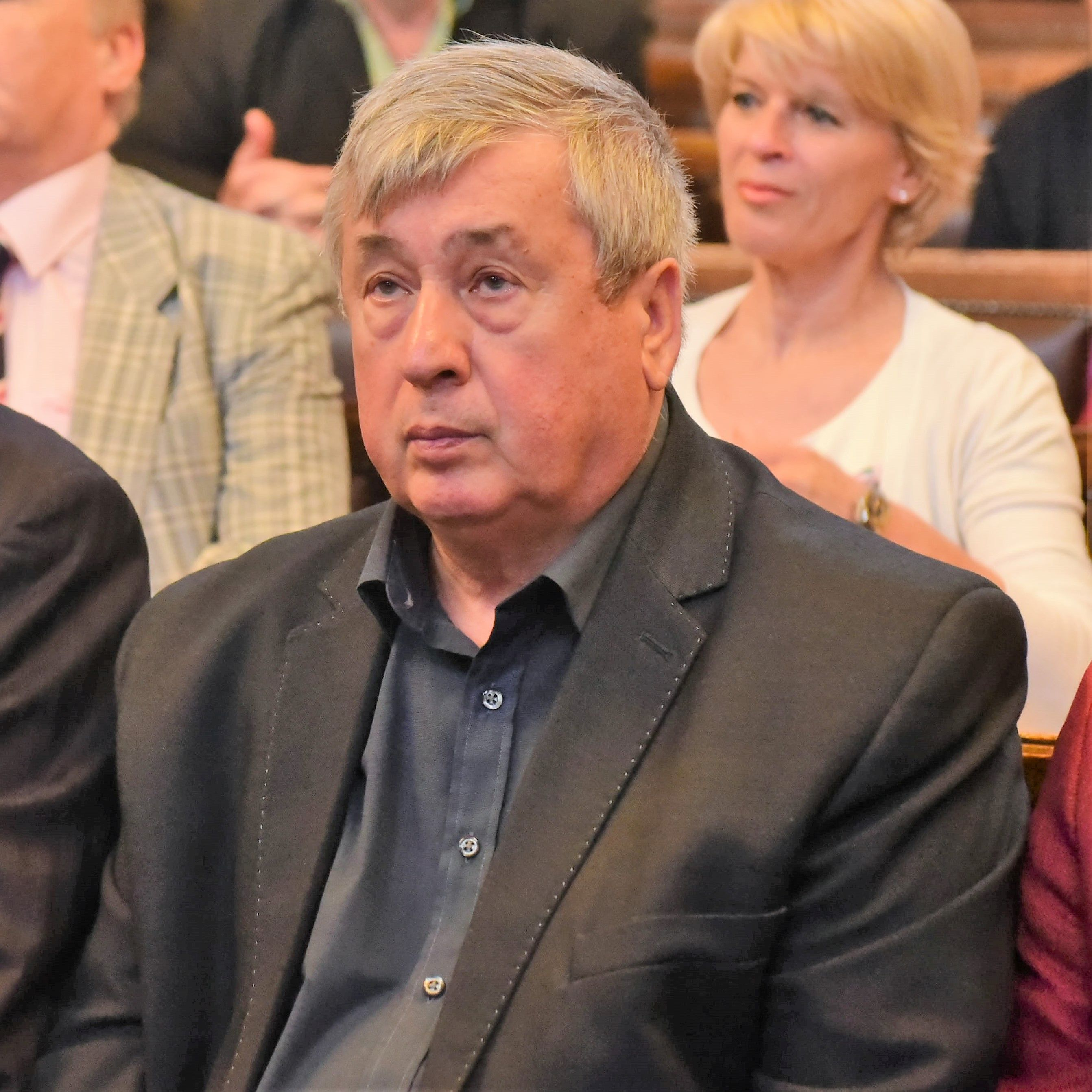
- Tibor Klampár in 2019

Personal information
- Full name: KLAMPÁR Tibor
- Nationality: Hungary
- Born: 30 April 1953 (age 73)
- Height: 177 cm (5 ft 10 in)

Sport
- Sport: Table tennis
- Playing style: Right-handed, Shakehand grip
- Highest ranking: 3 (July 1979)
Medal record
Men's table tennis
Representing Hungary
World Championships
| Event | 1st | 2nd | 3rd |
|---|---|---|---|
| World Championships | 2 | 3 | 1 |
| European Championships | 3 | 1 | 6 |
| World Cup | 1 | 0 | 0 |
| Europe Top-12/Top-16 | 1 | 0 | 0 |
World Championships
| Gold medal – first place | 1971 Nagoya | Doubles |
| Gold medal – first place | 1979 Pyongyang | Team |
| Silver medal – second place | 1973 Sarajevo | Doubles |
| Silver medal – second place | 1979 Pyongyang | Doubles |
| Silver medal – second place | 1981 Novi Sad | Team |
World Cup
| Gold medal – first place | 1981 Kuala Lumpur | Singles |
European Championships
| Gold medal – first place | 1974 Novi Sad | Doubles |
| Gold medal – first place | 1978 Duisburg | Team |
| Gold medal – first place | 1982 Budapest | Team |
| Silver medal – second place | 1974 Novi Sad | Team |
| Silver medal – second place | 1978 Duisburg | Mixed Doubles |
| Bronze medal – third place | 1970 Moscow | Doubles |
| Bronze medal – third place | 1980 Berne | Doubles |
| Bronze medal – third place | 1982 Budapest | Singles |

Tibor Klampár (born 30 April 1953) is a former international table tennis player from Hungary.

== Table tennis career ==
From 1970 to 1982 he won several medals in singles, doubles, and team events in the World Table Tennis Championships and in the Table Tennis European Championships. He won the gold medal in a single event of the Table Tennis World Cup in 1981.

Klampár was the first player to use speed glue in the late 1980s. He played Liang Geliang, a top Chinese defender at the time and beat him convincingly after applying speed glue to his racket as Liang, or any of the top Chinese players at the time, had not experienced playing against an opponent using speed glue.

His five World Championship medals included two gold medals in the doubles with István Jónyer at the 1971 World Table Tennis Championships and the team event at the 1979 World Table Tennis Championships.

On the professional tour circuit, Klampar won 10 singles and 12 doubles titles in his career, including two English Open titles.

== Material and playing style ==
Klampár was sponsored by Butterfly, like many of the leading players from Eastern Europe. He used a blade specially made for him, fitted with Super Sriver rubber on both sides, each 2.5 mm thick. He enhanced the performance of the rubbers by attaching them with speed glue, which made the rubber more elastic and allowed him to generate greater spin and speed. He was known for his aggressive close-to-the-table game, using fast forehand and backhand topspins and powerful smashes against high balls.

== See also ==
- List of table tennis players
- List of World Table Tennis Championships medalists
