= Li Zhenshi =

Chinese table tennis player and coach

Li Zhenshi (Li Chen-shih)
Personal information
- Nationality: China
- Born: 29 October 1949 (age 76)

Sport
- Sport: Table tennis
Medal record
Men's table tennis
Representing China
World Championships
Gold medal – first place	1981 Novi Sad	Doubles
Bronze medal – third place	1979 Pyongyang	Singles
Bronze medal – third place	1979 Pyongyang	Doubles
Silver medal – second place	1979 Pyongyang	Mixed
Silver medal – second place	1979 Pyongyang	Team
Gold medal – first place	1977 Birmingham	Doubles
Bronze medal – third place	1977 Birmingham	Mixed
Gold medal – first place	1977 Birmingham	Team
Gold medal – first place	1975 Calcutta	Team

Li Zhenshi (Chinese: 李振恃; pinyin: Lǐ Zhènshì; Wade–Giles: Li^{3} Chen^{4}-shih^{4}), is a Chinese table tennis player and coach.

== Table tennis career ==
From 1974 to 1981, Zhenshi won several medals in singles, doubles, and team events in the Asian Table Tennis Championships and in the World Table Tennis Championships.

His nine World Championship medals included four gold medals; two in the team event and two in the doubles with Liang Geliang and Cai Zhenhua. He also won two English Open titles. He was inducted into the USA Table Tennis Hall of Fame in 2019.

== Personal life ==
After retiring from competitive playing, Zhenshi and his wife Zhang Li moved to the US, where they now direct the World Champions Table Tennis Academy in San Jose, California.

Zhenshi was the coach of the US men's national team which won a bronze medal at the 1995 World Team Cup. He also coached Team USA at the 1996 Olympics.

== See also ==
- List of table tennis players
- List of World Table Tennis Championships medalists
