= Liang Geliang =

Chinese table tennis player

Personal information
- Nationality: China
- Born: 5 May 1950 (age 76) Guangxi Province, China

Sport
- Sport: Table tennis
Medal record
Men's table tennis
Representing China
World Championships
Bronze medal – third place	1979 Pyongyang	Singles
Bronze medal – third place	1979 Pyongyang	Doubles
Gold medal – first place	1979 Pyongyang	Mixed Doubles
Silver medal – second place	1979 Pyongyang	Team
Bronze medal – third place	1977 Birmingham	Singles
Gold medal – first place	1977 Birmingham	Doubles
Gold medal – first place	1977 Birmingham	Team
Bronze medal – third place	1975 Calcutta	Mixed Doubles
Gold medal – first place	1975 Calcutta	Team
Gold medal – first place	1973 Sarajevo	Mixed Doubles
Silver medal – second place	1973 Sarajevo	Team
Silver medal – second place	1971 Nagoya	Doubles
Gold medal – first place	1971 Nagoya	Team
Asian Championships
Silver medal – second place	1978 Kuala Lumpur	Singles
Bronze medal – third place	1978 Kuala Lumpur	Doubles
Bronze medal – third place	1978 Kuala Lumpur	Mixed Doubles
Gold medal – first place	1978 Kuala Lumpur	Team
Gold medal – first place	1976 Pyongyang	Singles
Silver medal – second place	1976 Pyongyang	Doubles
Silver medal – second place	1976 Pyongyang	Mixed Doubles
Gold medal – first place	1976 Pyongyang	Team
Bronze medal – third place	1972 Beijing	Singles
Bronze medal – third place	1972 Beijing	Doubles
Bronze medal – third place	1972 Beijing	Mixed Doubles
Silver medal – second place	1972 Beijing	Team

Liang Geliang (Wade–Giles: Liang Ko-liang) is a former international table tennis player from China.

== Table tennis career ==
From 1971 to 1979 he won many medals in singles, doubles, and team events in the Asian Table Tennis Championships and in the World Table Tennis Championships.

His thirteen World Championship medals included six gold medals; three in the team event, one in the doubles at the 1977 World Table Tennis Championships with Li Zhenshi and two in the mixed doubles with Li Li and Ge Xin'ai, respectively.

== See also ==
- List of table tennis players
- List of World Table Tennis Championships medalists
