= Norio Takashima =

Japanese table tennis player

Personal information
- Nationality: Japan
- Born: 17 July 1951 (age 74)
Medal record
Representing Japan
World Table Tennis Championships
Bronze medal – third place	1973	Men's Team
Bronze medal – third place	1975	Men's Singles
Silver medal – second place	1977	Men's Team
Bronze medal – third place	1979	Men's Team
Bronze medal – third place	1981	Men's Team

Norio Takashima (高島 規郎, Takashima Norio) is a former Japanese international table tennis player.

He won five World Table Tennis Championships medals in five consecutive championships.

== See also ==
- List of table tennis players
- List of World Table Tennis Championships medalists
