= Guo Yuehua =

Chinese table tennis player

Guo Yuehua (Kuo Yao-hua)
Personal information
- Full name: Guo Yuehua
- Nationality: China
- Born: 4 December 1956 (age 69) Tong'an District, Xiamen, Fujian, China

Sport
- Sport: Table tennis
Medal record
Men's table tennis
Representing China
World Championships
Gold medal – first place	1983 Tokyo	Singles
Gold medal – first place	1983 Tokyo	Mixed Doubles
Gold medal – first place	1983 Tokyo	Team
Gold medal – first place	1981 Novi Sad	Singles
Silver medal – second place	1981 Novi Sad	Doubles
Gold medal – first place	1981 Novi Sad	Team
Silver medal – second place	1979 Pyongyang	Singles
Bronze medal – third place	1979 Pyongyang	Doubles
Silver medal – second place	1979 Pyongyang	Team
Silver medal – second place	1977 Birmingham	Singles
Gold medal – first place	1977 Birmingham	Team
World Cup
Gold medal – first place	1982 Hong Kong	Singles
Bronze medal – third place	1981 Kuala Lumpur	Singles
Gold medal – first place	1980 Hong Kong	Singles
Asian Championships
Bronze medal – third place	1982 Jakarta	Singles
Gold medal – first place	1982 Jakarta	Doubles
Silver medal – second place	1982 Jakarta	Mixed Doubles
Gold medal – first place	1982 Jakarta	Team
Bronze medal – third place	1980 Calcutta	Singles
Gold medal – first place	1980 Calcutta	Doubles
Silver medal – second place	1980 Calcutta	Mixed Doubles
Gold medal – first place	1980 Calcutta	Team
Gold medal – first place	1978 Kuala Lumpur	Singles
Silver medal – second place	1978 Kuala Lumpur	Doubles
Silver medal – second place	1978 Kuala Lumpur	Mixed Doubles
Gold medal – first place	1978 Kuala Lumpur	Team
Silver medal – second place	1976 Pyongyang	Singles
Gold medal – first place	1976 Pyongyang	Team

Guo Yuehua (Kuo Yao-hua) is a former Chinese table tennis player.

== Table tennis career ==
From 1976 to 1983, Yuehua won several medals in singles, doubles, and team events in the Asian Table Tennis Championships, Table Tennis World Cup, and World Table Tennis Championships.

The eleven World Championship medals included six gold medals; two in the men's singles at the 1981 World Table Tennis Championships and 1983 World Table Tennis Championships, three in the men's team event and one in the mixed doubles at the 1983 World Table Tennis Championships with Ni Xialian.

== See also ==
- List of table tennis players
- List of World Table Tennis Championships medalists
