= István Jónyer =

Hungarian table tennis player (born 1950)

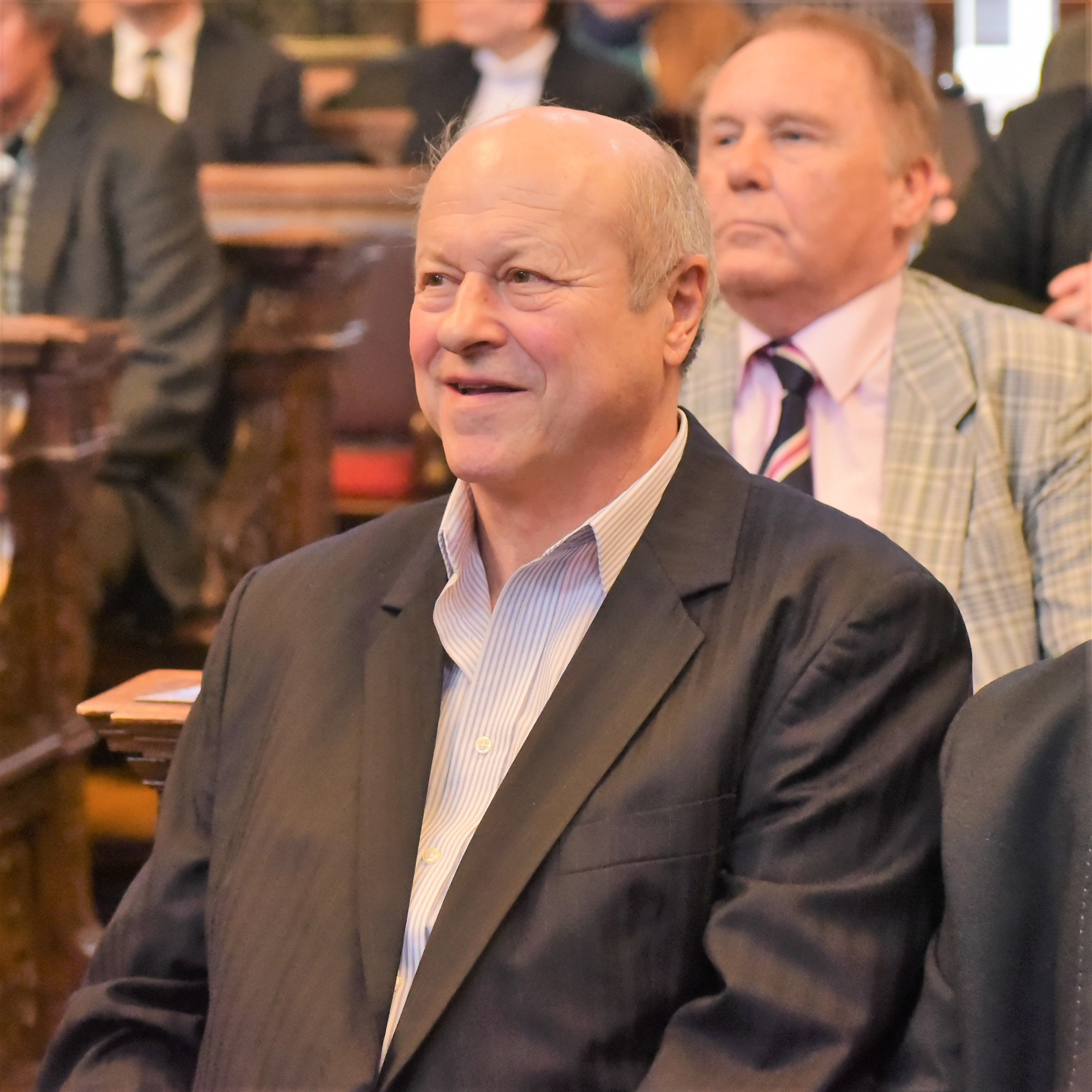
- Jónyer István (2019).

Personal information
- Full name: Jónyer, István
- Nationality: Hungary
- Born: 4 August 1950 (age 75)
- Height: 180 cm (5 ft 11 in)

Sport
- Sport: Table tennis
- Playing style: Right-handed, shakehand grip
- Highest ranking: 1 (January 1977)
Medal record
Men's table tennis
Representing Hungary
World Championships
Bronze medal – third place	1983 Tokyo	Team
Silver medal – second place	1981 Novi Sad	Team
Silver medal – second place	1979 Pyongyang	Doubles
Gold medal – first place	1979 Pyongyang	Team
Gold medal – first place	1975 Calcutta	Singles
Gold medal – first place	1975 Calcutta	Doubles
Silver medal – second place	1973 Sarajevo	Doubles
Gold medal – first place	1971 Nagoya	Doubles
European Championships
Silver medal – second place	1982 Budapest	Doubles
Gold medal – first place	1982 Budapest	Team
Bronze medal – third place	1980 Berne	Doubles
Bronze medal – third place	1980 Berne	Mixed Doubles
Bronze medal – third place	1980 Berne	Team
Silver medal – second place	1978 Duisburg	Singles
Gold medal – first place	1978 Duisburg	Team
Gold medal – first place	1974 Novi Sad	Doubles
Silver medal – second place	1974 Novi Sad	Team
Silver medal – second place	1972 Rotterdam	Singles
Gold medal – first place	1972 Rotterdam	Doubles
Bronze medal – third place	1972 Rotterdam	Mixed Doubles
Bronze medal – third place	1972 Rotterdam	Team
Bronze medal – third place	1970 Moscow	Doubles
Bronze medal – third place	1968 Lyon	Doubles

István Jónyer (born 4 August 1950 in Miskolc) is a former international table tennis player from Hungary. In 1975, Jonyer became the World champion in the singles event.

== Table tennis career ==
He was one of the most dominant players of the sport in the 1970s and famous for inventing the sidespin loop shot. From 1968 to 1983 he won several medals in singles, doubles, and team events in the World Table Tennis Championships and in the Table Tennis European Championships. He is a 4-time World Champion and 4-time European Champion.

His eight World Championship medals include four gold medals: one in the men's singles, another in the men's team event and two in the men's doubles with Tibor Klampár and Gábor Gergely.

On the professional circuit, Jonyer won 4 singles and 11 doubles titles in his career, including the English Open title in the doubles event.

== See also ==
- List of table tennis players
- List of World Table Tennis Championships medalists
