= 1975 World Table Tennis Championships =

1975 edition of the World Table Tennis Championships

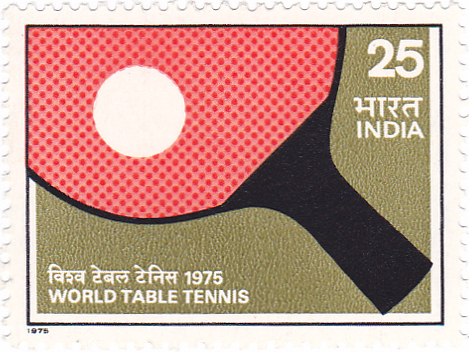
An Indian stamp featured the 1975 World Championships

The 1975 World Table Tennis Championships were held in Calcutta, India, The entire tournament was held at the newly constructed Netaji Indoor Stadium, from 6 February – 16 February 1975.

== Results ==
=== Team ===
Event	Gold	Silver	Bronze
Swaythling Cup; Men's Team	China; Li Peng; Li Zhenshi; Liang Geliang; Lu Yuansheng; Xu Shaofa	Yugoslavia; Milivoj Karakašević; Zoran Kosanović; Miran Savnić; Antun Stipančić; Dragutin Šurbek	Sweden; Stellan Bengtsson; Kjell Johansson; Bo Persson; Ulf Thorsell; Ingemar Wikström
Corbillon Cup; Women's team	China; Ge Xin'ai; Hu Yulan; Zhang Li; Zheng Huaiying	South Korea; Chung Hyun-sook; Kim Soon-ok; Lee Ailesa; Sung Nak-so	Japan; Tomie Edano; Yukie Ozeki; Shoko Takahashi; Sachiko Yokota

=== Individual ===
Event	Gold	Silver	Bronze
Men's singles	(Hungary) István Jónyer	(Socialist Federal Republic of Yugoslavia) Antun Stipančić	(Japan) Mitsuru Kohno
Men's singles	(Hungary) István Jónyer	(Socialist Federal Republic of Yugoslavia) Antun Stipančić	(Japan) Norio Takashima
Women's singles	(North Korea) Pak Yung-Sun	(China) Zhang Li	(Soviet Union) Tatiana Ferdman
Women's singles	(North Korea) Pak Yung-Sun	(China) Zhang Li	(China) Ge Xin'ai
Men's doubles	(Hungary) Gábor Gergely (Hungary) István Jónyer	(Socialist Federal Republic of Yugoslavia) Antun Stipančić (Socialist Federal Republic of Yugoslavia) Dragutin Šurbek	(France) Jean-Denis Constant (France) Jacques Secrétin
Men's doubles	(Hungary) Gábor Gergely (Hungary) István Jónyer	(Socialist Federal Republic of Yugoslavia) Antun Stipančić (Socialist Federal Republic of Yugoslavia) Dragutin Šurbek	(Japan) Katsuyuki Abe (Japan) Shigeo Itoh
Women's doubles	(Romania) Maria Alexandru (Japan) Shoko Takahashi	(China) Zhu Xiangyun (China) Lin Meiqun	(Soviet Union) Elmira Antonyan (Soviet Union) Tatiana Ferdman
Women's doubles	(Romania) Maria Alexandru (Japan) Shoko Takahashi	(China) Zhu Xiangyun (China) Lin Meiqun	(Japan) Yukie Ozeki (Japan) Sachiko Yokota
Mixed doubles	(Soviet Union) Stanislav Gomozkov (Soviet Union) Tatiana Ferdman	(Soviet Union) Sarkis Sarchayan (Soviet Union) Elmira Antonyan	(China) Liang Geliang (China) Zhang Li
Mixed doubles	(Soviet Union) Stanislav Gomozkov (Soviet Union) Tatiana Ferdman	(Soviet Union) Sarkis Sarchayan (Soviet Union) Elmira Antonyan	(Japan) Shigeo Itoh (Japan) Yukie Ozeki
