= 1975 World Table Tennis Championships – Mixed doubles =

1975 Mixed doubles

The 1975 World Table Tennis Championships mixed doubles was the 33rd edition of the mixed doubles championship.

Stanislav Gomozkov and Tatiana Ferdman defeated Sarkis Sarchayan and Elmira Antonyan in the final by three sets to one.

== Results ==
Round of 16
(China) Liang Geliang (China) Chang Li	21	21	21
(Soviet Union) Anatoli Strokatov (Soviet Union) Asta Gedraitite	15	16	16
(China) Li Te-yang (China) Huang Hsi-ping	w/o
(Czechoslovakia) Milan Orlowski (Czechoslovakia) Alica Grofová	scr
(Soviet Union) Sarkis Sarchayan (Soviet Union) Elmira Antonyan	22	21	16	21
(Socialist Federal Republic of Yugoslavia) Antun Stipančić (Socialist Federal Republic of Yugoslavia) Erzsébet Palatinus	20	16	21	16
(China) Li Peng (China) Ke Hsin-ai	13	23	21	21
(Hungary) István Jónyer (Hungary) Judit Magos-Havas	21	21	12	15
(Soviet Union) Stanislav Gomozkov (Soviet Union) Tatiana Ferdman	21	21	21
(Hungary) Gábor Gergely (Hungary) Henriette Lotaller	14	17	16
(China) Lu Yuan-sheng (China) Hu Lu Lan	21	21	21
(China) Li Jingguang (China) Yen Kuei-Li	18	14	16
(Japan) Shigeo Itoh (Japan) Yukie Ohzeki	21	21	21
(Romania) Doru Georghe (Romania) Viorica Moldovan	16	14	9
(France) Jacques Secrétin (France) Claude Bergeret	19	18	17
(China) Li Cho-min (China) Chan Huai-ying	21	21	21

Quarterfinals
(China) Liang Geliang (China) Chang Li	21	21	21
(China) Li Te-yang (China) Huang Xiping	8	13	12
(Soviet Union) Sarkhayan (Soviet Union) Antonyan	21	21	15	21
(China) Li Peng (China) Ke Hsin-ai	15	16	21	15
(Soviet Union) Gomozkov (Soviet Union) Ferdman	9	21	21	21
(China) Lu Yuan-sheng (China) Hu Lu Lan	21	15	14	13
(Japan) Itoh (Japan) Ohzeki	21	21	24
(China) Li Cho-min (China) Chan Huai-ying	12	9	22

Semifinals
(China) Liang Geliang (China) Chang Li	14	19	21	16
(Soviet Union) Sarkhayan (Soviet Union) Antonyan	21	21	15	21
(Soviet Union) Gomozkov (Soviet Union) Ferdman	22	21	21
(Japan) Itoh (Japan) Ozheki	20	11	15

Final
(Soviet Union) Sarkhayan (Soviet Union) Antonyan	13	13	21
(Soviet Union) Gomozkov (Soviet Union) Ferdman	21	21	23

== See also ==
List of World Table Tennis Championships medalists
