= 1977 World Table Tennis Championships – Mixed doubles =

1977 Mixed doubles

The 1977 World Table Tennis Championships mixed doubles was the 34th edition of the mixed doubles championship.

Jacques Secrétin and Claude Bergeret defeated Tokio Tasaka and Sachiko Yokota in the final by three sets to nil.

== Results ==
Round of 16
(Hungary) Gábor Gergely (Hungary) Judit Magos-Havas	21	22	14	19	21
(China) Lu Yuan-sheng (China) Chu Hsiang-tun	16	20	21	21	19
(China) Li Chen-shih (China) Yan Kuai-li	21	19	21	21
(Hungary) Bela Frank (Hungary) Beatrix Kisházi	18	21	16	14
(Czechoslovakia) Milan Orlowski (Czechoslovakia) Ilona Uhlíková	21	21	21
(Bulgaria) Ivan Stojanov (Bulgaria) Emilia Neikova	7	9	9
(Japan) Tokio Tasaka (Japan) Sachiko Yokota	21	21	11	21
(China) Kuo Yao-hua (China) Chang Li	19	12	21	13
(Soviet Union) Sarkis Sarchayan (Soviet Union) Elmira Antonyan	21	21	21
(Soviet Union) Anatoli Strokatov (Soviet Union) Valentina Popova	14	10	11
(France) Jacques Secrétin (France) Claude Bergeret	12	21	13	21	21
(China) Huang Liang (China) Wei Li-chieh	21	19	21	19	16
(South Korea) Lee Sang-kuk (South Korea) Lee Ki-won	21	21	16	21
(Hong Kong) Li Kuang Tsu (Hong Kong) Siu Kit Man	6	8	21	10
(China) Liao Fu-min (China) Li Ming	12	19	11
(Japan) Mitsuru Kono (Japan) Tomie Edano	21	21	21

Quarterfinals
(Hungary) Gergely (Hungary) Magos	21	11	21	22
(China) Li Chen-shih (China) Yan Kuai-Li	23	21	18	24
(Czechoslovakia) Orlowski (Czechoslovakia) Uhlikova	20	21	21	15	11
(Japan) Tasaka (Japan) Yokota	22	18	13	21	21
(Soviet Union) Sarkhayan (Soviet Union) Antonian	14	19	14
(France) Secrétin (France) Bergeret	21	21	21
(South Korea) Lee Sang-kuk (South Korea) Lee Ki-won	21	19	21	21
(Japan) Kono (Japan) Edano	15	21	15	19

Semifinals
(China) Li Chen-shih (China) Yan Kuai-li	20	18	16
(Japan) Tasaka (Japan) Yokota	22	21	21
(France) Secrétin (France) Bergeeret	21	21	18	14	21
(South Korea) Lee Sang-kuk (South Korea) Lee Ki-won	17	15	21	21	10

Final
(Japan) Tasaka (Japan) Yokota	17	14	17
(France) Secrétin (France) Bergeret	21	21	23

== See also ==
List of World Table Tennis Championships medalists
