= 1975 World Table Tennis Championships – Women's doubles =

1975 Women's doubles

The 1975 World Table Tennis Championships women's doubles was the 32nd edition of the women's doubles championship. Maria Alexandru and Shoko Takahashi defeated Chu Hsiang-Yun and Lin Mei Chun in the final by three sets to one.

== Results ==
Round of 16
(China) Hu Yu-Lan (China) Ke Hsin Ai	13	21	21	21
(Japan) Yukie Ozeki (Japan) Sachiko Yokota	21	17	14	11
(Bulgaria) Albertina Rangelova (Bulgaria) Emilia Neykova	17	21	17	9
(Socialist Federal Republic of Yugoslavia) Dubravka Fabri (Socialist Federal Republic of Yugoslavia) Erzebet Korpa	21	5	21	21
(Romania) Magalena Lesay (Romania) Viorica Moldovan	5	19	17
(China) Chu Hsiang-Yun (China) Lin Mei Chun	21	21	21
(South Korea) Chung Hyun-sook (South Korea) Sim Kyung-ok	19	21	21	23
(Socialist Federal Republic of Yugoslavia) Erzsébet Palatinus (Socialist Federal Republic of Yugoslavia) Eva Jeler	21	13	15	21
(Czechoslovakia) Alica Grofová (Czechoslovakia) Hana Riedlová	21	21	21
(China) Chang Li (China) Cheng Huai Ying	14	12	13
(France) Claude Bergeret (France) Brigitte Thiriet	17	9	14
(Romania) Maria Alexandru (Japan) Shoko Takahashi	21	21	21
(Japan) Tomie Edano (Japan) Chieko Ono	21	21	21
(West Germany) Wiebke Hendriksen (West Germany) Jana Eberle	19	15	17
(Soviet Union) Tatiana Ferdman (Soviet Union) Elmira Antonyan	23	14	21	21
(South Korea) Sung Nak-so (South Korea) Son Hye Soon	21	21	15	12

Quarterfinals
(Japan) Ozeki (Japan) Yokota	21	21	21
(Socialist Federal Republic of Yugoslavia) Fabri (Socialist Federal Republic of Yugoslavia) Korpa	12	14	18
(China) Chu Hsiang-Yun (China) Lin Mei Chun	21	21	21
(South Korea) Chung Hyun-sook (South Korea) Sim Kyung-ok	13	7	12
(Czechoslovakia) Grófová (Czechoslovakia) Riedlová	21	21	13	18	20
(Romania) Alexandru (Japan) Takahashi	17	14	21	21	22
(Japan) Edano (Japan) Ono	21	12	18	21	16
(Soviet Union) Ferdman (Soviet Union) Antonyan	17	21	21	19	21

Semifinals
(Japan) Ozeki (Japan) Yokota	16	14	12
(China) Chu Hsiang-Yun (China) Lin Mei Chun	21	21	21
(Romania) Alexandru (Japan) Takahashi	21	21	21
(Soviet Union) Ferdman (Soviet Union) Antonyan	19	18	15

Final
(China) Chu Hsiang-Yun (China) Lin Mei Chun	18	21	11	11
(Romania) Alexandru (Japan) Takahashi	21	9	21	21

== See also ==
List of World Table Tennis Championships medalists
