= 1977 World Table Tennis Championships – Women's doubles =

1977 Women's doubles

The 1977 World Table Tennis Championships women's doubles was the 33rd edition of the women's doubles championship. Pak Yong-ok and Yang Ying defeated Chu Hsiang-Yun and Wei Li-Chieh in the final by three sets to one.

== Results ==
Round of 16
(China) Chang Li (China) Ke Hsin Ai	21	21	21
(Bulgaria) Albertina Rangelova (Bulgaria) Emilia Neykova	14	12	9
(Sweden) Ann-Christin Hellman (Sweden) Eva Strömvall	9	21	21	16	21
(Romania) Maria Alexandru (Czechoslovakia) Ilona Uhlíková	21	18	19	21	6
(West Germany) Wiebke Hendricksen (Hungary) Beatrix Kisházi	20	21	21	21
(France) Claude Bergeret (France) Brigitte Thiriet	21	13	17	14
(North Korea) Pak Yong-ok (China) Yang Ying	21	12	21	21
(South Korea) Chung Hyun-sook (South Korea) Lee Ailesa	11	12	14	11
(Soviet Union) Zoja Rudnova (Soviet Union) Elmira Antonyan	14	21	21	21
(Hong Kong) Chang Siu Ying (Hong Kong) Siu Kit Man	21	11	9	18
(Soviet Union) Tatiana Ferdman (Soviet Union) Valentina Popova	9	15	15
(China) Chu Hsiang-Yun (China) Wei Li-Chieh	21	21	21
(South Korea) Kim Soon-ok (South Korea) Lee Ki-won	21	23	21	21
(Japan) Kayoko Kawahigashi (Japan) Sachiko Yokota	3	21	23	16
(China) Yen Kuei-li (China) Li Ming	21	21	21
(Poland) Weronika Sikora (Poland) Jolanta Szatko	10	5	13

Quarterfinals
(China) Chang Li (China) Ke Hsin Ai	21	21	21
(Sweden) Hellman (Sweden) Strömvall	11	11	10
(West Germany) Hendricksen (Hungary) Kisházi	15	12	17
(North Korea) Pak Yong-ok (China) Yang Ying	21	21	21
(Soviet Union) Rodnova (Soviet Union) Antonyan	10	9	19
(China) Chu Hsiang-Yun (China) Wei Li-Chieh	21	21	21
(South Korea) Kim Soon-ok (South Korea) Lee Ki-won	21	13	21	22	21
(China) Yen Kuei-li (China) Li Ming	18	21	14	24	10

Semifinals
(China) Chang Li (China) Ke Hsin Ai	13	18	13
(North Korea) Pak Yong-ok (China) Yang Ying	21	21	21
(China) Chu Hsiang-Yun (China) Wei Li-Chieh	21	21	21
(South Korea) Kim Soon-ok (South Korea) Lee Ki-won	12	11	10

Final
(North Korea) Pak Yong-ok (China) Yang Ying	21	26	16	21
(China) Chu Hsiang-Yun (China) Wei Li-Chieh	18	24	21	13

== See also ==
List of World Table Tennis Championships medalists
