= 1977 World Table Tennis Championships =

1977 edition of the World Table Tennis Championships

The 1977 World Table Tennis Championships were held in Birmingham at the then newly opened National Exhibition Centre, from March 26 to April 5, 1977.

== Organisation ==
During these Championships, players and officials stayed at the Student Accommodation at the University of Birmingham in Edgbaston, from where coaches took all participants backwards and forwards between here and the NEC daily for the two weeks of the championships. Although run by the ETTA for the ITTF, headed by Mr Maurice Goldstein, Management, Tournament & Coaching Committee members from the BDTTA (Birmingham & District Table Tennis Association) played a major part with six months of preparatory work prior to this event, the first to be held at the NEC. It was also from the BDTTA that many gave freely of their time to help run this championship, through their expertise of running many other local annual table tennis tournaments, such at the 3 star Midlands Open and Birmingham Closed.

== Results ==
=== Team ===
Event	Gold	Silver	Bronze
Swaythling Cup; Men's Team	China; Guo Yuehua; Huang Liang; Li Zhenshi; Liang Geliang; Wang Jun	Japan; Tetsuo Inoue; Mitsuru Kono; Masahiro Maehara; Norio Takashima; Tokio Tasaka	Sweden; Stellan Bengtsson; Ake Gronlund; Kjell Johansson; Roger Lagerfeldt; Ulf Thorsell
Corbillon Cup; Women's team	China; Ge Xinai; Zhang Deying; Zhang Li; Zhu Xiangyun	South Korea; Chung Hyun-sook; Kim Soon-ok; Lee Ailesa; Lee Ki Won	North Korea; Kim Chang-Ae; Li Song Suk; Pak Yong-Ok; Pak Yung-Sun

=== Individual ===
Event	Gold	Silver	Bronze
Men's singles	(Japan) Mitsuru Kohno	(China) Guo Yuehua	(China) Liang Geliang
Men's singles	(Japan) Mitsuru Kohno	(China) Guo Yuehua	(China) Huang Liang
Women's singles	(North Korea) Pak Yung-Sun	(China) Zhang Li	(China) Ge Xin'ai
Women's singles	(North Korea) Pak Yung-Sun	(China) Zhang Li	(China) Zhang Deying
Men's doubles	(China) Li Zhenshi (China) Liang Geliang	(China) Huang Liang (China) Lu Yuansheng	(Sweden) Stellan Bengtsson (Sweden) Kjell Johansson
Men's doubles	(China) Li Zhenshi (China) Liang Geliang	(China) Huang Liang (China) Lu Yuansheng	(Socialist Federal Republic of Yugoslavia) Antun Stipančić (Socialist Federal Republic of Yugoslavia) Dragutin Šurbek
Women's doubles	(North Korea) Pak Yong-ok (China) Yang Ying	(China) Zhu Xiangyun (China) Wei Lijie	(China) Zhang Li (China) Ge Xin'ai
Women's doubles	(North Korea) Pak Yong-ok (China) Yang Ying	(China) Zhu Xiangyun (China) Wei Lijie	(South Korea) Lee Ki Won (South Korea) Kim Soon-ok
Mixed doubles	(France) Jacques Secrétin (France) Claude Bergeret	(Japan) Tokio Tasaka (Japan) Sachiko Yokota	(China) Li Zhenshi (China) Yan Guili
Mixed doubles	(France) Jacques Secrétin (France) Claude Bergeret	(Japan) Tokio Tasaka (Japan) Sachiko Yokota	(South Korea) Lee Sang-kuk (South Korea) Lee Ki Won
