= 1973 World Table Tennis Championships – Mixed doubles =

1973 Mixed doubles

The 1973 World Table Tennis Championships mixed doubles was the 32nd edition of the mixed doubles championship.

Liang Geliang and Li Li defeated Anatoli Strokatov and Asta Gedraitite in the final by three sets to one.

== Results ==
Round of 16
(Socialist Federal Republic of Yugoslavia) Antun Stipančić (Romania) Maria Alexandru	21	21	21
(Poland) Czeslawa Noworyta (Poland) Witold Woznica	13	13	10
(Czechoslovakia) Josef Dvořáček (Czechoslovakia) Alica Grofová	21	25	21
(Hungary) István Jónyer (Hungary) Judit Magos-Havas	12	23	15
(Japan) Mitsuru Kono (Japan) Sachiko Yokota	21	21	21
(Romania) Șerban Doboși (Romania) Elenora Vlaicov	14	10	15
(West Germany) Eberhard Schöler (West Germany) Diane Schöler	8	21	8	10
(China) Liang Geliang (China) Li Li	21	15	21	21
(China) Yo Yi-Tse (China) Chang Li	9	21	20	21	21
(South Korea) Choi Sung Kuk (South Korea) Lee Ailesa	21	13	22	16	17
(China) Ya Chang Chun (China) Cheng Huai Ying	21	21	21
(Japan) Masahiko Ohya (Japan) Yoshiko Takase	17	18	14
(Japan) Tokio Tasaka (Japan) Yukie Ohzeki	21	21	21
(France) Jacques Secrétin (France) Claude Bergeret	16	14	13
(Soviet Union) Anatoli Strokatov (Soviet Union) Asta Gedraitite	19	21	16	21	21
(China) Chan Hsien Lin (China) Cheng Min-Chih	21	15	21	14	18

Quarterfinals
(Socialist Federal Republic of Yugoslavia) Stipančić (Romania) Alexandru	22	13	21	19	15
(Czechoslovakia) Dvořáček (Czechoslovakia) Grófová	20	21	13	21	21
(Japan) Kono (Japan) Yokota	17	13	18
(China) Liang Geliang (China) Li Li	21	21	21
(China) Yo Ti-Tse (China) Chang Li	17	17	14
(China) Yo Chang Chun (China) Cheng Huai Ying	21	21	21
(Japan) Tasaka (Japan) Ohzeki	15	18	21	15
(Soviet Union) Strokatov (Soviet Union) Gedraitite	21	21	12	21

Semifinals
(Czechoslovakia) Dvořáček (Czechoslovakia) Grófová	18	17	17
(China) Liang Geliang (China) Li Li	21	21	21
(China) Yo Chang Chun (China) Cheng Huai Ying	21	14	20	12
(Soviet Union) Strokatov (Soviet Union) Gedraitite	15	21	22	21

Final
(China) Liang Geliang (China) Li Li	21	21	17	21
(Soviet Union) Strokatov (Soviet Union) Gedraitite	13	18	21	19

== See also ==
List of World Table Tennis Championships medalists
