= 1973 World Table Tennis Championships =

1973 edition of the World Table Tennis Championships

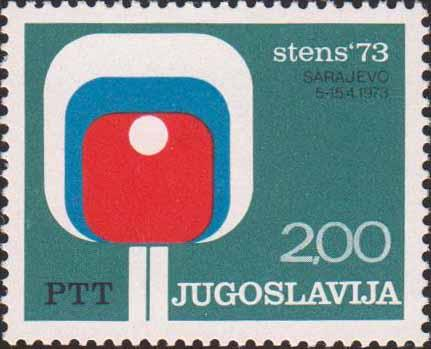
A stamp of Yugoslavia dedicated to the 1973 World Table Tennis Championships

The 1973 World Table Tennis Championships were held in Sarajevo from April 5 to April 15, 1973.

== Medalists ==
=== Team ===
| Event | Gold | Silver | Bronze |
|---|---|---|---|
| Swaythling Cup; Men's Team | Sweden; Stellan Bengtsson; Anders Johansson; Kjell Johansson; Bo Persson; Ingemar Wikström | China; Diao Wenyuan; Li Jingguang; Liang Geliang; Xi Enting; Xu Shaofa | Japan; Nobuhiko Hasegawa; Yujiro Imano; Mitsuru Kohno; Norio Takashima; Tokio Tasaka |
| Corbillon Cup; Women's team | South Korea; Chung Hyun-sook; Kim Soon-ok; Lee Ailesa; Park Mi-ra | China; Hu Yulan; Zhang Li; Zheng Huaiying; Zheng Minzhi | Japan; Tomie Edano; Miho Hamada; Yukie Ohzeki; Sachiko Yokota |

=== Individual ===
| Event | Gold | Silver | Bronze |
|---|---|---|---|
| Men's singles | (China) Xi Enting | (Sweden) Kjell Johansson | (Socialist Federal Republic of Yugoslavia) Antun Stipančić |
| Men's singles | (China) Xi Enting | (Sweden) Kjell Johansson | (Socialist Federal Republic of Yugoslavia) Dragutin Šurbek |
| Women's singles | (China) Hu Yulan | (Czechoslovakia) Alica Grofová | (China) Zhang Li |
| Women's singles | (China) Hu Yulan | (Czechoslovakia) Alica Grofová | (South Korea) Park Mi-ra |
| Men's doubles | (Sweden) Stellan Bengtsson (Sweden) Kjell Johansson | (Hungary) István Jónyer (Hungary) Tibor Klampár | (France) Jean-Denis Constant (France) Jacques Secrétin |
| Men's doubles | (Sweden) Stellan Bengtsson (Sweden) Kjell Johansson | (Hungary) István Jónyer (Hungary) Tibor Klampár | (Socialist Federal Republic of Yugoslavia) Antun Stipančić (Socialist Federal Republic of Yugoslavia) Dragutin Šurbek |
| Women's doubles | (Romania) Maria Alexandru (Japan) Miho Hamada | (China) Qiu Baoqin (China) Lin Meiqun | (Japan) Tazuko Abe (Japan) Tomie Edano |
| Women's doubles | (Romania) Maria Alexandru (Japan) Miho Hamada | (China) Qiu Baoqin (China) Lin Meiqun | (England) Jill Hammersley (Hungary) Beatrix Kisházi |
| Mixed doubles | (China) Liang Geliang (China) Li Li | (Soviet Union) Anatoli Strokatov (Soviet Union) Asta Gedraitite | (China) Yu Changchun (China) Zheng Huaiying |
| Mixed doubles | (China) Liang Geliang (China) Li Li | (Soviet Union) Anatoli Strokatov (Soviet Union) Asta Gedraitite | (Czechoslovakia) Josef Dvořáček (Czechoslovakia) Alica Grofová |
