= 1975 World Table Tennis Championships – Women's team =

1975 Corbillon Cup (women's team)

The 1975 World Table Tennis Championships – Corbillon Cup (women's team) was the 26th edition of the women's team championship.

China won the gold medal, South Korea won the silver medal and Japan won the bronze medal.

== Medalists ==
Event	Gold	Silver	Bronze
	China; Ke Hsin-ai; Hu Yu-lan; Chang Li; Cheng Huai Ying	South Korea; Chung Hyun-sook; Kim Soon-ok; Lee Ailesa; Sung Nak-so	Japan; Tomie Edano; Yukie Ozeki; Shoko Takahashi; Sachiko Yokota

== Final tables ==
=== Group A ===
Pos	Team	P	W	L	Pts
1	South Korea	7	7	0	14
2	Hungary	7	6	1	12
3	Soviet Union	7	5	2	10
4	Czechoslovakia	7	4	3	8
5	France	7	3	4	6
6	Sweden	7	2	5	4
7	Indonesia	7	1	6	2
8	India	7	0	7	0

=== Group B ===
Pos	Team	P	W	L	Pts
1	China	7	7	0	14
2	Japan	7	6	1	12
3	England	7	4	3	8
4	(Socialist Federal Republic of Yugoslavia) Yugoslavia	7	4	3	8
5	West Germany	7	3	4	6
6	Romania	7	2	5	4
7	Bulgaria	7	1	6	2
8	Poland	7	1	6	2

== Semifinals ==
Team One	Team Two	Score
South Korea	Japan	3–0
China	Hungary	3–0

== Third-place playoff ==
Team One	Team Two	Score
Japan	Hungary	3–2

== Final ==
China 3		South Korea 2	Score
Chang Li	bt	Lee Ailesa	21–18 21–14
Ke Hsin-ai	bt	Chung Hyun-sook	19–21 21–10 22–20
Hu Yu-lan & Ke Hsin-ai	lost to	Chung Hyun-sook & Lee Ailesa	15–21 21–23
Chang Li	lost to	Chung Hyun-sook	16–21 20–22
Ke Hsin-ai	bt	Lee Ailesa	21–14 21–10

== See also ==
- List of World Table Tennis Championships medalists
