= 1973 World Table Tennis Championships – Men's doubles =

1973 Men's doubles

The 1973 World Table Tennis Championships men's doubles was the 32nd edition of the men's doubles championship. Stellan Bengtsson and Kjell Johansson won the title after defeating István Jónyer and Tibor Klampár in the final by three sets to two.

== Results ==
Round of 16
(China) Chuang Tse-tung (China) Liang Ko-liang	21	21	21
(England) Desmond Douglas (Sweden) Anders Johansson	14	19	11
(Sweden) Stellan Bengtsson (Sweden) Kjell Johansson	21	21	21
(Romania) Șerban Doboși (Romania) Teodor Doru Gheorge	12	8	19
(Socialist Federal Republic of Yugoslavia) Milivoj Karakašević (Socialist Federal Republic of Yugoslavia) Istvan Korpa	23	13	21	21
(Soviet Union) Stanislav Gomozkov (Soviet Union) Sarkis Sarchayan	21	21	17	18
(France) Jacques Secrétin (France) Jean-Denis Constant	21	21	21
(China) Ho Chui-pin (China) Li Fu-jung	13	17	13
(China) Hsi En-ting (China) Wang Wen-hua	16	11	21	22	21
(Japan) Mitsuru Kono (Japan) Tokio Tasaka	21	21	19	20	8
(Socialist Federal Republic of Yugoslavia) Dragutin Šurbek (Socialist Federal Republic of Yugoslavia) Antun Stipančić	21	21	23
(France) Patrick Birocheau (France) Régis Canor	7	18	21
(China) Tian wen-yuan (China) Yu Yi-tse	22	21	21
(Soviet Union) Bagrat Bernazian (Soviet Union) Anatoli Strokatov	20	14	18
(Hungary) István Jónyer (Hungary) Tibor Klampár	21	22	21
(Socialist Federal Republic of Yugoslavia) Zlatko Cordas (Socialist Federal Republic of Yugoslavia) Zoran Kosanović	16	20	13

Quarterfinals
(China) Chuang Tse-tung (China) Liang Ko-liang	21	21	19	22
(Sweden) Bengtsson (Sweden) Johansson	23	18	21	24
(Socialist Federal Republic of Yugoslavia) Karakašević (Socialist Federal Republic of Yugoslavia) Korpa	18	20	21	21	13
(France) Secretin (France) Constant	21	22	18	12	21
(China) Hsi En-ting (China) Wang Wen-hua	21	16	21	7	13
(Socialist Federal Republic of Yugoslavia) Stipančić (Socialist Federal Republic of Yugoslavia) Šurbek	15	21	16	21	21
(China) Tian wen-yuan (China) Yu Yi-tse	21	22	21	21
(Hungary) Jónyer (Hungary) Klampár	23	20	23	23

Semifinals
(Sweden) Bengtsson (Sweden) Johansson	21	21	21
(France) Secrétin (France) Constant	13	17	11
(Socialist Federal Republic of Yugoslavia) Stipančić (Socialist Federal Republic of Yugoslavia) Šurbek	21	20	19	21
(Hungary) Jónyer (Hungary) Klampar	14	22	21	23

Final
(Sweden) Bengtsson (Sweden) Johansson	21	15	21	18	21
(Hungary) Jónyer (Hungary) Klampár	15	21	19	21	15

== See also ==
List of World Table Tennis Championships medalists
