= 1973 World Table Tennis Championships – Women's singles =

1973 Women's singles

The 1973 World Table Tennis Championships women's singles was the 32nd edition of the women's singles championship. Hu Yu Lan defeated Alica Grofová in the final by three sets to nil, to win the title.

== Results ==
Round of 16
(China) Cheng Min Chin	16	21	15	21	19
(Soviet Union) Elmira Antonyan	21	15	21	16	21
(Czechoslovakia) Alica Grofová	11	17	21	21	21
(Hungary) Beatrix Kisházi	21	21	15	19	14
(South Korea) Park Mi-ra	21	17	21	24
(Japan) Tomie Edano	18	21	17	22
(China) Cheng Huai-ying	20	9	21	19
(Japan) Yukie Ozeki	22	21	7	21
(China) Hu Yu Lan	21	24	21
(Romania) Maria Alexandru	12	22	11
(Sweden) Birgita Radberg	17	21	21	21
(China) Lin Mei-chun	21	9	16	15
(China) Chang Li	21	21	19	21
(Czechoslovakia) Blanka Silhanova	14	13	21	16
(South Korea) Chung Hyun-sook	21	21	21
(Czechoslovakia) Hana Riedlová	10	15	13

Quarterfinals
(Soviet Union) Antonian	19	8	11
(Czechoslovakia) Grófová	21	21	21
(South Korea) Park Mi-ra	23	12	21	21
(Japan) Ozeki	21	21	16	19
(China) Hu Yu Lan	21	15	16	21	21
(Sweden) Radberg	14	21	21	18	12
(China) Chang Li	18	20	21	21	21
(South Korea) Chung Hyun-sook	21	22	18	11	8

Semifinals
(Czechoslovakia) Grófová	21	21	19	21
(South Korea) Park Mi Ra	19	18	21	14
(China) Hu Yu Lan	21	15	21	21
(China) Chang Li	14	21	16	16

Final
(Czechoslovakia) Grófová	17	11	14
(China) Hu Yu Lan	21	21	21

== See also ==
List of World Table Tennis Championships medalists
