= 1975 World Table Tennis Championships – Men's team =

Table tennis competition

1975 Swaythling Cup (men's team)

The 1975 World Table Tennis Championships – Swaythling Cup (men's team) was the 33rd edition of the men's team championship.

China won the gold medal defeating Yugoslavia 5–3 in the final. Sweden won the bronze medal.

== Medalists ==
Event	Gold	Silver	Bronze
	China; Li Peng; Li Chen-shih; Liang Geliang; Lu Yuan-sheng; Hsu Shao-fa	Yugoslavia; Milivoj Karakašević; Zoran Kosanović; Miran Savnić; Antun Stipančić; Dragutin Šurbek	Sweden; Stellan Bengtsson; Kjell Johansson; Bo Persson; Ulf Thorsell; Ingemar Wikström

== Swaythling Cup tables ==
=== Group A ===
Pos	Team	P	W	L	Pts
1	Czechoslovakia	7	7	0	14
2	Sweden	7	6	1	12
3	Soviet Union	7	5	2	10
4	West Germany	7	4	3	8
5	South Korea	7	3	4	6
6	France	7	2	5	4
7	Denmark	7	1	6	2
8	Austria	7	0	7	0

=== Group B ===
Pos	Team	P	W	L	Pts
1	China	7	7	0	14
2	(Socialist Federal Republic of Yugoslavia) Yugoslavia	7	6	1	12
3	Hungary	7	5	2	10
4	Japan	7	4	3	8
5	England	7	3	4	6
6	Romania	7	2	5	4
7	Indonesia	7	1	6	2
8	India	7	0	7	0

== Semifinals ==
Team One	Team Two	Score
Yugoslavia	Czechoslovakia	5–3
China	Sweden	5–2

== Third-place playoff ==
Team One	Team Two	Score
Sweden	Czechoslovakia	5–4

== Final ==
China 5		(Socialist Federal Republic of Yugoslavia) Yugoslavia 3	Score
Lu Yuan-sheng	lost to	Stipančić	26–28 17–21
Li Chen-shih	bt	Karakašević	21–16 21–19
Hsu Shao-fa	lost to	Šurbek	23–21 16–21 14–21
Li Chen-shih	bt	Stipančić	21–12 21–8
Lu Yuan-sheng	bt	Šurbek	21–10 22–20
Hsu Shao-fa	bt	Karakašević	21–14 21–17
Li Chen-shih	lost to	Šurbek	20–22 17–21
Hsu Shao-fa	bt	Stipančić	21–16 21–13

== See also ==
List of World Table Tennis Championships medalists
