= 1973 World Table Tennis Championships – Women's team =

1973 Corbillon Cup (women's team)

The 1973 World Table Tennis Championships – Corbillon Cup (women's team) was the 25th edition of the women's team championship.

South Korea won the gold medal, China won the silver medal and Japan won the bronze medal.

== Medalists ==
Event	Gold	Silver	Bronze
	South Korea; Chung Hyun-sook; Kim Soon-ok; Lee Ailesa; Park Mi-ra	China; Hu Yulan; Zhang Li; Zheng Huaiying; Zheng Minzhi	Japan; Tomie Edano; Miho Hamada; Yukie Ohzeki; Sachiko Yokota

== Final tables ==
=== Group A ===
Pos	Team	P	W	L	Pts
1	Japan	6	6	0	12
2	Hungary	6	5	1	10
3	Soviet Union	6	4	2	8
4	Czechoslovakia	6	3	3	6
5	England	6	2	4	4
6	Indonesia	6	1	5	2
7	Austria	6	0	6	0

=== Group B ===
Pos	Team	P	W	L	Pts
1	South Korea	6	6	0	12
2	China	6	5	1	10
3	Romania	6	4	2	8
4	West Germany	6	2	4	4
5	Sweden	6	2	4	4
6	(Socialist Federal Republic of Yugoslavia) Yugoslavia	6	1	5	2
7	France	6	0	6	0

== Final group ==
Pos	Team	P	W	L	Pts
1	South Korea	3	3	0	6
2	China	3	2	1	4
3	Japan	3	1	2	2
4	Hungary	3	0	3	0

== See also ==
List of World Table Tennis Championships medalists
