= 1975 World Table Tennis Championships – Women's singles =

1975 Women's singles

The 1975 World Table Tennis Championships women's singles was the 33rd edition of the women's singles championship. Pak Yung-sun defeated Chang Li in the final by three sets to one, to win the title.

== Results ==
Round of 16
(North Korea) Pak Yung-sun	21	17	21	21	21
(Hungary) Henriette Lotaller	23	21	17	11	16
(South Korea) Chung Hyun-sook	21	17	21	24
(Czechoslovakia) Hana Riedlová	9	21	17	22
(Romania) Maria Alexandru	17	21	21	21
(China) Huang Hsi-Ping	21	18	18	18
(Soviet Union) Tatiana Ferdman	15	21	16	21	23
(Japan) Yukie Ozeki	21	10	21	19	21
(Socialist Federal Republic of Yugoslavia) Erzsebet Palatinus	19	21	14	21	21
(China) Cheng Huai-Ying	21	13	21	15	17
(China) Ke Hsin Ai	21	16	21	21
(Soviet Union) Elmira Antonyan	15	21	18	11
(China) Chu Hsiang-Yun	11	21	21	21
(Japan) Sachiko Yokota	21	7	8	11
(China) Chang Li	21	21	21
(Romania) Magalena Lesay	12	14	8

Quarterfinals
(North Korea) Pak Yung-sun	13	21	20	21	23
(South Korea) Chung Hyun-sook	21	19	22	16	21
(Romania) Alexandru	12	15	16
(Soviet Union) Ferdman	21	21	21
(Socialist Federal Republic of Yugoslavia) Palatinus	9	9	8
(China) Ke Hsin Ai	21	21	21
(China) Chu Hsiang Yun	7	17	16
(China) Chang Li	21	21	21

Semifinals
(North Korea) Pak Yung-sun	10	21	17	21	21
(Soviet Union) Ferdman	21	11	21	19	11
(China) Ke Hsin Ai	17	13	13
(China) Chang Li	21	21	21

Final
(North Korea) Pak Yung-sun	22	21	21	21
(China) Chang Li	24	12	14	15

== See also ==
List of World Table Tennis Championships medalists
