= 1977 World Table Tennis Championships – Men's team =

1977 Swaythling Cup (men's team)

The 1977 World Table Tennis Championships – Swaythling Cup (men's team) was the 34th edition of the men's team championship.

China won the gold medal defeating Japan 5–0 in the final. Sweden won the bronze medal.

== Medalists ==
Event	Gold	Silver	Bronze
	China; Kuo Yao-hua; Huang Liang; Li Chen-shih; Liang Ke-liang; Wang Jun	Japan; Tetsuo Inoue; Mitsuru Kohno; Masahiro Maehara; Norio Takashima; Tokio Tasaka	Sweden; Stellan Bengtsson; Ake Gronlund; Kjell Johansson; Roger Lagerfeldt; Ulf Thorsell

== Swaythling Cup tables ==
=== Group A ===
Pos	Team	P	W	L	Pts
1	China	7	7	0	7
2	Hungary	7	6	1	6
3	West Germany	7	5	2	5
4	Czechoslovakia	7	4	3	4
5	France	7	3	4	3
6	England	7	2	5	2
7	Indonesia	7	1	6	1
8	Australia	7	0	7	0

=== Group B ===
Pos	Team	P	W	L	Pts
1	Japan	7	7	0	7
2	Sweden	7	6	1	6
3	(Socialist Federal Republic of Yugoslavia) Yugoslavia	7	5	2	5
4	Soviet Union	7	4	3	4
5	Poland	7	2	5	2
6	South Korea	7	2	5	2
7	Denmark	7	2	5	2
8	Romania	7	0	7	0

== Semifinals ==
Team One	Team Two	Score
Japan	Hungary	5–3
China	Sweden	5–0

== Third-place playoff ==
Team One	Team Two	Score
Sweden	Hungary	5–1

== Final ==
China 5		Japan 0	Score
Huang Liang	bt	Maehara	21–16 21–14
Huang Liang	bt	Kono	21–13 21–15
Liang Ke-liang	bt	Kono	21–3 12–21 21–11
Kuo Yao-hua	bt	Takashima	21–8 21–7
Kuo Yao-hua	bt	Maehara	21–11 23–21

== See also ==
- List of World Table Tennis Championships medalists
