= 1977 World Table Tennis Championships – Women's team =

1977 Corbillon Cup (women's team)

The 1977 World Table Tennis Championships – Corbillon Cup (women's team) was the 27th edition of the women's team championship.

China won the gold medal defeating South Korea 3–0 in the final, North Korea won the bronze medal.

== Medalists ==
Event	Gold	Silver	Bronze
	China; Ke Hsin-ai; Chang Te-ying; Chang Li; Chu Hsiang-Yun	South Korea; Chung Hyun-sook; Kim Soon-ok; Lee Ailesa; Lee Ki Won	North Korea; Kim Chang-Ae; Li Song Suk; Pak Yong-Ok; Pak Yung-Sun

== Final tables ==
=== Group 1 ===
Pos	Team	P	W	L	Pts
1	China	8	8	0	8
2	North Korea	8	7	1	7
3	Hungary	8	6	2	6
4	England	8	5	3	5
5	Czechoslovakia	8	3	5	3
6	Sweden	8	3	5	3
7	Romania	8	3	5	3
8	Bulgaria	8	1	7	1
9	Belgium	8	0	8	0

=== Group 2 ===
Pos	Team	P	W	L	Pts
1	South Korea	8	8	0	8
2	Japan	8	7	1	7
3	Soviet Union	8	6	2	6
4	Hong Kong	8	5	3	5
5	France	8	4	4	4
6	West Germany	8	3	5	3
7	(Socialist Federal Republic of Yugoslavia) Yugoslavia	8	2	6	2
8	Poland	8	1	7	1
9	Indonesia	8	0	8	0

== Semifinals ==
Team One	Team Two	Score
South Korea	North Korea	3–1
China	Japan	3–0

== Third Place Play Off ==
Team One	Team Two	Score
North Korea	Japan	3–0

== Final ==
China 3		South Korea 0	Score
Chang Li	bt	Lee Ailesa	21–10 21–12
Chang Te-ying	bt	Chung Hyun-sook	23–21 21–13
Chang Te-ying & Chang Li	bt	Chung Hyun-sook & Lee Ailesa	21–17 21–16

== See also ==
List of World Table Tennis Championships medalists
