= 1975 World Table Tennis Championships – Men's doubles =

1975 Men's doubles

The 1975 World Table Tennis Championships men's doubles was the 33rd edition of the men's doubles championship.

István Jónyer and Gábor Gergely won the title after defeating Dragutin Šurbek and Antun Stipančić in the final by three sets to one.

== Results ==
Round of 16
(Sweden) Stellan Bengtsson (Sweden) Kjell Johansson	21	15	22	19
(Indonesia) Sugeng Soewindo (Indonesia) Gunawan Sutedja	11	21	24	21
(France) Jacques Secrétin (France) Jean-Denis Constant	21	20	15	21	21
(West Germany) Jochen Leiss (West Germany) Peter Stellwag	19	22	21	16	19
(China) Hsi En-ting (China) Lu Yuansheng	21	21	21
(Czechoslovakia) Milan Orlowski (Czechoslovakia) Jiri Turai	12	16	10
(Hungary) István Jónyer (Hungary) Gábor Gergely	21	18	12	21	21
(Poland) Witold Woźnica (Poland) Stanislaw Frączyk	10	21	21	17	15
(Socialist Federal Republic of Yugoslavia) Dragutin Šurbek (Socialist Federal Republic of Yugoslavia) Antun Stipančić	22	21	18	21
(Czechoslovakia) Jaroslav Kunz (Czechoslovakia) Pavel Ovcarik	20	12	21	15
(China) Liang Geliang (China) Li Cho-Min	21	21	23
(Denmark) Claus Pedersen (Denmark) Bjarne Grimstrup	11	9	4
(Japan) Shigeo Itoh (Japan) Katsuyuki Abe	21	21	21
(Australia) Paul Pinkewich (Australia) Bob Tuckett	7	18	13
(Sweden) Ingemar Wikström (Sweden) Bo Persson	9	13	18
(Soviet Union) Sarkis Sarchayan (Soviet Union) Stanislav Gomozkov	21	21	21

Quarterfinals
(Indonesia) Soewindo (Indonesia) Sutedja	19	9	3
(France) Secrétin (France) Constant	21	21	21
(China) Hsi En-ting (China) Lu Yuansheng	15	20	18
(Hungary) Jónyer (Hungary) Gergely	21	22	21
(China) Liang Geliang (China) Li Cho-Min	21	16	15	21	14
(Socialist Federal Republic of Yugoslavia) Stipančić (Socialist Federal Republic of Yugoslavia) Šurbek	16	21	21	15	21
(Japan) Itoh (Japan) Abe	22	13	16	21	24
(Soviet Union) Sarchayan (Soviet Union) Gomozkov	20	21	21	16	22

Semifinals
(France) Secrétin (France) Constant	21	10	21	12	22
(Hungary) Jónyer (Hungary) Gergely	18	21	10	21	24
(Socialist Federal Republic of Yugoslavia) Stipančić (Socialist Federal Republic of Yugoslavia) Šurbek	21	21	22	21
(Japan) Itoh (Japan) Abe	16	14	24	13

Final
(Hungary) Jónyer (Hungary) Gergely	21	19	21	21
(Socialist Federal Republic of Yugoslavia) Stipančić (Socialist Federal Republic of Yugoslavia) Šurbek	14	21	16	16

== See also ==
- List of World Table Tennis Championships medalists
