= 1977 World Table Tennis Championships – Women's singles =

1977 Women's singles

The 1977 World Table Tennis Championships women's singles was the 34th edition of the women's singles championship. Pak Yung-sun defeated Chang Li in the final by three sets to nil, to win the title.

== Results ==
Round of 16
(North Korea) Pak Yung-sun	21	21	21
(Romania) Maria Alexandru	10	14	8
(Hungary) Beatrix Kisházi	17	8	11
(China) Chu Hsiang-Yun	21	21	21
(South Korea) Chung Hyun-sook	21	21	16	21
(Hungary) Gabriella Szabo	15	14	21	14
(China) Ke Hsin Ai	23	21	21
(North Korea) Li Song-suk	21	16	11
(China) Chang Te-Ying	21	21	21
(South Korea) Kim Soon-ok	16	7	16
(West Germany) Ursula Hirschmuller	15	9	21	21	22
(Czechoslovakia) Ilona Uhlíková	21	21	18	17	20
(Japan) Kayoko Kawahigashi	16	24	22	26
(Sweden) Ann-Christin Hellman	21	22	20	24
(China) Chang Li	18	17	21	21	23
(South Korea) Lee Ailesa	21	21	11	16	21

Quarterfinals
(North Korea) Pak Yung-sun	23	21	21
(China) Chu Hsian-Yun	21	19	16
(South Korea) Chun Hyun-sook	12	14	12
(China) Ke Hsin-Ai	21	21	21
(China) Chang Te-Ying	21	21	21
(West Germany) Hirschmuller	11	10	10
(Japan) Kawahigashi	8	14	11
(China) Chang Li	21	21	21

Semifinals
(North Korea) Pak Yung-sun	21	21	13	21
(China) Ke Hsin-Ai	18	18	21	18
(China) Chang Te-Ying	19	21	18	18
(China) Chang Li	21	14	21	21

Final
(North Korea) Pak Yung-sun	21	24	22
(China) Chang Li	15	22	20

== See also ==
List of World Table Tennis Championships medalists
