= Wang Jun =

Wang Jun may refer to:

== Political and military ==
- Wang Jun (Jin dynasty) (王濬) (206–286), Chinese general of the Jin Dynasty
- Wang Jun (Pengzu) (王浚 (彭祖)) (252–314), Chinese general of the Jin Dynasty, and governor of Youzhou
- Wang Jun (Tang chancellor) (王晙) (died 732), Chinese chancellor of the Tang Dynasty
- Wang Jun (Later Zhou chancellor) (王峻) (902–953), Chinese chancellor of the Later Zhou Dynasty
- Wang Jun (politician, born 1952) (王君), Chinese politician, party chief of Inner Mongolia, former governor of Shanxi
- Wang Jun (politician, born 1958) (王军), Chinese politician, director of the State Administration of Taxation
- Wang Jun (politician, born 1964) (王峻), Chinese politician, former deputy chairperson of Tibet Autonomous Region People's Congress

== Businessmen ==
- Wang Jun (businessman) (王军) (born 1941), Chinese businessman, former executive of China International Trust and Investment Corporation
- Wang Jun (scientist) (王俊) (born 1976), CEO of iCarbonX

== Sportspeople ==
- Wang Jun (table tennis) (王俊, born 1953), Chinese table tennis player
- Wang Jun (basketball) (王军, born 1963), Chinese women's basketball player
- Wang Jun (parathlete) (王君) (born 1990), female Chinese Paralympic athlete

=== Association footballers ===
- Wang Jun (footballer, born 1966) (王俊), coach of Chinese football club Tianjin Teda
- Wang Jun (footballer, born 1976) (王军), former Chinese football player for Tianjin Teda
- Wang Jun (footballer, born April 1990) (王君), Chinese football player for Dalian Aerbin
- Wang Jun (footballer, born July 1990) (王军), Chinese football player for Guizhou Zhicheng

== Others ==
- Wang Jun (physician) (born 1963), Chinese surgeon
