= 1973 World Table Tennis Championships – Men's singles =

1973 Men's singles

The 1973 World Table Tennis Championships men's singles was the 32nd edition of the men's singles championship.

Hsi En-ting defeated Kjell Johansson in the final, winning three sets to two to secure the title.

== Results ==
Round of 16
(China) Hsi En-ting	21	23	21
(Soviet Union) Stanislav Gomozkov	16	21	14
(Czechoslovakia) Milan Orlowski	15	21	17	21	21
(Japan) Mitsuru Kono	21	16	21	18	6
(China) Li Fu-Jung	19	13	21
(Socialist Federal Republic of Yugoslavia) Antun Stipančić	21	21	23
(Hungary) Janos Borzsey	21	21	21
(Japan) Yujiro Imano	18	15	11
(France) Jacques Secrétin	16	21	21	21
(China) Liang Ko-Liang	21	11	19	8
(Socialist Federal Republic of Yugoslavia) Dragutin Šurbek	21	21	22
(Japan) Masayuki Kuze	17	13	20
(Sweden) Kjell Johansson	18	21	22	21
(Socialist Federal Republic of Yugoslavia) Istvan Korpa	21	16	20	16
(Soviet Union) Sarkis Sarchayan	21	21	21
(England) Denis Neale	17	18	12

Quarterfinals
(China) En-ting	21	21	16	21
(Czechoslovakia) Orlowski	18	15	21	15
(Socialist Federal Republic of Yugoslavia) Stipančić	19	21	21	21
(Hungary) Borzsey	21	13	18	11
(France) Secretin	16	12	19
(Socialist Federal Republic of Yugoslavia) Šurbek	22	21	21
(Sweden) Johansson	21	21	21
(Soviet Union) Sarkhoyan	19	19	11

Semifinals
(China) En-ting	21	21	12	20	21
(Socialist Federal Republic of Yugoslavia) Stipančić	19	19	21	22	19
(Socialist Federal Republic of Yugoslavia) Šurbek	20	21	13	21	16
(Sweden) Johansson	22	16	21	13	21

Final
(China) En-ting	21	13	13	21	21
(Sweden) Johansson	18	21	21	19	18

== See also ==
List of World Table Tennis Championships medalists
