= Andonian =

Andonian (Armenian: Անտոնեան) is a patronymic surname that follows Armenian name conventions. Notable people with this name include the following:

- Aram Andonian (1875 – 1951), Armenian journalist, historian and writer
- Gaël Andonian (born 1995), Armenian footballer

== See also ==
- Elmira Antonyan
- Andorian
