= Miran Savnić =

Yugoslav table tennis player

Miran Savnik
Personal information
- Nationality: Yugoslavia
Medal record
Representing Yugoslavia
World Table Tennis Championships
Silver medal – second place	1975	team

Miran Savnik is a male former international table tennis player from Yugoslavia.

== Table tennis career ==
He won the golden medal in the Cadets category - individuals- at the European Youth Championship held in Vejle, Denmark in 1972. He also won a silver medal at the 1975 World Table Tennis Championships with Milivoj Karakašević, Zoran Kosanović, Antun Stipančić and Dragutin Šurbek as part of the Yugoslav team. He was later the head coach / trainer of the Maribor team - in his hometown of Maribor, Slovenia.

== See also ==
- List of table tennis players
- List of World Table Tennis Championships medalists
