= Sung Nak-so =

South Korean table tennis player

Medal record
Representing South Korea
World Table Tennis Championships
Silver medal – second place	1975	Women's Team

Sung Nak-so is a female former international table tennis player from South Korea.

== Table tennis career ==
She won a silver medal in the Corbillon Cup (women's Team event) at the 1975 World Table Tennis Championships with Chung Hyun-sook, Lee Ailesa and Kim Soon-ok for South Korea.

== See also ==
- List of World Table Tennis Championships medalists
