= 1973 World Table Tennis Championships – Men's team =

1973 Swaythling Cup (men's team)

The 1973 World Table Tennis Championships – Swaythling Cup (men's team) was the 32nd edition of the men's team championship.

Sweden won the gold medal by virtue of winning the final group. Despite losing one of the matches against the Soviet Union they topped the group with a superior match record. China took silver and Japan bronze.

== Medalists ==
Event	Gold	Silver	Bronze
Men's team	Sweden; Stellan Bengtsson; Anders Johansson; Kjell Johansson; Bo Persson; Ingemar Wikström	China; Tiao Wen-yuan; Li Ching-kuang; Liang Ko-liang; Hsi En-ting; Hsu Shao-Fa	Japan; Nobuhiko Hasegawa; Yujiro Imano; Mitsuru Kohno; Norio Takashima; Tokio Tasaka

== Swaythling Cup tables ==
=== Group A ===
Pos	Team	P	W	L	Pts
1	Sweden	6	6	0	12
2	China	6	5	1	10
3	Hungary	6	4	2	8
4	South Korea	6	3	3	6
5	Indonesia	6	2	4	4
6	Austria	6	1	5	2
7	India	6	0	6	0

=== Group B ===
Pos	Team	P	W	L	Pts
1	Japan	6	6	0	12
2	Soviet Union	6	5	1	10
3	Czechoslovakia	6	4	2	8
4	(Socialist Federal Republic of Yugoslavia) Yugoslavia	6	3	3	6
5	West Germany	6	2	4	4
6	England	6	1	5	2
7	France	6	0	6	0

== Final group ==
Team One	Team Two	Score
Japan	Sweden	3–5
China	Sweden	4–5
Soviet Union	Sweden	5–4
Soviet Union	Japan	2–5
Soviet Union	China	4–5
Japan	China	4–5

=== Final group ===
Pos	Team	P	W	L	F	A	Pts
1	Sweden	3	2	1	14	12	4
2	China	3	2	1	14	13	4
3	Japan	3	1	2	12	12	2
4	Soviet Union	3	1	2	11	14	2

== See also ==
List of World Table Tennis Championships medalists
