= 1977 World Table Tennis Championships – Men's singles =

1977 World Table Tennis Championships

1977 Men's singles

The 1977 World Table Tennis Championships men's singles was the 34th edition of the men's singles championship.

Mitsuru Kono defeated Kuo Yao-hua in the final, winning three sets to one to secure the title.

== Results ==
Round of 16
(France) Patrick Birocheau	20	11	6
(Japan) Mitsuru Kono	22	21	21
(Sweden) Stellan Bengtsson	16	21	18	21	21
(West Germany) Wilfried Lieck	21	16	21	16	19
(Socialist Federal Republic of Yugoslavia) Dragutin Šurbek	19	22	22	21
(China) Wang Chien-chang	21	20	20	17
(China) Liang Ko-Liang	21	21	21
(Czechoslovakia) Milan Orlowski	10	14	8
(China) Huang Liang	21	15	13	21	21
(France) Jacques Secrétin	12	21	21	17	17
(Hungary) Gábor Gergely	21	16	21	21	21
(Sweden) Kjell Johansson	15	21	19	10	15
(Hungary) Tibor Klampár	20	21	21	21
(Socialist Federal Republic of Yugoslavia) Antun Stipančić	22	6	17	17
(China) Kuo Yao-hua	21	22	21
(Japan) Norio Takashima	17	20	15

Quarterfinals
(Japan) Kono	20	21	23	21	21
(Sweden) Bengtsson	22	18	25	15	19
(Socialist Federal Republic of Yugoslavia) Šurbek	21	21	9	16	18
(China) Ko-Liang	16	12	21	21	21
(China) Huang Liang	21	21	21
(Hungary) Gergely	9	19	13
(Hungary) Klampár	20	18	21	21	19
(China) Yao-hua	22	21	11	15	21

Semifinals
(Japan) Kono	21	21	21
(China) Ko-Liang	19	14	11
(China) Huang Liang	17	15	15
(China) Yao-hua	21	21	21

Final
(Japan) Kono	17	21	21	21
(China) Yao-hua	21	9	19	13

== See also ==
List of World Table Tennis Championships medalists
