= List of China table tennis squads at the Olympics =

This list includes China PR players and coaches who participated the Summer Olympics.

== 1988 Seoul ==
=== Men's ===
	Name	Birthdate	Partner	Singles	Doubles
Head coach	Xu Shaofa	1945 (age 42-43)			
Coach	Xi Enting	1946 (age 41-42)			
Player	Jiang Jialiang	03/03/1964 (age 24)	Xu Zengcai	5	5
Player	Chen Longcan	03/21/1965 (age 23)	Wei Qingguang	6	1st place, gold medalist(s)
Player	Xu Zengcai	10/1961 (age 26)	Jiang Jialiang	R16	5
Player	Wei Qingguang	07/02/1962 (age 26)	Chen Longcan		1st place, gold medalist(s)

=== Women's ===
	Name	Birthdate	Partner	Singles	Doubles
Head coach	Zhang Xielin	1940 (age 47-48)			
Coach	Ma Jinbao				
Player	Chen Jing	09/20/1968 (age 20)	Jiao Zhimin	1st place, gold medalist(s)	2nd place, silver medalist(s)
Player	Jiao Zhimin	12/01/1963 (age 24)	Chen Jing	3rd place, bronze medalist(s)	2nd place, silver medalist(s)
Player	Li Huifen	10/04/1963 (age 25)		5	

== 1992 Barcelona ==
=== Men's ===
	Name	Birthdate	Partner	Singles	Doubles
Head coach	Cai Zhenhua	09/03/1961 (age 30)			
Coach	Lu Yuansheng	10/07/1954 (age 37)			
Player	Ma Wenge	03/27/1968 (age 24)	Yu Shentong	3rd place, bronze medalist(s)	QF
Player	Wang Tao	12/13/1967 (age 24)	Lü Lin	QF	1st place, gold medalist(s)
Player	Lü Lin	04/06/1969 (age 23)	Wang Tao	S1	1st place, gold medalist(s)
Player	Yu Shentong	1968 (age 23-24)	Ma Wenge		QF

=== Women's ===
	Name	Birthdate	Partner	Singles	Doubles
Head coach	Zhang Xielin	1940 (age 51-52)			
Coach	Zeng Chuanqiang				
Player	Deng Yaping	02/05/1973 (age 19)	Qiao Hong	1st place, gold medalist(s)	1st place, gold medalist(s)
Player	Qiao Hong	11/21/1968 (age 23)	Deng Yaping	3rd place, bronze medalist(s)	1st place, gold medalist(s)
Player	Liu Wei	10/1969 (age 22)	Qiao Yunping		3rd place, bronze medalist(s)
Player	Qiao Yunping	09/13/1968 (age 23)	Liu Wei	4	3rd place, bronze medalist(s)

== 1996 Atlanta ==
=== Men's ===
	Name	Birthdate	Partner	Singles	Doubles
Head coach	Cai Zhenhua	09/03/1961 (age 34)			
Coach	Li Xiaodong	1952 (age 43-44)			
Player	Kong Linghui	10/18/1975 (age 20)	Liu Guoliang	R16	1st place, gold medalist(s)
Player	Wang Tao	12/13/1967 (age 28)	Lü Lin	2nd place, silver medalist(s)	2nd place, silver medalist(s)
Player	Liu Guoliang	01/10/1976 (age 20)	Kong Linghui	1st place, gold medalist(s)	1st place, gold medalist(s)
Player	Lü Lin	04/06/1969 (age 27)	Wang Tao		1st place, gold medalist(s)

=== Women's ===
	Name	Birthdate	Partner	Singles	Doubles
Head coach	Lu Yuansheng	10/07/1954 (age 42)			
Coach	Zeng Chuanqiang				
Player	Qiao Hong	11/21/1968 (age 27)	Deng Yaping	2nd place, silver medalist(s)	1st place, gold medalist(s)
Player	Deng Yaping	02/05/1973 (age 23)	Qiao Hong	1st place, gold medalist(s)	1st place, gold medalist(s)
Player	Chen Zihe	02/29/1968 (age 24)	Gao Jun	QF	2nd place, silver medalist(s)
Player	Gao Jun	02/25/1969 (age 23)	Chen Zihe		2nd place, silver medalist(s)

== 2000 Sydney ==
=== Men's ===
	Name	Birthdate	Partner	Singles	Doubles
Head coach	Cai Zhenhua	09/03/1961 (age 39)			
Coach	Li Xiaodong	1952 (age 47-48)			
Coach	Lü Lin	04/06/1969 (age 31)			
Player	Liu Guoliang	01/10/1976 (age 24)	Kong Linghui	3rd place, bronze medalist(s)	2nd place, silver medalist(s)
Player	Kong Linghui	10/18/1975 (age 24)	Liu Guoliang	1st place, gold medalist(s)	2nd place, silver medalist(s)
Player	Wang Liqin	06/18/1978 (age 22)	Yan Sen		1st place, gold medalist(s)
Player	Yan Sen	08/16/1975 (age 25)	Wang Liqin		1st place, gold medalist(s)
Player	Liu Guozheng	03/07/1980 (age 20)		QF	

=== Women's ===
	Name	Birthdate	Partner	Singles	Doubles
Head coach	Lu Yuansheng	10/07/1954 (age 45)			
Coach	Shi Zhihao	09/26/1959 (age 41)			
Player	Wang Nan	10/23/1978 (age 21)	Li Ju	1st place, gold medalist(s)	1st place, gold medalist(s)
Player	Li Ju	01/22/1976 (age 24)	Wang Nan	2nd place, silver medalist(s)	1st place, gold medalist(s)
Player	Sun Jin	03/13/1980 (age 20)	Yang Ying	R32	2nd place, silver medalist(s)
Player	Yang Ying	07/13/1977 (age 23)	Sun Jin		2nd place, silver medalist(s)

== 2004 Athens ==
=== Men's ===
	Name	Birthdate	Partner	Singles	Doubles
Head coach	Liu Guoliang	01/10/1976 (age 28)			
Coach	Wu Jingping	05/09/1954 (age 50)			
Player	Ma Lin	02/19/1980 (age 24)	Chen Qi	R16	1st place, gold medalist(s)
Player	Wang Liqin	06/18/1978 (age 26)		3rd place, bronze medalist(s)	
Player	Kong Linghui	10/18/1975 (age 28)	Wang Hao		R16
Player	Wang Hao	12/01/1983 (age 20)	Kong Linghui	2nd place, silver medalist(s)	R16
Player	Chen Qi	04/15/1983 (age 21)	Ma Lin		1st place, gold medalist(s)

=== Women's ===
	Name	Birthdate	Partner	Singles	Doubles
Head coach	Lu Yuansheng	10/07/1954 (age 49)			
Coach	Shi Zhihao	09/26/1959 (age 44)			
Coach	Li Sun	07/12/1963 (age 41)			
Coach	Qiao Hong	11/21/1968 (age 35)			
Player	Wang Nan	10/23/1978 (age 25)	Zhang Yining	QF	1st place, gold medalist(s)
Player	Zhang Yining	10/05/1981 (age 22)	Wang Nan	1st place, gold medalist(s)	1st place, gold medalist(s)
Player	Niu Jianfeng	04/03/1981 (age 23)	Guo Yue	R16	3rd place, bronze medalist(s)
Player	Guo Yue	07/17/1988 (age 16)	Niu Jianfeng		3rd place, bronze medalist(s)

== 2008 Beijing ==
=== Men's ===
	Name	Birthdate	Singles	Teams
Head coach	Liu Guoliang	01/10/1976 (age 32)		
Coach	Li Xiaodong	1952 (age 55-56)		
Coach	Wu Jingping	05/09/1954 (age 54)		
Player	Wang Hao	12/01/1983 (age 24)	2nd place, silver medalist(s)	1st place, gold medalist(s)
Player	Ma Lin	02/19/1980 (age 28)	1st place, gold medalist(s)	1st place, gold medalist(s)
Player	Wang Liqin	06/18/1978 (age 30)	3rd place, bronze medalist(s)	1st place, gold medalist(s)
Alternate	Chen Qi	04/15/1983 (age 25)		

=== Women's ===
	Name	Birthdate	Singles	Teams
Head coach	Shi Zhihao	09/26/1959 (age 48)		
Coach	Li Sun	07/12/1963 (age 45)		
Coach	Kong Linghui	10/18/1975 (age 32)		
Player	Zhang Yining	10/05/1981 (age 26)	1st place, gold medalist(s)	1st place, gold medalist(s)
Player	Wang Nan	10/23/1978 (age 29)	2nd place, silver medalist(s)	1st place, gold medalist(s)
Player	Guo Yue	07/17/1988 (age 20)	3rd place, bronze medalist(s)	1st place, gold medalist(s)
Alternate	Li Xiaoxia	06/21/1988 (age 20)		

== 2012 London ==
=== Men's ===
	Name	Birthdate	Singles	Teams
Head coach	Liu Guoliang	01/10/1976 (age 36)		
Coach	Qin Zhijian	10/05/1976 (age 35)		
Player	Ma Long	10/20/1988 (age 23)		1st place, gold medalist(s)
Player	Wang Hao	12/01/1983 (age 28)	2nd place, silver medalist(s)	1st place, gold medalist(s)
Player	Zhang Jike	02/16/1988 (age 24)	1st place, gold medalist(s)	1st place, gold medalist(s)
Alternate	Xu Xin	01/08/1990 (age 22)		

=== Women's ===
	Name	Birthdate	Singles	Teams
Head coach	Shi Zhihao	09/26/1959 (age 52)		
Coach	Li Sun	07/12/1963 (age 49)		
Player	Ding Ning	06/20/1990 (age 22)	2nd place, silver medalist(s)	1st place, gold medalist(s)
Player	Guo Yue	07/17/1988 (age 24)		1st place, gold medalist(s)
Player	Li Xiaoxia	06/21/1988 (age 24)	1st place, gold medalist(s)	1st place, gold medalist(s)
Alternate	Liu Shiwen	04/12/1991 (age 21)		

== 2016 Rio de Janeiro ==
=== Men's ===
	Name	Birthdate	Singles	Teams
Head coach	Liu Guoliang	01/10/1976 (age 40)		
Coach	Qin Zhijian	10/05/1976 (age 39)		
Player	Ma Long	10/20/1988 (age 27)	1st place, gold medalist(s)	1st place, gold medalist(s)
Player	Xu Xin	01/08/1990 (age 26)		1st place, gold medalist(s)
Player	Zhang Jike	02/16/1988 (age 28)	2nd place, silver medalist(s)	1st place, gold medalist(s)
Alternate	Fan Zhendong	01/22/1997 (age 19)		

=== Women's ===
	Name	Birthdate	Singles	Teams
Head coach	Kong Linghui	10/18/1975 (age 40)		
Coach	Li Sun	07/12/1963 (age 53)		
Player	Li Xiaoxia	06/21/1988 (age 28)	2nd place, silver medalist(s)	1st place, gold medalist(s)
Player	Ding Ning	06/20/1990 (age 26)	1st place, gold medalist(s)	1st place, gold medalist(s)
Player	Liu Shiwen	04/12/1991 (age 25)		1st place, gold medalist(s)
Alternate	Zhu Yuling	01/10/1995 (age 21)		

== 2020 Tokyo ==
=== Men's ===
	Name	Birthdate	Partner	Singles	Mixed Doubles	Teams
Head coach	Qin Zhijian	01/10/1976 (age 45)				
Coach						
Player	Fan Zhendong	01/22/1997 (age 24)		2nd place, silver medalist(s)		1st place, gold medalist(s)
Player	Ma Long	10/20/1988 (age 32)		1st place, gold medalist(s)		1st place, gold medalist(s)
Player	Xu Xin	01/08/1990 (age 31)	Liu Shiwen		2nd place, silver medalist(s)	1st place, gold medalist(s)
Alternate	Wang Chuqin					

Women's

	Name	Birthdate	Partner	Singles	Mixed Doubles	Teams
Head coach	Li Sun	07/12/1963 (age 53)				
Coach	Ma Lin	02/19/1980 (age 28)				
Player	Chen Meng			2nd place, silver medalist(s)		1st place, gold medalist(s)
Player	Sun Yingsha			1st place, gold medalist(s)		1st place, gold medalist(s)
Player	Liu Shiwen	04/12/1991 (age 30)	Xu Xin		2nd place, silver medalist(s)	
Alternate	Wang Manyu					1st place, gold medalist(s)

Notes:
QF=Quarter Final
R=Round
S=Stage

== See also ==
- China national table tennis team
