= Park Mi-ra (table tennis) =

South Korean table tennis player

Personal information
- Nationality: South Korea
- Born: 4 January 1952 (age 74)
Medal record
Representing South Korea
World Table Tennis Championships
| Gold medal – first place | 1973 | Women's team |
| Bronze medal – third place | 1973 | Women's singles |

Park Mi-ra is a female South Korean former international table tennis player.

== Table tennis career ==
She won a bronze medal in the women's singles and a gold medal in the Corbillon Cup (women's team event) at the 1973 World Table Tennis Championships with Chung Hyun-sook, Lee Ailesa and Kim Soon-ok for South Korea.

== See also ==
- List of table tennis players
- List of World Table Tennis Championships medalists
