= Wang Jun (politician, born 1964) =

Chinese politician (born 1964)

- 王峻

Deputy Chairperson of Tibet Autonomous Region People's Congress
- In office January 2018 – December 2025

Personal details
- Born: February 1964 (age 62) Pingliang, Gansu, China
- Party: Chinese Communist Party (1987-2026, expelled)
- Education: Xinjiang University of Finance & Economics

Wang Jun (Chinese: 王峻; born February 1964) is a former Chinese female politician, who served as the deputy chairperson of Tibet Autonomous Region People's Congress from 2018 to 2025.

== Career ==
Wang was born in Pingliang, Gansu. Her career is most at Ngari Prefecture. In 2000, she was appointed as the deputy commissioner of Ngari Prefecture Administrative Office. She was appointed as the director of the Department of Land and Resources of Tibet Autonomous Region in 2008.

In June 2016, Wang was appointed as the deputy secretary of the Tibet Autonomous Region Discipline Inspection Commission. In January 2018, Wang was appointed as the deputy chairperson of Tibet Autonomous Region People's Congress.

== Investigation ==
On 24 December 2025, Wang was put under investigation for alleged "serious violations of discipline and laws" by the Central Commission for Discipline Inspection (CCDI), the party's internal disciplinary body, and the National Supervisory Commission, the highest anti-corruption agency of China. She was expelled from the party and dismissed from the public office on 23 July 2026.
