= Lee Sang-kuk =

South Korean table tennis player

Personal information
- Nationality: South Korea
Medal record
Representing South Korea
World Table Tennis Championships
Bronze medal – third place	1977	Mixed Doubles

Lee Sang-kuk is a male former international table tennis player from Korea.

He won a bronze medal at the 1977 World Table Tennis Championships in the mixed doubles with Lee Ki-won.

== See also ==
- List of table tennis players
- List of World Table Tennis Championships medalists
