= Anders Johansson (table tennis) =

Swedish table tennis player (born 1955)

Personal information
- Nationality: Sweden
- Born: 10 January 1955 (age 71)
Medal record
Men's table tennis
Representing Sweden
World Table Tennis Championships
Gold medal – first place	1973 Sarajevo	Men's team

Anders Johansson (born 10 January 1955) is a Swedish former international table tennis player and coach.

== Table tennis career ==
He won a gold medal in the Swaythling Cup (men's team event) at the 1973 World Table Tennis Championships as part of the Sweden team that contained Ingemar Wikström, Kjell Johansson, Stellan Bengtsson and Bo Persson.

He also won two gold medals in the European Table Tennis Championships.

== See also ==
- List of table tennis players
- List of World Table Tennis Championships medalists
