= Ulf Thorsell =

Swedish table tennis player

Personal information
- Nationality: Sweden
- Born: 18 March 1956
- Died: 8 June 2021 (aged 65)
Medal record
Representing Sweden
World Table Tennis Championships
Bronze medal – third place	1975	Men's Team
Bronze medal – third place	1977	Men's Team

Ulf Thorsell (18 March 1956 – 8 June 2021) was a male former international table tennis player from Sweden.

He won a bronze medal at the 1975 World Table Tennis Championships in the Swaythling Cup (men's team event) with Stellan Bengtsson, Kjell Johansson, Bo Persson and Ingemar Wikström for Sweden.

He won another bronze medal two years later at the 1977 World Table Tennis Championships in the Swaythling Cup (men's team event) with Bengtsson, Kjell Johansson, Ake Gronlund and Roger Lagerfeldt.

He also won two European Table Tennis Championships medals in 1976 and 1980.

== See also ==
- List of table tennis players
- List of World Table Tennis Championships medalists
