= Åke Grönlund =

Swedish table tennis player

Personal information
- Nationality: Sweden
Medal record
Representing Sweden
World Table Tennis Championships
Bronze medal – third place	1977	Men's Team

Åke Grönlund is a male former international table tennis player from Sweden.

He won a bronze medal at the 1977 World Table Tennis Championships in the Swaythling Cup (men's team event) with Stellan Bengtsson, Kjell Johansson, Roger Lagerfeldt and Ulf Thorsell for Sweden.

== See also ==
- List of table tennis players
- List of World Table Tennis Championships medalists
