= Katsuyuki Abe =

Japanese table tennis player

Personal information
- Nationality: Japan
Medal record
Representing Japan
World Table Tennis Championships
Bronze medal – third place	1971	doubles
Bronze medal – third place	1975	doubles

Katsuyuki Abe (阿部 勝幸, Abe Katsuyuki) is a former international table tennis player from Japan.

== Career ==
=== Table tennis ===
He won a bronze medal at the 1971 World Table Tennis Championships with Yujiro Imano and another with Shigeo Itoh at the 1975 World Table Tennis Championships.

== See also ==
- List of table tennis players
- List of World Table Tennis Championships medalists
