= Ursula Kamizuru =

German table tennis player

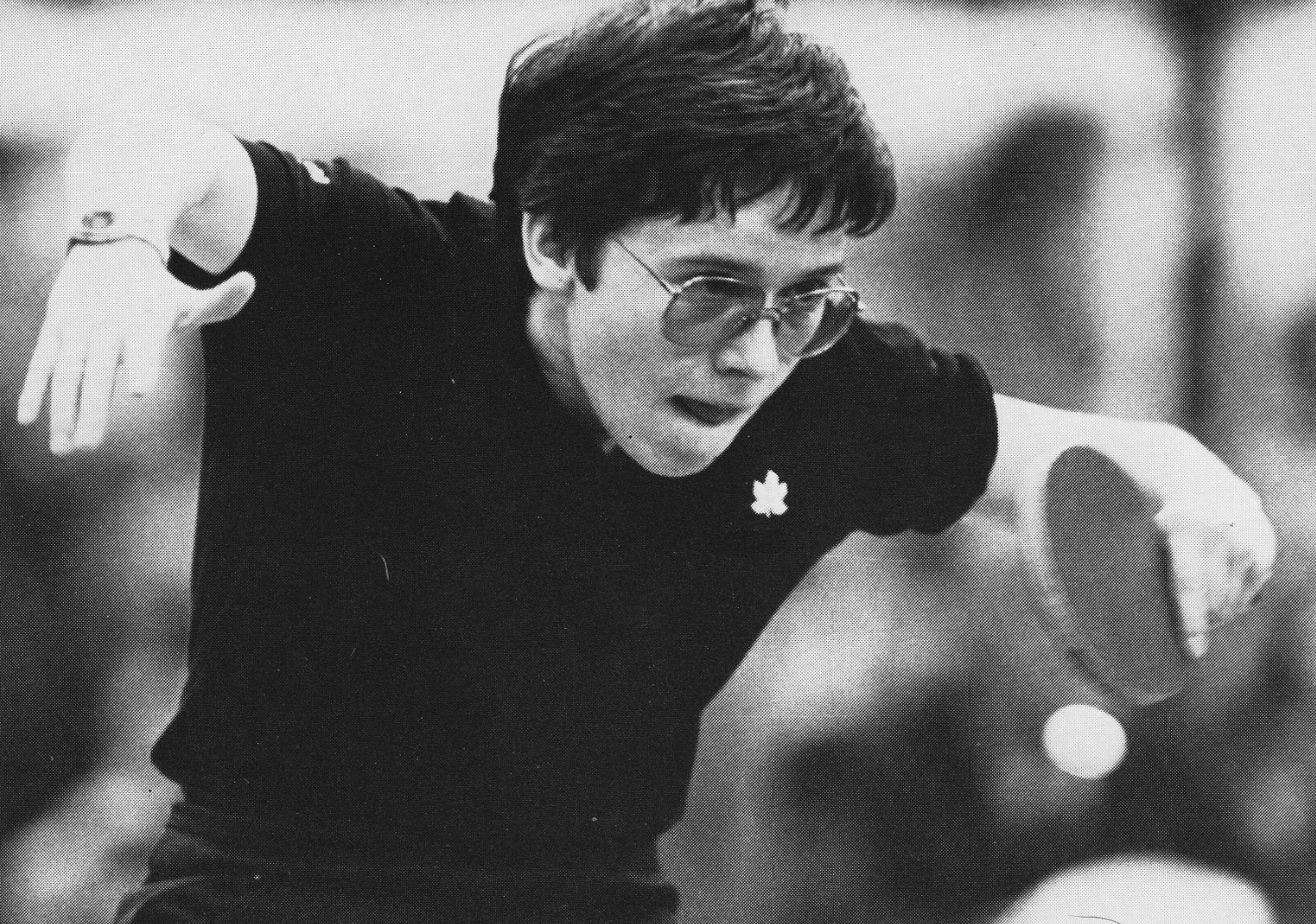

Personal information
- Nickname: Uschi
- Born: 7 November 1953 Sennfeld, West Germany
- Died: 5 August 2008 (aged 54) Wesel, Germany
- Height: 1.49 m (4 ft 11 in)

Sport
- Country: Germany
- Sport: Table tennis
Medal record
Table tennis
Representing Germany
European Championships
Silver medal – second place	1982 Budapest	Women's singles
Bronze medal – third place	1982 Budapest	Women's team

Ursula Kamizuru née Hirschmüller (7 November 1953 – 5 August 2008) was a German table tennis player.

She was five time German champion in her country's national table tennis championships. She participated in four world championships and five European championships in the 1970s. She started playing table tennis aged eleven. She married Hideyuki Kamizuru in 1999.
