= Josef Dvořáček =

Czech table tennis player

Personal information
- Nationality: Czech
- Citizenship: Czechoslovakia
- Born: 20 March 1952 (age 74)
Medal record
Representing Czechoslovakia
World Table Tennis Championships
Bronze medal – third place	1973	Mixed Doubles

Josef Dvořáček (born 20 March 1952) is a Czech former international table tennis player who represented Czechoslovakia.

== Life and career ==
Dvořáček was born on 20 March 1952. He was raised in Moravské Budějovice.

He won a bronze medal at the 1973 World Table Tennis Championships in the mixed doubles with Alica Grofová.

== See also ==
- List of table tennis players
- List of World Table Tennis Championships medalists
