= Roger Lagerfeldt =

Swedish table tennis player

Personal information
- Nationality: Sweden
Medal record
Representing Sweden
World Table Tennis Championships
Bronze medal – third place	1977	Men's Team

Roger Lagerfeldt is a male former international table tennis player from Sweden.

He won a bronze medal at the 1977 World Table Tennis Championships in the Swaythling Cup (men's team event) with Stellan Bengtsson, Kjell Johansson, Ake Gronlund and Ulf Thorsell for Sweden.

He also won a European Table Tennis Championships silver medal in 1976.

== See also ==
- List of table tennis players
- List of World Table Tennis Championships medalists
