= Wang Jun (table tennis) =

Chinese table tennis player

Wang Jun (Wang Chun)
Personal information
- Nationality: China
- Born: 1953 (age 72–73)
Medal record
Representing China
World Table Tennis Championships
Gold medal – first place	1977	Men's Team

Wang Jun (王俊, born 1953) also Wang Chun is a male former international table tennis player from China.

He won a gold medal at the 1977 World Table Tennis Championships in the Swaythling Cup (men's team event) with Kuo Yao-hua, Huang Liang, Li Chen-shih and Liang Ke-liang for China.

He was the fifth ranked player in China during 1977.

== See also ==
- List of table tennis players
- List of World Table Tennis Championships medalists
