= Wang Jun (physician) =

Chinese surgeon

- 王俊
- Born: November 1963 (age 62); Huaibin County, Henan, China
- Education: Zhengzhou University; Peking University Health Science Center
- Scientific career
- Fields: Chest surgery
- Workplaces: Peking University People's Hospital

Wang Jun (Chinese: 王俊; pinyin: Wáng Jùn; born November 1963) is a Chinese surgeon specializing in thoracic surgery and lung cancer. He is an academician of the Chinese Academy of Engineering who serves as director of the Chest Surgery Department of the Peking University People's Hospital. He has been hailed as "The First Thoracoscopic Surgeon in China".

== Biography ==
Wang was born in Huaibin County, Henan, in November 1963. He graduated from Zhengzhou University (1985) and Peking University Health Science Center (1989). In 1995, he won the International Anti-Cancer Alliance (UICC) Graham Fellowship and became a visiting scholar at the University of Washington, University of Chicago, University of Southern California and other famous universities. He joined the Jiusan Society that same year. In 2000 he was hired as a professor at Peking University. In 2001 he became a member of the All China Youth Federation.

== Honours and awards ==
- 2012 State Science and Technology Progress Award (Second Class)
- November 22, 2019 Member of the Chinese Academy of Engineering (CAE)
