= Shoko Takahashi =

Japanese table tennis player

Personal information
- Nationality: Japan
- Born: 1955 or 1956
Medal record
Representing Japan
World Table Tennis Championships
Gold medal – first place	1975	doubles
Bronze medal – third place	1975	team
Bronze medal – third place	1979	team

Shoko Takahashi (高橋 省子, Takahashi Shōko) is a former Japanese international table tennis player.

== Table tennis career ==
She won a gold medal at the 1975 World Table Tennis Championships in the doubles with Maria Alexandru.

In addition to the gold she also won a bronze medal in the team events of 1975 and 1979 for Japan.

== See also ==
- List of table tennis players
- List of World Table Tennis Championships medalists
