= Jean-Denis Constant =

French table tennis player

Personal information
- Nationality: France
- Born: 9 October 1955 (age 70) Étain, Meuse
Medal record
Representing France
World Table Tennis Championships
Bronze medal – third place	1973	Men's doubles
Bronze medal – third place	1975	Men's doubles

Jean-Denis Constant (born October 9, 1955), is a male former French international table tennis player.

He won two bronze medals in the men's doubles at the 1973 World Table Tennis Championships and 1975 World Table Tennis Championships with Jacques Secrétin.

== See also ==
- List of table tennis players
- List of World Table Tennis Championships medalists
