= Yujiro Imano =

Japanese table tennis player

Personal information
- Nationality: Japan
Medal record
Representing Japan
World Table Tennis Championships
Bronze medal – third place	1971	doubles
Bronze medal – third place	1973	team

Yujiro Imano is a former international table tennis player from Japan.

== Table tennis career ==
He won a bronze medal at the 1971 World Table Tennis Championships with Katsuyuki Abe and another bronze in the men's team event at the 1973 World Table Tennis Championships.

== See also ==
- List of table tennis players
- List of World Table Tennis Championships medalists
