= Wei Lijie (table tennis) =

Chinese table tennis player

Wie Lijie (Wei Li-Chieh)
Personal information
- Nationality: China
Medal record
World Table Tennis Championships
Silver medal – second place	1977	Women's Doubles

Wie Lijie (Chinese: 魏力捷) also known as Wei Li-Chieh is a former international table tennis player from China.

== Table tennis career ==
She won a silver medal at the 1977 World Table Tennis Championships in the women's doubles with Zhu Xiangyun.

== See also ==
- List of table tennis players
- List of World Table Tennis Championships medalists
