= Asta Gedraitite =

Soviet table tennis player

Asta Gedraitite (Stankene)
Personal information
- Nationality: Soviet Union
Medal record
Representing Soviet Union
World Table Tennis Championships
Silver medal – second place	1973	Women's team

Asta Gedraitite (married name Stankene) is a female former Soviet Union international table tennis player.

== Table tennis career ==
She won a silver medal at the 1973 World Table Tennis Championships in the mixed doubles with Anatoli Strokatov.

== See also ==
- List of table tennis players
- List of World Table Tennis Championships medalists
