= Zoran Kosanović =

Serbian Canadian table tennis player

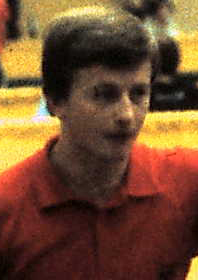

Personal information
- Nickname: Zoki
- Nationality: SFR Yugoslavia; Canada
- Born: 16 January 1956 Belgrade, PR Serbia, FPR Yugoslavia
- Died: 4 February 1998 (aged 42) Toronto, Ontario, Canada

Sport
- Sport: Table tennis
- Playing style: Left-handed all-round player
Medal record
Men's table tennis
Representing Yugoslavia
World Championships
Bronze medal – third place	1975 Calcutta	Team
European Championships
Gold medal – first place	1976 Prague	Team
Bronze medal – third place	1978 Duisburg	Doubles
Mediterranean Games
Gold medal – first place	1979 Split	Team
Bronze medal – third place	1979 Split	Doubles

Zoran Kosanović (Serbian Cyrillic: Зоран Косановић; 16 January 1956 – 4 February 1998) was a Serbian Canadian table tennis player.

== Career ==
=== Career in Yugoslavia ===
Kosanović represented Yugoslavia in all five world championships from 1973 to 1981 (in 1975, he won silver medal at the World Championship). In 1976, he was European Champion in Prague. With his doubles partner Milivoj Karakašević, he reached the European Championship semifinal in 1978.

In the Balkan Championships, he won 11 titles. From 1975 to 1979, he was the Yugoslav champion five times. His highest ranking in the ITTF World Ranking was 7th place.

=== Career in Canada ===
In September 1979, Kosanović moved to Toronto. In 1981, he won the North American Championship and in 1982 the US Open. At the 1983 World Championship in Tokyo, he represented Canada.

== Death and legacy ==
On February 4, 1998, Kosanović collapsed while taking part in a recreational soccer match at The Hangar sports complex and died of a heart attack. He is interred in Toronto's York Cemetery.

In March 1998, an annual soccer tournament held in Downsview Park was initiated by the Serbian White Eagles FC.

== Personal ==
Kosanović married Darinka "Doreen" (née Jovanov) in 1979 and had two children: a son Sasha and daughter Tanya.
