= Lee Ki-won =

South Korean table tennis player

Lee Ki Won
Personal information
- Nationality: South Korea
- Born: 1956 (age 69–70)
Medal record
Representing South Korea
World Table Tennis Championships
Silver medal – second place	1977	Women's team
Bronze medal – third place	1977	Women's doubles
Bronze medal – third place	1977	Mixed doubles

- Korean name
- Hangul: 이기원
- RR: I Giwon
- MR: I Kiwŏn

Lee Ki Won is a female South Korean former international table tennis player.

== Table tennis career ==
She won three medals at the 1977 World Table Tennis Championships.

She won a silver medal in the Corbillon Cup (women's team event), a bronze medal in the women's doubles with Kim Soon-ok and another bronze in the mixed doubles with Lee Sang-kuk.

== See also ==
- List of table tennis players
- List of World Table Tennis Championships medalists
