= Milivoj Karakašević =

Serbian table tennis player (1948–2022)

Personal information
- Full name: Milivoj Karakašević
- Nationality: Serbian
- Born: 30 July 1948 Belgrade, PR Serbia, FPR Yugoslavia
- Died: 26 March 2022 (aged 73) Belgrade, Serbia

Sport
- Sport: Table tennis
Medal record
Men's table tennis
Representing (Socialist Federal Republic of Yugoslavia) Yugoslavia
World Championships
Silver medal – second place	1975 Calcutta	Team
Bronze medal – third place	1971 Nagoya	Team
European Championships
Gold medal – first place	1976 Prague	Team
Silver medal – second place	1970 Moscow	Team
Silver medal – second place	1972 Rotterdam	Team
Bronze medal – third place	1974 Novi Sad	Team
Bronze medal – third place	1978 Duisburg	Doubles
Bronze medal – third place	1982 Budapest	Team
Mediterranean Championships
Gold medal – first place	1969 Athens	Team
Silver medal – second place	1969 Athens	Mixed
Bronze medal – third place	1969 Athens	Singles

Milivoj Karakašević (30 July 1948 – 26 March 2022) was a Serbian international table tennis player who competed for Yugoslavia in the 1970s and 1980s.

== Table tennis career ==
With the Yugoslav men's team, he won gold at the 1976 European Championships. In addition he won two silver medals and three bronze medals; in 1970 and 1972, he won silver in the team event and in 1974 and 1982, he won bronze, while he also won bronze in doubles in 1978 with Zoran Kosanović.

In the World Table Tennis Championships he won a bronze medal in 1971 and a silver medal in 1975 in the team event for Yugoslavia.

== Personal life ==
His son is the Serbian table tennis champion Aleksandar Karakašević.

== See also ==
- List of table tennis players
- List of World Table Tennis Championships medalists
