= Anatoli Strokatov =

Soviet table tennis player

Personal information
- Nationality: Soviet Union
- Born: March 10, 1955 Lviv
Medal record
Representing Soviet Union
World Table Tennis Championships
Silver medal – second place	1973	Mixed Doubles

Anatoli Viktorovich Strokatov (Russian: Анатолий Викторович Строкатов; born March 10, 1955), is a male former international table tennis player from the USSR.

He won a silver medal at the 1973 World Table Tennis Championships in the mixed doubles with Asta Gedraitite.

He also won three English Open titles.

== See also ==
- List of table tennis players
- List of World Table Tennis Championships medalists
