= Sarkis Sarchayan =

Soviet table tennis player

Personal information
- Full name: Sarkis Sarchayan
- Nationality: Soviet Union
- Born: 26 November 1947 Batumi, Georgian SSR, Soviet Union
- Died: 24 January 2021 (aged 73)
- Height: 174 cm (5 ft 9 in)

Sport
- Sport: Table tennis
- Playing style: Left-handed, shakehand grip
- Highest ranking: 5 (1973)
Medal record
Men's table tennis
Representing Soviet Union
Event	1st	2nd	3rd
World Championships	0	1	1
European Championships	0	3	5
Europe Top 16	0	0	1
Total	0	4	7
Representing Soviet Union
table tennis
World Table Tennis Championships
Silver medal – second place	1975 Calcutta	Mixed Doubles
Bronze medal – third place	1973 Sarajevo	Team
European Championships
Silver medal – second place	1970 Moscow	Team
Silver medal – second place	1968 Lyon	Team
Silver medal – second place	1966 London	Team
Bronze medal – third place	1978 Duisburg	Mixed Doubles
Bronze medal – third place	1978 Duisburg	Team
Bronze medal – third place	1976 Prague	Team
Bronze medal – third place	1974 Novi Sad	Doubles
Bronze medal – third place	1970 Moscow	Team
Europe Top 16
Bronze medal – third place	1976 Lübeck	Singles
European Youth Championships
Gold medal – first place	1965 Prague	Team
Silver medal – second place	1965 Prague	Singles

Sarkis Asatovich Sarchayan (Russian: Саркис Азатович Сархаян; 26 November 1947 - 21 January 2021), was a male former international table tennis player from Soviet Union. At his peak, he was ranked 7th in the World Rankings.

== Career ==
=== Junior career ===
In his childhood, Sarchayan played football and he began playing table tennis at the age of 11 in Batumi. In 1965, he was a part of the Soviet team that won the team event of the European Youth Championships in Prague. A year later in Kaunas, he won his first gold medal at the Soviet National Championships, winning the doubles event.

=== International career ===
In 1966, Sarchayan made his debut at the European Championships in London. He helped the Soviet team to win the silver medal in team event. Since this tournament, Sarchayan was a regular national team member until 1978.

Sarchayan did not lose a single game in the team event of the 1973 World Table Tennis Championships, helping the Soviet team to win bronze medals. The Soviets barely lost to the eventual champions, China team 4-5, but Sarchayan won all three of his games. In the next edition of the World Championships, Sarchayan won a silver medal in the mixed doubles event with Elmira Antonyan, losing their compatriots Stanislav Gomozkov and Zoja Rudnova in the final.

Sarchayan played his last major tournament in 1978 in Duisburg, where the European Championships were held. He finished the tournament with two bronze medals on his account, in mixed doubles and team events.

Sarchayan participated in four Europe Top 16 editions, his best being the 3rd place finish in 1976 tournament.

=== Accolades ===
On the professional circuit, he won one singles and eight doubles titles in his career. Sarchayan retired as the most successful player in the Soviet Championships history with a total of 26 gold medals. Five of them, in singles event.

== Death ==
In 2021, Sarchayan died from coronavirus at the age of 77.

== See also ==
- List of table tennis players
- List of World Table Tennis Championships medalists
