= Ingemar Wikström =

Swedish table tennis player

Personal information
- Nationality: Sweden
- Born: 7 November 1953 (age 72)
Medal record
Representing Sweden
World Table Tennis Championships
Gold medal – first place	1973	Men's Team
Bronze medal – third place	1975	Men's Team

Ingemar Wikström (born 7 November 1953) is a Swedish former international table tennis player.

== Table tennis career ==
He won a gold medal in the Swaythling Cup (men's team event) at the 1973 World Table Tennis Championships as part of the Sweden team that contained Anders Johansson, Kjell Johansson, Stellan Bengtsson and Bo Persson.

Two years later he won a bronze medal at the 1975 World Table Tennis Championships in the Swaythling Cup (men's team event).

He also won three medals in the European Table Tennis Championships.

== See also ==
- List of table tennis players
- List of World Table Tennis Championships medalists
