= Alica Grofová =

Czechoslovak table tennis player

Personal information
- Nationality: Czechoslovakia
- Born: 2 April 1952 (age 74) Vajnory
Medal record
Representing Czechoslovakia
World Table Tennis Championships
Silver medal – second place	1973	Women's singles
Bronze medal – third place	1973	Mixed doubles

Alica Grofová (married name Chladeková), is a female former Czechoslovak international table tennis player.

She won a silver medal in the women's singles and a bronze medal in the mixed doubles with Josef Dvořáček at the 1973 World Table Tennis Championships.

She also won an English Open title.

== See also ==
- List of table tennis players
- List of World Table Tennis Championships medalists
