= Lu Yuansheng =

Chinese table tennis player

Lu Yuansheng (Lu Yuan-sheng)
Personal information
- Nationality: China
- Born: 7 October 1954 (age 71)
Medal record
Representing China
World Table Tennis Championships
| Gold medal – first place | 1975 | Men's Team |
| Silver medal – second place | 1977 | Men's Doubles |

Lu Yuansheng also Lu Yuan-sheng, (born 7 October 1954) is a male Chinese former international table tennis player and current coach.

He won a gold medal at the 1975 World Table Tennis Championships in the men's team event and a silver medal in the men's doubles at the 1977 World Table Tennis Championships with Huang Liang.

He was the Chinese coach for both the men's team (1992) and women's team (1996), (2000) and (2004) in four consecutive Olympic Games.

== See also ==
- List of table tennis players
- List of World Table Tennis Championships medalists
