= Huang Liang (table tennis) =

Chinese table tennis player

Personal information
- Nationality: China
- Born: 20 March 1954
- Died: 23 December 1999 (aged 45)
Medal record
Representing China
World Table Tennis Championships
Bronze medal – third place	1977	Men's Singles
Silver medal – second place	1977	Men's Doubles
Gold medal – first place	1977	Men's Team
Silver medal – second place	1979	Men's Team
Bronze medal – third place	1981	Mixed Doubles

Huang Liang (simplified Chinese: 黄亮; traditional Chinese: 黃亮; pinyin: Huáng Liàng; 20 March 1954 – 23 December 1999) was a male Chinese international table tennis player.

== Career ==
He won three medals at the 1977 World Table Tennis Championships; a bronze medal in the men's singles a silver medal in the men's doubles with Lu Yuansheng and a gold medal in the Swaythling Cup (men's team event) for China.

Two years later he won a silver at the 1979 World Table Tennis Championships in the Swaythling Cup (men's team) and in 1981 won a bronze medal at the 1981 World Table Tennis Championships with Pu Qijuan in the mixed doubles.

He worked in Italy in the 1990s, and was diagnosed of esophagus cancer in 1997. When his health deteriorated, his family brought him back to Henan Cancer Hospital in Zhengzhou for treatment in December 1999.

== See also ==
- List of table tennis players
- List of World Table Tennis Championships medalists
