= Kim Soon-ok (table tennis) =

South Korean table tennis player

Personal information
- Nationality: South Korea
- Born: 1953 (age 72–73)
Medal record
Representing South Korea
World Table Tennis Championships
Gold medal – first place	1973	Women's team
Silver medal – second place	1975	Women's team
Bronze medal – third place	1977	Women's doubles
Silver medal – second place	1977	Women's team

Kim Soon-ok is a female South Korean former international table tennis player.

== Table tennis career ==
Kin Soon-ok won four medals at the World Table Tennis Championships.

She won a gold medal in the Corbillon Cup (women's team event) at the 1973 World Table Tennis Championships with Chung Hyun-sook, Lee Ailesa and Park Mi-ra for South Korea.

Two years later she won a silver medal in the team event. During the 1977 World Table Tennis Championships she won another silver team medal and a bronze medal in the women's doubles with Lee Ki Won.

== See also ==
- List of table tennis players
- List of World Table Tennis Championships medalists
