= Claude Bergeret =

French table tennis player

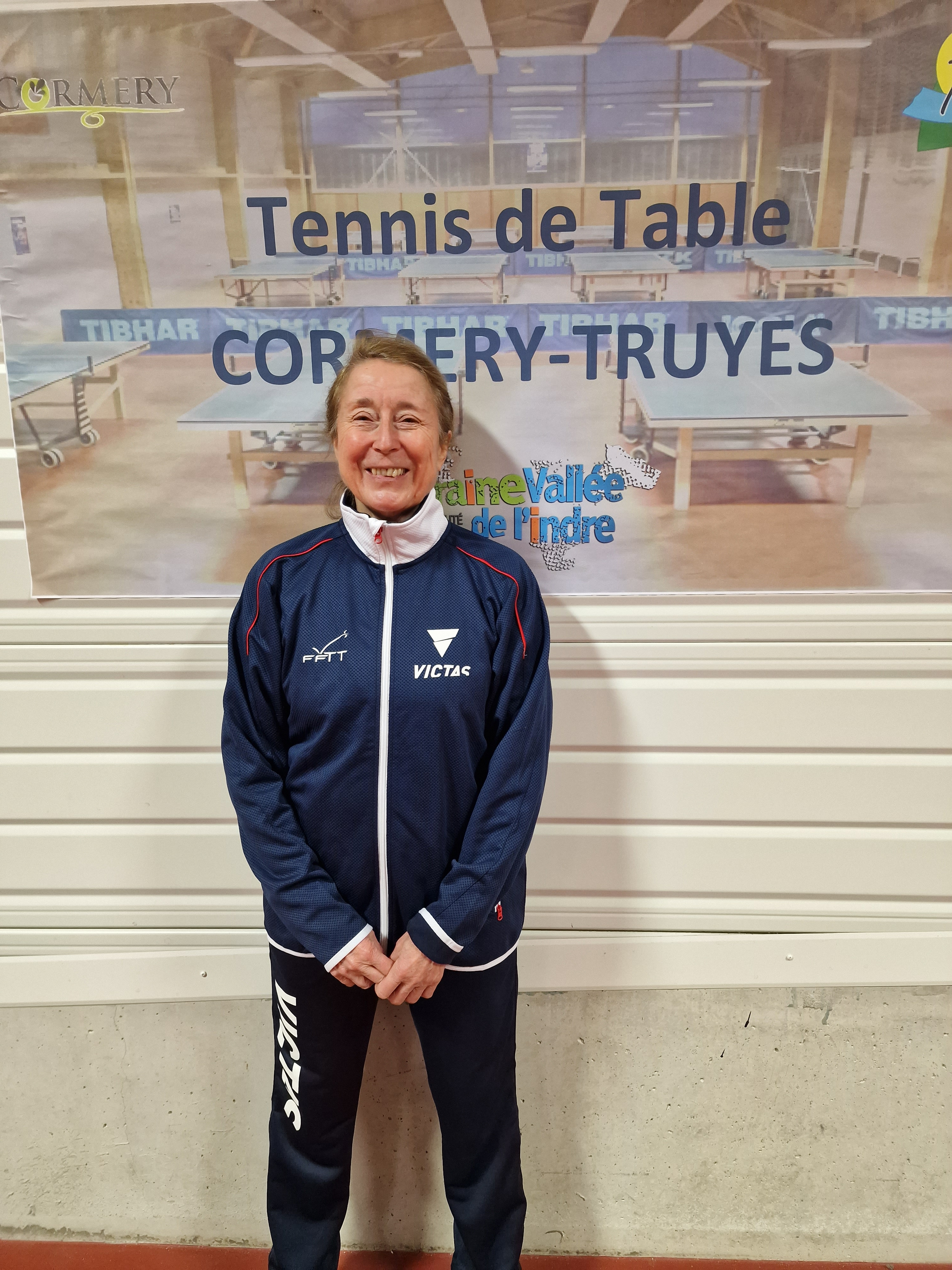

Personal information
- Nationality: France
- Born: 19 October 1954 (age 71)
Medal record
Table tennis
Representing France
World Championships
Gold medal – first place	1977 Birmingham	Mixed doubles
Bronze medal – third place	1979 Pyongyang	Mixed doubles

Claude Bergeret (born 19 October 1954) is a female former international table tennis player from France.

== Table tennis career ==
She started playing table tennis at the age of 10 in Annecy. Her style of play was based on the counterattack.

From 1974 to 1979 she won three medals in mixed and women's doubles in the Table Tennis European Championships and two medals at the World Table Tennis Championships.

She won a gold medal in the mixed doubles event with Jacques Secrétin at the 1977 World Table Tennis Championships in Birmingham.

She was six time national singles champion.

== Coaching ==
She retired in 1982 and became coach of the France junior team from 1983 to 1985, then the senior team in 1986-1987 and later appointed Vice President of the European Table Tennis Federation.

== See also ==
- List of table tennis players
- List of World Table Tennis Championships medalists
