= Elmira Antonyan =

Armenian table tennis player (born 1955)

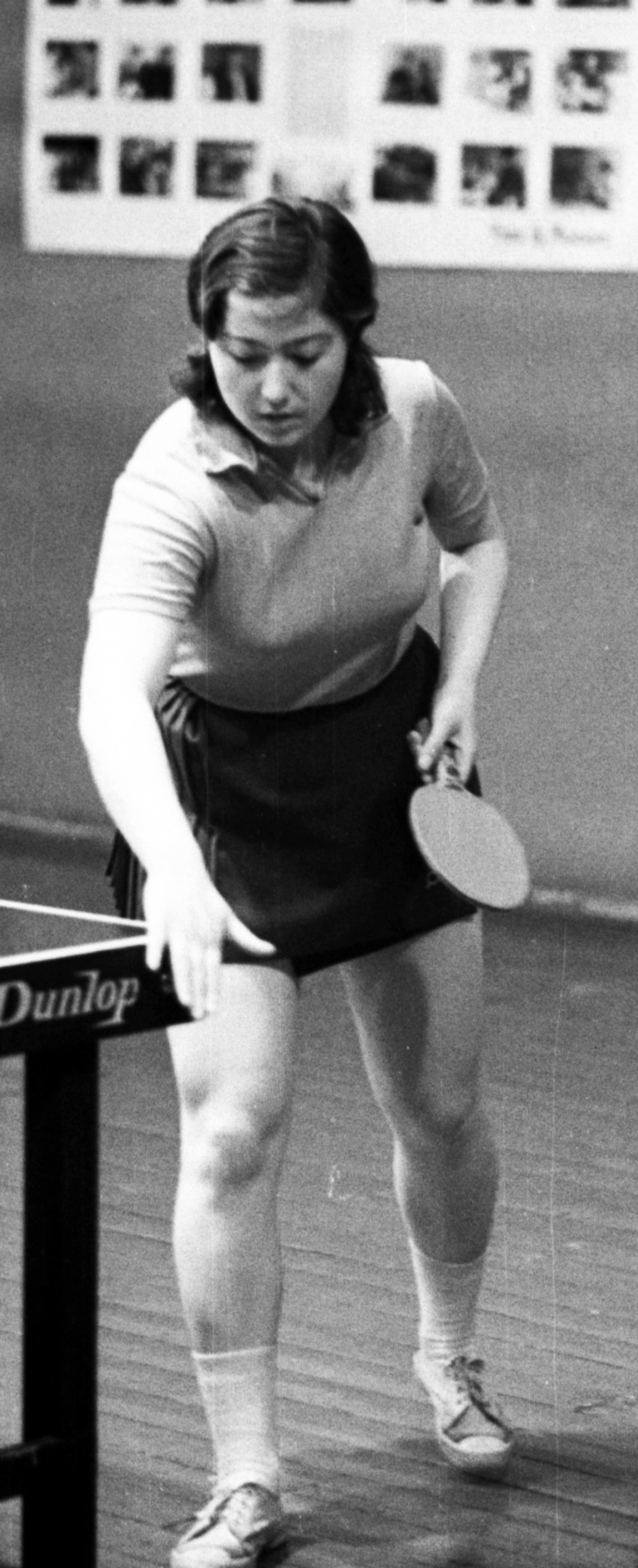

Personal information
- Nationality: Armenia
- Born: 28 June 1955 (age 71) Yerevan
Medal record
Representing Soviet Union
World Table Tennis Championships
Bronze medal – third place	1975	women's doubles
Silver medal – second place	1975	mixed doubles

Elmira Korjunovna Antonyan is an Armenian former international table tennis player who represented the Soviet Union. Her sister Narine Antonyan was also a table tennis player.

== Table tennis career ==
She won two World Championship medals at the 1975 World Table Tennis Championships; a bronze medal in the women's doubles with Tatiana Ferdman and a silver medal in the mixed doubles with Sarkis Sarchayan.

=== Coaching ===
She was a coach in Soviet Union, Armenia, Italy and Switzerland.

== See also ==
- List of table tennis players
- List of World Table Tennis Championships medalists
