= Zheng Huaiying =

Chinese table tennis player

Zheng Huaiying (Cheng Huai Ying)
Personal information
- Nationality: China
- Born: 1950 (age 75–76)

Sport
- Sport: Table tennis
Medal record
Women's table tennis
Representing China
World Championships
Gold medal – first place	1975 Calcutta	Team
Bronze medal – third place	1973 Sarajevo	Mixed
Silver medal – second place	1973 Sarajevo	Team
Asian Games
Gold medal – first place	1974 Tehran	Doubles
Gold medal – first place	1974 Tehran	Mixed
Gold medal – first place	1974 Tehran	Team
Asian Championships
Gold medal – first place	1974 Yokohama	Doubles
Silver medal – second place	1974 Yokohama	Team

Zheng Huaiying also known as Cheng Huai Ying is a female former international table tennis player from China.

== Table tennis career ==
From 1973 to 1975 she won three medals at the World Table Tennis Championships and several medals at the Asian Games and in the Asian Table Tennis Championships.

The three World Championship medals included a gold medals at the singles at the 1975 World Table Tennis Championships in the Corbillon Cup (team event) with Ge Xin'ai, Hu Yulan and Zhang Li for China.

In addition she won a silver medal in the team and bronze medal in the mixed doubles at the 1973 World Table Tennis Championships with Yu Changchun.

== See also ==
- List of table tennis players
- List of World Table Tennis Championships medalists
