= Tatiana Ferdman =

Soviet table tennis player

Personal information
- Full name: Tatiana Ferdman
- Nationality: Soviet Union
- Born: 14 July 1957 (age 69) Sverdlovsk

Sport
- Sport: Table tennis
Medal record
Women's table tennis
Representing Soviet Union
World Championships
Bronze medal – third place	1975 Calcutta	Single
Bronze medal – third place	1975 Calcutta	Doubles
Gold medal – first place	1975 Calcutta	Mixed

Tatiana Ferdman is a former international table tennis player from the Soviet Union.

== Table tennis career ==
She won three World Championship medals including a gold medal in the Mixed Doubles event with Stanislav Gomozkov at the World Table Tennis Championships in 1975.

She also won an English Open title.

== See also ==
- List of table tennis players
- List of World Table Tennis Championships medalists
