= Zhu Xiangyun =

Chinese table tennis player

Zhu Xiangyun (Chu Hsiang-Yun)
Personal information
- Nationality: China
- Born: 1950 (age 75–76)
Medal record
World Table Tennis Championships
Silver medal – second place	1975	Women's Doubles
Silver medal – second place	1977	Women's Doubles
Gold medal – first place	1977	Women's Team

Zhu Xiangyun (Chinese: 朱香云; born 1950) also known as Chu Hsiang-Yun is a former international table tennis player from China.

== Table tennis career ==
She won three medals in the World Table Tennis Championships.

During the 1975 World Table Tennis Championships she won a silver medal in the doubles with Lin Meiqun.

Two years later she won a second silver in the doubles with Wei Lijie and then won a gold medal for China in the Corbillon Cup (women's team event) with Ge Xin'ai, Zhang Deying and Zhang Li.

== See also ==
- List of table tennis players
- List of World Table Tennis Championships medalists
