= Hu Yulan =

Chinese table tennis player

Hu Yulan (Hu Yu-lan) 胡玉兰
Personal information
- Nationality: China
- Born: 1945
- Died: 18 October 2021 (aged 75–76)

Sport
- Sport: Table tennis
Medal record
Women's table tennis
Representing China
World Championships
Gold medal – first place	1975 Calcutta	Team
Gold medal – first place	1973 Sarajevo	Singles
Silver medal – second place	1973 Sarajevo	Team
Asian Championships
Silver medal – second place	1974 Yokohama	Team
Bronze medal – third place	1974 Yokohama	Doubles
Gold medal – first place	1972 Beijing	Team

Hu Yulan also known as Hu Yu-lan (Chinese: 胡玉兰; 1945 – 18 October 2021) was a female international table tennis player from China.

== Table tennis career ==
From 1972 to 1975 she won several medals in singles, doubles, and team events in the Asian Table Tennis Championships and in the World Table Tennis Championships.

The three World Championship medals included two gold medals in the singles at the 1973 World Table Tennis Championships and team event at the 1975 World Table Tennis Championships.

== See also ==
- List of table tennis players
- List of World Table Tennis Championships medalists
