= Lee Ailesa =

South Korean table tennis player

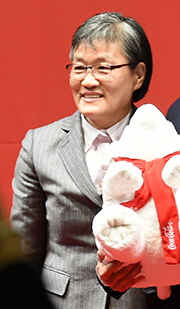

Personal information
- Nationality: South Korea
- Born: 15 August 1954 (age 71) Seoul

Sport
- Sport: Table tennis
Medal record
Women's table tennis
Representing South Korea
World Championships
Silver medal – second place	1977 Birmingham	Team
Silver medal – second place	1975 Calcutta	Team
Gold medal – first place	1973 Sarajevo	Team
Bronze medal – third place	1971 Nagoya	Team

Lee Ailesa (born 15 August 1954) is a former female international table tennis player from South Korea.

== Table tennis career ==
She won a gold medal in the Corbillon Cup (women's Team event) at the 1973 World Table Tennis Championships with Chung Hyun-sook, Kim Soon-ok and Park Mi-ra for South Korea.

In addition she won three more World Championship medals; a team bronze in 1971 and two team silver medals in 1975 and 1977, won also gold Swedish Open Championships (SOC) 1972 in Sweden respectively.

== See also ==
- List of table tennis players
- List of World Table Tennis Championships medalists
