= Chung Hyun-sook =

South Korean table tennis player

Chung Hyun-Sook
Personal information
- Full name: Chung Hyun-Sook
- Nationality: South Korea
- Born: 3 January 1952 (age 74)

Sport
- Sport: Table tennis
Medal record
Women's table tennis
Representing South Korea
World Championships
Silver medal – second place	1977 Birmingham	Team
Silver medal – second place	1975 Calcutta	Team
Gold medal – first place	1973 Sarajevo	Team

- Korean name
- Hangul: 정현숙
- Hanja: 鄭賢淑
- RR: Jeong Hyeonsuk
- MR: Chŏng Hyŏnsuk

Chung Hyun-Sook (Korean: 정현숙; born 3 January 1952) is a former table tennis player from South Korea. She won a gold medal in the Women's Team event at the World Table Tennis Championships in 1973. She became vice-president of the Republic of Korea Table Tennis Association in February 2013.
