= List of Asian Games medalists in table tennis =

This is the complete list of Asian Games medalists in table tennis from 1958 to 2026.

== Events ==
=== Men's singles ===
Games	Gold	Silver	Bronze
1958 Tokyo	Li Kou-tin (ROC)	Keisuke Tsunoda (JPN)	Seiji Narita (JPN)
1958 Tokyo	Li Kou-tin (ROC)	Keisuke Tsunoda (JPN)	Ichiro Ogimura (JPN)
1962 Jakarta	Keiichi Miki (JPN)	Ichiro Ogimura (JPN)	Koji Kimura (JPN)
1966 Bangkok	Kim Chung-yong (KOR)	Nobuhiko Hasegawa (JPN)	Houshang Bozorgzadeh (IRN)
1966 Bangkok	Kim Chung-yong (KOR)	Nobuhiko Hasegawa (JPN)	Koji Kimura (JPN)
1974 Tehran	Liang Geliang (CHN)	Mitsuru Kono (JPN)	Yun Chol (PRK)
1978 Bangkok	Liang Geliang (CHN)	Guo Yuehua (CHN)	Norio Takashima (JPN)
1978 Bangkok	Liang Geliang (CHN)	Guo Yuehua (CHN)	Jo Yong-ho (PRK)
1982 New Delhi	Xie Saike (CHN)	Kiyoshi Saito (JPN)	Seiji Ono (JPN)
1982 New Delhi	Xie Saike (CHN)	Kiyoshi Saito (JPN)	Jo Yong-ho (PRK)
1986 Seoul	Yoo Nam-kyu (KOR)	Hui Jun (CHN)	Yoshihito Miyazaki (JPN)
1986 Seoul	Yoo Nam-kyu (KOR)	Hui Jun (CHN)	Kim Wan (KOR)
1990 Beijing	Ma Wenge (CHN)	Wei Qingguang (CHN)	Chen Longcan (CHN)
1990 Beijing	Ma Wenge (CHN)	Wei Qingguang (CHN)	Yoo Nam-kyu (KOR)
1994 Hiroshima	Wang Tao (CHN)	Yoo Nam-kyu (KOR)	Ma Wenge (CHN)
1994 Hiroshima	Wang Tao (CHN)	Yoo Nam-kyu (KOR)	Kim Taek-soo (KOR)
1998 Bangkok	Kim Taek-soo (KOR)	Liu Guoliang (CHN)	Kong Linghui (CHN)
1998 Bangkok	Kim Taek-soo (KOR)	Liu Guoliang (CHN)	Oh Sang-eun (KOR)
2002 Busan	Wang Liqin (CHN)	Chuang Chih-yuan (TPE)	Kong Linghui (CHN)
2002 Busan	Wang Liqin (CHN)	Chuang Chih-yuan (TPE)	Oh Sang-eun (KOR)
2006 Doha	Wang Hao (CHN)	Ma Lin (CHN)	Li Ching (HKG)
2006 Doha	Wang Hao (CHN)	Ma Lin (CHN)	Ryu Seung-min (KOR)
2010 Guangzhou	Ma Long (CHN)	Wang Hao (CHN)	Jun Mizutani (JPN)
2010 Guangzhou	Ma Long (CHN)	Wang Hao (CHN)	Joo Sae-hyuk (KOR)
2014 Incheon	Xu Xin (CHN)	Fan Zhendong (CHN)	Joo Sae-hyuk (KOR)
2014 Incheon	Xu Xin (CHN)	Fan Zhendong (CHN)	Chuang Chih-yuan (TPE)
2018 Jakarta–Palembang	Fan Zhendong (CHN)	Lin Gaoyuan (CHN)	Noshad Alamian (IRI)
2018 Jakarta–Palembang	Fan Zhendong (CHN)	Lin Gaoyuan (CHN)	Lee Sang-su (KOR)
2022 Hangzhou	Wang Chuqin (CHN)	Fan Zhendong (CHN)	Wong Chun Ting (HKG)
2022 Hangzhou	Wang Chuqin (CHN)	Fan Zhendong (CHN)	Jang Woo-jin (KOR)
2026 Aichi-Nagoya	Lin Shidong (CHN)	Wang Chuqin (CHN)	Noshad Alamian (IRI)
2026 Aichi-Nagoya	Lin Shidong (CHN)	Wang Chuqin (CHN)	Lin Yun-ju (TPE)

=== Men's doubles ===
Games	Gold	Silver	Bronze
1958 Tokyo	Mai Văn Hòa and Trần Cảnh Được (VNM)	Li Kou-tin and Sou Ying-chen (ROC)	Chen Kao-shan and Hsieh Chin-ho (ROC)
1958 Tokyo	Mai Văn Hòa and Trần Cảnh Được (VNM)	Li Kou-tin and Sou Ying-chen (ROC)	Lê Văn Tiết and Trần Văn Liễu (VNM)
1962 Jakarta	Keiichi Miki and Ken Konaka (JPN)	Ichiro Ogimura and Koji Kimura (JPN)	Lê Văn Tiết and Lê Văn Inh (VNM)
1966 Bangkok	Hiroshi Takahashi and Keiichi Miki (JPN)	Koji Kimura and Nobuhiko Hasegawa (JPN)	Kim Chung-yong and Park Chung-kil (KOR)
1966 Bangkok	Hiroshi Takahashi and Keiichi Miki (JPN)	Koji Kimura and Nobuhiko Hasegawa (JPN)	Li Kou-tin and Yang Cheng-hsiung (ROC)
1974 Tehran	Nobuhiko Hasegawa and Mitsuru Kono (JPN)	Li Zhenshi and Liang Geliang (CHN)	Xi Enting and Xu Shaofa (CHN)
1978 Bangkok	Guo Yuehua and Huang Tongsheng (CHN)	Empie Wuisan and Sinyo Supit (INA)	Liang Geliang and Chen Xinhua (CHN)
1978 Bangkok	Guo Yuehua and Huang Tongsheng (CHN)	Empie Wuisan and Sinyo Supit (INA)	Yoon Kil-jung and Park Lee-hee (KOR)
1982 New Delhi	Seiji Ono and Hiroyuki Abe (JPN)	Kim Wan and Kim Ki-taik (KOR)	Guo Yuehua and Xie Saike (CHN)
1982 New Delhi	Seiji Ono and Hiroyuki Abe (JPN)	Kim Wan and Kim Ki-taik (KOR)	Hui Jun and Chen Xinhua (CHN)
1986 Seoul	Teng Yi and Hui Jun (CHN)	Kim Wan and Yoo Nam-kyu (KOR)	Kiyoshi Saito and Juzo Nukazuka (JPN)
1986 Seoul	Teng Yi and Hui Jun (CHN)	Kim Wan and Yoo Nam-kyu (KOR)	Ahn Jae-hyung and Park Chang-ik (KOR)
1990 Beijing	Ma Wenge and Chen Zhibin (CHN)	Chen Longcan and Wei Qingguang (CHN)	Yoo Nam-kyu and Kim Taek-soo (KOR)
1990 Beijing	Ma Wenge and Chen Zhibin (CHN)	Chen Longcan and Wei Qingguang (CHN)	Kim Song-hui and Kim Guk-chol (PRK)
1994 Hiroshima	Chu Kyo-sung and Lee Chul-seung (KOR)	Kim Taek-soo and Yoo Nam-kyu (KOR)	Lü Lin and Wang Tao (CHN)
1994 Hiroshima	Chu Kyo-sung and Lee Chul-seung (KOR)	Kim Taek-soo and Yoo Nam-kyu (KOR)	Ma Wenge and Zhang Lei (CHN)
1998 Bangkok	Kong Linghui and Liu Guoliang (CHN)	Lee Chul-seung and Oh Sang-eun (KOR)	Chiang Peng-lung and Chang Yen-shu (TPE)
1998 Bangkok	Kong Linghui and Liu Guoliang (CHN)	Lee Chul-seung and Oh Sang-eun (KOR)	Wu Wen-chia and Kuo Chih-hsiang (TPE)
2002 Busan	Lee Chul-seung and Ryu Seung-min (KOR)	Kim Taek-soo and Oh Sang-eun (KOR)	Ma Lin and Kong Linghui (CHN)
2002 Busan	Lee Chul-seung and Ryu Seung-min (KOR)	Kim Taek-soo and Oh Sang-eun (KOR)	Wang Liqin and Yan Sen (CHN)
2006 Doha	Ko Lai Chak and Li Ching (HKG)	Chen Qi and Ma Lin (CHN)	Ma Long and Wang Hao (CHN)
2006 Doha	Ko Lai Chak and Li Ching (HKG)	Chen Qi and Ma Lin (CHN)	Chiang Peng-lung and Chuang Chih-yuan (TPE)
2010 Guangzhou	Wang Hao and Zhang Jike (CHN)	Ma Lin and Xu Xin (CHN)	Kenta Matsudaira and Koki Niwa (JPN)
2010 Guangzhou	Wang Hao and Zhang Jike (CHN)	Ma Lin and Xu Xin (CHN)	Jeoung Young-sik and Kim Min-seok (KOR)
2014 Incheon	Ma Long and Zhang Jike (CHN)	Xu Xin and Fan Zhendong (CHN)	Koki Niwa and Kenta Matsudaira (JPN)
2014 Incheon	Ma Long and Zhang Jike (CHN)	Xu Xin and Fan Zhendong (CHN)	Gao Ning and Li Hu (SIN)
2022 Hangzhou	Fan Zhendong and Wang Chuqin (CHN)	Jang Woo-jin and Lim Jong-hoon (KOR)	Nima Alamian and Noshad Alamian (IRI)
2022 Hangzhou	Fan Zhendong and Wang Chuqin (CHN)	Jang Woo-jin and Lim Jong-hoon (KOR)	Chuang Chih-yuan and Lin Yun-ju (TPE)
2026 Aichi-Nagoya	Lin Shidong and Huang Youzheng (CHN)	Tomokazu Harimoto and Hiroto Shinozuka (JPN)	Sora Matsushima and Shunsuke Togami (JPN)
2026 Aichi-Nagoya	Lin Shidong and Huang Youzheng (CHN)	Tomokazu Harimoto and Hiroto Shinozuka (JPN)	Wen Ruibo and Xiang Peng (CHN)

=== Men's team ===
Games	Gold	Silver	Bronze
1958 Tokyo	South Vietnam (VNM); Lê Văn Tiết; Mai Văn Hòa; Trần Cảnh Được; Trần Văn Liễu	Japan (JPN); Seiji Narita; Ichiro Ogimura; Toshiaki Tanaka; Keisuke Tsunoda	Iran (IRN); Edmond Beitkhoda; Houshang Bozorgzadeh; Amir Ehteshamzadeh; Hamid Korloo
1962 Jakarta	Japan (JPN); Koji Kimura; Ken Konaka; Keiichi Miki; Ichiro Ogimura	South Korea (KOR); Chung Yung-moon; Kang Hi-jung; Kim Kyung-jun; Lee Dal-joon	Singapore (SIN); Goh Soo Nam; Lim Jit Choon; Lim Wai Sheng; Sim Poh Lin
1966 Bangkok	Japan (JPN); Nobuhiko Hasegawa; Koji Kimura; Keiichi Miki; Hiroshi Takahashi	Republic of China (ROC); Chen Jin-lieh; Li Kou-tin; Wong Shan-wu; Yang Cheng-hsiung	South Korea (KOR); Cho Chang-suk; Kim Chee-hwa; Kim Chung-yong; Park Chung-kil
1974 Tehran	China (CHN); Li Zhenshi; Liang Geliang; Xi Enting; Xu Shaofa; Zeng Boxiong	Japan (JPN); Nobuhiko Hasegawa; Mitsuru Kono; Kenji Koyama; Masayuki Kuze; Takashi Tamura	North Korea (PRK); Jo Yong-ho; Kong Jae-gyu; O Sung-sam; Yun Chol
1978 Bangkok	China (CHN); Chen Xinhua; Guo Yuehua; Huang Tongsheng; Liang Geliang	Japan (JPN); Hiroyuki Abe; Ichiro Hoshino; Masahiro Maehara; Norio Takashima	North Korea (PRK); Hong Chol; Jo Yong-ho; Ri Song-taek; Yun Chol
1982 New Delhi	China (CHN); Cai Zhenhua; Chen Xinhua; Guo Yuehua; Hui Jun; Xie Saike	Japan (JPN); Hiroyuki Abe; Juzo Nukazuka; Seiji Ono; Kiyoshi Saito; Kenichi Sakamoto	South Korea (KOR); Kim Ki-taik; Kim Wan; Park Lee-hee; Yoon Kil-jung
1986 Seoul	South Korea (KOR); Ahn Jae-hyung; Kim Wan; Park Chang-ik; Park Ji-hyun; Yoo Nam-kyu	China (CHN); Chen Longcan; Chen Xinhua; Hui Jun; Jiang Jialiang; Teng Yi	Japan (JPN); Yoshihito Miyazaki; Juzo Nukazuka; Kiyoshi Saito; Hiroshi Shibutani
1990 Beijing	South Korea (KOR); Kang Hee-chan; Kim Taek-soo; Moon Kyu-min; Park Ji-hyun; Yoo Nam-kyu	North Korea (PRK); Choi Gyong-sob; Kim Guk-chol; Kim Myong-jun; Kim Song-hui; Ri Gun-sang	China (CHN); Chen Longcan; Chen Zhibin; Wei Qingguang; Ma Wenge; Zhang Lei
1994 Hiroshima	China (CHN); Kong Linghui; Lü Lin; Ma Wenge; Wang Tao; Zhang Lei	South Korea (KOR); Chu Kyo-sung; Kim Taek-soo; Lee Chul-seung; Park Sang-joon; Yoo Nam-kyu	Japan (JPN); Sei Ito; Kiyonobu Iwasaki; Koji Matsushita; Yuji Matsushita; Koichi Takeya
1998 Bangkok	China (CHN); Kong Linghui; Liu Guoliang; Wang Liqin; Yan Sen; Zhang Yong	South Korea (KOR); Kim Taek-soo; Lee Chul-seung; Oh Sang-eun; Park Sang-joon	Japan (JPN); Seiko Iseki; Hiroshi Shibutani; Toshio Tasaki; Ryo Yuzawa
1998 Bangkok	China (CHN); Kong Linghui; Liu Guoliang; Wang Liqin; Yan Sen; Zhang Yong	South Korea (KOR); Kim Taek-soo; Lee Chul-seung; Oh Sang-eun; Park Sang-joon	Chinese Taipei (TPE); Chang Yen-shu; Chiang Peng-lung; Chuang Chih-yuan; Kuo Chih-hsiang; Wu Wen-chia
2002 Busan	China (CHN); Kong Linghui; Liu Guozheng; Ma Lin; Wang Liqin; Yan Sen	South Korea (KOR); Joo Sae-hyuk; Kim Taek-soo; Lee Chul-seung; Oh Sang-eun; Ryu Seung-min	Hong Kong (HKG); Cheung Yuk; Ko Lai Chak; Leung Chu Yan; Li Ching; Tang Kwok Kei
2002 Busan	China (CHN); Kong Linghui; Liu Guozheng; Ma Lin; Wang Liqin; Yan Sen	South Korea (KOR); Joo Sae-hyuk; Kim Taek-soo; Lee Chul-seung; Oh Sang-eun; Ryu Seung-min	Chinese Taipei (TPE); Chang Yen-shu; Chen Cheng-kao; Chiang Peng-lung; Chuang Chih-yuan; Wu Chih-chi
2006 Doha	China (CHN); Chen Qi; Hao Shuai; Ma Lin; Ma Long; Wang Hao	South Korea (KOR); Joo Sae-hyuk; Lee Jung-woo; Oh Sang-eun; Ryu Seung-min; Yoon Jae-young	Hong Kong (HKG); Cheung Yuk; Ko Lai Chak; Leung Chu Yan; Li Ching; Tse Ka Chun
2006 Doha	China (CHN); Chen Qi; Hao Shuai; Ma Lin; Ma Long; Wang Hao	South Korea (KOR); Joo Sae-hyuk; Lee Jung-woo; Oh Sang-eun; Ryu Seung-min; Yoon Jae-young	Chinese Taipei (TPE); Chang Yen-shu; Chiang Peng-lung; Chou Tung-yu; Chuang Chih-yuan; Wu Chih-chi
2010 Guangzhou	China (CHN); Ma Lin; Ma Long; Wang Hao; Xu Xin; Zhang Jike	South Korea (KOR); Jeoung Young-sik; Joo Sae-hyuk; Kim Min-seok; Lee Jung-woo; Oh Sang-eun	Japan (JPN); Seiya Kishikawa; Kenta Matsudaira; Jun Mizutani; Koki Niwa; Kaii Yoshida
2010 Guangzhou	China (CHN); Ma Lin; Ma Long; Wang Hao; Xu Xin; Zhang Jike	South Korea (KOR); Jeoung Young-sik; Joo Sae-hyuk; Kim Min-seok; Lee Jung-woo; Oh Sang-eun	North Korea (PRK); Jang Song-man; Kim Chol-jin; Kim Hyok-bong; Kim Nam-chol; Ri Chol-guk
2014 Incheon	China (CHN); Fan Zhendong; Ma Long; Xu Xin; Zhang Jike; Zhou Yu	South Korea (KOR); Jeong Sang-eun; Joo Sae-hyuk; Kim Dong-hyun; Kim Min-seok; Lee Jung-woo	Japan (JPN); Seiya Kishikawa; Kenta Matsudaira; Jun Mizutani; Yuto Muramatsu; Koki Niwa
2014 Incheon	China (CHN); Fan Zhendong; Ma Long; Xu Xin; Zhang Jike; Zhou Yu	South Korea (KOR); Jeong Sang-eun; Joo Sae-hyuk; Kim Dong-hyun; Kim Min-seok; Lee Jung-woo	Chinese Taipei (TPE); Chen Chien-an; Chiang Hung-chieh; Chuang Chih-yuan; Huang Sheng-sheng; Wu Chih-chi
2018 Jakarta–Palembang	China (CHN); Fan Zhendong; Liang Jingkun; Lin Gaoyuan; Wang Chuqin; Xue Fei	South Korea (KOR); Jang Woo-jin; Jeoung Young-sik; Kim Dong-hyun; Lee Sang-su; Lim Jong-hoon	India (IND); Anthony Amalraj; Harmeet Desai; Sathiyan Gnanasekaran; Sharath Kamal; Manav Thakkar
2018 Jakarta–Palembang	China (CHN); Fan Zhendong; Liang Jingkun; Lin Gaoyuan; Wang Chuqin; Xue Fei	South Korea (KOR); Jang Woo-jin; Jeoung Young-sik; Kim Dong-hyun; Lee Sang-su; Lim Jong-hoon	Chinese Taipei (TPE); Chen Chien-an; Chuang Chih-yuan; Lee Chia-sheng; Liao Cheng-ting; Lin Yun-ju
2022 Hangzhou	China (CHN); Fan Zhendong; Liang Jingkun; Lin Gaoyuan; Ma Long; Wang Chuqin	South Korea (KOR); An Jae-hyun; Jang Woo-jin; Lim Jong-hoon; Oh Jun-sung; Park Gang-hyeon	Iran (IRI); Nima Alamian; Noshad Alamian; Amir Hossein Hodaei
2022 Hangzhou	China (CHN); Fan Zhendong; Liang Jingkun; Lin Gaoyuan; Ma Long; Wang Chuqin	South Korea (KOR); An Jae-hyun; Jang Woo-jin; Lim Jong-hoon; Oh Jun-sung; Park Gang-hyeon	Chinese Taipei (TPE); Chuang Chih-yuan; Huang Yan-cheng; Liao Cheng-ting; Lin Yun-ju; Peng Wang-wei
2026 Aichi-Nagoya	Japan (JPN); Tomokazu Harimoto; Sora Matsushima; Hiroto Shinozuka; Shunsuke Togami; Yukiya Uda	China (CHN); Huang Youzheng; Lin Shidong; Wang Chuqin; Wen Ruibo; Xiang Peng	South Korea (KOR); An Jae-hyun; Jang Woo-jin; Lim Jong-hoon; Oh Jun-sung; Park Gyu-hyeon
2026 Aichi-Nagoya	Japan (JPN); Tomokazu Harimoto; Sora Matsushima; Hiroto Shinozuka; Shunsuke Togami; Yukiya Uda	China (CHN); Huang Youzheng; Lin Shidong; Wang Chuqin; Wen Ruibo; Xiang Peng	Chinese Taipei (TPE); Feng Yi-hsin; Hsu Hsien-chia; Hung Jing-kai; Kuo Guan-hong; Lin Yun-ju

=== Women's singles ===
Games	Gold	Silver	Bronze
1958 Tokyo	Taeko Namba (JPN)	Kazuko Yamaizumi (JPN)	Fujie Eguchi (JPN)
1958 Tokyo	Taeko Namba (JPN)	Kazuko Yamaizumi (JPN)	Cho Kyung-ja (KOR)
1962 Jakarta	Kimiyo Matsuzaki (JPN)	Kazuko Ito (JPN)	Masako Seki (JPN)
1966 Bangkok	Naoko Fukatsu (JPN)	Noriko Yamanaka (JPN)	Choi Jung-sook (KOR)
1966 Bangkok	Naoko Fukatsu (JPN)	Noriko Yamanaka (JPN)	Yoon Ki-sook (KOR)
1974 Tehran	Zhang Li (CHN)	Chung Hyun-sook (KOR)	Hu Yulan (CHN)
1978 Bangkok	Zhang Li (CHN)	Zhang Deying (CHN)	Kumiko Nagahara (JPN)
1978 Bangkok	Zhang Li (CHN)	Zhang Deying (CHN)	Kim Soon-ok (KOR)
1982 New Delhi	Cao Yanhua (CHN)	Tong Ling (CHN)	Yang Young-ja (KOR)
1982 New Delhi	Cao Yanhua (CHN)	Tong Ling (CHN)	Yoon Kyung-mi (KOR)
1986 Seoul	Jiao Zhimin (CHN)	He Zhili (CHN)	Mika Hoshino (JPN)
1986 Seoul	Jiao Zhimin (CHN)	He Zhili (CHN)	Yang Young-ja (KOR)
1990 Beijing	Deng Yaping (CHN)	Gao Jun (CHN)	Chen Zihe (CHN)
1990 Beijing	Deng Yaping (CHN)	Gao Jun (CHN)	Qiao Hong (CHN)
1994 Hiroshima	Chire Koyama (JPN)	Deng Yaping (CHN)	Qiao Hong (CHN)
1994 Hiroshima	Chire Koyama (JPN)	Deng Yaping (CHN)	Chai Po Wa (HKG)
1998 Bangkok	Wang Nan (CHN)	Li Ju (CHN)	Ryu Ji-hye (KOR)
1998 Bangkok	Wang Nan (CHN)	Li Ju (CHN)	Chen Jing (TPE)
2002 Busan	Zhang Yining (CHN)	Wang Nan (CHN)	Ryu Ji-hye (KOR)
2002 Busan	Zhang Yining (CHN)	Wang Nan (CHN)	Li Jiawei (SIN)
2006 Doha	Guo Yue (CHN)	Tie Ya Na (HKG)	Wang Nan (CHN)
2006 Doha	Guo Yue (CHN)	Tie Ya Na (HKG)	Li Jiawei (SIN)
2010 Guangzhou	Li Xiaoxia (CHN)	Guo Yue (CHN)	Ai Fukuhara (JPN)
2010 Guangzhou	Li Xiaoxia (CHN)	Guo Yue (CHN)	Kim Kyung-ah (KOR)
2014 Incheon	Liu Shiwen (CHN)	Zhu Yuling (CHN)	Yang Ha-eun (KOR)
2014 Incheon	Liu Shiwen (CHN)	Zhu Yuling (CHN)	Feng Tianwei (SIN)
2018 Jakarta–Palembang	Wang Manyu (CHN)	Chen Meng (CHN)	Jeon Ji-hee (KOR)
2018 Jakarta–Palembang	Wang Manyu (CHN)	Chen Meng (CHN)	Yu Mengyu (SGP)
2022 Hangzhou	Sun Yingsha (CHN)	Hina Hayata (JPN)	Wang Yidi (CHN)
2022 Hangzhou	Sun Yingsha (CHN)	Hina Hayata (JPN)	Shin Yu-bin (KOR)
2026 Aichi-Nagoya	Wang Manyu (CHN)	Sun Yingsha (CHN)	Miwa Harimoto (JPN)
2026 Aichi-Nagoya	Wang Manyu (CHN)	Sun Yingsha (CHN)	Hina Hayata (JPN)

=== Women's doubles ===
Games	Gold	Silver	Bronze
1958 Tokyo	Fujie Eguchi and Kazuko Yamaizumi (JPN)	Baguio Wong and Ng Yuk Chun (HKG)	Wie Sang-sook and Choi Kyung-ja (KOR)
1958 Tokyo	Fujie Eguchi and Kazuko Yamaizumi (JPN)	Baguio Wong and Ng Yuk Chun (HKG)	Chen Pao-pei and Chiang Tsai-yun (ROC)
1962 Jakarta	Masako Seki and Noriko Yamanaka (JPN)	Hwang Yool-ja and Lee Yung-mi (KOR)	Kimiyo Matsuzaki and Kazuko Ito (JPN)
1966 Bangkok	Noriko Yamanaka and Naoko Fukatsu (JPN)	Choi Jung-sook and Noh Hwa-ja (KOR)	Sachiko Morisawa and Tsunao Isomura (JPN)
1966 Bangkok	Noriko Yamanaka and Naoko Fukatsu (JPN)	Choi Jung-sook and Noh Hwa-ja (KOR)	Lin Hsin-chi and Lou Chiou-chu (ROC)
1974 Tehran	Zhang Li and Zheng Huaiying (CHN)	Tomie Edano and Yukie Ozeki (JPN)	Kim Chang-ae and Pak Yung-sun (PRK)
1978 Bangkok	Zhang Li and Zhang Deying (CHN)	Hui So Hung and Chang Siu Ying (HKG)	Cao Yanhua and Yang Ying (CHN)
1978 Bangkok	Zhang Li and Zhang Deying (CHN)	Hui So Hung and Chang Siu Ying (HKG)	Kumiko Nagahara and Keiko Komuro (JPN)
1982 New Delhi	Cao Yanhua and Dai Lili (CHN)	Pu Qijuan and Tong Ling (CHN)	Chang Yong-ok and Kim Gyong-sun (PRK)
1982 New Delhi	Cao Yanhua and Dai Lili (CHN)	Pu Qijuan and Tong Ling (CHN)	Ri Song-suk and Lim Jong-hwa (PRK)
1986 Seoul	Dai Lili and Geng Lijuan (CHN)	Jiao Zhimin and He Zhili (CHN)	Mika Hoshino and Miki Kitsukawa (JPN)
1986 Seoul	Dai Lili and Geng Lijuan (CHN)	Jiao Zhimin and He Zhili (CHN)	Yang Young-ja and Hyun Jung-hwa (KOR)
1990 Beijing	Hyun Jung-hwa and Hong Cha-ok (KOR)	Qiao Hong and Deng Yaping (CHN)	Chen Zihe and Gao Jun (CHN)
1990 Beijing	Hyun Jung-hwa and Hong Cha-ok (KOR)	Qiao Hong and Deng Yaping (CHN)	Ri Pun-hui and Yu Sun-bok (PRK)
1994 Hiroshima	Liu Wei and Qiao Yunping (CHN)	Deng Yaping and Qiao Hong (CHN)	Kim Boon-sik and Kim Moo-kyo (KOR)
1994 Hiroshima	Liu Wei and Qiao Yunping (CHN)	Deng Yaping and Qiao Hong (CHN)	Park Hae-jung and Ryu Ji-hye (KOR)
1998 Bangkok	Li Ju and Wang Nan (CHN)	Chan Tan Lui and Song Ah Sim (HKG)	Ryu Ji-hye and Lee Eun-sil (KOR)
1998 Bangkok	Li Ju and Wang Nan (CHN)	Chan Tan Lui and Song Ah Sim (HKG)	Xu Jing and Chen Chiu-tan (TPE)
2002 Busan	Lee Eun-sil and Seok Eun-mi (KOR)	Zhang Yining and Li Nan (CHN)	Wang Nan and Guo Yan (CHN)
2002 Busan	Lee Eun-sil and Seok Eun-mi (KOR)	Zhang Yining and Li Nan (CHN)	Ryu Ji-hye and Kim Moo-kyo (KOR)
2006 Doha	Guo Yue and Li Xiaoxia (CHN)	Tie Ya Na and Zhang Rui (HKG)	Chen Qing and Wang Nan (CHN)
2006 Doha	Guo Yue and Li Xiaoxia (CHN)	Tie Ya Na and Zhang Rui (HKG)	Huang Yi-hua and Lu Yun-feng (TPE)
2010 Guangzhou	Guo Yue and Li Xiaoxia (CHN)	Ding Ning and Liu Shiwen (CHN)	Hiroko Fujii and Misako Wakamiya (JPN)
2010 Guangzhou	Guo Yue and Li Xiaoxia (CHN)	Ding Ning and Liu Shiwen (CHN)	Ai Fukuhara and Kasumi Ishikawa (JPN)
2014 Incheon	Zhu Yuling and Chen Meng (CHN)	Liu Shiwen and Wu Yang (CHN)	Lee Ho Ching and Ng Wing Nam (HKG)
2014 Incheon	Zhu Yuling and Chen Meng (CHN)	Liu Shiwen and Wu Yang (CHN)	Kim Jong and Kim Hye-song (PRK)
2022 Hangzhou	Jeon Ji-hee and Shin Yu-bin (KOR)	Cha Su-yong and Pak Su-gyong (PRK)	Sutirtha Mukherjee and Ayhika Mukherjee (IND)
2022 Hangzhou	Jeon Ji-hee and Shin Yu-bin (KOR)	Cha Su-yong and Pak Su-gyong (PRK)	Miwa Harimoto and Miyuu Kihara (JPN)
2026 Aichi-Nagoya	Kuai Man and Wang Manyu (CHN)	Miwa Harimoto and Hina Hayata (JPN)	Doo Hoi Kem and Ng Wing Lam (HKG)
2026 Aichi-Nagoya	Kuai Man and Wang Manyu (CHN)	Miwa Harimoto and Hina Hayata (JPN)	Suthasini Sawettabut and Orawan Paranang (THA)

=== Women's team ===
Games	Gold	Silver	Bronze
1958 Tokyo	Japan (JPN); Fujie Eguchi; Taeko Namba; Tomi Okawa; Kazuko Yamaizumi	South Korea (KOR); Cho Kyung-ja; Choi Kyung-ja; Park Chung-ja; Wie Sang-sook	Republic of China (ROC); Chen Pao-pei; Chiang Tsai-yun; Ching Yui; Yao Tsu
1962 Jakarta	Japan (JPN); Kazuko Ito; Kimiyo Matsuzaki; Masako Seki; Noriko Yamanaka	Hong Kong (HKG); Chan Yee Ching; Choy Yee Shing; Fan Sin Kwan; Baguio Wong	South Korea (KOR); Choi Kyung-ja; Hwang Yool-ja; Lee Shin-ja; Lee Yung-mi
1966 Bangkok	Japan (JPN); Naoko Fukatsu; Tsunao Isomura; Sachiko Morisawa; Noriko Yamanaka	South Korea (KOR); Choi Jung-sook; Jong Hae-ok; Noh Hwa-ja; Yoon Ki-sook	Republic of China (ROC); Lin Hsin-chi; Lou Chiou-chu; Tsan Yin-hsieh
1974 Tehran	China (CHN); Hu Yulan; Huang Xiping; Zhang Li; Zheng Huaiying	South Korea (KOR); Chung Hyun-sook; Kim Jin-hi; Kim Soon-ok; Lee Ailesa	Japan (JPN); Tomie Edano; Yukie Ozeki; Fumiko Shinpo; Shoko Takahashi
1978 Bangkok	China (CHN); Cao Yanhua; Yang Ying; Zhang Deying; Zhang Li	South Korea (KOR); Kim Soon-ok; Lee Ki-won; Lee Soo-ja; Park Hong-ja	Japan (JPN); Ryoko Chiba; Keiko Komuro; Kumiko Nagahara; Fumiko Shinpo
1982 New Delhi	China (CHN); Cao Yanhua; Dai Lili; Pu Qijuan; Tong Ling	South Korea (KOR); An Hae-sook; Lee Soo-ja; Yang Young-ja; Yoon Kyung-mi	North Korea (PRK); Chang Yong-ok; Kim Gyong-sun; Lim Jong-hwa; Ri Song-suk
1986 Seoul	South Korea (KOR); Hyun Jung-hwa; Kim Young-mi; Lee Sun; Yang Young-ja	China (CHN); Dai Lili; Geng Lijuan; He Zhili; Jiao Zhimin	Japan (JPN); Mika Hoshino; Kiyomi Ishida; Miki Kitsukawa; Kyoko Uchiyama
1990 Beijing	China (CHN); Gao Jun; Chen Zihe; Deng Yaping; Qiao Hong	South Korea (KOR); Hong Cha-ok; Hong Soon-hwa; Hyun Jung-hwa; Lee Tae-joo	Hong Kong (HKG); Chai Po Wa; Chan Suk Yuen; Chan Tan Lui; Cheng To
1994 Hiroshima	China (CHN); Deng Yaping; Liu Wei; Qiao Hong; Qiao Yunping	Hong Kong (HKG); Chai Po Wa; Chan Suk Yuen; Chan Tan Lui; Cheng To	Japan (JPN); Mitsue Endo; Chire Koyama; Keiko Okazaki; Rika Sato
1998 Bangkok	China (CHN); Li Ju; Wang Nan; Wu Na; Yang Ying; Zhang Yining	North Korea (PRK); Kim Hyang-mi; Kim Hyon-hui; Tu Jong-sil; Wi Bok-sun	Hong Kong (HKG); Chan Tan Lui; Song Ah Sim; Tong Wun; Wong Ching
1998 Bangkok	China (CHN); Li Ju; Wang Nan; Wu Na; Yang Ying; Zhang Yining	North Korea (PRK); Kim Hyang-mi; Kim Hyon-hui; Tu Jong-sil; Wi Bok-sun	South Korea (KOR); Kim Moo-kyo; Lee Eun-sil; Lee Kyoung-sun; Park Hae-jung; Ryu Ji-hye
2002 Busan	North Korea (PRK); Kim Hyang-mi; Kim Hyon-hui; Kim Mi-yong; Kim Yun-mi; Ryom Won-ok	China (CHN); Guo Yan; Li Nan; Niu Jianfeng; Wang Nan; Zhang Yining	Japan (JPN); Ai Fukuhara; Satoko Kishida; An Konishi; Mikie Takahashi; Aya Umemura
2002 Busan	North Korea (PRK); Kim Hyang-mi; Kim Hyon-hui; Kim Mi-yong; Kim Yun-mi; Ryom Won-ok	China (CHN); Guo Yan; Li Nan; Niu Jianfeng; Wang Nan; Zhang Yining	Singapore (SIN); Jing Junhong; Li Jiawei; Tan Paey Fern; Zhang Xueling
2006 Doha	China (CHN); Chen Qing; Guo Yan; Guo Yue; Li Xiaoxia; Wang Nan	Singapore (SIN); Li Jiawei; Sun Beibei; Tan Paey Fern; Tan Yan Zhen; Zhang Xueling	South Korea (KOR); Kim Kyung-ah; Kwak Bang-bang; Lee Eun-hee; Moon Hyun-jung; Park Mi-young
2006 Doha	China (CHN); Chen Qing; Guo Yan; Guo Yue; Li Xiaoxia; Wang Nan	Singapore (SIN); Li Jiawei; Sun Beibei; Tan Paey Fern; Tan Yan Zhen; Zhang Xueling	North Korea (PRK); Kim Jong; Kim Mi-yong; Ko Un-gyong; Ryom Won-ok
2010 Guangzhou	China (CHN); Ding Ning; Guo Yan; Guo Yue; Li Xiaoxia; Liu Shiwen	Singapore (SIN); Feng Tianwei; Li Jiawei; Sun Beibei; Wang Yuegu; Yu Mengyu	South Korea (KOR); Kim Kyung-ah; Moon Hyun-jung; Park Mi-young; Seok Ha-jung; Yang Ha-eun
2010 Guangzhou	China (CHN); Ding Ning; Guo Yan; Guo Yue; Li Xiaoxia; Liu Shiwen	Singapore (SIN); Feng Tianwei; Li Jiawei; Sun Beibei; Wang Yuegu; Yu Mengyu	North Korea (PRK); Han Hye-song; Hyon Ryon-hui; Kim Hye-song; Kim Jong; Sin Hye-song
2014 Incheon	China (CHN); Chen Meng; Ding Ning; Liu Shiwen; Wu Yang; Zhu Yuling	Japan (JPN); Ai Fukuhara; Miu Hirano; Sayaka Hirano; Kasumi Ishikawa; Misako Wakamiya	North Korea (PRK); Kim Hye-song; Kim Jong; Kim Song-i; Ri Mi-gyong; Ri Myong-sun
2014 Incheon	China (CHN); Chen Meng; Ding Ning; Liu Shiwen; Wu Yang; Zhu Yuling	Japan (JPN); Ai Fukuhara; Miu Hirano; Sayaka Hirano; Kasumi Ishikawa; Misako Wakamiya	Singapore (SIN); Feng Tianwei; Isabelle Li; Lin Ye; Yu Mengyu; Zhou Yihan
2018 Jakarta–Palembang	China (CHN); Chen Meng; Chen Xingtong; Sun Yingsha; Wang Manyu; Zhu Yuling	North Korea (PRK); Cha Hyo-sim; Choe Hyon-hwa; Kim Nam-hae; Kim Song-i; Pyon Song-gyong	Hong Kong (HKG); Doo Hoi Kem; Lee Ho Ching; Li Ching Wan; Ng Wing Nam; Minnie Soo
2018 Jakarta–Palembang	China (CHN); Chen Meng; Chen Xingtong; Sun Yingsha; Wang Manyu; Zhu Yuling	North Korea (PRK); Cha Hyo-sim; Choe Hyon-hwa; Kim Nam-hae; Kim Song-i; Pyon Song-gyong	South Korea (KOR); Choi Hyo-joo; Jeon Ji-hee; Kim Ji-ho; Suh Hyo-won; Yang Ha-eun
2022 Hangzhou	China (CHN); Chen Meng; Chen Xingtong; Sun Yingsha; Wang Manyu; Wang Yidi	Japan (JPN); Miwa Harimoto; Hina Hayata; Miu Hirano; Miyuu Kihara; Miyu Nagasaki	South Korea (KOR); Jeon Ji-hee; Lee Eun-hye; Shin Yu-bin; Suh Hyo-won; Yang Ha-eun
2022 Hangzhou	China (CHN); Chen Meng; Chen Xingtong; Sun Yingsha; Wang Manyu; Wang Yidi	Japan (JPN); Miwa Harimoto; Hina Hayata; Miu Hirano; Miyuu Kihara; Miyu Nagasaki	Thailand (THA); Wanwisa Aueawiriyayothin; Tamolwan Khetkhuan; Orawan Paranang; Jinnipa Sawettabut; Suthasini Sawettabut
2026 Aichi-Nagoya	China (CHN); Chen Yi; Fan Shuhan; Kuai Man; Sun Yingsha; Wang Manyu	Japan (JPN); Miwa Harimoto; Hina Hayata; Mima Ito; Rin Mende; Miyu Nagasaki	South Korea (KOR); Joo Cheon-hui; Kim Na-yeong; Lee Eun-hye; Park Ga-hyeon; Shin Yu-bin
2026 Aichi-Nagoya	China (CHN); Chen Yi; Fan Shuhan; Kuai Man; Sun Yingsha; Wang Manyu	Japan (JPN); Miwa Harimoto; Hina Hayata; Mima Ito; Rin Mende; Miyu Nagasaki	North Korea (PRK); Cha Su Yong; Choe Jong Im; Kim Kum Yong; Pyon Song Gyong

=== Mixed doubles ===
Games	Gold	Silver	Bronze
1958 Tokyo	Ichiro Ogimura and Fujie Eguchi (JPN)	Toshiaki Tanaka and Kazuko Yamaizumi (JPN)	Seiji Narita and Tomi Okawa (JPN)
1958 Tokyo	Ichiro Ogimura and Fujie Eguchi (JPN)	Toshiaki Tanaka and Kazuko Yamaizumi (JPN)	Keisuke Tsunoda and Taeko Namba (JPN)
1962 Jakarta	Ichiro Ogimura and Kimiyo Matsuzaki (JPN)	Koji Kimura and Kazuko Ito (JPN)	Keiichi Miki and Masako Seki (JPN)
1966 Bangkok	Koji Kimura and Naoko Fukatsu (JPN)	Kim Chung-yong and Yoon Ki-sook (KOR)	Keiichi Miki and Noriko Yamanaka (JPN)
1966 Bangkok	Koji Kimura and Naoko Fukatsu (JPN)	Kim Chung-yong and Yoon Ki-sook (KOR)	Park Chung-kil and Choi Jung-sook (KOR)
1974 Tehran	Liang Geliang and Zheng Huaiying (CHN)	Kang Moon-soo and Kim Soon-ok (KOR)	Mitsuru Kono and Tomie Edano (JPN)
1978 Bangkok	Guo Yuehua and Zhang Li (CHN)	Liang Geliang and Zhang Deying (CHN)	Lee Sang-kuk and Lee Ki-won (KOR)
1978 Bangkok	Guo Yuehua and Zhang Li (CHN)	Liang Geliang and Zhang Deying (CHN)	Yoon Kil-jung and Kim Soon-ok (KOR)
1982 New Delhi	Xie Saike and Cao Yanhua (CHN)	Chen Xinhua and Tong Ling (CHN)	Hiroyuki Abe and Keiko Yamashita (JPN)
1982 New Delhi	Xie Saike and Cao Yanhua (CHN)	Chen Xinhua and Tong Ling (CHN)	Yoon Kil-jung and Yoon Kyung-mi (KOR)
1986 Seoul	Teng Yi and Dai Lili (CHN)	Hui Jun and Geng Lijuan (CHN)	Kim Wan and Hyun Jung-hwa (KOR)
1986 Seoul	Teng Yi and Dai Lili (CHN)	Hui Jun and Geng Lijuan (CHN)	Yoo Nam-kyu and Yang Young-ja (KOR)
1990 Beijing	Wei Qingguang and Deng Yaping (CHN)	Yoo Nam-kyu and Hyun Jung-hwa (KOR)	Chen Zhibin and Chen Zihe (CHN)
1990 Beijing	Wei Qingguang and Deng Yaping (CHN)	Yoo Nam-kyu and Hyun Jung-hwa (KOR)	Kang Hee-chan and Hong Cha-ok (KOR)
1994 Hiroshima	Kong Linghui and Deng Yaping (CHN)	Chiang Peng-lung and Xu Jing (TPE)	Yoo Nam-kyu and Park Hae-jung (KOR)
1994 Hiroshima	Kong Linghui and Deng Yaping (CHN)	Chiang Peng-lung and Xu Jing (TPE)	Wu Wen-chia and Chen Jing (TPE)
1998 Bangkok	Wang Liqin and Wang Nan (CHN)	Oh Sang-eun and Kim Moo-kyo (KOR)	Ryo Yuzawa and Keiko Okazaki (JPN)
1998 Bangkok	Wang Liqin and Wang Nan (CHN)	Oh Sang-eun and Kim Moo-kyo (KOR)	Kim Song-hui and Kim Hyon-hui (PRK)
2002 Busan	Cheung Yuk and Tie Ya Na (HKG)	Ryu Seung-min and Ryu Ji-hye (KOR)	Ma Lin and Li Nan (CHN)
2002 Busan	Cheung Yuk and Tie Ya Na (HKG)	Ryu Seung-min and Ryu Ji-hye (KOR)	Wang Liqin and Wang Nan (CHN)
2006 Doha	Ma Lin and Wang Nan (CHN)	Lee Jung-woo and Lee Eun-hee (KOR)	Joo Sae-hyuk and Kim Kyung-ah (KOR)
2006 Doha	Ma Lin and Wang Nan (CHN)	Lee Jung-woo and Lee Eun-hee (KOR)	Yang Zi and Li Jiawei (SIN)
2010 Guangzhou	Xu Xin and Guo Yan (CHN)	Cheung Yuk and Jiang Huajun (HKG)	Seiya Kishikawa and Ai Fukuhara (JPN)
2010 Guangzhou	Xu Xin and Guo Yan (CHN)	Cheung Yuk and Jiang Huajun (HKG)	Kenta Matsudaira and Kasumi Ishikawa (JPN)
2014 Incheon	Kim Hyok-bong and Kim Jong (PRK)	Jiang Tianyi and Lee Ho Ching (HKG)	Seiya Kishikawa and Ai Fukuhara (JPN)
2014 Incheon	Kim Hyok-bong and Kim Jong (PRK)	Jiang Tianyi and Lee Ho Ching (HKG)	Kim Min-seok and Jeon Ji-hee (KOR)
2018 Jakarta–Palembang	Wang Chuqin and Sun Yingsha (CHN)	Lin Gaoyuan and Wang Manyu (CHN)	Ho Kwan Kit and Lee Ho Ching (HKG)
2018 Jakarta–Palembang	Wang Chuqin and Sun Yingsha (CHN)	Lin Gaoyuan and Wang Manyu (CHN)	Sharath Kamal and Manika Batra (IND)
2022 Hangzhou	Wang Chuqin and Sun Yingsha (CHN)	Lin Gaoyuan and Wang Yidi (CHN)	Jang Woo-jin and Jeon Ji-hee (KOR)
2022 Hangzhou	Wang Chuqin and Sun Yingsha (CHN)	Lin Gaoyuan and Wang Yidi (CHN)	Lim Jong-hoon and Shin Yu-bin (KOR)
2026 Aichi-Nagoya	Lin Shidong and Kuai Man (CHN)	Wang Chuqin and Sun Yingsha (CHN)	Lim Jong-hoon and Shin Yu-bin (KOR)
2026 Aichi-Nagoya	Lin Shidong and Kuai Man (CHN)	Wang Chuqin and Sun Yingsha (CHN)	Manush Shah and Diya Chitale (IND)
