= ITTF–ATTU Asian Cup =

Annual table tennis event

- Most recent season or competition: 2026 ITTF-ATTU Asian Cup
- Sport: Table tennis
- Founded: 1983
- Singles entrants: 32 men; 32 women
- Confederation: Asian Table Tennis Union
- Most recent champions: Men: (China) Wang Chuqin; Women: (China) Sun Yingsha
- Most titles: Men: (China) Ma Long (4) (China) Xu Xin (4); Women: (China) Liu Shiwen (4)

The ITTF–ATTU Asian Cup is an annual table tennis competition held by the International Table Tennis Federation (ITTF) and the Asian Table Tennis Union (ATTU). The first edition was held in 1983. The competition features men's and women's singles events, with 32 players qualifying to take part in each event, subject to a maximum of four players per association.

Since 2013, the Asian Cup serves as a qualification event for the World Cup.

== Results ==
=== Men's singles ===
Year	Host city	Gold	Silver	Bronze
1983	Wuxi	(China) Cai Zhenhua	(China) Jiang Jialiang	(China) Xie Saike
1984	New Delhi	(China) Hui Jun	(China) Cai Zhenhua	(China) Xie Saike
1985	Singapore	(China) Chen Longcan	(China) Jiang Jialiang	(China) Teng Yi
1986	Karachi	(China) Wei Qingguang	(China) Fan Changmao	(North Korea) Kim Song-hui
1987	Seoul	(China) Teng Yi	(China) Chen Longcan	(South Korea) Kim Ki-taik
1988	Manila	(China) Wei Qingguang	(China) Chen Longcan	(South Korea) Kim Taek-soo
1989	Beijing	(Japan) Kiyoshi Saito	(China) Ma Wenge	(China) Chen Longcan
1991 (May)	Dhaka	(China) Wang Yonggang	(South Korea) Lee Chul-seung	(North Korea) Kim Guk-chol
1991 (November)	Manila	(North Korea) Kim Guk-chol	(North Korea) Kim Song-hui	(South Korea) Lee Chul-seung
1992	Hong Kong	(China) Ma Wenge	(South Korea) Lee Sang-joon	(Hong Kong) Lo Chuen Tsung
1993	Shunde	(North Korea) Li Gun-sang	(China) Wang Tao	(China) Liu Guoliang
1994	Shanghai	(China) Lin Zhigang	(China) Xiong Ke	(South Korea) Yoo Nam-kyu
1996	New Delhi	(China) Ma Lin	(China) Wang Liqin	(Japan) Shinnosuke Kiho
1997	Pune	(China) Guo Keli	(India) Chetan Baboor	(China) Lin Zhigang
2000	Mumbai	(China) Chen Tianyuan	(China) Hao Shuai	(India) Chetan Baboor
2000	Mumbai	(China) Chen Tianyuan	(China) Hao Shuai	(Hong Kong) Leung Chu Yan
2003	Tehran	(China) Ye Ruoting	(South Korea) Jong Kwan-hoyk	(China) Zhang Yang
2004	Mahshahr	(Hong Kong) Cheung Yuk	(China) Xu Hui	(China) Hou Yingchao
2005	New Delhi	(China) Wang Hao	(China) Hao Shuai	(Hong Kong) Li Ching
2005	New Delhi	(China) Wang Hao	(China) Hao Shuai	(Singapore) Yang Zi
2006	Kobe	(China) Wang Hao	(China) Chen Qi	(Chinese Taipei) Chiang Peng-lung
2007	Hanoi	(Singapore) Gao Ning	(South Korea) Kim Jung-hoon	(Japan) Jun Mizutani
2008	Sapporo	(China) Ma Long	(China) Chen Qi	(Singapore) Gao Ning
2009	Hangzhou	(China) Ma Long	(China) Wang Hao	(China) Zhang Jike
2010	Guangzhou	(China) Zhang Jike	(Singapore) Gao Ning	(China) Xu Xin
2011	Changsha^{[b]}	(China) Ma Long	(China) Xu Xin	(Japan) Kaii Yoshida
2012	Guangzhou	(China) Xu Xin	(Japan) Maharu Yoshimura	(Hong Kong) Jiang Tianyi
2013	Hong Kong	(China) Xu Xin	(China) Yan An	(Chinese Taipei) Chuang Chih-yuan
2014	Wuhan	(China) Ma Long	(China) Fan Zhendong	(Japan) Jun Mizutani
2015	Jaipur	(China) Xu Xin	(China) Fan Zhendong	(Japan) Jun Mizutani
2016	Dubai	(China) Xu Xin	(China) Zhang Jike	(Hong Kong) Wong Chun-ting
2017	Ahmedabad	(China) Lin Gaoyuan	(China) Fan Zhendong	(South Korea) Lee Sang-su
2018	Yokohama	(China) Fan Zhendong	(China) Lin Gaoyuan	(South Korea) Lee Sang-su
2019	Yokohama	(China) Fan Zhendong	(China) Ma Long	(Japan) Koki Niwa
2020	Tournament cancelled due to the COVID-19 pandemic.			
2022	Bangkok	(Japan) Tomokazu Harimoto	(South Korea) Lim Jong-hoon	(Chinese Taipei) Chuang Chih-yuan
2025	Shenzhen	(China) Wang Chuqin	(China) Liang Jingkun	(China) Lin Shidong
2026	Haikou	(China) Wang Chuqin	(Japan) Tomokazu Harimoto	(Japan) Shunsuke Togami

=== Women's singles ===
Year	Host city	Gold	Silver	Bronze
1983	Wuxi	(China) Cao Yanhua	(China) Tong Ling	(China) Jiao Zhimin
1984	New Delhi	(China) Tong Ling	(China) Ni Xialian	(South Korea) Lee Mi-woo
1985	Singapore	(China) Jiao Zhimin	(China) Ni Xialian	(North Korea) Cho Jong-hui
1986	Karachi	(China) Hu Xiaoxin	(China) Zhu Juan	(North Korea) Cho Jong-hui
1987	Seoul	(China) Jiao Zhimin	(China) Li Huifen	(South Korea) Hyun Jung-hwa
1988	Manila	(China) Deng Yaping	(China) Li Huifen	(Hong Kong) Chai Po Wa
1989	Beijing	(North Korea) Yu Sun-bok	(China) Qiao Hong	(Hong Kong) Chai Po Wa
1991 (May)	Dhaka	(North Korea) Lee Jong-suk	(China) Fan Jianxin	(China) Zhang Qin
1991 (November)	Manila	(China) Liu Wei	(China) Deng Yaping	(Hong Kong) Chai Po Wa
1992	Hong Kong	(China) Deng Yaping	(China) Guo Jun	(Hong Kong) Chan Tan Lui
1993	Shunde	(China) Liu Wei	(China) Qiao Hong	(North Korea) Ri Pun-hui
1994	Shanghai	(China) Qiao Hong	(South Korea) Kim Moo-kyo	(Singapore) Jing Junhong
1996	New Delhi	(China) Wu Na	(China) Li Ju	(Hong Kong) Chai Po Wa
1997	Pune	(China) Wang Chen	(South Korea) Kim Boon-sik	(Japan) Miyoko Takahashi
2000	Mumbai	(China) Tang Yuan	(China) Guo Yue	(Hong Kong) Lao Sui Fei
2000	Mumbai	(China) Tang Yuan	(China) Guo Yue	(Singapore) Zhang Xueling
2003	Kitakyushu	(China) Fan Ying	(China) Jiang Huajun	(Hong Kong) Tie Yana
2004^{[a]}	Kitakyushu	(Hong Kong) Tie Yana	(Japan) Ai Fukuhara	(Singapore) Li Jiawei
2005	New Delhi	(China) Guo Yan	(China) Li Xiaoxia	(Hong Kong) Tie Yana
2005	New Delhi	(China) Guo Yan	(China) Li Xiaoxia	(Hong Kong) Zhang Rui
2006	Kobe	(China) Wang Nan	(Singapore) Li Jiawei	(China) Li Nan
2007	Hanoi	(Hong Kong) Jiang Huajun	(Singapore) Wang Yuegu	(Japan) Kasumi Ishikawa
2008	Sapporo	(China) Guo Yue	(Singapore) Feng Tianwei	(Singapore) Li Jiawei
2009	Hangzhou	(China) Guo Yue	(China) Liu Shiwen	(China) Ding Ning
2010	Guangzhou	(China) Liu Shiwen	(China) Ding Ning	(Singapore) Feng Tianwei
2011	Changsha^{[b]}	(China) Guo Yan	(Hong Kong) Jiang Huajun	(China) Guo Yue
2012	Guangzhou	(China) Liu Shiwen	(China) Wu Yang	(Singapore) Li Jiawei
2013	Hong Kong	(China) Liu Shiwen	(China) Wu Yang	(Japan) Kasumi Ishikawa
2014	Wuhan	(China) Ding Ning	(China) Li Xiaoxia	(Singapore) Yu Mengyu
2015	Jaipur	(Singapore) Feng Tianwei	(China) Liu Shiwen	(China) Zhu Yuling
2016	Dubai	(China) Liu Shiwen	(China) Li Xiaoxia	(Singapore) Feng Tianwei
2017	Ahmedabad	(China) Zhu Yuling	(China) Liu Shiwen	(Japan) Kasumi Ishikawa
2018	Yokohama	(China) Zhu Yuling	(China) Chen Meng	(Japan) Kasumi Ishikawa
2019	Yokohama	(China) Zhu Yuling	(China) Chen Meng	(Japan) Kasumi Ishikawa
2020	Tournament cancelled due to the COVID-19 pandemic.			
2022	Bangkok	(China) Wang Yidi	(Japan) Mima Ito	(India) Manika Batra
2025	Shenzhen	(China) Wang Manyu	(China) Sun Yingsha	(China) Kuai Man
2026	Haikou	(China) Sun Yingsha	(China) Wang Manyu	(China) Kuai Man

=== Men's team ===
Year	Host city	Gold	Silver	Bronze
1993	Shanghai	(China) China; Lin Zhigang; Liu Guoliang; Ma Wenge; Wang Tao; Zhang Lei	(South Korea) South Korea; Kang Hee-chan; Lee Chul-seung; Yoo Nam-kyu	Chinese Taipei
1993	Shanghai	(China) China; Lin Zhigang; Liu Guoliang; Ma Wenge; Wang Tao; Zhang Lei	(South Korea) South Korea; Kang Hee-chan; Lee Chul-seung; Yoo Nam-kyu	Japan
1995	Shanghai	(China) China; Ding Song; Kong Linghui; Liu Guoliang; Wang Liqin	(South Korea) South Korea; Kang Hee-chan; Kim Taek-soo; Lee Chul-seung	
1997	Shanghai	(Japan) Japan; Kiyonobu Iwasaki; Kōji Matsushita; Hiroshi Shibutani	(China) China; Ding Song; Ma Lin; Wang Fei; Wang Liqin	Chinese Taipei

=== Women's team ===
Year	Host city	Gold	Silver	Bronze
1993	Shanghai	(China) China; Deng Yaping; Liu Wei; Qiao Hong; Tang Weiyi	(Hong Kong) Hong Kong; Chai Po Wa; Chan Suk Yuen; Chan Tan Lui	(South Korea) South Korea; Hong Cha-ok; Park Hae-jung; Ryu Ji-hye
1993	Shanghai	(China) China; Deng Yaping; Liu Wei; Qiao Hong; Tang Weiyi	(Hong Kong) Hong Kong; Chai Po Wa; Chan Suk Yuen; Chan Tan Lui	Japan
1995	Shanghai	(China) China; Deng Yaping; Li Ju; Wang Nan; Yang Ying	(South Korea) South Korea; Kim Moo-kyo; Park Hae-jung; Ryu Ji-hye	
1997	Shanghai	(China) China; Li Ju; Wang Hui; Wang Nan; Yang Ying	(Japan) Japan; Rika Matsuoka; Ai Sakata; Akiko Takeda; Aya Umemura	(Hong Kong) Hong Kong; Chai Po Wa; Chan Tan Lui; Wong Ching

a. The 2004 Women's Asian Cup was postponed to November, 2005. And the 2005 Asian Cup was held in December of the same year.

b. The 24th Asian Cup was scheduled in Yokohama, Japan between March 26–27, 2011. Postponed by Japan Table Tennis Association due to associations’ withdrawal caused by the Tōhoku earthquake.

== Medal table ==
Rank	Nation	Gold	Silver	Bronze	Total
1	China (CHN)	62	52	18	132
2	North Korea (PRK)	4	1	5	10
3	Japan (JPN)	3	4	14	21
4	Hong Kong (HKG)	3	2	15	20
5	Singapore (SIN)	2	4	10	16
6	South Korea (KOR)	0	10	9	19
7	India (IND)	0	1	2	3
8	Chinese Taipei (TPE)	0	0	5	5
Totals (8 entries)		74	74	78	226

== See also ==
- Europe Top 16 Cup
- PanAm Cup
- Asian Table Tennis Championships
