= Table tennis at the Asian Games =

- Governing bodies: ITTF (World) / ATTU (Asia)
- Events: 7 (men: 3; women: 3; mixed: 1)

Games
- 1951; 1954; 1958; 1962; 1966; 1970; 1974; 1978; 1982; 1986; 1990; 1994; 1998; 2002; 2006; 2010; 2014; 2018; 2022; 2026
- Medalists

Table tennis has been contested at the Asian Games since 1958 except in 1970 edition, with singles and doubles events for both men and women.

== Editions ==
Games	Year	Host city	Best nation
III	1958	Tokyo, Japan	Japan
IV	1962	Jakarta, Indonesia	Japan
V	1966	Bangkok, Thailand	Japan
VII	1974	Tehran, Iran	China
VIII	1978	Bangkok, Thailand	China
IX	1982	New Delhi, India	China
X	1986	Seoul, South Korea	China
XI	1990	Beijing, China	China
XII	1994	Hiroshima, Japan	China
XIII	1998	Bangkok, Thailand	China
XIV	2002	Busan, South Korea	China
XV	2006	Doha, Qatar	China
XVI	2010	Guangzhou, China	China
XVII	2014	Incheon, South Korea	China
XVIII	2018	Jakarta–Palembang, Indonesia	China
XVIV	2022	Hangzhou, China	China
XX	2026	Nagoya,Japan	China

== Events ==
Event	58	62	66	74	78	82	86	90	94	98	02	06	10	14	18	22	26	Years
Men's singles	X	X	X	X	X	X	X	X	X	X	X	X	X	X	X	X	X	17
Men's doubles	X	X	X	X	X	X	X	X	X	X	X	X	X	X		X	X	16
Men's team	X	X	X	X	X	X	X	X	X	X	X	X	X	X	X	X	X	17
Women's singles	X	X	X	X	X	X	X	X	X	X	X	X	X	X	X	X	X	17
Women's doubles	X	X	X	X	X	X	X	X	X	X	X	X	X	X		X	X	16
Women's team	X	X	X	X	X	X	X	X	X	X	X	X	X	X	X	X	X	17
Mixed doubles	X	X	X	X	X	X	X	X	X	X	X	X	X	X	X	X	X	17
Total	7	7	7	7	7	7	7	7	7	7	7	7	7	7	5	7	7	117

== Medal table ==
Rank	Nation	Gold	Silver	Bronze	Total
1	China (CHN)	78	43	28	149
2	Japan (JPN)	21	23	46	90
3	South Korea (KOR)	11	31	57	99
4	Hong Kong (HKG)	2	9	11	22
5	North Korea (PRK)	2	4	18	24
6	Vietnam (VIE)	2	0	2	4
7	Chinese Taipei (TPE)	1	4	23	28
8	Singapore (SGP)	0	2	9	11
9	Indonesia (INA)	0	1	0	1
10	Iran (IRI)	0	0	6	6
11	India (IND)	0	0	4	4
12	Thailand (THA)	0	0	2	2
Totals (12 entries)		117	117	206	440
