= Table tennis at the 1998 Asian Games – Men's team =

Men's team at the 1998 Asian Games
- Venue: Thammasat Gymnasium 5
- Dates: 8–12 December 1998
- Nations: 15

Medalists
| gold medal | China; Kong Linghui, Liu Guoliang, Wang Liqin, Yan Sen, Zhang Yong |
| silver medal | South Korea; Kim Taek-soo, Lee Chul-seung, Oh Sang-eun, Park Sang-joon |
| bronze medal | Japan; Seiko Iseki, Hiroshi Shibutani, Toshio Tasaki, Ryo Yuzawa |
| bronze medal | Chinese Taipei; Chang Yen-shu, Chiang Peng-lung, Chuang Chih-yuan, Kuo Chih-hsiang, Wu Wen-chia |

The men's team table tennis event was part of the table tennis programme and took place at the Thammasat Gymnasium 5, in Bangkok.

== Results ==
=== Preliminary round ===
==== Group A ====
| Pos | Team | Pld | W | L | MF | MA | Pts | Qualification |
|---|---|---|---|---|---|---|---|---|
| 1 | China | 3 | 3 | 0 | 9 | 0 | 6 | Quarterfinals |
| 2 | Vietnam | 3 | 2 | 1 | 6 | 4 | 5 | Quarterfinals |
| 3 | Macau | 3 | 1 | 2 | 4 | 8 | 4 | |
| 4 | Nepal | 3 | 0 | 3 | 2 | 9 | 3 | |

Source: Results

==== Group B ====
| Pos | Team | Pld | W | L | MF | MA | Pts | Qualification |
|---|---|---|---|---|---|---|---|---|
| 1 | Japan | 3 | 3 | 0 | 9 | 0 | 6 | Quarterfinals |
| 2 | Iran | 3 | 2 | 1 | 6 | 3 | 5 | Quarterfinals |
| 3 | Yemen | 3 | 1 | 2 | 3 | 6 | 4 | |
| 4 | Maldives | 3 | 0 | 3 | 0 | 9 | 3 | |

Source: Results

==== Group C ====
| Pos | Team | Pld | W | L | MF | MA | Pts | Qualification |
|---|---|---|---|---|---|---|---|---|
| 1 | Chinese Taipei | 2 | 2 | 0 | 6 | 0 | 4 | Quarterfinals |
| 2 | Thailand | 2 | 1 | 1 | 3 | 3 | 3 | Quarterfinals |
| 3 | Qatar | 2 | 0 | 2 | 0 | 6 | 2 | |

Source: Results

==== Group D ====
| Pos | Team | Pld | W | L | MF | MA | Pts | Qualification |
|---|---|---|---|---|---|---|---|---|
| 1 | South Korea | 3 | 3 | 0 | 9 | 1 | 6 | Quarterfinals |
| 2 | North Korea | 3 | 2 | 1 | 7 | 4 | 5 | Quarterfinals |
| 3 | Hong Kong | 3 | 1 | 2 | 4 | 6 | 4 | |
| 4 | Laos | 3 | 0 | 3 | 0 | 9 | 3 | |

Source: Results

=== Knockout round ===
Quarterfinals
A1 | China | 3
Thailand | 0
North Korea | 2
B1 | Japan | 3
C1 | Chinese Taipei | 3
Iran | 0
Vietnam | 0
D1 | South Korea | 3

Semifinals
A1 | China | 3
B1 | Japan | 2
C1 | Chinese Taipei | 1
D1 | South Korea | 3

Final
A1 | China | 3
D1 | South Korea | 1

==== Quarterfinals ====
| China | 3–0 | Thailand |

Kong Linghui | 2–0 | Sanan Ariyachotima | 21–8, 21–11
Liu Guoliang | 2–0 | Chaisit Chaitat | 21–7, 21–5
Zhang Yong | 2–0 | Phakpoom Sanguansin | 21–13, 21–12

| North Korea | 2–3 | Japan |

| Kim Song-hui | 2–1 | Hiroshi Shibutani | 21–17, 13–21, 21–14 |
| Choi Gyong-sob | 0–2 | Toshio Tasaki | 18–21, 20–22 |
| Kim Jin-myong | 1–2 | Seiko Iseki | 16–21, 21–18, 14–21 |
| Kim Song-hui | 2–0 | Toshio Tasaki | 21–13, 21–10 |
| Choi Gyong-sob | 0–2 | Hiroshi Shibutani | 12–21, 14–21 |

| Chinese Taipei | 3–0 | Iran |

Chang Yen-shu | 2–0 | Behnam Rahmatpanah | 21–12, 21–15
Wu Wen-chia | 2–1 | Amin Eskandari | 21–10, 18–21, 21–16
Chuang Chih-yuan | 2–0 | Mohammad Reza Akhlaghpasand | 21–13, 21–8

| Vietnam | 0–3 | South Korea |

Lê Huy | 0–2 | Kim Taek-soo | 16–21, 12–21
Vũ Mạnh Cường | 0–2 | Lee Chul-seung | 14–21, 10–21
Đoàn Kiến Quốc | 0–2 | Oh Sang-eun | 9–21, 11–21

==== Semifinals ====
| China | 3–2 | Japan |

| Kong Linghui | 2–0 | Seiko Iseki | 21–17, 21–14 |
| Liu Guoliang | 2–1 | Hiroshi Shibutani | 20–22, 21–12, 21–17 |
| Wang Liqin | 1–2 | Toshio Tasaki | 14–21, 21–15, 18–21 |
| Kong Linghui | 0–2 | Hiroshi Shibutani | 19–21, 14–21 |
| Liu Guoliang | 2–0 | Seiko Iseki | 21–13, 21–15 |

| Chinese Taipei | 1–3 | South Korea |

Kuo Chih-hsiang | 1–2 | Oh Sang-eun | 14–21, 21–18, 16–21
Chang Yen-shu | 2–0 | Park Sang-joon | 21–15, 21–13
Chuang Chih-yuan | 0–2 | Kim Taek-soo | 13–21, 17–21
Kuo Chih-hsiang | 1–2 | Park Sang-joon | 23–21, 15–21, 13–21

==== Final ====
| China | 3–1 | South Korea |

Liu Guoliang | 2–0 | Kim Taek-soo | 21–13, 21–17
Kong Linghui | 1–2 | Oh Sang-eun | 14–21, 23–21, 18–21
Zhang Yong | 2–0 | Park Sang-joon | 21–16, 21–14
Liu Guoliang | 2–0 | Oh Sang-eun | 21–12, 21–15
