= Table tennis at the 1994 Asian Games =

- Venue: Asakita Ward Sports Center
- Dates: 5–14 October 1994

Table tennis was contested at the 1994 Asian Games in Asakita Ward Sports Center, Hiroshima, Japan from 5 October 1994 to 14 October 1994.

Table tennis had team, doubles and singles events for men and women, as well as a mixed doubles competition.

== Medalists ==
Event	Gold	Silver	Bronze
Men's singles	Wang Tao; China	Yoo Nam-kyu; South Korea	Kim Taek-soo; South Korea
Men's singles	Wang Tao; China	Yoo Nam-kyu; South Korea	Ma Wenge; China
Men's doubles	South Korea; Chu Kyo-sung; Lee Chul-seung	South Korea; Kim Taek-soo; Yoo Nam-kyu	China; Ma Wenge; Zhang Lei
Men's doubles	South Korea; Chu Kyo-sung; Lee Chul-seung	South Korea; Kim Taek-soo; Yoo Nam-kyu	China; Lü Lin; Wang Tao
Men's team	China; Kong Linghui; Lü Lin; Ma Wenge; Wang Tao; Zhang Lei	South Korea; Chu Kyo-sung; Kim Taek-soo; Lee Chul-seung; Park Sang-joon; Yoo Nam-kyu	Japan; Sei Ito; Kiyonobu Iwasaki; Koji Matsushita; Yuji Matsushita; Koichi Takeya
Women's singles	Chire Koyama; Japan	Deng Yaping; China	Chai Po Wa; Hong Kong
Women's singles	Chire Koyama; Japan	Deng Yaping; China	Qiao Hong; China
Women's doubles	China; Liu Wei; Qiao Yunping	China; Deng Yaping; Qiao Hong	South Korea; Kim Boon-sik; Kim Moo-kyo
Women's doubles	China; Liu Wei; Qiao Yunping	China; Deng Yaping; Qiao Hong	South Korea; Park Hae-jung; Ryu Ji-hye
Women's team	China; Deng Yaping; Liu Wei; Qiao Hong; Qiao Yunping	Hong Kong; Chai Po Wa; Chan Suk Yuen; Chan Tan Lui; Cheng To	Japan; Mitsue Endo; Chire Koyama; Keiko Okazaki; Rika Sato
Mixed doubles	China; Kong Linghui; Deng Yaping	Chinese Taipei; Chiang Peng-lung; Xu Jing	South Korea; Yoo Nam-kyu; Park Hae-jung
Mixed doubles	China; Kong Linghui; Deng Yaping	Chinese Taipei; Chiang Peng-lung; Xu Jing	Chinese Taipei; Wu Wen-chia; Chen Jing

== Medal table ==
Rank	Nation	Gold	Silver	Bronze	Total
1	China (CHN)	5	2	4	11
2	South Korea (KOR)	1	3	4	8
3	Japan (JPN)	1	0	2	3
4	Chinese Taipei (TPE)	0	1	1	2
4	Hong Kong (HKG)	0	1	1	2
Totals (5 entries)		7	7	12	26
