= 1987 World Table Tennis Championships – Men's doubles =

1987 Men's doubles

The 1987 World Table Tennis Championships men's doubles was the 39th edition of the men's doubles championship. Wei Qingguang and Chen Longcan won the title after defeating Ilija Lupulesku and Zoran Primorac in the final by two sets to one.

== Results ==
Round of 16
(China) Wei Qingguang (China) Chen Longcan	21	21
(Denmark) Jan Harkamp (Denmark) Lars Hauth	13	11
(Japan) Yoshihito Miyazaki (Japan) Seiji Ono	21	21
(South Korea) Kim Ki-taik (South Korea) Kim Wan	17	11
(Poland) Andrzej Grubba (Poland) Leszek Kucharski	25	17	21
(Soviet Union) Andrei Mazunov (Soviet Union) Boris Rozenberg	23	21	15
(North Korea) Chu Jong-Chol (North Korea) Kim Song Hui	21	21
(China) Chih Chin-Long (China) Hsu Lung-Chan	18	18
(South Korea) Ahn Jae-hyung (South Korea) Yoo Nam-kyu	21	21
(Malaysia) Peong Tah Seng (Malaysia) Tan Liang Check	7	11
(China) Chen Xinhua (China) Wang Hao	21	21
(France) Jacques Secrétin (France) Patrick Birocheau	15	17
(Socialist Federal Republic of Yugoslavia) Ilija Lupulesku (Socialist Federal Republic of Yugoslavia) Zoran Primorac	21	16	21
(Japan) Juzo Nukazuka (Japan) Kiyoshi Saito	11	21	15
(Chinese Taipei) Wu Wen-Chia (Chinese Taipei) Huang Huei-Chien	19	26	6
(China) He Zhiwen (China) Jiang Jialiang	21	24	21

Quarterfinals
(China) Wei Qingguang (China) Chen Longcan	21	21
(Japan) Miyazaki (Japan) Ono	19	12
(Poland) Grubba (Poland) Kucharski	21	21
(North Korea) Chu Chong Choi (North Korea) Kim Song Hui	17	6
(South Korea) Ahn Jae-hyung (South Korea) Yoo Nam-kyu	16	21	22
(China) Chen Xinhua (China) Wang Hao	21	17	20
(Socialist Federal Republic of Yugoslavia) Lupulesku (Socialist Federal Republic of Yugoslavia) Primorac	22	21
(China) He Zhiwen (China) Jiang Jialiang	20	15

Semifinals
(China) Wei Qingguang (China) Chen Longcan	11	21	21
(Poland) Grubba (Poland) Kucharski	21	15	10
(South Korea) Ahn Jae-hyung (South Korea) Yoo Nam-kyu	21	17	20
(Socialist Federal Republic of Yugoslavia) Lupulesku (Socialist Federal Republic of Yugoslavia) Primorac	15	21	22

Final
(China) Wei Qingguang (China) Chen Longcan	21	12	22
(Socialist Federal Republic of Yugoslavia) Lupulesku (Socialist Federal Republic of Yugoslavia) Primorac	17	21	20

== See also ==
List of World Table Tennis Championships medalists
