= Table tennis at the 1990 Asian Games =

Table Tennis Event

- Venue: Workers Indoor Arena
- Dates: 24 September – 1 October 1990

Table tennis was contested at the 1990 Asian Games in Workers Indoor Arena, Beijing, China from September 24 to October 1, 1990.

Table tennis had team, doubles and singles events for men and women, as well as a mixed doubles competition.

== Medalists ==
| Event | Gold | Silver | Bronze |
|---|---|---|---|
| Men's singles | Ma Wenge; China | Wei Qingguang; China | Chen Longcan; China |
| Men's singles | Ma Wenge; China | Wei Qingguang; China | Yoo Nam-kyu; South Korea |
| Men's doubles | China; Ma Wenge; Chen Zhibin | China; Chen Longcan; Wei Qingguang | North Korea; Kim Song-hui; Kim Guk-chol |
| Men's doubles | China; Ma Wenge; Chen Zhibin | China; Chen Longcan; Wei Qingguang | South Korea; Yoo Nam-kyu; Kim Taek-soo |
| Men's team | South Korea; Kang Hee-chan; Kim Taek-soo; Moon Kyu-min; Park Ji-hyun; Yoo Nam-kyu | North Korea; Choi Gyong-sob; Kim Guk-chol; Kim Myong-jun; Kim Song-hui; Ri Gun-sang | China; Chen Longcan; Chen Zhibin; Wei Qingguang; Ma Wenge; Zhang Lei |
| Women's singles | Deng Yaping; China | Gao Jun; China | Qiao Hong; China |
| Women's singles | Deng Yaping; China | Gao Jun; China | Chen Zihe; China |
| Women's doubles | South Korea; Hyun Jung-hwa; Hong Cha-ok | China; Qiao Hong; Deng Yaping | North Korea; Ri Pun-hui; Yu Sun-bok |
| Women's doubles | South Korea; Hyun Jung-hwa; Hong Cha-ok | China; Qiao Hong; Deng Yaping | China; Chen Zihe; Gao Jun |
| Women's team | China; Gao Jun; Chen Zihe; Deng Yaping; Qiao Hong | South Korea; Hong Cha-ok; Hong Soon-hwa; Hyun Jung-hwa; Lee Tae-joo | Hong Kong; Chai Po Wa; Chan Suk Yuen; Chan Tan Lui; Cheng To |
| Mixed doubles | China; Wei Qingguang; Deng Yaping | South Korea; Yoo Nam-kyu; Hyun Jung-hwa | South Korea; Kang Hee-chan; Hong Cha-ok |
| Mixed doubles | China; Wei Qingguang; Deng Yaping | South Korea; Yoo Nam-kyu; Hyun Jung-hwa | China; Chen Zhibin; Chen Zihe |

== Medal table ==
| Rank | Nation | Gold | Silver | Bronze | Total |
|---|---|---|---|---|---|
| 1 | China (CHN) | 5 | 4 | 6 | 15 |
| 2 | South Korea (KOR) | 2 | 2 | 3 | 7 |
| 3 | North Korea (PRK) | 0 | 1 | 2 | 3 |
| 4 | Hong Kong (HKG) | 0 | 0 | 1 | 1 |
| Totals (4 entries) | | 7 | 7 | 12 | 26 |
