= Table tennis at the 1998 Asian Games =

- Venue: Thammasat Gymnasium 5
- Dates: 8–16 December 1998

Table tennis was contested in the 1998 Asian Games held in Bangkok, Thailand from December 8 to December 16, 1998. China maintained its dominance in the event and won total nine medals, with six golds. Kim Taek-soo of South Korea was the only non-Chinese player who won a gold medal, and with his medal South Korea finished second in medal table, with total eight medals. North Korea and Hong Kong both achieved one silver and one bronze, and finished tied at a third spot in a medal table rankings.

== Medalists ==
Event	Gold	Silver	Bronze
Men's singles	Kim Taek-soo; South Korea	Liu Guoliang; China	Oh Sang-eun; South Korea
Men's singles	Kim Taek-soo; South Korea	Liu Guoliang; China	Kong Linghui; China
Men's doubles	China; Kong Linghui; Liu Guoliang	South Korea; Lee Chul-seung; Oh Sang-eun	Chinese Taipei; Wu Wen-chia; Kuo Chih-hsiang
Men's doubles	China; Kong Linghui; Liu Guoliang	South Korea; Lee Chul-seung; Oh Sang-eun	Chinese Taipei; Chiang Peng-lung; Chang Yen-shu
Men's team	China; Kong Linghui; Liu Guoliang; Wang Liqin; Yan Sen; Zhang Yong	South Korea; Kim Taek-soo; Lee Chul-seung; Oh Sang-eun; Park Sang-joon	Japan; Seiko Iseki; Hiroshi Shibutani; Toshio Tasaki; Ryo Yuzawa
Men's team	China; Kong Linghui; Liu Guoliang; Wang Liqin; Yan Sen; Zhang Yong	South Korea; Kim Taek-soo; Lee Chul-seung; Oh Sang-eun; Park Sang-joon	Chinese Taipei; Chang Yen-shu; Chiang Peng-lung; Chuang Chih-yuan; Kuo Chih-hsiang; Wu Wen-chia
Women's singles	Wang Nan; China	Li Ju; China	Chen Jing; Chinese Taipei
Women's singles	Wang Nan; China	Li Ju; China	Ryu Ji-hye; South Korea
Women's doubles	China; Li Ju; Wang Nan	Hong Kong; Chan Tan Lui; Song Ah Sim	South Korea; Ryu Ji-hye; Lee Eun-sil
Women's doubles	China; Li Ju; Wang Nan	Hong Kong; Chan Tan Lui; Song Ah Sim	Chinese Taipei; Xu Jing; Chen Chiu-tan
Women's team	China; Li Ju; Wang Nan; Wu Na; Yang Ying; Zhang Yining	North Korea; Kim Hyang-mi; Kim Hyon-hui; Tu Jong-sil; Wi Bok-sun	South Korea; Kim Moo-kyo; Lee Eun-sil; Lee Kyoung-sun; Park Hae-jung; Ryu Ji-hye
Women's team	China; Li Ju; Wang Nan; Wu Na; Yang Ying; Zhang Yining	North Korea; Kim Hyang-mi; Kim Hyon-hui; Tu Jong-sil; Wi Bok-sun	Hong Kong; Chan Tan Lui; Song Ah Sim; Tong Wun; Wong Ching
Mixed doubles	China; Wang Liqin; Wang Nan	South Korea; Oh Sang-eun; Kim Moo-kyo	North Korea; Kim Song-hui; Kim Hyon-hui
Mixed doubles	China; Wang Liqin; Wang Nan	South Korea; Oh Sang-eun; Kim Moo-kyo	Japan; Ryo Yuzawa; Keiko Okazaki

== Medal table ==
Rank	Nation	Gold	Silver	Bronze	Total
1	China (CHN)	6	2	1	9
2	South Korea (KOR)	1	3	4	8
3	Hong Kong (HKG)	0	1	1	2
3	North Korea (PRK)	0	1	1	2
5	Chinese Taipei (TPE)	0	0	5	5
6	Japan (JPN)	0	0	2	2
Totals (6 entries)		7	7	14	28
