= 2001 World Table Tennis Championships – Men's doubles =

2001 Men's doubles

The 2001 World Table Tennis Championships men's doubles was the 46th edition of the men's doubles championship. Wang Liqin and Yan Sen won the title after defeating Kong Linghui and Liu Guoliang in the final by three sets to nil.

== Results ==
Round of 16
(China) Wang Liqin (China) Yan Sen	21	21
(Japan) Seiko Iseki (Japan) Toshio Tasaki	15	12
(Hong Kong) Cheung Yuk (Hong Kong) Leung Chu Yan	15	21
(South Korea) Lee Chul-seung (South Korea) Ryu Seung-min	21	23
(China) Ma Lin (China) Liu Guozheng	21	22
(France) Christophe Legoût (France) Damien Éloi	12	20
(Chinese Taipei) Chiang Peng-lung (Chinese Taipei) Chang Yen-shu	21	22
(Russia) Maxim Shmyrev (Russia) Fedor Kuzmin	17	20
(France) Jean-Philippe Gatien (France) Patrick Chila	21	15	23
(Germany) Jörg Roßkopf (Germany) Lars Hielscher	8	21	21
(South Korea) Kim Taek-soo (South Korea) Oh Sang-eun	21	21
(Hungary) Ferenc Pazsy (Hungary) Adam Lindner	14	17
(Hong Kong) Li Ching (Hong Kong) Ko Lai Chak	22	21
(Austria) Werner Schlager (Austria) Karl Jindrak	20	16
(Chinese Taipei) Chuang Chih-yuan (Chinese Taipei) Yang Meng-Hsing	11	22	12
(China) Kong Linghui (China) Liu Guoliang	21	20	21

Quarterfinals
(China) Wang Liqin (China) Yan Sen	12	21	21	22
(South Korea) Lee Chul-seung (South Korea) Ryu Seung-min	21	9	19	20
(China) Ma Lin (China) Liu Guozheng	15	24	14
(Chinese Taipei) Chiang Peng-lung (Chinese Taipei) Chang Yun-shu	21	26	21
(France) Gatien (France) Chila	9	18	21	21	18
(South Korea) Kim Taek-soo (South Korea) Oh Sang-eun	21	21	14	15	21
(Hong Kong) Li Ching (Hong Kong) Ko Lai Chak	18	14	15
(China) Kong Linghui (China) Liu Guoliang	21	21	21

Semifinals
(China) Wang Liqin (China) Yan Sen	21	21	15	17	21
(Chinese Taipei) Chiang Peng-lung (Chinese Taipei) Chang Yun-Shu	18	10	21	21	19
(South Korea) Kim Taek-soo (South Korea) Oh Sang-eun	18	11	16
(China) Kong Linghui (China) Liu Guoliang	21	21	21

Final
(China) Wanq Liqing (China) Yan Sen	21	21	21
(China) Kong Linghui (China) Liu Guoliang	11	12	18

== See also ==
List of World Table Tennis Championships medalists
