= 1995 World Table Tennis Championships – Women's team =

1995 Corbillon Cup (women's team)

The 1995 World Table Tennis Championships – Corbillon Cup (women's team) was the 36th edition of the women's team championship.

China won the gold medal defeating South Korea in the final 3–0. Hong Kong won the bronze medal.

== Medalists ==
Event	Gold	Silver	Bronze
	China; Deng Yaping; Liu Wei; Qiao Hong; Qiao Yunping	South Korea; Kim Moo-kyo; Park Hae-jung; Park Kyung-Ae; Ryu Ji-hae	Hong Kong; Chai Po Wa; Chan Tan Lui; Tong Wun; Wan Shuk Kwan

== Final stage knockout phase ==
=== Quarter finals ===
Team One	Team Two	Score
China	Germany	3–0
Romania	Hungary	3–0
South Korea	Sweden	3–1
Hong Kong	Japan	3–0

=== Semifinals ===
Team One	Team Two	Score
South Korea	Hong Kong	3–0
China	Romania	3–1

=== Third-place playoff ===
Team One	Team Two	Score
Hong Kong	Romania	3-?

=== Final ===
Team One	Team Two	Score
China	South Korea	3–0

== See also ==
List of World Table Tennis Championships medalists
