= Table tennis at the 2002 Asian Games – Men's doubles =

Men's doubles at the 2002 Asian Games
- Venue: Dongchun Gymnasium
- Dates: 7–8 October 2002
- Competitors: 42 from 13 nations

Medalists
gold medal	Lee Chul-seung; Ryu Seung-min	South Korea
silver medal	Kim Taek-soo; Oh Sang-eun	South Korea
bronze medal	Ma Lin; Kong Linghui	China
bronze medal	Wang Liqin; Yan Sen	China

The men's doubles table tennis event was part of the table tennis programme and took place between October 7 and 8, at the Dongchun Gymnasium, Ulsan.

== Schedule ==
All times are Korea Standard Time (UTC+09:00)

Date	Time	Event
Monday, 7 October 2002	12:30	1st round
Monday, 7 October 2002	13:15	2nd round
Monday, 7 October 2002	14:45	Quarterfinals
Monday, 7 October 2002	16:30	Semifinals
Tuesday, 8 October 2002	12:00	Final

== Results ==
=== Finals ===
Semifinals							Final
1	Ma Lin (CHN); Kong Linghui (CHN)	6	5	11	4	8
4	Lee Chul-seung (KOR); Ryu Seung-min (KOR)	11	11	5	11	11	4	Lee Chul-seung (KOR); Ryu Seung-min (KOR)	11	3	11	5	11	3	13
3	Wang Liqin (CHN); Yan Sen (CHN)	8	6	10	6		2	Kim Taek-soo (KOR); Oh Sang-eun (KOR)	7	11	9	11	7	11	11
2	Kim Taek-soo (KOR); Oh Sang-eun (KOR)	11	11	12	11

=== Top half ===
==== Section 1 ====
1st round				2nd round					Quarterfinals
				1	Ma Lin (CHN); Kong Linghui (CHN)	11	11	11
Lkhagvadorjiin Altantulga (MGL); Zorigtyn Turbold (MGL)	7	4	6		Đoàn Kiến Quốc (VIE); Trần Tuấn Quỳnh (VIE)	4	3	9
Đoàn Kiến Quốc (VIE); Trần Tuấn Quỳnh (VIE)	11	11	11						1	Ma Lin (CHN); Kong Linghui (CHN)	11	11	11
										Duan Yong Jun (SIN); Cai Xiaoli (SIN)	6	3	6
					Duan Yong Jun (SIN); Cai Xiaoli (SIN)	11	12	11
				8	Ryo Yuzawa (JPN); Koji Sanada (JPN)	6	10	7

==== Section 2 ====
1st round				2nd round						Quarterfinals
				6	Cheung Yuk (HKG); Leung Chu Yan (HKG)	11	11	11
					Khalid Al-Kuwari (QAT); Hamad Al-Hammadi (QAT)	5	3	9
										6	Cheung Yuk (HKG); Leung Chu Yan (HKG)	11	9	9	3
Kim Song-chol (PRK); Pak Won-chol (PRK)	11	11	13							4	Lee Chul-seung (KOR); Ryu Seung-min (KOR)	8	11	11	11
Chuang Chih-yuan (TPE); Chen Cheng-kao (TPE)	4	5	11		Kim Song-chol (PRK); Pak Won-chol (PRK)	9	7	11	15
				4	Lee Chul-seung (KOR); Ryu Seung-min (KOR)	11	11	9	17

=== Bottom half ===
==== Section 3 ====
1st round				2nd round						Quarterfinals
				3	Wang Liqin (CHN); Yan Sen (CHN)	11	18	11
Sirojiddin Ismoilov (TJK); Zafar Shadiev (TJK)	6	3	4		Kim Song-hui (PRK); O Il (PRK)	5	16	7
Kim Song-hui (PRK); O Il (PRK)	11	11	11							3	Wang Liqin (CHN); Yan Sen (CHN)	7	13	11	11
										7	Li Ching (HKG); Ko Lai Chak (HKG)	11	11	7	4
					Toshio Tasaki (JPN); Akira Kito (JPN)	11	8	11	3
				7	Li Ching (HKG); Ko Lai Chak (HKG)	9	11	13	11

==== Section 4 ====
1st round					2nd round					Quarterfinals
					5	Chiang Peng-lung (TPE); Chang Yen-shu (TPE)	12	11	11
Sükheegiin Galbadrakh (MGL); Enkhbatyn Lkhagvasüren (MGL)	6	8	6			Soumyadeep Roy (IND); Subhajit Saha (IND)	10	4	9
Soumyadeep Roy (IND); Subhajit Saha (IND)	11	11	11							5	Chiang Peng-lung (TPE); Chang Yen-shu (TPE)	8	3	3
Mansour Al-Enazi (KUW); Ahmad Mandani (KUW)	4	3	11	6						2	Kim Taek-soo (KOR); Oh Sang-eun (KOR)	11	11	11
Vũ Mạnh Cường (VIE); Nguyễn Nam Hải (VIE)	11	11	8	11		Vũ Mạnh Cường (VIE); Nguyễn Nam Hải (VIE)	8	8	6
					2	Kim Taek-soo (KOR); Oh Sang-eun (KOR)	11	11	11
