= Table tennis at the 2002 Asian Games – Men's team =

Men's team at the 2002 Asian Games
- Venue: Dongchun Gymnasium
- Dates: 1–5 October 2002
- Competitors: 51 from 11 nations

Medalists
gold medal	China; Kong Linghui, Liu Guozheng, Ma Lin, Wang Liqin, Yan Sen
silver medal	South Korea; Joo Sae-hyuk, Kim Taek-soo, Lee Chul-seung, Oh Sang-eun, Ryu Seung-min
bronze medal	Hong Kong; Cheung Yuk, Ko Lai Chak, Leung Chu Yan, Li Ching, Tang Kwok Kei
bronze medal	Chinese Taipei; Chang Yen-shu, Chen Cheng-kao, Chiang Peng-lung, Chuang Chih-yuan, Wu Chih-chi

The men's team table tennis event was part of the table tennis programme and took place between October 1 and 5, at the Dongchun Gymnasium, Ulsan.

== Schedule ==
All times are Korea Standard Time (UTC+09:00)

Date	Time	Event
Tuesday, 1 October 2002	15:30	Preliminary round 1
Wednesday, 2 October 2002	15:30	Preliminary round 2
Thursday, 3 October 2002	14:00	Preliminary round 3
Thursday, 3 October 2002	15:30	Quarterfinals
Friday, 4 October 2002	15:30	Semifinals
Saturday, 5 October 2002	14:00	Final

== Results ==
=== Preliminary round ===
==== Group A ====
Pos	Team	Pld	W	L	MF	MA	Pts	Qualification
1	China	2	2	0	6	0	4	Quarterfinals
2	Qatar	2	1	1	3	3	3	Quarterfinals
3	Kuwait	2	0	2	0	6	0	

Source: Report

1 October	Qatar	3–0	Kuwait

—	3–0	—	Walkover
—	3–0	—	Walkover
—	3–0	—	Walkover

2 October	Kuwait	0–3	China

Mansour Al-Enazi	0–3	Ma Lin	Walkover
Ibrahim Al-Hasan	0–3	Kong Linghui	Walkover
Ali Al-Hasan	0–3	Wang Liqin	Walkover

3 October	China	3–0	Qatar

Wang Liqin	3–0	Hamad Al-Hammadi	11–8, 11–2, 11–3
Ma Lin	3–0	Khalid Al-Kuwari	11–1, 11–2, 11–4
Liu Guozheng	3–0	Ahmed Al-Mohannadi	11–4, 11–4, 11–3

==== Group B ====
Pos	Team	Pld	W	L	MF	MA	Pts	Qualification
1	Chinese Taipei	2	2	0	6	0	4	Quarterfinals
2	Vietnam	2	1	1	3	3	3	Quarterfinals
3	Tajikistan	2	0	2	0	6	0	

Source: Report

1 October	Tajikistan	0–3	Vietnam

Sirojiddin Ismoilov	0–3	Vũ Mạnh Cường	Walkover
Zafar Shadiev	0–3	Đoàn Kiến Quốc	Walkover
Sadi Saidov	0–3	Trần Tuấn Quỳnh	Walkover

2 October	Vietnam	0–3	Chinese Taipei

Vũ Mạnh Cường	0–3	Chiang Peng-lung	4–11, 1–11, 10–12
Đoàn Kiến Quốc	1–3	Chuang Chih-yuan	6–11, 3–11, 11–7, 5–11
Nguyễn Nam Hải	2–3	Chen Cheng-kao	7–11, 11–7, 11–7, 3–11, 8–11

3 October	Chinese Taipei	3–0	Tajikistan

—	3–0	—	Walkover
—	3–0	—	Walkover
—	3–0	—	Walkover

==== Group C ====
Pos	Team	Pld	W	L	MF	MA	Pts	Qualification
1	South Korea	2	2	0	6	0	4	Quarterfinals
2	North Korea	2	1	1	3	3	3	Quarterfinals
3	Mongolia	2	0	2	0	6	2	

Source: Report

1 October	North Korea	3–0	Mongolia

Kim Song-chol	3–0	Lkhagvadorjiin Altantulga	11–9, 11–3, 11–4
Pak Won-chol	3–0	Enkhbatyn Lkhagvasüren	11–3, 11–1, 11–5
O Il	3–0	Zorigtyn Turbold	11–1, 11–2, 11–5

2 October	Mongolia	0–3	South Korea

Lkhagvadorjiin Altantulga	0–3	Joo Sae-hyuk	5–11, 10–12, 1–11
Enkhbatyn Lkhagvasüren	0–3	Ryu Seung-min	4–11, 1–11, 3–11
Zorigtyn Turbold	0–3	Lee Chul-seung	4–11, 4–11, 6–11

3 October	South Korea	3–0	North Korea

Oh Sang-eun	3–0	Pak Won-chol	11–8, 11–5, 11–8
Kim Taek-soo	3–1	Kim Song-hui	4–11, 11–8, 11–5, 11–8
Ryu Seung-min	3–2	O Il	11–6, 8–11, 10–12, 11–9, 11–8

==== Group D ====
Pos	Team	Pld	W	L	MF	MA	Pts	Qualification
1	Hong Kong	1	1	0	3	2	2	Quarterfinals
2	Japan	1	0	1	2	3	1	Quarterfinals

Source: Report

3 October	Japan	2–3	Hong Kong

Ryo Yuzawa	2–3	Cheung Yuk	12–10, 7–11, 11–13, 11–6, 4–11
Koji Matsushita	3–0	Li Ching	11–7, 11–9, 11–2
Toshio Tasaki	0–3	Ko Lai Chak	5–11, 4–11, 7–11
Ryo Yuzawa	3–1	Li Ching	12–10, 11–9, 9–11, 11–9
Koji Matsushita	1–3	Cheung Yuk	8–11, 12–14, 11–7, 12–14

=== Knockout round ===
Quarterfinals
A1	China	3
Japan	0
Vietnam	0
D1	Hong Kong	3
C1	South Korea	3
Qatar	0
North Korea	0
B1	Chinese Taipei	3

Semifinals
A1	China	3
D1	Hong Kong	0
C1	South Korea	3
B1	Chinese Taipei	2

Final
A1	China	3
C1	South Korea	0

==== Quarterfinals ====
3 October	China	3–0	Japan

Kong Linghui	3–2	Koji Matsushita	11–4, 11–13, 11–13, 11–7, 11–6
Ma Lin	3–1	Ryo Yuzawa	11–9, 7–11, 11–6, 11–8
Wang Liqin	3–0	Toshio Tasaki	11–5, 11–6, 11–5

3 October	Vietnam	0–3	Hong Kong

Vũ Mạnh Cường	1–3	Cheung Yuk	11–7, 9–11, 9–11, 8–11
Đoàn Kiến Quốc	0–3	Ko Lai Chak	8–11, 4–11, 8–11
Trần Tuấn Quỳnh	0–3	Leung Chu Yan	5–11, 8–11, 5–11

3 October	South Korea	3–0	Qatar

Lee Chul-seung	3–0	Ahmed Al-Mohannadi	11–7, 11–3, 11–8
Oh Sang-eun	3–0	Hamad Al-Hammadi	11–9, 11–1, 11–5
Kim Taek-soo	3–0	Waleed Abdulla	11–2, 11–6, 11–3

3 October	North Korea	0–3	Chinese Taipei

Kim Song-hui	1–3	Chuang Chih-yuan	8–11, 8–11, 11–3, 3–11
O Il	2–3	Chiang Peng-lung	10–12, 11–7, 11–9, 5–11, 9–11
Pak Won-chol	2–3	Chang Yen-shu	6–11, 7–11, 11–6, 11–7, 8–11

==== Semifinals ====
4 October	China	3–0	Hong Kong

Wang Liqin	3–0	Ko Lai Chak	11–6, 11–6, 11–8
Kong Linghui	3–0	Cheung Yuk	11–9, 11–4, 11–7
Liu Guozheng	3–2	Li Ching	7–11, 11–6, 11–5, 8–11, 13–11

4 October	South Korea	3–2	Chinese Taipei

Kim Taek-soo	2–3	Chuang Chih-yuan	11–8, 11–6, 8–11, 6–11, 10–12
Ryu Seung-min	3–1	Chiang Peng-lung	7–11, 11–9, 11–7, 11–8
Oh Sang-eun	2–3	Chang Yen-shu	11–5, 9–11, 10–12, 11–5, 8–11
Kim Taek-soo	3–1	Chiang Peng-lung	11–7, 11–6, 5–11, 11–4
Ryu Seung-min	3–0	Chuang Chih-yuan	11–8, 11–5, 11–9

==== Final ====
5 October	China	3–0	South Korea

Ma Lin	3–1	Kim Taek-soo	11–7, 9–11, 11–8, 11–4
Kong Linghui	3–2	Ryu Seung-min	7–11, 5–11, 11–9, 11–2, 11–5
Wang Liqin	3–2	Oh Sang-eun	11–1, 6–11, 9–11, 11–8, 12–10

== Non-participating athletes ==
- Yan Sen (CHN)
- Tang Kwok Kei (HKG)
- Akira Kito (JPN)
- Koji Sanada (JPN)
- Ahmad Mandani (KUW)
- Myalyn Ariunbold (MGL)
- Ryu Hyon-sop (PRK)
- Jaber Afifa (QAT)
- Wu Chih-chi (TPE)
