= Table tennis at the 1986 Asian Games =

- Venue: Seoul National University Gymnasium
- Dates: 22–30 September 1986

Table tennis was contested from 22 September 1986 to 30 September 1986 at the 1986 Asian Games in Seoul, South Korea.

Table tennis had team, doubles and singles events for men and women, as well as a mixed doubles competition. China finished first in medal table by winning four gold medals.

== Medalists ==
Event	Gold	Silver	Bronze
Men's singles	Yoo Nam-kyu; South Korea	Hui Jun; China	Yoshihito Miyazaki; Japan
Men's singles	Yoo Nam-kyu; South Korea	Hui Jun; China	Kim Wan; South Korea
Men's doubles	China; Teng Yi; Hui Jun	South Korea; Kim Wan; Yoo Nam-kyu	Japan; Kiyoshi Saito; Juzo Nukazuka
Men's doubles	China; Teng Yi; Hui Jun	South Korea; Kim Wan; Yoo Nam-kyu	South Korea; Ahn Jae-hyung; Park Chang-ik
Men's team	South Korea; Ahn Jae-hyung; Kim Wan; Park Chang-ik; Park Ji-hyun; Yoo Nam-kyu	China; Chen Longcan; Chen Xinhua; Hui Jun; Jiang Jialiang; Teng Yi	Japan; Yoshihito Miyazaki; Juzo Nukazuka; Kiyoshi Saito; Hiroshi Shibutani
Women's singles	Jiao Zhimin; China	He Zhili; China	Mika Hoshino; Japan
Women's singles	Jiao Zhimin; China	He Zhili; China	Yang Young-ja; South Korea
Women's doubles	China; Dai Lili; Geng Lijuan	China; Jiao Zhimin; He Zhili	Japan; Mika Hoshino; Miki Kitsukawa
Women's doubles	China; Dai Lili; Geng Lijuan	China; Jiao Zhimin; He Zhili	South Korea; Yang Young-ja; Hyun Jung-hwa
Women's team	South Korea; Hyun Jung-hwa; Kim Young-mi; Lee Sun; Yang Young-ja	China; Dai Lili; Geng Lijuan; He Zhili; Jiao Zhimin	Japan; Mika Hoshino; Kiyomi Ishida; Miki Kitsukawa; Kyoko Uchiyama
Mixed doubles	China; Teng Yi; Dai Lili	China; Hui Jun; Geng Lijuan	South Korea; Kim Wan; Hyun Jung-hwa
Mixed doubles	China; Teng Yi; Dai Lili	China; Hui Jun; Geng Lijuan	South Korea; Yoo Nam-kyu; Yang Young-ja

== Medal table ==
Rank	Nation	Gold	Silver	Bronze	Total
1	China (CHN)	4	6	0	10
2	South Korea (KOR)	3	1	6	10
3	Japan (JPN)	0	0	6	6
Totals (3 entries)		7	7	12	26
