= Wan Shuk Kwan =

Hong Kong table tennis player

Personal information
- Nationality: Hong Kong
Medal record
Representing Hong Kong
World Table Tennis Championships
Bronze medal – third place	1995	women's team

Wan Shuk Kwan is a former international table tennis player from Hong Kong.

== Table tennis career ==
She won a bronze medal for Hong Kong at the 1995 World Table Tennis Championships in the Corbillon Cup (women's team event) with Chai Po Wa, Chan Tan Lui and Tong Wun.

== See also ==
- List of World Table Tennis Championships medalists
