= Table tennis at the 1982 Asian Games =

- Venue: Pragati Maidan

Table tennis was contested at the 1982 Asian Games in New Delhi, India. Table tennis had team, doubles and singles events for men and women, as well as a mixed doubles competition.

== Medalists ==
Event	Gold	Silver	Bronze
Men's singles	Xie Saike; China	Kiyoshi Saito; Japan	Jo Yong-ho; North Korea
Men's singles	Xie Saike; China	Kiyoshi Saito; Japan	Seiji Ono; Japan
Men's doubles	Japan; Seiji Ono; Hiroyuki Abe	South Korea; Kim Wan; Kim Ki-taik	China; Guo Yuehua; Xie Saike
Men's doubles	Japan; Seiji Ono; Hiroyuki Abe	South Korea; Kim Wan; Kim Ki-taik	China; Hui Jun; Chen Xinhua
Men's team	China; Cai Zhenhua; Chen Xinhua; Guo Yuehua; Hui Jun; Xie Saike	Japan; Hiroyuki Abe; Juzo Nukazuka; Seiji Ono; Kiyoshi Saito; Kenichi Sakamoto	South Korea; Kim Ki-taik; Kim Wan; Park Lee-hee; Yoon Kil-jung
Women's singles	Cao Yanhua; China	Tong Ling; China	Yang Young-ja; South Korea
Women's singles	Cao Yanhua; China	Tong Ling; China	Yoon Kyung-mi; South Korea
Women's doubles	China; Cao Yanhua; Dai Lili	China; Pu Qijuan; Tong Ling	North Korea; Chang Yong-ok; Kim Gyong-sun
Women's doubles	China; Cao Yanhua; Dai Lili	China; Pu Qijuan; Tong Ling	North Korea; Ri Song-suk; Lim Jong-hwa
Women's team	China; Cao Yanhua; Dai Lili; Pu Qijuan; Tong Ling	South Korea; An Hae-sook; Lee Soo-ja; Yang Young-ja; Yoon Kyung-mi	North Korea; Chang Yong-ok; Kim Gyong-sun; Lim Jong-hwa; Ri Song-suk
Mixed doubles	China; Xie Saike; Cao Yanhua	China; Chen Xinhua; Tong Ling	South Korea; Yoon Kil-jung; Yoon Kyung-mi
Mixed doubles	China; Xie Saike; Cao Yanhua	China; Chen Xinhua; Tong Ling	Japan; Hiroyuki Abe; Keiko Yamashita

== Medal table ==
Rank	Nation	Gold	Silver	Bronze	Total
1	China (CHN)	6	3	2	11
2	Japan (JPN)	1	2	2	5
3	South Korea (KOR)	0	2	4	6
4	North Korea (PRK)	0	0	4	4
Totals (4 entries)		7	7	12	26
