= Table tennis at the 1966 Asian Games =

- Venue: Chula Student Union Hall

Table tennis was contested at the 1966 Asian Games in Chula Student Union Hall, Chulalongkorn University, Bangkok, Thailand in December 1966.

Table tennis had team, doubles and singles events for men and women, as well as a mixed doubles competition.

== Medalists ==
Event	Gold	Silver	Bronze
Men's singles	Kim Chung-yong; South Korea	Nobuhiko Hasegawa; Japan	Koji Kimura; Japan
Men's singles	Kim Chung-yong; South Korea	Nobuhiko Hasegawa; Japan	Houshang Bozorgzadeh; Iran
Men's doubles	Japan; Hiroshi Takahashi; Keiichi Miki	Japan; Koji Kimura; Nobuhiko Hasegawa	Republic of China; Li Kou-tin; Yang Cheng-hsiung
Men's doubles	Japan; Hiroshi Takahashi; Keiichi Miki	Japan; Koji Kimura; Nobuhiko Hasegawa	South Korea; Kim Chung-yong; Park Chung-kil
Men's team	Japan; Nobuhiko Hasegawa; Koji Kimura; Keiichi Miki; Hiroshi Takahashi	Republic of China; Chen Jin-lieh; Li Kou-tin; Wong Shan-wu; Yang Cheng-hsiung	South Korea; Cho Chang-suk; Kim Chee-hwa; Kim Chung-yong; Park Chung-kil
Women's singles	Naoko Fukatsu; Japan	Noriko Yamanaka; Japan	Choi Jung-sook; South Korea
Women's singles	Naoko Fukatsu; Japan	Noriko Yamanaka; Japan	Yoon Ki-sook; South Korea
Women's doubles	Japan; Noriko Yamanaka; Naoko Fukatsu	South Korea; Choi Jung-sook; Noh Hwa-ja	Republic of China; Lin Hsin-chi; Lou Chiou-chu
Women's doubles	Japan; Noriko Yamanaka; Naoko Fukatsu	South Korea; Choi Jung-sook; Noh Hwa-ja	Japan; Sachiko Morisawa; Tsunao Isomura
Women's team	Japan; Naoko Fukatsu; Tsunao Isomura; Sachiko Morisawa; Noriko Yamanaka	South Korea; Choi Jung-sook; Jong Hae-ok; Noh Hwa-ja; Yoon Ki-sook	Republic of China; Lin Hsin-chi; Lou Chiou-chu; Tsan Yin-hsieh
Mixed doubles	Japan; Koji Kimura; Naoko Fukatsu	South Korea; Kim Chung-yong; Yoon Ki-sook	Japan; Keiichi Miki; Noriko Yamanaka
Mixed doubles	Japan; Koji Kimura; Naoko Fukatsu	South Korea; Kim Chung-yong; Yoon Ki-sook	South Korea; Park Chung-kil; Choi Jung-sook

== Medal table ==
Rank	Nation	Gold	Silver	Bronze	Total
1	Japan (JPN)	6	3	3	12
2	South Korea (KOR)	1	3	5	9
3	Republic of China (ROC)	0	1	3	4
4	Iran (IRN)	0	0	1	1
Totals (4 entries)		7	7	12	26
