= Tong Wun =

Hong Kong table tennis player

Personal information
- Nationality: Hong Kong
Medal record
Representing Hong Kong
World Table Tennis Championships
Bronze medal – third place	1995	women's team

Tong Wun is a female former international table tennis player from Hong Kong.

== Table tennis career ==
She won a bronze medal for Hong Kong at the 1995 World Table Tennis Championships in the Corbillon Cup (women's team event) with Chai Po Wa, Chan Tan Lui and Wan Shuk Kwan.

She also won a bronze medal during the 1998 Asian Games.

== See also ==
- List of World Table Tennis Championships medalists
