= 2015 Asian Cup Table Tennis Tournament =

Table Tennis Tournament

The 2015 Asian Cup Table Tennis Tournament was held at the Sawai Man singh Stadium in Jaipur, India during March 13-15,2015 and serve as qualification tournament for the 2015 ITTF-World Cup. The event was organized by the Asian Table Tennis Union and the Table Tennis Federation of India. A total prize fund of US$100,000 was on offer. Chinese Xu Xin won the men's event; Singaporean Feng Tianwei won the women's competition.
