= Chang Yong-ok =

North Korean table tennis player

Personal information
- Native name: 장용옥
- Nationality: North Korea
Medal record
Representing North Korea
World Table Tennis Championships
Bronze medal – third place	1983	women's team

Chang Yong-ok is a former international table tennis player from North Korea.

== Table tennis career ==
She won a bronze medal for North Korea at the 1983 World Table Tennis Championships in the Corbillon Cup (women's team event) with Li Song Suk, Kim Gyong-sun and Li Bun-Hui.

She also won two Asian Games medals.

== See also ==
- List of World Table Tennis Championships medalists
