= Table tennis at the 1962 Asian Games =

- Venue: Istora Senayan
- Dates: 25–31 August 1962

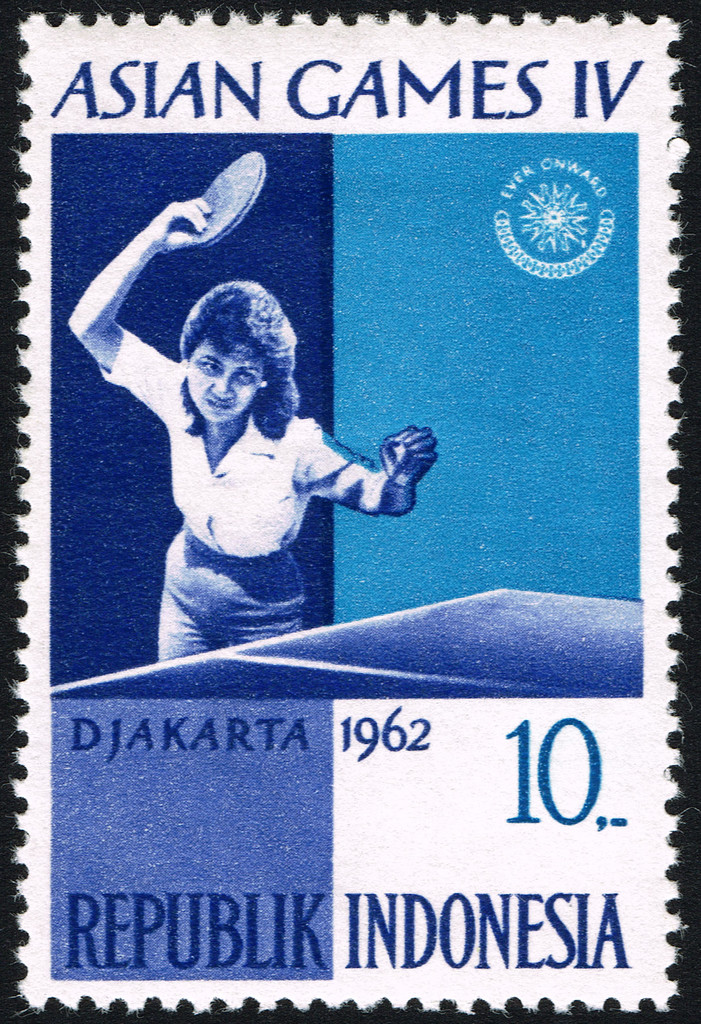
Table tennis at the 1962 Asian Games on a stamp of Indonesia

Table tennis was contested at the 1962 Asian Games at the Istora Senayan in Jakarta, Indonesia, from 25 August 1962 to 31 August 1962.

Table tennis had team, doubles and singles events for men and women, as well as a mixed doubles competition.

== Medalists ==
| Event | Gold | Silver | Bronze |
|---|---|---|---|
| Men's singles | Keiichi Miki; Japan | Ichiro Ogimura; Japan | Koji Kimura; Japan |
| Men's doubles | Japan; Keiichi Miki; Ken Konaka | Japan; Ichiro Ogimura; Koji Kimura | South Vietnam; Lê Văn Tiết; Lê Văn Inh |
| Men's team | Japan; Koji Kimura; Ken Konaka; Keiichi Miki; Ichiro Ogimura | South Korea; Chung Yung-moon; Kang Hi-jung; Kim Kyung-jun; Lee Dal-joon | Singapore; Goh Soo Nam; Lim Jit Choon; Lim Wai Sheng; Sim Poh Lin |
| Women's singles | Kimiyo Matsuzaki; Japan | Kazuko Ito; Japan | Masako Seki; Japan |
| Women's doubles | Japan; Masako Seki; Noriko Yamanaka | South Korea; Hwang Yool-ja; Lee Yung-mi | Japan; Kimiyo Matsuzaki; Kazuko Ito |
| Women's team | Japan; Kazuko Ito; Kimiyo Matsuzaki; Masako Seki; Noriko Yamanaka | Hong Kong; Chan Yee Ching; Choy Yee Shing; Fan Sin Kwan; Baguio Wong | South Korea; Choi Kyung-ja; Hwang Yool-ja; Lee Shin-ja; Lee Yung-mi |
| Mixed doubles | Japan; Ichiro Ogimura; Kimiyo Matsuzaki | Japan; Koji Kimura; Kazuko Ito | Japan; Keiichi Miki; Masako Seki |

== Medal table ==
| Rank | Nation | Gold | Silver | Bronze | Total |
|---|---|---|---|---|---|
| 1 | Japan (JPN) | 7 | 4 | 4 | 15 |
| 2 | South Korea (KOR) | 0 | 2 | 1 | 3 |
| 3 | Hong Kong (HKG) | 0 | 1 | 0 | 1 |
| 4 | Singapore (SIN) | 0 | 0 | 1 | 1 |
| 4 | South Vietnam (VNM) | 0 | 0 | 1 | 1 |
| Totals (5 entries) | | 7 | 7 | 7 | 21 |
