= Nobuhiko Hasegawa =

Japanese table tennis player (1947–2005)

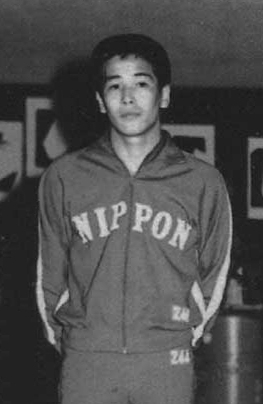
- Hasegawa at the 1966 Asian Games

Personal information
- Born: 5 March 1947 Seto, Aichi, Japan
- Died: 7 November 2005 (aged 58) Kiryu, Gunma, Japan

Sport
- Sport: Table tennis
- Club: Aichi Technical College
Medal record
Representing Japan
World Championships
Gold medal – first place	1967 Stockholm	Team
Gold medal – first place	1967 Stockholm	Singles
Gold medal – first place	1967 Stockholm	Mixed doubles
Bronze medal – third place	1967 Stockholm	Doubles
Gold medal – first place	1969 Munich	Team
Gold medal – first place	1969 Munich	Mixed doubles
Silver medal – second place	1969 Munich	Doubles
Silver medal – second place	1971 Nagoya	Team
Bronze medal – third place	1971 Nagoya	Doubles
Bronze medal – third place	1973 Sarajevo	Team
Asian Games
Gold medal – first place	1966 Bangkok	Team
Silver medal – second place	1966 Bangkok	Singles
Silver medal – second place	1966 Bangkok	Doubles
Gold medal – first place	1974 Tehran	Doubles
Silver medal – second place	1974 Tehran	Team

Nobuhiko Hasegawa (長谷川 信彦, Hasegawa Nobuhiko; March 5, 1947 – November 7, 2005) was one of the best table tennis players worldwide from 1966 to 1974.

== Table tennis career ==
From 1966 until 1974 he won five gold medals at world championships and two golds at the Asian Games.

In total he won ten World Championship medals His mixed doubles partners were Noriko Yamanaka and Yasuko Konno respectively and his men's doubles partners were Mitsuru Kono and Tokio Tasaka.

Hasegawa was a famous exponent of heavy topspin forehand attack, combined with lob defence. He used a modified shakehands grip with the index finger pointing down the center of the blade. This made his backhand a little awkward for fast attack, so even though a shakehander his tactics were similar to the Japanese penholders with wonderful footwork.

Hasegawa died while felling trees near his home and was buried under a tree.

== See also ==
- List of table tennis players
- List of World Table Tennis Championships medalists
