= Yoshihito Miyazaki =

Japanese table tennis player

Personal information
- Nationality: Japan
- Born: 8 April 1959 (age 67)
- Height: 5 ft 10 in (1.78 m)
- Weight: 165 lb (75 kg)

Sport
- Sport: Table tennis
Medal record
Men's table tennis
Representing Japan
Asian Games
Bronze medal – third place	1986 Seoul	Men's singles
Bronze medal – third place	1986 Seoul	Men's team

Yoshihito Miyazaki (born 8 April 1959) is a Japanese former international table tennis player.

Miyazaki won two bronze medals for Japan at the 1986 Asian Games in Seoul. He returned to Seoul for the 1988 Summer Olympics, where he finished fourth in his group for singles and third in doubles (with Seiji Ono).
