= Keiichi Miki =

Japanese table tennis player

Personal information
- Full name: Miki Keiichi
- Nationality: Japan

Sport
- Sport: Table tennis
Medal record
Men's table tennis
Representing Japan
Asian Games
Gold medal – first place	1966 Bangkok	Doubles
Bronze medal – third place	1966 Bangkok	Mixed
Gold medal – first place	1966 Bangkok	Team
Gold medal – first place	1962 Jakarta	Singles
Gold medal – first place	1962 Jakarta	Doubles
Bronze medal – third place	1962 Jakarta	Mixed
Gold medal – first place	1962 Jakarta	Team

Keiichi Miki is a former international table tennis player from Japan.

== Table tennis career ==
In 1962 and 1966 he won several medals in singles, doubles, and team events in the Asian Games.

He won three World Championship medals; one silver medal in the team event, one bronze medal in the doubles with Ken Konaka and another silver in the mixed doubles with Masako Seki.

== See also ==
- List of table tennis players
- List of World Table Tennis Championships medalists
