= Yoon Ki-sook =

South Korean table tennis player

Yoon Ki-Sook
Personal information
- Full name: YOON Ki Sook
- Nationality: South Korea

Sport
- Sport: Table tennis
Medal record
Women's table tennis
Representing South Korea
Asian Championships
Gold medal – first place	1967 Singapore	Singles
Silver medal – second place	1967 Singapore	Team
Asian Games
Silver medal – second place	1966 Bangkok	Mixed doubles
Bronze medal – third place	1966 Bangkok	Singles
Silver medal – second place	1966 Bangkok	Team

- Yoon Ki-sook
- Hangul: 윤기숙
- Hanja: 尹基淑
- RR: Yun Gisuk
- MR: Yun Kisuk

Yoon Ki-Sook is a former female table tennis player from South Korea. In 1967 she won two medals in single and team events in the Asian Table Tennis Championships.

== See also ==
- List of table tennis players
