= Table tennis at the 1974 Asian Games =

- Venue: Aryamehr Sport Complex
- Dates: 8–15 September 1974

Table tennis was contested at the 1974 Asian Games in Tehran, Iran from 8 to 15 September 1974.

Table tennis had team, doubles and singles events for men and women, as well as a mixed doubles competition. China finished first in medal table with six gold medals.

== Medalists ==
| Event | Gold | Silver | Bronze |
|---|---|---|---|
| Men's singles | Liang Geliang; China | Mitsuru Kono; Japan | Yun Chol; North Korea |
| Men's doubles | Japan; Nobuhiko Hasegawa; Mitsuru Kono | China; Li Zhenshi; Liang Geliang | China; Xi Enting; Xu Shaofa |
| Men's team | China; Li Zhenshi; Liang Geliang; Xi Enting; Xu Shaofa; Zeng Boxiong | Japan; Nobuhiko Hasegawa; Mitsuru Kono; Kenji Koyama; Masayuki Kuze; Takashi Tamura | North Korea; Jo Yong-ho; Kong Jae-gyu; O Sung-sam; Yun Chol |
| Women's singles | Zhang Li; China | Chung Hyun-sook; South Korea | Hu Yulan; China |
| Women's doubles | China; Zhang Li; Zheng Huaiying | Japan; Tomie Edano; Yukie Ozeki | North Korea; Kim Chang-ae; Pak Yung-sun |
| Women's team | China; Hu Yulan; Huang Xiping; Zhang Li; Zheng Huaiying | South Korea; Chung Hyun-sook; Kim Jin-hi; Kim Soon-ok; Lee Ailesa | Japan; Tomie Edano; Yukie Ozeki; Fumiko Shinpo; Shoko Takahashi |
| Mixed doubles | China; Liang Geliang; Zheng Huaiying | South Korea; Kang Moon-soo; Kim Soon-ok | Japan; Mitsuru Kono; Tomie Edano |

== Medal table ==
| Rank | Nation | Gold | Silver | Bronze | Total |
|---|---|---|---|---|---|
| 1 | China (CHN) | 6 | 1 | 2 | 9 |
| 2 | Japan (JPN) | 1 | 3 | 2 | 6 |
| 3 | South Korea (KOR) | 0 | 3 | 0 | 3 |
| 4 | North Korea (PRK) | 0 | 0 | 3 | 3 |
| Totals (4 entries) | | 7 | 7 | 7 | 21 |
