= Kyoko Uchiyama =

Japanese table tennis player

Personal information
- Nationality: Japanese
- Born: 16 November 1968 (age 57)

Sport
- Sport: Table tennis

Kyoko Uchiyama (内山 京子, Uchiyama Kyōko; born 16 November 1968) is a Japanese table tennis player. She competed in the women's singles event at the 1988 Summer Olympics.
