= Chen Zhibin =

German table tennis player

Personal information
- Nationality: China Germany
- Born: 21 October 1962 (age 63) Shontung, Nr Beijing
Medal record
Representing China
World Table Tennis Championships
Bronze medal – third place	1989	Mixed Doubles

Chen Zhibin (born 21 October 1962) is a Chinese former international table tennis player and current coach.

He won a bronze medal at the 1989 World Table Tennis Championships in the mixed doubles with Gao Jun.

In 2000, Chen Zhibin became a German citizen and represented Germany. From 2011 to 2014 he worked as national coach in the Netherlands for the women's and since 2016 he has been the national coach of the women's team in Singapore.

== See also ==
- List of table tennis players
- List of World Table Tennis Championships medalists
