= Park Sang-joon =

South Korean table tennis player

Park Sang-Joon
Personal information
- Nationality: South Korea
- Born: 1974 (age 51–52)
Medal record
Representing South Korea
World Table Tennis Championships
| Bronze medal – third place | 1999 | Men's Doubles |

Park Sang-Joon (born 1974) is a male South Korean former international table tennis player.

He won a bronze medal at the 1999 World Table Tennis Championships in the men's doubles with Kim Taek-soo.

== See also ==
- List of table tennis players
