= Chen Longcan =

Chinese table tennis player

Personal information
- Nationality: China
- Born: 21 March 1965 (age 61) Xindu, Sichuan, China

Sport
- Sport: Table tennis
- Playing style: right-handed
Medal record
Men's table tennis
Representing China
Olympic Games
Gold medal – first place	1988 Seoul	Doubles
World Table Tennis Championships
Gold medal – first place	1985 Gothenburg	Team
Silver medal – second place	1985 Gothenburg	Singles
Gold medal – first place	1987 New Delhi	Team
Gold medal – first place	1987 New Delhi	Doubles
Silver medal – second place	1989 Dortmund	Team
Bronze medal – third place	1989 Dortmund	Doubles
Bronze medal – third place	1989 Dortmund	Mixed Doubles
Asian Games
Silver medal – second place	1986 Seoul	Team
Silver medal – second place	1990 Beijing	Doubles
Bronze medal – third place	1990 Beijing	Team

Chen Longcan (Chinese: 陈龙灿; pinyin: Chén Lóng-càn; born March 31, 1965) is a Chinese table tennis player.

== Table tennis career ==
He won a gold medal in the men's doubles with Wei Qingguang in the 1988 Seoul Olympic Games.

His seven World Championship medals included three gold medals; one in the doubles with Wei Qingguang at the 1987 World Table Tennis Championships and two in the team event.

== Achievements ==
- 1985 World Championships - 1st team
- 1986 World Cup - 1st singles
- 1987 World Championships - 1st team & doubles (with Wei Qingguang)
- 1988 Seoul Olympic Games - 1st doubles (with Wei Qingguang)
- 1989 World Championships - 3rd doubles

He also won an English Open title.

== See also ==
- List of table tennis players
- List of World Table Tennis Championships medalists
