= Choi Gyong-sob =

North Korean table tennis player

Personal information
- Nationality: North Korean
- Born: 29 May 1972 (age 53)

Sport
- Sport: Table tennis

Choi Gyong-sob (born 29 May 1972) is a North Korean table tennis player. He competed at the 1992 Summer Olympics and the 1996 Summer Olympics.
