= Kang Hee-chan =

South Korean table tennis player

Kang Hee-Chan
Personal information
- Full name: KANG Hee Chan
- Nationality: South Korea
- Born: 10 May 1970 (age 56)

Sport
- Sport: Table tennis
Medal record
Men's table tennis
Representing South Korea
Olympic Games
Bronze medal – third place	1992 Barcelona	Doubles
World Cup
Bronze medal – third place	1992 Las Vegas	Doubles
Asian Championships
Gold medal – first place	1992 New Delhi	Doubles
Gold medal – first place	1996 Kallang	Team
Silver medal – second place	1992 New Delhi	Singles
Silver medal – second place	1996 Kallang	Doubles

Kang Hee-Chan (Korean: 강희찬; Hanja: 姜煕燦, born 10 May 1970) is a former table tennis player from South Korea. At the 1992 Summer Olympics in Barcelona he won the bronze medal in the men's doubles this time together with Lee Chul-Seung.
