= Kim Wan =

South Korean table tennis player

Personal information
- Full name: Kim Wan
- Nationality: South Korea
- Born: 27 March 1961 (age 65)

Sport
- Sport: Table tennis
Medal record
Men's table tennis
Representing South Korea
World Cup
Silver medal – second place	1984 Kuala Lumpur	Singles
Bronze medal – third place	1986 Port of Spain	Singles
Asian Championships
Silver medal – second place	1986 Shenzhen	Mixed Doubles
Bronze medal – third place	1984 Islamabad	Doubles
Bronze medal – third place	1988 Niigata	Doubles

Kim Wan (born 27 March 1961) is a former table tennis player from South Korea. From 1984 to 1988, he won several medals in double events in the Asian Table Tennis Championships. He also won a silver and a bronze medal in the Table Tennis World Cup in 1984 and 1986, respectively. He competed at the 1988 Summer Olympics.
