= Chan Suk Yuen =

Hong Kong table tennis player

Personal information
- Nationality: Hong Konger
- Born: 25 June 1969 (age 56)

Sport
- Sport: Table tennis

Chan Suk Yuen (Chinese: 陳淑媛; born 25 June 1969) is a Hong Kong table tennis player. She competed in the women's singles event at the 1992 Summer Olympics.
