= Kiyoshi Saito (table tennis) =

Japanese table tennis player

Personal information
- Nationality: Japan
- Born: 30 September 1962 (age 63) Shōnai, Yamagata, Japan
- Height: 164 cm (65 in)
- Weight: 65 kg (143 lb)

Sport
- Sport: Table tennis
Medal record
Men's table tennis
Representing Japan
Asian Games
| Silver medal – second place | 1982 New Delhi | Men's singles |
| Silver medal – second place | 1982 New Delhi | Men's team |
| Bronze medal – third place | 1986 Seoul | Men's doubles |
| Bronze medal – third place | 1986 Seoul | Men's team |
Asian Championships
| Bronze medal – third place | 1982 Jakarta | Men's singles |
| Bronze medal – third place | 1984 Islamabad | Mixed doubles |
Asian Cup
| Gold medal – first place | 1989 Beijing | Men's singles |

Kiyoshi Saito (斎藤 清, Saitō Kiyoshi; born 30 September 1962) is a Japanese former international table tennis player.

Born in Shōnai, Saito represented Japan in table tennis at the 1988 Summer Olympics. In the singles event he went 5–2 in the group stage, but missed out on qualifying for the knockout rounds, finishing third in his group.
