= Wu Wen-chia =

Taiwanese table tennis player (born 1963)

Personal information
- Nationality: Chinese Taipei
- Born: 24 October 1963 (age 62)
- Height: 170 cm (67 in)
- Weight: 70 kg (150 lb)

Sport
- Sport: Table tennis
Medal record
Men's table tennis
Representing Chinese Taipei
Asian Games
Bronze medal – third place	1994 Hiroshima	Mixed doubles
Bronze medal – third place	1998 Bangkok	Men's doubles
Bronze medal – third place	1998 Bangkok	Men's team
Asian Table Tennis Championships
Silver medal – second place	1990 Kuala Lumpur	Men's doubles
Bronze medal – third place	1994 Tianjin	Men's doubles

Wu Wen-chia (born 24 October 1963) is a Taiwanese former international table tennis player.

Wu, who was the U.S. Open champion in 1984, represented Chinese Taipei at two Olympic Games and won three Asian Games bronze medals for his country.

At the 1988 Summer Olympics in Seoul, he won three singles matches to finish fourth from eight competitors in his group. In the doubles, he and partner Huang Huei-chieh were third in their group, one place outside of qualifying for the knockout stage.

He also competed at the 1996 Summer Olympics in Atlanta, where he featured only in the doubles event, partnering Chiang Peng-lung.
