= Yoo Nam-kyu =

South Korean table tennis player

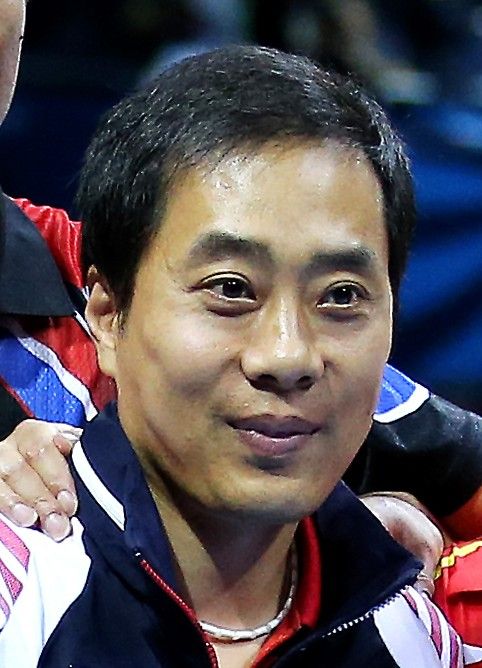

Personal information
- Full name: Yoo Nam-kyu
- Nationality: South Korea
- Born: 4 June 1968 (age 58)

Sport
- Sport: Table tennis
Medal record
Men's table tennis
Representing South Korea
Olympic Games
Gold medal – first place	1988 Seoul	Singles
Bronze medal – third place	1988 Seoul	Doubles
Bronze medal – third place	1992 Barcelona	Doubles
Bronze medal – third place	1996 Atlanta	Doubles
World Championships
Gold medal – first place	1989 Dortmund	Mixed Doubles
Silver medal – second place	1993 Gothenburg	Mixed Doubles
Bronze medal – third place	1987 New Delhi	Doubles
Bronze medal – third place	1993 Gothenburg	Doubles
Bronze medal – third place	1995 Tianjin	Team
Bronze medal – third place	1997 Manchester	Team
World Cup
Gold medal – first place	1990 Seoul	Doubles
Gold medal – first place	1992 Las Vegas	Doubles
Gold medal – first place	1995 Atlanta	Team
Bronze medal – third place	1992 Ho Chi Minh City	Singles
Asian Championships
Gold medal – first place	1988 Niigata	Mixed Doubles
Gold medal – first place	1990 Kuala Lumpur	Mixed Doubles
Silver medal – second place	1988 Niigata	Singles
Silver medal – second place	1998 Osaka	Doubles
Silver medal – second place	1998 Osaka	Team
Bronze medal – third place	1988 Niigata	Doubles

- Korean name
- Hangul: 유남규
- Hanja: 劉南奎
- RR: Yu Namgyu
- MR: Yu Namgyu

Yoo Nam-kyu (born June 4, 1968) is a former table tennis player from South Korea who competed in the 1988, the 1992 and in the 1996 Summer Olympics.

== Table tennis career ==
=== Olympics ===
In 1988 he won the gold medal in the men's singles and the bronze medal in the men's doubles together with Ahn Jae-hyung. Four years later he won the bronze medal in the men's doubles together with Kim Taek-soo. In Atlanta 1996 he won again the bronze medal in the men's doubles this time together with Lee Chul-seung.

=== World Championships ===
He won six World Championship medals including a gold medal in the mixed doubles with Hyun Jung-hwa at the 1989 World Table Tennis Championships.

=== Other ===
In the 1985/1986 season he played in the Swedish first league for Ängby SK. In 1986 he won the Asian Games both in singles and in team.

== See also ==
- List of table tennis players
- List of World Table Tennis Championships medalists
