= Chang Yen-shu =

Taiwanese table tennis player

Chang Yen-shu (Chinese: 張雁書; born 11 February 1979) is a Taiwanese professional table tennis player representing Taiwan.

== Career highlights ==
Summer Olympic Games
2000, Sydney, men's singles, last 32
2000, Sydney, men's doubles, quarter final
World Championships
1999, Eindhoven, men's doubles, quarter final
2001, Osaka, men's doubles, semi final
2007, Zagreb, men's doubles, semi final
Pro Tour Grand Finals
2000, Kobe, men's doubles, semi final
2001, Hainan, men's doubles, quarter final
Pro Tour Meetings
1999, Doha, men's doubles, winner (gold)
1999, Melbourne, men's doubles, runner-up (silver)
1999, Bremen, men's doubles, winner (gold)
1999, Prague, men's doubles, runner-up (silver)
2000, Zagreb, men's doubles, winner (gold)
2000, Kobe, men's doubles, runner-up (silver)
2000, Toulouse, men's doubles, winner (gold)
2001, Doha, men's doubles, winner (gold)
2001, Fort Lauderdale, men's doubles, winner (gold)
2008, Velenje, men's doubles, winner (gold)
Asian Championships
1998, Osaka, men's doubles, quarter final
2000, Doha, men's doubles, winner (gold)
2000, Doha, mixed doubles, semi final
2000, Doha, team competition, 2nd (silver)
2003, Bangkok, team competition, 2nd (silver)
Asian Games
1998, Bangkok, men's singles, quarter final
1998, Bangkok, men's doubles, semi final
1998, Bangkok, mixed doubles, quarter final
2002, Busan, men's doubles, quarter final
Asian Top-12 Championships
1999, Kish Island, quarter final
