= Chai Po Wa =

Hong Kong table tennis player

Tsai Po-Wah
Personal information
- Full name: Tsai Po-Wah / Qi Baohua
- Nationality: Chinese (Hong Kong)
- Born: 12 April 1966 (age 60)

Sport
- Sport: Table tennis
Medal record
Women's table tennis
Representing HKG
World Championships
Bronze medal – third place	1989 Dortmund	Team
Bronze medal – third place	1993 Gothenburg	Doubles
Bronze medal – third place	1995 Tianjin	Team
Bronze medal – third place	1997 Manchester	Doubles
Friendship Games
Gold medal – first place	1984 Moscow	Women's singles
Silver medal – second place	1984 Moscow	Women's doubles
Asian Championships
Gold medal – first place	1992 New Delhi	Team
Silver medal – second place	1994 Tianjin	Team
Silver medal – second place	1996 Tianjin	Team

Tsai Po-Wah (Chinese: 齊寶華; Jyutping: cai4 bou2 waa4; pinyin: Qí Bǎohuá, born 12 April 1966) or Qi Baohua is a table tennis player from Hong Kong. From 1989 to 1997 she won several medals in singles, doubles, and team events in the Asian Table Tennis Championships and in the World Table Tennis Championships. She also competed at the 1992 Summer Olympics and the 1996 Summer Olympics.

She is the sister of Qi Baoxiang, also a table tennis player.
