= Wei Qingguang =

Chinese table tennis player

Wei Qingguang (Seiko Iseki)
Personal information
- Full name: Wei Qingguang
- Nationality: China; Japan
- Born: 2 July 1962 (age 64) Nanning, Guangxi

Sport
- Sport: Table tennis
Medal record
Men's table tennis
Representing China
Olympic Games
Gold medal – first place	1988 Seoul	Doubles

Wei Qingguang, (simplified Chinese: 韦晴光; traditional Chinese: 韋晴光) later Seiko Iseki (Japanese: 偉関 晴光; born July 2, 1962) is a Chinese table tennis player.

== Table tennis player ==
He won the 1988 Seoul Olympic Games in the doubles with Chen Longcan. Later he represented Japan and changed his name to Seiko Iseki.

He won a gold medal in the doubles with Chen Longcan at the 1987 World Table Tennis Championships.

== Achievements ==
- 1984 National Championships - 1st singles, mixed doubles & team
- 1985 National Championships - 1st doubles & mixed doubles
- 1986 Asian Cup - 1st singles
- 1987 World Championships - 1st doubles (with Chen Longcan)
- 1988 Olympic Games - 1st doubles (with Chen Longcan)
- 1989 World Championships - 3rd doubles

== See also ==
- List of table tennis players
- List of World Table Tennis Championships medalists
