= Chan Tan Lui =

Hong Kong table tennis player

Personal information
- Full name: Chan Tan Lui
- Nationality: China Hong Kong
- Born: 12 April 1969 (age 57)

Sport
- Sport: Table tennis
Medal record
Women's table tennis
Representing Hong Kong
World Championships
Bronze medal – third place	1989 Dortmund	Team
Bronze medal – third place	1991 Chiba City	Singles
Bronze medal – third place	1993 Gothenburg	Doubles
Bronze medal – third place	1995 Tianjin	Team
Asian Championships
Gold medal – first place	1992 New Delhi	Team
Silver medal – second place	1994 Tianjin	Team
Silver medal – second place	1996 Tianjin	Team

Chan Tan Lui (Chinese: 陳丹蕾; Jyutping: can^{4} daan^{1} leoi^{5}, born 12 April 1969) is a Chinese-born Hong Kong table tennis player. From 1989 to 1996 she won several medals in singles, doubles, and team events in the Asian Table Tennis Championships and in the World Table Tennis Championships. She also competed at the 1992 Summer Olympics and the 1996 Summer Olympics.
