= Lee Chul-seung =

South Korean table tennis player

Personal information
- Nationality: South Korea
- Born: 29 June 1972 (age 54)

Sport
- Sport: Table tennis
Medal record
Men's table tennis
Representing South Korea
Olympic Games
Bronze medal – third place	1992 Barcelona	Doubles
Bronze medal – third place	1996 Atlanta	Doubles
World Championships
Bronze medal – third place	1995 Tianjin	Mixed doubles
Bronze medal – third place	1995 Tianjin	Team
Bronze medal – third place	1997 Manchester	Team
Bronze medal – third place	2001 Osaka	Team
Asian Games
Gold medal – first place	1994 Hiroshima	Doubles
Gold medal – first place	2002 Busan	Doubles
Silver medal – second place	1994 Hiroshima	Team
Silver medal – second place	1998 Bangkok	Doubles
Silver medal – second place	1998 Bangkok	Team
Silver medal – second place	2002 Busan	Team

Lee Chul-Seung (Korean: 이철승; born June 29, 1972) is a male former table tennis player from South Korea. At the 1992 Summer Olympics in Barcelona he won the bronze medal in the men's doubles this time together with Kang Hee-Chan. Four years later he won the bronze medal in the men's doubles again together with Yoo Nam-Kyu at the 1996 Summer Olympics in Atlanta, United States.

He is best known as one of the best doubles players in South Korea for most of the 1990s and into the early 2000s (decade), teaming up with six different partners.
