= Kong Linghui =

Chinese table tennis player

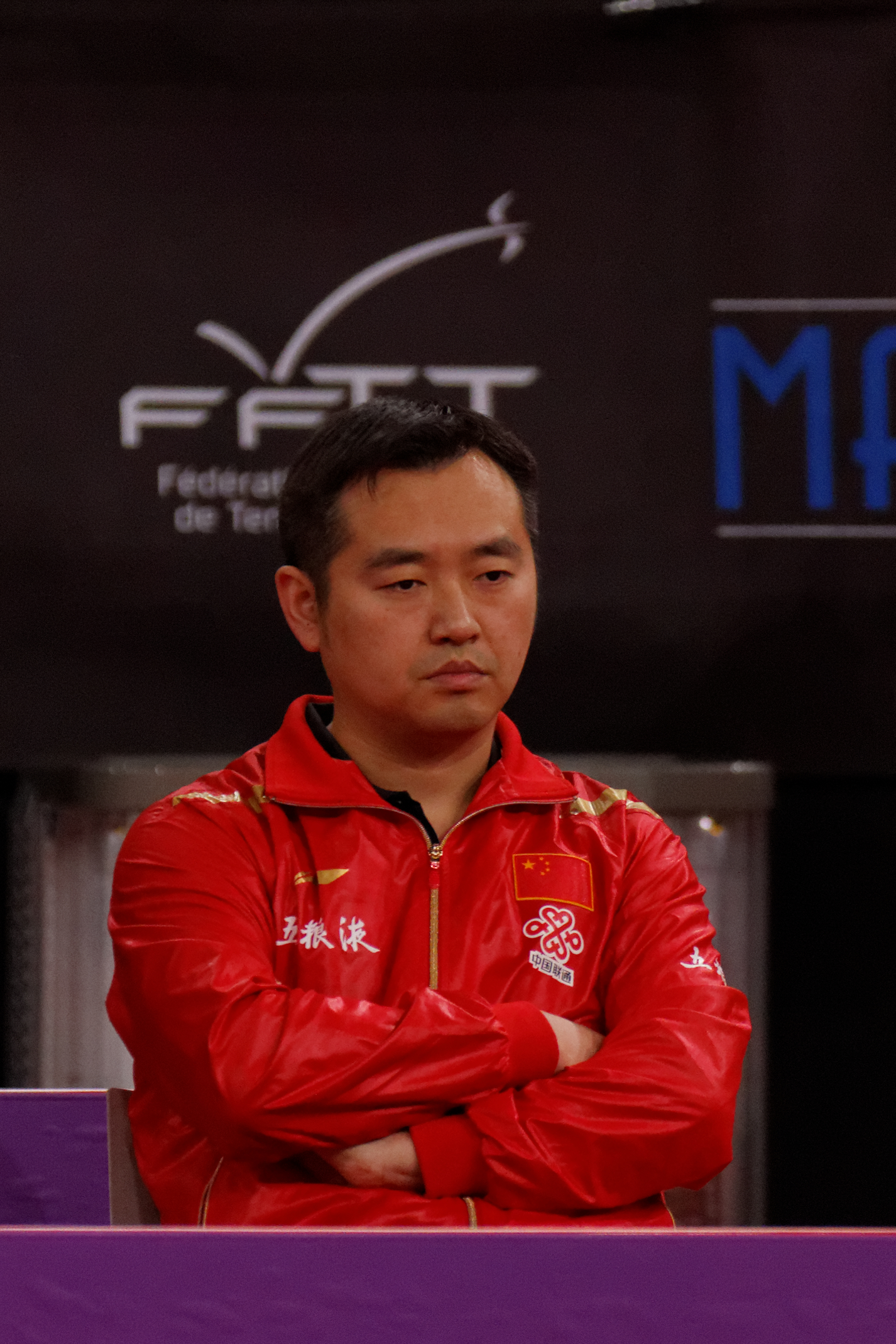
- Linghui in May 2013

Personal information
- Native name: 孔令辉
- Nationality: Chinese
- Born: 18 October 1975 (age 50) Harbin, Heilongjiang, China

Sport
- Sport: Table tennis
- Playing style: Shake hands grip
Medal record
Men's table tennis
Representing China
Olympic Games
Gold medal – first place	1996 Atlanta	Doubles
Gold medal – first place	2000 Sydney	Singles
Silver medal – second place	2000 Sydney	Doubles
World Championships
Gold medal – first place	1995 Tianjin	Singles
Gold medal – first place	1995 Tianjin	Team
Gold medal – first place	1997 Manchester	Doubles
Gold medal – first place	1997 Manchester	Team
Gold medal – first place	1999 Eindhoven	Doubles
Gold medal – first place	2001 Osaka	Team
Gold medal – first place	2004 Doha	Team
Gold medal – first place	2005 Shanghai	Doubles
Silver medal – second place	1995 Tianjin	Mixed Doubles
Silver medal – second place	1997 Manchester	Mixed Doubles
Silver medal – second place	2000 Kuala Lumpur	Team
Silver medal – second place	2001 Osaka	Singles
Silver medal – second place	2001 Osaka	Doubles
Silver medal – second place	2003 Paris	Doubles
Bronze medal – third place	1997 Manchester	Singles
Bronze medal – third place	2003 Paris	Singles
World Cup
Gold medal – first place	1995 Nimes	Singles
Silver medal – second place	1997 Nimes	Singles
Silver medal – second place	2002 Jinan	Singles
Asian Championships
Gold medal – first place	1994 Tianjin	Singles
Gold medal – first place	1994 Tianjin	Mixed Doubles
Gold medal – first place	1994 Tianjin	Team
Gold medal – first place	1996 Kallang	Singles
Gold medal – first place	1996 Kallang	Doubles
Silver medal – second place	1996 Kallang	Team

Kong Linghui (simplified Chinese: 孔令辉; traditional Chinese: 孔令輝; pinyin: Kǒng Lìnghuī; born October 18, 1975) is a retired Chinese table tennis player. He competed in the 1996 Summer Olympics, as well as in the 2000 Summer Olympics and the 2004 Summer Olympics.

Kong's family origin is Qufu, Shandong Province, and he is a 76th generation descendant of Confucius, as "Ling" is his generation name.

== Career ==
In 1996, Kong won the gold medal in the men's doubles competition together with Liu Guoliang. Four years later, he won the gold medal in the men's singles competition and the silver medal in the doubles event again together with Liu Guoliang. This made him the third player to achieve a career grand slam of singles championship wins in three majors (Olympics, World Cup, World Championships). He is considered by many to be the most complete player of all time.

In 2004, Kong was eliminated in the third round of the Men's Doubles Competition together with his new partner Wang Hao.

Kong's style was believed to be modeled on the top European players of the late 1980s through to the late 1990s, namely the Swedes Jan Ove Waldner and Jörgen Persson, who won the World Championships in Dortmund in 1989 and Chiba in 1991 respectively. They utilised the shakehand grip, and played consistent good all-round games characterised by playing close to mid distance from the table, equal on both backhand and forehand sides and being strong in both attack and containing - both players have excellent receive of service techniques and solid blocking games.

In China's attempt to shake the early 1990s European male dominance of the sport - where players such as Saive (Belgium), Primorac (Croatia), Gatien (France), Waldner, Persson and Appelgren (Sweden), and Rosskopf (Germany) were dominating proceedings internationally, they sent the young Kong to Sweden in an unprecedented move to learn the European style of play. He arrived back in China in 1993, and within three years, was ranked world No. 1 as of December 1995.

Kong is considered one of the all-time greats of table tennis, and after his retirement, he became the Head Coach of China's National Women's Team.

== Controversy ==
In May 2017, Kong was sued by Marina Bay Sands in Singapore for failing to repay fully a sum of S$1 million, which he borrowed from the hotel's casino in February 2015, according to High Court of the Hong Kong Special Administrative Region. The court writ said that Kong signed a credit agreement to borrow S$1 million from the operator. He had since repaid S$545,625, but failed to offset the balance in full, leaving S$454,375 unpaid. After this event, Kong responded on Weibo, that he was in Singapore with his parents, family and friends. He had sat and observed gambling, helped them collect some gambling chips and leave a relevant personal message at the hotel casino. The Chinese Table Tennis Association said Kong's coaching of the national women's table tennis team post was suspended, and ordered him to return from the World Table Tennis Championships in Germany, as it investigates the allegations.

== See also ==
- List of table tennis players
