= Kim Taek-soo =

South Korean table tennis player (born 1970)

Kim Taek-Soo
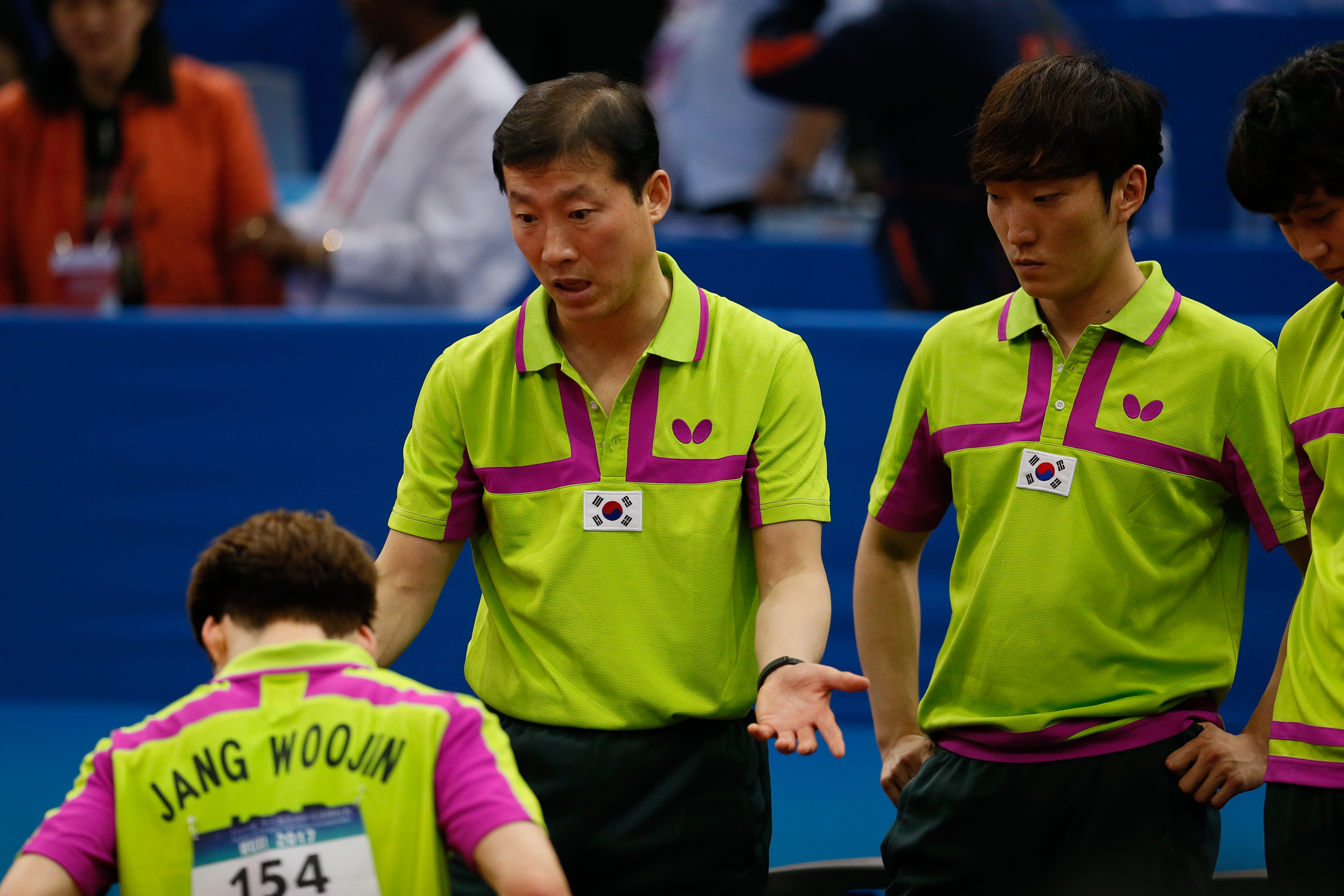
- Kim Taek-Soo

Personal information
- Full name: KIM Taek Soo
- Nationality: South Korea
- Born: 25 May 1970 (age 56)

Sport
- Sport: Table tennis
Medal record
Men's table tennis
Representing South Korea
Olympic Games
Bronze medal – third place	1992 Barcelona	Singles
Bronze medal – third place	1992 Barcelona	Doubles
World Championships
Bronze medal – third place	1991 Chiba City	Singles
Bronze medal – third place	1993 Gothenburg	Doubles
Bronze medal – third place	1995 Tianjin	Team
Bronze medal – third place	1997 Manchester	Team
Bronze medal – third place	1999 Eindhoven	Doubles
Bronze medal – third place	2001 Osaka	Doubles
Bronze medal – third place	2001 Osaka	Team
Bronze medal – third place	2003 Paris	Doubles
Bronze medal – third place	2004 Doha	Team
World Cup
Gold medal – first place	1990 Seoul	Doubles
Gold medal – first place	1992 Las Vegas	Doubles
Gold medal – first place	1995 Atlanta	Team
Silver medal – second place	1992 Ho Chi Minh City	Singles
Silver medal – second place	1998 Shantou	Singles
Silver medal – second place	2000 Yangzhou	Singles
Asian Championships
Gold medal – first place	1996 Kallang	Team
Silver medal – second place	1990 Kuala Lumpur	Mixed Doubles
Silver medal – second place	1996 Kallang	Doubles
Silver medal – second place	1998 Osaka	Team
Silver medal – second place	2000 Doha	Singles
Silver medal – second place	2000 Doha	Mixed Doubles
Bronze medal – third place	1990 Kuala Lumpur	Singles
Bronze medal – third place	1996 Kallang	Singles
Bronze medal – third place	1996 Kallang	Mixed Doubles
Bronze medal – third place	1998 Osaka	Doubles

Kim Taek-Soo (Korean: 김택수; Hanja: 金擇洙, born May 25, 1970) is a former table tennis player from South Korea. He used a one-sided penhold style, compared to the newer style of reverse-backhand looping that has become the Chinese penhold standard.

In 2010, it was announced that Taek-Soo would succeed Yoo Nam-Kyu as head coach of South Korea's national table tennis team, with the date of the change unknown.

He married archer Kim Jo-sun in 2000.
