= 2004 World Team Table Tennis Championships – Men's team =

2004 men's team (Swaythling Cup)

The 2004 World Table Tennis Championships – men's team (Swaythling Cup) was the 47th edition of the men's team championship.

China won the gold medal defeating Germany 3–0 in the final. South Korea won the bronze medal. The International Table Tennis Association introduced a new format for the second stage of the tournament.

== Medalists ==
| Event | Gold | Silver | Bronze |
|---|---|---|---|
| | China; Wang Liqin; Ma Lin; Wang Hao; Kong Linghui; Liu Guozheng | Germany; Timo Boll; Zoltan Fejer-Konnerth; Jörg Roßkopf; Torben Wosik; Christian Süß | South Korea; Joo Se-Hyuk; Kim Jung Hoon; Kim Taek-Soo; Oh Sang-Eun; Ryu Seung-Min |

== First stage ==
=== Group A ===
| Pos | Team |
|---|---|
| 1 | China |
| 2 | South Korea |
| 3 | Austria |
| 4 | Italy |
| 5 | France |
| 6 | Japan |

=== Group B ===
| Pos | Team |
|---|---|
| 1 | Germany |
| 2 | Sweden |
| 3 | Hong Kong |
| 4 | Chinese Taipei |
| 5 | Belgium |
| 6 | Russia |

== Final stage ==
=== Final ===
7 March 2004; 16:00 | Report (PDF) | China | 3–0 | Germany | Qatar International Exhibition Center, Doha
Score by game:
Wang Hao | 3–0 | Timo Boll
Ma Lin | 3–1 | Christian Süß
Wang Liqin | 3–1 | Zoltan Fejer-Konnerth

=== Final 4 bracket ===
First Round
A1 | China | 3
B1 | Germany | 0
A2 | South Korea | 3
B2 | Sweden | 1

Final Eliminator
B1 | Germany | 3
A2 | South Korea | 1

Final
A1 | China | 3
B1 | Germany | 0

== See also ==
- List of World Table Tennis Championships medalists
