= 2011 World Table Tennis Championships – Men's singles =

Men's singles at the 2011 World Table Tennis Championships
- Venue: Rotterdam Ahoy
- Location: Rotterdam, Netherlands
- Dates: 10–15 May
- Final score: 12–10, 11–7, 6–11, 9–11, 11–5, 14–12

Medalists
gold medal	Zhang Jike	China
silver medal	Wang Hao	China
bronze medal	Timo Boll	Germany
bronze medal	Ma Long	China

Wang Hao won the title in 2009 and was therefore the defending champion. He reached the final where he met fellow Chinese player Zhang Jike.

Zhang won against Hao 12–10, 11–7, 6–11, 9–11, 11–5, 14–12. This was the first time Zhang appeared in the Men's singles event at the World Championships and thus his first medal in this category.

== Seeds ==
Based on the ITTF world ranking issued before the Championships, top 64 seeds directly enter first rounds of 128-player sized draw.

1. (China) Wang Hao (final)
2. (Germany) Timo Boll (semifinals)
3. (China) Zhang Jike (World Champion)
4. (China) Ma Lin (quarterfinals)
5. (China) Ma Long (semifinals)
6. (China) Xu Xin (fourth round)
7. (Japan) Jun Mizutani (quarterfinals)
8. (Belarus) Vladimir Samsonov (fourth round)
9. (China) Wang Liqin (quarterfinals)
10. (South Korea) Joo Se-Hyuk (fourth round)
11. (South Korea) Oh Sang-Eun (fourth round)
12. (China) Chen Qi (quarterfinals)
13. (South Korea) Ryu Seung-Min (fourth round)
14. (Chinese Taipei) Chuang Chih-yuan (second round)
15. (Germany) Dimitrij Ovtcharov (fourth round)
16. (Singapore) Gao Ning (third round)
17. (Hong Kong) Tang Peng (third round)
18. (South Korea) Lee Jung-Woo (second round)
19. (Germany) Patrick Baum (third round)
20. (Germany) Bastian Steger (fourth round)
21. (Russia) Alexey Smirnov (third round)
22. (Germany) Christian Süß (first round)
23. (Sweden) Jörgen Persson (second round)
24. (Austria) Chen Weixing (second round)
25. (Hong Kong) Jiang Tianyi (third round)
26. (Romania) Adrian Crişan (second round)
27. (France) Adrien Mattenet (fourth round)
28. (Japan) Kenta Matsudaira (first round)
29. (Japan) Seiya Kishikawa (third round)
30. (South Korea) Kim Min-Seok (third round)
31. (Portugal) Tiago Apolonia (first round)
32. (Hong Kong) Li Ching (first round)
33. (Sweden) Pär Gerell (second round)
34. (Croatia) Zoran Primorac (second round)
35. (Belgium) Jean-Michel Saive (second round)
36. (South Korea) Seo Hyun-Deok (second round)
37. (Singapore) Yang Zi (second round)
38. (Slovenia) Bojan Tokič (second round)
39. (Russia) Kirill Skachkov (second round)
40. (Russia) Fedor Kuzmin (first round)
41. (Portugal) Marcos Freitas (first round)
42. (Czech Republic) Dmitrij Prokopcov (second round)
43. (Sweden) Jens Lundqvist (first round)
44. (Croatia) Andrej Gacina (second round)
45. (India) Achanta Sharath Kamal (first round)
46. (Greece) Panagiotis Gionis (third round)
47. (South Korea) Cho Eon-Rai (third round)
48. (Hong Kong) Cheung Yuk (second round)
49. (France) Christophe Legout (first round)
50. (Russia) Alexander Shibaev (third round)
51. (Hong Kong) Ko Lai Chak (third round)
52. (Spain) He Zhi Wen (second round)
53. (Czech Republic) Petr Korbel (first round)
54. (Belarus) Evgueni Chtchetinine (second round)
55. (Japan) Kazuhiro Chan (third round)
56. (Austria) Robert Gardos (second round)
57. (Spain) Carlos Machado (second round)
58. (France) Emmanuel Lebesson (first round)
59. (France) Damien Eloi (first round)
60. (Russia) Igor Rubtsov (third round)
61. (Germany) Zoltan Fejer-Konnerth (third round)
62. (Slovakia) Thomas Keinath (second round)
63. (Japan) Koki Niwa (second round)
64. (Poland) Lucjan Błaszczyk (first round)

== Draw ==
=== Key ===
- Q = Qualifier
- w/o = Walkover
- w/d = Withdraw
- r = Retired
- DQ = Disqualified

=== Finals ===
Quarterfinals
1	(China) Wang Hao	11	11	11	11
7	(Japan) Jun Mizutani	5	7	5	6
5	(China) Ma Long	11	11	11	4	11
4	(China) Ma Lin	5	9	4	11	7
3	(China) Zhang Jike	11	7	8	11	11	11
9	(China) Wang Liqin	9	11	11	9	6	7
12	(China) Chen Qi	5	11	6	7	3
2	(Germany) Timo Boll	11	5	11	11	11

Semifinals
1	(China) Wang Hao	11	9	7	12	11	11
5	(China) Ma Long	7	11	11	10	7	9
3	(China) Zhang Jike	7	11	11	11	11
2	(Germany) Timo Boll	11	5	3	3	9

Final
1	(China) Wang Hao	10	7	11	11	5	12
3	(China) Zhang Jike	12	11	6	9	11	14

=== Top half ===
==== Section 1 ====
First Round
1	(China) Wang H	5	11	11	11	11
(Dominican Republic) J Lin	11	5	3	8	8
Q	(Vietnam) Doan K Q	2	3	4	7
44	(Croatia) A Gacina	11	11	11	11
39	(Russia) K Skachkov	11	7	11	11	10	11
Q	(Belgium) Y Vostes	7	11	7	4	12	5
Q	(Guatemala) J Ramirez	4	3	6	3
30	(South Korea) Kim M-S	11	11	11	11
31	(Portugal) T Apolonia	8	11	11	9	11	9	8
(Denmark) A Bentsen	11	3	4	11	7	11	11
Q	(Chinese Taipei) Hung T-H	5	8	5	7
60	(Russia) I Rubtsov	11	11	11	11
48	(Hong Kong) Cheung Y	11	9	11	6	13	3	16
(Chinese Taipei) Huang S-S	6	11	4	11	11	11	14
(Latvia) M Burgis	9	3	5	4
13	(South Korea) Ryu S-M	11	11	11	11

Second Round
1	(China) Wang H	11	11	8	11	11
44	(Croatia) A Gacina	6	7	11	7	6
39	(Russia) K Skachkov	11	11	6	7	5	12	2
30	(South Korea) Kim M-S	7	8	11	11	11	10	11
(Denmark) A Bentsen	9	11	8	7	6
60	(Russia) I Rubtsov	11	8	11	11	11
48	(Hong Kong) Cheung Y	7	11	4	11	17	9
13	(South Korea) Ryu S-M	11	9	11	7	19	11

Third Round
1	(China) Wang H	11	12	11	5	11
30	(South Korea) Kim M-S	7	10	7	11	5
60	(Russia) I Rubtsov	11	5	7	11	7	11	5
13	(South Korea) Ryu S-M	8	11	11	6	11	7	11

Fourth Round
1	(China) Wang H	10	11	11	8	7	11	11
13	(South Korea) Ryu S-M	12	6	8	11	11	3	6

==== Section 2 ====
First Round
16	(Singapore) Gao N	14	11	5	12	11
(Portugal) J Monteiro	12	4	11	10	6
(Chinese Taipei) Chen C-A	8	11	11	11	11
45	(India) Achanta S K	11	9	8	7	9
52	(Spain) Z W He	11	7	3	11	11	11
(Poland) J Kosowski	9	11	11	9	7	8
Q	(Australia) W Henzell	10	11	11	10	8	11	9
27	(France) A Mattenet	12	5	9	12	11	2	11
26	(Romania) A Crişan	12	11	8	11	14	12	13
Q	(Croatia) R Tosic	10	9	11	8	16	14	11
Q	(Sweden) M Karlsson	12	9	11	9	7
61	(Germany) Z Fejer-Konnerth	14	11	8	11	11
64	(Poland) L Błaszczyk	11	8	6	7	11	2
(Argentina) S Liu	6	11	11	11	9	11
Q	(Slovenia) S Lasan	5	4	6	12	4
7	(Japan) J Mizutani	11	11	11	10	11

Second Round
16	(Singapore) Gao N	8	8	13	11	11	11
(Chinese Taipei) Chen C-A	11	11	11	8	5	7
52	(Spain) Z W He	9	6	11	9
27	(France) A Mattenet	11	11	13	11
26	(Romania) A Crişan	5	9	11	11	11	10
61	(Germany) Z Fejer-Konnerth	11	11	13	3	6	12
(Argentina) S Liu	20	11	7	5	8	9
7	(Japan) J Mizutani	18	5	11	11	11	11

Third Round
16	(Singapore) Gao N	7	11	9	14	6
27	(France) A Mattenet	11	3	11	16	11
61	(Germany) Z Fejer-Konnerth	5	4	8	11	12	7
7	(Japan) J Mizutani	11	11	11	6	10	11

Fourth Round
27	(France) A Mattenet	8	11	6	7	14
7	(Japan) J Mizutani	11	4	11	11	16

==== Section 3 ====
First Round
5	(China) Ma Long	11	11	11	11
Q	(Croatia) T Kolarek	2	5	6	5
Q	(Belarus) V Nekhvedovich	11	7	10	4	4
38	(Slovenia) B Tokič	9	11	12	11	11
40	(Russia) F Kuzmin	9	5	10	11	9
Q	(Czech Republic) P Sirucek	11	11	12	6	11
(Ukraine) O Didukh	6	5	12	9	7
17	(Hong Kong) Tang P	11	11	10	11	11
18	(South Korea) Lee J-W	11	11	11	11
Q	(Brazil) H Hoyama	5	7	7	7
Q	(Hungary) D Kosiba	5	11	12	7	11	11	3
55	(Japan) K Chan	11	6	10	11	9	13	11
35	(Belgium) J-M Saive	7	12	11	11	6	11
Q	(Scotland) G Rumgay	11	10	9	8	11	7
Q	(France) Q Robinot	5	13	8	10
11	(South Korea) Oh S-E	11	15	11	12

Second Round
5	(China) Ma Long	11	11	7	11	11	11
38	(Slovenia) B Tokič	13	5	11	7	9	8
Q	(Czech Republic) P Sirucek	5	10	8	11	9
17	(Hong Kong) Tang P	11	12	11	5	11
18	(South Korea) Lee J-W	2	12	11	9	11	7
55	(Japan) K Chan	11	14	9	11	7	11
35	(Belgium) J-M Saive	9	10	11	5	3
11	(South Korea) Oh S-E	11	12	9	11	11

Third Round
5	(China) Ma Long	11	11	11	11
17	(Hong Kong) Tang P	6	5	5	6
55	(Japan) K Chan	7	8	4	1
11	(South Korea) Oh S-E	11	11	11	11

Fourth Round
5	(China) Ma Long	11	11	11	11
11	(South Korea) Oh S-E	2	2	5	7

==== Section 4 ====
First Round
14	(Chinese Taipei) Chuang C-Y	11	11	11	11
(Egypt) E-S Lashin	1	9	7	5
(Hong Kong) Leung C Y	7	11	8	11	11	11
49	(France) C Legout	11	9	11	9	7	9
36	(South Korea) Seo H-D	11	11	3	11	11
Q	(Romania) O Ionescu	8	5	11	4	9
Q	(North Korea) Kim N-C	8	3	6	10
20	(Germany) B Steger	11	11	11	12
23	(Sweden) J Persson	3	13	11	12	4	11
(Chinese Taipei) Wu C-C	11	11	2	10	11	3
Q	(Serbia) M Jevtović	9	4	5	10
46	(Greece) P Gionis	11	11	11	12
63	(Japan) K Niwa	8	12	10	11	11	11
Q	(England) L Pitchford	11	10	12	3	6	8
Q	(Romania) A Filimon	6	9	3	10
4	(China) Ma Lin	11	11	11	12

Second Round
14	(Chinese Taipei) Chuang C-Y	9	11	11	11	8	9	5
(Hong Kong) Leung C Y	11	9	8	9	11	11	11
36	(South Korea) Seo H-D	9	11	7	9	7
20	(Germany) B Steger	11	8	11	11	11
23	(Sweden) J Persson	11	9	6	9	11	7
46	(Greece) P Gionis	7	11	11	11	7	11
63	(Japan) K Niwa	11	8	11	7	7
4	(China) Ma Lin	9	11	13	11	11

Third Round
(Hong Kong) Leung C Y	4	11	11	9	10	11	4
20	(Germany) B Steger	11	5	9	11	12	9	11
46	(Greece) P Gionis	1	7	8	8
4	(China) Ma Lin	11	11	11	11

Fourth Round
20	(Germany) B Steger	7	7	7	3
4	(China) Ma Lin	11	11	11	11

=== Bottom half ===
==== Section 5 ====
First Round
3	(China) Zhang J	11	11	12	11
(Turkey) B Vang	2	4	10	6
(North Korea) Ri C-G	11	11	14	11
59	(France) D Eloi	9	4	12	4
47	(South Korea) Cho E-R	11	11	11	9	11
(Italy) M Bobocica	9	9	9	11	9
(North Korea) Jang S-M	11	12	8	11	11	7	11
22	(Germany) C Süß	7	14	11	6	3	11	8
19	(Germany) P Baum	14	9	11	12	16
Q	(Ukraine) Y Pryshchepa	12	11	5	10	14
Q	(Iran) N Alamian	14	9	9	6
34	(Croatia) Z Primorac	16	11	11	11
62	(Slovakia) T Keinath	11	11	13	11
Q	(Austria) X Feng	4	4	11	8
(Serbia) A Karakašević	11	13	8	11	5	4	6
10	(South Korea) Joo S-H	8	11	11	5	11	11	11

Second Round
3	(China) Zhang J	11	10	12	11	12
(North Korea) Ri C-G	3	12	10	7	10
47	(South Korea) Cho E-R	11	11	5	13	5	9	11
(North Korea) Jang S-M	5	4	11	11	11	11	5
19	(Germany) P Baum	11	4	12	11	11
34	(Croatia) Z Primorac	5	11	10	9	9
62	(Slovakia) T Keinath	6	7	11	4	11	12
10	(South Korea) Joo S-H	11	11	4	11	7	14

Third Round
3	(China) Zhang J	11	9	11	12	11
47	(South Korea) Cho E-R	4	11	8	10	8
19	(Germany) P Baum	10	1	11	11	9	5
10	(South Korea) Joo S-H	12	11	5	8	11	11

Fourth Round
3	(China) Zhang J	11	11	13	14
10	(South Korea) Joo S-H	9	1	11	12

==== Section 6 ====
First Round
9	(China) Wang L	11	11	13	11	11
(Slovakia) L Pistej	2	1	15	9	6
(Germany) R Filus	13	11	11	11	11
53	(Czech Republic) P Korbel	11	13	9	8	4
51	(Hong Kong) Ko L C	11	11	12	13
(Czech Republic) J Simoncik	8	6	10	11
Q	(Italy) N Stoyanov	11	11	11	1	8	14
32	(Hong Kong) Li C	8	8	8	11	11	12
25	(Hong Kong) Jiang T	11	10	11	11	11
Q	(Serbia) Ž Pete	9	12	8	4	6
Q	(Romania) A Dodean	5	8	7	5
33	(Sweden) P Gerell	11	11	11	11
43	(Sweden) J Lundqvist	13	8	7	11	11	13	11
(Brazil) G Tsuboi	11	11	11	6	9	15	13
(Czech Republic) T Konecny	6	4	6	3
6	(China) Xu X	11	11	11	11

Second Round
9	(China) Wang L	16	11	14	11
(Germany) R Filus	14	6	12	5
51	(Hong Kong) Ko L C	5	11	11	11	11
Q	(Italy) N Stoyanov	11	9	6	5	7
25	(Hong Kong) Jiang T	11	11	7	8	11	3	11
33	(Sweden) P Gerell	8	8	11	11	8	11	4
(Brazil) G Tsuboi	4	5	6	3
6	(China) Xu X	11	11	11	11

Third Round
9	(China) Wang L	11	11	11	11
51	(Hong Kong) Ko L C	8	9	2	4
25	(Hong Kong) Jiang T	7	10	6	5
6	(China) Xu X	11	12	11	11

Fourth Round
9	(China) Wang L	11	7	11	12	11
6	(China) Xu X	7	11	8	10	6

==== Section 7 ====
First Round
8	(Belarus) V Samsonov	11	11	11	11
(England) P Drinkhall	7	6	8	5
Q	(Spain) A Carneros	6	9	9	4
56	(Austria) R Gardos	11	11	11	11
50	(Russia) A Shibaev	11	11	11	11
(Poland) Z Y Wang	7	9	7	7
Q	(Mexico) M Madrid	5	7	5	13	6
24	(Austria) W Chen	11	11	11	11	11
21	(Russia) A Smirnov	8	11	11	11	11
Q	(Belarus) P Platonov	11	8	2	5	4
Q	(England) A Baggaley	9	11	7	9	9
57	(Spain) C Machado	11	4	11	11	11
58	(France) E Lebesson	11	6	11	8	9	11
Q	(Slovakia) M Bardon	6	11	7	11	11	13
(Austria) D Habesohn	9	5	8	4
12	(China) Chen Q	11	11	11	11

Second Round
8	(Belarus) V Samsonov	11	11	11	11
56	(Austria) R Gardos	3	7	8	7
50	(Russia) A Shibaev	11	9	11	11	11
24	(Austria) W Chen	6	11	8	6	8
21	(Russia) A Smirnov	11	13	11	9	10	11
57	(Spain) C Machado	9	11	7	11	12	4
Q	(Slovakia) M Bardon	8	4	9	3
12	(China) Chen Q	11	11	11	11

Third Round
8	(Belarus) V Samsonov	11	11	6	11	11
50	(Russia) A Shibaev	5	8	11	5	7
21	(Russia) A Smirnov	8	5	5	5
12	(China) Chen Q	11	11	11	11

Fourth Round
8	(Belarus) V Samsonov	11	6	6	14	6	11	9
12	(China) Chen Q	6	11	11	12	11	6	11

==== Section 8 ====
First Round
15	(Germany) D Ovtcharov	11	11	11	11
Q	(Norway) E Ronneberg	8	4	5	7
(Austria) S Fegerl	11	10	11	4	11	11
41	(Portugal) M Freitas	7	12	8	11	8	9
42	(Czech Republic) D Prokopcov	11	11	12	10	8	11
(Hungary) J Jakab	6	7	10	12	11	8
(North Korea) Kim H-B	11	11	6	3	11	8	8
29	(Japan) S Kishikawa	8	8	11	11	8	11	11
28	(Japan) Kenta Matsudaira	11	7	9	11	7	11	7
(Sweden) R Svensson	8	11	11	7	11	6	11
(Ukraine) L Kou	1	7	11	10	11	2
54	(Belarus) E Chtchetinine	11	11	9	12	8	11
37	(Singapore) Yang Z	11	11	7	7	11	11
(Ukraine) Y Zhmudenko	6	3	11	11	7	5
(Japan) Kenji Matsudaira	8	5	4	11	4
2	(Germany) T Boll	11	11	11	6	11

Second Round
15	(Germany) D Ovtcharov	19	11	11	9	11
(Austria) S Fegerl	17	5	4	11	4
42	(Czech Republic) D Prokopcov	11	6	4	4	8
29	(Japan) S Kishikawa	6	11	11	11	11
(Sweden) R Svensson	11	11	11	11
54	(Belarus) E Chtchetinine	5	4	9	5
37	(Singapore) Yang Z	7	8	3	5
2	(Germany) T Boll	11	11	11	11

Third Round
15	(Germany) D Ovtcharov	11	11	11	11
29	(Japan) S Kishikawa	3	5	3	5
(Sweden) R Svensson	9	8	8	6
2	(Germany) T Boll	11	11	11	11

Fourth Round
15	(Germany) D Ovtcharov	7	6	13	15	0	8
2	(Germany) T Boll	11	11	11	13	11	11
