= 2005 World Table Tennis Championships – Men's doubles =

Men's doubles at the 2005 World Table Tennis Championships
- Venue: Shanghai Grand Stage
- Location: Shanghai, China
- Final score: 11–9, 11–3, 11–9, 7–11, 11–6

Medalists
| gold medal | Kong Linghui; Wang Hao | China |
| silver medal | Timo Boll; Christian Süß | Germany |
| bronze medal | Chen Qi; Ma Lin | China |
| bronze medal | Wang Liqin; Yan Sen | China |

The 2005 World Table Tennis Championships men's doubles was the 48th edition of the men's doubles championship.

Wang Hao and Kong Linghui won the title after defeating Timo Boll and Christian Süß in the final by four sets to one.

== Seeds ==
1. (China) Chen Qi / (China) Ma Lin (semifinals)
2. (China) Wang Liqin / (China) Yan Sen (semifinals)
3. (China) Kong Linghui / (China) Wang Hao (champions)
4. (Hong Kong) Ko Lai Chak / (Hong Kong) Li Ching (third round)
5. (Austria) Karl Jindrak / (Austria) Werner Schlager (second round)
6. (Hong Kong) Cheung Yuk / (Hong Kong) Leung Chu Yan (quarterfinals)
7. (South Korea) Lee Jung-woo / (South Korea) Ryu Seung-min (quarterfinals)
8. (Denmark) Michael Maze / (Denmark) Finn Tugwell (third round)
9. (Germany) Timo Boll / (Germany) Christian Süß (final)
10. (Serbia and Montenegro) Slobodan Grujić / (Serbia and Montenegro) Aleksandar Karakašević (third round)
11. (Sweden) Jörgen Persson / (Sweden) Jan-Ove Waldner (second round)
12. (Chinese Taipei) Chiang Peng-lung / (Chinese Taipei) Chuang Chih-yuan (quarterfinals)
13. (Russia) Fedor Kuzmin / (Russia) Alexey Smirnov (third round)
14. (Sweden) Peter Karlsson / (Sweden) Jens Lundqvist (third round)
15. (Poland) Lucjan Błaszczyk / (Poland) Wang Zengyi (quarterfinals)
16. (France) Patrick Chila / (France) Damien Éloi (third round)

== Finals ==
Third round
1 | (China) Chen Qi (China) Ma Lin | 11 | 11 | 11 | 9 | 11
(Romania) Adrian Crișan (Romania) Vasile Florea | 5 | 7 | 5 | 11 | 5
12 | (Chinese Taipei) Chiang Peng-lung (Chinese Taipei) Chuang Chih-yuan | 8 | 11 | 11 | 7 | 11 | 7 | 11
(Netherlands) Danny Heister (Netherlands) Trinko Keen | 11 | 4 | 5 | 11 | 5 | 11 | 9
9 | (Germany) Timo Boll (Germany) Christian Süß | 11 | 11 | 14 | 6 | 6 | 11
8 | (Denmark) Michael Maze (Denmark) Finn Tugwell | 8 | 9 | 12 | 11 | 11 | 9
15 | (Poland) Lucjan Błaszczyk (Poland) Wang Zengyi | 7 | 10 | 12 | 11 | 11 | 11
4 | (Hong Kong) Ko Lai Chak (Hong Kong) Li Ching | 11 | 12 | 10 | 7 | 9 | 4
3 | (China) Kong Linghui (China) Wang Hao | 11 | 11 | 11 | 11
10 | (Serbia) Slobodan Grujić (Serbia) Aleksandar Karakašević | 6 | 3 | 6 | 9
6 | (Hong Kong) Cheung Yuk (Hong Kong) Leung Chu Yan | 11 | 11 | 11 | 11
13 | (Russia) Fedor Kuzmin (Russia) Alexey Smirnov | 8 | 6 | 8 | 8
7 | (South Korea) Lee Jung-woo (South Korea) Ryu Seung-min | 11 | 13 | 11 | 11 | 13
16 | (France) Patrick Chila (France) Damien Éloi | 8 | 15 | 5 | 6 | 11
14 | (Sweden) Peter Karlsson (Sweden) Jens Lundqvist | 8 | 4 | 4 | 8
2 | (China) Wang Liqin (China) Yan Sen | 11 | 11 | 11 | 11

Quarterfinals
1 | (China) Chen Qi (China) Ma Lin | 8 | 8 | 11 | 11 | 11 | 11
12 | (Chinese Taipei) Chiang Peng-lung (Chinese Taipei) Chuang Chih-yuan | 11 | 11 | 2 | 5 | 2 | 6
9 | (Germany) Timo Boll (Germany) Christian Süß | 11 | 9 | 11 | 11 | 12
15 | (Poland) Lucjan Błaszczyk (Poland) Wang Zengyi | 4 | 11 | 5 | 7 | 10
3 | (China) Kong Linghui (China) Wang Hao | 11 | 11 | 11 | 3 | 11
6 | (Hong Kong) Cheung Yuk (Hong Kong) Leung Chu Yan | 3 | 7 | 5 | 11 | 8
7 | (South Korea) Lee Jung-woo (South Korea) Ryu Seung-min | 13 | 4 | 12 | 3 | 5
2 | (China) Wang Liqin (China) Yan Sen | 11 | 11 | 14 | 11 | 11

Semifinals
1 | (China) Chen Qi (China) Ma Lin | 11 | 11 | 6 | 13 | 7
9 | (Germany) Timo Boll (Germany) Christian Süß | 13 | 3 | 11 | 15 | 11
3 | (China) Kong Linghui (China) Wang Hao | 13 | 11 | 2 | 7 | 11 | 12
2 | (China) Wang Liqin (China) Yan Sen | 11 | 8 | 11 | 11 | 7 | 10

Final
9 | (Germany) Timo Boll (Germany) Christian Süß | 9 | 3 | 9 | 11 | 6
3 | (China) Kong Linghui (China) Wang Hao | 11 | 11 | 11 | 7 | 11
