= ITTF Tournament of Champions =

ITTF Tournament of Champions was a table tennis tournament held in Changsha, China in 2006 to 2009 which was organized by International Table Tennis Federation and Chinese Table Tennis Association.

== Medalists ==
=== Men's singles ===
Year	Gold	Silver	Bronze
2006	(China) Wang Liqin	(China) Ma Lin	(Belarus) Vladimir Samsonov
2006	(China) Wang Liqin	(China) Ma Lin	(China) Wang Hao
2007	(China) Wang Hao	(China) Ma Lin	(Belarus) Vladimir Samsonov
2007	(China) Wang Hao	(China) Ma Lin	(China) Wang Liqin
2008	(China) Wang Hao	(China) Wang Liqin	(Germany) Timo Boll
2008	(China) Wang Hao	(China) Wang Liqin	(China) Ma Lin
2009	(China) Ma Long	(Germany) Timo Boll	(China) Ma Lin
2009	(China) Ma Long	(Germany) Timo Boll	(Germany) Dimitrij Ovtcharov

=== Women's singles ===
Year	Gold	Silver	Bronze
2006	(China) Zhang Yining	(China) Wang Nan	(China) Guo Yan
2006	(China) Zhang Yining	(China) Wang Nan	(Singapore) Li Jiawei
2007	(China) Wang Nan	(China) Li Xiaoxia	(China) Guo Yue
2007	(China) Wang Nan	(China) Li Xiaoxia	(Singapore) Wang Yuegu
2008	(China) Zhang Yining	(China) Li Xiaoxia	(China) Guo Yue
2008	(China) Zhang Yining	(China) Li Xiaoxia	(Singapore) Li Jiawei
2009	(China) Guo Yan	(China) Liu Shiwen	(Belarus) Viktoria Pavlovich
2009	(China) Guo Yan	(China) Liu Shiwen	(Germany) Wu Jiaduo
