= China vs. World Challenge =

International table tennis competition

The China vs. World Challenge was an international table tennis competition organised by the Chinese Table Tennis Association (CTTA), the International Table Tennis Federation (ITTF) and Volkswagen.

Each "China vs. World Challenge" consist in a two-day team competition in Shanghai between a China and a World all-star teams.

== Results ==
=== Men's team ===
Date	Host city	Line-up		Results
Date	Host city	World	China	Results
9 June 2009	Shanghai	(South Korea) Joo Se-Hyuk (Belarus) Vladimir Samsonov (Japan) Kenta Matsudaira	(China) Ma Long (China) Xu Xin (China) Wang Liqin	China beats all stars 4-1
30 June 2010	Shanghai	(Germany) Timo Boll (South Korea) Joo Se-Hyuk (Japan) Jun Mizutani	(China) Xu Xin (China) Wang Hao (China) Wang Liqin (China) Zhang Jike	China beats all stars 5-0
25 June 2011	Shanghai	(Japan) Jun Mizutani (Germany) Timo Boll (South Korea) Joo Se-Hyuk	(China) Ma Long (China) Xu Xin (China) Ma Lin	China beats all stars 4-1
24-25 November 2012	Shanghai	(Germany) Timo Boll (Denmark) Michael Maze (Germany) Dimitrij Ovtcharov	(China) Ma Lin (China) Xu Xin (China) Wang Liqin	China beats all stars 4-0

=== Women's team ===
Date	Host city	Line-up		Results
Date	Host city	World	China	Results
8 June 2009	Shanghai	(South Korea) Kim Kyung-Ah (Singapore) Feng Tianwei (Romania) Daniela Dodean	(China) Liu Shiwen (China) Ding Ning (China) Li Xiaoxia	China beats World 4-1
29 June 2010	Shanghai	(Singapore) Feng Tianwei (Japan) Ai Fukuhara (South Korea) Kim Kyung-Ah (Romania) Daniela Dodean	(China) Guo Yan (China) Li Xiaoxia (China) Liu Shiwen (China) Ding Ning	China beats World 5-0
24 June 2011	Shanghai	(South Korea) Kim Kyung-Ah (Singapore) Feng Tianwei (Hong Kong) Tie Ya Na	(China) Guo Yan (China) Feng Yalan (China) Zhu Yuling	World beats China 3-2
24-25 November 2012	Shanghai	(South Korea) Kim Kyung-Ah (Romania) Elizabeta Samara (Singapore) Feng Tianwei	(China) Ding Ning (China) Chen Meng (China) Zhu Yuling	China beats World 4-0
