= Ovtcharov =

Ovtcharov, also transliterated Ovcharov (Russian: Овчаро́в), female form Ov(t)charova (Russian: Овчаро́ва), is a Russian, Ukrainian and Bulgarian surname.

Notable people with this surname include:

- Anna Ovcharova (born 1996), Russian figure skater
- Dimitrij Ovtcharov (born 1988), Ukrainian-born German table tennis player
- Emil Ovtcharov (born 1973), Bulgarian footballer
- Jenny Ovtcharov (born 1988), Swedish table tennis player
- Lyubov Ovcharova (born 1995), Russian freestyle wrestler
- Nikolay Ovcharov (born 1957), Bulgarian archaeologist
- Peter Ovtcharov (born 1981), Russian pianist
- Rumen Ovtcharov (born 1952), Bulgarian engineer and politician
- Yuriy Ovcharov (born 1966), Soviet footballer and Ukrainian coach
