= 2003 World Table Tennis Championships – Men's singles =

The 2003 World Table Tennis Championships men's singles was the 47th edition of the men's singles championship.

Werner Schlager defeated Joo Sae-hyuk in the final, winning four sets to two to secure the title.

== Finals ==
Fourth round
(China) Qiu Yike | 11 | 11 | 9 | 11 | 9 | 11
(Romania) Adrian Crișan | 6 | 8 | 11 | 6 | 11 | 8
(South Korea) Oh Sang-eun | 8 | 11 | 11 | 7 | 10 | 6
(China) Kong Linghui | 11 | 6 | 8 | 11 | 12 | 11
(Austria) Werner Schlager | 5 | 11 | 13 | 12 | 10 | 11
(South Korea) Kim Taek-soo | 11 | 3 | 11 | 10 | 12 | 8
(Chinese Taipei) Chiang Peng-lung | 6 | 11 | 1 | 10 | 11 | 6
(China) Wang Liqin | 11 | 4 | 11 | 12 | 6 | 11
(Greece) Kalinikos Kreanga | 8 | 11 | 11 | 13 | 11 | 7 | 11
(Belarus) Vladimir Samsonov | 11 | 6 | 1 | 15 | 9 | 11 | 5
(Austria) Chen Weixing | 5 | 11 | 12 | 11 | 9 | 11 | 11
(China) Wang Hao | 11 | 9 | 10 | 13 | 11 | 4 | 9
(Chinese Taipei) Chuang Chih-yuan | 5 | 11 | 2 | 9 | 6
(South Korea) Joo Sae-hyuk | 11 | 6 | 11 | 11 | 11
(Sweden) Fredrik Håkansson | 12 | 5 | 11 | 4 | 1 | 3
(China) Ma Lin | 10 | 11 | 9 | 11 | 11 | 11

Quarterfinals
(China) Qiu Yike | 1 | 9 | 11 | 1 | 8
(China) Kong Linghui | 11 | 11 | 4 | 11 | 11
(Austria) Schlager | 5 | 11 | 8 | 13 | 11 | 13 | 11
(China) Wang Liqin | 11 | 5 | 11 | 15 | 9 | 11 | 5
(Greece) Kreanga | 12 | 11 | 11 | 11
(Austria) Chen Weixing | 10 | 9 | 8 | 7
(South Korea) Joo Sae-hyuk | 13 | 10 | 8 | 11 | 6 | 11 | 11
(China) Ma Lin | 11 | 12 | 11 | 9 | 11 | 8 | 9

Semifinals
(China) Kong Linghui | 9 | 11 | 10 | 8 | 11 | 11 | 12
(Austria) Schlager | 11 | 7 | 12 | 11 | 8 | 7 | 14
(Greece) Kreanga | 5 | 11 | 7 | 8 | 10
(South Korea) Joo Sae-hyuk | 11 | 3 | 11 | 11 | 12

Final
(Austria) Schlager | 11 | 11 | 6 | 12 | 8 | 12
(South Korea) Joo Sae-hyuk | 9 | 6 | 11 | 10 | 11 | 10
