= 2004 World Team Table Tennis Championships =

2004 edition of the World Team Table Tennis Championships

- Venue: Qatar International Exhibition Center
- Location: Doha, Qatar
- Dates: 1 March–7 March

Champions
- Men: China
- Women: China

The 2004 World Team Table Tennis Championships was held at the Qatar International Exhibition Center in Doha, Qatar from March 1 to March 7, 2004. This decision was announced in May 2001. It is the 47th edition to be contested.

== Medal summary ==
=== Medal table ===
Rank	Nation	Gold	Silver	Bronze	Total
1	China (CHN)	2	0	0	2
2	Germany (GER)	0	1	0	1
2	Hong Kong (HKG)	0	1	0	1
4	Japan (JPN)	0	0	1	1
4	South Korea (KOR)	0	0	1	1
Totals (5 entries)		2	2	2	6

=== Events ===
Event	Gold	Silver	Bronze
Men's team (Swaythling Cup)	China; Wang Liqin; Ma Lin; Wang Hao; Kong Linghui; Liu Guozheng	Germany; Timo Boll; Zoltan Fejer-Konnerth; Jörg Roßkopf; Torben Wosik; Christian Süß	South Korea; Joo Se-Hyuk; Kim Jung Hoon; Kim Taek-Soo; Oh Sang-Eun; Ryu Seung-Min
Women's team (Corbillon Cup)	China; Zhang Yining; Guo Yue; Wang Nan; Niu Jianfeng; Li Ju	Hong Kong; Lau Sui-fei; Song Ah Sim; Zhang Rui; Tie Ya Na; Yu Kwok See	Japan; Ai Fujinuma; Ai Fukuhara; Sayaka Hirano; Naoko Taniguchi; Aya Umemura
