= Torben Wosik =

German table tennis player

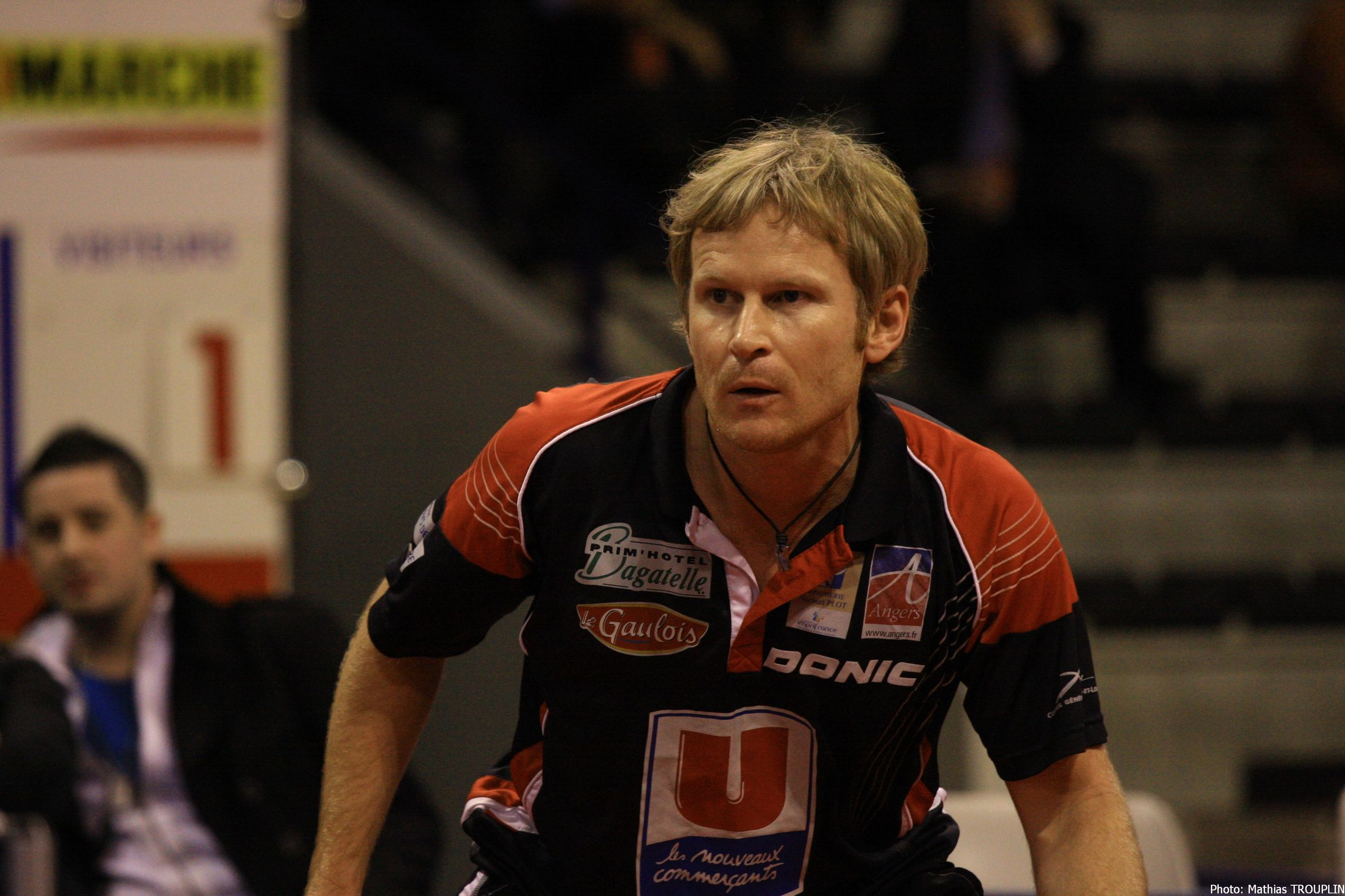

Personal information
- Nationality: Germany
- Born: 8 October 1973 (age 52) Hamm, West Germany
Medal record
Representing Germany
World Table Tennis Championships
Silver medal – second place	2004	Men's Team

Torben Wosik is a male former international table tennis player from Germany.

He won a silver medal at the 2004 World Team Table Tennis Championships in the Swaythling Cup (men's team event) with Timo Boll, Zoltan Fejer-Konnerth, Jörg Roßkopf, and Christian Süß for Germany.

He also won four European Table Tennis Championships medals from 2000 until 2003.

== See also ==
- List of table tennis players
- List of World Table Tennis Championships medalists
