= Kim Jung-hoon (table tennis) =

South Korean table tennis player

Kim Jung-Hoon
Personal information
- Nationality: South Korea
- Born: 21 August 1982 (age 43)
Medal record
Representing South Korea
World Table Tennis Championships
| Bronze medal – third place | 2004 | Men's Team |
| Silver medal – second place | 2008 | Men's Team |

Kim Jung-Hoon is a male former international table tennis player from South Korea.

He won a bronze medal at the 2004 World Team Table Tennis Championships in the Swaythling Cup (men's team event) with Joo Se-Hyuk, Kim Taek-Soo, Oh Sang-Eun and Ryu Seung-Min for South Korea.

Four years later he won a silver medal at the 2008 World Team Table Tennis Championships in the Swaythling Cup (men's team event) with Joo Se-Hyuk, Ryu Seung-Min, Lee Jung-Woo and Lee Jin-Kwon.

== See also ==
- List of table tennis players
- List of World Table Tennis Championships medalists
