= 2017 ITTF Men's World Cup =

Table tennis tournament

- Venue: Country Hall Liège
- Location: Liège, Belgium
- Date: 20–22 October
- Competitors: 20 from 15 nations
- Total prize money: $150,000

Medalists
gold medal	(Germany) Dimitrij Ovtcharov
silver medal	(Germany) Timo Boll
bronze medal	(China) Ma Long

The 2017 ITTF Men's World Cup was a table tennis competition held in Liège, Belgium, from 20 to 22 October 2017. It was the 38th edition of the ITTF-sanctioned event, and the fourth time that it had been staged in Belgium.

In the final, Germany's Dimitrij Ovtcharov defeated fellow German Timo Boll, 4–2, to win his first World Cup title.

== Qualification ==
The following list of players was confirmed on 25 September 2017, based on the qualification system set by the ITTF.

No.	World Ranking (August 2017)	Player	Qualified as
1	1	(China) Ma Long	World Champion
2	31	(Nigeria) Quadri Aruna	Africa Cup winner
3	32	(China) Lin Gaoyuan	Asian Cup winner
4	104	(Brazil) Gustavo Tsuboi	PanAm Cup winner
5	212	(United States) Kanak Jha	PanAm Cup North American qualifier
6	293	(Australia) David Powell	Oceania Cup winner
7	4	(Germany) Dimitrij Ovtcharov	Europe Top 16 winner
8	12	(South Korea) Lee Sang-su	Asian Cup 2nd place
9	52	(Chinese Taipei) Chen Chien-an	Asian Cup 3rd place
10	35	(Russia) Alexander Shibaev	Europe Top 16 2nd place
11	13	(France) Simon Gauzy	Europe Top 16 3rd place
12	6	(Japan) Jun Mizutani	Continental Cup qualifier
13	30	(Ukraine) Kou Lei	Continental Cup qualifier
14	7	(Germany) Timo Boll	Continental Cup qualifier
15	39	(Egypt) Omar Assar	Continental Cup qualifier
16	40	(South Korea) Jeong Sang-eun	Continental Cup qualifier
17	14	(Chinese Taipei) Chuang Chih-yuan	Continental Cup qualifier
18	9	(Japan) Koki Niwa	Continental Cup qualifier
19	81	(Belgium) Cédric Nuytinck	Host nation representative
20	15	(Portugal) Marcos Freitas	Wild card

== Competition format ==
The tournament consisted of two stages: a preliminary group stage and a knockout stage. The players seeded 9 to 20 were drawn into four groups, with three players in each group. The top two players from each group then joined the top eight seeded players in the second stage of the competition, which consisted of a knockout draw.

== Seeding ==
The seeding list was based on the official ITTF world ranking for October 2017.

1. (China) Ma Long (semifinals)
2. (Germany) Dimitrij Ovtcharov (champion)
3. (Germany) Timo Boll (final)
4. (Japan) Jun Mizutani (quarterfinals)
5. (Japan) Koki Niwa (quarterfinals)
6. (China) Lin Gaoyuan (quarterfinals)
7. (France) Simon Gauzy (semifinals)
8. (Chinese Taipei) Chuang Chih-yuan (first round)
9. (South Korea) Lee Sang-su (first round)
10. (Portugal) Marcos Freitas (first round)
11. (Egypt) Omar Assar (first round)
12. (Chinese Taipei) Chen Chien-an (Preliminary round, withdrew)
13. (Ukraine) Kou Lei (first round)
14. (Nigeria) Quadri Aruna (first round)
15. (South Korea) Jeong Sang-eun (first round)
16. (Russia) Alexander Shibaev (quarterfinals)
17. (Belgium) Cédric Nuytinck (Preliminary round)
18. (Brazil) Gustavo Tsuboi (first round)
19. (United States) Kanak Jha (Preliminary round)
20. (Australia) David Powell (Preliminary round)

== Preliminary stage ==
The preliminary group stage took place on 20 October, with the top two players in each group progressing to the main draw.

Chen Chien-an withdrew from the competition on the opening day due to illness.

	Group A	(South Korea) Lee	(Nigeria) Aruna	(United States) Jha	Points
9	(South Korea) Lee Sang-su		4–3	4–3	4
14	(Nigeria) Quadri Aruna	3–4		4–2	3
19	(United States) Kanak Jha	3–4	2–4		2

	Group B	(Portugal) Freitas	(Ukraine) Kou	(Australia) Powell	Points
10	(Portugal) Marcos Freitas		4–0	4–0	4
13	(Ukraine) Kou Lei	0–4		4–0	3
20	(Australia) David Powell	0–4	0–4		2

	Group C	(Russia) Shibaev	(Egypt) Assar	(Belgium) Nuytinck	Points
16	(Russia) A. Shibaev		4–3	4–0	'4
11	(Egypt) Omar Assar	3–4		4–3	3
17	(Belgium) Cédric Nuytinck	0–4	3–4		2

	Group D	(South Korea) Jeong	(Brazil) Tsuboi	(Chinese Taipei) Chen	Points
15	(South Korea) Jeong Sang-eun		4–1	w/o	4
18	(Brazil) Gustavo Tsuboi	1–4		w/o	3
12	(Chinese Taipei) Chen Chien-an	w/d	w/d		

== Main draw ==
The knockout stage took place from 21–22 October.

First round
1	(China) Ma Long	11	7	11	11	11
11	(Egypt) Omar Assar	7	11	8	8	4
9	(South Korea) Lee Sang-su	5	10	11	11	6	9
5	(Japan) Koki Niwa	11	12	8	2	11	11
6	(China) Lin Gaoyuan	11	10	11	11	11
10	(Portugal) Marcos Freitas	3	12	9	5	5
18	(Brazil) Gustavo Tsuboi	10	8	5	11
3	(Germany) Timo Boll	12	11	11	13
4	(Japan) Jun Mizutani	11	11	11	11
14	(Nigeria) Quadri Aruna	6	7	6	7
15	(South Korea) Jeong Sang-eun	11	4	11	7	9
7	(France) Simon Gauzy	9	11	13	11	11
8	(Chinese Taipei) Chuang Chih-yuan	10	11	9	9	11	9
16	(Russia) Alexander Shibaev	12	9	11	11	5	11
13	(Ukraine) Kou Lei	4	5	11	12	6
2	(Germany) Dimitrij Ovtcharov	11	11	13	10	11

Quarterfinals
1	(China) Ma Long	13	11	11	9	11
5	(Japan) Koki Niwa	11	9	5	11	8
6	(China) Lin Gaoyuan	11	13	9	11	9	12	11
3	(Germany) Timo Boll	5	11	11	9	11	14	13
4	(Japan) Jun Mizutani	7	11	11	13	9	11	8
7	(France) Simon Gauzy	11	6	13	11	11	7	11
16	(Russia) Alexander Shibaev	11	11	10	9	7	12	7
2	(Germany) Dimitrij Ovtcharov	9	8	12	11	11	10	11

Semifinals
1	(China) Ma Long	11	11	9	11	7	5	10
3	(Germany) Timo Boll	6	9	11	9	11	11	12
7	(France) Simon Gauzy	11	2	8	12	11	4	8
2	(Germany) Dimitrij Ovtcharov	6	11	11	10	7	11	11

Final
3	(Germany) Timo Boll	12	8	7	11	7	2
2	(Germany) Dimitrij Ovtcharov	10	11	11	9	11	11
Third place
1	(China) Ma Long	11	11	6	11	11	11
7	(France) Simon Gauzy	5	13	11	5	7	9

== See also ==
- 2017 World Table Tennis Championships
- 2017 ITTF Women's World Cup
- 2017 ITTF World Tour
- 2017 ITTF World Tour Grand Finals
