= Timo Boll =

German table tennis player

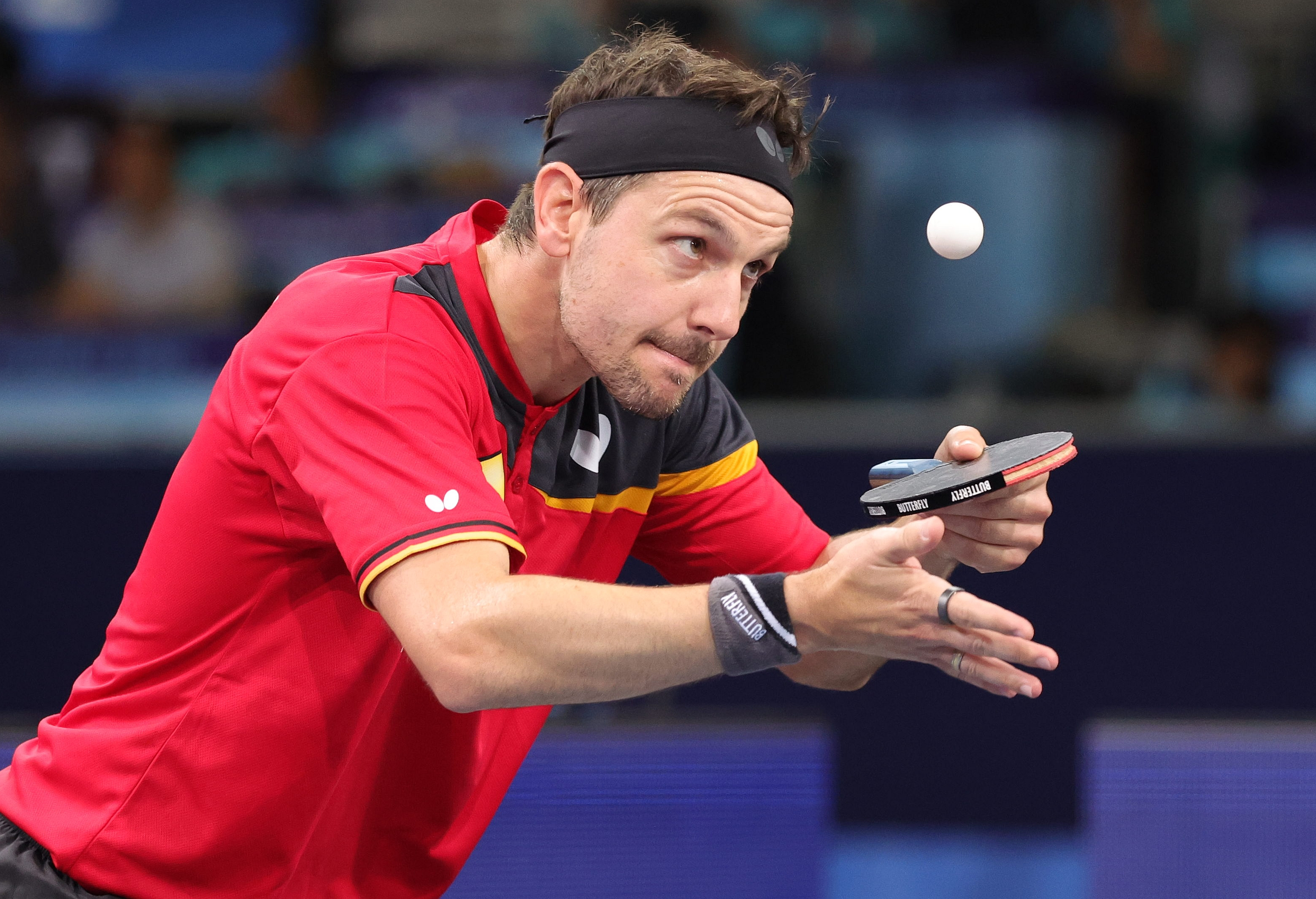
- Boll in 2022

Personal information
- Born: 8 March 1981 (age 45) Erbach, West Germany
- Height: 1.81 m (5 ft 11 in)
- Weight: 72 kg (159 lb)

Sport
- Sport: Table tennis
- Club: Borussia Düsseldorf
- Playing style: Left-handed, shakehand grip
- Equipment: Butterfly Timo Boll ALC blade; Butterfly Dignics 09c (Black, FH); Butterfly Dignics 09c (Red, BH) Early career = Donic
- Highest ranking: 1 (January 2003)
Medal record
Men's table tennis
Representing Germany
Event	1st	2nd	3rd
Olympic Games	0	2	2
World Championships	0	6	3
World Cup	2	3	2
Total	2	11	7
Olympic Games
Silver medal – second place	2008 Beijing	Team
Silver medal – second place	2020 Tokyo	Team
Bronze medal – third place	2012 London	Team
Bronze medal – third place	2016 Rio de Janeiro	Team
World Championships
Silver medal – second place	2004 Doha	Team
Silver medal – second place	2005 Shanghai	Doubles
Silver medal – second place	2010 Moscow	Team
Silver medal – second place	2012 Dortmund	Team
Silver medal – second place	2014 Tokyo	Team
Silver medal – second place	2018 Halmstad	Team
Bronze medal – third place	2006 Bremen	Team
Bronze medal – third place	2011 Rotterdam	Singles
Bronze medal – third place	2021 Houston	Singles
World Cup
Gold medal – first place	2002 Jinan	Singles
Gold medal – first place	2005 Liège	Singles
Silver medal – second place	2008 Liège	Singles
Silver medal – second place	2012 Liverpool	Singles
Silver medal – second place	2017 Liège	Singles
Silver medal – second place	2018 Paris	Singles
Bronze medal – third place	2010 Magdeburg	Singles
Bronze medal – third place	2014 Düsseldorf	Singles
European Games
Gold medal – first place	2019 Minsk	Singles
Gold medal – first place	2019 Minsk	Team
Gold medal – first place	2023 Kraków–Małopolska	Team
European Championships
Gold medal – first place	2002 Zagreb	Singles
Gold medal – first place	2002 Zagreb	Doubles
Gold medal – first place	2007 Belgrade	Singles
Gold medal – first place	2007 Belgrade	Doubles
Gold medal – first place	2007 Belgrade	Team
Gold medal – first place	2008 Saint-Petersburg	Singles
Gold medal – first place	2008 Saint-Petersburg	Doubles
Gold medal – first place	2008 Saint-Petersburg	Team
Gold medal – first place	2009 Stuttgart	Doubles
Gold medal – first place	2009 Stuttgart	Team
Gold medal – first place	2010 Ostrava	Singles
Gold medal – first place	2010 Ostrava	Doubles
Gold medal – first place	2010 Ostrava	Team
Gold medal – first place	2011 Gdansk-Sopot	Singles
Gold medal – first place	2011 Gdansk-Sopot	Team
Gold medal – first place	2012 Herning	Singles
Gold medal – first place	2017 Luxembourg	Team
Gold medal – first place	2018 Alicante	Singles
Gold medal – first place	2019 Nantes	Team
Gold medal – first place	2021 Warsaw	Singles
Silver medal – second place	2000 Bremen	Team
Silver medal – second place	2002 Zagreb	Team
Silver medal – second place	2003 Courmayeur	Team
Silver medal – second place	2014 Lisbon	Team
Silver medal – second place	2023 Malmö	Team
Bronze medal – third place	2003 Courmayeur	Singles
Bronze medal – third place	2005 Aarhus	Doubles
Bronze medal – third place	2009 Stuttgart	Singles
Bronze medal – third place	2016 Budapest	Singles

Timo Boll (German pronunciation: [ˈtiːmo ˈbɔl], audio; born 8 March 1981) is a German former professional table tennis player. Boll is the most successful German table tennis player of all time, having won several medals at Olympic Games, world cups, and world championships. He was ranked world No. 1 in 2003, 2011 and in March 2018.

== Early life ==
Boll was born in Erbach im Odenwald, Hessen. Boll started playing at age 4, and was coached at the time by his father. In 1987, he became a member of TSV Höchst. At age 8, he was discovered by Helmut Hampel, a Hessian trainer who promoted him. In 1990, he started to train at the training centre Pfungstadt and four years later changed teams to FTG Frankfurt with whom he took part in the Second Division, at which time he attracted the attention of other table tennis associations. TTV Gönnern recruited him in 1995, a move which required the entire team to relocate 170 km away, to Höchst, to enable daily training with the then 14-year-old Boll. Boll was placed in position five on the team, but lost only one match throughout the whole season. This contributed to the team's transition to the table tennis national league's Tischtennis-Bundesliga (First Division).

== Career ==
=== Junior success ===
At age 14, Boll held the title of youngest player in the national league (A title he shared with Frank Klitzsch). He celebrated his first international success during the Table Tennis European Youth Championships in The Hague in 1995, where he won three gold medals. In 1996, he was a runner up in the Junior Boys Singles of that same competition, but then went on to win the singles title in 1997 and 1998, as well the doubles title in 1998. He finished school with a secondary school level I certificate.

=== Early International success (2002–2003) ===
In 2002, Timo Boll became the first German player to win the Europe-Top-12-Tournament beating Vladimir Samsonov in the final. Boll also became the best German player, according to the ITTF Rankings, overtaking Jörg Roßkopf. During the European Table Tennis Championships in Zagreb, Boll won both the singles and the doubles with Zoltan Fejer-Konnerth. The German team featuring Boll was defeated in the final by the Swedish team with a score of 2–3. With his victory in the 2002 Table Tennis World Cup held in Jinan, China (where he beat the world champion Wang Liqin and the Olympic champion Kong Linghui), Timo Boll finished the year as the highest ranked player in the world. During the European Championship of 2003, Vladimir Samsonov led the Belarusian team to victory in the final against the German team. After his elimination during the second round of the singles competition, Boll lost his number one position in the world rankings.

=== Injury and comeback (2004–2006) ===
Back problems troubled Boll during the first half of 2004, which hindered his preparation for the 2004 Summer Olympics. Here, he was outclassed in the quarterfinal by Jan-Ove Waldner. After a period marked by public criticism, Timo Boll won tournament victories in Poland, Austria, and Germany. He also reached semi-finals of the Pro Tour in Peking, where he was edged out 3–4 by Ma Lin. Early in the 2005 season, Boll's back problems struck again; nevertheless, he won the silver medal in doubles at the World Championship, playing with Christian Süß. He was awarded the Fair Play Award from the ITTF after a referee's decision was reversed in favor of his opponent during the knockout rounds of that competition, leading to a defeat. The year ended with Boll winning the Champions League with TTV RE-BAU Gönnern, and the Table Tennis World Cup in Liège in Belgium, in which he defeated all three Chinese first-class players.

=== The switch to Borrussia Düsseldorf ===
In December 2006, Timo Boll signed a 3-year contract with Borussia Düsseldorf, the current championship record-holding team, due to his former team's financial situation and loss of key players. Boll also moved in light of the upcoming Olympic Games 2008 and the possibility to train there with his doubles partner, Christian Süß. His 3-year contract with Borussia Düsseldorf began on 1 July 2007, with stipulations allowing him to miss certain Bundesliga matches in order to focus on international tournaments. His contract was later extended until 2022.

=== Climb to World No. 1 and further success (2007–2015) ===
In 2007, he won the European Championship singles, doubles, and in the team competition. He was also active as a guest player in the Chinese Super League.

During the 2008 Summer Olympics in Beijing, he participated again with the German national team. After victories over Croatia, Canada, Singapore and Japan in preliminary rounds and the semi-final, the team lost 0–3 against the host Chinese team. As the top-ranked player in 2008, Boll successfully defended his three European Champion titles from the previous year.

At the 2012 Summer Olympics, Boll lost in the last 16 to Adrian Crisan but the German team won the bronze medal in the men's team event, losing to China in semi-finals but beating Hong Kong in the bronze medal deciding match.

Back problems led Boll to not participate in the 2008 and 2009 World Championships in China and Japan respectively. At the 2008 World Cup in Liège, he scored a semi-final victory over Ma Long but lost out in the final against Wang Hao, winning a silver medal.

At the beginning of 2011, Timo Boll was back at the top of the world rankings, having beaten Ma Lin in the Volkswagen Cup final. In April 2011, he was replaced as number 1 by Wang Hao.

At the 2011 World Table Tennis Championships in Rotterdam, Boll won his first singles medal in that competition, a bronze medal, after being beaten 4:1 by world champion, Zhang Jike. During this championship, Boll declined to compete in doubles and team matches, focussing instead on the singles competition. Playing for the German national team, Boll received silver medals at both the Team World Championships 2010 in Moscow and the 2012 championships in Dortmund, losing out both times to the Chinese team.

=== Knee injury and comeback (2015–2016) ===
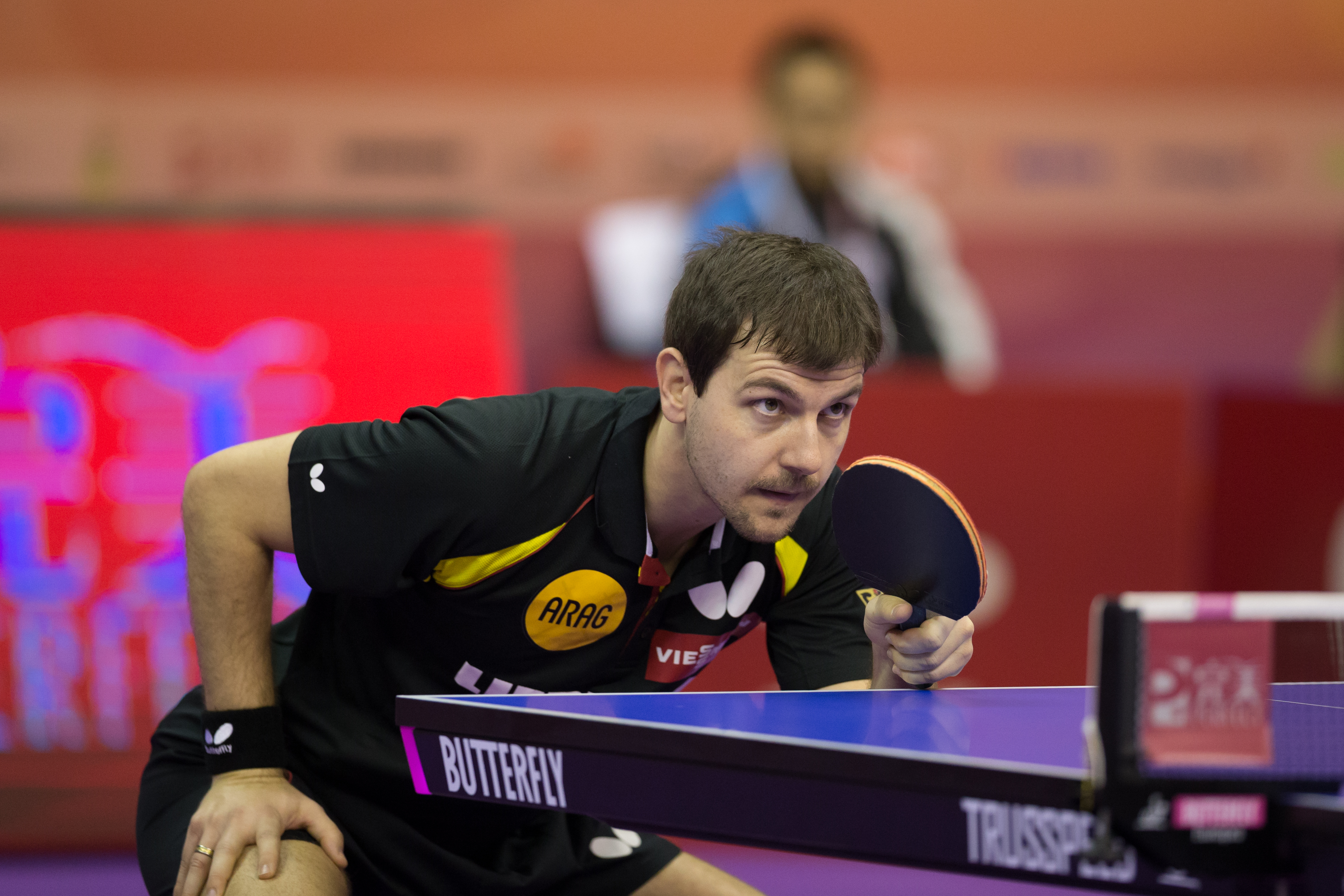
Boll in 2016

Boll kept his good form at the Chinese Super League in 2015, obtaining a result of 7 wins and 5 losses. Due to a knee injury, Boll opted for an operation to pre-empt a more serious injury. The surgery kept him out of action for an extended period of time. After resting from the surgery, Boll qualified for the 2016 Summer Olympics.

At the Olympic Singles event, Boll lost against Quadri Aruna in the round of 32. At the Team event, Boll along with partners Bastian Steger and Dimitrij Ovtcharov won the bronze medal at the team event.

=== Continued success (2017–2020) ===
Boll also won the silver medal at the 2017 World Cup, defeating Lin Gaoyuan in the quarterfinals, Ma Long in the semi-finals but losing to teammate Dimitrij Ovtcharov in the finals. He won the silver medal in the following World Cup in 2018, losing to Fan Zhendong in the finals.

Boll won another eight titles at the European Table Tennis Championships in 2009, 2010, 2011 and 2018.

=== 2021–2024 ===
In June, Boll defeated Anton Källberg in the quarter-finals of the European Table Tennis Championships. After the match, Boll said it was one of the best matches he had played in the last year or two as he felt that he was agile and thinking well. Boll then defeated Mattias Falck in the semi-finals and Dimitij Ovtcharov in the finals to clinch his record-extending eighth European Championship. After the event, Boll remarked that he was pleasantly surprised by the championship and that he was glad to be back on top after having a particularly bad last year.

In July, two weeks before the Tokyo Olympics, Timo Boll withdrew from an internal German Olympic Scrimmage due to a hip injury. Boll lost to Jeoung Youngsik in the round of 16 in the men's singles event at the Tokyo Olympics. Boll helped lead Germany to the men's team finals, and played a critical role as the third match against Taiwan and Japan. Before the finals, Boll stated, "If we can be on our peak, all three of us have the skills and the will to win the match. We will definitely go no limits to prove that this is our time." However, China ended up winning 3–0.

In 2021, Boll won the bronze medal at the 2021 World Table Tennis Championships in Houston, defeating Kanak Jha in the quarterfinals 4-2 before losing to Truls Möregårdh in the semifinals. At the age of 40, this was one of his major career achievements as he had only won one singles medal at World Championships or Olympic Games before (bronze at the 2011 World Table Tennis Championships).

Starting in 2022, Boll suffered from various injuries, such as a rip and a shoulder injury. These complicated his preparation for and even prevented him from competing in major events. Boll participated in the 2022 European Championships in Munich, but lost to Dang Qiu in straight sets. He could not play the 2023 World Championships in Durban at all. As a consequence, he was only ranked 182nd in the world in early 2024.

However, 2024 started more promising for Boll. He won the WTT Contender in Doha in January, beating top-12 players Jang Woojin, Lin Yun-Ju, and Tomokazu Harimoto back-to-back. As a consequence, he gained 137 places in the ITTF world rankings, jumping from rank 182 to 45.

At the end of May 2024, Boll announced on his social media that the Paris 2024 Olympics would be his final championship, after which he decided to retire.

== Technique ==
Boll is a left-handed player whose best weapon is his forehand topspin drive but who is also noted for his extremely quick backhand loop. His blade is the "Timo Boll ALC" with Dignics 09c rubbers on both sides. His present doubles partner is Patrick Franziska.

Boll's technique was ahead of its time as he was one of the first two-winged loopers. He employs the spin-block instead of a passive block to put more pressure on his opponents. He is renowned for being one of the top players when it comes to generating elevated amounts of spin, especially in his opening topspin. This is rendered possible by his low stance, quick acceleration and use of the wrist. This technique brought him a lot of success due to his opponents being put under pressure during the celluloid ball era. In recent years, due to the introduction of the plastic ball, which cannot be given as much spin, Boll relies more on his counter-topspin technique from both the backhand and forehand side. A good example of him employing this technique is his match against Fan Zhendong at the Austrian Open in 2019, in which he reached the deciding set against the 16 years younger World No. 1. This technique allows him to conserve energy but requires very good anticipation and reading of the opponent.

== Club history ==
Boll has played for TSV Höchst (1986 to 1994), FTG Frankfurt (1994 to 1995) and for TTV Gönnern (1995 to 2007). On 1 July 2007, he signed with Borussia Düsseldorf and played for the team for 18 years before retiring in 2025.

== Personal life ==
Boll married his long-time girlfriend, Rodelia Jacobi, on 31 December 2002. They have a daughter, Zoey Malaya, born 4 December 2013.

== Sponsorships ==
Boll has been sponsored by Butterfly table tennis since 1993. In May 2007 Boll extended his sponsorship until 2015 and is still playing Butterfly to this day. He has gone on to say that he is most satisfied with the agreement. Boll has his own racquet series with the company.

== Awards ==
- 1997 Table Tennis Junior Player of the Year
- 1998 German Table Tennis player of the Year
- 2005 Bambi Sport
- 2005 German Sportspersonality of the year – 3rd position
- 2006 Sportsman of the Year in Hessen
- 2007 Fair-Play-Award of Minister (Secretary) of the Interior Home Secretary
- 2007 German Sportsmen of the Year 2nd position
- 2008 Sportsman of the Year in Hessen
- 2010 Sportsman of the Year in Hessen
- 2010 German Sportspersonality of the year – 2nd position
- 2017 ITTF Male Table Tennis Star

== Titles ==
- World Cup 2002 and 2005, silver 2008, 2012, 2017 and 2018, bronze 2010 and 2014
- Single European Champion 2002, 2007, 2008, 2010, 2011, 2012, 2018 and 2021
- Team European Champion 2007, 2008, 2009, 2010, 2011, 2017 and 2019
- Europe Top-16 2002, 2003, 2006, 2008, 2010, 2018 and 2020
- European Super Cup 2007, 2008 and 2009
- ITTF World Tour/Pro Tour (19) and Grand Finals (1): Brasil 2001, Austria 2002, Japan 2003, Poland, Germany and Austria 2004, Japan, Sweden and Grand Finals 2005, China, Germany and Poland 2006, Austria, Germany and Poland 2008, Qatar, Germany, and Poland 2009, Japan 2010, Korea 2017.
- Double: European Championship 2002 (together with Zoltan Fejer-Konnerth), 2007, 2008, 2009 and 2010 (together with Christian Süß), Japan Open 2005, Pro Tour Grand Final 2005, 2009 (together with Christian Süß)
- Double: 2nd position World Championship 2005, 3rd position European Championship 2005 together with Christian Süß
- Team: 2nd position Olympic Games 2008; 3rd position Olympic Games 2012, 2016; 2nd position European Championship 2000, 2002, 2003, 2014, 2nd position World Championship 2004, 2010, 2012, 2014, 2018; 3rd position World Championship 2006.
- German Championship: 13-times Single-Winner (1998, 2001–2007, 2009, 2015, 2017–2019), 3-times Double-Winner (1999 together with Lars Hielscher, 2005 and 2007 together with Christian Süß)
- Champions League: Winner 2005 and 2006 with TTV RE-BAU Gönnern, 2009, 2010, 2011, 2018 and 2021 with Borussia Düsseldorf
- 3rd position Qatar and Kuwait Open Single 2007
- 3rd position World Championship Single 2011 and 2021
- As the first German number one of the world table tennis rankings (January 2003)

== See also ==
- List of table tennis players

Olympic Games
Preceded by Natascha Keller	Flagbearer for Germany; Rio de Janeiro 2016	Succeeded by Laura Ludwig & Patrick Hausding
