= Jenny Ovtcharov =

Swedish table tennis player

Personal information
- Born: 1 October 1988 Stockholm, Sweden
- Height: 1.72 m (5 ft 8 in)
- Weight: 54 kg (119 lb)

Sport
- Sport: Table tennis
- Club: Rönninge BTK
- Playing style: Right-handed, shakehand grip
- Equipment: Stiga

Jenny Ovtcharov (née Mellström; born October 1, 1988) is a Swedish table tennis player.

== Career ==
She grew up in the north of Sweden in Umeå, where her career started. She won Swedish youth championships in table tennis in 2002, 2003 and 2004. She played for the Swedish national team for 8 years.

== Personal life ==
She is married to the Olympic medalist Dimitrij Ovtcharov. They have a daughter together, Emma.
