= Zoltan Fejer-Konnerth =

German table tennis player

Personal information
- Nationality: Germany
- Born: 20 July 1978 (age 47) Odorheiu Secuiesc, Romania
Medal record
Men's table tennis
Representing Germany
World Table Tennis Championships
Silver medal – second place	2004 Doha	Men's team
Bronze medal – third place	2006 Bremen	Men's team

Zoltan Fejer-Konnerth (born 20 July 1978) is a male former international table tennis player from Germany.

He won a silver medal at the 2004 World Team Table Tennis Championships in the Swaythling Cup (men's team event) with Timo Boll, Jörg Roßkopf, Torben Wosik and Christian Süß for Germany. He competed in men's doubles with Timo Boll at the 2004 Summer Olympics.

Two years later he won a bronze medal at the 2006 World Team Table Tennis Championships in the Swaythling Cup (men's team event) with Boll, Roßkopf, Bastian Steger and Süß for Germany.

He also won three European Table Tennis Championships medals in 2002 and 2003.

== See also ==
- List of table tennis players
- List of World Table Tennis Championships medalists
