= Emil Ovtcharov =

Bulgarian footballer

Personal information
- Date of birth: 15 March 1973 (age 53)
- Place of birth: Bulgaria
- Position: Goalkeeper

Emil Ovtcharov (Bulgarian: Емил Овчаров) (born 15 March 1973) is a retired Bulgarian footballer who played as a goalkeeper. Over the course of his playing days he represented Haskovo, Marek Dupnitsa, and Dobrudzha Dobrich.
