= Butterfly (brand) =

Japanese sports equipment company

Tamasu Co., Ltd.

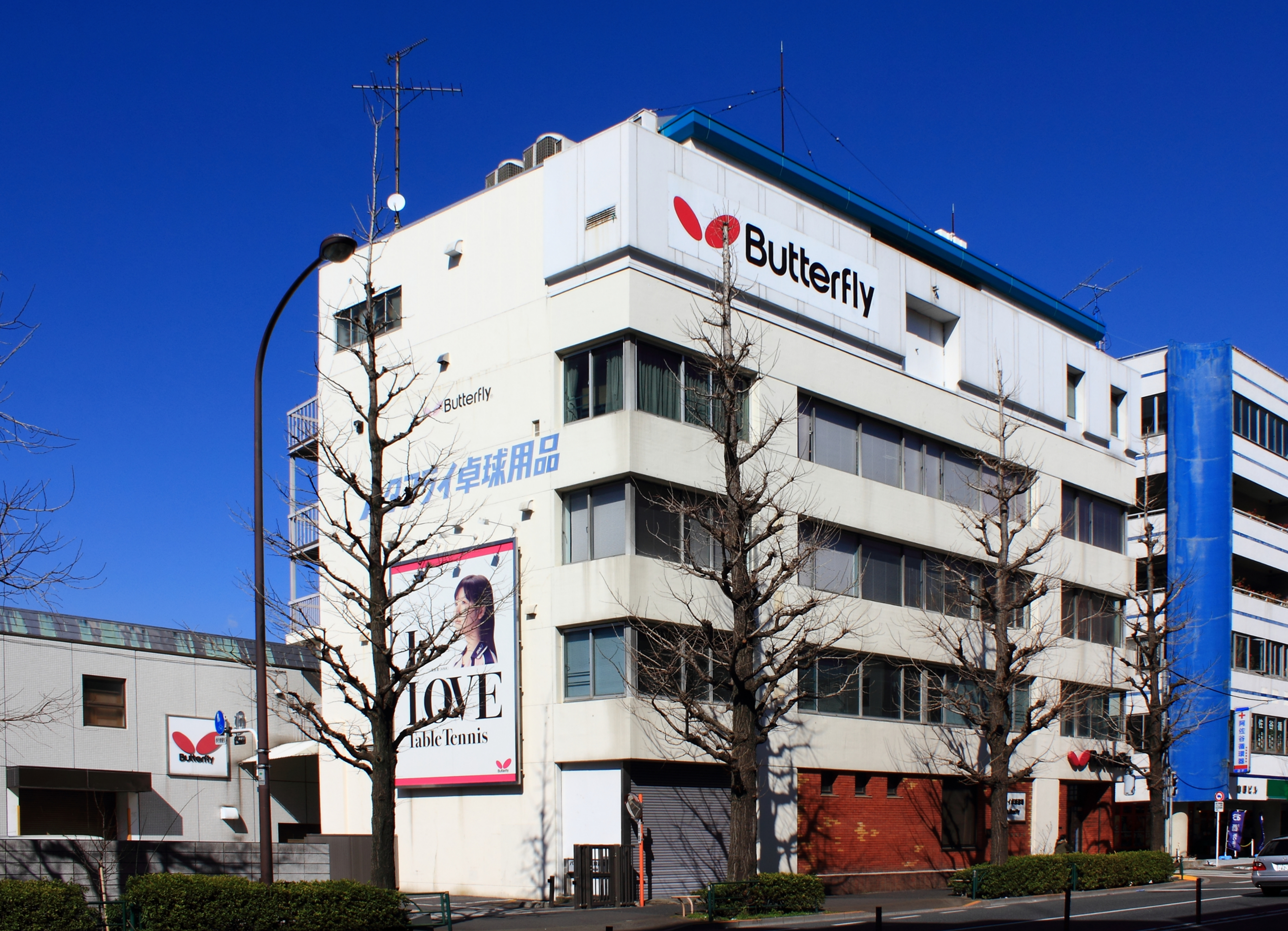
- Tamasu headquarters in Tokyo, Japan
- Company type: Public KK
- Industry: Sports equipment
- Founded: December 19, 1950; 75 years ago
- Headquarters: Suginami, Tokyo, Japan
- Area served: Worldwide
- Key people: Shunsaku Yamada
- Products: Table tennis equipment
- Website: butterfly.co.jp

Tamasu (株式会社タマス, Kabushiki-gaisha Tamasu) is a major table tennis apparel and equipment supplier using the brand name Butterfly, based in Japan with offices in Moers, Germany (Tamasu Butterfly Europe), Shanghai (Tamasu Butterfly China) and Seoul (Tamasu Butterfly Korea). The company was founded in 1950 in Yanai city, Japan, by Hikosuke Tamasu, a Japanese table tennis player at the time.

Butterfly sponsors top players and coaches in different countries such as USA, Korea, Canada, Germany, Japan, Poland, and many more. Butterfly is not only a corporation that supplies table tennis players with equipment and clothes, but also sponsors tournaments, open camps for training, and have clubs located in the Americas. Butterfly is the Official Equipment and Uniform Sponsor for Major League Table Tennis. The Butterfly blades use carbon materials such as Tamasu Carbon (TamCa) 5000, or Uniaxial Light Carbon (ULC), fiber materials such as Arylate (AL) or Zylon (ZL), or composite materials such as Arylate + TamCa5000 (ALC) or Zylon + ULC (ZLC) or high molarity (Super) ZLC (SZLC).
