= Ryu Seung-min =

South Korean table tennis player (born 1982)

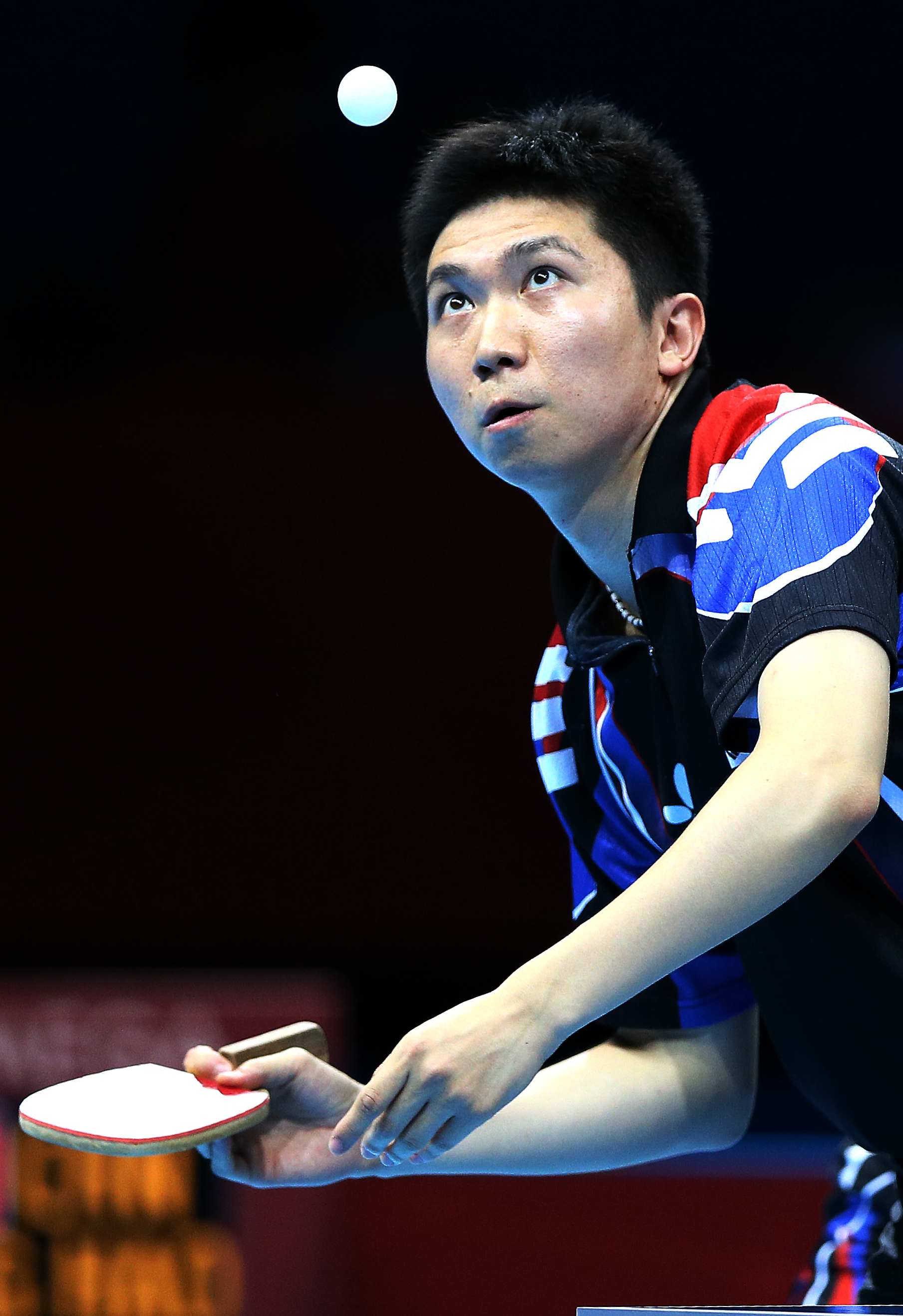
- Ryu during the 2012 London Olympics

Personal information
- Nationality: South Korea
- Born: 5 August 1982 (age 43) Seoul, South Korea
- Height: 178 cm (5 ft 10 in)
- Weight: 73 kg (161 lb)

Sport
- Sport: Table tennis
- Playing style: Right-handed, Japanese Penhold
- Highest ranking: 2 (September 2004)
Medal record
Men's table tennis
Representing South Korea
Olympic Games
Gold medal – first place	2004 Athens	Singles
Silver medal – second place	2012 London	Team
Bronze medal – third place	2008 Beijing	Team
World Championships
Silver medal – second place	2006 Bremen	Team
Silver medal – second place	2008 Guangzhou	Team
Bronze medal – third place	2001 Osaka	Team
Bronze medal – third place	2004 Doha	Team
Bronze medal – third place	2007 Zagreb	Singles
Bronze medal – third place	2010 Moscow	Team
Bronze medal – third place	2012 Dortmund	Team
World Cup
Silver medal – second place	2007 Barcelona	Singles
Silver medal – second place	2009 Linz	Team
Silver medal – second place	2011 Magdeburg	Team
Asian Games
Gold medal – first place	2002 Busan	Doubles
Silver medal – second place	2002 Busan	Team
Silver medal – second place	2002 Busan	Mixed Doubles
Silver medal – second place	2006 Doha	Team
Bronze medal – third place	2006 Doha	Singles

- Ryu Seung-min
- Hangul: 유승민
- Hanja: 柳承敏
- RR: Yu Seungmin
- MR: Yu Sŭngmin
- IPA: [ju.sɯŋ.min]

Ryu Seung-min (Korean: 유승민; Korean pronunciation: [ju.sɯŋ.min]; born August 5, 1982) is a South Korean table tennis player who won the gold medal at the 2004 Summer Olympics in the men's singles competition. His opponent was Wang Hao, a top-seeded player from the Chinese national team. Along the way, he defeated 1992 Olympic champion Jan-Ove Waldner with 4–1. At the 2008 and 2012 Summer Olympics he was part of the South Korean team that won the bronze and silver medals respectively. Ryu is ranked twenty-fifth in the world as of July 2013. In 2016, Ryu became a member of the International Olympic Committee (IOC), he was a member and Chair of the Athletes' Commission of the South Korean National Olympic Committee from 2016 to 2019. Since 2018, he counts among the ITTF Foundation Ambassadors, promoting sport for development and peace.

In March 2022, Ryu signed with World Star Entertainment.

== Style ==
Ryu Seung-min plays penhold style. Unlike players like Ma Lin and Wang Hao, Ryu never uses the backside of his blade – in fact, he does not even have rubber on it. Ryu relies on his outstanding footwork, explosive forehand loops and drives to win points. For some time he used Xiom (South Korea) table paddles and rubbers playing with his signature model "Ryu Seung Min Special" penhold and has been using ProZRSM ever since his victory at the 2004 Summer Olympics. Lately he switched again to Butterfly (Japan) equipment and now he uses their Ryu Seung-min G-Max blade with Tenergy 05.

As of December 1, 2012, he is ranked 20th in the world. His top ranking was world number 2 in September 2004, and since November 2001 he was always in top 25 of the ITTF world ranking list.

== Career records ==
Singles (as of April 9, 2015)

- Olympics: Gold medal (2004).
- World Championships: SF (2007).
- World Cup appearances: 5. Record: runner-up (2007).
- Pro Tour winner (3): Egypt, USA Open 2004; Chile Open 2008.
  Runner-up (4): Swedish Open 2001; Brazil Open 2002; Japan Open 2005; Slovenian Open 2007; Kuwait Open 2012.
- Pro Tour Grand Finals appearances: 9. Record: SF (2003, 05, 10).
- Asian Games: SF (2006).
- Asian Championships: SF (2003).

Men's doubles

- Olympics: 4th (2000).
- World Championships: QF (2001, 05, 09).
- Pro Tour winner (8): China (Qingdao) Open 2002; Croatian, Egypt, USA Open 2004; Korea Open 2005; Chinese Taipei Open 2006; Kuwait Open 2007; Brazil Open 2012.
  Runner-up (4): China (Changchun) Open 2000; Korea Open 2010; Austrian Open 2010; Japan Open 2012.
- Pro Tour Grand Finals appearances: 4. Record: SF (2012).
- Asian Games: winner (2002).
- Asian Championships: SF (2005).

Mixed doubles

- World Championships: QF (2003).
- Asian Games: runner-up (2002).

Team

- Olympics: 3rd (2008), 2nd (2012).
- World Championships: 2nd (2006, 08); 3rd (2001, 04, 10, 12).
- World Team Cup: 2nd (2009); 3rd (2007).
- Asian Games: 2nd (2002, 06).
- Asian Championships: 2nd (2005).

== Filmography ==
=== Television show ===
Year	Title	Network	Role	Notes	Ref.
2022	All Table Tennis!	tvN	Coach		
