= Dimitrij Ovtcharov =

German table tennis player

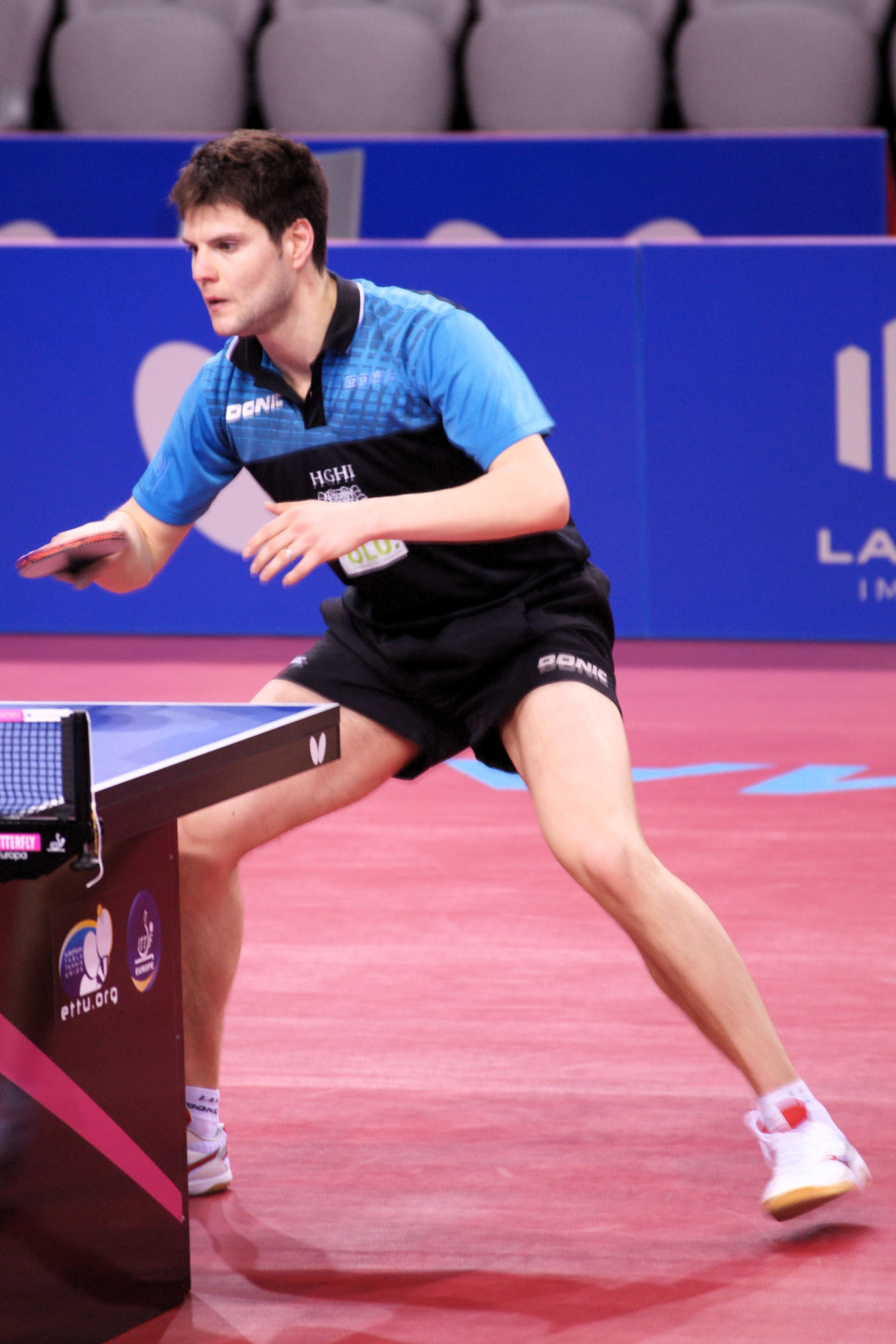
- Ovtcharov in 2017

Personal information
- Nationality: German
- Born: 2 September 1988 (age 38) Kyiv, Ukrainian SSR, Soviet Union
- Height: 186 cm (6 ft 1 in)
- Weight: 78 kg (172 lb)

Sport
- Sport: Table tennis
- Club: TTC RhönSprudel Fulda-Maberzell
- Playing style: Right-handed, shakehand grip
- Equipment: Blade: Butterfly Ovtcharov Innerforce ALC; Rubber: (forehand) Dignics 09C (backhand) Dignics 05
- Highest ranking: 1 (January 2018)
- Current ranking: 19 (5 October 2026)
Medal record
Men's table tennis
Representing Germany
Event	1st	2nd	3rd
Olympic Games	0	2	4
World Championships	0	4	1
World Cup	1	0	4
Olympic Games
Silver medal – second place	2008 Beijing	Team
Silver medal – second place	2020 Tokyo	Team
Bronze medal – third place	2012 London	Singles
Bronze medal – third place	2012 London	Team
Bronze medal – third place	2016 Rio de Janeiro	Team
Bronze medal – third place	2020 Tokyo	Singles
World Championships
Silver medal – second place	2010 Moscow	Team
Silver medal – second place	2012 Dortmund	Team
Silver medal – second place	2014 Tokyo	Team
Silver medal – second place	2018 Halmstad	Team
Bronze medal – third place	2023 Durban	Doubles
World Cup
Gold medal – first place	2017 Liège	Singles
Bronze medal – third place	2009 Linz	Team
Bronze medal – third place	2011 Magdeburg	Team
Bronze medal – third place	2013 Verviers	Singles
Bronze medal – third place	2015 Halmstad	Singles
European Games
Gold medal – first place	2015 Baku	Singles
Gold medal – first place	2019 Minsk	Team
Gold medal – first place	2023 Kraków–Małopolska	Team
European Championships
Gold medal – first place	2007 Belgrade	Team
Gold medal – first place	2008 Saint-Petersburg	Team
Gold medal – first place	2009 Stuttgart	Team
Gold medal – first place	2010 Ostrava	Team
Gold medal – first place	2011 Sopot	Team
Gold medal – first place	2013 Schwechat	Singles
Gold medal – first place	2013 Schwechat	Team
Gold medal – first place	2015 Ekaterinburg	Singles
Gold medal – first place	2017 Luxembourg City	Team
Gold medal – first place	2019 Nantes	Team
Silver medal – second place	2014 Lisbon	Team
Silver medal – second place	2015 Ekaterinburg	Team
Silver medal – second place	2020 Warsaw	Singles
Bronze medal – third place	2007 Belgrade	Singles
Bronze medal – third place	2012 Herning	Doubles
Bronze medal – third place	2024 Linz	Singles
Europe Top-12/Top-16
Gold medal – first place	2012 Lyon	Singles
Gold medal – first place	2015 Baku	Singles
Gold medal – first place	2016 Gondomar	Singles
Gold medal – first place	2017 Antibes	Singles
Gold medal – first place	2019 Montreux	Singles
Silver medal – second place	2018 Montreux	Singles
Bronze medal – third place	2014 Lausanne	Singles
Bronze medal – third place	2023 Montreux	Singles

Dimitrij Ovtcharov (Russian: Дмитрий Овчаров; born 2 September 1988) is a Soviet-born German table tennis player. His father Mikhail, a Soviet table tennis champion in 1982, moved his family to Germany shortly after Dimitrij was born.

Since 2008, Ovtcharov has won a total of two silver and four bronze medals at the Olympics, making him second most decorated male Olympian in the table tennis category in terms of the number of medals awarded. Ranked first January to February 2018, he is ranked ninth in the world by the International Table Tennis Federation (ITTF) as of November 2022.

== Career ==
At the 2008 Summer Olympics in Beijing, Ovtcharov won the silver medal as part of the German men's team, together with Timo Boll and Christian Süß.

He used a special technique in his serves, which was later picked by Time magazine as one of the top 50 innovations of 2008.

On 22 September 2010, Ovtcharov had been suspended by the German Table Tennis Federation (DTTB) due to a positive A-sample test for Clenbuterol that may be used as a performance-enhancing substance. Ovtcharov himself denied the doping accusation and requested a B-sample analysis which still tested positive. After hearings and further investigations, the hair sample voluntarily offered by Ovtcharov showed no evidence of clenbuterol and its abuse. DTTB later unanimously decided to cancel the suspension on 15 October 2010. The decision was endorsed by ITTF.

At the 2012 Summer Olympics, Ovtcharov won bronze medals in singles and team events. In June 2015, he won a gold medal at the inaugural European Games. At the 2016 Summer Olympics, he was defeated by Vladimir Samsonov in the singles quarter-final. He then won a team bronze medal. In June 2017, he won the title at the China Open against Timo Boll (4 sets to 3), and in August 2017 he won the title at the Bulgaria Open. In January 2018, Ovtcharov became the World's Number 1 Table Tennis Player.

=== 2021 ===
In March, Ovtcharov played in WTT Doha. He won the WTT Contender event and reached the semi-finals of the WTT Star Contender event. Notably, Ovtcharov made several key tactical adjustments to upset Lin Yun-Ju in the finals after losing to Lin in their previous four encounters.

As a result of his performance in Doha, Ovtcharov rejoined the top ten in the world rankings.

In June, Ovtcharov played in the European Table Tennis Championships, reaching the finals before losing to his German national teammate Timo Boll.

In July, two weeks before the Tokyo Olympics Ovtcharov withdrew from an internal German Olympic Scrimmage due to a leg injury.

Ovtcharov won bronze at the Tokyo Olympics in the men's singles event. Ovtcharov reached the finals of the men's team event, earning his record sixth Olympic medal.

== Equipment ==
Ovtcharov is a right-handed player and uses the shakehand grip. He is a Butterfly-sponsored athlete. He uses the Butterfly Ovtcharov Innerforce ALC blade with Butterfly Zyre 03 on both his forehand and backhand.

== Club career ==
- TSV Schwalbe Tündern
- Borussia Düsseldorf (2007–2009)
- Royal Villette Charleroi (2009–2010)
- Gazprom Fakel Orenburg (2010–2022)
- TTC Neu-Ulm (2022–2024)
- Olympiakos Piraeus (2023–2024)
- TTC RhönSprudel Fulda-Maberzell (2024–)

== Major League Table Tennis ==
Ovtcharov is a co-owner of the Princeton Revolution and sits on the Board of Governors for Major League Table Tennis (MLTT). He joined the league's ownership group at its inception and was officially appointed to the board in early 2025.

== Personal life ==
Ovtcharov married Swedish table tennis player Jenny Mellström in 2013. Their daughter, Emma, was born in 2016.

== Career records ==
Singles (as of 6 July 2013)

- Olympics: round of 16 (2008, 2024), Quarter-Finals (2016), bronze medal (2012, 2020).
- World Championships: round of 16 (2009, 2011, 2013, 2017), round of 64 (2015).
- World Cup appearances: 1st in 2017 5. Record: 5–8th (2008, 09, 10, 11), 3rd (2013, 2015).
- World Tour winner (9): 2010 India Open. 2011 Brazil Open. 2011 Korea Open. 2012 German Open. 2014 German Open. 2017 India Open. 2017 China Open. 2017 Bulgaria Open. 2017 German Open.
  Runner-up (2): 2009 Danish Open. 2010 Polish Open.
- World Tour Grand Finals appearances: 9. Record: Runner-up (2014, 2017).
- European Championships: SF (2007), Runner-up (2020), Winner (2013, 2015).
- Europe Top-12: Winner (2012).
- Europe Top-16: Winner (2015, 2016, 2017).

Doubles

- World Championships: round of 16 (2009).
- Pro Tour winner (1): 2007 Chinese Taipei Open.
- Pro Tour Grand Finals appearances: 1. Record: QF (2007).

Mixed doubles

- World Championships: round of 64 (2007).

Team

- Olympics: Silver (2008), Bronze (2012), Bronze (2016), Silver (2020).
- European Games: 4th (2015).
- World Championships: 2nd (2010, 2012, 2014, 2018).
- World Team Cup: 3rd (2009, 2011).
- European Championships: 1st (2007–2011, 2013, 2017, 2019) 2nd (2014, 2015).
