= Oh Sang-eun =

South Korean table tennis player (born 1977)

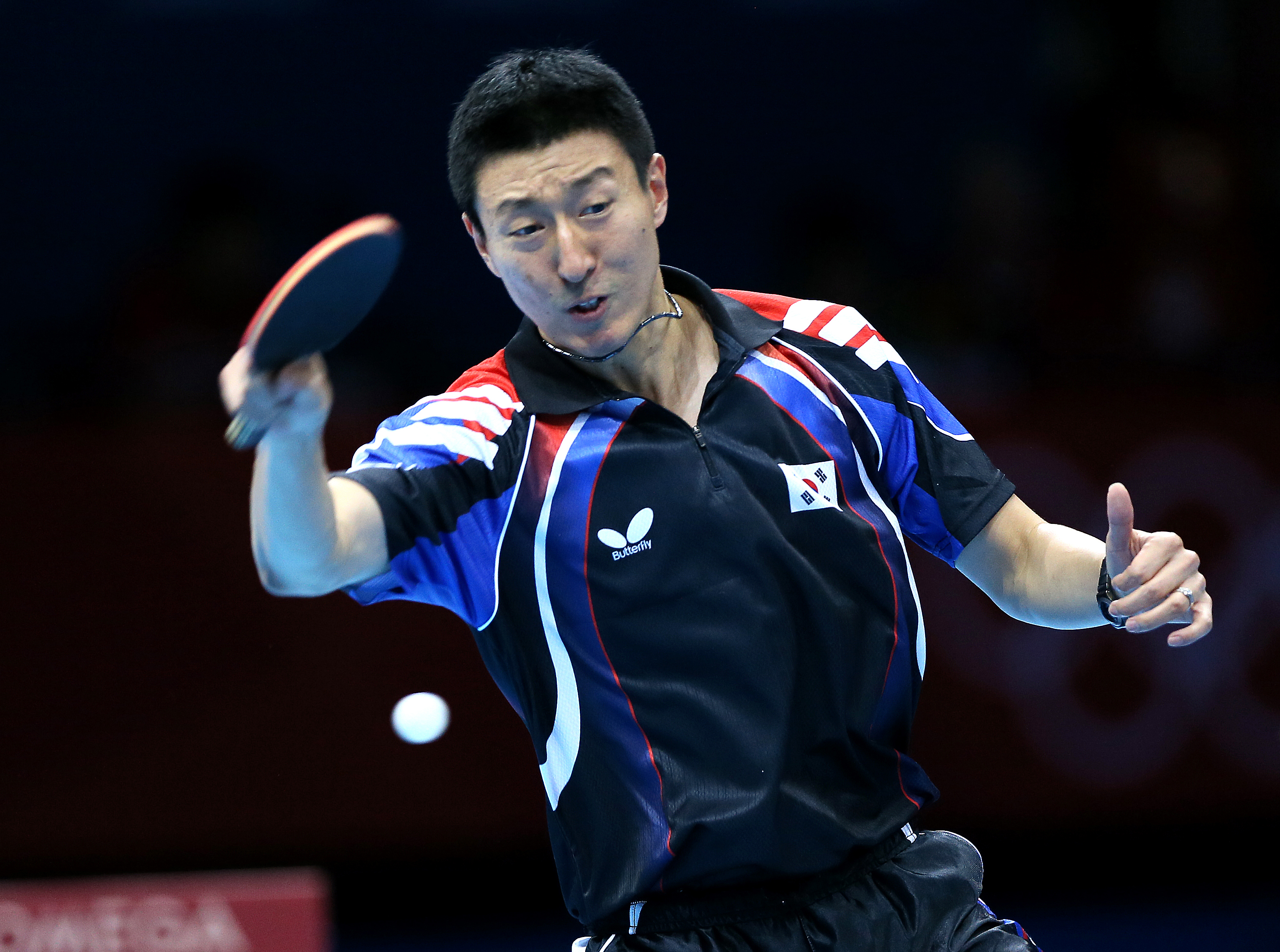
- Oh at the 2012 Summer Olympics

Personal information
- Nationality: South Korean
- Born: 13 April 1977 (age 49) Daegu, South Korea
- Height: 1.86 m (6 ft 1 in)

Sport
- Sport: Table tennis
- Playing style: Right-handed shakehand grip
- Equipment: Butterfly Oh Sang Eun (blade)
- Highest ranking: 5 (May 2007)
Medal record
Men's table tennis
Representing South Korea
Olympic Games
Silver medal – second place	2012 London	Team
Bronze medal – third place	2008 Beijing	Team
World Championships
Silver medal – second place	2001 Osaka	Mixed doubles
Silver medal – second place	2006 Bremen	Team
Bronze medal – third place	1997 Manchester	Team
Bronze medal – third place	2001 Osaka	Doubles
Bronze medal – third place	2001 Osaka	Team
Bronze medal – third place	2003 Paris	Doubles
Bronze medal – third place	2004 Doha	Team
Bronze medal – third place	2005 Shanghai	Singles
Bronze medal – third place	2010 Moscow	Team
Bronze medal – third place	2012 Dortmund	Team
World Cup
Silver medal – second place	2009 Linz	Team
Silver medal – second place	2010 Dubai	Team
Silver medal – second place	2011 Magdeburg	Team
Bronze medal – third place	2007 Magdeburg	Team

- Korean name
- Hangul: 오상은
- Hanja: 吳尚垠
- RR: O Sangeun
- MR: O Sangŭn

Oh Sang-eun (Korean: 오상은; Hanja: 吳尚垠; Korean pronunciation: [o.saŋ.ɯn]; born April 13, 1977, in Daegu, South Korea) is a South Korean table tennis player. His world ranking had been in the top 10 since the 2005 World Championships in Shanghai until April 2008. His highest ranking was number 5 in May 2007.

== Career records ==
Singles (as of December 26, 2010)

- Olympics: QF (2008).
- World Championships: SF (2005).
- World Cup appearances: 5. Record: 4th (2009).
- Pro Tour winner (7): Korea, Chile, USA Open 2005; Chinese Taipei Open 2006; Korea Open 2007; Japan Open 2009; Brazil Open 2012. Runner-up (2): USA Open 1996; Japan Open 2003.
- Pro Tour Grand Finals appearances: 6. Record: runner-up (2006); SF (2005).
- Asian Games: SF (1998, 2002).
- Asian Championships: SF (2007).

Men's doubles

- Olympics: QF (2000).
- World Championships: SF (2001, 03).
- Pro Tour winner (10): USA Open 1997; Danish Open 2001; Korea Open 2002; Chile, USA, German, Swedish Open 2005; Korea Open 2007; Polish Open 2009; Brazil Open 2012. Runner-up (9): USA Open 1996; China Open 1999; Qatar, Japan Open 2001; Qatar, USA, Danish Open 2002; Croatian Open 2003; Japan Open 2009.
- Pro Tour Grand Finals appearances: 3. Record: winner (2001); runner-up (2000, 05).
- Asian Games: runner-up (1998, 2002).
- Asian Championships: runner-up (1998); SF (1994, 2005).

Mixed doubles

- World Championships: runner-up (2001).
- Asian Games: runner-up (1998).
- Asian Championships: winner (2007); SF (1996, 98).

Team

- Olympics: 2nd (2012); 3rd (2008).
- World Championships: 2nd (2006); 3rd (1997, 2001, 04, 10).
- World Team Cup: 2nd (2009, 10); 3rd (2007).
- Asian Games: 2nd (1998, 2002, 06, 10).
- Asian Championships: 1st (1996); 2nd (1994, 98, 2005).
