= Christian Süß =

German table tennis player

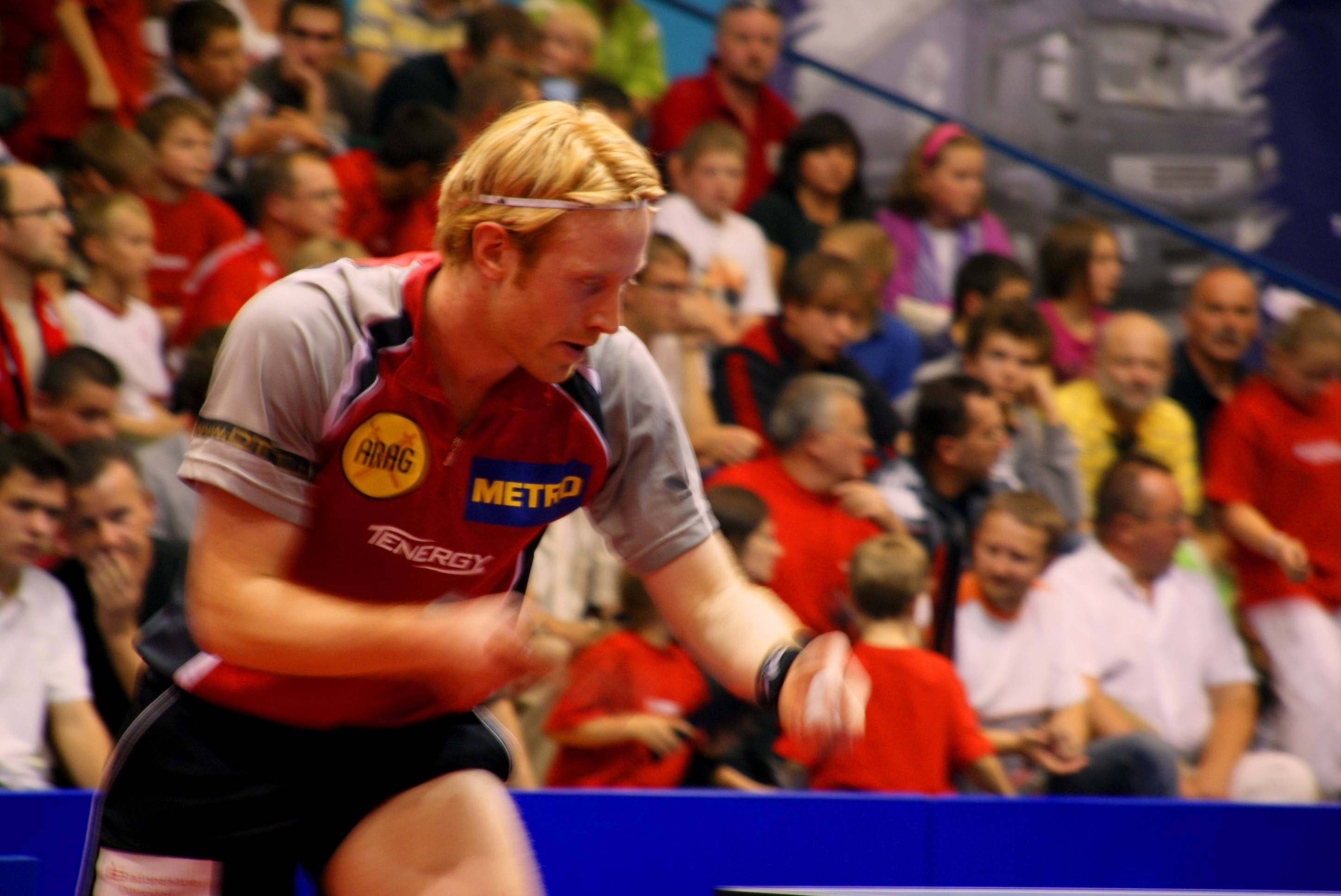

Personal information
- Full name: SUSS Christian
- Nicknames: Krille, Kiki
- Nationality: Germany
- Born: 28 July 1985 (age 40) Ahlen, West Germany
- Height: 1.86 m (6.1 ft)
- Weight: 80 kg (176 lb)

Sport
- Sport: Table tennis
- Club: Borussia Düsseldorf
- Playing style: Shakehand grip
- Highest ranking: 17 (in November 2010)
Medal record
Men's table tennis
Representing Germany
Olympic Games
Silver medal – second place	2008 Beijing	Team
World Championships
Silver medal – second place	2004 Doha	Team
Silver medal – second place	2005 Shanghai	Doubles
Silver medal – second place	2010 Moscow	Team
Silver medal – second place	2012 Dortmund	Team
Bronze medal – third place	2006 Bremen	Team
World Cup
Bronze medal – third place	2009 Linz	Team
European Championships
Gold medal – first place	2007 Belgrade	Doubles
Gold medal – first place	2007 Belgrade	Team
Gold medal – first place	2008 Saint-Petersburg	Doubles
Gold medal – first place	2008 Saint-Petersburg	Team
Gold medal – first place	2009 Stuttgart	Doubles
Gold medal – first place	2009 Stuttgart	Team
Gold medal – first place	2010 Ostrava	Doubles
Gold medal – first place	2010 Ostrava	Team
Bronze medal – third place	2005 Aarhus	Doubles
Bronze medal – third place	2010 Ostrava	Singles

Christian Süß (born 28 July 1985 in Ahlen, North Rhine-Westphalia) is a German table tennis player.

At the 2008 Summer Olympics in Beijing, Süß won the silver medal as part of the German men's team, together with Timo Boll and Dimitrij Ovtcharov.
