= Ma Lin (table tennis) =

Chinese table tennis player (born 1980)

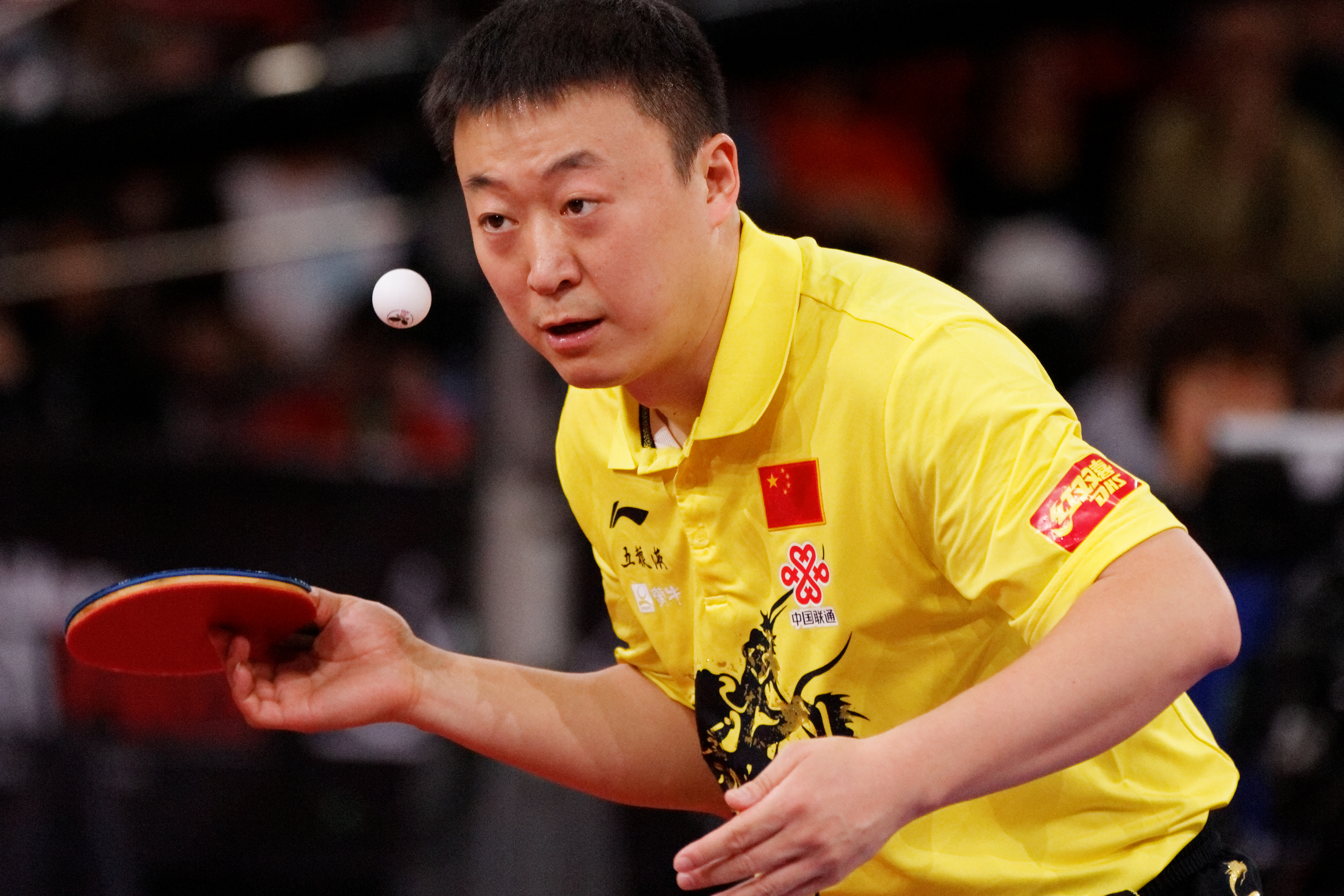
- Ma Lin in 2013

Personal information
- Native name: 马琳
- Full name: Ma Lin
- Nationality: China
- Born: 19 February 1980 (age 46) Shenyang, China
- Height: 174 cm (5 ft 9 in)
- Weight: 75 kg (165 lb)

Sport
- Sport: Table tennis
- Playing style: Chinese Penhold
- Highest ranking: 1 (October 2002)
Medal record
Event	1st	2nd	3rd
Olympic Games	3	0	0
World Championships	9	7	4
World Cup	6	0	1
Total	18	7	5
Men's table tennis
Representing China
Olympic Games
Gold medal – first place	2004 Athens	Doubles
Gold medal – first place	2008 Beijing	Singles
Gold medal – first place	2008 Beijing	Team
World Championships
Gold medal – first place	1999 Eindhoven	Mixed Doubles
Gold medal – first place	2001 Osaka	Team
Gold medal – first place	2003 Paris	Mixed Doubles
Gold medal – first place	2004 Doha	Team
Gold medal – first place	2006 Bremen	Team
Gold medal – first place	2007 Zagreb	Doubles
Gold medal – first place	2008 Guangzhou	Team
Gold medal – first place	2010 Moscow	Team
Gold medal – first place	2012 Dortmund	Team
Silver medal – second place	1999 Eindhoven	Singles
Silver medal – second place	2000 Kuala Lumpur	Team
Silver medal – second place	2005 Shanghai	Singles
Silver medal – second place	2007 Zagreb	Singles
Silver medal – second place	2007 Zagreb	Mixed Doubles
Silver medal – second place	2013 Paris	Doubles
Silver medal – second place	2011 Rotterdam	Doubles
Bronze medal – third place	2001 Osaka	Singles
Bronze medal – third place	2003 Paris	Doubles
Bronze medal – third place	2005 Shanghai	Doubles
Bronze medal – third place	2009 Yokohama	Singles
World Cup
Gold medal – first place	2000 Yangzhou	Singles
Gold medal – first place	2003 Jiangyin	Singles
Gold medal – first place	2004 Hangzhou	Singles
Gold medal – first place	2006 Paris	Singles
Gold medal – first place	2007 Magdeburg	Team
Gold medal – first place	2011 Magdeburg	Team
Bronze medal – third place	2005 Liége	Singles
ITTF World Tour Grand Finals
Gold medal – first place	1999 Sydney	Doubles
Gold medal – first place	2001 Hainan	Singles
Gold medal – first place	2002 Stockholm	Doubles
Gold medal – first place	2003 Guangzhou	Doubles
Gold medal – first place	2004 Beijing	Doubles
Gold medal – first place	2007 Beijing	Singles
Gold medal – first place	2011 London	Doubles
Silver medal – second place	1998 Paris	Doubles
Silver medal – second place	2004 Beijing	Singles
Silver medal – second place	2006 Hong Kong	Doubles
Silver medal – second place	2007 Beijing	Doubles
Bronze medal – third place	2000 Kobe	Singles
Bronze medal – third place	2000 Kobe	Doubles
Bronze medal – third place	2006 Hong Kong	Singles
Bronze medal – third place	2008 Macau	Singles
Asian Games
Gold medal – first place	2002 Busan	Team
Gold medal – first place	2006 Doha	Mixed Doubles
Gold medal – first place	2006 Doha	Team
Gold medal – first place	2010 Guangzhou	Team
Silver medal – second place	2006 Doha	Singles
Silver medal – second place	2006 Doha	Doubles
Silver medal – second place	2010 Guangzhou	Doubles
Bronze medal – third place	2002 Busan	Doubles
Bronze medal – third place	2002 Busan	Mixed Doubles
Asian Championships
Gold medal – first place	1996 Kallang	Mixed Doubles
Gold medal – first place	1998 Osaka	Doubles
Gold medal – first place	1998 Osaka	Team
Gold medal – first place	2000 Doha	Team
Gold medal – first place	2007 Yangzhou	Team
Silver medal – second place	1996 Kallang	Team
Bronze medal – third place	1996 Kallang	Singles
Bronze medal – third place	2000 Doha	Singles
Asian Cup
Gold medal – first place	1996 New Delhi	Singles

Ma Lin (Chinese: 马琳; pinyin: Mǎ Lín; born February 19, 1980) is a retired Chinese table tennis player, Olympic champion, and the current Chinese Women's Team Head Coach.

Ma learned to play table tennis at age five and became a member of the provincial team in 1990. In 1994, he joined the Chinese national team. Ma is the only male player ever to win Olympic gold in Singles, Doubles and Team. He previously held a professional era record of 5 major titles (4 World Cups and 1 Olympic Gold), having won more World Cups than any other male table tennis player in history. He has since been surpassed by Ma Long, who has won 8 major titles. He has won a total of 18 world championships in his career.

Since retiring in December 2013, Ma has been serving as the head coach of the Guangdong provincial table tennis team. He became the head coach of the China National Women's Team in December 2022.

== Style and equipment ==
Ma uses the penhold grip. An aggressive player, he is known for his converse unpredictable serves, heavy short push receives, fast footwork, and powerful third ball attacks. In addition to possessing a solid backhand block, Ma also uses the reverse penhold backhand (RPB), an innovative stroke utilizing the underside of the blade which allows a penholder to produce topspin from both wings. The most dangerous weapon Ma has in his arsenal, however, is his consistent forehand loop, which he often uses to end a point decisively. He is also considered a master at serving and his serve is considered one of the best in the world, earning the nickname "Ghost Service". It involves the ball bouncing back to the net instead of going straight off the table.

Because of this, Ma has claimed the titles "Maestro Ma Lin," "Defense Killer," and "Table Tennis Olympic Champion."

Ma is currently using a Yasaka Ma Lin Extra Offensive Penhold as his blade. He uses DHS NEO Skyline 2 TG2 for his forehand and Butterfly Bryce Speed FX for his backhand.

== Career ==
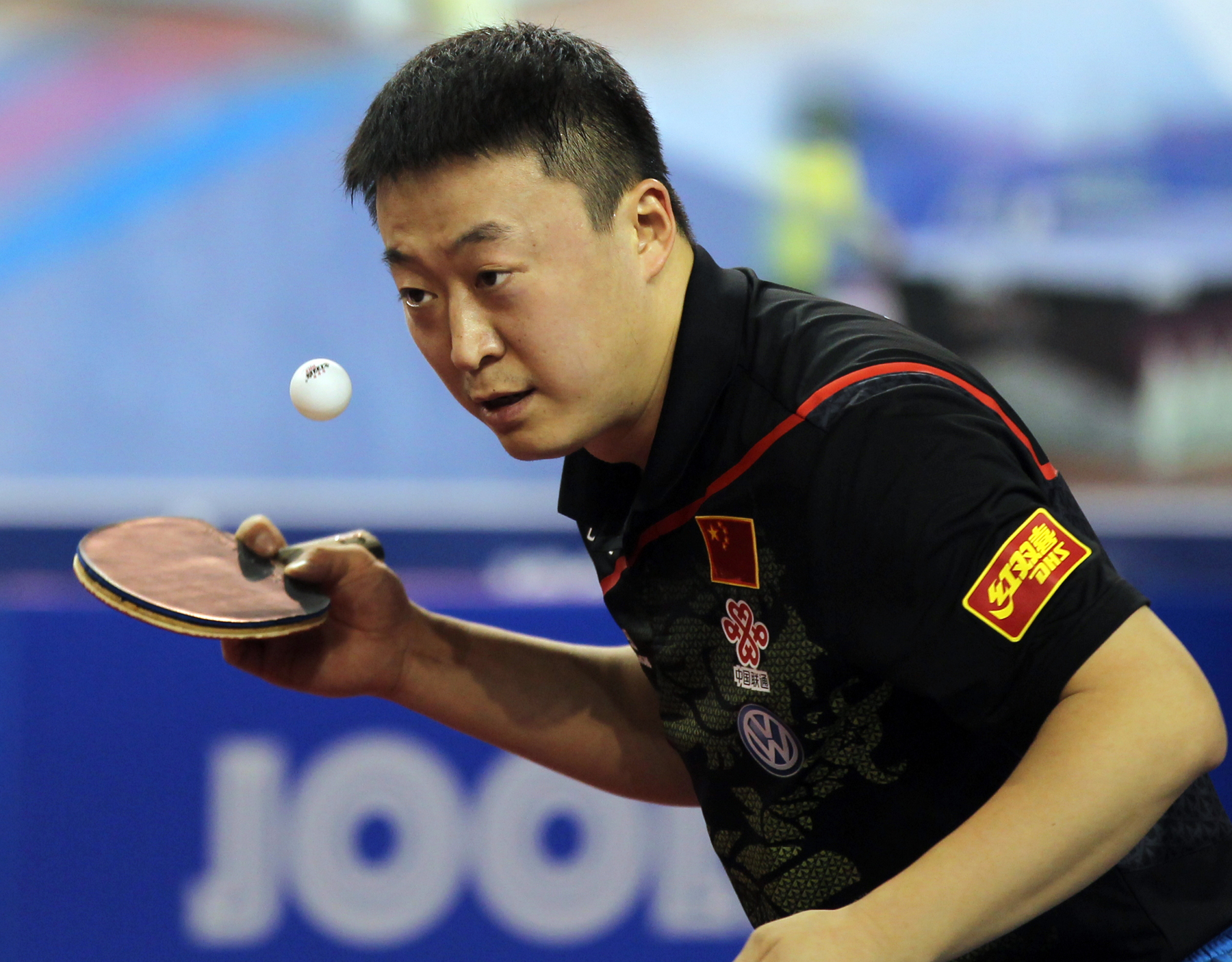
Ma Lin at the 2012 Qatar Open

In the China Table Tennis Super League, Ma played for Bayi Gongshang, Shandong Luneng, Guangdong Gotone, Shaanxi Yinhe and Ningbo Haitan. His transfer to Shaanxi Yinhe for over 5 million Chinese yuan was a league record. His next transfer was to Ningbo Haitan for just 1.3 million yuan (US$168,000), including 1 million yuan in salary. Ma's training attitude was very serious, especially during the preparation for the Guangdong Ninth National Games. The training volume was large, and training times were long. Ma not only practiced hard to serve, but also practiced multiple balls back and forth, which requires a wide range of running. He practiced so hard that broke a pair of sneakers every week. He has won four World Cup trophies (2000, 2003, 2004, 2006), more than any other player in history, but has lost three times in the World Championship finals (1999, 2005, 2007). Ma reached the finals three times, but finished as the runner up all three times. The first time, in the 1999 World Table Tennis Championships in Eindhoven, Ma defeated Samsonov and Waldner to reach the final, where he faced Liu Guoliang. The two fought to a 2–2 draw, and Liu led 23–22 in the final game. Ma blocked and Liu won 24–22. The second time, in the 2005 Shanghai World Table Tennis Championships, in the men's singles final, Ma trailed Wang Liqin 2–3 and 7–10 in the 6th game. Finally, Ma lost the match 7–11. The thirdtime, at the 2007 World Table Tennis Championships in Zagreb, Ma met Wang Liqin again in the final. Ma made full preparations, leading 3–1 and 7–1 in the fifth game. However, Wang made a comeback and once again defeated Ma.

At the 2004 Olympics, coach Cai Zhenhua said that Ma was the best of the three Chinese players. Surprisingly in the following round, Ma lost to Waldner. Ma was shocked, and the coaches suddenly had a big problem: there was no one protecting the bottom half of the draw. They were also worried about men's doubles, because one of their two pairs had been eliminated in the first round. If Ma could not adjust in time, with Chen Qi's inexperience, the last pair might also be eliminated. Under pressure, Ma and Chen won the next three rounds and gold for China. Ma / Chen played against Denmark's Maze / Tugwell in the semifinals. Ma / Chen won the first game. In the second, they were ahead 10–6 and were caught up by the Danes, losing the game 11–13. After the score was tied at 2–2 in games, Ma / Chen fell behind 6–9 in game 5, but came back to win 13–11. In the finals, Ma / Chen played against Hong Kong's Ko Lai Chak / Li Ching. Despite losses in the third and fifth games, Ma / Chen won.

At the 2008 Summer Olympics, Ma won the teams competition with his compatriots Wang Liqin and Wang Hao. In the men's singles, Ma defeated Korean Oh Sang Eun in the quarterfinals (4–0) and Wang Liqin in the semifinals (4–2). Ma defeated Wang Hao (4–1) in the finals, improving to 15–10 head-to-head against Wang.

Ma is considered to be the true Olympiad of table tennis, because he achieved all possible titles in the Olympics (Athens 2004 – Doubles Champion with Chen Qi, Beijing 2008 – Singles Champion, Team Events Champion). Ma was inducted into the ITTF Hall of Fame in 2010.

== Coaching career ==
After retirement, Ma has been a coach for the Chinese national team. Since 2013, he has coached the Guangdong provincial team. Ma was appointed as the head coach of the China National Women's Team from December 2022.

== Personal life ==
Ma's alleged girlfriend, Bai Yang, was dropped from Women's National Team in 2004. It is against the rules to date in the Chinese National Team for athletes under twenty years old. Ma went on to secretly marry actress Zhang Yi in late 2004. They divorced in 2009. On this Ma stated, "Table tennis would be my wife forever. This will never change." Ma married Zhang Yaqing in December 2013. On April 19, 2016, they had a son.

== Anecdotes ==
In April 2024, a LeetCode profile became famous as it bore Ma's photo and description and was in the top 0.01% of LeetCode users. Chinese journalists investigated this and discovered it has nothing to do with the famous tennis table athlete.

== Achievements ==
Olympic Games:

- 2004 Olympics, Athens: Champion (Doubles, with Chen Qi)
- 2008 Olympics, Beijing: Champion (Singles)
- 2008 Olympics, Beijing: Champion (Team, with Wang Liqin & Wang Hao)

World Championships:

- 1999 Eindhoven: Champion (Mixed Doubles, with Zhang Yingying)), Runner-up (Singles)
- 2000 Kuala Lumpur: Runner-up (Team)
- 2001 Osaka: Champion (Team), Third (Singles)
- 2003 Paris: Champion (Mixed Doubles, with Wang Nan), Third (Doubles, with Qin Zhijian)
- 2004 Doha: Champion (Team)
- 2005 Shanghai: Runner-up (Singles), Third (Doubles, with Chen Qi)
- 2006 Bremen: Champion (Team)
- 2007 Zagreb: Champion (Doubles, with Chen Qi), Runner-up (Singles), Runner-up (Mixed Doubles, with Wang Nan)
- 2008 Guangzhou: Champion (Team)
- 2009 Yokohama: Third (Singles)
- 2010 Moscow: Champion (Team)
- 2011 Rotterdam: Runner-up (Doubles, with Chen Qi)
- 2012 Dortmund: Champion (Team)
- 2013 Paris: Runner-up (Doubles, with Hao Shuai)

World Cup:

- 2000 Yangzhou: Champion (Singles)
- 2003 Jiangyin: Champion (Singles)
- 2004 Hangzhou: Champion (Singles)
- 2005 Liege: Third (Singles)
- 2006 Paris: Champion (Singles)
- 2007 Magdeburg: Champion (Team)
- 2011 Magdeburg: Champion (Team)

Pro Tour Grand Finals:

- 1998 Paris: Runner-up (Doubles, with Qin Zhijian)
- 1999 Sydney: Champion (Doubles, with Kong Linghui)
- 2000 Kobe: Third (Singles), Third (Doubles, with Liu Guozheng)
- 2001 Hainan: Champion (Singles)
- 2002 Stockholm: Champion (Doubles, with Kong Linghui))
- 2003 Guangzhou: Champion (Doubles, with Chen Qi)
- 2004 Beijing: Champion (Doubles, with Chen Qi), Runner-up (Singles)
- 2006 Hong Kong: Runner-up (Doubles, with Chen Qi), Third (Singles)
- 2007 Beijing: Champion (Singles), Runner-up (Doubles, with Wang Hao)
- 2008 Macau: Third (Singles)
- 2011 London: Champion (Doubles, with Zhang Jike)

Pro Tour Singles Winner (×20)

- 1998 Malaysia Open
- 1999 Australian Open
- 2001 Danish Open
- 2002 USA Open, German Open, Polish Open, Danish Open
- 2003 Korea Open, China Open, Danish Open
- 2004 China Open (Wuxi)
- 2006 Kuwait Open, China Open, Singapore Open
- 2007 Qatar Open, China Open (Nanjing), French Open
- 2008 Qatar Open, Japan Open
- 2011 China Open (Shenzhen)

Pro Tour Doubles Winner (×37)

- 1997 Australian Open, Malaysia Open
- 1998 Japan Open, China Open, Lebanon Open, Yugoslav Open, Swedish Open
- 1999 Japan Open, French Open
- 2000 Polish Open, Swedish Open
- 2001 Japan Open
- 2002 USA Open, German Open, Netherlands Open
- 2003 Korea Open, China Open, Japan Open, Danish Open, Swedish Open
- 2004 Greece Open, Singapore Open, China Open (Wuxi)
- 2006 Kuwait Open, Singapore Open, Japan Open
- 2007 Croatia Open, China Open (Shenzhen), French Open
- 2008 Kuwait Open, Qatar Open, China Open
- 2009 Kuwait Open
- 2010 Qatar Open, China Open
- 2011 UAE Open, China Open (Suzhou)

Asian Games:

- 2002 Busan: Champion (Team), Third (Doubles & with Kong Linghui), Third (Mixed Doubles & with Li Nan)
- 2006 Doha: Champion (Team), Champion (Mixed Doubles, with Wang Nan), Runner-up (Singles), Runner-up (Doubles, with Chen Qi)
- 2010 Guangzhou: Champion (Team), Runner-up (Doubles, with Xu Xin)

Asian Championships:

- 1996 Kallang: Champion (Mixed Doubles, with Wu Na), Runner-up (Team), Third (Singles)
- 1998 Osaka: Champion (Team), Champion (Doubles, with Liu Guoliang)
- 2000 Doha: Champion (Team), Third (Singles)
- 2007 Yangzhou: Champion (Team)

Asian Cup:

- 1996 New Delhi: Champion (Singles)

National games:

- 1997 National Games, Shanghai: Champion (Team), Runner-up (Singles)
- 2001 National Games, Guangzhou: Champion (Singles), Champion (Doubles, with Liu Guozheng)
- 2005 National Games, Nanjing: Runner-up (Doubles, with Zhangchao)
- 2009 National Games, Shandong: Runner-up (Team)

National Championships:

- 1998 National Championships: Champion (Team), Champion (Mixed Doubles, with Sun Jin), Runner-up (Doubles, with Qin Zhijian), Third (Singles)
- 1999 National Championships: Champion (Singles), Champion (Doubles, with Qin Zhijian), Third (Mixed Doubles, with Zhang Yingying)
- 2003 National Championships: Champion (Team), Champion (Mixed Doubles, with Wang Nan), Third (Doubles, with Chen Qi)
- 2006 National Championships: Champion (Singles), Champion (Doubles, with Chen Qi), Champion (Mixed Doubles, with Wang Nan)
- 2007 National Championships: Champion (Doubles, with Wang Liqin)
- 2010 National Championships: Champion (Team), Third (Doubles, with Zhang Jike)
- 2011 National Championships: Champion (Doubles, with Wang Hao), Runner-up (Singles), Third (Team)
- 2012 National Championships: Third (Doubles, with Zhangchao)

== See also ==
- List of table tennis players
