= Wang Hao (table tennis, born 1983) =

Chinese table tennis player

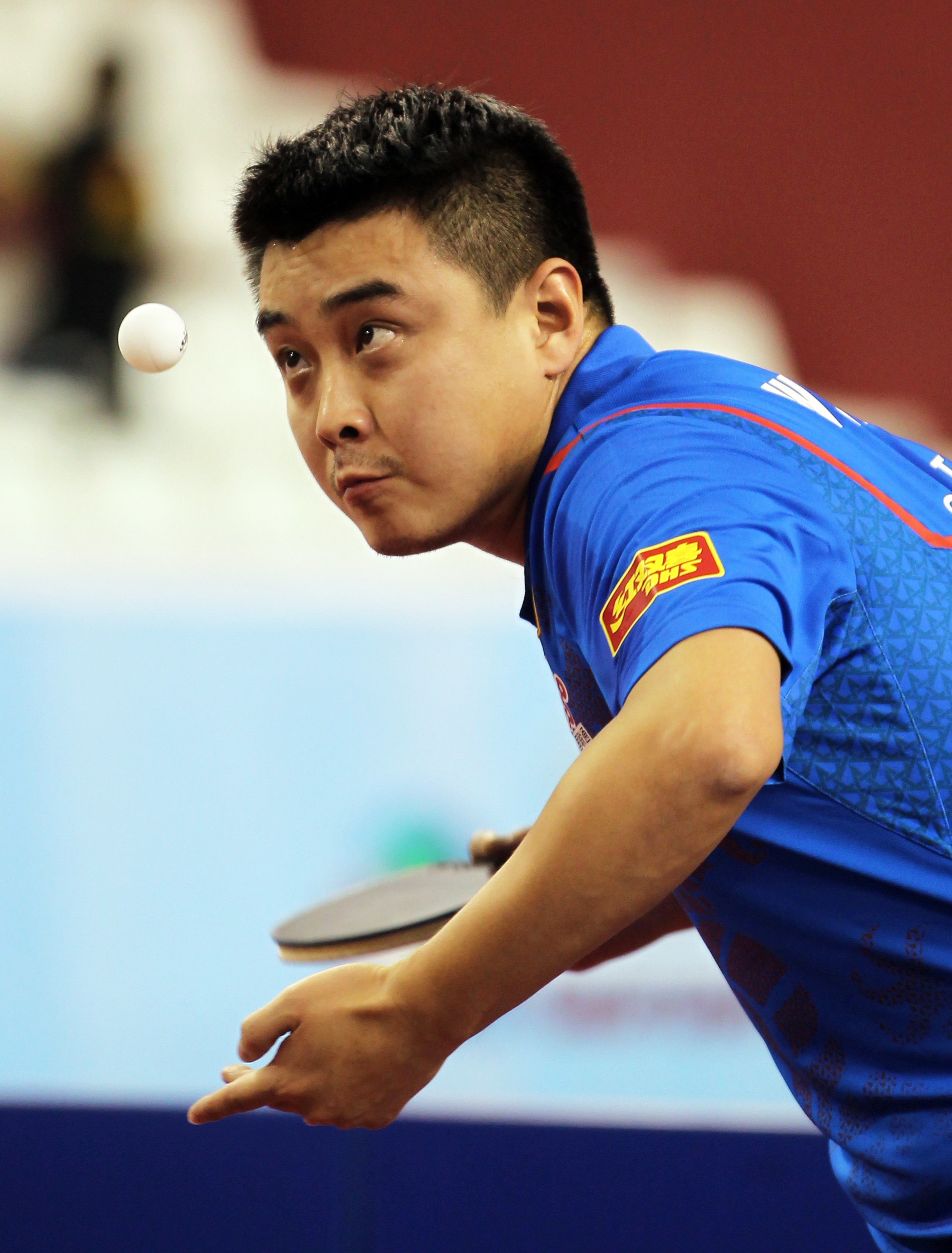

Personal information
- Nationality: China
- Born: December 15, 1983 (age 42) Changchun, Jilin Province, China
- Height: 1.75 m (5 ft 9 in)
- Weight: 70 kg (154 lb)

Sport
- Sport: Table tennis
- Playing style: Penholder based on shakehand style
- Highest ranking: 1 (Dec 2004, Oct 2007–Jul 2009, Apr–Sep 2011)
Medal record
Men's table tennis
Representing China
Olympic Games
Gold medal – first place	2008 Beijing	Team
Gold medal – first place	2012 London	Team
Silver medal – second place	2004 Athens	Singles
Silver medal – second place	2008 Beijing	Singles
Silver medal – second place	2012 London	Singles
World Championships
Gold medal – first place	2004 Doha	Team
Gold medal – first place	2005 Shanghai	Doubles
Gold medal – first place	2006 Bremen	Team
Gold medal – first place	2008 Guangzhou	Team
Gold medal – first place	2009 Yokohama	Singles
Gold medal – first place	2009 Yokohama	Doubles
Gold medal – first place	2010 Moscow	Team
Gold medal – first place	2012 Dortmund	Team
Gold medal – first place	2014 Tokyo	Team
Silver medal – second place	2003 Paris	Doubles
Silver medal – second place	2007 Zagreb	Doubles
Silver medal – second place	2011 Rotterdam	Singles
Silver medal – second place	2013 Paris	Singles
Bronze medal – third place	2003 Paris	Mixed Doubles
Bronze medal – third place	2007 Zagreb	Singles
Bronze medal – third place	2011 Rotterdam	Doubles
World Cup
Gold medal – first place	2007 Barcelona	Singles
Gold medal – first place	2007 Magdeburg	Team
Gold medal – first place	2008 Liege	Singles
Gold medal – first place	2010 Dubai	Team
Gold medal – first place	2010 Magdeburg	Singles
Gold medal – first place	2011 Magdeburg	Team
Gold medal – first place	2013 Guangzhou	Team
Silver medal – second place	2005 Liége	Singles
Silver medal – second place	2006 Paris	Singles
Silver medal – second place	2011 Paris	Singles
Bronze medal – third place	2004 Hangzhou	Singles
Asian Championships
Gold medal – first place	2003 Bangkok	Singles
Gold medal – first place	2003 Bangkok	Team
Gold medal – first place	2005 Jeju-do	Team
Gold medal – first place	2007 Yangzhou	Singles
Gold medal – first place	2007 Yangzhou	Team
Silver medal – second place	2007 Yangzhou	Doubles
Bronze medal – third place	2003 Bangkok	Doubles
Asian Cup
Gold medal – first place	2005 New Delhi	Singles
Gold medal – first place	2006 Kobe	Singles
Silver medal – second place	2009 Hangzhou	Singles

Wang Hao (Chinese: 王皓; pinyin: Wáng Hào; born December 15, 1983) is a retired Chinese table tennis player and multiple-time Olympic medallist. He is the current head coach of the Chinese Men's Table Tennis Team.

Wang became the world champion in men's singles in 2009, defeating three-time World Champion Wang Liqin 4–0. Wang was also a three-time World Cup Champion in 2007, 2008 and 2010, as well as a three-time singles silver medalist at the 2004 Summer Olympics, 2008 Summer Olympics, and the 2012 Summer Olympics. He was ranked #1 on the official ITTF world rankings for 27 consecutive months from October 2007 to December 2009. In January 2010, he was surpassed by Ma Long. In April 2011, Wang reclaimed his #1 ranking. He is known to execute the Reverse Penhold Backhand (RPB) with exceptional skill.

During his career, he appeared a record twelve times in major world competition finals. In men's singles, he won the Asian Championship, Asian Cup, Asian Games, and Chinese National Games at least once.

Wang retired from the national team at the end of 2014. As of 2023, he is the head coach of the Chinese Men's Table Tennis Team.

== Equipment ==
Wang used a DHS Hurricane Hao blade (a special blade for Wang called N656) with a DHS Neo Skyline III Blue Sponge for forehand and Butterfly Sriver topsheet on Bryce sponge for his backhand.

== Playing style ==
Wang uses a penhold grip. He is representative of a new wave of penhold players, having good attacking and defensive skills off both wings of the table. The greater freedom of the wrist involved in a penhold grip allows Wang to generate large amounts of spin on the forehand side.

Compared to most pen-hold players on the professional circuit, Wang uses the reverse-side for almost all shots on the backhand side, with the small exception of balls placed very slow and short within the table during serves. This style of using the reverse-side exclusively for the backhand was considered to be improper, and when he first joined the national team most players did not think highly of him.

== Personal life ==
Wang and Yan Boya met in 2010 and they married in 2013. The same year, they had a son, Wang Ruiting. Wang Hao stated he would prefer his son to not pursue table tennis.

== Achievements ==
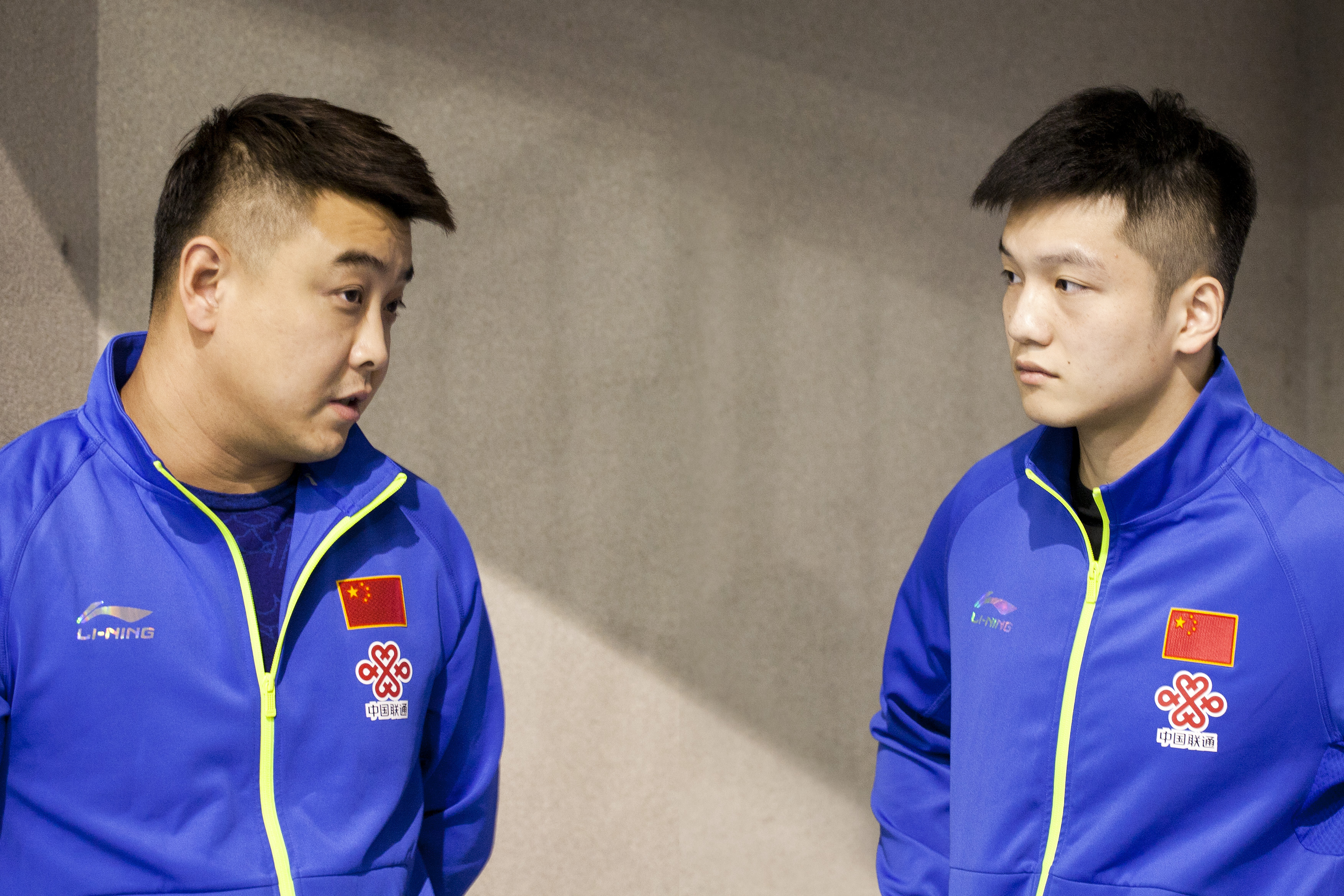
ITTF World Tour 2017 German Open, Wang Hao as coach of Fan Zhendong

- 1996: joined Jilin Provincial Table Tennis Team
- 1998: joined National Team and turned pro
- 1999 World Club Championships: Champion, team
- 1999 Asian Junior Table Tennis Championships: Champion, team; runner-up, men's singles and men's doubles
- 2000 World Club Championship: Runner-up, men's team
- 2001 Ninth National Games: Champion, men's team
- 2002 ITTF Pro Tour, Netherlands: Champion, men's singles; third, men's doubles
- 2002 ITTF Pro Tour, Egypt: Champion, men's singles; third, men's doubles
- 2003 47th World Table Tennis Championships: Runner-up, men's doubles : third, mixed doubles
- 2003 ITTF Pro Tour, Croatia: Champion, men's singles
- 2003 ITTF Pro Tour, China: Runner-up, men's singles and men's doubles
- 2003 ITTF Pro Tour, Denmark: Champion, men's doubles
- 2003 ITTF Pro Tour, Sweden: Champion, men's doubles
- 2003 Asian Table Tennis Championships: Champion, men's team and men's singles; third, men's doubles
- 2004 47th World Team Table Tennis Championships: Champion, men's team
- 2004 Olympics: Silver medal, men's singles
- 2004 World Cup: Third, men's singles
- 2004 ITTF Pro Tour, Greece: Champion, men's singles; runner-up, men's doubles
- 2004 ITTF Pro Tour, South Korea: Champion, men's doubles; runner-up, men's singles
- 2004 ITTF Pro Tour, Changchun: Champion, men's doubles; runner-up, men's singles
- 2005 48th World Table Tennis Championships: Champion, men's doubles
- 2005 Asia Cup: Champion, men's singles
- 2005 Asian Table Tennis Championships: Champion, men's team
- 2005 Qatar Open: Champion, men's doubles
- 2005 China Open: Runner-up, men's doubles (Harbin); Runner-up, men's singles (Shenzhen)
- 2005 World Cup: Runner-up, men's singles
- 2006 48th World Team Table Tennis Championships: Champion, men's team
- 2006 World Cup: Runner-up, men's singles
- 2006 ITTF Pro Tour, Slovenia: Champion, men's singles
- 2006 ITTF Pro Tour, Croatia: Champion, men's doubles
- 2006 ITTF Pro Tour, Qatar: Champion, men's doubles
- 2006 ITTF Pro Tour, Japan: Champion, men's doubles; runner-up, men's singles
- 2006 Asian Games: Champion, men's singles and team
- 2007 World Table Tennis Championships: Runner-up, men's doubles; third, men's singles
- 2007 World Cup: Champion, men's team and men's singles
- 2007 ITTF Pro Tour, Slovenia: Champion, men's singles
- 2007 ITTF Pro Tour, Croatia: Champion, men's doubles
- 2007 ITTF Pro Tour, Shenzhen: Champion, men's singles and men's doubles
- 2007 ITTF Pro Tour, Nanjing: Champion, men's doubles; runner-up, men's singles
- 2007 ITTF Pro Tour, Japan: Champion, men's singles; runner-up, men's doubles
- 2007 Asian Table Tennis Championships: Champion, men's team and men's singles; runner-up, men's doubles
- 2008 Olympics: Champion, men's team
- 2008 Olympics: Silver medal, men's singles
- 2008 World Team Table Tennis Championships: Champion, men's team
- 2008 World Cup: Champion, men's singles
- 2009 World Table Tennis Championships: Champion, men's singles and men's double with Chen Qi
- 2009 Eleventh National Games: Champion, men's singles and mixed doubles and men's team
- 2010 World Team Table Tennis Championships: Champion, men's team
- 2010 World Cup: Champion, men's singles
- 2010 Asian Games: Silver Medal, men's singles
- 2011 World Table Tennis Championships: Runner-up, men's singles; third, men's doubles
- 2011 World Cup: Runner-up, men's singles
- 2012 Olympics: Silver medal, men's singles
- 2012 Olympics: Champion, men's Team.
- 2013 World Table Tennis Championships: Runner-up, men's singles

== See also ==
- World Table Tennis Championships
