= Table tennis grips and playing styles =

Table tennis is unique among racket sports in that it supports a wide variety of playing styles and methods of gripping the racket, at even the highest levels of play. This article describes some of the most common table tennis grips and playing styles seen in competitive play. The playing styles listed in this article are broad categories with permeable boundaries, and most players will possess some combination of these styles while leaning towards a "favorite".

As of 2023, shakehand grips and attack-oriented playing styles are the most popular styles in high-level play. While many argue that this is because shakehand grips and attacking styles have a competitive advantage, it is also true that the shakehand grip is easier to learn as a beginner, and attack-oriented playing styles have broader aesthetic appeal than defensive playing styles. Regardless, players with a variety of playing styles and grip techniques still manage to play and win tournaments at the highest level.

In the 1970s, most European teams focused on training all of their players with the same equipment and playing style: shakehand grip with inverted rubber on the racket, playing a loop-focused attacking style, using the forehand to cover 2/3 of the table and backhand to cover 1/3 of the table. In contrast, the Chinese team maintained a wide variety of playing styles, equipment, and grip variations among their players. The diversity maintained by the Chinese team is no doubt a factor in their dominance of the sport over the past several decades, and European teams have recently figured this out and followed suit.

== Racket grips ==
Competitive table tennis players grip their rackets in a variety of ways. Almost all competitive players grip their rackets with either the shakehand grip or a penhold grip. Numerous variations on gripping styles exist. The rules of the International Table Tennis Federation (ITTF) do not prescribe the manner in which one must grip the racket.

=== Shakehand (aka "Handshake") grip ===
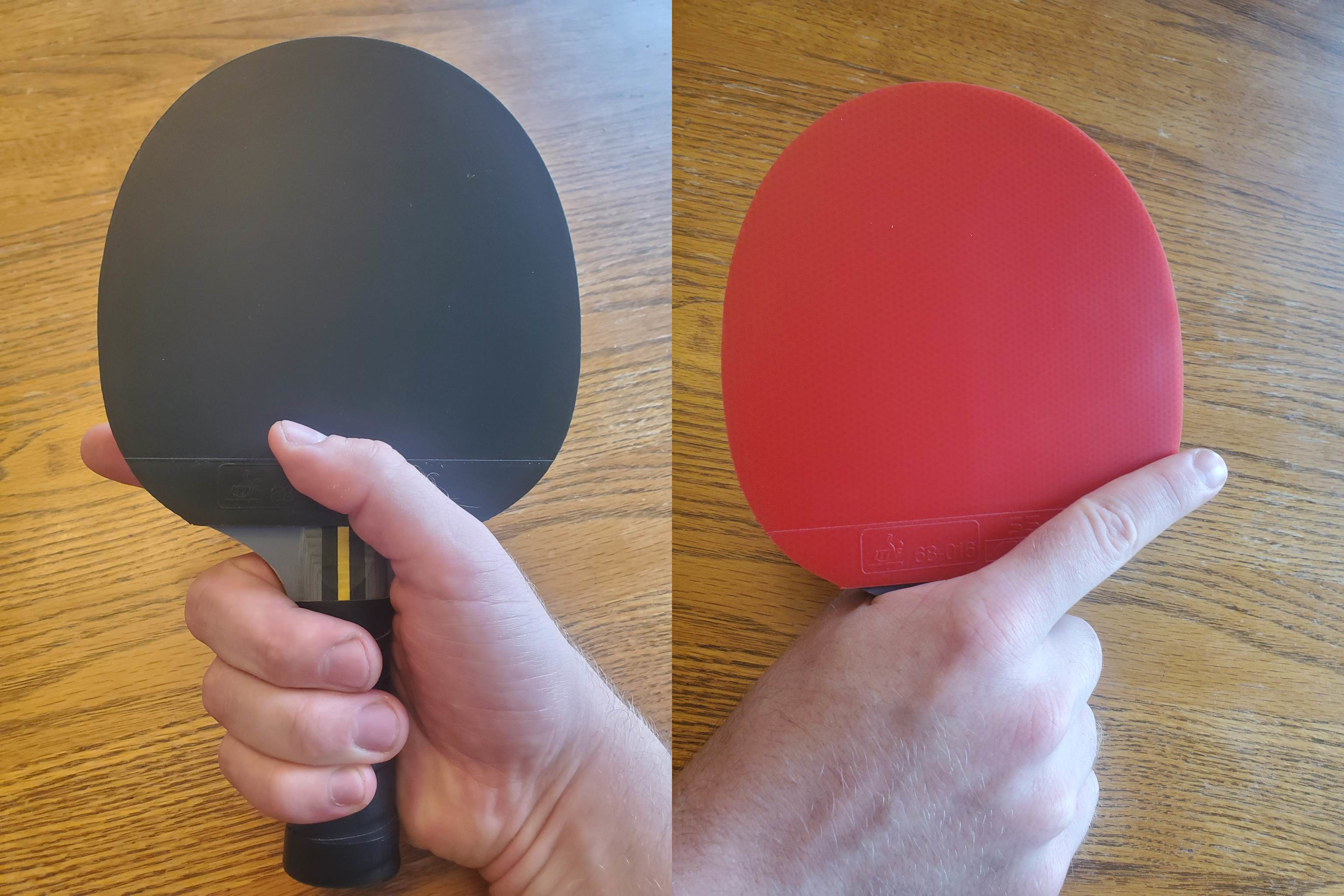
The forehand (black) and backhand (red) views of the Deep Shakehand grip

Shakehand is possibly the oldest surviving grip since the table tennis racket took its current shape. It is named because one holds the racket as if they are shaking hands with it: thumb on one side of the racket, index finger on the other side, and the remaining three fingers wrapped around the handle. This grip allows nearly even power distribution over forehand and backhand shots, but suffers from an awkward crossover point in the middle of the body, where the player must switch from forehand to backhand. This crossover point between the forehand and backhand is an area of weakness for shakehand players, but penhold players do not have such a crossover point because they can cover the middle of their body by simply swinging their forehand down like a pendulum. The main advantages of a shakehand grip are the ability to make fast topspin attacks on both the forehand and backhand sides, and the ability to create extremely spinny balls, particularly those with pure topspin and pure backspin.

Shallow Shakehand
This variation of shakehand involves placing the thumb on the handle. This favors topspin attacks and loops.
Deep Shakehand
This variation involves placing the thumb on the rubber. This allows for more precise shots and backspin.

Virtually all European players and roughly two thirds of Asian players use the shakehand grip.

=== Penhold grips ===
The penhold grips are named because of the similarity to the way that pens are held: with the thumb and index finger wrapped around the front side of the handle, and the remaining three fingers on the back of the blade. This is especially reflective of how traditional Chinese, Japanese and Korean calligraphy pens were held, where the grip is said to have originated. Penhold styles have one notable advantage over shakehand in that they do not have an awkward crossover point in the middle of the body. Penhold styles also allow around 270° of wrist mobility around the axis of the plane of the blade, making it much easier for penhold players to create both directions of sidespin as well as hybrid sidespin-topspin or sidespin-backspin shots. It is also easier for penhold players to disguise what kind of spin they are putting on the ball, as well as in which direction they are going to hit the ball. It is typically hard for penhold players to create pure topspin or pure backspin, as both their forehand and backhand strokes tend to hit the ball at a side-angle, so most of their shots will have some sidespin.

Penhold grip styles have become less popular in recent years, since it is hard and awkward to perform backhand topspins and backhand attacks, and the game has become much more attack-oriented as of late. The backhand weakness makes it much harder for penhold beginners to perform well against their shakehand counterparts, and so few stick with it to develop better technique. However, this has not stopped top penhold players from winning the World Championships, the World Cup and the Olympic Games regularly, as the backhand weakness can be covered adequately by putting in the effort to learn good backhand technique (as Ryu Seung-Min has), with excellent footwork allowing forehand coverage of most of the table (exemplified best by Ryu Seung-Min and Xu Xin), or by supplementing with the more modern Reverse Penhold Backhand innovation (exemplified best by Wang Hao).

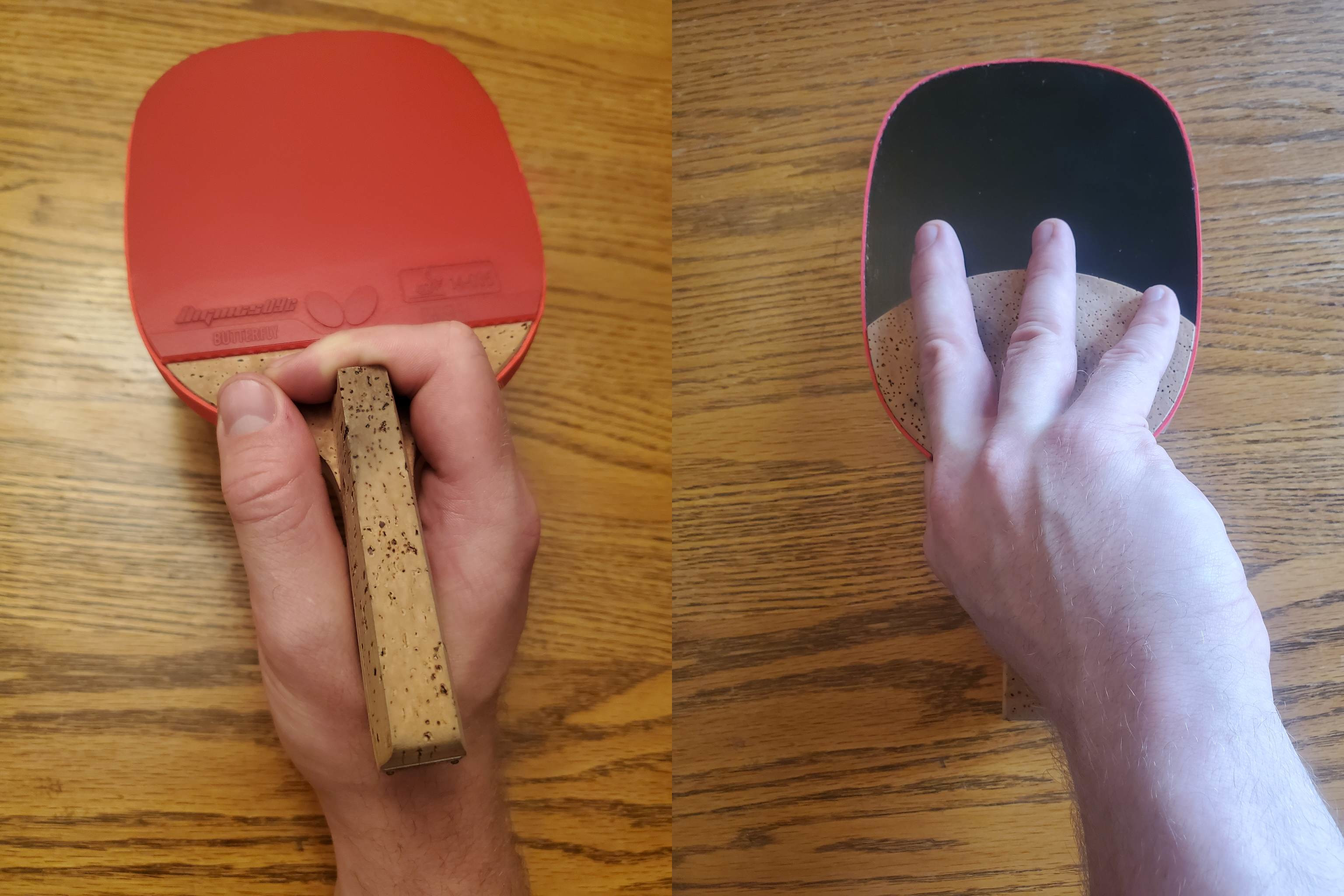
The forehand (red) and back side (black) view of a Japanese/Korean Penhold grip. The back side has no rubber and is not used for play, and so the fingers are extended over it for better feeling of the ball.

One-Sided Penhold
Called Traditional Penhold, recently called Traditional Chinese Penhold, Japanese Penhold or Korean Penhold, players who utilize the traditional penhold grip hit both forehand and backhand shots with only the forehand side of the racket, and usually don't even have rubber on the racket's back side. The rackets made for use with Japanese Penhold look quite different from most other rackets: they are usually square, made from a very thick single-ply piece of cypress wood, painted black on the back side, and with a large piece of cork protruding from the handle. Directional control of the racket in this grip is supported almost exclusively by the index finger, which hooks around the large piece of cork glued to the handle. Many Chinese Penhold users choose to use a shakehand racket with a shorter flared handle. The backhand stroke is achieved by swinging the forehand side of the racket down and around in an underhand position across the body, like an upside-down windshield wiper. This results in a backhand which is suitable for blocking and returning balls, but does not properly allow shoulder mechanics for fast attacks or producing topspin. While traditional penhold players often lack the ability to loop on the backhand side, many of them can partially make up for it with a powerful backhand punch. Although this grip impairs the backhand stroke, the forehand stroke with this grip is phenomenal: the grip aligns the racket with the hand and forearm, and as a result, the fastest shots in table tennis are made with the Japanese Penhold's forehand stroke. Many traditional penholders would argue that the exceptional forehand makes up for the weak backhand, and traditional penhold players typically avoid using the backhand by trying to cover the entire table with their forehand. This places a much higher demand on the player for athleticism -- specifically for explosive leg strength, fast footwork, coordination of footwork with arm strokes, and quick reaction times. Notable traditional penholders include Ryu Seung-Min, Kim Taek-Soo and Kaii Yoshida. It can be seen in recordings of their matches that all three of these players do quite a bit more footwork and coordinated body movement than their shakehand counterparts.

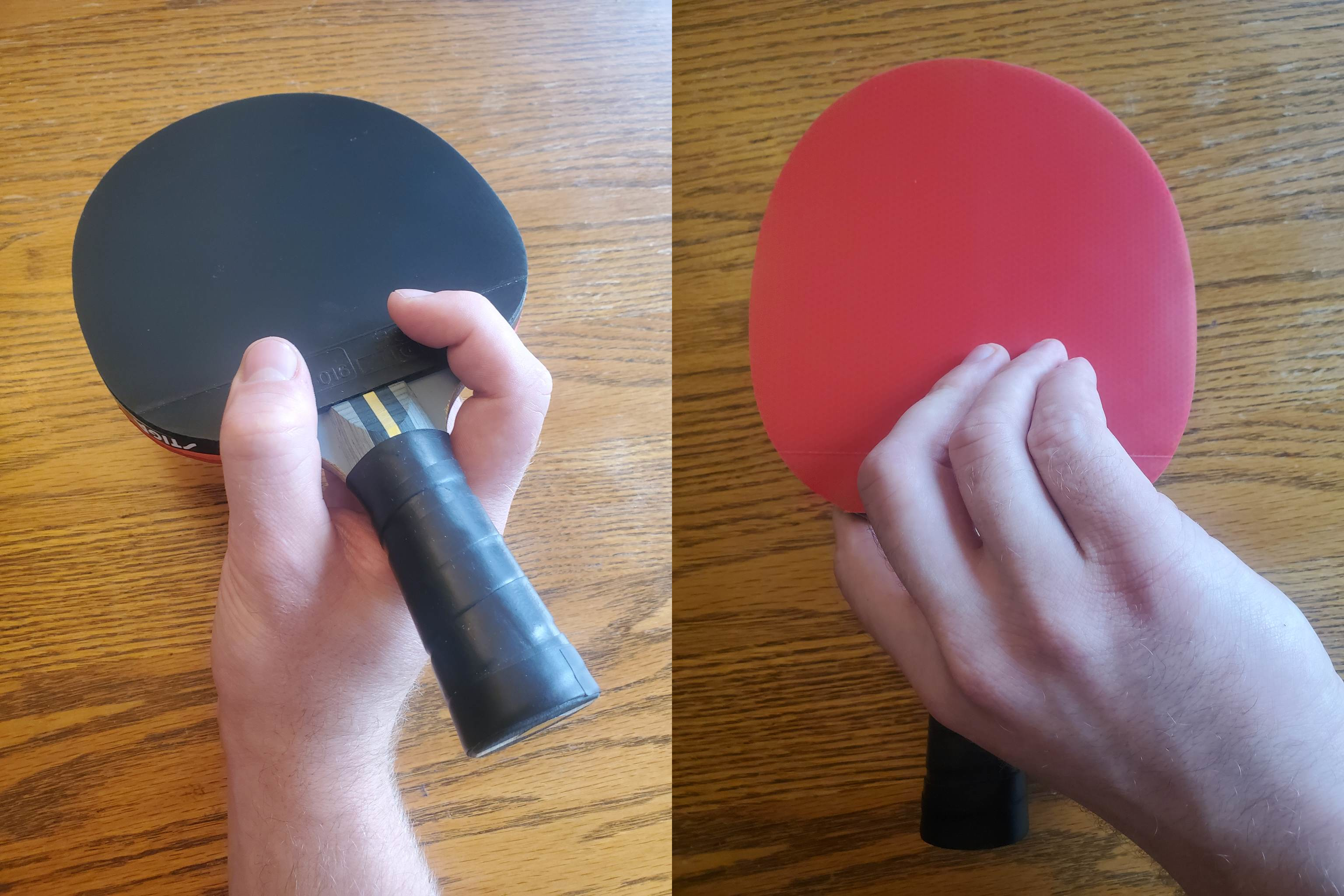
The forehand (black) and backhand (red) view of a Modern Chinese Penhold grip. The back side is used for gameplay, and so the fingers are curled to allow space to hit the ball.

Two-Sided Penhold
Also called Modern Penhold or currently, Modern Chinese Penhold, this was created due to a project the Chinese national team has undertaken recently. It was to teach its penhold players to use the underside of their rackets to hit backhand shots. This Reverse Penhold Backhand (RPB) solves the shoulder mechanics problem of the traditional penhold backhand, allowing easy looping and attacking shots. However, the gripping position one must employ to play the RPB is different from the traditional penhold grip: one must relax the index finger and bring it higher up on the racket, making more room for the thumb. Pressing with the thumb is what allows the forehand face of the racket to rotate inwards, letting the player hit the ball with the underside. This modified grip puts the wrist out of alignment with the rest of the arm, and thus results in a significantly weaker forehand when compared to the traditional grip. Chinese table tennis legend Liu Guoliang is usually credited with the invention and promotion of the RPB stroke, and as head coach of the Chinese team, he started training penholders to use this stroke. The first high-level player to truly master and popularize the RPB stroke is Wang Hao, who hits almost all of his backhand shots with the underside of his racket (with the exception of the short push when receiving a short serve). Other top-level Chinese penholders such as Ma Lin and Xu Xin primarily use the traditional penhold backhand when returning balls, but they keep rubber on the underside of their rackets in case a good opportunity for a RPB attack presents itself.

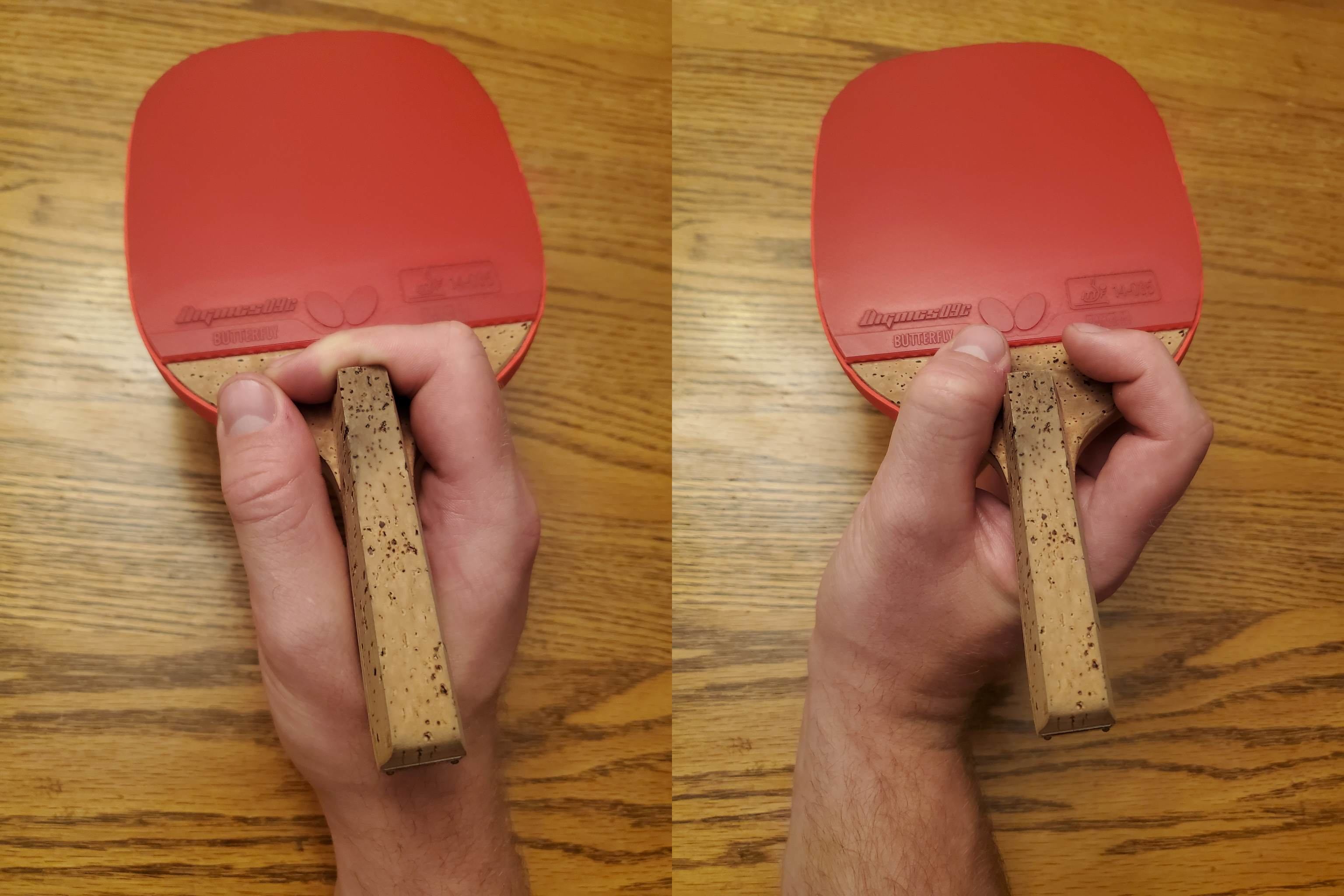
The contrasting thumb, forefinger, and wrist positions between the Traditional Penhold (left) and the Modern Chinese Penhold (right). Demonstrated on a racket built for Traditional Penhold grip.

Hybrid Penhold
This grip is most likely the most versatile of the Penhold Grips, as this merges the previous two, giving way for the blocking of Traditional Penhold and the looping of Modern Penhold. A famous player who uses this is Ma Lin.

=== Seemiller grip ===
This is a grip that was developed and popularized by Dan Seemiller, an American table tennis champion. This grip makes it awkward to hit shots using a standard handshake backhand using the opposite side of the racket. So, instead, Seemiller grip players hit their backhands with the same side of the racket as they use to hit their forehands, turning their wrists over the way a baseball player would to make a backhand catch, and typically blocking or counter-hitting the ball. Since they use only one side of their racket at a time, Seemiller grip players often put a rubber with very different playing characteristics on the other side of their bat, commonly a low-friction "anti-spin" rubber that they use to return spinny serves or to abruptly change the pace of the ball during a rally. Seemiller, in fact, is credited with inventing the combo bat, a racket with different types of rubber on each side. Also similar to the penhold, the Seemiller grip does not have a crossover point. Furthermore, the Seemiller grip allows for excellent feeling on blocks, as the fingers are much closer to the ball's point of contact than they are in the shakehand grip, and the wrist is in a much better position to angle downwards than it is in either of the penhold styles.

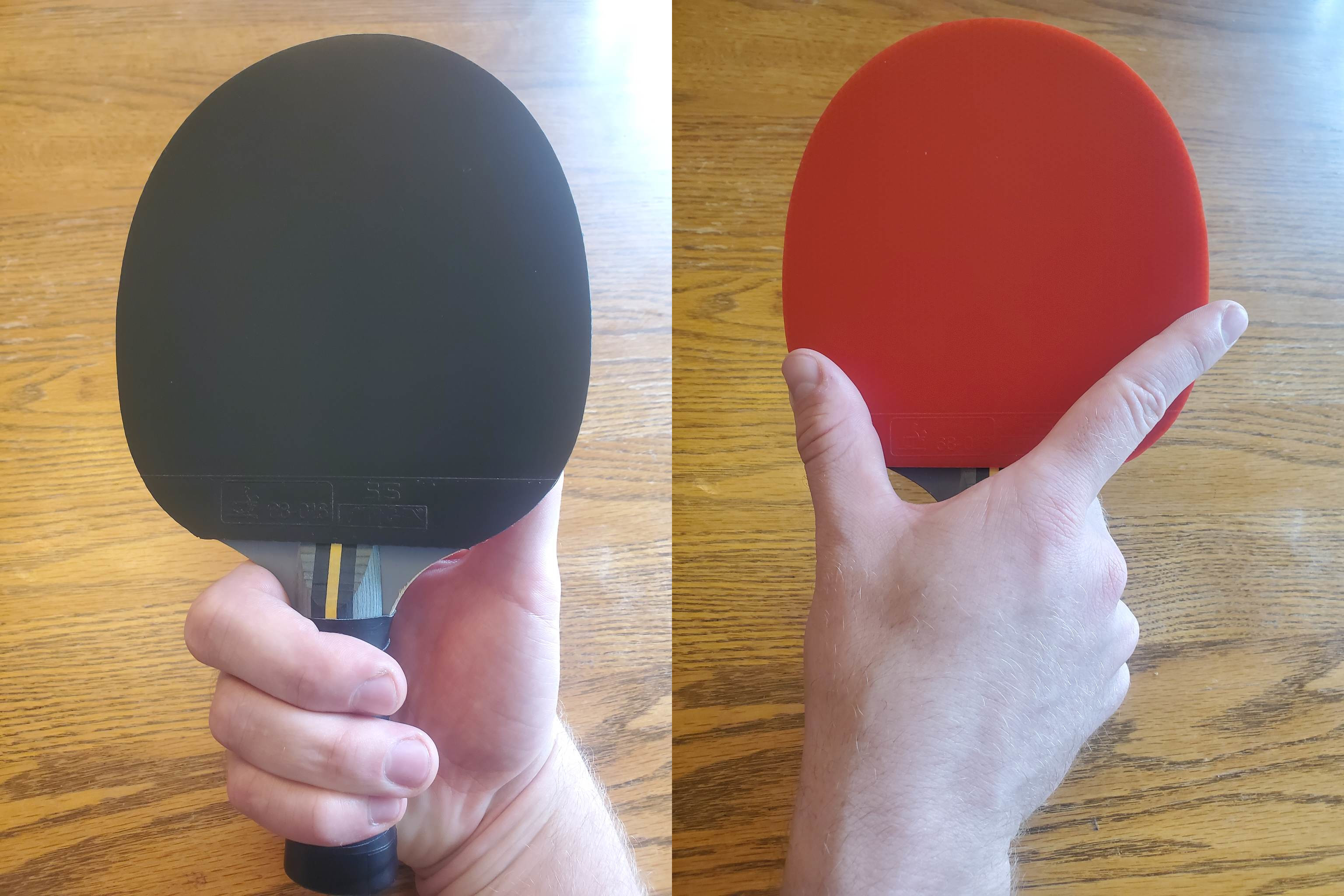
The forehand (black) and back side (red) view of the Seemiller (Ann Alvarez) grip. The back side is not used, though sometimes the player will flip the racket to use the other rubber on the forehand.

Ann Alvarez
Where the thumb and pointer are on the backside of the racket, allowing for a very stable (and powerful) backhand. However, the forehand of this racket is significantly weaker.

Windshield Wiper
An in-between of Shakehand and Seemiller, this grip is the standard Shakehand with the pointer finger running straight up the racket. This leads to an easy switch between this grip and Shakehand.

Danny Seemiller
Also called the Trigger Grip, this is the current playing grip of Dan Seemiller. It is the shallow Shakehand grip with the pointer finger wrapping around the racket, as if pressing on a trigger. This grip fixes the forehand problem it once had, making it much more powerful. Eric Boggan also uses this grip.

=== V-Grip ===
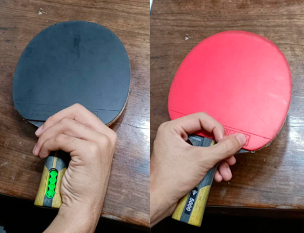
The forehand (red) and backhand (black) view of the Natural V-Grip. This is not the modified 'pistol' handle.

An experimental style being developed in China, it is held by forming a "V for victory" sign and gripping the blade between the forefinger and middle finger while having the other fingers rest under and on top of the handle. This grip produces a noticeable spin benefit due to the longer lever and mechanics utilized in the forehand and backhand (much like those found in the Western grip in tennis). The grip has not been successful at a high level of play.

Natural V-Grip
The normal grip used by the Chinese, it requires a modified handle shaped like a pistol to use this grip with ease. This creates a strong backhand. However, the forehand is hooked, leading to a weaker forehand.
Alessandro's V
Created by V-Grip pioneer Alessandro G., this involves placing the thumb over the index when gripping. The other three fingers are placed on the rubber on the back. Only the backhand side is used when blocking or looping, and the 'forehand' attack is akin to the penhold backhand; rotating your wrist to the other side. Like the Seemiller and Penhold, this variation of the V-Grip removes the point of indecision. This grip improves both offense and defense, and is considered as one of the more innovative grips of modern Table Tennis. The blade used for this is modified in which the handle is much shorter and hooks, giving a gripping spot where you can put your pointer finger on.

=== Unusual grips ===
Although the vast majority of table tennis players grip the racket in one of the four styles above, there are some outlier grips which are very rare.

W-Grip

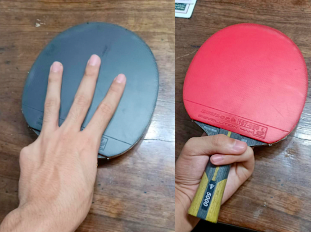
The forehand (red) and backhand (black) view of the W-Grip.

A variant of the Penhold grip, this is used via placing the thumb and little finger on the forehand side of the racket and the other three on the backside. This makes the backhand view look similar to a "W for winning" sign, hence the name. This grip significantly reduces your backhand, though forehand attacks maintain most of their power.
The Claw

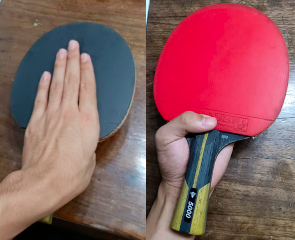
The forehand (red) and backhand (black) view of The Claw. Sometimes, the fingers in the back may be curled and allow use of the backhand side.

Dubbed this by Yuna Ojio, this is a variant of the Penhold grip. This involves using the thumb on the forehand side and the other four fingers on the back. This does reduce reach slightly, however forehand attacks with this grip are explosive.
Spider Grip

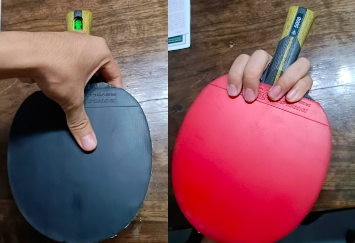
The forehand (red) and backhand (black) view of the Spider Grip. The backhand side is not in play, though you can backhand it as if you are using one-sided penhold.

This grip primarily focuses on backhand blocks, making it a great grip for blockers. To achieve this style, place your four fingers on the forehand side, with the handle separating the middle and ring fingers; have the thumb on the backhand. You cannot use the side with the thumb because the anatomy of the arm cripples this side.

== Penhold playing styles ==
=== Forehand looper ===
Penhold loopers utilize the forehand topspin loop as their primary shot. A loop is a topspin stroke in table tennis, usually performed with the forehand, where the player starts the stroke below the ball and brushes the ball upwards. A looper usually exhibits excellent footwork, trying to use the forehand to cover most or all of the table. Because of this, penhold loopers have a shorter reach than shakehand loopers and generally try to stay close to the table even during powerful loop exchanges.

Notable penhold loopers include 1981-83 World Champion Guo Yuehua, 1988 Olympic Gold Medalist Yoo Nam-kyu, 1992 Olympics Men's Doubles Gold Medalist Lü Lin, 1992 Olympics Bronze medalist Kim Taek-soo, 2001-03 World Men's Doubles Champion Yan Sen, 2004 Olympic Gold Medalist Ryu Seung-min, 2008 Olympic Gold Medalist Ma Lin, and 2015 Men's and Mixed Doubles Champion Xu Xin.

=== Two-sided looper ===
Two-sided penhold loopers almost exclusively play with the modern Chinese penhold style, where they use the Reverse Penhold Backhand to make powerful hybrid sidespin-topspin loops. RPB shots are often difficult to return because of the sidespin, and difficult to predict the direction of until the ball is already hit.

Traditional penhold players can be two-sided loopers, but the backhand loop is a very difficult shot, requiring lots of training and extreme shoulder flexibility. Ryu Seung-Min has a good backhand loop for a traditional penholder, but still very much favors his powerful forehand.

The most notable two-sided looper is Wang Hao, who uses the Reverse Penhold Backhand for almost all of his backhand shots. Other prominent two-sided penhold loopers are Félix Lebrun, Dang Qiu and Xue Fei.

=== Counter driver ===
The penholder's advantage of a small crossover is fully utilized in this style. Staying close to the table, counter drivers block and drive the opponent's topspins back across the table at speed, trying to force them out of position, abruptly change the pace of the game, or look for the opportunistic forehand kill. Counter drivers usually have a safe forehand loop as well, in case the opponent is a chopper and doesn't give topspins or easy kills readily. This style works well for short pips hitters.

Penhold counter drivers include Chiang Peng-lung and Moon Hyun-jung. Ma Lin also utilizes this strategy when the opponent lobs the ball far from the table.

=== Short pips hitter ===
This penhold style utilizes a short pips out rubber, usually on only one side of the racket with no backside rubber. Short pips hitters play over the table, hitting the ball very flatly as soon as it bounces off the table with the pips being largely unaffected by (or even negating) the majority of the opponent's spin. The advantage of hitting the ball flatly is that all of the player's power is transferred into the linear velocity of the ball, without expending any energy on creating spin. This means that the shots are very fast, and typically hard to block for the inexperienced player. However, the lack of a topspin Magnus effect means that the shots are harder to place on the table since they don't follow a downward arc trajectory, and the lack of angular momentum on the ball means that shots are less consistent and more sensitive to small amounts of wind or air pressure, often giving a knuckle ball effect.

Notable penhold short pips hitters include 1996 Olympic Champion Liu Guoliang, 1985 and 1987 World Champion Jiang Jialiang, three-time Olympian Toshio Tasaki, Yang Ying, Kwak Bang-bang, Seok Eun-mi, He Zhi Wen, Lee Eun-hee, Wang Zeng Yi and Rory Cargill.

== Shakehand playing styles ==
=== Forehand looper ===
Shakehand loopers apply pressure and win points primarily with fast and spinny loops from the forehand. After the opening exchanges, when the first attack has been made, loopers will attack with a variety of topspin shots varying in speed and spin, maneuvering their opponents around the table and looking for outright winners. The power and reach of a shakehand looper means that they can counterloop even when forced back from the table, which can be quite a spectacle when a lobbing looper forced back by smashes suddenly attacks in an attempt to regain initiative.

Notable shakehand loopers include Jean-Michel Saive, Werner Schlager, Wang Liqin, Ma Long, Zhang Jike, Ding Ning. Forehand looper is the most prominent style of play in men's table tennis, as it is a playing style that favors very powerful shots.

=== Double looper ===
Like a forehand looper, the two-sided attacker uses the loop as a primary weapon, though often from the backhand side. The advantage of the backhand attack is that it is often more controlled and precise than a forehand loop, and having a powerful backhand increases the chances of having the first attack as well as the variety of angles that could be attacked. Two-sided attackers often also employ a very fast and powerful backhand flick. They may even favor their backhand side over their forehand, but maintain a good forehand loop as well.

Notable male two-sided attackers include Dimitrij Ovtcharov, Fan Zhendong, Liang Jingkun, and Darko Jorgić. Two-sided attacker is the most prominent style of play in women's table tennis, since the women's game focuses more on precision and less on power, as compared to the men's game.

=== Counter-driver ===
The shakehand counter driver blocks and drives various attacks back at the opponent, forcing errors through changing angles and rhythm. A series of quick drives and blocks between counter drivers can look quite impressive, with balls seeming to fly everywhere. This style is popular among female players, since the relatively weaker attacks are easier to block compared to the men's game.

Notable counter-drivers include multiple-time Olympic champion Zhang Yining, as well as Fukuhara Ai, Tie Yana and He Zhuojia.

=== All-rounder ===
An all-round player is the closest thing modern table tennis has to a pure defensive player. Typically these players will have excellent reflexes for returning the ball, often from close to the table, and will use their defensive skills to place the ball in inconvenient locations for the opponent, or simply continue to return the ball until they find a good opportunity to attack. This playing style combines tactics from the counter-driver and the forehand looper.

Notable all-round players include Vladimir Samsonov, Oh Sang-eun, and Jan-Ove Waldner.

=== Chopper ===
The single most distinctive style in table tennis is the chopper. The chopper is defensive in the sense that, while other styles look to attack and gain initiative, the chopper gives up the initiative, using the chop to return an attack with backspin and/or sidespin. The chopper returns repeated attacks with slow, floating backspin chops executed as late as possible, taking as much time as necessary to tire out and frustrate the opponent. These chopped balls are often hard to return correctly because they have heavy backspin on them, and the slow floating returns make it necessary for the opponent to start the attack all over again. Chops can vary in the amount of backspin (from no spin to floating), sidespin (curving into the table or away from the attacker), and position, making it hard to continuously attack. Because chopped balls are hard to return well, they are often returned poorly and give the chopper a good opportunity to attack. Inverted rubber is usually employed on the forehand side of the racket, and the backhand is usually reserved for long pips rubber or antispin rubber, which is insensitive to spin (and sometimes even negates spin). The inverted rubber is used for attacking, and the long pips / antispin rubber is used for chopping. Some choppers twiddle their rackets in order to switch which side of the racket has pips, adding another layer of confusion for their opponent.

Notable twiddle-choppers include Koji Matsushita, Svetlana Ganina, Irina Kotikhina and Viktoria Pavlovich. Notable non-twiddle choppers include Chen Weixing, Joo Sae-Hyuk, Ding Song, Kim Kyung-ah, Park Mi-young and Tan Paey Fern. Very few players choose to defend with inverted rubber on both sides, a notable example of which is Wang Tingting.

Points between a chopper and an attacker are usually the easiest for non-players to appreciate, because of the slowness of the ball and the spectacular chop stroke.
