= Speed glue =

Treatment for table tennis rackets

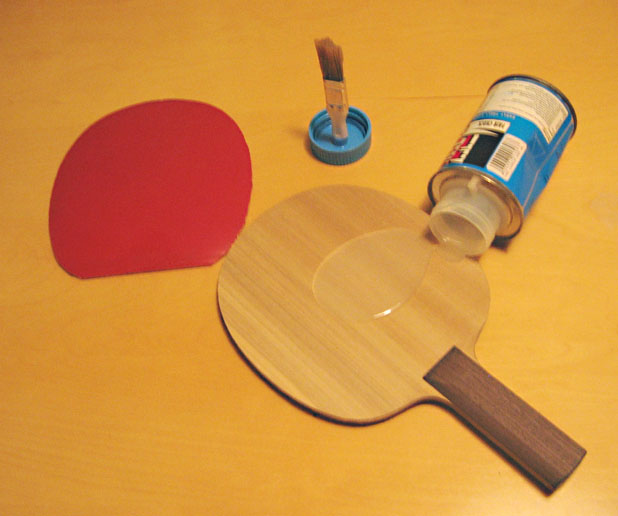
Speed glue is the solvent-based glue used to fix the rubber to the wooden racket just before a match.

In table tennis, speed glue is a glue that is used to glue rubber surfaces to the racket or paddle. Speed glue is usually applied around 30 minutes before a match starts. The use of speed glue has been found to increase the elasticity of the racket, which adds speed and spin to the ball.

Speed glue works by its solvent vapours which make the porous cells of soft rubber expand. This stretches the rubber giving it a tension that in turn makes the ball behave like an object meeting a trampoline.

It was discovered by accident in the 1970s when a player used bicycle puncture repair glue to fix his racket before a match. The difference in the play of the ball became immediately obvious. The high performance effect lasts only a few hours.

Table tennis player Dragutin Šurbek of Yugoslavia is given the major credit for popularising this use of speed glue between 1979 and 1983.

Speed glue was allowed for the last time in the 2008 Summer Olympics. From the 2012 Summer Olympics, speed glue is banned in the Olympics.

== Description ==
Speed glue is an adhesive used to assemble table tennis rackets in a manner to make them hit balls back with increased speed. It is optional; a person may choose to use regular glue instead. Its use in tournaments is currently disputed due to believed toxicity in some speed glues.

The theory behind speed glue is that it is soaked up by the sponge layer between the rubber topsheet and blade of a table tennis paddle. The sponge begins to expand, and consequently begins to stretch the attached rubber topsheet causing increased tension and creating a "trampoline" effect on the ball causing it to bounce back quicker.

Speed glue use is generally more common among advanced table tennis players. The increased speed of the strokes of the paddle is usually too great for beginners to handle. Professional players who use speed glue generally apply it to their paddle a few hours before their match because the effects of speed glue do not last long. The effects last usually 3–6 hours, although recently long life glues have been developed to prolong the effect for up to 4 days. Offensive players tend to use speed glue more than defensive players as they emphasise speed over spin and control. Generally, speed is inversely proportional to control, although this depends largely on ability.

Speed glue needs to be reapplied several times to have an optimal effect. The nature of speed glue is very unpredictable, so several coats are needed to make the bounce of the paddle more predictable. When professionals are seen applying speed glue to their paddles before a tournament, they have applied speed glue to it several times before that time. Softer sponge rubbers will gain a larger performance boost from speed glue than harder rubbers. The use of speed glue will, over time, degrade the quality of the rubber so persistent use will mean the rubbers will need to be replaced sooner.

Speed glue is mixed with certain solvents to create a better effect. Some of these solvents are illegal and contain potentially hazardous vapors. They are considered to be inhalants. In 1995, the International Table Tennis Federation (ITTF) banned the use of all halogenated solvents, all solvents with benzene rings, and N-hexane in paddles. They have also started the practice of random testing of paddles in international tournaments checking for the aforementioned solvents.

The amount of increase the glue will give a rubber is dependent on the sponge. Softer sponged rubber, e.g. Yasaka's MarkV 30, Butterfly's Bryce FX, Joola's Samba, will absorb the glue more readily and therefore have a bigger dome when they expand, leading to a greater effect, with harder sponges e.g. most Chinese rubbers, Butterfly's Bryce Hard, expanding less leading to a slightly lesser effect.

In gameplay terms, speed glue has some disadvantages. Due to the increased sponge thickness, speed does increase, but as mentioned before usually control decreases as speed increases. Also, after several regluings speed glue begins to build up on the racket, increasing the weight of the paddle. The sensitivity of table tennis blades is such that a few extra grams may cause the player to not perform as well. The more the glue builds up on the rubber, the more glue must be applied on the next application to achieve the same effect. After 5-10 layers of glue, some players peel the old glue off to reduce the weight of the sponge, and to reduce the amount of glue needed to obtain the optimum effect. Another disadvantage is that the increased tension on the sponge from the glue will cause the rubber to wear out faster than usual. In order to prolong the life of the rubber, some players remove the rubber from the blade after they play to allow the rubber to contract naturally, rather than remain stressed on the blade.

Spotting speed glue is very difficult at times. If the paddle makes a very distinctive high-pitched sound on contact, then the paddle may have speed glue. When holding the paddle, the person may notice a weight increase as compared to an untreated paddle. Also, there is a distinct smell that is given off from some speed glues when used.

== Regulation ==
In 2004, the ITTF decided to ban any glues containing volatile organic solvents as of 1 September 2007 due to health concerns. The date had been moved back to 1 September 2008.

This has spurred on a new line of products by table tennis manufacturers to innovate and develop water based speed glues and rubber sheets with speed glue effect built in that last the lifetime of the rubber. VOC glues are still allowed when done under regulated conditions i.e. at the manufacturer.

On 27 June 2007, the International Table Tennis Federation banned all speed glue containing "volatile compounds" effective immediately in response to an unconfirmed health incident in Japan.
