= Table tennis racket =

Equipment used in table tennis

A table tennis racket (also known as a paddle in North America or a bat in Europe and Asia) is the primary piece of equipment used by table tennis players. According to the International Table Tennis Federation (ITTF), the official term is "racket," and it is distinguished from other racket sports by its solid surface rather than an open frame strung with strings.

The racket consists of a laminated wooden blade which, depending on the player's grip and style, is covered with rubber on one or both sides. Modern construction varies significantly, ranging from traditional all-wood plies to advanced composite structures incorporating carbon fiber, glass fiber, or arylate. These materials and their specific arrangements directly influence the racket's performance characteristics, primarily categorized by speed, spin, and control. Consequently, players typically select a racket based on their individual skill level, ergonomic preference, and offensive or defensive tactical orientation.

== Blades ==
The blade is the wooden portion that serves as the foundation for the rubber. ITTF regulations mandate that at least 85% of the blade's thickness must be of natural wood. The remaining layers may be reinforced with fibrous materials such as carbon fiber or glass fiber, provided they do not exceed 7.5% of the total thickness or 0.35 mm, whichever is smaller.

=== Classification and speed ===
Blades are categorized by their performance characteristics, ranging from defensive to highly offensive. These ratings are determined by the "dwell time"—the duration the ball stays on the racket—and the "coefficient of restitution," which dictates the speed at which the ball rebounds.

- DEF (Defensive): Designed for maximum control and vibration dampening. They often feature a larger head size to increase the "sweet spot" for chopping and defensive play.
- ALL (All-around): Balanced blades that provide moderate speed, suitable for players who utilize a mix of offensive loops and defensive blocks.
- OFF (Offensive): Stiff, fast blades designed for high-velocity topspin and power-hitting. These are often sub-categorized (OFF-, OFF, OFF+) based on increasing rigidity.

=== Construction and materials ===
The feel of a blade is influenced by the number of plies (layers) and the specific wood species used:

- 5-Ply Wood: Typically thinner and more flexible, providing greater dwell time and feedback, which is advantageous for generating spin.
- 7-Ply Wood: Thicker and stiffer than 5-ply blades, offering more stability and power for flat-hitting and close-to-the-table counter-attacks.
- Carbon Composites: The inclusion of carbon layers increases the sweet spot and speed while reducing overall weight. However, it often reduces the tactile feedback (vibration) compared to all-wood constructions.

Common outer veneers include Limba for its softness and spin potential, Koto for a crisper and faster rebound, and Hinoki (Japanese Cypress) for its unique balance of softness and high speed.

=== Handle styles ===
Handle selection is primarily an ergonomic preference, though it can impact grip transitions during play:

- Flared (FL): The most common style, widening at the base to provide a secure grip during high-velocity swings.
- Straight (ST): Uniform in width, preferred by defensive players who frequently "twiddle" (rotate the racket) to use different rubbers on each side.
- Anatomic (AN): Contoured to fit the natural shape of the palm for a fuller grip.
- Penhold (PH): A shorter handle specifically designed for the Chinese or Japanese/Korean penhold grips.
- DEF (Defensive): Designed for maximum control and vibration dampening. They often feature a larger head size to increase the "sweet spot" for chopping and defensive play.
- ALL (All-around): Balanced blades that provide moderate speed, suitable for players who utilize a mix of offensive loops and defensive blocks.
- OFF (Offensive): Stiff, fast blades designed for high-velocity topspin and power-hitting. These are often sub-categorized (OFF-, OFF, OFF+) based on increasing rigidity.

== Assembly ==
Players have many options and variations in rubber sheets on their racket. Although a racket may be purchased assembled with rubber by the manufacturer, most serious tournament players will use a custom racket. A player selects a blank blade (i.e., a racket without rubber) based on their playing style. The type of wood or synthetic layers used to make up the blade will determine the blade's speed. The different types of rubber sheets affect the level of spin, speed, and other specific playing characteristics. Racket construction and new rubber technology contribute significantly to the amount of deviation from the expected ball flight path.

== Glues and gluing ==
Normally, a sheet of rubber is glued to a blade using table tennis brand glues such as STIGA, Butterfly, Donic, or DHS. Some glues may work even if they are not designed specifically for table tennis rackets, such as rubber cement and tear mender. The rubber is not removed until it wears out or becomes damaged. In the 1980s, some players developed a new technique with a special glue called speed glue to apply the rubber every time they played. The glue would help provide more spin and speed by providing a "catapult" effect. Speed glue and all other compounds containing high VOC content were allowed for the last time in the 2008 Summer Olympics and are currently disallowed by ITTF regulations.

== Maintenance and protection ==
The surface of a racket will develop a smooth glossy patina with use. The rubber surface needs regular cleaning to retain a high friction surface for ball spin. Commercial cleaners or water and soap can be cleaning agents.

== Color rules ==
Paddles were black on both sides until a 1986 rule change required the sides to be different colors. Prior to 2021, the rules of table tennis specified that one side of the paddle must be red and the other black. However, in 2021 the rules were officially amended so that blue, green, purple, or pink rubber could be used in place of the red one. Nevertheless, the other side must still be black.
