= David Foster (inventor) =

English inventor (1848-1928)

- Born: 1848; Kingston upon Hull, England
- Died: 1928 (aged 79–80); London, England

David Foster was an English inventor, best known for creating an early version of table tennis.

== Early life ==
Foster was born in Kingston upon Hull in 1848. Since a young age he had a keen interest in the grocery trade and his family links led him to move to Selby in North Yorkshire in the 1880s.

== Career ==
In 1890 while living in Selby, Foster, influenced by lawn tennis (which at the time was popular in a lot of back gardens), filed a patent for his new sport in England. His original table tennis set consisted of strung rackets, a cloth-covered rubber ball, large side nets along the table, and a wooden fence surrounding the table's perimeter. Despite James Devonshire having already made a patent in 1885, he ended up abandoning it, making Foster the official creator.

After living in Selby for almost 40 years, Foster moved to Streatham, London, where he died in 1928 at the age of 80.
