= Table tennis rubber =

Rubber used as covering on a table tennis racket

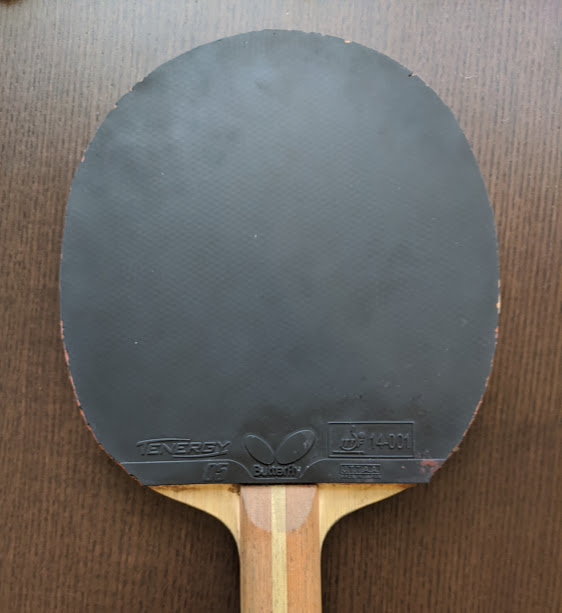
Tenergy 05, a popular brand of inverted rubber

Table tennis rubber is a type of rubber used as covering on a racket in table tennis. Modern table tennis rubber is usually composed of two layers: a layer of foam ("sponge") underneath and a layer of actual rubber on the surface. There are four common types of table tennis rubbers: short pips, long pips, antispin, and inverted. The thickness and density of the sponge layer underneath also affects how the rubber will handle the ball.

Because of the large variety of table tennis rubbers, there are a larger variety of playing styles in table tennis than in other racket sports.

== History ==
Rubber was first used in table tennis with the rise of hard racket paddles in the 1930s; the rubber consisted of short pimples over a wooden blade. In the 1950s, the sponge racket was introduced. It had a layer of foam underneath the layer of rubber. The foam helps provide more spin and speed. The International Table Tennis Federation (ITTF) regulated the thickness of the foam + rubber layer to a maximum of 4 mm (1/6 inch) thick, which has been the regulation in table tennis since.

Until 1986, players often had the same color of rubber on both sides of their paddle so that opponents could not tell which side of the paddle was being used. On July 1, 1986, two years before table tennis's introduction to the Olympics, the ITTF made it a rule that competition paddles had to have black rubber on one side and red rubber on the other side.

== Types of rubber ==
Table tennis rubber has four common types: inverted and short pips rubber are primarily offensive, while long pips and antispin are primarily defensive. The word "pip" refers to the usually conic-shaped raised bumps on top of the rubber in short and long pips rubber or the bumps on the inside attached to the foam on inverted or antispin rubber.

=== Inverted ===
Inverted rubber is an offensive rubber and the most popular type of rubber. They are smooth on the outside, leaving the pips on the inside touching the foam, which is why it is called inverted. Inverted rubber's wide variety of speeds and spins make it a favorite among players. Manufacturers will provide speed and spin ratings to differentiate their type of inverted rubber from others. The faster the speed rating, the harder it is to control.

==== Tensioned rubber ====
Before 2007, professional players often used speed glue on their inverted rubber to increase both speed and spin. After the ITTF banned speed glue due to health concerns, manufacturers have employed different methods to create inverted rubber with similar effects of speed glue. These new types of inverted rubber are called tensioned rubber, also called high tension, pre-tensed, or tensor rubber. They come in two types: mechanically tensioned rubber and chemically tensioned rubber The two types differ mainly in the manufacturing process; mechanically tensioned rubber is made by gluing the rubber topsheet in a vacuum to cause the rubber to expand, and chemically tensioned rubber soaks the bottom foam layer in chemicals that cause the same effect as speed glue on the foam, but lasts longer.

=== Short pips ===
Short pips rubber, also called pips out rubber, is a more controlled attack rubber that provides more speed but less spin to an attack than inverted rubber. Due to the small contact surface with the ball, short pips rubber is not easily affected by the opponent's spin; instead, it will knock a ball away. Therefore, the rubber is usually used for blocking, hitting, and counterattack strokes.

=== Long pips ===
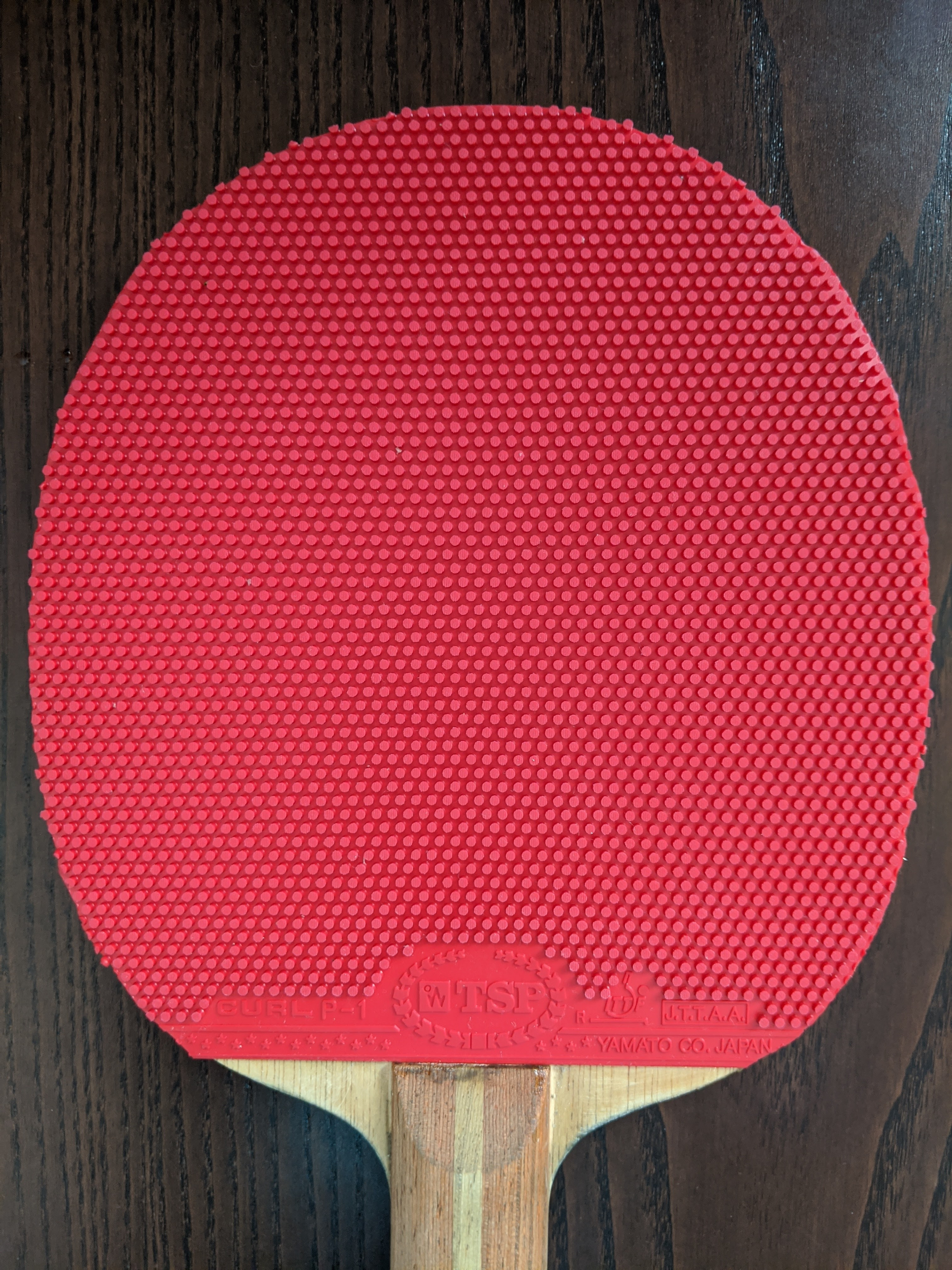
Long pips table tennis rubber

Long pips (or long pimples) is a specialized defensive rubber characterized by cylindrical "pips" that are significantly longer and thinner than those found on standard short-pips rubber. The defining feature of long pips is the high flexibility of these stalks; upon contact, the pips bend and buckle, creating a low-friction surface that prevents the rubber from "gripping" the ball.

==== Mechanics and "spin reversal" ====
Unlike inverted (smooth) rubber, which uses friction to change the ball's rotation, long pips largely preserve the ball's existing angular momentum. This leads to a phenomenon known as spin reversal:

- Against Topspin: When an opponent hits a heavy topspin shot, the ball arrives rotating "away" from the defender. Because the pips do not grip the ball to stop this rotation, the ball leaves the paddle with that same rotation intact—which, from the opponent’s perspective, returns as backspin.
- Against Backspin: Conversely, an opponent’s backspin is returned as topspin.

To a bystander, the spin direction in space does not actually change; it simply continues rotating in its original direction. However, to the players, the effect is deceptive because a standard defensive stroke (such as a "chop") produces a completely different spin profile than it would with traditional rubber.

==== OX vs. Sponge ====
Long pips are generally available in two configurations: OX (no sponge) or with a layer of sponge of varying thicknesses. The choice between the two significantly alters the playing characteristics and the degree of spin reversal.

- OX (Orthodox): This version consists of the rubber topsheet glued directly to the blade. OX pips are preferred by close-to-the-table blockers because they provide the maximum possible spin reversal and a "braking" effect that slows down the ball. The lack of sponge results in a lower, shorter trajectory and more pronounced "wobbling" or "sinking" effects, which can be highly disruptive to the opponent's rhythm.
- Sponge: Adding a sponge layer (typically ranging from 0.5 mm to 1.5 mm) increases the speed and allows the defender to play more actively. While a thicker sponge reduces the raw spin reversal, it provides better control for "chopping" far from the table, as the sponge absorbs some of the ball's energy and allows the player to add their own variation to the stroke.

==== The "frictionless" ban ====
In the early 2000s, several manufacturers produced "frictionless" long pips. These rubbers featured a hard, glass-like coating with near-zero friction, allowing for nearly 100% spin preservation and unpredictable "wobble" effects with minimal player effort.

Following concerns that these rubbers reduced the game's reliance on player skill, the International Table Tennis Federation (ITTF) implemented a mandatory minimum friction level for all approved rubbers. Effective July 1, 2008, all racket coverings must maintain a minimum coefficient of friction of 25 mN. This ruling effectively banned frictionless pips, requiring modern long-pips players to use more active techniques to generate significant spin reversal. The use of "treated" pips—rubbers chemically or thermally altered to reduce friction—remains strictly prohibited in sanctioned competition.

=== Antispin ===
Antispin rubber is a defensive rubber with a smooth surface and very soft sponge. Due to the soft sponge, this rubber dampens the speed of the ball and returns the ball at a low speed. It is usually used by defensive players on one side of their racket only. Unlike inverted rubber, it does not grip the ball, so opponents' balls are returned with little spin. However, against heavy spin, antispin rubber will return the ball with an opposite spin, similar to long pips.

=== Other rubbers ===
==== Medium pips ====
Medium pips rubber is a mainly offensive rubber with pips out like the long and short pips rubber. It is more attack-oriented and has less spin than the long pips rubber, but is not as offensive as the short pips rubber.

=== Hardbat (Short pips OX) ===
Hardbat refers to a classic style of table tennis that uses paddles covered only with short-pips rubber and no sponge layer (OX). This was the standard equipment used during the "Classic Age" of table tennis in the 1930s and 1940s before the invention of sandwich (sponge) rubber.

Unlike modern inverted or sponge-backed pips, hardbat rubber offers very little spin and speed. The lack of sponge means the ball spends less time on the paddle, resulting in a "pop" sound upon impact and a very direct, straight forward trajectory. In modern competition, hardbat is often played in specialized "classic" tournaments where all players use identical or regulated non-sponge equipment to emphasize tactical placement and endurance over raw power and heavy topspin.

== Sponge thickness and density ==
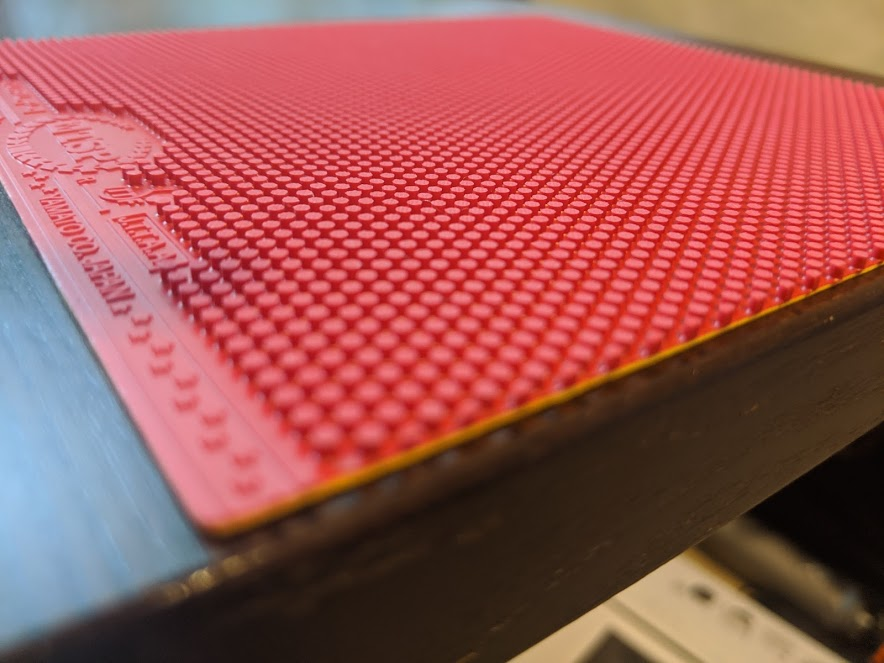
0.5–0.7 mm sponge thickness

The thickness of the sponge and the density of the sponge layer underneath the rubber also affects the handling of the ball. These affect inverted and antispin rubbers the most, because they rely on sponge for spin and speed more than short and long pips rubber.

=== Thickness ===
Sponge thickness affects the overall rubber speed and control. As a rule of thumb, the thinner the sponge, the more control you have, and the thicker the sponge, the faster it is. Rubbers labeled MX or MAX, short for maximum, have the maximum amount of sponge under the rubber without going over the ITTF regulation of 4.0 mm (1/6 inch). Rubbers labeled OX, short for orthodox, have no sponge beneath the rubber. Usually, inverted and antispin rubber have a larger foam thickness while pip rubber have a smaller thickness.

=== Density ===
Sponge density, also called sponge hardness, affects the over rubber spin. As a rule of thumb, a lower density sponge, will have more spin at lower speeds, while a higher sponge density will have more spin at higher speeds. The sponge density affects antispin rubbers the most, for they rely on a soft sponge and a hard rubber surface to reverse spin.

== Picking the right rubber ==
Choosing the right table tennis rubber can be a complex process due to the various factors players must consider, such as playing style, speed, spin, and control. Traditionally, players often seek professional advice by visiting specialized table tennis shops, where experts can guide them through the selection process. These shops offer a hands-on experience and tailored advice, which is invaluable for both novice and experienced players.
