= Table tennis =

Racket sport

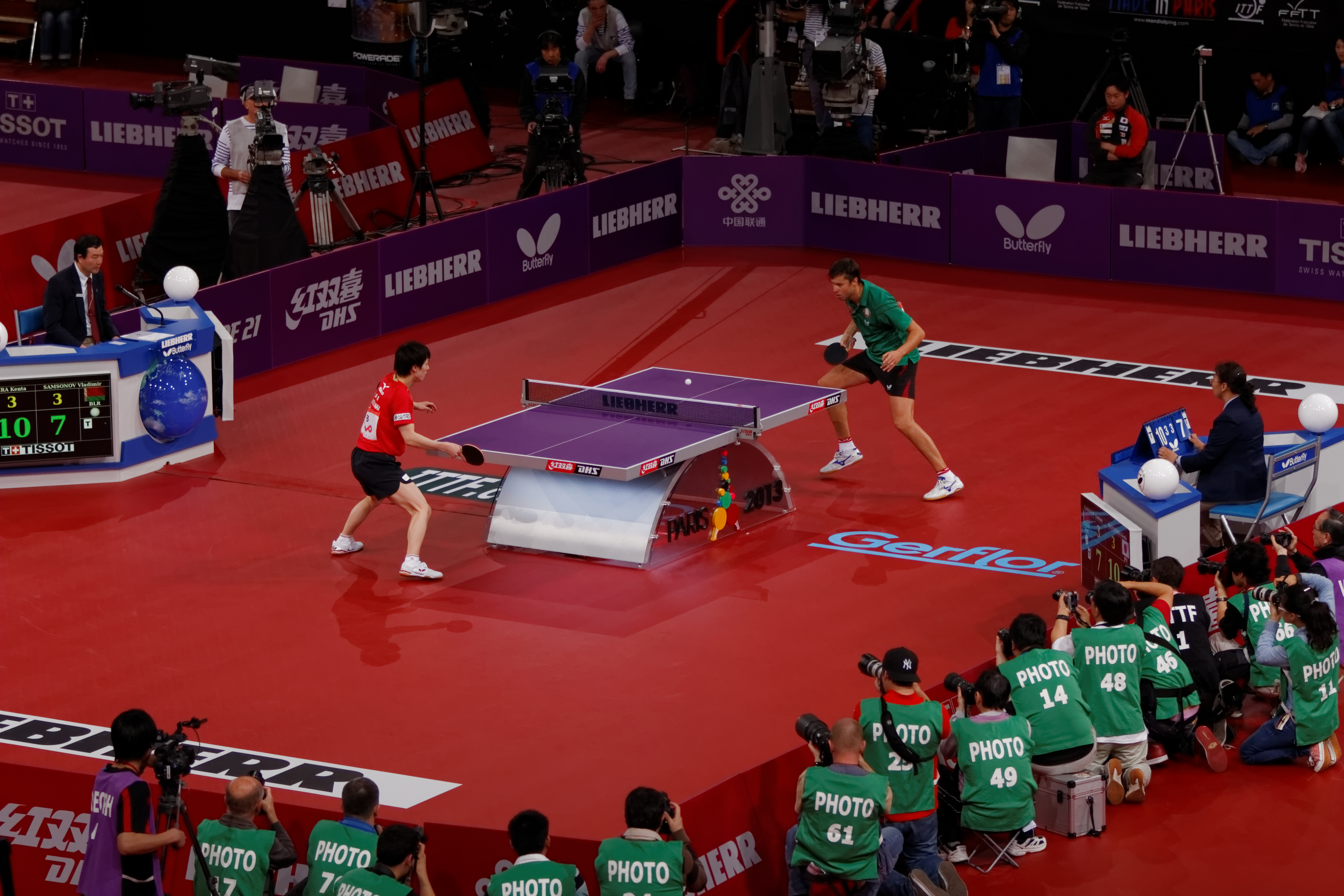
- Table tennis at Liga Pro
- Highest governing body: ITTF
- First played: 19th century, England

Characteristics
- Contact: No
- Team members: Singles or doubles
- Type: Racquet sport, indoor
- Equipment: Poly, 40 mm (1.57 in), 2.7 g (0.095 oz)
- Glossary: Glossary of table tennis

Presence
- Olympic: Since 1988
- Paralympic: Since inaugural 1960 Summer Paralympics

Table tennis (also known as ping-pong) is a racket sport derived from tennis but distinguished by its playing surface being atop a stationary table, rather than the court on which players stand. Either individually or in teams of two, players take alternating turns returning a light, hollow ball over the table's net onto the opposing half of the court using small rackets until they fail to do so, which then results in a point for the opponent. Play is fast, requiring quick-fired reactions and constant attention, and is characterized by an emphasis on spin, which can affect the ball's trajectory more than in other ball sports.

Owed to its small minimum playing area, its ability to be played indoors in all climates, and relative accessibility of equipment, table tennis is enjoyed worldwide not just as a competitive sport, but as a common recreational pastime among players of all levels and ages.

Table tennis has been an Olympic sport since 1988, with event categories in both men's and women's singles, and men's and women's teams since replacing doubles in 2008.

Table tennis is governed by the International Table Tennis Federation (ITTF), founded in 1926, and specifies the official rules in the ITTF handbook. ITTF currently includes 226 member associations worldwide.

== History ==
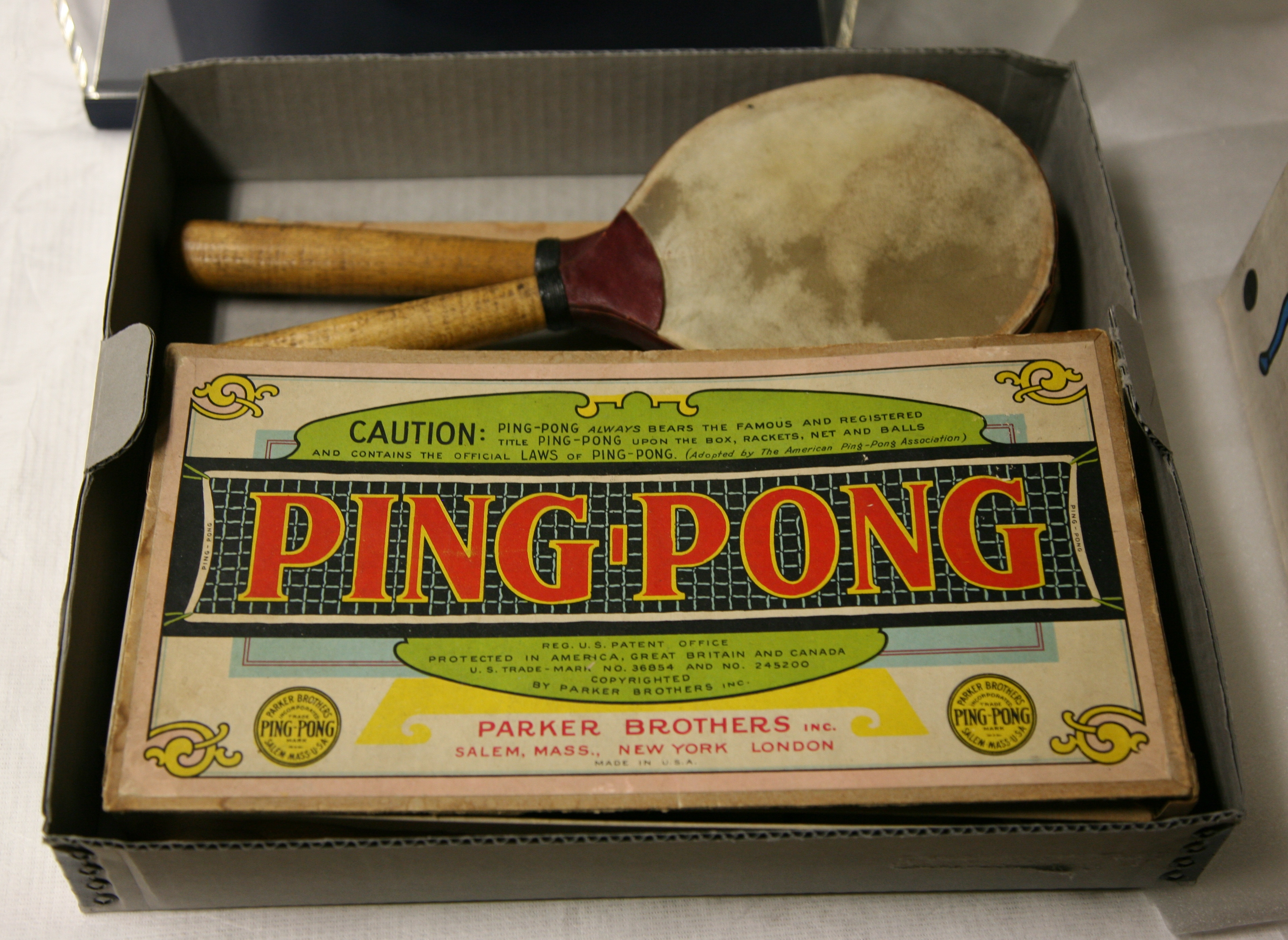
Parker Brothers Ping-Pong game

The sport originated in Victorian England, where it was played among the upper-class as an after-dinner parlour game. It has been suggested that makeshift versions of the game were developed by British military officers in India around the 1860s or 1870s, who brought it back with them. A row of books stood upright along the centre of the table as a net, two more books served as rackets and were used to continuously hit a golf-ball. In 1883, British sporting goods company Slazenger filed a patent for a net for table tennis. The invention is also attributed to David Foster in 1890.

The onomatopoeia "ping-pong" imitates the sound of the game. The name was in wide use before British manufacturer J. Jaques & Son Ltd trademarked it in 1901. The name "ping-pong" then came to describe the game played using the rather expensive Jaques's equipment, with other manufacturers calling it table tennis. A similar situation arose in the United States, where Jaques sold the rights to the "ping-pong" name to Parker Brothers. Parker Brothers then enforced its trademark for the term in the 1920s, making the various associations change their names to "table tennis" instead of the more common, but trademarked, term. The U.S. trademark for "Ping-Pong" is currently owned by Indian Industries, Inc. d/b/a Escalade Sports.

The next major innovation was by James W. Gibb, a British table tennis enthusiast, who discovered novelty celluloid balls on a trip to the US in 1901 and found them ideal for the game. This was followed by E.C. Goode who, in 1901, invented the modern version of the racket by fixing a sheet of pimpled, or stippled, rubber to the wooden blade. Table tennis was growing in popularity by 1901 to the extent that tournaments were being organized, books were being written on the subject, and an unofficial world championship was held in 1902. In those early days, the scoring system was the same as in lawn tennis.

Although both a "Table Tennis Association" and a "Ping Pong Association" existed by 1910, a new Table Tennis Association was founded in 1921, and renamed the English Table Tennis Association in 1926. The International Table Tennis Federation (ITTF) followed in 1926. London hosted the first official World Championships in 1926. In 1933, the United States Table Tennis Association, now called USA Table Tennis, was formed.

In the 1930s, Edgar Snow commented in Red Star Over China that the Communist forces in the Chinese Civil War had a "passion for the English game of table tennis" which he found "bizarre". On the other hand, the popularity of the sport waned in the 1930s Soviet Union, partly because of the promotion of team and military sports, and partly because of a theory that the game had adverse health effects.

In the 1950s, paddles that used a rubber sheet combined with an underlying sponge layer changed the game dramatically, introducing greater spin and speed. These were introduced to Britain by sports goods manufacturer S.W. Hancock Ltd. The use of speed glue beginning in the mid-1980s increased the spin and speed even further, resulting in changes to the equipment to "slow the game down". Table tennis was introduced as an Olympic sport at the Olympics in 1988.

== Rules and regulations ==
The official rules and regulations are specified in the ITTF handbook, which was first published in 1927. The current (fiftieth) version was published in 2022.

=== Rule changes ===
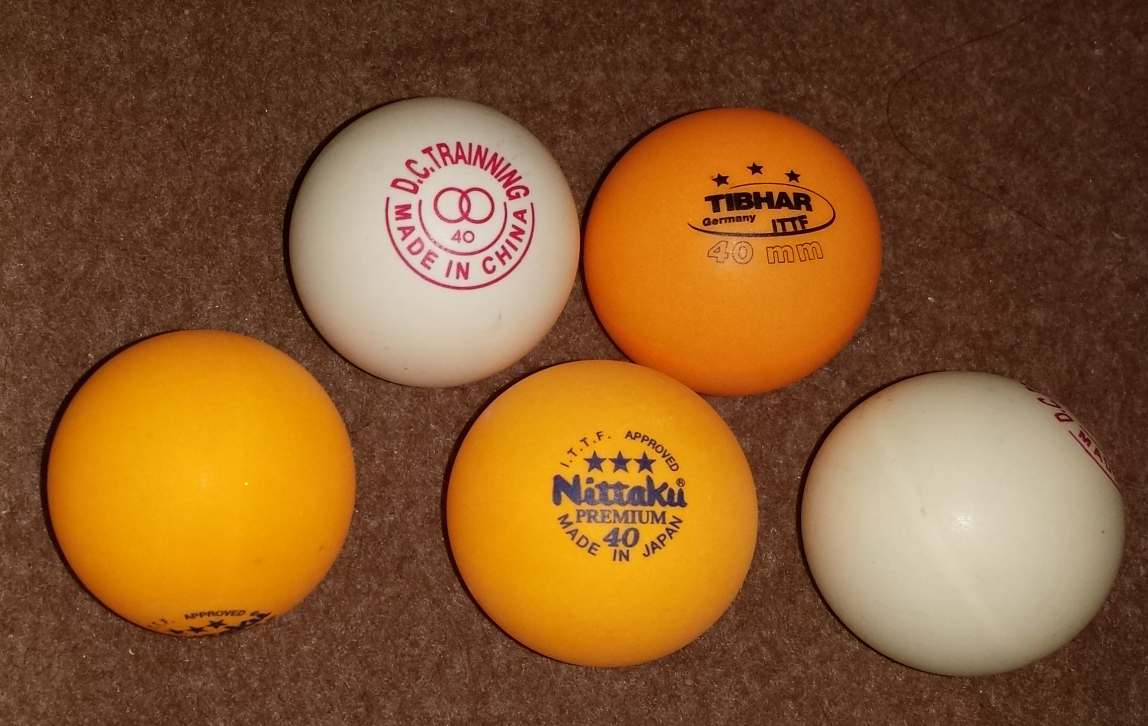
Assortment of 40 mm table tennis balls

After the 2000 Olympics in Sydney, the ITTF instituted several rule changes that were aimed at making table tennis more viable as a televised spectator sport. First, the older 38 mm (1.50 in) balls were officially replaced by 40 mm (1.57 in) balls in October 2000. This increased the ball's air resistance and effectively slowed down the game. By that time, players had begun increasing the thickness of the fast sponge layer on their paddles, which made the game excessively fast and difficult to watch on television. A few months later, the ITTF changed from a 21-point to an 11-point scoring system (and the serve rotation was reduced from five points to two), effective in September 2001. This was intended to make games more fast-paced and exciting. The ITTF also changed the rules on service to prevent a player from hiding the ball during service, in order to increase the average length of rallies and to reduce the server's advantage, effective in 2002. For the opponent to have time to realize a serve is taking place, the ball must be tossed a minimum of 16 centimetres (6.3 in) in the air. The ITTF states that all events after July 2014 are played with a new poly material ball.

== Equipment ==
=== Ball ===
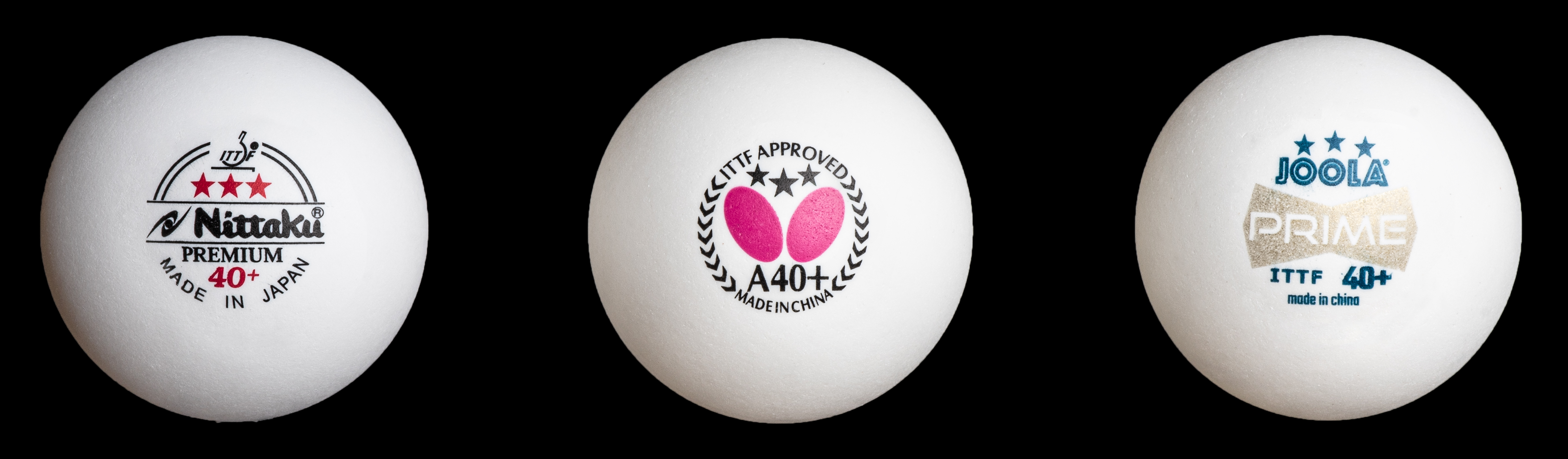
Table Tennis Plastic Balls 40+ mm with ITTF approval

The international rules specify that the game is played with a sphere having a mass of 2.7 grams (0.095 oz) and a diameter of 40 millimetres (1.57 in). The rules say that the ball shall bounce up 24–26 cm (9.4–10.2 in) when dropped from a height of 30.5 cm (12.0 in) onto a standard steel block thereby having a coefficient of restitution of 0.89 to 0.92. As of 2015, balls are now made of a polymer instead of celluloid, coloured white or orange, with a matte finish. The choice of ball colour is made according to the table colour and its surroundings. For example, a white ball is easier to see on a green or blue table than it is on a grey table. Manufacturers often indicate the quality of the ball with a star rating system, usually from one to three, three being the highest grade. As this system is not standard across manufacturers, the only way a ball may be used in official competition is upon ITTF approval (the ITTF approval can be seen printed on the ball).

The 40 mm ball was introduced after the end of the 2000 Summer Olympics; previously a 38 mm ball was standard. This created some controversies. Vladimir Samsonov, the World No. 1 table tennis professional at the time, threatened to pull out of the World Cup, which was scheduled to debut the new regulation ball on 12 October 2000.

=== Table ===
Diagram of a table tennis table showing the official dimensions

The table is 2.74 m (9.0 ft) long, 1.525 m (5.0 ft) wide, and 76 cm (2.5 ft) high with any continuous material so long as the table yields a uniform bounce of about 23 cm (9.1 in) when a standard ball is dropped onto it from a height of 30 cm (11.8 in), or about 77%. The table or playing surface is uniformly dark coloured and matte, divided into two halves by a net at 15.25 cm (6.0 in) in height. The ITTF approves only wooden tables or their derivates. Concrete tables with a steel net or a solid concrete partition are sometimes available in outside public spaces, such as parks.

=== Playing area ===
ITTF regulations require a playing space of at least 14 m (45.9 ft) long by 7 m (23.0 ft) wide, and a height clearance of at least 5 m (16.4 ft). For wheelchair events, the minimums are 8 m (26.2 ft) long and 6 m (19.7 ft) wide.

=== Racket ===
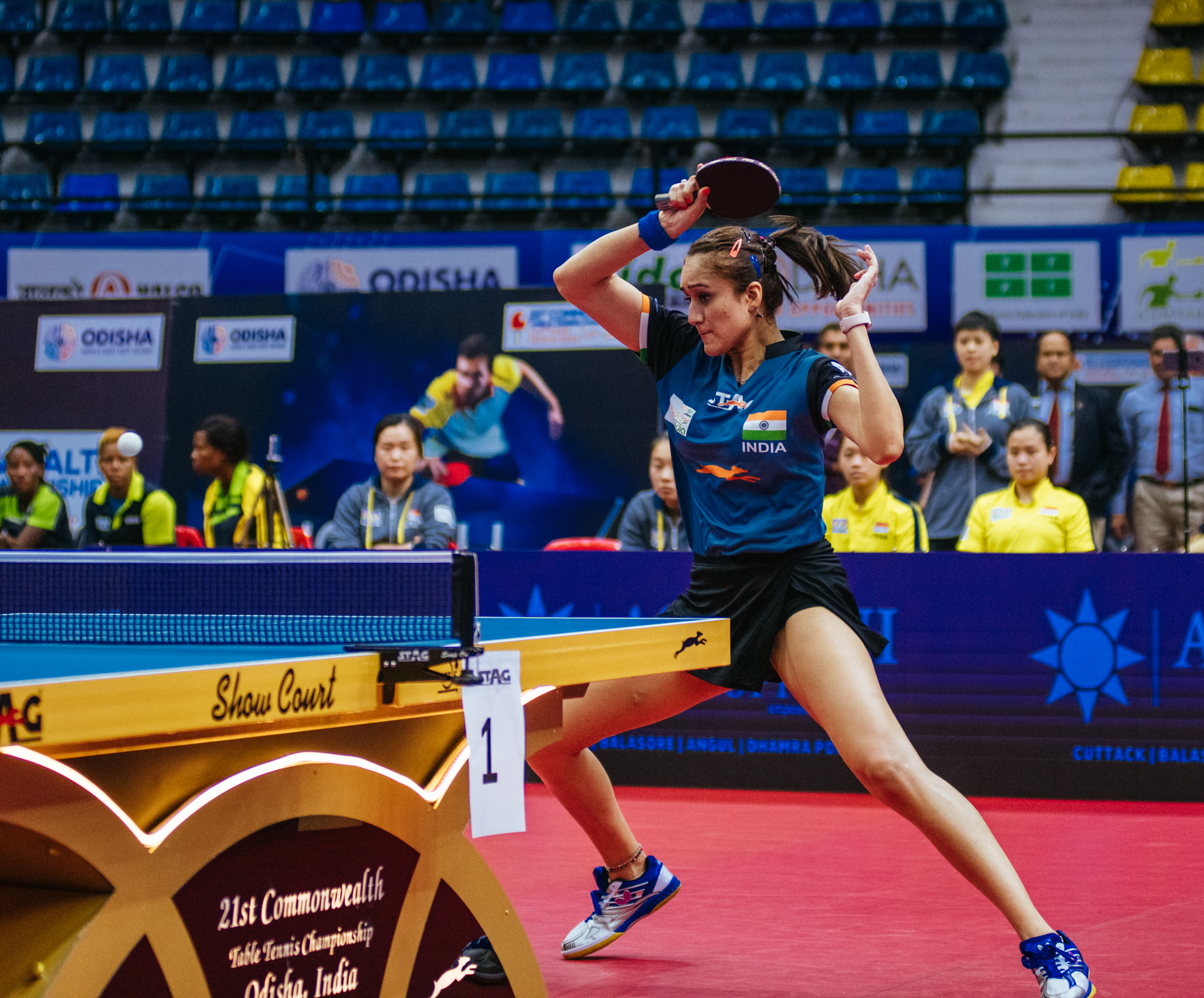
India's Manika Batra hits the ball. She specialises in playing long-pimples on her backhand, a rubber which is not often played by top players.

Players are equipped with a laminated wooden racket covered with rubber on one or two sides depending on the grip of the player. The ITTF uses the term "racket", though "bat" is common in Britain, and "paddle" in the U.S. and Canada.

The wooden portion of the racket, often referred to as the "blade", commonly features anywhere between one and seven plies of wood, though cork, glass fiber, carbon fiber, aluminum fiber, and Kevlar are sometimes used. According to the ITTF regulations, at least 85% of the blade by thickness shall be of natural wood. Common wood types include balsa, limba, cypress, and hinoki, which is popular in Japan. The average size of the blade is about 17 centimetres (6.7 in) long and 15 centimetres (5.9 in) wide. Although the official restrictions only focus on the flatness and rigidity of the blade itself, these dimensions are optimal for most play styles.

Table tennis regulations allow different rubber surfaces on each side of the racket. Various types of surfaces provide various levels of spin or speed, and in some cases they nullify spin. For example, a player may have a rubber that provides much spin on one side of their racket, and one that provides no spin on the other. By flipping the racket in play, different types of returns are possible. To help a player distinguish between the rubber used by their opposing player, international rules specify that one side must be black while the other side must be a bright colour clearly distinguishable from black and from the colour of the ball. The player has the right to inspect their opponent's racket before a match to see the type of rubber used and what colour it is. Despite high-speed play and rapid exchanges, a player can see clearly what side of the racket was used to hit the ball. Current rules state that, unless damaged in play, the racket cannot be exchanged for another racket at any time during a match.

In October 2021, the ITTF updated its regulations regarding the colours of rubbers on table-tennis rackets. As of 1 October 2021, one side of the racket must remain matte black, while the other side may one of five bright colours: red (as was previously allowed), blue, green, pink, or violet.

== Gameplay ==
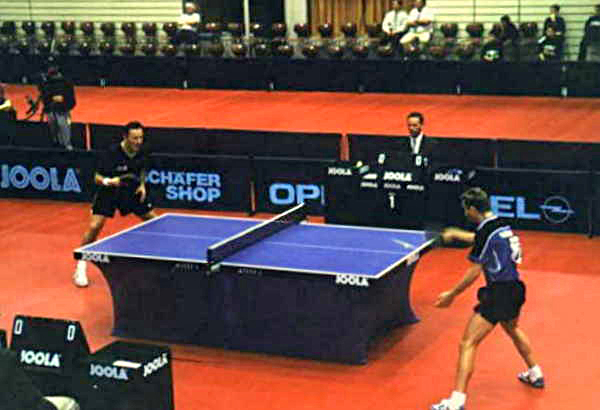
Competitive table tennis

=== Starting a game ===
According to ITTF rule 2.13.1, the first service is decided by lot, normally a coin toss. It is also common for one player (or the umpire/scorer) to hide the ball in one or the other hand, usually hidden under the table, allowing the other player to guess which hand the ball is in. The correct or incorrect guess gives the "winner" the option to choose to serve, receive, or to choose which side of the table to use. (A common but non-sanctioned method is for the players to play the ball back and forth three times and then play out the point. This is commonly referred to as "serve to play", "rally to serve", "play for serve", or "volley for serve". Another common method is referred to as "Ping for serve" or "Pinging for serve" where players will begin playing by hitting or bouncing the ball and playing a rally spelling out the word ping P-I-N-G with each hit then playing out the point for service).

=== Service and return ===
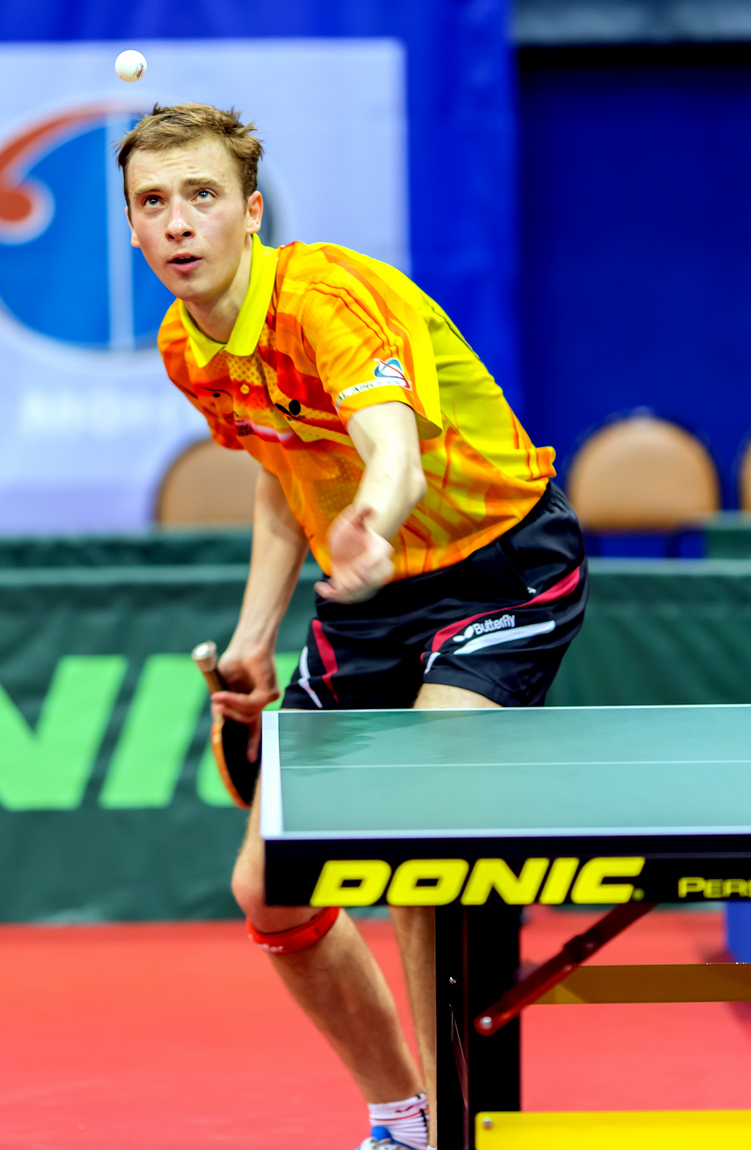
Service by professional Russian player Alexander Shibaev

In game play, the player serving the ball commences a play. The server first stands with the ball held on the open palm of the hand not carrying the paddle, called the freehand, and tosses the ball directly upward without spin, at least 16 cm (6.3 in) high. The server then strikes the ball with the racket on the ball's descent so that it first touches the server's court, and then touches directly the receiver's court, without touching the net assembly. In casual games, many players do not toss the ball upward; however, this is technically illegal and can give the serving player an unfair advantage.

The ball must remain behind the endline and above the playing surface of the table at all times during the service. The server's body or clothing cannot be used to obstruct sight of the ball; the opponent and the umpire must have a clear view of the ball at all times. If the umpire is doubtful of the legality of a service they may first interrupt play and give a warning to the server. If the serve is a clear failure or is doubted again by the umpire after the warning, the receiver scores a point.

If the service is "good", then the receiver must make a "good" return by hitting the ball back before it bounces a second time on receiver's side of the table so that the ball passes the net and touches the opponent's court, either directly or after touching the net assembly. Thereafter, the server and receiver must alternately make a return until the rally is over. Returning the serve is one of the most difficult parts of the game, as the server's first move is often the least predictable and thus most advantageous shot due to the numerous spin and speed choices at the server's disposal.

=== Let ===
A let is a rally of which the result is not scored, and is called in the following circumstances:

- The ball touches the net in service, provided the service is otherwise correct or the ball is obstructed by the player on the receiving side. Obstruction means a player touches the ball when it is above or traveling towards the playing surface, not having touched the player's court since last being struck by the player.
- When the player on the receiving side is not ready and the service is delivered.
- Player's failure to make a service or a return or to comply with the Laws is due to a disturbance outside the control of the player.
- Play is interrupted by the umpire or assistant umpire.

A let is also called foul service, if the ball hits the server's side of the table, if the ball does not pass further than the edge, and if the ball hits the table edge and hits the net.

=== Scoring ===
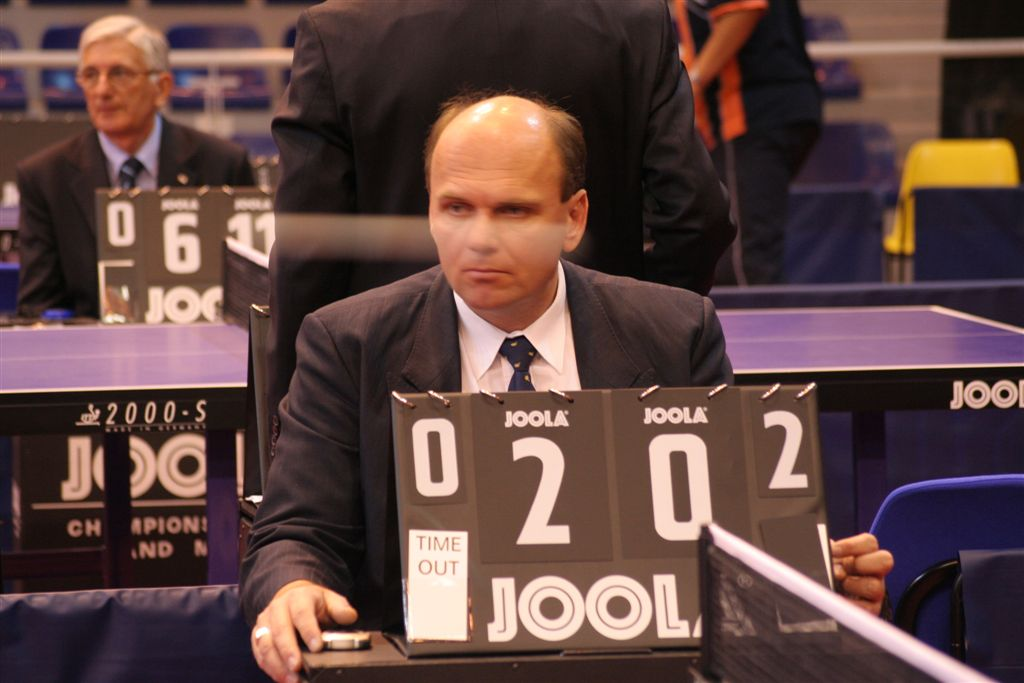
Table tennis umpire

A point is scored by the player for any of several results of the rally:

- The opponent fails to make a correct service or return.
- After making a service or a return, the ball touches anything other than the net assembly before being struck by the opponent.
- The ball passes over the player's court or beyond their end line without touching their court, after being struck by the opponent.
- The opponent obstructs the ball.
- The opponent strikes the ball twice successively. The hand that is holding the racket counts as part of the racket, and making a good return off one's hand or fingers is allowed. It is not a fault if the ball accidentally hits one's hand or fingers and then subsequently hits the racket.
- The opponent strikes the ball with a side of the racket blade whose surface is not covered with rubber.
- The opponent moves the playing surface or touches the net assembly.
- The opponent's free hand touches the playing surface.
- As a receiver under the expedite system, completing 13 returns in a rally.
- The opponent that has been warned by the umpire commits a second offense in the same individual match or team match. If the third offence happens, 2 points will be given to the player. If the individual match or the team match has not ended, any unused penalty points can be transferred to the next game of that match.

A game shall be won by the player first scoring 11 points unless both players score 10 points, when the game shall be won by the first player subsequently gaining a lead of 2 points. A match shall consist of the best of any odd number of games. In competition play, matches are typically best of five or seven games.

=== Alternation of services and ends ===
Service alternates between opponents every two points (regardless of winner of the rally) until the end of the game, unless both players score ten points or the expedite system is operated, when the sequences of serving and receiving stay the same but each player serves for only one point in turn (Deuce). The player serving first in a game receives first in the next game of the match.

After each game, players switch sides of the table. In the last possible game of a match, for example the seventh game in a best of seven match, players change ends when the first player scores five points, regardless of whose turn it is to serve. If the sequence of serving and receiving is out of turn or the ends are not changed, points scored in the wrong situation are still calculated and the game shall be resumed with the order at the score that has been reached.

=== Doubles game ===
Service zone in doubles game

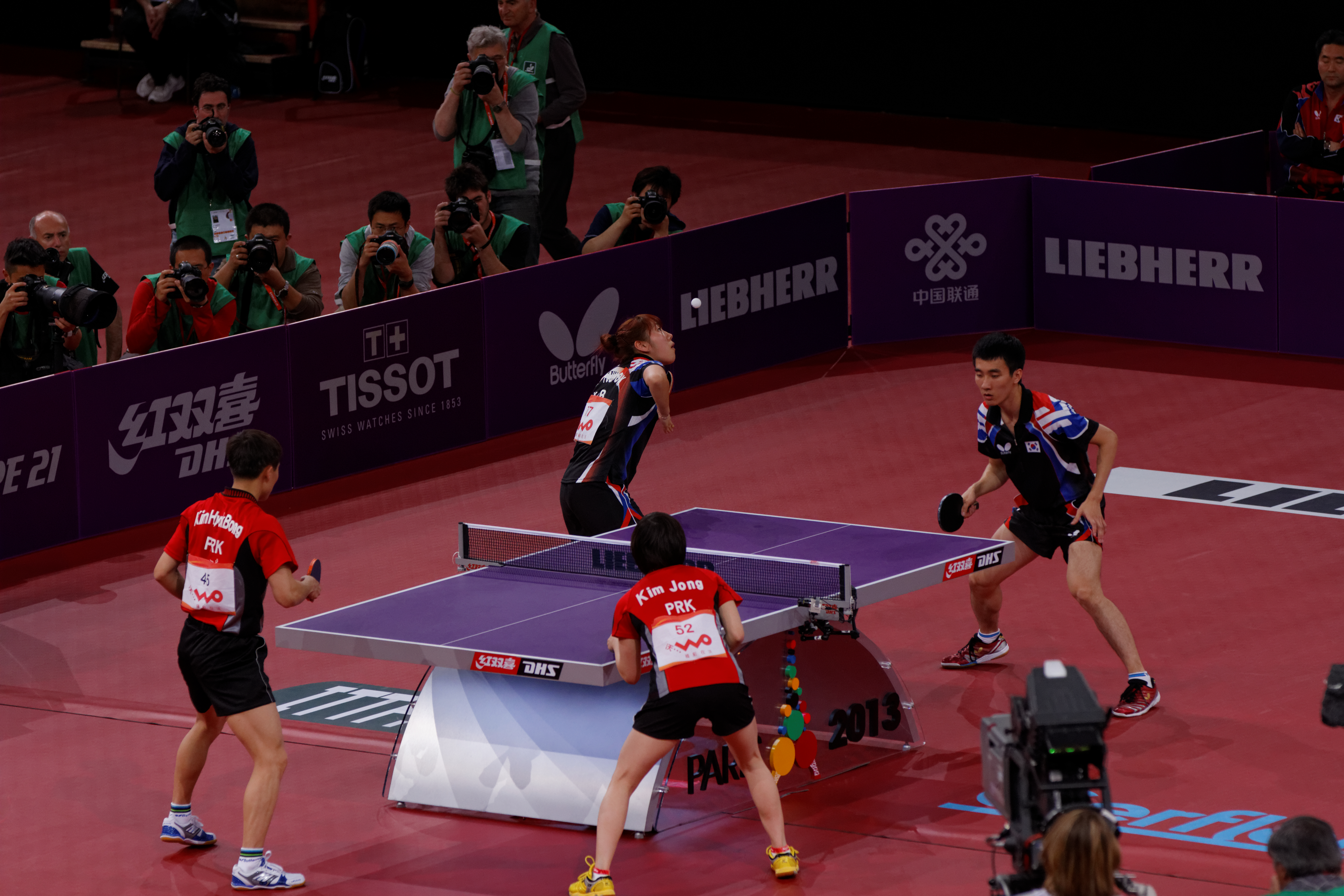
Service of a mixed doubles match

In addition to games between individual players, pairs may also play table tennis. Singles and doubles are both played in international competition, including the Olympic Games since 1988 and the Commonwealth Games since 2002.

In doubles, all the rules of single play are applied except for the following.

Service

A line painted along the long axis of the table to create doubles courts bisects the table. This line's only purpose is to facilitate the doubles service rule, which is that service must originate from the right hand "box" in such a way that the first bounce of the serve bounces once in said right hand box and then must bounce at least once in the opponent side's right hand box (far left box for server), or the receiving pair score a point.

Order of play, serving and receiving

1. Players must hit the ball in turn. For example, if A is paired with B and X is paired with Y, then A is the server and X is the receiver. and the order of play shall be A→X→B→Y. The rally proceeds this way until one side fails to make a legal return and the other side scores.
2. At each change of service, the previous receiver shall become the server and the partner of the previous server shall become the receiver. For example, if the previous order of play is A→X→B→Y, the order becomes X→B→Y→A after the change of service.
3. In the second or the latter games of a match, the game begins in reverse order of play. For example, if the order of play is A→X→B→Y at beginning of the first game, the order begins with X→A→Y→B or Y→B→X→A in the second game depending on either X or Y being chosen as the first server of the game. That means the first receiver of the game is the player who served to the first server of the game in the preceding game. In each game of a doubles match, the pair having the right to serve first shall choose which of them will do so. The receiving pair, however, can only choose in the first game of the match.
4. When a pair reaches 5 points in the final game, the pairs must switch ends of the table and change the receiver to reverse the order of play. For example, when the last order of play before a pair score 5 points in the final game is A→X→B→Y, the order after change shall be A→Y→B→X if A still has the second serve. Otherwise, X is the next server and the order becomes X→A→Y→B.

=== Expedite system ===
If a game is unfinished after 10 minutes of play and fewer than 18 points have been scored, the expedite system is initiated. The umpire interrupts the game, and the game resumes with players serving for one point in turn. If the expedite system is introduced while the ball is not in play, the previous receiver shall serve first. Under the expedite system, the server must win the point before the opponent makes 13 consecutive returns or the point goes to the opponent. The system can also be initiated at any time at the request of both players or pairs. Once introduced, the expedite system remains in force until the end of the match. As it is intended as a rule to shorten the duration of a match, it is mainly deployed in defensive players' matches, which tend to have longer points.

== Grips ==
Though table tennis players grip their rackets in various ways, their grips can be classified into two major families of styles, penhold and shakehand. The rules of table tennis do not prescribe the manner in which one must grip the racket, and numerous grips are employed.

=== Penhold ===
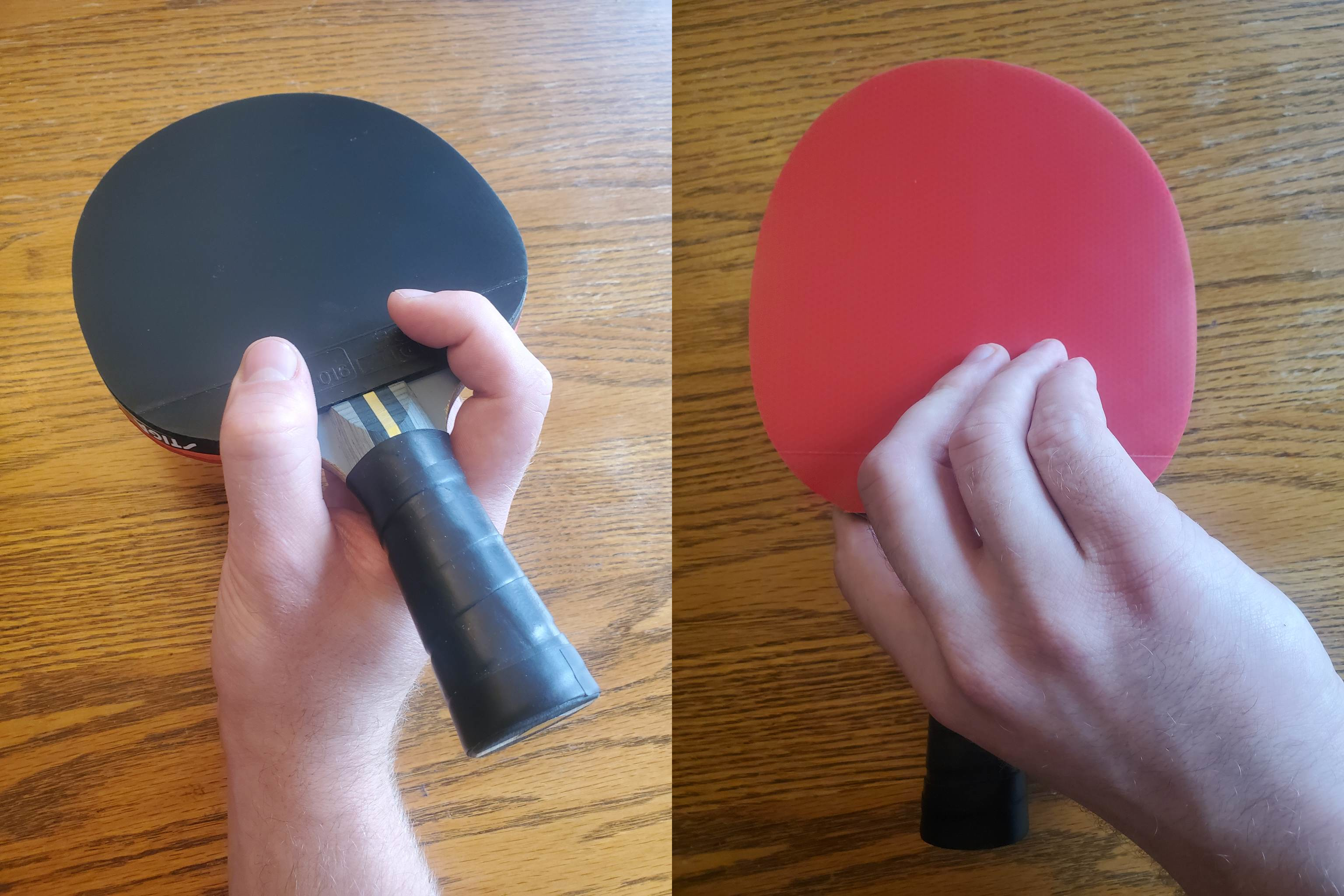
An example of a Chinese Penhold grip

The penhold grip is so-named because one grips the racket similarly to the way one holds a writing instrument. The style of play among penhold players can vary greatly from player to player. The most popular style, usually referred to as the Chinese penhold style, involves curling the middle, ring, and fourth finger on the back of the blade with the three fingers always touching one another. Chinese penholders favour a round racket head, for a more over-the-table style of play. In contrast, another style, sometimes referred to as the Japanese/Korean penhold grip, involves splaying those three fingers out across the back of the racket, usually with all three fingers touching the back of the racket, rather than stacked upon one another. Sometimes a combination of the two styles occurs, wherein the middle, ring and fourth fingers are straight, but still stacked, or where all fingers may be touching the back of the racket, but are also in contact with one another. Japanese and Korean penholders will often use a square-headed racket for an away-from-the-table style of play. Traditionally these square-headed rackets feature a block of cork on top of the handle, as well as a thin layer of cork on the back of the racket, for increased grip and comfort. Penhold styles are popular among players originating from East Asian countries such as China, Japan, South Korea, and Taiwan.

Traditionally, penhold players use only one side of the racket to hit the ball during normal play, and the side which is in contact with the last three fingers is generally not used. This configuration is sometimes referred to as "traditional penhold" and is more commonly found in square-headed racket styles. However, the Chinese developed a technique in the 1990s in which a penholder uses both sides of the racket to hit the ball, where the player produces a backhand stroke (most often topspin) known as a reverse penhold backhand by turning the traditional side of the racket to face one's self, and striking the ball with the opposite side of the racket. This stroke has greatly improved and strengthened the penhold style both physically and psychologically, as it eliminates the strategic weakness of the traditional penhold backhand.

=== Shakehand ===
Shakehand grip

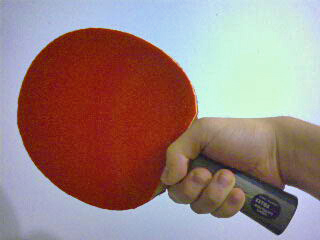
Forehand

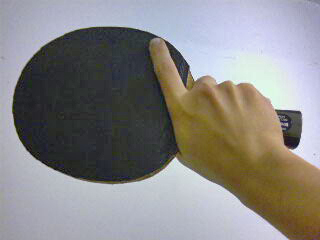
Backhand

The shakehand grip is so-named because the racket is grasped as if one is performing a handshake. Though it is sometimes referred to as the "tennis" or "Western" grip, it bears no relation to the Western tennis grip, which was popularized on the West Coast of the United States in which the racket is rotated 90°, and played with the wrist turned so that on impact the knuckles face the target. In table tennis, "Western" refers to Western nations, for this is the grip that players native to Europe and the Americas have almost exclusively employed.

The shakehand grip's simplicity and versatility, coupled with the acceptance among top-level Chinese trainers that the European style of play should be emulated and trained against, has established it as a common grip even in China. Many world-class European and East Asian players currently use the shakehand grip, and it is generally accepted that shakehands is easier to learn than penholder, allowing a broader range of playing styles both offensive and defensive.

=== Seemiller ===
The Seemiller grip is named after the American table tennis champion Danny Seemiller, who used it. It is achieved by placing the thumb and index finger on either side of the bottom of the racquet head and holding the handle with the rest of the fingers. Since only one side of the racquet is used to hit the ball, two contrasting rubber types can be applied to the blade, offering the advantage of "twiddling" the racket to fool the opponent. Seemiller paired inverted rubber with anti-spin rubber. Many players today combine inverted and long-pipped rubber. The grip is considered exceptional for blocking, especially on the backhand side, and for forehand loops of backspin balls. The Seemiller grip's popularity reached its apex in 1985 when four (Danny Seemiller, Ricky Seemiller, Eric Boggan and Brian Masters) of the United States' five participants in the World Championships used it.

== Stance ==
'A good ready position will enable you to move quickly into position and to stay balanced whilst playing powerful strokes.'

The stance in table tennis is also known as the 'ready position'. It is the position every player initially adopts when receiving and returns to after playing a shot in order to be prepared to make the next shot. It involves the feet being spaced wider than shoulder width and a partial crouch being adopted; the crouch is an efficient posture for moving quickly from and also preloads the muscles enabling a more dynamic movement. The upper torso is positioned slightly forward and the player is looking forwards. The racket is held at the ready with a bent arm. The position should feel balanced and provide a solid base for striking and quick lateral movement. Players may tailor their stance based upon their personal preferences, and alter it during the game based upon the specific circumstances.

== Types of strokes ==
Table tennis strokes generally break down into offensive and defensive categories.

=== Offensive strokes ===
==== Hit ====
Also known as speed drive, a direct hit on the ball propelling it forward back to the opponent. This stroke differs from speed drives in other racket sports like tennis because the racket is primarily perpendicular to the direction of the stroke and most of the energy applied to the ball results in speed rather than spin, creating a shot that does not arc much, but is fast enough that it can be difficult to return. A speed drive is used mostly for keeping the ball in play, applying pressure on the opponent, and potentially opening up an opportunity for a more powerful attack.

==== Loop ====
Perfected during the 1960s, the loop is essentially the reverse of the chop. The racket is parallel to the direction of the stroke ("closed") and the racket thus grazes the ball, resulting in a large amount of topspin. A good loop drive will arc quite a bit, and once striking the opponent's side of the table will jump forward, much like a kick serve in tennis. Most professional players nowadays, such as Ding Ning, Timo Boll and Zhang Jike, primarily use loop for offense.

==== Counter-hit ====
The counter-hit is usually a counterattack against drives, normally high loop drives. The racket is held closed and near to the ball, which is hit with a short movement "off the bounce" (immediately after hitting the table) so that the ball travels faster to the other side. Kenta Matsudaira is known for primarily using counter-hit for offense.

==== Flip ====
When a player tries to attack a ball that has not bounced beyond the edge of the table, the player does not have the room to wind up in a backswing. The ball may still be attacked, however, and the resulting shot is called a flip because the backswing is compressed into a quick wrist action. A flip is not a single stroke and can resemble either a loop drive or a loop in its characteristics. What identifies the stroke is that the backswing is compressed into a short wrist flick.

==== Smash ====
A player will typically execute a smash when the opponent has returned a ball that bounces too high or too close to the net. It is nearly always done with a forehand stroke. Smashing uses rapid acceleration to impart as much speed on the ball as possible so that the opponent cannot react in time. The racket is generally perpendicular to the direction of the stroke. Because the speed is the main aim of this shot, the spin on the ball is often minimal, although it can be applied as well. An offensive table tennis player will think of a rally as a build-up to a winning smash. Smash is used more often with penhold grip.

=== Defensive strokes ===
==== Push ====
The push (or "slice" in Asia) is usually used for keeping the point alive and creating offensive opportunities. A push resembles a tennis slice: the racket cuts underneath the ball, imparting backspin and causing the ball to float slowly to the other side of the table. A push can be difficult to attack because the backspin on the ball causes it to drop toward the table upon striking the opponent's racket. In order to attack a push, a player must usually loop (if the push is long) or flip (if the push is short) the ball back over the net. Often, the best option for beginners is to simply push the ball back again, resulting in pushing rallies. Against good players, it may be the worst option because the opponent will counter with a loop, putting the first player in a defensive position. Pushing can have advantages in some circumstances, such as when the opponent makes easy mistakes.

==== Chop ====
A chop is the defensive, backspin counterpart to the offensive loop drive. A chop is essentially a bigger, heavier push, taken well back from the table. The racket face points primarily horizontally, perhaps a little bit upward, and the direction of the stroke is straight down. The object of a defensive chop is to match the topspin of the opponent's shot with backspin. A good chop will float nearly horizontally back to the table, in some cases having so much backspin that the ball actually rises. Such a chop can be extremely difficult to return due to its enormous amount of backspin. Some defensive players can also impart no-spin or sidespin variations of the chop. Some famous choppers include Joo Sae-hyuk and Wu Yang.

==== Block ====
A block is executed by simply placing the racket in front of the ball right after the ball bounces; thus, the ball rebounds back toward the opponent with nearly as much energy as it came in with. This requires precision, since the ball's spin, speed, and location all influence the correct angle of a block. It is very possible for an opponent to execute a perfect loop, drive, or smash, only to have the blocked shot come back just as fast. Due to the power involved in offensive strokes, often an opponent simply cannot recover quickly enough to return the blocked shot, especially if the block is aimed at an unexpected side of the table. Blocks almost always produce the same spin as was received, many times topspin.

==== Lob ====
The defensive lob propels the ball about five metres in height, only to land on the opponent's side of the table with great amounts of spin. The stroke itself consists of lifting the ball to an enormous height before it falls back to the opponent's side of the table. A lob can have nearly any kind of spin. Though the opponent may smash the ball hard and fast, a good defensive lob could be more difficult to return due to the unpredictability and heavy amounts of the spin on the ball. Thus, though backed off the table by tens of feet and running to reach the ball, a good defensive player can still win the point using good lobs. The lob is used less frequently by professional players. A notable exception is Michael Maze.

== Effects of spin ==
Adding spin onto the ball causes major changes in table tennis gameplay. Although nearly every stroke or serve creates some kind of spin, understanding the individual types of spin allows players to defend against and use different spins effectively.

=== Backspin ===
Backspin is where the bottom half of the ball is rotating away from the player, and is imparted by striking the base of the ball with a downward movement. At the professional level, backspin is usually used defensively in order to keep the ball low. Backspin is commonly employed in service because it is harder to produce an offensive return, though at the professional level most people serve sidespin with either backspin or topspin. Due to the initial lift of the ball, there is a limit on how much speed with which one can hit the ball without missing the opponent's side of the table. However, backspin also makes it harder for the opponent to return the ball with great speed because of the required angular precision of the return. Alterations are frequently made to regulations regarding equipment in an effort to maintain a balance between defensive and offensive spin choices. It is actually possible to smash with backspin offensively, but only on high balls that are close to the net.

=== Topspin ===
The topspin stroke has a smaller influence on the first part of the ball curve. Like the backspin stroke, however, the axis of spin remains roughly perpendicular to the trajectory of the ball thus allowing for the Magnus effect to dictate the subsequent curvature. After the apex of the curve, the ball dips downwards as it approaches the opposing side, before bouncing. On the bounce, the topspin will accelerate the ball, much in the same way that a wheel which is already spinning would accelerate upon making contact with the ground. When the opponent attempts to return the ball, the topspin causes the ball to jump upwards and the opponent is forced to compensate for the topspin by adjusting the angle of his or her racket. This is known as "closing the racket".

The speed limitation of the topspin stroke is minor compared to the backspin stroke. This stroke is the predominant technique used in professional competition because it gives the opponent less time to respond. In table tennis topspin is regarded as an offensive technique due to increased ball speed, lower bio-mechanical efficiency and the pressure that it puts on the opponent by reducing reaction time. (It is possible to play defensive topspin-lobs from far behind the table, but only highly skilled players use this stroke with any tactical efficiency.) Topspin is the least common type of spin to be found in service at the professional level, simply because it is much easier to attack a top-spin ball that is not moving at high speed.

=== Sidespin ===
This type of spin is predominantly employed during service, wherein the contact angle of the racket can be more easily varied. Unlike the two aforementioned techniques, sidespin causes the ball to spin on an axis which is vertical, rather than horizontal. The axis of rotation is still roughly perpendicular to the trajectory of the ball. In this circumstance, the Magnus effect will still dictate the curvature of the ball to some degree. Another difference is that, unlike backspin and topspin, sidespin will have relatively very little effect on the bounce of the ball, much in the same way that a spinning top would not travel left or right if its axis of rotation were exactly vertical. This makes sidespin a useful weapon in service, because it is less easily recognized when bouncing, and the ball "loses" less spin on the bounce. Sidespin can also be employed in offensive rally strokes, often from a greater distance, as an adjunct to topspin or backspin. This stroke is sometimes referred to as a "hook". The hook can even be used in some extreme cases to circumvent the net when away from the table.

=== Corkspin ===
Players employ this type of spin almost exclusively when serving, but at the professional level, it is also used from time to time in the lob. Unlike any of the techniques mentioned above, corkspin (or "drill-spin") has the axis of spin relatively parallel to the ball's trajectory, so that the Magnus effect has little or no effect on the trajectory of a cork-spun ball: upon bouncing, the ball will dart right or left (according to the direction of the spin), severely complicating the return. In theory, this type of spin produces the most obnoxious effects, but it is less strategically practical than sidespin or backspin, because of the limitations that it imposes upon the opponent during their return. Aside from the initial direction change when bouncing, unless it goes out of reach, the opponent can counter with either topspin or backspin. A backspin stroke is similar in the fact that the corkspin stroke has a lower maximum velocity, simply due to the contact angle of the racket when producing the stroke. To impart a spin on the ball which is parallel to its trajectory, the racket must be swung more or less perpendicular to the trajectory of the ball, greatly limiting the forward momentum that the racket transfers to the ball. Corkspin is almost always mixed with another variety of spin since alone, it is not only less effective but also harder to produce.

== Competitions ==
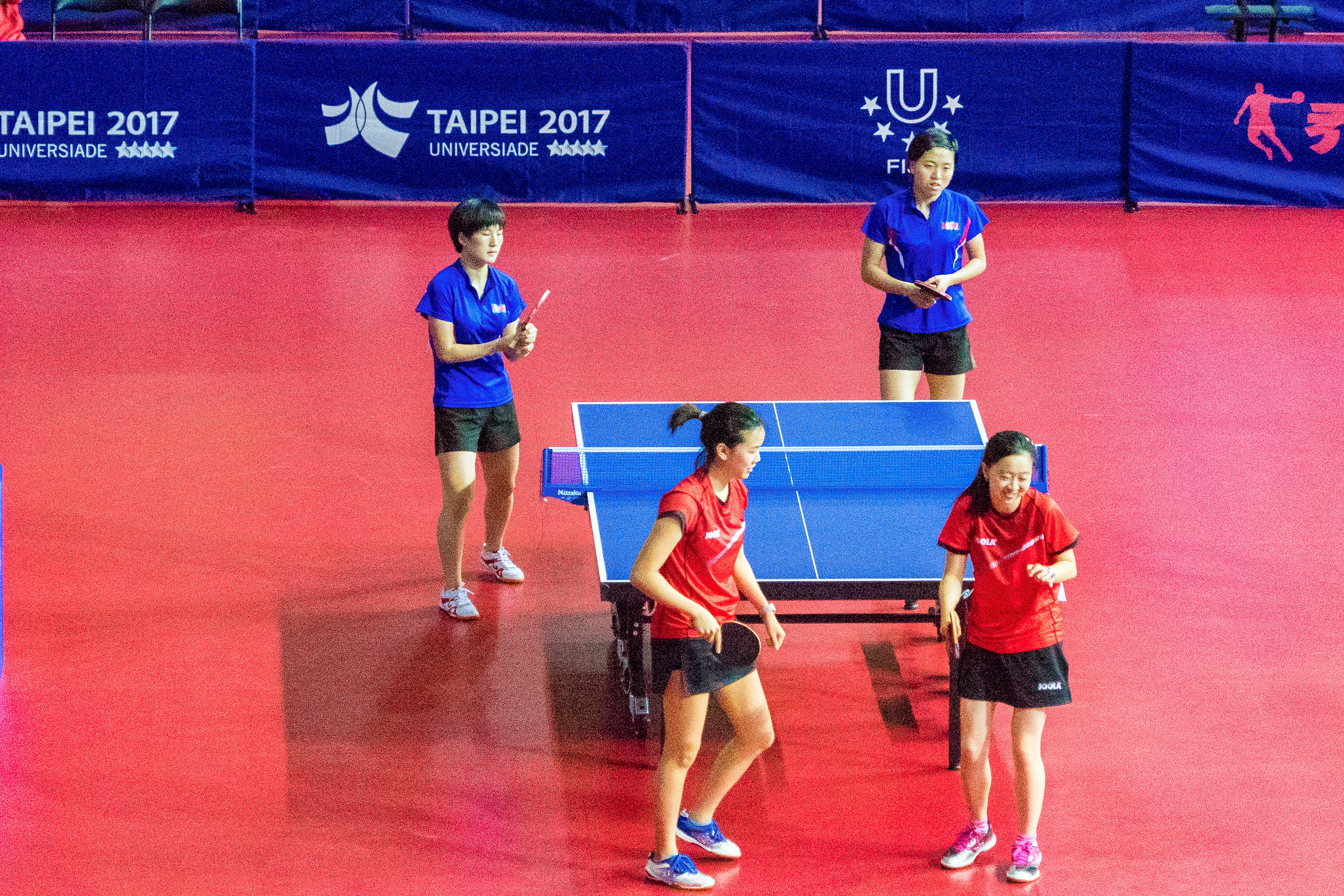
A 2017 match between players from the United States and North Korea

Competitive table tennis is popular in East Asia and Europe, and has been gaining attention in the United States. The most important international competitions are the World Table Tennis Championships, the Table Tennis World Cup, the Olympics and the World Table Tennis Finals. Continental competitions include the following:

- European Championships
- Europe Top-16
- the Asian Championships
- the Asian Games

Chinese players have won 60% of the men's World Championships since 1959; in the women's competition for the Corbillon Cup, Chinese players have won all but three of the World Championships since 1971. Other strong teams come from East Asia and Europe, including Austria, Belarus, Germany, Hong Kong, Portugal, Japan, South Korea, Singapore, Sweden, and Taiwan.

There are professional competitions at the clubs level; the respective leagues of Austria, Belgium, China (China Table Tennis Super League), Japan (T.League), France, Germany (Bundesliga), and Russia are examples of the highest level. There are also some important international club teams competitions such as the European Champions League and its former competitor, the European Club Cup, where the top club teams from European countries compete.

Virtual reality table tennis competition took place in Olympic Esports Week on June 24, 2023 in Singapore. Eleven Table Tennis was the game played during the event. The final match was played between two players both representing France. ITTF Group CEO, Steve Dainton also participated in the event. European table tennis federation and French table tennis association are also arranging virtual reality table tennis tournaments.

== Naturalized players in international competition ==
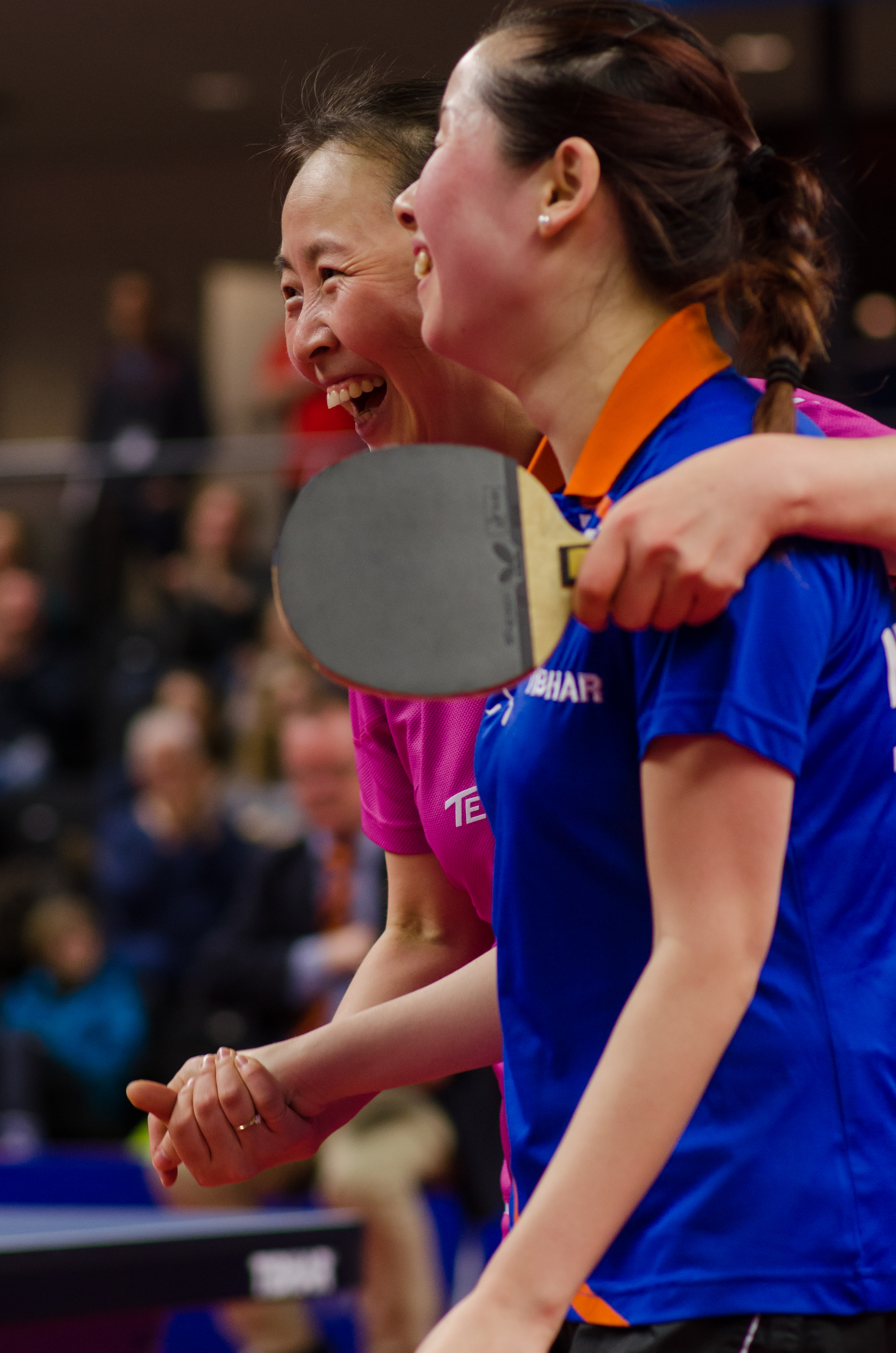
Li Jiao and Li Jie, representing the Netherlands, finished in the top 2 at the 2015 European Games. To date, all six women's singles medalists in the history of the European Games have been Chinese-born.

According to the New York Times, 31% of the table tennis players at the 2016 Summer Olympics were naturalized. The rate was twice as high as the next sport, basketball, which featured 15% of naturalized players.

Feng Tianwei, a Chinese-born player representing Singapore, has medaled in three Olympic table tennis events, more medals than native Singaporeans have won in all other sports combined (two). These successes have been somewhat controversial in Singapore. In 2014, Singapore Table Tennis Association's president Lee Bee Wah quit over this issue; her successor, Ellen Lee, later favoured the application for citizenship of Zeng Jian, a China-born paddler.

The rate of naturalization accelerated after the ITTF's 2009 decision (one year after China won every possible Olympic medal in the sport) to reduce the number of entries per association in both the Olympics and the World Table Tennis Championships.

In 2019, the ITTF adopted new regulations which state that players who acquired a new nationality may not represent their new association before:

- 1 year after the date of registration, if the player is under the age of 15 when registered and has never represented another association
- 3 years after the date of registration, if the player is under the age of 15 when registered and has already represented another association
- 5 years after the date of registration, if the player is under the age of 18 but at least 15 years of age when registered
- 7 years after the date of registration, if the player is under the age of 21 but at least 18 years of age when registered
- 9 years after the date of registration, if the player is at least 21 years old when registered

== Notable players ==
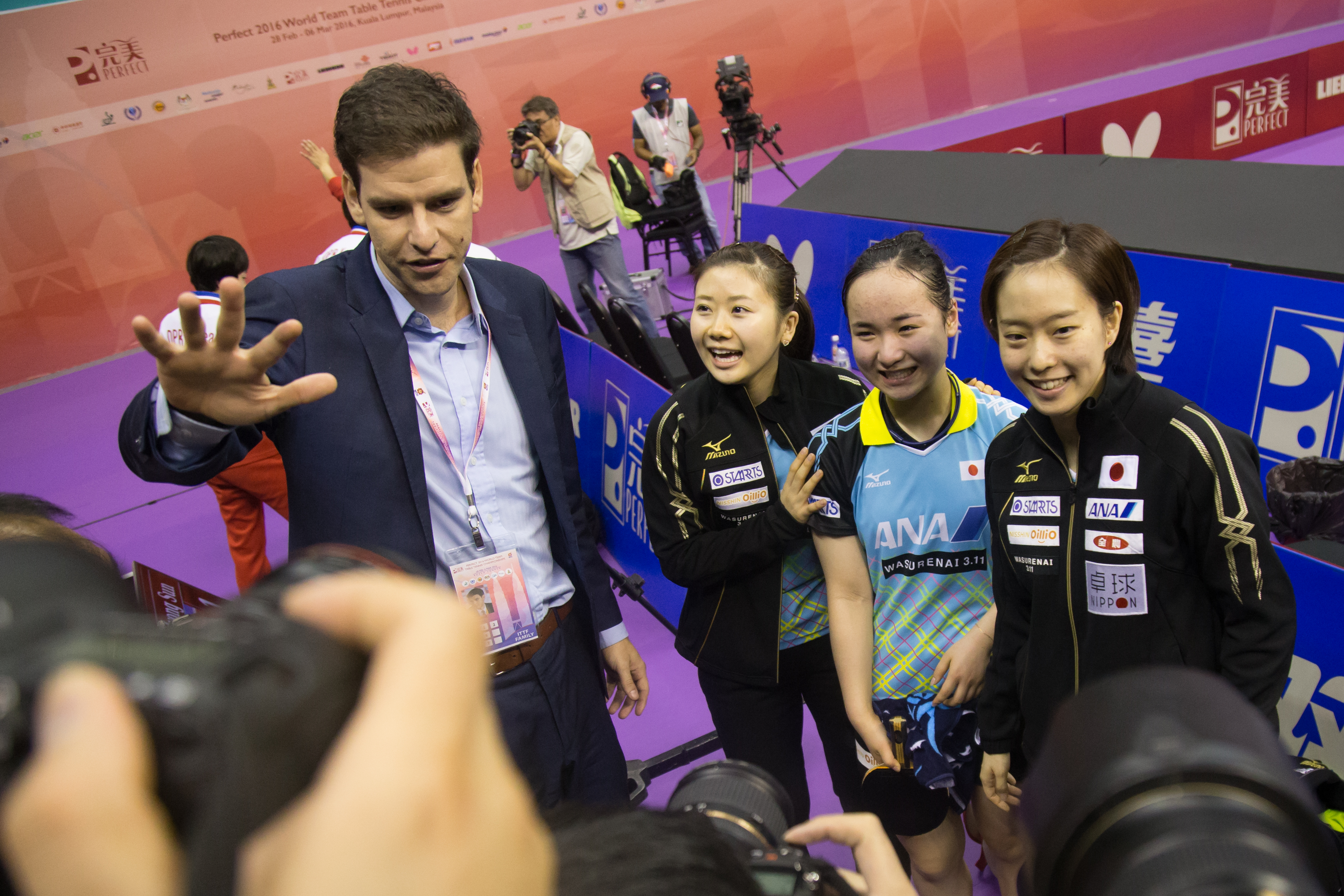
In Japan, table tennis stars like Ai Fukuhara, Mima Ito, and Kasumi Ishikawa are consistently ranked among the country's most marketable athletes.

An official hall of fame exists at the ITTF Museum. A Grand Slam is earned by a player who wins singles crowns at the Olympic Games, World Championships, and World Cup. Jan-Ove Waldner of Sweden first completed the grand slam at 1992 Olympic Games. Deng Yaping of China is the first female recorded at the inaugural Women's World Cup in 1996. The following table presents an exhaustive list of all players to have completed a grand slam.

Overview of grand slam table tennis players
Name	Gender	Nationality	Times won		
Name	Gender	Nationality	Olympics	World Championships	World Cup
Jan-Ove Waldner	Male	Sweden	1 (1992)	2 (1989, 1997)	1 (1990)
Deng Yaping	Female	China	2 (1992, 1996)	3 (1991, 1995, 1997)	1 (1996)
Liu Guoliang	Male	China	1 (1996)	1 (1999)	1 (1996)
Wang Nan	Female	China	1 (2000)	3 (1999, 2001, 2003)	4 (1997, 1998, 2003, 2007)
Kong Linghui	Male	China	1 (2000)	1 (1995)	1 (1995)
Zhang Yining	Female	China	2 (2004, 2008)	2 (2005, 2009)	4 (2001, 2002, 2004, 2005)
Zhang Jike	Male	China	1 (2012)	2 (2011, 2013)	2 (2011, 2014)
Li Xiaoxia	Female	China	1 (2012)	1 (2013)	1 (2008)
Ding Ning	Female	China	1 (2016)	3 (2011, 2015, 2017)	2 (2011, 2014)
Ma Long	Male	China	2 (2016, 2020)	3 (2015, 2017, 2019)	3 (2012, 2015, 2024)
Fan Zhendong	Male	China	1 (2024)	2 (2021, 2023)	4 (2016, 2018, 2019, 2020)

Jean-Philippe Gatien, Wang Hao and Sun Yingsha won both the World Championships and the World Cup, but lost in the gold medal matches at the Olympics. Ma Lin and Chen Meng won both the Olympic gold and the World Cup, but lost in the finals of the World Championships. Jörgen Persson, Liu Shiwen and Wang Chuqin also won the titles except the Olympic Games. Persson is one of the five table tennis players to have competed at seven Olympic Games. Zhang Yining and Ma Long are the only players to have completed the grand slam twice.

== Governance ==
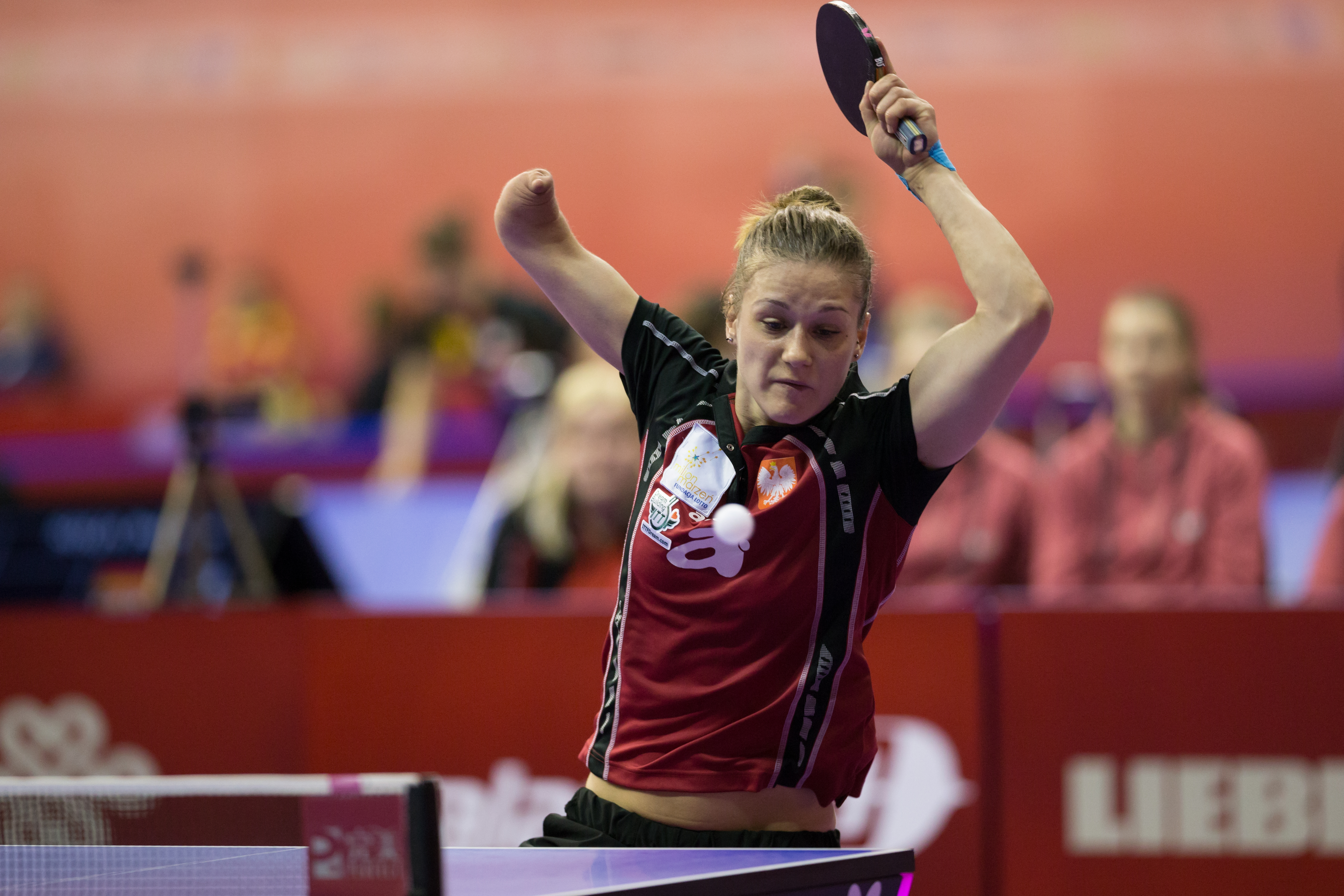
Natalia Partyka, one of the few players who have competed in both the Paralympics and Olympics

Founded in 1926, the International Table Tennis Federation (ITTF) is the worldwide governing body for table tennis, which maintains an international ranking system in addition to organizing events like the World Table Tennis Championships. In 2007, the governance for table tennis for persons with a disability was transferred from the International Paralympic Committee to the ITTF.

On many continents, there is a governing body responsible for table tennis on that continent. For example, the European Table Tennis Union (ETTU) is the governing body responsible for table tennis in Europe. There are also national bodies and other local authorities responsible for the sport, such as USA Table Tennis (USATT), which is the national governing body for table tennis in the United States.

== Variants ==
Hardbat table tennis uses rackets with short outward "pips" and no sponge, resulting in decreased speeds and reduced spin. World Championship of Ping Pong uses old-fashioned wooden paddles covered with sandpaper.

Round the World (also called Round Robin or Round the Table) table tennis is an informal party-type variation in which players line up on either side of the table. When a player hits the ball they set the paddle down, and the player behind them picks it up to receive the return. When a player sets down their paddle, they move to the line at the opposing side of the table. Players are eliminated as they lose a point. When only 2 players remain, a player hits the ball, sets their paddle down, spins and then retrieves their paddle to make the return.

== See also ==
- Disability classification in table tennis
- Glossary of table tennis
- International Table Tennis Federation
- List of ITTF World Tour winners
- List of table tennis players
- Beer pong
- Headis
- Ping-pong diplomacy
- Pingpongo
- Pong
- Table squash

== Bibliography ==
- Uzorinac, Zdenko (2001). ITTF 1926 - 2001 Table Tennis Legends. ITTF. ISBN 2-94031-200-1. OCLC 248920627.
- Charyn, Jerome (2002). Sizzling Chops & Devilish Spins: Ping-Pong and the Art of Staying Alive. Four Walls Eight Windows. ISBN 1-56858-242-0.
- Hodges, Larry (1993). Table Tennis: Steps to Success. Human Kinetics. ISBN 0-87322-403-5.
- International Table Tennis Federation (2011). ITTF Handbook 2011/2012. Archived from the original on 6 July 2010.
- International Table Tennis Federation (2021). 2021 ITTF Handbook.
- Seemiller, Dan (1996). Winning Table Tennis: Skills, Drills, and Strategies. Human Kinetics. ISBN 0-88011-520-3.
