= 2000 World Team Table Tennis Championships – Men's team =

2000 men's team (Swaythling Cup)

The 2000 World Table Tennis Championships – men's team (Swaythling Cup) was the 45th edition of the men's team championship.

Sweden won the gold medal defeating China 3–2 in the final. Japan and Italy won bronze medals.

== Medalists ==
| Event | Gold | Silver | Bronze |
|---|---|---|---|
| | Sweden; Fredrik Håkansson; Peter Karlsson; Jörgen Persson; Jan-Ove Waldner | China; Kong Linghui; Liu Guoliang; Liu Guozheng; Ma Lin; Wang Liqin | Italy; Umberto Giardina; Massimiliano Mondello; Valentino Piacentini; Yang Min |
| | Sweden; Fredrik Håkansson; Peter Karlsson; Jörgen Persson; Jan-Ove Waldner | China; Kong Linghui; Liu Guoliang; Liu Guozheng; Ma Lin; Wang Liqin | Japan; Seiko Iseki; Kōji Matsushita; Hiroshi Shibutani; Toshio Tasaki; Ryo Yuzawa |

== Final stage knockout phase ==
=== Quarter finals ===
| Team One | Team Two | Score |
|---|---|---|
| Sweden | Germany | 3–0 |
| China | South Korea | 3–0 |
| Italy | Netherlands | 3–1 |
| Japan | Chinese Taipei | 3–2 |

=== Semifinals ===
| Team One | Team Two | Score |
|---|---|---|
| Sweden | Italy | 3–1 |
| China | Japan | 3–0 |

=== Final ===
| Sweden 3 | | China 2 | Score |
|---|---|---|---|
| Waldner | bt | Liu Guoliang | 19–21 21–7 23–21 |
| Persson | bt | Kong Linghui | 21–17 21–19 |
| Karlsson | lost to | Liu Guozheng | 6–21 16–21 |
| Waldner | lost to | Kong Linghui | 9–21 17–21 |
| Persson | bt | Liu Guoliang | 18–21 21–17 21–18 |

== See also ==
- List of World Table Tennis Championships medalists
