= Table tennis at the 1996 Summer Olympics – Men's doubles =

Table tennis – Men's doubles at the Games of the XXVI Olympiad
- Venue: Georgia World Congress Center
- Date: 23 to 30 July 1996
- Competitors: 62 from 25 nations

Medalists
1st place, gold medalist(s)		Liu Guoliang; Kong Linghui	China
2nd place, silver medalist(s)		Lü Lin; Wang Tao	China
3rd place, bronze medalist(s)		Lee Chul-seung; Yoo Nam-kyu	South Korea

These are the results of the men's doubles competition, one of two events for male competitors in table tennis at the 1996 Summer Olympics in Atlanta.

== Group stage ==
=== Group A ===
Rank	Athlete	W	L	GW	GL	PW	PL	CHN	AUT	CRO	AUS
1	Lü Lin and Wang Tao (CHN)	3	0	6	0	126	74	X	2–0	2–0	2–0
2	Ding Yi and Qian Qianli (AUT)	2	1	4	3	123	119	0–2	X	2–1	2–0
3	Damir Atiković and Zoran Primorac (CRO)	1	2	3	5	131	144	0–2	1–2	X	2–1
4	Paul Langley and Russ Lavale (AUS)	0	3	1	6	95	138	0–2	0–2	1–2	X

=== Group B ===
Rank	Athlete	W	L	GW	GL	PW	PL	SWE	NED	JPN	CHI
1	Jörgen Persson and Jan-Ove Waldner (SWE)	3	0	6	2	160	139	X	2–1	2–1	2–0
2	Danny Heister and Trinko Keen (NED)	2	1	5	3	157	140	1–2	X	2–1	2–0
3	Toshio Tasaki and Ryo Yuzawa (JPN)	1	2	4	4	152	144	1–2	1–2	X	2–0
4	Augusto Morales Marengo and Juan Salamanca (CHI)	0	3	0	6	80	126	0–2	0–2	0–2	X

=== Group C ===
Rank	Athlete	W	L	GW	GL	PW	PL	CHN	FRA	SWE	GHA
1	Kong Linghui and Liu Guoliang (CHN)	3	0	6	0	126	77	X	2–0	2–0	2–0
2	Patrick Chila and Christophe Legout (FRA)	2	1	4	3	133	102	0–2	X	2–1	2–0
3	Peter Karlsson and Thomas von Scheele (SWE)	1	2	3	4	116	120	0–2	1–2	X	2–0
4	Winifred Addy and Isaac Opoku (GHA)	0	3	0	6	50	126	0–2	0–2	0–2	X

=== Group D ===
Rank	Athlete	W	L	GW	GL	PW	PL	FRA	HKG	PRK	JAM
1	Damien Eloi and Jean-Philippe Gatien (FRA)	3	0	6	0	126	74	X	2–0	2–0	2–0
2	Chan Kong Wah and Lo Chuen Tsung (HKG)	2	1	4	3	126	129	0–2	X	2–1	2–0
3	Choe Kyong and Li Gun-Sang (PRK)	1	2	3	4	116	128	0–2	1–2	X	2–0
4	Michael Hyatt and Stephen Hylton (JAM)	0	3	0	6	89	126	0–2	0–2	0–2	X

=== Group E ===
Rank	Athlete	W	L	GW	GL	PW	PL	GER	AUT	CAN	BRA
1	Steffen Fetzner and Jörg Roßkopf (GER)	3	0	6	0	127	81	X	2–0	2–0	2–0
2	Karl Jindrak and Werner Schlager (AUT)	2	1	4	3	144	125	0–2	X	2–0	2–1
3	Johnny Huang and Gideon Ng (CAN)	1	2	2	4	97	106	0–2	0–2	X	2–0
4	Hugo Hoyama and Giuliano Peixoto (BRA)	0	3	1	6	93	149	0–2	1–2	0–2	X

=== Group F ===
Rank	Athlete	W	L	GW	GL	PW	PL	KOR	POL	TPE
1	Kang Hee-Chan and Kim Taek-Soo (KOR)	2	0	4	0	84	62	X	2–0	2–0
2	Lucjan Błaszczyk and Andrzej Grubba (POL)	1	1	2	3	100	97	0–2	X	2–1
3	Chiang Peng-lung and Wu Wen-chia (TPE)	0	2	1	4	82	107	0–2	1–2	X

=== Group G ===
Rank	Athlete	W	L	GW	GL	PW	PL	KOR	RUS	BLR	USA
1	Lee Chul-Seung and Yoo Nam-Kyu (KOR)	3	0	6	0	126	89	X	2–0	2–0	2–0
2	Andrei Mazunov and Dmitry Mazunov (RUS)	2	1	4	2	120	104	0–2	X	2–0	2–0
3	Vladimir Samsonov and Yevgeny Shchetinin (BLR)	1	2	2	4	103	113	0–2	0–2	X	2–0
4	Jim Butler and Todd Sweeris (USA)	0	3	0	6	83	126	0–2	0–2	0–2	X

=== Group H ===
Rank	Athlete	W	L	GW	GL	PW	PL	JPN	SCG	NGR	CZE
1	Kōji Matsushita and Hiroshi Shibutani (JPN)	3	0	6	0	129	95	X	2–0	2–0	2–0
2	Slobodan Grujić and Ilija Lupulesku (SCG)	2	1	4	2	117	115	0–2	X	2–0	2–0
3	Sule Olaleye and Segun Toriola (NGR)	1	2	2	4	114	115	0–2	0–2	X	2–0
4	Petr Korbel and Josef Plachý (CZE)	0	3	0	6	94	129	0–2	0–2	0–2	X

== Knockout stage ==
Quarterfinals
A1	Lü Lin (CHN); Wang Tao (CHN)	21	18	18	21	21
F1	Kang Hee-chan (KOR); Kim Taek-soo (KOR)	12	21	21	12	12
E1	Steffen Fetzner (GER); Jörg Roßkopf (GER)	21	21	21
D1	Damien Eloi (FRA); Jean-Philippe Gatien (FRA)	12	17	10
C1	Kong Linghui (CHN); Liu Guoliang (CHN)	21	21	21
H1	Koji Matsushita (JPN); Hiroshi Shibutani (JPN)	15	19	15
G1	Lee Chul-seung (KOR); Yoo Nam-kyu (KOR)	21	21	21
B1	Jörgen Persson (SWE); Jan-Ove Waldner (SWE)	18	16	17

Semifinals
A1	Lü Lin (CHN); Wang Tao (CHN)	21	21	21
E1	Steffen Fetzner (GER); Jörg Roßkopf (GER)	10	17	7
C1	Kong Linghui (CHN); Liu Guoliang (CHN)	21	21	21
G1	Lee Chul-seung (KOR); Yoo Nam-kyu (KOR)	17	16	19

Gold medal match
A1	Lü Lin (CHN); Wang Tao (CHN)	8	21	19	11
C1	Kong Linghui (CHN); Liu Guoliang (CHN)	21	13	21	21
Bronze medal match
E1	Steffen Fetzner (GER); Jörg Roßkopf (GER)	18	12	20
G1	Lee Chul-seung (KOR); Yoo Nam-kyu (KOR)	21	21	22
