= Table tennis at the 2000 Summer Olympics – Men's doubles =

Table tennis at the Olympics

Table tennis – Men's doubles at the Games of the XXVII Olympiad
- Venue: State Sports Centre
- Date: 16 to 23 September 2000
- Competitors: 72 from 29 nations

Medalists
1st place, gold medalist(s)		Wang Liqin; Yan Sen	China
2nd place, silver medalist(s)		Liu Guoliang; Kong Linghui	China
3rd place, bronze medalist(s)		Jean-Philippe Gatien; Patrick Chila	France

These are the results of the men's doubles competition, one of two events for male competitors in table tennis at the 2000 Summer Olympics in Sydney.

Among 36 entries, eight seeded pairs were allocated into the draw of knockout stage which started from the round of 16. The rest 28 pairs were reduced to 24 pairs by four knockout matches. 24 pairs competed in eight groups of three pairs per group. Winners of each group advanced to the knockout stage.

== Seeds ==
1. Kong Linghui / Liu Guoliang (CHN) (final, silver medalists)
2. Wang Liqin / Yan Sen (CHN) (champions, gold medalists)
3. Chang Yen-shu / Chiang Peng-lung (TPE) (quarterfinals)
4. Patrick Chila / Jean-Philippe Gatien (FRA) (semifinals, bronze medalists)
5. Karl Jindrak / Werner Schlager (AUT) (quarterfinals)
6. Jörgen Persson / Jan-Ove Waldner (SWE) (first round)
7. Kim Taek-soo / Oh Sang-eun (KOR) (quarterfinals)
8. Lee Chul-seung / Ryu Seung-min (KOR) (semifinals, fourth place)

== Qualification round ==
The winners of each qualification match advanced to the group stage.

Pair 1	Pair 2
Hugo Hoyama and Carlos Kawai (BRA) beat	David Kaci and Farid Oulami (ALG)
Brett Clarke and Jeff Plumb (AUS) beat	Francisco Arado and Rubén Arado (CUB)
Jorge Gambra and Augusto Morales (CHI) beat	Ismu Harinto and Anton Suseno (INA)
Todd Sweeris and David Zhuang (USA) beat	Ashraf Helmy and El-Sayed Lashin (EGY)

== Group stage ==
=== Group A ===
Rank	Athlete	W	L	GW	GL	PW	PL	FRA	CAN	ARG
1	Damien Eloi and Christophe Legout (FRA)	2	0	4	1	96	80	X	2–1	2–0
2	Wenguan Johnny Huang and Kurt Liu (CAN)	1	1	3	3	115	102	1–2	X	2–1
3	Liu Song and Pablo Tabachnik (ARG)	0	2	1	4	73	102	0–2	1–2	X

=== Group B ===
Rank	Athlete	W	L	GW	GL	PW	PL	NED	NGR	IND
1	Danny Heister and Trinko Keen (NED)	2	0	4	1	96	86	X	2–1	2–0
2	Kazeem Nosiru and Segun Toriola (NGR)	1	1	3	3	119	117	1–2	X	2–1
3	Chetan Baboor and Raman Subramanyan (IND)	0	2	1	4	94	106	0–2	1–2	X

=== Group C ===
Rank	Athlete	W	L	GW	GL	PW	PL	HKG	GRE	AUS
1	Cheung Yuk and Leung Chu Yan (HKG)	2	0	4	1	98	79	X	2–1	2–0
2	Kalinikos Kreanga and Ntaniel Tsiokas (GRE)	1	1	3	2	91	82	1–2	X	2–0
3	Simon Gerada and Mark Smythe (AUS)	0	2	0	4	56	84	0–2	0–2	X

=== Group D ===
Rank	Athlete	W	L	GW	GL	PW	PL	DEN	JPN	USA
1	Michael Maze and Finn Tugwell (DEN)	2	0	4	0	84	42	X	2–0	2–0
2	Kōji Matsushita and Hiroshi Shibutani (JPN)	1	1	2	2	65	63	0–2	X	2–0
3	Cheng Yinghua and Khoa Dinh Nguyen (USA)	0	2	0	4	40	84	0–2	0–2	X

=== Group E ===
Rank	Athlete	W	L	GW	GL	PW	PL	JPN	BEL	CHI
1	Seiko Iseki and Toshio Tasaki (JPN)	2	0	4	0	84	39	X	2–0	2–0
2	Jean-Michel Saive and Philippe Saive (BEL)	1	1	2	2	63	74	0–2	X	2–0
3	Jorge Gambra and Augusto Morales (CHI)	0	2	0	4	50	84	0–2	0–2	X

=== Group F ===
Rank	Athlete	W	L	GW	GL	PW	PL	SWE	BLR	USA
1	Fredrik Håkansson and Peter Karlsson (SWE)	2	0	4	1	102	81	X	2–0	2–1
2	Vladimir Samsonov and Evgueni Chtchetinine (BLR)	1	1	2	2	83	78	0–2	X	2–0
3	Todd Sweeris and David Zhuang (USA)	0	2	1	4	72	98	1–2	0–2	X

=== Group G ===
Rank	Athlete	W	L	GW	GL	PW	PL	POL	BRA	CZE
1	Lucjan Błaszczyk and Tomasz Krzeszewski (POL)	2	0	4	0	84	57	X	2–0	2–0
2	Hugo Hoyama and Carlos Kawai Issamu (BRA)	1	1	2	2	70	76	0–2	X	2–0
3	Petr Korbel and Josef Plachy (CZE)	0	2	0	4	63	84	0–2	0–2	X

=== Group H ===
Rank	Athlete	W	L	GW	GL	PW	PL	YUG	GER	AUS
1	Slobodan Grujić and Ilija Lupulesku (YUG)	2	0	4	0	84	51	X	2–0	2–0
2	Timo Boll and Jörg Roßkopf (GER)	1	1	2	0	78	62	0–2	X	2–0
3	Brett Clarke and Jeff Plumb (AUS)	0	2	0	4	35	84	0–2	0–2	X

== Knockout stage ==
First round
1	Kong L (CHN); Liu G (CHN)	21	12	19	21	21
L Błaszczyk (POL); T Krzeszewski (POL)	16	21	21	18	18
S Grujić (YUG); I Lupulesku (YUG)	18	18	13
7	Kim T-s (KOR); Oh S-e (KOR)	21	21	21
5	K Jindrak (AUT); W Schlager (AUT)	22	21	21
D Heister (NED); T Keen (NED)	20	14	17
F Håkansson (SWE); P Karlsson (SWE)	17	21	11	18
4	P Chila (FRA); J-P Gatien (FRA)	21	10	21	21
3	Chang Y-s (TPE); Chiang P-l (TPE)	21	21	22
M Maze (DEN); F Tugwell (DEN)	19	15	20
Cheung Y (HKG); Leung CY (HKG)	16	21	21	9	15
8	Lee C-s (KOR); Ryu S-m (KOR)	21	16	19	21	21
6	J Persson (SWE); J-O Waldner (SWE)	18	21	18
D Eloi (FRA); C Legout (FRA)	21	23	21
S Iseki (JPN); T Tasaki (JPN)	18	16	6
2	Wang L (CHN); Yan S (CHN)	21	21	21

Quarterfinals
1	Kong L (CHN); Liu G (CHN)	21	21	10	21
7	Kim T-s (KOR); Oh S-e (KOR)	18	9	21	10
5	K Jindrak (AUT); W Schlager (AUT)	21	21	19	17	20
4	P Chila (FRA); J-P Gatien (FRA)	15	19	21	21	22
3	Chang Y-s (TPE); Chiang P-l (TPE)	21	15	21	21	18
8	Lee C-s (KOR); Ryu S-m (KOR)	13	21	10	23	21
D Eloi (FRA); C Legout (FRA)	6	13	19
2	Wang L (CHN); Yan S (CHN)	21	21	21

Semifinals
1	Kong L (CHN); Liu G (CHN)	21	22	21	21
4	P Chila (FRA); J-P Gatien (FRA)	12	24	10	10
8	Lee C-s (KOR); Ryu S-m (KOR)	12	19	21	18
2	Wang L (CHN); Yan S (CHN)	21	21	17	21

Gold medal match
1	Kong L (CHN); Liu G (CHN)	20	21	19	18
2	Wang L (CHN); Yan S (CHN)	22	17	21	21
Bronze medal match
4	P Chila (FRA); J-P Gatien (FRA)	22	21	22	21
8	Lee C-s (KOR); Ryu S-m (KOR)	20	23	20	10

== Competitors ==
Athlete	Nation	Eliminated
Wenguan Johnny Huang; Kurt Liu	Canada	Groups
Liu Song; Pablo Tabachnik	Argentina	Groups
Kazeem Nosiru; Segun Toriola	Nigeria	Groups
Chetan Baboor; Raman Subramanyam	India	Groups
Kalinikos Kreanga; Ntaniel Tsiokas	Greece	Groups
Simon Gerada; Mark Smythe	Australia	Groups
Koji Matsushita; Hiroshi Shibutani	Japan	Groups
Cheng Yinghua; Khoa Nguyen	United States	Groups
Jean-Michel Saive; Philippe Saive	Brazil	Groups
Jorge Gambra; Augusto Morales	Chile	Groups
Vladimir Samsonov; Evgueni Chtchetinine	Belarus	Groups
Todd Sweeris; David Zhuang	United States	Groups
Hugo Hoyama; Carlos Kawai Issamu	Brazil	Groups
Petr Korbel; Josef Plachy	Czech Republic	Groups
Timo Boll; Jörg Roßkopf	Germany	Groups
Brett Clarke; Jeff Plumb	Australia	Groups
Lucjan Blaszyzyk; Tomasz Krzeszewski	Poland	16
Slobodan Grujić; Ilija Lupulesku	FR Yugoslavia	16
Danny Heister; Trinko Keen	Netherlands	16
Fredrik Hakansson; Peter Karlsson	Sweden	16
Michael Maze; Finn Tugwell	Denmark	16
Cheung Yuk; Leung Chu Yan	Hong Kong	16
Jörgen Persson; Jan-Ove Walder	Sweden	16
Seiko Iseki; Toshio Tasaki	Japan	16
Kim Taek-soo; Oh Sang-Eun	South Korea	8
Karl Jindrak; Werner Schlager	Austria	8
Chang Yen-shu; Chiang Peng-lung	Chinese Taipei	8
Damien Eloi; Christophe Legout	France	8
Lee Chul-Seung; Ryu Seung-Min	South Korea	4
Patrick Chila; Jean-Philippe Gatien	France	3
Kong Linghui; Liu Guoliang	China	2
Wang Liqin; Yan Sen	China	1
