= Table tennis at the 1992 Summer Olympics – Men's doubles =

Table tennis at the Olympics

Table tennis – Men's doubles at the Games of the XXV Olympiad
- Venue: Estació del Nord Sports Hall
- Date: 28 July to 4 August 1992
- Competitors: 60 from 23 nations

Medalists
1st place, gold medalist(s)		Lü Lin; Wang Tao	China
2nd place, silver medalist(s)		Steffen Fetzner; Jörg Roßkopf	Germany
3rd place, bronze medalist(s)		Kang Hee-chan; Lee Chul-seung	South Korea
3rd place, bronze medalist(s)		Kim Taek-soo; Yoo Nam-kyu	South Korea

These are the results of the men's doubles competition, one of two events for male competitors in table tennis at the 1992 Summer Olympics in Barcelona.

== Group stage ==
=== Group A ===
Rank	Athlete	W	L	GW	GL	PW	PL	KOR	SWE	AUT
1	Kang Hee-Chan and Lee Chul-Seung (KOR)	2	0	4	1	102	76	X	2–1	2–0
2	Erik Lindh and Jörgen Persson (SWE)	1	1	3	2	96	93	1–2	X	2–0
3	Erich Amplatz and Ding Yi (AUT)	0	2	0	4	55	84	0–2	0–2	X

=== Group B ===
Rank	Athlete	W	L	GW	GL	PW	PL	CHN	CRO	PRK	PER
1	Lü Lin and Wang Tao (CHN)	3	0	6	1	142	86	X	2–1	2–0	2–0
2	Zoran Primorac and Dragutin Šurbek (CRO)	2	1	5	2	123	116	1–2	X	2–0	2–0
3	Choi Gyong-Sob and Li Gun-Sang (PRK)	1	2	2	4	96	107	0–2	0–2	X	2–0
4	Walter Nathan and Yair Nathan (PER)	0	3	0	6	74	126	0–2	0–2	0–2	X

=== Group C ===
Rank	Athlete	W	L	GW	GL	PW	PL	GER	JPN	FRA	CHI
1	Steffen Fetzner and Jörg Roßkopf (GER)	3	0	6	0	128	99	X	2–0	2–0	2–0
2	Kōji Matsushita and Hiroshi Shibutani (JPN)	2	1	4	2	117	82	0–2	X	2–0	2–0
3	Nicolas Chatelain and Patrick Chila (FRA)	1	2	2	4	105	110	0–2	0–2	X	2–0
4	Angusto G. Morales and Marcos Núñez (CHI)	0	3	0	6	67	126	0–2	0–2	0–2	X

=== Group D ===
Rank	Athlete	W	L	GW	GL	PW	PL	KOR	BEL	BRA
1	Kim Taek-Soo and Yoo Nam-Kyu (KOR)	2	0	4	0	84	50	X	2–0	2–0
2	Jean-Michel Saive and Philippe Saive (BEL)	1	1	2	2	68	65	0–2	X	2–0
3	Hugo Hoyama and Claudio Kano (BRA)	0	2	0	4	47	84	0–2	0–2	X

=== Group E ===
Rank	Athlete	W	L	GW	GL	PW	PL	IOP	SWE	JPN	IND
1	Slobodan Grujić and Ilija Lupulesku (IOP)	3	0	6	1	137	120	X	2–1	2–0	2–0
2	Mikael Appelgren and Jan-Ove Waldner (SWE)	2	1	5	2	143	115	1–2	X	2–0	2–0
3	Kinjiro Nakamura and Takehiro Watanabe (JPN)	1	2	2	4	99	116	0–2	0–2	X	2–0
4	Kamlesh Mehta and Sujay Ghorpade (IND)	0	3	0	6	98	126	0–2	0–2	0–2	X

=== Group F ===
Rank	Athlete	W	L	GW	GL	PW	PL	EUN	PRK	ESP	USA
1	Andrei Mazounov and Dmitry Mazunov (EUN)	3	0	6	1	142	116	X	2–1	2–0	2–0
2	Kim Jin-Myong and Kim Song-hui (PRK)	2	1	5	2	144	130	1–2	X	2–0	2–0
3	Roberto Casares and José María Pales (ESP)	1	2	2	5	118	142	0–2	0–2	X	2–1
4	Jim Butler and Sean Patrick O'Neill (USA)	0	3	1	6	129	145	0–2	0–2	1–2	X

=== Group G ===
Rank	Athlete	W	L	GW	GL	PW	PL	CHN	GBR	NGR	CUB
1	Ma Wenge and Yu Shentong (CHN)	3	0	6	1	142	98	X	2–0	2–1	2–0
2	Alan Cooke and Carl Prean (GBR)	2	1	4	3	136	115	0–2	X	2–0	2–1
3	Oluyomi Bankole and Segun Toriola (NGR)	1	2	3	4	123	139	1–2	0–2	X	2–0
4	Ruben Arado and Santiago Roque (CUB)	0	3	1	6	97	146	0–2	1–2	0–2	X

=== Group H ===
Rank	Athlete	W	L	GW	GL	PW	PL	FRA	POL	NGR	NZL
1	Damien Éloi and Jean-Philippe Gatien (FRA)	3	0	6	1	143	119	X	2–1	2–0	2–0
2	Andrzej Grubba and Leszek Kucharski (POL)	2	1	5	2	143	107	1–2	X	2–0	2–0
3	Atanda Musa and Sule Olaleye (NGR)	1	2	2	4	98	112	0–2	0–2	X	2–0
4	Hagen John Bower and Peter Jackson (NZL)	0	3	0	6	80	126	0–2	0–2	0–2	X

== Knockout stage ==
Quarterfinals
A1	Kang Hee-chan (KOR); Lee Chul-seung (KOR)	21	21	14	17	21
G1	Ma Wenge (CHN); Yu Shentong (CHN)	18	9	21	21	18
E1	Slobodan Grujić (IOP); Ilija Lupulesku (IOP)	18	13	17
C1	Steffen Fetzner (GER); Jörg Roßkopf (GER)	21	21	21
D1	Kim Taek-soo (KOR); Yoo Nam-kyu (KOR)	21	26	21
F1	Andrei Mazunov (EUN); Dmitry Mazunov (EUN)	15	24	15
H1	Damien Eloi (FRA); Jean-Philippe Gatien (FRA)	14	21	13	20
B1	Lü Lin (CHN); Wang Tao (CHN)	21	18	21	22

Semifinals
A1	Kang Hee-chan (KOR); Lee Chul-seung (KOR)	15	22	20
C1	Steffen Fetzner (GER); Jörg Roßkopf (GER)	21	24	22
D1	Kim Taek-soo (KOR); Yoo Nam-kyu (KOR)	21	17	13	15
B1	Lü Lin (CHN); Wang Tao (CHN)	13	21	21	21

Gold medal match
C1	Steffen Fetzner (GER); Jörg Roßkopf (GER)	24	21	18	21	14
B1	Lü Lin (CHN); Wang Tao (CHN)	26	18	21	13	21
