= 2007 World Table Tennis Championships – Men's singles =

Men's singles at the 2007 World Table Tennis Championships
- Venue: Dom Sportova
- Location: Zagreb, Croatia
- Dates: 21 May – 27 May
- Final score: 4–11, 8–11, 11–5, 4–11, 11–9, 11–8, 11–6

Medalists
gold medal	Wang Liqin	China
silver medal	Ma Lin	China
bronze medal	Wang Hao	China
bronze medal	Ryu Seung-min	South Korea

The 2007 World Table Tennis Championships men's singles event took place in Zagreb, Croatia, between 21 and 27 May 2007. The tournament was won by Wang Liqin of China.

== Seeds ==
1. (China) Ma Lin (final)
2. (China) Wang Liqin (champion)
3. (Germany) Timo Boll (quarterfinals)
4. (China) Wang Hao (semifinals)
5. (South Korea) Oh Sang-eun (fourth round)
6. (Belarus) Vladimir Samsonov (quarterfinals)
7. (China) Chen Qi (fourth round)
8. (China) Ma Long (fourth round)
9. (South Korea) Ryu Seung-min (semifinals)
10. (China) Hao Shuai (quarterfinals)
11. (Austria) Werner Schlager (first round)
12. (Hong Kong) Li Ching (second round)
13. (China) Hou Yingchao (fourth round)
14. (South Korea) Joo Sae-hyuk (quarterfinals)
15. (Greece) Kalinikos Kreanga (fourth round)
16. (Chinese Taipei) Chuang Chih-yuan (fourth round)
17. (Austria) Chen Weixing (third round)
18. (Russia) Alexey Smirnov (first round)
19. (Denmark) Michael Maze (second round)
20. (Czech Republic) Petr Korbel (first round)
21. (South Korea) Lee Jung-woo (third round)
22. (Hong Kong) Ko Lai Chak (second round)
23. (Singapore) Gao Ning (fourth round)
24. (Japan) Yo Kan (third round)
25. (Romania) Adrian Crișan (first round)
26. (Croatia) Zoran Primorac (first round)
27. (Hong Kong) Cheung Yuk (second round)
28. (Poland) Lucjan Błaszczyk (second round)
29. (Chinese Taipei) Chiang Peng-lung (third round)
30. (Singapore) Yang Zi (second round)
31. (Belgium) Jean-Michel Saive (third round)
32. (France) Damien Éloi (first round)

== Finals ==
Quarterfinals
1	(China) Ma Lin	11	11	12	9	11
6	(Belarus) Vladimir Samsonov	9	7	10	11	6
14	(South Korea) Joo Se-Hyuk	4	9	3	3
4	(China) Wang Hao	11	11	11	11
3	(Germany) Timo Boll	9	7	3	12
9	(South Korea) Ryu Seung-Min	11	11	11	14
10	(China) Hao Shuai	7	5	8	8
2	(China) Wang Liqin	11	11	11	11

Semifinals
1	(China) Ma Lin	6	11	12	4	11	11
4	(China) Wang Hao	11	9	10	11	9	6
9	(South Korea) Ryu Seung-Min	11	3	7	16	6	12	7
2	(China) Wang Liqin	6	11	11	14	11	10	11

Final
1	(China) Ma Lin	11	11	5	11	9	8	6
2	(China) Wang Liqin	4	8	11	4	11	11	11

== Main draw ==
=== Top half ===
==== Section 1 ====
First round
1	(China) Ma L	11	11	6	11	11
(Poland) Z Y Wang	2	6	11	3	9
(Poland) D Gorak	11	10	6	8	5
(Germany) D Ovtcharov	9	12	11	11	11
(Spain) Z W He	8	11	9	11	11	11
(Hungary) D Zwickl	11	8	11	9	6	5
(Nigeria) S Toriola	3	10	11	11	13	11
18	(Russia) A Smirnov	11	12	8	6	11	4
20	(Czech Republic) P Korbel	9	4	7	4
(Japan) K Matsudaira	11	11	11	11
(Chinese Taipei) Wu C-C	3	11	11	8	11	8	6
(Hong Kong) Leung C Y	11	7	9	11	8	11	11
(France) P Chila	11	11	12	11
(Chile) J Papic	4	4	10	7
(Slovakia) L Pistej	11	11	4	11	11
11	(Austria) W Schlager	5	5	11	6	3

Second round
1	(China) Ma L	11	11	11	11
(Germany) D Ovtcharov	9	9	8	6
(Spain) Z W He	11	11	11	11
(Nigeria) S Toriola	7	9	8	5
(Japan) K Matsudaira	11	9	11	8	12	11	4
(Hong Kong) Leung C Y	7	11	13	11	10	5	11
(France) P Chila	13	11	10	11	11
(Slovakia) L Pistej	11	4	12	7	4

Third round
1	(China) Ma L	11	15	11	11
(Spain) Z W He	8	13	9	8
(Hong Kong) Leung C Y	8	11	13	11	11
(France) P Chila	11	6	11	9	7

Fourth round
1	(China) Ma L	11	9	11	11	11
(Hong Kong) Leung C Y	9	11	3	9	7

==== Section 2 ====
First round
12	(Hong Kong) Li C	11	11	11	11
(Slovenia) S Lasan	4	8	9	7
(Japan) J Mizutani	7	11	12	12	9	11
(Serbia) S Grujić	11	7	10	10	11	9
(Austria) R Gardos	9	11	11	7	11	11
(Brazil) C Matsumoto	11	5	9	11	6	7
(South Korea) Kim J-H	6	6	4	6
23	(Singapore) Gao N	11	11	11	11
17	(Austria) W Chen	11	11	11	11
(Czech Republic) T Konecny	6	5	7	6
(Brazil) H Hoyama	11	6	8	6	10
(Sweden) J Persson	8	11	11	11	12
(Serbia) A Karakašević	9	5	9	11	11	7
(Singapore) Cai X	11	11	11	6	5	11
(Denmark) C Kongsgaard	9	11	1	8	6
6	(Belarus) V Samsonov	11	9	11	11	11

Second round
12	(Hong Kong) Li C	9	7	10	3
(Japan) J Mizutani	11	11	12	11
(Austria) R Gardos	12	11	9	11	8	7	5
23	(Singapore) Gao N	10	8	11	7	11	11	11
17	(Austria) W Chen	11	11	11	11	11	11
(Sweden) J Persson	9	13	4	13	9	6
(Singapore) Cai X	10	5	11	1
6	(Belarus) V Samsonov	12	11	13	11

Third round
(Japan) J Mizutani	13	11	14	7	7	8	4
23	(Singapore) Gao N	11	5	12	11	11	11	11
17	(Austria) W Chen	2	12	8	5	8
6	(Belarus) V Samsonov	11	10	11	11	11

Fourth round
23	(Singapore) Gao N	11	11	5	11	4	11	3
6	(Belarus) V Samsonov	13	8	11	6	11	8	11

==== Section 3 ====
First round
8	(China) Ma L	11	11	11	11
(Russia) K Skachkov	2	6	4	3
(Spain) M Duran	10	6	7	11	4
(Slovenia) B Tokič	12	11	11	8	11
(Germany) C Süß	10	11	11	4	6	11	11
(Portugal) T Apolonia	12	8	9	11	11	9	3
(Australia) W Henzell	10	2	8	6
27	(Hong Kong) Cheung Y	12	11	11	11
31	(Belgium) J-M Saive	7	11	11	9	12	11
(Portugal) E Mendes	11	6	3	11	10	4
(Portugal) M Freitas	11	5	11	6	6	11	11
(Sweden) J Lundqvist	5	11	7	11	11	5	9
(Chinese Taipei) Chang Y-S	11	9	9	8	10
(Italy) S Tomasi	8	11	11	11	12
(North Korea) Kim H-B	8	11	11	15	7	9
14	(South Korea) Joo S-H	11	6	13	13	11	11

Second round
8	(China) Ma L	11	11	4	12	9	11
(Slovenia) B Tokič	5	6	11	10	11	5
(Germany) C Süß	11	12	5	11	11
27	(Hong Kong) Cheung Y	9	10	11	6	7
31	(Belgium) J-M Saive	11	4	8	11	6	11	11
(Portugal) M Freitas	8	11	11	6	11	3	7
(Italy) S Tomasi	5	8	11	7	3
14	(South Korea) Joo S-H	11	11	9	11	11

Third round
8	(China) Ma L	11	11	11	11
(Germany) C Süß	8	5	9	5
31	(Belgium) J-M Saive	9	11	10	7	5
14	(South Korea) Joo S-H	11	6	12	11	11

Fourth round
8	(China) Ma L	11	11	9	9	10	6
14	(South Korea) Joo S-H	5	7	11	11	12	11

==== Section 4 ====
First round
16	(Chinese Taipei) Chuang C-Y	7	11	11	11	11
(Egypt) A A Saleh	11	6	2	9	8
(Romania) A Filimon	12	11	11	5	11
(Japan) K Matsushita	10	9	6	11	6
(Italy) M Yang	11	11	10	8	11	9	11
(India) S Saha	8	2	12	11	8	11	7
(Hungary) J Jakab	11	8	11	8	11	11
32	(France) D Eloi	7	11	6	11	9	9
30	(Singapore) Yang Z	11	11	11	11
(Sweden) J Persson	6	6	5	7
(Canada) P Peter-Paul	6	4	8	8
(Germany) B Steger	11	11	11	11
(Greece) P Gionis	7	11	11	11	11
(Egypt) E-S Lashin	11	4	4	6	6
(Russia) I Rubtsov	3	6	8	7
4	(China) Wang H	11	11	11	11

Second round
16	(Chinese Taipei) Chuang C-Y	11	11	8	11	8	11
(Romania) A Filimon	6	6	11	4	11	6
(Italy) M Yang	8	8	7	12	10
(Hungary) J Jakab	11	11	11	10	12
30	(Singapore) Yang Z	7	11	11	11	11	6	6
(Germany) B Steger	11	8	6	9	13	11	11
(Greece) P Gionis	10	11	10	9	14
4	(China) Wang H	12	8	12	11	16

Third round
16	(Chinese Taipei) Chuang C-Y	11	11	12	11	13
(Hungary) J Jakab	9	6	10	13	11
(Germany) B Steger	9	6	6	6
4	(China) Wang H	11	11	11	11

Fourth round
16	(Chinese Taipei) Chuang C-Y	13	12	11	8	9	11	2
4	(China) Wang H	15	10	8	11	11	8	11

=== Bottom half ===
==== Section 5 ====
First round
3	(Germany) T Boll	11	11	11	11
(Brazil) T Monteiro	6	4	5	6
(Sweden) R Svensson	7	11	9	11	9	11	13
(Hungary) F Pazsy	11	8	11	3	11	8	11
(Dominican Republic) J Lin	11	11	11	11
(Wales) A Robertson	8	2	9	3
(Vietnam) Tran T Q	8	8	8	8
22	(Hong Kong) Ko L C	11	11	11	11
24	(Japan) Y Kan	11	11	5	11	11
(Ukraine) Y Zhmudenko	9	7	11	4	5
(Slovakia) E Illas	10	10	11	13	7	5
(Germany) J Roßkopf	12	11	8	11	11	11
(Croatia) R Tan	11	11	8	11	11
(North Korea) Ri C-G	8	7	11	5	9
(Vietnam) Doan K Q	12	7	11	3	5	8
15	(Greece) K Kreanga	10	11	8	11	11	11

Second round
3	(Germany) T Boll	11	7	11	11	9	11
(Sweden) R Svensson	9	11	6	6	11	3
(Dominican Republic) J Lin	11	8	11	4	11	9	11
22	(Hong Kong) Ko L C	9	11	9	11	7	11	8
24	(Japan) Y Kan	10	11	12	12	11	11
(Germany) J Roßkopf	12	6	10	14	9	7
(Croatia) R Tan	9	7	13	4	7
15	(Greece) K Kreanga	11	11	11	11	11

Third round
3	(Germany) T Boll	11	11	4	11	11
(Dominican Republic) J Lin	7	3	11	7	7
24	(Japan) Y Kan	11	11	4	5	8	6
15	(Greece) K Kreanga	6	4	11	11	11	11

Fourth round
3	(Germany) T Boll	11	8	11	15	11
15	(Greece) K Kreanga	6	11	4	13	4

==== Section 6 ====
First round
9	(South Korea) Ryu S-M	11	11	15	9	11
(Czech Republic) J Kleprlik	4	3	13	11	3
(France) E Lebesson	6	11	6	8	8
(Russia) F Kuzmin	11	9	11	11	11
(Slovakia) P Sereda	8	11	14	7	11	9
(Russia) G Vlasov	11	6	16	11	3	11
(South Korea) Lee J-S	11	11	6	12	13
26	(Croatia) Z Primorac	9	9	11	10	11
19	(Denmark) M Maze	11	11	11	4	8	11
(Spain) V Sanchez	4	3	6	11	11	5
(India) S Roy	9	3	6	12	5
(France) C Legout	11	11	11	10	11
(Croatia) R Tosic	12	11	11	6	3	12
(Spain) A Carneros	10	9	8	11	11	10
(Brazil) G Tsuboi	5	7	3	7
5	(South Korea) Oh S-E	11	11	11	11

Second round
9	(South Korea) Ryu S-M	11	14	9	12	12	11
(Russia) F Kuzmin	9	16	11	10	10	6
(Russia) G Vlasov	8	10	11	11	11	5	9
(South Korea) Lee J-S	11	12	8	9	8	11	11
19	(Denmark) M Maze	7	3	5	7
(France) C Legout	11	11	11	11
(Croatia) R Tosic	5	11	9	11	5	4
5	(South Korea) Oh S-E	11	7	11	6	11	11

Third round
9	(South Korea) Ryu S-M	7	11	11	9	8	11	11
(South Korea) Lee J-S	11	7	7	11	11	7	9
(France) C Legout	11	11	5	8	5
5	(South Korea) Oh S-E	13	9	11	11	11

Fourth round
9	(South Korea) Ryu S-M	8	12	11	3	10	11	11
5	(South Korea) Oh S-E	11	10	9	11	12	9	7

==== Section 7 ====
First round
7	(China) Chen Q	11	11	11	11
(Croatia) R Redjep	6	6	7	3
(England) D Reed	5	11	7	11	11
(Netherlands) T Keen	11	9	11	13	13
(Slovakia) T Keinath	14	8	10	8	11	6
(Hungary) P Fazekas	12	11	12	11	7	11
(Austria) D Habesohn	15	9	14	3	8	13	8
29	(Chinese Taipei) Chiang P-L	13	11	12	11	11	11	11
21	(South Korea) Lee J-w	11	11	9	11	12	11
(Nigeria) M Merotohun	4	5	11	5	14	9
(Portugal) J Monteiro	7	11	12	10	11	3
(Hong Kong) Tang P	11	9	14	12	9	11
(South Korea) Cho E-R	11	7	11	6	6	11	7
(Japan) S Kishikawa	9	11	7	11	11	6	11
(Poland) J Kosowski	4	5	6	5
10	(China) Hao S	11	11	11	11

Second round
7	(China) Chen Q	9	4	11	13	11	11
(Netherlands) T Keen	11	11	5	11	4	5
(Hungary) P Fazekas	11	5	12	11	8	6
29	(Chinese Taipei) Chiang P-L	13	11	10	8	11	11
21	(South Korea) Lee J-w	12	6	11	11	7	10	11
(Hong Kong) Tang P	10	11	7	5	11	12	5
(Japan) S Kishikawa	9	5	9	8
10	(China) Hao S	11	11	11	11

Third round
7	(China) Chen Q	11	11	11	11
29	(Chinese Taipei) Chiang P-L	5	6	8	8
21	(South Korea) Lee J-w	9	13	11	8	5
10	(China) Hao S	11	15	0	11	11

Fourth round
7	(China) Chen Q	7	11	12	13	12	9	9
10	(China) Hao S	11	7	14	11	10	11	11

==== Section 8 ====
First round
13	(China) Hou Y	11	11	11	13
(Poland) B Such	5	8	2	11
(Ukraine) O Didukh	11	8	4	9	12
(Norway) J Wang	5	11	11	11	14
(Sweden) F Håkansson	11	11	11	11
(Norway) G Erlandsen	7	8	8	9
(Denmark) F Tugwell	11	3	11	11	7	11
25	(Romania) A Crişan	8	11	9	9	11	7
28	(Poland) L Blaszczyk	11	11	11	11
(India) Achanta S K	8	6	9	9
(Germany) P Baum	6	14	3	11	11	4	9
(Argentina) S Liu	11	12	11	9	9	11	11
(Netherlands) D Heister	12	5	11	9	9	4
(Belgium) P Saive	10	11	7	11	11	11
(Chinese Taipei) Chiang H-C	7	7	5	9
2	(China) Wang L	11	11	11	11

Second round
13	(China) Hou Y	11	11	11	13
(Norway) J Wang	3	3	5	11
(Sweden) F Håkansson	15	11	6	9	11	11	11
(Denmark) F Tugwell	13	9	11	11	8	13	7
28	(Poland) L Blaszczyk	5	11	8	10	13	7
(Argentina) S Liu	11	7	11	12	11	11
(Belgium) P Saive	9	3	1	9
2	(China) Wang L	11	11	11	11

Third round
13	(China) Hou Y	2	13	11	11	11
(Sweden) F Håkansson	11	11	5	9	6
(Argentina) S Liu	7	5	3	9
2	(China) Wang L	11	11	11	11

Fourth round
13	(China) Hou Y	9	9	7	6
2	(China) Wang L	11	11	11	11
