= 1997 World Table Tennis Championships =

1997 edition of the World Table Tennis Championships

The 1997 World Table Tennis Championships were held in Manchester from April 24 to May 5, 1997. This event was notable as the winner Jan-Ove Waldner won without losing a single set in all matches played, this was the first time that this occurred.

== Results ==
=== Team ===
Event	Gold	Silver	Bronze
Swaythling Cup; Men's Team	China; Ding Song; Kong Linghui; Liu Guoliang; Ma Wenge; Wang Tao	France; Nicolas Chatelain; Patrick Chila; Damien Eloi; Jean-Philippe Gatien; Christophe Legout	South Korea; Chu Kyo-sung; Kim Taek-soo; Lee Chul-seung; Oh Sang-eun; Yoo Nam-kyu
Corbillon Cup; Women's Team	China; Deng Yaping; Li Ju; Wang Chen; Wang Nan; Yang Ying	North Korea; Kim Hyon-hui; Tu Jong-sil; Wi Bok-Sun	Germany; Christina Fischer; Olga Nemeș; Elke Schall; Jie Schöpp; Nicole Struse

=== Individual ===
Event	Gold	Silver	Bronze
Men's singles	(Sweden) Jan-Ove Waldner	(Belarus) Vladimir Samsonov	(China) Yan Sen
Men's singles	(Sweden) Jan-Ove Waldner	(Belarus) Vladimir Samsonov	(China) Kong Linghui
Women's singles	(China) Deng Yaping	(China) Wang Nan	(China) Li Ju
Women's singles	(China) Deng Yaping	(China) Wang Nan	(China) Wu Na
Men's doubles	(China) Kong Linghui (China) Liu Guoliang	(Sweden) Jörgen Persson (Sweden) Jan-Ove Waldner	(France) Damien Eloi (France) Jean-Philippe Gatien
Men's doubles	(China) Kong Linghui (China) Liu Guoliang	(Sweden) Jörgen Persson (Sweden) Jan-Ove Waldner	(Japan) Kōji Matsushita (Japan) Hiroshi Shibutani
Women's doubles	(China) Deng Yaping (China) Yang Ying	(China) Li Ju (China) Wang Nan	(Hong Kong) Chai Po Wa (China) Qiao Yunping
Women's doubles	(China) Deng Yaping (China) Yang Ying	(China) Li Ju (China) Wang Nan	(China) Cheng Hongxia (China) Wang Hui
Mixed doubles	(China) Liu Guoliang (China) Wu Na	(China) Kong Linghui (China) Deng Yaping	(China) Wang Liqin (China) Wang Nan
Mixed doubles	(China) Liu Guoliang (China) Wu Na	(China) Kong Linghui (China) Deng Yaping	(Chinese Taipei) Chiang Peng-lung (Chinese Taipei) Chen Jing
