= 1999 World Table Tennis Championships – Men's doubles =

1999 Men's doubles

The 1999 World Table Tennis Championships men's doubles was the 45th edition of the men's doubles championship. Kong Linghui and Liu Guoliang won the title after defeating Wang Liqin and Yan Sen in the final by three sets to two.

== Results ==
Round of 16
(China) Kong Linghui (China) Liu Guoliang	8	21	21
(France) Christophe Legoût (France) Damien Éloi	21	13	11
(Japan) Kōji Matsushita (Japan) Hiroshi Shibutani	15	16
(Austria) Werner Schlager (Austria) Karl Jindrak	21	21
(Belarus) Vladimir Samsonov (Croatia) Zoran Primorac	21	21
(Greece) Kalinikos Kreanga (Serbia) Slobodan Grujić	15	16
(Netherlands) Trinko Keen (Netherlands) Danny Heister	16	18
(China) Tan Ruiwu (Hong Kong) Leung Chu Yan	21	21
(Poland) Lucjan Błaszczyk (Poland) Tomasz Krzeszewski	21	21
(Norway) Geir Erlandsen (Norway) Istvan Moldovan	17	16
(South Korea) Kim Taek-soo (South Korea) Park Sang-joon	12	21	21
(France) Jean-Philippe Gatien (France) Patrick Chila	21	19	19
(Chinese Taipei) Chiang Peng-lung (Chinese Taipei) Chang Yuan-Su	21	25
(Germany) Jörg Roßkopf (Germany) Steffen Fetzner	13	23
(China) Wang Liqin (China) Yan Sen	21	21
(Austria) Qian Qianli (Austria) Kostadin Lengerov	11	13

Quarterfinals
(China) Kong Linghui (China) Liu Guoliang	21	21	19	15	25
(Austria) Schlager (Austria) Jindrak	19	15	21	21	23
(Belarus) Samsonov (Croatia) Primorac	14	21	21	21
(China) Tan Ruiwu (Hong Kong) Leung Chu Yan	21	13	14	18
(Poland) Błaszczyk (Poland) Krzeszewski	10	9	18
(South Korea) Kim Taek-soo (South Korea) Park Sang-joon	21	21	21
(Chinese Taipei) Chiang Peng-lung (Chinese Taipei) Chang Yuan-Su	22	21	15	18
(China) Wang Liqin (China) Yan Sen	24	16	21	21

Semifinals
(China) Kong Linghui (China) Liu Guoliang	21	9	21	24
(Belarus) Samsonov (Croatia) Primorac	16	21	18	22
(South Korea) Kim Taek-soo (South Korea) Park Sang-joon	18	21	12
(China) Wang Liqin (China) Yan Sen	21	23	21

Final
(China) Kong Linghui (China) Liu Guoliang	19	21	18	21	21
(China) Wanq Liqing (China) Yan Sen	21	16	21	10	18

== See also ==
List of World Table Tennis Championships medalists
