= 1997 World Table Tennis Championships – Men's team =

1997 Swaythling Cup (men's team)

The 1997 World Table Tennis Championships – Swaythling Cup (men's team) was the 44th edition of the men's team championship.

China won the gold medal defeating France 3–1 in the final. South Korea won the bronze medal defeating Germany in the bronze medal play off.

== Medalists ==
Event	Gold	Silver	Bronze
	China; Ding Song; Kong Linghui; Liu Guoliang; Ma Wenge; Wang Tao	France; Nicolas Chatelain; Patrick Chila; Damien Eloi; Jean-Philippe Gatien; Christophe Legout	South Korea; Chu Kyo-sung; Kim Taek-soo; Lee Chul-seung; Oh Sang-eun; Yoo Nam-kyu

== Final stage knockout phase ==
=== Quarter finals ===
Team One	Team Two	Score
Germany	Greece	3–1
China	Sweden	3–1
France	Belgium	3–2
South Korea	Japan	3–2

=== Semifinals ===
Team One	Team Two	Score
France	Germany	3-?
China	South Korea	3–1

=== Third-place playoff ===
Team One	Team Two	Score
South Korea	Germany	3–0

=== Final ===
China 3		France 1	Score
Kong Linghui	bt	Gatien	18–21 21–16 21–17
Liu Guoliang	lost to	Chila	17–21 21–15 10–21
Wang Tao	bt	Eloi	21–10 31–29
Liu Guoliang	bt	Gatien	21–19 21–14

== See also ==
- List of World Table Tennis Championships medalists
