= 1997 World Table Tennis Championships – Women's team =

1997 Corbillon Cup (women's team)

The 1997 World Table Tennis Championships – Corbillon Cup (women's team) was the 37th edition of the women's team championship.

China won the gold medal defeating North Korea 3–0 in the final, Germany won the bronze medal.

== Medalists ==
Event	Gold	Silver	Bronze
	China; Deng Yaping; Li Ju; Wang Chen; Wang Nan; Yang Ying	North Korea; Kim Hyon-hui; Tu Jong-sil; Wi Bok-Sun	Germany; Christina Fischer; Olga Nemeș; Elke Schall; Jie Schöpp; Nicole Struse

== Final stage knockout phase ==
=== Last 16 ===
Team One	Team Two	Score
Germany		
China		
North Korea	Croatia	3–0
South Korea		
Hong Kong	Hungary	3–1
Sweden	Russia	3–2
Romania		
Japan	Belarus	3–0

=== Quarter finals ===
Team One	Team Two	Score
Germany	Sweden	3–2
China	Hong Kong	3–0
North Korea	Romania	3–2
South Korea	Japan	3–2

=== Semifinals ===
Team One	Team Two	Score
North Korea	South Korea	3–0
China	Germany	3–0

=== Third-place playoff ===
Team One	Team Two	Score
Germany	South Korea	3–1

== Final ==
China 3		North Korea 0	Score
Yang Ying	bt	Wi Bok-Sun	22–20 21–16
Deng Yaping	bt	Kim Hyon-hui	21–15 21–14
Li Ju	bt	Tu Jong Sil	21–18 21–14

== See also ==
List of World Table Tennis Championships medalists
