= 1999 World Table Tennis Championships – Mixed doubles =

1999 Mixed doubles

The 1999 World Table Tennis Championships mixed doubles was the 45th edition of the mixed doubles championship.

Ma Lin and Zhang Yingying defeated Feng Zhe and Sun Jin in the final by three sets to one.

== Results ==
Round of 16
(China) Wang Liqin (China) Wang Nan	21	21
(South Korea) Park Sang-joon (South Korea) Seok Eun-mi	7	12
(China) Tan Ruiwu (China) Zhang Yining	21	13	21
(Germany) Timo Boll (Germany) Nicole Struse	13	21	16
(China) Ma Lin (China) Zhang Yingying	21	21
(Chinese Taipei) Chiang Peng-lung (Chinese Taipei) Cheng Jing	15	17
(China) Liu Guozheng (China) Li Nan	21	14	21
(South Korea) Lee Chul-seung (South Korea) Ryu Ji-hae	11	21	10
(China) Yan Sen (China) Zhang Hui	21	21
(Serbia) Slobodan Grujić (Romania) Otilia Bădescu	17	7
(China) Qin Zhijian (China) Yang Ying	21	21
(South Korea) Yoo Nam-kyu (South Korea) Park Hae-jung	10	11
(China) Feng Zhe (China) Sun Jin	21	21
(Hungary) Zoltan Bátorfi (Hungary) Krisztina Tóth	16	15
(China) Guo Keli (China) Lin Ling	21	11	21
(China) Liu Guoliang (China) Li Ju	16	21	19

Quarterfinals
(China) Wang Liqin (China) Wang Nan	21	21	21
(China) Tan Ruiwu (China) Zhang Yining	13	9	18
(China) Ma Lin (China) Zhang Yingying	21	21	21
(China) Liu Guozheng (China) Li Nan	14	18	14
(China) Yan Sen (China) Zhang Hui	17	15	15
(China) Qin Zhijian (China) Yang Ying	21	21	21
(China) Feng Zhe (China) Sun Jin	21	21	22	21	21
(China) Guo Keli (China) Lin Ling	11	23	20	7	18

Semifinals
(China) Wang Liqin (China) Wang Nan	21	21	12	11	13
(China) Ma Lin (China) Zhang Yingying	13	8	21	21	21
(China) Qin Zhijian (China) Yang Ying	19	19	6
(China) Feng Zhe (China) Sun Jin	21	21	21

Final
(China) Ma Lin (China) Zhang Yingying	21	21	9	21
(China) Feng Zhe (China) Sun Jin	15	19	21	15

== See also ==
List of World Table Tennis Championships medalists
