= 1995 World Table Tennis Championships – Women's doubles =

1995 Women's doubles

The 1995 World Table Tennis Championships women's doubles was the 42nd edition of the women's doubles championship. Deng Yaping and Qiao Hong defeated Liu Wei and Qiao Yunping in the final by three sets to one.

== Results ==
Round of 16
(China) Liu Wei (China) Qiao Yunping	21	12	21
(Romania) Otilia Bădescu (Romania) Emilia Elena Ciosu	16	21	19
(Sweden) Marie Svensson (Sweden) Åsa Svensson	16	16
(Russia) Irina Palina (Russia) Elena Timina	21	21
(China) Chen Zihe (Japan) Rika Sato	21	10	21
(Chinese Taipei) Chen Jing (Chinese Taipei) Chen Chiu Tan	10	21	16
(Hungary) Krisztina Tóth (Hungary) Csilla Bátorfi	21	21
(South Korea) Park Kyung-Ae (South Korea) Kim Moo-kyo	13	19
(Hong Kong) Chai Po Wa (Hong Kong) Chan Tan Lui	21	21
(Netherlands) Bettine Vriesekoop (Netherlands) Mirjam Hooman	11	9
(China) Wang Chen (China) Wu Na	21	21
(Germany) Nicole Struse (Germany) Elke Schall	13	10
(South Korea) Park Hae-jung (South Korea) Ryu Ji-hae	21	21
(Japan) Fumie Kawano (Japan) Keiko Okazaki	15	15
(China) Deng Yaping (China) Qiao Hong	21	21
(Chinese Taipei) Xu Jing (Chinese Taipei) Tang Fei-Ming	14	20

Quarterfinals
(China) Liu Wei (China) Qiao Yunping	21	21	21
(Russia) Palina (Russia) Timina	13	10	12
(China) Chen Zihe (Japan) Sato	16	21	19	17
(Hungary) Tóth (Hungary) Bátorfi	21	13	21	21
(Hong Kong) Chai Po Wa (Hong Kong) Chan Tan Lui	18	16	6
(China) Wang Chen (China) Wu Na	21	21	21
(South Korea) Park Hae-jung (South Korea) Ryu Ji-hae	20	17	19
(China) Deng Yaping (China) Qiao Hong	22	21	21

Semifinals
(China) Liu Wei (China) Qiao Yunping	18	21	21	21
(Hungary) Tóth (Hungary) Bátorfi	21	17	19	16
(China) Wang Chen (China) Wu Na	21	22	11	18	9
(China) Deng Yaping (China) Qiao Hong	14	10	21	21	21

Final
(China) Liu Wei (China) Qiao Yunping	19	17	21	19
(China) Deng Yaping (China) Qiao Hong	21	21	17	21

== See also ==
List of World Table Tennis Championships medalists
