= 1999 World Table Tennis Championships =

1999 edition of the World Table Tennis Championships

The 1999 World Table Tennis Championships were held in Eindhoven from August 2 to August 8, 1999. The Championships were originally scheduled from April 26 to May 9 in Belgrade, Yugoslavia but were postponed after the NATO bombing of Yugoslavia during the Kosovo War in March 1999. Individual events were relocated to Eindhoven and team competitions were moved to Kuala Lumpur in 2000.

== Results ==
Event	Gold	Silver	Bronze
Men's singles	(China) Liu Guoliang	(China) Ma Lin	(Austria) Werner Schlager
Men's singles	(China) Liu Guoliang	(China) Ma Lin	(Sweden) Jan-Ove Waldner
Women's singles	(China) Wang Nan	(China) Zhang Yining	(South Korea) Ryu Ji-hae
Women's singles	(China) Wang Nan	(China) Zhang Yining	(China) Li Nan
Men's doubles	(China) Kong Linghui (China) Liu Guoliang	(China) Wang Liqin (China) Yan Sen	(Croatia) Zoran Primorac (Belarus) Vladimir Samsonov
Men's doubles	(China) Kong Linghui (China) Liu Guoliang	(China) Wang Liqin (China) Yan Sen	(South Korea) Kim Taek-soo (South Korea) Park Sang-joon
Women's doubles	(China) Li Ju (China) Wang Nan	(China) Sun Jin (China) Yang Ying	(China) Zhang Yingying (China) Zhang Yining
Women's doubles	(China) Li Ju (China) Wang Nan	(China) Sun Jin (China) Yang Ying	(South Korea) Kim Moo-kyo (South Korea) Park Hae-jung
Mixed doubles	(China) Ma Lin (China) Zhang Yingying	(China) Feng Zhe (China) Sun Jin	(China) Wang Liqin (China) Wang Nan
Mixed doubles	(China) Ma Lin (China) Zhang Yingying	(China) Feng Zhe (China) Sun Jin	(China) Qin Zhijian (China) Yang Ying
