= TSG Dülmen =

German sports club

- Full name: Turn- und Spielgemeinde e.V. Dülmen
- Founded: 1945
- Based in: Dülmen
- Chairman: Gerhard Wagner
- Website: TSG Dülmen

Turn- und Spielgemeinde e.V. Dülmen is a sports club from the town of Dülmen in Westphalia. The club was founded on 28 October 1945 as the legal successor to the VfL Dülmen and Turn- und Spielverein 1884 Dülmen clubs. It offers football, athletics, table tennis and martial arts.

== Table tennis ==
=== Overview and successes ===
TSG Dülmen's most successful department to date has been the table tennis department. The first women's team was one of the most successful German teams in the 1990s and played in the German table tennis league for many years. In 1987, the team was promoted to the 2nd Bundesliga and in 1988, under coach Dirk Schimmelpfennig, the team made it through to the 1st BL. TSG Dülmen were German champions in 1995 and finished runners-up six times in total. In 1991, the Dülmen team won the ETTU Cup and reached the final the following year; in 1995 and 1996, they reached the European Cup final, but lost both finals against Statisztika Budapest from Hungary. The players in these successful years included Olga Nemes, Ding Yaping, Tong Ling, Nicole Struse, Ilka Böhning, Elke Wosik, Dana Weber and Christiane Praedel. Birgit Schmude (now Birgit Schneider), the German schoolgirl champion from 1986, has been active in the club since 1980. She moved to Langweid in 1991 and returned via ESV Coesfeld in 1994. In 1997, the team made up of Nicole Struse, Åsa Svensson, Alessia Arisi, Ilka Böhning and Birgit Schneider (Schmude) became German runners-up. Immediately afterwards, TSG withdrew all the women's teams.

The men's team became champions of the Oberliga in 1996 and played in the Regionalliga West in 1996/97. Christian Süß was a youth player at TSG in 1998/99. At the end of the 1999/2000 season, the team was withdrawn from the 2nd Bundesliga.

=== The history ===
The table tennis department was founded in 1948 by Hermann Schlüter. Karl Kerckhoff was head of the department for 30 years. Initially, there was only one men's team. A women's team was registered for the first time in 1960. In 1982, the ladies played in the district league. After that, they were promoted every year until they finally reached the 1st Bundesliga in 1988. The manager during this time was Manny Malta, who was replaced by Siegfried Schmitz in 1990.

=== Literature ===
- Dülmen-Report, DTS magazine, 1991/5 p. 28-31
- DTS magazine, 1997/7 p. 6–8; 20

== Athletics ==
In the 1960s, discus thrower Bernd Mensmann was active for TSG Dülmen. Among other things, he was German runner-up in the discus throw in 1960. The department also produced other top athletes. These include sprinter Manuel Sanders and cross-country runner Klara Koppe.

The athletics department of TSG Dülmen organised the German Marathon Championships in 1975 and 1983. Every year on the first weekend of December, a so-called "Nikolauslauf" takes place in favour of the Münster Children's Cancer Aid. This is a road race over 2.5 km, 5 km and 10 km. There are around 600 participants each year. The 38th edition will take place in 2024. Another road race is the "Wasserlauf", which has been held annually since 2014. It was initially held in Hausdülmen. Since 2022, however, it has been held on the same course as the Nikolauslauf in the stadium on Grenzweg.

In addition to the road races, TSG Dülmen has also organised the annual Dülmen pole vault meeting since 2020, in which athletes such as Wolfgang Ritte and Annika Roloff have taken part on several occasions. In 2024, the track opening sports festival will also be held for the 41st time and the school sports festival for the 27th time.
