= 2000 World Team Table Tennis Championships =

2000 edition of the World Team Table Tennis Championships

- Location: Kuala Lumpur, Malaysia
- Dates: 19–26 February

Champions
- Men: Sweden
- Women: China

The 2000 World Team Table Tennis Championships were held in Kuala Lumpur from February 19 to February 26, 2000. The Team Championships were originally part of the 1999 World Championships program scheduled to be held in Belgrade, Yugoslavia but were postponed after the NATO bombing of Yugoslavia during the Kosovo War in March 1999.

== Results ==
=== Team ===
| Event | Gold | Silver | Bronze |
|---|---|---|---|
| Swaythling Cup; Men's Team | Sweden; Fredrik Håkansson; Peter Karlsson; Jörgen Persson; Jan-Ove Waldner | China; Kong Linghui; Liu Guoliang; Liu Guozheng; Ma Lin; Wang Liqin | Italy; Umberto Giardina; Massimiliano Mondello; Valentino Piacentini; Yang Min |
| Swaythling Cup; Men's Team | Sweden; Fredrik Håkansson; Peter Karlsson; Jörgen Persson; Jan-Ove Waldner | China; Kong Linghui; Liu Guoliang; Liu Guozheng; Ma Lin; Wang Liqin | Japan; Seiko Iseki; Kōji Matsushita; Hiroshi Shibutani; Toshio Tasaki; Ryo Yuzawa |
| Corbillon Cup; Women's Team | China; Li Ju; Sun Jin; Wang Hui; Wang Nan; Zhang Yining | Chinese Taipei; Chen Jing; Lu Yun-feng; Pan Li-chun; Tsui Hsiu-li; Xu Jing | South Korea; Kim Moo-Kyo; Lee Eun-Sil; Park Hae-Jung; Ryu Ji-Hae; Seok Eun-Mi |
| Corbillon Cup; Women's Team | China; Li Ju; Sun Jin; Wang Hui; Wang Nan; Zhang Yining | Chinese Taipei; Chen Jing; Lu Yun-feng; Pan Li-chun; Tsui Hsiu-li; Xu Jing | Romania; Otilia Badescu; Ana Gogorita; Antonela Manac; Mihaela Steff |
