= 1995 World Table Tennis Championships – Men's team =

1995 Swaythling Cup (men's team)

The 1995 World Table Tennis Championships – Swaythling Cup (men's team) was the 43rd edition of the men's team championship.

China won the gold medal defeating Sweden 3–2 in the final. South Korea won the bronze medal defeating France in the bronze medal play off.

== Medalists ==
Event	Gold	Silver	Bronze
	China; Ding Song; Kong Linghui; Liu Guoliang; Ma Wenge; Wang Tao	Sweden; Mikael Appelgren; Peter Karlsson; Erik Lindh; Jörgen Persson; Jan-Ove Waldner	South Korea; Chu Kyo-sung; Kim Bong-chul; Kim Taek-soo; Lee Chul-seung; Yoo Nam-kyu

== Final stage knockout phase ==
=== Quarter finals ===
Team One	Team Two	Score
Sweden	Germany	3–2
China	Japan	3–0
France	Yugoslavia	3–1
South Korea	Belgium	3–2

=== Semifinals ===
Team One	Team Two	Score
Sweden	France	3-1
China	South Korea	3-2

=== Third-place play off ===
Team One	Team Two	Score
South Korea	France	3–2

=== Final ===
China 3		Sweden 2	Score
Ma Wenge	bt	Persson	22–24 21–18 21–18
Wang Tao	lost to	Waldner	16–21 19–21
Ding Song	bt	Karlsson	21–14 21–11
Ma Wenge	lost to	Waldner	21–13 12–21 17–21
Wang Tao	bt	Persson	21–14 21–13

== See also ==
List of World Table Tennis Championships medalists
