= Nicolas Chatelain =

French table tennis player

Personal information
- Nationality: French
- Born: 13 January 1970 (age 56) Amiens, France

Sport
- Sport: Table tennis
Medal record
Men's table tennis
Representing France
World Championships
Silver medal – second place	1997 Manchester	Men's team
European Championships
Gold medal – first place	1994 Birmingham	Men's team
Gold medal – first place	1998 Eindhoven	Men's team
Silver medal – second place	1996 Bratislava	Men's team

Nicolas Chatelain (born 13 January 1970) is a male former international table tennis player from France.

He won a silver medal at the 1997 World Table Tennis Championships in the Swaythling Cup (men's team event) with Patrick Chila, Damien Eloi, Jean-Philippe Gatien and Christophe Legout for France.

He also won three European Table Tennis Championships medals in 1994, 1996 and 1998 and competed in the 1992 Summer Olympics.

== See also ==
- List of table tennis players
- List of World Table Tennis Championships medalists
