= 2001 World Table Tennis Championships – Men's singles =

2001 Men's singles

The 2001 World Table Tennis Championships men's singles was the 46th edition of the men's singles championship.

Wang Liqin defeated Kong Linghui in the final, winning three sets to two to secure the title.

== Results ==
Round of 16
(China) Wang Liqin	20	21	21	21
(Sweden) Jörgen Persson	22	17	16	16
(South Korea) Kim Taek-soo	21	21	21
(Croatia) Zoran Primorac	16	17	16
(China) Liu Guoliang	21	21	21
(Romania) Adrian Crișan	12	10	11
(Chinese Taipei) Chiang Peng-lung	21	21	21
(Germany) Timo Boll	18	16	18
(China) Ma Lin	21	21	21	21
(Germany) Jörg Roßkopf	14	10	23	18
(Austria) Werner Schlager	20	22	17	10
(China) Liu Guozheng	22	20	21	21
(Belarus) Vladimir Samsonov	21	21	21
(Sweden) Jan-Ove Waldner	8	14	18
(France) Patrick Chila	14	9	12
(China) Kong Linghui	21	21	21

Quarterfinals
(China) Wang Liqin	15	21	21	21
(South Korea) Kim Taek-soo	21	14	16	13
(China) Liu Guoliang	21	17	6	19
(Chinese Taipei) Peng-lung	12	21	21	21
(China) Ma Lin	21	21	10	14	21
(China) Liu Guozheng	19	13	21	21	19
(Belarus) Samsonov	15	10	21	20
(China) Kong Linghui	21	21	11	22

Semifinals
(China) Wang Liqin	21	24	21
(Chinese Taipei) Peng-lung	13	22	14
(China) Ma Lin	21	17	13	15
(China) Kong Linghui	14	21	21	21

Final
(China) Wang Liqin	11	11	21	21	21
(China) Kong Linghui	21	21	16	13	13

== See also ==
List of World Table Tennis Championships medalists
