= Zhang Yingying =

Zhang Yingying is the name of:

- Zhang Yingying (table tennis) (born 1983), Chinese table tennis player
- Zhang Yingying (runner) (born 1990), Chinese long-distance runner
- Yingying Zhang (victim) (1990–2017), Chinese visiting scholar who disappeared in Illinois, USA
