= Jie Schöpp =

German table tennis player

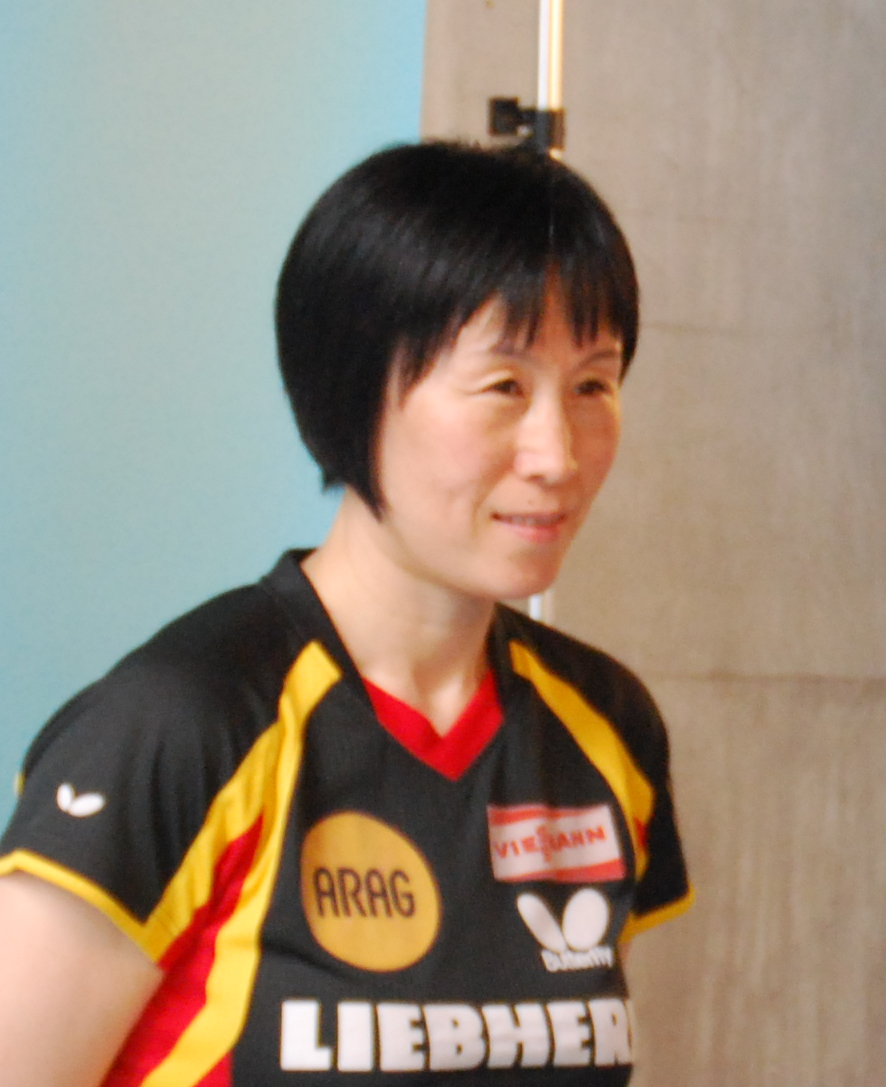
- Jie Schöpp in 2012

Personal information
- Nationality: China; Germany
- Born: 25 January 1968 (age 58) Baoding, China
Medal record
Representing Germany
World Table Tennis Championships
Bronze medal – third place	1997	women's team

Jie Schöpp (née Shi; Chinese: 施婕; pinyin: Shī Jié; born 25 January 1968) is a Chinese-born, German international table tennis player.

== Table tennis career ==
She won a bronze medal for Germany at the 1997 World Table Tennis Championships in the Corbillon Cup (women's team event) with Christina Fischer, Elke Schall, Olga Nemeș and Nicole Struse.

She represented Germany at the 1996, 2000, and 2004 Summer Olympics.
