= 1995 World Table Tennis Championships – Men's singles =

1995 Men's singles

The 1995 World Table Tennis Championships men's singles were the 43rd edition of the men's singles championship.

Kong Linghui defeated Liu Guoliang in the final, winning three sets to two to secure the title.

== Results ==
Round of 16
(China) Ding Song	21	18	17	25	21
(Sweden) Jörgen Persson	13	21	21	23	18
(China) Ma Wenge	18	15	16
(Poland) Lucjan Błaszczyk	21	21	21
(Sweden) Peter Karlsson	21	21	21
(Germany) Peter Franz	17	19	16
(China) Kong Linghui	21	18	21	17	21
(France) Jean-Philippe Gatien	18	21	10	21	8
(Sweden) Jan-Ove Waldner	17	20	21	21	19
(China) Liu Guoliang	21	22	16	17	21
(Belarus) Vladimir Samsonov	22	15	15	21	21
(Germany) Jörg Roßkopf	20	21	21	13	16
(South Korea) Kim Taek-soo	21	19	16	21	21
(China) Wang Yonggang	16	21	21	18	9
(Austria) Ding Yi	6	11	17
(China) Wang Tao	21	21	21

Quarterfinals
(China) Ding Song	21	21	21
(Poland) Błaszczyk	13	10	16
(Sweden) Karlsson	18	25	11	11
(China) Kong Linghui	21	23	21	21
(China) Liu Guoliang	21	21	21
(Belarus) Samsonov	18	18	18
(South Korea) Kim Taek-soo	18	16	18
(China) Wang Tao	21	21	21

Semifinals
(China) Ding Song	12	18	18
(China) Kong Linghui	21	25	21
(China) Liu Guoliang	17	21	21	21
(China) Wang Tao	21	15	18	16

Final
(China) Kong Linghui	17	21	15	21	21
(China) Liu Guoliang	21	16	21	14	10

== See also ==
- List of World Table Tennis Championships medalists
