= Christina Fischer =

German table tennis player

Personal information
- Nationality: Germany
Medal record
Representing Germany
World Table Tennis Championships
Bronze medal – third place	1997	women's team

Christina Fischer is a female former international table tennis player from Germany.

== Table tennis career ==
She won a bronze medal for Germany at the 1997 World Table Tennis Championships in the Corbillon Cup (women's team event) with Olga Nemeș, Elke Schall, Jie Schöpp and Nicole Struse.

She also won three European Table Tennis Championships medals including two golds.

== See also ==
- List of World Table Tennis Championships medalists
