= Kim Jin-myong =

North Korean table tennis player and coach (born 1972)

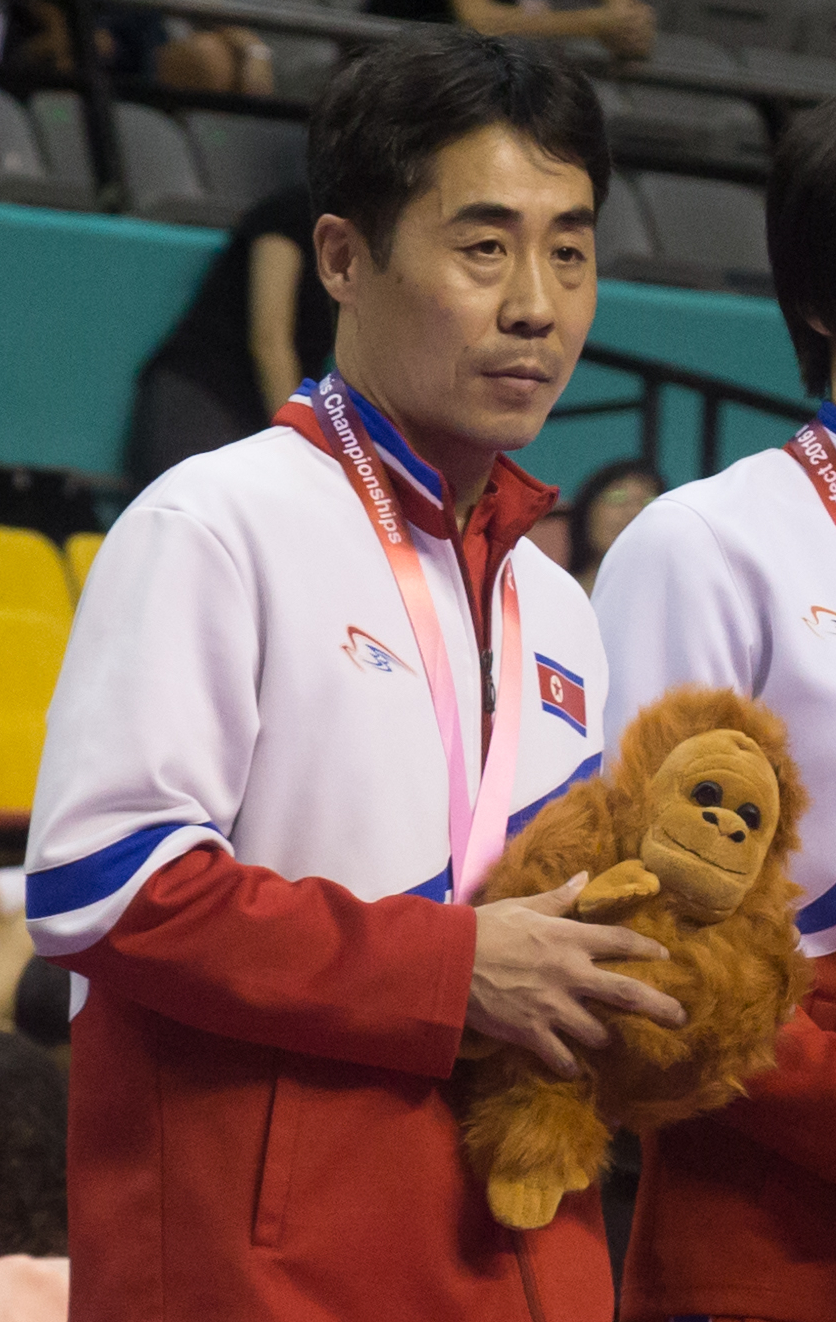
- Kim at the 2016 World Team Table Tennis Championships

Personal information
- Born: 5 November 1972 (age 53) North Korea

Sport
- Sport: Table tennis

- Kim Jin-myong
- Hangul: 김진명
- RR: Gim Jinmyeong
- MR: Kim Chinmyŏng

Kim Jin-myong (Korean: 김진명, born 5 November 1972) is a North Korean table tennis coach and former player. He competed in men's doubles at the 1992 Summer Olympics with Kim Song-hui.

He has been coaching the North Korean women's national team since around 2012.
