= Kinjiro Nakamura =

Japanese table tennis player

Personal information
- Nationality: Japanese
- Born: 2 May 1975 (age 50)

Sport
- Sport: Table tennis

Kinjiro Nakamura (仲村 錦治郎, Nakamura Kinjirō; born 2 May 1975) is a Japanese table tennis player. He competed in the men's doubles event at the 1992 Summer Olympics.
