= Farid Oulami =

Algerian table tennis player

Personal information
- Nationality: Algerian
- Born: 7 August 1974 (age 50)

Sport
- Sport: Table tennis

Farid Oulami (born 7 August 1974) is an Algerian table tennis player. He competed in the men's doubles event at the 2000 Summer Olympics.
