= Olga Nemeș =

German table tennis player

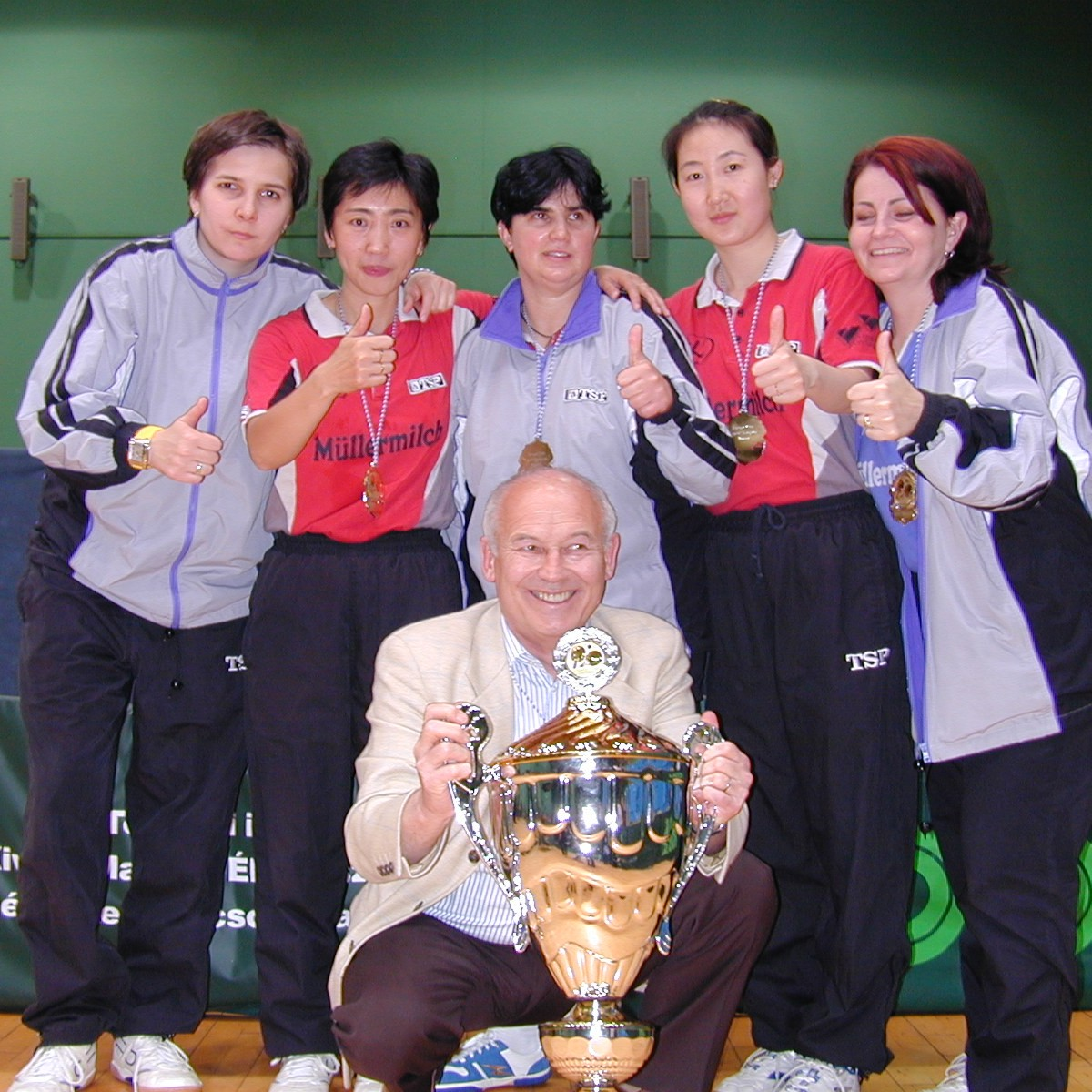
- Langweid table tennis team after winning European Cup on 20 May 2005 in Budapest. Left to right: Andrea Bakula, Yunli Schreiner, Csilla Batorfi, Lin Xu and Olga Nemes.

Personal information
- Nationality: Romania; Germany
- Born: 9 June 1968 (age 58) Târgu Mureș, Romania
Medal record
Representing Germany
World Table Tennis Championships
Bronze medal – third place	1997	women's team

Olga Nemeș (born 9 June 1968) is a former international table tennis player from Germany.

== Table tennis career ==
She won a bronze medal for Germany at the 1997 World Table Tennis Championships in the Corbillon Cup (women's team event) with Christina Fischer, Elke Schall, Jie Schöpp and Nicole Struse.

She represented West Germany and Germany during the 1988, 1992 and 1996 Olympic Games.

== See also ==
- List of World Table Tennis Championships medalists
