= Jeff Plumb =

Australian table tennis player

Personal information
- Nationality: Australian
- Born: 6 October 1974 (age 51) Canberra, Australia

Sport
- Sport: Table tennis

Jeff Plumb (born 6 October 1974) is an Australian table tennis player. He competed in the men's doubles event at the 2000 Summer Olympics.
