= Erich Amplatz =

Austrian table tennis player (born 1960)

Personal information
- Nationality: Austrian
- Born: 6 February 1960 (age 65); Judenburg, Austria

Sport
- Sport: Table tennis

Erich Amplatz (born 6 February 1960) is an Austrian former table tennis player. He competed in the men's doubles event at the 1992 Summer Olympics.
