= 2007 World Table Tennis Championships =

- Date: May 21 - May 27
- Edition: 49th
- Location: Zagreb, Croatia
- Venue: Dom Sportova

Champions

Men's singles
- (China) Wang Liqin

Women's singles
- (China) Guo Yue

Men's doubles
- (China) Chen Qi / (China) Ma Lin

Women's doubles
- (China) Wang Nan / (China) Zhang Yining

Mixed doubles
- (China) Wang Liqin / (China) Guo Yue
- World Table Tennis Championships

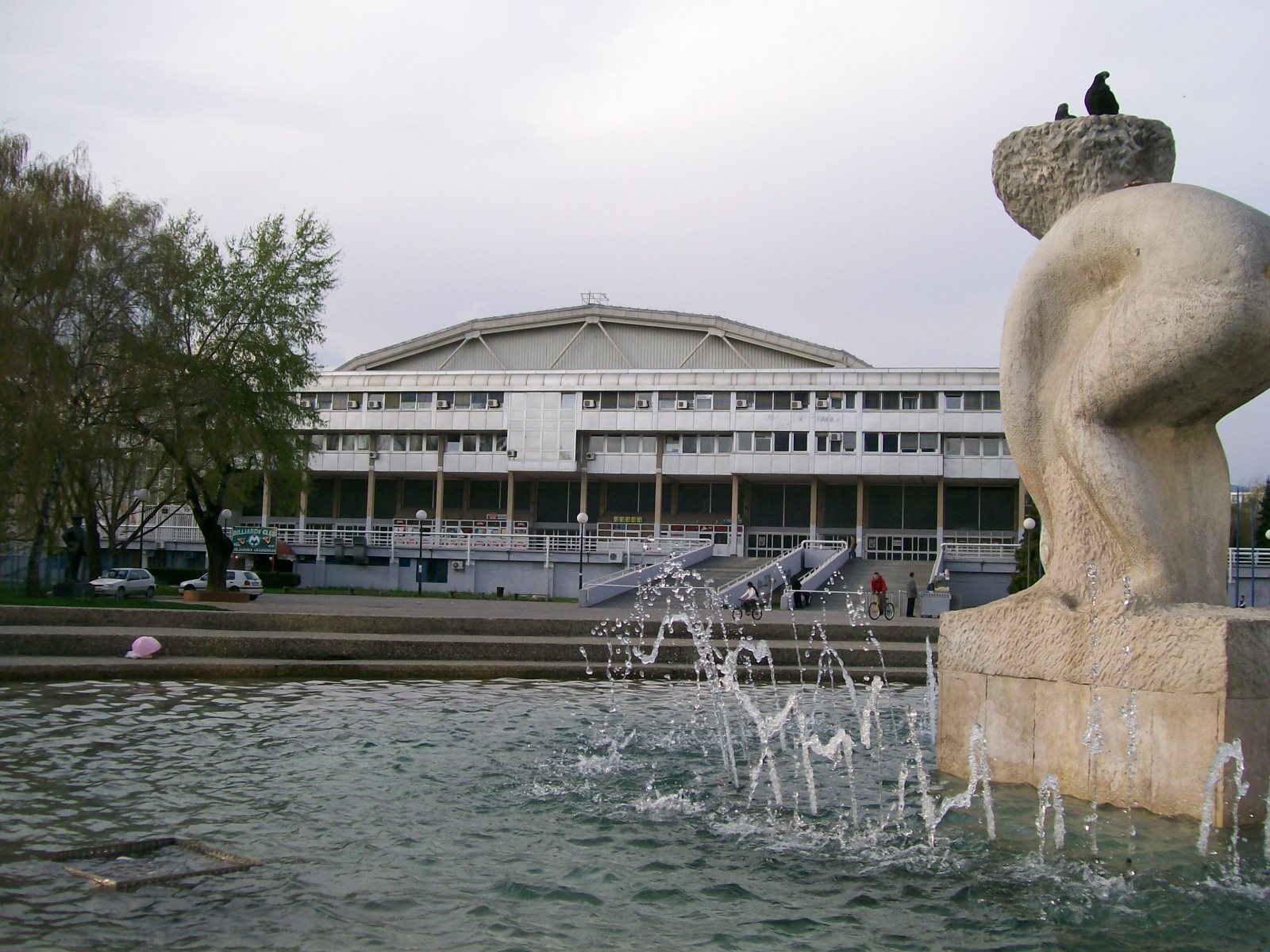
Dom sportova (Zagreb)

The 2007 World Table Tennis Championships was a table tennis tournament that took place in Zagreb, Croatia from May 21 through to May 27, 2007. China won a clean sweep of all the gold and silver medals.

== Medal summary ==
=== Medal table ===
Rank	Nation	Gold	Silver	Bronze	Total
1	China	5	5	4	14
2	Hong Kong	0	0	2	2
2	South Korea	0	0	2	2
4	Chinese Taipei	0	0	1	1
4	Singapore	0	0	1	1
Totals (5 entries)		5	5	10	20

=== Events ===
Event	Gold	Silver	Bronze
Men's singles	(China) Wang Liqin	(China) Ma Lin	(South Korea) Ryu Seung-min
Men's singles	(China) Wang Liqin	(China) Ma Lin	(China) Wang Hao
Women's singles	(China) Guo Yue	(China) Li Xiaoxia	(China) Zhang Yining
Women's singles	(China) Guo Yue	(China) Li Xiaoxia	(China) Guo Yan
Men's doubles	(China) Chen Qi; Ma Lin	(China) Wang Hao; Wang Liqin	(Hong Kong) Ko Lai Chak; Li Ching
Men's doubles	(China) Chen Qi; Ma Lin	(China) Wang Hao; Wang Liqin	(Chinese Taipei) Chang Yen-shu; Chiang Peng-lung
Women's doubles	(China) Wang Nan; Zhang Yining	(China) Guo Yue; Li Xiaoxia	(Singapore) Li Jiawei; Wang Yuegu
Women's doubles	(China) Wang Nan; Zhang Yining	(China) Guo Yue; Li Xiaoxia	(South Korea) Kim Kyung-ah; Park Mi-young
Mixed doubles	(China) Wang Liqin; Guo Yue	(China) Ma Lin; Wang Nan	(China) Qiu Yike; Cao Zhen
Mixed doubles	(China) Wang Liqin; Guo Yue	(China) Ma Lin; Wang Nan	(Hong Kong) Ko Lai Chak; Tie Ya Na

== Finals ==
=== Men's singles ===
(China) Wang Liqin def. (China) Ma Lin, 4–3: 4–11, 8–11, 11–5, 4–11, 11–9, 11–8, 11–6

=== Women's singles ===
(China) Guo Yue def. (China) Li Xiaoxia, 4–3: 8–11, 11–7, 4–11, 2–11, 11–5, 11–2, 11–8

=== Men's doubles ===
(China) Chen Qi / Ma Lin def. (China) Wang Hao / Wang Liqin, 4–2: 6–11, 11–7, 6–11, 11–3, 11–9, 11–9

=== Women's doubles ===
(China) Wang Nan / Zhang Yining def. (China) Guo Yue / Li Xiaoxia, 4–0: 11–5, 11–6, 13–11, 11–9

=== Mixed doubles ===
(China) Wang Liqin / Guo Yue def. (China) Ma Lin / Wang Nan, 4–2: 13–11, 11–7, 8–11, 11–9, 9–11, 12–10
