= Giuliano Peixoto =

Brazilian table tennis player

Personal information
- Nationality: Brazilian
- Born: 29 September 1975 (age 49); Americana, Brazil

Sport
- Sport: Table tennis

Giuliano Peixoto (born 29 September 1975) is a Brazilian table tennis player. He competed in the men's doubles event at the 1996 Summer Olympics.
