= David Kaci =

Algerian table tennis player

Personal information
- Nationality: Algerian
- Born: 25 August 1974 (age 51)

Sport
- Sport: Table tennis

David Kaci (born 25 August 1974) is an Algerian table tennis player. He competed in the men's doubles event at the 2000 Summer Olympics.
