= Ryo Yuzawa =

Japanese table tennis player and coach

Personal information
- Nationality: Japan
- Born: 7 October 1976 (age 50) Tachikawa, Tokyo
Medal record
Representing Japan
World Table Tennis Championships
Bronze medal – third place	2000	Men's Team

Ryo Yuzawa (遊澤 亮, Yuzawa Ryō) is a former international table tennis player and coach from Japan.

He won a bronze medal at the 2000 World Team Table Tennis Championships in the Swaythling Cup (men's team event) with Seiko Iseki, Kōji Matsushita, Hiroshi Shibutani and Toshio Tasaki for Japan.

He competed in two Olympic Games in 1996 and 2004.

== See also ==
- List of table tennis players
- List of World Table Tennis Championships medalists
