= Damir Atiković =

Croatian table tennis player (born 1971)

Personal information
- Nationality: Croatian
- Born: 17 February 1971 (age 54); Zagreb, Yugoslavia

Sport
- Sport: Table tennis

Damir Atiković (born 17 February 1971) is a Croatian table tennis player. He competed in the men's doubles event at the 1996 Summer Olympics.
