= Kim Bong-chul =

South Korean table tennis player (1975–2017)

Personal information
- Nationality: South Korea
- Born: 1975
- Died: 23 January 2017 (aged 41–42) Busan
- Education: Kwangsung Technical High School

Sport
- Sport: Table tennis
Medal record
Representing South Korea
World Table Tennis Championships
Bronze medal – third place	1995	Men's team

Korean name
- Hangul: 김봉철
- RR: Gim Bongcheol
- MR: Kim Pongch'ŏl

Kim Bong-chul (1975 – 23 January 2017) was a male former international table tennis player from South Korea.

He won a bronze medal at the 1995 World Table Tennis Championships in the Swaythling Cup (men's team event) with Chu Kyo-sung, Kim Taek-soo, Lee Chul-seung and Yoo Nam-kyu for South Korea.

== See also ==
- List of table tennis players
- List of World Table Tennis Championships medalists
