= Massimiliano Mondello =

Italian table tennis player (born 1975)

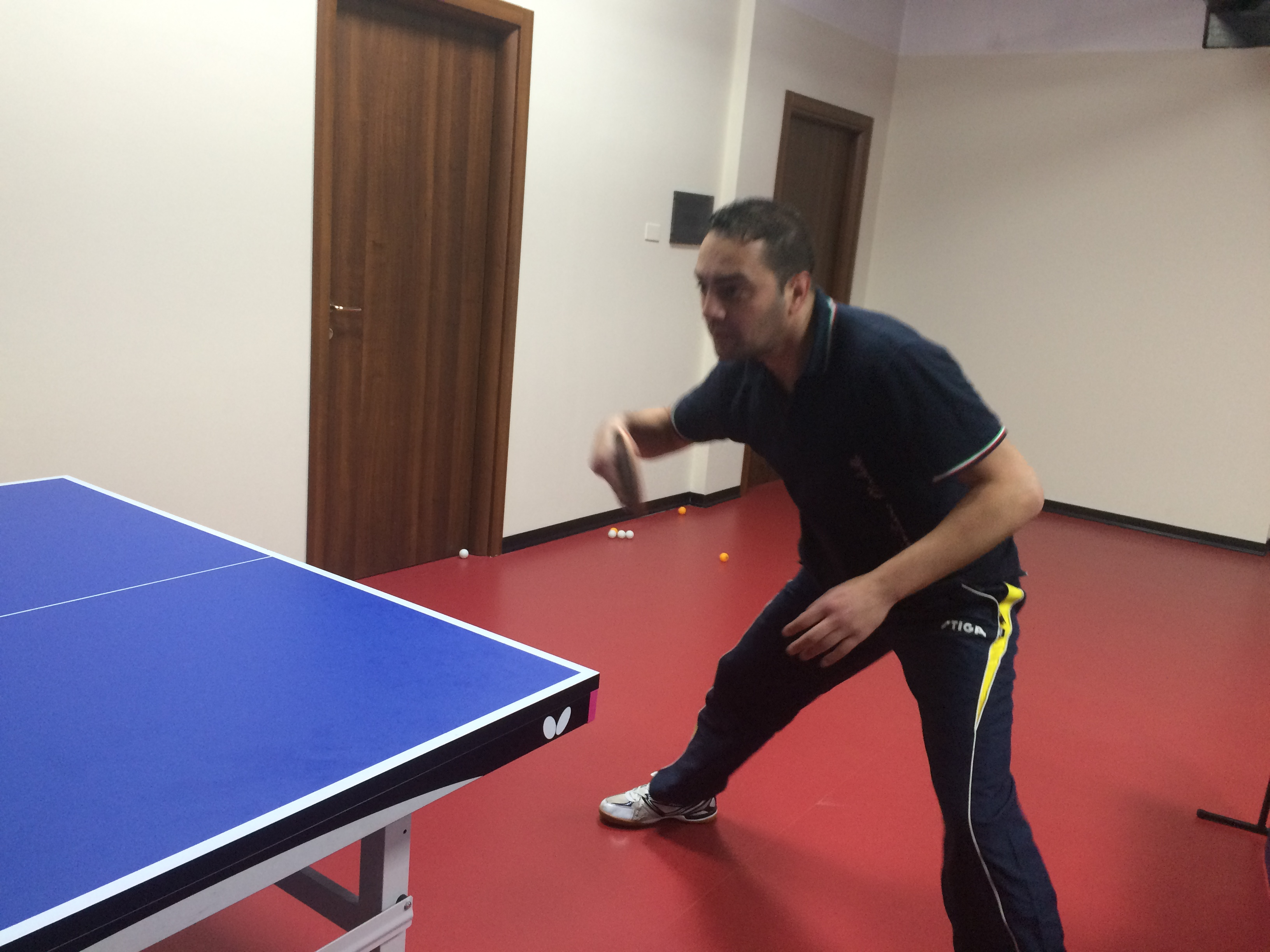

Personal information
- Nationality: Italy
- Born: 31 January 1975 (age 51) Vibo Valentia
Medal record
Representing Italy
World Table Tennis Championships
Bronze medal – third place	2000	Men's Team

Massimiliano Mondello is a male former international table tennis player from Italy.

He won a bronze medal at the 2000 World Team Table Tennis Championships in the Swaythling Cup (men's team event) with Valentino Piacentini, Umberto Giardina and Yang Min for Italy.

He competed in the 2004 Summer Olympics.

He was a ten times Italian champion from 1993 to 1996, 2000 and 2001 and from 2003 to 2006 and played for Italy over 300 times.

== See also ==
- List of table tennis players
- List of World Table Tennis Championships medalists
