= Feng Zhe (table tennis) =

Chinese table tennis player (born 1975)

Personal information
- Nationality: China Bulgaria
- Born: 28 April 1975 (age 51)
Medal record
Representing China
World Table Tennis Championships
Silver medal – second place	1999	Mixed Doubles

Feng Zhe (born in 1975), is a male former Chinese and Bulgarian international table tennis player. He later became a Bulgarian citizen and represented Bulgaria at table tennis.

He won a silver medal at the 1999 World Table Tennis Championships in the mixed doubles with Sun Jin.

== See also ==
- List of table tennis players
