= Umberto Giardina =

Italian table tennis player

Personal information
- Nationality: Italy
- Born: 4 September 1979 (age 46)
Medal record
Representing Italy
World Table Tennis Championships
Bronze medal – third place	2000	Men's Team

Umberto Giardina is a male former international table tennis player from Italy.

He won a bronze medal at the 2000 World Team Table Tennis Championships in the Swaythling Cup (men's team event) with Massimiliano Mondello, Valentino Piacentini and Yang Min for Italy.

He was the 2008 Italian champion.

== See also ==
- List of table tennis players
- List of World Table Tennis Championships medalists
