= Toshio Tasaki =

Japanese table tennis player

Personal information
- Nationality: Japan
- Born: 1 November 1974 (age 51) Tochigi, Tochigi
Medal record
Representing Japan
World Table Tennis Championships
Bronze medal – third place	2000	Men's Team

Toshio Tasaki is a male former international table tennis player from Japan.

He won a bronze medal at the 2000 World Team Table Tennis Championships in the Swaythling Cup (men's team event) with Seiko Iseki, Kōji Matsushita, Hiroshi Shibutani and Ryo Yuzawa for Japan.

He competed in three Olympic Games in 1996, 2000 and 2004.

He plays a traditional penhold style (utilizing only 1 face of the blade) with short pips and is known for his frequent and strong backhand attacks.

== See also ==
- List of table tennis players
- List of World Table Tennis Championships medalists
