= Park Kyung-ae =

South Korean table tennis player

Park Kyung-Ae
Personal information
- Nationality: South Korea
- Born: August 25, 1971
Medal record
Representing South Korea
World Table Tennis Championships
Silver medal – second place	1995	women's team

Park Kyung-Ae (born 25 August 1971) is a female former international table tennis player from South Korea.

== Table tennis career ==
She won a silver medal for South Korea at the 1995 World Table Tennis Championships in the Corbillon Cup (women's team event) with Kim Moo-kyo, Park Hae-jung and Ryu Ji-hae.

She represented South Korea at the Olympic Games in 1996.

== See also ==
- List of World Table Tennis Championships medalists
