= Valentino Piacentini =

Italian table tennis player

Personal information
- Nationality: Italy
- Born: 30 September 1978 (age 48)
Medal record
Representing Italy
World Table Tennis Championships
Bronze medal – third place	2000	Men's Team

Valentino Piacentini is a male former international table tennis player from Italy.

He won a bronze medal at the 2000 World Team Table Tennis Championships in the Swaythling Cup (men's team event) with Massimiliano Mondello, Umberto Giardina and Yang Min for Italy.

He was three times Italian champion from 1997 until 1999. He was banned for 20 months in 2008 after testing positive for cocaine.

== See also ==
- List of table tennis players
- List of World Table Tennis Championships medalists
