= Damien Éloi =

French table tennis player (born 1969)

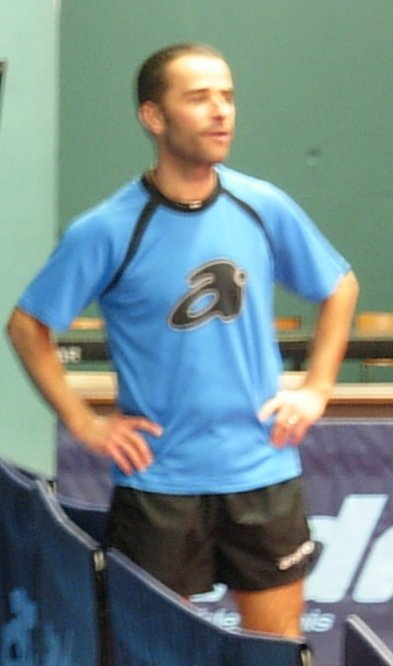
- Damien eloi.

Personal information
- Nationality: French
- Born: 4 July 1969 (age 57) Vire, Calvados, France
- Height: 1.65 m (5 ft 5 in)
- Weight: 58 kg (128 lb)

Sport
- Sport: Table tennis
- Club: Chartres ASTT
- Playing style: Right-handed, attacking
- Equipment: Tibhar 4S
- Highest ranking: 20 (January 2001)
- Current ranking: 88 (February 2013)
Medal record
Men's table tennis
Representing France
Mediterranean Games
Gold medal – first place	2001 Tunis	Singles
World Championships
Silver medal – second place	1997 Manchester	Team
Bronze medal – third place	1995 Tianjin	Doubles
Bronze medal – third place	1997 Manchester	Doubles
ITTF Pro Tour
Gold medal – first place	1998 Sundsvall	Singles
Silver medal – second place	1998 Belgrade	Doubles
Silver medal – second place	1999 Bremen	Doubles
Silver medal – second place	2002 Cairo	Doubles
Silver medal – second place	2004 Wels	Doubles
Silver medal – second place	2006 Jeonju	Singles
Bronze medal – third place	1999 Bremen	Singles

Damien Éloi (born 4 July 1969 in Vire, Calvados) is a French table tennis player. As of February 2013, Eloi is ranked no. 88 in the world by the International Table Tennis Federation (ITTF). He is also right-handed, and uses the attacking grip and Tibhar 4S blade.

== Table tennis career ==
Since he became a member of the national team in 1990, Eloi is considered one of France's top-level table tennis players in its sporting history. He is a multiple-time French champion in both the singles and doubles tournaments, and has won a total of seven medals (one gold, five silver, and one bronze) in the same discipline at the ITTF World Tour series. Playing with four-time Olympian Jean-Philippe Gatien (1988–2000), Eloi had won two bronze medals in the men's doubles at the 1995 and 1997 World Table Tennis Championships, held in Tianjin, China, and in Manchester, England, respectively. Eloi is previously a member of the table tennis team at the Levallois Sporting Club in Paris, before he moved to Chartres to train for Chartres Table Tennis Sports Association (French: Chartres Association Sportive de Tennis de Table).

Eloi made his official debut at the 1992 Summer Olympics in Barcelona, where he competed only in the men's doubles tournament. Eloi and his partner Jean-Philippe Gatien won the preliminary pool round against Poland, Nigeria, and New Zealand, receiving only three victories and a total score of 143 points. The French pair, however, lost the quarterfinal match to the Chinese duo Lü Lin and Wang Tao, with a set score of 1–3. At the 1996 Summer Olympics in Atlanta, Eloi and Gatien repeated their position in the men's doubles tournament, when the French pair lost for the second time to former West German duo and Olympic silver medalists Jörg Roßkopf and Steffen Fetzner in the quarterfinal match, receiving a unanimous set score of 0–3.

At the 2000 Summer Olympics in Sydney, Eloi teamed up with new partner Christophe Legoût in the men's doubles tournament, where the French pair placed first in the preliminary pool round against Canada's Johnny Huang and Kurt Liu, and Argentina's Liu Song and Pablo Tabachnik, receiving four winning matches and a total score of 96 points. Eloi and Legout defeated Sweden's Jörgen Persson and Jan-Ove Waldner in the first round of the knock-out stage, before losing out their next match to the formidable Chinese duo Wang Liqin and Yan Sen, with a unanimous set score of 0–3. Being chosen as one of the top 16 seeded players, Eloi received a bye in the preliminary pool stage of the men's singles, before beating South Korea's Lee Chul-Seung in his first match. He progressed to the second round, but narrowly lost to China's Liu Guoliang, with a final set score of 2–3.

Eight years after competing in his last Olympics, Eloi qualified for his fourth French team, as a 38-year-old, at the 2008 Summer Olympics in Beijing, by receiving an allocated spot from the Final World Qualification Tournament in Budapest, Hungary. He defeated Egypt's Ahmed Saleh in the first round of the men's singles tournament, before narrowly losing out his next match to Japan's Jun Mizutani, with a set score of 3–4.
