= Yang Min =

Italian table tennis player (born 1963)

Personal information
- Nationality: China; Italy
- Born: 20 February 1963 (age 63)
Medal record
Representing Italy
World Table Tennis Championships
Bronze medal – third place	2000	Men's Team

Yang Min (Chinese: 杨敏; pinyin: Yáng Mǐn, born 20 February 1963) is a Chinese-Italian table tennis player who represented Italy at the 2004 Summer Olympics.

He won a bronze medal at the 2000 World Team Table Tennis Championships in the Swaythling Cup (men's team event) with Umberto Giardina, Massimiliano Mondello and Valentino Piacentini for Italy.

== See also ==
- List of table tennis players
- List of World Table Tennis Championships medalists
