= Christophe Legoût =

French table tennis player (born 1973)

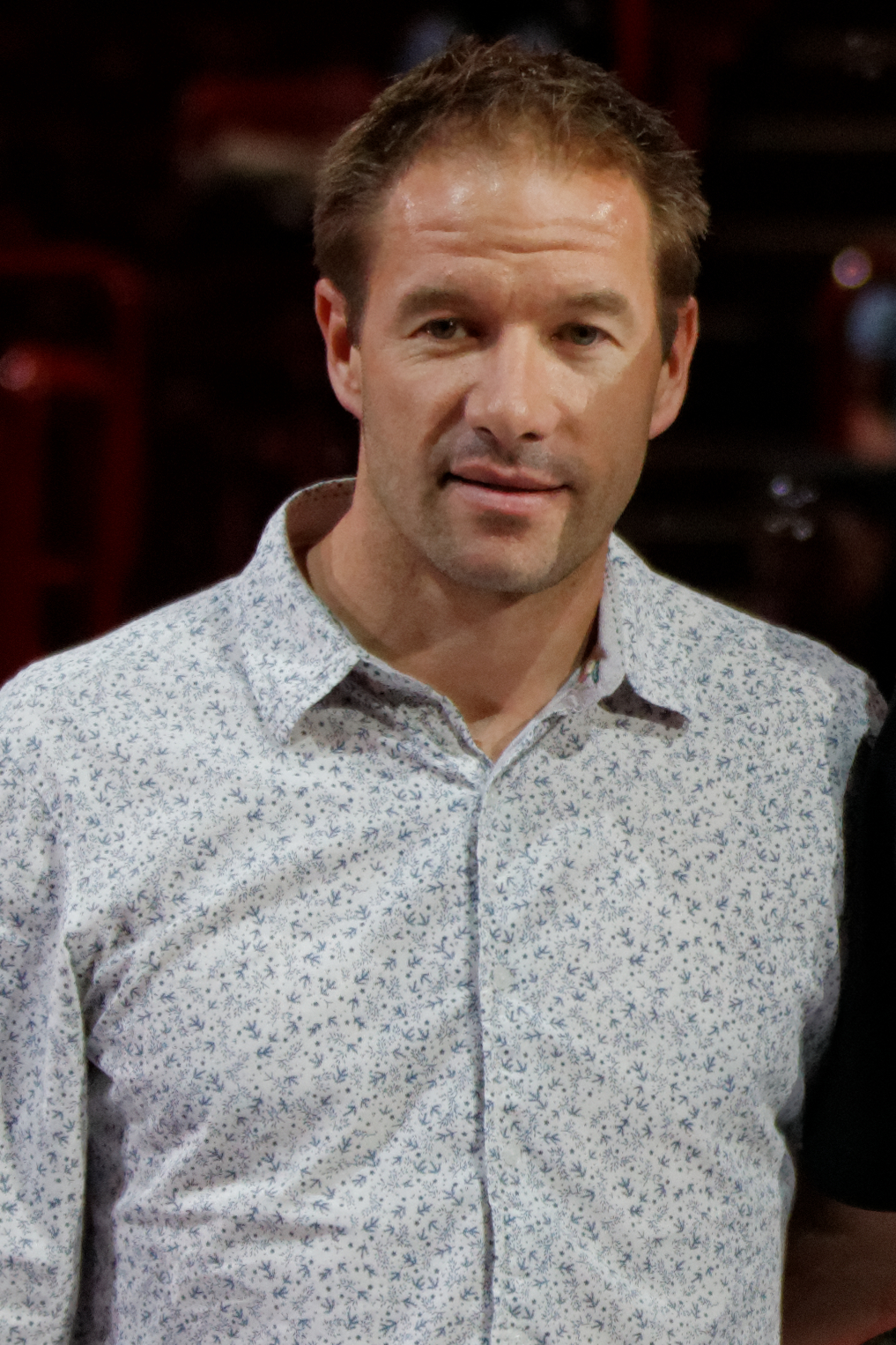
- Christophe Legoût (2013)

Personal information
- Nickname: Superman
- Nationality: France
- Born: 6 August 1973 (age 52) Montbéliard, Doubs, France
- Height: 1.77 m (5 ft 9 1/2 in)

Sport
- Sport: Table tennis
- Playing style: Left-handed, classic
- Equipment: Butterfly Legout
- Highest ranking: 15 (February 2001)
Medal record
Men's table tennis
Representing France
World Championships
Silver medal – second place	1997 Manchester	Team
ITTF Pro Tour
Gold medal – first place	1996 Bolzano	Doubles
Gold medal – first place	1997 Lyon	Singles
Gold medal – first place	1997 Kettering	Doubles
Silver medal – second place	1998 Houston	Singles
Silver medal – second place	1998 Belgrade	Doubles
Silver medal – second place	1999 Bremen	Doubles
Silver medal – second place	2001 Chatham	Singles
Silver medal – second place	2006 Taipei	Singles
Silver medal – second place	2009 Warsaw	Doubles
Silver medal – second place	2013 Almeria	Singles

Christophe Legoût (born 6 August 1973 in Montbéliard, Doubs) is a French table tennis player. He is also left-handed, and uses the classic grip and Butterfly Legout blade.

== Table tennis career ==
Since he became a member of the national team in 1991, Legout is considered one of France's most prominent and popular table tennis players in its sporting history. He is a multiple-time French champion in both the singles and doubles tournaments, and has won a total of ten medals (three golds and seven silver) in the same discipline at the ITTF World Tour series. Legout is previously a member of the table tennis team at the Levallois Sporting Club in Paris, before he moved to Provence to train for Istres Ouest Provence, under his personal coaches Jean Claude and Stéphane Lebrun.

Legout made his official debut at the 1996 Summer Olympics in Atlanta, where he competed only in the men's doubles tournament. Legout and his partner Patrick Chila placed second in the preliminary pool round against China, Sweden, and Ghana, receiving only two victories, four winning matches, and a total score of 133 points.

At the 2000 Summer Olympics in Sydney, Legout teamed up with two-time world bronze medalist Damien Éloi in the men's doubles tournament, where the French pair placed first in the preliminary pool round against Canada's Johnny Huang and Kurt Liu, and Argentina's Liu Song and Pablo Tabachnik, receiving four winning matches and a total score of 96 points. Legout and Eloi defeated Sweden's Jörgen Persson and Jan-Ove Waldner in the first round of the knock-out stage, before losing out their next match to the formidable Chinese duo Wang Liqin and Yan Sen, with a unanimous set score of 0–3. Having been chosen as one of the top 16 seeded players, Legout received a bye in the preliminary pool stage of the men's singles, before beating South Korea's Ryu Seung-min in his first match. He progressed to the second round, but lost to Belarus' Vladimir Samsonov, with a final set score of 0–3.

Eight years after competing in his last Olympics, Legout qualified for his third French team, as a 35-year-old, at the 2008 Summer Olympics in Beijing, by receiving a place as one of the top 8 seeded players from the European Qualification Tournament in Nantes. He received a bye for the first round match of his only event, the men's singles, before losing out to Vietnam's Doan Kien Quoc, with a set score of 2–4.
