= Chu Kyo-sung =

South Korean table tennis player

Personal information
- Nationality: South Korea
- Born: 21 May 1971 (age 55)

Korean name
- Hangul: 추교성
- Hanja: 秋敎成
- RR: Chu Gyoseong
- MR: Ch'u Kyosŏng
Medal record
Representing South Korea
World Table Tennis Championships
Bronze medal – third place	1995	Men's Team
Bronze medal – third place	1997	Men's Team

Chu Kyo-sung is a male former international table tennis player from South Korea.

He attended Donga Technical High School in Busan.

He won a bronze medal at the 1995 World Table Tennis Championships in the Swaythling Cup (men's team event) with Kim Bong-chul, Kim Taek-soo, Lee Chul-seung and Yoo Nam-kyu for South Korea.

Two years later he won another bronze medal at the 1997 World Table Tennis Championships in the Swaythling Cup (men's team event) with Kim Taek-soo, Lee Chul-seung, Oh Sang-eun and Yoo Nam-kyu.

== See also ==
- List of table tennis players
- List of World Table Tennis Championships medalists
