= Zhang Yingying (table tennis) =

Chinese table tennis player

Personal information
- Nationality: China
- Born: January 1983 (age 43)
Medal record
Representing China
World Table Tennis Championships
Gold medal – first place	1999	Mixed Doubles
Bronze medal – third place	1999	Women's Doubles
Bronze medal – third place	2001	Women's Doubles

Zhang Yingying (Chinese: 张莹莹; pinyin: Zhāng Yíngyíng; born 1983) is a female Chinese former international table tennis player.

She won a gold medal and bronze medal at the 1999 World Table Tennis Championships with partners Ma Lin and Zhang Yining, respectively.

== See also ==
- List of table tennis players
