= Fredrik Håkansson =

Swedish table tennis player

Personal information
- Full name: Johan Fredrik Håkansson
- Nationality: Sweden
- Born: 2 August 1975 (age 50) Laholm, Sweden
Medal record
Men's table tennis
Representing Sweden
World Championships
Gold medal – first place	2000 Kuala Lumpur	Team
Bronze medal – third place	2001 Osaka	Team

Johan Fredrik Håkansson (born 2 August 1975) is a Swedish international table tennis player.

He won a gold medal at the 2000 World Team Table Tennis Championships in the men's team and the following year he won a bronze medal at the 2001 World Table Tennis Championships in the men's teams.

He also competed in the 2000 Summer Olympics.

== See also ==
- List of table tennis players
- List of World Table Tennis Championships medalists
