= Todd Sweeris =

American table tennis player

Personal information
- Born: May 28, 1973 (age 53) Grand Rapids, Michigan, United States

Sport
- Sport: Table tennis

Todd Sweeris (born May 28, 1973) is an American table tennis player. He competed at the 1996 Summer Olympics and the 2000 Summer Olympics.
