= Augusto Morales =

Chilean table tennis player

Personal information
- Nationality: Chilean
- Born: 14 June 1967 (age 57)

Sport
- Sport: Table tennis

Augusto Morales (born 14 June 1967) is a Chilean table tennis player. He competed at the 1992 Summer Olympics, the 1996 Summer Olympics, and the 2000 Summer Olympics.
