= Elke Schall =

German table tennis player

Personal information
- Nationality: Germany
- Born: 19 July 1973 (age 52) Speyer, West Germany
Medal record
Representing Germany
World Table Tennis Championships
Bronze medal – third place	1997	women's team

Elke Schall,(born 19 July 1973 in Speyer) is a professional table tennis player from Germany. She has an offensive, looping style.

She competed at five consecutive Olympics from 1992 to 2008. Her doubles partner at the first four Olympics was Nicole Struse, with whom she won the European Championships in 1996 and 1998. She was part of the German team that came third in 1997 and sixth in 2004 at the World Championships and three podium finishes at the European Championships in 2000, 2002, and 2007.

She won the German Mixed Doubles championship six times and was Germany Player of the Year in 2003. At the 2009 World Championships, she and Christian Suss reached the quarter-finals but were then beaten by the eventual silver medalists.

From 2001 to 2008 she was married to fellow Germany professional table tennis player Torben Wosik, whom she met in 1991.

She has three brothers and sisters. Her brother Martin is a retired professional basketball player.

Her home club is TV Busenbach.

== See also ==
- List of athletes with the most appearances at Olympic Games
