= Nicole Struse =

German table tennis player

Personal information
- Full name: STRUSE Nicole
- Nationality: Germany West Germany
- Born: 31 May 1971 (age 55)

Sport
- Sport: Table tennis
Medal record
Women's table tennis
Representing Germany
World Championships
Bronze medal – third place	1997 Manchester	Team
World Cup
Silver medal – second place	1994 Nimes	Team
European Championships
Gold medal – first place	1996 Bratislava	Singles
Gold medal – first place	1996 Bratislava	Doubles
Gold medal – first place	1996 Bratislava	Team
Gold medal – first place	1998 Eindhoven	Doubles
Gold medal – first place	1998 Eindhoven	Team
Silver medal – second place	1994 Birmingham	Team
Silver medal – second place	2000 Bremen	Team
Silver medal – second place	2002 Zagreb	Team
Bronze medal – third place	1994 Birmingham	Singles
Bronze medal – third place	1998 Eindhoven	Singles
Bronze medal – third place	2000 Bremen	Doubles

Nicole Struse (born 31 May 1971 in Haan, North Rhine Westphalia) is a German table tennis player, who won several national contests and reached round three with Elke Wosik in the Women's Doubles Competition at the 2004 Summer Olympics. She represented her native country at four consecutive Summer Olympics, starting in 1992. 1995 she was ranked no 1 in the European ranking list. 2004 she won the Europe Top-12 table tennis tournament. After winning the eight German single championship she replaced Hilde Bussmann and Trude Pritzi as new record holder in 2005. 2006 she and Wu Jiaduo won the German double championship. Struse ist right-hander, her strength is the offence. Recently, in March 2009, she was sixth of the German ranking. After that she was not ranked any more because of having not taken part in enough table tennis games during the last twelve months.

== Associations ==
Nicole Struse belonged to the following associations:

- SSVg Haan (from 1980)
- TTC Fortuna Solingen
- DSC Kaiserberg (1985–1986)
- Weiß-Rot-Weiß Kleve (1986–1987)
- Spvg Steinhagen (1987–1994)
- TSG Dülmen (1994–1997)
- Assistance Coesfeld (1997–1998)
- Montpellier TT (Frankreich) (1999–2000)
- FSV Kroppach (2000–2009)
- SV Böblingen (2009-????)

== Private life ==
On 1 May 2000 Struse became a member of the “Sportfördergruppe” of the "Federal Defence Force" of Germany in Mainz.

== Literature ==
- Rahul Nelson: Energiegeladenes Temperamentbündel auf dem Weg nach oben: Nicole Struse, Magazine DTS, 1990/6 S.36-38
- Manfred Schillings: Auf dem Gipfel des Erfolges, Bericht über die dreifache Europameisterin 1996, Magazine DTS, 1996/6 S.8-9
- Rahul Nelson: Das Leben der Nicole Struse (4 parts series)
  - Teil 1: Allein unter Jungs, Magazine DTS, 1996/7 S.7-9
  - Teil 2: Lehrjahre sind keine Mädchenjahre, Magazine DTS, 1996/9 S.36-38
  - Teil 3: School is out forever, Magazine DTS, 1996/10 S.50-52
  - Teil 4: Auf dem Gipfel Europas, Magazine DTS, 1996/11 S.26-28

== See also ==
- List of table tennis players
