= Hiroshi Shibutani =

Japanese table tennis player

Personal information
- Nationality: Japan
- Born: 6 April 1967 (age 59)
Medal record
Representing Japan
World Table Tennis Championships
Bronze medal – third place	1997	Men's Doubles
Bronze medal – third place	2000	Men's Team

Hiroshi Shibutani (渋谷 浩, Shibutani Hiroshi; born 1967) is a Japanese former international table tennis player.

He won a bronze medal at the 1997 World Table Tennis Championships in the men's doubles with Kōji Matsushita and three years later won another bronze at the 2000 World Team Table Tennis Championships.

His father was Goro Shibutani and they became the first father and son to win the All-Japan Singles title.

== See also ==
- List of table tennis players
