= Wang Liqin =

Chinese table tennis player (born 1978)

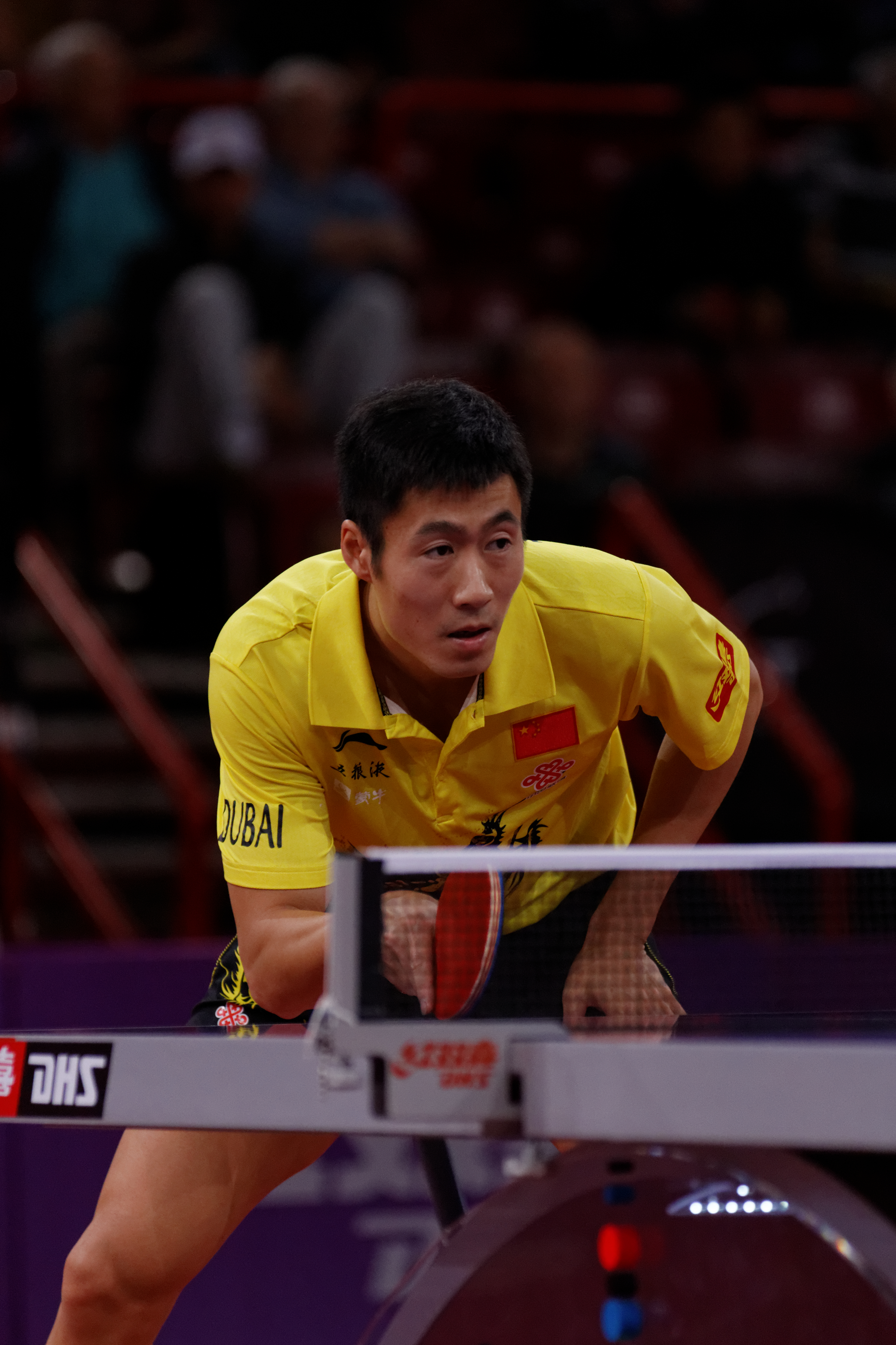
- 2013 World Table Tennis Championships

Personal information
- Native name: 王励勤
- Full name: Wang Liqin
- Nationality: China
- Born: 18 June 1978 (age 48) Shanghai, China
- Height: 1.85 m (6 ft 1 in)
- Weight: 75 kg (165 lb)

Sport
- Sport: Table tennis
- Playing style: Shakehand grip
Medal record
Event	1st	2nd	3rd
Olympic Games	2	0	2
World Championships	11	4	5
World Cup	3	1	4
Total	16	5	11
Men's table tennis
Representing China
Olympic Games
Gold medal – first place	2000 Sydney	Doubles
Gold medal – first place	2008 Beijing	Team
Bronze medal – third place	2004 Athens	Singles
Bronze medal – third place	2008 Beijing	Singles
World Championships
Gold medal – first place	2001 Osaka	Singles
Gold medal – first place	2001 Osaka	Doubles
Gold medal – first place	2001 Osaka	Team
Gold medal – first place	2003 Paris	Doubles
Gold medal – first place	2004 Doha	Team
Gold medal – first place	2005 Shanghai	Singles
Gold medal – first place	2005 Shanghai	Mixed doubles
Gold medal – first place	2006 Bremen	Team
Gold medal – first place	2007 Zagreb	Singles
Gold medal – first place	2007 Zagreb	Mixed doubles
Gold medal – first place	2008 Guangzhou	Team
Silver medal – second place	1999 Eindhoven	Doubles
Silver medal – second place	2000 Kuala Lumpur	Team
Silver medal – second place	2007 Zagreb	Doubles
Silver medal – second place	2009 Yokohama	Singles
Bronze medal – third place	1997 Manchester	Mixed doubles
Bronze medal – third place	1999 Eindhoven	Mixed doubles
Bronze medal – third place	2005 Shanghai	Doubles
Bronze medal – third place	2013 Paris	Doubles
Bronze medal – third place	2013 Paris	Mixed doubles
World Cup
Gold medal – first place	2007 Magdeburg	Team
Gold medal – first place	2011 Magdeburg	Team
Gold medal – first place	2013 Guangzhou	Team
Silver medal – second place	2001 Courmayeur	Singles
Bronze medal – third place	2000 Yangzhou	Singles
Bronze medal – third place	2003 Jiangyin	Singles
Bronze medal – third place	2006 Paris	Singles
Bronze medal – third place	2007 Barcelona	Singles
Asian Games
Gold medal – first place	1998 Bangkok	Mixed doubles
Gold medal – first place	1998 Bangkok	Team
Gold medal – first place	2002 Busan	Singles
Gold medal – first place	2002 Busan	Team
Bronze medal – third place	2002 Busan	Doubles
Bronze medal – third place	2002 Busan	Mixed Doubles

Wang Liqin (simplified Chinese: 王励勤; traditional Chinese: 王勵勤; pinyin: Wáng Lìqín; born June 18, 1978) is a Chinese table tennis player. He began playing at the age of 6 and was picked for the Chinese men's national squad in 1993 when he was only 15 years old. He holds three majors (3 World Championships). He has been ranked #1 by ITTF for 25 consecutive months, from September 2000 to September 2002, which is the second-longest period for being consecutive #1 of the world as of January 2011. At the end of 2013, Wang Liqin retired from the national team.

After years of service in leadership positions at athletic organizations in Shanghai focusing on table tennis and badminton, Wang Liqin has been appointed as the new president of the Chinese Table Tennis Association on April 23, 2025, succeeding Liu Guoliang. Ma Long will serve under him as the new vice-president.

== Playstyle and equipment ==
Wang changes his playing equipment often. He has perhaps used more than 10 different model of rackets, some of them for a longer period of time, e.g. The Butterfly Timo Boll Spirit, Stiga Clipper CR, Offensive CR, Rosewood V, DHS Hurricane King II, III, and some Nittaku's models. His main forehand rubber is DHS Hurricane II, III, TG III. It is said that he had used Nittaku Hammond, the Tenergy series, and many other rubbers for his backhand.

Wang Liqin uses the shakehand grip. He plays a forehand dominated style with the occasional backhand loop to open a topspin rally. His above average height allows him additional leverage for acceleration and momentum, creating more powerful shots. Many often describe him as possessing one of the most unusual and powerful forehand shots.

== Awards ==
Wang won the gold medal in doubles at the 2000 Summer Olympics in Sydney, Australia, and the bronze medal in singles at the 2004 Summer Olympics held in Athens, Greece, as well as at the 2008 Summer Olympics held in Beijing, China. At the 2008 Summer Olympics Wang won gold medal in team competition with Ma Lin and Wang Hao. For most of 2004–6, he ranked as the world's best table tennis player.

Wang Liqin won his first World Championship in Osaka, Japan in 2001. In 2003, Wang made it to the quarter-finals of the World Table Tennis Championships. He has since won two more World Championships – 48th WTTC 2005 in Shanghai, China and 49th WTTC 2007 in Zagreb, Croatia. Wang Liqin is ranked #12 in the world for Men's Singles, based on the ITTF World Ranking page as of January 2014.

== See also ==
- List of table tennis players
- World Table Tennis Championships
- Sport in China

Preceded by Liu Guoliang; Werner Schlager	World Table Tennis Champion; 2001; 2005, 2007	Succeeded by Werner Schlager; Wang Hao
