= Kōji Matsushita =

Japanese table tennis player

Personal information
- Nationality: Japan
- Born: 28 August 1967 (age 58)
- Height: 1.71 m (5 ft 7 in)
- Weight: 65 kg (143 lb)
Medal record
Representing Japan
World Table Tennis Championships
Bronze medal – third place	1997	Men's Doubles
Bronze medal – third place	2000	Men's Team

Kōji Matsushita (松下 浩二, Matsushita Kōji; born 1967) is a male Japanese former international table tennis player.

He won a bronze medal at the 1997 World Table Tennis Championships in the men's doubles with Hiroshi Shibutani and three years later won another bronze at the 2000 World Team Table Tennis Championships.

== See also ==
- List of table tennis players
