= Jean-Philippe Gatien =

French table tennis player (born 1968)

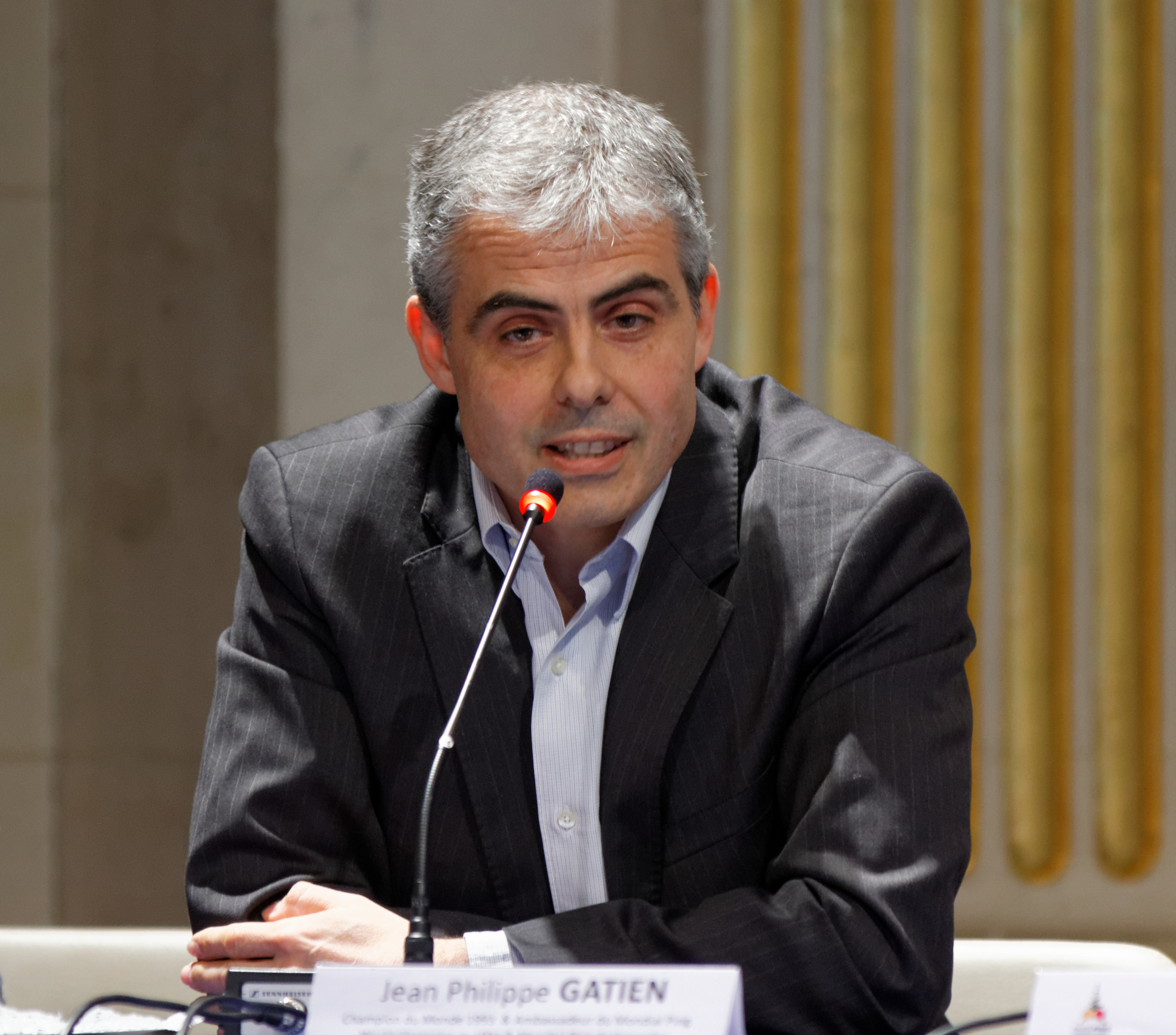
- Mondial Ping 2013

Personal information
- Full name: Jean-Philippe Gatien
- Nationality: France
- Born: 16 October 1968 (age 57) Alès, France

Sport
- Sport: Table tennis
Medal record
Men's table tennis
Representing France
Olympic Games
Silver medal – second place	1992 Barcelona	Singles
Bronze medal – third place	2000 Sydney	Doubles
World Championships
Gold medal – first place	1993 Gothenburg	Singles
Silver medal – second place	1997 Manchester	Team
Bronze medal – third place	1995 Tianjin	Doubles
Bronze medal – third place	1997 Manchester	Doubles
World Cup
Gold medal – first place	1994 Taipei	Singles
Silver medal – second place	1991 Kuala Lumpur	Singles
Bronze medal – third place	1991 Barcelona	Team
Bronze medal – third place	1994 Nimes	Team
European Championships
Gold medal – first place	1990 Gothenburg	Mixed Doubles
Gold medal – first place	1994 Birmingham	Team
Gold medal – first place	1998 Eindhoven	Team
Gold medal – first place	2000 Bremen	Doubles
Silver medal – second place	1986 Prague	Team
Silver medal – second place	1992 Stuttgart	Mixed Doubles
Silver medal – second place	1996 Bratislava	Team
Bronze medal – third place	1990 Gothenburg	Singles
Bronze medal – third place	1996 Bratislava	Singles
Bronze medal – third place	1998 Eindhoven	Singles

Jean-Philippe Gatien (French pronunciation: [ʒɑ̃ filip ɡasjɛ̃], born 16 October 1968, in Alès, France, is a retired French table tennis player.

He competed in four Olympics Games from 1988 to 2000, winning silver in the singles at the 1992 Barcelona Olympics and bronze in doubles (with Patrick Chila) at the 2000 Sydney Olympics. He won the World Table Tennis Championships in 1993, the Table Tennis World Cup in 1994, and was 13-time "champion de France". A left-handed player, his offensive style featured a superb forehand smash.

He has also won three English Open titles.

Following numerous injuries, Gatien retired on 15 May 2004. Having made his debut with French club AS Salindres, he made his final public appearance there in an exhibition match with Patrick Chila, June 2006. His long list of victories make him the greatest French table tennis player of all time.

== See also ==
- List of table tennis players
- List of World Table Tennis Championships medalists
