= Patrick Chila =

French table tennis player

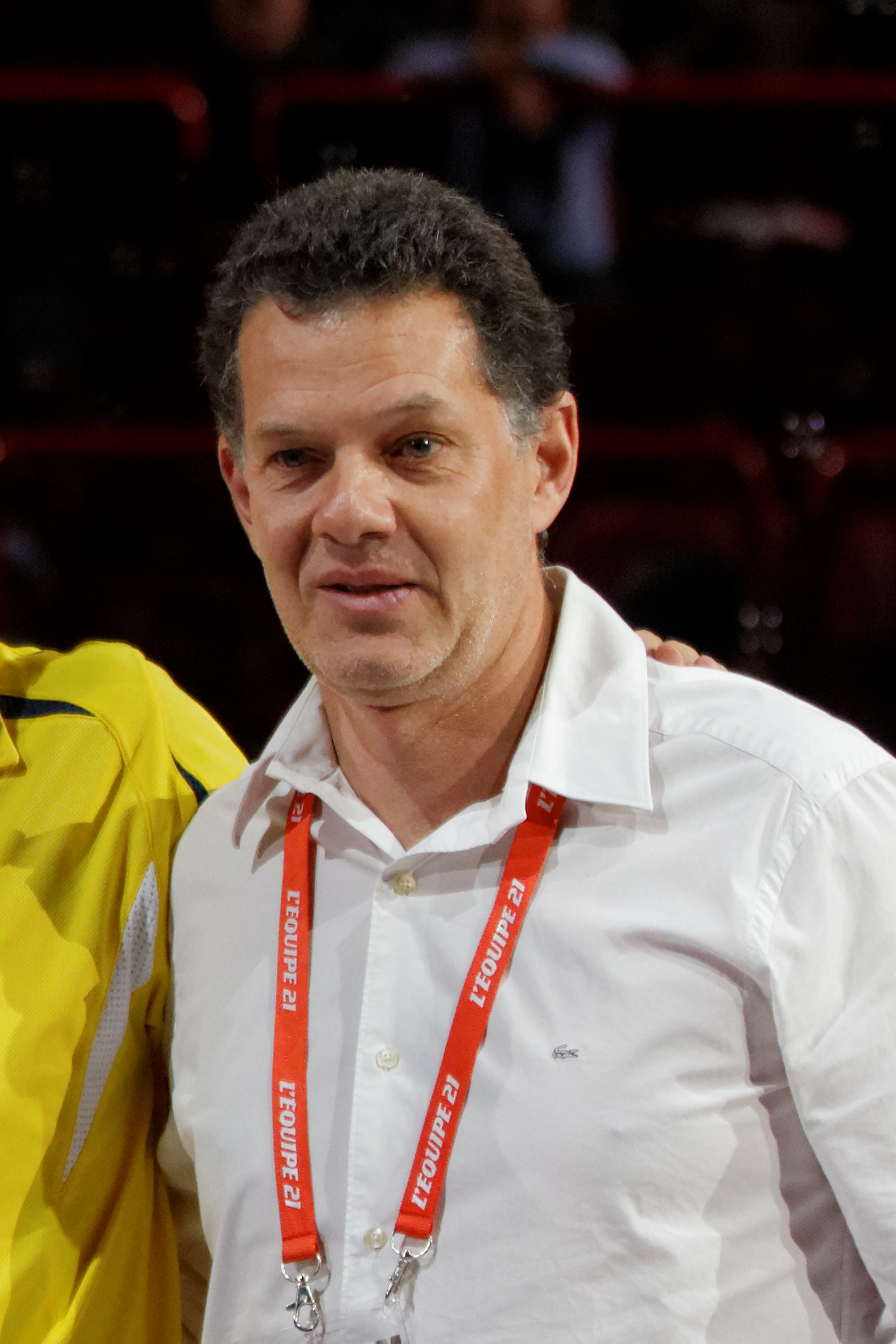
- Chila in 2013

Personal information
- Full name: Patrick Antoine Edouard Chila
- Nationality: France
- Born: 27 November 1969 (age 56)

Sport
- Sport: Table tennis
Medal record
Men's table tennis
Representing France
Olympic Games
Bronze medal – third place	2000 Sydney	Doubles
World Championships
Silver medal – second place	1997 Manchester	Team
World Cup
Bronze medal – third place	1994 Nimes	Team
European Championships
Gold medal – first place	1994 Birmingham	Team
Gold medal – first place	1998 Eindhoven	Team
Gold medal – first place	2000 Bremen	Doubles
Silver medal – second place	1996 Bratislava	Team
Bronze medal – third place	1994 Birmingham	Singles
Bronze medal – third place	2002 Zagreb	Doubles
Bronze medal – third place	2007 Belgrade	Doubles

Patrick Antoine Edouard Chila (born 27 November 1969 in Ris-Orangis, Essonne) is a French table tennis player who has competed at five Olympics from 1992 to 2008.

He won a bronze medal with Jean-Philippe Gatien in doubles at the 2000 Olympics. He is also four-time champion of France (1998, 2003, 2007, 2008).

He announced his international retirement after his participation in the Beijing Olympic Games in 2008.

== See also ==
- List of athletes with the most appearances at Olympic Games
