= Singapore at the 2007 SEA Games =

Singapore at the 2007 Southeast Asian Games
- IOC code: SIN
- NOC: Singapore National Olympic Council
- Website: www.singaporeolympics.com (in English)

in Nakhon Ratchasima
- Competitors: 442 in 35 sports
- Flag bearer: Lee Yen Hui Kendrick
- Medals Ranked 5th: Gold 43 Silver 43 Bronze 41 Total 127

Southeast Asian Games appearances (overview)
- 1959; 1961; 1965; 1967; 1969; 1971; 1973; 1975; 1977; 1979; 1981; 1983; 1985; 1987; 1989; 1991; 1993; 1995; 1997; 1999; 2001; 2003; 2005; 2007; 2009; 2011; 2013; 2015; 2017; 2019; 2021; 2023; 2025; 2027; 2029

Singapore participated in the 2007 Southeast Asian Games (SEA) which were held in the city of Nakhon Ratchasima, Thailand from 6 to 16 December 2007.

Singapore won a record 43 gold medals at the SEA Games.

== Participation details ==
Singapore sent a total contingent of 658 to the 2007 SEA Games: of 442 competitors and 216 officials. The largest contingent ever sent to an away games, they participated in 35 of the 45 sports in the games.

Participation and medal targets
Sport	Competitors	Gold Medal Target	Gold Medals in previous games
Archery	16		0
Aquatics	22 (Swimming), 13 (Water polo)	8 (Swimming), 1 (Water polo)	13 (Swimming), 1 (Water polo)
Athletics	24		3
Badminton	20		0
Basketball	12		Not held
Billiards and Snooker	10		1
Bodybuilding	4		2
Bowling	12		0
Canoeing/Kayaking	4		0
Cycling	3		0
Dancesport	2		0
Equestrian	5		0
Fencing	27		1
Football	29		0
Golf	5		0
Gymnastics	12		2
Hockey	32		Not held
Judo	6		0
Karatedo	2		0
Lawn bowls	5		0
Muay Thai	3		Did not participate
Pencak Silat	14	3	1
Pétanque	4		0
Polo	6		Not held
Rowing	2		0
Rugby	24		Not held
Sailing	25	4	7
Sepaktakraw	10		0
Shooting	20 (shooting), 8 (skeet and trap)	5	3
Softball	34		0
Squash	2		Did not participate
Table tennis	10		6
Taekwondo	3		0
Triathlon	5		1
Wushu	7		1

No athletes were fielded for Baseball, Boxing, Chess, Handball, Netball, Tennis, Traditional boat race, Volleyball, Weightlifting and Wrestling.

== Medals ==
Singapore entered the games expecting a Gold medal hail of between 35 and 45. On 12 December 2007, the target was raised and 42 - 45.

Rank	Sport	Gold	Silver	Bronze	Total
1	Aquatics - Swimming	11	9	6	26
2	Shooting	8	6	6	20
3	Table tennis	7	2	0	9
4	Sailing	4	6	3	13
5	Gymnastics	4	3	1	8
6	Bowling	3	0	1	4
7	Fencing	1	2	5	8
8	Wushu	1	2	0	3
9	Athletics	1	0	1	2
9	Pencak Silat	1	0	1	2
11	Aquatics - Water Polo	1	0	0	1
11	Triathlon	1	0	0	1
13	Badminton	0	4	2	6
14	Billiards and Snooker	0	2	2	4
15	Bodybuilding	0	1	1	2
15	Rugby	0	1	1	2
15	Softball	0	1	1	2
18	Hockey	0	1	0	1
18	Judo	0	1	0	1
18	Lawn bowls	0	1	0	1
18	Polo	0	1	0	1
22	Muay Thai	0	0	3	3
23	Canoe/Kayak	0	0	2	2
24	Archery	0	0	1	1
24	Football	0	0	1	1
24	Karatedo	0	0	1	1
24	Petanque	0	0	1	1
24	Rowing	0	0	1	1
Totals (28 entries)		43	43	41	127

== Significant results ==
- Singapore retained pole position in Swimming, despite the absence of Joscelin Yeo who has since retired. 10 of the 22 swimmers were first-timers. In all, they broke four games records, nine national records, four U17 national records, and recorded 26 personal bests.
- The Table tennis contingent swept all seven gold medals in the sport, the first time Singapore had done so in the SEA games.
- The water polo team retained their title for the 22nd consecutive time since 1965, despite having eight new members in a team of 13.
