= Pencak silat at the 2007 SEA Games =

Pencak Silat at the 2007 SEA Games was held in the Sung Noen Municipality Hall, Sung Noen, Nakhon Ratchasima, Thailand.

== Medal tally ==
* Host nation (Thailand)

Rank	Nation	Gold	Silver	Bronze	Total
1	Indonesia	5	3	4	12
2	Thailand*	4	1	6	11
3	Vietnam	3	5	1	9
4	Singapore	1	0	1	2
5	Malaysia	0	1	6	7
6	Myanmar	0	1	3	4
7	Philippines	0	1	2	3
8	Brunei	0	1	0	1
9	Laos	0	0	1	1
Totals (9 entries)		13	13	24	50

== Medalists ==
=== Art ===
Event	Gold	Silver	Bronze
Women's singles	Tuti Winarni; Indonesia	Norleyermah Haji Raya; Brunei	Angkana Aunkasiwet; Thailand

=== Combat ===
==== Men ====
Event	Gold	Silver	Bronze
Class A 45–50 kg	Dian Kristianto; Indonesia	Niphon Jantaro; Thailand	Htein Lin; Myanmar
Class A 45–50 kg	Dian Kristianto; Indonesia	Niphon Jantaro; Thailand	Jul-Omar Abdulhakim; Philippines
Class B 50–55 kg	Trần Văn Toàn; Vietnam	M. Andi Supiantoro; Indonesia	Tin Oo; Myanmar
Class B 50–55 kg	Trần Văn Toàn; Vietnam	M. Andi Supiantoro; Indonesia	Nanthachai Khansakorn; Thailand
Class C 55–60 kg	Prasit Warlam; Thailand	Thein Soe; Myanmar	Suhud Indratno; Indonesia
Class C 55–60 kg	Prasit Warlam; Thailand	Thein Soe; Myanmar	Olane Sihalath; Laos
Class D 60–65 kg	Chaiwat Nimma; Thailand	Lê Ngọc Tân; Vietnam	Pujo Janoko; Indonesia
Class D 60–65 kg	Chaiwat Nimma; Thailand	Lê Ngọc Tân; Vietnam	Ahmad Shahril Jailudin; Malaysia
Class E 65–70 kg	Abdulloh Mahlee; Thailand	Nguyễn Duy Chiến; Vietnam	Ramdhani Rahmat Fitroh; Indonesia
Class E 65–70 kg	Abdulloh Mahlee; Thailand	Nguyễn Duy Chiến; Vietnam	Min Swe; Myanmar
Class F 70–75 kg	Mohamed Noor Rafili Ramli; Singapore	Đinh Công Sơn; Vietnam	Mulyono; Indonesia
Class F 70–75 kg	Mohamed Noor Rafili Ramli; Singapore	Đinh Công Sơn; Vietnam	Prajaksin Kaenjanbai; Thailand
Class G 75–80 kg	Rony Syaifullah; Indonesia	Vũ Thế Hoàng; Vietnam	Faizal Abdulleh; Malaysia
Class G 75–80 kg	Rony Syaifullah; Indonesia	Vũ Thế Hoàng; Vietnam	Saksit Kaewphet; Thailand

==== Women ====
Event	Gold	Silver	Bronze
Class A 45–50 kg	Pengky Simbar; Indonesia	Rina Jordana Haji Adnan; Malaysia	Nur As'Shiken Amran; Singapore
Class A 45–50 kg	Pengky Simbar; Indonesia	Rina Jordana Haji Adnan; Malaysia	Nguyễn Ngọc Anh; Vietnam
Class B 50–55 kg	Huỳnh Thị Thu Hồng; Vietnam	Rosmayani; Indonesia	Wan Nurul Hidaya Abdulrazak; Malaysia
Class B 50–55 kg	Huỳnh Thị Thu Hồng; Vietnam	Rosmayani; Indonesia	Emraida Asmad; Philippines
Class C 55–60 kg	Jutarat Noytapa; Thailand	Nerlyn Huinda; Philippines	Malini Mohamad; Malaysia
Class D 60–65 kg	Ni Nyoman Supartini; Indonesia	Nguyễn Thị Phương Thuý; Vietnam	Emy Latif; Malaysia
Class D 60–65 kg	Ni Nyoman Supartini; Indonesia	Nguyễn Thị Phương Thuý; Vietnam	Monruthai Bangsalad; Thailand
Class E 65–70 kg	Lê Thị Hồng Ngoan; Vietnam	Puspa Endah Fitriani; Indonesia	Ratanaporn Promduang; Thailand
Class E 65–70 kg	Lê Thị Hồng Ngoan; Vietnam	Puspa Endah Fitriani; Indonesia	Mastura Sapuan; Malaysia
