= Judo at the 2007 SEA Games =

Judo competition

Judo at the 2007 SEA Games was held in the Gymnasium at Rajamangala University of Technology Isan, Nakhon Ratchasima, Thailand.

== Medal tally ==
* Host nation (Thailand)

Rank	Nation	Gold	Silver	Bronze	Total
1	Thailand*	8	4	3	15
2	Vietnam	3	1	7	11
3	Laos	2	1	3	6
4	Myanmar	1	4	3	8
5	Indonesia	1	3	5	9
6	Philippines	1	2	6	9
7	Singapore	0	1	0	1
8	Malaysia	0	0	3	3
Totals (8 entries)		16	16	30	62

== Medalists ==
=== Kata ===
Event	Gold	Silver	Bronze
Nage-no-kata	Laos (LAO); Chindavon Syvanevilay; Chansy Vienvilay	Thailand (THA); Bodin Panjabutra; Chanchai Suksuwan	Vietnam (VIE); Nguyễn Quốc Tuấn; Nguyễn Quốc Thắng
Jū-no-kata	Laos (LAO); Mayouly Phanouvong; Phonevan Syamphone	Singapore (SIN); Cai Renjun; Ngo Yee Ling	Thailand (THA); Nisachon Sawatchai; Pitima Thaweerattanasinp

=== Men ===
Event	Gold	Silver	Bronze
−60 kg	Siam Thanaporn; Thailand	Hein Latt Zaw; Myanmar	Toni irawan Indonesia
−60 kg	Siam Thanaporn; Thailand	Hein Latt Zaw; Myanmar	Nguyễn Quốc Hưng; Vietnam
−66 kg	Paradon Saibua; Thailand	Palitha Phrommala; Laos	Mohd Fakhrul Izzat Afandi; Malaysia
−66 kg	Paradon Saibua; Thailand	Palitha Phrommala; Laos	Peter Taslim; Indonesia
−73 kg	Achilleus Ralli; Thailand	Zaw Naing; Myanmar	Marjan Abdullah; Malaysia
−73 kg	Achilleus Ralli; Thailand	Zaw Naing; Myanmar	Jimmy Anggoro; Indonesia
−81 kg	John Baylon; Philippines	Joe Taslim; Indonesia	Ronnarong Maruethachinda; Thailand
−81 kg	John Baylon; Philippines	Joe Taslim; Indonesia	Tô Hải Long; Vietnam
−90 kg	Wuttikrai Srisoprap; Thailand	Krisna Bayu; Indonesia	Rick Jayson Senales; Philippines
−90 kg	Wuttikrai Srisoprap; Thailand	Krisna Bayu; Indonesia	Zin Linn Aung; Myanmar
−100 kg	Pongpitsanu Pratepwadtananon; Thailand	Ade Sujana; Indonesia	Đặng Hào; Vietnam
−100 kg	Pongpitsanu Pratepwadtananon; Thailand	Ade Sujana; Indonesia	Maung Maung San; Myanmar
+100 kg	Tharalat Sutthiphun; Thailand	Tomohiko Hoshina; Philippines	Deni Zulfendri; Indonesia
+100 kg	Tharalat Sutthiphun; Thailand	Tomohiko Hoshina; Philippines	Khemkham Kommanivong; Laos

=== Women ===
Event	Gold	Silver	Bronze
−48 kg	Văn Ngọc Tú; Vietnam	Nancy Quillotes; Philippines	Yuliati; Indonesia
−48 kg	Văn Ngọc Tú; Vietnam	Nancy Quillotes; Philippines	Noor Maizura Zainon; Malaysia
−52 kg	Trần Thị Bích Trâm; Vietnam	Om Pongchaliew; Thailand	Helen Dawa; Philippines
−52 kg	Trần Thị Bích Trâm; Vietnam	Om Pongchaliew; Thailand	Phonenaly Sayarath; Laos
−57 kg	Nguyễn Thị Kiều; Vietnam	Thandar Win; Myanmar	Estiegay Liwanen; Philippines
−57 kg	Nguyễn Thị Kiều; Vietnam	Thandar Win; Myanmar	Wanwisa Songpradit; Thailand
−63 kg	Aye Aye Aung; Myanmar	Ancharee Tongseesung; Thailand	Nguyễn Thị Như Ý Vietnam
−63 kg	Aye Aye Aung; Myanmar	Ancharee Tongseesung; Thailand	Phonethip Sonetavan; Laos
−70 kg	Surattana Thongsri; Thailand	Bùi Thị Hoa; Vietnam	Lay Kaiyar Aung; Myanmar
−70 kg	Surattana Thongsri; Thailand	Bùi Thị Hoa; Vietnam	Karen Ann Solomon; Philippines
−78 kg	Ira Purnamasari; Indonesia	Patcharee Pichaipat; Thailand	Ruth Dugaduga; Philippines
−78 kg	Ira Purnamasari; Indonesia	Patcharee Pichaipat; Thailand	Trương Nguyệt Ánh; Vietnam
+78 kg	Niramon Promtaeng; Thailand	Khin Myo Thu; Myanmar	Nguyễn Thị Thu Loan; Vietnam
+78 kg	Niramon Promtaeng; Thailand	Khin Myo Thu; Myanmar	Erika Joy Ponciano; Philippines
