= Bodybuilding at the 2007 SEA Games =

Bodybuilding at the 2007 Southeast Asian Games was held at the 70th Anniversary Hall, Nakhon Ratchasima Rajabhat University, Nakhon Ratchasima, Thailand. The body building schedule began on December 10 to December 11.

== Medal tally ==
* Host nation (Thailand)

Rank	Nation	Gold	Silver	Bronze	Total
1	Thailand*	2	1	1	4
2	Vietnam	1	2	0	3
3	Indonesia	1	1	2	4
4	Myanmar	1	0	0	1
5	Singapore	0	1	1	2
6	Philippines	0	0	1	1
Totals (6 entries)		5	5	5	15

== Medalists ==
=== Men ===
Event	Gold	Silver	Bronze
−55 kg	Phạm Văn Mách; Vietnam	Jiraphan Pongkam; Thailand	Uus Muhammad Yusuf; Indonesia
−60 kg	Andy Arselawandi; Indonesia	Amir Zainal; Singapore	Somkhit Sumethowetchakun; Thailand
−70 kg	Aung Khaing Win; Myanmar	Syafrizaldy; Indonesia	Sasi Zura Raush; Singapore
−80 kg	Sitthi Charoenrith; Thailand	Nguyễn Anh Tài; Vietnam	Adi Fuadi; Indonesia

=== Women ===
Event	Gold	Silver	Bronze
Fitness	Apiporn Chomsomboon; Thailand	Phạm Ngọc Trang; Vietnam	Dulce Carina Purugganan; Philippines
