= Softball at the 2007 SEA Games =

- Venue: NRRU Football Field
- Nations: 5

Softball was played at the 2007 Southeast Asian Games. The Philippines national softball teams were the defending gold medalists.

The games were held at the NRRU Football Field, with 2 events: men's softball and women's softball. The tournament format is a single round-robin followed by 2-step knockout stage, with the #1 team getting a bye up to the grand final, while the #2 gets a bye up to the final.

The Philippines men's and women's softball teams defended their gold medals successfully, finishing undefeated in the tournament.

== Men's tournament ==
=== Pool play ===
Pos	Team	Pld	W	L	RF	RA	RD	PCT	(Philippines)	(Indonesia)	(Thailand)	(Singapore)	(Malaysia)
1	Philippines	4	4	0	46	10	+36	1.000	—	9–2	10–6	22–2	5–0
2	Indonesia	4	3	1	38	13	+25	.750	2–9	—	10–4	15–0	11–0
3	Thailand	4	2	2	19	26	−7	.500	6–10	4–10	—	7–6	2–0
4	Singapore	4	1	3	12	46	−34	.250	2–22	0–15	6–7	—	4–2
5	Malaysia	4	0	4	2	22	−20	.000	0–5	0–11	0–2	2–4	—

=== Playoffs ===
Semifinal
1	Philippines	3
2	Indonesia	1
3	Thailand	5
4	Singapore	7

Final
2	Indonesia	4
4	Singapore	1

Grand Final
1	Philippines	11
2	Indonesia	2

== Women's tournament ==
=== Pool play ===
Pos	Team	Pld	W	L	RF	RA	RD	PCT	(Philippines)	(Singapore)	(Indonesia)	(Thailand)
1	Philippines	3	3	0	30	4	+26	1.000	—	8–1	13–2	9–1
2	Singapore	3	2	1	12	12	0	.667	1–8	—	9–4	2–0
3	Indonesia	3	1	2	9	23	−14	.333	2–13	4–9	—	3–1
4	Thailand	3	0	3	2	14	−12	.000	1–9	0–2	1–3	—

=== Playoffs ===
Semifinal
1	Philippines	7
2	Singapore	0
4	Thailand	4
3	Indonesia	0

Final
2	Singapore	4
4	Thailand	2

Grand Final
1	Philippines	7
2	Singapore	0

== Medal summary ==
=== Medal tally ===
* Host nation (Thailand)

Rank	Nation	Gold	Silver	Bronze	Total
1	Philippines	2	0	0	2
2	Singapore	0	1	1	2
3	Indonesia	0	1	0	1
4	Thailand*	0	0	1	1
Totals (4 entries)		2	2	2	6

=== Medalists ===
Event	Gold	Silver	Bronze
Men	Philippines (PHI); Anthony Santos; Apolonio Rosales; Ben Maravilles; Dario Bacarisas; Edzel Bacarisas; Isidro Abello; Jasper Cabrera; Joseph Roldan Bacarisas; Manuel Bacarisas, Jr. Manuel Binarao; Mark Rae Ramirez; Marlon Pagkaliwagan; Melvin Villegas; Orlando Binarao; Oscar Bradshaw IV; Rogelio Rojas, Jr. Vectorio Enriquez, Jr.	Indonesia (INA); Adnan Putra Djani; Amiruddin Roy Umbasan; Arman Ahmad Rusmana; Dadang Bayu Sarifudin; Dedi Purnomo; Fricharda Oestabima; Gunawan Pramono; Heri Haeruman; Jaicaria; Jajat Darajat Kusumah Negara; Michael Trisnadi; Mohammad Adi Saputra; Muhammad Said; Otto Wahyu Minarto; Rizkar Radhani; Rizky Paramasatya Nasution; Teuku Ridwan	Singapore (SIN); Albert Chia Leow Boon Heng; Alex Lim Zhi Wei; Aston Zheng Long; Collin Toh Boon Han; Darren Goh Chin Thong; Eugene See Yong Shun; Goh Chang Yit; Goh Keng Ngee; Jeffrey Heng Zhi Wei; Kenneth Ong Chin Chiu; Leonard Sim Kiang Kai; Marcus Lew Cheng Chye; Ng Cheong Yong; So Beng Seng; Tan Kok Siong; Tay Hung Kiat; Xie Zhao Shang
Women	Philippines (PHI); Belen Asok; Cloiene Muyco; Dione Macasu; Elaine Bacarisas; Emily Tayag; Esmeralda Tayag; Gedda Valencia; Janet Vallite; Karina Aribal; Luvelyn Maganda; Mary Joy Lasquite; Nelsa Delagente; Nimpa Baral; Sarah Jane Agravante; Sheirylou Valenzuela; Syrel Ramos; Yocel Aguilar	Singapore (SIN); Chan Meilin; Chuang Chea Chee; Elane Chua Ling Ling; Fu Xinghan; Germaine Tan Qiu Wen; Guo Yanxiu Yan; Ho Sz Wha; Irianti Putri Irawan Fatullah; Keong Yumei; Koh Ruoh Yan; Michelle Koh Aimei; Norlyn Ahmad-Lim; Norsalina Shafiee; Sharon Choo Wei Ling; Suzanne Tan Su Shuen; Tay Hui Jie; Yong Wei Yi	Thailand (THA); Amnuay Klumdeang; Chittawadee Sangsuwan; Chompoonut Klongseema; Jarupa Somoumjan; Kantrakorn Jittsaree; Kunnatee Kamoljttkulchorn; Pasinee Montalampa; Pattama Srichan; Pinid Lee-udom; Saowaluk Klubjarid; Somporn Klaysuan; Sumalee Suansara; Sureerat Khamnet; Tassaneewan Kaowpanya; Tanyaporn Rujihan; Thanita Kuiapen; Waraporn Konyuen

Preceded by 2005	Softball at the Southeast Asian Games; 2007 Southeast Asian Games	Succeeded by 2011
