= Pétanque at the 2007 SEA Games =

Petanque at the 2007 SEA Games

Pétanque at the 2007 SEA Games was held in the Pétanque Court in Suranaree University of Technology, Nakhon Ratchasima, Thailand.

== Medal tally ==
* Host nation (Thailand)

Rank	Nation	Gold	Silver	Bronze	Total
1	Thailand*	4	4	1	9
2	Cambodia	2	3	2	7
3	Laos	2	0	5	7
4	Vietnam	1	1	6	8
5	Philippines	0	1	0	1
6	Malaysia	0	0	3	3
7	Singapore	0	0	1	1
Totals (7 entries)		9	9	18	36

== Medalists ==
=== Men ===
Event	Gold	Silver	Bronze
Singles	Sok Chanmean; Cambodia	Phakin Phukram; Thailand	Huỳnh Công Tâm; Vietnam
Singles	Sok Chanmean; Cambodia	Phakin Phukram; Thailand	Sukhaphon Phonpaseut; Laos
Doubles	Cambodia; Ok Chimi; Yim Sophorm	Vietnam; Võ Văn Bé; Võ Văn Lâu	Laos; Douangmisy Ponexay; Vongvone Bouadeng
Doubles	Cambodia; Ok Chimi; Yim Sophorm	Vietnam; Võ Văn Bé; Võ Văn Lâu	Thailand; Athaphon Kanthaphalee; Pharit Thongpriam
Triples	Thailand; Mongkol Boakeaw; Suksan Piachan; Supan Thongpoo; Thaloengkiat Phusa-at	Cambodia; Chao Ratana; Kim Vanna; So Randyne; Tep Nora	Vietnam; Lê Hồng Phước; Phạm Thanh Phong; Võ Tân Xuân; Vũ Khang Duy
Triples	Thailand; Mongkol Boakeaw; Suksan Piachan; Supan Thongpoo; Thaloengkiat Phusa-at	Cambodia; Chao Ratana; Kim Vanna; So Randyne; Tep Nora	Laos; Khamphavong Vathanxay; Khamvongsa Soulasith; Panyabandith Vongphachanh; Sengdao Saysamone
Shooting	Khamphavong Vathanxay; Laos	Thaloengkiat Phusa-at; Thailand	Lê Hồng Phước; Vietnam
Shooting	Khamphavong Vathanxay; Laos	Thaloengkiat Phusa-at; Thailand	Saiful Bahri Musmin; Malaysia

=== Women ===
Event	Gold	Silver	Bronze
Singles	Phantipha Wongchuvej; Thailand	Ouk Sreymom; Cambodia	Vongsavhas Mimee; Laos
Singles	Phantipha Wongchuvej; Thailand	Ouk Sreymom; Cambodia	Rabiah Abdul Rahman; Malaysia
Doubles	Thailand; Kannika Limwanich; Suphannee Wongsut	Cambodia; Duch Sophorn; Ke Leng	Malaysia; Roslina Abdul Rashid; Wan Sazimah Wan Yaacob
Doubles	Thailand; Kannika Limwanich; Suphannee Wongsut	Cambodia; Duch Sophorn; Ke Leng	Vietnam; Trần Thị Phương Em; Ngô Hồng Lê
Triples	Thailand; Janya Kerdtoh; Nattaya Yoothong; Thongsri Thamakord; Uraiwan Hiranwong	Philippines; Casem Gema; Habluetzel Meldred; Vicente Mildred; Violeta de la Cruz	Vietnam; Đỗ Thị Liên; Nguyễn Thị Hiền; Nguyễn Thị Trúc Mai; Võ Thị Thuỳ Linh
Triples	Thailand; Janya Kerdtoh; Nattaya Yoothong; Thongsri Thamakord; Uraiwan Hiranwong	Philippines; Casem Gema; Habluetzel Meldred; Vicente Mildred; Violeta de la Cruz	Singapore; Goh Heoi Bin; Heo Boon Huay; Nur Izzati Ismail; Ong Ruo Ning
Shooting	Chanchamone Vongsavhas; Laos	Thongsri Thamakord; Thailand	Nguyễn Thị Hiền; Vietnam
Shooting	Chanchamone Vongsavhas; Laos	Thongsri Thamakord; Thailand	Em Piseth; Cambodia

=== Mixed ===
Event	Gold	Silver	Bronze
Mixed doubles	Vietnam; Thạch Hữu Tâm; Vũ Thị Thu	Thailand; Eakasit Padungsup; Taddaw Pundech	Cambodia; Duong Dina; Or Chandaren
Mixed doubles	Vietnam; Thạch Hữu Tâm; Vũ Thị Thu	Thailand; Eakasit Padungsup; Taddaw Pundech	Laos; Khampasy Toulachack; Lienkeo Ounkeo

== Sources ==
1. https://web.archive.org/web/20190924215918/http://www.seagfoffice.org/pdf/pdf_1450240409_3923.pdf
