= Taekwondo at the 2007 SEA Games =

Taekwondo competition

Taekwondo at the 2007 SEA Games were held in the Auditorium, Wongchawalitkul University, Nakhon Ratchasima, Thailand

== Medal tally ==
* Host nation (Thailand)

Rank	Nation	Gold	Silver	Bronze	Total
1	Thailand*	8	3	2	13
2	Vietnam	3	4	6	13
3	Malaysia	2	1	5	8
4	Philippines	1	4	6	11
5	Myanmar	1	1	4	6
6	Indonesia	1	1	1	3
7	Laos	0	1	5	6
8	Cambodia	0	1	2	3
Totals (8 entries)		16	16	31	63

== Medalists ==
=== Men ===
Event	Gold	Silver	Bronze
Finweight –54 kg	Chutchawal Khawlaor; Thailand	Nguyễn Hữu Nhân; Vietnam	Mohamad Hafiz Kader Sultan; Malaysia
Finweight –54 kg	Chutchawal Khawlaor; Thailand	Nguyễn Hữu Nhân; Vietnam	Phouthasone Thammavong; Laos
Flyweight –58 kg	Nattapong Tewawetchapong; Thailand	Outhasak Phouthavong; Laos	Lê Huỳnh Châu; Vietnam
Flyweight –58 kg	Nattapong Tewawetchapong; Thailand	Outhasak Phouthavong; Laos	Carlos Jose Padilla V Philippines
Bantamweight –62 kg	Nacha Punthong; Thailand	Ryan Chong Wy Lunn; Malaysia	Nguyễn Thái Hoàng Minh; Vietnam
Bantamweight –62 kg	Nacha Punthong; Thailand	Ryan Chong Wy Lunn; Malaysia	Thongsavay Phommachack; Laos
Featherweight –67 kg	Tshomlee Go; Philippines	Nguyễn Minh Hiếu; Vietnam	Sawatvilay Phimmasone; Laos
Featherweight –67 kg	Tshomlee Go; Philippines	Nguyễn Minh Hiếu; Vietnam	Chanatha Thanaroekchai; Thailand
Lightweight –72 kg	Patiwat Thiongsalap; Thailand	Daren Tubbs; Cambodia	Mangkeua Phimmasone; Laos
Lightweight –72 kg	Patiwat Thiongsalap; Thailand	Daren Tubbs; Cambodia	Yulius Fernando; Indonesia
Welterweight –78 kg	Dam Srichan; Thailand	Basuki Nugroho; Indonesia	Ernesto Juan Mendoza III; Philippines
Welterweight –78 kg	Dam Srichan; Thailand	Basuki Nugroho; Indonesia	Zar Ni Htun; Myanmar
Middleweight –84 kg	Nguyễn Trọng Cường; Vietnam	Alexander Briones; Philippines	Maung Maung Oo; Myanmar
Middleweight –84 kg	Nguyễn Trọng Cường; Vietnam	Alexander Briones; Philippines	Wong Kai Meng; Malaysia
Heavyweight +84 kg	Nguyễn Văn Hùng; Vietnam	Nopporn Tuchsabut; Thailand	Rozy Khamis; Malaysia
Heavyweight +84 kg	Nguyễn Văn Hùng; Vietnam	Nopporn Tuchsabut; Thailand	Sorn Elit; Cambodia

=== Women ===
Event	Gold	Silver	Bronze
Finweight –47 kg	Buttree Puedpong; Thailand	Thiri Tint Lwin; Myanmar	Kathleen Eunice Alora; Philippines
Finweight –47 kg	Buttree Puedpong; Thailand	Thiri Tint Lwin; Myanmar	Phengsisavath Amphavan; Laos
Flyweight –51 kg	Elaine Teo Shueh Fhern; Malaysia	Loraine Lorelie Catalan; Philippines	Chhoeun Puthearim; Cambodia
Flyweight –51 kg	Elaine Teo Shueh Fhern; Malaysia	Loraine Lorelie Catalan; Philippines	Đỗ Thị Bích Hạnh; Vietnam
Bantamweight –55 kg	Seo Soe Myar; Myanmar	Ladawan Wachiramekakun; Thailand	Hoàng Hà Giang; Vietnam
Bantamweight –55 kg	Seo Soe Myar; Myanmar	Ladawan Wachiramekakun; Thailand	Esther Marie Singson; Philippines
Featherweight –59 kg	Nguyễn Thị Hoài Thu; Vietnam	Kirstie Alora; Philippines	Watcharaporn Dongnoi; Thailand
Featherweight –59 kg	Nguyễn Thị Hoài Thu; Vietnam	Kirstie Alora; Philippines	May Sandar Kyaw Win; Myanmar
Lightweight –63 kg	Chonnapas Premwaew; Thailand	Trịnh Kim Tường Vân; Vietnam	Veronica Domingo; Philippines
Lightweight –63 kg	Chonnapas Premwaew; Thailand	Trịnh Kim Tường Vân; Vietnam	San Ngu Wah Sue; Myanmar
Welterweight –67 kg	Cassandra Haller; Thailand	Mary Antoinette Rivero; Philippines	Norfaradila Zairy; Malaysia
Welterweight –67 kg	Cassandra Haller; Thailand	Mary Antoinette Rivero; Philippines	Trần Thị Ngọc Trâm; Vietnam
Middleweight –72 kg	Che Chew Chan; Malaysia	Bùi Thu Hiền; Vietnam	Maria Criselda Roxas; Philippines
Heavyweight +72 kg	Amalia Kurniasih Palupi; Indonesia	Rapatkorn Prasopsuk; Thailand	Shu Seo Hie; Malaysia
Heavyweight +72 kg	Amalia Kurniasih Palupi; Indonesia	Rapatkorn Prasopsuk; Thailand	Vũ Âu Thuỵ Kim Linh; Vietnam
