= Triathlon at the 2007 SEA Games =

Triathlon at the 2007 SEA Games was held at the Pattaya, Chon Buri, Thailand

== Medal winners ==
Event	Gold	Silver	Bronze
Men's duathlon	Ryan Mendoza; Philippines	Amnat Srichat; Thailand	August Benedicto; Philippines
Men's triathlon	Mok Ying Ren; Singapore	George Vilog; Philippines	Arland Benedict Macasieb; Philippines
Women's duathlon	Saifon Piawong; Thailand	Sontiya Saiwaeo; Thailand	Analiza Dysangco; Philippines
Women's triathlon	Kimbeley Yap; Malaysia	Alessandra Araullo; Philippines	Maria Melliza Gayle Lucas; Philippines
