= Rowing at the 2007 SEA Games =

Rowing at the 2007 SEA Games was held in the Map Prachan Reservoir, Chon Buri, Thailand.

== Medalists ==
=== Men ===
Event	Gold	Silver	Bronze
Single sculls	Ruthtanaphol Theppibal; Thailand	Aung Ko Min; Myanmar	Jose Rodriguez; Philippines
Double sculls	Philippines; Jose Rodriguez; Benjamin Tolentino, Jr.	Thailand; Piyadanai Pantangthai; Ruthtanaphol Theppibal	Myanmar; Aung Ko Min; Kyaw Min Tun
Pairs	Vietnam; Dương Thanh Bình; Nguyễn Đình Huy	Indonesia; Agus Budi Aji; Iswandi	Thailand; Yuthana Hoihem; Pichet Trisittinoppakoon
Lightweight single sculls	Benjamin Tolentino, Jr. Philippines	Piyadanai Pantangthai; Thailand	Jamaluddin; Indonesia
Lightweight double sculls	Thailand; Anupong Thainjam; Ruthtanaphol Theppibal	Philippines; Alvin Amposta; Nestor Cordova	Myanmar; Thet Naing Soe; Zaw Zaw
Lightweight four	Indonesia; Agus Budi Aji; Ramdan Deni Prakasa; Rodiaman; Ketut Sukasna	Vietnam; Dương Thanh Bình; Nguyễn Đình Huy; Phan Thanh Hào; Vũ Đình Quyền	Thailand; Yuthana Hoihem; Leam Kangnok; Somkid Paothanom; Pichet Trisittinoppakoon

=== Women ===
Event	Gold	Silver	Bronze
Single sculls	Phuttharaksa Neegree; Thailand	Shwe Zin Latt; Myanmar	Đặng Thị Thắm; Vietnam
Double sculls	Thailand; Phuttharaksa Neegree; Bussayamas Phaengkathok	Philippines; Nida Cordova; Midelle Gabiligno	Vietnam; Đặng Thị Thắm; Nguyễn Thị Hựu
Lightweight single sculls	Bussayamas Phaengkathok; Thailand	Shwe Zin Latt; Myanmar	Saiyidah Aisyah; Singapore
Lightweight double sculls	Thailand; Phuttharaksa Neegree; Bussayamas Phaengkathok	Indonesia; Bertin; Sri Rahayu Masi	Philippines; Clothelde Nillas; Johna Lyn Pedrita
Lightweight four	Indonesia; Femy Batuwael; Femmy Yuwartini Elia; Ratna; Samlia	Myanmar; Chaw Su; Myint Myint Htwe; Shwe Zin Latt; Than Than Nwe	Vietnam; Cao Thị Tuyết; Mai Thị Dung; Trần Thị Sâm; Võ Thị Huyền Trang
