= Wushu at the 2007 SEA Games =

2007 Southeast Asian Games competition

- Venue: Kepkanchana Hall, Chanaphonlakhan Institute of Technology
- Dates: 7-10 December 2007

Wushu at the 2007 SEA Games was held at the Kepkanchana Hall in the Chanaphonlakhan Institute of Technology, Nakhon Ratchasima, Thailand.

== Medal tally ==
* Host nation (Thailand)

Rank	Nation	Gold	Silver	Bronze	Total
1	Vietnam	6	3	1	10
2	Philippines	2	2	3	7
3	Malaysia	2	2	1	5
4	Thailand*	2	1	3	6
5	Myanmar	1	2	4	7
6	Singapore	1	2	0	3
7	Indonesia	1	0	5	6
8	Laos	0	1	2	3
Totals (8 entries)		15	13	19	47

== Medalists ==
=== Taolu ===
==== Men ====
Event	Gold	Silver	Bronze
Duilian	Thailand; Somdej Srisuk; Wanchalerm Puangthong	Malaysia; Lim Yew Fai; Ng Say Yoke	Myanmar; Aung Si Thu; Myo Min Soe
Changquan	Aung Si Thu; Myanmar	Trần Đức Trọng; Vietnam	Andrie Mulianto; Indonesia
Nanquan	Willy Wang; Philippines	Phạm Quốc Khánh; Vietnam	Andrie Heriyanto; Indonesia
Taijiquan	Freddy; Indonesia	Goh Qiu Gin; Singapore	Daniel Parantac; Philippines

==== Women ====
Event	Gold	Silver	Bronze
Duilian	Singapore; Deng Ying Zhi; Ng Xin Ni	Vietnam; Nguyễn Thùy Dương; Nguyễn Thị Hà	Myanmar; Sandi Oo; That That Naing
Duilian	Singapore; Deng Ying Zhi; Ng Xin Ni	Vietnam; Nguyễn Thùy Dương; Nguyễn Thị Hà	Thailand; Benjawan Wiranuwat; Sattana Mayudee
Changquan	Vũ Trà My; Vietnam	Khor Poh Chin; Singapore	Susyana Tjhan; Indonesia
Nanquan	Diana Bong Siong Lin; Malaysia	none awarded	Tai Cheau Xuen; Malaysia
Nanquan	Vũ Thùy Linh; Vietnam	none awarded	Tai Cheau Xuen; Malaysia
Taijiquan	Chai Fong Ying; Malaysia	Ng Shin Yii; Malaysia	Janice Hung; Philippines

=== Sanda ===
==== Men ====
Event	Gold	Silver	Bronze
52 kg	Khwanyuen Chanthra; Thailand	Souphaphone; Laos	Rene Catalan; Philippines
52 kg	Khwanyuen Chanthra; Thailand	Souphaphone; Laos	Prayitno; Indonesia
56 kg	Phạm Anh Yên; Vietnam	Benjie Rivera; Philippines	Phoxay Aphailath; Laos
56 kg	Phạm Anh Yên; Vietnam	Benjie Rivera; Philippines	Maung Maung Than; Myanmar
65 kg	Nguyễn Văn Tuấn; Vietnam	Teerapong Saengdaeng; Thailand	Myo Ko; Myanmar
65 kg	Nguyễn Văn Tuấn; Vietnam	Teerapong Saengdaeng; Thailand	Youne Victorio Senduk; Indonesia

==== Women ====
Event	Gold	Silver	Bronze
48 kg	Nguyễn Thị Bích; Vietnam	Si Si Sein; Myanmar	Tukata Pradubbut; Thailand
48 kg	Nguyễn Thị Bích; Vietnam	Si Si Sein; Myanmar	Toyla; Laos
52 kg	Nguyễn Thúy Ngân; Vietnam	Mary Jane Estimar; Philippines	none awarded
60 kg	Mariane Mariano; Philippines	Yar Zar Khaing; Myanmar	Ratree Kraekhe; Thailand
60 kg	Mariane Mariano; Philippines	Yar Zar Khaing; Myanmar	Lương Thị Hoa; Vietnam
