= Rugby union at the 2007 SEA Games =

Rugby union at the 2007 Southeast Asian Games was held in the Suranaree Camp Stadium, Nakhon Ratchasima, Thailand.

== Medal table ==
* Host nation (Thailand)

Rank	Nation	Gold	Silver	Bronze	Total
1	Thailand*	2	0	0	2
2	Singapore	0	1	1	2
3	Philippines	0	1	0	1
4	Laos	0	0	1	1
Totals (4 entries)		2	2	2	6

== Medalists ==
Event	Gold	Silver	Bronze
Men	Thailand (THA); Anuchit Jaisutti; Chatree Phakhoontorn; Khanthipong Meepin; Noppadon Sangwan; Parwej Jarounapat; Pathomrat Sirisab; Rit Pattarapagorn; Sarayuth Thiengtrong; Sornsak Mitlux; Thummasuk Thumsanit; Totsaporn Vanidworaphong; Warongkorn Khankoet	Philippines (PHI); Andrew Wolff; Austin Dacanay; Benjamin Saunders; Garet Holgate; Harry Morris; Jasper Ching; Mark Chatting; Matthew Saunders; Michael Letts; Ndel Flower; Oliver Saunders; Rubert Zappa	Singapore (SIN); Bryan Ng Chung Jin; Daniel Mael Kwo Chow; Daniel Thiam Siong Oon; Derek Hua Jie Chan; Desmond Wee Tian Ren; Hadizan Jaaman; Hairul Naim; Kenneth David Teo; Mohammad Ismail Akadir; Mohammad Suhaimi Amran; Rong Jingxiang; Tong Chin Hong
Women	Thailand (THA); Boonsong Suansomboon; Butsaya Bunrak; Chitchanok Yusri; Jutamas Buktet; Naritsara Worakitsirikun; Oiatchara Somjit; Phanthippha Wongwangchan; Pranee Saipin; Praphaiphit Tarik; Saranya Khongphrai; Sujitra Suphapahttaranon; Uthumporn Liamrat	Singapore (SIN); Ang Wei Yi; Aslinda Abdullah; Chan Wan Cheng; Derelyn Chua Jialing; Eunice Tay Gek Sie; Haseena Allapitchay; Jeslyn Lim Siok Feng; Kristy Teh Chia Hwee; Leung Wai-Mun; Serena Yeoh Yai Kuan; Wang Shao-Ing; Zheng Yiting	Laos (LAO); Buavanh Chithikath; Khouanpasa Hansakda; Kongchai Somthavy; Malaythong Daosisavan; Manyvan Inthilath; Mouksy Vongsouvath; Phoutawan Vongvilay; Sisonexay Sonenaly; Soodthida Somphophet; Valailack Songkham; Viengphane Thongmala; Xeokham Latsavong
