= Muay Thai at the 2007 SEA Games =

Muay Thai at the 2007 Southeast Asian Games was held in the Gymnasium 1, Municipality Nakhon Ratchasima Sport Complex, Nakhon Ratchasima, Thailand.

== Medal tally ==
* Host nation (Thailand)

Rank	Nation	Gold	Silver	Bronze	Total
1	Thailand*	10	0	1	11
2	Laos	1	3	4	8
3	Philippines	0	5	5	10
4	Myanmar	0	3	4	7
5	Singapore	0	0	3	3
6	Indonesia	0	0	1	1
Totals (6 entries)		11	11	18	40

== Medalists ==
=== Men ===
Event	Gold	Silver	Bronze
Light flyweight 48 kg	Nattakorn Thongngarm; Thailand	Peta Ounpanya; Laos	Romnick Ghie Pabalate; Philippines
Light flyweight 48 kg	Nattakorn Thongngarm; Thailand	Peta Ounpanya; Laos	Soe Maung Maung; Myanmar
Flyweight; 51 kg	Sonsiri Rathrong; Thailand	Kyaw Min Htike; Myanmar	Roland Claro; Philippines
Flyweight; 51 kg	Sonsiri Rathrong; Thailand	Kyaw Min Htike; Myanmar	Bounma Vongchampa; Laos
Bantamweight; 54 kg	Sattra Paleenaram; Thailand	Brent Velasco; Philippines	Somdy Douangmala; Laos
Bantamweight; 54 kg	Sattra Paleenaram; Thailand	Brent Velasco; Philippines	Saw Than Khine Oo; Myanmar
Featherweight; 57 kg	Wuorawit Chitamnuay; Thailand	Vixay Bounthavy; Laos	Kyaw Thuya Hein; Myanmar
Featherweight; 57 kg	Wuorawit Chitamnuay; Thailand	Vixay Bounthavy; Laos	Zaidi Laruan; Philippines
Lightweight; 60 kg	Chatpol Petsongsri; Thailand	Tun Lin; Myanmar	Jay Olod; Philippines
Lightweight; 60 kg	Chatpol Petsongsri; Thailand	Tun Lin; Myanmar	Wong Lei Biao; Singapore
Light welterweight 63.5 kg	Panupan Tanjad; Thailand	Sengchan Sevonsa; Laos	Louis Wong Jianjun; Singapore
Light welterweight 63.5 kg	Panupan Tanjad; Thailand	Sengchan Sevonsa; Laos	Yan Naing Lin; Myanmar
Welterweight; 67 kg	Somkit Tumanil; Thailand	Thuya Aung; Myanmar	Jay Harold Gregorio; Philippines
Welterweight; 67 kg	Somkit Tumanil; Thailand	Thuya Aung; Myanmar	Hamixay Kheuakham; Laos

=== Women ===
Event	Gold	Silver	Bronze
Light flyweight 48 kg	Bounchane Seingpaseuth; Laos	May Libao; Philippines	Winda Merawati Purba; Indonesia
Light flyweight 48 kg	Bounchane Seingpaseuth; Laos	May Libao; Philippines	Yuphaporn Khottong; Thailand
Flyweight; 51 kg	Prakaidaw Pramaree; Thailand	Anna Joy Fernandez; Philippines	Brenda Shee Jin Hui; Singapore
Flyweight; 51 kg	Prakaidaw Pramaree; Thailand	Anna Joy Fernandez; Philippines	Paylor Xaypao; Laos
Bantamweight; 54 kg	Sararat Kongsawang; Thailand	Maricel Subang; Philippines	none awarded
Featherweight; 57 kg	Krittika Sitthan; Thailand	Ana Marie Rey; Philippines	none awarded
