= Canoeing at the 2007 SEA Games =

Canoe and Kayak at the 2007 SEA Games
- Location: Chon Buri Province, Thailand
- Date: December 11–14

Canoeing and Kayaking at the 2007 SEA Games was held at the Map Prachan Reservoir of the Pattaya in Chon Buri Province, Thailand. The canoe-kayak schedule began on December 11 to December 14.

== Medal tally ==
* Host nation (Thailand)

Rank	Nation	Gold	Silver	Bronze	Total
1	Indonesia	4	5	3	12
2	Myanmar	4	2	3	9
3	Vietnam	3	3	1	7
4	Thailand*	1	2	3	6
5	Singapore	0	0	2	2
Totals (5 entries)		12	12	12	36

== Medalists ==
=== Men ===
Event	Gold	Silver	Bronze
C1 500 m	Win Htike; Myanmar	Eka Octarorianus; Indonesia	Hoàng Hồng Anh; Vietnam
C1 1000 m	Eka Octarorianus; Indonesia	Win Htike; Myanmar	Thammarat Phaophandee; Thailand
C2 500 m	Vietnam; Lưu Văn Hoàn; Trần Văn Long	Indonesia; Asnawir; Roinadi	Myanmar; Saw Sata Pha Nu; Tun Tun Naing
C2 1000 m	Vietnam; Lưu Văn Hoàn; Trần Văn Long	Indonesia; Asnawir; Roinadi	Thailand; Rangsan Masurin; Yutthakan Khoawanna
K1 500 m	Trần Hữu Trí; Vietnam	Natthaphon Yatra; Thailand	John Feter Matules; Indonesia
K1 1000 m	Myint Tayzar Phone; Myanmar	Sayadin; Indonesia	Wichan Jaitieng; Thailand
K2 500 m	Indonesia; Sayadin; Silo	Vietnam; Nguyễn Thành Quang; Nguyễn Văn Chí	Myanmar; Khin Maung Myint; Myint Tayzar Phone
K2 1000 m	Thailand; Piyaphan Phaophat; Natthaphon Yatra	Vietnam; Nguyễn Thành Quang; Nguyễn Văn Chí	Indonesia; Diono; Kuat
K4 1000 m	Myanmar; Khin Maung Myint; Myint Tayzar Phone; Myo Zaw; Yan Paing	Thailand; Anusorn Sommit; Natthaphon Yatra; Patipat Soisungwan; Piyaphan Phaophat	Indonesia; John Feter Matules; Nursalam; Sayadin; Silo

=== Women ===
Event	Gold	Silver	Bronze
K1 500 m	Sarce Aronggear; Indonesia	Nguyễn Thị Hà; Vietnam	Naw Ahle Lashe; Myanmar
K2 500 m	Myanmar; Myint Myint Than; Naw Ahle Lashe	Indonesia; Royani Rais; Sarce Aronggear	Singapore; Annabelle Ng Xiang Ru; Geraldine Lee Wiling
K4 500 m	Indonesia; Kanti Santyawati; Rasima; Royani Rais; Sarce Aronggear	Myanmar; Myint Myint Than; Naw Ahle Lashe; Phyu Thi Oo; Thin Thin Kyu	Singapore; Andrea Chen Jiewen; Annabelle Ng Xiang Ru; Geraldine Lee Wiling; Irene Chua Peixuan
