= Fencing at the 2007 SEA Games =

Fencing at the 2007 SEA Games took place at the National Synchrotron Research Centre at the Suranaree University of Technology in Amphoe Mueang Nakhon Ratchasima, Nakhon Ratchasima Province, Thailand.

== Medal tally ==
* Host nation (Thailand)

Rank	Nation	Gold	Silver	Bronze	Total
1	Thailand*	5	1	3	9
2	Philippines	3	6	6	15
3	Vietnam	3	1	3	7
4	Singapore	1	2	5	8
5	Indonesia	0	2	4	6
6	Malaysia	0	0	2	2
7	Brunei	0	0	1	1
Totals (7 entries)		12	12	24	48

== Medalists ==
=== Men ===
Event	Gold	Silver	Bronze
Individual épée	Đỗ Hữu Cường; Vietnam	Lim Wei Wen; Singapore	Lin Qinghui; Singapore
Individual épée	Đỗ Hữu Cường; Vietnam	Lim Wei Wen; Singapore	Agustinus Peter Manuhutu; Indonesia
Team épée	Philippines; Almario Vizcayno; Armando Bernal; Avelino Victorino, Jr. Wilfredo Vizcayno, Jr.	Vietnam; Đỗ Hữu Cường; Nguyễn Tiến Nhật; Nguyễn Văn Định; Phạm Quốc Vương	Malaysia; Amir Yunos; Azroul Fazly Yusoff; Koh I Jie; Ruberchandran Ramachandran
Team épée	Philippines; Almario Vizcayno; Armando Bernal; Avelino Victorino, Jr. Wilfredo Vizcayno, Jr.	Vietnam; Đỗ Hữu Cường; Nguyễn Tiến Nhật; Nguyễn Văn Định; Phạm Quốc Vương	Singapore; Leong Kok Seng; Lim Wei Wen; Lin Qinghui; Nicholas Fang Kuo Wei
Individual foil	Emerson Segui; Philippines	Nontapat Panchan; Thailand	Rolando Canlas, Jr. Philippines
Individual foil	Emerson Segui; Philippines	Nontapat Panchan; Thailand	Zairul Zaimi Arsad; Malaysia
Team foil	Thailand; Nontapat Panchan; Parinya Horpechakit; Phatthanapong Srisawat; Suppakorn Sritang-orn	Philippines; Emerson Segui; Mark Denver Atienza; Ramil Endriano; Rolando Canlas, Jr.	Indonesia; Dadan Heri; Hardianus Samuel; Ismail Ibnu; Ricky Hafidz Jan Gunarto
Team foil	Thailand; Nontapat Panchan; Parinya Horpechakit; Phatthanapong Srisawat; Suppakorn Sritang-orn	Philippines; Emerson Segui; Mark Denver Atienza; Ramil Endriano; Rolando Canlas, Jr.	Singapore; Anthony Tsang Chi Yin; Eddie Sng Chong Guo; Eugene Chua Wee Hong; Wu Jie
Individual sabre	Wiradech Kothny; Thailand	Walbert Mendoza; Philippines	Mark Dhinesh Muthiah; Singapore
Individual sabre	Wiradech Kothny; Thailand	Walbert Mendoza; Philippines	Edmon Velez; Philippines
Team sabre	Thailand; Ekkathet Ket-iam; Kittikhun Tratwong; Phattana Thepmalaphansiri; Wiradech Kothny	Philippines; Edmon Velez; Edward Daliva; Gian Carlo Nocom; Walbert Mendoza	Brunei; Ak. Md Shah Al M. Azahari; Huzaimi Kassim; Khairul Quddus Roalee; Mohd Yunus Abdul Hamid
Team sabre	Thailand; Ekkathet Ket-iam; Kittikhun Tratwong; Phattana Thepmalaphansiri; Wiradech Kothny	Philippines; Edmon Velez; Edward Daliva; Gian Carlo Nocom; Walbert Mendoza	Vietnam; Dương Văn Cường; Nguyễn Lê Bá Quang; Nguyễn Văn Quế; Trần Văn Anh

=== Women ===
Event	Gold	Silver	Bronze
Individual épée	Michelle Bruzola; Philippines	Harlene Orendain; Philippines	Isnawaty Sir Idar; Indonesia
Individual épée	Michelle Bruzola; Philippines	Harlene Orendain; Philippines	Trần Thị Lén; Vietnam
Team épée	Thailand; Janjira Binsolam; Potchanee Samat; Siritida Choochokkul; Thatsaneephan Sivarawut	Indonesia; Dian Rahmayati; Enni Handayani; Nurul Musfira Amahoru; Isnawaty Sir Idar	Philippines; Harlene Orendain; Ma del Carmen Galvez; Mary Catherine Kong; Michelle Bruzola
Team épée	Thailand; Janjira Binsolam; Potchanee Samat; Siritida Choochokkul; Thatsaneephan Sivarawut	Indonesia; Dian Rahmayati; Enni Handayani; Nurul Musfira Amahoru; Isnawaty Sir Idar	Vietnam; Hạ Thị Sen; Nguyễn Thanh Vân; Nguyễn Thị Toan; Trần Thị Lén
Individual foil	Nunta Chantasuvannasin; Thailand	Fabiola Tirza Paulany Ratu; Indonesia	Michelle Mancenido; Philippines
Individual foil	Nunta Chantasuvannasin; Thailand	Fabiola Tirza Paulany Ratu; Indonesia	Veena Tessa Nuestro; Philippines
Team foil	Singapore; Ruth Ng Yi Lin; Serene Ser Xue Ling; Tay Yu Ling; Wang Wenying	Philippines; Ma Dinah Remolacio; Mia Allyson Howell; Michelle Mancenido; Veena Tessa Nuestro	Indonesia; Fabiola Tirza Paulany Ratu; Meylani Anita Lelemboto; Nova Mariana; Verdiana Rihandini
Team foil	Singapore; Ruth Ng Yi Lin; Serene Ser Xue Ling; Tay Yu Ling; Wang Wenying	Philippines; Ma Dinah Remolacio; Mia Allyson Howell; Michelle Mancenido; Veena Tessa Nuestro	Thailand; Darin Srisawat; Nanthip Pooriyapan; Nunta Chantasuvannasin; Tipsuda Buravatdeacha
Individual sabre	Nguyễn Thị Lệ Dung; Vietnam	Nona Lim Yean Hong; Singapore	Joanna Franquelli; Philippines
Individual sabre	Nguyễn Thị Lệ Dung; Vietnam	Nona Lim Yean Hong; Singapore	Sirawalai Starrat; Thailand
Team sabre	Vietnam; Nguyễn Thị Lệ Dung; Nguyễn Thị Thanh Loan; Nguyễn Thị Thuỷ Chung; Trịnh Thị Lý	Philippines; Joanna Franquelli; Lenita Otadoy; Ma Wendelyn Mendoza; Mary Rose Alfonso	Singapore; Ann Lee Huimin; Lewina Lee Yi Chen; Liesl Khoo Yi Min; Nona Lim Yean Hong
Team sabre	Vietnam; Nguyễn Thị Lệ Dung; Nguyễn Thị Thanh Loan; Nguyễn Thị Thuỷ Chung; Trịnh Thị Lý	Philippines; Joanna Franquelli; Lenita Otadoy; Ma Wendelyn Mendoza; Mary Rose Alfonso	Thailand; Alisa Chuansin; Sirawalai Starrat; Supanna Samaboot; Uraiporn Dankamon
