= Billiards and snooker at the 2007 SEA Games =

Billiards and Snooker at the 2007 SEA Games

The billiards and snooker events at the 2007 SEA Games were held at the Sima Thani Hotel Grand Ballroom, Nakhon Ratchasima from 7 December to 14 December. There were thirteen events in total, ten men's and three women's. Thailand was the most successful nation overall, winning five gold medals.

== Medal winners ==
The medal winners are listed below.

=== Men ===
Event	Gold	Silver	Bronze
6-red snooker singles	Phaitoon Phonbun; Thailand	Thepchaiya Un-Nooh; Thailand	Lim Chun Kiat; Singapore
Snooker singles	Moh Keen Ho; Malaysia	Noppadol Sangnil; Thailand	Atthasit Mahitthi; Thailand
Snooker doubles	Thailand; Atthasit Mahitthi; Phaitoon Phonbun	Malaysia; Moh Keen Ho; Yong Kein Foot	Philippines; Benjamin Guevarra, Jr. James Al Ortega
Snooker team	Thailand; Pramual Jantad; Phaitoon Phonbun; Noppadol Sangnil	Malaysia; Moh Loon Hong; Thor Chuan Leong; Yong Kein Foot	Singapore; Keith E Boon Aun; Peter Gilchrist; Lim Chun Kiat
English billiard singles	Praprut Chaithanasakun; Thailand	Thawat Sujaritthurakarn; Thailand	Nay Thway Oo; Myanmar
English billiard doubles	Myanmar; Kyaw Oo; Aung San Oo	Malaysia; Roslan Yurnalis; Moh Loon Hong	Thailand; Praprut Chaithanasakun; Thawat Sujaritthurakarn
8-ball pool singles	Ronato Alcano; Philippines	Tey Choon Kiat; Singapore	Ibrahim Amir; Malaysia
9-ball pool singles	Ricky Yang; Indonesia	Lee Vann Corteza; Philippines	Antonio Gabica; Philippines
9-ball pool doubles	Philippines; Antonio Gabica; Marlon Manalo	Singapore; Chan Keng Kwang; Toh Lian Han	Malaysia; Ibrahim Amir; Lee Poh Soon
One-cushion carom singles	Dương Anh Vũ; Vietnam	Nguyễn Sỹ Tường; Vietnam	Tan Kiong An; Indonesia

Results of the finals
Event	Winner(s)	Score	Runner(s)-up
6-red snooker singles	Phaitoon Phonbun; Thailand	5-3	Thepchaiya Un-Nooh; Thailand
Snooker singles	Moh Keen Ho; Malaysia	4-1	Noppadol Sangnil; Thailand
Snooker doubles	Thailand; Atthasit Mahitthi; Phaitoon Phonbun	3-2	Malaysia; Moh Keen Ho; Yong Kein Foot
Snooker team	Thailand; Pramual Jantad; Phaitoon Phonbun; Noppadol Sangnil	3-0	Malaysia; Moh Loon Hong; Thor Chuan Leong; Yong Kein Foot
English billiard singles	Praprut Chaithanasakun; Thailand	3-2	Thawat Sujaritthurakarn; Thailand
English billiard doubles	Myanmar; Kyaw Oo; Aung San Oo	3-0	Malaysia; Roslan Yurnalis; Moh Loon Hong
8-ball pool singles	Ronato Alcano; Philippines	9-6	Tey Choon Kiat; Singapore
9-ball pool singles	Ricky Yang; Indonesia	11-8	Lee Vann Corteza; Philippines
9-ball pool doubles	Philippines; Antonio Gabica; Marlon Manalo	11-6	Singapore; Chan Keng Kwang; Toh Lian Han
One-cushion carom singles	Dương Anh Vũ; Vietnam	100-89	Nguyễn Sỹ Tường; Vietnam

=== Women ===
Event	Gold	Silver	Bronze
6-red snooker singles	Santhinee Jaisuekul; Thailand	Mary Ann Basas; Philippines	Iris Ranola; Philippines
8-ball pool singles	Angeline Magdalena Ticoalu; Indonesia	Santhinee Jaisuekul; Thailand	Rubilen Amit; Philippines
9-ball pool singles	Rubilen Amit; Philippines	Angeline Magdalena Ticoalu; Indonesia	Santhinee Jaisuekul; Thailand

Results of the finals
Event	Winner(s)	Score	Runner(s)-up
6-red snooker singles	Santhinee Jaisuekul; Thailand	4-3	Mary Ann Basas; Philippines
8-ball pool singles	Angeline Magdalena Ticoalu; Indonesia	7-5	Santhinee Jaisuekul; Thailand
9-ball pool singles	Rubilen Amit; Philippines	7-5	Angeline Magdalena Ticoalu; Indonesia
