= Weightlifting at the 2013 SEA Games – Men's 77 kg =

The men's 77 kg event at the 2013 SEA Games took place on 14 December 2013 at Thein Phyu Stadium.

== Schedule ==
All times are Myanmar Standard Time (UTC+06:30)

Date	Time	Event
Saturday, 14 December 2013	16:00	Final

== Results ==
Rank	Athlete	Group	Body weight	Snatch (kg)				Clean & Jerk (kg)				Total
Rank	Athlete	Group	Body weight	1	2	3	Result	1	2	3	Result	Total
1st place, gold medalist(s)	Pornchai Lobsi (THA)	A	75.30	~~145~~	145	151	151	180	185	~~194~~	185	336
2nd place, silver medalist(s)	Ngoc Nguyen Hong (VIE)	A	76.50	133	138	~~141~~	138	170	179	181	181	319
3rd place, bronze medalist(s)	Edi Kurniawan (INA)	A	75.90	138	~~142~~	142	142	170	174	~~178~~	174	316
4	Sa Than Htike Win (MYA)	A	75.90	130	~~135~~	135	135	~~160~~	160	~~165~~	160	295
5	Mohammad Azril Huzairi Ramli (MAS)	A	71.45	127	132	~~134~~	132	~~157~~	157	161	161	293

== New records ==
The following records were established during the competition.

Snatch	151	Pornchai Lobsi (THA)	GR
