= Weightlifting at the 2007 SEA Games =

Weightlifting at the 2007 SEA Games was held in the College Assembly Hall, Nakhon Ratchasima Vocational College, Nakhon Ratchasima, Thailand

== Medal tally ==
* Host nation (Thailand)

Rank	Nation	Gold	Silver	Bronze	Total
1	Thailand*	7	5	1	13
2	Indonesia	5	3	1	9
3	Vietnam	1	3	3	7
4	Philippines	0	1	2	3
5	Malaysia	0	1	1	2
Totals (5 entries)		13	13	8	34

== Medalists ==
=== Men ===
Event	Gold	Silver	Bronze
56 kg	Eko Yuli Irawan; Indonesia	Hoàng Anh Tuấn; Vietnam	Pongsak Maneetong; Thailand
62 kg	Triyatno; Indonesia	Niwat Kritphet; Thailand	Naharudin Mahayudin; Malaysia
69 kg	Edi Kurniawan; Indonesia	Sitthisak Suphalak; Thailand	Nguyễn Hồng Ngọc; Vietnam
77 kg	Sandow Waldemar Nasution; Indonesia	Kraisorn Dadtuyawat; Thailand	none awarded
85 kg	Pitaya Tibnoke; Thailand	Rahman Hidayat; Indonesia	Nguyễn Quốc Hải; Vietnam
94 kg	Suthipon Watthanakasikam; Thailand	Renante Briones; Philippines	none awarded
105 kg	Khunchai Nuchpum; Thailand	Reynaldi Saenal; Indonesia	Richard Pep Agosto; Philippines
+105 kg	Niti Kameiam; Thailand	Brandon Nicholas K. Jalani; Malaysia	Dedi Aprianto; Indonesia

=== Women ===
Event	Gold	Silver	Bronze
53 kg	Suda Chaleephay; Thailand	Okta Dwi Pramita; Indonesia	none awarded
58 kg	Wandee Kameaim; Thailand	Nguyễn Thị Yến; Vietnam	Hidilyn Diaz; Philippines
63 kg	Nguyễn Thị Thiết; Vietnam	Sureerat Thongsuk; Thailand	none awarded
69 kg	Khanittha Petanang; Thailand	Khuất Minh Hải; Vietnam	none awarded
75 kg	Ni Luh Sinta Darmariani; Indonesia	Watcharawadee Rattanachuang; Thailand	Nguyễn Thị Phương Loan; Vietnam
