= Indonesia at the 2007 SEA Games =

Indonesia at the 2007 Southeast Asian Games
- IOC code: INA
- NOC: Indonesian Olympic Committee
- Website: www.nocindonesia.or.id (in English)

in Nakhon Ratchasima 6 - 15 December 2007
- Competitors: 574
- Flag bearer: Sugianto Setiawan (cycling)
- Medals Ranked 4th: Gold 56 Silver 64 Bronze 83 Total 203

Southeast Asian Games appearances (overview)
- 1977; 1979; 1981; 1983; 1985; 1987; 1989; 1991; 1993; 1995; 1997; 1999; 2001; 2003; 2005; 2007; 2009; 2011; 2013; 2015; 2017; 2019; 2021; 2023; 2025; 2027; 2029

Indonesia participated in the 2007 Southeast Asian Games in the city of Nakhon Ratchasima, Thailand from 6 December 2007 to 15 December 2007.

== Medal table ==
Sport	1st place, gold medalist(s)	2nd place, silver medalist(s)	3rd place, bronze medalist(s)	Total
Athletics	7	7	5	19
Badminton	7	2	2	11
Pencak Silat	5	3	4	12
Weightlifting	5	3	1	9
Cycling	5	2	4	11
Canoeing	4	5	3	12
Archery	3	5	1	9
Karate	2	4	8	14
Bowling	2	3	2	7
Rowing	2	2	1	5
Billiards and snooker	2	1	1	4
Volleyball	2	0	1	3
Judo	1	3	5	9
Tennis	1	3	3	7
Wrestling	1	2	2	5
Sailing	1	2	1	4
Diving	1	1	3	5
Bodybuilding	1	1	2	4
Taekwondo	1	1	1	3
Wushu	1	0	5	6
Gymnastics	1	0	3	4
Traditional boat race	1	0	2	3
Swimming	0	5	2	7
Sepak takraw	0	3	1	4
Fencing	0	2	4	6
Table Tennis	0	1	3	4
Basketball	0	1	0	1
Equestrian	0	1	0	1
Softball	0	1	0	1
Boxing	0	0	6	6
Golf	0	0	2	2
Shooting	0	0	2	2
Baseball	0	0	1	1
Football	0	0	1	1
Muay Thai	0	0	1	1
Water polo	0	0	1	1
Total	56	64	83	203
