= Golf at the 2007 SEA Games =

- Venue: Bonanza Golf and Country Club
- Dates: 10–13 December 2007
- Nations: 8

Golf at the 2007 SEA Games was held at the Bonanza Golf and Country Club in Nakhon Ratchasima Province, Thailand, from 10 to 13 December 2007.

Thailand won all four gold medals contested in the sport, winning the men's and women's individual events as well as both team events.

== Competition format ==
The men's competition was played over 72 holes with teams of four players, while the women's competition was played over 54 holes with teams of three players. In the team events, the worst score from each team was discarded in each round to determine the team total. Separate individual competitions were also held for men and women. Eight countries competed in the men's competition and five countries competed in the women's competition.

== Medal tally ==
* Host nation (Thailand)

| Rank | Nation | Gold | Silver | Bronze | Total |
|---|---|---|---|---|---|
| 1 | Thailand* | 4 | 1 | 0 | 5 |
| 2 | Philippines | 0 | 3 | 0 | 3 |
| 3 | Indonesia | 0 | 0 | 2 | 2 |
| 3 | Malaysia | 0 | 0 | 2 | 2 |
| Totals (4 entries) | | 4 | 4 | 4 | 12 |

== Medalists ==
| Event | Gold | Silver | Bronze |
|---|---|---|---|
| Men's individual | Pipatpong Naewsuk; Thailand | Kiradech Aphibarnrat; Thailand | Akhmal Tarmizee Mohd Nazari; Malaysia |
| Women's individual | Patcharajutar Kongkraphan; Thailand | Anya Tanpinco; Philippines | Ainil Johani Abu Bakar; Malaysia |
| Men's team | Thailand (THA); Kiradech Aphibarnrat; Pipatpong Naewsuk; Thanyakon Khrongpha; Varut Chomchalam | Philippines (PHI); Anthony Fernando; Ferdinand Aunzo; Jhonnel Ababa; Mhark Fernando | Indonesia (INA); Andik Mauludin; Hardjito; Suprapto; Yuniarto Bennita |
| Women's team | Thailand (THA); Patcharajutar Kongkraphan; Punpaka Phuntumabamrung; Yupaporn Kawinpakorn | Philippines (PHI); Chihiro Ikeda; Regina de Guzman; Anya Tanpinco | Indonesia (INA); Agnes Retno Sudjasmin; Juriah; Lidya Ivana Jaya |
