= Dancesport at the 2007 SEA Games =

DanceSport at the 2007 SEA Games
- Venue: Auditorium, Wongchawalitkul University
- Location: Amphoe Mueang Nakhon Ratchasima, Nakhon Ratchasima Province
- Start date: December 8, 2007
- End date: December 9, 2007

Dancesport was an event at the 2007 SEA Games. The competition took place in the Auditorium of the Wongchawalitkul University, Amphoe Mueang Nakhon Ratchasima, Nakhon Ratchasima Province, Thailand.

== Medal table ==
* Host nation (Thailand)

Rank	Nation	Gold	Silver	Bronze	Total
1	Thailand (THA)*	8	6	6	20
2	Philippines (PHI)	2	4	3	9
3	Malaysia (MAS)	0	0	1	1
Totals (3 entries)		10	10	10	30

== Medalists ==
=== Standard ===
Event	Gold	Silver	Bronze
Quickstep	Philippines (PHI); Emmanuel Reyes; Maira Rosete	Thailand (THA); Aphichai Promboon; Pakaorn Kuituan	Thailand (THA); Pawatpong Racha-apai; Thitiyapa Potimu
Slow Foxtrot	Thailand (THA); Thepporn Mokkuntod; Jaroonrat Sinjaroen	Philippines (PHI); Emmanuel Reyes; Maira Rosete	Thailand (THA); Thitiyapa Potimu; Pawatpong Racha-apai
Tango	Philippines (PHI); Emmanuel Reyes; Maira Rosete	Thailand (THA); Pawatpong Racha-apai; Thitiyapa Potimu	Thailand (THA); Aphichai Promboon; Pakaorn Kuituan
Viennese Waltz	Thailand (THA); Thepporn Mokkuntod; Jaroonrat Sinjaroen	Philippines (PHI); Emmanuel Reyes; Maira Rosete	Thailand (THA); Aphichai Promboon; Pakaorn Kuituan
Waltz	Thailand (THA); Thepporn Mokkuntod; Jaroonrat Sinjaroen	Thailand (THA); Pawatpong Racha-apai; Thitiyapa Potimu	Philippines (PHI); Emmanuel Reyes; Maira Rosete

=== Latin American ===
Event	Gold	Silver	Bronze
Cha Cha Cha	Thailand (THA); Watcharakorn Suasuebpun; Warapa Jumbala	Thailand (THA); Theerawut Thommuangpak; Phuthinat Khanitnusorn	Philippines (PHI); Reynato Rener Mercado; Judith Anne Melencio
Jive	Thailand (THA); Bandit Chaimuti; Nethathai Chaimuti	Philippines (PHI); John Erolle Melencio; Dearlie Gerodias	Thailand (THA); Theerawut Thommuangpak; Phuthinat Khanitnusorn
Paso Doble	Thailand (THA); Watcharakorn Suasuebpun; Warapa Jumbala	Philippines (PHI); John Erolle Melencio; Dearlie Gerodias	Thailand (THA); Bandit Chaimuti; Nethathai Chaimuti
Rumba	Thailand (THA); Watcharakorn Suasuebpun; Warapa Jumbala	Thailand (THA); Bandit Chaimuti; Nethathai Chaimuti	Malaysia (MAS); Yong Kwok Leong; Gooi Yee Zhen
Samba	Thailand (THA); Watcharakorn Suasuebpun; Warapa Jumbala	Thailand (THA); Theerawut Thommuangpak; Phuthinat Khanitnusorn	Philippines (PHI); John Erolle Melencio; Dearlie Gerodias
