= Ke Leng =

Cambodian pétanque athlete

Personal information
- Native name: កែ ឡេង
- Full name: Ke Leng
- Nationality: Cambodian
- Born: 1962 (age 63–64) Rolea B'ier, Kampong Chhnang, Cambodia
- Home town: Phnom Penh, Cambodia

Sport
- Country: Cambodia
- Sport: Pétanque
Medal record
Representing Cambodia
World Championships
Gold medal – first place	2013 Montauban	Precision Shooting
Gold medal – first place	2015 Bangkok	Precision Shooting
Gold medal – first place	2017 Kaihua	Precision Shooting
Gold medal – first place	2019 Phnom Penh	Precision Shooting
Asian Indoor Games
Bronze medal – third place	2009 Vietnam	Doubles
SEA Games
Gold medal – first place	2001 Malaysia	Shooting
Gold medal – first place	2013 Myanmar	Shooting
Gold medal – first place	2017 Malaysia	Doubles
Silver medal – second place	2003 Vietnam	Shooting
Silver medal – second place	2005 Philippines	Doubles
Silver medal – second place	2007 Thailand	Doubles
Bronze medal – third place	2005 Philippines	Triples
Bronze medal – third place	2009 Laos	Doubles
Bronze medal – third place	2011 Indonesia	Shooting
Bronze medal – third place	2015 Singapore	Shooting

Ke Leng (Khmer: កែ ឡេង) is a retired Cambodian pétanque player. She won four consecutive Women's Pétanque World Championships in the precision shooting category. She is widely considered one of the greatest Cambodian pétanque players and Cambodian athletes.

== Early life ==
Ke Leng was born in 1962 in Rolea B'ier, Kampong Chhnang province. She lived with her mother until 1980 when her mother died, she moved to Phnom Penh to live with her sister.

In 1982, she began to play volleyball for the Ministry of National Defence. During the time she played volleyball, she got a job at the Ministry until nowadays and got married. In 1997, the team was dissolved and she switched to boules.

== Career ==
In 1998, she registered for the national boules championships and after an amazing performance, she placed her name in the national teams alongside Ouk Sreymom. In 1999, she made her international debut at the 1999 Asian Petanque Championships in Singapore. Alongside her companions, they won the gold medal in the doubles event after winning against Thailand.

She made her SEA Games debut at the 2001 SEA Games and won a gold medal at the shooting event. A month later, she won a bronze medal at the 2001 Asian Petanque Championships held on her country's soil. She also won silver medals at the 2003 SEA Games, 2005 SEA Games and 2007 SEA Games. She also won bronze medals at the 2009 SEA Games, 2011 SEA Games and 2015 SEA Games.

At the 2013 SEA Games, 12 years after winning a gold medal in Malaysia, she won another one in Myanmar after winning against Thailand's Potjanaseni Pawinee, 36–16 in the final. Four years later, she returned to Malaysia and grabbed another gold medal in the doubles event.

At the 2009 Asian Indoor Games, Leng won a bronze medal with Sreymom in the women’s petanque doubles competition.

At the Pétanque World Championships, Leng participated in the precision shooting event. She won the 2013 championships held in Montauban, France, becoming the first Cambodian to win a gold medal at the world championships. Two years later in Bangkok, she won another gold medal after facing strong rival Mouna Beji of Tunisia in the final, which she won 33–24, securing her gold medal and her defense of the world championship in the process. At the 2017 events in Kaihua, she defended her title, winning Wongchuvej Phantipha of Thailand 43–38, and tied Angélique Colombet of France in gold medals. At the 2019 event which was held in Phnom Penh, Cambodia, Leng become the first player to win four consecutive titles after defeating her Lao counterpart Bivilak Thepphakan 36–22 at the National Olympic Stadium.

On 29 May 2020, Ke Leng announced her retirement, citing her health reason and her jobs at the Ministry of National Defence.
