= Squash at the 2007 SEA Games =

Squash at the 2007 Southeast Asian Games was held in the Ratchaphruek Club, North Park Golf and Sport Club in Bangkok, Thailand.

== Medal winners ==
Event	Gold	Silver	Bronze
Men's singles	Elvinn Keo Jinn Chung; Malaysia	Mohd Nafzahizam Adnan; Malaysia	Chatchawin Tangjaitrong; Thailand
Men's singles	Elvinn Keo Jinn Chung; Malaysia	Mohd Nafzahizam Adnan; Malaysia	Robert Andrew Garcia; Philippines
