= Brunei at the 2007 SEA Games =

Brunei at the 2007 Southeast Asian Games
- IOC code: BRU
- NOC: Brunei Darussalam National Olympic Council
- Website: www.bruneiolympic.org (in English)

in Nakhon Ratchasima
- Medals Ranked 10th: Gold 1 Silver 1 Bronze 4 Total 6

Southeast Asian Games appearances (overview)
- 1977; 1979; 1981; 1983; 1985; 1987; 1989; 1991; 1993; 1995; 1997; 1999; 2001; 2003; 2005; 2007; 2009; 2011; 2013; 2015; 2017; 2019; 2021; 2023; 2025; 2027; 2029

Brunei Darussalam participated in the 2007 Southeast Asian Games, held in the city of Nakhon Ratchasima, Thailand from December 6, 2007, to December 16, 2007.

== Medal table ==
Sport	Gold	Silver	Bronze	Total
Lawn bowls	1	0	1	2
Pencak silat	0	1	0	1
Athletics	0	0	1	1
Fencing	0	0	1	1
Karate	0	0	1	1
Total	1	1	4	6

== Medalists ==
Medal	Name	Sport	Event
Gold	Hj Naim Brahim	Lawn bowls	Men's singles
Silver	Haji Raya Norleyermay	Pencak silat	Women's tunggal
Bronze	Yusof Mohammad Yazid Yatimi	Athletics	Discus throw
Bronze	Brunei	Fencing	Men's team sabre
Bronze	HJ Johari	Karate	Women's kumite 48 kg
Bronze	Brunei	Lawn bowls	Men's pairs
