= Boxing at the 2007 SEA Games =

Boxing competitions

Boxing at the 2007 SEA Games were held in the Gymnasium in Municipality of Tambon Mueang Pak, Amphoe Pak Thong Chai, Nakhon Ratchasima Province, Thailand. The boxing schedule began on December 7 to December 13.

== Medal tally ==
* Host nation (Thailand)

Rank	Nation	Gold	Silver	Bronze	Total
1	Thailand*	16	1	0	17
2	Philippines	1	12	2	15
3	Malaysia	0	2	3	5
4	Vietnam	0	1	10	11
5	Laos	0	1	6	7
6	Indonesia	0	0	7	7
7	Myanmar	0	0	4	4
8	Cambodia	0	0	1	1
Totals (8 entries)		17	17	33	67

== Medalists ==
=== Men ===
Event	Gold	Silver	Bronze
Pinweight; 45 kg	Kaeo Pongprayoon; Thailand	Sikham Vongpakhoun; Laos	Marten Surati; Indonesia
Pinweight; 45 kg	Kaeo Pongprayoon; Thailand	Sikham Vongpakhoun; Laos	Bill Vicente Vicera; Philippines
Light flyweight 48 kg	Amnat Ruenroeng; Thailand	Zamzai Azizi Mohamad; Malaysia	Nhothin Holapatiphone; Laos
Light flyweight 48 kg	Amnat Ruenroeng; Thailand	Zamzai Azizi Mohamad; Malaysia	Albert Pabila; Philippines
Flyweight; 51 kg	Somjit Jongjohor; Thailand	Godfrey Castro; Philippines	Mohammad Ali Abdul Karim; Malaysia
Flyweight; 51 kg	Somjit Jongjohor; Thailand	Godfrey Castro; Philippines	Nguyễn Trọng Đạt; Vietnam
Bantamweight; 54 kg	Worapoj Petchkoom; Thailand	Junel Cantancio; Philippines	Xayyalack Chanthasone; Laos
Bantamweight; 54 kg	Worapoj Petchkoom; Thailand	Junel Cantancio; Philippines	Trần Quốc Việt; Vietnam
Featherweight; 57 kg	Sailom Adi; Thailand	Orlando Tacuyan, Jr. Philippines	Eddey Kalai; Malaysia
Featherweight; 57 kg	Sailom Adi; Thailand	Orlando Tacuyan, Jr. Philippines	Naung Soe Yan; Myanmar
Lightweight; 60 kg	Pichai Sayota; Thailand	Joegin Ladon; Philippines	Miftah Rifai Lubis; Indonesia
Lightweight; 60 kg	Pichai Sayota; Thailand	Joegin Ladon; Philippines	Paunandes Paulus; Malaysia
Light welterweight 64 kg	Manus Boonjumnong; Thailand	Larry Semillano; Philippines	Erico Amanupunyo; Indonesia
Light welterweight 64 kg	Manus Boonjumnong; Thailand	Larry Semillano; Philippines	Nanthalath Xaiyavong; Laos
Welterweight; 69 kg	Non Boonjumnong; Thailand	Mohamad Farkhan Haron; Malaysia	Cao Văn Trường; Vietnam
Welterweight; 69 kg	Non Boonjumnong; Thailand	Mohamad Farkhan Haron; Malaysia	Phet Vongthaphanh; Laos
Middleweight; 75 kg	Suriya Prasathinphimai; Thailand	Junie Tizon; Philippines	Hin Sai Heng; Cambodia
Middleweight; 75 kg	Suriya Prasathinphimai; Thailand	Junie Tizon; Philippines	Hứa Đức Trọng; Vietnam
Light heavyweight 81 kg	Angkhan Chomphuphuang; Thailand	Maximino Tabangcora; Philippines	Sisouphanh Lavilaiseng; Laos
Light heavyweight 81 kg	Angkhan Chomphuphuang; Thailand	Maximino Tabangcora; Philippines	Muhammad Yunus Pane; Indonesia

=== Women ===
Event	Gold	Silver	Bronze
Pinweight; 46 kg	Dueannapha Ngamlam; Thailand	Vũ Thị Hải Yến; Vietnam	Thin Kyu Kyu; Myanmar
Pinweight; 46 kg	Dueannapha Ngamlam; Thailand	Vũ Thị Hải Yến; Vietnam	Rotty Yunike Lenda; Indonesia
Light flyweight 48 kg	Sopida Satumrum; Thailand	Alice Kate Aparri; Philippines	Nguyễn Thị Hoa; Vietnam
Light flyweight 48 kg	Sopida Satumrum; Thailand	Alice Kate Aparri; Philippines	Rumiris Nursita Simarmata; Indonesia
Flyweight; 50 kg	Annie Albania; Philippines	Hansa Kadeewong; Thailand	Ei Swe Hninn; Myanmar
Flyweight; 50 kg	Annie Albania; Philippines	Hansa Kadeewong; Thailand	Nguyễn Thị Chiến; Vietnam
Light bantamweight 52 kg	Usanakorn Thawilsuhannawang; Thailand	Annalisa Cruz; Philippines	Yunike Abigael Busira; Indonesia
Light bantamweight 52 kg	Usanakorn Thawilsuhannawang; Thailand	Annalisa Cruz; Philippines	Lê Thị Ngân Hằng; Vietnam
Bantamweight; 54 kg	Tassamalee Thongjan; Thailand	Jouveliet Chilem; Philippines	Đinh Thị Phương Thanh; Vietnam
Bantamweight; 54 kg	Tassamalee Thongjan; Thailand	Jouveliet Chilem; Philippines	Mo Mo Naing Hninn; Myanmar
Featherweight; 57 kg	Peamwilai Laopeam; Thailand	Ronijen Sofla; Philippines	Ngô Thị Chung; Vietnam
Lightweight; 60 kg	Sumittra Ngoksungnoen; Thailand	Mitchel Martinez; Philippines	Lê Thị Hiền; Vietnam
Lightweight; 60 kg	Sumittra Ngoksungnoen; Thailand	Mitchel Martinez; Philippines	Manivone Phimsomphon; Laos

Preceded by 2005	Boxing at the SEA Games; 2007 SEA Games	Succeeded by 2009
