= Wrestling at the 2007 SEA Games =

Wrestling at the 2007 SEA Games was held at the gymnasium in Rajamangala University of Technology Isan, Nakhon Ratchasima, Thailand

== Medal tally ==
* Host nation (Thailand)

| Rank | Nation | Gold | Silver | Bronze | Total |
|---|---|---|---|---|---|
| 1 | Vietnam | 8 | 0 | 0 | 8 |
| 2 | Indonesia | 1 | 2 | 2 | 5 |
| 3 | Philippines | 0 | 4 | 4 | 8 |
| 4 | Thailand* | 0 | 3 | 2 | 5 |
| 5 | Cambodia | 0 | 0 | 3 | 3 |
| 6 | Laos | 0 | 0 | 2 | 2 |
| Totals (6 entries) | | 9 | 9 | 13 | 31 |

== Medalists ==
=== Men's freestyle ===
| Event | Gold | Silver | Bronze |
|---|---|---|---|
| 55 kg | Phạm Đức Khang; Vietnam | Ricky Fajar Adi Saputra; Indonesia | Margarito Angana; Philippines |
| 55 kg | Phạm Đức Khang; Vietnam | Ricky Fajar Adi Saputra; Indonesia | Weerapol Cottham; Thailand |
| 60 kg | Bùi Tuấn Anh; Vietnam | Erikson Tambunan; Indonesia | Roque Mana-Ay, Jr. Philippines |
| 60 kg | Bùi Tuấn Anh; Vietnam | Erikson Tambunan; Indonesia | Vilnkone Vongphachanh; Laos |
| 66 kg | Nguyễn Doãn Dũng; Vietnam | Jimmy Angana; Philippines | Chab Loeun; Cambodia |
| 66 kg | Nguyễn Doãn Dũng; Vietnam | Jimmy Angana; Philippines | Shandi Rhomadon; Indonesia |
| 74 kg | Fahriansyah; Indonesia | Alven Aragon; Philippines | Dorn Saov; Cambodia |
| 74 kg | Fahriansyah; Indonesia | Alven Aragon; Philippines | Khonkeo Thatthavong; Laos |
| 84 kg | Mẫn Bá Xuân; Vietnam | Marcus Valda; Philippines | Lotus Malino Sembiring; Indonesia |

=== Women's freestyle ===
| Event | Gold | Silver | Bronze |
|---|---|---|---|
| 48 kg | Đặng Thị Vân; Vietnam | Sunisa Klahan; Thailand | Maribel Jambora; Philippines |
| 51 kg | Phạm Thị Huế; Vietnam | Wilaiwan Thongkam; Thailand | Maria Cristina Vergara; Philippines |
| 55 kg | Nghiêm Thị Giang; Vietnam | Anchuli Srithanyarat; Thailand | Try Sothavy; Cambodia |
| 59 kg | Lương Thị Quyên; Vietnam | Gemma Silverio; Philippines | Kwanta Uraipan; Thailand |
