= Sepak takraw at the 2007 SEA Games =

Sepak Takraw at the 2007 SEA Games was held in the MCC Hall in The Mall Department Store in Nakhon Ratchasima, Thailand.

Powerhouse Malaysia withdrew their team just days before the commencement of the competition in protest against the use of a rubber-coated ball rather than the traditional rattan ball.

== Medal table ==
* Host nation (Thailand)

Rank	Nation	Gold	Silver	Bronze	Total
1	Thailand (THA)*	8	0	0	8
2	Vietnam (VIE)	0	3	3	6
3	Indonesia (INA)	0	3	1	4
4	Myanmar (MYA)	0	2	4	6
5	Philippines (PHI)	0	0	4	4
6	Laos (LAO)	0	0	3	3
Totals (6 entries)		8	8	15	31

== Medalists ==
=== Men ===
Event	Gold	Silver	Bronze
Doubles	Thailand; Anuwat Chaichana; Purich Pansila; Rawat Parbchompoo	Indonesia; Suko Hartono; Yudi Purnomo; Husni Uba	Laos; Thittavanh Bounpaseuth; Phongeun Khogmany; Champiane Somsamaivong
Doubles	Thailand; Anuwat Chaichana; Purich Pansila; Rawat Parbchompoo	Indonesia; Suko Hartono; Yudi Purnomo; Husni Uba	Myanmar; Lat Zaw; Soe Oaka; Thiha Oo Kyaw
Regu	Thailand; Pornchai Kaokaew; Suriyan Paechan; Suebsak Phunsueb; Singha Somsakul; Niphat Wongprasoet	Indonesia; Eko Kusdiyanto; Nasrum Muhammad; Yudi Purnomo; Edy Suwarno; Husni Uba	Myanmar; Lat Zaw; Myo Swe Aung; Ose Oaka; Thiha Oo Kyaw; Zaw Zaw Aung
Regu	Thailand; Pornchai Kaokaew; Suriyan Paechan; Suebsak Phunsueb; Singha Somsakul; Niphat Wongprasoet	Indonesia; Eko Kusdiyanto; Nasrum Muhammad; Yudi Purnomo; Edy Suwarno; Husni Uba	Vietnam; Do Trung Hieu; Le Tien Dung; Nguyen Trong Thuy; Tran Quang Khai; Trinh Dinh Kien
Hoop	Thailand; Wattana Jaiyan; Ekachai Masuk; Saharat Ounumpai; Prasert Pongpung; Chaiya Wattano; Thanaiwat Yoosuk	Myanmar; Aung Hlaing Moe; Aung Zaw; Maung Maung Sein; Than Zaw Oo; Thein Zaw Min; Zaw Zaw Aung	Indonesia; Samsul Hadi; Suko Hartono; Eko Kusdiyanto; Hadi Mulyono; Edy Suwarno; Dwi Wisnu
Hoop	Thailand; Wattana Jaiyan; Ekachai Masuk; Saharat Ounumpai; Prasert Pongpung; Chaiya Wattano; Thanaiwat Yoosuk	Myanmar; Aung Hlaing Moe; Aung Zaw; Maung Maung Sein; Than Zaw Oo; Thein Zaw Min; Zaw Zaw Aung	Philippines; Danilo Alipan; Joel Carbonilla; Harrison Castanares; Hector Memarion; Jerome Santiago; Metodio Suico, Jr.
Team	Thailand; Panomporn Aiemsa-ard; Anuwat Chaichana; Somporn Jaisinghol; Kriangkrai Kaewmian; Pornchai Kaokaew; Suriyan Paechan; Rawat Parbchompoo; Suebsak Phunsueb; Prasert Pongpung; Singha Somsakul; Worapot Thongsai; Niphat Wongprasoet	Indonesia; Samsul Hadi; Suko Hartono; Eko Kusdiyanto; Saiful Majid; Nasrum Muhammad; Hadi Mulyono; Yudi Purnomo; Stephanus Sampe; Abrian Sihab Aldilatama; Edy Suwarno; Husni Uba; Dwi Wisnu	Laos; Thittavanh Bounpaseuth; Sovat Chanthavona; Chitmanoxai; Phonephisit Inthilat; Viengphet Keomanivong; Phongeun Khonmany; Sayamang Kongchantha; Champiane Somamaving; Soutthisone Thommanivong; Chanmay Thongin; Daovi Xanavongsai; Khamla Xayavongsy
Team	Thailand; Panomporn Aiemsa-ard; Anuwat Chaichana; Somporn Jaisinghol; Kriangkrai Kaewmian; Pornchai Kaokaew; Suriyan Paechan; Rawat Parbchompoo; Suebsak Phunsueb; Prasert Pongpung; Singha Somsakul; Worapot Thongsai; Niphat Wongprasoet	Indonesia; Samsul Hadi; Suko Hartono; Eko Kusdiyanto; Saiful Majid; Nasrum Muhammad; Hadi Mulyono; Yudi Purnomo; Stephanus Sampe; Abrian Sihab Aldilatama; Edy Suwarno; Husni Uba; Dwi Wisnu	Vietnam; Dinh Quang Tuan; Do Trung Hieu; Duong Hoai Tam; Le Tien Dung; Le Van Manh; Lieu Ba Tung; Luu Vinh Loi; Nguyen Trong Thuy; Nguyen Xuan Tung; Phan Tien Dung; Tran Quang Khai; Trinh Dinh Kien

=== Women ===
Event	Gold	Silver	Bronze
Doubles	Thailand; Waree Nantasing; Sirinapa Pornnongsan; Payom Srihongsa	Vietnam; Lê Thị Hạnh; Nguyễn Đức Thu Hiền; Nguyễn Hải Thảo	Myanmar; Aye Maw Khin; Kyu Kyu Thin; May Zin Phyoe
Doubles	Thailand; Waree Nantasing; Sirinapa Pornnongsan; Payom Srihongsa	Vietnam; Lê Thị Hạnh; Nguyễn Đức Thu Hiền; Nguyễn Hải Thảo	Philippines; Irene Apdon; Deseree Autor; Sarah Jane Catain
Regu	Thailand; Tidawan Daosakul; Nitinadda Kaewkamsai; Sunthari Rupsung; Areerat Takan; Nisa Thanaattawut	Vietnam; Nguyễn Bạch Vân; Nguyễn Hải Thảo; Nguyễn Thị Bích Thủy; Nguyễn Thị Hoa; Nguyễn Thịnh Thu Ba	Myanmar; Aye Maw Khin; Kyu Kyu Thin; May Zin Phyoe; Naing Naing Win; Thin Zar Ei
Regu	Thailand; Tidawan Daosakul; Nitinadda Kaewkamsai; Sunthari Rupsung; Areerat Takan; Nisa Thanaattawut	Vietnam; Nguyễn Bạch Vân; Nguyễn Hải Thảo; Nguyễn Thị Bích Thủy; Nguyễn Thị Hoa; Nguyễn Thịnh Thu Ba	Philippines; Irene Apdon; Deseree Autor; Gelyn Evora; Josefina Maat; Rhea Padrigo
Hoop	Thailand; Chotika Boonthong; Kobkul Chinchaiyaphum; Jiraporn Choochuen; Sahattiya Faksra; Viparat Ruanrat; Kantinan Sochaiyan	Myanmar; Kyu Kyu Thin; May Zin Phyoe; Naing Naing Win; Nwe Nwe Htway; Phyu Phyu Than; Su Tinzar Naing	Philippines; Irene Apdon; Deseree Autor; Sarah Jane Catain; Gelyn Evora; Josefina Maat; Rhea Padrigo
Hoop	Thailand; Chotika Boonthong; Kobkul Chinchaiyaphum; Jiraporn Choochuen; Sahattiya Faksra; Viparat Ruanrat; Kantinan Sochaiyan	Myanmar; Kyu Kyu Thin; May Zin Phyoe; Naing Naing Win; Nwe Nwe Htway; Phyu Phyu Than; Su Tinzar Naing	Vietnam; Cao Thị Yến; Đỗ Thị Thu Hiền; Nguyễn Thái Linh; Nguyễn Thị Bắc; Nguyễn Thị Hoa; Nguyễn Thị Minh Trang
Team	Thailand; Chotika Boonthong; Tidawan Daosakul; Nitinadda Kaewkamsai; Waree Nantasing; Sirinapa Pornnongsan; Kaewjai Pumsawangkaew; Sunthari Rupsung; Payom Srihongsa; Areerat Takan; Kanjana Thana; Nisa Thanaattawut; Prøsper çell Daranee Wongcharern	Vietnam; Lại Thị Huyền Trang; Lê Thị Hạnh; Nguyễn Bạch Vân; Nguyễn Đức Thu Hiền; Nguyễn Hải Thảo; Nguyễn Thị Bích Thủy; Nguyễn Thị Diễm Kiều; Nguyễn Thị Hoa; Nguyễn Thị Thúy An; Nguyễn Thịnh Thu Ba; Thạch Thị Mỹ Linh; Trương Thị Vân	Laos; Mitananh Bounpaseath; Khampha Chaleunsy; Philavanh Chanthasili; Chanlakhone Inthavongsa; Valinna Keomanivong; Malee Matmanivong; Pathoumphone Phommachanh; Manivanh Saixon; Bounlai Silivanh; Noly Xamounty; Bangon Xayalath; Koy Xayavong
