= Basketball at the 2007 SEA Games =

16th SEA Games Basketball Tournament
- Nakhon Ratchasima 2007

Tournament details
- SEA Games: 2007 SEA Games
- Host nation: Thailand
- City: Nakhon Ratchasima
- Venue: Keelapirom Stadium
- Duration: 7–13 December 2007

Men's tournament
- Teams: 5
Medals
Gold medalists	Philippines
Silver medalists	Indonesia
Bronze medalists	Malaysia

Women's tournament
- Teams: 4
Medals
Gold medalists	Malaysia
Silver medalists	Thailand
Bronze medalists	Philippines

Tournaments
← Ho Chi Minh City 2003	Jakarta 2011 →

The 2007 SEA Games basketball tournaments was held at Keelapirom Stadium, Suranaree University of Technology at Nakhon Ratchasima, Thailand.

The basketball events were not held on the 2005 SEA Games since the host country, the Philippines basketball federation (the Basketball Association of the Philippines) was suspended by the International Basketball Federation (FIBA). The suspension was lifted in 2006 and the Philippines and Malaysia defended their men's and women's championships, respectively, last won in 2003.

The tournament was conducted on a single round robin; the team with best record wins the gold.

The men's team of the Philippines maintained their superiority in the SEA Games, winning all of their games with an average lead of 42 points; the women's team of Malaysia easily dispatched their opponents in the first two games before upending the Thais in overtime to successfully defend their gold.

== Men's tournament ==
=== Participating nations ===
- Cambodia
- Indonesia
- Malaysia
- Philippines
- Thailand

=== Results ===
Pos	Team	Pld	W	L	PF	PA	PD	Pts	Final Result
1	Philippines	4	4	0	413	244	+169	8	Gold medal
2	Indonesia	4	3	1	284	252	+32	7	Silver medal
3	Malaysia	4	2	2	288	315	−27	6	Bronze medal
4	Thailand (H)	4	1	3	244	282	−38	5	
5	Cambodia	4	0	4	262	398	−136	4	

Rules for classification: (1) Tournament points, (2) Head-to-head tournament points, (3) Head-to-head goal average, (4) Overall goal average, (5) Drawing of lots
(H) Hosts

Times given below are in Time in Thailand (UTC+7).

December 7
3:00 p.m.

Cambodia	82–136	Philippines
Scoring by quarter: 16-33, 10-37, 28-36, 28-30

Keelapirom Stadium, Nakhon Ratchasima

December 7
5:00 p.m.

Malaysia	55–70	Indonesia
Scoring by quarter: 18-14, 12-11, 17-22, 8-23

Keelapirom Stadium, Nakhon Ratchasima

December 8
5:00 p.m.

Malaysia	70–65	Thailand
Scoring by quarter: 22-21, 23-17, 12-9, 13-18

Keelapirom Stadium, Nakhon Ratchasima

December 9
3:00 p.m.

Indonesia	49–75	Philippines
Scoring by quarter: 18-23, 6-23, 6-17, 17-12

Keelapirom Stadium, Nakhon Ratchasima

December 10
3:00 p.m.

Malaysia	103–72	Cambodia
Scoring by quarter: 29-13, 29-21, 28-12, 17-26

Keelapirom Stadium, Nakhon Ratchasima

December 10
5:00 p.m.

Thailand	65–67	Indonesia
Scoring by quarter: 28-20, 8-12, 15-17, 16-18

Keelapirom Stadium, Nakhon Ratchasima

December 11
5:00 p.m.

Cambodia	51–61	Thailand

Keelapirom Stadium, Nakhon Ratchasima

December 12
3:00 p.m.

Indonesia	98–57	Cambodia
Scoring by quarter: 28-14, 30-9, 19-10, 21-24

Keelapirom Stadium, Nakhon Ratchasima

December 12
5:00 p.m.

Philippines	108–60	Malaysia
Scoring by quarter: 33-14, 22-16, 31-11, 22-17

Keelapirom Stadium, Nakhon Ratchasima

December 13
3:00 p.m.

Thailand	53–94	Philippines
Scoring by quarter: 14-25, 14-15, 12-25, 13-29

Keelapirom Stadium, Nakhon Ratchasima

== Women's tournament ==
=== Participating nations ===
- Malaysia
- Philippines
- Singapore
- Thailand
- Indonesia – withdrew

=== Results ===
Pos	Team	Pld	W	L	PF	PA	PD	Pts	Final Result
1	Malaysia	3	3	0	195	159	+36	6	Gold medal
2	Thailand (H)	3	2	1	210	162	+48	5	Silver medal
3	Philippines	3	1	2	177	199	−22	4	Bronze medal
4	Singapore	3	0	3	145	207	−62	3	

Rules for classification: (1) Tournament points, (2) Head-to-head tournament points, (3) Head-to-head goal average, (4) Overall goal average, (5) Drawing of lots
(H) Hosts

Times given below are in Time in Thailand (UTC+7).

December 8
3:00 p.m.

Singapore	55–67	Philippines
Scoring by quarter: 13-24, 16-12, 9-17, 17-14

Keelapirom Stadium, Nakhon Ratchasima

This game was supposedly to be held on December 9 but host Thailand switched the game schedule placing the Philippines-Thailand game on December 9.

December 9
5:00 p.m.

Philippines	54–70	Thailand
Scoring by quarter: 18-15, 14-14, 4-21, 18-20

Keelapirom Stadium, Nakhon Ratchasima

This game was supposedly to be held on December 8 but host Thailand switched the game schedule placing the Philippines-Singapore game on December 8.

December 10
1:00 p.m.

Malaysia	60–43	Singapore
Scoring by quarter: 15-10, 25-11, 8-10, 12-12

Keelapirom Stadium, Nakhon Ratchasima

December 11
3:00 p.m.

Singapore	47–80	Thailand
Scoring by quarter: 14-21, 10-25, 6-19, 17-15

Keelapirom Stadium, Nakhon Ratchasima

December 12
1:00 p.m.

Philippines	56–74	Malaysia
Scoring by quarter: 10-19, 13-19, 16-14, 17-22

Keelapirom Stadium, Nakhon Ratchasima

December 13
5:00 p.m.

Thailand	60–61 (OT)	Malaysia
Scoring by quarter: 13-16, 18-11, 9-11, 15-17, Overtime: 5-6

Keelapirom Stadium, Nakhon Ratchasima

== Medal summary ==
=== Medal tally ===
Rank	Nation	Gold	Silver	Bronze	Total
1	Malaysia	1	0	1	2
1	Philippines	1	0	1	2
3	Indonesia	0	1	0	1
3	Thailand	0	1	0	1
Totals (4 entries)		2	2	2	6

=== Medalists ===
Event	Gold	Silver	Bronze
Men	Philippines (PHI); Chad Alonzo; Boyet Bautista; Beau Belga; Jeff Chan; Jervy Cruz; Jonathan Fernandez; Gabe Norwood; Frederic Rodriguez; Allan Salangsang; Eugene Tan; Al Vergara; Jayson Castro	Indonesia (INA); Raka Cokorda; Andrie Ekayana; Rony Gunawan; Faisal Julius Achmad; Andi Poedjakesuma; Amin Prihantono; Welyanson Situmorang; Youbel Sondakh; Andre Tiara; Wahyu Widayat Jati; Mario Wuysang	Malaysia (MAS); Ang Tun Kaw; Chee Li Wei; Cheong Yow Keen; Chow Kin Hoong; Koh Way Tek; Koo Chen Jye; Satyaseelan Kuppusamy; Lau Bik Ing; Loh Hoo Won; Abdul Kote Yusoff; Soo Eng Heng; Tan Kian Hoong
Women	Malaysia (MAS); Beh Siew Lian; Chan Ying Chee; Chow Sion Foong; Goh Beng Fong; Hee Shook Ying; Kew Suik May; Lee Siew Fun; Low Bee Chuan; Pee Yann Yann; Teo Woon Yuen; Thoh Chai Ling; Yong Shin Min	Thailand (THA); Naruemol Banmoo; Nantana Charoenrat; Chonticha Chirdpetcharat; Chonlada Eiamsum-Ang; Juthamas Jantakan; Supane Ludrodkij; Junthathip Mathuros; Roong-Aroon Pungkoksoong; Wipaporn Saechua; Charothai Suksomwong; Chanonnan Tunsaw; Penphan Yothanan	Philippines (PHI); Aurora Adriano; Victoria Lynne Brick; Joan Grajales; Amira Issa; Melissa Jacob; Diana Rose Jose; Machiko Matsuno; Minerva Narciza; Cassandra Noel Tioseco; Fatima Tolentino; Sylvia Marie Valencia; Emelia Vega

== See also ==
- Basketball at the SEA Games
- Southeast Asian Championships 2007

Preceded by 2003 (not held on 2005)	Basketball at the SEA Games; 2007 SEA Games	Succeeded by 2009
