= Philippines at the 2007 SEA Games =

Philippines at the 2007 Southeast Asian Games
- IOC code: PHI
- NOC: Philippine Olympic Committee
- Website: www.olympic.ph (in English)

in Nakhon Ratchasima
- Competitors: 620
- Flag bearer: John Baylon (Judo)
- Medals Ranked 6th: Gold 41 Silver 91 Bronze 96 Total 228

Southeast Asian Games appearances (overview)
- 1977; 1979; 1981; 1983; 1985; 1987; 1989; 1991; 1993; 1995; 1997; 1999; 2001; 2003; 2005; 2007; 2009; 2011; 2013; 2015; 2017; 2019; 2021; 2023; 2025; 2027; 2029

The Philippines had participated in the 24th Southeast Asian Games was held in the city of Nakhon Ratchasima from 6 to 15 December 2007. The country has a delegation of 620 athletes, who participated in 41 different events.

The delegation was placed 6th overall, the lowest windup of the country in the history of SEA Games since its entry in 1977. However, 4-time swimming gold medallist Miguel Molina was named the Most Valuable Male Player of the 2007 SEA Games, the third Filipino (and also the third Filipino swimmer) to bag the major award for outstanding SEA Games performance after Akiko Thomson in 1989 Kuala Lumpur Games and Eric Buhain in the 1991 Manila Games.

== Medalists ==
=== Gold ===
No.	Medal	Name	Sport	Event
1	Gold	Amaya Paz	Archery	Women's individual compound
2	Gold	Amaya Paz; Jennifer Chan; Abbigail Tindugan	Archery	Women's team
3	Gold	Julius Felicisimo Nierras	Athletics	Men's 400m
4	Gold	Rene Herrera	Athletics	Men's 3000m Steeplechase
5	Gold	Henry Dagmil	Athletics	Men's long jump
6	Gold	Arniel Ferrera	Athletics	Men's hammer throw
7	Gold	Marestella Torres	Athletics	Women's long jump
8	Gold	Richard Alonzo; Boyet Bautista; Beau Belga; Jeff Chan; Jervy Cruz; Jonathan Fernandez; Gabriel Norwood; Frederic Rodriguez; Allan Salangsang; Eugene Tan; Al Vergara; Jayson Castro	Basketball	Men's team
9	Gold	Ronato Alcano	Billiards	Men's 8-Ball Pool Singles
10	Gold	Antonio Gabica; Marlon Manalo	Billiards	Men's 9-Ball Pool Doubles
11	Gold	Rubilen Amit	Billiards	Women's 9-Ball Pool Singles
12	Gold	Annie Albania	Boxing	Women's Flyweight 50kg
13	Gold	Joey Barba	Cycling	Men's Mountain Biking Downhill
14	Gold	Baby Marites Bitbit	Cycling	Women's road race
15	Gold	Alfie Catalan	Cycling	Men's Track Pursuit
16	Gold	Victor Espiritu	Cycling	Men's Point Race
17	Gold	Emmanuel Reyes; Maira Rosete	Dancesport	Standard Quickstep
18	Gold	Emmanuel Reyes; Maira Rosete	Dancesport	Standard Tango
19	Gold	Rexel Ryan Fabriga; Jaime Asok	Diving	Men's 10m Synchronized Platform
20	Gold	Sheila Mae Pérez	Diving	Women's 3m springboard
21	Gold	Almario Vizcayno; Armando Bernal; Avelino Victorino Jr. Wilfredo Vizcayno Jr.	Fencing	Men's team Epee
22	Gold	Emerson Segui	Fencing	Men's individual Foil
23	Gold	Michelle Bruzola	Fencing	Women's individual Epee
24	Gold	John Baylon	Judo	Men's -81kg
25	Gold	Jose Rodriguez; Benjamin Tolentino Jr.	Rowing	Men's double sculls
26	Gold	Benjamin Tolentino Jr.	Rowing	Men's Lightweight Single Sculls
27	Gold	Anthony Santos; Apolonio Rosales; Ben Maravilles; Dario Bacarisas; Edzel Bacarisas; Isidro Abello; Jasper Cabrera; Joseph Roldan Bacarisas; Manuel Bacarisas Jr. Manuel Binarao; Mark Rae Ramirez; Marlon Pagkaliwagan; Melvin Villegas; Orlando Binarao; Oscar Bradshaw IV; Rogelio Rojas Jr. Victorio Enriquez Jr.	Softball	Men's team
28	Gold	Belen Asok; Cloiene Muyco; Dione Macasu; Elaine Bacarisas; Emily Tayag; Esmeralda Tayag; Gedda Valencia; Janet Vallite; Karina Aribal; Luvelyn Maganda; Mary Joy Lasquite; Nelsa Delagante; Nimpa Baral; Sarah Jane Agravante; Sheirylou Valenzuela; Syrel Ramos; Yocel Aguilar	Softball	Women's team
29	Gold	Daniel Coakley	Swimming	Men's 50m freestyle
30	Gold	Ryan Arabejo	Swimming	Men's 1500m freestyle
31	Gold	Ryan Arabejo	Swimming	Men's 200m backstroke
32	Gold	Miguel Molina	Swimming	Men's 200m breaststroke
33	Gold	James Walsh	Swimming	Men's 200m butterfly
34	Gold	Miguel Molina	Swimming	Men's 200m individual medley
35	Gold	Miguel Molina	Swimming	Men's 400m individual medley
36	Gold	Miguel Molina; Daniel Coakley; James Walsh; Ryan Arabejo	Swimming	Men's 4x100m medley relay
37	Gold	Tshomlee Go	Taekwondo	Men's Featherweight -67kg
38	Gold	Cecil Mamiit	Tennis	Men's singles
39	Gold	Ryan Mendoza	Triathlon	Men's Duathlon
40	Gold	Willy Wang	Wushu	Men's taolu Nanquan
41	Gold	Mariane Mariano	Wushu	Women's sanda 60kg

=== Silver ===
No.	Medal	Name	Sport	Event
1	Silver	Earl Benjamin Yap	Archery	Men's individual compound
2	Silver	Midel Dique	Athletics	Men's 800m
3	Silver	Julius Sermona	Athletics	Men's 5000m
4	Silver	Julius Sermona	Athletics	Men's 10000m
5	Silver	Danilo Fresnido	Athletics	Men's javelin throw
6	Silver	Mary Grace Melgar	Athletics	Women's 400m hurdles
7	Silver	Deborah Samson	Athletics	Women's pole vault
8	Silver	Rosie Villarito	Athletics	Women's javelin throw
9	Silver	Alejandro Velasquez; Andro Cuyugan; Charlie Labrador; Christian Canlas; Christopher Jimenez; Drawin dela Calzada; Edmer del Socorro; Erneste Binarao; Ferdinand Recto; Jon-Jon Robles; Jonash Ponce; Joseph Orillana; Junnifer Pinero; Nino Tator; Roel Empacis; Rommel Roja; Roy Baclay; Ruel Batuto; Ruen Angeles; Rulgencio Rances Jr. Virgilio Roxas; Wilfredo Hidalgo Jr.	Baseball	Men's team
10	Silver	Lee Vann Corteza	Billiards	Men's 9-Ball Pool Singles
11	Silver	Mary Ann Basas	Billiards	Women's 6-Red Snooker Singles
12	Silver	Godfrey Castro	Boxing	Men's Flyweight 51kg
13	Silver	Junel Cantancio	Boxing	Men's Bantamweight 54kg
14	Silver	Orlando Tacuyan Jr.	Boxing	Men's Featherweight 57kg
15	Silver	Joegin Ladon	Boxing	Men's Lightweight 60kg
16	Silver	Larry Semillano	Boxing	Men's Light Welterweight 64kg
17	Silver	Junie Tizon	Boxing	Men's Middleweight 75kg
18	Silver	Maximino Tabangcora	Boxing	Men's Light Heavyweight 81kg
19	Silver	Alice Kate Aparri	Boxing	Women's light flyweight 48kg
20	Silver	Annalisa Cruz	Boxing	Women's Light Bantamweight 52kg
21	Silver	Jouveliet Chilem	Boxing	Women's Bantamweight 54kg
22	Silver	Ronijen Sofia	Boxing	Women's Featherweight 57kg
23	Silver	Mitchel Martinez	Boxing	Women's Lightweight 60kg
24	Silver	Engelberto Rivera; Maria Iza del Rosario	Bowling	Mixed doubles
25	Silver	Eusebio Quinones	Cycling	Men's cross country
26	Silver	Emmanuel Reyes; Maira Rosete	Dancesport	Standard Slow Foxtrot
27	Silver	Emmanuel Reyes; Maira Rosete	Dancesport	Standard Viennese Waltz
28	Silver	John Erolle Melencio; Dearlie Gerodias	Dancesport	Latin America Jive
29	Silver	John Erolle Melencio; Dearlie Gerodias	Dancesport	Latin America Paso Doble
30	Silver	Zardo Domenios	Diving	Men's 1m springboard
31	Silver	Rexel Ryan Fabriga	Diving	Men's 10m platform
32	Silver	Zardo Domenios; Niño Carog	Diving	Men's 3m Synchronized Springboard
33	Silver	Sheila Mae Pérez	Diving	Women's 1m springboard
34	Silver	Diego Lorenzo	Equestrian	Individual show jumping
35	Silver	Emerson Segui; Mark Denver Atienza; Ramil Endriano; Rolando Canlas Jr.	Fencing	Men's team Foil
36	Silver	Walbert Mendoza	Fencing	Men's individual Sabre
37	Silver	Edmon Velez; Edward Daliva; Gian Carlo Nocom; Walbert Mendoza	Fencing	Men's team sabre
38	Silver	Herlene Orendain	Fencing	Women's individual Epee
39	Silver	Ma. Dinah Remolacio; Mia Allyson Howell; Michelle Mancenido; Veena Tessa Nuestro	Fencing	Women's team Foil
40	Silver	Joanna Franquelli; Lenita Otadoy; Ma. Wendelyn Mendoza; Mary Rose Alfonso	Fencing	Women's team sabre
41	Silver	Anya Tanpinco	Golf	Women's individual
42	Silver	Anthony Fernando; Ferdinand Aunzo; Jhonnel Ababa; Mhark Fernando	Golf	Men's team
43	Silver	Chihiro Ikeda; Regina de Guzman; Anya Tanpinco	Golf	Women's team
44	Silver	Tomohiko Hoshina	Judo	Men's +100kg
45	Silver	Nancy Quillotes	Judo	Women's -48kg
46	Silver	Noel Espinosa	Karate	Men's kata individual
47	Silver	Irineo Toribio	Karate	Men's kumite -60kg
48	Silver	Jose Mari Pabillore	Karate	Men's kumite +75kg
49	Silver	Cherli Tugday	Karate	Women's Open
50	Silver	Cherli Tugday; Ma. Esperanza Manansala; Lutche Metante; Mae Soriano	Karate	Women's kumite Team
51	Silver	Nancy Bercasio; Sonia Bruce	Lawn bowls	Women's pair
52	Silver	Brent Velasco	Muay Thai	Men's Bantamweight 54kg
53	Silver	May Libao	Muay Thai	Women's light flyweight 48kg
54	Silver	Anna Joy Fernandez	Muay Thai	Women's Flyweight 51kg
55	Silver	Maricel Subang	Muay Thai	Women's Bantamweight 54kg
56	Silver	Ana Marie Rey	Muay Thai	Women's Featherweight 57kg
57	Silver	Nerlyn Huinda	Pencak Silat	Women's Combat Class C 55-60kg
58	Silver	Casem Gema; Habluetzel Mildred; Vicente Mildred; Violeta dela Cruz	Petanque	Women's triples
59	Silver	Alvin Amposta; Nestor Cordova	Rowing	Men's lightweight double sculls
60	Silver	Midelle Gabiligno; Nida Cordova	Rowing	Women's double sculls
61	Silver	Gareth Leslie Holgate; Benjamin Joshua Saunders; Matthew Donato Saunders; Oliver Joseph Saunders; Andrew James Wolff; Austin Dacanay; Harry Morris; Jasper Ching; Mark Chatting; Michael Letts; Ndel Flower; Rubert Zappa	Rugby Union	Men's team
62	Silver	Emerson Villena; Lester Troy Tayong	Sailing	Men's 420
63	Silver	Ridgely Balladares; Rommel Chavez	Sailing	Men's 470
64	Silver	Rafael Buitre; Teodorico Asejo; Mark Gil Francisco; Richly Magsanay; Joel Mejarito	Sailing	Men's Farr Platu 25
65	Silver	Renerick Moreno	Windsurfing	Formula Windsurfing
66	Silver	German Paz	Windsurfing	Men's RS: X
67	Silver	Patricio Bernardo; Paul Brian Rosario; Gabriel Tong	Shooting	Men's skeet team
68	Silver	Eric Ang; Jethro Dionisio; Carag Carlos	Shooting	Men's Trap Team
69	Silver	Jacqueline de Guzman	Shooting	Women's skeet
70	Silver	James Walsh	Swimming	Men's 100m butterfly
71	Silver	Miguel Molina; Daniel Coakley; James Walsh; Kendrick Uy	Swimming	Men's 4x100m freestyle relay
72	Silver	Erica Totten	Swimming	Women's 200m butterfly
73	Silver	Alexander Briones	Taekwondo	Men's Middleweight -84kg
74	Silver	Loraine Lorelie Catalan	Taekwondo	Women's Flyweight -51kg
75	Silver	Kirstie Alora	Taekwondo	Women's Featherweight -59kg
76	Silver	Mary Antoinette Rivero	Taekwondo	Women's welterweight -67kg
77	Silver	Cecil Mamiit; Frederick Taino	Tennis	Men's doubles
78	Silver	Cecil Mamiit; Denise Dy	Tennis	Mixed doubles
79	Silver	Alex Sumagaysay; Diomedes Manalo; Joemar Ocquiana; Jose Ijalo; Junrey Dayumat; Manuel Maya; Ramie Llano; Ric Nacional; Ricky Sardena; Rolando Isidro Jr. Ruperto Sabijon; Suhod Hakim	Traditional boat race	Men's 10crews (500m)
80	Silver	Diomedes Manalo; Joemar Ocquiana; Jose Ijalo; Junrey Dayumat; Manuel Maya; Ric Nacional; Ricky Sardena; Rolando Isidro Jr. Ruperto Sabijon; Salvador Sumagaysay; Suhod Hakim; Usman Anterola	Traditional boat race	Men's 10crews (1000m)
81	Silver	Alejandra Orola; Amina Anuddin; Ivory Ablig; Jinky Agustin; Joy Ann Nero; Leonita Banlat; Maria Ailene Padrones; Maria Theresa Realizan; Mary Neth Bechayda; Marietta Alba; Ruditha Poralan; Sanita Kasim; Stephanie Deriada	Traditional boat race	Women's 10crews (500m)
82	Silver	George Vilog	Triathlon	Men's Triathlon
83	Silver	Alessandra Araullo	Triathlon	Women's Triathlon
84	Silver	Allan Payawal; Almax Laurel; Dale Evangelista; Danny dela Torre; Ernesto Pabalan; Frazier Alamara; Johnny Uba; Michael Jorolan; Monsuito Pelenio; Norton Alamara; Sherwin dela Paz; Tani Gomez; Teodoro Cañete	Water Polo	Men's team
85	Silver	Renante Briones	Weightlifting	Men's 105kg
86	Silver	Jimmy Angana	Wrestling	Men's 66kg Freestyle
87	Silver	Alven Aragon	Wrestling	Men's 74kg Freestyle
88	Silver	Marcus Valda	Wrestling	Men's 84kg Freestyle
89	Silver	Gemma Silverio	Wrestling	Women's 59kg Freestyle
90	Silver	Benjie Rivera	Wushu	Men's sanda 56kg
91	Silver	Mary Jane Estimar	Wushu	Women's sanda 52kg

=== Bronze ===
No.	Medal	Name	Sport	Event
1	Bronze	Marvin Cordero; Mark Javier; Ian Wayne Larsen	Archery	Men's team recurve
2	Bronze	Juney Bano; Julius Felicisimo Nierras; Rodrigo Tanuan Jr. Ernie Candelario	Athletics	Men's 4x400m Relay
3	Bronze	Eduardo Buenavista	Athletics	Men's Marathon
4	Bronze	Emerson Obiena	Athletics	Men's pole vault
5	Bronze	Jobert Delicano	Athletics	Men's triple jump
6	Bronze	Eliezer Sunang	Athletics	Men's shot put
7	Bronze	Arnold Villarube	Athletics	Men's Decathlon
8	Bronze	Mercedita Manipol	Athletics	Women's 10000m
9	Bronze	Jho-Ann Banayag	Athletics	Women's Marathon
10	Bronze	Narcisa Atienza	Athletics	Women's Heptathlon
11	Bronze	Aurora Adriano; Victoria Lynne Brick; Joan Grajales; Amira Issa; Melissa Jacob; Diana Rose Jose; Machiko Matsuno; Minerva Narciza; Cassandra Noel Tioseco; Fatima Tolentino; Sylvia Marie Valencia; Emelia Vega	Basketball	Women's team
12	Bronze	Benjamin Guevarra Jr. James Al Ortega	Billiards	Men's snooker doubles
13	Bronze	Antonio Gabica	Billiards	Men's 9-Ball Pool Singles
14	Bronze	Iris Ranola	Billiards	Women's 6-Red Snooker Singles
15	Bronze	Rubilen Amit	Billiards	Women's 8-Ball Pool Singles
16	Bronze	Dulce Carina Purugganan	Bodybuilding	Women's Fitness
17	Bronze	Bill Vicente Vicera	Boxing	Men's Pinweight 45kg
18	Bronze	Albert Pabila	Boxing	Men's light flyweight 48kg
19	Bronze	Nino Surban	Cycling	Men's cross country
20	Bronze	Baby Marites Bitbit	Cycling	Women's cross country
21	Bronze	Baby Marites Bitbit	Cycling	Women's Time Trial
22	Bronze	Jan Paul Morales	Cycling	Men's 1km Time Trial
23	Bronze	Alfie Catalan; Arnold Marcelo; Paterno Curtan Jr. Ronald Gorantes	Cycling	Men's team Pursuit
24	Bronze	Emmanuel Reyes; Maira Rosete	Dancesport	Standard Waltz
25	Bronze	Reynato Rener Mercado; Judith Anne Melencio	Dancesport	Latin America Cha Cha Cha
26	Bronze	John Erolle Melencio; Dearlie Gerodias	Dancesport	Latin America Samba
27	Bronze	Zardo Domenios	Diving	Men's 3m springboard
28	Bronze	Rolando Canlas Jr.	Fencing	Men's individual Foil
29	Bronze	Edmon Velez	Fencing	Men's individual Sabre
30	Bronze	Harlene Orendain; Ma. Del Carmen Galvez; Mary Catherine Kong; Michelle Bruzola	Fencing	Women's team Epee
31	Bronze	Michelle Mancenido	Fencing	Women's individual Foil
32	Bronze	Veena Tessa Nuestro	Fencing	Women's individual Foil
33	Bronze	Joanna Franquelli	Fencing	Women's individual Sabre
34	Bronze	Anelita Servillon; Carla Paredes; Farpabeth Limbo; Francine Ruffy; Glaiza Artus; Glenda Bascon; Krishna Javier; Luzviminda Pacubas; Maria Aurora Tanjangco; Marigen Ariel; Miriam Merlin; Shella Ninobla; Simonette Gaspay; Tiffany Batungbacal	Futsal	Women's team
35	Bronze	Rick Jayson Senales	Judo	Men's -90kg
36	Bronze	Helen Dawa	Judo	Women's -52kg
37	Bronze	Estie Gay Liwanen	Judo	Women's -57kg
38	Bronze	Karen Solomon	Judo	Women's -70kg
39	Bronze	Ruth Dugaduga	Judo	Women's -78kg
40	Bronze	Erika Joy Ponciano	Judo	Women's +78kg
41	Bronze	Ramon Hector Franco	Karate	Men's kumite -55kg
42	Bronze	Rolando Lagman	Karate	Men's kumite -65kg
43	Bronze	Michael Duamyag; Ricardo Elinon; Joel Gonzaga; Rolando Lagman; Erlando Metante; Sugar Ray Metante; Jose Mari Pabillore	Karate	Men's kumite Team
44	Bronze	Mae Soriano	Karate	Women's kumite -53kg
45	Bronze	Ma. Esperanza Manansala	Karate	Women's kumite -60kg
46	Bronze	Cherli Tugday	Karate	Women's kumite +60kg
47	Bronze	Angelo Morales; Emmanuel Portacio; Hommer Mercado	Lawn bowls	Men's triples
48	Bronze	Rosita Bradborn	Lawn bowls	Women's singles
49	Bronze	Ainie Knight; Milagros Witheridge; Ronalyn Greenlees	Lawn bowls	Women's triples
50	Bronze	Romnick Ghie Pabalate	Muay Thai	Men's light flyweight 48kg
51	Bronze	Roland Claro	Muay Thai	Men's Flyweight 51kg
52	Bronze	Zaidi Laruan	Muay Thai	Men's Featherweight 57kg
53	Bronze	Jay Olod	Muay Thai	Men's Lightweight 60kg
54	Bronze	Jay Harold Gregorio	Muay Thai	Men's welterweight 67kg
55	Bronze	Jul-Omar Abdulhakim	Pencak Silat	Men's Combat Class A 45-50kg
56	Bronze	Emraida Asmad	Pencak Silat	Women's Combat Class B 50-55kg
57	Bronze	Jose Rodriguez	Rowing	Men's single sculls
58	Bronze	Clothelde Nillas; Johna Lyn Pedrita	Rowing	Women's lightweight double sculls
59	Bronze	Danilo Alipan; Joel Carbonilla; Harrison Castanares; Hector Memarion; Jerome Santiago; Metodio Suico Jr.	Sepak Takraw	Men's Hoop
60	Bronze	Irene Apdon; Deseree Autor; Sarah Jane Catain	Sepak Takraw	Women's doubles
61	Bronze	Irene Apdon; Deseree Autor; Rhea Padrigo; Josefina Maat; Gelyn Evora	Sepak Takraw	Women's regu
62	Bronze	Irene Apdon; Deseree Autor; Rhea Padrigo; Josefina Maat; Gelyn Evora; Sarah Jan Catain	Sepak Takraw	Women's Hoop
63	Bronze	Emerito Concepcion	Shooting	Men's 10m Air Rifle
64	Bronze	Robert Andre Garcia	Squash	Men's singles
65	Bronze	Kendrick Uy	Swimming	Men's 100m freestyle
66	Bronze	Miguel Molina	Swimming	Men's 200m freestyle
67	Bronze	Ryan Arabejo	Swimming	Men's 200m freestyle
68	Bronze	Erica Totten	Swimming	Women's 200m freestyle
69	Bronze	Jaclyn Pangilinan	Swimming	Women's 100m breaststroke
70	Bronze	Jaclyn Pangilinan	Swimming	Women's 200m breaststroke
71	Bronze	Erica Totten; Maria Georgina Gandionco; Jaclyn Pangilinan; Nicole Santiago	Swimming	Women's 4x100m freestyle relay
72	Bronze	Carlos Jose Padilla V	Taekwondo	Men's Flyweight -58kg
73	Bronze	Ernesto Juan Mendoza III	Taekwondo	Men's welterweight -78kg
74	Bronze	Kathleen Eunice Alora	Taekwondo	Women's finweight -47kg
75	Bronze	Esther Marie Singson	Taekwondo	Women's Bantamweight -55kg
76	Bronze	Veronica Domingo	Taekwondo	Women's Lightweight -63kg
77	Bronze	Maria Criselda Roxas	Taekwondo	Women's Middleweight -72kg
78	Bronze	Denise Dy; Dianne Matias	Tennis	Women's doubles
79	Bronze	Frederick Taino; Dianne Matias	Tennis	Mixed doubles
80	Bronze	Frederick Taino; Patrick John Tierro; Cecil Mamiit; Johnny Arcilla	Tennis	Men's team
81	Bronze	Czarina Arevalo; Denise Dy; Dianne Matias; Michelle Pang	Tennis	Women's team
82	Bronze	Alejandra Orola; Amina Anuddin; Ivory Ablig; Jinky Agustin; Joy Ann Nero; Leonita Banlat; Maria Ailene Padrones; Maria Theresa Realizan; Maridel Manaban; Marietta Alba; Ruditha Poralan; Sanita Kasim	Traditional boat race	Women's 10crews (1000m)
83	Bronze	August Benedicto	Triathlon	Men's Duathlon
84	Bronze	Arland Benedict Macasieb	Triathlon	Men's Triathlon
85	Bronze	Analiza Dysangco	Triathlon	Women's Duathlon
86	Bronze	Maria Melliza Gayle Lucas	Triathlon	Women's Triathlon
87	Bronze	Richard Pep Agosto	Weightlifting	Men's 105kg
88	Bronze	Hidilyn Diaz	Weightlifting	Women's 58kg
89	Bronze	Geylord Coveta	Windsurfing	Mistral Light
90	Bronze	Margarito Angana	Wrestling	Men's 55kg Freestyle
91	Bronze	Roque Mana-ay Jr.	Wrestling	Men's 60kg Freestyle
92	Bronze	Maribel Jambora	Wrestling	Women's 48kg Freestyle
93	Bronze	Maria Cristina Vergara	Wrestling	Women's 51kg Freestyle
94	Bronze	Daniel Parantac	Wushu	Men's taolu Taijiquan
95	Bronze	Janice Hung	Wushu	Women's taolu Taijiquan
96	Bronze	Rene Catalan	Wushu	Men's sanda 52kg

=== Multiple ===
Name	Sport	1st place, gold medalist(s)	2nd place, silver medalist(s)	3rd place, bronze medalist(s)	Total
Miguel Molina	Swimming	4	1	1	6
Ryan Arabejo	Swimming	3	0	1	4
Emmanuel Reyes	Dancesport	2	2	1	5
Maira Rosete	Dancesport	2	2	1	5
Daniel Coakley	Swimming	2	1	0	3
Amaya Paz	Archery	2	0	0	2
Benjamin Tolentino Jr.	Rowing	2	0	0	2
Cecil Mamiit	Tennis	1	2	1	4
James Walsh	Swimming	1	2	0	3
Emerson Segui	Fencing	1	1	0	2
Rexel Ryan Fabriga	Diving	1	1	0	2
Sheila Mae Perez	Diving	1	1	0	2
Baby Marites Bitbit	Cycling	1	0	2	3
Alfie Catalan	Cycling	1	0	1	2
Antonio Gabica	Billiards	1	0	1	2
Jose Rodriguez	Rowing	1	0	1	2
Julius Felicisimo Nierras	Athletics	1	0	1	2
Michelle Bruzola	Fencing	1	0	1	2
Rubilen Amit	Billiards	1	0	1	2
Cherli Tugday	Karate	0	2	1	2
Dearlie Gerodias	Dancesport	0	2	1	3
John Erolle Melencio	Dancesport	0	2	1	3
Zardo Domenios	Diving	0	2	1	3
Anyan Tanpinco	Golf	0	2	0	2
Julius Sermona	Athletics	0	2	0	2
Walbert Mendoza	Fencing	0	2	0	2
Diomedes Manalo; Joemar Ocquiana; Jose Ijalo; Junrey Dayumat; Manuel Maya; Ric Nacional; Ricky Sardena; Rolando Isidro Jr.Ruperto Sabijon; Suhod Hakim	Traditional Boat Race	0	2	0	2
Denise Dy	Tennis	0	1	2	2
Erica Totten	Swimming	0	1	2	2
Frederick Taino	Tennis	0	1	2	2
Edmon Velez	Fencing	0	1	1	2
Herlene Orendain	Fencing	0	1	1	2
Joanna Franquelli	Fencing	0	1	1	2
Jose Mari Pabillore	Karate	0	1	1	2
Kendrick Uy	Swimming	0	1	1	2
Ma. Esperanza Manansala	Karate	0	1	1	2
Mae Soriano	Karate	0	1	1	2
Michelle Mancenido	Fencing	0	1	1	2
Rolando Canlas Jr.	Fencing	0	1	1	2
Veena Tessa Nuestro	Fencing	0	1	1	2
Alejandra Orola; Amina Anuddin; Ivory Ablig; Jinky Agustin; Joy Ann Nero; Leonita Banlat; Maria Ailene Padrones; Maria Theresa Realizan; Marietta Alba; Ruditha Poralan; Sanita Kasim	Traditional Boat Race	0	1	1	2
Desiree Autor	Sepak Takraw	0	0	3	3
Dianne Matias	Tennis	0	0	3	3
Irene Apdon	Sepak Takraw	0	0	3	3
Jaclyn Pangilinan	Swimming	0	0	3	2
Gelyn Evora	Sepak Takraw	0	0	2	2
Josefina Maat	Sepak Takraw	0	0	2	2
Rhea Padrigo	Sepak Takraw	0	0	2	2
Sarah Jane Catain	Sepak Takraw	0	0	2	2

== Medal summary ==
=== By sports ===
Sport	Gold	Silver	Bronze	Total
Aquatics	10	8	8	26
Athletics	5	7	9	21
Cycling	4	1	5	10
Fencing	3	6	6	15
Billiards and snooker	3	2	4	9
Dancesport	2	4	3	9
Wushu	2	2	3	7
Rowing	2	2	2	6
Archery	2	1	1	4
Softball	2	0	0	2
Boxing	1	12	2	15
Taekwondo	1	4	6	11
Judo	1	2	6	9
Tennis	1	2	4	7
Triathlon	1	2	4	7
Basketball	1	0	1	2
Karate	0	5	6	11
Muay	0	5	5	10
Sailing	0	5	1	6
Wrestling	0	4	4	8
Shooting	0	3	1	4
Traditional boat race	0	3	1	4
Golf	0	3	0	3
Lawn bowls	0	1	3	4
Pencak silat	0	1	2	3
Weightlifting	0	1	2	3
Baseball	0	1	0	1
Bowling	0	1	0	1
Equestrian	0	1	0	1
Pétanque	0	1	0	1
Rugby	0	1	0	1
Sepak takraw	0	0	4	4
Bodybuilding	0	0	1	1
Football	0	0	1	1
Squash	0	0	1	1
Totals (35 entries)	41	91	96	228

== Other results ==
Events are arranged chronologically; sports are arranged alphabetically. Events that won medals are excluded. For events currently ongoing in which the Philippines is not yet eliminated, see ongoing, below.

=== Shooting ===
- Women's 25M Pistol (individual)
  - 14th – Susan Aguado
- Women's 50M Rifle Prone (individual)
  - 9th – Nicoli Medina
- Men's 10M Air Pistol (individual)
  - 12th – Carolino Gonzales
- Men's 10M Air Rifle (team)
  - 4th – Philippines (Emerito Concepcion, Daryl Sandoval, Alfonso Hermoso)
- Men's 50M Air Pistol (individual)
  - 14th – Carolino Gonzales
- Men's 25M Standard Pistol (individual)
  - 5th – Tac Padilla
  - 13th – Robert Donalvo
  - 14th – Carolino Gonzales
- Men's 25M Standard Pistol (team)
  - 4th – Philippines (Nathaniel Padilla, Robert Donalvo, Carolino Gonzales)
- Women's 10m air pistol (Individual)
  - 12th – Susan Agualdo
- Men's 50M Rifle Prone (team)
  - 6th – Philippines (Eddie Tomas, Edwin Fernandez, Rocky Pardilla)
- Men's 50M Rifle Prone (individual)
  - 13th – Eddie Tomas
  - 15th – Edwin Fernandez
  - 18th – Rocky Pardilla
- Men's 25M Rapid Prone (individual)
  - 12th – Tac Padilla
  - 13th – Robert Donalvo
- Men's 25M Center Fire Pistol (team)
  - 4th – Philippines (Nathaniel Padilla, Robert Donalvo, Carolino Gonzales)
- Men's 25M Center Fire Pistol (individual)
  - 7th – Tac Padilla
  - 13th – Carolino Gonzales
  - 14th – Roberto Donalvo
- Men's 50M Rifle 3 position (individual)
  - 9th – Rocky Pardill
  - 10th – Edwin Fernandez
  - 12th – Eddie Tomas
- Men's 50M Rifle 3 position (team)
  - 4th – Philippines (Rocky Pardilla, Edwin Fernandez, Eddie Tomas)
- Men's skeet (individual)
  - Tied-5th – Paul Brian Rosario
  - 7th – Patricio Bernardo
  - 8th – Gabriel Tong

=== Table tennis ===
- Women's team:
  - Indonesia def. Philippines, 3-1
    - Ceria Nilasari (INA) def Andrea Balatbat (PHI) 3-1
    - Crisanta Abas (PHI) def Christine Ferliana (INA) 3-1
    - Nuni Sugiani (INA) def Ian Lariba (PHI) 3-0
    - Christine Ferliana (INA) def Andrea Balatbat (PHI) 3-0
  - Vietnam def. Philippines, 3-0
    - Mai Hoang my Thrang (VIE) def Crisanta Abas (PHI) 3-0
    - Mai Xuan Hang (VIE) def Andrea Balatbat (PHI) 3-0
    - Luong Thi Tam (VIE) def Ian Lariba (PHI) 3-0
  - Thailand def. Philippines, 3-0
    - Nanthana Komwong (THA) def Andrea Balatbat (PHI) 3-0
    - Anisara Munagsuk (THA) def Crisanta Abas (PHI) 3-0
    - Priyakan Triampo (THA) def Ian Lariba (PHI) 3-1
- Men's team
  - Philippines def. Cambodia, 3-0
    - Richard Gonzales (PHI) def Boroath Sam (CAM) 3-0
    - Julius Esposo (PHI) def Sovathanak Hout (CAM) 3-0
    - Henberd Ortalla (PHI) def Roathana Sun (CAM) 3-0
  - Singapore def. Philippines, 3-0
    - Gao Ning (SIN) def Henberd Ortalla (PHI) 3-0
    - Yang Zi (SIN) def Richard Gonzales (PHI) 3-1
    - Cai Xiaoli (SIN) def Rodel Ireneo Valle (PHI) 3-0
  - Thailand def. Philippines, 3-0
    - Phakpoom Sanguansin (THA) def Richard Gonzales (PHI) 3-0
    - Phuchong Sanguansin (THA) def Henberd Ortalla (PHI) 3-1
    - Chaisit Chaitat (THA) def Julius Esposo (PHI) 3-1

== Men's Basketball ==
=== Results ===
Team	Pts.	W	L	PF	PA	PD
Philippines	8	4	0	413	244	+169
Indonesia	7	3	1	284	252	+32
Malaysia	6	2	2	288	315	-27
Thailand	5	1	3	244	282	-38
Cambodia	4	0	4	262	398	-136

  - Pool stage: Cambodia 82-136 Philippines
  - Pool stage: Indonesia 49-75 Philippines
  - Pool stage: Malaysia 60-180 Philippines
  - Pool stage: Thailand 53-94 Philippines

== Women's Basketball ==
=== Results ===
Team	Pts.	W	L	PF	PA	PD
Malaysia	6	3	0	195	159	+36
Thailand	5	2	1	210	162	+48
Philippines	4	1	2	177	199	-22
Singapore	3	0	3	145	207	-62

  - Pool stage: Singapore 55-67 Philippines
  - Pool stage: Thailand 70-54 Philippines
  - Pool stage: Malaysia 74-56 Philippines

=== Football (soccer) ===
- Women:
  - Group A: Laos 2-2 Philippines (Goal scorers: Patrice Impelido (48'), Edna Agravante (50'))
  - Group A: Vietnam 10-0 Philippines
