= Traditional boat race at the 2007 SEA Games =

Traditional Boat Race at the 2007 SEA Games wes held Mapprachan Reservoir, Chon Buri, Thailand.

== Medal table ==
* Host nation (Thailand)

Rank	Nation	Gold	Silver	Bronze	Total
1	Myanmar	3	0	0	3
2	Indonesia	1	0	2	3
3	Philippines	0	3	1	4
4	Thailand*	0	1	1	2
Totals (4 entries)		4	4	4	12

== Medalists ==
=== Men ===
Event	Gold	Silver	Bronze
10 crews 500 m	Myanmar (MYA); Aung Ko; Aung Lin; Htoo Htoo; Kan Shwe; Kyaw Lin Tun; Min Min Zaw; Myo Mint Aung; Saw Ahal Balu; Saw Law Kail; Shwe Than Naing; Tun Tun Lin; Ye Aung Soe	Philippines (PHI); Alex Sumagaysay; Diomedes Manalo; Joemar Ocquiana; Jose Ijalo; Junrey Dayumat; Manuel Maya; Ramie Llano; Ric Nacional; Ricky Sardena; Rolando Isidro, Jr. Ruperto Sabijon; Suhod Hakim	Thailand (THA); Amnat Pinthong; Jirayut Nualthaisong; Montean Pudchaikeo; Oracha Phrangsuwan; Paiboon Chanpram; Samart Pimharn; Santas Mingwongyang; Somjet Suwanwichai; Suvitcha Hontaku; Thunyaboon Nasok; Tumma Khwanpracha; Vinya Seechumchuen
10 crews 1000 m	Myanmar (MYA); Aung Ko; Aung Lin; Htoo Htoo; Kan Shwe; Kyaw Lin Tun; Min Min Zaw; Myo Mint Aung; Saw Ahal Balu; Saw Law Kail; Shwe Than Naing; Tun Tun Lin; Ye Aung Soe	Philippines (PHI); Diomedes Manalo; Joemar Ocquiana; Jose Ijalo; Junrey Dayumat; Manuel Maya; Ric Nacional; Ricky Sardena; Rolando Isidro, Jr. Ruperto Sabijon; Salvador Sumagaysay; Suhod Hakim; Usman Anterola	Indonesia (INA); Abdul Azis; Agus Suryadi; Ahmad Supriadi; Amat; Asnaing; Budi Subaga; Dian Kurniawan; Didin Rusdiana; Herdoni; John Travolta; Riki Jamaris; Steven Sarimole

=== Women ===
Event	Gold	Silver	Bronze
10 crews 500 m	Myanmar (MYA); Cho The; May Thin Thin Aung; Moe Aye; Myat Su Mon; Myint Myint Moe; Nan Khin Mwe; Naw Ahker Moe; Nyin Wai Lwin; Nyo Nyo Win; Saw Myat Thu; Soe Thida; Than Than Swe; Zarni Win	Philippines (PHI); Alejandra Orola; Amina Anuddin; Ivory Ablig; Jinky Agustin; Joy Ann Nero; Leonita Banlat; Maria Ailene Padrones; Maria Theresa Realizan; Marietta Alba; Mary Neth Bechayda; Ruditha Poralan; Sanita Kasim; Stephennie Deriada	Indonesia (INA); Agustina Kabey; Anti Marwati; Astri Dwi Jayanti; Christina Kapolakari; Farida; Hartawan; Ibo Mintelda; Indiyani Tika; Jenny Selvis Yom; Minah Minawati; Multi; Seni Gantiani
10 crews 1000 m	Indonesia (INA); Agustina Kabey; Anti Marwati; Astri Dwi Jayanti; Farida; Hartawan; Ibo Mintelda; Imas Masripah; Indiyani Tika; Jenny Selvis Yom; Minah Minawati; Multi; Seni Gantiani	Thailand (THA); Bussarin Sukkaew; Nontiya Sawasdee; Nutcharat Chimbanrai; Pattama Sonit; Phamorn Junkhajorn; Praewpan Kawsri; Prangthip Onjaroen; Punnada Methanithis; Samruay Phuchim; Sasithorn Donse; Shayanee Threetong; Thanyada Chanprem	Philippines (PHI); Alejandra Orola; Amina Anuddin; Ivory Ablig; Jinky Agustin; Joy Ann Nero; Leonita Banlat; Maria Ailene Padrones; Maria Theresa Realizan; Maridel Manaban; Marietta Alba; Ruditha Poralan; Sanita Kasim
