= Edi Kurniawan =

Indonesian weightlifter (born 1988)

Personal information
- Born: 7 January 1988 (age 38) Lampung, Indonesia
- Height: 1.66 m (5 ft 5 in)
- Weight: 69 kg (152 lb)

Sport
- Country: Indonesia
- Sport: Weightlifting
- Event: 69 kg
Medal record
Men's weightlifting
Representing Indonesia
Southeast Asian Games
Gold medal – first place	2007 Bangkok	69 kg

Edi Kurniawan (born 7 January 1988, in Lampung) is an Indonesian weightlifter. He competed at the 2008 Summer Olympics in Beijing, China, twice represented Indonesia at the Universiade and won gold at the 2007 Southeast Asian Games in Bangkok, Thailand.

== Personal life ==
Kurniawan was born on 7 January 1988 in Lampung on the island of Sumatra, Indonesia.

== Career ==
One of Kurniawan's first events was the 2007 Southeast Asian Games in Bangkok, Thailand. He dominated the men's –69 kg category and won the gold medal.

Kurniawan made his Olympic debut at the 2008 Summer Olympics in Beijing, China. In the men's –69 kg category, held in the Beihang University Gymnasium, he successfully lifted 135 kg in the snatch, and hoisted 172 kg from his third and final attempt in the clean and jerk, for a total of 307 kg. He was ranked 12th overall.

He then represented Indonesia at the 2011 Summer Universiade in Shenzhen, China. This time contesting the men's –77 kg category, Kurniawan finished ninth with his total of 313 kg.

Two years later, Kirniawan took part in the 2013 Summer Universiade in Kazan, Russia. He again contested the men's –77 kg category but did not finish after unsuccessful snatch lifts.

His final International Weightlifting Federation recognised event was the 2017 Southeast Asia Games held in Kuala Lumpur, Malaysia. Kurniawan had moved up to the men's –85 kg category. He successfully lifted 141 kg in the snatch and hoisted 176 kg in the clean and jerk for a total of 317 kg. He was ranked fourth overall, just missing out on a medal.
