= Aung Khaing Win =

Burmese bodybuilder

- Professional bodybuilder

Personal info
- Born: Myanmar

Best statistics

Aung Khaing Win is a bodybuilder affiliated with the Myanmar Bodybuilding and Physique Sports Federation.

He won gold medals at the 2007 Southeast Asian Games and the 2013 SEA Championships. He was a four-time winner of Mr. Olympic.

== Career ==
Aung Khaing Win won the gold medal in the 70 kg bodybuilding category at the 2007 Southeast Asian Games, which was held at the 70th Anniversary Hall, Nakhon Ratchasima Rajabhat University, Nakhon Ratchasima, Thailand.

In 2013, he won the gold medal in the 60 kg bodybuilding category at the 2013 Southeast Asian Games, held at the Myanmar Convention Centre in Yangon, Myanmar, from 12 to 16 December.

== Competitive placings ==
- 2013 SEA Bodybuilding Championships
- 2012 SEA Championships 5th — Men Bodybuilding 75 kg
- 2011 Asian and World Bodybuilding & Physique Sports Championships 8th — Asian Men Bodybuilding 70 kg
- 2009 South East Asian Championships 4th — Men Bodybuilding 70 kg
- 2009 Asian Championships 6th — Men Bodybuilding 70 kg
- 2007 SEA Bodybuilding Championships
