= Vietnam at the 2007 SEA Games =

Vietnam at the 2007 Southeast Asian Games
- IOC code: VIE
- NOC: Vietnam Olympic Committee
- Website: www.voc.org.vn (in Vietnamese and English)

in Nakhon Ratchasima
- Competitors: 605 in 29 sports
- Medals Ranked 3rd: Gold 64 Silver 58 Bronze 82 Total 204

Southeast Asian Games appearances (overview)
- 1989; 1991; 1993; 1995; 1997; 1999; 2001; 2003; 2005; 2007; 2009; 2011; 2013; 2015; 2017; 2019; 2021; 2023; 2025; 2027; 2029

Vietnam participated in the 2007 Southeast Asian Games held in the city of Nakhon Ratchasima, Thailand from December 6, 2007 to December 16, 2007.

== Participation details ==
Vietnam sent a total of 839 competitors and officials to the 2007 SEA Games.

- 605 competitors
- 234 officials

Out of the 605 competitors,

- 65 competed in football, competing for 2 gold medals.
- 40 competed in shooting and archery, competing for 12 gold medals.
- 25 competed in karatedo competing for 4 gold medals.
- 14 competed in pencak silat competing for 3 gold medals.
- 18 competed in judo competing for 12 gold medals.
- 24 competed in swimming, 6 in swimming events competing for 1 gold medal and 5 in springboard events competing for 1 gold medal, 13 in water polo events.
- 15 competed in canoeing, competing for 4 gold medals.
- 15 competed in rowing competing for 1 gold medal.
- 26 competed in cycling competing for 2 gold medals.
- 16 competed in taekwondo competing for 3 gold medals.
- 35 competed in athletics competing for 7 gold medals.
- 24 competed in fencing competing for 2 gold medals.
- 15 competed in boxing competing for 1 gold medal.
- 14 competed in wrestling competing for 4 gold medals.
- 9 competed in dancesport competing for 2 gold medals.
- 7 competed in bodybuilding competing for 1 gold medal.
- 16 competed in weightlifting competing for 2 gold medals.
- 18 competed in wushu competing for 3 gold medals.
- 32 competed in sepak takraw competing for 1 gold medal.
- 10 competed in table tennis.
- 23 competed in gymnastics competing for 7 gold medals.
- 17 competed in billiards-snooker.
- 9 competed in badminton.
- 32 competed in volleyball.
- 18 competed in pétanque.
- 8 competed in tennis.
- 7 competed in golf.
- 12 competed in bowling.

Total sport entries: 29/45

== Medals ==
Rank	Sport	Gold	Silver	Bronze	Total
1	Wrestling	8	0	0	8
2	Shooting	7	3	11	21
3	Athletics	6	1	4	11
4	Karatedo	6	0	0	6
4	Wushu	6	0	0	6
6	Gymnastics	5	4	2	11
7	Fencing	3	0	1	4
8	Canoeing	3	0	0	3
9	Weightlifting	1	2	1	4
10	Rowing	1	1	3	5
11	Cycling	1	1	2	4
12	Billiards-snooker	1	1	0	2
13	Petanque	1	0	3	4
14	Swimming	1	0	1	2
15	Bodybuilding	1	0	0	1
16	Sepak Takraw	0	3	2	5
17	Boxing	0	2	4	6
18	Table Tennis	0	1	2	3
19	Tennis	0	0	1	1
Totals (19 entries)		51	19	37	107
