= Thailand at the 2007 SEA Games =

Thailand at the 2007 Southeast Asian Games
- IOC code: THA
- NOC: National Olympic Committee of Thailand
- Website: www.olympicthai.or.th/eng (in English and Thai)

in Nakhon Ratchasima
- Competitors: 982
- Flag bearer: Boonsak Ponsana (badminton)
- Medals Ranked 1st: Gold 181 Silver 124 Bronze 103 Total 408

Southeast Asian Games appearances (overview)
- 1961; 1965; 1967; 1969; 1971; 1973; 1975; 1977; 1979; 1981; 1983; 1985; 1987; 1989; 1991; 1993; 1995; 1997; 1999; 2001; 2003; 2005; 2007; 2009; 2011; 2013; 2015; 2017; 2019; 2021; 2023; 2025; 2027; 2029

Thailand participated in and hosted the 2007 Southeast Asian Games which were primarily held in the city of Nakhon Ratchasima from 6 December 2007 to 16 December 2007.

== Participation details ==
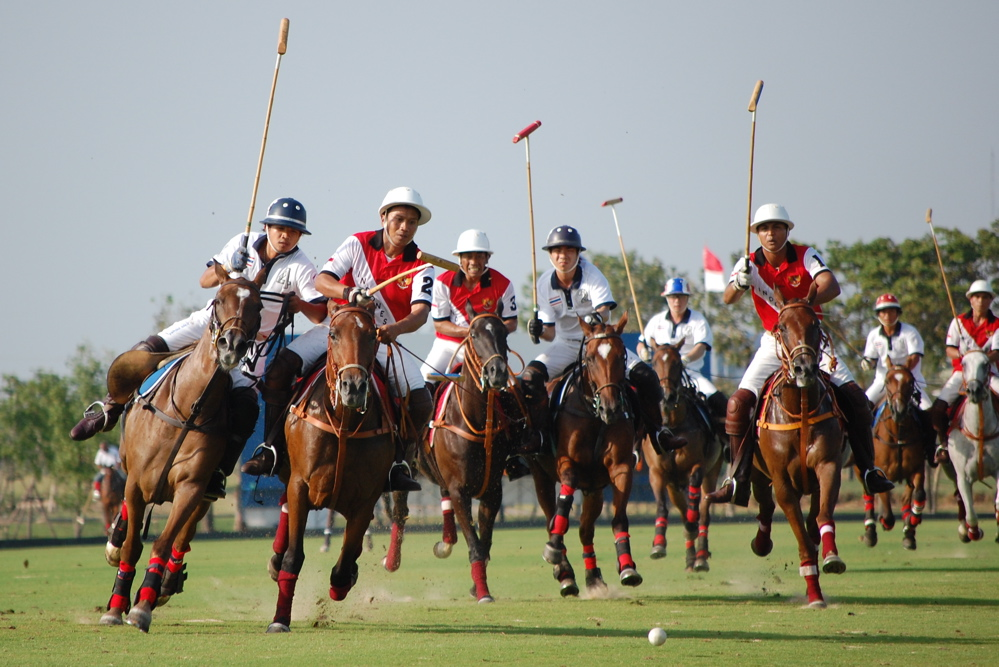
Indonesia plays against Thailand in SEA Games Polo 2007
