= List of SEA Games medalists in table tennis =

This is the list of Southeast Asian Games medalists in table tennis from 1959 to present.

Medalists from SEA Games 1959-1971, 1975-1979 & 1985-1995 are incomplete.

== Results ==
=== Men's singles ===
Games	Gold	Silver	Bronze
1961 Yangon			
1965 Kuala Lumpur	Khau Bou (CAM)	Yang Chho Nam (CAM)	Tranh Thanh Duong (VNM)
1967 Bangkok	Le Van Inh (VNM)	Chayanond Wuwanich (THA)	Lim Hee Peng (MAL)
1967 Bangkok	Le Van Inh (VNM)	Chayanond Wuwanich (THA)	Le Van Tiet (VNM)
1969 Bangkok	Soong Poh Wah (MAL)	Pradit Pivitsiripake (THA)	Supachai (THA)
1969 Bangkok	Soong Poh Wah (MAL)	Pradit Pivitsiripake (THA)	Cao Le Hung (VNM)
1971 Kuala Lumpur	Chuchai Plernpruksa (THA)	Yang Chho Nam (KHM)	Tan Koi Kok (SIN)
1971 Kuala Lumpur	Chuchai Plernpruksa (THA)	Yang Chho Nam (KHM)	Soong Poh Wah (MAL)
1973 Singapore	Peong Tah Seng (MAL)	Vuong Chinh Hoc (VNM)	Chuchai Plernpruksa (THA)
1973 Singapore	Peong Tah Seng (MAL)	Vuong Chinh Hoc (VNM)	Soong Poh Wah (MAL)
1975 Bangkok	Peong Tah Seng (MAL)	Fan Sim Wai (MAL)	Chai Chong Boon (SIN)
1975 Bangkok	Peong Tah Seng (MAL)	Fan Sim Wai (MAL)	Sanan Worasuksri (THA)
1977 Kuala Lumpur	Empie Wuisan (INA)	Faisal Rachman (INA)	Peong Tah Seng (MAL)
1977 Kuala Lumpur	Empie Wuisan (INA)	Faisal Rachman (INA)	Somdej Saichiborisoot (THA)
1979 Jakarta	Gunawan Sutedja (INA)	Empie Wuisan (INA)	Chaisak Atichartpongsuk (THA)
1979 Jakarta	Gunawan Sutedja (INA)	Empie Wuisan (INA)	Chayanond Wuwanich (THA)
1981 Manila	Gunawan Sutedja (INA)	Faisal Rachman (INA)	Chayanond Wuwanich (THA)
1981 Manila	Gunawan Sutedja (INA)	Faisal Rachman (INA)	Chaisak Atichartpongsuk (THA)
1983 Singapore	Sinyo Supit (INA)	Faisal Rachman (INA)	Peong Tah Seng (MAL)
1983 Singapore	Sinyo Supit (INA)	Faisal Rachman (INA)	Chartchai Teekavirakit (THA)
1985 Bangkok	Limpisrivanich Vich (THA)	Lim Chin Leong (MAL)	Haryono Wong Tye (INA)
1987 Jakarta	Haryono Wong Tye (INA)	Chartchai Teekavirakit (THA)	Lim Chon Leong (MAL)
1987 Jakarta	Haryono Wong Tye (INA)	Chartchai Teekavirakit (THA)	Sinyo Supit (INA)
1989 Kuala Lumpur	Lim Chin Leong (MAS)	Manop Kantawang (THA)	Haryono Wong Tye (INA)
1989 Kuala Lumpur	Lim Chin Leong (MAS)	Manop Kantawang (THA)	Anton Suseno (INA)
1991 Manila	Anton Suseno (INA)	Hadiyudo Prayitno (INA)	Tran Tuan An (VIE)
1991 Manila	Anton Suseno (INA)	Hadiyudo Prayitno (INA)	Nguyen Minh Hien (VIE)
1993 Singapore	Anton Suseno (INA)	Hadijudo Prayitno (INA)	Eng Tian Syh (MAS)
1993 Singapore	Anton Suseno (INA)	Hadijudo Prayitno (INA)	Vicharn Arunothaipipat (THA)
1995 Chiang Mai	Vu Manh Cuong (VIE)	Indonesia (INA)	Indonesia (INA)
1995 Chiang Mai	Vu Manh Cuong (VIE)	Indonesia (INA)	Thailand (THA)
1997 Jakarta	M Al Arkam (INA)	Hadiyudo Prayitno (INA)	Chaisit Chaitat (THA)
1997 Jakarta	M Al Arkam (INA)	Hadiyudo Prayitno (INA)	Vu Manh Cuong (VIE)
1999 Bandar Seri Begawan	Duan Yongjun (SIN)	Anton Seseno (INA)	Richard Gonzales (PHI)
1999 Bandar Seri Begawan	Duan Yongjun (SIN)	Anton Seseno (INA)	Zhang Taiyong (SIN)
2001 Kuala Lumpur	Vu Manh Cuong (VIE)	Ismu Harinto (INA)	Duan Yongjun (SIN)
2001 Kuala Lumpur	Vu Manh Cuong (VIE)	Ismu Harinto (INA)	Đoàn Kiến Quốc (VIE)
2003 Hanoi	Tran Tuan Quynh (VIE)	Phakphoom Sanguansin (THA)	Cai Xiaoli (SIN)
2003 Hanoi	Tran Tuan Quynh (VIE)	Phakphoom Sanguansin (THA)	Zhang Taiyong (SIN)
2005 Manila	Muhamad Hussein (INA)	Richard Gonzales (PHI)	Yang Zi (SIN)
2005 Manila	Muhamad Hussein (INA)	Richard Gonzales (PHI)	Đoàn Kiến Quốc (VIE)
2007 Nakhon Ratchasima	Gao Ning (SIN)	Nguyen Nam Hai (VIE)	Phakpoom Sanguansin (THA)
2007 Nakhon Ratchasima	Gao Ning (SIN)	Nguyen Nam Hai (VIE)	Phuchong Sanguansin (THA)
2009 Vientiane	Gao Ning (SIN)	Yang Zi (SIN)	Richard Gonzales (PHI)
2009 Vientiane	Gao Ning (SIN)	Yang Zi (SIN)	Phakpoom Sanguansin (THA)
2011 Palembang/Jakarta	Gao Ning (SIN)	Yang Zi (SIN)	Santoso Ficky Supi (INA)
2011 Palembang/Jakarta	Gao Ning (SIN)	Yang Zi (SIN)	Tran Tuan Quynh (VIE)
2013 Naypyitaw	Zhan Jian (SIN)	Lê Tiến Đạt (VIE)	Richard Gonzales (PHI)
2013 Naypyitaw	Zhan Jian (SIN)	Lê Tiến Đạt (VIE)	Clarence Chew (SIN)
2015 Singapore	Gao Ning (SIN)	Richard Gonzales (PHI)	Clarence Chew (SIN)
2015 Singapore	Gao Ning (SIN)	Richard Gonzales (PHI)	Padasak Tanviriyavechakul (THA)
2017 Kuala Lumpur	Gao Ning (SGP)	Clarence Chew (SGP)	Padasak Tanviriyavechakul (THA)
2017 Kuala Lumpur	Gao Ning (SGP)	Clarence Chew (SGP)	Richard Gonzales (PHI)
2019 Philippines	Pang Yew En Koen (SGP)	Clarence Chew (SGP)	Padasak Tanviriyavechakul (THA)
2019 Philippines	Pang Yew En Koen (SGP)	Clarence Chew (SGP)	Richard Gonzales (PHI)
2021 Vietnam	Nguyễn Đức Tuân (VIE)	Phakpoom Sanguansin (THA)	Clarence Chew (SGP)
2021 Vietnam	Nguyễn Đức Tuân (VIE)	Phakpoom Sanguansin (THA)	Nguyễn Anh Tú (VIE)
2023 Cambodia	Izaac Quek (SGP)	Nguyễn Anh Tú (VIE)	Nguyễn Đức Tuân (VIE)
2023 Cambodia	Izaac Quek (SGP)	Nguyễn Anh Tú (VIE)	Leong Chee Feng (MAS)
2025 Thailand	Izaac Quek (SGP)	Muhammad Bima Abdi Negara (INA)	Muhammad Naufal Junindra (INA)
2025 Thailand	Izaac Quek (SGP)	Muhammad Bima Abdi Negara (INA)	Nguyễn Anh Tú (VIE)

=== Men's doubles ===
Games	Gold	Silver	Bronze
1961 Yangon			
1965 Kuala Lumpur	South Vietnam (VNM); Huynh Van Ngoc; Tranh Thanh Duong	Cambodia (CAM); Yang Chho Nam; Tan Serey	Singapore (SIN); Sin Poh Lin; Lim Wai Sheng
1967 Bangkok	Thailand (THA); Pradit Pivitsiripake; Surasak Kokiettaveechai	Malaysia (MAL); Foong Sek Seong; Lee Mun Chew	Thailand (THA); Chayanond Wuwanich; Chuchai Plernpruksa
1967 Bangkok	Thailand (THA); Pradit Pivitsiripake; Surasak Kokiettaveechai	Malaysia (MAL); Foong Sek Seong; Lee Mun Chew	South Vietnam (VNM); Cao Le Hung; Huynh Van Ngoc
1969 Bangkok	South Vietnam (VNM); Le Van Inh; Tranh Thanh Duong	Malaysia (MAL); Soong Poh Wah; Lim Hee Peng	Thailand (THA); Supachai; Chuchai Plernpruksa
1969 Bangkok	South Vietnam (VNM); Le Van Inh; Tranh Thanh Duong	Malaysia (MAL); Soong Poh Wah; Lim Hee Peng	Burma (BIR); Ba Wai; Maung Maung Win
1971 Kuala Lumpur	Singapore (SIN); Tan Khong Hong; Tan Kai Kok	Thailand (THA); K. Par Chan; Supachai	Thailand (THA); Chuchai Plernpruksa; L. Kumuth
1971 Kuala Lumpur	Singapore (SIN); Tan Khong Hong; Tan Kai Kok	Thailand (THA); K. Par Chan; Supachai	Malaysia (MAL); Peong Tah Seng; Yong Ng Loong
1973 Singapore	Singapore (SIN); Tan Yong Hong; Chia Chong Boon	South Vietnam (VNM); Le Van Inh; Tranh Thanh Duong	Malaysia (MAL); Peong Tah Seng; Lim Hee Peng
1973 Singapore	Singapore (SIN); Tan Yong Hong; Chia Chong Boon	South Vietnam (VNM); Le Van Inh; Tranh Thanh Duong	South Vietnam (VNM); Tran Cong Minh; Vuong Chinh Hoc
1975 Bangkok	Singapore (SIN); Leow Hong Cheong; Yap Chin Boon	Singapore (SIN); Chai Chong Boon; Tan Kai Kok	Burma (BIR); Aung Shein; Ba Win
1975 Bangkok	Singapore (SIN); Leow Hong Cheong; Yap Chin Boon	Singapore (SIN); Chai Chong Boon; Tan Kai Kok	Malaysia (MAL); Soong Poh Wah; Peong Tah Seng
1977 Kuala Lumpur	Indonesia (INA); Empie Wuisan; Gunawan Sutedja	Indonesia (INA); Faisal Rachman; Sinyo Supit	Singapore (SIN); Tan Kai Kok; Chia Chong Boon
1977 Kuala Lumpur	Indonesia (INA); Empie Wuisan; Gunawan Sutedja	Indonesia (INA); Faisal Rachman; Sinyo Supit	Malaysia (MAL); Peong Tah Seng; Tay Tong Kee
1979 Jakarta	Indonesia (INA); Empie Wuisan; Sinyo Supit	Indonesia (INA); Gunawan Sutedja; Faisal Rachman	Singapore (SIN); Yap Chin Boon; Lee Yong Kong
1979 Jakarta	Indonesia (INA); Empie Wuisan; Sinyo Supit	Indonesia (INA); Gunawan Sutedja; Faisal Rachman	Thailand (THA); Chayanond Wuwanich; Chaisak Atichartpongsuk
1981 Manila	Indonesia (INA); Sinyo Supit; Tony Meringgi	Indonesia (INA); Haryono Wong Tye; Faisal Rachman	Thailand (THA); Opas Riewroengsul; Manop Kantawang
1981 Manila	Indonesia (INA); Sinyo Supit; Tony Meringgi	Indonesia (INA); Haryono Wong Tye; Faisal Rachman	Thailand (THA); Chayanond Wuwanich; Chaisak Atichartpongsuk
1983 Singapore	Indonesia (INA); Sinyo Supit; Sugiharto Suteja	Indonesia (INA); Faisal Rachman; Haryono Wong Tye	Singapore (SIN); Yueng Hin Choong; Ang Wah Heng
1983 Singapore	Indonesia (INA); Sinyo Supit; Sugiharto Suteja	Indonesia (INA); Faisal Rachman; Haryono Wong Tye	Singapore (SIN); Png Kim Siang; Lee Yew Chye
1985 Bangkok	Indonesia (INA); Tony Swingly Meringgi; Abdul Rodjak	Malaysia (MAL); Peong Tah Seng; Kok Chong Fatt	Thailand (THA); Limpisrivanich Vich; Kriengkraipetch Panumas
1985 Bangkok	Indonesia (INA); Tony Swingly Meringgi; Abdul Rodjak	Malaysia (MAL); Peong Tah Seng; Kok Chong Fatt	Thailand (THA); Manop Kantawang; Chayanond Wuwanich
1987 Jakarta	Indonesia (INA); Tony Swingly Meringgi; Sinyo Supit	Thailand (THA); Manop Kantawang; Chartchai Teekavirakit	Thailand (THA); Kriengkraipetch Panumas; Poonsak AA
1987 Jakarta	Indonesia (INA); Tony Swingly Meringgi; Sinyo Supit	Thailand (THA); Manop Kantawang; Chartchai Teekavirakit	Indonesia (INA); Haryono Wong Tye; Fabian Fadli
1989 Kuala Lumpur	Indonesia (INA); Tony Swingly Meringgi; Haryono Wong Tye	Malaysia (MAS); Lim Chin Leong; Peong Tah Seng	Malaysia (MAS); Lim Mui Liang; Tan Liang Chenck
1989 Kuala Lumpur	Indonesia (INA); Tony Swingly Meringgi; Haryono Wong Tye	Malaysia (MAS); Lim Chin Leong; Peong Tah Seng	Indonesia (INA); Tjan Lie Yang; Eddy Soetomo
1991 Manila	Thailand (THA); Vicharn Arunothaipipat; Kriengkraipetch Panumas	Indonesia (INA); Eddy Soetomo; Hadiyudo Prayitmo	Malaysia (MAS); Eng Tian Syh; Tay Choon Chai
1991 Manila	Thailand (THA); Vicharn Arunothaipipat; Kriengkraipetch Panumas	Indonesia (INA); Eddy Soetomo; Hadiyudo Prayitmo	Indonesia (INA); Anton Suseno; Rozi Fatkhur
1993 Singapore	Indonesia (INA); Hadijudo Prayitno; Deddy Da Costa	Malaysia (MAS); Yong Hong Cheh; Khor Kok Seong	Vietnam (VIE); Nguyễn Đức Long; Vũ Mạnh Cường
1993 Singapore	Indonesia (INA); Hadijudo Prayitno; Deddy Da Costa	Malaysia (MAS); Yong Hong Cheh; Khor Kok Seong	Thailand (THA); Vicharn Arunothaipipat; K Panomas
1995 Chiang Mai	Indonesia (INA)	Indonesia (INA)	Malaysia (MAS); Eng Tian Syh; Lim Chin Leong
1995 Chiang Mai	Indonesia (INA)	Indonesia (INA)	Thailand (THA)
1997 Jakarta	Indonesia (INA); M Al Arkam; Deddy Da Costa	Singapore (SIN); Sen Yew Fai; Koh C Guan	Indonesia (INA); Ismu Harinto; Hadiyudo Prayitmo
1997 Jakarta	Indonesia (INA); M Al Arkam; Deddy Da Costa	Singapore (SIN); Sen Yew Fai; Koh C Guan	Malaysia (MAS); Yong Hong Cheh; Eng Tian Syah
1999 Bandar Seri Begawan	Indonesia (INA); Hadi J. Anton Suseno	Singapore (SIN); Zhang Taiyong; Duan Yongjun	Vietnam (VIE); Le Huy; Đoàn Kiến Quốc
1999 Bandar Seri Begawan	Indonesia (INA); Hadi J. Anton Suseno	Singapore (SIN); Zhang Taiyong; Duan Yongjun	Vietnam (VIE); Vu Mamh Cuong; Bui Xuan Ha
2001 Kuala Lumpur	Singapore (SIN); Zhang Taiyong; Duan Yongjun	Singapore (SIN); Sen Yew Fai; Cai Xiaoli	Thailand (THA); Phakphoom Sanguansin; Phuchong Sanguansin
2001 Kuala Lumpur	Singapore (SIN); Zhang Taiyong; Duan Yongjun	Singapore (SIN); Sen Yew Fai; Cai Xiaoli	Indonesia (INA); Ismu Harinto; David Jacobs
2003 Hanoi	Singapore (SIN); Zhang Taiyong; Cai Xiaoli	Thailand (THA); Phuchong Sanguansin; Phakphoom Sanguansin	Vietnam (VIE); Nguyen Nam Hai; Tran Tuan Quynh
2003 Hanoi	Singapore (SIN); Zhang Taiyong; Cai Xiaoli	Thailand (THA); Phuchong Sanguansin; Phakphoom Sanguansin	Indonesia (INA); Ismu Harinto; David Jacobs
2005 Manila	Singapore (SIN); Cai Xiaoli; Yang Zi	Indonesia (INA); David Jacobs; Yon Mardiyono	Indonesia (INA); Reno Handoyo; Muhammad Hussein
2005 Manila	Singapore (SIN); Cai Xiaoli; Yang Zi	Indonesia (INA); David Jacobs; Yon Mardiyono	Vietnam (VIE); Nguyen Nam Hai; Tran Tuan Quynh
2007 Nakhon Ratchasima	Singapore (SIN); Gao Ning; Yang Zi	Indonesia (INA); Reno Handoyo; Muhammad Hussein	Indonesia (INA); David Jacobs; Yon Mardiyono
2007 Nakhon Ratchasima	Singapore (SIN); Gao Ning; Yang Zi	Indonesia (INA); Reno Handoyo; Muhammad Hussein	Malaysia (MAS); Chai Kian Beng; Muhd Shakirin Ibahim
2009 Vientiane	Vietnam (VIE); Dinh Quang Linh; Đoàn Kiến Quốc	Vietnam (VIE); Nguyen Nam Hai; Tran Tuan Quynh	Singapore (SIN); Gao Ning; Yang Zi
2009 Vientiane	Vietnam (VIE); Dinh Quang Linh; Đoàn Kiến Quốc	Vietnam (VIE); Nguyen Nam Hai; Tran Tuan Quynh	Singapore (SIN); Cai Xiaoli; Pang Xuejie
2011 Palembang/Jakarta	Singapore (SIN); Ma Liang; Pang Xuejie	Singapore (SIN); Gao Ning; Yang Zi	Philippines (PHI); Richard Gonzales; Rodel Irene Valle
2011 Palembang/Jakarta	Singapore (SIN); Ma Liang; Pang Xuejie	Singapore (SIN); Gao Ning; Yang Zi	Thailand (THA); Chaisit Chaitat; Nikom Wongsiri
2013 Naypyidaw	Not held		
2015 Singapore	Singapore (SIN); Li Hu; Gao Ning	Thailand (THA); Padasak Tanviriyavechakul; Chanakarn Udomsilp	Singapore (SIN); Clarence Chew; Chen Feng
2015 Singapore	Singapore (SIN); Li Hu; Gao Ning	Thailand (THA); Padasak Tanviriyavechakul; Chanakarn Udomsilp	Vietnam (VIE); Trần Tuấn Quỳnh; Nguyễn Anh Tú
2017 Kuala Lumpur	Singapore (SGP); Pang Xue Jie; Gao Ning	Singapore (SGP); Clarence Chew; Ethan Poh Shao Feng	Indonesia (INA); M. Bima Abdi Negara; Ficky Supit Santoso
2017 Kuala Lumpur	Singapore (SGP); Pang Xue Jie; Gao Ning	Singapore (SGP); Clarence Chew; Ethan Poh Shao Feng	Thailand (THA); Padasak Tanviriyavechakul; Supanut Wisutmaythangkoon
2019 Philippines	Vietnam (VIE); Đoàn Bá Tuấn Anh; Nguyễn Anh Tú	Singapore (SGP); Josh Chua; Pang Yew En Koen	Malaysia (MAS); Javen Choong; Amos Ling Heng
2019 Philippines	Vietnam (VIE); Đoàn Bá Tuấn Anh; Nguyễn Anh Tú	Singapore (SGP); Josh Chua; Pang Yew En Koen	Malaysia (MAS); Muhammad Ashraf Haiqal; Wong Shen
2021 Vietnam	Singapore (SGP); Clarence Chew; Ethan Poh	Philippines (PHI); Richard Gonzales; John Russel Misal	Malaysia (MAS); Javen Choong; Wong Qi Shen
2021 Vietnam	Singapore (SGP); Clarence Chew; Ethan Poh	Philippines (PHI); Richard Gonzales; John Russel Misal	Singapore (SGP); Koen Pang Yew En; Josh Chua
2023 Cambodia	Singapore (SGP); Koen Pang; Izaac Quek	Malaysia (MAS); Javeen Chong; Wong Qi Shen	Philippines (PHI); John Russel Picondo; Richard Pugoy Gonzales
2023 Cambodia	Singapore (SGP); Koen Pang; Izaac Quek	Malaysia (MAS); Javeen Chong; Wong Qi Shen	Singapore (SGP); Beh Kun Ting; Ethan Poh
2025 Thailand	Singapore (SGP); Koen Pang; Izaac Quek	Malaysia (MAS); Javeen Chong; Wong Qi Shen	Thailand (THA); Thitaphat Preechayan; Phakpoom Sanguansin
2025 Thailand	Singapore (SGP); Koen Pang; Izaac Quek	Malaysia (MAS); Javeen Chong; Wong Qi Shen	Vietnam (VIE); Đoàn Bá Tuấn Anh; Nguyễn Đức Tuân

=== Men's team ===
Games	Gold	Silver	Bronze
1959 Bangkok	South Vietnam (VNM)		
1961 Yangon		Singapore (SIN); Sen Poh Leng; Lim Wai Sheng; Poon Weng Hoe; Lim Wai Sheng	
1965 Kuala Lumpur	South Vietnam (VNM); Trần Thánh Đường; Ngô Minh Luân; Huỳnh Văn Ngọc	Cambodia (CAM); Pal Bun Thon; Yang Chho Nam; Khau Bou; Tan Serey	Thailand (THA); V. Chayanont; Patanaviranan Supachai; Surasak Kokiettaveechai
1967 Bangkok			
1969 Bangkok		Malaysia (MAL); Soong Poh Wah; Loong Ping Sum; Lim Hee Peng; Cheong Chin Cheong	
1971 Kuala Lumpur	Singapore (SIN); Yuen Chin Fatt; Tan Khoon Hong; Chia Chong Boon	Malaysia (MAL); Peong Tah Seng; Soong Poh Wah; Loong Ping Sum	
1973 Singapore	Singapore (SIN); Tan Khoon Hong; Tan Kai Kok; Chia Chong Boon	Malaysia (MAL); Soong Poh Wah; Long Ping Sum; Peong Tah Seng	South Vietnam (VNM); Vuong Chinh Hoc; Le Van Inh; Tran Tanh Duong
1975 Bangkok	Malaysia (MAL); Peong Tah Seng; Fan Sim Wai; Soong Poh Wah; Soh Eng Yip	Singapore (SIN)	
1977 Kuala Lumpur		Malaysia (MAL); Peong Tah Seng; Tay Kee; Lim Yew San; Fan Sim Wai	Singapore (SIN)
1979 Jakarta			Malaysia (MAL); Peong Tah Seng; Tay Kee; Kok Chong Fatt; Choo Jawn Hee
1979 Jakarta			Singapore (SIN)
1981 Manila	Indonesia (INA); Faisal Rachman; Gunawan Sutedja; Haryono Wong	Thailand (THA); K. Chaisak; K. Mowap; W. Chayamond	Malaysia (MAL); Peong Tah Seng; Tay Kee; Lee Kin Kee; Tan Boon Siang
1983 Singapore	Indonesia (INA); Sugiharto Sutedja; Sinyo Supit; Faisal Rachman	Malaysia (MAL); Peong Tah Seng; Lee Kin Kee; Kok Chong Fatt	Thailand (THA); Manop Kantawang; Chartchai Teekavirakit; Chayanond Wuwanich
1985 Bangkok			
1987 Jakarta	Indonesia (INA); Tony Swingly Meringgi; Sinyo Supit; Haryono Wong Tye	Thailand (THA); Manop Kantawang; Kriengkraipetch Panumas; Chartchai Teekavirakit	Malaysia (MAL); Tay Kee; Lim Chon Leong; Peong Tah Seng
1987 Jakarta	Indonesia (INA); Tony Swingly Meringgi; Sinyo Supit; Haryono Wong Tye	Thailand (THA); Manop Kantawang; Kriengkraipetch Panumas; Chartchai Teekavirakit	Singapore (SIN); Loy Soo Chew; Goh Yong Koon
1989 Kuala Lumpur			
1991 Manila			
1993 Singapore	Indonesia (INA)	Malaysia (MAS); Eng Tian Syh; Lim Chin Leong; Yong Hong Cheh; Khor Kok Seong	Thailand (THA)
1993 Singapore	Indonesia (INA)	Malaysia (MAS); Eng Tian Syh; Lim Chin Leong; Yong Hong Cheh; Khor Kok Seong	Vietnam (VIE)
1995 Chiang Mai	Indonesia (INA)	Vietnam (VIE)	Malaysia (MAS); Andy Ng Shiu Leong; Eng Tian Syh; Lim Chin Leong; Yong Hong Cheh; H'ng Kim Shan
1995 Chiang Mai	Indonesia (INA)	Vietnam (VIE)	Thailand (THA)
1997 Jakarta	Indonesia (INA)	Vietnam (VIE)	Malaysia (MAS)
1997 Jakarta	Indonesia (INA)	Vietnam (VIE)	Thailand (THA)
1999 Bandar Seri Begawan	Singapore (SIN); Sen Yew Fai; Koh Chin Guan; Duan Yong Jun; Cai Xiaoli; Zhang Tai Yong	Vietnam (VIE); Vu Manh Cuong; LE HUY; Đoàn Kiến Quốc	Indonesia (INA); AL. ARKAM; Deddy Dacosta; Hadi J. Anton Suseno; Ersan Sutanto
1999 Bandar Seri Begawan	Singapore (SIN); Sen Yew Fai; Koh Chin Guan; Duan Yong Jun; Cai Xiaoli; Zhang Tai Yong	Vietnam (VIE); Vu Manh Cuong; LE HUY; Đoàn Kiến Quốc	Malaysia (MAS); Choo Sim Guan; Ng Shui Leong; Chan Koon Wah; Eng Tian Syh
2001 Kuala Lumpur	Thailand (THA); Sanan Ariyachotima; Chaisit Chaitat; Phakphoom Sanguansin; Phuchong Sanguansin	Singapore (SIN); Raymond Sen Yew Fai; Duan Yong Jun; Cai Xiaoli; Zhang Tai Yong	Malaysia (MAS); Tan Chin; Jong Min Shing; Oh Chor Sime; Chan Koon Wah
2001 Kuala Lumpur	Thailand (THA); Sanan Ariyachotima; Chaisit Chaitat; Phakphoom Sanguansin; Phuchong Sanguansin	Singapore (SIN); Raymond Sen Yew Fai; Duan Yong Jun; Cai Xiaoli; Zhang Tai Yong	Vietnam (VIE); Vu Manh Cuong; Doan Trong Nghia; Đoàn Kiến Quốc; Tran Tuan Quynh
2003 Hanoi	Singapore (SIN); Ho Jia Ren Jason; Cai Xiaoli; Sen Yew Fai Raymond; Zhang Tai Yong	Thailand (THA); Seksak Khomkham; Phuchong Sanguansin; Phakphoom Sanguansin; Pornchai Torsutkanok; Yuttana Tubbunmee	Indonesia (INA); Reno Handoyo; Ismu Harinto; David Jacobs; Yon Mardyono; Mohamad Zainudin
2003 Hanoi	Singapore (SIN); Ho Jia Ren Jason; Cai Xiaoli; Sen Yew Fai Raymond; Zhang Tai Yong	Thailand (THA); Seksak Khomkham; Phuchong Sanguansin; Phakphoom Sanguansin; Pornchai Torsutkanok; Yuttana Tubbunmee	Vietnam (VIE); Vu Manh Cuong; Nguyen Nam Hai; Đoàn Kiến Quốc; Tran Tuan Quynh; Ho Ngoc Thuan
2005 Manila	Singapore (SIN); Cai Xiaoli; Clarence Lee Tien Hoe; Yang Zi	Vietnam (VIE); Nguyen Nam Hai; Đoàn Kiến Quốc; Tran Tuan Quynh	Indonesia (INA); Reno Handoyo; Muhammad Hussein; Yon Mardiyono
2005 Manila	Singapore (SIN); Cai Xiaoli; Clarence Lee Tien Hoe; Yang Zi	Vietnam (VIE); Nguyen Nam Hai; Đoàn Kiến Quốc; Tran Tuan Quynh	Philippines (PHI); Joseph Cruz; Ernesto Ebuen; Richard Gonzales
2007 Nakhon Ratchasima	Singapore (SIN); Jason Ho Jiaren; Gao Ning; Cai Xiaoli; Pang Xuejie; Yang Zi	Thailand (THA); Chaisit Chaitat; Phakpoom Sanguansin; Phuchong Sanguansin; Sithichok Vipawatanakul; Tanawat Vipawatanakul	Indonesia (INA); Reno Handoyo; Muhammad Hussein; David Jacobs; Yon Mardiyono
2007 Nakhon Ratchasima	Singapore (SIN); Jason Ho Jiaren; Gao Ning; Cai Xiaoli; Pang Xuejie; Yang Zi	Thailand (THA); Chaisit Chaitat; Phakpoom Sanguansin; Phuchong Sanguansin; Sithichok Vipawatanakul; Tanawat Vipawatanakul	Vietnam (VIE); Do Duc Duy; Nguyen Nam Hai; Dinh Quang Linh; Đoàn Kiến Quốc; Tran Tuan Quynh
2009 Vientiane	Singapore (SIN); Gao Ning; Cai Xiaoli; Yang Zi; Pang Xue Jie; Lim Jie Yan	Thailand (THA); Chaisit Chaitat; Phakpoom Sanguansin; Phuchong Sanguansin	Indonesia (INA); Muhammad Hussein; David Jacobs; Yon Mardiyono
2009 Vientiane	Singapore (SIN); Gao Ning; Cai Xiaoli; Yang Zi; Pang Xue Jie; Lim Jie Yan	Thailand (THA); Chaisit Chaitat; Phakpoom Sanguansin; Phuchong Sanguansin	Vietnam (VIE); Nguyen Nam Hai; Đoàn Kiến Quốc; Tran Tuan Quynh
2011 Palembang/Jakarta	Not held		
2013 Naypyidaw	Singapore (SIN); Chen Feng; Li Hu; Zhan Jian; Jie Pang Xue; Clarence Chew	Thailand (THA); Chaisit Chaitat; Suchat Pitakgulsiri; Padasak Tanviriyavechakul; Nikom Wongsiri	Malaysia (MAS); Ee Hooi Chin; Dunley Foo; Muhamad Ashraf Haiqal; Muhd Shakirin Ibrahim
2013 Naypyidaw	Singapore (SIN); Chen Feng; Li Hu; Zhan Jian; Jie Pang Xue; Clarence Chew	Thailand (THA); Chaisit Chaitat; Suchat Pitakgulsiri; Padasak Tanviriyavechakul; Nikom Wongsiri	Vietnam (VIE); Đào Duy Hoàng; Dương Văn Nam; Lê Tiến Đạt; Nguyen Van Ngoc
2015 Singapore	Singapore (SIN); Clarence Chew; Chen Feng; Li Hu; Gao Ning; Yang Zi	Vietnam (VIE); Lê Tiến Đạt; Đinh Quang Linh; Dương Văn Nam; Trần Tuấn Quỳnh; Nguyễn Anh Tú	Indonesia (INA); Akhmad Dahlan Haruri; Gilang Maulana; Gilang Ramadhan; Ficky Supit Santoso
2015 Singapore	Singapore (SIN); Clarence Chew; Chen Feng; Li Hu; Gao Ning; Yang Zi	Vietnam (VIE); Lê Tiến Đạt; Đinh Quang Linh; Dương Văn Nam; Trần Tuấn Quỳnh; Nguyễn Anh Tú	Malaysia (MAS); Wong Chun Cheun; Leong Chee Feng; Muhd Shakirin Ibrahim; Muhamad A. H.Muhamad R.
2017 Kuala Lumpur	Vietnam (VIE); Đoàn Bá Tuấn Anh; Đinh Quang Linh; Trần Tuấn Quỳnh; Nguyễn Anh Tú; Nguyễn Đức Tuân	Singapore (SGP); Ethan Poh Shao Feng; Pang Xue Jie; Gao Ning; Lucas Tan; Clarence Chew	Indonesia (INA); Donny Prasetya Aji; Deepash Anil Bhagwani; M. Bima Abdi Negara; Ficky Supit Santoso; Habibie Wahid
2017 Kuala Lumpur	Vietnam (VIE); Đoàn Bá Tuấn Anh; Đinh Quang Linh; Trần Tuấn Quỳnh; Nguyễn Anh Tú; Nguyễn Đức Tuân	Singapore (SGP); Ethan Poh Shao Feng; Pang Xue Jie; Gao Ning; Lucas Tan; Clarence Chew	Malaysia (MAS); Wong Chun Cheun; Leong Chee Feng; Muhd Shakirin Ibrahim; Choong Javen; Muhd Ashraf Haiqal Rizal
2019 Philippines	Not held		
2021 Hanoi	Thailand; Padasak Tanviriyavechakul; Pattaratorn Passara; Phakpoom Sanguansin; Sarayut Tancharoen	Malaysia; Leong Chee Feng; Javen Choong; Wong Qi Shen; Danny Ng Wann Sing	Vietnam; Đinh Anh Hoàng; Nguyễn Anh Tú; Nguyễn Đức Tuân; Đoàn Bá Tuấn Anh; Lê Đình Đức
2021 Hanoi	Thailand; Padasak Tanviriyavechakul; Pattaratorn Passara; Phakpoom Sanguansin; Sarayut Tancharoen	Malaysia; Leong Chee Feng; Javen Choong; Wong Qi Shen; Danny Ng Wann Sing	Singapore (SGP); Koen Pang Yew En; Ethan Poh Shao Feng; Clarence Chew; Joshua Chua Shao Han
2023 Cambodia	Singapore; Koen Pang; Ethan Poh; Clarence Chew Zhe Yu; Izaac Quek	Malaysia; Javen Choong; Leong Chee Feng; Wong Qi Shen	Thailand; Padasak Tanviriyavechakul; Sarayut Tancharoen; Phakpoom Sanguansin
2023 Cambodia	Singapore; Koen Pang; Ethan Poh; Clarence Chew Zhe Yu; Izaac Quek	Malaysia; Javen Choong; Leong Chee Feng; Wong Qi Shen	Vietnam; Đoàn Bá Tuấn Anh; Nguyễn Anh Tú; Nguyễn Đức Tuân
2025 Thailand	Singapore; Clarence Chew; Josh Chua; Ellsworth Le; Koen Pang; Izaac Quek	Vietnam; Đinh Anh Hoàng; Đoàn Bá Tuấn Anh; Lê Đình Đức; Nguyễn Anh Tú; Nguyễn Đức Tuân	Malaysia; Javen Choong; Im Jin Zhen; Danny Ng Wann Sing; Tey Hong Yu; Wong Qi Shen
2025 Thailand	Singapore; Clarence Chew; Josh Chua; Ellsworth Le; Koen Pang; Izaac Quek	Vietnam; Đinh Anh Hoàng; Đoàn Bá Tuấn Anh; Lê Đình Đức; Nguyễn Anh Tú; Nguyễn Đức Tuân	Philippines; Richard Gonzales; John Russel Misal; Jann Mari Nayre; Eljay Dan Tormis; Edouard Aaron Raymond Valenet

=== Women's singles ===
Games	Gold	Silver	Bronze
1961 Yangon			
1965 Kuala Lumpur	Ong Mei Mei (MAL)	Tan Sok Cheng (CAM)	Not awarded
1967 Bangkok	Peck Noi Hwoy (SIN)	Tan Kek Hiang (SIN)	Vu Tuong Oanh (VNM)
1967 Bangkok	Peck Noi Hwoy (SIN)	Tan Kek Hiang (SIN)	Chong Suk Fong (MAL)
1969 Bangkok	Peck Noi Hwoy (SIN)	Tan Kek Hiang (SIN)	Chong Suk Fong (MAL)
1969 Bangkok	Peck Noi Hwoy (SIN)	Tan Kek Hiang (SIN)	Ong Mei Mei (MAL)
1971 Kuala Lumpur	Bopha Rattanak (KHM)	Tan Sok Cheng (KHM)	Peck Noi Hwoy (SIN)
1971 Kuala Lumpur	Bopha Rattanak (KHM)	Tan Sok Cheng (KHM)	Sumalee Jusatayanond (THA)
1973 Singapore	Tan Sok Hong (MAL)	Tan Sok Cheng (KHM)	Bopha Rattanak (KHM)
1973 Singapore	Tan Sok Hong (MAL)	Tan Sok Cheng (KHM)	Peck Noi Hwoy (SIN)
1975 Bangkok	Tan Sok Hong (MAL)	Lim Guat Hoon (MAL)	Ma Kyin Win (BIR)
1975 Bangkok	Tan Sok Hong (MAL)	Lim Guat Hoon (MAL)	Aye Win (BIR)
1977 Kuala Lumpur	Loysawai Patcharin (THA)	Liliana Wibisono (INA)	Carla Tedjasukmana (INA)
1977 Kuala Lumpur	Loysawai Patcharin (THA)	Liliana Wibisono (INA)	Tan Sok Hong (MAL)
1979 Jakarta	Loysawai Patcharin (THA)	Chong Suk Fong (MAL)	Ma Kyin Win (BIR)
1979 Jakarta	Loysawai Patcharin (THA)	Chong Suk Fong (MAL)	Leow Hock Moi (SIN)
1981 Manila	Diana Wuisan (INA)	Carla Tedjasukmana (INA)	Loysawai Patcharin (THA)
1981 Manila	Diana Wuisan (INA)	Carla Tedjasukmana (INA)	Goh Shwu Fang (MAL)
1983 Singapore	Loysawai Patcharin (THA)	Diana Wuisan (INA)	Leow Hock Moi (SIN)
1983 Singapore	Loysawai Patcharin (THA)	Diana Wuisan (INA)	Ladda Kumuthpongpanich (THA)
1985 Bangkok	Kim May Wong Patricia (SIN)	Goh Shwu Fang (MAL)	Carla Tedjasukmana (THA)
1985 Bangkok	Kim May Wong Patricia (SIN)	Goh Shwu Fang (MAL)	Ancha Apiwatanapan (THA)
1987 Jakarta	Rossy Pratiwi Dipoyanti (INA)	Kim May Wong Patricia (SIN)	Chanida Khendoknoi (THA)
1987 Jakarta	Rossy Pratiwi Dipoyanti (INA)	Kim May Wong Patricia (SIN)	Suwaporn Prapkutikul (THA)
1989 Kuala Lumpur	Leong Mee Wan (MAS)	Rossy Pratiwi Dipoyanti (INA)	Kim May Wong Patricia (SIN)
1989 Kuala Lumpur	Leong Mee Wan (MAS)	Rossy Pratiwi Dipoyanti (INA)	Kanitthanee Meesawat (THA)
1991 Manila	Rossy Pratiwi Dipoyanti (INA)	Nhan Vi Quan (VIE)	Joan Rae Sanchez (PHI)
1991 Manila	Rossy Pratiwi Dipoyanti (INA)	Nhan Vi Quan (VIE)	Phua Bee Sim (MAS)
1993 Singapore	Rossy Pratiwi Dipoyanti (INA)	Ngô Thu Thuỷ (VIE)	Trần Thu Hà (VIE)
1993 Singapore	Rossy Pratiwi Dipoyanti (INA)	Ngô Thu Thuỷ (VIE)	Putri Hasibuan (INA)
1995 Chiang Mai	Jing Junhong (SIN)	Rossy Pratiwi Dipoyanti (INA)	Thailand (THA)
1995 Chiang Mai	Jing Junhong (SIN)	Rossy Pratiwi Dipoyanti (INA)	Vietnam (VIE)
1997 Jakarta	Jing Junhong (SIN)	Rossy Pratiwi Dipoyanti (INA)	Tan Paey Fern (SIN)
1997 Jakarta	Jing Junhong (SIN)	Rossy Pratiwi Dipoyanti (INA)	Nguyễn Mai Thy (VIE)
1999 Bandar Seri Begawan	Li Jiawei (SIN)	Nanthana Komwong (THA)	Jing Junhong (SIN)
1999 Bandar Seri Begawan	Li Jiawei (SIN)	Nanthana Komwong (THA)	Anisara Muangsuk (THA)
2001 Kuala Lumpur	Li Jiawei (SIN)	Nanthana Komwong (THA)	Jing Junhong (SIN)
2001 Kuala Lumpur	Li Jiawei (SIN)	Nanthana Komwong (THA)	Anisara Muangsuk (THA)
2003 Hanoi	Li Jiawei (SIN)	Zhang Xueling (SIN)	Beh Lee Wei (MAS)
2003 Hanoi	Li Jiawei (SIN)	Zhang Xueling (SIN)	Nanthana Komwong (THA)
2005 Manila	Zhang Xueling (SIN)	Li Jiawei (SIN)	Nanthana Komwong (THA)
2005 Manila	Zhang Xueling (SIN)	Li Jiawei (SIN)	Christine Ferliana (INA)
2007 Nakhon Ratchasima	Wang Yuegu (SIN)	Ng Sock Khim (MAS)	Nanthana Komwong (THA)
2007 Nakhon Ratchasima	Wang Yuegu (SIN)	Ng Sock Khim (MAS)	Anisara Muangsuk (THA)
2009 Vientiane	Feng Tianwei (SIN)	Wang Yuegu (SIN)	Beh Lee Wei (MAS)
2009 Vientiane	Feng Tianwei (SIN)	Wang Yuegu (SIN)	Nanthana Komwong (THA)
2011 Palembang/Jakarta	Feng Tianwei (SIN)	Li Siyun Isabelle (SIN)	Christine Ferliana (INA)
2011 Palembang/Jakarta	Feng Tianwei (SIN)	Li Siyun Isabelle (SIN)	Mai Hoàng Mỹ Trang (VIE)
2013 Naypyitaw	Yu Mengyu (SIN)	Li Siyun Isabelle (SIN)	Beh Lee Wei (MAS)
2013 Naypyitaw	Yu Mengyu (SIN)	Li Siyun Isabelle (SIN)	Mai Hoàng Mỹ Trang (VIE)
2015 Singapore	Suthasini Sawettabut (THA)	Ng Sock Khim (MAS)	Nguyễn Thị Nga (VIE)
2015 Singapore	Suthasini Sawettabut (THA)	Ng Sock Khim (MAS)	Mai Hoàng Mỹ Trang (VIE)
2017 Kuala Lumpur	Feng Tianwei (SGP)	Zhou Yihan (SGP)	Nanthana Komwong (THA)
2017 Kuala Lumpur	Feng Tianwei (SGP)	Zhou Yihan (SGP)	Suthasini Sawettabut (THA)
2019 Philippines	Lin Ye (SGP)	Feng Tianwei (SGP)	Nanthana Komwong (THA)
2019 Philippines	Lin Ye (SGP)	Feng Tianwei (SGP)	Suthasini Sawettabut (THA)
2021 Hanoi	Orawan Paranang (THA)	Suthasini Sawettabut (THA)	Ho Ying (MAS)
2021 Hanoi	Orawan Paranang (THA)	Suthasini Sawettabut (THA)	Zeng Jian (SGP)
2023 Cambodia	Zeng Jian; Singapore	Suthasini Sawettabut; Thailand	Orawan Paranang; Thailand
2023 Cambodia	Zeng Jian; Singapore	Suthasini Sawettabut; Thailand	Nguyễn Khoa Diệu Khánh; Vietnam
2025 Thailand	Suthasini Sawettabut; Thailand	Orawan Paranang; Thailand	Alice Chang Li Sian; Malaysia
2025 Thailand	Suthasini Sawettabut; Thailand	Orawan Paranang; Thailand	Ser Lin Qian; Singapore

=== Women's doubles ===
Games	Gold	Silver	Bronze
1965 Kuala Lumpur	Malaysia (MAL); Ong Mei Mei; Ooi Cheow Seah	South Vietnam (VNM); Vũ Tường Oanh; Vương Mỹ Hà	Cambodia (CAM); Bopha Rattanak; Tan Sok Cheng
1967 Bangkok			Malaysia (MAL); Chong Suk Fong; Fong Kwee Chin
1967 Bangkok			Singapore (SIN); Tan Kek Hiang; Peck Noi Hwoy
1969 Bangkok	Singapore (SIN); Tan Kek Hiang; Peck Noi Hwoy		
1971 Kuala Lumpur	Myanmar (MYA); Bopha Rattanak; Tan Sok Cheng	Malaysia (MAL); Tan Sok Hong; Cheng Seow Ying	Singapore (SIN); Peck Noi Huay; Tan Kek Hiang
1971 Kuala Lumpur	Myanmar (MYA); Bopha Rattanak; Tan Sok Cheng	Malaysia (MAL); Tan Sok Hong; Cheng Seow Ying	Thailand (THA); Pakatip Seematrung; Lavan Wongpansawad
1973 Singapore	Singapore (SIN); Peck Noi Hwoy; Tan Kek Hiang	Thailand (THA); Sumalee Jusatayanond; Malika B.	Malaysia (MAL); Ong Yong Luan; Yap Ai Suan
1973 Singapore	Singapore (SIN); Peck Noi Hwoy; Tan Kek Hiang	Thailand (THA); Sumalee Jusatayanond; Malika B.	Thailand (THA); Lavad Wongpansawad; Pakhatip L.
1975 Bangkok	Singapore (SIN); Peck Hoi Hway; Tan Kek Hiang		Malaysia (MAL)
1975 Bangkok	Singapore (SIN); Peck Hoi Hway; Tan Kek Hiang		Malaysia (MAL)
1977 Kuala Lumpur		Malaysia (MAL); Tan Sok Hong; Kueh Mui Huang	
1979 Jakarta	Malaysia (MAL); Tan Sok Hong; Chong Suk Fong	Thailand (THA); Patcharin Loysawai; Ladda Kumuthpongpanich	Indonesia (INA); Carla Tedjasukmana; Diana Wuisan
1981 Manila	Thailand (THA); Patcharin Loysawai; Ladda Kumuthpongpanich	Indonesia (INA); Diana Wuisan; Carla Tedjasukmana	Indonesia (INA); Lilik Winarni; Dewi
1981 Manila	Thailand (THA); Patcharin Loysawai; Ladda Kumuthpongpanich	Indonesia (INA); Diana Wuisan; Carla Tedjasukmana	Malaysia (MAL); Goh Shwu Fang; Yip Pau Cheng
1983 Singapore	Indonesia (INA); Diana Wuisan; Carla Tejasukmana	Thailand (THA); Ladda Kumuthpongpanich; Loysawai Patcharin	Malaysia (MAL); Leong Mee Wan; Loke Wai Har
1983 Singapore	Indonesia (INA); Diana Wuisan; Carla Tejasukmana	Thailand (THA); Ladda Kumuthpongpanich; Loysawai Patcharin	Singapore (SGP); Leow Hock Moi; Patricia Kim
1985 Bangkok	Thailand (THA); Kwanta Kumutpongpanich; Chanida Khendoknoi	Indonesia (INA); Evy Sumendap; Chandra Dewi	Philippines (PHI); Luisa Espino; Emelita Bauto
1985 Bangkok	Thailand (THA); Kwanta Kumutpongpanich; Chanida Khendoknoi	Indonesia (INA); Evy Sumendap; Chandra Dewi	Indonesia (INA); Carla Tedjasukmana; Ellyana Effendy
1987 Jakarta	Malaysia (MAL); Lau Wai Cheng; Leong Mee Wan	Indonesia (INA); Rossy Pratiwi Dipoyanti; Lydia Waluyan	Indonesia (INA); Mulatsih; Evi Sumendap
1987 Jakarta	Malaysia (MAL); Lau Wai Cheng; Leong Mee Wan	Indonesia (INA); Rossy Pratiwi Dipoyanti; Lydia Waluyan	Thailand (THA); Chanida Khendoknoi; Suwaporn Prapkutikul
1989 Kuala Lumpur	Indonesia (INA); Rossy Pratiwi Dipoyanti; Evy Sumendap	Indonesia (INA); Ling Ling Agustin; Mulatsih	Malaysia (MAS); Leong Mee Wan; Lau Wai Cheng
1989 Kuala Lumpur	Indonesia (INA); Rossy Pratiwi Dipoyanti; Evy Sumendap	Indonesia (INA); Ling Ling Agustin; Mulatsih	Thailand (THA); Kanitthanee Meesawat; Chanida Khendoknoi
1991 Manila	Malaysia (MAS); Phua Bee Sim; Chong Choi Thing	Indonesia (INA); Rossy Pratiwi Dipoyanti; Ling Ling Agustin	Singapore (SIN); Tan Ah Tee; Patricia Kim
1991 Manila	Malaysia (MAS); Phua Bee Sim; Chong Choi Thing	Indonesia (INA); Rossy Pratiwi Dipoyanti; Ling Ling Agustin	Indonesia (INA); Esther Megasari; Mulatsih
1993 Singapore	Indonesia (INA); Ling Ling Agustin; Mulatsih	Indonesia (INA); Rossy Pratiwi Dipoyanti; Putri Hasibuan	Malaysia (MAS); Phua Bee Sim; Chong Choi Thing
1993 Singapore	Indonesia (INA); Ling Ling Agustin; Mulatsih	Indonesia (INA); Rossy Pratiwi Dipoyanti; Putri Hasibuan	Singapore (SIN); Koh Li Ping; Tan Paey Fern
1995 Chiang Mai	Indonesia (INA); Rossy Pratiwi Dipoyanti; Mulatsih	Singapore (SIN); Jing Jun Hong	Malaysia (MAS); Phua Bee Sim; Chong Choi Thing
1995 Chiang Mai	Indonesia (INA); Rossy Pratiwi Dipoyanti; Mulatsih	Singapore (SIN); Jing Jun Hong	Thailand (THA)
1997 Jakarta	Indonesia (INA); Putri Septi Naulina Hasibuan; Fauziah Yulianti	Indonesia (INA); Rossy Pratiwi Dipoyanti; Mulatsih	Singapore (SIN); Tan Pay Fern; Jing Junhong
1997 Jakarta	Indonesia (INA); Putri Septi Naulina Hasibuan; Fauziah Yulianti	Indonesia (INA); Rossy Pratiwi Dipoyanti; Mulatsih	Vietnam (VIE); Ngo Thu Thuy; Tran Le Phuong Linh
1999 Bandar Seri Begawan	Singapore (SIN); Jing Junhong; Li Jiawei	Indonesia (INA); Putri Septi Naulina Hasibuan; Fauziah Yulianti	Indonesia (INA); Christine Ferliana; Rossy Pratiwi Dipoyanti
1999 Bandar Seri Begawan	Singapore (SIN); Jing Junhong; Li Jiawei	Indonesia (INA); Putri Septi Naulina Hasibuan; Fauziah Yulianti	Thailand (THA); Nanthana Komwong; Anisara Muangsuk
2001 Kuala Lumpur	Singapore (SIN); Jing Junhong; Li Jiawei	Indonesia (INA); Putri Septi Naulina Hasibuan; Fauziah Yulianti	Indonesia (INA); Rossy Pratiwi Dipoyanti; Christine Ferliana
2001 Kuala Lumpur	Singapore (SIN); Jing Junhong; Li Jiawei	Indonesia (INA); Putri Septi Naulina Hasibuan; Fauziah Yulianti	Malaysia (MAS); Beh Lee Fong; Beh Lee Wei
2003 Hanoi	Singapore (SIN); Jing Junhong; Li Jiawei	Singapore (SIN); Zhang Xueling; Tan Paey Fern	Indonesia (INA); Christine Ferliana; Ceria Nilasari Jusma
2003 Hanoi	Singapore (SIN); Jing Junhong; Li Jiawei	Singapore (SIN); Zhang Xueling; Tan Paey Fern	Thailand (THA); Nanthana Komwong; Anisara Muangsuk
2005 Manila	Singapore (SIN); Li Jiawei; Zhang Xueling	Indonesia (INA); Christine Ferliana; Ceria Nilasari Jusma	Thailand (THA); Nanthana Komwong; Anisara Muangsuk
2005 Manila	Singapore (SIN); Li Jiawei; Zhang Xueling	Indonesia (INA); Christine Ferliana; Ceria Nilasari Jusma	Singapore (SIN); Tan Paey Fern; Yan Xu
2007 Nakhon Ratchasima	Singapore (SIN); Sun Beibei; Yu Mengyu	Singapore (SIN); Li Jiawei; Wang Yuegu	Indonesia (INA); Christine Ferliana; Ceria Nilasari Jusma
2007 Nakhon Ratchasima	Singapore (SIN); Sun Beibei; Yu Mengyu	Singapore (SIN); Li Jiawei; Wang Yuegu	Thailand (THA); Nanthana Komwong; Anisara Muangsuk
2009 Vientiane	Singapore (SIN); Sun Beibei; Yu Mengyu	Singapore (SIN); Feng Tianwei; Wang Yuegu	Thailand (THA); Nanthana Komwong; Anisara Muangsuk
2009 Vientiane	Singapore (SIN); Sun Beibei; Yu Mengyu	Singapore (SIN); Feng Tianwei; Wang Yuegu	Vietnam (VIE); Mai Xuan Hang; Mai Hoang My Trang
2011 Palembang/Jakarta	Singapore (SIN); Sun Beibei; Feng Tianwei	Thailand (THA); Nanthana Komwong; Anisara Muangsuk	Indonesia (INA); Christine Ferliana; Fauziah Yuliyanti
2011 Palembang/Jakarta	Singapore (SIN); Sun Beibei; Feng Tianwei	Thailand (THA); Nanthana Komwong; Anisara Muangsuk	Vietnam (VIE); Nguyen Thi Viet Linh; Mai Hoang My Trang
2013 Naypyidaw	Not held		
2015 Singapore	Singapore (SIN); Lin Ye; Zhou Yihan	Singapore (SIN); Yu Mengyu; Feng Tianwei	Malaysia (MAS); Ho Ying; Lee Rou You
2015 Singapore	Singapore (SIN); Lin Ye; Zhou Yihan	Singapore (SIN); Yu Mengyu; Feng Tianwei	Thailand (THA); Nanthana Komwong; Suthasini Sawettabut
2017 Kuala Lumpur	Singapore (SGP); Yu Mengyu; Feng Tianwei	Singapore (SGP); Lin Ye; Zhou Yihan	Indonesia (INA); Gustin Dwijayanti; Lilis Indriani
2017 Kuala Lumpur	Singapore (SGP); Yu Mengyu; Feng Tianwei	Singapore (SGP); Lin Ye; Zhou Yihan	Vietnam (VIE); Nguyễn Thị Nga; Mai Hoàng Mỹ Trang
2019 Philippines	Thailand (THA); Orawan Paranang; Suthasini Sawettabut	Thailand (THA); Nanthana Komwong; Jinnipa Sawettabut	Singapore (SGP); Feng Tianwei; Lin Ye
2019 Philippines	Thailand (THA); Orawan Paranang; Suthasini Sawettabut	Thailand (THA); Nanthana Komwong; Jinnipa Sawettabut	Singapore (SGP); Goi Rui Xuan; Wong Xin Ru
2021 Hanoi	Thailand (THA); Orawan Paranang; Suthasini Sawettabut	Singapore (SGP); Zeng Jian; Zhou Jingyi	Malaysia (MAS); Karen Lyne Anak Dick; Ho Ying
2021 Hanoi	Thailand (THA); Orawan Paranang; Suthasini Sawettabut	Singapore (SGP); Zeng Jian; Zhou Jingyi	Vietnam (VIE); Nguyễn Thị Nga; Trần Mai Ngọc
2023 Cambodia	Thailand; Orawan Paranang; Suthasini Sawettabut	Singapore; Wong Xin Ru; Zhou Jingyi	Malaysia; Alice Chang Li Sian; Im Li Ying
2023 Cambodia	Thailand; Orawan Paranang; Suthasini Sawettabut	Singapore; Wong Xin Ru; Zhou Jingyi	Singapore; Ser Lin Qian; Goi Rui Xuan
2025 Thailand	Thailand; Orawan Paranang; Suthasini Sawettabut	Thailand; Tamolwan Khetkhuan; Jinnipa Sawettabut	Malaysia; Karen Lyne Dick; Tee Ai Xin
2025 Thailand	Thailand; Orawan Paranang; Suthasini Sawettabut	Thailand; Tamolwan Khetkhuan; Jinnipa Sawettabut	Singapore; Loy Ming Ying; Ser Lin Qian

=== Women's team ===
Games	Gold	Silver	Bronze
1959 Kuala Lumpur			
1961 Kuala Lumpur			
1965 Kuala Lumpur		Malaysia (MAL)	
1967 Bangkok		Malaysia (MAL); Chong Suk Fong; Lim Guat Hoon; Fong Kwee Chin; Leong Sweet Wan	
1969 Bangkok	Malaysia (MAL)	Singapore (SIN); Tan Kek Hiang; Peck Noi Hwoy; Leow Choo Whatt; Toh Chuwe Gim	
1971 Kuala Lumpur		Malaysia (MAL); Tan Lee Mei; Tan Sok Hong; Lee Hong Eng; Cheng Seow Ying	Singapore (SIN); Peck Noi Huay; Tan Kek Hiang
1973 Singapore	Khmer Republic (KHM); Boppha Rattanak; Tan Soe; Tong Sauv Luyen	Thailand (THA); Sumalee Jusatayanond; Lavad Wongpansawad; Pakhatip L.	Singapore (SIN); Peck Noi Hwoy; Tan Kek Hiang; Yap Ai Suan
1975 Bangkok		Singapore (SIN)	Malaysia (MAL); Tan Sok Hong; Lim Guat Hoon; Lee Hong Eng; Yeong Yake Keng
1977 Kuala Lumpur			Malaysia (MAL); Tan Sok Hong; Mah Kooi Choo; Teh Pek Ai; Kueh Mui Huang
1979 Jakarta			Malaysia (MAL); Yong Yoke Peng; Yip Pau Cheng; Tan Sok Hong
1979 Jakarta			Singapore (SIN)
1981 Manila	Thailand (THA); Ladda Kumuchpongpanich; Patcharin Loysawai	Indonesia (INA); Diana Wuisan; Carla Tedjasukmana; Lilik Winarni	Singapore (SIN); Goh Chong Mei; Lim Gek Hua; Kim Mein Wong
1983 Singapore	Indonesia (INA); Diana Wuisan; Lilik Winarni; Carla Tejakusuma	Thailand (THA); Loysawai Patcharin; Ladda Kumuthpongpanich; Supawadel Pilsuwan	Singapore (SGP); Leow Hock Moi; Patricia Kim; Tan Ah Tee
1985 Bangkok	Singapore (SIN)		
1987 Jakarta	Singapore (SIN); Patricia Kim; Koh Li Ping; Tan Ah Tee	Indonesia (INA); Mulatsih; Rossy Pratiwi Dipoyanti; Lidya Wayulan	Malaysia (MAL); Lau Wai Cheng; Tan Ah Tee; Leong Mee Wan
1987 Jakarta	Singapore (SIN); Patricia Kim; Koh Li Ping; Tan Ah Tee	Indonesia (INA); Mulatsih; Rossy Pratiwi Dipoyanti; Lidya Wayulan	Thailand (THA); Chanida Khendoknoi; Suwaporn Prapkutikul
1989 Kuala Lumpur	Indonesia (INA)		Singapore (SIN)
1991 Manila	Vietnam (VIE); Nhan Vi Quan; Tran Thu Ha	Indonesia (INA); Rossy Pratiwi Dipoyanti; Ling Ling Agustin	Singapore (SIN)
1993 Singapore	Indonesia (INA)	Malaysia (MAS); Phua Bee Sim; Chong Choi Thing	Singapore (SIN)
1995 Chiang Mai	Indonesia (INA)	Thailand (THA)	Singapore (SIN)
1995 Chiang Mai	Indonesia (INA)	Thailand (THA)	Vietnam (VIE)
1997 Jakarta	Indonesia (INA)	Vietnam (VIE)	Singapore (SIN); Jing Junhong; Lau Yu Han; Koh Li Ping; Tan Paey Fern
1997 Jakarta	Indonesia (INA)	Vietnam (VIE)	Thailand (THA)
1999 Bandar Seri Begawan	Singapore (SIN); Tan Paey Fern; Lee Su Hui; Jing Junhong; Li Jiawei	Thailand (THA); Pornsri Ariyachotima; Nanthana Komwong; Anisara Muangsuk; Tidaporn Vongboon; Suttilux Rattanaprayoon	Indonesia (INA); Christine Ferliana; Rossy Pratiwi Dipoyanti; Putri Septi Naulina Hasibuan; Ceria Nilasari Jusma; Fauziah Yulianti
1999 Bandar Seri Begawan	Singapore (SIN); Tan Paey Fern; Lee Su Hui; Jing Junhong; Li Jiawei	Thailand (THA); Pornsri Ariyachotima; Nanthana Komwong; Anisara Muangsuk; Tidaporn Vongboon; Suttilux Rattanaprayoon	Vietnam (VIE); Tran Le Phuong Linh; Ngo Thu Thuy; Nguyen Mai Thy; Nguyen Ngoc Uyen
2001 Kuala Lumpur	Singapore (SIN); Tan Paey Fern; Jing Junhong; Zhang Xueling; Li Jiawei	Thailand (THA); Pornsri Ariyachotima; Nanthana Komwong; Anisara Muangsuk; Tidaporn Vongboon	Malaysia (MAS); Beh Lee Fong; Beh Lee Wei; Ng Sock Khim
2001 Kuala Lumpur	Singapore (SIN); Tan Paey Fern; Jing Junhong; Zhang Xueling; Li Jiawei	Thailand (THA); Pornsri Ariyachotima; Nanthana Komwong; Anisara Muangsuk; Tidaporn Vongboon	Vietnam (VIE); Tran Le Phuong Linh; Luong Thi Tam; Ngo Thu Thuy; Nguyen Mai Thy
2003 Hanoi	Singapore (SIN); Tan Paey Fern; Jing Junhong; Zhang Xueling; Li Jiawei; Yan Xu	Myanmar (MYA); Soe Mya Mya Ayeei; Ei Ei Myo; Tin Tin Than; Hlaing Su Yin; Thwe Thwe Yu	Indonesia (INA); Christine Ferliana; Ceria Nilasari Jusma; Istiyani Lindawati; Ruri Raung; Septy Diah Susiloningrum
2003 Hanoi	Singapore (SIN); Tan Paey Fern; Jing Junhong; Zhang Xueling; Li Jiawei; Yan Xu	Myanmar (MYA); Soe Mya Mya Ayeei; Ei Ei Myo; Tin Tin Than; Hlaing Su Yin; Thwe Thwe Yu	Thailand (THA); Nanthana Komwong; Jongkon Kaewsalai; Anisara Muangsuk; Suttilux Rattanaprayoon; Tidaporn Vongboon
2005 Manila	Singapore (SIN); Tan Paey Fern; Li Jiawei; Zhang Xueling	Thailand (THA); Nanthana Komwong; Anisara Muangsuk; Suttilux Rattanaprayoon	Indonesia (INA); Christine Ferliana; Ceria Nilasari Jusma; Istiyanti Lindawati
2005 Manila	Singapore (SIN); Tan Paey Fern; Li Jiawei; Zhang Xueling	Thailand (THA); Nanthana Komwong; Anisara Muangsuk; Suttilux Rattanaprayoon	Myanmar (MYA); Aye Lu; Ei Ei Myo; Zin Myat Phyu
2007 Nakhon Ratchasima	Singapore (SIN); Sun Beibei; Tan Paey Fern; Li Jiawei; Yu Mengyu; Wang Yuegu	Thailand (THA); Nanthana Komwong; Anisara Muangsuk; Suttilux Rattanaprayoon; Priyakan Triampo; Tidaporn Vongboon	Malaysia (MAS); Gam Gaik Ding; Chiu Soo Jiin; Ng Sock Khim; Beh Lee Wei
2007 Nakhon Ratchasima	Singapore (SIN); Sun Beibei; Tan Paey Fern; Li Jiawei; Yu Mengyu; Wang Yuegu	Thailand (THA); Nanthana Komwong; Anisara Muangsuk; Suttilux Rattanaprayoon; Priyakan Triampo; Tidaporn Vongboon	Vietnam (VIE); Vu Thi Ha; Mai Xuan Hang; Pham Thi Thien Kim; Luong Thi Tam; Mai Hoang My Trang
2009 Vientiane	Singapore (SIN); Sun Beibei; Feng Tianwei; Wang Yuegu	Thailand (THA); Nanthana Komwong; Anisara Muangsuk; Suthasini Sawettabut	Malaysia (MAS); Chiu Soo Jiin; Fan Xiao Jun; Beh Lee Wei
2009 Vientiane	Singapore (SIN); Sun Beibei; Feng Tianwei; Wang Yuegu	Thailand (THA); Nanthana Komwong; Anisara Muangsuk; Suthasini Sawettabut	Vietnam (VIE); Mai Xuan Hang; Luong Thi Tam; Mai Hoang My Trang
2011 Palembang/Jakarta	Not held		
2013 Naypyidaw	Singapore (SIN); Hwee Yee Herng; Yu Mengyu; Isabelle Li Siyun; Lin Ye; Zhou Yihan	Thailand (THA); Tamolwan Khetkhuan; Nanthana Komwong; Anisara Muangsuk; Piyaporn Pannak	Malaysia (MAS); Beh Lee Wei; Angeline Tang An Qi; Ho Ying; Lee Rou You
2013 Naypyidaw	Singapore (SIN); Hwee Yee Herng; Yu Mengyu; Isabelle Li Siyun; Lin Ye; Zhou Yihan	Thailand (THA); Tamolwan Khetkhuan; Nanthana Komwong; Anisara Muangsuk; Piyaporn Pannak	Vietnam (VIE); Phan Hoàng Tường Giang; Nguyen The Viet Linh; Nguyễn Thị Nga; Mai Hoàng Mỹ Trang
2015 Singapore	Singapore (SIN); Li Si Yun Isabelle; Yu Mengyu; Feng Tianwei; Lin Ye; Zhou Yihan	Thailand (THA); Tamolwan Khetkhuan; Nanthana Komwong; Piyaporn Pannak; Orawan Paranang; Suthasini Sawettabut	Malaysia (MAS); Ng Sock Khim; Angeline Tang An Qi; Ho Ying; Lee Rou You
2015 Singapore	Singapore (SIN); Li Si Yun Isabelle; Yu Mengyu; Feng Tianwei; Lin Ye; Zhou Yihan	Thailand (THA); Tamolwan Khetkhuan; Nanthana Komwong; Piyaporn Pannak; Orawan Paranang; Suthasini Sawettabut	Vietnam (VIE); Phan Hoàng Tường Giang; Vũ Thị Hà; Pham Thi Thien Kim; Nguyễn Thị Nga; Mai Hoàng Mỹ Trang
2017 Kuala Lumpur	Singapore (SGP); Yee Herng Hwee; Yu Mengyu; Feng Tianwei; Lin Ye; Zhou Yihan	Thailand (THA); Tamolwan Khetkhuan; Nanthana Komwong; Orawan Paranang; Jinnipa Sawettabut; Suthasini Sawettabut	Indonesia (INA); Hani Tri Azhari; Gustin Dwijayanti; Kharisma Nur Hawwa; Lilis Indriani; Novita Oktariyani
2017 Kuala Lumpur	Singapore (SGP); Yee Herng Hwee; Yu Mengyu; Feng Tianwei; Lin Ye; Zhou Yihan	Thailand (THA); Tamolwan Khetkhuan; Nanthana Komwong; Orawan Paranang; Jinnipa Sawettabut; Suthasini Sawettabut	Malaysia (MAS); Ng Sock Khim; Ting Hie Phin; Alice Chang Li Sian; Lee Rou You; Ho Ying
2019 Philippines	Not held		
2021 Hanoi	Thailand; Orawan Paranang; Jinnipa Sawettabut; Suthasini Sawettabut; Wanwisa Aueawiriyayothin	Singapore; Goi Rui Xuan; Wong Xin Ru; Zeng Jian; Zhou Jingyi	Malaysia; Alice Li Sian Chang; Karen Lyne Anak Dick; Ho Ying; Tee Ai Xin
2021 Hanoi	Thailand; Orawan Paranang; Jinnipa Sawettabut; Suthasini Sawettabut; Wanwisa Aueawiriyayothin	Singapore; Goi Rui Xuan; Wong Xin Ru; Zeng Jian; Zhou Jingyi	Vietnam; Bùi Ngọc Lan; Nguyễn Khoa Diệu Khánh; Nguyễn Thị Nga; Vũ Hoài Thanh
2023 Cambodia	Thailand; Orawan Paranang; Suthasini Sawettabut; Jinnipa Sawettabut	Malaysia; Karen Lyne Dick; Alice Chang Li Sian; Ho Ying	Singapore; Goi Rui Xuan; Ser Lin Qian; Zhou Jingyi
2023 Cambodia	Thailand; Orawan Paranang; Suthasini Sawettabut; Jinnipa Sawettabut	Malaysia; Karen Lyne Dick; Alice Chang Li Sian; Ho Ying	Vietnam; Nguyễn Khoa Diệu Khánh; Nguyễn Thị Nga; Trần Mai Ngọc
2025 Thailand	Thailand; Wanwisa Aueawiriyayothin; Tamolwan Khetkhuan; Orawan Paranang; Jinnipa Sawettabut; Suthasini Sawettabut	Singapore; Chloe Lai Neng Huen; Loy Ming Ying; Ser Lin Qian; Tan Zhao Yun; Zeng Jian	Malaysia; Im Li Ying; Alice Chang Li Sian; Karen Lyne Dick; Ho Ying; Tee Ai Xin
2025 Thailand	Thailand; Wanwisa Aueawiriyayothin; Tamolwan Khetkhuan; Orawan Paranang; Jinnipa Sawettabut; Suthasini Sawettabut	Singapore; Chloe Lai Neng Huen; Loy Ming Ying; Ser Lin Qian; Tan Zhao Yun; Zeng Jian	Philippines; Sendrina Andrea Balatbat; Kheith Rhynne Cruz; Emy Rose Dael; Rose Jean Fadol; Angelou Joyce Laude

=== Mixed doubles ===
Games	Gold	Silver	Bronze
1965 Kuala Lumpur			Malaysia (MAL); Lee Mun Chew; Ong Mei Mei
1967 Bangkok	Malaysia (MAL); Lim Hee Peng; Chong Suk Fong		Singapore (SIN); Tan Khoon Hong; Tan Kek Hiang
1969 Bangkok	Malaysia (MAL); Lim Hee Peng	Malaysia (MAL); Soong Poh Wah	
1971 Kuala Lumpur	Singapore (SIN); Tan Khoon Hong; Peck Noi Huay		
1973 Singapore	Thailand (THA); Preechan S. Sumalee Jusatayanond	Khmer Republic (KHM); Tek Hanh Thi; Tan Sock Cheng	Malaysia (MAL); Peong Tah Seng; Tan Sok Hong
1973 Singapore	Thailand (THA); Preechan S. Sumalee Jusatayanond	Khmer Republic (KHM); Tek Hanh Thi; Tan Sock Cheng	Singapore (SIN); Chia Chong Boon; Tan Kek Hiang
1975 Bangkok	Malaysia (MAL); Peong Tah Seng; Tan Sok Hong	Malaysia (MAL); Fan Sim Wai; Lim Guat Hoon	Singapore (SIN)
1975 Bangkok	Malaysia (MAL); Peong Tah Seng; Tan Sok Hong	Malaysia (MAL); Fan Sim Wai; Lim Guat Hoon	Singapore (SIN)
1977 Kuala Lumpur			Malaysia (MAL); Peong Tah Seng; Tan Sok Hong
1979 Jakarta			Malaysia (MAL); Tay Kee; Tan Sok Hong
1981 Manila	Indonesia (INA); Gunawan Sutedja; Diana Wuisan	Indonesia (INA); Haryono Wong; Lilik Winarni	Malaysia (MAL); Peong Tah Seng; Goh Shwu Fang
1981 Manila	Indonesia (INA); Gunawan Sutedja; Diana Wuisan	Indonesia (INA); Haryono Wong; Lilik Winarni	Thailand (THA); Chayanand Wuwanich; Patcharin Loysawai
1983 Singapore	Indonesia (INA); Haryono Wong; Lilik Winarni	Indonesia (INA); Faisal Rachman; Carla Tejasukmana	Malaysia (MAL); Peong Tah Seng; Sim Khooi Lan
1983 Singapore	Indonesia (INA); Haryono Wong; Lilik Winarni	Indonesia (INA); Faisal Rachman; Carla Tejasukmana	Thailand (THA); Manop Kantawang; Loysawai Patcharin
1985 Bangkok			Malaysia (MAL); Peong Tah Seng; Tan Ai Wah
1985 Bangkok			Singapore (SIN); Loy Soo Cheow; Patricia Kim
1987 Jakarta	Indonesia (INA)		Malaysia (MAL); Tay Kee; Leong Mee Wan
1987 Jakarta	Indonesia (INA)		Singapore (SIN); Loy Soo Chew; Patricia Kim
1989 Kuala Lumpur	Singapore (SIN); Loy Soo Han; Koh Li Ping		Indonesia (INA)
1989 Kuala Lumpur	Singapore (SIN); Loy Soo Han; Koh Li Ping		Singapore (SIN); Lay Soo Chew; Patricia Kim
1991 Manila	Indonesia (INA)		Singapore (SIN); Loy Soo Han; Koh Li Ping
1993 Singapore	Indonesia (INA)		Singapore (SIN); Loy Soo Han; Koh Li Ping
1993 Singapore	Indonesia (INA)		Singapore (SIN); Sim Yong Wah; Tan Paey Fern
1995 Chiang Mai	Singapore (SIN)	Indonesia (INA)	Indonesia (INA)
1995 Chiang Mai	Singapore (SIN)	Indonesia (INA)	Singapore (SIN)
1997 Jakarta	Vietnam (VIE); Vu Manh Cuong; Ngo Thu Thuy	Singapore (SIN); Sen Yew Fai; Jing Junhong	Indonesia (INA); M Al Arkam; Fauziah Yulianti
1997 Jakarta	Vietnam (VIE); Vu Manh Cuong; Ngo Thu Thuy	Singapore (SIN); Sen Yew Fai; Jing Junhong	Indonesia (INA); Hadiyudo Prayitmo; Rossy Pratiwi Dipoyanti
1999 Bandar Seri Begawan	Singapore (SIN); Zhang Tai Yong; Jing Junhong	Indonesia (INA); Al. Arkam; Fauziah Yulianti	Singapore (SIN); Duan Yong Jun; Li Jiawei
1999 Bandar Seri Begawan	Singapore (SIN); Zhang Tai Yong; Jing Junhong	Indonesia (INA); Al. Arkam; Fauziah Yulianti	Thailand (THA); Phakpoom Sanguansin; Anisara Muangsuk
2001 Kuala Lumpur	Singapore (SIN); Zhang Tai Yong; Jing Junhong	Thailand (THA); Phakpoom Sanguansin; Nanthana Komwong	Singapore (SIN); Duan Yong Jun; Li Jiawei
2001 Kuala Lumpur	Singapore (SIN); Zhang Tai Yong; Jing Junhong	Thailand (THA); Phakpoom Sanguansin; Nanthana Komwong	Vietnam (VIE); Vu Manh Cuong; Ngo Thu Thuy
2003 Hanoi	Singapore (SIN); Cai Xiaoli; Li Jiawei	Singapore (SIN); Zhang Tai Yong; Jing Junhong	Thailand (THA); Phakpoom Sanguansin; Nanthana Komwong
2003 Hanoi	Singapore (SIN); Cai Xiaoli; Li Jiawei	Singapore (SIN); Zhang Tai Yong; Jing Junhong	Thailand (THA); Phuchong Sanguansin; Anisara Muangsuk
2005 Manila	Singapore (SIN); Yang Zi; Zhang Xueling	Singapore (SIN); Cai Xiaoli; Li Jiawei	Malaysia (MAS); Muhd Shakirin Ibrahim; Beh Lee Wei
2005 Manila	Singapore (SIN); Yang Zi; Zhang Xueling	Singapore (SIN); Cai Xiaoli; Li Jiawei	Thailand (THA); Chaisit Chaitat; Anisara Muangsuk
2007 Nakhon Ratchasima	Singapore (SIN); Yang Zi; Li Jiawei	Singapore (SIN); Gao Ning; Sun Beibei	Thailand (THA); Phakpoom Sanguansin; Nanthana Komwong
2007 Nakhon Ratchasima	Singapore (SIN); Yang Zi; Li Jiawei	Singapore (SIN); Gao Ning; Sun Beibei	Thailand (THA); Phuchong Sanguansin; Anisara Muangsuk
2009 Vientiane	Singapore (SIN); Yang Zi; Wang Yuegu	Singapore (SIN); Gao Ning; Feng Tianwei	Malaysia (MAS); Muhd Shakirin Ibrahim; Beh Lee Wei
2009 Vientiane	Singapore (SIN); Yang Zi; Wang Yuegu	Singapore (SIN); Gao Ning; Feng Tianwei	Thailand (THA); Phakpoom Sanguansin; Nanthana Komwong
2011 Palembang/Jakarta	Singapore (SIN); Yang Zi; Sun Beibei	Singapore (SIN); Gao Ning; Feng Tianwei	Thailand (THA); Chaisit Chaitat; Nanthana Komwong
2011 Palembang/Jakarta	Singapore (SIN); Yang Zi; Sun Beibei	Singapore (SIN); Gao Ning; Feng Tianwei	Vietnam (VIE); Đinh Quang Linh; Mai Hoàng Mỹ Trang
2013 Naypyidaw	Not held		
2015 Singapore	Singapore (SIN); Yang Zi; Yu Mengyu	Thailand (THA); Padasak Tanviriyavechakul; Suthasini Sawettabut	Singapore (SIN); Li Hu; Zhou Yihan
2015 Singapore	Singapore (SIN); Yang Zi; Yu Mengyu	Thailand (THA); Padasak Tanviriyavechakul; Suthasini Sawettabut	Vietnam (VIE); Đinh Quang Linh; Mai Hoàng Mỹ Trang
2017 Kuala Lumpur	Thailand (THA); Padasak Tanviriyavechakul; Suthasini Sawettabut	Singapore (SGP); Pang Xue Jie; Yu Mengyu	Singapore (SGP); Clarence Chew; Zhou Yihan
2017 Kuala Lumpur	Thailand (THA); Padasak Tanviriyavechakul; Suthasini Sawettabut	Singapore (SGP); Pang Xue Jie; Yu Mengyu	Vietnam (VIE); Đinh Quang Linh; Mai Hoàng Mỹ Trang
2019 Philippines	Not held		
2021 Hanoi	Singapore (SGP); Koen Pang Yew En; Wong Xin Ru	Singapore (SGP); Clarence Chew; Zeng Jian	Thailand (THA); Padasak Tanviriyavechakul; Suthasini Sawettabut
2021 Hanoi	Singapore (SGP); Koen Pang Yew En; Wong Xin Ru	Singapore (SGP); Clarence Chew; Zeng Jian	Thailand (THA); Phakpoom Sanguansin; Orawan Paranang
2023 Cambodia	Vietnam; Đinh Anh Hoàng; Trần Mai Ngọc	Singapore; Clarence Chew Zhe Yu; Zeng Jian	Thailand; Sarayut Tancharoen; Wanwisa Aueawiriyayothin
2023 Cambodia	Vietnam; Đinh Anh Hoàng; Trần Mai Ngọc	Singapore; Clarence Chew Zhe Yu; Zeng Jian	Thailand; Padasak Tanviriyavechakul; Tamolwan Khetkuan
2025 Thailand	Singapore; Koen Pang; Zeng Jian	Malaysia; Javen Choong; Karen Lyne Dick	Malaysia; Wong Qi Shen; Tee Ai Xin
2025 Thailand	Singapore; Koen Pang; Zeng Jian	Malaysia; Javen Choong; Karen Lyne Dick	Thailand; Nawin Nekamporn; Jinnipa Sawettabut

== See also ==
- Table tennis at the Asian Games
- List of Asian Games medalists in table tennis
