= Table tennis at the 1987 SEA Games =

- Venue: Senen Youth Centre
- Dates: 10-16 September 1987

The Table Tennis at the 1987 SEA Games was held between 10 September to 16 September at Senen Youth Centre.

== Medal summary ==
Event	Gold	Silver	Bronze
Men Singles	(Indonesia) Haryono Wong	(Thailand) Chartchai Teekavirakit	(Malaysia) Lim Chon Leong (Indonesia) Sinyo Supit
Men's Doubles	Indonesia (INA); Tonny Maringgi; Sinyo Supit	Thailand (THA); Manop Kantawang; Chartchai Teekavirakit	Thailand (THA); Kriengkraipetch Panumas; Poonsak AA Indonesia (INA); Haryono Wong Tye; Fabian Fadli
Men's team	Indonesia (INA); Tonny Maringgi; Sinyo Supit; Haryono Wong	Thailand (THA); Chartchai Teekavirakit; Kriengkraipetch Panumas; Manop Kantawang	Malaysia (MAS); Lim Chon Leong; Peong Tah Seng; Tay Kee Singapore (SIN); Loy Soo Chew; Goh Yong Koon
Women Singles	(Indonesia) Rossy Pratiwi Dipoyanti	(Singapore) Patricia Kim	(Thailand) Chanida Khendoknoi (Thailand) Suwaporn Prapkutikul
Women's Doubles	Malaysia (MAS); Lau Wai Cheng; Leong Mee Wan	Indonesia (INA); Rossy Pratiwi Dipoyanti; Lydia Waluyan	Thailand (THA); Chanida Khendoknoi; Suwaporn Prapkutikul Indonesia (INA); Evi Sumendap; Mulatsih
Women's team	Singapore (SIN); Patricia Kim; Koh Li Ping; Tan Ah Tee	Indonesia (INA); Mulatsih; Rossy Pratiwi Dipoyanti; Lidya Wayulan	Malaysia (MAS); Leong Mee Wan; Lau Wai Cheng; Tan Ah Tee Thailand (THA); Chanida Khendoknoi; Suwaporn Prapkutikul

== Medal table ==
Rank	Nation	Gold	Silver	Bronze	Total
1	Indonesia (INA)	4	2	3	9
2	Singapore (SIN)	1	1	1	3
3	Malaysia (MAS)	1	0	3	4
4	Thailand (THA)	0	3	5	8
Totals (4 entries)		6	6	12	24
