= Table tennis at the 1997 SEA Games =

- Venue: Pertamina Sports Hall
- Location: Simpruk, Jakarta, Indonesia
- Dates: 12–18 October 1997
- Competitors: 69 from 8 nations

Table tennis at the 1997 SEA Games is being held in the Pertamina Sports Hall, in Simpruk, Jakarta, Indonesia from 12 to 18 October 1997.

== Participating nations ==
A total of 69 athletes from eight nations are competing in table tennis at the 1997 Southeast Asian Games:

- Cambodia (6)
- Indonesia (10)
- Malaysia (9)
- Myanmar (6)
- Philippines (10)
- Singapore (8)
- Thailand (10)
- Vietnam (10)

== Medalists ==
Event	Gold	Silver	Bronze
Men's singles	Indonesia; Muhammad Al Arkam	Indonesia; Hadiyudo Prayitno	Thailand; Chaisit Chaitat
Men's singles	Indonesia; Muhammad Al Arkam	Indonesia; Hadiyudo Prayitno	Vietnam; Vu Manh Cuong
Women's singles	Singapore; Jing Junhong	Indonesia; Rossy Pratiwi Dipoyanti	Vietnam; Thy Nguyen Mai
Women's singles	Singapore; Jing Junhong	Indonesia; Rossy Pratiwi Dipoyanti	Singapore; Tan Paey Fern
Men's doubles	Indonesia; Deddy Da Costa; Muhammad Al Arkam	Singapore; Sen Yew Fai; Koh Chin Guan	Indonesia; Hadiyudo Prayitmo; Ismu Harinto
Men's doubles	Indonesia; Deddy Da Costa; Muhammad Al Arkam	Singapore; Sen Yew Fai; Koh Chin Guan	Malaysia; Eng Tian Syah; Yong Hong Cheh
Women's doubles	Indonesia; Putri Septi Naulina Hasibuan; Fauziah Yulianti	Indonesia; Rossy Pratiwi Dipoyanti; Mulatsih	Singapore; Jing Junhong; Tan Paey Fern
Women's doubles	Indonesia; Putri Septi Naulina Hasibuan; Fauziah Yulianti	Indonesia; Rossy Pratiwi Dipoyanti; Mulatsih	Vietnam; Tran Le Phuong Linh; Ngo Thu Thuy
Mixed doubles	Vietnam; Vu Manh Cuong; Ngo Thu Thuy	Singapore; Sen Yew Fai; Jing Junhong	Indonesia; Muhammad Al Arkam; Fauziah Yulianti
Mixed doubles	Vietnam; Vu Manh Cuong; Ngo Thu Thuy	Singapore; Sen Yew Fai; Jing Junhong	Indonesia; Hadiyudo Prayitmo; Rossy Pratiwi Dipoyanti
Men's team	Indonesia; Muhammad Al Arkam; Deddy Da Costa; Ismu Harinto; Hadiyudo Prayitmo; Mohammad Zainuddin	Vietnam; Đoàn Kiến Quốc; Doan Trong Nghia; Le Huy; Pham Quoc Long; Vu Manh Cuong	Malaysia; Chan Koon Wah; Choo Sim Guan; Eng Tian Syh; Ng Shui Leong; Yong Hong Cheh
Men's team	Indonesia; Muhammad Al Arkam; Deddy Da Costa; Ismu Harinto; Hadiyudo Prayitmo; Mohammad Zainuddin	Vietnam; Đoàn Kiến Quốc; Doan Trong Nghia; Le Huy; Pham Quoc Long; Vu Manh Cuong	Thailand; Sanan Ariyachotima; Chaisit Chaitat; Kobakij Chamnapaisan; Virotin Chanpaka; Nattapong Suntonthiti
Women's team	Indonesia; Rossy Pratiwi Dipoyanti; Putri Septi Naulina Hasibuan; Mulatsih; Nani Sugiani; Fauziah Yulianti	Vietnam; Huynh Trung, Hieu; Ngo Thu Thuy; Nguyen Mai Thy; Tran Le My Linh; Tran Le Phuong Linh	Singapore; Jing Junhong; Koh Li Ping; Lau Yu Han; Tan Paey Fern
Women's team	Indonesia; Rossy Pratiwi Dipoyanti; Putri Septi Naulina Hasibuan; Mulatsih; Nani Sugiani; Fauziah Yulianti	Vietnam; Huynh Trung, Hieu; Ngo Thu Thuy; Nguyen Mai Thy; Tran Le My Linh; Tran Le Phuong Linh	Thailand; Pornsri Ariyachotima; Nanthana Komwong; Anisara Muangsuk; Suttilux Rattanaprayoon; Tidaporn Vongboon

== Medal table ==
* Host nation (Indonesia)

Rank	Nation	Gold	Silver	Bronze	Total
1	Indonesia (INA)*	5	3	3	11
2	Singapore (SIN)	1	2	3	6
2	Vietnam (VIE)	1	2	3	6
4	Thailand (THA)	0	0	3	3
5	Malaysia (MAS)	0	0	2	2
Totals (5 entries)		7	7	14	28
