= Table tennis at the 1995 SEA Games =

- Venue: Gymnasium 2, Chiang Mai University
- Location: Chiang Mai, Thailand
- Dates: 10–15 December 1995
- Competitors: 69 from 8 nations

Table tennis at the 1995 SEA Games is being held in the Gymnasium 2, Chiang Mai University in Chiang Mai, Thailand from 10 to 15 December 1995.

== Medalists ==
| Event | Gold | Silver | Bronze |
|---|---|---|---|
| Men's singles | Vietnam; Vũ Mạnh Cường | Indonesia | Indonesia |
| Men's singles | Vietnam; Vũ Mạnh Cường | Indonesia | Thailand |
| Women's singles | Singapore; Jing Junhong | Indonesia; Rossy Pratiwi Dipoyanti | Thailand |
| Women's singles | Singapore; Jing Junhong | Indonesia; Rossy Pratiwi Dipoyanti | Vietnam |
| Men's doubles | Indonesia | Indonesia | Malaysia; Eng Tian Syh; Lim Chin Leong |
| Men's doubles | Indonesia | Indonesia | Thailand |
| Women's doubles | Indonesia; Rossy Pratiwi Dipoyanti; Mulatsih | Singapore; Jing Junhong; Tan Paey Fern | Malaysia; Phua Bee Sim; Chong Choi Thing |
| Women's doubles | Indonesia; Rossy Pratiwi Dipoyanti; Mulatsih | Singapore; Jing Junhong; Tan Paey Fern | Thailand |
| Mixed doubles | Singapore; Sen Yew Fai; Jing Junhong | Indonesia; Anton Suseno; Mulatsih | Indonesia; Rossy Pratiwi Dipoyanti |
| Mixed doubles | Singapore; Sen Yew Fai; Jing Junhong | Indonesia; Anton Suseno; Mulatsih | Singapore; Sim Yong Wah; Tan Paey Fern |
| Men's team | Indonesia | Vietnam | Malaysia; Andy Ng Shiu Leong; Eng Tian Syh; Lim Chin Leong; Yong Hong Cheh; H'ng Kim Shan |
| Men's team | Indonesia | Vietnam | Thailand |
| Women's team | Indonesia; Rossy Pratiwi Dipoyanti | Thailand | Singapore |
| Women's team | Indonesia; Rossy Pratiwi Dipoyanti | Thailand | Vietnam |

== Medal table ==
* Host nation (Thailand)

| Rank | Nation | Gold | Silver | Bronze | Total |
|---|---|---|---|---|---|
| 1 | Indonesia (INA) | 4 | 4 | 2 | 10 |
| 2 | Singapore (SIN) | 2 | 1 | 2 | 5 |
| 3 | Vietnam (VIE) | 1 | 1 | 2 | 4 |
| 4 | Thailand (THA)* | 0 | 1 | 5 | 6 |
| 5 | Malaysia (MAS) | 0 | 0 | 3 | 3 |
| Totals (5 entries) | | 7 | 7 | 14 | 28 |
