= Table tennis at the 1999 SEA Games =

- Venue: Menglait Sports Hall
- Location: Bandar Seri Begawan, Brunei
- Dates: 8–15 August 1999
- Competitors: 80 from 9 nations

Table tennis at the 1999 SEA Games is being held in the Menglait Sports Hall, in Bandar Seri Begawan, Brunei from 8 to 15 August 1999.

== Participating nations ==
A total of 80 athletes from nine nations are competing in table tennis at the 1999 Southeast Asian Games:

- Brunei (10)
- Cambodia (8)
- Indonesia (10)
- Malaysia (10)
- Myanmar (4)
- Philippines (10)
- Singapore (10)
- Thailand (10)
- Vietnam (8)

== Medalists ==
Event	Gold	Silver	Bronze
Men's singles	Singapore; Duan Yong Jun	Indonesia; Anton Suseno	Philippines; Richard Gonzales
Men's singles	Singapore; Duan Yong Jun	Indonesia; Anton Suseno	Singapore; Zhang Tai Yong
Women's singles	Singapore; Li Jiawei	Thailand; Nanthana Komwong	Singapore; Jing Junhong
Women's singles	Singapore; Li Jiawei	Thailand; Nanthana Komwong	Thailand; Anisara Muangsuk
Men's doubles	Indonesia; Anton Suseno; Hadi J.	Singapore; Duan Yong Jun; Zhang Tai Yong	Vietnam; Đoàn Kiến Quốc; Le Huy
Men's doubles	Indonesia; Anton Suseno; Hadi J.	Singapore; Duan Yong Jun; Zhang Tai Yong	Vietnam; Vu Manh Cuong; Bui Xuan Ha
Women's doubles	Singapore; Li Jiawei; Jing Junhong	Indonesia; Fauziah Yulianti; Putri Septi Naulina Hasibuan	Indonesia; Christine Ferliana Santoso; Rossy Pratiwi Dipoyanti
Women's doubles	Singapore; Li Jiawei; Jing Junhong	Indonesia; Fauziah Yulianti; Putri Septi Naulina Hasibuan	Thailand; Nanthana Komwong; Anisara Muangsuk
Mixed doubles	Singapore; Zhang Tai Yong; Jing Junhong	Indonesia; Muhammad Al Arkam; Fauziah Yulianti	Singapore; Duan Yong Jun; Li Jiawei
Mixed doubles	Singapore; Zhang Tai Yong; Jing Junhong	Indonesia; Muhammad Al Arkam; Fauziah Yulianti	Thailand; Sanguansin Phakpoom; Anisara Muangsuk
Men's team	Singapore; Sen Yew Fai; Duan Yong Jun; Cai Xiao Li; Koh Chin Guan; Zhang Tai Yong	Vietnam; Đoàn Kiến Quốc; Vu Manh Cuong; Le Huy	Indonesia; Anton Suseno; Muhammad Al Arkam; Ersan Sutanto; Deddy Da Costa; Hadiyudo Prayitno
Men's team	Singapore; Sen Yew Fai; Duan Yong Jun; Cai Xiao Li; Koh Chin Guan; Zhang Tai Yong	Vietnam; Đoàn Kiến Quốc; Vu Manh Cuong; Le Huy	Malaysia; Eng Tian Syh; Chan Koon Wah; Choo Sim Guan; Ng Shui Leong
Women's team	Singapore; Li Jiawei; Tan Paey Fern; Lee Su Hui; Jing Junhong	Thailand; Anisara Muangsuk; Nanthana Komwong; Tidaporn Vongboon; Pornsri Ariyachotima; Suttilux Rattanaprayoon	Indonesia; Ceria Nilasari Jusma; Christine Ferliana Santoso; Rossy Pratiwi Dipoyanti; Fauziah Yulianti; Putri Septi Naulina Hasibuan
Women's team	Singapore; Li Jiawei; Tan Paey Fern; Lee Su Hui; Jing Junhong	Thailand; Anisara Muangsuk; Nanthana Komwong; Tidaporn Vongboon; Pornsri Ariyachotima; Suttilux Rattanaprayoon	Vietnam; Ngo Thu Thuy; Nguyen Ngoc Uyen; Nguyen Mai Thy; Tran Le Phuong Linh

== Medal table ==
* Host nation (Brunei)

Rank	Nation	Gold	Silver	Bronze	Total
1	Singapore (SIN)	6	1	3	10
2	Indonesia (INA)	1	3	3	7
3	Thailand (THA)	0	2	3	5
4	Vietnam (VIE)	0	1	3	4
5	Malaysia (MAS)	0	0	1	1
5	Philippines (PHI)	0	0	1	1
Totals (6 entries)		7	7	14	28
