= Table tennis at the 1983 SEA Games =

Table Tennis at the 1983 SEA Games

The Table Tennis at the 1983 SEA Games was held between 30 May to 5 June at HDB Club, Toa Payoh.

== Medal summary ==
Event	Gold	Silver	Bronze
Men Singles	(Indonesia) Sinyo Supit	(Indonesia) Faisal Rachman	(Malaysia) Peong Tah Seng (Thailand) Chartchai Teekavirakit
Men's Doubles	Indonesia (INA); Sugiharto Sutedja; Sinyo Supit	Indonesia (INA); Faisal Rachman; Haryono Wong	Singapore (SIN); Yueng Hin Choong; Ang Wah Heng Singapore (SIN); Lee Yew Chye; Png Kim Siang
Women Singles	(Thailand) Loysawai Patcharin	(Indonesia) Diana Wuisan	(Singapore) Leow Hock Moi (Thailand) Ladda Kumuthpongpanich
Women's Doubles	Indonesia (INA); Diana Wuisan; Carla Tejasukmana	Thailand (THA); Ladda Kumuthpongpanich; Loysawai Patcharin	Singapore (SIN); Leow Hock Moi; Patricia Kim Malaysia (MAS); Leong Mee Wan; Lok Wai Har
Mix Doubles	Indonesia (INA); Haryono Wong; Lilik Winarni	Indonesia (INA); Faisal Rachman; Carla Tejasukmana	Malaysia (MAS); Peong Tah Seng; Leong Mee Wan Thailand (THA); Manop Kantawang; Loysawai Patcharin
Men's team	Indonesia (INA); Sugiharto Sutedja; Sinyo Supit; Faisal Rachman	Malaysia (MAS); Lee Kin Kee; Kok Chong Fatt	Thailand (THA); Manop Kantawang; Chartchai Teekavirakit; Chayanond Wuwanich
Women's team	Indonesia (INA); Diana Wuisan; Lilik Winarni; Carla Tejakusuma	Thailand (THA); Loysawai Patcharin; Ladda Kumuthpongpanich; Supawadel Pilsuwan	Singapore (SIN); Leow Hock Moi; Patricia Kim; Tan Ah Tee

== Medal table ==
Rank	Nation	Gold	Silver	Bronze	Total
1	Indonesia (INA)	6	4	0	10
2	Thailand (THA)	1	2	4	7
3	Malaysia (MAS)	0	1	3	4
4	Singapore (SIN)	0	0	5	5
Totals (4 entries)		7	7	12	26
