= Malaysia at the 1981 SEA Games =

Malaysia at the 1981 Southeast Asian Games
- IOC code: MAS
- NOC: Olympic Council of Malaysia
- Website: www.olympic.org.my (in English)

in Manila
- Competitors: 243 in 19 sports
- Medals Ranked 4th: Gold 16 Silver 27 Bronze 31 Total 74

Southeast Asian Games appearances (overview)
- 1959; 1961; 1965; 1967; 1969; 1971; 1973; 1975; 1977; 1979; 1981; 1983; 1985; 1987; 1989; 1991; 1993; 1995; 1997; 1999; 2001; 2003; 2005; 2007; 2009; 2011; 2013; 2015; 2017; 2019; 2021; 2023; 2025; 2027; 2029

Malaysia competed in the 1981 Southeast Asian Games held in Manila, Philippines from 6 to 15 December 1981.

== Medal summary ==
=== Medals by sport ===
Sport	Gold	Silver	Bronze	Total	Rank
Athletics	11	0	0	11	
Badminton	0	2	4	6	2
Basketball	1	1	0	2	1
Football	0	1	0	1	2
Table tennis	0	1	0	1	2
Volleyball	0	1	0	1	2
Total	16	27	31	74	4

=== Medallists ===
Medal	Name	Sport	Event
Gold	Hoo Yoon Wah	Athletics	Men's high jump
Gold	Ballang Lasung	Athletics	Men's javelin throw
Gold	Hanapiah Nasir	Athletics	Men's decathlon
Gold	Vellasamy Subramaniam	Athletics	Men's 10,000 metres track walk
Gold	Vellasamy Subramaniam	Athletics	Men's 20 kilometres road walk
Gold	Mumtaz Jaafar	Athletics	Women's 100 metres
Gold	Vengadasalam Angamah	Athletics	Women's 800 metres
Gold	Zaiton Othman	Athletics	Women's heptathlon
Gold	Paramasivam Sakthirani	Athletics	Women's 10,000 metres track walk
Gold	Mumtaz Begum Jaafar; V. Angamah; Zaiton Othman; Saik Oik Cum	Athletics	Women's 4 × 100 metres relay
Gold	Mumtaz Begum Jaafar; V. Angamah; Zaiton Othman; Saik Oik Cum	Athletics	Women's 4 × 400 metres relay
Gold	Malaysia national basketball team	Basketball	Women's tournament
Silver	Malaysia national basketball team	Basketball	Men's tournament
Silver	Jalani Sidek; Razif Sidek	Badminton	Men's doubles
Silver	Malaysia national badminton team	Badminton	Men's team
Silver	Malaysia national football team: R. Arumugam; Zainal Abidin Hassan; K. Gunasakarn; Subramaniam Pushpanathan; G. Torayraju; Jamal Abd. Nasir Ismael; Muhidin Hussin; Ibrahim Haji Din; Mokhtar Dahari; Wong Hung Nung; Rosli Hussein; Mohd. Yassin Mohd. Noor; Abdul Muin Abdul Rahim; Sujeindran M. Suppiah; Alis Syed Mohamad; Mohd. Kholid Hj. Mohd. Ali	Football	Men's tournament
Silver	Malaysia national volleyball team	Volleyball	Men's tournament
Bronze	Misbun Sidek	Badminton	Men's singles
Bronze	Katherine Teh	Badminton	Women's singles
Bronze	Razif Sidek; Leong Chai Lean	Badminton	Mixed singles
Bronze	Malaysia national badminton team	Badminton	Women's team
Bronze	Goh Shwu Fang	Table tennis	Women's singles

== Football ==
=== Men's tournament ===
Group A

Team	Pld	W	D	L	GF	GA	GD	Pts
Malaysia	2	1	1	0	3	2	+1	3
Thailand	2	0	2	0	5	5	0	2
Burma	2	0	1	1	3	4	−1	1

6 December 1981

Malaysia	1 – 0	Burma

8 December 1981

Malaysia	2 – 2	Thailand
Jamal Nasir 24'; S. Suvindran 33'		Piyapong Pue-on 50'; Vorawan Chitavanich 73'

Semifinal

13 December 1981

Malaysia	1 – 1	Singapore
Abdul Muin 85'		Au Yeong Pak Kuan 23' (pen.)
Penalties
R. Arumugam (penalty missed); Mokhtar Dahari (penalty scored); G. Torairaju (penalty scored); Wong Hung Num (penalty scored); Zainal Abidin Hassan (penalty scored); S. Sijeindran (penalty scored)	5 – 4	(penalty scored) David Lee; (penalty scored) Hashim Hoshni; (penalty scored) Au Yeong Pak Kuan; (penalty scored) T. Pathmanathan; (penalty missed) Salim Moin; (penalty missed) Fandi Ahmad

Gold medal match

15 December 1981

Thailand	2 – 1	Malaysia
Madard Tongtaum 8'; Piyapong Pue-on 41'		Abdul Muin 86'

Rizal Memorial Stadium
