= Malaysia at the 1983 SEA Games =

Malaysia at the 1983 Southeast Asian Games
- IOC code: MAS
- NOC: Olympic Council of Malaysia
- Website: www.olympic.org.my (in English)

in Singapore
- Competitors: 282 in 19 sports
- Medals Ranked 6th: Gold 16 Silver 25 Bronze 40 Total 81

Southeast Asian Games appearances (overview)
- 1959; 1961; 1965; 1967; 1969; 1971; 1973; 1975; 1977; 1979; 1981; 1983; 1985; 1987; 1989; 1991; 1993; 1995; 1997; 1999; 2001; 2003; 2005; 2007; 2009; 2011; 2013; 2015; 2017; 2019; 2021; 2023; 2025; 2027; 2029

Malaysia competed in the 1983 Southeast Asian Games held in Singapore from 28 May to 6 June 1983.

== Medal summary ==
=== Medals by sport ===
Sport	Gold	Silver	Bronze	Total	Rank
Archery	0	0	1	1	5
Athletics	7	0	0	7	
Badminton	0	0	5	5	4
Basketball	1	1	0	2	1
Football	0	0	1	1	3
Table tennis	0	0	1	1	4
Volleyball	0	0	1	1	4
Total	16	25	40	81	6

=== Medallists ===
Medal	Name	Sport	Event
Gold	Batumalai Rajakumar	Athletics	Men's 800 metres
Gold	Batumalai Rajakumar	Athletics	Men's 1500 metres
Gold	Ramjit Nairulal	Athletics	Men's high jump
Gold	Ballang Lasung	Athletics	Men's javelin throw
Gold	Hanapiah Nasir	Athletics	Men's decathlon
Gold	Norsham Yoon	Athletics	Women's javelin throw
Gold	Zaiton Othman	Athletics	Women's heptathlon
Gold	Malaysia national basketball team	Basketball	Women's tournament
Silver	Malaysia national basketball team	Basketball	Men's tournament
Bronze		Archery	Men's team recurve
Bronze	Ong Beng Teong; Soh Goon Chup	Badminton	Men's doubles
Bronze	Katherine Teh; Juliet Poon	Badminton	Women's doubles
Bronze	Razif Sidek; Leong Chai Lean	Badminton	Mixed doubles
Bronze	Malaysia national badminton team	Badminton	Men's team
Bronze	Malaysia national badminton team	Badminton	Women's team
Bronze	Malaysia national football team: Abdul Rashid Hasan; Wong Hong Nung; Santokh Singh; Serbegeth Singh; Lim Teong Kim; G. Torayraju; Ahmad Yusof; Mohd. Khalid Hj. Mohd. Ali; Chen Wooi Haw; Zainal Abidin Hassan; A. Rukkumaran; R. Arumugam; B. Sathianathan Nair; Hasanuddin Hassan; Md. Noor Haji Yaacob; Ahmad Sabri Ismail	Football	Men's tournament
Bronze	Peong Tah Seng	Table tennis	Men's singles
Bronze	Malaysia national volleyball team	Volleyball	Women's team

== Football ==
=== Men's tournament ===
Group A

Team	Pld	W	D	L	GF	GA	GD	Pts
Singapore	2	2	0	0	7	1	+6	4
Malaysia	2	0	1	1	1	2	−1	1
Philippines	2	0	1	1	0	5	−5	1

28 May 1983

Singapore	2 – 1	Malaysia
Fandi Ahmad 7'; V. Sundramoorthy 47'		Chen Wooi Haw 20'

National Stadium, Singapore

30 May 1983

Philippines	0 – 0	Malaysia

National Stadium, Singapore

Semifinal

4 June 1983

Thailand	1 – 1	Malaysia
Chalor Hongkajohn 68'		Santokh Singh 26'
Penalties
Piyapong Pue-on (penalty scored); Chalor Hongkajohn (penalty scored); Chalermwoot Sa-Ngapol (penalty scored)	3 – 0	(penalty missed) Santokh Singh; (penalty missed) Zainal Abidin Hassan; (penalty missed) Wong Hung Nung

National Stadium, Singapore

Bronze medal match

5 June 1983

Malaysia	5 – 0	Brunei
Zainal Abidin Hassan 42'; Japari Samat 78' (og.); Santokh Singh 85'; A. Rukumaran 89'

National Stadium, Singapore
