= Table tennis at the 1981 SEA Games =

Table Tennis at the 1981 SEA Games
- Venue: Pasay Sports Complex
- Location: Pasay, Philippines
- Dates: 7–11 December

The Table Tennis at the 1981 SEA Games was held between 07 December to 11 December at Pasay Sports Complex, Pasay, Philippines.

== Medal summary ==
Event	Gold	Silver	Bronze
Men Singles	(Indonesia) Gunawan Sutedja	(Indonesia) Faisal Rachman	(Thailand) Chaisak Sitichartpongsuk (Thailand) Chayanand Wuwanich
Men's Doubles	Indonesia (INA); Tonny Maringgi; Sinyo Supit	Indonesia (INA); Faisal Rachman; Haryono Wong	Thailand (THA); Chayanand Wuwanich; Atichartpongsuk Thailand (THA); Kangthanwan; Riewruengsuk
Men's team	Indonesia (INA); Faisal Rachman; Gunawan Sutedja; Haryono Wong	Thailand (THA); K. Chaisak; K. Mowap; W. Chayamond	Malaysia (MAS); Lee Kim Kee; Tan Biah Sian; Tay Kee
Women Singles	(Indonesia) Diana Wuisan	(Indonesia) Carla Tedjasukmana	(Malaysia) Goh Shwu Fang (Thailand) Patcharin Loysawai
Women's Doubles	Thailand (THA); Patcharin Loysawai; Ladda Kumuthpongpanich	Indonesia (INA); Diana Wuisan; Carla Tedjasukmana	Indonesia (INA); Lilik Winarni; Dewi Malaysia (MAS); Goh Shwu Fang; Yip Pau Chang
Women's team	Thailand (THA); Ladda Kumuchpongpanich; Patcharin Loysawai	Indonesia (INA); Diana Wuisan; Carla Tedjasukmana; Lilik Winarni	Singapore (SIN); Goh Chong Mei; Lim Gek Hua; Kim Mein Wong
Mix Doubles	Indonesia (INA); Gunawan Sutedja; Diana Wuisan	Indonesia (INA); Haryono Wong; Lilik Winarni	Malaysia (MAS); Peong Tah Seng; Goh Shwu Fang Thailand (THA); Chayanand Wuwanich; Patcharin Loysawai

== Medal table ==
Rank	Nation	Gold	Silver	Bronze	Total
1	Indonesia (INA)	5	6	1	12
2	Thailand (THA)	2	1	6	9
3	Malaysia (MAS)	0	0	4	4
4	Singapore (SIN)	0	0	1	1
Totals (4 entries)		7	7	12	26
