= List of flag bearers for Indonesia at the Olympics =

Indonesia at the Olympics
- IOC code: INA
- NOC: Indonesian Olympic Committee
- Website: www.nocindonesia.org (in Indonesian)
- Medals: Gold 10 Silver 14 Bronze 16 Total 40

Summer appearances
- 1952; 1956; 1960; 1964; 1968; 1972; 1976; 1980; 1984; 1988; 1992; 1996; 2000; 2004; 2008; 2012; 2016; 2020; 2024

This is a list of flag bearers who have represented Indonesia at the Olympics.

Flag bearers carry the national flag of their country at the opening ceremony of the Olympic Games.

#	Event year	Season	Flag bearer	Sport
1	1952	Summer	Habib Suharko	Swimming
2	1972	Summer	Wiem Gommies	Boxing
3	1976	Summer	Syamsul Anwar Harahap	Boxing
4	1984	Summer	Lukman Niode	Swimming
5	1988	Summer	Tonny Maringgi	Table tennis
6	1992	Summer	Christian Hadinata (Note: He was the first Indonesian coach which became the flagbearer.)	Coach
7	1996	Summer	Hendrik Simangunsong	Boxing
8	2000	Summer	Rexy Mainaky	Badminton
9	2004	Summer	Christian Hadinata (Note: Krisna Bayu was originally the flag bearer, however the role was later done by Christian Hadinata because Bayu was suffering from flu at the eve of opening ceremony.)	Coach
10	2008	Summer	Oka Sulaksana	Sailing
11	2012	Summer	I Gede Siman Sudartawa	Swimming
12	2016	Summer	Maria Natalia Londa	Athletics
13	2020	Summer	Rio Waida (Note: Originally, surfer Rio Waida and weightlifter Nurul Akmal were named as co-flagbearers for the parade of nations during the opening ceremony. In fact, Rio eventually became the sole flagbearer.)	Surfing
14	2024	Summer	Maryam March Maharani	Judo

== See also ==
- Indonesia at the Olympics
