= Tonny Maringgi =

Indonesian table tennis player (1959–2019)

Personal information
- Nationality: Indonesian
- Born: 10 June 1959 Kendari, Indonesia
- Died: 15 September 2019 (aged 60) Jakarta, Indonesia

Sport
- Sport: Table tennis
Medal record
Men's table tennis
Representing Indonesia
SEA Games
Gold medal – first place	1987 Jakarta	Men's doubles
Gold medal – first place	1987 Jakarta	Men's team

Tonny Zwingly Maringgi (10 June 1959 – 15 September 2019) was an Indonesian table tennis player. He competed in the men's singles event at the 1988 Summer Olympics.

Olympic Games
Preceded by Lukman Niode	Flagbearer for Indonesia; 1998 Seoul	Succeeded by Christian Hadinata
