= Malaysia at the 1997 SEA Games =

Malaysia at the 1997 Southeast Asian Games
- IOC code: MAS
- NOC: Olympic Council of Malaysia
- Website: www.olympic.org.my (in English)

in Jakarta
- Competitors: 548 in 34 sports
- Medals Ranked 3rd: Gold 55 Silver 68 Bronze 75 Total 198

Southeast Asian Games appearances (overview)
- 1959; 1961; 1965; 1967; 1969; 1971; 1973; 1975; 1977; 1979; 1981; 1983; 1985; 1987; 1989; 1991; 1993; 1995; 1997; 1999; 2001; 2003; 2005; 2007; 2009; 2011; 2013; 2015; 2017; 2019; 2021; 2023; 2025; 2027; 2029

Malaysia competed in the 1997 Southeast Asian Games held in Jakarta, Indonesia from 11 to 19 December 1997.

== Medal summary ==
=== Medals by sport ===
Sport	Gold	Silver	Bronze	Total	Rank
Athletics	16	1	0	17	
Badminton	0	2	2	4	2
Basketball	1	1	0	2	1
Gymnastics	5	5	5	15	
Karate	2	9	7	18	
Squash	4	0	0	4	1
Table tennis	0	0	2	2	5
Total	55	68	75	198	3

=== Medallists ===
Medal	Name	Sport	Event
Gold	Romzi Bakar	Athletics	Men's 400 metres
Gold	Ramadoss Nandakumar	Athletics	Men's 800 metres
Gold	Arumugam Munusamy	Athletics	Men's 1500 metres
Gold	Munusamy Ramachandran	Athletics	Men's 5000 metres
Gold	Munusamy Ramachandran	Athletics	Men's 10,000 metres
Gold	Nur Herman Majid	Athletics	Men's 110 metres hurdles
Gold	Loo Kum Zee	Athletics	Men's high jump
Gold	Mohamed Zaki Sadri	Athletics	Men's long jump
Gold	Mohamed Zaki Sadri	Athletics	Men's triple jump
Gold	Harbans Narinder Singh	Athletics	Men's 20 kilometres road walk
Gold	Naravanan Govindasamy	Athletics	Men's 50 kilometres road walk
Gold	D.Nadarajan; Yazid Parlan; Romzi Bakar; S. Vasu	Athletics	Men's 4 × 400 metres relay
Gold	Shanti Govindasamy	Athletics	Women's 100 metres
Gold	Shanti Govindasamy	Athletics	Women's 200 metres
Gold	Manimagalay Nadarajah	Athletics	Women's 400 metres
Gold	Anastasia Karen Silvaraj	Athletics	Women's 10,000 metres track walk
Gold	Malaysia national basketball team	Basketball	Women's tournament
Gold	Sazali Samad	Bodybuilding	Men's bantamweight (65 kg)
Gold		Squash	Men's singles
Gold		Squash	Women's singles
Gold		Squash	Men's team
Gold		Squash	Women's team
Gold	Radhakrishnan Rangasamy Rasu	Taekwondo	Men's below (65kg)
Silver		Athletics	Women's 4 × 400 metres relay
Silver	Ong Ewe Hock	Badminton	Men's singles
Silver	Malaysia national badminton team: Chew Choon Eng; Jason Wong; Lee Chee Leong; Ong Ewe Hock; Rosman Razak; Tan Kim Her; Yong Hock Kin	Badminton	Men's team
Silver	Malaysia national basketball team	Basketball	Men's tournament
Bronze	Chew Choon Eng; Ang Li Peng	Badminton	Mixed doubles
Bronze	Malaysia national badminton team: Ang Li Peng; Chong Nga Fan; Ishwari Boopathy; Lee Yin Yin; Norhasikin Amin; Woon Sze Mei	Badminton	Women's team
Bronze	Eng Tian Syah; Yong Hong Cheh	Table tennis	Men's doubles
Bronze	Chan Koon Wah; Choo Sim Guan; Eng Tian Syh; Ng Shui Leong; Yong Hong Cheh	Table tennis	Men's team

== Football ==
=== Men's tournament ===
Group A

Team	Pld	W	D	L	GF	GA	GD	Pts
Indonesia	4	3	1	0	13	4	+9	10
Vietnam	4	2	1	1	7	4	+3	7
Laos	4	2	0	2	8	8	0	6
Malaysia	4	2	0	2	5	5	0	6
Philippines	4	0	0	4	1	13	−12	0

5 October 1997

Vietnam	0 – 1	Malaysia
		Azmi Mohammed

Senayan Stadium, Jakarta

7 October 1997

Malaysia	4 – 0	Philippines
Rizal Sukiman; Azmi Mohammed; Azman Adnan; Zami Mohd Noor

Senayan Stadium, Jakarta

9 October 1997

Indonesia	4 – 0	Malaysia
Fachry Husaini; Widodo C Putro; Kurniawan Dwi Yulianto

Senayan Stadium, Jakarta

14 October 1997

Laos	1 – 0	Malaysia
Keolakhone Channiphone

Senayan Stadium, Jakarta

=== Women's tournament ===
Group B

Team	Pld	W	D	L	GF	GA	GD	Pts
Myanmar	2	1	1	0	2	1	+1	4
Indonesia	2	0	2	0	2	2	0	2
Malaysia	2	0	1	1	1	2	−1	1

Myanmar	1 – 0	Malaysia

Indonesia	1 – 1	Malaysia
