= Table tennis at the 2023 SEA Games =

- Venue: Morodok Techo Table Tennis Hall
- Location: Phnom Penh, Cambodia
- Dates: 9–16 May 2023

Table tennis competitions at the 2023 SEA Games took place at Morodok Techo Table Tennis Hall, Phnom Penh, Cambodia from 9 to 16 May 2023. It served as a qualifier for the 2022 Hangzhou Asian Games.

== Medal table ==
* Host nation (Cambodia)

Rank	Nation	Gold	Silver	Bronze	Total
1	Singapore	4	2	3	9
2	Thailand	2	1	4	7
3	Vietnam	1	1	4	6
4	Malaysia	0	3	2	5
5	Philippines	0	0	1	1
Totals (5 entries)		7	7	14	28

== Medalists ==
Event	Gold	Silver	Bronze
Men's singles	Izaac Quek; Singapore	Nguyễn Anh Tú; Vietnam	Leong Chee Feng; Malaysia
Men's singles	Izaac Quek; Singapore	Nguyễn Anh Tú; Vietnam	Nguyễn Đức Tuân; Vietnam
Women's singles	Zeng Jian; Singapore	Suthasini Sawettabut; Thailand	Orawan Paranang; Thailand
Women's singles	Zeng Jian; Singapore	Suthasini Sawettabut; Thailand	Nguyễn Khoa Diệu Khánh; Vietnam
Men's doubles	Singapore; Koen Pang; Izaac Quek	Malaysia; Javen Choong; Wong Qi Shen	Philippines; John Russel Picondo; Richard Pugoy Gonzales
Men's doubles	Singapore; Koen Pang; Izaac Quek	Malaysia; Javen Choong; Wong Qi Shen	Singapore; Beh Kun Ting; Ethan Poh
Women's doubles	Thailand; Orawan Paranang; Suthasini Sawettabut	Singapore; Wong Xin Ru; Zhou Jingyi	Malaysia; Alice Chang Li Sian; Im Li Ying
Women's doubles	Thailand; Orawan Paranang; Suthasini Sawettabut	Singapore; Wong Xin Ru; Zhou Jingyi	Singapore; Ser Lin Qian; Goi Rui Xuan
Mixed doubles	Vietnam; Đinh Anh Hoàng; Trần Mai Ngọc	Singapore; Clarence Chew Zhe Yu; Zeng Jian	Thailand; Sarayut Tancharoen; Wanwisa Aueawiriyayothin
Mixed doubles	Vietnam; Đinh Anh Hoàng; Trần Mai Ngọc	Singapore; Clarence Chew Zhe Yu; Zeng Jian	Thailand; Padasak Tanviriyavechakul; Tamolwan Khetkuan
Men's team	Singapore; Koen Pang; Ethan Poh; Clarence Chew Zhe Yu; Izaac Quek	Malaysia; Javen Choong; Leong Chee Feng; Wong Qi Shen	Thailand; Padasak Tanviriyavechakul; Sarayut Tancharoen; Phakpoom Sanguansin
Men's team	Singapore; Koen Pang; Ethan Poh; Clarence Chew Zhe Yu; Izaac Quek	Malaysia; Javen Choong; Leong Chee Feng; Wong Qi Shen	Vietnam; Đoàn Bá Tuấn Anh; Nguyễn Anh Tú; Nguyễn Đức Tuân
Women's team	Thailand; Orawan Paranang; Suthasini Sawettabut; Jinnipa Sawettabut	Malaysia; Karen Lyne Dick; Alice Chang Li Sian; Ho Ying	Singapore; Goi Rui Xuan; Ser Lin Qian; Zhou Jingyi
Women's team	Thailand; Orawan Paranang; Suthasini Sawettabut; Jinnipa Sawettabut	Malaysia; Karen Lyne Dick; Alice Chang Li Sian; Ho Ying	Vietnam; Nguyễn Khoa Diệu Khánh; Nguyễn Thị Nga; Trần Mai Ngọc
