= Leong Mee Wan =

Malaysian table tennis player (born 1966)

Personal information
- Born: August 12, 1966 (age 59) Kinta District, Perak, Malaysia

Sport
- Sport: Table tennis
Medal record
Representing Malaysia
Southeast Asian Games
Gold medal – first place	1987 Jakarta	Women's doubles
Gold medal – first place	1989 Kuala Lumpur	Women's singles
Bronze medal – third place	1987 Jakarta	Women's team

Leong Mee Wan
- Traditional Chinese: 梁美雲
- Simplified Chinese: 梁美云
Transcriptions
Standard Mandarin
- Hanyu Pinyin: Liáng Měiyún
Yue: Cantonese
- Jyutping: Loeng^{4} Mei^{5} Wan^{4}
Southern Min
- Hokkien POJ: Niô͘ Bí-hûn
- Tâi-lô: Niôo Bí-hûn

Leong Mee Wan (Chinese: 梁美云, born 12 August 1966) is a Malaysian retired table tennis player.

She competed in the 1988 Summer Olympics in both women's singles and doubles (with Lau Wai Cheng) events. She and Lau were the doubles winners in the 1987 Southeast Asian Games. Leong was also the women's singles champion at the 1989 Southeast Asian Games.
