= Malaysia at the 1969 SEAP Games =

Malaysia at the 1969 Southeast Asian Peninsular Games
- IOC code: MAS
- NOC: Olympic Council of Malaysia
- Website: www.olympic.org.my (in English)

in Rangoon
- Competitors: 189 in 15 sports
- Medals Ranked 4th: Gold 16 Silver 24 Bronze 39 Total 79

Southeast Asian Peninsular Games appearances
- 1959; 1961; 1965; 1967; 1969; 1971; 1973; 1975; 1977; 1979; 1981; 1983; 1985; 1987; 1989; 1991; 1993; 1995; 1997; 1999; 2001; 2003; 2005; 2007; 2009; 2011; 2013; 2015; 2017; 2019; 2021; 2023; 2025; 2027; 2029

Malaysia competed in the 1969 Southeast Asian Peninsular Games held in Rangoon, Burma from 6 to 13 December 1969. It won 16 gold, 24 silver and 39 bronze medals.

== Medal summary ==
=== Medals by sport ===
Sport	Gold	Silver	Bronze	Total	Rank
Athletics	7	0	0	7	
Badminton	5	2	0	7	1
Basketball	1	0	0	1	1
Football	0	0	1	1	3
Table tennis	3	1	2	6	1
Total	16	24	39	79	4

=== Medallists ===
Medal	Name	Sport	Event
Gold	Dilbagh Singh Kler	Athletics	Men's 3000 metres steeplechase
Gold	Ishtiaq Mubarak	Athletics	Men's 110 metres hurdles
Gold	Abdul Rahman Zambrose	Athletics	Men's 400 metres hurdles
Gold	Nashatar Singh Sidhu	Athletics	Men's shot put
Gold	Nashatar Singh Sidhu	Athletics	Men's javelin throw
Gold	K. Thirumai	Athletics	Men's 50 kilometres road walk
Gold		Athletics	Men's 4 × 100 metres relay
Gold	Punch Gunalan	Badminton	Men's singles
Gold	Sylvia Ng Meow Eng	Badminton	Women's singles
Gold	Ng Boon Bee; Tan Yee Khan	Badminton	Men's doubles
Gold	Rosalind Singha Ang; Teoh Siew Yong	Badminton	Women's doubles
Gold	Ng Boon Bee; Rosalind Singha Ang	Badminton	Mixed doubles
Gold	Malaysia national basketball team	Basketball	Women's tournament
Gold	Soong Poh Wah	Table tennis	Men's singles
Gold		Table tennis	Women's team
Gold		Table tennis	
Silver	Sylvia Ng Meow Eng; Khaw Gaik Bee	Badminton	Women's doubles
Silver	Yew Cheng Hoe; Khaw Gaik Bee	Badminton	Mixed doubles
Silver	Soong Poh Wah; Lim Hee Peng	Table tennis	Men's doubles
Bronze	Malaysia national football team: Chow Chee Keong; Abdullah Nordin; Foe Fook Chuan; Sadar Khan; M. Chandran; Chan Yong Chong; Wong Fook Yoong; Ibrahim Mydin; Saharuddin Abdullah; Wong Choon Wah; Zulkifli Norbit; Namat Abdullah; Lim Kim Lian; Harun Yusoff; Yap Eng Kok; Soo Toh Kim Poh; Lee Soe Phang; N. Thanabalan	Football	Men's tournament
Bronze	Chong Suk Fong	Table tennis	Women's singles
Bronze	Ong Mei Mei	Table tennis	Women's singles
