= Vietnam at the 1997 SEA Games =

Vietnam at the 1997 Southeast Asian Games
- IOC code: VIE
- NOC: Vietnam Olympic Committee
- Website: www.voc.org.vn (in Vietnamese and English)

in Jakarta
- Competitors: 595 in 24 sports
- Medals Ranked 5th: Gold 35 Silver 48 Bronze 50 Total 133

Southeast Asian Games appearances (overview)
- 1989; 1991; 1993; 1995; 1997; 1999; 2001; 2003; 2005; 2007; 2009; 2011; 2013; 2015; 2017; 2019; 2021; 2023; 2025; 2027; 2029

Vietnam competed in the 1997 Southeast Asian Games held in Jakarta, Indonesia from 11 to 19 December 1997.
