= Wong Hung Nung =

Former player in Malaysia

Wong Hung Nung is Malaysian former footballer and golfer.

== Career ==
Wong was regarded as an important defender for the Malaysia national football team and became a golfer after playing football.
