= Ling Ling Agustin =

Indonesian table tennis player (born 1969)

Personal information
- Nationality: Indonesian
- Born: 23 August 1969 (age 55); Kediri, Indonesia

Sport
- Sport: Table tennis

Ling Ling Agustin Minangmojo (born 23 August 1969) is an Indonesian former table tennis player. She competed in the women's singles event at the 1992 Summer Olympics.
