= Low Hong Eng =

First woman executed for drug trafficking in Singapore

- Low Hong Eng, the first female drug trafficker to be hanged in Singapore
- Born: Low Hong Eng c. 1946; Colony of Singapore
- Died: 9 October 1981 (aged 35); Changi Prison, Singapore
- Cause of death: Execution by hanging
- Occupation: Seamstress
- Spouse: Unnamed husband
- Children: 4
- Status: Executed
- Conviction: Drug trafficking (one count)
- Criminal charges: Trafficking of 459.3 g (16.20 oz) of diamorphine
- Penalty: Death (mandatory; x1)

Low Hong Eng (Chinese: 刘凤英; pinyin: Líu Fèngyīng; c. 1946 – 9 October 1981) was a Singaporean seamstress and mother of four who was sentenced to death for drug trafficking in Singapore. Low and her accomplice Tan Ah Tee (alias Tan Kok Ser), a Malaysian illegal taxi driver, were both caught smuggling 459.3g of diamorphine (or pure heroin) at Dickson Road, Jalan Besar in September 1976. Both Low and Tan were found guilty and sentenced to hang on 22 September 1978; Low became the second woman to be given the death penalty for drug trafficking since 1975. Low subsequently lost her appeals against the death sentence, and eventually, both Low and her co-accused were hanged on 9 October 1981, making Low the first female drug trafficker of Singaporean descent to be officially put to death in Singapore since 1975, after the mandatory death penalty was introduced for drug trafficking.

== Biography ==
Low Hong Eng was born in Singapore in 1946, and she was married with four children during her adulthood. Low was working as a seamstress at the time of her arrest.

== Drug charges ==
On 6 September 1976, 30-year-old Low Hong Eng and a 30-year-old illegal taxi driver named Tan Ah Tee (Chinese: 陈亚弟; pinyin: Chén Yàdì; alias Tan Kok Ser (Chinese: 陈国仕; pinyin: Chén Guóshì)), a Malaysian from Johor Bahru, were charged in court for trafficking 1.5 kg of drugs after their arrests three days before.

The amount of drugs trafficked by the pair was later tested and found to contain diamorphine (or pure heroin) that weighed 459.3g, which was nearly 31 times the minimum amount of 15g that mandated the death penalty under the Misuse of Drugs Act, which was amended in 1975 to allow judges to impose death for drug traffickers. On the same date when Low and Tan were charged, another man named Tan Weng Guan (aged 40) was also charged for smuggling morphine and diamorphine.

The arrests of the trio was described to be the Central Narcotics Bureau's breakthrough in busting one of the largest drug syndicates that operated in the country.

Less than five months after their arrests, both Low and Tan were committed to stand trial after a preliminary hearing on 4 January 1977.

== Death penalty trial ==
On 19 September 1978, Low Hong Eng and Tan Ah Tee both stood trial at the High Court for trafficking 459.3g of diamorphine. Justice A. P. Rajah and Justice Choor Singh were appointed as the two trial judges to preside the hearing. John Tan Chor-Yong represented Tan while Thomas Tham represented Low, while the prosecution was led by Sowaran Singh.

The trial court was told that on the morning of 3 September 1976, the same date when they were arrested, Low met up with Tan to help deliver the drugs after she was offered S$100 to complete the task. Two undercover narcotics officers – Teo Ho Peng and Cheong Wah Chow – had a car with a Malaysian registration plates under surveillance near Block A of the Far East Mansions on Kim Yam Road. At around 10:25am, the officers spotted Tan and Low emerging from Block A, and Low was seen receiving a bag containing the drugs from Tan before they drove away in the Malaysian-registered car. Cheong and Teo trailed the duo on a motorcycle before they arrested the duo after the car arrived at Dickson Road, Jalan Besar. Although the two accused initially confessed to having trafficked drugs, Low and Tan alleged in court that their statements were made involuntarily, and their defence counsels sought to challenge the admissibility of the statements.

Both Low and Tan were later called to give their defence, after the High Court ruled the statements admissible. Tan testified that he was asked by a friend named Ah Pooi to bring a package to Ah Pooi's wife in Singapore, and he did not check the contents of the package due to his close relationship with the friend and had trusted him a lot, and it was only after his arrest when he found out that he was carrying diamorphine in his possession without his knowledge. Low herself stated that she was acquainted with Ah Pooi and his wife, and on the day of her arrest, Low was supposed to meet Ah Pooi's wife, who agreed to help her find a job as a maid, and she only met Ah Pooi instead, and Ah Pooi asked her to accompany him to receive a package that would be delivered to his wife, and by the time Tan arrived, Low was alone at the meeting point in Kim Yam Road to receive the package as Ah Pooi had not returned after taking a temporary leave.

On 22 September 1978, Justice A. P. Rajah and Justice Choor Singh delivered their judgement after a four-day trial. In their verdict, the two judges rejected the defences of Low and Tan, and they were of the opinion that Tan and Low had the knowledge that they were carrying diamorphine at the time of the arrests, and ruled that the prosecution had proven their case beyond a reasonable doubt. Hence, both 32-year-old Low Hong Eng and 32-year-old Tan Ah Tee were found guilty of drug trafficking and sentenced to death.

Low became the second woman to be sentenced to hang for drug trafficking in Singapore since 1975. Just five weeks before, in August 1978, 18-year-old Siti Aminah Jaafar became the first female drug trafficker in Singapore to be sentenced to death alongside her 25-year-old lover Anwar Ali Khan in an unrelated case of trafficking 43.5g of diamorphine in May 1977. Subsequently, Siti was granted clemency by then President Devan Nair and had her sentence commuted to life imprisonment in February 1983, while Anwar was hanged on 4 March 1983 after his plea for clemency failed.

As of April 1979, Low and Tan were among the 29 people held on death row for murder and drug trafficking at Singapore's Changi Prison, the only prison in Singapore to carry out judicial executions by hanging, the only method of execution legalized for use under Singaporean law.

== Appeals ==
In June 1979, Low Hong Eng and Tan Ah Tee appealed to the Court of Appeal against their convictions and sentences, with Francis Seow representing them while Glenn Knight took over the prosecution’s case. Four months later, in October 1979, the Court of Appeal's three judges – Chief Justice Wee Chong Jin, Justice F. A. Chua (Frederick Arthur Chua) and Justice T. Kulasekaram – dismissed the appeals.

Subsequently, Low and Tan applied for special leave to appeal to the Privy Council in London, but the Privy Council refused to review their cases and hence dismissed their appeals. Subsequently, both Low and Tan appealed to the President of Singapore for clemency, seeking to commute their sentences to life imprisonment, but their pleas were rejected, and thus both Low and Tan failed in their final bid to escape the gallows.

== Execution ==
On 9 October 1981, after eating their last breakfast, 35-year-old Low Hong Eng and 35-year-old Tan Ah Tee were hanged in Changi Prison at dawn. Low was the first Singaporean woman to be executed for drug trafficking since 1975. Both Tan and Low were the tenth and 11th persons to be put to death under the Misuse of Drugs Act since 1975. Low was also the first female to be executed for drug trafficking in the whole region of Southeast Asia; her case was followed by 51-year-old Lim Boey Nooi who smuggled 974g of diamorphine in Malaysia; Lim was the first female drug convict hanged in Malaysia on 8 October 1982 since the country's enactment of capital punishment for drug crimes. Eight more drug traffickers remained on death row awaiting execution as of February 1982, four months since the hangings of Low and Tan.

== See also ==
- Capital punishment in Singapore
- List of major crimes in Singapore
- Misuse of Drugs Act (Singapore)
