= Ismu Harinto =

Indonesian table tennis player

Personal information
- Nationality: Indonesian
- Born: May 16, 1974 (age 52) Klaten, Indonesia
- Height: 1.71 m (5 ft 7 1/2 in)
- Weight: 60 kg (130 lb; 9.4 st)

Sport
- Sport: Table tennis
- Playing style: Right-hand shakehand grip
Medal record
Men's Table Tennis
Representing Indonesia
Southeast Asian Games
Silver medal – second place	2001 Kuala Lumpur	Singles
Bronze medal – third place	1997 Jakarta	Doubles
Bronze medal – third place	2001 Kuala Lumpur	Doubles
Bronze medal – third place	2003 Vietnam	Doubles
Bronze medal – third place	2003 Vietnam	Team

Ismu Harinto (born 16 May 1974) is an Indonesian table tennis player. He competed in the men's doubles event at the 2000 Summer Olympics.
