= Lau Wai Cheng =

Malaysian table tennis player

Personal information
- Nationality: Malaysian
- Born: 3 June 1967 (age 57)

Sport
- Sport: Table tennis

Lau Wai Cheng (born 3 June 1967) is a Malaysian table tennis player. She competed in the women's singles event at the 1988 Summer Olympics.
