= Anton Suseno =

Indonesian table tennis player

Personal information
- Nationality: Indonesian
- Born: 15 December 1971 (age 54) Indramayu, Indonesia
- Height: 1.78 m (5 ft 10 in)
- Weight: 70 kg (150 lb; 11 st)

Sport
- Sport: Table tennis
- Playing style: Right-hand shakehand grip
Medal record
Men's Table Tennis
Representing Indonesia
Southeast Asian Games
Gold medal – first place	1991 Manila	Singles
Gold medal – first place	1993 Singapore	Singles
Gold medal – first place	1999 Bandar Seri Begawan	Doubles
Silver medal – second place	1995 Chiang Mai	Mixed doubles
Silver medal – second place	1999 Bandar Seri Begawan	Singles
Bronze medal – third place	1989 Kuala Lumpur	Singles
Bronze medal – third place	1991 Manila	Doubles
Bronze medal – third place	1999 Bandar Seri Begawan	Team

Anton Suseno (born 15 December 1971) is an Indonesian table tennis player. He competed at the 1992 Summer Olympics, the 1996 Summer Olympics, and the 2000 Summer Olympics.
