= Rossy Pratiwi Dipoyanti =

Indonesian table tennis player (born 1972)

Personal information
- Full name: Rossy Pratiwi Dipoyanti Sheikh Abu Bakr
- Born: June 28, 1972 (age 54) Bandung, Central Java, Indonesia
- Spouse: Rany Kristiono (m. 2001)

Sport
- Country: Indonesia
- Sport: Table tennis
- Coached by: Diana Wuisan

Achievements and titles
- National finals: PON XI 1985: – 1 Silver, 1 Bronze; PON XII 1989: – 4 Gold; PON XIII 1993: – 3 Gold, 1 Bronze; PON XIV 1996: – 1 Silver, 3 Bronze; PON XV 2000: – 4 Silver; PON XVI 2004: – 1 Silver, 2 Bronze; PON XVII 2008: – 2 Bronze
- Highest world ranking: 17 (29 July 1992)
Medal record
Women's table tennis
Representing Indonesia
Event	1st	2nd	3rd
Southeast Asian Games	13	8	8
Total	13	8	8
Southeast Asian Games
Gold medal – first place	1987 Jakarta	Singles
Gold medal – first place	1987 Jakarta	Mixed doubles
Gold medal – first place	1989 Kuala Lumpur	Team
Gold medal – first place	1989 Kuala Lumpur	Doubles
Gold medal – first place	1991 Manila	Singles
Gold medal – first place	1991 Manila	Mixed doubles
Gold medal – first place	1993 Singapore	Singles
Gold medal – first place	1993 Singapore	Doubles
Gold medal – first place	1993 Singapore	Mixed doubles
Gold medal – first place	1993 Singapore	Team
Gold medal – first place	1995 Chiang Mai	Doubles
Gold medal – first place	1995 Chiang Mai	Team
Gold medal – first place	1997 Jakarta	Team
Silver medal – second place	1987 Jakarta	Team
Silver medal – second place	1987 Jakarta	Doubles
Silver medal – second place	1989 Kuala Lumpur	Singles
Silver medal – second place	1991 Manila	Doubles
Silver medal – second place	1991 Manila	Team
Silver medal – second place	1995 Chiang Mai	Singles
Silver medal – second place	1997 Jakarta	Singles
Silver medal – second place	1997 Jakarta	Doubles
Bronze medal – third place	1989 Kuala Lumpur	Mixed doubles
Bronze medal – third place	1995 Chiang Mai	Mixed doubles
Bronze medal – third place	1997 Jakarta	Mixed doubles
Bronze medal – third place	1999 Brunei	Doubles
Bronze medal – third place	1999 Brunei	Mixed doubles
Bronze medal – third place	1999 Brunei	Team
Bronze medal – third place	2001 Kuala Lumpur	Doubles
Bronze medal – third place	2001 Kuala Lumpur	Team

Rossy Pratiwi Dipoyanti Sheikh Abu Bakr or better known as Rossy Pratiwi Dipoyanti or Rossy Sheikh Abu Bakr (born in Bandung on 28 June 1972) is an Indonesian table tennis player who collected 13 gold medals, 8 silver medals and 8 bronze medals during her career throughout the year 1987–2001 at the Southeast Asian Games. In addition, she also managed to collect 7 gold medals, 7 silver medals, and 9 bronze medals during her career throughout the year 1985–2008 at the National Sports Week. The highest achievement of her career at table tennis was when she was ranked 17th in the women's singles and women's doubles with Ling Ling Agustin at the 1992 Summer Olympics in Barcelona.

At the 1989 Southeast Asian Games in Kuala Lumpur, Malaysia, Rossy, who was playing as an Indonesian table tennis athlete of the women's singles number, chose a walkout in the final against the host athlete on 25 August 1989. It was suspected because of the fraud committed by Goh Kun Tee as a referee from Malaysia who gave free score to the host athlete. Even though a ball from Rossy's blow grabbed thinly on the lip of the table, but the referee said come out and give a score for opponent Rossy, Leong Mee Wan. Chairman of the All-Indonesia Table Tennis Union at that time, Ali Said who was in the arena of the game directly instructed athletes and Indonesian table tennis officials to resign.

After retiring in 2009, throughout the year 2010-2014 Rossy is active as a national table tennis coach. Rossy is entrusted with coaching the Indonesian women's table tennis team at the 26th SEA Games of 2011 in Palembang and coaching the table tennis national team at the Olympic pre-qualification in Bangkok, Thailand on 4–5 February 2012.

== Biography ==
=== Early life ===
Rossy Pratiwi Dipoyanti was born in Bandung, West Java as the first child of six siblings. She comes from Ba 'Alawi sada family of Hadhrami Arabs surnamed Aal bin Sheikh Abu Bakr bin Salem (Arabic: آل بن شيخ أبو بكر, romanized: Aāl bin Shāīkh Abū Bakr; Arabic pronunciation: [ʔaːl bin ʃæjx aːbuː bakr]), her father was Ali Umar bin Sheikh Abu Bakr, while her mother was a Sundanese woman named Neni Nurlaeni.

=== Personal life ===
In 2001, Rossy married a Javanese man named Rany Kristiono. Rany is a basketball athlete who played in Hadtex Bandung club (Garuda Flexi Bandung in present day), and last played in Satya Wacana Angsapura club. Both were meet at the Century Park Hotel Jakarta when Rossy was in the 1994 Asian Games training center which was held at the hotel, while Rany was in the 1994 Basketball Competition and stayed at the same hotel. From his marriage to Rany, Rossy was blessed with 4 daughters, they are Diva Marcella Maharani, Najwa Julianoer Qayrani, Jasmine Aprillia Khirani, dan Nayla Julia Aisyahrani. She did not force her children to play table tennis or basketball, like her eldest son, Diva Marcella Maharani (born on March 26, 2002) who claimed to be more interested in art than sports. Even so, Rossy still hopes that one of his four children will follow her parents footsteps as an athlete.

== Career ==
=== Early career ===
Rossy's love of table tennis began when her father, Ali Umar bin Sheikh Abu Bakr played in his yard. Rossy then introduced to the world of table tennis since the second grade of elementary school by her father. She started her playing table tennis career from intercity match. During the fourth grade of elementary school she entered the Triple V club, where she then got to know Diana Wuisan, one of Indonesia's legendary table tennis athletes. Diana who saw Rossy potentially big on table tennis then invites her to enter the Sanjaya Gudang Garam Table Tennis Association club in Kediri, East Java. Upon the support of her parents, Rossy then left her birthplace, Bandung for having to live in Gudang Garam dormitory, Kediri until graduate high school (for about seven years).

In Kediri, Rossy began to be trained through various competitions, including when she will attend the 2nd Asian Junior Championship in Nagoya, Japan, on 1–6 April 1986. In the tournament, the Indonesian women's team is only ranked sixth, below Taiwan, Japan, North Korea, South Korea and China.

=== National Sports Week ===
In 1985, when she was 13 years old, Rossy began achievement in various national tournaments, ranging from regional championships to National Sports Week. Throughout her career from 1985 to 2008 in the National Sports Week, Rossy once represented East Java, East Kalimantan, West Java, Lampung, and South Sumatra. In addition, she also managed to collect 7 gold medals, 7 silver medals, and 9 bronze medals during her career at the National Sports Week.

==== Achievement ====
Year	Tournament	Host	Representatives of	Results			
Year	Tournament	Host	Representatives of	WS	WD	MD	WT
1985	11th National Sports Week	Jakarta	East Java	-	-	Bronze medal	Silver medal
1989	12th National Sports Week	Jakarta	East Java	Gold medal	Gold medal	Gold medal	Gold medal
1993	13th National Sports Week	Jakarta	East Kalimantan	Gold medal	Gold medal	Bronze medal	Gold medal
1996	14th National Sports Week	Jakarta	West Java	Bronze medal	Bronze medal	Bronze medal	Silver medal
2000	15th National Sports Week	Surabaya	West Java	Silver medal	Silver medal	Silver medal	Silver medal
2004	16th National Sports Week	Palembang	Lampung	Bronze medal	Silver medal	-	Bronze medal
2008	17th National Sports Week	Samarinda	South Sumatra	-	Bronze medal	-	Bronze medal
Notes: WS : Women's singles, WD : Women's doubles, MD : Mixed doubles, WT : Women's team.; 1st winner, gold medal; 2nd winner, silver medal; 3rd winner, bronze medal.

=== SEA Games ===
Rossy's debut at the SEA Games began when she was just 15 years old, precisely at the 1987 Southeast Asian Games in Jakarta. While going to the 1987 SEA Games, Rossy and other Indonesian teams first attended the national training camp held by the All-Indonesia Table Tennis Union in North Korea. Under the training of Kang Nung-ha, Rossy is not only trained physically but also mentally. As a result, she won two golds from the women's singles and mixed doubles, while the two silver she got from the women's doubles and women's team. During her career throughout 1987–2001 at the Southeast Asian Games, she managed to collect 13 gold medals, 8 silver medals, and 8 bronze medals.

At the 15th SEA Games in 1989 in Kuala Lumpur, due to referee cheating who gave free scores to the host athlete, Rossy who was playing as an Indonesian table tennis athlete of the women's singles finally chose a walkout in the final against Leong Mee Wan on 25 August 1989. Chronology of cheating occurred in the second set because act of Goh Kun Tee as Malaysian referee who issued a controversy decision, whereas in the first set of the game went normal even though the match was won by Rossy with thin score, 17–16. The second set runs fiercely, when return ball from Mee Wan falls on her right side, Rossy launches a forehand drive. Ball from Rossy's blow grabbed thinly on the lip of the table, but the referee said come out and give a score for Leong Mee Wan. The Indonesian team manager, RM Nuryanto, immediately protested the controversy decision, but the referee remained on his decision. Despite having won two golds (in the women's singles and women's doubles) and one bronze (in the mixed doubles), Rossy remained disappointed and cried to her coach, Diana Wuisan, because the women's singles number was her flagship.

In the middle of a crowded audience, chairman of the All-Indonesia Table Tennis Union, Ali Said who was in the arena of the game immediately instructed that athletes and table tennis officials of Indonesia to resign. With shed a tear he said that Indonesia did not want to be trampled by Malaysia, so they chose to leave the game. Chairman of the Olympic Council of Malaysia at that time, Hamzah Abu Samah even criticized the walkout action conducted by the Indonesian table tennis team. He considered the action would damage the goal of the SEA Games, namely to increase the spirit of friendship between countries in Southeast Asia.

Yap Yong Yih as honorary referee then reported the incident to the organizing committee of SEA Games. Although in the end Goh Kun Tee changed his decision after discussions with assistant referee Cyril Sen, but that does not mean anything because Rossy and table tennis officials of Indonesia have already left the game. Result, Leong Mee Wan still as the first winner and got a gold medal, while Rossy got a silver medal.

=== Asian Games, Asian Championships, and World Championships ===
At the 1994 Asian Games in Hiroshima, Rossy brought the Indonesian table tennis women's team to sixth place. In addition, Rossy also repeatedly brought Indonesian women's teams into the top 10 at the Asian Table Tennis Championships. In the 1987 World Table Tennis Championships in India, 1989 in Germany, 1991 in Japan, 1993 in Sweden, 1995 in China, and 1997 in England, Indonesia's women's table tennis team was always in Division 2. Then at the 2000 World Team Table Tennis Championships in Malaysia and 2001 in Japan, Indonesian table tennis women's team rose to Division 1 and ranked 17–20.

=== Summer Olympics ===
Throughout her career, Rossy twice represented Indonesia for the Olympics, namely the 1992 Summer Olympics in Barcelona and the 1996 Summer Olympics in Atlanta.

At the 1992 Summer Olympics in Barcelona, Rossy appeared in women's singles and women's doubles paired with Ling Ling Agustin. Four weeks before the Olympics, Rossy faced obstacles for having to be hospitalized for a week when had an appendectomy. After returning home from the hospital, she then underwent a weeklong recovery at home. Actually doctors advise Rossy to not physical activity first, but the advice was ignored by her. Without the permission of the doctor, Rossy was still doing the exercises for two weeks before the Olympics. Nevertheless, Rossy still scent the name of Indonesia, because although she did not bring home medals, but she managed to occupy the world 17th rank for the women's singles number, and occupied the same position for the women's doubles with Ling Ling Agustin. While on the women's singles who represented by Ling Ling Agustin and the men's singles who represented by Anton Suseno, Indonesia ranked 33rd.

At the 1996 Summer Olympics in Atlanta, Rossy appeared in the women's singles number and was ranked 49th. Despite failing to bring home a medal, Rossy remains proud because trusted to carry the 1996 Summer Olympics torch with runner Ethel Hudson. They bring the torch with a run along the 500 meter route as a representative of Indonesia.

== Other activities ==
After retiring in 2009, Rossy still wrestle in the world of table tennis. Throughout the year 2010–2014 Rossy is active as a national table tennis coach. Rossy is trusted to coaching the Indonesian table tennis women's team at the 26th Southeast Asian Games in 2011 in Palembang and coaching the Olympic prequalification team in Bangkok, Thailand on 4–5 February 2012. In addition, Rossy also coached the South Sumatra table tennis women's team and became a table tennis coach for civil servants throughout of West Java. At the 11th Asia Pacific Veterans Table Tennis Championships at Yaizu, Shizuoka, Rossy played in women's singles and women's doubles with Ling Ling Agustin, but lost by Taiwan in the last eight.

In education world, in 2001 Rossy graduated as a Social Bachelor (S.Sos.) From the department of State Administration, College of Administrative Sciences Bagasasi, Bandung. He was appointed as a civil servant in Musi Banyuasin Regency, South Sumatra in 2005. He then settled there while training local table tennis athletes until 2012. In 2012, Rossy and her family moved to the birthplace of her husband in Bogor. There, Rossy worked at the Department of Sanitation and Garden of Bogor City, then transferred to the Department of Youth and Sports of Bogor City as Section Head of Breeding and Sportsmanship since 2017.
