= Equestrian at the 2010 Asian Games – Individual eventing =

Individual eventing at the 2010 Asian Games
- Venue: Guangzhou Equestrian Venue
- Date: 18–20 November 2010
- Competitors: 30 from 7 nations

Medalists
gold medal	Kenki Sato	Japan
silver medal	Cheon Jai-sik	South Korea
bronze medal	Yoshiaki Oiwa	Japan

Individual eventing equestrian at the 2010 Asian Games was held in Guangzhou Equestrian Venue, Guangzhou, China from November 18 to November 20, 2010.

== Schedule ==
All times are China Standard Time (UTC+08:00)

Date	Time	Event
Thursday, 18 November 2010	12:00	Dressage
Friday, 19 November 2010	09:00	Cross-country
Saturday, 20 November 2010	13:00	Jumping

== Results ==
Legend

- EL — Eliminated
- RT — Retired

=== Qualification ===
Rank	Athlete	Horse	Dressage	Cross-country			1st jumping			Total
Rank	Athlete	Horse	Dressage	Jump	Time	Total	Jump	Time	Total	Total
1	Kenki Sato (JPN)	Toy Boy	42.30			0.00			0.00	42.30
2	Yoshiaki Oiwa (JPN)	Noonday de Conde	43.80			0.00			0.00	43.80
3	Nina Ligon (THA)	Chai Thai	40.60			0.00	4		4.00	44.60
4	Cheon Jai-sik (KOR)	Thomas O´Mally2	47.10			0.00			0.00	47.10
5	Atsushi Negishi (JPN)	Nid'Or Barbereau	47.30			0.00			0.00	47.30
6	Promton Kingwan (THA)	Nice Nelly U	42.70			0.00	8		8.00	50.70
7	Liang Ruiji (CHN)	Cervanto2	47.70			0.00	4		4.00	51.70
8	Alena Bobrovskaya (KAZ)	Carry Bredshow	47.90			0.00	4		4.00	51.90
9	Yang Hua (CHN)	Caro Ciaro	53.10			0.00			0.00	53.10
10	Nicole Fardel (HKG)	The Navigator	53.30			0.00			0.00	53.30
11	Takayuki Yumira (JPN)	Marquis de Plescop	54.20			0.00			0.00	54.20
12	Annie Ho (HKG)	Undulette	54.40			0.00			0.00	54.40
13	Ali Al-Marri (QAT)	Juste D'Adaelle	54.20		0.80	0.80			0.00	55.00
14	Pavel Sergeyev (KAZ)	Balzam	57.30			0.00			0.00	57.30
15	Chan Sai Kin (HKG)	Castell 4	57.50			0.00			0.00	57.50
16	Song Sang-wuk (KOR)	Lutine de Brenil	51.30			0.00	8		8.00	59.30
17	Li Jingmin (CHN)	Zhendeyi	58.10			0.00		2	2.00	60.10
18	Liu Tongyan (CHN)	Siqin Tariha	60.40			0.00			0.00	60.40
19	Kim Houng-hun (KOR)	Dragon 85	60.80			0.00			0.00	60.80
20	Terri Impson (THA)	Windswept	52.30			0.00	12		12.00	64.30
21	Vladimir Chekalin (KAZ)	Hellani	61.50			0.00	4		4.00	65.50
22	Jennifer Lee (HKG)	Strong Scotch	61.90			0.00	4		4.00	65.90
23	Heo Jun-sung (KOR)	Heaps of Hope	52.70	20		20.00			0.00	72.70
24	Namchok Jantakad (THA)	Clifton Zengarie	60.20	20	1.20	21.20			0.00	81.40
25	Tatsuya Kusanagi (JPN)	Jenny Black	50.80	40		40.00	4		4.00	94.80
26	Weerapat Pitakanonda (THA)	Monarch Royal T.	70.80	20		20.00	12		12.00	102.80
27	Abdulla Al-Marri (QAT)	Drum Mousse	64.40	20	18.00	38.00	16		16.00	118.40
—	Valeriy Chekalin (KAZ)	Arhond	63.50			RT				RT
—	Ahmed Al-Badi (QAT)	Wait and See Ze	61.90			EL				EL
—	Faisal Al-Marri (QAT)	Graffiti de Lully	59.20			EL				EL

=== Final jumping ===
Rank	Athlete	Horse	After 1st jumping	Final jumping			Total
Rank	Athlete	Horse	After 1st jumping	Jump	Time	Total	Total
1st place, gold medalist(s)	Kenki Sato (JPN)	Toy Boy	42.30			0.00	42.30
2nd place, silver medalist(s)	Cheon Jai-sik (KOR)	Thomas O´Mally2	47.10			0.00	47.10
3rd place, bronze medalist(s)	Yoshiaki Oiwa (JPN)	Noonday de Conde	43.80	4		4.00	47.80
4	Nina Ligon (THA)	Chai Thai	44.60	4		4.00	48.60
5	Yang Hua (CHN)	Caro Ciaro	53.10			0.00	53.10
6	Liang Ruiji (CHN)	Cervanto2	51.70		2	2.00	53.70
7	Song Sang-wuk (KOR)	Lutine de Brenil	59.30			0.00	59.30
8	Annie Ho (HKG)	Undulette	54.40	8		8.00	62.40
9	Alena Bobrovskaya (KAZ)	Carry Bredshow	51.90	12		12.00	63.90
10	Nicole Fardel (HKG)	The Navigator	53.30	12	2	14.00	67.30
11	Pavel Sergeyev (KAZ)	Balzam	57.30	4	9	13.00	70.30
12	Ali Al-Marri (QAT)	Juste D'Adaelle	55.00	16		16.00	71.00
13	Promton Kingwan (THA)	Nice Nelly U	50.70	16	19	35.00	85.70
14	Abdulla Al-Marri (QAT)	Drum Mousse	118.40	4		4.00	122.40
