= Malaysia at the 2007 SEA Games =

Malaysia at the 2007 Southeast Asian Games
- IOC code: MAS
- NOC: Olympic Council of Malaysia
- Website: www.olympic.org.my (in English)

in Nakhon Ratchasima
- Competitors: 428 in 39 sports
- Flag bearer: Hairul Azreen (taekwondo)
- Officials: 294
- Medals Ranked 2nd: Gold 68 Silver 52 Bronze 96 Total 216

Southeast Asian Games appearances (overview)
- 1959; 1961; 1965; 1967; 1969; 1971; 1973; 1975; 1977; 1979; 1981; 1983; 1985; 1987; 1989; 1991; 1993; 1995; 1997; 1999; 2001; 2003; 2005; 2007; 2009; 2011; 2013; 2015; 2017; 2019; 2021; 2023; 2025; 2027; 2029

Malaysia competed in the 2007 Southeast Asian Games held in Nakhon Ratchasima, Thailand from 6 to 15 December 2007.

== Medal summary ==
=== Medals by sport ===
Sport	Gold	Silver	Bronze	Total	Rank
Archery	2	2	1	5	2
Athletics	7	3	9	19	4
Badminton	0	0	4	4	4
Basketball	1	0	1	2	1
Billiards and snooker	1	3	2	6	4
Bowling	4	3	6	13	1
Boxing	0	2	3	5	3
Cycling	4	5	4	13	3
Dancesport	0	0	1	1	3
Diving	7	2	2	11	1
Equestrian	4	2	1	7	1
Fencing	0	0	2	2	6
Futsal	0	1	0	1	2
Golf	0	0	2	2	3
Gymnastics	6	4	9	19	3
Handball	0	0	2	2	3
Hockey	2	0	0	2	1
Judo	0	0	3	3	8
Karate	8	3	5	16	1
Lawn bowls	4	1	1	6	1
Pencak silat	0	1	6	7	5
Pétanque	0	0	3	3	5
Polo	1	0	0	1	1
Sailing	2	2	4	8	3
Shooting	2	3	5	10	4
Squash	1	1	0	2	1
Swimming	7	8	8	23	3
Table tennis	0	1	2	3	4
Taekwondo	2	1	5	8	3
Tennis	0	0	1	1	5
Triathlon	1	0	0	1	3
Volleyball	0	0	1	1	4
Weightlifting	0	1	1	2	5
Wushu	2	2	1	5	3
Total	68	52	96	216	2

=== Medallists ===
Medal	Name	Sport	Event	Date
Gold	Cheng Chu Sian	Archery	Men's individual recurve	11 Dec
Gold	Cheng Chu Sian; Muhammad Marbawi; Wan Khalmizam	Archery	Men's team recurve	12 Dec
Gold	Rayzam Shah Wan Sofian	Athletics	Men's 110 metres hurdles	10 Dec
Gold	Krishnan Amran Raj; Mohd Zafril Mohd Zuslaini; Muhammad Zaiful Zainal Abidin; Subramaniam Thipan	Athletics	Men's 4 × 400 metres relay	8 Dec
Gold	Teoh Boon Lim	Athletics	Men's 20 kilometres road walk	9 Dec
Gold	Lee Hup Wei	Athletics	Men's high jump	11 Dec
Gold	Yuan Yufang	Athletics	Women's 20 kilometres road walk	9 Dec
Gold	Roslinda Samsu	Athletics	Women's pole vault	11 Dec
Gold	Siti Shahida Abdullah	Athletics	Women's hammer throw	10 Dec
Gold	Malaysia national basketball team: Beh Siew Lian; Chan Ying Chee; Chow Sion Foong; Goh Beng Fong; Hee Shook Ying; Kew Suik May; Lee Siew Fun; Low Bee Chuan; Pow Yann Yann; Teo Woon Yien; Yong Shin Min	Basketball	Women's tournament	13 Dec
Gold	Moh Keen Hoo	Billiards and snooker	Men's snooker singles	14 Dec
Gold	Esther Cheah; Zatil Iman Abdul Ghani	Bowling	Women's doubles	9 Dec
Gold	Esther Cheah; Shalin Zulkifli; Zatil Iman Abdul Ghani	Bowling	Women's trios	10 Dec
Gold	Esther Cheah; Shalin Zulkifli; Sharon Koh; Siti Safiyah Amirah; Zatil Iman Abdul Ghani	Bowling	Women's team of five	11 Dec
Gold	Shalin Zulkifli; Zulmazran Zulkifli	Bowling	Mixed doubles	14 Dec
Gold	Mohd Rizal Tisin	Cycling	Men's 1000 metre time trial	10 Dec
Gold	Josiah Ng	Cycling	Men's individual sprint	12 Dec
Gold	Mohd Rizal Tisin; Junaidi Mohamad Nasir; Muhammad Edrus Md Yunos	Cycling	Men's team sprint	10 Dec
Gold	Amir Mustafa Rusli; Mohd Jasmin Ruslan; Mohammad Akmal Amrun; Mohd Harrif Saleh	Cycling	Men's team pursuit	12 Dec
Gold	Yeoh Ken Nee	Diving	Men's 1 metre springboard	14 Dec
Gold	Yeoh Ken Nee	Diving	Men's 3 metre springboard	13 Dec
Gold	Bryan Nickson Lomas	Diving	Men's 10 metre platform	14 Dec
Gold	Rossharisham Roslan; Yeoh Ken Nee	Diving	Men's synchronised 3 metre springboard	14 Dec
Gold	Leong Mun Yee	Diving	Women's 1 metre springboard	13 Dec
Gold	Elizabeth Jimie; Leong Mun Yee	Diving	Women's synchronised 3 metre springboard	14 Dec
Gold	Cheong Jun Hoong; Pandelela Rinong	Diving	Women's synchronised 10 metre platform	14 Dec
Gold	Qabil Ambak Mahamad Fathil	Equestrian	Individual dressage	9 Dec
Gold	Diani Lee Cheng Ni; Nur Quzandria Mahamad Fathil; Putri Alia Soraya; Qabil Ambak Mahamad Fathil	Equestrian	Team dressage	7 Dec
Gold	Qabil Ambak Mahamad Fathil	Equestrian	Individual show jumping	11 Dec
Gold	Qabil Ambak Mahamad Fathil; Quzier Ambak Mahamad Fathil; Syed Omar Al-Mahdzar; Syazna Leena Zulhasnan	Equestrian	Team show jumping	10 Dec
Gold	Ooi Wei Siang	Gymnastics	Men's horizontal bar	10 Dec
Gold	Chan Sau Wah	Gymnastics	Women's uneven bars	10 Dec
Gold	Foong Seow Ting; Jaime Lee Yoke Jeng; Chrystal Lim Wen Chean; Wan Siti Haniza Wan Izahar	Gymnastics	Women's rhythmic team all-around	13 Dec
Gold	Chrystal Lim Wen Chean	Gymnastics	Women's rhythmic clubs	15 Dec
Gold	Chrystal Lim Wen Chean	Gymnastics	Women's rhythmic ribbon	15 Dec
Gold	Chrystal Lim Wen Chean	Gymnastics	Women's rhythmic rope	15 Dec
Gold	Malaysia men's national field hockey team: Baljit Singh Sarjab; G. Sasitheran; K. Keevan Raj; Khairulnizam Ibrahim; Kuhan Shanmuganathan; Muhammad Abdul Aziz; Muhammad Razie Abdul Rahim; Nabil Fiqri Mohammad Noor	Hockey	Men's tournament	13 Dec
Gold	Malaysia women's national field hockey team	Hockey	Women's tournament	13 Dec
Gold	Ku Jin Keat	Karate	Men's individual kata	12 Dec
Gold	Puvaneswaran Ramasamy	Karate	Men's individual kumite 55 kg	12 Dec
Gold	Lim Yoke Wai	Karate	Men's individual kumite 65 kg	12 Dec
Gold	Mahendran Supremaniam	Karate	Men's individual kumite 75 kg	13 Dec
Gold	Lim Yoke Wai	Karate	Men's individual kumite open weight	13 Dec
Gold	Lim Lee Lee	Karate	Women's individual kata	12 Dec
Gold	Jamalliah Jamaluddin	Karate	Women's individual kumite over 60 kg	13 Dec
Gold	Yamini Gopalasamy	Karate	Women's individual kumite open weight	13 Dec
Gold	Azim Azami Mohd Ariffin; Mohd Amir Mohd Yusof	Lawn bowls	Men's pairs	12 Dec
Gold	Fairul Izwan Abd Muin; Mohd Azwan Shuhaimi; Zulhilmie Redzuan	Lawn bowls	Men's triples	12 Dec
Gold	Azlina Arshad; Emma Firyana Saroji	Lawn bowls	Women's pairs	12 Dec
Gold	Maisarah Aminludin; Nur Fidrah Noh; Nor Hashimah Ismail	Lawn bowls	Women's triples	12 Dec
Gold	Shaik Reismann Mohamas Ismail; Tengku Ahmed Shazril Tengku Sulaiman; Zulkhairi Kofle; Saladin Mazlan; Md Adyrizal Md Zamri; Jabir Mohd Ali Moiz	Polo	Men's tournament	15 Dec
Gold	Mohd Rormzi Muhamad	Sailing	Men's laser	14 Dec
Gold	Nurul Elia Anuar	Sailing	Open laser radial	14 Dec
Gold	Hafiz Adzha; Hasli Izwan Amir Hasan; Mohd Ridzuan Mohamed	Shooting	Men's team 25 metre rapid fire pistol	
Gold	Haslisa Hamed; Nur Ain Ibrahim; Nur Suryani Taibi	Shooting	Women's team 50 metre rifle prone	
Gold	Elvinn Keo Jinn Chung	Squash	Men's singles	10 Dec
Gold	Daniel Bego	Swimming	Men's 200 metre freestyle	11 Dec
Gold	Daniel Bego	Swimming	Men's 100 metre butterfly	9 Dec
Gold	Chui Lai Kwan	Swimming	Women's 50 metre freestyle	11 Dec
Gold	Khoo Cai Lin	Swimming	Women's 400 metre freestyle	8 Dec
Gold	Khoo Cai Lin	Swimming	Women's 800 metre freestyle	9 Dec
Gold	Lew Yih Wey	Swimming	Women's 200 metre backstroke	7 Dec
Gold	Siow Yi Ting	Swimming	Women's 200 metre individual medley	7 Dec
Gold	Elaine Teo Shueh Fhren	Taekwondo	Women's flyweight (51 kg)	14 Dec
Gold	Che Chew Chan	Taekwondo	Women's middleweight (72 kg)	12 Dec
Gold	Kimberley Yap Fui Li	Triathlon	Women's individual	9 Dec
Gold	Diana Bong Siong Lin	Wushu	Women's nanquan	10 Dec
Gold	Chai Fong Ying	Wushu	Women's taijiquan	9 Dec
Silver	Wan Khalmizam	Archery	Men's individual recurve	11 Dec
Silver	Anbarasi Subramaniam; Irza Hanie Abu Samah; Noor Aziera Taip	Archery	Women's team recurve	12 Dec
Silver	Mahendran Vadivellan	Athletics	Men's 1500 metres	11 Dec
Silver	Moh Siew Wei	Athletics	Women's 100 metres hurdles	10 Dec
Silver	Ngew Sin Mei	Athletics	Women's triple jump	11 Dec
Silver	Moh Loon Hong; Roslan Yurnalis	Billiards and snooker	Men's English billiards doubles	
Silver	Moh Keen Hoo; Yong Kein Foot	Billiards and snooker	Men's snooker doubles	
Silver	Moh Loon Hong; Thor Chuan Leong; Yong Kein Foot	Billiards and snooker	Men's snooker team	7 Dec
Silver	Alex Liew	Bowling	Men's singles	8 Dec
Silver	Aaron Kong; Adrian Ang; Alex Liew; Daniel Lim; Zulmazran Zulkifli	Bowling	Men's team of five	
Silver	Esther Cheah	Bowling	Women's masters	13 Dec
Silver	Zamzai Azizi Mohamad	Boxing	Men's light flyweight (48 kg)	12 Dec
Silver	Mohammad Farkhan Mohd Haron	Boxing	Men's welterweight (69 kg)	12 Dec
Silver	Azizulhasni Awang	Cycling	Men's 1000 metre time trial	
Silver	Azizulhasni Awang	Cycling	Men's individual sprint	12 Dec
Silver	Amir Mustafa Rusli	Cycling	Men's individual pursuit	11 Dec
Silver	Uracca Leow Hoay Sim	Cycling	Women's individual pursuit	11 Dec
Silver	Suhardi Hassan	Cycling	Men's individual road race massed start	13 Dec
Silver	Rossharisham Roslan	Diving	Men's 3 metre springboard	13 Dec
Silver	Leong Mun Yee	Diving	Women's 3 metre springboard	12 Dec
Silver	Nur Quzandria Mahamad Fathil	Equestrian	Individual dressage	9 Dec
Silver	Amir Zulkefle; Edric Lee; Johari Lee; Lingesparan Suppiah	Equestrian	Team eventing	15 Dec
Silver	Malaysia national futsal team	Futsal	Men's tournament	13 Dec
Silver	Ooi Wei Siang	Gymnastics	Men's artistic individual all-around	
Silver	Chan Sau Wah	Gymnastics	Women's balance beam	
Silver	Chrystal Lim Wen Chean	Gymnastics	Women's rhythmic individual all-around	14 Dec
Silver	Chrystal Lim Wen Chean	Gymnastics	Women's rhythmic hoop	15 Dec
Silver	Kunasilan Lakanathan; Lim Yoke Wai; Mahendran Supremaniam; Mohd Hatta Mahamut; Oayaseelah Vijayakumar; Puvaneswaran Ramasamy; Shaharudin Jamaludin	Karate	Men's team kumite	14 Dec
Silver	Yamini Gopalasamy	Karate	Women's individual kumite 60 kg	13 Dec
Silver	Chin Fang Yin; Lim Lee Lee; Thoe Ai Poh	Karate	Women's team kata	12 Dec
Silver	Siti Zalina Ahmad	Lawn bowls	Women's singles	12 Dec
Silver	Rina Jordana Adnan	Pencak silat	Women's 50 kg	12 Dec
Silver	Nurul Ain Md Isa; Noor Balqis Yaacop	Sailing	Women's international 470	
Silver	Mohd Nazrin Muiz Mohd Asri	Sailing	Men's optimist	
Silver	Hasli Izwan Amir Hasan	Shooting	Men's 25 metre rapid fire pistol	
Silver	Muslifah Zulkifli; Nur Suryani Taibi; Shahera Rahim Raja	Shooting	Women's team 10 metre air rifle	
Silver	Nur Suryani Taibi	Shooting	Women's 50 metre rifle prone	
Silver	Mohd Nafiizwan Adnan	Squash	Men's singles	10 Dec
Silver	Daniel Bego	Swimming	Men's 100 metre freestyle	8 Dec
Silver	Leung Chii Lin	Swimming	Women's 50 metre freestyle	
Silver	Louisa Los Santos	Swimming	Women's 100 metre butterfly	
Silver	Siow Yi Ting	Swimming	Women's 100 metre breaststroke	
Silver	Siow Yi Ting	Swimming	Women's 200 metre breaststroke	10 Dec
Silver	Siow Yi Ting	Swimming	Women's 400 metre individual medley	11 Dec
Silver	Heidi Gan; Khoo Cai Lin; Leung Chii Lin; Siow Yi Ting	Swimming	Women's 4 × 100 metre freestyle relay	
Silver	Chai Sook Fun; Leung Chii Lin; Louisa Los Santos; Siow Yi Ting	Swimming	Women's 4 × 100 metre medley relay	10 Dec
Silver	Ng Sock Khim	Table tennis	Women's singles	10 Dec
Silver	Ryan Chong Wy Lunn	Taekwondo	Men's bantamweight (62 kg)	13 Dec
Silver	Che Mohd Azrul Che Mat	Weightlifting	Men's +105 kg	12 Dec
Silver	Lim Yew Fai; Ng Say Yoke; Wee Jung Jieh	Wushu	Men's duilian	
Silver	Ng Shin Yii	Wushu	Women's taijiquan	9 Dec
Bronze	Mohd Kaharuddin Ashah; Lau Siew Hong; Soo Teck Kim; Ting Leong Foong	Archery	Men's team compound	
Bronze	Mohd Noor Imran Abdul Hadi	Athletics	Men's 100 metres	7 Dec
Bronze	Muhammad Zaiful Zainal Abidin	Athletics	Men's 400 metres	11 Dec
Bronze	Mohd Jironi Ridzuan	Athletics	Men's 800 metres	
Bronze	Mohd Faiz Mohamed	Athletics	Men's 110 metres hurdles	10 Dec
Bronze	Arif Naim Jeffry; Mohd Noor Imran Abdul Hadi; Mohd Latif Nyat; Mohd Zabidi Ghazali	Athletics	Men's 4 × 100 metres relay	10 Dec
Bronze	Mohd Shahrul Amri Suhaimi	Athletics	Men's long jump	10 Dec
Bronze	Ahmad Najwan Aqra	Athletics	Men's high jump	11 Dec
Bronze	Azizah Ibrahim; Noor Hazwanie Norizan; Norjannah Hafiszah Jamaluddin; Siti Fatimah Mohamad	Athletics	Women's 4 × 100 metres relay	10 Dec
Bronze	Ngew Sin Mei	Athletics	Women's long jump	8 Dec
Bronze	Julia Wong Pei Xian	Badminton	Women's singles	14 Dec
Bronze	Gan Teik Chai; Lin Woon Fui	Badminton	Men's doubles	14 Dec
Bronze	Malaysia national badminton team	Badminton	Men's team	10 Dec
Bronze	Malaysia national badminton team	Badminton	Women's team	10 Dec
Bronze	Malaysia national basketball team: Abdul Kader Mohd Yusoff; Ang Tun Kaw; B. Gunaneswara; Chee Li Wei; Chong Yow Keen; Chow Kin Hoong; Francis Loh; Koh Way Tek; Koo Chen Jye; Lau Bik Ing; Satyaseelan Kuppusamy; Soo Eng Heng; Tan Kian Hoong; Toh Chin Thiam	Basketball	Men's tournament	
Bronze	Beh Shun Ting; Luk Teck Hua	Beach volleyball	Women's doubles	15 Dec
Bronze	Ibrahim Amir	Billiards and snooker	Men's eight-ball pool singles	
Bronze	Ibrahim Amir; Lee Poh Soon	Billiards and snooker	Men's nine-ball pool doubles	
Bronze	Zulmazran Zulkifli	Bowling	Men's singles	8 Dec
Bronze	Aaron Kong; Zulmazran Zulkifli	Bowling	Men's doubles	9 Dec
Bronze	Adrian Ang; Aaron Kong; Zulmazran Zulkifli	Bowling	Men's trios	10 Dec
Bronze	Zulmazran Zulkifli	Bowling	Men's masters	13 Dec
Bronze	Shalin Zulkifli	Bowling	Women's singles	8 Dec
Bronze	Shalin Zulkifli; Siti Safiyah Amirah	Bowling	Women's doubles	9 Dec
Bronze	Mohammad Ali Abdul Karim	Boxing	Men's flyweight (51 kg)	9 Dec
Bronze	Eddey Kalai	Boxing	Men's featherweight (57 kg)	9 Dec
Bronze	Paunandes Paulus	Boxing	Men's lightweight (60 kg)	
Bronze	Fatehah Mustapa	Cycling	Women's 500 metre time trial	10 Dec
Bronze	Fatehah Mustapa	Cycling	Women's individual sprint	12 Dec
Bronze	Fatehah Mustapa; Noor Azian Alias; Ruszatulzanariah Md Yusof	Cycling	Women's team sprint	
Bronze	Uracca Leow Hoay Sim	Cycling	Women's points race	
Bronze	Yong Kwok Leong; Gooi Yee Zhen	Dancesport	Latin American Rumba	8 Dec
Bronze	Rossharisham Roslan	Diving	Men's 1 metre springboard	14 Dec
Bronze	Elizabeth Jimie	Diving	Women's 1 metre springboard	13 Dec
Bronze	Amir Zulkefle	Equestrian	Individual eventing	15 Dec
Bronze	Zairul Zaimi Mohd Arsad	Fencing	Men's individual foil	
Bronze	Koh I Jie; Azroul Fazly Mohamed Yusoff; Amir Mohd Yunos; Ruberchandran Ramachandran	Fencing	Men's team épée	11 Dec
Bronze	Akhmal Tarmizee Mohd Nazari	Golf	Men's individual	13 Dec
Bronze	Ainil Bakar	Golf	Women's individual	13 Dec
Bronze	Ooi Wei Siang	Gymnastics	Men's rings	
Bronze	Ooi Wei Siang	Gymnastics	Men's vault	
Bronze	Lum Wan Foong; Mohd Azlanshah Ismail; Mohd Azzam Azmi; Mohd Shahril Johari; Onn Kwang Tung; Ooi Wei Siang	Gymnastics	Men's artistic team all-around	7 Dec
Bronze	Chan Sau Wah; Loh Hui Xin; Nabihah Ali; Noor Hasleen Fatihin Hasnan; Nurul Fatiha Abdul Hamid; Tracie Ang	Gymnastics	Women's artistic team all-around	
Bronze	Foong Seow Ting	Gymnastics	Women's rhythmic individual all-around	14 Dec
Bronze	Foong Seow Ting	Gymnastics	Women's rhythmic clubs	15 Dec
Bronze	Jaime Lee Yock Jeng	Gymnastics	Women's rhythmic hoop	15 Dec
Bronze	Foong Seow Ting	Gymnastics	Women's rhythmic ribbon	15 Dec
Bronze	Foong Seow Ting	Gymnastics	Women's rhythmic rope	15 Dec
Bronze	Malaysia men's national handball team	Handball	Men's tournament	12 Dec
Bronze	Malaysia men's national handball team	Handball	Women's tournament	
Bronze	Mohd Fakhrul Afandi	Judo	Men's 66 kg	
Bronze	Marjan Abdullah	Judo	Men's 73 kg	
Bronze	Noor Maizura Zainon	Judo	Women's 48 kg	
Bronze	Shaharudin Jamaludin	Karate	Men's individual kumite 70 kg	13 Dec
Bronze	Cheah Boon Chong; Ku Jin Keat; Tan Chee Sheng	Karate	Men's team kata	12 Dec
Bronze	Anthony Vasantha Marial	Karate	Women's individual kumite 48 kg	12 Dec
Bronze	Vathana Gopalasamy	Karate	Women's individual kumite 53 kg	12 Dec
Bronze	Anthony Vasantha Marial; Vathana Gopalasamy; Yamini Gopalasamy; Yugneswary Govindasamy	Karate	Women's team kumite	14 Dec
Bronze	Safuan Said	Lawn bowls	Men's singles	12 Dec
Bronze	Ahmad Shahril Zailudin	Pencak silat	Men's 65 kg	12 Dec
Bronze	Faizal Abdullah	Pencak silat	Men's 80 kg	12 Dec
Bronze	Wan Nurul Hidayu Wan Abdulrajak	Pencak silat	Women's 55 kg	12 Dec
Bronze	Malini Mohamad	Pencak silat	Women's 60 kg	12 Dec
Bronze	Emy Latip	Pencak silat	Women's 65 kg	12 Dec
Bronze	Mastura Sapuan	Pencak silat	Women's +65 kg	12 Dec
Bronze	Saiful Bahri Musmin	Pétanque	Men's shooting	7 Dec
Bronze	Rabiah Abd Rahman	Pétanque	Women's singles	
Bronze	Roslina Abdul Rashid; Wan Sazimah Wan Yaacob	Pétanque	Women's doubles	
Bronze	Ku Anas Ku Zamil; Amir Muizz Jamaluddin	Sailing	Men's international 470	
Bronze	Alissa Chew	Sailing	Women's optimist	
Bronze	Mohd Nazrin Muiz Mohd Asri; Alissa Chew; Khairunnisa Mohd Affendy; Koh Boon Quan; Khairul Nizam Mohd Affendy	Sailing	Mixed team racing optimist	
Bronze	Hairuddin Han	Sailing	Men's super mod	
Bronze	Hafiz Adzha	Shooting	Men's 25 metre rapid fire pistol	
Bronze	Mohd Hamelay Mutalib; Mohd Sabki; Ahmad Aqqad Yahya	Shooting	Men's team 50 metre rifle three positions	
Bronze	Nur Suryani Taibi	Shooting	Women's 50 metre rifle three positions	
Bronze	Haslisa Hamed; Nur Ain Ibrahim; Nur Suryani Taibi	Shooting	Women's team 50 metre rifle three positions	
Bronze	Chen Seong Fook; Leong Wei Heng; Yeoh Cheng Han	Shooting	Men's team trap	
Bronze	Daniel Bego	Swimming	Men's 200 metre butterfly	11 Dec
Bronze	Daniel Bego; Eric Chang; Kevin Lim; Kevin Yeap	Swimming	Men's 4 × 200 metre freestyle relay	7 Dec
Bronze	Lew Yih Wey	Swimming	Women's 800 metre freestyle	
Bronze	Chai Sook Fun	Swimming	Women's 100 metre backstroke	
Bronze	Marellyn Liew	Swimming	Women's 100 metre butterfly	
Bronze	Hii Siew Siew	Swimming	Women's 200 metre butterfly	11 Dec
Bronze	Lew Yih Wey	Swimming	Women's 400 metre individual medley	11 Dec
Bronze	Heidi Gan; Khoo Cai Lin; Lew Yih Wey; Ong Ming Xiu	Swimming	Women's 4 × 200 metre freestyle relay	7 Dec
Bronze	Chai Kian Beng; Muhd Shakirin Ibrahim	Table tennis	Men's doubles	
Bronze	Beh Lee Wei; Chiu Soo Jiin; Gam Gaik Ding; Ng Sock Khim	Table tennis	Women's team	5 Dec
Bronze	Kader Sultan Mohamad Hafiz	Taekwondo	Men's finweight (54 kg)	
Bronze	Wong Kai Meng	Taekwondo	Men's middleweight (84 kg)	
Bronze	Rozy Khamis	Taekwondo	Men's heavyweight (+84 kg)	
Bronze	Norfaradila Mohammad Zairy	Taekwondo	Women's welterweight (67 kg)	
Bronze	Shu Seo Hie	Taekwondo	Women's heavyweight (+72 kg)	
Bronze	Sia Huey Teng; Dorothy Chong; Chellapriya Vythinathan; Jawairiah Noordin	Tennis	Women's team	8 Dec
Bronze	Naharudin Mahayuddin	Weightlifting	Men's 62 kg	9 Dec
Bronze	Tai Cheau Xin	Wushu	Women's nanquan	10 Dec

== Aquatics ==
=== Diving ===
Men

Athlete	Event	Preliminary		Final	
Athlete	Event	Score	Rank	Score	Rank
Rossharisham Roslan	1 m springboard	—N/a		361.50	3rd place, bronze medalist(s)
Yeoh Ken Nee	1 m springboard	—N/a		416.05	1st place, gold medalist(s)
Rossharisham Roslan	3 m springboard	—N/a		435.65	2nd place, silver medalist(s)
Yeoh Ken Nee	3 m springboard	—N/a		444.05	1st place, gold medalist(s)
Bryan Nickson Lomas	10 m platform	—N/a		429.70	1st place, gold medalist(s)
Rossharisham Roslan; Yeoh Ken Nee	3 m synchronized springboard	—N/a		416.76	1st place, gold medalist(s)

Women

Athlete	Event	Preliminary		Final	
Athlete	Event	Score	Rank	Score	Rank
Elizabeth Jimie	1 m springboard	—N/a		263.10	3rd place, bronze medalist(s)
Leong Mun Yee	1 m springboard	—N/a		278.30	1st place, gold medalist(s)
Leong Mun Yee	3 m springboard	—N/a		306.90	2nd place, silver medalist(s)
Elizabeth Jimie; Leong Mun Yee	3 m synchronized springboard	—N/a		281.28	1st place, gold medalist(s)
Cheong Jun Hoong; Pandelela Rinong	10 m synchronized platform	—N/a		293.79	1st place, gold medalist(s)

=== Swimming ===
Men

Athlete	Event	Heats		Final	
Athlete	Event	Time	Overall rank	Time	Rank
Daniel Bego	100 m freestyle			51.53	2nd place, silver medalist(s)
Daniel Bego	200 m freestyle			1:52.32	1st place, gold medalist(s)
Daniel Bego	100 m butterfly			54.33	1st place, gold medalist(s)
Daniel Bego	200 m butterfly			2:03.97	3rd place, bronze medalist(s)
Daniel Bego; Eric Chang; Kevin Lim Kar Meng; Kevin Yeap Soon Choy	4 × 200 m freestyle relay	—N/a		7:43.28	3rd place, bronze medalist(s)

Women

Athlete	Event	Heats		Final	
Athlete	Event	Time	Overall rank	Time	Rank
Chui Lai Kwan	50 m freestyle			26.63	1st place, gold medalist(s)
Leung Chii Lin	50 m freestyle			26.79	2nd place, silver medalist(s)
Khoo Cai Lin	400 m freestyle			4:18.20	1st place, gold medalist(s)
Khoo Cai Lin	800 m freestyle	—N/a		8:47.80	1st place, gold medalist(s)
Lew Yih Wey	800 m freestyle	—N/a		9:00.43	3rd place, bronze medalist(s)
Chai Sook Fun	100 m backstroke			1:06.03	3rd place, bronze medalist(s)
Lew Yih Wey	200 m backstroke			2:17.39 NR	1st place, gold medalist(s)
Siow Yi Ting	100 m breaststroke			1:12.65	2nd place, silver medalist(s)
Siow Yi Ting	200 m breaststroke			2:32.55	2nd place, silver medalist(s)
Marellyn Liew	100 m butterfly			1:02.25	3rd place, bronze medalist(s)
Louisa Los Santos	100 m butterfly			1:02.08	2nd place, silver medalist(s)
Hii Siew Siew	200 m butterfly			2:20.71	3rd place, bronze medalist(s)
Siow Yi Ting	200 m individual medley			2:18.52	1st place, gold medalist(s)
Lew Yih Wey	400 m individual medley			4:55.86	3rd place, bronze medalist(s)
Siow Yi Ting	400 m individual medley			4:54.11	2nd place, silver medalist(s)
Heidi Gan; Khoo Cai Lin; Leung Chii Lin; Siow Yi Ting	4 × 100 m freestyle relay	—N/a		3:54.91	2nd place, silver medalist(s)
Heidi Gan; Khoo Cai Lin; Lew Yih Wey; Ong Ming Xiu	4 × 200 m freestyle relay	—N/a		8:27.13 NR	3rd place, bronze medalist(s)
Chai Sook Fun; Leung Chii Lin; Louisa Los Santos; Siow Yi Ting	4 × 100 m medley relay	—N/a		4:19.33	2nd place, silver medalist(s)

== Baseball ==
=== Men's tournament ===
Team	W	L	PCT	GB	RF	RA	RD
Thailand	5	0	1.000	--	67	6	+61
Philippines	4	1	0.800	1	56	6	+50
Indonesia	3	2	0.600	2	70	10	+60
Myanmar	2	3	0.400	3	31	22	+9
Malaysia	1	4	0.200	4	13	113	-100
Cambodia	0	5	0.000	5	8	88	-80

7 December 9:30 a.m.
Team	1	2	3	4	5	R	H	E
Philippines	4	5	9	10	3	31	21	0
Malaysia	0	0	0	1	0	0	2	10

9 December 9:30 a.m.
Team	1	2	3	4	5	6	R	H	E
Malaysia	0	0	0	1	1	0	2	8	5
Myanmar	2	0	0	7	1	7	17	16	0

10 December 9:30 a.m.
Team	1	2	3	4	5	R	H	E
Indonesia	7	5	8	2	2	24	17	1
Malaysia	0	0	0	0	0	0	1	4

11 December 2:00 p.m.
Team	1	2	3	4	5	6	7	8	9	R	H	E
Malaysia	2	1	0	0	7	0	0	1	0	11	10	1
Cambodia	3	0	0	0	0	0	1	3	0	7	10	8

12 December 2:00 p.m.
Team	1	2	3	4	5	R	H	E
Malaysia	0	0	0	0	0	0	1	6
Thailand	5	5	6	18	x	34	24	0

== Basketball ==
=== Men's tournament ===
Team	Pts.	W	L	PF	PA	PD
Philippines	8	4	0	413	244	+169
Indonesia	7	3	1	284	252	+32
Malaysia	6	2	2	288	315	-27
Thailand	5	1	3	244	282	-38
Cambodia	4	0	4	262	398	-136

Times given below are in Time in Thailand (UTC+7).

7 December
5:00 p.m.

Malaysia	55–70	Indonesia
Scoring by quarter: 18-14, 12-11, 17-22, 8-23

Keelapirom Stadium, Nakhon Ratchasima

8 December
5:00 p.m.

Malaysia	70–65	Thailand
Scoring by quarter: 22-21, 23-17, 12-9, 13-18

Keelapirom Stadium, Nakhon Ratchasima

10 December
3:00 p.m.

Malaysia	103–72	Cambodia
Scoring by quarter: 29-13, 29-21, 28-12, 17-26

Keelapirom Stadium, Nakhon Ratchasima

12 December
5:00 p.m.

Philippines	108–60	Malaysia
Scoring by quarter: 33-14, 22-16, 31-11, 22-17

Keelapirom Stadium, Nakhon Ratchasima

=== Women's tournament ===
Team	Pts.	W	L	PF	PA	PD
Malaysia	6	3	0	195	159	+36
Thailand	5	2	1	210	162	+48
Philippines	4	1	2	177	199	-22
Singapore	3	0	3	145	207	-62

Times given below are in Time in Thailand (UTC+7).

10 December
1:00 p.m.

Malaysia	60–43	Singapore
Scoring by quarter: 15-10, 25-11, 8-10, 12-12

Keelapirom Stadium, Nakhon Ratchasima

12 December
1:00 p.m.

Philippines	56–74	Malaysia
Scoring by quarter: 10-19, 13-19, 16-14, 17-22

Keelapirom Stadium, Nakhon Ratchasima

13 December
5:00 p.m.

Thailand	60–61 (OT)	Malaysia
Scoring by quarter: 13-16, 18-11, 9-11, 15-17, Overtime: 5-6

Keelapirom Stadium, Nakhon Ratchasima

== Football ==
=== Men's tournament ===
Group B

Team	Pld	W	D	L	GF	GA	GD	Pts
Vietnam	3	2	0	1	7	5	+2	6
Singapore	3	1	2	0	5	4	+1	5
Malaysia	3	1	1	1	6	4	+2	4
Laos	3	0	1	2	1	6	−5	1

1 December 2007
15:30 UTC+7

Vietnam	3 – 1	Malaysia
Le Cong Vinh 47', 64'; Vo Duy Nam 80'		Mohd Zaquan Adha Abdul Radzak 69'

Surapala Keetha Sathan
Referee: Napitupulu (Indonesia)

3 December 2007
15:30 UTC+7

Malaysia	4 – 0	Laos
Mohd Amirul Hadi Zainal 69'; Mohd Safee Mohd Sali 76', 90+3'; Mohd Safiq Rahim 84'

Surapala Keetha Sathan
Referee: Alee (Thailand)

8 December 2007
15:30 UTC+7

Malaysia	1 – 1	Singapore
Mohd Amirul Hadi Zainal 71'		Agu Casmir 80'

Surapala Keetha Sathan
Referee: Alee (Thailand)

=== Women's tournament ===
Group B

Team	Pld	W	D	L	GF	GA	GD	Pts
Thailand	2	1	1	0	8	2	+6	4
Myanmar	2	1	1	0	7	2	+5	4
Malaysia	2	0	0	2	0	11	−11	0

2 December 2007
15:15 UTC+7

Thailand	6 – 0	Malaysia
Naphat 9', 25'; Nisa 14'; Pitsamai 53'; Supaporn 87'; Sunisa 89'

Municipality of Tumbon Mueangpug Stadium
Referee: Mai (Vietnam)

4 December 2007
15:15 UTC+7

Malaysia	0 – 5	Myanmar
		Moe Moe War 8'; Khin Marlar Tun 41', 89'; My Nilar Htwe 63'; Maragat Marri 69'

Municipality of Tumbon Mueangpug Stadium
Referee: Mai (Vietnam)
