= Equestrian at the 2010 Asian Games – Team eventing =

Team eventing at the 2010 Asian Games
- Venue: Guangzhou Equestrian Venue
- Date: 18–20 November 2010
- Competitors: 28 from 7 nations

Medalists
gold medal	Japan; Yoshiaki Oiwa, Atsushi Negishi, Takayuki Yumira, Kenki Sato
silver medal	Thailand; Weerapat Pitakanonda, Promton Kingwan, Nina Ligon, Terri Impson
bronze medal	China; Li Jingmin, Liu Tongyan, Yang Hua, Liang Ruiji

Team eventing equestrian at the 2010 Asian Games was held in Guangzhou Equestrian Venue, Guangzhou, China from November 18 to November 20, 2010.

== Schedule ==
All times are China Standard Time (UTC+08:00)

Date	Time	Event
Thursday, 18 November 2010	12:00	Dressage
Friday, 19 November 2010	09:00	Cross-country
Saturday, 20 November 2010	13:00	Jumping

== Results ==
Legend

- EL — Eliminated
- RT — Retired

Rank	Team	Penalties			Total
Rank	Team	Dressage	X-country	Jumping	Total
1st place, gold medalist(s)	Japan (JPN)	133.40	0.00	0.00	133.40
	Yoshiaki Oiwa on Noonday de Conde	43.80	0.00	0.00	43.80
	Atsushi Negishi on Nid'Or Barbereau	47.30	0.00	0.00	47.30
	Takayuki Yumira on Marquis de Plescop	~~54.20~~	~~0.00~~	~~0.00~~	~~54.20~~
	Kenki Sato on Toy Boy	42.30	0.00	0.00	42.30
2nd place, silver medalist(s)	Thailand (THA)	135.60	0.00	24.00	159.60
	Weerapat Pitakanonda on Monarch Royal T.	~~70.80~~	~~20.00~~	~~12.00~~	~~102.80~~
	Promton Kingwan on Nice Nelly U	42.70	0.00	8.00	50.70
	Nina Ligon on Chai Thai	40.60	0.00	4.00	44.60
	Terri Impson on Windswept	52.30	0.00	12.00	64.30
3rd place, bronze medalist(s)	China (CHN)	158.90	0.00	6.00	164.90
	Li Jingmin on Zhendeyi	58.10	0.00	2.00	60.10
	Liu Tongyan on Siqin Tariha	~~60.40~~	~~0.00~~	~~0.00~~	~~60.40~~
	Yang Hua on Caro Ciaro	53.10	0.00	0.00	53.10
	Liang Ruiji on Cervanto2	47.70	0.00	4.00	51.70
4	Hong Kong (HKG)	165.20	0.00	0.00	165.20
	Jennifer Lee on Strong Scotch	~~61.90~~	~~0.00~~	~~4.00~~	~~65.90~~
	Chan Sai Kin on Castell 4	57.50	0.00	0.00	57.50
	Annie Ho on Undulette	54.40	0.00	0.00	54.40
	Nicole Fardel on The Navigator	53.30	0.00	0.00	53.30
5	South Korea (KOR)	159.20	0.00	8.00	167.20
	Heo Jun-sung on Heaps of Hope	~~52.70~~	~~20.00~~	~~0.00~~	~~72.70~~
	Song Sang-wuk on Lutine de Brenil	51.30	0.00	8.00	59.30
	Cheon Jai-sik on Thomas O´Mally2	47.10	0.00	0.00	47.10
	Kim Houng-hun on Dragon 85	60.80	0.00	0.00	60.80
6	Kazakhstan (KAZ)	166.70	0.00	8.00	174.70
	Valeriy Chekalin on Arhond	~~63.50~~	~~RT~~		~~1000.00~~
	Vladimir Chekalin on Hellani	61.50	0.00	4.00	65.50
	Pavel Sergeyev on Balzam	57.30	0.00	0.00	57.30
	Alena Bobrovskaya on Carry Bredshow	47.90	0.00	4.00	51.90
7	Qatar (QAT)	180.50	976.90	16.00	1173.40
	Ahmed Al-Badi on Wait and See Ze	61.90	EL		1000.00
	Ali Al-Marri on Juste D'Adaelle	54.20	0.80	0.00	55.00
	Faisal Al-Marri on Graffiti de Lully	~~59.20~~	~~EL~~		~~1000.00~~
	Abdulla Al-Marri on Drum Mousse	64.40	38.00	16.00	118.40
