= Ryu Su-jeong (archer) =

South Korean archery coach (born 1967)

Personal information
- Nationality: South Korean
- Born: 28 January 1967 (age 59)
- Education: Keimyung University

Sport
- Sport: Archery
- Event: Recurve archery
- Now coaching: Amaya Cojuangco

Korean name
- Hangul: 류수정
- RR: Ryu Sujeong
- MR: Ryu Sujŏng

Ryu Su-jeong (Note: Spelled as either Ryu Su-jeong or Ryu Su Jeng as per World Archery records.) (Korean: 류수정) is a South Korean archery coach.

== Early life and education ==
Ryu Su-jeong was born on 28 January 1967 and grew up in Daegu. She attended the Daegu Myeongdeok Elementary School before studying at the middle school and high school of the all-girls Kyunghwa in Gyeonggi.

She later pursued a degree in physical education at the Keimyung University intending to be a national archery coach. She gradutated in 1989.

== Competitive career ==
Ryu Su-jeong was among the founding members of the archery club of Kyunghwa Girl's High School. Ryu was later selected to represent South Korea in international competitions when she was a second year high schooler after being noticed for her performance in domestic tournaments. She also trained at the Taereung Training Center for six months.

However as she did not garner any notable medals from international competition, and had a hard time in training despite being included as part of the national team at an early age.

== Coaching career ==
Ryu became director of the archery club of Keimyung University in November 1991. Her tenure with the university produced Chang Hye-jin and Seo Min-ki.

Ryu became part of the South Korean national recurve archery coaching staff in January 2010, ahead of the 2010 Asian Games in Guangzhou. She later team coach from 2013 to 2014 and from 2019 to 2021. Under Ryu's watch, Chang won gold in the individual and team events at the 2016 Summer Olympics in Rio de Jainero. She also coached An San who won three gold medals in the 2020 Summer Olympics in Tokyo.

In November 2025, Ryu was brought in to help guide the Philippine archery team in the 2025 SEA Games in Thailand. She decline offers to coach in Mexico and China.

Ryu formally left Keimyung in February 2026. She formally joined the World Athletics Philippines as head coach in March 2026. In July 2026, the Ryu and Hong Sung Chil coached Philippine delegation took part at the Singapore Youth Archery Championships.

She is credited for helping Amaya Cojuangco win a silver medal at the 2026 Asian Games in Japan.

== Personal life ==
Ryu is married to fellow archery coach Im Gyeong-geun who works at Gyeongbuk High School.
