= Amaya Cojuangco =

Filipino archer

Personal information
- Born: Amaya Amparo Paz; November 12, 1985 (age 40)
- Years active: 2005–2007, 2014–present
- Spouse: Enrique Cojuangco Jr.
- Children: 1
- Family: Cojuangco (by marriage)

Sport
- Country: Philippines
- Sport: Archery
- Handedness: Right
- Rank: 221 (2026)

Achievements and titles
- Highest world ranking: 11 (July 2007)
Medal record
Women's compound archery
Representing Philippines
Event	1st	2nd	3rd
Asian Games	0	1	0
SEA Games	4	1	2
Total	4	2	2
Event	1st	2nd	3rd
Women's individual	2	1	0
Women's team	2	0	1
Mixed team	0	0	1
Total	4	1	2
Asian Games
Silver medal – second place	2026 Aichi–Nagoya	Individual
SEA Games
Gold medal – first place	2005 Manila	Individual
Gold medal – first place	2005 Manila	Team
Gold medal – first place	2007 Nakhon Ratchasima	Individual
Gold medal – first place	2007 Nakhon Ratchasima	Team
Silver medal – second place	2015 Singapore	Individual
Bronze medal – third place	2015 Singapore	Team
Bronze medal – third place	2015 Singapore	Mixed team

Amaya Amparo Paz-Cojuangco is a Filipino archer.

== Early life and education ==
Amaya Cojuangco was born on November 12, 1985. She is the younger of the two children of JP Paz and Deda Amparo. She is an athlete having tried football and swimming before taking up archery in 2000 after she and her father watched the sport in the Summer Olympics. She studied at the University of the Philippines Diliman.

== Career ==
Cojuangco was noted at 19-years old for her participation in the 1st Asian Archery Grand Prix in Bangkok, Thailand, where she won all the individual events in the women's compound bow category and two team events.

She won multiple gold medals in the 2005 and 2007 SEA Games.

She took a hiatus from the sport in 2008 to start a family and further extended her absence due to health reasons. Cojuangco then competed in the 2014 and 2018 Asian Games.

Cojuangco took part at the 2022 Asian Games in Hangzhou, China where Aditi Gopichand Swami of India ended her women's archery compound stint in the quarterfinals.

In November 2025, World Archery Philippines brought in coach Ryu Su-jeong to train its national archers including Cojuangco. Ryu reportedly told the team that she will quit her role if Filipino archers don't medal at the 2026 Asian Games in Aichi and Nagoya, Japan.

Cojuangco went on to win a silver medal losing 143–144 to Nurisa Dian Ashrifah of Indonesia in the final. This is the Philippines' first archery Asian Games silver medal and surpassed the bronze medal by Paul dela Cruz in the men's individual compound back in 2014.

== Personal life ==
Amaya is married to Enrique "Kit" Cojuangco Jr., a fellow archer, a politician who has served as vice governor of Tarlac, and son of Henry Cojuangco. They have a son. She lives in Quezon City.
