= Karate at the 2007 SEA Games =

Karate competition

Karate at the SEA Games

Karate at the 2007 SEA Games was held in the Kepkanchana Hall, Chanapolkhan Institute of Technology, Nakhon Ratchasima, Thailand.

== Medal tally ==
* Host nation (Thailand)

Rank	Nation	Gold	Silver	Bronze	Total
1	Malaysia	8	3	5	16
2	Vietnam	6	6	5	17
3	Indonesia	2	4	8	14
4	Thailand*	2	0	5	7
5	Philippines	0	5	6	11
6	Myanmar	0	0	4	4
7	Brunei	0	0	1	1
7	Laos	0	0	1	1
7	Singapore	0	0	1	1
Totals (9 entries)		18	18	36	72

== Medalists ==
=== Kata ===
Event	Gold	Silver	Bronze
Men's individual	Ku Jin Keat; Malaysia	Noel Espinosa; Philippines	Sanphasit Chonlaphan; Thailand
Men's individual	Ku Jin Keat; Malaysia	Noel Espinosa; Philippines	Denies Ibrahim Sani; Indonesia
Women's individual	Lim Lee Lee; Malaysia	Nguyễn Hoàng Ngân; Vietnam	Iin Hasanah; Indonesia
Women's individual	Lim Lee Lee; Malaysia	Nguyễn Hoàng Ngân; Vietnam	Ng Pei Yi; Singapore
Men's team	Indonesia; Aswar; Faizal Zainuddin; Fidelys Lolobua	Vietnam; Lê Xuân Hùng; Nguyễn Bảo Linh; Nguyễn Ngọc Chung	Malaysia; Cheah Boon Chong; Ku Jin Keat; Tan Chee Sheng
Men's team	Indonesia; Aswar; Faizal Zainuddin; Fidelys Lolobua	Vietnam; Lê Xuân Hùng; Nguyễn Bảo Linh; Nguyễn Ngọc Chung	Thailand; Pana Lertcherdchupong; Decha Pisamai; Wutiphol Sintunavarat
Women's team	Vietnam; Nguyễn Hoàng Ngân; Nguyễn Thị Thu Hiền; Vũ Thị Hoàng Thu	Malaysia; Chin Fang Yin; Lim Lee Lee; Thoe Ai Poh	Indonesia; Alit Tresna; Dewi Yulianti; Yanti Yuli Eka
Women's team	Vietnam; Nguyễn Hoàng Ngân; Nguyễn Thị Thu Hiền; Vũ Thị Hoàng Thu	Malaysia; Chin Fang Yin; Lim Lee Lee; Thoe Ai Poh	Thailand; Kalong Buanak; Rattanawadee Lertlob; Morakot Tangkaew

=== Kumite ===
==== Men ====
Event	Gold	Silver	Bronze
−55 kg	Puvaneswaran Ramasamy; Malaysia	Phạm Hoài Long; Vietnam	Ramon Hector Franco; Philippines
−55 kg	Puvaneswaran Ramasamy; Malaysia	Phạm Hoài Long; Vietnam	Bambang Maulidin; Indonesia
−60 kg	Nguyễn Ngọc Thành; Vietnam	Irineo Toribio; Philippines	Yellovin Prasetyo Piscessa; Indonesia
−60 kg	Nguyễn Ngọc Thành; Vietnam	Irineo Toribio; Philippines	Hirannithishatphol Saratham; Thailand
−65 kg	Hairul Azreen; Malaysia	Donny Dharmawan; Indonesia	Rolando Lagman; Philippines
−65 kg	Hairul Azreen; Malaysia	Donny Dharmawan; Indonesia	Võ Mạnh Tuấn; Vietnam
−70 kg	Ismail Aswar; Indonesia	Bùi Việt Bằng; Vietnam	Shaharudin Jamaludin; Malaysia
−70 kg	Ismail Aswar; Indonesia	Bùi Việt Bằng; Vietnam	Thein Htike Aung; Myanmar
−75 kg	Mahendran Supremaniam; Malaysia	Christo Mondolu; Indonesia	Mai Xuân Lượng; Vietnam
−75 kg	Mahendran Supremaniam; Malaysia	Christo Mondolu; Indonesia	Inkhathep Saythansavanh; Laos
+75 kg	Patee Suwansomsri; Thailand	Jose Mari Pabillore; Philippines	Phạm Quang Duy; Vietnam
+75 kg	Patee Suwansomsri; Thailand	Jose Mari Pabillore; Philippines	Hendro Salim; Indonesia
Open	Hairul Azreen; Malaysia	Yulisar Usia Motuty; Indonesia	One Ko Ko Ko Oo; Myanmar
Open	Hairul Azreen; Malaysia	Yulisar Usia Motuty; Indonesia	Vũ Minh Ngọc; Vietnam
Team	Vietnam; Bùi Việt Bằng; Nguyễn Bảo Toàn; Nguyễn Ngọc Thành; Phạm Hoài Long; Phạm Quang Duy; Võ Mạnh Tuấn; Vũ Minh Ngọc	Malaysia; Kunasilan Lakanathan; Hairul Azreen; Mahendran Supremaniam; Mohd Hatta Mahamut; Oayaseelah Vijayakumar; Puvaneswaran Ramasamy; Shaharudin Jamaludin	Indonesia; Bambang Maulidin; Christo Mondolu; Donny Dharmawan; Hendro Salim; Ismail Aswar; Yellovin Prasetyo Piscessa; Yulisar Usia Motuty
Team	Vietnam; Bùi Việt Bằng; Nguyễn Bảo Toàn; Nguyễn Ngọc Thành; Phạm Hoài Long; Phạm Quang Duy; Võ Mạnh Tuấn; Vũ Minh Ngọc	Malaysia; Kunasilan Lakanathan; Hairul Azreen; Mahendran Supremaniam; Mohd Hatta Mahamut; Oayaseelah Vijayakumar; Puvaneswaran Ramasamy; Shaharudin Jamaludin	Philippines; Michael Dumayag; Ricardo Elinon; Joel Gonzaga; Rolando Lagman; Erlando Metante; Sugar Ray Metante; Jose Mari Pabillore

==== Women ====
Event	Gold	Silver	Bronze
−48 kg	Vũ Thị Nguyệt Anh; Vietnam	Martinel Prihastuti; Indonesia	Vasantha Marial Anthony; Malaysia
−48 kg	Vũ Thị Nguyệt Anh; Vietnam	Martinel Prihastuti; Indonesia	Masdiana Haji Tengah; Brunei
−53 kg	Yanisa Torrattanawathana; Thailand	Đào Thị Tú Anh; Vietnam	Vathana Gopalasamy; Malaysia
−53 kg	Yanisa Torrattanawathana; Thailand	Đào Thị Tú Anh; Vietnam	Mae Soriano; Philippines
−60 kg	Nguyễn Thị Hải Yến; Vietnam	Yamini Gopalasamy; Malaysia	Maria Esperanza Manansala; Philippines
−60 kg	Nguyễn Thị Hải Yến; Vietnam	Yamini Gopalasamy; Malaysia	Tantri Widyasari; Indonesia
+60 kg	Jamalliah Jamaludin; Malaysia	Nguyễn Thị Nga; Vietnam	Ni Ni Cho The; Myanmar
+60 kg	Jamalliah Jamaludin; Malaysia	Nguyễn Thị Nga; Vietnam	Cherli Tugday; Philippines
Open	Yamini Gopalasamy; Malaysia	Cherli Tugday; Philippines	Vũ Thị Nguyệt Ánh; Vietnam
Open	Yamini Gopalasamy; Malaysia	Cherli Tugday; Philippines	Yanisa Torrattanawathana; Thailand
Team	Vietnam; Bùi Thị Triệu; Đào Thị Tú Anh; Nguyễn Thị Hải Yến; Vũ Thị Nguyệt Ánh	Philippines; Maria Esperanza Manansala; Lutche Metante; Mae Soriano; Cherli Tugday	Malaysia; Vasantha Marial Anthony; Vathana Gopalasamy; Yamini Gopalasamy; Yugneswary Govindasamy
Team	Vietnam; Bùi Thị Triệu; Đào Thị Tú Anh; Nguyễn Thị Hải Yến; Vũ Thị Nguyệt Ánh	Philippines; Maria Esperanza Manansala; Lutche Metante; Mae Soriano; Cherli Tugday	Myanmar; Nan Saing Main; Ohn Mar Phyo; Thin Thin Thuzar; Yin Hua Thawng Luai
