= Shooting at the 2007 SEA Games =

Shooting at the 2007 SEA Games was held at Shooting Range, Sport Authority of Thailand Sport Complex, Bangkok, Thailand.

== Medal table ==
* Host nation (Thailand)

Rank	Nation	Gold	Silver	Bronze	Total
1	Thailand*	14	16	6	36
2	Singapore	8	6	6	20
3	Vietnam	7	3	11	21
4	Malaysia	2	3	5	10
5	Myanmar	2	2	1	5
6	Philippines	0	3	1	4
7	Indonesia	0	0	2	2
Totals (7 entries)		33	33	32	98

== Medalists ==
=== Men ===
Event	Gold	Silver	Bronze
10 m air pistol	Gai Bin; Singapore	Jakkrit Panichpatikum; Thailand	Trần Quốc Cường; Vietnam
10 m air pistol team	Vietnam; Hoàng Xuân Vinh; Nguyễn Mạnh Tường; Trần Quốc Cường	Thailand; Kasem Khamhaeng; Jakkrit Panichpatikum; Noppadon Sutiviruch	Singapore; Gai Bin; Ho Hung Yi; Poh Lip Meng
25 m standard pistol	Prakarn Karndee; Thailand	Poh Lip Meng; Singapore	Hoàng Xuân Vinh; Vietnam
25 m standard pistol team	Thailand; Prakarn Karndee; Pongpol Kulchairattana; Pruet Sriyaphan	Singapore; Gai Bin; Poh Lip Meng; Rafiee Sairi	Vietnam; Hoàng Xuân Vinh; Lê Doãn Cường; Nguyễn Mạnh Tường
25 m center fire pistol	Hoàng Xuân Vinh; Vietnam	Jakkrit Panichpatikum; Thailand	Nguyễn Mạnh Tường; Vietnam
25 m center fire pistol team	Vietnam; Hoàng Xuân Vinh; Nguyễn Mạnh Tường; Phạm Cao Sơn	Singapore; Gai Bin; On Shaw Ming; Poh Lip Meng	Thailand; Virath Chotitawan; Kasem Khamhaeng; Jakkrit Panichpatikum
25 m rapid fire pistol	Opas Ruengpanyawut; Thailand	Hasli Izwan Amir Hasan; Malaysia	Hafiz Adzha; Malaysia
25 m rapid fire pistol team	Malaysia; Hafiz Adzha; Hasli Izwan Amir Hasan; Mohd Ridzuan Mohamed	Vietnam; Nguyễn Huy Quang Phúc; Phạm Anh Đạt; Phạm Cao Sơn	Thailand; Pongpol Kulchairattana; Opas Ruengpanyawut; Pruet Sriyaphan
50 m pistol	Maung Kyu; Myanmar	Jakkrit Panichpatikum; Thailand	Noppadon Sutiviruch; Thailand
50 m pistol team	Thailand; Saramon Jareangchit; Jakkrit Panichpatikum; Noppadon Sutiviruch	Singapore; Gai Bin; Ho Hung Yi; Poh Lip Meng	Vietnam; Hoàng Xuân Vinh; Nguyễn Mạnh Tường; Trần Quốc Cường
10 m air rifle	Jonath Koh Tien Wei; Singapore	Ong Jun Hong; Singapore	Emerito Concepcion; Philippines
10 m air rifle team	Singapore; Jonath Koh Tien Wei; Ong Jun Hong; Zhang Jin	Thailand; Weerawat Chaisawat; Varavut Majchacheep; Thanapat Thananchai	Vietnam; Nguyễn Duy Hoàng; Nguyễn Tấn Nam; Phạm Ngọc Thanh
50 m rifle prone	Attapon Uea-aree; Thailand	Lin Aung; Myanmar	Nguyễn Tấn Nam; Vietnam
50 m rifle prone team	Thailand; Komkrit Kongnamchok; Tevarit Majchacheep; Attapon Uea-aree	Myanmar; Aung Nyein Ni; Aung Thu Ya; Lin Aung	Singapore; Andy Chee Kwet Chian; Kasmijan Kimin; Ong Jun Hong
50 m rifle 3 positions	Nguyễn Duy Hoàng; Vietnam	Varavut Majchacheep; Thailand	Nguyễn Tấn Nam; Vietnam
50 m rifle 3 positions team	Vietnam; Nguyễn Duy Hoàng; Nguyễn Tấn Nam; Vũ Thanh Hùng	Thailand; Komkrit Kongnamchok; Tevarit Majchacheep; Varavut Majchacheep	Malaysia; Yahya Ahmad Aqqad; Mutalib Hameley; Mohd Din Sabki
Skeet	Jiranunt Hathaichukiat; Thailand	Krisada Varadharmapinich; Thailand	Eugene Chiew Huan Lin; Singapore
Skeet team	Thailand; Jiranunt Hathaichukiat; Pitipoom Phasee; Krisada Varadharmapinich	Philippines; Patricio Bernardo; Paul Brian Rosario; Gabriel Tong	Singapore; David Chan; Eugene Chiew Huan Lin; Lee Yee
Trap	Zain Amat; Singapore	Atig Kitcharoen; Thailand	Lee Wung Yew; Singapore
Trap team	Singapore; Zain Amat; Choo Choon Seng; Lee Wung Yew	Philippines; Eric Ang; Carag Carlos; Jethro Dionisio	Malaysia; Bernard Yeoh Cheng Han; Chen Seong Fook; Leong Wei Heng
Double trap	Choo Choon Seng; Singapore	Tan Chee Keong; Singapore	Athimeth Khamgasem; Thailand
Double trap team	Singapore; Zain Amat; Choo Choon Seng; Tan Chee Keong	Thailand; Athimeth Khamgasem; Yosawat Phakkaanunchai; Patrachatra Vichiensun	not awarded

=== Women ===
Event	Gold	Silver	Bronze
10 m air pistol	Warinya Butcha; Thailand	Tanyaporn Prucksakorn; Thailand	Nguyễn Thu Vân; Vietnam
10 m air pistol team	Thailand; Warinya Butcha; Tanyaporn Prucksakorn; Wanwarin Yusawat	Vietnam; Đặng Lê Ngọc Mai; Đặng Thu Hương; Nguyễn Thu Vân	Singapore; Fan Xiao Ping; Pheong Siew Shya; Zhao Hui Jing
25 m pistol	Nguyễn Thu Vân; Vietnam	Tanyaporn Prucksakorn; Thailand	Warinya Butcha; Thailand
25 m pistol team	Vietnam; Đặng Lê Ngọc Mai; Đặng Thu Hương; Nguyễn Thu Vân	Thailand; Warinya Butcha; Suwaluck Changsanoh; Tanyaporn Prucksakorn	Myanmar; Lay Zar Zar Hlaing; Khin Soe Thaik; Wint May Thu Maun
10 m air rifle	Jasmine Ser Xiang Wei; Singapore	Kusuma Tavisri; Thailand	Thẩm Thúy Hồng; Vietnam
10 m air rifle team	Thailand; Thanyalak Chotphibunsin; Sasithorn Hongprasert; Kusuma Tavisri	Malaysia; Nur Suryani Taibi; Shahera Rahim Raja; Muslifah Zulkifli	Vietnam; Lê Thị Anh Đào; Nguyễn Thị Xuân; Thẩm Thúy Hồng
50 m rifle prone	Than Than Saw; Myanmar	Nur Suryani Taibi; Malaysia	Erlinawati Chalid; Indonesia
50 m rifle prone team	Malaysia; Haslisa Hamed; Nur Ain Ibrahim; Nur Suryani Taibi	Thailand; Thanyalak Chotphibunsin; Sasithorn Hongprasert; Paramaporn Ponglaokham	Indonesia; Erlinawati Chalid; Yosheefin Shila Prasasti; Inca Ferry Wihartanti
50 m rifle 3 positions	Sasithorn Hongprasert; Thailand	Kusuma Tavisri; Thailand	Nur Suryani Taibi; Malaysia
50 m rifle 3 positions team	Thailand; Thanyalak Chotphibunsin; Sasithorn Hongprasert; Kusuma Tavisri	Vietnam; Lê Thị Anh Đào; Nguyễn Thị Hằng; Thẩm Thúy Hồng	Malaysia; Haslisa Hamed; Nur Ain Ibrahim; Nur Suryani Taibi
Skeet	Sutiya Jiewchaloemmit; Thailand	Jaqueline de Guzman; Philippines	Nutchaya Sut-arporn; Thailand
