= Handball at the 2007 SEA Games =

Handball at the 2007 Southeast Asian Games took place at the Nimibutr Gymnasium at the National Sport Complex, Bangkok, Thailand.

== Medal table ==
* Host nation (Thailand)

Rank	Nation	Gold	Silver	Bronze	Total
1	Thailand*	2	0	0	2
2	Vietnam	0	2	0	2
3	Malaysia	0	0	2	2
Totals (3 entries)		2	2	2	6

== Women's tournament ==
Pos	Team	Pld	W	D	L	GF	GA	GD	Pts
1st place, gold medalist(s)	Thailand (H)	3	3	0	0	164	28	+136	6
2nd place, silver medalist(s)	Vietnam	3	2	0	1	171	47	+124	4
3rd place, bronze medalist(s)	Malaysia	3	1	0	2	61	135	−74	2
4	Cambodia	3	0	0	3	18	204	−186	0

(H) Hosts

7 December 2007; 15:30	Thailand	71–1	Cambodia	Nimibutr Stadium, Bangkok
7 December 2007; 15:30		(35–1)		Nimibutr Stadium, Bangkok

7 December 2007; 18:00	Vietnam	62–10	Malaysia	Nimibutr Stadium, Bangkok
7 December 2007; 18:00		(33–6)		Nimibutr Stadium, Bangkok

9 December 2007; 15:30	Malaysia	7–68	Thailand	Nimibutr Stadium, Bangkok
9 December 2007; 15:30		(2–36)		Nimibutr Stadium, Bangkok

9 December 2007; 18:00	Vietnam	89–12	Cambodia	Nimibutr Stadium, Bangkok
9 December 2007; 18:00		(42–3)		Nimibutr Stadium, Bangkok

11 December 2007; 15:30	Malaysia	44–5	Cambodia	Nimibutr Stadium, Bangkok
11 December 2007; 15:30		(21–2)		Nimibutr Stadium, Bangkok

11 December 2007; 18:00	Thailand	25–20	Vietnam	Nimibutr Stadium, Bangkok
11 December 2007; 18:00		(11–8)		Nimibutr Stadium, Bangkok

== Medalists ==
Event	Gold	Silver	Bronze
Men	Thailand (THA); Anek Sombunjit; Athippatai Rattanawan; Chainarong Srisong; Chakkit Photsa-at; Chumphon Chaiwut; Kaewmanee Boonlee; Kaveewat Phachuen; Lapat Chutan; Nattawut Choosongdet; Samarn Sae-lee; Sanit Iamphuchuai; Sarawut Rungruangnara; Sompop Banditpiboon; Tanakorn Ekchiaochan; Taworn Sae-tae; Watcharin Lertnok	Vietnam (VIE); Lam Vu Trung; Le Dinh Hoang; Le Thanh Son; Nguyen Ba Anh; Nguyen Duy Toan; Nguyen Thai Hoa; Nguyen Thanh Tung; Nguyen Van Bien; Nguyen Van Tuyen; Nguyen Van Ty; Pham Duc Vuong; Ta Quoc Viet; To Ha Tri; To Huu Thang; Tran Duc Khiem; Tu Thanh Quang	Malaysia (MAS); Cheo Jun Hou; Foo Chia Chin; Jailani Abrahman; Koh Chan Seng; Kong Chee Onn; Lau Hai Wei; Lee Kua Haow; Ler Thiam Huat; Liang Gin Hua; Raymond Tan; Teh Hup Heng; Toh Yip Fatt; Yap Woon Wai; Yaw Wai Luen; Yeong Sze Hey; Yong Chee Fah
Women	Thailand (THA); Areerat Pinitmontree; Busarakam Sriruksa; Chamaiporn Camjun; Duanjai Thaohom; Jatuporn Phonsen; Jitthita Sipak; Keeratika Lokam; Nantiya Chawdorn; Nattha Suphasanan; Niramon Kramsum; Nuaijan Supaphan; Pattarasiri Thanawat; Preeyanut Bureeruk; Soonyakan Panyim; Supannee Vilasang; Taweeporn Meephian	Vietnam (VIE); Chau Ngoc Thuy Dung; Doan Thi Phuong My; Huynh Thi Kim My; Luong Thanh Vang; Ma Vu Phuc Hanh; Nguyen Minh Thang; Nguyen Ngoc Mai; Nguyen Phuong Thao; Nguyen Thi Huyen Trang; Nguyen Thi Kim Thu; Nguyen Thi Thuy Trang; Nguyen Thi Xuong; Ta Ma Quyen; Truong Hong Ngoc; Truong To Loi; Vo Ngoc Hieu	Malaysia (MAS); Hasuna Noor Azhar; Krystle Lim Siow Vee; Nadimah Arnani Norizan; Natrah Shaheadza Zainal; Noor Afiza Azlina Hamzah; Norazlin Nasir; Norhabsah Noah; Norzila Yusof; Nur Harneena Daud; Nur Sakinah Dalip; Sabrina Zakaria; Salawati Jafar; Salmi Hamzah; Siti Khadijah Ismail; Tuty Noor Asiken Rani; Zalina Yasin Samad
