= Rina Dewi Puspitasari =

Indonesian archer (born 1985)

Personal information
- Born: 5 October 1985 (age 40) Bojonegoro, Indonesia
- Height: 167 cm (5 ft 6 in)
- Weight: 50 kg (110 lb)

Sport
- Country: Indonesia
- Sport: Archery
- Club: Bojonegoro Archery Club
Medal record
Women's archery
Representing Indonesia
SEA Games
Gold medal – first place	2005 Manila	Individual
Gold medal – first place	2007 Nakhon Ratchasima	Women's team
Gold medal – first place	2009 Vientiane	Women's team
Silver medal – second place	2007 Nakhon Ratchasima	Individual

Rina Dewi Puspitasari (born 5 October 1985 in Bojonegoro) is an archer from Indonesia. She competes in archery.

Puspitasari represented Indonesia at the 2004 Summer Olympics. She placed 46th in the women's individual ranking round with a 72-arrow score of 616. In the first round of elimination, she faced 19th-ranked Jennifer Nichols of the United States. Puspitasari lost 160–141 in the 18-arrow match, placing 46th overall in women's individual archery.

At the 2008 Summer Olympics in Beijing Puspitasari finished her ranking round with a total of 620 points. This gave her the 42nd seed for the final competition bracket in which she faced Miroslava Dagbaeva in the first round. Both archers scored a total of 106 points in the regular match and a decisive extra round had to make the difference. In this extra round Dagbaeva scored 10 points while Puspitasari only scored 9 points and was eliminated.
