= Yoshiaki Oiwa =

Japanese equestrian

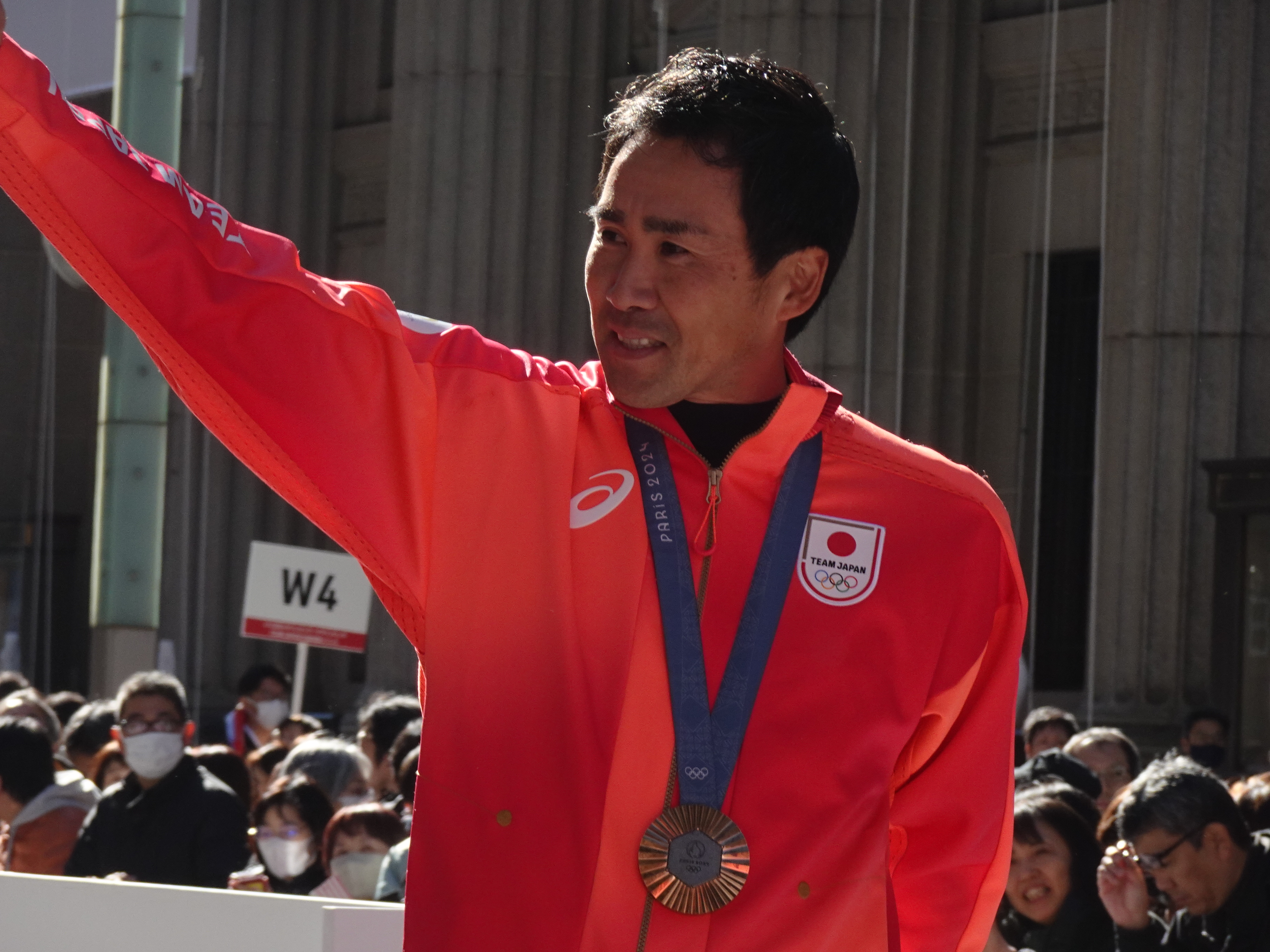
- Oiwa at Paris 2024 Summer Olympians and Paralympians Japan National Team parade event on November 30th, 2024

Personal information
- Born: July 19, 1976 (age 50) Nagoya, Japan
Medal record
Equestrian
Representing Japan
Olympic Games
Bronze medal – third place	2024 Paris	Team eventing
Asian Games
Gold medal – first place	2006 Doha	Individual eventing
Gold medal – first place	2010 Guangzhou	Team eventing
Gold medal – first place	2018 Jakarta	Individual eventing
Gold medal – first place	2018 Jakarta	Team eventing
Silver medal – second place	2006 Doha	Team eventing
Bronze medal – third place	2010 Guangzhou	Individual eventing
Bronze medal – third place	2026 Aichi–Nagoya	Individual eventing

Yoshiaki Oiwa (大岩 義明, Ōiwa Yoshiaki; born 19 July 1976) is a Japanese equestrian.

"Yoshi", as he is known, began riding as a junior high school student and took up eventing at University. In 2001 Yoshi he moved to the UK in order to pursue eventing trained by Andrew Hoy and in 2009 he moved to Germany. He now trains with German rider Dirk Schrade.

He earned Best Equestrian Athlete; award at the Japanese sports awards in 2005, ’07 and ’11.

Yoshi comes from a family of Olympians; his aunt was an international figure skater and is now an Olympic judge and his uncle won a silver medal in swimming at the Rome Olympic Games.

== Competition ==
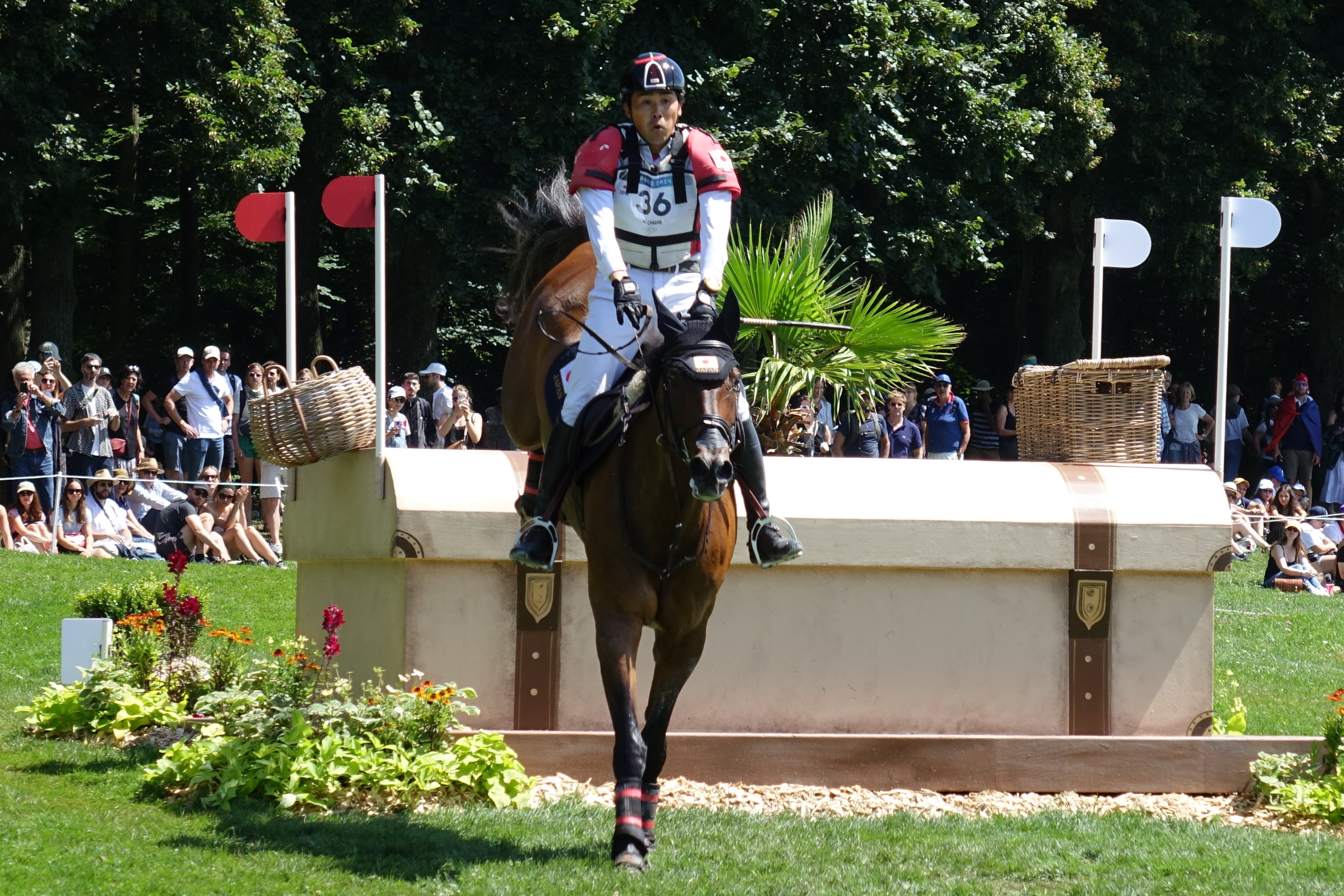
Oiwa and MGH Grafton Street at 2024 Summer Olympics

At the 2008 Summer Olympics, he finished in 49th in the individual eventing. There was no Japanese team.

At the 2012 Summer Olympics, he competed in the individual eventing and team eventing. After finishing top in the dressage phase of the individual competition, he was eliminated after the cross-country section.

At the 2017 Badminton Horse Trials, he finished in 8th place with The Duke Of Cavan.

In June 2017, he became the first Japanese rider to win a CCI*** competition outside Japan when he won the Bramham Horse Trials, in Yorkshire, England.
