= List of Philippine records in track cycling =

The following are the national records in track cycling in the Philippines, maintained by its national cycling federation, Integrated Cycling Federation of the Philippines. Classification on national records have not yet been officially established in any media by Philcycling (no sources found). Classifications on what is an official record attempt (based on UCI ruling):

- Must be done in an official UCI or local federation sanctioned event.
- Records may be set during a competition or during a special attempt (Hour record only as of 2026) that shall also be ridden in accordance with the relevant UCI or local federation regulations.

== Elite Men ==
Event	Record	Athlete	Date	Meet	Place	Ref
Flying 200 m time trial	10.865	Zedric Ivan Honorica	29 March 2026	Asian Championships	Tagaytay City, Philippines	
250 m time trial (standing start)	19.404	Matt Andrei Gonzalo	25 March 2026	Asian Championships	Tagaytay City, Philippines	
Flying 500 m time trial						
500 m time trial	35.199	Jan Paul Morales	9 October 2015	ACC Track Asia Cup	Bangkok, Thailand	
Flying 1 km time trial						
1 km time trial	1:08.442	Jan Paul Morales	9 December 2006	Asian Games	Doha, Qatar	
Team sprint (750 m)	49.773	Matt Andrei Gonzalo; Archie Cardaña; Marcus Gabriel Ricalde	25 March 2026	Asian Championships	Tagaytay City, Philippines	
Team sprint (1 km)	1:09.200	Alfie Catalan; Jan Paul Morales; Armel De Jesus	9 October 2015	ACC Track Asia Cup	Bangkok, Thailand	
4000 m individual pursuit	4:46.110	Prince Asas	30 March 2026	Asian Championships	Tagaytay City, Philippines	
4000 m team pursuit	4:31.177	Alfie Catalan; Paterno Jr. Curtan; Carlo Jazul; Arnold Marcelo	11 December 2006	Asian Games	Doha, Qatar	
Hour record	40.5 km	Arland Macasieb	15 September 2013	Special Time Trial Event	Carson, United States	

== Elite Women ==
Event	Record	Athlete	Date	Meet	Place	Ref
Flying 200 m time trial	12.624	Apryl Eppinger	15 November 2010	Asian Games	Guangzhou, China	
Flying 500 m time trial						
500 m time trial	37.324	Apryl Eppinger	15 November 2010	Asian Games	Guangzhou, China	
1 km time trial	1:17.851	Angeline Elvira	31 March 2026	Asian Championships	Tagaytay City, Philippines	
Team sprint						
3000 m individual pursuit	4:07.199	Baby Marites Bitbit	10 December 2006	Asian Games	Doha, Qatar	
4000 m individual pursuit	5:39.700	Maura Delos Reyes	28 August 2026	Track Asia Cup	Bangkok, Thailand	
4000 m team pursuit						
Hour record						

== Junior Men ==
Event	Record	Athlete	Date	Meet	Place	Ref
Flying 200 m time trial	11.898	Kaizel Jizmundo	26 March 2026	Asian Championships	Tagaytay City, Philippines	
Flying 500 m time trial						
500 m time trial						
1 km time trial	1:08.951	Asher Job Albo	30 March 2026	Asian Championships	Tagaytay City, Philippines	
Team sprint	52.894	Prince Andrei Pedragosa; Asher Job Albo; Kaizel Jizmundo	25 March 2026	Asian Championships	Tagaytay City, Philippines	
3000 m individual pursuit						
4000 m team pursuit						
Hour record						

== Junior Women ==
Event	Record	Athlete	Date	Meet	Place	Age	Ref
Flying 200 m time trial	13.485	Jeanne Soleil Cervantes	26 March 2026	Asian Championships	Tagaytay City, Philippines	17 years, 99 days	
Flying 500 m time trial							
500 m time trial	48.73	Avegail Benosa	28 May 2013	POC-PSC Philippine National Games Championship	Quezon City, Philippines	17 years, 176 days	
1 km time trial	1:23.177	Jeanne Soleil Cervantes	30 March 2026	Asian Championships	Tagaytay City, Philippines	17 years, 103 days	
Team sprint							
3000 m individual pursuit	5:10.30	Avegail Benosa	28 May 2013	POC-PSC Philippine National Games Championship	Quezon City, Philippines	17 years, 176 days	
4000 m team pursuit							
Hour record							
