= Field hockey at the 2007 SEA Games =

Field hockey at the 2007 SEA Games was held at the Hockey Stadium at the Queen Sirikit Sport Centre, Pathum Thani Province, Thailand.

== Medal table ==
* Host nation (Thailand)

Rank	Nation	Gold	Silver	Bronze	Total
1	Malaysia	2	0	0	2
2	Thailand*	0	1	1	2
3	Singapore	0	1	0	1
Totals (3 entries)		2	2	1	5

== Medalists ==
Event	Gold	Silver	Bronze
Men	Malaysia (MAS); Ahmad Anuar Sham Kamar; Baljit Singh Sarjab; Hafifi Hafiz Hanafi; Keevan Raj Kali Kavandan; Khairulnizam Ibrahim; Kuhan Shanmuganathan; Logan Raj Kali Kavandan; Mohd Fairus Wanasir; Mohamad Herwan Pami; Mohd Riduan Nasir; Mohd Sallehin Abdul Ghani; Mohd Sufian Mohamad; Muhammad Amerrullah Abdul Aziz; Muhammad Razie Abdul Rahim; Nabil Fiqri Mohammad Noor; Sasitheran Gopalan	Singapore (SIN); Chia Kai Bin; Enrico Elifh Marican; Harjeet Singh Sio Tarsem; Hazmi Ibrahim; Herman Mansor; Kelvin Lim Yong Sheng; Leon Roger Lim Shi Hao; Mohd Farhan Kamsani; Mohd Ishak Ismail; Mohd Nurizzat Taib; Mohd Sabri Yuhari; Ng Wan Chiang; Ong Kang Wee; Saifulnizam Seftu; Samuel Nee Yong Liang; Shaun Lim Shi Hee	Thailand (THA); Kamonchai Rattanadechakul; Nirut Sukruai; Noppadon Prompimp; Payung Inkaew; Phorntep Potarod; Pornthawee Yingkumpan; Rachan Suwanmanee; Sadakorn Vimuttanon; Seksit Somoechai; Sompop Boonsong; Surasak Thammuangkun; Suthiri Thiposod; Sutus Ongart; Teerapong Limbanyen; Thewarat Maiprasout; Yutana Sutanapat
Women	Malaysia (MAS); Catherine Lambor; Chitra Dwi Arumugam; Ernawati Mahmood; Farah Ayuni Yahya; Fazilla Sylvester Silin; Intan Nurairah Khusaini; Juliani Mohamad Din; Kannagi Arumugam; Nadia Abdul Rahman; Noor Hasliza Ali; Norbaini Hashim; Norfaraha Hashim; Nuraini Abdul Rashid; Nurul Nadia Mokhtar; Sebah Kari; Siti Sarah Nurfarah Ismail	Thailand (THA); Boonta Duangurai; Chantree Yuengyun; Chittra Deemol; Chutarat Sriyoorod; Dokkoon Seedee; Duangrut Chantaruck; Jesdaporn Tongsun; Jirawari Hoytong; Kamolrat Thongkanarak; Kannika Lewrungrot; Kittiya Chotmanee; Phannipa Phanin; Ratsamee Jaturonratsamee; Somkhoun Sensod; Sukanya Ritngam; Supannee Yimnual	not awarded
