= Gymnastics at the 2007 SEA Games =

Gymnastics at the 2007 Southeast Asian Games
- Venue: His Majesty the King's Birthday 80th Anniversary Stadium
- Location: Nakhon Ratchasima Province, Thailand

Gymnastics at the 2007 SEA Games was divided into three sub-categories: artistic gymnastics, rhythmic gymnastics, and aerobics. All events were held at the Gymnasium 1 at the His Majesty the King's Birthday 80th Anniversary Stadium (5 December 2007), Nakhon Ratchasima Province, Thailand.

== Medal winners ==
=== Artistic ===
==== Men ====
Event	Gold	Silver	Bronze
Team all-around	Thailand; Suriyen Chanduang; Rartchawat Kaewpanya; Thitipong Sukdee; Saran Suwansa; Sattra Suwansa; Kittipong Yudee	Vietnam; Hầu Trung Linh; Hoàng Cường; Nguyễn Hà Thanh; Nguyễn Minh Tuấn; Phạm Phước Hưng; Trương Minh Sang	Malaysia; Mohd Azlan Shah Ismail; Mohd Azzam Azmi; Mohd Shahril Johari; Lum Wan Foong; Onn Kwang Tung; Ooi Wei Siang
Individual all-around	Rartchawat Kaewpanya; Thailand	Ooi Wei Siang; Malaysia	Trương Minh Sang; Vietnam
Floor	Rartchawat Kaewpanya; Thailand	Hoàng Cường; Vietnam	Saran Suwansa; Thailand
Horizontal bar	Ooi Wei Siang; Malaysia	not awarded	Rartchawat Kaewpanya; Thailand
Horizontal bar	Phạm Phước Hưng; Vietnam	not awarded	Rartchawat Kaewpanya; Thailand
Parallel bars	Nguyễn Hà Thanh; Vietnam	Phạm Phước Hưng; Vietnam	Rartchawat Kaewpanya; Thailand
Pommel horse	Thitipong Sukdee; Thailand	Rartchawat Kaewpanya; Thailand	David Jonathan Chan; Singapore
Rings	Nguyễn Minh Tuấn; Vietnam	Thitipong Sukdee; Thailand	Ooi Wei Siang; Malaysia
Vault	Mohammad Aldilla Akbar; Indonesia	Rartchawat Kaewpanya; Thailand	Ooi Wei Siang; Malaysia

==== Women ====
Event	Gold	Silver	Bronze
Team all-around	Singapore; Lim Heem Wei; Nur Atikah Nabilah; Sarah Ng Hui Min; Nazyra Suhairi; Tabitha Tay Jia Hui; Nicole Tay Xi Hui	Vietnam; Đặng Thị Thu Thủy; Đỗ Thị Ngân Thương; Đỗ Thị Thu Huyền; Dương Minh Hằng; Nguyễn Thùy Dương; Phan Thị Hà Thanh	Malaysia; Nurul Fatiha Abdul Hamid; Nabihah Ali; Tracie Ang; Sau Wah Chan; Noor Hasleen Fatihin Hasnan; Loh Hui Xin
Individual all-around	Tabitha Tay Jia Hui; Singapore	not awarded	Đỗ Thị Ngân Thương; Vietnam
Individual all-around	Nicole Tay Xi Hui; Singapore	not awarded	Đỗ Thị Ngân Thương; Vietnam
Balance beam	Đỗ Thị Ngân Thương; Vietnam	Sau Wah Chan; Malaysia	Dewi Prahara; Indonesia
Floor	Tabitha Tay Jia Hui; Singapore	Nicole Tay Xi Hui; Singapore	Đỗ Thị Ngân Thương; Vietnam
Uneven bars	Sau Wah Chan; Malaysia	Nicole Tay Xi Hui; Singapore	Nguyễn Thùy Dương; Vietnam
Vault	Phan Thị Hà Thanh; Vietnam	Natthakarn Khanchai; Thailand	not awarded
Vault	Phan Thị Hà Thanh; Vietnam	Kanokpron Martin; Thailand	not awarded
Vault	Phan Thị Hà Thanh; Vietnam	Tabitha Tay Jia Hui; Singapore	not awarded

=== Rhythmic ===
==== Women ====
Event	Gold	Silver	Bronze
Team all-around	Malaysia; Foong Seow Ting; Jaime Lee Yoke Jeng; Wen Chean Lim; Wan Siti Haniza Wan Izahar	Thailand; Natnaree Chimplee; Waraporn Potnsirijanya; Tharatip Sridee; Chariya Srisamart	Vietnam; Lê Viết Hà; Lưu Hoài Thu; Nguyễn Thị Trang; Trần Thị Minh Thu
Individual all-around	Tharatip Sridee; Thailand	Wen Chean Lim; Malaysia	Foong Seow Ting; Malaysia
Clubs	Wen Chean Lim; Malaysia	Tharatip Sridee; Thailand	Foong Seow Ting; Malaysia
Hoop	Tharatip Sridee; Thailand	Wen Chean Lim; Malaysia	Jaime Lee Yoke Jeng; Malaysia
Ribbon	Wen Chean Lim; Malaysia	Tharatip Sridee; Thailand	Foong Seow Ting; Malaysia
Rope	Wen Chean Lim; Malaysia	Tharatip Sridee; Thailand	Foong Seow Ting; Malaysia

=== Aerobic ===
Event	Gold	Silver	Bronze
Men's individual	Kittipong Tawinun; Thailand	Phairach Thotkhamchai; Thailand	Nguyễn Thiện Phương; Vietnam
Women's individual	Roypim Ngampeerapong; Thailand	Nguyễn Phương Thành; Vietnam	Suwadee Phrutichai; Thailand
Mixed pairs	Thailand; Nattawut Pimpa; Roypim Ngampeerapong	not awarded	Indonesia; Lody Lontoh; Tyana Dewi Koesumawati
Mixed pairs	Vietnam; Trần Thị Thu Hà; Vũ Bá Đông	not awarded	Indonesia; Lody Lontoh; Tyana Dewi Koesumawati
Men's trios	Thailand; Kittipong Tawinun; Phairach Thotkhamchai; Chanchalak Yiammit	Vietnam; Nguyễn Xuân Giang; Nguyễn Thiện Phương; Vũ Bá Đông	Indonesia; Lody Lontoh; Faizal Amirullah; Ardi Dedek Saputra
