= Sailing at the 2007 SEA Games =

Sailing at the 2007 SEA Games took place at the Ocean Marina Yacht Club and Jomtien Beach in Thailand. Seventeen gold medals were contested from 8 December 2007 to 14 December 2007.

== Medal table ==
* Host nation (Thailand)

Rank	Nation	Gold	Silver	Bronze	Total
1	Thailand*	10	2	2	14
2	Singapore	4	6	3	13
3	Malaysia	2	2	4	8
4	Indonesia	1	2	1	4
5	Philippines	0	5	1	6
6	Myanmar	0	0	2	2
Totals (6 entries)		17	17	13	47

== Medalists ==
Event	Gold	Silver	Bronze
Boys' Optimist	Navee Thamsoontorn; Thailand	Mohd Nazrin Muiz Asri; Malaysia	Russell Kan Tsung Liang; Singapore
Girls' Optimist	Rachel Lee Qing; Singapore	Noppakao Poonpat; Thailand	Alissa Chew; Malaysia
Optimist team	Thailand (THA); Patteera Mae-u-samsen; Natthawut Paenyaem; Noppakao Poonpat; Navee Thamsoontorn; Jittima Thanawitwilat	Singapore (SIN); Daniella Hui Min; Russell Kan Tsung Liang; Rachel Lee Qing; Luke Tan Yi Hao; Darren Wong Loong	Malaysia (MAS); Alissa Chew; Koh Boon Quan; Khairunnisa Afendy; Khairulnizam Afendy; Mohd Nazrin Muiz Asri
Laser Standard	Mohd Rormzi Muhamad; Malaysia	Koh Seng Leong; Singapore	Manat Phothong; Thailand
Laser Radial	Nurul Elia Anuar; Malaysia	Siobhan Tam Shiu Wun; Singapore	Sai Chimsawat; Thailand
Super MOD	Sutee Poonpat; Thailand	Lo Jun Hao; Singapore	Harith Amry Nasution Hairuddin; Malaysia
Men's 420	Singapore (SIN); Sherman Cheng Feng Yuan; Justin Liu Yinman	Philippines (PHI); Emerson Villena; Lester Troy Tayong	Malaysia (MAS); Ku Anas Ku Zamil; Amir Muizz Djamaludin
Women's 420	Thailand (THA); Duanghathai Booncherd; Angkana Poonsirikot	Singapore (SIN); Jovina Choo Bei Fen; Sara Tan Li Ching	Myanmar (MYA); Su Sandar Wai; Knin Nyo Lin
Men's 470	Singapore (SIN); Roy Tay Jun Hao; Chung Pei Ming	Philippines (PHI); Ridgely Balladares; Rommel Chavez	Myanmar (MYA); Aung Mying Thia; Sai Pyae Song Hein
Women's 470	Singapore (SIN); Dawn Liu Xiaodan; Elizabeth Tan Li Yong	Malaysia (MAS); Nurul Ain Md Isa; Noor Balqis Yaacop	not awarded
Hobie 16	Thailand (THA); Damrongsak Vongtim; Sakda Vongtim	Singapore (SIN); Low Wen Chun; Jonathan Russel Chew Wei Xiang	Indonesia (INA); Ario Dipo Subagio; Kris Soebiyantoro
Farr Platu 25	Thailand (THA); Wiwat Poonpat; Saichon Boontham; Anun Daochanterk; Veerasit Puangnak; Nattapol Srihirun	Philippines (PHI); Rafale Buitre; Teodorico Asejo; Mark Gil Francisco; Richly Magsanay; Joel Mejarito	Singapore (SIN); Justin Tan Weizheng; Wilbur Chan Jun Kun; Alvin Chong Jin Yuan; Alvin Hong Kwong Kin; Justin Wong Ming Ho

=== Windsurfing ===
Event	Gold	Silver	Bronze
Formula Windsurfing	Ek Boonsawad; Thailand	Renerick Moreno; Philippines	not awarded
Men's RS: X	Natthaphong Phonoppharat; Thailand	German Paz; Philippines	not awarded
Mistral Youth	Navin Singsart; Thailand	Mustofa; Indonesia	Joshua Choo Meng Keng; Singapore
Mistral Light	Arun Homraruen; Thailand	I Gede Subagiasa; Indonesia	Geylord Coveta; Philippines
Mistral Heavy	I Gusti Made Oka Sulaksana; Indonesia	Phanuthat Ruamsap; Thailand	not awarded

== Events ==
=== Farr Platu 25 ===
Rank	Skipper	Crew	Race												Total	Nett
Rank	Skipper	Crew	1	2	3	4	5	6	7	8	9	10	11	12	Total	Nett
1	(Thailand) WIWAT Poonpat	VEERASIT Puangnak; ANUN Daochanterk; SAICHON Boontham; NATTAPOL Srihirun	~~4~~	4	1	1	1	1	1	1	1	1	1	~~5~~ DNC	22	13
2	(Philippines) BUITRE Rafale	Teodorico Asejo; MAGSANAY Richly; MEJARITO Joel; FRANCISCO Mark Gil	2	1	4	~~5~~ DSQ	3	3	3	2	2	2	2	~~5~~ DNC	34	24
3	(Singapore) Tan Weizheng Justin	WONG Ming Ho Justin; CHONG Jin Yuan Alvin; CHAN Jun Kun Wilbur; KWONG Kin Alvin	1	3	2	2	4	4	2	~~5~~ DSQ	3	3	3	~~5~~ DNC	37	27
4	(Malaysia) RIZAL Mahadi Zazili	SHARIFF Mohd Rashider; MUSTAFA Fauzi; JAB Ishak; ALI Muhd Shaifulla	3	2	3	3	2	2	~~4~~	3	4	4	4	~~5~~ DNC	39	30

=== Formula Windsurfing Men's ===
Rank	Skipper	Race										Total	Nett
Rank	Skipper	1	2	3	4	5	6	7	8	9	10	Total	Nett
1	(Thailand) Ek Boonsawad	~~1~~	~~1~~	1	1	1	1	1	1	1	1	10	8
2	(Philippines) MORENO Renerick	2	2	2	2	2	2	~~3~~	2	~~3~~	2	22	16
3	(Malaysia) Yap Long soon	~~3~~	3	~~4~~ DNS	3	3	3	2	3	2	3	29	22

=== Hobie 16 Men's ===
Rank	Skipper	Crew	Race												Total	Nett
Rank	Skipper	Crew	1	2	3	4	5	6	7	8	9	10	11	12	Total	Nett
1	(Thailand) DAMRONGSAK Vongtim	SAKDA Vongtim	1	1	1	1	1	1	1	1	1	1	~~5~~ DNC	~~5~~ DNC	20	10
2	(Singapore) Low Wen chun	CHEW WXJR	2	3	2	2	2	2	3	2	2	2	~~5~~ DNC	~~5~~ DNC	32	22
3	(Indonesia) ARIO Dipo Subagio	KRIS Soebiyantoro	3	2	3	3	3	3	2	3	3	4	~~5~~ DNC	~~5~~ DNC	39	29
4	(Philippines) TAYONG Leahnnie	DELOS SANTOS Melvin	4	4	4	4	4	4	4	4	4	3	~~5~~ DNC	~~5~~ DNC	49	39

=== International 420 Men's ===
Rank	Skipper	Crew	Race												Total	Nett
Rank	Skipper	Crew	1	2	3	4	5	6	7	8	9	10	11	12	Total	Nett
1	(Singapore) Liu Yinman Justin	CHENG Feng yuan Sherman	1	1	~~2~~	2	~~3~~	2	1	2	2	2	2	2	20	15
2	(Philippines) VILLENA Emerson	TAYONG Lester troy	4	2	1	~~5~~	1	~~5~~	4	1	1	1	3	2	28	18
3	(Malaysia) KU ZAMIL Ku Anas	DJAMALUDIN Amir muizz	1	1	1	1	~~1~~	1	1	1	1	~~1~~	1	1	31	23
4	(Thailand) THANAKAN Korkerd	SETHAWUT Thatmala	~~5~~	4	4	1	2	4	2	4	5	~~5~~	5	3	39	29
5	(Myanmar) NAY La Kyaw	Min Min	3	~~5~~	~~5~~	4	5	3	5	5	3	3	4	5	47	37

=== International 420 Women's ===
Rank	Skipper	Crew	Race											Total	Nett
Rank	Skipper	Crew	1	2	3	4	5	6	7	8	9	10	11	Total	Nett
1	(Thailand) DUANGHATHAI Booncherd	ANGKANA Poonsirikot	~~3~~	1	1	1	2	3	~~4~~	3	1	1	3	23	16
2	(Singapore) Choo Bei Fen Jovina	Tan Li Ching Sara	1	3	3	2	1	~~4~~	1	1	3	~~4~~	2	25	17
3	(Myanmar) SU Sandar Wai	KNIN Nyo Lin	2	2	~~4~~	3	3	2	3	2	2	2	1	26	19
4	(Malaysia) Tan Rufina	Lim Mabel	~~4~~	4	2	4	4	1	2	4	4	3	4	36	28

=== International 470 Men's ===
Rank	Skipper	Crew	Race												Total	Nett
Rank	Skipper	Crew	1	2	3	4	5	6	7	8	9	10	11	12	Total	Nett
1	(Singapore) Tay Jun Hao Roy	Chung Pei Ming	1	3	~~4~~	3	1	2	1	3	1				19	15
2	(Philippines) BALLADARES Ridgely	CHAVEZ Rommel	3	1	2	2	3	1	2	~~4~~	3				21	17
3	(Myanmar) AUNG Mying Thia	SAI PYAE Song Hein	2	~~5~~	1	1	4	3	4	1	4				25	20
4	(Thailand) KITIPONG Khambang	VORAVIT Vorsaen	4	2	3	~~6~~ OCS	2	4	5	2	2				30	24
5	(Malaysia) DERMAVAN Bin Hazuan hazim	PRADIT A/L Boon tong	~~5~~	1	1	1	1	1	1	1	1	1	1	1	41	36

=== International 470 Women's ===
Rank	Skipper	Crew	Race											Total	Nett
Rank	Skipper	Crew	1	2	3	4	5	6	7	8	9	10	11	Total	Nett
1	(Singapore) Liu Xiaodan Dawn	Tan Li Yong Elizabeth	~~2~~	2	1	2	1	1	2	1	1	2	1	16	12
2	(Malaysia) MD ISA Nurul Ain	YAACOP Noor Balqis	~~3~~	3	2	3	2	2	1	2	3	1	2	24	18
3	(Thailand) WANDEE Vongtim	YUPA Suwannawat	1	1	~~3~~	1	3	3	3	3	2	3	3	26	20

=== Laser Men's ===
Rank	Skipper	Race												Total	Nett
Rank	Skipper	1	2	3	4	5	6	7	8	9	10	11	12	Total	Nett
1	(Malaysia) MUHAMAD Mohd Rormzi	~~2~~	2	1	1	1	2	1	1	2	1	1	~~3~~	18	13
2	(Singapore) Koh Seng Leong	1	1	2	~~3~~	2	1	2	2	1	2	2	~~4~~	23	16
3	(Thailand) MANAT Phothong	3	3	3	~~4~~	3	3	~~4~~	3	3	4	3	2	38	30
4	(Indonesia) SUJATMIKO Sujatmiko	~~4~~	~~4~~	4	2	4	4	3	4	4	3	4	1	41	33

=== Laser Radial Open ===
Rank	Skipper	Race												Total	Nett
Rank	Skipper	1	2	3	4	5	6	7	8	9	10	11	12	Total	Nett
1	(Malaysia) ANUAR Nurul Elia	~~2~~	~~2~~	1	2	1	1	1	1	2	2	2	1	18	14
2	(Singapore) Tam Shiu wun siobhan	1	1	~~2~~	1	~~2~~	2	2	2	1	1	1	2	18	14
3	(Thailand) SAI Chimsawat	~~4~~ DSQ	~~3~~	3	3	3	3	3	3	3	3	3	3	37	30

=== Mistral One Design (Youth) ===
Rank	Skipper	Race										Total	Nett
Rank	Skipper	1	2	3	4	5	6	7	8	9	10	Total	Nett
1	(Thailand) SINGSART Navin	~~1~~	1	1	1	1	1	1	1	~~2~~	1	11	8
2	(Indonesia) MUSTOFA	2	~~3~~	2	2	2	2	~~5~~ RAF	2	1	2	22	16
3	(Singapore) Choo Meng Keong Joshua	~~3~~	2	~~3~~	3	3	3	2	3	3	3	28	22
4	(Malaysia) LOW Ian	~~5~~ DNF	~~4~~	4	4	4	4	3	4	4	4	40	31

=== Mistral One Design Heavy Weight ===
Rank	Skipper	Race										Total	Nett
Rank	Skipper	1	2	3	4	5	6	7	8	9	10	Total	Nett
1	(Indonesia) SULAKSANA I Gusti Made Oka	~~1~~	1	1	1	1	~~2~~	1	1	1	1	11	8
2	(Thailand) RUAMSAP Phanuthat	~~4~~ OCS	2	2	2	2	1	~~4~~	2	2	2	23	15
3	(Philippines) COVETA Bobby	2	~~3~~	~~3~~	3	3	3	2	3	3	3	28	22

=== Mistral One Design Light Weight ===
Rank	Skipper	Race										Total	Nett
Rank	Skipper	1	2	3	4	5	6	7	8	9	10	Total	Nett
1	(Thailand) HOMRARURN Arun	~~1~~	~~1~~	1	1	1	1	1	1	1	1	10	8
2	(Indonesia) SUBAGIASA I Gede	~~2~~	~~3~~	2	2	2	2	2	2	2	2	21	16
3	(Philippines) COVETA Geylord	~~3~~	2	~~3~~	3	3	3	3	3	3	3	29	23
4	(Singapore) Leonard Ong	~~4~~	~~4~~	4	4	4	4	4	4	4	4	40	32

=== Olympic Class Neil Pryde RX:S Men's ===
Rank	Skipper	Race										Total	Nett
Rank	Skipper	1	2	3	4	5	6	7	8	9	10	Total	Nett
1	(Thailand) Natthaphong Phonoppharat	~~2~~	~~1~~	1	1	1	1	1	1	1	1	11	8
2	(Philippines) PAZ German	1	2	~~3~~	~~3~~	2	2	2	2	2	3	22	16
3	(Indonesia) SAHID Badrul	~~3~~	~~3~~	2	2	3	3	3	3	3	2	27	21

=== Optimist Boy's ===
Rank	Skipper	Race											Total	Nett
Rank	Skipper	1	2	3	4	5	6	7	8	9	10	11	Total	Nett
1	(Thailand) NAVEE Thamsoontorn	2	~~3~~	1	1	2	1	1	3	~~4~~	1	2	21	14
2	(Malaysia) MOHD ASRI Mohd Nazrin Muiz	~~4~~	1	2	~~3~~	3	3	3	1	1	2	1	24	17
3	(Singapore) Kan Tsung Liang Russell	1	2	3	2	1	2	2	2	2	~~4~~	~~4~~	25	17
4	(Myanmar) KAUNG KAUNG @ Johnny	3	4	4	4	4	4	4	4	~~5~~	~~5~~	3	44	34
5	(Philippines) VILLENA Erickson	5	~~6~~ DNF	5	5	5	5	~~6~~ OCS	5	3	3	5	53	41

=== Optimist Girl's ===
Rank	Skipper	Race											Total	Nett
Rank	Skipper	1	2	3	4	5	6	7	8	9	10	11	Total	Nett
1	(Singapore) Lee Qing Rachel	1	2	2	1	1	~~6~~ OCS	1	4	1	~~5~~	2	26	15
2	(Thailand) NOPPAKAO Poonpat	2	1	1	3	3	1	2	2	2	~~4~~	~~4~~	25	17
3	(Malaysia) Chew Alissa	~~3~~	3	3	2	2	2	3	1	~~4~~	1	1	25	18
4	(Myanmar) THIRI Ye Win	4	~~6~~ DNF	4	4	4	3	4	3	3	2	~~5~~	42	31
5	(Philippines) AMADEO Rosario	~~5~~	4	~~5~~	5	5	4	5	5	5	3	3	49	39

=== Optimist Team Racing ===
Rank	Skipper	Total	Nett
1	(Thailand) PATTEERA Mae-u-samsen; JITTIWA Thanawitwilat; NATTHAWUT Paenyaem; NOPPAKAO Poonpat; NAVEE Thamsoontorn	1	1
2	(Singapore) Kan Tsung Liang Russell; LEE Qing Rachel; TAN Yi hao Luke; HUI Min Daniella; WONG Loong Darren	2	2
3	(Malaysia) MOHD ASRI Mohd Nazrin Muiz; CHEW Alissa; MAHD Afendy Kharunnisa; KOH Boon Quan; MOHD Afendy Khairul Nizam	3	3
4	(Myanmar) PHONE Aung Kha; MIN Khant Phone Thwin; THIRI Ye Win; WAI Pwint Wabo; KAUNG Kaung @ Johnny	4	4

=== Super Mod Men's ===
Rank	Skipper	Race											Total	Nett
Rank	Skipper	1	2	3	4	5	6	7	8	9	10	11	Total	Nett
1	(Thailand) SUTEE Poonpat	~~3~~	~~4~~	1	1	1	2	2	2	2	1	1	20	13
2	(Singapore) LO Jun hao	1	1	2	~~4~~	2	1	1	1	3	3	~~4~~	23	15
3	(Malaysia) HAIRUDDIN HAN	2	~~5~~	~~4~~	2	3	3	4	3	4	2	2	34	25
4	(Philippines) MATA Patrick	5	2	5	3	~~6~~	5	3	~~6~~	1	5	3	44	32
5	(Myanmar) TIN Htoo Zaw	~~6~~	3	3	5	4	4	5	4	~~6~~	6	5	51	39
6	(Indonesia) BOBBY Feri Andriyanto	4	~~6~~	~~6~~	6	5	6	6	5	5	4	6	59	47

Preceded by 2005	Sailing at the SEA Games; 2007 SEA Games	Succeeded by 2009
