= Cycling at the 2007 SEA Games =

Cycling at the 2007 SEA Games was split into three categories:

- Track, held at the Velodrome at His Majesty the King's 80th Birthday Anniversary Stadium (5 December 2007) in Amphoe Mueang Nakhon Ratchasima, Nakhon Ratchasima Province, Thailand.
- Road, held on Mittraphap Road (Thailand Route 2), Nakhon Ratchasima Province, Thailand.
- Mountain, held at the Khao Yai Thiang, Amphoe Sikhio, Nakhon Ratchasima Province, Thailand.

The cycling schedule began on December 5 to December 13.

== Medal table ==
* Host nation (Thailand)

Rank	Nation	Gold	Silver	Bronze	Total
1	Thailand*	5	10	2	17
2	Indonesia	5	2	4	11
3	Malaysia	4	5	4	13
4	Philippines	4	1	5	10
5	Vietnam	1	1	4	6
Totals (5 entries)		19	19	19	57

== Medalists ==
=== Mountain biking ===
Event	Gold	Silver	Bronze
Men's downhill	Joey Barba; Philippines	Popo Ariyo Sejati; Indonesia	Sitichai Ketkaewmanee; Thailand
Women's downhill	Sattayanun Abdulkare; Thailand	Ausanee Pradupyard; Thailand	Phan Thị Thuỳ Trang; Vietnam
Men's cross country	Tawatchai Masae; Thailand	Eusebio Quinones; Philippines	Nino Surban; Philippines
Women's cross country	Nguyễn Thị Thanh Huyền; Vietnam	Nguyễn Thanh Đạm; Vietnam	Baby Marites Bitbit; Philippines

=== Road cycling ===
Event	Gold	Silver	Bronze
Men's time trial	Prajak Mahawong; Thailand	Tonton Susanto; Indonesia	Mai Công Hiếu; Vietnam
Women's time trial	Monrudee Chapookam; Thailand	Chanpeng Nontasin; Thailand	Baby Marites Bitbit; Philippines
Men's road race	Ryan Ariehaan Hillmant; Indonesia	Suhardi Hassan; Malaysia	Trịnh Phát Đạt; Vietnam
Women's road race	Baby Marites Bitbit; Philippines	Thatsani Wichana; Thailand	Võ Thị Phương Phi; Vietnam

=== Track cycling ===
==== Men ====
Event	Gold	Silver	Bronze
1 km time trial	Mohd Rizal Tisin; Malaysia	Azizulhasni Awang; Malaysia	Jan Paul Morales; Philippines
Sprint	Josiah Ng Onn Lam; Malaysia	Azizulhasni Awang; Malaysia	Asep Suryaman; Indonesia
Team sprint	Malaysia; Azizulhasni Awang; Mohd Edrus Yunus; Mohd Rizal Tisin	Thailand; Pongthep Thapimai; Sithichai Rittisil; Wiwatchai Chuaikhun	Indonesia; Asep Suryaman; Samai; Wawan Setyobudi
Pursuit	Alfie Catalan; Philippines	Amir Mustafa Rusli; Malaysia	Projo Waseso; Indonesia
Team pursuit	Malaysia; Amir Mustafa Rusli; Harrif Salleh; Mohammad Akmal Amrun; Mohd Jasmin Ruslan	Thailand; Pornthep Pinkaew; Suphut Theerawanitchanan; Thanawat Somna; Turakit Boonratanathanakorn	Philippines; Alfie Catalan; Arnold Marcelo; Paterno Curtan, Jr. Ronald Gorantes
Points race	Victor Espiritu; Philippines	Prajak Mahawong; Thailand	Thanawat Somna; Thailand

==== Women ====
Event	Gold	Silver	Bronze
500 m time trial	Uyun Muzizah; Indonesia	Jutatip Maneephan; Thailand	Fatehah Mustapa; Malaysia
Sprint	Uyun Muzizah; Indonesia	Jutatip Maneephan; Thailand	Fatehah Mustapa; Malaysia
Team sprint	Indonesia; Nurhayati; Santia Tri Kusuma; Uyun Muzizah	Thailand; Jutatip Maneephan; Sutharat Boonsawat; Wathinee Lukachorn	Malaysia; Fatehah Mustapa; Noor Azian Alias; Ruszatulzanariah Yusof
Pursuit	Chanpeng Nontasin; Thailand	Uracca Leow Hoay Sim; Malaysia	Nurhayati; Indonesia
Points race	Santia Tri Kusuma; Indonesia	Monrudee Chapookam; Thailand	Uracca Leow Hoay Sim; Malaysia

Preceded by 2005	Cycling at the SEA Games; 2007 SEA Games	Succeeded by 2009

== See also ==
- 2007 in track cycling
