= Archery at the 2007 SEA Games =

- Venue: Football Field 2, Suranaree University of Technology
- Dates: 7–12 December 2007

Archery at the 2007 SEA Games was held at Football Field 2, Suranaree University of Technology, Nakhon Ratchasima, Thailand. The archery schedule began on December 7 to December 12.

== Medal tally ==
* Host nation (Thailand)

Rank	Nation	Gold	Silver	Bronze	Total
1	Indonesia (INA)	3	5	1	9
2	Malaysia (MAS)	2	2	1	5
3	Philippines (PHI)	2	1	1	4
4	Vietnam (VIE)	1	0	0	1
5	Myanmar (MYA)	0	0	2	2
5	Thailand (THA)*	0	0	2	2
7	Singapore (SIN)	0	0	1	1
Totals (7 entries)		8	8	8	24

== Medalists ==
=== Recurve ===
Event	Gold	Silver	Bronze
Men's individual	Cheng Chu Sian; Malaysia	Wan Khalmizam; Malaysia	Rahmat Sulistyawan; Indonesia
Women's individual	Ika Yuliana Rochmawati; Indonesia	Rina Dewi Puspitasari; Indonesia	Chutinan Sakulchai; Thailand
Men's team	Malaysia (MAS); Cheng Chu Sian; Wan Khalmizam; Muhammad Marbawi	Indonesia (INA); Ahmad Awal; Rahmat Sulistyawan; Hendro Supprianto	Philippines (PHI); Marvin Cordero; Mark Javier; Ian Wayne Larsen
Women's team	Indonesia (INA); Ika Yuliana Rochmawati; Rina Dewi Puspitasari; Sugiharti Gina Rahayu	Malaysia (MAS); Irza Hanie Abu Samah; Anbarasi Subramaniam; Noor Aziera Taip	Thailand (THA); Patheera Boonnark; Chutinan Sakulchai; Sirilark Suksamorn

=== Compound ===
Event	Gold	Silver	Bronze
Men's individual	I Gusti Nyoman Puruhito; Indonesia	Earl Benjamin Yap; Philippines	Ye Min Swe; Myanmar
Women's individual	Amaya Paz; Philippines	Dellie Threesyadinda; Indonesia	Aung Ngeain; Myanmar
Men's team	Vietnam (VIE); Nguyễn Chí Ba; Nguyễn Thanh Tuấn; Nguyễn Tiến Cương	Indonesia (INA); Kuswantoro; I Gusti Nyoman Puruhito; Hendra Setijawan	Malaysia (MAS); Lau Siew Hong; Soo Teck Kim; Ting Leong Fong
Women's team	Philippines (PHI); Jennifer Chan; Amaya Paz; Abbigail Tindugan	Indonesia (INA); Lilies Handayani; Lilies Heliarti; Dellie Threesyadinda	Singapore (SIN); Maryanne Gul; Lee Bee Teng; Wong Lian Hoe

Preceded by 2005	Archery at the SEA Games; 2007 SEA Games	Succeeded by 2009
