= Equestrian at the 2007 SEA Games =

The events of the Equestrian at the 2007 Southeast Asian Games the dressage and show jumping events were held at the Horseshoe Point, Pattaya, Chon Buri Province, Thailand and the eventing event was held at the Thai Polo Club, Pattaya, Chon Buri Province, Thailand

== Medal tally ==
* Host nation (Thailand)

Rank	Nation	Gold	Silver	Bronze	Total
1	Malaysia	4	2	1	7
2	Thailand*	2	1	3	6
3	Indonesia	0	1	0	1
3	Philippines	0	1	0	1
Totals (4 entries)		6	5	4	15

== Medalists ==
Event	Gold	Silver	Bronze
Individual dressage	Qabil Ambak on Dexter (MAS)	Quzandria Nur on Lewes (MAS)	Chalermcharn Yotviriyapanit on Waldzauber (THA)
Team dressage	Malaysia; Lee Cheng Ni Diani on Antschar; Qabil Ambak on Dexter; Quzandria Nur on Lewes; Soraya Putri Alia on Odurin	Indonesia; Djolfi Momongan on Jamzes; Jeanne Lukito on Narco; Larasati Gading on Wyatt Earp; Lukas Ibrahim on Celine	Thailand; Atchakorn Phromyothi on Deauville II; Chalermcharn Yotviriyapanit on Waldzauber; Karittipoom Kreepkrang on Care For Me; Nuttada Inchat on Royal Flush
Individual show jumping	Qabil Ambak on Parvina (MAS)	Diego Lorenzo on Discovery (PHI)	Pongsiree Banluewong on Kara Joy (THA)
Team show jumping	Malaysia; Qabil Ambak on Parvina; Quzier Ambak on Calano; Syazna Leena Zulhasnan on Helu de Caudard; Syed Omar Almohdzar on Paris Prince	not awarded	not awarded
Individual eventing	Nina Ligon on Pacific Storm (THA)	Wisarut Tangplan on Deacha (THA)	Amir Zulkefle on Serious Fun (MAS)
Team eventing	Thailand; Nina Ligon on Pacific Storm; Tanin Pichaikarn on Kelecyn Emperor; Weerapat Pitakanonda on Joint Venture; Wisarut Tangplan on Deacha	Malaysia; Amir Zulkefle on Serious Fun; Edric Lee on Absolute Zero; Johari Lee on Star Portrait; Lingesparan Suppiah on Beefeater	not awarded
