= Alfie Catalan =

Personal information
- Born: Alfie Pajo Catalan; February 22, 1982 (age 44)
- Height: 180 cm (5 ft 11 in)

Cycling career
- Sport: Cycling
- Discipline: Individual pursuit
- Role: Rider
- Rider type: Track

Amateur teams
- Pagcor Cycling Filipino
- Philippine ARmy
Medal record
Representing Philippines
Men's cycling
SEA Games
Gold medal – first place	2011 Jakarta–Palembang	Individual pursuit
Gold medal – first place	2007 Nakhon Ratchasima	Individual pursuit
Gold medal – first place	2005 Manila	Individual pursuit
Bronze medal – third place	2011 Jakarta–Palembang	Team pursuit
Bronze medal – third place	2003 Ho Chi Minh City	Criterium

Alfie Pajo Catalan (born February 22, 1982) is a Filipino cyclist.

== Career ==
Alfie Catalan is a track cyclist who specializes in the individual pursuit. He has been part of the Philippine Army Cycling Team.

Catalan is a three-time SEA Games gold medalist for the Philippines. He won in the 2005 edition in Manila, the 2007 edition in Nakhon Ratchasima, and the 2011 edition in Jakarta and Palembang. He also won a bronze medal in the team pursuit in the 2011 edition. He also earlier won a bronze in the criterium in the 2003 edition in Ho Chi Minh City.

Catalan also raced at the 2006 Asian Games in Doha where he set a national record in the individual pursuit with the time of 4:48.275.

== Personal life ==
Catalan is a personnel of the Philippine Army with the rank of staff sergeant as of 2020.
