= Nina Ligon =

Thai equestrian

Nina Rujiraporn Lamsam Ligon
Personal information
- Born: 8 October 1991 (age 34) Bangkok, Thailand
Medal record
Eventer
Asian Games
| Silver medal – second place | 2010 Guangzhou | Team |
Southeast Asian Games
| Gold medal – first place | 2007 Nakhon Ratchasima | Team |
| Gold medal – first place | 2007 Nakhon Ratchasima | Individual |

Nina Ligon, Thai name Rujiraporn Lamsam Ligon (Thai: รุจิราภรณ์ ล่ำซำ ลีเกิ้น (ณีนา); born 8 October 1991) is a Thai-American equestrian, who competed for Thailand in the Individual eventing at the 2012 Summer Olympics. She was the first female equestrian to represent an Asian country in the equestrian events at the Olympic Games.

A dual US and Thai national, she is the youngest daughter of American businessman Austin Ligon and Samornmitr Lamsam (a daughter of Thai banker Kasem Lamsam). After being part of the US junior eventing team, the Thailand Equestrian Association invited her to compete for Thailand. At the 2007 Southeast Asian Games, she won the individual eventing event, and was part of the Thai team that won the team gold medal. At the 2010 Asian Games, Ligon was part of the Thai team that won silver, finishing 4th individually. In 2011, she was awarded the FEI Rising Star Award, which is given to equestrians aged 14-21 who demonstrate talent and determination.

At the 2012 Olympic Games, she rode Butts Leon, who was previously ridden by Andres Dibowski at the 2008 Olympics. The pair finished 41st out of 75. Following the London Olympics, she began a degree at Stanford University.
