= Polo at the 2007 SEA Games =

Polo at the 2007 Southeast Asian Games was held in the VR Sport Club, Samut Prakan, Thailand.

== List of events ==
- Men's tournament

== Medal winners ==
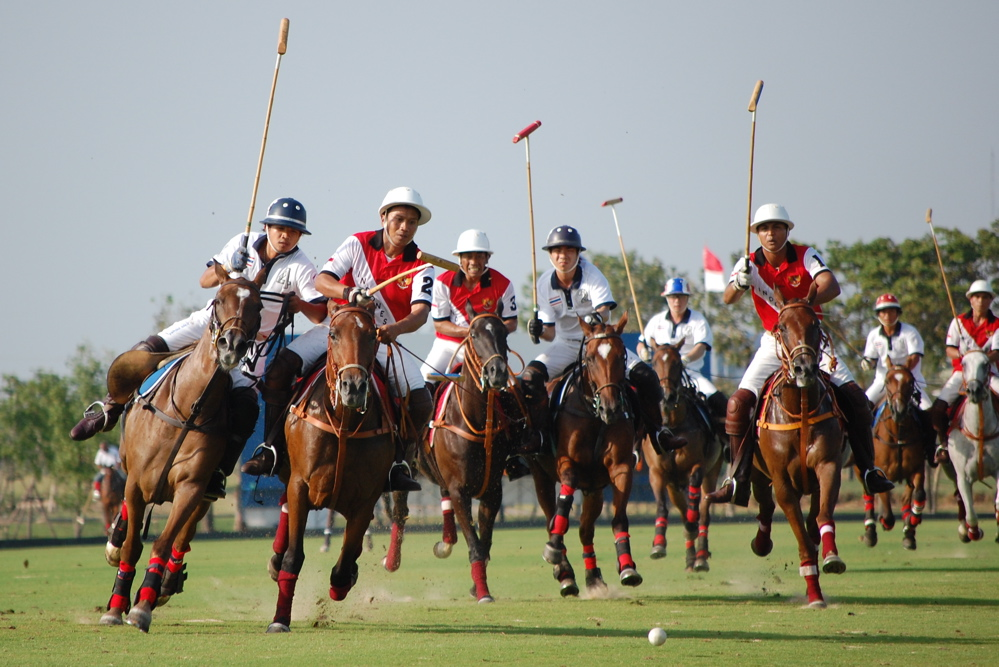
Indonesia plays against Thailand in SEA Games Polo 2007

Event	Gold	Silver	Bronze
Men's Team	Malaysia	Singapore	Thailand

== Participating Athletes ==
=== Thailand ===
- Raksriaksorn, Apichet
- Raksriaksorn, Aiyawatt
- Songvanich, Chanotai
- Tangcharoensathien, Thanasorn
- Chuawangkham, Thanasin
- Wongkraso, Satit

=== Philippines ===
- Jesus, Jay D. E.
- Bitong, Vicent
- Veloso, Antonio
- Elizalde, Santiago

=== Indonesia ===
- Krisnandar, Acep
- Ishak Supendi, Pepen
- Sarnen, Inen
- Momongan, Novel Alva
- Syafar, Muhammad Harrifar
- Wartono

=== Malaysia ===
- Mohamas Ismail, Shaik Reismann
- Tengku Sulaiman, Tengku Ahmed Shazril
- Kofle, Zulkhairi
- Mazlan, Saladin
- M. D. Zamri, M. D. Adyrizal
- Jabir Mohd Ali Moiz, Dato Mohamed Moiz
- Hairizal Yahya

=== Singapore ===
- Garcha, Satinder
- Jumabhoy, Asad
- Abisheganaden, Peter Jerome
- Faizulah-Khan, Misrab Musa
- Kin Hoong, Lawrence Khong
- Ang, Ban Tong
