= Zulhilmie Redzuan =

Malaysian lawn bowler

Personal information
- Nationality: Malaysian
- Born: 16 July 1986 (age 39) Kedah, Malaysia

Sport
- Sport: Bowls
Medal record
Representing Malaysia
Asia Pacific Bowls Championships
Bronze medal – third place	2015 Christchurch	triples
Bronze medal – third place	2019 Gold Coast	triples
Bronze medal – third place	2019 Gold Coast	fours
Southeast Asian Games
Gold medal – first place	2007 Nakhon Ratchasima	triples
Gold medal – first place	2019 Philippines	fours

Zulhilmie Ijoi Redzuan is an international Malaysian lawn bowler.

== Bowls career ==
=== World Championships ===
In 2020 he was selected for the 2020 World Outdoor Bowls Championship in Australia.

=== Commonwealth Games ===
Redzuan represented Malaysia in the triples and fours at the 2014 Commonwealth Games. Four years later he competed in the triples and fours at the 2018 Commonwealth Games; he reached the quarter finals of the latter.

=== Asia Pacific ===
Redzuan won a fours bronze medal in the 2015 Asia Pacific Bowls Championships and a double bronze (triples and fours) four years later at the 2019 Asia Pacific Bowls Championships in the Gold Coast, Queensland.

=== Southeast Asian Games ===
He also won two gold medals at the Lawn bowls at the 2007 Southeast Asian Games and Lawn bowls at the 2019 Southeast Asian Games.
