= Hasli Izwan =

Malaysian sport shooter

Personal information
- Full name: Hasli Izwan Amir Hasan
- Nationality: Malaysia
- Born: 22 February 1977 (age 49) Ipoh, Malaysia
- Height: 1.66 m (5 ft 5 1/2 in)
- Weight: 85 kg (187 lb)

Sport
- Sport: Shooting
- Event: 25 m rapid fire pistol (RFP)
- Club: National Shooting Association of Malaysia
- Coached by: Oleksandr Filipyuk
Medal record
Men's shooting
Representing Malaysia
Asian Championships
Silver medal – second place	2007 Kuwait City	25 m rapid fire pistol
Southeast Asian Games
Gold medal – first place	2005 Manila	RFP
Silver medal – second place	2007 Bangkok	RFP

Hasli Izwan Amir Hasan (born 22 February 1977 in Ipoh) is a Malaysian sport shooter. He won two medals, gold and silver, in the men's rapid fire pistol at the Southeast Asian Games (2005 in Manila, Philippines, and 2007 in Bangkok, Thailand). He also captured a silver medal in the same event at the 2007 Asian Shooting Championships in Kuwait City, Kuwait, with a total score of 776.6 points, earning him a spot on the Malaysian team for the Olympics.

Hasli represented Malaysia at the 2008 Summer Olympics in Beijing, where he competed in the men's 25 m rapid fire pistol. He finished only in fifteenth place by one point behind Czech Republic's Martin Podhráský, with a total score of 564 points (279 on the first stage, and 285 on the second).
