= Jennifer Lee (equestrian) =

Hong Kong equestrian

Jennifer Snow Lee (born 15 August 1965) is a Hong Kong equestrian.

== Personal life ==
Lee is a native of Virginia in the United States. She is married to Sam Lee Kwok-Tung, a Hong Kong Chinese man, with whom she has two children, and moved to Hong Kong with him in 1994.

== Equestrian career ==
Lee began representing Hong Kong in equestrian competition at the international level soon after her arrival. She won medals in every competition in which she participated since 2001, held Hong Kong's high jump record, and was ranked 11th in the world in the International Federation for Equestrian Sports' World Jumping Challenge.

With Lee's skill, and equestrian at the 2008 Summer Olympics being held in Hong Kong rather than Beijing with the rest of events, it was a natural next step for her to attempt to participate, but her road to the Olympics was filled with obstacles. Lee, along with fellow U.S. citizen showjumpers Jennifer Chang and Charlotte Morse and U.K. citizen dressage rider Aram Gregory, were not successful in obtaining special dispensations from the International Olympic Committee to compete for Hong Kong without holding Chinese nationality. Among them, Lee and Gregory chose to apply to for naturalisation as Chinese nationals to the Hong Kong Immigration Department, which is authorised by Beijing to process Chinese nationality applications from Hong Kong residents. People of Chinese descent born in Hong Kong are permitted to hold multiple citizenship; however, applicants for naturalisation are required to renounce all other citizenships they hold. This was a difficult decision for Lee, in particular due to her concerns about her ability to travel back to her former home to care for her ageing parents; the U.S. is alone among Western countries in not granting visa-free treatment to holders of Hong Kong Special Administrative Region passports, meaning she would have to apply for a United States visa, and could face the possibility of rejection.

Lee was approved for naturalisation in July 2008, but her quest to represent Hong Kong at the Olympics finally faced an insurmountable barrier in the form of an injury to her horse, Mr Burns. The horse was in Belgium undergoing pre-export quarantine at the time. Lee's withdrawal meant that Hong Kong would not field an Olympic show jumping team; Lee's fellow show jumpers Kenneth Cheng, Samantha Lam, and Patrick Lam would go on to compete as individuals.

Lee went on to compete for Hong Kong at the 2010 Asian Games in Guangzhou. She made another attempt to enter the Olympics as a member of the Hong Kong show jumping team which participated in team selection trials for the 2012 Summer Olympics. Lee did well individually, with 17 penalties over two rounds placing her at 17th among 37 contestants, but other members of her team had worse luck, and in the end they failed to qualify.
