= Atsushi Negishi =

Japanese equestrian

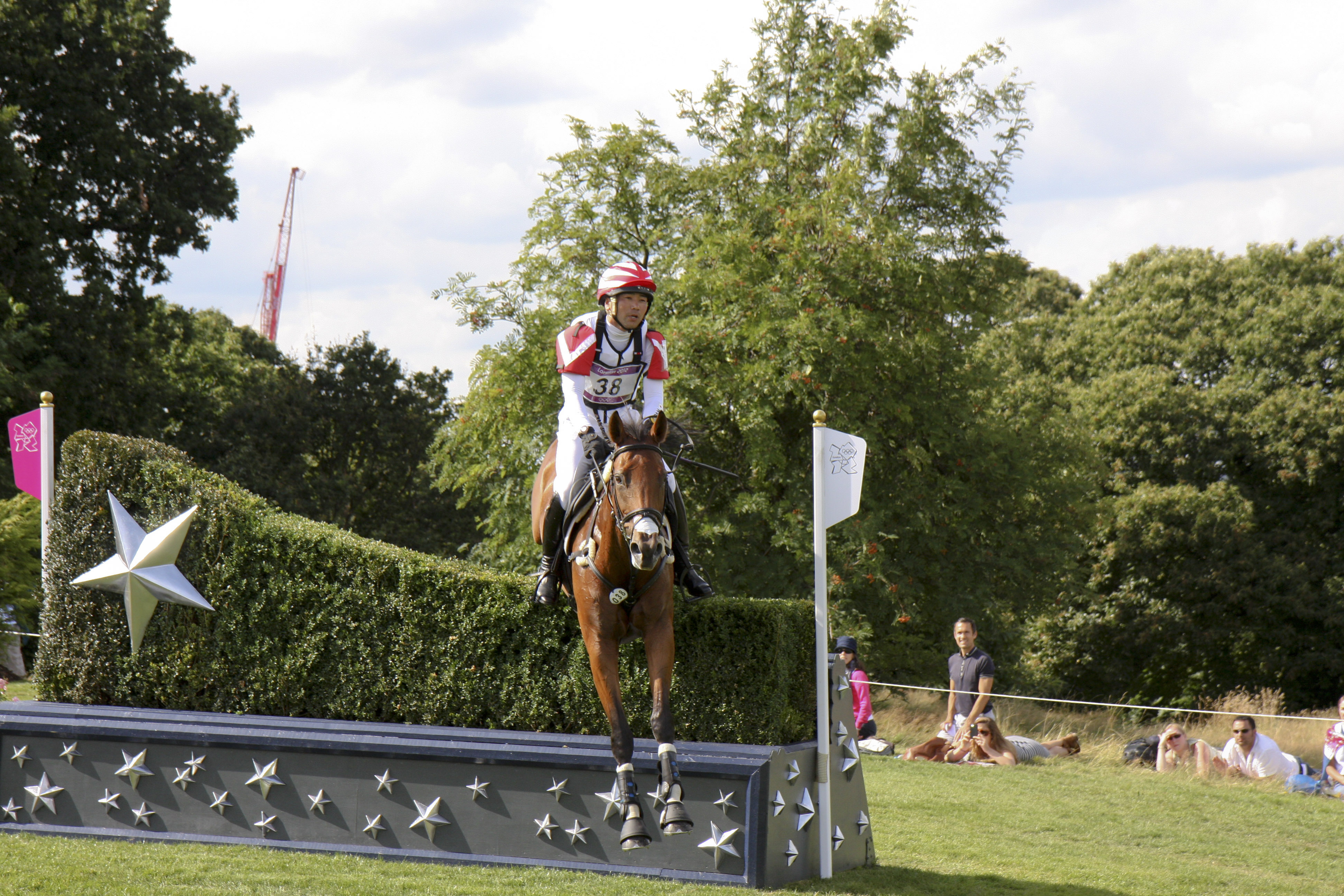
Atsushi Negishi and Pretty Darling competing at the 2012 Summer Olympics in London.

Atsushi Negishi (born 20 March 1977 in Chichibu) is a Japanese equestrian. At the 2012 Summer Olympics he competed in the Individual eventing.
