= World Archery Philippines =

National governing body for archery, Philippines

- Sport: Archery
- Category: National Sport Association
- Abbreviation: WAP
- Affiliation: World Archery Federation
- Location: Philippines
- President: Ebbinghans Reaport https://extranet.worldarchery.sport/documents/index.php/?doc=6962

Official website
- www.worldarchery.sport/member/phi/world-archery-philippines-inc
- (Philippines)

The World Archery Philippines, Inc. is the national governing body for archery in the Philippines. It is used to be known as the Philippines and Philippine Archers' National Network and Alliance (PANNA). It is accredited by the World Archery Federation which is the governing body for the sport of archery in the world.

Its former president was Federico Moreno, the only son of the late German Moreno and the father of 2014 Youth Olympic Games gold-medalist Luis Gabriel Moreno.
