= Table tennis at the 2007 SEA Games – Men's singles =

Table tennis – Men's singles at the 2007 SEA Games
- Venue: Klang Plaza
- Dates: 9 – 10 December 2007
- Competitors: 20 from 10 nations

Medalists
gold medal	Gao Ning	Singapore
silver medal	Nguyen Nam Hai	Vietnam
bronze medal	Phakpoom Sanguansin	Thailand
bronze medal	Phuchong Sanguansin	Thailand

The men's singles competition of the table tennis event at the 2007 SEA Games was held from 9 to 10 December at the Klang Plaza in Nakhon Ratchasima, Thailand.

== Schedule ==
All times are Thailand Time (UTC+07:00).

Date	Time	Round
Sunday, 9 December 2007	10:30	Preliminaries
Monday, 10 December 2007	11:30	Semifinals
Monday, 10 December 2007	15:00	Finals

== Results ==
=== Preliminaries ===
Source: Results (Pools) - Men's Singles

==== Pool 1 ====
Source: Results Pool 1 - Men's Singles

Team	Pld	W	L	GW	GL	PF	PA	Pts
(Thailand) Phuchong Sanguansin	4	4	0	12	2	152	96	8
(Indonesia) Muhammad Hussein	4	3	1	11	3	148	100	7
(Laos) Phonsavath Misay	4	2	2	6	7	106	110	6
(Myanmar) Ye Aung Naing	4	1	3	4	10	110	137	5
(Timor-Leste) Elias A. Barros Da Silva	4	0	4	1	12	63	136	4

9 December 2007; 10:30; Report	Phuchong Sanguansin (THA)	3 – 0	Elias A. Barros Da Silva (TLS)	Klang Plaza; Match 3 Table 1
9 December 2007; 10:30; Report	11 – 2, 11 – 6, 11 – 3

9 December 2007; 10:30; Report	Phonsavath Misay (LAO)	3 – 1	Ye Aung Naing (MYA)	Klang Plaza; Match 4 Table 3
9 December 2007; 10:30; Report	11 – 6, 11 – 4, 4 – 11, 13 – 11

9 December 2007; 13:00; Report	Muhammad Hussein (INA)	3 – 0	Elias A. Barros Da Silva (TLS)	Klang Plaza; Match 13; Table 3
9 December 2007; 13:00; Report	11 – 4, 11 – 3, 11 – 4

9 December 2007; 13:00; Report	Phuchong Sanguansin (THA)	3 – 0	Phonsavath Misay (LAO)	Klang Plaza; Match 14; Table 1
9 December 2007; 13:00; Report	11 – 9, 11 – 3, 11 – 6

9 December 2007; 15:00; Report	Muhammad Hussein (INA)	3 – 0	Ye Aung Naing (MYA)	Klang Plaza; Match 29; Table 1
9 December 2007; 15:00; Report	11 – 2, 11 – 6, 13 – 12

9 December 2007; 15:00; Report	Elias A. Barros Da Silva (TLS)	0 – 3	Phonsavath Misay (LAO)	Klang Plaza; Match 30; Table 3
9 December 2007; 15:00; Report	4 – 11, 4 – 11, 4 – 11

9 December 2007; 17:00; Report	Muhammad Hussein (INA)	3 – 0	Phonsavath Misay (LAO)	Klang Plaza; Match 45; Table 1
9 December 2007; 17:00; Report	11 – 4, 11 – 6, 11 – 4

9 December 2007; 17:00; Report	Ye Aung Naing (MYA)	0 – 3	Phuchong Sanguansin (THA)	Klang Plaza; Match 46; Table 4
9 December 2007; 17:00; Report	8 – 11, 6 – 11, 7 – 11

9 December 2007; 19:00; Report	Muhammad Hussein (INA)	2 – 3	Phuchong Sanguansin (THA)	Klang Plaza; Match 61; Table 1
9 December 2007; 19:00; Report	11 – 9, 9 – 11, 4 – 11, 13 – 11, 9 – 11

9 December 2007; 19:00; Report	' Ye Aung Naing (MYA)	3 – 1	Elias A. Barros Da Silva (TLS)	Klang Plaza; Match 62; Table 4
9 December 2007; 19:00; Report	12 – 10, 3 – 11, 11 – 4, 11 – 4

==== Pool 2 ====
Source: Results Pool 2 - Men's Singles

Team	Pld	W	L	GW	GL	PF	PA	Pts
(Thailand) Phakpoom Sanguansin	4	4	0	12	1	142	79	8
(Philippines) Richard Gonzales	4	3	1	10	3	134	89	7
(Malaysia) Ibrahim Muhd Shakirin	4	2	2	6	6	106	108	6
(Myanmar) Thet Ko Ko Lat	4	1	3	3	9	82	119	5
(Cambodia) Sam Boroath	4	0	4	0	12	64	113	4

9 December 2007; 10:30; Report	Phakpoom Sanguansin (THA)	3 – 0	Sam Boroath (CAM)	Klang Plaza; Match 5 Table 2
9 December 2007; 10:30; Report	11 – 6, 11 – 4, 11 – 6

9 December 2007; 10:30; Report	Ibrahim Muhd Shakirin (MAS)	3 – 0	Thet Ko Ko Lat (MYA)	Klang Plaza; Match 6 Table 4
9 December 2007; 10:30; Report	11 – 8, 11 – 7, 11 – 7

9 December 2007; 13:00; Report	Richard Gonzales (PHI)	3 – 0	Sam Boroath (CAM)	Klang Plaza; Match 15; Table 4
9 December 2007; 13:00; Report	11 – 2, 11 – 3, 11 – 5

9 December 2007; 13:00; Report	Phakpoom Sanguansin (THA)	3 – 0	Ibrahim Muhd Shakirin (MAS)	Klang Plaza; Match 16; Table 2
9 December 2007; 13:00; Report	11 – 8, 11 – 6, 11 – 6

9 December 2007; 15:00; Report	Richard Gonzales (PHI)	3 – 0	Thet Ko Ko Lat (MYA)	Klang Plaza; Match 31; Table 2
9 December 2007; 15:00; Report	11 – 2, 11 – 9, 11 – 5

9 December 2007; 15:00; Report	Sam Boroath (CAM)	0 – 3	Ibrahim Muhd Shakirin (MAS)	Klang Plaza; Match 32; Table 4
9 December 2007; 15:00; Report	4 – 11, 6 – 11, 8 – 11

9 December 2007; 17:00; Report	Richard Gonzales (PHI)	3 – 0	Ibrahim Muhd Shakirin (MAS)	Klang Plaza; Match 47; Table 2
9 December 2007; 17:00; Report	11 – 3, 13 – 11, 11 – 6

9 December 2007; 17:00; Report	Thet Ko Ko Lat (MYA)	0 – 3	Phakpoom Sanguansin (THA)	Klang Plaza; Match 48; Table 3
9 December 2007; 17:00; Report	1 – 11, 3 – 11, 6 – 11

9 December 2007; 19:00; Report	Richard Gonzales (PHI)	1 – 3	Phakpoom Sanguansin (THA)	Klang Plaza; Match 63; Table 2
9 December 2007; 19:00; Report	6 – 11, 10 – 12, 11 – 9, 6 – 11

9 December 2007; 19:00; Report	' Thet Ko Ko Lat (MYA)	3 – 0	Sam Boroath (CAM)	Klang Plaza; Match 64; Table 3
9 December 2007; 19:00; Report	11 – 3, 12 – 10, 11 – 7

==== Pool 3 ====
Source: Results Pool 3 - Men's Singles

Team	Pld	W	L	GW	GL	PF	PA	Pts
(Vietnam) Nguyen Nam Hai	4	4	0	12	2	155	102	8
(Singapore) Yang Zi	4	3	1	10	3	135	82	7
(Philippines) Julius Esposo	4	2	2	7	6	122	117	6
(Laos) Syphaphone Heuang Outhay	4	1	3	3	9	82	119	5
(Timor-Leste) Nilson M. Monis Belo	4	0	4	0	12	59	133	4

9 December 2007; 11:00; Report	Nguyen Nam Hai (VIE)	3 – 0	Nilson M. Monis Belo (TLS)	Klang Plaza; Match 7 Table 2
9 December 2007; 11:00; Report	11 – 2, 11 – 5, 11 – 4

9 December 2007; 11:00; Report	Julius Esposo (PHI)	3 – 0	Syphaphone Heuang Outhay (LAO)	Klang Plaza; Match 8 Table 4
9 December 2007; 11:00; Report	11 – 6, 11 – 9, 11 – 6

9 December 2007; 13:30; Report	Yang Zi (SIN)	3 – 0	Nilson M. Monis Belo (TLS)	Klang Plaza; Match 17; Table 3
9 December 2007; 13:30; Report	11 – 7, 11 – 2, 11 – 2

9 December 2007; 13:30; Report	Nguyen Nam Hai (VIE)	3 – 1	Julius Esposo (PHI)	Klang Plaza; Match 18; Table 1
9 December 2007; 13:30; Report	11 – 13, 11 – 8, 11 – 7, 13 – 11,

9 December 2007; 15:30; Report	Yang Zi (SIN)	3 – 0	Syphaphone Heuang Outhay (LAO)	Klang Plaza; Match 33; Table 2
9 December 2007; 15:30; Report	11 – 2, 11 – 2, 11 – 7

9 December 2007; 15:30; Report	Nilson M. Monis Belo (TLS)	0 – 3	Julius Esposo (PHI)	Klang Plaza; Match 34; Table 4
9 December 2007; 15:30; Report	4 – 11, 4 – 11, 9 – 11

9 December 2007; 17:30; Report	Yang Zi (SIN)	3 – 0	Julius Esposo (PHI)	Klang Plaza; Match 49; Table 1
9 December 2007; 17:30; Report	11 – 4, 11 – 5, 11 – 8

9 December 2007; 17:30; Report	Syphaphone Heuang Outhay (LAO)	0 – 3	Nguyen Nam Hai (VIE)	Klang Plaza; Match 50; Table 3
9 December 2007; 17:30; Report	8 – 11, 6 – 11, 2 – 11

9 December 2007; 19:30; Report	Yang Zi (SIN)	1 – 3	Nguyen Nam Hai (VIE)	Klang Plaza; Match 65; Table 1
9 December 2007; 19:30; Report	7 – 11, 12 – 10, 9 – 11, 8 – 11,

9 December 2007; 19:30; Report	Syphaphone Heuang Outhay (LAO)	3 – 0	Nilson M. Monis Belo (TLS)	Klang Plaza; Match 66; Table 3
9 December 2007; 19:30; Report	12 – 10, 11 – 3, 11 – 7

==== Pool 4 ====
Source: Results Pool 4 - Men's Singles

Team	Pld	W	L	GW	GL	PF	PA	Pts
(Singapore) Gao Ning	4	4	0	12	1	146	89	8
(Vietnam) Doan Kien Quoc	4	3	1	10	4	142	109	7
(Indonesia) Yon Mardiyono	4	2	2	6	7	127	125	6
(Malaysia) Kho Mao Sheng	4	1	3	5	9	113	132	5
(Cambodia) Sun Roathana	4	0	4	0	12	59	132	4

9 December 2007; 11:00; Report	Gao Ning (SIN)	3 – 0	Sun Roathana (CAM)	Klang Plaza; Match 9 Table 1
9 December 2007; 11:00; Report	11 – 1, 11 – 5, 11 – 4

9 December 2007; 11:00; Report	Yon Mardiyono (INA)	3 – 1	Kho Mao Sheng (MAS)	Klang Plaza; Match 10; Table 3
9 December 2007; 11:00; Report	11 – 9, 8 – 11, 11 – 8, 11 – 9

9 December 2007; 13:30; Report	Doan Kien Quoc (VIE)	3 – 0	Sun Roathana (CAM)	Klang Plaza; Match 17; Table 4
9 December 2007; 13:30; Report	11 – 2, 11 – 8, 11 – 5

9 December 2007; 13:30; Report	Gao Ning (SIN)	3 – 0	Yon Mardiyono (INA)	Klang Plaza; Match 18; Table 2
9 December 2007; 13:30; Report	11 – 7, 14 – 12, 11 – 9,

9 December 2007; 15:30; Report	Doan Kien Quoc (VIE)	3 – 1	Kho Mao Sheng (MAS)	Klang Plaza; Match 35; Table 1
9 December 2007; 15:30; Report	11 – 2, 9 – 11, 11 – 4, 11 – 9

9 December 2007; 15:30; Report	Sun Roathana (CAM)	0 – 3	Yon Mardiyono (INA)	Klang Plaza; Match 36; Table 3
9 December 2007; 15:30; Report	7 – 11, 4 – 11, 8 – 11

9 December 2007; 17:30; Report	Doan Kien Quoc (VIE)	3 – 0	Yon Mardiyono (INA)	Klang Plaza; Match 51; Table 2
9 December 2007; 17:30; Report	11 – 9, 11 – 9, 11 – 7

9 December 2007; 17:30; Report	Kho Mao Sheng (MAS)	0 – 3	Gao Ning (SIN)	Klang Plaza; Match 52; Table 4
9 December 2007; 17:30; Report	5 – 11, 2 – 11, 10 – 12

9 December 2007; 19:30; Report	Doan Kien Quoc (VIE)	1 – 3	Gao Ning (SIN)	Klang Plaza; Match 67; Table 2
9 December 2007; 19:30; Report	6 – 11, 11 – 13, 11 – 8, 6 – 11

9 December 2007; 19:30; Report	Kho Mao Sheng (MAS)	3 – 0	Sun Roathana (CAM)	Klang Plaza; Match 68; Table 4
9 December 2007; 19:30; Report	11 – 6, 11 – 4, 11 – 5

=== Elimination rounds ===
Source: Results - Bracket Men's Singles

Semifinals; 10 December 11:30
Phuchong Sanguansin (THA)	1
Gao Ning (SIN)	4
Nguyen Nam Hai (VIE)	4
Phakpoom Sanguansin (THA)	1

Gold medal match 10 December 15:00
Gao Ning (SIN)	4
Nguyen Nam Hai (VIE)	0

==== Semifinals ====
10 December 2007; 11:30; Report	Phuchong Sanguansin (THA)	1 – 4	Gao Ning (SIN)	Klang Plaza; Match 71; Table 1
10 December 2007; 11:30; Report	3 – 11, 9 – 11, 4 – 11, 11 – 7, 4 – 11

10 December 2007; 11:30; Report	Nguyen Nam Hai (VIE)	4 – 1	Phakpoom Sanguansin (THA)	Klang Plaza; Match 72; Table 2
10 December 2007; 11:30; Report	11 – 7, 11 – 13, 11 – 6, 11 – 3, 11 – 6

==== Gold medal match ====
10 December 2007; 15:00; Report	Gao Ning (SIN)	4 – 0	Nguyen Nam Hai (VIE)	Klang Plaza; Match 74; Table 2
10 December 2007; 15:00; Report	11 – 5, 11 – 5, 11 – 7, 11 – 9
