= Table tennis at the 2007 SEA Games – Men's doubles =

Table tennis – Men's doubles at the 2007 SEA Games
- Venue: Klang Plaza
- Dates: 8–9 December 2007
- Competitors: 38 from 10 nations

Medalists
gold medal	Gao Ning; Yang Zi	Singapore
silver medal	Reno Handoyo; Muhammad Hussein	Indonesia
bronze medal	David Jacobs; Yon Mardiyono	Indonesia
bronze medal	Chai Kian Beng; Muhd Shakirin Ibrahim	Malaysia

The men's doubles competition of the table tennis event at the 2007 SEA Games was held from 8 to 9 December at the Klang Plaza in Nakhon Ratchasima, Thailand.

== Participating nations ==
A total of 38 athletes from ten nations competed in men's doubles table tennis at the 2007 Southeast Asian Games:

- Cambodia (4)
- Indonesia (4)
- Laos (4)
- Malaysia (4)
- Myanmar (4)
- Philippines (4)
- Singapore (4)
- Timor-Leste (2)
- Thailand (4)
- Vietnam (4)

== Schedule ==
All times are Thailand Time (UTC+07:00).

Date	Time	Round
Saturday, 8 December 2007	10:00	Round of 32
Saturday, 8 December 2007	10:30	Round of 16
Saturday, 8 December 2007	14:00	Quarterfinals
Saturday, 8 December 2007	15:00	Semifinals
Sunday, 9 December 2007	20:30	Final

== Results ==
Source: Event Summary

=== Round of 32 ===
8 December 10:00

Goon W./Kho MS (Malaysia)	0–3	(Philippines) R Gonzales/H Ortalla	5 – 11, 6 – 11, 4 – 11
Phonsavath M/Syphaphone HO (Laos)	3–0	(Timor-Leste) EA Barros da Silva/NM Monis Belo	11 – 2, 11 – 5, 11 – 9
Lin ZO/Sein L (Myanmar)	0–3	(Philippines) RI Valle/J Esposo	3 – 11, 5 – 11, 2 – 11

=== Final 16 ===
Round of 16; 8 December 10:30
(Indonesia) D Jacobs (Indonesia) Y Mardiyono	11	11	11	3
(Cambodia) Huot S (Cambodia) Ngoy B	2	1	5	0
(Myanmar) Thet KKL (Myanmar) Ye AN	2	5	7	0
(Thailand) Pha Sanguansin (Thailand) Phu Sanguansin	11	11	11	3
(Vietnam) Dinh QL (Vietnam) Doan KQ	11	6	11	4	11	3
(Philippines) R Gonzales (Philippines) H Ortalla	9	11	8	11	9	2
(Laos) K Chansamone (Laos) X Korakanh	5	6	5	0
(Singapore) Gao N (Singapore) Yang Z	11	11	11	3
(Indonesia) R Handoyo (Indonesia) M Hussein	11	11	11	3
(Cambodia) Sam B (Cambodia) Sun R	5	3	4	0
(Laos) P Misay (Laos) SH Outhay	5	6	6	0
(Thailand) C Chaitat (Thailand) S Vipawatanakul	11	11	11	3
(Malaysia) Chai KB (Malaysia) MI Shakirin	11	12	9	11	3
(Philippines) RI Valle (Philippines) J Esposo	7	10	11	7	1
(Singapore) Cai X (Singapore) Pang X	4	11	14	11	11	3
(Vietnam) Nguyen NH (Vietnam) Tran TQ	11	3	16	5	9	2

Quarterfinal; 8 December 14:00
(Indonesia) D Jacobs (Indonesia) Y Mardiyono	6	11	11	7	11	3
(Thailand) Pha Sanguansin (Thailand) Phu Sanguansin	11	7	8	11	4	2
(Vietnam) Dinh QL (Vietnam) Doan KQ	11	6	4	4	1
(Singapore) Gao N (Singapore) Yang Z	9	11	11	11	3
(Indonesia) R Handoyo (Indonesia) M Hussein	11	11	11	3
(Thailand) C Chaitat (Thailand) S Vipawatanakul	8	1	9	0
(Malaysia) Chai KB (Malaysia) MI Shakirin	12	11	7	11	3
(Singapore) Cai X (Singapore) Pang X	10	7	11	3	1

Semifinal; 8 December 15:00
(Indonesia) D Jacobs (Indonesia) Y Mardiyono	10	11	7	11	10	2
(Singapore) Gao N (Singapore) Yang Z	12	7	11	12	3
(Indonesia) R Handoyo (Indonesia) M Hussein	11	11	10	14	3
(Malaysia) Chai KB (Malaysia) MI Shakirin	7	7	12	12	1

Final; 9 December 20:30
(Singapore) Gao N (Singapore) Yang Z	11	11	12	3
(Indonesia) R Handoyo (Indonesia) M Hussein	8	4	10	0
