= Table tennis at the 2007 SEA Games – Mixed doubles =

Table tennis – Mixed doubles at the 2007 SEA Games
- Venue: Klang Plaza
- Dates: 7–8 December 2007
- Competitors: 34 from 9 nations

Medalists
gold medal	Yang Zi; Li Jiawei	Singapore
silver medal	Gao Ning; Sun Beibei	Singapore
bronze medal	Phakpoom Sanguansin; Nanthana Komwong	Thailand
bronze medal	Phuchong Sanguansin; Anisara Muangsuk	Thailand

The mixed doubles competition of the table tennis event at the 2007 SEA Games was held from 7 to 8 December at the Klang Plaza in Nakhon Ratchasima, Thailand.

== Participating nations ==
A total of 34 athletes from nine nations competed in mixed doubles table tennis at the 2007 Southeast Asian Games:

- Cambodia (2)
- Indonesia (4)
- Laos (4)
- Malaysia (4)
- Myanmar (4)
- Philippines (4)
- Singapore (4)
- Thailand (4)
- Vietnam (4)

== Schedule ==
All times are Thailand Time (UTC+07:00).

Date	Time	Round
Friday, 7 December 2007	10:00	Round of 32
Friday, 7 December 2007	10:30	Round of 16
Friday, 7 December 2007	14:00	Quarterfinals
Friday, 7 December 2007	15:00	Semifinals
Saturday, 8 December 2007	16:30	Final

== Results ==
Source: Event Summary

=== Round of 32 ===
8 December 10:00

Huto S./Long D. (Cambodia)	1 – 3	(Myanmar) S. Han/Thet K. K.	11 – 7, 7 – 11, 7 – 11, 15 – 17

=== Final 16 ===
Round of 16; 7 December 10:30
(Malaysia) MS Ibrahim (Malaysia) Beh LW	11	11	11	3
(Laos) SH Outhay (Laos) S Sysavath	4	5	6	0
(Philippines) RI Valle (Philippines) SA Balatbat	9	3	6	0
(Thailand) P Sanguansin (Thailand) A Muangsuk	11	11	11	3
(Indonesia) R Handoyo (Indonesia) CN Jusma	11	11	11	3
(Myanmar) Ye AN (Myanmar) Aye MT	4	1	6	0
(Vietnam) Dinh QL (Vietnam) Luong TT	6	3	12	0
(Singapore) Yang Z (Singapore) Li J	11	11	14	3
(Thailand) P Sanguansin (Thailand) N Komwong	11	5	5	11	13	3
(Vietnam) Mai HMT (Vietnam) Nguyen NH	6	11	11	7	11	2
(Myanmar) S. Han (Myanmar) Thet K. K.	2	5	4	0
(Malaysia) Chai KB (Malaysia) Ng SK	11	11	11	3
(Indonesia) M Hussein (Indonesia) C Ferliana	11	11	11	3
(Philippines) J Esposo (Philippines) I Lariba	3	4	4	0
(Laos) P Misay (Laos) S Thiphakone	5	1	8	0
(Singapore) Gao N (Singapore) Sun B	11	11	11	3

Quarterfinal; 7 December 14:00
(Malaysia) MS Ibrahim (Malaysia) Beh LW	11	4	5	9	1
(Thailand) P Sanguansin (Thailand) A Muangsuk	9	11	11	11	3
(Indonesia) R Handoyo (Indonesia) CN Jusma	8	9	11	4	1
(Singapore) Yang Z (Singapore) Li J	11	11	4	11	3
(Thailand) P Sanguansin (Thailand) N Komwong	11	12	11	3
(Malaysia) Chai KB (Malaysia) Ng SK	6	10	9	0
(Indonesia) M Hussein (Indonesia) C Ferliana	11	7	8	9	1
(Singapore) Gao N (Singapore) Sun B	7	11	11	11	3

Semifinal; 7 December 15:00
(Thailand) P Sanguansin (Thailand) A Muangsuk	5	4	6	0
(Singapore) Yang Z (Singapore) Li J	11	11	13	3
(Thailand) P Sanguansin (Thailand) N Komwong	7	14	2	11	4	2
(Singapore) Gao N (Singapore) Sun B	11	12	11	7	11	3

Final; 8 December 16:30
(Singapore) Yang Z (Singapore) Li J	11	11	10	11	3
(Singapore) Gao N (Singapore) Sun B	6	7	12	5	1
