= Table tennis at the 2007 SEA Games – Women's singles =

Table Tennis Event Of 2007

Table tennis – Women's singles at the 2007 SEA Games
- Venue: Klang Plaza
- Dates: 9 – 10 December 2007
- Competitors: 17 from 9 nations

Medalists
| gold medal | Wang Yuegu | Singapore |
| silver medal | Ng Sock Khim | Malaysia |
| bronze medal | Nanthana Komwong | Thailand |
| bronze medal | Anisara Muangsuk | Thailand |

The women's singles competition of the table tennis event at the 2007 SEA Games was held from 9 to 10 December at the Klang Plaza in Nakhon Ratchasima, Thailand.

== Schedule ==
All times are Thailand Time (UTC+07:00).

| Date | Time | Round |
|---|---|---|
| Sunday, 9 December 2007 | 10:00 | Preliminaries |
| Monday, 10 December 2007 | 10:30 | Semifinals |
| Monday, 10 December 2007 | 14:00 | Finals |

== Results ==
=== Preliminaries ===
Source: Results (Pools) - Women's Singles

==== Pool 1 ====
Source: Results Pool 1 - Women's Singles

| Team | Pld | W | L | GW | GL | PF | PA | Pts |
|---|---|---|---|---|---|---|---|---|
| (Malaysia) Ng Sock Khim | 3 | 3 | 0 | 9 | 2 | 124 | 83 | 6 |
| (Singapore) Li Jiawei | 3 | 2 | 1 | 8 | 4 | 121 | 91 | 5 |
| (Vietnam) Mai Xuan Hang | 3 | 1 | 2 | 4 | 6 | 82 | 88 | 4 |
| (Laos) Douangpanya Seangdavieng | 3 | 0 | 3 | 0 | 9 | 34 | 99 | 3 |

| 9 December 2007; 14:00; Report | Li Jiawei (SIN) | 3 – 0 | Douangpanya Seangdavieng (LAO) | Klang Plaza; Match 21; Table 2 |
| 9 December 2007; 14:00; Report | 11 – 3, 11 – 3, 11 – 5 |

| 9 December 2007; 14:00; Report | Ng Sock Khim (MAS) | 3 – 0 | Mai Xuan Hang (VIE) | Klang Plaza; Match 22; Table 1 |
| 9 December 2007; 14:00; Report | 11 – 3, 11 – 7, 15 – 13 |

| 9 December 2007; 16:00; Report | Li Jiawei (SIN) | 3 – 1 | Mai Xuan Hang (VIE) | Klang Plaza; Match 37; Table 1 |
| 9 December 2007; 16:00; Report | 5 – 11, 11 – 8, 11 – 3, 11 – 4 |

| 9 December 2007; 16:00; Report | Douangpanya Seangdavieng (LAO) | 0 – 3 | Ng Sock Khim (MAS) | Klang Plaza; Match 38; Table 3 |
| 9 December 2007; 16:00; Report | 5 – 11, 2 – 11, 3 – 11 |

| 9 December 2007; 18:00; Report | Li Jiawei (SIN) | 2 – 3 | Ng Sock Khim (MAS) | Klang Plaza; Match 53; Table 1 |
| 9 December 2007; 18:00; Report | 9 – 11, 11 – 9, 14 – 12, 9 – 11, 7 – 11 |

| 9 December 2007; 18:00; Report | Mai Xuan Hang (VIE) | 3 – 0 | Douangpanya Seangdavieng (LAO) | Klang Plaza; Match 54; Table 3 |
| 9 December 2007; 18:00; Report | 11 – 6, 11 – 5, 11 – 2 |

==== Pool 2 ====
Source: Results Pool 2 - Women's Singles

| Team | Pld | W | L | GW | GL | PF | PA | Pts |
|---|---|---|---|---|---|---|---|---|
| (Thailand) Nanthana Komwong | 3 | 3 | 0 | 9 | 2 | 112 | 69 | 6 |
| (Malaysia) Beh Lee Wei | 3 | 2 | 1 | 8 | 3 | 112 | 89 | 5 |
| (Vietnam) Mai Hoang My Trang | 3 | 1 | 2 | 3 | 7 | 92 | 101 | 4 |
| (Laos) Southammavong Thiphakone | 3 | 0 | 3 | 1 | 9 | 53 | 110 | 3 |

| 9 December 2007; 14:00; Report | Nanthana Komwong (THA) | 3 – 0 | Southammavong Thiphakone (LAO) | Klang Plaza; Match 23; Table 4 |
| 9 December 2007; 14:00; Report | 11 – 5, 11 – 4, 11 – 5 |

| 9 December 2007; 14:00; Report | Beh Lee Wei (MAS) | 3 – 0 | Mai Hoang My Trang (VIE) | Klang Plaza; Match 24; Table 3 |
| 9 December 2007; 14:00; Report | 15 – 13, 14 – 12, 11 – 7 |

| 9 December 2007; 16:00; Report | Nanthana Komwong (THA) | 3 – 0 | Mai Hoang My Trang (VIE) | Klang Plaza; Match 39; Table 2 |
| 9 December 2007; 16:00; Report | 11 – 4, 11 – 7, 11 – 5 |

| 9 December 2007; 16:00; Report | Southammavong Thiphakone (LAO) | 0 – 3 | Beh Lee Wei (MAS) | Klang Plaza; Match 40; Table 4 |
| 9 December 2007; 16:00; Report | 2 – 11, 2 – 11, 7 – 11 |

| 9 December 2007; 18:00; Report | Nanthana Komwong (THA) | 3 – 2 | Beh Lee Wei (MAS) | Klang Plaza; Match 55; Table 2 |
| 9 December 2007; 18:00; Report | 11 – 5, 9 – 11, 4 – 11, 11 – 8, 11 – 4 |

| 9 December 2007; 18:00; Report | Mai Hoang My Trang (VIE) | 3 – 1 | Southammavong Thiphakone (LAO) | Klang Plaza; Match 56; Table 4 |
| 9 December 2007; 18:00; Report | 11 – 3, 11 – 13, 11 – 5, 11 – 7 |

==== Pool 3 ====
Source: Results Pool 3 - Women's Singles

| Team | Pld | W | L | GW | GL | PF | PA | Pts |
|---|---|---|---|---|---|---|---|---|
| (Thailand) Anisara Muangsuk | 3 | 3 | 0 | 9 | 0 | 121 | 72 | 6 |
| (Indonesia) Christine Ferliana | 3 | 2 | 1 | 6 | 5 | 119 | 81 | 5 |
| (Philippines) Ian Lariba | 3 | 1 | 2 | 3 | 7 | 58 | 85 | 4 |
| (Myanmar) Aye Myat Thu | 3 | 0 | 3 | 3 | 9 | 39 | 99 | 3 |

| 9 December 2007; 14:30; Report | Christine Ferliana (INA) | 3 – 0 | Ian Lariba (PHI) | Klang Plaza; Match 25; Table 2 |
| 9 December 2007; 14:30; Report | 11 – 3, 11 – 4, 11 – 8 |

| 9 December 2007; 14:30; Report | Anisara Muangsuk (THA) | 3 – 0 | Aye Myat Thu (MYA) | Klang Plaza; Match 26; Table 1 |
| 9 December 2007; 14:30; Report | 11 – 1, 11 – 2, 11 – 6 |

| 9 December 2007; 16:30; Report | Christine Ferliana (INA) | 3 – 0 | Aye Myat Thu (MYA) | Klang Plaza; Match 41; Table 1 |
| 9 December 2007; 16:30; Report | 11 – 3, 11 – 5, 11 – 3 |

| 9 December 2007; 16:30; Report | Ian Lariba (PHI) | 0 – 3 | Anisara Muangsuk (THA) | Klang Plaza; Match 42; Table 4 |
| 9 December 2007; 16:30; Report | 3 – 11, 4 – 11, 3 – 11 |

| 9 December 2007; 18:30; Report | Christine Ferliana (INA) | 2 – 3 | Anisara Muangsuk (THA) | Klang Plaza; Match 57; Table 1 |
| 9 December 2007; 18:30; Report | 11 – 5, 9 – 11, 12 – 10, 5 – 11, 16– 18 |

| 9 December 2007; 18:30; Report | Aye Myat Thu (MYA) | 0 – 3 | Ian Lariba (PHI) | Klang Plaza; Match 58; Table 3 |
| 9 December 2007; 18:30; Report | 4 – 11, 6 – 11, 9 – 11 |

==== Pool 4 ====
Source: Results Pool 4 - Women's Singles

| Team | Pld | W | L | GW | GL | PF | PA | Pts |
|---|---|---|---|---|---|---|---|---|
| (Singapore) Wang Yuegu | 4 | 4 | 0 | 12 | 0 | 133 | 55 | 8 |
| (Indonesia) Ceria Nilasari Jusma | 4 | 3 | 1 | 9 | 5 | 130 | 100 | 7 |
| (Philippines) Sendrina Andrea Balatbat | 4 | 2 | 2 | 8 | 7 | 129 | 166 | 6 |
| (Myanmar) Swe Swe Han | 4 | 1 | 3 | 4 | 10 | 100 | 134 | 5 |
| (Cambodia) Long Dianna | 4 | 0 | 4 | 1 | 12 | 55 | 141 | 4 |

| 9 December 2007; 10:00; Report | Ceria Nilasari Jusma (INA) | 3 – 0 | Long Dianna (CAM) | Klang Plaza; Match 1 Table 1 |
| 9 December 2007; 10:00; Report | 11 – 4, 11 – 2, 11 – 2 |

| 9 December 2007; 10:00; Report | Swe Swe Han (MYA) | 1 – 3 | Sendrina Andrea Balatbat (PHI) | Klang Plaza; Match 2 Table 2 |
| 9 December 2007; 10:00; Report | 11 – 1, 4 – 11, 6 – 11, 8 – 11 |

| 9 December 2007; 11:30; Report | Wang Yuegu (SIN) | 3 – 0 | Long Dianna (CAM) | Klang Plaza; Match 11; Table 2 |
| 9 December 2007; 11:30; Report | 11 – 6, 11 – 5, 11 – 2 |

| 9 December 2007; 11:30; Report | Ceria Nilasari Jusma (INA) | 3 – 0 | Swe Swe Han (MYA) | Klang Plaza; Match 12; Table 1 |
| 9 December 2007; 11:30; Report | 11 – 7, 11 – 6, 11 – 3 |

| 9 December 2007; 14:30; Report | Wang Yuegu (SIN) | 3 – 0 | Sendrina Andrea Balatbat (PHI) | Klang Plaza; Match 27; Table 3 |
| 9 December 2007; 14:30; Report | 11 – 1, 11 – 4, 11 – 6 |

| 9 December 2007; 14:30; Report | Long Dianna (CAM) | 1 – 3 | Swe Swe Han (MYA) | Klang Plaza; Match 28; Table 4 |
| 9 December 2007; 14:30; Report | 3 – 11, 11 – 9, 7 – 11, 7 – 11 |

| 9 December 2007; 16:30; Report | Wang Yuegu (SIN) | 3 – 0 | Swe Swe Han (MYA) | Klang Plaza; Match 43; Table 2 |
| 9 December 2007; 16:30; Report | 11 – 2, 11 – 3, 11 – 8 |

| 9 December 2007; 16:30; Report | Sendrina Andrea Balatbat (PHI) | 2 – 3 | Ceria Nilasari Jusma (INA) | Klang Plaza; Match 44; Table 3 |
| 9 December 2007; 16:30; Report | 11 – 9, 5 – 11, 11 – 4, 8 – 11, 8 – 11 |

| 9 December 2007; 18:30; Report | Wang Yuegu (SIN) | 3 – 0 | Ceria Nilasari Jusma (INA) | Klang Plaza; Match 59; Table 2 |
| 9 December 2007; 18:30; Report | 11 – 4, 11 – 7, 11 – 7 |

| 9 December 2007; 18:30; Report | Sendrina Andrea Balatbat (PHI) | 3 – 0 | Long Dianna (CAM) | Klang Plaza; Match 60; Table 4 |
| 9 December 2007; 18:30; Report | 11 – 3, 11 – 4, 11 – 1 |

=== Elimination rounds ===
Source: Results - Bracket Women's Singles

Semifinals; 10 December 10:30
Ng Sock Khim (MAS) | 4
Anisara Muangsuk (THA) | 2
Wang Yuegu (SIN) | 4
Nanthana Komwong (THA) | 2

Gold medal match 10 December 14:00
Ng Sock Khim (MAS) | 0
Wang Yuegu (SIN) | 4

==== Semifinals ====
| 10 December 2007; 15:00; Report | Ng Sock Khim (MAS) | 4 – 2 | Anisara Muangsuk (THA) | Klang Plaza; Match 69; Table 1 |
| 10 December 2007; 15:00; Report | 11 – 4, 8 – 11, 11 – 9, 6 – 11, 11 – 9, 15 – 13 |

| 10 December 2007; 15:00; Report | Wang Yuegu (SIN) | 4 – 2 | Nanthana Komwong (THA) | Klang Plaza; Match 70; Table 2 |
| 10 December 2007; 15:00; Report | 8 – 11, 8 – 11, 11 – 9, 11 – 7, 11 – 7, 11 – 5 |

==== Gold medal match ====
| 10 December 2007; 14:00; Report | Ng Sock Khim (MAS) | 0 – 4 | Wang Yuegu (SIN) | Klang Plaza; Match 73; Table 2 |
| 10 December 2007; 14:00; Report | 4 – 11, 8 – 11, 2 – 11, 4 – 11 |
