= Klinger =

Klinger may refer to:

- Klinger (surname), a list of people with the surname
- Corporal Klinger, a character from M*A*S*H
- Klinger (horse), owned by the US Army
- Klinger (band), an Australia band from 1996 to 2003
- Klinger Ridge, Marie Byrd Land, Antarctica
- Klinger Lake, near Klingers, Michigan, United States
- 22369 Klinger, a main-belt asteroid

== See also ==
- Clinger (disambiguation)
- Klingers, Michigan, United States, an unincorporated community
- Jan Klingers (1929–1994), Dutch sprint canoer
- Klingler, surname
