= Table tennis at the 2007 SEA Games =

- Venue: Klang Plaza
- Location: Nakhon Ratchasima, Thailand
- Dates: 3 – 10 December
- Competitors: 80 from 10 nations

Table tennis events at the 2007 SEA Games took place in the Klang Plaza from 3 to 10 December 2007. Singapore swept all seven gold medals at stake for the first time in the history of the games.

== Participating nations ==
- Cambodia (5)
- Indonesia (7)
- Laos (10)
- Malaysia (8)
- Myanmar (10)
- Philippines (8)
- Singapore (10)
- Thailand (10)
- Timor-Leste (2)
- Vietnam (10)

There was no participation from Brunei.

== Competition schedule ==
The following is the competition schedule for the table tennis competitions:

P	Preliminary	¼	Quarterfinals	½	Semifinals	F	Final

Event↓/Date →	Mon 3	Tue 4	Wed 5		Thu 6	Fri 7			Sat 8			Sun 9	Mon 10	
Men's singles												P	½	F
Women's singles												P	½	F
Men's doubles									P	¼	½	F		
Women's doubles									P	¼	½	F		
Mixed doubles						P	¼	½	F					
Men's team	P	P	½	F										
Women's team	P	P	½	F										

== Medalists ==
Event	Gold	Silver	Bronze
Men's singles	Gao Ning; Singapore	Nguyễn Nam Hải; Vietnam	Phakpoom Sanguansin; Thailand
Men's singles	Gao Ning; Singapore	Nguyễn Nam Hải; Vietnam	Phuchong Sanguansin; Thailand
Women's singles	Wang Yuegu; Singapore	Ng Sock Khim; Malaysia	Nanthana Komwong; Thailand
Women's singles	Wang Yuegu; Singapore	Ng Sock Khim; Malaysia	Anisara Muangsuk; Thailand
Men's doubles	Singapore; Gao Ning; Yang Zi	Indonesia; Reno Handoyo; Muhammad Hussein	Indonesia; David Jacobs; Yon Mardiyono
Men's doubles	Singapore; Gao Ning; Yang Zi	Indonesia; Reno Handoyo; Muhammad Hussein	Malaysia; Chai Kian Beng; Muhd Shakirin Ibrahim
Women's doubles	Singapore; Sun Beibei; Yu Mengyu	Singapore; Li Jiawei; Wang Yuegu	Indonesia; Christine Ferliana; Ceria Nilasari Jusma
Women's doubles	Singapore; Sun Beibei; Yu Mengyu	Singapore; Li Jiawei; Wang Yuegu	Thailand; Nanthana Komwong; Anisara Muangsuk
Mixed doubles	Singapore; Yang Zi; Li Jiawei	Singapore; Gao Ning; Sun Beibei	Thailand; Phakpoom Sanguansin; Nanthana Komwong
Mixed doubles	Singapore; Yang Zi; Li Jiawei	Singapore; Gao Ning; Sun Beibei	Thailand; Phuchong Sanguansin; Anisara Muangsuk
Men's team	Singapore; Cai Xiaoli; Gao Ning; Jason Ho Jiaren; Pang Xuejie; Yang Zi	Thailand; Chaisit Chaitat; Phakpoom Sanguansin; Phuchong Sanguansin; Sithichok Vipawatanakul; Tanawat Vipawatanakul	Indonesia; Reno Handoyo; Muhammad Hussein; David Jacobs; Yon Mardiyono
Men's team	Singapore; Cai Xiaoli; Gao Ning; Jason Ho Jiaren; Pang Xuejie; Yang Zi	Thailand; Chaisit Chaitat; Phakpoom Sanguansin; Phuchong Sanguansin; Sithichok Vipawatanakul; Tanawat Vipawatanakul	Vietnam; Đinh Quang Linh; Đỗ Đức Duy; Đoàn Kiến Quốc; Nguyễn Nam Hải; Trần Tuấn Quỳnh
Women's team	Singapore; Li Jiawei; Sun Beibei; Tan Paey Fern; Wang Yuegu; Yu Mengyu	Thailand; Nanthana Komwong; Anisara Muangsuk; Suttilux Rattanaprayoon; Priyakan Triampo; Tidaporn Vongboon	Malaysia; Beh Lee Wei; Chiu Soo Jiin; Gam Gaik Ding; Ng Sock Khim
Women's team	Singapore; Li Jiawei; Sun Beibei; Tan Paey Fern; Wang Yuegu; Yu Mengyu	Thailand; Nanthana Komwong; Anisara Muangsuk; Suttilux Rattanaprayoon; Priyakan Triampo; Tidaporn Vongboon	Vietnam; Lương Thị Tám; Mai Hoàng Mỹ Trang; Mai Xuân Hằng; Phạm Thị Thiên Kim; Vũ Thị Hà

== Medal tally ==
* Host nation (Thailand)

Rank	Nation	Gold	Silver	Bronze	Total
1	Singapore (SIN)	7	2	0	9
2	Thailand (THA)*	0	2	7	9
3	Indonesia (INA)	0	1	3	4
4	Malaysia (MAS)	0	1	2	3
4	Vietnam (VIE)	0	1	2	3
Totals (5 entries)		7	7	14	28

Preceded by 2005	Table tennis at the SEA Games; 2007 SEA Games	Succeeded by 2009
