= Table tennis at the 2007 SEA Games – Women's doubles =

Table tennis – Women's doubles at the 2007 SEA Games
- Venue: Klang Plaza
- Dates: 8–9 December 2007
- Competitors: 28 from 8 nations

Medalists
gold medal	Sun Beibei; Yu Mengyu	Singapore
silver medal	Li Jiawei; Wang Yuegu	Singapore
bronze medal	Christine Ferliana; Ceria Nilasari Jusma	Indonesia
bronze medal	Nanthana Komwong; Anisara Muangsuk	Thailand

The women's doubles competition of the table tennis event at the 2007 SEA Games was held from 8 to 9 December at the Klang Plaza in Nakhon Ratchasima, Thailand.

== Participating nations ==
A total of 28 athletes from eight nations competed in women's doubles table tennis at the 2007 Southeast Asian Games:

- Indonesia (2)
- Laos (4)
- Malaysia (4)
- Myanmar (4)
- Philippines (2)
- Singapore (4)
- Thailand (4)
- Vietnam (4)

== Schedule ==
All times are Thailand Time (UTC+07:00).

Date	Time	Round
Saturday, 8 December 2007	11:30	Round of 16
Saturday, 8 December 2007	14:00	Quarterfinals
Saturday, 8 December 2007	15:30	Semifinals
Sunday, 9 December 2007	20:30	Final

== Results ==
Source: Event Summary

=== Final 16 ===
Round of 16; 8 December 11:30
(Myanmar) Nyo M. (Myanmar) Thandar A	3	3	6	0
(Thailand) S Rattanaprayoon (Thailand) P Triampo	11	11	11	3
(Malaysia) Chiu SJ (Malaysia) Gam GD	11	11	12	3
(Laos) Douangpanya S. (Laos) Doungpanya S.	9	4	10	0
(Vietnam) Mai HMT (Vietnam) Mai XH	5	5	4	0
(Singapore) Sun B (Singapore) Yu M	11	11	11	3
(Singapore) Li J (Singapore) Wang Y	11	11	11	3
(Laos) Manychanh D (Laos) Southammavong T	3	5	3	0
(Philippines) SA Balatbat (Philippines) I Lariba	7	11	4	2	1
(Vietnam) Luong TT (Vietnam) Vu TH	11	9	11	11	3
(Malaysia) Beh LW (Malaysia) Ng SK	11	11	11	3
(Myanmar) Swe SH (Myanmar) Aye MT	5	8	1	0

Quarterfinal; 8 December 14:00
(Indonesia) C Ferliana (Indonesia) CN Jusma	11	11	11	3
(Thailand) S Rattanaprayoon (Thailand) P Triampo	4	3	5	0
(Malaysia) Chiu SJ (Malaysia) Gam GD	6	2	6	0
(Singapore) Sun B (Singapore) Yu M	11	11	11	3
(Singapore) Li J (Singapore) Wang Y	11	11	11	3
(Vietnam) Luong TT (Vietnam) Vu TH	9	7	5	0
(Malaysia) Beh LW (Malaysia) Ng SK	11	11	4	9	1	2
(Thailand) Nanthana K (Thailand) Anisara M	8	5	11	11	11	3

Semifinal; 8 December 15:30
(Indonesia) C Ferliana (Indonesia) CN Jusma	8	3	16	11	11	2
(Singapore) Sun B (Singapore) Yu M	11	11	14	9	13	3
(Singapore) Li J (Singapore) Wang Y	14	11	8	13	3
(Thailand) Nanthana K (Thailand) Anisara M	12	4	11	11	1

Final; 9 December 20:30
(Singapore) Sun B (Singapore) Yu M	11	13	11	11	3
(Singapore) Li J (Singapore) Wang Y	7	15	6	6	1
