= Kolinger =

Kolinger is a German surname. Notable people with the surname include:

- Denis Kolinger (born 1994), German-born Croatian footballer
- Dubravko Kolinger (born 1975), German footballer

== See also ==
- Klinger (surname)
