= Clang (disambiguation) =

Clang is a computer program.

Clang may also refer to:

== Arts and entertainment ==
- Clang (music) or klang, a musical term
- Glas (book), also translated as Clang, a 1974 book by Jacques Derrida
- Clang, a cancelled video game by Neal Stephenson
- "Clang", a song from the 2018 album World Domination by Band-Maid
- Clang, a character in the television series H.R. Pufnstuf

== People ==
- Calle Clang (born 2002), Swedish ice hockey goaltender
- John Clang (born 1973), Singaporean visual artist, photographer, and filmmaker

== Medicine ==
- Clanging or clang associations, pattern of disorganized speech seen in some mental disorders

== See also ==
- Cling (disambiguation)
- Klang (disambiguation)
