= Klang =

Klang (/ˈklæŋ/; German: [klaŋ]) may refer to:

== Music ==
- Klang (music), a concept in Riemannian and Schenkerian theories based on the German word Klang, meaning 'resonance' or 'sound
- Klang (Stockhausen) (2004–2007), cycle of compositions by Karlheinz Stockhausen
- Klang (album), the third studio album by The Rakes
- Kling Klang Studio, the private music studio of the band Kraftwerk
- Klang Box, a special-edition boxed set compilation of music by Kraftwerk
- Der ferne Klang, opera by Franz Schreker
- Klang, a band formed by Donna Matthews after the breakup of Elastica

== Places ==
=== Malaysia ===
- Klang River, river that flows through the state of Selangor and territory of Kuala Lumpur into the strait of Malacca
- Klang Valley, district in Selangor surrounding Klang river
  - Klang (city), the royal capital of the state of Selangor
  - Klang (federal constituency), represented in the Dewan Rakyat
  - Klang District, a district that contains the city of Klang, but does not administer it
  - Ulu Klang
  - Bandar Klang (state constituency), formerly represented in the Selangor State Legislative Assembly (1974–86; 1995–2004)
  - New Klang Valley Expressway
  - Klang Parade
  - North Klang Straits Bypass
  - Klang Komuter station
  - Jalan Klang Lama
  - Klang Sentral
  - Duta–Ulu Klang Expressway
  - Klang–Banting Highway
  - South Klang Valley Expressway
  - New North Klang Straits Bypass
  - Genting Klang–Pahang Highway
  - Klang Gates Dam
  - Klang High School
  - Gurdwara Sahib Klang
  - Bandar Bukit Tinggi
  - Pandamaran
  - Bandar Baru Klang
- Port Klang
  - Port Klang Line
  - Port Klang Komuter station
  - Pelabuhan Kelang (federal constituency), represented in the Dewan Rakyat (1974–86)
  - Pelabuhan Klang (state constituency), represented in the Selangor State Legislative Assembly (1995–present)
- Klang War, series of conflicts in the Malay state of Selangor

=== France ===
- Klang, Moselle, a commune in the Moselle department in Lorraine in northeastern France

=== Thailand ===
- Ban Klang: Ban Klang, San Pa Tong or Ban Klang, Wang Thong
- San Klang: San Klang, San Kamphaeng or San Klang, San Pa Tong
- Na Klang District
- Klang Plaza

== People ==
- Donnie Klang (born 1985), singer from New York City and Making the Band 4 contestant
- Gary Klang (born 1941), Haitian-Canadian poet and novelist
- Klaus Klang (born 1959), musician from Brussels, Belgium

== Other uses ==
- Clanging, a psychological phenomenon
- Klang Beer, a Cambodian beer
- Klang, a Pokémon
- Nordischer Klang, the largest festival of Nordic culture in Germany
- Rojak Klang
- We Are Klang, a comedy sketch group
