= Klaus Lindinger =

Austrian politician (born 1988)

Member of the National Council
- Incumbent
- Assumed office 9 November 2017
- Constituency: Hausruckviertel

Personal details
- Born: 22 October 1988 (age 37)
- Party: Austrian People's Party

Klaus Lindinger (born 22 October 1988) is an Austrian politician of the Austrian People's Party. Since 2017, he has been a member of the National Council. In 2021, he was elected mayor of Fischlham.
