= Ralph Schallmeiner =

Austrian politician (born 1976)

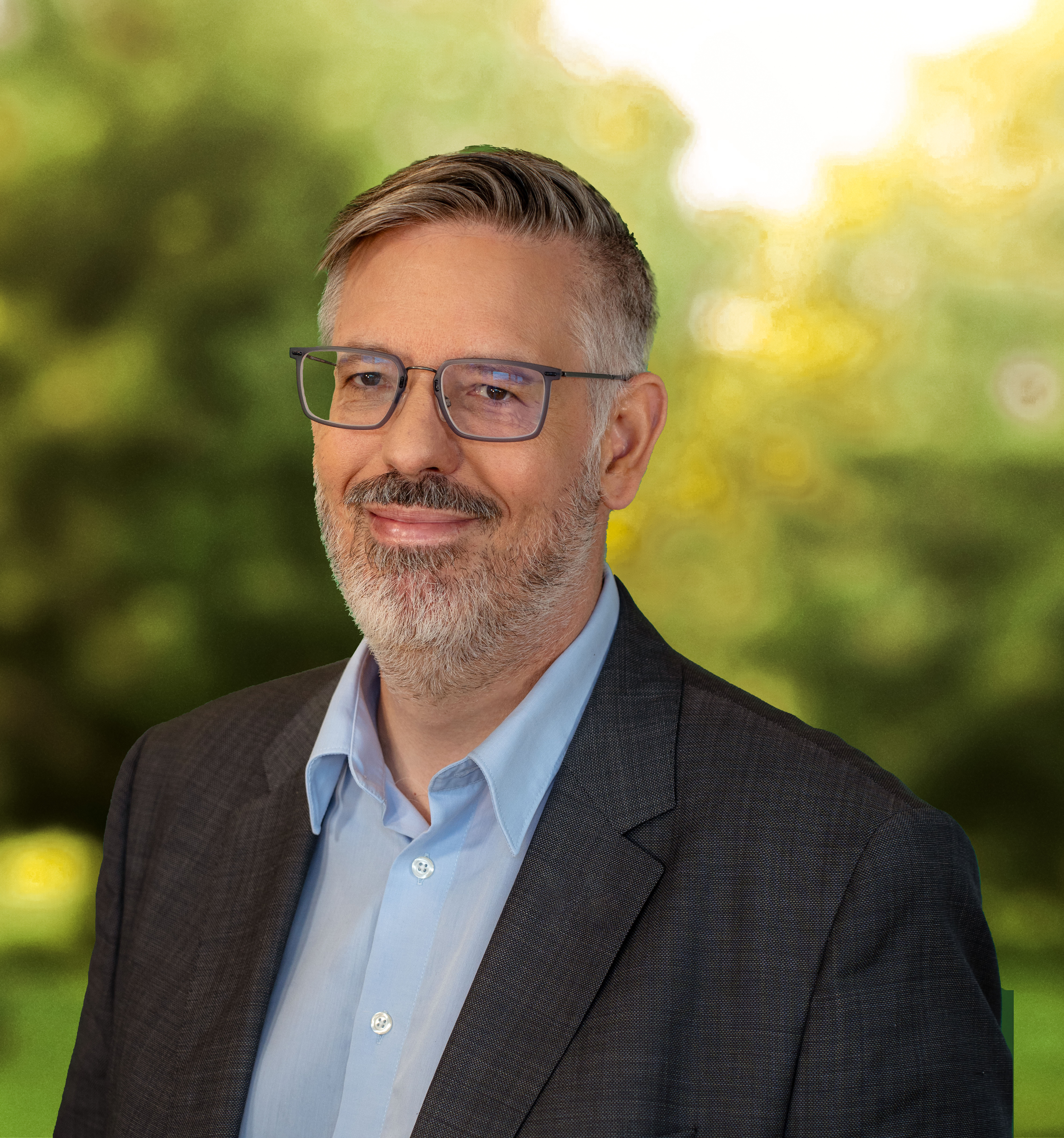
- Schallmeiner in 2024

Member of the National Council
- Incumbent
- Assumed office 23 October 2019
- Constituency: Hausruckviertel (2019–2024); Federal list (2024–present)

Personal details
- Born: 21 April 1976 (age 50) Wels, Austria
- Party: The Greens

Ralph Schallmeiner (born 21 April 1976) is an Austrian politician of The Greens. He has been a member of the National Council since 2019, and has served as deputy mayor of Thalheim bei Wels since 2021.
