= Klingler =

Klingler is a surname. Notable people with the surname include:

- Alfred Klingler (1912–?), German field handball player who competed in the 1936 Summer Olympics
- Baylee Klingler (born 1999), American softball player
- David Klingler (born 1969), American football player
- Gwen Klingler (born 1944), American politician
- Jimmy Klingler (born 1972), American football player
- Karl Klingler (1879–1971); German classical musician
- Werner Klingler (1903–1972), German film director and actor
- Eugene Klingler (1929-2025); German-American Minor League Baseball player for the San Francisco Seals, Korean War Veteran, and Daly City Fire Department Captain

== See also ==
- Klinger, surname
