= Cling =

Cling may refer to:

- "Cling", a song by Days of the New from their 1997 album Days of the New (album)
- Cling, a C++ interpreter; see CINT
- "Cling Cling", a song by Japanese girl group Perfume from the 2014 album Cosmic Explorer
- Cling film or cling wrap, alternate term for plastic wrap, used for sealing food items
- Clinging, the English translation of Upādāna, a word used in both Buddhism and Hinduism
- Static cling, a natural phenomenon when things stick together due to static electricity
- Cling and Clang, characters in the television series H.R. Pufnstuf

== See also ==
- Clinge, a town in the Dutch province of Zeeland
- Clinger (disambiguation)
- Clang (disambiguation)
