= Laurenz Pöttinger =

Austrian politician (born 1964)

Member of the National Council
- Incumbent
- Assumed office 2 July 2019
- Preceded by: Angelika Winzig
- Constituency: Hausruckviertel

Personal details
- Born: 25 September 1964 (age 61)
- Party: People's Party

Laurenz Pöttinger (born 25 September 1964) is an Austrian politician of the People's Party serving as a member of the National Council since 2019. From 2009 to 2021, he was a municipal councillor of Grieskirchen.
