= Klinger (surname) =

Klinger is a surname. Notable people with the surname include:

- Bertoldo Klinger (1884–1969), Brazilian military officer
- Bob Klinger (1908–1977), American baseball player
- Chad Klinger (active 1998–2013), Canadian country music artist
- Chajka Klinger (1917–1958), member of Jewish resistance of Będzin ghetto
- CJ Klinger (Carson Klinger), American professional pickleball player
- David Klinger (born 1958), American criminologist and former police officer
- Dietmar Klinger (born 1958), German football player
- Fausto Klinger (born 1953), Ecuadorian footballer
- Friedrich Maximilian von Klinger (1752–1831), German dramatist and novelist
- Georgette Klinger (1915–2004), Czech-born American businesswoman and cosmetologist
- Gustav Klinger (1876–1937), Russian Bolshevik politician
- Jerzy Klinger (1918–1976), Polish Orthodox priest, theologian and academic
- Joe Klinger (1902–1960), American baseball player
- José Klinger (born 2005), Ecuadorean footballer
- Josefina Klinger Zúñiga (born 1965), Colombian environmentalist
- Julie Michelle Klinger (born 1983) American geographer
- Julius Klinger (1876–1942), Austrian painter and illustrator
- Karen Klinger (born 1965), American rower
- Leslie S. Klinger (born 1946), American attorney and writer
- Margrit Klinger (born 1960), West German middle distance runner
- Marino Klinger (1936–1975), Colombian footballer
- Mario Klinger (born 1986), German footballer
- Martin Klinger (born 1980), Ecuadorian association football player
- Matt Klinger (born 1979), Canadian tennis player
- Max Klinger (1857–1920), German symbolist artist
- Michael Klinger (producer) (1921–1989), British film producer
- Michael Klinger (born 1980), Australian cricketer
- Miroslav Klinger (1893–1979), Czech gymnast
- Nir Klinger (born 1966), Israeli football player and manager
- Orly Klínger (born 1956), Ecuadorian footballer
- Paul Klinger (1907–1971), German actor
- Ron Klinger (born 1941), Australian bridge player and bridge writer
- Sebastian Klinger (born 1993), Swiss cinematographer and producer
- Stefan Klinger (born 1978), German ski mountaineer
- Tim Klinger (born 1984), German professional road bicycle racer
- Tony Klinger (born 1950), British filmmaker, author and media executive
- Umberto Klinger (1900–1971), Italian aviator, politician and entrepreneur
- William Klinger (1972−2015), Croatian historian
- Wolfgang Klinger (born 1959), Austrian politician

== See also ==
- Maxwell Klinger, a fictional character in M*A*S*H
- Jan Klingers (1929–1994), Dutch sprint canoeist
- Klinga (surname)
