= Clinger =

Clinger may refer to:

== People ==
- Charles Clinger (born 1976), American high jumper
- David Clinger (born 1977), American road racing cyclist
- Jeanette Clinger, American singer/vocalist
- William Clinger (1929–2021), American attorney and Republican politician
- William Clinger (computer scientist), Associate Professor in the College of Computer and Information Science at Northeastern University

== Other uses ==
- Clinger (film), a 2015 American comedy-horror film
- USAV CW3 Harold C. Clinger (LSV-2), a logistics support vessel in the United States Army

== See also ==
- Klinger (disambiguation)
- Cling (disambiguation)
- Clinge, a town in the Dutch province of Zeeland
- Clinger–Booth House, an 1894 house in Orem, Utah, U.S.
- Clinger–Cohen Act, formally the Information Technology Management Reform Act of 1996 (ITMRA)
