= Fischlham =

- Municipality
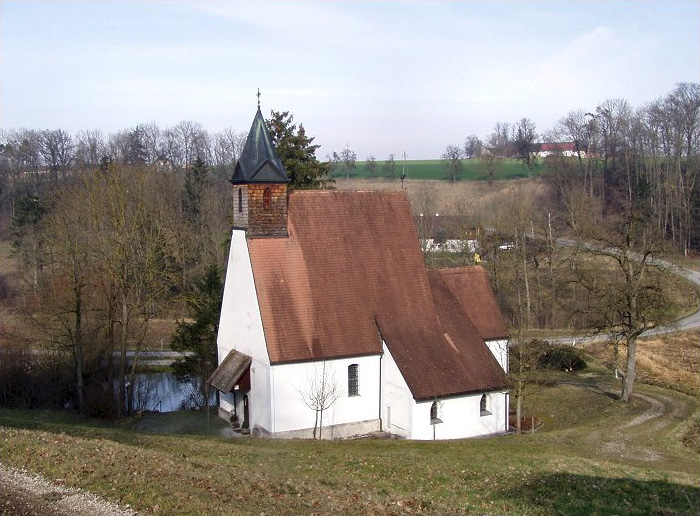

- Coat of arms

- Location within Austria
- Coordinates: 48°05′19″N 13°57′04″E
- Country: Austria
- State: Upper Austria
- District: Wels-Land

Government
  - Mayor: Klaus Lindinger (ÖVP)

Area
  - Total: 15.64 km^{2} (6.04 sq mi)
- Elevation: 353 m (1,158 ft)

Population (2018-01-01)
  - Total: 1,328
  - Density: 84.91/km^{2} (219.9/sq mi)
- Time zone: UTC+1 (CET)
  - Summer (DST): UTC+2 (CEST)
- Postal code: 4652
- Area code: 0 72 41
- Vehicle registration: WL
- Website: www.fischlham.ooe.gv.at

Fischlham is a municipality in the district of Wels-Land in the Austrian state of Upper Austria.

== Geography ==
Fischlham lies in the Hausruckviertel. About 19 percent of the municipality is forest, and 69 percent is farmland.

== Personalities ==
It is notable for being the location of Adolf Hitler's first two years of formal schooling, from 1895 to 1897.

=== Sons and daughters of the location ===
- Paula Hitler (1896-1960), the only full sister of Adolf Hitler who survived to adulthood
