= Gerhard Kaniak =

Austrian politician (born 1979)

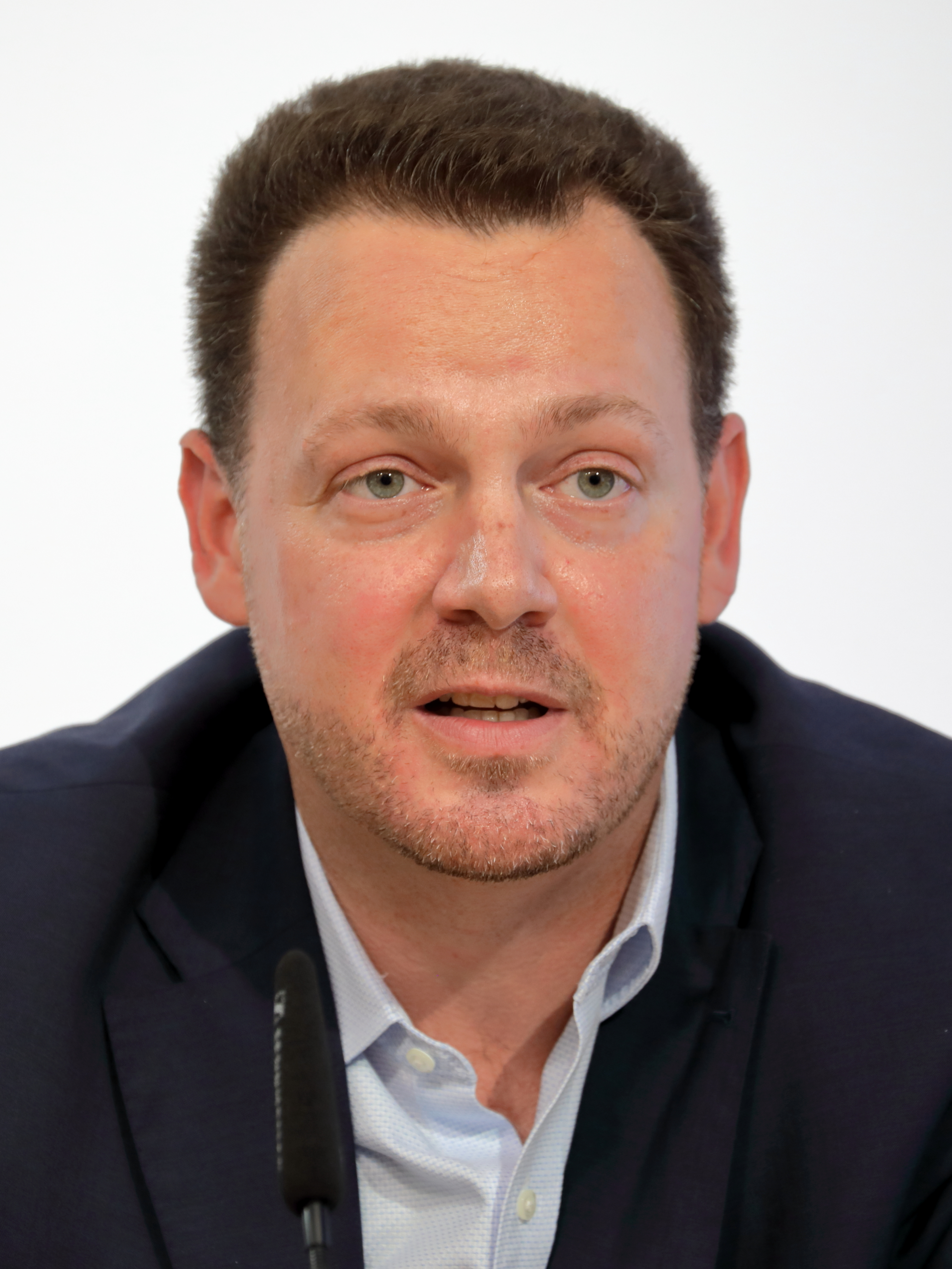
- Kaniak in 2020

Member of the National Council
- Incumbent
- Assumed office 9 November 2017
- Constituency: Hausruckviertel

Personal details
- Born: 6 March 1979 (age 47)
- Party: Freedom Party

Gerhard Kaniak (born 6 March 1979) is an Austrian politician of the Freedom Party. He has been a member of the National Council since 2017, and a municipal councillor of Schörfling am Attersee since 2015.
