= Hausruckviertel (National Council electoral district) =

Parliamentary electoral district in Austria

- Electoral District for the National Council
- Location of Hausruckviertel within Austria
- District: List: Eferding; Grieskirchen; Vöcklabruck; Wels City; Wels Rural
- State: Upper Austria
- Population: 383,885 (2024)
- Electorate: 273,379 (2019)
- Area: 2,427 km^{2} (2023)

Current Electoral District
- Created: 1994
- Seats: 8 (1994–present)
- Members: List: Gerhard Kaniak (FPÖ); Klaus Lindinger (ÖVP); Laurenz Pöttinger (ÖVP); Ralph Schallmeiner (GRÜNE); Petra Wimmer (SPÖ)

Hausruckviertel, also known as Electoral District 4C (German: Wahlkreis 4C), is one of the 39 multi-member regional electoral districts of the National Council, the lower house of the Austrian Parliament, the national legislature of Austria. The electoral district was created in 1992 when electoral regulations were amended to add regional electoral districts to the existing state-wide electoral districts and came into being at the following legislative election in 1994. It consists of the city of Wels and the districts of Eferding, Grieskirchen, Vöcklabruck and Wels Rural in the state of Upper Austria. The electoral district currently elects eight of the 183 members of the National Council using the open party-list proportional representation electoral system. At the 2019 legislative election the constituency had 273,379 registered electors.

== History ==
Hausruckviertel was one 43 regional electoral districts (regionalwahlkreise) established by the "National Council Electoral Regulations 1992" (Nationalrats-Wahlordnung 1992) passed by the National Council in 1992. It consisted of the city of Wels and the districts of Eferding, Grieskirchen, Vöcklabruck and Wels Rural in the state of Upper Austria. The district was initially allocated eight seats in May 1993.

== Electoral system ==
Hausruckviertel currently elects eight of the 183 members of the National Council using the open party-list proportional representation electoral system. The allocation of seats is carried out in three stages. In the first stage, seats are allocated to parties (lists) at the regional level using a state-wide Hare quota (wahlzahl) (valid votes in the state divided by the number of seats in the state). In the second stage, seats are allocated to parties at the state/provincial level using the state-wide Hare quota (any seats won by the party at the regional stage are subtracted from the party's state seats). In the third and final stage, seats are allocated to parties at the federal/national level using the D'Hondt method (any seats won by the party at the regional and state stages are subtracted from the party's federal seats). Only parties that reach the 4% national threshold, or have won a seat at the regional stage, compete for seats at the state and federal stages.

Electors may cast one preferential vote for individual candidates at the regional, state and federal levels. Split-ticket voting (panachage), or voting for more than one candidate at each level, is not permitted and will result in the ballot paper being invalidated. At the regional level, candidates must receive preferential votes amounting to at least 14% of the valid votes cast for their party to over-ride the order of the party list (10% and 7% respectively for the state and federal levels). Prior to April 2013 electors could not cast preferential votes at the federal level and the thresholds candidates needed to over-ride the party list order were higher at the regional level (half the Hare quota or 1/6 of the party votes) and state level (Hare quota).

== Election results ==
=== Summary ===
| Election | Communists KPÖ+ / KPÖ | | | Social Democrats SPÖ | | | Greens GRÜNE | | | NEOS NEOS / LiF | | | People's ÖVP | | | Freedom FPÖ | | |
| Election | Votes | % | Seats | Votes | % | Seats | Votes | % | Seats | Votes | % | Seats | Votes | % | Seats | Votes | % | Seats |
|---|---|---|---|---|---|---|---|---|---|---|---|---|---|---|---|---|---|---|
| 2019 | 1,009 | 0.48% | 0 | 43,537 | 20.76% | 1 | 27,377 | 13.06% | 1 | 15,508 | 7.40% | 0 | 77,480 | 36.95% | 2 | 40,697 | 19.41% | 1 |
| 2017 | 1,073 | 0.49% | 0 | 56,535 | 25.58% | 2 | 7,752 | 3.51% | 0 | 10,521 | 4.76% | 0 | 69,393 | 31.40% | 2 | 64,579 | 29.22% | 2 |
| 2013 | 1,261 | 0.60% | 0 | 53,584 | 25.69% | 2 | 24,013 | 11.51% | 0 | 6,722 | 3.22% | 0 | 52,181 | 25.02% | 1 | 50,470 | 24.20% | 1 |
| 2008 | 1,215 | 0.57% | 0 | 61,132 | 28.60% | 2 | 19,743 | 9.24% | 0 | 2,535 | 1.19% | 0 | 56,972 | 26.65% | 2 | 45,644 | 21.35% | 1 |
| 2006 | 1,544 | 0.76% | 0 | 70,751 | 34.66% | 2 | 20,046 | 9.82% | 0 | | | | 72,193 | 35.36% | 2 | 28,218 | 13.82% | 1 |
| 2002 | 983 | 0.47% | 0 | 74,102 | 35.66% | 2 | 17,368 | 8.36% | 0 | 1,804 | 0.87% | 0 | 89,752 | 43.19% | 3 | 23,787 | 11.45% | 0 |
| 1999 | 618 | 0.31% | 0 | 61,564 | 31.12% | 2 | 14,583 | 7.37% | 0 | 4,997 | 2.53% | 0 | 55,911 | 28.26% | 2 | 57,756 | 29.19% | 2 |
| 1995 | 434 | 0.21% | 0 | 74,058 | 36.39% | 2 | 10,107 | 4.97% | 0 | 8,706 | 4.28% | 0 | 59,874 | 29.42% | 2 | 47,922 | 23.55% | 1 |
| 1994 | 325 | 0.17% | 0 | 64,674 | 33.26% | 2 | 14,383 | 7.40% | 0 | 8,963 | 4.61% | 0 | 55,514 | 28.55% | 2 | 47,585 | 24.47% | 1 |

=== Detailed ===
==== 2010s ====
===== 2019 =====
Results of the 2019 legislative election held on 29 September 2019:

| Party | | Votes per district | | | | | | Total votes | % | Seats |
| Party | | Efer- ding | Gries- kirchen | Vöckla- bruck | Wels City | Wels Rural | Voting card | Total votes | % | Seats |
|---|---|---|---|---|---|---|---|---|---|---|
| Austrian People's Party | ÖVP | 7,501 | 16,571 | 30,368 | 7,339 | 15,556 | 145 | 77,480 | 36.95% | 2 |
| Social Democratic Party of Austria | SPÖ | 4,454 | 6,712 | 15,948 | 7,651 | 8,704 | 68 | 43,537 | 20.76% | 1 |
| Freedom Party of Austria | FPÖ | 4,030 | 8,057 | 14,207 | 5,322 | 9,025 | 56 | 40,697 | 19.41% | 1 |
| The Greens – The Green Alternative | GRÜNE | 2,533 | 4,854 | 10,786 | 3,853 | 5,104 | 247 | 27,377 | 13.06% | 1 |
| NEOS – The New Austria and Liberal Forum | NEOS | 1,494 | 2,694 | 5,696 | 2,020 | 3,502 | 102 | 15,508 | 7.40% | 0 |
| JETZT | JETZT | 274 | 453 | 1,269 | 412 | 610 | 26 | 3,044 | 1.45% | 0 |
| KPÖ Plus | KPÖ+ | 86 | 146 | 421 | 171 | 180 | 5 | 1,009 | 0.48% | 0 |
| Der Wandel | WANDL | 84 | 173 | 399 | 129 | 192 | 5 | 982 | 0.47% | 0 |
| Socialist Left Party | SLP | 7 | 10 | 23 | 6 | 12 | 0 | 58 | 0.03% | 0 |
| Valid Votes | | 20,463 | 39,670 | 79,117 | 26,903 | 42,885 | 654 | 209,692 | 100.00% | 5 |
| Rejected Votes | | 445 | 710 | 1,362 | 369 | 616 | 8 | 3,510 | 1.65% | |
| Total Polled | | 20,908 | 40,380 | 80,479 | 27,272 | 43,501 | 662 | 213,202 | 77.99% | |
| Registered Electors | | 25,869 | 50,592 | 102,974 | 39,157 | 54,787 | | 273,379 | | |
| Turnout | | 80.82% | 79.81% | 78.15% | 69.65% | 79.40% | | 77.99% | | |

The following candidates were elected:

- Party mandates - Gerhard Kaniak (FPÖ), 1,566 votes; Klaus Lindinger (ÖVP), 5,779 votes; Laurenz Pöttinger (ÖVP), 4,147 votes; Ralph Schallmeiner (GRÜNE), 948 votes; and Petra Wimmer (SPÖ), 3,379 votes.

===== 2017 =====
Results of the 2017 legislative election held on 15 October 2017:

| Party | | Votes per district | | | | | | Total votes | % | Seats |
| Party | | Efer- ding | Gries- kirchen | Vöckla- bruck | Wels City | Wels Rural | Voting card | Total votes | % | Seats |
|---|---|---|---|---|---|---|---|---|---|---|
| Austrian People's Party | ÖVP | 6,744 | 15,397 | 26,941 | 6,500 | 13,637 | 174 | 69,393 | 31.40% | 2 |
| Freedom Party of Austria | FPÖ | 6,385 | 12,292 | 23,236 | 8,698 | 13,835 | 133 | 64,579 | 29.22% | 2 |
| Social Democratic Party of Austria | SPÖ | 5,761 | 8,833 | 20,812 | 9,881 | 11,017 | 231 | 56,535 | 25.58% | 2 |
| NEOS – The New Austria and Liberal Forum | NEOS | 974 | 1,744 | 3,858 | 1,423 | 2,416 | 106 | 10,521 | 4.76% | 0 |
| Peter Pilz List | PILZ | 657 | 1,227 | 3,363 | 1,147 | 1,473 | 79 | 7,946 | 3.60% | 0 |
| The Greens – The Green Alternative | GRÜNE | 715 | 1,389 | 3,070 | 1,125 | 1,353 | 100 | 7,752 | 3.51% | 0 |
| My Vote Counts! | GILT | 215 | 385 | 788 | 242 | 450 | 13 | 2,093 | 0.95% | 0 |
| Communist Party of Austria | KPÖ | 80 | 161 | 425 | 197 | 191 | 19 | 1,073 | 0.49% | 0 |
| The Whites | WEIßE | 48 | 120 | 547 | 36 | 103 | 2 | 856 | 0.39% | 0 |
| Free List Austria | FLÖ | 27 | 38 | 84 | 24 | 45 | 2 | 220 | 0.10% | 0 |
| Socialist Left Party | SLP | 3 | 6 | 12 | 6 | 6 | 0 | 33 | 0.01% | 0 |
| Valid Votes | | 21,609 | 41,592 | 83,136 | 29,279 | 44,526 | 859 | 221,001 | 100.00% | 6 |
| Rejected Votes | | 270 | 610 | 1,060 | 293 | 473 | 7 | 2,713 | 1.21% | |
| Total Polled | | 21,879 | 42,202 | 84,196 | 29,572 | 44,999 | 866 | 223,714 | 82.14% | |
| Registered Electors | | 25,789 | 50,411 | 102,530 | 39,623 | 54,005 | | 272,358 | | |
| Turnout | | 84.84% | 83.72% | 82.12% | 74.63% | 83.32% | | 82.14% | | |

The following candidates were elected:

- Party mandates - Gerhard Kaniak (FPÖ), 1,155 votes; Wolfgang Klinger (FPÖ), 3,860 votes; Klaus Lindinger (ÖVP), 4,091 votes; Doris Margreiter (SPÖ), 2,870 votes; Petra Wimmer (SPÖ), 2,956 votes; and Angelika Winzig (ÖVP), 4,875 votes.

Substitutions:

- Wolfgang Klinger (FPÖ) resigned on 22 May 2019 and was replaced by Roman Haider (FPÖ) on 27 May 2019.
- Roman Haider (FPÖ) resigned on 1 July 2019 and was replaced by Sandra Wohlschlager (FPÖ) on 2 July 2019.
- Angelika Winzig (ÖVP) resigned on 1 July 2019 and was replaced by Laurenz Pöttinger (ÖVP) on 2 July 2019.

===== 2013 =====
Results of the 2013 legislative election held on 29 September 2013:

| Party | | Votes per district | | | | | | Total votes | % | Seats |
| Party | | Efer- ding | Gries- kirchen | Vöckla- bruck | Wels City | Wels Rural | Voting card | Total votes | % | Seats |
|---|---|---|---|---|---|---|---|---|---|---|
| Social Democratic Party of Austria | SPÖ | 5,378 | 8,273 | 19,881 | 9,434 | 10,525 | 93 | 53,584 | 25.69% | 2 |
| Austrian People's Party | ÖVP | 5,380 | 12,254 | 20,195 | 4,171 | 10,022 | 159 | 52,181 | 25.02% | 1 |
| Freedom Party of Austria | FPÖ | 4,711 | 9,246 | 18,032 | 7,857 | 10,543 | 81 | 50,470 | 24.20% | 1 |
| The Greens – The Green Alternative | GRÜNE | 2,320 | 4,156 | 9,170 | 3,651 | 4,510 | 206 | 24,013 | 11.51% | 0 |
| Team Stronach | FRANK | 931 | 1,790 | 3,812 | 1,330 | 2,290 | 15 | 10,168 | 4.87% | 0 |
| Alliance for the Future of Austria | BZÖ | 681 | 1,384 | 2,737 | 963 | 1,547 | 34 | 7,346 | 3.52% | 0 |
| NEOS – The New Austria | NEOS | 527 | 1,090 | 2,587 | 1,066 | 1,385 | 67 | 6,722 | 3.22% | 0 |
| Pirate Party of Austria | PIRAT | 142 | 286 | 697 | 221 | 378 | 15 | 1,739 | 0.83% | 0 |
| Communist Party of Austria | KPÖ | 113 | 214 | 466 | 230 | 226 | 12 | 1,261 | 0.60% | 0 |
| Christian Party of Austria | CPÖ | 58 | 156 | 353 | 68 | 111 | 0 | 746 | 0.36% | 0 |
| Der Wandel | WANDL | 31 | 75 | 119 | 48 | 77 | 2 | 352 | 0.17% | 0 |
| Valid Votes | | 20,272 | 38,924 | 78,049 | 29,039 | 41,614 | 684 | 208,582 | 100.00% | 4 |
| Rejected Votes | | 511 | 1,274 | 2,246 | 451 | 896 | 16 | 5,394 | 2.52% | |
| Total Polled | | 20,783 | 40,198 | 80,295 | 29,490 | 42,510 | 700 | 213,976 | 79.05% | |
| Registered Electors | | 25,480 | 49,884 | 101,803 | 40,671 | 52,848 | | 270,686 | | |
| Turnout | | 81.57% | 80.58% | 78.87% | 72.51% | 80.44% | | 79.05% | | |

The following candidates were elected:

- Party mandates - Maria Fekter (ÖVP), 4,951 votes; Heinz-Peter Hackl (FPÖ), 3,344 votes; Daniela Holzinger (SPÖ), 4,449 votes; and Franz Kirchgatterer (SPÖ), 3,175 votes.

Substitutions:

- Heinz-Peter Hackl (FPÖ) resigned on 28 June 2016 and was replaced by Wolfgang Klinger (FPÖ) on 29 June 2016.

==== 2000s ====
===== 2008 =====
Results of the 2008 legislative election held on 28 September 2008:

| Party | | Votes per district | | | | | | Total votes | % | Seats |
| Party | | Efer- ding | Gries- kirchen | Vöckla- bruck | Wels City | Wels Rural | Voting card | Total votes | % | Seats |
|---|---|---|---|---|---|---|---|---|---|---|
| Social Democratic Party of Austria | SPÖ | 6,201 | 9,351 | 21,941 | 10,846 | 12,380 | 413 | 61,132 | 28.60% | 2 |
| Austrian People's Party | ÖVP | 5,765 | 13,400 | 21,402 | 5,163 | 10,663 | 579 | 56,972 | 26.65% | 2 |
| Freedom Party of Austria | FPÖ | 4,115 | 7,785 | 17,941 | 6,480 | 9,039 | 284 | 45,644 | 21.35% | 1 |
| Alliance for the Future of Austria | BZÖ | 1,795 | 3,475 | 7,344 | 3,135 | 4,401 | 174 | 20,324 | 9.51% | 0 |
| The Greens – The Green Alternative | GRÜNE | 1,767 | 3,299 | 7,264 | 3,325 | 3,561 | 527 | 19,743 | 9.24% | 0 |
| Liberal Forum | LiF | 198 | 328 | 922 | 526 | 476 | 85 | 2,535 | 1.19% | 0 |
| Fritz Dinkhauser List – Citizens' Forum Tyrol | FRITZ | 181 | 418 | 774 | 235 | 466 | 26 | 2,100 | 0.98% | 0 |
| Independent Citizens' Initiative Save Austria | RETTÖ | 201 | 328 | 932 | 183 | 373 | 17 | 2,034 | 0.95% | 0 |
| The Christians | DC | 141 | 502 | 848 | 189 | 313 | 16 | 2,009 | 0.94% | 0 |
| Communist Party of Austria | KPÖ | 93 | 180 | 510 | 218 | 202 | 12 | 1,215 | 0.57% | 0 |
| Left | LINKE | 11 | 11 | 22 | 13 | 15 | 1 | 73 | 0.03% | 0 |
| Valid Votes | | 20,468 | 39,077 | 79,900 | 30,313 | 41,889 | 2,134 | 213,781 | 100.00% | 5 |
| Rejected Votes | | 563 | 1,533 | 2,592 | 543 | 1,054 | 36 | 6,321 | 2.87% | |
| Total Polled | | 21,031 | 40,610 | 82,492 | 30,856 | 42,943 | 2,170 | 220,102 | 82.62% | |
| Registered Electors | | 24,923 | 49,199 | 100,100 | 40,994 | 51,175 | | 266,391 | | |
| Turnout | | 84.38% | 82.54% | 82.41% | 75.27% | 83.91% | | 82.62% | | |

The following candidates were elected:

- Party mandates - Jakob Auer (ÖVP), 2,908 votes; Maria Fekter (ÖVP), 4,820 votes; Manfred Haimbuchner (FPÖ), 3,284 votes; Franz Kirchgatterer (SPÖ), 3,622 votes; and Rosemarie Schönpass (SPÖ), 2,719 votes.

Substitutions:

- Maria Fekter (ÖVP) resigned on 2 December 2008 and was replaced by Wolfgang Großruck (ÖVP) on 3 December 2008.
- Manfred Haimbuchner (FPÖ) resigned on 21 October 2009 and was replaced by Heinz-Peter Hackl (FPÖ) on 22 October 2009.

===== 2006 =====
Results of the 2006 legislative election held on 1 October 2006:

| Party | | Votes per district | | | | | | Total votes | % | Seats |
| Party | | Efer- ding | Gries- kirchen | Vöckla- bruck | Wels City | Wels Rural | Voting card | Total votes | % | Seats |
|---|---|---|---|---|---|---|---|---|---|---|
| Austrian People's Party | ÖVP | 6,856 | 15,990 | 26,173 | 6,693 | 13,113 | 3,368 | 72,193 | 35.36% | 2 |
| Social Democratic Party of Austria | SPÖ | 6,705 | 10,442 | 25,356 | 12,403 | 13,465 | 2,380 | 70,751 | 34.66% | 2 |
| Freedom Party of Austria | FPÖ | 2,634 | 4,995 | 9,680 | 4,338 | 5,731 | 840 | 28,218 | 13.82% | 1 |
| The Greens – The Green Alternative | GRÜNE | 1,582 | 3,035 | 6,813 | 3,271 | 3,359 | 1,986 | 20,046 | 9.82% | 0 |
| Hans-Peter Martin's List | MATIN | 485 | 1,036 | 2,221 | 832 | 1,042 | 197 | 5,813 | 2.85% | 0 |
| Alliance for the Future of Austria | BZÖ | 394 | 885 | 1,938 | 1,067 | 1,109 | 179 | 5,572 | 2.73% | 0 |
| Communist Party of Austria | KPÖ | 124 | 249 | 600 | 242 | 244 | 85 | 1,544 | 0.76% | 0 |
| Valid Votes | | 18,780 | 36,632 | 72,781 | 28,846 | 38,063 | 9,035 | 204,137 | 100.00% | 5 |
| Rejected Votes | | 427 | 1,011 | 1,982 | 432 | 742 | 146 | 4,740 | 2.27% | |
| Total Polled | | 19,207 | 37,643 | 74,763 | 29,278 | 38,805 | 9,181 | 208,877 | 81.85% | |
| Registered Electors | | 23,728 | 47,193 | 95,783 | 40,223 | 48,282 | | 255,209 | | |
| Turnout | | 80.95% | 79.76% | 78.05% | 72.79% | 80.37% | | 81.85% | | |

The following candidates were elected:

- Party mandates - Jakob Auer (ÖVP), 3,927 votes; Wolfgang Großruck (ÖVP), 2,739 votes; Manfred Haimbuchner (FPÖ), 1,913 votes; Franz Kirchgatterer (SPÖ), 4,333 votes; and Rosemarie Schönpass (SPÖ), 3,705 votes. (Note: ÖVP: 1st placed candidate Maria Fekter was elected in Upper Austria.)

===== 2002 =====
Results of the 2002 legislative election held on 24 November 2002:

| Party | | Votes per district | | | | | | Total votes | % | Seats |
| Party | | Efer- ding | Gries- kirchen | Vöckla- bruck | Wels City | Wels Rural | Voting card | Total votes | % | Seats |
|---|---|---|---|---|---|---|---|---|---|---|
| Austrian People's Party | ÖVP | 8,435 | 19,745 | 32,861 | 9,685 | 16,113 | 2,913 | 89,752 | 43.19% | 3 |
| Social Democratic Party of Austria | SPÖ | 7,174 | 10,922 | 26,834 | 13,349 | 14,226 | 1,597 | 74,102 | 35.66% | 2 |
| Freedom Party of Austria | FPÖ | 2,077 | 4,474 | 8,258 | 3,787 | 4,688 | 503 | 23,787 | 11.45% | 0 |
| The Greens – The Green Alternative | GRÜNE | 1,302 | 2,383 | 6,027 | 3,037 | 2,853 | 1,766 | 17,368 | 8.36% | 0 |
| Liberal Forum | LiF | 131 | 254 | 662 | 349 | 311 | 97 | 1,804 | 0.87% | 0 |
| Communist Party of Austria | KPÖ | 81 | 176 | 371 | 177 | 161 | 17 | 983 | 0.47% | 0 |
| Valid Votes | | 19,200 | 37,954 | 75,013 | 30,384 | 38,352 | 6,893 | 207,796 | 100.00% | 5 |
| Rejected Votes | | 332 | 809 | 1,602 | 334 | 607 | 59 | 3,743 | 1.77% | |
| Total Polled | | 19,532 | 38,763 | 76,615 | 30,718 | 38,959 | 6,952 | 211,539 | 86.60% | |
| Registered Electors | | 22,574 | 45,532 | 91,660 | 38,829 | 45,663 | | 244,258 | | |
| Turnout | | 86.52% | 85.13% | 83.59% | 79.11% | 85.32% | | 86.60% | | |

The following candidates were elected:

- Party mandates - Jakob Auer (ÖVP), 3,291 votes; Maria Fekter (ÖVP), 5,104 votes; Wolfgang Großruck (ÖVP), 3,054 votes; Georg Oberhaidinger (SPÖ), 4,380 votes; and Rosemarie Schönpass (SPÖ), 3,064 votes.

==== 1990s ====
===== 1999 =====
Results of the 1999 legislative election held on 3 October 1999:

| Party | | Votes per district | | | | | | Total votes | % | Seats |
| Party | | Efer- ding | Gries- kirchen | Vöckla- bruck | Wels City | Wels Rural | Voting card | Total votes | % | Seats |
|---|---|---|---|---|---|---|---|---|---|---|
| Social Democratic Party of Austria | SPÖ | 5,929 | 9,197 | 22,382 | 10,439 | 11,680 | 1,937 | 61,564 | 31.12% | 2 |
| Freedom Party of Austria | FPÖ | 4,901 | 10,494 | 19,979 | 9,723 | 11,063 | 1,596 | 57,756 | 29.19% | 2 |
| Austrian People's Party | ÖVP | 5,803 | 13,129 | 20,463 | 4,783 | 9,640 | 2,093 | 55,911 | 28.26% | 2 |
| The Greens – The Green Alternative | GRÜNE | 1,067 | 2,193 | 5,314 | 2,393 | 2,450 | 1,166 | 14,583 | 7.37% | 0 |
| Liberal Forum | LiF | 313 | 569 | 1,594 | 1,034 | 804 | 683 | 4,997 | 2.53% | 0 |
| The Independents | DU | 114 | 208 | 591 | 274 | 307 | 44 | 1,538 | 0.78% | 0 |
| No to NATO and EU – Neutral Austria Citizens' Initiative | NEIN | 73 | 187 | 398 | 78 | 116 | 19 | 871 | 0.44% | 0 |
| Communist Party of Austria | KPÖ | 48 | 83 | 252 | 96 | 110 | 29 | 618 | 0.31% | 0 |
| Valid Votes | | 18,248 | 36,060 | 70,973 | 28,820 | 36,170 | 7,567 | 197,838 | 100.00% | 6 |
| Rejected Votes | | 305 | 753 | 1,489 | 319 | 562 | 65 | 3,493 | 1.73% | |
| Total Polled | | 18,553 | 36,813 | 72,462 | 29,139 | 36,732 | 7,632 | 201,331 | 84.09% | |
| Registered Electors | | 22,141 | 44,575 | 89,767 | 38,510 | 44,433 | | 239,426 | | |
| Turnout | | 83.79% | 82.59% | 80.72% | 75.67% | 82.67% | | 84.09% | | |

The following candidates were elected:

- Party mandates - Jakob Auer (ÖVP), 3,034 votes; Anna Aumayr (FPÖ), 2,409 votes; Wolfgang Großruck (ÖVP), 3,050 votes; Maximilian Hofmann (FPÖ), 2,239 votes; Peter Keppelmüller (SPÖ), 3,892 votes; and Georg Oberhaidinger (SPÖ), 3,542 votes.

===== 1995 =====
Results of the 1995 legislative election held on 17 December 1995:

| Party | | Votes per district | | | | | | Total votes | % | Seats |
| Party | | Efer- ding | Gries- kirchen | Vöckla- bruck | Wels City | Wels Rural | Voting card | Total votes | % | Seats |
|---|---|---|---|---|---|---|---|---|---|---|
| Social Democratic Party of Austria | SPÖ | 7,073 | 10,869 | 26,849 | 13,784 | 13,972 | 1,511 | 74,058 | 36.39% | 2 |
| Austrian People's Party | ÖVP | 6,158 | 14,157 | 21,955 | 5,653 | 10,214 | 1,737 | 59,874 | 29.42% | 2 |
| Freedom Party of Austria | FPÖ | 4,010 | 8,755 | 17,051 | 8,084 | 9,154 | 868 | 47,922 | 23.55% | 1 |
| The Greens – The Green Alternative | GRÜNE | 704 | 1,578 | 3,602 | 1,606 | 1,604 | 1,013 | 10,107 | 4.97% | 0 |
| Liberal Forum | LiF | 547 | 1,049 | 2,913 | 1,909 | 1,438 | 850 | 8,706 | 4.28% | 0 |
| No – Civic Action Group; Against the Sale of Austria | NEIN | 196 | 409 | 1,152 | 241 | 364 | 57 | 2,419 | 1.19% | 0 |
| Communist Party of Austria | KPÖ | 28 | 58 | 158 | 96 | 84 | 10 | 434 | 0.21% | 0 |
| Valid Votes | | 18,716 | 36,875 | 73,680 | 31,373 | 36,830 | 6,046 | 203,520 | 100.00% | 5 |
| Rejected Votes | | 429 | 1,011 | 1,901 | 557 | 719 | 74 | 4,691 | 2.25% | |
| Total Polled | | 19,145 | 37,886 | 75,581 | 31,930 | 37,549 | 6,120 | 208,211 | 88.58% | |
| Registered Electors | | 21,620 | 43,619 | 88,114 | 38,675 | 43,039 | | 235,067 | | |
| Turnout | | 88.55% | 86.86% | 85.78% | 82.56% | 87.24% | | 88.58% | | |

The following candidates were elected:

- Party mandates - Jakob Auer (ÖVP), 2,288 votes; Anna Aumayr (FPÖ), 2,131 votes; Maria Fekter (ÖVP), 3,166 votes; Peter Keppelmüller (SPÖ), 6,706 votes; and Georg Oberhaidinger (SPÖ), 4,521 votes.

===== 1994 =====
Results of the 1994 legislative election held on 9 October 1994:

| Party | | Votes per district | | | | | | Total votes | % | Seats |
| Party | | Efer- ding | Gries- kirchen | Vöckla- bruck | Wels City | Wels Rural | Voting card | Total votes | % | Seats |
|---|---|---|---|---|---|---|---|---|---|---|
| Social Democratic Party of Austria | SPÖ | 6,314 | 9,434 | 23,653 | 11,566 | 12,094 | 1,613 | 64,674 | 33.26% | 2 |
| Austrian People's Party | ÖVP | 5,865 | 13,455 | 20,627 | 4,824 | 9,132 | 1,611 | 55,514 | 28.55% | 2 |
| Freedom Party of Austria | FPÖ | 4,169 | 8,969 | 16,217 | 7,933 | 9,085 | 1,212 | 47,585 | 24.47% | 1 |
| The Greens – The Green Alternative | GRÜNE | 1,007 | 2,229 | 5,214 | 2,345 | 2,380 | 1,208 | 14,383 | 7.40% | 0 |
| Liberal Forum | LiF | 574 | 1,145 | 2,948 | 1,997 | 1,512 | 787 | 8,963 | 4.61% | 0 |
| No – Civic Action Group; Against the Sale of Austria | NEIN | 117 | 235 | 698 | 207 | 303 | 44 | 1,604 | 0.82% | 0 |
| Christian Voters Community | CWG | 39 | 184 | 322 | 113 | 196 | 37 | 891 | 0.46% | 0 |
| Communist Party of Austria | KPÖ | 21 | 47 | 121 | 65 | 62 | 9 | 325 | 0.17% | 0 |
| Natural Law Party | ÖNP | 14 | 63 | 110 | 51 | 44 | 7 | 289 | 0.15% | 0 |
| United Greens Austria – List Adi Pinter | VGÖ | 27 | 41 | 80 | 41 | 55 | 5 | 249 | 0.13% | 0 |
| Valid Votes | | 18,147 | 35,802 | 69,990 | 29,142 | 34,863 | 6,533 | 194,477 | 100.00% | 5 |
| Rejected Votes | | 383 | 875 | 1,817 | 441 | 671 | 96 | 4,283 | 2.15% | |
| Total Polled | | 18,530 | 36,677 | 71,807 | 29,583 | 35,534 | 6,629 | 198,760 | 84.70% | |
| Registered Electors | | 21,530 | 43,662 | 88,009 | 38,716 | 42,745 | | 234,662 | | |
| Turnout | | 86.07% | 84.00% | 81.59% | 76.41% | 83.13% | | 84.70% | | |

The following candidates were elected:

- Party mandates -Jakob Auer (ÖVP), 2,615 votes; Anna Aumayr (FPÖ), 3,566 votes; Maria Fekter (ÖVP), 3,507 votes; Peter Keppelmüller (SPÖ), 5,466 votes; and Georg Oberhaidinger (SPÖ), 4,361 votes.

Substitutions:

- Maria Fekter (ÖVP) was reassigned to the Upper Austria seat vacated by Hermann Kraft and was replaced by Wolfgang Großruck (ÖVP) in Hausruckviertel on 21 February 1995.
