= Petra Wimmer =

Austrian politician (born 1965)

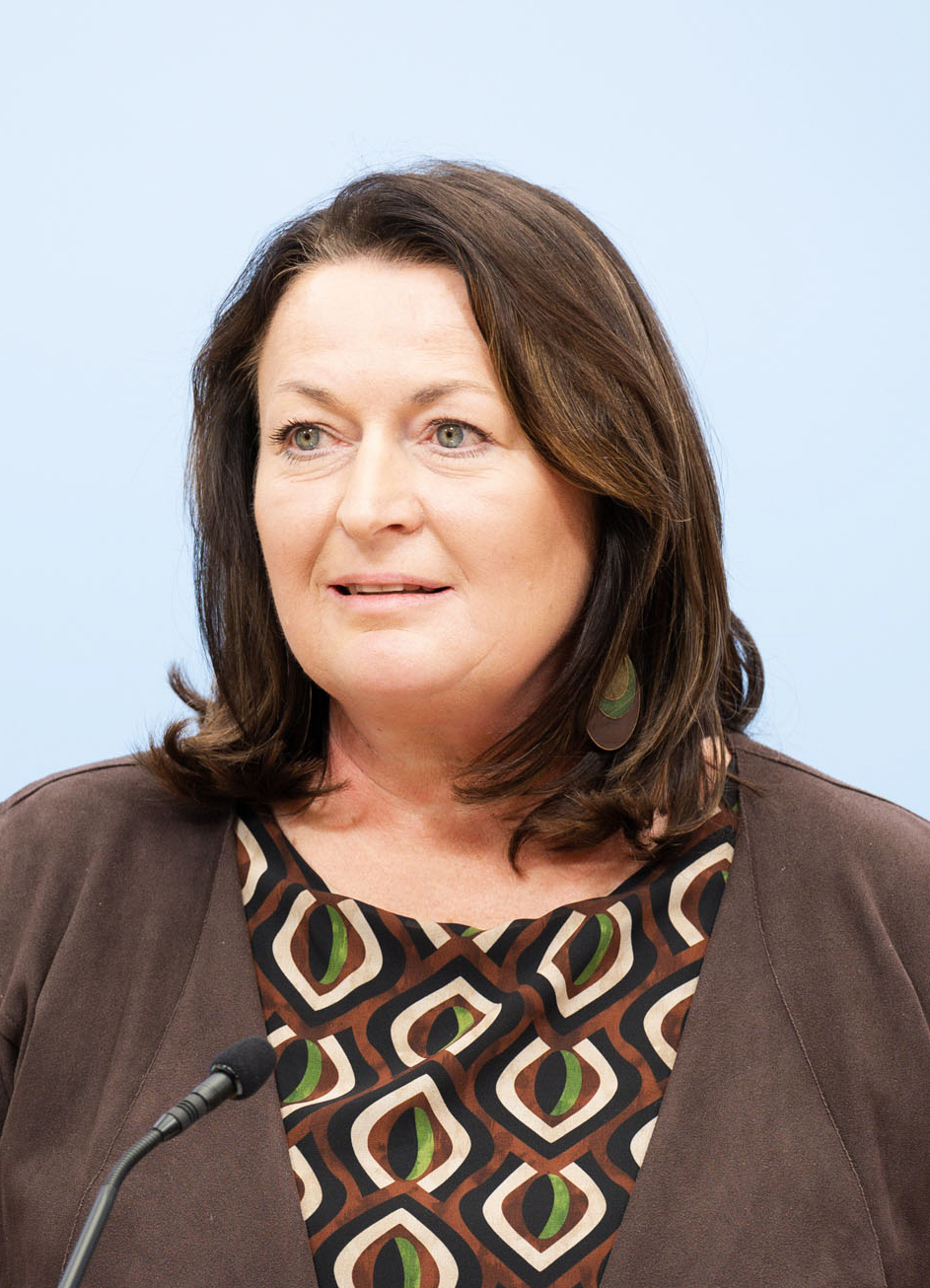
- Wimmer in May 2023

Member of the National Council
- Incumbent
- Assumed office 9 November 2017
- Constituency: Hausruckviertel

Personal details
- Born: 13 December 1965 (age 60) Wels, Austria
- Party: Social Democratic Party
- Website: petrawimmer.at

Petra Elfriede Wimmer (born 13 December 1965) is an Austrian politician and member of the National Council. A member of the Social Democratic Party, she has represented Hausruckviertel since November 2017.

Wimmer was born on 13 December 1965 in Wels. She studied at a business academy (Handelsakademie) from 1980 to 1982. She was an accountant in Wels from 1985 to 2002. She then worked for the social housing service (Sozialen Wohnservice) in Wels, as a social worker from 2003 to 2012 and as a manager from 2003 to 2017. She was a member of the municipal council in Wels from 2015 to 2017. She has been a member of the branch executive of the Social Democratic Party (SPÖ) in Upper Austria since 2017. She was elected to the National Council at the 2017 legislative election.

Electoral history of Petra Wimmer
Election	Electoral district	Party	Votes	%	Result
2013 legislative	Upper Austria	Social Democratic Party	276	0.12%	Not elected
2017 legislative	Hausruckviertel	Social Democratic Party	2,956	5.23%	Elected
2017 legislative	Upper Austria	Social Democratic Party	84	0.03%	Not elected
2019 legislative	Hausruckviertel	Social Democratic Party	3,379	7.76%	Elected
2019 legislative	Upper Austria	Social Democratic Party	94	0.05%	Not elected
