= Julie Michelle Klinger =

American geographer (born 1983)

Julie Michelle Klinger Associate Professor, University of Wisconsin, Madison
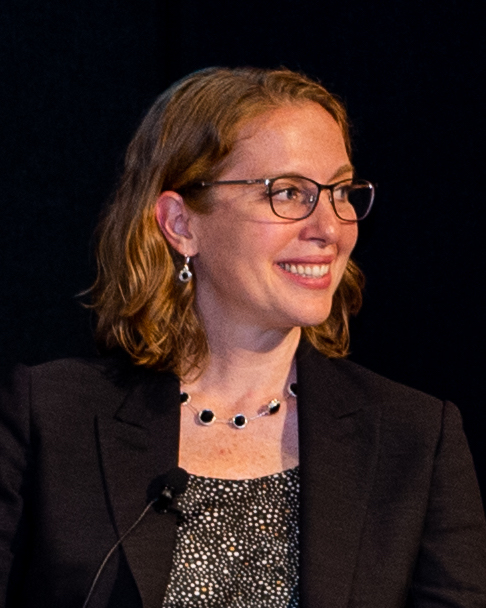
- Born: 1983 (age 42–43); Rockford, Illinois
- Education: Sarah Lawrence College, University of California, Berkeley
- Occupations: Associate Professor, University of Wisconsin, Madison
- Notable work: Rare Earth Frontiers: From Terrestrial Subsoils to Lunar Landscapes (2017)
- Awards: Meridian Book Award (2017)

Julie Michelle Klinger (born 1983, in Rockford, Illinois) is an associate professor at the University of Wisconsin-Madison Nelson Institute for Environmental Studies and a research affiliate at the Center for Sustainability and the Global Environment. She was previously an Associate Professor at the University of Delaware in the program on Geography and Spatial Sciences. Between 2015-2019 she was Assistant Professor of International Relations at the Frederick S. Pardee School of Global Studies at Boston University.

She studies the geography, geology and geopolitics of development and resource usage. She has carried out in-depth fieldwork in China, Brazil, and other countries that are affected by the mining of rare earth elements.

Klinger is the author of Rare Earth Frontiers: From Terrestrial Subsoils to Lunar Landscapes (2017) which traces the history and use of rare earth elements from the 1880s to the present. Rare Earth Frontiers won the 2017 Meridian Book Award for Outstanding Scholarly Work in Geography given by the American Association of Geographers (AAG).

== Education ==
Julie Michelle Klinger graduated from Sarah Lawrence College with a B.A. in 2006. While at Sarah Lawrence, she worked with Joshua Muldavin. In addition, she earned a certificate from the Nanjing University Center for Chinese and American Studies at Johns Hopkins University in 2007. She earned her PhD in geography at the University of California, Berkeley in 2015, with the dissertation On the Rare Earth Frontier. Her advisor was Michael J. Watts.

== Career ==
After completing her Ph.D. Klinger joined the Pardee School at Boston University where she was assistant professor for 4 years between 2015 and 2019. She also served as one of the associate directors of the Land Use and Livelihoods Initiative (LULI) at the university's Global Development Policy Center (GDP Center). In January 2020, she moved to the University of Delaware's Department of Geography and Spatial Sciences as an assistant professor in the university's new Minerals, Materials and Society Program. In 2025, she moved to the University of Wisconsin-Madison Nelson Institute for Environmental Studies to co-develop the Critical Minerals & Materials Working Group.

Klinger traces the history of rare earth elements, 17 elements which are important to a wide variety of technologies, including electronics, telecommunications, medicine, green energy (solar panels, wind turbines and electric vehicles), and defensive systems. Klinger also studies the legal and political implications of proposals to mine rare earths on the moon, which is currently protected under an international treaty.

== Rare Earth Frontiers ==
External videos
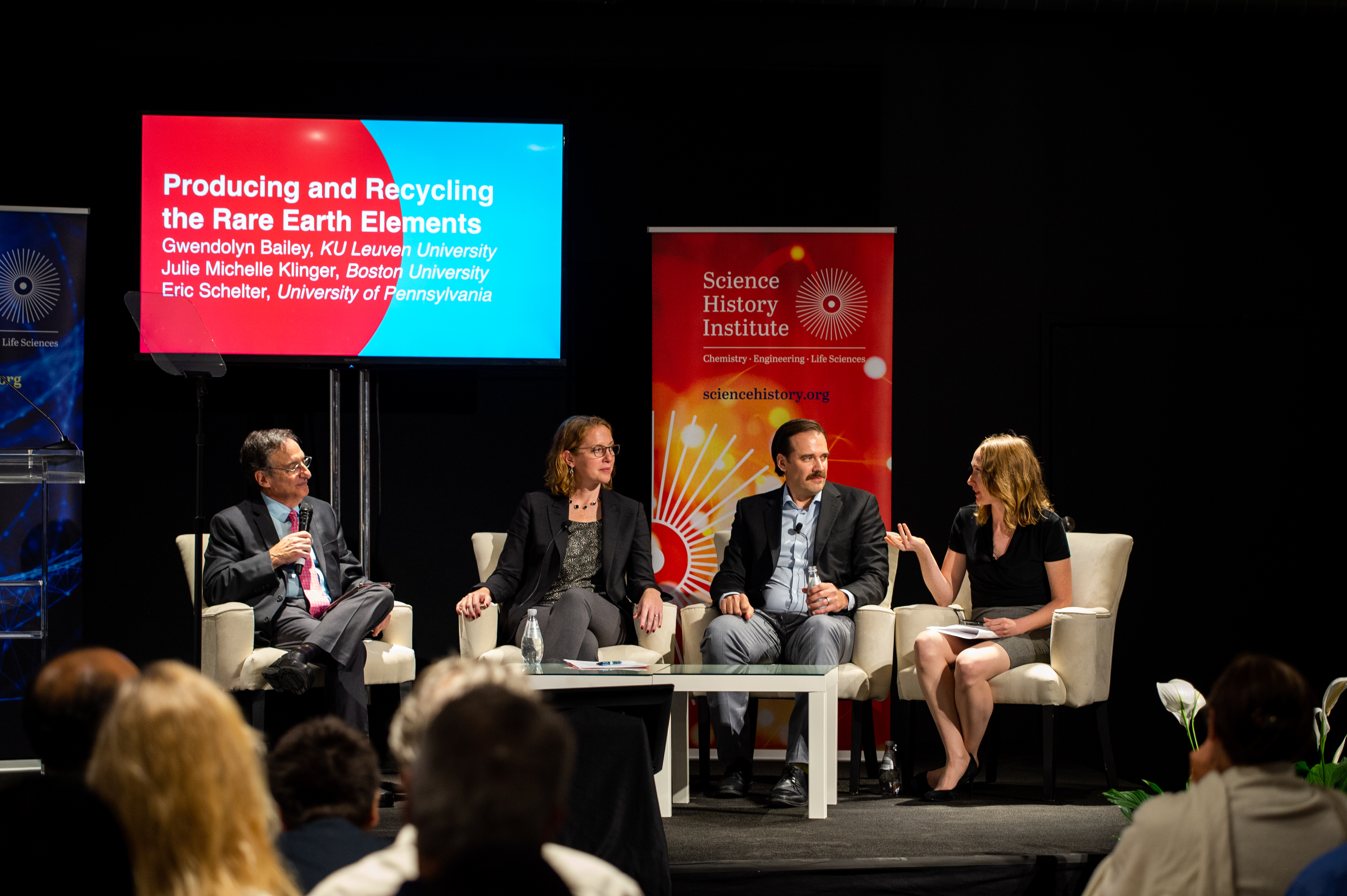
- “Rare Earths Elements: The Intersection of Science and Society”, Panel discussion including Julie Klinger, 2019.

Klinger received the 2017 Meridian Book Award for Outstanding Scholarly Work in Geography from the American Association of Geographers for her book Rare Earth Frontiers: From Terrestrial Subsoils to Lunar Landscapes. In this book, she examines the production and consumption of the so-called rare-earth elements. The book addresses geographical, geological and geopolitical issues. She examines ways in which the terms "rare earths" and "frontier" reinforce a scarcity myth that is used to justify environmental and human damage.
