= Wolfgang Klinger =

Austrian politician (born 1959)

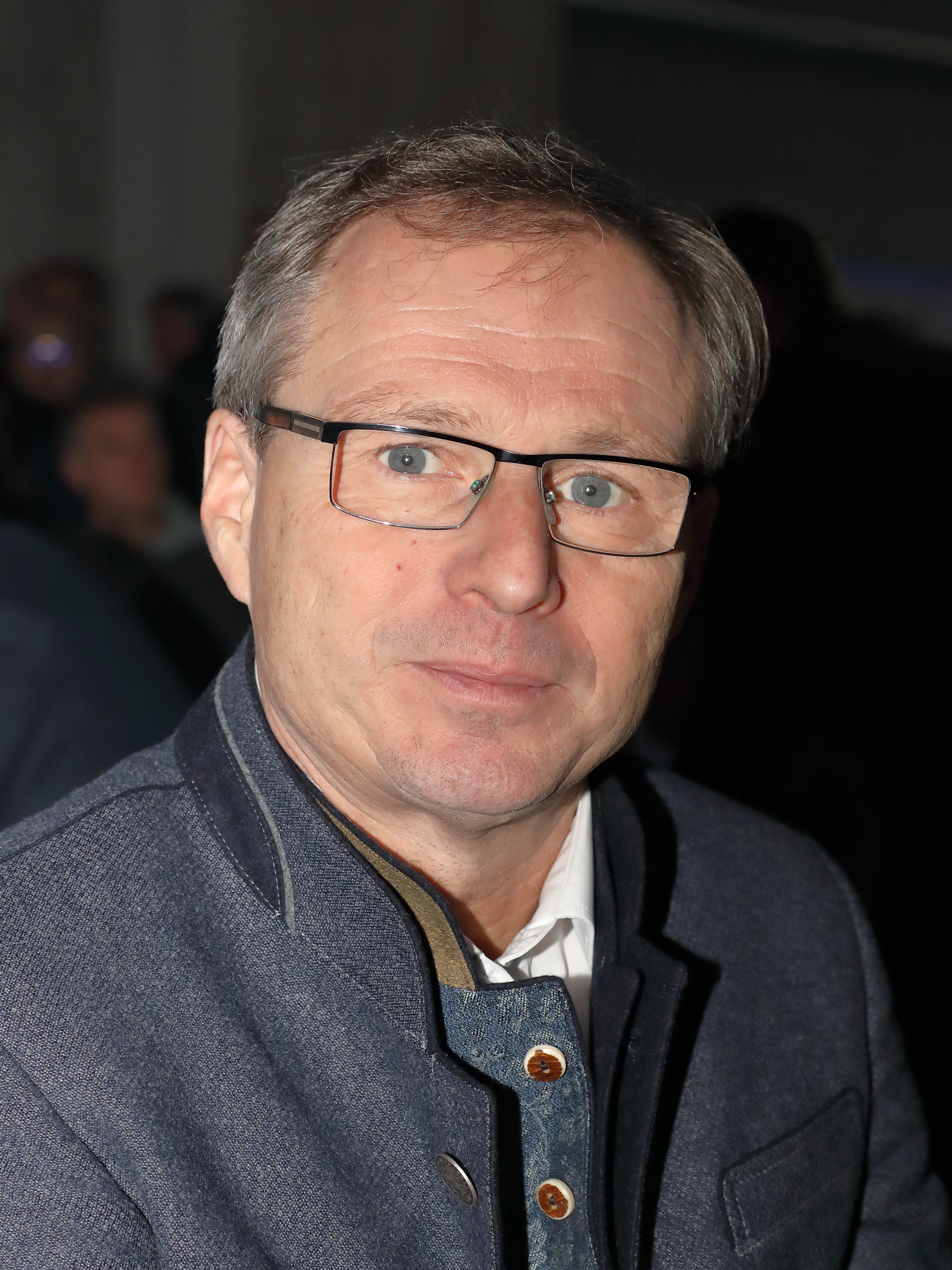

Member of the National Council
- Incumbent
- Assumed office 29 June 2016
- Constituency: 4C Hausruckviertel

Personal details
- Born: 10 May 1959 (age 66)
- Party: Freedom Party of Austria

Wolfgang Klinger (born 10 May 1959) is an Austrian politician who has been a Member of the National Council for the Freedom Party of Austria (FPÖ) since 2016.
