= Klinger (horse) =

Horse owned by the US Army

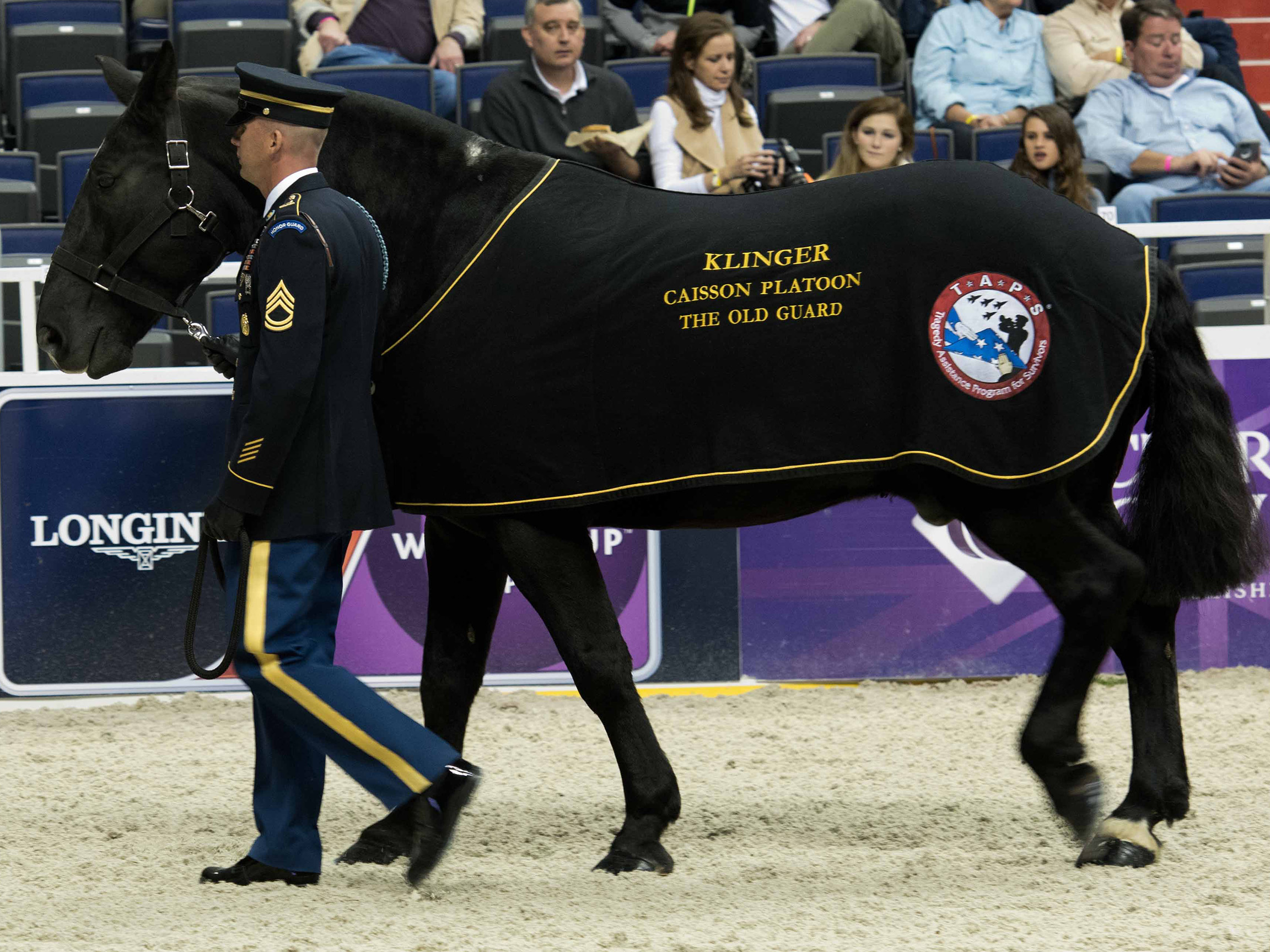
- Klinger pictured in 2015 at the Washington International Horse Show
- Species: Horse
- Breed: Morgan Percheron cross
- Sex: Gelding
- Occupation: warhorse
- Employer: United States Army
- Height: 17 hands

Klinger (foaled 2000) is a horse owned by the United States Army. An inductee into the Horse Stars Hall of Fame, as of 2017 he was posted to Washington, D.C.

== Early life and career ==
Klinger, a Morgan Percheron cross breed, was foaled in 2000 and entered military service in the United States Army the same year. As of 2017 he was posted to the John C. McKinney Stables in the Military District of Washington, assigned to the caisson platoon of the 3rd Infantry Regiment. During his time in service, Klinger has served both as a Wheel Horse, and in a leadership capacity as the Section Horse, in the caisson platoon, and has participated in more than 5,000 full-honor military funerals at Arlington National Cemetery. In addition, he has been a frequent participant in the Tragedy Assistance Program for Survivors (TAPS), a nonprofit veterans service organization that uses animal-assisted therapy to comfort survivors of tragedy.

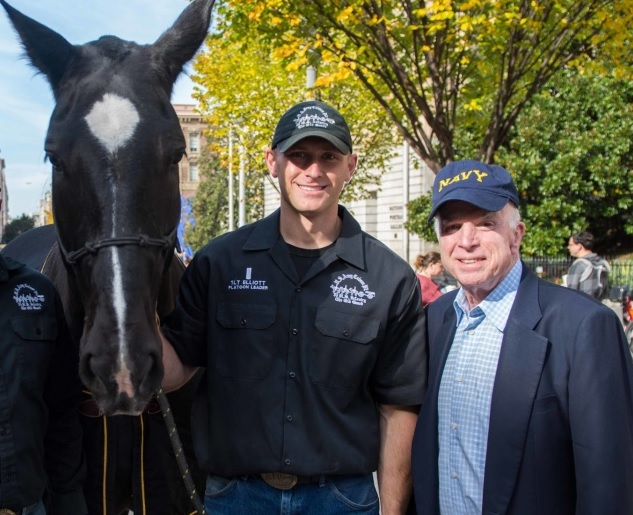
Klinger (left) pictured in 2017 with United States Senator John McCain (right).

== Characteristics ==
Klinger stands 17 hands tall. His temperament has been variously described as "friendly", "compassionate", "gentle", and "kind".

== Recognition ==
In 2012, the Washington International Horse Show established the Klinger Perpetual Award for Honor and Service, named in honor of Klinger to recognize "a horse, individual or organization that best demonstrates the values of honor and service as embodied by Klinger". Klinger has also been inducted into the United States Equestrian Federation's Horse Stars Hall of Fame. The 2010 children's book, Klinger: A Story of Honor and Hope, by Betsy Beard, is a semi-fictional biography based on the life of Klinger. In the book, a heavily fictionalized version of Klinger cavorts with children visiting Arlington National Cemetery.

== See also ==
- United States Cavalry
