= Tim Klinger =

German cyclist

Personal information
- Full name: Tim Klinger
- Born: September 22, 1984 (age 42) Wuppertal, Germany
- Height: 1.80 m (5 ft 11 in)
- Weight: 67 kg (148 lb)

Cycling career
- Sport: Cycling
- Discipline: Road
- Role: Rider

Professional teams
- 2005: Sparkasse
- 2006: Wiesenhof-Akud
- 2007–2008: Gerolsteiner
- 2009: Volksbank

Tim Klinger (born September 22, 1984 in Wuppertal) is a former German professional road bicycle racer.

== Palmares ==
- Jadranska Magistrala - Mountains Classification (2006)
