= 2007 SEA Games =

Multi-sport event in Thailand

XXIV Southeast Asian Games
- Host city: Nakhon Ratchasima, Thailand
- Motto: Spirit, Friendship and Celebrations
- Nations: 11
- Athletes: 5282
- Events: 475 in 43 sports
- Opening: 6 December 2007
- Closing: 15 December 2007
- Opened by: Vajiralongkorn; Crown Prince of Thailand
- Closed by: Surayud Chulanont; Prime Minister of Thailand
- Athlete's Oath: Suebsak Pansueb
- Judge's Oath: Paibul Srichaisawat
- Torch lighter: Udomporn Polsak
- Ceremony venue: 80th Birthday Stadium
- Website: 2007 Southeast Asian Games

The 2007 Southeast Asian Games (Thai: กีฬาแห่งเอเชียตะวันออกเฉียงใต้ 2007, romanized: Kila haeng echiye tawan oak chiyeng tai 2007), officially known as the 24th Southeast Asian Games, were a Southeast Asian multi-sport event held in Nakhon Ratchasima (Korat), Thailand. This was the sixth time Thailand hosted the Southeast Asian Games and its first time since 1995. Previously, Thailand also hosted the 1959 inaugural games, 1967 games, 1975 games and the 1985 games.

The Thai Olympic Committee planned the event to coincide with the commemoration of 80th birthday of King Bhumibol Adulyadej who was also the gold medalist of the sailing event at the 1967 games. The games was held from 6 to 15 December 2007 although several events had commenced from 27 November 2007. Around 5282 athletes participated at the event which featured 475 events in 43 sports. It was opened by Vajiralongkorn, then the Crown Prince of Thailand, at the 80th Birthday Stadium.

The final medal tally was led by host nation Thailand, followed by Malaysia and Vietnam. Several Games and national records were broken during the games. The games were deemed generally successful with the rising standards of competition amongst the Southeast Asian nations.

== Host city ==
Singapore was due to host the 2007 Southeast Asian Games, but it withdrew from hosting to demolish and rebuild its national stadium. A general assembly of the SEA Games Federation Council during the 2003 Southeast Asian Games in Hanoi, Vietnam approved Thailand's hosting of the games.

== Development and preparation ==
On 24 February 2006, northeast Thailand's Nakhon Ratchasima province authorities met to discuss the 2007 SEA Games schedule, and progress on the province's under-construction US$65 million sports complex. Presided over by governor Somboon Ngamlak, the meeting provided an overview of facilities, and ended with reassurances that facilities would be ready for SEA Games in 2007.

2007 Southeast Asian Games host cities

=== Torch relay ===
A torch relay was held across the nation prior to the hosting of the games. On 8 November 2007, Prince Vajiralongkorn, on behalf of his father, King Bhumibol Adulyadej presented the royal flame to the games organising committee chairman, Suvit Yodmani. Following the presentation, the flame was installed in Bangkok at the Bangkok City Hall. After that, the flame was relayed from Bangkok to provinces such as Chonburi, Samut Songkhram, Prachuap Khiri Khan, Ratchaburi, Suphanburi, Nakhon Sawan, Phichit, Phitsanulok, Phetchabun, Loei, Nong Khai, Sakhon Nahkhon, Mukdahan, Ubon Ratchatthani, Surin, Roi Et and Khon Kaen before arrived in the host province, Nakhon Ratchasima on 26 November 2007. In Nakhon Ratchasima, the flame was relayed across its districts such as Phimai, Choke Chai, Pak Thong Chai, Pak Chong and Soongnern before arrived at Nakhon Ratchasima City, the host city of the games on 1 December 2007. The flame was then installed at the monument of Thao Suranari before the games' opening ceremony.

=== Branding and design ===
"Can" the Korat cat, the official mascot of the games

The logo of the games is a silhouette of three sailing boats arranged in a row, representing the 40th anniversary that His Majesty the King Bhumibol Adulyadej won a gold medal in sailing at the 1967 Southeast Asian Peninsular Games and the 80th anniversary of his birthday. It was designed by Prasit Nunsung from Nonthaburi. The three boats in the logo represents the development, the blending of colours and the technology of Thailand. While the yellow colour on the largest boat represents the King himself, along with red and blue, it is one of the colours on the flag of ASEAN and represents the unity and friendship among the games' participants and the people of Southeast Asia. The 10-circle chain, which is also the logo of the Southeast Asian Games Federation, represents the 10 member nations, excluding Timor-Leste. The shape of the boats resemble the Pimai castle, a symbol of host city Nakhon Ratchasima, as well as the Northeast region of Thailand and its thousand-year-old civilization.

The mascot of the games is a Korat cat named Can. He wears the Northeast region of Thailand's traditional garments and plays the khaen, a mouth organ that the region is famous for. The name of the musical instrument aforementioned coincidentally has a similar pronunciation to his name. He was created by Sa-ard Jomngarm and his name "Can" was given by an eight-year-old girl, Piyathida Sreewimon.

Four songs were composed for the games including "Rhythm of the Winner", the theme song of the games. The other songs are: "We are the Water", "Friendship Card" and "Korat SEA Games".

== Venues ==
Most of the Games were held in the His Majesty the King's 80th Birthday Anniversary, 5 December 2007, Sports Complex on Pakthongchai Road in Nakhon Ratchasima after a US$65 million reconstruction for the event. The sports complex holds the 24,000-seater 80th Birthday Stadium, two indoor stadiums and many other facilities. Aside from Nakhon Ratchasima, events were held in Bangkok and Chonburi. In Suranaree University of Technology, the students' residence was used as the athletes' village while Suraphat 2 Building was used as the main press centre.

39 venues were used for the games: 28 in Nakhon Ratchasima, 6 in Bangkok and 5 in Chonburi.

Province	Competition venue	Sports
Nakhon Ratchasima	His Majesty the King's 80th Birthday Anniversary, 5 December 2007, Sports Complex
Nakhon Ratchasima	80th Birthday Stadium	Opening and closing ceremonies, Athletics, Football
Nakhon Ratchasima	Aquatic Centre	Diving, Swimming, Water Polo
Nakhon Ratchasima	Beach Volleyball Stadium	Volleyball
Nakhon Ratchasima	Liptapanlop Hall	Gymnastics
Nakhon Ratchasima	Korat Chatchai Hall	Volleyball
Nakhon Ratchasima	Tennis Court	Tennis
Nakhon Ratchasima	Velodrome	Cycling
Nakhon Ratchasima	Suranaree University of Technology
Nakhon Ratchasima	Secondary Football Field	Archery
Nakhon Ratchasima	Keelapirom Gymnasium	Basketball
Nakhon Ratchasima	National Synchrotron Research Centre	Fencing
Nakhon Ratchasima	Pétanque Court	Pétanque
Nakhon Ratchasima	Surapala Keetha Sathan Stadium	Football
Nakhon Ratchasima	Others
Nakhon Ratchasima	Amphoe Pak Thong Chai Sport Complex	Boxing, Football
Nakhon Ratchasima	Bonanza Golf and Country Club	Golf
Nakhon Ratchasima	Chanapolkhan Institute of Technology	Karate, Wushu
Nakhon Ratchasima	Khao Yai Thiang	Cycling
Nakhon Ratchasima	Klang Plaza Jomsurang Department Store	Table tennis
Nakhon Ratchasima	Mittraphap Road	Cycling
Nakhon Ratchasima	Nakhon Ratchasima Municipal Stadium	Football, Muay
Nakhon Ratchasima	Nakhon Ratchasima Rajabhat University	Bodybuilding, Softball
Nakhon Ratchasima	Nakhon Ratchasima Vocational College	Weightlifting
Nakhon Ratchasima	Rajamangala University of Technology, Isan	Judo, Wrestling
Nakhon Ratchasima	Sima Thani Hotel	Billiards and snooker
Nakhon Ratchasima	Sung Noen Municipality Hall	Pencak silat
Nakhon Ratchasima	Suranaree Camp	Rugby union
Nakhon Ratchasima	The Mall Department Store	Sepak takraw
Nakhon Ratchasima	Vongchavalitkul University	Badminton, Dancesport, Taekwondo
Bangkok	Hua Mark Indoor Stadium	Futsal
Bangkok	Nimibutr Stadium	Handball
Bangkok	Queen Sirikit Sport Centre	Baseball, Field hockey, Lawn bowls
Bangkok	Ratchaphruek Club	Squash
Bangkok	SF Strike Bowl	Bowling
Bangkok	Sport Authority of Thailand Sport Complex	Shooting
Bangkok	VR Sport Club	Polo
Chonburi	Ambassador City Jomtien	Triathlon
Chonburi	Horseshoe Point	Equestrian
Chonburi	Map Prachan Reservoir	Canoeing, Rowing, Traditional boat race
Chonburi	Ocean Marina Yacht Club	Sailing
Chonburi	Thai Polo Club	Equestrian

== The games ==
=== Opening ceremony ===
The opening ceremony which divided into eight segments was held on 6 December 2007 at 19:00 (TST) at the 80th birthday stadium. Thai audiences clad in mostly pink and yellow as symbol of loyalty to the king, packed the stadium hours before the ceremony starts. After the Thai royal family entered the stadium, the royal anthem is first played. The ceremony began with the first segment entitled "The Amazing Great King", a 10-minute tribute to the late King Bhumibol Adulyadej, then the longest reigning monarch in the world at that time. This was followed by second and third segment named "The Amazing E-Saan Wonder" and "The Amazing Glorious City" respectively, highlighting the history and culture of the Isan (northeast) region and its main city, Korat which were accompanied by a dazzling laser display and incorporated replicas of colourful ancient temples and gigantic dragon boats.

After that, the fourth segment "The Amazing Sport Ceremony" was held began with the parade of the contingents from the 11 participating nations. The Thai contingent, the largest contingent among the participating nations received the warmest welcome from the audiences when they enter the stadium. After the athletes and officials had assembled on the field, Thai Sports Minister Suvit Yodmani, the Games organising chairman, delivered his speech and the Games was then officially opened by the Crown Prince Maha Vajiralongkorn, on behalf of his father, the King of Thailand. It was followed by the Thai National Anthem when the national flag of Thailand was raised and the raising of the Games flag and the oath-taking ceremony in which Suebsak Pansueb took the oath on behalf of the athletes and Paibul Srichaisawat on behalf of the judges. Later during "The Amazing Royal Flame", the fifth segment of the ceremony, a group of athletes passes the flame during the torch relay one after another before the Thai female weightlifter cum gold medalist at the Athens Olympics, Udomporn Polsak lit the Games cauldron.

The ceremony concludes with "The Amazing Spirit", "The Amazing Friendship" and "The Amazing Celebrations" segments which were performed by more than 8,000 students from 35 learning institutions. The segments were held in accordance with the Games' tagline of 'Spirit, Friendship and Celebrations'.

=== Closing ceremony ===
The closing ceremony which was divided into seven segments was held on 15 December 2007 at 19:00 (TST) at the 80th birthday stadium and was preceded by a pre-ceremony song and dance performance entitled "A Message from the Heart", the arrival of the Thai Prime Minister and other dignitaries. The ceremony began with a four-minute "The Creation of Spirit" segment, a musical sketch showcasing Thailand's rich traditional culture. This was followed by "The Creation of Friendship" and "The Creation of Celebrations" segment, the two musical performances by school students who formed ‘human formations’ in the middle of the field. Later, "The Creation of Sport Ceremony" segment was held with the contingents from the 11 participating nations marched into the stadium to the folk music of respective nations as the fireworks lit up the skies.

After the athletes and officials assembled at the stadium, Thai Prime Minister Gen Surayud Chulanont gave his speech and declared the games closed. Prime Minister Surayud then entitled Swimmers Miguel Molina of the Philippines and Natthanan Junkajang of Thailand as the Most Valuable Athletes of the Games. With Thai national flag and the Games flag lowered, the SEA Games responsibility was handed over to Laos, host of the 2009 Southeast Asian Games in which the Deputy Prime Minister of Laos, Somsavat Lengsavad received the games flag as its symbol. A Laos segment performance was performed by Lao dancers with their traditional performances.

During "The Creation of Hope" segment, The flame of the cauldron was extinguished by a man dress as a Korat boy on two wheeled cart, symbolised the end of the games. The ceremony concluded with two Thai farewell segment performances namely "The Creation of Live World" and "The Creation of Happiness and Prosperity".

=== Participating nations ===
Around 5282 athletes were participating at the games.

- Brunei (61 athletes)
- Cambodia (232)
- Indonesia (574)
- Laos (414)
- Malaysia (820)
- Myanmar (506)
- Philippines (620)
- Singapore (442)
- Thailand (982) (Host)
- Timor-Leste (7)
- Vietnam (624)

=== Sports ===
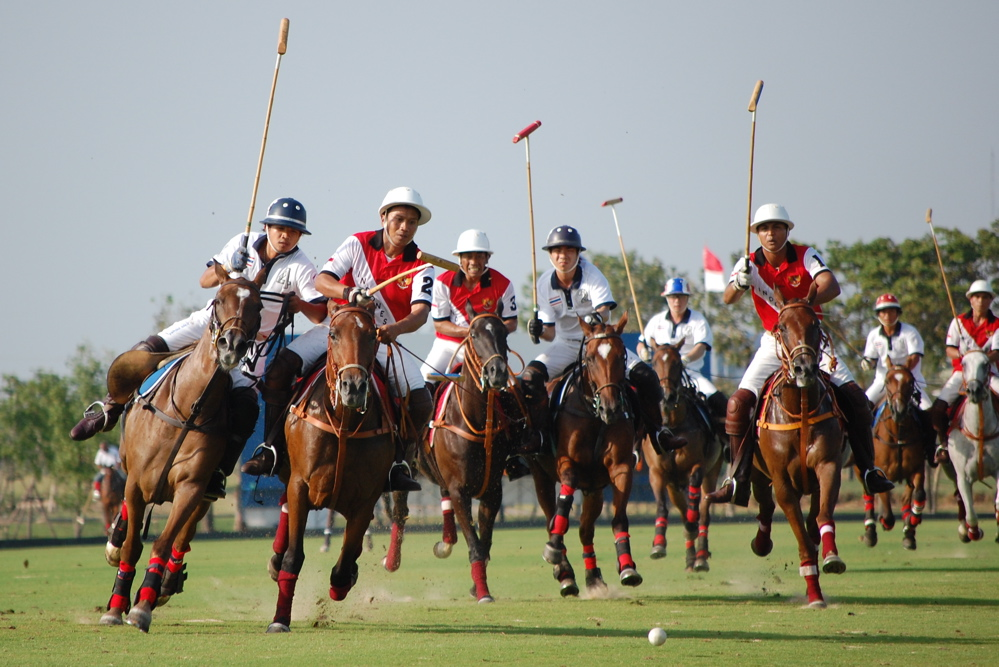
Indonesia plays against Thailand in SEA Games Polo 2007

The 2007 SEA Games featured 43 sports which consists of 475 events and also 2 demonstration sports (i.e. Go and Kempo).

- Archery (8)
- Aquatics (43)
- Athletics (45)
- Badminton (7)
- Baseball (1)
- Basketball (2)
- Billiards and snooker (13) ¹
- Bodybuilding (11) ¹
- Boxing (17)
- Bowling (11) ¹
- Canoeing (12)
- Cycling (19)
- Dancesport (10) ³
- Equestrian (6)
- Fencing (12)
- Field hockey (2)
- Football (4)
- Golf (4)
- Gymnastics (24)
- Handball (2)
- Judo (16)
- Karate (18) ¹
- Lawn bowls (6) ²
- Muay (11) ²
- Pencak silat (14) ²
- Pétanque (9) ²
- Polo (1) ¹
- Rowing (11)
- Rugby union (2) °
- Sailing (17)
- Sepak takraw (8) ¹
- Shooting (34)
- Softball (2) °
- Squash (1) ¹
- Table tennis (7)
- Taekwondo (16)
- Tennis (7)
- Traditional boat race (4) ¹
- Triathlon (4)
- Volleyball (4)
- Weightlifting (13)
- Wrestling (9)
- Wushu (14) ¹

¹ – not an official Olympic Sport
² – sport played only in the SEAG
³ – not a traditional Olympic nor SEAG Sport and introduced only by the host country.
° – a former official Olympic Sport, not applied in previous host countries and was introduced only by the host country.

=== Calendar ===
OC	Opening ceremony	●	Event competitions	1	Gold medal events	CC	Closing ceremony

November / December	27 Tue	28 Wed	29 Thu	30 Fri	1 Sat	2 Sun	3 Mon	4 Tue	5 Wed	6 Thu	7 Fri	8 Sat	9 Sun	10 Mon	11 Tue	12 Wed	13 Thu	14 Fri	15 Sat	Events
Ceremonies										OC									CC	—N/a
Archery											●	●	●	●	4	4				8
Athletics											9	11	4	9	12					45
Badminton												●	●	2	●	●	●	5		7
Baseball											●	●	●	●	●	●	●	1		1
Basketball											●	●	●	●	●	●	2			2
Billiards and snooker										1	1	3	●	3	2	1	2			13
Bodybuilding														●	5					5
Bowling											2	2	2	2	●	2	1			11
Boxing											●	●	●	●	●	7	10			17
Canoeing															●	5	●	7		12
Cycling									●	2	2		2	3	5	3	2			19
Dancesport												5	5							10
Diving																1	2	5	2	10
Equestrian											1	●	1	1		1	●	●	2	6
Fencing												3	3	3	3					12
Football					●	●	●	●	●		●	●	●	●	●		3	1		4
Golf														●	●	●	4			4
Gymnastics									4		1	1	2	10		●	1	1	4	24
Handball											●	●	●	●	1	1				2
Hockey												●	●	●	●		2			2
Judo															4	4	4	4		16
Karate																4	7	7		18
Lawn bowls													●	●	●	6				6
Muay													●	●	●		11			11
Pencak silat											●	●	1	●		13				14
Petanque											2	●	2	●	3	●	2			9
Polo										●		●	●		●		●		1	1
Rowing										●	●	6	5							11
Rugby													●	●	2					2
Sailing												●	●	●	●	●	●	17		17
Sepak takraw									●	2	●	●	2	●	●	2	●	●	2	8
Shooting	7	6	6	6	6	1	2													34
Swimming											7	6	7	6	6					32
Softball												●	●	●	●	●	2			2
Squash											●	●	●	1						1
Table tennis							●	●	2		●	1	2	2						7
Taekwondo																6	6	4		16
Tennis											●	●	2	●	●	●	●	2	3	7
Traditional boat race															●	2	●	2		4
Triathlon												2	2							4
Volleyball											●	●	●	●	●	●	●	2	2	4
Water polo											●	●	●	●	1					1
Weightlifting												2	3	3	2	3				13
Wrestling											3	3	3							9
Wushu											1	●	●	13						14
Daily medal events	7	6	6	6	6	1	2	0	6	5	29	43	48	58	50	65	60	61	16	475
Cumulative total	7	13	19	25	31	32	34	34	40	45	74	117	165	223	273	338	398	459	475	475
November / December	27 Tue	28 Wed	29 Thu	30 Fri	1 Sat	2 Sun	3 Mon	4 Tue	5 Wed	6 Thu	7 Fri	8 Sat	9 Sun	10 Mon	11 Tue	12 Wed	13 Thu	14 Fri	15 Sat	Total events

=== Medal table ===
A total of 1542 medals, comprising 477 gold medals, 470 silver medals, and 595 bronze medals were awarded to athletes. The Host Thailand performance was its best ever yet in Southeast Asian Games history and emerged as overall champion of the games.

Key

* Host nation (Thailand)

Rank	Nation	Gold	Silver	Bronze	Total
1	Thailand*	183	123	103	409
2	Malaysia	68	52	96	216
3	Vietnam	64	58	82	204
4	Indonesia	56	64	83	203
5	Singapore	43	43	41	127
6	Philippines	41	91	96	228
7	Myanmar	14	26	47	87
8	Laos	5	7	32	44
9	Cambodia	2	5	11	18
10	Brunei	1	1	4	6
11	Timor-Leste	0	0	0	0
Totals (11 entries)		477	470	595	1,542

== Concerns and controversies ==
- Two Thai athletes, Surathep Wisawathiron and Panaporn Kosol were ousted from the games after they were tested positive for doping.

== Main official host television broadcasting ==
Country	Official broadcasters	Television broadcast
Brunei	Radio Television Brunei	RTB 5 RTB 8
Indonesia	Televisi Republik Indonesia	TVRI
Malaysia	Radio Televisyen Malaysia	RTM TV1
Philippines	National Broadcasting Network; Intercontinental Broadcasting Corporation	NBN 4 IBC 13
Singapore	Mediacorp	Channel 5
Thailand	Television Pool of Thailand	
Vietnam	Vietnam Television	VTV1

== See also ==
- 2008 ASEAN Para Games

Preceded by Manila	Southeast Asian Games; Nakhon Ratchasima; XXIV Southeast Asian Games (2007)	Succeeded by Vientiane
