= Cambodia at the 2007 SEA Games =

Cambodia at the 2007 Southeast Asian Games
- IOC code: CAM
- NOC: National Olympic Committee of Cambodia
- Website: www.noccambodia.org (in Khmer and English)

in Nakhon Ratchasima
- Medals Ranked 9th: Gold 2 Silver 5 Bronze 12 Total 19

Southeast Asian Games appearances (overview)
- 1961; 1965; 1967–1981; 1983; 1985; 1987; 1989–1993; 1995; 1997; 1999; 2001; 2003; 2005; 2007; 2009; 2011; 2013; 2015; 2017; 2019; 2021; 2023; 2025; 2027; 2029

Cambodia participated in the 2007 Southeast Asian Games held in the city of Nakhon Ratchasima, Thailand from December 6, 2007 to December 16, 2007.

During the competition, the Cambodian delegation finished ninth in the overall medal tally, securing a total of 19 medals, including two golds.

== Participation details ==
Rank No. 9 (2007)

Medal Tally
Gold=2
Silver=5
Bronze=12
Total=19
