= Klang Plaza =

- Location: Nakhon Ratchasima, Thailand
- Coordinates: 14.9762°N 102.1014°E
- Address: Asadang Road, Jomsurang Road
- Owner: Manasilp family
- Website: www.klangplaza.com

Klang Plaza (Thai: คลังพลาซ่า) is a local shopping mall in Nakhon Ratchasima, Thailand. It has three outlets and is building a fourth near the railway station. It was founded by local businessman, Mr Paisarn Manasilp. The business started in 1958 with a book and stationery store, Klang Wittaya, which is still in operation. The company operates under the motto "The Korat Department Store." It concentrates on supermarket and stationery supplies and ensuring that its stores are within walking distance of city neighbourhoods.

== Klang Plaza Asadang ==
Klang Plaza Asadang was founded in 1976. It was considered as biggest shopping mall in northeastern Thailand at the time. It contained a large food center and children's play park. Its shops and services include:

- Klang Supermarket (2nd floor)
- Klang Bookstore (mezzanine between 2nd and 3rd floor
- Klang Plaza Asadang Food Center (basement)
- KFC (2nd floor)
- Dunkin' Donuts (ground floor)

== Klang Plaza Jomsurang ==
Klang Plaza Jomsurang was founded in 1991. The store is in the city center, 100 meters from the Thao Suranaree Monument. The store has nine floors and parking for more than 400 cars. It was the biggest shopping mall in the northeast. Its shops and services include:

- Klang Supermarket (basement)
- Klang Book Store (3rd floor)
- Klang IT Center (4th floor)
- Klang Plaza Jomsurang Food Center (5th floor)
- IT City (5th floor)
- B2S (2nd floor)
- Supersports (3rd floor)
- Bangkok Bank (ground floor)

It also has franchise food shops and restaurants like KFC, Hot Pot Buffet Value, M.D. Suki, Dairy Queen, Yamazaki Bakery. There is an indoor amusement park and karaoke on the 6th floor, a BB gun range and bowling on 8th floor.

== See also ==
- List of shopping malls in Thailand
