= List of ITTF World Tour winners =

The list of ITTF World Tour (known as the ITTF Pro Tour from its inception in 1996 until 2011) is in alphabetical order by names of tournaments.

== Argentina Open ==
Year location	Men's singles	Women's singles	Men's doubles	Women's doubles
2015; Mendoza	(Brazil) Eric Jouti	(South Korea) Jeon Ji-hee	(Argentina) Gaston Alto (Argentina) Pablo Tabachnik	(South Korea) Jeon Ji-hee (South Korea) Yang Ha-eun
2014; Buenos Aires	(China) Cheng Zhu	(China) Zhuojia He		

== Australian Open ==
Year location	Men's singles	Women's singles	Men's doubles	Women's doubles	Mixed doubles
2019; Geelong	(China) Xu Xin	(China) Sun Yingsha	(South Korea) Jung Young-sik (South Korea) Lee Sang-su	(China) Chen Meng (China) Wang Manyu	(Hong Kong) Wong Chun Ting (Hong Kong) Doo Hoi-Kem
2018; Geelong	(China) Xu Xin	(China) Liu Shiwen	(South Korea) Jung Young-sik (South Korea) Lee Sang-su	(Japan) Hina Hayata (Japan) Mima Ito	(South Korea) Jeon Ji-hee (South Korea) Lee Sang-su
2017; Gold Coast	(Belarus) Vladimir Samsonov	(China) Chen Meng	(South Korea) Jang Woo-jin (South Korea) Park Gang-hyeon	(China) Chen Meng (China) Zhu Yuling	
2016; Melbourne	(Japan) Jun Mizutani	(Japan) Hina Hayata	(Japan) Takuya Jin (Japan) Yuki Morita	(Japan) Honoka Hashimoto (Japan) Hitomi Sato	
2015; Gold Coast	(South Korea) Jung Young-Sik	(Japan) Ai Fukuhara	(Hong Kong) Ho Kwan Kit (Hong Kong) Lam Siu Hang	(South Korea) Jeon Jihee (South Korea) Lee Dasom	
2014; Sydney	(Singapore) Wu Zhikang	(Singapore) Feng Tianwei	(Hong Kong) Tang Peng (Hong Kong) Wong Chun Ting	(Japan) Saki Tashiro (Japan) Yuko Fujii	
1999; Melbourne	(China) Ma Lin	(Chinese Taipei) Chen Jing	(Austria) Karl Jindrak (Austria) Werner Schlager	(Chinese Taipei) Chen Jing (Chinese Taipei) Xu Jing	
1998; Melbourne	(China) Kong Linghui	(China) Yang Ying	(China) Kong Linghui (China) Liu Guoliang	(China) Wu Na (China) Yang Ying	
1997; Melbourne	(China) Ding Song	(China) Deng Yaping	(China) Ma Lin (China) Yan Sen	(China) Deng Yaping (China) Yang Ying	
1996; Brisbane	(Austria) Werner Schlager	(China) Wang Chen	(Austria) Karl Jindrak (Austria) Werner Schlager	(China) Wang Chen (China) Zhu Fang	

== Austrian Open ==
Year location	Men's singles	Women's singles	Men's doubles	Women's doubles	Mixed doubles
2018; Linz	(China) Liang Jingkun	(China) Chen Meng	(Japan) Morizono Masataka (Japan) Oshima Yuya	(Japan) Hina Hayata (Japan) Mima Ito	(China) Xu Xin (China) Liu Shiwen
2017; Linz	(China) Lin Gaoyuan	(China) Wang Manyu	(Japan) Koki Niwa (Japan) Jin Ueda	(China) Chen Xingtong (China) Sun Yingsha	
2016; Linz	(Japan) Kenta Matsudaira	(Japan) Mima Ito	(Germany) Patrick Franziska (Denmark) Jonathan Groth	(Japan) Honoka Hashimoto (Japan) Hitomi Sato	
2015	(Japan) Jun Mizutani	(Germany) Han Ying	(South Korea) Woojin Jang (South Korea) Lee Sang-su	(Germany) Shan Xiaona (Germany) Petrissa Solja	
2013	(China) Fang Bo	(China) Ding Ning	(China) Hao Shuai (China) Zhang Jike	(China) Ding Ning (China) Li Xiaoxia	
2011; Schwechat	(China) Ma Long	(China) Ding Ning	(China) Ma Long (China) Wang Hao	(China) Ding Ning (China) Li Xiaoxia	
2010; Wels	(Portugal) Tiago Apolonia	(China) Guo Yue	(Hong Kong) Jiang Tianyi (Hong Kong) Tang Peng	(China) Guo Yue (China) Li Xiaoxia	
2008; Salzburg	(Germany) Timo Boll	(Poland) Li Qian	Austria^{[1]}	Hungary	
2007; Wels	(China) Chen Qi	(China) Zhang Yining	(Singapore) Yang Zi (Singapore) Gao Ning	(Japan) Ai Fukuhara (Japan) Sayaka Hirano	
2004; Wels	(Germany) Timo Boll	(China) Niu Jianfeng	(Hong Kong) Ko Lai Chak (Hong Kong) Li Ching	(China) Li Xiaoxia (China) Cao Zhen	
2002; Wels	(Germany) Timo Boll	(China) Li Nan	(Hong Kong) Cheung Yuk (Hong Kong) Leung Chu Yan	(China) Fan Ying (China) Guo Yue	
1999; Linz/Wels	(China) Kong Linghui	(Germany) Qianhong Gotsch-He	(China) Kong Linghui (China) Liu Guoliang	(China) Li Ju (China) Wang Nan	
1997; Linz	(Croatia) Zoran Primorac	(Germany) Jing Tian-Zörner	(Germany) Jörg Roßkopf (Belarus) Vladimir Samsonov	(South Korea) Lee Eun-Sil (South Korea) Ryu Ji-Hae	

1. Doubles events were replaced with team events.

== Belarus Open ==
Year location	Men's singles	Women's singles	Men's doubles	Women's doubles
2019; Minsk	(France) Emmanuel Lebesson	(Japan) Hina Hayata	(China) Xu Haidong (China) Zhao Zhaoyan	(Japan) Satsuki Odo (Japan) Saki Shibata
2018; Minsk	(China) Zhao Zihao	(Japan) Saki Shibata	(Japan) Kakeru Sone (Japan) Yuta Tanaka	(Japan) Satsuki Odo (Japan) Saki Shibata
2017; Minsk	(Belarus) Vladimir Samsonov	(Japan) Hitomi Sato	(Poland) Daniel Górak (Poland) Wang Zengyi	(Japan) Miyu Kato (Japan) Misaki Morizono
2016; Minsk	(South Korea) Jang Woo-jin	(Japan) Saki Shibata	(South Korea) Jang Woo-jin (South Korea) Lim Jong-hoon	(Japan) Honoka Hashimoto (Japan) Hitomi Sato
2015; Minsk	(Qatar) Li Ping	(Japan) Mima Ito	(Denmark) Jonathan Groth (Denmark) Kasper Sternberg	(Japan) Miyu Maeda (Japan) Sakura Mori
2014; Minsk	(Belarus) Vladimir Samsonov	(Japan) Sayaka Hirano	No played	No played
2013; Minsk	(Japan) Kaii Yoshida	(Germany) Sabine Winter	No played	No played
2012; Minsk	(Russia) Vasily Lakeev	(Russia) Polina Mikhaylova	No played	No played
2009; Minsk	(Serbia) Žolt Pete	(South Korea) Dang Ye-Seo	(Austria) Christoph Simoner (Austria) Mathias Habesohn	(South Korea) Park Young-Sook (South Korea) Dang Ye-Seo
2008; Minsk	(Belarus) Vladimir Samsonov	(Belarus) Viktoria Pavlovich	China^{[1]}	Belarus

1. Doubles events were replaced with team events.

== Belgium Open ==
Year location	Men's singles	Women's singles	Men's doubles	Women's doubles
2016	(India) Sathiyan Gnanasekaran	(Hungary) Georgina Póta	(Russia) Alexey Liventsov (Russia) Mikhail Paikov	(Hungary) Georgina Póta (Russia) Yulia Prokhorova
2015	(Iran) Nima Alamian	(South Korea) Seo Hyo-won	(Iran) Nima Alamian (Iran) Noshad Alamian	(Singapore) Lin Ye (Singapore) Zhou Yihan
2014	(Belarus) Vladimir Samsonov	(Hungary) Georgina Póta		

== Brazil Open ==
Year location	Men's singles	Women's singles	Men's doubles	Women's doubles
2017; São Paulo	(Brazil) Hugo Calderano	(Romania) Bernadette Szőcs	(Brazil) Hugo Calderano (Brazil) Gustavo Tsuboi	(Romania) Bernadette Szőcs (France) Audrey Zarif
2014	(China) Dingshuo Liu	(China) Xin Liu		
2013; Santos	(Brazil) Hugo Calderano	(Romania) Elizabeta Samara		
2012; Santos	(South Korea) Oh Sang-Eun	(South Korea) Kim Kyung-Ah	(South Korea) Oh Sang-Eun (South Korea) Ryu Seung-Min	(Singapore) Li Jiawei (Singapore) Wang Yuegu
2011; Rio de Janeiro	(Germany) Dimitrij Ovtcharov	(Singapore) Wang Yuegu	(Germany) Lars Hielscher (Germany) Bastian Steger	(Singapore) Li Jiawei (Singapore) Wang Yuegu
2008; Belo Horizonte	(Hong Kong) Jiang Tianyi	(Singapore) Wang Yuegu	(South Korea) Kim Jung-Hoon (South Korea) Yoon Jae-Young	(South Korea) Kim Kyung-Ah (South Korea) Park Mi-Young
2007; Belo Horizonte	(Japan) Yo Kan	(Hong Kong) Tie Ya Na	(South Korea) Cho Eon-Rae (South Korea) Ko Junhyung	(Hong Kong) Tie Ya Na (Hong Kong) Zhang Rui
2006; São Paulo	(South Korea) Cho Eon-Rae	(Japan) Haruna Fukuoka	(Portugal) Tiago Apolónia (Portugal) Joao Monteiro	(South Korea) Lee Eun-Sil (South Korea) Moon Hyun-Jung
2005; Rio de Janeiro	(Romania) Adrian Crişan	(South Korea) Kim Kyung-Ah	(Sweden) Pär Gerell (Sweden) Jens Lundqvist	(Germany) Tanja Hain-Hofmann (Hungary) Georgina Póta
2004; Rio de Janeiro	(Belarus) Vladimir Samsonov	(Austria) Liu Jia	(Germany) Peter Franz (Sweden) Jens Lundqvist	(Hungary) Csilla Bátorfi (Hungary) Krisztina Tóth
2003; Rio de Janeiro	(Chinese Taipei) Chuang Chih-yuan	(Hong Kong) Tie Yana	(Hong Kong) Ko Lai Chak (Hong Kong) Li Ching	(Hong Kong) Lin Ling (Hong Kong) Zhang Rui
2002; São Paulo	(Austria) Werner Schlager	(Japan) Aya Umemura	(Austria) Karl Jindrak (Austria) Werner Schlager	(South Korea) Lee Eun-Sil (South Korea) Suk Eun-Mi
2001; São Paulo	(Germany) Timo Boll	(Japan) Aya Umemura	(Austria) Karl Jindrak (Austria) Werner Schlager	(South Korea) Lee Eun-Sil (South Korea) Shin Soo-Hee
2000; Rio de Janeiro	(China) Liu Guoliang	(China) Wang Nan	(China) Kong Linghui (China) Liu Guoliang	(South Korea) Kim Moo-Kyo (South Korea) Ryu Ji-Hae
1999; Rio de Janeiro	(Croatia) Zoran Primorac	(Chinese Taipei) Chen Jing	(Croatia) Zoran Primorac (Belgium) Jean-Michel Saive	(France) Anne Boileau (France) Anne-Sophie Gourin
1997; Rio de Janeiro	(China) Liu Guoliang	(South Korea) Ryu Ji-Hae	(China) Kong Linghui (China) Liu Guoliang	(South Korea) Lee Eun-Sil (South Korea) Ryu Ji-Hae
1996; Rio de Janeiro	(England) Carl Prean	(Chinese Taipei) Chen Jing	(Japan) Masahiro Hashimoto (Japan) Yoshio Yajima	(Japan) Ryoko Imasaka (Japan) Yoshie Miyake

== Bulgarian Open ==
Year location	Men's singles	Women's singles	Men's doubles	Women's doubles	Mixed doubles
2019; Panagyurishte	(Japan) Harimoto Tomokazu	(China) Chen Xingtong	(South Korea) Jung Young-sik (South Korea) Lee Sang-su	(China) Gu Yuting (China) Mu Zi	(Japan) Jun Mizutani (Japan) Mima Ito
2018; Panagyurishte	(China) Xu Xin	(China) Ding Ning	(China) Ma Long (China) Xu Xin	(Japan) Kasumi Ishikawa (Japan) Mima Ito	
2017	(Germany) Dimitrij Ovtcharov	(Japan) Kasumi Ishikawa	(Japan) Jin Ueda (Japan) Maharu Yoshimura	(Japan) Kasumi Ishikawa (Japan) Mima Ito	
2016	(Czech Republic) Tomáš Konečný	(Japan) Yuka Ishigaki	(Russia) Alexey Liventsov (Russia) Mikhail Paikov	(Japan) Miyu Kato (Japan) Misaki Morizono	
2015	(South Korea) Donghyun Kim	(Japan) Kasumi Ishikawa	(South Korea) Eonrae Cho (South Korea) Donghyun Kim	(South Korea) Jeon Ji-hee (South Korea) Yang Ha-eun	

== Chile Open ==
Year location	Men's singles	Women's singles	Men's doubles	Women's doubles
2017	(India) Soumyajit Ghosh	(Brazil) Caroline Kumahara	(India) Anthony Amalraj (India) Soumyajit Ghosh	(Argentina) Ana Codina (Argentina) Candela Molero
2016	(France) Antoine Hachard	(Switzerland) Rachel Moret	(France) Antoine Hachard (France) Romain Ruiz	(Cuba) Lisi Castillo (Cuba) Idalys Lovet
2015	(Brazil) Thiago Monteiro	(South Korea) Jeon Ji-hee	(Chile) Gustavo Gomez (Chile) Manuel Moya	(Brazil) Leticia Nakada (Brazil) Bruna Takahashi
2014	(Japan) Kohei Sambe	(Japan) Miyu Maeda		
2012; Santiago	(Singapore) Gao Ning	(South Korea) Kim Kyung-Ah	(Singapore) Yang Zi (Singapore) Zhan Jian	(Japan) Hiroko Fujii (Japan) Misako Wakamiya
2011; Santiago	(Chinese Taipei) Chuang Chih-yuan	(Japan) Kasumi Ishikawa	(Argentina) Javier Cillis (Argentina) Liu Song	(Japan) Sayaka Hirano (Japan) Kasumi Ishikawa
2008; Santiago	(South Korea) Ryu Seung-Min	(Singapore) Li Jiawei	(Singapore) Gao Ning (Singapore) Yang Zi	(Hong Kong) Jiang Huajun (Hong Kong) Tie Yana
2007; Santiago	(Japan) Yo Kan	(Hong Kong) Jiang Huajun	(Hong Kong) Ko Lai Chak (Hong Kong) Li Ching	(Hong Kong) Tie Yana (Hong Kong) Zhang Rui
2006; Santiago	(Belarus) Vladimir Samsonov	(South Korea) Park Mi-Young	(Austria) Chen Weixing (Austria) Robert Gardos	(Japan) Hiroko Fujii (Japan) Saki Kanazawa
2005; Santiago	(South Korea) Oh Sang-Eun	(South Korea) Kim Kyung-Ah	(South Korea) Lee Jung-Woo (South Korea) Oh Sang-Eun	(Hong Kong) Tie Yana (Hong Kong) Zhang Rui
2004; Santiago	(Greece) Kalinikos Kreanga	(Italy) Wenling Tan Monfardini	(Croatia) Dragutin Surbek Jr (Czech Republic) Marek Klasek	(Hungary) Csilla Bátorfi (Hungary) Krisztina Tóth

== China Open ==
Year location	Men's singles	Women's singles	Men's doubles	Women's doubles	Mixed doubles
2019; Shenzhen	(China) Ma Long	(China) Chen Meng	(Germany) Timo Boll (Germany) Patrick Franziska	(China) Gu Yuting (China) Liu Shiwen	(Chinese Taipei) Lin Yun-Ju (Chinese Taipei) Cheng I-ching
2018; Shenzhen	(China) Ma Long	(China) Wang Manyu	(China) Fan Zhendong (China) Lin Gaoyuan	(China) Ding Ning (China) Zhu Yuling	(China) Lin Gaoyuan (China) Chen Xingtong
2017; Chengdu	(Germany) Dimitrij Ovtcharov	(China) Ding Ning	(Japan) Jin Ueda (Japan) Maharu Yoshimura	(China) Ding Ning (China) Liu Shiwen	
2016; Chengdu	(China) Fan Zhendong	(China) Ding Ning	(China) Ma Long (China) Zhang Jike	(China) Chen Meng (China) Zhu Yuling	
2015; Chengdu	(China) Ma Long	(China) Zhu Yuling	(China) Fan Zhendong (China) Xu Xin	(China) Chen Meng (China) Liu Shiwen	
2014; Chengdu	(China) Ma Long	(China) Ding Ning	(China) Fan Zhendong (China) Ma Long	(China) Ding Ning (China) Liu Shiwen	
2013; Suzhou	(China) Ma Long	(China) Chen Meng	(China) Ma Long (China) Xu Xin	(China) Chen Meng (China) Zhu Yuling	
2013; Changchun	(China) Ma Long	(China) Li Xiaoxia	(Germany) Timo Boll (China) Ma Long	(China) Guo Yue (China) Liu Shiwen	
2012; Suzhou	(China) Hao Shuai	(China) Chen Meng	(China) Wang Liqin (China) Xu Xin	(China) Chen Meng (China) Zhu Yuling	
2012; Shanghai	(China) Xu Xin	(China) Li Xiaoxia	(China) Ma Long (China) Wang Hao	(Hong Kong) Jiang Huajun (Hong Kong) Lee Ho Ching	
2011; Suzhou	(China) Ma Long	(China) Guo Yan	(China) Ma Lin (China) Zhang Jike	(China) Guo Yan (China) Guo Yue	
2011; Shenzhen	(China) Ma Lin	(China) Wen Jia	(China) Ma Long (China) Wang Hao	(China) Guo Yue (China) Liu Shiwen	
2010; Suzhou	(China) Zhang Jike	(China) Li Xiaoxia	(China) Ma Lin (China) Xu Xin	(China) Guo Yue (China) Li Xiaoxia	
2009; Suzhou	(China) Ma Long	(China) Liu Shiwen	(Japan) Seiya Kishikawa (Japan) Jun Mizutani	(China) Guo Yue (China) Li Xiaoxia	
2009; Tianjin	(China) Wang Hao	(China) Liu Shiwen	(China) Hao Shuai (China) Li Ping	(China) Ding Ning (China) Liu Shiwen	
2008; Shanghai	(China) Hao Shuai	(China) Li Xiaoxia	(China) Ma Lin (China) Wang Liqin	(Hong Kong) Jiang Huajun (Hong Kong) Tie Yana	
2008; Changchun	(China) Wang Hao	(China) Zhang Yining	China^{[1]}	China	
2007; Shenzhen	(China) Wang Hao	(China) Zhang Yining	(China) Ma Lin (China) Wang Hao	(China) Guo Yan (China) Guo Yue	
2007; Nanjing	(China) Ma Lin	(China) Guo Yue	(China) Chen Qi (China) Wang Hao	(China) Guo Yue (China) Li Xiaoxia	
2006; Kunshan	(China) Ma Lin	(China) Wang Nan	(China) Chen Qi (China) Wang Liqin	(China) Wang Nan (China) Zhang Yining	
2006; Guangzhou	(Germany) Timo Boll	(China) Zhang Yining	(China) Hao Shuai (China) Wang Liqin	(Spain) Shen Yanfei (United States) Gao Jun	
2005; Harbin	(China) Wang Liqin	(China) Guo Yue	(China) Kong Linghui (China) Ma Long	(China) Guo Yan (China) Guo Yue	
2005; Shenzhen	(China) Wang Liqin	(China) Li Xiaoxia	(China) Chen Qi (China) Wang Liqin	(China) Guo Yue (China) Zhang Yining	
2004; Changchun	(China) Wang Liqin	(China) Zhang Yining	(China) Kong Linghui (China) Wang Hao	(China) Wang Nan (China) Zhang Yining	
2004; Wuxi	(China) Ma Lin	(China) Cao Zhen	(China) Chen Qi (China) Ma Lin	(China) Cao Zhen (China) Li Xiaoxia	
2003; Guangzhou	(China) Ma Lin	(China) Zhang Yining	(China) Chen Qi (China) Ma Lin	(China) Bai Yang (China) Li Ju	
2002; Qingdao	(China) Wang Liqin	(China) Wang Nan	(South Korea) Lee Chul-Seung (South Korea) Ryu Seung-Min	(South Korea) Lee Eun-Sil (South Korea) Suk Eun-Mi	
2001; Hainan	(China) Wang Liqin	(China) Wang Nan	(China) Wang Liqin (China) Yan Sen	(China) Bai Yang (China) Niu Jianfeng	
2000; Changchun	(China) Wang Liqin	(China) Li Ju	(China) Wang Liqin (China) Yan Sen	(China) Sun Jin (China) Yang Ying	
1999; Guilin	(China) Liu Guozheng	(China) Li Ju	(China) Wang Liqin (China) Yan Sen	(China) Li Nan (China) Lin Ling	
1998; Jinan	(China) Liu Guoliang	(China) Wang Nan	(China) Ma Lin (China) Qin Zhijian	(China) Wu Na (China) Yang Ying	
1997; Zhuhai	(Croatia) Zoran Primorac	(China) Li Ju	(China) Kong Linghui (China) Liu Guoliang	(South Korea) Lee Eun-Sil (South Korea) Ryu Ji-Hae	
1996; Xi'an	(China) Kong Linghui	(China) Wang Chen	(China) Kong Linghui (China) Liu Guoliang	(China) Wang Chen (China) Wu Na	

1. Doubles events were replaced with team events.

== Chinese Taipei Open ==
Year location	Men's singles	Women's singles	Men's doubles	Women's doubles
2007; Taipei	(Belarus) Vladimir Samsonov	(Singapore) Li Jiawei	(Germany) Christian Süß (Germany) Dimitrij Ovtcharov	(Spain) Shen Yanfei (United States) Gao Jun
2006; Taipei	(South Korea) Oh Sang-Eun	(Hong Kong) Tie Ya Na	(South Korea) Lee Jin-Kwon (South Korea) Ryu Seung-Min	(Japan) Ai Fujinuma (Japan) Ai Fukuhara
2005; Taipei	(South Korea) Lee Jung-Woo	(United States) Gao Jun	(Hong Kong) Ko Lai Chak (Hong Kong) Li Ching	(Spain) Shen Yanfei (United States) Gao Jun

== Croatian Open ==
Year location	Men's singles	Women's singles	Men's doubles	Women's doubles
2007; Zagreb	(China) Hao Shuai	(China) Guo Yue	(China) Ma Lin (China) Wang Hao	(China) Chen Qing (China) Li Xiaoxia
2006; Zagreb	(Belarus) Vladimir Samsonov	(China) Guo Yue	(China) Wang Hao (China) Chen Qi	(China) Li Nan (China) Zhang Yining
2005; Zagreb	(Belarus) Vladimir Samsonov	(Hong Kong) Tie Ya Na	(Hong Kong) Ko Lai Chak (Hong Kong) Li Ching	(Hong Kong) Tie Ya Na (Hong Kong) Zhang Rui
2004; Croatia	(Austria) Werner Schlager	(South Korea) Kim Kyung-Ah	(South Korea) Lee Chul-Seung (South Korea) Ryu Seung-Min	(South Korea) Jun Hye-Kyung (South Korea) Kim Moo-Kyo
2003; Croatia	(China) Wang Hao	(China) Zhang Yining	(Hong Kong) Ko Lai Chak (Hong Kong) Li Ching	(China) Wang Nan (China) Zhang Yining
2001; Zagreb	(China) Ma Wenge	(China) Guo Yan	(France) Patrick Chila (France) Jean-Philippe Gatien	(China) Bai Yang (China) Niu Jianfeng
2000; Zagreb	(Belarus) Vladimir Samsonov	(Japan) Chire Koyama	(Chinese Taipei) Chang Yen-Shu (Chinese Taipei) Chiang Peng-Lung	(Chinese Taipei) Chen Jing (Chinese Taipei) Xu Jing
1999; Zagreb	(Belarus) Vladimir Samsonov	(Croatia) Tamara Boros	(France) Patrick Chila (France) Jean-Philippe Gatien	(Germany) Olga Nemes (Germany) Elke Schall
1998; Zagreb	(Belarus) Vladimir Samsonov	(Germany) Jing Tian-Zörner	(Austria) Karl Jindrak (Austria) Werner Schlager	(Hungary) Csilla Bátorfi (Hungary) Krisztina Tóth

== Czech Open ==
Year location	Men's singles	Women's singles	Men's doubles	Women's doubles
2012; Olomouc	(Germany) Christian Suss	(Austria) Liu Jia	(South Korea) Lee Sang-Su (South Korea) Seo Hyun-Deok	(Japan) Hiroko Fujii (Japan) Misako Wakamiya
1999; Prague	(Chinese Taipei) Chiang Peng-Lung	(Romania) Otilia Badescu	(Austria) Karl Jindrak (Austria) Werner Schlager	(Chinese Taipei) Chen Jing (Chinese Taipei) Xu Jing

== Danish Open ==
Year location	Men's singles	Women's singles	Men's doubles	Women's doubles
2009; Frederikshavn	(China) Ma Long	(China) Liu Shiwen	(China) Ma Long (China) Xu Xin	(China) Ding Ning (China) Liu Shiwen
2004; Aarhus	(Denmark) Michael Maze	(Hungary) Krisztina Tóth	(Czech Republic) Petr Korbel (Hong Kong) Leung Chu Yan	(Belarus) Viktoria Pavlovich (Russia) Svetlana Ganina
2003; Aarhus	(China) Ma Lin	(China) Zhang Yining	(China) Ma Lin (China) Wang Hao	(China) Guo Yue (China) Niu Jianfeng
2002; Farum	(China) Ma Lin	(China) Zhang Yining	(China) Qin Zhijian (China) Wang Liqin	(China) Li Nan (China) Zhang Yining
2001; Farum	(China) Ma Lin	(China) Li Jia	(South Korea) Kim Taek-Soo (South Korea) Oh Sang-Eun	(South Korea) Lee Eun-Sil (South Korea) Ryu Ji-Hae
2000; Farum	(China) Wang Liqin	(China) Sun Jin	(Austria) Karl Jindrak (Austria) Werner Schlager	(China) Lin Ling (China) Sun Jin

== Dutch Open ==
Year location	Men's singles	Women's singles	Men's doubles	Women's doubles
2002; Eindhoven	(China) Wang Hao	(China) Niu Jianfeng	(China) Kong Linghui (China) Ma Lin	(China) Li Jia (China) Niu Jianfeng
2001; Rotterdam	(Poland) Tomasz Krzeszewski	(South Korea) Ryu Ji-Hae	(Germany) Timo Boll (Germany) Zoltan Fejer-Konnerth	(China) Bai Yang (China) Niu Jianfeng

== Egypt Open ==
Year location	Men's singles	Women's singles	Men's doubles	Women's doubles
2010; Cairo	(India) Sharath Kamal	(Japan) Yuka Ishigaki	(Hong Kong) Jiang Tianyi (Hong Kong) Leung Chu Yan	(Japan) Sayaka Hirano (Japan) Reiko Hiura
2004; Cairo	(South Korea) Ryu Seung-Min	(South Korea) Lee Eun-Sil	(South Korea) Lee Chul-Seung (South Korea) Ryu Seung-Min	(South Korea) Lee Eun-Sil (South Korea) Suk Eun-Mi
2002; Cairo	(China) Wang Hao	(China) Li Nan	(Hong Kong) Ko Lai Chak (Hong Kong) Li Ching	(China) Li Nan (China) Li Jia

== English Open ==
Year location	Men's singles	Women's singles	Men's doubles	Women's doubles
2011; Sheffield	(China) Chen Qi	(China) Ding Ning	(China) Xu Xin (China) Zhang Jike	(China) Guo Yue (China) Guo Yan
2009; Sheffield	(China) Ma Long	(China) Guo Yan	(China) Ma Long (China) Wang Liqin	(South Korea) Kim Kyung-Ah (South Korea) Park Mi-Young
2001; Chatham	(China) Wang Liqin	(Japan) Yoshie Takada	(Germany) Timo Boll (Germany) Zoltan Fejer-Konnerth	(North Korea) Kim Hyang-Mi (North Korea) Kim Hyon-Hui
1999; Hopton-on-Sea	(China) Ma Wenge	(Germany) Jie Schöpp	(Netherlands) Danny Heister (Netherlands) Trinko Keen	(South Korea) Lee Eun-Sil (South Korea) Ryu Ji-Hae
1997; Kettering	(Belgium) Jean-Michel Saive	(Chinese Taipei) Chen-Tong Fei-Ming	(France) Patrick Chila (France) Christophe Legout	(Hong Kong) Chai Po Wa (China) Qiao Yunping
1996; Kettering	(China) Kong Linghui	(China) Yang Ying	(Austria) Karl Jindrak (Austria) Werner Schlager	(China) Wang Hui (China) Yang Ying

== French Open ==
Year location	Men's singles	Women's singles	Men's doubles	Women's doubles
2007; Toulouse	(China) Ma Lin	(China) Zhang Yining	(China) Ma Lin (China) Wang Hao	(China) Guo Yan (China) Wang Nan
2000; Toulouse	(Chinese Taipei) Chiang Peng-Lung	(Romania) Mihaela Ioana Steff Merutiu	(Chinese Taipei) Chang Yen-Shu (Chinese Taipei) Chiang Peng-Lung	(Italy) Alessia Arisi (Romania) Mihaela Ioana Steff Merutiu
1999; Liévin	(China) Kong Linghui	(Chinese Taipei) Chen Jing	(China) Kong Linghui (China) Ma Lin	(China) Li Nan (China) Lin Ling
1997; Lyon	(France) Christophe Legout	(China) Cheng Hongxia	(Poland) Lucjan Blaszczyk (Poland) Tomasz Krzeszewski	(China) Cheng Hongxia (China) Wang Hui
1996; Lyon	(Sweden) Jan-Ove Waldner	(China) Deng Yaping	(China) Wang Liqin (China) Yan Sen	(China) Deng Yaping (China) Yang Ying

== German Open ==
Year location	Men's singles	Women's singles	Men's doubles	Women's doubles
2018; Bremen	(China) Ma Long	(Japan) Kasumi Ishikawa	(China) Ma Long (China) Xu Xin	(Japan) Hina Hayata (Japan) Mima Ito
2017; Magdeburg	(Germany) Dimitrij Ovtcharov	(China) Chen Meng	(South Korea) Jung Young-sik (South Korea) Lee Sang-su	(Japan) Hina Hayata (Japan) Miu Hirano
2016; Berlin	(China) Ma Long	(China) Wu Yang	(Japan) Masataka Morizono (Japan) Yuya Oshima	(South Korea) Jeon Ji-hee (South Korea) Yang Ha-eun
2015; Bremen	(China) Ma Long	(Japan) Mima Ito	(Germany) Timo Boll (Germany) Patrick Franziska	(Germany) Petrissa Solja (Germany) Shan Xiaona
2014; Magdeburg	(Germany) Dimitrij Ovtcharov	(Germany) Shan Xiaona	(China) Wang Hao (China) Lyu Xiang	(Japan) Mima Ito (Japan) Miu Hirano
2013; Berlin	(China) Fan Zhendong	(China) Wen Jia	(Germany) Timo Boll (Germany) Patrick Franziska	(China) Wen Jia (China) Zhào Yán
2012; Bremen	(Germany) Dimitrij Ovtcharov	(Spain) Shen Yanfei	(Hong Kong) Jiang Tianyi (Hong Kong) Wong Chun Ting	(Germany) Petrissa Solja (Germany) Sabine Winter
2011; Dortmund	(China) Zhang Jike	(China) Guo Yan	(China) Hao Shuai (China) Zhang Jike	(China) Guo Yue (China) Li Xiaoxia
2010; Berlin	(China) Ma Long	(China) Feng Yalan	(China) Chen Qi (China) Ma Long	(Japan) Ai Fukuhara (Japan) Kasumi Ishikawa
2009; Bremen	(Germany) Timo Boll	(Japan) Sayaka Hirano	(Germany) Timo Boll (Germany) Christian Süß	(China) Li Xiaodan (China) Mu Zi
2008; Berlin	(Germany) Timo Boll	(Austria) Liu Jia	Poland^{[1]}	Singapore
2007; Bremen	(China) Ma Long	(China) Li Xiaoxia	(China) Wang Hao (China) Wang Liqin	(China) Guo Yue (China) Li Xiaoxia
2006; Bayreuth	(Germany) Timo Boll	(Singapore) Wang Yuegu	(Austria) Werner Schlager (France) Patrick Chila	(Singapore) Li Jiawei (Singapore) Sun Beibei
2005; Magdeburg	(Belarus) Vladimir Samsonov	(China) Cao Zhen	(South Korea) Lee Jung-Woo (South Korea) Oh Sang-Eun	(Hong Kong) Tie Yana (Hong Kong) Zhang Rui
2004; Leipzig	(Germany) Timo Boll	(China) Niu Jianfeng	(Germany) Timo Boll (Germany) Christian Süß	(China) Guo Yue (China) Niu Jianfeng
2003; Bremen	(China) Wang Liqin	(China) Zhang Yining	(Hong Kong) Ko Lai Chak (Hong Kong) Li Ching	(China) Wang Nan (China) Zhang Yining
2002; Magdeburg	(China) Ma Lin	(Croatia) Tamara Boroš	(China) Kong Linghui (China) Ma Lin	(China) Li Jia (China) Niu Jianfeng
2001; Bayreuth	(Belarus) Vladimir Samsonov	(South Korea) Ryu Ji-Hae	(Federal Republic of Yugoslavia) Slobodan Grujić (Federal Republic of Yugoslavia) Aleksandar Karakašević	(South Korea) Kim Bok-Rae (South Korea) Kim Kyung-Ah
1999; Bremen	(China) Liu Guoliang	(China) Wang Nan	(Chinese Taipei) Chiang Peng-Lung (Chinese Taipei) Chang Yen-Shu	(Hungary) Csilla Bátorfi (Hungary) Krisztina Tóth

1. Doubles events were replaced with team events.

== Greek Open ==
Year location	Men's singles	Women's singles	Men's doubles	Women's doubles
2004; Athens	(China) Wang Hao	(China) Wang Nan	(China) Chen Qi (China) Ma Lin	(China) Guo Yue (China) Niu Jianfeng

== Hungarian Open ==
Year location	Men's singles	Women's singles	Men's doubles	Women's doubles
2016; Budapest	(Chinese Taipei) Chuang Chih-Yuan	(Hong Kong) Tie Ya Na	(Chinese Taipei) Chuang Chih-Yuan (Chinese Taipei) Huang Sheng-Sheng	(South Korea) Jeon Jihee (South Korea) Yang Ha-Eun
2015; Budapest	(Hong Kong) Jiang Tianyi	(Japan) Misako Wakamiya	(South Korea) Jeong Sang-Eun (South Korea) Lee Sang-Su	(Austria) Sofia Polcanova (Austria) Amelie Solja
2014; Szombathely	(Austria) Daniel Habesohn	(Austria) Liu Jia		
2012; Budapest	(China) Ma Long	(China) Liu Shiwen	(China) Ma Lin (China) Chen Qi	(China) Liu Shiwen (China) Ding Ning
2010; Budaörs	(Japan) Jun Mizutani	(Hong Kong) Tie Ya Na	(Japan) Kenta Matsudaira (Japan) Koki Niwa	(Japan) Ai Fukuhara (Japan) Kasumi Ishikawa

== Indian Open ==
Year location	Men's singles	Women's singles	Men's doubles	Women's doubles
2010; New Delhi	(Germany) Dimitrij Ovtcharov	(Japan) Sayaka Hirano	(South Korea) Lee Sang-Su (South Korea) Seo Hyun-Deok	(Chinese Taipei) Cheng I-Ching (Chinese Taipei) Huang Yi-Hua
2009; Indore	(Singapore) Ma Liang	(Singapore) Yu Mengyu	(Singapore) Gao Ning (Singapore) Yang Zi	(Malaysia) Beh Lee Wei (Malaysia) Ng Sock Khim
2007; New Delhi	(Singapore) Gao Ning	(Singapore) Sun Beibei	(Singapore) Gao Ning (Singapore) Yang Zi	(Singapore) Sun Beibei (Singapore) Yu Mengyu

== Italian Open ==
Year location	Men's singles	Women's singles	Men's doubles	Women's doubles
2002; Courmayeur	(Sweden) Peter Karlsson	(Hong Kong) Lin Ling	(Hong Kong) Ko Lai Chak (Hong Kong) Li Ching	(South Korea) Ryu Ji-Hae (Japan) Aya Umemura
1998; Courmayeur	(China) Liu Guoliang	(China) Zhang Yining	(France) Patrick Chila (France) Jean-Philippe Gatien	(China) Wu Na (China) Yang Ying
1996; Bolzano	(Belarus) Vladimir Samsonov	(China) Li Ju	(France) Patrick Chila (France) Christophe Legout	(China) Cheng Hongxia (China) Wang Hui

== Japan Open ==
Year location	Men's singles	Women's singles	Men's doubles	Women's doubles	Mixed doubles
2019; Sapporo	(China) Xu Xin	(China) Sun Yingsha	(China) Fan Zhendong (China) Xu Xin	(China) Liu Shiwen (China) Chen Meng	(China) Xu Xin (China) Zhu Yuling
2018; Kitakyushu	(Japan) Tomokazu Harimoto	(Japan) Mima Ito	(South Korea) Jung Young-sik (South Korea) Lee Sang-su	(China) Gu Yuting (China) Mu Zi	(China) Liang Jingkun (China) Chen Xingtong
2017; Tokyo	(China) Ma Long	(China) Sun Yingsha	(China) Ma Long (China) Xu Xin	(China) Chen Xingtong (China) Sun Yingsha	
2016; Tokyo	(China) Fan Zhendong	(China) Liu Shiwen	(China) Ma Long (China) Xu Xin	(China) Ding Ning (China) Li Xiaoxia	
2015; Kobe	(China) Xu Xin	(China) Chen Meng	(China) Ma Long (China) Xu Xin	(China) Liu Fei (China) Wu Yang	
2014; Yokohama	(China) Yu Ziyang	(Singapore) Feng Tianwei	(Japan) Seiya Kishikawa (Japan) Jun Mizutani	(Japan) Ai Fukuhara (Japan) Misaki Wakamiya	
2013; Yokohama	(Japan) Masato Shiono	(Japan) Ai Fukuhara	(Japan) Jin Ueda (Japan) Maharu Yoshimura	(China) Gu Yuting (China) Zhou Xintong	
2012; Kobe	(Japan) Jun Mizutani	(Spain) Shen Yanfei	(South Korea) Kim Min-Seok (South Korea) Seo Hyun-Deok	(Japan) Hiroko Fujii (Japan) Misako Wakamiya	
2011; Kobe	(Japan) Seiya Kishikawa	(Singapore) Feng Tianwei	(China) Lin Gaoyuan (China) Wu Jiaji	(Japan) Hiroko Fujii (Japan) Misako Wakamiya	
2010; Kobe	(Germany) Timo Boll	(Singapore) Wang Yuegu	(Japan) Kenta Matsudaira (Japan) Koki Niwa	(Japan) Yuka Ishigaki (Japan) Yuri Yamanashi	
2009; Wakayama	(South Korea) Oh Sang-Eun	(South Korea) Park Mi-Young	(Japan) Seiya Kishikawa (Japan) Jun Mizutani	(Japan) Sayaka Hirano (Japan) Reiko Hiura	
2008; Yokohama	(China) Ma Lin	(China) Zhang Yining	China^{[1]}	China	
2007; Chiba	(China) Wang Hao	(China) Wang Nan	(China) Chen Qi (China) Wang Liqin	(China) Guo Yue (China) Li Xiaoxia	
2006; Yokohama	(China) Wang Liqin	(Singapore) Wang Yuegu	(China) Ma Lin (China) Wang Hao	(Hong Kong) Tie Yana (Hong Kong) Zhang Rui	
2005; Yokohama	(Germany) Timo Boll	(China) Zhang Yining	(Germany) Timo Boll (Germany) Christian Süß	(China) Bai Yang (China) Cao Zhen	
2004; Kobe	(China) Chen Qi	(China) Zhang Yining	(China) Wang Liqin (China) Yan Sen	(China) Guo Yue (China) Niu Jianfeng	
2003; Kobe	(Germany) Timo Boll	(China) Guo Yue	(China) Chen Qi (China) Ma Lin	(China) Guo Yue (China) Niu Jianfeng	
2002; Kobe	(Greece) Kalinikos Kreanga	(South Korea) Kim Kyung-Ah	(Japan) Akira Kito (Japan) Toshio Tasaki	(Singapore) Jing Junhong (Singapore) Li Jiawei	
2001; Yokohama	(Chinese Taipei) Chiang Peng-Lung	(China) Wang Nan	(China) Ma Lin (China) Wang Hao	(South Korea) Kim Bok-Rae (South Korea) Kim Kyung-Ah	
2000; Kobe	(China) Wang Liqin	(China) Wang Nan	(China) Kong Linghui (China) Liu Guoliang	(China) Sun Jin (China) Yang Ying	
1999; Kobe	(Belarus) Vladimir Samsonov	(China) Wang Nan	(China) Ma Lin (China) Qin Zhijian	(China) Sun Jin (China) Yang Ying	
1998; Wakayama	(China) Kong Linghui	(China) Li Ju	(China) Ma Lin (China) Wang Tao	(China) Li Ju (China) Wang Nan	
1997; Chiba	(Sweden) Jan-Ove Waldner	(China) Wang Chen	(China) Wang Liqin (China) Yan Sen	(South Korea) Lee Eun-Sil (South Korea) Ryu Ji-Hae	
1996; Kitaku-Shu	(China) Ding Song	(China) Qiao Hong	(South Korea) Kang Hee-Chan (South Korea) Kim Taek-Soo	(South Korea) Park Hae-Jung (South Korea) Ryu Ji-Hae	

1. Doubles events were replaced with team events.

== Korea Open ==
Year location	Men's singles	Women's singles	Men's doubles	Women's doubles	Mixed doubles
2019; Busan	(China) Xu Xin	(China) Chen Meng	(China) Fan Zhendong (China) Xu Xin	(China) Chen Meng (China) Wang Manyu	(Hong Kong) Wong Chun Ting (Hong Kong) Doo Hoi-Kem
2018; Deajeon	(South Korea) Jang Woo-jin	(China) Zhu Yuling	(South Korea) Jang Woo-jin (South Korea) Lim Jong-hoon	(China) Chen Meng (China) Ding Ning	(South Korea) Jang Woo-jin (North Korea) Cha Hyo Sim
2017; Incheon	(Germany) Timo Boll	(Singapore) Feng Tianwei	(South Korea) Jang Woo-jin (South Korea) Jeong Sang-eun	(Germany) Shan Xiaona (Germany) Petrissa Solja	
2016; Incheon	(China) Xu Xin	(China) Ding Ning	(China) Xu Xin (China) Zhang Jike	(China) Ding Ning (China) Liu Shiwen	
2015; Incheon	(South Korea) Jung Young-Sik	(Japan) Ai Fukuhara	(South Korea) Jung Young-Sik (South Korea) Kim Min-Seok	(Japan) Miu Hirano (Japan) Mima Ito	
2014; Incheon	(China) Xu Xin	(Germany) Han Ying	(China) Yu Ziyang (China) Zhou Kai	(China) Chen Ke (China) Wang Manyu	
2013; Incheon	(China) Xu Xin	(South Korea) Seo Hyo-Won	(South Korea) Seo Hyun-Deok (China) Zhang Jike	(South Korea) Park Young-Sook (South Korea) Yang Ha-Eun	
2012; Incheon	(China) Zhang Jike	(China) Liu Shiwen	(China) Ma Long (China) Xu Xin	(China) Ding Ning (China) Liu Shiwen	
2011; Incheon	(Germany) Dimitrij Ovtcharov	(Singapore) Feng Tianwei	(China) Song Hongyuan (China) Jin Yixiong	(Japan) Misako Wakamiya (Japan) Hiroko Fujii	
2010; Incheon	(Belarus) Vladimir Samsonov	(Spain) Shen Yanfei	(Germany) Patrick Baum (Germany) Bastian Steger	(South Korea) Kim Kyung-Ah (South Korea) Park Mi-Young	
2009; Seoul	(Japan) Jun Mizutani	(Singapore) Feng Tianwei	(China) Hao Shuai (China) Wang Hao	(South Korea) Kim Kyung-Ah (South Korea) Park Mi-Young	
2008; Daejeon	(China) Ma Long	(China) Guo Yue	(China) Wang Hao (China) Wang Liqin	(China) Guo Yue (China) Liu Shiwen	
2007; Seongnam	(South Korea) Oh Sang-Eun	(Hong Kong) Jiang Huajun	(South Korea) Lee Jung-Woo (South Korea) Oh Sang-Eun	(Spain) Shen Yanfei (United States) Gao Jun	
2006; Jeonju	(South Korea) Joo Se-Hyuk	(Hong Kong) Tie Yana	(Hong Kong) Cheung Yuk (Hong Kong) Leung Chu Yan	(Hong Kong) Tie Yana (Hong Kong) Zhang Rui	
2005; Suncheon	(South Korea) Oh Sang-Eun	(South Korea) Kim Kyung-Ah	(South Korea) Lee Jung-Woo (South Korea) Ryu Seung-Min	(Singapore) Tan Paey Fern (Singapore) Zhang Xueling	
2004; Pyeongchang	(China) Wang Liqin	(China) Zhang Yining	(China) Kong Linghui (China) Wang Hao	(China) Wang Nan (China) Zhang Yining	
2003; Jeju City	(China) Ma Lin	(China) Guo Yan	(China) Chen Qi (China) Ma Lin	(China) Guo Yue (China) Niu Jianfeng	
2002; Gangneung	(Austria) Werner Schlager	(Hong Kong) Tie Yana	(South Korea) Kim Taek-Soo (South Korea) Oh Sang-Eun	(China) Bai Yang (China) Guo Yan	
2001; Seoul	(South Korea) Kim Taek-Soo	(China) Wang Nan	(China) Kong Linghui (China) Liu Guoliang	(China) Gao Xi (China) Li Jia	

== Kuwait Open ==
Year location	Men's singles	Women's singles	Men's doubles	Women's doubles
2012; Kuwait City	(Japan) Jun Mizutani	(China) Feng Yalan	(Singapore) Gao Ning (Singapore) Li Hu	(China) Chen Meng (China) Zhu Yuling
2010; Kuwait City	(China) Xu Xin	(China) Liu Shiwen	(China) Ma Long (China) Zhang Jike	(China) Guo Yan (China) Guo Yue
2009; Kuwait City	(China) Ma Long	(China) Ding Ning	(China) Chen Qi (China) Ma Lin	(China) Guo Yue (China) Zhang Yining
2008; Kuwait City	(Belarus) Vladimir Samsonov	(China) Zhang Yining	(China) Ma Lin (China) Wang Hao	(China) Wang Nan (China) Zhang Yining
2007; Kuwait City	(China) Ma Long	(China) Guo Yue	(South Korea) Lee Jin-Kwon (South Korea) Ryu Seung-Min	(China) Li Xiaoxia (China) Zhang Yining
2006; Kuwait City	(China) Ma Lin	(Hong Kong) Jiang Huajun	(China) Chen Qi (China) Ma Lin	(China) Wang Nan (China) Zhang Yining

== Lebanon Open ==
Year location	Men's singles	Women's singles	Men's doubles	Women's doubles
1998; Beirut	(China) Wang Liqin	(China) Yang Ying	(China) Ma Lin (China) Qin Zhijian	(China) Wu Na (China) Yang Ying
1997; Beirut		(China) Wang Nan		(China) Li Ju (China) Wang Nan

== Malaysia Open ==
Year location	Men's singles	Women's singles	Men's doubles	Women's doubles
2003; Johor Bahru	(China) Liu Guozheng	(China) Cao Zhen	(China) Kong Linghui (China) Liu Guozheng	(China) Cao Zhen (China) Peng Luyang
1998; Kota Kinabalu	(China) Ma Lin	(China) Zhang Yining	(China) Kong Linghui (China) Liu Guoliang	(China) Wang Chen (China) Zhang Yining
1997; Ipoh	(China) Kong Linghui	(China) Deng Yaping	(China) Ma Lin (China) Yan Sen	(South Korea) Kim Moo-Kyo (South Korea) Park Hae-Jung

== Morocco Open ==
Year location	Men's singles	Women's singles	Men's doubles	Women's doubles
2011; Rabat	(Belarus) Vladimir Samsonov	(South Korea) Jeon Ji-Hee	(Spain) Jesus Cantero (Spain) Marc Duran	(Singapore) Sun Beibei (Singapore) Yu Mengyu
2010; Rabat	(Belarus) Vladimir Samsonov	(Japan) Kasumi Ishikawa	(Egypt) Omar Assar (Egypt) El-Sayed Lashin	(Japan) Reiko Hiura (Japan) Kasumi Ishikawa
2009; Rabat	(Belarus) Vladimir Samsonov	(Japan) Ai Fukuhara	(France) Loic Bobillier (France) Armand Phung	(Japan) Ai Fukuhara (Japan) Kasumi Ishikawa

== Polish Open ==
Year location	Men's singles	Women's singles	Men's doubles	Women's doubles
2012; Poznań	(China) Wang Hao	(China) Ding Ning	(Japan) Kenta Matsudaira (Japan) Koki Niwa	(Chinese Taipei) Cheng I-Ching (Chinese Taipei) Huang Yi-Hua
2011; Wladyslawowo	(South Korea) Lee Sang Su	(China) Wu Yang	(Sweden) Mattias Karlsson (Sweden) Robert Svensson	(China) Guo Yue (China) Li Xiaodan
2010; Warsaw	(Belarus) Vladimir Samsonov	(Netherlands) Li Jiao	(Portugal) Marcos Freitas (Croatia) Andrej Gacina	(Japan) Haruna Fukuoka (Japan) Reiko Hiura
2009; Warsaw	(Germany) Timo Boll	(China) Fan Ying	(South Korea) Kim Jung-Hoon (South Korea) Oh Sang-Eun	(China) Fan Ying (China) Wu Yang
2008; Warsaw	(Germany) Timo Boll	(Singapore) Feng Tianwei	(Poland) Lucjan Blaszczyk (Poland) Wang Zeng Yi	(Romania) Daniela Dodean (Romania) Elizabeta Samara
2006; Warsaw	(Germany) Timo Boll	(Poland) Li Qian	(Poland) Lucjan Blaszczyk (Poland) Wang Zeng Yi	(Japan) Sayaka Hirano (Japan) Reiko Hiura
2004; Warsaw	(Germany) Timo Boll	(Hong Kong) Lau Sui Fei	(Germany) Timo Boll (Germany) Christian Suss	(Japan) An Konishi (Netherlands) Li Jiao
2002; Warsaw	(China) Ma Lin	(China) Zhang Yining	(China) Qin Zhijian (China) Wang Liqin	(China) Li Nan (China) Zhang Yining
2000; Warsaw	(China) Liu Guozheng	(China) Zhang Yining	(China) Liu Guozheng (China) Ma Lin	(China) Zhang Yingying (China) Zhang Yining
1997; Gdańsk	(Canada) Wenguan Johnny Huang	(Germany) Jing Tian-Zörner	(Austria) Karl Jindrak (Austria) Werner Schlager	(Luxembourg) Ni Xialian (Luxembourg) Peggy Regenwetter

== Qatar Open ==
Year location	Men's singles	Women's singles	Men's doubles	Women's doubles
2019; Doha	(China) Ma Long	(China) Wang Manyu	(Hong Kong) Ho Kwan Kit (Hong Kong) Wong ChunTing	(China) Wang Manyu (China) Sun Yingsha
2018; Doha	(China) Fan Zhendong	(China) Liu Shiwen	(China) Fan Zhendong (China) Xu Xin	(China) Chen Ke (China) Wang Manyu
2017; Doha	(China) Ma Long	(China) Chen Meng	(Japan) Masataka Morizono (Japan) Yuya Oshima	(China) Chen Meng (China) Wang Manyu
2016; Doha	(China) Ma Long	(China) Liu Shiwen	(China) Fan Zhendong (China) Zhang Jike	(China) Ding Ning (China) Liu Shiwen
2015; Doha	(Belarus) Vladimir Samsonov	(Romania) Elizabeta Samara	(Portugal) Marcos Freitas (Croatia) Andrej Gaćina	(Hong Kong) Jiang Huajun (Hong Kong) Tie Ya Na
2014; Doha	(China) Xu Xin	(China) Hu Limei	(South Korea) Cho Eon-rae (South Korea) Joo Sae-hyuk	(Hong Kong) Lee Ho Ching (Hong Kong) Ng Wing Nam
2013; Doha	(China) Ma Long	(China) Ding Ning	(China) Wang Hao (China) Yan An	(China) Ding Ning (China) Li Xiaoxia
2012; Doha	(China) Xu Xin	(China) Chen Meng	(China) Ma Lin (China) Xu Xin	(China) Li Xiaodan (China) Wen Jia
2011; Doha	(China) Xu Xin	(China) Liu Shiwen	(China) Wang Liqin (China) Xu Xin	(China) Guo Yue (China) Li Xiaoxia
2010; Doha	(China) Wang Liqin	(China) Guo Yue	(China) Ma Lin (China) Wang Hao	(China) Ding Ning (China) Liu Shiwen
2009; Doha	(Germany) Timo Boll	(China) Zhang Yining	(China) Ma Long (China) Xu Xin	(China) Guo Yue (China) Zhang Yining
2008; Doha	(China) Ma Lin	(China) Zhang Yining	(China) Chen Qi (China) Ma Lin	(China) Guo Yue (China) Zhang Yining
2007; Doha	(China) Ma Lin	(China) Li Xiaoxia	(South Korea) Cho Eon-Rae (South Korea) Lee Jung-Woo	(China) Li Xiaoxia (China) Wang Nan
2006; Doha	(China) Wang Liqin	(China) Zhang Yining	(China) Wang Hao (China) Wang Liqin	(China) Wang Nan (China) Zhang Yining
2005; Doha	(China) Wang Liqin	(China) Zhang Yining	(China) Kong Linghui (China) Wang Hao	(China) Guo Yue (China) Niu Jianfeng
2003; Doha	(Belarus) Vladimir Samsonov	(Croatia) Tamara Boros	(Greece) Kalinikos Kreanga (Germany) Jörg Roßkopf	(Belarus) Tatyana Logatzkaya (Belarus) Veronika Pavlovich
2002; Doha	(Belgium) Jean-Michel Saive	(China) Wang Nan	(China) Wang Liqin (China) Yan Sen	(China) Li Jia (China) Niu Jianfeng
2001; Doha	(Croatia) Zoran Primorac	(North Korea) Kim Hyon-Hui	(Chinese Taipei) Chang Yen-Shu (Chinese Taipei) Chiang Peng-Lung	(South Korea) Kim Moo-Kyo (South Korea) Ryu Ji-Hae
1999; Doha	(Croatia) Zoran Primorac	(Germany) Jing Tian-Zörner	(Chinese Taipei) Chang Yen-Shu (Chinese Taipei) Chiang Peng-Lung	(Hungary) Csilla Bátorfi (Hungary) Krisztina Tóth
1998; Doha	(Croatia) Zoran Primorac	(China) Li Ju	(China) Wang Liqin (China) Yan Sen	(China) Li Ju (China) Wang Nan
1997; Doha	(Sweden) Jan-Ove Waldner		(Japan) Koji Matsushita (Japan) Hiroshi Shibutani	

== Russian Open ==
Year location	Men's singles	Women's singles	Men's doubles	Women's doubles
2012; Ekaterinburg	(China) Xu Xin	(China) Feng Yalan	(China) Fang Bo (China) Xu Xin	(China) Chang Chenchen (China) Rao Jingwen
2007; Saint Petersburg	(China) Chen Qi	(China) Chang Chenchen	(Hong Kong) Ko Lai Chak (Hong Kong) Li Ching	(China) Li Nan (China) Peng Luyang
2006; Saint Petersburg	(China) Hou Yingchao	(Singapore) Li Jiawei	(China) Hou Yingchao (Dominican Republic) Lin Ju	(Singapore) Li Jiawei (Singapore) Sun Beibei
2005; Saint Petersburg	(Belarus) Vladimir Samsonov	(Hungary) Krisztina Tóth	(Austria) Werner Schlager (Serbia and Montenegro) Aleksandar Karakašević	(Hungary) Georgina Póta (Hungary) Krisztina Tóth
2004; Saint Petersburg	(Greece) Kalinikos Kreanga	(Hong Kong) Tie Ya Na	(Greece) Peter Franz (Greece) Kalinikos Kreanga	(Hong Kong) Song Ah Sim (Hong Kong) Tie Ya Na

== Serbian Open ==
Year location	Men's singles	Women's singles	Men's doubles	Women's doubles
2006; Belgrade	(Japan) Kaii Yoshida	(Japan) Sayaka Hirano	(Romania) Mihai Andrei Filimon (Serbia) Aleksandar Karakašević	(Italy) Nikoleta Stefanova (Italy) Wenling Tan Monfardini
1998; Belgrade	(Sweden) Jörgen Persson	(China) Lin Ling	(China) Ma Lin (China) Qin Zhijian	(China) Lin Ling (China) Sun Jin
1997; Belgrade	(China) Liu Guoliang	(China) Niu Jianfeng	(China) Wang Liqin (China) Yan Sen	(China) Cheng Hongxia (China) Wang Hui
1996; Belgrade	(Sweden) Jan-Ove Waldner	(China) Li Ju	(Sweden) Thomas Von Scheele (Sweden) Jan-Ove Waldner	(China) Li Ju (China) Wang Nan

== Singapore Open ==
Year location	Men's singles	Women's singles	Men's doubles	Women's doubles
2008; Singapore	(China) Ma Long	(China) Li Xiaoxia	(China) Chen Qi (China) Li Ping	(Singapore) Li Jiawei (Singapore) Sun Beibei
2006; Singapore	(China) Ma Lin	(China) Zhang Yining	(China) Chen Qi (China) Ma Lin	(China) Wang Nan (China) Zhang Yining
2004; Singapore	(China) Wang Liqin	(China) Zhang Yining	(China) Chen Qi (China) Ma Lin	(China) Guo Yue (China) Niu Jianfeng

== Spanish Open ==
Year location	Men's singles	Women's singles	Men's doubles	Women's doubles
2012; Almería	(Chinese Taipei) Chuang Chih-Yuan	(South Korea) Kim Kyung-Ah	(Japan) Kenji Matsudaira (Japan) Jun Mizutani	(South Korea) Kim Kyung-Ah (South Korea) Park Mi-Young
2011; Almería	(South Korea) Oh Sang-Eun	(Japan) Sayaka Hirano	(South Korea) Lee Jung-Woo (South Korea) Oh Sang-Eun	(Hong Kong) Jiang Huajun (Hong Kong) Tie Ya Na

== Slovenian Open ==
Year location	Men's singles	Women's singles	Men's doubles	Women's doubles
2012; Velenje	(China) Zhang Jike	(China) Ding Ning	(China) Ma Long (China) Zhang Jike	(China) Ding Ning (China) Guo Yan
2011; Velenje	(China) Xu Xin	(China) Wu Yang	(China) Wang Hao (China) Zhang Jike	(China) Guo Yue (China) Li Xiaoxia
2010; Velenje	(South Korea) Lee Sang-Su	(Poland) Li Qian	(Russia) Alexander Shibaev (Russia) Alexey Smirnov	(Belarus) Viktoria Pavlovich (Russia) Svetlana Ganina
2009; Velenje	(China) Hao Shuai	(China) Cao Zhen	(China) Xu Xin (China) Zhang Chao	(China) Cao Zhen (China) Fan Ying
2008; Velenje	(Belarus) Vladimir Samsonov	(Netherlands) Li Jiao	(Chinese Taipei) Chang Yen-Shu (Chinese Taipei) Chiang Peng-Lung	(Russia) Irina Kotikhina (Netherlands) Li Jie
2007; Velenje	(China) Wang Hao	(China) Guo Yue	(China) Chen Qi (China) Wang Liqin	(China) Guo Yan (China) Zhang Yining
2006; Velenje	(China) Wang Hao	(China) Guo Yue	(China) Hao Shuai (China) Ma Long	(China) Guo Yue (China) Li Xiaoxia
2005; Velenje	(Russia) Fedor Kuzmin	(Singapore) Li Jiawei	(Hong Kong) Ko Lai Chak (Hong Kong) Li Ching	(Hong Kong) Tie Ya Na (Hong Kong) Zhang Rui

== Swedish Open ==
Year location	Men's singles	Women's singles	Men's doubles	Women's doubles
2018; Stockholm	(China) Fan Zhendong	(Japan) Mima Ito	(Chinese Taipei) Liao Cheng-ting (Chinese Taipei) Lin Yun-Ju	(China) Chen Xingtong (China) Sun Yingsha
2017; Stockholm	(China) Xu Xin	(China) Chen Xingtong	(China) Fan Zhendong (China) Xu Xin	(Japan) Hina Hayata (Japan) Mima Ito
2016; Stockholm	(Japan) Yuya Oshima	(Japan) Kasumi Ishikawa	(Brazil) Hugo Calderano (Brazil) Gustavo Tsuboi	(Chinese Taipei) Cheng I-ching (Chinese Taipei) Lee I-chen
2015; Stockholm	(China) Fan Zhendong	(China) Mu Zi	(China) Fang Bo (China) Xu Xin	(China) Chen Meng (China) Mu Zi
2014; Stockholm	(China) Fan Zhendong	(China) Zhu Yuling	(China) Wang Hao (China) Yan An	(China) Liu Shiwen (China) Zhu Yuling
2013; Stockholm	(China) Yan An	(China) Chen Meng	(Sweden) Jens Lundqvist (China) Xu Xin	(China) Li Xiaodan (China) Mu Zi
2012; Stockholm	(Sweden) Hampus Nordberg	(North Korea) Kim Song-i		
2011; Stockholm	(China) Ma Long	(China) Guo Yan	(China) Wang Liqin (China) Yan An	(China) Guo Yan (China) Guo Yue
2007; Stockholm	(China) Wang Hao	(China) Li Xiaoxia	(China) Ma Long (China) Wang Hao	(South Korea) Kim Kyung-Ah (South Korea) Park Mi-Young
2005; Gothenburg	(Germany) Timo Boll	(China) Cao Zhen	(South Korea) Oh Sang-Eun (South Korea) Lee Jung-Woo	(Hong Kong) Tie Ya Na (Hong Kong) Zhang Rui
2003; Malmö	(China) Wang Liqin	(China) Zhang Yining	(China) Wang Hao (China) Ma Lin	(China) Guo Yue (China) Niu Jianfeng
2001; Skövde	(China) Wang Liqin	(China) Guo Yan	(China) Wang Liqin (China) Yan Sen	(China) Bai Yang (China) Yang Ying
2000; Umeå	(China) Liu Guozheng	(China) Zhang Yining	(China) Liu Guozheng (China) Ma Lin	(China) Bai Yang (China) Niu Jianfeng
1999; Karlskrona	(China) Wang Liqin	(China) Sun Jin	(France) Patrick Chila (France) Jean-Philippe Gatien	(China) Sun Jin (China) Yang Ying
1998; Sundsvall	(France) Damien Eloi	(Germany) Qianhong Gotsch-He	(China) Ma Lin (China) Qin Zhijian	(China) Lin Ling (China) Sun Jin
1997; Kalmar	(Belarus) Vladimir Samsonov	(China) Wang Hui	(Poland) Lucjan Blaszczyk (Poland) Tomasz Krzeszewski	(South Korea) Kim Moo-Kyo (South Korea) Park Hae-Jung
1996; Borås	(Sweden) Jörgen Persson	(China) Deng Yaping	(China) Ma Wenge (China) Wang Tao	(China) Deng Yaping (China) Yang Ying

== UAE Open ==
Year location	Men's singles	Women's singles	Men's doubles	Women's doubles
2011; Dubai	(China) Wang Hao	(China) Ding Ning	(China) Ma Lin (China) Zhang Jike	(China) Guo Yue (China) Li Xiaoxia

== US Open ==
Year location	Men's singles	Women's singles	Men's doubles	Women's doubles
2005; Fort Lauderdale	(South Korea) Oh Sang-Eun	(Singapore) Li Jiawei	(South Korea) Lee Jung-Woo (South Korea) Oh Sang-Eun	(Hong Kong) Tie Ya Na (Hong Kong) Zhang Rui
2004; Chicago	(South Korea) Ryu Seung-Min	(Singapore) Li Jiawei	(South Korea) Lee Chul-Seung (South Korea) Ryu Seung-Min	(Austria) Liu Jia (United States) Wang Chen
2002; Fort Lauderdale	(China) Ma Lin	(China) Zhang Yining	(China) Kong Linghui (China) Ma Lin	(China) Li Nan (China) Zhang Yining
2001; Fort Lauderdale	(China) Liu Guozheng	(China) Niu Jianfeng	(Chinese Taipei) Chiang Peng-Lung (Chinese Taipei) Chang Yen-Shu	(China) Bai Yang (China) Niu Jianfeng
2000; Fort Lauderdale	(China) Wang Liqin	(China) Wang Nan	(China) Kong Linghui (China) Liu Guoliang	(Chinese Taipei) Chen Jing (Chinese Taipei) Xu Jing
1998; Houston	(Belgium) Jean-Michel Saive	(Luxembourg) Ni Xialian	(United States) Cheng Yinghua (Belgium) Jean-Michel Saive	(Japan) Keiko Okazaki (Japan) Aya Umemura
1997; Fort Lauderdale	(China) Kong Linghui	(China) Wang Nan	(South Korea) Lee Chul-Seung (South Korea) Oh Sang-Eun	(South Korea) Lee Eun-Sil (South Korea) Ryu Ji-Hae
1996; Fort Lauderdale	(Romania) Vasile Florea	(South Korea) Lee Eun-Sil	(Austria) Karl Jindrak (Austria) Werner Schlager	(Canada) Chiu-Chen Xiaowen Barbara (Canada) Geng Lijuan
