= List of ITTF World Tour Grand Finals medalists =

== Events ==
=== Men's singles ===
Year	Host City	Gold	Silver	Semi-finalists
1996	Tianjin	(China) Kong Linghui	(Belarus) Vladimir Samsonov	(Romania) Vasile Florea
1996	Tianjin	(China) Kong Linghui	(Belarus) Vladimir Samsonov	(Germany) Jörg Roßkopf
1997	Hong Kong	(Belarus) Vladimir Samsonov	(China) Wang Liqin	(Croatia) Zoran Primorac
1997	Hong Kong	(Belarus) Vladimir Samsonov	(China) Wang Liqin	(Belgium) Jean-Michel Saive
1998	Paris	(China) Wang Liqin	(China) Liu Guoliang	(China) Kong Linghui
1998	Paris	(China) Wang Liqin	(China) Liu Guoliang	(Sweden) Jan-Ove Waldner
1999	Sydney	(China) Liu Guozheng	(China) Kong Linghui	(Chinese Taipei) Chiang Peng-lung
1999	Sydney	(China) Liu Guozheng	(China) Kong Linghui	(Austria) Werner Schlager
2000	Kobe	(China) Wang Liqin	(China) Liu Guozheng	(Chinese Taipei) Chiang Peng-lung
2000	Kobe	(China) Wang Liqin	(China) Liu Guozheng	(China) Ma Lin
2001	Hainan	(China) Ma Lin	(China) Wang Liqin	(Chinese Taipei) Chiang Peng-lung
2001	Hainan	(China) Ma Lin	(China) Wang Liqin	(Belgium) Jean-Michel Saive
2002	Stockholm	(Chinese Taipei) Chuang Chih-yuan	(Greece) Kalinikos Kreanga	(Germany) Timo Boll
2002	Stockholm	(Chinese Taipei) Chuang Chih-yuan	(Greece) Kalinikos Kreanga	(China) Wang Hao
2003	Guangzhou	(China) Wang Hao	(China) Hao Shuai	(Sweden) Jens Lundqvist
2003	Guangzhou	(China) Wang Hao	(China) Hao Shuai	(South Korea) Ryu Seung-min
2004	Beijing	(China) Wang Liqin	(China) Ma Lin	(Germany) Timo Boll
2004	Beijing	(China) Wang Liqin	(China) Ma Lin	(China) Wang Hao
2005	Fuzhou	(Germany) Timo Boll	(Belgium) Jean-Michel Saive	(South Korea) Oh Sang-eun
2005	Fuzhou	(Germany) Timo Boll	(Belgium) Jean-Michel Saive	(South Korea) Ryu Seung-min
2006	Hong Kong	(China) Wang Hao	(South Korea) Oh Sang-eun	(China) Hou Yingchao
2006	Hong Kong	(China) Wang Hao	(South Korea) Oh Sang-eun	(China) Ma Lin
2007	Beijing	(China) Ma Lin	(China) Wang Hao	(China) Ma Long
2007	Beijing	(China) Ma Lin	(China) Wang Hao	(China) Wang Liqin
2008	Macau	(China) Ma Long	(China) Wang Hao	(China) Ma Lin
2008	Macau	(China) Ma Long	(China) Wang Hao	(Belarus) Vladimir Samsonov
2009	Macau	(China) Ma Long	(China) Xu Xin	(China) Wang Liqin
2009	Macau	(China) Ma Long	(China) Xu Xin	(China) Zhang Jike
2010	Seoul	(Japan) Jun Mizutani	(Germany) Bastian Steger	(South Korea) Ryu Seung-min
2010	Seoul	(Japan) Jun Mizutani	(Germany) Bastian Steger	(Belarus) Vladimir Samsonov
2011	London	(China) Ma Long	(China) Zhang Jike	(Singapore) Gao Ning
2011	London	(China) Ma Long	(China) Zhang Jike	(China) Wang Hao
2012	Hangzhou	(China) Xu Xin	(China) Wang Hao	(Chinese Taipei) Chuang Chih-yuan
2012	Hangzhou	(China) Xu Xin	(China) Wang Hao	(China) Ma Lin
2013	Dubai	(China) Xu Xin	(China) Ma Long	(China) Fan Zhendong
2013	Dubai	(China) Xu Xin	(China) Ma Long	(South Korea) Kim Min-seok
2014	Bangkok	(Japan) Jun Mizutani	(Germany) Dimitrij Ovtcharov	(Portugal) Marcos Freitas
2014	Bangkok	(Japan) Jun Mizutani	(Germany) Dimitrij Ovtcharov	(Hong Kong) Tang Peng
2015	Lisbon	(China) Ma Long	(China) Fan Zhendong	(China) Xu Xin
2015	Lisbon	(China) Ma Long	(China) Fan Zhendong	(China) Zhang Jike
2016	Doha	(China) Ma Long	(China) Fan Zhendong	(South Korea) Jung Young-sik
2016	Doha	(China) Ma Long	(China) Fan Zhendong	(China) Xu Xin
2017	Astana	(China) Fan Zhendong	(Germany) Dimitrij Ovtcharov	(Germany) Timo Boll
2017	Astana	(China) Fan Zhendong	(Germany) Dimitrij Ovtcharov	(China) Lin Gaoyuan
2018	Incheon	(Japan) Tomokazu Harimoto	(China) Lin Gaoyuan	(Brazil) Hugo Calderano
2018	Incheon	(Japan) Tomokazu Harimoto	(China) Lin Gaoyuan	(Japan) Jun Mizutani
2019	Zhengzhou	(China) Fan Zhendong	(China) Ma Long	(China) Lin Gaoyuan
2019	Zhengzhou	(China) Fan Zhendong	(China) Ma Long	(China) Xu Xin
2020	Zhengzhou	(China) Ma Long	(China) Fan Zhendong	(South Korea) Jang Woo-jin
2020	Zhengzhou	(China) Ma Long	(China) Fan Zhendong	(China) Xu Xin

=== Women's singles ===
Year	Host City	Gold	Silver	Semi-finalists
1996	Tianjin	(China) Deng Yaping	(China) Li Ju	(China) Wang Chen
1996	Tianjin	(China) Deng Yaping	(China) Li Ju	(China) Yang Ying
1997	Hong Kong	(China) Li Ju	(China) Wang Nan	(South Korea) Park Hae-jung
1997	Hong Kong	(China) Li Ju	(China) Wang Nan	(South Korea) Ryu Ji-hye
1998	Paris	(China) Wang Nan	(China) Lin Ling	(China) Li Ju
1998	Paris	(China) Wang Nan	(China) Lin Ling	(China) Sun Jin
1999	Sydney	(Chinese Taipei) Chen Jing	(China) Li Ju	(Germany) Qianhong Gotsch
1999	Sydney	(Chinese Taipei) Chen Jing	(China) Li Ju	(China) Sun Jin
2000	Kobe	(China) Zhang Yining	(China) Wang Nan	(Croatia) Tamara Boroš
2000	Kobe	(China) Zhang Yining	(China) Wang Nan	(China) Yang Ying
2001	Hainan	(China) Wang Nan	(China) Niu Jianfeng	(China) Guo Yan
2001	Hainan	(China) Wang Nan	(China) Niu Jianfeng	(China) Li Jia
2002	Stockholm	(China) Zhang Yining	(China) Guo Yue	(China) Guo Yan
2002	Stockholm	(China) Zhang Yining	(China) Guo Yue	(China) Niu Jianfeng
2003	Guangzhou	(China) Niu Jianfeng	(China) Zhang Yining	(China) Guo Yan
2003	Guangzhou	(China) Niu Jianfeng	(China) Zhang Yining	(China) Wang Nan
2004	Beijing	(China) Guo Yue	(China) Niu Jianfeng	(Austria) Liu Jia
2004	Beijing	(China) Guo Yue	(China) Niu Jianfeng	(China) Wang Nan
2005	Fuzhou	(China) Zhang Yining	(Singapore) Li Jiawei	(South Korea) Moon Hyun-jung
2005	Fuzhou	(China) Zhang Yining	(Singapore) Li Jiawei	(Hong Kong) Tie Ya Na
2006	Hong Kong	(China) Zhang Yining	(China) Li Xiaoxia	(Singapore) Li Jiawei
2006	Hong Kong	(China) Zhang Yining	(China) Li Xiaoxia	(Spain) Shen Yanfei
2007	Beijing	(China) Li Xiaoxia	(China) Guo Yue	(China) Guo Yan
2007	Beijing	(China) Li Xiaoxia	(China) Guo Yue	(China) Zhang Yining
2008	Macau	(China) Guo Yan	(China) Guo Yue	(Singapore) Feng Tianwei
2008	Macau	(China) Guo Yan	(China) Guo Yue	(Singapore) Wang Yuegu
2009	Macau	(China) Guo Yan	(China) Ding Ning	(Singapore) Feng Tianwei
2009	Macau	(China) Guo Yan	(China) Ding Ning	(South Korea) Kim Kyung-ah
2010	Seoul	(Singapore) Feng Tianwei	(South Korea) Seok Ha-jung	(Japan) Ai Fukuhara
2010	Seoul	(Singapore) Feng Tianwei	(South Korea) Seok Ha-jung	(Netherlands) Li Jiao
2011	London	(China) Liu Shiwen	(China) Ding Ning	(China) Li Xiaoxia
2011	London	(China) Liu Shiwen	(China) Ding Ning	(Singapore) Wang Yuegu
2012	Hangzhou	(China) Liu Shiwen	(China) Ding Ning	(China) Chen Meng
2012	Hangzhou	(China) Liu Shiwen	(China) Ding Ning	(Singapore) Feng Tianwei
2013	Dubai	(China) Liu Shiwen	(China) Ding Ning	(China) Li Xiaoxia
2013	Dubai	(China) Liu Shiwen	(China) Ding Ning	(Belarus) Viktoria Pavlovich
2014	Bangkok	(Japan) Kasumi Ishikawa	(South Korea) Seo Hyo-won	(Hungary) Georgina Póta
2014	Bangkok	(Japan) Kasumi Ishikawa	(South Korea) Seo Hyo-won	(Singapore) Yu Mengyu
2015	Lisbon	(China) Ding Ning	(China) Chen Meng	(South Korea) Jeon Ji-hee
2015	Lisbon	(China) Ding Ning	(China) Chen Meng	(China) Zhu Yuling
2016	Doha	(China) Zhu Yuling	(Germany) Han Ying	(Japan) Miu Hirano
2016	Doha	(China) Zhu Yuling	(Germany) Han Ying	(Japan) Kasumi Ishikawa
2017	Astana	(China) Chen Meng	(China) Zhu Yuling	(China) Chen Xingtong
2017	Astana	(China) Chen Meng	(China) Zhu Yuling	(China) Gu Yuting
2018	Incheon	(China) Chen Meng	(China) He Zhuojia	(China) Ding Ning
2018	Incheon	(China) Chen Meng	(China) He Zhuojia	(China) Zhu Yuling
2019	Zhengzhou	(China) Chen Meng	(China) Wang Manyu	(Japan) Mima Ito
2019	Zhengzhou	(China) Chen Meng	(China) Wang Manyu	(China) Wang Yidi
2020	Zhengzhou	(China) Chen Meng	(China) Wang Manyu	(Japan) Mima Ito
2020	Zhengzhou	(China) Chen Meng	(China) Wang Manyu	(China) Sun Yingsha

=== Men's doubles ===
Year	Host City	Gold	Silver	Semi-finalists
1996	Tianjin	(China) Wang Liqin (China) Yan Sen	(Germany) Jörg Roßkopf (Belarus) Vladimir Samsonov	(Federal Republic of Yugoslavia) Slobodan Grujić (Federal Republic of Yugoslavia) Aleksandar Karakašević
1996	Tianjin	(China) Wang Liqin (China) Yan Sen	(Germany) Jörg Roßkopf (Belarus) Vladimir Samsonov	(China) Lü Lin (China) Wang Tao
1997	Hong Kong	(China) Kong Linghui (China) Liu Guoliang	(Germany) Jörg Roßkopf (Belarus) Vladimir Samsonov	(France) Patrick Chila (France) Christophe Legout
1997	Hong Kong	(China) Kong Linghui (China) Liu Guoliang	(Germany) Jörg Roßkopf (Belarus) Vladimir Samsonov	(China) Wang Liqin (China) Yan Sen
1998	Paris	(China) Wang Liqin (China) Yan Sen	(China) Ma Lin (China) Qin Zhijian	(France) Patrick Chila (France) Jean-Philippe Gatien
1998	Paris	(China) Wang Liqin (China) Yan Sen	(China) Ma Lin (China) Qin Zhijian	(China) Kong Linghui (China) Liu Guoliang
1999	Sydney	(China) Kong Linghui (China) Ma Lin	(France) Patrick Chila (France) Jean-Philippe Gatien	(Austria) Karl Jindrak (Austria) Werner Schlager
1999	Sydney	(China) Kong Linghui (China) Ma Lin	(France) Patrick Chila (France) Jean-Philippe Gatien	(China) Wang Liqin (China) Yan Sen
2000	Kobe	(China) Wang Liqin (China) Yan Sen	(South Korea) Kim Taek-soo (South Korea) Oh Sang-eun	(Chinese Taipei) Chiang Peng-lung (Chinese Taipei) Chang Yen-shu
2000	Kobe	(China) Wang Liqin (China) Yan Sen	(South Korea) Kim Taek-soo (South Korea) Oh Sang-eun	(China) Liu Guozheng (China) Ma Lin
2001	Hainan	(South Korea) Kim Taek-soo (South Korea) Oh Sang-eun	(Hong Kong) Cheung Yuk (Hong Kong) Leung Chu Yan	(Germany) Timo Boll (Germany) Zoltan Fejer-Konnerth
2001	Hainan	(South Korea) Kim Taek-soo (South Korea) Oh Sang-eun	(Hong Kong) Cheung Yuk (Hong Kong) Leung Chu Yan	(Federal Republic of Yugoslavia) Slobodan Grujić (Federal Republic of Yugoslavia) Aleksandar Karakašević
2002	Stockholm	(China) Kong Linghui (China) Ma Lin	(Japan) Akira Kito (Japan) Toshio Tasaki	(Hong Kong) Cheung Yuk (Hong Kong) Leung Chu Yan
2002	Stockholm	(China) Kong Linghui (China) Ma Lin	(Japan) Akira Kito (Japan) Toshio Tasaki	(China) Qin Zhijian (China) Wang Liqin
2003	Guangzhou	(China) Chen Qi (China) Ma Lin	(Hong Kong) Cheung Yuk (Hong Kong) Leung Chu Yan	(China) Hao Shuai (China) Qiu Yike
2003	Guangzhou	(China) Chen Qi (China) Ma Lin	(Hong Kong) Cheung Yuk (Hong Kong) Leung Chu Yan	(Serbia and Montenegro) Aleksandar Karakašević (Slovenia) Bojan Tokič
2004	Beijing	(China) Chen Qi (China) Ma Lin	(China) Kong Linghui (China) Wang Hao	(Hong Kong) Ko Lai Chak (Hong Kong) Li Ching
2004	Beijing	(China) Chen Qi (China) Ma Lin	(China) Kong Linghui (China) Wang Hao	(Denmark) Michael Maze (Denmark) Finn Tugwell
2005	Fuzhou	(Germany) Timo Boll (Germany) Christian Süß	(South Korea) Lee Jung-woo (South Korea) Oh Sang-eun	(China) Chen Qi (China) Wang Liqin
2005	Fuzhou	(Germany) Timo Boll (Germany) Christian Süß	(South Korea) Lee Jung-woo (South Korea) Oh Sang-eun	(Hong Kong) Ko Lai Chak (Hong Kong) Li Ching
2006	Hong Kong	(China) Hao Shuai (China) Ma Long	(China) Chen Qi (China) Ma Lin	(Hong Kong) Cheung Yuk (Hong Kong) Leung Chu Yan
2006	Hong Kong	(China) Hao Shuai (China) Ma Long	(China) Chen Qi (China) Ma Lin	(Hong Kong) Ko Lai Chak (Hong Kong) Li Ching
2007	Beijing	(China) Chen Qi (China) Wang Liqin	(China) Ma Lin (China) Wang Hao	(China) Hao Shuai (China) Ma Long
2007	Beijing	(China) Chen Qi (China) Wang Liqin	(China) Ma Lin (China) Wang Hao	(Hong Kong) Ko Lai Chak (Hong Kong) Li Ching
2008	Macau	(Singapore) Gao Ning (Singapore) Yang Zi	(Chinese Taipei) Chuang Chih-yuan (Chinese Taipei) Wu Chih-chi	(France) Emmanuel Lebesson (France) Adrien Mattenet
2008	Macau	(Singapore) Gao Ning (Singapore) Yang Zi	(Chinese Taipei) Chuang Chih-yuan (Chinese Taipei) Wu Chih-chi	(Russia) Alexey Liventsov (Russia) Igor Rubtsov
2009	Macau	(Germany) Timo Boll (Germany) Christian Süß	(Singapore) Gao Ning (Singapore) Yang Zi	(Germany) Patrick Baum (Germany) Lars Hielscher
2009	Macau	(Germany) Timo Boll (Germany) Christian Süß	(Singapore) Gao Ning (Singapore) Yang Zi	(France) Emmanuel Lebesson (France) Adrien Mattenet
2010	Seoul	(Hong Kong) Jiang Tianyi (Hong Kong) Tang Peng	(Singapore) Gao Ning (Singapore) Yang Zi	(South Korea) Lee Sang-su (South Korea) Seo Hyun-deok
2010	Seoul	(Hong Kong) Jiang Tianyi (Hong Kong) Tang Peng	(Singapore) Gao Ning (Singapore) Yang Zi	(Belgium) Benjamin Rogiers (Belgium) Yannick Vostes
2011	London	(China) Ma Lin (China) Zhang Jike	(China) Ma Long (China) Wang Hao	(Austria) Robert Gardos (Austria) Daniel Habesohn
2011	London	(China) Ma Lin (China) Zhang Jike	(China) Ma Long (China) Wang Hao	(Singapore) Yang Zi (Singapore) Zhan Jian
2012	Hangzhou	(Singapore) Gao Ning (Singapore) Li Hu	(Japan) Seiya Kishikawa (Japan) Koki Niwa	(South Korea) Kim Dong-hyun (South Korea) Lee Jung-woo
2012	Hangzhou	(Singapore) Gao Ning (Singapore) Li Hu	(Japan) Seiya Kishikawa (Japan) Koki Niwa	(South Korea) Oh Sang-eun (South Korea) Ryu Seung-min
2013	Dubai	(Singapore) Gao Ning (Singapore) Li Hu	(Chinese Taipei) Chiang Hung-chieh (Chinese Taipei) Huang Sheng-sheng	(Sweden) Kristian Karlsson (Sweden) Mattias Karlsson
2013	Dubai	(Singapore) Gao Ning (Singapore) Li Hu	(Chinese Taipei) Chiang Hung-chieh (Chinese Taipei) Huang Sheng-sheng	(South Korea) Kim Min-seok (South Korea) Seo Hyun-deok
2014	Bangkok	(South Korea) Cho Eon-rae (South Korea) Seo Hyun-deok	(Japan) Kenta Matsudaira (Japan) Koki Niwa	(Russia) Alexey Liventsov (Russia) Mikhail Paikov
2014	Bangkok	(South Korea) Cho Eon-rae (South Korea) Seo Hyun-deok	(Japan) Kenta Matsudaira (Japan) Koki Niwa	(Hong Kong) Tang Peng (Hong Kong) Wong Chun-ting
2015	Lisbon	(Japan) Masataka Morizono (Japan) Yuya Oshima	(Portugal) Tiago Apolónia (Portugal) João Monteiro	(Chinese Taipei) Chiang Hung-chieh (Chinese Taipei) Huang Sheng-sheng
2015	Lisbon	(Japan) Masataka Morizono (Japan) Yuya Oshima	(Portugal) Tiago Apolónia (Portugal) João Monteiro	(South Korea) Jung Young-sik (South Korea) Kim Min-seok
2016	Doha	(South Korea) Jung Young-sik (South Korea) Lee Sang-su	(Japan) Masataka Morizono (Japan) Yuya Oshima	(Hong Kong) Ho Kwan-kit (Hong Kong) Tang Peng
2016	Doha	(South Korea) Jung Young-sik (South Korea) Lee Sang-su	(Japan) Masataka Morizono (Japan) Yuya Oshima	(Russia) Alexey Liventsov (Russia) Mikhail Paikov
2017	Astana	(Japan) Masataka Morizono (Japan) Yuya Oshima	(Hong Kong) Ho Kwan-kit (Hong Kong) Wong Chun-ting	(Chinese Taipei) Chen Chien-an (Chinese Taipei) Chiang Hung-chieh
2017	Astana	(Japan) Masataka Morizono (Japan) Yuya Oshima	(Hong Kong) Ho Kwan-kit (Hong Kong) Wong Chun-ting	(Japan) Jin Ueda (Japan) Maharu Yoshimura
2018	Incheon	(South Korea) Jang Woo-jin (South Korea) Lim Jong-hoon	(Hong Kong) Ho Kwan-kit (Hong Kong) Wong Chun-ting	(South Korea) Jung Young-sik (South Korea) Lee Sang-su
2018	Incheon	(South Korea) Jang Woo-jin (South Korea) Lim Jong-hoon	(Hong Kong) Ho Kwan-kit (Hong Kong) Wong Chun-ting	(Japan) Masataka Morizono (Japan) Yuya Oshima
2019	Zhengzhou	(China) Fan Zhendong (China) Xu Xin	(Chinese Taipei) Liao Cheng-ting (Chinese Taipei) Lin Yun-ju	(Germany) Timo Boll (Germany) Patrick Franziska
2019	Zhengzhou	(China) Fan Zhendong (China) Xu Xin	(Chinese Taipei) Liao Cheng-ting (Chinese Taipei) Lin Yun-ju	(China) Liang Jingkun (China) Lin Gaoyuan

=== Women's doubles ===
Year	Host City	Gold	Silver	Semi-finalists
1996	Tianjin	(China) Deng Yaping (China) Yang Ying	(South Korea) Park Hae-jung (South Korea) Ryu Ji-hye	(China) Cheng Hongxia (China) Wang Hui
1996	Tianjin	(China) Deng Yaping (China) Yang Ying	(South Korea) Park Hae-jung (South Korea) Ryu Ji-hye	(South Korea) Kim Moo-kyo (South Korea) Park Kyung-ae
1997	Hong Kong	(China) Li Ju (China) Wang Nan	(South Korea) Kim Moo-kyo (South Korea) Park Hae-jung	(China) Cheng Hongxia (China) Wang Hui
1997	Hong Kong	(China) Li Ju (China) Wang Nan	(South Korea) Kim Moo-kyo (South Korea) Park Hae-jung	(South Korea) Lee Eun-sil (South Korea) Ryu Ji-hye
1998	Paris	(China) Li Ju (China) Wang Nan	(China) Cheng Hongxia (China) Wang Hui	(Japan) Ai Fujinuma (Japan) An Konishi
1998	Paris	(China) Li Ju (China) Wang Nan	(China) Cheng Hongxia (China) Wang Hui	(Austria) Judit Herczig (Austria) Liu Jia
1999	Sydney	(China) Li Ju (China) Wang Nan	(China) Sun Jin (China) Yang Ying	(Austria) Judit Herczig (Austria) Liu Jia
1999	Sydney	(China) Li Ju (China) Wang Nan	(China) Sun Jin (China) Yang Ying	(China) Li Nan (China) Lin Ling
2000	Kobe	(China) Sun Jin (China) Yang Ying	(Japan) Mayu Kishi-Kawagoe (Japan) Akiko Takeda	(South Korea) Lee Eun-sil (South Korea) Seok Eun-mi
2000	Kobe	(China) Sun Jin (China) Yang Ying	(Japan) Mayu Kishi-Kawagoe (Japan) Akiko Takeda	(China) Li Ju (China) Wang Nan
2001	Hainan	(South Korea) Lee Eun-sil (South Korea) Ryu Ji-hye	(North Korea) Kim Hyang-mi (North Korea) Kim Hyon-hui	(Japan) Ai Fujinuma (Japan) Reiko Hiura
2001	Hainan	(South Korea) Lee Eun-sil (South Korea) Ryu Ji-hye	(North Korea) Kim Hyang-mi (North Korea) Kim Hyon-hui	(China) Gao Xi (China) Li Jia
2002	Stockholm	(China) Li Jia (China) Niu Jianfeng	(China) Li Nan (China) Zhang Yining	(Singapore) Jing Junhong (Singapore) Li Jiawei
2002	Stockholm	(China) Li Jia (China) Niu Jianfeng	(China) Li Nan (China) Zhang Yining	(South Korea) Lee Eun-sil (South Korea) Seok Eun-mi
2003	Guangzhou	(China) Guo Yue (China) Niu Jianfeng	(China) Wang Nan (China) Zhang Yining	(China) Guo Yan (China) Li Nan
2003	Guangzhou	(China) Guo Yue (China) Niu Jianfeng	(China) Wang Nan (China) Zhang Yining	(Hong Kong) Lin Ling (Hong Kong) Zhang Rui
2004	Beijing	(China) Wang Nan (China) Zhang Yining	(China) Guo Yue (China) Niu Jianfeng	(South Korea) Lee Eun-sil (South Korea) Seok Eun-mi
2004	Beijing	(China) Wang Nan (China) Zhang Yining	(China) Guo Yue (China) Niu Jianfeng	(Hong Kong) Song Ah Sim (Hong Kong) Tie Ya Na
2005	Fuzhou	(United States) Gao Jun (Spain) Shen Yanfei	(South Korea) Kim Bok-rae (South Korea) Kim Kyung-ah	(Germany) Tanja Hain-Hofmann (Hungary) Georgina Póta
2005	Fuzhou	(United States) Gao Jun (Spain) Shen Yanfei	(South Korea) Kim Bok-rae (South Korea) Kim Kyung-ah	(Singapore) Sun Beibei (Singapore) Wang Yuegu
2006	Hong Kong	(China) Wang Nan (China) Zhang Yining	(United States) Gao Jun (Spain) Shen Yanfei	(China) Guo Yue (China) Li Xiaoxia
2006	Hong Kong	(China) Wang Nan (China) Zhang Yining	(United States) Gao Jun (Spain) Shen Yanfei	(Singapore) Li Jiawei (Singapore) Sun Beibei
2007	Beijing	(China) Guo Yue (China) Li Xiaoxia	(South Korea) Kim Kyung-ah (South Korea) Park Mi-young	(Singapore) Li Jiawei (Singapore) Wang Yuegu
2007	Beijing	(China) Guo Yue (China) Li Xiaoxia	(South Korea) Kim Kyung-ah (South Korea) Park Mi-young	(Hong Kong) Tie Ya Na (Hong Kong) Zhang Rui
2008	Macau	(Singapore) Li Jiawei (Singapore) Sun Beibei	(South Korea) Kim Kyung-ah (South Korea) Park Mi-young	(Romania) Daniela Dodean (Romania) Elizabeta Samara
2008	Macau	(Singapore) Li Jiawei (Singapore) Sun Beibei	(South Korea) Kim Kyung-ah (South Korea) Park Mi-young	(Hong Kong) Jiang Huajun (Hong Kong) Tie Ya Na
2009	Macau	(China) Ding Ning (China) Liu Shiwen	(Hong Kong) Jiang Huajun (Hong Kong) Tie Ya Na	(Germany) Elke Schall (Germany) Wu Jiaduo
2009	Macau	(China) Ding Ning (China) Liu Shiwen	(Hong Kong) Jiang Huajun (Hong Kong) Tie Ya Na	(Singapore) Sun Beibei (Singapore) Wang Yuegu
2010	Seoul	(South Korea) Kim Kyung-ah (South Korea) Park Mi-young	(Hong Kong) Jiang Huajun (Hong Kong) Tie Ya Na	(Chinese Taipei) Cheng I-ching (Chinese Taipei) Huang Yi-hua
2010	Seoul	(South Korea) Kim Kyung-ah (South Korea) Park Mi-young	(Hong Kong) Jiang Huajun (Hong Kong) Tie Ya Na	(Netherlands) Li Jiao (Netherlands) Li Jie
2011	London	(China) Guo Yue (China) Li Xiaoxia	(Japan) Ai Fukuhara (Japan) Kasumi Ishikawa	(Singapore) Li Jiawei (Singapore) Wang Yuegu
2011	London	(China) Guo Yue (China) Li Xiaoxia	(Japan) Ai Fukuhara (Japan) Kasumi Ishikawa	(South Korea) Seok Ha-jung (South Korea) Yang Ha-eun
2012	Hangzhou	(Singapore) Feng Tianwei (Singapore) Yu Mengyu	(Chinese Taipei) Cheng I-ching (Chinese Taipei) Huang Yi-hua	(Hong Kong) Jiang Huajun (Hong Kong) Lee Ho Ching
2012	Hangzhou	(Singapore) Feng Tianwei (Singapore) Yu Mengyu	(Chinese Taipei) Cheng I-ching (Chinese Taipei) Huang Yi-hua	(South Korea) Lee Eun-hee (South Korea) Park Young-sook
2013	Dubai	(China) Ding Ning (China) Li Xiaoxia	(Chinese Taipei) Cheng I-ching (Chinese Taipei) Huang Yi-hua	(Germany) Zhenqi Barthel (Germany) Shan Xiaona
2013	Dubai	(China) Ding Ning (China) Li Xiaoxia	(Chinese Taipei) Cheng I-ching (Chinese Taipei) Huang Yi-hua	(South Korea) Park Young-sook (South Korea) Yang Ha-eun
2014	Bangkok	(Japan) Miu Hirano (Japan) Mima Ito	(Poland) Katarzyna Grzybowska (Poland) Natalia Partyka	(Singapore) Feng Tianwei (Singapore) Yu Mengyu
2014	Bangkok	(Japan) Miu Hirano (Japan) Mima Ito	(Poland) Katarzyna Grzybowska (Poland) Natalia Partyka	(Hong Kong) Lee Ho Ching (Hong Kong) Ng Wing Nam
2015	Lisbon	(China) Ding Ning (China) Zhu Yuling	(Japan) Miu Hirano (Japan) Mima Ito	(South Korea) Jeon Ji-hee (South Korea) Yang Ha-eun
2015	Lisbon	(China) Ding Ning (China) Zhu Yuling	(Japan) Miu Hirano (Japan) Mima Ito	(Hong Kong) Jiang Huajun (Hong Kong) Tie Ya Na
2016	Doha	(Japan) Yui Hamamoto (Japan) Hina Hayata	(Hong Kong) Doo Hoi Kem (Hong Kong) Lee Ho Ching	(South Korea) Jeon Ji-hee (South Korea) Yang Ha-eun
2016	Doha	(Japan) Yui Hamamoto (Japan) Hina Hayata	(Hong Kong) Doo Hoi Kem (Hong Kong) Lee Ho Ching	(Japan) Honoka Hashimoto (Japan) Hitomi Sato
2017	Astana	(China) Chen Meng (China) Zhu Yuling	(Japan) Hina Hayata (Japan) Mima Ito	(Hong Kong) Doo Hoi Kem (Hong Kong) Lee Ho Ching
2017	Astana	(China) Chen Meng (China) Zhu Yuling	(Japan) Hina Hayata (Japan) Mima Ito	(Japan) Honoka Hashimoto (Japan) Hitomi Sato
2018	Incheon	(Japan) Hina Hayata (Japan) Mima Ito	(China) Chen Xingtong (China) Sun Yingsha	(China) Chen Ke (China) Wang Manyu
2018	Incheon	(Japan) Hina Hayata (Japan) Mima Ito	(China) Chen Xingtong (China) Sun Yingsha	(South Korea) Jeon Ji-hee (South Korea) Yang Ha-eun
2019	Zhengzhou	(Japan) Miyuu Kihara (Japan) Miyu Nagasaki	(South Korea) Jeon Ji-hee (South Korea) Yang Ha-eun	(Chinese Taipei) Chen Szu-yu (Chinese Taipei) Cheng Hsien-tzu
2019	Zhengzhou	(Japan) Miyuu Kihara (Japan) Miyu Nagasaki	(South Korea) Jeon Ji-hee (South Korea) Yang Ha-eun	(China) Sun Yingsha (China) Wang Manyu

=== Mixed doubles ===
Year	Host City	Gold	Silver	Semi-finalists
2018	Incheon	(Hong Kong) Wong Chun-ting (Hong Kong) Doo Hoi Kem	(South Korea) Jang Woo-jin (North Korea) Cha Hyo-sim	(South Korea) Lim Jong-hoon (South Korea) Yang Ha-eun
2018	Incheon	(Hong Kong) Wong Chun-ting (Hong Kong) Doo Hoi Kem	(South Korea) Jang Woo-jin (North Korea) Cha Hyo-sim	(Japan) Masataka Morizono (Japan) Mima Ito
2019	Zhengzhou	(China) Xu Xin (China) Liu Shiwen	(Japan) Jun Mizutani (Japan) Mima Ito	(Chinese Taipei) Lin Yun-ju (Chinese Taipei) Cheng I-ching
2019	Zhengzhou	(China) Xu Xin (China) Liu Shiwen	(Japan) Jun Mizutani (Japan) Mima Ito	(Hong Kong) Wong Chun-ting (Hong Kong) Doo Hoi Kem

== See also ==
- ITTF World Tour
- ITTF World Tour Grand Finals
