= China Open (table tennis) =

Annual table tennis tournament in China

Tournament information
- Event name: China Open
- Tour: ITTF World Tour
- Founded: 1988
- Location: Shenzhen (from 2018)
- Venue: Bao'an District Sports Center Gymnasium (2018)
- Category: World Tour Platinum
- Draw: 32S / 16D
- Prize money: US$346,000 (2018)

The China Open is an annual table tennis tournament in China, run by the International Table Tennis Federation (ITTF). It is currently part of the ITTF World Tour.

== History ==
The tournament was first held in 1988, and has featured on the ITTF World Tour's schedule every year since the Tour's inception in 1996.

China's Ma Long holds the record for most men's singles tournament wins, with eight, while Wang Nan, Zhang Yining and Li Xiaoxia of China all share the record for most women's singles tournament wins, with five each.

In August 2016, it was announced by the ITTF that Chengdu has been chosen as one of six cities to host a "World Tour Platinum" event in 2017. These events will replace the Super Series as the top tier of the ITTF World Tour.

== Champions ==
=== Individual Events ===
==== 1988–1989 ====
| Year | Host City | Men's singles | Women's singles | Men's doubles | Women's doubles | Mixed doubles |
|---|---|---|---|---|---|---|
| 1988 | Guangzhou | (China) Xu Zengcai | (China) He Zhili | (China) Chen Longcan (China) Wei Qingguang | (Japan) Katsuko Tominaga (Japan) Kyoko Uchiyama | (China) Lin Zhigang (China) Liu Wei |
| 1989 | Shanghai | (China) Chen Zhibin | (China) Deng Yaping | (China) Ma Wenge (China) Yu Shentong | (China) Chen Jing (China) Deng Yaping | (China) Chen Longcan (China) Chen Jing |

==== 1991–2017 ====
| Year | Host City | Men's singles | Women's singles | Men's doubles | Women's doubles |
|---|---|---|---|---|---|
| 1991 | Chengdu | (China) Lü Lin | (China) Qiao Hong | | |
| 1992 | Chengdu | (China) Ma Wenge | (China) Deng Yaping | | |
| 1993 | Hangzhou | (Belgium) Jean-Michel Saive | (China) Deng Yaping | | |
| 1994 | Dalian | (China) Wang Tao | (China) Liu Wei | (China) Lü Lin (China) Wang Tao | (China) Liu Wei (China) Qiao Yunping |
| 1995 | Shantou | (China) Kong Linghui | (China) Wang Nan | (China) Liu Guoliang (China) Wang Tao | (China) Wang Chen (China) Wu Na |
| 1996 | Xi'an | (China) Kong Linghui | (China) Wang Chen | (China) Kong Linghui (China) Liu Guoliang | (China) Wang Chen (China) Wu Na |
| 1997 | Zhuhai | (Croatia) Zoran Primorac | (China) Li Ju | (China) Kong Linghui (China) Liu Guoliang | (South Korea) Lee Eun-sil (South Korea) Ryu Ji-hae |
| 1998 | Jinan | (China) Liu Guoliang | (China) Wang Nan | (China) Ma Lin (China) Qin Zhijian | (China) Wu Na (China) Yang Ying |
| 1999 | Guilin | (China) Liu Guozheng | (China) Li Ju | (China) Wang Liqin (China) Yan Sen | (China) Li Nan (China) Lin Ling |
| 2000 | Changchun | (China) Wang Liqin | (China) Li Ju | (China) Wang Liqin (China) Yan Sen | (China) Sun Jin (China) Yang Ying |
| 2001 | Hainan | (China) Wang Liqin | (China) Wang Nan | (China) Wang Liqin (China) Yan Sen | (China) Bai Yang (China) Niu Jianfeng |
| 2002 | Qingdao | (China) Wang Liqin | (China) Wang Nan | (South Korea) Lee Chul-seung (South Korea) Ryu Seung-min | (South Korea) Lee Eun-sil (South Korea) Seok Eun-mi |
| 2003 | Guangzhou | (China) Ma Lin | (China) Zhang Yining | (China) Chen Qi (China) Ma Lin | (China) Bai Yang (China) Li Ju |
| 2004 | Wuxi | (China) Ma Lin | (China) Cao Zhen | (China) Chen Qi (China) Ma Lin | (China) Cao Zhen (China) Li Xiaoxia |
| 2004 | Changchun | (China) Wang Liqin | (China) Zhang Yining | (China) Kong Linghui (China) Wang Hao | (China) Wang Nan (China) Zhang Yining |
| 2005 | Shenzhen | (China) Wang Liqin | (China) Li Xiaoxia | (China) Chen Qi (China) Wang Liqin | (China) Guo Yue (China) Zhang Yining |
| 2005 | Harbin | (China) Wang Liqin | (China) Guo Yue | (China) Kong Linghui (China) Ma Long | (China) Guo Yan (China) Guo Yue |
| 2006 | Guangzhou | (Germany) Timo Boll | (China) Zhang Yining | (China) Hao Shuai (China) Wang Liqin | (United States) Gao Jun (Spain) Shen Yanfei |
| 2006 | Kunshan | (China) Ma Lin | (China) Wang Nan | (China) Chen Qi (China) Wang Liqin | (China) Wang Nan (China) Zhang Yining |
| 2007 | Nanjing | (China) Ma Lin | (China) Guo Yue | (China) Chen Qi (China) Wang Hao | (China) Guo Yue (China) Li Xiaoxia |
| 2007 | Shenzhen | (China) Wang Hao | (China) Zhang Yining | (China) Ma Lin (China) Wang Hao | (China) Guo Yan (China) Guo Yue |
| 2008 | Changchun | (China) Wang Hao | (China) Zhang Yining | | |
| 2008 | Shanghai | (China) Hao Shuai | (China) Li Xiaoxia | (China) Ma Lin (China) Wang Liqin | (Hong Kong) Jiang Huajun (Hong Kong) Tie Ya Na |
| 2009 | Tianjin | (China) Wang Hao | (China) Liu Shiwen | (China) Hao Shuai (China) Li Ping | (China) Ding Ning (China) Liu Shiwen |
| 2009 | Suzhou | (China) Ma Long | (China) Liu Shiwen | (Japan) Seiya Kishikawa (Japan) Jun Mizutani | (China) Guo Yue (China) Li Xiaoxia |
| 2010 | Suzhou | (China) Zhang Jike | (China) Li Xiaoxia | (China) Ma Lin (China) Xu Xin | (China) Guo Yue (China) Li Xiaoxia |
| 2011 | Shenzhen | (China) Ma Lin | (China) Wen Jia | (China) Ma Long (China) Wang Hao | (China) Guo Yue (China) Liu Shiwen |
| 2011 | Suzhou | (China) Ma Long | (China) Guo Yan | (China) Ma Lin (China) Zhang Jike | (China) Guo Yan (China) Guo Yue |
| 2012 | Shanghai | (China) Xu Xin | (China) Li Xiaoxia | (China) Ma Long (China) Wang Hao | (Hong Kong) Jiang Huajun (Hong Kong) Lee Ho Ching |
| 2012 | Suzhou | (China) Hao Shuai | (China) Chen Meng | (China) Wang Liqin (China) Xu Xin | (China) Chen Meng (China) Zhu Yuling |
| 2013 | Changchun | (China) Ma Long | (China) Li Xiaoxia | (Germany) Timo Boll (China) Ma Long | (China) Guo Yue (China) Liu Shiwen |
| 2013 | Suzhou | (China) Ma Long | (China) Chen Meng | (China) Ma Long (China) Xu Xin | (China) Chen Meng (China) Zhu Yuling |
| 2014 | Chengdu | (China) Ma Long | (China) Ding Ning | (China) Fan Zhendong (China) Ma Long | (China) Ding Ning (China) Liu Shiwen |
| 2015 | Chengdu | (China) Ma Long | (China) Zhu Yuling | (China) Fan Zhendong (China) Xu Xin | (China) Chen Meng (China) Liu Shiwen |
| 2016 | Chengdu | (China) Fan Zhendong | (China) Ding Ning | (China) Ma Long (China) Zhang Jike | (China) Chen Meng (China) Zhu Yuling |
| 2017 | Chengdu | (Germany) Dimitrij Ovtcharov | (China) Ding Ning | (Japan) Jin Ueda (Japan) Maharu Yoshimura | (China) Ding Ning (China) Liu Shiwen |

==== 2018–present ====
| Year | Host City | Men's singles | Women's singles | Men's doubles | Women's doubles | Mixed doubles |
|---|---|---|---|---|---|---|
| 2018 | Shenzhen | (China) Ma Long | (China) Wang Manyu | (China) Fan Zhendong (China) Lin Gaoyuan | (China) Ding Ning (China) Zhu Yuling | (China) Lin Gaoyuan (China) Chen Xingtong |
| 2019 | Shenzhen | (China) Ma Long | (China) Chen Meng | (Germany) Timo Boll (Germany) Patrick Franziska | (China) Gu Yuting (China) Liu Shiwen | (Chinese Taipei) Lin Yun-ju (Chinese Taipei) Cheng I-ching |

=== Team Events ===
| Year | Host City | Men's Team | Women's Team |
|---|---|---|---|
| 1988 | Guangzhou | China First Team | China |
| 1989 | Shanghai | China | China |
| 1991 | Chengdu | China | China |
| 1992 | Chengdu | China Second Team | China First Team |
| 1993 | Hangzhou | China Second Team | China First Team |
| 2008 | Changchun | China | China |

== See also ==
- Asian Table Tennis Union
- Chinese Table Tennis Association
