= 2001 World Table Tennis Championships – Mixed doubles =

2001 Mixed doubles

The 2001 World Table Tennis Championships mixed doubles was the 46th edition of the mixed doubles championship.

Qin Zhijian and Yang Ying defeated Oh Sang-eun and Kim Moo-kyo in the final by three sets to nil.

== Results ==
Round of 16
(China) Ma Lin (China) Zhang Yingying	21	21
(Canada) Johnny Huang (Canada) Geng Lijuan	18	11
(China) Zhan Jian (China) Bai Yang	21	19	21
(South Korea) Kim Taek-soo (South Korea) Lee Eun-sil	16	21	13
(China) Qin Zhijian (China) Yang Ying	21	14	21
(Japan) Ryo Yuzawa (Japan) Keiko Okazaki	15	21	12
(China) Yan Sen (China) Li Ju	21	21
(North Korea) Jong Kwang-hyok (North Korea) Kim Mi-yong	12	15
(China) Liu Guoliang (China) Sun Jin	21	21
(South Korea) Lee Chul-seung (South Korea) Ryu Ji-hae	14	9
(Czechoslovakia) Richard Vyborny (Czechoslovakia) Renáta Štrbíková	24	16	21
(North Korea) Jong Gyong Choi (North Korea) Kim Hyang-mi	22	21	17
(South Korea) Oh Sang-eun (South Korea) Kim Moo-kyo	21	21
(China) Liu Guozheng (China) Li Nan	19	14
(Hong Kong) Ko Lai Chak (Hong Kong) Wong Ching	21	17	21
(Romania) Adrian Crișan (Romania) Mihaela Steff	8	21	15

Quarterfinals
(China) Ma Lin (China) Zhang Yingying	14	15	18
(China) Zhan Jian (China) Bai Yang	21	21	21
(China) Qin Zhilan (China) Yang Ying	21	20	21	21	21
(China) Yan Sen (China) Li Ju	23	22	14	15	15
(China) Liu Guoliang (China) Sun Jin	21	21	14	21
(Czechoslovakia) Vyborny (Czechoslovakia) Strbikova	14	13	21	17
(South Korea) Oh Sang-eun (South Korea) Kim Moo-kyo	21	21	21
(Hong Kong) Ko Lai Chak (Hong Kong) Wong Ching	16	19	17

Semifinals
(China) Zhan Jian (China) Bai Yang	18	21	18	14
(China) Qin Zhilan (China) Yang Ying	21	19	21	21
(China) Liu Guoliang (China) Sun Jin	19	21	19	15
(South Korea) Oh Sang-eun (South Korea) Kim Moo-kyo	21	16	21	21

Final
(China) Qin Zhilan (China) Yang Ying	21	21	21
(South Korea) Oh Sang-eun (South Korea) Kim Moo-kyo	15	15	15

== See also ==
- List of World Table Tennis Championships medalists
