= 2003 World Table Tennis Championships – Men's doubles =

The 2003 World Table Tennis Championships men's doubles was the 47th edition of the men's doubles championship. Wang Liqin and Yan Sen won the title after defeating Kong Linghui and Wang Hao in the final by four sets to two.

== Finals ==
Third round
(China) Wang Liqin (China) Yan Sen	11	12	11	8	11
(Germany) Timo Boll (Germany) Zoltan Fejer-Konnerth	8	10	9	11	7
(Serbia) Slobodan Grujić (Serbia) Aleksandar Karakašević	6	11	11	11	6	11
(South Korea) Lee Chul-seung (South Korea) Ryu Seung-min	11	8	6	9	11	6
(China) Ma Lin (China) Qin Zhijian	9	11	12	11	11
(Russia) Alexey Smirnov (Russia) Dmitry Mazunov	11	6	10	8	7
(Japan) Ryusuke Sakomoto (Japan) Seiya Kishikawa	11	11	10	11	11
(Hong Kong) Ko Lai Chak (Hong Kong) Li Ching	8	7	12	4	8
(China) Kong Linghui (China) Wang Hao	11	11	11	11
(France) Jean-Philippe Gatien (France) Patrick Chila	3	8	4	6
(Japan) Toshio Tasaki (Japan) Akira Kito	9	9	11	6	4
(Austria) Werner Schlager (Austria) Karl Jindrak	11	11	6	11	11
(Chinese Taipei) Chuang Chih-yuan (Chinese Taipei) Chiang Peng-lung	5	11	11	12	8	9
(Hong Kong) Cheung Yuk (Hong Kong) Leung Chu Yan	11	9	5	14	11	11
(Hungary) Ferenc Pazsy (Hungary) Adam Lindner	11	7	8	10	8
(South Korea) Kim Taek-soo (South Korea) Oh Sang-eun	8	11	11	12	11

Quarterfinals
(China) Wang Liqin (China) Yan Sen	11	11	11	7	12
(Serbia) Grujic (Serbia) Karakašević	9	9	6	11	10
(China) Ma Lin (China) Qin Zhijian	11	11	12	11	11	11
(Hong Kong) Ko Lai Chak (Hong Kong) Li Ching	13	8	14	3	6	5
(China) Kong Linghui (China) Wang Hao	11	4	11	11	10	11
(Austria) Schlager (Austria) Jindrak	6	11	8	9	12	9
(Hong Kong) Cheung Yuk (Hong Kong) Leung Chu Yan	9	14	8	11	5	13	5
(South Korea) Kim Taek-soo (South Korea) Oh Sang-eun	11	12	11	8	11	11	11

Semifinals
(China) Wang Liqin (China) Yan Sen	10	11	11	11	11
(China) Ma Lin (China) Qin Zhijian	12	3	9	4	9
(China) Kong Linghui (China) Wang Hao	11	5	11	12	11
(South Korea) Kim Taek-soo (South Korea) Oh Sang-eun	9	11	2	10	7

Final
(China) Wanq Liqing (China) Yan Sen	11	11	7	11	8	11
(China) Kong Linghui (China) Wang Hao	9	8	11	6	11	5
