= 2005 World Table Tennis Championships =

- Date: Apr 29–May 6
- Edition: 48th
- Location: Shanghai, China
- Venue: Shanghai Grand Stage

Champions

Men's singles
- (China) Wang Liqin

Women's singles
- (China) Zhang Yining

Men's doubles
- (China) Kong Linghui / (China) Wang Hao

Women's doubles
- (China) Wang Nan / (China) Zhang Yining

Mixed doubles
- (China) Wang Liqin / (China) Guo Yue
- World Table Tennis Championships

The 2005 World Table Tennis Championships was held in the Shanghai Grand Stage of Shanghai, China from April 29 to May 6, 2005.

== Medal summary ==
=== Medal table ===
Rank	Nation	Gold	Silver	Bronze	Total
1	China	5	4	6	15
2	Germany	0	1	0	1
3	Hong Kong	0	0	2	2
4	Denmark	0	0	1	1
4	South Korea	0	0	1	1
Totals (5 entries)		5	5	10	20

=== Events ===
Event	Gold	Silver	Bronze
Men's singles	(China) Wang Liqin	(China) Ma Lin	(South Korea) Oh Sang-eun
Men's singles	(China) Wang Liqin	(China) Ma Lin	(Denmark) Michael Maze
Women's singles	(China) Zhang Yining	(China) Guo Yan	(Hong Kong) Lin Ling
Women's singles	(China) Zhang Yining	(China) Guo Yan	(China) Guo Yue
Men's doubles	(China) Kong Linghui; Wang Hao	(Germany) Timo Boll; Christian Süß	(China) Chen Qi; Ma Lin
Men's doubles	(China) Kong Linghui; Wang Hao	(Germany) Timo Boll; Christian Süß	(China) Wang Liqin; Yan Sen
Women's doubles	(China) Wang Nan; Zhang Yining	(China) Guo Yue; Niu Jianfeng	(China) Bai Yang; Guo Yan
Women's doubles	(China) Wang Nan; Zhang Yining	(China) Guo Yue; Niu Jianfeng	(Hong Kong) Tie Ya Na; Zhang Rui
Mixed doubles	(China) Wang Liqin; Guo Yue	(China) Liu Guozheng; Bai Yang	(China) Yan Sen; Guo Yan
Mixed doubles	(China) Wang Liqin; Guo Yue	(China) Liu Guozheng; Bai Yang	(China) Qiu Yike; Cao Zhen

== Finals ==
=== Men's singles ===
(China) Wang Liqin def. (China) Ma Lin 4–2: 11–9, 3–11, 8–11, 11–9,11–9, 11–7

=== Women's singles ===
(China) Zhang Yining def. (China) Guo Yan, 4–2: 5–11, 11–7, 11–7, 4–11,11–8, 13–11

=== Men's doubles ===
(China) Kong Linghui / Wang Hao def. (Germany) Timo Boll / Christian Süß, 4–1: 11–9, 11–3, 11–9, 7–11, 11–6

=== Women's doubles ===
(China) Wang Nan / Zhang Yining def. (China) Guo Yue / Niu Jianfeng, 4–1: 11–4, 11–5, 10–12, 11–9,11–5

=== Mixed doubles ===
(China) Wang Liqin / Guo Yue def. (China) Liu Guozheng / Bai Yang, 4–3: 11–4, 6–11, 6–11, 11–7, 11–9, 7–11, 11–6
