= Xintong =

Xintong may refer to:

== People ==
- Huang Xintong, Chinese ice dancer
- Lin Xintong, Chinese swimmer
- Zhao Xintong, Chinese snooker player and current World Champion
- Zhou Xintong, Chinese table tennis player

== Other uses ==
- Xintong Avenue station, a station on the Chengdu Metro
