= Jing Tian-Zörner =

Chinese-German table tennis player

Jing Tian-Zörner (Chinese: 田静; pinyin: Tián Jìng, born 9 February 1963) is a Chinese-born German table tennis player. She represented Germany at the 2000 Summer Olympics.
