= Qianhong Gotsch =

German table tennis player

Qianhong Gotsch-He
Personal information
- Nationality: Germany

Sport
- Sport: Table tennis
Medal record
Women's table tennis
Representing Germany
European Championships
Gold medal – first place	2000 Bremen	Singles
Silver medal – second place	2000 Bremen	Team

Qianhong Gotsch, born He Qianhong, is a female table tennis player from Germany. She won two medals in singles, and team events at the Table Tennis European Championships in 2000. She also won several tournaments of the ITTF Pro Tour. She was announced to play in the 2025/26 season for SV DJK Kolbermoor in the Bundesliga.
