= Li Jia (table tennis) =

Chinese table tennis player

Personal information
- Nationality: China
- Born: 4 May 1981 (age 45)
Medal record
Representing China
World Table Tennis Championships
Bronze medal – third place	2003	Women's Doubles

Li Jia (Chinese: 李佳; born May 4, 1981) is a retired female Chinese table tennis player most active between 2000, and 2003. She was left handed.

From Jinzhou, Liaoning, she began playing table tennis at the age of 7, and was selected for the provincial team in 1990. In 1997, she joined the national team. She was known for her doubles play. She won the world women's club championships in 2000, the national championships (women's doubles), and placed third in the singles competition that year. In 2001, she placed third in singles at Korea Open, and was the champion in doubles. She also placed third on the international circuit competition. In 2002, she placed third in women's doubles at the Egypt Open, but was the champion in the Qatar, Germany, and Netherlands Open competitions. She placed third in women's doubles at the 47th World Table Tennis Championships.
