= Vasile Florea =

Romanian table tennis player

Personal information
- Nationality: Romanian
- Born: 25 October 1967 (age 57); Craiova, Romania

Sport
- Sport: Table tennis

Vasile Florea (born 25 October 1967) is a Romanian table tennis player. He competed in the men's singles event at the 1996 Summer Olympics.
