= Zhou Xintong =

Chinese table tennis player

Personal information
- Nationality: Chinese
- Born: 1 January 1993 (age 32)

Sport
- Sport: Table tennis

Zhou Xintong (born 1 January 1993) is a Chinese table tennis player. Her highest career ITTF ranking was 36.
