= Cheng Hongxia =

Chinese table tennis player

Personal information
- Nationality: China
- Born: 1978 (age 47–48)

Sport
- Sport: Ping Pong/Table Tennis
Medal record
Representing China
World Table Tennis Championships
Bronze medal – third place	1997	Women's Doubles

Cheng Hongxia (born 1978) is a female Chinese former international table tennis player.

She won a bronze medal at the 1997 World Table Tennis Championships in the women's doubles with Wang Hui.

== See also ==
- List of table tennis players
