= Reiko Hiura =

Japanese table tennis player

Personal information
- Nationality: Japanese
- Born: 27 March 1984 (age 41)

Sport
- Sport: Table tennis

Reiko Hiura (born 27 March 1984) is a Japanese table tennis player. Her highest career ITTF ranking was 36.
