= Wang Hui (table tennis) =

Chinese table tennis player

Personal information
- Nationality: China (1978-2008); Japan (2008-)
- Born: 14 September 1978 (age 47)
Medal record
Representing China
World Table Tennis Championships
Bronze medal – third place	1997	Women's Doubles
Gold medal – first place	2000	Women's Team

Wang Hui (Chinese: 王辉, born 1978) is a female Chinese former international table tennis player.

She won a bronze medal at the 1997 World Table Tennis Championships in the women's doubles with Cheng Hongxia and a gold medal at the 2000 World Team Table Tennis Championships.

== See also ==
- List of table tennis players
