= Bai Yang (table tennis) =

Chinese table tennis player

Personal information
- Nationality: China
- Born: 13 June 1984 (age 42) Hebei
Medal record
Representing China
World Table Tennis Championships
Bronze medal – third place	2001	Mixed Doubles
Silver medal – second place	2003	Mixed Doubles
Silver medal – second place	2005	Mixed Doubles
Bronze medal – third place	2005	Women's Doubles

Bai Yang (Chinese: 白杨; born 13. June 1984 in Hebei) is a Chinese international table tennis player.

She has won four World Championship medals. She won the bronze medal at the 2001 World Table Tennis Championships with Zhan Jian, a silver medal at the 2003 World Table Tennis Championships with Liu Guozheng and a silver and bronze at the 2005 World Table Tennis Championships with Liu Guozheng and Guo Yan respectively.

In 2004 she was exiled from the national team following a relationship with fellow international Ma Lin.

== See also ==
- List of table tennis players
