= Akira Kito =

Japanese table tennis player

Personal information
- Nationality: Japanese
- Born: 10 September 1974 (age 51)

Sport
- Sport: Table tennis

Akira Kito (born 10 September 1974) is a Japanese table tennis player. He competed in the men's doubles event at the 2004 Summer Olympics, with Toshio Tasaki as his partner. They were eliminated in Round 3.
