= Karl Jindrak =

Austrian table tennis player

Personal information
- Nationality: Austrian
- Born: 10 December 1972 (age 53) Vienna, Austria

Sport
- Sport: Table tennis

Karl Jindrak (born 10 December 1972) is an Austrian table tennis player. He competed at the 1996 Summer Olympics, the 2000 Summer Olympics, and the 2004 Summer Olympics.
