= Werner Schlager =

Austrian table tennis player

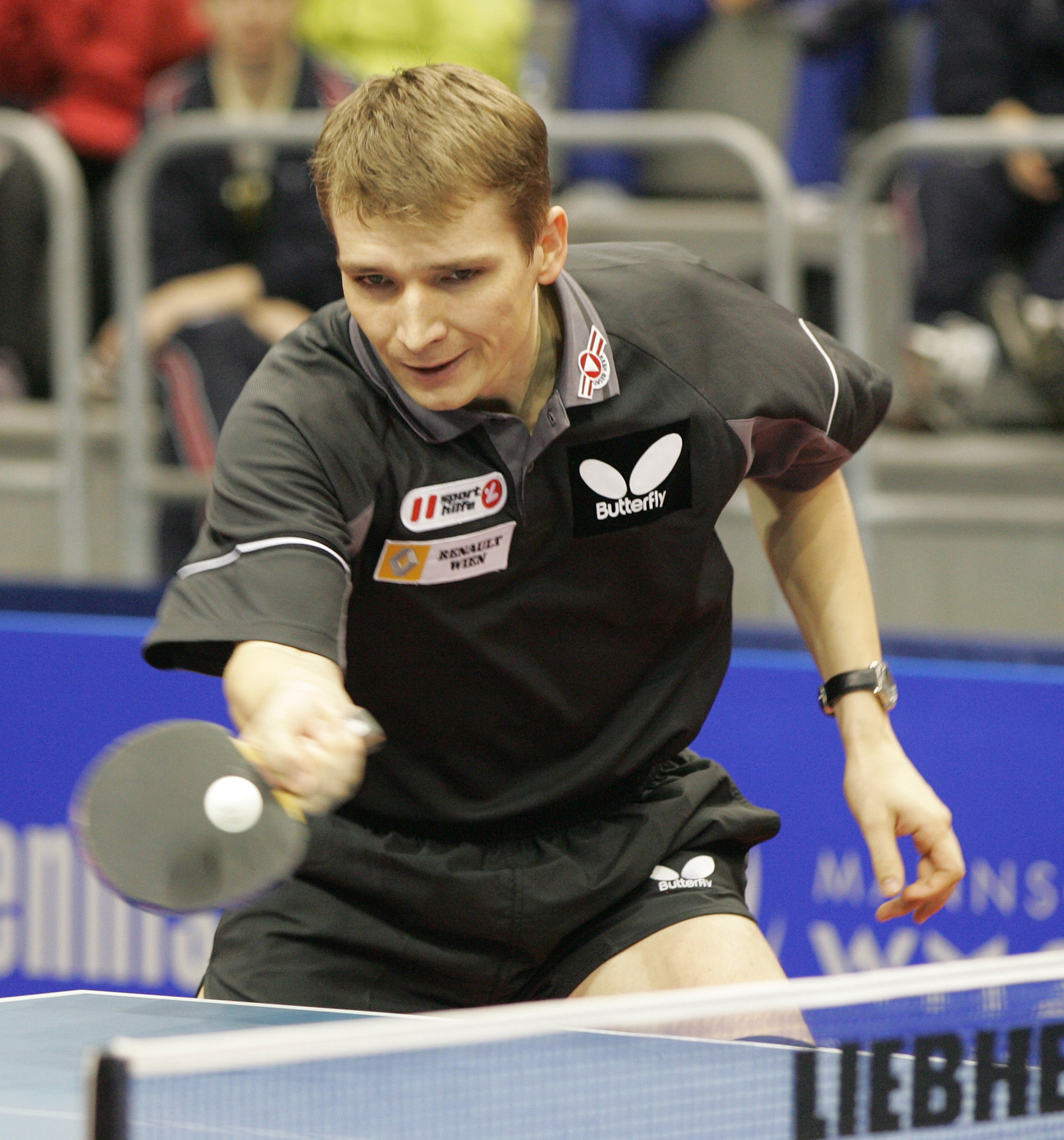

Personal information
- Full name: Werner Schlager
- Nationality: Austria
- Born: 28 September 1972 (age 53) Wiener Neustadt, Austria
- Height: 1.76 m (5 ft 9 in)
- Weight: 70 kg (154 lb; 11 st 0 lb)

Sport
- Sport: Table tennis
- Club: SVS Niederösterreich
- Playing style: Shakehand grip
- Highest ranking: 1 (June 2003)
Medal record
Men's table tennis
Representing Austria
World Championships
Gold medal – first place	2003 Paris	Singles
Bronze medal – third place	1999 Eindhoven	Singles
World Cup
Silver medal – second place	1999 Xiaolan	Singles

Werner Schlager (born 28 September 1972 in Wiener Neustadt, Austria) is a table tennis player and former world champion from Austria.

== Career ==
Schlager began playing table tennis when he was six years old, learning from his father, Rudolph Schlager and brother, Harald Schlager who were also top Austrian players, making them ideal training partners. In fact, starting out, Schlager became well-versed playing both with and against long pips like his brother. After placing top in numerous singles and doubles tournaments, he won the 2003 Singles World Championship held in Paris beating South Korean Joo Se-Hyuk in the final to clinch the world title.

Werner Schlager was renowned for his skill in service and receiving, which was one of the biggest contributors to his success. His serves were patently legal, and relied on creativity rather than trying to hide the ball. His serving has been admired and praised by the likes of Liu Guoliang. In an interview, after being asked about how he creates his serves, he responded ''I dream about them''. Schlager was also well known for having a third ball attack that worked in unison with his serves. His style is very aggressive and fast, as he plays many blocks and counter-hits, as opposed to slower strokes. He had a very good forehand and backhand. He was respected by the Chinese players for his serve and third ball. Schlager is also well known for being a tactical and intellectual player.

In the quarter-final of the 2003 World Table Tennis Championships, he came up against one of the top seeds in the tournament and former world champion; Wang Liqin. After being 3-1 down in games, he evened it up at 3–2, and then proceeded to save 4 match points at 6-10 down. He took that game 13–11. With the games at 3-3, Werner Schlager took game 7 convincingly at 11-5 and progressed onto the semi-finals. He then faced Kong Linghui, and managed to save a match point at 12–11 in the final game. He then took the game 14-12 and consequently the match. In the final, he played against South Korean chopper, Joo Sae-hyuk, which he won quite convincingly at 4–2. He said this win was attributed to the fact that he has had a lot of experience against this kind of style, as he constantly played with Chen Weixing, a fellow Austrian national team member. When asked about his surprising performance, Schlager commented, "I can tell you the secret for my World Championship title in the year 2003...I was in love and you know and this is also opens many many doors and makes many things possible."

He therefore is the first Austrian since Richard Bergmann in 1937 to win the World Championship Singles. That year, he was voted Austrian Sportsman of the Year and selected in China as "The most popular foreign sportsman".

In 2009, he founded the Werner Schlager Academy in Schwechat close to Vienna, a training centre which is also home to clubs SVS Niederösterreich and SVS Ströck. Schlager published his book in 2011, Table Tennis: Tips from a World Champion.

== Tournament history and credentials ==
Singles (as of August 25, 2010)

- Olympics: QF (2000).
- World Championships: winner (2003); SF (1999).
- World Cup appearances: 10. Record: runner-up (1999).
- Pro Tour winner (×4): 1996 Australia Open; 2002 Brazil, Korea Open; 2004 Croatian Open.
  Runner-up (×7): 1999 Croatian Open; 2000 Danish Open; 2001 German Open; 2002 Polish Open; 2004 Egypt, Brazil Open; 2005 Croatian Open.
- Pro Tour Grand Finals appearances: 11. Record: SF (1999).
- European Championships: runner-up (2009); SF (2002, 08, 10).
- Europe Top-12: 1st (2000, 08); 2nd (2004, 06); 3rd (2003).

Men's doubles

- Olympics: QF (2000).
- World Championships: QF (1997, 99, 2003).
- Pro Tour winner (×11): 1996 English, USA, Australia Open; 1997 Polish Open; 1998 Croatian Open; 1999 Australia, Czech Open; 2000 Danish Open; 2001 Brazil Open; 2002 Brazil Open; 2005 Russian Open; 2006 German Open.
  Runner-up (×7): 1997 Australia Open; 1999 Brazil Open; 2000 Polish Open; 2003 Qatar, German Open; 2004 Croatian, Egypt Open.
- Pro Tour Grand Finals appearances: 10. Record: SF (1999).
- European Championships: winner (2005); runner-up (2008); SF (1998, 2000, 03, 07).

Mixed doubles

- World Championships: QF (2005).
- European Championships: winner (2003); SF (2002, 05).

Team

- Olympics: 4th (2008).
- World Championships: 5th (2001).
- World Team Cup: 3rd (2007).
- European Championships: 2nd (2005).

== Personal life ==
Schlager and Bettina Mueller have two children, a boy, Nick Neo in 2009 and a girl, Nea Nika in 2012.

== Honours and awards ==
- 2000 Decoration of Merit in Gold of the Republic of Austria
- 2003 Decoration of Honour in Gold of the Republic of Austria
- 2003 Austrian Sportspersonality of the year
- 2003 55-cent stamp issued bearing the image of Schlager

Sporting positions
Preceded by (China) Wang Liqin	World Table Tennis Champion; 2003	Succeeded by (China) Wang Liqin
