= Hao Shuai =

Chinese table tennis player

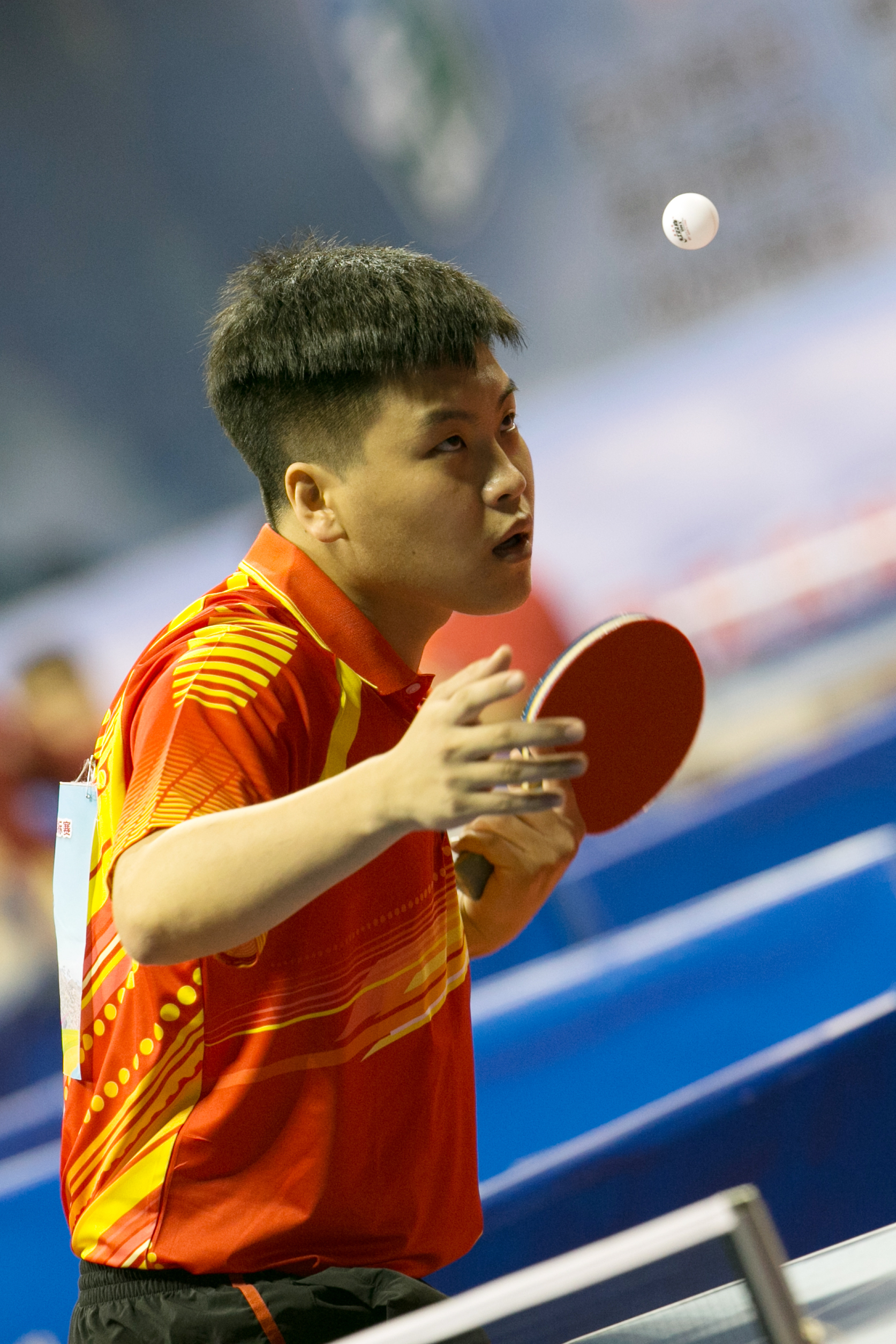
- Hao Shuai in 2016

Personal information
- Full name: Hao Shuai
- Nationality: China
- Born: 1 October 1983 (age 42) Tianjin, China
- Height: 1.74 m (5 ft 8 1/2 in)
- Weight: 69 kg (152 lb; 10.9 st)

Sport
- Sport: Table tennis
- Playing style: Left-handed, shakehand grip
- Highest ranking: 7 (September 2009)
Medal record
Men's table tennis
Representing China
World Championships
Silver medal – second place	2013 Paris	Doubles
Silver medal – second place	2011 Rotterdam	Mixed Doubles
Bronze medal – third place	2009 Yokohama	Doubles
Bronze medal – third place	2009 Yokohama	Mixed Doubles
World Cup
Gold medal – first place	2010 Dubai	Team

Hao Shuai
- Traditional Chinese: 郝帥
- Simplified Chinese: 郝帅
Transcriptions
Standard Mandarin
- Hanyu Pinyin: Hǎo Shuài

Hao Shuai (born October 1, 1983 in Tianjin) is a Chinese table tennis player.

== Career records ==
Singles (as of May 13, 2010)

- World Championships: QF (2005, 2007).
- Pro Tour winner (3): Serbian Open 2007. China (Shanghai) Open 2008. Slovenian Open 2009.
  Runner-up (3): Malaysia Open 2003. China (Tianjin), Korea Open 2009.
- Pro Tour Grand Finals appearances: 3. Record: runner-up (2003).
- Asian Championships: SF (2005).
- Asian Cup: 2nd (2000, 2005).

Men's doubles

- World Championships: SF (2009).
- Pro Tour winner (5): Slovenian, China (Guangzhou) Open 2006. China (Tianjin), Korea Open 2009. German Open 2011.
  Runner-up (5): Japan Open 2003. China (Kunshan) Open 2006. Kuwait, Qatar Open 2009. German Open 2010.
- Pro Tour Grand Finals appearances: 3. Record: winner (2006). SF (2003, 2007).
- Asian Championships: winner (2007).

Mixed doubles

- World Championships: Runner-up (2011). SF (2009).
- Asian Championships: QF (2005, 2007).

Teams

- Asian Games: winner (2006)
- Asian Championships: winner (2005, 2007).
