= Li Nan (table tennis) =

Chinese table tennis player

Personal information
- Full name: Li Nan
- Nationality: China

Sport
- Sport: Table tennis
Medal record
Women's table tennis
Representing China
World Championships
Bronze medal – third place	2003 Paris	Mixed Doubles
Bronze medal – third place	1999 Eindhoven	Singles
World Cup
Silver medal – second place	2002 Singapore	Singles
Asian Championships
Silver medal – second place	2003 Bangkok	Singles
Gold medal – first place	2003 Bangkok	Doubles
Gold medal – first place	2003 Bangkok	Mixed Doubles
Gold medal – first place	2003 Bangkok	Team
Silver medal – second place	2000 Doha	Singles
Gold medal – first place	2000 Doha	Team

Li Nan is a table tennis player from China. From 2000 to 2003 she won several medals in the World Table Tennis Championships and the Asian Championships.

== See also ==
- List of table tennis players
