= Qin Zhijian =

Chinese table tennis player

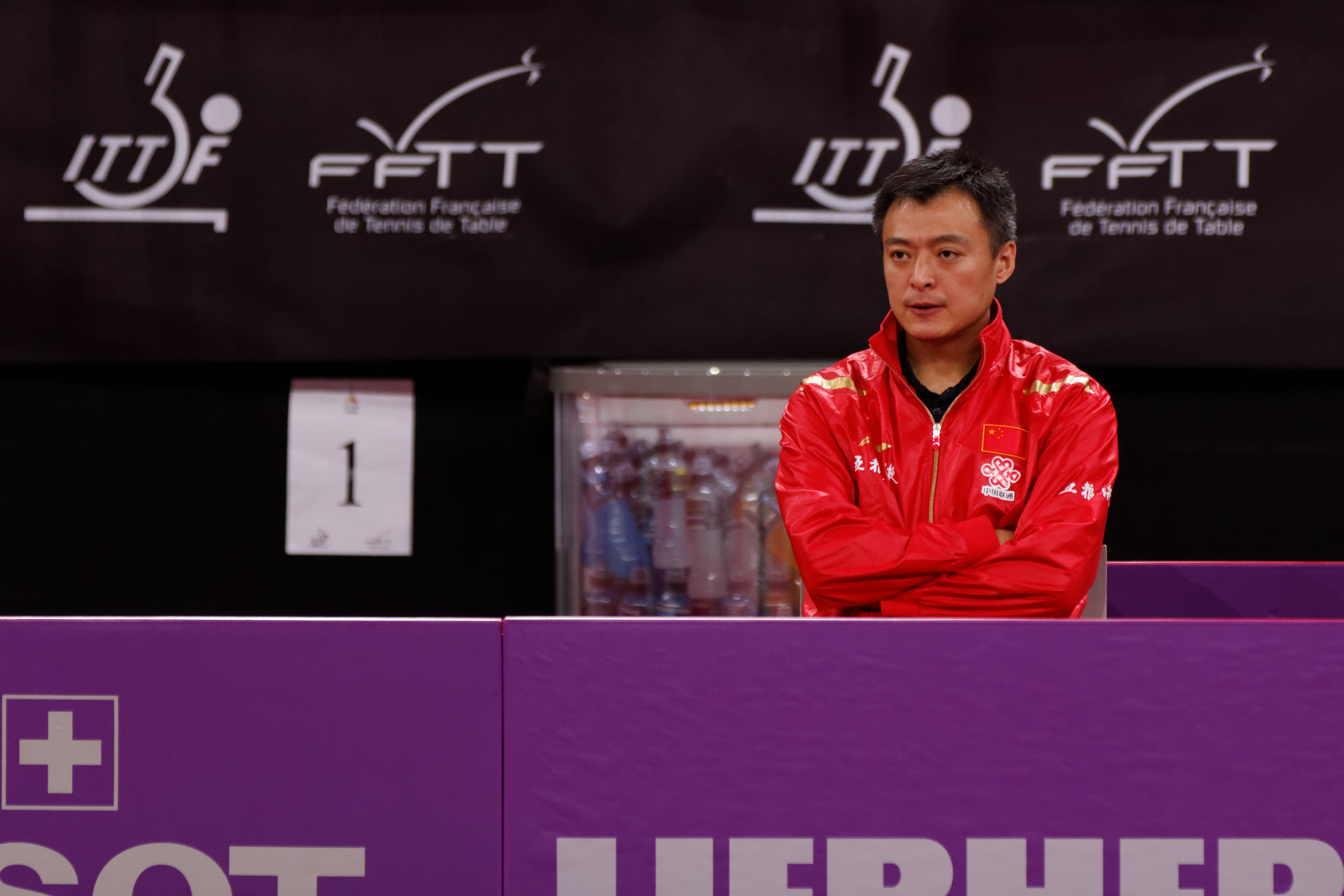
- Qin Zhijian in 2013

Personal information
- Nationality: China
- Born: 5 October 1976 (age 49)
Medal record
Representing China
World Table Tennis Championships
Bronze medal – third place	1999	Mixed Doubles
Gold medal – first place	2001	Mixed Doubles
Bronze medal – third place	2003	Mixed Doubles
Bronze medal – third place	2003	Men's Doubles

Qin Zhijian (born 1976) is a former male Chinese international table tennis player and current coach.

== Playing career ==
He has won four World Championship medals. He won the bronze medal in the mixed doubles at the 1999 World Table Tennis Championships, a gold medal in the mixed doubles at the 2001 World Table Tennis Championships with Yang Ying and two bronze medals at the 2003 World Table Tennis Championships in the men's doubles and mixed doubles with Ma Lin and Niu Jianfeng, respectively.

== Coaching ==
In 2017 he became the China national men's table tennis team's first team coach. He was replaced by Wang Hao in early 2023. Before that, he was the personal coach of Ma Long since 2006 who he developed and trained into a Grand Slam Champion.

== See also ==
- List of table tennis players
