= Yan Sen =

Chinese table tennis player

Personal information
- Full name: Yan Sen
- Nationality: China
- Born: 16 August 1975 (age 51) Jiangsu, China

Sport
- Sport: Table tennis
- Playing style: Penholder grip
Medal record
Men's table tennis
Representing China
Olympic Games
Gold medal – first place	2000 Sydney	Doubles

Yan Sen (阎森; born August 16, 1975) is a retired Chinese table tennis player.

== Major performances ==
- 1996 ITTF Pro Tour Grand Finals - 1st doubles
- 1997 Yugoslavian Open - 1st doubles
- 1997 World Championships in Manchester - bronze singles
- 1998 Asian Games - 1st team
- 1998 Asian Championships - 1st team
- 1999 World Championships - 2nd doubles (with Wang Liqin), 5th mixed doubles
- 2000 Sydney Olympic Games - 1st doubles (with Wang Liqin)
- 2000 World Men's Club Championships - 1st team
- 2001 ITTF Pro Tour Grand Finals - 1st doubles (with Wang Liqin)
- 2001 World Championships - 1st doubles (with Wang Liqin)
- 2002 Qatar Open - 1st doubles
- 2002 Asian Games - 1st team; 3rd doubles
- 2003 World Championships - 1st doubles
