= Liu Guozheng =

Chinese table tennis player

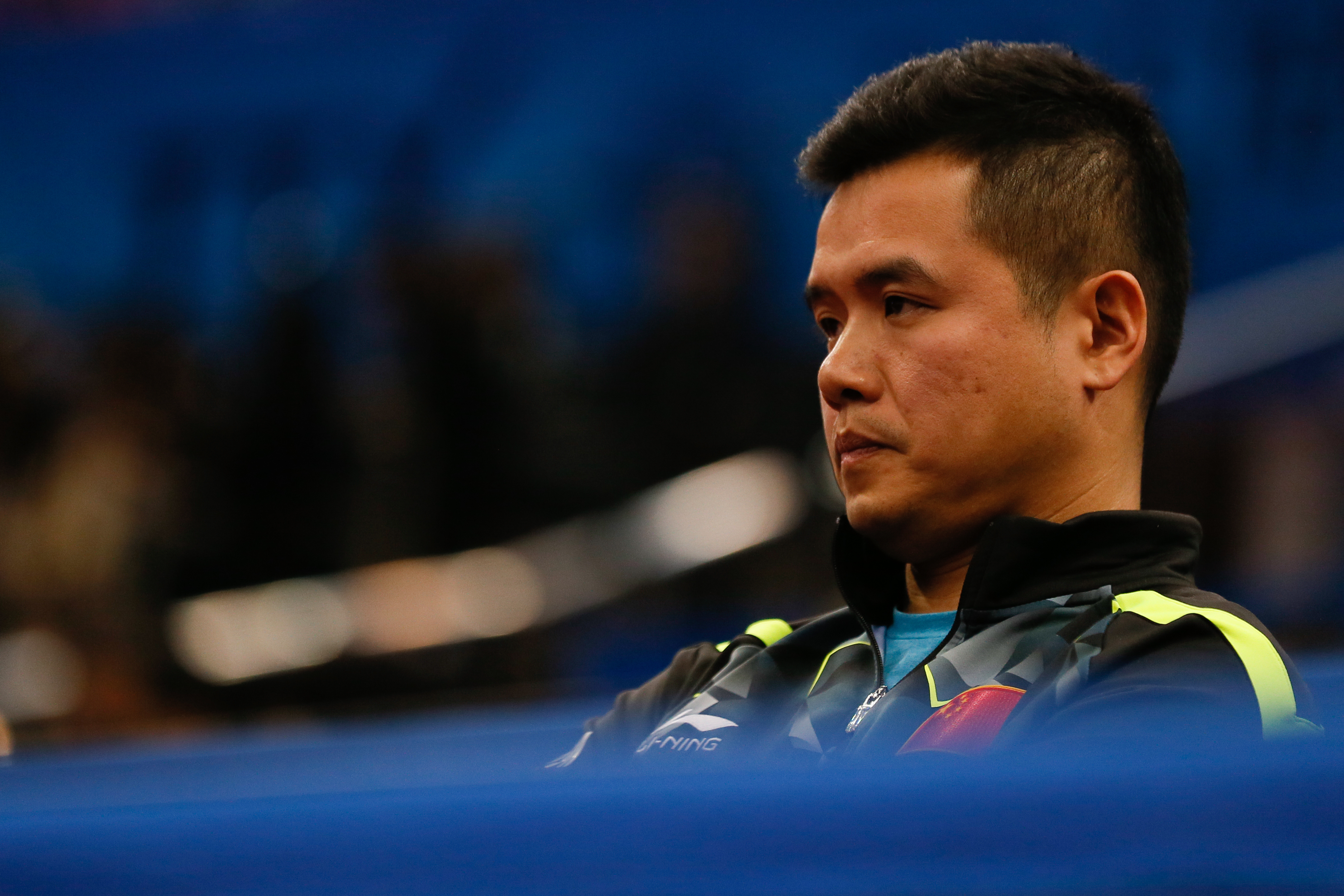

Personal information
- Nationality: China
- Born: 7 March 1980 (age 46) Wuhan, Hubei, China

Sport
- Sport: Table tennis
- Playing style: Ultimate
Medal record
Men's table tennis
Representing China
World Table Tennis Championships
Gold medal – first place	2001 Osaka	Team
Gold medal – first place	2004 Doha	Team
Silver medal – second place	2000 Kuala Lumpur	Team
Silver medal – second place	2003 Paris	Mixed
Silver medal – second place	2005 Shanghai	Mixed

Liu Guozheng (Simplified Chinese: 刘国正, March 7, 1980 in Hubei) is a retired Chinese table tennis player. From 2000 to 2005 he won several medals in singles, doubles, and team events in the Asian Table Tennis Championships and in the World Table Tennis Championships.

== Career ==
In 2003 Paris World Table Tennis Championships, he was eliminated in the second round by Petr Korbel.
