= Wang Nan (table tennis) =

Chinese table tennis player

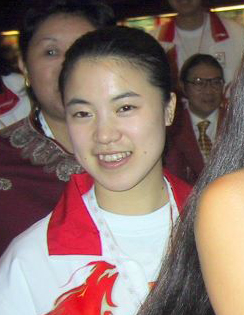
- Wang Nan in 2001 in Moscow after China was awarded the Olympics

Personal information
- Native name: 王楠
- Nicknames: Nan Nan (楠楠), Nan Jie (楠姐)
- Nationality: China
- Born: 23 October 1978 (age 47) Fushun, Liaoning, China
- Height: 1.62 m (5 ft 4 in)

Sport
- Sport: Table tennis
- Playing style: Shakehand grip
- Highest ranking: 1 (January 1999)
Medal record
Women's table tennis
Representing China
Event	1st	2nd	3rd
Olympic Games	4	1	0
World Championships	15	3	2
World Cup	5	2	0
Total	24	6	2
Olympic Games
Gold medal – first place	2000 Sydney	Singles
Gold medal – first place	2000 Sydney	Doubles
Gold medal – first place	2004 Athens	Doubles
Gold medal – first place	2008 Beijing	Team
Silver medal – second place	2008 Beijing	Singles
World Championships
Gold medal – first place	1997 Manchester	Team
Gold medal – first place	1999 Eindhoven	Singles
Gold medal – first place	1999 Eindhoven	Doubles
Gold medal – first place	2000 Kuala Lumpur	Team
Gold medal – first place	2001 Osaka	Singles
Gold medal – first place	2001 Osaka	Doubles
Gold medal – first place	2001 Osaka	Team
Gold medal – first place	2003 Paris	Singles
Gold medal – first place	2003 Paris	Doubles
Gold medal – first place	2003 Paris	Mixed doubles
Gold medal – first place	2004 Doha	Team
Gold medal – first place	2005 Shanghai	Doubles
Gold medal – first place	2006 Bremen	Team
Gold medal – first place	2007 Zagreb	Doubles
Gold medal – first place	2008 Guangzhou	Team
Silver medal – second place	1997 Manchester	Singles
Silver medal – second place	1997 Manchester	Doubles
Silver medal – second place	2007 Zagreb	Mixed doubles
Bronze medal – third place	1997 Manchester	Mixed doubles
Bronze medal – third place	1999 Eindhoven	Mixed doubles
World Cup
Gold medal – first place	1997 Shanghai	Singles
Gold medal – first place	1998 Taipei	Singles
Gold medal – first place	2003 Hong Kong	Singles
Gold medal – first place	2007 Chengdu	Singles
Gold medal – first place	2007 Magdeburg	Team
Silver medal – second place	2000 Phnom Penh	Singles
Silver medal – second place	2004 Hangzhou	Singles
Asian Games
Gold medal – first place	1998 Bangkok	Singles
Gold medal – first place	1998 Bangkok	Doubles
Gold medal – first place	1998 Bangkok	Mixed doubles
Gold medal – first place	1998 Bangkok	Team
Gold medal – first place	2006 Doha	Mixed doubles
Gold medal – first place	2006 Doha	Team
Silver medal – second place	2002 Busan	Singles
Silver medal – second place	2002 Busan	Team
Bronze medal – third place	2002 Busan	Doubles
Bronze medal – third place	2002 Busan	Mixed doubles
Bronze medal – third place	2006 Doha	Singles
Bronze medal – third place	2006 Doha	Doubles

Wang Nan (Chinese: 王楠; pinyin: Wáng Nán; born October 23, 1978, in Fushun, Liaoning) is a female Chinese table tennis player from Liaoning. Wang was ranked world #1 on the ITTF ranking system from January 1999 to November 2002. She is left-handed, and began playing table tennis when she was seven years old. Her particular skills are changing the placement of the ball during rallies and her loop drive, as well as her notable speed. Wang has been the leader of the women's table-tennis team of China after Deng Yaping's retirement. In terms of achievements, she is one of the most successful female table tennis players (alongside Li Xiaoxia, Deng Yaping, Ding Ning, Zhang Yining) having won the gold medal in each of the Table Tennis World Cup, the Table Tennis World Championships, and the Olympic Games.

== Personal life ==
Wang Nan is married to Guo Bin.

== Career performance ==
In 1994 Wang Nan won the women's singles titles at the Swedish Open. The nex, Women's World Table Tennis Cup and Olympic Games. From 1997 to 1998 she won the Women's World Table Tennis Cup twice, as well as the American Open and China Open. At the 1998 Asian Games in Bangkok, Wang won the four gold medals on offer (singles, doubles, mixed doubles and women teams). At the end of 1998, she won the ITTF tour finals.

In 1999 she won the gold medal at the World Table Tennis Championships and the ITTF tour finals in both singles and doubles. She became world #1 in the same year. In the 2000 Summer Olympics in Sydney she won two gold medals in singles and doubles. Her excellent success record has resulted in her becoming a Grand-Slam champion.

However, in the 2002 Asian Games in Busan, she lost two finals in the singles and women's teams competitions, winning no gold medals. Many people criticized her attitude and observed that she was inactive and lacking confidence. A lot of rumors claimed that she was going to retire because her skills were depleted and she could not compete on the improving world stage.

Wang Nan attended 2003 World Table Tennis Championships in Paris. This is her fourth time representing China. She won three gold medals in singles, doubles and mixed doubles and of particular interest, she won both singles and doubles championship for the third time in a row, records which are hard to break in the future. Many people didn't expect her success before the competition began; however, the three gold medals proved that she was still one of the top players in the world.

At the 2004 Summer Olympics Wang Nan failed to retain her singles crown but went on to win the women's doubles with Zhang Yining.

Four years later at the 2008 Summer Olympics she made it to the Women's Final yet again, this time losing out to Zhang Yining, 8–11, 13–11, 11–8, 11–8, 11–3. She did, however, win the team gold for the host country.

== Performance timelines ==
Key
W	F	SF	QF	#R	RR	Q#	P#	DNQ	A	Z#	PO	G	S	B	NMS	NTI	P	NH

(W) winner; (F) finalist; (SF) semifinalist; (QF) quarterfinalist; (#R) rounds 4, 3, 2, 1; (RR) round-robin stage; (Q#) qualification round; (P#) preliminary round; (DNQ) did not qualify; (A) absent; (Z#) Davis/Fed Cup Zonal Group (with number indication) or (PO) play-off; (G) gold, (S) silver or (B) bronze Olympic/Paralympic medal; (NMS) not a Masters tournament; (NTI) not a Tier I tournament; (P) postponed; (NH) not held; (SR) strike rate (events won / competed); (W–L) win–loss record.
To avoid confusion and double counting, these charts are updated at the conclusion of a tournament or when the player's participation has ended.

Tournament	1994	1995	1996	1997	1998	1999	2000	2001	2002	2003	2004	2005	2006	2007	2008	SR	W–L	Win%
Summer Olympics
Singles	NH		A	Not Held			G	Not Held			QF	Not Held			S	1 / 3	11–2	85%
Doubles	NH		A	Not Held			G	Not Held			G	Not Held				2 / 2	8–0	100%
Team	Not Held														G	1 / 1	5–0	100%
Win–loss	0–0	0–0	0–0	0–0	0–0	0–0	9–0	0–0	0–0	0–0	6–1	0–0	0–0	0–0	9–1	4 / 6	24–2	92%
World Championships
Singles	NH	QF	NH	F	NH	W	NH	W	NH	W	NH	3R	NH	QF	NH	3 / 7	37–4	90%
Doubles	NH	A	NH	F	NH	W	NH	W	NH	W	NH	W	NH	W	NH	5 / 6	34–1	97%
Mixed doubles	NH	1R	NH	SF	NH	SF	NH	3R	NH	W	NH	QF	NH	F	NH	1 / 7	27–6	82%
Team	NH	A	NH	W	NH		W	W	NH		W	NH	W	NH	W	6 / 6	45–0	100%
Win–loss	0–0	4–2	0–0	22–3	0–0	18–1	8–0	21–1	0–0	19–0	7–0	12–2	8–0	16–2	8–0	15 / 26	143–11	93%
World Cup
Singles	NH		A	W	W	NH	F	RR	A	W	F	A		W	A	4 / 7	31–3	90%
Team	A		NH											W	NH	1 / 1	5–0	100%
Win–loss	0–0	0–0	0–0	6–0	5–1	0–0	5–1	0–3	0–0	5–1	4–2	0–0	0–0	11–0	0–0	5 / 8	36–3	93%
ITTF Pro Tour Grand Finals
Singles	NH		QF	F	W	QF	F	W	A	SF	SF	A	QF	QF	A	2 / 10	22–8	73%
Doubles	NH		QF	W	W	W	SF	A	A	F	W	A	W	A	A	5 / 8	18–3	100%
Win–loss	0–0	0–0	1–2	6–1	7–0	4–1	4–2	4–0	0–0	4–2	5–1	0–0	4–1	1–1	0–0	7 / 18	40–11	78%
Tournament of Champions
Singles	NH												F	W	A	1 / 2	5–1	83%
Win–loss	0–0	0–0	0–0	0–0	0–0	0–0	0–0	0–0	0–0	0–0	0–0	0–0	2–1	3–0	0–0	1 / 2	5–1	83%
Career Statistics
	1994	1995	1996	1997	1998	1999	2000	2001	2002	2003	2004	2005	2006	2007	2008	Career Total		
Pro Tour Singles Titles	1	1	0	2	1	2	3	3	2	0	1	0	1	1	0	18		
Pro Tour Doubles Titles	0	0	1	1	2	1	0	0	0	2	2	0	4	3	0	16		
Pro Tour Team Titles	1	0	0	0	0	0	0	0	0	0	0	0	0	0	2	3		
Year-end ranking	NR	8	5	3	3	1	1	1	1	2	3	7	3	2	4			

== World Title Events Finals (24–6) ==
Legend
Olympics (4–1)
World Championships (15–3)
World Cup (5–2)

=== Team (8–0) ===
Result	W–L	Year	Tournament	Location	Partners	Opponents	Score
Win	1–0	1997	World Championships (1)	Manchester, United Kingdom	(China) Deng Yaping (China) Li Ju (China) Wang Hui (China) Yang Ying	(North Korea) Kim Hyon-hui (North Korea) Tu Jong-sil (North Korea) Wi Bok-Sun	3–0
Win	2–0	2000	World Championships (2)	Kuala Lumpur, Malaysia	(China) Li Ju (China) Sun Jin (China) Wang Hui (China) Zhang Yining	(Chinese Taipei) Chen Jing (Chinese Taipei) Lu Yun-feng (Chinese Taipei) Pan Li-chun (Chinese Taipei) Tsui Hsiu-li (Chinese Taipei) Xu Jing	3–1
Win	3–0	2001	World Championships (3)	Osaka, Japan	(China) Li Ju (China) Sun Jin (China) Yang Ying (China) Zhang Yining	(North Korea) Kim Hyang-Mi (North Korea) Kim Hyon-hui (North Korea) Kim Mi-Yong (North Korea) Kim Yun-Mi (North Korea) Tu Jong-sil	3–0
Win	4–0	2004	World Championships (4)	Doha, Qatar	(China) Zhang Yining (China) Guo Yue (China) Niu Jianfeng (China) Li Ju	(Hong Kong) Lau Sui-fei (Hong Kong) Song Ah Sim (Hong Kong) Zhang Rui (Hong Kong) Tie Ya Na (Hong Kong) Yu Kwok See	3–0
Win	5–0	2006	World Championships (5)	Bremen, Germany	(China) Zhang Yining (China) Guo Yue (China) Guo Yan (China) Li Xiaoxia	(Hong Kong) Lau Sui-fei (Hong Kong) Lin Ling (Hong Kong) Zhang Rui (Hong Kong) Tie Ya Na (Hong Kong) Yu Kwok See	3–1
Win	6–0	2007	World Cup (1)	Magdeburg, Germany	(China) Guo Yue (China) Li Xiaoxia (China) Zhang Yining	(South Korea) Kim Kyung-ah (South Korea) Kwak Bang-bang (South Korea) Lee Eun-hee (South Korea) Park Mi-Young	3–0
Win	7–0	2008	World Championships (6)	Guangzhou, China	(China) Guo Yan (China) Guo Yue (China) Li Xiaoxia (China) Zhang Yining	(Singapore) Feng Tianwei (Singapore) Li Jiawei (Singapore) Wang Yuegu (Singapore) Sun Beibei (Singapore) Yu Mengyu	3–1
Win	8–0	2008	Summer Olympic Games (1)	Beijing, China	(China) Zhang Yining (China) Guo Yue	(Singapore) Feng Tianwei (Singapore) Li Jiawei (Singapore) Wang Yuegu	3–0

=== Singles (8–4) ===
Result	W–L	Year	Tournament	Location	Opponent	Score
Loss	0–1	1997	World Championships (1)	Manchester, United Kingdom	(China) Deng Yaping	21–12, 8–21, 11–21, 10–21
Win	1–1	1997	World Cup (1)	Shanghai, China	(China) Li Ju	21–15, 17–21, 21–23, 21–16, 21–17
Win	2–1	1998	World Cup (2)	Taipei, Taiwan	(China) Li Ju	21–12, 21–15, 21–16
Win	3–1	1999	World Championships (1)	Eindhoven, Netherlands	(China) Zhang Yining	15–21, 14–21, 21–5, 21–12, 21–11
Win	4–1	2000	Summer Olympic Games (1)	Sydney, Australia	(China) Li Ju	21–12, 12–21, 19–21, 21–17, 21–18
Loss	4–2	2000	World Cup (1)	Phnom Penh, Cambodia	(China) Li Ju	10–21, 22–20, 17–21, 16–21
Win	5–2	2001	World Championships (2)	Osaka, Japan	(China) Lin Ling	14–21, 21–12, 21–12, 21–19
Win	6–2	2003	World Championships (3)	Paris, France	(China) Zhang Yining	11–7, 11–8, 11–4, 5–11, 6–11, 8–11, 11–5
Win	7–2	2003	World Cup (3)	Hong Kong	(China) Niu Jianfeng	11–9, 11–9, 6–11, 11–4, 11–6
Loss	7–3	2004	World Cup (2)	Hangzhou, China	(China) Zhang Yining	13–15, 11–7, 5–11, 6–11, 11–8, 8–11
Win	8–3	2007	World Cup (4)	Chengdu, China	(China) Zhang Yining	11–5, 8–11, 11–8, 11–6, 11–8
Loss	8–4	2008	Summer Olympic Games (1)	Beijing, China	(China) Zhang Yining	11–8, 11–13, 8–11, 8–11, 3–11

=== Doubles (7–1) ===
Result	W–L	Year	Tournament	Location	Partner	Opponents	Score
Loss	0–1	1997	World Championships (1)	Manchester, United Kingdom	(China) Li Ju	(China) Deng Yapin (China) Yang Ying	17–21, 20–22, 21–17, 21–19, 11–21
Win	1–1	1999	World Championships (1)	Eindhoven, Netherlands	(China) Li Ju	(China) Sun Jin (China) Yang Ying	22–20, 21–18, 21–19
Win	2–1	2000	Summer Olympic Games (1)	Sydney, Australia	(China) Li Ju	(China) Sun Jin (China) Yang Ying	21–18, 21–11, 21–11
Win	3–1	2001	World Championships (2)	Osaka, Japan	(China) Li Ju	(China) Sun Jin (China) Yang Ying	21–16, 21–14, 21–14
Win	4–1	2003	World Championships (3)	Paris, France	(China) Zhang Yining	(China) Guo Yue (China) Niu Jianfeng	11–7, 11–7, 7–11, 11–2, 14–12
Win	5–1	2004	Summer Olympic Games (2)	Athens, Greece	(China) Zhang Yining	(South Korea) Lee Eun-Sil (South Korea) Seok Eun-Mi	11–9, 11–7, 11–6, 11–6
Win	6–1	2005	World Championships (4)	Shanghai, China	(China) Zhang Yining	(China) Guo Yue (China) Niu Jianfeng	11–4, 11–5, 10–12, 11–9, 11–5
Win	7–1	2007	World Championships (5)	Zagreb, Croatia	(China) Zhang Yining	(China) Guo Yue (China) Li Xiaoxia	11–5, 11–6, 13–11, 11–9

=== Mixed Doubles (1–1) ===
Result	W–L	Year	Tournament	Location	Partner	Opponents	Score
Win	1–0	2003	World Championships (1)	Paris, France	(China) Ma Lin	(China) Bai Yang (China) Liu Guozheng	9–11, 10–12, 11–0, 11–7, 11–9, 5–11, 11–8
Loss	1–1	2007	World Championships (1)	Zagreb, Croatia	(China) Ma Lin	(China) Guo Yue (China) Wang Liqin	11–13, 7–11, 11–8, 9–11, 11–9, 10–12

== Other significant finals ==
=== ITTF Pro Tour Grand Finals (7–3) ===
==== Singles: 4 (2–2) ====
Result	W–L	Year	Location	Opponent	Score
Loss	0–1	1997	Hong Kong	(China) Li Ju	25–23, 5–21, 16–21, 17–21
Win	1–1	1998	Paris, France	(China) Lin Ling	21–23, 21–18, 19–21, 22–20, 21–9
Loss	1–2	2000	Kobe, Japan	(China) Zhang Yining	10–21, 21–19, 24–26, 21–9, 11–21
Win	2–2	2001	Hainan, China	(China) Niu Jianfeng	11–6, 11–9, 9–11, 9–11, 11–3, 11–1

==== Doubles: 6 (5–1) ====
Result	W–L	Year	Location	Partner	Opponents	Score
Win	1–0	1997	Hong Kong	(China) Li Ju	(South Korea) Kim Moo-kyo (South Korea) Park Hae-jung	21–17, 21–13, 9–21, 21–13
Win	2–0	1998	Paris, France	(China) Li Ju	(China) Cheng Hongxia (China) Wang Hui	23–21, 22–20, 21–7
Win	3–0	1999	Sydney, Australia	(China) Li Ju	(China) Sun Jin (China) Yang Ying	21–9, 21–12, 19–21, 21–18
Loss	3–1	2003	Guangzhou, China	(China) Zhang Yining	(China) Guo Yue (China) Niu Jianfeng	11–9, 3–11, 4–11, 11–3, 7–11, 11–6, 8–11
Win	4–1	2004	Beijing, China	(China) Zhang Yining	(China) Guo Yue (China) Niu Jianfeng	11–6, 11–7, 11–3, 8–11, 14–12
Win	5–1	2006	Hong Kong	(China) Zhang Yining	(United States) Gao Jun (Spain) Shen Yanfei	11–6, 8–11, 11–9, 11–8, 12–10

=== Tournament of Champions (1–1) ===
Result	W–L	Year	Location	Opponent	Score
Loss	0–1	2006	Changsha, China	(China) Zhang Yining	9–11, 7–11, 8–11, 4–11
Win	1–1	2007	Changsha, China	(China) Li Xiaoxia	11–5, 9–11, 12–10, 11–6, 6–11, 6–11, 11–9

== Pro Tour Titles (37) ==
=== Team (3) ===
No.	Year	Tournament Location
1.	1994	Norrköping, Sweden
2.	2008	Changchun, China
3.	2008	Yokohama, Japan

=== Singles (18) ===
No.	Year	Tournament Location
1.	1994	Norrköping, Sweden
2.	1995	Shantou, China
3.	1997	Fort Lauderdale, United States
4.	1997	Beirut, Lebanon
5.	1998	Jinan, China
6.	1999	Kobe, Japan
7.	1999	Bremen, Germany
8.	2000	Kobe, Japan
9.	2000	Fort Lauderdale, United States
10.	2000	Rio de Janeiro, Brazil
11.	2001	Hainan, China
12.	2001	Seoul, South Korea
13.	2001	Yokohama, Japan
14.	2002	Doha, Qatar
15.	2002	Qingdao, China
16.	2004	Athens, Greece
17.	2006	Kunshan, China
18.	2007	Chiba, Japan

=== Doubles (16) ===
No.	Year	Tournament Location
1.	1996	Belgrade, Yugoslavia
2.	1997	Beirut, Lebanon
3.	1998	Doha, Qatar
4.	1998	Wakayama, Japan
5.	1999	Linz, Austria
6.	2003	Croatia, Croatia
7.	2003	Bremen, Germany
8.	2004	Pyeongchang, South Korea
9.	2004	Changchun, China
10.	2006	Doha, Qatar
11.	2006	Kuwait City, Kuwait
12.	2006	Kunshan, China
13.	2006	Singapore
14.	2007	Doha, Qatar
15.	2007	Toulouse, France
16.	2007	Kuwait City, Kuwait
