= 2001 World Table Tennis Championships – Women's doubles =

2001 Women's doubles

The 2001 World Table Tennis Championships women's doubles was the 45th edition of the women's doubles championship. Li Ju and Wang Nan defeated Yang Ying and Sun Jin in the final by three sets to nil.

== Results ==
Round of 16
(China) Wang Nan (China) Li Ju	22	13	21
(Germany) Nicole Struse (Germany) Elke Schall	20	21	10
(Austria) Liu Jia (Austria) Judit Herczig	21	21
(Russia) Galina Melnik (Russia) Julia Kugaj	14	16
(China) Zhang Yining (China) Zhang Yingying	21	21
(Japan) Miyuki Nishii (Japan) Yuka Nishii	15	11
(South Korea) Ryu Ji-hae (South Korea) Kim Moo-kyo	21	20	18
(North Korea) Kim Hyon-hui (North Korea) Kim Hyang-mi	12	22	21
(Hungary) Krisztina Tóth (Hungary) Csilla Bátorfi	26	12	18
(Japan) Akiko Takeda (Japan) Mayu Kawagoe	24	21	21
(Croatia) Tamara Boroš (Croatia) Eldijana Aganovic	14	21	21
(Romania) Mihaela Steff (Romania) Otilia Bădescu	21	15	15
(South Korea) Lee Eun-sil (South Korea) Suk Eun-mi	13	21	21
(Japan) Keiko Okazaki (Japan) Aya Umemura	21	18	11
(Sweden) Marie Svensson (Sweden) Åsa Svensson	11	17
(China) Yang Ying (China) Sun Jin	21	21

Quarterfinals
(China) Wang Nan (China) Li Ju	21	21	21
(Austria) Liu Jia (Austria) Herczig	14	14	17
(China) Zhang Yining (China) Zhang Yinying	17	16	21	21	21
(North Korea) Kim Hyon-hui (North Korea) Kim Hyang-mi	21	21	12	15	15
(Japan) Takeda (Japan) Kawagoe	24	21	16	23
(Croatia) Boros (Croatia) Aganovic	22	19	21	21
(South Korea) Lee Eun-sil (South Korea) Suk Eun	21	21	21
(China) Yang Ying (China) Sun Jin	18	17	12

Semifinals
(China) Wang Nan (China) Li Ju	21	21	21
(China) Zhang Yining (China) Zhang Yingying	17	17	15
(Japan) Takeda (Japan) Kawagoe	15	12	12
(China) Yang Ying (China) Sun Jin	21	21	21

Final
(China) Wang Nan (China) Li Ju	21	21	21
(China) Yang Ying (China) Sun Jin	16	14	14

== See also ==
List of World Table Tennis Championships medalists
