= 2001 World Table Tennis Championships =

2001 edition of the World Table Tennis Championships

- Venue: Osaka Municipal Central Gymnasium; Maruzen Intec Osaka Pool; Minato Sports Center
- Location: Osaka, Japan
- Dates: 23 April–6 May

The 2001 World Table Tennis Championships were held in Osaka from April 23 to May 6, 2001. It was the last time that the Championships hosted both the individual and team events.

== Results ==
=== Team ===
Event	Gold	Silver	Bronze
Swaythling Cup; Men's Team	China; Kong Linghui; Liu Guoliang; Liu Guozheng; Ma Lin; Wang Liqin	Belgium; Martin Bratanov; Marc Closset; Andras Podpinka; Jean-Michel Saive; Philippe Saive	South Korea; Joo Se-Hyuk; Kim Taek-Soo; Lee Chul-Seung; Oh Sang-Eun; Ryu Seung-Min
Swaythling Cup; Men's Team	China; Kong Linghui; Liu Guoliang; Liu Guozheng; Ma Lin; Wang Liqin	Belgium; Martin Bratanov; Marc Closset; Andras Podpinka; Jean-Michel Saive; Philippe Saive	Sweden; Fredrik Håkansson; Peter Karlsson; Magnus Molin; Jörgen Persson; Jan-Ove Waldner
Corbillon Cup; Women's Team	China; Li Ju; Sun Jin; Wang Nan; Yang Ying; Zhang Yining	North Korea; Kim Hyang-Mi; Kim Hyon-hui; Kim Mi-Yong; Kim Yun-Mi; Tu Jong-sil	Japan; Junko Haneyoshi; An Konishi; Yuka Nishii; Keiko Okazaki; Yoshie Takada
Corbillon Cup; Women's Team	China; Li Ju; Sun Jin; Wang Nan; Yang Ying; Zhang Yining	North Korea; Kim Hyang-Mi; Kim Hyon-hui; Kim Mi-Yong; Kim Yun-Mi; Tu Jong-sil	South Korea; Jun Hye-Kyung; Kim Moo-Kyo; Lee Eun-Sil; Ryu Ji-Hae; Seok Eun-mi

=== Individual ===
Event	Gold	Silver	Bronze
Men's singles	(China) Wang Liqin	(China) Kong Linghui	(Chinese Taipei) Chiang Peng-lung
Men's singles	(China) Wang Liqin	(China) Kong Linghui	(China) Ma Lin
Women's singles	(China) Wang Nan	(China) Lin Ling	(China) Zhang Yining
Women's singles	(China) Wang Nan	(China) Lin Ling	(North Korea) Kim Yun-Mi
Men's doubles	(China) Wang Liqin (China) Yan Sen	(China) Kong Linghui (China) Liu Guoliang	(Chinese Taipei) Chang Yen-shu (Chinese Taipei) Chiang Peng-lung
Men's doubles	(China) Wang Liqin (China) Yan Sen	(China) Kong Linghui (China) Liu Guoliang	(South Korea) Kim Taek-Soo (South Korea) Oh Sang-Eun
Women's doubles	(China) Li Ju (China) Wang Nan	(China) Sun Jin (China) Yang Ying	(China) Zhang Yingying (China) Zhang Yining
Women's doubles	(China) Li Ju (China) Wang Nan	(China) Sun Jin (China) Yang Ying	(Japan) Mayu Kishi-Kawagoe (Japan) Akiko Takeda
Mixed doubles	(China) Qin Zhijian (China) Yang Ying	(South Korea) Oh Sang-Eun (South Korea) Kim Moo-Kyo	(China) Liu Guoliang (China) Sun Jin
Mixed doubles	(China) Qin Zhijian (China) Yang Ying	(South Korea) Oh Sang-Eun (South Korea) Kim Moo-Kyo	(China) Zhan Jian (China) Bai Yang
