= 2005 World Table Tennis Championships – Women's doubles =

Women's doubles at the 2005 World Table Tennis Championships
- Venue: Shanghai Grand Stage
- Location: Shanghai, China
- Final score: 11–4, 11–5, 10–12, 11–9, 11–5

Medalists
gold medal	Wang Nan; Zhang Yining	China
silver medal	Guo Yue; Niu Jianfeng	China
bronze medal	Tie Ya Na; Zhang Rui	Hong Kong
bronze medal	Bai Yang; Guo Yan	China

The 2005 World Table Tennis Championships women's doubles was the 47th edition of the women's doubles championship. Zhang Yining and Wang Nan defeated Niu Jianfeng and Guo Yue in the final by four sets to one.

== Seeds ==
1. (China) Wang Nan / (China) Zhang Yining (champions)
2. (China) Guo Yue / (China) Niu Jianfeng (final)
3. (China) Bai Yang / (China) Guo Yan (semifinals)
4. (Hong Kong) Tie Ya Na / (Hong Kong) Zhang Rui (semifinals)
5. (Hong Kong) Lau Sui Fei / (Hong Kong) Song Ah Sim (quarterfinals)
6. (Hungary) Csilla Bátorfi / (Hungary) Krisztina Tóth (quarterfinals)
7. (Singapore) Li Jiawei / (Singapore) Xu Yan (third round)
8. (South Korea) Kim Kyung-ah / (South Korea) Kim Soong-sil (third round)
9. (Croatia) Tamara Boroš / (Croatia) Cornelia Vaida (quarterfinals)
10. (North Korea) Kim Hyang-mi / (North Korea) Kim Mi-yong (third round)
11. (Russia) Svetlana Ganina / (Russia) Irina Palina (second round)
12. (Japan) Saki Kanazawa / (Japan) Aya Umemura (third round)
13. (Belarus) Tatyana Kostromina / (Belarus) Viktoria Pavlovich (second round)
14. (Chinese Taipei) Huang Yi-hua / (Chinese Taipei) Lu Yun-feng (third round)
15. (Japan) Ai Fujinuma / (Japan) Ai Fukuhara (quarterfinals)
16. (Italy) Nikoleta Stefanova / (Italy) Wenling Tan Monfardini (third round)

== Finals ==
Third round
1	(China) Wang Nan (China) Zhang Yining	11	11	11	11
(South Korea) Lee Hyang-mi (South Korea) Moon Hyun-jung	6	3	6	7
15	(Japan) Ai Fujinuma (Japan) Ai Fukuhara	7	13	9	6	11	11	11
7	(Singapore) Li Jiawei (Singapore) Yan Xu	11	11	11	11	3	3	7
5	(Hong Kong) Lau Sui Fei (Hong Kong) Song Ah Sim	11	7	11	10	10	11	11
(Germany) Kristin Silbereisen (Germany) Nicole Struse	7	11	4	12	12	8	9
14	(Chinese Taipei) Huang Yi-hua (Chinese Taipei) Lu Yun-feng	5	11	7	6	12	15
4	(Hong Kong) Tie Ya Na (Hong Kong) Zhang Rui	11	9	11	11	10	17
3	(China) Bai Yang (China) Guo Yan	11	11	15	11
12	(Japan) Saki Kanazawa (Japan) Aya Umemura	1	9	13	8
6	(Hungary) Krisztina Tóth (Hungary) Csilla Bátorfi	11	11	8	11	5	14
16	(Italy) Nikoleta Stefanova (Italy) Wenling Tan Monfardini	9	5	11	6	11	12
9	(Croatia) Tamara Boroš (Croatia) Cornelia Vaida	11	13	11	8	13
8	(South Korea) Kim Kyung-ah (South Korea) Kim Soong-sil	9	11	7	11	11
10	(North Korea) Kim Hyang-mi (North Korea) Kim Mi-yong	11	7	5	11	7	7
2	(China) Guo Yue (China) Niu Jianfeng	7	11	11	4	11	11

Quarterfinals
1	(China) Wang Nan (China) Zhang Yining	11	11	11	11
15	(Japan) Ai Fujinuma (Japan) Ai Fukuhara	3	9	9	3
5	(Hong Kong) Lau Sui Fei (Hong Kong) Song Ah Sim	8	5	9	13	3
4	(Hong Kong) Tie Ya Na (Hong Kong) Zhang Rui	11	11	11	11	11
3	(China) Bai Yang (China) Guo Yan	11	11	11	11
6	(Hungary) Krisztina Tóth (Hungary) Csilla Bátorfi	7	7	8	6
9	(Croatia) Tamara Boroš (Croatia) Cornelia Vaida	6	2	12	7	2
2	(China) Guo Yue (China) Niu Jianfeng	11	11	10	11	11

Semifinals
1	(China) Wang Nan (China) Zhang Yining	11	11	9	11	11	11
4	(Hong Kong) Tie Ya Na (Hong Kong) Zhang Rui	9	4	11	8	13	6
3	(China) Bai Yang (China) Guo Yan	4	10	6	9
2	(China) Guo Yue (China) Niu Jianfeng	11	12	11	11

Final
1	(China) Wang Nan (China) Zhang Yining	11	11	10	11	11
2	(China) Guo Yue (China) Niu Jianfeng	4	5	12	9	5
