= 1999 World Table Tennis Championships – Women's doubles =

1999 Women's doubles

The 1999 World Table Tennis Championships women's doubles was the 44th edition of the women's doubles championship. Li Ju and Wang Nan defeated Yang Ying and Sun Jin in the final by three sets to nil.

== Results ==
Round of 16
(China) Wang Nan (China) Li Ju	21	21
(Japan) An Konishi (Japan) Ai Fujinuma	10	12
(China) Lin Ling (China) Li Nan	18	20
(Hungary) Krisztina Tóth (Hungary) Csilla Bátorfi	21	22
(Luxembourg) Ni Xialian (Luxembourg) Peggy Regenwetter	14	21	21
(Italy) Alessia Arisi (Italy) Laura Negrisoli	21	16	19
(South Korea) Ryu Ji-hae (South Korea) Lee Eun-sil	14	22
(China) Zhang Yining (China) Zhang Yingying	21	24
(China) Yang Ying (China) Sun Jin	21	21
(Belarus) Viktoria Pavlovich (Belarus) Tatsiana Kostromina	10	12
(Canada) Geng Lijuan (South Korea) Suk Eun Mi	21	21
(Germany) Qianhong Gotsch (Germany) Jie Schöpp	15	16
(South Korea) Park Hae-jung (South Korea) Kim Moo-kyo	21	17	21
(Japan) Kazuko Naito (Japan) Rinko Sakata	17	21	16
(Chinese Taipei) Chen Jing (Chinese Taipei) Xu Jing	21	21
(China) Wang Hui (China) Cheng Hongxia	15	12

Quarterfinals
(China) Wang Nan (China) Li Ju	21	21	21
(Hungary) Bátorfi (Hungary) Tóth	9	18	16
(Luxembourg) Ni Xialian (Luxembourg) Regenwetter	21	7	7	8
(China) Zhang Yining (China) Zhang Yinying	15	21	21	21
(China) Yang Ying (China) Sun Jin	21	20	21	21
(Canada) Geng Lijuan (South Korea) Suk Eun Mi	15	22	12	15
(South Korea) Park Hae-jung (South Korea) Kim Moo-kyo	19	12	21	23	21
(Chinese Taipei) Cheng Jing (Chinese Taipei) Xu Jing	21	21	18	21	18

Semifinals
(China) Wang Nan (China) Li Ju	23	21	21
(China) Zhang Yining (China) Zhang Yingying	21	17	16
(China) Yang Ying (China) Sun Jin	21	21	15	21
(South Korea) Park Hae-jung (South Korea) Kim Moo-kyo	14	9	21	18

Final
(China) Wang Nan (China) Li Ju	22	21	21
(China) Yang Ying (China) Sun Jin	20	14	19

== See also ==
List of World Table Tennis Championships medalists
