= 2001 World Table Tennis Championships – Women's team =

2001 women's team (Corbillon Cup)

The 2001 World Table Tennis Championships – women's team (Corbillon Cup) was the 39th edition of the women's team championship.

China won the gold medal defeating North Korea in the final 3–0. Japan and South Korea won bronze medals.

== Medalists ==
Event	Gold	Silver	Bronze
	China; Li Ju; Sun Jin; Wang Nan; Yang Ying; Zhang Yining	North Korea; Kim Hyang-Mi; Kim Hyon-hui; Kim Mi-Yong; Kim Yun-Mi; Tu Jong-sil	Japan; Junko Haneyoshi; An Konishi; Yuka Nishii; Keiko Okazaki; Yoshie Takada
	China; Li Ju; Sun Jin; Wang Nan; Yang Ying; Zhang Yining	North Korea; Kim Hyang-Mi; Kim Hyon-hui; Kim Mi-Yong; Kim Yun-Mi; Tu Jong-sil	South Korea; Jun Hye-Kyung; Kim Moo-Kyo; Lee Eun-Sil; Ryu Ji-Hae; Seok Eun-mi

== Final stage knockout phase ==
=== Round of 16 ===
Team One	Team Two	Score
China	Germany	3–0
South Korea	Austria	3–1
North Korea	Belarus	3–1
Japan	Czech Republic	3–1
Hungary	Yugoslavia	3-0
Chinese Taipei	Hong Kong	3-2
Singapore	Canada	3–0
Romania	Croatia	3–0

=== Quarter finals ===
Team One	Team Two	Score
China	Hungary	3–0
South Korea	Chinese Taipei	3–0
North Korea	Singapore	3–1
Japan	Romania	3–2

=== Semifinals ===
Team One	Team Two	Score
North Korea	South Korea	3–1
China	Japan	3–0

=== Final ===
China 3		North Korea 0	Score
Wang Nan	bt	Kim Hyang-Mi	21–15 21–10
Zhang Yining	bt	Kim Hyon-hui	18–21 21–18 21–13
Li Ju	bt	Tu Jong-Sil	17–21 23–21 21–14

== See also ==
List of World Table Tennis Championships medalists
