= Table tennis at the 2002 Asian Games =

Table Tennis tournament in Busan, South Korea

- Venue: Dongchun Gymnasium
- Dates: 1–9 October 2002
- Competitors: 105 from 18 nations

Table tennis was contested from 1 October 2002 to 9 October 2002 at the 2002 Asian Games in Dongchun Gymnasium, Ulsan, South Korea.

Table tennis had team, doubles and singles events for men and women, as well as a mixed doubles competition.

== Schedule ==
P	Preliminary rounds	¼	Quarterfinals	½	Semifinals	F	Final

Event↓/Date →	1st Tue	2nd Wed	3rd Thu		4th Fri		5th Sat	6th Sun			7th Mon			8th Tue		9th Wed	
Men's singles														P	¼	½	F
Men's doubles											P	¼	½	F			
Men's team	P	P	P	¼	½		F										
Women's singles														P	¼	½	F
Women's doubles											P	¼	½	F			
Women's team	P	P	P	¼	½	F											
Mixed doubles							P	¼	½	F							

== Medalists ==
Event	Gold	Silver	Bronze
Men's singles	Wang Liqin; China	Chuang Chih-yuan; Chinese Taipei	Oh Sang-eun; South Korea
Men's singles	Wang Liqin; China	Chuang Chih-yuan; Chinese Taipei	Kong Linghui; China
Men's doubles	South Korea; Lee Chul-seung; Ryu Seung-min	South Korea; Kim Taek-soo; Oh Sang-eun	China; Ma Lin; Kong Linghui
Men's doubles	South Korea; Lee Chul-seung; Ryu Seung-min	South Korea; Kim Taek-soo; Oh Sang-eun	China; Wang Liqin; Yan Sen
Men's team	China; Kong Linghui; Liu Guozheng; Ma Lin; Wang Liqin; Yan Sen	South Korea; Joo Sae-hyuk; Kim Taek-soo; Lee Chul-seung; Oh Sang-eun; Ryu Seung-min	Hong Kong; Cheung Yuk; Ko Lai Chak; Leung Chu Yan; Li Ching; Tang Kwok Kei
Men's team	China; Kong Linghui; Liu Guozheng; Ma Lin; Wang Liqin; Yan Sen	South Korea; Joo Sae-hyuk; Kim Taek-soo; Lee Chul-seung; Oh Sang-eun; Ryu Seung-min	Chinese Taipei; Chang Yen-shu; Chen Cheng-kao; Chiang Peng-lung; Chuang Chih-yuan; Wu Chih-chi
Women's singles	Zhang Yining; China	Wang Nan; China	Li Jiawei; Singapore
Women's singles	Zhang Yining; China	Wang Nan; China	Ryu Ji-hye; South Korea
Women's doubles	South Korea; Lee Eun-sil; Seok Eun-mi	China; Zhang Yining; Li Nan	South Korea; Ryu Ji-hye; Kim Moo-kyo
Women's doubles	South Korea; Lee Eun-sil; Seok Eun-mi	China; Zhang Yining; Li Nan	China; Wang Nan; Guo Yan
Women's team	North Korea; Kim Hyang-mi; Kim Hyon-hui; Kim Mi-yong; Kim Yun-mi; Ryom Won-ok	China; Guo Yan; Li Nan; Niu Jianfeng; Wang Nan; Zhang Yining	Singapore; Jing Junhong; Li Jiawei; Tan Paey Fern; Zhang Xueling
Women's team	North Korea; Kim Hyang-mi; Kim Hyon-hui; Kim Mi-yong; Kim Yun-mi; Ryom Won-ok	China; Guo Yan; Li Nan; Niu Jianfeng; Wang Nan; Zhang Yining	Japan; Ai Fukuhara; Satoko Kishida; An Konishi; Mikie Takahashi; Aya Umemura
Mixed doubles	Hong Kong; Cheung Yuk; Tie Ya Na	South Korea; Ryu Seung-min; Ryu Ji-hye	China; Wang Liqin; Wang Nan
Mixed doubles	Hong Kong; Cheung Yuk; Tie Ya Na	South Korea; Ryu Seung-min; Ryu Ji-hye	China; Ma Lin; Li Nan

== Medal table ==
Rank	Nation	Gold	Silver	Bronze	Total
1	China (CHN)	3	3	6	12
2	South Korea (KOR)	2	3	3	8
3	Hong Kong (HKG)	1	0	1	2
4	North Korea (PRK)	1	0	0	1
5	Chinese Taipei (TPE)	0	1	1	2
6	Singapore (SIN)	0	0	2	2
7	Japan (JPN)	0	0	1	1
Totals (7 entries)		7	7	14	28

== Participating nations ==
A total of 105 athletes from 18 nations competed in table tennis at the 2002 Asian Games:

- China (10)
- Chinese Taipei (10)
- Hong Kong (10)
- India (2)
- Japan (10)
- Jordan (2)
- Kuwait (4)
- Mongolia (9)
- North Korea (10)
- Pakistan (4)
- Philippines (1)
- Qatar (5)
- Singapore (6)
- South Korea (10)
- Tajikistan (3)
- Timor-Leste (1)
- Uzbekistan (4)
- Vietnam (4)
