= 2005 World Table Tennis Championships – Mixed doubles =

Mixed doubles at the 2005 World Table Tennis Championships
- Venue: Shanghai Grand Stage
- Location: Shanghai, China
- Final score: 11–4, 6–11, 8–11, 11–7, 11–9, 7–11, 11–6

Medalists
gold medal	Wang Liqin; Guo Yue	China
silver medal	Liu Guozheng; Bai Yang	China
bronze medal	Qiu Yike; Cao Zhen	China
bronze medal	Yan Sen; Guo Yan	China

The 2005 World Table Tennis Championships mixed doubles was the 48th edition of the mixed doubles championship.

Wang Liqin and Guo Yue defeated Liu Guozheng and Bai Yang in the final by four sets to three.

== Seeds ==
1. (China) Wang Hao / (China) Wang Nan (quarterfinals)
2. (China) Wang Liqin / (China) Guo Yue (champions)
3. (China) Chen Qi / (China) Zhang Yining (fourth round)
4. (China) Liu Guozheng / (China) Bai Yang (semifinals)
5. (China) Hao Shuai / (China) Niu Jianfeng (quarterfinals)
6. (South Korea) Ryu Seung-min / (South Korea) Kim Hye-hyun (third round)
7. (Hong Kong) Cheung Yuk / (Hong Kong) Tie Ya Na (third round)
8. (Austria) Werner Schlager / (Austria) Liu Jia (quarterfinals)
9. (Hong Kong) Ko Lai Chak / (Hong Kong) Zhang Rui (fourth round)
10. (China) Qiu Yike / (China) Cao Zhen (semifinals)
11. (Hong Kong) Leung Chu Yan / (Hong Kong) Song Ah Sim (fourth round)
12. (China) Yan Sen / (China) Guo Yan (semifinals)
13. (South Korea) Oh Sang-eun / (South Korea) Lee Hyang-mi (fourth round)
14. (Romania) Adrian Crișan / (Romania) Otilia Bădescu (third round)
15. (Hong Kong) Li Ching / (Hong Kong) Lau Sui Fei (fourth round)
16. (Chinese Taipei) Chuang Chih-yuan / (Chinese Taipei) Huang Yi-hua (third round)
17. (Russia) Alexei Smirnov / (Russia) Svetlana Ganina (second round)
18. (Netherlands) Danny Heister / (Netherlands) Li Jiao (third round)
19. (Germany) Zoltan Fejer-Konnerth / (Germany) Nicole Struse (fourth round)
20. (Italy) Yang Min / (Italy) Nicoletta Stefanova (fourth round)
21. (Germany) Christian Süß / (Germany) Kristin Silbereisen (second round)
22. (Germany) Bastian Steger / (Germany) Elke Wosik (second round)
23. (Hungary) Peter Fazekas / (Hungary) Krisztina Tóth (third round)
24. (Russia) Fedor Kuzmin / (Russia) Irina Palina (first round)
25. (Dominican Republic) Lin Ju / (Dominican Republic) Wu Xue (third round)
26. (Hungary) Ferenc Pazsy / (Hungary) Georgina Póta (first round)
27. (United States) Ilija Lupulesku / (United States) Gao Jun (third round)
28. (North Korea) Pak Won-chol / (North Korea) Kim Hyang-mi (third round)
29. (Singapore) Cai Xiaoli / (Singapore) Li Jiawei (third round)
30. (Japan) Seiya Kishikawa / (Japan) Ai Fujinuma (quarterfinals)
31. (Japan) Ryusuke Sakamoto / (Japan) Ai Fukuhara (third round)
32. (South Korea) Lee Jung-woo / (South Korea) Moon Hyun-jung (third round)

== Finals ==
Fourth round
1	(China) Wang Hao (China) Wang Nan	7	11	4	11	11	9	11
15	(Hong Kong) Li Ching (Hong Kong) Lau Sui Fei	11	9	11	9	5	11	8
10	(China) Qiu Yike (China) Cao Zhen	11	11	11	11
19	(Germany) Zoltan Fejer-Konnerth (Germany) Nicole Struse	5	2	3	8
5	(China) Hao Shuai (China) Niu Jianfeng	10	11	11	11	12
20	(Italy) Yang Min (Italy) Nikoleta Stefanova	12	8	5	7	10
4	(China) Liu Guozheng (China) Bai Yang	11	11	11	11
11	(Hong Kong) Leung Chu Yan (Hong Kong) Song Ah Sim	4	4	7	8
12	(China) Yan Sen (China) Guo Yan	6	11	7	11	11	11
3	(China) Chen Qi (China) Zhang Yining	11	9	11	6	8	8
30	(Japan) Seiya Kishikawa (Japan) Ai Fujinuma	11	11	11	11
(North Korea) Kim Song-chol (North Korea) Kim Jong	8	3	9	6
8	(Austria) Werner Schlager (Austria) Liu Jia	8	6	11	11	18	12	13
13	(South Korea) Oh Sang-eun (South Korea) Lee Hyang-mi	11	11	7	13	16	10	11
2	(China) Wang Liqin (China) Guo Yue	11	11	11	10	8	11
9	(Hong Kong) Ko Lai Chak (Hong Kong) Zhang Rui	7	5	7	12	11	6

Quarterfinals
1	(China) Wang Hao (China) Wang Nan	5	11	9	11	8	11	6
10	(China) Qiu Yike (China) Cao Zhen	11	2	11	8	11	7	11
5	(China) Hao Shuai (China) Niu Jianfeng	8	8	8	9
4	(China) Liu Guozheng (China) Bai Yang	11	11	11	11
12	(China) Yan Sen (China) Guo Yan	11	11	11	16	11
30	(Japan) Seiya Kishikawa (Japan) Ai Fujinuma	4	5	13	14	7
8	(Austria) Werner Schlager (Austria) Liu Jia	7	4	3	6
2	(China) Wang Liqin (China) Guo Yue	11	11	11	11

Semifinals
10	(China) Qiu Yike (China) Cao Zhen	7	5	11	10	4
4	(China) Liu Guozheng (China) Bai Yang	11	11	5	12	11
12	(China) Yan Sen (China) Guo Yan	8	12	5	5	9
2	(China) Wang Liqin (China) Guo Yue	11	10	11	11	11

Final
4	(China) Liu Guozheng (China) Bai Yang	4	11	11	7	9	11	6
2	(China) Wang Liqin (China) Guo Yue	11	6	8	11	11	7	11
