= 2000 World Team Table Tennis Championships – Women's team =

2000 women's team (Corbillon Cup)

The 2000 World Table Tennis Championships – women's team (Corbillon Cup) was the 38th edition of the women's team championship.

China won the gold medal defeating Chinese Taipei in the final 3–1. Romania and South Korea won bronze medals.

== Medalists ==
Event	Gold	Silver	Bronze
	China; Li Ju; Sun Jin; Wang Hui; Wang Nan; Zhang Yining	Chinese Taipei; Chen Jing; Lu Yun-feng; Pan Li-chun; Tsui Hsiu-li; Xu Jing	South Korea; Kim Moo-Kyo; Lee Eun-Sil; Park Hae-Jung; Ryu Ji-Hae; Seok Eun-Mi
	China; Li Ju; Sun Jin; Wang Hui; Wang Nan; Zhang Yining	Chinese Taipei; Chen Jing; Lu Yun-feng; Pan Li-chun; Tsui Hsiu-li; Xu Jing	Romania; Otilia Badescu; Ana Gogorita; Antonela Manac; Mihaela Steff

== Final stage knockout phase ==
=== Quarter finals ===
Team One	Team Two	Score
China	Hong Kong	3–0
South Korea	Japan	3–1
Chinese Taipei	Germany	3–1
Romania	Singapore	3–1

=== Semifinals ===
Team One	Team Two	Score
Chinese Taipei	Romania	3–2
China	South Korea	3–1

=== Final ===
China 3		Chinese Taipei 1	Score
Li Ju	bt	Tsui Hsiu-li	21–10 21–11
Wang Nan	bt	Chen Jing	21–7 21–11
Zhang Yining	lost to	Xu Jing	19–21 18–21
Wang Nan	bt	Tsui Hsiu-li	21–8 21–19

== See also ==
List of World Table Tennis Championships medalists
