= 2003 World Table Tennis Championships – Women's doubles =

The 2003 World Table Tennis Championships women's doubles was the 46th edition of the women's doubles championship. Zhang Yining and Wang Nan defeated Niu Jianfeng and Guo Yue in the final by four sets to one.

== Finals ==
Third round
(China) Wang Nan (China) Zhang Yining	9	11	11	9	11	11
(Romania) Adriana Zamfir (Romania) Mihaela Steff	11	8	4	11	6	6
(Japan) Aya Umemura (Japan) Mikie Tasei	5	11	11	11	11
(Belarus) Tatyana Logatzkaya (Belarus) Veronika Pavlovich	11	9	5	6	9
(Singapore) Li Jiawei (Singapore) Jin Jung Hong	11	7	11	12	6	12
(Chinese Taipei) Huang Yi-hua (Chinese Taipei) Lu Yun-Feng	6	11	4	10	11	10
(South Korea) Suk Yun-mi (South Korea) Lee Eun-sil	12	11	11	11
(Hong Kong) Tie Ya Na (Hong Kong) Song Ah Sim	10	7	8	8
(China) Li Jia (China) Li Ju	13	9	11	11	15	10	11
(Hong Kong) Lau Sui Fei (Hong Kong) Kwok Fong Fong	15	11	3	9	13	12	4
(Hungary) Krisztina Tóth (Hungary) Csilla Bátorfi	11	19	11	11	11
(Belarus) Victoria Pavlovich (Belarus) Tatyana Kostromina	6	21	2	5	8
(Russia) Irina Palina (Russia) Svetlana Ganina	11	11	16	11
(Japan) An Konishi (Japan) Ai Fukuhara	9	6	14	3
(South Korea) Kim Jyung-ha (South Korea) Jeon Hye-kyung	10	5	9	13	9
(China) Guo Yue (China) Niu Jianfeng	12	11	11	11	11

Quarterfinals
(China) Wang Nan (China) Zhang Yining	11	11	11	11
(Japan) Umemura (Japan) Tasei	5	7	7	7
(Singapore) Li Jiawei (Singapore) Jin Jung Hong	12	9	8	9	11	12
(South Korea) Suk Yun-mi (South Korea) Lee Eun-sil	10	11	11	11	4	14
(China) Li Jia (China) Li Ju	12	11	11	11	11
(Hungary) Tóth (Hungary) Bátorfi	14	4	8	6	6
(Russia) Palina (Russia) Ganina	9	11	6	0	11	4
(China) Guo Yue (China) Niu Jianfeng	11	4	11	11	8	11

Semifinals
(China) Wang Nan (China) Zhang Yining	11	11	11	11
(South Korea) Suk Yun-mi (South Korea) Lee Eun-sil	6	5	8	5
(China) Li Jia (China) Li Ju	8	5	11	14	14
(China) Guo Yue (China) Niu Jianfeng	11	11	8	16	16

Final
(China) Wang Nan (China) Zhang Yining	11	11	7	11	14
(China) Guo Yue (China) Niu Jianfeng	7	7	11	2	12
