= 1997 World Table Tennis Championships – Women's doubles =

1997 Women's doubles

The 1997 World Table Tennis Championships women's doubles was the 43rd edition of the women's doubles championship. Deng Yaping and Yang Ying defeated Li Ju and Wang Nan in the final by three sets to two.

== Results ==
Round of 16
(China) Deng Yaping (China) Yang Ying	21	21
(Japan) Rika Sato (Japan) Rika Matsuoka	7	19
(Chinese Taipei) Chen Jing (Chinese Taipei) Chen Chiu-Tan	21	21
(Hungary) Krisztina Tóth (Hungary) Csilla Bátorfi	15	12
(China) Wang Chen (China) Wu Na	24	21
(South Korea) Kim Moo-kyo (South Korea) Kim Boon Sik	22	17
(Sweden) Marie Svensson (Sweden) Pernilla Petersson	13	7
(China) Qiao Yunping (Hong Kong) Chai Po Wa	21	21
(China) Li Ju (China) Wang Nan	21	18	21
(Chinese Taipei) Tong Fei-Ming (Chinese Taipei) Xu Jing	12	21	12
(Japan) Ai Sakata (Japan) Yuki Takakusa	21	21
(Russia) Irina Palina (Russia) Elena Timina	15	16
(China) Wang Hui (China) Cheng Hongxia	21	21
(China) Zhu Fang (Hong Kong) Chan Tan Lui	15	15
(Romania) Otilia Bădescu (Romania) Emilia Elena Ciosu	21	21
(South Korea) Park Hae-jung (South Korea) Ryu Ji-hae	18	17

Quarterfinals
(China) Deng Yaping (China) Yang Ying	21	21	21
(Chinese Taipei) Chen Jing (Chinese Taipei) Chen Chiu-Tan	16	17	10
(China) Wang Chen (China) Wu Na	10	12	11
(China) Qiao Yunping (Hong Kong) Chai Po Wa	21	21	21
(China) Li Ju (China) Wang Nan	21	21	21
(Japan) Sakata (Japan) Takakusa	9	15	15
(China) Wang Hui (China) Cheng Hongxia	21	21	21
(Romania) Bátorfi (Romania) Ciosu	17	9	16

Semifinals
(China) Deng Yaping (China) Yang Ying	21	21	21
(China) Qiao Yunping (Hong Kong) Chai Po Wa	8	7	12
(China) Li Ju (China) Wang Nan	21	21	21
(China) Wang Hui (China) Cheng Hongxia	10	17	16

Final
(China) Deng Yaping (China) Yang Ying	21	22	17	19	21
(China) Li Ju (China) Wang Nan	17	20	21	21	11

== See also ==
List of World Table Tennis Championships medalists
