= 2003 World Table Tennis Championships =

- Date: May 19–25
- Edition: 47th
- Location: Paris, France
- Venue: Palais Omnisports de Paris-Bercy

Champions

Men's singles
- (Austria) Werner Schlager

Women's singles
- (China) Wang Nan

Men's doubles
- (China) Wang Liqin / (China) Yan Sen

Women's doubles
- (China) Wang Nan / (China) Zhang Yining

Mixed doubles
- (China) Ma Lin / (China) Wang Nan
- World Table Tennis Championships

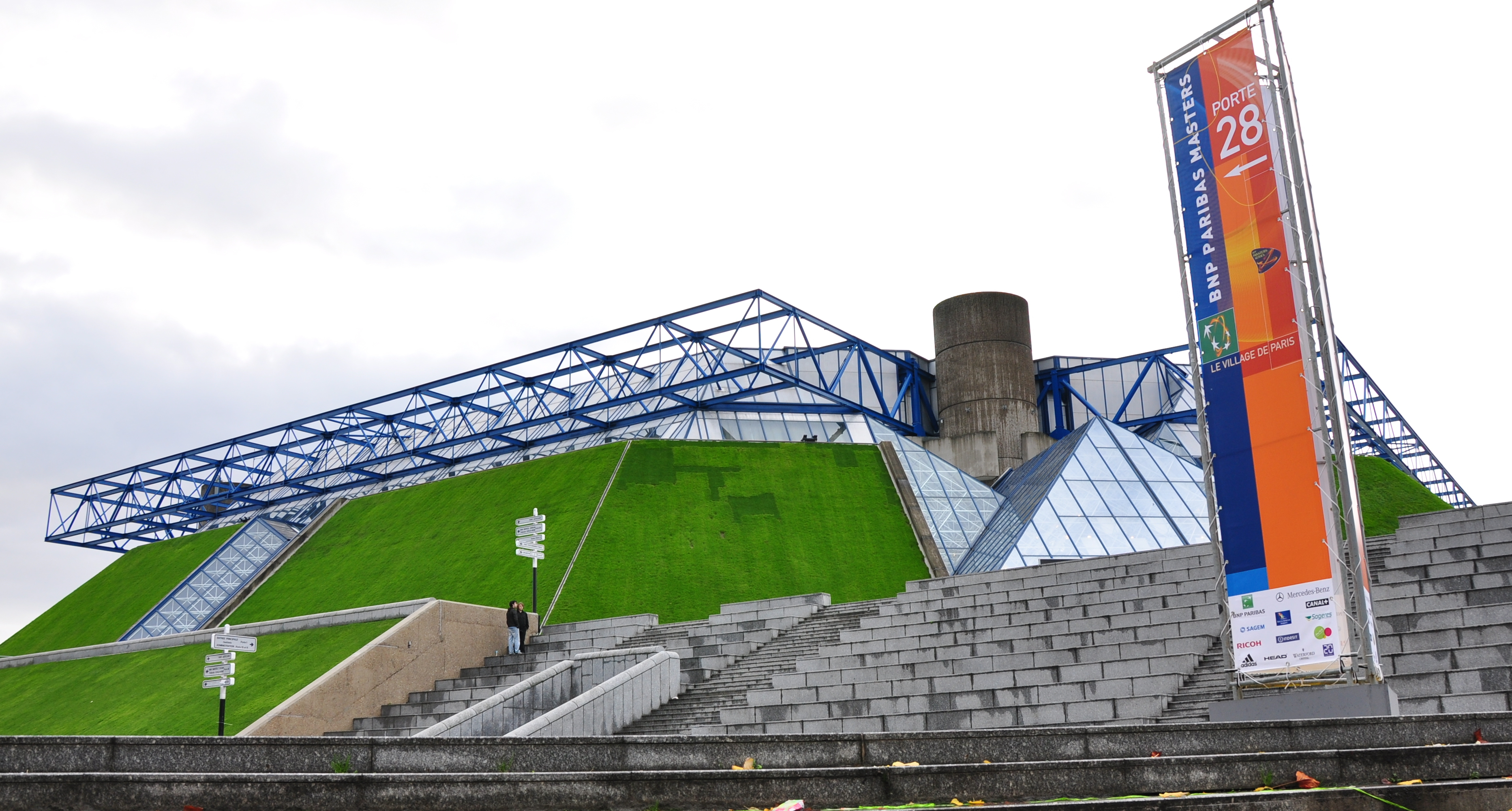
The arena where the championship was held (Bercy Arena)

The 2003 World Table Tennis Championships were held at the Palais Omnisports de Paris-Bercy in Paris from May 19 to May 25, 2003. It was the 47th edition of the table tennis contest. Liebherr was the title sponsor of the Championships.

== Medal summary ==
=== Medal table ===
Rank	Nation	Gold	Silver	Bronze	Total
1	China	4	4	6	14
2	Austria	1	0	0	1
3	South Korea	0	1	2	3
4	Croatia	0	0	1	1
4	Greece	0	0	1	1
Totals (5 entries)		5	5	10	20

=== Events ===
Event	Gold	Silver	Bronze
Men's singles	(Austria) Werner Schlager	(South Korea) Joo Sae-hyuk	(China) Kong Linghui
Men's singles	(Austria) Werner Schlager	(South Korea) Joo Sae-hyuk	(Greece) Kalinikos Kreanga
Women's singles	(China) Wang Nan	(China) Zhang Yining	(Croatia) Tamara Boroš
Women's singles	(China) Wang Nan	(China) Zhang Yining	(China) Li Ju
Men's doubles	(China) Wang Liqin; Yan Sen	(China) Wang Hao; Kong Linghui	(China) Ma Lin; Qin Zhijian
Men's doubles	(China) Wang Liqin; Yan Sen	(China) Wang Hao; Kong Linghui	(South Korea) Oh Sang-eun; Kim Taek-soo
Women's doubles	(China) Wang Nan; Zhang Yining	(China) Guo Yue; Niu Jianfeng	(South Korea) Seok Eun-mi; Lee Eun-sil
Women's doubles	(China) Wang Nan; Zhang Yining	(China) Guo Yue; Niu Jianfeng	(China) Li Jia; Li Ju
Mixed doubles	(China) Ma Lin; Wang Nan	(China) Liu Guozheng; Bai Yang	(China) Wang Hao; Li Nan
Mixed doubles	(China) Ma Lin; Wang Nan	(China) Liu Guozheng; Bai Yang	(China) Qin Zhijian; Niu Jianfeng

== Finals ==
=== Men's singles ===
(Austria) Werner Schlager def. (South Korea) Joo Se-Hyuk, 4–2: 11–9, 11–6, 6–11, 12–10, 8–11, 12–10

=== Women's singles ===
(China) Wang Nan def. (China) Zhang Yining, 4–3: 11–7, 11–8, 11–4, 5–11, 6–11, 8–11, 11–5

=== Men's doubles ===
(China) Wang Liqin / Yan Sen def. (China) Wang Hao / Kong Linghui, 4–2: 11–9, 11–8, 7–11, 11–6, 8–11, 11–5

=== Women's doubles ===
(China) Wang Nan / Zhang Yining def. (China) Guo Yue / Niu Jianfeng, 4–1: 11–7, 11–7, 7–11, 11–2, 14–12

=== Mixed doubles ===
(China) Ma Lin / Wang Nan def. (China) Liu Guozheng / Bai Yang, 4–3: 9–11, 12–10, 0–11, 11–7, 11–9, 5–11, 11–8
