= 1999 World Table Tennis Championships – Women's singles =

1999 Women's singles

The 1999 World Table Tennis Championships women's singles was the 45th edition of the women's singles championship. Wang Nan defeated Zhang Yining in the final by three sets to two, to win the title.

== Results ==
Round of 16
(China) Wang Nan	18	22	21	21
(Japan) He Zhili-Chire Koyama	21	20	5	18
(China) Cheng Hongxia	21	21	21
(Chinese Taipei) Chen Jing	17	19	16
(South Korea) Ryu Ji-hae	21	21	21
(China) Yang Ying	14	12	10
(Germany) Jing Tian-Zörner	15	22	21	21
(Hungary) Csilla Bátorfi	21	20	13	17
(China) Li Nan	18	21	21	21
(China) Wang Hui	21	7	18	18
(China) Sun Jin	21	21	21
(South Korea) Seok Eun-mi	13	15	14
(China) Zhang Yining	21	21	21
(Luxembourg) Ni Xialian	8	17	12
(China) Li Ju	21	21	21
(Romania) Mihaela Steff	9	10	17

Quarterfinals
(China) Wang Nan	21	21	21
(China) Cheng Hongxia	17	15	12
(South Korea) Ryu Ji-hye	18	21	21	21
(Germany) Tian-Zörner	21	17	16	9
(China) Li Nan	21	21	21	21
(China) Sun Jin	23	12	18	18
(China) Zhang Yining	21	21	21
(China) Li Ju	13	10	13

Semifinals
(China) Wang Nan	22	21	21	16	21
(South Korea) Ryu Ji-hye	24	9	15	21	16
(China) Li Nan	21	10	15	21	16
(China) Zhang Yining	18	21	21	19	21

Final
(China) Wang Nan	15	14	21	21	21
(China) Zhang Yining	21	21	5	12	11

== See also ==
List of World Table Tennis Championships medalists
