= 2001 World Table Tennis Championships – Women's singles =

2001 Women's singles

The 2001 World Table Tennis Championships women's singles was the 46th edition of the women's singles championship. Wang Nan defeated Lin Ling in the final by three sets to one, to win the title.

== Results ==
Round of 16
(China) Wang Nan	21	21	21
(North Korea) Kim Hyon-hui	15	14	9
(China) Li Nan	21	21	21
(South Korea) Ryu Ji-hae	10	8	14
(China) Niu Jianfeng	21	21	21
(Luxembourg) Ni Xialian	11	15	13
(China) Zhang Yining	21	21	21
(Singapore) Li Jiawei	14	14	18
(China) Lin Ling	21	21	21
(Chinese Taipei) Chen Jing	15	9	10
(Austria) Liu Jia	15	21	21	21
(Singapore) Jing Junhong	21	15	14	14
(Romania) Mihaela Steff	15	21	21	14	23
(South Korea) Kim Moo-kyo	21	7	18	21	21
(North Korea) Kim Yun-Mi	21	21	21
(Hungary) Krisztina Tóth	15	9	15

Quarterfinals
(China) Wang Nan	21	21	21
(China) Li Nan	13	12	15
(China) Niu Jianfeng	14	21	18	21	12
(China) Zhang Yining	21	17	21	17	21
(China) Lin Ling	21	21	23
(Austria) Liu Jia	17	18	21
(Romania) Steff	20	11	15
(North Korea) Kim Yun Mi	22	21	21

Semifinals
(China) Wang Nan	21	21	17	21
(China) Zhang Yining	19	11	21	13
(China) Lin Ling	21	14	21	21
(North Korea) Kim Yun Mi	14	21	18	11

Final
(China) Wang Nan	14	21	21	21
(China) Lin Ling	21	12	12	19

== See also ==
- List of World Table Tennis Championships medalists
