= 1997 World Table Tennis Championships – Mixed doubles =

1997 Mixed doubles

The 1997 World Table Tennis Championships mixed doubles was the 44th edition of the mixed doubles championship.

Liu Guoliang and Wu Na defeated Kong Linghui and Deng Yaping in the final by three sets to one.

== Results ==
Round of 16
(China) Kong Linghui (China) Deng Yaping	21	21
(South Korea) Oh Sang-eun (South Korea) Kim Boon-sik	18	8
(China) Lin Zhigang (China) Yang Ying	21	21
(France) Patrick Chila (Sweden) Åsa Svensson	7	13
(China) Ding Song (China) Wang Hui	21	21
(Greece) Ntaniel Tsiokas (Germany) Jie Schöpp	16	17
(Chinese Taipei) Chiang Peng-lung (Chinese Taipei) Chen Jing	21	21
(China) Kim Taek-soo (China) Park Hae-jung	18	19
(South Korea) Lee Chul-seung (South Korea) Kim Moo-kyo	21	21
(Hungary) Zsolt Harczi (Hungary) Vivien Ello	15	11
(China) Wang Liqin (China) Wang Nan	17	21	21
(China) Yan Sen (China) Li Ju	21	16	15
(South Korea) Yoo Nam-kyu (South Korea) Ryu Ji-hae	21	21
(China) Ma Lin (China) Wang Chen	15	13
(China) Liu Guoliang (China) Wu Na	22	21
(Austria) Werner Schlager (Hungary) Krisztina Tóth	20	14

Quarterfinals
(China) Kong Linghui (China) Deng Yaping	21	21	18	22
(China) Lin Zhigang (China) Yang Ying	16	19	21	20
(China) Ding Song (China) Wang Hui	21	14	19	21	17
(Chinese Taipei) Chiang Peng-lung (Chinese Taipei) Chen Jing	13	21	21	18	21
(South Korea) Lee Chul-seung (South Korea) Kim Moo-kyo	19	21	14	23
(China) Wang Liqin (China) Wang Nan	21	13	21	25
(South Korea) Yoo Nam-kyu (South Korea) Ryu Ji-hae	21	12	16	17
(China) Liu Guoliang (China) Wu Na	15	21	21	21

Semifinals
(China) Kong Linghui (China) Deng Yaping	21	21	15	21
(Chinese Taipei) Chiang Peng-lung (Chinese Taipei) Chen Jing	16	16	21	7
(China) Wang Liqin (China) Wang Nan	22	15	17	9
(China) Liu Guoliang (China) Wu Na	20	21	21	21

Final
(China) Kong Linghui (China) Deng Yaping	12	20	21	11
(China) Liu Guoliang (China) Wu Na	21	22	19	21

== See also ==
List of World Table Tennis Championships medalists
