= 2004 World Team Table Tennis Championships – Women's team =

Table Tennis championship in 2004

2004 women's team (Corbillon Cup)

The 2004 World Table Tennis Championships – women's team (Corbillon Cup) was the 40th edition of the women's team championship.

China won the gold medal defeating Hong Kong in the final 3–0. Japan won the bronze medal. The International Table Tennis Association introduced a new format for the second stage of the tournament.

== Medalists ==
Event	Gold	Silver	Bronze
	China; Zhang Yining; Guo Yue; Wang Nan; Niu Jianfeng; Li Ju	Hong Kong; Lau Sui-fei; Song Ah Sim; Zhang Rui; Tie Ya Na; Yu Kwok See	Japan; Ai Fujinuma; Ai Fukuhara; Sayaka Hirano; Naoko Taniguchi; Aya Umemura

== First stage ==
=== Group A ===
Pos	Team
1	China
2	South Korea
3	Germany
4	Russia
5	Singapore
6	Chinese Taipei

=== Group B ===
Pos	Team
1	Hong Kong
2	Japan
3	Romania
4	Hungary
5	Italy
6	Belarus

== Final stage ==
=== Final ===
6 March 2004; 16:00	Report	China	3–0	Hong Kong	Qatar International Exhibition Center, Doha
Score by game:
Wang Nan	3–2	Lau Sui-fei
Zhang Yining	3–1	Tie Ya Na
Guo Yue	3–1	Zhang Rui

=== Final 4 bracket ===
First round
A1	China	3
B1	Japan	2
A2	South Korea	2
B2	Hong Kong	3

Final eliminator
B1	Japan	0
B2	Hong Kong	3

Final
A1	China	3
B2	Hong Kong	0

== See also ==
List of World Table Tennis Championships medalists
