= 1995 World Table Tennis Championships – Mixed doubles =

1995 Mixed doubles

The 1995 World Table Tennis Championships mixed doubles was the 43rd edition of the mixed doubles championship.

Wang Tao and Liu Wei defeated Kong Linghui and Deng Yaping in the final by three sets to nil.

== Results ==
Round of 16
(China) Wang Tao (China) Liu Wei | 19 | 21 | 21
(France) Patrick Chila (Sweden) Åsa Svensson | 21 | 18 | 10
(Germany) Peter Franz (Germany) Nicole Struse | 21 | 17 | 21
(Canada) Gideon Ng Joe (Canada) Petra Cada | 14 | 21 | 19
(Sweden) Erik Lindh (Sweden) Marie Svensson | 21 | 21
(Czech Republic) Petr Korbel (Czech Republic) Jana Dobesova | 14 | 18
(Japan) Kōji Matsushita (Japan) Tomoko Ono | 21 | 22
(China) Xiong Ke (China) Wang Chen | 7 | 20
(South Korea) Lee Chul-seung (South Korea) Ryu Ji-hae | 18 | 21 | 21
(China) Lü Lin (China) Wang Nan | 21 | 15 | 17
(Greece) Kalinikos Kreanga (Romania) Otilia Bădescu | 21 | 21
(Russia) Maxim Shmyrev (Russia) Galina Melnik | 19 | 19
(China) Lin Zhigang (China) Yang Ying | 21 | 21
(Netherlands) Trinko Keen (Netherlands) Gerdie Keen | 13 | 13
(China) Kong Linghui (China) Deng Yaping | 22 | 21
(Belarus) Vladimir Samsonov (Hungary) Krisztina Tóth | 20 | 14

Quarterfinals
(China) Wang Tao (China) Liu Wei | 21 | 21 | 21
(Germany) Franz (Germany) Struse | 8 | 13 | 11
(Sweden) Lindh (Sweden) Svensson M | 21 | 21 | 19 | 21
(Japan) Matsushita (Japan) Ono | 14 | 13 | 21 | 14
(South Korea) Lee Chul-seung (South Korea) Ryu Ji-hae | 17 | 21 | 23 | 21 | 21
(Greece) Kreanga (Romania) Bădescu | 21 | 14 | 25 | 16 | 13
(China) Lin Zhigang (China) Yang Ying | 10 | 18 | 21 | 20
(China) Kong Linghui (China) Deng Yaping | 21 | 21 | 19 | 22

Semifinals
(China) Wang Tao (China) Liu Wei | 21 | 23 | 21 | 21
(Sweden) Lindh (Sweden) Svensson M | 13 | 25 | 9 | 8
(South Korea) Lee Chul-seung (South Korea) Ryu Ji-hae | 18 | 18 | 21 | 7
(China) Kong Linghui (China) Deng Yaping | 21 | 21 | 16 | 21

Final
(China) Wang Tao (China) Liu Wei | 24 | 21 | 21
(China) Kong Linghui (China) Deng Yaping | 22 | 18 | 9

== See also ==
List of World Table Tennis Championships medalists
