= 2003 World Table Tennis Championships – Women's singles =

The 2003 World Table Tennis Championships women's singles was the 47th edition of the women's singles championship. Wang Nan defeated Zhang Yining in the final by four sets to three, to win a third consecutive title.

== Finals ==
Round of 16
(China) Zhang Yining	11	11	11	11
(Chinese Taipei) Lu Yun-Feng	5	1	5	3
(Japan) Ai Fukuhara	11	11	11	8	5	11
(South Korea) Lee Eun-sil	6	8	8	11	11	6
(China) Li Ju	11	12	11	11	11
(Hong Kong) Tie Ya Na	6	14	8	3	8
(China) Niu Jianfeng	7	12	11	11	11
(Belarus) Viktoria Pavlovich	11	10	7	6	7
(Croatia) Tamara Boroš	9	7	11	11	11	10	11
(Romania) Otilia Bădescu	11	11	8	9	8	12	4
(United States) Chang Jun Gao	11	11	11	11
(South Korea) Kim Kyungah	9	8	2	5
(China) Guo Yue	13	11	11	11
(South Korea) Seok Eun-mi	11	4	4	6
(Hong Kong) Lau Sui Fei	8	10	11	5
(China) Wang Nan	11	12	13	11

Quarterfinals
(China) Zhang Yining	11	13	11	11
(Japan) Fukuhara	2	11	3	4
(China) Li Ju	13	9	12	8	10	11	11
(China) Niu Jianfeng	11	11	10	11	12	7	2
(Croatia) Boroš	9	11	9	13	11	2	11
(United States) Chang Jun Gao	11	1	11	11	7	11	6
(China) Guo Yue	11	4	8	3	11	2
(China) Wang Nan	8	11	11	11	8	11

Semifinals
(China) Zhang Yining	11	17	11	11
(China) Li Ju	8	15	4	8
(Croatia) Boroš	12	8	3	4
(China) Wang Nan	14	11	11	11

Final
(China) Zhang Yining	7	8	4	11	11	11	5
(China) Wang Nan	11	11	11	5	6	8	11
