= 2003 World Table Tennis Championships – Mixed doubles =

The 2003 World Table Tennis Championships mixed doubles was the 47th edition of the mixed doubles championship.

Ma Lin and Wang Nan defeated Liu Guozheng and Bai Yang in the final by four sets to three.

== Finals ==
Third round
(China) Ma Lin (China) Wang Nan	11	11	11	11
(Austria) Werner Schlager (Austria) Liu Jia	4	3	6	2
(South Korea) Ryu Seung-min (South Korea) Seok Eun-mi	7	4	11	12	8	11	11
(Hong Kong) Cheung Yuk (Hong Kong) Tie Ya Na	11	11	7	10	11	7	5
(China) Wang Hao (China) Li Nan	11	11	11	11
(Hungary) Ferenc Pazsy (Hungary) Zita Molnár	9	7	4	7
(China) Wang Liqin (China) Li Jia	11	11	11	11
(South Korea) Joo Sae-hyuk (South Korea) Kim Kyungah	6	9	7	5
(China) Liu Guozheng (China) Bai Yang	9	11	8	11	11	11
(Germany) Torben Wosik (Germany) Elke Schall	11	6	11	7	8	5
(China) Yan Sen (China) Zhang Yining	11	11	11	11
(Hong Kong) Leung Chu Yan (Hong Kong) Song Ah Sim	4	7	7	6
(South Korea) Oh Sang-eun (South Korea) Lee Eun-sil	11	6	11	11	11	11	11
(China) Hou Yingchao (China) Fan Ying	8	11	3	13	7	13	9
(China) Qin Zhijian (China) Niu Jianfeng	11	11	11	11
(Hong Kong) Ko Lai Chak (Hong Kong) Kwok Fong Fong	4	7	4	5

Quarterfinals
(China) Ma Lin (China) Wang Nan	12	11	11	11
(South Korea) Ryu Seung-min (South Korea) Seok Eun-mi	10	4	7	2
(China) Wang Hao (China) Li Nan	6	11	8	11	13	5	11
(China) Wang Liqin (China) Li Jia	11	7	11	9	11	11	6
(China) Liu Guozheng (China) Bai Yang	11	9	5	6	11	11	13
(China) Yan Sen (China) Zhang Yining	9	11	11	11	2	5	11
(South Korea) Oh Sang-eun (South Korea) Lee Eun-sil	11	5	12	10	11	8	7
(China) Qin Zhijian (China) Niu Jianfeng	9	11	10	12	6	11	11

Semifinals
(China) Ma Lin (China) Wang Nan	4	11	11	11	9	11
(China) Wang Hao (China) Li Nan	11	6	5	5	11	7
(China) Liu Guozheng (China) Bai Yang	2	11	11	11	9	11
(China) Qin Zhijian (China) Niu Jianfeng	11	5	9	7	11	5

Final
(China) Ma Lin (China) Wang Nan	9	12	0	11	11	5	11
(China) Liu Guozheng (China) Bai Yang	11	10	11	7	9	11	8
