= 1995 World Table Tennis Championships – Women's singles =

1995 Women's singles

The 1995 World Table Tennis Championships women's singles was the 43rd edition of the women's singles championship. Deng Yaping defeated Qiao Hong in the final by three sets to two, to win the title.

== Results ==
Round of 16
(China) Deng Yaping	21	21	21
(China) Zhu Fang	18	13	19
(Canada) Geng Lijuan	21	21	21
(China) Chen Zihe	16	8	12
(China) Liu Wei	8	21	21	21
(Germany) Jie Schöpp	21	7	9	15
(China) Wang Nan	17	21	19	21	21
(Chinese Taipei) Xu Jing	21	12	21	9	17
(Chinese Taipei) Tang Fei Ming	21	21	20	21	24
(Germany) Nicole Struse	19	16	22	23	22
(China) Qiao Yunping	21	22	21
(Hungary) Csilla Bátorfi	8	20	12
(Chinese Taipei) Chen Jing	14	21	21	21
(China) Yang Ying	21	14	18	16
(China) Qiao Hong	21	21	21
(Hong Kong) Chan Tan Lui	13	19	7

Quarterfinals
(China) Deng Yaping	21	21	21
(Canada) Geng Lijuan	12	13	10
(China) Liu Wei	21	21	21
(China) Wang Nan	6	16	15
(Chinese Taipei) Tang Fei Ming	13	21	18	9
(China) Qiao Yunping	21	19	21	21
(Chinese Taipei) Chen Jing	12	12	16
(China) Qiao Hong	21	21	21

Semifinals
(China) Deng Yaping	21	14	21	21
(China) Liu Wei	12	21	17	19
(China) Qiao Yunping	21	17	14
(China) Qiao Hong	23	21	21

Final
(China) Deng Yaping	14	21	21	14	21
(China) Qiao Hong	21	17	17	21	14

== See also ==
List of World Table Tennis Championships medalists
