= 1997 World Table Tennis Championships – Women's singles =

1997 Women's singles

The 1997 World Table Tennis Championships women's singles was the 44th edition of the women's singles championship. Deng Yaping defeated Wang Nan in the final by three sets to one, to win the title.

== Results ==
Round of 16
(China) Deng Yaping | 21 | 21 | 24
(South Korea) Ryu Ji-hae | 9 | 13 | 22
(Hong Kong) Wong Ching | 18 | 12 | 22 | 21 | 21
(China) Wang Hui | 21 | 21 | 20 | 14 | 7
(China) Qiao Yunping | 26 | 10 | 24 | 21
(Germany) Olga Nemeș | 24 | 21 | 22 | 7
(China) Li Ju | 21 | 21 | 21
(Luxembourg) Ni Xialian | 14 | 14 | 17
(China) Cheng Hongxia | 21 | 19 | 21 | 21
(South Korea) Park Hae-jung | 19 | 21 | 13 | 15
(China) Wang Nan | 21 | 21 | 21
(Canada) Geng Lijuan | 11 | 12 | 15
(Germany) Nicole Struse | 21 | 21 | 21
(China) Wang Chen | 15 | 13 | 14
(China) Wu Na | 25 | 21 | 21
(Chinese Taipei) Chen Jing | 23 | 14 | 12

Quarterfinals
(China) Deng Yaping | 21 | 21 | 19 | 21
(Hong Kong) Wong Ching | 14 | 15 | 21 | 10
(China) Qiao Yunping | 12 | 17 | 16
(China) Li Ju | 21 | 21 | 21
(China) Cheng Hongxia | 18 | 20 | 21 | 9
(China) Wang Nan | 21 | 22 | 18 | 21
(Germany) Struse | 16 | 13 | 18
(China) Wu Na | 21 | 21 | 21

Semifinals
(China) Deng Yaping | 21 | 21 | 21
(China) Li Ju | 12 | 19 | 7
(China) Wang Nan | 29 | 21 | 21 | 21
(China) Wu Na | 31 | 10 | 16 | 15

Final
(China) Deng Yaping | 12 | 21 | 21 | 21
(China) Wang Nan | 21 | 8 | 11 | 10

== See also ==
List of World Table Tennis Championships medalists
