= 2008 World Team Table Tennis Championships =

2008 edition of the World Team Table Tennis Championships

- Venue: Guangzhou Gymnasium
- Location: Guangzhou, China
- Dates: 24 February–2 March

Champions
- Men: China
- Women: China

The 2008 Evergrande Real Estate World Team Table Tennis Championships was held in the Guangzhou Gymnasium of Guangzhou, China from February 24 to March 2, 2008. This decision was announced in May 2005. It is the 49th edition to be contested.

== Medal summary ==
=== Medal table ===
Rank	Nation	Gold	Silver	Bronze	Total
1	China (CHN)	2	0	0	2
2	Singapore (SIN)	0	1	0	1
2	South Korea (KOR)	0	1	0	1
4	Hong Kong (HKG)	0	0	2	2
4	Japan (JPN)	0	0	2	2
Totals (5 entries)		2	2	4	8

=== Events ===
Event	Gold	Silver	Bronze
Men's team (Swaythling Cup)	China; Wang Hao; Ma Lin; Wang Liqin; Chen Qi; Ma Long	South Korea; Joo Se-Hyuk; Kim Jung-Hoon; Ryu Seung-Min; Lee Jung-Woo; Lee Jin-Kwon	Hong Kong; Cheung Yuk; Ko Lai Chak; Leung Chu Yan; Li Ching; Tang Peng
Men's team (Swaythling Cup)	China; Wang Hao; Ma Lin; Wang Liqin; Chen Qi; Ma Long	South Korea; Joo Se-Hyuk; Kim Jung-Hoon; Ryu Seung-Min; Lee Jung-Woo; Lee Jin-Kwon	Japan; Yo Kan; Seiya Kishikawa; Hidetoshi Oya; Jun Mizutani; Kaii Yoshida
Women's team (Corbillon Cup)	China; Guo Yan; Guo Yue; Li Xiaoxia; Wang Nan; Zhang Yining	Singapore; Feng Tianwei; Li Jiawei; Wang Yuegu; Sun Beibei; Yu Mengyu	Hong Kong; Jiang Huajun; Lau Sui-fei; Lin Ling; Zhang Rui; Tie Ya Na
Women's team (Corbillon Cup)	China; Guo Yan; Guo Yue; Li Xiaoxia; Wang Nan; Zhang Yining	Singapore; Feng Tianwei; Li Jiawei; Wang Yuegu; Sun Beibei; Yu Mengyu	Japan; Hiroko Fujii; Ai Fukuhara; Sayaka Hirano; Haruna Fukuoka; Kasumi Ishikawa

== Results ==
=== Men's team ===
==== Final ====
2 March 2008; 19:30	Report	South Korea	0–3	China	Guangzhou Gymnasium, Guangzhou
Score by game:
Ryu Seung-Min	1–3	Ma Lin
Lee Jung-Woo	1–3	Wang Hao
Joo Se-Hyuk	0–3	Wang Liqin

==== Place 1–12 bracket ====
Ninth place
Singapore	1
Austria	3
Eleventh place
Russia	0
Denmark	3

Consolation semifinals
Singapore	3
Russia	1
Denmark	2
Austria	3

First round
Czech Republic	3
Singapore	2
Romania	3
Russia	1
Denmark	1
Chinese Taipei	3
Germany	3
Austria	2

Quarterfinals
China	3
Czech Republic	0
Romania	1
Hong Kong	3
Japan	3
Chinese Taipei	0
Germany	1
South Korea	3

Semifinals
China	3
Hong Kong	0
Japan	1
South Korea	3
5th–8th classification
Czech Republic	3
Romania	0
Chinese Taipei	3
Germany	1

Third Place
China	3
South Korea	0
Third place
Hong Kong	X
Japan	X
Fifth place
Czech Republic	3
Chinese Taipei	0
Seventh place
Romania	2
Germany	3

=== Women's team ===
==== Final ====
1 March 2008; 19:30	Report	Singapore	1–3	China	Guangzhou Gymnasium, Guangzhou
Score by game:
Li Jiawei	3–0	Guo Yue
Feng Tianwei	1–3	Zhang Yining
Wang Yuegu	0–3	Wang Nan
Li Jiawei	1–3	Zhang Yining

==== Place 1–12 bracket ====
Ninth place
Germany	3
Croatia	1
Eleventh place
United States	0
South Korea	3

Consolation semifinals
Germany	3
United States	0
Croatia	3
South Korea	0

First round
Romania	3
Germany	2
United States	2
Austria	3
Croatia	2
Hungary	3
South Korea	2
Netherlands	3

Quarterfinals
China	3
Romania	0
Austria	2
Hong Kong	3
Japan	3
Hungary	0
Netherlands	0
Singapore	3

Semifinals
China	3
Hong Kong	0
Japan	0
Singapore	3
5th–8th classification
Romania	1
Austria	3
Hungary	3
Netherlands	1

Final
China	3
Singapore	1
Third place
Hong Kong	X
Japan	X
Fifth place
Austria	0
Hungary	3
Seventh place
Romania	2
Netherlands	3
