= 2006 World Team Table Tennis Championships =

2006 edition of the World Team Table Tennis Championships

- Venue: AWD-Dome
- Location: Bremen, Germany
- Dates: 24 April–1 May

Champions
- Men: China
- Women: China

The 2006 Liebherr World Team Table Tennis Championships was held in the AWD-Dome of Bremen, Germany from April 24 to May 1, 2006. It is the 48th edition to be contested.

== Medal summary ==
=== Medal table ===
Rank	Nation	Gold	Silver	Bronze	Total
1	China (CHN)	2	0	0	2
2	Hong Kong (HKG)	0	1	1	2
3	South Korea (KOR)	0	1	0	1
4	Belarus (BLR)	0	0	1	1
4	Germany (GER)	0	0	1	1
4	Japan (JPN)	0	0	1	1
Totals (6 entries)		2	2	4	8

=== Events ===
Event	Gold	Silver	Bronze
Men's team (Swaythling Cup)	China; Wang Liqin; Ma Lin; Wang Hao; Chen Qi; Ma Long	South Korea; Joo Se-Hyuk; Ryu Seung-Min; Oh Sang-Eun; Lee Jung-Woo; Lim Jae-Hyun	Hong Kong; Cheung Yuk; Ko Lai Chak; Leung Chu Yan; Li Ching; Tse Ka Chun
Men's team (Swaythling Cup)	China; Wang Liqin; Ma Lin; Wang Hao; Chen Qi; Ma Long	South Korea; Joo Se-Hyuk; Ryu Seung-Min; Oh Sang-Eun; Lee Jung-Woo; Lim Jae-Hyun	Germany; Timo Boll; Zoltan Fejer-Konnerth; Jörg Roßkopf; Bastian Steger; Christian Süß
Women's team (Corbillon Cup)	China; Zhang Yining; Guo Yue; Guo Yan; Wang Nan; Li Xiaoxia	Hong Kong; Lau Sui-fei; Lin Ling; Zhang Rui; Tie Ya Na; Yu Kwok See	Belarus; Tatyana Kostromina; Veronika Pavlovich; Viktoria Pavlovich; Alexandra Privalova
Women's team (Corbillon Cup)	China; Zhang Yining; Guo Yue; Guo Yan; Wang Nan; Li Xiaoxia	Hong Kong; Lau Sui-fei; Lin Ling; Zhang Rui; Tie Ya Na; Yu Kwok See	Japan; Ai Fujinuma; Ai Fukuhara; Sayaka Hirano; Haruna Fukuoka; Saki Kanazawa

== Results ==
=== Men's team ===
==== Final ====
1 May 2006; 15:00	Report (PDF)	China	3–0	South Korea	AWD-Dome, Bremen
Score by game:
Wang Hao	3–0	Oh Sang-Eun
Wang Liqin	3–2	Ryu Seung-Min
Ma Lin	3–0	Lee Jung-Woo

==== Place 1–12 bracket ====
Ninth place
Sweden	2
Romania	3
Eleventh place
Belgium	2
Greece	3

Consolation semifinals
Belgium	0
Sweden	3
Greece	1
Romania	3

First round
Belgium	1
France	3
Russia	3
Sweden	1
Greece	1
Austria	3
Romania	1
Czech Republic	3

Quarterfinals
China	3
France	0
Russia	0
Germany	3
Hong Kong	3
Austria	1
Czech Republic	0
South Korea	3

Semifinals
China	3
Germany	1
Hong Kong	0
South Korea	3
5th–8th classification
France	0
Russia	3
Austria	2
Czech Republic	3

Final
China	3
South Korea	0
Third Place
Germany	X
Hong Kong	X
Fifth place
Russia	1
Czech Republic	3
Seventh place
France	3
Austria	2

=== Women's team ===
==== Final ====
30 April 2006; 16:00	Report (PDF)	China	3–1	Hong Kong	AWD-Dome, Bremen
Score by game:
Zhang Yining	3–0	Lin Ling
Guo Yue	1–3	Tie Yana
Wang Nan	3–2	Lau Sui-fei
Zhang Yining	3–0	Tie Yana

==== Place 1–12 bracket ====
Ninth place
Singapore	3
Croatia	2
Eleventh place
Czech Republic	1
Germany	3

Consolation semifinals
Singapore	3
Czech Republic	0
Croatia	3
Germany	1

First round
Singapore	2
North Korea	3
Belarus	3
Czech Republic	1
Hungary	3
Croatia	2
Austria	3
Germany	1

Quarterfinals
China	3
North Korea	0
Belarus	3
South Korea	1
Japan	3
Hungary	1
Austria	1
Hong Kong	3

Semifinals
China	3
Belarus	0
Japan	2
Hong Kong	3
5th–8th classification
North Korea	1
South Korea	3
Hungary	3
Austria	1

Final
China	3
Hong Kong	1
Third place
Belarus	X
Japan	X
Fifth place
South Korea	3
Hungary	1
Seventh place
North Korea	3
Austria	1
