= Yoshie Takada =

Japanese table tennis player

Personal information
- Nationality: Japanese
- Born: 1966

Sport
- Sport: Table tennis

Yoshie Takada (born 1966) is a Japanese table tennis player. Her highest career ITTF ranking was 21.

She won a bronze medal in the women's team event at the 2001 World Table Tennis Championships.
