= Victoria Pavlovich =

Belarusian table tennis player

Personal information
- Nationality: Belarusian
- Born: 8 May 1978 (age 47)

Sport
- Sport: Table tennis

Victoria Pavlovich (born 8 May 1978) is a Belarusian table tennis player. Her highest career ITTF ranking was 11.
