= Akiko Takeda =

Japanese table tennis player

Personal information
- Nationality: Japan
Medal record
Representing Japan
World Table Tennis Championships
Bronze medal – third place	2001	Women's Doubles

Akiko Takeda is a Japanese international table tennis player.

She won a bronze medal at the 2001 World Table Tennis Championships in the women's doubles with Mayu Kishi-Kawagoe.

== See also ==
- List of table tennis players
