= Joo Sae-hyuk =

South Korean table tennis player

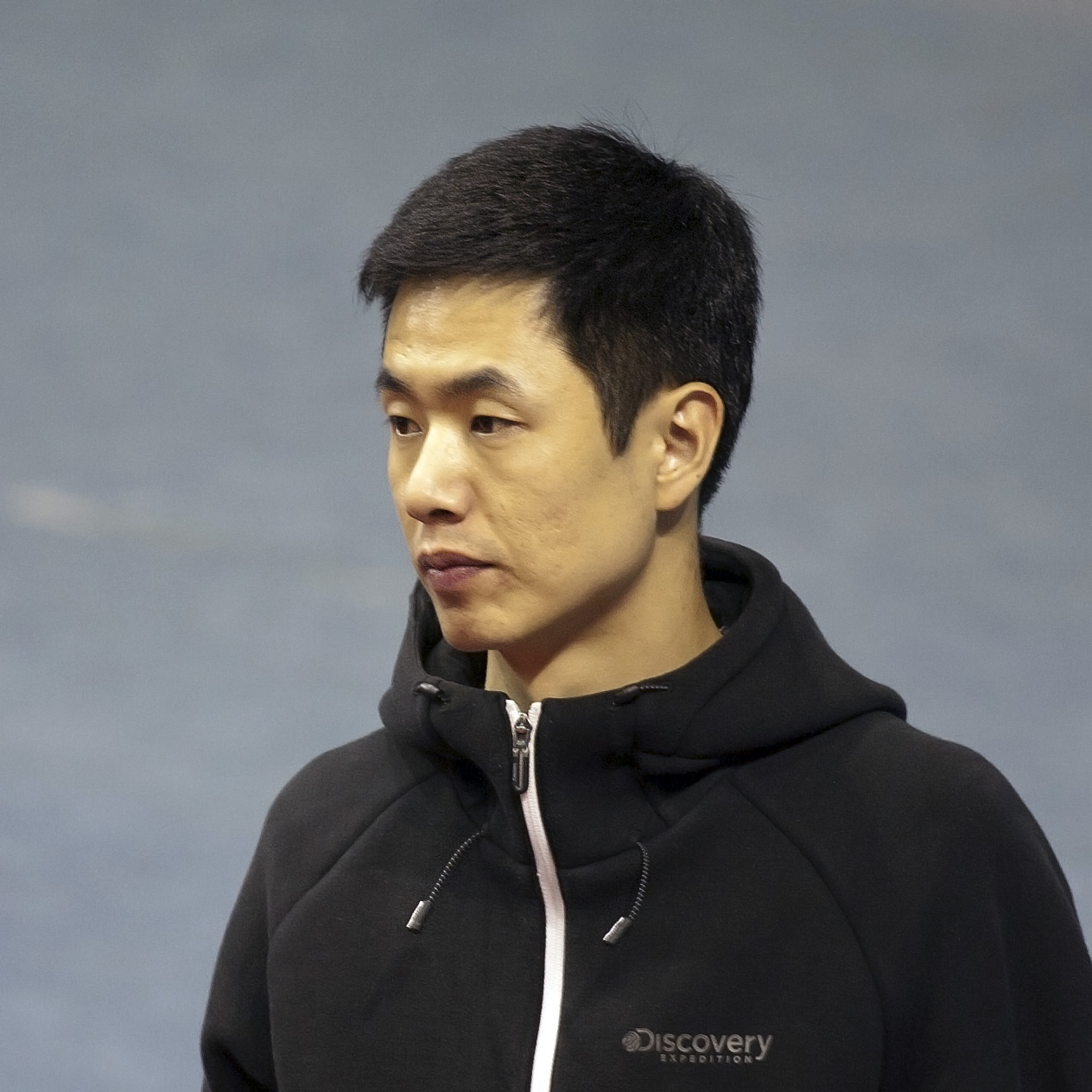
- ITTF World Tour 2017 German Open, Magdeburg, Germany, 7 Nov 2017 – 12 Nov 2017, Joo Sae-hyuk

Personal information
- Nicknames: 老朱(Old Joo), 世一削(World no.1 Chopper)
- Nationality: South Korea
- Born: 20 January 1980 (age 46) Seoul, South Korea
- Height: 1.83 m (6 ft 0 in)
- Weight: 68 kg (150 lb)

Sport
- Sport: Table tennis
- Playing style: Shakehand grip
- Equipment: Blade: Butterfly Joo Saehyuk Forehand: Tenergy 64 RED Backhand: TSP curl p1r
- Highest ranking: 5 (March 2012)
- Current ranking: 13 (February 2017)
Medal record
Olympic Games
Silver medal – second place	2012 London	Team
World Championships
Silver medal – second place	2003 Paris	Singles
Silver medal – second place	2006 Bremen	Team
Silver medal – second place	2008 Guangzhou	Team
Bronze medal – third place	2001 Osaka	Team
Bronze medal – third place	2004 Doha	Team
Bronze medal – third place	2010 Moscow	Team
Bronze medal – third place	2012 Dortmund	Team
Bronze medal – third place	2016 Kuala Lumpur	Team
Asian Games
Silver medal – second place	2002 Busan	Team
Silver medal – second place	2006 Doha	Team
Silver medal – second place	2010 Guangzhou	Team
Silver medal – second place	2014 Incheon	Team
Bronze medal – third place	2006 Doha	Mixed Doubles
Bronze medal – third place	2010 Guangzhou	Singles
Bronze medal – third place	2014 Incheon	Singles
World Cup
Bronze medal – third place	2011 Paris	Singles
Bronze medal – third place	2007 Atlanta	Team
Silver medal – second place	2009 Linz	Team
Silver medal – second place	2010 Dubai	Team
Silver medal – second place	2011 Magdeburg	Team

Joo Sae-hyuk (Korean: 주세혁, Korean pronunciation: [tɕu.se̞.ɦjʌk̚]; born 20 January 1980) is a South Korean former table tennis player and current coach of the Korean national table tennis team. As a singles player, he was a silver medalist at the 2003 World Table Tennis Championships, a bronze medalist at the 2011 Table Tennis World Cup, and a bronze medalist at the 2010 and 2014 Asian Games. In the team event, as a member of the South Korean National Team, he was a silver medalist in the 2002, 2006, 2010, and 2014 Asian Games; the 2006 and 2008 World Championships; and the 2012 Summer Olympics.

== History ==
Joo Sae-hyuk was born in Seoul, South Korea on January 20, 1980. He stands 180 cm tall, and weighs 68 kg. He first started competing when he was 8 years old. He joined the national team in 2001, and fans began taking an interest in him for his dynamic defensive style.

Between April and May 2012, Joo was diagnosed with Behçet's disease, Although Behcet's disease is known to be incurable, it appears that Joo is still performing well. On the medical side, he relies on glucocorticoids to manage his disease.

Joo retired in 2022 and was appointed the coach of the Korean men's national table tennis team.

== Style of Play ==
Joo has helped revive the popularity of the defensive style at the professional level. He is one of the few top-ranked players in the world (position 5 in 2012) to play a primarily defensive style, repeatedly returning the ball with heavy backspin on both wings. This has led many to dub him the best defensive player of all time. At the same time, Joo has a powerful topspin forehand that he uses to counterattack when the opportunity may arise. As with many defenders, his long rallies and entertaining style of play have made him a fan favourite. Joo is one of several foreign players in recent years to challenge China's dominance over the sport.

== Rankings ==
Since June 2003, the International Table Tennis Federation has consistently ranked Joo as one of the 40 best table tennis players in the world after he defeated Ma Lin. Since July 2006, he has been consistently ranked in the ITTF's top 20. His peak rating was at #5, in March 2012.

== Coaches ==
- Yang Ki-ho - Personal Coach
- Yoo Nam-kyu - National Coach
- Kim Taek-soo - National Coach
