= Tu Jong-sil =

North Korean table tennis player

Personal information
- Nationality: North Korea
- Born: October 12, 1978
Medal record
Representing North Korea
World Table Tennis Championships
Silver medal – second place	1997	women's team
Silver medal – second place	2001	women's team

Tu Jong-sil(두정실) is a former international table tennis player from North Korea.

== Table tennis career ==
She won two silver medals for North Korea at the 1997 World Table Tennis Championships and 2001 World Table Tennis Championships in the Corbillon Cup (women's team event).

She represented North Korea during the 1996 Olympic Games.

== See also ==
- List of World Table Tennis Championships medalists
