= Mihaela Steff =

Romanian table tennis player

Personal information
- Full name: Mihaela Ioana Steff Merutiu
- Nationality: Romania
- Born: 8 November 1978 (age 47) Bistrița

Sport
- Sport: Table tennis
Medal record
Women's table tennis
Representing Romania
World Championships
Bronze medal – third place	2000 Kuala Lumpur	Team
World Cup
Bronze medal – third place	2001 Wuhu	Singles
European Championships
Gold medal – first place	2002 Zagreb	Doubles
Gold medal – first place	2002 Zagreb	Team
Gold medal – first place	2003 Courmayeur	Doubles
Gold medal – first place	2005 Aarhus	Doubles
Gold medal – first place	2005 Aarhus	Team
Silver medal – second place	2000 Bremen	Singles
Silver medal – second place	2005 Aarhus	Singles
Bronze medal – third place	1998 Eindhoven	Doubles

Mihaela Steff is a former female table tennis player from Romania. From 1998 to 2005, she has won two medals in singles, doubles, and team events in the World Table Tennis Championships, in the Table Tennis World Cup, and in the Table Tennis European Championships.

== Career ==
Șteff is left-handed. She started playing table tennis at the age of nine. She was promoted by the coach Gheorghe Bogza, who also looked after well-known players such as Călin Creangă and Adrian Crişan. She won the national Romanian championships six times, in 1994 in doubles with Antonela Manac, in 1996 in singles, doubles (with Antonela Manac) and mixed (with Andrei Filimon), in 1997 in singles and in 2002 in mixed with Adrian Crișan.

In 1997 she joined Team Galaxy Lübeck in the German Bundesliga. In 1998 she won the European Cup with Lübeck. In 1999, she joined TuS Bad Driburg and in 2002 she moved to Müllermilch Langweid. In 2004 she left Germany for Italy to the Sterilgarda TT Castelgoffredo.

She was successful at the European Youth Championships, where she won gold once in singles, five times in doubles and once in mixed gold. At the European Championships for adults, she reached the final in the individual in 2000 and 2005. Together with Tamara Boroš, she became European champions in doubles in 2002, 2003 and 2005.

From 1995 to 2006 she took part in nine world championships for Romania. In 2000 and 2004 she qualified for the Olympic Games, where she reached the quarter-finals in both singles and doubles.

In autumn 2005 the Romanian national players Mihaela Șteff, Otilia Bădescu and Adriana Năstase-Simion-Zamfir refused to sign the contracts submitted by the Romanian table tennis association, according to which they forego 10% of the income from the ITTF Pro Tour in favor of the association. They were then expelled from the national team and for the European Table Tennis Championships in 2007 no longer considered.

== See also ==
- List of table tennis players
