= Åsa Svensson (table tennis) =

Swedish table tennis player (born 1971)

Personal information
- Nationality: Swedish
- Born: 11 February 1971 (age 55) Halmstad, Sweden

Sport
- Sport: Table tennis

Åsa Svensson (born 11 February 1971) is a Swedish former table tennis player. She competed at the 1996 Summer Olympics and the 2000 Summer Olympics. She later became a coach for Halmstad BTK until June 2017.
