= Ai Fujinuma =

Japanese table tennis player

Personal information
- Nationality: Japanese
- Born: 16 September 1982 (age 44) Utsunomiya, Japan

Sport
- Sport: Table tennis
Medal record
Representing Japan
Women's table tennis
World Championships
| Bronze medal – third place | 2004 Doha | Team |
| Bronze medal – third place | 2006 Bremen | Team |
| Bronze medal – third place | 2010 Moscow | Team |

Ai Fujinuma (藤沼 亜衣, Fujinuma Ai; born 16 September 1982) is a Japanese table tennis player. She was born in Utsunomiya. She competed in women's doubles at the 2000 Summer Olympics in Sydney, and in women's singles and women's doubles at the 2004 Summer Olympics in Athens.
