= Guo Yan =

Chinese table tennis player

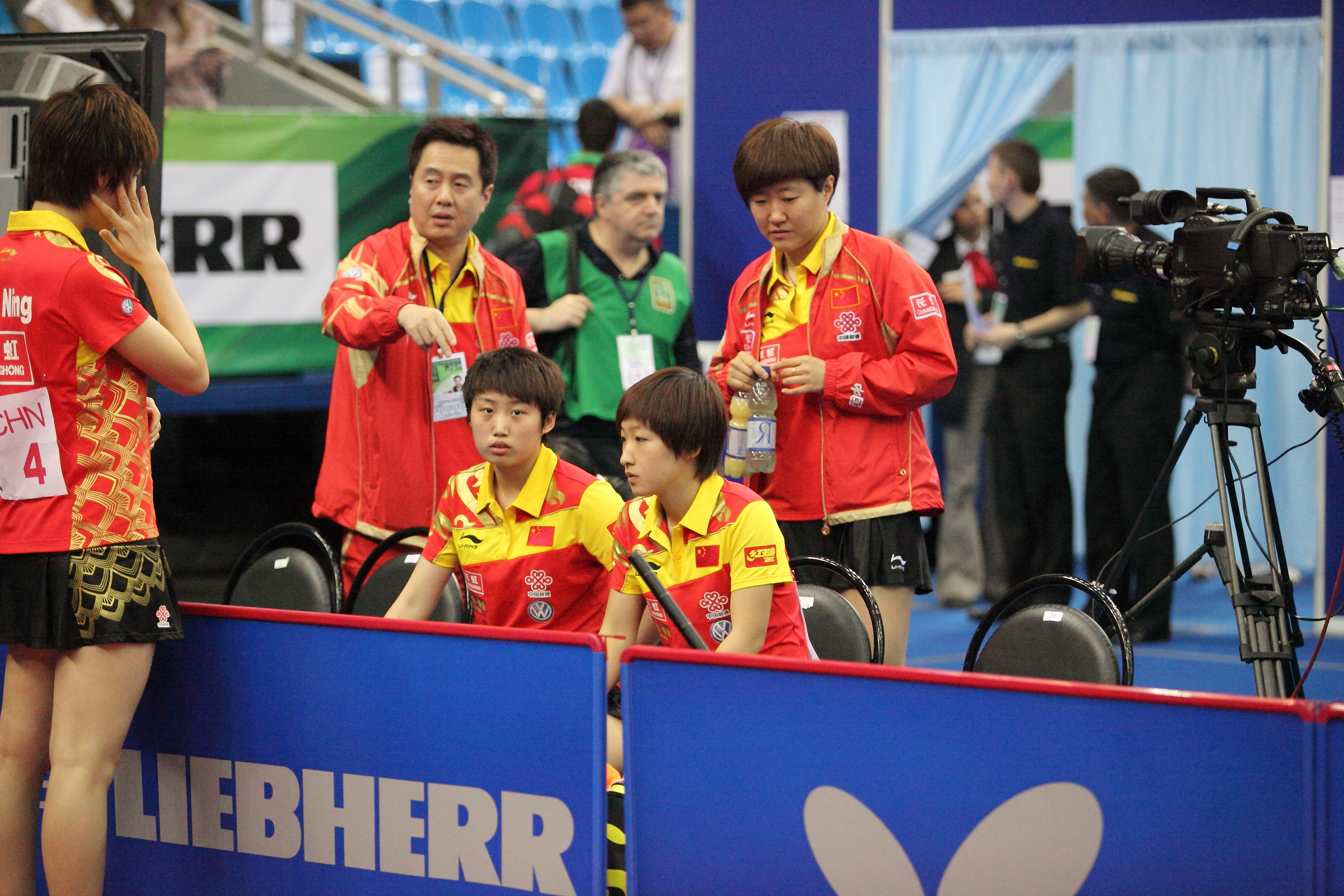

Personal information
- Full name: Guo Yan
- Nationality: China
- Born: 24 June 1982 (age 44) Beijing, China
- Height: 1.72 m (5 ft 8 in)
- Weight: 62 kg (137 lb)

Sport
- Sport: Table tennis
- Playing style: Right-handed, shakehand grip
- Highest ranking: 1 (Oct 2010 – Jan 2011)
Medal record
Women's table tennis
Representing China
World Championships
| Gold medal – first place | 2012 Dortmund | Team |
| Gold medal – first place | 2008 Guangzhou | Team |
| Gold medal – first place | 2006 Bremen | Team |
| Silver medal – second place | 2011 Rotterdam | Doubles |
| Silver medal – second place | 2010 Moscow | Team |
| Silver medal – second place | 2009 Yokohama | Doubles |
| Silver medal – second place | 2005 Shanghai | Singles |
| Bronze medal – third place | 2005 Shanghai | Doubles |
| Bronze medal – third place | 2007 Zagreb | Singles |
| Bronze medal – third place | 2005 Shanghai | Mixed Doubles |
World Cup
| Gold medal – first place | 2010 Kuala Lumpur | Singles |
| Gold medal – first place | 2006 Urumqi | Singles |
| Silver medal – second place | 2005 Guangzhou | Singles |

Guo Yan (Chinese: 郭焱, born 24 June 1982, in Beijing, China) is a Chinese table tennis player who won the World Cup twice, in 2006 and 2010. In February 2011, she ranked 2nd in the ITTF world ranking.

== Career records ==
Singles (as of February 3, 2011)

- World Championships: 3rd round (2003, lost to Otilia Bădescu); runner-up (2005); SF (2007)
- World Cup: winner (2006, 10); runner-up (2005)
- Pro Tour winner (4): Croatian, Swedish Open 2001; Korea Open 2003; English Open 2009.
  Runner-up (15): China (Hainan) Open 2001; Polish Open 2002; China (Guangzhou), Japan Open 2003; German Open 2004; Japan Open 2005; Japan Open 2006; Japan, China (Nanjing), Austria, Swedish Open 2007; Qatar, Korea, Singapore Open 2008; English Open 2011
- Pro Tour Grand Finals appearances: 7. Record: winner (2008, 09); SF (2001, 02, 03, 07).
- Asian Championships: SF (2007)
- Asian Cup: 1st (2005, 2011)

Women's doubles

- World Championships: runner-up (2009); SF (2005)
- Pro Tour winner (7): Korea Open 2002; China (Harbin) Open 2005; Slovenian, China (Shenzhen), French Open 2007; Kuwait Open 2010; English Open 2011
  Runner-up (8): Swedish Open 2001; China (Guangzhou), Japan Open 2003; Greek, German Open 2004; Kuwait Open 2007; English, Polish Open 2009
- Asian Games: SF (2002)

Mixed doubles

- World Championships: SF (2005)
- Asian Games: winner (2010)
- Asian Championships: SF (2003)

Team

- World Championships: 1st (2006, 08); 2nd (2010)
- World Team Cup: 1st (2010)
- Asian Games: 1st (2006, 10); 2nd (2002)
- Asian Championships: 1st (2003, 2007)
