= Tamara Boroš =

Croatian table tennis player (born 1977)

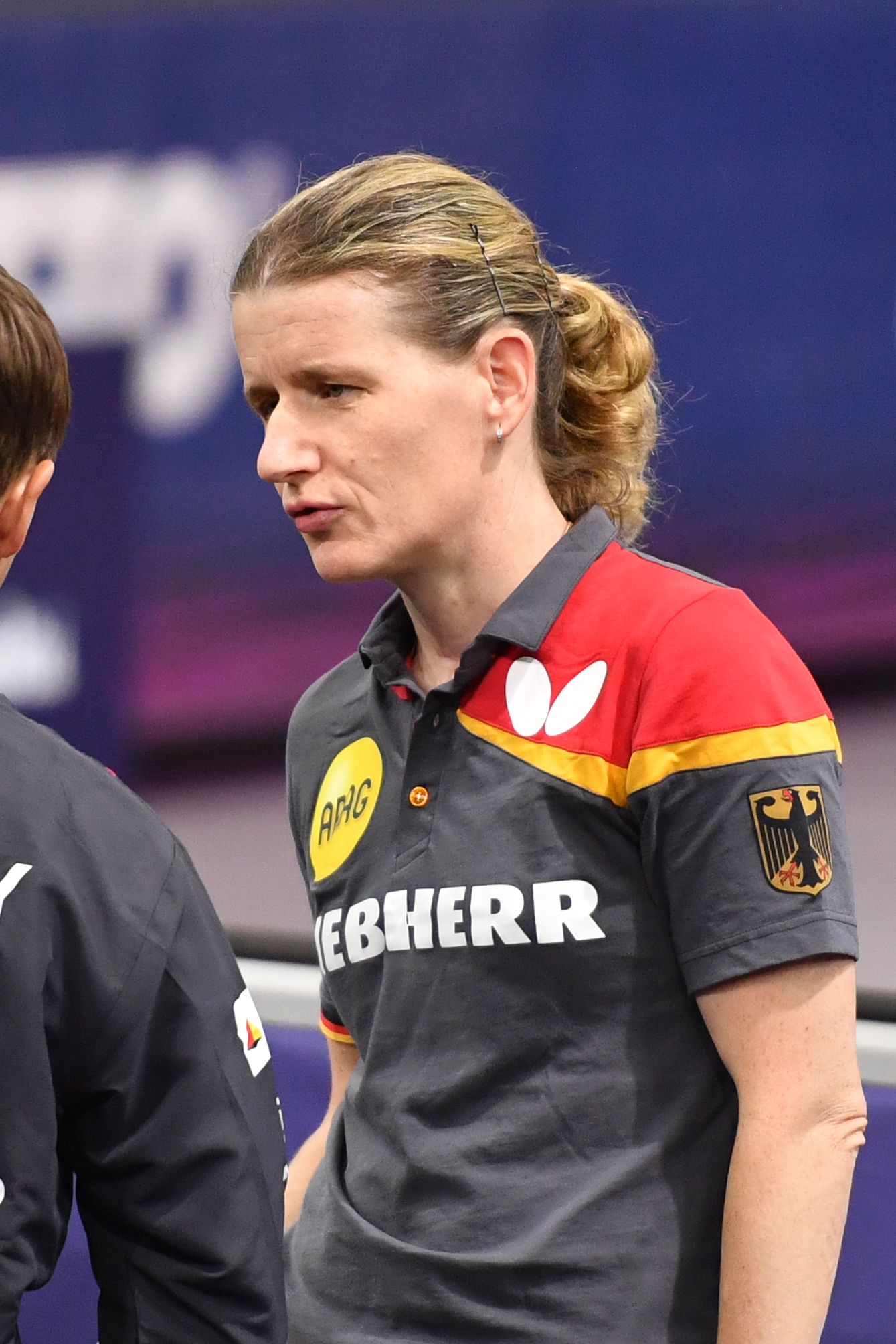

Personal information
- Nationality: Croatia
- Born: 19 December 1977 (age 48) Senta, SR Serbia, SFR Yugoslavia

Sport
- Sport: Table tennis
- Highest ranking: 2 (2002)
Medal record
Women's table tennis
Representing Croatia
World Championships
Bronze medal – third place	2003 Paris	Singles
European Championships
Gold medal – first place	2002 Zagreb	Doubles
Gold medal – first place	2003 Courmayeur	Doubles
Gold medal – first place	2005 Aarhus	Doubles
Silver medal – second place	1998 Eindhoven	Singles
Silver medal – second place	2003 Courmayeur	Team
Silver medal – second place	2005 Aarhus	Team
Bronze medal – third place	1998 Eindhoven	Doubles
Bronze medal – third place	2000 Bremen	Singles
Bronze medal – third place	2002 Zagreb	Singles
Bronze medal – third place	2005 Aarhus	Singles
Bronze medal – third place	2009 Stuttgart	Team
Mediterranean Games
Gold medal – first place	1997 Bari	Doubles
Gold medal – first place	2001 Tunis	Singles
Gold medal – first place	2005 Almeria	Singles
Silver medal – second place	1997 Bari	Singles

Tamara Boroš (born 19 December 1977) is a Croatian table tennis player. She is one of the relatively rare European players in modern times who has successfully competed at the highest level with players from Asian countries.

Boroš was born in a Hungarian family in Senta. As a junior, she played for the local table tennis club STK Senta. After the outbreak of Yugoslav Wars in 1991, she stayed in Sweden, finally settling in Zagreb, Croatia (with her parents) in 1993. Neven Cegnar became her new coach.

In 2002, Boroš reached a career-high world ranking at No. 2.

She won the bronze medal at the 2003 World Table Tennis Championships. She is one of only two non-Asian players to have won a women's singles medal at World Championships over the last 50 years (from 1977 to 2026).

She has won 12 medals at European Table Tennis Championships. In 1998, she won silver, while in 2000, 2002, and 2005 she won bronze medals in women's singles. She is a three-time European Champion in women's doubles (2002, 2003, and 2005). With the Croatian national team, she has won silver medals in 2003 and 2005, and bronze in 2000, 2008, and 2009.

At the Mediterranean Games, she has won gold medals in 2001 and 2005, and a silver medal in 1997 in the women's singles event. She has also won a gold medal in the 1997 women's doubles event.

Boroš retired from competitive table tennis in 2012. After working as a coach at the Werner Schlager Academy in Vienna, in 2017 Boroš started working for the German Table Tennis Association, coaching the national U-23 team in Düsseldorf. Since 2021, she has been coaching the German national Women's team.

In 2015, Boroš was inducted into the European Table Tennis Hall of Fame.
