= Xu Jing (table tennis) =

Taiwanese table tennis player

Xu Jing (simplified Chinese: 徐竞; traditional Chinese: 徐競, born 8 January 1968 in Liaoning) is a Chinese-born table tennis player who represented Chinese Taipei at the 1996 Summer Olympics and 2000 Summer Olympics. She also won a bronze medal at the 1994 Asian Games and a bronze medal at the 1998 Asian Games.

In the 1990s she was considered the second-best Taiwanese female player after Chen Jing (also born and raised in P.R. China). Together they won silver at the 2000 World Team Table Tennis Championships, which was Taiwan's best finish.

She has been coaching in mainland China in recent years.
