= Kim Yun-mi (table tennis) =

North Korean table tennis player (born 1981)

Personal information
- Nationality: North Korea
- Born: 28 April 1981 (age 45)
Medal record
Representing North Korea
World Table Tennis Championships
Silver medal – second place	2001	Women's Team
Bronze medal – third place	2001	Women's Singles

Kim Yun-mi (Korean: 김윤미; born 28 April 1981) is a North Korean international table tennis player.

She won a silver medal and bronze medal at the 2001 World Table Tennis Championships.

== See also ==
- List of table tennis players
