= Kim Hyon-hui (table tennis) =

North Korean table tennis player (born 1979)

Personal information
- Full name: Kim Hyon-hui
- Nationality: North Korea
- Born: 15 September 1979 (age 46)

Sport
- Sport: Table tennis

Kim Hyon-hui (Korean: 김현희, born 15 September 1979) is a former table tennis player from North Korea. Kim is a Merited Athlete. Kim later married a University student, and thus retired.
