= Song Ah Sim =

Hong Kong table tennis player

Personal information
- Full name: Song Ah Sim
- Nationality: Hong Kong
- Born: 17 August 1981 (age 44) Hebei, China
- Height: 1.6 m (5 ft 3 in)
- Weight: 54 kg (119 lb)

Sport
- Sport: Table tennis

Song Ah Sim (Chinese: 桑亞嬋; Jyutping: song^{1} aa^{3} sim^{4}, born 17 August 1981) is a Chinese table tennis player who competed in the 2000 Summer Olympics and 2004 Summer Olympics for Hong Kong.
