= Zhang Rui (table tennis, born 1979) =

Hong Kong table tennis player

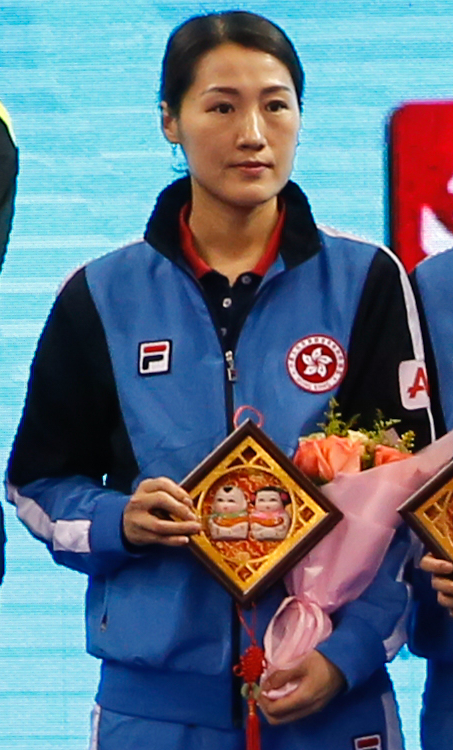
- Zhang at the 2017 Asian Table Tennis Championships

Personal information
- Born: 25 January 1979 (age 47) Shenyang, Liaoning, China

Sport
- Sport: Table tennis
- Playing style: Right-handed penhold
- Highest ranking: 16 (April 2005)
Medal record
Representing Hong Kong
Women's Table tennis
Asian Games
Silver medal – second place	2006 Doha	Doubles

Zhang Rui
- Traditional Chinese: 張瑞
- Simplified Chinese: 张瑞
Transcriptions
Standard Mandarin
- Hanyu Pinyin: Zhāng Ruì
Yue: Cantonese
- Jyutping: zoeng^{1} seoi^{6}

Zhang Rui (Chinese: 張瑞; born 25 January 1979) is a table tennis player from Liaoning, China. She won a silver medal at the 2006 Asian Games for Hong Kong in the doubles competition.
