= Sun Jin =

Chinese table tennis player

Personal information
- Nationality: China
- Born: 13 April 1980 (age 46)

Sport
- Sport: Table tennis
Medal record
Women's table tennis
Representing China
Olympic Games
Silver medal – second place	2000 Sydney	Doubles

Sun Jin (Chinese: 孙晋; born March 13, 1980) is a Chinese table tennis player. She won a silver medal at 2000 Sydney Olympic Games in women's doubles, with Yang Ying.
