= Csilla Bátorfi =

Hungarian table tennis player

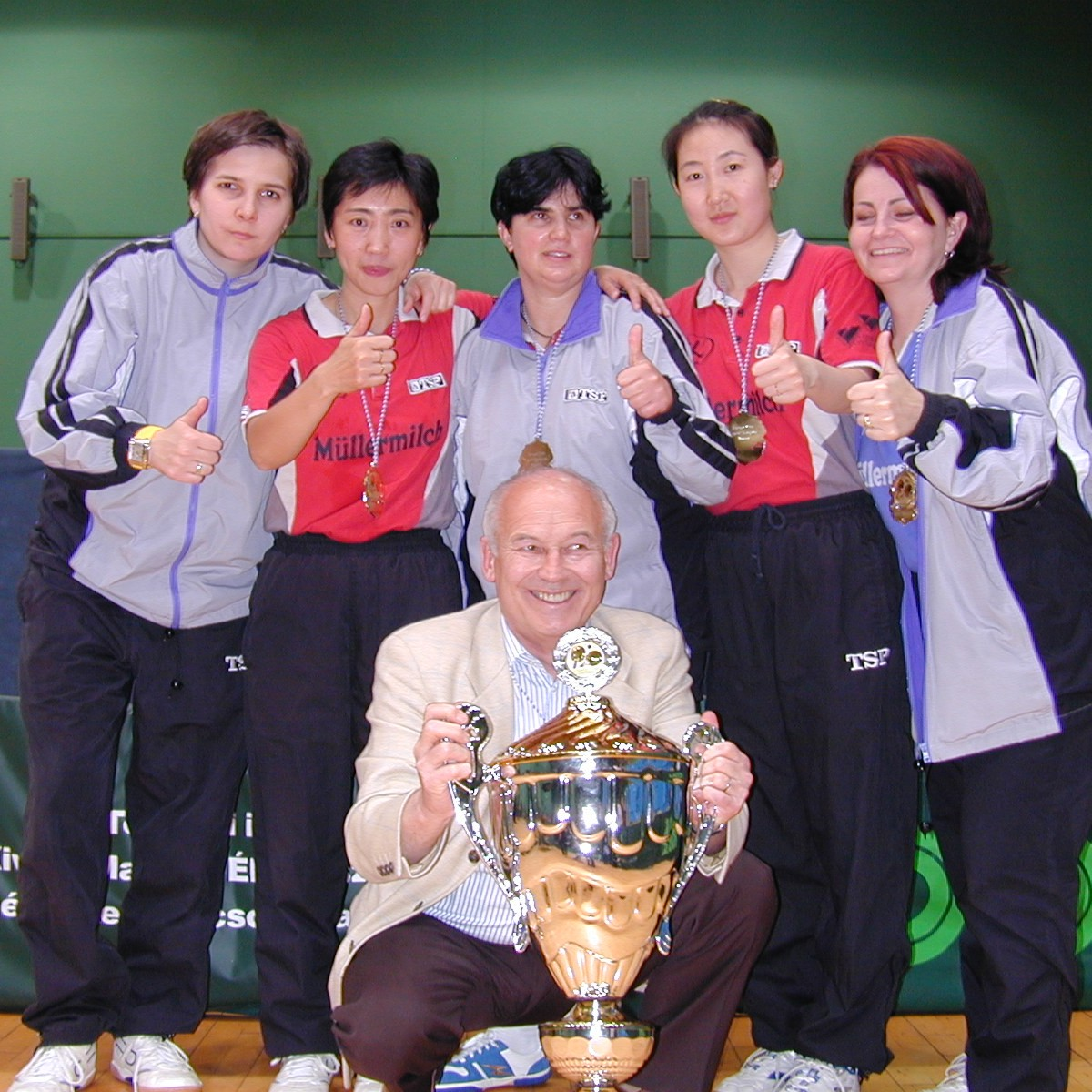

Personal information
- Nationality: Hungary
- Born: 3 March 1969 (age 57)

Sport
- Sport: Table tennis
- Playing style: right-handed
Medal record
Women's table tennis
Representing Hungary
European Championships
Gold medal – first place	1986 Prague	Single

Csilla Bátorfi (born 3 March 1969 in Szombathely) is a Hungarian table tennis player. She competed at five consecutive Olympic Games from 1988 (when the sport first appeared at the Games) to 2004. She won several titles in European Championships.

She is the first female table tennis player to compete at five Olympics. Six men share this honor with her: Swede Jörgen Persson, Croatian Zoran Primorac, Belgian Jean-Michel Saive, Serbian-American Ilija Lupulesku, Swede Jan-Ove Waldner, and German Jörg Roßkopf.

She was named Hungarian Sportswoman of The Year in 1986 after becoming European champion the same year.

== See also ==
- List of athletes with the most appearances at Olympic Games

Awards
Preceded by Éva Fórián	Hungarian Sportswoman of The Year; 1986	Succeeded by Mariann Engrich
