= Kim Hyang-mi (table tennis) =

North Korean table tennis player (born 1979)

Personal information
- Nationality: North Korea
- Born: 19 September 1979 (age 46)

Sport
- Sport: Table tennis
Medal record
Women's table tennis
Representing North Korea
Olympic Games
Silver medal – second place	2004 Athens	Singles
World Championships
Silver medal – second place	2001 Osaka	Team
Asian Games
Gold medal – first place	2002 Busan	Team

- Kim Hyang-mi
- Hangul: 김향미
- RR: Gim Hyangmi
- MR: Kim Hyangmi

Kim Hyang-mi (Korean: 김향미; born 19 September 1979) is a North Korean Olympic table tennis player.

She was able to compete in the 2004 Summer Olympics in Athens through the wildcard system, and surprised spectators by winning a silver medal in the women's singles, after being defeated in the final by China's Zhang Yining. Kim later married a University student, and thus retired.
