= Kim Moo-kyo =

South Korean table tennis player (born 1975)

Personal information
- Nationality: South Korea
- Born: 27 August 1975 (age 50)

Sport
- Sport: Table tennis
Medal record
Women's table tennis
Representing South Korea
Olympic Games
Bronze medal – third place	2000 Sydney	Doubles
World Championships
Silver medal – second place	1995 Tianjin	Team
Silver medal – second place	2001 Osaka	Mixed doubles
Bronze medal – third place	1993 Gothenburg	Team
Bronze medal – third place	1999 Eindhoven	Doubles
Bronze medal – third place	2000 Kuala Lumpur	Team
Bronze medal – third place	2001 Osaka	Team

Kim Moo-Kyo (Korean: 김무교; Hanja: 金戊校; born August 27, 1975 in Gyeongju, North Gyeongsang Province, South Korea) is a former female table tennis player from South Korea.

== Olympic career ==
Kim Moo-Kyo, Has performed in 2 olympics repressing South Korea in table tennis her first Olympic appearance, was in the 1996 Summer Olympics, She placed 4th with her partner Park Young-Jae She then, Participated in the 2000 Summer Olympics and achieved bronze in the women’s doubles with her partner Ryu Ji-Hye against Hungary
