= Otilia Bădescu =

Romanian table tennis player (born 1970)

Personal information
- Full name: Otilia Bădescu
- Nationality: Romania
- Born: 31 October 1970 (age 55) Bucharest, Romania
- Height: 1.61
- Weight: 58 kg (128 lb)

Sport
- Sport: Table tennis
- Playing style: Shakehand grip
Medal record
Women's table tennis
Representing Romania
World Championships
| Bronze medal – third place | 1991 Chiba City | Mixed Doubles |
| Bronze medal – third place | 1993 Gothenburg | Singles |
| Bronze medal – third place | 2000 Kuala Lumpur | Women's Team |
European Championships
| Gold medal – first place | 1992 Stuttgart | Mixed Doubles |
| Gold medal – first place | 1992 Stuttgart | Women's Team |
| Gold medal – first place | 1998 Eindhoven | Mixed Doubles |
| Gold medal – first place | 2003 Courmayeur | Singles |
| Gold medal – first place | 2005 Aarhus | Women's Team |
| Silver medal – second place | 1988 Paris | Singles |
| Silver medal – second place | 1994 Birmingham | Mixed Doubles |
| Silver medal – second place | 1996 Bratislava | Mixed Doubles |
| Silver medal – second place | 1998 Eindhoven | Doubles |
| Bronze medal – third place | 1986 Prague | Singles |
| Bronze medal – third place | 1986 Prague | Doubles |
| Bronze medal – third place | 1988 Paris | Doubles |
| Bronze medal – third place | 1988 Paris | Mixed Doubles |
| Bronze medal – third place | 1990 Gothenburg | Singles |
| Bronze medal – third place | 1996 Bratislava | Doubles |
| Bronze medal – third place | 2003 Courmayeur | Women's Team |
| Bronze medal – third place | 2003 Courmayeur | Mixed Doubles |

Otilia Bădescu, born 31 October 1970 in Bucharest, Romania, is a former Romanian table tennis player.

== Table tennis career ==
From 1986 to 2005 she won several medals in singles, doubles, and team events in the Table Tennis European Championships and three medals in the World Table Tennis Championships.

Her three World Championship medals were all bronze medals won in the singles, team event and mixed doubles with Kalinikos Kreanga.

== See also ==
- List of table tennis players
- List of World Table Tennis Championships medalists
