= Lau Sui Fei =

Hong Kong table tennis player

Lau Sui-fei
Personal information
- Nationality: Hong Konger
- Born: 3 July 1981 (age 45) Jiangsu, China
- Height: 162 cm (5 ft 4 in)
- Weight: 59 kg (130 lb)

Sport
- Sport: Table tennis
- Playing style: Offensive, fast, close to the table
- Highest ranking: 10 (since Jan 2001)
- Current ranking: 39

Lau Sui-fei (Chinese: 柳絮飛; pinyin: Liǔ Xùfēi; Jyutping: lau^{5} seoi^{6} fei^{1}) is a table tennis player. She competed at the Beijing 2008 Summer Olympics and the Athens 2004 Summer Olympics. She started playing table tennis when she was eight.

== See also ==
- Hong Kong, China at the 2008 Summer Paralympics
