= Krisztina Tóth (table tennis) =

Hungarian table tennis player

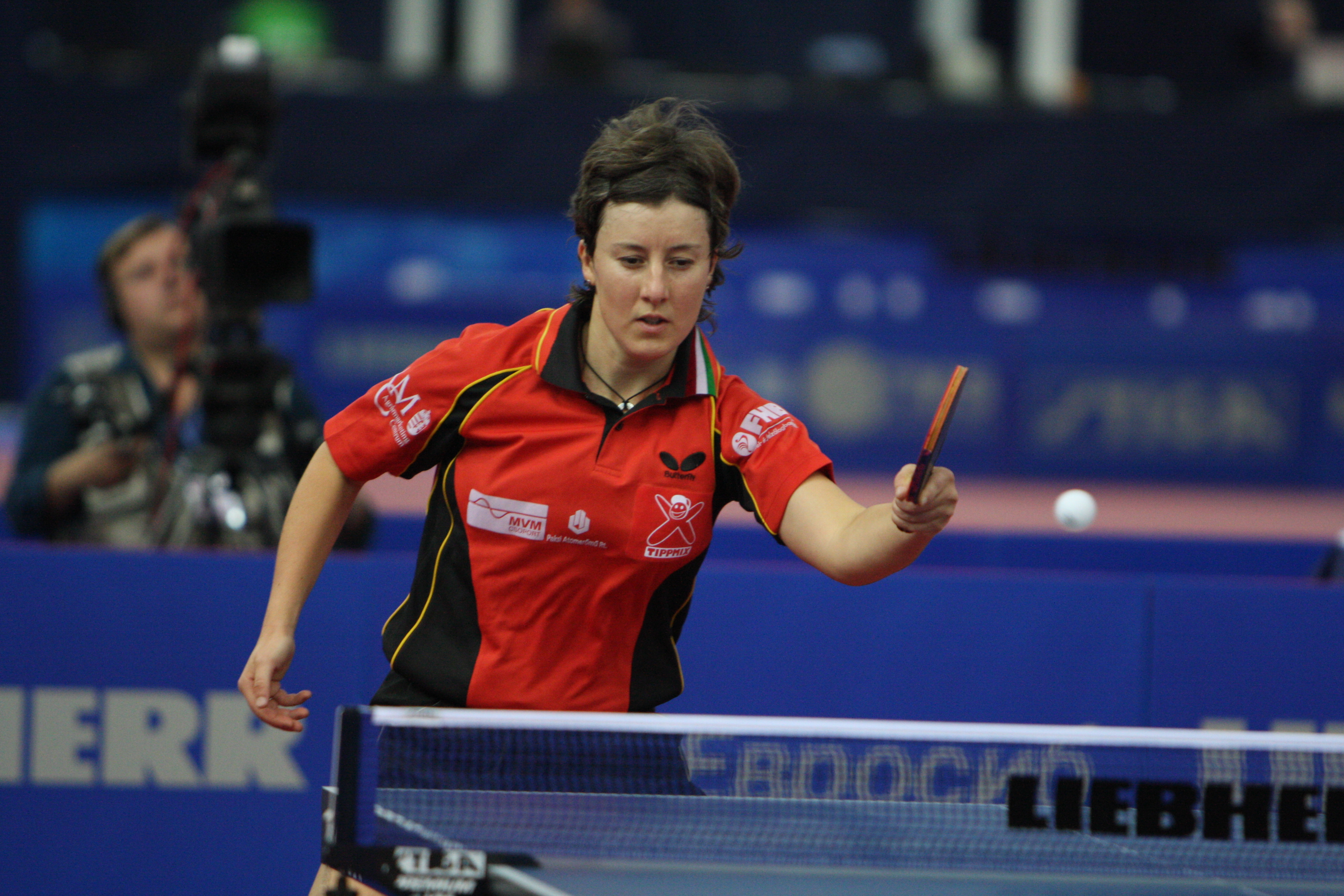

Personal information
- Full name: TOTH Krisztina
- Nicknames: Kriszti, Kriszta, Tothi
- Nationality: Hungary
- Born: 29 May 1974 (age 52) Miskolc, Hungary
- Height: 1.64 m (5 ft 5 in)

Sport
- Sport: Table tennis
- Club: FSV Kroppach
- Playing style: Left-handed, shakehand grip
- Equipment: Butterfly
- Highest ranking: 13 (December 2003)
Medal record
Women's table tennis
Representing Hungary
World Championships
| Bronze medal – third place | 1995 Tianjin | Doubles |
World Cup
| Bronze medal – third place | 1995 Atlanta | Team |
| Bronze medal – third place | 2007 Magdeburg | Team |
European Championships
| Gold medal – first place | 1994 Birmingham | Doubles |
| Gold medal – first place | 1996 Bratislava | Mixed Doubles |
| Gold medal – first place | 2000 Bremen | Doubles |
| Gold medal – first place | 2000 Bremen | Team |
| Gold medal – first place | 2003 Courmayeur | Mixed Doubles |
| Gold medal – first place | 2007 Belgrade | Team |
| Gold medal – first place | 2008 Saint-Petersburg | Doubles |
| Silver medal – second place | 1996 Bratislava | Singles |
| Silver medal – second place | 1996 Bratislava | Team |
| Silver medal – second place | 1998 Eindhoven | Team |
| Silver medal – second place | 2002 Zagreb | Singles |
| Silver medal – second place | 2003 Courmayeur | Doubles |
| Silver medal – second place | 2005 Aarhus | Doubles |
| Silver medal – second place | 2007 Belgrade | Doubles |
| Silver medal – second place | 2008 Saint-Petersburg | Team |
| Silver medal – second place | 2012 Herning | Doubles |
| Bronze medal – third place | 1998 Eindhoven | Singles |
| Bronze medal – third place | 2005 Aarhus | Mixed Doubles |
| Bronze medal – third place | 2007 Belgrade | Mixed Doubles |
| Bronze medal – third place | 2008 Saint-Petersburg | Singles |
| Bronze medal – third place | 2010 Ostrava | Doubles |
| Bronze medal – third place | 2011 Sopot-Gdansk | Doubles |

Krisztina Tóth (born 29 May 1974 in Miskolc, Hungary) is a Hungarian table tennis player from Gödöllő (Hungary), who currently resides in Augsburg, Germany. She has won several medals in single, doubles, and team events in the Table Tennis European Championships, the Table Tennis World Cup, and the World Table Tennis Championships.

== General interest ==
Tóth began playing table tennis at the age of 8 in her hometown Gödöllő. She was inspired to do so by her uncle, who was a professional table tennis player. She still plays with her very first racket.

In 2008, she became an honorary citizen of Gödöllő.

== Career records ==
Singles (as of 10 November 2011)

- Olympics: round of 16 (2000)
- World Championships: round of 16 (2001, 05, 09)
- World Cup appearances: 6. Record: 9–12th (1997, 98, 2001, 02, 10)
- Pro Tour winner (2): 2004 Danish Open; 2005 Russian Open
  Runner-up (4): 2000 Croatian Open; 2003 Danish Open; 2008 Austrian Open; 2010 Slovenian Open
- Pro Tour Grand Finals appearances: 1. Record: QF (2000)
- European Championships: runner-up (1996, 2002); SF (1998, 2008)
- Europe Top-12: 2nd (2005); 3rd (2003, 10)

Women's doubles

- Olympics: 4th (2000)
- World Championships: SF (1995)
- Pro Tour winner (6): 1998 Croatian Open; 1999 Qatar, German Open; 2004 Chile, Brazil Open; 2005 Russian Open
  Runner-up (4): 1996 Italian Open; 2004 Danish Open; 2005 Qatar Open; 2006 Russian Open
- Pro Tour Grand Finals appearances: 2. Record: QF (1996, 99)
- European Championships: winner (1994, 2000, 08); runner-up (2003, 05, 07)

Mixed doubles

- World Championships: round of 16 (1993, 95, 97, 99)
- European Championships: winner (1996, 2003); SF (2005, 07)

Team

- World Championships: 5th (2008)
- World Team Cup: 3rd (1995, 2007)
- European Championships: 1st (2000, 07); 2nd (1996, 98, 2008)

== See also ==
- List of table tennis players
