= Seok Eun-mi =

South Korean table tennis player

Personal information
- Nationality: South Korea
- Born: 25 December 1976 (age 49)
Medal record
Women's table tennis
Representing South Korea
Olympic Games
Silver medal – second place	2004 Athens	Doubles
World Championships
Bronze medal – third place	2000 Kuala Lumpur	Team
Bronze medal – third place	2001 Osaka	Team
Bronze medal – third place	2003 Paris	Doubles
Asian Games
Gold medal – first place	2002 Busan	Doubles

- Korean name
- Hangul: 석은미
- Hanja: 石銀美
- RR: Seok Eunmi
- MR: Sŏk Ŭnmi

Seok Eun-Mi (born December 25, 1976) is a female South Korean table tennis player who competed in the 2004 Summer Olympics.

She won the gold medal in the women's doubles competition together with Lee Eun-sil in the 2002 Asian Games.

She won the silver medal in the women's doubles competition together with Lee Eun-sil.
