= Niu Jianfeng =

Chinese table tennis player

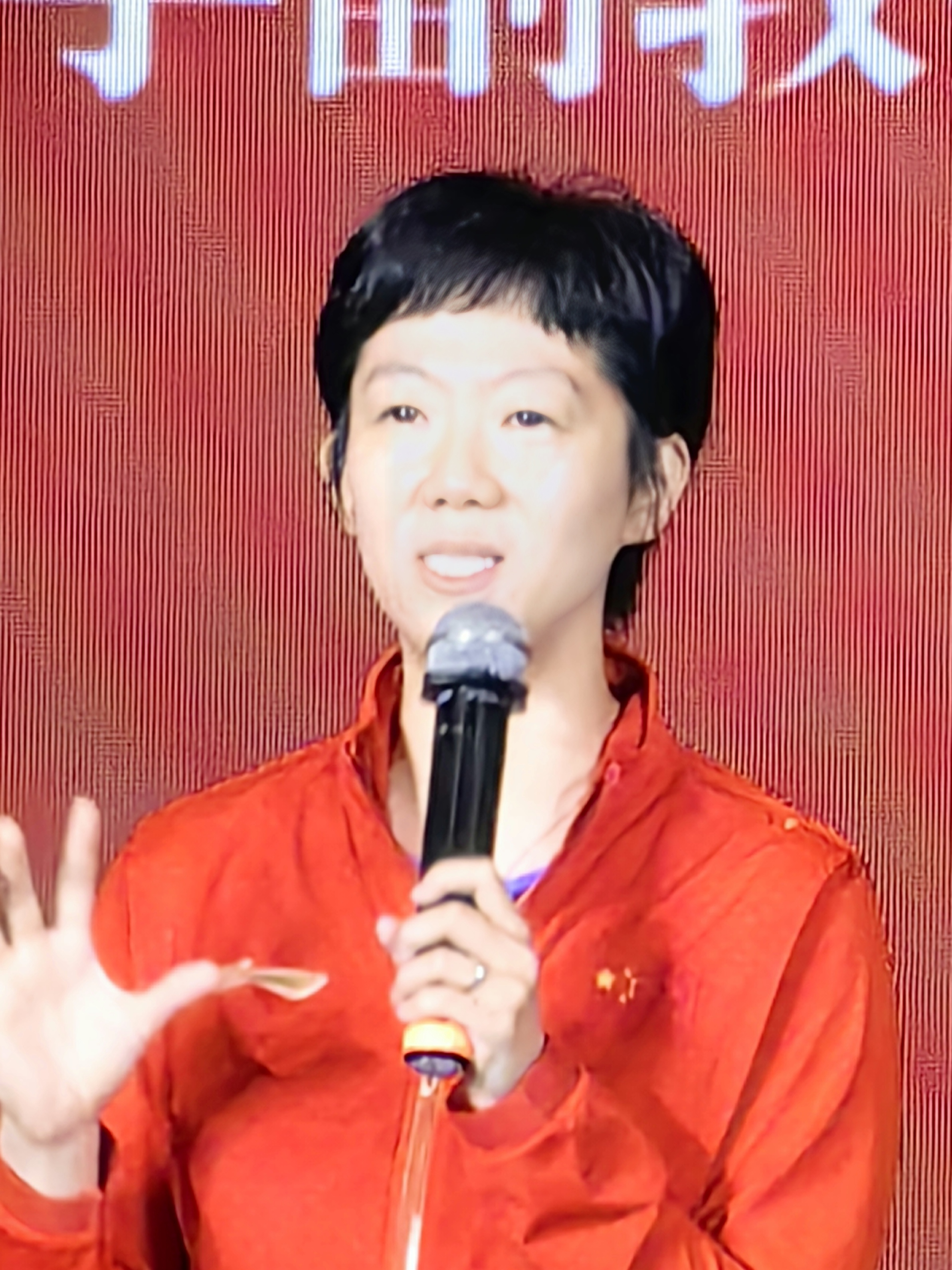
- Niu Jianfeng (2026)

Personal information
- Nationality: China
- Born: 3 April 1981 (age 45)

Sport
- Sport: Table tennis
Medal record
Women's table tennis
Bronze medal – third place	2004 Athens	Doubles

Niu Jianfeng (simplified Chinese: 牛剑锋; traditional Chinese: 牛劍鋒; pinyin: Niú Jiànfēng; born on April 3, 1981, in Baoding, Hebei) is a Chinese table tennis player who competed in the 2004 Summer Olympics.

She won the bronze medal in the women's doubles competition together with Guo Yue. In the women's singles competition she was eliminated in round 16.
