= Lee Eun-sil =

South Korean table tennis player

Personal information
- Nationality: South Korea
- Born: 25 December 1976 (age 49)

Sport
- Sport: Table tennis
Medal record
Women's table tennis
Representing South Korea
Olympic Games
Silver medal – second place	2004 Athens	Doubles
World Championships
Bronze medal – third place	2000 Kuala Lumpur	Team
Bronze medal – third place	2001 Osaka	Team
Bronze medal – third place	2003 Paris	Doubles
Asian Games
Gold medal – first place	2002 Busan	Doubles

- Korean name
- Hangul: 이은실
- Hanja: 李恩實
- RR: I Eunsil
- MR: I Ŭnsil

Lee Eun-Sil (born December 25, 1976) is a South Korean table tennis player who competed at the 2000 Summer Olympics and the 2004 Summer Olympics.

She won the gold medal in the women's doubles competition together with Seok Eun-Mi in the 2002 Asian Games.

She won the silver medal in the women's doubles competition together with Seok Eun-Mi in the 2004 Summer Olympics.
