= Yang Ying (table tennis, born 1977) =

Chinese table tennis player

Personal information
- Nationality: China
- Born: 13 July 1977 (age 49)

Sport
- Sport: Table tennis
Medal record
Women's table tennis
Representing China
Silver medal – second place	2000 Sydney	Doubles

Yang Ying (Chinese: 杨影, born 13 July 1977) is a Chinese table tennis player from Xuzhou, Jiangsu Province. She achieved gold medals at several World Table Tennis Championships in either doubles or team play. She played right-handed Chinese penhold style. Her main techniques were forehand and backhand speed drives. Since 2008 Yang has been working as a table tennis commentator for CCTV-5.

== Career performance ==
- 4th Table Tennis World Cup (1995) Women's Team Gold.
- 44th World Table Tennis Championship (1997) Women's Team Gold.
- 44th World Table Tennis Championship (1997) Women's Double Gold.
- 13th Asian Games (1998) Table Tennis Women's Team Gold.
- 45th World Table Tennis Championship (1999) Women's Double Silver.
- 27th Olympic Games (2000) Table Tennis Women's Double Silver.
- International Table Tennis Tournament (2001) Grand Finals Women's Double Gold.
- 46th World Table Tennis Championship (2001) Women's Team Gold.
- 46th World Table Tennis Championship (2001) Women's Double Silver.
- 46th World Table Tennis Championship (2001) Mixed Double Gold.
