= Li Ju (table tennis) =

Chinese table tennis player

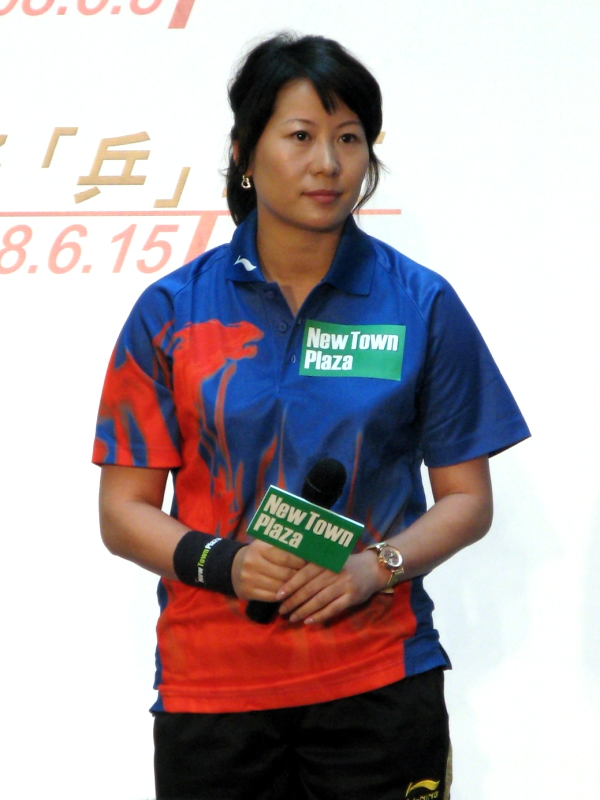

Personal information
- Full name: Li Ju
- Nationality: China
- Born: 22 January 1976 (age 50) Nantong, Jiangsu, China

Sport
- Sport: Table tennis
- Playing style: right-handed
Medal record
Women's table tennis
Representing China
Olympic Games
Gold medal – first place	2000 Sydney	Doubles
Silver medal – second place	2000 Sydney	Singles

Li Ju (Chinese: 李菊; pinyin: Lǐ Jú; born on January 22, 1976, in Nantong, Jiangsu) is a Chinese table tennis player.

== Achievements ==
- 1996 Asian Cup - 1st team, 2nd singles
- 1997 World Championships - 1st team, 2nd doubles (with Wang Nan), 3rd singles
- 1997 World Cup - 2nd singles
- 1997 Australian Open - 2nd singles & doubles (with Wang Chen)
- 1997 China Grand Prix - 1st singles, 3rd doubles (with Wang Nan)
- 1997 ITTF Pro Tour Grand Finals - 1st singles
- 1997 National Games - 1st team, 2nd doubles (with Wu Na)
- 1998 Ericsson China Open Challenge - Chief player to take up the challenges
- 1998 China All Stars Tournament - 1st doubles (with Wang Nan)
- 1998 Japan Open - 1st singles & doubles (with Wang Nan)
- 1998 Asian Championships - 1st singles & team
- 1998 Bangkok Asian Games - 1st doubles (with Wang Nan) & team, 2nd singles
- 1999 ITTF Pro Tour Grand Finals - 1st doubles (with Wang Nan)
- 1999 Ericsson China Open Challenge Finals - 1st singles
- 1999 Asia-Top 12 - 2nd singles
- 1999 Eindhoven World Championships - 1st doubles
- 2000 Kuala Lumpur World Team Championships - 1st team
- 2000 Sydney Olympic Games - 1st doubles, 2nd singles
- 2000 Japan Open - 2nd singles
- 2001 World Championships - 1st doubles & team, but lose to Kim Yun-mi in 2nd round of singles.
- 2001 World Women's Club Championship - 1st team
- 2003 World Championships - 1st doubles (with Wang Nan)
- 2003 China Grand Prix - 1st doubles (with Bai Yang, first title won after her comeback)
