= Ryu Ji-hye =

South Korean table tennis player

Personal information
- Nationality: South Korea
- Born: 10 February 1976 (age 50)

Sport
- Sport: Table tennis
Medal record
Women's table tennis
Representing South Korea
Olympic Games
Bronze medal – third place	1996 Atlanta	Doubles
Bronze medal – third place	2000 Sydney	Doubles
World Championships
Silver medal – second place	1995 Tianjin	Team
Bronze medal – third place	1995 Tianjin	Mixed doubles
Bronze medal – third place	1999 Eindhoven	Singles
Bronze medal – third place	2000 Kuala Lumpur	Team
Bronze medal – third place	2001 Osaka	Team

Ryu Ji-Hye (Korean: 류지혜; Hanja: 柳智恵; born February 10, 1976, in Busan, South Korea) is a former female table tennis player from South Korea.

== Career ==
=== 1996 ===
She got the bronze medal in the women's double at the 1996 Olympics.
