= Table tennis at the 2006 Asian Games – Women's singles =

Women's singles at the 2006 Asian Games
- Venue: Al-Arabi Indoor Hall
- Dates: 2–7 December 2006
- Competitors: 33 from 17 nations

Medalists
gold medal	Guo Yue	China
silver medal	Tie Ya Na	Hong Kong
bronze medal	Wang Nan	China
bronze medal	Li Jiawei	Singapore

The women's singles table tennis event was part of the table tennis programme and took place between December 2 and 7, at the Al-Arabi Indoor Hall.

== Schedule ==
All times are Arabia Standard Time (UTC+03:00)

Date	Time	Event
Saturday, 2 December 2006	10:00	Round of 64
Monday, 4 December 2006	15:00	Round of 32
Tuesday, 5 December 2006	11:00	Round of 16
Tuesday, 5 December 2006	16:30	Quarterfinals
Wednesday, 6 December 2006	15:00	Semifinals
Thursday, 7 December 2006	14:30	Final

== Results ==
=== Finals ===
Quarterfinals
1	Wang Nan (CHN)	11	11	11	12
5	Kim Kyung-ah (KOR)	7	7	6	10
7	Ai Fukuhara (JPN)	11	9	15	8	8	11	8
3	Tie Ya Na (HKG)	5	11	13	11	11	7	11
4	Li Jiawei (SIN)	11	11	12	14
10	Kwak Bang-bang (KOR)	8	7	10	12
11	Kim Mi-yong (PRK)	2	7	8	3
2	Guo Yue (CHN)	11	11	11	11

Semifinals
1	Wang Nan (CHN)	11	8	4	11	11	7	6
3	Tie Ya Na (HKG)	6	11	11	2	7	11	11
4	Li Jiawei (SIN)	7	11	10	5	7
2	Guo Yue (CHN)	11	6	12	11	11

Final
3	Tie Ya Na (HKG)	3	12	4	13	9	11	2
2	Guo Yue (CHN)	11	10	11	11	11	8	11

=== Top half ===
==== Section 1 ====
Round of 64	Round of 32						Round of 16
	1	Wang Nan (CHN)	11	11	11	11
		Ekaterina Levina (UZB)	1	2	1	8
							1	Wang Nan (CHN)	11	7	11	11	11
							9	Sun Beibei (SIN)	7	11	5	9	7
		Lara Kejebachian (LIB)	1	1	6	4
	9	Sun Beibei (SIN)	11	11	11	11

==== Section 2 ====
Round of 64	Round of 32						Round of 16
	14	Lu Yun-feng (TPE)	11	11	11	11
		Batsaikhany Batkhishig (MGL)	5	0	6	2
							14	Lu Yun-feng (TPE)	5	6	6	7
							5	Kim Kyung-ah (KOR)	11	11	11	11
		Fajir Mohammad (KUW)	2	1	1	2
	5	Kim Kyung-ah (KOR)	11	11	11	11

==== Section 3 ====
Round of 64					Round of 32							Round of 16
					7	Ai Fukuhara (JPN)	11	11	11	11
						Kalpani Herath (SRI)	6	6	3	4
												7	Ai Fukuhara (JPN)	11	11	12	10	13
Mouma Das (IND)	11	11	11	11								12	Nanthana Komwong (THA)	7	7	10	12	11
Ma Chao In (MAC)	5	4	4	7		Mouma Das (IND)	6	11	8	5	6
					12	Nanthana Komwong (THA)	11	7	11	11	11

==== Section 4 ====
Round of 64	Round of 32						Round of 16
	15	Kim Jong (PRK)	11	11	11	11
		Lương Thị Tám (VIE)	4	9	7	6
							15	Kim Jong (PRK)	13	5	6	5
							3	Tie Ya Na (HKG)	15	11	11	11
		Ekaterina Ishchenko (TJK)	1	2	1	3
	3	Tie Ya Na (HKG)	11	11	11	11

=== Bottom half ===
==== Section 5 ====
Round of 64	Round of 32						Round of 16
	4	Li Jiawei (SIN)	11	11	11	11
		Dalal Al-Hammad (KUW)	3	4	4	5
							4	Li Jiawei (SIN)	8	11	9	9	11	11	11
							16	Anisara Muangsuk (THA)	11	8	11	11	8	3	6
		Deepika Rodrigo (SRI)	9	3	5	11
	16	Anisara Muangsuk (THA)	11	11	11	13

==== Section 6 ====
Round of 64	Round of 32							Round of 16
	10	Kwak Bang-bang (KOR)	11	11	11	11
		Mai Hoàng Mỹ Trang (VIE)	7	2	8	3
								10	Kwak Bang-bang (KOR)	5	11	11	11	11
								6	Lin Ling (HKG)	11	9	6	4	8
		Poulomi Ghatak (IND)	7	6	2	12	4
	6	Lin Ling (HKG)	11	11	11	10	11

==== Section 7 ====
Round of 64	Round of 32						Round of 16
	8	Saki Kanazawa (JPN)	11	11	11	11
		Chinbatyn Nomin-Erdene (MGL)	4	1	2	1
							8	Saki Kanazawa (JPN)	11	8	6	3	11	9
							11	Kim Mi-yong (PRK)	6	11	11	11	5	11
		Mariana Sahakian (LIB)	5	4	5	3
	11	Kim Mi-yong (PRK)	11	11	11	11

==== Section 8 ====
Round of 64	Round of 32						Round of 16
	13	Huang Yi-hua (TPE)	11	11	11	11
		Chan Lai Ha (MAC)	6	4	2	4
							13	Huang Yi-hua (TPE)	11	3	6	7	6
							2	Guo Yue (CHN)	9	11	11	11	11
		Aliye Ismailova (UZB)	4	4	6	3
	2	Guo Yue (CHN)	11	11	11	11
