= Table tennis at the 2006 Asian Games – Women's doubles =

Women's doubles at the 2006 Asian Games
- Venue: Al-Arabi Indoor Hall
- Dates: 4–6 December 2006
- Competitors: 58 from 16 nations

Medalists
gold medal	Guo Yue; Li Xiaoxia	China
silver medal	Tie Ya Na; Zhang Rui	Hong Kong
bronze medal	Huang Yi-hua; Lu Yun-feng	Chinese Taipei
bronze medal	Chen Qing; Wang Nan	China

The women's doubles table tennis event was part of the table tennis programme and took place between December 4 and 6, at the Al-Arabi Indoor Hall.

== Schedule ==
All times are Arabia Standard Time (UTC+03:00)

Date	Time	Event
Monday, 4 December 2006	10:00	Round of 32
Monday, 4 December 2006	18:00	Round of 16
Tuesday, 5 December 2006	15:00	Quarterfinals
Wednesday, 6 December 2006	11:00	Semifinals
Wednesday, 6 December 2006	19:00	Final

== Results ==
=== Finals ===
Semifinals								Final
1	Guo Yue (CHN); Li Xiaoxia (CHN)	11	11	11	10	6	11
	Huang Yi-hua (TPE); Lu Yun-feng (TPE)	6	7	8	12	11	8	1	Guo Yue (CHN); Li Xiaoxia (CHN)	5	11	11	11	11
5	Chen Qing (CHN); Wang Nan (CHN)	11	5	4	4	11	9	2	Tie Ya Na (HKG); Zhang Rui (HKG)	11	6	8	8	8
2	Tie Ya Na (HKG); Zhang Rui (HKG)	5	11	11	11	6	11

=== Top half ===
==== Section 1 ====
Round of 32
Lee Eun-hee (KOR); Kwak Bang-bang (KOR)	11	11	11
Fajir Mohammad (KUW); Dalal Al-Hammad (KUW)	1	6	4
Mai Hoàng Mỹ Trang (VIE); Phạm Thị Thiên Kim (VIE)	8	12	11	5	6
Aliye Ismailova (UZB); Ekaterina Levina (UZB)	11	10	6	11	11
Ma Chao In (MAC); Wong Iok Sim (MAC)	7	4	3
6	Li Jiawei (SIN); Sun Beibei (SIN)	11	11	11

Round of 16
1	Guo Yue (CHN); Li Xiaoxia (CHN)	11	11	8	11
Lee Eun-hee (KOR); Kwak Bang-bang (KOR)	5	9	11	7
Aliye Ismailova (UZB); Ekaterina Levina (UZB)	6	2	1
6	Li Jiawei (SIN); Sun Beibei (SIN)	11	11	11

Quarterfinals
1	Guo Yue (CHN); Li Xiaoxia (CHN)	11	11	11
6	Li Jiawei (SIN); Sun Beibei (SIN)	6	7	4

==== Section 2 ====
Round of 32
8	Hiroko Fujii (JPN); Saki Kanazawa (JPN)	11	10	8	13	3
Kim Jong (PRK); Kim Mi-yong (PRK)	7	12	11	11	11
Huang Yi-hua (TPE); Lu Yun-feng (TPE)	11	11	11
Nanthana Komwong (THA); Anisara Muangsuk (THA)	3	8	7
Mouma Das (IND); Poulomi Ghatak (IND)	11	11	12	11
Lara Kejebachian (LIB); Mariana Sahakian (LIB)	7	6	14	5
Kalpani Herath (SRI); Deepika Rodrigo (SRI)	3	5	5
4	Lau Sui Fei (HKG); Lin Ling (HKG)	11	11	11

Round of 16
Kim Jong (PRK); Kim Mi-yong (PRK)	11	3	11	8	5
Huang Yi-hua (TPE); Lu Yun-feng (TPE)	8	11	7	11	11
Mouma Das (IND); Poulomi Ghatak (IND)	11	8	7	4
4	Lau Sui Fei (HKG); Lin Ling (HKG)	8	11	11	11

Quarterfinals
Huang Yi-hua (TPE); Lu Yun-feng (TPE)	7	11	16	6	13
4	Lau Sui Fei (HKG); Lin Ling (HKG)	11	4	14	11	11

=== Bottom half ===
==== Section 3 ====
Round of 32
Chan Lai Ha (MAC); Cheong Cheng I (MAC)	11	11	3	15	12
Suttilux Rattanaprayoon (THA); Tidaporn Vongboon (THA)	13	7	11	13	10
Elizabeth Barikian (LIB); Noel Kechichian (LIB)	4	2	6
Ko Un-gyong (PRK); Ryom Won-ok (PRK)	11	11	11
Tan Paey Fern (SIN); Zhang Xueling (SIN)	9	3	11	5
5	Chen Qing (CHN); Wang Nan (CHN)	11	11	9	11

Round of 16
3	Kim Kyung-ah (KOR); Park Mi-young (KOR)	11	11	11
Chan Lai Ha (MAC); Cheong Cheng I (MAC)	5	5	5
Ko Un-gyong (PRK); Ryom Won-ok (PRK)	11	9	10	5
5	Chen Qing (CHN); Wang Nan (CHN)	8	11	12	11

Quarterfinals
3	Kim Kyung-ah (KOR); Park Mi-young (KOR)	7	9	7
5	Chen Qing (CHN); Wang Nan (CHN)	11	11	11

==== Section 4 ====
Round of 32
7	Ai Fujinuma (JPN); Ai Fukuhara (JPN)	11	11	11
Kasturi Chakraborty (IND); Mousumi Paul (IND)	9	2	6
Batsaikhany Batkhishig (MGL); Chinbatyn Nomin-Erdene (MGL)	4	5	7
Lương Thị Tám (VIE); Vũ Thị Hà (VIE)	11	11	11
Maryam Sulaiman (KUW); Aminah Al-Zaidan (KUW)	6	4	1
Madina Ayubova (UZB); Nodira Burkhankhodjaeva (UZB)	11	11	11

Round of 16
7	Ai Fujinuma (JPN); Ai Fukuhara (JPN)	11	11	7	10	11
Lương Thị Tám (VIE); Vũ Thị Hà (VIE)	9	5	11	12	7
Madina Ayubova (UZB); Nodira Burkhankhodjaeva (UZB)	7	6	5
2	Tie Ya Na (HKG); Zhang Rui (HKG)	11	11	11

Quarterfinals
7	Ai Fujinuma (JPN); Ai Fukuhara (JPN)	9	11	8	11	10
2	Tie Ya Na (HKG); Zhang Rui (HKG)	11	6	11	9	12
