= Table tennis at the 2002 Asian Games – Women's doubles =

Women's doubles at the 2002 Asian Games
- Venue: Dongchun Gymnasium
- Dates: 7–8 October 2002
- Competitors: 42 from 13 nations

Medalists
gold medal	Lee Eun-sil; Seok Eun-mi	South Korea
silver medal	Zhang Yining; Li Nan	China
bronze medal	Ryu Ji-hye; Kim Moo-kyo	South Korea
bronze medal	Wang Nan; Guo Yan	China

The women's doubles table tennis event was part of the table tennis programme and took place between October 7 and 8, at the Dongchun Gymnasium, Ulsan.

== Schedule ==
All times are Korea Standard Time (UTC+09:00)

Date	Time	Event
Monday, 7 October 2002	11:00	1st round
Monday, 7 October 2002	11:45	2nd round
Monday, 7 October 2002	14:00	Quarterfinals
Monday, 7 October 2002	15:30	Semifinals
Tuesday, 8 October 2002	11:00	Final

== Results ==
=== Finals ===
Semifinals								Final
1	Zhang Yining (CHN); Li Nan (CHN)	11	11	8	11	11
4	Ryu Ji-hye (KOR); Kim Moo-kyo (KOR)	7	6	11	8	8		1	Zhang Yining (CHN); Li Nan (CHN)	11	11	8	11	8	9	10
8	Lee Eun-sil (KOR); Seok Eun-mi (KOR)	8	11	10	11	11	11	8	Lee Eun-sil (KOR); Seok Eun-mi (KOR)	9	8	11	7	11	11	12
2	Wang Nan (CHN); Guo Yan (CHN)	11	8	12	9	8	4

=== Top half ===
==== Section 1 ====
1st round				2nd round						Quarterfinals
				1	Zhang Yining (CHN); Li Nan (CHN)	11	6	11	11
Möngöntsetsegiin Batjargal (MGL); Batsaikhany Batkhishig (MGL)	2	3	3		Lau Sui Fei (HKG); Kwok Fong Fong (HKG)	5	11	9	5
Lau Sui Fei (HKG); Kwok Fong Fong (HKG)	11	11	11							1	Zhang Yining (CHN); Li Nan (CHN)	11	11	12
										7	Aya Umemura (JPN); Satoko Kishida (JPN)	3	7	10
					Ghazala Rohi (PAK); Shabnam Bilal (PAK)	5	3	5
				7	Aya Umemura (JPN); Satoko Kishida (JPN)	11	11	11

==== Section 2 ====
1st round	2nd round							Quarterfinals
	6	Kim Hyon-hui (PRK); Kim Hyang-mi (PRK)	6	11	11	11	11
		Pan Li-chun (TPE); Su Hsien-ching (TPE)	11	6	13	7	5
								6	Kim Hyon-hui (PRK); Kim Hyang-mi (PRK)	9	13	11	8	8
								4	Ryu Ji-hye (KOR); Kim Moo-kyo (KOR)	11	11	7	11	11
		Zhang Xueling (SIN); Tan Paey Fern (SIN)	5	6	3
	4	Ryu Ji-hye (KOR); Kim Moo-kyo (KOR)	11	11	11

=== Bottom half ===
==== Section 3 ====
1st round	2nd round					Quarterfinals
	3	Li Jiawei (SIN); Jing Junhong (SIN)	11	11	11
		Saida Burkhankhodjaeva (UZB); Manzura Inoyatova (UZB)	3	6	2
						3	Li Jiawei (SIN); Jing Junhong (SIN)	7	11	11	8
						8	Lee Eun-sil (KOR); Seok Eun-mi (KOR)	11	13	4	11
		Lu Yun-feng (TPE); Huang Yi-hua (TPE)	7	8	3
	8	Lee Eun-sil (KOR); Seok Eun-mi (KOR)	11	11	11

==== Section 4 ====
1st round	2nd round					Quarterfinals
	5	Tie Ya Na (HKG); Song Ah Sim (HKG)	5	4	8
		Kim Mi-yong (PRK); Kim Yun-mi (PRK)	11	11	11
							Kim Mi-yong (PRK); Kim Yun-mi (PRK)	5	11	5	6
						2	Wang Nan (CHN); Guo Yan (CHN)	11	8	11	11
		An Konishi (JPN); Ai Fukuhara (JPN)	10	5	7
	2	Wang Nan (CHN); Guo Yan (CHN)	12	11	11
