= 2007 World Table Tennis Championships – Mixed doubles =

Mixed doubles at the 2007 World Table Tennis Championships
- Venue: Dom Sportova
- Location: Zagreb, Croatia
- Final score: 13–11, 11–7, 8–11, 11–9, 9–11, 12–10

Medalists
gold medal	Wang Liqin; Guo Yue	China
silver medal	Ma Lin; Wang Nan	China
bronze medal	Qiu Yike; Cao Zhen	China
bronze medal	Ko Lai Chak; Tie Ya Na	Hong Kong

The 2007 World Table Tennis Championships mixed doubles was the 49th edition of the mixed doubles championship.

Wang Liqin and Guo Yue defeated Ma Lin and Wang Nan in the final.

== Seeds ==
1. (China) Wang Liqin / (China) Guo Yue (champions)
2. (China) Ma Lin / (China) Wang Nan (final)
3. (Hong Kong) Ko Lai Chak / (Hong Kong) Tie Ya Na (semifinals)
4. (China) Qiu Yike / (China) Cao Zhen (semifinals)
5. (South Korea) Lee Jung-woo / (South Korea) Lee Eun-hee (third round)
6. (Austria) Werner Schlager / (Austria) Liu Jia (third round)
7. (South Korea) Joo Sae-hyuk / (South Korea) Park Mi-young (quarterfinals)
8. (South Korea) Oh Sang-eun / (South Korea) Kim Jung-hyun (quarterfinals)
9. (Singapore) Gao Ning / (Singapore) Li Jiawei (first round)
10. (Hong Kong) Cheung Yuk / (Hong Kong) Zhang Rui (third round)
11. (Hong Kong) Leung Chu Yan / (Hong Kong) Lin Ling (quarterfinals)
12. (Japan) Seiya Kishikawa / (Japan) Ai Fukuhara (third round)
13. (South Korea) Lee Jung-sam / (South Korea) Moon Hyun-jung (third round)
14. (Singapore) Yang Zi / (Singapore) Wang Yuegu (fourth round)
15. (China) Xu Xin / (China) Guo Yan (fourth round)
16. (China) Lei Zhenhua / (China) Ding Ning (fourth round)
17. (Chinese Taipei) Chuang Chih-yuan / (Chinese Taipei) Huang Yi-hua (third round)
18. (Italy) Yang Min / (Italy) Wenling Tan Monfardini (third round)
19. (Netherlands) Trinko Keen / (Netherlands) Li Jiao (third round)
20. (Japan) Yo Kan / (Japan) Ai Fujinuma (third round)
21. (Germany) Christian Süß / (Germany) Elke Schall (third round)
22. (China) Zhang Chao / (China) Chen Qing (fourth round)
23. (Hong Kong) Tang Peng / (Hong Kong) Jiang Huajun (quarterfinals)
24. (Hungary) Ferenc Pazsy / (Hungary) Georgina Póta (first round)
25. (Romania) Adrian Crișan / (Romania) Daniela Dodean (second round)
26. (Japan) Jun Mizutani / (Japan) Haruna Fukuoka (third round)
27. (Czech Republic) Petr Korbel / (Czech Republic) Renáta Štrbíková (first round)
28. (Serbia) Aleksandar Karakašević / (Serbia) Gabriela Feher (fourth round)
29. (France) Patrick Chila / (France) Carole Grundisch (third round)
30. (Chinese Taipei) Chiang Peng-lung / (Chinese Taipei) Lu Yun-feng (third round)
31. (Japan) Taku Takakiwa / (Japan) Sayaka Hirano (second round)
32. (France) Christophe Legoût / (France) Laurie Phai Pang (second round)

== Finals ==
Quarterfinals
1	(China) Wang Liqin (China) Guo Yue	11	11	11	12
8	(South Korea) Oh Sang-Eun (South Korea) Kim Jung-hyun	8	6	7	10
23	(Hong Kong) Tang Peng (Hong Kong) Jiang Huajun	6	2	10	11	3
4	(China) Qiu Yike (China) Cao Zhen	11	11	12	6	11
3	(Hong Kong) Ko Lai Chak (Hong Kong) Tie Ya Na	11	11	11	11
11	(Hong Kong) Leung Chu Yan (Hong Kong) Lin Ling	5	6	8	4
7	(South Korea) Joo Sae-hyuk (South Korea) Park Mi-young	11	6	6	4	12	5
2	(China) Ma Lin (China) Wang Nan	7	11	11	11	10	11

Semifinals
1	(China) Wang Liqin (China) Guo Yue	9	11	11	11	11
4	(China) Qiu Yike (China) Cao Zhen	11	8	3	6	3
3	(Hong Kong) Ko Lai Chak (Hong Kong) Tie Ya Na	10	6	8	4
2	(China) Ma Lin (China) Wang Nan	12	11	11	11

Final
1	(China) Wang Liqin (China) Guo Yue	13	11	8	11	9	12
2	(China) Ma Lin (China) Wang Nan	11	7	11	9	11	10

== Main draw ==
=== Top half ===
==== Section 1 ====
First round
1	(China) Wang L (China) Guo Y	11	11	11	11
(Belarus) V Nekhvedovich (Belarus) V Pavlovich	6	2	4	8
(Brazil) T Monteiro (Brazil) L Silva	11	5	10	11	4	8
(Chinese Taipei) Chang Y-S (Chinese Taipei) Pan L-C	6	11	12	7	11	11
(South Korea) Kim J-H (South Korea) Cho H-L	11	11	8	7	11	11	11
(Czech Republic) L Jancarik (Czech Republic) L Harabaszova	9	8	11	11	9	13	8
(Brazil) G Tsuboi (Brazil) K Sako	5	5	15	11	11	5	11
27	(Czech Republic) P Korbel (Czech Republic) R Strbikova	11	11	13	6	8	11	6
32	(France) C Legout (France) L Phai Pang	11	11	11	3	11
(New Zealand) R Zhu (New Zealand) Y Sun	6	8	4	11	3
(Thailand) P Sanguansin (Thailand) A Muangsuk	11	9	11	5	7	8
(Hungary) J Jakab (Hungary) K Tóth	9	11	9	11	11	11
(Ukraine) O Didukh (Ukraine) T Sorochynska	4	11	17	11	11
(United States) E Owens (United States) C Wang	11	2	15	7	3
(Czech Republic) T Konecny (Czech Republic) I Weberova	11	7	7	10	4
10	(Hong Kong) Cheung Y (Hong Kong) Zhang R	6	11	11	12	11

Second round
1	(China) Wang L (China) Guo Y	11	11	11	11
(Chinese Taipei) Chang Y-S (Chinese Taipei) Pan L-C	4	8	4	6
(South Korea) Kim J-H (South Korea) Cho H-L	8	11	11	11	11
(Brazil) G Tsuboi (Brazil) K Sako	11	2	4	9	8
32	(France) C Legout (France) L Phai Pang	6	8	13	10	11	4
(Hungary) J Jakab (Hungary) K Tóth	11	11	11	12	5	11
(Ukraine) O Didukh (Ukraine) T Sorochynska	9	6	6	11	15	11	6
10	(Hong Kong) Cheung Y (Hong Kong) Zhang R	11	11	11	9	13	9	11

Third round
1	(China) Wang L (China) Guo Y	11	11	11	11
(South Korea) Kim J-H (South Korea) Cho H-L	5	4	4	9
(Hungary) J Jakab (Hungary) K Tóth	4	8	11	7	10
10	(Hong Kong) Cheung Y (Hong Kong) Zhang R	11	11	6	11	12

Fourth round
1	(China) Wang L (China) Guo Y	11	11	11	11
10	(Hong Kong) Cheung Y (Hong Kong) Zhang R	4	6	8	9

==== Section 2 ====
First round
13	(South Korea) Lee J-S (South Korea) Moon H-J	12	12	11	3	11
(Malaysia) Chai K B (Malaysia) Chiu S J	10	10	7	11	9
(Sweden) J Persson (Sweden) M Pettersson	14	6	11	5	9	1
(Hungary) P Fazekas (Hungary) P Lovas	12	11	8	11	11	11
(Sweden) F Håkansson (Sweden) M Ekholm	8	11	11	11	11
(England) D Knight (England) K Sibley	11	7	8	6	9
(Austria) D Habesohn (Austria) M Petzner	11	6	10	4	11	7
28	(Serbia) A Karakašević (Serbia) G Feher	6	11	12	11	8	11
19	(Netherlands) T Keen (Netherlands) J Li	11	11	11	11
(South Africa) S Overmeyer (South Africa) S Maal	7	4	3	4
(Egypt) E-S Lashin (Egypt) S Abdul-Aziz	13	6	5	9
(Slovenia) B Tokič (Slovenia) M Pohar	15	11	11	11
(Greece) P Gionis (Greece) M Mirou	11	6	7	11	11	11
(Belarus) A Kuchuk (Belarus) A Privalova	9	11	11	9	9	3
(Spain) J Cantero (Spain) C Solichero	5	5	7	4
8	(South Korea) Oh S-E (South Korea) Kim J-H	11	11	11	11

Second round
13	(South Korea) Lee J-S (South Korea) Moon H-J	10	9	11	12	10	11	11
(Hungary) P Fazekas (Hungary) P Lovas	12	11	11	10	12	6	9
(Sweden) F Håkansson (Sweden) M Ekholm	13	11	9	11	7	6
28	(Serbia) A Karakašević (Serbia) G Feher	15	9	11	9	11	11
19	(Netherlands) T Keen (Netherlands) J Li	9	11	14	11	11
(Slovenia) B Tokič (Slovenia) M Pohar	11	7	12	2	9
(Greece) P Gionis (Greece) M Mirou	9	11	7	8	3
8	(South Korea) Oh S-E (South Korea) Kim J-H	11	9	11	11	11

Third round
13	(South Korea) Lee J-S (South Korea) Moon H-J	7	4	11	6	11	6
28	(Serbia) A Karakašević (Serbia) G Feher	11	11	9	11	7	11
19	(Netherlands) T Keen (Netherlands) J Li	6	8	11	6	11	8
8	(South Korea) Oh S-E (South Korea) Kim J-H	11	11	8	11	6	11

Fourth round
28	(Serbia) A Karakašević (Serbia) G Feher	9	6	5	11	11	6
8	(South Korea) Oh S-E (South Korea) Kim J-H	11	11	11	9	3	11

==== Section 3 ====
First round
6	(Austria) W Schlager (Austria) J Liu	11	12	11	11
(Thailand) P Sanguansin (Thailand) N Komwong	8	10	3	5
(Serbia) B Milošević (Serbia) A Erdelji	9	10	10	11	11	11	11
(Poland) D Gorak (Poland) N Partyka	11	12	12	8	6	6	7
(Czech Republic) A Gavlas (Czech Republic) I Vacenovska	8	11	12	6	7	9
(Hungary) D Zwickl (Hungary) S Pergel	11	5	10	11	11	11
(Slovakia) Z Lelkes (Slovakia) V Lucenkova	3	7	8	4
23	(Hong Kong) Tang P (Hong Kong) Jiang H	11	11	11	11
18	(Italy) M Yang (Italy) W Tan	11	11	11	11
(Slovakia) T Keinath (Slovakia) J Medrikova	6	9	7	7
(Spain) V Sanchez (Spain) S Ramirez	9	11	5	11	5	8
(Chinese Taipei) Chiang H-C (Chinese Taipei) Cheng I-C	11	5	11	9	11	11
(South Korea) Cho E-R (South Korea) Shim S-R	11	10	11	7	11	11
(Brazil) H Hoyama (Brazil) M Nonaka	6	12	6	11	4	9
(Greece) K Papageorgiou (Greece) E Ntoulaki	4	11	7	11	11	11
9	(Singapore) Gao N (Singapore) Li J	11	4	11	7	8	8

Second round
6	(Austria) W Schlager (Austria) J Liu	11	11	5	11	11
(Serbia) B Milošević (Serbia) A Erdelji	2	4	11	5	2
(Hungary) D Zwickl (Hungary) S Pergel	9	6	8	11	11	6
23	(Hong Kong) Tang P (Hong Kong) Jiang H	11	11	11	9	8	11
18	(Italy) M Yang (Italy) W Tan	11	11	11	10	11	9	11
(Chinese Taipei) Chiang H-C (Chinese Taipei) Cheng I-C	9	13	5	12	2	11	9
(South Korea) Cho E-R (South Korea) Shim S-R	11	13	6	11	10	11	11
(Greece) K Papageorgiou (Greece) E Ntoulaki	13	11	11	3	12	5	6

Third round
6	(Austria) W Schlager (Austria) J Liu	7	11	7	12	4	8
23	(Hong Kong) Tang P (Hong Kong) Jiang H	11	8	11	10	11	11
18	(Italy) M Yang (Italy) W Tan
(South Korea) Cho E-R (South Korea) Shim S-R	w/o

Fourth round
23	(Hong Kong) Tang P (Hong Kong) Jiang H	11	11	11	7	11	11
(South Korea) Cho E-R (South Korea) Shim S-R	7	3	13	11	7	4

==== Section 4 ====
First round
15	(China) Xu X (China) Guo Y	11	11	11	11	11
(India) Achanta S K (India) P Ghatak	9	13	5	4	6
(Spain) A Carneros (Spain) G Dvorak	11	8	4	12	6	11	11
(Poland) Z Y Wang (Poland) J Xu	7	11	11	10	11	7	8
(Dominican Republic) J Lin (Dominican Republic) X Wu	11	10	5	7	11	8
(Netherlands) D Heister (Netherlands) L Creemers	7	12	11	11	5	11
(Egypt) A A Saleh (Egypt) B Osman	8	11	5	4	9
20	(Japan) Y Kan (Japan) A Fujinuma	11	8	11	11	11
31	(Japan) T Takakiwa (Japan) S Hirano	9	11	6	11	9	11	11
(United States) M Hazinski (United States) C X Huang	11	7	11	4	11	3	7
(Nigeria) Q Aruna (Nigeria) B Kaffo	3	6	7	1
(Singapore) Cai X (Singapore) Sun B	11	11	11	11
(Austria) B Presslmayer (Austria) Q Li	11	11	11	9	11
(India) A Nandi (India) K Chakraborty	3	9	4	11	8
(France) E Lebesson (Cameroon) S Hanffou	5	6	5	10
4	(China) Qiu Y (China) Cao Z	11	11	11	12

Second round
15	(China) Xu X (China) Guo Y	11	11	11	6	11
(Spain) A Carneros (Spain) G Dvorak	5	7	4	11	5
(Netherlands) D Heister (Netherlands) L Creemers	8	11	8	11	7
20	(Japan) Y Kan (Japan) A Fujinuma	11	13	11	7	11
31	(Japan) T Takakiwa (Japan) S Hirano	11	4	4	4	6
(Singapore) Cai X (Singapore) Sun B	7	11	11	11	11
(Austria) B Presslmayer (Austria) Q Li	4	8	7	5
4	(China) Qiu Y (China) Cao Z	11	11	11	11

Third round
15	(China) Xu X (China) Guo Y	11	7	11	8	11	5	11
20	(Japan) Y Kan (Japan) A Fujinuma	8	11	8	11	6	11	9
(Singapore) Cai X (Singapore) Sun B	6	2	9	10
4	(China) Qiu Y (China) Cao Z	11	11	11	12

Fourth round
15	(China) Xu X (China) Guo Y	11	14	9	11	7	9	8
4	(China) Qiu Y (China) Cao Z	4	12	11	9	11	11	11

=== Bottom half ===
==== Section 5 ====
First round
3	(Hong Kong) Ko L C (Hong Kong) Tie Y N	11	11	11	11
(Israel) Y Sharon (Israel) D Saporta	4	5	2	7
(Slovenia) S Lasan (Slovenia) J Tomazini	11	4	12	13	4	10
(Spain) M Duran (Spain) F Zhu	5	11	14	11	11	12
(United States) H Xiao (United States) J Gao	11	11	12	11
(Bulgaria) G Grozdanov (Bulgaria) K Gatinska	9	6	10	9
(India) S Roy (India) M Das	4	8	8	8
30	(Chinese Taipei) Chiang P-L (Chinese Taipei) Lu Y-F	11	11	11	11
24	(Hungary) F Pazsy (Hungary) G Póta	11	7	8	11	7	9
(Japan) K Matsudaira (Japan) K Ishikawa	7	11	11	9	11	11
(Austria) B Kovac (Croatia) M Durak	7	1	7	9
(Russia) I Rubtsov (Russia) S Ganina	11	11	11	11
(Russia) F Kuzmin (Russia) A Tikhomirova	10	6	9	11	8
(Ukraine) Y Pryshchepa (Ukraine) M Pesotska	12	11	11	8	11
(Croatia) T Kolarek (Croatia) S Paukovic	6	11	3	9	8
14	(Singapore) Yang Z (Singapore) Wang Y	11	9	11	11	11

Second round
3	(Hong Kong) Ko L C (Hong Kong) Tie Y N	11	11	11	9	11
(Spain) M Duran (Spain) F Zhu	4	7	2	11	3
(United States) H Xiao (United States) J Gao	15	9	7	4	12	4
30	(Chinese Taipei) Chiang P-L (Chinese Taipei) Lu Y-F	13	11	11	11	10	11
(Japan) K Matsudaira (Japan) K Ishikawa	7	3	11	11	8	10
(Russia) I Rubtsov (Russia) S Ganina	11	11	6	3	11	12
(Ukraine) Y Pryshchepa (Ukraine) M Pesotska	7	4	8	6
14	(Singapore) Yang Z (Singapore) Wang Y	11	11	11	11

Third round
3	(Hong Kong) Ko L C (Hong Kong) Tie Y N	11	11	11	11
30	(Chinese Taipei) Chiang P-L (Chinese Taipei) Lu Y-F	8	6	6	8
(Russia) I Rubtsov (Russia) S Ganina	11	10	9	5	1
14	(Singapore) Yang Z (Singapore) Wang Y	8	12	11	11	11

Fourth round
3	(Hong Kong) Ko L C (Hong Kong) Tie Y N	11	11	9	11	11
14	(Singapore) Yang Z (Singapore) Wang Y	9	5	11	8	8

==== Section 6 ====
First round
11	(Hong Kong) Leung C Y (Hong Kong) Lin L	11	11	11	5	11
(Sweden) R Svensson (Sweden) C Jonsson	7	8	6	11	8
(Russia) K Skachkov (Russia) Y Prokhorova	9	11	11	11	11
(Romania) A Filimon (Romania) E Samara	11	9	5	8	9
(Russia) A Smirnov (Russia) A Voronova	11	11	11	11
(Portugal) J Monteiro (Portugal) P S Goncalves	6	9	8	1
(Slovenia) M Horvat (Slovenia) B Todorovic	5	5	3	11	8
29	(France) P Chila (France) C Grundisch	11	11	11	7	11
22	(China) Zhang C (China) Chen Q	11	11	7	11	11
(Italy) S Tomasi (Italy) Y Wang	3	7	11	2	3
(Poland) J Kosowski (Poland) N Bak	3	5	6	16	12	12	6
(North Korea) Ri C-G (North Korea) Ko U-G	11	11	11	14	10	10	11
(Italy) M Bobocica (Italy) N Stefanova	11	4	12	11	11	11
(Hong Kong) Tse K C (Hong Kong) Yu K S	8	11	14	3	7	3
(Romania) L Filimon (Romania) I Necula	7	2	8	8
5	(South Korea) Lee J-W (South Korea) Lee E-H	11	11	11	11

Second round
11	(Hong Kong) Leung C Y (Hong Kong) Lin L	11	9	11	5	11	6	11
(Russia) K Skachkov (Russia) Y Prokhorova	8	11	8	11	6	11	7
(Russia) A Smirnov (Russia) A Voronova	1	10	9	5
29	(France) P Chila (France) C Grundisch	11	12	11	11
22	(China) Zhang C (China) Chen Q	11	11	8	11	11
(North Korea) Ri C-G (North Korea) Ko U-G	7	8	11	5	7
(Italy) M Bobocica (Italy) N Stefanova	5	4	9	8
5	(South Korea) Lee J-W (South Korea) Lee E-H	11	11	11	11

Third round
11	(Hong Kong) Leung C Y (Hong Kong) Lin L	6	11	11	12	11
29	(France) P Chila (France) C Grundisch	11	3	5	10	3
22	(China) Zhang C (China) Chen Q	11	11	8	11	11
5	(South Korea) Lee J-W (South Korea) Lee E-H	6	4	11	7	8

Fourth round
11	(Hong Kong) Leung C Y (Hong Kong) Lin L	11	11	12	7	5	11
22	(China) Zhang C (China) Chen Q	6	7	10	11	11	7

==== Section 7 ====
First round
7	(South Korea) Joo S-H (South Korea) Park M-Y	11	11	11	11
(Czech Republic) J Kleprlik (Czech Republic) K Penkavova	4	6	6	4
(Russia) G Vlasov (Russia) I Kotikhina	9	11	3	9	10
(Italy) V Piacentini (Italy) L Negrisoli	11	3	11	11	12
(China) Zhang J (China) Yao Y	11	11	11	11
(Bosnia and Herzegovina) V Ivanek (Bosnia and Herzegovina) M Antonic	4	4	5	7
(Nigeria) S Toriola (Nigeria) O Oshonaike	8	6	15	8
21	(Germany) C Süß (Germany) E Schall	11	11	17	11
17	(Chinese Taipei) Chuang C-Y (Chinese Taipei) Huang Y-H	2	11	3	8	7
(Slovakia) E Illas (Slovakia) L Kmotorkova	11	9	11	11	11
(Croatia) R Redjep (Croatia) I Knežević	14	11	5	11	3	11
(Austria) R Gardos (Austria) V Heine	12	5	11	9	11	6
(Germany) P Baum (Germany) J Wu	11	11	11	12
(Lithuania) K Zeimys (Lithuania) I Kardauskaite	8	4	8	10
(Bulgaria) K Popov (Bulgaria) A Kasabova	5	7	5	4
16	(China) Lei Z (China) Ding N	11	11	11	11

Second round
7	(South Korea) Joo S-H (South Korea) Park M-Y	11	11	11	11
(Italy) V Piacentini (Italy) L Negrisoli	6	7	9	9
(China) Zhang J (China) Yao Y	11	11	11	7	7	10
21	(Germany) C Süß (Germany) E Schall	8	13	4	11	11	12
17	(Chinese Taipei) Chuang C-Y (Chinese Taipei) Huang Y-H	11	11	11	11
(Croatia) R Redjep (Croatia) I Knežević	3	7	9	7
(Germany) P Baum (Germany) J Wu	6	3	4	11	3
16	(China) Lei Z (China) Ding N	11	11	11	7	11

Third round
7	(South Korea) Joo S-H (South Korea) Park M-Y	9	11	11	11	6	11
21	(Germany) C Süß (Germany) E Schall	11	4	9	6	11	7
17	(Chinese Taipei) Chuang C-Y (Chinese Taipei) Huang Y-H	10	7	4	11	10
16	(China) Lei Z (China) Ding N	12	11	11	8	12

Fourth round
7	(South Korea) Joo S-H (South Korea) Park M-Y	8	10	11	11	7	11	12
16	(China) Lei Z (China) Ding N	11	12	4	5	11	6	10

==== Section 8 ====
First round
12	(Japan) S Kishikawa (Japan) A Fukuhara	11	11	9	3	11	9	11
(Slovakia) P Sereda (Slovakia) B Balazova	8	7	11	11	5	11	6
(Serbia) Ž Pete (Serbia) E Tapai	8	12	14	12	8	9
(Germany) D Ovtcharov (Germany) Z Barthel	11	14	12	10	11	11
(North Korea) Kim H-B (North Korea) Kim J	14	11	11	11	11
(Chinese Taipei) Wu C-C (Chinese Taipei) Lee I-C	12	13	8	6	8
(Ukraine) I Katkov (Ukraine) T Tkachova	11	6	9	11	12	21	3
25	(Romania) A Crişan (Romania) D Dodean	6	11	11	8	14	19	11
26	(Japan) J Mizutani (Japan) H Fukuoka	11	7	11	11	11
(Netherlands) B Wijers (Netherlands) C Nouwen	1	11	7	5	6
(Poland) B Such (Poland) M Golota	9	11	7	11	11	11
(Germany) B Steger (Germany) K Silbereisen	11	9	11	8	8	2
(Australia) W Henzell (Australia) M Miao	11	10	13	12	13
(India) S Saha (India) S Kumaresan	8	12	11	10	11
(Portugal) T Apolonia (Portugal) A Neves	3	3	1	2
2	(China) Ma Lin (China) Wang Nan	11	11	11	11

Second round
12	(Japan) S Kishikawa (Japan) A Fukuhara	9	11	11	10	11	11
(Germany) D Ovtcharov (Germany) Z Barthel	11	9	7	12	7	8
(North Korea) Kim H-B (North Korea) Kim J	11	11	11	7	11	11
25	(Romania) A Crişan (Romania) D Dodean	8	6	9	11	13	8
26	(Japan) J Mizutani (Japan) H Fukuoka	11	11	11	11
(Poland) B Such (Poland) M Golota	9	8	9	4
(Australia) W Henzell (Australia) M Miao	8	6	10	7
2	(China) Ma Lin (China) Wang Nan	11	11	12	11

Third round
12	(Japan) S Kishikawa (Japan) A Fukuhara	9	4	11	11	11	7
(North Korea) Kim H-B (North Korea) Kim J	11	11	13	9	7	11
26	(Japan) J Mizutani (Japan) H Fukuoka	11	9	12	5	8	11	7
2	(China) Ma Lin (China) Wang Nan	2	11	10	11	11	9	11

Fourth round
(North Korea) Kim H-B (North Korea) Kim J	9	10	6	5
2	(China) Ma Lin (China) Wang Nan	11	12	11	11
