= Table tennis at the 2002 Asian Games – Women's team =

Women's team at the 2002 Asian Games
- Venue: Dongchun Gymnasium
- Dates: 1–4 October 2002
- Competitors: 45 from 10 nations

Medalists
gold medal	North Korea; Kim Hyang-mi, Kim Hyon-hui, Kim Mi-yong, Kim Yun-mi, Ryom Won-ok
silver medal	China; Guo Yan, Li Nan, Niu Jianfeng, Wang Nan, Zhang Yining
bronze medal	Singapore; Jing Junhong, Li Jiawei, Tan Paey Fern, Zhang Xueling
bronze medal	Japan; Ai Fukuhara, Satoko Kishida, An Konishi, Mikie Takahashi, Aya Umemura

The women's team table tennis event was part of the table tennis programme and took place between October 1 and 4, at the Dongchun Gymnasium, Ulsan.

== Schedule ==
All times are Korea Standard Time (UTC+09:00)

Date	Time	Event
Tuesday, 1 October 2002	14:00	Preliminary round 1
Tuesday, 1 October 2002	17:00	Preliminary round 2
Wednesday, 2 October 2002	14:00	Preliminary round 3
Wednesday, 2 October 2002	17:00	Preliminary round 4
Thursday, 3 October 2002	14:00	Preliminary round 5
Thursday, 3 October 2002	17:00	Quarterfinals
Friday, 4 October 2002	14:00	Semifinals
Friday, 4 October 2002	17:30	Final

== Results ==
=== Preliminary round ===
==== Group A ====
Pos	Team	Pld	W	L	MF	MA	Pts	Qualification
1	China	4	4	0	12	0	8	Quarterfinals
2	Singapore	4	3	1	9	4	7	Quarterfinals
3	Hong Kong	4	2	2	7	7	6	Quarterfinals
4	South Korea	4	1	3	4	9	5	Quarterfinals
5	Pakistan	4	0	4	0	12	4	

Source: Report

1 October	South Korea	3–0	Pakistan

Ryu Ji-hye	3–0	Ghazala Rohi	11–3, 11–4, 11–4
Seok Eun-mi	3–0	Shabnam Bilal	11–6, 12–10, 13–11
Han Kwang-sun	3–0	Raheela Kashif	11–1, 11–2, 11–4

1 October	Hong Kong	1–3	Singapore

Tie Ya Na	2–3	Jing Junhong	7–11, 11–4, 11–5, 6–11, 8–11
Song Ah Sim	2–3	Li Jiawei	10–12, 14–12, 5–11, 11–9, 4–11
Lau Sui Fei	3–2	Zhang Xueling	12–14, 9–11, 11–4, 11–8, 11–7
Tie Ya Na	1–3	Li Jiawei	11–9, 5–11, 4–11, 13–15

1 October	China	3–0	Pakistan

Zhang Yining	3–0	Ghazala Rohi	11–3, 11–2, 11–6
Wang Nan	3–0	Shabnam Bilal	11–3, 11–1, 11–6
Guo Yan	3–0	Raheela Kashif	11–1, 11–2, 11–4

1 October	South Korea	1–3	Hong Kong

Kim Moo-kyo	2–3	Tie Ya Na	9–11, 11–7, 9–11, 11–9, 5–11
Ryu Ji-hye	2–3	Lau Sui Fei	2–11, 5–11, 11–7, 12–10, 9–11
Lee Eun-sil	3–0	Song Ah Sim	11–9, 11–7, 11–3
Ryu Ji-hye	0–3	Tie Ya Na	6–11, 7–11, 7–11

2 October	China	3–0	Singapore

Zhang Yining	3–0	Jing Junhong	11–3, 11–4, 11–4
Wang Nan	3–2	Li Jiawei	7–11, 11–8, 11–6, 8–11, 11–8
Li Nan	3–0	Tan Paey Fern	11–8, 11–6, 11–3

2 October	Pakistan	0–3	Hong Kong

Ghazala Rohi	0–3	Lau Sui Fei	5–11, 7–11, 4–11
Shabnam Bilal	0–3	Tie Ya Na	4–11, 7–11, 3–11
Raheela Kashif	0–3	Kwok Fong Fong	2–11, 2–11, 2–11

2 October	China	3–0	Hong Kong

Wang Nan	3–0	Lau Sui Fei	11–5, 11–8, 11–6
Zhang Yining	3–2	Song Ah Sim	9–11, 9–11, 11–8, 11–6, 11–9
Niu Jianfeng	3–0	Kwok Fong Fong	11–3, 14–12, 11–2

2 October	Singapore	3–0	South Korea

Li Jiawei	3–2	Lee Eun-sil	2–11, 11–9, 10–12, 12–10, 14–12
Jing Junhong	3–2	Kim Moo-kyo	11–6, 7–11, 5–11, 12–10, 11–8
Zhang Xueling	3–1	Ryu Ji-hye	5–11, 11–4, 11–4, 11–8

3 October	China	3–0	South Korea

Niu Jianfeng	3–2	Ryu Ji-hye	7–11, 13–11, 6–11, 11–9, 11–5
Li Nan	3–1	Lee Eun-sil	11–7, 11–8, 6–11, 11–6
Guo Yan	3–0	Kim Moo-kyo	11–9, 11–8, 11–8

3 October	Singapore	3–0	Pakistan

Jing Junhong	3–0	Ghazala Rohi	11–4, 11–2, 11–5
Zhang Xueling	3–0	Shabnam Bilal	11–5, 11–4, 11–4
Tan Paey Fern	3–1	Raheela Kashif	7–11, 11–3, 11–4, 11–4

==== Group B ====
Pos	Team	Pld	W	L	MF	MA	Pts	Qualification
1	Japan	4	4	0	12	2	8	Quarterfinals
2	North Korea	4	3	1	10	3	7	Quarterfinals
3	Chinese Taipei	4	2	2	7	6	6	Quarterfinals
4	Uzbekistan	4	1	3	3	9	5	Quarterfinals
5	Mongolia	4	0	4	0	12	4	

Source: Report

1 October	Chinese Taipei	3–0	Mongolia

Huang Yi-hua	3–0	Möngöntsetsegiin Batjargal	11–5, 11–3, 11–2
Lu Yun-feng	3–0	Batsaikhany Batkhishig	11–1, 11–5, 11–2
Pan Li-chun	3–0	Tsegmidyn Zolzayaa	Walkover

1 October	Japan	3–0	Uzbekistan

Aya Umemura	3–0	Manzura Inoyatova	11–2, 11–9, 11–2
An Konishi	3–0	Saida Burkhankhodjaeva	11–6, 11–7, 11–8
Ai Fukuhara	3–0	Madina Ayubova	11–1, 11–4, 11–2

1 October	North Korea	3–0	Mongolia

Kim Hyon-hui	3–0	Batsaikhany Batkhishig	11–3, 11–1, 11–1
Kim Hyang-mi	3–0	Möngöntsetsegiin Batjargal	11–4, 11–2, 11–2
Kim Yun-mi	3–0	Tsegmidyn Zolzayaa	Walkover

1 October	Chinese Taipei	1–3	Japan

Lu Yun-feng	3–0	Aya Umemura	12–10, 12–10, 13–11
Huang Yi-hua	0–3	An Konishi	8–11, 10–12, 8–11
Pan Li-chun	1–3	Mikie Takahashi	11–8, 5–11, 6–11, 3–11
Huang Yi-hua	0–3	Aya Umemura	4–11, 8–11, 10–12

2 October	North Korea	3–0	Uzbekistan

Kim Hyon-hui	3–0	Saida Burkhankhodjaeva	11–5, 11–7, 11–5
Kim Hyang-mi	3–0	Manzura Inoyatova	11–5, 11–4, 11–4
Kim Yun-mi	3–0	Madina Ayubova	11–4, 11–6, 11–2

2 October	Mongolia	0–3	Japan

Möngöntsetsegiin Batjargal	0–3	Ai Fukuhara	4–11, 3–11, 2–11
Batsaikhany Batkhishig	0–3	Satoko Kishida	4–11, 0–11, 0–11
Tsegmidyn Zolzayaa	0–3	Mikie Takahashi	Walkover

2 October	North Korea	1–3	Japan

Kim Hyon-hui	1–3	An Konishi	7–11, 11–9, 7–11, 6–11
Kim Yun-mi	0–3	Aya Umemura	8–11, 5–11, 9–11
Kim Hyang-mi	3–2	Mikie Takahashi	11–8, 11–5, 8–11, 10–12, 11–7
Kim Hyon-hui	2–3	Aya Umemura	6–11, 12–10, 11–8, 7–11, 8–11

2 October	Uzbekistan	0–3	Chinese Taipei

Manzura Inoyatova	1–3	Huang Yi-hua	5–11, 11–9, 5–11, 9–11
Saida Burkhankhodjaeva	0–3	Lu Yun-feng	2–11, 6–11, 4–11
Madina Ayubova	0–3	Su Hsien-ching	3–11, 3–11, 0–11

3 October	North Korea	3–0	Chinese Taipei

Kim Hyang-mi	3–0	Lu Yun-feng	11–2, 11–8, 11–3
Kim Hyon-hui	3–2	Huang Yi-hua	11–13, 11–7, 10–12, 11–5, 11–4
Kim Yun-mi	3–1	Chen Chiu-tan	11–4, 11–9, 9–11, 11–2

3 October	Uzbekistan	3–0	Mongolia

Manzura Inoyatova	3–0	Batsaikhany Batkhishig	11–3, 11–5, 11–4
Saida Burkhankhodjaeva	3–0	Möngöntsetsegiin Batjargal	11–3, 11–1, 11–5
Madina Ayubova	3–0	Tsegmidyn Zolzayaa	Walkover

=== Knockout round ===
Quarterfinals
A1	China	3
Hong Kong	0
Chinese Taipei	0
A2	Singapore	3
B2	North Korea	3
South Korea	1
Uzbekistan	0
B1	Japan	3

Semifinals
A1	China	3
A2	Singapore	0
B2	North Korea	3
B1	Japan	2

Final
A1	China	1
B2	North Korea	3

==== Quarterfinals ====
3 October	China	3–0	Hong Kong

Wang Nan	3–1	Lau Sui Fei	5–11, 14–12, 11–8, 11–8
Zhang Yining	3–0	Tie Ya Na	11–4, 11–9, 11–4
Niu Jianfeng	3–1	Song Ah Sim	11–6, 6–11, 11–7, 11–6

3 October	Chinese Taipei	0–3	Singapore

Huang Yi-hua	1–3	Jing Junhong	2–11, 11–8, 8–11, 10–12
Lu Yun-feng	0–3	Li Jiawei	7–11, 6–11, 4–11
Su Hsien-ching	1–3	Zhang Xueling	14–12, 10–12, 4–11, 7–11

3 October	North Korea	3–1	South Korea

Kim Hyon-hui	3–1	Kim Moo-kyo	11–4, 11–6, 5–11, 11–4
Kim Hyang-mi	3–1	Ryu Ji-hye	11–9, 11–8, 4–11, 11–7
Kim Yun-mi	0–3	Lee Eun-sil	11–13, 5–11, 7–11
Kim Hyon-hui	3–2	Ryu Ji-hye	11–8, 12–10, 6–11, 7–11, 11–8

3 October	Uzbekistan	0–3	Japan

Manzura Inoyatova	0–3	Aya Umemura	8–11, 7–11, 8–11
Saida Burkhankhodjaeva	1–3	An Konishi	2–11, 11–7, 4–11, 6–11
Madina Ayubova	0–3	Mikie Takahashi	4–11, 2–11, 3–11

==== Semifinals ====
4 October	China	3–0	Singapore

Zhang Yining	3–0	Jing Junhong	11–4, 11–9, 11–7
Wang Nan	3–1	Li Jiawei	8–11, 11–5, 11–2, 11–5
Niu Jianfeng	3–1	Zhang Xueling	9–11, 11–5, 12–10, 11–6

4 October	North Korea	3–2	Japan

Kim Hyon-hui	3–0	An Konishi	11–6, 11–7, 12–10
Kim Hyang-mi	3–1	Aya Umemura	11–7, 11–13, 11–6, 11–7
Kim Mi-yong	1–3	Mikie Takahashi	11–6, 4–11, 9–11, 10–12
Kim Hyon-hui	1–3	Aya Umemura	5–11, 11–13, 11–7, 10–12
Kim Hyang-mi	3–2	An Konishi	8–11, 11–9, 10–12, 11–8, 11–4

==== Final ====
4 October	China	1–3	North Korea

Zhang Yining	3–0	Kim Hyon-hui	11–9, 11–9, 11–5
Wang Nan	0–3	Kim Hyang-mi	7–11, 8–11, 6–11
Li Nan	2–3	Kim Yun-mi	11–9, 9–11, 5–11, 13–11, 9–11
Wang Nan	1–3	Kim Hyon-hui	8–11, 11–6, 7–11, 11–13

== Non-participating athletes ==
- Wong Ching (HKG)
- Tsedenbalyn Battsetseg (MGL)
- Ryom Won-ok (PRK)
- Nilufar Sotvoldiyeva (UZB)
