= Table tennis at the 2006 Asian Games – Women's team =

Women's team at the 2006 Asian Games
- Venue: Al-Arabi Indoor Hall
- Dates: 29 November – 3 December 2006
- Competitors: 63 from 14 nations

Medalists
gold medal	China; Chen Qing, Guo Yan, Guo Yue, Li Xiaoxia, Wang Nan
silver medal	Singapore; Li Jiawei, Sun Beibei, Tan Paey Fern, Tan Yan Zhen, Zhang Xueling
bronze medal	North Korea; Kim Jong, Kim Mi-yong, Ko Un-gyong, Ryom Won-ok
bronze medal	South Korea; Kim Kyung-ah, Kwak Bang-bang, Lee Eun-hee, Moon Hyun-jung, Park Mi-young

The women's team table tennis event was part of the table tennis programme and took place between November 29 and December 3, at the Al-Arabi Indoor Hall.

== Schedule ==
All times are Arabia Standard Time (UTC+03:00)

Date	Time	Event
Wednesday, 29 November 2006	10:00	Preliminary round 1
Wednesday, 29 November 2006	16:30	Preliminary round 2
Thursday, 30 November 2006	10:00	Preliminary round 3
Thursday, 30 November 2006	16:30	Quarterfinals
Saturday, 2 December 2006	14:00	Semifinals
Sunday, 3 December 2006	15:00	Final

== Results ==
=== Preliminary round ===
==== Group A ====
Pos	Team	Pld	W	L	MF	MA	Pts	Qualification
1	North Korea	2	2	0	6	0	4	Quarterfinals
2	India	2	1	1	3	3	3	Quarterfinals
3	Uzbekistan	2	0	2	0	6	2	

Source: JTTA

29 November	Uzbekistan	0–3	India

Aliye Ismailova	1–3	Poulomi Ghatak	11–7, 6–11, 11–13, 6–11
Ekaterina Levina	0–3	Mouma Das	4–11, 12–14, 15–17
Madina Ayubova	0–3	Shamini Kumaresan	6–11, 6–11, 2–11

29 November	North Korea	3–0	India

Kim Mi-yong	3–0	Mouma Das	11–2, 11–5, 11–9
Ryom Won-ok	3–0	Poulomi Ghatak	11–2, 11–7, 11–7
Ko Un-gyong	3–0	Shamini Kumaresan	13–11, 11–9, 11–8

30 November	North Korea	3–0	Uzbekistan

Kim Jong	3–0	Ekaterina Levina	11–1, 11–3, 11–4
Kim Mi-yong	3–0	Aliye Ismailova	11–5, 11–2, 11–4
Ko Un-gyong	3–0	Madina Ayubova	11–6, 11–6, 11–8

==== Group B ====
Pos	Team	Pld	W	L	MF	MA	Pts	Qualification
1	China	3	3	0	9	0	6	Quarterfinals
2	Hong Kong	3	2	1	6	3	5	Quarterfinals
3	Vietnam	3	1	2	3	6	4	
4	Kuwait	3	0	3	0	9	3	

Source: JTTA

29 November	China	3–0	Kuwait

Wang Nan	3–0	Fajir Mohammad	11–1, 11–1, 11–0
Chen Qing	3–0	Dalal Al-Hammad	11–2, 11–3, 11–0
Li Xiaoxia	3–0	Aminah Al-Zaidan	11–1, 11–0, 11–1

29 November	Hong Kong	3–0	Vietnam

Lin Ling	3–0	Mai Hoàng Mỹ Trang	11–8, 11–5, 11–5
Tie Ya Na	3–1	Lương Thị Tám	11–6, 11–8, 10–12, 11–4
Lau Sui Fei	3–0	Vũ Thị Hà	11–9, 11–3, 11–4

29 November	China	3–0	Vietnam

Guo Yue	3–0	Lương Thị Tám	11–3, 11–6, 11–3
Li Xiaoxia	3–0	Mai Hoàng Mỹ Trang	11–5, 11–6, 11–4
Guo Yan	3–0	Phạm Thị Thiên Kim	11–3, 11–1, 11–3

29 November	Hong Kong	3–0	Kuwait

Lau Sui Fei	3–0	Dalal Al-Hammad	11–3, 11–3, 11–3
Zhang Rui	3–0	Fajir Mohammad	11–1, 11–2, 11–1
April Yu	3–0	Maryam Sulaiman	11–1, 11–2, 11–2

30 November	China	3–0	Hong Kong

Guo Yue	3–0	Lin Ling	11–4, 11–2, 11–7
Guo Yan	3–0	Tie Ya Na	11–9, 11–6, 11–5
Li Xiaoxia	3–1	Zhang Rui	10–12, 11–7, 11–6, 11–7

30 November	Vietnam	3–0	Kuwait

Mai Hoàng Mỹ Trang	3–0	Fajir Mohammad	11–2, 11–2, 11–1
Lương Thị Tám	3–0	Dalal Al-Hammad	11–7, 11–4, 11–5
Vũ Thị Hà	3–0	Aminah Al-Zaidan	11–4, 11–3, 11–6

==== Group C ====
Pos	Team	Pld	W	L	MF	MA	Pts	Qualification
1	South Korea	3	3	0	9	1	6	Quarterfinals
2	Japan	3	2	1	7	3	5	Quarterfinals
3	Lebanon	3	1	2	3	6	4	
4	Mongolia	3	0	3	0	9	3	

Source: JTTA

29 November	Japan	3–0	Mongolia

Ai Fukuhara	3–0	Batsaikhany Batkhishig	11–2, 11–4, 11–6
Haruna Fukuoka	3–0	Chinbatyn Nomin-Erdene	11–3, 11–3, 11–3
Ai Fujinuma	3–0	Tsegmidyn Zolzayaa	11–3, 11–3, 11–0

29 November	South Korea	3–0	Lebanon

Kim Kyung-ah	3–0	Lara Kejebachian	11–1, 11–1, 11–2
Lee Eun-hee	3–0	Mariana Sahakian	11–6, 11–3, 11–7
Moon Hyun-jung	3–0	Elizabeth Barikian	11–8, 11–4, 11–4

29 November	Japan	3–0	Lebanon

Saki Kanazawa	3–0	Elizabeth Barikian	11–2, 11–9, 11–4
Ai Fukuhara	3–0	Mariana Sahakian	11–2, 11–9, 11–4
Hiroko Fujii	3–0	Noel Kechichian	11–5, 11–6, 11–6

29 November	South Korea	3–0	Mongolia

Kim Kyung-ah	3–0	Chinbatyn Nomin-Erdene	11–2, 11–2, 11–2
Kwak Bang-bang	3–0	Batsaikhany Batkhishig	11–6, 11–5, 11–5
Park Mi-young	3–0	Tsegmidyn Zolzayaa	11–2, 11–3, 11–1

30 November	Japan	1–3	South Korea

Haruna Fukuoka	2–3	Kim Kyung-ah	11–3, 11–8, 3–11, 7–11, 3–11
Ai Fukuhara	2–3	Park Mi-young	5–11, 11–7, 8–11, 11–5, 3–11
Saki Kanazawa	3–0	Kwak Bang-bang	11–9, 11–7, 11–5
Ai Fukuhara	2–3	Kim Kyung-ah	11–8, 11–7, 6–11, 11–13, 8–11

30 November	Lebanon	3–0	Mongolia

Elizabeth Barikian	3–2	Batsaikhany Batkhishig	5–11, 11–2, 11–13, 11–9, 13–11
Mariana Sahakian	3–0	Chinbatyn Nomin-Erdene	11–4, 11–2, 11–5
Lara Kejebachian	3–1	Tsegmidyn Zolzayaa	11–6, 11–2, 9–11, 11–4

==== Group D ====
Pos	Team	Pld	W	L	MF	MA	Pts	Qualification
1	Singapore	2	2	0	6	1	4	Quarterfinals
2	Thailand	2	1	1	4	3	3	Quarterfinals
3	Macau	2	0	2	0	6	2	

Source: JTTA

29 November	Thailand	3–0	Macau

Nanthana Komwong	3–0	Chan Lai Ha	11–7, 11–4, 11–6
Anisara Muangsuk	3–0	Ma Chao In	11–7, 11–1, 11–6
Suttilux Rattanaprayoon	3–0	Wong Iok Sim	11–3, 11–4, 11–4

29 November	Singapore	3–0	Macau

Sun Beibei	3–0	Ma Chao In	11–3, 11–6, 11–8
Tan Paey Fern	3–0	Cheong Cheng I	11–4, 11–6, 11–2
Li Jiawei	3–0	Wong Sio Leng	11–5, 11–7, 11–5

30 November	Singapore	3–1	Thailand

Sun Beibei	1–3	Nanthana Komwong	4–11, 11–6, 9–11, 9–11
Li Jiawei	3–0	Anisara Muangsuk	11–8, 11–5, 13–11
Zhang Xueling	3–0	Suttilux Rattanaprayoon	11–4, 11–6, 11–2
Li Jiawei	3–2	Nanthana Komwong	11–5, 10–12, 11–5, 8–11, 11–9

=== Knockout round ===
Quarterfinals
A1	North Korea	3
Thailand	0
Hong Kong	1
D1	Singapore	3
C1	South Korea	3
India	0
Japan	0
B1	China	3

Semifinals
A1	North Korea	2
D1	Singapore	3
C1	South Korea	0
B1	China	3

Final
D1	Singapore	0
B1	China	3

==== Quarterfinals ====
30 November	North Korea	3–0	Thailand

Kim Mi-yong	3–0	Anisara Muangsuk	11–6, 11–9, 11–6
Ryom Won-ok	3–2	Nanthana Komwong	11–6, 15–13, 9–11, 10–12, 11–6
Ko Un-gyong	3–0	Suttilux Rattanaprayoon	11–5, 11–6, 11–3

30 November	Hong Kong	1–3	Singapore

Lin Ling	1–3	Li Jiawei	8–11, 6–11, 12–10, 6–11
Tie Ya Na	0–3	Sun Beibei	7–11, 9–11, 7–11
Lau Sui Fei	3–2	Zhang Xueling	6–11, 11–8, 11–6, 11–13, 12–10
Tie Ya Na	0–3	Li Jiawei	10–12, 3–11, 5–11

30 November	South Korea	3–0	India

Kim Kyung-ah	3–1	Poulomi Ghatak	11–5, 11–2, 11–13, 11–4
Park Mi-young	3–0	Mouma Das	11–6, 11–5, 11–6
Kwak Bang-bang	3–0	Shamini Kumaresan	11–7, 11–4, 11–6

30 November	Japan	0–3	China

Saki Kanazawa	1–3	Wang Nan	11–8, 8–11, 7–11, 9–11
Ai Fukuhara	1–3	Guo Yue	10–12, 6–11, 12–10, 20–22
Haruna Fukuoka	1–3	Guo Yan	8–11, 12–10, 6–11, 5–11

==== Semifinals ====
2 December	North Korea	2–3	Singapore

Kim Mi-yong	1–3	Sun Beibei	11–13, 11–7, 1–11, 7–11
Kim Jong	0–3	Li Jiawei	10–12, 9–11, 7–11
Ko Un-gyong	3–0	Zhang Xueling	11–9, 11–6, 11–5
Kim Mi-yong	3–0	Li Jiawei	11–5, 11–4, 11–7
Kim Jong	2–3	Sun Beibei	11–7, 11–6, 8–11, 8–11, 10–12

2 December	South Korea	0–3	China

Kim Kyung-ah	0–3	Wang Nan	8–11, 4–11, 10–12
Park Mi-young	2–3	Guo Yue	3–11, 11–8, 9–11, 11–8, 7–11
Kwak Bang-bang	1–3	Guo Yan	6–11, 6–11, 11–9, 6–11

==== Final ====
3 December	Singapore	0–3	China

Sun Beibei	1–3	Wang Nan	11–9, 7–11, 8–11, 8–11
Li Jiawei	1–3	Guo Yan	7–11, 5–11, 11–9, 8–11
Tan Paey Fern	0–3	Guo Yue	7–11, 6–11, 5–11

== Non-participating athletes ==
- Kasturi Chakraborty (IND)
- Mousumi Paul (IND)
- Tan Yan Zhen (SIN)
- Tidaporn Vongboon (THA)
- Nodira Burkhankhodjaeva (UZB)
- Saida Burkhankhodjaeva (UZB)
