= Table tennis at the 2006 Asian Games =

- Venue: Al-Arabi Indoor Hall
- Dates: 29 November – 7 December 2006
- Competitors: 144 from 22 nations

Table Tennis was contested by men and women at the 2006 Asian Games in Doha, Qatar from November 29 to December 7. It was one of six sports to begin prior to the Opening Ceremonies on December 1. Singles, Doubles, and Team events were held with all competition taking place at the Al-Arabi Indoor Hall.

== Schedule ==
P	Preliminary rounds	¼	Quarterfinals	½	Semifinals	F	Final

Event↓/Date →	29th Wed	30th Thu		1st Fri	2nd Sat	3rd Sun	4th Mon	5th Tue		6th Wed		7th Thu
Men's singles					P		P	P	¼	½		F
Men's doubles							P	¼		½	F	
Men's team	P	P	¼		½	F						
Women's singles					P		P	P	¼	½		F
Women's doubles							P	¼		½	F	
Women's team	P	P	¼		½	F						
Mixed doubles						P	P	¼		½		F

== Medalists ==
Event	Gold	Silver	Bronze
Men's singles	Wang Hao; China	Ma Lin; China	Li Ching; Hong Kong
Men's singles	Wang Hao; China	Ma Lin; China	Ryu Seung-min; South Korea
Men's doubles	Hong Kong; Ko Lai Chak; Li Ching	China; Chen Qi; Ma Lin	Chinese Taipei; Chiang Peng-lung; Chuang Chih-yuan
Men's doubles	Hong Kong; Ko Lai Chak; Li Ching	China; Chen Qi; Ma Lin	China; Ma Long; Wang Hao
Men's team	China; Chen Qi; Hao Shuai; Ma Lin; Ma Long; Wang Hao	South Korea; Joo Sae-hyuk; Lee Jung-woo; Oh Sang-eun; Ryu Seung-min; Yoon Jae-young	Chinese Taipei; Chang Yen-shu; Chiang Peng-lung; Chou Tung-yu; Chuang Chih-yuan; Wu Chih-chi
Men's team	China; Chen Qi; Hao Shuai; Ma Lin; Ma Long; Wang Hao	South Korea; Joo Sae-hyuk; Lee Jung-woo; Oh Sang-eun; Ryu Seung-min; Yoon Jae-young	Hong Kong; Cheung Yuk; Ko Lai Chak; Leung Chu Yan; Li Ching; Tse Ka Chun
Women's singles	Guo Yue; China	Tie Ya Na; Hong Kong	Wang Nan; China
Women's singles	Guo Yue; China	Tie Ya Na; Hong Kong	Li Jiawei; Singapore
Women's doubles	China; Guo Yue; Li Xiaoxia	Hong Kong; Tie Ya Na; Zhang Rui	Chinese Taipei; Huang Yi-hua; Lu Yun-feng
Women's doubles	China; Guo Yue; Li Xiaoxia	Hong Kong; Tie Ya Na; Zhang Rui	China; Chen Qing; Wang Nan
Women's team	China; Chen Qing; Guo Yan; Guo Yue; Li Xiaoxia; Wang Nan	Singapore; Li Jiawei; Sun Beibei; Tan Paey Fern; Tan Yan Zhen; Zhang Xueling	North Korea; Kim Jong; Kim Mi-yong; Ko Un-gyong; Ryom Won-ok
Women's team	China; Chen Qing; Guo Yan; Guo Yue; Li Xiaoxia; Wang Nan	Singapore; Li Jiawei; Sun Beibei; Tan Paey Fern; Tan Yan Zhen; Zhang Xueling	South Korea; Kim Kyung-ah; Kwak Bang-bang; Lee Eun-hee; Moon Hyun-jung; Park Mi-young
Mixed doubles	China; Ma Lin; Wang Nan	South Korea; Lee Jung-woo; Lee Eun-hee	South Korea; Joo Sae-hyuk; Kim Kyung-ah
Mixed doubles	China; Ma Lin; Wang Nan	South Korea; Lee Jung-woo; Lee Eun-hee	Singapore; Yang Zi; Li Jiawei

== Medal table ==
Rank	Nation	Gold	Silver	Bronze	Total
1	China (CHN)	6	2	3	11
2	Hong Kong (HKG)	1	2	2	5
3	South Korea (KOR)	0	2	3	5
4	Singapore (SIN)	0	1	2	3
5	Chinese Taipei (TPE)	0	0	3	3
6	North Korea (PRK)	0	0	1	1
Totals (6 entries)		7	7	14	28

== Participating nations ==
A total of 144 athletes from 22 nations competed in table tennis at the 2006 Asian Games:

- Bahrain (5)
- China (10)
- Chinese Taipei (7)
- Hong Kong (10)
- India (10)
- Japan (9)
- Kuwait (5)
- Lebanon (4)
- Macau (10)
- Mongolia (6)
- North Korea (7)
- Palestine (5)
- Philippines (2)
- Qatar (5)
- Singapore (10)
- South Korea (10)
- Sri Lanka (4)
- Tajikistan (3)
- Thailand (4)
- Uzbekistan (5)
- Vietnam (8)
- Yemen (5)
