= Table tennis at the 2006 Asian Games – Mixed doubles =

Mixed doubles at the 2006 Asian Games
- Venue: Al-Arabi Indoor Hall
- Dates: 3–7 December 2006
- Competitors: 50 from 13 nations

Medalists
gold medal	Ma Lin; Wang Nan	China
silver medal	Lee Jung-woo; Lee Eun-hee	South Korea
bronze medal	Joo Sae-hyuk; Kim Kyung-ah	South Korea
bronze medal	Yang Zi; Li Jiawei	Singapore

The mixed doubles table tennis event was part of the table tennis programme and took place between December 3 and 7, at the Al-Arabi Indoor Hall.

== Schedule ==
All times are Arabia Standard Time (UTC+03:00)

Date	Time	Event
Sunday, 3 December 2006	10:45	Round of 32
Monday, 4 December 2006	20:00	Round of 16
Tuesday, 5 December 2006	10:00	Quarterfinals
Wednesday, 6 December 2006	10:00	Semifinals
Thursday, 7 December 2006	13:00	Final

== Results ==
=== Finals ===
Semifinals						Final
1	Ma Lin (CHN); Wang Nan (CHN)	12	11	13	11
4	Joo Sae-hyuk (KOR); Kim Kyung-ah (KOR)	10	7	11	7	1	Ma Lin (CHN); Wang Nan (CHN)	11	12	8	19	8	11
5	Yang Zi (SIN); Li Jiawei (SIN)	6	8	9	4	7	Lee Jung-woo (KOR); Lee Eun-hee (KOR)	5	10	11	17	11	8
7	Lee Jung-woo (KOR); Lee Eun-hee (KOR)	11	11	11	11

=== Top half ===
==== Section 1 ====
Round of 32					Round of 16						Quarterfinals
					1	Ma Lin (CHN); Wang Nan (CHN)	11	11	11
Rohan Sirisena (SRI); Deepika Rodrigo (SRI)	4	2	7			Kim Song-chol (PRK); Ryom Won-ok (PRK)	4	9	8
Kim Song-chol (PRK); Ryom Won-ok (PRK)	11	11	11								1	Ma Lin (CHN); Wang Nan (CHN)	11	11	15	11
Soumyadeep Roy (IND); Mouma Das (IND)	9	11	3	10							6	Ko Lai Chak (HKG); Zhang Rui (HKG)	9	9	17	5
Gao Ning (SIN); Zhang Xueling (SIN)	11	8	11	12		Gao Ning (SIN); Zhang Xueling (SIN)	15	5	7	13
					6	Ko Lai Chak (HKG); Zhang Rui (HKG)	13	11	11	15

==== Section 2 ====
Round of 32					Round of 16					Quarterfinals
					8	Kaii Yoshida (JPN); Haruna Fukuoka (JPN)	10	4	5
Vong Hon Weng (MAC); Wong Sio Leng (MAC)	5	5	3			Chuang Chih-yuan (TPE); Huang Yi-hua (TPE)	12	11	11
Chuang Chih-yuan (TPE); Huang Yi-hua (TPE)	11	11	11								Chuang Chih-yuan (TPE); Huang Yi-hua (TPE)	6	6	5
Yadmaagiin Begz (MGL); Chinbatyn Nomin-Erdene (MGL)	6	4	11	6						4	Joo Sae-hyuk (KOR); Kim Kyung-ah (KOR)	11	11	11
Đinh Quang Linh (VIE); Lương Thị Tám (VIE)	11	11	8	11		Đinh Quang Linh (VIE); Lương Thị Tám (VIE)	3	5	4
					4	Joo Sae-hyuk (KOR); Kim Kyung-ah (KOR)	11	11	11

=== Bottom half ===
==== Section 3 ====
Round of 32				Round of 16							Quarterfinals
				3	Li Ching (HKG); Tie Ya Na (HKG)	11	11	11
Iam Tong Hou (MAC); Ma Chao In (MAC)	8	5	5		Nguyễn Nam Hải (VIE); Mai Hoàng Mỹ Trang (VIE)	5	9	4
Nguyễn Nam Hải (VIE); Mai Hoàng Mỹ Trang (VIE)	11	11	11								3	Li Ching (HKG); Tie Ya Na (HKG)	11	11	8	8	2
Ibrahim Al-Hasan (KUW); Fajir Mohammad (KUW)	5	1	7								5	Yang Zi (SIN); Li Jiawei (SIN)	2	4	11	11	11
Seiya Kishikawa (JPN); Ai Fujinuma (JPN)	11	11	11		Seiya Kishikawa (JPN); Ai Fujinuma (JPN)	7	12	9	11	9
				5	Yang Zi (SIN); Li Jiawei (SIN)	11	10	11	7	11

==== Section 4 ====
Round of 32
7	Lee Jung-woo (KOR); Lee Eun-hee (KOR)	11	11	11
Sharath Kamal (IND); Poulomi Ghatak (IND)	6	8	9
Thilina Piyadasa (SRI); Kalpani Herath (SRI)	9	11	12	11
Lkhagvadorjiin Altantulga (MGL); Batsaikhany Batkhishig (MGL)	11	9	10	5
Chiang Peng-lung (TPE); Lu Yun-feng (TPE)	12	9	6	4
Ri Chol-guk (PRK); Kim Mi-yong (PRK)	10	11	11	11

Round of 16
7	Lee Jung-woo (KOR); Lee Eun-hee (KOR)	11	11	11
Thilina Piyadasa (SRI); Kalpani Herath (SRI)	4	2	3
Ri Chol-guk (PRK); Kim Mi-yong (PRK)	5	7	4
2	Ma Long (CHN); Guo Yan (CHN)	11	11	11

Quarterfinals
7	Lee Jung-woo (KOR); Lee Eun-hee (KOR)	11	11	11	9	12
2	Ma Long (CHN); Guo Yan (CHN)	7	13	9	11	10
