= Table tennis at the 2010 Asian Games – Women's doubles =

Women's doubles at the 2010 Asian Games
- Venue: Guangzhou Gymnasium
- Dates: 17–19 November 2010
- Competitors: 64 from 19 nations

Medalists
| gold medal | Guo Yue; Li Xiaoxia | China |
| silver medal | Ding Ning; Liu Shiwen | China |
| bronze medal | Ai Fukuhara; Kasumi Ishikawa | Japan |
| bronze medal | Hiroko Fujii; Misako Wakamiya | Japan |

The women's doubles table tennis event was part of the table tennis programme and took place between November 17 and 19, at the Guangzhou Gymnasium.

== Schedule ==
All times are China Standard Time (UTC+08:00)

| Date | Time | Event |
|---|---|---|
| Wednesday, 17 November 2010 | 19:45 | 1/16 round |
| Thursday, 18 November 2010 | 12:15 | 1/8 finals |
| Thursday, 18 November 2010 | 15:45 | Quarterfinals |
| Friday, 19 November 2010 | 10:00 | Semifinals |
| Friday, 19 November 2010 | 19:00 | Final |

== Results ==
Legend

- WO — Won by walkover

=== Finals ===
| Semifinals | | | | | | | Final |
| 1 | Ding Ning (CHN); Liu Shiwen (CHN) | 11 | 11 | 11 | 11 |
| 6 | Ai Fukuhara (JPN); Kasumi Ishikawa (JPN) | 8 | 8 | 5 | 7 | | 1 | Ding Ning (CHN); Liu Shiwen (CHN) | 5 | 7 | 6 | 9 |
| 3 | Guo Yue (CHN); Li Xiaoxia (CHN) | 11 | 11 | 11 | 11 | 11 | 3 | Guo Yue (CHN); Li Xiaoxia (CHN) | 11 | 11 | 11 | 11 |
| | Hiroko Fujii (JPN); Misako Wakamiya (JPN) | 3 | 1 | 13 | 2 | 7 |

=== Top half ===
==== Section 1 ====
1/16 round
1 | Ding Ning (CHN); Liu Shiwen (CHN) | 11 | 11 | 11
Han Hye-song (PRK); Hyon Ryon-hui (PRK) | 3 | 6 | 7
Swechchha Nembang (NEP); Nabita Shrestha (NEP) | 11 | 11 | 11
Maha Faramarzi (QAT); Aya Majdi (QAT) | 4 | 8 | 5
Sengdavieng Douangpanya (LAO); Dalavone Manichanh (LAO) | 11 | 10 | 11 | 12
Mueena Mohamed (MDV); Fathimath Jumana Nimal (MDV) | 8 | 12 | 5 | 10
Mouma Das (IND); Poulomi Ghatak (IND) | 5 | 5 | 2
7 | Li Jiawei (SIN); Sun Beibei (SIN) | 11 | 11 | 11

1/8 finals
1 | Ding Ning (CHN); Liu Shiwen (CHN) | 11 | 11 | 11
Swechchha Nembang (NEP); Nabita Shrestha (NEP) | 2 | 3 | 4
Sengdavieng Douangpanya (LAO); Dalavone Manichanh (LAO) | 8 | 4 | 5
7 | Li Jiawei (SIN); Sun Beibei (SIN) | 11 | 11 | 11

Quarterfinals
1 | Ding Ning (CHN); Liu Shiwen (CHN) | 9 | 11 | 11 | 11
7 | Li Jiawei (SIN); Sun Beibei (SIN) | 11 | 4 | 6 | 4

==== Section 2 ====
1/16 round
6 | Ai Fukuhara (JPN); Kasumi Ishikawa (JPN) | 11 | 11 | 11
Lương Thị Tám (VIE); Phạm Thị Thiên Kim (VIE) | 3 | 7 | 3
Maisson Al-Bshlawi (SYR); Souha Annos (SYR) | 3 | 3 | 3
Suthasini Sawettabut (THA); Tidaporn Vongboon (THA) | 11 | 11 | 11
Nodira Burkhankhodjaeva (UZB); Olga Kim (UZB)
Lin Ling (HKG); Zhang Rui (HKG) | W | O
Hsiung Nai-i (TPE); Lee I-chen (TPE) | 11 | 6 | 4 | 9
4 | Kim Kyung-ah (KOR); Park Mi-young (KOR) | 5 | 11 | 11 | 11

1/8 finals
6 | Ai Fukuhara (JPN); Kasumi Ishikawa (JPN) | 11 | 8 | 11 | 11
Suthasini Sawettabut (THA); Tidaporn Vongboon (THA) | 2 | 11 | 6 | 6
Lin Ling (HKG); Zhang Rui (HKG) | 8 | 11 | 7 | 11 | 1
4 | Kim Kyung-ah (KOR); Park Mi-young (KOR) | 11 | 9 | 11 | 8 | 11

Quarterfinals
6 | Ai Fukuhara (JPN); Kasumi Ishikawa (JPN) | 11 | 4 | 11 | 14
4 | Kim Kyung-ah (KOR); Park Mi-young (KOR) | 7 | 11 | 7 | 12

=== Bottom half ===
==== Section 3 ====
1/16 round
3 | Guo Yue (CHN); Li Xiaoxia (CHN) | 12 | 11 | 16
Seok Ha-jung (KOR); Yang Ha-eun (KOR) | 10 | 3 | 14
Renuka Khatri (NEP); Elina Maharjan (NEP) | 9 | 5 | 9
Sengdavy Phiathep (LAO); Thiphakone Southamavong (LAO) | 11 | 11 | 11
Beh Lee Wei (MAS); Ng Sock Khim (MAS) | 11 | 2 | 11 | 6 | 7
Kim Hye-song (PRK); Kim Jong (PRK) | 8 | 11 | 9 | 11 | 11
Shamini Kumaresan (IND); Madhurika Patkar (IND) | 11 | 3 | 12 | 4 | 4
8 | Cheng I-ching (TPE); Huang Yi-hua (TPE) | 5 | 11 | 10 | 11 | 11

1/8 finals
3 | Guo Yue (CHN); Li Xiaoxia (CHN) | 11 | 11 | 11
Sengdavy Phiathep (LAO); Thiphakone Southamavong (LAO) | 2 | 1 | 1
Kim Hye-song (PRK); Kim Jong (PRK) | 11 | 7 | 7 | 8
8 | Cheng I-ching (TPE); Huang Yi-hua (TPE) | 6 | 11 | 11 | 11

Quarterfinals
3 | Guo Yue (CHN); Li Xiaoxia (CHN) | 11 | 11 | 11
8 | Cheng I-ching (TPE); Huang Yi-hua (TPE) | 7 | 6 | 7

==== Section 4 ====
1/16 round
5 | Jiang Huajun (HKG); Tie Ya Na (HKG) | 11 | 9 | 9 | 11 | 11
Hiroko Fujii (JPN); Misako Wakamiya (JPN) | 4 | 11 | 11 | 6 | 13
Nanthana Komwong (THA); Anisara Muangsuk (THA) | 11 | 11 | 11
Cheong Cheng I (MAC); Ma Chao In (MAC) | 5 | 7 | 6
Rimma Gufranova (UZB); Indira Kagirova (UZB) | 9 | 6 | 6
Zulfiniso Saidalimova (TJK); Sumayai Amiri (TJK) | 11 | 11 | 11
Mai Hoàng Mỹ Trang (VIE); Mai Xuân Hằng (VIE) | 7 | 6 | 9
2 | Feng Tianwei (SIN); Wang Yuegu (SIN) | 11 | 11 | 11

1/8 finals
Hiroko Fujii (JPN); Misako Wakamiya (JPN) | 11 | 11 | 11
Nanthana Komwong (THA); Anisara Muangsuk (THA) | 0 | 5 | 5
Zulfiniso Saidalimova (TJK); Sumayai Amiri (TJK) | 4 | 3 | 4
2 | Feng Tianwei (SIN); Wang Yuegu (SIN) | 11 | 11 | 11

Quarterfinals
Hiroko Fujii (JPN); Misako Wakamiya (JPN) | 12 | 11 | 11
2 | Feng Tianwei (SIN); Wang Yuegu (SIN) | 10 | 6 | 8
