= Kiril Popov =

Kiril Popov may refer to:

- Kiril Popov (table tennis)
- Kiril Popov (footballer)
- Kiril Popov (mathematician)
