= Table tennis at the 2010 Asian Games – Women's singles =

Table tennis event

Women's singles at the 2010 Asian Games
- Venue: Guangzhou Gymnasium
- Dates: 15–20 November 2010
- Competitors: 44 from 24 nations

Medalists
gold medal	Li Xiaoxia	China
silver medal	Guo Yue	China
bronze medal	Kim Kyung-ah	South Korea
bronze medal	Ai Fukuhara	Japan

The women's singles table tennis event was part of the table tennis programme and took place between November 15 and 20, at the Guangzhou Gymnasium.

== Schedule ==
All times are China Standard Time (UTC+08:00)

Date	Time	Event
Monday, 15 November 2010	13:00	1/32 round
Thursday, 18 November 2010	10:00	1/16 round
Thursday, 18 November 2010	14:00	1/8 finals
Thursday, 18 November 2010	20:00	Quarterfinals
Saturday, 20 November 2010	10:00	Semifinals
Saturday, 20 November 2010	19:00	Final

== Results ==
=== Finals ===
Quarterfinals
1	Feng Tianwei (SIN)	11	8	9	7	4
5	Li Xiaoxia (CHN)	9	11	11	11	11
10	Sayaka Hirano (JPN)	9	6	9	5
3	Kim Kyung-ah (KOR)	11	11	11	11
4	Wang Yuegu (SIN)	11	8	3	11	10	11
7	Ai Fukuhara (JPN)	7	11	11	9	12	13
6	Jiang Huajun (HKG)	10	11	8	8
2	Guo Yue (CHN)	12	13	11	11

Semifinals
5	Li Xiaoxia (CHN)	11	11	11	11
3	Kim Kyung-ah (KOR)	8	7	5	5
7	Ai Fukuhara (JPN)	11	12	8	11	9	8	8
2	Guo Yue (CHN)	5	10	11	9	11	11	11

Final
5	Li Xiaoxia (CHN)	5	4	11	11	11	12	11
2	Guo Yue (CHN)	11	11	13	8	6	10	9

=== Top half ===
==== Section 1 ====
1/32 round						1/16 round						1/8 finals
						1	Feng Tianwei (SIN)	11	11	11	11
Mueena Mohamed (MDV)	11	11	16	9	11		Mueena Mohamed (MDV)	4	2	3	2
Renuka Khatri (NEP)	7	5	14	11	9							1	Feng Tianwei (SIN)	11	13	8	9	6	11	11
												12	Cheng I-ching (TPE)	8	11	11	11	11	2	8
							Jennet Hanowa (TKM)	4	7	5	4
						12	Cheng I-ching (TPE)	11	11	11	11

==== Section 2 ====
1/32 round						1/16 round						1/8 finals
						15	Suthasini Sawettabut (THA)	11	11	11	11
Sengdavieng Douangpanya (LAO)	11	11	11	6	13		Sengdavieng Douangpanya (LAO)	5	3	4	4
Nodira Burkhankhodjaeva (UZB)	8	8	9	11	11							15	Suthasini Sawettabut (THA)	7	9	4	4
Aya Majdi (QAT)	12	10	8	7								5	Li Xiaoxia (CHN)	11	11	11	11
Zulfiniso Saidalimova (TJK)	14	12	11	11			Zulfiniso Saidalimova (TJK)	1	2	3	3
						5	Li Xiaoxia (CHN)	11	11	11	11

==== Section 3 ====
1/32 round					1/16 round								1/8 finals
					8	Tie Ya Na (HKG)	11	11	11	11
Safaa Salah (PLE)	8	1	2	6		Souha Annos (SYR)	4	6	7	1
Souha Annos (SYR)	11	11	11	11									8	Tie Ya Na (HKG)	8	5	6	10
Shamini Kumaresan (IND)	11	11	11	11									10	Sayaka Hirano (JPN)	11	11	11	12
Surakhbayaryn Misheel (MGL)	5	1	2	4		Shamini Kumaresan (IND)	7	5	11	7	11	7
					10	Sayaka Hirano (JPN)	11	11	7	11	7	11

==== Section 4 ====
1/32 round					1/16 round						1/8 finals
					13	Kim Jong (PRK)	11	11	11	11
						Ng Sock Khim (MAS)	3	4	3	8
											13	Kim Jong (PRK)	13	6	11	3	9	8
Ma Chao In (MAC)	5	7	2	2							3	Kim Kyung-ah (KOR)	11	11	5	11	11	11
Mai Xuân Hằng (VIE)	11	11	11	11		Mai Xuân Hằng (VIE)	2	4	3	6
					3	Kim Kyung-ah (KOR)	11	11	11	11

=== Bottom half ===
==== Section 5 ====
1/32 round						1/16 round								1/8 finals
						4	Wang Yuegu (SIN)	11	11	11	11
Barkhasyn Enkhjin (MGL)	7	7	8	13	8		Sumayai Amiri (TJK)	5	5	3	8
Sumayai Amiri (TJK)	11	11	11	11	11									4	Wang Yuegu (SIN)	14	11	11	10	11
															Kim Hye-song (PRK)	12	7	6	12	5
							Kim Hye-song (PRK)	7	11	11	4	11	11
						14	Nanthana Komwong (THA)	11	6	4	11	4	4

==== Section 6 ====
1/32 round							1/16 round							1/8 finals
							11	Huang Yi-hua (TPE)	11	9	11	14	11
Madhurika Patkar (IND)	11	8	9	8	11	9		Mai Hoàng Mỹ Trang (VIE)	6	11	6	12	8
Mai Hoàng Mỹ Trang (VIE)	3	11	11	11	5	11								11	Huang Yi-hua (TPE)	8	8	8	5
Fathimath Jumana Nimal (MDV)	3	7	7	1										7	Ai Fukuhara (JPN)	11	11	11	11
Olga Kim (UZB)	11	11	11	11				Olga Kim (UZB)	6	4	2	5
							7	Ai Fukuhara (JPN)	11	11	11	11

==== Section 7 ====
1/32 round						1/16 round						1/8 finals
						6	Jiang Huajun (HKG)	11	11	11	11
Ishara Madurangi (SRI)	11	10	11	11	11		Ishara Madurangi (SRI)	2	3	5	2
Nabita Shrestha (NEP)	5	12	9	7	7							6	Jiang Huajun (HKG)	11	11	11	11
Cheong Cheng I (MAC)	11	11	11	11								16	Beh Lee Wei (MAS)	7	3	6	8
Maha Faramarzi (QAT)	7	3	9	4			Cheong Cheng I (MAC)	1	3	5	5
						16	Beh Lee Wei (MAS)	11	11	11	11

==== Section 8 ====
1/32 round					1/16 round						1/8 finals
					9	Park Mi-young (KOR)	11	11	11	11
						Tvin Carole Moumjoghlian (LIB)	4	4	1	6
											9	Park Mi-young (KOR)	11	3	5	6	6
Thiphakone Southamavong (LAO)	11	11	11	11							2	Guo Yue (CHN)	7	11	11	11	11
Maisson Al-Bshlawi (SYR)	3	5	2	4		Thiphakone Southamavong (LAO)	5	1	1	4
					2	Guo Yue (CHN)	11	11	11	11
