= Table tennis at the 2006 Asian Games – Men's singles =

Men's singles at the 2006 Asian Games
- Venue: Al-Arabi Indoor Hall
- Dates: 2–7 December 2006
- Competitors: 36 from 19 nations

Medalists
gold medal	Wang Hao	China
silver medal	Ma Lin	China
bronze medal	Li Ching	Hong Kong
bronze medal	Ryu Seung-min	South Korea

The men's singles table tennis event was part of the table tennis programme and took place between December 2 and 7, at the Al-Arabi Indoor Hall.

== Schedule ==
All times are Arabia Standard Time (UTC+03:00)

Date	Time	Event
Saturday, 2 December 2006	11:00	Round of 64
Monday, 4 December 2006	16:30	Round of 32
Tuesday, 5 December 2006	13:00	Round of 16
Tuesday, 5 December 2006	18:30	Quarterfinals
Wednesday, 6 December 2006	17:00	Semifinals
Thursday, 7 December 2006	16:00	Final

== Results ==
=== Finals ===
Quarterfinals
1	Ma Lin (CHN)	10	4	11	11	11	11
8	Chiang Peng-lung (TPE)	12	11	8	5	5	7
6	Li Ching (HKG)	13	7	11	11	8	11
3	Oh Sang-eun (KOR)	11	11	5	7	11	2
4	Ryu Seung-min (KOR)	11	11	4	12	11
5	Chuang Chih-yuan (TPE)	7	9	11	10	5
7	Cheung Yuk (HKG)	10	11	11	7	7	2
2	Wang Hao (CHN)	12	9	8	11	11	11

Semifinals
1	Ma Lin (CHN)	8	11	14	11	11
6	Li Ching (HKG)	11	9	12	3	9
4	Ryu Seung-min (KOR)	2	13	13	2	9
2	Wang Hao (CHN)	11	11	15	11	11

Final
1	Ma Lin (CHN)	11	10	4	12	9
2	Wang Hao (CHN)	9	12	11	14	11

=== Top half ===
==== Section 1 ====
Round of 64	Round of 32						Round of 16
	1	Ma Lin (CHN)
		Bye
							1	Ma Lin (CHN)	11	11	11	11
							10	Yang Zi (SIN)	6	9	6	6
		Hatem Wadi (PLE)	1	3	5	4
	10	Yang Zi (SIN)	11	11	11	11

==== Section 2 ====
Round of 64					Round of 32							Round of 16
					13	Sharath Kamal (IND)	11	11	13	11	11
Ahmed Al-Mohannadi (QAT)	8	6	7	7		Đoàn Kiến Quốc (VIE)	6	7	15	5	9
Đoàn Kiến Quốc (VIE)	11	11	11	11								13	Sharath Kamal (IND)	5	5	8	4
												8	Chiang Peng-lung (TPE)	11	11	11	11
						Yadmaagiin Begz (MGL)	3	2	6	4
					8	Chiang Peng-lung (TPE)	11	11	11	11

==== Section 3 ====
Round of 64						Round of 32						Round of 16
						6	Li Ching (HKG)	11	19	11	11
							Ibrahim Al-Hasan (KUW)	4	17	8	3
												6	Li Ching (HKG)	11	11	11	11	8	11
Hamad Buhijji (BRN)	11	11	11	7	11							14	Ri Chol-guk (PRK)	8	8	13	7	11	8
Ernesto Ebuen (PHI)	5	9	7	11	8		Hamad Buhijji (BRN)	3	4	3	10
						14	Ri Chol-guk (PRK)	11	11	11	12

==== Section 4 ====
Round of 64							Round of 32						Round of 16
							11	Yo Kan (JPN)	11	11	11	11
Wael Al-Qershi (YEM)	15	10	5	7	11	7		Thilina Piyadasa (SRI)	8	4	9	9
Thilina Piyadasa (SRI)	13	12	11	11	7	11							11	Yo Kan (JPN)	12	11	11	10	4	12	8
													3	Oh Sang-eun (KOR)	14	7	9	12	11	10	11
								Khurshed Salibaev (TJK)	2	1	2	3
							3	Oh Sang-eun (KOR)	11	11	11	11

=== Bottom half ===
==== Section 5 ====
Round of 64	Round of 32							Round of 16
	4	Ryu Seung-min (KOR)	11	11	14	11
		Trần Tuấn Quỳnh (VIE)	7	4	12	3
								4	Ryu Seung-min (KOR)	12	11	9	11	12
								15	An Chol-yong (PRK)	10	5	11	6	10
		Waleed Al-Hajjai (QAT)	7	11	2	6	0
	15	An Chol-yong (PRK)	11	6	11	11	11

==== Section 6 ====
Round of 64						Round of 32						Round of 16
						9	Gao Ning (SIN)	11	11	11	11
Rohan Sirisena (SRI)	11	11	7	12	11		Rohan Sirisena (SRI)	2	3	5	1
Sirojiddin Ismoilov (TJK)	6	8	11	10	3							9	Gao Ning (SIN)	10	2	11	12	10
												5	Chuang Chih-yuan (TPE)	12	11	6	14	12
							Richard Gonzales (PHI)	2	4	8	5
						5	Chuang Chih-yuan (TPE)	11	11	11	11

==== Section 7 ====
Round of 64					Round of 32						Round of 16
					7	Cheung Yuk (HKG)	11	11	11	11
						Cheong Chi Yung (MAC)	5	2	5	4
											7	Cheung Yuk (HKG)	11	13	11	11	11
Anwar Makki (BRN)	11	11	11	11							16	Soumyadeep Roy (IND)	7	11	13	5	8
Basher Salah (PLE)	7	8	5	7		Anwar Makki (BRN)	8	5	5	4
					16	Soumyadeep Roy (IND)	11	11	11	11

==== Section 8 ====
Round of 64	Round of 32						Round of 16
	12	Jun Mizutani (JPN)	11	11	11	11
		Lkhagvadorjiin Altantulga (MGL)	3	1	9	4
							12	Jun Mizutani (JPN)	12	9	5	3	8
							2	Wang Hao (CHN)	10	11	11	11	11
		Mohammed Al-Hashedi (YEM)	4	2	6	8
	2	Wang Hao (CHN)	11	11	11	11
