= Qiu Yike =

Chinese table tennis player

Personal information
- Nationality: China
- Born: 18 January 1985 (age 41)
Medal record
Representing China
World Table Tennis Championships
Bronze medal – third place	2005	Mixed Doubles
Bronze medal – third place	2007	Mixed Doubles

Qiu Yike (born 18 January 1985), is a male Chinese international table tennis player.

He won the bronze medal at the 2005 World Table Tennis Championships Mixed Doubles and 2007 World Table Tennis Championships – Mixed Doubles with Cao Zhen.

== See also ==
- List of table tennis players
