= Kiril Popov (mathematician) =

Bulgarian mathematician

- Born: 3 May 1880; Shumen, Bulgaria
- Died: 1 May 1966 (aged 85); Sofia, Bulgaria
- Education: Sorbonne University

Kiril Atanasov Popov (Кирил Атанасов Попов) (May 3, 1880 - May 1, 1966) was a Bulgarian mathematician who is best known for his contributions to the fields of ballistics and thermodynamics.

== Early life ==
Kiril Popov was born in Shumen, Bulgaria in 1880. His father, Atanas Popov, was a merchant who participated in the Bulgarian revolutionary movement in Tsargrad, where he was imprisoned for his activity against the Ottoman Empire. After the Liberation of Bulgaria, Atanas returned to his hometown Shumen, where he married Anastasia, the mother of Kiril. Kiril had three siblings: brothers Metodi and Kosta and sister Ekaterina. In 1885, the family moved to Varna, where Kiril and Metodi enrolled in a preschool. After a few days there, Kiril got bored and sneaked into the nearby school, where he stayed for the next four years until he finished his primary education. While in secondary school, Kiril became a proficient violin player and taught himself Russian and French.

== Education ==
After graduation from secondary school, Kiril taught for one year in the Varna primary school “Otets Paisiy” to save money for further education. In 1894 he enrolled in the Faculty of Physics and Mathematics in Sofia. A year later, he obtained a scholarship that enabled him to finance both his studies and the education of his brother, Metodi. After graduating, Kiril worked for two years as a teacher. During that time, he became interested in the works of Ernst Mach and Henri Poincarè.

In 1904, Popov was selected as an assistant in the Faculty of Physics and Mathematics in Sofia. In 1906 and 1907, Popov worked in the Munich, Heidelberg, and Nice observatories. At that time, he learned about the three-body problem and Poincare's contributions to perturbation theory which became the basis of his early research. J. A. L. Bassot, the Director General of the Nice observatory, recommended him as a candidate for further studies at the Sorbonne, and in 1908, he is accepted there without having to sit an entrance exam.

While at the Sorbonne, Popov worked at the Paris observatory and attended the lectures of Édouard Goursat, Émile Picard, and Henri Poincarè. He became enthralled by Poincarè's work on the motions of celestial bodies and started doctoral studies under the supervision of the French mathematician. While working on computations for the orbit of 108 Hecuba, Popov found a mistake in Poincarè's equations that lead to incorrect predictions. During his time as a doctoral student, Popov had the chance to work in the observatories in Greenwich, Strasbourg, and London. In 1909, he returned to his position as an assistant at Sofia University and spent the following two years writing his doctoral thesis, “Sur le mouvement de 108 Hecube”, which he defended at the Sorbonne in 1912. After the defense, Popov had to return to Bulgaria as he was drafted into the army at the start of the Balkan wars.

== Career ==
In 1914, Popov was selected as an associate professor in the Faculty of Physics and Mathematics in Sofia and became interested in ballistics. By 1917, he was granted the highest title in the Bulgarian Academy of Sciences: an academician. In 1920, after several successful works in the field, Popov was invited to give a lecture course on ballistics at the university in Berlin, where he met Richard von Mises. The course was developed into a book that was published with a preface by Èmile Picard. From 1925 onwards, Popov became a regular visitor to the Sorbonne and the university in Berlin, where he kept delivering lectures. In 1926, Popov received the Montyon Prize for his work on mechanics.

In his later years, Popov started working on thermodynamics. Between 1952 and 1958 he developed a series of 18 papers on the dynamics of irreversible processes, for which he was awarded the Henri de Parville Prize by the French Academy of Sciences.

== Later life and recognition ==
Kiril Popov continued remained active in the European mathematical scene until his death in 1966. During his lifetime, he published more than 150 scientific works for which he was honored with a variety of accolades. Posthumously, the Bulgarian mathematics competition “Academic Kiril Popov” and the mathematics high school in Plovdiv were named in his honor.

== Notable works ==
1. Sur le mouvement de 108 Hécube, 1912
2. Das Hauptproblem der äußeren Ballistik im Lichte der modernen Mathematik, Leipzig, Akademische Verlagsgesellschaft, 1932
3. Le mouvement d’un projectile autour de son centre de gravité, Mémorial des sciences mathématiques, 107, Paris, Gauthier-Villars, 1951
4. Les bases mathématiques de la théorie des processus thermodinamiques irréversibles, Mémorial des sciences physiques, 63, Paris, Gauthier-Villars, 1956

== Awards ==
1947: Elected academician of the Bulgarian Academy of Sciences

1926: Montion Prize, Académie des sciences

1957: Henri de Parville Prize, Académie des sciences

Dimitrovgrad Award (twice)

Bulgarian National Award
