= An Konishi =

Japanese table tennis player

Personal information
- Nationality: Japanese
- Born: 16 December 1980 (age 45)

Sport
- Sport: Table tennis

An Konishi (born 16 December 1980) is a Japanese table tennis player. She competed in the women's singles event at the 2000 Summer Olympics.
