= Kiril Popov (table tennis) =

Bulgarian table tennis player and coach

Kiril Nikolov Popov
Personal information
- Nationality: Bulgaria
- Born: 15 March 1985 (age 41) Stamboliyski, Plovdiv Province, Bulgaria

Sport
- Sport: Table tennis

Kiril Popov (Bulgarian: Кирил Попов; born 15 March 1985) is a Bulgarian table tennis player and coach. He is currently one of the highest ranked Bulgarians in table tennis and competes in the top table tennis division of the country. Popov is also a member of the Bulgarian national table tennis team.

== Biography ==
Popov's first coach was his father Nikola Popov and he began his career with "Vitamina 92" in Stamboliyski (where legendary Bulgarian players such as Mariano Lukov and Kostadin Lengerov had honed their skills). In 2006 Popov won the title at the U21 Balkaniad in Serbia. He has represented "Korabostroitel-92" from Varna, "Digesta" (Sofia) and also plied his trade in Turkey and Germany. At the 2015 Asarel Bulgaria Open Popov reached the 1/4 finals.
