= Manzura Inoyatova =

Uzbekistani table tennis player (born 1985)

Personal information
- Nationality: Uzbekistani
- Born: 12 February 1985 (age 40)

Sport
- Sport: Table tennis

Manzura Inoyatova (born 12 February 1985) is an Uzbekistani table tennis player. She competed in the women's singles event at the 2004 Summer Olympics.
