= Pan Li-chun =

Taiwanese table tennis player

Personal information
- Nationality: Republic of China
- Born: 26 February 1982 (age 44) Kaohsiung, Taiwan
- Height: 1.55 m (5 ft 1 in)
- Weight: 50 kg (110 lb)

Sport
- Sport: Table tennis
- Club: Taiwan Cooperative Bank
- Playing style: Right-handed, shakehand
- Equipment: DHS Hurricane
- Highest ranking: 105 (August 2008)
- Current ranking: 168 (July 2012)

Pan Li-chun (Chinese: 潘俐君; pinyin: Pān Lìchūn; born 26 February 1982 in Kaohsiung) is a Taiwanese table tennis player. As of July 2012, Pan is ranked no. 168 in the world by the International Table Tennis Federation (ITTF). Pan is a member of the table tennis team for Taiwan Cooperative Bank, and is coached and trained by Hsu Long-Chien. Pan is also right-handed, and uses the shakehand grip.

Pan represented the Chinese Taipei at the 2008 Summer Olympics in Beijing, where she competed in the women's singles. She defeated Egypt's Shaimaa Abdul-Aziz in the unseeded preliminary round, before losing out the first round match to Turkey's Melek Hu, with a set score of 1–4.
