= Mariana Sahakian =

Lebanese table tennis player (born 1977)

- Native name: Մարիանա Սահակյան ماريانا ساهاكيان
- Nationality: Soviet (former), Armenian, Lebanese (current)
- Born: 2 September 1977 (age 47); Armenian SSR, Soviet Union

Mariana Sahakian (Armenian: Մարիանա Սահակյան; Arabic: ماريانا ساهاكيان; born 2 September 1977) is a table tennis player. Born in Armenia, she represents Lebanon internationally. She competed at the 2016 Summer Olympics in the women's singles event, in which she was eliminated in the preliminary round by Nigerian Olufunke Oshonaike.

In 2024, in the Paris Olympics, she won her first round match-up against Zhiying Zeng from Chile.
