= Saki Kanazawa =

Japanese table tennis player

Personal information
- Nationality: Japanese
- Born: 17 September 1976 (age 49)

Sport
- Sport: Table tennis

Saki Kanazawa (born 17 September 1976) is a Japanese table tennis player. Her highest career ITTF ranking was 23.
