= Chen Qing =

Chinese table tennis player

Personal information
- Nationality: Chinese
- Born: 15 January 1984 (age 41)

Sport
- Sport: Table tennis

Chen Qing (born 15 January 1984) is a Chinese table tennis player. Her highest career ITTF ranking was 37.
