= Kwak Bang-bang =

Hong Kong-South Korean table tennis player

Personal information
- Born: February 6, 1980 (age 46) Xuzhou, China

Sport
- Sport: Table tennis
Medal record
Representing Hong Kong
Asian Championships
Silver medal – second place	2003 Bangkok	Team
Bronze medal – third place	2000 Doha	Team
Bronze medal – third place	2000 Doha	Doubles
Representing South Korea
Asian Games
Bronze medal – third place	2006 Doha	Team
Asian Championships
Gold medal – first place	2007 Yangzhou	Mixed doubles

Kwak Bang-bang (Korean: 곽방방; Hanja: 郭芳芳; RR: Gwak Bang-bang, born February 6, 1980, in Xuzhou) is a retired Hong Kong-South Korean table tennis player. Born as Guo Fangfang in China, she played on the Hong Kong national team as Kwok Fong Fong from 2000 to 2005, and on the South Korea national team as Kwak Bang-bang from 2005 to 2008.

She helped Hong Kong win two bronze medals at the 2000 Asian Table Tennis Championships, including the women's doubles bronze with Song Ah Sim.

She helped South Korea win a bronze medal at the 2006 Asian Games. At the 2007 Asian Table Tennis Championships she won the mixed doubles gold medal with Oh Sang-eun.
