= Ai Fukuhara =

Japanese table tennis player (born 1988)

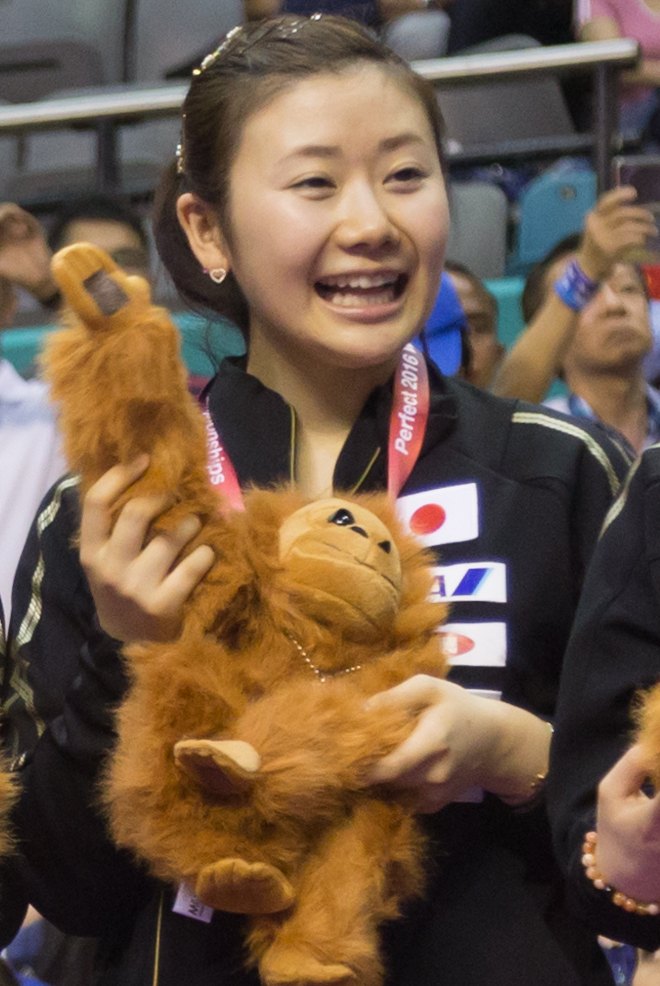
- Fukuhara at the 2016 World Team Table Tennis Championships

Personal information
- Nickname: Ai-chan
- Born: 1 November 1988 (age 37) Sendai, Japan
- Height: 155 cm (5 ft 1 in)

Sport
- Sport: Table tennis
- Playing style: Right-handed, shakehand grip
- Highest ranking: 4 (October 2015)
Medal record
Women's table tennis
Representing Japan
Olympic Games
Silver medal – second place	2012 London	Team
Bronze medal – third place	2016 Rio de Janeiro	Team
World Championships
Silver medal – second place	2016 Kuala Lumpur	Team
Bronze medal – third place	2004 Doha	Team
Bronze medal – third place	2006 Bremen	Team
Bronze medal – third place	2008 Guangzhou	Team
Bronze medal – third place	2010 Moscow	Team
Bronze medal – third place	2011 Rotterdam	Mixed doubles
Asian Games
Silver medal – second place	2014 Incheon	Team
Bronze medal – third place	2002 Busan	Team
Bronze medal – third place	2010 Guangzhou	Singles
Bronze medal – third place	2010 Guangzhou	Doubles
Bronze medal – third place	2010 Guangzhou	Mixed doubles
Bronze medal – third place	2014 Incheon	Mixed doubles
Asian Championships
Silver medal – second place	2003 Bangkok	Doubles
Bronze medal – third place	2005 Jeju-do	Doubles
Bronze medal – third place	2009 Lucknow	Mixed doubles
Bronze medal – third place	2012 Macau	Team
Bronze medal – third place	2013 Busan	Team

Ai Fukuhara (福原 愛, Fukuhara Ai; born 1 November 1988) is a retired Japanese table tennis player and Olympic medalist, winning silver at the 2012 Summer Olympics and bronze at the 2016 Summer Olympics with the Japanese women's team. She is sponsored by All Nippon Airways.

== Table tennis career ==
Fukuhara began playing at the age of 3 and became a professional at age 10. The following year, she became the youngest player ever to become a member of the Japanese national team. Because of her age, she has been regarded as a "child prodigy" in table tennis. At age 13, in 2002, she became the youngest-ever Japanese representative for the Asian Games. In 2003, she reached the quarter-final, losing to top-seeded Zhang Yining, in her World Championships debut in Paris. In 2004, she took part in the World Team Championships and helped Team Japan finish third.

=== Olympic participation ===
Fukuhara qualified to participate in the 2004 Summer Olympics in the Asian zone qualifying tournament. The qualification entitled Fukuhara to compete in Athens, at the age of 15 years and 287 days, as the youngest-ever female table tennis player to debut in the Olympic Games. She reached the round of 16 in her first Olympic Games, losing to bronze medalist Kim Kyung-Ah.

Round	Result	Opponent's country	Opponent	Score	By match
1st	Bye
2nd	W	Australia	Miao Miao	4–3	5–11	7–11	11–9	11–6	11–6	9–11	11–9
3rd	W	United States	Gao Jun	4–0	11–3	11–6	11–8	11–9
4th	L	South Korea	Kim Kyung-Ah	1–4	8–11	5–11	11–7	13–15	6–11

In April 2005, Fukuhara replaced compatriot Aya Umemura and became the highest-ranked Japanese female on the ITTF World Ranking list. She advanced to the semifinals at the 2005 Women's World Cup, losing to Guo Yan in the semifinals but beating Tie Ya Na in the third place match.

Fukuhara was directly qualified for the 2008 Summer Olympics through world ranking. She was chosen as the national flag bearer for Japan at the Olympic Games in Beijing, China. Fukuhara teamed up with Sayaka Hirano and Haruna Fukuoka at the women's team event. They reached the bronze medal contest but lost to South Korea. In the singles event, Fukuhara advanced to round of 16, losing to gold medalist Zhang Yining.

She also qualified directly for the London 2012 Olympic Games with her world ranking in June 2011, but lost to Ding Ning on 31 July 2012, (13–15, 6–11, 6–11, and 4–11). At the Women's Team Event semi-finals, she defeated Feng Tianwei (11–9, 11–6, 5–11 and 11–9) in the first match which eventually helped Japan reach their first table tennis finals in the Olympics over Singapore. However, Japan failed to defeat China in the finals but Fukuhara got her first silver medal ever in table tennis.

Fukuhara also qualified for the 2016 Summer Olympics in Rio de Janeiro, where she lost a close semi-final against Germany with her team and later won bronze together with Kasumi Ishikawa and Mima Ito on her side by defeating the team from Singapore. She was also playing for Japan in the Singles event and reached 4th place after losing against Li Xiaoxia and losing in the game for bronze against Kim Song-i.

=== Hong Kong 2009 East Asian Games ===
Ai Fukuhara won Table Tennis Women's Doubles with Kasumi Ishikawa.

=== ITTF Kuwait Open 2010 ===
The Kuwait Open 2010 would be Ai's most fruitful competition at that time. On the way to the finals, she caused numerous upsets. Starting off, she upset China by defeating Guo Yue. Later on, she played Singapore's Wang Yuegu, where Ai eventually won 4–2. After two shocking wins, Ai went on to cause another upset to China by beating the experienced top-spin specialist, Guo Yan. In the highly lauded and suspenseful final, she nearly defeated China's top seed Liu Shiwen, but lost 3–4.

=== ITTF Japan Open 2013 ===
Fukuhara, who at that time was world number 15, beat two highly rated Chinese opponents on the way to the final before eventually overcoming Moon Hyunjung (KOR) 11–7, 11–5, 13–11, 11–8 to clinch the 2013 Japan Open title. "This is the first time I won the Japan Open, an event which is very special to me. I am very happy to win such a big event in front of so many people. The reason that I won today was the spectators, especially the ones that have followed my whole career."

=== Retirement ===
Fukuhara announced her retirement in October 2018.

Fukahara called Ding Ning her role model in a heartfelt social media post following Ding's announced retirement in 2021.

== Popularity ==
Her first name, Ai, means "love" and she is often referred to as "Ai-chan" (愛ちゃん) in Japan. Her youth and talent have made her a popular sports star in Japan. Fukuhara has appeared in two Japanese table tennis video games, including Ikuze! Onsen Takkyū!! (Do it! Hot Spring Table Tennis!!), released on 21 December 2001 and Fukuhara Ai No Takkyū Icchokusen (Ai Fukuhara's Table Tennis), released on 24 June 2004, both for the PlayStation 2. She carried the Olympic flame when it traveled to Tokyo in 2004. She carried the torch once again for the Beijing Olympic Games in 2008, and was the flag bearer for the Japanese national team at the Opening Ceremonies.

Since she has been playing table tennis in China from a very young age, Fukuhara can speak fluent Mandarin Chinese with a Northeastern accent. Therefore, she has greater popularity in China than any other table tennis players from outside of China. In an incident widely reported by the Chinese media, she wrote down "中日友好" (meaning "Sino-Japanese friendship" in both Chinese and Japanese) when meeting Wang Yi, then Chinese ambassador to Japan (now the director of Office of the Central Foreign Affairs Commission), at the height of the 2005 anti-Japanese demonstrations.

In July 2005, Fukuhara guest-starred alongside Chinese actor Jackie Chan during the opening of a photograph exhibition, in Roppongi Hills, to celebrate 60 years of peaceful coexistence between China and Japan. During CCP general secretary Hu Jintao's visit to Japan in 2008, Hu played table tennis with Fukuhara at Waseda University.

== Personal life ==
Fukuhara attended Aomori Yamada Junior High School and graduated from Aomori Yamada High School in 2007. Both schools are located in the city of Aomori in Aomori Prefecture. In 2007, she enrolled in Waseda University's sports science department; she decided to drop out in 2010 to focus on her table tennis competitions.

As a teenager, Fukuhara trained with the China national table tennis team and competed as a foreign recruit for Liaoning in the China Table Tennis Super League, and is close friends with world champions such as Wang Nan and Guo Yue. She is fluent in Mandarin and speaks with a distinctly Northeastern accent, as a result of her time in Liaoning and her close relationship with personal coach Tang Yuanyuan (who was a Fushun native). She has been a well-loved sport celebrity among Chinese players and fans, who often affectionately call her "Ai-chan" (爱酱).

Fukuhara married Taiwanese table tennis player Chiang Hung-chieh in 2016 following the Rio Olympics. She gave birth to their daughter in 2017. Their marriage life was the subject of a Chinese reality show. Fukuhara gave birth to a boy in 2019. In March 2021, Fukuhara and Chiang filed for divorce. According to Japanese media, Chiang criticized her spending on fashion and insulted her, while Fukuhara was seen being intimate with a married man. Following the divorce, Fukuhara took their son back to Japan and cut off Chiang from access to him. Chiang filed multiple cases requesting access but Fukuhara ignored the court order. The two eventually reached a settlement over child custody in 2024. Fukuhara also began dating the man she was seen intimate with after both she and the man divorced their respective spouses. The two married in 2025 and she gave birth to a third child.

Olympic Games
Preceded by Kyoko Hamaguchi	Flagbearer for Japan; Beijing 2008	Succeeded by Saori Yoshida
