= Kim Kyung-ah =

South Korean table tennis player (born 1977)

Kim Kyungah
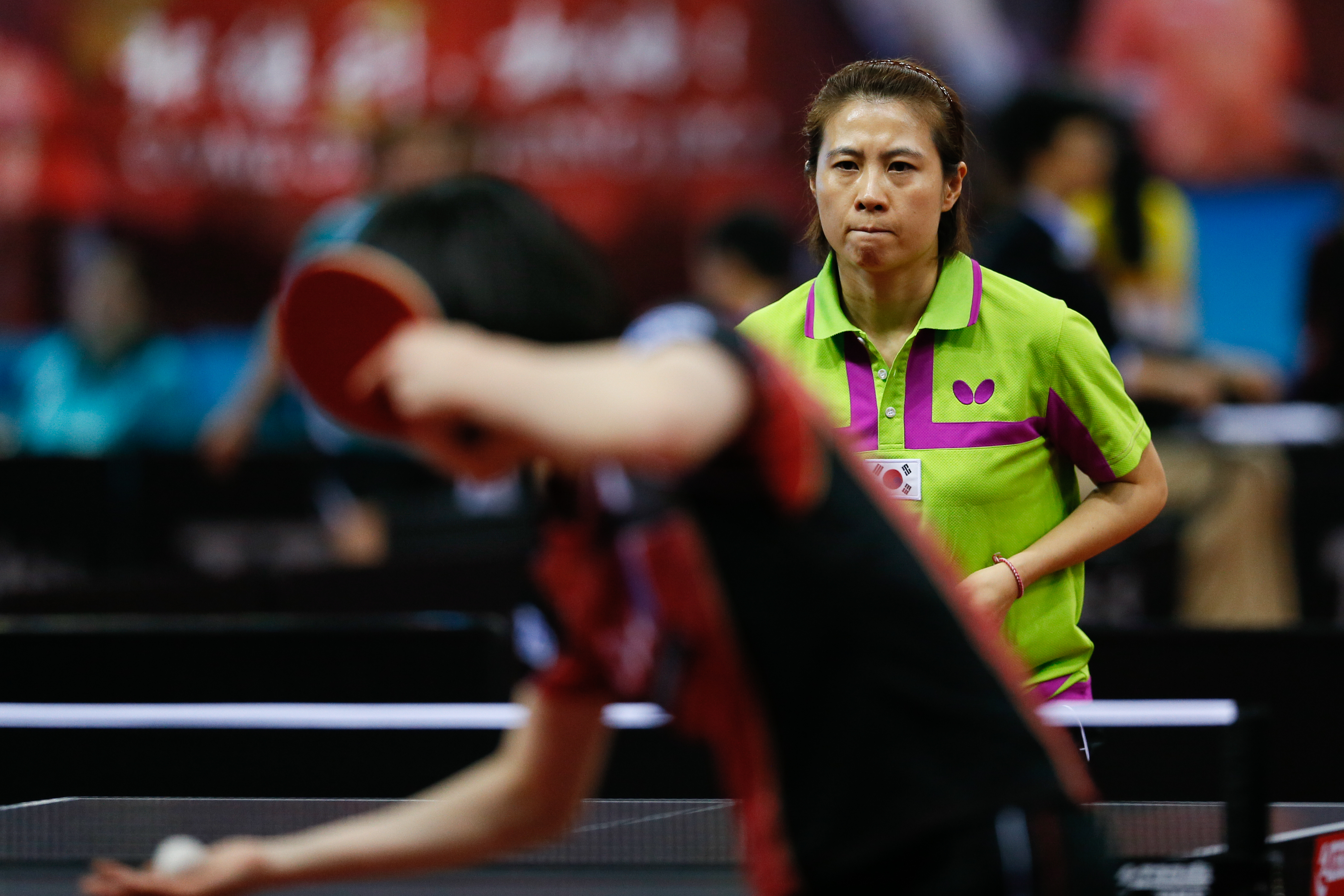

Personal information
- Full name: Kim Kyungah
- Nationality: South Korea
- Born: 25 May 1977 (age 49) Daejeon, South Korea
- Height: 1.65 m (5 ft 5 in)

Sport
- Sport: Table tennis
- Playing style: Right-handed, shakehand grip
- Highest ranking: 4 (Aug – Oct 2010)
Medal record
Women's table tennis
Representing South Korea
Olympic Games
Bronze medal – third place	2004 Athens	Singles
Bronze medal – third place	2008 Beijing	Team
World Championships
Bronze medal – third place	2007 Zagreb	Doubles
Bronze medal – third place	2009 Yokohama	Doubles
Bronze medal – third place	2011 Rotterdam	Doubles
Bronze medal – third place	2012 Dortmund	Team
Asian Games
Bronze medal – third place	2006 Doha	Team
Bronze medal – third place	2006 Doha	Mixed Doubles
Bronze medal – third place	2010 Guangzhou	Singles
Bronze medal – third place	2010 Guangzhou	Team

- Korean name
- Hangul: 김경아
- Hanja: 金暻娥
- RR: Gim Gyeonga
- MR: Kim Kyŏnga

Kim Kyungah (Korean pronunciation: [kim.ɡjʌŋ.a]; born May 25, 1977, in Daejeon, South Korea) is a South Korean table tennis player. She was the bronze medalist in women's singles at 2004 Athens Olympics. She was 6th in the ITTF world ranking as of March 2013.

In May 2011, Kim qualified for the 2012 Summer Olympics. She was eliminated in the quarter-finals as a single player. Her team made it to the bronze medal match, but was defeated by the Singaporean team.

== Career records ==
=== Olympic Games ===
Competition	Year	Location	Country	Singles	Doubles	Mixed	Team
Olympic Games	2012	London	England	QF			4th Place
Olympic Games	2008	Beijing	China	Round of 16			3rd Place
Olympic Games	2004	Athens	Greece	3rd Place	4th Place		

=== World Championship ===
Competition	Year	Location	Country	Singles	Doubles	Mixed	Team
World Championship	2012	Dortmund	Germany				3rd Place
World Championship	2011	Rotterdam	Netherlands	Round of 32	SF		
World Championship	2010	Moscow	Russia				5th Place
World Championship	2009	Yokohama	Japan	Round of 32	SF		
World Championship	2007	Zagreb	Croatia	QF	SF		
World Championship	2006	Bremen	Germany				5th Place
World Championship	2005	Shanghai	China	Round of 32	Round of 16	Round of 32	
World Championship	2004	Doha	Qatar				4th Place
World Championship	2003	Paris	France	Round of 16		Round of 16	

=== Asian Games ===
Competition	Year	Location	Country	Singles	Doubles	Mixed	Team
Asian Games	2010	Guangzhou	China	SF	QF		
Asian Games	2006	Doha	Qatar	QF	QF	SF	

=== World Cup ===
Competition	Year	Location	Country	Singles	Doubles	Mixed	Team
World Cup	2011	Singapore	Singapore	5-8th Places			
World Cup	2010	Kuala Lumpur	Malaysia	5-8th Places			
World Cup	2009	Guangzhou	China	5-8th Places			
World Cup	2008	Kuala Lumpur	Malaysia	5-8th Places			
World Cup	2006	Ürümqi	China	5-8th Places			
World Cup	2005	Guangzhou	China	9-12th Places			
World Cup	2004	Hangzhou	China	5-8th Places			
World Cup	2003	Hong Kong	Hong Kong	5-8th Places			

=== World Tour ===
Competition	Year	Location	Country	Singles	Doubles	Mixed	Team
World Tour Grand Finals	2012	Hangzhou	China	Round of 16	QF		
World Tour	2012	Santos	Brazil	Winner			
World Tour	2012	Kobe	Japan	Runner-up			
World Tour	2012	Shanghai	China	Round of 16	SF		
World Tour	2012	Incheon	Korea Republic	Round of 16	QF		
World Tour	2012	Santiago	Chile	Winner			
World Tour	2012	Alemria	Spain	Winner	Winner		
World Tour	2012	Kuwait City	Kuwait	Runner-up	Round of 16		
World Tour	2012	Doha	Qatar	QF	QF		
Pro Tour	2011	Incheon	Korea Republic	Round of 16	Runner-up		
Pro Tour	2011	Almeria	Spain	Round of 32	QF		
Pro Tour	2011	Dortmund	Germany	Round of 16			
Pro Tour	2011	Dubai	United Arab Emirates	QF			
Pro Tour	2011	Doha	Qatar	QF			
Pro Tour	2011	Sheffield	England	Round of 16			
Pro Tour	2011	Velenje	Slovenia	Round of 32			
Pro Tour Grand Finals	2010	Seoul	Korea Republic	Round of 16	Winner		
Pro Tour	2010	Suzhou	China	Runner-up	Round of 16		
Pro Tour	2010	Incheon	Korea Republic	Round of 16	Winner		
Pro Tour	2010	Kobe	Japan	SF	SF		
Pro Tour	2010	Berlin	Germany	QF			
Pro Tour	2010	Kuwait City	Kuwait	Round of 16	SF		
Pro Tour	2010	Doha	Qatar	QF	Runner-up		
Pro Tour Grand Finals	2009	Macao	Macao	SF	QF		
Pro Tour	2009	Warsaw	Poland	Round of 32	QF		
Pro Tour	2009	Sheffield	England	SF	Winner		
Pro Tour	2009	Seoul	Korea Republic	QF	Winner		
Pro Tour	2009	Suzhou	China	SF	SF		
Pro Tour	2009	Frederikshavn	Denmark	Runner-up			
Pro Tour	2009	Velenje	Slovenia	QF	Runner-up		
Pro Tour Grand Finals	2008	Macao	Macao	QF	Runner-up		
Pro Tour	2008	Singapore	Singapore	QF	SF		
Pro Tour	2008	Daejeon	Korea Republic	Round of 32	QF		
Pro Tour	2008	Yokohama	Japan	Round of 16			3rd Place
Pro Tour	2008	Changchun	China	Round of 16			2nd Place
Pro Tour	2008	Santiago	Chile	Runner-up	SF		
Pro Tour	2008	Belo Horizonte	Brazil	QF	Winner		
Pro Tour	2008	Doha	Qatar	Round of 32	Runner-up		
Pro Tour	2008	Kuwait City	Kuwait	Round of 32	Round of 16		
Pro Tour Grand Finals	2007	Beijing	China		Runner-up		
Pro Tour	2007	Stockholm	Sweden	Round of 32	Winner		
Pro Tour	2007	Bremen	Germany	Round of 16	Runner-up		
Pro Tour	2007	Toulouse	France	Round of 32	QF		
Pro Tour	2007	Taipei	Chinese Taipei	QF	QF		
Pro Tour	2007	Chiba	Japan	Round of 64	Runner-up		
Pro Tour	2007	Seongnam	Korea Republic	SF	QF		
Pro Tour	2007	Kuwait City	Kuwait	Round of 16	SF		
Pro Tour	2007	Doha	Qatar	Round of 16			
Pro Tour	2006	Guangzhou	China	Round of 16	SF		
Pro Tour	2006	Singapore	Singapore	SF	Round of 16		
Pro Tour	2006	Jeonju	Korea Republic	SF	SF		
Pro Tour Grand Finals	2005	Fuzhou	China	QF	Runner-up		
Pro Tour	2005	Gothenburg	Sweden	Round of 32	QF		
Pro Tour	2005	Magdeburg	Germany	SF	Runner-up		
Pro Tour	2005	Yokohama	Japan	QF	Runner-up		
Pro Tour	2005	Fort Lauderdale	USA	Round of 32	QF		
Pro Tour	2005	Santiago	Chile	Winner	Round of 16		
Pro Tour	2005	Rio de Janeiro	Brazil	Winner	QF		
Pro Tour	2005	Suncheon	Korea Republic	Winner	Round of 16		
Pro Tour	2005	Doha	Qatar	QF			
Pro Tour Grand Finals	2004	Beijing	China	QF			
Pro Tour	2004	St. Petersburg	Russia	Runner-up	QF		
Pro Tour	2004	Wels	Austria	Round of 64			
Pro Tour	2004	Kobe	Japan	QF	QF		
Pro Tour	2004	Zagreb	Croatia	Winner			
Pro Tour	2004	Chicago	USA	SF	SF		
Pro Tour	2004	Singapore	Singapore	QF			
Pro Tour	2004	Pyeongchang	Korea Republic	Round of 16	QF		
Pro Tour	2004	Cairo	Egypt	QF	QF		
Pro Tour	2004	Athens	Greece	QF	Round of 16		
Pro Tour Grand Finals	2003	Guangzhou	China	Round of 16			
Pro Tour	2003	Aarhus	Denmark	Round of 16	QF		
Pro Tour	2003	Bremen	Germany	Round of 16	Round of 16		
Pro Tour	2003	Kobe	Japan	Round of 16			
Pro Tour	2003	Guangzhou	China	Round of 16	Round of 16		
Pro Tour	2003	Jeju	Korea Republic	QF	Round of 16		
Pro Tour	2003	Rio de Janeiro	Brazil	SF			
Pro Tour	2003	Zagreb	Croatia	Round of 16			
Pro Tour	2002	Farum	Denmark	Round of 16	Round of 16		
Pro Tour	2002	Kobe	Japan	Winner	Runner-up		
Pro Tour	2002	Gangneung	Korea Republic	QF	QF		
Pro Tour	2002	Qingdao	China	Round of 16	SF		
Pro Tour Grand Finals	2001	Hainan	China	QF	QF		
Pro Tour	2001	Bayreuth	Germany	QF	Winner		
Pro Tour	2001	Yokohama	Japan	Runner-up	Winner		
Pro Tour	2001	Seoul	Korea Republic	QF	Round of 16		
Pro Tour	2001	Rotterdam	Netherlands	Round of 32	SF		
Pro Tour	2000	Rio de Janeiro	Brazil	Round of 32	Round of 16		
Pro Tour	2000	Kobe	Japan	Round of 16			
Pro Tour	2000	Warsaw	Poland	Round 1			
Pro Tour	2000	Umea	Sweden	Round of 32	Round 1		
Pro Tour	2000	Fort Lauderdale	USA	Round of 32	Round of 16		
Pro Tour	1998	Sundsvall	Sweden	QF	QF		
Pro Tour	1998	Belgrade	Yugoslavia	Round of 16	QF		
Pro Tour	1997	Belgrade	Yugoslavia	Round of 32	Round of 16		

=== World Team Cup ===
Competition	Year	Location	Country	Singles	Doubles	Mixed	Team
World Team Cup	2010	Dubai	United Arab Emirates				3rd Place
World Team Cup	2007	Magdeburg	Germany				2nd Place

=== Asian Championship ===
Competition	Year	Location	Country	Singles	Doubles	Mixed	Team
Asian Championship	2009	Lucknow	India	QF	Runner-up		
Asian Championship	2007	Yangzhou	China	QF	QF		
Asian Championship	2005	Jeju	Korea Republic	QF	QF		
Asian Championship	2003	Bangkok	Thailand	QF	QF		

=== Asian Cup ===
Competition	Year	Location	Country	Singles	Doubles	Mixed	Team
Asian Cup	2003	Kitakyushu	Japan	6th Place			
