= Lin Ling =

Chinese table tennis player

Personal information
- Nationality: Chinese
- Born: 9 September 1977 (age 48) Fuzhou, China

Sport
- Sport: Table tennis
Medal record
Women's table tennis
Representing Hong Kong
World Championships
Silver medal – second place	2006 Bremen	Team
Bronze medal – third place	2005 Shanghai	Singles
Bronze medal – third place	2008 Guangzhou	Team
World Cup
Bronze medal – third place	2007 Magdeburg	Team
Bronze medal – third place	2009 Linz	Singles
Asian Championships
Gold medal – first place	2005 Jeju-do	Singles
Gold medal – first place	2005 Jeju-do	Team
Representing China
World Championships
Silver medal – second place	2001 Osaka	Singles
Asian Championships
Gold medal – first place	2000 Doha	Singles
Gold medal – first place	2000 Doha	Team

Lin Ling (Chinese: 林菱; pinyin: Lín Líng; Jyutping: lam^{4} ling^{4}; born 9 September 1977) is a table tennis player from China. She started competing for Hong Kong in 2002. Since 2000, she has won several medals in singles, doubles, and team events in the Asian Table Tennis Championships, the Table Tennis World Cup, and the World Table Tennis Championships.

== See also ==
- List of table tennis players
