= Mohammed Bin Hamad Al-Hitmi Hall =

Stadium in Doha, Qatar

Mohammed Bin Hamad Indoor Hall صالة محمد بن حمد الهتمي
- Al-Arabi Hall
- Interactive map of Mohammed Bin Hamad Indoor Hall صالة محمد بن حمد الهتمي
- Full name: Mohammed Bin Hamad AlHitmi
- Location: Doha, Qatar
- Coordinates: 25°15′31″N 51°31′19″E
- Owner: Al-Arabi Sport Club
- Capacity: 2,000

Tenant
- Al-Arabi SC

Mohammed Bin Hamad Indoor Hall (Arabic: صالة محمد بن حمد الهتمي), also known as the Al-Arabi Sports Club Hall, is a multi-purpose Hall in Doha, Qatar. It is currently used mostly for volleyball and basketball matches. The volleyball, basketball, futsal, and handball teams of Al-Arabi SC play there. The stadium has a seating capacity of 2,000 people. The hall served as one of the two venues for the 2013–14 Qatari Volleyball League season.

== Events hosted ==
The stadium was used as the main venue for table tennis during the 2006 Asian Games. It was also used as a training facility during the 2009 FIVB Volleyball Men's Club World Championship. The inaugural edition of the Qatar Volleyball Super Cup took place in the stadium in December 2014. In July 2015, the venue hosted the Senior International Men’s Friendly volleyball tournament. The tournament featured Qatar, India, Cameroon and Egypt.
