= Huang Yi-hua =

Taiwanese table tennis player

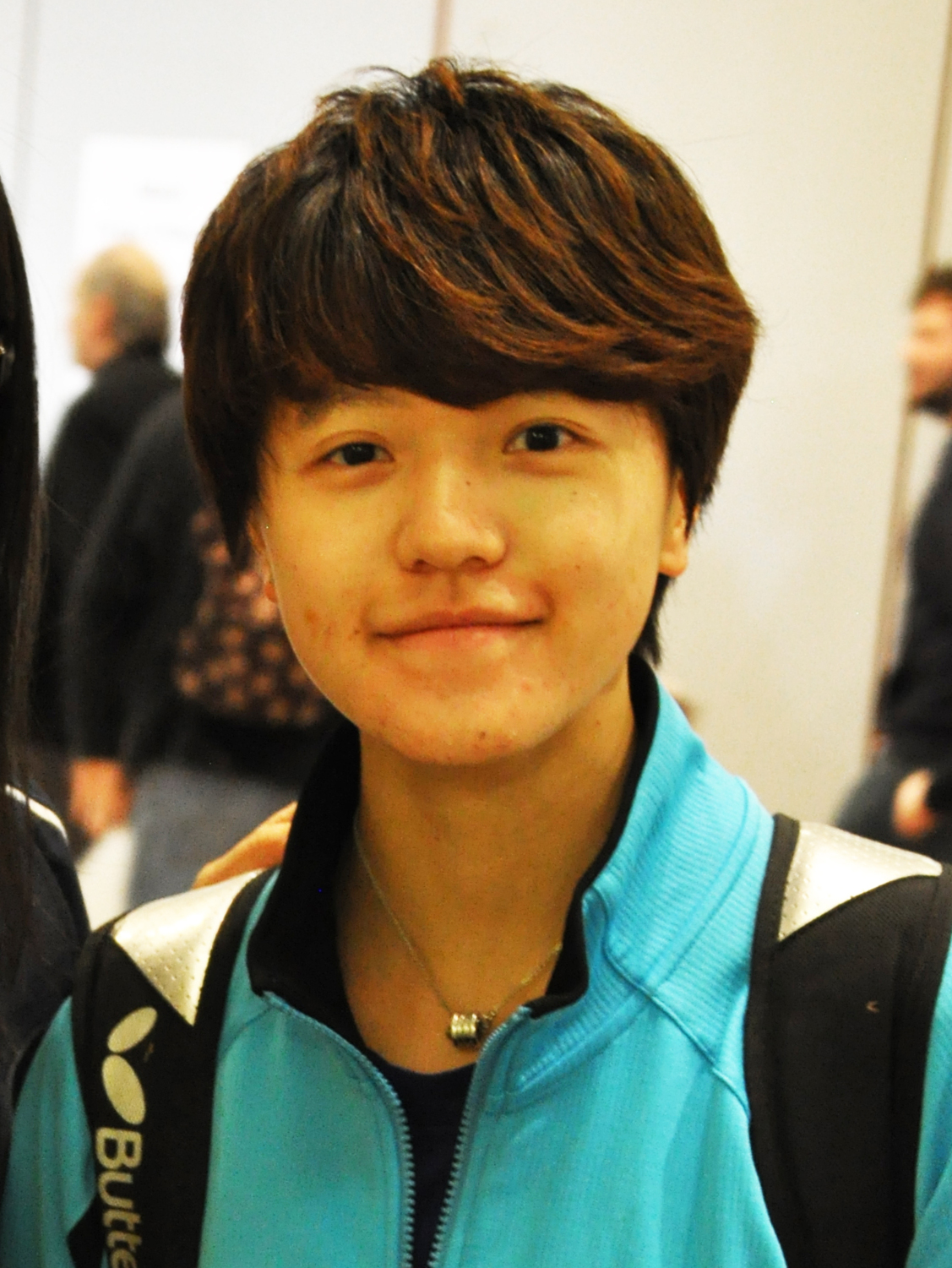

Personal information
- Nationality: Taiwanese
- Born: 20 July 1984 (age 42) Tainan, Taiwan
- Height: 167 cm (5 ft 5 1/2 in)

Sport
- Sport: Table tennis
- Playing style: Right-handed, shakehand grip
- Highest ranking: 17 (March 2011)
- Current ranking: 35 (15 July 2025)
Medal record
Women's table tennis
Representing Chinese Taipei
World Championships
Bronze medal – third place	2022 Chengdu	Team
Asian Games
Bronze medal – third place	2006 Doha	Doubles

Huang Yi-hua (Chinese: 黃怡樺; pinyin: Huáng Yíhuà; born 20 July 1984) is a Taiwanese table tennis player.

== Career records ==
Singles

- Olympics: round of 32 (2012).
- World Championships: round of 32 (2009, 2013).
- World Cup appearances: 1. Record: 9-12th (2010).
- Asian Games: round of 16 (2002, 2006, 2010).
- Asian Championships: round of 16 (2003, 05).
- Asian Cup: 5th (2010).

Women's doubles

- Olympics: round of 16 (2004).
- World Championships: round of 16 (2003, 05, 11, 13).
- Pro Tour winner (2): India Open 2010, Poland Open 2012. Runner-up (5): Japan Open 2010, 2013; China Open 2011, 2014; UAE Open 2013.
- Pro Tour Grand Finals appearances: 7. Record: Runner-up (1): 2012
- Asian Games: SF (2006).

Mixed doubles

- World Championships: QF (2013).
- Asian Championships: QF (2009).

Team

- World Championships: SF (2022).
