= Kim Mi-yong =

North Korean table tennis player (born 1983)

Kim Mi-Yong
Personal information
- Nationality: North Korea
- Born: 6 May 1983 (age 43) Nampo, Pyeongannam, North Korea
- Height: 1.56 m (5 ft 1 1/2 in)
- Weight: 55 kg (121 lb)

Sport
- Sport: Table tennis
- Club: Abrokkang Sports Club
- Playing style: Left-handed, classic
- Equipment: Butterfly
- Highest ranking: 60 (May 2006)
- Current ranking: 84 (January 2010)
Medal record
Women's table tennis
Representing North Korea
Asian Games
Gold medal – first place	2002 Busan	Team
World Championships
Silver medal – second place	2001 Osaka	Team

Kim Mi-Yong (Korean: 김미영; born 6 May 1983) is a North Korean table tennis player. He was born in Nampo, South Pyongan Province. She won a gold medal, as a member of the North Korea table tennis team, at the 2002 Asian Games in Busan, South Korea, and silver at the 2001 World Table Tennis Championships in Osaka, Japan. As of January 2010, Kim is ranked no. 84 in the world by the International Table Tennis Federation (ITTF). Kim is a member of the table tennis team for Abrokkang Sports Club, and is coached and trained by Ri To Yong. She is also left-handed, and uses the offensive, classic grip.

Kim qualified for the women's singles tournament, along with her teammate Kim Jong at the 2008 Summer Olympics in Beijing, by receiving a place as one of the top 7 seeded players from the Asian Qualification Tournament in Hong Kong. She received a single bye for the first round match, before losing out to Lithuania's Rūta Paškauskienė, with a set score of 3–4.
