= Lu Yun-feng =

Taiwanese table tennis player

Personal information
- Nationality: Taiwanese
- Born: 16 January 1984 (age 41)

Sport
- Sport: Table tennis

Lu Yun-feng (born 16 January 1984) is a Taiwanese table tennis player.

She competed in women's doubles at the 2004 Summer Olympics in Athens.
