= Ma Long =

Chinese table tennis player (born 1988)

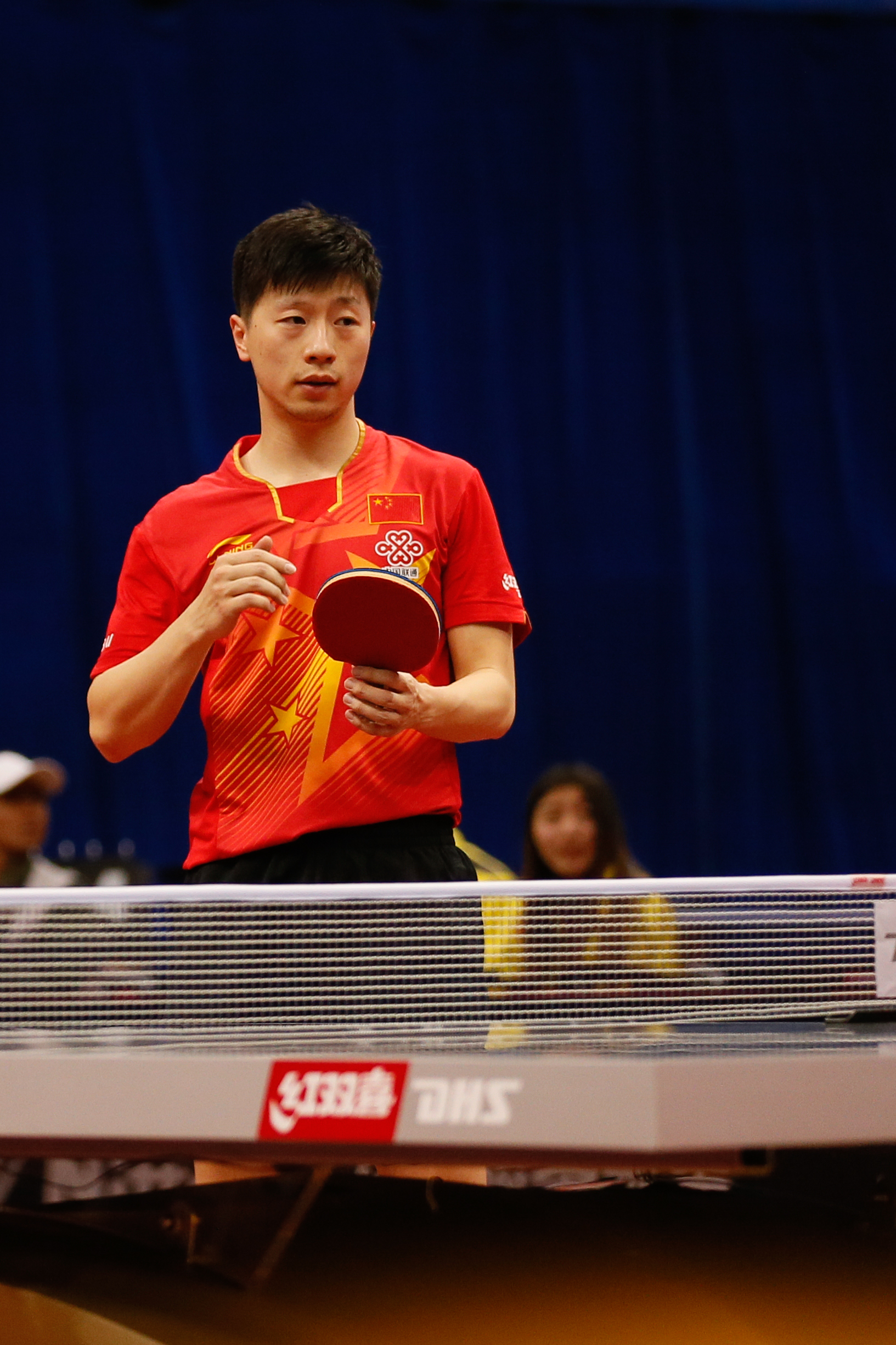
- Ma at the 2017 Asian Championships

Personal information
- Native name: 马龙
- Nicknames: The Hexagon Warrior; The Dictator; Captain Long; The Dragon
- Born: 20 October 1988 (age 38) Anshan, China
- Height: 1.75 m (5 ft 9 in)
- Weight: 72 kg (159 lb)

Sport
- Sport: Table tennis
- Club: Shandong Luneng
- Playing style: Right-handed, shakehand grip
- Equipment: (2023) DHS W968, DHS Hurricane 3 Neo National Blue Sponge (FH, Black), Customized DHS Hurricane 3 Neo (BH, Red)
- Highest ranking: 1 (January 2010)
Medal record
Event	1st	2nd	3rd
Olympic Games	6	0	0
World Championships	14	1	4
World Cup	11	2	3
Total	31	3	7
Men's table tennis
Representing China
Olympic Games
Gold medal – first place	2012 London	Team
Gold medal – first place	2016 Rio de Janeiro	Singles
Gold medal – first place	2016 Rio de Janeiro	Team
Gold medal – first place	2020 Tokyo	Singles
Gold medal – first place	2020 Tokyo	Team
Gold medal – first place	2024 Paris	Team
World Championships
Gold medal – first place	2006 Bremen	Team
Gold medal – first place	2008 Guangzhou	Team
Gold medal – first place	2010 Moscow	Team
Gold medal – first place	2011 Rotterdam	Doubles
Gold medal – first place	2012 Dortmund	Team
Gold medal – first place	2014 Tokyo	Team
Gold medal – first place	2015 Suzhou	Singles
Gold medal – first place	2016 Kuala Lumpur	Team
Gold medal – first place	2017 Düsseldorf	Singles
Gold medal – first place	2018 Halmstad	Team
Gold medal – first place	2019 Budapest	Singles
Gold medal – first place	2019 Budapest	Doubles
Gold medal – first place	2022 Chengdu	Team
Gold medal – first place	2024 Busan	Team
Silver medal – second place	2009 Yokohama	Doubles
Bronze medal – third place	2009 Yokohama	Singles
Bronze medal – third place	2011 Rotterdam	Singles
Bronze medal – third place	2013 Paris	Singles
Bronze medal – third place	2023 Durban	Singles
World Cup
Gold medal – first place	2009 Linz	Team
Gold medal – first place	2010 Dubai	Team
Gold medal – first place	2011 Magdeburg	Team
Gold medal – first place	2012 Liverpool	Singles
Gold medal – first place	2013 Guangzhou	Team
Gold medal – first place	2015 Halmstad	Singles
Gold medal – first place	2015 Dubai	Team
Gold medal – first place	2018 London	Team
Gold medal – first place	2019 Tokyo	Team
Gold medal – first place	2023 Chengdu	Mixed team
Gold medal – first place	2024 Macau	Singles
Silver medal – second place	2014 Düsseldorf	Singles
Silver medal – second place	2020 Weihai	Singles
Bronze medal – third place	2008 Liège	Singles
Bronze medal – third place	2009 Moscow	Singles
Bronze medal – third place	2017 Liège	Singles
Asian Games
Gold medal – first place	2006 Doha	Team
Gold medal – first place	2010 Guangzhou	Singles
Gold medal – first place	2010 Guangzhou	Team
Gold medal – first place	2014 Incheon	Doubles
Gold medal – first place	2014 Incheon	Team
Gold medal – first place	2022 Hangzhou	Team
Bronze medal – third place	2006 Doha	Doubles
Asian Championships
Gold medal – first place	2005 Jeju-do	Team
Gold medal – first place	2007 Yangzhou	Doubles
Gold medal – first place	2007 Yangzhou	Team
Gold medal – first place	2009 Lucknow	Singles
Gold medal – first place	2009 Lucknow	Doubles
Gold medal – first place	2009 Lucknow	Mixed doubles
Gold medal – first place	2009 Lucknow	Team
Gold medal – first place	2011 Macau	Singles
Gold medal – first place	2011 Macau	Team
Gold medal – first place	2013 Busan	Singles
Gold medal – first place	2013 Busan	Team
Gold medal – first place	2015 Pattaya	Team
Gold medal – first place	2017 Wuxi	Team
Gold medal – first place	2023 Pyeongchang	Singles
Gold medal – first place	2023 Pyeongchang	Team
Silver medal – second place	2007 Yangzhou	Singles
Silver medal – second place	2013 Busan	Doubles
Silver medal – second place	2023 Pyeongchang	Doubles
Bronze medal – third place	2005 Jeju-do	Mixed doubles
Bronze medal – third place	2011 Macau	Doubles
Asian Cup
Gold medal – first place	2008 Sapporo	Singles
Gold medal – first place	2009 Hangzhou	Singles
Gold medal – first place	2011 Changsha	Singles
Gold medal – first place	2014 Wuhan	Singles
Silver medal – second place	2019 Yokohama	Singles
ITTF World Tour Grand Finals
Gold medal – first place	2006 Hong Kong	Doubles
Gold medal – first place	2008 Macau	Singles
Gold medal – first place	2009 Macau	Singles
Gold medal – first place	2011 London	Singles
Gold medal – first place	2015 Lisbon	Singles
Gold medal – first place	2016 Doha	Singles
Gold medal – first place	2020 Zhengzhou	Singles
Silver medal – second place	2011 London	Doubles
Silver medal – second place	2013 Dubai	Singles
Silver medal – second place	2019 Zhengzhou	Singles
Bronze medal – third place	2007 Beijing	Singles
Bronze medal – third place	2007 Beijing	Doubles
National Games of China
Gold medal – first place	2013 Liaoning	Singles
Gold medal – first place	2013 Liaoning	Mixed doubles
Gold medal – first place	2017 Tianjin	Singles
Gold medal – first place	2021 Shaanxi	Doubles
Gold medal – first place	2025 Guangdong, Hong Kong & Macau	Team
Silver medal – second place	2009 Shandong	Singles
Silver medal – second place	2017 Tianjin	Doubles
Silver medal – second place	2021 Shaanxi	Team
Bronze medal – third place	2005 Jiangsu	Singles
Bronze medal – third place	2005 Jiangsu	Doubles
Bronze medal – third place	2009 Shandong	Team
Bronze medal – third place	2013 Liaoning	Team
All China Table Tennis Championships
Gold medal – first place	2010 Zhangjiagang	Doubles
Gold medal – first place	2011 Jiangsu	Singles
Gold medal – first place	2011 Jiangsu	Team
Gold medal – first place	2012 Zhangjiagang	Mixed doubles
Gold medal – first place	2012 Zhangjiagang	Team
Gold medal – first place	2015 Haerbing	Doubles
Gold medal – first place	2018 Anshan	Team
Gold medal – first place	2020 Weihai	Doubles
Gold medal – first place	2026 Changsha	Doubles
Silver medal – second place	2004 Wuxi	Singles
Silver medal – second place	2006 Nanjing	Doubles
Silver medal – second place	2007 Wuxi	Singles
Silver medal – second place	2007 Wuxi	Doubles
Silver medal – second place	2008 Zhangjiagang	Mixed doubles
Silver medal – second place	2014 Hubei	Singles
Silver medal – second place	2014 Hubei	Doubles
Silver medal – second place	2016 Anshan	Mixed doubles
Silver medal – second place	2020 Weihai	Singles
Silver medal – second place	2020 Weihai	Team
Bronze medal – third place	2006 Nanjing	Singles
Bronze medal – third place	2007 Wuxi	Team
Bronze medal – third place	2008 Zhangjiagang	Singles
Bronze medal – third place	2008 Zhangjiagang	Doubles
Bronze medal – third place	2008 Zhangjiagang	Team
World Junior Championships
Gold medal – first place	2003 Santiago	Team
Gold medal – first place	2004 Kobe	Singles
Gold medal – first place	2004 Kobe	Team
Silver medal – second place	2003 Santiago	Mixed doubles
Silver medal – second place	2004 Kobe	Doubles
Silver medal – second place	2004 Kobe	Mixed Doubles
Asian Junior Championships
Gold medal – first place	2004 New Delhi	Singles
Gold medal – first place	2004 New Delhi	Mixed doubles
Gold medal – first place	2004 New Delhi	Team
Silver medal – second place	2003 Hyderabad	Doubles
Silver medal – second place	2004 New Delhi	Doubles

Ma Long (Chinese: 马龙; pinyin: Mǎ Lóng; born 20 October 1988) is a Chinese professional table tennis player. He is a two-time Olympic champion, three-time World Champion, and three-time World Cup champion in men's singles. Widely regarded as the greatest table tennis player of all time, he is the only male player to complete a career double Grand Slam as the Olympic gold medalist in men's singles in 2016 and 2020. He is also the only table tennis athlete to win 6 gold medals in the Summer Olympics — no other player has more than 4. He holds the record for most Olympic gold medals won by a Chinese athlete.

Ma held the world number 1 ranking for a total of 64 months (and 34 consecutive months from March 2015), the most by any man in the history of table tennis. He won the World Championship in men's singles consecutively in 2015, 2017 and 2019. His records led the International Table Tennis Federation to nickname him "The Captain", "The Dictator" and "The Dragon" (derived from his name, Lóng, which represents the zodiac year of his birth).

== Career ==
=== Early career ===
After winning both the Asian and World Junior Championships, Long became the youngest world champion at the age of 17 after he participated in the 2006 Bremen World Team Championship. He developed his foundations under the tutelage of Wang Hao and former Chinese National Team coach Ma Kai Xuan before studying under Qin Zhijian. Before turning 22, he had great success in singles, reaching the finals of 11 ITTF World Tour tournaments (winning 8). He won the Asian Cup and World Tour Grand Finals twice, and also made it to the final round of the Asian Championships two times (losing to former coach Wang Hao in 2007 and winning in 2009). In addition, he played in the finals of the China National Games and All China Championships, losing both matches to Wang. Despite being the No. 1 player in the world for much of 2010–2014 stretch, he was not chosen to represent China at the 2012 Olympics due to his temporary dip in ratings that happened after a 560-day win streak on the ITTF World Tour. He suffered career setback by Japan's Koki Niwa in six games at the Asian Olympic Qualification Tournament, then lost to Lee Sang-su at the 2012 Korea Open, 4–1. As players were selected based on the ITTF World Rankings, he was not given an opportunity to win an Olympic medal in singles at the time when he was widely accepted as the best table tennis player in the world.

Chinese National Team coach Liu Guoliang remarked that Ma had all the tools necessary to be the best, yet at major tournaments, he had so far lacked sufficient mental toughness to play to his full ability under pressure. This was evident in his losses to Timo Boll and Vladimir Samsonov in the 2008 and 2009 World Cup semifinals, and to Wang Hao (4–1, 4–2, 4–2) in the semifinals of three consecutive World Championships (2009, 2011, and 2013). Although he performed well on the ITTF World Tour and in domestic competitions, he didn't make it to the final of the World Championships in his first four attempts. This led to many believing he was inferior to compatriot Zhang Jike, who completed his Grand Slam in just over a year.

=== 2013–2015: Increasing consistency ===
After his third defeat to Wang Hao at the WTTC in 2013, Ma had a successful year. He won the China Open at two different locations (beating Wang and then Xu Xin in the final), the Asian Championships (for the third time), and the China National Games in a full-stretch match against Fan Zhendong. However, Xu defeated him 4–3 at the end of the year at the ITTF World Tour Grand Finals. In March 2014, he won the Asian Cup for the fourth time, again defeating Fan in seven games. At the 2014 WTTC, he did not lose a single game. In the final against Germany, he played a pivotal role, beating Timo Boll in the opening match and defeating Dimitrij Ovtcharov for the win. For his efforts, he was awarded the Victor Barna Award as the tournament's best player. He then won the China Open for the fifth time, which tied him with Wang Liqin for the most ever. Ma's first encounter with Zhang Jike at a Grand Slam competition came in October 2014, at the World Cup in Düsseldorf. Although he was leading 3–2 in sets, Ma lost the match, saving two match points in the deciding game but still losing 10–12. This led to further criticism of his inability to come through on the biggest stages at the toughest moments. In November, he reached the final of the Chinese National Championships, but was defeated by Fan, 4–2, again ending the year on a sour note.

However, 2015 would prove to be Ma's year. He won the Kuwait Open, beating Xu Xin 4–1 in the final, and then the German Open, getting revenge on Zhang Jike in an intense final after being down 3–1. But his biggest win came at the 2015 WTTC, where he did not drop more than one set until the final where he defeated tournament sensation Fang Bo in six games. This was a huge breakthrough for him, as his only other major singles title was the 2012 World Cup. After a surprising 4–1 loss to Shang Kun at the Japan Open, Ma won the China Open for a record sixth time, winning 4–1 against Xu Xin. In September, he led Ningbo over Fan Zhendong and Bayi to win the Chinese Super League championship. Injuries prevented him from competing at the Asian Championships, but he participated in the World Cup in Halmstad in October. Following a dropped set to Omar Assar in the round of 16, he did not lose another game in the competition, allowing his opponents to score an average of 6 points per set the rest of the tournament. He did not participate in the last two World Tour tournaments of the year, again due to injuries, but still was seeded first at the World Tour Grand Finals because he had won 3 other World Tour tournaments. In the final, he faced Fan again, winning 11–9 in the last game of a full-stretch match, coming back from being down 3–2 in sets (after being up 2–0), including down 8–6 in the sixth and 6–2 in the decider (when he won 8 points in a row). In 2015, Ma only lost once in international competition and just five times overall.

=== 2016: Grand Slam, Record-extending Fifth End-of-year Finale title ===
Ma Long won the German Open in January 2016, going undefeated until the final, where he beat Vladimir Samsonov 4–1. While helping China win the 2016 WTTC over Japan in Kuala Lumpur, he didn't lose a game, which extended his unbeaten streak to three straight World Team Championships. In March, he reached the final of the Kuwait Open, but was defeated 4–1 by Zhang Jike, who had recently defeated him 5–4 in China's Trials for the 2016 WTTC. However, a week later, he won the Qatar Open by defeating Fan in five games, breaking Wang Liqin's record for most ITTF World Tour singles titles by a Chinese player. In April, he directly qualified for the Olympic Singles in Rio by winning his section of the Asian Olympic Qualification Tournament, taking down Zhang and then Fan in six and five games respectively. After this, Ma remained world No. 1, despite not participating in another international competition until the middle of June. Within a span of two weeks, Xu Xin beat him twice, first in the semi-finals of the Japan Open (his second consecutive loss at that station dating back to last year) in six games, and then in the full-stretch final of the Korea Open (Xu had also beaten him the last time he participated at Korea, in the final in 2013). This was the shortest time between international losses for Ma since 2012 (when he lost to Niwa and Lee).

At the Olympics in Rio, he automatically qualified to third round in the singles due to his No. 1 ranking. He swept Denmark's Jonathan Groth, but experienced a scare in the next round when he went down 2–0 to Korea's Jeoung Young-sik. However, he recovered and won the next four games to advance to the quarterfinals. His next opponent was Quadri Aruna from Nigeria, who had upset Timo Boll and Chuang Chih-yuan to become the first African player to make it to the singles quarterfinals at the Olympics. Ma beat him in four straight games to face Jun Mizutani, Japan's top player, in the semi-finals. The first three games were all 11–5 wins by Ma, but Mizutani took the next game 11–7 and the fifth 12–10. Ma won the sixth, again 11–5, to set up a historic final match against reigning Olympic champion Zhang Jike. Their second meeting at a Grand Slam final was very unexpected: Ma took the gold by overpowering Zhang in a 4–0 rout (14–12, 11–5, 11–4, 11–4), the first four-game sweep in an Olympic singles final.

By winning the gold medal in Rio, Ma etched himself a place as an immortal figure in table tennis history. He became the fifth male player to complete the Grand Slam, and the second male to be the defending champion of all three Grand Slam competitions simultaneously (Zhang being the first). He was the second male (after Kong Linghui) to win the ITTF World Tour Grand Finals and the three Grand Slam titles (dubbed a "Full House" in an ITTF article), being the first to win them all consecutively (therefore being the first male to be the reigning champion of all four at the same time) and the fastest to complete it (in just 467 days). In addition, he became the first male to have won every important singles competition possible, from majors to the ITTF World Tour to domestic competitions. The only other player who has done so is Deng Yaping.

As the current World Champion, he was slated to participate in the 2016 World Cup in Saarbrücken, Germany, but withdrew a month before the competition, citing exhaustion in addition to waist and knee pain. He did, however, play in the China Open in Chengdu, where his reasons for withdrawing from the World Cup were brought to light: he barely survived a seven-game semifinal with Zhang Jike and was crushed in a sweep by Fan Zhendong in the finals. This marked the first time since the 2008 China Open that Ma lost in four games on the ITTF World Tour, excluding a withdraw from the 2014 Qatar Open due to injury. In December, Ma participated in the ITTF World Tour Grand Finals in Doha, Qatar, his last international event of the year. Although he entered as the first seed, he received a scare in the round of 16 from host nation's Li Ping, a former Chinese National Team member, going down 1–2. However, he won the next three games to take the match in six games, and beat both Wong Chun Ting and Jeoung Young-sik 4–0 to face Fan in the final for the second straight year. Just like the previous year, Ma clearly started better, winning the first three, before Fan won the next two, including three championship points, to stay in the match. But despite displaying wonderful resilience and brilliance under pressure, the 19-year-old could not extend the match to seven games. The Dragon closed the year by winning the 2016 ITTF World Tour Grand Finals, his record 5th title in the event, more than any other player. This accomplishment also marked his fifth consecutive major title won. However, that success did not carry over to domestic competitions. Despite his team, Shandong Weiqiao, being ranked No. 1 for much of the 2016 Chinese Super League, they were defeated 3–1 in the semi-finals by Bazhou and rising star Liang Jingkun, who beat Ma 3–1 to decide the match. For his accomplishments in 2016, Ma was named male athlete of the year at the China Central Television (CCTV) Sports Awards Gala in Beijing.

=== 2017: Second World Championships title and Second National Games title ===
Ma began 2017 by winning the Qatar Open in February for the second year in a row, defeating Fan Zhendong 4–1 in the final. However, Fan would get his revenge at China's trials for the 2017 WTTC, dubbed "the Marvellous 12." Ma and Fan, No. 1 and No. 2 in the world respectively, each had 9 wins after the first 11-round stage, but Fan beat Ma in their head-to-head in an exciting three-game match that went down to the wire (6–11, 11–5, 12–14). Unfortunately, Ma injured his waist during his final match against Lin Gaoyuan and had to withdraw from the trials, missing out on one of the three guaranteed spots in the 2017 WTTC. The Dragon looked to bounce back at the Asian Championships held in Wuxi in April and, while he did contribute to a Chinese victory in the team competition, he lost to Korea's Jeong Sang-eun 3–1 in the men's singles round of 32, which was the biggest upset of the tournament.

Despite his up-and-down start to 2017, Ma was given the chance to participate at the world championships held in Düsseldorf from late May to early June. Entering as the No. 1 seed, Ma progressed through the first four rounds without too much trouble, except for a tough six-game match against Sweden's Anton Källberg, who he had never played before. In the quarterfinals, he faced the host nation's Timo Boll, who had played an excellent tournament in front of his home crowd. He then quickly booked his place in the final by sweeping teammate Xu Xin, who was making his second appearance in a WTTC singles semi-final (he was also swept by Zhang Jike in 2013). The 2017 WTTC men's singles final did not disappoint. Ma and Fan faced off once again in a major competition, having played each other at least once in every major within the last two years except the Olympics. Fan raced to a 7-1 lead in the first set and took it 11-7. However, Ma quickly came back to win the next three games (11-3, 11-6, 11-8) and it looked like another five or six game win for the World Champion. But as he had done in their past encounters, the fearless 20-year old rose to the occasion. He won the fifth and sixth games (11-5, 11-7) to push the match to a seventh game, the first seven game WTTC men's singles final since Ma Lin's and Wang Liqin's legendary clash in 2007. Fan won the first two points of the set, but Ma raced to a 6-3 lead. Unwilling to give in, Fan leveled it at 7-7, then won the next two points on Ma's serve. Down 7-9 with Fan serving, things did not look good for the Dragon, but he reeled off three in a row to have match point. Afterwards, China's head coach Liu Guoliang remarked that if Fan had chosen a different serve at that crucial juncture at 9-7, he would have had a better chance. But unlike the 2015 Grand Finals, Ma was not able to capitalize with his serve at 10-9 in the seventh. After two loops, Fan hit a big smash to Ma's wide forehand, which tied it at 10-10. Unfortunately for Fan, he was not able to capitalize with his serve either; his third ball banana flick hit the net and went long. Leading 11-10, Ma served short to Fan's wide backhand, then smashed it wide down the line to his forehand, securing the point and the title. The win put him on par with Zhang Jike and Ma Lin for the most Grand Slam titles (5) and he became the first male with 10 major titles. This also marked his sixth consecutive major title won. Since 2015, he had won every major competition he had participated in.

In June, Ma won the Japan Open in Tokyo, beating Xu (who had defeated him there last year) in 6 games and Fan in 5 on his way to the title. This was the first time he won in Japan, meaning he has won at every major station on the ITTF World Tour (Kuwait, Germany, China, Qatar, Japan, and Korea).

From late August to early September, Ma represented Beijing at the 2017 China National Games in three events: singles, doubles, and team. In the team event group stage, Ma and Beijing were put in the same division as defending champions PLA, led by Fan Zhendong. When Beijing and PLA went head to head, Ma beat Zhou Yu 3–1, but was brutally swept by Fan as PLA took the match 3–1 and finished first in the division. However, Beijing still qualified for the knockout stage by winning their other two matches and finishing second in the group. In the team quarterfinals, they faced Lin Gaoyuan and Guangdong. Ma beat Zhou Qihao 3–0, but Beijing still found themselves on the brink of elimination going into the fourth match. Ma lost to Lin in five games (9–11, 12–10, 11–5, 12–14, 4–11) and Beijing bowed out of the team tournament, a disappointing result considering they had finished 3rd in the team event in the last two National Games. The 2011 World Champion men's doubles partnership was reunited as Ma and Xu Xin were paired together in the doubles event. They cruised to the final, sweeping all of their opponents along the way, to face defending champions Fan and Zhou Yu from PLA. The match was epic and went the full seven games. Ma and Xu narrowly lost the final game by the smallest margin (9–11), settling for silver as Fan and Zhou defended their title. After the match, both pairs acknowledged that Xu had been affected by injuries sustained from playing deep into the team event, which he won with Shanghai.

The injuries eventually caused Xu to withdraw from the singles event the next day. Similarly to the doubles, Ma navigated the singles pretty easily, never dropping more than a game until the final. There, he met Fan yet again, who had received a walk over in the semi-finals due to Xu's injuries. After winning the first game, Ma found himself down 2–1, as Fan controlled the rallies with his backhand receive and backhand punch. However, Ma adjusted his tactics and Fan was unable to respond appropriately, leading to a 4–2 win and a successful defense of the men's singles title for the Dragon. With the win, he became the second male to win two singles titles at the China National Games (Wang Tao in 1987 and 1997) and is the first to win two in a row. He has played in the last three singles finals at the National Games, the first player to do so.

The next major competition that Ma participated in was 2017 World Cup, held in Liège in October. As the first seed, Ma automatically advanced to the knockout stage, where he recorded consecutive five-game wins over Omar Assar and Koki Niwa. In the semi-finals, he faced Timo Boll, who had defeated Lin Gaoyuan in an epic seven-game thriller where the German had won despite being down 10–4 in the final game. The match between Boll and Ma was significant because the two had played each other in the 2008 World Cup semi-finals, also in Liège. Even more coincidentally, the match mirrored their encounter nine years before, with Ma taking a 3–1 lead, then Boll taking the next two games to force a seventh. Just like his match with Zhang Jike in 2014 World Cup final, Ma found himself down 10–8 in the deciding game, but managed to tie it up at 10–10. Multiple histories repeated themselves, as Boll took the next two points to add to his legendary track record in Liège (where he had consecutively defeated the Chinese trio of Ma Lin, Wang Liqin, and Wang Hao to win the 2005 World Cup and reached the final in 2008 by beating Ma). The loss was a devastating blow to Ma, and that was visible during the third-place match against France's Simon Gauzy. Ma lost two of the first three games before recovering to win the match in six games. This was his last international competition in 2017, because his wife was expecting a baby. He still played in the Chinese Super League, but did not travel outside of China to play any tournaments. His son was born on 9 December 2017.

=== 2018: Fifth German Open and Seventh China Open titles ===
At the beginning of 2018, Ma's world ranking dropped to 9th as a result of being inactive. The ITTF had previously announced that they were implementing a new ranking system at the start of the new year, and the new system gave more weight to activity than to a player's playing strength. Because of this, the Dragon not only lost his number 1 ranking, which he had held for the last 34 months, but he also dropped out of the top five in the ITTF world ranking for the first time since 2011. Despite being lower ranked, Ma made his presence felt at the 2018 World Team Cup held in London in late February. He went undefeated in both singles and doubles throughout the entire tournament and helped China sweep Japan in the final. In March, Ma won the German Open for the fifth time over a very strong field. He defeated Maharu Yoshimura, Jun Mizutani, Timo Boll, Wong Chun Ting, and compatriot Xu Xin en route to his 25th ITTF World Tour singles title, which brought his world ranking up to 6th.

Due to the new ITTF ranking system, Team China was not seeded first at the 2018 WTTC held in Halmstad from late April to early May. Nevertheless, Ma and his Chinese teammates did not experience any difficulties in the group stage, collectively going 15–0 to finish first in Group B. However, he survived a scare in the quarterfinals when Austria's Robert Gardos took the Dragon to a full five games in their first ever encounter. Ma reasserted his dominance throughout the rest of the tournament, defeating Sweden's Mattias Karlsson in straight sets in front of the latter's home crowd and then sweeping Timo Boll in the final as China swept top-seeded Germany to claim their 21st title in the event.

After China's victory in Halmstad, Ma won the China Open, defeating Lin Yun-Ju, Wang Chuqin, Liang Jingkun, Lim Jong-hoon, and Fan Zhendong to win his 26th ITTF World Tour singles title. However, this would be his last successful singles event for nine months. At the Japan Open, he was defeated in six games by rising Japanese star Tomokazu Harimoto and although he won the doubles title with Xu Xin at the Bulgaria Open in August, he lost to Liam Pitchford in the men's singles round of 32. It was discovered that Ma had a knee injury, something that would keep him out of all tournaments for the rest of 2018. These included the Austrian Open, the World Cup, the Swedish Open, and the World Tour Grand Finals.

=== 2019: Third Consecutive World Championship title, Fourth Qatar Open and Eighth China Open titles ===
Ma's injuries persisted into 2019, preventing him from participating in the Marvellous 12, the Chinese qualifier for the 2019 WTTC in Budapest in April. Despite this, he was still included in the Chinese lineup for the championships in both singles and doubles. His long-awaited return to international competition came at the Qatar Open in late March. It wasn't clear how well he would play due to his seven-month absence from the game, and it showed when he needed six games to defeat Tristan Flore in his opening match. But after that, he appeared to be in good form. He swept Timo Boll and Jun Mizutani consecutively, then won a hard-fought six-game match against Xu Xin in the semi-finals. In the final against compatriot Lin Gaoyuan, he overcame a 0–2 deficit, including 2–7 in the fifth game, to win in six games. Immediately after winning the match, he posed in front of the camera, appearing to wipe the dust off his racket to indicate he was fine even after being inactive for so long. The victory tied him with Vladimir Samsonov for the most ITTF World Tour singles titles by a male player with 27.

However, not all was going perfectly for Ma Long, as he suffered his first loss to Fan Zhendong in international competition in years in the final of the 2019 Asian Cup, which led many to believe the Dragon's reign would soon come to an end. Though it was possible that they could soon play each other again at the World Championships, this proved not to be the case as Fan was defeated 4–2 by lower-ranked compatriot Liang Jingkun in one of the many upsets of the tournament, who was then subsequently defeated by Ma Long 4–1 in the semifinals; the second Chinese player he'd eliminated in the tournament in addition to Lin Gaoyuan. In the final, the Dragon overpowered Sweden's Mattias Falck 4–1 to win his third consecutive World Championship, becoming the first player since Wang Liqin to win three such titles and the first since Zhuang Zedong (in 1961, 1963, and 1965) to win them consecutively.

=== 2020: Record-extending Sixth End-of-year Finale title ===
Ma won runner-up in the 2020 World Cup, losing to Fan Zhendong in the finals. In the semi-finals, Ma was trailing 3–1 against Harimoto before he called a time-out in game 5 and switched to a high-toss serve that Harimoto had trouble reading. As a result, Ma was able to come back for a 4–3 victory. However, Ma closed this year by winning to Fan Zhendong 4–1 in the finals of ITTF World Tour finals extending his record to the 6th title in the event.

=== 2021: Double Grand Slam ===
In May, Ma played in the China Olympic scrimmages. He lost 4–3 to Zhou Qihao in the semi-finals of the first leg of scrimmage. In mid-May, Ma was selected alongside Fan Zhendong to represent China in the men's singles event of the Tokyo Olympics. Shortly after, Ma was upset 4–2 by Xu Chenhao in the quarter-finals of the second leg of the scrimmage.

In June, Ma sat down with WTT to conduct an interview on his Olympic preparations. He stated that the most important preparation for him going into Tokyo was mental preparation and that he had to be even better mentally prepared than he was in London 2012 and Rio 2016.

At the 2020 Summer Olympics, Ma beat compatriot Fan Zhendong 4–2 in the final, making him the first player in history to win consecutive gold medals in the men's singles event. After the match, Fan called Ma the greatest player of this generation. During the 2020 Summer Olympics, he also became the first male table tennis player to have won five Olympic gold medals after beating Timo Boll 3-1, maintaining China's 100% win rate for the men's teams event.

In September, Ma withdrew from the men's singles event at the China National Games, citing the tight schedule due to the Tokyo Olympics and mandatory 21-day quarantine. Ma led Beijing to the silver medal in the team event, losing deuce in the fifth game to Fan Zhendong in the finals. Ma held six match points against Fan, but Fan came back with the help of four net balls in the last eight points.

=== 2023: Record-extending Fourth Asian Championships Title ===
Ma, alongside teammates Fan Zhendong and Wang Chuqin after winning the 2024 World Team Table Tennis Championships in Busan.

At the Lanzhou Station of the 2023 WTT Star Challenge, the men's singles event ushered in the 1/16 finals on October 5. Nine players from the Chinese table tennis team participated in this stage. Fan Zhendong, the world's number one, withdrew due to injury. Wang Chuqin and Ma Long, Liang Jingkun, Lin Gaoyuan, Zhou Qihao and other famous players will play.

Ma Long 3-1 Nanasekaran [11-6, 6-11, 11-7, 11-6]

Ma Long's opponent Nanasekaran is also from India. He is currently 30 years old and 4 years younger than Ma Long. He is currently ranked 107th in the world. Ma Long is ranked third in the world. He lost the second game of this game, but the overall situation of the game was under control. He successfully qualified for the top 16 and then competed with South Korean player Zhao Shengmin for the top eight spots.

"Ten years ago, I won the championship in South Korea. I also won the singles championship and the men's doubles. The history is always surprisingly similar. Ten years ago, I could win several singles titles a year, but for me now, I don't only look for championship. Sometimes it is very difficult to win a game. Although it is difficult, I will still try my best to win every victory." In the men's singles final of the PyeongChang Asian Table Tennis Championships on September 10, 34-year-old Ma Long defeated Fan Zhendong, the current world number one in men's singles and this year's World Championship champion, ending the singles "champion drought" that lasted for more than two years after the Tokyo Olympics, and won the Asian Championship men's singles championship for the fourth time.

=== 2024: Third World Cup Title ===
In the second half of February 2024, Ma participated in the 2024 World Team Table Tennis Championships in Busan, South Korea, along with his compatriots, Wang Chuqin, Fan Zhendong, Liang Jingkun, and Lin Gaoyuan as representatives for Team China. They won the championships in a 3-0 victory against Team France, ending in a 3-1 match between Ma Long and Simon Gauzy.

On 15 April 2024, The ITTF Men’s and Women’s World Cup Macao 2024 commenced, with a brand new qualification system that shocked and confused table tennis players and enthusiasts alike around the world. Despite this, Ma Long emerged as the winner in his group, winning all 8 games he played against Edward Ly (4-0) and Aditya Sareen (4-0). With this victory in the group stage, Ma qualified for the round of 16, where he faced Felix Lebrun and ultimately won 4-2 (11-7, 11-8, 7-11, 11-8, 8-11, 11-8), thereby proceeding to the next stage where he fought against Shunsuke Togami, winning 4 sets to 2 (5-11, 11-5, 7-11, 11-7, 11-3, 11-3).

His next opponent for the semifinals after winning against Togami was Wang Chuqin, the world rank no. 1 at the time, a younger, fellow Chinese player of Ma. Wang Chuqin had a winning head-to-head record against Ma Long, winning 8 matches to 2 for Ma. Due to Wang Chuqin winning his 6 most recent encounters with Ma Long, as well as the former’s recent dominance in the men’s side of table tennis, Wang Chuqin was initially expected to win the match. The first game of the match saw the unexpected, early timeout of Ma after Wang challenged the 9-7 lead of Ma by winning the next point, but Ma eventually won the first game. The next three games saw Ma using his unusual reverse pendulum serve, a wise decision as it led him to finally break the streak of Wang and win the match with a 4-0 landslide victory against his younger teammate.

His victory led him to face another compatriot of his, Lin Gaoyuan, who won against Tomokazu Harimoto with a similar 4-0 win in the semifinals. Like Wang Chuqin, Lin was the winner of his most recent encounter with Ma, with the former having both his first 2 wins against Ma in 2024. With this, Ma was also expected to having the finals lost to Lin, with Anders Linda commenting in the official video released by ITTFWorld saying that he predicted a 4-1 win for Lin. The expectations were reasonable as Lin Gaoyuan led 3 games to none against Ma 26 minutes into the match. However, things turned for the better for Ma, who—after seeing his reverse pendulum serve posing no threat to Lin—employed yet another unusual serve (as far as Ma Long’s service game goes), a backhand serve, which ultimately made the match more difficult for Lin and thus challenged his mental strength. Ultimately, Ma Long won the match, and thus the World Cup title for the third time, defying limitations set by his relatively senior age, as well as predictions favoring the compatriot he battled against in the semifinals.

On July 24, the Chinese sports delegation announced that Ma Long and Feng Yu were the flag bearers of the Chinese sports delegation at the opening ceremony of the Paris Olympics. On August 9, the 2024 Paris Olympics men's team gold medal match in table tennis, Wang Chuqin/Ma Long beat Anton Källberg/Kristian Karlsson 3-2, and ultimately helped China beat Sweden 3-0 to win the title. At the same time, Ma Long, who has participated in four Olympic Games, also collected his sixth Olympic gold medal, becoming the first “six gold king” in China's Olympic history.

Ma withdrew from ITTF world rankings on 31 December 2024.

=== 2025 ===
On April 23, 2025, Ma was appointed as the Vice President of the Chinese Table Tennis Association.

== Personal life ==
In January 2017, Ma Long married his longtime girlfriend Xia Lu, who is from Nanjing, Jiangsu. On 10 December 2017, he announced the birth of their son on Sina Weibo.

Ma has a close friendship with teammate Liu Shiwen and cried when she won the 2019 World Championships.

== Career records ==
Singles (as of October 2024)

- Olympic Games: winner (2016, 2020)
- World Championships: winner (2015, 2017, 2019); SF (2009, 2011, 2013, 2023).
- World Cup: winner (2012, 2015, 2024); runner-up (2014, 2020); third place (2008, 2009, 2017).
- ITTF World Tour Grand Finals: winner (2008, 2009, 2011, 2015, 2016, 2020); runner-up (2013, 2019); SF (2007).
- ITTF World Tour winner (28): Kuwait, German Open 2007; Korea, Singapore Open 2008; Danish, Kuwait, Harmony China (Suzhou), English Open 2009; German Open 2010; Harmony China (Suzhou), Austrian, Swedish Open 2011; Hungarian Open 2012; Qatar, China (Changchun), Harmony Open (Suzhou) 2013; China (Chengdu) Open 2014; Kuwait, German, China (Chengdu) Open 2015; German, Qatar Open 2016; Qatar, Japan Open 2017; German, China (Shenzhen) Open 2018; Qatar, China (Shenzhen) Open 2019.
  Runner-up (21): German Open 2005; Japan, Swedish Open 2007; UAE, China (Shenzhen) Open 2011; Slovenian, China (Shanghai) Open 2012; Kuwait, Korea, UAE Open 2013; Kuwait, Korea, China (Chengdu) Open 2016; Korea Open 2019; German Open 2020; Singapore Smash 2022; Singapore Smash, Macao Champions, Lanzhou Star Contender, Frankfurt Champions 2023; China Smash 2024.
- Asian Games: winner (2010).
- Asian Championships: winner (2009, 2011, 2013, 2023); runner-up (2007).
- Asian Cup: winner (2008, 2009, 2011, 2014), runner-up (2019).
- China National Games: winner (2013, 2017), runner-up (2009), SF (2005).
- Chinese National Championships: winner (2011); runner-up (2004, 2007, 2014, 2020); SF (2006, 2008).
- World Junior Championships: winner (2004); QF (2003).
- Asian Junior Championships: winner (2004)

Doubles

- World Championships: winner (2011, 2019); runner-up (2009).
- ITTF World Tour Grand Finals: winner (2006); runner-up (2011); SF (2007).
- ITTF World Tour winner (26): China (Harbin) Open 2005; Slovenian Open 2006; Swedish Open 2007; Danish, Qatar, English Open 2009; Kuwait, German Open 2010; China (Shenzhen), Austrian Open 2011; Slovenian, Korea, China (Shanghai) Open 2012; China (Suzhou), China (Changchun) Open 2013; China (Chengdu) Open 2014; Japan Open 2015; Japan Open, China (Chengdu) Open 2016; Japan Open 2017; German, Bulgaria Open 2018; Qatar Open 2020; Singapore, Saudi Smash, Taiyuan Contender 2024.
  Runner-up (12): China (Shenzhen) Open 2005; Singapore Open 2006; China (Shenzhen) Open 2007; Qatar, Korea Open 2008; Kuwait Open 2009; China (Suzhou) Open 2011; Kuwait, Qatar, Korea Open 2013; German Open 2020; Ljubljana Star Contender 2023.
- Asian Games: winner (2014); SF (2006).
- Asian Championships: winner (2007, 2009); runner-up (2013); SF (2011).
- China National Games: winner (2021); runner-up (2017); SF (2005).
- Chinese National Championships: winner (2010, 2015, 2020); runner-up (2006, 2007, 2014); SF (2008).
- World Junior Championships: runner-up (2004).
- Asian Junior Championships: runner-up (2003, 2004).

Mixed doubles

- Asian Games: QF (2006).
- Asian Championships: winner (2009); SF (2005).
- China National Games: winner (2013).
- Chinese National Championships: winner (2012); runner-up (2008, 2016).
- World Junior Championships: runner-up (2003, 2004).
- Asian Junior Championships: winner (2004).

Team

- Olympic Games: 1st (2012, 2016, 2020, 2024)
- World Championships: 1st (2006, 2008, 2010, 2012, 2014, 2016, 2018, 2022, 2024).
- World Cup: 1st (2009, 2010, 2011, 2013, 2015, 2018, 2019, 2023).
- Asian Games: 1st (2006, 2010, 2014, 2022).
- Asian Championships: 1st (2005, 2007, 2009, 2011, 2013, 2015, 2017, 2023).
- China National Games: 1st(2025); 2nd (2021); 3rd (2009, 2013)
- Chinese National Championships: 1st (2011, 2012, 2018); 3rd (2007, 2008, 2010).
- Chinese Super League: 1st (2009, 2012, 2013, 2015, 2020, 2022, 2023); 2nd (2021); 3rd (2014, 2016).
- World Junior Championships: 1st (2003, 2004).
- Asian Junior Championships: 1st (2004).

Summary of Accomplishments

- 6x Olympic Champion (2 Singles, 4 Team)
- 14x World Champion (3 Singles, 2 Doubles, 9 Team)
- 11x World Cup winner (3 Singles, 8 Team)
- 7x ITTF World Tour Grand Finals Champion (6 Singles, 1 Doubles)
- 54x ITTF World Tour winner (28 Singles, 26 Doubles)
- 6x Asian Games winner (1 Singles, 1 Doubles, 4 Team)
- 15x Asian Champion (4 Singles, 2 Doubles, 1 Mixed Doubles, 8 Team)
- 4x Asian Cup winner (4 Singles)
- 4x China National Games Champion (2 Singles, 1 Doubles, 1 Mixed Doubles)
- 7x Chinese National Champion (1 Singles, 2 Doubles, 1 Mixed Doubles, 3 Team)
- 5x Chinese Super League Champion (4 Team)
- 3x World Junior Champion (1 Singles, 2 Team)
- 3x Asian Junior Champion (1 Singles, 1 Mixed Doubles, 1 Team)
- 2015, 2016 ITTF Male Star of the Year
- 2016 CCTV Sports Personality of the Year

Head to head vs. other notable players (December 2004 – present)

(bold indicates a Chinese teammate)

- Timo Boll: 17–4
- Chen Chien-An: 3–0
- Chen Qi: 19–2
- Chuang Chih-Yuan: 17–2
- Mattias Falck: 4–0
- Fan Zhendong: 25–15
- Fang Bo: 10–2
- Marcos Freitas: 4–0
- Tomokazu Harimoto: 5–2
- Gao Ning: 10–0
- Hao Shuai: 20–9
- Jeoung Young-sik: 6–0
- Joo Se-Hyuk: 20–3
- Petr Korbel: 4–1
- Kalinikos Kreanga: 3–0
- Felix Lebrun: 6–0
- Liang Jingkun: 8–1
- Lin Gaoyuan: 9–2
- Lin Yun-ju: 9–4
- Ma Lin: 30–14
- Michael Maze: 7–0
- Jun Mizutani: 16–0
- Oh Sang-eun: 9–2
- Dimitrij Ovtcharov: 20–0
- Ryu Seungmin: 7–3
- Vladimir Samsonov: 9–5
- Werner Schlager: 9–0
- Tang Peng: 14–0
- Wang Chuqin: 5–8
- Wang Hao: 30–27
- Wang Liqin: 32–12
- Wong Chun Ting: 21–1
- Xu Xin: 32–14
- Yan An: 8–3
- Kaii Yoshida: 6–1
- Zhang Jike: 31–10
- Zhou Yu: 10–2

Other Records

- Went unbeaten for 40 singles matches in December 2011.
- Did not drop a single set in six tournaments: Swedish Open 2011, 2012 WTTC, World Team Classic 2013, 2014 and 2016 WTTC.
- In singles, he has won the World Tour Grand Finals six times, the China Open eight times, the German Open five times, the Qatar Open four times, the Asian Championships four times, and the Asian Cup four times, the most ever.
- One of two players to sweep all four medals in an Asian Championship (Fan Zhendong).
- Most ITTF World Tour singles titles (28) by a male player.
- Most major titles (14) by a male player.
- First player to sweep his opponent in an Olympic Singles final since the Olympics extended matches to seven games in 2004.
- Second male player to win the World Championships, World Cup, Olympics, and World Tour Grand Finals. He is the first male player to be the defending champion of all four at the same time.
- Fastest player ever to win all possible singles titles (2,092 days, from 20 November 2010 to 11 August 2016).
- Fastest player ever to complete a "Full House" (467 days, from 3 May 2015 to 11 August 2016).
- First player, male or female, to win the ITTF Star Player of the Year award in consecutive years.
- Won at least one tournament at every major station on the ITTF World Tour.
- First and only male player to have won two consecutive singles titles at the China National Games.
- First player to win 3 men's singles titles in the World Championships since Wang Liqin. First player to win them consecutively since Zhuang Zedong.
- First and only male player to defend his Olympic Gold Medal in singles.
- First and only male player to become a double Grand Slam winner.
- First and only Chinese athlete to win 6 Olympic gold medals.
- First and only player, male or female, to win 6 Olympic gold medals.

== International competitions (Results from the ITTF database) ==
Event	Year	City	Country	Singles	Doubles	Mixed	Team	Mixed Team
Asian Championships ATTU	2023	Pyeongchang	KOR	Gold	Silver		Gold	
Asian Championships ATTU	2017	Wuxi	CHN	Rnd of 32			Gold	
Asian Championships ATTU	2015	Pataya	THA				Gold	
Asian Championships ATTU	2013	Busan	KOR	Gold	Silver		Gold	
Asian Championships ATTU	2011	Macau	MAC	Gold	Bronze		Gold	
Asian Championships ATTU	2009	Lucknow	IND	Gold	Gold	Gold	Gold	
Asian Championships ATTU	2007	Yangzhou	CHN	Silver	Gold		Gold	
Asian Championships ATTU	2005	Jeju-do	KOR			Semi-final	Gold	
Asian Cup	2019	Yokohama	JPN	Silver				
Asian Cup	2014	Wuhan	CHN	Gold				
Asian Cup	2011	Changsha	CHN	Gold				
Asian Cup	2009	Hangzhou	CHN	Gold				
Asian Cup	2008	Sapporo	JPN	Gold				
Asian Games	2022	Hangzhou	CHN				Gold	
Asian Games	2014	Incheon	KOR		Gold		Gold	
Asian Games	2010	Guangzhou	CHN	Gold			Gold	
Asian Games	2006	Doha	QAT		Semi-final	Quarter-final	Gold	
Olympic games	2024	Paris	FRA				Gold	
Olympic games	2020	Tokyo	JPN	Gold			Gold	
Olympic games	2016	Rio de Janeiro	BRA	Gold			Gold	
Olympic games	2012	London	GBR				Gold	
World Championships WTTC	2024	Busan	KOR				Gold	
World Championships WTTC	2023	Durban	RSA	Semi-final				
World Championships WTTC	2022	Chengdu	CHN				Gold	
World Championships WTTC	2019	Budapest	HUN	Gold	Gold			
World Championships WTTC	2018	Halmstad	SWE				Gold	
World Championships WTTC	2017	Düsseldorf	GER	Gold	Rnd of 16			
World Championships WTTC	2016	Kuala Lumpur	MYS				Gold	
World Championships WTTC	2015	Suzhou	CHN	Gold	Rnd of 32			
World Championships WTTC	2014	Tokyo	JPN				Gold	
World Championships WTTC	2013	Paris	FRA	Semi-final				
World Championships WTTC	2012	Dortmund	GER				Gold	
World Championships WTTC	2011	Rotterdam	NLD	Semi-final	Gold			
World Championships WTTC	2010	Moskau	RUS				Gold	
World Championships WTTC	2009	Yokohama	JPN	Semi-final	Silver			
World Championships WTTC	2008	Guangzhou	CHN				Gold	
World Championships WTTC	2007	Zagreb	HRV	Rnd of 16	Rnd of 16			
World Championships WTTC	2006	Bremen	GER				Gold	
World Cup	2024	Macau	MAC	Gold				
World Cup	2023	Chengdu	CHN					Gold
World Cup	2020	Weihai	CHN	Silver				
World Cup	2019	Tokyo	JPN				Gold	
World Cup	2018	London	GBR				Gold	
World Cup	2017	Lüttich	BEL	Bronze				
World Cup	2015	Halmstad	SWE	Gold				
World Cup	2015	Dubai	UAE				Gold	
World Cup	2014	Düsseldorf	GER	Silver				
World Cup	2013	Guangzhou	CHN				Gold	
World Cup	2012	Liverpool	GBR	Gold				
World Cup	2011	Magdeburg	GER				Gold	
World Cup	2010	Dubai	UAE				Gold	
World Cup	2009	Moskau	RUS	Bronze			Gold	
World Cup	2008	Lüttich	BEL	Bronze				
WTT Finals	2023	Doha	QAT	Quarter-final				
WTT Cup Finals	2022	Xinxiang	CHN	Semi-final				
World Tour Grand Finals	2020	Zhengzhou	CHN	Gold				
World Tour Grand Finals	2019	Zhengzhou	CHN	Silver				
World Tour Grand Finals	2016	Doha	QAT	Gold				
World Tour Grand Finals	2015	Lissabon	PRT	Gold				
World Tour Grand Finals	2013	Dubai	UAE	Silver				
Pro Tour Grand Finals	2011	London	GBR	Gold	Silver			
Pro Tour Grand Finals	2009	Macau	MAC	Gold				
Pro Tour Grand Finals	2008	Macau	MAC	Gold				
Pro Tour Grand Finals	2007	Beijing	CHN	Semi-final	Semi-final			
Pro Tour Grand Finals	2006	Hong-Kong	HKG		Gold			
Pro Tour Grand Finals	2005	Fuzhou	CHN	Quarter-final				
WTT Smash	2024	Beijing	CHN	Silver				
WTT Contender	2024	Taiyuan	CHN		Gold			
WTT Smash	2024	Jeddah	SAU	Rnd of 32	Gold			
WTT Champions	2024	Incheon	KOR	Semi-final				
WTT Smash	2024	Singapore	SGP	Rnd of 32	Gold			
WTT Champions	2023	Frankfurt	GER	Silver				
WTT Star Contender	2023	Lanzhou	CHN	Silver				
WTT Star Contender	2023	Ljubljana	SVN	Rnd of 16	Silver			
WTT Champions	2023	Macau	MAC	Silver				
WTT Smash	2023	Singapore	SGP	Silver				
WTT Champions	2022	Budapest	HUN	Semi-final	Semi-final			
WTT Smash	2022	Singapore	SGP	Silver				
World Tour	2020	Doha	QAT	Rnd of 16	Gold			
World Tour	2020	Magdeburg	GER	Silver	Silver			
World Tour	2019	Busan	KOR	Silver				
World Tour	2019	Shenzhen	CHN	Gold				
World Tour	2019	Doha	QAT	Gold				
World Tour	2018	Shenzhen	CHN	Gold				
World Tour	2018	Bremen	GER	Gold	Gold			
World Tour	2017	Tokyo	JPN	Gold	Gold			
World Tour	2017	Doha	QAT	Gold	Rnd of 16			
World Tour	2016	Chengdu	CHN	Silver	Gold			
World Tour	2016	Tokyo	JPN	Semi-final	Gold			
World Tour	2016	Incheon	KOR	Silver	Semi-final			
World Tour	2016	Doha	QAT	Gold	Rnd of 16			
World Tour	2016	Kuwait City	KWT	Silver	Semi-final			
World Tour	2016	Berlin	GER	Gold				
World Tour	2015	Bremen	GER	Gold	Quarter-final			
World Tour	2015	Warsaw	POL	Rnd of 32	Quarter-final			
World Tour	2015	Chengdu	CHN	Gold	Semi-final			
World Tour	2015	Kobe	JPN	Rnd of 16	Gold			
World Tour	2015	Kuwait City	KWT	Gold	Semi-final			
World Tour	2014	Chengdu	CHN	Gold	Gold			
World Tour	2014	Doha	QAT	Rnd of 16	Quarter-final			
World Tour	2013	Dubai	UAE	Silver				
World Tour	2013	Suzhou	CHN	Gold	Gold			
World Tour	2013	Changchun	CHN	Gold	Gold			
World Tour	2013	Incheon City	KOR	Silver	Silver			
World Tour	2013	Doha	QAT	Gold	Silver			
World Tour	2013	Kuwait City	KWT	Silver	Silver			
World Tour	2012	Shanghai	CHN	Silver	Gold			
World Tour	2012	Incheon City	KOR	Rnd of 16	Gold			
World Tour	2012	Velenje	SVN	Silver	Gold			
World Tour	2012	Budapest	HUN	Gold				
Pro Tour	2011	Stockholm	SWE	Gold	Quarter-final			
Pro Tour	2011	Schwechat	AUT	Gold	Gold			
Pro Tour	2011	Suzhou	CHN	Gold	Silver			
Pro Tour	2011	Shenzhen	CHN	Silver	Gold			
Pro Tour	2011	Dubai	UAE	Silver	Semi-final			
Pro Tour	2011	Doha	QAT	Semi-final	Semi-final			
Pro Tour	2010	Berlin	GER	Gold	Gold			
Pro Tour	2010	Kuwait City	KWT	Semi-final	Gold			
Pro Tour	2010	Doha	QAT	Semi-final	Quarter-final			
Pro Tour	2009	Sheffield	GBR	Gold	Gold			
Pro Tour	2009	Su Zhou	CHN	Gold	Semi-final			
Pro Tour	2009	Doha	QAT	Rnd of 32	Gold			
Pro Tour	2009	Kuwait City	KWT	Gold	Silver			
Pro Tour	2009	Frederikshavn	DNK	Gold				
Pro Tour	2009	Frederikshavn	DNK		Gold			
Pro Tour	2008	Shanghai	CHN	Quarter-final	Semi-final			
Pro Tour	2008	Singapore	SGP	Gold	Quarter-final			
Pro Tour	2008	Daejeon	KOR	Gold	Silver			
Pro Tour	2008	Yokohama	JPN	Semi-final				
Pro Tour	2008	Changchun	CHN	Semi-final				
Pro Tour	2008	Doha	QAT	Quarter-final	Silver			
Pro Tour	2008	Kuwait City	KWT	Semi-final	Semi-final			
Pro Tour	2007	Stockholm	SWE	Silver	Gold			
Pro Tour	2007	Bremen	GER	Gold	Semi-final			
Pro Tour	2007	Toulouse	FRA	Semi-final				
Pro Tour	2007	Shenzhen	CHN	Quarter-final	Silver			
Pro Tour	2007	Nanjing	CHN	Quarter-final	Quarter-final			
Pro Tour	2007	Chiba	JPN	Silver	Quarter-final			
Pro Tour	2007	Kuwait	KWT	Gold	Semi-final			
Pro Tour	2007	Doha	QAT	Quarter-final	Semi-final			
Pro Tour	2007	Velenje	SVN	Rnd of 16	Rnd of 16			
Pro Tour	2007	Zagreb	HRV	Semi-final	Quarter-final			
Pro Tour	2006	Guangzhou	CHN	Rnd of 16	Quarter-final			
Pro Tour	2006	Singapore	SGP	Semi-final	Silver			
Pro Tour	2006	Kunshan	CHN	Rnd of 16	Semi-final			
Pro Tour	2006	Kuwait City	KWT	Rnd of 64	Quarter-final			
Pro Tour	2006	Doha	QAT	Rnd of 32	Quarter-final			
Pro Tour	2006	Zagreb	HRV	Rnd of 16	Semi-final			
Pro Tour	2006	Velenje	SVN	Quarter-final	Gold			
Pro Tour	2005	Göteborg	SWE	Quarter-final	Rnd of 16			
Pro Tour	2005	Magdeburg	GER	Silver	Rnd of 16			
Pro Tour	2005	Yokohama	JPN	Semi-final	Quarter-final			
Pro Tour	2005	Shenzhen	CHN	Semi-final	Silver			
Pro Tour	2005	Harbin	CHN	Rnd of 32	Gold			
Pro Tour	2005	Doha	QAT	Rnd of 32				
Asian Junior Championships ATTU	2004	New Delhi	IND	Gold	Silver	Gold	Gold	
Asian Junior Championships ATTU	2003	Hyderabad	IND		Silver	Silver	Semi-final	
World Cadet Challenge WCC	2003	Genting Highlands	MYS	Gold	Gold		Gold	
World Junior Championships WJTTC	2004	Kobe	JPN	Gold	Silver	Silver	Gold	
World Junior Championships WJTTC	2003	Santiago	CHL	Gold		Silver	Gold	
World Junior Circuit	2004	Taiyuan	CHN	Semi-final				
World Junior Circuit	2003	Wellington	NZL	Semi-final				

== See also ==
- Table tennis at the 2012 Summer Olympics – Men's team
- Table tennis at the 2016 Summer Olympics
- Table tennis at the 2020 Summer Olympics
- Table tennis at the 2024 Summer Olympics – Men's team
- 2015 World Table Tennis Championships - Men's Singles
- 2017 World Table Tennis Championships - Men's Singles
- 2019 World Table Tennis Championships
- Table Tennis World Cup#Winners
- China national table tennis team

Olympic Games
Preceded by Zhu Ting & Zhao Shuai	Flagbearer for China (with Feng Yu); Paris 2024	Succeeded by Incumbent
