= 2007 Asian Table Tennis Championships =

- Date: 17–23 September 2007
- Edition: 18th
- Location: Yangzhou, China

Champions

Men's singles
- (China) Wang Hao

Women's singles
- (China) Zhang Yining

Men's doubles
- (China) Ma Long / (China) Hao Shuai

Women's doubles
- (China) Guo Yue / (China) Li Xiaoxia

Mixed doubles
- (South Korea) Oh Sang-eun / (South Korea) Kwak Bang-bang

Men's team
- China

Women's team
- China
← 2005 ·	Asian Table Tennis Championships	· 2009 →

The 18th Asian Table Tennis Championships 2007 were held in Yangzhou, China, from 17 to 23 September 2007. It was organised by the Chinese Table Tennis Association under the authority of Asian Table Tennis Union (ATTU) and International Table Tennis Federation (ITTF).

== Medal summary ==
=== Medal table ===
* Host nation (China)

Rank	Nation	Gold	Silver	Bronze	Total
1	China*	6	4	2	12
2	South Korea	1	0	2	3
3	Hong Kong	0	1	4	5
4	Japan	0	1	2	3
5	Singapore	0	1	1	2
6	Chinese Taipei	0	0	2	2
7	North Korea	0	0	1	1
Totals (7 entries)		7	7	14	28

=== Events ===
Event	Gold	Silver	Bronze
Men's singles	(China) Wang Hao	(China) Ma Long	(Hong Kong) Ko Lai Chak
Men's singles	(China) Wang Hao	(China) Ma Long	(South Korea) Oh Sang-eun
Women's singles	(China) Zhang Yining	(China) Li Xiaoxia	(China) Guo Yan
Women's singles	(China) Zhang Yining	(China) Li Xiaoxia	(China) Wang Nan
Men's doubles	(China) Ma Long (China) Hao Shuai	(China) Wang Hao (China) Chen Qi	(Chinese Taipei) Chuang Chih-Yuan (Chinese Taipei) Wu Chih-Chi
Men's doubles	(China) Ma Long (China) Hao Shuai	(China) Wang Hao (China) Chen Qi	(Japan) Jun Mizutani (Japan) Seiya Kishikawa
Women's doubles	(China) Guo Yue (China) Li Xiaoxia	(China) Zhang Yining (China) Wang Nan	(Hong Kong) Tie Yana (Hong Kong) Zhang Rui
Women's doubles	(China) Guo Yue (China) Li Xiaoxia	(China) Zhang Yining (China) Wang Nan	(Singapore) Sun Beibei (Singapore) Yu Mengyu
Mixed doubles	(South Korea) Oh Sang-eun (South Korea) Kwak Bang-bang	(Hong Kong) Ko Lai Chak (Hong Kong) Tie Yana	(South Korea) Choi Hyun Jin (South Korea) Shim Sqe Rom
Mixed doubles	(South Korea) Oh Sang-eun (South Korea) Kwak Bang-bang	(Hong Kong) Ko Lai Chak (Hong Kong) Tie Yana	(North Korea) Kim Hyok Bong (North Korea) Kim Jong
Men's team	China	Japan	Chinese Taipei
Men's team	China	Japan	Hong Kong
Women's team	China	Singapore	Hong Kong
Women's team	China	Singapore	Japan
