= 1992 Asian Table Tennis Championships =

Table tennis tournament

- Date: 7–14 November 1992
- Edition: 11th
- Location: New Delhi, India

Champions

Men's singles
- (China) Xie Chaojie

Women's singles
- (China) Tang Weiyi

Men's doubles
- (South Korea) Kang Hee-chan / (South Korea) Lee Chul-seung

Women's doubles
- (China) Tang Weiyi / (China) Ying Ronghui

Mixed doubles
- (China) Liu Guoliang / (China) Wu Na

Men's team
- China

Women's team
- Hong Kong
← 1990 ·	Asian Table Tennis Championships	· 1994 →

The 11th Asian Table Tennis Championships 1992 were held in New Delhi, India, from 7 to 14 November 1992. It was organised by the Table Tennis Federation of India under the authority of Asian Table Tennis Union (ATTU) and International Table Tennis Federation (ITTF).

== Medal summary ==
=== Medal table ===
Rank	Nation	Gold	Silver	Bronze	Total
1	China	5	2	5	12
2	South Korea	1	2	1	4
3	Hong Kong	1	0	0	1
4	North Korea	0	2	5	7
5	Singapore	0	1	0	1
6	Chinese Taipei	0	0	1	1
Totals (6 entries)		7	7	12	26

=== Events ===
Event	Gold	Silver	Bronze
Men's singles	(China) Xie Chaojie	(South Korea) Kang Hee-chan	(North Korea) Kim Guk-chol
Men's singles	(China) Xie Chaojie	(South Korea) Kang Hee-chan	(North Korea) Li Sung Il
Women's singles	(China) Tang Weiyi	(China) Wu Na	(China) Wang Chen
Women's singles	(China) Tang Weiyi	(China) Wu Na	(China) Ying Ronghui
Men's doubles	(South Korea) Kang Hee-chan (South Korea) Lee Chul-seung	(North Korea) Li Sung-il (North Korea) Ri Gun-sang	(China) Li Yi (China) Liu Guoliang
Men's doubles	(South Korea) Kang Hee-chan (South Korea) Lee Chul-seung	(North Korea) Li Sung-il (North Korea) Ri Gun-sang	(China) Wang Yonggang (China) Xie Chaojie
Women's doubles	(China) Tang Weiyi (China) Ying Ronghui	(Singapore) Gao Dong Ping (Singapore) Jing Junhong	(North Korea) Kim Hyon-ae (North Korea) Wi Bok-sun
Women's doubles	(China) Tang Weiyi (China) Ying Ronghui	(Singapore) Gao Dong Ping (Singapore) Jing Junhong	(North Korea) Li Mi-suk (North Korea) Yu Sun-bok
Mixed doubles	(China) Liu Guoliang (China) Wu Na	(South Korea) Lee Chul-seung (South Korea) Ryu Ji-hae	(China) Xie Chaojie (China) Tang Weiyi
Mixed doubles	(China) Liu Guoliang (China) Wu Na	(South Korea) Lee Chul-seung (South Korea) Ryu Ji-hae	(Chinese Taipei) Chih Chin-shui (Chinese Taipei) Chen Chiu-tan
Men's team	China	North Korea	South Korea
Women's team	Hong Kong	China	North Korea

== See also ==
- World Table Tennis Championships
- Asian Cup
