= 2011 Asian Table Tennis Championships =

20th Asian Table Tennis Championships
- Date: 23 February – 1 March 2012
- Edition: 20th
- Location: Macau, China
- Venue: Macau East Asian Games Dome

Champions

Men's singles
- (China) Ma Long

Women's singles
- (China) Guo Yan

Men's doubles
- (Singapore) Gao Ning / (Singapore) Yang Zi

Women's doubles
- (China) Ding Ning / (China) Guo Yan

Mixed doubles
- (China) Xu Xin / (China) Guo Yan

Men's team
- China

Women's team
- China
← 2009 ·	Asian Table Tennis Championships	· 2013 →

The 20th Asian Table Tennis Championships were held in Macau, China, from 23 February to 1 March 2012. It was originally organised and hosted by the Lebanese Table Tennis Federation for 12 to 18 September 2011 with the prospective location of Jamhour Stadium, Beirut, Lebanon. However, due to security deterioration in the region, the Lebanon TTF informed Asian Table Tennis Union(ATTU) that they decided to cancel hosting the 20th ATTC.

== Schedule ==
Five individual and two team events were contested.

Rounds in main draw
Finals

Date	23 February		24 February			25 February		26 February			27 February		28 February			29 February		1 March		
Men's singles											R1	R2				R3	R4	QF	SF	F
Women's singles											R1	R2	R3	R4	QF	SF	F			
Men's doubles											R1	R2	R3		QF	SF	F			
Women's doubles											R1					R2	R3	QF	SF	F
Mixed doubles								R1	R2	R3	QF		SF		F					
Men's team	GS	QF	POS		QF	POS	SF	F												
Women's team	GS	QF	POS	QF	SF	POS	F													

== Medal summary ==
=== Medal table ===
Rank	Nation	Gold	Silver	Bronze	Total
1	China	6	2	5	13
2	Singapore	1	3	0	4
3	South Korea	0	1	3	4
4	Japan	0	1	2	3
5	Hong Kong	0	0	2	2
6	Chinese Taipei	0	0	1	1
6	North Korea	0	0	1	1
Totals (7 entries)		7	7	14	28

=== Events ===
Event	Gold	Silver	Bronze
Men's singles	(China) Ma Long	(China) Zhang Jike	(China) Wang Hao
Men's singles	(China) Ma Long	(China) Zhang Jike	(China) Xu Xin
Women's singles	(China) Guo Yan	(China) Li Xiaoxia	(China) Ding Ning
Women's singles	(China) Guo Yan	(China) Li Xiaoxia	(China) Liu Shiwen
Men's doubles	(Singapore) Gao Ning (Singapore) Yang Zi	(South Korea) Jeoung Youngsik (South Korea) Kim Min-seok	(China) Ma Long (China) Wang Hao
Men's doubles	(Singapore) Gao Ning (Singapore) Yang Zi	(South Korea) Jeoung Youngsik (South Korea) Kim Min-seok	(Hong Kong) Cheung Yuk (Hong Kong) Leung Chu Yan
Women's doubles	(China) Ding Ning (China) Guo Yan	(Singapore) Sun Beibei (Singapore) Li Jiawei	(Hong Kong) Jiang Huajun (Hong Kong) Ng Wing Nam
Women's doubles	(China) Ding Ning (China) Guo Yan	(Singapore) Sun Beibei (Singapore) Li Jiawei	(South Korea) Lee Eun Hee (South Korea) Park Young-sook
Mixed doubles	(China) Xu Xin (China) Guo Yan	(Singapore) Gao Ning (Singapore) Li Jiawei	(Japan) Kenji Matsudaira (Japan) Misako Wakamiya
Mixed doubles	(China) Xu Xin (China) Guo Yan	(Singapore) Gao Ning (Singapore) Li Jiawei	(North Korea) Kim Hyok-Bong (North Korea) Kim Jong
Men's team	China; Ma Long; Xu Xin; Wang Hao; Zhang Jike; Ma Lin	Japan; Koki Niwa; Jun Mizutani; Seiya Kishikawa; Kenta Matsudaira; Kazuhiro Chan	Chinese Taipei; Chuang Chih-Yuan; Chen Chien-An; Huang Sheng-Sheng; Wu Chih-Chi; Lee Chia-Sheng
Men's team	China; Ma Long; Xu Xin; Wang Hao; Zhang Jike; Ma Lin	Japan; Koki Niwa; Jun Mizutani; Seiya Kishikawa; Kenta Matsudaira; Kazuhiro Chan	South Korea; Seo Hyun-deok; Kim Min-seok; Jung Youngsik; Lee Jung Woo; Kim Donghyun
Women's team	China; Guo Yan; Li Xiaoxia; Ding Ning; Liu Shiwen; Guo Yue	Singapore; Feng Tianwei; Wang Yuegu; Li Jiawei; Sun Beibei; Yu Mengyu	Japan; Ai Fukuhara; Kasumi Ishikawa; Sayaka Hirano; Hiroko Fujii; Misako Wakamiya
Women's team	China; Guo Yan; Li Xiaoxia; Ding Ning; Liu Shiwen; Guo Yue	Singapore; Feng Tianwei; Wang Yuegu; Li Jiawei; Sun Beibei; Yu Mengyu	South Korea; Seok Ha-jung; Dang Ye-seo; Park Young-sook; Yang Ha-eun; Yoon Sunae

== See also ==
- 2011 Asian Cup Table Tennis Tournament
