= Sun Beibei =

Singaporean table tennis player

Personal information
- Native name: 孙蓓蓓
- Nationality: Singapore
- Born: 28 January 1984 (age 42) Shandong, China
- Height: 1.58 m (5 ft 2 in)
- Weight: 55 kg (121 lb; 8.7 st)

Sport
- Sport: Table tennis
- Playing style: Right-handed, shakehand grip
- Highest ranking: 14 (December 2007)
Medal record
Women's Table Tennis
Representing Singapore
Event	1st	2nd	3rd
World Championships	1	2	0
World Cup	0	2	1
Asian Games	0	2	0
Asian Championships	0	4	1
Commonwealth Games	2	0	0
Southeast Asian Games	6	1	0
Total	9	11	2
World Championships
Gold medal – first place	2010 Moscow	Team
Silver medal – second place	2008 Guangzhou	Team
Silver medal – second place	2012 Dortmund	Team
World Cup
Silver medal – second place	2009 Linz	Team
Silver medal – second place	2010 Dubai	Team
Bronze medal – third place	2011 Magdeburg	Team
Asian Games
Silver medal – second place	2006 Doha	Team
Silver medal – second place	2010 Guangzhou	Team
Asian Championships
Silver medal – second place	2007 Yangzhou	Team
Silver medal – second place	2009 Lucknow	Team
Silver medal – second place	2012 Macau	Doubles
Silver medal – second place	2012 Macau	Team
Bronze medal – third place	2007 Yangzhou	Doubles
Commonwealth Games
Gold medal – first place	2010 Delhi	Doubles
Gold medal – first place	2010 Delhi	Team
Southeast Asian Games
Gold medal – first place	2007 Nakhon Ratchasima	Doubles
Gold medal – first place	2007 Nakhon Ratchasima	Team
Gold medal – first place	2009 Vientiane	Doubles
Gold medal – first place	2009 Vientiane	Team
Gold medal – first place	2011 Jakarta-Palembang	Doubles
Gold medal – first place	2011 Jakarta-Palembang	Mixed doubles
Silver medal – second place	2007 Nakhon Ratchasima	Mixed doubles

Sun Beibei (simplified Chinese: 孙蓓蓓; traditional Chinese: 孫蓓蓓; pinyin: Sūn Bèi Bèi; born 28 January 1984 in Shandong, China) is a Chinese-born Singaporean former table tennis player. She occupies the 20th place in the ITTF women's world ranking, as of October 2011.

== Career ==
During the semifinals of the women's table tennis team event at the 2006 Asian Games held at Doha, Qatar, Sun defeated Kim Hyang Mi and Kim Jong of North Korea, to help Singapore win the match 3–2, ensuring Singapore's first table tennis medal at the Games. The team eventually lost to the China team 0–3 and clinched the silver medal.

Sun was the reserve player for team Singapore at the 2008 Beijing Olympics.

== Career records ==
Singles (as of 31 July 2010)

- World Championships: round of 32 (2007, 09).
- Pro Tour winner (1): India Open 2007. Runner-up (1): Croatian Open 2005.
- Pro Tour Grand Finals appearances: 4. Record: QF (2008).
- Asian Games: round of 16 (2006).
- Asian Championships: round of 16 (2007, 09).

Women's doubles

- World Championships: round of 16 (2009).
- Pro Tour winner (4): Russian, German Open 2006; India Open 2007; Singapore Open 2008. Runner-up (8): Korea, Chinese Taipei, China (Shenzhen) Open 2005; Slovenian Open 2006; Chinese Taipei Open 2007; Kuwait, Brazil, Chile Open 2008.
- Pro Tour Grand Finals appearances: 4. Record: winner (2008), SF (2005, 06, 09).
- Asian Games: QF (2006).
- Asian Championships: SF (2007).

Mixed doubles

- World Championships: round of 32 (2007).

Teams

- World Championships: 1st (2010); 2nd (2008).
- World Team Cup: 2nd (2009).
- Asian Games: 2nd (2006).
- Asian Championships: 2nd (2007, 09).

== Medals ==
Event	Medal	Date	Competition
2005
Women's singles	Silver	23 January 2005	ITTF Pro Tour Liebherr Croatian Open; Zagreb, Croatia
Women's doubles (with Wang Yuegu)	Silver	12 June 2005	ITTF Pro Tour Volkswagen Korean Open; Suncheon, Jeollanam-do, South Korea
Women's doubles (with Wang Yuegu)	Silver	19 June 2005	ITTF Pro Tour TMS Chinese Taipei Open; Taipei
Women's doubles (with Wang Yuegu)	Bronze	10 July 2005	ITTF Pro Tour Liebherr US Open; Fort Lauderdale, Florida, USA
Women's doubles (with Wang Yuegu)	Silver	18 September 2005	ITTF Pro Tour Volkswagen China Open; Shenzhen, China
Women's doubles (with Wang Yuegu)	Bronze	11 December 2005	ITTF Pro Tour Grand Finals; FuZhou, China
2006
Women's doubles (with Wang Yuegu)	Silver	22 January 2006	ITTF Pro Tour Liebherr Slovenian Open; Velenje, Slovenia
Women's doubles (with Li Jiawei)	Gold	1–5 November 2006	ITTF Pro Tour Eurosib Russian Open; Saint Petersburg, Russia
Women's doubles (with Li Jiawei)	Gold	12 November 2006	ITTF Pro Tour Liebherr German Open; Bayreuth, Bavaria, Germany
Women's doubles (with Li Jiawei)	Bronze	17 December 2006	ITTF Pro Tour Grand Finals; Hong Kong
2007
Women's singles	Gold	11 February 2007	ITTF Pro Tour Indian Open; New Delhi, India
Women's doubles (with Yu Mengyu)	Gold	11 February 2007	ITTF Pro Tour Indian Open; New Delhi, India
Women's singles	Bronze	15 April 2007	ITTF Pro Tour Liebherr Brazilian Open; Belo Horizonte, Brazil
Women's doubles (with Yu Mengyu)	Bronze	15 April 2007	ITTF Pro Tour Liebherr Brazilian Open; Belo Horizonte, Brazil
Women's singles	Bronze	22 April 2007	ITTF Pro Tour Liebherr Chile Open; Santiago, Chile
Women's doubles (with Wang Yuegu)	Bronze	22 April 2007	ITTF Pro Tour Liebherr Chile Open; Santiago, Chile
Women's team (with Li Jiawei, Wang Yuegu, Tan Paey Fern and Yu Mengyu)	Silver	19 September 2007	18th China Mobile Asian Table Tennis Championships; Yangzhou, Jiangsu, People's Republic of China
Women's doubles (with Yu Mengyu)	Bronze	19 September 2007	18th China Mobile Asian Table Tennis Championships; Yangzhou, Jiangsu, People's Republic of China
Women's team (with Li Jiawei, Tan Paey Fern, Wang Yuegu and Yu Mengyu)	Gold	5 December 2007	24th SEA Games; Nakhon Ratchasima (Korat), Thailand
Women's doubles (with Yu Mengyu)	Gold	9 December 2007	24th SEA Games; Nakhon Ratchasima (Korat), Thailand
Mixed doubles (with Gao Ning)	Silver	8 December 2007	24th SEA Games; Nakhon Ratchasima (Korat), Thailand
2008
Women's doubles (with Li Jiawei)	Silver	16 March 2008	ITTF Pro Tour Kuwait Open; Kuwait City, Kuwait
Women's doubles (with Li Jiawei)	Silver	20 April 2008	ITTF Pro Tour Kuwait Open; Belo Horizonte, Brazil
Women's doubles (with Li Jiawei)	Silver	27 April 2008	ITTF Pro Tour Chile Open; Santiago, Chile
Women's doubles (with Li Jiawei)	Gold	8 June 2008	ITTF Pro Tour TMS Singapore Open; Singapore
Women's doubles (with Li Jie NED)	Bronze	14 September 2008	ITTF Pro Tour Panasonic China Open; Shanghai, China
Women's doubles (with Li Jiawei)	Gold	14 December 2008	ITTF Volkswagen Pro Tour Grand Finals; Macau
2010
Women's team (with Feng Tianwei, Li Jiawei, Wang Yuegu and Yu Mengyu)	Gold	8 October 2010	19th Commonwealth Games; New Delhi, India
Women's doubles (with Li Jiawei)	Gold	14 October 2010	19th Commonwealth Games; New Delhi, India

== See also ==
- List of table tennis players
- List of Singapore world champions in sports
