= 1994 Asian Table Tennis Championships =

- Date: 20–27 September 1994
- Edition: 12th
- Location: Tianjin, China

Champions

Men's singles
- (China) Kong Linghui

Women's singles
- (China) Deng Yaping

Men's doubles
- (China) Lin Zhigang / (China) Liu Guoliang

Women's doubles
- (China) Liu Wei / (China) Qiao Yunping

Mixed doubles
- (China) Kong Linghui / (China) Deng Yaping

Men's team
- China

Women's team
- China
← 1992 ·	Asian Table Tennis Championships	· 1996 →

The 12th Asian Table Tennis Championships 1994 were held in Tianjin, China, from 20 to 27 September 1994. It was organised by the Chinese Table Tennis Association under the authority of Asian Table Tennis Union (ATTU) and International Table Tennis Federation (ITTF).

== Medal summary ==
=== Medal table ===
* Host nation (China)

Rank	Nation	Gold	Silver	Bronze	Total
1	China*	7	5	6	18
2	South Korea	0	1	2	3
3	Hong Kong	0	1	1	2
4	Chinese Taipei	0	0	2	2
5	Japan	0	0	1	1
Totals (5 entries)		7	7	12	26

=== Events ===
Event	Gold	Silver	Bronze
Men's singles	(China) Kong Linghui	(China) Liu Guoliang	(China) Lin Zhigang
Men's singles	(China) Kong Linghui	(China) Liu Guoliang	(China) Lü Lin
Women's singles	(China) Deng Yaping	(China) Qiao Hong	(China) Liu Wei
Women's singles	(China) Deng Yaping	(China) Qiao Hong	(China) Qiao Yunping
Men's doubles	(China) Lin Zhigang (China) Liu Guoliang	(China) Lü Lin (China) Wang Tao	(Chinese Taipei) Chiang Peng-lung (Chinese Taipei) Wu Wen-chia
Men's doubles	(China) Lin Zhigang (China) Liu Guoliang	(China) Lü Lin (China) Wang Tao	(South Korea) Kim Bong-chul (South Korea) Oh Sang-eun
Women's doubles	(China) Liu Wei (China) Qiao Yunping	(China) Deng Yaping (China) Qiao Hong	(Chinese Taipei) Chen Chiu-tan (Chinese Taipei) Tsui Hsiu-li
Women's doubles	(China) Liu Wei (China) Qiao Yunping	(China) Deng Yaping (China) Qiao Hong	(Hong Kong) Chai Po Wa (Hong Kong) Chan Tan Lui
Mixed doubles	(China) Kong Linghui (China) Deng Yaping	(China) Wang Tao (China) Liu Wei	(China) Liu Guoliang (China) Qiao Hong
Mixed doubles	(China) Kong Linghui (China) Deng Yaping	(China) Wang Tao (China) Liu Wei	(China) Lü Lin (China) Qiao Yunping
Men's team	China	South Korea	Japan
Women's team	China	Hong Kong	South Korea

== See also ==
- World Table Tennis Championships
- Asian Cup
