= Table tennis at the 2010 Asian Games – Men's singles =

Men's singles at the 2010 Asian Games
- Venue: Guangzhou Gymnasium
- Dates: 15–20 November 2010
- Competitors: 46 from 26 nations

Medalists
gold medal	Ma Long	China
silver medal	Wang Hao	China
bronze medal	Joo Sae-hyuk	South Korea
bronze medal	Jun Mizutani	Japan

The men's singles table tennis event was part of the table tennis programme and took place between November 15 and 20, at the Guangzhou Gymnasium.

== Schedule ==
All times are China Standard Time (UTC+08:00)

Date	Time	Event
Monday, 15 November 2010	11:30	1/32 round
Wednesday, 17 November 2010	21:15	1/16 round
Thursday, 18 November 2010	13:00	1/8 finals
Thursday, 18 November 2010	19:00	Quarterfinals
Saturday, 20 November 2010	11:00	Semifinals
Saturday, 20 November 2010	20:00	Final

== Results ==
Legend

- WO — Won by walkover

=== Finals ===
Quarterfinals
1	Ma Long (CHN)	12	7	7	14	11	11
5	Chuang Chih-yuan (TPE)	10	11	11	12	1	8
7	Tang Peng (HKG)	3	5	9	3
3	Joo Sae-hyuk (KOR)	11	11	11	11
4	Jun Mizutani (JPN)	8	11	8	11	15	12
8	Gao Ning (SIN)	11	2	11	8	13	10
6	Oh Sang-eun (KOR)	4	11	11	5	11	4	3
2	Wang Hao (CHN)	11	9	6	11	7	11	11

Semifinals
1	Ma Long (CHN)	11	11	11	11
3	Joo Sae-hyuk (KOR)	4	7	5	9
4	Jun Mizutani (JPN)	10	4	4	5
2	Wang Hao (CHN)	12	11	11	11

Final
1	Ma Long (CHN)	9	11	11	11	4	12
2	Wang Hao (CHN)	11	8	7	3	11	10

=== Top half ===
==== Section 1 ====
1/32 round					1/16 round						1/8 finals
					1	Ma Long (CHN)	12	11	11	11
Alheiro dos Santos (TLS)	6	1	5	4		Trần Tuấn Quỳnh (VIE)	10	5	4	6
Trần Tuấn Quỳnh (VIE)	11	11	11	11							1	Ma Long (CHN)	11	8	8	11	11	11
											10	Kenta Matsudaira (JPN)	9	11	11	8	9	4
						Chang Hoi Wa (MAC)	7	4	5	4
					10	Kenta Matsudaira (JPN)	11	11	11	11

==== Section 2 ====
1/32 round					1/16 round								1/8 finals
					16	Anthony Amalraj (IND)	11	7	11	13	8	11
Mohd Shakirin Ibrahim (MAS)	11	11	11	11		Mohd Shakirin Ibrahim (MAS)	4	11	8	11	11	8
Hatem Wadi (PLE)	4	6	8	3									16	Anthony Amalraj (IND)	6	10	5	1
Waleed Al-Hajjai (QAT)	12	11	11	11									5	Chuang Chih-yuan (TPE)	11	12	11	11
Bibishyn Bayarmagnai (MGL)	10	4	3	9		Waleed Al-Hajjai (QAT)	3	5	7	1
					5	Chuang Chih-yuan (TPE)	11	11	11	11

==== Section 3 ====
1/32 round					1/16 round								1/8 finals
					7	Tang Peng (HKG)	W	O
Abdulaziz Al-Abbad (KSA)	7	6	8	5		Rachid El-Boubou (LIB)
Rachid El-Boubou (LIB)	11	11	11	11									7	Tang Peng (HKG)	10	15	9	11	7	11	11
Afshin Norouzi (IRI)	11	11	11	11									14	Kim Hyok-bong (PRK)	12	13	11	9	11	8	4
Inom Saidov (TJK)	7	5	7	5		Afshin Norouzi (IRI)	11	11	10	2	9	3
					14	Kim Hyok-bong (PRK)	6	8	12	11	11	11

==== Section 4 ====
1/32 round							1/16 round						1/8 finals
							12	Yang Zi (SIN)	11	11	11	11
Rashed Mohamed (UAE)	8	11	11	8	11	11		Rashed Mohamed (UAE)	2	5	3	6
Purshottam Bajracharya (NEP)	11	6	5	11	7	9							12	Yang Zi (SIN)	9	7	6	7
Chansamone Khunladsuvannavong (LAO)	5	7	11	9	7								3	Joo Sae-hyuk (KOR)	11	11	11	11
Yahya Mossly (SYR)	11	11	7	11	11			Yahya Mossly (SYR)	5	5	2	7
							3	Joo Sae-hyuk (KOR)	11	11	11	11

=== Bottom half ===
==== Section 5 ====
1/32 round					1/16 round						1/8 finals
					4	Jun Mizutani (JPN)	11	11	11	11
Raşid Ahmedow (TKM)	4	5	9	8		Lkhagvadorjiin Altantulga (MGL)	2	6	1	8
Lkhagvadorjiin Altantulga (MGL)	11	11	11	11							4	Jun Mizutani (JPN)	11	11	7	11	6	11
Shiva Sundar Gothe (NEP)	4	6	9	1							9	Li Ching (HKG)	7	5	11	4	11	8
Ahmed Al-Mohannadi (QAT)	11	11	11	11		Ahmed Al-Mohannadi (QAT)	3	9	9	4
					9	Li Ching (HKG)	11	11	11	11

==== Section 6 ====
1/32 round					1/16 round								1/8 finals
					13	Jang Song-man (PRK)	11	11	11	11
Đoàn Kiến Quốc (VIE)	W	O				Đoàn Kiến Quốc (VIE)	3	4	3	7
Naif Al-Jadai (KSA)													13	Jang Song-man (PRK)	5	10	13	10	12	13
Rashed Abdulhamid (UAE)	11	11	11	11									8	Gao Ning (SIN)	11	12	11	12	10	15
Francisco de Yesus (TLS)	3	5	3	2		Rashed Abdulhamid (UAE)	6	11	5	9	11	12
					8	Gao Ning (SIN)	11	9	11	11	8	14

==== Section 7 ====
1/32 round						1/16 round							1/8 finals
						6	Oh Sang-eun (KOR)	11	8	11	11	11
Akbarbek Yakhiaev (TJK)	11	9	7	4			Leong Kin Wa (MAC)	6	11	4	4	5
Leong Kin Wa (MAC)	13	11	11	11									6	Oh Sang-eun (KOR)	11	11	11	10	11
Rohan Sirisena (SRI)	11	11	11	5	11								11	Sharath Kamal (IND)	9	4	7	12	6
Thavisack Phathaphone (LAO)	9	7	6	11	9		Rohan Sirisena (SRI)	9	7	1	8
						11	Sharath Kamal (IND)	11	11	11	11

==== Section 8 ====
1/32 round					1/16 round							1/8 finals
					15	Wu Chih-chi (TPE)	11	11	11	6	11
						Noshad Alamian (IRI)	13	13	9	11	13
													Noshad Alamian (IRI)	7	6	4	4
Husain Al-Bahrani (IOC)	11	13	11	11								2	Wang Hao (CHN)	11	11	11	11
Ibrahim Abukeshek (PLE)	3	11	6	4		Husain Al-Bahrani (IOC)	1	5	6	5
					2	Wang Hao (CHN)	11	11	11	11
