= 2014 ITTF Men's World Cup =

Table tennis tournament in Düsseldorf, Germany

- Location: Düsseldorf, Germany
- Date: 24-26 October 2014
- Competitors: 20

Medalists
gold medal	(China) Zhang Jike
silver medal	(China) Ma Long
bronze medal	(Germany) Timo Boll

The 2014 ITTF Men's World Cup was a table tennis competition held in Düsseldorf, Germany, from 24 to 26 October 2014. It was the 35th edition of the ITTF-sanctioned event.

== Competition format ==
The tournament consisted of two stages: a preliminary group stage and a knockout stage. The players seeded 9 to 20 were drawn into four groups. The top two players from each group then joined the top eight seeded players in the second stage of the competition, which consisted of a knockout draw.

== Seeding ==
The seeding list was based on the official ITTF world ranking as of September 2014.

1. (China) Ma Long (final, silver medalist)
2. (China) Zhang Jike (champion, gold medalist)
3. (Germany) Dimitrij Ovtcharov (quarter-finals)
4. (Japan) Jun Mizutani (semi-finals, fourth place)
5. (Chinese Taipei) Chuang Chih-Yuan (quarter-finals)
6. (Germany) Timo Boll (semi-finals, bronze medalist)
7. (Portugal) Marcos Freitas (quarter-finals)
8. (Hong Kong) Tang Peng (first round)

== Group stage ==
The preliminary group stage took place in 24 October, with the top player in each group progressing to the main draw.

== Main draw ==
The knockout stage took place from 25-26 October.

First round
1	(China) Ma Long	11	11	11	11
(Japan) Kenta Matsudaira	7	4	4	2
(Portugal) Tiago Apolonia	11	11	11	11
7	(Portugal) Marcos Freitas	6	9	2	5
5	(Chinese Taipei) Chuang Chih-Yuan	11	11	2	9	11	12
(Chinese Taipei) Chen Chien-An	8	3	11	11	8	10
(Greece) Gionis Panagiotis	2	10	11	3
4	(Japan) Jun Mizutani	11	12	13	11
3	(Germany) Dimitrij Ovtcharov	9	11	11	8	11	11	12
(India) Sharath Kamal	11	7	6	11	5	13	10
(France) Adrien Mattenet	11	3	7	9	9
6	(Germany) Timo Boll	9	15	11	11	11
8	(Hong Kong) Tang Peng	11	9	10	8	11	3
(Nigeria) Quadri Aruna	7	11	12	11	9	11
(Romania) Adrian Crisan	8	9	11	8
2	(China) Zhang Jike	11	11	13	11

Quarterfinals
1	(China) Ma Long	12	11	11	11
(Portugal) Tiago Apolonia	10	8	6	1
5	(Chinese Taipei) Chuang Chih-Yuan	11	11	6	6	13
4	(Japan) Jun Mizutani	5	13	11	11	15
3	(Germany) Dimitrij Ovtcharov	8	8	5	1
6	(Germany) Timo Boll	11	11	11	11
(Nigeria) Quadri Aruna	11	7	4	7	11	8
2	(China) Zhang Jike	6	11	11	11	8	11

Semifinals
1	(China) Ma Long	11	11	11	11
4	(Japan) Jun Mizutani	9	4	6	7
6	(Germany) Timo Boll	7	11	8	14	11	11	6
2	(China) Zhang Jike	11	5	11	16	6	6	11

Final
1	(China) Ma Long	11	4	11	11	11	5	10
2	(China) Zhang Jike	8	11	13	7	2	11	12
Third place
4	(Japan) Jun Mizutani	11	7	8	11	2	9
6	(Germany) Timo Boll	2	11	11	6	11	11

== See also ==
- 2013 World Table Tennis Championships
- 2014 World Team Table Tennis Championships
- 2015 World Table Tennis Championships
- 2015 ITTF Men's World Cup

Preceded by 2013 ITTF Men's World Cup	ITTF World Cup	Succeeded by 2015 ITTF Men's World Cup
