= 1996 Asian Table Tennis Championships =

- Date: 4–10 December 1996
- Edition: 13th
- Location: Kallang, Singapore

Champions

Men's singles
- (China) Kong Linghui

Women's singles
- (Japan) Chire Koyama

Men's doubles
- (China) Kong Linghui / (China) Liu Guoliang

Women's doubles
- (China) Li Ju / (China) Wang Nan

Mixed doubles
- (China) Ma Lin / (China) Wu Na

Men's team
- South Korea

Women's team
- China
← 1994 ·	Asian Table Tennis Championships	· 1998 →

The 13th Asian Table Tennis Championships 1996 were held in Osaka, Japan, from 4 to 10 December 1996. It was organised by the Singapore Table Tennis Association under the authority of Asian Table Tennis Union (ATTU) and International Table Tennis Federation (ITTF).

== Medal summary ==
=== Medal table ===
Rank	Nation	Gold	Silver	Bronze	Total
1	China	5	5	2	12
2	South Korea	1	1	4	6
3	Japan	1	0	2	3
4	Hong Kong	0	1	2	3
5	Chinese Taipei	0	0	2	2
Totals (5 entries)		7	7	12	26

=== Events ===
Event	Gold	Silver	Bronze
Men's singles	(China) Kong Linghui	(China) Liu Guoliang	(China) Ma Lin
Men's singles	(China) Kong Linghui	(China) Liu Guoliang	(South Korea) Kim Taek-soo
Women's singles	(Japan) Chire Koyama	(China) Wang Chen	(China) Wu Na
Women's singles	(Japan) Chire Koyama	(China) Wang Chen	(Hong Kong) Chan Tan Lui
Men's doubles	(China) Kong Linghui (China) Liu Guoliang	(South Korea) Kang Hee-chan (South Korea) Kim Taek-soo	(Japan) Kōji Matsushita (Japan) Yoji Morimoto
Men's doubles	(China) Kong Linghui (China) Liu Guoliang	(South Korea) Kang Hee-chan (South Korea) Kim Taek-soo	(Japan) Kinjiro Nakamura (Japan) Akira Takashi
Women's doubles	(China) Li Ju (China) Wang Nan	(China) Wang Chen (China) Wu Na	(Chinese Taipei) Tsui Hsiu-li (Chinese Taipei) Yu Feng-yin
Women's doubles	(China) Li Ju (China) Wang Nan	(China) Wang Chen (China) Wu Na	(Hong Kong) Chai Po Wa (Hong Kong) Chan Tan Lui
Mixed doubles	(China) Ma Lin (China) Wu Na	(China) Liu Guoliang (China) Wang Nan	(South Korea) Kim Taek-soo (South Korea) Park Hae-jung
Mixed doubles	(China) Ma Lin (China) Wu Na	(China) Liu Guoliang (China) Wang Nan	(South Korea) Oh Sang-eun (South Korea) Ryu Ji-hae
Men's team	South Korea	China	Chinese Taipei
Women's team	China	Hong Kong	South Korea

== See also ==
- World Table Tennis Championships
- Asian Cup
