= 2015 ITTF Men's World Cup =

Table tennis tournament in Halmstad, Sweden

- Location: Halmstad, Sweden
- Date: 16-18 October 2014
- Competitors: 20

Medalists
gold medal	(China) Ma Long
silver medal	(China) Fan Zhendong
bronze medal	(Germany) Dimitrij Ovtcharov

The 2015 ITTF Men's World Cup was a table tennis competition held in Halmstad, Sweden, from 16 to 18 October 2015. It was the 36th edition of the ITTF-sanctioned event.

== Competition format ==
The tournament consisted of two stages: a preliminary group stage and a knockout stage. The players seeded 9 to 20 were drawn into four groups. The top two players from each group then joined the top eight seeded players in the second stage of the competition, which consisted of a knockout draw.

== Seeding ==
The seeding list was based on the official ITTF world ranking as of August 2015.

1. (China) Ma Long (champion, gold medalist)
2. (China) Fan Zhendong (final, silver medalist)
3. (Germany) Dimitrij Ovtcharov (semi-finals, bronze medalist)
4. (Japan) Jun Mizutani (semi-finals, fourth place)
5. (Portugal) Marcos Freitas (quarter-finals)
6. (Chinese Taipei) Chuang Chih-Yuan (quarter-finals)
7. (Japan) Koki Niwa (quarter-finals)
8. (Hong Kong) Tang Peng (first round)

== Group stage ==
The preliminary group stage took place in 16 October, with the top player in each group progressing to the main draw.

== Main draw ==
The knockout stage took place from 17-18 October.

First round
1	(China) Ma Long	10	11	11	11	11
(Egypt) Omar Assar	12	9	7	5	8
(Greece) Gionis Panagiotis	12	9	12	13	3	0
5	(Portugal) Marcos Freitas	10	11	10	15	11	11
7	(Japan) Koki Niwa	11	7	11	8	11	11
(Austria) Robert Gardos	6	11	6	11	4	5
(Singapore) Gao Ning	4	7	7	6
3	(Germany) Dimitrij Ovtcharov	11	11	11	11
4	(Japan) Jun Mizutani	6	11	11	11	11
(Sweden) Anton Kallberg	11	6	8	7	8
(Brazil) Gustavo Tsuboi	12	11	10	6	11	6	14
8	(Hong Kong) Tang Peng	10	9	12	11	9	11	12
6	(Chinese Taipei) Chuang Chih-Yuan	11	10	11	11	13
(Sweden) Kristian Karlsson	9	12	8	9	11
(France) Simon Gauzy	7	5	10	3
2	(China) Fan Zhendong	11	11	12	11

Quarterfinals
1	(China) Ma Long	12	11	11	11
5	(Portugal) Marcos Freitas	10	4	6	6
7	(Japan) Koki Niwa	12	6	3	8	5
3	(Germany) Dimitrij Ovtcharov	10	11	11	11	11
4	(Japan) Jun Mizutani	11	11	11	11
(Brazil) Gustavo Tsuboi	2	6	5	7
6	(Chinese Taipei) Chuang Chih-Yuan	11	3	7	5	12
2	(China) Fan Zhendong	4	11	11	11	14

Semifinals
1	(China) Ma Long	11	11	11	11
3	(Germany) Dimitrij Ovtcharov	4	2	7	4
4	(Japan) Jun Mizutani	11	5	5	5	7
2	(China) Fan Zhendong	8	11	11	11	11

Final
1	(China) Ma Long	11	11	11	11
2	(China) Fan Zhendong	7	6	8	8
Third place
3	(Germany) Dimitrij Ovtcharov	11	9	11	7	11	11
4	(Japan) Jun Mizutani	9	11	9	11	9	9

== See also ==
- 2014 World Team Table Tennis Championships
- 2014 ITTF Men's World Cup
- 2015 World Table Tennis Championships

Preceded by 2014 ITTF Men's World Cup	ITTF World Cup	Succeeded by 2016 ITTF Men's World Cup
