= 1998 Asian Table Tennis Championships =

- Date: 28 September – 4 October 1998
- Edition: 14th
- Location: Osaka, Japan

Champions

Men's singles
- (China) Wang Liqin

Women's singles
- (China) Li Ju

Men's doubles
- (China) Liu Guoliang / (China) Ma Lin

Women's doubles
- (South Korea) Lee Eun-sil / (South Korea) Ryu Ji-hae

Mixed doubles
- (China) Wang Liqin / (China) Wang Nan

Men's team
- China

Women's team
- China
← 1996 ·	Asian Table Tennis Championships	· 2000 →

The 14th Asian Table Tennis Championships 1998 were held in Osaka, Japan, from 28 September to 4 October 1998. It was organised by the Japan Table Tennis Association under the authority of Asian Table Tennis Union (ATTU) and International Table Tennis Federation (ITTF).

== Medal summary ==
=== Medal table ===
* Host nation (Japan)

Rank	Nation	Gold	Silver	Bronze	Total
1	China	6	1	3.5	10.5
2	South Korea	1	4	3	8
3	Japan*	0	1	2	3
4	North Korea	0	1	0	1
5	Chinese Taipei	0	0	2	2
6	Hong Kong	0	0	1.5	1.5
Totals (6 entries)		7	7	12	26

=== Events ===
Event	Gold	Silver	Bronze
Men's singles	(China) Wang Liqin	(Japan) Seiko Iseki	(China) Liu Guoliang
Men's singles	(China) Wang Liqin	(Japan) Seiko Iseki	(China) Yan Sen
Women's singles	(China) Li Ju	(China) Wang Nan	(Chinese Taipei) Chen Jing
Women's singles	(China) Li Ju	(China) Wang Nan	(Japan) Chire Koyama
Men's doubles	(China) Liu Guoliang (China) Ma Lin	(South Korea) Oh Sang-eun (South Korea) Yoo Nam-kyu	(China) Wang Liqin (China) Yan Sen
Men's doubles	(China) Liu Guoliang (China) Ma Lin	(South Korea) Oh Sang-eun (South Korea) Yoo Nam-kyu	(South Korea) Kim Taek-soo (South Korea) Lee Chul-seung
Women's doubles	(South Korea) Lee Eun-sil (South Korea) Ryu Ji-hae	(South Korea) Kim Moo-kyo (South Korea) Park Hae-jung	(China) Wang Hui (Hong Kong) Wong Ching
Women's doubles	(South Korea) Lee Eun-sil (South Korea) Ryu Ji-hae	(South Korea) Kim Moo-kyo (South Korea) Park Hae-jung	(Japan) Mayu Kishi-Kawagoe (Japan) Akiko Takeda
Mixed doubles	(China) Wang Liqin (China) Wang Nan	(South Korea) Lee Chul-seung (South Korea) Ryu Ji-hae	(South Korea) Oh Sang-eun (South Korea) Kim Moo-kyo
Mixed doubles	(China) Wang Liqin (China) Wang Nan	(South Korea) Lee Chul-seung (South Korea) Ryu Ji-hae	(South Korea) Park Sang-joon (South Korea) Park Hae-jung
Men's team	China	South Korea	Chinese Taipei
Women's team	China	North Korea	Hong Kong

== See also ==
- World Table Tennis Championships
- Asian Cup
