= 2010 World Team Table Tennis Championships =

2010 edition of the World Team Table Tennis Championships

- Venue: Olympic Indoor Arena
- Location: Moscow, Russia
- Dates: 23 May–30 May

Champions
- Men: China
- Women: Singapore

The 2010 Liebherr World Team Table Tennis Championships was held at the Olympic Indoor Arena in Moscow, Russia from May 23 to May 30, 2010. This decision was announced in May 2007. It was the 50th edition to be contested.

== Medal summary ==
=== Medal table ===
Rank	Nation	Gold	Silver	Bronze	Total
1	China (CHN)	1	1	0	2
2	Singapore (SIN)	1	0	0	1
3	Germany (GER)	0	1	1	2
4	Japan (JPN)	0	0	2	2
5	South Korea (KOR)	0	0	1	1
Totals (5 entries)		2	2	4	8

=== Events ===
Event	Gold	Silver	Bronze
Men's team	China; Ma Long; Wang Hao; Ma Lin; Zhang Jike; Xu Xin	Germany; Timo Boll; Dimitrij Ovtcharov; Christian Süß; Bastian Steger; Patrick Baum	Japan; Jun Mizutani; Kaii Yoshida; Seiya Kishikawa; Kenta Matsudaira; Kazuhiro Chan
Men's team	China; Ma Long; Wang Hao; Ma Lin; Zhang Jike; Xu Xin	Germany; Timo Boll; Dimitrij Ovtcharov; Christian Süß; Bastian Steger; Patrick Baum	South Korea; Joo Se-Hyuk; Oh Sang-Eun; Ryu Seung-Min; Cho Eon-Rae; Jung Young-Sik
Women's team	Singapore; Feng Tianwei; Yu Mengyu; Wang Yuegu; Sun Beibei; Li Jiawei	China; Liu Shiwen; Guo Yan; Guo Yue; Ding Ning; Li Xiaoxia	Japan; Ai Fukuhara; Sayaka Hirano; Kasumi Ishikawa; Hiroko Fujii; Ai Fujinuma
Women's team	Singapore; Feng Tianwei; Yu Mengyu; Wang Yuegu; Sun Beibei; Li Jiawei	China; Liu Shiwen; Guo Yan; Guo Yue; Ding Ning; Li Xiaoxia	Germany; Wu Jiaduo; Kristin Silbereisen; Elke Schall; Sabine Winter

== Results ==
=== Men's team ===
==== Final ====
30 May 2010; 16:00	Report	Germany	1–3	China	Olympic Stadium, Moscow
Score by game:
Timo Boll	3–2	Ma Long
Dimitrij Ovtcharov	0–3	Ma Lin
Christian Süß	1–3	Zhang Jike
Timo Boll	1–3	Ma Lin

==== Place 1–12 bracket ====
Ninth place
Austria	0
Czech Republic	3
Eleventh place
Poland	2
Sweden	3

Consolation semifinals
Poland	2
Austria	3
Czech Republic	3
Sweden	2

First round
Poland	0
Belarus	3
Japan	3
Austria	0
Czech Republic	1
Russia	3
Sweden	2
Hungary	3

Quarterfinals
China	3
Belarus	0
Japan	3
Hong Kong	0
Germany	3
Russia	0
Hungary	1
South Korea	3

Semifinals
China	3
Japan	0
Germany	3
South Korea	1
5th–8th classification
Belarus	1
Hong Kong	3
Russia	3
Hungary	1

Final
China	3
Germany	1
Third place
Japan	X
South Korea	X
Fifth place
Hong Kong	3
Russia	2
Seventh place
Belarus	3
Hungary	0

=== Women's team ===
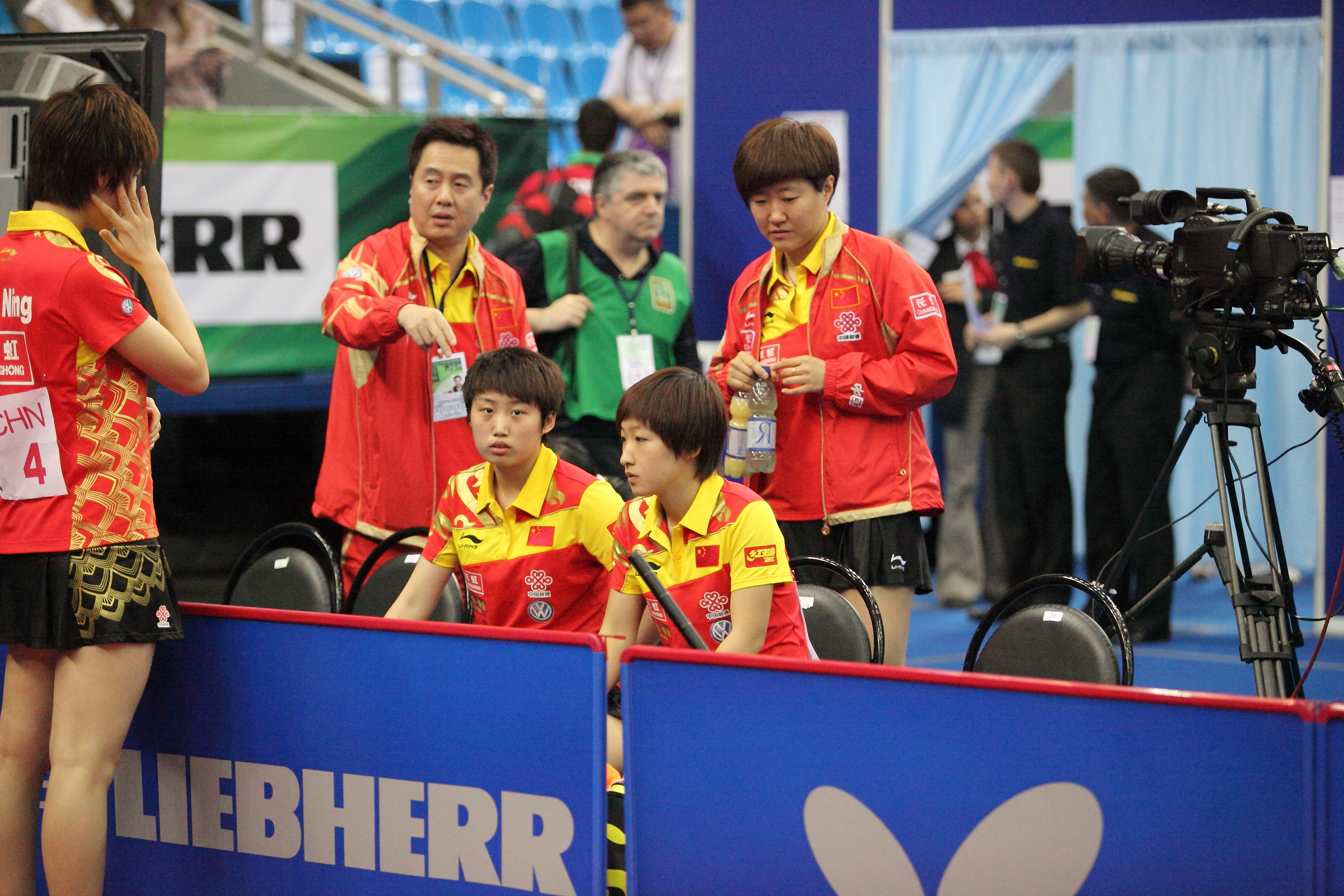
The China national women's team in Moscow (2010)

==== Final ====
30 May 2010; 13:00	Report	Singapore	3–1	China	Olympic Stadium, Moscow
Score by game:
Feng Tianwei	3–2	Ding Ning
Wang Yuegu	3–1	Liu Shiwen
Sun Beibei	1–3	Guo Yan
Feng Tianwei	3–2	Liu Shiwen

==== Place 1–12 bracket ====
Ninth place
Poland	0
Chinese Taipei	3
Eleventh place
Croatia	3
Romania	1

Consolation semifinals
Poland	3
Croatia	1
Romania	1
Chinese Taipei	3

First round
Netherlands	3
Poland	2
South Korea	3
Croatia	1
Romania	1
Germany	3
Chinese Taipei	1
Hungary	3

Quarterfinals
China	3
Netherlands	0
South Korea	2
Japan	3
Hong Kong	1
Germany	3
Hungary	0
Singapore	3

Semifinals
China	3
Japan	0
Germany	0
Singapore	3
5th–8th classification
Netherlands	0
South Korea	3
Hong Kong	3
Hungary	2

Final
China	1
Singapore	3
Third place
Japan	X
Germany	X
Fifth place
South Korea	3
Hong Kong	0
Seventh place
Netherlands	2
Hungary	3
