= 2000 Asian Table Tennis Championships =

- Date: 1–8 May 2000
- Edition: 15th
- Location: Doha, Qatar

Champions

Men's singles
- (Chinese Taipei) Chiang Peng-lung

Women's singles
- (China) Lin Ling

Men's doubles
- (Chinese Taipei) Chang Yen-shu / (Chinese Taipei) Chiang Peng-lung

Women's doubles
- (South Korea) Lee Eun-sil / (South Korea) Seok Eun-mi

Mixed doubles
- (China) Yan Sen / (China) Yang Ying

Men's team
- China

Women's team
- China
← 1998 ·	Asian Table Tennis Championships	· 2003 →

The 15th Asian Table Tennis Championships 2000 were held in Doha, Qatar, from 1 to 8 May 2000. It was organised by the Qatar Table Tennis Association under the authority of Asian Table Tennis Union (ATTU) and International Table Tennis Federation (ITTF).

== Medal summary ==
=== Medal table ===
Rank	Nation	Gold	Silver	Bronze	Total
1	China	4	1	4	9
2	Chinese Taipei	2	2	1	5
3	South Korea	1	3	5	9
4	Hong Kong	0	1	2	3
5	Japan	0	0	2	2
Totals (5 entries)		7	7	14	28

=== Events ===
Event	Gold	Silver	Bronze
Men's singles	(Chinese Taipei) Chiang Peng-lung	(South Korea) Kim Taek-soo	(China) Ma Lin
Men's singles	(Chinese Taipei) Chiang Peng-lung	(South Korea) Kim Taek-soo	(China) Wang Liqin
Women's singles	(China) Lin Ling	(China) Li Nan	(South Korea) Kim Moo-kyo
Women's singles	(China) Lin Ling	(China) Li Nan	(South Korea) Seok Eun-mi
Men's doubles	(Chinese Taipei) Chang Yen-shu (Chinese Taipei) Chiang Peng-lung	(Hong Kong) Cheung Yuk (Hong Kong) Leung Chu Yan	(China) Wang Liqin (China) Yan Sen
Men's doubles	(Chinese Taipei) Chang Yen-shu (Chinese Taipei) Chiang Peng-lung	(Hong Kong) Cheung Yuk (Hong Kong) Leung Chu Yan	(Japan) Seiko Iseki (Japan) Shinnosuke Kiho
Women's doubles	(South Korea) Lee Eun-sil (South Korea) Seok Eun-mi	(South Korea) Kim Moo-kyo (South Korea) Ryu Ji-hae	(China) Sun Jin (China) Yang Ying
Women's doubles	(South Korea) Lee Eun-sil (South Korea) Seok Eun-mi	(South Korea) Kim Moo-kyo (South Korea) Ryu Ji-hae	(Hong Kong) Kwok Fong Fong (Hong Kong) Song Ah Sim
Mixed doubles	(China) Yan Sen (China) Yang Ying	(South Korea) Kim Taek-soo (South Korea) Lee Eun-sil	(Chinese Taipei) Chang Yen-shu (Chinese Taipei) Tsui Hsiu-li
Mixed doubles	(China) Yan Sen (China) Yang Ying	(South Korea) Kim Taek-soo (South Korea) Lee Eun-sil	(South Korea) Lee Chul-seung (South Korea) Ryu Ji-hae
Men's team	China	Chinese Taipei	Japan
Men's team	China	Chinese Taipei	South Korea
Women's team	China	Chinese Taipei	Hong Kong
Women's team	China	Chinese Taipei	South Korea

== See also ==
- 2000 World Table Tennis Championships
- Asian Cup
