= Tang Weiyi =

Chinese table tennis player

Personal information
- Full name: Tang, Weiyi
- Nationality: China

Sport
- Sport: Table tennis
Medal record
Women's table tennis
Representing China
Asian Championships
Gold medal – first place	1992 New Delhi	Singles
Gold medal – first place	1992 New Delhi	Doubles
Bronze medal – third place	1992 New Delhi	Mixed Doubles

Tang Weiyi is a former female table tennis player from China. In 1992 she won three medals in singles, and doubles events in the Asian Table Tennis Championships.

== See also ==
- List of table tennis players
