= 2003 Asian Table Tennis Championships =

- Date: 22–28 February 2003
- Edition: 16th
- Location: Bangkok, Thailand

Champions

Men's singles
- (China) Wang Hao

Women's singles
- (China) Niu Jianfeng

Men's doubles
- (Hong Kong) Ko Lai Chak / (Hong Kong) Li Ching

Women's doubles
- (China) Guo Yan / (China) Li Nan

Mixed doubles
- (China) Liu Guozheng / (China) Li Nan

Men's team
- China

Women's team
- China
← 2000 ·	Asian Table Tennis Championships	· 2005 →

The 16th Asian Table Tennis Championships 2003 were held in Bangkok, Thailand, from 22 to 28 February 2003. It was organised by the Table Tennis Association of Thailand under the authority of Asian Table Tennis Union (ATTU) and International Table Tennis Federation (ITTF).

== Medal summary ==
=== Medal table ===
Rank	Nation	Gold	Silver	Bronze	Total
1	China	6	2	4	12
2	Hong Kong	1	2	5	8
3	Japan	0	2	1	3
4	Chinese Taipei	0	1	0	1
5	South Korea	0	0	3	3
6	Singapore	0	0	1	1
Totals (6 entries)		7	7	14	28

=== Events ===
Event	Gold	Silver	Bronze
Men's singles	(China) Wang Hao	(China) Tang Peng	(Hong Kong) Ko Lai Chak
Men's singles	(China) Wang Hao	(China) Tang Peng	(South Korea) Ryu Seung-min
Women's singles	(China) Niu Jianfeng	(China) Li Nan	(China) Guo Yue
Women's singles	(China) Niu Jianfeng	(China) Li Nan	(Hong Kong) Tie Ya Na
Men's doubles	(Hong Kong) Ko Lai Chak (Hong Kong) Li Ching	(Hong Kong) Cheung Yuk (Hong Kong) Leung Chu Yan	(China) Liu Guozheng (China) Wang Hao
Men's doubles	(Hong Kong) Ko Lai Chak (Hong Kong) Li Ching	(Hong Kong) Cheung Yuk (Hong Kong) Leung Chu Yan	(China) Tang Peng (China) Wang Jianjun
Women's doubles	(China) Guo Yan (China) Li Nan	(Japan) Ai Fukuhara (Japan) An Konishi	(Hong Kong) Song Ah Sim (Hong Kong) Tie Ya Na
Women's doubles	(China) Guo Yan (China) Li Nan	(Japan) Ai Fukuhara (Japan) An Konishi	(South Korea) Lee Eun-sil (South Korea) Kim Kyung-ha
Mixed doubles	(China) Liu Guozheng (China) Li Nan	(Japan) Akira Kito (Japan) An Konishi	(China) Tang Peng (China) Guo Yan
Mixed doubles	(China) Liu Guozheng (China) Li Nan	(Japan) Akira Kito (Japan) An Konishi	(Hong Kong) Cheung Yuk (Hong Kong) Tie Ya Na
Men's team	China	Chinese Taipei	Hong Kong
Men's team	China	Chinese Taipei	South Korea
Women's team	China	Hong Kong	Japan
Women's team	China	Hong Kong	Singapore

== See also ==
- 2003 World Table Tennis Championships
- Asian Cup
