= Chuang Chih-yuan =

Taiwanese table tennis player

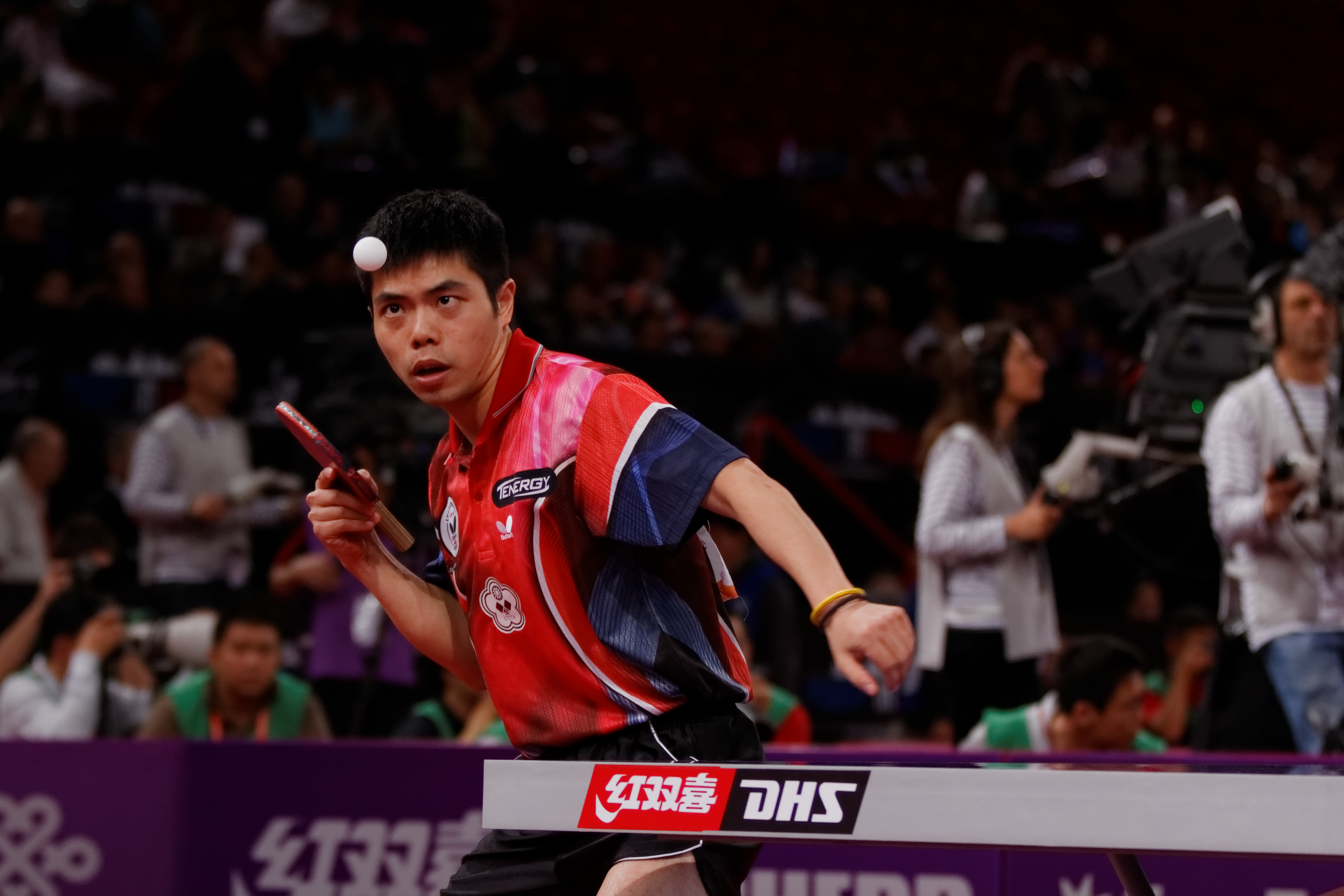
- Chuang at the 2013 World Championships

Personal information
- Born: 2 April 1981 (age 45) Kaohsiung, Taiwan
- Height: 1.69 m (5 ft 7 in)

Sport
- Sport: Table tennis
- Club: TTC RhönSprudel Fulda-Maberzell
- Playing style: Right-handed shakehand grip
- Highest ranking: 3 (December 2003)
Medal record
Men's table tennis
Representing Chinese Taipei
World Championships
Gold medal – first place	2013 Paris	Doubles
Bronze medal – third place	2014 Tokyo	Team
Bronze medal – third place	2024 Busan	Team
World Cup
Silver medal – second place	2013 Guangzhou	Team
Asian Games
Silver medal – second place	2002 Busan	Singles
Bronze medal – third place	1998 Bangkok	Team
Bronze medal – third place	2002 Busan	Team
Bronze medal – third place	2006 Doha	Doubles
Bronze medal – third place	2006 Doha	Team
Bronze medal – third place	2014 Incheon	Singles
Bronze medal – third place	2014 Incheon	Team
Bronze medal – third place	2018 Jakarta	Team
Bronze medal – third place	2022 Hangzhou	Doubles
Bronze medal – third place	2022 Hangzhou	Team
Asian Championships
Silver medal – second place	2000 Doha	Team
Silver medal – second place	2003 Bangkok	Team
Silver medal – second place	2021 Doha	Singles
Silver medal – second place	2021 Doha	Team
Silver medal – second place	2023 Pyeongchang	Team
Bronze medal – third place	2007 Yangzhou	Doubles
Bronze medal – third place	2007 Yangzhou	Team
Bronze medal – third place	2013 Busan	Team
Bronze medal – third place	2015 Pattaya	Singles
Bronze medal – third place	2015 Pattaya	Team
Asian Cup
Bronze medal – third place	2013 Hong Kong	Singles
Bronze medal – third place	2022 Bangkok	Singles

Chuang Chih-yuan (Chinese: 莊智淵; pinyin: Zhuāng Zhìyuān; born 2 April 1981) is a Taiwanese table tennis player. He won the ITTF Pro Tour Grand Finals in 2002 and doubles title at the 2013 World Table Tennis Championships. He participated in the Summer Olympics six times, making the most appearances at the Olympic Games among Taiwanese athletes.

== Career in table tennis ==
Chuang's parents were both table tennis players in Taiwan. His father was a national doubles champion, and his mother Lee Kuei-mei was a member of the national team. After the end of Lee's career as a player, her son, Chih-yuan, became one of her protégés in table tennis.

Chuang started competing in 1989, at the age of eight. From the age of 13 his mother sent him to China for training several times. Chuang first made it to the Taiwan national team in 1998. In 1999, Chuang made his World Championships and ITTF Pro Tour debut. At the end of 2000, his mother decided to let Chuang train in Europe, including France and Germany. The process made his matches a combination of the Chinese and European playing styles.

2002 was a sparkling year in Chuang's career. He reached his first three finals on the Pro Tour, but ended them all as the runner-up. He entered the world top ten list in September, won the silver medal at the Asian Games and participated in his first World Cup. At the year's end, he consecutively faced the opponents who defeated him in the previous three finals of the Pro Tour, and recorded three straight wins at the Pro Tour Grand Finals. He defeated Jean-Michel Saive in the quarter-final, Wang Hao in the semi-final, and Kalinikos Kreanga in the final, claiming the title of Grand Finals champion.

Chuang won his first singles title on the Pro Tour at the Brazil Open in 2003, and reached No. 3, the highest world ranking of his career, at the end of the year. He advanced to the quarter-finals in the 2004 Athens Olympics, ending the Games with a loss to Wang Hao. In the men's doubles, he and teammate Chiang Peng-lung reached the last 16, where they were beaten by Błaszczyk and Krzeszewski of Poland.

In July 2008, his own table tennis stadium, Chih Yuan The Ping-Pong Stadium, opened in Kaohsiung, Taiwan. At that year's Olympics, he was beaten in the third round by Yang Zi of Singapore. He reached the bronze medal match four years later at the 2012 Summer Olympics, where he lost to Dimitrij Ovtcharov.

In May 2013, in the 52nd World Table Tennis Championships held in Paris, France, Chuang Chih-yuan and Chen Chien-an defeated Hao Shuai and Ma Lin 9–11, 12–10, 11–6, 13–11, 9–11, 11–8 in the final, and won the men's doubles title. Chuang and Chen became the first athletes in Taiwan to win any World Table Tennis Championships titles. In the following year, Chuang helped Chinese Taipei men's team reach semifinals at the World Team Table Tennis Championships, making Taiwanese record in the men's team event.

In September 2019 he announced he will not play anymore for the Chinese Taipei national team. It was stated that the main reason for his decision was disagreement with the Chinese Taipei association in that he wants to focus on singles competition and leave a position to youngsters in team events. Chuang returned to the team in 2020, and participated in the Summer Olympics for the fifth time. He continued to compete in international tournaments after the Tokyo Olympics. In 2022, Chuang clinched the men's singles title at one of the WTT Feeder tournaments at the age of 41.

In 2024, Chuang helped the Chinese Taipei men's team reach the semifinals at the 2024 World Team Championships for the second time in his career. After his sixth Olympic appearance in Paris, Chuang announced his retirement.

== Career summary ==
Singles (as of 27 January 2015):

- Olympics: semi-finals (2012)
- World Championships: round of 16 (2003, 2007)
- World Cup appearances: 10. Best record: quarter-finals (2006, 10)
- ITTF World Tour titles: 4 (Brazil 2003, Chile 2011, Spanish Open 2012 and Hungarian Open 2016). Runner-up: 10 (Qatar, Japan, Dutch Open 2002; Danish Open 2003; USA, Japan Open 2004; Singapore Open 2006; Austrian, German Open 2008; Hungarian Open 2010)
- ITTF World Tour Grand Finals appearances: 12. Won in 2002.
- Asian Games: runner-up (2002).

== Awards ==
- Best Male Athlete Award 2003 and 2012 from Sports Affairs Council, Executive Yuan, Taiwan.
- 41st Ten Outstanding Young Persons (2003) from Ten Outstanding Young Persons' Foundation Co., Taiwan.

== Personal life ==
On 27 October 2012, Chuang married Gladys Shi in his home town of Kaohsiung, Taiwan.
