= Chen Chiu-tan =

Taiwanese table tennis player

Personal information
- Nationality: Taiwanese
- Born: 16 September 1974 (age 51)

Sport
- Sport: Table tennis

Chen Chiu-tan (Chinese: 陳秋丹; born 16 September 1974) is a Taiwanese table tennis player. She competed in the women's singles event at the 1996 Summer Olympics.
