= 2005 Asian Table Tennis Championships =

- Date: 27 August – 2 September 2005
- Edition: 17th
- Location: Seogwipo, Jeju-do, South Korea
- Venue: International Convention Center Jeju

Champions

Men's singles
- (China) Wang Liqin

Women's singles
- (Hong Kong) Lin Ling

Men's doubles
- (Hong Kong) Ko Lai Chak / (Hong Kong) Li Ching

Women's doubles
- (China) Guo Yan / (China) Liu Shiwen

Mixed doubles
- (China) Wang Liqin / (China) Guo Yue

Men's team
- China

Women's team
- Hong Kong
- Asian Table Tennis Championships

The 17th Asian Table Tennis Championships 2005 were held in Seogwipo, Jeju-do, South Korea, from 27 August to 2 September 2005. It was organised by the Korea Table Tennis Association under the authority of Asian Table Tennis Union (ATTU) and International Table Tennis Federation (ITTF).

== Medal summary ==
=== Medal table ===
* Host nation (South Korea)

Rank	Nation	Gold	Silver	Bronze	Total
1	China	4	2	4	10
2	Hong Kong	3	3	2	8
3	South Korea*	0	2	3	5
4	Japan	0	0	3	3
5	Chinese Taipei	0	0	1	1
5	Singapore	0	0	1	1
Totals (6 entries)		7	7	14	28

=== Events ===
Event	Gold	Silver	Bronze
Men's singles	(China) Wang Liqin	(Hong Kong) Li Ching	(China) Hao Shuai
Men's singles	(China) Wang Liqin	(Hong Kong) Li Ching	(South Korea) Choi Hyun-jin
Women's singles	(Hong Kong) Lin Ling	(Hong Kong) Lau Sui-fei	(China) Niu Jianfeng
Women's singles	(Hong Kong) Lin Ling	(Hong Kong) Lau Sui-fei	(Singapore) Li Jiawei
Men's doubles	(Hong Kong) Ko Lai Chak (Hong Kong) Li Ching	(China) Chen Qi (China) Wang Liqin	(South Korea) Choi Hyun-jin (South Korea) Ryu Seung-min
Men's doubles	(Hong Kong) Ko Lai Chak (Hong Kong) Li Ching	(China) Chen Qi (China) Wang Liqin	(South Korea) Lee Jung-woo (South Korea) Oh Sang-eun
Women's doubles	(China) Guo Yan (China) Liu Shiwen	(China) Guo Yue (China) Niu Jianfeng	(Hong Kong) Tie Yana (Hong Kong) Zhang Rui
Women's doubles	(China) Guo Yan (China) Liu Shiwen	(China) Guo Yue (China) Niu Jianfeng	(Japan) Ai Fujinuma (Japan) Ai Fukuhara
Mixed doubles	(China) Wang Liqin (China) Guo Yue	(Hong Kong) Ko Lai Chak (Hong Kong) Zhang Rui	(China) Ma Long (China) Li Xiaoxia
Mixed doubles	(China) Wang Liqin (China) Guo Yue	(Hong Kong) Ko Lai Chak (Hong Kong) Zhang Rui	(Japan) Kaii Yoshida (Japan) Haruna Fukuoka
Men's team	China	South Korea	Chinese Taipei
Men's team	China	South Korea	Hong Kong
Women's team	Hong Kong	South Korea	China
Women's team	Hong Kong	South Korea	Japan

== See also ==
- 2005 World Table Tennis Championships
- 2005 Asian Cup Table Tennis Tournament
