= Tsui Hsiu-li =

Taiwanese table tennis player

Personal information
- Nationality: Taiwanese
- Born: 21 May 1973 (age 52)

Sport
- Sport: Table tennis

Tsui Hsiu-li (born 21 May 1973) is a Taiwanese table tennis player. She competed in the women's doubles event at the 2000 Summer Olympics.
