= 2009 Asian Table Tennis Championships =

- Date: 16–22 November 2009
- Edition: 19th
- Location: Lucknow, India
- Venue: U.P. Badminton Academy

Champions

Men's singles
- (China) Ma Long

Women's singles
- (China) Ding Ning

Men's doubles
- (China) Ma Long / (China) Xu Xin

Women's doubles
- (China) Ding Ning / (China) Li Xiaoxia

Mixed doubles
- (China) Ma Long / (China) Li Xiaoxia

Men's team
- China

Women's team
- China
- Asian Table Tennis Championships

The 2009 Asian Table Tennis Championships were held in Lucknow, India, from 16 to 22 November 2009.

== Medal summary ==
=== Medal table ===
Rank	Nation	Gold	Silver	Bronze	Total
1	China	7	4	5	16
2	Japan	0	1	2	3
2	South Korea	0	1	2	3
4	Singapore	0	1	1	2
5	Hong Kong	0	0	3	3
6	Chinese Taipei	0	0	1	1
Totals (6 entries)		7	7	14	28

=== Events ===
Event	Gold	Silver	Bronze
Men's singles	(China) Ma Long	(China) Zhang Jike	(China) Wang Liqin
Men's singles	(China) Ma Long	(China) Zhang Jike	(China) Xu Xin
Women's singles	(China) Ding Ning	(China) Li Xiaoxia	(China) Fan Ying
Women's singles	(China) Ding Ning	(China) Li Xiaoxia	(China) Liu Shiwen
Men's doubles	(China) Ma Long (China) Xu Xin	(China) Wang Liqin (China) Zhang Jike	(Hong Kong) Cheung Yuk (Hong Kong) Li Ching
Men's doubles	(China) Ma Long (China) Xu Xin	(China) Wang Liqin (China) Zhang Jike	(Japan) Kenta Matsudaira (Japan) Koki Niwa
Women's doubles	(China) Ding Ning (China) Li Xiaoxia	(South Korea) Kim Kyung-ah (South Korea) Park Mi-young	(South Korea) Dang Ye-seo (South Korea) Park Young-sook
Women's doubles	(China) Ding Ning (China) Li Xiaoxia	(South Korea) Kim Kyung-ah (South Korea) Park Mi-young	(Singapore) Feng Tianwei (Singapore) Yu Mengyu
Mixed doubles	(China) Ma Long (China) Li Xiaoxia	(China) Zhang Jike (China) Ding Ning	(China) Xu Xin (China) Liu Shiwen
Mixed doubles	(China) Ma Long (China) Li Xiaoxia	(China) Zhang Jike (China) Ding Ning	(Japan) Seiya Kishikawa (Japan) Ai Fukuhara
Men's team	China	Japan	Chinese Taipei
Men's team	China	Japan	Hong Kong
Women's team	China	Singapore	Hong Kong
Women's team	China	Singapore	South Korea
