= Asian Table Tennis Championships =

Biennial table tennis tournament

- Status: Active
- Genre: Table tennis championship
- Frequency: Annual
- Location: Asia
- Inaugurated: 1972; 54 years ago
- Most recent: 2025 Bhubaneswar (India)
- Previous event: 2024 Astana (Kazakhstan)
- Next event: 2026 Tashkent (Uzbekistan)
- Organiser: Asian Table Tennis Union
- 2026 Asian Table Tennis Championships

The Asian Table Tennis Championships is a biennial table tennis tournament that the International Table Tennis Federation regards as a continental championship. From 1952 to 1972, the tournament was organized by the Table Tennis Federation of Asia. The Asian Table Tennis Union started its own Asian Championships due to a split between national table tennis associations in Asia.

== Editions ==
#	Year	Host	Events
TTFA Championships (1952–1970)
1	1952	Singapore	7
2	1953	Tokyo, Japan	7
3	1954	Singapore	7
4	1957	Manila, Philippines	7
5	1960	Bombay, India	7
6	1963	Manila, Philippines	7
7	1964	Seoul, South Korea	7
8	1967	Singapore	7
9	1968	Jakarta, Indonesia	7
10	1970	Nagoya, Japan	7
ATTU Championships (Since 1972)
1	1972	Beijing, China	7
2	1974	Yokohama, Japan	7
3	1976	Pyongyang, North Korea	7
4	1978	Kuala Lumpur, Malaysia	7
5	1980	Calcutta, India	7
6	1982	Jakarta, Indonesia	7
7	1984	Islamabad, Pakistan	7
8	1986	Shenzhen, China	7
9	1988	Niigata, Japan	7
10	1990	Kuala Lumpur, Malaysia	7
11	1992	New Delhi, India	7
12	1994	Tianjin, China	7
13	1996	Kallang, Singapore	7
14	1998	Osaka, Japan	7
15	2000	Doha, Qatar	7
16	2003	Bangkok, Thailand	7
17	2005	Jeju-do, South Korea	7
18	2007	Yangzhou, China	7
19	2009	Lucknow, India	7
20	2011	Macau	7
21	2013	Busan, South Korea	7
22	2015	Pattaya, Thailand	7
23	2017	Wuxi, China	7
24	2019	Yogyakarta, Indonesia	7
25	2021	Doha, Qatar	7
26	2023	Pyeongchang, South Korea	7
27	2024	Astana, Kazakhstan	7
28	2025	Bhubaneswar, India	2
29	2026	Tashkent, Uzbekistan	7
30	2028	Pyongyang, North Korea	

== Medal table ==
Total Medals from 1972 to 2026
Rank	Nation	Gold	Silver	Bronze	Total
1	China	143	90	113.5	346.5
2	Japan	24	30	75	129
3	South Korea	15	29	59	103
4	North Korea	8	19	30	57
5	Hong Kong	5	12	39.5	56.5
6	Chinese Taipei	2	10	25	37
7	Singapore	1	8	11	20
8	India	0	0	8	8
9	Malaysia	0	0	2	2
10	Vietnam	0	0	1	1
Totals (10 entries)		198	198	364	760

== See also ==
- World Table Tennis Championships
- Asian Cup
- Asian Junior Championships
- List of table tennis players
