= Table tennis at the 2014 Asian Games – Women's singles =

Women's singles at the 2014 Asian Games
- Venue: Suwon Gymnasium
- Dates: 29 September – 4 October 2014
- Competitors: 40 from 22 nations

Medalists
gold medal	Liu Shiwen	China
silver medal	Zhu Yuling	China
bronze medal	Yang Ha-eun	South Korea
bronze medal	Feng Tianwei	Singapore

The women's singles table tennis event was part of the table tennis programme and took place between September 29 and October 4, at the Suwon Gymnasium.

== Schedule ==
All times are Korea Standard Time (UTC+09:00)

Date	Time	Event
Monday, 29 September 2014	11:30	1st round
Wednesday, 1 October 2014	14:00	2nd round
Thursday, 2 October 2014	10:00	2nd round
Thursday, 2 October 2014	12:00	3rd round
Thursday, 2 October 2014	20:00	Quarterfinals
Saturday, 4 October 2014	10:00	Semifinals
Saturday, 4 October 2014	12:00	Final

== Results ==
Legend

- WO — Won by walkover

=== Finals ===
Quarterfinals
1	Liu Shiwen (CHN)	11	11	11	11
7	Lee Ho Ching (HKG)	8	3	7	7
8	Yang Ha-eun (KOR)	9	11	11	11	11
4	Kasumi Ishikawa (JPN)	11	6	5	9	7
3	Zhu Yuling (CHN)	11	11	11	11
5	Suh Hyo-won (KOR)	4	3	8	8
6	Ai Fukuhara (JPN)	9	9	6	11	11	11	6
2	Feng Tianwei (SIN)	11	11	11	7	3	8	11

Semifinals
1	Liu Shiwen (CHN)	11	11	11	11
8	Yang Ha-eun (KOR)	3	5	1	7
3	Zhu Yuling (CHN)	13	13	14	11
2	Feng Tianwei (SIN)	11	11	12	8

Final
1	Liu Shiwen (CHN)	11	11	13	11
3	Zhu Yuling (CHN)	6	4	11	7

=== Top half ===
==== Section 1 ====
1st round						2nd round						3rd round
						1	Liu Shiwen (CHN)	11	11	11	11
						30	Sengdavieng Douangpanya (LAO)	4	3	1	7
												1	Liu Shiwen (CHN)	11	11	6	11	11
17	Suthasini Sawettabut (THA)	11	11	11	11							14	Ri Mi-gyong (PRK)	9	8	11	9	4
	Noora Al-Abri (QAT)	2	4	6	6	17	Suthasini Sawettabut (THA)	12	8	5	6
						14	Ri Mi-gyong (PRK)	14	11	11	11

==== Section 2 ====
1st round							2nd round						3rd round
							11	Lin Ye (SIN)	W	O
	Aisha Iqbal Ansari (PAK)	5	11	5	9	7	23	Batsaikhany Batkhishig (MGL)
23	Batsaikhany Batkhishig (MGL)	11	9	11	11	11							11	Lin Ye (SIN)	7	8	11	12	7	8
													7	Lee Ho Ching (HKG)	11	11	7	10	11	11
							21	Neda Shahsavari (IRI)	5	2	6	8
							7	Lee Ho Ching (HKG)	11	11	11	11

==== Section 3 ====
1st round							2nd round						3rd round
							8	Yang Ha-eun (KOR)	11	11	11	11
							27	Maryam Al-Qasimi (BRN)	3	1	4	6
													8	Yang Ha-eun (KOR)	12	4	11	14	6	8	11
32	Mueena Mohamed (MDV)	11	11	8	11	12							12	Cheng I-ching (TPE)	10	11	8	12	11	11	8
	Fajir Mohammad (KUW)	4	6	11	8	10	32	Mueena Mohamed (MDV)	2	2	5	1
							12	Cheng I-ching (TPE)	11	11	11	11

==== Section 4 ====
1st round								2nd round						3rd round
								16	Manika Batra (IND)	11	11	11	11
	Kajol Rauniyar (NEP)	10	7	11	11	6	2	22	Ma Chao In (MAC)	7	4	9	6
22	Ma Chao In (MAC)	12	11	9	7	11	11							16	Manika Batra (IND)	9	6	7	8
														4	Kasumi Ishikawa (JPN)	11	11	11	11
								18	Beh Lee Wei (MAS)	1	4	6	9
								4	Kasumi Ishikawa (JPN)	11	11	11	11

=== Bottom half ===
==== Section 5 ====
1st round						2nd round								3rd round
						3	Zhu Yuling (CHN)	11	11	11	11
						24	Lee Rou You (MAS)	5	3	2	3
														3	Zhu Yuling (CHN)	11	15	11	11
19	Ankita Das (IND)	11	11	11	11									10	Ng Wing Nam (HKG)	4	13	3	9
	Menwah Al-Shammari (KUW)	4	9	3	9	19	Ankita Das (IND)	8	5	11	7	11	4
						10	Ng Wing Nam (HKG)	11	11	4	11	9	11

==== Section 6 ====
1st round									2nd round						3rd round
									9	Ri Myong-sun (PRK)	11	11	11	11
	Lara Kejebachian (LIB)	6	12	12	8	11	4	11	28	Aya Majdi (QAT)	2	3	4	1
28	Aya Majdi (QAT)	11	10	10	11	8	11	13							9	Ri Myong-sun (PRK)	14	10	11	7	5	13	8
															5	Suh Hyo-won (KOR)	12	12	6	11	11	11	11
									26	Rahila Kashif (PAK)	3	3	4	2
									5	Suh Hyo-won (KOR)	11	11	11	11

==== Section 7 ====
1st round									2nd round						3rd round
									6	Ai Fukuhara (JPN)	11	11	11	11
									25	Nabita Shrestha (NEP)	2	1	2	2
															6	Ai Fukuhara (JPN)	10	11	8	11	11	7	11
29	Thiphakone Southamavong (LAO)	11	8	11	9	6	12	5							13	Lee I-chen (TPE)	12	4	11	6	3	11	6
	Fathimath Jumana Nimal (MDV)	8	11	6	11	11	10	11		Fathimath Jumana Nimal (MDV)	1	3	5	5
									13	Lee I-chen (TPE)	11	11	11	11

==== Section 8 ====
1st round									2nd round						3rd round
									15	Nanthana Komwong (THA)	11	11	11	11
	Barkhasyn Enkhjin (MGL)	12	11	11	9	7	3	13		Barkhasyn Enkhjin (MGL)	9	4	5	4
20	Cheong Cheng I (MAC)	10	7	9	11	11	11	11							15	Nanthana Komwong (THA)	11	4	6	7	5
															2	Feng Tianwei (SIN)	8	11	11	11	11
									31	Yuliya Ryabova (KAZ)	1	4	4	5
									2	Feng Tianwei (SIN)	11	11	11	11
