= Feng Tianwei =

Singaporean table tennis player (born 1986)

Feng Tianwei PJG
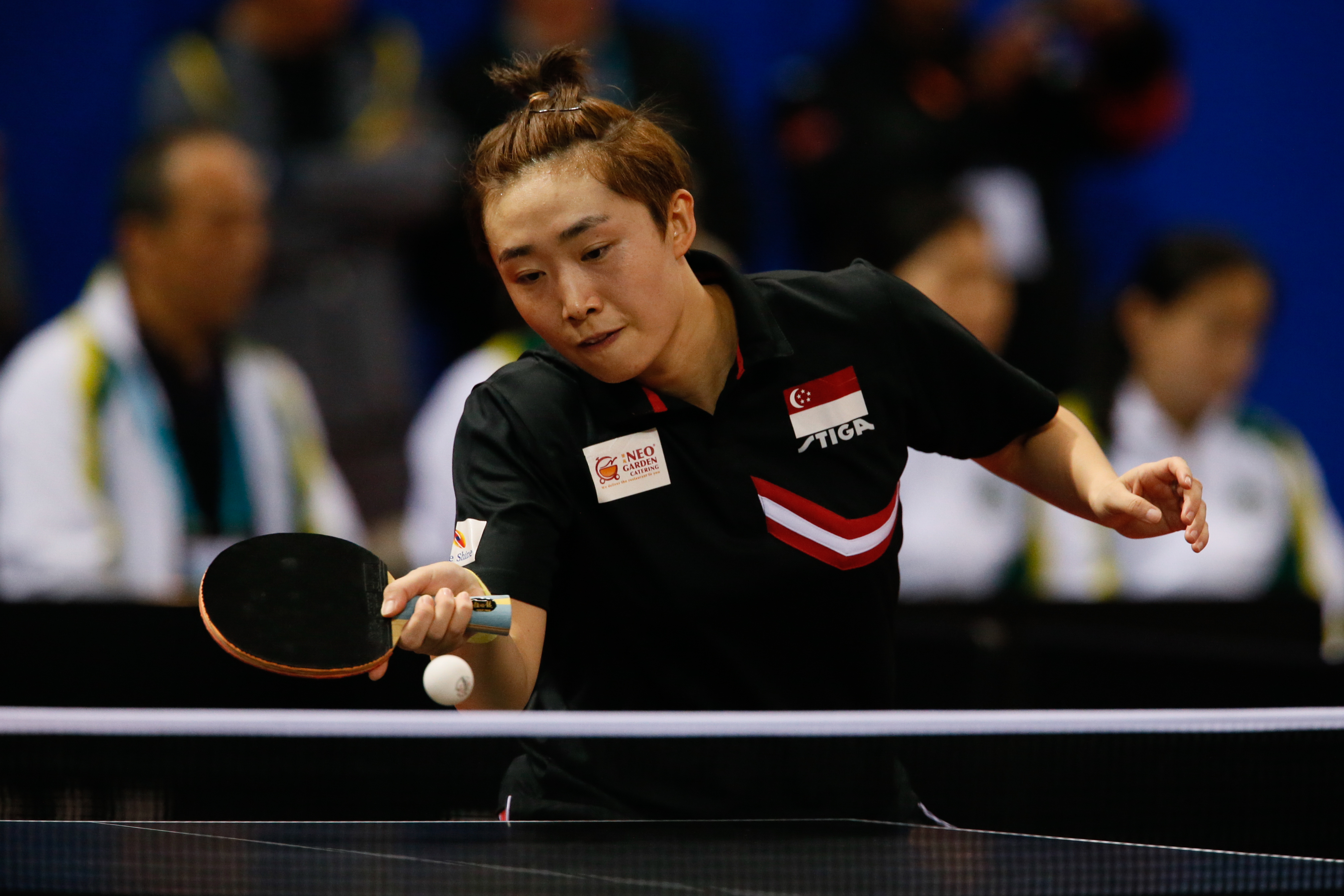
- Feng in 2017

Personal information
- Native name: 冯天薇
- Nationality: Singapore
- Born: 31 August 1986 (age 40) Harbin, Heilongjiang, China
- Height: 1.64 m (5 ft 5 in)

Sport
- Sport: Table tennis
- Playing style: Right-handed shakehand grip
- Equipment: Butterfly Zhang Jike Blade
- Highest ranking: 2 (April – September 2010, August 2011)
Medal record
Women's Table Tennis
Representing Singapore
Event	1st	2nd	3rd
Olympic Games	0	1	2
World Championships	1	2	4
World Cup	0	2	7
Asian Games	0	1	2
Asian Championships	0	2	4
Asian Cup	1	1	2
Commonwealth Games	9	3	1
Southeast Asian Games	8	5	1
Total	19	17	23
Olympic Games
Silver medal – second place	2008 Beijing	Team
Bronze medal – third place	2012 London	Singles
Bronze medal – third place	2012 London	Team
World Championships
Gold medal – first place	2010 Moscow	Team
Silver medal – second place	2008 Guangzhou	Team
Silver medal – second place	2012 Dortmund	Team
Bronze medal – third place	2013 Paris	Doubles
Bronze medal – third place	2014 Tokyo	Team
Bronze medal – third place	2015 Suzhou	Doubles
Bronze medal – third place	2017 Düsseldorf	Doubles
World Cup
Silver medal – second place	2009 Linz	Team
Silver medal – second place	2010 Dubai	Team
Bronze medal – third place	2008 Kuala Lumpur	Singles
Bronze medal – third place	2011 Magdeburg	Team
Bronze medal – third place	2013 Guangzhou	Team
Bronze medal – third place	2013 Kobe	Singles
Bronze medal – third place	2015 Dubai	Team
Bronze medal – third place	2016 Philadelphia	Singles
Bronze medal – third place	2019 Chengdu	Singles
ITTF World Tour (Only Champion & Runner-up are listed)
Gold medal – first place	2008 Berlin	Team
Gold medal – first place	2008 Warsaw	Singles
Gold medal – first place	2009 Seoul	Singles
Gold medal – first place	2010 Grand Finals	Singles
Gold medal – first place	2011 Incheon	Singles
Gold medal – first place	2011 Kobe	Singles
Gold medal – first place	2012 Grand Finals	Doubles
Gold medal – first place	2014 Subic Bay	Singles
Gold medal – first place	2014 Sydney	Singles
Gold medal – first place	2014 Yokohama	Singles
Gold medal – first place	2016 Otocec	Singles
Gold medal – first place	2017 Incheon	Singles
Silver medal – second place	2007 Taipei	Singles
Silver medal – second place	2008 Yokohama	Team
Silver medal – second place	2008 Warsaw	Doubles
Silver medal – second place	2010 Seoul	Singles
Silver medal – second place	2011 Shenzhen	Singles
Silver medal – second place	2012 Santos	Singles
Silver medal – second place	2013 Kuwait	Singles
Silver medal – second place	2014 Incheon	Singles
Silver medal – second place	2014 Yokohama	Doubles
Silver medal – second place	2015 De Haan	Singles
Silver medal – second place	2015 Warsaw	Doubles
Asian Games
Silver medal – second place	2010 Guangzhou	Team
Bronze medal – third place	2014 Incheon	Singles
Bronze medal – third place	2014 Incheon	Team
Asian Championships
Silver medal – second place	2009 Lucknow	Team
Silver medal – second place	2011 Macau	Team
Bronze medal – third place	2009 Lucknow	Doubles
Bronze medal – third place	2013 Busan	Team
Bronze medal – third place	2015 Pattaya	Singles
Bronze medal – third place	2019 Yogyakarta	Team
Asian Cup
Gold medal – first place	2015 Jaipur	Singles
Silver medal – second place	2008 Sapporo	Singles
Bronze medal – third place	2010 Guangzhou	Singles
Bronze medal – third place	2016 Dubai	Singles
Commonwealth Games
Gold medal – first place	2010 Delhi	Singles
Gold medal – first place	2010 Delhi	Team
Gold medal – first place	2014 Glasgow	Singles
Gold medal – first place	2014 Glasgow	Doubles
Gold medal – first place	2014 Glasgow	Team
Gold medal – first place	2018 Gold Coast	Doubles
Gold medal – first place	2022 Birmingham	Singles
Gold medal – first place	2022 Birmingham	Doubles
Gold medal – first place	2022 Birmingham	Team
Silver medal – second place	2010 Delhi	Doubles
Silver medal – second place	2010 Delhi	Mixed doubles
Silver medal – second place	2018 Gold Coast	Team
Bronze medal – third place	2018 Gold Coast	Singles
Southeast Asian Games
Gold medal – first place	2009 Vientiane	Singles
Gold medal – first place	2009 Vientiane	Team
Gold medal – first place	2011 Jakarta-Palembang	Singles
Gold medal – first place	2011 Jakarta-Palembang	Doubles
Gold medal – first place	2015 Singapore	Team
Gold medal – first place	2017 Kuala Lumpur	Singles
Gold medal – first place	2017 Kuala Lumpur	Doubles
Gold medal – first place	2017 Kuala Lumpur	Team
Silver medal – second place	2009 Vientiane	Doubles
Silver medal – second place	2009 Vientiane	Mixed doubles
Silver medal – second place	2011 Jakarta-Palembang	Mixed doubles
Silver medal – second place	2015 Singapore	Doubles
Silver medal – second place	2019 Philippines	Singles
Bronze medal – third place	2019 Philippines	Doubles

Feng Tianwei PJG (Chinese: 冯天薇; pinyin: Féng Tiānwēi, pronounced [fə̌ŋ tjɛ́nwéi]; born 31 August 1986) is a Chinese-born former Singaporean retired table tennis player. Born in China, she permanently moved to Singapore in March 2007 at the age of 20 under the Foreign Sports Talent Scheme and commenced her international career in competitive table tennis the following month.

Feng represented Singapore for the first time in the Olympic Games at the 2008 Summer Olympics in Beijing. On 15 August 2008, the Singapore team comprising Feng and her teammates Li Jiawei and Wang Yuegu defeated South Korea 3–2 in the semifinals. The team lost to China in the final, obtaining the silver medal. This was Singapore's first Olympic medal in 48 years and its first as an independent nation.

At the 2012 Summer Olympics in London, Feng defeated Kasumi Ishikawa of Japan 4–0 to win the women's singles bronze medal, Singapore's first Olympic singles medal since the 1960 Summer Olympics. She would later win the bronze medal at the women's team event with Li and Wang against South Korea. This was the first time Singapore had won two medals at an Olympic Games.

On 15 March 2015, Feng defeated Zhu Yuling and Liu Shiwen at the 2015 Asian Cup in Jaipur to be crowned Asian Cup Champion for the first time. At the same time, she broke China's 7 consecutive years of dominance in this tournament.

On 25 October 2016, the Singapore Table Tennis Association announced that it would not be renewing its contract with Feng, citing the need for rejuvenation of the national team. However, STTA has confirmed to support her for future international competitions if she meets the selection criteria. A few months after her exit from STTA, she went on to beat then world number one and Olympic gold medalist Ding Ning 3–2 in the Chinese Table Tennis Super League.

On 11 October 2019, Feng defeated Chen Meng, then ranked world number one, in four straight games, causing the biggest upset in the 2019 German Open.

== Early years ==
Feng was born on 31 August 1986 in Harbin, Heilongjiang, People's Republic of China. She is the only daughter of Feng Qingzhi, a granary worker, and his wife Li Chunping, an employee of a department store. Feng's parents, who were poor, lived frugally for years to pay for her table tennis training. Her father suffered from multiple sclerosis, but she was not told how severe his illness was. He died in 2002, weeks before Feng tried out for China's national B squad. Although Feng topped the qualifying matches a month later and was called up for the national team in 2003, she suffered from a long illness; a source close to her said it was "because she missed her father too much". Feng left China in 2005 to play in the Japanese professional league. While there she was spotted by Liu Guodong, then a coach with the Singapore Table Tennis Association, in 2006. In March 2007 she was invited to train in Singapore under the Foreign Sports Talent Scheme. She became a Singapore citizen in January 2008.

== Career ==
Feng made her international début for Singapore in June 2007 as an under-21 player at the International Table Tennis Federation (ITTF) Pro Tour Volkswagen Korean Open. As a singles player, Feng was ranked 73rd in the world in August 2007.

In 2007, she achieved a silver medal in the singles at the ITTF Pro Tour Chinese Taipei Open, her compatriot Li beating her to take the gold.

Feng was a member of the silver medal-winning team at the World Team Championships in Guangzhou in 2008 and defeated the top seed Zhang Yining from China in the Quarter-finals of the Asian Cup held in Sapporo between 29 and 30 March 2008, eventually achieving second place behind China's Guo Yue. She rose to the top 10 world rankings within a year.

=== 2008 Summer Olympics ===
Feng represented Singapore for the first time at the 2008 Summer Olympics in the women's team tournament. She contributed to Singapore's 3–2 win against South Korea in the semifinals by defeating Dang Ye-Seo and Park Mi-Young in two singles matches. Feng's match against Park was closely fought, with Feng eventually overcoming Park 3–1. Singapore was assisted by the implementation of the expedite system when the game failed to be completed in ten minutes. The system unsettled Park, and Feng won two minutes after its introduction in the match when Park committed a service fault. Interviewed afterwards, Feng said: "I definitely did not expect that [Park's error]. It was a surprise and the best birthday present I've ever gotten."

On 17 August 2008, Feng and her teammates achieved a silver medal in women's table tennis after losing to China in three matches. Feng played the starting singles match, winning the first game but eventually losing to China's Wang Nan 1–3. This was the first time Singapore had won an Olympic medal since its independence in 1965. The medal came 48 years after Tan Howe Liang won the country's first medal, a silver in weightlifting in the lightweight category at the 1960 Summer Olympics in Rome.

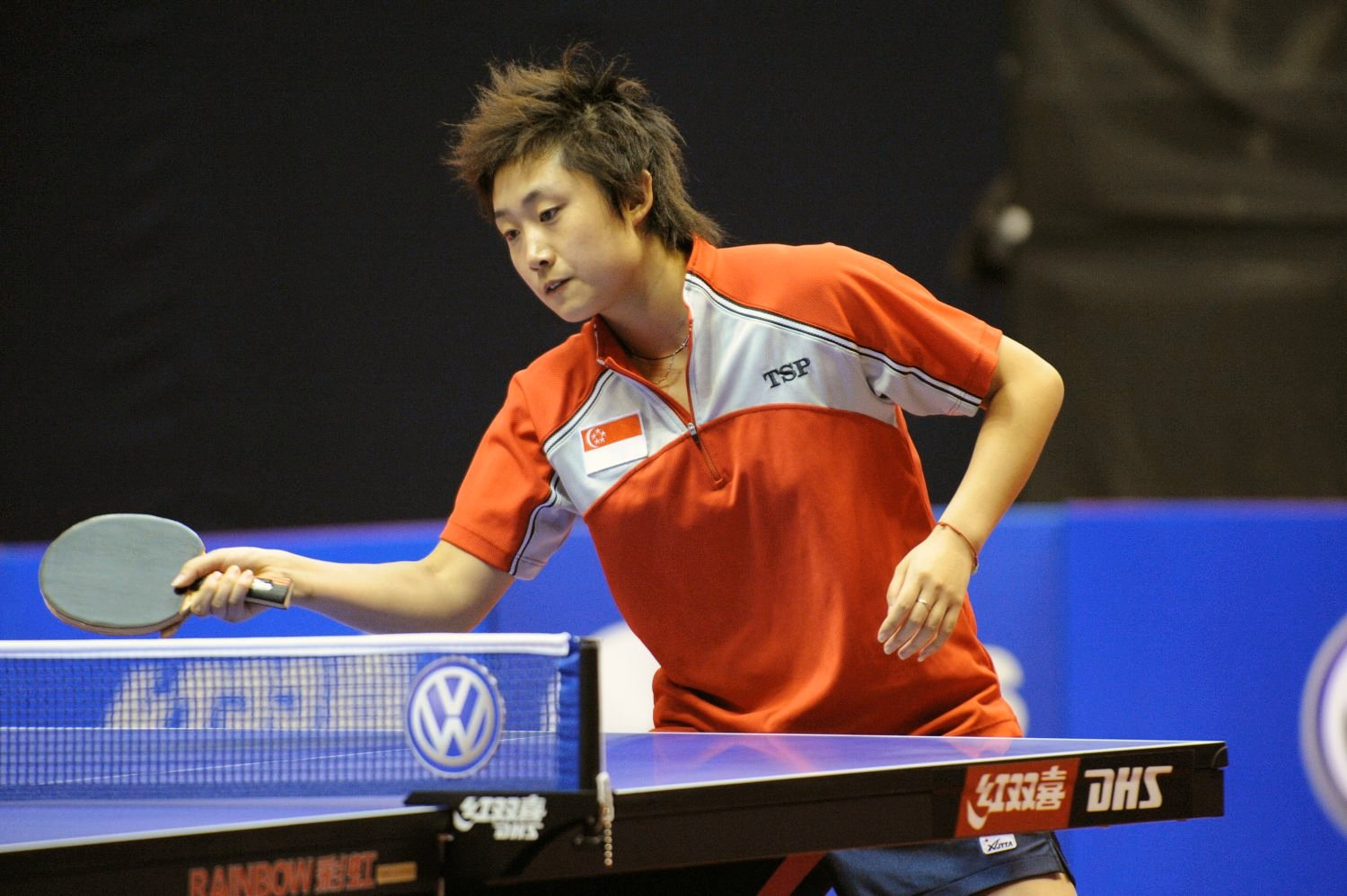
Feng in 2008

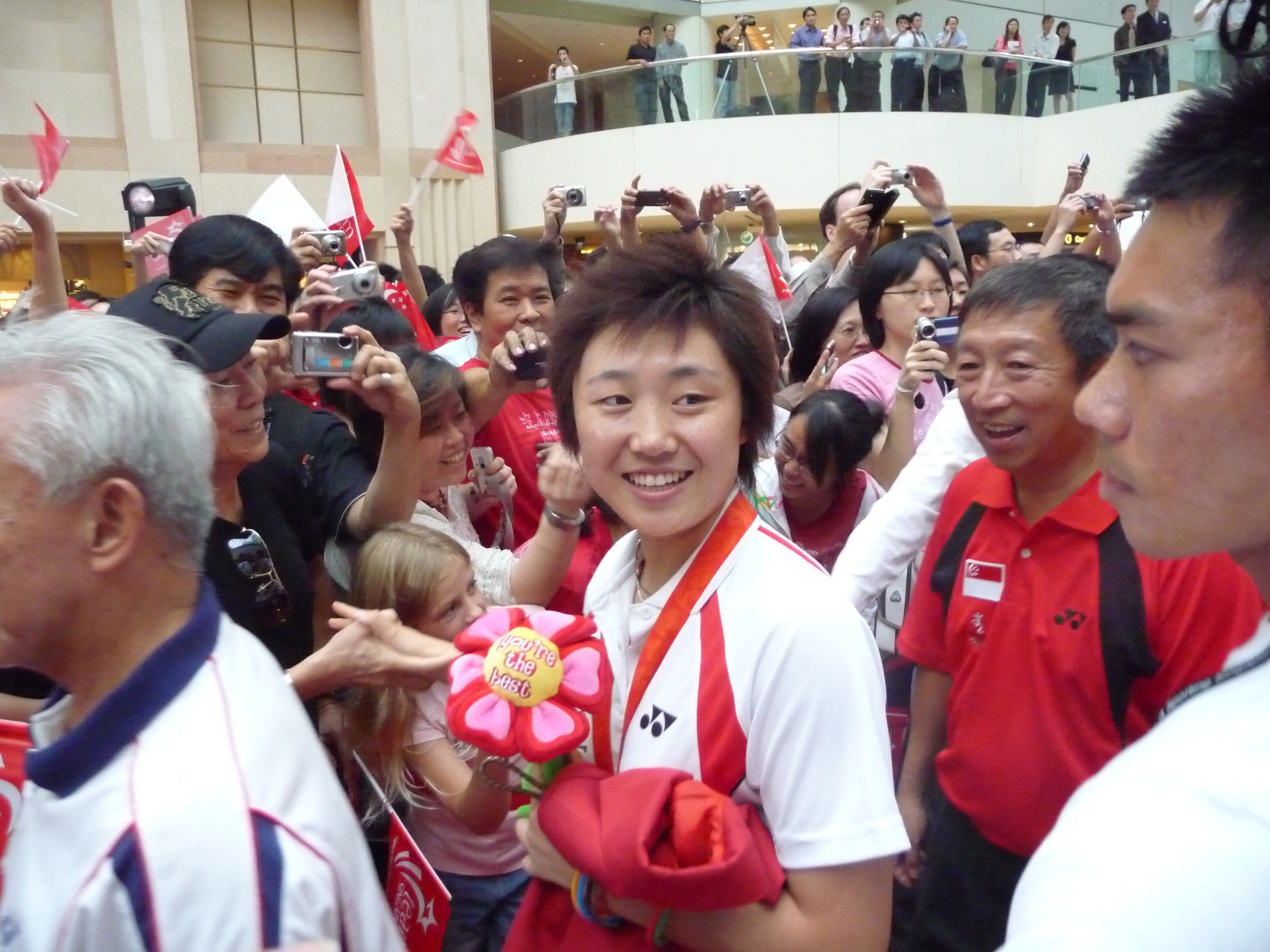
Feng at a ceremony on 25 August 2008 welcoming Team Singapore home from the 2008 Summer Olympics in Beijing

Feng received byes into the third round of the women's singles tournament. Feng defeated South Korea's Dang Ye-Seo 4–0 in the third round, Netherlands' Li Jie 4–1 in the fourth round, but fell 1–4 to China's Zhang Yining in the quarter-finals. Feng made the world number one work for her win, with the final scores being 11–13, 14–12, 12–14, 10–12, 11–13. According to the Straits Times, Zhang leveraged on her experience by stalling for time at crucial stages of the game, which broke Feng's rhythm. Interviewed after the match, Feng said: "I'm sure I'll win a medal at the next Olympics."

At a victory celebration in Singapore on 25 August 2008, Vivian Balakrishnan, the Minister for Community Development, Youth and Sports, announced that Feng, Li and Wang would be presented with the Pingat Jasa Gemilang (Meritorious Service Medal).

=== Competitions between 2008 and 2012 ===
On 9 September 2008, Feng beat her compatriot Wang to clinch the bronze medal at the ITTF Women's World Cup in Kuala Lumpur. Despite crashing out of the singles event earlier, Feng and her teammates Li and Wang won the top title at the ITTF Pro Tour ERKE German Open in Berlin on 22 November 2008. Feng won her first professional singles title at the Polish Open in Warsaw on 30 November 2008, in an all-Singapore final against Wang. Feng and Yu Mengyu also took silver in the doubles. On 2 December 2008, the ITTF announced that Feng was ranked sixth in the world. This made her the top Singapore female table tennis player and the highest-ranked player in the world not representing China. She was third in Today newspaper's list of athletes of the year for 2008.

On 23 August 2009, Feng achieved her second Pro Tour singles title at the KAL Cup Korean Open in Seoul.

Feng took part in the 25th Southeast Asian Games in Vientiane, Laos. She was a member of the Singapore women's team with Sun Beibei and Wang that defeated Thailand 3–0 to win Gold on 10 December 2009. On 14 December 2009, she and her partner Wang were defeated by compatriots Sun and Yu in an all-Singapore final in the women's doubles. The following day, in her maiden appearance at the Games, she achieved gold in the singles competition after defeating Wang 4–1.

The Singapore Table Tennis Association made Feng the inaugural winner of its Best Player of the Year award on 12 February 2010. As of 8 April 2010, she had worked her way up to a second-place ranking in the world. On 3 May 2010, the Singapore National Olympic Council named her Sportswoman of the Year for 2009. The national table tennis women's team, composed of Feng, Li, Wang and Sun were awarded the Team of the Year prize at the Singapore Sports Awards.

Together with Sun and Wang, Feng was a member of the team at the Liebherr World Team Table Tennis Championships in Moscow that defeated China, 17-time winner and the reigning world champion, with a score of 3–1. In the two games she played, Feng defeated Liu Shiwen and Ding Ning, ranked number one and four in the world respectively and Wang contributing another point to the team by defeating Liu Shiwen. This was the first time Singapore had lifted the Corbillon cup.

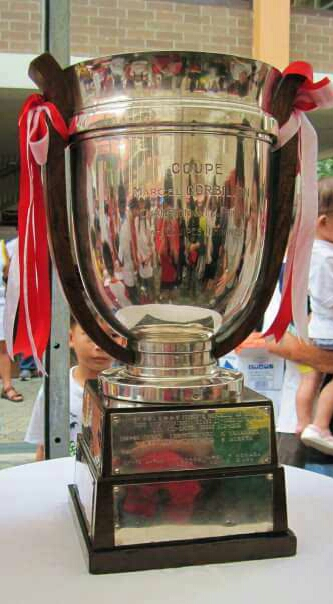
Corbillon cup display during victory parade in June 2010

=== 2012 Summer Olympics ===
Feng represented Singapore at the 2012 Summer Olympics in London, and was the nation's flagbearer at the Parade of Nations segment of the opening ceremony. She entered the women's singles competition seeded sixth, and progressed until she was defeated 2–4 by China's Ding Ning in the semi-finals. She won against Kasumi Ishikawa of Japan 4–0 (11–9, 11–6, 11–6, 11–5) to take the bronze medal, becoming the second Singaporean to win an individual Olympic medal. Interviewed after her win, Feng said: "I'm really happy, although I feel it's come a little too suddenly. My form wasn't very good lately, so I didn't dare to carry too much expectations coming into the London Olympics. It was just a relief to win."

Feng also participated in the women's team competition with Li and Wang. They were beaten 0–3 by Japan in the semifinals, but took the bronze medal by edging out South Korea 3–0. Feng defeated Kim Kyung Ah 11–9, 11–8, 4–11, 13–11, Li also successfully fended off Seok Ha Jung 11–5, 11–8, 6–11, 11–8. Li and Wang then succeeded in the doubles game against Seok and Dang Ye Seo 11–9, 11–6, 6–11, 11–5. This marked the first time Singapore had won more than one medal at an Olympic Games. Feng commented: "Against Japan, we gave ourselves too much pressure and lost the psychological battle. After that, I told myself that I must prepare myself well mentally and it's only when I do what I'm capable of that I can win."

Singles Event

Date	Round	Result	Opponent	Score	Individual Sets					
–	1st	Bye								
–	2nd	Bye								
29 July	3rd	Win	(Chinese Taipei) Chen Szu-yu	4–1	11–6	11–13	11–5	12–10	11–9	–
30 July	4th	Win	(Germany) Wu Jiaduo	4–2	11–6	7–11	11–5	9–11	11–6	11–6
31 July	Quarter-Final	Win	(South Korea) Kim Kyungah	4–2	13–11	11–7	4–11	11–6	10–12	12–10
31 July	Semi-Final	Loss	(China) Ding Ning	2–4	7–11	4–11	11–9	10–12	11–6	6–11
1 August	Bronze Medal match	Win	(Japan) Kasumi Ishikawa	4–0	11–9	11–6	11–6	11–5	–	–

Team Event

Date	Round	Result	Opponent	Score
3 August	Round of 16	Win	Poland	3–1
4 August	Quarter-Final	Win	DPR Korea	3–0
5 August	Semi-Final	Loss	Japan	0–3
7 August	Bronze Medal match	Win	South Korea	3–0

=== 2013 ===
Feng participated in many tournaments in 2013, achieving commendable results in several competitions. Notable ones include the Kuwait Open, 2013 World Table Tennis Championships and the 2013 Women's World Cup.

2013 Kuwait Open

Feng participated in the 2013 Kuwait Open as the fourth seed in the women singles competition. She ended up as the runner-up, losing out to China's Liu Shiwen. In the semifinals, Feng, then world ranked 6th, stunned then world number one Ding Ning from China in an epic encounter that finished 4–3 in favour of Feng.

Date	Round	Result	Opponent	Score	Individual Sets						
16 February	Round of 32	Win	(South Korea) Kang Mi-soon	4–2	11–6	8–11	11–4	11–8	11–13	11–8	–
17 February	Round of 16	Win	(Belarus) Viktoria Pavlovich	4–1	11–6	19–17	11–3	6–11	11–7	–	–
17 February	Quarterfinals	Win	(Japan) Kasumi Ishikawa	4–1	11–9	13–11	9–11	11–7	11–8	–	–
18 February	Semifinals	Win	(China) Ding Ning	4–3	11–8	5–11	5–11	12–10	11–9	8–11	11–3
18 February	Final	Loss	(China) Liu Shiwen	2–4	11–4	11–13	8–11	2–11	11–3	8–11	–

2013 World Table Tennis Championships

Feng qualified for the women singles event of the 2013 World Table Tennis Championships as the fourth seed. She progressed to the quarterfinals as one of the only remaining players outside of China, before losing out to China's fifth seeded Zhu Yuling. She also participated in the women's doubles event with Yu Mengyu. Feng and Yu impressively secured the joint bronze medal alongside Chinese pair Chen Meng and Zhu Yuling.

Singles

Date	Round	Result	Opponent	Score	Individual Sets					
15 May	Round of 128	Win	(Romania) Iulia Necula	4–1	4–11	11–8	11–6	11–4	11–6	–
15 May	Round of 64	Win	(Japan) Misaki Morizono	4–2	11–8	4–11	6–11	11–8	11–8	11–8
16 May	Round of 32	Win	(Japan) Shiho Matsudaira	4–0	11–6	11–6	12–10	11–3	–	–
17 May	Round of 16	Win	(Ukraine) Tetyana Bilenko	4–2	11–8	11–6	9–11	7–11	11–8	11–9
18 May	Quarterfinals	Loss	(China) Zhu Yuling	0–4	7–11	5–11	6–11	7–11	–	–

Doubles (with Yu Mengyu)

Date	Round	Result	Opponent	Score	Individual Sets						
15 May	Round of 64	Win	(Italy) L Ridolfi / N Stefanova	4–1	6–11	11–8	11–6	11–8	11–7	–	–
16 May	Round of 32	Win	(Ukraine) T Bilenko / G Gapanova	4–3	5–11	10–12	11–8	7–11	11–2	11–4	11–4
17 May	Round of 16	Win	(Japan) K Ishikawa / M Morizono	4–1	11–7	11–5	11–7	8–11	11–7	–	–
17 May	Quarterfinals	Win	(Japan) A Fukuhara / S Hirano	4–0	11–7	11–6	11–3	11–8	–	–	–
19 May	Semifinals	Loss	(China) Y Guo / X Li	2–4	12–10	7–11	7–11	4–11	11–9	8–11	–

2013 Women's World Cup

Feng participated in the 2013 Women's World Cup and progressed to the semifinals, before losing out to Wu Yang of China. However, she defeated Hong Kong's Jiang Huajun in the bronze medal playoff, thereby attaining the bronze medal.

Date	Round	Result	Opponent	Score	Individual Sets						
22 September	Quarterfinals	Win	(Japan) Kasumi Ishikawa	4–3	11–7	9–11	8–11	11–9	11–4	9–11	11–7
23 September	Semifinals	Loss	(China) Wu Yang	1–4	8–11	11–8	8–11	7–11	10–12	–	–
23 September	Bronze medal match	Win	(Hong Kong) Jiang Huajun	4–0	11–6	13–11	12–10	11–2	–	–	–

=== 2014 ===
Feng notched impressive results in 2014, winning several titles such as the Philippines Open, Australia Open, and most notably, Japan Open titles. She also attained the runner-up position in the Korea Open.

Feng also impressed at the 2014 Commonwealth Games, winning the gold medal in the Women's singles event, Women's doubles event with Yu Mengyu, and the Women's team event, alongside teammates Yu Mengyu, Lin Ye, Zhou Yihan and Isabelle Li.

At the 2014 Asian Games, Feng secured two bronzes, one in the Women's singles event and the other in the Women's team event. Feng also led the Singapore Women's team to a bronze medal in the 2014 World Team Table Tennis Championships.

At the year-end ITTF Star Awards, Feng was nominated for the Female Table Tennis Star award, alongside star players Ding Ning, Liu Shiwen and Kasumi Ishikawa.

2014 World Team Table Tennis Championships

Feng led the Singapore women's team comprising Yu Mengyu, Isabelle Li and Yee Herng Hwee to a bronze medal in the 2014 World Team Table Tennis Championships. Impressively, Feng won 10 out of 11 matches that she played throughout the tournament, losing only to China's Li Xiaoxia in the semifinals.

Overall Team results

Date	Round	Result	Opponent	Score
28 April	Group Stage	Win	Luxembourg	3–0
29 April	Group Stage	Win	Russia	3–1
29 April	Group Stage	Win	Netherlands	3–1
30 April	Group Stage	Win	South Korea	3–1
1 May	Group Stage	Win	France	3–1
3 May	Quarterfinals	Win	Romania	3–1
4 May	Semifinals	Loss	China	0–3

Individual breakdown of Feng's matches

Date	Round	Result	Opponent	Score	Individual Sets				
28 April	Group Stage	Win	(Luxembourg) Sarah De Nutte	3–1	11–3	9–11	11–7	11–6	–
29 April	Group Stage	Win	(Russia) Elena Troshneva	3–1	4–11	11–4	11–4	13–11	–
29 April	Group Stage	Win	(Russia) Maria Dolgikh	3–0	11–6	11–8	12–10	–	–
29 April	Group Stage	Win	(Netherlands) Li Jie	3–0	11–5	11–9	11–9	–	–
29 April	Group Stage	Win	(Netherlands) Li Jiao	3–1	8–11	11–5	12–10	11–9	–
30 April	Group Stage	Win	(South Korea) Yang Ha-eun	3–2	5–11	11–8	11–6	9–11	11–7
30 April	Group Stage	Win	(South Korea) Suh Hyo-won	3–1	12–10	8–11	11–5	12–10	–
1 May	Group Stage	Win	(France) Carole Grundisch	3–1	13–11	12–10	9–11	11–4	–
3 May	Quarterfinals	Win	(Romania) Monteiro Dodean Daniela	3–0	12–10	11–8	11–9	–	–
3 May	Quarterfinals	Win	(Romania) Elizabeta Samara	3–0	11–8	11–5	11–9	–	–
4 May	Semifinals	Loss	(China) Li Xiaoxia	1–3	11–8	8–11	5–11	7–11	–

2014 Korea Open

Feng participated in the 2014 Korea Open and advanced all the way to the finals, where she lost to Germany's Han Ying. On route to the final, she notably defeated China's rising star Wang Manyu, as well as teammate Yu Mengyu.

Date	Round	Result	Opponent	Score	Individual Sets						
13 June	Round of 32	Win	(France) Li Xue	4–0	11–7	11–4	11–8	11–6	–	–	–
14 June	Round of 16	Win	(Germany) Shan Xiaona	4–2	11–5	7–11	11–2	4–11	11–9	11–7	–
14 June	Quarterfinals	Win	(China) Wang Manyu	4–3	11–4	11–5	7–11	11–9	6–11	6–11	11–6
15 June	Semifinals	Win	(Singapore) Yu Mengyu	4–2	11–4	11–8	11–5	7–11	6–11	11–4	–
15 June	Final	Loss	(Germany) Han Ying	0–4	6–11	7–11	5–11	7–11	–	–	–

2014 Japan Open

Feng participated in the 2014 Japan Open, a Super Series tournament, and clinched the gold medal after defeating Japan's Kasumi Ishikawa in the final. It was Feng's third title of the year, having won the 2014 Philippines Open and 2014 Australia Open, and also a week after coming in second place in the 2014 Korea Open.

Date	Round	Result	Opponent	Score	Individual Sets					
20 June	Round of 32	Win	(South Korea) Kim Byeolnim	4–0	11–4	11–7	11–7	11–5	–	–
21 June	Round of 16	Win	(China) Chen Xingtong	4–1	11–8	11–5	11–5	7–11	11–8	–
21 June	Quarterfinals	Win	(Japan) Misako Wakamiya	4–0	11–9	11–5	11–8	11–6	–	–
22 June	Semifinals	Win	(Sweden) Li Fen	4–1	11–7	12–14	11–3	11–7	12–10	–
22 June	Final	Win	(Japan) Kasumi Ishikawa	4–2	12–10	9–11	3–11	11–3	11–5	13–11

2014 Asian Games

Feng participated in the Women's singles and Women's team event at the 2014 Asian Games. She managed to clinch the bronze medal in the singles event, and managed to lead the Singapore women's team to a bronze medal at the women's team event.

Singles event

Date	Round	Result	Opponent	Score	Individual Sets						
1 October	Round of 32	Win	(Kazakhstan) Yuliya Ryabova	4–0	11–1	11–4	11–4	11–5	–	–	–
2 October	Round of 16	Win	(Thailand) Nanthana Komwong	4–1	8–11	11–4	11–6	11–7	11–5	–	–
2 October	Quarterfinals	Win	(Japan) Ai Fukuhara	4–3	11–9	11–9	11–6	7–11	3–11	8–11	11–6
4 October	Semifinals	Loss	(China) Zhu Yuling	0–4	11–13	11–13	12–14	8–11	–	–	–

Team event

Date	Round	Result	Opponent	Score
27 September	Group Stage	Win	Qatar	3–0
27 September	Group Stage	Win	Chinese Taipei	3–2
28 September	Group Stage	Win	Thailand	3–0
28 September	Quarterfinals	Win	India	3–0
29 September	Semifinals	Loss	Japan	2–3

=== 2016 Summer Olympics ===
Feng participated in ITTF Asian-Olympics Qualifier (South-East Asian region) at Hong Kong from 13 to 17 April 2016. She was the winner for SEA group and was given a direct entry to the singles event at Rio de Janeiro Olympics, her third Olympics appearance. In the qualifier match, She defeated Nanthana Komwong in the Quarter-Finals, Suthasini Sawettabut in Semi-Finals & Yu in the Finals.

According to July world ranking published by ITTF, Feng was seeded second in Olympics singles. This was her highest-ever Olympic seeding. The team consisting of herself, Yu and Zhou was seeded fourth. She reached the singles Quarter-Final but lost to Ai Fukuhara of Japan in 4 straight games. Feng, Yu and Zhou reached the semi-final of the team event but lost to China 0–3. In the bronze medal match, the trio was defeated by Japan 1–3.

Singles Event

Date	Round	Result	Opponent	Score	Individual Sets					
–	1st	Bye								
–	2nd	Bye								
8 August	3rd	Win	(Luxembourg) Ni Xialian	4–2	8–11	5–11	11–8	11–5	11–4	11–5
8 August	4th	Win	(Austria) Liu Jia	4–1	11–6	11–6	11–7	6–11	11–4	–
9 August	Quarter-Final	Loss	(Japan) Ai Fukuhara	0–4	12–14	8–11	7–11	5–11	–	–

Team Event

Date	Round	Result	Opponent	Score
12 August	Round of 16	Win	Egypt	3–0
13 August	Quarter-Final	Win	South Korea	3–2
15 August	Semi-Final	Loss	China	0–3
16 August	Bronze Medal match	Loss	Japan	1–3

=== 2019 Women's World Cup ===
Feng defeated Bernadette Szőcs and Kasumi Ishikawa before losing to Zhu Yuling, 4–0, 4–3, and 2–4 respectively. She took the bronze medal after defeating Lily Zhang with a 4–1 score.

Date	Round	Result	Opponent	Score	Individual Sets						
19 October	Round of 16	Win	(Romania) Bernadette Szőcs	4–0	11–8	12–10	11–8	11–8	–	–	–
19 October	Quarterfinals	Win	(Japan) Kasumi Ishikawa	4–3	12–10	7–11	11–8	8–11	8–11	12–10	11–7
20 October	Semifinals	Loss	(China) Zhu Yuling	2–4	1–11	13–11	11–9	5–11	5–11	5–11	–
20 October	3rd place	Win	(United States) Lily Zhang	4–1	11–6	11–8	11–8	5–11	15–13	–	–

=== 2020 Women's World Cup ===
In the first ITTF event since the hiatus caused by the coronavirus pandemic, Feng was upset by Zhang. However, she later beat Zhang in a rematch in WTT Macau.

=== 2020 Summer Olympics ===
The 2020 Summer Olympics was Feng's fourth appearance at the Olympic Games, having participated in the 2008, 2012 and 2016 Olympic Games, winning a silver medal and a bronze medal in the Team Event in the 2008 Summer Olympics and 2012 Summer Olympics respectively, as well as a singles bronze in 2012. According to July's Olympic Qualification Ranking published by the International Table Tennis Federation, Feng was seeded sixth in the singles event.

Feng received a bye in Round 1 and Round 2 due to her seeding. In Round 3, she defeated Spain's María Xiao, coming from 0–1 down to win 4–1. In the Round of 16, Feng faced Germany's Han Ying, an opponent she had not defeated before in all her previous four international encounters. Han won a tight first game 13–11, followed by an equally close 11–7 and 11–9 victory in games two and three, putting her 3–0 up. Feng fought back and took the next game 11–8 and led 7–3 in the fifth, but was unable to close out the game, which Han eventually won 11–8. Despite a valiant effort, Feng's singles campaign ended in a 1–4 defeat to Han Ying in the Round of 16.

In the team event, Feng, together with Yu Mengyu and Lin Ye, defeated 13th seeded France 3–0 in the Round of 16, progressing to the quarterfinals. In the second match, Feng made a comeback from 0–2 down to win 3–2 against Prithika Pavade. In the quarterfinals, the 6th seeded Singapore team was handed an unfavourable draw against favourites China, the top seed and eventual gold medallists in the Women's Team event. In the first match (doubles), Yu and Lin lost 0–3 (5–11, 7–11, 5–11) to Chen Meng and Wang Manyu. In the second match, a close first and third game saw Feng lose 0–3 (8–11, 3–11, 8–11) to Sun Yingsha, who was the silver medallist in the Singles event. Olympics debutant Lin then lost the third match to Wang (11–6, 9–11, 6–11, 5–11), after a solid first game win. This wrapped up a 3–0 victory for China and signalled the end of Singapore's Table Tennis campaign in the 2020 Summer Olympics. It also marked the end of Feng Tianwei's Olympic table tennis career.

Singles Event

Date	Round	Result	Opponent	Score	Individual Sets				
–	1st	Bye							
–	2nd	Bye							
26 July	3rd	Win	(Spain) María Xiao	4–1	8–11	12–10	11–5	11–2	11–4
27 July	4th	Loss	(Germany) Han Ying	1–4	11–13	7–11	9–11	11–8	8–11

Team Event

Date	Round	Result	Opponent	Score
2 August	Round of 16	Win	France	3–0
3 August	Quarter-Final	Loss	China	0–3

=== 2021 ===
In March, Feng played at WTT Doha. She suffered an early-round upset in WTT Contender, but made it to the finals in the WTT Star Contender event, where she lost to Mima Ito of Japan. As a result of her finals run, Feng passed Kasumi Ishikawa in projected Olympic seeding and put herself in a strong position to take the Olympic fourth seed from Cheng I-ching.

=== 2022 ===
Feng took part in the 2022 Commonwealth Games held in Birmingham. She won three golds in the women's team, singles and doubles events. In the singles event, she came back from three sets down to beat compatriot Zeng Jian 4–3 in an all-Singapore final. She partnered Zeng Jian to defeat the Australian duo Jee Minhyung and Jian Fang Lay 3–0 in the finals.

Feng was also awarded the David Dixon Award, presented to the Commonwealth Games athlete who showcases an exceptional level of performance, commitment and fair play. She is the first Singaporean to win this award.

=== Post competitive playing ===
Feng retired from competitive playing in 2022. She joined SportSG's sport development group, where it was reported that she would work on the development of sport pathways for children and youths, particularly in table tennis. The work there was on a part-time basis for the next two years as she furthered her studies, pursuing a master’s degree in sport industry management at Beijing’s Peking University. She then worked as an assistant director in SportSG and was the principal of its ActiveSG Table Tennis Academy. In 2026, she opened her own table tennis academy in Fernvale, Singapore.

== Major tournament performance timeline ==
Key
W	F	SF	QF	#R	RR

(W) won; (F) finalist; (SF) semi-finalist; (QF) quarter-finalist; (#R) rounds 4, 3, 2, 1; (RR) round-robin stage; (S) singles event; (WD) Women's doubles event; (XD) mixed doubles event; (T) team event.

Tournament		2008	2009	2010	2011	2012	2013	2014	2015	2016	2017	2018	2019	2020	2021	2022
World Championships	S		QF		QF		QF		QF		QF		4R		3R	
World Championships	WD		QF		3R		SF		SF		SF		A		A	
World Championships	XD		4R		A		3R		A		A		A		A	
World Championships	T	F		W		F		SF		QF		R16		NH		A
Olympic Games	S	QF				SF-B				QF				4R		
Olympic Games	T	F-S				SF-B				SF-4th				QF		
World Cup	S															
World Cup	T															

== Key career records ==
Legend : Gold Silver Bronze QR: Qualifying Round

Event	Results	Date	Competition
2007
Women's singles		26 August 2007	ITTF Pro Tour Chinese Taipei Open
U21 Singles		14 December 2007	Volkswagen Pro Tour Grand Finals; Beijing, China
2008
Women's Team (With Li Jiawei, Wang Yuegu, Sun Beibei & Yu Mengyu)		1 March 2008	Evergrande Real Estate World Team Table Tennis Championships; Guangzhou, China
Women's singles		30 March 2008	2008 Asian Cup; Sapporo, Japan
Women's Team (With Li Jiawei & Wang Yuegu)		17 August 2008	2008 Summer Olympics; Beijing, China
Women's singles	Quarter-Finalist	21 August 2008	2008 Summer Olympics; Beijing, China
Women's singles		9 September 2008	2008 Women's World Cup; Kuala Lumpur, Malaysia
Women's Team (With Li Jiawei & Wang Yuegu)		22 November 2008	ITTF Pro Tour ERKE German Open; Berlin, Germany
Women's singles (Maiden World Tour Singles Title)		30 November 2008	ITTF Pro Tour Polish Open; Warsaw, Poland
Women's doubles (With Yu Mengyu)		30 November 2008	ITTF Pro Tour Polish Open; Warsaw, Poland
Women's doubles (With Yu Mengyu)	Quarter-Finalist	11 December 2008	ITTF World Tour Grand Finals; Macau
Women's singles	Semi-Finalist	14 December 2008	ITTF World Tour Grand Finals; Macau
2009
Mixed doubles (With Gao Ning)	Round of 16	1 May 2009	H.I.S. World Table Tennis Championships; Yokohama, Japan
Women's singles	Quarter-Finalist	3 May 2009	H.I.S. World Table Tennis Championships; Yokohama, Japan
Women's doubles (With Wang Yuegu)	Quarter-Finalist	3 May 2009	H.I.S. World Table Tennis Championships; Yokohama, Japan
Women's singles	4th	12 October 2009	2009 Women's World Cup; Guangzhou, China
Women's Team (With Wang Yuegu, Li Jiawei, Sun Beibei & Yu Mengyu)		25 October 2009	2009 World Team Cup; Linz, Austria
Women's Team (With Sim Kaixin Zena, Sun Beibei, Wang Yuegu & Yu Mengyu)		10 December 2009	25th Southeast Asian Games; Vientiane, Laos
Women's doubles (With Wang Yuegu)		14 December 2009	25th Southeast Asian Games; Vientiane, Laos
Mixed doubles (With Gao Ning)		14 December 2009	25th Southeast Asian Games; Vientiane, Laos
Women's singles		15 December 2009	25th Southeast Asian Games; Vientiane, Laos
Women's singles	Semi-Finalist	10 January 2010	ITTF World Tour Grand Finals; Macau
2010
Women's singles		28 March 2010	2010 Asian Cup; Guangzhou, China
Women's singles		30 March 2010	Volkswagen 2010 Cup; Guangzhou, China
Women's Team (With Li Jiawei, Sun Beibei, Wang Yuegu & Yu Mengyu)		30 May 2010	LIEBHERR World Team Table Tennis Championships; Moscow, Russia
Women's singles	QR	25 September 2010	2010 Women's World Cup; Kuala Lumpur, Malaysia
Women's Team (With Li Jiawei, Sun Beibei, Wang Yuegu & Yu Mengyu)		1 October 2010	2010 World Team Cup; Dubai, United Arab Emirates
Women's Team (With Li Jiawei, Sun Beibei, Wang Yuegu & Yu Mengyu)		8 October 2010	2010 Commonwealth Games; New Delhi, India
Mixed doubles (with Gao Ning)		12 October 2010	2010 Commonwealth Games; New Delhi, India
Women's singles		13 October 2010	2010 Commonwealth Games; New Delhi, India
Women's doubles (With Wang Yuegu)		14 October 2010	2010 Commonwealth Games; New Delhi, India
Women's Team (With Li Jiawei, Sun Beibei, Wang Yuegu & Yu Mengyu)		16 November 2010	2010 Asian Games; Guangzhou, China
Women's singles	Quarter-Finalist	18 November 2010	2010 Asian Games; Guangzhou, China
Women's doubles (With Wang Yuegu)	Quarter-Finalist	17 December 2010	ITTF World Tour Grand Finals; Seoul, South Korea
Women's singles		19 December 2010	ITTF World Tour Grand Finals; Seoul, South Korea
2011
Women's singles	Quarter-Finalist	23 March 2011	Volkswagen Cup 2011; Guangzhou, China
Women's doubles (With Wang Yuegu)	Round of 16	12 May 2011	GAC GROUP World Table Tennis Championships; Rotterdam, Netherlands
Women's singles	Quarter-Finalist	13 May 2011	GAC GROUP World Table Tennis Championships; Rotterdam, Netherlands
Women's singles	4th	30 October 2011	2011 Women's World Cup; Singapore
Women's Team (With Li Jiawei, Wang Yuegu, Sun Beibei & Yu Mengyu)		5 November 2011	2011 World Team Cup; Magdeburg, Germany
Women's doubles (With Sun Beibei)		15 November 2011	26th Southeast Asian Games; Palembang, Indonesia
Women's singles		16 November 2011	26th Southeast Asian Games; Palembang, Indonesia
Women's singles	Quarter-Finalist	25 November 2011	ITTF World Tour Grand Finals; London, United Kingdom
2012
Women's Team (with Li Jiawei, Wang Yuegu, Sun Beibei & Yu Mengyu)		1 April 2012	LIEBHERR World Team Table Tennis Championships; Dortmund, Germany
Women's singles		1 August 2012	2012 Summer Olympics; London, United Kingdom
Women's Team (with Li Jiawei & Wang Yuegu)		7 August 2012	2012 Summer Olympics; London, United Kingdom
Women's singles	4th	23 September 2012	2012 Women's World Cup; Huangshi, China
Women's singles	Semi-Finalist	9 December 2012	ITTF World Tour Grand Finals; Hangzhou, China
Women's doubles (with Yu Mengyu )		9 December 2012	ITTF World Tour Grand Finals; Hangzhou, China
2013
Women's Team (with Yu Mengyu, Li Siyun Isabelle & Yee Herng Hwee)		30 March 2013	2013 World Team Cup; Guangzhou, China
Mixed doubles (With Gao Ning)	Round of 32	16 May 2013	LIEBHERR World Table Tennis Championships; Paris, France
Women's singles	Quarter-Finalist	18 May 2013	LIEBHERR World Table Tennis Championships; Paris, France
Women's doubles (with Yu Mengyu)		19 May 2013	LIEBHERR World Table Tennis Championships; Paris, France
Women's singles		23 September 2013	2013 Women's World Cup; Kobe, Japan
Women's singles	Quarter-Finalist	9 January 2014	ITTF World Tour Grand Finals; Dubai, United Arab Emirates
Women's doubles (With Yu Mengyu)	Quarter-Finalist	11 January 2014	ITTF World Tour Grand Finals; Dubai, United Arab Emirates
2014
Women's Team (With Yu Mengyu, Li Siyun Isabelle & Yee Herng Hwee)		4 May 2014	ZEN-NOH World Team Table Tennis Championships; Tokyo, Japan
Women's Team (With Yu Mengyu, Lin Ye, Zhou Yihan & Li Siyun Isabelle)		27 July 2014	2014 Commonwealth Games; Glasgow, Scotland
Women's singles		1 August 2014	2014 Commonwealth Games; Glasgow, Scotland
Women's doubles (With Yu Mengyu)		2 August 2014	2014 Commonwealth Games; Glasgow, Scotland
Women's Team (With Yu Mengyu, Lin Ye, Zhou Yihan & Li Siyun Isabelle)		29 September 2014	2014 Asian Games; Incheon, South Korea
Women's singles		4 October 2014	2014 Asian Games; Incheon, South Korea
Women's singles	Quarter-Finalist	13 December 2014	ITTF World Tour Grand Finals; Bangkok, Thailand
2015
Women's Team (With Yu Mengyu, Li Siyun Isabelle, Lim Eunice & Zhang Wanling)		10 January 2015	2015 World Team Cup; Dubai, United Arab Emirates
Women's singles		15 March 2015	2015 Asian Cup; Jaipur, India
Women's singles	Quarter-Finalist	1 May 2015	QOROS World Table Tennis Championships; Suzhou, China
Women's doubles (With Yu Mengyu)		3 May 2015	QOROS World Table Tennis Championships; Suzhou, China
Women's doubles (With Yu Mengyu)		2 June 2015	28th Southeast Asian Games; Singapore
Women's singles	QR	4 June 2015	28th Southeast Asian Games; Singapore
Women's Team (With Yu Mengyu, Lin Ye, Zhou Yihan & Li Siyun Isabelle)		8 June 2015	28th Southeast Asian Games; Singapore
Women's singles		2 October 2015	Suzuki Asian Championships; Pattaya, Thailand
Women's singles	Round of 16	31 October 2015	2015 Women's World Cup; Sendai, Japan
Women's singles	Round of 16	11 December 2015	ITTF World Tour Grand Finals; Lisbon, Portugal
2016
Women's Team (With Yu Mengyu, Li Siyun Isabelle, Yee Herng Hwee & Zhang Wanling)	Quarter-Finalist	4 March 2016	PERFECT World Team Table Tennis Championships; Kuala Lumpur, Malaysia
Women's singles	Winner	14 April 2016	ITTF-Asian Olympics Qualification (South-East Asia region); Hong Kong
Women's singles		30 April 2016	2016 Asian Cup; Dubai, United Arab Emirates
Women's singles	Quarter-Finalist	9 August 2016	2016 Summer Olympics; Rio de Janeiro, Brazil
Women's Team	4th	17 August 2016	2016 Summer Olympics; Rio de Janeiro, Brazil
Women's singles		9 October 2016	2016 Women's World Cup; Philadelphia, USA
Women's singles	Round of 16	9 December 2016	ITTF World Tour Grand Finals; Doha, Qatar
2017
Women's Team (With Eunice Lim, Tan En Hui, Wong Xinru & Zhang Wanling)	8th	10 April 2017	Seamaster Asian Championships; Wuxi, China
Women's singles	Quarter-Finalist	14 April 2017	Seamaster Asian Championships; Wuxi, China
Women's singles	Quarter-Finalist	3 June 2017	Liebherr World Table Tennis Championships; Düsseldorf, Germany
Women's doubles (With Yu Mengyu)		5 June 2017	Liebherr World Table Tennis Championships; Düsseldorf, Germany
Women's doubles (With Yu Mengyu)		20 August 2017	29th Southeast Asian Games; Kuala Lumpur, Malaysia
Women's singles		22 August 2017	29th Southeast Asian Games; Kuala Lumpur, Malaysia
Women's Team (With Yu Mengyu, Lin Ye, Zhou Yihan & Yee Herng Hwee)		26 August 2017	29th Southeast Asian Games; Kuala Lumpur, Malaysia
Women's singles	Quarter-Finalist	15 December 2017	ITTF World Tour Grand Finals; Astana, Kazakhstan
2018
Women's Team (With Yu Mengyu, Yee Herng Hwee & Zhang Wanling)	Quarter-Finalist	24 February 2018	2018 World Team Cup; London, England
Women's Team (With Yu Mengyu, Zhou Yihan, Lin Ye & Zhang Wanling)		8 April 2018	2018 Commonwealth Games; Gold Coast, Australia
Women's doubles (With Yu Mengyu)		13 April 2018	2018 Commonwealth Games; Gold Coast, Australia
Women's singles		14 April 2018	2018 Commonwealth Games; Gold Coast, Australia
Women's Team (With Yu Mengyu, Lin Ye, Zhang Wanling & Pearlyn Koh)	Round of 16	2 May 2018	Liebherr World Team Table Tennis Championships; Halmstad, Sweden
Women's Team (With Yu Mengyu, Lin Ye, Zhang Wanling & Pearlyn Koh)	Quarter-Finalist	27 August 2018	2018 Asian Games; Jakarta, Indonesia
Women's singles	Round of 16	31 August 2018	2018 Asian Games; Jakarta, Indonesia
Women's singles	Round of 16	13 December 2018	2018 ITTF World Tour Grand Finals; Incheon, South Korea
2019
Women's singles	Round of 16	24 April 2019	Liebherr 2019 ITTF World Championships; Budapest, Hungary
Women's Team (With Yu Mengyu, Lin Ye, Wong Xin Ru & Goi Rui Xuan)		17 September 2019	2019 Asian Table Tennis Championships; Yogyakarta, Indonesia
Women's singles	Quarter-Finalist	20 September 2019	2019 Asian Table Tennis Championships; Yogyakarta, Indonesia
Women's singles		20 October 2019	2019 Women's World Cup; Chengdu, China
Women's doubles		7 December 2019	2019 Southeast Asian Games; Subic Bay, Philippines
Women's singles		10 December 2019	2019 Southeast Asian Games; Subic Bay, Philippines
Women's singles	Round of 16	12 December 2019	2019 ITTF World Tour Grand Finals; Zhengzhou, China
2020
Women's singles	Round of 16	8 November 2020	2020 Women's World Cup; Weihai, China
Women's singles	Round of 16	19 November 2020	Bank of Communications 2020 ITTF Finals; Zhengzhou, China
2021
Women's singles	Round of 16	27 July 2021	2020 Summer Olympics; Tokyo, Japan
Women's Team (With Yu Mengyu & Lin Ye)	Quarter-Finalist	3 August 2021	2020 Summer Olympics; Tokyo, Japan
Women's singles	Round of 32	26 November 2021	2021 World Table Tennis Championships Finals; Houston, USA
2022
Women's Team (With Zeng Jian, Zhou Jingyi & Wong Xinru)		1 August 2022	2022 Commonwealth Games; Birmingham, England
Women's Singles		7 August 2022	2022 Commonwealth Games; Birmingham, England
Women's Doubles (With Zeng Jian)		8 August 2022	2022 Commonwealth Games; Birmingham, England

== See also ==
- List of Singapore world champions in sports

Olympic Games
Preceded by Li Jiawei	Flagbearer for Singapore; London 2012	Succeeded by Derek Wong Zi Liang
