= Table tennis at the 2014 Asian Games – Women's team =

Women's team at the 2014 Asian Games
- Venue: Suwon Gymnasium
- Dates: 27–30 September 2014
- Competitors: 76 from 18 nations

Medalists
gold medal	China; Chen Meng, Ding Ning, Liu Shiwen, Wu Yang, Zhu Yuling
silver medal	Japan; Ai Fukuhara, Miu Hirano, Sayaka Hirano, Kasumi Ishikawa, Misako Wakamiya
bronze medal	North Korea; Kim Hye-song, Kim Jong, Kim Song-i, Ri Mi-gyong, Ri Myong-sun
bronze medal	Singapore; Feng Tianwei, Isabelle Li, Lin Ye, Yu Mengyu, Zhou Yihan

The women's team table tennis event was part of the table tennis programme and took place between September 27 and September 30, at the Suwon Gymnasium.

== Schedule ==
All times are Korea Standard Time (UTC+09:00)

Date	Time	Event
Saturday, 27 September 2014	10:00	Preliminary round 1
Saturday, 27 September 2014	14:00	Preliminary round 2
Saturday, 27 September 2014	18:00	Preliminary round 3
Sunday, 28 September 2014	10:00	Preliminary round 4
Sunday, 28 September 2014	14:00	Preliminary round 5
Sunday, 28 September 2014	20:00	Quarterfinals
Monday, 29 September 2014	19:30	Semifinals
Tuesday, 30 September 2014	14:00	Final

== Results ==
=== Preliminary round ===
==== Group A ====
Pos	Team	Pld	W	L	MF	MA	Pts	Qualification
1	China	3	3	0	9	0	6	Quarterfinals
2	India	3	2	1	6	3	5	Quarterfinals
3	Malaysia	3	1	2	3	6	4	
4	Nepal	3	0	3	0	9	3	

Source: OCA

27 September	China	3–0	Nepal

Chen Meng	3–0	Kajol Rauniyar	11–2, 11–2, 11–1
Wu Yang	3–0	Nabita Shrestha	11–2, 11–4, 11–5
Zhu Yuling	3–0	Elina Maharjan	11–1, 11–3, 11–2

27 September	India	3–0	Malaysia

Poulomi Ghatak	3–1	Beh Lee Wei	11–9, 15–17, 11–8, 11–5
Manika Batra	3–0	Ho Ying	11–5, 11–8 ,11–7
Neha Aggarwal	3–0	Lee Rou You	11–6, 11–6, 11–4

27 September	China	3–0	Malaysia

Ding Ning	3–0	Lee Rou You	11–4, 11–6, 11–2
Liu Shiwen	3–0	Beh Lee Wei	11–3, 11–5, 11–4
Wu Yang	3–0	Ho Ying	11–3, 11–8, 11–2

27 September	India	3–0	Nepal

Manika Batra	3–0	Nabita Shrestha	11–8, 11–5, 11–2
Madhurika Patkar	3–0	Kajol Rauniyar	11–5, 11–1, 11–5
Ankita Das	3–0	Elina Maharjan	11–6, 11–5, 11–2

28 September	China	3–0	India

Zhu Yuling	3–0	Neha Aggarwal	11–7, 11–5, 11–5
Liu Shiwen	3–0	Madhurika Patkar	11–4, 11–4, 11–2
Chen Meng	3–0	Manika Batra	11–8, 11–2, 11–4

28 September	Malaysia	3–0	Nepal

Lee Rou You	3–0	Rabina Maharjan	11–3, 11–5, 11–2
Ho Ying	3–0	Rita Maiya Prajapati	11–4, 11–7, 11–9
Beh Lee Wei	3–0	Nabita Shrestha	11–2, 11–4, 11–4

==== Group B ====
Pos	Team	Pld	W	L	MF	MA	Pts	Qualification
1	Singapore	3	3	0	9	2	6	Quarterfinals
2	Chinese Taipei	3	2	1	8	3	5	Quarterfinals
3	Thailand	3	1	2	3	6	4	
4	Qatar	3	0	3	0	9	3	

Source: OCA

27 September	Singapore	3–0	Qatar

Isabelle Li	3–0	Maha Faramarzi	11–8, 11–6, 11–5
Lin Ye	3–0	Aya Majdi	11–4, 11–3, 11–6
Zhou Yihan	3–0	Kholoud Abdulreda	11–8, 11–4, 11–6

27 September	Thailand	0–3	Chinese Taipei

Nanthana Komwong	1–3	Huang Yi-hua	5–11, 11–2, 4–11, 2–11
Suthasini Sawettabut	1–3	Cheng I-ching	10–12, 13–11, 5–11, 10–12
Tamolwan Khetkhuan	1–3	Lee I-chen	8–11, 11–9, 4–11, 7–11

27 September	Singapore	3–2	Chinese Taipei

Feng Tianwei	3–1	Huang Yi-hua	11–8, 11–5, 9–11, 11–6
Lin Ye	0–3	Cheng I-ching	3–11, 6–11, 6–11
Zhou Yihan	2–3	Chen Szu-yu	11–9, 9–11, 7–11, 12–10, 4–11
Feng Tianwei	3–0	Cheng I-ching	11–3, 11–5, 11–3
Lin Ye	3–1	Huang Yi-hua	5–11, 11–7, 11–7, 11–5

27 September	Thailand	3–0	Qatar

Nanthana Komwong	3–0	Aya Majdi	11–6, 11–4, 11–1
Suthasini Sawettabut	3–0	Kholoud Abdulreda	11–8, 11–7, 11–3
Tamolwan Khetkhuan	3–0	Maha Faramarzi	11–3, 11–3, 11–6

28 September	Singapore	3–0	Thailand

Feng Tianwei	3–0	Nanthana Komwong	11–7, 11–6, 11–8
Zhou Yihan	3–1	Suthasini Sawettabut	11–6, 11–2, 6–11, 11–9
Isabelle Li	3–1	Tamolwan Khetkhuan	10–12, 11–9, 11–8, 11–6

28 September	Chinese Taipei	3–0	Qatar

Lee I-chen	3–0	Kholoud Abdulreda	11–2, 11–3, 11–4
Liu Hsing-yin	3–0	Maha Faramarzi	11–9, 11–5, 11–7
Cheng I-ching	3–0	Aya Majdi	11–2, 11–4, 11–2

==== Group C ====
Pos	Team	Pld	W	L	MF	MA	Pts	Qualification
1	Japan	4	4	0	12	2	8	Quarterfinals
2	South Korea	4	3	1	11	3	7	Quarterfinals
3	Pakistan	4	2	2	6	6	6	
4	Mongolia	4	1	3	3	9	5	
5	Maldives	4	0	4	0	12	4	

Source: OCA

27 September	Japan	3–0	Maldives

Sayaka Hirano	3–0	Mueena Mohamed	11–2, 11–2, 11–3
Misako Wakamiya	3–0	Fathimath Jumana Nimal	11–2, 11–2, 11–1
Miu Hirano	3–0	Aminath Shiura Shareef	11–1, 11–1, 11–4

27 September	Mongolia	0–3	Pakistan

Barkhasyn Enkhjin	1–3	Rahila Kashif	11–9, 5–11, 9–11, 8–11
Batsaikhany Batkhishig	1–3	Shabnam Bilal	9–11, 11–4, 9–11, 10–12
Bat-Ölziin Sodbolor	2–3	Aisha Iqbal Ansari	7–11, 11–4, 11–9, 5–11, 5–11

27 September	South Korea	3–0	Maldives

Yang Ha-eun	3–0	Mueena Mohamed	11–4, 11–2, 11–2
Suh Hyo-won	3–0	Fathimath Jumana Nimal	11–4, 11–2, 11–3
Jeon Ji-hee	3–0	Aishath Nisa	11–3, 11–1, 11–4

27 September	Japan	3–0	Mongolia

Ai Fukuhara	3–0	Bat-Ölziin Sodbolor	11–0, 11–7, 11–1
Kasumi Ishikawa	3–0	Batsaikhany Batkhishig	11–4, 11–4, 11–7
Miu Hirano	3–0	Barkhasyn Enkhjin	11–3, 11–1, 11–2

27 September	South Korea	3–0	Pakistan

Lee Eun-hee	3–0	Shabnam Bilal	11–4, 11–3, 11–6
Jeon Ji-hee	3–0	Rahila Kashif	11–1, 11–5, 11–4
Park Young-sook	3–0	Aisha Iqbal Ansari	11–5, 11–5, 11–4

27 September	Mongolia	3–0	Maldives

Barkhasyn Enkhjin	3–2	Mueena Mohamed	6–11, 11–13, 14–12, 11–8, 11–9
Batsaikhany Batkhishig	3–0	Aminath Shiura Shareef	11–7, 11–3, 11–4
Bat-Ölziin Sodbolor	3–1	Fathimath Jumana Nimal	11–8, 7–11, 12–10, 11–8

28 September	South Korea	3–0	Mongolia

Suh Hyo-won	3–0	Barkhasyn Enkhjin	11–3, 11–3, 11–2
Yang Ha-eun	3–0	Batsaikhany Batkhishig	11–3, 11–4, 11–3
Jeon Ji-hee	3–0	Bat-Ölziin Sodbolor	11–2, 11–7, 11–1

28 September	Pakistan	0–3	Japan

Shabnam Bilal	0–3	Miu Hirano	5–11, 4–11, 6–11
Rahila Kashif	0–3	Misako Wakamiya	3–11, 5–11, 8–11
Aisha Iqbal Ansari	0–3	Sayaka Hirano	3–11, 1–11, 3–11

28 September	South Korea	2–3	Japan

Yang Ha-eun	1–3	Ai Fukuhara	13–11, 8–11, 5–11, 7–11
Suh Hyo-won	3–0	Kasumi Ishikawa	11–9, 11–6, 11–7
Jeon Ji-hee	3–2	Sayaka Hirano	12–14, 11–8, 11–7, 13–15, 12–10
Suh Hyo-won	1–3	Ai Fukuhara	10–12, 5–11, 11–9, 6–11
Yang Ha-eun	2–3	Kasumi Ishikawa	8–11, 12–10, 13–11, 7–11, 7–11

28 September	Pakistan	3–0	Maldives

Rahila Kashif	3–0	Fathimath Jumana Nimal	11–7, 12–10, 11–6
Shabnam Bilal	3–0	Mueena Mohamed	11–5, 11–7, 11–6
Aisha Iqbal Ansari	3–0	Aminath Shiura Shareef	11–6, 11–2, 11–7

==== Group D ====
Pos	Team	Pld	W	L	MF	MA	Pts	Qualification
1	North Korea	4	4	0	12	2	8	Quarterfinals
2	Hong Kong	4	3	1	11	3	7	Quarterfinals
3	Macau	4	2	2	6	8	6	
4	Laos	4	1	3	5	9	5	
5	Kuwait	4	0	4	0	12	4	

Source: OCA

27 September	Hong Kong	3–0	Kuwait

Ng Wing Nam	3–0	Menwah Al-Shammari	11–3, 11–3, 11–4
Lee Ho Ching	3–0	Maryam Sulaiman	11–8, 11–5, 11–6
Doo Hoi Kem	3–0	Fajir Mohammad	11–4, 11–2, 11–3

27 September	Macau	3–2	Laos

Ma Chao In	1–3	Sengdavieng Douangpanya	7–11, 11–2, 6–11, 3–11
Cheong Cheng I	3–1	Thiphakone Southamavong	13–11, 11–5, 8–11, 11–5
U Sio Mei	3–0	Sisangvan Phimmayoun	11–4, 11–4, 11–3
Cheong Cheng I	2–3	Sengdavieng Douangpanya	11–9, 1–11, 7–11, 11–6, 7–11
Ma Chao In	3–2	Thiphakone Southamavong	11–6, 11–9, 8–11, 11–13, 11–4

27 September	North Korea	3–0	Kuwait

Ri Myong-sun	3–0	Menwah Al-Shammari	11–1, 11–2, 11–5
Kim Jong	3–0	Maryam Sulaiman	11–3, 11–1, 11–3
Ri Mi-gyong	3–0	Fajir Mohammad	11–1, 11–1, 11–2

27 September	Hong Kong	3–0	Macau

Jiang Huajun	3–0	Ma Chao In	11–1, 11–3, 11–7
Doo Hoi Kem	3–0	Cheong Cheng I	11–5, 11–3, 11–6
Tie Ya Na	3–1	U Sio Mei	11–6, 8–11, 11–2, 11–4

27 September	North Korea	3–0	Laos

Ri Mi-gyong	3–1	Thiphakone Southamavong	11–2, 14–16, 11–1, 11–4
Kim Hye-song	3–0	Sengdavieng Douangpanya	11–4, 11–4, 11–3
Kim Song-i	3–0	Sisangvan Phimmayoun	11–2, 11–1, 11–1

27 September	Macau	3–0	Kuwait

Ma Chao In	3–0	Menwah Al-Shammari	11–6, 11–6, 11–7
Cheong Cheng I	3–0	Maryam Sulaiman	11–9, 11–8, 11–3
U Sio Mei	3–0	Noor Salem	11–4, 11–9, 11–4

28 September	North Korea	3–0	Macau

Ri Myong-sun	3–0	Tam Sut Fei	11–6, 11–3, 11–2
Kim Jong	3–0	Ma Chao In	11–3, 11–1, 11–3
Ri Mi-gyong	3–0	Cheong Cheng I	11–4, 11–4, 11–2

28 September	Laos	0–3	Hong Kong

Sengdavieng Douangpanya	0–3	Lee Ho Ching	3–11, 3–11, 10–12
Thiphakone Southamavong	0–3	Jiang Huajun	1–11, 3–11, 4–11
Sisangvan Phimmayoun	0–3	Doo Hoi Kem	3–11, 6–11, 2–11

28 September	North Korea	3–2	Hong Kong

Kim Jong	2–3	Lee Ho Ching	11–4, 4–11, 12–10, 4–11, 10–12
Ri Myong-sun	3–0	Ng Wing Nam	11–7, 11–5, 11–5
Ri Mi-gyong	2–3	Doo Hoi Kem	7–11, 11–9, 12–14, 11–7, 8–11
Ri Myong-sun	3–0	Lee Ho Ching	11–4, 11–7, 11–5
Kim Jong	3–2	Ng Wing Nam	11–8, 7–11, 11–4, 10–12, 11–8

28 September	Laos	3–0	Kuwait

Sengdavieng Douangpanya	3–2	Maryam Sulaiman	11–2, 10–12, 7–11, 11–4, 11–3
Thiphakone Southamavong	3–1	Menwah Al-Shammari	12–10, 11–4, 12–14, 11–6
Sisangvan Phimmayoun	3–0	Noor Salem	11–9, 11–7, 11–7

=== Knockout round ===
Quarterfinals
A1	China	3
Chinese Taipei	0
South Korea	1
D1	North Korea	3
C1	Japan	3
Hong Kong	1
India	0
B1	Singapore	3

Semifinals
A1	China	3
D1	North Korea	0
C1	Japan	3
B1	Singapore	2

Final
A1	China	3
C1	Japan	1

==== Quarterfinals ====
28 September	China	3–0	Chinese Taipei

Ding Ning	3–0	Chen Szu-yu	11–6, 11–8, 11–2
Zhu Yuling	3–2	Cheng I-ching	11–7, 11–7, 9–11, 8–11, 11–9
Chen Meng	3–0	Lee I-chen	11–5, 11–4, 11–9

28 September	South Korea	1–3	North Korea

Yang Ha-eun	2–3	Kim Jong	11–9, 2–11, 7–11, 11–8, 3–11
Suh Hyo-won	2–3	Ri Myong-sun	8–11, 11–13, 11–6, 11–7, 7–11
Lee Eun-hee	3–1	Ri Mi-gyong	8–11, 11–7, 11–5, 11–3
Yang Ha-eun	1–3	Ri Myong-sun	9–11, 9–11, 11–3, 4–11

28 September	Japan	3–1	Hong Kong

Kasumi Ishikawa	3–0	Lee Ho Ching	11–6, 11–8, 11–7
Ai Fukuhara	3–1	Doo Hoi Kem	13–11, 11–3, 10–12, 11–7
Sayaka Hirano	0–3	Ng Wing Nam	6–11, 9–11, 8–11
Ai Fukuhara	3–0	Lee Ho Ching	11–7, 11–5, 11–6

28 September	India	0–3	Singapore

Manika Batra	0–3	Feng Tianwei	7–11, 8–11, 7–11
Ankita Das	1–3	Lin Ye	9–11, 8–11, 11–6, 8–11
Poulomi Ghatak	0–3	Zhou Yihan	5–11, 11–13, 9–11

==== Semifinals ====
29 September	China	3–0	North Korea

Ding Ning	3–0	Kim Jong	11–9, 11–7, 11–5
Liu Shiwen	3–0	Ri Myong-sun	11–7, 11–3, 11–8
Zhu Yuling	3–0	Ri Mi-gyong	11–3, 11–6, 11–6

29 September	Japan	3–2	Singapore

Ai Fukuhara	3–0	Lin Ye	11–8, 11–7, 11–7
Kasumi Ishikawa	3–2	Feng Tianwei	11–8, 13–11, 7–11, 9–11, 11–5
Sayaka Hirano	2–3	Zhou Yihan	13–11, 8–11, 11–3, 8–11, 3–11
Ai Fukuhara	1–3	Feng Tianwei	6–11, 2–11, 11–7, 8–11
Kasumi Ishikawa	3–1	Lin Ye	11–2, 11–7, 7–11, 11–4

==== Final ====
30 September	China	3–1	Japan

Ding Ning	1–3	Ai Fukuhara	6–11, 9–11, 11–3, 13–15
Liu Shiwen	3–1	Kasumi Ishikawa	3–11, 11–6, 11–7, 11–8
Zhu Yuling	3–0	Miu Hirano	11–8, 11–4, 11–3
Ding Ning	3–0	Kasumi Ishikawa	11–6, 11–7, 11–5

== Non-participating athletes ==
- Noora Al-Abri (QAT)
- Yu Mengyu (SIN)
