= Table tennis at the 2014 Commonwealth Games – Women's team =

Table Tennis – Women's team at the 2014 Commonwealth Games
- Venue: Scotstoun Sports Campus, Glasgow
- Dates: 24–27 July 2014
- Competitors: 91 from 22 nations

Medalists
gold medal	Feng Tianwei; Isabelle Li; Lin Ye; Yu Mengyu; Zhou Yihan	Singapore
silver medal	Lee Wei Beh; Ng Sock Khim; Ho Ying; Lee Rou You	Malaysia
bronze medal	Zhenhua Dederko; Jian Fang Lay; Miao Miao; Melissa Tapper; Ziyu Zhang	Australia

The Women's team table tennis event at the 2014 Commonwealth Games was held from 24 July to 27 July at the Scotstoun Sports Campus in Glasgow.

== Group stage ==
=== Pool A ===
Team	MP	MW	ML	GP	GW	GL	PW	PL	PT
Singapore	2	2	0	6	6	0	18	0	4
Sri Lanka	2	1	1	7	3	4	6	18	3
Northern Ireland	2	0	2	7	1	6	11	15	2

Qualified for the quarterfinals
Qualified for the first round
Qualified for the classification quarterfinals

24 July 2014; 09:30	Singapore	3–0	Sri Lanka	Scotstoun Sports Campus, Glasgow

report	Individual matches
Yu Mengyu	3–0	Erandi Warusawithana	11–6, 11–8, 11–4
Isabelle Li	3–0	Ishara Madurangi	11–9, 11–2, 11–7
Lin Ye/Yu Mengyu	3–0	Hansani Piumila/Ishara Madurangi	13–11, 12–10, 11–7

24 July 2014; 16:00	Singapore	3–0	Northern Ireland	Scotstoun Sports Campus, Glasgow

report	Individual matches
Yu Mengyu	3–0	Amanda Mogey	11-4, 11-8, 11-4
Isabelle Li	3–0	Ashley Givan	11-1, 11-9, 11-9
Zhou Yihan/Isabelle Li	3–0	Emma Ludlow/Amanda Mogey	11-5, 11-4, 11-4

25 July 2014; 09:30	Northern Ireland	1–3	Sri Lanka	Scotstoun Sports Campus, Glasgow

report	Individual matches
Amanda Mogey	2–3	Hansani Piumila	8-11, 10-12, 12-10, 11-8, 11-13
Ashley Givan	1–3	Ishara Madurangi	11-6, 9-11, 8-11, 9-11
Hannah Lynch-Dawson/Amanda Mogey	3–2	Erandi Warusawithana/Hansani Piumila	11-9, 5-11, 11-9, 3-11, 11-7
Ashley Givan	0–3	Erandi Warusawithana	6-11, 6-11, 11-13

=== Pool B ===
Team	MP	MW	ML	GP	GW	GL	PW	PL	PT
Australia	2	2	0	6	6	0	18	3	4
Guyana	2	1	1	8	3	5	12	19	3
Scotland	2	0	2	8	2	6	13	21	2

Qualified for the quarterfinals
Qualified for the first rounds
Qualified for the classification quarterfinals

24 July 2014; 09:30	Australia	3–0	Guyana	Scotstoun Sports Campus, Glasgow

report	Individual matches
Melissa Tapper	3–0	Trenace Lowe	11-5, 17-15, 11-7
Zhenhua Dederko	3–0	Natalie Cummings	11-3, 11-3, 11-7
Miao Miao/Zhenhua Dederko	3–0	Chelsea Edghill/Natalie Cummings	11-1, 11-9, 11-5

24 July 2014; 16:00	Australia	3–0	Scotland	Scotstoun Sports Campus, Glasgow

report	Individual matches
Jian Fang Lay	3–1	Corinna Whitaker	11-1, 11-4, 5-11, 11-4
Ziyu Zhang	3–0	Gillian Edwards	11-4, 11-7, 11-6
Zhenhua Dederko/Ziyu Zhang	3–2	Lynda Flaws/Corinna Whitaker	11-4, 11-7, 6-11, 9-11, 11-3

25 July 2014; 09:30	Guyana	3–2	Scotland	Scotstoun Sports Campus, Glasgow

report	Individual matches
Trenace Lowe	3–0	Corinna Whitaker	11-1, 11-8, 11-7
Natalie Cummings	3–2	Gillian Edwards	7-11, 13-11, 7-11, 11-7, 11-7
Chelsea Edghill/Trenace Lowe	1–3	Lynda Flaws/Corinna Whitaker	11-9, 7-11, 8-11, 8-11
Natalie Cummings	2–3	Lynda Flaws	5-11, 11-9, 11-1, 10-12, 8-11
Chelsea Edghill	3–2	Gillian Edwards	12-10, 5-11, 7-11, 11-7, 11-7

=== Pool C ===
Team	MP	MW	ML	GP	GW	GL	PW	PL	PT
England	3	3	0	9	9	0	27	0	6
Trinidad and Tobago	3	2	1	11	6	5	20	17	5
Ghana	3	1	2	13	3	10	21	27	4
Tanzania	3	0	3	11	2	9	7	31	3

Qualified for the quarterfinals
Qualified for the first rounds
Qualified for the classification quarterfinals
Qualified for the classification first rounds

24 July 2014; 09:30	England	3–0	Ghana	Scotstoun Sports Campus, Glasgow

report	Individual matches
Joanna Drinkhall	3–0	Ceila Baah-Danso	11-9, 11-4, 11-7
Kelly Sibley	3–0	Cynthia Kwabi	11-9, 11-4, 11-7
Tin-Tin Ho/Kelly Sibley	3–0	Mareen Adom Amankwaa/Ceila Baah-Danso	11-9, 11-7, 11-7

24 July 2014; 09:30	Trinidad and Tobago	3–0	Tanzania	Scotstoun Sports Campus, Glasgow

report	Individual matches
Rheann Chung	3–0	Neema Dennis Mwaisyula	11-4, 11-3, 11-6
Aleena Edwards	3–0	Agnes Wiron Ngodoki	11-5, 11-5, 11-7
Catherine Spicer/Aleena Edwards	3–0	Mwamvita Abdu Mohamed/Neema Dennis Mwaisyula	11-3, 11-9, 11-5

24 July 2014; 16:00	England	3–0	Trinidad and Tobago	Scotstoun Sports Campus, Glasgow

report	Individual matches
Joanna Drinkhall	3–0	Rheann Chung	11-7, 12-10, 11-6
Kelly Sibley	3–0	Catherine Spicer	11-9, 11-8, 11-1
Tin-Tin Ho/Kelly Sibley	3–0	Ashley Quashie/Rheann Chung	11-6, 11-2, 11-3

24 July 2014; 16:00	Ghana	3–2	Tanzania	Scotstoun Sports Campus, Glasgow

report	Individual matches
Celia Baah-Danso	2–3	Neema Dennis Mwaisyula	5-11, 11-8, 11-13, 11-1, 9-11
Cynthia Kwabi	3–0	Agnes Wiron Ngodoki	11-7, 11-4, 11-9
Bernice Borquaye/Celia Baah-Danso	2–3	Mwamvita Abdu Mohamed/Agnes Wiron Ngodoki	11-8, 9-11, 9-11, 13-11, 8-11
Bernice Borquaye	3–1	Neema Dennis Mwaisyula	11-3, 11-7 ,10-12, 11-5
Cynthia Kwabi	3–0	Mwamvita Abdu Mohamed	11-4, 11-7, 11-5

25 July 2014; 09:30	England	3–0	Tanzania	Scotstoun Sports Campus, Glasgow

report	Individual matches
Joanna Drinkhall	3–0	Agnes Wiron Ngodoki	11-2, 7-11, 3-11
Kelly Sibley	3–0	Neema Dennis Mwaisyula	11-2, 11-5, 12-10
Hannah Hicks/Kelly Sibley	3–0	Mwamvita Abdu Mohamed/Neema Dennis Mohamed	11-3, 11-3, 11-2

25 July 2014; 09:30	Trinidad and Tobago	3–2	Ghana	Scotstoun Sports Campus, Glasgow

report	Individual matches
Aleena Edwards	2–3	Cynthia Kwabi	2-11, 11-9, 4-11, 13-11, 9-11
Rheann Chung	3–0	Celia Baah-Danso	11-7, 11-4, 11-7
Catherine Spicer/Aleena Edwards	3–2	Bernice Borquave/Celia Baah-Danso	11-9, 11-8, 11-13, 9-11, 12-10
Catherine Spicer	0–3	Cynthia Kwabi	6-11, 6-11, 6-11
Rheann Chung	3–0	Bernice Borquave	11-5, 11-4, 11-4

=== Pool D ===
Team	MP	MW	ML	GP	GW	GL	PW	PL	PT
India	3	3	0	10	9	1	28	5	6
Nigeria	3	2	1	10	7	3	22	10	5
Barbados	3	1	2	11	3	8	12	25	4
Kenya	3	0	3	11	2	9	7	29	3

Qualified for the quarterfinals
Qualified for the first rounds
Qualified for the classification quarterfinals
Qualified for the classification first rounds

24 July 2014; 09:30	India	3–0	Barbados	Scotstoun Sports Campus, Glasgow

report	Individual matches
Shamini Kumaresan	3–0	Sherrice Felix	11-3, 11-2, 11-3
Manika Batra	3–0	Anthonette Riley	11-2, 11-5, 11-2
Madhurika Suhas Patkar/Shamini Kumaresan	3–1	Krystle Harvey/Anthonette Riley	11-4, 11-4, 9-11, 11-3

24 July 2014; 09:30	Nigeria	3–0	Kenya	Scotstoun Sports Campus, Glasgow

report	Individual matches
Offiong Edem	3–0	Jinita Azad Kumar Shah	11-3, 11-1, 11-8
Ganiat Ogundele	3–0	Sejal Dipan Thakkar	11-4, 11-3, 11-6
Ganiat Ogundele/Rashidat Ogundele	3–0	Della Mgenya Njani	11-6, 11-3, 11-4

24 July 2014; 16:00	India	3–1	Nigeria	Scotstoun Sports Campus, Glasgow

report	Individual matches
Shamini Kumaresan	3–1	Offiong Edem	8-11, 11-9, 11-6, 11-5
Manika Batra	1–3	Olufunke Oshonaike	9-11, 9-11, 12-10, 6-11
Madhurika Suhas Patkar/Shamini Kumaresan	3–0	Cecilia Akpan/Offiong Edem	11-9, 11-7, 11-6
Manika Batra	3–0	Cecilia Akpan	11-5, 11-3, 12-10

24 July 2014; 16:00	Barbados	3–2	Kenya	Scotstoun Sports Campus, Glasgow

report	Individual matches
Krystal Harvey	3–0	Jinita Azad Kumar Shah	14-12, 11-9, 11-7
Anthonette Riley	2–3	Sejal Dipan Thakkar	11-2, 5-11, 8-11, 11-3 10-12
Sherice Felix/Anthonette Riley	3–1	Della Mgenya Njani/Sejal Dipan Thakkar	11-8, 7-11, 11-7, 11-9
Sherice Felix	0–3	Jinita Azad Kumar Shah	9-11, 6-11, 3-11
Krystal Harvey	3–0	Della Mgenya Njani	11-4, 11-8, 11-5

25 July 2014; 09:30	India	3–0	Kenya	Scotstoun Sports Campus, Glasgow

report	Individual matches
Poulomi Ghatak	3–0	Jinita Azad Kumar Shah	11-4, 11-3, 11-5
Manika Batra	3–0	Sejal Dipan Thakkar	11-7, 11-4, 11-4
Ankita Das/Poulomi Ghatak	3–0	Della Mgenya Njani/Sejal Dipan Thakkar	11-6, 11-5, 11-5

25 July 2014; 09:30	Nigeria	3–0	Barbados	Scotstoun Sports Campus, Glasgow

report	Individual matches
Rashidat Ogundele	3–0	Sherice Felix	11-9, 11-6, 11-7
Ganiat Ogundele	3–0	Krystal Harvey	11-5, 11-5, 11-7
Olufunke Oshonaike/Ganiat Ogundele	3–0	Anthonette Riley/Sherice Felix	11-6, 11-7, 11-7

=== Pool E ===
Team	MP	MW	ML	GP	GW	GL	PW	PL	PT
New Zealand	3	3	0	11	9	2	29	9	6
Wales	3	2	1	11	8	3	25	12	5
Mauritius	3	1	2	9	3	6	12	21	4
Vanuatu	3	0	3	9	0	9	3	27	3

Qualified for the first rounds
Qualified for the classification quarterfinals
Qualified for the classification first rounds

24 July 2014; 09:30	New Zealand	3–0	Vanuatu	Scotstoun Sports Campus, Glasgow

report	Individual matches
Chunli Li	3–0	Pareina Matariki	11-7, 11-6, 11-6
Karen Li	3–0	Anolyn Lulu	11-7, 11-3, 11-7
Jenny Hung/Chunli Li	3–0	Rosanna Abel/Anolyn Lulu	11-4, 11-6, 11-7

24 July 2014; 09:30	Wales	3–0	Mauritius	Scotstoun Sports Campus, Glasgow

report	Individual matches
Naomi Owen	3–0	Deborah Wong Yuen Kwong	11-7, 11-5, 11-2
Charlotte Carey	3–1	Isabelle Chowree	11-6, 10-12, 11-9, 11-6
Chloe Thomas/Charlotte Carey	3–0	Widaad Gukhool/Deborah Wong Yuen Kwong	11-6, 11-8, 13-11

24 July 2014; 16:00	New Zealand	3–2	Wales	Scotstoun Sports Campus, Glasgow

report	Individual matches
Chunli Li	3–1	Charlotte Carey	11-9, 11-2, 6-11, 11-8
Karen Li	3–0	Naomi Owen	12-10, 12-10, 11-6
Annie Yang/Karen Li	2–3	Chloe Thomas/Charlotte Carey	12-10, 6-11, 8-11, 11-9, 9-11
Annie Yang	0–3	Naomi Owen	4-11, 6-11, 7-11
Chunli Li	3–0	Chloe Thomas	11-6, 11-5, 11-6

24 July 2014; 16:00	Vanuatu	0–3	Mauritius	Scotstoun Sports Campus, Glasgow

report	Individual matches
Rosanna Abel	0–3	Isabelle Chowree	7-11, 4-11, 14-16
Anolyn Lulu	2–3	Widaad Gukhool	11-6, 7-11, 11-4, 9-11, 8-11
Pareina Matariki/Anolyn Lulu	1–3	Deborah Wong Yuen Kwong/Isabelle Chowree	8-11, 9-11, 11-8, 9-11

25 July 2014; 09:30	New Zealand	3–0	Mauritius	Scotstoun Sports Campus, Glasgow

report	Individual matches
Chunli Li	3–0	Widaad Gukhool	11-2, 11-7, 11-3
Karen Li	3–0	Isabelle Chowree	11-3, 11-1, 11-7
Yang Sun/Karen Li	3–2	Deborah Wong Yuen Kwong/Widaad Gukhool	11-7, 9-11, 10-12, 11-8, 11-8

25 July 2014; 09:30	Wales	3–0	Vanuatu	Scotstoun Sports Campus, Glasgow

report	Individual matches
Naomi Owen	3–0	Anolyn Lulu	11-7, 11-4, 11-3
'Megan Phillips	3–0	Roanna Abel	11-4, 11-5, 11-5
Angharad Phillips/Megan Phillips	3–0	Pareina Matariki/Anolyn Lulu	11-4, 11-4, 11-2

=== Pool F ===
Team	MP	MW	ML	GP	GW	GL	PW	PL	PT
Malaysia	3	3	0	11	9	2	29	8	6
Canada	3	2	1	11	8	3	25	16	5
Jamaica	3	1	2	9	3	6	10	18	4
Papua New Guinea	3	0	3	9	0	9	0	27	3

Qualified for the first rounds
Qualified for the classification quarterfinals
Qualified for the classification first rounds

24 July 2014; 09:30	Canada	3–0	Jamaica	Scotstoun Sports Campus, Glasgow

report	Individual matches
Zhang Mo	3–0	Yvonne Foster	11-1, 11-5, 11-6
Luo Anqi	3–0	Shenique Clare	11-3, 12-10, 14-12
Betty Guo/Luo Anqi	3–0	Dadrian Lewis/Shenique Clare	11-1, 11-8, 11-7

24 July 2014; 09:30	Malaysia	3–0	Papua New Guinea	Scotstoun Sports Campus, Glasgow

report	Individual matches
Lee Wei Beh	3–0	Samantha Loi	11-1, 11-3, 11-4
Ying Ho	3–0	Idau Boni Chris	11-1, 11-1, 11-5
Sock Khim Ng/Ying Ho	3–0	Geru Elizabeth Lohia/Samantha Loi	11-1, 11-3, 11-1

24 July 2014; 16:00	Canada	2–3	Malaysia	Scotstoun Sports Campus, Glasgow

report	Individual matches
Zhang Mo	3–2	Lee Wei Beh	8-11, 11-8, 7-11, 19-17, 11-3
Luo Anqi	0–3	Sock Khim Ng	11-13, 7-11, 9-11
Betty Guo/Luo Anqi	0–3	Ying Ho/Lee Wei Beh	7-11, 5-11, 9-11
Zhang Mo	3–2	Ho Ying	9-11, 11-5, 5-11, 11-7, 11-7
Betty Guo	1–3	Ng Sock Khim	9-11, 4-11, 11-7, 7-11

24 July 2014; 16:00	Jamaica	3–0	Papua New Guinea	Scotstoun Sports Campus, Glasgow

report	Individual matches
Yvonne Foster	3–0	Maryanne Robert Loi	11-2, 11-0, 11-2
Shenique Clare	3–0	Geru Elizabeth Lohia	11-3, 11-5, 11-6
Dadrian Lewis/Yvonne Foster	3–0	Samantha Loi/Geru Elizabeth Lohia	11-4, 11-6, 11-8

25 July 2014; 09:30	Canada	3–0	Papua New Guinea	Scotstoun Sports Campus, Glasgow

report	Individual matches
Luo Anqi	3–0	Samantha Loi	11-3, 11-1, 11-4
Betty Guo	3–0	Geru Elizabeth Lohia	11-5, 11-6, 11-1
Zhang Mo/Luo Anqi	3–0	Eileen Tongia/Geru Elizabeth Lohia	11-5, 11-1, 11-3

25 July 2014; 09:30	Malaysia	3–0	Jamaica	Scotstoun Sports Campus, Glasgow

report	Individual matches
Ying Ho	3–0	Shenique Clare	14-12, 11-7, 11-5
Rou You Lee	3–1	Yvonne Foster	6-11, 11-6, 11-6, 11-7
Lee Wei Beh/Rou You Lee	3–0	Dadrian Lewis/Shenique Clare	11-4, 11-5, 11-6

== Classification stage ==
First Round
21	Papua New Guinea	0
20	Kenya	3
22	Tanzania	3
18	Vanuatu	1

Quarterfinals
15	Ghana	3
20	Kenya	0
11	Northern Ireland	3
19	Mauritius	0
16	Jamaica	3
17	Barbados	2
22	Tanzania	0
10	Scotland	3

Semifinals
15	Ghana	0
11	Northern Ireland	3
16	Jamaica	0
10	Scotland	3

Finals
11	Northern Ireland	3
10	Scotland	1

=== First round ===
25 July 2014; 16:00	Papua New Guinea	0–3	Kenya	Scotstoun Sports Campus, Glasgow

report	Individual matches
Maryanne Robert Loi	0–3	Jinita Azad Kumar Shah	5-11, 6-11, 2-11
Idau Boni Chris	0–3	Sejal Dipan Thakkar	1-11, 6-11, 5-11
Geru Elizabeth Lohia/Maryanne Robert Loi	2–3	Della Mgenya Njani/Sejal Dipan Thakkar	11-9, 11-9, 3-11, 7-11, 4-11

25 July 2014; 16:00	Tanzania	3–1	Vanuatu	Scotstoun Sports Campus, Glasgow

report	Individual matches
Agnes Wiron Ngodoki	1–3	Anolyn Lulu	11-4, 8-11, 6-11, 8-11
Neema Dennis Mwaisyula	3–0	Pareina Matariki	11-6, 11-3, 14-12
Mwamvita Abdu Mohamed/Agnes Wiron Ngodoki	3–0	Rosanna Abel/Anolyn Lulu	11-8, 7-11, 11-7, 9-11, 11-8
Mwamvita Abdu Mohamed	3–0	Pareina Matariki	11-7, 11-4, 11-2

=== Quarterfinals ===
26 July 2014; 09:30	Ghana	3–0	Kenya	Scotstoun Sports Campus, Glasgow

report	Individual matches
Bernice Borquaye	3–0	Jinita Azad Kumar Shah	7-11, 11-6, 11-6, 9-11, 11-6
Cynthia Kwabi	3–1	Sejal Dipan Thakkar	10-12, 11-6, 11-3, 11-5
Celia Baah-Danso/Cynthia Kwabi	3–0	Della Mgenya Njani/Sejal Dipan Thakkar	11-4, 11-9, 11-8

26 July 2014; 09:30	Northern Ireland	3–0	Mauritius	Scotstoun Sports Campus, Glasgow

report	Individual matches
Amanda Mogey	3–2	Isabelle Chowree	5-11, 11-9, 11-6, 12-14, 11-6
Ashley Givan	3–0	Widaad Gukhool	11-8, 11-8, 11-9
Emma Ludlow/Ashley Givan	3–2	Deborah Wong Yuen Kwong/Widaad Gukhool	7-11, 11-5, 11-8, 9-11, 11-9

26 July 2014; 09:30	Jamaica	3–2	Barbados	Scotstoun Sports Campus, Glasgow

report	Individual matches
Shenique Clare	0–3	Sherice Felix	4-11, 9-11, 9-11
Yvonne Foster	3–1	Krystal Harvey	11-2, 8-11, 11-9, 11-9
Dadrian Lewis/Yvonne Foster	1–3	Anthonette Riley/Sherice Felix	6-11, 6-11, 11-7, 9-11
Dadrian Lewis	3–1	Krystal Harvey	11-8, 6-11, 11-9, 11-5
Shenique Clare	3–1	Anthonette Riley	10-12, 11-8, 11-3, 11-9

26 July 2014; 09:30	Tanzania	0–3	Scotland	Scotstoun Sports Campus, Glasgow

report	Individual matches
Agnes Wiron Ngodoki	0–3	Lynda Flaws	10-12, 5-11, 3-11
Neema Dennis Mwaisyula	0–3	Gillian Edwards	8-11, 2-11, 5-11
Mwamvita Abdu Mohamed/Neema Dennis Mwaisyula	0–3	Corinna Whitaker/Lynda Flaws	7-11, 7-11, 3-11

=== Semifinals ===
26 July 2014; 16:00	Ghana	0–3	Northern Ireland	Scotstoun Sports Campus, Glasgow

report	Individual matches
Cynthia Kwabi	2–3	Amanda Mogey	7-11, 11-6, 9-11, 11-7, 8-11
Celia Baah-Danso	1–3	Ashley Givan	11-8, 11-13, 6-11, 4-11
Bernice Borquaye/Celia Baah-Danso	0–3	Hannah Lynch-Dawson/Amanda Mogey	10-12, 7-11, 2-11

26 July 2014; 16:00	Jamaica	0–3	Scotland	Scotstoun Sports Campus, Glasgow

report	Individual matches
Yvonne Foster	0–3	Lynda Flaws	5-11, 9-11, 5-11
Shenique Clare	2–3	Gillian Edwards	12-10, 9-11, 6-11, 11-9, 6-11
Dadrian Lewis/Shenique Clare	0–3	Corinna Whitaker/Lynda Flaws	7-11, 7-11, 7-11

=== Final ===
27 July 2014; 09:30	Northern Ireland	3–1	Scotland	Scotstoun Sports Campus, Glasgow

report	Individual matches
Hannah Lynch-Dawson	3–0	Lynda Flaws	11-5, 11-7, 11-4
Ashley Givan	3–1	Gillian Edwards	9-11, 11-7, 11-5, 11-9
Emma Ludlow/Ashley Givan	0–3	Corinna Whitaker/Lynda Flaws	9-11, 9-11, 4-11
Hannah Lynch-Dawson	3–1	Corinna Whitaker	12-10, 9-11, 11-9, 11-6

== Knockout stage ==
First Round
Canada	3
Guyana	1
New Zealand	3
Trinidad and Tobago	0
Nigeria	0
Malaysia	3
Sri Lanka	0
Wales	3

Quarterfinals
Singapore	3
Canada	0
India	3
New Zealand	0
England	2
Malaysia	3
Australia	3
Wales	0

Semifinals
Singapore	3
India	1
Malaysia	3
Australia	1

Final
Singapore	3
Malaysia	0
Third Place
India	1
Australia	3

=== First round ===
25 July 2014; 16:00	Canada	3–1	Guyana	Scotstoun Sports Campus, Glasgow

report	Individual matches
Zhang Mo	3–0	Trenace Lowe	11-3, 11-2, 11-2
Luo Anqi	3–0	Chelsea Edghill	11-3, 11-7, 11-6
Betty Guo/Luo Anqi	2–3	Natalie Cummings/Chelsea Edghill	9-11, 11-7, 6-11, 11-3, 10-12
Betty Guo	3–0	Trenace Lowe	11-5, 11-5, 11-8

25 July 2014; 16:00	New Zealand	3–0	Trinidad and Tobago	Scotstoun Sports Campus, Glasgow

report	Individual matches
Chunli Li	3–0	Catherine Spicer	11-3, 11-6, 11-5
Karen Li	3–2	Rheann Chung	8-11, 11-2, 9-11, 11-5, 11-6
Sun Yang/Karen Li	3–0	Ashley Quashie/Rheann Chung	11-9, 11-3, 11-5

25 July 2014; 16:00	Nigeria	0–3	Malaysia	Scotstoun Sports Campus, Glasgow

report	Individual matches
Olufunke Oshonaike	1–3	Lee Wei Beh	6-11, 7-11, 11-9, 8-11
Offiong Edem	1–3	Sock Khim Ng	5-11, 12-10, 5-11, 9-11
Ganiat Ogundele/Offiong Edem	1–3	Ying Ho/Sock Khim Ng	2-11, 6-11, 11-4, 3-11

25 July 2014; 16:00	Sri Lanka	0–3	Wales	Scotstoun Sports Campus, Glasgow

report	Individual matches
Hansani Piumila	0–3	Naomi Owen	4-11, 3-11, 2-11
Ishara Madurangi	0–3	Charlotte Carey	7-11, 7-11, 9-11
Erandi Warusawithana/Hansana Piumila	0–3	Megan Phillips/Naomi Owen	7-11, 7-11, 5-11

=== Quarterfinals ===
26 July 2014; 09:30	Singapore	3–0	Canada	Scotstoun Sports Campus, Glasgow

report	Individual matches
Feng Tianwei	3–0	Zhang Mo	12-10, 11-5, 11-7
Yu Mengyu	3–0	Luo Anqi	11-2, 11-5, 11-1
Lin Ye/Yu Mengyu	3–0	Betty Guo/Luo Anqi	11-8, 11-5, 11-3

26 July 2014; 09:30	New Zealand	0–3	India	Scotstoun Sports Campus, Glasgow

report	Individual matches
Chunli Li	1–3	Shamini Kumaresan	11-5, 9-11, 5-11, 5-11
Karen Li	1–3	Manika Batra	13-11, 9-11, 5-11, 6-11
Sun Yang/Karen Li	0–3	Madhrika Suhas Patkar/Shamini Kumaresan	8-11, 8-11, 8-11

26 July 2014; 09:30	England	2–3	Malaysia	Scotstoun Sports Campus, Glasgow

report	Individual matches
Joanna Drinkhall	3–1	Lee Wei Beh	11-9, 11-9, 5-11, 11-9
Kelly Sibley	0–3	Sock Khim Ng	7-11, 15-17, 7-11
Tin-Tin Ho/Kelly Sibley	2–3	Ying Ho/Lee Wei Beh	7-11, 11-6, 5-11, 11-7, 6-11
Joanna Drinkhall	3–0	Ying Ho	11-8, 11-8, 11-3
Tin-Tin Ho	2–3	Sock Khim Ng	13-11, 11-9, 5-11, 9-11, 9-11

26 July 2014; 09:30	Wales	0–3	Australia	Scotstoun Sports Campus, Glasgow

report	Individual matches
Charlotte Carey	0–3	Jian Fang Lay	8-11, 9-11, 6-11
Naomi Owen	2–3	Miao Miao	11-5, 11-8, 8-11, 5-11, 10-12
Chloe Thomas/Charlotte Carey	0–3	Ziyu Zhang/Miao Miao	9-11, 11-13, 9-11

=== Semifinals ===
26 July 2014; 16:00	Singapore	3–1	India	Scotstoun Sports Campus, Glasgow

report	Individual matches
Feng Tianwei	3–0	Shamini Kumaresan	11-1, 13-11, 11-5
Yu Mengyu	2–3	Manika Batra	7-11, 11-5, 8-11, 11-5, 11-7
Lin Ye/Yu Mengyu	3–0	Madhurika Suhas Patkar/Shamini Kumaresan	11-9, 11-7, 11-5
Lin Ye	3–1	Manika Batra	11-9, 9-11, 11-6, 11-5

26 July 2014; 16:00	Malaysia	3–1	Australia	Scotstoun Sports Campus, Glasgow

report	Individual matches
Lee Wei Beh	3–0	Jian Fang Lay	12-10, 14-12, 11-8
Sock Khim Ng	0–3	Ziyu Zhang	6-11, 6-11, 5-11
Ying Ho/Lee Wei Beh	3–2	Zhenhua Dederko/Ziyu Zhang	11-7, 8-11, 11-9, 5-11, 11-7
Sock Khim Ng	3–1	Zhenhua Dederko	2-11, 11-7, 11-8, 11-6

=== Bronze medal ===
27 July 2014; 09:30	India	1–3	Australia	Scotstoun Sports Campus, Glasgow

report	Individual matches
Shamini Kumaresan	1–3	Ziyu Zhang	5-11, 11-2, 6-11, 9-11
Manika Batra	3–1	Jian Fang Lay	11-5, 8-11, 11-8, 11-7
Madhurika Suhas Patkar/Shamini Kumaresan	2–3	Miao Miao/Jian Fang Lay	21-19, 3-11, 11-9, 4-11, 7-11
Madhurika Suhas Patkar	2–3	Ziyu Zhang	9-11, 11-5, 11-8, 8-11, 9-11

=== Final ===
27 July 2014; 12:00	Singapore	3–0	Malaysia	Scotstoun Sports Campus, Glasgow

report	Individual matches
Yu Mengyu	3–1	Sock Khim Ng	7–11, 11–5, 11–9, 11–9
Feng Tianwei	3–0	Lee Wei Beh	11–8, 11–5, 11–4
Lin Ye/Yu Mengyu	3–1	Ying Ho/Lee Wei Beh	11–9, 11–13, 11–9, 11–5
