= Table tennis at the 2013 SEA Games – Women's team =

The women's team table tennis event was part of the table tennis programme and took place between 17 and 19 December, at the Wunna Theikdi Indoor Stadium, Naypyidaw, Myanmar.

== Schedule ==
All times are Myanmar Standard Time (UTC+06:30)

Date	Time	Event
Tuesday, 17 December 2013	10:45	Preliminary round 1
Wednesday, 18 December 2013	09:00	Preliminary round 2
Wednesday, 18 December 2013	14:00	Preliminary round 3
Thursday, 19 December 2013	09:00	Semifinals
Thursday, 19 December 2013	14:00	Final

== Results ==
=== Preliminary round ===
==== Group X ====
Team	Pld	W	L	MF	MA	GF	GA	F-A	Pts
Singapore	2	2	0	6	1	19	4	247-176	4
Malaysia	2	1	1	4	3	12	10	199-187	3
Indonesia	2	0	2	0	6	1	18	128-211	2

17 December 2013	Singapore	3–0	Indonesia

Yu Mengyu	3–1	Novita Oktariyani	11-7, 9-11, 13-11, 11-2
Isabelle Li Siyun	3–0	Stella Priska Palit	11-8, 12-10, 11-9
Zhou Yihan / Isabelle Li Siyun	3–0	Novita Oktariyani / Widya Wulansari	11-2, 11-6, 12-10

18 December 2013	Singapore	3–1	Malaysia

Yu Mengyu	3–0	Rou You Lee	11-8, 11-4, 11-5
Isabelle Li Siyun	3–0	Ying Ho	11-9, 11-8, 11-8
Zhou Yihan / Yu Mengyu	1–3	Lee Wei Beh / Rou You Lee	9-11, 11-8, 7-11, 9-11
Zhou Yihan	3–0	Ying Ho	11-9, 11-2, 11-6

18 December 2013	Malaysia	3–0	Indonesia

Lee Wei Beh	3–0	Novita Oktariyani	11-2, 11-8, 11-2
Rou You Lee	3–0	Stella Priska Palit	11-9, 11-9, 11-9
Ying Ho / Rou You vs Lee	3–0	Novita Oktariyani / Widya Wulansari	11-4, 11-3, 11-6

==== Group Y ====
Team	Pld	W	L	MF	MA	GF	GA	F-A	Pts
Thailand	3	3	0	9	0	27	4	342-207	6
Vietnam	3	2	1	6	3	20	10	289-221	5
Myanmar	3	1	2	3	7	10	23	212-320	4
Laos	3	0	3	1	9	8	28	270-365	3

17 December 2013	Thailand	3–0	Myanmar

Khetkhuan Tamolwan	3–0	Swe Swe Han	11-3, 11-1, 11-6
Komwong Nanthana	3–0	Aye Myat Thu	11-5, 11-6, 11-3
Muangsuk Anisara / Khetkhuan Tamolwan	3–0	Aye Myat Thu / Aye Thida Pyone	11-4, 11-6, 11-2

17 December 2013	Vietnam	3–0	Laos

Hoang My Trang Mai	3–1	Douangpanya Seangdavieng	11-7, 5-11, 11-3, 11-8
The Viet Linh Nguyen	3–0	Southammavong Thiphakone	11-5, 11-8, 11-4
Hoang Tuong Giang Phan / Hoang My Trang Mai	3–0	Southammavong Thiphakone / Manychanh Dalavone	11-6, 11-3, 11-8

18 December 2013	Myanmar	3–1	Laos

Swe Swe Han	3–1	Douangpanya Seangdavieng	4-11, 5-11, 11-9, 10-12
Aye Myat Thu	1–3	Southammavong Thiphakone	11-7, 11-9, 11-6
Aye Myat Thu / Myint Myint Hlaing	3–0	Douangpanya Seangdavieng / Manychanh Dalavone	6-11, 11-4, 11-5, 11-8
Swe Swe Han	3–1	Manychanh Dalavone	11-7, 6-11, 11-4, 11-7

18 December 2013	Thailand	3–0	Vietnam

Muangsuk Anisara	3–2	The Viet Linh Nguyen	13-15, 7-11, 15-13, 11-7, 11-6
Komwong Nanthana	3–0	Hoang My Trang Mai	11-7, 11-7, 11-5
Muangsuk Anisara / Khetkhuan Tamolwan	3–0	Hoang My Trang Mai / Thi Nga Nguyen	11-7, 11-4, 11-4

18 December 2013	Vietnam	3–0	Myanmar

The Viet Linh Nguyen	3–0	Swe Swe Han	11-3, 11-2, 11-2
Hoang My Trang Mai	3–0	Aye Myat Thu	11-5, 11-5, 11-4
Hoang My Trang Mai / Thi Nga Nguyen	3–0	Sandar Moe / Aye Myat Thu	11-8, 11-3, 11-3

18 December 2013	Thailand	3–0	Laos

Komwong Nanthana	3–0	Douangpanya Seangdavieng	11-4, 13-11, 11-6
Khetkhuan Tamolwan	3–2	Southammavong Thiphakone	11-4, 10-12, 11-8, 6-11, 14-12
Muangsuk Anisara / Khetkhuan Tamolwan	3–0	Phimmatoun Sisangvan / Douangpanya Seangdavieng	11-2, 11-9, 11-6

=== Knockout round ===
Semifinals
X1	Singapore	3
Y2	Vietnam	0
X2	Malaysia	1
Y1	Thailand	3

Final
X1	Singapore	3
Y1	Thailand	0

==== Semifinals ====
19 December 2013	Singapore	3–0	Vietnam

Yu Mengyu	3–1	Hoang My Trang Mai	12-10, 11-6, 8-11, 12-10
Lin Ye	3–0	Thi Nga Nguyen	12-10, 11-7, 11-1
Zhou Yihan / Lin Ye	3–1	Hoang Tuong Giang Phan / Hoang My Trang Mai	12-10, 8-11, 11-4, 11-3

19 December 2013	Malaysia	1–3	Thailand

Rou You Lee	2–3	Khetkhuan Tamolwan	14-16, 6-11, 11-8, 11-4, 2-11
Lee Wei Beh	3–1	Komwong Nanthana	11-8, 8-11, 11-9, 11-5
Ying Ho / Lee Wei Beh	0–3	Muangsuk Anisara / Khetkhuan Tamolwan	6-11, 10-12, 9-11
Rou You Lee	0–3	Muangsuk Anisara	1-11, 4-11, 15-17

==== Final ====
19 December 2013	Singapore	3–0	Thailand

Yu Mengyu	3–0	Komwong Nanthana	11-2, 11-6, 11-5
Lin Ye	3–1	Khetkhuan Tamolwan	11-5, 7-11, 11-7, 11-6
Zhou Yihan / Lin Ye	3–1	Muangsuk Anisara / Khetkhuan Tamolwan	5-11, 11-5, 11-6, 11-8
