= Table tennis at the 2011 SEA Games =

- Venue: Soemantri Brodjonegoro Stadium
- Location: Jakarta, Indonesia
- Dates: 13–16 November

Table tennis at the 2011 SEA Games was held at Soemantri Brodjonegoro Stadium, Jakarta, Indonesia.

== Medal table ==
* Host nation (Indonesia)

Rank	Nation	Gold	Silver	Bronze	Total
1	Singapore (SIN)	5	4	0	9
2	Thailand (THA)	0	1	2	3
3	Vietnam (VIE)	0	0	4	4
4	Indonesia (INA)*	0	0	3	3
5	Philippines (PHI)	0	0	1	1
Totals (5 entries)		5	5	10	20

== Medal summary ==
Event	Gold	Silver	Bronze
Men's singles	Gao Ning; Singapore	Yang Zi; Singapore	Ficky Supit Santoso; Indonesia
Men's singles	Gao Ning; Singapore	Yang Zi; Singapore	Trần Tuấn Quỳnh; Vietnam
Women's singles	Feng Tianwei; Singapore	Isabelle Li; Singapore	Mai Hoàng Mỹ Trang; Vietnam
Women's singles	Feng Tianwei; Singapore	Isabelle Li; Singapore	Christine Ferliana; Indonesia
Men's doubles	Singapore; Ma Liang; Pang Xue Jie	Singapore; Gao Ning; Yang Zi	Philippines; Richard Gonzales; Rodel Valle
Men's doubles	Singapore; Ma Liang; Pang Xue Jie	Singapore; Gao Ning; Yang Zi	Thailand; Chaisit Chaitat; Nikom Wongsiri
Women's doubles	Singapore; Feng Tianwei; Sun Beibei	Thailand; Nanthana Komwong; Anisara Muangsuk	Vietnam; Mai Hoàng Mỹ Trang; Nguyễn Thị Việt Linh
Women's doubles	Singapore; Feng Tianwei; Sun Beibei	Thailand; Nanthana Komwong; Anisara Muangsuk	Indonesia; Christine Ferliana; Fauziah Yuliyanti
Mixed doubles	Singapore; Yang Zi; Sun Beibei	Singapore; Gao Ning; Feng Tianwei	Vietnam; Đinh Quang Linh; Mai Hoàng Mỹ Trang
Mixed doubles	Singapore; Yang Zi; Sun Beibei	Singapore; Gao Ning; Feng Tianwei	Thailand; Chaisit Chaitat; Nanthana Komwong
