= Table tennis at the 2019 SEA Games – Women's singles =

Table tennis – Women's singles at the 2019 SEA Games
- Venue: Subic Bay Exhibition & Convention Center
- Dates: 8–10 December 2019
- Competitors: 12 from 6 nations

Medalists
gold medal	Lin Ye (SGP)
silver medal	Feng Tianwei (SGP)
bronze medal	Nanthana Komwong (THA)
bronze medal	Suthasini Sawettabut (THA)

The women's singles competition of the table tennis events at the 2019 SEA Games was held from 8 to 10 December at the Subic Bay Exhibition & Convention Center in Subic Bay Freeport Zone, Zambales, Philippines.

== Schedule ==
All times are Philippines Time (UTC+08:00).

Date	Time	Round
8 December 2019	14:00	Preliminaries
9 December 2019	10:00	Preliminaries
10 December 2019	10:00	Semifinals
10 December 2019	14:00	Finals

== Results ==
=== Preliminary round ===
Source: Results (Groups) - Women's Singles

==== Group 1 ====
Player	Pld	W	L	GF	GA	PF	PA	Points
Feng Tianwei (SGP)	2	2	0	8	1	100	66	4
Mai Hoang My Trang (VIE)	2	1	1	5	2	92	90	3
Tee Xin (MAS)	2	0	2	1	8	64	100	2

8 Dec 14:00
Name	1	2	3	4	5	6	7	Match
Tee Xin (MAS)	5	11	3	9	9			1
Mai Hoang My Trang (VIE)	11	9	11	11	11			4
Report

9 Dec 10:00
Name	1	2	3	4	5	6	7	Match
Feng Tianwei (SGP)	11	11	8	12	11			4
Mai Hoang My Trang (VIE)	9	2	11	10	7			1
Report

9 Dec 16:00
Name	1	2	3	4	5	6	7	Match
Feng Tianwei (SGP)	11	11	11	14				4
Tee Xin (MAS)	7	5	3	12				0
Report

==== Group 2 ====
Player	Pld	W	L	GF	GA	PF	PA	Points
Suthasini Sawettabut (THA)	2	2	0	8	1	99	43	4
Rose Jean Fadol (PHI)	2	1	1	5	4	78	67	3
Soe Yanadar (MYA)	2	0	2	0	8	21	88	2

8 Dec 14:00
Name	1	2	3	4	5	6	7	Match
Rose Jean Fadol (PHI)	11	11	11	11				4
Soe Yanadar (MYA)	1	4	4	3				0
Report

9 Dec 10:00
Name	1	2	3	4	5	6	7	Match
Suthasini Sawettabut (THA)	11	11	11	11				4
Soe Yanadar (MYA)	3	2	3	1				0
Report

9 Dec 16:00
Name	1	2	3	4	5	6	7	Match
Suthasini Sawettabut (THA)	11	11	11	11	11			4
Rose Jean Fadol (PHI)	6	13	9	3	3			1
Report

==== Group 3 ====
Player	Pld	W	L	GF	GA	PF	PA	Points
Nanthana Komwong (THA)	2	2	0	8	2	106	61	4
Tran Mai Ngoc (VIE)	2	1	1	4	5	72	83	3
Jannah Romero (PHI)	2	0	2	3	8	82	116	2

8 Dec 14:40
Name	1	2	3	4	5	6	7	Match
Jannah Romero (PHI)	8	11	10	5	5			1
Tran Mai Ngoc (VIE)	11	9	12	11	11			4
Report

9 Dec 10:40
Name	1	2	3	4	5	6	7	Match
Nanthana Komwong (THA)	11	11	11	11				4
Tran Mai Ngoc (VIE)	5	6	3	4				0
Report

9 Dec 16:40
Name	1	2	3	4	5	6	7	Match
Nanthana Komwong (THA)	11	11	11	9	9	11		4
Jannah Romero (PHI)	6	3	5	11	11	7		2
Report

==== Group 4 ====
Player	Pld	W	L	GF	GA	PF	PA	Points
Lin Ye (SGP)	2	2	0	8	0	88	31	4
Alice Chang Sian (MAS)	3	1	1	4	4	64	75	3
Win Naing Naing (MYA)	3	0	2	0	8	42	88	2

8 Dec 14:40
Name	1	2	3	4	5	6	7	Match
Alice Chang Sian (MAS)	11	11	11	11				4
Win Naing Naing (MYA)	7	7	8	9				0
Report

9 Dec 10:40
Name	1	2	3	4	5	6	7	Match
Lin Ye (SGP)	11	11	11	11				4
Win Naing Naing (MYA)	2	3	4	2				0
Report

9 Dec 16:40
Name	1	2	3	4	5	6	7	Match
Lin Ye (SGP)	11	11	11	11				4
Alice Chang Sian (MAS)	8	3	4	5				0
Report

=== Knockout round ===
Semifinals; 10 December 11:20
Feng Tianwei (SGP)	4
Nanthana Komwong (THA)	3
Lin Ye (SGP)	4
Suthasini Sawettabut (THA)	2

Gold-medal match 10 December 14:45
Feng Tianwei (SGP)	1
Lin Ye (SGP)	4

==== Semifinals ====
10 Dec 10:00
Name	1	2	3	4	5	6	7	Match
Feng Tianwei (SGP)	7	3	8	11	11	11	11	4
Nanthana Komwong (THA)	11	11	11	3	4	4	4	3
Report

10 Dec 10:40
Name	1	2	3	4	5	6	7	Match
Lin Ye (SGP)	11	6	11	2	11	11		4
Suthasini Sawettabut (THA)	7	11	8	11	8	5		2
Report

==== Gold-medal match ====
10 Dec 14:00
Name	1	2	3	4	5	6	7	Match
Feng Tianwei (SGP)	11	1	0	0	0			1
Lin Ye (SGP)	6	11	0	0	0			4 (Win by Retired)
Report
