= Table tennis at the 2015 SEA Games – Women's team =

Table tennis – Women's team at the 2015 SEA Games
- Venue: Singapore Indoor Stadium
- Dates: 6–8 June 2015
- Competitors: 26 from 6 nations

Medalists
gold medal	Singapore (SIN)
silver medal	Thailand (THA)
bronze medal	Vietnam (VIE)
bronze medal	Malaysia (MAS)

The women's team competition of the table tennis event at the 2015 SEA Games were held from 6 to 8 June at the Singapore Indoor Stadium in Singapore.

== Schedule ==
Date	Time	Round
Saturday, 6 June 2015	14:00	Preliminaries
Sunday, 7 June 2015	14:00	Preliminaries
Monday, 8 June 2015	13:00	Semifinals
Monday, 8 June 2015	18:00	Finals

== Results ==
=== Preliminary round ===
Source: Results (Groups) - Women's Team

==== Group A ====
Player	Pld	W	L	GF	GA	PF	PA	Points
Singapore (SIN)	2	2	0	18	0	198	79	4
Vietnam (VIE)	2	1	1	9	9	144	144	3
Laos (LAO)	2	0	2	0	18	79	198	2

6 June 2015; 14:00	Singapore	3–0	Laos

	Individual matches
Yu Mengyu	3–0	Sannivad Thipphalak	11 – 5, 11 – 2, 11 – 4
Lin Ye	3–0	Douangpanya Seangdavieng	11 – 8, 11 – 3, 11 – 5
Zhou Yihan	3–0	Phimmayou Sisangvan	11 – 3, 11 – 1, 11 – 3

6 June 2015; 19:30	Singapore	3–0	Vietnam

	Individual matches
Lin Ye	3–0	Phan Hoang Tuong Giang	11 – 6, 11 – 2, 11 – 6
Yu Mengyu	3–0	Vu Thi Ha	11 – 6, 11 – 6, 11 – 5
Li Isabelle Si Yun	3–0	Pham Thi Thien Kim	11 – 5, 11 – 3, 11 – 6

7 June 2015; 14:00	Vietnam	3–0	Laos

	Individual matches
Nguyễn Thị Nga	3–0	Douangpanya Seangdavieng	11 – 8, 11 – 9, 11 – 4
Mai Hoang My Trang	3–0	Sannivad Thipphalak	11 – 3, 11 – 5, 11 – 7
Phan Hoang Tuong Giang	3–0	Phimmayou Sisangvan	11 – 5, 11 – 3, 11 – 1

==== Group B ====
Player	Pld	W	L	GF	GA	PF	PA	Points
Thailand (THA)	2	2	0	18	1	205	144	4
Malaysia (MAS)	2	1	1	9	15	200	233	3
Indonesia (INA)	2	0	2	7	18	188	246	2

6 June 2015; 14:00	Thailand	3–0	Indonesia

	Individual matches
Komwong Nanthana	3–0	Hawwa Kharisma Nur	11 – 3, 11 – 5, 11 – 6
Khetkhuan Tamolwan	3–0	Indriani Lilis	11 – 4, 11 – 5, 11 – 4
Paranang Orawan	3–1	Dwijayanit Gustin	6 – 11, 11 – 8, 11 – 1, 11 – 8

6 June 2015; 19:30	Thailand	3–0	Malaysia

	Individual matches
Khetkhuan Tamolwan	3–0	Ng Sock Khim	11 – 9, 11 – 7, 11 – 4
Komwong Nanthana	3–0	Lee Rou You	11 – 5, 12 – 10, 11 – 3
Paranang Orawan	3–0	Ho Ying	11 – 7, 11 – 5, 11 – 9

7 June 2015; 14:00	Malaysia	3–1	Indonesia

	Individual matches
Ng Sock Khim	3–0	Hawwa Kharisma Nur	11 – 5, 11 – 7, 11 – 9
Lee Rou You	3–2	Dwijayanit Gustin	7 – 11, 11 – 8, 6 – 11, 12 – 10, 12 – 10
Ho Ying	0–3	Indriani Lilis	6 – 11, 6 – 11, 6 – 11
Ng Sock Khim	3–1	Dwijayanit Gustin	11 – 8, 9 – 11, 11 – 7, 11 – 3

=== Knockout round ===
Source: Results - Women's Team

Semifinals; 8 June 13:00
Malaysia	0
Singapore	3
Thailand	3
Vietnam	1

Gold medal match 8 June 18:00
Singapore	3
Thailand	2

==== Semifinals ====
8 June 2015; 13:00	Malaysia	0–3	Singapore

	Individual matches
Ng Sock Khim	2–3	Yu Mengyu	13 – 11, 6 – 11, 6 – 11, 12 – 10, 5 – 11
Lee Rou You	0–3	Feng Tianwei	6 – 11, 8 – 11, 2 – 11
Tang Angeline An Qi	0–3	Li Isabelle Si Yun	8 – 11, 2 – 11, 2 – 11

8 June 2015; 13:00	Thailand	3–1	Vietnam

Report	Individual matches
Komwong Nanthana	3–1	Nguyễn Thị Nga	8 – 11, 11 – 6, 11 – 8, 11 – 7
Khetkhuan Tamolwan	0–3	Mai Hoang My Trang	7 – 11, 7 – 11, 5 – 11
Paranang Orawan	3–0	Phan Hoang Tuong Giang	11 – 6, 11 – 6, 11 – 4
Komwong Nanthana	3–1	Mai Hoang My Trang	11 – 6, 12 – 10, 11 – 13, 11 – 6

==== Gold medal match ====
8 June 2015; 18:00	Thailand	2–3	Singapore

	Individual matches
Komwong Nanthana	3–1	Yu Mengyu	11 – 7, 8 – 11, 12 – 10, 11 – 9
Khetkhuan Tamolwan	1–3	Feng Tianwei	11 – 13, 10 – 12, 11 – 7, 6 – 11
Paranang Orawan	3–2	Li Isabelle Si Yun	7 – 11, 11 – 9, 11 – 5, 8 – 11, 11 – 7
Komwong Nanthana	0–3	Feng Tianwei	10 – 12, 8 – 11, 1 – 11
Khetkhuan Tamolwan	1–3	Yu Mengyu	12 – 10, 2 – 11, 13 – 15, 5 – 11
