= Lin Ye (table tennis) =

Chinese-born Singaporean table tennis player

Personal information
- Native name: 林叶
- Nationality: Singapore
- Born: 1 February 1996 (age 30) Zhangjiajie, Hunan, China
- Height: 1.62 m (5 ft 4 in)
- Weight: 58 kg (128 lb; 9.1 st)

Sport
- Sport: Table tennis
- Playing style: Right-handed shakehand grip
- Highest ranking: 34 (August 2014)
- Current ranking: 62 (March 2022)
Medal record
Women's Table Tennis
Representing Singapore
Asian Games
Bronze medal – third place	2014 Incheon	Team
Asian Championships
Bronze medal – third place	2019 Yogyakarta	Team
Bronze medal – third place	2021 Doha	Team
Commonwealth Games
Gold medal – first place	2014 Glasgow	Team
Silver medal – second place	2018 Gold Coast	Team
Bronze medal – third place	2014 Glasgow	Singles
Southeast Asian Games
Gold medal – first place	2013 Naypyidaw	Team
Gold medal – first place	2015 Singapore	Doubles
Gold medal – first place	2015 Singapore	Team
Gold medal – first place	2017 Kuala Lumpur	Team
Gold medal – first place	2019 Philippines	Singles
Silver medal – second place	2017 Kuala Lumpur	Doubles
Bronze medal – third place	2019 Philippines	Doubles

Lin Ye
- Simplified Chinese: 林叶
Transcriptions
Standard Mandarin
- Hanyu Pinyin: Lín Yè

Lin Ye (Chinese: 林叶, born 1 February 1996) is a Chinese-born Singaporean table tennis player. Born in China, Lin started playing table tennis at the age of 8. She later moved to Singapore where she obtained citizenship in 2013 via the Foreign Sports Talent Scheme. Lin was named the Young Player of the Year in 2013 and 2014.

Lin won a team gold and singles bronze medal at the 2014 Commonwealth Games.

On 2 June 2015, Lin and her compatriot, Zhou Yihan, defeated top seed Feng Tianwei and Yu Mengyu 4–3 to clinch the Women Doubles title in 28th Southeast Asian Games held in Singapore. The pair continued their good momentum and caused one of the biggest upset in history when they defeated the top doubles pair Ding Ning and Liu Shiwen 3–0 in ITTF World Tour, Japan Open Semi-Final but lost to another China pair of Wu Yang and Liu Fei in the Final.

On 12 December 2015, Lin defeated Hamamoto Yui of Japan to clinch the U21 singles title in ITTF World Tour Grand Finals held in Lisbon, Portugal. This is her second U21 singles title.
