= Kang Mi-soon =

South Korean table tennis player

Personal information
- Nationality: Chinese (before 2008); South Korean (after 2008)
- Born: Jiang Meishun; 16 February 1993 (age 33) Daqing, Heilongjiang, China
- Height: 165 cm (5 ft 5 in)
- Weight: 62 kg (137 lb)

Sport
- Sport: Table tennis
- Playing style: Left-handed shakehand grip
- Highest ranking: 30 (March 2011)

Kang Mi-soon

Chinese name
- Traditional Chinese: 姜美順
- Simplified Chinese: 姜美顺
Transcriptions
Standard Mandarin
- Hanyu Pinyin: Jiāng Měishùn

Korean name
- Hangul: 강미순
Transcriptions
- Revised Romanization: Gang Misun

Kang Mi-soon (Korean: 강미순; Hanja: 姜美順; Chinese: 姜美顺, born 16 February 1993) is a Chinese-South Korean table tennis player. An ethnic Korean born in China, she became a naturalized South Korean in 2008.

Playing for a club in Qingdao at age 14, Kang was ranked No. 6 in China's second division, when she emigrated to South Korea. Her mother had settled in South Korea two years prior, in 2005.
