= Isabelle Li =

Singaporean table tennis player (born 1994)

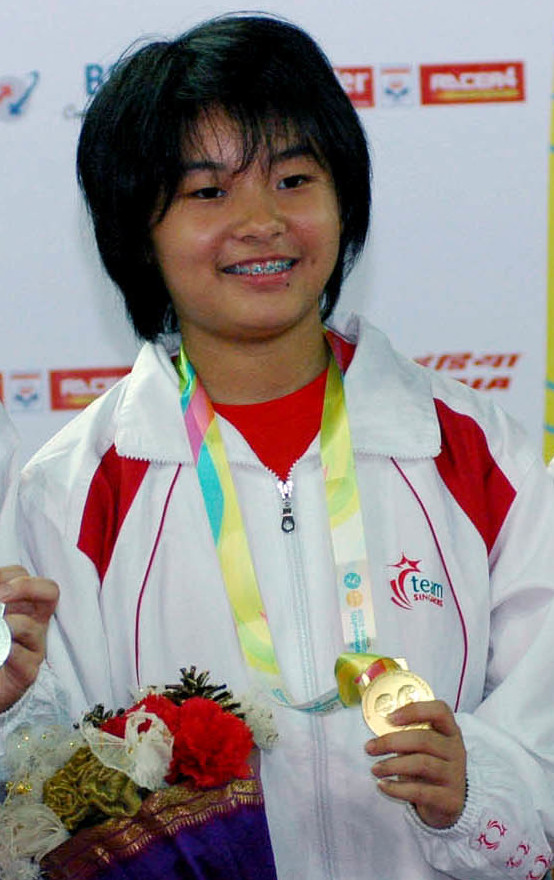
- Li at the 2008 Commonwealth Youth Games

Personal information
- Full name: Li Siyun Isabelle
- Born: August 28, 1994 (age 32) Singapore

Sport
- Sport: Table tennis
- Playing style: Right-hand shakehand grip
Medal record
Women's Table tennis
Representing Singapore
World Championships
Bronze medal – third place	2014 Tokyo	Team
World Cup
Bronze medal – third place	2013 Guangzhou	Team
Bronze medal – third place	2015 Dubai	Team
Asian Games
Bronze medal – third place	2014 Incheon	Team
Commonwealth Games
Gold medal – first place	2014 Glasgow	Team
Southeast Asian Games
Gold medal – first place	2013 Naypyidaw	Team
Gold medal – first place	2015 Singapore	Team
Silver medal – second place	2011 Jakarta-Palembang	Singles
Silver medal – second place	2013 Naypyidaw	Singles
Summer Youth Olympics
Silver medal – second place	2010 Singapore	Singles
Commonwealth Youth Games
Gold medal – first place	2008 Pune	Singles

Isabelle Li Siyun (born 28 August 1994) is a Singaporean table tennis player who was part of the team that won the women's team event at the 2014 Commonwealth Games. She won a gold medal at the 2008 Commonwealth Youth Games, a silver medal in the women's singles event at the 2010 Summer Youth Olympics, and multiple medals in Southeast Asian Games events.

== Personal life ==
Li went to Chongfu Primary School and Singapore Sports School. She took up table tennis whilst in primary school and also performed Chinese-style dancing. In 2015, Li started studying liberal arts at Yale-NUS College, where she received a scholarship.

== Career ==
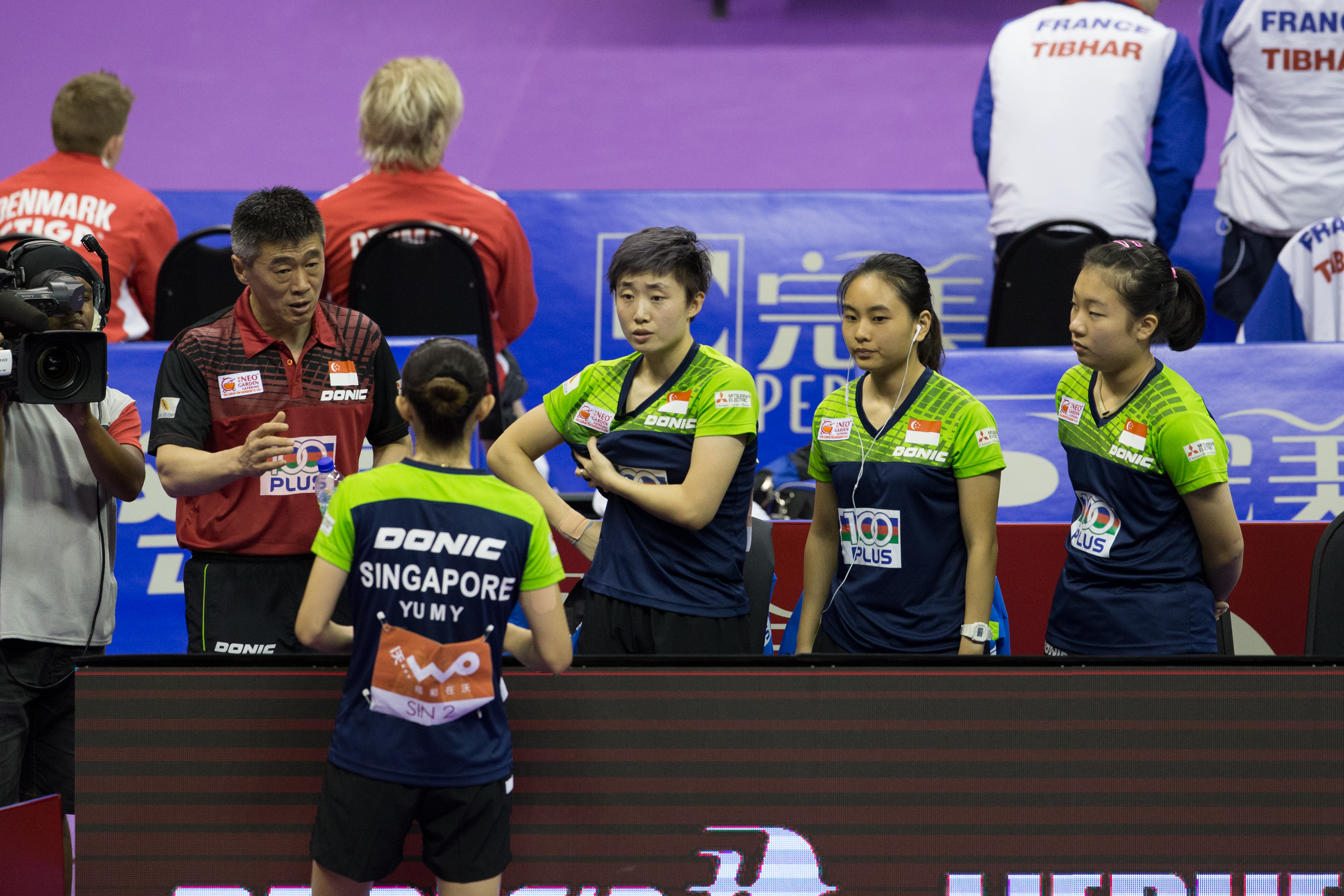
Singapore team, including Li, at the 2016 World Team Table Tennis Championships.

Li first competed for Singapore at the age of 11, making her the country's youngest-ever table tennis player. Li won the girls' singles event at the 2008 Commonwealth Youth Games. She competed at the 2009 Asian Youth Games in Singapore. She won a silver medal in the women's singles event at the 2010 Summer Youth Olympics in Singapore, losing to China's Gu Yuting in the final. After the final, Li received a standing ovation from the crowd of 5,000. Li won a silver medal in the women's individual event at the 2011 Southeast Asian Games. In 2013, Li was part of the Singapore team that won gold medals at the Commonwealth Table Tennis Championships and South East Asian Games, as well as winning a silver medal in the individual event at the Southeast Asian Games. Li was part of the Singapore team that won the women's team event at the 2014 Commonwealth Games. Li was one of two Singaporean-born athletes in the Singapore table tennis squad; many of the squad were originally from China.

Li again finished second in the women's team event at the 2015 Southeast Asian Games, beating Hong Kong's Lee Ho Ching in the quarter finals. She was knocked out in the group stages of the women's individual event, having played with a knee injury. Due to her knee injury, Li did not compete for the rest of the 2015, and her next competitive tournament was the 2016 World Team Table Tennis Championships in Kuala Lumpur, Malaysia. That was her last competitive event. In 2017, Li received $55,000 from the Singapore Table Tennis Association as recognition for her achievements.
