= Nanthana Komwong =

Thai table tennis player (born 1980)

Personal information
- Native name: นันทนา คำวงศ์
- Full name: Nanthana Komwong
- Born: 13 September 1980 (age 45) Lampang, Thailand
- Height: 1.58 m (5 ft 2 in)
- Weight: 53 kg (117 lb; 8.3 st)

Sport
- Sport: Table tennis
- Playing style: Right-handed, shakehand grip
Medal record
Women's table tennis
Representing Thailand
Event	1st	2nd	3rd
Summer Universiade	0	0	1
Southeast Asian Games	0	13	17
Total	0	13	18
Summer Universiade
Bronze medal – third place	2007 Bangkok	Singles
Southeast Asian Games
Silver medal – second place	1999 Bandar Seri Begawan	Singles
Silver medal – second place	1999 Bandar Seri Begawan	Team
Silver medal – second place	2001 Kuala Lumpur	Singles
Silver medal – second place	2001 Kuala Lumpur	Mixed doubles
Silver medal – second place	2001 Kuala Lumpur	Team
Silver medal – second place	2005 Manila	Team
Silver medal – second place	2007 Nakhon Ratchasima	Team
Silver medal – second place	2009 Vientiane	Team
Silver medal – second place	2011 Jakarta-Palembang	Doubles
Silver medal – second place	2013 Naypyidaw	Team
Silver medal – second place	2015 Singapore	Team
Silver medal – second place	2017 Kuala Lumpur	Team
Silver medal – second place	2019 Philippines	Doubles
Bronze medal – third place	1999 Bandar Seri Begawan	Doubles
Bronze medal – third place	2003 Vietnam	Singles
Bronze medal – third place	2003 Vietnam	Doubles
Bronze medal – third place	2003 Vietnam	Mixed doubles
Bronze medal – third place	2003 Vietnam	Team
Bronze medal – third place	2005 Manila	Singles
Bronze medal – third place	2005 Manila	Doubles
Bronze medal – third place	2007 Nakhon Ratchasima	Singles
Bronze medal – third place	2007 Nakhon Ratchasima	Doubles
Bronze medal – third place	2007 Nakhon Ratchasima	Mixed doubles
Bronze medal – third place	2009 Vientiane	Singles
Bronze medal – third place	2009 Vientiane	Doubles
Bronze medal – third place	2009 Vientiane	Mixed doubles
Bronze medal – third place	2011 Jakarta-Palembang	Mixed doubles
Bronze medal – third place	2015 Singapore	Doubles
Bronze medal – third place	2017 Kuala Lumpur	Singles
Bronze medal – third place	2019 Philippines	Singles

Nanthana Komwong (Thai: นันทนา คำวงศ์; RTGS: Nanthana Khamwong; born 13 September 1980) is a Thai table tennis player.

At the 2000 Olympics, she did not win through beyond the group stage. She reached the third round in 2004, losing to Viktoria Pavlovich. She competed at the 2008 Summer Olympics, reaching the second round of the singles competition. She also reached the second round at the 2012 Summer Olympics, losing to Iveta Vacenovska.

She was born in Lampang, and resides in Bangkok.
