= Ankita Das =

Indian table tennis player

Personal information
- Full name: Ankita Das
- Nationality: Indian
- Born: 17 July 1993 (age 33) Siliguri, West Bengal, India
- Height: 5.6
- Weight: 53

Sport
- Sport: Table tennis
- Club: German club II division league YMA club at Siliguri
- Playing style: Right-handed offensive
- Equipment: Before butterfly and Now stag
Medal record
cadet National- singles gold Sub junior national- singles gold 2 times Junior national gold in singles 2 time’s Youth national gold in singles 3times And one time silver Senior national- one time gold in singles and team year 2013 Senior national- bronze in women’s singles

Ankita Das (Bengali: অঙ্কিতা দাস; born 17 July 1993) is an Indian table tennis player from Siliguri, West Bengal. She participated in the World Championship and reached the quarter-finals.

She represented India at the 2012 London Summer Olympics in Women's singles event. She was also the youngest girl in that Olympic.

== Career ==
Ankita Das has won senior championship at the 75th senior National table tennis championships (2014)

Das has won championship at the 75th senior National Table Tennis Championships (2014) Women's singles event. before was practicing under of Coach Mantu Gosh Arjuna Awardee. she was the youngest girl in that olympic. she played in junior world championship 2011, singles quarterfinalist and got fair play award. she made history in that tournament, she got most popular player award in senior Asian championship, made history again, 10 years she played national final continues in her career, its history in Indian table tennis. she played cadet world challenge, and got gold medal in the teams, and singles got 8th position, she played lusofonia games and got bronze, silver, gold in that tournament.

== See also ==
- India at the 2012 Summer Olympics
- Table tennis at the 2012 Summer Olympics
- Table tennis at the 2012 Summer Olympics – Qualification
