= Table tennis at the SEA Games =

Table tennis has been competed in the Southeast Asian Games since the inaugural edition when the Games was titled the South East Asian Peninsular Games in 1959 Bangkok, Thailand.

== Editions ==
Games	Year	Host City	Events	Best nation
SEAP Games
I	1959	(Thailand) Bangkok	2	
II	1961	(Myanmar) Rangoon	5	
III	1965	(Malaysia) Kuala Lumpur	7	
IV	1967	(Thailand) Bangkok	5	
V	1969	(Myanmar) Rangoon	5	
VI	1971	(Malaysia) Kuala Lumpur	7	
VII	1973	Singapore	7	Singapore
VIII	1975	(Thailand) Bangkok	7	Malaysia
SEA Games
IX	1977	(Malaysia) Kuala Lumpur	7	
X	1979	(Indonesia) Jakarta	7	
XI	1981	(Philippines) Manila	7	Indonesia
XII	1983	Singapore	7	Indonesia
XIII	1985	(Thailand) Bangkok	7	
XIV	1987	(Indonesia) Jakarta	7	Indonesia
XV	1989	(Malaysia) Kuala Lumpur	7	
XVI	1991	(Philippines) Manila	7	Indonesia
XVII	1993	Singapore	7	Indonesia
XVIII	1995	(Thailand) Chiang Mai	7	Indonesia
XIX	1997	(Indonesia) Jakarta	7	Indonesia
XX	1999	(Brunei) Bandar Seri Begawan	7	Singapore

Games	Year	Host City	Events	Best nation
XXI	2001	(Malaysia) Kuala Lumpur	7	Singapore
XXII	2003	(Vietnam) Hanoi & Ho Chi Minh City	7	Singapore
XXIII	2005	(Philippines) Manila	7	Singapore
XXIV	2007	(Thailand) Nakhon Ratchasima	7	Singapore
XXV	2009	(Laos) Vientiane	7	Singapore
XXVI	2011	(Indonesia) Jakarta & Palembang	5	Singapore
XXVII	2013	(Myanmar) Naypyidaw	4	Singapore
XXVIII	2015	Singapore	7	Singapore
XXIX	2017	(Malaysia) Kuala Lumpur	7	Singapore
XXX	2019	Philippines	4	Singapore
XXXI	2021	Vietnam	7	Thailand
XXXII	2023	Cambodia	7	Singapore
XXXIII	2025	Thailand	7	Singapore

== Events ==
=== SEAP Games(1959-75) & SEA Games(1977-99) ===
Event	59	61	65	67	69	71	73	75	77	79	81	83	85	87	89	91	93	95	97	99	Years
Men's singles		X	X	X	X	X	X	X	X	X	X	X	X	X	X	X	X	X	X	X	19
Men's doubles		X	X	X	X	X	X	X	X	X	X	X	X	X	X	X	X	X	X	X	19
Men's team	X	X	X	X	X	X	X	X	X	X	X	X	X	X	X	X	X	X	X	X	20
Women's singles		X	X	X	X	X	X	X	X	X	X	X	X	X	X	X	X	X	X	X	19
Women's doubles		X	X	X	X	X	X	X	X	X	X	X	X	X	X	X	X	X	X	X	19
Women's team	X	X	X	X	X	X	X	X	X	X	X	X	X	X	X	X	X	X	X	X	20
Mixed doubles		X	X	X	X	X	X	X	X	X	X	X	X	X	X	X	X	X	X	X	19
Total	2	7	7	7	7	7	7	7	7	7	7	7	7	7	5	7	7	7	7	7	

=== SEA Games(2001 - Present) ===
Event	01	03	05	07	09	11	13	15	17	19	21	23	25	Years
Men's singles	X	X	X	X	X	X	X	X	X	X	X	X	X	13
Men's doubles	X	X	X	X	X	X		X	X	X	X	X	X	12
Men's team	X	X	X	X	X		X	X	X		X	X	X	11
Women's singles	X	X	X	X	X	X	X	X	X	X	X	X	X	13
Women's doubles	X	X	X	X	X	X		X	X	X	X	X	X	12
Women's team	X	X	X	X	X		X	X	X		X	X	X	11
Mixed doubles	X	X	X	X	X	X		X	X		X	X	X	11
Total	7	7	7	7	7	5	4	7	7	4	7	7	7	

== Medal table ==
=== SEA Games (1995 - Present) ===
Rank	Nation	Gold	Silver	Bronze	Total
1	Singapore (SGP)	71	38	33	142
2	Thailand (THA)	13	27	51	91
3	Indonesia (INA)	11	16	31	58
4	Vietnam (VIE)	9	11	45	65
5	Malaysia (MAS)	0	8	37	45
6	Philippines (PHI)	0	3	10	13
7	Myanmar (MYA)	0	1	1	2
Totals (7 entries)		104	104	208	416

== See also ==
- Table tennis at the Summer Olympics
- Table tennis at the Asian Games
- South East Asian Table Tennis Championships
