= Table tennis at the 2009 SEA Games – Men's singles =

Table tennis – Men's singles at the 2009 SEA Games
- Venue: Convention Hall, National University
- Dates: 8 – 15 December 2009
- Competitors: 18 from 9 nations

Medalists
gold medal	Gao Ning	Singapore
silver medal	Yang Zi	Singapore
bronze medal	Richard Gonzales	Philippines
bronze medal	Phakpoom Sanguansin	Thailand

The men's singles competition of the table tennis event at the 2009 SEA Games was held from 8 to 15 December at the Convention Hall, National University of Laos in Vientiane, Laos.

== Participating nations ==
A total of 18 athletes from nine nations competed in men's singles table tennis at the 2009 Southeast Asian Games:

- Cambodia (2)
- Indonesia (2)
- Laos (2)
- Malaysia (2)
- Myanmar (2)
- Philippines (2)
- Singapore (2)
- Thailand (2)
- Vietnam (2)

== Schedule ==
All times are Laos Time (UTC+07:00).

== Results ==
=== Group round ===
==== Group A ====
Team	Pld	W	L	GW	GL	Pts
(Singapore) Gao Ning	3	3	0	9	0	6
(Malaysia) Muhd Shakirin Ibrahim	3	2	1	6	5	5
(Indonesia) Muhammad Hussein	3	1	2	5	7	4
(Myanmar) Ko Ko Gyi	3	0	3	1	9	3

==== Group B ====
Team	Pld	W	L	GW	GL	Pts
(Philippines) Richard Gonzales	3	2	1	7	4	5+1.083
(Vietnam) Nguyen Nam Hai	3	2	1	7	4	5+1.052
(Indonesia) Ficky Supit Santoso	3	2	1	7	4	5+0.868
(Cambodia) Tang Hov	3	0	3	0	9	3

==== Group C ====
Team	Pld	W	L	GW	GL	Pts
(Singapore) Yang Zi	4	4	0	12	1	8
(Thailand) Phuchong Sanguansin	4	3	1	9	3	7
(Philippines) Rodel Ireneo Portigo Valle	4	2	2	6	6	6
(Malaysia) Chai Kian Beng	4	1	3	6	11	5
(Laos) Chansamone Khunladsuvannavong	4	0	4	2	12	4

==== Group D ====
Team	Pld	W	L	GW	GL	Pts
(Thailand) Phakpoom Sanguansin	4	4	0	12	2	8
(Vietnam) Doan Kien Quoc	4	3	1	11	4	7
(Myanmar) Thet Ko Ko Latt	4	2	2	7	7	6
(Laos) Misay Phonsavat	4	1	3	4	9	5
(Cambodia) Ngoy Buthong	4	0	4	0	12	4

=== Elimination rounds ===
Semi-finals
(Singapore) Gao Ning	11	7	11	11	12
(Philippines) Richard Gonzales	6	11	6	5	10
(Singapore) Yang Zi	11	11	11	11
(Thailand) Phakpoom Sanguansin	4	9	5	6

Final
(Singapore) Gao Ning	11	11	9	11	11
(Singapore) Yang Zi	5	9	11	9	2
