= Table tennis at the 2007 SEA Games – Men's team =

Table tennis – Men's team at the 2007 SEA Games
- Venue: Klang Plaza
- Dates: 3–5 December 2007
- Competitors: 39 from 9 nations

Medalists
gold medal	Singapore (SIN)
silver medal	Thailand (THA)
bronze medal	Indonesia (INA)
bronze medal	Vietnam (VIE)

The men's team competition of the table tennis event at the 2007 SEA Games will be held from 3 to 5 December 2007 at the Klang Plaza in Nakhon Ratchasima, Thailand.

== Schedule ==
All times are Thailand Time (UTC+07:00).

Date	Time	Round
Monday, 3 December 2007	10:00	Preliminaries
Tuesday, 4 December 2007	10:00	Preliminaries
Wednesday, 5 December 2007	10:00	Semifinals
Wednesday, 5 December 2007	15:00	Finals

== Results ==
=== Preliminary round ===
==== Pool 1 ====
Team	Pld	W	L	MF	MA	GF	GA	F-A	Pts
Singapore (SIN)	3	3	0	9	2	27	8	363:243	6
Thailand (THA)	3	2	1	8	3	25	11	353:274	5
Philippines (PHI)	3	1	2	3	6	12	18	231:258	4
Cambodia (CAM)	3	0	3	0	9	0	27	126:298	3

3 December 2007; 19:00	Singapore	3–2	Thailand

Report	Individual matches
Gao Ning	3–1	Phakpoom Sanguansin	9 – 11, 11 – 7, 11 – 3, 12 – 10
Yang Zi	0–3	Phuchong Sanguansin	9 – 11, 5 – 11, 7 – 11
Cai Xiaoli	0–3	Chaisit Chaitat	9 – 11, 12 – 14, 5 – 11
Yang Zi	3–0	Phakpoom Sanguansin	11 – 4, 11 – 8, 11 – 4
Gao Ning	3–0	Phuchong Sanguansin	11 – 8, 11 – 4, 11 – 9

3 December 2007; 19:00	Cambodia	0–3	Philippines

Report	Individual matches
Sam Boroath	0–3	Richard Gonzales	5 – 11, 7 – 11, 1 – 11
Huot Sovathanak	0–3	Julius Esposo	6 – 11, 5 – 11, 3 – 11
Sun Roathana	0–3	Henberd Ortalla	2 – 11, 2 – 11, 3 – 11

4 December 2007; 10:00	Singapore	3–0	Philippines

Report	Individual matches
Gao Ning	3–0	Henberd Ortalla	11 – 2, 11 – 4, 11 – 9
Yang Zi	3–1	Richard Gonzales	11 – 8, 11 – 2, 8 – 11, 11 – 7
Cai Xiaoli	3–0	Rodel Ireneo Valle	11 – 5, 11 – 2, 11 – 4

4 December 2007; 10:00	Thailand	3–0	Cambodia

Report	Individual matches
Chaisit Chaitat	3–0	Sam Boroath	11 – 3, 11 – 2, 11 – 8
Phakpoom Sanguansin	3–0	Huot Sovathanak	11 – 4, 11 – 4, 11 – 4
Tanawat Vipawatanakul	3–0	Sun Roathana	11 – 7, 11 – 7, 11 – 3

4 December 2007; 19:00	Philippines	0–3	Thailand

Report	Individual matches
Richard Gonzales	0–3	Phakpoom Sanguansin	1 – 11, 4 – 11, 11 – 13
Henberd Ortalla	1–3	Phuchong Sanguansin	10 – 12, 11 – 9, 4 – 11, 6 – 11
Julius Esposo	1–3	Chaisit Chaitat	2 – 11, 11 – 6, 9 – 11, 9 – 11

4 December 2007; 19:00	Singapore	3–0	Cambodia

Report	Individual matches
Ho Jia Ren Jason	3–0	Sam Boroath	11 – 7, 11 – 6, 12 – 10
Cai Xiaoli	3–0	Ngoy Bunthong	11 – 1, 11 – 3, 11 – 2
Pang Xuejie	3–0	Huot Sovathanak	11 – 8, 11 – 7, 11 – 8

==== Pool 2 ====
Team	Pld	W	L	MF	MA	GF	GA	F-A	Pts
Vietnam (VIE)	4	4	0	12	2	39	15	552:389	8
Indonesia (INA)	4	3	1	11	3	36	13	495:363	7
Malaysia (MAS)	4	2	2	6	6	22	18	359:337	6
Laos (LAO)	4	1	3	3	10	9	31	261:397	5
Myanmar (MYA)	4	0	4	1	12	7	36	272:453	4

3 December 2007; 10:00	Indonesia	3–0	Myanmar

Report	Individual matches
Muhammad Hussein	3–0	Ye Aung Naing	11 – 8, 11 – 8, 11 – 5
Yon Mardiyono	3–1	Thet Ko Ko Lat	11 – 6, 11 – 2, 10 – 12, 11 – 6
Handoyo Reno	3–0	Lin Zaw Oo	14 – 2, 11 – 4, 11 – 2

3 December 2007; 10:00	Malaysia	3–0	Laos

Report	Individual matches
Ibrahim Muhd Shakirin	3–0	Syphaphone Heuang Outhay	11 – 1, 12 – 10, 11 – 4
Chai Kian Beng	3–0	Phonsavath Misay	11 – 9, 12 – 10, 11 – 7
Kho Mao Sheng	3–0	Xayaphat Korakanh	11 – 4, 11 – 9, 11 – 3

3 December 2007; 13:00	Vietnam	3–0	Laos

Report	Individual matches
Nguyen Nam Hai	3–0	Syphaphone Heuang Outhay	11 – 6, 11 – 3, 11 – 4
Tran Tuan Quynh	3–0	Phonsavath Misay	11 – 7, 11 – 5, 11 – 3
Doan Kien Quoc	3–0	Khunladsuvannavong Chansamone	11 – 4, 11 – 3, 11 – 6

3 December 2007; 13:00	Myanmar	0–3	Malaysia

Report	Individual matches
Ye Aung Naing	0–3	Chai Kian Beng	8 – 11, 3 – 11, 4 – 11
Lin Zaw Oo	0–3	Ibrahim Muhd Shakirin	5 – 11, 7 – 11, 2 – 11
Thet Ko Ko Lat	0–3	Kho Mao Sheng	9 – 11, 6 – 11, 7 – 11

3 December 2007; 19:00	Vietnam	3–0	Malaysia

Report	Individual matches
Doan Kien Quoc	3–2	Chai Kian Beng	11 – 4, 11 – 5, 9 – 11, 3 – 11, 11 – 7
Tran Tuan Quynh	3–0	Ibrahim Muhd Shakirin	11 – 7, 11 – 5, 11 – 7
Nguyen Nam Hai	3–2	Kho Mao Sheng	11 – 5, 10 – 12, 9 – 11, 11 – 3, 11 – 4

3 December 2007; 19:00	Laos	0–3	Indonesia

Report	Individual matches
Khunladsuvannavong Chansamone	0–3	Yon Mardiyono	3 – 11, 1 – 11, 5 – 11
Phonsavath Misay	0–3	Muhammad Hussein	6 – 11, 3 – 11, 8, – 11
Xaykaotho Khouanhchith	0–3	David Jacobs	2 – 11, 0 – 11, 4 – 11

4 December 2007; 10:00	Vietnam	3–2	Indonesia

Report	Individual matches
Doan Kien Quoc	3–2	Yon Mardiyono	9 – 11, 11 – 7, 11 – 9, 7 – 11, 11 – 8
Tran Tuan Quynh	2–3	Muhammad Hussein	11 – 9, 6 – 11, 9 – 11, 12 – 10, 10 – 12
Nguyen Nam Hai	3–1	David Jacobs	8 – 11, 11 – 7, 11 – 3, 11 – 5
Doan Kien Quoc	1–3	Muhammad Hussein	11 – 7, 8 – 11, 5 – 11, 11 – 13
Tran Tuan Quynh	3–0	Yon Mardiyono	14 – 12, 11 – 5, 11 – 4

4 December 2007; 10:00	Laos	3–1	Myanmar

Report	Individual matches
Syphaphone Heuang Outhay	0–3	Thet Ko Ko Lat	3 – 11, 11 – 13, 10 – 12
Phonsavath Misay	3–0	Ye Aung Naing	11 – 7, 11 – 6, 11 – 4
Khunladsuvannavong Chansamone	3–0	Sein Lin	11 – 5, 11 – 4, 11 – 7
Phonsavath Misay	3–1	Thet Ko Ko Lat	8 – 11, 11 – 4, 11 – 5, 11 – 9

4 December 2007; 19:00	Indonesia	3–0	Malaysia

Report	Individual matches
Yon Mardiyono	3–0	Ibrahim Muhd Shakirin	11 – 6, 11 – 8, 11 – 9
Muhammad Hussein	3–0	Chai Kian Beng	11 – 7, 11 – 8, 11 – 6
Reno Handoyo	3–0	Kho Mao Sheng	11 – 8, 11 – 8, 11 – 7

4 December 2007; 19:00	Vietnam	3–0	Myanmar

Report	Individual matches
Tran Tuan Quynh	3–0	Ye Aung Naing	11 – 1, 11 – 7, 13 – 11
Dinh Quang linh	3–0	Lin Zaw Oo	11 – 4, 11 – 3, 11 – 2
Do Duc Duy	3–2	Thet Ko Ko Lat	5 – 11, 11 – 8, 8 – 11, 11 – 5, 11 – 5

=== Knockout round ===
Semifinals; 5 December 10:00
Singapore	3
Indonesia	1
Thailand	3
Vietnam	1

Gold medal match 5 December 15:00
Singapore	3
Thailand	0

==== Semifinals ====
5 December 2007; 10:00	Singapore	3–0	Indonesia

Report	Individual matches
Gao Ning	3–1	Yon Mardiyono	11 – 8, 11 – 5, 11 – 6
Yang Zi	3–0	Muhammad Hussein	11 – 6, 11 – 3, 11 – 8
Cai Xiaoli	2–3	Reno Handoyo	14 – 16, 13 – 11, 11 – 0, 9 – 11, 9 – 11
Gao Ning	3–1	Yon Mardiyono	11 – 5, 4 – 11, 11 – 4, 11 – 6

5 December 2007; 10:00	Thailand	3–1	Vietnam

Report	Individual matches
Phakpoom Sanguansin	2–3	Doan Kien Quoc	11 – 9, 11 – 4, 8 – 11, 9 – 11, 2 – 11
Phuchong Sanguansin	3–0	Ibrahim Muhd Shakirin	11 – 7, 11 – 4, 14 – 12
Chaisit Chaitat	3–2	Nguyen Nam Hai	11 – 6, 10 – 12, 14 – 12, 5 – 11, 11 – 4
Phuchong Sanguansin	3–1	Doan Kien Quoc	12 – 10, 5 – 11, 13 – 11, 11 – 6

==== Gold medal match ====
5 December 2007; 15:00	Singapore	3–0	Thailand

Report	Individual matches
Gao Ning	3–2	Phakpoom Sanguansin	11 – 4, 9 – 11, 9 – 11, 11 – 3, 13 – 11
Yang Zi	3–1	Phuchong Sanguansin	8 – 11, 11 – 4, 14 – 12, 11 – 8
Cai Xiaoli	3–0	Chaisit Chaitat	11 – 6, 11 – 2, 11 – 7

Preceded by 2005	Table tennis at the SEA Games; 2007 SEA Games	Succeeded by 2019
