= Table tennis at the 2009 SEA Games – Men's doubles =

Men's doubles table tennis competition, 2009 Southeast Asian Games in Vientiane, Laos

Table tennis – Men's doubles at the 2009 SEA Games
- Venue: Convention Hall, National University
- Dates: 8 – 15 December 2009
- Competitors: 36 from 9 nations

Medalists
gold medal	Doan Kien Quoc; Dinh Quang Linh	Vietnam
silver medal	Tran Tuan Quynh; Nguyen Nam Hai	Vietnam
bronze medal	Gao Ning; Yang Zi	Singapore
bronze medal	Cai Xiaoli; Pang Xue Jie	Singapore

The men's doubles competition of the table tennis event at the 2009 SEA Games was held from 8 to 15 December at the Convention Hall of the National University of Laos in Vientiane.

== Participating nations ==
A total of 36 athletes from nine nations competed in mixed doubles table tennis at the 2009 Southeast Asian Games:

- Cambodia (4)
- Indonesia (4)
- Laos (4)
- Malaysia (4)
- Myanmar (4)
- Philippines (4)
- Singapore (4)
- Thailand (4)
- Vietnam (4)

== Schedule ==
All times are Laos Time (UTC+07:00).

== Results ==
Preliminary Round 1
(Singapore) Gao Ning (Singapore) Yang Zi
(Laos) Thavisack Phathaphone (Laos) Somsanith Panouvong
(Cambodia) Khun Phannith (Cambodia) Sam Borath
(Indonesia) Muhammad Hussein (Indonesia) Ficky Supit Santoso
(Vietnam) Doan Kien Quoc (Vietnam) Dinh Quang Linh
(Myanmar) Aung Htut (Myanmar) Maung Maung Gyi	3	15	8	5
(Malaysia) Kho Mao Sheng (Malaysia) Muhamad AHMR	11	13	11	11
(Philippines) Ting Chua Ledesma (Philippines) Rodel Ireneo Portigo Valle
(Thailand) Phakpoom Sanguansin (Thailand) Phuchong Sanguansin
(Indonesia) David Jacobs (Indonesia) Yon Mardiyono
(Philippines) Henberd Cabrer Ortalla (Philippines) Richard Gonzales
(Myanmar) Thet Ko Ko Latt (Myanmar) Ko Ko Gyi	11	6	7	10
(Laos) Misay Phonsavat (Laos) C Khunladsuvannavong	8	11	11	12
(Singapore) Cai Xiaoli (Singapore) Pang Xue Jie
(Vietnam) Tran Tuan Quynh (Vietnam) Nguyen Nam Hai
(Thailand) Chaisit Chaitat (Thailand) Nikom Wongsiri
(Cambodia) Ngoy Buthong (Cambodia) Tang Hov
(Malaysia) Muhd Shakirin Ibrahim (Malaysia) Chai Kian Beng

Preliminary Round 2
(Singapore) Gao Ning (Singapore) Yang Zi	11	11	11
(Laos) Thavisack Phathaphone (Laos) Somsanith Panouvong	4	4	5
(Cambodia) Khun Phannith (Cambodia) Sam Borath	3	4	5
(Indonesia) Muhammad Hussein (Indonesia) Ficky Supit Santoso	11	11	11
(Vietnam) Doan Kien Quoc (Vietnam) Dinh Quang Linh	11	11	11
(Malaysia) Kho Mao Sheng (Malaysia) Muhamad AHMR	8	2	6
(Philippines) Ting Chua Ledesma (Philippines) Rodel Ireneo Portigo Valle	8	7	3
(Thailand) Phakpoom Sanguansin (Thailand) Phuchong Sanguansin	11	11	11
(Indonesia) David Jacobs (Indonesia) Yon Mardiyono	11	14	11	7	11
(Philippines) Henberd Cabrer Ortalla (Philippines) Richard Gonzales	3	16	3	11	4
(Laos) Misay Phonsavat (Laos) C Khunladsuvannavong	4	3	8
(Singapore) Cai Xiaoli (Singapore) Pang Xue Jie	11	11	11
(Vietnam) Tran Tuan Quynh (Vietnam) Nguyen Nam Hai	6	11	11	11
(Thailand) Chaisit Chaitat (Thailand) Nikom Wongsiri	11	8	9	7
(Cambodia) Ngoy Buthong (Cambodia) Tang Hov	1	5	4
(Malaysia) Muhd Shakirin Ibrahim (Malaysia) Chai Kian Beng	11	11	11

Quarter Final
(Singapore) Gao Ning (Singapore) Yang Zi	11	11	11
(Indonesia) Muhammad Hussein (Indonesia) Ficky Supit Santoso	8	4	9
(Vietnam) Doan Kien Quoc (Vietnam) Dinh Quang Linh	12	5	11	12
(Thailand) Phakpoom Sanguansin (Thailand) Phuchong Sanguansin	10	11	3	10
(Indonesia) David Jacobs (Indonesia) Yon Mardiyono	9	11	11	8	4
(Singapore) Cai Xiaoli (Singapore) Pang Xue Jie	11	9	9	11	11
(Vietnam) Tran Tuan Quynh (Vietnam) Nguyen Nam Hai	11	11	8	11
(Malaysia) Muhd Shakirin Ibrahim (Malaysia) Chai Kian Beng	6	3	11	7

Semi Final
(Singapore) Gao Ning (Singapore) Yang Zi	7	6	12	6
(Vietnam) Doan Kien Quoc (Vietnam) Dinh Quang Linh	11	11	10	11
(Singapore) Cai Xiaoli (Singapore) Pang Xue Jie	6	9	6
(Vietnam) Tran Tuan Quynh (Vietnam) Nguyen Nam Hai	11	11	11

Gold Medal Match
(Vietnam) Doan Kien Quoc (Vietnam) Dinh Quang Linh	11	7	11	11
(Vietnam) Tran Tuan Quynh (Vietnam) Nguyen Nam Hai	7	11	4	7
