= Table tennis at the 2009 SEA Games – Men's team =

Table tennis – Men's team at the 2009 SEA Games
- Venue: Convention Hall, National University
- Dates: 8 – 10 December 2009
- Nations: 9

Medalists
gold medal	Singapore (SIN)
silver medal	Thailand (THA)
bronze medal	Indonesia (INA)
bronze medal	Vietnam (VIE)

The men's team competition of the table tennis event at the 2009 SEA Games was held from 8 to 10 December at the Convention Hall, National University of Laos in Vientiane, Laos.

== Schedule ==
All times are Laos Time (UTC+07:00).

Date	Time	Round
Tuesday, 8 December 2009	10:00	Group Round
Thursday, 9 December 2009	10:00	Group Round
Friday, 10 December 2009	10:00	Semifinals
Friday, 10 December 2009	14:00	Finals

== Results ==
=== Group round ===
==== Group A ====
Team	Pld	W	L	GW	GL	Pts
Singapore	3	3	0	9	1	6
Indonesia	3	2	1	6	3	5
Philippines	3	1	2	4	6	4
Cambodia	3	0	3	0	9	3

2009-12-08; 20:00	(Report)	Philippines	1–3	Singapore	Convention Hall, National University, Vientiane
Score by game:
Rodel Ireneo Portigo Valle	0–3	Gao Ning
Richard Gonzales	3–2	Yang Zi
Ting Chua Ledesma	0–3	Cai Xiaoli
Rodel Ireneo Portigo Valle	0–3	Yang Zi

2009-12-08; 20:00	(Report)	Cambodia	0–3	Indonesia	Convention Hall, National University, Vientiane
Score by game:
Ngoy Buthong	0–3	Ficky Supit Santoso
Khun Phannith	0–3	Muhammad Hussein
Tang Hov	0–3	Yon Mardiyono

2009-12-09; 10:00	(Report)	Indonesia	0–3	Singapore	Convention Hall, National University, Vientiane
Score by game:
Muhammad Hussein	0–3	Yang Zi
Ficky Supit Santoso	0–3	Gao Ning
Yon Mardiyono	1–3	Cai Xiaoli

2009-12-09; 10:00	(Report)	Cambodia	0–3	Philippines	Convention Hall, National University, Vientiane
Score by game:
Ngoy Buthong	0–3	Rodel Ireneo Portigo Valle
Sam Borath	0–3	Richard Gonzales
Tang Hov	0–3	Henberd Cabrer Ortalla

2009-12-09; 19:00	(Report)	Singapore	3–0	Cambodia	Convention Hall, National University, Vientiane
Score by game:
Gao Ning	3–0	Tang Hov
Pang Xie Jie	3–0	Khun Phannith
Yang Zi	3–0	Ngoy Buthong

2009-12-09; 19:05	(Report)	Philippines	0–3	Indonesia	Convention Hall, National University, Vientiane
Score by game:
Richard Gonzales	0–3	Yon Mardiyono
Ting Chua Ledesma	0–3	Muhammad Hussein
Henberd Cabrer Ortalla	0–3	David Jacobs

==== Group B ====
Team	Pld	W	L	GW	GL	Pts
Thailand	4	4	0	12	3	8
Vietnam	4	3	1	10	3	7
Malaysia	4	2	2	7	7	6
Myanmar	4	1	3	5	10	5
Laos	4	0	4	1	12	4

2009-12-08; 10:10	(Report)	Vietnam	3–0	Myanmar	Convention Hall, National University, Vientiane
Score by game:
Doan Kien Quoc	3–0	Maung Maung Gyi
Nguyen Nam Hai	3–0	Ko Ko Gyi
Tran Tuan Quynh	3–0	Kyi Myint

2009-12-08; 10:02	(Report)	Malaysia	3–0	Laos	Convention Hall, National University, Vientiane
Score by game:
Muhd Shakirin Ibrahim	3–0	Chansamone Khunladsuvannavong
Chai Kian Being	3–0	Misay Phonsavat
Kho Mao Sheng	3–0	Thavisack Phathaphone

2009-12-08; 14:00	(Report)	Laos	0–3	Thailand	Convention Hall, National University, Vientiane
Score by game:
Misay Phonsavat	0–3	Phuchong Sanguansin
Chansamone Khunladsuvannavong	0–3	Phakpoom Sanguansin
Thavisack Phathaphone	0–3	Chaisit Chaitat

2009-12-08; 14:00	(Report)	Malaysia	3–1	Myanmar	Convention Hall, National University, Vientiane
Score by game:
Muhd Shakirin Ibrahim	3–1	Thet Ko Ko Latt
Chai Kian Being	1–3	Ko Ko Gyi
Kho Mao Sheng	3–0	Maung Maung Gyi
Muhd Shakirin Ibrahim	3–0	Ko Ko Gyi

2009-12-08; 20:00	(Report)	Thailand	3–1	Malaysia	Convention Hall, National University, Vientiane
Score by game:
Phakpoom Sanguansin	3–1	Chai Kian Being
Phuchong Sanguansin	1–3	Muhd Shakirin Ibrahim
Chaisit Chaitat	3–0	Kho Mao Sheng
Phakpoom Sanguansin	3–0	Muhd Shakirin Ibrahim

2009-12-08; 20:05	(Report)	Vietnam	3–0	Laos	Convention Hall, National University, Vientiane
Score by game:
Dinh Quang Linh	3–0	Chansamone Khunladsuvannavong
Tran Tuan Quynh	3–0	Misay Phonsavat
Phan Huy Hoang	3–0	Somsanith Panouvong

2009-12-09; 10:00	(Report)	Vietnam	1–3	Thailand	Convention Hall, National University, Vientiane
Score by game:
Doan Kien Quoc	2–3	Phuchong Sanguansin
Nguyen Nam Hai	0–3	Phakpoom Sanguansin
Tran Tuan Quynh	3–1	Chaisit Chaitat
Doan Kien Quoc	1–3	Phakpoom Sanguansin

2009-12-09; 10:00	(Report)	Laos	1–3	Myanmar	Convention Hall, National University, Vientiane
Score by game:
Chansamone Khunladsuvannavong	2–3	Thet Ko Ko Latt
Misay Phonsavat	1–3	Ko Ko Gyi
Thavisack Phathaphone	3–1	Kyi Myint
Chansamone Khunladsuvannavong	0–3	Ko Ko Gyi

2009-12-09; 19:00	(Report)	Thailand	3–1	Myanmar	Convention Hall, National University, Vientiane
Score by game:
Yuttana Tubbunmee	2–3	Ko Ko Gyi
Nikom Wongsiri	3–0	Maung Maung Gyi
Chaisit Chaitat	3–0	Thet Ko Ko Latt
Yuttana Tubbunmee	3–0	Maung Maung Gyi

2009-12-09; 19:00	(Report)	Vietnam	3–0	Malaysia	Convention Hall, National University, Vientiane
Score by game:
Doan Kien Quoc	3–0	Chai Kian Being
Tran Tuan Quynh	3–0	Muhd Shakirin Ibrahim
Nguyen Nam Hai	3–2	Kho Mao Sheng

== Elimination rounds ==
Semi-finals
Singapore	3	2	2	3	3
Vietnam	2	3	3	0	0
Thailand	3	3	2	3
Indonesia	1	1	3	1

Final
Singapore	3	3	3
Thailand	0	1	1

=== Semi-finals ===
2009-12-10; 10:00	(Report)	Singapore	3–2	Vietnam	Convention Hall, National University, Vientiane
2009-12-10; 10:00	(Report)	Score by game:			Convention Hall, National University, Vientiane
2009-12-10; 10:00	(Report)	Gao Ning	3–2	Doan Kien Quoc	Convention Hall, National University, Vientiane
Yan Zi			2–3	Nguyen Nam Hai
Cai Xiaoli			2–3	Tran Tuan Quynh
Gao Ning			3–0	Nguyen Nam Hai
Yan Zi			3–0	Doan Kien Quoc
			–

2009-12-10; 10:00	(Report)	Thailand	3–1	Indonesia	Convention Hall, National University, Vientiane
Score by game:
Phakpoom Sanguansin	3–1	Yon Mardiyono
Phuchong Sanguansin	3–1	Muhammad Hussein
Chaisit Chaitat	2–3	David Jacobs
Phakpoom Sanguansin	3–1	Muhammad Hussein

=== Final ===
2009-12-10; 14:00	(Report)	Singapore	3–0	Thailand	Convention Hall, National University, Vientiane
Score by game:
Gao Ning	3–0	Phakpoom Sanguansin
Yan Zi	3–1	Phuchong Sanguansin
Cai Xiaoli	3–1	Chaisit Chaitat
