= Table tennis at the 2009 SEA Games – Mixed doubles =

Table tennis – Mixed doubles at the 2009 SEA Games
- Venue: Convention Hall, National University
- Dates: 8 – 15 December 2009
- Competitors: 32 from 8 nations

Medalists
gold medal	Yang Zi; Wang Yuegu	Singapore
silver medal	Gao Ning; Feng Tianwei	Singapore
bronze medal	Muhd Shakirin Ibrahim; Beh Lee Wei	Malaysia
bronze medal	Phakpoom Sanguansin; Nanthana Komwong	Thailand

The mixed doubles competition of the table tennis event at the 2009 SEA Games was held from 8 to 15 December at the Convention Hall, National University of Laos in Vientiane, Laos.

== Participating nations ==
A total of 32 athletes from eight nations competed in mixed doubles table tennis at the 2009 Southeast Asian Games:

- Indonesia (4)
- Laos (4)
- Malaysia (4)
- Myanmar (4)
- Philippines (4)
- Singapore (4)
- Thailand (4)
- Vietnam (4)

== Schedule ==
All times are Laos Time (UTC+07:00).

== Results ==
Preliminary Round
(Thailand) Phakpoom Sanguansin (Thailand) Nanthana Komwong	11	11	11
(Laos) Chansamone Khunladsuvannavong (Laos) Seangdavanh Duangpanya	8	1	7
(Myanmar) Ko Ko Gyi (Myanmar) Naw Norend	8	11	11	6	7
(Malaysia) Chai Kian Being (Malaysia) Chiu Soo Jiin	11	7	9	11	11
(Indonesia) Yon Mardiyono (Indonesia) Silir Rovani	6	6	11	12	11
(Vietnam) Dinh Quang Linh (Vietnam) Luong Thi Tam	11	11	9	10	8
(Philippines) Rodel Ireneo Portigo Valle (Philippines) Chrisma Mendoza Capistrano	6	6	5
(Singapore) Gao Ning (Singapore) Feng Tianwei	11	11	11
(Singapore) Yang Zi (Singapore) Wang Yuegu	11	11	11
(Myanmar) Thet Ko Ko Latt (Myanmar) Khin Khin Win	4	3	5
(Laos) Misay Phonsavat (Laos) Thippakone Southammavong	12	4	8	10
(Vietnam) Nguyen Nam Hai (Vietnam) Mai Hoang My Trang	10	11	11	12
(Malaysia) Muhd Shakirin Ibrahim (Malaysia) Beh Lee Wei	11	11	11
(Philippines) Ting Chua Ledesma (Philippines) Beverly Villar	7	7	6
(Indonesia) Gilang Maulana (Indonesia) Noor Azizah Dwi Agustin	11	11	7	11
(Thailand) Phuchong Sanguansin (Thailand) Anisara Muangsuk	9	7	11	8

Quarter Final
(Thailand) Phakpoom Sanguansin (Thailand) Nanthana Komwong	11	11	9	11
(Malaysia) Chai Kian Being (Malaysia) Chiu Soo Jiin	9	2	11	3
(Indonesia) Yon Mardiyono (Indonesia) Silir Rovani	7	6	12	4
(Singapore) Gao Ning (Singapore) Feng Tianwei	11	11	10	11
(Singapore) Yang Zi (Singapore) Wang Yuegu	15	13	11
(Vietnam) Nguyen Nam Hai (Vietnam) Mai Hoang My Trang	13	11	5
(Malaysia) Muhd Shakirin Ibrahim (Malaysia) Beh Lee Wei	16	11	11
(Indonesia) Gilang Maulana (Indonesia) Noor Azizah Dwi Agustin	14	5	6

Semi Final
(Thailand) Phakpoom Sanguansin (Thailand) Nanthana Komwong	12	6	5	3
(Singapore) Gao Ning (Singapore) Feng Tianwei	10	11	11	11
(Singapore) Yang Zi (Singapore) Wang Yuegu	11	11	9	11
(Malaysia) Muhd Shakirin Ibrahim (Malaysia) Beh Lee Wei	5	5	11	3

Gold Medal Match
(Singapore) Gao Ning (Singapore) Feng Tianwei	11	10	13	11	4
(Singapore) Yang Zi (Singapore) Wang Yuegu	9	12	15	4	11
