= Table tennis at the 2009 SEA Games – Women's team =

Table tennis – Women's team at the 2009 SEA Games
- Venue: Convention Hall, National University
- Dates: 8 – 10 December 2009
- Nations: 8

Medalists
gold medal	Singapore (SIN)
silver medal	Thailand (THA)
bronze medal	Malaysia (MAS)
bronze medal	Vietnam (VIE)

The women's team competition of the table tennis event at the 2009 SEA Games was held from 8 to 10 December at the Convention Hall, National University of Laos in Vientiane, Laos.

== Schedule ==
All times are Laos Time (UTC+07:00).

Date	Time	Round
Tuesday, 8 December 2009	10:00	Group Round
Thursday, 9 December 2009	14:00	Group Round
Friday, 10 December 2009	10:00	Semifinals
Friday, 10 December 2009	14:00	Finals

== Results ==
=== Group round ===
==== Group A ====
Team	Pld	W	L	GW	GL	Pts
Singapore	3	3	0	9	0	6
Vietnam	3	2	1	6	3	5
Laos	3	1	2	3	6	4
Philippines	3	0	3	0	9	3

8 December 2009; 10:00	(Report)	Laos	0–3	Singapore	Convention Hall, National University, Vientiane
Score by game:
Seangdavieng Douangpanya	0–3	Yu Mengyu
Seangdavanh Duangpanya	0–3	Sun Beibei
Thippakone Southammavong	0–3	Sim Kai Xin Zena

8 December 2009; 10:00	(Report)	Vietnam	3–0	Philippines	Convention Hall, National University, Vientiane
Score by game:
Mai Hoang My Trang	3–0	Chrisma Mendoza Capistrano
Mai Xuan Hang	3–0	Beverly Villar
Luong Thi Tam	3–0	Henezey Landicho Aragon

8 December 2009; 17:00	(Report)	Vietnam	0–3	Singapore	Convention Hall, National University, Vientiane
Score by game:
Mai Hoang My Trang	0–3	Wang Yuegu
Mai Xuan Hang	0–3	Feng Tianwei
Pham Thi Thien Kim	0–3	Sim Kai Xin Zena

8 December 2009; 17:00	(Report)	Philippines	0–3	Laos	Convention Hall, National University, Vientiane
Score by game:
Henezey Landicho Aragon	0–3	Seangdavanh Duangpanya
Beverly Villar	0–3	Seangdavieng Douangpanya
Chrisma Mendoza Capistrano	0–3	Thippakone Southammavong

9 December 2009; 14:06	(Report)	Singapore	3–0	Philippines	Convention Hall, National University, Vientiane
Score by game:
Feng Tianwei	3–0	Beverly Villar
Sun Beibei	3–0	Chrisma Mendoza Capistrano
Sim Kai Xin Zena	3–0	Henezey Landicho Aragon

9 December 2009; 14:00	(Report)	Vietnam	3–0	Laos	Convention Hall, National University, Vientiane
Score by game:
Mai Hoang My Trang	3–0	Seangdavanh Duangpanya
Mai Xuan Hang	3–0	Seangdavieng Douangpanya
Luong Thi Tam	3–0	Thippakone Southammavong

==== Group B ====
Team	Pld	W	L	GW	GL	Pts
Thailand	3	3	0	9	2	6
Malaysia	3	2	1	8	4	5
Myanmar	3	1	2	4	6	4
Indonesia	3	0	3	0	9	3

8 December 2009; 14:00	(Report)	Indonesia	0–3	Thailand	Convention Hall, National University, Vientiane
Score by game:
Silir Rovani	0–3	Anisara Muangsuk
Ceria Nilsari Jusma	0–3	Nanthana Komwong
Widya Wulansari	0–3	Suthasini Sawettabut

8 December 2009; 14:00	(Report)	Myanmar	1–3	Malaysia	Convention Hall, National University, Vientiane
Score by game:
Naw Norend	3–0	Fan Xiao Jun
Khin Khin Win	1–3	Beh Lee Wei
Aye Aye Mar	2–3	Chiu Soo Jiin
Naw Norend	0–3	Beh Lee Wei

8 December 2009; 17:00	(Report)	Thailand	3–2	Malaysia	Convention Hall, National University, Vientiane
8 December 2009; 17:00	(Report)	Score by game:			Convention Hall, National University, Vientiane
8 December 2009; 17:00	(Report)	Nanthana Komwong	3–0	Chiu Soo Jiin	Convention Hall, National University, Vientiane
Anisara Muangsuk			0–3	Beh Lee Wei
Suthasini Sawettabut			3–2	Fan Xiao Jun
Nanthana Komwong			1–3	Beh Lee Wei
Anisara Muangsuk			3–0	Chiu Soo Jiin
			–

8 December 2009; 17:00	(Report)	Myanmar	3–0	Indonesia	Convention Hall, National University, Vientiane
Score by game:
Naw Norend	3–0	Ceria Nilsari Jusma
Khin Khin Win	3–1	Silir Rovani
Aye Aye Mar	3–0	Yudha Ngesti Pratiwi

8 December 2009; 17:00	(Report)	Thailand	3–0	Myanmar	Convention Hall, National University, Vientiane
Score by game:
Nanthana Komwong	3–0	Khin Khin Win
Anisara Muangsuk	3–0	Naw Norend
Suthasini Sawettabut	3–0	Aye Aye Mar

9 December 2009; 14:00	(Report)	Indonesia	0–3	Malaysia	Convention Hall, National University, Vientiane
Score by game:
Silir Rovani	2–3	Fan Xiao Jun
Yudha Ngesti Pratiwi	0–3	Beh Lee Wei
Widya Wulansari	0–3	Chiu Soo Jiin

=== Elimination rounds ===
Semi-finals
Singapore	3	3	3
Malaysia	0	0	0
Thailand	3	3	3
Vietnam	0	0	2

Final
Singapore	3	3	3
Thailand	0	0	0

==== Semi-finals ====
10 December 2009; 10:00	(Report)	Malaysia	0–3	Singapore	Convention Hall, National University, Vientiane
Score by game:
Fan Xiao Jun	0–3	Wang Yuegu
Beh Lee Wei	0–3	Feng Tianwei
Chiu Soo Jiin	0–3	Sun Beibei

10 December 2009; 10:00	(Report)	Vietnam	0–3	Thailand	Convention Hall, National University, Vientiane
Score by game:
Mai Hoang My Trang	0–3	Anisara Muangsuk
Mai Xuan Hang	0–3	Nanthana Komwong
Luong Thi Tam	0–3	Suthasini Sawettabut

==== Final ====
10 December 2009; 14:00	(Report)	Thailand	0–3	Singapore	Convention Hall, National University, Vientiane
Score by game:
Nanthana Komwong	0–3	Wang Yuegu
Suthasini Sawettabut	0–3	Feng Tianwei
Anisara Muangsuk	0–3	Sun Beibei
