= Table tennis at the 2009 SEA Games – Women's doubles =

Table tennis – Women's doubles at the 2009 SEA Games
- Venue: Convention Hall, National University
- Dates: 8 – 15 December 2009
- Competitors: 30 from 8 nations

Medalists
gold medal	Sun Beibei; Yu Mengyu	Singapore
silver medal	Wang Yuegu; Feng Tianwei	Singapore
bronze medal	Anisara Muangsuk; Nanthana Komwong	Thailand
bronze medal	Mai Hoang My Trang; Mai Xuan Hang	Vietnam

The women's doubles competition of the table tennis event at the 2009 SEA Games was held from 8 to 15 December at the Convention Hall, National University of Laos in Vientiane, Laos.

== Participating nations ==
A total of 30 athletes from eight nations competed in mixed doubles table tennis at the 2009 Southeast Asian Games:

- Indonesia (4)
- Laos (4)
- Malaysia (4)
- Myanmar (4)
- Philippines (2)
- Singapore (4)
- Thailand (4)
- Vietnam (4)

== Schedule ==
All times are Laos Time (UTC+07:00).

== Results ==
Preliminary Round
(Singapore) Sun Beibei (Singapore) Yu Mengyu
(Indonesia) Silir Rovani (Indonesia) Yudha Ngesti Pratiwi	11	13	11	11
(Thailand) Suthasini Sawettabut (Thailand) Priyakan Triampo	4	15	9	2
(Vietnam) Mai Hoang My Trang (Vietnam) Mai Xuan Hang	11	11	11
(Laos) Soulinda Sysavath (Laos) Thippakone Southammavong	3	3	6
(Myanmar) Naw Norend (Myanmar) Swe Swe Han	12	8	9
(Malaysia) Beh Lee Wei (Malaysia) Fan Xiao Jun	14	11	11
(Singapore) Wang Yuegu (Singapore) Feng Tianwei	11	11	11
(Laos) Seangdavieng Douangpanya (Laos) Seangdavanh Duangpanya	7	4	7
(Myanmar) Khin Khin Win (Myanmar) Aye Aye Mar	11	11	11
(Indonesia) Ceria Nilsari Jusma (Indonesia) Noor Azizah Dwi Agustin	8	6	5
(Malaysia) Chiu Soo Jiin (Malaysia) Ho Ying	8	11	11	5	11
(Philippines) Beverly Villar (Philippines) Henezey Landicho Aragon	11	6	7	11	5
(Vietnam) Luong Thi Tam (Vietnam) Pham Thi Thien Kim	9	3	8
(Thailand) Anisara Muangsuk (Thailand) Nanthana Komwong	11	11	11

Quarter Final
(Singapore) Sun Beibei (Singapore) Yu Mengyu	11	11	11
(Indonesia) Silir Rovani (Indonesia) Yudha Ngesti Pratiwi	2	8	5
(Vietnam) Mai Hoang My Trang (Vietnam) Mai Xuan Hang	10	11	14	12	11
(Malaysia) Beh Lee Wei (Malaysia) Fan Xiao Jun	12	6	16	10	4
(Singapore) Wang Yuegu (Singapore) Feng Tianwei	11	11	11
(Myanmar) Khin Khin Win (Myanmar) Aye Aye Mar	7	3	2
(Malaysia) Chiu Soo Jiin (Malaysia) Ho Ying	3	3	7
(Thailand) Anisara Muangsuk (Thailand) Nanthana Komwong	11	11	11

Semi Final
(Singapore) Sun Beibei (Singapore) Yu Mengyu	12	12	11
(Vietnam) Mai Hoang My Trang (Vietnam) Mai Xuan Hang	10	10	6
(Singapore) Wang Yuegu (Singapore) Feng Tianwei	11	11	6	11
(Thailand) Anisara Muangsuk (Thailand) Nanthana Komwong	8	4	11	9

Gold Medal Match
(Singapore) Sun Beibei (Singapore) Yu Mengyu	3	11	11	11
(Singapore) Wang Yuegu (Singapore) Feng Tianwei	11	8	5	7
