= Table tennis at the 2007 SEA Games – Women's team =

Table tennis – Women's team at the 2007 SEA Games
- Venue: Klang Plaza
- Dates: 3–5 December 2007
- Competitors: 36 from 8 nations

Medalists
gold medal	Singapore (SIN)
silver medal	Thailand (THA)
bronze medal	Malaysia (MAS)
bronze medal	Vietnam (VIE)

The women's team competition of the table tennis event at the 2007 SEA Games will be held from 3 to 5 December 2007 at the Klang Plaza in Nakhon Ratchasima, Thailand.

== Schedule ==
All times are Thailand Time (UTC+07:00).

Date	Time	Round
Monday, 3 December 2007	10:00	Preliminaries
Tuesday, 4 December 2007	14:00	Preliminaries
Wednesday, 5 December 2007	10:00	Semifinals
Wednesday, 5 December 2007	15:00	Finals

== Results ==
=== Preliminary round ===
==== Pool 1 ====
Team	Pld	W	L	MF	MA	GF	GA	F-A	Pts
Singapore (SIN)	3	3	0	9	0	27	1	306:110	6
Malaysia (MAS)	3	2	1	6	3	19	9	365:191	5
Laos (LAO)	3	1	2	3	6	9	21	185:296	4
Myanmar (MYA)	3	0	3	0	9	3	27	158:298	3

3 December 2007; 10:00	Singapore	3–0	Malaysia

Report	Individual matches
Li Jiawei	3–1	Beh Lee Wei	9 – 11, 11 – 7, 11 – 5, 11 – 9
Wang Yuegu	3–0	Ng Sock Khim	11 – 7, 11 – 4, 11 – 3
Sun Beibei	3–0	Chaisit Chaitat	11 – 3, 11 – 9, 11 – 9

3 December 2007; 10:00	Laos	3–0	Myanmar

Report	Individual matches
Southammavong Thiphakone	3–0	Swe Swe Han	11 – 7, 11 – 9, 12 – 10
Douangpanya Seangdavieng	3–1	Aye Myat Thu	11 – 9, 11 – 3, 4 – 11, 11 – 9
Manychanh Dalavone	3–2	Thandar Aung	11 – 4, 11 – 5, 8 – 11, 7 – 11, 11 – 9

3 December 2007; 16:00	Singapore	3–0	Myanmar

Report	Individual matches
Yu Mengyu	3–0	Swe Swe Han	11 – 2, 11 – 2, 11 – 2
Tan Paey Fern	3–0	Aye Myat Thu	11 – 1, 11 – 3, 11 – 4
Li Jiawei	3–0	Thandar Aung	11 – 2, 11 – 1, 11 – 5

3 December 2007; 16:00	Malaysia	3–0	Laos

Report	Individual matches
Beh Lee Wei	3–0	Douangpanya Seangdavieng	11 – 4, 11 – 4, 11 – 7
Ng Sock Khim	3–0	Southammavong Thiphakone	11 – 2, 11 – 6, 11 – 7
Chiu Soo Jiin	3–0	Douangpanya Seangdavieng	11 – 5, 11 – 4, 11 – 6

4 December 2007; 14:00	Myanmar	0–3	Malaysia

Report	Individual matches
Swe Swe Han	0–3	Ng Sock Khim	3 – 11, 2 – 11, 8 – 11
Aye Myat Thu	0–3	Beh Lee Wei	1 – 11, 7 – 11, 1 – 11
Thandar Aung	0–3	Chiu Soo Jiin	6 – 11, 3 – 11, 7 – 11

4 December 2007; 14:00	Singapore	3–0	Laos

Report	Individual matches
Li Jiawei	3–0	Manychanh Dalavone	11 – 2, 11 – 2, 11 – 5
Wang Yuegu	3–0	Southammavong Thiphakone	11 – 3, 11 – 1, 11 – 4
Sun Beibei	3–0	Douangpanya Seangdavieng	11 – 1, 11 – 1, 11 – 2

==== Pool 2 ====
Team	Pld	W	L	MF	MA	GF	GA	F-A	Pts
Thailand (THA)	3	3	0	9	1	29	6	371:234	6
Vietnam (VIE)	3	2	1	7	4	23	16	377:332	5
Indonesia (INA)	3	1	2	4	7	16	23	333:376	4
Philippines (PHI)	3	0	3	1	9	5	28	207:346	3

3 December 2007; 13:00	Thailand	3–1	Vietnam

Report	Individual matches
Nanthana Komwong	3–0	Mai Xuan Hang	11 – 7, 11 – 4, 11 – 1
Anisara Muangsuk	3–0	Mai Hoang my Trang	11 – 4, 11 – 7, 11 – 4
Suttilux Rattanaprayoon	2–3	Luong Thi Tam	14 – 16, 12 – 10, 11 – 9, 8 – 11, 6 – 11
Nanthana Komwong	3–1	Mai Hoang my Trang	11 – 8, 11 – 6, 7 – 11, 11 – 8

3 December 2007; 13:00	Philippines	1–3	Indonesia

Report	Individual matches
Sendrina Andrea Balatbat	1–3	Ceria Nilasari Jusma	5 – 11, 11 – 8, 9 – 11, 9 – 11
Crisanta Abas	3–1	Christine Ferliana	11 – 5, 11 – 8, 8 – 11, 11 – 8
Ian Lariba	0–3	Nuni Sugiani	8 – 11, 1 – 11, 4 – 11
Sendrina Andrea Balatbat	0–3	Christine Ferliana	4 – 11, 9 – 11, 8 – 11

3 December 2007; 16:00	Thailand	3–0	Indonesia

Report	Individual matches
Nanthana Komwong	3–1	Christine Ferliana	7 – 11, 11 – 4, 11 – 5, 11 – 7
Anisara Muangsuk	3–0	Ceria Nilasari Jusma	11 – 3, 11 – 6, 11 – 8
Suttilux Rattanaprayoon	3–0	Nuni Sugiani	11 – 5, 11 – 9, 11 – 3

3 December 2007; 16:00	Vietnam	3–0	Philippines

Report	Individual matches
Mai Hoang my Trang	3–0	Crisanta Abas	11 – 1, 11 – 1, 11 – 8
Mai Xuan Hang	3–0	Sendrina Andrea Balatbat	11 – 7, 11 – 4, 11 – 3
Luong Thi Tam	3–0	Ian Lariba	11 – 3, 11 – 8, 11 – 7

4 December 2007; 14:00	Indonesia	1–3	Vietnam

Report	Individual matches
Ceria Nilasari Jusma	3–1	Mai Hoang my Trang	14 – 12, 13 – 11, 4 – 11, 11 – 7
Christine Ferliana	0–3	Mai Xuan Hang	12 – 14, 7 – 11, 7 – 11
Nuni Sugiani	0–3	Pham Thi Thien Kim	9 – 11, 8 – 11, 7 – 11
Christine Ferliana	2–3	Mai Hoang my Trang	12 – 10, 2 – 11, 11 – 8, 9 – 11, 7 – 11

4 December 2007; 14:00	Thailand	3–0	Philippines

Report	Individual matches
Nanthana Komwong	3–0	Sendrina Andrea Balatbat	11 – 5, 11 – 8, 11 – 1
Anisara Muangsuk	3–0	Crisanta Abas	11 – 1, 11 – 0, 11 – 7
Priyakan Triampo	3–1	Ian Lariba	11 – 7, 12 – 10, 8 – 11, 11 – 6

=== Knockout round ===
Semifinals; 5 December 10:00
Singapore	3
Vietnam	0
Malaysia	2
Thailand	3

Gold medal match 5 December 15:00
Singapore	3
Thailand	0

==== Semifinals ====
5 December 2007; 10:00	Singapore	3–0	Vietnam

Report	Individual matches
Wang Yuegu	3–0	Mai Hoang my Trang	12 – 10, 11 – 8, 11 – 6
Li Jiawei	3–0	Mai Xuan Hang	11 – 7, 11 – 6, 11 – 8
Sun Beibei	3–0	Luong Thi Tam	11 – 5, 11 – 8, 11 – 6

5 December 2007; 10:00	Malaysia	2–3	Thailand

Report	Individual matches
Chiu Soo Jiin	0–3	Nanthana Komwong	5 – 11, 7 – 11, 7 – 11
Beh Lee Wei	3–2	Anisara Muangsuk	11 – 7, 11 – 13, 12 – 14, 11 – 8, 11 – 5
Ng Sock Khim	3–2	Suttilux Rattanaprayoon	14 – 12, 11 – 9, 7 – 11, 7 – 11, 12 – 10
Beh Lee Wei	1–3	Nanthana Komwong	11 – 9, 12 – 14, 9 – 11, 9 – 11
Chiu Soo Jiin	0–3	Anisara Muangsuk	7 – 11, 5 – 11, 5 – 11

==== Gold medal match ====
5 December 2007; 15:00	Singapore	3–0	Thailand

Report	Individual matches
Wang Yuegu	3–1	Nanthana Komwong	11 – 6, 11 – 7, 9 – 11, 11 – 6
Li Jiawei	3–0	Anisara Muangsuk	11 – 5, 11 – 6, 11 – 8
Sun Beibei	3–1	Suttilux Rattanaprayoon	11 – 7, 11 – 3, 14 – 16, 11 – 6

Preceded by 2005	Table tennis at the SEA Games; 2007 SEA Games	Succeeded by 2009
