= Table tennis at the 2009 SEA Games – Women's singles =

Table tennis – Women's singles at the 2009 SEA Games
- Venue: Convention Hall, National University
- Dates: 8 – 15 December 2009
- Competitors: 16 from 8 nations

Medalists
gold medal	Feng Tianwei	Singapore
silver medal	Wang Yuegu	Singapore
bronze medal	Beh Lee Wei	Malaysia
bronze medal	Nanthana Komwong	Thailand

The women's singles competition of the table tennis event at the 2009 SEA Games was held from 8 to 15 December at the Convention Hall, National University of Laos in Vientiane, Laos.

== Participating nations ==
A total of 16 athletes from eight nations competed in women's singles table tennis at the 2009 Southeast Asian Games:

- Indonesia (2)
- Laos (2)
- Malaysia (2)
- Myanmar (2)
- Philippines (2)
- Singapore (2)
- Thailand (2)
- Vietnam (2)

== Schedule ==
All times are Laos Time (UTC+07:00).

== Results ==
=== Women's singles ===
==== Group round ====
===== Group A =====
Team	Pld	W	L	GW	GL	Pts
(Singapore) Wang Yuegu	3	3	0	9	0	6
(Myanmar) Khin Khin Win	3	2	1	6	4	5
(Indonesia) Ceria Nilsari Jusma	3	1	2	4	6	4
(Laos) Seangdavanh Duangpanya	3	0	3	0	9	3

===== Group B =====
Team	Pld	W	L	GW	GL	Pts
(Thailand) Nanthana Komwong	3	3	0	9	1	6
(Malaysia) Chiu Soo Jiin	3	2	1	7	4	5
(Laos) Seangdavieng Douangpanya	3	1	2	3	6	4
(Philippines) Beverly Villar	3	0	3	1	9	3

===== Group C =====
Team	Pld	W	L	GW	GL	Pts
(Malaysia) Beh Lee Wei	3	3	0	9	0	6
(Myanmar) Naw Norend	3	2	1	6	5	5
(Thailand) Anisara Muangsuk	3	1	2	3	7	4
(Vietnam) Mai Xuan Hang	3	0	3	3	9	3

===== Group D =====
Team	Pld	W	L	GW	GL	Pts
(Singapore) Feng Tianwei	3	3	0	9	0	6
(Vietnam) Mai Hoang My Trang	3	2	1	6	4	5
(Indonesia) Silir Rovani	3	1	2	4	6	4
(Philippines) Chrisma Capistrano	3	0	3	0	9	3

==== Elimination rounds ====
Semi-finals
(Singapore) Wang Yuegu	11	11	11	11
(Malaysia) Beh Lee Wei	6	4	3	6
(Singapore) Feng Tianwei	11	11	11	11
(Thailand) Nanthana Komwong	5	9	6	5

Final
(Singapore) Wang Yuegu	6	10	9	12	6
(Singapore) Feng Tianwei	11	12	11	10	11
