= Liu Guodong =

Chinese table tennis player

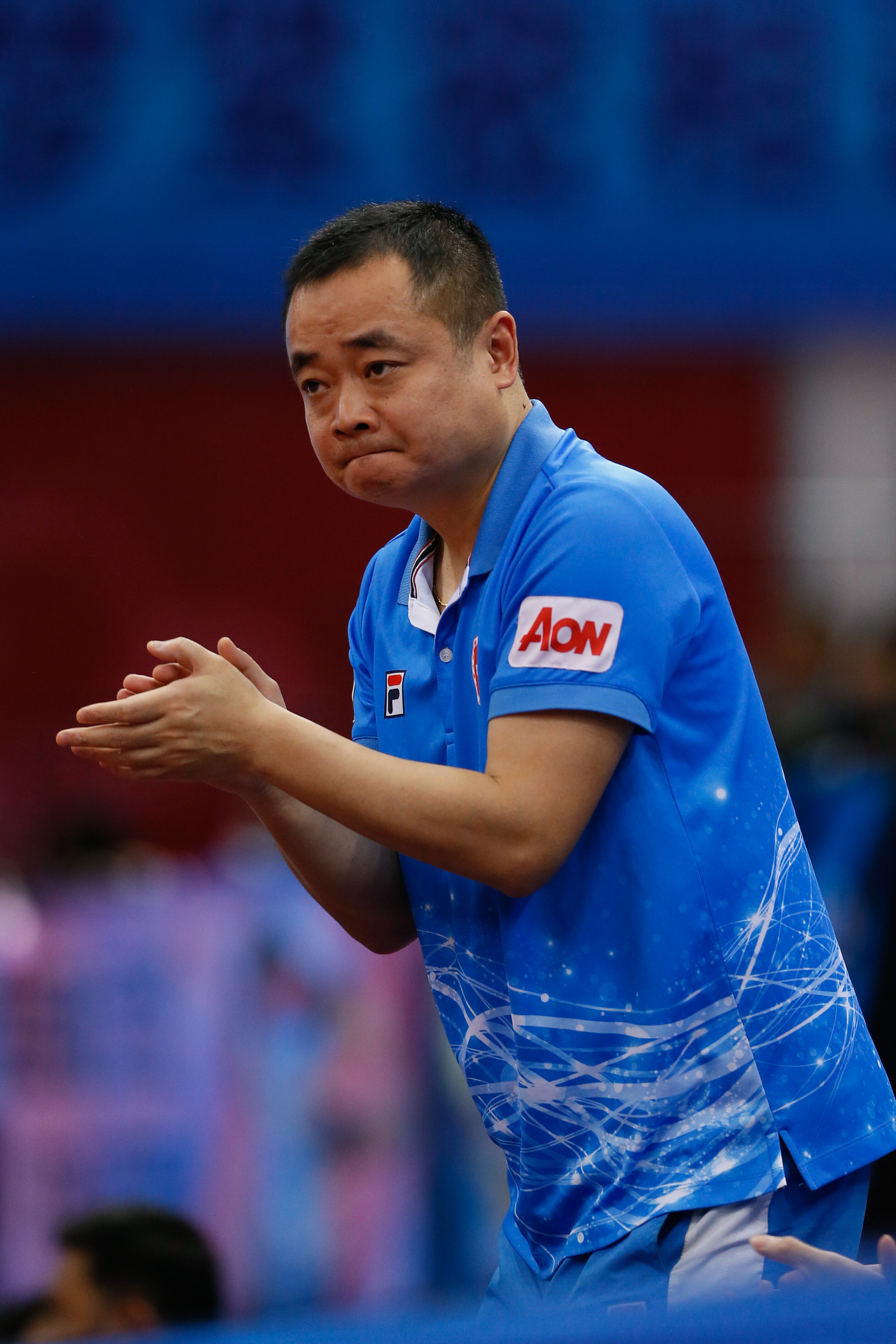
Liu Guodong at the 2017 Asian Table Tennis Championships

Liu Guodong (born April 29, 1974) is a Chinese table tennis coach, currently working for the Hong Kong Table Tennis Association. Under his coaching, the Singapore women's table tennis team gained a silver medal at the 2008 Beijing Olympics.

== Career ==
His coaching career began in Mexico, where he served as an apprentice coach of China's national team, under his younger brother Liu Guoliang. He was appointed by the Singapore Table Tennis Association in 2006.

At the 2008 Beijing Olympics, he coached the women's team, consisting of Feng Tianwei, Li Jiawei and Wang Yuegu. The team won a silver medal, being beaten in the final by China.

In October 2008, he turned down the offer of a renewed contract with the Singapore Table Tennis Association, describing the proposed salary as 'insulting'. Instead, he signed a contract with the Indonesian Table Tennis Federation.
