= Table tennis at the 2017 SEA Games – Men's team =

Table tennis – Men's team at the 2017 SEA Games
- Venue: MiTEC Hall 7
- Dates: 24–26 August 2017
- Competitors: 42 from 9 nations

Medalists
gold medal	Vietnam (VIE)
silver medal	Singapore (SGP)
bronze medal	Indonesia (INA)
bronze medal	Malaysia (MAS)

The men's team competition of the table tennis event at the 2017 SEA Games will be held from 24 to 26 August at the MiTEC Hall 7 in Kuala Lumpur, Malaysia.

== Schedule ==
All times are Malaysian Time (UTC+08:00).

Date	Time	Round
Thursday, 24 August 2017	9:00	Preliminaries
Friday, 25 August 2017	11:00	Preliminaries
Saturday, 26 August 2017	10:00	Semifinals
Saturday, 26 August 2017	19:00	Finals

== Results ==
=== Preliminary round ===
Source: Results (Groups) - Men's Team

==== Group A ====
Team	Pld	W	L	MF	MA	GF	GA	F-A	Pts
Singapore (SGP)	4	4	0	12	0	27	4	431:250	8
Malaysia (MAS)	4	3	1	9	4	30	15	444:369	7
Philippines (PHI)	4	2	2	7	6	23	19	384:354	6
Myanmar (MYA)	4	1	3	3	9	12	27	325:376	5
Laos (LAO)	4	0	4	0	12	0	36	166:396	4

24 August 2017; 9:00	Malaysia	3–0	Myanmar

Report	Individual matches
Muhd Shakirin Bin Ibrahim	3–0	Soe Min Oo	17 – 15, 11 – 8, 11 – 3
Leong Chee Feng	3–1	Thet Ko Ko Latt	7 – 11, 11 – 8, 11 – 8, 11 – 7
Muhamad Ashraf Haiqal bin Muhamad Rizal / Leong Chee Feng	3–0	Soe Min Oo / Kyi Myint	11 – 7, 11 – 4, 11 – 9

24 August 2017; 9:00	Philippines	3–0	Laos

Report	Individual matches
Richard Gonzales	3–0	Souksavanh Phanouvong	11 – 4, 11 – 4, 11 – 3
Jann Mari Nayre	3–0	Oliyavong Phonepaseud	11 – 5, 11 – 2, 11 – 7
Isaias Seronio / Jann Mari Nayre	3–0	Souksavanh Phanouvong / Mosangsinh Sonepasith	11 – 7, 11 – 2, 11 – 4

24 August 2017; 14:00	Singapore	3–0	Laos

Report	Individual matches
Clarence Chew	3–0	Souksavanh Phanouvong	11 – 5, 11 – 2, 11 – 4
Pang Xue Jie	3–0	Mosangsinh Sonepasith	11 – 5, 11 – 2, 11 – 7
Ethan Poh Shao Feng / Clarence Chew	3–0	Souksavanh Phanouvong / Oliyavong Phonepaseud	11 – 1, 11 – 4, 11 – 5

24 August 2017; 14:00	Philippines	3–0	Myanmar

Report	Individual matches
'Richard Gonzales	3–0	Soe Min Oo	11 – 6, 12 – 10, 11 – 5
Jann Mari Nayre	3–0	Thet Ko Ko Latt	11 – 9, 11 – 8, 11 – 5
Ryan Rodney Jacolo / Jann Mari Nayre	3–0	Thet Ko Ko Latt / Aye Khaing	11 – 4, 11 – 7, 11 – 5

24 August 2017; 19:00	Singapore	3–0	Philippines

Report	Individual matches
Gao Ning	3–0	Jann Mari Nayre	11 – 4, 11 – 7, 11 – 7
Clarence Chew	3–0	Ryan Rodney Jacolo	12 – 10, 11 – 3, 11 – 8
Gao Ning / Pang Xue Jie	3–0	Japheth Adasa / Jann Mari Nayre	11 – 2, 11 – 3, 11 – 8

24 August 2017; 19:00	Malaysia	3–0	Laos

Report	Individual matches
Muhamad Ashraf Haiqal bin Muhamad Rizal	3–0	Mosangsinh Sonepasith	11 – 3, 11 – 4, 11 – 4
Leong Chee Feng	3–0	Souksavanh Phanouvong	11 – 4, 11 – 6, 11 – 2
Leong Chee Feng / Chong Javen	3–0	Vongdalasinh Seng Arthid / Mosangsinh Sonepasith	11 – 4, 11 – 5, 11 – 9

25 August 2017; 11:00	Singapore	3–0	Malaysia

Report	Individual matches
Gao Ning	3–2	Muhamad Ashraf Haiqal bin Muhamad Rizal	11 – 4, 6 – 11, 11 – 4, 10 – 12, 11 – 6
Clarence Chew	3–0	Leong Chee Feng	12 – 10, 11 – 2, 11 – 9
Pang Xue Jie / Gao Ning	3–0	Muhd Shakirin Bin Ibrahim / Muhamad Ashraf Haiqal bin Muhamad Rizal	11 – 8, 11 – 5, 11 – 5

25 August 2017; 11:00	Laos	0–3	Myanmar

Report	Individual matches
Mosangsinh Sonepasith	0–3	Soe Min Oo	4 – 11, 8 – 11, 5 – 11
Vongdalasinh Seng Arthid	0–3	Thet Ko Ko Latt	4 – 11, 6 – 11, 9 – 11
Oliyavong Phonepaseud / Mosangsinh Sonepasith	0–3	Thet Ko Ko Latt / Kyi Myint	5 – 11, 2 – 11, 5 - 11

25 August 2017; 19:00	Singapore	3–0	Myanmar

Report	Individual matches
Ethan Poh Shao Feng	3–2	Kyi Myint	11 – 7, 8 – 11, 9 – 11, 11 – 7, 11 – 8
Pang Xue Jie	3–0	Aye Khaing	11 – 4, 11 – 6, 11 – 9
Clarence Chew / Ethan Poh Shao Feng	3–0	Kyi Myint / Soe Min Oo	11 – 9, 11 – 7, 11 – 8

25 August 2017; 19:00	Malaysia	3–0	Philippines

Report	Individual matches
Leong Chee Feng	3–1	Richard Gonzales	11 – 7, 10 – 12, 14 – 12, 11 – 5
Muhamad Ashraf Haiqal bin Muhamad Rizal	1–3	Jann Mari Nayre	10 – 12, 7 – 11, 9 – 11
Muhamad Ashraf Haiqal bin Muhamad Rizal / Muhd Shakirin Bin Ibrahim	3–1	Ryan Rodney Jacolo / Jann Mari Nayre	20 – 18, 11 – 5, 11 – 8
Muhd Shakirin Bin Ibrahim	3–1	Richard Gonzales	11 – 5, 10 – 12, 11 – 8, 11 – 7

==== Group B ====
Team	Pld	W	L	MF	MA	GF	GA	F-A	Pts
Vietnam (VIE)	3	3	0	9	3	29	17	445:364	6
Indonesia (INA)	3	2	1	7	4	24	19	427:390	5
Thailand (THA)	3	1	2	6	6	25	19	415:392	4
Cambodia (CAM)	3	0	3	0	9	3	18	174:314	3

24 August 2017; 9:00	Vietnam	3–2	Thailand

Report	Individual matches
Nguyen Anh Tu	1–3	Padasak Tanviriyavechakul	11 – 3, 8 – 11, 2 – 11, 7 – 11
Dinh Quang Linh	3–0	Supanut Wisutmaythangkoon	11 – 7, 11 – 4, 11 – 7
Nguyen Anh Tu / Tran Tuan Quynh	3–2	Pattaratorn Passara / Supanut Wisutmaythangkoon	6 – 11, 11 – 7, 7 – 11, 11 – 4, 11 – 6
Tran Tuan Quynh	0–3	Padasak Tanviriyavechakul	8 – 11, 11 – 13, 9 – 11
Dinh Quang Linh	3–0	Pattaratorn Passara	12 – 10, 12 – 10, 11 – 7

24 August 2017; 9:00	Indonesia	3–0	Cambodia

Report	Individual matches
Donny Prasetya Aji	3–1	Lim Sok Long	3 – 11, 11 – 2, 13 – 11, 11 – 7
Ficky Supit Santoso	3–0	Soeung Tola	11 – 6, 11 – 4, 11 – 4
Donny Prasetya Aji / Muhammad Bima Abdi Negara	3–0	Khun Phannith / Lim Sok Long	11 – 6, 11 – 3, 12 – 10

24 August 2017; 14:00	Vietnam	3–1	Indonesia

Report	Individual matches
Dinh Quang Linh	3–1	Donny Prasetya Aji	11 – 5, 11 – 7, 9 – 11, 11 – 9
Nguyen Anh Tu	3–2	Ficky Supit Santoso	8 – 11, 11 – 8, 9 – 11, 12 – 10, 11 – 7
Dinh Quang Linh / Doan Ba Tuan Anh	1–3	Muhammad Bima Abdi Negara / Ficky Supit Santoso	11 – 6, 9 – 11, 9 – 11, 10 – 12
Doan Ba Tuan Anh	3–0	Donny Prasetya Aji	11 – 9, 11 – 8, 11 – 6

24 August 2017; 14:00	Thailand	3–0	Cambodia

Report	Individual matches
Padasak Tanviriyavechakul	3–0	Khun Phannith	11 – 3, 11 – 6, 11 – 1
Nikom Wongsiri	3–0	Samnang Virakboth	11 – 4, 11 – 6, 11 – 7
Pattaratorn Passara / Nikom Wongsiri	3–0	Khun Phannith / Sarak Soupring	11 – 1, 11 – 8, 11 – 7

25 August 2017; 11:00	Vietnam	3–0	Cambodia

Report	Individual matches
Nguyen Anh Tu	3–0	Samnang Virakboth	11 – 7, 11 – 5, 11 – 4
Doan Ba Tuan Anh	3–0	Sarak Soupring	11 – 2, 11 – 6, 11 – 5
Nguyen Anh Tu / Tran Tuan Quynh	3–2	Soeung Tola / Sarak Soupring	5 – 11, 6 – 11, 11 – 9, 11 – 3, 11 – 4

25 August 2017; 11:00	Indonesia	3–1	Thailand

Report	Individual matches
Muhammad Bima Abdi Negara	0–3	Padasak Tanviriyavechakul	9 – 11, 7 – 11, 12 – 14
Ficky Supit Santoso	3–1	Pattaratorn Passara	12 – 10, 8 – 11, 11 – 7, 11 – 4
Donny Prasetya Aji / Muhammad Bima Abdi Negara	3–2	Pattaratorn Passara / Nikom Wongsiri	11 – 7, 15 – 17, 8 – 11, 12 – 10, 12 – 10
Ficky Supit Santoso	3–2	Nikom Wongsiri	11 – 7, 11 – 6, 10 – 12, 9 – 11, 11 – 2

=== Knockout round ===
Source: Results - Men's Team

Semifinals; 26 August 10:00
Singapore	3
Indonesia	0
Malaysia	0
Vietnam	3

Gold medal match 26 August 19:00
Singapore	1
Vietnam	3

==== Semifinals ====
26 August 2017; 10:00	Singapore	3–0	Indonesia

Report	Individual matches
Clarence Chew	3–0	Donny Prasetya Aji	11 – 9, 11 – 5, 11 – 8
Gao Ning	3–0	Ficky Supit Santoso	14 – 12, 11 – 7, 11 – 9
Pang Xue Jie / Gao Ning	3–2	Ficky Supit Santoso / Muhammad Bima Abdi Negara	11 – 6, 6 – 11, 11 – 5, 4 – 11, 11 – 5

26 August 2017; 10:00	Malaysia	0–3	Vietnam

Report	Individual matches
Leong Chee Feng	0–3	Dinh Quang Linh	9 – 11, 5 – 11, 8 – 11
Muhamad Ashraf Haiqal bin Muhamad Rizal	0–3	Nguyen Anh Tu	8 – 11, 4 – 11, 10 – 12
Leong Chee Feng / Muhd Shakirin Bin Ibrahim	0–3	Doan Ba Tuan Anh / Dinh Quang Linh	9 – 11, 11 – 13, 8 – 11

==== Gold medal match ====
26 August 2017; 19:00	Singapore	1–3	Vietnam

Report	Individual matches
Gao Ning	3–1	Dinh Quang Linh	10 – 12, 11 – 0, 11 – 9, 11 – 2
Clarence Chew	1–3	Nguyen Anh Tu	4 – 11, 11 – 6, 9 – 11, 10 – 12
Gao Ning / Pang Xue Jie	2–3	Doan Ba Tuan Anh / Dinh Quang Linh	8 – 11, 11 – 4, 14 – 12, 8 – 11, 9 – 11
Pang Xue Jie	0–3	Nguyen Anh Tu	11 – 13, 9 – 11, 3 – 11
