= Table tennis at the 2001 SEA Games =

Table Tennis at the 2001 SEA Games
- Venue: TNB Pantai Kilat Hall, Kuala Lumpur
- Dates: 9–16 September 2001

Table Tennis at the 2001 SEA Games was held in TNB Pantai Kilat Hall, Kuala Lumpur, Malaysia from 9 to 16 September 2001 Tennis had team, doubles, and singles events for men and women, as well as a mixed doubles competition.

== Medalists ==
Event	Gold	Silver	Bronze
Men's team	Thailand (THA); Phakphoom Sanguansin; Phuchong Sanguansin; Chaisit Chaitat; Sanan Ariyachotima	Singapore (SIN); Zhang Tai Yong; Duan Yong Jun; Cai Xiao Li; Raymond Sen Yew Fai	Malaysia (MAS); Tan Chin; Chan Koon Wah; Jong Min Shing; Oh Chor Sime
Men's team	Thailand (THA); Phakphoom Sanguansin; Phuchong Sanguansin; Chaisit Chaitat; Sanan Ariyachotima	Singapore (SIN); Zhang Tai Yong; Duan Yong Jun; Cai Xiao Li; Raymond Sen Yew Fai	Vietnam (VIE); Vu Manh Cuong; Doan Kien Quoc; Tran Tuan Quynh; Doan Trong Nghia
Women's team	Singapore (SIN); Zhang Xue Ling; Li Jia Wei; Tan Paey Fern; Jing Jun Hong	Thailand (THA); Anisara Muangsuk; Nanthana Komwong; Pornsri Ariyachotima; Tidaporn Vongboon	Malaysia (MAS); Beh Lee Wei; Beh Lee Fong; Ng Sock Khim
Women's team	Singapore (SIN); Zhang Xue Ling; Li Jia Wei; Tan Paey Fern; Jing Jun Hong	Thailand (THA); Anisara Muangsuk; Nanthana Komwong; Pornsri Ariyachotima; Tidaporn Vongboon	Vietnam (VIE); Tran Le Phuong Linh; Nguyen Mai Thy; Luong Thi Tam; Ngo Thu Thuy
Men's singles	Vu Manh Cuong; Vietnam	Ismu Harinto; Indonesia	Duan Yong Jun; Singapore
Men's singles	Vu Manh Cuong; Vietnam	Ismu Harinto; Indonesia	Doan Kien Quoc; Vietnam
Women's singles	Li Jia Wei; Singapore	Nanthana Komwong; Thailand	Anisara Muangsuk; Thailand
Women's singles	Li Jia Wei; Singapore	Nanthana Komwong; Thailand	Jing Jun Hong; Singapore
Men's doubles	Singapore (SIN); Duan Yong Jun; Zhang Tai Yong	Singapore (SIN); Raymond Sen Yew Fai; Cai Xiao Li	Thailand (THA); Phakphoom Sanguansin; Phuchong Sanguansin
Men's doubles	Singapore (SIN); Duan Yong Jun; Zhang Tai Yong	Singapore (SIN); Raymond Sen Yew Fai; Cai Xiao Li	Indonesia (INA); Ismu Harinto; Dian David Mickael Jacobs
Women's doubles	Singapore (SIN); Jing Jun Hong; Li Jia Wei	Indonesia (INA); Fauziah Yulianti; Putri Septi Naulina Hasibuan	Indonesia (INA); Rossy Pratiwi Dipoyanti; Christine Ferliana
Women's doubles	Singapore (SIN); Jing Jun Hong; Li Jia Wei	Indonesia (INA); Fauziah Yulianti; Putri Septi Naulina Hasibuan	Malaysia (MAS); Beh Lee Wei; Beh Lee Fong
Mixed doubles	Singapore (SIN); Zhang Tai Yong; Jing Jun Hong	Thailand (THA); Phakphoom Sanguansin; Nanthana Komwong	Vietnam (VIE); Vu Manh Cuong; Ngo Thu Thuy
Mixed doubles	Singapore (SIN); Zhang Tai Yong; Jing Jun Hong	Thailand (THA); Phakphoom Sanguansin; Nanthana Komwong	Singapore (SIN); Duan Yong Jun; Li Jia Wei

== Medal table ==
Legend

* Host nation (Malaysia)

Rank	Nation	Gold	Silver	Bronze	Total
1	Singapore (SIN)	5	2	3	10
2	Thailand (THA)	1	3	2	6
3	Vietnam (VIE)	1	0	4	5
4	Indonesia (INA)	0	2	2	4
5	Malaysia (MAS)*	0	0	3	3
Totals (5 entries)		7	7	14	28
