= Table tennis at the 2017 SEA Games – Men's doubles =

Table tennis – Men's doubles at the 2017 SEA Games
- Venue: MiTEC Hall 7
- Dates: 20 August 2017
- Competitors: 36 from 9 nations

Medalists
gold medal	Gao Ning; Pang Xue Jie	Singapore
silver medal	Clarence Chew; Ethan Poh Shao Feng	Singapore
bronze medal	Ficky Supit Santoso; M. Bima Abdi Negara	Indonesia
bronze medal	Padasak Tanviriyavechakul; Supanut Wisutmaythangkoon	Thailand

The men's doubles competition of the table tennis event at the 2017 SEA Games was held 20 August at MiTEC Hall 7 in Kuala Lumpur, Malaysia.

== Format ==
=== Doubles Events ===
(i) All Doubles events (Men’s, Women’s and Mixed) shall be played in a single knockout competition format. All matches shall be decided by best-of-five (5) games.

(ii) There will be no playoff match for 3rd and 4th positions. Both losing Semi-Finalists will receive a joint bronze medal each.

== Schedule ==
All times are Malaysian Time (UTC+08:00).

Date	Time	Round
Sunday, 20 August 2017	15:00	Round of 32
Sunday, 20 August 2017	15:30	Round of 16
Sunday, 20 August 2017	17:00	Quarterfinals
Sunday, 20 August 2017	19:30	Semifinals
Sunday, 20 August 2017	20:30	Final

== Results ==
Source: Event Summary

Round of 32; 15:00
(Thailand) N Wongsiri (Thailand) P Passara	11	6	11	11	3
(Philippines) J Adasa (Philippines) RR Jacolo	6	11	5	9	1
(Myanmar) Kyi M (Myanmar) Soe MO	11	12	11	11	3
(Cambodia) Khun P (Cambodia) Sarak S	4	14	6	6	1

Round of 16; 15:30
(Vietnam) Nguyen AT (Vietnam) Tran TQ	11	11	11	3
(Laos) M Sonepasith (Laos) S Phanouvong	7	3	2	0
(Cambodia) Samnang V (Cambodia) Soeung T	6	4	5	0
(Indonesia) FS Santoso (Indonesia) MBA Negara	11	11	11	3
(Malaysia) MAHM Rizal (Malaysia) MS Ibrahim	10	12	9	11	6	2
(Thailand) N Wongsiri (Thailand) P Passara	12	10	11	9	11	3
(Myanmar) Aye K (Myanmar) Thet KKL	5	7	4	0
(Singapore) Chew ZYC (Singapore) Poh SFE	11	11	11	3
(Thailand) P Tanviriyavechakul (Thailand) S Wisutmaythangkoon	11	11	13	3
(Laos) P Oliyavong (Laos) VS Arthid	5	6	11	0
(Myanmar) Kyi M (Myanmar) Soe MO	11	11	5	11	3
(Malaysia) J Choong (Malaysia) Leong CF	8	9	11	9	1
(Philippines) R Gonzales (Philippines) JM Nayre	8	10	11	8	1
(Vietnam) Doan BTA (Vietnam) Nguyen DT	11	12	9	11	3
(Indonesia) DP Aji (Indonesia) H Wahid	8	10	12	4	1
(Singapore) Gao N (Singapore) Pang XJ	11	12	10	11	3

Quarterfinals; 17:00
(Vietnam) Nguyen AT (Vietnam) Tran TQ	8	9	15	1	1
(Indonesia) FS Santoso (Indonesia) MBA Negara	11	11	13	11	3
(Thailand) N Wongsiri (Thailand) P Passara	9	11	7	0
(Singapore) Chew ZYC (Singapore) Poh SFE	11	13	11	3
(Thailand) P Tanviriyavechakul (Thailand) S Wisutmaythangkoon	12	9	11	11	3
(Myanmar) Kyi M (Myanmar) Soe MO	10	11	9	7	1
(Vietnam) Doan BTA (Vietnam) Nguyen DT	11	5	2	0
(Singapore) Gao N (Singapore) Pang XJ	13	11	11	3

Semifinals; 19:30
(Indonesia) FS Santoso (Indonesia) MBA Negara	12	11	7	15	1
(Singapore) Chew ZYC (Singapore) Poh SFE	14	4	11	17	3
(Thailand) P Tanviriyavechakul (Thailand) S Wisutmaythangkoon	9	12	8	0
(Singapore) Gao N (Singapore) Pang XJ	11	14	11	3

Finals; 20:30
(Singapore) Chew ZYC (Singapore) Poh SFE	4	9	11	6	1
(Singapore) Gao N (Singapore) Pang XJ	11	11	7	11	3
