= Table tennis at the 2010 Commonwealth Games – Women's team =

The Women's team competition began on 4 October 2010. There were a total of 16 teams.

== Preliminaries ==
=== Group 1 ===
Team	Pts	Pld	W	L	GW	GL
Singapore	6	3	3	0	9	0
Canada	5	3	2	1	6	4
Guernsey	4	3	1	2	4	6
Tanzania	3	3	0	3	0	9

4 October

Singapore	3–0	Guernsey
Canada	3–0	Tanzania
Singapore	3–0	Canada
Guernsey	3–0	Tanzania

5 October

Canada	3–1	Guernsey
Singapore	3–0	Tanzania

=== Group 2 ===
Team	Pts	Pld	W	L	GW	GL
England	6	3	3	0	9	2
Nigeria	5	3	2	1	6	4
Northern Ireland	4	3	1	2	6	6
Maldives	3	3	0	3	0	9

4 October

England	3–2	Northern Ireland
Nigeria	3–0	Maldives
England	3–0	Nigeria
Northern Ireland	3–0	Maldives

5 October

Nigeria	3–1	Northern Ireland
England	3–0	Maldives

=== Group 3 ===
Team	Pts	Pld	W	L	GW	GL
Australia	6	3	3	0	9	1
Malaysia	5	3	2	1	7	3
Wales	4	3	1	2	3	7
Vanuatu	3	3	0	3	1	9

4 October

Australia	3–0	Wales
Malaysia	3–0	Vanuatu
Australia	3–1	Malaysia
Wales	3–1	Vanuatu

5 October

Malaysia	3–0	Wales
Australia	3–0	Vanuatu

=== Group 4 ===
Team	Pts	Pld	W	L	GW	GL
New Zealand	6	3	3	0	9	2
India	5	3	2	1	8	3
Sri Lanka	4	3	1	2	3	9
Ghana	3	3	0	3	0	9

4 October

India	3–0	Sri Lanka
New Zealand	3–0	Ghana
New Zealand	3–2	India
Sri Lanka	3–0	Ghana

5 October

India	3–0	Ghana
New Zealand	3–0	Sri Lanka

== Elimination rounds ==
Quarterfinals; 6 October
Singapore	3
Nigeria	0
New Zealand	2
Malaysia	3
India	3
Australia	1
Canada	1
England	3

Semifinals; 7 October
Singapore	3
Malaysia	0
India	3
England	0

Finals; 8 October
Singapore	3
India	0
Third place
Malaysia	3
England	2

== See also ==
- 2010 Commonwealth Games
- Table tennis at the 2010 Commonwealth Games
