= Beh Lee Wei =

Malaysian table tennis player (born 1983)

Personal information
- Native name: 马莉薇
- Born: April 12, 1983 (age 43) Kedah, Malaysia
- Height: 1.68 m (5 ft 6 in)
- Weight: 85 kg (187 lb; 13.4 st)

Sport
- Sport: Table tennis
- Playing style: Right-hand shakehand grip
Medal record
Women's Table Tennis
Representing Malaysia
Commonwealth Games
| Bronze medal – third place | 2010 Delhi | Team |
| Bronze medal – third place | 2014 Glasgow | Team |
Southeast Asian Games
| Bronze medal – third place | 2001 Kuala Lumpur | Doubles |
| Bronze medal – third place | 2001 Kuala Lumpur | Team |
| Bronze medal – third place | 2003 Vietnam | Singles |
| Bronze medal – third place | 2005 Manila | Mixed doubles |
| Bronze medal – third place | 2007 Nakhon Ratchasima | Team |
| Bronze medal – third place | 2009 Vientiane | Singles |
| Bronze medal – third place | 2009 Vientiane | Doubles |
| Bronze medal – third place | 2009 Vientiane | Mixed doubles |
| Bronze medal – third place | 2009 Vientiane | Team |
| Bronze medal – third place | 2013 Naypyitaw | Singles |
| Bronze medal – third place | 2013 Naypyitaw | Team |

Beh Lee Wei (simplified Chinese: 马莉薇; traditional Chinese: 馬莉薇; pinyin: Mǎ Lìwēi; Pe̍h-ōe-jī: Bé Lībî) (born 12 April 1983) is a Malaysian table tennis player. Her highest career ITTF ranking was 110. She then served as the coach of the national team until 2019, and then was named to the position again in 2021. She has two children.
