= Muhammad Ahmad Hussein =

Grand Mufti of Jerusalem (2006–present)

Grand Mufti Muhammad Ahmad Hussein
- محمد أحمد حسين
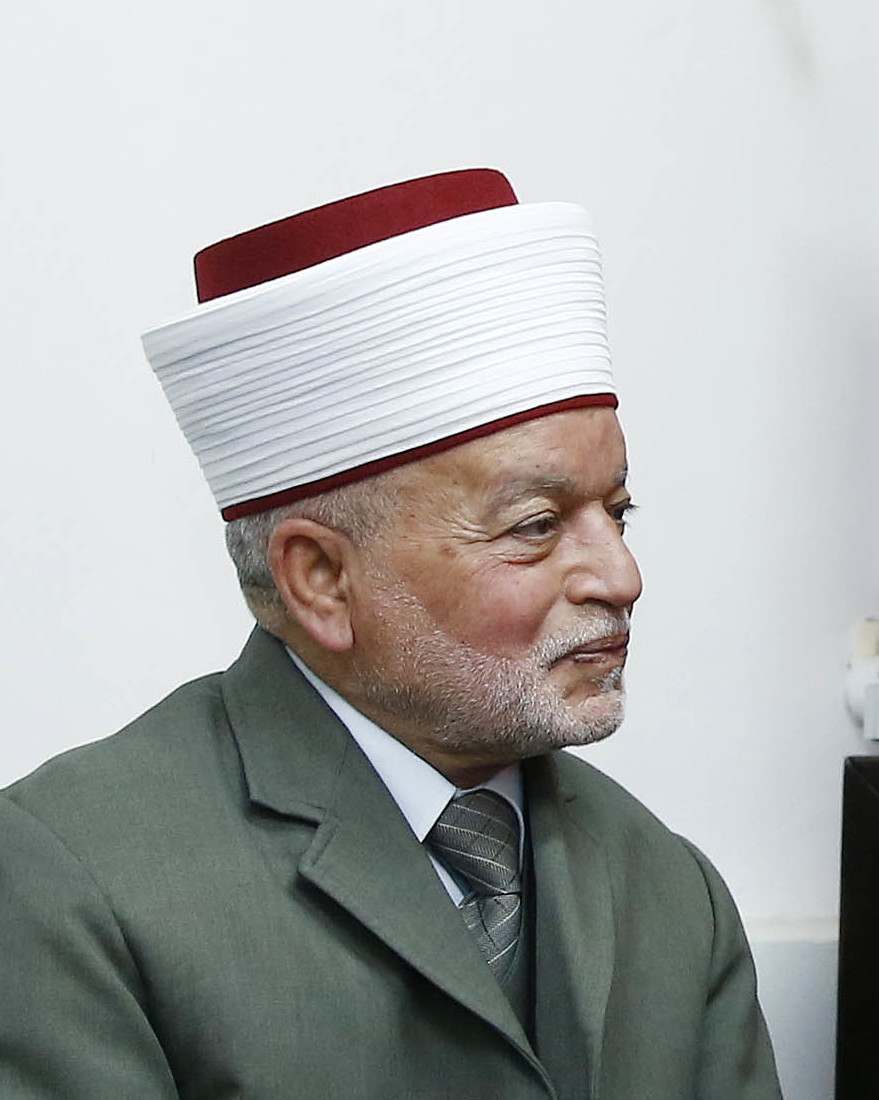
- Hussein in 2014

Personal life
- Born: 1966 (age 59–60) East Jerusalem, Jordanian-annexed West Bank

Religious life
- Religion: Sunni Islam

Senior posting
- Post: Grand Mufti of Jerusalem
- Period in office: July 2006–present
- Predecessor: Ekrima Sa'id Sabri

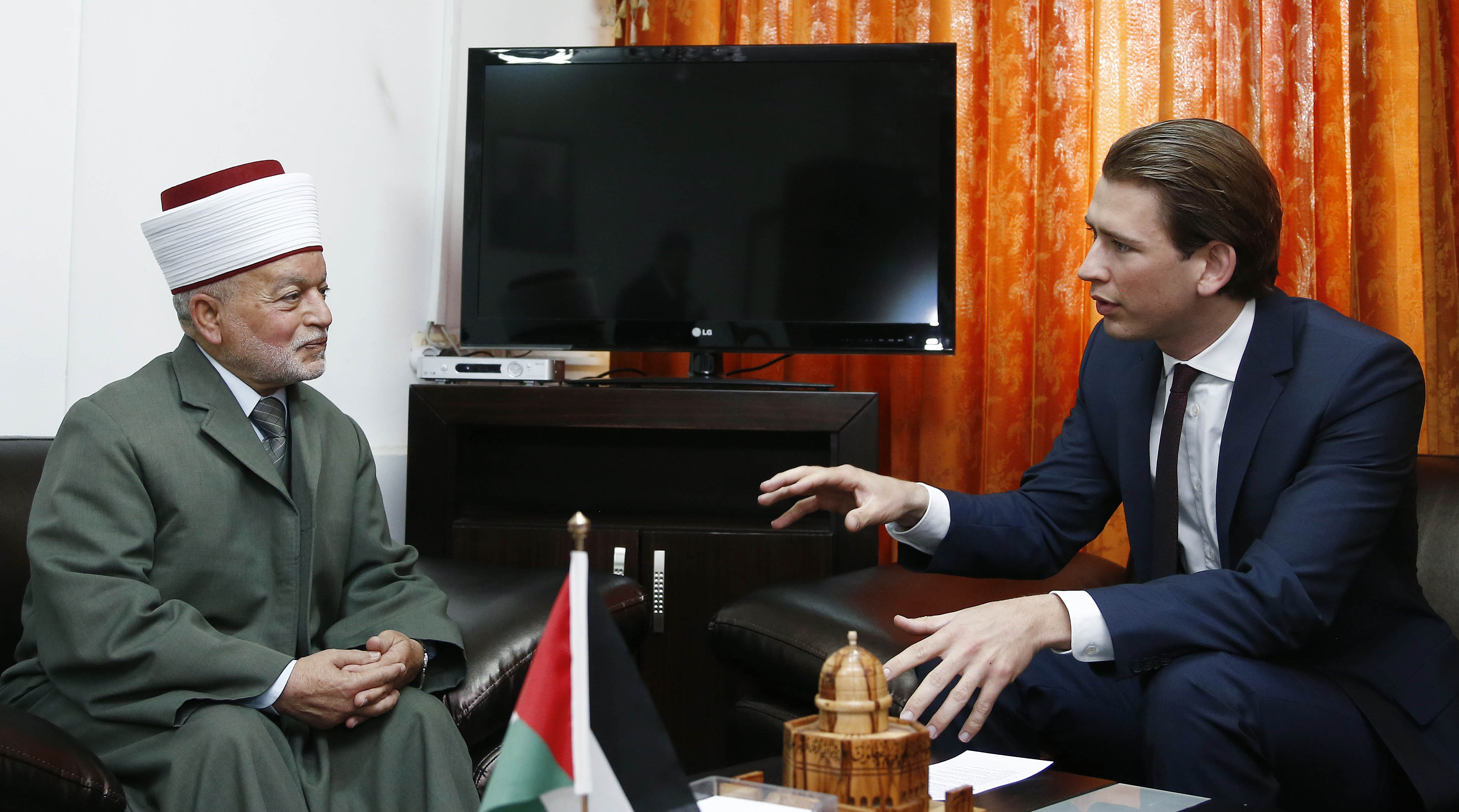
Hussein during a meeting with Austrian foreign minister Sebastian Kurz in April 2014

Muhammad Ahmad Hussein (Arabic: محمد أحمد حسين; born 1966) is the incumbent Grand Mufti of Jerusalem. He was appointed in July 2006 by Mahmoud Abbas, the President of the Palestinian National Authority.

Abbas raised Hussein as an immediate successor to Ekrima Sa'id Sabri, who was reportedly removed from the position due to his growing popularity amidst his open expressions of highly contentious political views and his condoning of violence in the Israeli–Palestinian conflict.

== Appointment as Grand Mufti ==
Prior to his selection for the position, Hussein was the imam and custodian of Al-Aqsa. He was appointed as the Grand Mufti of Jerusalem by Mahmoud Abbas to replace Ekrima Sa'id Sabri, reportedly under the expectation that Hussein would avoid controversy and self-aggrandizement in contrast to the more militant attitude of Sabri.

== Controversy ==
=== Israeli–Palestinian conflict ===
In October 2006, three months after his appointment as the Grand Mufti of Jerusalem, Hussein expressed his opinion on Palestinian suicide bombings against Israelis, stating: "It is legitimate, of course, as long as it plays a role in the resistance."

In January 2012, Hussein addressed a crowd during an anniversary event for the founding of the Palestinian nationalist political party Fatah, during which he quoted a hadith, stating: "The Hour will not come until you fight the Jews. The Jews will hide behind stones or trees. Then the stones or trees will call: O Muslim, servant of Allah, there is a Jew behind me, come and kill him."

Hussein's comments were broadcast on Palestinian television on the same day and then disseminated more widely on January 15 by Palestinian Media Watch, an Israeli media watchdog group. Israeli prime minister Benjamin Netanyahu condemned Hussein's words as "morally heinous" and compared his behaviour to a former Grand Mufti of Jerusalem, Amin al-Husseini, who had allied himself with Adolf Hitler. Israeli attorney-general Yehuda Weinstein instructed local police to open a criminal investigation into Hussein's statements for incitement.

On 8 May 2013, Hussein was detained by Israeli authorities over his alleged connection to riots on the Temple Mount.

In an interview with Israeli television's Channel 2 on 25 October 2015, Hussein denied the existence of any Jewish places of worship on the Temple Mount. He further claimed that the Temple Mount was the site of a mosque "3,000 years ago, and 30,000 years ago" and had been so "since the creation of the world." Regarding the age of Al-Aqsa Mosque, Hussein asserted that "this is the Al-Aqsa Mosque that Adam, peace be upon him, or during his time, the angels built."

=== Statements on women ===
Hussein has expressed the view that women must be accompanied by a male relative while travelling, generating backlash from various media outlets. He has also asserted on religious programs that a woman cannot refuse sexual advances by her husband, stating: "It is his right... This woman may not and has no rights to deny him this right, especially during the permissible time, which is night time."
