= Wang Yuegu =

Singaporean table tennis player

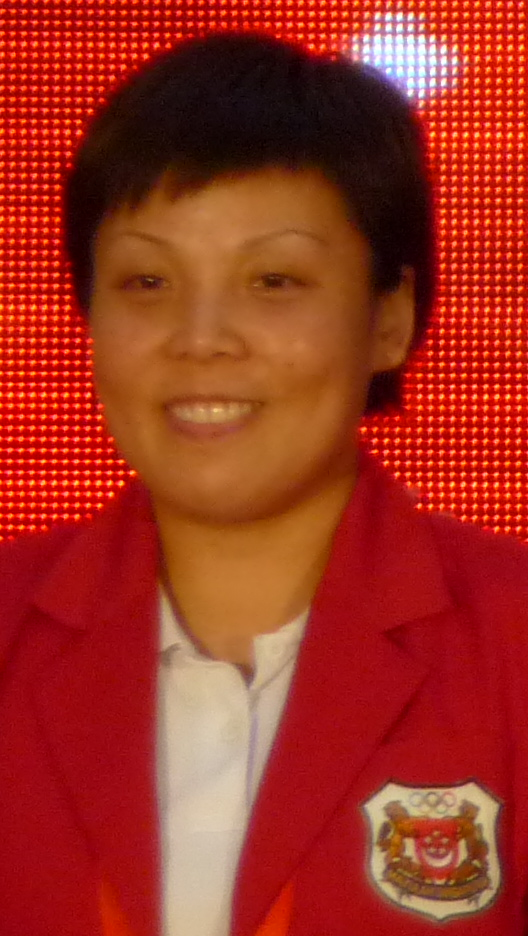
- At a ceremony to welcome Team Singapore home from the 2008 Summer Olympics in Beijing, 25 August 2008

Personal information
- Full name: Wang Yuegu
- Nationality: Singapore
- Born: 10 June 1980 (age 46) Anshan, Liaoning
- Height: 1.55 m (5 ft 1 in)
- Weight: 63 kg (139 lb) (2008)

Sport
- Sport: Table tennis
- Playing style: Right-handed shakehand grip
- Equipment: Nittaku blade
- Highest ranking: 5th (October 2010)
Medal record
Women's table tennis
Representing Singapore
Olympic Games
Silver medal – second place	2008 Beijing	Team
Bronze medal – third place	2012 London	Team
World Championships
Gold medal – first place	2010 Moscow	Team
Silver medal – second place	2008 Guangzhou	Team
Silver medal – second place	2012 Dortmund	Team
Bronze medal – third place	2007 Zagreb	Doubles
Asian Games
Silver medal – second place	2010 Guangzhou	Team
Asian Championships
Silver medal – second place	2007 Yangzhou	Team
Silver medal – second place	2009 Lucknow	Team
Bronze medal – third place	2009 Lucknow	Doubles
Commonwealth Games
Gold medal – first place	2010 Delhi	Mixed doubles
Gold medal – first place	2010 Delhi	Team
Commonwealth Table Tennis Championships
Gold medal – first place	2007 Jaipur	Team
Gold medal – first place	2007 Jaipur	Doubles
Gold medal – first place	2007 Jaipur	Mixed doubles
Gold medal – first place	2009 Glasgow	Singles
Gold medal – first place	2009 Glasgow	Mixed doubles
ITTF Pro Tour
Gold medal – first place	2006 Yokohama	Singles
Gold medal – first place	2006 Bayreuth	Singles
Gold medal – first place	2008 Berlin	Team
Gold medal – first place	2008 Belo Horizonte	Singles
Gold medal – first place	2010 Kobe	Singles
Silver medal – second place	2005 Taipei	Doubles
Silver medal – second place	2008 Warsaw	Singles
Southeast Asian Games
Gold medal – first place	2009 Vientiane	Mixed doubles
Gold medal – first place	2009 Vientiane	Team
Silver medal – second place	2009 Vientiane	Singles
Silver medal – second place	2009 Vientiane	Doubles

Wang Yuegu (Chinese: 王越古; pinyin: Wáng Yuègǔ, pronounced [wǎŋ ɥêkù]; born 10 June 1980) is a retired Chinese-born Singaporean table tennis player who was ranked among the top ten players in the world. Wang made her inaugural appearance as a Singaporean table tennis player on the International Table Tennis Federation (ITTF) Pro Tour in June 2005 at the Volkswagen Korean Open in Suncheon, South Korea, where she and Sun Beibei took the silver medal in the women's doubles. On 24 September 2006, Wang achieved her first gold medal on the Pro Tour at the Japan Open in Yokohama. She repeated the feat against her compatriot Li Jiawei on 12 November at the ITTF Pro Tour German Open in Bayreuth. In June 2007, Wang helped Singapore sweep the women's team, women's doubles and mixed doubles gold trophies at the 17th Commonwealth Table Tennis Championships in Jaipur.

Representing Singapore for the first time at the 2008 Summer Olympics in Beijing, she was a member of the silver medal-winning women's table tennis team, consisting of Li Jiawei, Feng Tianwei and herself. This marked the first time that Singaporeans had won an Olympic medal since Singapore's independence in 1965. The medal came 48 years after weightlifter Tan Howe Liang won the country's first medal, a silver in weightlifting at the 1960 Summer Olympics in Rome. In May 2010 the trio of Wang, Feng Tianwei and Sun stunned the reigning champion China 3–1 in the Liebherr World Team Table Tennis Championships in Moscow, making Singapore world champion for the first time.

Wang won the women's team bronze medal with Feng and Li at the 2012 Summer Olympics in London. She announced her retirement from competitive sports in August 2012.

== Early years ==
Wang Yuegu was born on 10 June 1980 in Anshan, Liaoning. She played professionally in Japanese leagues before relocating to Singapore under the Foreign Sports Talent Scheme in December 2004 in search of more opportunities to prove herself at the international level. She subsequently became a Singapore citizen in 2007.

== Career ==
Wang made her inaugural appearance as a Singaporean on the International Table Tennis Federation (ITTF) Pro Tour in June 2005 at the Volkswagen Korean Open in Suncheon, South Korea, where she and Sun Beibei took the silver medal in the women's doubles. Later that year, she and Sun went on to take two more silvers in doubles matches at the Chinese Taipei Open and Volkswagen (China) Open.

In 2006, Wang came third in the women's singles at the ITTF Pro Tour Chinese Taipei Open held in Taipei, bettering that effort by taking the singles silver medal at the subsequent ITTF Pro Tour Korea Open. On 24 September, Wang achieved her first gold medal on the Pro Tour at the Japan Open in Yokohama, beating China's Guo Yan who was then the number one seed and ranked third in the world. The achievement brought her into the top ten of the women's world ranking list for the first time in her career. Wang repeated her gold-winning feat against compatriot Li Jiawei on 12 November at the ITTF Pro Tour German Open in Bayreuth. In June 2007, Wang helped Singapore sweep the women's team, women's doubles and mixed doubles gold trophies at the 17th Commonwealth Table Tennis Championships in Jaipur. On 20 April 2008, top-seeded Wang beat Li again to the women's singles title at the Brazilian Open. As a singles player, she was ranked seventh in the world as of August 2008.

=== 2008 Summer Olympics ===
Wang represented Singapore for the first time at the 2008 Summer Olympics in the women's table tennis team tournament with her teammates Feng Tianwei and Li Jiawei. On 14 August the team defeated the Netherlands 3–0 to reach the semifinals, but not before a gruelling five-game doubles match against the Dutch players Li Jie and Elena Timina which Li Jiawei and Wang Yuegu eventually won 3–2. During the semifinals against South Korea's Dang Ye-Seo, Kim Kyung-Ah and Park Mi-Young on 15 August, Wang and Li beat Kim and Park in the doubles match, but Wang lost her singles match to Dang. Singapore eventually triumphed over South Korea 3–2.

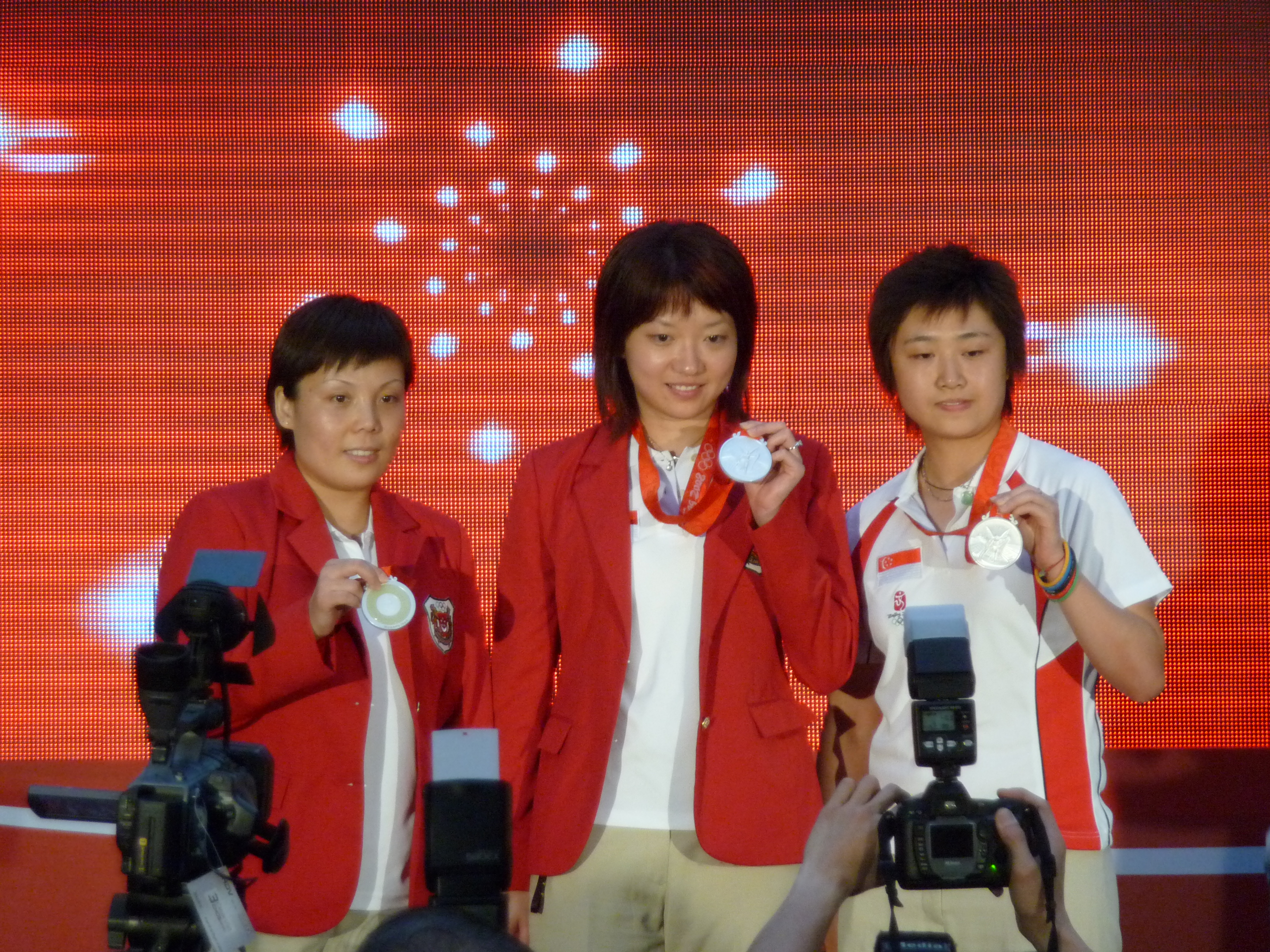
Wang (left) with her women's table tennis teammates Li Jiawei and Feng Tianwei showing off their silver medals won at the 2008 Summer Olympics during a ceremony on 25 August 2008 to welcome Team Singapore home

On 17 August, Wang and her teammates gained Singapore a silver medal in women's table tennis after losing to China in three matches. In the doubles match, Wang and Li were bested by China's Zhang Yining and Guo Yue. This is the first time Singapore has won an Olympic medal since Singapore's independence in 1965. The medal comes 48 years after Tan Howe Liang won the country's first medal, a silver in weightlifting in the lightweight category at the 1960 Summer Olympics in Rome.

Wang and her teammates received byes into the third round of the singles tournament. However, Wang's Olympics came to an end after she was defeated 1–4 by the Dominican Republic's Wu Xue. Seeded fifth in the tournament, Wang was expected to overcome Wu, ranked 50th in the world by the ITTF, without difficulty but made numerous unforced errors. She had beaten Wu at all previous encounters. Team manager Antony Lee attributed Wang's loss to the fact that Wu had played above her usual standard, and that Wang had been unable to cope with the spin from Wu's left-handed serves.

At a victory celebration in Singapore on 25 August, Vivian Balakrishnan, the Minister for Community Development, Youth and Sports, announced that Wang, Feng and Li would be presented with the Pingat Jasa Gemilang (Meritorious Service Medal). This is only the third time the medal will be awarded to athletes, the two previous recipients being weightlifter Tan Howe Liang (1962) and swimmer Joscelin Yeo (2006).

In May 2009, the national table tennis women's team, composed of Wang and her teammates Feng, Li and Sun Beibei, were awarded the Team of the Year (Event) prize at the Singapore Sports Awards.

=== Events between 2008 and 2012 ===
On 22 November 2008, despite crashing out of the singles event earlier, Wang and her teammates Feng and Li won the top title and US$8,000 at the ITTF Pro Tour ERKE German Open in Berlin. In an all-Singapore singles final at the Polish Open in Warsaw on 30 November, Wang took silver against Feng who achieved her first professional singles title. She was fifth in Today newspaper's list of athletes of the year for 2008.

On 24 May 2009, Wang and Yang Zi beat Gao Ning and Sun Beibei to the mixed doubles gold in an all-Singaporean final at the 18th Commonwealth Table Tennis Championships in Glasgow. The next day, Wang also took the singles title from her teammate Yu Mengyu.

Wang participated in the 25th Southeast Asian Games in Vientiane, Laos. She was a member of the Singapore women's team with Feng Tianwei and Sun Beibei that beat Thailand 3–0 on 10 December 2009. On 13 December, she and her partner Yang defeated compatriots Feng and Gao in an all-Singapore final in the mixed doubles. The following day, in another all-Singapore encounter, she and her partner Feng were beaten by Sun Beibei and Yu Mengyu in the women's doubles. The following day, she picked up another silver in the singles competition after battling Feng.

Together with Feng and Sun, Wang was a member of the team at the Liebherr World Team Table Tennis Championships in Moscow that defeated China, 17-time winner and the reigning world champion, with a score of 3–1 on 30 May 2010. This was the first time that Singapore had won the event. In the game she played, Wang beat world number one Liu Shiwen. The Southern Daily published in Guangdong criticized Chinese sports authorities for permitting China-born players like Wang, Feng and Li to leave and play for other countries: "For the sake of developing the sport, China has been talking about 'breeding wolves'. Well, now the wolf has grown up and it has returned home to bite."

On 3 May 2010, the Singapore National Olympic Council named the national women's table tennis team of which she is a member together with Feng Tianwei, Zena Sim Kai Xin, Sun Beibei and Yu Mengyu as Team of the Year (Team Event) for 2009. Later in the year, she clinched the gold in the women's singles at the 2010 Japan Open of the ITTF Pro Tour on 4 July, beating Zhu Yuling 4–0 in less than half an hour.

At the 2010 Commonwealth Games in Delhi, Wang and her colleagues Feng and Li beat the hosts to take the women's team gold medal on 8 October. She also won the mixed doubles competition with Yang on 12 October, took silver with Feng in the women's doubles on 14 October, and clinched the bronze medal in the singles the day before. Subsequently, at the 2010 Asian Games in Guangzhou, Wang and her teammates Feng and Li achieved the silver in the women's team event on 16 November.

=== 2012 Summer Olympics ===
Wang represented Singapore at the 2012 Summer Olympics in London. In the women's singles, she was defeated 4–1 by Japan's Kasumi Ishikawa in the quarterfinals on 31 July. She also participated in the women's team competition with Feng Tianwei and Li Jiawei. They were beaten 0–3 by Japan in the semifinals, but took the bronze medal on 7 August by edging South Korea out 3–0. Feng defeated Kim Kyung Ah 11–9, 11–8, 4–11, 13–11; and Li also successfully fended off Seok Ha Jung 11–5, 11–8, 6–11, 11–8. Li and Wang then succeeded in the doubles game against Seok and Dang Ye Seo 11–9, 11–6, 6–11, 11–5. This marked the first time Singapore had won more than one medal at an Olympic Games.

=== Retirement ===
On 29 August 2012, Wang announced to The Straits Times that she had submitted her resignation from competitive sports on 24 August to spend more time with her mother and husband.

Wang indicated that she would like to start a family, and to study economics and management, or sport psychology. She said: "It's the right time to leave. I'm getting old, I've been injured, and I've a family now. It's time to give our youth paddlers a chance. If it's still the three of us [Feng Tianwei, Li Jiawei and herself] at Rio in 2016, it's not good for the development of Singapore sport."

== Personal life ==
Wang was married to Gabriel Lee, a Taiwanese based in Germany. In July 2016, she started divorce proceedings against Lee within a month of giving birth to her first child, and was divorced three months later. It was reported that Lee was having an affair with a mother of four children prior to the divorce.

== Medals ==
Event	Medal	Date	Competition
2005
Women's doubles (with Sun Beibei)	Silver	12 June 2005	International Table Tennis Federation (ITTF) Pro Tour Volkswagen Korean Open; Suncheon, Jeollanam-do, South Korea
Women's doubles (with Sun Beibei)	Silver	19 June 2005	ITTF Pro Tour TMS Chinese Taipei Open; Taipei, Chinese Taipei
Women's doubles (with Sun Beibei)	Silver	18 September 2005	ITTF Pro Tour Volkswagen (China) Open; Shenzhen, Guangdong, People's Republic of China
2006
Women's singles	Silver	1–4 June 2006	ITTF Pro Tour Korean Open; Jeonju, Jeollabuk-do, South Korea
Women's singles	Bronze	11 June 2006	ITTF Pro Tour TMS Chinese Taipei Open; Taipei, Chinese Taipei
Women's singles	Gold	24 September 2006	ITTF Pro Tour Japan Open; Yokohama, Kanagawa Prefecture, Japan
Women's singles	Silver	1–5 November 2006	ITTF Pro Tour Eurosib Russian Open; Saint Petersburg, Russia
Women's singles	Gold	12 November 2006	ITTF Pro Tour Liebherr German Open; Bayreuth, Bavaria, Germany
2007
Women's team (with Sun Beibei and Tan Paey Fern)	Gold	2 June 2007	17th Commonwealth Table Tennis Championships; Jaipur, Rajasthan, India
Mixed doubles (with Yang Zi)	Gold	4 June 2007	17th Commonwealth Table Tennis Championships; Jaipur, Rajasthan, India
Women's singles	Silver	5 June 2007	17th Commonwealth Table Tennis Championships; Jaipur, Rajasthan, India
Women's doubles (with Sun Beibei)	Gold	5 June 2007	17th Commonwealth Table Tennis Championships; Jaipur, Rajasthan, India
2008
Women's team (with Feng Tianwei, Li Jiawei, Sun Beibei and Yu Mengyu)	Silver	1 March 2008	Evergrande Real Estate World Team Table Tennis Championships; Guangzhou, Guangdong, People's Republic of China
Women's singles	Gold	20 April 2008	ITTF Pro Tour Brazilian Open; Belo Horizonte, Brazil
Women's team (with Feng Tianwei and Li Jiawei)	Silver	24 May 2008	ITTF Pro Tour Volkswagen Japan Open; Yokohama, Kanagawa Prefecture, Japan
Women's team (with Feng Tianwei and Li Jiawei)	Silver	13–17 August 2008	2008 Summer Olympics; Beijing, People's Republic of China
Women's team (with Feng Tianwei and Li Jiawei)	Gold	22 November 2008	ITTF Pro Tour ERKE German Open; Berlin, Germany
Women's singles	Silver	30 November 2008	ITTF Pro Tour Polish Open; Warsaw, Poland
2009
Mixed doubles (with Yang Zi)	Gold	24 May 2009	18th Commonwealth Table Tennis Championships; Glasgow, Scotland
Women's singles	Gold	25 May 2009	18th Commonwealth Table Tennis Championships; Glasgow, Scotland
Women's team (with Feng Tianwei, Sim Kaixin Zena, Sun Beibei and Yu Mengyu)	Gold	10 December 2009	25th Southeast Asian Games; Vientiane, Laos
Mixed doubles (with Yang Zi)	Gold	13 December 2009	25th Southeast Asian Games; Vientiane, Laos
Women's doubles (with Feng Tianwei)	Silver	14 December 2009	25th Southeast Asian Games; Vientiane, Laos
Women's singles	Silver	15 December 2009	25th Southeast Asian Games; Vientiane, Laos
2010
Women's team (with Feng Tianwei, Li Jiawei, Sun Beibei and Yu Mengyu)	Gold	30 May 2010	Liebherr World Team Table Tennis Championships; Moscow, Russia
Women's singles	Gold	4 July 2010	ITTF Pro Tour Japan Open; Kobe, Hyōgo Prefecture, Japan
Women's singles	Bronze	15 August 2010	ITTF Pro Tour Korean Open; Incheon, South Korea
Women's team (with Feng Tianwei and Li Jiawei)	Gold	8 October 2010	19th Commonwealth Games; Delhi, India
Mixed doubles (with Yang Zi)	Gold	12 October 2010	19th Commonwealth Games; Delhi, India
Women's singles	Bronze	13 October 2010	19th Commonwealth Games; Delhi, India
Women's doubles (with Feng Tianwei)	Silver	14 October 2010	19th Commonwealth Games; Delhi, India
Women's team (with Feng Tianwei and Li Jiawei)	Silver	16 November 2010	16th Asian Games; Guangzhou, Guangdong, China
2012
Women's team (with Feng Tianwei and Li Jiawei)	Bronze	7 August 2012	2012 Summer Olympics; London, United Kingdom

== See also ==
- Singapore at the 2008 Summer Olympics
- Singapore at the 2012 Summer Olympics
- Table tennis at the 2008 Summer Olympics
- Table tennis at the 2012 Summer Olympics
- List of Singapore world champions in sports
