= Đoàn Kiến Quốc =

Vietnamese table tennis player (born 1979)

Personal information
- Nationality: Vietnam
- Born: 24 March 1979 (age 47) Nha Trang, Khánh Hòa, Vietnam
- Height: 1.65 m (5 ft 5 in)
- Weight: 59 kg (130 lb)

Sport
- Sport: Table tennis
- Playing style: Left-handed, shakehand grip
- Highest ranking: 171 (December 2008)
Medal record
Men's table tennis
Representing Vietnam
Southeast Asian Games
Gold medal – first place	2009 Vientiane	Doubles
Silver medal – second place	1999 Bandar Seri Begawan	Team
Silver medal – second place	2005 Manila	Team
Bronze medal – third place	1999 Bandar Seri Begawan	Doubles
Bronze medal – third place	2001 Kuala Lumpur	Singles
Bronze medal – third place	2001 Kuala Lumpur	Team
Bronze medal – third place	2003 Hanoi	Team
Bronze medal – third place	2005 Manila	Singles
Bronze medal – third place	2007 Nakhon Ratchasima	Team
Bronze medal – third place	2009 Vientiane	Team

Đoàn Kiến Quốc (born 24 March 1979 in Nha Trang) is a Vietnamese table tennis player. He won a gold medal, along with his partner Dinh Quang Linh in the men's doubles, at the 2009 Southeast Asian Games in Vientiane, Laos. As of November 2012, he is ranked no. 275 in the world by the International Table Tennis Federation (ITTF). Doan is also left-handed, and uses the shakehand grip.

Doan made his official debut for the 2004 Summer Olympics in Athens, where he competed in the men's singles. He lost the first preliminary round match to a Chinese-born Italian table tennis player Yang Min, with a set score of 1–4.

At the 2008 Summer Olympics in Beijing, Doan qualified for the second time in the men's singles, after receiving a ticket from the Southeast Asian Qualification Tournament in Singapore. Unlike his previous Olympics, Doan defeated Australia's David Zalcberg and Olympic veteran Christophe Legoût of France in the preliminary rounds, before losing out his next match to Russia's Alexei Smirnov, with another set score of 1–4.
