= Gao Ning =

Singaporean table tennis player

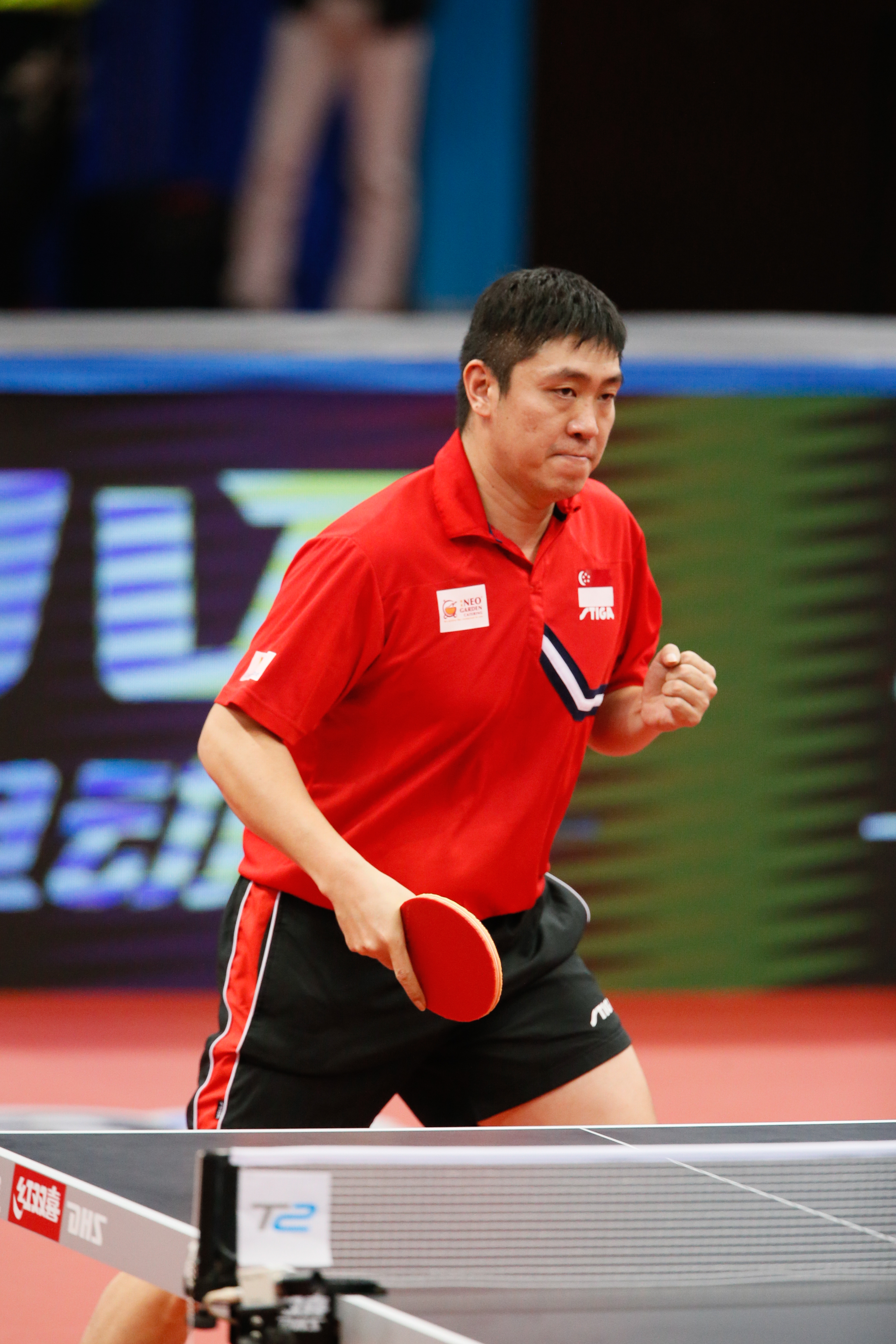
- Gao in 2017

Personal information
- Native name: 高宁
- Nationality: Singapore
- Born: 11 October 1982 (age 43) Xinji, Shijiazhuang, Hebei, China
- Height: 1.79 m (5 ft 10 in)
- Weight: 80 kg (176 lb; 12 st 8 lb)

Sport
- Sport: Table tennis
- Club: Chartres ASTT
- Playing style: Right-handed, shakehand grip
- Highest ranking: 9 (April 2008)
- Current ranking: 34 (August 2016)
Medal record
Men's Table Tennis
Representing Singapore
Event	1st	2nd	3rd
Asian Games	0	0	1
Asian Championships	1	1	1
Asian Cup	1	1	1
Commonwealth Games	5	4	0
Southeast Asian Games	11	5	1
Total	18	11	4
Asian Games
Bronze medal – third place	2014 Incheon	Doubles
Asian Championships
Gold medal – first place	2012 Macau	Doubles
Silver medal – second place	2012 Macau	Mixed doubles
Bronze medal – third place	2013 Busan	Doubles
Asian Cup
Gold medal – first place	2007 Hanoi	Singles
Silver medal – second place	2010 Guangzhou	Singles
Bronze medal – third place	2008 Sapporo	Singles
Commonwealth Games
Gold medal – first place	2010 Delhi	Team
Gold medal – first place	2014 Glasgow	Doubles
Gold medal – first place	2014 Glasgow	Team
Gold medal – first place	2018 Gold Coast	Singles
Gold medal – first place	2018 Gold Coast	Mixed doubles
Silver medal – second place	2010 Delhi	Singles
Silver medal – second place	2010 Delhi	Doubles
Silver medal – second place	2010 Delhi	Mixed doubles
Silver medal – second place	2014 Glasgow	Singles
Southeast Asian Games
Gold medal – first place	2007 Nakhon Ratchasima	Singles
Gold medal – first place	2007 Nakhon Ratchasima	Doubles
Gold medal – first place	2007 Nakhon Ratchasima	Team
Gold medal – first place	2009 Vientiane	Singles
Gold medal – first place	2009 Vientiane	Team
Gold medal – first place	2011 Jakarta-Palembang	Singles
Gold medal – first place	2015 Singapore	Singles
Gold medal – first place	2015 Singapore	Doubles
Gold medal – first place	2015 Singapore	Team
Gold medal – first place	2017 Kuala Lumpur	Singles
Gold medal – first place	2017 Kuala Lumpur	Doubles
Silver medal – second place	2007 Nakhon Ratchasima	Mixed doubles
Silver medal – second place	2009 Vientiane	Mixed doubles
Silver medal – second place	2011 Jakarta-Palembang	Doubles
Silver medal – second place	2011 Jakarta-Palembang	Mixed doubles
Silver medal – second place	2017 Kuala Lumpur	Team
Bronze medal – third place	2009 Vientiane	Doubles

Gao Ning (simplified Chinese: 高宁; traditional Chinese: 高寧; pinyin: Gāo Níng; born 11 October 1982) is a retired Chinese-born Singaporean table tennis player. He is currently appointed as the Singapore Table Tennis National Coach for men. He is considered Singapore's best male player with a world ranking of 34 as of August 2016. He was first in men's singles at the 2007 Commonwealth Table Tennis Championships. In 2018, Gao and Yu Mengyu won the men's singles and mixed doubles at the Commonwealth Games .

He won a gold medal as a team member plus silver medals in the men's singles and men's doubles at the 2010 Commonwealth Games in Delhi.

Gao Ning cried after his singles match defeat to an opponent in the Beijing 2008 Olympics as no coach was available to guide him during the match. His coach was sick before the match. The scene of him in tears was telecast on local TV, causing the head coach of the Singapore table tennis team to lose his job.

At the 2014 Commonwealth Games, he won another two gold medals and a silver. The gold medals came in the men's doubles, with Li Hu, and the men's team, again with Li, and Zhan Jian. The silver came in the men's individual, where he lost the final to his teammate Zhan.

== Career records ==
Singles (as of 22 April 2015)

- Olympics: round of 16 (2012).
- World Championships: round of 16 (2007, 2013).
- World Cup appearances: 3. Record: 5-8th (2007).
- ITTF World Tour winner (2): India Open 2007; Chile Open 2012.
  Runner-up (1): Brazil Open 2007.
- ITTF World Tour Grand Finals appearances: 4. Record: SF (2011).
- Asian Games: QF (2010).
- Asian Championships: round of 16 (2007, 2009).
- Asian Cup: 1st (2007); 2nd (2010); 3rd (2008).

Men's doubles

- World Championships: QF (2009).
- Pro Tour winner (6): India, Austrian Open 2007; Chile Open 2008; India Open 2009; Kuwait Open 2012; UAE 2013.
  Runner-up (10): Russian, German Open 2006; Brazil, Chile, Korea, Chinese Taipei, German, Swedish Open 2007; Polish Open 2008; India Open 2010.
- Pro Tour Grand Finals appearances: 6. Record: winner (2008, 2012); runner-up (2009, 2010).
- Asian Championships: winner (2012); SF (2013).

Mixed doubles

- World Championships: round of 16 (2009, 2011).

Team

- Olympics: 5th (2012).
- World Championships: 5th (2014).
- Commonwealth Games: winner (2010).
