= Table tennis at the 2009 SEA Games =

- Venue: Convention Hall, National University
- Location: Vientiane, Laos
- Dates: 8–15 December
- Nations: 9

Table tennis events at the 2009 SEA Games took place in the Convention Hall, National University, Vientiane, Laos from 8 to 15 December 2009.

== Medalists ==
| Event | Gold | Silver | Bronze |
|---|---|---|---|
| Men's singles | Gao Ning; Singapore | Yang Zi; Singapore | Richard Gonzales; Philippines |
| Men's singles | Gao Ning; Singapore | Yang Zi; Singapore | Phakpoom Sanguansin; Thailand |
| Men's doubles | Vietnam (VIE); Doan Kien Quoc; Dinh Quang Linh | Vietnam (VIE); Tran Tuan Quynh; Nguyen Nam Hai | Singapore (SIN); Gao Ning; Yang Zi |
| Men's doubles | Vietnam (VIE); Doan Kien Quoc; Dinh Quang Linh | Vietnam (VIE); Tran Tuan Quynh; Nguyen Nam Hai | Singapore (SIN); Cai Xiaoli; Pang Xue Jie |
| Men's team | Singapore (SIN); Gao Ning; Yang Zi; Cai Xiaoli | Thailand (THA); Phakpoom Sanguansin; Phuchong Sanguansin; Chaisit Chaitat | Vietnam (VIE); Doan Kien Quoc; Nguyen Nam Hai; Tran Tuan Quynh |
| Men's team | Singapore (SIN); Gao Ning; Yang Zi; Cai Xiaoli | Thailand (THA); Phakpoom Sanguansin; Phuchong Sanguansin; Chaisit Chaitat | Indonesia (INA); Yon Mardiyono; Muhammad Hussein; David Jacobs |
| Women's singles | Feng Tianwei; Singapore | Wang Yuegu; Singapore | Nanthana Komwong; Thailand |
| Women's singles | Feng Tianwei; Singapore | Wang Yuegu; Singapore | Beh Lee Wei; Malaysia |
| Women's doubles | Singapore (SIN); Sun Beibei; Yu Mengyu | Singapore (SIN); Wang Yuegu; Feng Tianwei | Vietnam (VIE); Mai Hoang My Trang; Mai Xuan Hang |
| Women's doubles | Singapore (SIN); Sun Beibei; Yu Mengyu | Singapore (SIN); Wang Yuegu; Feng Tianwei | Thailand (THA); Anisara Muangsuk; Nanthana Komwong |
| Women's team | Singapore (SIN); Wang Yuegu; Feng Tianwei; Sun Beibei | Thailand (THA); Nanthana Komwong; Suthasini Sawettabut; Anisara Muangsuk | Malaysia (MAS); Fan Xiao Jun; Beh Lee Wei; Chiu Soo Jiin |
| Women's team | Singapore (SIN); Wang Yuegu; Feng Tianwei; Sun Beibei | Thailand (THA); Nanthana Komwong; Suthasini Sawettabut; Anisara Muangsuk | Vietnam (VIE); Mai Hoang My Trang; Mai Xuan Hang; Luong Thi Tam |
| Mixed doubles | Singapore (SIN); Yang Zi; Wang Yuegu | Singapore (SIN); Gao Ning; Feng Tianwei | Malaysia (MAS); Muhd Shakirin Ibrahim; Beh Lee Wei |
| Mixed doubles | Singapore (SIN); Yang Zi; Wang Yuegu | Singapore (SIN); Gao Ning; Feng Tianwei | Thailand (THA); Phakpoom Sanguansin; Nanthana Komwong |

== Medal table by country ==
* Host nation (Laos)

| Rank | Nation | Gold | Silver | Bronze | Total |
|---|---|---|---|---|---|
| 1 | Singapore | 6 | 4 | 2 | 12 |
| 2 | Vietnam | 1 | 1 | 3 | 5 |
| 3 | Thailand | 0 | 2 | 4 | 6 |
| 4 | Malaysia | 0 | 0 | 3 | 3 |
| 5 | Indonesia | 0 | 0 | 1 | 1 |
| 5 | Philippines | 0 | 0 | 1 | 1 |
| Totals (6 entries) | | 7 | 7 | 14 | 28 |

| Preceded by 2007 | Table tennis at the SEA Games; 2009 SEA Games | Succeeded by 2011 |
