= National University of Laos =

University in Vientiene, Laos

Coordinates: 18.0365°N 102.6366°E

- ມະຫາວິທະຍາໄລແຫ່ງຊາດລາວ
- Type: Public
- Established: October 1996; 30 years ago
- Total staff: 1,455
- Students: 14,294
- Location: Vientiane, Laos
- Website: www.nuol.edu.la

The National University of Laos (NUOL) is a national public university in Vientiane, the capital of Laos, and the only national university in the country. It was founded in 1996 with departments brought in from other existing colleges. NUOL accepts students from all over Laos, along with international students.

NUOL offers both undergraduate and postgraduate programs, and is a research university. It is a member of the ASEAN University Network and the Greater Mekong Sub-Region Academic and Research Network. As of 2026, total enrollment was 14,294 students.

== History ==
=== Background ===
Tertiary education in Laos was not a significant governmental priority until circa 1975, due to a combination of lack of government funds and opportunities for Laotian students to study in Soviet bloc countries where educational capacity and funding were greater. Between 1975 and 1986, various post-secondary institutions were created for local training of professionals.

Prior to the establishment of NUOL, there were three formal universities in the Laotian educational system: the Pedagogical University of Vientiane, which trained teachers; the National Polytechnic Institute, which trained engineers; and the University of Medical Sciences, which trained medical professionals. There were additionally a number of other post-secondary technical institutions operated by various departments of the Laotian government, including the Ministry of Agriculture and Forestry and the Ministry of Public Health; however, poor coordination between their governing ministries meant that the quality of education was inconsistent.

=== Formation ===
In 1995, the government of Laos decided to solve the problem of lack of coordination and inconsistent tertiary education by creating a new National University by the Prime Ministerial Decree on the Establishment of the National University of Laos. At this time, 8 institutions were merged into the NUOL, with two more merged in over the next three years. This resulted in a significant reduction of cost per student, achieving some of the government's aims. Ultimately, ten institutions were combined into the new National University:

- the Pedagogical University of Vientiane;
- the Polytechnic University;
- the Medical Science University;
- the Nabong College of Agriculture;
- the Dongdok College of Forestry;
- the Tadthong College of Irrigation;
- the Institute of Architecture;
- the Institute of Transportation;
- the College of Electricity and Electronics; and
- the Centre for Establishment of Veunkham Agro-Forestry University.

=== Growth ===
To support the continued growth of NUOL, two satellite campuses were established in the early 2000s: in the south of the country, Champasak University in Pakse in 2002; and in the north of the country, Souphanouvong University in Luang Prabang in 2003. In 2007, the administration of NUOL was made autonomous by the Prime Ministerial Decree on the Adoption and Implementation of the National Education System Reform Strategy, and the satellite campuses were given their own autonomy from NUOL by two Prime Ministerial Decrees in 2009.

At this time, the regular courses of the university were tuition-free and taught in the Lao language, while evening classes were offered in English for a fee, which put strain on teaching staff. Subsequently, tuition fees were introduced, alongside scholarships for low-income students.

== Structure and governance ==
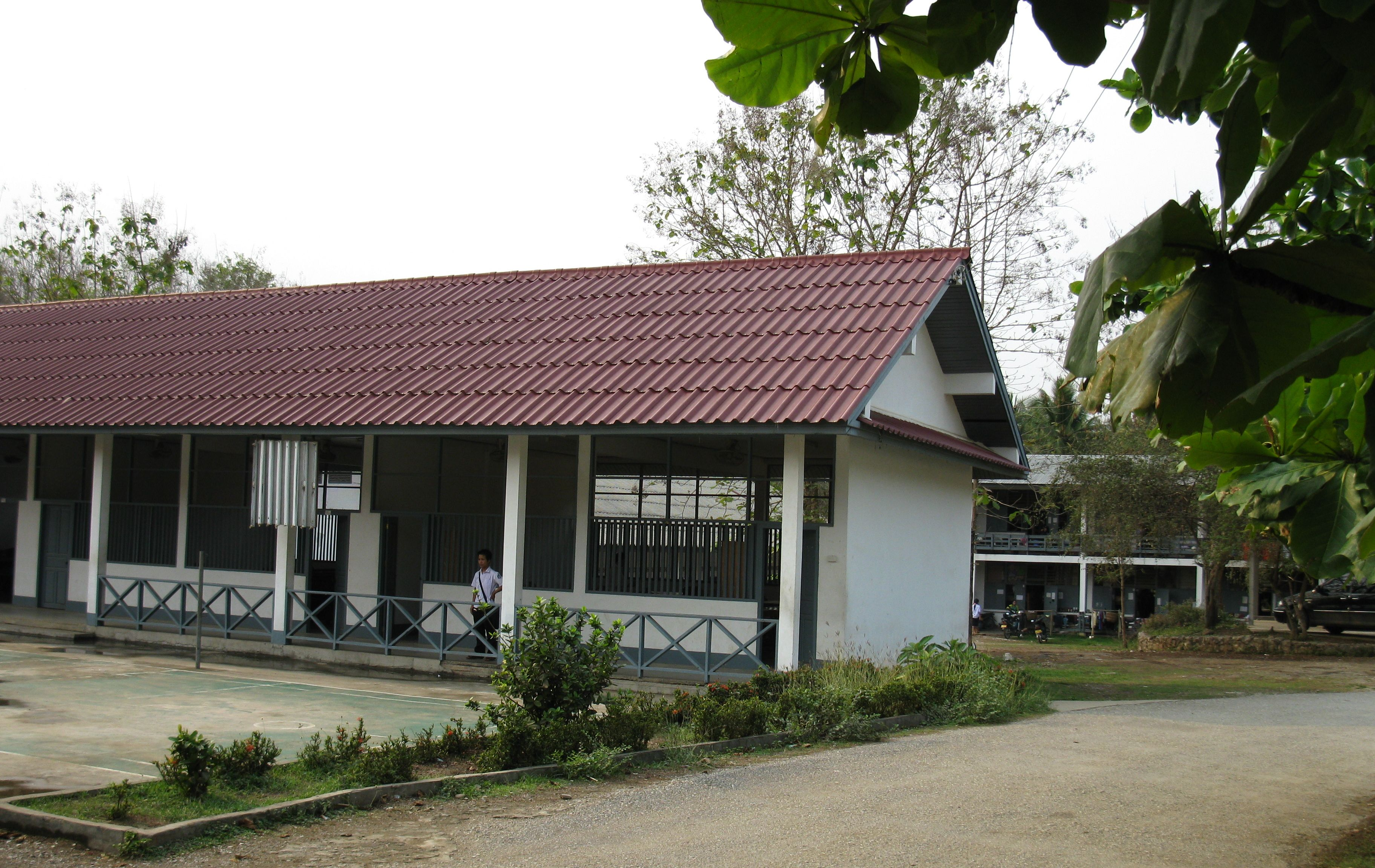
Campus of Luang Prabang

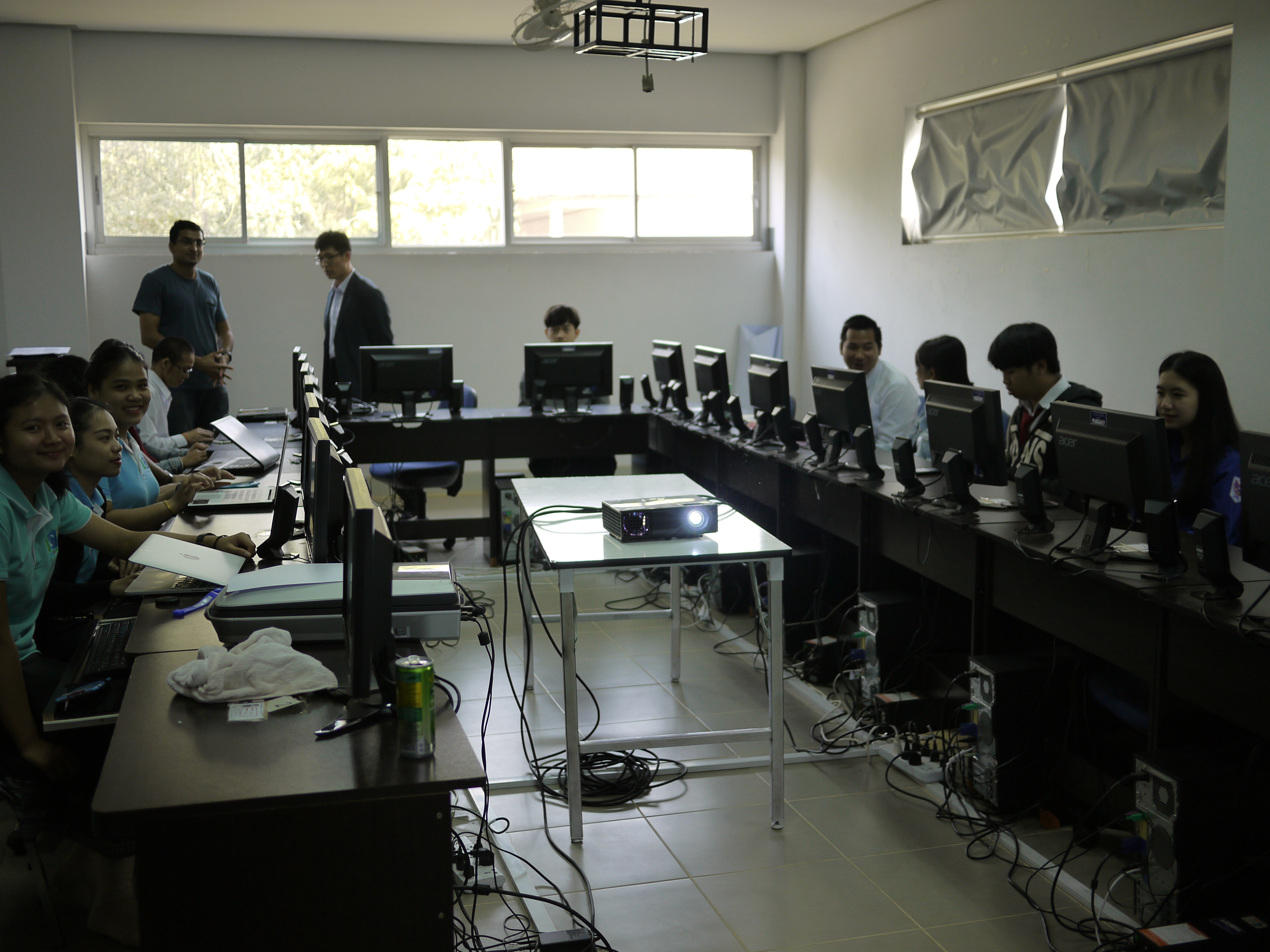
FLPS students at National University of Laos (Donnokkhoum campus) discuss Wikipedia

NUOL is administered autonomously; it has its own Board of Academic Affairs, Executive Board, and University Council.

NUOL has six campuses:

- Dongdok Main Campus;
- Donenokkhoum Campus;
- Kilometre Five Campus
- Phiavat Campus;
- Sokpaluang Campus; and
- Tatthong Campus.

The university consists of 12 faculties:

- the Faculty of Forestry;
- the Faculty of Education;
- the Faculty of Social Sciences;
- the Faculty of Sciences;
- the Faculty of Letters;
- the Faculty of Economics and Business Administration;
- the Faculty of Agriculture;
- the Faculty of Law and Political Science;
- the Faculty of Engineering;
- the Faculty of Medical Science;
- the Faculty of Architecture; and
- the Faculty of Environment and Development Studies.
