= List of Foreign Sports Talent Scheme athletes =

The Foreign Sports Talent Scheme is used by sports officials and organizations in Singapore to scout and facilitate the migration of non-Singaporeans deemed to possess sports talent to play in Singapore colours in sporting events. Introduced in 1993 by the Singapore Table Tennis Association, it also aimed to boost local sporting standards by importing sporting expertise.

In March 2008, it was announced in the Parliament of Singapore that 54 athletes had benefited from the programme and received Singapore citizenship, of which 37 were still in active training.

== Athletics ==
- Zhang Guirong
- Dong Enxin (returned to native country)
- Du Xianhui
- Luan Wei
- E Xiaoxu

== Billiards ==
- Peter Gilchrist

== Badminton ==
- Dellis Yuliana
- Hendra Wijaya
- Hendri Saputra
- Jiang Yanmei
- Li Yujia
- Liu Fan
- Robin Gonansa
- Ronald Susilo
- Shinta Mulia Sari
- Chayut Triyachart (retired due to injury)
- Febriyan Irvannaldy (returned to native country)
- Fu Mingtian (retired, became badminton coach and returned to native country)
- Gu Juan
- Huang Chao (retired due to injury)
- Li Li (quit national team and returned to native country)
- Xiao Luxi (returned to native country)
- Xing Aiying (retired due to injury)
- Yao Lei (quit national team and returned to native country)
- Zhang Beiwen (dropped by Singapore Badminton Association)
- Zhou Lei

== Basketball ==
- Li Ling (Switched to national netball team in 2005 and retired in 2011)
- Zhao Jing
- Li Lin (left Singapore)
- Yao Xiuxiu (in Singapore)
- Zhang Shu (left Singapore)

== Chess ==
- Wu Shaobin

== Football ==
- Egmar Goncalves (returned to native country)
- Mirko Grabovac
- Daniel Bennett
- Agu Casmir
- Itimi Dickson
- Shi Jiayi
- Mustafic Fahrudin
- Precious Emuejeraye
- Qiu Li

== Field hockey ==
- Chen Huiling
- Li Ying
- Ma Xiaomeng
- Niu Lei
- Qi Hui (retired in 2007)
- Zhang Jun

== Water polo ==
- Luo Nan

== Table tennis ==
- Cai Xiaoli (retired in 2011 and became the assistant coach of the national women's team)
- Chen Feng (retired in 2017)
- Feng Tianwei
- Gao Ning (retired in 2018 and became the head coach of the national men's team)
- Lin Ye (table tennis)
- Li Hu (sacked in 2016)
- Yu Mengyu (retired in 2022)
- Duan Yongjun (retired)
- Jing Junhong (retired – moved to Singapore prior to introduction of FST, but citizenship was fast-tracked)
- Li Li (returned to China)
- Li Jiawei (retired in 2012, returned to Beijing)
- Ma Liang (retired, stayed in Singapore as coach)
- Sun Beibei (retired in 2012, stayed in Singapore as coach)
- Wang Yuegu (retired in 2012, stayed in Singapore as coach)
- Xu Yan (returned to native country)
- Yang Zi (retired in 2017)
- Zeng Jian
- Zhan Jian (retired in 2015)
- Zhang Taiyong (retired)
- Zhang Xueling (returned to native country)
- Zhou Yihan
