= Commonwealth Table Tennis Championships =

Tennis competition

The Commonwealth Table Tennis Championships was born at a meeting of Commonwealth delegates in Munich at the 1969 World Championships. Prior to inclusion in the Commonwealth Games proper in 2002, 15 Commonwealth Championships have taken place since 1971.

== Venues ==
1. 1971 — Singapore — Singapore Badminton Stadium (20 March to 25 March)
2. 1973 — Cardiff, Wales — National Sports Centre (26 March to 1 April)
3. 1975 — Melbourne, Australia — Town Hall (25 January to 31 January)
4. 1977 — St Peter Port, Guernsey — Beau Sejour Leisure Centre (16 March to 22 March)
5. 1979 — Edinburgh, Scotland — Meadowbank Sports Centre (12 April to 18 April)
6. 1982 — Bombay, India — Temporary stadium on cricket pitch at Khar Gymkhana (3 February to 9 February)
7. 1983 — Kuala Lumpur, Malaysia — Stadium Negara (17 April to 23 April)
8. 1985 — Douglas, Isle of Man — Palace Lido Ballroom (17 March to 23 March)
9. 1989 — Cardiff, Wales — National Sports Centre (20 March to 26 March)
10. 1991 — Nairobi, Kenya — Moi International Sports Centre (14 April to 21 April)
11. 1994 — Hyderabad, Andhra Pradesh, India — Lal Bahadur Indoor Stadium (25 January to 1 February)
12. 1995 — Singapore — Singapore Badminton Hall (21 April to 28 April)
13. 1997 — Glasgow, Scotland — Kelvin Hall (14 April to 20 April)
14. 2000 — Singapore — Singapore Table Tennis Academy and Toa Payoh Sports Hall (11 February to 17 February)
15. 2001 — New Delhi, India — Indira Gandhi Indoor Stadium (14 April to 20 April)
16. 2004 — Kuala Lumpur, Malaysia — Kuala Lumpur Badminton Stadium (21 June to 27 June)
17. 2007 — Jaipur, India — SMS Indoor Stadium (30 May to 5 June)
18. 2009 — Glasgow, Scotland — Scotstoun Leisure Centre (19 May to 25 May)
19. 2013 — New Delhi, India — Thyagraj Indoor Stadium (5 May to 10 May)
20. 2015 — Surat, India — Pandit Dindayal Upadhyay Indoor Stadium (16 December to 21 December)
21. 2019 — Cuttack, India — Jawahar Lal Nehru Indoor Stadium (17 July to 22 July)
22. 2026 — New Delhi, India — Thyagraj Indoor Stadium (27 July to 2 August)

== Winners ==
Year	Team		Singles		Doubles		
Year	Men's	Women's	Men's	Women's	Men's	Women's	Mixed
2026	India	India	(India) Ankur Bhattacharjee	(India) Yashaswini Ghorpade	(Malaysia) Javen Choong (Malaysia) Qi Shen Wong	(India) Syndrela Das (India) Sreeja Akula	(India) Taneesha Kotecha (India) Manav Thakkar
2019	India	India	(India) Harmeet Desai	(India) Ayhika Mukherjee	(India) Manav Thakkar Anthony Amalraj	(India) Pooja Sahasrabudhe Krittwika Sinha Roy	(India) Sathiyan Gnanasekaran; Archana Kamath
2015	India	Singapore	(Singapore) Chen Feng	(Singapore) Zhou Yihan	(India) Soumyajit Ghosh; Harmeet Desai	(Singapore) Lin Ye; Zhou Yihan	(India) Sathiyan Gnanasekaran; Ankita Das
2013	Singapore	Singapore	(Singapore) Zhan Jian	(Canada) Zhang Mo	(Singapore) Zhan Jian; Yang Zi	(Singapore) Feng Tianwei; Yu Mengyu	(Singapore) Zhan Jian; Zhou Yihan
2009	Singapore	Singapore	(Singapore) Gao Ning	(Singapore) Wang Yuegu	(India) Subhajit Saha; Sharath Kamal	(Singapore) Sun Beibei; Yu Mengyu	(Singapore) Yang Zi; Wang Yuegu
2007	Singapore	Singapore	(Singapore) Gao Ning	(Singapore) Sun Beibei	(Nigeria) Kazeem Nosiru Ekundayo; Monday Merotohun	(Singapore) Wang Yuegu; Sun Beibei	(Singapore) Yang Zi; Wang Yuegu
2004	India	Singapore	(India) Sharath Kamal	(Singapore) Xu Yan	(Wales) Adam Robertson; Ryan Jenkins	(Singapore) Zhang Xueling; Tan Paey Fern	(Singapore) Cai Xiao Li; Zhang Xueling
2001	Nigeria	Singapore	(England) Matthew Syed	(Singapore) Li Jiawei	(England) Terry Young; Alex Perry	(Singapore) Jing Junhong; Li Jiawei	(Singapore) Duan Yong Jun; Li Jiawei
2000	England	Singapore	(England) Matthew Syed	(Singapore) Li Jiawei	(India) Chetan Baboor; Subramaniam Raman	(Singapore) Jing Junhong; Li Jiawei	(Singapore) Cai Xiao Li; Zhang Xueling
1997	England	Singapore	(England) Matthew Syed	(Singapore) Jing Junhong	(India) Chetan Baboor; Subramaniam Raman	(Singapore) Jing Junhong; Li Jiawei	(Singapore) Lai Chin Pang; Li Jiawei
1995	Hong Kong	Hong Kong	(Hong Kong) Chan Kong Wah	(Hong Kong) Chai Po Wa	(England) Carl Prean; Andrew Eden	(Hong Kong) Chai Po Wa; Chan Tan Lui	(Hong Kong) Lo Chuen Tsung; Chai Po Wa
1994	England	Hong Kong	(Canada) Johnny Huang	(Hong Kong) Chai Po Wa	(Canada) Johnny Huang; Gideon Joe Ng	(Hong Kong) Chai Po Wa; Chan Tan Lui	(Canada) Johnny Huang; Barbara Chiu
1991	England	Hong Kong	(Canada) Johnny Huang	(Hong Kong) Chai Po Wa	(England) Michael O'Driscoll; Chris Oldfield	(Hong Kong) Chai Po Wa; Chan Tan Lui	(Hong Kong) Chan Chi Ming; Chan Tan Lui
1989	England	Hong Kong	(England) Alan Cooke	(Hong Kong) Chai Po Wa	(England) Skylet Andrew; Nicky Mason	(Hong Kong) Chai Po Wa; Chan Tan Lui	(Hong Kong) Lui Fuk Man; Chan Tan Lui
1985	England	England	(England) Desmond Douglas	(England) Karen Witt	(Nigeria) Atanda Musa; Francis Sule	(Canada) Mariann Domonkos; Gloria Hsu	(England) Desmond Douglas; Alison Gordon
1983	Hong Kong	Hong Kong	(Hong Kong) Chiu Man Kuen	(Hong Kong) Yue Kam Kai	(Hong Kong) Chiu Man Kuen; Vong Iu Veng	(Hong Kong) Mak Ka Sha; Chai Man	(Hong Kong) Chan Kong Wah; Hui So-Hung
1982	England	England	(Nigeria) Atanda Musa	(England) Carole Knight	(Nigeria) Atanda Musa; Sunday Eboh	(England) Carole Knight; Joy Grundy	(England) Nigel Eckersley; Joy Grundy
1979	Hong Kong	Hong Kong	(Hong Kong) Vong Iu Veng	(Hong Kong) Hui So-Hung	(Australia) Robert Javor; Stephen Knapp	(England) Carole Knight; Linda Howard	(England) Jimmy Walker; Linda Howard
1977	Hong Kong	Hong Kong	(Hong Kong) Li Kuang Tsu	(Hong Kong) Chang Siu-Ying	(Hong Kong) Chen Sheng-Shien; Vong Iu Veng	(England) Melody Ludi; Karen Witt	(Hong Kong) Li Kuang Tsu; Siu Kit Man
1975	England	England	(England) Trevor Taylor	(England) Jill Hammersley	(England) Denis Neale; Desmond Douglas	(England) Jill Hammersley; Linda Howard	(England) Desmond Douglas; Linda Howard
1973	England	England	(England) Trevor Taylor	(England) Jill (Shirley) Hammersley	(England) Denis Neale; Trevor Taylor	(England) Jill Hammersley; Susan Howard	(England) Denis Neale; Karenza Matthews
1971	England	England	(England) Trevor Taylor	(England) Jill Shirley	(England) Alan Hydes; Trevor Taylor	(England) Karenza Matthews; Pauline Piddock	(England) Alan Hydes; Pauline Piddock

== Gallery ==
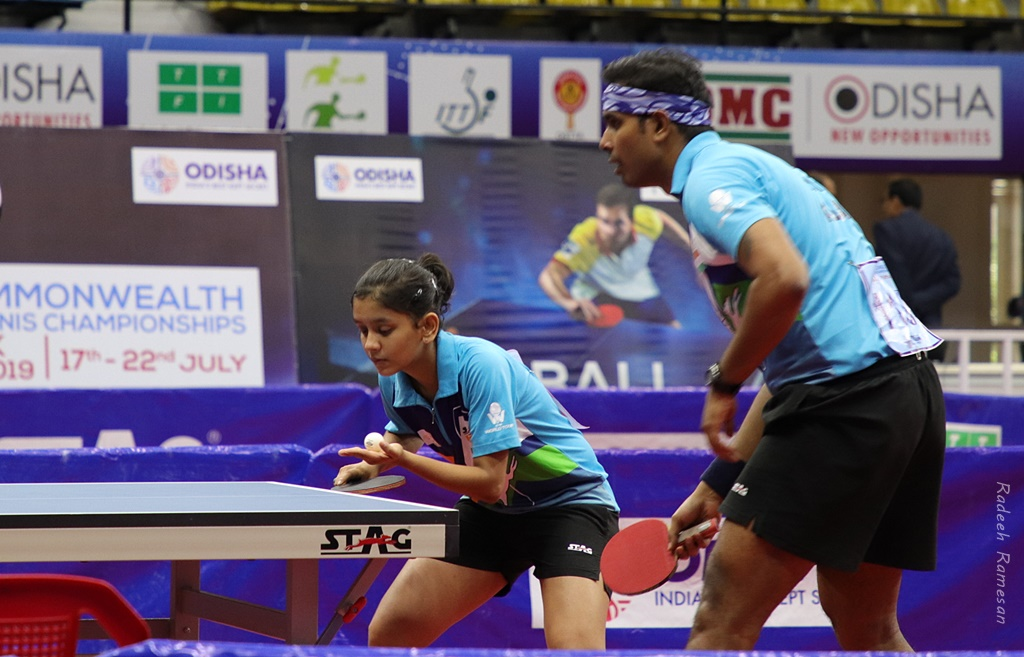
Participants of 2019 Commonwealth Table Tennis championships

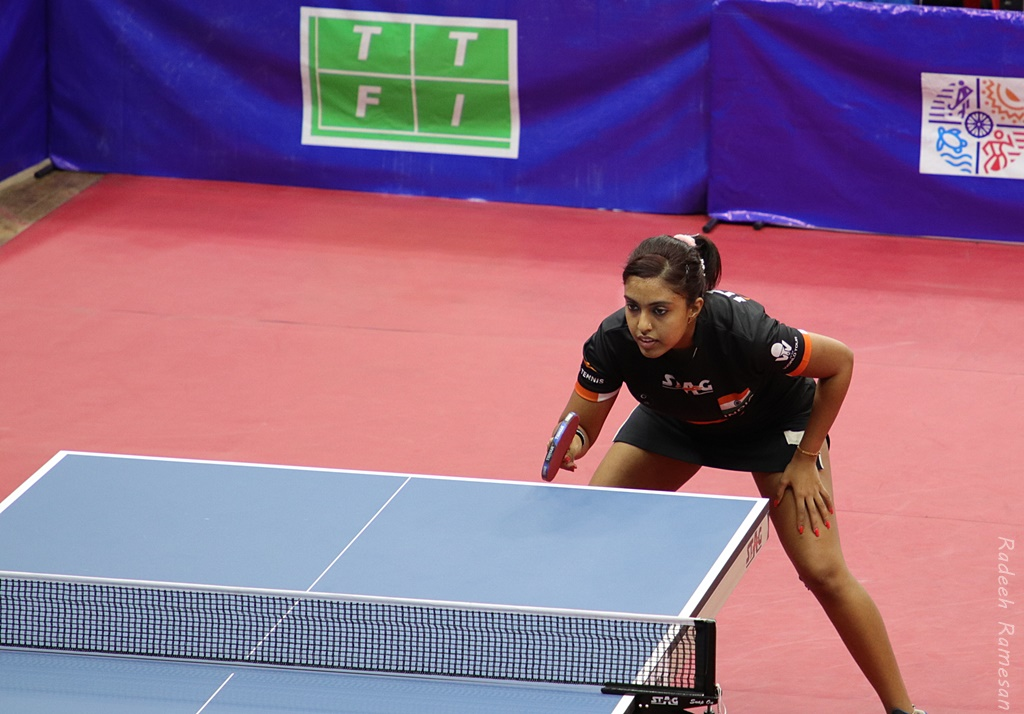
Participants of 2019 Commonwealth Table Tennis championships

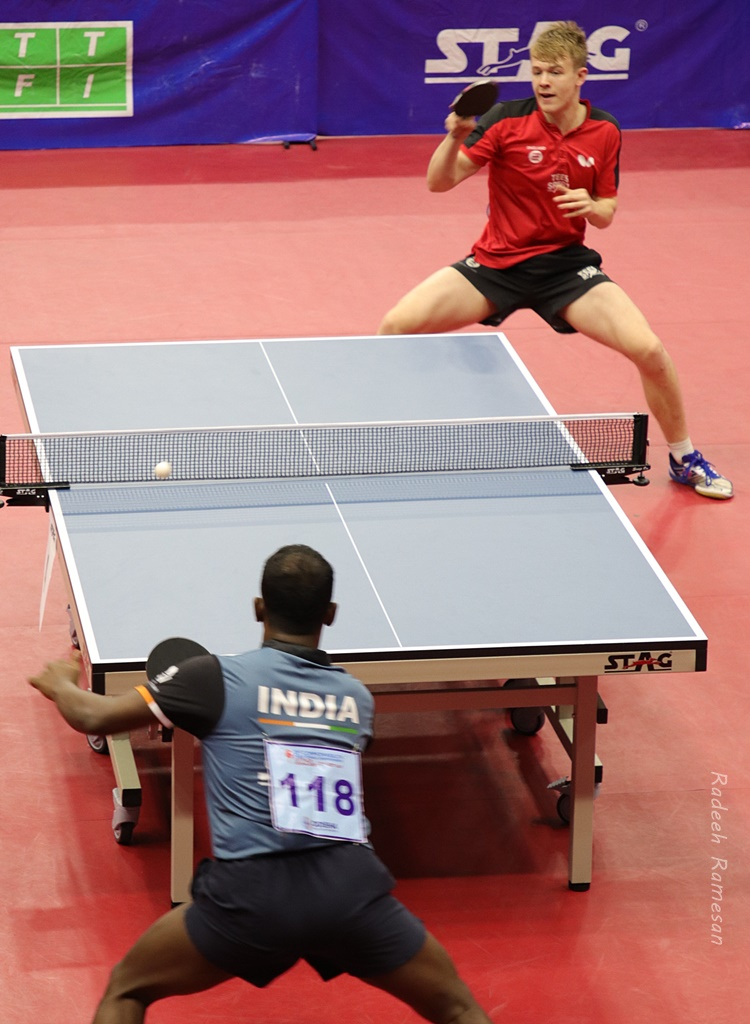
Participants of 2019 Commonwealth Table Tennis championships

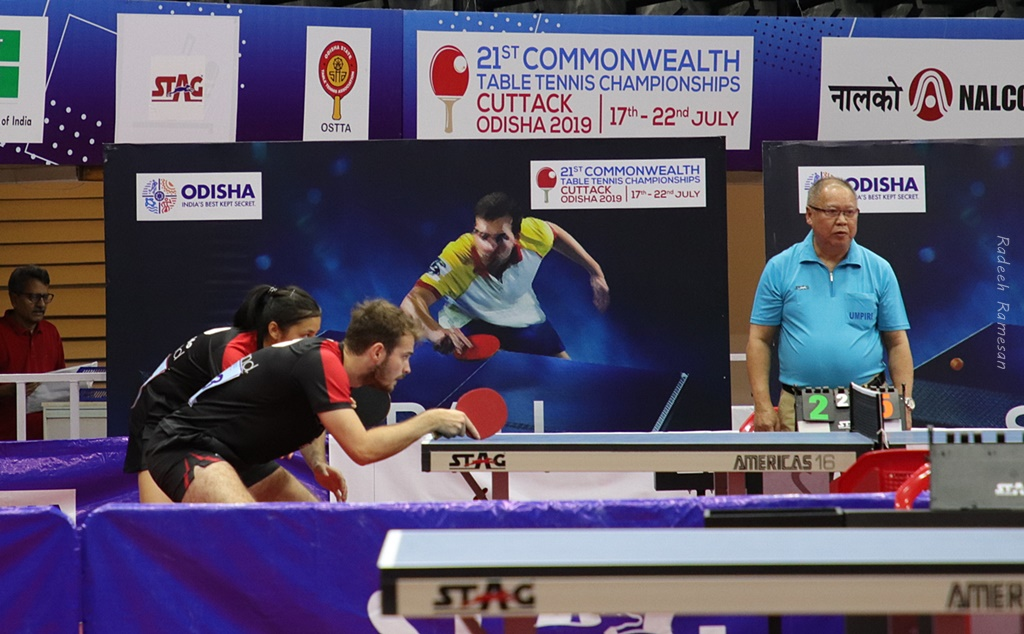
Participants of 2019 Commonwealth Table Tennis championships

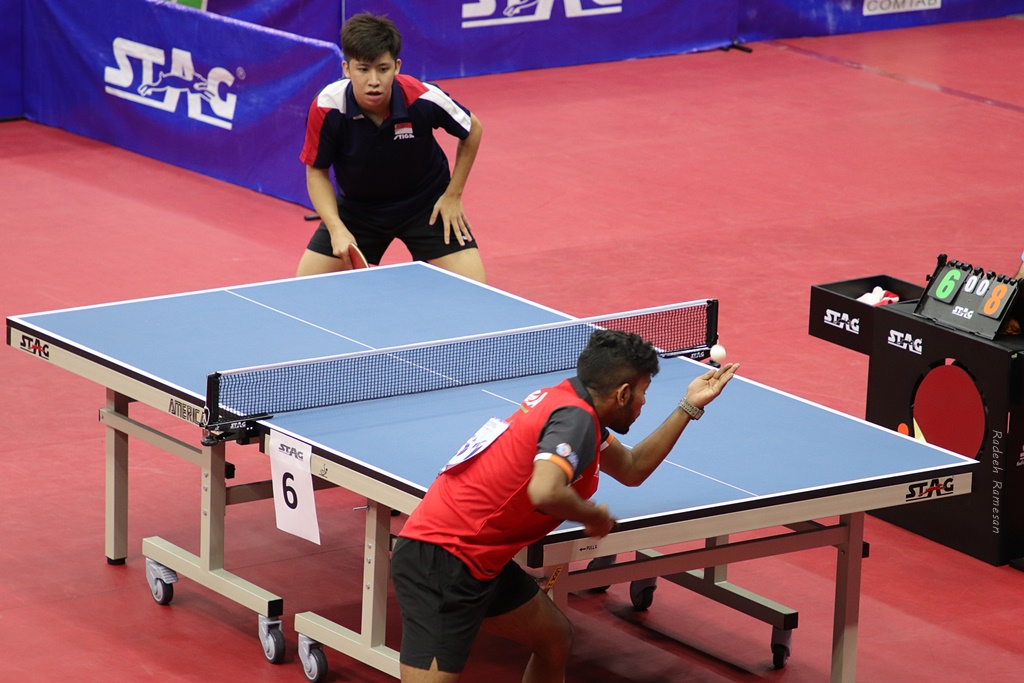
Participants of 2019 Commonwealth Table Tennis championships

== See also ==
- Table tennis at the Commonwealth Games
