= Table tennis at the 2002 Asian Games – Mixed doubles =

Mixed doubles at the 2002 Asian Games
- Venue: Dongchun Gymnasium
- Dates: 5–6 October 2002
- Competitors: 42 from 13 nations

Medalists
gold medal	Cheung Yuk; Tie Ya Na	Hong Kong
silver medal	Ryu Seung-min; Ryu Ji-hye	South Korea
bronze medal	Wang Liqin; Wang Nan	China
bronze medal	Ma Lin; Li Nan	China

The mixed doubles table tennis event was part of the table tennis programme and took place between October 5 and 6, at the Dongchun Gymnasium, Ulsan.

== Schedule ==
All times are Korea Standard Time (UTC+09:00)

Date	Time	Event
Saturday, 5 October 2002	17:00	1st round
Saturday, 5 October 2002	17:45	2nd round
Sunday, 6 October 2002	14:00	Quarterfinals
Sunday, 6 October 2002	14:45	Semifinals
Sunday, 6 October 2002	16:30	Final

== Results ==
=== Finals ===
Semifinals									Final
1	Wang Liqin (CHN); Wang Nan (CHN)	7	7	14	13	11	9	11
4	Cheung Yuk (HKG); Tie Ya Na (HKG)	11	11	12	11	8	11	13	4	Cheung Yuk (HKG); Tie Ya Na (HKG)	12	5	10	11	11	14	11
3	Ryu Seung-min (KOR); Ryu Ji-hye (KOR)	11	6	11	11	14	11		3	Ryu Seung-min (KOR); Ryu Ji-hye (KOR)	14	11	12	8	7	12	3
2	Ma Lin (CHN); Li Nan (CHN)	9	11	5	6	16	3

=== Top half ===
==== Section 1 ====
1st round				2nd round						Quarterfinals
				1	Wang Liqin (CHN); Wang Nan (CHN)	15	11	8	11
Enkhbatyn Lkhagvasüren (MGL); Batsaikhany Batkhishig (MGL)	5	8	8		Pak Won-chol (PRK); Kim Hyang-mi (PRK)	13	7	11	7
Pak Won-chol (PRK); Kim Hyang-mi (PRK)	11	11	11							1	Wang Liqin (CHN); Wang Nan (CHN)	11	11	11	11
										5	Oh Sang-eun (KOR); Kim Moo-kyo (KOR)	7	13	5	8
					Cai Xiaoli (SIN); Zhang Xueling (SIN)	6	7	7
				5	Oh Sang-eun (KOR); Kim Moo-kyo (KOR)	11	11	11

==== Section 2 ====
1st round	2nd round							Quarterfinals
	8	Chang Yen-shu (TPE); Lu Yun-feng (TPE)	14	5	11	4	8
		Akira Kito (JPN); Mikie Takahashi (JPN)	12	11	5	11	11
									Akira Kito (JPN); Mikie Takahashi (JPN)	9	8	7
								4	Cheung Yuk (HKG); Tie Ya Na (HKG)	11	11	11
		Farjad Saif (PAK); Ghazala Rohi (PAK)	1	3	5
	4	Cheung Yuk (HKG); Tie Ya Na (HKG)	11	11	11

=== Bottom half ===
==== Section 3 ====
1st round	2nd round					Quarterfinals
	3	Ryu Seung-min (KOR); Ryu Ji-hye (KOR)	11	11	13
		Koji Sanada (JPN); Satoko Kishida (JPN)	6	8	11
						3	Ryu Seung-min (KOR); Ryu Ji-hye (KOR)	11	11	13
							Kim Song-chol (PRK); Kim Hyon-hui (PRK)	8	9	11
		Kim Song-chol (PRK); Kim Hyon-hui (PRK)	11	11	11
	7	Duan Yong Jun (SIN); Li Jiawei (SIN)	9	7	9

==== Section 4 ====
1st round	2nd round					Quarterfinals
	6	Ko Lai Chak (HKG); Lau Sui Fei (HKG)	11	11	11
		Lkhagvadorjiin Altantulga (MGL); Möngöntsetsegiin Batjargal (MGL)	1	3	1
						6	Ko Lai Chak (HKG); Lau Sui Fei (HKG)	10	2	8
						2	Ma Lin (CHN); Li Nan (CHN)	12	11	11
		Chuang Chih-yuan (TPE); Huang Yi-hua (TPE)	9	10	8
	2	Ma Lin (CHN); Li Nan (CHN)	11	12	11
