= Xu Yan (table tennis) =

Singaporean table tennis player

Personal information
- Nationality: Singapore
- Born: 22 January 1985 (age 41) Shanghai, China
- Height: 1.65 m (5 ft 5 in)
- Weight: 53 kg (117 lb; 8.3 st)

Sport
- Sport: Table tennis
Medal record
Women's Table Tennis
Representing Singapore
Commonwealth Games
Gold medal – first place	2006 Melbourne	Women's team
Silver medal – second place	2006 Melbourne	Doubles
Bronze medal – third place	2006 Melbourne	Singles
Southeast Asian Games
Gold medal – first place	2003 Vietnam	Women's team
Gold medal – first place	2005 Manila	Women's team
Silver medal – second place	2005 Manila	Doubles

Xu Yan (born 22 January 1985) is a Singaporean table tennis player.

== Career ==
In 2003, Xu took part in the 2003 SEA Games and won the women's team event with Li Jiawei, Jing Junhong, Zhang Xueling, Tan Paey Fern. The same team won the Team of the Year at the Singapore Sports Awards 2004.

In 2004, Xu competed at the 2004 Commonwealth Table Tennis Championships and defeated fellow Singaporean Zhang to win the gold medal in the women's singles event. She also won the women's team gold medal with Li, Jing, Zhang and Tan.

In 2005, Xu with her same table tennis team won the meritorious award for a sport team and she also won the meritorious award for individual at the Singapore Sports Awards 2005.

At the 2005 SEA Games, Xu won the women's team event with Li, Zhang, Tan and Jenn Lim. Xu and Tan lost the women's doubles gold medal match to Indonesia 2–3 and won the silver medal.

Xu competed at the 2006 Commonwealth Games where she won a gold medal in the women's team event, a silver medal in the women's doubles event and a bronze in the women's singles event.

== Personal life ==
Xu was born on 22 January 1985 in Shanghai, China and came to Singapore in 1998.

Initially rejected by Ministry of Community Development and Sports of Singapore for less than two years of being a Singapore permanent resident, Xu's application to be a Singaporean citizen was approved in late 2003.

In 2006, Xu returned to Shanghai, citing a need of a change of environment.
