= Richard Gonzales (table tennis) =

Filipino table tennis player

Personal information
- Full name: Richard Pugoy Gonzales
- Nationality: Filipino
- Born: March 31, 1971 (age 55)
- Height: 1.73 m (5 ft 8 in)
- Weight: 64 kg (141 lb; 10.1 st)

Sport
- Sport: Table tennis
Medal record
Men's Table Tennis
Representing Philippines
| Event | 1st | 2nd | 3rd |
|---|---|---|---|
| World Championship of Ping Pong | 0 | 0 | 1 |
| Southeast Asian Games | 0 | 3 | 9 |
| South East Asian Championships | 1 | 0 | 0 |
| Total | 1 | 3 | 10 |
World Championship of Ping Pong
| Bronze medal – third place | 2014 London | Singles |
Southeast Asian Games
| Silver medal – second place | 2005 Manila | Singles |
| Silver medal – second place | 2015 Singapore | Singles |
| Silver medal – second place | 2021 Vietnam | Doubles |
| Bronze medal – third place | 1999 Bandar Seri Begawan | Singles |
| Bronze medal – third place | 2005 Manila | Team |
| Bronze medal – third place | 2009 Vientiane | Singles |
| Bronze medal – third place | 2011 Jakarta-Palembang | Doubles |
| Bronze medal – third place | 2013 Naypyidaw | Singles |
| Bronze medal – third place | 2017 Kuala Lumpur | Singles |
| Bronze medal – third place | 2019 Philippines | Singles |
| Bronze medal – third place | 2023 Cambodia | Doubles |
| Bronze medal – third place | 2025 Thailand | Team |
South East Asian Championships
| Gold medal – first place | 2005 | Singles |

Richard Pugoy Gonzales (born March 31, 1971) is a Filipino table tennis player and the No. 1 ranked player in the Philippines as of January 2014.

== Career ==
Gonzales is a multiple medalist at the Southeast Asian Games in Table Tennis, winning Silver both at the 2005 and the recently concluded 2015 edition, and bronze at the 2009 and 2013 editions all in Men's Singles Event. He won bronze along with Rodel Valle at the men's double event of the 2011 edition. Along with John Russel Misal, Gonzales clinched a silver at the men's double of the 2021 edition.

Aside from the Southeast Asian Games, he also reigned at the 2005 Southeast Asian Table Tennis Championship winning Gold.

Outside Southeast Asia, Gonzales has represented the Philippines at the 2014 World Championship of Ping Pong winning bronze after bowing out to Maxim Shmyrev in the semifinal. Gonzales along with Ian Lariba were the Philippines' representatives at the 2014 World Team Table Tennis Championships.
