= Table tennis at the 2002 Asian Games – Men's singles =

Men's singles at the 2002 Asian Games
- Venue: Dongchun Gymnasium
- Dates: 8–9 October 2002
- Competitors: 29 from 16 nations

Medalists
gold medal	Wang Liqin	China
silver medal	Chuang Chih-yuan	Chinese Taipei
bronze medal	Oh Sang-eun	South Korea
bronze medal	Kong Linghui	China

The men's singles table tennis event was part of the table tennis programme and took place between October 8 and 9, at the Dongchun Gymnasium, Ulsan.

== Schedule ==
All times are Korea Standard Time (UTC+09:00)

Date	Time	Event
Tuesday, 8 October 2002	14:00	1st round
Tuesday, 8 October 2002	17:00	2nd round
Tuesday, 8 October 2002	18:30	Quarterfinals
Wednesday, 9 October 2002	15:00	Semifinals
Wednesday, 9 October 2002	17:30	Final

== Results ==
Legend

- WO — Won by walkover

=== Finals ===
Semifinals							Final
1	Wang Liqin (CHN)	11	9	11	11	11
6	Oh Sang-eun (KOR)	6	11	8	5	6	1	Wang Liqin (CHN)	11	12	13	11
3	Chuang Chih-yuan (TPE)	11	17	11	11		3	Chuang Chih-yuan (TPE)	4	10	11	7
2	Kong Linghui (CHN)	6	15	4	4

=== Top half ===
==== Section 1 ====
1st round
Zafar Shadiev (TJK)	8	9	3	7
Vũ Mạnh Cường (VIE)	11	11	11	11
Kim Song-hui (PRK)	11	11	11	11
Lkhagvadorjiin Altantulga (MGL)	3	3	6	6
Antonio Sales (TMP)	2	4	1	2
8	Ko Lai Chak (HKG)	11	11	11	11

2nd round
1	Wang Liqin (CHN)	11	11	13	11
Vũ Mạnh Cường (VIE)	3	4	11	5
Kim Song-hui (PRK)	5	5	9	11	11	11
8	Ko Lai Chak (HKG)	11	11	11	9	7	13

Quarterfinals
1	Wang Liqin (CHN)	12	11	11	11
8	Ko Lai Chak (HKG)	10	9	5	7

==== Section 2 ====
1st round
6	Oh Sang-eun (KOR)	11	11	11	11
Farjad Saif (PAK)	8	1	9	1
Hamad Al-Hammadi (QAT)	7	6	9	7
Toshio Tasaki (JPN)	11	11	11	11
Cai Xiaoli (SIN)	11	11	12	11
Mansour Al-Enazi (KUW)	1	9	10	4
Subhajit Saha (IND)	5	7	10	3
4	Chiang Peng-lung (TPE)	11	11	12	11

2nd round
6	Oh Sang-eun (KOR)	13	7	11	11	10	9	11
Toshio Tasaki (JPN)	11	11	3	7	12	11	9
Cai Xiaoli (SIN)	6	4	9	3
4	Chiang Peng-lung (TPE)	11	11	11	11

Quarterfinals
6	Oh Sang-eun (KOR)	11	11	13	7	11
4	Chiang Peng-lung (TPE)	4	8	11	11	7

=== Bottom half ===
==== Section 3 ====
1st round
Ahmad Mandani (KUW)	2	6	5	2
Pak Won-chol (PRK)	11	11	11	11
Soumyadeep Roy (IND)	11	2	11	13	11	11
Sükheegiin Galbadrakh (MGL)	8	11	7	15	3	9
Eyad Makanai (JOR)
5	Kim Taek-soo (KOR)	W	O

2nd round
3	Chuang Chih-yuan (TPE)	11	11	11	11
Pak Won-chol (PRK)	3	3	5	5
Soumyadeep Roy (IND)	4	8	6	11	4
5	Kim Taek-soo (KOR)	11	11	11	8	11

Quarterfinals
3	Chuang Chih-yuan (TPE)	7	11	8	6	11	11	11
5	Kim Taek-soo (KOR)	11	8	11	11	9	5	6

==== Section 4 ====
1st round
7	Cheung Yuk (HKG)	11	11	11	11	10	11
Đoàn Kiến Quốc (VIE)	7	13	7	9	12	4
Sirojiddin Ismoilov (TJK)	5	7	7	8
Duan Yong Jun (SIN)	11	11	11	11
Koji Matsushita (JPN)	11	11	11	11
Khalid Al-Kuwari (QAT)	5	5	5	2

2nd round
7	Cheung Yuk (HKG)	9	11	11	5	11	11
Duan Yong Jun (SIN)	11	7	6	11	7	4
Koji Matsushita (JPN)	3	11	9	6	14	11	6
2	Kong Linghui (CHN)	11	8	11	11	12	6	11

Quarterfinals
7	Cheung Yuk (HKG)	10	2	4	5
2	Kong Linghui (CHN)	12	11	11	11
