= Table tennis at the 2006 Commonwealth Games =

Table Tennis at the 2006 Commonwealth Games
- Venue: Melbourne Sports and Aquatic Centre
- Location: Melbourne, Australia
- Dates: 16 to 26 March 2006

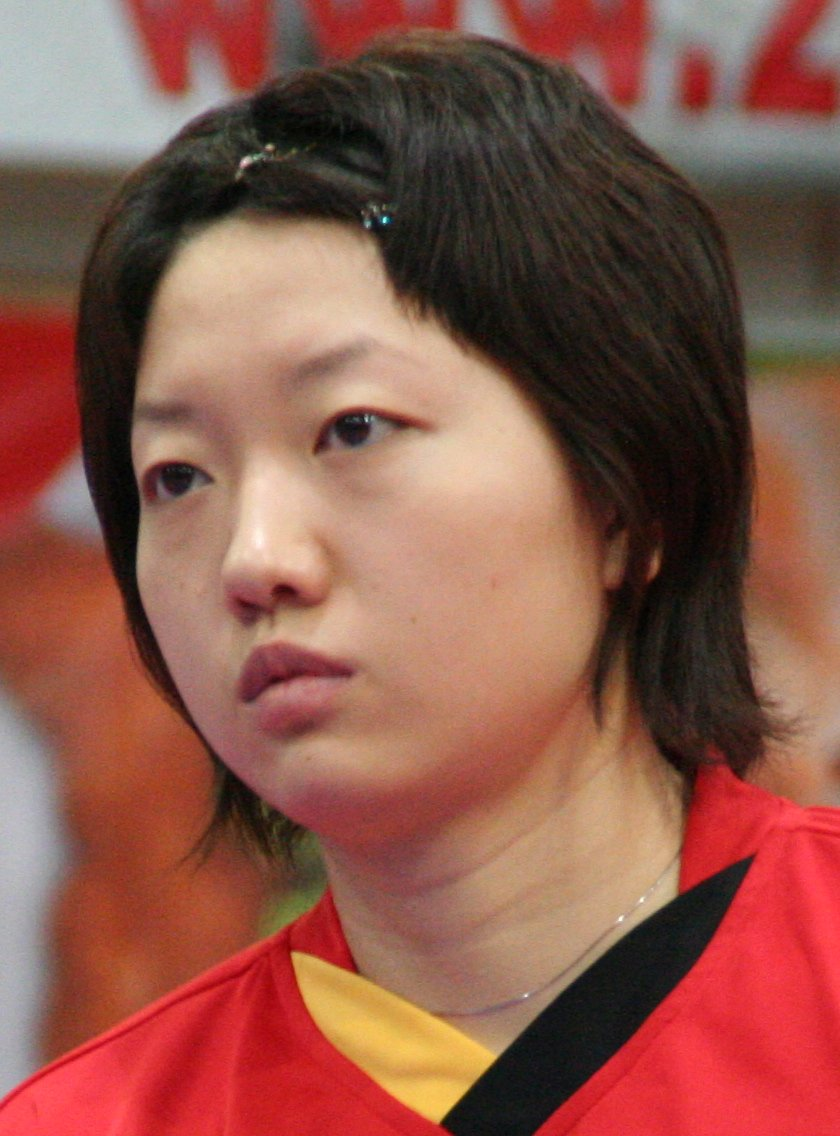
Li Jiawei claimed gold in the women's doubles and two silvers in the singles and mixed doubles

Table tennis at the 2006 Commonwealth Games was the second appearance of Table tennis at the Commonwealth Games. Competition was held in Melbourne, Australia, from 15 to 26 March 2006 and featured contests in eight events.

The events were held at the Melbourne Sports and Aquatic Centre.

Singapore topped the table tennis medal table by virtue of winning four gold medals.

== Medal table ==
* Host nation (Australia)

Rank	Nation	Gold	Silver	Bronze	Total
1	Singapore	4	4	3	11
2	India	2	0	1	3
3	Nigeria	1	1	2	4
4	England	1	1	1	3
5	Australia*	0	2	1	3
Totals (5 entries)		8	8	8	24

== Medallists ==
Event	Gold	Silver	Bronze
Men's singles	Sharath Kamal; India	William Henzell; Australia	Segun Toriola; Nigeria
Women's singles	Zhang Xueling; Singapore	Li Jiawei; Singapore	Yan Xu; Singapore
Men's doubles	Monday Merotohun and Segun Toriola; Nigeria	Andrew Baggaley and Andrew Rushton; England	Cai Xiaoli and Yang Zi; Singapore
Women's doubles	Li Jiawei and Zhang Xueling; Singapore	Sharon Tan and Yan Xu; Singapore	Lay Jian Fang and Miao Miao; Australia
Mixed doubles	Zhang Xueling and Yang Zi; Singapore	Li Jiawei and Cai Xiao Li; Singapore	Tan Paey Fern and Jason Ho; Singapore
Men's team	India	Singapore	Nigeria
Women's team	Singapore	Australia	India
Women's EAD Singles	Susan Gilroy; England	Faith Obiora; Nigeria	Catherine Mitton; England

== Results ==
=== Men's singles ===
Round of 16
(India) Sharath Kamal	7	11	12	11	11
(England) Andrew Rushton	11	6	10	6	5
(Singapore) Cai Xiaoli	11	9	11	14	11
(New Zealand) Peter Jackson	9	11	7	12	1
(Nigeria) Segun Toriola	7	9	11	3	11	11	11
(Wales) Ryan Jenkins	11	11	7	11	4	9	9
(Canada) Bence Csaba	11	9	11	11	11
(Australia) Russ Lavale	8	11	9	6	9
(Australia) William Henzell	5	13	7	9	11	11
(Malta) Simon Gerada	11	11	11	11	8	9
(Singapore) Yang Zi	11	5	12	11	11
(India) Subhajit Saha	5	11	10	8	7
(Wales) Adam Robertson	11	11	11	11
(Singapore) Jason Ho	4	6	6	4
(England) Alan Cooke	11	11	9	6	11	11
(Nigeria) Kazeem Nasiru	6	8	11	11	9	7

Quarter finals
(India) Kamal	11	13	11	5	7	11
(Singapore) Cai Xiaoli	3	11	8	11	11	7
(Nigeria) Toriola	9	11	11	11	11
(Canada) Csaba	11	6	8	5	8
(Australia) Henzell	11	11	11	11
(Singapore) Yang Zi	7	6	4	5
(Wales) Robertson	10	13	11	7	13	11	11
(England) Cooke	12	11	4	11	15	9	7

Semi finals
(India) Kamal	11	15	11	11
(Nigeria) Toriola	6	13	8	3
(Australia) Henzell	11	11	13	11
(Wales) Robertson	5	9	11	2

Final
(India) Kamal (gold)	11	8	5	11	11	7	11
(Australia) Henzell (silver)	5	11	11	8	8	11	8
Bronze Medal Match
(Nigeria) Toriola (bronze)	7	11	11	8	4	11	11
(Wales) Robertson	11	3	8	11	11	9	4

=== Women's singles ===
Round of 16
(Singapore) Zhang Xueling	11	11	13	10	11
(Malaysia) Sock Khim Ng	7	8	11	12	7
(New Zealand) Karen Jinli	11	9	12	11	16	7	11
(Australia) May Cho	7	11	10	9	18	11	6
(Australia) Miao Miao	11	7	11	11	13
(India) Poulomi Ghatak	9	11	5	8	11
(Singapore) Sharon Tan	11	11	11	7	11
(Malaysia) Soo Jin Chiu	5	4	6	11	6
(Singapore) Li Jiawei	11	11	11	11
(England) Joanna Parker	2	5	5	4
(Canada) Zhang Mo	11	14	11	9	11	6	11
(Australia) Jian Fang Lay	5	12	13	11	9	11	3
(Singapore) Yan Xu	12	12	11	11	11	11	12
(India) Mouma Das	14	10	13	4	13	2	10
(Australia) Stephanie Sang	11	11	11	9	11
(Malaysia) Lee Wei Beh	5	7	8	11	8

Quarter finals
(Singapore) Zhang Xueling	11	11	11	9	11
(New Zealand) Karen Li	7	7	5	11	7
(Australia) Miao Miao	11	8	12	11	6	11
(Singapore) Tan	11	11	10	5	11	8
(Singapore) Li Jiawei	11	11	11	11
(Canada) Zhang Mo	8	9	9	9
(Singapore) Yan Xu	11	11	11	11
(Australia) Sang	6	7	5	8

Semi finals
(Singapore) Zhang Xueling	11	11	11	9	12
(Australia) Miao Miao	6	8	6	11	10
(Singapore) Jiawei	11	6	11	11	11
(Singapore) Yan Xu	7	11	7	6	7

Final
(Singapore) Zhang Xueling (gold)	6	11	11	2	7	11	11
(Singapore) Li Jiawei (silver)	11	3	5	11	11	7	2
Bronze Medal Match
(Singapore) Yan Xu (bronze)	11	11	11	11
(Australia) Miao Miao	6	7	5	7

=== Men's doubles ===
Quarterfinals
(Nigeria) Segun Toriola (Nigeria) Monday Merotohun	11	11	9	11
(Australia) William Henzell (Australia) David Zalcberg	1	8	11	6
(England) Alan Cooke (England) Paul Drinkhall	11	7	12	11
(Wales) Adam Robertson (Wales) Ryan Jenkins	5	11	10	9
(England) Andrew Baggaley (England) Andrew Rushton	11	10	11	6	11
(India) Sharath Kamal (India) Soumyadeep Roy	8	12	7	11	4
(Singapore) Cai Xiaoli (Singapore) Yang Zi	11	11	11
(Canada) Bence Csbaa (Canada) Faazil Kassam	5	9	6

Semifinals
(Nigeria) Toriola & Merotohun	11	11	11
(England) Cooke & Drinkhall	6	8	6
(England) Baggaley & Rushton	5	11	9	11	11
(Singapore) Cai & Yang Zi	11	6	11	6	6

Final
(Nigeria) Toriola & Merohotun (gold)	11	11	11
(England) Baggaley & Rushton (silver)	4	9	7
Bronze Medal Match
(England) Cooke & Drinkhall	5	8	11	11	7
(Singapore) Cai & Yang Zi (bronze)	11	11	7	9	11

=== Women's doubles ===
Quarterfinals
(Singapore) Li Jiawei (Singapore) Zhang Xueling	11	8	11	11
(England) Joanna Parker (England) Kelly Sibley	8	11	9	5
(New Zealand) Karen Jinli (New Zealand) Annie Yang	9	15	12	11	12
(India) Mouma Das (India) Poulami Ghatak	11	13	10	13	10
(Singapore) Sharon Tan (Singapore) Yan Xu	11	11	11
(Mauritius) Sharon Knubley (Mauritius) Rabia Patel	3	6	3
(Australia) Miao Miao (Australia) Lay Jian Fang	15	11	11	11
(Malaysia) Sock Khim Ng (Malaysia) Lee Wei Beh	17	5	4	9

Semifinals
(Singapore) Li Jiawei & Zhang Xueling	11	11	11
(New Zealand) Jinli & Yang	8	5	5
(Singapore) Tan & Yan Xu	11	11	9	5	11
(Australia) Miao Miao & Lay	5	6	11	11	5

Final
(Singapore) Li Jiawei & Zhang Xueling (gold)	11	11	11
(Singapore) Tan & Yan Xu (silver)	9	2	9
Bronze Medal Match
(New Zealand) Jinli & Yang	11	11	11	8	10
(Australia) Lay & Miao Miao (bronze)	5	9	13	11	12

=== Mixed doubles ===
Quarterfinals
(Singapore) Yang Zi (Singapore) Zhang Xueling	11	11	11
(Malaysia) Koon Wah Chan (Malaysia) Sook Khim Ng	8	8	7
(Singapore) Jason Ho (Singapore) Sharon Tan	8	11	9	11	11
(Malaysia) Shakirin Ibrahim (Malaysia) Lee Wei Beh	11	7	11	8	1
(Singapore) Cai Xiaoli (Singapore) Li Jiawei	11	11	11
(India) Soumyadeep Roy (India) Mouma Das	2	5	3
(Australia) Russ Lavale (Australia) Miao Miao	8	3	11	11	11
(Nigeria) Segun Toriola (Nigeria) Olufunke Oshonaike	11	11	7	8	9

Semifinals
(Singapore) Zi Yang & Xueling	11	11	11
(Singapore) Ho & Tan	3	3	7
(Singapore) Cai & Jiawei	11	10	11	11
(Australia) Lavalle & Miao Miao	7	12	1	7

Final
(Singapore) Yang Zi & Xueling (gold)	11	11	6	11
(Singapore) Cai & Jiawei (silver)	7	5	11	4
Bronze Medal Match
(Singapore) Ho & Tan (bronze)	15	13	9	11	11
(Australia) Lavelle & Miao Miao	17	11	11	9	9

=== Men's team ===
Pool A

Team	Wins	Losses
Singapore	6	0
Canada	5	1
Trinidad and Tobago	3	3
Jamaica	3	3
Barbados	3	3
Fiji	1	5
Malawi	0	6

Pool B

Team	Wins	Losses
Nigeria	6	0
Malaysia	5	1
New Zealand	4	2
South Africa	3	3
Mauritius	2	4
Maldives	1	5
Vanuatu	0	6

Pool C

Team	Wins	Losses
Wales	6	0
England	5	1
Guyana	3	3
Sri Lanka	3	3
Pakistan	3	3
Kenya	1	5
Tuvalu	0	6

Pool D

Team	Wins	Losses
India	5	0
Australia	4	1
Northern Ireland	3	2
Ghana	2	3
Saint Vincent and the Grenadines	1	4
Kiribati	0	5

Final Rounds

Quarter-finals
Singapore	3
Australia	2
Malaysia	1
Wales	3
India	3
Canada	1
England	1
Nigeria	3

Semi-finals
Singapore	3
Wales	0
India	3
Nigeria	2

Final
Singapore	2
India	3

==== Gold medal match ====
Team One	Team Two	Score
India	Singapore	3-2

Player One	Player Two	Score
Soumyadeep Roy	Yang Zi	5–11, 3–11, 8–11
Sharath Kamal	Cai Xiaoli	11–9, 9–11, 11–3, 7–11, 8–11
Subhajit Saha	Jason Ho	10–12, 11–5, 11–7, 12–10
Sharath Kamal	Yang Zi	5–11, 11–6, 6–11, 11–7, 11–7
Soumyadeep Roy	Cai Xiaoli	11–6, 11–8, 7–11, 11–6

==== Bronze medal match ====
Team One	Team Two	Score
Nigeria	Wales	3-0

Player One	Player Two	Score
Kazeem Nosiru	Adam Robertson	9-11, 11-7, 11-8, 11-9
Segun Toriola	Ryan Jenkins	11-6, 11-7, 11-8
Monday Merotohun	Stephen Jenkins	12-10 13-11 11-6

=== Women's team ===
Pool A

Team	Wins	Losses
Singapore	3	0
Canada	2	1
New Zealand	1	2
Uganda	0	3

Pool B

Team	Wins	Losses
Australia	4	0
Nigeria	3	1
England	2	2
Sri Lanka	1	3
Vanuatu	0	4

Pool C

Team	Wins	Losses
Malaysia	4	0
India	3	1
Wales	2	2
Mauritius	1	3
Fiji	0	4

Final Rounds

Quarter-finals
Singapore	3
Wales	0
Nigeria	1
India	3
Malaysia	1
Canada	3
New Zealand	2
Australia	3

Semi-finals
Singapore	3
India	0
Canada	2
Australia	3

Final
Singapore	3
Australia	0

==== Gold medal match ====
Team One	Team Two	Score
Singapore	Australia	3-0

Player One	Player Two	Score
Zhang Xueling	Miao Miao	11-3, 11-8, 11-8
Li Jiawei	Stephanie Sang	11-5, 10-12, 11-7, 11-9
Sharon Tan	Jian Fang Lay	3-11, 11-9, 11-6, 7-11, 13-11

==== Bronze medal match ====
Team One	Team Two	Score
India	Canada	3-2

Player One	Player Two	Score
Poulomi Ghatak	Hong Guan Xu	13-11, 11-7, 12-10
Mouma Das	Zhang Mo	11-9, 13-11, 11-8
Nandita Saha	Sara Yuen	1-11, 11-4, 12-10, 11-7
Poulomi Ghatak	Zhang Mo	11-7, 11-8, 11-5
Mouma Das	Hong Guan Xu	5-11, 11-7, 11-3, 8-11, 11-5

== See also ==
- Table tennis at the Commonwealth Games
- Commonwealth Table Tennis Championships
