= 2014 World Championship of Ping Pong =

Table tennis competition

Coordinates: 51.594°N 0.130°W

The 2014 World Championship of Ping Pong was a table tennis tournament.

== Format ==
The tournament used standardized sand paper covered paddles, as opposed to the paddles used in table tennis events that have rubber surfaces with optional sponge underneath for more spin and speed. This ping pong tournament was held from 4 January 2014 to 5 January 2014 at the Great Hall in Alexandra Palace. The tournament was organized by the sport event promotion company Matchroom Sport. Russian Maxim Shmyrev won the tournament for the third year in a row.

== Format ==
The format of the tournament consisted of sixty-four of the best ping pong players. The remaining thirty-two competed in a knockout form for the championship.

1st Round
Maxim Shmyrev	2
Martin Groenewold	0
Cyril Cibiel	2
Ding Yi	1
Kazeem Adeleke	2
Oriol Monzo	1
Ashley Stokes	0
Gavin Rumgay	2
Richard Gonzales	2
Wojciech Kolodziejczyk	0
Colum Slevin	1
Alexander Flemming	2
Dimitrij Levenko	1
Marc Duran	2
Dean Cundy	0
Christopher Doran	2
Ilija Lupulesku	2
Reginald Kraaijenbring	0
Egle Adomelyte	2
Ferenc Turei	0
Denis Neale	0
Paul McCreery	2
Dimitri Popov	0
Andrew Baggaley	2
Qing Wang	2
Robert Ross	0
Ksenia Tulenkova	1
Lubomir Pistej	2
Andrew Rushton	2
Omkar Torgalkar	0
Jean-Michel Carquin	1
Vladislav Kutsenko	2

2nd Round
Maxim Shmyrev	2
Cyril Cibiel	0
Kazeem Adeleke	0
Gavin Rumgay	2
Richard Gonzales	2
Alexander Flemming	1
Marc Duran	0
Christopher Doran	2
Ilija Lupulesku	2
Egle Adomelyte	0
Paul McCreery	0
Andrew Baggaley	2
Qing Wang	0
Lubomir Pistej	2
Andrew Rushton	2
Vladislav Kutsenko	0

Quarterfinals
Maxim Shmyrev	2
Gavin Rumgay	1
Richard Gonzales	2
Christopher Doran	1
Ilija Lupulesku	2
Andrew Baggaley	0
Lubomir Pistej	0
Andrew Rushton	2

Semifinals
Maxim Shmyrev	2
Richard Gonzales	1
Ilija Lupulesku	2
Andrew Rushton	0

Finals
Maxim Shmyrev	3
Ilija Lupulesku	0
