= Andrew Baggaley =

British table tennis player (born 1983)

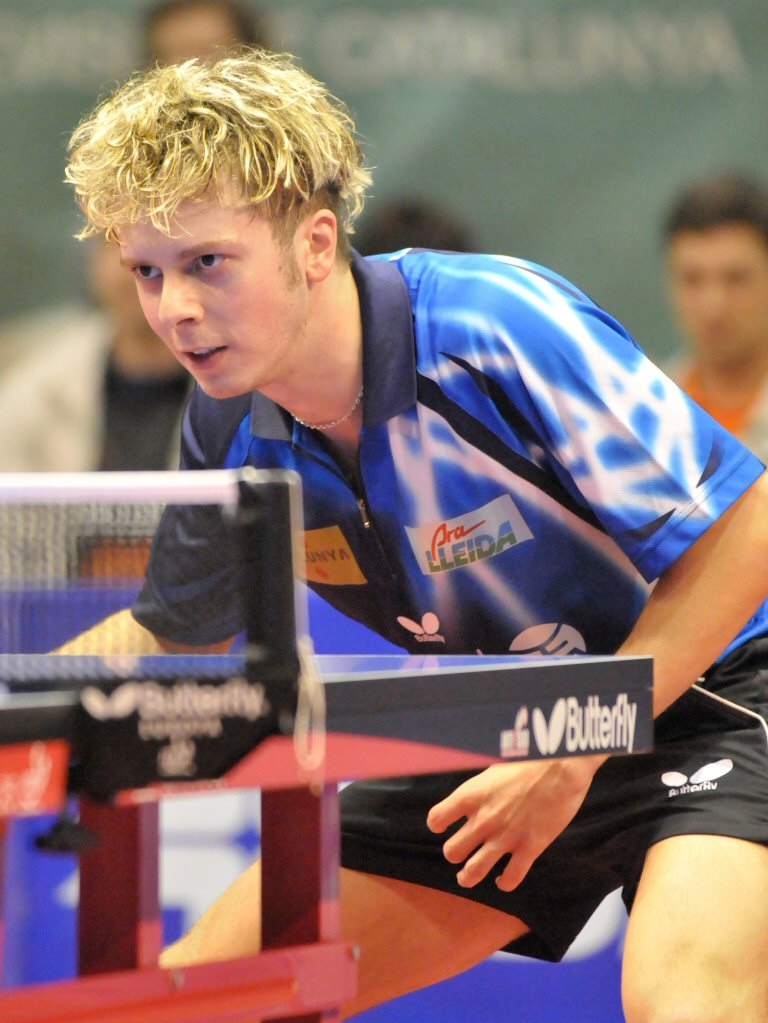
- Andrew Baggaley playing for DKV Borges

Personal information
- Nationality: England
- Born: 26 February 1983 (age 43)
- Height: 1.80 m (5 ft 11 in)
- Weight: 75 kg (165 lb; 11.8 st)

Sport
- Sport: Table tennis
- Playing style: Shakehand grip
Medal record
Commonwealth Games
Gold medal – first place	2002 Manchester	Men's Team
Gold medal – first place	2002 Manchester	Men's Doubles
Silver medal – second place	2006 Melbourne	Men's Doubles
Silver medal – second place	2010 Delhi	Men's Team
Silver medal – second place	2014 Glasgow	Men's Team
Bronze medal – third place	2010 Delhi	Men's Doubles
World Championship of Ping Pong
Gold medal – first place	2015 London	Singles
Gold medal – first place	2016 London	Singles
Gold medal – first place	2019 London	Singles
Gold medal – first place	2020 London	Singles

Andrew Baggaley (born 26 February 1983) is a professional table tennis player from Milton Keynes. He is England's leading table tennis medal winner of all time in the Commonwealth Games, winning two gold medals in Manchester, England (2002), 1 silver medal in Melbourne, Australia (2006), 1 silver and 1 bronze medal in Delhi, India (2010) and 1 silver in Glasgow, Great Britain.

== Early life and junior career ==
Baggaley was born in Northampton. He started playing the sport with his mother Yvonne in the back garden of the family home in Milton Keynes in the Summer of 1987 aged 4 and has been coached almost exclusively by his brother Stephen Baggaley throughout his career.

Andrew Baggaley became Britain’s youngest ever professional table tennis player by signing terms to play for Brussels-based Belgian National League team TTC Logis Auderghem aged 13 (1996). He has subsequently played in national leagues across Europe including Germany, Sweden and Spain.

Andrew Baggaley made his England Junior International début aged 12 in the European Cadet (Under 14) Six Nations Championships in Soham (1995), and went on to win European Youth Medals at both Cadet and Junior (Under 17) categories; England’s first medals at these prestigious events for almost a decade alongside the likes of David Melder. Baggaley has won 23 English National Junior titles and has been ranked England number 1 in every age group (Under 10,11,12,14,17,21). He also became the youngest ever British Men’s Singles Champion aged 15 when he won the British Home Countries Title in Oban, Scotland (1998).

== Senior career ==
He made his England Senior International début at the French Open in 1997 aged 14 and also represented England at the 44th World Table Tennis Championships in Manchester, England later that year.

Baggaley became England number 1 senior aged 20 (2003), the youngest at the time for 20 years.

He is a triple English Men’s Singles National Champion by winning the senior title in Sheffield in 2002, 2008 and 2010.

At the time, his 2002 victory aged just 19 was the youngest winner of the Men’s Singles National Title for 40 years and he is still only one of 3 teenage winners of the title.

== Notable wins ==
Baggaley has defeated many world-class players from both Europe and Asia including victories over Peter Karlsson (Sweden) and Jean-Michel Saive (Belgium) both former European Singles Champion, Chiang Peng-Lung (Chinese Taipei) the former Asian Singles Champion, Gao Ning (Singapore) the Asian Cup champion and Jörgen Persson (Sweden) the 1991 World Champion.

In November 2011 Andrew Baggaley officially became the highest-ranked British player on the ITTF ranking list with a World Ranking of 142.

== International tournament wins ==
Baggaley is England's leading table tennis medal winner of all time in the Commonwealth Games, winning two gold medals in Manchester, England (2002), 1 silver medal in Melbourne, Australia (2006), 1 silver and 1 bronze medal in Delhi, India (2010) and 1 silver in Glasgow, Great Britain. He is also World Champion 2015 of Ping Pong, after beating reigning champion Maxim Shmyrev in the semi-final and Alexander Fleming in the final. He also won the World Championship of Ping Pong in 2016, 2019, beating three previous champions on his way to the trophy, and 2020.

== Other roles ==
Andrew Baggaley was the Table Tennis motion capture actor for the Xbox 360 game Kinect Sports.

He was a Bid Ambassador for the London 2012 Olympics where he was selected to play in the Team GB Table Tennis team.

== See also ==
- List of England players at the World Team Table Tennis Championships
