= Yang Zi (table tennis) =

Chinese-born Singaporean table tennis player

Personal information
- Native name: 杨子
- Nationality: Singapore
- Born: 19 June 1984 (age 42) Beijing, China
- Height: 1.83 m (6 ft 0 in)
- Weight: 72 kg (159 lb; 11.3 st)

Sport
- Sport: Table tennis
- Playing style: Left-handed, shakehand grip
- Highest ranking: 21 (January 2008)
Medal record
Men's table tennis
Representing Singapore
Asian Championships
Gold medal – first place	2012 Macau	Doubles
Bronze medal – third place	2013 Busan	Doubles
Asian Games
Bronze medal – third place	2006 Doha	Mixed Doubles
Southeast Asian Games
Gold medal – first place	2005 Manila	Doubles
Gold medal – first place	2005 Manila	Team
Gold medal – first place	2005 Manila	Mixed Doubles
Gold medal – first place	2007 Korat	Doubles
Gold medal – first place	2007 Korat	Team
Gold medal – first place	2007 Korat	Mixed Doubles
Gold medal – first place	2009 Vientiane	Team
Gold medal – first place	2009 Vientiane	Mixed Doubles
Silver medal – second place	2009 Vientiane	Singles
Bronze medal – third place	2005 Manila	Singles
Bronze medal – third place	2009 Vientiane	Doubles
Commonwealth Games
Gold medal – first place	2006 Melbourne	Mixed Doubles
Gold medal – first place	2010 Delhi	Singles
Gold medal – first place	2010 Delhi	Team
Gold medal – first place	2010 Delhi	Mixed Doubles
Gold medal – first place	2014 Glasgow	Team
Silver medal – second place	2006 Melbourne	Team
Silver medal – second place	2010 Delhi	Doubles
Bronze medal – third place	2006 Melbourne	Doubles
Bronze medal – third place	2014 Glasgow	Doubles

Yang Zi (Chinese: 杨子; pinyin: Yáng Zǐ; born 19 June 1984, in Beijing, China) is a Chinese-born Singaporean former table tennis player.

== Career ==
Yang joined the Singapore Table Tennis Association under the Foreign Sports Talent Scheme in 2003 and became a Singapore citizen two years later in 2005. He had represented Singapore in many major events such as 15th Asian Games, 18th Commonwealth Games and 23rd SEA Games.

In 2005, Yang won 2 Pro Tour Men's Singles U21 titles and won the Pro Tour Grand Finals Men's Singles U21 title. He also won the silver medal in the Beijing Invitational. Later he also managed to clinch 3 gold medals in the 2005 Southeast Asian Games and 2 golds in the 2006 Commonwealth Games. During the world's second largest sports event, 15th Asian Games, Yang, together with partner Li Jiawei, won the bronze medal for the mixed doubles event. Yang and his doubles partner, Gao Ning, has also won many medals in the ITTF Pro Tour Events.

At the 2008 Summer Olympics, Yang made it to the 4th round losing to Zoran Primorac of Croatia by a score of 4–2, however managing to defeat Marcos Freitas(POR) and Chuang Chih-yuan(TPE) in the 2nd and 3rd rounds respectively.

At the 2012 Summer Olympics, Yang lost to Paul Drinkhall in the second round, but he fared much better in the team event, where Singapore reached the quarterfinals, where they lost to eventual gold medalists, China.

At the 2014 Commonwealth Games, Yang and Jian Zhan won the bronze medal in the men's doubles, defeating Drinkhall and Liam Pitchford of England in the bronze medal match. Yang also won the gold medal in the team event.

In 2017, Yang announced his retirement.

== Medals ==
Event	Medal	Date	Competition
2004
Men's Team	Gold	TBA	Tianjin Invitational Competition; Tianjin, People's Republic of China
U21 Boys' Singles	Silver	22 May 2004	ITTF Pro Tour Korea Open; Jeju City, Jeju-do, South Korea
U21 Boys' Singles	Bronze	18 September 2004	ITTF Pro Tour Volkswagen China Open; Changchun, People's Republic of China
U21 Boys' Singles	Bronze	25 September 2004	ITTF Pro Tour Japan Open; Kobe, Japan
2005
Men's singles	Bronze	TBA	Asian Cup; TBA, TBA
U21 Boys' Singles	Gold	18 June 2005	ITTF Pro Tour TMS Chinese Taipei Open; Taipei, Chinese Taipei
U21 Boys' Singles	Silver	10 September 2005	ITTF Pro Tour Panasonic China Open; Harbin, People's Republic of China
U21 Boys' Singles	Gold	24 September 2005	ITTF Pro Tour Volkswagen Japan Open; Yokohama, Japan
Men's Team	Gold	30 November 2005	23rd SEA Games; Malate, Manila, Philippines
Mixed doubles (with Zhang Xueling)	Gold	2 December 2005	23rd SEA Games; Malate, Manila, Philippines
Men's doubles (with Cai Xiaoli)	Gold	3 December 2005	23rd SEA Games; Malate, Manila, Philippines
Men's singles	Bronze	4 December 2005	23rd SEA Games; Malate, Manila, Philippines
U21 Boys' Singles	Gold	11 December 2005	ITTF Pro Tour Grand Finals; Fuzhou, People's Republic of China
2006
Men's doubles (with Gao Ning)	Bronze	22 January 2006	ITTF Pro Tour Liebherr Slovenian Open; Velenje, Slovenia
Men's Team (with Cai Xiaoli)	Silver	20 March 2006	18th Commonwealth Games; Melbourne, Victoria, Australia
Mixed doubles (with Zhang Xueling)	Gold	24 March 2006	18th Commonwealth Games; Melbourne, Victoria, Australia
Men's doubles (with Cai Xiaoli)	Bronze	25 March 2006	18th Commonwealth Games; Melbourne, Victoria, Australia
Men's doubles (with Gao Ning)	Silver	5 November 2006	ITTF Pro Tour Eurosib Russian Open; Saint Petersburg, Russia
Men's doubles (with Gao Ning)	Silver	12 November 2006	ITTF Pro Tour Liebherr German Open; Bayreuth, Bavaria, Germany
Mixed doubles (with Li Jiawei)	Bronze	1–15 December 2006	15th Asian Games; Doha, Qatar

== Achievements ==
- 2009
  - ITTF Pro Tour German Open
    - Men's Doubles – 3rd
  - ITTF Pro Tour Indian Open
    - Men's Singles – 3rd
    - Men's Doubles – 1st
- 2008
  - ITTF Pro Tour Grand Finals
    - Men's Doubles – Gold (with Gao Ning)
  - Beijing Olympic Games
    - Round of 16
  - ITTF Pro Tour China Open
    - Men's Team – Top 4 (with Gao Ning, Cai Xiaoli)
  - ITTF Pro Tour Chile Open
    - Men's Doubles – 1st (Gao Ning)
- 2007
  - 24th SEA Games
    - Men's Team – Gold (with Gao Ning, Cai Xiaoli)
    - Men's Doubles – Gold (with Gao Ning)
    - Mixed Doubles – Gold (Li Jiawei)
  - ITTF Pro Tour Sweden Open
    - Men's Doubles – 2nd (with Gao Ning)
  - ITTF Pro Tour German Open
    - Men's Doubles – 2nd (with Gao Ning)
  - ITTF Pro Tour French Open
    - Men's Doubles – Top 4 (with Gao Ning)
  - ITTF Pro Tour Austria Open
    - Men's Doubles – 1st (with Gao Ning)
  - ITTF Pro Tour Taipei Open
    - Men's Doubles – 2nd (with Gao Ning)
  - ITTF Pro Tour Japan Open
    - Men's Doubles – Top 4 (with Gao Ning)
  - ITTF Pro Tour Korea Open
    - Men's Doubles – 2nd (with Gao Ning)
  - 17th Commonwealth Championships, India, Jaipur
    - Men's Team – Gold
    - Men's Singles – Silver
    - Men's Doubles – Silver (with Gao Ning)
    - Mixed Doubles – Gold (with Wang Yuegu)
  - ITTF Pro Tour Chille Open
    - Men's Singles – Top 4
    - Men's Doubles – 2nd (with Gao Ning)
  - ITTF Pro Tour Brazilian Open
    - Men's Doubles – 2nd (with Gao Ning)
  - ITTF Pro Tour Indian Open
    - Men's Doubles – 1st (with Gao Ning)
  - ITTF Pro Tour Taipei Open
    - Men's Doubles – 2nd (with Gao Ning)
