= World Championship of Ping Pong =

Ping pong tournament

The World Championship of Ping Pong, also known as WCPP, is an annual ping pong tournament that has been held since 2011. The current champion is Andrew Baggaley, who beat Alexander Flemming in the 2020 final to beat Maxim Shmyrev's record of winning three championships, and become the record-breaking four-time champion.

The tournament is promoted by the English sports impresario Barry Hearn, and is distinguished by its use of old-fashioned wooden paddles covered with sandpaper, which are intended to encourage slower ball movement and longer rallies for the entertainment of the live audience.

== Finals ==
The 2020 championship took place January 25–26, 2019, at Alexandra Palace for the eighth time.

Year	Champion	Score	Runner-up	Venue
2011	(Russia) Maxim Shmyrev	3–1	(Philippines) Ernesto Ebuen	Palms Casino Resort, Las Vegas (United States)
2013	(Russia) Maxim Shmyrev	3–2	(Nigeria) Sule Olaleye	Alexandra Palace, London (United Kingdom)
2014	(Russia) Maxim Shmyrev	3–0	(United States) Ilija Lupulesku	Alexandra Palace, London (United Kingdom)
2015	(England) Andrew Baggaley	3–2	(Germany) Alexander Flemming	Alexandra Palace, London (United Kingdom)
2016	(England) Andrew Baggaley	3–2	(Russia) Maxim Shmyrev	Alexandra Palace, London (United Kingdom)
2017	(China) Yan Weihao	3–1	(Germany) Alexander Flemming	Alexandra Palace, London (United Kingdom)
2018	(China) Wang Shibo	3–2	(China) Huang Jungang	Alexandra Palace, London (United Kingdom)
2019	(England) Andrew Baggaley	3–2	(China) Wang Shibo	Alexandra Palace, London (United Kingdom)
2020	(England) Andrew Baggaley	3–2	(Germany) Alexander Flemming	Alexandra Palace, London (United Kingdom)

== Broadcasters ==
=== United Kingdom and Ireland ===
The tournament is currently broadcast live on Sky Sports.

=== International ===
The tournament is also broadcast live and free on Facebook.

Country/Region	Broadcaster
Australia	Fox Sports
Austria	DAZN
Brazil	DAZN
Canada	DAZN
Germany	DAZN
Italy	DAZN
Japan	DAZN
Spain	DAZN
Switzerland	DAZN
United States	DAZN
Czech Republic	Nova Sport
Slovakia	Nova Sport
New Zealand	Sky Sport
Nordic countries: Denmark; Finland; Norway; Sweden	NENT
