= Table tennis at the 2005 SEA Games =

- Venue: Ninoy Aquino Stadium
- Location: RMSC, Malate, Manila
- Dates: 28 November – 4 December

Table tennis at the 2005 SEA Games took place in the Ninoy Aquino Stadium, Rizal Memorial Sports Complex in Malate, Manila, Philippines. The participants were competing to win at least one of the 7 gold medals at stake.

== Medal tally ==
* Host nation (Philippines)

Rank	Nation	Gold	Silver	Bronze	Total
1	Singapore	6	2	2	10
2	Indonesia	1	2	4	7
3	Thailand	0	1	3	4
4	Vietnam	0	1	2	3
5	Philippines*	0	1	1	2
6	Malaysia	0	0	1	1
6	Myanmar	0	0	1	1
Totals (7 entries)		7	7	14	28

== Medalists ==
Event	Gold	Silver	Bronze
Men's singles	Muhammad Hussein; Indonesia	Richard Gonzales; Philippines	Yang Zi; Singapore
Men's singles	Muhammad Hussein; Indonesia	Richard Gonzales; Philippines	Đoàn Kiến Quốc; Vietnam
Women's singles	Zhang Xueling; Singapore	Li Jiawei; Singapore	Nanthana Komwong; Thailand
Women's singles	Zhang Xueling; Singapore	Li Jiawei; Singapore	Christine Ferliana; Indonesia
Men's doubles	Singapore; Cai Xiaoli; Yang Zi	Indonesia; David Jacobs; Yon Mardiyono	Indonesia; Muhammad Hussein; Reno Handoyo
Men's doubles	Singapore; Cai Xiaoli; Yang Zi	Indonesia; David Jacobs; Yon Mardiyono	Vietnam; Nguyễn Nam Hải; Trần Tuấn Quỳnh
Women's doubles	Singapore; Li Jiawei; Zhang Xueling	Indonesia; Ceria Nilasari Jusma; Christine Ferliana	Thailand; Anisara Muangsuk; Nanthana Komwong
Women's doubles	Singapore; Li Jiawei; Zhang Xueling	Indonesia; Ceria Nilasari Jusma; Christine Ferliana	Singapore; Tan Paey Fern; Xu Yan
Mixed doubles	Singapore; Yang Zi; Zhang Xueling	Singapore; Cai Xiaoli; Li Jiawei	Malaysia; Muhd Shakirin Ibrahim; Beh Lee Wei
Mixed doubles	Singapore; Yang Zi; Zhang Xueling	Singapore; Cai Xiaoli; Li Jiawei	Thailand; Chaisit Chaitat; Anisara Muangsuk
Men's team	Singapore; Cai Xiaoli; Clarence Lee Tien Hoe; Yang Zi	Vietnam; Đoàn Kiến Quốc; Nguyễn Nam Hải; Trần Tuấn Quỳnh	Indonesia; Muhammad Hussein; Reno Handoyo; Yon Mardiyono
Men's team	Singapore; Cai Xiaoli; Clarence Lee Tien Hoe; Yang Zi	Vietnam; Đoàn Kiến Quốc; Nguyễn Nam Hải; Trần Tuấn Quỳnh	Philippines; Ernesto Ebuen; Julius Esposo; Richard Gonzales
Women's team	Singapore; Li Jiawei; Tan Paey Fern; Zhang Xueling	Thailand; Anisara Muangsuk; Nanthana Komwong; Suttilux Rattanaprayoon	Myanmar; Aye Lu; Ei Ei Myo; Zin Myat Phyu
Women's team	Singapore; Li Jiawei; Tan Paey Fern; Zhang Xueling	Thailand; Anisara Muangsuk; Nanthana Komwong; Suttilux Rattanaprayoon	Indonesia; Ceria Nilasari Jusma; Christine Ferliana; Istiyanti Lindawati
