= Hamad Al-Hammadi (table tennis) =

Qatari table tennis player

Personal information
- Nationality: Qatar
- Born: 26 November 1975 (age 50)
- Height: 1.69 m (5 ft 7 in)
- Weight: 68 kg (150 lb)

Sport
- Sport: Table tennis

Hamad Al-Hammadi (born 26 November 1975) is a Qatari table tennis player. He competed in the 1996 and 2000 Summer Olympics.
