= Farjad Saif =

Pakistani table tennis player (born 1966)

Personal information
- Nationality: Pakistani
- Born: 24 July 1966 (age 60) Karachi, Pakistan

Sport
- Sport: Table tennis

Farjad Saif (Urdu: فرجاد سیف; born 24 July 1966) is a Pakistani table tennis player who made history as the first and only table tennis player to represent Pakistan at the Olympic Games. He competed in the men's singles event at the 1988 Summer Olympics in Seoul, finishing the tournament ranked 25th in the world. He holds a record 13 national championship titles in Pakistan. He is also the only player in Pakistani history to win the national championship seven times in a row.

He successfully represented Pakistan in regional tournaments, earning multiple accolades including medals at the South Asian Games in men's singles, men's doubles and team events. Following his historic sporting career, he transition into the corporate banking sector. He serves as the Head of Department for Leasing & Licensing (General Services & Real Estate Group) at Allied Bank Limited (ABL) in Lahore.
