= Foreign Sports Talent Scheme =

Singaporean citizenship program

The Foreign Sports Talent Scheme (FST), initially known as Project Rainbow, was a scheme used by sports officials and organisations in Singapore to scout and facilitate the migration of non-Singaporeans deemed to possess sports talent to play in Singapore colours in sporting events. Introduced in 1993 by the Singapore Table Tennis Association, it also aimed to boost local sporting standards by importing sporting expertise.

In March 2008, it was announced in the Parliament of Singapore that 54 athletes had benefited from the programme and received Singapore citizenship, of which 37 were still in active training.

As of November 2009, 4.6 per cent, or 39 athletes, of the total number of national athletes in Singapore are foreigners who are brought in through the scheme. The majority of the foreign sports talent are 19 for badminton and 11 for table tennis.

== Debate ==
The achievement of Singapore's women's table tennis team in winning a silver medal at the 2008 Olympic Games in Beijing, the country's first Olympic medal since 1960, reignited debate over the Foreign Sports Talent Scheme. Some critics said that the Singapore Table Tennis Association (STTA) has relied too much on it, as the team consisted of three China-born players, Feng Tianwei, Li Jiawei and Wang Yuegu.

A day earlier, STTA president Lee Bee Wah had said: "It doesn't mean that we should look at them [foreign-born table tennis players] differently because they're not born and brought up in Singapore. The important thing is that they have embraced Singapore and want to be a part of it. And they wanted so badly to win a medal for our country. We should not be harping on where they are born. I hope mindsets change." In addition, during his Mandarin National Day Rally speech on 17 August, Prime Minister Lee Hsien Loong said:

In the Olympics contingent, there are 25 members, half of whom are new Singaporeans. Why do we need them? Make a single calculation. The Chinese have 1.3 billion people. Singapore has a population of four million ... If we want to win glory for Singapore and do well not only in sports but in many other areas, we cannot merely depend on the local-born. We need to attract talent from all over ... Look at the Beijing Olympics. Tao Li, the swimmer, she's done very well. The women's table-tennis team ... they have won an Olympic medal. We welcome foreigners so they can strengthen our team, and we can reduce our constraints. So let us welcome and let us encourage them.

In a 2009 Parliament session, Nominated Member of Parliament Joscelin Yeo questioned if a minimum ratio of local athletes versus athletes who graduate under the FST Scheme is needed, to ensure Singapore-born hopefuls have the opportunity to realise their full potential. In a written response, Minister for Community Development, Youth and Sports (MCYS) Vivian Balakrishnan said that Singapore will continue to embrace talented foreign athletes who want to represent the country, as long as they raise the standard of sports in Singapore.

Balakrishnan also laid down the three principles that guide the FST policy: openness to global talent, fairness in treatment of FSTs and local-born athletes, and ensuring the integration of the foreign-born athletes into society. FST application is processed by MCYS and the Singapore Sports Council, with the Ministry of Home Affairs final approval for each athlete to gain Permanent Residency and subsequent Singapore citizenship. Balakrishnan maintained that there was no need to set a ratio on the number of FSTs in each sport as the Singapore Youth Sports Development Committee is working to grow the pool of young local athletes by spotting young talent early and nurturing them, and giving them greater exposure to competition.

Balakrishnan revealed that FSTs currently make up 4.6 per cent of the total number of athletes among the development and national squads of the seven key sports in the country. Badminton and table tennis have the most number of FSTs in their teams with 19 FSTs out of 97 badminton players, and 11 FSTs out of 85 table tennis players.

== Athletics ==
Singapore Athletic Association's (SAA) President, Loh Lin Kok, brought in shot put specialists Du Xianhui, Zhang Guirong and Dong Enxin from China under the scheme in 1998. Dong became a Singapore citizen in May 2001 while Du and Zhang became Singapore citizen in October 2003.

Another shot putter, Luan Wei and hammer thrower E Xiaoxu were brought to Singapore in 1999.

Du returned to China after a dispute over an administrative process for her drug testing in 2007 and retired from sports. in 2013, she was persuaded by SAA officials to come back to compete for Singapore again.

Luan and E Xiaoxu were involved in court cases with the SAA over unfair dismissal while Dong had disappointed in performance.

Loh admitted in an interview in 2007 that the scheme had failed miserably for the SAA but will not abandon the scheme. Loh, in 2008, said it was a total failure for SAA and had "feared the worst when we brought them in."

== Badminton ==
As of 2022, Singapore Badminton Association's last foreign badminton player to receive Singapore citizenship was in 2014.

== Football ==
The Football Association of Singapore (FAS) adopted the FST Scheme in 2000 but was limited to scouting talent for the Singapore national football team to boost Singaporean football. Its goal is to attract foreign players in Singapore to change nationality and thus play for Singapore. The scheme is described as the second key pillar of the FAS football excellence plans.

Launched in the year 2000, its objective was to complement the FAS Youth Development programme by identifying the playing positions in the national team that were lacking, especially from its youth development output and to fill these gaps with FSTs. The first FSTs were inducted in Jan 2002.

In 2002, the national team welcomed Croatian-born Mirko Grabovac, Brazilian-born Egmar Gonçalves and English defender Daniel Bennett to strengthen the national team. The Nigerian-born pair of Agu Casmir and Itimi Dickson received their Singapore citizenship in 2003 and 2004 respectively. The FAS, with the help of the clubs, also identified several other talented U-21 foreign players under this scheme. Their performances were closely monitored in the S.League.

From 2007, the FAS accepted changes to the scheme which requires new foreign sports talents to play in the S.League for a minimum of two seasons after being granted Singapore citizenship.

When the FAS first launched the FST scheme in 2000, the intention was to offer citizenship to two or three foreign players each year. However, due to the stringent selection process and early success of the youth development programme, to date, only nine foreign-born players have been granted Singapore citizenship. All of them have played in the S.League to contribute to the local football scene and also played for the national team.

In 2018, FAS announced they would be reviving the scheme after an 8-year break, with 2 potential footballers to be included in the scheme. One of them was revealed to be Song Ui-young from South Korea.

In 2022, after the national football team was knocked out of the group stage of the 2022 AFF Championship, there were renewed calls for FAS to use the FST Scheme to boost the quality of the national team.

As of 2025, the last football player to be granted citizenship under the scheme was Qiu Li, who received citizenship in 2010 and eligible to play for Singapore in 2010 under FIFA rules.

On 6 February 2025, the Football Association of Singapore general secretary Chew Chun-Liang announced that Perry Ng would be applying for Singapore citizenship through the Foreign Sports Talent Scheme.

== See also ==
- List of Foreign Sports Talent Scheme Athletes
