= Maxim Shmyrev =

Russian table tennis player

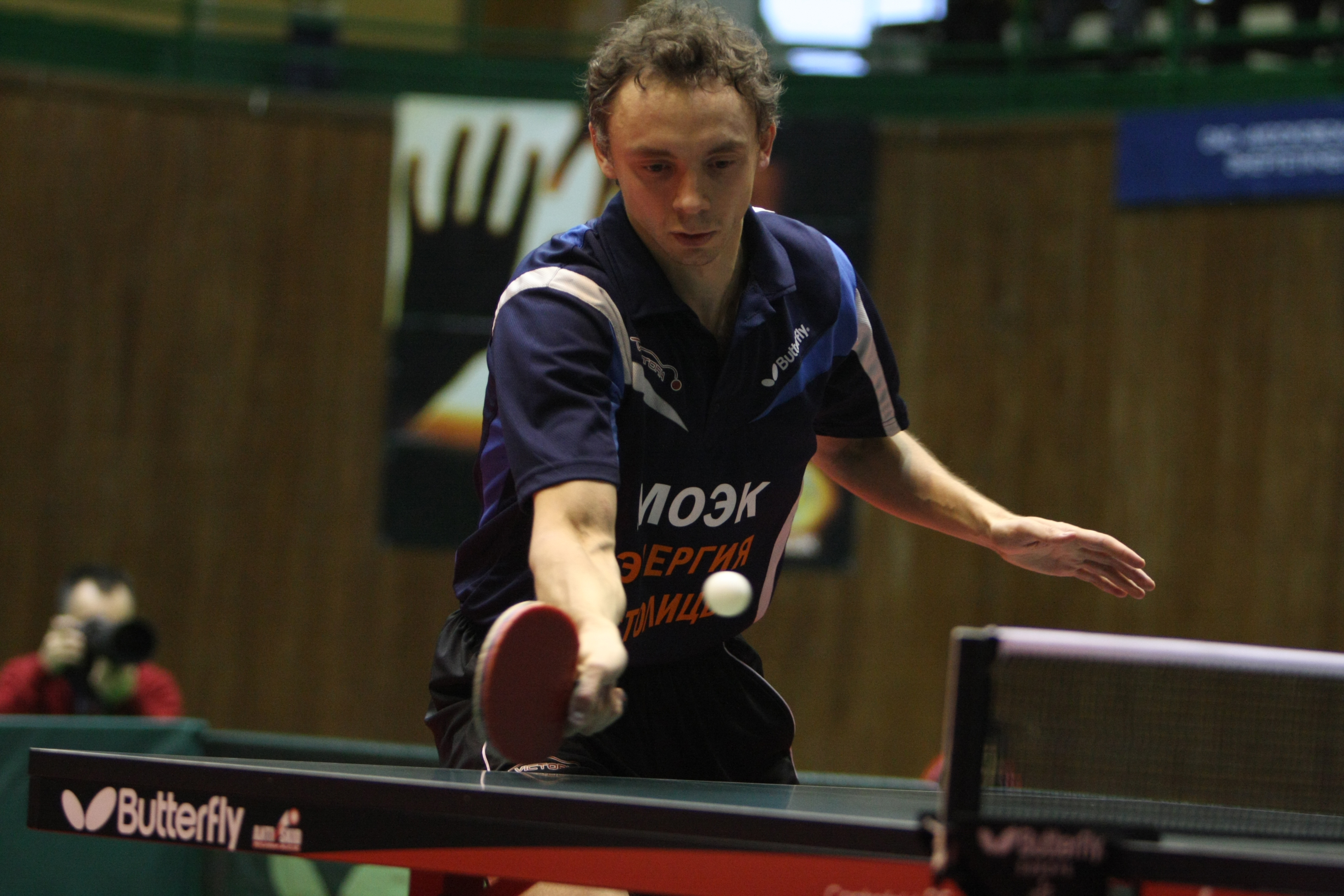

Personal information
- Full name: Maxim Shmyrev
- Nationality: Russia
- Born: 30 November 1971 (age 54) Moscow, Soviet Union (today as Russia)

Sport
- Sport: Table tennis
- Playing style: Offensive, two-wing looper
Medal record
Men's table tennis
Representing Russia
European Championships
Bronze medal – third place	1996 Bratislava	Mixed
Table Tennis Russian Championships
Gold medal – first place	1992,1994,1996,1999,2000	Singles
Gold medal – first place	2002	Doubles
Gold medal – first place	1992,1993,1995,1997,2000,2002	Mixed Doubles

Maxim Shmyrev (born 30 November 1971) is a male table tennis player from Moscow, Russia. He is a multiple Russian National Champion in table tennis, winning Men Singles title five times. He is also a three-times world champion of ping-pong (sandpaper), having won the first three world championships in that discipline, from 2011 to 2014.

== Career ==
In February 2011, he participated in an inaugural World Championship of Ping Pong held in Las Vegas, USA. In the final match he defeated Ernesto Ebuen from Philippines 3–1. Then in 2012 he was once again selected (as part of the Russian team) to play at the second worlds championship held in London, UK. He went undefeated again, winning his very tough final match vs Sule Olaleye from Nigeria with the score of 3–2. In January 2014 he easily defeated 3-0 Ilija Lupulesku (United States) in the final of the third WCPP. However, in the fourth WCPP held at the same location in January 2015 he lost his semifinal match to the eventual winner Andrew Baggaley.

He is also very active in table tennis administration and currently sits on the board of Russian Table Tennis Federation, also being its vice-president.

== See also ==
- List of table tennis players
