= Cai Xiaoli =

Chinese-born Singaporean table tennis player

Personal information
- Nationality: Singapore
- Born: 21 November 1979 (age 46) Beijing, China
- Height: 1.78 m (5 ft 10 in)
- Weight: 70 kg (154 lb; 11 st 0 lb)

Sport
- Sport: Table tennis
- Playing style: Right-handed Shakehand grip
Medal record
Men's Table Tennis
Representing Singapore
Event	1st	2nd	3rd
Commonwealth Games	1	2	2
Southeast Asian Games	8	3	2
Total	9	10	4
Commonwealth Games
Gold medal – first place	2010 Delhi	Team
Silver medal – second place	2006 Melbourne	Mixed doubles
Silver medal – second place	2006 Melbourne	Team
Bronze medal – third place	2002 Manchester	Team
Bronze medal – third place	2006 Melbourne	Doubles
Southeast Asian Games
Gold medal – first place	1999 Bandar Seri Begawan	Team
Gold medal – first place	2003 Vietnam	Doubles
Gold medal – first place	2003 Vietnam	Mixed doubles
Gold medal – first place	2003 Vietnam	Team
Gold medal – first place	2005 Manila	Doubles
Gold medal – first place	2005 Manila	Team
Gold medal – first place	2007 Nakhon Ratchasima	Team
Gold medal – first place	2009 Vientiane	Team
Silver medal – second place	2001 Kuala Lumpur	Doubles
Silver medal – second place	2009 Kuala Lumpur	Team
Silver medal – second place	2005 Manila	Mixed doubles
Bronze medal – third place	2003 Vietnam	Singles
Bronze medal – third place	2009 Vientiane	Doubles

Cai Xiaoli (born 21 November 1979), also known as Cai Xiao Li, is a former Singaporean international table tennis player.

== Early life ==
Cai was born in Beijing, China in 1979.

Cai moved to Singapore when he was around 14 under the Foreign Sports Talent Scheme.

== Career ==
In 2004 he won the Commonwealth Championships mixed doubles with partner Zhang Xueling. He was on the Singapore A team at the 2006 Australian Open, where he won the Mixed Doubles with partner Sun Beibei.

In January 2008 his world ranking was 155.

Cai competed at the following international events:

- World Championships: 2005 men's singles, 2007 men's singles, 2007 mixed doubles, 2009 men's singles, 2009 men's doubles, 2009 mixed doubles
- Olympic Games: 2008 men's team
- Commonwealth Games: 2002, 2006, 2010 men's singles, 2010 mixed doubles
- Asian Games: 2002 men's singles, 2002 men's doubles, 2002 mixed doubles, 2006 men's doubles, 2006 men's team, 2010 men's team
- Southeast Asian Games: 1999, 2001, 2003, 2005, 2007, and 2009

Cai retired in 2011 and became the assistant coach of the national women's table tennis team.

=== As coach ===
In January 2014, Cai resigned as the head coach of the Singapore’s Youth Olympic Games table tennis team, citing personal reasons, just months before the 2014 Summer Youth Olympics to be held in China.
