= Li Jiawei =

Chinese-born Singaporean table tennis player

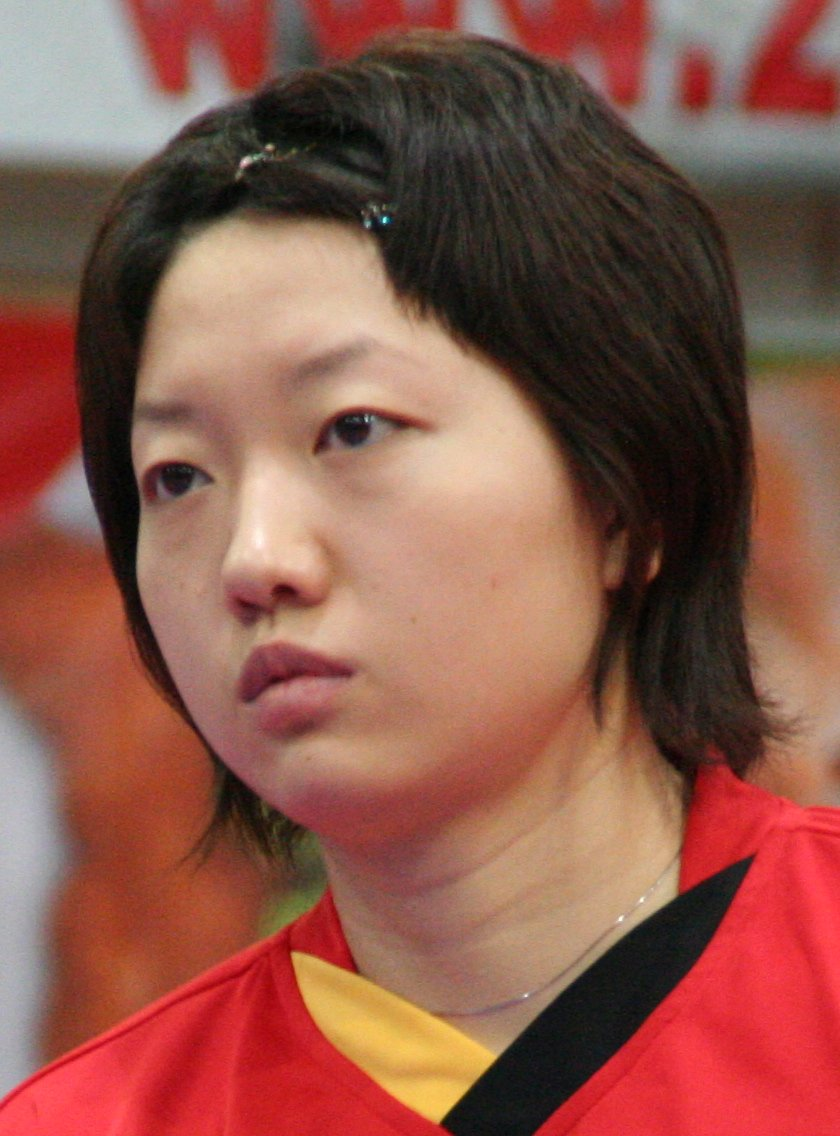
- Li at the ITTP Pro Tour Liebherr Austrian Open

Personal information
- Nationality: Singapore
- Born: 9 August 1981 (age 45) Beijing, China
- Height: 1.73 m (5 ft 8 in) (2008)
- Weight: 60 kg (132 lb) (2008)

Sport
- Sport: Table tennis
- Club: Beijing Holdings (in China Table Tennis Super League)
- Playing style: Right-handed shakehand grip
- Equipment: Stiga blade
- Highest ranking: 3rd (Oct 2005)
Medal record
Women's table tennis
Representing Singapore
Olympic Games
Silver medal – second place	2008 Beijing	Team
Bronze medal – third place	2012 London	Team
World Championships
Gold medal – first place	2010 Moscow	Team
Silver medal – second place	2008 Guangzhou	Team
Silver medal – second place	2012 Dortmund	Team
Bronze medal – third place	2007 Zagreb	Doubles
World Cup
Silver medal – second place	2010 Dubai	Team
Bronze medal – third place	2006 Urumqi	Singles
Bronze medal – third place	2011 Magdeburg	Team
Asian Championships
Silver medal – second place	2007 Yangzhou	Team
Silver medal – second place	2012 Macau	Doubles
Silver medal – second place	2012 Macau	Mixed Doubles
Silver medal – second place	2012 Macau	Team
Bronze medal – third place	2005 Jeju-do	Singles

Li Jiawei
- Chinese: 李佳薇
Transcriptions
Standard Mandarin
- Hanyu Pinyin: Lǐ Jiāwēi
- Wade–Giles: Li Chia-wei
- IPA: [lì tɕjáwéɪ]

Li Jiawei (Chinese: 李佳薇; pinyin: Lǐ Jiāwēi; born 9 August 1981) is a retired Chinese-born former Singaporean table tennis player, four-time Olympian, and twice Olympic medalist. She trained in Beijing's famous Shichahai Sports School with Olympic medalist Zhang Yining. In 1995, she moved to Singapore and in the following year, she commenced her international career as a competitive table tennis player. She became a Singapore citizen at the age of 18 under the Foreign Sports Talent Scheme.

Li's highest world singles ranking was in December 2005, when she was placed third. Li was also a key player for the Singaporean women's team and doubles, and mixed doubles events, having participated in three Olympics and achieving a medal for the latter two. She finished in fourth place in singles at both the 2004 Summer Olympics in Athens and the 2008 Summer Olympics in Beijing at which she was an official flagbearer.

On 15 August 2008, the Singapore women's team, composed of Li and her teammates Feng Tianwei and Wang Yuegu, defeated South Korea 3–2 in the semifinals. However, in the finals on 17 August, the team lost to China and earned a silver medal, marking the first time that Singapore had won an Olympic medal since the nation's independence in 1965. The momentous occasion came 48 years after Tan Howe Liang won the country's first medal, a silver in weightlifting at the 1960 Summer Olympics in Rome. Li ended 2008 on a high, winning gold in the women's team event with Feng and Wang at the ITTF Pro Tour ERKE German Open in Berlin in November, and in the doubles with Sun Beibei at the ITTF Volkswagen Pro Tour Grand Finals in Macau in December 2008.

Li won the women's team bronze medal with Feng and Wang at the 2012 Summer Olympics in London. Soon after, she announced her retirement from competitive sports on 27 December 2012.

== Early years ==
Li was born on 9 August 1981 in Beijing, People's Republic of China, the only daughter of a government official and a housewife. Interestingly, her birthday coincides with the independence day of her adopted nation. In 1990, Li was a student at the Beijing Shichahai Sports School. In 1994, she entered the Beijing provincial team and her skills in table tennis were recognized by Singaporean talent scouts. In 1996, she was invited to train in Singapore under the Foreign Sports Talent Scheme, only returning to China once a year to visit her parents. She began representing Singapore internationally in competitive table tennis the following year. At 18, she became a Singapore citizen.

== Professional career ==
Ranked 18th in the world in 2000, Li achieved gold medals in the women's team, women's doubles and mixed doubles events at the XVII Commonwealth Games held between 25 July and 4 August 2002 in Manchester, and was ranked eighth in November 2002. The following year, in December 2003, Li was a member of the Singapore team which swept the top awards at the 23rd Southeast Asian Games in the women's team, women's singles, women's doubles and mixed doubles.

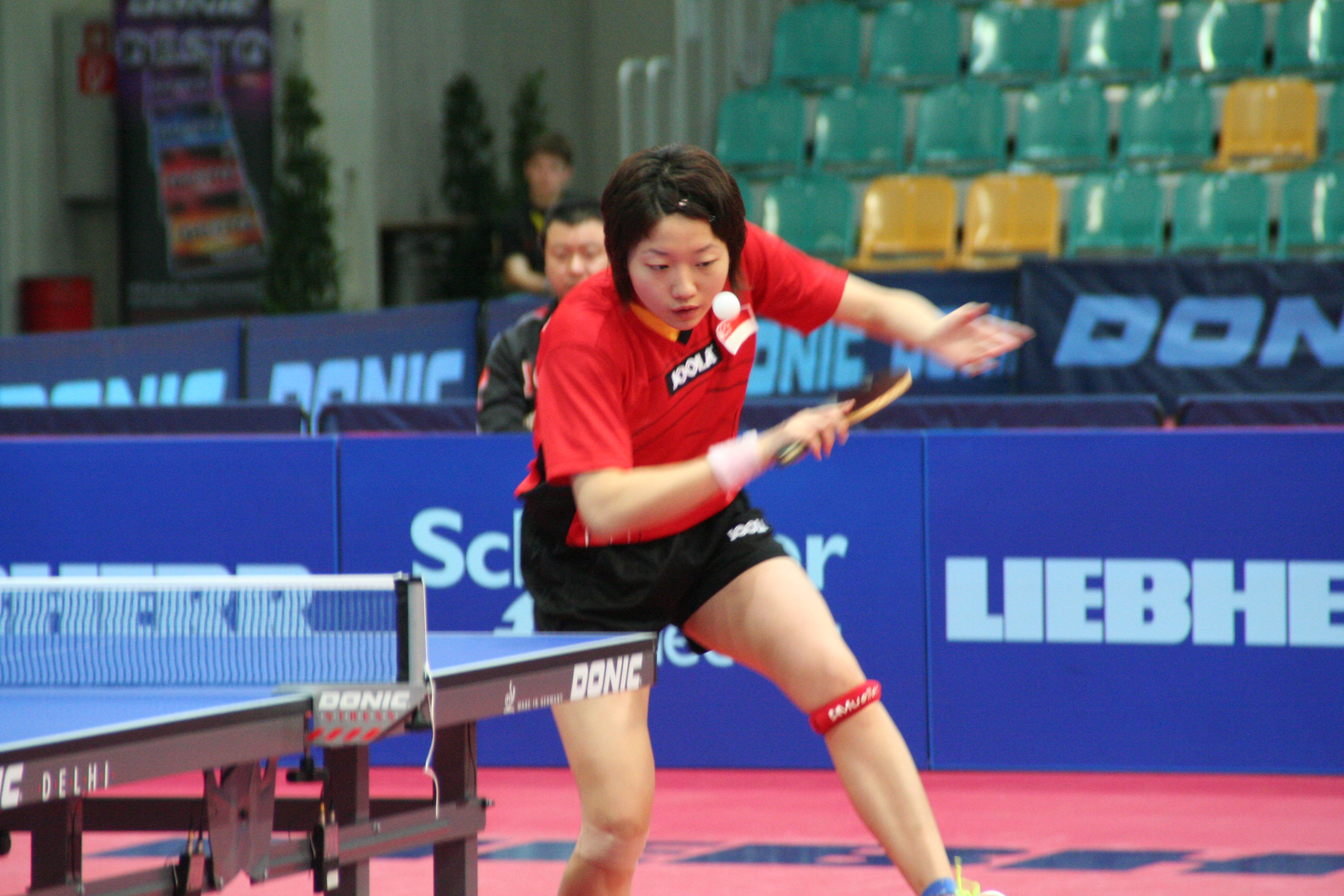
Li in action at the ITTF Pro Tour Liebherr Austrian Open in Wels, Austria, on 28 October 2007

On 3 July 2004, Li took gold in the women's singles at the International Table Tennis Federation (ITTF) Pro Tour US Open in Chicago. Subsequently, at the 2004 Summer Olympics in Athens, she defeated the second-seeded China player Wang Nan but eventually finished in fourth place. In 2005, she was second in the ITTF Pro Tour Grand Finals, and gained silver medals for the women's singles and mixed doubles at the 23rd Southeast Asian (SEA) Games held between 28 November and 4 December 2005 in Manila. She was also the key player in the gold-winning women's team and women's doubles events. In December 2005, she was ranked third in the world as a singles player. She won an individual Singapore Youth Award in 2005 and was Her World magazine's Young Woman Achiever of 2005.

At the 2006 Commonwealth Games in Melbourne, Li won gold for the women's team and women's doubles, and the silver medal for the women's singles and mixed doubles events. Subsequently, she won the women's singles at the ITTF Pro Tour Russia Open. She also achieved third place in the ITTF Pro Tour Grand Finals and the Women's World Cup, which are two of the most prestigious and difficult competitions in the table tennis arena. At the 15th Asian Games held from 29 November to 7 December 2006 in Doha, Qatar, she achieved three medals: a silver for the women's team event and two bronzes for the women's singles and mixed doubles. The next year, she won gold in the singles at the ITTF Pro Tour Chinese Taipei Open in Taipei, and helped Singapore to the top spots in the women's team and mixed doubles events at the 2007 SEA Games in Nakhon Ratchasima (Korat), Thailand.

As at August 2008, Li was ranked sixth in the world. She won the accolade of Sportswoman of the Year from the Singapore National Olympic Council five times in a row between 2002 and 2006, and received a Meritorious Award in 2007.

At the club competition level, Li played in the Chinese Table Tennis Super League. In 2008, she represented Peking University club, and in 2010, she played for Beijing Holdings, a team including world champion Ding Ning.

=== 2008 Summer Olympics ===
Li represented Singapore for the third time in the Olympic Games at the 2008 Summer Olympics in Beijing. She was the flag-bearer for Team Singapore at the opening ceremony of the Games on 8 August, having requested the honour. She explained: "There has been so much debate over the foreign talent scheme. This is my way of showing everyone that everything I've ever achieved is because of Singapore."

At the Beijing Olympics, on 13 August 2008, the Singapore women's table tennis team, coached by Liu Guodong and with Li as the team captain leading teammates Feng Tianwei and Wang Yuegu, beat teams from the United States and Nigeria with comfortable 3–0 wins. On 14 August, the Singapore team also defeated the Netherlands 3–0 to reach the semifinals, but not before a gruelling five-game doubles match against the Dutch players Li Jie and Elena Timina which Li Jiawei and Wang Yuegu eventually won 3–2. The next day, 15 August, the Singapore team defeated the South Korean team of Dang Ye-Seo, Kim Kyung-Ah and Park Mi-Young 3–2 in the semifinals, which went to five matches. Li lost her singles match to Korea's Kim, but beat Kim and Park in the doubles with her partner Wang. Singapore's Feng won both her singles matches against Dang and Park.

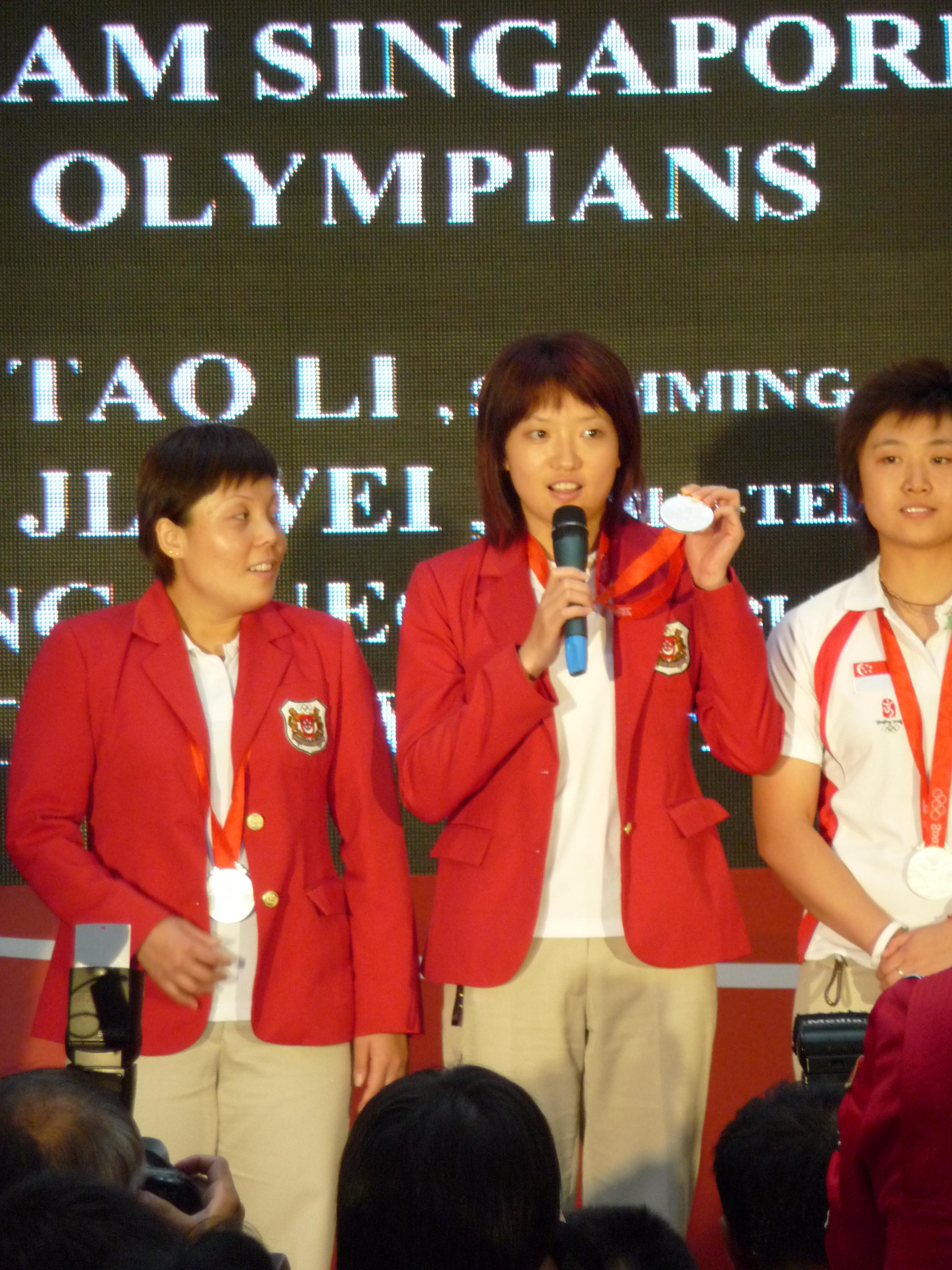
Li speaking during a ceremony on 25 August 2008 welcoming Team Singapore home from the 2008 Summer Olympics, flanked by Wang Yuegu and Feng Tianwei

On 17 August 2008, Li and her teammates gained Singapore a silver medal in women's table tennis after losing to China in three matches. Li won the first game of her singles match, but was then defeated by her former Beijing Sports School teammate Zhang Yining. In the doubles match, China's Zhang and Guo Yue bested Singapore's Li and Wang Yuegu. This marked the first time that Singapore had won an Olympic medal since the nation's independence in 1965. The medal came 48 years after Tan Howe Liang won the country's first medal, a silver in weightlifting in the lightweight category at the 1960 Summer Olympics in Rome. Prime Minister Lee Hsien Loong requested that the live English-language broadcast of his National Day Rally speech, which coincided with the table tennis finals, be postponed by a day. He also provided the audience with updates on the score, and made a conference call to Tan Eng Liang, Team Singapore's chef de mission, to congratulate the team.

Li and her teammates received byes into the third round of the singles tournament. She beat Croatia's Tamara Boroš in the third round, Hong Kong's Lin Ling in the fourth round, and the USA's Wang Chen in the quarter-finals. However, on 22 August she was defeated in the semifinals 4–1 by Zhang Yining of China, ranked number one in the world, and lost the bronze medal 4–2 to China's Guo Yue. Thus placed fourth in the singles tournament, she equaled her performance in the 2004 Athens Olympics but again failed in her quest for an individual Olympic medal. After the bronze medal match, a tearful Li told reporters this would be her final Olympics. At a victory celebration in Singapore on 25 August, Vivian Balakrishnan, the Minister for Community Development, Youth and Sports, announced that Li, Feng and Wang would be presented with the Pingat Jasa Gemilang (Meritorious Service Medal), only the third time the medal would be awarded to athletes, the two previous recipients being weightlifter Tan Howe Liang (1962) and swimmer Joscelin Yeo (2006).

Li has expressed interest in pursuing a communications degree at Peking University. In October 2008 the Singapore Table Tennis Association said the Association and the Singapore Sports Council were prepared to offer her a scholarship to do so. Nevertheless, Li said that she wished to continue her career and to compete in the 2012 Summer Olympics.

In May 2009, the national table tennis women's team, composed of Li and her teammates Feng, Wang and Sun Beibei, were awarded the Team of the Year (Event) prize at the Singapore Sports Awards.

=== 2008–2012 ===
On 22 November 2008, despite crashing out of the singles event earlier, Li and her teammates Feng and Wang won the top title and US$8,000 at the ITTF Pro Tour ERKE German Open in Berlin. Li ended the year as top seed with Sun Beibei, achieving gold in the women's doubles at the ITTF Volkswagen Pro Tour Grand Finals in Macau on 14 December 2008, the first time that Singapore had won this event. They beat South Koreans Kim Kyung Ah and Park Mi-Young 11–5, 6–11, 11–9, 11–8, 11–4. Li was named Today newspaper's Singapore Athlete of the Year 2008.

Li returned to the international stage in February 2010 after taking a year off from competitive table tennis to give birth to a child. Her first major competition – the World Team Table Tennis Championships in Moscow – saw her and her teammates beating China in the finals to clinch gold. Li also had a series of good performances after her return. She guided the women's team to gold at the 2010 Commonwealth Games in New Delhi and went on to win the women's doubles title with Sun Beibei. She ended 2010 with winning the silver medal in the women's team event of the 16th Asian Games.

=== 2012 Summer Olympics ===
Li represented Singapore at the 2012 Summer Olympics in London. She participated in the women's team competition with Feng and Wang. They were beaten 0–3 by Japan in the semifinals, but took the bronze medal on 7 August 2012 by edging South Korea out 3–0. Feng defeated Kim Kyung Ah 11–9, 11–8, 4–11, 13–11; and Li also successfully fended off Seok Ha Jung 11–5, 11–8, 6–11, 11–8. Li and Wang then succeeded in the doubles game against Seok and Dang Ye Seo 11–9, 11–6, 6–11, 11–5. This marked the first time Singapore had won more than one medal at an Olympic Games.

== Retirement ==
Li announced her retirement from competitive sports on 27 December 2012. Although she planned to relocate to Beijing with her husband and son, she said she hoped to continue her involvement with table tennis in Singapore. The Singapore Table Tennis Association was said to be helping Li find employment in a Singapore company with operations based in China. In 2017, she and the Chinese Swimming Club (CSC) established the CSC – Jiawei Table Tennis Academy in Singapore, with Li becoming the CEO of the academy.

== Medals ==
Event	Medal	Date	Competition
1997
Women's team	Gold	1997	Commonwealth Championships; Glasgow, Scotland, UK
Women's singles	Bronze	1997	Commonwealth Championships; Glasgow, Scotland, UK
Women's doubles	Gold	1997	Commonwealth Championships; Glasgow, Scotland, UK
Mixed doubles	Gold	1997	Commonwealth Championships; Glasgow, Scotland, UK
1998
Women's team	Gold	1998	1998 Southeast Asian Championships; Bangkok, Thailand
Women's singles	Gold	1998	1998 Southeast Asian Championships; Bangkok, Thailand
Mixed doubles	Gold	1998	1998 Southeast Asian Championships; Bangkok, Thailand
1999
Women's singles	Bronze	1999	ITTF Pro Tour French Open; Lievin, France
Women's doubles	Bronze	1999	ITTF Pro Tour Czech Republic Open; Prague, Czech Republic
Women's team	Gold	7–15 August 1999	20th Southeast Asian (SEA) Games; Bandar Seri Begawan, Brunei Darussalam
Women's singles	Gold	7–15 August 1999	20th SEA Games; Bandar Seri Begawan, Brunei Darussalam
Women's doubles (with Jing Junhong)	Gold	7–15 August 1999	20th SEA Games; Bandar Seri Begawan, Brunei Darussalam
Mixed doubles (with Duan Yongjun)	Bronze	7–15 August 1999	20th SEA Games; Bandar Seri Begawan, Brunei Darussalam
2000
Women's doubles	Silver	2000	ITTF Pro Tour Swedish Open; Umeå, Sweden
Women's doubles	Bronze	2000	ITTF Pro Tour Danish Open; Farum, Denmark
Women's doubles	Bronze	2000	ITTF Pro Tour Polish Open; Warsaw, Poland
Women's doubles	Bronze	2000	ITTF Pro Tour Brazil Open; Rio de Janeiro, Brazil
Women's doubles	Bronze	2000	ITTF Pro Tour US Open; Fort Lauderdale, Florida, USA
Women's team	Gold	2000	Commonwealth Championships; Singapore
Women's singles	Gold	2000	Commonwealth Championships; Singapore
Women's doubles	Gold	2000	Commonwealth Championships; Singapore
Mixed doubles	Gold	2000	Commonwealth Championships; Singapore
Women's team	Gold	2000	South East Asian Championships; Kuala Lumpur, Malaysia
Women's singles	Gold	2000	South East Asian Championships; Kuala Lumpur, Malaysia
Women's doubles	Gold	2000	South East Asian Championships; Kuala Lumpur, Malaysia
Mixed doubles	Gold	2000	South East Asian Championships; Kuala Lumpur, Malaysia
2001
Women's doubles	Bronze	2001	ITTF Pro Tour Danish Open; Farum, Denmark
Women's doubles	Silver	2000	ITTF Pro Tour China Open; Hainan, China
Women's team	Gold	2001	Commonwealth Championships
Women's singles	Gold	2001	Commonwealth Championships
Women's doubles	Gold	2001	Commonwealth Championships
Mixed doubles (with Duan Yongjun)	Gold	2001	Commonwealth Championships
Women's team	Gold	8–17 September 2001	21st SEA Games; Kuala Lumpur, Malaysia
Women's singles	Gold	8–17 September 2001	21st SEA Games; Kuala Lumpur, Malaysia
Women's doubles (with Jing Junhong)	Gold	8–17 September 2001	21st SEA Games; Kuala Lumpur, Malaysia
Mixed doubles (with Duan Yongjun)	Bronze	8–17 September 2001	21st SEA Games; Kuala Lumpur, Malaysia
2002
Women's singles	Silver	23–27 January 2002	ITTF Pro Tour Austria Open; Wels, Austria
Women's singles	Bronze	5 May 2002	ITTF Pro Tour Italian Open; Courmayeur, Italy
Women's team	Gold	25 July – 4 August 2002	XVII Commonwealth Games; Manchester, England, UK
Women's singles	Silver	25 July – 4 August 2002	XVII Commonwealth Games; Manchester, England, UK
Women's doubles (with Jing Junhong)	Gold	25 July – 4 August 2002	XVII Commonwealth Games; Manchester, England, UK
Mixed doubles (with Duan Yongjun)	Gold	25 July – 4 August 2002	XVII Commonwealth Games; Manchester, England, UK
Women's team	Bronze	29 September – 14 October 2002	2002 Asian Games; Busan, Korea
Women's singles	Bronze	29 September – 14 October 2002	2002 Asian Games; Busan, Korea
2003
Women's singles	Bronze	5 October 2003	ITTF Pro Tour Malaysian Open; Johor Bahru, Malaysia
Women's doubles (with Jing Junhong)	Bronze	21 September 2003	ITTF Pro Tour Japan Open; Kobe, Japan
Women's doubles (with Jing Junhong)	Silver	7 September 2003	ITTF Pro Tour Korea Open; Jeju City, Jeju-do, South Korea
Women's team	Gold	12 December 2003	22nd SEA Games; Hanoi, Vietnam
Women's singles	Gold	12 December 2003	22nd SEA Games; Hanoi, Vietnam
Women's doubles (with Jing Junhong)	Gold	5–13 December 2003	22nd SEA Games; Hanoi, Vietnam
Mixed doubles (with Cai Xiaoli)	Gold	5–13 December 2003	22nd SEA Games; Hanoi, Vietnam
2004
Women's singles	Bronze	2004	Asian Cup; Kitakyūshū, Fukuoka Prefecture, Japan
Women's team	Gold	2004	Commonwealth Championships; Kuala Lumpur, Malaysia
Women's singles	Bronze	7 May 2004	ITTF Pro Tour Egypt Open; Cairo, Egypt
Women's doubles (with Jing Junhong)	Bronze	7 May 2004	ITTF Pro Tour Egypt Open; Cairo, Egypt
Women's singles	Bronze	23 May 2004	ITTF Pro Tour Volkswagen Korea Open; Pyeongchang, Gangwon-do, South Korea
Women's doubles (with Jing Junhong)	Bronze	23 May 2004	ITTF Pro Tour Volkswagen Korea Open; Pyeongchang, Gangwon-do, South Korea
Women's singles	Gold	3 July 2004	ITTF Pro Tour US Open; Chicago, Illinois, USA
Women's doubles	Bronze	3 July 2004	ITTF Pro Tour US Open; Chicago, Illinois, USA
2005
Women's singles	Gold	12–15 January 2005	ITTF Pro Tour Liebherr Slovenian Open; Velenje, Slovenia
Women's doubles (with Xu Yan)	Bronze	12–15 January 2005	ITTF Pro Tour Liebherr Slovenian Open; Velenje, Slovenia
Women's singles	Silver	12 June 2005	ITTF Pro Tour Volkswagen Korean Open; Suncheon, Jeollanam-do, South Korea
Women's singles	Silver	19 June 2005	ITTF Pro Tour TMS Chinese Taipei Open; Taipei, Chinese Taipei
Women's singles	Gold	10 July 2005	ITTF Pro Tour Liebherr US Open; Fort Lauderdale, Florida, USA
Women's singles	Bronze	2005	Asian Championships; Jeju-do, South Korea
Women's team	Gold	30 November 2005	23rd SEA Games; Malate, Manila, Philippines
Mixed doubles (with Yang Zi)	Silver	2 December 2005	23rd SEA Games; Malate, Manila, Philippines
Women's doubles (with Zhang Xueling)	Gold	3 December 2005	23rd SEA Games; Malate, Manila, Philippines
Women's singles	Silver	4 December 2005	23rd SEA Games; Malate, Manila, Philippines
Women's singles	Silver	11 December 2005	ITTF Pro Tour Grand Finals; Fuzhou, People's Republic of China
2006
Women's singles	Bronze	22 January 2006	ITTF Pro Tour Liebherr Slovenian Open; Velenje, Slovenia
Women's doubles (with Zhang Xueling)	Bronze	22 January 2006	ITTF Pro Tour Liebherr Slovenian Open; Velenje, Slovenia
Women's doubles (with Zhang Xueling)	Bronze	27 January 2006	ITTF Pro Tour Liebherr Croatian Open; Zagreb, Croatia
Women's team (with Zhang Xueling, Sharon Tan, Xu Yan and Zena Sim)	Gold	20 March 2006	18th Commonwealth Games; Melbourne, Victoria, Australia
Mixed doubles (with Cai Xiaoli)	Silver	24 March 2006	18th Commonwealth Games; Melbourne, Victoria, Australia
Women's doubles (with Zhang Xueling)	Gold	25 March 2006	18th Commonwealth Games; Melbourne, Victoria, Australia
Women's singles	Silver	26 March 2006	18th Commonwealth Games; Melbourne, Victoria, Australia
Women's singles	Silver	5 March 2006	Asian Cup; Kobe, Japan
Women's singles	Bronze	1 October 2006	ITTF Sinkiang Women's World Cup; Ürümqi, Xinjiang Uyghur Autonomous Region, People's Republic of China
Women's singles	Gold	1–5 November 2006	ITTF Pro Tour Eurosib Russian Open; Saint Petersburg, Russia
Women's doubles (with Sun Beibei)	Gold	5 November 2006	ITTF Pro Tour Eurosib Russian Open; Saint Petersburg, Russia
Women's singles	Silver	12 November 2006	ITTF Pro Tour Liebherr German Open; Bayreuth, Bavaria, Germany
Women's doubles (with Sun Beibei)	Gold	12 November 2006	ITTF Pro Tour Liebherr German Open; Bayreuth, Bavaria, Germany
Women's team (with Sun Beibei, Tan Paey Fern, Tan Yanzhen and Zhang Xueling)	Silver	1–15 December 2006	15th Asian Games; Doha, Qatar
Women's singles	Bronze	1–15 December 2006	15th Asian Games; Doha, Qatar
Mixed doubles (with Yang Zi)	Bronze	1–15 December 2006	15th Asian Games; Doha, Qatar
Women's singles	Bronze	17 December 2006	ITTF Pro Tour Grand Finals; Hong Kong
Women's doubles (with Sun Beibei)	Bronze	17 December 2006	ITTF Pro Tour Grand Finals; Hong Kong
Women's singles	Bronze	21 December 2006	Tournament of Champions; Changsha, People's Republic of China
2007
Women's singles	Gold	26 August 2007	ITTF Pro Tour Chinese Taipei Open; Taipei, Chinese Taipei
Women's doubles (with Sun Beibei)	Silver	26 August 2007	ITTF Pro Tour Chinese Taipei Open; Taipei, Chinese Taipei
Women's team (with Sun Beibei, Wang Yuegu, Tan Paey Fern and Yu Mengyu)	Silver	19 September 2007	18th China Mobile Asian Table Tennis Championships; Yangzhou, Jiangsu, People's Republic of China
Women's doubles (with Wang Yuegu)	Silver	4 November 2007	ITTF Pro Tour Liebherr French Open; Toulouse, France
Women's singles	Bronze	4 November 2007	ITTF Pro Tour Liebherr French Open; Toulouse, France
Women's team (with Sun Beibei, Tan Paey Fern, Wang Yuegu and Yu Mengyu)	Gold	5 December 2007	24th SEA Games; Nakhon Ratchasima (Korat), Thailand
Mixed doubles (with Yang Zi)	Gold	8 December 2007	24th SEA Games; Nakhon Ratchasima (Korat), Thailand
Women's doubles (with Wang Yuegu)	Silver	9 December 2007	24th SEA Games; Nakhon Ratchasima (Korat), Thailand
2008
Women's team (with Feng Tianwei, Wang Yuegu, Sun Beibei and Yu Mengyu)	Silver	1 March 2008	Evergrande Real Estate World Team Table Tennis Championships; Guangzhou, Guangdong, People's Republic of China
Women's doubles (with Sun Beibei)	Silver	16 March 2008	ITTF Pro Tour Kuwait Open; Kuwait City, Kuwait
Women's singles	Bronze	29–30 March 2008	2008 Asian Cup; Sapporo, Hokkaidō Prefecture, Japan
Women's singles	Silver	20 April 2008	ITTF Pro Tour Brazil Open; Belo Horizonte, Minas Gerais, Brazil
Women's doubles (with Sun Beibei)	Silver	20 April 2008	ITTF Pro Tour Brazil Open; Belo Horizonte, Minas Gerais, Brazil
Women's singles	Gold	27 April 2008	ITTF Pro Tour Chile Open; Santiago, Chile
Women's doubles (with Sun Beibei)	Silver	27 April 2008	ITTF Pro Tour Chile Open; Santiago, Chile
Women's team (with Feng Tianwei and Wang Yuegu)	Silver	24 May 2008	ITTF Pro Tour Volkswagen Japan Open; Yokohama, Kanagawa Prefecture, Japan
Women's doubles (with Sun Beibei)	Gold	8 June 2008	ITTF Pro Tour TMS Singapore Open; Singapore
Women's team (with Feng Tianwei and Wang Yuegu)	Silver	13–17 August 2008	2008 Summer Olympics; Beijing, People's Republic of China
Women's team (with Feng Tianwei and Wang Yuegu)	Gold	22 November 2008	ITTF Pro Tour ERKE German Open; Berlin, Germany
Women's doubles (with Sun Beibei)	Gold	14 December 2008	ITTF Volkswagen Pro Tour Grand Finals; Macau
2009
Women's singles	Bronze	11 January 2009	Tournament of Champions; Changsha, People's Republic of China
2010
Women's team (with Feng Tianwei, Sun Beibei, Wang Yuegu and Yu Mengyu)	Gold	30 May 2010	Liebherr World Team Table Tennis Championships; Moscow, Russia
Women's singles	Bronze	15 August 2010	ITTF Pro Tour Korean Open; Incheon, South Korea
Women's team (with Feng Tianwei, Wang Yuegu, Sun Beibei, Yu Mengyu)	Silver	1 October 2010	World Team Cup; Dubai, UAE
Women's team (with Feng Tianwei, Sun Beibei, Wang Yuegu and Yu Mengyu)	Gold	8 October 2010	19th Commonwealth Games; New Delhi, India
Women's doubles (with Sun Beibei)	Gold	14 October 2010	19th Commonwealth Games; New Delhi, India
Women's team (with Feng Tianwei, Sun Beibei, Wang Yuegu and Yu Mengyu)	Silver	16 November 2010	16th Asian Games; Guangzhou, China
2011
Women's doubles (with Yu Mengyu)	Bronze	22 January 2011	ITTF Pro Tour Slovenian Open; Velenje, Slovenia
Women's singles	Silver	12 June 2011	ITTF Pro Tour Brazil Open; Rio de Janeiro, Brazil
Women's doubles (with Wang Yuegu)	Gold	12 June 2011	ITTF Pro Tour Brazil Open; Rio de Janeiro, Brazil
Women's doubles (with Wang Yuegu)	Silver	10 July 2011	ITTF Pro Tour Japan Open; Kobe, Japan
Women's team (with Feng Tianwei, Wang Yuegu, Sun Beibei, Yu Mengyu)	Bronze	5 November 2011	World Team Cup; Magdeburg, Germany
Women's doubles (with Wang Yuegu)	Bronze	27 November 2011	ITTF Pro Tour Grand Finals; London, England
2012
Women's doubles (with Sun Beibei)	Silver	11 February 2012	ITTF GAC Group World Tour Qatar Open; Doha, Qatar
Women's team (with Feng Tianwei and Wang Yuegu)	Bronze	7 August 2012	2012 Summer Olympics; London, United Kingdom

== Personal life ==
Li first met Singaporean badminton player and fellow Olympian Ronald Susilo in 2002 at a sports meet. They began dating after participating together in the Athens Olympics, and the "golden sports couple", as they were dubbed by the media, announced their engagement in September 2004. They broke up in 2008.

On 26 September 2008, Li registered a marriage in Beijing with Li Chao, a businessman based in that city; they were introduced by a mutual friend in March 2008. Sources quoted by The Straits Times said Li had long wanted her children to bear her surname. A lavish wedding banquet was held at the Beijing Hotel on 25 April 2009. On 13 October 2009, she and her husband had their first child, a boy weighing 3.575 kilograms (7.88 lb).

== See also ==
- Singapore at the 2008 Summer Olympics
- Singapore at the 2012 Summer Olympics
- Table tennis at the 2008 Summer Olympics
- Table tennis at the 2012 Summer Olympics
- List of Singapore world champions in sports
