= Tan Paey Fern =

Singaporean table tennis player

Personal information
- Native name: 陈佩芬
- Full name: Sharon Tan Paey Fern
- Born: July 15, 1974 (age 52) Singapore
- Height: 160 cm (5 ft 3 in)
- Weight: 43 kg (95 lb; 6.8 st)

Sport
- Sport: Table tennis
- Playing style: Right-hand shakehand grip
Medal record
Women's Table Tennis
Representing Singapore
Asian Games
Silver medal – second place	2006 Doha	Team
Bronze medal – third place	2002 Busan	Team
Commonwealth Games
Gold medal – first place	2002 Manchester	Team
Gold medal – first place	2006 Melbourne	Team
Silver medal – second place	2006 Melbourne	Doubles
Bronze medal – third place	2002 Manchester	Singles
Bronze medal – third place	2002 Manchester	Doubles
Bronze medal – third place	2006 Melbourne	Mixed doubles
Southeast Asian Games
Gold medal – first place	1999 Bandar Seri Begawan	Team
Gold medal – first place	2001 Kuala Lumpur	Team
Gold medal – first place	2003 Vietnam	Team
Gold medal – first place	2005 Manila	Team
Gold medal – first place	2007 Nakhon Ratchasima	Team
Silver medal – second place	2003 Vietnam	Doubles
Bronze medal – third place	1993 Singapore	Doubles
Bronze medal – third place	1993 Singapore	Mixed doubles
Bronze medal – third place	1997 Jakarta Lumpur	Singles
Bronze medal – third place	1997 Jakarta Lumpur	Team
Bronze medal – third place	2005 Manila	Doubles

Tan Paey Fern (simplified Chinese: 陈佩芬; traditional Chinese: 陳佩芬; pinyin: Chén Pèifēn) is a Singaporean table tennis Player.

Tan was talent-scouted by ex-National Table Tennis Coach, Mr. Foo Soo Peng, when she was playing table tennis casually with her brother and some friends at the age of 9. Tan was a very determined young girl. She gave up her studies to practice table tennis. Her parents were worried but were very supportive. Tan's skills vastly improved, and she soon turned semi-professional, becoming a full-time professional player in 1993.

== Post athletic career ==
On 10 January 2018, Fern, was named as the chef de mission of Singapore's first ever Winter Olympic team.

== Achievements ==
- 2007
  - Commonwealth Championships
    - Gold - Women's Team
    - Bronze - Mixed Doubles (partner: Cai Xiao Li)
- 2006
  - 15th Asian Games
    - Silver - Women's Team
  - 5th South East Asian Championships
    - Gold - Women's Team
    - Gold - Women's Doubles (partner: Zhang Xueling)
    - Silver - Women's Singles
    - Silver - Mixed DOubles
  - Commonwealth Games
    - Gold - Women's Team
    - Silver - Women's Doubles (partner: Xu Yan)
    - Bronze - Mixed Doubles (partner: Ho Jia Ren Jason)
- 2005
  - ITTF Korea Open
    - 1st - Women's Doubles (partner: Zhang Xueling)
  - Asian Cup
    - 5th - Women's Singles
- 2004
  - Commonwealth Championships
    - Gold - Women's Team
    - Gold - Women's Doubles
    - Bronze - Women's Singles
  - Oylimpic Games
    - Top 16 - Women's Doubles (partner: Zhang Xueling)
- 2003
  - 22nd SEA Games
- 1997
  - Commonwealth Championships
    - Gold - Women's Team
    - Silver - Women's Singles
    - Silver - Women's Doubles
