= Zhang Xueling =

Chinese-born Singaporean table tennis player

Personal information
- Native name: 张雪玲
- Nationality: Singapore
- Born: 7 May 1983 (age 43) Beijing, China
- Height: 1.63 m (5 ft 4 in)
- Weight: 53 kg (117 lb)

Sport
- Sport: Table tennis
Medal record
Women's Table Tennis
Representing Singapore
Asian Games
| Silver medal – second place | 2006 Doha | Team |
| Bronze medal – third place | 2002 Busan | Team |
Commonwealth Games
| Gold medal – first place | 2002 Manchester | Team |
| Gold medal – first place | 2006 Melbourne | Singles |
| Gold medal – first place | 2006 Melbourne | Doubles |
| Gold medal – first place | 2006 Melbourne | Mixed doubles |
| Gold medal – first place | 2006 Melbourne | Team |
| Bronze medal – third place | 2002 Manchester | Doubles |
Southeast Asian Games
| Gold medal – first place | 2001 Kuala Lumpur | Team |
| Gold medal – first place | 2003 Vietnam | Team |
| Gold medal – first place | 2005 Manila | Singles |
| Gold medal – first place | 2005 Manila | Doubles |
| Gold medal – first place | 2005 Manila | Mixed doubles |
| Gold medal – first place | 2005 Manila | Team |
| Silver medal – second place | 2003 Vietnam | Singles |
| Silver medal – second place | 2003 Vietnam | Doubles |

Zhang Xueling (Chinese: 张雪玲; pinyin: Zhāng Xuělíng; born 7 May 1983 in Beijing, China) is a Chinese-born Singaporean table tennis player.

Zhang started playing table tennis at the age of 6 and made her first International appearance in 1999. She won four gold medals at the 2005 Southeast Asian Games, helping Singapore to sweep the women events as well as the mixed doubles.

Zhang has defeated her higher-ranked fellow Singaporean, Li Jiawei, 3 times to date: once at the 2005 Southeast Asian Games in the women's singles finals; another at the 2006 Commonwealth Games in the mixed doubles finals partnered by Cai Xiaoli against Li and her teammate, Yang Zi; and in the women's singles finals in the same Games, winning four out of five gold medals for the country.

In the Athens Olympics 2004, she went to the Games with no other target than to perform at her best. Zhang Xueling played her game and surprised the nation when she defeated 14th seed, Korea's Lee Eun Sil and Japan's Ai Fujinuma, to secure a position in the quarter-finals, before losing to Korea's Kim Hyang Mi.

However, Zhang has resigned in February, and has returned to Shanghai to join her husband, Zheng Qi. Zheng Qi was the Ex-Assistant Table Tennis Coach for the Singapore's Men's Team. Zhang's departure was due to Wang Yuegu, another Chinese-born Table Tennis Player, who has just received her Singaporean citizenship in February 2007.

== Achievements ==
- 1998
  - Golden Racket (VIE)
    - Gold - Women's Doubles
- 2001
  - 21st SEA Games
    - Gold - Women's Team
- 2002
  - 17th Commonwealth Games
    - Gold - Women's Team
    - Bronze - Women's Doubles
  - South East Asian Championships 2002
    - Gold - Women's Team
    - Gold Women's Singles
    - Silver - Mixed Doubles
  - 14th Asian Games
    - Bronze - Women's Team
- 2003
  - Southeast Asian Games
    - Silver - Women's Doubles (partner: Tan Paey Fern)
    - Gold - Women's Team
    - Silver - Women's Singles
  - Asian Championships
    - Bronze - Women's Team
- 2004
  - Olympic Games
    - Top 8 - Women's Singles
  - South East Asian Championships
    - Gold - Women's Team
    - Silver - Women's Doubles (partner: Tan Paey Fern)
- 2005
  - ITTF Pro Tour Korea Open
    - Gold - Women's Doubles (partner: Tan Paey Fern)
  - ITTF Pro Tour China Open
    - Silver - Women's Doubles (partner: Tan Paey Fern)
  - Singapore Sports Meritorious Senior Award
  - SEA Games
    - Gold - Women's Team
    - Gold - Women's Singles
    - Gold - Women's Doubles (partner: Li Jia Wei)
    - Gold - Mixed Doubles (partner: Yang Zi)
- 2006
  - 18th Commonwealth Games
    - Gold - Women's Team
    - Gold - Women's Singles
    - Gold - Women's Doubles (partner: Li Jia Wei)
    - Gold - Mixed Doubles (partner: Yang Zi)
  - South East Asian Championships 2006
    - Gold - Women's Team
    - Gold - Women's Singles
    - Gold - Women's Doubles (partner: Tan Paey Fern)
    - Gold - Mixed Doubles (partner: Yang Zi)
  - 15th Asian Games
    - Silver - Women's Team
