= Table tennis at the 2013 SEA Games =

- Venue: Wunna Theikdi Indoor Stadium
- Location: Naypyidaw, Myanmar
- Dates: 17–21 December

Table tennis at the 2013 SEA Games took place at Wunna Theikdi Indoor Stadium, Naypyidaw, Myanmar between December 17–21.

== Medal summary ==
=== Medal table ===
Rank	Nation	Gold	Silver	Bronze	Total
1	Singapore	4	1	1	6
2	Thailand	0	2	0	2
3	Vietnam	0	1	3	4
4	Malaysia	0	0	3	3
5	Philippines	0	0	1	1
Totals (5 entries)		4	4	8	16

=== Medalists ===
All events at the Games took the form of a knockout competition.

Event	Gold	Silver	Bronze
Men's singles	Zhan Jian; Singapore	Lê Tiến Đạt; Vietnam	Richard Gonzales; Philippines
Men's singles	Zhan Jian; Singapore	Lê Tiến Đạt; Vietnam	Clarence Chew; Singapore
Women's singles	Yu Mengyu; Singapore	Isabelle Li; Singapore	Wei Beh Lee; Malaysia
Women's singles	Yu Mengyu; Singapore	Isabelle Li; Singapore	Mai Hoàng Mỹ Trang; Vietnam
Men's team	Singapore; Chen Feng; Li Hu; Zhan Jian; Pang Xue Jie; Clarence Chew	Thailand; Chaisit Chaitat; Nikom Wongsiri; Padasak Tanviriyavechakul; Suchat Pitakgulsiri	Malaysia; Dunley Foo; Ee Hooi Chin; Muhamad Ashraf Haiqal; Muhd Shakirin Ibrahim
Men's team	Singapore; Chen Feng; Li Hu; Zhan Jian; Pang Xue Jie; Clarence Chew	Thailand; Chaisit Chaitat; Nikom Wongsiri; Padasak Tanviriyavechakul; Suchat Pitakgulsiri	Vietnam; Đào Duy Hoàng; Lê Tiến Đạt; Dương Văn Nam; Nguyễn Văn Ngọc
Women's team	Singapore; Yee Herng Hwee; Yu Mengyu; Isabelle Li; Lin Ye; Zhou Yihan	Thailand; Anisara Muangsuk; Nanthana Komwong; Piyaporn Pannak; Tamolwan Khetkhuan	Malaysia; Angeline Tang An Qi; Wei Beh Lee; You Lee Rou; Ho Ying
Women's team	Singapore; Yee Herng Hwee; Yu Mengyu; Isabelle Li; Lin Ye; Zhou Yihan	Thailand; Anisara Muangsuk; Nanthana Komwong; Piyaporn Pannak; Tamolwan Khetkhuan	Vietnam; Mai Hoàng Mỹ Trang; Phan Hoàng Tường Giang; Nguyễn Thị Việt Linh; Nguyễn Thị Nga

=== Finals ===
Category	Winners	Runners-up	Score
Men's singles	(Singapore) Zhan Jian	(Vietnam) Lê Tiến Đạt	11–6, 11–8, 11–7, 11–4
Men's Team	Singapore	Thailand	3–0
Women's singles	(Singapore) Yu Mengyu	(Singapore) Isabelle Li	11–8, 11–4, 11–6, 11–6
Women's Team	Singapore	Thailand	3–0
