= Table tennis at the 2017 SEA Games – Mixed doubles =

Table tennis – Mixed doubles at the 2017 SEA Games
- Venue: MiTEC Hall 7
- Dates: 20 August 2017
- Competitors: 28 from 7 nations

Medalists
gold medal	Padasak Tanviriyavechakul; Suthasini Sawettabut	Thailand
silver medal	Pang Xue Jie; Yu Mengyu	Singapore
bronze medal	Clarence Chew; Zhou Yihan	Singapore
bronze medal	Đinh Quang Linh; Mai Hoàng Mỹ Trang	Vietnam

The mixed doubles competition of the table tennis event at the 2017 SEA Games was held 20 August at MiTEC Hall 7 in Kuala Lumpur, Malaysia.

== Format ==
=== Doubles Events ===
(i) All Doubles events (Men's, Women's and Mixed) shall be played in a single knockout competition format. All matches shall be decided by best-of-five (5) games.

(ii) There will be no playoff match for 3rd and 4th positions. Both losing Semi-Finalists will receive a joint bronze medal each.

== Schedule ==
All times are Malaysian Time (UTC+08:00).

Date	Time	Round
Sunday, 20 August 2017	9:00	Round of 16
Sunday, 20 August 2017	9:30	Quarterfinals
Sunday, 20 August 2017	10:15	Semifinals
Sunday, 20 August 2017	14:00	Final

== Results ==
Source: Event Summary

Round of 16; 9:00
(Myanmar) Soe MO (Myanmar) Thin TK	4	6	5	0
(Malaysia) MSB Ibrahim (Malaysia) Ng SK	11	11	11	3
(Indonesia) DP Aji (Indonesia) L Indriani	11	11	11	3
(Philippines) JM Nayre (Philippines) ER Dael	9	4	7	0
(Vietnam) Tran TQ (Vietnam) Nguyen TN	6	6	8	0
(Singapore) Chew ZYC (Singapore) Zhou Y	11	11	11	3
(Singapore) Pang XJ (Singapore) Yu M	11	11	11	3
(Myanmar) Thet KKL (Myanmar) Naing NW	4	5	3	0
(Philippines) I Seronio (Philippines) JD Sy	13	8	3	6	1
(Thailand) S Wisutmaythangkoon (Thailand) N Komwong	11	11	11	11	3
(Malaysia) MAHM Rizal (Malaysia) Lee RY	11	11	11	3
(Indonesia) FS Santoso (Indonesia) G Dwijayanti	5	7	5	0

Quarterfinals; 9:30
(Thailand) P Tanviriyavechakul (Thailand) S Sawettabut	11	11	11	3
(Malaysia) MSB Ibrahim (Malaysia) Ng SK	1	7	6	0
(Indonesia) DP Aji (Indonesia) L Indriani	8	7	5	0
(Singapore) Chew ZYC (Singapore) Zhou Y	11	11	11	3
(Singapore) Pang XJ (Singapore) Yu M	11	13	10	11	3
(Thailand) S Wisutmaythangkoon (Thailand) N Komwong	7	11	12	6	1
(Malaysia) MAHM Rizal (Malaysia) Lee RY	11	6	9	10	1
(Vietnam) Dinh QL (Vietnam) Mai HMT	9	11	11	12	3

Semifinals; 10:15
(Thailand) P Tanviriyavechakul (Thailand) S Sawettabut	3	11	11	6	11	3
(Singapore) Chew ZYC (Singapore) Zhou Y	11	6	9	11	9	2
(Singapore) Pang XJ (Singapore) Yu M	11	11	11	3
(Vietnam) Dinh QL (Vietnam) Mai HMT	8	6	9	0

Finals; 14:00
(Thailand) P Tanviriyavechakul (Thailand) S Sawettabut	7	11	11	11	3
(Singapore) Pang XJ (Singapore) Yu M	11	9	6	8	1
