= Table tennis at the 2015 SEA Games =

Table tennis competition in Singapore

- Venue: Singapore Indoor Stadium, Kallang
- Dates: 1–8 June 2015
- Competitors: 67 from 9 nations

Table tennis at the 2015 SEA Games is being held in the Singapore Indoor Stadium, in Kallang, Singapore from 1 to 8 June 2015.

== Participating nations ==
A total of 67 athletes from nine nations are competing in table tennis at the 2015 Southeast Asian Games:

- Cambodia (5)
- Indonesia (8)
- Laos (6)
- Malaysia (8)
- Myanmar (5)
- Philippines (5)
- Singapore (10)
- Thailand (10)
- Vietnam (10)

== Competition schedule ==
The following is the competition schedule for the table tennis competitions:

P	Preliminaries	R16	Round of 16	¼	Quarterfinals	½	Semifinals	F	Final

Event↓/Date →	Mon 1		Tue 2		Wed 3			Thu 4			Fri 5	Sat 6	Sun 7	Mon 8	
Men's singles	P		P		P			P	½	F					
Women's singles			P		P			P	½	F					
Men's doubles	R16	¼	½	F											
Women's doubles	R16	¼	½	F											
Men's team												P	P	½	F
Women's team												P	P	½	F
Mixed doubles	R16				¼	½	F								

== Medalists ==
Event	Gold	Silver	Bronze
Men's singles	Gao Ning; Singapore	Richard Gonzales; Philippines	Chew Zhe Yu Clarence; Singapore
Men's singles	Gao Ning; Singapore	Richard Gonzales; Philippines	Padasak Tanviriyavechakul; Thailand
Men's doubles	Singapore (SIN); Gao Ning; Li Hu	Thailand (THA); Padasak Tanviriyavechakul; Chanakarn Udomsilp	Singapore (SIN); Chen Feng; Chew Zhe Yu Clarence
Men's doubles	Singapore (SIN); Gao Ning; Li Hu	Thailand (THA); Padasak Tanviriyavechakul; Chanakarn Udomsilp	Vietnam (VIE); Trần Tuấn Quỳnh; Nguyễn Anh Tú
Men's team	Singapore (SIN); Chen Feng; Chew Zhe Yu Clarence; Gao Ning; Li Hu; Yang Zi	Vietnam (VIE); Đinh Quang Linh; Dương Văn Nam; Lê Tiến Đạt; Nguyễn Anh Tú; Trần Tuấn Quỳnh	Indonesia (INA); Akhmad Dahlan Haruri; Gilang Maulana; Gilang Ramadhan; Ficky Supit Santoso
Men's team	Singapore (SIN); Chen Feng; Chew Zhe Yu Clarence; Gao Ning; Li Hu; Yang Zi	Vietnam (VIE); Đinh Quang Linh; Dương Văn Nam; Lê Tiến Đạt; Nguyễn Anh Tú; Trần Tuấn Quỳnh	Malaysia (MAS); Muhd Shakirin Ibrahim; Leong Chee Feng; Muhamad A. H.Muhamad R. Wong Chun Cheun
Women's singles	Suthasini Sawettabut; Thailand	Ng Sock Khim; Malaysia	Nguyễn Thị Nga; Vietnam
Women's singles	Suthasini Sawettabut; Thailand	Ng Sock Khim; Malaysia	Mai Hoàng Mỹ Trang; Vietnam
Women's doubles	Singapore (SIN); Lin Ye; Zhou Yihan	Singapore (SIN); Feng Tianwei; Yu Mengyu	Malaysia (MAS); Ho Ying; Lee Rou You
Women's doubles	Singapore (SIN); Lin Ye; Zhou Yihan	Singapore (SIN); Feng Tianwei; Yu Mengyu	Thailand (THA); Nanthana Komwong; Suthasini Sawettabut
Women's team	Singapore (SIN); Feng Tianwei; Li Si Yun Isabelle; Lin Ye; Yu Mengyu; Zhou Yihan	Thailand (THA); Tamolwan Khetkhuan; Nanthana Komwong; Piyaporn Pannak; Orawan Paranang; Suthasini Sawettabut	Malaysia (MAS); Ho Ying; Lee Rou You; Ng Sock Khim; Angeline Tang An Qi
Women's team	Singapore (SIN); Feng Tianwei; Li Si Yun Isabelle; Lin Ye; Yu Mengyu; Zhou Yihan	Thailand (THA); Tamolwan Khetkhuan; Nanthana Komwong; Piyaporn Pannak; Orawan Paranang; Suthasini Sawettabut	Vietnam (VIE); Mai Hoàng Mỹ Trang; Nguyễn Thị Nga; Pham Thi Thien Kim; Phan Hoàng Tường Giang; Vũ Thị Hà
Mixed doubles	Singapore (SIN); Yang Zi; Yu Mengyu	Thailand (THA); Padasak Tanviriyavechakul; Suthasini Sawettabut	Singapore (SIN); Li Hu; Zhou Yihan
Mixed doubles	Singapore (SIN); Yang Zi; Yu Mengyu	Thailand (THA); Padasak Tanviriyavechakul; Suthasini Sawettabut	Vietnam (VIE); Đinh Quang Linh; Mai Hoàng Mỹ Trang

== Medal table ==
* Host nation (Singapore)

Rank	Nation	Gold	Silver	Bronze	Total
1	Singapore (SIN)*	6	1	3	10
2	Thailand (THA)	1	3	2	6
3	Vietnam (VIE)	0	1	5	6
4	Malaysia (MAS)	0	1	3	4
5	Philippines (PHI)	0	1	0	1
6	Indonesia (INA)	0	0	1	1
Totals (6 entries)		7	7	14	28
