= Table tennis at the 2017 SEA Games =

- Venue: MiTEC Hall 7
- Dates: 20–26 August 2017
- Competitors: 75 from 9 nations

Table tennis at the 2017 SEA Games was held at the MiTEC Hall 7, Kuala Lumpur, Malaysia from 20 to 26 August 2017.

== Participating nations ==
A total of 75 athletes from nine nations competing in table tennis at the 2017 Southeast Asian Games:

- Cambodia (5)
- Indonesia (10)
- Laos (4)
- Malaysia (10)
- Myanmar (7)
- Philippines (10)
- Singapore (10)
- Thailand (9)
- Vietnam (10)

== Competition schedule ==
The following is the competition schedule for the table tennis competitions:

P	Preliminaries	R16	Round of 16	¼	Quarterfinals	½	Semifinals	F	Final

Event↓/Date →	Sun 20				Mon 21	Tue 22		Wed 23	Thu 24	Fri 25	Sat 26	
Men's singles					P	½	F					
Women's singles					P	½	F					
Men's doubles	R16	¼	½	F								
Women's doubles	R16	¼	½	F								
Mixed doubles	R16	¼	½	F								
Men's team									P	P	½	F
Women's team									P	P	½	F

== Medalists ==
Event	Gold	Silver	Bronze
Men's singles	Singapore; Gao Ning	Singapore; Clarence Chew	Thailand; Padasak Tanviriyavechakul
Men's singles	Singapore; Gao Ning	Singapore; Clarence Chew	Philippines; Richard Gonzales
Women's singles	Singapore; Feng Tianwei	Singapore; Zhou Yihan	Thailand; Nanthana Komwong
Women's singles	Singapore; Feng Tianwei	Singapore; Zhou Yihan	Thailand; Suthasini Sawettabut
Men's doubles	Singapore; Gao Ning; Pang Xue Jie	Singapore; Clarence Chew; Ethan Poh Shao Feng	Indonesia; Ficky Supit Santoso; M. Bima Abdi Negara
Men's doubles	Singapore; Gao Ning; Pang Xue Jie	Singapore; Clarence Chew; Ethan Poh Shao Feng	Thailand; Padasak Tanviriyavechakul; Supanut Wisutmaythangkoon
Women's doubles	Singapore; Feng Tianwei; Yu Mengyu	Singapore; Lin Ye; Zhou Yihan	Indonesia; Gustin Dwijayanti; Lilis Indriani
Women's doubles	Singapore; Feng Tianwei; Yu Mengyu	Singapore; Lin Ye; Zhou Yihan	Vietnam; Mai Hoàng Mỹ Trang; Nguyễn Thị Nga
Mixed doubles	Thailand; Padasak Tanviriyavechakul; Suthasini Sawettabut	Singapore; Pang Xue Jie; Yu Mengyu	Singapore; Clarence Chew Zhe Yu; Zhou Yihan
Mixed doubles	Thailand; Padasak Tanviriyavechakul; Suthasini Sawettabut	Singapore; Pang Xue Jie; Yu Mengyu	Vietnam; Đinh Quang Linh; Mai Hoàng Mỹ Trang
Men's team	Vietnam; Đinh Quang Linh; Nguyễn Anh Tú; Đoàn Bá Tuấn Anh; Nguyễn Đức Tuân; Trần Tuấn Quỳnh	Singapore; Clarence Chew; Gao Ning; Pang Xue Jie; Ethan Poh Shao Feng; Lucas Tan	Malaysia; Muhd Shakirin Ibrahim; Leong Chee Feng; Muhd Ashraf Haiqal Rizal; Wong Chun Cheun; Choong Javen
Men's team	Vietnam; Đinh Quang Linh; Nguyễn Anh Tú; Đoàn Bá Tuấn Anh; Nguyễn Đức Tuân; Trần Tuấn Quỳnh	Singapore; Clarence Chew; Gao Ning; Pang Xue Jie; Ethan Poh Shao Feng; Lucas Tan	Indonesia; Habibie Wahid; Ficky Supit Santoso; Donny Prasetya Aji; Deepash Anil Bhagwani; M. Bima Abdi Negara
Women's team	Singapore; Feng Tianwei; Yu Mengyu; Zhou Yihan; Lin Ye; Yee Herng Hwee	Thailand; Tamolwan Khetkhuan; Nanthana Komwong; Orawan Paranang; Jinnipa Sawettabut; Suthasini Sawettabut	Indonesia; Novita Oktariyani; Lilis Indriani; Kharisma Nur Hawwa; Hani Tri Azhari; Gustin Dwijayanti
Women's team	Singapore; Feng Tianwei; Yu Mengyu; Zhou Yihan; Lin Ye; Yee Herng Hwee	Thailand; Tamolwan Khetkhuan; Nanthana Komwong; Orawan Paranang; Jinnipa Sawettabut; Suthasini Sawettabut	Malaysia; Ng Sock Khim; Lee Rou You; Ho Ying; Ting Hie Phin; Alice Chang Li Sian

== Medal tally ==
* Host nation (Malaysia)

Rank	Nation	Gold	Silver	Bronze	Total
1	Singapore	5	6	1	12
2	Thailand	1	1	4	6
3	Vietnam	1	0	2	3
4	Indonesia	0	0	4	4
5	Malaysia*	0	0	2	2
6	Philippines	0	0	1	1
Totals (6 entries)		7	7	14	28

== See also ==
- Table tennis at the 2017 ASEAN Para Games
