= Table tennis at the 2017 SEA Games – Women's doubles =

Table tennis – Women's doubles at the 2017 SEA Games
- Venue: MiTEC Hall 7
- Dates: 20 August 2017
- Competitors: 26 from 7 nations

Medalists
| gold medal | Feng Tianwei; Yu Mengyu | Singapore |
| silver medal | Lin Ye; Zhou Yihan | Singapore |
| bronze medal | Gustin Dwijayanti; Lilis Indriani | Indonesia |
| bronze medal | Mai Hoàng Mỹ Trang; Nguyễn Thị Nga | Vietnam |

The women's doubles competition of the table tennis event at the 2017 SEA Games was held 20 August at MiTEC Hall 7 in Kuala Lumpur, Malaysia.

== Format ==
=== Doubles Events ===
(i) All Doubles events (Men’s, Women’s and Mixed) shall be played in a single knockout competition format. All matches shall be decided by best-of-five (5) games.

(ii) There will be no playoff match for 3rd and 4th positions. Both losing Semi-Finalists will receive a joint bronze medal each.

== Schedule ==
All times are Malaysian Time (UTC+08:00).

| Date | Time | Round |
|---|---|---|
| Sunday, 20 August 2017 | 15:00 | Round of 16 |
| Sunday, 20 August 2017 | 16:30 | Quarterfinals |
| Sunday, 20 August 2017 | 19:00 | Semifinals |
| Sunday, 20 August 2017 | 20:00 | Final |

== Results ==
Source: Event Summary

Round of 16; 15:00
(Philippines) SA Balatbat (Philippines) JD Sy | 11 | 3 | 7 | 0
(Malaysia) Ng SK (Malaysia) Ting HP | 13 | 11 | 11 | 3
(Indonesia) G Dwijayanti (Indonesia) L Indriani | 11 | 11 | 11 | 3
(Vietnam) Nguyen KDK (Vietnam) Vu TH | 8 | 3 | 5 | 0
(Malaysia) Ho Y (Malaysia) Lee RY | 11 | 11 | 11 | 3
(Myanmar) Naing NW (Myanmar) Thin TK | 4 | 9 | 4 | 0
(Philippines) ER Dael (Philippines) RJ Fadol | 8 | 5 | 5 | 0
(Vietnam) Mai HMT (Vietnam) Nguyen TN | 11 | 11 | 11 | 3
(Thailand) O Paranang (Thailand) S Sawettabut | 11 | 15 | 11 | 3
(Indonesia) KN Hawwa (Indonesia) N Oktariyani | 2 | 13 | 6 | 0

Quarterfinals; 16:30
(Singapore) Lin Y (Singapore) Zhou Y | 11 | 11 | 8 | 11 | 3
(Malaysia) Ng SK (Malaysia) Ting HP | 7 | 9 | 11 | 7 | 1
(Indonesia) G Dwijayanti (Indonesia) L Indriani | 12 | 11 | 6 | 11 | 3
(Thailand) N Komwong (Thailand) T Khetkhuan | 10 | 7 | 11 | 8 | 1
(Malaysia) Ho Y (Malaysia) Lee RY | 9 | 7 | 10 | 0
(Vietnam) Mai HMT (Vietnam) Nguyen TN | 11 | 11 | 12 | 3
(Thailand) O Paranang (Thailand) S Sawettabut | 11 | 11 | 5 | 9 | 1
(Singapore) Feng T (Singapore) Yu M | 6 | 13 | 11 | 11 | 3

Semifinals; 19:00
(Singapore) Lin Y (Singapore) Zhou Y | 11 | 11 | 8 | 11 | 3
(Indonesia) G Dwijayanti (Indonesia) L Indriani | 5 | 3 | 11 | 7 | 1
(Vietnam) Mai HMT (Vietnam) Nguyen TN | 7 | 11 | 2 | 7 | 1
(Singapore) Feng T (Singapore) Yu M | 11 | 9 | 11 | 11 | 3

Finals; 20:00
(Singapore) Lin Y (Singapore) Zhou Y | 8 | 9 | 13 | 11 | 6 | 2
(Singapore) Feng T (Singapore) Yu M | 11 | 11 | 11 | 9 | 11 | 3
