= Table tennis at the 2017 SEA Games – Women's singles =

Table tennis – Women's singles at the 2017 SEA Games
- Venue: MiTEC Hall 7
- Dates: 21–22 August 2017
- Competitors: 14 from 7 nations

Medalists
gold medal	Feng Tianwei (SGP)
silver medal	Zhou Yihan (SGP)
bronze medal	Nanthana Komwong (THA)
bronze medal	Suthasini Sawettabut (THA)

The women's singles competition of the table tennis events at the 2017 SEA Games is being held from 21 to 22 August at the MiTEC Hall 7 in Kuala Lumpur, Malaysia.

== Format ==
=== Singles Events ===
(i) All Singles events shall be played in two stages; Stage 1 Group Single Round Robin and Stage 2 Elimination competition comprising Semi-finals and Finals.

(ii) In Stage 1, athletes shall be divided into four groups, Groups A, B, C and D. Athletes in each Group shall play each other in a single round robin competition within each Group. Each match shall be decided by a best-offive sets format. Each athlete shall be awarded the following points for each match:

- Two points for a win.
- One point for a loss.

(iii) The winner in of each Group shall advance to the Stage 2 Semi-finals Elimination competition.

(iv) The winners of Group A and Group B shall be drawn for positions 1 and 4 respectively, whereas the winners of Group C and D shall be drawn for positions 2 or 3, taking into consideration separation of athletes from the same NOC. The matches shall be decided by best-of-seven games.

(v) The winners of the Elimination Semifinals competition shall qualify to play in the Finals for the gold medal.

(vi) There will be no playoff match for 3rd and 4th positions. Both losing SemiFinalists will receive a joint bronze medal each.

== Schedule ==
All times are Malaysian Time (UTC+08:00).

Date	Time	Round
21 August 2017	10:00	Preliminaries
22 August 2017	10:00	Semifinals
22 August 2017	14:00	Finals

== Results ==
=== Preliminary round ===
Source: Results (Groups) - Women's Singles

==== Group W ====
Player	Pld	W	L	GF	GA	PF	PA	Points
Suthasini Sawettabut (THA)	2	2	0	6	0	66	25	4
Lilis Indriani (INA)	2	1	1	3	4	65	71	3
Sendrina Andrea Balatbat (PHI)	2	0	2	1	6	43	78	2

21 Aug 10:00 - Table 3
Name	1	2	3	4	5	Match
Suthasini Sawettabut (THA)	11	11	11			3
Sendrina Andrea Balatbat (PHI)	2	2	1			0
Report

21 Aug 11:30 - Table 2
Name	1	2	3	4	5	Match
Lilis Indriani (INA)	11	10	13	11		3
Sendrina Andrea Balatbat (PHI)	8	12	11	7		1
Report

21 Aug 16:00 - Table 3
Name	1	2	3	4	5	Match
Suthasini Sawettabut (THA)	11	11	11			3
Lilis Indriani (INA)	8	8	4			0
Report

==== Group X ====
Player	Pld	W	L	GF	GA	PF	PA	Points
Nanthana Komwong (THA)	2	2	0	6	1	74	52	4
Ng Sock Khim (MAS)	2	1	1	4	3	68	58	3
Rose Jean Fadol (PHI)	2	0	2	0	6	34	66	2

21 Aug 10:00 - Table 3
Name	1	2	3	4	5	Match
Ng Sock Khim (MAS)	11	11	11			3
Rose Jean Fadol (PHI)	6	5	6			0
Report

21 Aug 11:30 - Table 4
Name	1	2	3	4	5	Match
Nanthana Komwong (THA)	11	11	11			3
Rose Jean Fadol (PHI)	8	7	2			0
Report

21 Aug 16:00 - Table 1
Name	1	2	3	4	5	Match
Ng Sock Khim (MAS)	8	11	9	7		1
Nanthana Komwong (THA)	11	8	11	11		3
Report

==== Group Y ====
Player	Pld	W	L	GF	GA	PF	PA	Points
Feng Tianwei (SGP)	3	3	0	9	0	103	39	6
Mai Hoang My Trang (VIE)	3	2	1	6	4	97	81	5
Gustin Dwijayanti (INA)	3	1	2	4	6	88	103	4
Thin Thin Khaing (MYA)	3	0	3	0	9	34	99	3

21 Aug 10:00 - Table 2
Name	1	2	3	4	5	Match
Mai Hoang My Trang (VIE)	9	11	11	19		3
Gustin Dwijayanti (INA)	11	5	4	17		1
Report

21 Aug 10:30 - Table 4
Name	1	2	3	4	5	Match
Feng Tianwei (SGP)	11	11	11			3
Thin Thin Khaing (MYA)	1	2	4			0
Report

21 Aug 14:00 - Table 3
Name	1	2	3	4	5	Match
Mai Hoang My Trang (VIE)	11	11	11			3
Thin Thin Khaing (MYA)	4	2	5			0
Report

21 Aug 14:00 - Table 1
Name	1	2	3	4	5	Match
Feng Tianwei (SGP)	15	11	11			3
Gustin Dwijayanti (INA)	13	4	1			0
Report

21 Aug 16:00 - Table 2
Name	1	2	3	4	5	Match
Mai Hoang My Trang (VIE)	4	6	4			0
Feng Tianwei (SGP)	11	11	11			3
Report

21 Aug 16:00 - Table 4
Name	1	2	3	4	5	Match
Thin Thin Khaing (MYA)	6	7	3			0
Gustin Dwijayanti (INA)	11	11	11			3
Report

==== Group Z ====
Player	Pld	W	L	GF	GA	PF	PA	Points
Zhou Yihan (SGP)	3	3	0	9	0	101	53	6
Nguyễn Thị Nga (VIE)	3	2	1	6	5	108	94	5
Lee Rou You (MAS)	3	1	2	5	7	104	106	4
Naing Naing Win (MYA)	3	0	3	1	9	46	106	3

21 Aug 10:30 - Table 3
Name	1	2	3	4	5	Match
Nguyễn Thị Nga (VIE)	11	11	11			3
Naing Naing Win (MYA)	1	3	8			0
Report

21 Aug 10:30 - Table 4
Name	1	2	3	4	5	Match
Zhou Yihan (SGP)	11	11	11			3
Lee Rou You (MAS)	1	8	8			0
Report

21 Aug 14:00 - Table 2
Name	1	2	3	4	5	Match
Nguyễn Thị Nga (VIE)	11	8	12	7	11	3
Lee Rou You (MAS)	6	11	10	11	9	2
Report

21 Aug 14:00 - Table 4
Name	1	2	3	4	5	Match
Zhou Yihan (SGP)	11	11	11			3
Naing Naing Win (MYA)	3	4	3			0
Report

21 Aug 16:30 - Table 1
Name	1	2	3	4	5	Match
Nguyễn Thị Nga (VIE)	9	6	11			0
Zhou Yihan (SGP)	11	11	13			3
Report

21 Aug 14:30 - Table 4
Name	1	2	3	4	5	Match
Lee Rou You (MAS)	11	11	7	11		3
Naing Naing Win (MYA)	1	8	11	4		1
Report

=== Knockout round ===
Semifinals; 22 August 10:00
Suthasini Sawettabut (THA)	3
Feng Tianwei (SGP)	4
Zhou Yihan (SGP)	4
Nanthana Komwong (THA)	0

Gold medal match 22 August 14:00
Feng Tianwei (SGP)	4
Zhou Yihan (SGP)	2

==== Semifinals ====
22 Aug 10:00 - Table 1
Name	1	2	3	4	5	6	7	Match
Suthasini Sawettabut (THA)	7	15	1	9	11	11	10	3
Feng Tianwei (SGP)	11	13	11	11	6	9	12	4
Report

22 Aug 10:00 - Table 2
Name	1	2	3	4	5	6	7	Match
Zhou Yihan (SGP)	11	12	11	11				4
Nanthana Komwong (THA)	4	10	8	7				0
Report

==== Gold Medal Match ====
22 Aug 14:00 - Table 1
Name	1	2	3	4	5	6	7	Match
Feng Tianwei (SGP)	9	11	7	11	12	13		4
Zhou Yihan (SGP)	11	6	11	9	10	11		2
Report
