= Table tennis at the 2015 SEA Games – Women's doubles =

Table tennis – Women's doubles at the 2015 SEA Games
- Venue: Singapore Indoor Stadium
- Dates: 1–2 June 2015
- Competitors: 26 from 8 nations

Medalists
gold medal	Lin Ye; Zhou Yihan	Singapore
silver medal	Feng Tianwei; Yu Mengyu	Singapore
bronze medal	Ho Ying; Lee Rou You	Malaysia
bronze medal	Nanthana; Suthasini	Thailand

The women's doubles competition of the table tennis event at the 2015 SEA Games was held from 1 to 2 June at the Singapore Indoor Stadium in Singapore.

== Schedule ==
Date	Time	Round
Monday, 1 June 2015	13:00	Round of 16
Monday, 1 June 2015	26:00	Quarterfinals
Tuesday, 2 June 2015	13:00	Semifinals
Tuesday, 2 June 2015	19:00	Final

== Results ==
Source: Event Summary

Round of 16; 1 June 13:00
Feng Tianwei (SIN); Yu Mengyu (SIN)
Bye
Mỹ Trang (VIE); Tường Giang (VIE)	0
Paranang (THA); Khetkhuan (THA)	3
Dwijayanti (INA); Hawwa (INA)	3
Balatbat (PHI); Lariba (PHI)	2
Bye
Ho (MAS); Lee (MAS)
Komwong (THA); Sawettabut (THA)	3
Oktariyani (INA); Indriani (INA)	1
Thị Nga (VIE); Thị Hà (VIE)	3
Sannivad (LAO); Douangpanya (LAO)	0
Ng S. (MAS); Tang (MAS)	3
San (MYA); Pyone (MYA)	0
Bye
Lin (SIN); Zhou (SIN)

Quarterfinal; 1 June 15:00
Feng Tianwei (SIN); Yu Mengyu (SIN)	3
Paranang (THA); Khetkhuan (THA)	0
Dwijayanti (INA); Hawwa (INA)	0
Ho (MAS); Lee (MAS)	3
Komwong (THA); Sawettabut (THA)	3
Thị Nga (VIE); Thị Hà (VIE)	1
Ng S. (MAS); Tang (MAS)	0
Lin (SIN); Zhou (SIN)	3

Semifinal; 2 June 13:00
Feng Tianwei (SIN); Yu Mengyu (SIN)	4
Ho (MAS); Lee (MAS)	0
Komwong (THA); Sawettabut (THA)	3
Lin (SIN); Zhou (SIN)	4

Gold medal match 2 June 19:00
Feng Tianwei (SIN); Yu Mengyu (SIN)	3
Lin (SIN); Zhou (SIN)	4
