= Table tennis at the 2017 SEA Games – Women's team =

Table tennis – Women's team at the 2017 SEA Games
- Venue: MiTEC Hall 7
- Dates: 24–26 August 2017
- Competitors: 33 from 7 nations

Medalists
gold medal	Singapore (SGP)
silver medal	Thailand (THA)
bronze medal	Indonesia (INA)
bronze medal	Malaysia (MAS)

The women's team competition of the table tennis event at the 2017 SEA Games will be held from 24 to 26 August at the MiTEC Hall 7 in Kuala Lumpur, Malaysia.

== Format ==
=== Team Events ===
(i) Team events shall be played based on the best-of-five games (four Singles and one doubles) with the following order of play:

	Team ABC		Team XYZ
Singles	Athlete A		Athlete X
Singles	Athlete B		Athlete Y
Doubles	Athlete C + A or B	vs	Athlete Z + X or Y
Singles	Athlete A or B (non-playing Doubles)		Athlete Z
Singles	Athlete C		Athlete X or Y (non-playing Doubles)

(ii) The competition shall be conducted in two stages: Stage 1 Group Single Round Robin and Stage 2 Elimination competition comprising Semi-finals and Finals.

(iii) In Stage 1, teams shall be divided into two groups, Groups A and B. Teams in each Group shall play each other in a single round robin competition within each Group. Each match in a game shall be decided by a best-of-five sets format. Each team shall be awarded the following points:

- Two points for a win.
- One point for a loss.

(iv) The top two ranked teams from each Group shall advance to the Stage 2 cross-over Semi-finals Elimination competition as follows:

- The top ranked team in Group A shall play against the second ranked team from Group B in Semi-finals 1.
- The top ranked team in Group B shall play against the second ranked team from Group A in Semi-finals 2.
- The winners of the Semi-finals 1 and 2 will qualify to play in the Finals for the gold medal.
- There will be no playoff match for 3rd and 4th positions. Both losing Semi-Finalists will receive a joint bronze medal.

== Schedule ==
All times are Malaysian Time (UTC+08:00).

Date	Time	Round
Thursday, 24 August 2017	11:00	Preliminaries
Friday, 25 August 2017	9:00	Preliminaries
Saturday, 26 August 2017	10:00	Semifinals
Saturday, 26 August 2017	15:00	Finals

== Results ==
=== Preliminary round ===
Source: Results (Groups) - Women's Team

==== Group A ====
Team	Pld	W	L	MF	MA	GF	GA	F-A	Pts
Singapore (SGP)	2	2	0	6	0	18	2	214:123	4
Indonesia (INA)	2	1	1	3	5	10	16	232:276	3
Vietnam (VIE)	2	0	2	2	6	9	19	246:293	2

24 August 2017; 11:00	Singapore	3–0	Indonesia

Report	Individual matches
Zhou Yihan	3–0	Novita Oktariyani	11 – 5, 11 – 7, 11 – 7
Lin Ye	3–0	Hani Tri Azhari	11 – 8, 12 – 10, 11 – 5
Feng Tianwei / Zhou Yihan	3–0	Novita Oktariyani / Kharisma Nur Hawwa	11 – 1, 11 – 7, 11 – 3

25 August 2017; 9:00	Singapore	3–0	Vietnam

Report	Individual matches
Feng Tianwei	3–1	Nguyễn Thị Nga	11 – 4, 7 – 11, 11 – 3, 11 – 2
Zhou Yihan	3–1	Mai Hoang My Trang	11 – 5, 11 – 9, 8 – 11, 11 – 9
Yu Mengyu / Zhou Yihan	3–0	Nguyễn Thị Nga / Vu Thi Ha	11 – 5, 11 – 7, 11 – 4

25 August 2017; 15:00	Vietnam	2–3	Indonesia

Report	Individual matches
Mai Hoang My Trang	3–0	Novita Oktariyani	11 – 4, 11 – 9, 11 – 3
Nguyễn Thị Nga	1–3	Gustin Dwijayanti	11 – 9, 6 – 11, 7 – 11, 7 – 11
Vu Thi Ha / Nguyễn Thị Nga	3–1	Gustin Dwijayanti / Lilis Indriani	11 – 8, 7 – 11, 11 – 8, 13 – 11
Mai Hoang My Trang	2–3	Lilis Indriani	10 – 12, 11 – 8, 11 – 6, 8 – 11, 8 – 11
Vu Thi Ha	0–3	Novita Oktariyani	5 – 11, 11 – 13, 6 – 11

==== Group Y ====
Team	Pld	W	L	MF	MA	GF	GA	F-A	Pts
Thailand (THA)	3	3	0	9	0	27	2	324:192	6
Malaysia (MAS)	3	2	1	6	4	20	13	340:272	5
Philippines (PHI)	3	1	2	4	6	15	22	318:346	4
Myanmar (MYA)	3	0	3	0	9	3	18	143:315	3

24 August 2017; 11:00	Thailand	3–0	Philippines

Report	Individual matches
Suthasini Sawettabut	3–0	Sendrina Andrea Balatbat	11 – 7, 11 – 3, 11 – 6
Orawan Paranang	3–2	Emy Rose Dael	10 – 12, 9 – 11, 12 – 10, 11 – 9, 11 – 5
Nanthana Komwong / Orawan Paranang	3–0	Emy Rose Dael / Rose Jean Fadol	11 – 8, 11 – 3, 11 – 6

24 August 2017; 11:00	Malaysia	3–0	Myanmar

Report	Individual matches
Ng Sock Khim	3–0	Thin Thin Khaing	11 – 4, 11 – 5, 11 – 4
Lee Rou You	3–0	Naing Naing Win	11 – 4, 11 – 8, 11 – 5
Ho Ying / Lee Rou You	3–0	Naing Naing Win / Yin Wai Khaing	11 – 4, 11 – 4, 11 – 7

25 August 2017; 9:00	Thailand	3–0	Malaysia

Report	Individual matches
Suthasini Sawettabut	3–0	Ng Sock Khim	12 – 10, 11 – 8, 11 – 8
Tamolwan Khetkhuan	3–0	Lee Rou You	11 – 7, 17 – 15, 11 – 9
Tamolwan Khetkhuan / Orawan Paranang	3–0	Ho Ying / Lee Rou You	11 – 8, 11 – 8, 11 – 6

25 August 2017; 9:00	Philippines	3–0	Myanmar

Report	Individual matches
Sendrina Andrea Balatbat	3–1	Naing Naing Win	11 – 4, 9 – 11, 11 – 6, 11 – 5
Emy Rose Dael	3–1	Thin Thin Khaing	11 – 5, 9 – 11, 11 – 3, 11 – 7
Emy Rose Dael / Rose Jean Fadol	3–0	Yin Wai Khaing / Thin Thin Khaing	11 – 9, 11 – 3, 11 – 1

25 August 2017; 15:00	Thailand	3–0	Myanmar

Report	Individual matches
Orawan Paranang	3–0	Naing Naing Win	11 – 6, 11 – 4, 11 – 3
Jinnipa Sawettabut	3–0	Yin Wai Khaing	11 – 4, 11 – 6, 11 – 4
Orawan Paranang / Tamolwan Khetkhuan	3–0	Thin Thin Khaing / Naing Naing Win	11 – 4, 11 – 1, 11 – 1

25 August 2017; 15:00	Malaysia	3–1	Philippines

Report	Individual matches
Ng Sock Khim	3–0	Sendrina Andrea Balatbat	17 – 15, 11 – 5, 11 – 6
Lee Rou You	2–3	Emy Rose Dael	11 – 5, 11 – 9, 10 – 12, 8 – 11, 8 – 11
Ho Ying / Lee Rou You	3–1	Sendrina Andrea Balatbat / Jamaica Dianne Sy	11 – 7, 11 – 3, 9 – 11, 11 – 9
Ng Sock Khim	3–0	Jamaica Dianne Sy	11 – 3, 11 – 9, 11 – 5

=== Knockout round ===
Source: Results - Women's Team

Semifinals; 26 August 10:00
Singapore	3
Malaysia	0
Indonesia	0
Thailand	3

Gold medal match 26 August 15:00
Singapore	3
Thailand	0

==== Semifinals ====
26 August 2017; 10:00	Singapore	3–0	Malaysia

Report	Individual matches
Yu Mengyu	3–0	Lee Rou You	11 – 9, 11 – 3, 11 – 6
Lin Ye	3–1	Ho Ying	11 – 3, 11 – 7, 9 – 11, 11 – 3
Yu Mengyu / Zhou Yihan	3–0	Ting Hie Phin / Lee Rou You	13 – 11, 11 – 5, 11 – 7

26 August 2017; 10:00	Indonesia	0–3	Thailand

Report	Individual matches
Gustin Dwijayanti	1–3	Suthasini Sawettabut	11 – 7, 6 – 11, 3 – 11, 5 – 11
Novita Oktariyani	1–3	Nanthana Komwong	7 – 11, 11 – 6, 8 – 11, 10 – 12
Lilis Indriani / Novita Oktariyani	1–3	Nanthana Komwong / Orawan Paranang	5 – 11, 6 – 11, 11 – 6, 9 – 11

==== Gold medal match ====
26 August 2017; 15:00	Singapore	3–0	Thailand

Report	Individual matches
Feng Tianwei	3–1	Suthasini Sawettabut	7 – 11, 11 – 3, 11 – 7, 11 – 8
Yu Mengyu	3–1	Tamolwan Khetkhuan	11 – 13, 11 – 8, 11 – 4, 11 – 6
Zhou Yihan / Yu Mengyu	3–0	Tamolwan Khetkhuan / Orawan Paranang	11 – 7, 11 – 2, 11 – 2
