= Table tennis at the 2015 SEA Games – Men's singles =

Table tennis – Men's singles at the 2015 SEA Games
- Venue: Singapore Indoor Stadium
- Dates: 1–4 June 2015
- Competitors: 18 from 9 nations

Medalists
gold medal	Gao Ning (SIN)
silver medal	Richard Gonzales (PHI)
bronze medal	Padasak Tanviriyavechakul (THA)
bronze medal	Clarence Chew (SIN)

The men's singles competition of the table tennis events at the 2015 SEA Games is being held from 1 to 4 June at the Singapore Indoor Stadium in Singapore.

== Schedule ==
Date	Time	Round
1 June 2015	16:30	Preliminaries
2 June 2015	16:00	Preliminaries
3 June 2015	13:40	Preliminaries
4 June 2015	11:20	Preliminaries
4 June 2015	15:50	Semifinals
4 June 2015	19:50	Finals

== Results ==
=== Preliminary round ===
Source: Results (Groups) - Men's Singles

==== Group A ====
Player	Pld	W	L	GF	GA	PF	PA	Points
Padasak Tanviriyavechakul (THA)	3	3	0	9	1	124	90	6
Lê Tiến Đạt (VIE)	3	2	1	7	3	66	86	5
Lat Thet Ko Ko (MYA)	3	1	2	3	8	49	119	4
Ryan Rodney Jacolo (PHI)	3	0	2	2	9	41	115	3

2 Jun 16:00
Name	1	2	3	4	5	6	7	Match
Lê Tiến Đạt (VIE)	11	11	11					3
Lat Thet Ko Ko (MYA)	5	7	7					0

2 Jun 16:00
Name	1	2	3	4	5	6	7	Match
Padasak Tanviriyavechakul (THA)	14	11	11					3
Ryan Rodney Jacolo (PHI)	12	5	6					0

3 Jun 15:30
Name	1	2	3	4	5	6	7	Match
Lê Tiến Đạt (VIE)	11	11	11					3
Rodney Jacolo (PHI)	7	3	8					0

3 Jun 15:30
Name	1	2	3	4	5	6	7	Match
Padasak Tanviriyavechakul (THA)	14	11	14					3
Lat Thet Ko Ko (MYA)	12	6	12					0

4 Jun 11:20
Name	1	2	3	4	5	6	7	Match
Lê Tiến Đạt (VIE)	18	4	8	7				1
Padasak Tanviriyavechakul (THA)	16	11	11	11				3

4 Jun 11:20
Name	1	2	3	4	5	6	7	Match
Lat Thet Ko Ko (MYA)	2	11	9	12	12			3
Rodney Jacolo (PHI)	11	5	11	10	10			2

==== Group B ====
Player	Pld	W	L	GF	GA	PF	PA	Points
Ibrahim Muhd Shakirin (MAS)	2	2	0	6	0	66	41	4
Clarence Chew (SIN)	2	2	0	6	1	72	38	4
Phinith Kongphet (LAO)	2	0	2	1	6	50	72	2
Saravey Nay (CAM)	2	0	2	0	3	29	66	2

2 Jun 16:00
Name	1	2	3	4	5	6	7	Match
Clarence Chew (SIN)	6	11	11	11				3
Phinith Kongphet (LAO)	11	7	6	3				1

2 Jun 16:00
Name	1	2	3	4	5	6	7	Match
Ibrahim Muhd Shakirin (MAS)	11	11	11					3
Saravey Nay (CAM)	6	4	8					0

3 Jun 15:30
Name	1	2	3	4	5	6	7	Match
Clarence Chew (SIN)	11	11	11					3
Saravey Nay (CAM)	3	3	5					0

3 Jun 15:30
Name	1	2	3	4	5	6	7	Match
Ibrahim Muhd Shakirin (MAS)	11	11	11					3
Phinith Kongphet (LAO)	7	8	8					0

==== Group C ====
Player	Pld	W	L	GF	GA	PF	PA	Points
Richard Gonzales (PHI)	3	3	0	9	2	116	79	6
Trần Tuấn Quỳnh (VIE)	3	2	1	6	3	88	79	5
Ficky Supit Santoso (INA)	4	2	2	5	6	137	125	6
Muhamad A. H. (MAS)	3	1	2	3	7	84	99	4
Thavisack Phathaphone (LAO)	3	0	3	1	9	63	106	3

1 Jun 16:30
Name	1	2	3	4	5	6	7	Match
Richard Gonzales (PHI)	11	11	11					3
Thavisack Phathaphone (LAO)	2	4	4					0

1 Jun 16:30
Name	1	2	3	4	5	6	7	Match
Muhamad R. Muhamad A. H. (MAS)	9	6	10					0
Ficky Supit Santoso (INA)	11	11	12					3

2 Jun 16:40
Name	1	2	3	4	5	6	7	Match
Muhamad R. Muhamad A. H. (MAS)	6	9	4					0
Trần Tuấn Quỳnh (VIE)	11	11	11					3

2 Jun 16:40
Name	1	2	3	4	5	6	7	Match
Richard Gonzales (PHI)	6	11	11	6	12			3
Ficky Supit Santoso (INA)	11	7	8	11	10			2

3 Jun 13:40
Name	1	2	3	4	5	6	7	Match
Trần Tuấn Quỳnh (VIE)	11	11	11					3
Ficky Supit Santoso (INA)	6	9	8					0

3 Jun 13:40
Name	1	2	3	4	5	6	7	Match
Muhamad R. Muhamad A. H. (MAS)	11	7	11	11				3
Thavisack Phathaphone (LAO)	7	11	8	6				1

3 Jun 16:10
Name	1	2	3	4	5	6	7	Match
Richard Gonzales (PHI)	11	11	15					3
Trần Tuấn Quỳnh (VIE)	3	6	13					0

3 Jun 16:10
Name	1	2	3	4	5	6	7	Match
Thavisack Phathaphone (LAO)	4	8	9					0
Ficky Supit Santoso (INA)	11	11	11					3

==== Group D ====
Player	Pld	W	L	GF	GA	PF	PA	Points
Chaisit Chaitat (THA)	3	2	1	7	3	100	81	5
Gao Ning (SIN)	2	2	0	6	0	66	36	4
Gilang Maulana (INA)	2	2	0	6	1	74	49	4
Tun Myo Min (MYA)	3	0	3	0	9	47	100	3
Lim Sok Long (CAM)	2	0	2	0	6	48	69	2

1 Jun 16:30
Name	1	2	3	4	5	6	7	Match
Gao Ning (SIN)	11	11	11					3
Lim Sok Long (CAM)	8	7	8					0

1 Jun 16:30
Name	1	2	3	4	5	6	7	Match
Chaisit Chaitat (THA)	11	11	11					3
Tun Myo Min (MYA)	8	7	8					0

2 Jun 16:40
Name	1	2	3	4	5	6	7	Match
Chaisit Chaitat (THA)	7	7	11	6				1
Gilang Maulana (INA)	11	11	7	11				3

2 Jun 16:40
Name	1	2	3	4	5	6	7	Match
Gao Ning (SIN)	11	11	11					3
Tun Myo Min (MYA)	4	3	6					0

3 Jun 13:40
Name	1	2	3	4	5	6	7	Match
Gilang Maulana (INA)	11	12	11					3
Tun Myo Min (MYA)	3	10	5					0

3 Jun 13:40
Name	1	2	3	4	5	6	7	Match
Chaisit Chaitat (THA)	14	11	11					3
Lim Sok Long (CAM)	12	5	8					0

=== Knockout round ===
Semifinals; 4 June 15:50
Padasak Tanviriyavechakul (THA)	2
Gao Ning (SIN)	4
Richard Gonzales (PHI)	4
Clarence Chew (SIN)	3

Gold-medal match 4 June 19:50
Gao Ning (SIN)	4
Richard Gonzales (PHI)	1

==== Semifinals ====
4 Jun 15:50
Name	1	2	3	4	5	6	7	Match
Padasak Tanviriyavechakul (THA)	11	3	12	6	6	11		2
Gao Ning (SIN)	9	11	10	11	11	13		4

4 Jun 15:50
Name	1	2	3	4	5	6	7	Match
Richard Gonzales (PHI)	11	10	8	9	11	11	12	4
Clarence Chew (SIN)	4	12	11	11	9	4	10	3

==== Gold-medal match ====
4 Jun 19:50
Name	1	2	3	4	5	6	7	Match
Gao Ning (SIN)	11	11	9	11	11			4
Richard Gonzales (PHI)	6	9	11	8	3			1
