= Table tennis at the 2013 SEA Games – Men's team =

The men's team table tennis event was part of the table tennis programme and took place between December 17 and 19, at the Wunna Theikdi Indoor Stadium, Naypyidaw, Myanmar.

== Schedule ==
All times are Myanmar Standard Time (UTC+06:30)

Date	Time	Event
Tuesday, 17 December 2013	09:00	Preliminary round 1
Tuesday, 17 December 2013	14:00	Preliminary round 2
Wednesday, 18 December 2013	10:45	Preliminary round 3
Thursday, 19 December 2013	09:00	Semifinals
Thursday, 19 December 2013	14:00	Final

== Results ==
=== Preliminary round ===
==== Group A ====
Team	Pld	W	L	MF	MA	GF	GA	F-A	Pts
Singapore	3	3	0	9	0	27	0	299-168	6
Malaysia	3	2	1	6	5	20	22	373-386	5
Indonesia	3	1	2	5	6	21	21	396-391	4
Laos	3	0	3	0	9	8	28	190-313	3

17 December 2013	Singapore	3–0	Malaysia

Li Hu	3–0	Muhamad Ashraf Haiqal	11-9, 11-9, 11-6
Zhan Jian	3–0	Muhd Shakirin Ibrahim	11-4, 11-8, 11-4
Chen Feng / Zhan Jian	3–0	Ee Hooi Chin / Muhamad Ashraf Haiqal	11-2, 11-5, 11-6

17 December 2013	Indonesia	3–0	Laos

Yon Mardi Yono	3–1	Thavisack Phathaphone	7-11, 13-11, 11-5, 11-9
Akhmad Dahlan Haruri	3–0	Phinith Kongphet	11-4, 11-7, 11-7
Yon Mardi Yono / Glang Maulana	3–0	Soulichack Phannavong / Thavisack Phathaphone	11-6, 11-5, 12-10

17 December 2013	Singapore	3–0	Indonesia

Zhan Jian	3–0	Ficky Supit Santoso	11-4, 11-6, 11-5
Li Hu	3–0	Glang Maulana	11-7, 11-7, 11-9
Chen Feng / Zhan Jian	3–0	Yon Mardi Yono / Glang Maulana	11-9, 11-5, 11-9

17 December 2013	Malaysia	3–0	Laos

Muhamad Ashraf Haiqal	3–0	Phinith Kongphet	12-10, 11-8, 11-4
Muhd Shakirin Ibrahim	3–0	Thavisack Phathaphone	11-6, 11-6, 11-6
Muhamad Ashraf Haiqal / Dunley Foo	3–1	Soulichack Phannavong / Thavisack Phathaphone	11-1, 11-5, 3-11, 11-4

18 December 2013	Singapore	3–0	Laos

Chen Feng	3–0	Thavisack Phathaphone	13-11, 11-2, 11-7
Clarence Chew	3–0	Phinith Kongphet	11-8, 11-7, 11-5
Xue Jie Pang / Chen Feng	3–0	Thavisack Phathaphone / Piyadeth Sourinphoumy	11-4, 11-3, 11-7

18 December 2013	Indonesia	2–3	Malaysia

Ficky Supit Santoso	2–3	Muhd Shakirin Ibrahim	12-10, 9-11, 11-5, 7-11, 9-11
Yon Mardi Yono	2–3	Muhamad Ashraf Haiqal	8-11, 11-5, 9-11, 11-9, 11-13
Yon Mardi Yono / Akhmad Dahlan Haruri	3–2	Muhamad Ashraf Haiqal / Dunley Foo	9-11, 11-9, 11-6, 12-14, 11-9
Ficky Supit Santoso	3–0	Dunley Foo	11-8, 12-10, 14-12
Akhmad Dahlan Haruri	2–3	Muhd Shakirin Ibrahim	9-11, 11-4, 11-4, 5-11, 1-11

==== Group B ====
Team	Pld	W	L	MF	MA	GF	GA	F-A	Pts
Thailand	3	3	0	9	0	27	10	372-274	6
Vietnam	3	2	1	6	4	24	14	381-336	5
Myanmar	3	1	2	3	7	16	24	349-396	4
Cambodia	3	0	3	2	9	12	31	349-445	3

17 December 2013	Thailand	3–0	Myanmar

Chaisit Chaitat	3–1	Aung Htut	11-3, 11-4, 11-13, 11-6
Padasak Tanviriyavechakul	3–1	Kyi Than	11-7, 9-11, 11-7, 11-6
Chaisit Chaitat / Nikom Wongsiri	3–2	Thet Ko Ko Latt / Aung Htut	11-4, 11-8, 8-11, 5-11, 11-6

17 December 2013	Vietnam	3–1	Cambodia

Nguyen Van Ngoc	2–3	Sok Long Lim	14-12, 9-11, 11-9, 7-11, 12-14
Le Tien Dat	3–0	Tola Soeung	11-5, 11-8, 11-6
Duong Van Nam / Hoang Dao Duy	3–0	Sroy Huor Oeung / Tola Soeung	11-7, 11-5, 11-7
Duong Van Nam	3–1	Sok Long Lim	11-6, 6-11, 11-6, 13-11

17 December 2013	Thailand	3–0	Vietnam

Padasak Tanviriyavechakul	3–0	Le Tien Dat	11-7, 11-8, 11-8
Chaisit Chaitat	3–2	Duong Van Nam	11-9, 8-11, 10-12, 11-4, 11-9
Chaisit Chaitat / Nikom Wongsiri	3–2	Duong Van Nam / Hoang Dao Duy	11-3, 11-5, 9-11, 3-11, 11-9

17 December 2013	Myanmar	3–1	Cambodia

Kyi Than	2–3	Sok Long Lim	11-8, 16-14, 8-11, 6-11, 6-11
Thet Ko Ko Latt	3–1	Sroy Huor Oeung	11-1, 11-9, 10-12, 11-9
Thet Ko Ko Latt / Aung Htut	3–1	Sroy Huor Oeung / Tola Soeung	8-11, 11-8, 11-4, 11-7
Kyi Than	3–1	Tola Soeung	10-12, 11-8, 11-7, 11-7

18 December 2013	Vietnam	3–0	Myanmar

Le Tien Dat	3–0	Kyi Than	11-7, 11-5, 11-4
Hoang Dao Duy	3–1	Thet Ko Ko Latt	15-13, 11-6, 11-13, 11-9
Duong Van Nam / Le Tien Dat	3–0	Thet Ko Ko Latt / Aung Htut	11-8, 11-6, 11-7

18 December 2013	Thailand	3–0	Cambodia

Nikom Wongsiri	3–0	Tola Soeung	11-3, 11-6, 11-9
Suchat Pitakgulsiri	3–2	Sok Long Lim	4-11, 13-11, 6-11, 11-2, 11-4
Suchat Pitakgulsiri / Padasak Tanviriyavechakul	3–0	Sroy Huor Oeung / Tola Soeung	11-2, 11-5, 11-6

=== Knockout round ===
Semifinals
A1	Singapore	3
B2	Vietnam	0
A2	Malaysia	0
B1	Thailand	3

Final
A1	Singapore	3
B1	Thailand	0

==== Semifinals ====
19 December 2013	Singapore	3–0	Vietnam

Zhan Jian	3–1	Le Tien Dat	11-3, 10-12, 12-10, 11-8
Li Hu	3–1	Duong Van Nam	3-11, 11-4, 11-5, 11-9
Chen Feng / Zhan Jian	3–0	Duong Van Nam / Nguyen Van Ngoc	11-5, 11-8, 11-2

19 December 2013	Malaysia	0–3	Thailand

Muhd Shakirin Ibrahim	2–3	Chaisit Chaitat	12-10, 9-11, 12-10, 10-12, 8-11
Muhamad Ashraf Haiqal	0–3	Padasak Tanviriyavechakul	2-11, 6-11, 4-11
Dunley Foo / Muhd Shakirin Ibrahim	1–3	Chaisit Chaitat / Nikom Wongsiri	8-11, 11-7, 8-11, 7-11

==== Final ====
19 December 2013	Singapore	3–0	Thailand

Zhan Jian	3–2	Nikom Wongsiri	11-9, 8-11, 11-4, 7-11, 11-4
Li Hu	3–0	Padasak Tanviriyavechakul	11-5, 11-8, 11-7
Chen Feng / Zhan Jian	3–0	Chaisit Chaitat / Nikom Wongsiri	11-4, 11-4, 11-1
