= Table tennis at the 2015 SEA Games – Men's doubles =

Table tennis – Men's doubles at the 2015 SEA Games
- Venue: Singapore Indoor Stadium
- Dates: 1–2 June 2015
- Competitors: 30 from 9 nations

Medalists
gold medal	Gao Ning; Li Hu	Singapore
silver medal	Padasak; Chanakarn	Thailand
bronze medal	Chen Feng; Clarence Chew	Singapore
bronze medal	Trần Tuấn Quỳnh; Nguyễn Anh Tú	Vietnam

The men's doubles competition of the table tennis event at the 2015 SEA Games was held from 1 to 2 June at the Singapore Indoor Stadium in Singapore.

== Schedule ==
Date	Time	Round
Monday, 1 June 2015	13:40	Round of 16
Monday, 1 June 2015	15:40	Quarterfinals
Tuesday, 2 June 2015	13:50	Semifinals
Tuesday, 2 June 2015	19:50	Final

== Results ==
Source: Event Summary

Round of 16; 1 June 13:40
Gao Ning (SIN); Li Hu (SIN)
Bye
Maulana (INA); Haruri (INA)	3
Wongsiri (THA); Chaitat (THA)	0
Lim (CAM); Nay (CAM)	3
Lat (MYA); Tun (MYA)	1
Anh Tú (VIE); Tuấn Quỳnh (VIE)	3
Muhamad (MAS); Ibrahim (MAS)	1
Tanviriyavechakul (THA); Udomsilp (THA)	3
Soeung (CAM); Oeung (CAM)	0
Văn Nam (VIE); Quang Linh (VIE)	3
Kongphet (LAO); Phathaphone (LAO)	0
Wong (MAS); Leong (MAS)	1
Gonzales (PHI); Valle (PHI)	3
Santoso (INA); Ramadhan (INA)	1
Chen Feng (SIN); Clarence Chew (SIN)	3

Quarterfinal; 1 June 15:40
Gao Ning (SIN); Li Hu (SIN)	3
Maulana (INA); Haruri (INA)	0
Lim (CAM); Nay (CAM)	0
Anh Tú (VIE); Tuấn Quỳnh (VIE)	3
Tanviriyavechakul (THA); Udomsilp (THA)	3
Văn Nam (VIE); Quang Linh (VIE)	2
Gonzales (PHI); Valle (PHI)	1
Chen Feng (SIN); Clarence Chew (SIN)	3

Semifinal; 2 June 13:50
Gao Ning (SIN); Li Hu (SIN)	4
Anh Tú (VIE); Tuấn Quỳnh (VIE)	0
Tanviriyavechakul (THA); Udomsilp (THA)	4
Chen Feng (SIN); Clarence Chew (SIN)	3

Gold medal match 2 June 19:50
Gao Ning (SIN); Li Hu (SIN)	4
Tanviriyavechakul (THA); Udomsilp (THA)	0
