= Zhou Yihan =

Chinese-born Singaporean table tennis player

Personal information
- Native name: 周一涵
- Nationality: Singapore
- Born: 30 January 1994 (age 32) Shenyang, Liaoning, China
- Height: 1.68 m (5 ft 6 in)
- Weight: 55 kg (121 lb; 8.7 st)

Sport
- Sport: Table tennis
- Current ranking: 28 (January 2017)
Medal record
Women's Table Tennis
Representing Singapore
Asian Games
Bronze medal – third place	2014 Incheon	Team
Commonwealth Games
Gold medal – first place	2014 Glasgow	Team
Southeast Asian Games
Gold medal – first place	2013 Naypyidaw	Team
Gold medal – first place	2015 Singapore	Team
Gold medal – first place	2015 Singapore	Doubles
Gold medal – first place	2017 Kuala Lumpur	Team
Silver medal – second place	2017 Kuala Lumpur	Singles
Silver medal – second place	2017 Kuala Lumpur	Doubles
Bronze medal – third place	2015 Singapore	Mixed Doubles
Bronze medal – third place	2017 Kuala Lumpur	Mixed Doubles

Zhou Yihan (Chinese: 周一涵; pinyin: Zhōu Yīhán; born 30 January 1994) is a Chinese-born Singaporean table tennis player. Born in China, she moved to Singapore in 2009 via the Foreign Sports Talent Scheme. She was eligible to play in 2011.

Zhou won a team gold at the 2014 Commonwealth Games and a team Bronze at the 2014 Asian Games.

On 2 June 2015, Zhou and her compatriot, Lin Ye, defeated top seed, Feng Tianwei and Yu Mengyu 4–3 to clinch the Women Doubles title in 28th Southeast Asian Games held in Singapore. The pair continued their good momentum and caused one of the biggest upset in history when they defeated the top doubles pair Ding Ning and Liu Shiwen 3–0 in ITTF World Tour, Japan Open Semi-Final but lost to another China pair of Wu Yang and Liu Fei in Final.

== 2016 Summer Olympics ==
Zhou was selected and debuted as the third player for the women's team by the Singapore Table Tennis Association for the Olympics. The Singapore women's team, comprising Zhou, Yu Mengyu and Feng Tianwei, reached the semi-final of the team event but lost to China 0–3. In the bronze medal match, the trio was defeated by Japan 1–3.

Team Event

Date	Round	Result	Opponent	Score
12 August	Round of 16	Win	Egypt	3-0
13 August	Quarter-Final	Win	South Korea	3-2
15 August	Semi-Final	Loss	China	0-3
16 August	Bronze Medal match	Loss	Japan	1-3
