= Table tennis at the 2015 SEA Games – Women's singles =

Table tennis – Women's singles at the 2015 SEA Games
- Venue: Singapore Indoor Stadium
- Dates: 2–4 June 2015
- Competitors: 16 from 8 nations

Medalists
| gold medal | Suthasini Sawettabut | Thailand |
| silver medal | Ng Sock Khim | Malaysia |
| bronze medal | Mai Hoàng Mỹ Trang | Vietnam |
| bronze medal | Nguyễn Thị Nga | Vietnam |

The women's singles competition of the table tennis event at the 2015 SEA Games was held from 2 to 4 June at the Singapore Indoor Stadium in Singapore.

== Schedule ==
| Date | Time | Round |
|---|---|---|
| Tuesday, 2 June 2015 | 14:40 | Preliminaries |
| Wednesday, 3 June 2015 | 14:10 | Preliminaries |
| Thursday, 4 June 2015 | 10:00 | Preliminaries |
| Thursday, 4 June 2015 | 15:00 | Semifinals |
| Thursday, 4 June 2015 | 19:00 | Finals |

== Results ==
=== Preliminary round ===
Source: Results (Groups) - Women's Singles

==== Group A ====
| Player | Pld | W | L | GF | GA | PF | PA | Points |
|---|---|---|---|---|---|---|---|---|
| Nguyễn Thị Nga (VIE) | 3 | 3 | 0 | 9 | 2 | 121 | 93 | 6 |
| Isabelle Li Si Yun (SIN) | 3 | 2 | 1 | 8 | 3 | 116 | 78 | 5 |
| Seangdavieng Douangpanya (LAO) | 3 | 1 | 2 | 3 | 6 | 81 | 79 | 4 |
| San Khin Kaung (MYA) | 3 | 0 | 3 | 0 | 9 | 31 | 99 | 3 |

| 2 June 2015; 14:40; Report | Li Si Yun (SIN) | 3–0 | Kaung (MYA) | Singapore Indoor Stadium; Match 1 |
| 2 June 2015; 14:40; Report | 11–4, 11–1, 11–1 |

| 2 June 2015; 14:40; Report | Douangpanya (LAO) | 0–3 | Thị Nga (VIE) | Singapore Indoor Stadium; Match 2 |
| 2 June 2015; 14:40; Report | 9–11, 11–13, 9–11 |

| 3 June 2015; 14:10; Report | Li Si Yun (SIN) | 2–3 | Thị Nga (VIE) | Singapore Indoor Stadium; Match 11 |
| 3 June 2015; 14:10; Report | 11–9, 10–12, 11–7, 12–14, 6–11 |

| 3 June 2015; 14:10; Report | Douangpanya (LAO) | 3–0 | Kaung (MYA) | Singapore Indoor Stadium; Match 12 |
| 3 June 2015; 14:10; Report | 11–7, 11–1, 11–3 |

| 4 June 2015; 10:00; Report | Li Si Yun (SIN) | 3–0 | Douangpanya (LAO) | Singapore Indoor Stadium; Match 19 |
| 4 June 2015; 10:00; Report | 11–4, 11–7, 11–8 |

| 4 June 2015; 10:00; Report | Kaung (MYA) | 0–3 | Thị Nga (VIE) | Singapore Indoor Stadium; Match 18 |
| 4 June 2015; 10:00; Report | 3–11, 4–11, 7–11 |

==== Group B ====
| Player | Pld | W | L | GF | GA | PF | PA | Points |
|---|---|---|---|---|---|---|---|---|
| Mai Hoàng Mỹ Trang (VIE) | 3 | 3 | 0 | 9 | 0 | 100 | 55 | 6 |
| Lee Rou You (MAS) | 3 | 2 | 1 | 6 | 4 | 93 | 70 | 5 |
| Sendrina Balatbat (PHI) | 3 | 1 | 2 | 4 | 6 | 81 | 97 | 4 |
| Thipphalak Sannivad (LAO) | 3 | 0 | 3 | 0 | 9 | 54 | 106 | 3 |

| 2 June 2015; 14:40; Report | Mỹ Trang (VIE) | 3–0 | Balatbat (PHI) | Singapore Indoor Stadium; Match 3 |
| 2 June 2015; 14:40; Report | 11–7, 11–5, 11–6 |

| 2 June 2015; 14:40; Report | Rou You (MAS) | 3–0 | Sannivad (LAO) | Singapore Indoor Stadium; Match 4 |
| 2 June 2015; 14:40; Report | 11–5, 11–3, 11–5 |

| 3 June 2015; 14:10; Report | Mỹ Trang (VIE) | 3–0 | Sannivad (LAO) | Singapore Indoor Stadium; Match 9 |
| 3 June 2015; 14:10; Report | 11–4, 12–10, 11–2 |

| 3 June 2015; 14:10; Report | Rou You (MAS) | 3–1 | Balatbat (PHI) | Singapore Indoor Stadium; Match 10 |
| 3 June 2015; 14:10; Report | 11–4, 6–11, 11–6, 11–3 |

| 4 June 2015; 10:00; Report | Mỹ Trang (VIE) | 3–0 | Rou You (MAS) | Singapore Indoor Stadium; Match 17 |
| 4 June 2015; 10:00; Report | 11–7, 11–6, 11–8 |

| 4 June 2015; 10:00; Report | Balatbat (PHI) | 3–0 | Sannivad (LAO) | Singapore Indoor Stadium; Match 20 |
| 4 June 2015; 10:00; Report | 17–15, 11–5, 11–5 |

==== Group C ====
| Player | Pld | W | L | GF | GA | PF | PA | Points |
|---|---|---|---|---|---|---|---|---|
| Suthasini Sawettabut (THA) | 3 | 3 | 0 | 9 | 1 | 110 | 73 | 6 |
| Feng Tianwei (SIN) | 3 | 2 | 1 | 7 | 3 | 103 | 66 | 5 |
| Ian Lariba (PHI) | 3 | 1 | 2 | 3 | 6 | 70 | 87 | 4 |
| Novita Oktariyani (INA) | 3 | 0 | 3 | 0 | 9 | 42 | 99 | 3 |

| 2 June 2015; 15:20; Report | Tianwei (SIN) | 3–0 | Lariba (PHI) | Singapore Indoor Stadium; Match 5 |
| 2 June 2015; 15:20; Report | 11–6, 11–6, 11–2 |

| 2 June 2015; 15:20; Report | Sawettabut (THA) | 3–0 | Oktariyani (INA) | Singapore Indoor Stadium; Match 6 |
| 2 June 2015; 15:20; Report | 11–1, 11–7, 11–5 |

| 3 June 2015; 14:50; Report | Tianwei (SIN) | 3–0 | Oktariyani (INA) | Singapore Indoor Stadium; Match 15 |
| 3 June 2015; 14:50; Report | 11–3, 11–1, 11–5 |

| 3 June 2015; 14:50; Report | Sawettabut (THA) | 3–0 | Lariba (PHI) | Singapore Indoor Stadium; Match 16 |
| 3 June 2015; 14:50; Report | 11–6, 12–10, 11–7 |

| 4 June 2015; 10:40; Report | Tianwei (SIN) | 1–3 | Sawettabut (THA) | Singapore Indoor Stadium; Match 21 |
| 4 June 2015; 10:40; Report | 11–9, 10–12, 7–11, 9–11 |

| 4 June 2015; 10:40; Report | Lariba (PHI) | 3–0 | Oktariyani (INA) | Singapore Indoor Stadium; Match 22 |
| 4 June 2015; 10:40; Report | 11–5, 11–8, 11–7 |

==== Group D ====
| Player | Pld | W | L | GF | GA | PF | PA | Points |
|---|---|---|---|---|---|---|---|---|
| Ng Sock Khim (MAS) | 3 | 3 | 0 | 9 | 2 | 114 | 79 | 6 |
| Komwong Nanthana (THA) | 3 | 2 | 1 | 8 | 4 | 120 | 84 | 5 |
| Gustin Dwijayanti (INA) | 3 | 1 | 2 | 4 | 6 | 82 | 85 | 4 |
| Pyone Aye Thida (MYA) | 3 | 0 | 3 | 0 | 9 | 31 | 99 | 3 |

| 2 June 2015; 15:20; Report | Komwong (THA) | 3–1 | Dwijayanti (INA) | Singapore Indoor Stadium; Match 7 |
| 2 June 2015; 15:20; Report | 12–10, 11–4, 7–11, 11–4 |

| 2 June 2015; 15:20; Report | Ng Sock (MAS) | 3–0 | Pyone (MYA) | Singapore Indoor Stadium; Match 8 |
| 2 June 2015; 15:20; Report | 11–6, 11–3, 11–4 |

| 3 June 2015; 14:50; Report | Komwong (THA) | 3–0 | Pyone (MYA) | Singapore Indoor Stadium; Match 13 |
| 3 June 2015; 14:50; Report | 11–4, 11–3, 11–2 |

| 3 June 2015; 14:50; Report | Ng Sock (MAS) | 3–0 | Dwijayanti (INA) | Singapore Indoor Stadium; Match 14 |
| 3 June 2015; 14:50; Report | 13–11, 11–3, 11–6 |

| 4 June 2015; 10:40; Report | Komwong (THA) | 2–3 | Ng Sock (MAS) | Singapore Indoor Stadium; Match 23 |
| 4 June 2015; 10:40; Report | 11–6, 9–11, 8–11, 11–7, 7–11 |

| 4 June 2015; 10:40; Report | Dwijayanti (INA) | 3–0 | Pyone (MYA) | Singapore Indoor Stadium; Match 24 |
| 4 June 2015; 10:40; Report | 11–2, 11–3, 11–4 |

=== Knockout round ===
Source: Results - Women's Singles

Semifinals; 4 June 15:00
Thị Nga (VIE) | 0
Ng Sock (MAS) | 4
Sawettabut (THA) | 4
Mỹ Trang (VIE) | 3

Gold medal match 4 June 19:00
Ng Sock (MAS) | 3
Sawettabut (THA) | 4

==== Semifinals ====
| 4 June 2015; 15:00; Report | Thị Nga (VIE) | 0–4 | Ng Sock (MAS) | Singapore Indoor Stadium; Match 25 |
| 4 June 2015; 15:00; Report | 8–11, 12–14, 7–11, 4–11 |

| 4 June 2015; 15:00; Report | Sawettabut (THA) | 4–3 | Mỹ Trang (VIE) | Singapore Indoor Stadium; Match 26 |
| 4 June 2015; 15:00; Report | 16–18, 10–12, 9–11, 13–11, 11–5, 11–9, 11–9 |

==== Gold medal match ====
| 4 June 2015; 19:00; Report | Ng Sock (MAS) | 3–4 | Sawettabut (THA) | Singapore Indoor Stadium; Match 27 |
| 4 June 2015; 19:00; Report | 11–7, 5–11, 8–11, 11–9, 6–11, 11–9, 4–11 |
