= Table tennis at the 2021 SEA Games – Men's team =

Table tennis – Men's team at the 2021 SEA Games
- Venue: Hải Dương Gymnasium
- Dates: 13–15 May 2022
- Competitors: 20 from 6 nations

Medalists
gold medal	Thailand (THA)
silver medal	Malaysia (MAS)
bronze medal	Singapore (SGP)
bronze medal	Vietnam (VIE)

The men's team competition of the table tennis event at the 2021 SEA Games will be held from 13th to 15th May at the Hải Dương Gymnasium in Hải Dương, Vietnam.

== Schedule ==
All times are Vietnam Time (UTC+07:00).

Date	Time	Round
Friday, 13 May 2022	10:00	Preliminaries
Saturday, 14 May 2022	14:30	Semifinals
Sunday, 15 May 2022	19:30	Finals

== Results ==
=== Preliminary round ===
Source: Results (Groups) - Men's Team

==== Group A ====
Team	Pld	W	L	MF	MA	GF	GA
Singapore (SGP)	2	2	0	6	1	18	4
Malaysia (MAS)	2	1	1	3	3	9	11
Philippines (PHI)	2	0	2	1	6	6	19

13 May 2022; 10:00	Singapore	3–1	Philippines

Report	Individual matches
Clarence Chew Zhe Yu	1–3	Jann Mari Martinez Nayre	11 - 5, 4 - 11, 13 - 15, 6 - 11
Koen Pang Yew En	3–0	Richard Pugoy Gonzales
Ethan Poh Shao Feng	3–1	John Russell Picondo Misal
Clarence Chew Zhe Yu	3–0	Richard Pugoy Gonzales

13 May 2022; 14:30	Singapore	3–0	Malaysia

Report	Individual matches
Clarence Chew Zhe Yu	3–0	Javen Choong
Koen Pang Yew En	3–0	Leong Chee Feng
Ethan Poh Shao Feng	3–0	Wong Qi Shen

13 May 2022; 19:30	Malaysia	3–0	Philippines

Report	Individual matches
Leong Chee Feng	3–0	Richard Pugoy Gonzales
Wong Qi Shen	3–1	Jann Mari Martinez Nayre
Javen Choong	3–1	John Russell Picondo Misal

==== Group B ====
Team	Pld	W	L	MF	MA	GF	GA
Vietnam (VIE)	2	2	0	6	0	18	5
Thailand (THA)	2	1	1	3	3	14	9
Cambodia (CAM)	2	0	2	0	6	0	18

13 May 2022; 10:00	Thailand	3–0	Cambodia

Report	Individual matches
Padasak Tanviriyavechakul	3–0	Sarak Sou Pring	11 - 7, 11 - 5, 11 - 3
. Phakpoom Sanguansin	3–0	Soeung Tola	11 - 2, 11 - 5, 11 - 9
Sarayut Tancharoen	3–0	Kang Yukhang	11 - 3

13 May 2022; 14:30	Thailand	0–3	Vietnam

Report	Individual matches
Padasak Tanviriyavechakul	2–3	Nguyễn Anh Tú	11 - 5, 11 - 8, 6 - 11, 7 - 11, 9 - 11
Phakpoom Sanguansin	2–3	Nguyễn Đức Tuân	6 - 11, 11 - 8, 11 - 13, 14 - 12, 4 - 11
Pattaratorn Passara	1–3	Đinh Anh Hoàng	9 - 11, 11 - 8, 6 - 11, 4 - 11

13 May 2022; 19:31	Vietnam	3–0	Cambodia

Report	Individual matches
Nguyễn Anh Tú	3–0	Soeung Tola
Nguyễn Đức Tuân	3–0	Sarak Sou Pring
Đinh Anh Hoàng	3–0	Bun Visal

=== Knockout round ===
Source: Results - Men's Team

Semifinals; 14 May 14:30
Singapore	1
Thailand	3
Malaysia	3
Vietnam	1

Gold medal match 15 May 19:30
Thailand	3
Malaysia	1

==== Semifinals ====
14 May 2021; 14:30	Singapore	1–3	Thailand

Report	Individual matches
Koen Pang Yew En	1–3	Padasak Tanviriyavechakul	8 - 11, 11 - 5, 10 - 12, 8 - 11
Clarence Chew Zhe Yu	3–0	Phakpoom Sanguansin	11 - 9, 12 - 10, 11 - 7
Ethan Poh Shao Feng	0–3	Sarayut Tancharoen	10 - 12, 8 - 11, 5 - 11
Clarence Chew Zhe Yu	2–3	Padasak Tanviriyavechakul	9 - 11, 9 - 11, 11 - 6, 11 - 3, 5 - 11

14 May 2022; 14:30	Malaysia	3–1	Vietnam

Report	Individual matches
Leong Chee Feng	3–2	Nguyễn Đức Tuân	9 - 11, 11 - 6, 7 - 11, 11 - 8, 11 - 7
Wong Qi Shen	1–3	Nguyễn Anh Tú	11 - 6, 3 - 11, 2 - 11, 6 - 11
Javen Choong	3–0	Đinh Anh Hoàng	11 - 8, 11 - 7, 11 - 8
Leong Chee Feng	3–2	Nguyen Anh Tu	6 - 11, 12 - 10, 6 - 11, 11 - 8, 12 - 10

==== Gold medal match ====
15 May 2021; 19:30	Thailand	3–1	Malaysia

Report	Individual matches
Phakpoom Sanguansin	1–3	Leong Chee Feng	11 - 7, 8 - 11, 8 - 11, 5 - 11
Padasak Tanviriyavechakul	3–0	Wong Qi Shen	11 - 8, 11 - 6, 11 - 4
Sarayut Tancharoen	3–0	Javen Choong	12 - 10, 11 - 4, 11 - 7
Padasak Tanviriyavechakul	3–2	Leong Chee Feng	9 - 11, 11 - 7, 8 - 11, 11 - 8, 14 - 12
