= Chen Feng (table tennis) =

Chinese-born Singaporean table tennis player

Personal information
- Nationality: Singapore
- Born: 24 March 1994 (age 32) Hebei, China
- Height: 1.75 m (5 ft 9 in)
- Weight: 75 kg (165 lb; 11.8 st)

Sport
- Sport: Table tennis
- Playing style: Right-handed Shakehand grip
Medal record
Men's Table Tennis
Representing Singapore
Southeast Asian Games
Gold medal – first place	2013 Naypyidaw	Team
Gold medal – first place	2015 Singapore	Team
Bronze medal – third place	2015 Singapore	Doubles

Chen Feng (born 24 March 1994) is a Chinese-born Singaporean former table tennis player. Born in Hebei, China, he moved to Singapore. Chen became a Singapore citizen in 2013. Chen became eligible to play for his new country in 2013 via the Foreign Sports Talent Scheme.

== Southeast Asian Games ==
Chen was a sparring partner for the 2011 Southeast Asian Games. His Southeast Asian Games debut is in 2013 where he won a team gold at the 2013 Southeast Asian Games. At the 2015 Southeast Asian Games, he won the bronze medal with his doubles partner Clarence Chew. Besides the doubles event, he also participated in the team event as well. On the concluding day of table tennis event, he and his team won Gold in the Men's Team event by beating Vietnam 3-1.

== Asian Games ==
Chen made his debut for the Asian Games at the 2014 Asian Games. During the team round-robin match against China, he defeated newly crowned Youth Olympics Gold Medalist Fan Zhendong of China 3-2 despite being ranked lower than him. He and his team finished a joint 5th spot. He also participated in the doubles event with Yang Zi which they reach the last 16.

== Olympic Games ==
Chen's Olympic debut would be in Rio 2016. He successfully booked his singles spot by winning the Southeast Asian region qualifying berth, held in Hong Kong. Throughout the competition, he defeated senior-ranked teammates Gao Ning and Li Hu.

== Retirement ==
Chen retired from professional table tennis in 2017 to spend time with his mother, who is in ill health.
