= Table tennis at the 2015 SEA Games – Mixed doubles =

Table tennis – Mixed doubles at the 2015 SEA Games
- Venue: Singapore Indoor Stadium
- Dates: 1–3 June 2015
- Competitors: 32 from 8 nations

Medalists
gold medal	Yu Mengyu; Yang Zi	Singapore
silver medal	Sawettabut; Tanviriyavechakul	Thailand
bronze medal	Zhou Yihan; Li Hu	Singapore
bronze medal	Đinh Quang Linh; Mai Hoàng Mỹ Trang	Vietnam

The mixed doubles competition of the table tennis event at the 2015 SEA Games was held from 1 to 3 June at the Singapore Indoor Stadium in Singapore.

== Schedule ==
Date	Time	Round
Monday, 1 June 2015	19:00	Round of 16
Wednesday, 3 June 2015	13:00	Quarterfinals
Wednesday, 3 June 2015	17:30	Semifinals
Wednesday, 3 June 2015	20:00	Final

== Results ==
Source: Event Summary

Round of 16; 1 June 19:00
Li Hu (SIN); Zhou Yihan (SIN)	3
Lat (MYA); San (MYA)	0
Anh Tú (VIE); Tường Giang (VIE)	3
Leong (MAS); Ho (MAS)	1
Haruri (INA); Dwijayanti (INA)	3
Kongphet (LAO); Sannivad (LAO)	0
Lariba (PHI); Valle (PHI)	0
Sawettabut (THA); Tanviriyavechakul (THA)	3
Chaitat (THA); Komwong (THA)	1
Quang Linh (VIE); Mỹ Trang (VIE)	3
Ramadhan (INA); Hawwa (INA)	0
Ibrahim (MAS); Lee (MAS)	3
Phathaphone (LAO); Douangpanya (LAO)	2
Balatbat (PHI); Jacolo (PHI)	3
Pyone (MYA); Tun (MYA)	0
Yang Zi (SIN); Yu Mengyu (SIN)	3

Quarterfinal; 3 June 13:00
Li Hu (SIN); Zhou Yihan (SIN)	3
Anh Tú (VIE); Tường Giang (VIE)	0
Haruri (INA); Dwijayanti (INA)	0
Sawettabut (THA); Tanviriyavechakul (THA)	3
Quang Linh (VIE); Mỹ Trang (VIE)	3
Ibrahim (MAS); Lee (MAS)	2
Balatbat (PHI); Jacolo (PHI)	0
Yang Zi (SIN); Yu Mengyu (SIN)	3

Semifinal; 3 June 17:30
Li Hu (SIN); Zhou Yihan (SIN)	3
Sawettabut (THA); Tanviriyavechakul (THA)	4
Quang Linh (VIE); Mỹ Trang (VIE)	1
Yang Zi (SIN); Yu Mengyu (SIN)	4

Gold medal match 3 June 20:00
Sawettabut (THA); Tanviriyavechakul (THA)	0
Yang Zi (SIN); Yu Mengyu (SIN)	4
