= Padasak Tanviriyavechakul =

Thai table tennis player (born 1995)

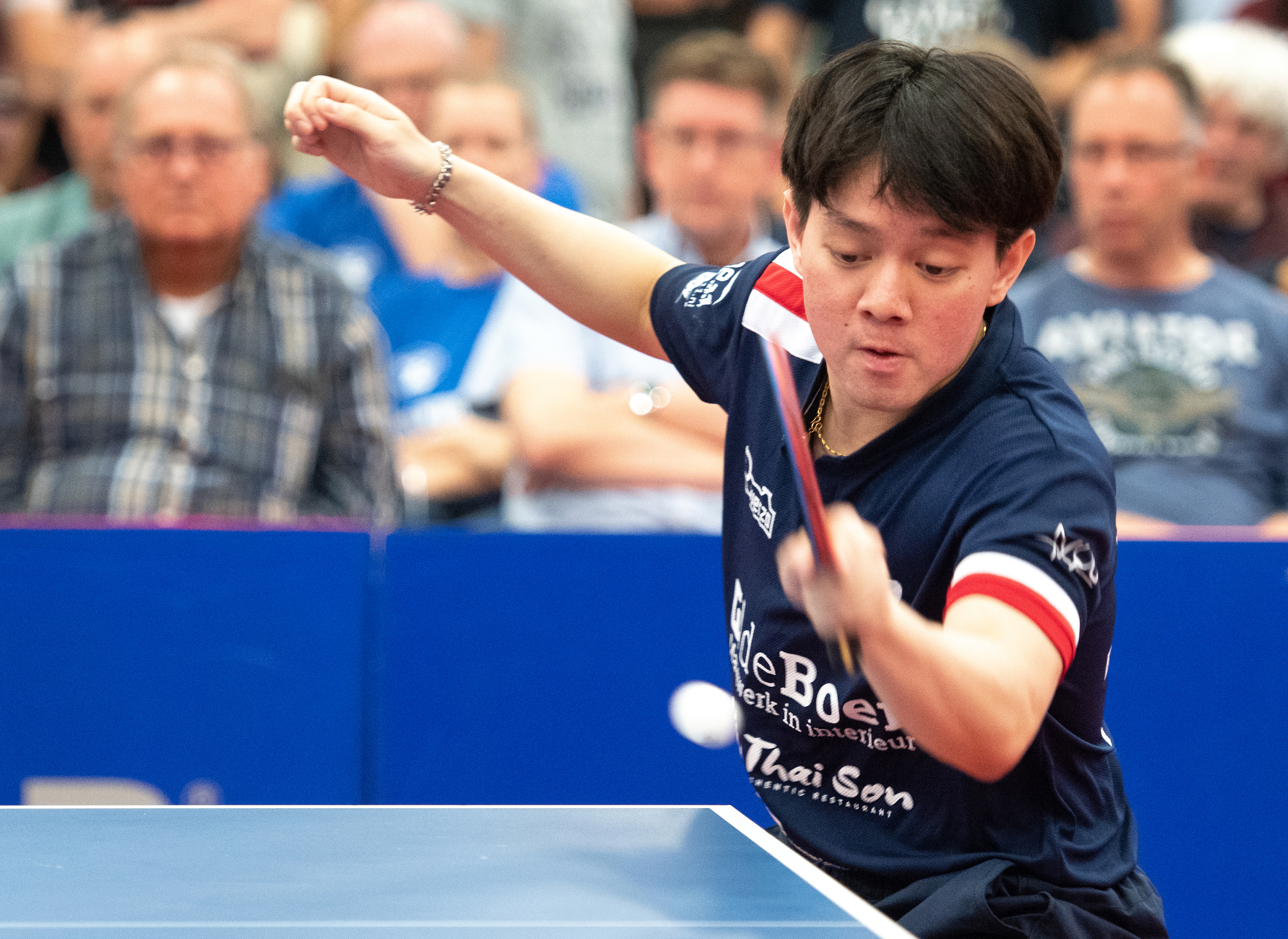

Personal information
- Native name: ภาดาศักดิ์ ตันวิริยะเวชกุล
- Born: 17 May 1995 (age 31) Bangkok, Thailand
- Height: 1.68 m (5 ft 6 in)
- Weight: 55 kg (121 lb; 8.7 st)

Sport
- Sport: Table tennis
- Playing style: Left-handed, Shakehand grip
Medal record
Men's Table Tennis
Representing Thailand
Event	1st	2nd	3rd
SEA Games	2	3	5
Total	2	3	5
SEA Games
Gold medal – first place	2017 Kuala Lumpur	Mixed doubles
Gold medal – first place	2021 Vietnam	Team
Silver medal – second place	2013 Myanmar	Team
Silver medal – second place	2015 Singapore	Doubles
Silver medal – second place	2015 Singapore	Mixed doubles
Bronze medal – third place	2015 Singapore	Singles
Bronze medal – third place	2017 Kuala Lumpur	Singles
Bronze medal – third place	2017 Kuala Lumpur	Doubles
Bronze medal – third place	2019 Philippines	Singles
Bronze medal – third place	2021 Vietnam	Mixed doubles

Padasak Tanviriyavechakul (Thai: ภาดาศักดิ์ ตันวิริยะเวชกุล; RTGS: Phadasak Tanwiriyawetchakun, born 17 May 1995) is a Thai table tennis player.

Padasak started playing table tennis at the age of 8. Padasak participated in the 2010 Summer Youth Olympics and the 2014 Summer Youth Olympics.
