= Yu Mengyu =

Chinese-born Singaporean table tennis player

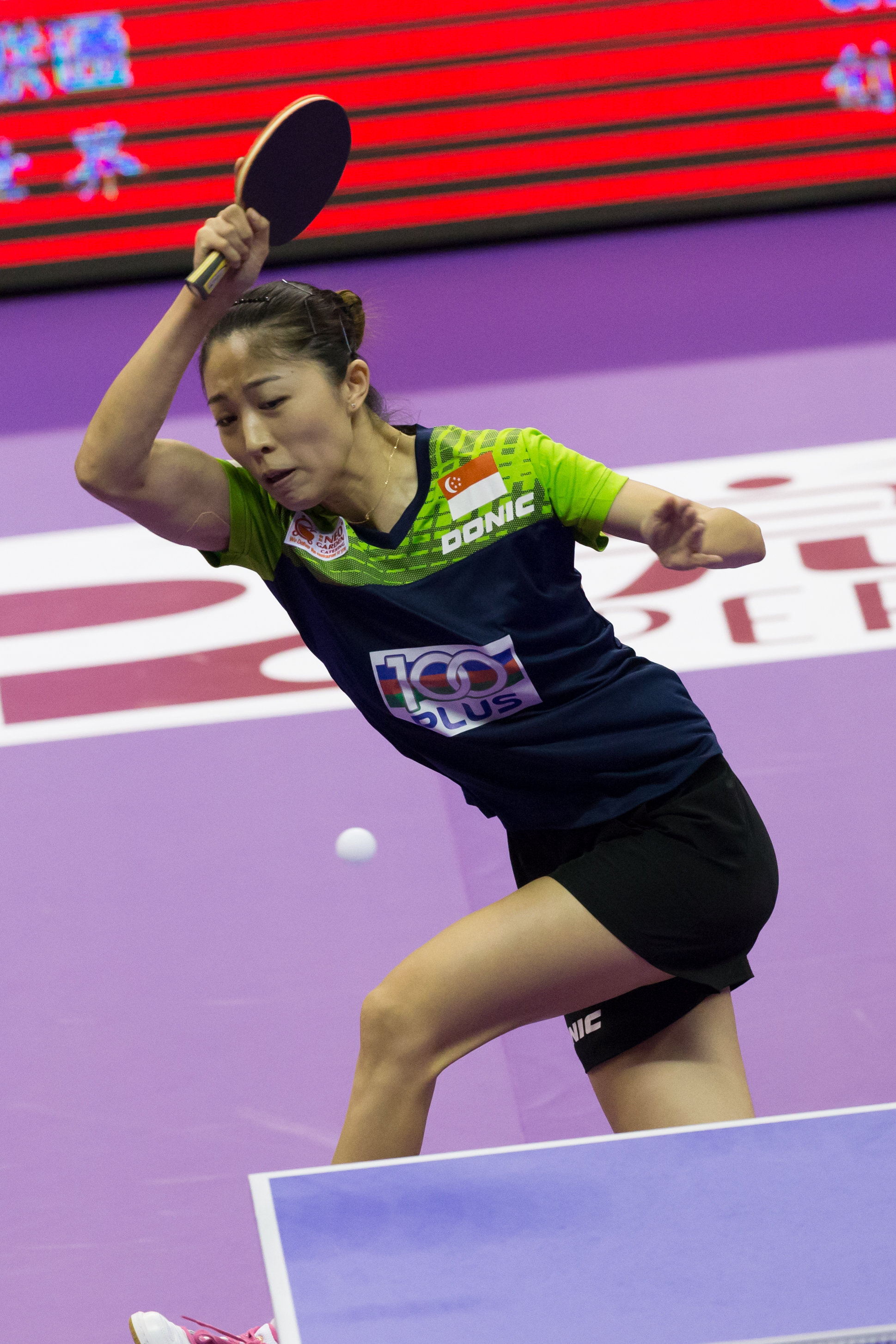
- Yu in 2016

Personal information
- Native name: 于梦雨
- Nationality: Singapore
- Born: 18 August 1989 (age 37) Liaoning, China
- Height: 1.66 m (5 ft 5 1/2 in)
- Weight: 50 kg (110 lb; 7.9 st)

Sport
- Sport: Table tennis
- Playing style: Right-handed, shakehand grip
- Highest ranking: 9 (March 2010)
- Current ranking: 24 (14 March 2022)
Medal record
Women's Table Tennis
Representing Singapore
Event	1st	2nd	3rd
World Championships	1	2	4
World Cup	0	2	3
Asian Games	0	1	2
Asian Championships	0	4	4
Asian Cup	0	0	1
Commonwealth Games	5	4	0
Southeast Asian Games	10	2	0
Total	16	15	14
World Championships
Gold medal – first place	2010 Moscow	Team
Silver medal – second place	2008 Guangzhou	Team
Silver medal – second place	2012 Dortmund	Team
Bronze medal – third place	2013 Paris	Doubles
Bronze medal – third place	2014 Tokyo	Team
Bronze medal – third place	2015 Suzhou	Doubles
Bronze medal – third place	2017 Düsseldorf	Doubles
World Cup
Silver medal – second place	2009 Linz	Team
Silver medal – second place	2010 Dubai	Team
Bronze medal – third place	2011 Magdeburg	Team
Bronze medal – third place	2013 Guangzhou	Team
Bronze medal – third place	2015 Dubai	Team
ITTF World Tour Grand Finals
Gold medal – first place	2009 Macau	U21 Singles
Gold medal – first place	2012 Hangzhou	Doubles
Silver medal – second place	2008 Macau	U21 Singles
Bronze medal – third place	2010 Seoul	U21 Singles
Bronze medal – third place	2014 Bangkok	Singles
Bronze medal – third place	2014 Bangkok	Doubles
Asian Games
Silver medal – second place	2010 Guangzhou	Team
Bronze medal – third place	2014 Incheon	Team
Bronze medal – third place	2018 Jakarta–Palembang	Singles
Asian Championships
Silver medal – second place	2007 Yangzhou	Team
Silver medal – second place	2009 Lucknow	Team
Silver medal – second place	2012 Macau	Team
Silver medal – second place	2015 Pattaya	Mixed doubles
Bronze medal – third place	2007 Yangzhou	Doubles
Bronze medal – third place	2009 Lucknow	Doubles
Bronze medal – third place	2013 Busan	Team
Bronze medal – third place	2019 Yogyakarta	Team
Asian Cup
Bronze medal – third place	2014 Wuhan	Singles
Commonwealth Games
Gold medal – first place	2010 New Delhi	Team
Gold medal – first place	2014 Glasgow	Doubles
Gold medal – first place	2014 Glasgow	Team
Gold medal – first place	2018 Gold Coast	Doubles
Gold medal – first place	2018 Gold Coast	Mixed doubles
Silver medal – second place	2010 New Delhi	Singles
Silver medal – second place	2014 Glasgow	Singles
Silver medal – second place	2018 Gold Coast	Singles
Silver medal – second place	2018 Gold Coast	Team
Commonwealth Table Tennis Championships
Gold medal – first place	2009 Glasgow	Doubles
Gold medal – first place	2009 Glasgow	Teams
Gold medal – first place	2013 New Delhi	Doubles
Gold medal – first place	2013 New Delhi	Team
Silver medal – second place	2009 Glasgow	Singles
Silver medal – second place	2013 New Delhi	Singles
Silver medal – second place	2013 New Delhi	Mixed doubles
Southeast Asian Games
Gold medal – first place	2007 Nakhon Ratchasima	Doubles
Gold medal – first place	2007 Nakhon Ratchasima	Team
Gold medal – first place	2009 Vientiane	Doubles
Gold medal – first place	2009 Vientiane	Team
Gold medal – first place	2013 Naypyidaw	Singles
Gold medal – first place	2013 Naypyidaw	Team
Gold medal – first place	2015 Singapore	Mixed doubles
Gold medal – first place	2015 Singapore	Team
Gold medal – first place	2017 Kuala Lumpur	Doubles
Gold medal – first place	2017 Kuala Lumpur	Team
Silver medal – second place	2015 Singapore	Doubles
Silver medal – second place	2017 Kuala Lumpur	Mixed doubles

Yu Mengyu (Chinese: 于梦雨; pinyin: Yú Mèngyǔ; born 18 August 1989) is a retired Chinese-born former Singaporean table tennis player. Born in Liaoning, China, Yu left China in 2006 at the age of 17 to join the Singapore Table Tennis Association (STTA) under the Foreign Sports Talent Scheme. In the same year, Yu made her international debut for Singapore.

Yu was part of the team who defeated China 3-1 to be crowned world champions in the 2010 World Team Table Tennis Championships in Moscow, Russia. She defeated Kasumi Ishikawa and Liu Shiwen consecutively in the women's team event at the 2012 Asian Table Tennis Championships, thereby helping Singapore secure the runner-up position. Yu represented Singapore in the 2016 and 2020 Summer Olympics. She was the flag bearer for Singapore during the 2020 Summer Olympics.

Yu’s career has been consistently plagued by injuries. This made it challenging for her to maintain a high participation rate and stable competitive performance in international competitions. Yu participated in two Olympic Games, being the only female table tennis athlete that secured the fourth place twice and the fifth place twice, but has yet to clinch an Olympic medal.

In 2021, Prime Minister Lee Hsien Loong of Singapore praised Yu at the National Day Rally, commending her spirit of “to be indomitable, to keep going and never give up” during the Tokyo Olympic Games. He referred to her as a representative of the "Singapore Spirit".

On 22 March 2022, Yu retired from the national team. She became STTA’s junior development squad assistant coach, then stepped down in 2023 to pursue a one-year Master of Public Administration programme at Nanyang Technological University, after becoming the first Singapore athlete to receive a full scholarship from the Nanyang Centre for Public Administration. Upon graduation, she joined national sports agency Sport Singapore and is currently responsible for major events and special projects.. In November 2022, she was awarded the Sportswoman of the Year in the Singapore Sports Awards 2022. In 2024, Yu was inducted into the Singapore Sport Hall of Fame.

On 6 August 2026, Yu gave birth to fraternal twins, a boy and a girl.

== Early life ==
Yu was born on 18 August 1989. She started practising table tennis from the age of five and eventually become a provincial player in 1999. She once secured the runner-up position in the Chinese national U17 competition.

During a competition in Beijing when she was 17, Yu was spotted by STTA coach Chen Yong, who invited her to join the Singapore set-up. With the opportunity to compete in international competitions, Yu accepted the invitation and joined the STTA under the Foreign Sports Talent Scheme. She became a Singapore citizen in 2006 and started representing the Singapore team in international competitions. Yu participated in the U21 event of the 2006 ITTF Singapore Open and secured the gold medal in women's singles.

== Education ==
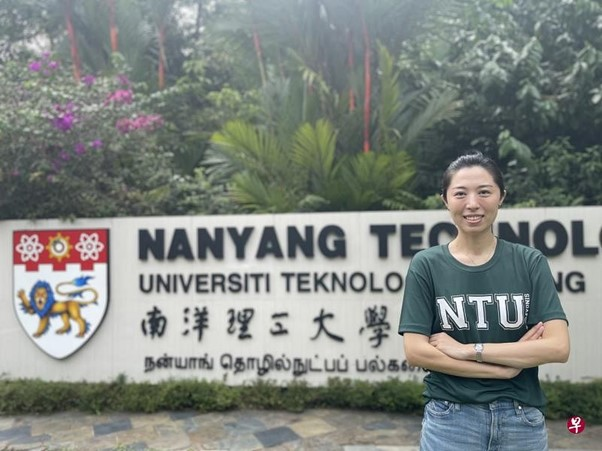
In 2023, Yu began pursuing a one-year Master of Public Administration degree at Nanyang Technological University

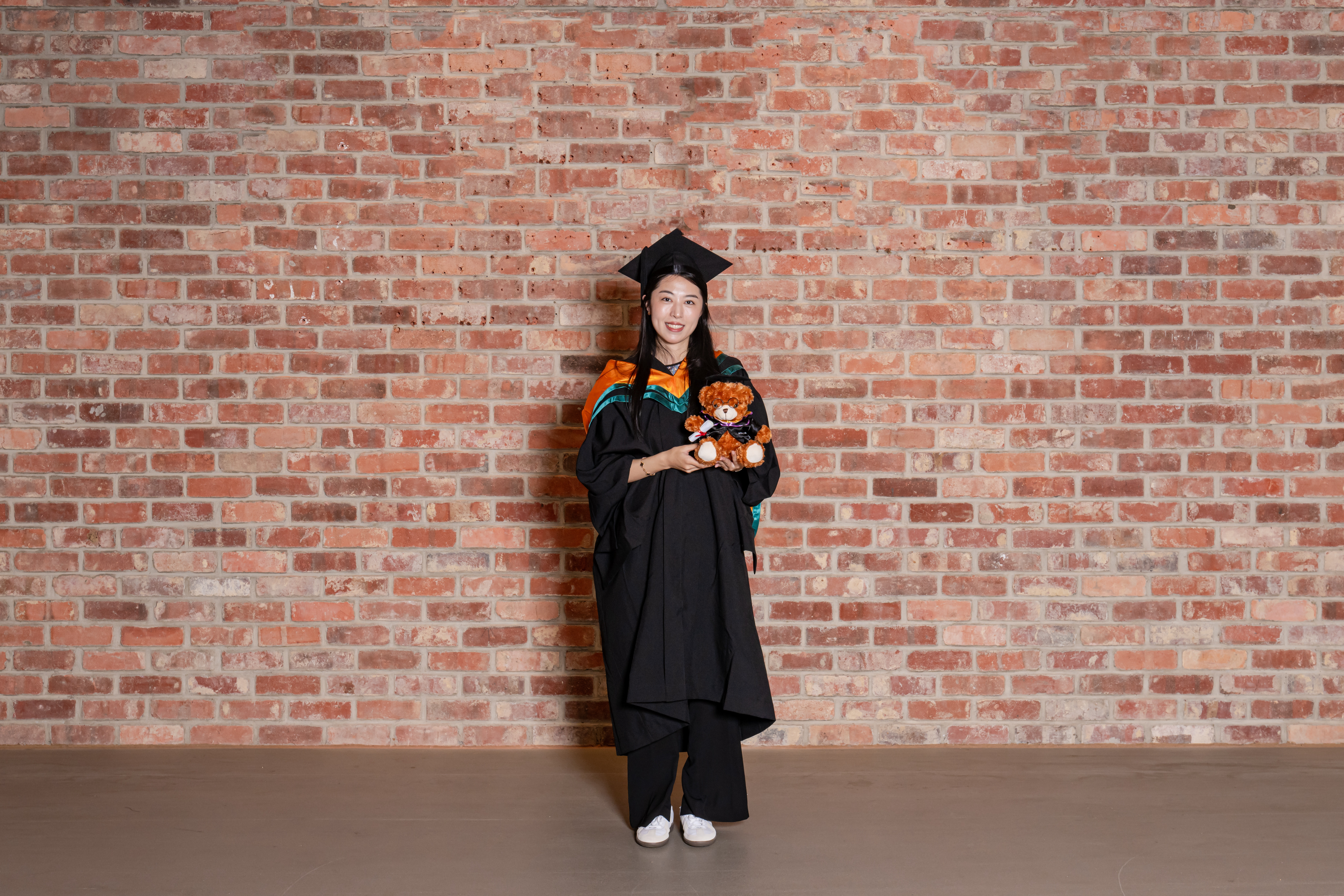
Yu graduated from NTU

In March 2023, Yu left the table tennis scene for the time being to pursue a degree of Executive Master of Public Administration (EMPA) at Nanyang Technological University (NTU, world ranking 12th in the QS ranking in year 2022), after becoming the first Singapore athlete to receive a full scholarship from the Nanyang Centre for Public Administration (NCPA).

In January 2024, Yu graduated from NTU, receiving the degree of EMPA. She was awarded the Association of Southeast Asian Nations (ASEAN) Scholarship by the NCPA. She also received the Best Thesis Award.

== Career ==
=== International career ===
2008–09: ITTF World Tour Grand Finals

In December 2008, during the 2009 ITTF Pro Tour Grand Finals held in Macau, Yu reached the U21 final but ultimately lost to Japanese chopper Yuka Ishigaki, eventually becoming the runner-up.

In January 2010, during the 2009 ITTF Pro Tour Grand Finals held in Macau, Yu secured the U21 championship by defeating Romanian player Dodean 4-0 (11-9, 11-8, 11-5, 11-4) in the final.

==== 2010 World Team Table Tennis Championships ====
Together with Feng, Sun, and Wang, Yu was a member of the team at the Liebherr World Team Table Tennis Championships in Moscow. The team defeated China, 17-time winner and the reigning world champion, with a score of 3–1, which was one of the greatest upsets in table tennis history. This was the first time Singapore had lifted the Corbillon Cup.

In 2010, Yu was ranked as world No. 9. Her ranking contributed to raising the Singapore women's table tennis team up to the second place in the world and to the second seed in the Championship.

==== 2011 Asian Table Tennis Championships ====
In February–March 2011, during the 20th Asian Table Tennis Championships held in Macau, the Singapore women's team, consisting of Yu, Feng, Wang, Li, and Sun, won the semifinal against the Japanese team that composed of Ai Fukuhara, Kasumi Ishikawa, and Sayaka Hirano, with a score of 3-2, thereby securing their place in the final. In the decisive match of the semifinal, Yu defeated Kasumi Ishikawa 3-2, sealing the victory for Singapore and advancing them to the final. However, in the final, Singapore's team lost to the top-seeded Chinese team with an overall score of 1-3, eventually reaching the runner-up position. Notably, in the third game of the final, Yu earnt Singapore's sole point in the match by staging a comeback to win 3-2 (7-11, 6-11, 11-8, 11-5, 11-8) against Chinese player Liu Shiwen.

==== 2012 ITTF World Tour Grand Finals ====
Yu and her partner Feng Tianwei represented Singapore to participate in the 2012 International Table Tennis Federation (ITTF) World Tour Grand Finals. In the competition, the duo of Yu and Feng successively defeated the Japanese pair of Hiroko Fujii and Misako Wakamiya with a score of 4-2 (11-2, 10-12, 12-10, 8-11, 12-10, 11-9) and the Hong Kong Chinese pair of Cheung Hoi Kem and Lee Ho Ching with a score of 4-1 (11-9, 12-10, 11-8, 10-12, 11-8) to advance to the final. In the final, facing the duo of Cheng I-Ching and Huang Yi-Hua from Chinese Taipei, although initially trailing by losing the first two sets, the Singapore pair staged a comeback by consecutively winning three sets and secured victory in the decisive seventh set with a score of 11-2. Ultimately, they reversed the situation with a remarkable 4-3 win (11-13, 11-13, 11-8, 11-4, 11-3, 5-11, 11-2), thereby clinching the gold medal in the women's doubles event at the 2012 ITTF World Tour Grand Finals.

==== 2013–14 World Championships ====
Yu partnered with Feng to compete in the 2013 ITTF World Table Tennis Championships held in Paris, France. The Singaporean duo went through the competition with impressive performances, including defeating the Japanese pair of Kasumi Ishikawa and Mima Ito with a score of 4-1 (11-7, 11-5, 11-7, 8-11, 11-7) and securing a 4-0 victory (11-7, 11-6, 11-3, 11-8) against Japan’s Ai Fukuhara and Sayaka Hirano. In the semi-final, they faced the top-ranked Chinese pair (World No.1) of Guo Yue and Li Xiaoxia, who eventually won the gold medal. Despite winning the first set, the Singaporean duo was defeated with a score of 2-4 (12-10, 7-11, 7-11, 4-11, 11-9, 8-11). Eventually, they secured the bronze medal in the women's doubles event at the 2013 World Table Tennis Championships, which marked a commendable achievement for the Singaporean pair.

Yu, together with her teammates Feng, Li, and Yee, participated in the 2014 World Table Tennis Team Championships held in Tokyo, Japan. As the second-seeded player of the Singaporean team, Yu displayed remarkable performances in the battles against opposing teams’ first-seeded players, achieving a seven-game winning streak. She defeated players such as Ni Xialian from Luxembourg, Li Jiao from the Netherlands, Suh Hyowon from South Korea, and Elizabeta Samara from Romania. This contributed to Singapore's successful journey into the semi-finals. In the semi-final, Yu’s teammate Feng faced a 1-3 defeat against China's Li Xiaoxia. Following that, Yu suffered a 0-3 loss against China's Ding Ning (World No. 1). Li faced a 0-3 defeat against China's Zhu Yuling. The Singaporean team ultimately obtained the bronze medal in the 2014 World Table Tennis Team Championships.

==== 2014 ITTF World Tour Grand Finals and injury ====
Before the 2014 Incheon Asian Games, Yu suffered from a lumbar disc herniation which rendered her unable to walk for over a month. As a result, Yu pulled out of the singles competition at the Asian Games. However, Yu was still entered as part of the table tennis team but failed to make any appearances during the Games.

Yu represented the Singaporean team in the 2014 ITTF World Tour Grand Finals. In the women's singles competition, she defeated German veteran Han Ying with a score of 4-2 and then secured a 4-1 victory against Japanese player Sayaka Hirano. In the semi-final, Yu faced South Korean player Suh Hyowon. Despite winning the first set, she ultimately suffered a 2-4 defeat (11-4, 5-11, 6-11, 8-11, 11-8, 9-11). She concluded the tournament with a bronze medal in the women's singles event.

In the women's doubles competition, Yu partnered with Feng. In the quarterfinals, when facing the Chinese Taipei’s pair of Cheng I-Ching and Huang Yi-Hua, they won with a score of 4-3. In the semi-final, the Singaporean duo faced the eventual gold medallists from Japan, Miu Hirano and Mima Ito. Despite winning the first set, Yu and Feng ended up with a 2-4 defeat (11-5, 8-11, 6-11, 4-11, 11-9, 8-11), obtaining a bronze medal in the women's doubles event at the 2014 ITTF World Tour Grand Finals.

==== 2015 World Championships ====
Yu and her partner Feng participated in the 2015 ITTF World Table Tennis Championships held in Suzhou, China. During the competition, the duo defeated the Hong Kong's pair of Jiang Huajun and Tie Ya Na with a score of 4-1, and the South Korean pair of Park Young-sook and Yang Ha-eun with a score of 4-1. In the semi-final, they faced the world's top-ranked Chinese pair Liu Shiwen and Zhu Yuling who were the eventual gold medallists. Despite winning the first set, Yu and Feng ultimately suffered a 1-4 defeat (11-9, 9-11, 6-11, 7-11, 4-11). The pair secured the bronze medal in the women's doubles event at the 2015 World Table Tennis Championships.

==== 2016 Summer Olympics ====
This was Yu's Olympics debut. She was seeded ninth in singles event and fourth in women's team event. Before the Rio 2016 Olympic Games, Yu had suffered from multiple injuries, battling sports-related health issues for over the years. Starting from April 2016, with the help of painkillers, steroid injections, and platelet-rich plasma therapy, Yu persevered through the 2016 Asian Cup and the Rio Olympics. In November of the same year, she underwent surgery to repair the torn labrum of her shoulder.

In the singles competition, Yu defeated the 8th seed and South Korea's top player Jeon Ji-hee with a score of 4-1, advancing to the quarterfinals but lost with 2–4 (8-11, 11-6, 5-11, 6-11, 11-9, 6-11) to Kim Song-i of North Korea, who is eventually the bronze medalist of Women's single competition.

The Singapore women's team, comprising Yu, Feng and Zhou, reached the semi-final of the team event but lost to China with 0–3. In the bronze medal match, the trio was defeated by Japan 1–3. Yu got things off to a promising start when she upset world No. 8 Ai Fukuhara 3-2 (4-11, 11-5, 11-3, 4-11, 11-5) in the first singles of the best-of-five tie, which was the sole point for the Singapore team. Following that, team captain Feng, however, was defeated 0-3 (10-12, 6-11, 7-11) in her singles tie against Kasumi Ishikawa. Yu teamed up with Zhou in the doubles match, but they were also beaten 1-3 (9-11, 11-9, 11-1, 14-12) by Fukuhara and Mima Ito. Feng in the next single match was unsuccessful against Ito, losing 0-3.

===== Singles event =====
Date	Round	Result	Opponent	Score	Individual Sets					
-	1st	Bye								
-	2nd	Bye								
7 August	3rd	Win	(Australia) Lay Jian Fang	4-0	11-9	11-9	11-6	12-10	-	-
8 August	4th	Win	(South Korea) Jeon Ji-hee	4-1	12-10	8-11	12-10	11-7	11-2	-
9 August	Quarter-Final	Loss	(North Korea) Kim Song-i	2-4	8-11	11-6	5-11	6-11	11-9	6-11

===== Team event =====
Date	Round	Result	Opponent	Score
12 August	Round of 16	Win	Egypt	3-0
13 August	Quarter-Final	Win	South Korea	3-2
15 August	Semi-Final	Loss	China	0-3
16 August	Bronze Medal match	Loss	Japan	1-3

==== 2017 World Championships ====
Starting from 2017, Yu had been consistently troubled by shoulder injuries, which significantly impacted her daily training and life.

Still in the process of recovering from injuries, Yu represented Singapore in the 2017 World Table Tennis Championships held in Dusseldorf, Germany. In the women's doubles event, Yu partnered with Feng. In the quarterfinals, they faced the Chinese Taipei pair of Cheng I-Ching and Chen Szu-Yu. The Singaporean duo secured a 4-2 victory to advance to the semi-finals. In the semi-final, they faced the Chinese pair of Chen Meng and Zhu Yuling. Despite putting up a fight, the Singaporean pair was defeated with a score of 1-4 (6-11, 6-11, 11-6, 8-11, 7-11). They concluded the tournament with a bronze medal in the women's doubles event at the 2017 ITTF World Championships.

==== 2018 Asian Games ====
Yu entered the Asian Games as the 14th seed in the singles event. In the Round of 32, she defeated Alice Chang of Malaysia 4-1 to set up a Round of 16 encounters with 6th seeded Doo Hoi Kem. Yu defeated Doo in a nail-biting contest that was stretched to the maximum seven games, winning 4-3. In the quarterfinals, Yu pulled off a shock win against the 3rd seed Cheng I-ching by winning 4-1, and changed the head-to-head record against Cheng 10:3. In the semifinals, Yu played against the 2nd seeded Wang Manyu of China, losing 1-4 (7-11, 6–11, 5–11, 11–9, 7–11). As a result of reaching the semifinals, Yu clinched the bronze medal in the singles event.

==== 2019 Asian Table Tennis Championships ====
In September 2019, at the 2019 Asian Table Tennis Championships held in Yogyakarta, Indonesia, the Singapore team, consisting of Yu, Feng, Lin, Wang, and Wei, achieved victories by defeating the Malaysian team 3-1 and the South Korean team, composed of Jeon Ji-hee, Suh Hyowon, and Yang Ha-eun, 3-1 as well. These wins secured their spot in the semi-finals. In the semi-final match, Singapore's team faced a 0-3 defeat against the top-seeded Chinese team led by Ding Ning, Chen Meng, and Wang Manyu. The Singapore team ultimately secured the bronze medal.

==== 2020 Summer Olympics ====
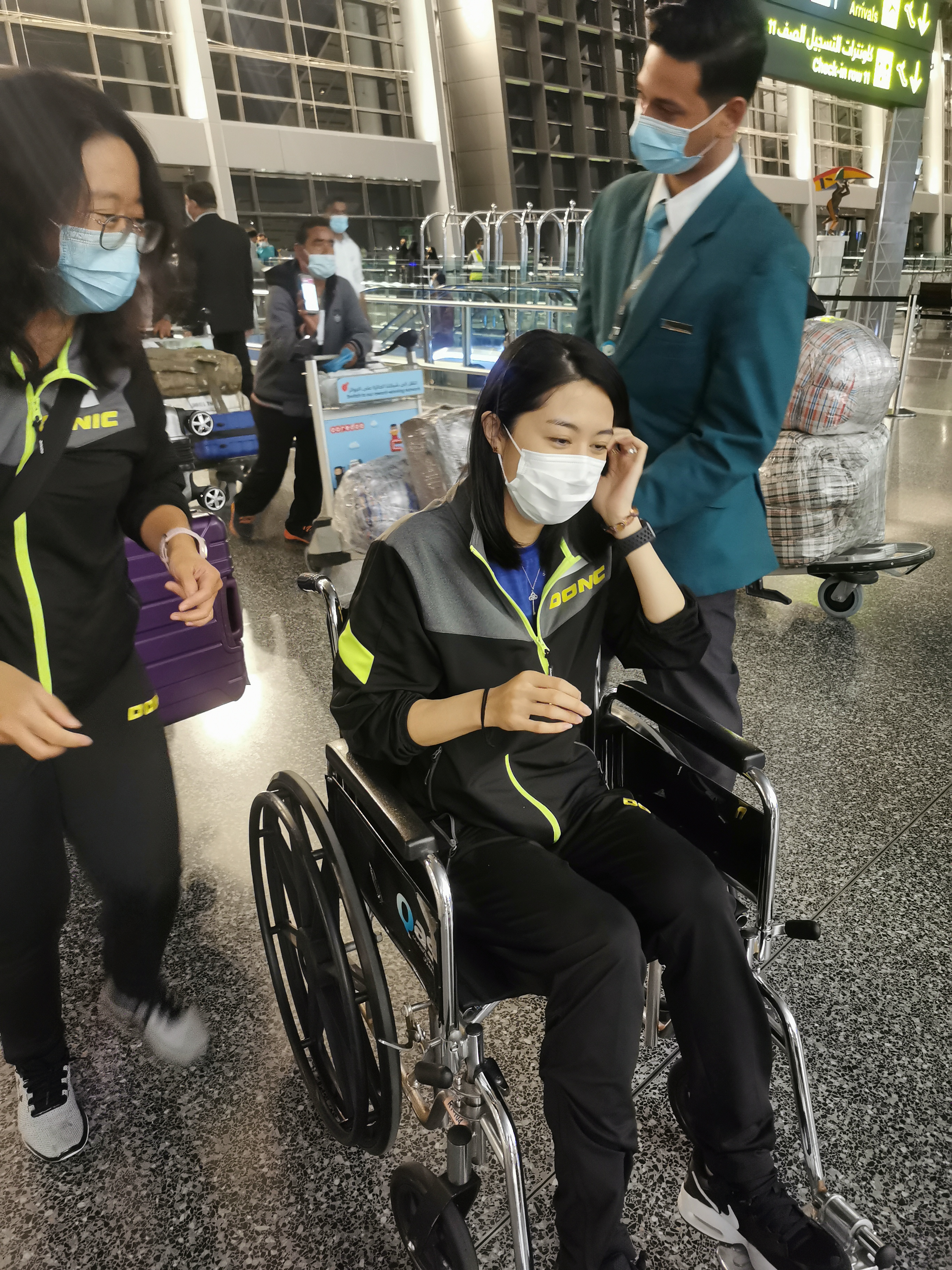
In March 2021, Yu was injured and had to take wheelchair to return Singapore

In March 2021, during the WTT Star Contender event in Doha, Qatar, Yu's back injury flared up and had to return to Singapore in a wheelchair, putting her fitness in doubt for the 2020 Summer Olympics.

Yu was the flag bearer for Singapore during the Parade of Nations in the opening ceremony of the 2020 Summer Olympics.

In the singles competition of the Tokyo Olympics, Yu defeated fourth seed Cheng I-ching of Chinese Taipei with a score of 4-0. Subsequently, in the quarter-finals, despite losing the first game, Yu staged a comeback and won against Japanese player and fifth seed Kasumi Ishikawa with a score of 4-1, adjusting their head-to-head record to 8:8. Yu faced first seed Chen Meng of China in the semi-final match. During the 4th set against Chen, she suffered a left leg injury that required on-site treatment. Yu eventually lost the match 0–4 (6-11, 8-11, 7-11, 6-11). Yu later faced Mima Ito in the Bronze Medal match on the same day, initially winning the 1st set but eventually lost the match 1–4 (11-6, 8-11, 7-11, 7-11, 6-11). Overall, she placed 4th in the Women's singles.

Yu also participated in the Women's Team event with Feng and Lin. In the Round of 16, Singapore defeated France 3–0. In the first match (doubles), Yu paired up with Lin to win 3-0 against the French pair of Loeuillette Stephanie and Jia Nan Yuan. Feng won the second match with a 3–2 victory over Prithika Pavade. In the third match, Yu defeated Yuan 3-1, wrapping up an overall 3–0 victory for Singapore. In the quarterfinals, Singapore faced China, the top seed and eventual gold medallists in the Team event. In the first match, Yu and Lin lost 0-3 (5-11, 7–11, 5–11) to China's Chen Meng and Wang Manyu. Feng then lost the second match to Sun Yingsha, and Wang wrapped up the victory for China following a 3–1 (6-11,11-9,11-6,11-5) win over Olympics debutant Lin in the third match.

Yu announced it would be her last participation at the Olympics. After the Tokyo Olympics, she underwent a neck surgery.

===== Singles event =====
Date	Round	Result	Opponent	Score	Individual Sets					
-	1st	Bye								
25 July	2nd	Win	(Portugal) Shao Jieni	4-0	11-3	11-2	11-8	11-9	-	-
27 July	3rd	Win	(Chinese Taipei) Cheng I-ching	4-0	11-5	11-9	12-10	11-6	-	-
27 July	4th	Win	(United States) Juan Liu	4-2	11-9	11-9	11-9	8-11	6-11	11-8
28 July	Quarter-Final	Win	(Japan) Kasumi Ishikawa	4-1	8-11	11-5	14-12	11-6	11-2	-
29 July	Semi-Final	Loss	(China) Chen Meng	0-4	6-11	8-11	7-11	6-11	-	-
29 July	Bronze Medal Match	Loss	(Japan) Mima Ito	1-4	11-6	8-11	7-11	7-11	6-11	-

===== Team event =====
Date	Round	Result	Opponent	Score
2 August	Round of 16	Win	France	3-0
3 August	Quarter-Final	Loss	China	0-3

=== Club career ===
From 2019 to 2021, Yu was a player in Nissay Red Elf table tennis club in T.League, Japan, who won the T-League championship for three consecutive years from 2019 to 2021.

=== Retirement ===
Yu announced her retirement from the national team on 22 March 2022 at the Singapore Table Tennis Association's Annual Awards Night. She said she will, after retirement, keep adhering to the tenacious and indomitable sportsmanship which is crucial to success. She hopes to convey more positive energy to others and to society at large.

After her retirement, Yu was appointed as an assistant coach for the Singapore Table Tennis Association's junior development squad for high-profile players aged 9 to 12. Yu was happy with the appointment and hoped to share her experiences with the young athletes and groom them into champions of Singapore.

Currently, Yu continues to contribute to the development of Singapore's sporting community as part of national sports agency Sport Singapore and is currently responsible for major events and special projects..

== Reception and legacy ==
At the 2021 National Day Rally, Prime Minister Lee Hsien Loong said that Yu was the embodiment of the Singapore spirit after her Tokyo 2020 heroics in which she beat two top-10 opponents. Prime Minister Lee Hsien Loong said: “Mengyu was fearless against stronger opponents and fought hard for every point. She made it to the semi-finals, and hoped very much to win a medal for Singapore. Many Singaporeans who saw her in action were moved by her determination. I watched some of her matches and sensed her perseverance and fighting spirit. In her own words, she had no regrets about losing as she had done her best. While she did not win a medal in the end, she won the applause and respect of Singaporeans. And that is the Singapore spirit, to be indomitable, to keep going and never give up.”

Singapore Minister for Culture, Community and Youth Edwin Tong also paid tribute to Yu in a Facebook of his own. He shared that Yu was carrying a back injury, but still pressed on and managed to defeat top-ranked opponents. Singapore National Olympic Council president Tan Chuan-Jin hailed Yu's outing at the Tokyo Games as a "glorious one" and praised her tenacity.

In February 2024, Yu was inducted into the Singapore Sport Hall of Fame, together with two other athletes and five sports leaders.

== Career records ==
Singles

- Olympics: QF (2016); fourth place (2020).
- World Championships: round of 64 (2013, 2017); round of 32 (2011); round of 16 (2009, 2015).
- World Cup: QF (2012, 2013).
- ITTF World Tour Grand Finals: QF (2009); third place (2014).
- Asian Championships: round of 16 (2007, 2009); QF (2013).
- Asian Cup: third place(2014), QF (2016).
- Asian Games: third place(2018).
- Commonwealth Games: runner-up (2010, 2014, 2018).
- Commonwealth Table Tennis Championships: runner-up (2009, 2013).
- Southeast Asian Games: winner (2013).
- Pro Tour / ITTF World Tour
  - Winner (1): 2009 Pro Tour Indian Open
  - Runner-up (2): 2010 Pro Tour Indian Open, 2016 ITTF World Tour Polish Open (Major)
  - Third Place (5): 2011 Pro Tour Brazil Open, GAC Group 2014 ITTF World Tour, Korean Open (Super), GAC Group 2014 ITTF World Tour, Japan Open (Super), GAC GROUP 2014 ITTF World Tour Grand Finals, 2021 WTT Middle East Hub - WTT Contender
- Pro Tour / ITTF World Tour U21
  - Winner (10): 2006 Singapore Open, 2007 Qatar Open, 2007 LIEBHERR Chile Open, 2007 Volkswagen Korean Open, 2007 Volkswagen Open – China, 2009 Pro Tour Harmony China Open, 2009 Pro Tour Japan Open, 2009 ITTF Pro Tour Grand Finals, 2010 Pro Tour Kuwait Open, 2010 Pro Tour Indian Open
  - Runner-up (5): 2007 Indian Open, 2008 Pro Tour ERKE Qatar Open, 2008 Pro Tour Brazil Open, 2008 ITTF Volkswagen Pro Tour Grand Finals, 2010 Pro Tour Qatar Open
  - Third Place (13): 2006 Russian Open, 2007 LIEBHERR Brazil Open, 2007 Volkswagen Japan Open, 2007 Eurosib Russian Open, 2007 LIEBHERR France Open, 2008 Pro Tour Volkswagen Open Korean, 2008 TMS Open – Singapore, 2009 Pro Tour Germany Open, 2009 Pro Tour China Open, 2009 Pro Tour KAL Cup Korean Open, 2010 Pro Tour German Open, 2010 Pro Tour Korean Open, 2010 ITTF KAL Cup 2010 Pro Tour Grand Final

Women's doubles

- World Championships: round of 16 (2009); third place (2013, 2015, 2017).
- World Tour Grand Finals: winner(2012); third place (2009, 2014).
- Asian Championships: third place(2007, 2009).
- Commonwealth Games: winner(2014, 2018).
- Commonwealth Table Tennis Championships: winner(2009, 2013).
- Southeast Asian Games: winner(2007, 2009, 2017); runner-up(2015).
- Pro Tour / ITTF World Tour
  - Third Place (15): 2007 Slovenian Open, 2007 LIEBHERR Brazil Open, 2009 Pro Tour Indian Open, 2009 Pro Tour Germany Open, 2009 ITTF Pro Tour Grand Finals, 2011 Pro Tour Slovenia Open, 2012 World Tour Japan Open, 2013 GAC Group 2013 ITTF World Tour Korean Air Korea Open, Major Series, 2014 GAC Group 2014 ITTF World Tour China Open (Super), 2014 GAC Group 2014 ITTF World Tour, Korean Open (Super), 2014 GAC Group 2014 ITTF World Tour, Swedish Open (Major), 2014 GAC GROUP 2014 ITTF World Tour Grand Finals, 2015 GAC Group 2015 ITTF World Tour, China Open (Super), 2016 World Tour LAOX Japan Open (Super), 2016 2020 ITTF World Tour Platinum Qatar Open Doha

Mixed doubles

- World Championships: round of 64 (2009); round of 32 (2015); round of 16 (2011, 2013).
- Asian Championships: runner-up(2015).
- Commonwealth Games: winner(2018).
- Commonwealth Table Tennis Championships: runner-up(2013).
- Southeast Asian Games: winner(2015), runner-up(2017).

Team

- Olympics: fourth place(2016); QF (2020);.
- World Championships: winner(2010); runner-up(2008, 2012); third place (2014); QF (2016).
- World Team Cup: runner-up(2009, 2010); third place (2011, 2013, 2015).
- Asian Championships: runner-up(2007, 2009, 2012), third place (2013, 2019).
- Asian Games: runner-up(2010); third place (2014); QF (2018).
- Commonwealth Games: winner(2010, 2014); runner-up(2018).
- Commonwealth Table Tennis Championships: winner(2009, 2013).
- Southeast Asian Games: winner(2007, 2009, 2013, 2015, 2017).

== Honours and awards ==
- Singapore Sport Hall of Fame, Roll of Honour, 2024
- Sportswoman of the Year, Singapore Sports Awards 2022
- Meritorious Award (Individual) (2022, 2019, 2017, 2015, 2014, 2013, 2011, 2010)
- Meritorious Award (Team) (2022, 2020, 2019, 2018, 2017, 2016, 2015, 2014, 2013, 2012, 2010, 2008) (National women's table tennis team)
- Strait Times Athlete of the Year 2010 (National women's table tennis team)
- Nominated for The Straits Times' Athlete of the Year (2021, 2018)

== See also ==
- List of Singapore world champions in sports

Olympic Games
Preceded by Derek Wong	Flagbearer for Singapore; With Loh Kean Yew; Tokyo 2020	Succeeded by Incumbent
