= Suthasini Sawettabut =

Thai table tennis player

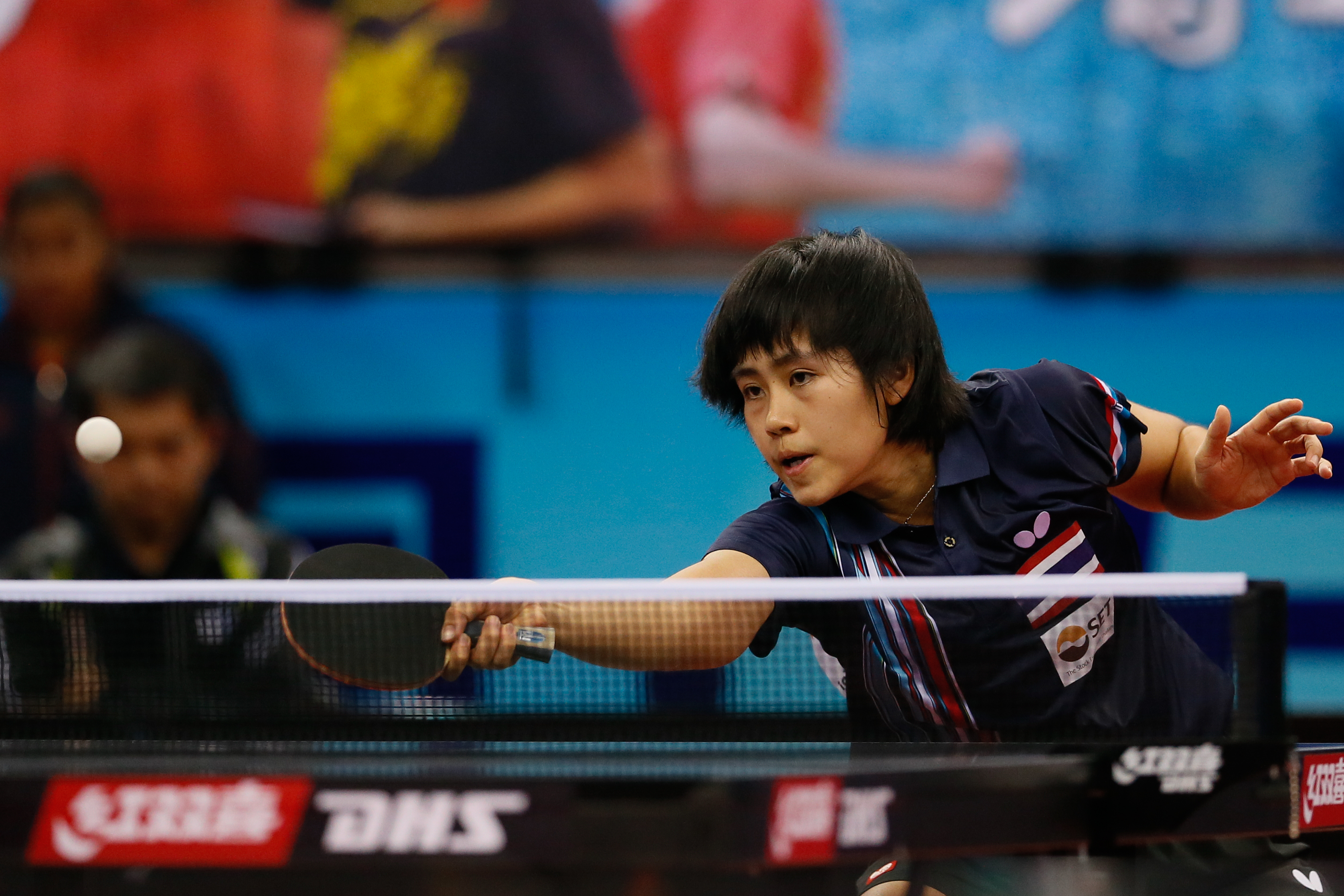
- Sawettabut at the 2017 Asian Championships

Personal information
- Full name: Suthasini Sawettabut
- Born: 9 December 1994 (age 31) Ranong, Thailand
- Height: 1.68 m (5 ft 6 in)
- Weight: 63 kg (139 lb)

Sport
- Sport: Table tennis
- Club: Nippon Paint Mallets
- Playing style: Right-handed, Shakehand grip
- Highest ranking: 21 (3 May 2022)
- Current ranking: 39 (26 September 2023)
Medal record
Women's Table Tennis
Representing Thailand
Event	1st	2nd	3rd
Asian Games	0	0	2
SEA Games	10	4	5
Total	10	4	7
Asian Games
Bronze medal – third place	2022 Hangzhou	Team
Bronze medal – third place	2026 Aichi-Nagoya	Doubles
SEA Games
Gold medal – first place	2015 Singapore	Singles
Gold medal – first place	2017 Kuala Lumpur	Mixed doubles
Gold medal – first place	2019 Philippines	Doubles
Gold medal – first place	2021 Vietnam	Doubles
Gold medal – first place	2021 Vietnam	Team
Gold medal – first place	2023 Cambodia	Doubles
Gold medal – first place	2023 Cambodia	Team
Gold medal – first place	2025 Bangkok	Singles
Gold medal – first place	2025 Bangkok	Doubles
Gold medal – first place	2025 Bangkok	Team
Silver medal – second place	2009 Vientiane	Team
Silver medal – second place	2015 Singapore	Mixed doubles
Silver medal – second place	2015 Singapore	Team
Silver medal – second place	2021 Vietnam	Singles
Bronze medal – third place	2015 Singapore	Doubles
Bronze medal – third place	2017 Kuala Lumpur	Team
Bronze medal – third place	2017 Kuala Lumpur	Singles
Bronze medal – third place	2019 Philippines	Singles
Bronze medal – third place	2021 Vietnam	Mixed doubles

Suthasini Sawettabut (Thai: สุธาสินี เสวตรบุตร, born 9 December 1994) is a Thai table tennis player.

Suthasini started playing table tennis at the age of 6. Suthasini got fourth place for the Women's singles in the 2010 Youth Olympics.

She has qualified to represent Thailand at the 2020 Summer Olympics. She has made new history for Thailand as she reached round of 16 in 2020 Summer Olympics, the first ever Thai player who can reached this round after defeated by Mima Ito 0-4 games.

== Personal life ==
Suthasini's sister, Jinnipa Sawttabut, is also a table tennis player.

== Achievements ==
=== ITTF Tours ===
Women's singles

Year	Tournament	Level	Final opponent	Score	Rank
2019	Indonesia Open	Challenge	Shao Jieni	3–4	2nd place, silver medalist(s)

Women's doubles

Year	Tournament	Level	Partner	Final opponents	Score	Rank
2018	Thailand Open	Challenge	Orawan Paranang	Satsuki Odo; Saki Shibata	3–2	1st place, gold medalist(s)
2019	Indonesia Open	Challenge	Orawan Paranang	Shao Jieni; Luo Xue	2–3	2nd place, silver medalist(s)
2020	Portugal Open	Challenge	Orawan Paranang	Satsuki Odo; Saki Shibata	0–3	2nd place, silver medalist(s)
